= List of Supernatural episodes =

Supernatural is an American supernatural drama television series, created by Eric Kripke, that follows brothers Sam (Jared Padalecki) and Dean Winchester (Jensen Ackles) as they travel throughout the United States hunting supernatural creatures. The series borrows heavily from folklore and urban legends, and explores mythology and Christian theology, and their main adversaries throughout the series are demons.

The series premiered on September 13, 2005, on The WB. The first season was broadcast on The WB, and following The WB's merger with UPN in September 2006, Supernatural continued to be aired on the new network, The CW. All fifteen seasons are available on DVD in Regions 1, 2, and 4 and are also available on Blu-ray.

During the course of the series, 327 episodes of Supernatural aired over fifteen seasons, between September 13, 2005, and November 19, 2020.

== Series overview ==
Season	Episodes		Originally released			Rank	Average viewership (in millions)
Season	Episodes		First released	Last released	Network	Rank	Average viewership (in millions)
1	22		September 13, 2005	May 4, 2006	The WB	165	3.81 (Note: Statistics run from September 19, 2005, through May 7, 2006, leaving out the season premiere.)
2	22		September 28, 2006	May 17, 2007	The CW	216	3.14
3	16		October 4, 2007	May 15, 2008	The CW	187	2.74
4	22		September 18, 2008	May 14, 2009	The CW	161	3.14 (Note: Statistics run from September 22, 2008, through May 17, 2009, leaving out the season premiere.)
5	22		September 10, 2009	May 13, 2010	The CW	125	2.64
6	22		September 24, 2010	May 20, 2011	The CW	209	2.42
7	23		September 23, 2011	May 18, 2012	The CW	176	2.03
8	23		October 3, 2012	May 15, 2013	The CW	152	2.52
9	23		October 8, 2013	May 20, 2014	The CW	141	2.81
10	23		October 7, 2014	May 20, 2015	The CW	156	2.02
11	23		October 7, 2015	May 25, 2016	The CW	131	2.81
12	23		October 13, 2016	May 18, 2017	The CW	132	2.62
13	23		October 12, 2017	May 17, 2018	The CW	166	2.32
14	20		October 11, 2018	April 25, 2019	The CW	159	2.07
15	20	13	October 10, 2019	March 23, 2020	The CW	116	1.86
15	20	7	October 8, 2020	November 19, 2020	The CW	131	1.63

== Episodes ==
=== Season 1 (2005–06) ===
No. overall	No. in season	Title	Directed by	Written by	Original release date	Prod. code	U.S. viewers (millions)
1	1	"Pilot"	David Nutter	Eric Kripke	September 13, 2005	475285	5.69
2	2	"Wendigo"	David Nutter	Story by : Ron Milbauer & Terri Hughes Burton; Teleplay by : Eric Kripke	September 20, 2005	2T6901	5.01
3	3	"Dead in the Water"	Kim Manners	Sera Gamble & Raelle Tucker	September 27, 2005	2T6903	5.01
4	4	"Phantom Traveler"	Robert Singer	Richard Hatem	October 4, 2005	2T6904	5.40
5	5	"Bloody Mary"	Peter Ellis	Story by : Eric Kripke; Teleplay by : Ron Milbauer & Terri Hughes Burton	October 11, 2005	2T6905	5.50
6	6	"Skin"	Robert Duncan McNeill	John Shiban	October 18, 2005	2T6906	5.00
7	7	"Hook Man"	David Jackson	John Shiban	October 25, 2005	2T6902	5.08
8	8	"Bugs"	Kim Manners	Rachel Nave & Bill Coakley	November 8, 2005	2T6907	4.47
9	9	"Home"	Ken Girotti	Eric Kripke	November 15, 2005	2T6908	4.21
10	10	"Asylum"	Guy Bee	Richard Hatem	November 22, 2005	2T6909	5.38
11	11	"Scarecrow"	Kim Manners	Story by : Patrick Sean Smith; Teleplay by : John Shiban	January 10, 2006	2T6911	4.23
12	12	"Faith"	Allan Kroeker	Sera Gamble & Raelle Tucker	January 17, 2006	2T6910	3.86
13	13	"Route 666"	Paul Shapiro	Eugenie Ross-Leming & Brad Buckner	January 31, 2006	2T6912	5.82
14	14	"Nightmare"	Phil Sgriccia	Sera Gamble & Raelle Tucker	February 7, 2006	2T6913	4.27
15	15	"The Benders"	Peter Ellis	John Shiban	February 14, 2006	2T6914	3.96
16	16	"Shadow"	Kim Manners	Eric Kripke	February 28, 2006	2T6915	4.22
17	17	"Hell House"	Chris Long	Trey Callaway	March 30, 2006	2T6916	3.76
18	18	"Something Wicked"	Whitney Ransick	Daniel Knauf	April 6, 2006	2T6917	3.67
19	19	"Provenance"	Phil Sgriccia	David Ehrman	April 13, 2006	2T6918	3.62
20	20	"Dead Man's Blood"	Tony Wharmby	Cathryn Humphris & John Shiban	April 20, 2006	2T6919	3.99
21	21	"Salvation"	Robert Singer	Sera Gamble & Raelle Tucker	April 27, 2006	2T6920	3.26
22	22	"Devil's Trap"	Kim Manners	Eric Kripke	May 4, 2006	2T6921	3.99

=== Season 2 (2006–07) ===
No. overall	No. in season	Title	Directed by	Written by	Original release date	Prod. code	U.S. viewers (millions)
23	1	"In My Time of Dying"	Kim Manners	Eric Kripke	September 28, 2006	3T5501	3.93
24	2	"Everybody Loves a Clown"	Phil Sgriccia	John Shiban	October 5, 2006	3T5502	3.34
25	3	"Bloodlust"	Robert Singer	Sera Gamble	October 12, 2006	3T5503	3.78
26	4	"Children Shouldn't Play with Dead Things"	Kim Manners	Raelle Tucker	October 19, 2006	3T5504	3.29
27	5	"Simon Said"	Tim Iacofano	Ben Edlund	October 26, 2006	3T5505	3.65
28	6	"No Exit"	Kim Manners	Matt Witten	November 2, 2006	3T5506	3.38
29	7	"The Usual Suspects"	Mike Rohl	Cathryn Humphris	November 9, 2006	3T5507	3.19
30	8	"Crossroad Blues"	Steve Boyum	Sera Gamble	November 16, 2006	3T5508	3.16
31	9	"Croatoan"	Robert Singer	John Shiban	December 7, 2006	3T5509	3.12
32	10	"Hunted"	Rachel Talalay	Raelle Tucker	January 11, 2007	3T5510	3.24
33	11	"Playthings"	Charles Beeson	Matt Witten	January 18, 2007	3T5511	3.44
34	12	"Nightshifter"	Phil Sgriccia	Ben Edlund	January 25, 2007	3T5512	3.42
35	13	"Houses of the Holy"	Kim Manners	Sera Gamble	February 1, 2007	3T5513	3.37
36	14	"Born Under a Bad Sign"	J. Miller Tobin	Cathryn Humphris	February 8, 2007	3T5514	2.84
37	15	"Tall Tales"	Bradford May	John Shiban	February 15, 2007	3T5515	3.03
38	16	"Roadkill"	Charles Beeson	Raelle Tucker	March 15, 2007	3T5516	3.52
39	17	"Heart"	Kim Manners	Sera Gamble	March 22, 2007	3T5517	3.38
40	18	"Hollywood Babylon"	Phil Sgriccia	Ben Edlund	April 19, 2007	3T5518	3.25
41	19	"Folsom Prison Blues"	Mike Rohl	John Shiban	April 26, 2007	3T5519	3.33
42	20	"What Is and What Should Never Be"	Eric Kripke	Raelle Tucker	May 3, 2007	3T5520	3.11
43	21	"All Hell Breaks Loose (Part 1)"	Robert Singer	Sera Gamble	May 10, 2007	3T5521	2.90
44	22	"All Hell Breaks Loose (Part 2)"	Kim Manners	Story by : Eric Kripke & Michael T. Moore; Teleplay by : Eric Kripke	May 17, 2007	3T5522	2.72

=== Season 3 (2007–08) ===
No. overall	No. in season	Title	Directed by	Written by	Original release date	Prod. code	U.S. viewers (millions)
45	1	"The Magnificent Seven"	Kim Manners	Eric Kripke	October 4, 2007	3T6901	2.97
46	2	"The Kids Are Alright"	Phil Sgriccia	Sera Gamble	October 11, 2007	3T6902	3.16
47	3	"Bad Day at Black Rock"	Robert Singer	Ben Edlund	October 18, 2007	3T6903	3.03
48	4	"Sin City"	Charles Beeson	Robert Singer & Jeremy Carver	October 25, 2007	3T6904	3.18
49	5	"Bedtime Stories"	Mike Rohl	Cathryn Humphris	November 1, 2007	3T6905	3.24
50	6	"Red Sky at Morning"	Cliff Bole	Laurence Andries	November 8, 2007	3T6906	3.01
51	7	"Fresh Blood"	Kim Manners	Sera Gamble	November 15, 2007	3T6907	2.88
52	8	"A Very Supernatural Christmas"	J. Miller Tobin	Jeremy Carver	December 13, 2007	3T6908	3.02
53	9	"Malleus Maleficarum"	Robert Singer	Ben Edlund	January 31, 2008	3T6909	2.95
54	10	"Dream a Little Dream of Me"	Steve Boyum	Story by : Sera Gamble & Cathryn Humphris; Teleplay by : Cathryn Humphris	February 7, 2008	3T6910	2.68
55	11	"Mystery Spot"	Kim Manners	Story by : Jeremy Carver & Emily McLaughlin; Teleplay by : Jeremy Carver	February 14, 2008	3T6912	2.97
56	12	"Jus in Bello"	Phil Sgriccia	Sera Gamble	February 21, 2008	3T6911	3.23
57	13	"Ghostfacers!"	Phil Sgriccia	Ben Edlund	April 24, 2008	3T6913	2.22
58	14	"Long-Distance Call"	Robert Singer	Jeremy Carver	May 1, 2008	3T6914	2.63
59	15	"Time Is On My Side"	Charles Beeson	Sera Gamble	May 8, 2008	3T6915	2.55
60	16	"No Rest for the Wicked"	Kim Manners	Eric Kripke	May 15, 2008	3T6916	3.00

=== Season 4 (2008–09) ===
No. overall	No. in season	Title	Directed by	Written by	Original release date	Prod. code	U.S. viewers (millions)
61	1	"Lazarus Rising"	Kim Manners	Eric Kripke	September 18, 2008	3T7501	3.96
62	2	"Are You There, God? It's Me, Dean Winchester"	Phil Sgriccia	Story by : Sera Gamble & Lou Bollo; Teleplay by : Sera Gamble	September 25, 2008	3T7502	3.18
63	3	"In the Beginning"	Steve Boyum	Jeremy Carver	October 2, 2008	3T7504	3.51
64	4	"Metamorphosis"	Kim Manners	Cathryn Humphris	October 9, 2008	3T7505	3.15
65	5	"Monster Movie"	Robert Singer	Ben Edlund	October 16, 2008	3T7503	3.06
66	6	"Yellow Fever"	Phil Sgriccia	Andrew Dabb & Daniel Loflin	October 23, 2008	3T7506	3.25
67	7	"It's the Great Pumpkin, Sam Winchester"	Charles Beeson	Julie Siege	October 30, 2008	3T7507	3.55
68	8	"Wishful Thinking"	Robert Singer	Story by : Ben Edlund & Lou Bollo; Teleplay by : Ben Edlund	November 6, 2008	3T7508	3.24
69	9	"I Know What You Did Last Summer"	Charles Beeson	Sera Gamble	November 13, 2008	3T7509	2.94
70	10	"Heaven and Hell"	J. Miller Tobin	Story by : Trevor Sands; Teleplay by : Eric Kripke	November 20, 2008	3T7510	3.34
71	11	"Family Remains"	Phil Sgriccia	Jeremy Carver	January 15, 2009	3T7511	2.98
72	12	"Criss Angel Is a Douche Bag"	Robert Singer	Julie Siege	January 22, 2009	3T7512	3.06
73	13	"After School Special"	Adam Kane	Andrew Dabb & Daniel Loflin	January 29, 2009	3T7513	3.56
74	14	"Sex and Violence"	Charles Beeson	Cathryn Humphris	February 5, 2009	3T7514	3.37
75	15	"Death Takes a Holiday"	Steve Boyum	Jeremy Carver	March 12, 2009	3T7515	2.84
76	16	"On the Head of a Pin"	Mike Rohl	Ben Edlund	March 19, 2009	3T7516	3.37
77	17	"It's a Terrible Life"	James L. Conway	Sera Gamble	March 26, 2009	3T7517	3.13
78	18	"The Monster at the End of This Book"	Mike Rohl	Story by : Julie Siege & Nancy Weiner; Teleplay by : Julie Siege	April 2, 2009	3T7518	3.27
79	19	"Jump the Shark"	Phil Sgriccia	Andrew Dabb & Daniel Loflin	April 23, 2009	3T7519	2.70
80	20	"The Rapture"	Charles Beeson	Jeremy Carver	April 30, 2009	3T7520	2.95
81	21	"When the Levee Breaks"	Robert Singer	Sera Gamble	May 7, 2009	3T7521	2.79
82	22	"Lucifer Rising"	Eric Kripke	Eric Kripke	May 14, 2009	3T7522	2.89

=== Season 5 (2009–10) ===
No. overall	No. in season	Title	Directed by	Written by	Original release date	Prod. code	U.S. viewers (millions)
83	1	"Sympathy for the Devil"	Robert Singer	Eric Kripke	September 10, 2009	3X5201	3.40
84	2	"Good God, Y'All!"	Phil Sgriccia	Sera Gamble	September 17, 2009	3X5202	2.78
85	3	"Free to Be You and Me"	J. Miller Tobin	Jeremy Carver	September 24, 2009	3X5203	2.66
86	4	"The End"	Steve Boyum	Ben Edlund	October 1, 2009	3X5204	2.60
87	5	"Fallen Idols"	James L. Conway	Julie Siege	October 8, 2009	3X5205	2.47
88	6	"I Believe the Children Are Our Future"	Charles Beeson	Andrew Dabb & Daniel Loflin	October 15, 2009	3X5206	2.58
89	7	"The Curious Case of Dean Winchester"	Robert Singer	Story by : Sera Gamble & Jenny Klein; Teleplay by : Sera Gamble	October 29, 2009	3X5207	2.92
90	8	"Changing Channels"	Charles Beeson	Jeremy Carver	November 5, 2009	3X5208	2.65
91	9	"The Real Ghostbusters"	James L. Conway	Story by : Nancy Weiner; Teleplay by : Eric Kripke	November 12, 2009	3X5209	2.69
92	10	"Abandon All Hope..."	Phil Sgriccia	Ben Edlund	November 19, 2009	3X5210	2.51
93	11	"Sam, Interrupted"	James L. Conway	Andrew Dabb & Daniel Loflin	January 21, 2010	3X5211	2.85
94	12	"Swap Meat"	Robert Singer	Story by : Julie Siege & Rebecca Dessertine & Harvey Fedor; Teleplay by : Julie Siege	January 28, 2010	3X5212	2.71
95	13	"The Song Remains the Same"	Steve Boyum	Sera Gamble & Nancy Weiner	February 4, 2010	3X5213	2.28
96	14	"My Bloody Valentine" (Note: Jensen Ackles starred in the 2009 film My Bloody Valentine 3D.)	Mike Rohl	Ben Edlund	February 11, 2010	3X5215	2.51
97	15	"Dead Men Don't Wear Plaid"	John F. Showalter	Jeremy Carver	March 25, 2010	3X5214	2.95
98	16	"Dark Side of the Moon"	Jeff Woolnough	Andrew Dabb & Daniel Loflin	April 1, 2010	3X5216	2.40
99	17	"99 Problems"	Charles Beeson	Julie Siege	April 8, 2010	3X5217	2.78
100	18	"Point of No Return"	Phil Sgriccia	Jeremy Carver	April 15, 2010	3X5218	2.45
101	19	"Hammer of the Gods"	Rick Bota	Story by : David Reed; Teleplay by : Andrew Dabb & Daniel Loflin	April 22, 2010	3X5219	2.82
102	20	"The Devil You Know"	Robert Singer	Ben Edlund	April 29, 2010	3X5220	2.38
103	21	"Two Minutes to Midnight"	Phil Sgriccia	Sera Gamble	May 6, 2010	3X5221	2.53
104	22	"Swan Song"	Steve Boyum	Story by : Eric Gewirtz; Teleplay by : Eric Kripke	May 13, 2010	3X5222	2.84

=== Season 6 (2010–11) ===
No. overall	No. in season	Title	Directed by	Written by	Original release date	Prod. code	U.S. viewers (millions)
105	1	"Exile on Main St."	Phil Sgriccia	Sera Gamble	September 24, 2010	3X6052	2.90
106	2	"Two and a Half Men"	John F. Showalter	Adam Glass	October 1, 2010	3X6053	2.33
107	3	"The Third Man"	Robert Singer	Ben Edlund	October 8, 2010	3X6054	2.16
108	4	"Weekend at Bobby's"	Jensen Ackles	Andrew Dabb & Daniel Loflin	October 15, 2010	3X6051	2.84
109	5	"Live Free or Twihard"	Rod Hardy	Brett Matthews	October 22, 2010	3X6056	2.47
110	6	"You Can't Handle the Truth"	Jan Eliasberg	Story by : David Reed & Eric Charmelo & Nicole Snyder; Teleplay by : Eric Charmelo & Nicole Snyder	October 29, 2010	3X6055	2.52
111	7	"Family Matters"	Guy Bee	Andrew Dabb & Daniel Loflin	November 5, 2010	3X6057	2.46
112	8	"All Dogs Go to Heaven"	Phil Sgriccia	Adam Glass	November 12, 2010	3X6058	2.09
113	9	"Clap Your Hands If You Believe..."	John F. Showalter	Ben Edlund	November 19, 2010	3X6059	1.94
114	10	"Caged Heat"	Robert Singer	Story by : Jenny Klein and Brett Matthews; Teleplay by : Brett Matthews	December 3, 2010	3X6060	2.15
115	11	"Appointment in Samarra"	Mike Rohl	Sera Gamble & Robert Singer	December 10, 2010	3X6061	2.27
116	12	"Like a Virgin"	Phil Sgriccia	Adam Glass	February 4, 2011	3X6062	2.25
117	13	"Unforgiven"	David Barrett	Andrew Dabb & Daniel Loflin	February 11, 2011	3X6063	1.97
118	14	"Mannequin 3: The Reckoning"	Jeannot Szwarc	Eric Charmelo & Nicole Snyder	February 18, 2011	3X6064	2.25
119	15	"The French Mistake"	Charles Beeson	Ben Edlund	February 25, 2011	3X6065	2.18
120	16	"...And Then There Were None"	Mike Rohl	Brett Matthews	March 4, 2011	3X6066	2.14
121	17	"My Heart Will Go On"	Phil Sgriccia	Eric Charmelo & Nicole Snyder	April 15, 2011	3X6068	2.26
122	18	"Frontierland"	Guy Bee	Story by : Andrew Dabb & Daniel Loflin & Jackson Stewart; Teleplay by : Andrew Dabb & Daniel Loflin	April 22, 2011	3X6067	1.90
123	19	"Mommy Dearest"	John F. Showalter	Adam Glass	April 29, 2011	3X6069	2.01
124	20	"The Man Who Would Be King"	Ben Edlund	Ben Edlund	May 6, 2011	3X6070	2.11
125	21	"Let It Bleed"	John F. Showalter	Sera Gamble	May 20, 2011	3X6071	2.02
126	22	"The Man Who Knew Too Much"	Robert Singer	Eric Kripke	May 20, 2011	3X6072	2.11

=== Season 7 (2011–12) ===
No. overall	No. in season	Title	Directed by	Written by	Original release date	Prod. code	U.S. viewers (millions)
127	1	"Meet the New Boss"	Phil Sgriccia	Sera Gamble	September 23, 2011	3X7052	2.01
128	2	"Hello, Cruel World"	Guy Bee	Ben Edlund	September 30, 2011	3X7053	1.80
129	3	"The Girl Next Door"	Jensen Ackles	Andrew Dabb & Daniel Loflin	October 7, 2011	3X7051	1.72
130	4	"Defending Your Life"	Robert Singer	Adam Glass	October 14, 2011	3X7054	1.69
131	5	"Shut Up, Dr. Phil"	Phil Sgriccia	Brad Buckner & Eugenie Ross-Leming	October 21, 2011	3X7055	1.92
132	6	"Slash Fiction"	John F. Showalter	Robbie Thompson	October 28, 2011	3X7056	1.74
133	7	"The Mentalists"	Mike Rohl	Ben Acker & Ben Blacker	November 4, 2011	3X7057	1.84
134	8	"Season 7, Time for a Wedding!"	Tim Andrew	Andrew Dabb & Daniel Loflin	November 11, 2011	3X7058	1.85
135	9	"How to Win Friends and Influence Monsters"	Guy Bee	Ben Edlund	November 18, 2011	3X7059	1.55
136	10	"Death's Door"	Robert Singer	Sera Gamble	December 2, 2011	3X7060	1.89
137	11	"Adventures in Babysitting"	Jeannot Szwarc	Adam Glass	January 6, 2012	3X7061	1.82
138	12	"Time After Time"	Phil Sgriccia	Robbie Thompson	January 13, 2012	3X7062	1.55
139	13	"The Slice Girls"	Jerry Wanek	Eugenie Ross-Leming & Brad Buckner	February 3, 2012	3X7063	1.72
140	14	"Plucky Pennywhistle's Magical Menagerie"	Mike Rohl	Andrew Dabb & Daniel Loflin	February 10, 2012	3X7064	1.88
141	15	"Repo Man"	Thomas J. Wright	Ben Edlund	February 17, 2012	3X7065	1.74
142	16	"Out With the Old"	John F. Showalter	Robert Singer & Jenny Klein	March 16, 2012	3X7066	1.73
143	17	"The Born-Again Identity"	Robert Singer	Sera Gamble	March 23, 2012	3X7067	1.63
144	18	"Party On, Garth"	Phil Sgriccia	Adam Glass	March 30, 2012	3X7068	1.78
145	19	"Of Grave Importance"	Tim Andrew	Brad Buckner & Eugenie Ross-Leming	April 20, 2012	3X7069	1.57
146	20	"The Girl with the Dungeons and Dragons Tattoo"	John MacCarthy	Robbie Thompson	April 27, 2012	3X7070	1.61
147	21	"Reading Is Fundamental"	Ben Edlund	Ben Edlund	May 4, 2012	3X7071	1.66
148	22	"There Will Be Blood"	Guy Bee	Andrew Dabb & Daniel Loflin	May 11, 2012	3X7072	1.58
149	23	"Survival of the Fittest"	Robert Singer	Sera Gamble	May 18, 2012	3X7073	1.56

=== Season 8 (2012–13) ===
No. overall	No. in season	Title	Directed by	Written by	Original release date	Prod. code	U.S. viewers (millions)
150	1	"We Need to Talk About Kevin"	Robert Singer	Jeremy Carver	October 3, 2012	3X7802	1.85
151	2	"What's Up, Tiger Mommy?"	John F. Showalter	Andrew Dabb & Daniel Loflin	October 10, 2012	3X7803	2.51
152	3	"Heartache"	Jensen Ackles	Brad Buckner & Eugenie Ross-Leming	October 17, 2012	3X7801	2.13
153	4	"Bitten"	Thomas J. Wright	Robbie Thompson	October 24, 2012	3X7804	1.86
154	5	"Blood Brother"	Guy Bee	Ben Edlund	October 31, 2012	3X7805	1.78
155	6	"Southern Comfort"	Tim Andrew	Adam Glass	November 7, 2012	3X7806	2.32
156	7	"A Little Slice of Kevin"	Charles Robert Carner	Eugenie Ross-Leming & Brad Buckner	November 14, 2012	3X7807	2.32
157	8	"Hunteri Heroici"	Paul Edwards	Andrew Dabb	November 28, 2012	3X7808	2.00
158	9	"Citizen Fang"	Nick Copus	Daniel Loflin	December 5, 2012	3X7809	2.06
159	10	"Torn and Frayed"	Robert Singer	Jenny Klein	January 16, 2013	3X7810	1.99
160	11	"LARP and the Real Girl"	Jeannot Szwarc	Robbie Thompson	January 23, 2013	3X7811	2.01
161	12	"As Time Goes By"	Serge Ladouceur	Adam Glass	January 30, 2013	3X7812	2.12
162	13	"Everybody Hates Hitler"	Phil Sgriccia	Ben Edlund	February 6, 2013	3X7814	2.29
163	14	"Trial and Error"	Kevin Parks	Andrew Dabb	February 13, 2013	3X7813	2.41
164	15	"Man's Best Friend with Benefits"	John F. Showalter	Brad Buckner & Eugenie Ross-Leming	February 20, 2013	3X7815	2.10
165	16	"Remember the Titans"	Steve Boyum	Daniel Loflin	February 27, 2013	3X7816	2.13
166	17	"Goodbye Stranger"	Thomas J. Wright	Robbie Thompson	March 20, 2013	3X7817	2.16
167	18	"Freaks and Geeks"	John F. Showalter	Adam Glass	March 27, 2013	3X7818	2.23
168	19	"Taxi Driver"	Guy Norman Bee	Eugenie Ross-Leming & Brad Buckner	April 3, 2013	3X7819	1.90
169	20	"Pac-Man Fever"	Robert Singer	Robbie Thompson	April 24, 2013	3X7820	2.38
170	21	"The Great Escapist"	Robert Duncan McNeill	Ben Edlund	May 1, 2013	3X7821	2.07
171	22	"Clip Show"	Thomas J. Wright	Andrew Dabb	May 8, 2013	3X7822	2.07
172	23	"Sacrifice"	Phil Sgriccia	Jeremy Carver	May 15, 2013	3X7823	2.31

=== Season 9 (2013–14) ===
No. overall	No. in season	Title	Directed by	Written by	Original release date	Prod. code	U.S. viewers (millions)
173	1	"I Think I'm Gonna Like It Here"	John F. Showalter	Jeremy Carver	October 8, 2013	4X5052	2.59
174	2	"Devil May Care"	Guy Norman Bee	Andrew Dabb	October 15, 2013	4X5051	2.33
175	3	"I'm No Angel"	Kevin Hooks	Brad Buckner & Eugenie Ross-Leming	October 22, 2013	4X5053	2.34
176	4	"Slumber Party"	Robert Singer	Robbie Thompson	October 29, 2013	4X5054	2.19
177	5	"Dog Dean Afternoon"	Tim Andrew	Eric Charmelo & Nicole Snyder	November 5, 2013	4X5056	2.15
178	6	"Heaven Can't Wait"	Rob Spera	Robert Berens	November 12, 2013	4X5057	2.36
179	7	"Bad Boys"	Kevin Parks	Adam Glass	November 19, 2013	4X5055	2.01
180	8	"Rock and a Hard Place"	John MacCarthy	Jenny Klein	November 26, 2013	4X5058	2.39
181	9	"Holy Terror"	Thomas J. Wright	Eugenie Ross-Leming & Brad Buckner	December 3, 2013	4X5059	2.42
182	10	"Road Trip"	Robert Singer	Andrew Dabb	January 14, 2014	4X5060	2.21
183	11	"First Born"	John Badham	Robbie Thompson	January 21, 2014	4X5061	2.65
184	12	"Sharp Teeth"	John F. Showalter	Adam Glass	January 28, 2014	4X5062	2.76
185	13	"The Purge"	Phil Sgriccia	Eric Charmelo & Nicole Snyder	February 4, 2014	4X5063	2.46
186	14	"Captives"	Jerry Wanek	Robert Berens	February 25, 2014	4X5064	2.12
187	15	"#THINMAN"	Jeannot Szwarc	Jenny Klein	March 4, 2014	4X5066	1.93
188	16	"Blade Runners"	Serge Ladouceur	Brad Buckner & Eugenie Ross-Leming	March 18, 2014	4X5065	1.86
189	17	"Mother's Little Helper"	Misha Collins	Adam Glass	March 25, 2014	4X5067	2.25
190	18	"Meta Fiction"	Thomas J. Wright	Robbie Thompson	April 15, 2014	4X5068	1.60
191	19	"Alex Annie Alexis Ann"	Stefan Pleszczynski	Robert Berens	April 22, 2014	4X5069	2.10
192	20	"Bloodlines"	Robert Singer	Andrew Dabb	April 29, 2014	4X5070	2.03
193	21	"King of the Damned"	P. J. Pesce	Eugenie Ross-Leming & Brad Buckner	May 6, 2014	4X5071	1.59
194	22	"Stairway to Heaven"	Guy Norman Bee	Andrew Dabb	May 13, 2014	4X5072	1.74
195	23	"Do You Believe in Miracles?"	Thomas J. Wright	Jeremy Carver	May 20, 2014	4X5073	2.30

=== Season 10 (2014–15) ===
No. overall	No. in season	Title	Directed by	Written by	Original release date	Prod. code	U.S. viewers (millions)
196	1	"Black"	Robert Singer	Jeremy Carver	October 7, 2014	4X5802	2.50
197	2	"Reichenbach"	Thomas J. Wright	Andrew Dabb	October 14, 2014	4X5803	2.13
198	3	"Soul Survivor"	Jensen Ackles	Brad Buckner & Eugenie Ross-Leming	October 21, 2014	4X5801	2.08
199	4	"Paper Moon"	Jeannot Szwarc	Adam Glass	October 28, 2014	4X5804	1.93
200	5	"Fan Fiction"	Phil Sgriccia	Robbie Thompson	November 11, 2014	4X5805	2.17
201	6	"Ask Jeeves"	John MacCarthy	Eric Carmelo & Nicole Snyder	November 18, 2014	4X5806	2.54
202	7	"Girls, Girls, Girls"	Robert Singer	Robert Berens	November 25, 2014	4X5807	2.30
203	8	"Hibbing 911"	Tim Andrew	Story by : Jenny Klein & Phil Sgriccia; Teleplay by : Jenny Klein	December 2, 2014	4X5808	2.33
204	9	"The Things We Left Behind"	Guy Norman Bee	Andrew Dabb	December 9, 2014	4X5809	2.62
205	10	"The Hunter Games"	John Badham	Eugenie Ross-Leming & Brad Buckner	January 20, 2015	4X5811	2.42
206	11	"There's No Place Like Home"	Phil Sgriccia	Robbie Thompson	January 27, 2015	4X5810	2.06
207	12	"About a Boy"	Serge Ladouceur	Adam Glass	February 3, 2015	4X5812	2.21
208	13	"Halt & Catch Fire"	John F. Showalter	Eric Charmelo & Nicole Snyder	February 10, 2015	4X5813	1.98
209	14	"The Executioner's Song"	Phil Sgriccia	Robert Berens	February 17, 2015	4X5814	2.09
210	15	"The Things They Carried"	John Badham	Jenny Klein	March 18, 2015	4X5815	1.73
211	16	"Paint It Black"	John F. Showalter	Brad Buckner & Eugenie Ross-Leming	March 25, 2015	4X5816	1.70
212	17	"Inside Man"	Rashaad Ernesto Green	Andrew Dabb	April 1, 2015	4X5817	1.70
213	18	"Book of the Damned"	P. J. Pesce	Robbie Thompson	April 15, 2015	4X5818	1.76
214	19	"The Werther Project"	Stefan Pleszczynski	Robert Berens	April 22, 2015	4X5819	1.63
215	20	"Angel Heart"	Steve Boyum	Robbie Thompson	April 29, 2015	4X5820	1.74
216	21	"Dark Dynasty"	Robert Singer	Eugenie Ross-Leming & Brad Buckner	May 6, 2015	4X5823	1.45
217	22	"The Prisoner"	Thomas J. Wright	Andrew Dabb	May 13, 2015	4X5821	1.75
218	23	"Brother's Keeper"	Phil Sgriccia	Jeremy Carver	May 20, 2015	4X5822	1.73

=== Season 11 (2015–16) ===
No. overall	No. in season	Title	Directed by	Written by	Original release date	Prod. code	U.S. viewers (millions)
219	1	"Out of the Darkness, Into the Fire"	Robert Singer	Jeremy Carver	October 7, 2015	4X6252	1.94
220	2	"Form and Void"	Phil Sgriccia	Andrew Dabb	October 14, 2015	4X6253	1.85
221	3	"The Bad Seed"	Jensen Ackles	Brad Buckner & Eugenie Ross-Leming	October 21, 2015	4X6251	1.59
222	4	"Baby"	Thomas J. Wright	Robbie Thompson	October 28, 2015	4X6254	2.04
223	5	"Thin Lizzie"	Rashaad Ernesto Green	Nancy Won	November 4, 2015	4X6255	1.64
224	6	"Our Little World"	John F. Showalter	Robert Berens	November 11, 2015	4X6256	1.70
225	7	"Plush"	Tim Andrew	Eric Charmelo & Nicole Snyder	November 18, 2015	4X6257	1.66
226	8	"Just My Imagination"	Richard Speight Jr.	Jenny Klein	December 2, 2015	4X6258	2.00
227	9	"O Brother Where Art Thou?"	Robert Singer	Eugenie Ross-Leming & Brad Buckner	December 9, 2015	4X6259	1.90
228	10	"The Devil in the Details"	Thomas J. Wright	Andrew Dabb	January 20, 2016	4X6260	1.83
229	11	"Into the Mystic"	John Badham	Robbie Thompson	January 27, 2016	4X6261	1.88
230	12	"Don't You Forget About Me"	Stefan Pleszczynski	Nancy Won	February 3, 2016	4X6262	1.87
231	13	"Love Hurts"	Phil Sgriccia	Eric Charmelo & Nicole Snyder	February 10, 2016	4X6263	1.83
232	14	"The Vessel"	John Badham	Robert Berens	February 17, 2016	4X6264	1.98
233	15	"Beyond the Mat"	Jerry Wanek	John Bring & Andrew Dabb	February 24, 2016	4X6265	1.85
234	16	"Safe House"	Stefan Pleszczynski	Robbie Thompson	March 23, 2016	4X6266	1.69
235	17	"Red Meat"	Nina Lopez-Corrado	Robert Berens & Andrew Dabb	March 30, 2016	4X6267	1.45
236	18	"Hell's Angel"	Phil Sgriccia	Brad Buckner & Eugenie Ross-Leming	April 6, 2016	4X6268	1.75
237	19	"The Chitters"	Eduardo Sánchez	Nancy Won	April 27, 2016	4X6269	1.67
238	20	"Don't Call Me Shurley"	Robert Singer	Robbie Thompson	May 4, 2016	4X6270	1.54
239	21	"All in the Family"	Thomas J. Wright	Eugenie Ross-Leming & Brad Buckner	May 11, 2016	4X6271	1.75
240	22	"We Happy Few"	John Badham	Robert Berens	May 18, 2016	4X6272	1.59
241	23	"Alpha and Omega"	Phil Sgriccia	Andrew Dabb	May 25, 2016	4X6273	1.84

=== Season 12 (2016–17) ===
No. overall	No. in season	Title	Directed by	Written by	Original release date	Prod. code	U.S. viewers (millions)
242	1	"Keep Calm and Carry On"	Phil Sgriccia	Andrew Dabb	October 13, 2016	T13.19951	2.15
243	2	"Mamma Mia"	Thomas J. Wright	Brad Buckner & Eugenie Ross-Leming	October 20, 2016	T13.19952	1.61
244	3	"The Foundry"	Robert Singer	Robert Berens	October 27, 2016	T13.19953	1.68
245	4	"American Nightmare"	John F. Showalter	Davy Perez	November 3, 2016	T13.19954	1.81
246	5	"The One You've Been Waiting For"	Nina Lopez-Corrado	Meredith Glynn	November 10, 2016	T13.19955	1.70
247	6	"Celebrating the Life of Asa Fox"	John Badham	Steve Yockey	November 17, 2016	T13.19956	1.80
248	7	"Rock Never Dies"	Eduardo Sánchez	Robert Berens	December 1, 2016	T13.19957	1.80
249	8	"LOTUS"	Phil Sgriccia	Eugenie Ross-Leming & Brad Buckner	December 8, 2016	T13.19958	1.73
250	9	"First Blood"	Robert Singer	Andrew Dabb	January 26, 2017	T13.19959	1.72
251	10	"Lily Sunder Has Some Regrets"	Thomas J. Wright	Steve Yockey	February 2, 2017	T13.19960	1.73
252	11	"Regarding Dean"	John Badham	Meredith Glynn	February 9, 2017	T13.19961	1.73
253	12	"Stuck in the Middle (With You)"	Richard Speight Jr.	Davy Perez	February 16, 2017	T13.19962	1.81
254	13	"Family Feud"	P. J. Pesce	Brad Buckner & Eugenie Ross-Leming	February 23, 2017	T13.19963	1.62
255	14	"The Raid"	John MacCarthy	Robert Berens	March 2, 2017	T13.19964	1.63
256	15	"Somewhere Between Heaven and Hell"	Nina Lopez-Corrado	Davy Perez	March 9, 2017	T13.19965	1.49
257	16	"Ladies Drink Free"	Amyn Kaderali	Meredith Glynn	March 30, 2017	T13.19966	1.71
258	17	"The British Invasion"	John F. Showalter	Eugenie Ross-Leming & Brad Buckner	April 6, 2017	T13.19967	1.57
259	18	"The Memory Remains"	Phil Sgriccia	John Bring	April 13, 2017	T13.19968	1.58
260	19	"The Future"	Amanda Tapping	Robert Berens & Meredith Glynn	April 27, 2017	T13.19969	1.38
261	20	"Twigs & Twine & Tasha Banes"	Richard Speight Jr.	Steve Yockey	May 4, 2017	T13.19970	1.51
262	21	"There's Something About Mary"	P. J. Pesce	Brad Buckner & Eugenie Ross-Leming	May 11, 2017	T13.19971	1.42
263	22	"Who We Are"	John F. Showalter	Robert Berens	May 18, 2017	T13.19972	1.75
264	23	"All Along the Watchtower"	Robert Singer	Andrew Dabb	May 18, 2017	T13.19973	1.65

=== Season 13 (2017–18) ===
No. overall	No. in season	Title	Directed by	Written by	Original release date	Prod. code	U.S. viewers (millions)
265	1	"Lost and Found"	Phil Sgriccia	Andrew Dabb	October 12, 2017	T13.20551	2.10
266	2	"The Rising Son"	Thomas J. Wright	Eugenie Ross-Leming & Brad Buckner	October 19, 2017	T13.20552	1.90
267	3	"Patience"	Robert Singer	Robert Berens	October 26, 2017	T13.20553	1.93
268	4	"The Big Empty"	John Badham	Meredith Glynn	November 2, 2017	T13.20554	1.82
269	5	"Advanced Thanatology"	John F. Showalter	Steve Yockey	November 9, 2017	T13.20555	1.71
270	6	"Tombstone"	Nina Lopez-Corrado	Davy Perez	November 16, 2017	T13.20556	1.89
271	7	"War of the Worlds"	Richard Speight Jr.	Brad Buckner & Eugenie Ross-Leming	November 23, 2017	T13.20557	1.24
272	8	"The Scorpion and the Frog"	Robert Singer	Meredith Glynn	November 30, 2017	T13.20558	1.73
273	9	"The Bad Place"	Phil Sgriccia	Robert Berens	December 7, 2017	T13.20559	1.74
274	10	"Wayward Sisters"	Phil Sgriccia	Robert Berens & Andrew Dabb	January 18, 2018	T13.20560	1.85
275	11	"Breakdown"	Amyn Kaderali	Davy Perez	January 25, 2018	T13.20561	1.93
276	12	"Various & Sundry Villains"	Amanda Tapping	Steve Yockey	February 1, 2018	T13.20562	1.68
277	13	"Devil's Bargain"	Eduardo Sánchez	Eugenie Ross-Leming & Brad Buckner	February 8, 2018	T13.20563	1.81
278	14	"Good Intentions"	P. J. Pesce	Meredith Glynn	March 1, 2018	T13.20564	1.61
279	15	"A Most Holy Man"	Amanda Tapping	Robert Singer & Andrew Dabb	March 8, 2018	T13.20565	1.66
280	16	"Scoobynatural"	Robert Singer	Jim Krieg & Jeremy Adams	March 29, 2018	T13.20566	2.03
281	17	"The Thing"	John F. Showalter	Davy Perez	April 5, 2018	T13.20567	1.41
282	18	"Bring 'em Back Alive"	Amyn Kaderali	Brad Buckner & Eugenie Ross-Leming	April 12, 2018	T13.20568	1.53
283	19	"Funeralia"	Nina Lopez-Corrado	Steve Yockey	April 19, 2018	T13.20569	1.38
284	20	"Unfinished Business"	Richard Speight Jr.	Meredith Glynn	April 26, 2018	T13.20570	1.51
285	21	"Beat the Devil"	Phil Sgriccia	Robert Berens	May 3, 2018	T13.20571	1.39
286	22	"Exodus"	Thomas J. Wright	Eugenie Ross-Leming & Brad Buckner	May 10, 2018	T13.20572	1.30
287	23	"Let the Good Times Roll"	Robert Singer	Andrew Dabb	May 17, 2018	T13.20573	1.63

=== Season 14 (2018–19) ===
No. overall	No. in season	Title	Directed by	Written by	Original release date	Prod. code	U.S. viewers (millions)
288	1	"Stranger in a Strange Land"	Thomas J. Wright	Andrew Dabb	October 11, 2018	T13.21151	1.49
289	2	"Gods and Monsters"	Richard Speight Jr.	Brad Buckner & Eugenie Ross-Leming	October 18, 2018	T13.21152	1.53
290	3	"The Scar"	Robert Singer	Robert Berens	October 25, 2018	T13.21153	1.39
291	4	"Mint Condition"	Amyn Kaderali	Davy Perez	November 1, 2018	T13.21154	1.46
292	5	"Nightmare Logic"	Darren Grant	Meredith Glynn	November 8, 2018	T13.21155	1.43
293	6	"Optimism"	Richard Speight Jr.	Steve Yockey	November 15, 2018	T13.21156	1.48
294	7	"Unhuman Nature"	John F. Showalter	Eugenie Ross-Leming & Brad Buckner	November 29, 2018	T13.21157	1.49
295	8	"Byzantium"	Eduardo Sánchez	Meredith Glynn	December 6, 2018	T13.21158	1.53
296	9	"The Spear"	Amyn Kaderali	Robert Berens	December 13, 2018	T13.21159	1.43
297	10	"Nihilism"	Amanda Tapping	Steve Yockey	January 17, 2019	T13.21160	1.44
298	11	"Damaged Goods"	Phil Sgriccia	Davy Perez	January 24, 2019	T13.21161	1.44
299	12	"Prophet and Loss"	Thomas J. Wright	Brad Buckner & Eugenie Ross-Leming	January 31, 2019	T13.21162	1.40
300	13	"Lebanon"	Robert Singer	Andrew Dabb & Meredith Glynn	February 7, 2019	T13.21163	1.64
301	14	"Ouroboros"	Amyn Kaderali	Steve Yockey	March 7, 2019	T13.21164	1.28
302	15	"Peace of Mind"	Phil Sgriccia	Story by : Meghan Fitzmartin & Steve Yockey; Teleplay by : Meghan Fitzmartin	March 14, 2019	T13.21166	1.51
303	16	"Don't Go in the Woods"	John Fitzpatrick	Davy Perez & Nick Vaught	March 21, 2019	T13.21165	1.46
304	17	"Game Night"	John F. Showalter	Meredith Glynn	April 4, 2019	T13.21167	1.25
305	18	"Absence"	Nina Lopez-Corrado	Robert Berens	April 11, 2019	T13.21168	1.47
306	19	"Jack in the Box"	Robert Singer	Eugenie Ross-Leming & Brad Buckner	April 18, 2019	T13.21169	1.28
307	20	"Moriah"	Phil Sgriccia	Andrew Dabb	April 25, 2019	T13.21170	1.30

=== Season 15 (2019–20) ===
No. overall	No. in season	Title	Directed by	Written by	Original release date	Prod. code	U.S. viewers (millions)
308	1	"Back and to the Future"	John F. Showalter	Andrew Dabb	October 10, 2019	T13.21752	1.23
309	2	"Raising Hell"	Robert Singer	Brad Buckner & Eugenie Ross-Leming	October 17, 2019	T13.21753	1.16
310	3	"The Rupture"	Charles Beeson	Robert Berens	October 24, 2019	T13.21754	1.24
311	4	"Atomic Monsters"	Jensen Ackles	Davy Perez	November 7, 2019	T13.21751	1.10
312	5	"Proverbs 17:3"	Richard Speight Jr.	Steve Yockey	November 14, 2019	T13.21755	1.30
313	6	"Golden Time"	John F. Showalter	Meredith Glynn	November 21, 2019	T13.21756	1.14
314	7	"Last Call"	Amyn Kaderali	Jeremy Adams	December 5, 2019	T13.21757	1.06
315	8	"Our Father, Who Aren't in Heaven"	Richard Speight Jr.	Eugenie Ross-Leming & Brad Buckner	December 12, 2019	T13.21758	1.09
316	9	"The Trap"	Robert Singer	Robert Berens	January 16, 2020	T13.21759	1.13
317	10	"The Heroes' Journey"	John F. Showalter	Andrew Dabb	January 23, 2020	T13.21760	0.99
318	11	"The Gamblers"	Charles Beeson	Story by : Meredith Glynn & Davy Perez; Teleplay by : Meredith Glynn	January 30, 2020	T13.21761	1.07
319	12	"Galaxy Brain"	Richard Speight Jr.	Story by : Meredith Glynn & Robert Berens; Teleplay by : Robert Berens	March 16, 2020	T13.21762	0.98
320	13	"Destiny's Child"	Amyn Kaderali	Brad Buckner & Eugenie Ross-Leming	March 23, 2020	T13.21763	1.06
321	14	"Last Holiday"	Eduardo Sánchez	Jeremy Adams	October 8, 2020	T13.21764	1.13
322	15	"Gimme Shelter"	Matt Cohen	Davy Perez	October 15, 2020	T13.21765	1.07
323	16	"Drag Me Away (From You)"	Amyn Kaderali	Meghan Fitzmartin	October 22, 2020	T13.21766	0.92
324	17	"Unity"	Catriona McKenzie	Meredith Glynn	October 29, 2020	T13.21767	0.91
325	18	"Despair"	Richard Speight Jr.	Robert Berens	November 5, 2020	T13.21768	1.02
326	19	"Inherit the Earth"	John F. Showalter	Eugenie Ross-Leming & Brad Buckner	November 12, 2020	T13.21769	1.00
327	20	"Carry On"	Robert Singer	Andrew Dabb	November 19, 2020	T13.21770	1.38

== Home video releases ==
Season	DVD and Blu-ray release dates		
Season	Region 1	Region 2	Region 4
1	September 5, 2006 (DVD); June 15, 2010 (Blu-ray)	October 2, 2006 (DVD); August 22, 2011 (Blu-ray)	September 6, 2006 (DVD); October 27, 2010 (Blu-ray)
2	September 11, 2007 (DVD); June 14, 2011 (Blu-ray)	October 29, 2007 (DVD); August 22, 2011 (Blu-ray)	October 3, 2007 (DVD); October 26, 2011 (Blu-ray)
3	September 2, 2008 (DVD); November 11, 2008 (Blu-ray)	August 25, 2008 (DVD); November 10, 2008 (Blu-ray)	September 30, 2008 (DVD); March 4, 2009 (Blu-ray)
4	September 1, 2009	November 2, 2009	January 6, 2010
5	September 7, 2010	October 18, 2010	November 10, 2010
6	September 13, 2011	November 7, 2011	November 2, 2011
7	September 18, 2012	November 5, 2012	October 31, 2012
8	September 10, 2013	October 28, 2013	September 25, 2013
9	September 9, 2014	June 8, 2015	October 8, 2014
10	September 8, 2015	March 21, 2016	September 9, 2015
11	September 6, 2016	October 10, 2016	September 7, 2016
12	September 5, 2017	September 4, 2017	September 6, 2017
13	September 4, 2018	October 1, 2018	September 5, 2018
14	September 10, 2019	August 24, 2020	September 11, 2019
15	May 25, 2021	May 24, 2021	May 26, 2021
