= Supernatural season 12 =

Season of television series

Supernatural
- Season 12
- DVD cover art
- Showrunners: Andrew Dabb; Robert Singer
- Starring: Jared Padalecki; Jensen Ackles; Mark A. Sheppard; Mark Pellegrino; Misha Collins
- No. of episodes: 23

Release
- Original network: The CW
- Original release: October 13, 2016 – May 18, 2017

Season chronology
- ← Previous; Season 11 Next → Season 13

The twelfth season of Supernatural, an American dark fantasy television series created by Eric Kripke, premiered on October 13, 2016, on The CW and concluded on May 18, 2017. The season consisted of 23 episodes and aired on Thursdays at 9:00 pm (ET) for the first 8 episodes before moving to 8:00 pm (ET) in January 2017. This is the first season with Andrew Dabb and Robert Singer as showrunners. The season follows Sam and Dean dealing with the resurrection of their mother while trying to stop Lucifer from creating a Nephilim, while also being the target of a faction called The British Men of Letters.

== Cast ==
=== Starring ===
- Jared Padalecki as Sam Winchester
- Jensen Ackles as Dean Winchester
- Mark A. Sheppard as Crowley (Note: Only credited for their respective episode appearances.)
- Mark Pellegrino as Lucifer (Note: Pellegrino is only credited for his respective episode appearances, and is also credited in the special appearance bill in "Stuck in the Middle (With You)".)
- Misha Collins as Castiel

=== Special guest star ===
- Rick Springfield as Vincent "Vince" Vincente / Lucifer

=== Special appearance by ===
- Jim Beaver as Bobby Singer

=== Guest stars ===
- Samantha Smith as Mary Winchester
- Elizabeth Blackmore as Lady Antonia "Toni" Bevell
- Ruth Connell as Rowena MacLeod
- Kim Rhodes as Sheriff Jody Mills
- Adam Fergus as Mick Davies
- David Chisum as U.S. President Jefferson "Jeff" Rooney / Lucifer
- Courtney Ford as Kelly Kline
- Kara Royster as Alicia Banes
- Kendrick Sampson as Max Banes
- Kathryn Newton as Claire Novak
- Katherine Ramdeen as Alex Jones
- Adam Rose as Aaron Bass
- Woody Jeffreys as Tommy
- Alicia Witt as Lily Sunder
- Lisa Berry as Billie
- David Haydn-Jones as Arthur Ketch
- Theo Devaney as Gavin MacLeod
- Rick Worthy as Alpha Vampire
- Shoshannah Stern as Eileen Leahy
- Alexander Calvert as Jack Kline
- Gillian Barber as Dr. Hess
- Ali Ahn as Dagon

== Episodes ==
No. overall	No. in season	Title	Directed by	Written by	Original release date	Prod. code	U.S. viewers (millions)
242	1	"Keep Calm and Carry On"	Phil Sgriccia	Andrew Dabb	October 13, 2016	T13.19951	2.15
Toni Bevell takes the kidnapped Sam Winchester to a veterinarian to treat the gunshot wound she inflicted in the eleventh season finale "Alpha and Omega", before taking him to another location to question him. Toni explains that the British Men of Letters have kept Britain safe from monsters and now want to expand their influence into the United States. To this end, Toni demands information on all of the hunters in the US from Sam and when he refuses to give her what she wants, she has her assistant Ms. Watt torture him. When Sam doesn't break under physical torture, Toni drugs him in order to torture him mentally with images of his loved ones dying. Sam sees through it and tricks Toni, but is narrowly prevented from escaping. At the same time, his brother Dean finds their long-dead mother, Mary Winchester, who has been resurrected, and convinces Mary of his identity before filling her in on what she missed in the 33 years following her murder. Returning to the Bunker, the two learn of Sam's disappearance and begin tracking him with the help of a returned Castiel. Eventually, Dean is able to call Toni, who refuses to give back Sam and sends Ms. Watt to kill them. Though Ms. Watt initially has the upper hand, Mary kills her with Castiel's angel blade and they are able to use her cellphone to track Sam to Aldrich, Missouri. Meanwhile, after being expelled from Castiel, Lucifer has begun searching for a new suitable vessel but is burning them out fast in his weakened state. Intending to kill Lucifer and reclaim his rule of Hell, Crowley attempts to track Lucifer down without success.
243	2	"Mamma Mia"	Thomas J. Wright	Brad Buckner & Eugenie Ross-Leming	October 20, 2016	T13.19952	1.61
Antonia "Toni"'s interrogation of Sam continues as Castiel tracks them to a warded farm house. Mary insists on going despite Dean's protests. Dean tries to sneak in, but is captured and tortured in front of Sam. Mary is able to distract Toni long enough for Dean to knock her out. Mick Davies of the British Men of Letters arrives, letting Castiel join them. He states that Toni went too far and that the Men of Letters want to work with hunters like the Winchesters to keep America safe. Sam reunites with Mary, elated she is alive. She mournfully looks over John's journal. Toni refuses to admit she did anything wrong since the Winchesters are too dangerous, and Mick reveals he has already sent for Arthur Ketch, whom Toni seems wary of, to assist them with the Winchesters. Meanwhile, Crowley interrupts his witch mother Rowena's date to find Lucifer, who takes over the body of washed-up rock-star Vince Vincente. Crowley's plan to break Lucifer's vessel and send him back to the Cage fails, so Crowley flees and Lucifer takes Rowena prisoner.
244	3	"The Foundry"	Robert Singer	Robert Berens	October 27, 2016	T13.19953	1.68
In Saint Paul, Minnesota, a couple is found in an abandoned house dead of frostbite after hearing a crying baby inside. Mary insists they take the case, surprising Sam, who worries she is burying her emotions. After the appearance of a child ghost, Sam and Dean learn several children have died in that house, and they leave to burn their bones. Mary investigates the house and finds that the children's ghosts are still there. The father of the first girl who died had killed himself in the house, and his ghost has been killing kids and keeping their spirits there ever since. He possesses Mary and attacks Dean, but Sam burns his bones to stop the man's ghost and release the children's spirits. Mary, admitting she is mourning John and the little boys she used to have, leaves the bunker to be alone. Meanwhile, Castiel reluctantly teams up with Crowley to find Lucifer, who demands Rowena make his vessel stronger, but she tricks him as her spell decays the body and sends him to the bottom of the ocean. She agrees to work with Castiel and Crowley the next time they corner Lucifer.
245	4	"American Nightmare"	John F. Showalter	Davy Perez	November 3, 2016	T13.19954	1.81
In Mason City, Iowa, a Child Protective Services worker dies after walking into a church, bleeding, being whipped by something unseen, and speaking in tongues. After the Winchesters begin investigating, a local grocery stock boy dies the same way. The two victims are connected to a deeply religious family whose daughter Magda died of pneumonia. While Dean believes the first victim's Wiccan co-worker is responsible, Sam suspects Magda's ghost is causing the deaths and goes to the family's home, where he discovers Magda alive in the basement, considered the devil by her family for her psychic abilities and is forced by her mother to whip herself. Magda's powers caused the two victims' deaths when she tried to reach out to them for help. Sam is captured, and with their secret exposed, her mother secretly plans for them to die as a family by feeding them a poisoned dinner, which kills her husband. Magda's brother sacrifices himself to save Magda from their mother, and Sam talks Magda out of murdering her mother, who is later arrested. Encouraged by Sam, Magda begins traveling to live with an aunt in California, but at a rest stop, she is killed by Ketch, who has been following and monitoring the Winchesters, to finish the job.
246	5	"The One You've Been Waiting For"	Nina Lopez-Corrado	Meredith Glynn	November 10, 2016	T13.19955	1.70
In Columbus, Ohio, an elderly woman attempts to buy an antique pocket watch, only to be murdered along with the owner of the antique store by the Thule Society, an organization of Nazi necromancers previously introduced in Season 8. The murders draw the attention of the Winchesters, who learn from a young Thule member named Christoph that the watch holds the soul of Adolf Hitler and the Thule intend to use his descendant Ellie to resurrect him. The Thule succeed in abducting Ellie and resurrecting Hitler in the body of the Thule leader, but after Christoph aids the Winchesters in finding the Thule, Ellie and the Winchesters kill the Thule High Command and Dean kills Hitler. After burning the bodies of the Thule, Ellie finally stops running from everything while Christoph is forced on the run from what's left of the Thule Society.
247	6	"Celebrating the Life of Asa Fox"	John Badham	Steve Yockey	November 17, 2016	T13.19956	1.80
In 1980, Emerson, Manitoba, a young boy named Asa Fox is saved from a werewolf by Mary and, inspired by the meeting, becomes a legendary hunter after he grows up, before being killed in 2016. Learning of Asa's death, many hunters go to his wake, including Sam, Dean, Mary, and Sheriff Jody Mills, who had been in a relationship with Asa. Things are awkward between the Winchesters before one of the hunters is found murdered. They soon realize that they are dealing with Jael, a demon who has had a grudge against Asa since Asa exorcised him in 1997. Jael locks Dean out of the house and everyone else in, but Dean is able to get in with help from the reaper Billie in exchange for owing her one. Jael kills another hunter before possessing Jody and revealing that he did not kill Asa as believed; rather, Asa was accidentally killed by his best friend Bucky while hunting Jael, and Bucky framed Jael to protect himself. While Jael is distracted with Bucky, the hunters manage to exorcise him from Jody. They promise to spread the true story of Asa's death, disgracing Bucky. The next morning, the three dead hunters are burned while Billie arrives to try and collect on her deal with Dean by reaping Mary, who she claims will never feel like she belongs in the world after her resurrection. Mary refuses and though she decides not to return to the Bunker yet, she agrees to go out for breakfast with her children.
248	7	"Rock Never Dies"	Eduardo Sánchez	Robert Berens	December 1, 2016	T13.19957	1.80
Temporarily fixing his vessel with one of his fossilized angel feathers, Lucifer revives Vince Vincente's rock career in Los Angeles for fresh worshipers. Dean, Sam, Castiel, and Crowley try intimidating those in Vince's circle to find out where his concert will be held, without success until Lucifer's forcing Vince's manager to kill himself gets bandmate Tommy to text Castiel the location. Lucifer kills the rest of the band and beats Castiel and Crowley, though the Winchesters scare the rest of the humans away to safety. Lucifer reveals he has no plan and is upset that God apologized to him only to leave again to be with Amara. Now Lucifer believes everything is pointless and he just wants to have fun by making people suffer. The effort of the battle burns through Vince's body and Lucifer escapes with a promise to go onto bigger things.
249	8	"LOTUS"	Phil Sgriccia	Eugenie Ross-Leming & Brad Buckner	December 8, 2016	T13.19958	1.73
Lucifer begins possessing people of power and influence, eventually possessing Jefferson Rooney, the President of the United States. While possessing Rooney, Lucifer conceives a powerful half-angel Nephilim with Rooney's unsuspecting staffer Kelly Kline, while his actions draw the attention of the Winchesters, Crowley, Castiel, and Rowena. Lucifer sends the Secret Service to kill the Winchesters, but they are rescued by Ketch, who provides them with a device capable of expelling any angel or demon from their vessel. To draw Lucifer out into the open, Crowley kidnaps Kelly. They are able to convince her of the truth and she calls Lucifer to a motel room where the Winchesters, Castiel, Crowley, and Rowena ambush him. Using Ketch's device, Sam is able to exorcise Lucifer from Rooney, and Rowena casts a spell believed to banish him back to his cage. However, the Winchesters are arrested by the Secret Service, who believe they were attempting to assassinate the President, and rather than aborting the Nephilim, Kelly flees from Castiel.
250	9	"First Blood"	Robert Singer	Andrew Dabb	January 26, 2017	T13.19959	1.72
The Winchesters are taken to a government black site in the Rocky Mountain National Park, where they are locked in separate cells until they are willing to talk. After nearly two months, they are found dead by the guards, but suddenly revive and escape. At the same time, Mary and Castiel attempt to find them without luck. With the Winchesters gone, monster activity goes on the rise and Castiel begins to see just how important his friends are. After escaping, the Winchesters contact Castiel to meet them when they get out of the forest and go on the run from government soldiers. Sam and Dean are able to defeat the soldiers, then reunite with Castiel and Mary, who have found them with the help of Mick and Ketch. Driving away, they are stopped by Billie and it is revealed that the Winchesters made a deal with her in which they would temporarily die and come back in exchange for a Winchester dying permanently at midnight or face cosmic consequences. Mary chooses to sacrifice herself for her sons, but Castiel kills Billie instead, telling the horrified Winchesters that they are all too important for the world to lose. At the same time, Mick unsuccessfully attempts to make connections with the American hunters. However, when Mick approaches Mary, she is shown to be more open to listening since he helped rescue Sam and Dean, though she is unaware that Mick had Ketch kill everyone at the black site so as to leave no "loose ends".
251	10	"Lily Sunder Has Some Regrets"	Thomas J. Wright	Steve Yockey	February 2, 2017	T13.19960	1.73
An angel named Benjamin is murdered, drawing the attention of a flight of angels he had been a part of including Ishim, Mirabel and Castiel. The Winchesters and Castiel investigate the murder, only to have Mirabel killed as well by Lily Sunder, who flees when the Winchesters intervene. Castiel and Ishim explain that in 1901, Lily had married an angel named Akobel and had a Nephilim daughter. As this was against Heaven's laws, they killed Akobel and his daughter May; now Lily wants revenge. The Winchesters track down Lily and are shocked to learn that her daughter was human, not Nephilim. Lily had studied angels all of her life and her powers come from Enochian magic. Lily's studies had allowed her to summon Ishim, who taught her all the secrets of angels but became obsessed with her. Lily had married Akobel for protection and Ishim murdered Akobel and her daughter in revenge. Believing Lily's story, Dean heads off to confront Ishim, followed soon after by Lily and Sam. Dean and Castiel confront Ishim, who eventually confirms Lily's story and battles them. After Ishim defeats the humans, Castiel kills him to save Lily, who is unsure whether or not she will give up on revenge since it is all she has had for over a hundred years. Castiel apologizes for his role in the death of Akobel and May and offers that if she leaves and finds that she can't forgive him, he will be waiting for her to take her chance. Lily ultimately departs after thanking Castiel. Later, the Winchesters and Castiel discuss the troubling implications of Lucifer's child and Castiel breaking the deal with Billie.
252	11	"Regarding Dean"	John Badham	Meredith Glynn	February 9, 2017	T13.19961	1.73
In Eureka Springs, Arkansas, Dean chases a severely wounded man through the woods. The man hits Dean with a spell, and the next morning Dean can't remember anything of the night before. After meeting up with Sam, Dean learns that they were investigating the murder of an accountant who died from having his stomach stuffed full of money. When Dean shows worsening memory loss, Sam contacts Rowena for help and is advised to kill the witch that cast the spell affecting Dean. Retracing Dean's steps, the two find the witch dead, but the spell still affecting Dean. Rowena recognizes the spell as the work of the Loughlin family, a powerful family of druidic witches long thought wiped-out. Rowena tells Sam that they must get the family's spellbook, the Black Grimoire to break the curse before it kills Dean. Sam tracks down Catriona and Boyd, the last two Loughlins, but is captured for a ritual to resurrect Gideon, the witch Dean killed. Rowena confronts Catriona while Sam attempts to break free. Before Catriona can kill Rowena, an amnesiac Dean follows instructions left behind by Rowena that allows him to arm himself with witch-killing bullets and kill Catriona and Boyd. Rowena is then able to use the Black Grimoire to break the curse on Dean restoring his memory from before he was cursed, though Dean can't remember any of the time during. The Winchesters promise they owe Rowena one, but take the Black Grimoire rather than letting her have it. While Dean admits that having a blank slate was nice, he prefers the life he has. The episode closes with a montage of the time Dean forgot over him riding a mechanical bull.
253	12	"Stuck in the Middle (With You)"	Richard Speight Jr.	Davy Perez	February 16, 2017	T13.19962	1.81
This episode serves as a homage to films Reservoir Dogs and Pulp Fiction. The Winchesters, Mary, Castiel and another hunter named Wally lay an ambush for a demon, during which Mary steals an unknown object from him. The demon proves invulnerable to all of their attacks, has yellow eyes like their old foe Azazel, and mortally wounds Castiel with a lance. After another demon kills Wally, the Winchesters escape; Crowley appears and warns them that the demon is Ramiel, one of the four Princes of Hell along with Azazel, Asmodeus, and Dagon, the latter of whom is interested in Lucifer's child. After the defeat of Lucifer in Season 5, Crowley had attempted to give Ramiel the crown of Hell, but Ramiel told him that the Princes had no interest in Hell any more and simply wanted to be left alone, prompting Crowley to become King instead. Before leaving, Crowley gave Ramiel the Lance of Michael and the object that Mary stole in the present. Crowley realizes that the Lance of Michael is what was used against Castiel and warns that he will die slowly with no cure. Ramiel arrives and demands what was stolen from him and attacks when they refuse. After a battle, Sam kills Ramiel with the Lance of Michael, and Crowley realizes that breaking the Lance will stop its effects on Castiel just in time to save his life. Afterwards, Mary confronts Ketch about sending her after a Prince of Hell, but eventually hands over the object she stole: the Colt. The ending also reveals that Lucifer is being held as Crowley's prisoner in a small cage in his palace.
254	13	"Family Feud"	P. J. Pesce	Brad Buckner & Eugenie Ross-Leming	February 23, 2017	T13.19963	1.62
Crowley explains to Lucifer that when Lucifer was exorcised out of the President, Crowley perverted the spell so Lucifer was sent into the repaired and improved body of his old vessel Nick instead of to the Cage. Crowley has bound Lucifer with chains based on the Cage, but Lucifer is amused and informs Crowley of the survival of his child. Meanwhile, Mary works with Arthur Ketch of the British Men of Letters who suggests she distance herself from her sons as she is at her best on her own. Sam and Dean begin investigating a series of murders committed by a vengeful spirit and realize the ghost came from the ship of Gavin MacLeod, Crowley's son who was time-displaced to the present by Abaddon. Gavin realizes that the ghost is that of his fiancée Fiona who smuggled herself aboard the ship and endured rape from the crew before the ship sank off the coast of New England. To save Fiona and her victims, Gavin decides to return to his own time to die when the ship sinks but in doing so stop Fiona from going through her terrible ordeal. After sending Gavin back with the help of Rowena, the Winchesters find no signs of Fiona's kills. They are then visited by Mary who admits the truth about working with the British Men of Letters and attempts to convince her sons to work with them. Rowena is confronted by Crowley for helping to send his son back to possibly die and she admits it was revenge for forcing her to murder Oskar to remove the Mark of Cain in "Brother's Keeper." At the same time, Kelly Kline is attacked by two angels but is saved by the Prince of Hell, Dagon. Dagon offers to protect Kelly and her unborn son, which Lucifer detects and is pleased with.
255	14	"The Raid"	John MacCarthy	Robert Berens	March 2, 2017	T13.19964	1.63
As the British Men of Letters work to wipe out all of the vampires in America, Mary brings Sam to see their operation while Dean is furious at her actions. As Sam is gone, Dean is visited by Ketch who compares the two of them and takes Dean on a vampire hunt. At the nest, they find the vampires gone except for one who tells them that the vampires are going after the hunters. At the British Men of Letters compound, a group of vampires, led by the Alpha Vampire, attack and kill most of the Men of Letters staff. Sam arms himself with the Colt and faces off with the Alpha Vampire, eventually killing the Alpha with a head shot, assisted by his mother and Mick Davies. After the battle, Sam decides to join the British operation, saying that despite everything that went wrong, the death of the Alpha Vampire proves the good the operation can do. Sam secretly promises to work on winning his brother over, while Dean forgives Mary even though he disagrees with her.
256	15	"Somewhere Between Heaven and Hell"	Nina Lopez-Corrado	Davy Perez	March 9, 2017	T13.19965	1.49
Sam has spent two weeks sending himself and Dean on cases secretly supplied by Mick Davies. In Nebraska, a man named Marcus is killed by a hellhound while his girlfriend Gwen wounds it. The hellhound goes after her next, despite neither of them having sold their souls. The Winchesters call Crowley who reveals this hellhound is Ramsey, one of the first, loyal to only Lucifer. Ramsey attacks Sam and Gwen in the Impala, though Sam is able to kill her, begrudgingly thanking Crowley for his help. Sam confesses to Dean he is working with the British Men of Letters, and Dean agrees to give them a chance. Two of Crowley's demons had freed Ramsey as a distraction to free Lucifer. Lucifer tries to take power but Crowley reveals that he warded the body of Lucifer's vessel Nick with the true spells from the Cage, making Lucifer his slave. Meanwhile, Castiel realizes Kelly has been taken by Dagon. Castiel is told he can return to Heaven if he helps find the Nephilim, and is afterwards seen on his way to meet the angels' new leader, Joshua.
257	16	"Ladies Drink Free"	Amyn Kaderali	Meredith Glynn	March 30, 2017	T13.19966	1.71
After a werewolf attack that leaves a young man dead and his sister Hayden seriously injured, the Winchesters set out to investigate, accompanied by Mick Davies of the British Men of Letters who wishes to get field experience. The Winchesters learn that Claire Novak is also investigating, hunting on her own and lying to Jody Mills about it. While investigating the attack, Mick discovers that Hayden has been bitten, and he returns that night to kill her per British Men of Letters protocol. His actions draw the anger of the Winchesters when they realize what he's done. Shortly afterwards, Claire is bitten by the same werewolf, and the Winchesters realize the only chance to save her is an experimental cure created by Mick's organization that requires the blood of the werewolf that bit Claire. As the Winchesters search for the culprit, Claire and Mick are attacked by the werewolf who is revealed to be a young local bartender, Justin. After kidnapping Claire, Justin explains that he was part of a peaceful pack before they were wiped out by the British Men of Letters. Due to a werewolf's pack mentality, Justin is now desperately seeking companionship, which is his motive in turning Claire and Hayden. The Winchesters and Mick track down Justin and attack, killing him and getting his blood. Using Justin's blood, Mick is able to cure Claire. The next morning, Claire leaves a voicemail for Jody, finally telling her the truth and accepting Jody as her family, but also still planning to hunt on her own for the time being. The Winchesters also choose to give Mick a second chance, with the hunt changing Mick's view of the world of monsters as black and white.
258	17	"The British Invasion"	John F. Showalter	Eugenie Ross-Leming & Brad Buckner	April 6, 2017	T13.19967	1.57
Flashbacks reveal a young Mick was forced to kill his best friend at Kendricks Academy as per the Code of the British Men of Letters. Having become aware of the Nephilim, his old teacher Dr. Hess demands he get the Winchesters in line or give them to Ketch to be killed, sending her protege Renny to watch things. The Winchesters have their hunter friend Eileen (from Season 11's Into the Mystic) get a lead on Kelly Kline and Dagon. With no word from Castiel, Mick brings The Colt as the hunters and Men of Letters trick Kelly into a meeting to talk, but Dagon shows up. Eileen fires The Colt at Dagon but misses and kills Renny by accident. Mick almost kills her as is The Code, but the Winchesters talk him out of it and he lets them go. Ketch sleeps with Mary but she says it doesn't mean anything and she's still loyal to her family. Dr. Hess shows up in America saying Eileen will be killed. Mick stands up for the Winchesters' way so Ketch kills him, and Dr. Hess tells Ketch to execute all the American hunters. Eileen plans to return to Ireland after killing a human, and the Winchesters have The Colt back. Meanwhile, Lucifer acts submissive to Crowley while secretly gaining support from the demons who look for a way to break the warding on Nick's vessel. Dagon informs Kelly that birthing her Nephilim son will kill her.
259	18	"The Memory Remains"	Phil Sgriccia	John Bring	April 13, 2017	T13.19968	1.58
The Winchesters receive an email from Ketch posing as Mick Davies sending them on a case in Tomahawk, Wisconsin. While they are gone, Ketch leads a team that checks out the Bunker and leaves spy equipment behind to watch the Winchesters. The Winchesters discover that every year from 1898 to 1997, someone disappeared in Tomahawk and suspect a satyr due to a witness description of the monster. After the witness disappears, the Winchesters suspect the local sheriff, Barrett Bishop whose family owned the town until he recently sold most everything. Confronting Barrett, the Winchesters learn that his family got their riches by sacrificing people to the god Moloch. After Barrett's father died in 1997, Barrett put an end to it and left Moloch to starve to death, as he had no desire to harm anyone. However, Moloch was rediscovered recently by Barrett's half-brother Pete who was promised riches in exchange for feeding Moloch. After Pete kidnaps Dean and tries to feed him to Moloch, Sam kills Pete and then Moloch with a shot from the Colt. Afterwards, the Winchesters ponder their legacy on the world and carve their initials in the library table at the Bunker. The two are informed by Ketch that they will now report to him, unaware that he is spying on them in secret.
260	19	"The Future"	Amanda Tapping	Robert Berens & Meredith Glynn	April 27, 2017	T13.19969	1.38
After learning of the destruction her child will wreak if he is born, Kelly commits suicide only to be resurrected by her son. Following her resurrection, Kelly insists that she sensed her child's soul and he is not evil as everyone believes. At the same time, Castiel visits the Bunker after having been missing for weeks and explains he was in Heaven working with the angels but left when they had no luck. While Castiel was away, Sam has come up with a plan to strip the child of his powers and leave him human. However, Castiel is actually still working with the angels and steals the Colt to kill Dagon and Kelly and relieve the Winchesters of the burden of spilling innocent blood. Working with Kelvin and another angel, Castiel tracks Kelly through the surge of power emitted by her resurrection, but cannot bring himself to kill her and flees with her instead, while Dagon captures Kelvin and kills the other angel. Upon the prompting of an enraged Lucifer, Dagon tortures Kelvin for information on Castiel's plan before killing him. On the orders of Joshua, Castiel decides to take Kelly through the portal to Heaven which will kill both Kelly and her child. While resting, Kelly reiterates her belief to Castiel that the child is good and the child chooses Castiel as his protector, receiving a premonition of a fight between Castiel and Dagon. At the Heavenly portal, Castiel and Kelly are greeted by Joshua, only to have Dagon appear and kill Joshua. Aided by the Winchesters, Castiel battles Dagon to no avail, leading to the destruction of the Colt. As all seems lost, Kelly's son grants Castiel the power to incinerate Dagon through Kelly's hand. Castiel tells the Winchesters that he now knows that the child must be born with his powers intact and departs with Kelly to help her give birth somewhere safe, telling her that the child has shown him "the future."
261	20	"Twigs & Twine & Tasha Banes"	Richard Speight Jr.	Steve Yockey	May 4, 2017	T13.19970	1.51
In Rock River, Wyoming, the witch Tasha Banes checks into a hotel, hunting for another witch who has been killing people, but she is stabbed in the cellar. Her children Alicia and Max Banes follow, though Max doesn't think anything is wrong. Alicia calls Mary's cell phone, which is answered by Sam and Dean, who join them. They investigate at Tasha's hotel, where they see a man emerge from the cellar, and they find Tasha apparently safe in her room. Sam discovers that the man from the cellar went missing months ago. Investigating the cellar they find the bodies of the real Tasha, the hotel clerk and the man from earlier, with their hearts ripped out, devastating Max. Max uses his magic to reveal the woman at the hotel is the witch whose power comes from a demon deal. She creates perfect replica dolls of her victims using the hearts. Wanting someone else to take her power so she can avoid going to hell, she offers Max the doll of his mother, while Sam and Alicia are attacked by it. Dean kills the witch before Max can agree, but the Tasha doll kills Alicia. After the Winchesters leave, Max uses the spell-book to make an unknowing doll of Alicia and burns her real body. Meanwhile, Mary grows suspicious of Ketch, discovering Mick's body as well as files on all three Winchesters, Claire, Eileen and Garth. Mary warns her sons but is captured, to be interrogated by Lady Toni Bevell.
262	21	"There's Something About Mary"	P. J. Pesce	Brad Buckner & Eugenie Ross-Leming	May 11, 2017	T13.19971	1.42
Ketch uses a hellhound to kill Eileen in South Carolina. Lady Toni Bevell has been drugging and brainwashing Mary, forcing her to kill a hunter friend. Mary tries to commit suicide and begs Ketch to kill her but he claims her struggle will be over soon. Dr. Hess is revealed to be working with Crowley in the UK and continuing their arrangement in the U.S. as he gave her the hellhound. When Sam and Dean learn of Eileen's death along with several other hunters, they discover she sent them a postal message fearing the British Men of Letters were tracking her. Searching the bunker they find the listening device and set a trap, capturing Toni. Toni mocks them and Mary's sexual relationship with Ketch, also revealing they are behind the deaths including Mick's. Returning to the bunker, Ketch is there with mercenaries. Sam and Dean kill the men, but a brainwashed Mary frees Ketch. Ketch seals them in the bunker to suffocate to death, along with Toni so Dr. Hess will let him lead the American operation permanently; departing with an enthralled Mary. Meanwhile, Crowley tries to get Lucifer to reveal his son's location since Dagon is dead and he believes Castiel will want the child dead. Lucifer learns the warding that binds his vessel to Crowley can work both ways and takes control, stabbing Crowley. Now free, Lucifer prepares to find his son.
263	22	"Who We Are"	John F. Showalter	Robert Berens	May 18, 2017	T13.19972	1.75
Mary continues her mission of killing the American hunters, eventually going after Jody Mills. However, with the help of her adopted daughter Alex, Jody subdues Mary. At the same time, the Winchesters and Lady Toni Bevell remain locked in the bunker and spend two days trying to find a way out without success. Almost out of air, Dean is able to use a grenade launcher to blast through a wall into the sewers and escape to hit the bunker's manual override. Alerted by Jody about Mary's capture, the Winchesters and Toni travel to Sioux Falls, South Dakota, where Toni reveals she cannot reverse what she has done to Mary. Instead, Dean has Toni help him enter Mary's mind where he finds her trapped in a memory of 1983. Dean rants at Mary about how he hates her for ruining his life then forgives her, breaking Mary's brainwashing. At the same time, Sam leads an army of hunters in a raid against the British compound. Despite suffering casualties, the American hunters defeat the British Men of Letters and destroy their compound. Before being killed by Jody, Doctor Hess reveals Lucifer's escape. After reaching Mary, Dean awakens to find Ketch has killed Toni. The two engage in a fight that ends when Mary awakens and kills Ketch. After Sam returns, the Winchesters finally reconcile as a family.
264	23	"All Along the Watchtower"	Robert Singer	Andrew Dabb	May 18, 2017	T13.19973	1.65
With the birth of Lucifer's son approaching, the Winchesters and Crowley, who survived Lucifer's attempt on his life, search for biblical omens pointing towards the Nephilim's birth. Lucifer kills Rowena so he cannot be sent back to the Cage. At the same time, while taking care of Kelly, Castiel discovers that the baby's power has opened a rift into an alternate post-apocalyptic reality resulting from the Winchesters having never been born. Upon his return, Castiel hides his discovery from Kelly. The Winchesters are eventually able to locate Castiel and Kelly. While Mary tends to Kelly, who has gone into labor, Castiel takes Sam and Dean through the rift where they are greeted by an alternate Bobby Singer. Bobby is able to supply the Winchesters with a machine gun capable of killing angels to use against Lucifer, while Crowley offers a way to seal Lucifer in the alternate reality. As Dean distracts Lucifer, Sam and Crowley perform a spell to seal the rift, a spell Crowley sacrifices his own life to complete. However, Lucifer is able to follow them back through the rift before it can close and kills Castiel. Mary manages to send Lucifer back to the alternate reality, but he drags her there with him, leaving both trapped as the rift closes. While Dean mourns Castiel's death, Sam discovers that Kelly has died in childbirth and finds her son, newborn but having the appearance of a teenager.

== Production ==
Supernatural was renewed for a twelfth season by The CW on March 11, 2016. The twelfth season is the final season to feature Mark A. Sheppard as Crowley as the actor announced in May 2017 he would not be returning for season 13.

== Reception ==
The review aggregator website Rotten Tomatoes currently reports a 100% approval rating for Supernatural's twelfth season, with an average rating of 8.5/10 based on 10 reviews. The critics consensus reads, "Twelve seasons in, Supernatural still finds ways to entertain, forging new paths bound to lead to fresh adventures ahead for the Winchester brothers."

=== Ratings ===
Viewership and ratings per episode of Supernatural season 12
No.	Title	Air date	Rating/share (18–49)	Viewers (millions)	DVR (18–49)	DVR viewers (millions)	Total (18–49)	Total viewers (millions)
1	"Keep Calm and Carry On"	October 13, 2016	0.8/3	2.15	0.6	—N/a	1.4	—N/a
2	"Mamma Mia"	October 20, 2016	0.6/2	1.61	0.6	1.09	1.2	2.71
3	"The Foundry"	October 27, 2016	0.6/2	1.68	0.4	0.96	1.0	2.64
4	"American Nightmare"	November 3, 2016	0.7/2	1.81	0.5	1.04	1.2	2.84
5	"The One You've Been Waiting For"	November 10, 2016	0.6/2	1.70	0.5	1.06	1.1	2.76
6	"Celebrating the Life of Asa Fox"	November 17, 2016	0.7/3	1.80	0.5	1.05	1.2	2.85
7	"Rock Never Dies"	December 1, 2016	0.6/2	1.80	0.6	1.15	1.2	2.95
8	"LOTUS"	December 8, 2016	0.6/2	1.73	0.5	1.07	1.1	2.80
9	"First Blood"	January 26, 2017	0.6/2	1.72	0.5	1.01	1.1	2.73
10	"Lily Sunder Has Some Regrets"	February 2, 2017	0.6/2	1.73	0.4	0.91	1.0	2.64
11	"Regarding Dean"	February 9, 2017	0.6/2	1.73	—N/a	—N/a	—N/a	—N/a
12	"Stuck in the Middle (With You)"	February 16, 2017	0.7/3	1.81	—N/a	0.96	—N/a	2.77
13	"Family Feud"	February 23, 2017	0.6/2	1.62	—N/a	0.96	—N/a	2.58
14	"The Raid"	March 2, 2017	0.6/2	1.63	—N/a	—N/a	—N/a	—N/a
15	"Somewhere Between Heaven and Hell"	March 9, 2017	0.5/2	1.49	0.4	0.78	0.8	2.29
16	"Ladies Drink Free"	March 30, 2017	0.6/2	1.71	—N/a	—N/a	—N/a	TBD
17	"The British Invasion"	April 6, 2017	0.5/2	1.57	0.4	0.91	0.9	2.48
18	"The Memory Remains"	April 13, 2017	0.5/2	1.58	0.4	0.82	0.9	2.38
19	"The Future"	April 27, 2017	0.5/2	1.38	—N/a	—N/a	—N/a	—N/a
20	"Twigs & Twine & Tasha Banes"	May 4, 2017	0.5/2	1.51	0.3	0.80	0.8	2.31
21	"There's Something About Mary"	May 11, 2017	0.5/2	1.42	0.4	0.85	0.9	2.27
22	"Who We Are"	May 18, 2017	0.6/3	1.75	0.4	0.90	1.0	2.60
23	"All Along the Watchtower"	May 18, 2017	0.6/2	1.65	0.4	0.90	1.0	2.60
