= Mamma Mia (Supernatural) =

- Supernatural episode
- Episode no.: Season 12; Episode 2
- Directed by: Thomas J. Wright
- Written by: Brad Buckner; Eugenie Ross-Leming
- Cinematography by: Serge Ladouceur
- Editing by: James Pickel
- Production code: T13.19952
- Original air date: October 20, 2016
- Running time: 42 minutes

Guest appearances
- Rick Springfield as Vince Vincente/Lucifer (special guest star); Ruth Connell as Rowena; Samantha Smith as Mary Winchester; Elizabeth Blackmore as Lady Antonia "Toni" Bevell; Bronagh Waugh as Ms. Watt; Woody Jeffreys as Tommy; Adam Fergus as Mick Davies

Episode chronology
← Previous "Keep Calm and Carry On"	Next → "The Foundry"
- Supernatural season 12

"Mamma Mia" is the second episode of the paranormal drama television series Supernatural's season 12, and the 243rd overall. The episode was written by executive producers Brad Buckner & Eugenie Ross-Leming and directed by Thomas J. Wright. It was first broadcast on October 20, 2016, on The CW. In the episode, Dean, Mary and Castiel are getting closer to Sam's location. Sam, meanwhile, is continued to being tortured by Toni, looking for information on the American hunters. Meanwhile, Crowley has finally found Lucifer, who is now in a new vessel: a faded rock star named Vince Vincente and sets off with Rowena to send him back to the Cage. The episode marked the debut of Rick Springfield on the recurring role of Lucifer's vessel.

The episode received positive reviews, with critics praising the character development and Rick Springfield's performance.

== Plot ==
Sam's (Jared Padalecki) new hallucination has him having sex with Toni (Elizabeth Blackmore) as a way to know the names. He finally finds about the hallucination and wakes up, realizing it was just a potion given to him and that they also need to talk about Ruby, surprising Sam. She receives a call from Mick (Adam Fergus), a fellow Man of Letters, who chastises her for disobeying orders and also tells her about Ms. Watt's (Bronagh Waugh) death.

Dean (Jensen Ackles) is informed by Castiel (Misha Collins) that he may have found Sam a warded farmhouse after searching rental properties in Aldrich, Missouri, the location Ms. Watt's cell phone had pointed to. Dean decides to go but asks Mary (Samantha Smith) to stay out in order to protect her. Crowley (Mark A. Sheppard) has discovered Rowena (Ruth Connell), who is trying to live a normal life out of witchcraft. He finally convinces her for help in using her magic and the Book of the Damned to find Lucifer and lock him again in the Cage by threatening to kill her date.

Meanwhile, Vince Vincente (Rick Springfield) is a washed-up rock star who has been feeling depressed since the death of his girlfriend years ago. While in his hotel room, Vince is stunned to find blood instead of water in his sink. After the objects in his room fly, Vince comes face to face with his dead girlfriend, who is in fact Lucifer disguised, tricking him to say "yes" to be his new vessel. Believing that he will be with his dead lover, Vince gives his consent and Lucifer gains a new vessel. Dean goes inside the farmhouse but he falls on a trap and is captured by Toni, who is planning on using him as a method of torture for Sam's punishment and a way for him to talk.

Lucifer meets with Crowley to talk about their new positions. Crowley wants to continue ruling as King of Hell and tells him that he can better reign Heaven. Lucifer refuses and prepares to kill him when Rowena approaches with a spell and Crowley pours sulphuric acid on him in hopes this will make Vince expel him and they can return him to the Cage. However, the spell loses its hold and Lucifer regains power, causing Crowley to flee and takes Rowena as a prisoner. Toni begins to torture Dean as well as bringing the topic of Benny. Mary arrives and holds her at gunpoint. However, a fight ensues while Dean frees himself. Toni casts a spell to strangle Mary to force Dean's surrender, but Dean recognizes the spell and knocks Toni unconscious, saving Mary.

After Toni is knocked out, her associate Mick arrives with Castiel. Mick explains that the British Men of Letters are interested in working with the American branch to keep the country safe and that Toni just went too far and will be punished for her actions. While the Americans are skeptical, Mick has disarmed himself and lowered the wards so Castiel could enter as a sign of good faith to show that he means no harm. Mick gives them his phone number and departs with Toni.

That night, Sam talks with Mary, happy that she's back and gives her John's journal to help her understand what's happened since she died. Lucifer reveals to Rowena that he will not kill her, but use her and the Book of the Damned as a weapon and they depart Crowley's lair. While on the way to the airport, Mick chastises Toni for her actions, stating that she was supposed to make them trust the British. Toni refuses to admit she did anything wrong since Sam and Dean are too dangerous; Mick has already sent for their torturer, Mr. Ketch, just in case. The episode ends as Mr. Ketch leaves his room in London to depart for America.

== Reception ==
=== Viewers ===
The episode was watched by 1.61 million viewers with a 0.6/2 share among adults aged 18 to 49. This was a 26% decrease in viewership from the previous episode, which was watched by 2.15 million viewers with a 0.8/3 in the 18-49 demographics. This means that 0.6 percent of all households with televisions watched the episode, while 2 percent of all households watching television at that time watched it. Supernatural ranked as the second most watched program on The CW in the day, behind Legends of Tomorrow.

=== Critical reviews ===
Professional ratings
Review scores
Source	Rating
TV Fanatic	3.9/5 stars
Den of Geek	3.5/5 stars

"Mamma Mia" received positive reviews. Sean McKenna from TV Fanatic, gave a 3.9 star rating out of 5, stating: "This was a decent follow-up to the season premiere. Things may not be barreling full steam ahead yet, and I'm still waiting to get excited by the British Men of Letters, but there's something about not knowing fully what's in store that's keeping me engaged. I'm intrigued enough to want to keep going on this latest road."

Bridget LaMonica from Den of Geek, gave a 3.5 star rating out of 5, stating: "The espionage angle with the British Men of Letters is interesting, but I need to see more of where it's going before it feels like it fits with the side story of Lucifer getting a new vessel. Supernatural isn't much for globe-hopping, James Bond action – although we did have a moment once when Dean proudly declared himself Batman after a rabbits foot-induced lucky shot."

Hunter Bishop of TV Overmind gave the episode a 4.3 star rating out of 5 and wrote, "I am interested, if a little put off, by the British Men of Letters storyline. Them as a force for evil (and make no mistake, that is what the plane on perpetrating) and as ruthless killing machines comes off as somehow flat. Is that really all they are? Just highly efficient killers of man and monster? I'm not saying it isn't interesting, because it certainly is; just that I don't want a great potential villain (and anti-hero) ruined because they can only play a single note. There has a been a lot of depth in these first two episodes and, it would be very disappointing for the A plot to be anchored by one long trumpet blast."

Samantha Highfill of EW gave the episode a "B−" and wrote, "Altogether, it wasn't a remarkable hour, but it was filled with a lot of necessary story in order to set up the season. Now that the Winchesters are back together and Lucifer has a new vessel, I'm excited to see where we go from here."
