= American Nightmare =

American Nightmare may refer to:

== People with the nickname ==
- Cody Rhodes (b. 1985), an American professional wrestler
- Goldust (b. 1969), an American professional wrestler

== Entertainment ==
=== Television ===
- American Nightmare (TV series), a 2024 Netflix documentary
- "American Nightmare" (Supernatural), a television episode
- American Nightmare, a 2019 6-part documentary aired on Investigation Discovery

=== Movies ===
- The American Nightmare (2000 film), a documentary about horror films
- American Nightmare (film), a 1983 Canadian horror film
- American Nightmare (2002 film), by Jon Keeyes

=== Music ===
- American Nightmare (band), former name of Give Up the Ghost, an American hardcore punk band
- "American Nightmare", a song by Misfits from Legacy of Brutality
- "The American Nightmare", a song by Ice Nine Kills from their 2018 album The Silver Scream

=== Other media ===
- Alan Wake's American Nightmare, a 2012 video game
- The Stand: American Nightmares, a comic book

== See also ==
- Going Rouge: Sarah Palin, An American Nightmare, a collection of essays
- All American Nightmare, an album by Hinder
- "The Great American Nightmare", a song by Rob Zombie
- American Dream
