= First Blood (Supernatural) =

- Supernatural episode
- Episode no.: Season 12; Episode 9
- Directed by: Robert Singer
- Written by: Andrew Dabb
- Cinematography by: Serge Ladouceur
- Editing by: John Fitzpatrick
- Production code: T13.19959
- Original air date: January 26, 2017
- Running time: 42 minutes

Guest appearances
- Samantha Smith as Mary Winchester; Lisa Berry as Billie the Reaper; Adam Fergus as Mick Davies; David Haydn-Jones as Arthur Ketch; Kara Royster as Alicia Banes; Stephen Lobo as Rick Sanchez; Norman Browning as Camp; Donovan Stinson as Wally

Episode chronology
← Previous "LOTUS"	Next → "Lily Sunder Has Some Regrets"
- Supernatural season 12

"First Blood" is the ninth episode and midseason premiere of the paranormal drama television series Supernatural's season 12, and the 250th overall. The episode was written by showrunner Andrew Dabb and directed by executive producer Robert Singer. It was first broadcast on January 26, 2017, on The CW. In the episode, Sam and Dean are placed on a black site after "attempting to assassinate" the President and begin to look for a way to get out of their jails. Meanwhile, Mary and Castiel work together in order to save them from the government.

The episode received generally positive reviews although critics wondered what would be the direction of the season.

== Plot ==
Sam (Jared Padalecki) and Dean (Jensen Ackles) are taken to a government black site in the Rocky Mountain National Park, where they are locked in separate cells until they are willing to talk. After nearly two months, they are found dead by the guards, but suddenly revive and escape. At the same time, Mary (Samantha Smith) and Castiel (Misha Collins) attempt to find them without luck. With the Winchesters gone, monster activity goes on the rise and Castiel begins to see just how important his friends are. After escaping, the Winchesters contact Castiel to meet them when they get out of the forest and go on the run from government soldiers. Sam and Dean are able to defeat the soldiers, then reunite with Castiel and Mary, who have found them with the help of Mick (Adam Fergus) and Arthur (David Haydn-Jones). Driving away, they are stopped by Billie (Lisa Berry) and it is revealed that the Winchesters made a deal with her in which they would temporarily die and come back in exchange for a Winchester dying permanently at midnight or face cosmic consequences. Mary chooses to sacrifice herself for her sons, but Castiel kills Billie instead, telling the horrified Winchesters that they are all too important for the world to lose. At the same time, Mick unsuccessfully attempts to make connections with the American hunters. However, when Mick approaches Mary, she is shown to be more open to listening since he helped rescue Sam and Dean, though she is unaware that Mick had Arthur kill everyone at the black site so as to leave no "loose ends".

== Reception ==
=== Viewers ===
The episode was watched by 1.72 million viewers with a 0.6/2 share among adults aged 18 to 49. This was a slight decrease in viewership from the previous episode, which was watched by 1.73 million viewers with a 0.6/2 in the 18-49 demographics. This means that 0.6 percent of all households with televisions watched the episode, while 2 percent of all households watching television at that time watched it. Supernatural ranked as the most watched program on The CW in the day, beating Riverdale.

=== Critical reviews ===
"First Blood" received generally positive reviews. Matt Fowler of IGN gave the episode a "good" 7.3 out of 10 and wrote in his verdict: "With 'First Blood,' the show sort of decided that Sam and Dean were finally in a bind that Cas, Mary, and Crowley couldn't touch. Not that Crowley would, but specifically, and conveniently, his contacts were useless here. So the boys got to sit alone for over a month and then decide that that was so bad that one of them should die. What worked here was the idea of Sam and Dean's criminal past finally catching up with them. Their reputations as Heartland boogeymen put them in a tough spot. The problem was, it never felt quite tough enough given everything else these guys have faced over twelve seasons."

Sean McKenna from TV Fanatic, gave a 3 star rating out of 5, stating: "I was expecting a lot more from this episode, especially for a midseason premiere. I'm interested to see how things play out going forward with respect to killing Billie, but it felt like such a roundabout and unnecessary way to get there with the whole prison and then escape. If anything, at least Sam and Dean are back and ready to get into the next case. After all, they're the guys who saved the world."

Samantha Highfill from EW gave the episode an "A−" and wrote, "Altogether, this hour was once again something different for the show. The way the action unfolded felt more like a mini action movie than an episode of Supernatural, and it worked. Yes, we're used to seeing the Winchesters fight on this show, but this time, they weren't facing ghosts. They were facing real, trained soldiers. They're always badass, but this was a new level. And once again, I'm amazed at the versatility of the Winchester story."
