= The Foundry (Supernatural) =

- Supernatural episode
- Episode no.: Season 12; Episode 3
- Directed by: Robert Singer
- Written by: Robert Berens
- Cinematography by: Serge Ladouceur
- Editing by: John Fitzpatrick
- Production code: T13.19953
- Original air date: October 27, 2016
- Running time: 42 minutes

Guest appearances
- Rick Springfield as Vince Vincente/Lucifer (special guest star); Ruth Connell as Rowena; Samantha Smith as Mary Winchester; Woody Jeffreys as Tommy

Episode chronology
← Previous "Mamma Mia"	Next → "American Nightmare"
- Supernatural season 12

"The Foundry" is the third episode of the paranormal drama television series Supernatural's season 12, and the 244th overall. The episode was written by supervising producer Robert Berens and directed by executive producer Robert Singer. It was first broadcast on October 27, 2016, on The CW. In the episode, Sam, Dean and Mary Winchester investigate a case where a couple were killed when they heard a baby crying in a house. They soon realize that there are ghosts in the house from the spirits of the dead kids but the spirit of the father of one of the kids possesses Mary. Meanwhile, Castiel is forced to team up with Crowley to find Lucifer, who wants Rowena to help him make him stronger.

The episode received positive reviews, with critics praising the Castiel and Crowley's storyline.

== Plot ==
In Minnesota, a couple is found in an abandoned house frostbitten to death after hearing a crying baby inside. Mary (Samantha Smith) insists they take the case, surprising Sam (Jared Padalecki) who worries she is burying her emotions. At the house Mary is grabbed by a ghost child but doesn't think he was trying to hurt her. Sam and Dean (Jensen Ackles) learn several children have died in that house and leave to burn the bones. Mary calls the last owner of that house and investigates it herself, the children's ghosts are still there. The father of the first girl who died, killed himself in the house and his ghost has been killing kids and keeping their spirits there ever since.

He possesses Mary and attacks Dean, though Sam burns his bones; saving them and releasing the children's spirits. Mary admits she is mourning John and the little boys she used to have; leaving the bunker to be alone. Meanwhile, Castiel (Misha Collins) reluctantly teams up with Crowley (Mark A. Sheppard) to find Lucifer (Rick Springfield) who healed the legs of Vince's sister. Lucifer demands Rowena (Ruth Connell) make his vessel stronger, she tricks him as her spell decays the body and sends him to the bottom of the ocean. She agrees to work with Castiel and Crowley the next time they corner Lucifer.

== Reception ==
=== Viewers ===
The episode was watched by 1.68 million viewers with a 0.6/2 share among adults aged 18 to 49. This was a 4% increase in viewership from the previous episode, which was watched by 1.61 million viewers with a 0.6/2 in the 18-49 demographics. This means that 0.6 percent of all households with televisions watched the episode, while 2 percent of all households watching television at that time watched it. Supernatural ranked as the second most watched program on The CW in the day, behind Legends of Tomorrow.

=== Critical reviews ===
Professional ratings
Review scores
Source	Rating
TV Fanatic	4.3/5 stars
Den of Geek	4/5 stars

"The Foundry" received positive reviews. Sean McKenna from TV Fanatic, gave a 4.3 star rating out of 5, stating: "'The Foundry' really felt like a step up, especially in focusing on Mary’s difficulties being back alive. I am curious as to how her story will play out in the long run, but I maintain that it's been great to have her and her fresh dynamic as a part of Supernatural Season 12."

Bridget LaMonica from Den of Geek, gave a 4 star rating out of 5, stating: "This new season has been impressing so far. Hopefully we won't lose the awesomness of Mary and Lucifer prematurely."

Hunter Bishop of TV Overmind gave the episode a 3.3 star rating out of 5 and wrote, "A very solid episode of Supernatural. If this is the floor for the season, then they’re going to be in really good shape."

Samantha Highfill of EW gave the episode a "B+" and wrote, "Overall, I really enjoyed this episode. It was a nice mix of a case of the week with some deeper familial drama, and of course, you can't go wrong with the pairing of Cas and Crowley."
