= Keep Calm and Carry On (Supernatural) =

- Supernatural episode
- Episode no.: Season 12; Episode 1
- Directed by: Phil Sgriccia
- Written by: Andrew Dabb
- Cinematography by: Serge Ladouceur
- Editing by: Donald L. Koch
- Production code: T13.19951
- Original air date: October 13, 2016
- Running time: 41 minutes

Guest appearances
- Samantha Smith as Mary Winchester; Elizabeth Blackmore as Lady Antonia "Toni" Bevell; Bronagh Waugh as Ms. Watt; Colin Lawrence as Dr. Gregory Marion

Episode chronology
← Previous "Alpha and Omega"	Next → "Mamma Mia"
- Supernatural season 12

"Keep Calm and Carry On" is the first episode and season premiere of the paranormal drama television series Supernatural's season 12, and the 242nd overall. The episode was written by new showrunner Andrew Dabb and directed by executive producer Phil Sgriccia. It was first broadcast on October 13, 2016, on The CW. In the episode, Dean finds that his mom was resurrected by Amara and along with Castiel, discover that Sam has been kidnapped and set off to find him. Meanwhile, Crowley goes with him to find Lucifer, who was exiled from Castiel's vessel and is looking to find a new one.

The episode received positive reviews, with critics praising the new character development and writing of the episode although the slow pace received criticism.

== Plot ==
Dean (Jensen Ackles) finds Mary Winchester (Samantha Smith) in a field, wondering if she is real. He tries to touch her and she attacks him. He explains to her that he is her son, but she still thinks she is in 1983. Dean finally manages to tell her that she has been resurrected and tells her story so she can believe him. She finally accepts her resurrection and the fact that her sons are now older than her.

On a road, a trucker stops to see a crash near a billboard. The crash is revealed to be Castiel (Misha Collins), after he has been expelled. He causes the trucker to faint and takes his truck to go back to the bunker. Dean later explains to Mary about John's death and that he and Sam (Jared Padalecki) were raised as hunters, something which Mary had tried to avoid. Meanwhile, Toni (Elizabeth Blackmore) takes the kidnapped Sam to a veterinarian, Dr. Gregory Marion (Colin Lawrence) to stitch Sam's wound, revealing that she shot him in the leg. Marion refuses until he begins to be threatened.

Crowley (Mark A. Sheppard) is desperately trying to find Lucifer's new vessel, realizing that his demon consultants are covering Lucifer's dead bodies. Crowley follows a trail of dead bodies that are revealed to be burned out vessels Lucifer tried on. Sam is locked in a basement by Toni, who informs him that the British Men of Letters have been watching over them and want information to "help" American hunters make the States as safe as England. He refuses and they torture him with cold water, although that doesn't work. Dean and Mary arrive at the bunker to find blood and Sam gone. Castiel appears, causing Mary to hold him at gunpoint. Dean manages to talk her down and learns from Castiel that Sam was kidnapped. Using a hack on a traffic light, Dean manages to see the plates on the car that took Sam.

Turning off the water, Toni tells Sam that he's not a hero and that the British were better in their position as Men of Letters as they carefully lured and protected the country from monsters in 50 years. They hope that Sam can give them the name of hunters in order to teach their knowledge, hoping to expand them to America. Sam again refuses and continues to be tortured by Toni's assistant, Ms. Watt (Bronagh Waugh). Crowley finds his consultants and learns that they follow Lucifer as he will reward them. They tell Crowley that Hell will not follow him while Lucifer is out there; as a result, Crowley kills them both.

Seeing that the physical torture can't break Sam, Toni decides to inject a toxin on him to break his mind. Dean, Mary, and Castiel intercept Dr. Marion and force him to call Toni in order to track her location. Dean threatens her but she refuses and sends Ms. Watt to kill them. Sam begins to see images of his loved ones dying, causing him to become paranoid and break a glass in an appeared suicide attempt. Toni runs to help him but is subdued by Sam, who faked his suicide. Sam tries to escape but fails. Ms. Watt crashes into the Impala, causing Mary to fall unconscious. She fights Dean and Castiel, severely beating them. However, she is stabbed in the back and killed by Mary. They learn that the call came from Aldrich, Missouri. Mary states that she didn't want the hunter's life for Sam and Dean, but Dean explains that they have managed to save the world with their experience and set off to find Sam. Crowley finds another corpse of Lucifer and continues his quest to find him. The episode ends with Sam in his confinement room.

== Reception ==
=== Viewers ===
The episode was watched by 2.15 million viewers with a 0.8/3 share among adults aged 18 to 49, bringing the show's highest ratings since season 10. This was a 16% increase in viewership from the previous episode, which was watched by 1.84 million viewers with a 0.7/3 in the 18-49 demographics and it's also a 10% increase in viewership from the previous season premiere. This means that 0.8 percent of all households with televisions watched the episode, while 3 percent of all households watching television at that time watched it. Supernatural ranked as the most watched program on The CW in the day, beating Legends of Tomorrow.

=== Critical reviews ===
Professional ratings
Review scores
Source	Rating
IGN	7.5
TV Fanatic	3.7
Den of Geek	5/5 stars

"Keep Calm and Carry On" received positive reviews. Matt Fowler of IGN gave the episode a "great" 7.5 out of 10 and wrote in his verdict, Supernatural's Season 12 kickoff wasn't everything it could have been, and both major stories-of-the-moment are still lingering, but the return of Mary was well done. I hope that, as she comes to terms with her new life, Mary will be able to add a bit more drama to the mix than was present here in the premiere."

Sean McKenna from TV Fanatic, gave a 3.7 star rating out of 5, stating: "Ultimately, the season premiere didn't blow me away, but it does have me interested in the new journey for the Winchester brothers. It's definitely a fresh start with a new direction, and hopefully, when things really kick into gear, we'll get an excellent Supernatural Season 12."

Bridget LaMonica from Den of Geek, gave a perfect 5 star rating out of 5, stating: "Season 12 is off to a good start. I'm optimistic and intrigued. I'm digging the girl power and the traditional quips between our favorite characters and their adversaries. Let's see where we go from here."

Samantha Highfill of EW gave the episode a "B+" and wrote, "Altogether, it was a strong premiere. Anytime Dean is trying to save Sam, the drama's there, and this time around, we had mom to add another element to it. Plus, you just have to love having Cas back."

MaryAnn Sleasman of TV.com wrote, "'Keep Calm and Carry On,' was a slow starter, as far as Supernatural premieres go -- but that's okay. So often, the show has given us a premiere that ties up the strings from the previous finale far too quickly. Supernatural is very much at ease with being a serialized story, but too often, each season can feel isolated from its brethren."
