= Lily Sunder Has Some Regrets =

- Supernatural episode
- Episode no.: Season 12; Episode 10
- Directed by: Thomas J. Wright
- Written by: Steve Yockey
- Cinematography by: Serge Ladouceur
- Editing by: Donald L. Koch
- Production code: T13.19960
- Original air date: February 2, 2017
- Running time: 42 minutes

Guest appearances
- Alicia Witt as Lily Sunder; Ian Tracey as Ishim; Tiara Sorensen as Mirabel; Jessa Danielson as Castiel; Ava Sleeth as May; Nils Hognestad as Akobel; Miranda Edwards as Benjamin

Episode chronology
← Previous "First Blood"	Next → "Regarding Dean"
- Supernatural season 12

"Lily Sunder Has Some Regrets" is the tenth episode of the paranormal drama television series Supernatural's season 12, and the 251st overall. The episode was written by executive story editor Steve Yockey and directed by Thomas J. Wright. It was first broadcast on February 2, 2017, on The CW. In the episode, after an Angel is killed, Sam, Dean and Castiel investigate and discover there's a hunter that's killing angels connected to the murders of her child and husband.

The episode received mostly positive reviews, with critics praising the case of the week.

== Plot ==
An angel named Benjamin (Miranda Edwards) is murdered, drawing the attention of a flight of angels he had been a part of including Ishim, Mirabel and Castiel (Misha Collins). Sam (Jared Padalecki), Dean (Jensen Ackles), and Castiel investigate the murder, only to see Mirabel killed as well by Lily Sunder, who flees when the Winchesters intervene. Castiel and Ishim explain that in 1901, Lily had married an angel named Akobel and had a Nephilim daughter. As this was against Heaven's laws, they killed Akobel and his daughter May; now Lily wants revenge. The Winchesters track down Lily and are shocked to learn that her daughter was human, not Nephilim. Lily had studied angels all of her life and her powers come from Enochian magic. Lily's studies had allowed her to summon Ishim, who taught her all the secrets of angels but became obsessed with her. Lily had married Akobel for protection and Ishim murdered Akobel and her daughter in revenge.

Believing Lily's story, Dean heads off to confront Ishim, followed soon after by Lily and Sam. Dean and Castiel confront Ishim, who eventually confirms Lily's story and battles them. After Ishim defeats the humans, Castiel kills him to save Lily, who is unsure whether or not she will give up on revenge since it's all she's had for over a hundred years. Castiel apologizes for his role in the death of Akobel and May and offers that if she leaves and finds that she can't forgive him, he will be waiting for her to take her chance. Lily ultimately departs after thanking Castiel. Later, the Winchesters and Castiel discuss the troubling implications of Lucifer's child and Castiel breaking the deal with Billie.

== Reception ==
=== Viewers ===
The episode was watched by 1.73 million viewers with a 0.6/2 share among adults aged 18 to 49. This was a slight increase in viewership from the previous episode, which was watched by 1.72 million viewers with a 0.6/2 in the 18-49 demographics. This means that 0.6 percent of all households with televisions watched the episode, while 2 percent of all households watching television at that time watched it. Supernatural ranked as the most watched program on The CW in the day, beating Riverdale.

=== Critical reviews ===
"Lily Sunder Has Some Regrets" received mostly positive reviews. Sean McKenna from TV Fanatic, gave a 4.3 star rating out of 5, stating: "While 'Lily Sunder Has Some Regrets' had a shaky start, it was a case of the week that wound up having dramatic weight and touched on the larger issues the main characters are dealing with. It was a far more interesting and investing case than it initially let on, but thankfully, the hour finished strong."

Sara Netzley from EW gave the episode an "A" and wrote, "Whew. Whew. What a perfect blend of plot, action, callbacks to previous seasons, history-dependent emotional angst, and setup for episodes to come. (Think one of the brothers will try to master Enochian powers at the cost of his soul?) Kudos to Alicia Witt for creating a strong, tragic character in Lily, who I'd love to see turn up again."

Bridget LaMonica from Den of Geek gave the episode a perfect 5 star rating out of 5 and wrote, "Supernatural brought us an episode rife with the theme of consequences. This is especially true in regards to angels making rash decisions regarding humanity. Also: a Kill Bill like assassin! What's not to love?"
