= Celebrating the Life of Asa Fox =

- Supernatural episode
- Episode no.: Season 12; Episode 6
- Directed by: John Badham
- Written by: Steve Yockey
- Cinematography by: Serge Ladouceur
- Editing by: John Fitzpatrick
- Production code: T13.19956
- Original air date: November 17, 2016
- Running time: 42 minutes

Guest appearances
- Samantha Smith as Mary Winchester; Kim Rhodes as Jody Mills/Jael; Lisa Berry as Billie

Episode chronology
← Previous "The One You've Been Waiting For"	Next → "Rock Never Dies"
- Supernatural season 12

"Celebrating the Life of Asa Fox" is the sixth episode of the paranormal drama television series Supernatural's season 12, and the 247th overall. The episode was written by executive story editor Steve Yockey and directed by John Badham. It was first broadcast on November 17, 2016, on The CW. In the episode, Sam, Dean, Mary and Sheriff Mills go a hunter's wake when he dies but find another hunter is murdered. They soon find that they are dealing with a demon wanting revenge on the hunter after an exorcism decades ago.

The episode received positive reviews, with critics praising the plot.

== Plot ==
In 1980, Emerson, Manitoba, a young boy named Asa Fox is saved from a werewolf by Mary (Samantha Smith) and inspired by the meeting, he becomes a legendary hunter after he grows up, before being killed in 2016. Learning of Asa's death, many hunters go to his wake, including Sam (Jared Padalecki), Dean (Jensen Ackles), Mary, and Sheriff Jody Mills (Kim Rhodes), who had been in a relationship with Asa. Things are awkward between the Winchesters before one of the hunters is found murdered. They soon realize that they are dealing with * Jael, a demon who has had a grudge against Asa since Asa exorcised him in 1997. Jael locks Dean out of the house and everyone else in, but Dean is able to get in with help from the reaper Billie (Lisa Berry) in exchange for owing her one.

Jael kills another hunter before possessing Jody and revealing that he did not kill Asa as believed; rather, Asa was accidentally killed by his best friend Bucky while hunting Jael, and Bucky framed Jael to protect himself. While Jael is distracted with Bucky, the hunters manage to exorcise him from Jody. They promise to spread the true story of Asa's death, disgracing Bucky. The next morning, the three dead hunters are burned while Billie arrives to try and collect on her deal with Dean by reaping Mary, who she claims will never feel like she belongs in the world after her resurrection. Mary refuses and though she decides not to return to the Bunker yet, she agrees to go out for breakfast with her children.

== Reception ==
=== Viewers ===
The episode was watched by 1.80 million viewers with a 0.7/3 share among adults aged 18 to 49. This was a 5% increase in viewership from the previous episode, which was watched by 1.70 million viewers with a 0.6/2 in the 18-49 demographics. This means that 0.7 percent of all households with televisions watched the episode, while 3 percent of all households watching television at that time watched it. Supernatural ranked as the second most watched program on The CW in the day, behind Legends of Tomorrow.

=== Critical reviews ===
"Celebrating the Life of Asa Fox" received positive reviews. Sean McKenna from TV Fanatic, gave a 3.8 star rating out of 5, stating: "I hope we get more of Mary once she does finally return, but at least Sam and Dean both seemed to be OK with letting her have that little extra time. Still, the episode ended on a rather positive note with the Winchesters getting breakfast together. It was a nice way to close things out after all the drama involving the hunters, and there wasn't some last minute Mr. Ketch sighting."

Bridget LaMonica from Den of Geek gave the episode a perfect 5 star rating out of 5 and wrote: "Really, it's sad we didn't get to explore some of these moments some more in another episode or a larger arc. For what was basically a filler episode (I say that because of no progression on the Lucifer story arc) this was a damn good story."

Samantha Highfill from EW gave the episode a "B+" and wrote, "At this point in time, Mary might not quite be ready to return to the bunker, but she does agree to have breakfast with her boys. Baby steps, right? And bacon seems like a pretty good first step, if you ask me. Lots and lots of bacon."
