= The One You've Been Waiting For =

- Supernatural episode
- Episode no.: Season 12; Episode 5
- Directed by: Nina Lopez-Corrado
- Written by: Meredith Glynn
- Cinematography by: Serge Ladouceur
- Editing by: James Pickel
- Production code: T13.19955
- Original air date: November 10, 2016
- Running time: 42 minutes

Guest appearances
- Adam Rose as Aaron Bass; Allison Paige as Ellie Grant; Dustin Lloyd as Nick; Gil Darnell as Adolf Hitler

Episode chronology
← Previous "American Nightmare"	Next → "Celebrating the Life of Asa Fox"
- Supernatural season 12

"The One You've Been Waiting For" is the fifth episode of the paranormal drama television series Supernatural's season 12, and the 246th overall. The episode was written by co-producer Meredith Glynn and directed by Nina Lopez-Corrado. It was first broadcast on November 10, 2016, on The CW. In the episode, Sam and Dean must stop a group of neo-Nazi necromancers, who have control of a pocket watch which holds the soul of Adolf Hitler.

The episode received mixed reviews, with critics finding the episode too predictable.

== Plot ==
In Columbus, Ohio, an elderly woman attempts to buy an antique pocket watch only to be murdered along with the owner of the antique store by the Thule Society, an organization of neo-Nazi necromancers. They later begin chasing a young woman named Ellie Grant. The murders draw the attention of Sam (Jared Padalecki) and Dean (Jensen Ackles) who learn from a young Thule member named Christoph that the watch holds the soul of Adolf Hitler and the Thule intend to use Ellie to resurrect Hitler.

The Thule succeed in abducting Ellie and resurrecting Hitler in the body of the Thule leader, but Christoph aids the Winchesters in finding the Thule. Ellie and the Winchesters kill the Thule High Command and Dean kills Hitler. After burning the bodies of the Thule, Ellie finally stops running from everything while Christoph is forced on the run from what's left of the Thule Society which is left leaderless with the death of the Thule High Command.

== Reception ==
=== Viewers ===
The episode was watched by 1.70 million viewers with a 0.6/2 share among adults aged 18 to 49. This was a 7% decrease in viewership from the previous episode, which was watched by 1.81 million viewers with a 0.7/2 in the 18-49 demographics. This means that 0.6 percent of all households with televisions watched the episode, while 2 percent of all households watching television at that time watched it. Supernatural ranked as the second most watched program on The CW in the day, beating Legends of Tomorrow.

=== Critical reviews ===
Professional ratings
Review scores
Source	Rating
TV Fanatic	2.8/5 stars

"The One You've Been Waiting For" received mixed reviews. Sean McKenna from TV Fanatic, gave a 2.8 star rating out of 5, stating: "I wanted to like this particular case of the week, but it just felt like it was lacking. Yes, there was some humorous moments and some solid action, but by the time we even got to a goofy Hitler, he was killed and the case was over. Unfortunately, 'The One You've Been Waiting For' wasn't the episode I was waiting for. So, on to the next case!"

Bridget LaMonica from Den of Geek wrote: "So, I didn't love this episode. Much of it was predictable, from the moments of Ellie escaping out windows (her preferred method of travel, apparently) to the son being abandoned by his father and turning against the whole organization. Maybe if it all started later into the story, it would have felt a little more fresher in its approach, but you're still fighting the oft-used cliché of Nazis in modern times."

Samantha Highfill from EW gave the episode an "A−" and wrote, "One of the things Supernatural does best is put its own twist on history, whether that history takes us all the way back to the days of creation... or back to Nazi Germany. And in tonight's episode, it was the latter. I don't know about you guys, but I really enjoyed this episode. This show does such a good job of taking bad guys — Lucifer, Hitler — and having fun with them in a way that feels both eerily truthful and hilarious."
