= American Nightmare (Supernatural) =

- Supernatural episode
- Episode no.: Season 12; Episode 4
- Directed by: John F. Showalter
- Written by: Davy Perez
- Cinematography by: Serge Ladouceur
- Editing by: Donald L. Koch
- Production code: T13.19954
- Original air date: November 3, 2016
- Running time: 42 minutes

Guest appearances
- Paloma Kwiatkowski as Magda Peterson; Christina Carlisi as Gail Peterson; William MacDonald as Abraham Peterson; Gig Morton as Elijah Peterson; Aliza Vellani as Beth Roberts; David Haydn-Jones as Mr. Ketch

Episode chronology
← Previous "The Foundry"	Next → "The One You've Been Waiting For"
- Supernatural season 12

"American Nightmare" is the fourth episode of the paranormal drama television series Supernatural's season 12, and the 245th overall. The episode was written by story editor Davy Perez and directed by John Showalter. It was first broadcast on November 3, 2016, on The CW. In the episode, Sam and Dean investigate a family who has been living "off the grid" and is trying to hide a secret surrounding their young daughter, who may have powers.

The episode received positive reviews, with critics praising the shocking final scene.

== Plot ==
In Iowa, a woman named Olivia walks into a church bleeding and being whipped by something unseen, she dies. Sam (Jared Padalecki) and Dean (Jensen Ackles) talk to her coworker Beth (Aliza Vellani) at Child Protective Services, a Wiccan who is promoted with Olivia dead. Dean thinks it's obvious Beth killed her with a spell and is moody with Mary gone. A local grocery stock boy then dies the same way. The two victims are connected to a deeply religious husband, wife and son who live off grid while their daughter Magda (Paloma Kwiatkowski) died of pneumonia. Sam believes Magda's ghost is doing this while Dean goes to kill Beth. Sam discovers Magda is still alive in the basement and is considered the devil by her family, forced by her mother to whip herself.

Sam is captured as Dean realizes Beth is innocent. Sam learns Magda has psychic abilities and she had reached out to the two victims trying to get their help, not intending to kill them. With their secret exposed, her mother intends for them to poison themselves and die as a family, killing her husband. Magda tries to stop her and her mother accidentally kills her brother. Sam talks her out of murdering her mother who is arrested. Magda is sent to live with an aunt in California with Sam promising to be there for her if she needs help, while Dean accepts Mary needing space. However, at a rest stop, Magda is killed by Mr. Ketch of the British Men of Letters to clean up the Winchester's mess.

== Reception ==
=== Viewers ===
The episode was watched by 1.81 million viewers with a 0.7/2 share among adults aged 18 to 49. This was a 7% increase in viewership from the previous episode, which was watched by 1.68 million viewers with a 0.6/2 in the 18–49 demographic. This means that 0.7 percent of all households with televisions watched the episode, while 2 percent of all households watching television at that time watched it. Supernatural ranked as the most watched program on The CW in the day, beating Legends of Tomorrow.

=== Critical reviews ===
Professional ratings
Review scores
Source	Rating
TV Fanatic	4.4/5 stars

"American Nightmare" received positive reviews. Sean McKenna from TV Fanatic, gave a 4.4 star rating out of 5, stating: "So, while I enjoyed 'American Nightmare' overall, it would have been a far better ending to close with Sam and Dean wrapping up their latest case and driving the Impala off down the road."

Bridget LaMonica from Den of Geek wrote: "The climax is the most intense dinner scene in which I was definitely shouting at the TV. Very Jonestown-inspired. Sam was as helpless as the viewer, watching as this family was killed 'for their own good.'"

Amy Ratcliffe from Nerdist wrote, "The Winchesters are down to a party of two again. With Mary gone and taking some time for herself to get used to not being dead, Sam and Dean got back to the family business. (It's how I'd cope, so I don't fault them.) 'American Nightmare' revisited one of the more horrifying monsters in Supernatural: humans."
