= Alpha and Omega (Supernatural) =

- Supernatural episode
- Episode no.: Season 11; Episode 23
- Directed by: Phil Sgriccia
- Written by: Andrew Dabb
- Cinematography by: Serge Ladouceur
- Editing by: Nicole Baer
- Production code: 4X6273
- Original air date: May 25, 2016
- Running time: 41 minutes

Guest appearances
- Ruth Connell as Rowena; Rob Benedict as Chuck Shurley/God; Emily Swallow as Amara/The Darkness; Lisa Berry as Billie; Elizabeth Blackmore as Lady Antonia "Toni" Bevell; Samantha Smith as Mary Winchester (special appearance by)

Episode chronology
← Previous "We Happy Few"	Next → "Keep Calm and Carry On"
- Supernatural season 11

"Alpha and Omega" is the twenty-third episode and season finale of the paranormal drama television series Supernatural's season 11, and the 241st overall. The episode was written by co-executive producer Andrew Dabb and directed by executive producer Phil Sgriccia. It was first broadcast on May 25, 2016, on The CW. In the episode, God is severely wounded while Amara is now going ahead with her plans to destroy the world while Sam and Dean have a last chance to stop her. The episode is the last episode in the tenure of showrunner Jeremy Carver as he departed the show at the conclusion of the season, being replaced by Andrew Dabb and Robert Singer in the role of showrunners. The episode also introduces Elizabeth Blackmore as Lady Antonia "Toni" Bevell, who was announced to have a recurring role in the show's twelfth season.

While the season finale received positive reviews, it received less acclaim than the previous season finales, mostly for the way Amara's arc was ended.

== Plot ==
Dean (Jensen Ackles) checks on Lucifer (Misha Collins), discovering that Castiel is in possession of his body again. Sam (Jared Padalecki) then checks on God (Rob Benedict), who is severely wounded. Crowley (Mark A. Sheppard) and Rowena (Ruth Connell) appear where they take them outside to discover that the sky is turning red as the sun is dying.

God transports them back to the bunker, where Dean decides to spend the last moments drinking beer. In London, Lady Antonia "Toni" Bevell (Elizabeth Blackmore) is notified by someone about the recent events, where she is revealed to have been looking for Sam and Dean. Back in the bunker, Sam proposes that they kill Amara (Emily Swallow) as the only way to bring balance to the universe as God is dying. God reveals that a powerful supernova may be enough to kill her. As He's dying and the Book of the Damned can't cast a spell like that, Castiel proposes that the souls of humans may be enough to make it happen. They also use ghosts from the Waverly Hills Sanatorium, pulling them into a crystal to form a bomb.

As the group tries to find enough souls for their bomb, the reaper Billie arrives and offers her help. Billie is able to get them hundreds of thousands of souls by raiding the veil between life and death which Rowena then places into Dean. After visiting his mother's grave, Dean makes amends with everyone and the weakening God teleports him to an enclosed park where Amara is. Amara reveals she knows about Dean's bomb, but also expresses regret over her actions as angry or not, she still loves her brother. Rather than killing Amara, Dean convinces her that revenge isn't worth it and no matter how angry you get at them, you still love family. Amara brings God to the scene and admits she was jealous when he made Creation and she wasn't all there was to him anymore. Admitting that God has created something truly beautiful, Amara asks for her brother back. God and Amara forgive each other and Amara heals God's injuries, saving him and the universe while Sam and the others believe Dean killed Amara.

God and Amara then disappear, planning on spending time together. Before departing, Amara tells Dean he gave her what she wanted most, her brother back, so she'll do the same for him. Sam and Castiel go to the bunker where Toni is revealed to be inside and banishes Castiel. She holds Sam at gunpoint, stating that she's from the London chapter of the Men of Letters and they sent her to retrieve Sam and Dean for punishment for their previous altercations about the Leviathans, Lucifer and the Darkness. When Sam tries to talk her down, she shoots him and he collapses. Meanwhile, Dean tries to find his way back to civilization and discovers Amara's gift to him: a confused and resurrected Mary Winchester (Samantha Smith).

== Reception ==
=== Viewers ===
The episode was watched by 1.84 million viewers with a 0.7/3 share among adults aged 18 to 49. This was a 15% increase in viewership from the previous episode, which was watched by 1.59 million viewers. The episode was also an increase in viewership from the previous season finale, which was watched by 1.73 million viewers, but it was a slight decrease from the season premiere, watched by 1.94 million viewers. This means that 0.7 percent of all households with televisions watched the episode, while 3 percent of all households watching television at that time watched it. Supernatural ranked as the second most watched program on The CW in the day, behind Arrow.

=== Critical reviews ===
Professional ratings
Review scores
Source	Rating
IGN	6.4
TV Fanatic	2.7
Den of Geek	5/5 stars

"Alpha and Omega" received generally mixed to positive reviews. Matt Fowler of IGN gave the episode an "okay" 6.4 out of 10 and wrote in his verdict, "'Alpha and Omega' stumbled hard because there honestly couldn't be any other outcome to the Amara storyline other than a total truce. The ground rules the show had set up meant that it was either reconciliation or - well - no show. So while the season sporadically sucked us in by dealing with the fate of the entire universe, things still fell apart here at the finish."

Sean McKenna from TV Fanatic, gave a 2.7 star rating out of 5, stating: "I was definitely wondering where Supernatural could possibly go after tackling the Darkness, but maybe bringing the battle back to Earth, and not on such a massive scale, might be a good thing? 'Alpha and Omega' wasn't the fantastic conclusion I was hoping for. Sure, there was a lot to like about Supernatural Season 11 with some strong and entertaining outings throughout, but it's a bummer that all that buildup pretty much got wiped away with an anti-climactic finale."

Bridget LaMonica from Den of Geek, gave a perfect 5 star rating out of 5, stating: "In expected cliffhanger fashion, we're left with a couple loose ends, but this season had a different flavor. In a previous season, they might have ended this with the boys looking up in the sky, someone remarking that the sun is dying, and a quick cut to the end credits. I'm happy for the resolution to the Amara storyline and eager to see what next season will bring with this Men of Letters (London chapter) craziness. I'm also eager to see Sam's fate and whether Dean has found himself in Heaven or if Mary is going to be hunting alongside her boys. We've got a while before we find out."

Sara Netzley of EW wrote, "Well, that was a different feel for a Supernatural finale, no? After a hugely enjoyable 11th season that saw some fantastic episodes (Baby! The Vessel! Don’t Call Me Shurley!), the season-long battle of darkness versus light ended with hand holding, family therapy, and a pillar of yin and yang smoke. Still, we're left with two mysteries to ponder until the fall."

MaryAnn Sleasman of TV.com wrote, "'Alpha and Omega' was one of those finales that changed the landscape of the Winchesters' world but didn't also try to replace one big bad with another. The world isn't on the verge of ruin—for once—and aside from Sam, even Team Free Will's personal lives are in okay shape. I'm sure the ramifications of Mary's return will be horrific, and, in the end, Dean is just going to be more of a traumatized little boy than he was before, but in the meantime, just let the man have his mom."
