= The French Mistake =

- Supernatural episode
- Episode no.: Season 6 Episode 15
- Directed by: Charles Beeson
- Written by: Ben Edlund
- Cinematography by: Serge Ladouceur
- Editing by: Nicole Baer
- Production code: 3X6065
- Original air date: February 25, 2011

Guest appearances
- Brian Doyle-Murray as Robert Singer; Genevieve Padalecki as herself; Sebastian Roché as Balthazar; Lanette Ware as Raphael; Carlos Sanz as Virgil; Micah A. Hauptman as Eric Kripke; Jason Bryden as Kevin Parks; Art Kitching as Serge Ladouceur; Lou Bollo as himself; Garwin Sanford as Jim Michaels; Phil Hayes as Clif Kosterman; Hilary Jardine as Sera Gamble (voice only)

Episode chronology
← Previous "Mannequin 3: The Reckoning"	Next → "...And Then There Were None"
- Supernatural season 6

"The French Mistake" is the fifteenth episode of the sixth season of paranormal drama television series Supernatural. It was first broadcast on The CW on February 25, 2011. In this episode, Sam and Dean are sent to an alternate reality by the angel Balthazar, where they are called actors named "Jared Padalecki" and "Jensen Ackles" who play Sam and Dean in a television show that follows their lives named Supernatural. Furthermore, in this reality, nothing supernatural exists. Sam and Dean attempt to return to their reality, but are hampered by their lives as actors as well as the crew of their TV show.

== Plot ==
Sam (Jared Padalecki) and Dean Winchester (Jensen Ackles) are at the house of Bobby Singer (Jim Beaver) when the rogue angel Balthazar (Sebastian Roché) appears. To protect them from the archangel Raphael, Balthazar gives them a key that he claims unlocks a cache of stolen angelic weapons; he then performs a spell that sends the brothers to an alternate reality.

Sam and Dean suddenly find themselves in an alternate version of Vancouver, Canada, where they learn that they are actors known as "Jared Padalecki" and "Jensen Ackles". Additionally, the two discover they are the stars of a TV show called Supernatural, which is based on the "fictional" adventures of their own lives. Sam and Dean promptly try to contact Castiel but instead encounter an actor named "Misha Collins". The brothers deduce that they must perform Balthazar's spell to return home, but when they search the Supernatural set, they are dismayed to learn that the necessary ingredients are unavailable.

After purchasing bonafide saints' bones, Sam and Dean return to the Supernatural set and try to perform the exit spell. To their dismay, nothing happens, and the two conclude that in this reality, there is no real magic and the supernatural does not exist. Suddenly, Raphael's hitman, Virgil (Carlos Sanz), appears from their reality and attempts to kill Sam and Dean. When the angel confronts the two, however, he realizes that his angelic powers are gone. Sam and Dean manage to subdue him in a fight, but not before Virgil pickpockets the key from Dean and flees.

"Jared" and "Jensen's" strange behavior prompts the director, Bob Singer (portrayed by Brian Doyle-Murray), to call showrunner Sera Gamble, who agrees to have Eric Kripke (portrayed by Micah A. Hauptman) come talk to them. Meanwhile, Virgil kills "Misha" and uses his blood to contact Raphael. After hearing about Misha's death, Sam and Dean investigate; the two learn from a witness that the murderer was speaking to "Raphael" and will return to the Supernatural set to be pulled back to their reality.

Just as Kripke arrives on set to speak with Sam and Dean, Virgil appears and goes on a killing spree, murdering Kripke, Bob Singer, and many other crew members. Sam and Dean manage to knock him out and retrieve the key, just as Raphael activates the gate. Returning to their original reality, Sam and Dean find themselves face-to-face with Raphael (Lanette Ware), who demands the key and begins to torture them when they refuse. Just then, Balthazar arrives and reveals that the key was a fake and the whole trip was a diversion. Angered, Raphael threatens to kill them all, but Castiel arrives, now in possession of Heaven's weapons. Outmaneuvered, Raphael flees, and Castiel returns Sam and Dean to Bobby's house.

== Production ==
The title of "The French Mistake" is a reference to the climax of the 1974 American satirical western film Blazing Saddles, where a fight breaks out that literally breaks the fourth wall, spilling over into an adjacent movie set, where the musical number The French Mistake is being filmed.

== Reception ==
"The French Mistake" aired on The CW on February 25, 2011. The episode was watched by 2.18 million viewers with a 1.0/4 share among adults aged 18 to 49. This means that 1.0 percent of all households with televisions watched the episode, while 3 percent of all households watching television at that time watched it. Supernatural ranked as the second most-watched program on The CW in the day, behind Smallville.

Zack Handlen of The A.V. Club gave "The French Mistake" an A, calling it "Supernatural at its most gloriously self-referential". While noting that the episode was not perfect, Handlen nevertheless found the entry to be humorous and "smart" in a way that prevented him from "really want[ing] to poke holes in it".

Diana Steenbergen of IGN gave "The French Mistake" a 9.5 score out of 10 and applauded the show writers for taking "an insane idea and turn it into gold". In particular, Steenbergen cited the episode's willingness to playfully lampoon the shows stars and producers as one of its strongest elements.

In her book Supernatural: A History of Television's Unearthly Road Trip (2021), Erin Giannini ranked "The French Mistake" at number 16 on a list of "must-see" episodes. Calling it "the most meta of the series' many meta episodes," Giannini praised the episode for not "just break[ing] the fourth wall," but instead "pulveriz[ing] it".

The episode has become a large point of discussion among the show's fans, as well as the cast and crew, due to its in-jokes and meta plot. In particular, creator Eric Kripke and actor Jared Padalecki have cited "The French Mistake" as one of their all time favorite episodes of the show.

== Bibliography ==
- Knight, Nicholas (2011). Supernatural: The Official Companion Season 6. London, UK: Titan Books. ISBN 9780857682895.
