= Rock Never Dies =

- Supernatural episode
- Episode no.: Season 12; Episode 7
- Directed by: Eduardo Sanchez
- Written by: Robert Berens
- Cinematography by: Serge Ladouceur
- Editing by: Donald L. Koch
- Production code: T13.19957
- Original air date: December 1, 2016
- Running time: 42 minutes

Guest appearances
- Rick Springfield as Lucifer / Vince Vincente; Woody Jeffreys as Tommy; Kadeem Hardison as Russel Lemmons

Episode chronology
← Previous "Celebrating the Life of Asa Fox"	Next → "LOTUS"
- Supernatural season 12

"Rock Never Dies" is the seventh episode of the paranormal drama television series Supernatural's season 12, and the 248th overall. The episode was written by supervising producer Robert Berens and directed by Eduardo Sanchez. It was first broadcast on December 1, 2016, on The CW. In the episode, Sam and Dean find that Lucifer is using Vince Vincente as a way to start his new career with worshipers. They along with Castiel and Crowley seek to stop him from killing the audience at one of his concerts.

The episode received mixed reviews with critics criticizing Lucifer's motives and actions in the episode.

== Plot ==
Temporarily fixing his vessel with one of his fossilized angel feathers, Lucifer (Rick Springfield) revives Vince Vincente's rock career in Los Angeles for fresh worshipers. Dean (Jensen Ackles), Sam (Jared Padalecki), Castiel (Misha Collins), and Crowley (Mark A. Sheppard) try intimidating those in Vince's circle to find out where his concert will be held, without success until Lucifer's forcing Vince's manager to kill himself gets bandmate Tommy (Woody Jeffreys) to text Castiel the location. Lucifer kills the rest of the band and beats Castiel and Crowley, though the Winchesters scare the rest of the humans away to safety. Lucifer reveals he has no plan and is upset that God apologized to him only to leave again to be with Amara. Now Lucifer believes everything is pointless and he just wants to have fun by making people suffer. The effort of the battle burns through Vince's body and Lucifer escapes with a promise to go on to bigger things.

== Reception ==
=== Viewers ===
The episode was watched by 1.80 million viewers with a 0.6/2 share among adults aged 18 to 49. This was the same viewership from the previous episode, which was watched by 1.80 million viewers with a 0.7/3 in the 18-49 demographics. This means that 0.6 percent of all households with televisions watched the episode, while 2 percent of all households watching television at that time watched it. Supernatural ranked as the second most watched program on The CW in the day, behind Legends of Tomorrow.

=== Critical reviews ===
"Rock Never Dies" received mixed reviews. Sean McKenna from TV Fanatic, gave a 2 star rating out of 5, stating: "This was an episode that left me bored through most of it and more disappointed by the end. And that's frustrating, especially because Sam and Dean were dealing with Lucifer, a character that has been mostly so memorable and fantastic, and not just some throwaway monster of the week. I really hope Supernatural Season 12 can kick it into gear for the midseason finale because it would be nice to get an exciting and investing episode before the show goes on hiatus for a while. Fingers crossed!"

Bridget LaMonica from Den of Geek wrote: "So why didn't I think this episode was awesome? I didn't like the lack of direction with Lucifer's motives. Maybe that's supposed to make him feel more dangerous, but to me it feels like a lack of story arc for our main villain of the season. I hope that changes soon, perhaps revealed during the mid-season finale. This episode also felt cheap – I don't know how to explain it, but I really noticed how empty it was by mid-episode. Maybe that's just the soulless design of LA. Thanks a lot, Crowley. Well, the story arc could use some bolstering, but other than that we had a fun little ride here in Rock Never Dies."

Samantha Highfill from EW was more positive with the episode, giving it a "B+" and wrote, "With that, we've got another hour in the bank, and I really enjoyed this one. There were so many great lines that made it one of the funnier episodes this season, but I also love the way they handled Lucifer and tied in the idea of social media and celebrity in today's world. This episode was not only funny, but it was relevant and, of course, very creative."
