= Charles Beeson (director) =

British television director (1957–2021)

- Born: 10 May 1957
- Died: 26 April 2021 (aged 63)
- Occupation: Television director
- Years active: 1981–2021

Charles Beeson (10 May 1957 – 26 April 2021) was a British television director.

== Life and career ==
Some of his credits include the films: Second Sight, Four Minutes, Stranded, Cider with Rosie, Thursday 12th, and episodes of EastEnders, Spooks, Inspector Morse, Kavanagh QC and Casualty. He also worked on the American series Close to Home, Terminator: The Sarah Connor Chronicles, The Mentalist, The Vampire Diaries, Supernatural, Smallville, Person of Interest, Fringe, Alcatraz and Revolution, The Whispers, Containment, Timeless and the TV adaptation of Around the World in 80 Days. He worked as an executive producer on The Enemy Within for NBC.

He attended Churcher's College.

He was based in Los Angeles and supported Portsmouth F.C.

Episode 7 of the BBC drama Around the World in 80 Days, which he directed, is dedicated to his memory.

On 26 April 2021, Beeson died of a heart attack.
