= John Showalter (director) =

American television director and editor

John F. Showalter
- Other name: John Showalter
- Occupations: Television director, editor and producer
- Years active: 1981–present

John F. Showalter is an American television director and editor.

He is well known for his work on Without a Trace, The Mentalist and Supernatural.

== Career ==
Showalter's directing credits include Ghost Whisperer, House, Criminal Minds, Without a Trace, Supernatural, The Mentalist, Supergirl, and The Flash, as well as editing episodes of Lois & Clark: The New Adventures of Superman, Gideon's Crossing, Glory Days, Timeless, and The 100.
