= Robert Singer (producer) =

American television producer, director and writer

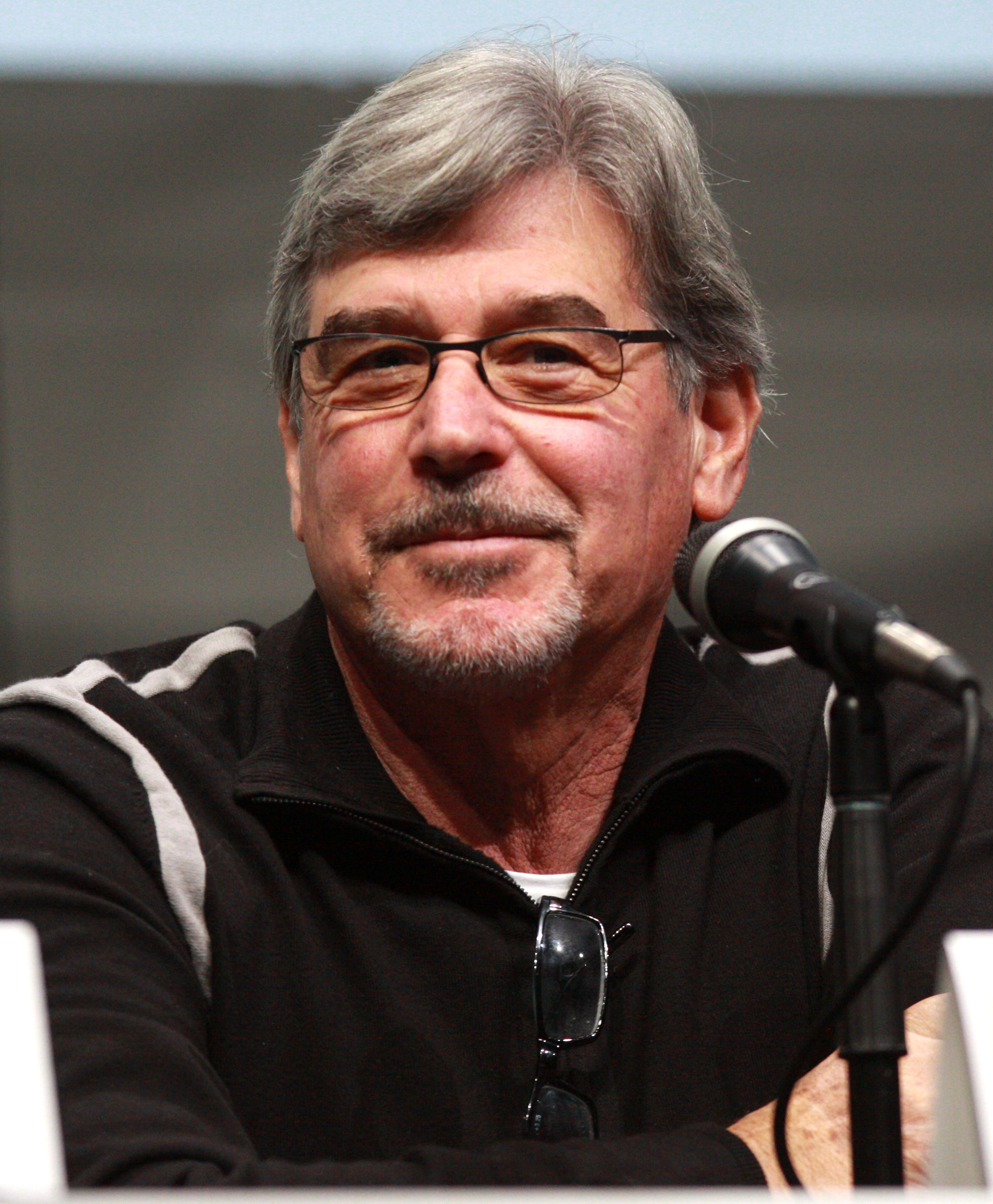
- Robert Singer at the 2013 San Diego Comic-Con in San Diego, California.
- Born: January 3, 1944 (age 82)
- Occupations: television producer; director; writer

Robert Singer (born January 3, 1944) is an American television producer, director and writer. He is known for his work on Supernatural where he served as an executive producer, senior director and occasional writer. The character Bobby Singer was named after him. A fictionalized version of Singer appears in the season 6 episode The French Mistake played by Brian Doyle-Murray. Singer also created the series Reasonable Doubts and has worked as a producer and director on various television series, including Lois & Clark: The New Adventures of Superman. He also served as a producer for the films Cujo and Burnt Offerings.
