= Elizabeth Blackmore =

Australian actress (born 1986/1987)

- Born: 1986/1987 (age 39–40); Perth, Western Australia
- Education: Western Australian Academy of Performing Arts
- Occupation: Actress
- Years active: 2008–present
- Children: 1

Elizabeth Blackmore (born 1986/1987) is an Australian actress.

== Early life ==
Blackmore was born 1986/1987 in Perth, Western Australia. She is a graduate of the Western Australian Academy of Performing Arts.

== Career ==
Blackmore first gained attention in 2010 with a recurring role in Legend of the Seeker, filmed in New Zealand. Her first major film role was in the 2013 American production Evil Dead. She predominantly appears in guest roles of single episodes of television series, but has had recurring roles in The Vampire Diaries and Supernatural.

== Personal life ==
In 2013, Blackmore was a finalist for the Heath Ledger Scholarship, which is intended to give emerging Australian talent a chance at success in Hollywood.

As of August 2024, Blackmore was married and had a 3-year-old child.

== Filmography ==
=== Film ===
Year	Title	Role	Notes
2008	Pip's First Time		Short film
2011	Burning Man	Oncology Receptionist	
2013	The Road Home	Dede	Short film
2013	Evil Dead	Natalie	
2013	Nascondino		Short film
2015	Skin Deep	Isabel	
2015	Shadow/Self	Shadow	Short film
2015	Killers and Thieves	Thief	Short film
2020	The Bus to Birra Birra	Arielle	Short film
2024	Sleeping Dogs	Dana Finn	

=== Television ===
Year	Title	Role	Notes
2010	Legend of the Seeker	Sister Marianna	Recurring role (Season 2)
2011	Home and Away	Real Shandi Palmer	2 episodes
2012	Beauty & the Beast	Victoria Hansen	Episode: "Proceed with Caution"
2015–2016	The Vampire Diaries	Valerie Tulle	Recurring role (Season 7)
2016	Once Upon a Time	Mary Lydgate	Episode: "Strange Case"
2016–2017	Supernatural	Lady Toni Bevell	Recurring role (Seasons 11–12)
2016	TURN: Washington's Spies	Sarah Livingston	2 episodes
2017	August Creek (aka Back to Love)	April	Television film
2018	Shooter	Katherine Mansfield	2 episodes
2018	Shameless	Gayle	Episode: "Mo White!"
2020	The Right Stuff	Lurleen Wilson	Episode: "Advent"

=== Theatre ===
Year	Title	Role	Notes
2009	A Midsummer Night’s Dream	Helena	Belvoir Street Theatre, Sydney with B Sharp
2009; 2011	A Midsummer Night’s Dream	Helena	Heath Ledger Theatre, Perth with Black Swan State Theatre Company
2018	In the Next Room (or The Vibrator Play)	Catherine Givings	Heath Ledger Theatre, Perth with Black Swan State Theatre Company
2024	Death of a Salesman	Miss Forsythe	Theatre Royal Sydney
2024	The Queen's Nanny	Marion Crawford	Ensemble Theatre, Sydney
2025	Troy	Cassandra and ensemble	Malthouse Theatre, Melbourne
