= Paranormal fiction =

Fiction genre

Paranormal fiction is a genre of fiction whose story lines revolve around the paranormal.

== Themes ==
=== Werewolves ===
The history of werewolves in media is long and complex. It began in the early 12th century, when stories about werewolves circulated mainly through oral folklore. These tales often carried hidden cultural meanings; in some cases, calling a man a “werewolf” implied that he did not conform to traditional expectations of masculinity or heterosexuality. During this period, certain crimes were also attributed to “werewolves,” and people believed that these creatures were demons sent from hell. Over time, this way of thinking influenced modern media, shaping the common portrayal of werewolves as inherently evil.

In the early 1900s film started to become a major player in the global media. This would lead to the creation of many monster movies involving Dracula and Frankenstein. These films were very repetitive and cliched . For example, the 1935 film Werewolf of London adds questionable humor into the narratives. This is why werewolves in media never received the same attention or widespread distribution like other monster movies.

In modern media such as romance novels, werewolves started to gain popularity with people. Some reader find the idea of a werewolf to be very attractive and they like the loyalty that they will have because they are half wolf. It presents an ideal type of man who has the passion and loyalty that an alpha werewolf has for its mate. In the early 2010s tv shows like Teen Wolf and Twilight start to come out which depict werewolves as heroes instead of monsters like earlier films.

=== Witches in modern media ===
Witches have been portrayed in a wide array of styles, from villainous figures in horror to heroic or comedic characters in fantasy. Popular examples include The Wizard of Oz, Harry Potter and numerous televisions series exploring witchcraft in contemporary settings. Paranormal witches have been portrayed as well in many other movies such as the Disney movie Hocus Pocus, Twitches etc. Authors have frequently used witches and other paranormal stuff for entertaining purposes. These particular characters are always popular around Halloween with children. One of the first artists to use witches in fiction was Shakespeare who used witches in literature. Media changed the "evil" stereotype of what witches seem to be, before turning them into characters for entertainment, movies, theater and cosplayers. Some specific examples from characters will be Hermoine from Harry Potter who is a brilliant young witch that practices witchcraft in Hogwarts. Another example is Maleficent from the movie The Sleeping Beauty who is an elegant character yet vengeful. She appears at first to be a typical evil witch that shows her sentimental humane side.

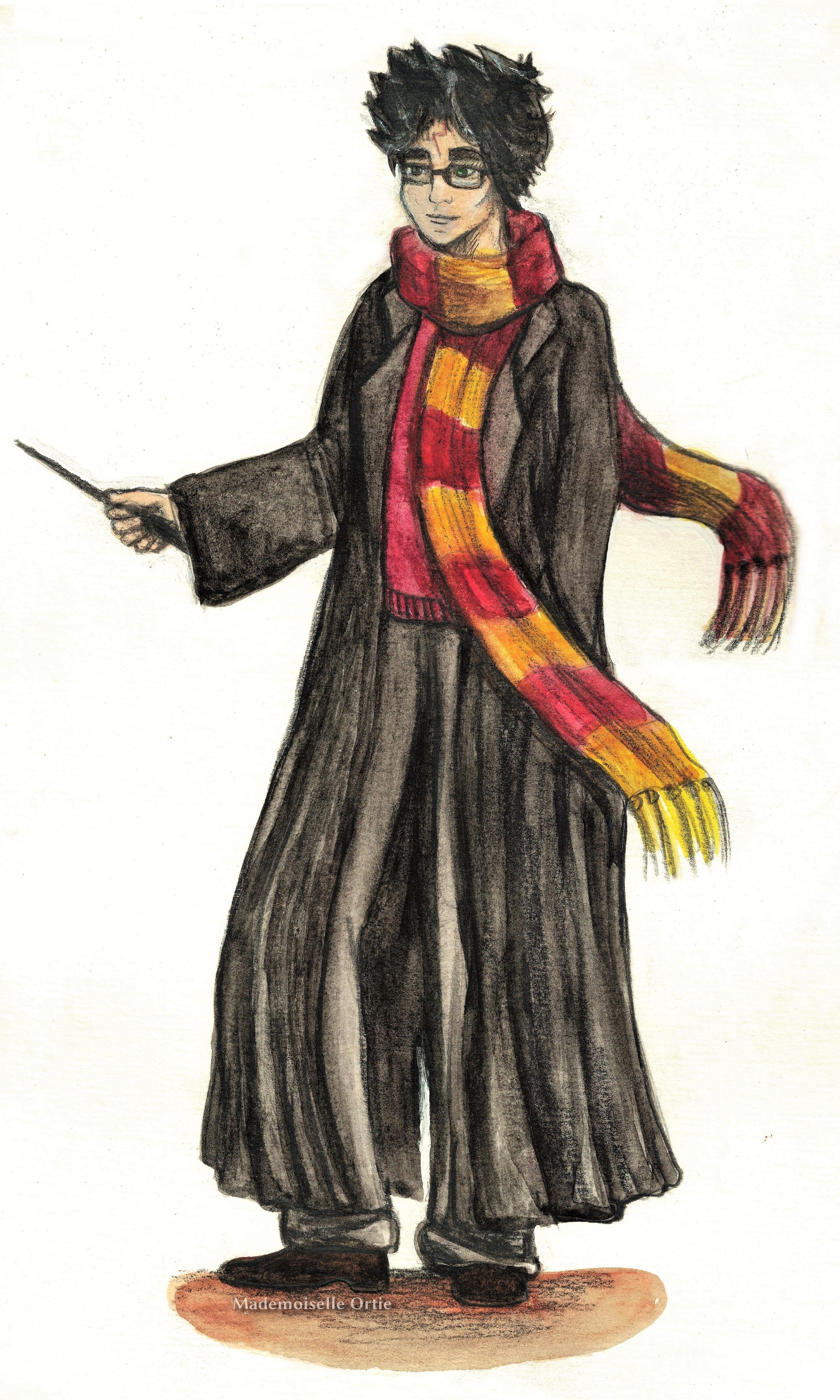

=== Ghosts ===
Ghosts and hauntings have been portrayed in many different styles, mostly horror and thriller leaning. Many ghost hauntings and paranormal activity act as a means of "the past coming back" to haunt and remind the character of their past actions. Most notable paranormal fiction in literature being Beloved by Toni Morrison.

== Sub genres ==
- Paranormal romance

== Television ==
- The X-Files, a suspense drama television series in which characters investigate various paranormal phenomena.
- So Weird, a Disney adventure drama television show about an unorthodox American family and its experiences with paranormal phenomena, starring Mackenzie Phillips, Cara DeLizia and Alexz Johnson.
- Supernatural, a television drama in which two brothers battle paranormal forces.
- Ghost Whisperer
- The River (U.S. TV series), a new television drama in which characters searching for a missing person in the Amazon find a paranormal being threatening their lives.
- Stranger Things, a Netflix tv series about a little boy's disappearance and a peculiar little girl's reappearance. The little boy's friends, family, and the local sheriff all try to figure out what is going on, as they race against time and government officials who are trying to stop them.
- Gravity Falls
- Twin Peaks
- Wayward Pines

== Film ==
- The Exorcist, a 1973 horror film.
- Poltergeist, a 1982 horror film.
- The Entity, a 1982 suspense film about a single mother repeatedly raped by a spirit.
- Ghostbusters, a 1984 adventure comedy film about three unemployed parapsychology professors who set up shop as a unique ghost-removal service.
- Ghostbusters II, a 1989 sequel to the first movie.
- Ghostbusters: Afterlife, a 2021 sequel to the first movie.
- Ghostbusters (2016), a remake to the first movie.
- Paranormal Activity, a 2007 horror film.
