= Prip =

Prip is a surname. Notable people with the surname include:

- Henrik Prip (born 1960), Danish actor
- John Prip (1922–2009), American metalsmith, industrial designer, and educator
- Louka Prip (born 1997), Danish footballer
- Yadira Guevara-Prip (born 1995), American stage and television actress
