= Kim Rhodes =

American actress (born 1969)

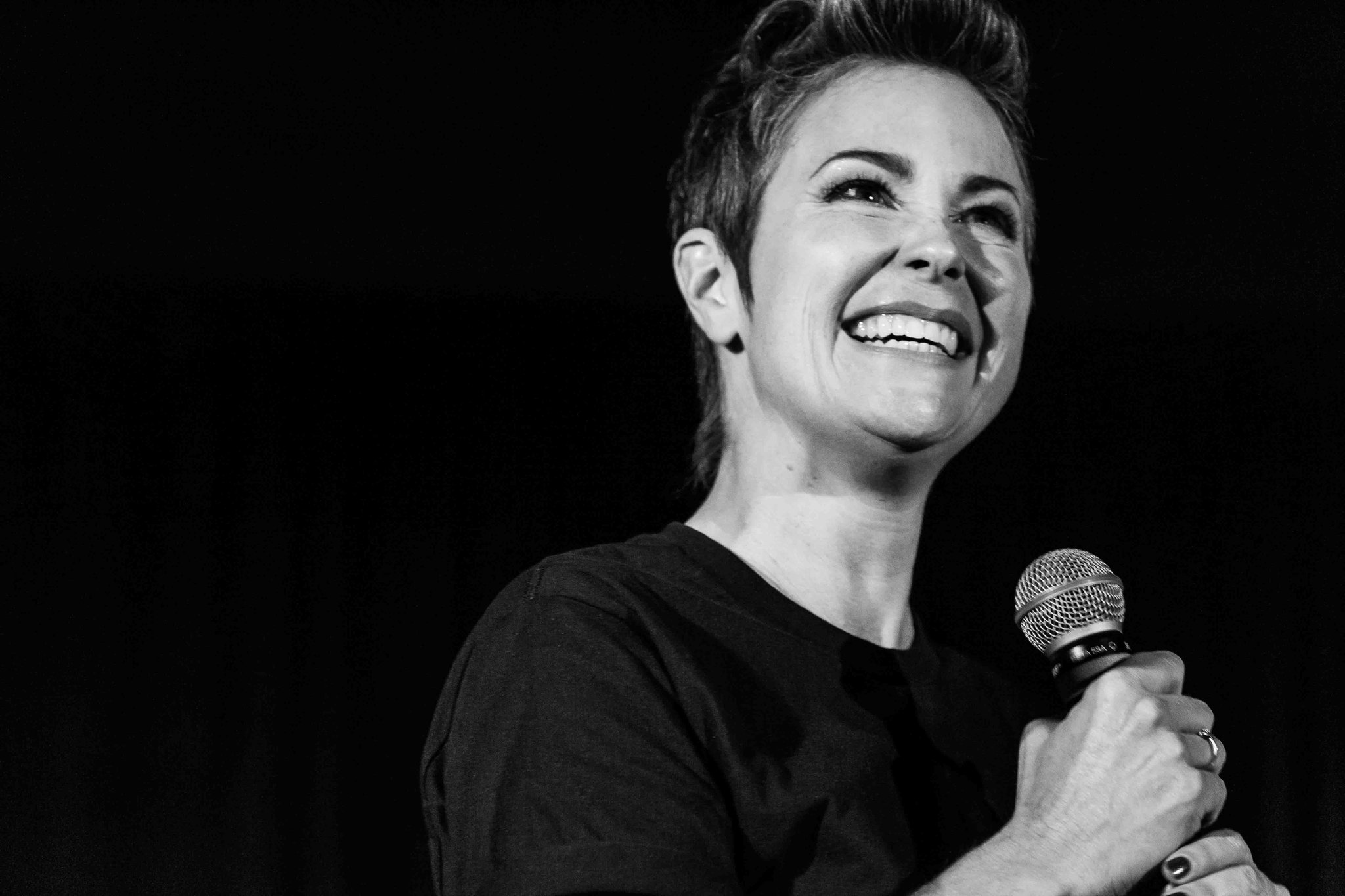
- Rhodes at Creation Entertainment Salute to Supernatural, Cleveland 2018
- Born: June 7, 1969 (age 57); Portland, Oregon, U.S.
- Education: Southern Oregon University; Temple University (MFA)
- Occupations: Actress; singer
- Years active: 1996–present
- Spouse: Travis Hodges (m. 2006)
- Children: 1

Kim Rhodes (born June 7, 1969) is an American actress who is known for portraying Cindy Harrison on the soap operas Another World (1996–1999) and As the World Turns (2000–2001), Carey Martin on the Disney Channel sitcoms The Suite Life of Zack & Cody (2005–2008) and The Suite Life on Deck (2008–2011), and Sheriff Jody Mills on Supernatural (2010–2020).

== Early life ==
Rhodes was born and raised in Portland, Oregon. She graduated from Benson Polytechnic High School, and then attended Southern Oregon University, graduating in 1991, and earned a Master of Fine Arts from Temple University.

== Career ==
In 1997, while performing in Another World, Rhodes was nominated, along with Mark Pinter, for a Soap Opera Digest Award as "Favorite New Couple". For Rhodes's first Another World fan club luncheon, she rewrote the lyrics for "All For the Best" from Godspell. Prior to her Disney Channel début, she had previously acted with the Oregon Shakespeare Festival for one season, portraying the roles of "Daphne Stillington" in Noël Coward's Present Laughter and "Helena" in Shakespeare's A Midsummer Night's Dream.

In 2005, Rhodes was cast as Carey Martin on The Suite Life of Zack & Cody. Her character was notorious for her spiky blonde hair and her can-do attitude. She later reprised her role with several cameo appearances on the spin-off series The Suite Life on Deck from 2008 to 2011.

In 2010, she was cast as Sheriff Jody Mills on the CW's show Supernatural. She first appeared in Season 5; episode "Dead Men Don't Wear Plaid", with her character appearing in every season since as a guest star.

In 2018, Season 13; episode “Wayward Sisters“ was used as a backdoor pilot for a possible spin-off series of the same name, intended to feature Rhodes and fellow actresses Briana Buckmaster and Kathryn Newton as the main characters. The new series ultimately did not move forward. Rhodes performs, alongside other Supernatural's cast members, in Jason Manns' 2018 album "Recovering With Friends."

== Personal life ==
Rhodes married actor Travis Hodges in 2006 and they reside in Los Angeles, California. They have a daughter, who is autistic. In August 2022, Rhodes shared that she had been diagnosed with autism that year.

== Filmography ==
Film
Year	Film	Role	Notes
2001	In Pursuit	Ann Sutton	
2004	Christmas with the Kranks	Julie	
2005	Sky High	Elastic Girl/Prof. Jeannie Elast	Deleted scenes
2008	Mostly Ghostly	Harriett Doyle	
2008	Desertion	Jane Nichols	
2008	A Kiss at Midnight	Maureen O'Connor the Nun	
2010	Cyrus	Dr. Dallas	
2010	Deadbeat	K.D.	
2011	Mine	Waitress	Short film
2011	November 1	Marisa	Short film
2011	Beethoven's Christmas Adventure	Christine	Direct-to-video
2012	Atlas Shrugged: Part 2	Lillian Rearden	
2016	Riding 79	Betty	
2022	Strong Enough	Karrie	
Television
Year	Show	Role	Notes
1996–1999	Another World	Cynthia "Cindy" Brooke Harrison	95 episodes
2000–2001	As the World Turns	Cindy Harrison	Unknown episodes
2001	The Lot	Rachel Lipton	13 episodes
2005–2008	The Suite Life of Zack & Cody	Carey Martin	Main role
2008–2011	The Suite Life on Deck	Carey Martin	4 episodes
2010–2020	Supernatural	Sheriff Jody Mills	Guest role (seasons 5–6, 8–12, 14–15); recurring (seasons 7, 13)
2011	A Crush on You	Val Brookston	Television film
2013	Switched at Birth	Tria	2 episodes
2014–2016	Gortimer Gibbon's Life on Normal Street	Vicki Bowen	9 episodes
2016	Colony	Rachel	6 episodes
2017	Criminal Minds: Beyond Borders	Asst. Director Linda Barnes	2 episodes
2018	Criminal Minds	Asst. Director Linda Barnes	4 episodes
2022–2023	Kung Fu	Carrie	6 episodes
Guest appearances
Year	Show	Role	Notes
1999	Martial Law	Roxanne Cole	
2000	Star Trek: Voyager	Ensign Lyndsay Ballard / Jhet'leya	Episode: "Ashes to Ashes"
2000	Stark Raving Mad	Brooke	
2000	One World	Diane	
2001	Titus	Tiffany	
2001	The Invisible Man	Eleanor Stark	
2002	Becker	Julie	
2002	Touched by an Angel	Liz	
2002	Boomtown	Julia Sloan	
2002	Monk	Katy Lindmen	
2002	Without a Trace	Polly	
2002	Strong Medicine	Marla Cole	Episode: "Contraindications"
2004	CSI: Crime Scene Investigation	Lydia Lopez	Episode: "Dead Ringer"
2009	House M.D.	Flirting woman at fundraiser	Episode: "Broken"
2011	Free Agents	Kate	
2012	Till Death Do Us Part	Suzette	
2014	NCIS	CIA Officer Sandra Jenkins	
2015	Key and Peele	Widow	
2015	Extant	Nicole	
Video games
Year	Title	Role	Notes
2001	Star Trek: Away Team	Yulana Oxila	
2015	Star Trek Online	Jhet'leya	Mission "Dust to Dust"
2021	Persona 5 Strikers	Mariko Hyodo	English Dub

== Awards and nominations ==
Accolades received by Kim Rhodes
Year	Work	Award	Category	Result	Ref.
1998	Another World	Soap Opera Digest Awards	Favorite New Couple	Nominated	
