= Supernatural season 13 =

Supernatural
- Season 13
- DVD cover art
- Showrunners: Andrew Dabb; Robert Singer
- Starring: Jared Padalecki; Jensen Ackles; Mark Pellegrino; Alexander Calvert; Misha Collins
- No. of episodes: 23

Release
- Original network: The CW
- Original release: October 12, 2017 – May 17, 2018

Season chronology
- ← Previous; Season 12 Next → Season 14

The thirteenth season of Supernatural, an American dark fantasy television series created by Eric Kripke, premiered on October 12, 2017, on The CW and concluded on May 17, 2018. The season consists of 23 episodes and aired on Thursdays at 8:00 pm (ET). This is the second season with Andrew Dabb and Robert Singer as showrunners.

This season featured a backdoor pilot to a possible spin-off series called Wayward Sisters, starring Kim Rhodes as Sheriff Jody Mills, Briana Buckmaster as Sheriff Donna Hanscum, Kathryn Newton as Claire Novak, Katherine Ramdeen as Alex Jones, Clark Backo as Patience Turner and Yadira Guevara-Prip as Kaia Nieves. The spin-off was ultimately not chosen to move forward as a series. The season also featured an animated crossover episode with Scooby-Doo. The season follows Sam and Dean who, after locating and saving Lucifer's offspring, try to use his powers to find a way back to the Apocalypse World, and save their mother, Mary.

== Cast ==
=== Starring ===
- Jared Padalecki as Sam Winchester
- Jensen Ackles as Dean Winchester / Michael
- Mark Pellegrino as Lucifer (Note: Only credited for their respective episode appearances.)
- Alexander Calvert as Jack Kline
- Misha Collins as Castiel

=== Special guest stars ===
- Loretta Devine as Missouri Moseley
- Jim Beaver as Bobby Singer
- Felicia Day as Charlie Bradbury

=== Guest stars ===
- Samantha Smith as Mary Winchester
- Ruth Connell as Rowena MacLeod
- Osric Chau as Kevin Tran
- Kim Rhodes as Sheriff Jody Mills
- Briana Buckmaster as Sheriff Donna Hanscum
- Kathryn Newton as Claire Novak
- Katherine Ramdeen as Alex Jones
- Clark Backo as Patience Turner
- Yadira Guevara-Prip as Kaia Nieves / Dark Kaia
- Christian Keyes as Michael
- Keith Szarabajka as Donatello Redfield
- Seth Isaac Johnson as Shawn Raider
- Courtney Ford as Kelly Kline
- Jeffrey Vincent Parise as Asmodeus
- Lisa Berry as Billie / Death
- David Haydn-Jones as Arthur Ketch
- Danneel Ackles as Sister Jo / Anael
- Brendan Taylor as Doug Stover
- Richard Speight Jr. as Gabriel / Loki
- Chad Rook as Zachariah
- Erica Cerra as Dumah
- Amanda Tapping as Naomi
- Katherine Evans as Maggie

== Episodes ==
| No. overall | No. in season | Title | Directed by | Written by | Original release date | Prod. code | U.S. viewers (millions) |
|---|---|---|---|---|---|---|---|
| 265 | 1 | "Lost and Found" | Phil Sgriccia | Andrew Dabb | October 12, 2017 | T13.20551 | 2.10 |
Lucifer's son Jack seems unsure of himself and the world. Dean tries to shoot him and he knocks out both Winchesters with a sonic scream, leaving to search for his father. He ends up at a local police station and seems mostly innocent but is unsure of, and unable to control, his power. Sam and Dean follow; Dean insists on killing him but Sam sees Jack as just a child. While Dean explains what Jack is to a local officer, Sam gains Jack's trust and Jack explains he learned English from his mother and grew up quickly because she told him the world was dangerous; she also said that Castiel was the father who would protect him. Three angels show up wanting to use Jack's almost limitless power for themselves. The Winchesters banish two of them and kill the third; Jack is stabbed in the heart in the process but is unharmed by the blade. Dean agrees to take him to the bunker, but only until they can find a way to kill him. They are on their own with Chuck not answering prayers. They give Castiel and Kelly a hunter's funeral, also saying goodbye to Crowley and Mary whom they assume Lucifer killed. In the alternate world, Lucifer keeps Mary alive because he needs her for something.
| 266 | 2 | "The Rising Son" | Thomas J. Wright | Eugenie Ross-Leming & Brad Buckner | October 19, 2017 | T13.20552 | 1.90 |
On the way back to the bunker, the Winchesters and Jack stop at a hotel and are met by Donatello the prophet. Amara ate his soul, but he has been mentally making the moral choice ever since, and he was drawn to Jack's power. Jack reads the Bible to learn more about himself and his family. Realizing he will need more protection, the Winchesters try to get him warding tattoos, but he reflexively attacks the tattoo artist for hurting him and his body heals the ink away. Dean takes this as proof that Jack will turn evil, while Sam thinks it's because he lacks control. Meanwhile, the final Prince of Hell, Asmodeus, takes charge of Hell until Lucifer returns, disguising himself as Donatello to trick Jack into freeing the Shedim — Hell's darkest creatures — to be a hero. The brothers and the real Donatello arrive, and when Asmodeus hurts them, Jack lashes out at him with his power and scares him off. At the bunker, Dean admits to Jack that he will kill him if he turns bad. In the alternate world, Lucifer protects Mary, intending to trade her for Jack when they get home. They meet an alternate version of Michael, who killed his world's Lucifer. Michael is the stronger of the two, and keeps this Lucifer alive because he needs him for something.
| 267 | 3 | "Patience" | Robert Singer | Robert Berens | October 26, 2017 | T13.20553 | 1.93 |
Missouri Mosley (from Season 1's "Home") calls the Winchesters because a wraith with a taste for psychics is about to go after her family. Dean and Jody go to protect her son James and granddaughter Patience, who is unaware she has inherited Missouri's gift. The wraith reappears and kills Missouri, as she knew it would. James reveals he cut his mother out of his life many years ago, as he grew up fearing she would get killed and also because he couldn't forgive her after his wife Tess died after becoming sick despite Missouri saying she would be fine. The wraith attacks Patience at school and later kidnaps her from home intending to feed on her slowly. In a vision, Patience sees the wraith kill her father, Jody and Dean. She warns them and Dean kills the wraith. James and Dean think Patience should live a normal life, but Jody says it is Patience's choice and that her door is open if she needs help. Meanwhile, Sam tries to train Jack because he reminds him of his own days addicted to demon blood. Jack makes no progress, which he takes as a sign he will be evil, since his powers only work negatively. Sam has now come to believe in Jack, but Jack overhears Dean tell Sam he still blames Jack for Castiel's death. Realizing for the first time how much Dean needs Castiel, Jack channels Dean's grief and whispers Castiel's name; Castiel hears this and wakes up in a void of nothingness.
| 268 | 4 | "The Big Empty" | John Badham | Meredith Glynn | November 2, 2017 | T13.20554 | 1.82 |
A man is killed by his dead wife. Taking the case, Sam convinces Dean to let Jack join them, also having convinced Jack to help save Mary if he can master his powers. There are no signs of a ghost or revenant. A woman is then killed by her dead son. Both victims shared a grief therapist Mia, whom the guys question pretending to be three brothers that lost their mother. Sam and Dean get into an argument about Mary, and Sam discovers Mia is a shapeshifter. Mia says she only helps people by pretending to be their loved ones to give closure, and the killer must be her ex-boyfriend and fellow shapeshifter, Buddy. While Sam goes to Buddy's address, Buddy actually sneaks into Mia's office and knocks out Dean and Jack. When Mia refuses to kill them, Buddy prepares to shoot Sam when he walks into the room. Jack is able to use his powers to deflect the bullet away from Sam and throw Buddy into the wall, allowing Sam to kill him. Mia in Kelly's form tells Jack that even monsters can do good. At the bunker Dean gives Jack some approval and wants Sam to keep believing Mary is alive, admitting that he no longer seems to believe in anything anymore. Meanwhile, Castiel is in The Empty, a place predating even God and Amara, where all angels and demons sleep forever after they die. Castiel is the first in eternity to wake up. The entity ruling the realm takes Castiel's form and taunts him to go back to sleep as the entity hates being awake. Castiel refuses, demanding his release and forcing the entity to send him back to Earth, where the latter rejoices at being resurrected.
| 269 | 5 | "Advanced Thanatology" | John F. Showalter | Steve Yockey | November 9, 2017 | T13.20555 | 1.71 |
Two teenagers explore an abandoned asylum, and one of them is killed. The survivor, Shawn, is left unable to speak from trauma when taking a medical mask. The brothers take the case. Dean insists he will be fine but clearly isn't. He is unable to get Shawn to talk. Sam discovers the asylum's doctor used to lobotomize his patients, and the next day Shawn disappears. At the asylum Dean burns the masks which destroys the doctor, but the place is still haunted. Dean kills himself to find out where the patients' bodies are. Shawn was possessed by the mask to go back there, and the doctor made him kill himself. A Reaper reports that Dean is in The Veil, and the new Death comes to see him: Billie. As the first Reaper to die after Dean killed the old Death, she took the job, wanting information on how the hole to the other universe ripped open. She sees the Winchesters as important to the universe with work to do. She lets the ghosts move on and sends Dean back, stating his choices decide how he dies. Dean admits to Sam he needs a victory, and they are reunited with Castiel.
| 270 | 6 | "Tombstone" | Nina Lopez-Corrado | Davy Perez | November 16, 2017 | T13.20556 | 1.89 |
After meeting Castiel, Jack finds a case in Dodge City, Kansas. A local deputy is killed and his Uncle Joe, another officer, swears revenge. Dean loves all Western scene material, and he and Castiel go undercover as Texas Rangers while investigating. Questioning the local undertaker, Athena, Sam and Jack realize they are dealing with a ghoul, whom Dean recognizes as wearing the face of the famous outlaw Dave Mather. Dave robs a bank so Athena can afford to go to school in California; she has no idea what Dave really is. The brothers, Castiel and Jack get into a shootout with Dave; Jack blasts him with power but accidentally kills a bank security guard, while Dave escapes. Castiel cannot heal the guard. As the others take Jack back, Dean and Joe investigate the local graveyard where Dave has captured Athena. Dean distracts him so Joe can shoot his head off. Dean has Joe blame the guard's death on Dave. At the bunker, despite the other three saying it was a mistake, a withdrawn Jack believes he is a monster who will end up hurting the others and flees.
| 271 | 7 | "War of the Worlds" | Richard Speight Jr. | Brad Buckner & Eugenie Ross-Leming | November 23, 2017 | T13.20557 | 1.24 |
Castiel informs Sam and Dean that he has a meeting with an angel about Jack but says he needs to go alone. Asmodeus is unable to sense Jack, and is told that the Winchesters no longer have him. In the alternate world, Michael takes most of Lucifer's grace, using his Kevin Tran to create a portal for Lucifer's Earth. Instead, Lucifer escapes and the portal closes. Lucifer arrives back on his Earth, but is greatly weakened. Meanwhile the brothers notice witches being killed. Talking to a survivor, they discover the killer is searching for Rowena and looks like Arthur Ketch. Capturing him, he claims to be Arthur's twin brother, Alexander, who turned his back on the British Men of Letters. Sam finds records of Alexander but Dean is skeptical. Castiel meets with the angel Dumah and is told the angels' population is very low and they intend to force Jack to create more angels when they find him. The angels try to capture Castiel, but Lucifer is able to scare them off. He tries to convince Castiel about the urgent threat of the other Michael, saying they need Jack's power, and he decides not to tell the Winchesters. Asmodeus then appears, deciding he is the ruler of hell, capturing them both. Tracking Castiel, the brothers are attacked by demons but are helped by Alexander, who finally admits he is Arthur. He tells them Rowena gave him a spell to cheat death in exchange for allowing her to escape after being captured by the British Men of Letters some years back, but it needs a recharge so he must find her, insinuating she survived. Dean attacks but Arthur escapes. Asmodeus locks up Lucifer and Castiel and tricks the Winchesters into thinking everything is fine, having worked with Arthur all along.
| 272 | 8 | "The Scorpion and the Frog" | Robert Singer | Meredith Glynn | November 30, 2017 | T13.20558 | 1.73 |
After stealing a Nephilim tracking spell from a British museum, the Crossroad Demon Barthamus offers to trade it to the Winchesters to find Jack. In exchange, Barthamus requests the Winchesters aid his minions Smash and Grab in stealing a trunk from a man named Luther Shrike. Luther has Barthamus' trunk in a vault that only Dean can open due to his previous time in Hell. The Winchesters reluctantly agree to the deal and perform a raid on Luther's property. During the raid, Luther realizes the truth and kills Grab, a demon, before being captured by the Winchesters. With the help of Smash, who is a girl named Alice who once made a deal with Barthamus and is now forced to work for him, the Winchesters are able to retrieve the trunk. To their shock, the Winchesters learn that Luther is a man who once made a deal with Barthamus to save his son only to be double-crossed. The trunk contains Barthamus' human bones, leverage with which Luther can force Barthamus to leave him alone. Barthamus kills Luther, but the Winchesters reject his deal due to Barthamus' actions. Alice kills Barthamus by burning his bones, but the spell is destroyed with him. Despite this, the Winchesters are content with how things turned out as they managed to free Alice from her deal to live a normal life and stop Barthamus.
| 273 | 9 | "The Bad Place" | Phil Sgriccia | Robert Berens | December 7, 2017 | T13.20559 | 1.74 |
Jack approaches a dreamwalker named Derek Swan in order to look into the alternate reality where Mary Winchester and Lucifer were trapped. Shortly afterwards, the Winchesters learn from Sheriff Jody Mills that Derek is dead and Jack is apparently responsible. The Winchesters track down Jack shortly after he helps dreamwalker Kaia Nieves escape from a drug rehabilitation facility. Jack is revealed to be innocent in Derek's death. He reveals that he has been attempting to rescue Mary from the alternate reality, but he needs a dreamwalker in order to see the world so that he can open a portal. The Winchesters and Jack rescue Kaia from angels as they look for Jack to help them repopulate their species. Dean forces Kaia at gunpoint to help them rescue Mary. Under attack by angels, Kaia and Jack combine their powers to open a portal, disintegrating the angels at the same time. Due to Kaia's visions of another reality populated by monsters that she calls the Bad Place, Kaia is deposited on the side of the road, while the Winchesters end up in the Bad Place and Jack is sent to Mary's side in Apocalypse World. At the same time, Patience Turner has visions of the Winchesters and Jody Mills in great danger. Against her father's wishes, Patience leaves to help and warns Jody that something terrible is coming.
| 274 | 10 | "Wayward Sisters" | Phil Sgriccia | Robert Berens & Andrew Dabb | January 18, 2018 | T13.20560 | 1.85 |
After completing a werewolf hunt, Claire Novak gets a call from Jody Mills that the Winchesters are missing, so she returns to Sioux Falls to help with the search. At the same time, the Winchesters remain trapped in the Bad Place where they are ambushed by a hooded figure that apparently intends to feed them to a giant monster. Working together, Jody, Alex, and Claire attempt to locate and rescue the Winchesters. They are joined by Patience Turner who warns of a vision where Claire is impaled and dies in Jody's arms. After locating dreamwalker Kaia Nieves, the group comes under attack by monsters from the Bad Place, making them realize that the rift to the Bad Place is still open. With the help of Kaia and Sheriff Donna Hanscum, Jody's family locates the rift. As Claire and Kaia travel to the Bad Place to rescue the Winchesters, Jody, Alex, Patience and Donna work together to kill several attacking monsters. Claire and Kaia succeed in rescuing the Winchesters before the rift closes, but Kaia is impaled and apparently killed by the hooded figure while saving Claire, and Jody embraces a devastated Claire, which is a truly unexpected outcome of Patience's vision. In the aftermath, Sam warns Jody that more monsters may have made it through the rift in the time that it was open, while Claire mourns Kaia's death, having fallen in love with her. As Claire sits down to eat dinner with her family and swears revenge on Kaia's killer, another rift opens elsewhere and the hooded figure emerges, revealed to be an alternate reality version of Kaia.
| 275 | 11 | "Breakdown" | Amyn Kaderali | Davy Perez | January 25, 2018 | T13.20561 | 1.93 |
In Oshkosh, Nebraska, Donna Hanscum's niece Wendy is kidnapped. Desperate, Donna contacts the Winchesters for help despite the fact that it appears that they are dealing with a human villain rather than a monster. The Winchesters agree to help Donna and team up with Donna, her boyfriend Officer Doug Stover and Agent Clegg of the FBI. Clegg identifies the villain as the Butterfly, a serial abductor operating in the area for the past twelve years. With the help of a trucker, Dean identifies a gas station clerk Marlon as a participant in the abduction. Marlon reveals that the kidnapped victims are butchered and their parts sold online to monsters by the Butterfly. Clegg is revealed to be the Butterfly and kidnaps Sam in order to sell off his parts to monsters. Marlon is revealed to be a vampire and turns Doug into one as well. Dean and Donna are able to use Marlon's blood to cure Doug and force Marlon to give up Clegg's location before killing him. Donna rescues Wendy and kills Clegg's accomplice while Dean kills Clegg in time to save Sam's life. In the aftermath, Doug is terrified by the discovery of the world of monsters and breaks up with Donna. Sam displays a bleak outlook on life, believing that the Winchesters and anyone they get close to will suffer a terrible end.
| 276 | 12 | "Various & Sundry Villains" | Amanda Tapping | Steve Yockey | February 1, 2018 | T13.20562 | 1.68 |
Dean falls under a love spell cast by Jaime Plum, a witch working with her sister Jennie to steal the Black Grimoire, the spell book the Winchesters took from the Loughlin Family. Though the Plums succeed in stealing the book, Rowena unexpectedly shows up to help despite having been believed dead for months. Rowena reveals that she was resurrected again by the precautionary spell she put in place, but took a very long time to recover from her death. Rowena is seeking the Black Grimoire as it contains a ritual that will allow her to remove the magical binding placed upon her by the Grand Coven and regain her full powers. Privately, Rowena admits to Sam that she saw Lucifer's true face and she is terrified of his inevitable return. After stealing the Black Grimorie, the Plums attempt to use it to resurrect their deceased mother, but only succeed in bringing her back as a zombie. Together the Winchesters and Rowena defeat the Plums and recover the Black Grimoire. Though the Winchesters keep the book, a sympathetic Sam allows Rowena to take the page with the ritual she needs and Rowena is able to restore her full powers. At the same time, Castiel and Lucifer form an alliance to escape Asmodeus' custody. Though they succeed, Castiel refuses to trust Lucifer or give up some of his grace to him. Castiel attacks Lucifer with an angel blade, causing him harm in his weakened state.
| 277 | 13 | "Devil's Bargain" | Eduardo Sánchez | Eugenie Ross-Leming & Brad Buckner | February 8, 2018 | T13.20563 | 1.81 |
Following his confrontation with Lucifer, a wounded Castiel makes his way back to the Winchesters and informs them of everything that has happened including Lucifer's return. The Winchesters realize that the demon tablet could potentially contain the spell the alternate Kevin Tran used to reopen the rift, and they set Prophet Donatello Redfield to work on translating it. Learning of Donatello's work, Asmodeus places Donatello hypnotically under his control with an order to let him know once the spell is translated. With Lucifer becoming more human, he begins draining other angels' graces in an effort to restore his own. Along the way, Lucifer meets the angel Anael, disguised as a faith healer named Sister Jo. Lucifer and Anael form a connection while the Winchesters and Arthur Ketch, working for Asmodeus, hunt for Lucifer. Lucifer and Anael are able to avoid Arthur's attempt to kill them. Lucifer, with a promise to help make new angels and to restore the living angels' wings, becomes the ruler of Heaven again with Anael at his side. Following Lucifer's escape, Arthur proposes an alliance between himself and the Winchesters to defeat Lucifer and Michael's upcoming invasion, revealing his work for Asmodeus in the process. The Winchesters reluctantly concede that they need Arthur for now and are unaware of Donatello being under the control of Asmodeus as he translates the spell. When Arthur reports his failure to Asmodeus, Asmodeus reveals that he has acquired an Archangel Blade, the one weapon that can kill Lucifer. After Arthur points out that the Archangel Blade only works in the hands of another archangel, Asmodeus reveals that he has taken prisoner the Archangel Gabriel, who has been believed dead for nearly eight years.
| 278 | 14 | "Good Intentions" | P. J. Pesce | Meredith Glynn | March 1, 2018 | T13.20564 | 1.61 |
While reading the demon tablet, Prophet Donatello Redfield, due to his soulless state, becomes corrupted by its power. As a result, he gives the Winchesters and Castiel what he claims is the ingredients to open the rift before attacking Sam who manages to subdue him. Donatello sends Dean and Castiel after Gog and Magog in an attempt to kill them, but the attempt fails. With Donatello refusing to help, Castiel forcefully strips the information from his mind, leaving Donatello brain dead. Castiel justifies that they are fighting a war for their very survival, revealing that they need the grace of an archangel, a fruit from the Tree of Life, the seal of Solomon and the blood of a most holy man. In the Apocalypse World, Zachariah (Chad Rook) tries and fails to trick Jack into helping the angels. Working together, Jack and Mary escape Michael's fortress and are taken by Bobby Singer (Jim Beaver) to one of the few human colonies left. Bobby reveals to Mary the history of Apocalypse World and the war of extermination the angels are waging, causing Mary to realize that her own alternate self created this world by not making the deal with Azazel and having Sam and Dean. Jack is ordered exiled once his true nature is discovered, but Zachariah leads an attack on the colony before he can leave. Jack kills Zachariah and helps repel the attack on the colony, earning him acceptance. Having grown to care for the humans of Apocalypse World, Jack decides to kill Michael in order to end his war of extermination and save what's left of the human race.
| 279 | 15 | "A Most Holy Man" | Amanda Tapping | Robert Singer & Andrew Dabb | March 8, 2018 | T13.20565 | 1.66 |
The Winchesters realize that the blood of a most holy man likely refers to a saint and set out to find someone who has saint blood. Through a black market dealer named Margaret Astor, the Winchesters are directed to a man named Richard Greenstreet who claims to have saint's blood. Greenstreet offers to give the Winchesters the blood of Saint Ignatius if they get him the skull of Saint Peter which has recently been stolen from a monastery in Malta by a man working for Seattle mob boss Santino Scarpatti. After discovering the thief murdered, the Winchesters are apprehended by Scarpatti's henchmen, and Scarpatti offers a deal where he will pay them a handsome finder's fee that they can buy the blood with if they get him the skull. Complicating matters, the Winchesters meet Father Lucca Camilleri, a priest from Malta seeking the skull for altruistic reasons. The Winchesters choose to help Lucca and discover that Margaret Astor had murdered the thief to auction the skull off to everyone interested. Sam joins the auction, but Greenstreet instigates a gunfight that kills Margaret, Scarpatti and their henchmen. During the fight, Lucca saves Dean's life and the Winchesters learn that Greenstreet lied about having the saint's blood. Greenstreet is arrested while Lucca returns home with the skull. Before Lucca leaves, Sam learns that he is an apostolic protonotary supernumery, a title given by the Pope for doing good works. As a result, Lucca was declared "a most holy man" by the Pope and at the Winchesters' request, gives them his blood. Afterwards, Dean displays faith for the first time that they will succeed.
| 280 | 16 | "Scoobynatural" | Robert Singer | Jim Krieg & Jeremy Adams | March 29, 2018 | T13.20566 | 2.03 |
After the Winchesters stop a plushie that comes to life and attacks in a pawn shop, the grateful owner gives Dean a new TV for free. While testing out the TV, the Winchesters are sucked into Dean's favorite episode ("A Night of Fright Is No Delight") of Scooby-Doo, Where Are You! followed soon after by Castiel. To the group's shock, they discover an actual ghost that begins killing people, and the hunters and the Scooby Gang are forced to team up together to stop it. Working together, the Winchesters, Castiel, and the Scooby Gang trap the ghost, who reveals himself to be a young boy being used by a greedy real estate developer in the real world to scare away reluctant shop owners. The ghost helps the Winchesters and Castiel fool the Scooby Gang into thinking that it was a human villain before returning the Winchesters and Castiel to the real world. There, the three put the ghost to rest and get the criminal arrested for tax evasion. Before getting sucked into Scooby-Doo, Castiel is shown to have gotten the fruit from the Tree of Life, bringing the Winchesters one step closer to their goal of opening a portal to Apocalypse World. This episode is a crossover with Scooby-Doo.
| 281 | 17 | "The Thing" | John F. Showalter | Davy Perez | April 5, 2018 | T13.20567 | 1.41 |
Having gotten two of the needed ingredients to open a portal to Apocalypse World, the Winchesters search through the Men of Letters archive for clues on the Seal of Solomon. Finally, Dean discovers records showing that the Men of Letters found King Solomon's treasure in Palestine in 1917, including the Seal, and stored it in their Portsmouth, Rhode Island chapter house. The Winchesters are able to locate the chapter house. They find a young woman inside named Sandy Porter who has been trapped since 1925 and hasn't aged at all. Following an attack by a mysterious group, Sam learns that in 1925, a rogue Man of Letters named Diego Avila opened a rift into another dimension and brought forth the god Yokoth to cleanse the Earth. Sandy is in fact Yokoth who intends to bring her mate to Earth in Dean's body, and the group that attacked are Men of Letters legacies who have been keeping Yokoth trapped. With the help of Diego's great-grandchildren, the Winchesters banish Yokoth back to her dimension and get the Seal of Solomon. At the same time, Arthur Ketch discovers Asmodeus using Gabriel's grace to power up. Asmodeus recognizes that Arthur seeks redemption and brutally beats him. In retaliation, Arthur escapes with a frightened Gabriel and steals the archangel blade, bringing both to the Winchesters. Now having all the ingredients they need, the Winchesters open a door to Apocalypse World that will last twenty-four hours, and Dean and Arthur pass through to finally rescue Jack and Mary while Sam reluctantly stays behind to watch Gabriel.
| 282 | 18 | "Bring 'em Back Alive" | Amyn Kaderali | Brad Buckner & Eugenie Ross-Leming | April 12, 2018 | T13.20568 | 1.53 |
In Apocalypse World, Dean reluctantly works with Arthur Ketch to find Mary and Jack. To Dean's shock, he witnesses a group of angels holding the alternate reality version of his old friend Charlie Bradbury captive. Against Arthur's wishes, Dean launches a rescue mission for Charlie. Dean reveals that he still holds guilt over his Charlie's murder and Arthur agrees to help him. The pair rescue Charlie, who reveals that Mary and Jack are leading a resistance against Michael. Out of time before the rift closes, Dean returns to his Earth while Arthur remains behind in Apocalypse World to aid the resistance and coordinate for Dean's inevitable return with reinforcements. At the same time, Sam and Castiel attempt to help Gabriel, learning that he faked his death when Lucifer "killed" him in order to escape all responsibility again. Asmodeus eventually locates Gabriel and leads an attack on the bunker to recapture him. However, Gabriel recovers and kills Asmodeus who proves to be no match for the weakened archangel. Gabriel chooses to abscond from his responsibility once again and departs, leaving the Winchesters without Gabriel's power to fight Michael or his grace to reopen the door to Apocalypse World. At the same time, Lucifer struggles in his new role as the ruler of Heaven, ultimately alienating Anael with his behavior.
| 283 | 19 | "Funeralia" | Nina Lopez-Corrado | Steve Yockey | April 19, 2018 | T13.20569 | 1.38 |
In an effort to find Gabriel, Castiel visits Heaven to gain the help of the angels. To Castiel's shock, he is greeted by Naomi who has been believed dead since the fall of the angels nearly five years earlier. Naomi reveals she survived, but her injuries were such that she faked her death and has required years to recover. With Heaven experiencing power fluctuations, Naomi explains that there are now less than a dozen angels left, Naomi and Castiel included. Heaven will soon crumble and release its souls upon the Earth while the angels will burn out if Gabriel, their only chance, is not found and brought back to Heaven. After Castiel leaves, Naomi seals the portal until the situation is resolved. At the same time, the Winchesters learn that Rowena is using her new powers to kill both humans and Reapers and alter fate. Rowena is revealed to be trying to force Billie to bring back Crowley due to her remorse over the life he was forced to lead when she abandoned him. Rowena proves unable to kill Sam and weakens her power in a futile attack on Billie who offers sympathy, but refuses to bring Crowley back. The Winchesters become convinced that Rowena may be able to find redemption for her actions and she agrees to join them. It is also revealed that Sam is destined to be Rowena's final killer.
| 284 | 20 | "Unfinished Business" | Richard Speight Jr. | Meredith Glynn | April 26, 2018 | T13.20570 | 1.51 |
In Apocalypse World, Mary and Jack's resistance has had a string of victories against Michael and his angels, causing Jack to become overconfident in his abilities. The two receive the unexpected news that Michael's fortress has been cleared out; while searching it with a few resistance fighters, they discover Kevin Tran in the dungeon. Kevin reveals that he has perfected the spell from the angel tablet to open the rift between the worlds and Michael is preparing to use it to lead an army to the Winchesters world. Kevin reveals that he has been left behind as a trap by Michael. He kills himself in an explosion that kills all but Jack and Mary, leaving Jack dispirited as Michael wanted. At the same time, Gabriel is seriously injured while killing the Norse god Fenrir. Gabriel, low on power, asks the Winchesters for help with getting revenge against Loki who, along with his sons Fenrir, Narfi and Sleipnir, had sold Gabriel to Asmodeus when Gabriel sought their help. With the help of the Winchesters, who agree to help him in exchange for some of his grace, Gabriel kills Narfi and Sleipnir. He then faces off with Loki who is revealed to have made a deal with Gabriel for Gabriel to assume Loki's identity in exchange for Gabriel leaving Loki's family out of the angels' conflict. Loki is furious because Lucifer killed Odin years earlier and he blames Gabriel for the death of his father. Gabriel kills Loki and agrees to help the Winchesters against Michael, as promised. While the Winchesters only have to wait for Gabriel's grace to recharge to open the portal again, Dean is revealed to have been overprotecting Sam out of fear of losing him again, causing Sam to confront Dean.
| 285 | 21 | "Beat the Devil" | Phil Sgriccia | Robert Berens | May 3, 2018 | T13.20571 | 1.39 |
With Gabriel unable to supply the needed grace to open a rift to Apocalypse World, Sam decides to capture Lucifer and use his grace as a continuous power source to keep the rift open. Working together, Gabriel and Rowena succeed in capturing Lucifer. The Winchesters, Castiel and Gabriel then travel through the rift to Apocalypse World. However, after learning that his son is in Apocalypse World, Lucifer eventually breaks free and travels through the rift, leaving Rowena to scramble to find a way to keep it open without Lucifer to power it. In Apocalypse World, the Winchesters rescue two refugees from bestial vampires and learn that the only way to Mary and Jack's camp is through a tunnel full of the creatures. Though Dean, Castiel, Gabriel, and one of the refugees, Maggie, make it, Sam is killed by the vampires in the process. A grief-stricken Dean, Castiel and Gabriel are finally reunited with Mary and Jack in their camp in the ruins of Dayton, Ohio while Sam is unexpectedly resurrected by a recharged Lucifer. Lucifer requests Sam's help in building a relationship with Jack and insists that they need his help to defeat Michael. Sam reluctantly leads Lucifer to the camp where Lucifer meets his son for the first time.
| 286 | 22 | "Exodus" | Thomas J. Wright | Eugenie Ross-Leming & Brad Buckner | May 10, 2018 | T13.20572 | 1.30 |
Despite the objections of the Winchesters, Jack agrees to hear Lucifer out and is fascinated by Lucifer, forming a bond with him. With Mary unwilling to abandon the people she has come to care about and only thirty-one hours left, Sam and Dean suggest evacuating the people through the rift to their world until they can come up with a plan to defeat Michael once and for all. After a vote, the resistance all agree to evacuate, including Bobby Singer. However, Arthur Ketch and Charlie Bradbury fall into an angel trap and are captured before the exodus can begin. As the angels bring in an evil Castiel to torture them for information, the Winchesters, Jack and Castiel launch a rescue mission. They succeed in rescuing the two and Castiel kills his evil counterpart. As Rowena struggles to hold the rift open, everyone begins passing through it, only for Michael to arrive with Sam and Dean finally meeting him. Michael defeats Lucifer and kills Gabriel when they try to hold Michael off and Sam purposefully strands Lucifer on Apocalypse World. As everyone celebrates in the bunker, Lucifer and Michael form an alliance to reopen the rift and conquer the world.
| 287 | 23 | "Let the Good Times Roll" | Robert Singer | Andrew Dabb | May 17, 2018 | T13.20573 | 1.63 |
As the refugees from Apocalypse World start to settle in and the Winchesters resume hunting alongside Jack and Castiel, one of the Apocalypse World refugees, Maggie, turns up dead. Shortly afterwards, Jack is greeted by Lucifer who tries to convince him that they should leave the Earth to find a new life together out amongst the stars. Jack gets Lucifer to resurrect Maggie who later identifies Lucifer as her killer. At the same time, Michael appears and attacks the Winchesters and Castiel, all of whom barely escape. With the bunker under attack, Mary and Bobby Singer flee as Sam prays to Jack for help. Jack arrives and severely injures Michael before Lucifer's actions are revealed. Only wanting his son's power, Lucifer steals Jack's grace, leaving Jack human before teleporting to a church with Jack and Sam. With Lucifer now virtually unstoppable, Dean makes a deal with Michael where he will become Michael's vessel to fight Lucifer but Dean will remain in control. Powered by Michael, Dean fights Lucifer, ending with Dean finally killing Lucifer with the Archangel Blade. Before the group can celebrate, Michael breaks the deal, takes full control of Dean, and departs, leaving Sam, Jack, Castiel, Mary, and Bobby in shock.

== Production ==
Supernatural was renewed for a thirteenth season by The CW on January 8, 2017. This season is the first season not to feature Mark A. Sheppard as Crowley since his introduction in the fifth season, as the actor announced in May 2017 he would not be returning after his character was killed off for the last time. Alexander Calvert, who was introduced as Jack in the twelfth-season finale, was promoted to series regular for this season.

== Reception ==
The review aggregator website Rotten Tomatoes reports a 100% approval rating for Supernatural's thirteenth season, with an average rating of 7.9/10 based on 7 reviews.

=== Ratings ===
Viewership and ratings per episode of Supernatural season 13
| No. | Title | Air date | Rating/share (18–49) | Viewers (millions) | DVR (18–49) | DVR viewers (millions) | Total (18–49) | Total viewers (millions) |
|---|---|---|---|---|---|---|---|---|
| 1 | "Lost and Found" | October 12, 2017 | 0.7/3 | 2.10 | —N/a | —N/a | —N/a | —N/a |
| 2 | "The Rising Son" | October 19, 2017 | 0.7/3 | 1.90 | —N/a | —N/a | —N/a | —N/a |
| 3 | "Patience" | October 26, 2017 | 0.6/2 | 1.93 | —N/a | —N/a | —N/a | —N/a |
| 4 | "The Big Empty" | November 2, 2017 | 0.6/2 | 1.82 | 0.5 | —N/a | 1.1 | —N/a |
| 5 | "Advanced Thanatology" | November 9, 2017 | 0.6/2 | 1.71 | —N/a | —N/a | —N/a | —N/a |
| 6 | "Tombstone" | November 16, 2017 | 0.7/3 | 1.89 | —N/a | —N/a | —N/a | —N/a |
| 7 | "War of the Worlds" | November 23, 2017 | 0.3/1 | 1.24 | 0.5 | 1.21 | 0.8 | 2.45 |
| 8 | "The Scorpion and the Frog" | November 30, 2017 | 0.6/2 | 1.73 | —N/a | —N/a | —N/a | —N/a |
| 9 | "The Bad Place" | December 7, 2017 | 0.6/2 | 1.74 | —N/a | —N/a | —N/a | —N/a |
| 10 | "Wayward Sisters" | January 18, 2018 | 0.6/2 | 1.85 | 0.4 | —N/a | 1.0 | —N/a |
| 11 | "Breakdown" | January 25, 2018 | 0.6/2 | 1.93 | 0.5 | 1.10 | 1.1 | 3.03 |
| 12 | "Various & Sundry Villains" | February 1, 2018 | 0.6/2 | 1.68 | 0.4 | 0.94 | 1.0 | 2.62 |
| 13 | "Devil's Bargain" | February 8, 2018 | 0.6/2 | 1.81 | 0.4 | 1.08 | 1.0 | 2.89 |
| 14 | "Good Intentions" | March 1, 2018 | 0.6/2 | 1.61 | —N/a | 0.97 | —N/a | 2.59 |
| 15 | "A Most Holy Man" | March 8, 2018 | 0.5/2 | 1.66 | 0.4 | 1.05 | 0.9 | 2.73 |
| 16 | "Scoobynatural" | March 29, 2018 | 0.7/3 | 2.03 | 0.6 | 1.32 | 1.3 | 3.36 |
| 17 | "The Thing" | April 5, 2018 | 0.4/2 | 1.41 | 0.4 | 0.97 | 0.8 | 2.41 |
| 18 | "Bring 'em Back Alive" | April 12, 2018 | 0.5/2 | 1.53 | 0.4 | 0.98 | 0.9 | 2.51 |
| 19 | "Funeralia" | April 19, 2018 | 0.5/2 | 1.38 | 0.4 | 0.95 | 0.9 | 2.36 |
| 20 | "Unfinished Business" | April 26, 2018 | 0.5/2 | 1.51 | 0.4 | 0.99 | 0.9 | 2.49 |
| 21 | "Beat the Devil" | May 3, 2018 | 0.4/2 | 1.39 | 0.4 | 0.94 | 0.8 | 2.33 |
| 22 | "Exodus" | May 10, 2018 | 0.4/2 | 1.30 | 0.4 | 0.85 | 0.8 | 2.20 |
| 23 | "Let the Good Times Roll" | May 17, 2018 | 0.5/2 | 1.63 | 0.4 | 0.87 | 0.9 | 2.50 |
