= Nick Vincent Murphy =

Irish screenwriter and novelist

- Occupations: Screenwriter; novelist

Nick Vincent Murphy (born 23 October 1977) is an Irish screenwriter and novelist. He is best known for his work on the TV comedy series Moone Boy (2012–15), the Moone Boy novels, the animated series Dorg Van Dango (2020–21), and the feature film Hideaways (2011).

== Personal life ==
Murphy was born and raised in Kilkenny, Ireland. He was educated at Kilkenny College and then studied English and History at Trinity College Dublin (1996–2000) and was very active in the drama society Players. In 2001 he did a Master's in Film Production at Dublin Institute of Technology where he met Vicki Parks whom he later married. They have two sons.

== Career ==
While at university he directed several theatre productions including Arthur Miller's Death Of A Salesman, which was later staged at the Dublin Fringe Festival in 1999, produced by the actor Chris O'Dowd, the first of many collaborations between the pair.

In 2001, he wrote and directed his first short film Waiting Room while studying at Dublin Institute of Technology. That year he also won a National Student Drama Award for Best Film Script for Dead Leg, which he co-wrote with his brother Luke. He worked as a staff writer on the TV3 series The Offside Show (2005), and directed and edited a short documentary, Big Massive Protest (2007). He was a co-writer of the acclaimed TG4 drama series The Running Mate, which won Best Single Drama at the 2008 Irish Film and Television Awards and was also nominated for Best Television Script.

In 2010 his first feature film, Hideaways (2011) was produced in Ireland. The French/Irish/Swedish co-production was directed by Agnès Merlet, produced by Jean Luc Ormières, and featured actors Rachel Hurd-Wood and Harry Treadaway. It premiered at the Tribeca Film Festival before being released in cinemas across France in 2011. It won the Méliès d’Argent award for best European film at the Strasbourg Film Festival.

In 2010 he and Chris O'Dowd co-wrote a short film "Capturing Santa" as part of the Little Crackers series for Sky 1. Based on an incident from O'Dowd's childhood, it was directed by Peter Cattaneo and starred O'Dowd and Sharon Horgan. It has since been screened at film festivals around the world, including the New York International Children's Film Festival 2012 where it won the Grand Prize Short Film and the Audience Award Ages 8–14.

Following interest from Sky, O'Dowd and Murphy developed the short film into a comedy series called Moone Boy about a boy called Martin Moone and his family who live in Boyle, County Roscommon. Inspired by events from O'Dowd's childhood, they co-wrote six episodes which went into production in 2012, directed by Declan Lowney.

Several months before the first series aired, Sky ordered a second series of Moone Boy. O'Dowd and Murphy co-wrote five episodes, with Murphy writing one episode alone, Ghost Raft. The second series went into production six months after the first season wrapped, and was directed by Ian Fitzgibbon.

The first series aired on Sky 1 in September 2012. It went on to win Best Comedy at the International Emmy Awards 2013 and Best Entertainment Programme at the Irish Film and Television Awards. It was nominated for a total of five IFTAs in 2013, including Best Script, and was nominated for two British Comedy Awards. It picked up another six IFTA nominations in 2014, winning Best Director and Best Entertainment Programme.

A third series of Moone Boy went into production in the summer of 2013. O'Dowd and Murphy co-wrote all six episodes, and the series was directed by Chris O'Dowd. Moone Boy went on to pick up a BAFTA nomination for Best Scripted Comedy, and won Best Sitcom at the 2014 British Comedy Awards.

In December 2013, it was announced by Macmillan that O'Dowd and Murphy would be writing two children's books based on their award-winning series. Moone Boy: The Blunder Years, the first book, was published in October 2014. It was described as "wildly entertaining" by The New York Times and won the Senior Children's Book of the Year at the Irish Book Awards. The follow-up novel, Moone Boy: The Fish Detective was published on 16 October (the birthday of Martin Moone) in 2015. They published two more books, Moone Boy: The Marvellous Activity Manual in 2016 and Moone Boy: The Notion Potion in 2017.

In 2014, Nick worked with the British animation company, Aardman Animations and co-wrote Shaun the Sheep: The Farmer's Llamas. The 30-minute special won the International Emmy 2016 for Best Kids Animation.

In 2017, Nick worked with the Irish animation studio, Cartoon Saloon and Canadian studio Wildbrain to develop the animated series, Dorg Van Dango. The series went into production in 2019 and Nick served as Head Writer/Executive Story Editor, leading a team of 19 writers in 4 countries across a total of 52 episodes. The series started airing internationally in 2020.

In 2019, he worked on the British science-fiction drama series Intergalactic, co-writing episode 4, which aired in 2021.
