= Supernatural season 14 =

Season of television series

Supernatural
- Season 14
- DVD cover art
- Showrunners: Andrew Dabb; Robert Singer
- Starring: Jared Padalecki; Jensen Ackles; Mark Pellegrino; Alexander Calvert; Misha Collins
- No. of episodes: 20

Release
- Original network: The CW
- Original release: October 11, 2018 – April 25, 2019

Season chronology
- ← Previous; Season 13 Next → Season 15

The fourteenth season of Supernatural, an American dark fantasy television series created by Eric Kripke, premiered on October 11, 2018, on The CW, and concluded on April 25, 2019. The season consists of 20 episodes and aired on Thursdays at 8:00 pm (ET). This is the third season with Andrew Dabb and Robert Singer as showrunners.

The thirteenth episode of the season marks the 300th episode of the series. The season follows Sam and Dean who, along with Jack and Castiel, try to take down the archangel Michael from another world, and learn something bigger is at hand.

== Cast ==
=== Starring ===
- Jared Padalecki as Sam Winchester
- Jensen Ackles as Dean Winchester / Michael
- Mark Pellegrino as Nick / Lucifer (Note: Only credited for their respective episode appearances.)
- Alexander Calvert as Jack Kline
- Misha Collins as Castiel

=== Special guest stars ===
- Jim Beaver as Bobby Singer
- DJ Qualls as Garth Fitzgerald IV
- Jeffrey Dean Morgan as John Winchester

=== Guest stars ===
- Samantha Smith as Mary Winchester
- Danneel Ackles as Sister Jo / Anael
- Katherine Evans as Maggie
- Dean Armstrong as Kip
- Meganne Young as Lydia Crawford
- Kim Rhodes as Sheriff Jody Mills
- Yadira Guevara-Prip as Kaia Nieves
- Genevieve Buechner as Samantha Juarez
- Aaron Paul Stewart as Dirk Winchell
- Kurt Ostlund as Stuart Blake
- Leah Cairns as Sasha Rawling
- Chris Patrick-Simpson as Neil
- Thomas Nicholson as Daniel Singer
- Maddie Phillips as Harper Sayles
- Felicia Day as Charlie Bradbury
- Ruth Connell as Rowena MacLeod
- Dimitri Vantis as Sergei / Shaman
- Erica Cerra as Dumah / The Shadow
- Veronica Cartwright as Lily Sunder
- Amanda Tapping as Naomi
- Courtney Ford as Kelly Kline
- David Haydn-Jones as Arthur Ketch
- Felisha Terrell as Michael
- Traci Dinwiddie as Pamela Barnes
- Lisa Berry as Billie / Death
- Briana Buckmaster as Sheriff Donna Hanscum
- Nelson Leis as Jeff / Abraxas
- Keith Szarabajka as Donatello Redfield
- Kurt Fuller as Zachariah
- Skylar Radzion as Max
- Zenia Marshall as Stacy
- Cory Grüter-Andrew as Eliot
- Philippe Bowgen as Noah Ophis
- Caitlin Ashley-Thompson as Sunny Harrington
- Bill Dow as Chip Harrington
- Kimberley Shoniker as Cindy Smith
- Phillip Lewitski as Tom Romero
- Adam Beach as Sheriff Mason Romero
- Chilton Crane as Mrs. Kline
- Rob Benedict as Chuck Shurley / God
- Catherine Lough Haggquist as Jules

== Episodes ==
No. overall	No. in season	Title	Directed by	Written by	Original release date	Prod. code	U.S. viewers (millions)
288	1	"Stranger in a Strange Land"	Thomas J. Wright	Andrew Dabb	October 11, 2018	T13.21151	1.49
In the weeks since his possession of Dean, Michael has begun visiting various people and asking the question "what do you want?" while he tries to figure out the answer in regards to himself. One of these people is the angel Anael who has returned to life on Earth following Lucifer's departure from Heaven. Anael later calls Sam to warn him of Michael allying with vampires. Meanwhile, Jack is struggling to adapt to life as a human without his powers and is trained by Bobby Singer without much success. Sam is the leader of a new hunter network and runs himself ragged in search of Dean. Sam learns from Lucifer's former vessel Nick, who survived Lucifer's death, that Michael plans to "do it right this time," but nothing else. In an attempt to find Dean, Castiel meets with the demon Kip, who ambushes Castiel in hopes of making a deal with Sam to become the new King of Hell. After a massive brawl, Sam kills Kip and makes it clear to the remaining demons that there will be no more Kings of Hell. The demons then flee in fear.
289	2	"Gods and Monsters"	Richard Speight Jr.	Brad Buckner & Eugenie Ross-Leming	October 18, 2018	T13.21152	1.53
Still struggling without his powers, Jack visits his grandparents to find a familial connection. He learns more about his mother, but can't bring himself to tell his grandparents who he is or that Kelly is dead. Nick becomes more aggressive and begins to display Lucifer-like behaviors, causing Castiel to suspect that Lucifer did more damage to Nick's psyche than was thought. Learning that the brutal murders of his wife and infant son were never solved, Nick sets out to get revenge. Nick visits his old neighbor Arty, the only witness, for answers. After learning what he knows, Nick kills Arty with a hammer, the same way that his family was murdered. Michael performs experiments on enhancing monsters using angel grace, burning out a nest of vampires in the process. Michael's experiments draw the attention of Sam, Bobby, and Mary Winchester, who investigate while Michael makes a deal with a pack of werewolves to build an army of monsters and wipe out the human race. Michael's enhanced werewolves attack the hunters and prove to be immune to silver, but not decapitation. After the fight, Dean suddenly arrives with Michael no longer possessing his body, having left on his own.
290	3	"The Scar"	Robert Singer	Robert Berens	October 25, 2018	T13.21153	1.39
To understand why Michael left Dean's body, Castiel locates a memory of Michael being attacked by a hooded figure with a spear that the Winchesters recognize as Kaia Nieves' killer from The Bad Place. The Winchesters team up with Jody Mills, who has been investigating a series of murders where the victims, revealed to be Michael's enhanced monsters, all have scars that match the one on Dean’s arm from the spear. The Winchesters and Jody capture the hooded figure, who they realize is Kaia's Bad Place doppelgänger. She is also a dreamwalker and has been sharing visions with their Kaia her whole life. When Michael's enhanced vampires attack, Kaia saves their lives and departs with the spear. Dean confesses to Sam that he blames himself for Michael's rampage. Jack, feeling useless without his powers, tries to leave the bunker but takes interest in a young woman named Lora rescued from a witch who is inexplicably aging to death. Though Lora dies, Jack pieces together clues she told him about the witch's actions to restore her life force. Castiel congratulates Jack for saving Lora without his powers and Jack hides the fact that he is now coughing up blood.
291	4	"Mint Condition"	Amyn Kaderali	Davy Perez	November 1, 2018	T13.21154	1.46
On Halloween, Sam pulls Dean out of his room, where he's been hiding out and watching scary movies, to investigate a case in Salem, Ohio where an action figure came to life and attacked its owner, Stuart. After both Stuart and Dean are attacked by an invisible figure with a chainsaw, its determined that they are dealing with the vengeful spirit of a comic shop owner who is angry at Stuart for always stealing from the shop. Possessing a life-sized figure of Dean's favorite horror movie character, David Yaeger, the ghost attacks Dean in the hospital where he is protecting Stuart. Sam manages to destroy the ghost and later reveals that he hates Halloween because of a traumatic event in his childhood where he was embarrassed in front of a girl he liked. At the hospital, a security guard notices the lights flickering and the action figure recites his "trick or treat" catch-phrase, suggesting that the ghost may not be really gone.
292	5	"Nightmare Logic"	Darren Grant	Meredith Glynn	November 8, 2018	T13.21155	1.43
While working her first solo case, Maggie disappears. From her body camera, Sam and Dean learn that Maggie was ambushed by what appeared to be a ghoul. Investigating, they find that their mother and Bobby are investigating the same case. The four discover the body of another hunter and manifestations that make them suspect that the owner of the house, who is comatose following an apparent stroke, is a psychic who is bending reality around him. As Sam rescues Maggie from the attic and Mary and Bobby face a manifestation of Bobby's dead son Daniel in the woods, Dean realizes that the home owner's nurse Neil is a djinn, enhanced by Michael's experiments. Neil reveals that he was left as a trap for hunters by Michael and that there are dozens of similar traps all over the place. After mysteriously proving immune to Neil's powers, Dean is able to kill him, ending Neil's manifestations. Sam and Dean spread the word to other hunters while Bobby tells Mary how since he lost Daniel, hunting is all he's had. Mary and Bobby take a sabbatical at Donna Hanscum's cabin for Bobby to heal and to find something else to live for.
293	6	"Optimism"	Richard Speight Jr.	Steve Yockey	November 15, 2018	T13.21156	1.48
Jack convinces Dean to work the case of a young man mysteriously murdered in McCook, Nebraska with him. Dean and Jack discover that the local librarian, Harper Sayles, has a bad history with men and suspect her to be cursed. The culprit turns out to be Harper's old boyfriend Vance who is a zombie while Harper is the necromancer that resurrected him and targets her potential boyfriends to feed Vance. Dean and Jack manage to kill Vance, but Harper escapes and develops an obsession with Jack. The case convinces Dean to give Jack a chance at being a hunter. At the same time, Sam works a case with Charlie Bradbury in Memphis, Tennessee. The two determine that they are dealing with a rogue insectoid monster known as a musca and kill the monster, rescuing its latest victim. Throughout the hunt, Charlie reveals many of the differences between her and the Charlie that the Winchesters once knew and expresses a desire to leave hunting after the case and go off on her own. Sam convinces Charlie to reconsider leaving. During the episode, Jack's strange cough persists. At the end, Jack coughs up blood in front of Dean before suddenly collapsing, bleeding from his nose and mouth.
294	7	"Unhuman Nature"	John F. Showalter	Eugenie Ross-Leming & Brad Buckner	November 29, 2018	T13.21157	1.49
Rowena determines that Jack's condition is a result of his human and angel sides attacking each other without his grace maintaining a balance. Sam decides to contact a shaman named Sergei for help while Jack decides to live the remainder of his life to the fullest with the help of Dean, who teaches Jack to drive and fish while secretly displaying mysterious dizzy spells. Sergei provides Castiel with some of Gabriel's grace and a spell to fix Jack's condition in exchange for the Winchesters owing him a favor. Rowena performs the spell, but Jack only grows worse with Sergei telling Castiel that it was an experiment. Rowena proclaims that there is nothing more they can do for Jack but be there for him as he dies. Based on the information he learned from his former neighbor Arty, Nick tracks down a former cop named Frank Kellogg and tortures him for information about his family's murders. Frank reveals that he murdered Nick's family after encountering a man named Abraxas, who Nick realizes was a demon who had possessed Frank to commit the murders. Nick then bludgeons Frank to death with a hammer. Having realized he enjoyed being Lucifer's vessel, Nick prays to the archangel, causing a skeletal figure with red eyes to rise in the Empty.
295	8	"Byzantium"	Eduardo Sánchez	Meredith Glynn	December 6, 2018	T13.21158	1.53
Jack dies of his condition, leaving the Winchesters and Castiel in mourning. In an attempt to save Jack, Sam contacts angel expert Lily Sunder, now an old woman, who suggests that they can resurrect Jack and cure him with her magic which will use the power of Jack's own soul to sustain him. In return, Lily asks the Winchesters and Castiel to ensure her admittance into Heaven. Lily explains that she still has a piece of her soul left and she wants to get into Heaven to ensure that she will be reunited with her daughter. The Winchesters summon Anubis who determines that Lily will go to Hell and explains that the choices a person makes in life determines their ultimate fate. Despite this, Dean convinces Lily to help them. In Heaven, Jack is chased by a dark force and reunites with his mother. As part of their plan, Castiel travels into Heaven where he learns from Naomi that the entity from The Empty has come seeking Jack's soul. With the angels being consumed by the entity, Castiel locates Jack, only to come face to face with the entity. Castiel makes a deal with the entity to trade himself for Jack, a deal that the entity chooses not to collect upon until Castiel experiences a moment of true happiness. In thanks, Naomi provides Castiel with Michael's location. Castiel and Lily succeed in resurrecting Jack, but the effort causes Lily to suffer a fatal heart attack. Lily is judged worthy of Heaven by Anubis and is allowed to be reunited with her daughter at long last.
296	9	"The Spear"	Amyn Kaderali	Robert Berens	December 13, 2018	T13.21159	1.43
Having located the hyperbolic pulse generator, Arthur Ketch mails it to the Winchesters. At the same time, Garth goes undercover amongst Michael's monsters and discovers that Michael, now in a female vessel, has monsters ready to turn the entire population of Kansas City, Missouri into his monster army. Garth warns Sam, but is forced to accept Michael's enhancements. While Sam and Jack go after the hyperbolic pulse generator, Dean and Castiel go after Kaia who provides them with her spear in exchange for them helping her to return home to the Bad Place after Michael is defeated. At the same time, Michael destroys the hyperbolic pulse generator and abducts Jack. Sam is able to rescue Jack, but Garth falls under Michael's influence and attacks, forcing Sam to subdue him. Reunited, Sam, Dean, Jack and Castiel launch an attack on Michael with Kaia's spear. Dean appears about to kill Michael when the archangel suddenly repossesses him and destroys the weapon. Michael reveals that Dean had been fighting him so much that he allowed Dean to go in order to break Dean's spirit before using the crack he left in Dean's mind to repossess him. Michael triumphantly announces that Dean is gone and gives his army the signal to attack.
297	10	"Nihilism"	Amanda Tapping	Steve Yockey	January 17, 2019	T13.21160	1.44
Sam, Castiel and Jack manage to trap Michael using the angelic handcuffs, but he summons several monsters to rescue him. Sam attempts to get the Reaper Violet to transport them to safety and despite her protests, Sam, Castiel, Jack and Michael are suddenly teleported to the bunker where Sam gets word from Maggie that all of Michael's monsters have broken off their attack on Kansas City, Missouri and are headed for the bunker. Remembering how Crowley helped Sam kick Gadreel out of his mind, Sam and Castiel use the British Men of Letters mind-link device to enter Dean's mind and get him to cast Michael out while Jack remains behind to defend the bunker. Sam and Castiel find Dean living out a looped existence where he owns a bar with Pamela Barnes and is happy. After they succeed in getting Dean to remember the truth, Michael attacks and warns that Dean will die if he is forced out. Instead, Dean, Sam and Castiel trap Michael within Dean's mind. At the same time, several monsters attack the bunker and Jack draws on power from his soul to destroy them. After Michael is trapped, Michael's army seemingly disbands with Michael unable to control them anymore. Castiel warns Jack of the ramifications of using his soul in such a manner while Michael continues to struggle to break free of Dean's control. Dean is visited by Billie who reveals that she had rescued Sam and the others from Michael's monsters. Billie warns Dean that all versions of his fate but one now have Michael breaking free and using Dean to destroy the world. Billie shows Dean the one fate where Michael fails, leaving Dean shocked at what it reveals must be done.
298	11	"Damaged Goods"	Phil Sgriccia	Davy Perez	January 24, 2019	T13.21161	1.44
Acting strangely, Dean departs the bunker to visit Mary and Donna by himself and begins building something in Donna's cabin's workshop. Mary catches on and alerts Sam who travels to Hibbing, Minnesota to confront his brother. At the same time, Nick continues his bloody rampage of revenge by searching for Abraxas who he learns was captured by Mary Winchester while slaughtering a Girl Scout troop. Nick kidnaps Mary and forces her to lead him to a storage unit where Abraxas is trapped in an Enochian puzzle box. With the help of Donna, the Winchesters track down Nick as he releases Abraxas who possesses a security guard Nick kidnapped. Nick frees Abraxas from a devil's trap when confronted by the Winchesters and Abraxas reveals that he killed Nick's family on Lucifer's orders. Nick kills Abraxas with an angel blade, getting his revenge and is arrested by Donna for his murder spree. Nick justifies his actions as being necessary to avenge his family, while Sam apologizes for not being able to save him. Dean reveals to Sam that he built a box that can permanently contain even an archangel, as according to Billie it is the only way to stop Michael from escaping. Dean's plan is to trap himself with Michael for eternity at the bottom of the ocean, and Sam reluctantly agrees to help him.
299	12	"Prophet and Loss"	Thomas J. Wright	Brad Buckner & Eugenie Ross-Leming	January 31, 2019	T13.21162	1.40
Still in custody, Nick escapes and returns to his old house in Pike Creek, Delaware where Nick finds the ghost of his wife Sarah. Sarah reveals that she is trapped by Nick's inability to let go of Lucifer and the unfinished business it causes her. Nick remains unable to let Lucifer go, even to free his wife and departs to continue his search for the archangel. At the same time, Sam continues to attempt to talk Dean out of his plan while convincing him to take the case of a strange double murder in Fort Dodge, Iowa. Sam and Dean discover the killer to be a malformed Prophet Tony Alvarez, created by Donatello Redfield's current state between life and death. Believing that he hears the voice of God, Tony has been committing divine retributions before committing suicide when Sam and Dean catch him. To prevent further corruption of the Prophet line, the Winchesters and Castiel reluctantly decide that they must remove the brain dead Donatello from life support and end his life. However, it is discovered that Donatello's mind is attempting to rebuild itself which is what Tony actually heard. Castiel is able to awaken Donatello who remains soulless, but is no longer twisted and corrupted. Sam and Castiel succeed in convincing Dean to try to find another way, leaving his plan as a last resort instead.
300	13	"Lebanon"	Robert Singer	Andrew Dabb & Meredith Glynn	February 7, 2019	T13.21163	1.64
Investigating the murder of a hunter friend of theirs, Sam and Dean come into possession of a collection of occult items from a pawn shop, including a cigar box containing the ghost of John Wayne Gacy and a Chinese pearl that grants the holder's greatest wish. Dean attempts to use the pearl to get rid of Michael, but instead inadvertently summons John Winchester from 2003. While the Winchesters are initially thrilled to have their family reunited, the removal of John from 2003 alters the timeline, creating a world where Sam runs a law firm and is Internet famous, Dean is a wanted serial killer and Castiel is still an unquestioning and loyal soldier of Heaven. Castiel arrives in Lebanon, Kansas with Zachariah to investigate the changes to history, leading to a conflict which ends with Zachariah killed by Sam and Castiel banished. Though reluctant, the Winchester family decides that they must destroy the pearl and send John back to 2003 to prevent the new timeline from becoming a reality. After an emotional goodbye, John is returned to his own time, leaving him thinking that the experience was only a dream while history restores itself to normal.
301	14	"Ouroboros"	Amyn Kaderali	Steve Yockey	March 7, 2019	T13.21164	1.28
The Winchesters, Castiel, Jack and Rowena work together to hunt a monster paralyzing and eating people across multiple states. They eventually determine that they are dealing with a Gorgon who is unable to see Castiel and Jack with his clairvoyant powers as they are not human. Castiel and Jack attempt to ambush the gorgon, only to fail to defeat him. When the Winchesters intervene, Dean is knocked unconscious before Jack manages to kill the gorgon. Dean remains unconscious, leaving Jack to face the realities of being an immortal being. As Dean's family and friends try to find a way to help him, his state allows Michael to escape his mind and Michael forces Rowena to become his new vessel, brutally slaughtering several hunters. Tapping into the power of his soul, Jack manages to exorcise Michael from Rowena and destroys the archangel, absorbing his grace. Jack announces to his stunned friends that Michael is dead and Jack has regained his own powers, displaying his wings as proof.
302	15	"Peace of Mind"	Phil Sgriccia	Story by : Meghan Fitzmartin & Steve Yockey; Teleplay by : Meghan Fitzmartin	March 14, 2019	T13.21166	1.51
Troubled at Jack's recent transformation and worried about how much of his human soul is left after his battle with Michael, Dean takes Jack to talk with Donatello based on the prophet's own experience of losing his soul, while Sam and Castiel investigate a report of a man's head exploding. Tracing the victim back to his hometown, Sam and Castiel discover that the entire town is essentially stuck living in the fifties, with the accompanying fashions and moral attitudes, to the point that Sam falls under the influence and takes the dead man's place. With Castiel immune due to his angelic status, he determines that the culprit is the town mayor Chip Harrington, who used his psychic powers to force his image of an ideal existence on the rest of the town. Castiel is able to break Chip's influence over Sam and his daughter Sunny then traps Chip in his own mind where he will live out the rest of his life in his delusion. Meanwhile, Jack talks with Donatello, admitting that he isn't sure how much of his human soul is left, but Donatello encourages him to do as he does and judge his actions from a moral perspective based on the best men he knows. Jack declares Sam and Dean as his influence, but later kills the pet snake of the Gorgon, which he had taken as his own, so that it could be reunited with its master.
303	16	"Don't Go in the Woods"	John Fitzpatrick	Davy Perez & Nick Vaught	March 21, 2019	T13.21165	1.46
In Polk City, Iowa, a young couple is attacked by a monster which kills the girl. Sam discovers that there have been at least fifty-four disappearances in the area stretching back to 1943, but the Winchesters decide to leave Jack behind in the bunker. Sam and Dean discover that they are facing a legendary monster called a Kohonta which the local sheriff reveals is a man who was cursed by the Native Americans for engaging in cannibalism. The Winchesters and the sheriff kill the kohonta and manage to save the sheriff's son from it. Sam encourages the sheriff to tell his son the truth, still reeling from the loss of the hunters murdered by Michael. At the same time, Jack befriends the local kids who had learned the truth about the supernatural after encountering the ghost of infamous serial killer John Wayne Gacy. Jack's attempts to show off cause him to almost kill Stacy with an angel blade. Though Jack heals Stacy, Jack's antics scare off his new friends. Afterwards, the Winchesters admit the truth to Jack about why they left him behind, but Jack lies about what he did while they were gone.
304	17	"Game Night"	John F. Showalter	Meredith Glynn	April 4, 2019	T13.21167	1.25
Nick captures Donatello, supposedly poisoning him with thallium and forcing the Winchesters to reluctantly work with him to save their friend. Eventually, Nick gives up Donatello's location, but Jack realizes that Nick injected Donatello with angel grace instead. Nick reveals that he has been working with demons to resurrect Lucifer who is awake in the Empty due to Nick's prayer, boosting Donatello's Prophet abilities to reach the archangel who provided Nick with a ritual requiring Jack's blood. Nick seriously injures Sam and escapes while Dean kills the demons and rescues Donatello. As Nick opens a portal to the Empty and releases Lucifer, Jack and Mary rush to stop him; Jack banishes Lucifer back to the Empty and brutally kills Nick for his actions. Meanwhile, Castiel and Anael attempt to contact God for help restoring Jack's soul by tracking a man called Methuselah, who offered Joshua sanctuary after the Fall. Castiel finds the amulet and tries to contact God but nothing happens. With no other choice, Castiel plans to finally admit to the Winchesters that Jack's soul is completely gone. After healing Sam's injuries, Jack is confronted by a disturbed Mary, causing him to scream at her and then call her name in a worried tone as the episode fades to black, suggesting that Jack has done something to her.
305	18	"Absence"	Nina Lopez-Corrado	Robert Berens	April 11, 2019	T13.21168	1.47
Jack begins hallucinating Lucifer talking to him. At the same time, the Winchesters discover Nick's body and learn from Rowena that Mary is dead, accidentally killed by Jack's outburst. Castiel attempts to travel to Heaven to find Mary's soul for a resurrection while Jack approaches Rowena to use a spell from the Book of the Damned to resurrect Mary himself. Despite Rowena's warnings as Mary left no body behind, Jack attempts the spell, but only succeeds in bringing back Mary's body. After being intercepted by Duma, Castiel discovers that Mary is at peace in a special Heaven with John Winchester. Grief-stricken, the Winchesters and Castiel give Mary a hunter's funeral while Jack's Lucifer hallucination tries to convince him that he cannot trust the Winchesters any longer.
306	19	"Jack in the Box"	Robert Singer	Eugenie Ross-Leming & Brad Buckner	April 18, 2019	T13.21169	1.28
Following Mary's death, the Winchesters and Castiel begin hunting for Jack who is being manipulated by Duma, who now rules Heaven after overthrowing Naomi. Duma begins using Jack to establish a reign of terror over the Earth, beating humans into submission, removing all sense of mercy from Heaven and attempting to create more angels. After learning of what Jack has been doing, Castiel confronts an unrepentant Duma in Heaven. After Duma threatens to harm the souls of John and Mary, Castiel kills her and ends her reign of terror. At the same time, the Winchesters get Jack to return and trick him into the Ma'lak Box, intending to imprison him. As Castiel returns, horrified by what they have done, Jack breaks free of the Ma'lak Box urged on by his Lucifer hallucination.
307	20	"Moriah"	Phil Sgriccia	Andrew Dabb	April 25, 2019	T13.21170	1.30
After fleeing the bunker, Jack places everyone in the world under a mind control where they tell the truth all the time. He visits his grandparents who learned that Jack lied about his mother the last time he visited. As the Winchesters try to track down Jack, God appears after hearing Castiel's prayer, and he reverses Jack's actions. God warns them that Jack is a grave threat that they must deal with. God provides them with a gun that can kill Jack, but will also kill the shooter at the same time. Sam starts to become suspicious of God's motives. Dean confronts Jack in a cemetery, but although Jack encourages him to kill him, Dean realizes he still cares for Jack and cannot bring himself to hurt him. God reveals that he has been manipulating the situation like a story that he writes and is angered by Dean's failure to kill Jack. After he is confronted by his acts, God kills Jack himself and Sam's attempts at killing God fail. Jack awakens in the Empty where he is greeted by the Shadow and Billie, the latter telling Jack that they need to talk about the current situation. Enraged by their audacity, God decides to end the world and turn it into darkness, unleashing the souls of Hell upon the world. Sam, Dean, and Castiel are surrounded by an army of zombies.

== Production ==
On April 2, 2018, The CW renewed the series for a fourteenth season. In June, it was revealed that the fourteenth season would contain only 20 episodes, the series' shortest season since the third season which was only 16 episodes due to the 2007–08 Writers Guild of America strike. Filming for the season began on July 10, 2018, and concluded on March 26, 2019. With Lucifer having been killed at the end of the thirteenth season, actor Mark Pellegrino instead portrayed the role of Nick, Lucifer's former vessel.

== Reception ==
The review aggregator website Rotten Tomatoes reports an 83% approval rating for Supernatural's fourteenth season, with an average rating of 7.5/10 based on 12 reviews. The site's critics consensus reads, "Supernatural remains engrossing despite its almost spooky longevity, patiently doling out new paranormal challenges in a season that takes the time to reflect on a seismic shift amongst the ensemble's dynamics."

=== Ratings ===
Viewership and ratings per episode of Supernatural season 14
No.	Title	Air date	Rating/share (18–49)	Viewers (millions)	DVR (18–49)	DVR viewers (millions)	Total (18–49)	Total viewers (millions)
1	"Stranger in a Strange Land"	October 11, 2018	0.5/2	1.49	0.3	0.95	0.8	2.45
2	"Gods and Monsters"	October 18, 2018	0.5/2	1.53	0.3	0.95	0.8	2.49
3	"The Scar"	October 25, 2018	0.4/2	1.39	0.3	0.83	0.7	2.23
4	"Mint Condition"	November 1, 2018	0.4/2	1.46	0.3	0.75	0.7	2.21
5	"Nightmare Logic"	November 8, 2018	0.3/1	1.43	0.3	0.86	0.6	2.21
6	"Optimism"	November 15, 2018	0.4/2	1.48	0.4	0.86	0.8	2.34
7	"Unhuman Nature"	November 29, 2018	0.4/2	1.49	0.3	0.90	0.7	2.39
8	"Byzantium"	December 6, 2018	0.5/2	1.53	0.3	0.83	0.8	2.36
9	"The Spear"	December 13, 2018	0.4/2	1.43	0.3	0.80	0.7	2.23
10	"Nihilism"	January 17, 2019	0.4/2	1.44	0.3	0.90	0.7	2.34
11	"Damaged Goods"	January 24, 2019	0.4/2	1.44	0.3	0.92	0.7	2.36
12	"Prophet and Loss"	January 31, 2019	0.4/2	1.40	0.3	0.88	0.7	2.28
13	"Lebanon"	February 7, 2019	0.5/2	1.64	0.4	0.98	0.9	2.62
14	"Ouroboros"	March 7, 2019	0.4/2	1.28	0.3	0.89	0.7	2.17
15	"Peace of Mind"	March 14, 2019	0.4/2	1.51	0.3	0.91	0.7	2.42
16	"Don't Go in the Woods"	March 21, 2019	0.4/2	1.46	0.3	0.94	0.7	2.40
17	"Game Night"	April 4, 2019	0.3/2	1.25	0.3	0.92	0.7	2.17
18	"Absence"	April 11, 2019	0.4/2	1.47	0.3	0.75	0.7	2.23
19	"Jack in the Box"	April 18, 2019	0.3/2	1.28	0.4	0.83	0.7	2.11
20	"Moriah"	April 25, 2019	0.3/2	1.30	0.3	0.86	0.6	2.16
