= Dorg Van Dango =

Animated fantasy comedy series

- Genre: Fantasy; Comedy; Science fiction; Action-adventure
- Created by: Fabian Erlinghäuser; Nora Twomey
- Developed by: Nick V. Murphy
- Directed by: Fabian Erlinghäuser; Matt Ferguson; Rob Boutilier
- Voices of: Chance Hurstfield; Deven Mack; Tabitha St. Germain; Andrew McNee; Kazumi Evans; Michael Dobson; Briana Buckmaster; Gracyn Shinyei
- Composer: Leo Pearson
- Countries of origin: Canada; Ireland
- Original language: English
- No. of seasons: 1
- No. of episodes: 26 (51 segments)

Production
- Executive producers: Paul Young; Gerry Shirren; Josh Scherba; Anne Loi; Kirsten Newlands
- Producers: James Brown; Nuria González Blanco
- Editor: Cian McGarrigle
- Running time: 22 minutes (11 minutes per segment)
- Production companies: Cartoon Saloon; WildBrain Studios

Original release
- Network: RTÉjr / TRTE (Ireland); Family Channel (Canada); Nickelodeon (international)
- Release: March 3, 2020 – March 17, 2021

Dorg van Dango is an animated television series that first aired on RTÉ in Ireland on March 3, 2020, and on Family Channel in Canada on August 1, 2020. The series is created by Fabian Erlinghäuser and Nora Twomey and is produced by Cartoon Saloon and WildBrain Studios, and is made in association with Family Channel and RTÉ.

== Plot ==
The show follows the adventures of Dorg, a normal teen, living in the very normal town of Normill. That is, until he meets the Magicals; Jet Lazor, the super-cool unicorn; Patronella, an ancient witch; RD, a curious alien; and Yooki, an eerie ghost. They all escaped from Area 52 and are in desperate need of help and refuge.

To help them blend in with the citizens of Normill, Dorg disguises them as teenagers and hides them in the basement of the local shopping mall. As his friends assist him in navigating daily challenges, Dorg's circumstances change.

== Characters ==
=== Main ===
- Dorg (voiced by Chance Hurstfield) – the main character, a 13-year-old boy. (Note: Episode "Dorg Rewinds") He often serves as the voice of reason when problems arise among the Magicals.
- Jet Lazor (voiced by Deven Mack) – a unicorn who is the last of his species. His favourite food is apples. He's also rather smug and often comes across as self-centered. In "Dorg and the Birthday Boy", he is revealed to be 1,000 years old, making him the oldest member of the Magicals.
- Patronella (voiced by Tabitha St. Germain) – an ancient witch. She speaks broken English with a foreign accent. Her way of solving problems involves using magical spells. A running gag is when Patronella needs stuff for spells, she often rips off or gets unicorn stuff from Jet, much to his dismay.
- RD (voiced by Andrew McNee) – a curious blob-like alien. He is capable of shapeshifting, as well as storing vast amounts of objects within his body. He is somewhat dimwitted and goofy, with quite the appetite as well. In a flashback from "Dorg and the Magicals", RD was going to take over Earth, But due to the Beekeepers and General Gratch, he got stuck in Area 52.
- Yooki (voiced by Kazumi Evans) – an eerie ghost. Though she seems polite at first and is cheerful, she can quickly become very frightening.

=== Recurring ===
- Mr. Munch (voiced by Michael Dobson) – a mall security officer.
- Fretta (voiced by Briana Buckmaster) – Dorg's mother and the owner of a 98-cent store at the mall.
- Voulez (voiced by Gracyn Shinyei) – Dorg's baby sister.

=== Minor characters ===
- Smarmin Smarts (voiced by Ian Hanlin) – Dorg's nemesis who spoils everything Dorg does. He appears in "Dorg and the Last Supperman", and has a cameo in "Dorg Wants a Wand".
- Stacy & Tracy – Voulez's friends from Adventure Club. they appear in "Dorg the Dorgnificent" & "Dorg In Charge". They also have a cameo appearance in "Dorg Goes to Adventure Club".
- Bertram Bumbleback (voiced by Jason Simpson) – Normill's original founder. He was brought back to life by Dorg and The Magicals from the statue of the Munch Mall to help Dorg write a paper for school, but instead of taking notes, he wreaks havoc on the town. He also developed a crush on Patronella, But after saying that he hates witches (which Patronella is), Patronella turns him back into stone.

== Episodes ==
| No. | Title | Original release date | Prod. code |
|---|---|---|---|
| 1 | "Dorg Gets New Glasses / Dorg Fights Crime" | August 1, 2020 | 101 |
After Dorg breaks his glasses, he asks Patronella for help to restore them, but transforms him into a half-unicorn. / Dorg and the Magicals try to discover a thief suspected of breaking into the mall.
| 2 | "Dorg's in a Pickle / Dorg Gets a Job" | August 8, 2020 | 102 |
To make the perfect sandwich, Dorg and the Magicals must share the only pickle left in the house. / Dorg and the Magicals get a job rounding up stray shopping trollies at the mall.
| 3 | "Dorg's New Mom / Dorg Hates Olives" | August 15, 2020 | 103 |
Dorg wants to see a violent movie, but he is not old enough and none of the Magicals do sufficient jobs posing as adults. So, Yooki possesses Fretta so that she can come with Dorg and the Magicals to the movie. / Patronella casts a magic spell on Fretta's "Olive Surprise" in hopes that it will make it taste better, but instead, she ends up cursing it so it turns all the townspeople into olive-craving zombies.
| 4 | "Dorg Rewinds / Dorg and the Last Supperman" | August 22, 2020 | 104 |
Today's the day of the class trip to the amusement park, but Dorg keeps missing the bus to get there. Patronella creates a time-rewinding potion for Dorg to use to ensure he won't be late, but each attempt at using it backfires. / Dorg's favorite comic book is releasing its last issue. However, he is worried that Smarmin Smarts will spoil the ending of it, like he always does. Patronella ends up bringing the comic book to life, but the superhero escapes from it.
| 5 | "Dorg Wants Candy / Dorg and the Scary Doll" | August 29, 2020 | 105 |
On Halloween, Dorg must look after Voulez when all he wants to do is collect candy with his friends. Things get complicated even further when Dorg underestimates Yooki's claim that sugar will "awaken her sweet tooth", and feeds her a candy that makes her grow a long, candy corn-shaped tooth with a mind of its own and an insatiable hunger for candy. / Dorg and the Magicals meet a man who is donating old toys to stray animals. Dorg devises a plan to donate Voulez' old, creepy baby doll that is missing an eye, because it scares him.
| 6 | "Dorg Gets a Pimple / Dorg the Dorgnificent" | August 31, 2020 | 106 |
Desperate for a good yearbook photo, Dorg asks Patronella to magically remove the pimple on his chin. He's thrilled when the zit is gone, until the rest of his face disappears too. / Dorg tries casting a spell at his sister's birthday party
| 7 | "Dorg and the Coolnado / Dorg Writes a Paper" | September 1, 2020 | 107 |
When Jet is under the impression that he isn't cool enough, he takes advantage of Patronella's magic to become cooler but it backfires. / Dorg has an assignment for school to write a paper based on the town's founder, but he can't find any information on him. Yooki brings him back to life in an attempt to help, but this ends up causing drama at the mall.
| 8 | "Dorg Can't Act / Dorg and the Black Hole" | September 3, 2020 | 108 |
Dorg wishes to get a role in the school play, but Yooki possesses Dorg during his audition and he ends up getting the lead role instead of the small part he wanted. / RD gives Dorg a black hole from outer space to use as a science fair project, but Dorg and the Magicals keep putting things into the hole and cause it to grow so big that it becomes dangerous and nearly sucks up the whole town.
| 9 | "Dorg and the Pony Prance / Dorg and the Normole" | September 5, 2020 | 109 |
Dorg wishes to win a trophy since Voulez has won many and he hasn't won any, so he enters a horse-racing competition at the mall with Jet posing as his horse. However, in order for Jet to compete, Patronella uses a magic spell to conceal his horn - and without his unicorn horn, Jet loses his confidence and has magical indigestion that causes unexpected negative consequences during the race. / RD takes on the form of the Normole, the town's mascot, at the mall so that Dorg's wish of gaining access to the Mall Pass can be granted. However, while Dorg and the other Magicals have fun with the Mall Pass, RD's mascot job overworks him.
| 10 | "Dorg Wants to Stay / Dorg's in Charge" | September 7, 2020 | 110 |
When Dorg's mom decides she's sick of all the weirdness of Normill, the gang will need to use their powers to stop the family from moving. / When Dorg's left in charge of Voulez and her friends, they catch a glimpse of Jet without a disguise and will stop.
| 11 | "Dorg's Big Date / Dorg in the Ring" | September 8, 2020 | 111 |
Dorg doesn't want his mom to know that he is failing his home ec class, so he has RD disguise himself as the teacher and speak to his mom. However, he doesn't know what to say and ends up accidentally asking Fretta on a date. / Dorg goes to a wrestling match in town with Fretta and Voulez, who sell popcorn at the match. Dorg wants to see his favorite wrestler win, and Jet thinks it could be possible if he used some unicorn magic that would guarantee him winning. Dorg and Jet disregard the others warning them, and Jet and Patronella end up causing a magical mishap where the wrestler ends up turning into a chicken moments before the match. So, Jet molds Dorg and RD together into the likeness of the wrestler in order to compete.
| 12 | "Dorg and the Christmas Fairy / Dorg vs. Dorg" | September 14, 2020 | 112 |
When Patronella brings a tree ornament to life that hates Christmas, it's up to Dorg and the Magicals to stop the fairy from ruining Christmas. / Patronella brings Dorg's reflection to life to do chores. When the reflection gets jealous, it's the real Dorg that finds himself trapped in a mirror.
| 13 | "Dorg and the Birthday Boy / Dorg Gets The Perfect Gift" | September 19, 2020 | 113 |
It's Jet's birthday, and on a unicorn's birthday, 10 stages of change happen to them. However, he is not willing to accept the fact that he must go through these changes. / It's Mother's Day and Dorg forgot to get Fretta a gift, so RD takes on the form of the fancy coat of her dreams.
| 14 | "Dorg Wants a Laugh/Dorg Wants a Day Off" | March 1, 2021 | 114 |
Patronella casts a spell that makes people laugh at Dorg when they look at him, and the only way to break the curse is with a real laugh. / When the gang fakes being sick for a day off, Dorg ends up in the hospital for real and needs to bust out in order to find a cure.
| 15 | "Dorg and the Very Special Flower/Dorg Sells Cookies" | March 2, 2021 | 115 |
Sick of caring for Fretta's favorite flower, Dorg and the gang cast a spell to keep it out of their hair, but it backfires. / Dorg wants to win a big prize for selling Adventure Club cookies, but the gang scupper things by eating every box themselves.
| 16 | "Dorg Wants to Bounce/Dorg and the Heatwave" | March 3, 2021 | 116 |
When a jealous Dorg steals his sister's Jumpsy Boots, a rubbish truck ends up picking them up and driving away with them. / Dorg and the gang cast a spell to cool things down during a heatwave, but then the air conditioning breaks down.
| 17 | "Dorg Wants a Wand/Dorg Has A Nightmare" | March 4, 2021 | 117 |
The gang fix Patronella's old wand and turn her into Patti Perfect, who zaps every imperfection in town until there's almost nothing left. / When a pineapple man monster from Dorg's nightmares follows him into the real world, Dorg faces his fears to find out what it wants.
| 18 | "Dorg Goes to Adventure Club/Dorg Wants a Scare" | March 5, 2021 | 118 |
When Dorg accidentally shrinks his sister's Adventure Club sash, he must replace the badges by earning them. / Dorg wants a good scare but learns how scared he can get when Patronella fills his house with all of the gang's secret fears.
| 19 | "Dorg the Good Doer/Dorg Wants to Shred" | March 8, 2021 | 119 |
Dorg and the gang are out doing good deeds when they're blamed for a town crime spree and need to catch the real thief before it's too late. / The gang is starting a band, but when Yooki binds the spirit of a rock star to Dorg's guitar, Dorg is stuck with the evil instrument.
| 20 | "Dorg Loves Tacos/Dorg vs. The Drones" | March 9, 2021 | 120 |
It's Taco Tuesday and there's a taco shell shortage in town, but Patronella ends up casting a spell that creates a new Tuesday tradition. / When a high-tech rival store opens up across from the 98 Cent Store, Dorg and the gang use their powers to keep his mum in business.
| 21 | "Dorg and the Hamster/Dorg Wants to Sleep" | March 10, 2021 | 121 |
It's Dorg's turn to look after class hamster Zippy, but a series of magical mishaps lead the gang and the hamster into chaos. / Dorg can't sleep, but when Patronella casts a spell to help him, it puts all of Normill to sleep and the gang must wake the town back up.
| 22 | "Dorg is Ghosted/Dorg and the Meltdown" | March 11, 2021 | 122 |
When Yooki is caught in one of Mr. Munch's ghost traps, Dorg and the gang must rescue her before she's exposed on live TV. / When a video game from RD's planet infects every machine in Normill, Dorg and the gang must stop the chaos before it's game over.
| 23 | "Dorg and the Germ/Dorg the Troublemaker" | March 12, 2021 | 123 |
Dorg is sick and the Magicals become microscopic to help fight his cold, only for the cold germ to escape from Dorg's body into Normill. / When the new art teacher at school decides that Dorg's a troublemaker, the gang try to get back in the teacher's good books.
| 24 | "Dorg Plays Minigolf/Dorg's Model Behavior" | March 15, 2021 | 124 |
When Patronella accidentally turns Dorg into a giant golf ball, the gang have to play a perfect round to keep him from flattening Normill. / When Mr. Munch starts selling perfume with Patronella's picture on it, she adds in a bit of magic that causes lookalikes to sprout up.
| 25 | "Dorg Needs a Shot/Dorg Wants a Shortcut" | March 16, 2021 | 125 |
Dorg thinks that his worst nightmare is needles, but when Fretta and Mr. Munch go on a few dates, he realizes that could be worse. / The Magicals build shortcut tunnels so they can slide straight to every place in Normill, but the tunnels are soon found.
| 26 | "Dorg and the Magicals" | March 17, 2021 | 126 |
As the Magicals track down an alien substance for RD, General Gratch and his scientists arrive in Normill on the hunt for magic. / Time is running out for Dorg and the Magicals to find the rare Numpty Newt - with General Gratch closing in, will they ever find it?

Note: All episodes' airdates indicates the Canadian airdate for them.

== Broadcast ==
The series was first shown on TRTÉ and RTEjr in Ireland on 3 March 2020, and premiered on Family Channel in Canada on August 1, 2020, and was acquired to Family CHRGD (WildBrainTV) on July 22, 2022. The series also aired on Nicktoons in the UK on August 31, 2020. The show has aired on Nickelodeon on October 26, 2020, in France, Nickelodeon in Southeast Asia, Latin America and Brazil in late 2020, and Australia in January 2021. It has also aired on the Nicktoons Europe feed in late 2020 and early 2021.

As of November 29, 2021, the show had also aired on ABC Me in Australia.

As of 2022, the show had also aired on CITV in the UK, RTP2 in Portugal and TF1 in France.

== Awards ==
The series has won a number of awards, including at the 2020 Leo Awards and the 2021 Irish Animation Awards. Wins have included:

- 2021 Irish Animation Awards:
  - Best Director of an Animated TV Series (Fabian Erlinghauser, Matt Ferguson; Cartoon Saloon)
  - Best Music (Leo Pearson; Cartoon Saloon)
- 2020 Leo Awards:
  - Best Voice Performance in an Animation Program or Series (Chance Hurstfield)
