= Son of the Shark =

Son of the Shark (Le Fils du Requin)
- Directed by: Agnes Merlet
- Written by: Santiago Amigorena; Agnes Merlet
- Produced by: Francois Fries
- Starring: Ludovic Vandendaele; Eric Da Silva; Sandrine Blancke; Maxime Leroux
- Cinematography: Gerard Simon
- Edited by: Guy Lecorne; Pierre Choukroun
- Music by: Bruno Coulais
- Production company: Gaumont
- Distributed by: Gaumont Buena Vista International
- Release date: 24 November 1993
- Running time: 88 minutes
- Country: France
- Language: French

Son of the Shark (French: Le Fils du Requin) is a 1993 French film directed by Agnes Merlet, about two brothers, Martin (Ludovic Vandendaele) and Simon (Eric Da Silva), and their adventures as juvenile delinquents in the north of France.

Inspired by a well-known passage of Lautréamont's Les Chants de Maldoror, Martin holds a belief, in which he claims to be "the son of a female shark". He hopes that someday he and his brother, Simon will disappear to the bottom of the ocean, where they will live happily ever after surrounded by dancing fish.

== Cast ==
- Ludovic Vandendaele as Martin
- Eric Da Silva as Simon
- Sandrine Blancke as Marie
- Maxime Leroux as The father
- Yolande Moreau as The driver
- Olivier Saladin
- Jacques Mathou

== Production ==
Filming took place first in Ault (Somme), followed by Tréport, and finally in Dieppe (both Seine-Maritime).

== Awards and nominations ==
The film won the 1994 European Film Award for "Young European Film of the Year", the Avignon Film Festival's Prix Tournage, and the Joseph Plateau Award for Best Belgian actress. It was also nominated for César Award for Best Debut.
