= Hideaways =

- Directed by: Agnès Merlet
- Written by: Nick Murphy
- Produced by: Marc Missonnier; Olivier Delbosc; Jean-Luc Ormieres
- Starring: Rachel Hurd-Wood; Harry Treadaway; James Wilson; Thomas Sangster; Susan Lynch
- Narrated by: Rachel Hurd-Wood
- Cinematography: Tim Fleming
- Music by: Eric Neveux
- Production company: Ardmore Studios
- Distributed by: Wild Bunch
- Release date: 21 April 2011 (Tribeca)
- Countries: Ireland; France; Sweden
- Language: English
- Budget: €6.6 million

Hideaways is a fantasy thriller film directed by Agnès Merlet and written by Nick Murphy. It stars Rachel Hurd-Wood and Harry Treadaway. The film is a French/Irish/Swedish co-production.

== Plot ==
James Furlong is the last in a long line of Furlongs who were each blessed or cursed with a strange ability. His grandfather, Charlie went temporarily blind when he thought about sex. His father, Philip could turn off anything electrical when he was frightened. From the moment of his violent birth, involving the death of his mother, his life seems ill-fated, but it is unclear what kind of ability, if any, he possesses. Growing up in rural Ireland, his grandmother tells him about the strange quirks of his ancestors and the boy begins to experiment on himself, longing to discover some extraordinary, hidden power. But instead, his experiments lead to the death of his family's livestock, followed swiftly by the loss of Philip and his beloved grandmother, Charlotte. By the time he is ten years old, James is the sole survivor of the Furlong family.

James is sent to St. Judes reformatory, but does not adjust easily to life there. Having been home-schooled on the farm, he is not equipped with the necessary social skills or abilities on the sports-field. He is bullied by the other boys, especially Kevin and Stephen. His only friend is Liam, the only one who shows him any kindness. His powers then kill the hurling Coach's vicious dog Tinkerbell. The principal, Mrs. Moore, suspects Kevin because of his smug attitude. Kevin and Stephen attack James, for getting Kevin into trouble. A mysterious illness then sweeps through the reformatory, killing everyone except James and Liam, who flees and suffers only lung problems. In the chaos that ensues, he finally begins to comprehend the dark, destructive nature of his powers, and at the first opportunity he goes into hiding.

Years later, he is discovered by a young woman, living out a lonely existence completely isolated from society. Mae (named after actress Mae West) has run away from hospital where she is being treated for cancer and comes across James's cottage deep in the woods by chance. Initially, he is reluctant to have anything to do with her, fearful of harming her, but Mae has already resigned herself to her fate and is afraid of very little – certainly not of James with his gentle nature, and childlike innocence. Even when she learns his story, she is unafraid, and urges him to leave the cottage and his lonely life behind. Mae wants to savour all the time she has left in the world and hates to see someone so loving and compassionate isolated from it and denying himself everything that life has to offer.

They soon fall in love, but Mae returns to the hospital soon after. James visits her, where they consummate their love. Soon after, James bumps into Liam, the sole survivor from the reformatory. In the final climactic scenes, Liam confronts James with the destruction of his past, and kills him with a pair of scissors, before running away. James' strange powers had cured everyone in the hospital and stopped Mae's death. The film ends six years later with Mae telling their six-year-old daughter, Diana (named after singer Diana Ross) about James.

== Cast ==
- Rachel Hurd-Wood as Mae-West O'Mara
- Harry Treadaway as James Furlong
- James Wilson as James Furlong (10)
- Thomas Brodie-Sangster as Liam
- Susan Lynch as Mrs O'Mara
- Stuart Graham as Sergeant
- Aaron Monaghan as Philip Furlong
- Diarmuid O'Dwyer as Liam (11)
- Craig Connolly as Kevin
- Patrick Behan as Jimmy
- Calem Martin as Stephen
- Chris Johnston as Bully
- Shane Curry as Bully 3
- Kate O'Toole as Mrs. Moore
- Bern Deegan as Charlie Furlong (32)
- Mairead Reynolds as Charlotte Furlong (28)
- Holly Gregg as Laura
- Niamh Shaw as Night Nurse
- Tom Collins as Mr. Boyle
- Brianna O' Driscoll as Diana-Ross Furlong-O'Mara
- Callum Maloney as Philip Furlong (5)
- Joe Dermody as Coach Hanley

== Production ==
Principal photography began on 10 May 2010 in Ireland. Filming took place on location in counties Wicklow and Meath. Filming was scheduled to last two months, but completion of principal photography was delayed as a result of Hurd-Wood becoming ill. Filming locations included Ballygarth Castle in Julianstown, County Meath and Shanganagh Castle in Shankill, Dublin. The film was originally called The Last Furlong but was changed to Hideaways. It premiered in the 2011 Tribeca Film Festival.
