= Zachariah (Supernatural) =

- Supernatural character
- First appearance: "It's a Terrible Life" (2009)
- Last appearance: "Lebanon" (2019)
- Portrayed by: Kurt Fuller; Chad Rook (alternate reality version)

In-universe information
- Species: Angel
- abilities: Body manipulation Human possession Memory manipulation Telekinesis; Teleportation; Time manipulation

Zachariah is a fictional character portrayed by Kurt Fuller on The CW Television Network's drama and horror television series Supernatural. An angel, he first appears in the fourth season and helps manipulate the series protagonist Sam Winchester into releasing Lucifer onto the Earth. In the fifth season, he attempts to convince Dean Winchester into serving as the human vessel for the archangel Michael to start the apocalypse. The opportunity to play an angel initially excited Fuller because he thought that it would give him the chance to break away from his streak of playing villains. Despite the character turning into an antagonist halfway through his appearances, the actor was very proud of the role. Critical reception for the character has been positive, with his sinister humor being of particular note. Kurt Fuller later reprised the role in the show's 300th episode "Lebanon" in season 14, playing the Zachariah from an alternate timeline created by the disappearance of John Winchester in 2003.

In season 13, an alternate reality version of Zachariah appears portrayed by Chad Rook.

== Plot ==
Zachariah debuts in the fourth season episode "It's a Terrible Life", in which he motivates series protagonist Dean Winchester to resume his attempts at preventing demons from releasing Lucifer from his imprisonment in Hell. When the prophet Chuck Shurley (really God in disguise) receives an ominous vision of Dean and his brother Sam in "The Monster at the End of the Book", however, Zachariah warns him against alerting the Winchesters. His true motives are revealed in the season finale "Lucifer Rising", in which he explains that the angels have been running Heaven in God's absence for many years. Zachariah imprisons Dean and admits that Heaven will allow Lucifer to be freed because paradise on Earth can only be attained by defeating Lucifer during the apocalypse. The angel Castiel, who has become friends with the Winchesters, rescues Dean at the cost of his own life. However, Dean is too late in stopping Sam from killing the demon Lilith, an act they were unaware would break the final seal imprisoning Lucifer.

In the fifth season premiere "Sympathy for the Devil", Zachariah reveals to the Winchester that Dean is destined to serve as the human vessel for the archangel Michael in the coming battle against Lucifer. When Dean refuses, Zachariah tortures the Winchesters by inflicting various diseases upon them. However, Zachariah is shocked when Castiel appears, and flees after restoring the brothers out of fear that God (who was previously believed gone) saved the Winchesters from Lucifer and resurrected Castiel. Sam and Dean later have a falling out and go their separate ways. Zachariah uses this opportunity in "The End" to send Dean to an apocalyptic future in which he never became Michael's vessel and Lucifer now controls the planet using Sam as his own vessel. When Dean is returned to the present, though, he still refuses to become Michael's vessel because he realizes that he must rejoin Sam to keep him from becoming Lucifer's vessel. Zachariah tried to keep Dean trapped but Castiel saved him in time. Zachariah makes yet another attempt in "Dark Side of the Moon", taking joy in both physically and psychologically torturing the brothers in Heaven after they are killed by fellow hunters for their involvement in freeing Lucifer. God intervenes again, though, instructing his angelic emissary Joshua to restore the Winchesters' lives. Michael gives Zachariah one final chance in "Point of No Return". He resurrects Sam and Dean's deceased half-brother Adam under the false pretense that he will take Dean's place as Michael's vessel, in exchange for his brothers. In truth, Adam is an unsuspecting bait to lure in Dean, who finally acquiesces to host Michael when Zachariah tortures Sam and Adam. However, Dean has a change of heart at the last moment and lures Zachariah close by demanding Michael kill Zachariah as one of his conditions for saying yes. Once Zachariah is close enough, Dean stabs him through the head with an angel blade, killing him.

In the season 13 episode "Good Intentions," an alternate reality version of Zachariah appears. This Zachariah attempts to aid the alternate Michael in manipulating the Nephilim Jack into opening a portal from the Apocalypse World to the main reality. Zachariah's mind tricks fail to fool Jack, who escapes with Mary Winchester. Zachariah later leads an attack on one of the few remaining human colonies which is led by the alternate reality version of Bobby Singer. During a confrontation with Mary, Zachariah is combusted to dust by Jack, who similarly kills Zachariah's few remaining soldiers.

In the season 13 finale "Let the Good Times Roll", Dean flashes back on what Zachariah told him about being the Michael Sword while forming a plan to work with the alternate Michael to defeat Lucifer.

In season 14's "Lebanon," the Winchesters inadvertently create an alternate timeline by summoning John Winchester from 2003. Detecting the time alterations, Zachariah travels to Lebanon, Kansas to investigate along with Castiel, still a loyal and unquestioning soldier of Heaven. They inadvertently draw the attention of the Winchesters who are shocked to find Zachariah alive and Castiel evil. Realizing that the Winchesters are responsible, Zachariah orders Castiel to kill Dean while he tortures Sam for information. Zachariah makes the mistake of getting in Sam's face to taunt him, allowing Sam to draw a hidden angel blade and kill Zachariah once again before banishing Castiel. After John is returned to 2003, the alternate timeline and this version of Zachariah are erased from history.

== Characterization ==
Zachariah's actor, Kurt Fuller, saw Zachariah as a "genius", explaining, "Zachariah knows what he is doing is the right thing, and he's really doing it all. If people would only understand, he's doing it because he knows what's right." Zachariah's willingness to let millions of humans die for his goal was likened by both Fuller and the character himself to breaking a few eggs to make an omelet. Fuller explained that Zachariah finds humans to be an "inferior incarnation of life", and theorized that Zachariah's long-awaited paradise on Earth "would be completely malleable humans serving Heaven". Due to the character's self-righteousness, Fuller felt that Zachariah "can be funny, strong, pathetic, cool, or do whatever he has to do". Of these characteristics, the actor especially enjoyed Zachariah's sense of humor, and also admired his ability to manipulate people, saying, "It takes a lot more creativity... Anybody can blast somebody out of a building. That's easy, but to talk them into jumping out of the windows is much harder." The actor also liked the sadistic aspect to Zachariah's personality, noting that the character "took such relish in it" and "just loved what he did". Ultimately, however, Fuller found Zachariah to be the "hero of the story", attempting to "save all of eternity and maintain the proper balance between Heaven and Hell".

"The tragedy of Zachariah is that he had so many tools at his disposal, so many things he could do, and he just couldn't pull it off. [His death] is sort of satisfying, though, because he's really gone to the dark side and the dark side cannot win, no matter how powerful it is."
— Kurt Fuller on Zachariah's failures

Fuller said that the prospects of "getting a big promotion" in Heaven initially motivated Zachariah. In regards to his character's initial friendliness to Dean, he explained, "You don't get what you want by being a complete jerk, so you use a little threat, enticement, and appeal to their best natures or the part of them that wants to do good. Just like in life, you can't dominate someone and get what you want. You will only get resentment and they will try to screw you any chance they can. That's what [Zachariah] was trying to avoid." The character's later animosity towards Dean stems from him being in Zachariah's way, with Dean's determination and intelligence leading to contempt from Zachariah rather than respect. By Zachariah's final appearance, Fuller felt that the character "has really cracked" due to his rivalry with Dean; as the actor described it, "He's fifty-two percent revenge, forty-eight percent still trying to make his plan work." Fuller also believed that, despite these ignoble reasons playing a large part in his character's motivations, Zachariah also had genuinely good intentions.

== Development ==
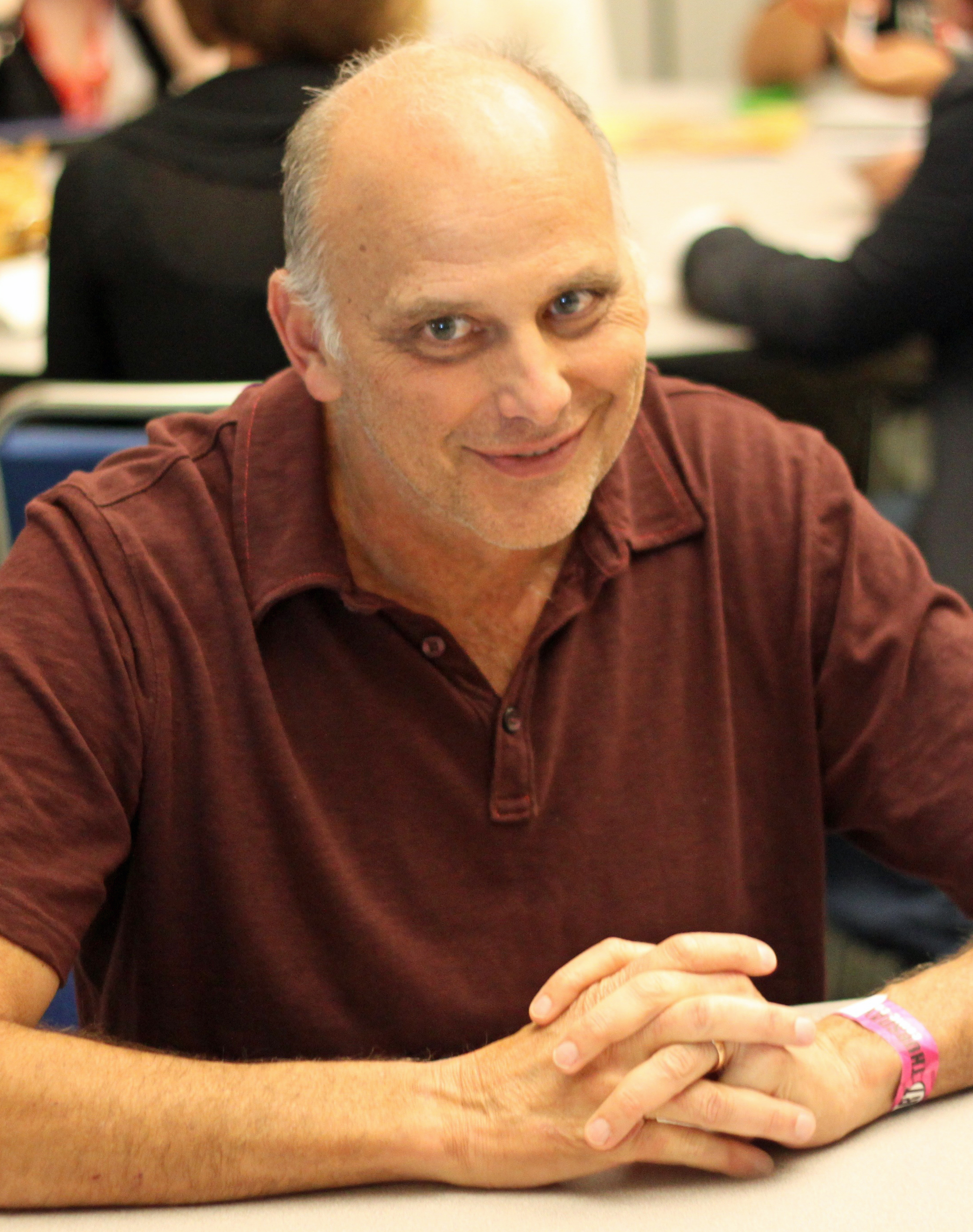
Fuller expected to portray a "really nice guy" like Barney Fife or Andy Griffith.

Fuller broke his habit of not auditioning for episodic television because he was so impressed by Supernatural. At the time of his audition, he was unaware that Zachariah would be revealed as an angel. Upon learning of the character's nature, Fuller was excited at the chance to break his tradition of portraying villainous characters. However, as Fuller related, "Then I got the script for my second episode and [Zachariah] wasn't so nice. By the third episode, [he] was stealing people's lungs and giving them stomach cancer. So I've just decided that apparently I'm incapable of playing a nice guy. I turn all my characters bad. I'm the meanest man on TV..." The actor stated that he himself typically comes off as unkind even when portraying benevolent characters, so he chose to play Zachariah as a boss type of character instead, believing that Zachariah's introduction—in which he acted as a memory-wiped Dean's boss—"was a great way into it". As a result, although Zachariah had been described to him as "a Morgan Freeman-type with a lot of equanimity"—a concept which Fuller still tried to incorporate into his performance—Fuller felt the character ended up resembling Donald Trump. Although Fuller did prepare for the role by researching angels, he did not allow that to influence him, as the stereotypical concepts tend to "[get] away from the spirit of the show". Fuller explained, "The script will tell me how this particular angel acts. Besides, this show does not strictly adhere to anything, so I made a decision to really use the script as my 'bible'."

Although Fuller expected Zachariah to die in the fifth season, he felt that the character's death in the hundredth episode came "a little early". Fuller was proud of the role, admitting, "I was actually very upset that [Zachariah] was dying, because it honestly was a part of me that died." Despite Zachariah's demise, the actor expressed interest in returning to the role if ever asked to.

== Reception ==
Fuller received universal praise from critics for his portrayal of Zachariah. Maureen Ryan of Chicago Tribune felt Fuller was "absolutely spot-on as the overly chipper and slightly sinister" character, and loved the actor's ability to "[wring] the humor out of almost every one of his lines while still remaining scary under Zach's bluff exterior". John Kubicek of BuddyTV found Fuller perfect at "balancing that fine line between comedy and evil". While Kubicek admitted he would miss the character, he was excited to see Zachariah die "in as awesome a way as possible". Zack Handlen of The A.V. Club similarly called the character's final scene "satisfying", but was "a little sad" to see "such a well-realized bad-guy" leave the series. Tina Charles of TV Guide also enjoyed Fuller's time on the series and felt he "can do no wrong in [her] book as Zachariah". She liked that the character could go "toe to toe with Dean like no other", and considered him "downright evil" despite his motives. Likewise, Diana Steenbergen of IGN deemed him "definitely a villain that it is easy to hate".
