= Agnès Merlet =

French film director (born 1959)

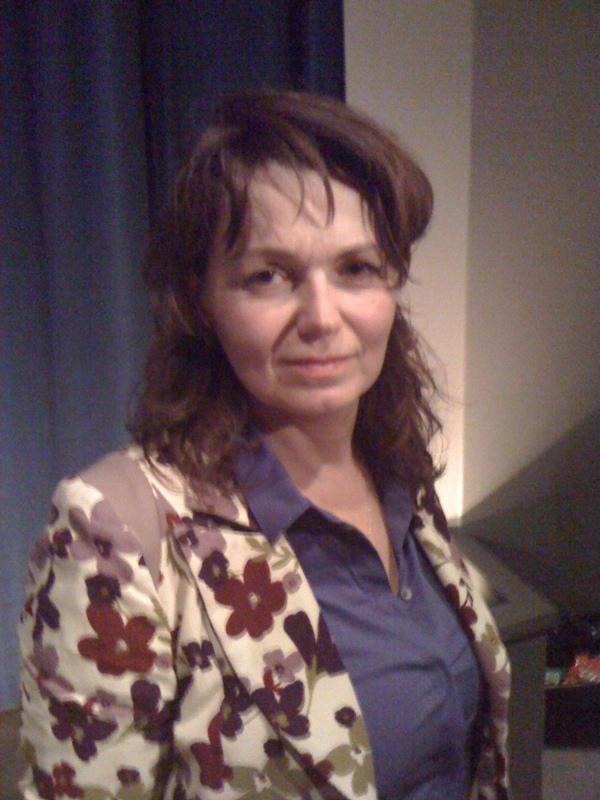
- Merlet after the Q&A at FFF
- Born: 4 January 1959 (age 67)
- Occupation: Film director

Agnès Merlet (French: [aɲɛs mɛʁlɛ]; born 4 January 1959) is a French film director who is known for directing Son of the Shark, Artemisia and Dorothy Mills. Recently she directed the Irish/French/Swedish co-production Hideaways starring Rachel Hurd-Wood and Harry Treadaway.

== Filmography ==
=== Director ===
- Hideaways (2011)
- Dorothy Mills (2008)
- Artemisia (1997)
- Son of the Shark (1993)
- Poussières d'étoiles (1986)
- Guerre des pâtes, La (1985)

=== Writer ===
- Dorothy Mills (2008)
- Artemisia (1997)

=== Producer ===
- Dorothy Mills (2008)
