= Yadira Guevara-Prip =

American stage and television actress (born 1995)

- Born: May 22, 1995 (age 31); New York City, U.S.
- Other name: Yadi Prip
- Occupation: Actress
- Years active: 2013–present

Yadira Helena Guevara-Prip (born May 22, 1995) is an American stage and television actress, best known for her roles in Star Trek: Discovery, Supernatural, 13 Reasons Why, and See.

== Career ==
Guevara-Prip began her work as an actress on the stage in New York City, landing roles in many works by Latin American playwrights and theatre companies. During the 2010s Guevara-Prip performed in productions by the Atlantic Theater Company, Cherry Lane Theatre, and INTAR Theater, among others. In 2016 Guevara-Prip played the character of Lala in the world premiere of Pia Scala-Zankel's play Street Children, for which she was praised by The New York Times.

Guevara-Prip made her television debut in 2016 as Zinky on the Amazon Prime Video series Mad Dogs. In 2017 she landed the role of Kaia Nieves on Supernatural. Guevara-Prip went on to reprise the role for Supernatural's 13th, 14th and 15th seasons. In 2018 Guevara-Prip made her first appearance in the Star Trek franchise portraying the Xahean queen Me Hani Ika Hali Ka Po in the premiere episode of Short Treks on CBS All Access. She returned as Po for Star Trek: Discovery's second season, for the season's final two episodes.

In 2018, Guevara-Prip worked with the Breaking Walls Foundation to bring dozens of teens from around the world to Santiago, Chile for a residency of theatrical and creative writing workshops.

In 2019, Guevara-Prip became a regular cast member in the first season of the dystopian science fiction series See. The show was one of four inaugural scripted serials to be featured with the launch of Apple TV+ in November 2019, and Guevara-Prip starred as Bow Lion, a shadow warrior for a clan of nomadic people living 500 years in the future. Apple renewed the show for a second season shortly after its debut. In December 2019 the website Cinemaholic reported that Guevara-Prip would return for season 2.

In 2020, Guevara-Prip appeared on an episode of HBO's High Maintenance.

== Filmography ==
=== Film ===
Year	Title	Role	Notes
2012	#ImHere - THE CALL	Teresa	Short
2014	About a Brookie	Lauren	Short
2025	A House of Dynamite	NGA Duty Officer	

=== Television ===
Year	Title	Role	Notes
2016	Mad Dogs	Zinky	2 episodes
2017	Untitled Jenny Lumet Project	Monica	Unsold pilot
2017–2020	Supernatural	Kaia Nieves / Dark Kaia	5 episodes
2018	Hello Apartment	Girl	Short
2018	Star Trek: Short Treks	Me Hani Ika Hali Ka Po	Episode: "Runaway"
2019	Star Trek: Discovery	Me Hani Ika Hali Ka Po	2 episodes
2019–2022	See	Bow Lion / The Shadow	11 episodes
2020	High Maintenance	Minnie	Episode: "Adelante"
2020	13 Reasons Why	Valerie Diaz	2 episodes
2025	Chicago P.D.	Jimena Sanz	2 episodes
