= Richard Speight Jr. =

American actor

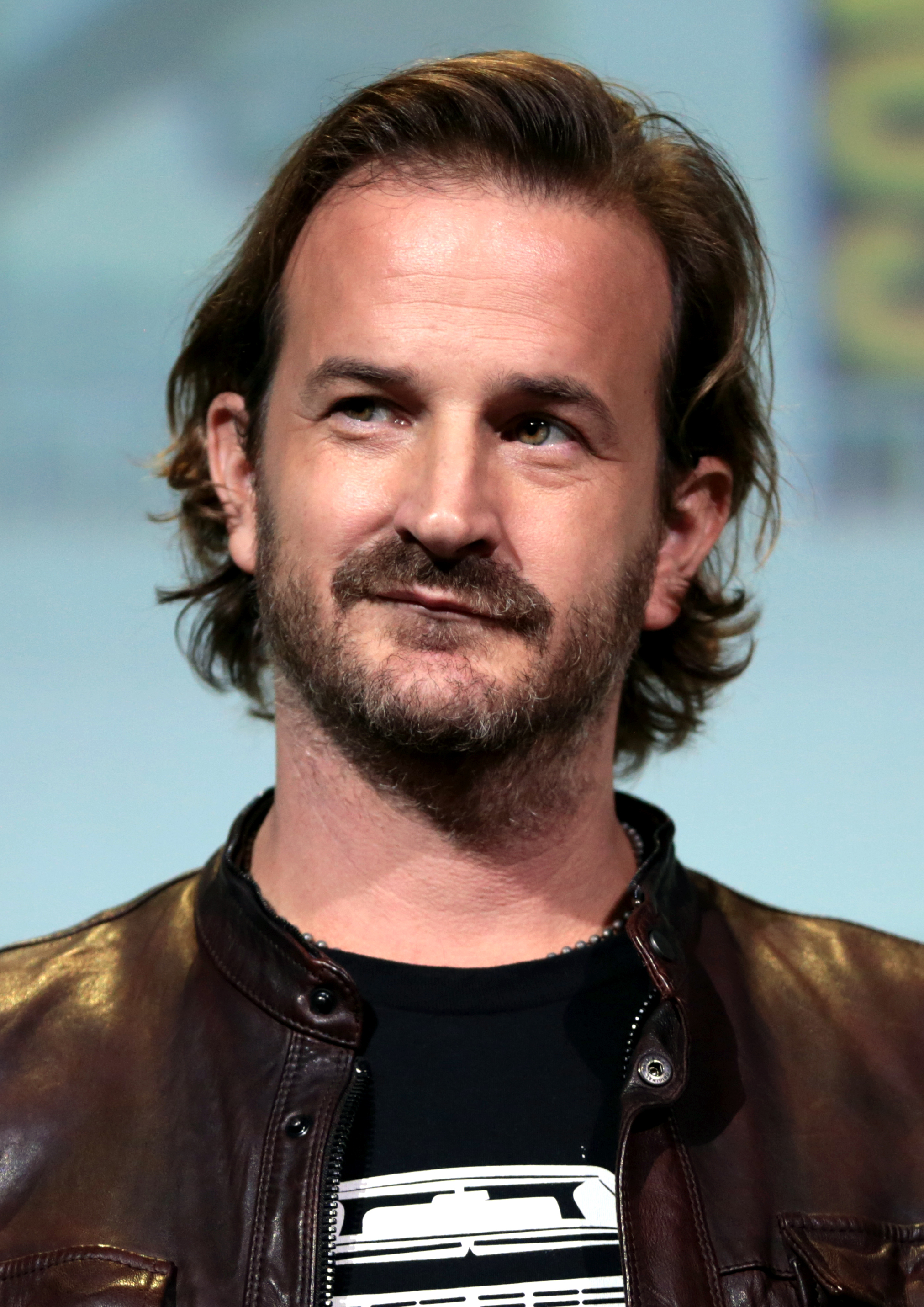
- Speight in 2016
- Born: Nashville, Tennessee, U.S.
- Occupations: Actor, director
- Years active: 1984–present
- Spouse: Jaci Hays (m. 2003)
- Children: 3

Richard Speight Jr. is an American actor and director who is known for a variety of roles including Jericho, The Agency, both CBS TV series, and the HBO miniseries Band of Brothers. In the WB/CW series Supernatural, he played a recurring role, the archangel Gabriel, originally thought to be a "Trickster" or Loki, as well as Loki whose identity Gabriel took on. More recently, he played Dugan in the 2021 film Old Henry.

== Personal life ==
Speight grew up in Nashville, the son of Barbara and Richard Speight Sr. He has two older sisters. He attended Montgomery Bell Academy and the USC School of Dramatic Arts (formerly the USC School of Theatre), graduating cum laude. While at USC, he met and befriended writer and director Stephen Chbosky.

Richard Speight appeared in Chbosky's senior showcase piece. Years later, the two teamed up on the CBS series Jericho which Chbosky co-created. In 2003, Speight married Jaci Kathryn Hays, a dot-com executive from California.

== Career ==
=== Television ===
Speight has starred in a variety of commercials for Got Milk?; IBM; Pepsi; and Disney. He played Sgt. Warren "Skip" Muck in the Golden Globe and Emmy Award-winning World War II miniseries Band of Brothers, produced for HBO by Tom Hanks and Steven Spielberg. Speight appeared in several television series including The Agency, ER, Jericho, Party of Five, and JAG.

In 2007, he landed a recurring role on Supernatural where he played 'The Trickster/Loki' (later revealed to be the archangel Gabriel). Making a surprise return in 2018, Speight's characters returned to the screens as dual roles of Gabriel and Loki in season 13 episode "Unfinished Business", while simultaneously directing the episode himself. He had a recurring role on Justified, and guest starred on shows such as Life, Memphis Beat, Longmire, CSI: Crime Scene Investigation (2014), Criminal Minds: Beyond Borders (2017).

=== Film ===
Speight's earlier work included a role in the film, Ernest Goes to Camp; and a regular role on the NBC Saturday morning sitcom, Running the Halls. He had a brief appearance in the film, Thank You for Smoking, directed and written by fellow USC alumnus Jason Reitman. Speight appeared in Speed 2: Cruise Control and The Last Big Attraction. He had a starring role in Reitman's short film, In God We Trust. Although credited, Speight does not appear in the film Independence Day, as the footage he was filmed in was cut in the final version.

His more recent productions include La Musica Provata, The Week (2016), Mucho Dinero, Brick Madness, Bad, Bad Men, and Death House (2016). Lead roles include an FBI agent in a thriller, The Evil Gene (2016), and in a feature-length comedy thriller Driven (2019).

=== Web series ===
Speight is a close friend of actor Rob Benedict. They often appear at conventions in tandem. Together, they created the comedy web-series Kings of Con (2016) based on their experiences at conventions for Supernatural, a TV show in which they both were featured actors and beloved characters. Speight is co-writer, producer, director, and actor in Kings of Con and plays a "heightened version of himself" as character Richard Slate. With the support of a successful Indiegogo campaign, the series launched on November 15, 2016, at the headquarters of Comic-Con, and internationally through multiple platforms. An after show called Kings of Conversation is available on their Facebook page.

=== Directing and writing ===
Speight's directing career began with co-directing/co-starring in the independent feature North Beach (2004). A copy of this work is being preserved as part of SF History section at the main branch of the San Francisco Public Library. In 2013, he wrote and directed the satirical social comedy America 101. The festival darling and award-winning 10-minute short stars Band of Brothers veteran, Rick Gomez; co-stars Amy Gumenick, and North Beach alumni Jayden Lund and Jim Hanna. Now available on iTunes, the short feature is described as "One man's life becomes the lesson of the day when he takes a frenetic ride through his own personal version of the American experience."

Success of America 101 launched Speight into being a director for commercials. He directed several spots for Pepsi and other major national brands. After having success in commercial directing and rigorous preparation in a Warner Bros. TV director's workshop, Speight made his debut as a television director on Supernatural's season 11 episode "Just My Imagination"–the first episode to have been nominated for a Hugo Award in the show's 15-year history. In the season 13 episode "Unfinished Business", he both acted and directed himself in the dual characters of Gabriel and Loki. He continued to direct a few episodes each season throughout 11-15, achieving a total of eleven episodes by the show's end in fall 2020. Speight is the Top "8th" Director of Supernatural by episode count.

Speight continued as a TV director with Netflix's Lucifer, CW's Kung Fu, and Walker.

=== Podcast ===
Speight has participated in several celebrity podcasts including Thrilling Adventure Hour (Episodes 148, 159, 165, 171, 195, 196) and Michael Rosenbaum's Inside of You (2018). After the beginning of the 2020 Coronavirus pandemic, Benedict and Speight teamed again to brighten their communities with their own podcast series ...And My Guest Is Richard Speight, each offering original perspectives of COVID-19 life in lockdown. It evolved into Kings of Con: The Podcast, a much-anticipated revival of the Speight-Benedict brand.

Continuing the legacy of Supernatural, the two host a weekly podcast Supernatural: Then and Now (2022), revisiting every episode along with the show's cast & crew as guests.

=== Music and music videos ===
A guitar and bass player, Speight has been a part of the music industry both on and off screen. Speight's music career has been a included collaborations with various artists.

Speight has been in several bands. First, he was in a cover band in high school called The Distortion Hawgs (1986), where he performed lead vocals & bass. He was the guitarist for Fugitive Pope in 1993. While in college he was in the band Strange Neighbors in 1989 with actor and harmonica player Tim Omundson. Speight participates as a guest singer on several albums by singer songwriter & producer Jason Manns– Christmas with Friends (2014), Covers with Friends (2016), and Recovering with Friends (2018). The highest ranking of collaborations with Manns include the chart debut at #16 on iTunes for Covers with Friends and peaked #12 for Recovering with Friends on Billboard. Speight released his debut album with a country band "Dick Jr. & The Volunteers" called The Dance and How to Do It (2019) produced by Manns.

Speight is a frequent guest performer at Saturday Night Special concerts by the indie rock band Louden Swain. Along with the cast of Supernatural, a live recording album of the same name was released by Louden Swain in 2017. The album made several music charts - Billboard chart was #1 on Heatseekers West North Central, #13 on Heatseekers, and #40 on Independent Albums, and iTunes highest ranking at #78 in the U.S. ; He is also a contributor to album Sky Alive by the same band. As an actor, he has been featured in music video for two of Slayer's trilogy You Against You and Pride in Prejudice, showcasing his strength in acting for horror genre

As a director, Speight completed his first music video for Louden Swain's rock song called Bandaged Hand using only an iPhone and spare few hours during his convention tours. As a director, Speight oversees the entire creative process including Sound & Music department for films and television.

== Conventions ==
While he only appeared in five episodes of Supernatural between 2007-2014 (although he made 12 appearances in total by the time Supernatural ended), both Speight's on-screen and off-screen character became very much beloved by fans, which enabled him to stay in close contact with the current cast and crew through his steady contributions at fan conventions (in San Diego Comic-Con, New York Comic Con, and several in Europe, Brazil, and Australia). As of May 2016, he has participated in over 70 fan conventions.

Along with Matt Cohen, Speight became known as the Karaoke Kings as founders of an accessible karaoke event for all, which started with fewer than 10 attendees and has grown to crowds of thousands. Speight also is a singer and bass player with Louden Swain participating in Saturday Night Special concerts.

== Filmography ==
=== Films ===
Year	Film	Role	Director	Notes
1985	Ernest Goes to Camp	Brooks	John R. Cherry III	
1992	Demonic Toys	Andy	Peter Manoogian	Direct-to-video release. Credited as Richard Speight
1997	Speed 2: Cruise Control	"C" Deck Officer	Jan de Bont	
1998	Sugar: The Fall of the West		James Frey	
1999	The Last Big Attraction	Christopher Canby	Hopwood DePree	
2000	In God We Trust	Robert	Jason Reitman	Short film
2000	North Beach	Pete	Richard Speight Jr.	
2000	Dave's Blind Date	Dave	Matthew E. Alper	Short film
2000	Boltneck	Comic Book Salesman	Mitch Marcus	Credited as Richard Speight
2002	Uncle Sam	Frenchie	Jason Reitman	Short film
2004	Mr. Lucke	DJ Tom Bush (voice)	Charles B. Unger	
2005	Love for Rent	George	Shane Edelman	
2006	Thank You for Smoking	Trainee	Jason Reitman	
2006	Open Water 2: Adrift	James	Hans Horn	
2008	American Crude	Morgue Supervision	Craig Sheffer	
2011	Applebox	Bryan Watercress	Rick Page	Short film
2011	3 Blind Saints	Sam	John Eschenbaum	
2013	Noobz	Jeff	Blake Freeman	
2013	The Sidekick	Lucky Lance	Michael J. Weithorn	Short film
2013	Crave	Master Rupert	Charles de Lauzirika	
2014	Hard Crime	Vice Mayor Gray	Lee Ehlers	
2014	La musica provata	Self	Emanuele Sana and Gilbert Spinnato	Documentary
2015	The Evil Gene	Griff Krenshaw	Kathryn F. Taylor	
2016	The Week	Thomas Briggs	Jon Gunn and John W. Mann	Direct-to-video release
2017	Bad, Bad Men	The Bookie	Brad Ellis and Allen C. Gardner	
2017	All About the Money	Rick	Blake Freeman	
2017	Brick Madness	Jeff Tisdale	Justin McAleece	
2018	Death House	Doctor Bennett	B. Harrison Smith	
2019	Driven	Roger	Glenn Payne	
2019	Mama Bear	Skinny Merc.	Matt Cohen	Short film
2019	Home Is Where the Killer Is	James Thomason	Kaila York	
2021	Our Friend	Davey Faucheux	Gabriela Cowperthwaite	
2021	Old Henry	Dugan	Potsy Ponciroli	

=== Television ===
Year(s)	Title	Role(s)	Notes
1982	The Member of the Wedding	Jury Foreman	TV movie
1984	Love Leads the Way: A True Story	Jimmy	TV movie
1988	Goodbye, Miss 4th of July	Young Klansman	TV movie
1989	ABC Afterschool Special	Kenny	S17E7 "Torn Between Two Fathers"
1989	Freddy's Nightmares	Oliver Michaels	S2E4 "Photo Finish"; S2E12 "It's My Party and You'll Die If I Want You To". Credited as Richard Speight
1990	Elvis	Leon	S1E4 "Bel Air Breakdown"
1990	China Beach	Grunt #2	S3E21 "The Gift"
1990	By Dawn's Early Light	SAC Guard	TV movie. Credited as Richard Speight
1990	Matlock	Delivery Boy	S5E9 "The Cover Girl"
1993	Running the Halls	Mark G. "The Shark" Stark	Main role; 13 episodes
1995	Amanda and the Alien	JoJo; Cafe Manager	TV movie
1995	ER	Barinski	S2E2 "Summer Run". Credited as Richard Speight
1995	Dead Weekend	Rebel #1	TV movie
1995	Maybe This Time	Delivery Boy	S1E8 "Coach Julia"
1995	Out There	Store Clerk	TV movie. Credited as Richard Speight
1995–1996	Night Stand with Dick Dietrick	Lyle Johnson; Pud	S1E15 "One-Night Stand Reunions" (credited as Richard Speight); S2E3 "The Lottery Show"
1996	Campus Cops	Gunther	S1E4 "A Knight's Hard Day"
1996	Party of Five	Miller West	S2E15 "Benefactors"
1996	Hypernauts	Alien Vendor	S1E4 "Battle at Vekara"
1997	Built to Last	Stanley	S1E1 "Pilot"
1997	Menno's Mind	Kal, Menno's Coworker	TV movie
1997–1999	JAG	Lt. Michael Gerter; Warren Toobin	S3E4 "Blind Side"; S4E15 "Rivers' Run"
1998	L.A. Doctors	Carl	S1E10 "Nate Expectations"
1999	Payne	Nick	S1E9 "Uncle Royal and Aunt Connie"
2000	Grown Ups	Guru	S1E13 "Instant Karma"
2001	Band of Brothers	Sgt. Warren "Skip" Muck	Main role; 7 episodes
2001	Sam's Circus	Bedpan	TV movie
2001–2003	The Agency	Lex	Main role; 40 episodes
2004	Come to Papa		S1E1 "The Tire Guy"
2005	Alias	Derek Modell	S4E4 "Ice"
2005	CSI: Miami	Kevin Banks	S3E22 "Vengeance"
2005	Into the West	Rupert Lang	S1E6 "Ghost Dance"
2005	Yes, Dear	Frank	S6E6 "Jimmy from the Block"; S6E8 "Jimmy the Teacher"
2006–2008	Jericho	Bill	21 episodes
2007–2018	Supernatural	Various characters	12 episodes
2008	The Consultants	Oliver	TV movie
2009	Life	Dean Ellis	S2E13 "Re-Entry"
2010	Memphis Beat	Donald	S1E7 "Suspicious Minds"
2010	Look: The Series	Rapist	3 episodes
2011–2012	Justified	Jed Berwind	4 episodes
2012	Longmire	Vacationing Biker	S1E9 "Dogs, Horses and Indians"
2014	CSI: Crime Scene Investigation	Lloyd Bryant	S15E2 "Buzz Kill"
2015–2018	The Hillywood Show	Various characters	3 episodes
2016	Red Carpet Report	Self	S8E202 "Comic Con HQ Showcase"
2016–2017	Kings of Con	Richard Slate	Web series. Main role; 7 episodes
2017	Criminal Minds: Beyond Borders	Robbie Garcia	S2E5 "Made In..."
2017	Still the King	Annoying Record Exec	S2E5 "Showcase Showdown"
2017	Skyward	Sheriff Gary	TV movie
2020	Home Movie: The Princess Bride	Yellin	S1E8 "Chapter Eight: Ultimate Suffering"
2020	The Decameron 2020	Self	S1E13 "Richard Speight Jr. reading Ed Park"
2022	Kung Fu	Leif Winzig	S2E4 "Clementine"; S3E4 "Harmony"
2023	The Winchesters	Loki	S1E8 "Hang On to Your Life"
2025	9-1-1: Lone Star	Reverend Phil	S5E10 "All Who Wander"
2025	Public Domain	Quasimodo (voice)	TV movie

=== Music videos ===
Year	Song	Artist	Director	Role	Notes
2016	"You Against You"	Slayer	B. J. McDonnell	Gunman	
2016	"Pride in Prejudice"	Slayer	B. J. McDonnell	Gunman	

=== Video games ===
Year	Title	Role	Notes
2005	Call of Duty 2	Pvt. Stephen Kelly (voice)	
2005	Call of Duty 2: Big Red One	Pvt. Stephen Kelly (voice)	

=== As a director ===
Year	Title	Notes
2000	North Beach	Co-director, actor
2013	America 101	Director, writer, executive producer
2015–2020	Supernatural	Director; 11 episodes: S11E8 "Just My Imagination"; S12E12 "Stuck in the Middle (With You)"; S12E20 "Twigs & Twine & Tasha Banes"; S13E7 "War of the Worlds"; S13E20 "Unfinished Business"; S14E2 "Gods and Monsters"; S14E6 "Optimism"; S15E5 "Proverbs 17:3"; S15E8 "Our Father, Who Aren't in Heaven"; S15E12 "Galaxy Brain"; S15E18 "Despair"
2016–2017	Kings of Con	Director; 7 episodes
2019–2021	Lucifer	Director; 4 episodes: S4E7 "Devil is as Devil Does"; S5E6 "BlueBallz"; S5E13 "A Little Harmless Stalking"
2021–2023	Kung Fu	Director; 6 episodes: S1E10 "Choice"; S2E4 "Clementine"; S2E7 "The Alchemist"; S2E12 "Alliance"; S3E4 "Harmony"; S3E12 "Loss"
2021–2023	Walker	Director; 3 episodes: S1E17 "Dig"; S2E2 "The One Who Got Away"; S3E14 "False Flag: Part One"
2022	The Winchesters	Director; 1 episode: S1E7 "Reflections"
2024	Dead Boy Detectives	Director; 1 episode: S1E7 "The Case of the Very Long Stairway"
