= Briana Buckmaster =

Canadian actress (born 1982)

- Buckmaster in 2026
- Born: July 15, 1982 (age 44); Moose Jaw, Saskatchewan, Canada
- Other name: Brianna Buckmaster
- Education: Grant MacEwan University
- Occupations: Actress; singer
- Spouse: José Rosales-Lopez
- Children: 1

Briana Buckmaster (born July 15, 1982) is a Canadian actress and singer best known for her portrayal of Donna Hanscum in Supernatural. She released her debut album, Begin, in 2018.

== Early life ==
Buckmaster was born in Moose Jaw, Saskatchewan. She attended Grant MacEwan University where she received her diploma in Theatre Arts.

== Career ==
=== Acting ===
Buckmaster is best known for her portrayal of the recurring character Sheriff Donna Hanscum on The CW's Supernatural in seasons 9-11 and 13–15. She was set to appear as a main cast member on the spinoff Wayward Sisters, but that show was ultimately not picked up by the network. Since 2018, she has portrayed Lil' Mama on Chip and Potato. Since 2020, she has portrayed Fretta Van Dango on Dorg Van Dango. She appeared in an episode of Kung Fu as Tamra in 2022, alongside fellow Supernatural alum Richard Speight Jr.

=== Theater ===
She has also performed in several theater shows including On The Banks of the Nut, Vidalia, Mother of the Year, A Rocky Night For His Nibs, Witness to a Conga, The Adulteress, and Saint Albert all of which are by Stewart Lemoine of the Teatro la Quindicina theater. She was nominated for the Elizabeth Sterling Haynes Awards in 2012 for her role in The Adulteress.

=== Music ===
She released her debut album, Begin, in 2018, which features Rob Benedict of Louden Swain and was produced by Jason Manns. The album peaked at number 3 on the Billboard Top Blues Album. She is featured on Jason Mann's Recovering with Friends 2018 album. She released a cover of Carry on Wayward Son with Billy Moran in 2019.

== Personal life ==
Buckmaster is married to José Rosales-Lopez. They have one daughter together.

== Filmography ==
=== Film ===
Year	Title	Role	Notes
2004	My Pet Cowboy	Passerby	Short
2008	Repo! The Genetic Opera	Sherrie Alviso	
2009	Life in a Fish Bowl	Katie Crustfield	Short; Credited as Brianna Buckmaster
2013	Baby Sellers	Tracey	TV movie; Credited as Brianna Buckmaster
2014	In My Dreams	Shopping Woman #2	TV movie
2015	Signed, Sealed, Delivered: From Paris with Love	Anchor Woman	
2015	The Weirdo Hero	Security Guard Jules	Short
2015	A Country Wedding	Monica	TV movie
2015	R.L. Stine's Monsterville: Cabinet of Souls	Newscaster	
2017	Devil in the Dark	Sophie	
2019	Homeowner	Mary	Short
2019	Mama Bear	Sweet nurse	Short

=== Television ===
Year	Title	Role	Notes
2013	Cedar Cove	Court Clerk	
2013	Arrow	Protester	
2014-2020	Supernatural	Donna Hanscum	7 episodes; Seasons 9–11, 13–15; 2 Nominations with 1 win for a Leo Award for Best Guest Performance by a Female in a Dramatic Series
2019	Chip and Potato	Little Momma	Main cast; Voice Over; 40 episodes
2020	Dorg Van Dango	Fretta Van Dango	Main cast; Voice Over; 48 episodes
2022	Kung Fu	Tamra	
2023	Creating Christmas	Liz Young	TV film

== Discography ==
- Begin (2018)
