= Castiel (Supernatural) =

Character from American TV series Supernatural

- Supernatural character
- Misha Collins as Castiel
- First appearance: "Lazarus Rising" (2008)
- Last appearance: "Despair" (2020)
- Created by: Eric Kripke
- Portrayed by: Misha Collins

In-universe information
- Nicknames: Cas; Clarence, Unicorn (by Meg); Feathers (by Crowley); Steve (Human Castiel)
- Species: Angel (Seraph); God
- Family: Jack Kline (nephew; dependant); Angels (siblings); Chuck (creator/father)

Castiel (/ˌkæstiˈɛl/; nicknamed "Cas") is a fictional character portrayed by Misha Collins on The CW's American fantasy television series Supernatural. An Angel of the Lord, he first appears in the fourth season and is used to introduce the theme of Christian theology to the series. In the series, Castiel brings Dean Winchester back from Hell and frequently helps him and his brother, Sam, in their battles with various demons and angels along the way. During his travels with the Winchesters, Castiel develops friendships with both men. As an angel, he possesses a number of supernatural abilities, including the ability to kill demons.

Initially, the character demonstrates complete devotion to God and little emotion. However, his interactions and experiences with Dean and Sam, as well as certain revelations about God and his fellow angels, have a humanizing effect on him. This, despite the stress and harm it causes his character, allows him to develop an independent will as the series progresses and helps the show address topics related to free will.

Unlike the stereotypical portrayal of television angels, Castiel does not always help people, and is willing, at least when he is first introduced, to kill innocents if his superiors deem it necessary. Collins originally read for the part of a demon, as series creator Eric Kripke did not want fans to find out that angels were being introduced to the series. Collins prepared for the role by reading the Book of Revelation and based his portrayal on his younger brother. Critics and fans have responded highly favorably to the character. In response, the show's creators expanded his role in the series, upgrading him to a main cast member in the fifth and sixth seasons. After being a special guest star in the seventh and eighth seasons, Collins was upgraded once again to regular cast member status through seasons 9 to 15.

== Plot ==
=== Arrival on Earth ===
At the end of the third season of Supernatural, Dean Winchester is in Hell after being killed by the hellhounds of the demonic antagonist Lilith. In the season four premiere "Lazarus Rising", the angel Castiel is introduced as the one who brought Dean back from Hell and resurrected him. Because merely perceiving his actual form typically results in blindness, he takes a human host – James "Jimmy" Novak, a "devout man" who prayed for it – to communicate with Dean, and tells him that he has been brought back because God has work for him. Lilith is breaking the 66 seals in order to free Lucifer, and Dean must stop her.

Castiel continues to appear throughout the season, at one point sending Dean back in time and later tasking him and his brother Sam with stopping witches from breaking another seal. He returns with fellow angel Uriel at the end of the episode "I Know What You Did Last Summer", seeking to kill Anna Milton, a fallen angel with the ability to "hear" the communications between angels. In the following episode, "Heaven and Hell", Anna uses an ancient Enochian sigil to send the angels away, though they manage to track them down later. Once there, Castiel expresses regret at having to kill Anna. Before they can carry out their duty, however, they are confronted by the demon Alastair and two of his minions. A fight ensues, and Castiel is nearly defeated in the battle by Alastair. He is saved by Dean, and they in turn are rescued when Anna regains her powers. Although Uriel nearly vents his frustration on Dean, Castiel stops him, and the two leave.

Castiel later becomes suspicious of Uriel and confronts him in "On the Head of a Pin". Uriel admits he and certain other angels are now working together to free Lucifer, having grown weary of never hearing from God and jealous of His favoritism for humanity. He asks Castiel to join him, but Castiel refuses and attacks him. Uriel eventually overpowers Castiel, but is killed by Anna before he can strike the finishing blow. During this time, the orders he is getting from Heaven of questionable morality and the influence of Anna cause him to start to have doubts about Heaven's plans. He later returns in "The Monster at the End of This Book" to explain Chuck's role as a Prophet and later when Dean calls him to help save Sam. Castiel informs Dean he cannot interfere due to how important Prophets are, but he impresses upon Dean how the archangel protecting a Prophet will intervene if said Prophet is in trouble to secretly let him know a way to save Sam.

=== Jimmy Novak alone ===
In "The Rapture", Castiel enters Dean's dreams and arranges a meeting to tell him something important. However, when Sam and Dean go to meet him, they instead find Jimmy, Castiel's vessel, who claims to have little memory of his life as a vessel. Anna theorizes Castiel must have angered his superiors, prompting him to be taken back to Heaven. When Jimmy is shot at the end of the episode trying to save his family from demons, Castiel returns, taking Jimmy's daughter Claire as his new vessel. After the demons are killed, a dying Jimmy begs Castiel to take him back as a host so his daughter will not have to go through what he did, and the angel acquiesces. Dean then asks him what he needed to tell him, but Castiel coldly replies his loyalty is to Heaven, not to mankind or to him.

=== Servant of Heaven ===
In "When the Levee Breaks", Castiel has Dean take the oath of allegiance to God and His angels, to which Dean agrees under the impression it will keep Sam safe. Later in the episode, Castiel releases Sam, who is on detox from Ruby's demon blood, from Bobby's Panic Room. When Anna confronts him about his actions, other angels appear and capture her.

With Sam closing in on Lilith, Castiel and Zachariah imprison Dean within an idyllic waiting room, where he will be made comfortable until the time comes for him to play his role in stopping the Apocalypse. Dean refuses to remain idle, and continually requests to be able to see Sam, which is denied. Once Dean discovers the angels are allowing the Apocalypse to happen, he implores for Castiel to help him stop the final seal from being broken. Though Castiel refuses at first, he returns ready to help not long after. He takes Dean to see the prophet Chuck for information on Sam. Their presence does not fall in line with Chuck's Gospel, so the Archangel Raphael begins to descend. Castiel sends Dean to Sam, remaining behind to hold back the archangel and any others who might come. He is subsequently killed, with his host's body being blown to pieces.

=== Fall to Earth ===
However, Castiel later returns – still in Jimmy Novak's body – in the fifth-season premiere, "Sympathy for the Devil", killing two fellow angels in order to save Sam and Dean. He is uncertain as to how he was resurrected, but alludes to Zachariah it may have been God's doing. After ordering Zachariah away, Castiel carves Enochian sigils into Sam and Dean's ribs to hide them from all angels, including Lucifer. Castiel later returns to the brothers in "Good God Y'All!", and reveals his plans to find God. He borrows Dean's amulet, as it burns hot in God's presence, and departs. He has also been completely cut off from Heaven as a result of his rebellion and has lost some of his powers as a result, including his ability to heal injuries. He remains on Earth hunting for God, although acquires a cell phone so that the Winchesters can call for his aid when dealing with particularly challenging cases, such as their discovery of the Antichrist or their latest confrontation with the Trickster (who is revealed to be the lost archangel Gabriel).

In "Abandon All Hope...", Castiel helps the Winchesters retrieve the Colt and joins them on their hunt for Lucifer. However, he ventures off after discovering hundreds of Reapers are already in the town, hoping to discover what has called them there. He soon becomes imprisoned by Lucifer, who tries to tempt Castiel into joining him, pointing out they are both targets of heaven, but Castiel refuses. He later manages to free himself, but finds he no longer has the power to kill demons. After Sam and Dean fail in their attempt to kill the Devil, Castiel teleports them to safety. After exhausting most of his remaining power to take Sam and Dean back in time to save their parents from renegade angel Anna, Castiel aids the Winchesters in their battle with Famine, the Horseman of the Apocalypse – the brothers having already defeated War – but his weakened powers render him susceptible to Famine's influence, Famine attacking Jimmy's hunger for red meat to make Castiel more interested in eating burgers than actually fighting. When the brothers are killed by vengeful hunters in "Dark Side of the Moon", Castiel – unable to return to Heaven – briefly communicates with them. He tasks them with finding the angel Joshua, who communicates directly with God. Although Joshua reveals God is alive, he claims He is apathetic to the Apocalypse; having saved the brothers and Castiel, God feels He has done enough. When relayed to Castiel, his hopes and faith are shattered, leading him to drink heavily in the subsequent episode "99 Problems" when Sam summons him for answers about the actions of the people in a town. Castiel reveals that they are dealing with the Whore of Babylon and provides the stake that can kill her, but as he is no longer a true servant of Heaven, is unable to do it himself. He gets Pastor Gideon so they can have him do it and tries to hold the Whore in place so the Pastor can stab her. However, she casts a spell that causes him great pain and knocks him out of the fight. In the end, Dean stabs her with the stake, identifying himself as a true servant of heaven.

=== Powerless ===
In "Point of No Return", Castiel helps Sam to keep Dean from becoming Michael's vessel. He leaves after hearing a signal from the angels, and finds a resurrected Adam Milligan – Sam and Dean's half-brother who had been previously killed by ghouls. When Dean escapes and tries to contact the angels, Castiel finds him, and angrily attacks him for making Castiel's rebelling against Heaven worthless. Later, he carves a banishing sigil into his own chest and activates it in the presence of multiple angels in order to clear the way for Sam and Dean to attack Zachariah and save Adam. The effects of the sigil send him onto a fishing boat, now completely human. Despite his lack of power, he is able to defeat the Horseman Pestilence using what appears to be what little is left of his angelic strength, and assists Bobby and Sam in preventing nationwide distribution of the Croatoan virus.

In the fifth-season finale, "Swan Song", Castiel loses faith after Sam fails to overpower Lucifer when he possesses him and suggests they get drunk and wait for the end to come. When Dean refuses to give up, Castiel and Bobby follow him and Castiel uses a Molotov cocktail of Holy Fire to temporarily banish Michael to buy Dean time to try to reach Sam. Angry that Castiel attacked his brother, Lucifer obliterates Castiel with a snap of his fingers. After Sam and Dean avert the Apocalypse, Castiel is resurrected once more by God, now more powerful than ever as a seraphim. He heals Dean's injuries and resurrects Bobby and reminds Dean that he got what he wanted: no Apocalypse, no Paradise, just more of the same. Castiel then heads back to heaven to restore order and become its new leader, believing it to be in chaos since Sam trapped Michael in Lucifer's Cage as well.

=== Post-Apocalyptic alliances ===
A year after the Apocalypse, Castiel returns to Earth in "The Third Man" to get Sam and Dean's help to find the Staff of Moses, which, along with many other weapons of Heaven, has been stolen during the war. They soon discover that the angel Balthazar has stolen it and sold pieces of it to people in exchange for their souls. They confront Balthazar, but are interrupted by Raphael. Before Raphael is able to get his revenge against Castiel, Balthazar destroys Raphael's vessel and sends him back to Heaven. After trapping Balthazar within a ring of ignited holy oil and forcing him to restore the souls he has taken, Castiel sets him free, claiming his debt has been paid off.

In "Family Matters", Castiel returns to "diagnose" Sam by asking him several questions. Sam, still dizzy and unsure of what is going on after being knocked unconscious by Dean, reveals that he no longer sleeps and has become a better hunter. Castiel has an idea of what is wrong and decides to read Sam's soul by reaching inside him, and the truth is finally revealed: that Sam has no soul, and it was locked in the cage with Lucifer. Both Dean and Castiel are unsure whether Sam is still Sam without his soul, but they let Sam go and Castiel heals his wounds from being beaten by Dean.

In "Caged Heat", Sam tries to trick Castiel into coming to Earth to help the brothers get Sam's soul back. When he comes, Sam threatens Castiel saying that if he does not help, then he will hunt him down and kill him. Despite knowing Sam never could, he helps them. Later, while Sam and Dean are doing research, Castiel discovers porn on TV; when Dean asks why he was watching porn, he replies, "It was there."

Castiel later discovers Sam and Dean are working with a demon called Meg, whom he refers to as an abomination. When Crowley admits that he cannot get Sam's soul back, Castiel burns Crowley's human remains.

At the end of the episode Castiel explains to Sam and Dean that the celestial war is not going well for him and he would rather be on Earth with them, but leaves anyway to continue fighting, but promises to take care of Crowley's captured monsters first. After acquiring the holy weapons from Balthazar in "The French Mistake", Castiel suggests that he now has a military advantage in the war. Unfortunately, this advantage seems limited; he orders Balthazar in "My Heart Will Go On" to save the Titanic, spawning 50,000 new souls to empower his side. However, Fate works to undo the impossible births and begins killing them. Once the brothers encounter the string of odd deaths Fate takes this opportunity to eliminate them due to their part of undoing the destined Apocalypse. This forces Castiel to concede the loss and re-sink the Titanic.

In "Frontierland", Sam and Dean call for Castiel to send them back in time as they have learned that the ashes of a Phoenix can kill Eve and that Samuel Colt killed one in the past with The Colt. Rachel, Castiel's lieutenant comes instead and berates the boys for only calling for him when they need something of him, but Castiel arrives himself and sends Rachel away. Castiel is able to send Dean and Sam back in time, but warns them that he has to retrieve them in 24 hours or they will be stuck in the past forever and tells Bobby to pray for him when the time comes. While waiting, Rachel approaches him about his plans and attacks him. Castiel kills her, but is left weakened by a stab wound she managed to inflict on him first. Castiel manages to teleport to Bobby's and draws a sigil to hide himself from the other angels before passing out. He wakes in time to retrieve the Winchesters, but his weakened state prevents this so he is forced to draw power from Bobby's soul. While Dean killed the Phoenix, Castiel brought them back before they could gather the ashes so it all appears for nothing and he lacks the power to send them back. Luckily, Samuel Colt collected the ashes and sent a package with them to be delivered to Bobby's after the boys return.

In "Mommy Dearest", it is discovered that there is a possibility Crowley may have faked his death and might still be alive; suggesting that perhaps Castiel had burned the wrong bones by mistake. Eve reveals this to Sam and Dean when they try to hunt her down. During the hunt, Eve is able to suppress Castiel's powers as she is older than him. After Dean kills Eve, Castiel's powers return and he kills all of her monsters with a blast of white light before transporting the group to the home of the uncle of two young boys who were turned into monsters. There, they find them dead, having been killed by demons, and Castiel promises to look into Crowley's possible survival to find out for sure if he's dead or not. However, Castiel is instead seen with a very alive Crowley who states that he is "tired of cleaning up after [Castiel's] messes", implying that Castiel had full knowledge of burning the wrong bones and that both he and Crowley have some sort of agreement between them and/or may be working together as partners.

In "The Man Who Would Be King", it is revealed that Castiel was the one who partially raised Sam from Hell, though due to the complication of the cage it was impossible to retrieve his soul, and that he has made a deal with Crowley in a desperate attempt to win the war. Sam and Dean also learn of his partnership with Crowley when he slips up and reveals he is spying on them.

In "Let it Bleed", Castiel is enraged to learn that Lisa and Ben Braeden have been kidnapped by Crowley and tries to get him to reveal where they are to no avail. Castiel saves Dean from a demon and tries and fails to convince him to back off. Later, after Lisa is mortally wounded by a demon possessing her in an attempt to force Dean not to exorcise her, Castiel arrives at the hospital and without being asked, heals her wounds and at Dean's request, erases all of her and her son Ben's memories of Dean. He does this as a final act of friendship towards Dean though both admit it does not change the fact that they are now enemies. Castiel also spends the episode one step ahead of Bobby investigating H.P. Lovecraft's opening of Purgatory in an attempt to find a way to open it himself.

=== Godhood ===
In "The Man Who Knew Too Much", Castiel tricks Crowley and Raphael, eventually absorbing the souls from Purgatory. He demonstrates his new power by killing Raphael with a simple snap of his fingers. While talking to Dean, who unsuccessfully begs him to give up the power, Sam sneaks up behind them and attempts to kill him with an angelic blade by stabbing Castiel in the back, but it has no effect. Castiel removes the blade, explains that he is no longer an angel, declaring himself their new God. He then glances at the three hunters before delivering an ultimatum: to profess their own loyalty and love unto him, or be destroyed.

In "Meet the New Boss", Castiel begins exacting his new supremacy over the planet, working miracles and punishing religious hypocrites alike. However, when Castiel's vessel begins to become damaged and he begins to lose control of his power, Death reveals that he also absorbed creatures known as Leviathans from Purgatory. The Leviathans will destroy him if they are not released. Castiel seeks out the Winchesters' help, and reopens the portal with Death's assistance. Although the souls are returned, the Leviathans evade reentering Purgatory and take control of Castiel's vessel. In "Hello, Cruel World", the vessel begins to quickly break down. The Leviathans are forced to leave, dispersing into the local water supply nearby and leaving behind only Castiel's trench coat.

=== Return to madness ===
In "The Born-Again Identity", it is revealed that Castiel survived. After the Leviathans left him, he made his way out of the river, naked, and ran into his future wife Daphne. However, the experience renders Castiel amnesic, but with his angelic powers intact. Going by the name "Emanuel", Castiel used his powers to heal people, though he did not know where that ability and his power to see demon's true faces came from. After Sam is committed to a mental hospital as a result of the hallucinations of Lucifer he is suffering due to Castiel breaking his "mental wall", Dean searches for "Emanuel" and kills a demon that is holding his wife hostage. Castiel agrees to help Dean who does not tell him who he really is, but mentions what "Cas" had done to Sam. The two are joined by Meg, but upon reaching the hospital, find demons surrounding the entrance. As Castiel is the only one who can take them all down, Dean is forced to tell him the truth about who he really is and insists he has the power to kill the demons. Castiel manages to summon his power to kill demons and kills all of them, but doing so restores his memories. Castiel shows remorse for his previous actions and initially wants to leave, but Dean is able to convince him to help by giving him back his trench coat. Castiel finds Sam in time to save him from a demon torturing him to death with electro-shock therapy and tries to restore his mental wall, but cannot as it is completely gone. Feeling sorry for what he had done, Castiel transfers the problem to himself and is haunted by visions of Lucifer like Sam was. Castiel is committed to the mental hospital, but is safe from the demons as only Meg knows he's alive and she takes a job at the hospital, presumably to look after him. In "Party On, Garth", Dean calls Meg and she reveals that Castiel's in the same condition, which Sam feels guilty about.

In "Reading is Fundamental", Castiel is awakened when the Word of God – a tablet with information inscribed by an angel as dictated by God – is found by Sam and Dean. Although his torment has driven him insane, he explains that taking on Sam's pain has helped relieve some of his past burdens. He then explains what the Word of God is, but is unable to read it. Two angels from his former garrison arrive in pursuit of Kevin, a prophet who was awakened by the Word of God and drawn to it. The angel Hester tries to kill Castiel out of anger for his past actions, but she is instead killed by Meg. The other angel offers Castiel the chance to return to Heaven with him, but Castiel declines, explaining that he feels he no longer belongs there. The other angel then leaves, taking Kevin away to safety. Castiel comments to the Winchesters that he finds it amazing that he does not know what he is going to do next, and teleports away after giving them his blood.

In "Survival of the Fittest", after finding his garrison wiped out, Castiel has Meg take him to the Winchesters where he explains what he has discovered. Crowley arrives and is furious to see him, but Castiel no longer has a wish to fight and when Crowley realizes he's insane, he decides to put off his feud with Castiel for a time when he's sane again. Crowley, after giving them his blood, disappears but tells them Castiel can help them kill Dick. Castiel refuses to help as he does not want to fight and after he disappears to retrieve a board game, Meg explains that since Castiel had the Leviathans within him, he is able to tell them apart even in their human forms and can pick out the real Dick Roman. Castiel watches as Sam and Dean burn Bobby's flask and put him at rest and later takes Dean to where he has stored the Impala and agrees to help. Castiel, Sam and Dean infiltrate Sucrocorp thanks to a distraction from Meg and he and Dean confront Dick Roman in the labs. Dick throws Castiel across the room when he tries to attack, but after Dean fails to kill Dick, Castiel holds his head in place from behind allowing Dean to stab Dick through the neck with the weapon, killing him. As a result of this, Castiel and Dean are sucked into Purgatory with Dick's soul and after letting Dean know this and that they are more likely to die than get out, Castiel disappears, leaving Dean alone.

=== Out of Purgatory ===
In "We Need To Talk About Kevin", Dean escapes Purgatory with the help of the vampire Benny, but Castiel is not with him. He later tells Sam that things got hairy near the end and that Castiel did not make it, that he "let go". While Dean does not elaborate, he is clearly affected by this. In a flashback scene, Dean is shown looking for Castiel in Purgatory, interrogating a vampire for his location. As a result, he meets Benny and only agrees to Benny's deal to get out if they find Castiel first and help him escape too. Castiel appears in flashbacks in the following episode, where he reveals that he fled Dean to keep him safe from the Leviathans and other monsters that are angry at Castiel, but Dean refuses to leave Purgatory without Castiel. When talking with another angel at an auction for the second Word of God tablet, Dean again states that Castiel did not make it out of Purgatory. He later escapes with the aid of an army of angels sent to rescue him – having initially remained behind as penance for his actions to stop a duo of Leviathans that were trying to attack Dean and Benny as they left Purgatory – but the other angels not only erase his memory that they were responsible for his escape, but also erase his memory of their subsequent 'check-ins' to discuss the Winchesters' actions, with Castiel forced to tell them about the Winchesters' progress in the search for the tablet. Apparently back to full power, Castiel helps the Winchesters save Kevin from Crowley – who has been abducting future Prophets to try to find another means of reading the Word of God tablet – and destroy the tablet to prevent Crowley using it, retaining half of the tablet while Crowley flees with the other half. Afterwards, in "Hunteri Heroici", Castiel cuts off his ability to listen into the other angels and decides to become a full-time hunter to avoid facing the other angels about what he has done. Castiel proves instrumental in solving the case, using his abilities to enter the mind of a man with reality warping powers, allowing Sam to bring him back to reality with a speech about not running from it. Later, at the request of the man, Fred, Castiel strips him of his powers so he is no longer a danger to anyone though it leaves him mentally damaged. Castiel, having listened to Sam's speech about running from reality as well as Fred, decides to return to Heaven to try to make up for what he did, but is forbidden by Naomi, the angel who ordered his rescue. Instead, Castiel stays to watch out for Fred for a while, but accepts that he can no longer run from what he has done.

In "Torn and Frayed", as his penance, Castiel has turned back on his "angel radio" and travels around helping people who have need of help or healing. He demonstrates this by healing a sick infant that will not stop crying. After getting a distress call from Samandriel, Naomi summons Castiel to rescue the angel. Castiel enlists Dean's help and repeatedly wonders where Sam is, unaware that Sam and Dean are currently not getting along. After getting the ingredients for a "demon bomb", Castiel gets Sam as they will need all the help they can get to rescue Samandriel and yells at Sam and Dean for their behavior. At the warehouse, Castiel tells Sam and Dean what symbols to neutralize and where so he can enter and gives Sam his sword so he has a weapon against demons. After Sam and Dean clear the way, Castiel enters, but is weakened by the other sigils in the building. Samandriel's screams cause him to remember being tied down by Naomi who approaches his eye with a mysterious instrument and is unable to help Sam and Dean in breaking into the room where Samandriel is. After they get in, Castiel frees Samandriel while Sam and Dean deal with the demons guarding him and takes the other angel outside. There, Samandriel begs for Castiel not to return him to Heaven and tries to warn him that "they" are controlling him. Before Samandriel can explain, Naomi forces Castiel to kill him for being a "traitor". Castiel is horrified by this, but Naomi reveals that Samandriel telling Crowley about the angel Word of God tablet puts all in angels in danger and Castiel is a hero. Under her orders, he claims to Sam and Dean that he was forced to kill Samandriel in self-defense and that he is taking him back to Heaven to put him to rest (in reality so Naomi can determine just how much he broke), but his weird behavior and the fact that his eye starts bleeding arouses Sam and Dean's suspicions that he is being controlled.

=== On the run from Heaven ===
In "Goodbye Stranger", Castiel has been completely brainwashed by Naomi and has killed thousands of copies of Dean ruthlessly. Castiel is sent to find the angel tablet and tortures and kills the demons also looking for it, drawing Sam and Dean's attention. Sam and Dean track down someone who knows the location of one of Lucifer's Crypts where the angel tablet is, and in the ensuing scuffle, Sam ends up in trouble. Castiel saves Sam and captures one of the demons, claiming under Naomi's orders that he is searching for the second half of the demon tablet and that the demons are searching for a parchment that will allow them to translate it without a Prophet. Castiel tortures the demon who tells them where to find Meg, but kills her before she can reveal the truth to Sam and Dean. Castiel heads off alone and rescues Meg who explains what the demons really want. While Naomi initially wants her killed to prevent that, Castiel is able to make a case to keep her alive. The group then go to the warehouse where the crypt is and before heading inside with Dean, Castiel reveals that Sam is damaged by his trials on a level that even Castiel cannot fix. Castiel and Dean locate the angel tablet and Castiel has to have Dean get it as it is warded against angels. However, Naomi orders Castiel to kill Dean and though he fights it, he has no control over his actions. As he is about to kill him, Dean manages to break through to Castiel's heart and he breaks free of Naomi's influence. He picks up the angel tablet which completely severs Naomi's connection to and control over him. Castiel heals Dean and explains what happened, but senses that he must now protect the tablet from everyone, even Dean. Castiel is later seen traveling on a bus to an unknown destination with the tablet. Despite losing the tablet, Naomi is somewhat satisfied as according to her, Castiel is doing what he is supposed to be doing. Naomi later comes to Dean. In an attempt to gain his trust, presumably because she knows Castiel is one of his weak spots, she lies to Dean about Castiel and claims that he misinterpreted everything she has done and is still insane. Dean, of course, does not believe her. Despite this, Castiel is eventually captured by Naomi's forces, but the angel tablet is claimed by Crowley after one of Naomi's angels betrays their location, although this gives Castiel time to escape and reunite with the Winchesters after killing the angel guarding him.

=== Metatron's betrayal ===
With Heaven in chaos, Metatron (the Scribe of God, recently rediscovered) convinces Castiel that they must seal the gates of Heaven to force the angels together to make peace. The first trial is to cut out the heart of a nephilim, the child of a human and an angel, which Castiel is forced to kill when the selected target attacks him. They manage to complete the second trial (retrieving the bow of a cupid), but Metatron subsequently reveals that his true intentions are to exile all the angels from Heaven for forcing him to leave Heaven ages ago. He takes Castiel's grace from him as the third ingredient for this spell, leaving Castiel human and banished to Earth before the other angels begin to fall as well.

=== Back to humanity ===
With the angels expelled from Heaven, many of them begin searching for Castiel, whom they believe is responsible, and was knowingly working to enact Metatron's plans. Castiel decides he wants to help his fallen brethren find "direction" when he encounters an angel named Hael who requests his guidance. When Castiel contacts the Winchesters, however, Dean tells him to leave Hael and make his way the Men of Letters bunker where he will be safe from the angels hunting him. Following this, Castiel attempts to leave Hael behind but is captured by her instead whereby she reveals her plans to possess him. Castiel escapes and kills Hael then continues to make his way to the bunker, abandoning his usual attire along the way. Castiel is nearly caught several times by the angels searching for him and gets a tattoo that will ward him against angels. In response, the angels send freelance Reapers after him and he is eventually caught by one of them. The Reaper tortures Castiel and kills him when the Winchesters show up to rescue him. Dean has the angel secretly possessing Sam heal Castiel and takes him back to the bunker but later asks him to leave when Ezekiel, the angel inside Sam, requests it, potentially threatening Sam's life if Dean does not comply.

Castiel gets a job at a gas station and attempts to adjust to his new life as a human. He helps Dean hunt a rogue angel that is killing people in emotional pain, but later prays for help when Dean sends him away for the second time on Ezekiel's orders. Castiel is found by the neutral angel Muriel who heard his prayer. Muriel agrees to provide information but the two are captured by angels that have been trailing Muriel. Castiel and Muriel are taken to the anarchist angel Malachi, the leader of one side of the angel civil war (the other side being headed by the angel Bartholomew), and tortured for information on Metatron. Muriel is killed in the process.

=== Stolen Grace ===
Eventually, Malachi leaves Castiel with the angel Theo who tells Castiel he wants to defect to Metatron's side. Castiel tricks Theo into releasing him and steals his Grace, transforming Castiel into an angel once more and at least restoring his powers. Castiel calls Dean and tells him that while he was held captive by Malachi he learned that the angel Ezekiel is dead and so the angel possessing Sam must be an impostor.

After being contacted by Dean, Castiel, now wearing a new suit and trench coat and driving a stolen car as he can no longer teleport, returns to the bunker where he comes up with the plan to have Crowley help expel Gadreel from Sam. Castiel knocks Gadreel out and comforts Dean when the torture they have Crowley perform to bring forth Sam's mind proves too much for Dean. Castiel is furious to learn that the angel possessing Sam is actually Gadreel, blaming him for all the evil in the universe, but Dean calms him down. When Gadreel proves resistant to their efforts to expel him, Dean tries to have Castiel possess Sam to let him know of the situation but he cannot without Sam's permission, and furthermore has no way to gain it due to Sam's mind being kept under by Gadreel. Crowley agrees to possess Sam instead in exchange for his freedom and though Castiel is reluctant, he removes Sam's anti-possession tattoo. The plan works and Sam expels Gadreel. After leaving Crowley to deal with Abaddon, Castiel heals Sam's injuries from the torture and informs him he can finish his healing from the Trials over time as Gadreel did most of the job. He remains behind with Sam as Dean leaves on his own.

=== Facing Metatron ===
With his angelic powers partially restored, Castiel sets out to try and stop the angelic civil war. Having killed Bartholomew in self-defence, Castiel takes command of most of the Earth-bound angels, but finds himself opposed by Metatron, who is rallying angels to his side with the intention of painting Castiel as the villain of the piece. Although Castiel learns that his stolen grace will kill him eventually, he refuses Metatron's offer to side with him, eventually convincing Gadreel to ally with him in opposing Metatron's attempt to stage a coup of Heaven even as Metatron tricks the other angels into follow him by presenting Castiel as a despot willing to destroy everything to win the war, convincing angels to 'suicide bomb' themselves and claim that Castiel told them to do it. Having gained access to Heaven's 'back door' after Gadreel sacrifices himself, Castiel defeats Metatron and throws him into Heaven's prison.

=== Lack of Grace ===
Despite his defeat of Metatron and access to Heaven having been restored, Castiel continues to face challenges on a personal and large scale, as some angels prefer to remain on Earth and his stolen Grace continues to consume him. Although Metatron has hinted that he may be able to help Castiel with a remaining fragment of his original Grace, Castiel has rejected the option of making a deal with Metatron to save his own life. Sam and Dean remain ignorant of Castiel's fate, although Crowley is aware of Castiel's condition, at one point killing another angel to transfer her Grace to Castiel so that Castiel could help Sam cure the now-demonic Dean after he was transformed by the Mark of Cain.

When Hannah decides to return to Heaven to give her vessel a chance at returning to her life, Castiel is prompted to look up Jimmy's daughter Claire Novak, revealing that Jimmy has been dead and in Heaven ever since Jimmy's body was destroyed during his first confrontation with Raphael. Although Claire initially resents Castiel's return to her life, she comes to accept him and the Winchesters after they save her from being sold as a prostitute by a man she believed had been helping her.

=== Grace restored ===
Seeking to help Dean find a cure for the Mark of Cain, Castiel breaks Metatron out of Heaven and removes his Grace so that the Winchesters can interrogate him. Although he fails to provide any new information, Metatron is able to lead Castiel to the library where he hid the remaining fragments of Castiel's Grace. With his powers restored, Castiel helps Claire find her long-lost mother, but although Amelia sacrifices herself to save Claire, Claire accepts that the Winchesters and Castiel meant well, even speculating that she will become a Hunter herself. When Rowena – Crowley's long-lost mother – casts a spell to remove the Mark, she also casts a spell that causes Castiel to attack Crowley while she escapes, leaving Castiel driven by a greater rage to the point that he kills two angels until Rowena is forced to cure him.

=== Lucifer's Vessel ===
Faced with the threat of the Darkness – revealed over the course of the series to be God's "sister", sacrificed to create the world – Castiel agrees to act as Lucifer's vessel when Lucifer claims to be the only one with the power to defeat the Darkness since God is absent and all other archangels are dead or insane. After killing Rowena, apparently the only person capable of reopening the Cage, Lucifer spends some time reestablishing his power base in hell while acting as Castiel to interact with the Winchesters and follow their research into Amara, but his true identity is revealed after the Winchesters attempt to travel back in time to recover a Hand of God from a submarine before it sank in 1943. Castiel is able to regain control long enough to explain the situation to Sam and to stop Lucifer from killing him. Dean subsequently returns and banishes Lucifer, vowing to find a way to free Castiel from his control. Crowley, forced to act as Lucifer's slave, is forced on the run after he fails to kill Lucifer with another salvaged Hand of God. The Winchesters manage to get through to Castiel when preparing for a new confrontation with Amara, but Castiel resolves to remain Lucifer's Vessel until her defeat, only for the Hand of God to fail against Amara's power. With Castiel/Lucifer now Amara's prisoner, she decides to torture an archangel to try to lure God out, leaving the Winchesters to speculate that Lucifer could not use the Hand of God due to the fact that he is a fallen archangel. Lucifer is eventually rescued when God returns – revealed to be Chuck, the author who wrote the Winchester Gospels – with God/Chuck healing Lucifer and apologizing for his past actions. Although Lucifer is apparently killed in the later confrontation with Amara, Castiel is healed and returned to control of his body; he also meets his creator for the first time. After Dean's apparent sacrifice to stop the Darkness, Castiel goes with Sam although he is then banished when a member of the London branch of the Men of Letters attacks the bunker to punish Sam for his past actions.

=== Quest for Lucifer ===
Castiel is able to collect himself in time to return to the bunker and help Dean and the resurrected Mary Winchester find and rescue Sam. However, upon learning that Lucifer has escaped destruction, now jumping through vessels that rapidly burn out due to his weakened state making it harder for him to maintain them, Castiel sets out to find Lucifer. He is accompanied by Crowley and Rowena (resurrected by a one-time-use spell), although their first attempt simply sees Rowena banish Lucifer to the bottom of the ocean without killing him. Lucifer eventually takes the President of the United States as his vessel and conceives a child with one of the president's staff, but he is banished from this vessel thanks to the Winchesters and Crowley. After helping the Winchesters fake their deaths to escape the secret service, Castiel attempts to find Lucifer's child but is convinced to spare the unborn child by his mother, Kelly, who is certain that the baby will be good. When Lucifer returns – Crowley faked banishing Lucifer when in reality he attempted to trap Lucifer in his old vessel and control him – the Winchesters, with the help of Castiel and Crowley, confront Lucifer as Kelly is giving birth to Jack. The brothers are successful in luring Lucifer into the rift as Crowley sacrifices himself to close the rift, trapping Lucifer inside. As Castiel re-enters the portal, Lucifer kills him, while Mary forces Lucifer through the rift, trapping them both in the parallel dimension.

=== Reborn again ===
Although Castiel is dead, Jack, Lucifer's son, who regards Castiel as his guardian, is able to make Castiel "wake up" in the Empty, the place where angels and demons go when they die. The Cosmic Entity, who rules this realm, is annoyed by Castiel's being awake and attempts to use his own memories and insecurities against him to make him fall back asleep forever. However, Castiel believes that he is "already saved" and will not go to sleep, while demanding to be released. This defiance causes the Cosmic Entity to resurrect him and send him back to Earth, where he is overjoyed to be alive again. He later reunites with the Winchesters and meets Jack. However, he is subsequently captured along with Lucifer by Asmodeus when Lucifer returns to this world to warn them about the Michael of the parallel universe, who seeks to rule this world as well. Castiel and Lucifer work to escape together, but Lucifer attacks Castiel shortly afterward. Castiel stabs him, but Lucifer escapes. Castiel and the Winchesters work together to try to find Lucifer while also working with the prophet Donatello on a spell to free Mary and Jack from Apocalypse World. Donatello, without his soul that was taken by Amara, has no natural barrier against the corrupting influence of the tablets, causing him to become corrupted. He attempts to get Dean and Castiel killed when he tells them that they need to summon and kill ancient warriors Gog and Magog and retrieve their hearts as ingredients for the spell. Castiel, realizing there is no other way to safely know the true ingredients for the spell, forcibly extracts the spell from Donatello's mind, leaving him brain-dead and on life support. Sam and Dean are uncomfortable with Castiel's actions, but he tells them that there was no other way.

While the Winchesters search for other ingredients, Castiel searches for fruit of the Tree of Life in Syria. After finding the tree, Castiel fought and killed most of the Djnn clan that was guarding the tree and bargained with the survivors, possibly leaving Castiel married to their queen. Castiel then returns to the Bunker in Scoobynatural, where he is sucked into an episode of Scooby-Doo, Where Are You! following the Winchesters.

Castiel attempts to assist Sam in healing a traumatized Gabriel, who is actually alive, after faking his own death and being captured by Asmodeus, who tortured him and extracted his grace for power for years. Asmodeus then tracks Gabriel down and he and his demon underlings enter the Bunker, where they attack the group. Gabriel then regains his confidence and incinerates Asmodeus. Sam and Castiel tell Gabriel about the situation with Apocalypse World and ask for his help, but he refuses and leaves. Castiel then goes to Heaven to ask for help with Gabriel and the Apocalypse World Michael situation, where he is surprised to meet an alive Naomi. Naomi had actually survived Metatron's attack on her, and had spent the last years recovering. She then tells Castiel that due to the fact that there are only a dozen or so angels left alive after the various wars and purges of recent years, Heaven is at risk of falling apart and having the billions of souls residing there sent back to Earth as ghosts, which would cause untold destruction and chaos. She and the surviving angels must stay in Heaven in order to keep it running, although his news about an archangel, Gabriel, being alive gives them hope as his power could help keep Heaven running. Castiel, disturbed by the news and by Naomi being alive, leaves Heaven.

The Winchesters and Castiel, now working with Rowena and Gabriel, capture Lucifer to use his archangel grace for the spell after Gabriel's proves to be insufficient. Rowena then is able to open up a rift to Apocalypse World and Castiel then travels with Dean, Sam and Gabriel into the rift to find Mary and Jack. Castiel informs Gabriel of the situation in Heaven, but Gabriel is reluctant to believe that he can be of help after abandoning Heaven previously. Sam is killed by vampires while traveling to Mary and Jack's camp. The group then arrives at the camp and they inform Jack and Mary of Sam's death. Jack angrily asks Castiel and Gabriel why they did not resurrect Sam, but they inform him that neither of them are strong enough. Lucifer then enters the camp with a resurrected Sam, using him as proof of his good intention to simply try to get to know his son. Castiel distrusts this and handcuffs him, which Lucifer allows.

Arthur Ketch and the alternate universe version of Charlie Bradbury are captured by angels. The alternate universe version of Castiel, who never knew the Winchesters and thus never defected from Heaven is called in as an "expert" to interrogate and torture them. While he still uses the vessel of Jimmy Novak, this version of Castiel speaks with an accent, and has a pronounced facial tic and an eye injury. Meanwhile, the Winchesters, Jack and Castiel are informed of the capture of their allies and work to free them. The two versions of Castiel encounter each other. The alternate Castiel wonders about the other Castiel's allegiance to humans, and tell him that they are the same. Castiel agrees, and kills him. Castiel then works with Jack and the Winchesters to evacuate their alternate universe allies through the rift and back to their original universe. Gabriel is killed fighting Michael during the evacuation, and Lucifer is purposefully left behind by Sam. During the celebrations back at the Bunker, the Winchesters inform Castiel that Gabriel died a noble death helping them all escape.

Michael arrives from Apocalypse World at the Bunker and attacks the Winchesters and Castiel. Sam prays to Jack for help, who quickly arrives at the Bunker with Lucifer and defeats Michael. Jack, after finding out Lucifer murdered Maggie, rejects him, which causes Lucifer to admit he only needs his power, causing him to steal Jack's grace and disappear with him and Sam. Castiel and Dean tell Michael of the situation, who is willing to help them defeat Lucifer but cannot fight him due to the damage to his vessel. Over the protests of Castiel, Dean tells Michael that he is his true vessel and that he will be his vessel and they can defeat Lucifer together if Dean remains in control. Dean then fights and kills Lucifer, but Michael betrays the deal and takes control. Mary and Bobby return to the Bunker to find Castiel, alone and despondent.

=== War against Michael ===
With Dean now trapped as Michael's vessel, Castiel assists Sam and Jack in campaigning against Michael's forces while also trying to assist Nick in coping with his time as Lucifer's vessel. Michael is eventually apparently expelled from Dean, but Jack later dies as a result of his angelic heritage being at war with his human nature now that his grace has been stripped. Castiel is able to make a deal with the entity from the Empty to restore Jack to life in exchange for himself, but the entity chooses not to collect right away. Michael later re-takes Dean as a vessel, but after Castiel and the others enter Dean's mind to alert him to the situation, Dean is able to trap Michael in his own subconscious while he makes plans to trap himself to stop Michael for good.

When the Winchesters unintentionally change history when a wish-granting pearl draws John Winchester of 2003 into the present, this creates a new timeline where Castiel is still a servant of Heaven alongside Zachariah. The Winchesters are able to kill Zachariah and banish Castiel, but eventually are forced to send John back to restore the original history.

Michael is eventually destroyed when Jack taps his remaining powers, but this results in damage to Jack's soul, with the Winchesters and Castiel becoming increasingly concerned about his future sanity. Castiel is later able to restore the prophet Donatello to life, the mental damage he had previously suffered due to his lost soul now limited so long as Donatello reminds himself to be good. Castiel continues to assist the Winchesters, such as trapping psychic Chip Harrington in his own mind when Chip's psychic powers force an entire town to remain stuck in the 1950s. Jack's moral corruption escalates to the point where he kills Mary on impulse; Castiel attempts to retrieve her soul, but decides to leave her in Heaven after he confirms that Mary has reunited with John in the afterlife. When the angel Durmah attempts to establish a more ruthless form of Heaven, Castiel kills her when she tries to use John and Mary's souls as a blackmail tool.

=== War against God ===
God eventually returns to offer the Winchesters help against Jack's corrupted state, but when the Winchesters realize that God is manipulating the situation to suit his own narrative aspirations, they reject his plans, prompting God to release all the spirits and monsters the Winchesters have previously defeated from Hell. The Winchesters are able to defeat the wave of monsters after Rowena sacrifices herself to take the spirits back to Hell, but with his powers weakening and Dean blaming Castiel for Mary's death, Castiel decides to move on, although an encounter with a djinn inspires Castiel to continue trying to help others.

Castiel subsequently returns to the brothers to help them defeat God by encouraging a resurrected Jack to become stronger. After the plan fails and they are chased by Billie, Castiel sacrifices himself, declaring "I love you" and allowing himself to be happy. This activates his deal with the Shadow, who drags him and Billie into the Empty.

In "Carry On", Bobby Singer revealed to Dean in heaven that Jack resurrected Castiel from the Empty in order to help reshape heaven.

== Characterization ==
Castiel typically displays very little emotion and always exhibits an extremely somber disposition. Although it has been suggested angels possibly do not possess the ability to truly feel emotion, Castiel frequently exhibits affection towards Dean. This attachment and growing ability to feel even causes him to be "demoted", as his superiors fear emotions are clouding his judgment. Throughout his appearances in the fourth season, he also seems to, at the very least, come close to expressing regret, hesitance, and anger several times, and has once quietly laughed at a joke Dean made in "It's the Great Pumpkin, Sam Winchester". Actor Misha Collins feels, through Dean, "[Castiel is] learning a little bit about humanity and re-learning something about [his] own humanity from that exposure. So...there's a humanizing of Castiel going on." Castiel begins having an internal struggle between what is right and what is wrong, and whether or not to obey orders from Heaven. Collins feels this is because interactions with Sam and Dean have made the angel "uncertain" and "more fragile". Collins believes Castiel envies Dean's decisiveness and desires to emulate him.

Having lost his connection to Heaven in the fifth season, Castiel's humanization seems to have quickened by the episode "Free to Be You and Me", as he appears extremely anxious while in a whorehouse, is visibly distraught when asking Dean for help, and refers to the Archangel Raphael as "my little bitch". Despite becoming very arrogant when he becomes the "new God", Castiel still shows his caring side and ultimately returns the souls to Purgatory and shows remorse for his actions, promising to Dean to find a way to redeem himself in Dean's eyes, showing that he cares about how Dean views him. After losing his memory, Castiel is more human than ever, but still displays some of his emotionless side. After his memory returns, he shows real regret when he cannot undo the damage he did to Sam and essentially sacrifices himself to save him out of remorse for his actions. After Castiel wakes up from his catatonic state, he is now depicted as insane with tendencies to ramble about random topics. However, parts of Castiel's original personality are still shown with him still being happy to help Sam and Dean out and still knowledgeable about various supernatural things, but not willing to actually fight anymore even when his life is threatened. Castiel describes himself as "bad luck" and does not believe he should be around the Winchesters as a result. After traveling to Purgatory, Castiel regained his sanity, but still carries a lot of guilt about his previous actions. He is also now less distant from Sam and Dean and more appreciative of human things such as television.

While Castiel and his peers, contrary to depictions of angels in popular culture, are not out helping people in need, Castiel still has a conscience and cares about the welfare of humanity—creatures whom he believes to be "works of art". Speaking of his character, actor Misha Collins stated, "I think that these angels are at least loosely derived from some Biblical angel stories, and those angels are [very tough]. They just destroy. I picked up Revelations, and they destroy, they destroy, they destroy. There's no mention of cherubs and harps or any of that."

== Development ==
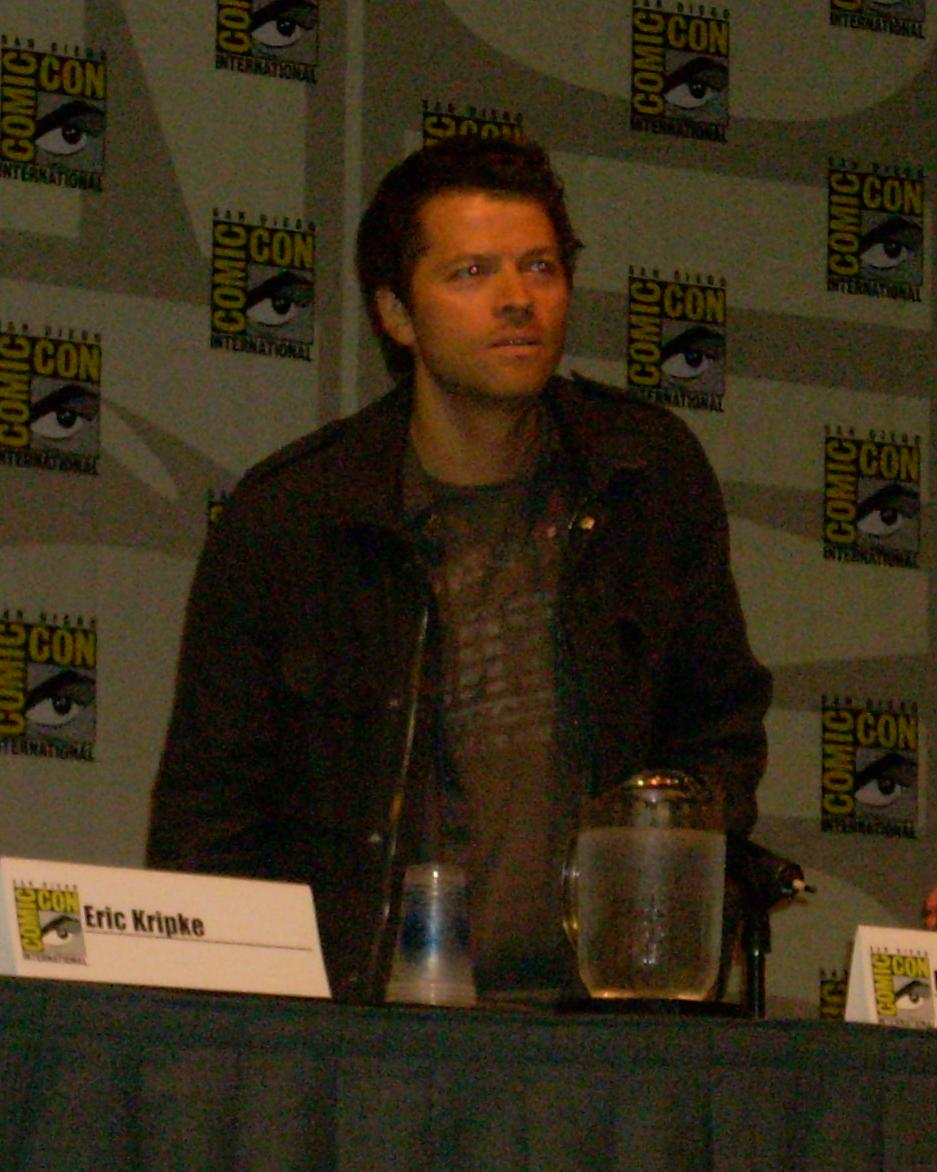
Collins at the 2009 Supernatural Comic Con International panel in San Diego

The character was created for the fourth season to introduce Christian mythology to the series. Because series creator Eric Kripke wanted to keep the introduction of angels a secret, the character was described as a demon during auditions. Kripke has said that he named the character after googling "Angel of Thursday", because the show aired on Thursdays. Once Collins got the part, the main direction Kripke gave him of the character was there is "an otherworldly quality to the character, and that he hasn't been up close with human beings. He's been watching human beings from a great distance for the last two thousand years, so angels haven't been on Earth mingling with human beings for the last two thousand years. So when [he is] interacting with human beings, there's a naive curiosity about their behavior. It's as if [he is] inspecting some sort of alien beings." The series director Kim Manners also encouraged Collins to play Castiel with an air of "piousness". Kripke based Castiel's appearance on the comic book character John Constantine.

To prepare for the role, Collins read the Book of Revelation. As well, Collins has said he somewhat based his character around his younger brother, who has something "angelic about him", as he "has this way of, very calmly, just staring into someone's eyes" making one feel "like he can get into your soul." To avoid the biblically toned dialogue from sounding too "campy", Collins does his best to "play it as real as possible". Because Castiel's true voice shattered windows in his premiere episode, Collins decided to use a "gruff, resonant voice" for the character. However, when portraying the angel's host Jimmy Novak, he tried to create a distinction between the two characters, providing different physical and personality traits, as well as using a "more boyish kind of sound" for Jimmy's voice.

Speaking of the fifth season and Castiel's more frequent interactions with humans, Collins commented, "Obviously the big joke is that he doesn't understand human beings and how they behave. And there is something inherently funny in that, especially if he's the straight man." The actor noted he was a little hesitant at making the character into "the funny guy", and was apprehensive about some moments in the early episodes of the season. However, he believes the writers have found "the line", allowing for the jokes to be "more subtle" and "a little more believable".

== Reception ==
Critical response to the character has been extremely favorable. Castiel ranked ninth on TV.com's top ten list of best new supporting characters of 2008. The staff and voters of TelevisionWithoutPity both agreed Castiel was the 2008–2009 Most Welcome New Character on television, and BuddyTV's John Kubicek listed him as one of the ten "TV Characters Who Deserve Their Own Spin-Offs". TV Squad ranked him as the top reason to watch the series, noting the "slightly awkward, frighteningly precise angel... has done an amazing job of selling the underlying menace and vengefulness of God's most heavenly creatures."

Karla Peterson of The San Diego Union-Tribune described the concept of Castiel as "genius" and the actor Collins as "fabulous". Deeming Castiel to be a "fascinating new element", Diana Steenbergen of IGN ranked Castiel fourth in her list of the "Ten Things We Love About Supernatural". She posited that Collins plays the role with "somber intensity", and "brings a sense of curiosity about humans to the character". The angel's interactions with Dean were "one of the highlights of the [fourth] season". She especially praised Collins for his dual role as Castiel and the angel's host Jimmy Novak in the episode "The Rapture", and wrote, "It is a tribute to Collins's acting that the audience knows immediately that the person we are seeing is not Castiel."

Fan response to the character has also been positive. Collins believed that the character would end up being just another role for him, and never expected such a reaction from the fans. According to him, "The enthusiasm that I've been met with is something new and not something I'm really prepared for." The character was originally intended for only a six-episode story arc, but his role was rewritten to continue throughout the rest of the season. Upon Supernatural's renewal for a fifth season, Collins was promoted to a series regular, something he believes to be mainly due to fan support.
