= Uriel (Supernatural) =

- Supernatural character
- First appearance: "It's the Great Pumpkin, Sam Winchester" (2008)
- Last appearance: "The Song Remains the Same" (2010)
- Based on: Uriel (namesake)
- Portrayed by: Robert Wisdom (season 4); Matt Ward (season 5)

In-universe information
- Species: Angel
- Gender: Male
- Abilities: Dream manipulation Human possession Teleportation; Telekinesis

Uriel is a fictional character primarily portrayed by Robert Wisdom on The CW Television Network's drama and horror television series Supernatural. An angel who utilizes force and destruction to fulfill his various orders from Heaven, he has a recurring role in the fourth season. Uriel's lack of regard for humanity often leads to tension with series protagonists Sam and Dean Winchester, and even with his fellow angels Anna Milton and Castiel. Though shocked at how his character differed from typical portrayals of angels in the media, Wisdom was impressed by the depth of Uriel's characterization and felt honored to have been chosen to play him. Critics praised Wisdom for his portrayal of the character.

== Plot ==
Uriel's (Matt Ward) first chronological appearance is in the fifth season episode "The Song Remains the Same", wherein he responds to the summons of a future version of his superior officer Anna Milton. After Anna lies to him by telling him that John and Mary Winchester—destined parents of series protagonists Sam and Dean Winchester—will kill him in the future, Uriel agrees to assist her in killing John and Mary to save his own life. However, the archangel Michael intervenes to protect the Winchesters and kills Anna before sending Uriel himself away.

In 2008, Castiel rescues Dean from Hell and tasks him with stopping demons from breaking the 66 mystical seals imprisoning Lucifer in Hell. Uriel (Robert Wisdom) debuts in the fourth season episode "It's the Great Pumpkin, Sam Winchester", in which Dean and Sam investigate a series of attacks by a witch. Uriel is sent to help Castiel by destroying the town to ensure the witch's death and prevent her from breaking one of the seals by summoning the demon Samhain, but is ultimately forced to abide by Castiel's decision to let them find the witch instead. The Winchesters ultimately fail in stopping the summoning and the breaking of the seal, though Sam manages to exorcise Samhain back to Hell using his demonic powers. At the end of the episode, Uriel threatens to kill Sam for utilizing these powers.

In "I Know What You Did Last Summer", the Winchesters and the demon Ruby attempt to protect the present-day version of Anna, who has fallen and been reborn as a human, from demons who plan to use her to find out the angels' secrets. Uriel and Castiel are ordered to kill Anna, partially to protect this information from falling into the demons' hands, but more importantly, because her actions in falling constitute a serious crime in angelic society that is punishable by death. Uriel and Castiel track her down at the end of "I Know What You Did Last Summer", but at the beginning of the following episode "Heaven and Hell", they are sent away with a spell Anna uses so that she, Sam, Dean, and Ruby can escape to safety. Uriel later contacts Dean in a dream and threatens to send him back to Hell if he does not surrender Anna. He also reveals that he has Anna's angelic grace, which is capable of restoring her to her true form, but refuses to give it back to her because he believes that she deserves to die for her "crime." When Uriel next threatens to kill Sam if Dean does not give up Anna, Dean feigns agreement, tricking Uriel and Castiel into a confrontation with demons also seeking Anna. While Uriel is preoccupied with killing demons, Anna steals back her grace and disappears in a flash of light. Uriel is about to retaliate against Dean for helping Anna regain her grace, but Castiel stops him.

Uriel's last chronological appearance is in "On the Head of a Pin". Now in charge of Castiel, whose burgeoning emotions have gotten him demoted, Uriel forces Dean to torture the demon Alastair for information about who has been killing angels. However, Uriel secretly frees Alastair. The demon attacks Dean, as Uriel had hoped, but Sam kills Alastair with his powers. A suspicious Castiel later questions Uriel, who eventually admits his involvement and explains that he has been working to convert other angels to his secret cause of serving Lucifer; the recently slain angels had been the ones who refused his offer, stating that "only an angel can kill another angel." When Castiel refuses to join Uriel's cause, the two fight but Uriel quickly gains the upper hand and beats on Castiel. However, Anna stabs him through the throat with his own angel blade, killing him.

== Characterization ==
"The end justifies the means in the angelic world, and humans are just specks on the planet. Smiting a whole town to take out an evil is an incidental thing to do. We can't get our heads around the magnitude of it, so we call it evil. It mirrors some of things we see like hurricanes, tsunamis, and natural disasters where we wonder, 'How can there be a God?'"
— Robert Wisdom on Uriel's outlook

Castiel's actor, Misha Collins, felt that Uriel lacks both a conscience and emotions, and "kinda seems to hate humanity in general". Unlike Castiel, whom Uriel's actor Robert Wisdom deemed "a man of reason" who is "very controlled in an entirely different way", Uriel "basically uses power to get the job done" and "[doesn't] suffer fools". On this aspect, Collins found Uriel to be "more of the Revelations angel" than Castiel because Uriel "doesn't have any problem with smiting and destroying" and "just wants to kill everybody". In the same vein, Supernatural creator Eric Kripke described the character as a "hitman for God". Although Collins referred to Uriel as "trigger-happy", Wisdom saw the character as simply "'eager' to carry out God's will". However, it is revealed in Wisdom's last episode as Uriel that the character has completely turned away from God, looking to the fallen angel Lucifer as his new leader because he empathizes with Lucifer's disgust for humans and feels that Lucifer's actions had been to defend angels, arguing that angels should not have to bow before humans as God ordered.

In Wisdom's opinion, Uriel views the Winchesters as "accidents waiting to happen". Because he thinks Sam cannot handle his demonic powers and is "going to screw everything up", he wants to "take him out while they can". Similarly, Uriel sees "no potential for being an ally" with Ruby despite her apparent loyalty to the Winchesters because he sees things in "black and white terms". On the other hand, he "gets Dean all too well and understands what he faced". Wisdom believes that the confrontation between Uriel and Dean in the latter's dream in "Heaven and Hell" causes a "[shift in] Uriel from brawn to understanding human nature". Wisdom described the pairing of Uriel and Castiel as "kind of a mix between characters from the Addams Family realm and The Odd Couple". Although Wisdom thought that the two "like each other" but "aren't real close", Collins believed that they do not get along and are "sort of forced to work together". He did note that teaming Uriel and Castiel together allows the audience to see Castiel's "softer side", as Uriel is "much more militant and more dogmatic" in comparison.

== Development ==
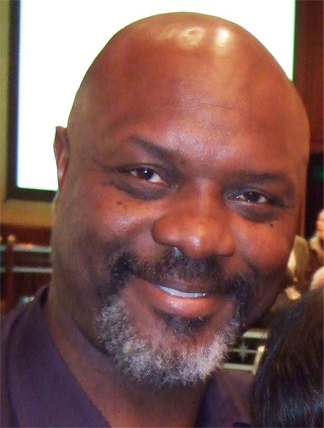
Wisdom was offered the role without an audition.

Helping to flesh out the angel mythology in the series' fourth season, Uriel is primarily portrayed by Wisdom. The actor received an offer for the role without an audition. He envisioned the angelic character as "someone with wings, dressed in white, and wearing a gown", and it "really kind of flipped [his] pages" that Uriel ended up a "heavy-duty guy who wants to smite everybody". Finding the character "totally fleshed out", Wisdom felt honored that he was approached for the part. The actor prepared for the role by reading the Book of Enoch and other angel lore. He found the materials "pretty scary", noting, "There's some pretty powerful, visionary stuff, and you see a lot of angels we really don't associate with angelic life." However, Wisdom would have liked to see the compassion that Uriel portrays in other angel lore, feeling that it "would add something interesting".

When introduced in the episode "It's the Great Pumpkin, Sam Winchester", Uriel is facing away from the Winchesters as he speaks to them. Noting that "No actor wants to have his back to [the main characters] during a scene", Wisdom chose to "just [have] trust" in the production's decision. This choice paid off, in Wisdom's opinion, because "with every passing line, Uriel's gravity just grew". The actor elaborated, "I thought that was theatrically very powerful, because from that moment of meeting the two boys, it's very clear what our relationship is going to be and what my mission is." Uriel does not demonstrate his angelic power until the episode "Heaven and Hell", in which he effortlessly kills two demons. Wisdom enjoyed the "challenge as an actor" of conveying a power "bigger than [himself]".

== Reception ==
Diana Steenbergen of IGN praised the "excellent" casting of Uriel, who is "immediately seen as powerful and ominous". Although Wisdom only briefly appeared in "I Know What You Did Last Summer", Steenbergen felt that he "did [his] usual job of commanding the screen during that time". Uriel's eventual betrayal made "perfect sense", with Steenbergen only being surprised because Wisdom "did such a good job portraying Uriel as the ultimate soldier". Tina Charles of TV Guide agreed that the show "nailed" Wisdom's casting. She felt he did a "great job" in his debut appearance, but was disappointed at his minor role in "I Know What You Did Last Summer". The character's loyalty to Lucifer, in her opinion, "wasn't a shocking revelation at all, but it was a good one". Likewise, Karla Peterson of The San Diego Union-Tribune loved the "bad-ass avenging angel" portrayed by "the mighty Robert Wisdom". Calling him "increasingly fabulous", she wrote, "Uriel is the bomb". Zack Handlen of The A.V. Club deemed the character's return in the fifth season "a clever touch".
