= Supernatural season 4 =

Supernatural
- Season 4
- DVD cover art
- Showrunner: Eric Kripke
- Starring: Jared Padalecki; Jensen Ackles
- No. of episodes: 22

Release
- Original network: The CW
- Original release: September 18, 2008 – May 14, 2009

Season chronology
- ← Previous; Season 3 Next → Season 5

The fourth season of Supernatural, an American dark fantasy television series created by Eric Kripke, premiered September 18, 2008, and concluded on May 14, 2009, on The CW.

This season focuses on brothers Sam (Jared Padalecki) and Dean Winchester (Jensen Ackles) encountering angels for the first time in their lives as hunters of the supernatural; this marks the introduction of eventual series regular, the angel Castiel (Misha Collins). The angels intervene to rescue Dean from Hell and bring him back to life after he became trapped there in the third season finale "No Rest for the Wicked". They explain that they have arrived on Earth for the first time in thousands of years in order to prevent the demons from freeing the fallen angel Lucifer from Hell, as Lucifer would then cause the Apocalypse. The demons are led by the Winchesters' enemy, and Dean's murderer, Lilith. However, it becomes increasingly clear that something is wrong with Heaven and that the angels have their own agendas. Despite an initially happy reunion, tension grows between Sam and Dean because Dean fears Sam's growing demonic powers and distrusts Sam's returning demonic ally Ruby (Genevieve Cortese).

== Cast ==
=== Starring ===
- Jared Padalecki as Sam Winchester
- Jensen Ackles as Dean Winchester

=== Guest stars ===
- Misha Collins as Castiel / Jimmy Novak
- Genevieve Cortese-Padalecki as Ruby
- Jim Beaver as Bobby Singer
- Julie McNiven as Anna Milton
- Robert Wisdom as Uriel
- Traci Dinwiddie as Pamela Barnes
- Kurt Fuller as Zachariah
- Mark Rolston, Andrew Wheeler, and Christopher Heyerdahl as Alastair
- Rob Benedict as Chuck Shurley / God
- Katherine Boecher and Sierra McCormick as Lilith
- Juliana Wimbles as Cindy McKellan
- Jake Abel as Adam Milligan
- Dedee Pfeiffer as Kate Milligan
- Nicki Aycox as Meg Masters
- Chris Gauthier as Ron Reznick
- A. J. Buckley as Ed Zeddmore
- Lindsey McKeon as Tessa
- Mitch Pileggi as Samuel Campbell
- Samantha Smith as Mary Winchester
  - Amy Gumenick portrays a younger Mary Winchester
- Charles Malik Whitfield as FBI Agent Victor Henriksen
- Travis Wester as Harry Spangler
- Sydney Imbeau as Claire Novak
- Matt Cohen as Young John Winchester
- Michael Eklund as Ed Brewer

== Episodes ==
In this table, the number in the first column refers to the episode's number within the entire series, whereas the number in the second column indicates the episode's number within that particular season. "U.S. viewers in millions" refers to how many Americans watched the episode live or on the day of broadcast.

No. overall	No. in season	Title	Directed by	Written by	Original release date	Prod. code	U.S. viewers (millions)
61	1	"Lazarus Rising"	Kim Manners	Eric Kripke	September 18, 2008	3T7501	3.96
Four months after his violent death, Dean Winchester is resurrected, and discovers remnants of a blast surrounding his grave site. Dean encounters a mysterious high-pitched noise while getting supplies at a gas station. After reuniting with Bobby Singer, Dean believes his brother Sam made a deal with a demon to bring him back. However, as the brothers reunite, Sam is just as surprised at Dean's resurrection as Dean is. Bobby then brings the Winchesters to a psychic named Pamela Barnes for help discovering what pulled Dean out of Hell. Pamela finds out the name of the being: Castiel, but the sight of Castiel burns her eyes completely, rendering her permanently blind. Having survived Lilith's wrath, Sam meets with Ruby about what saved Dean from Hell. It's revealed that since Dean's death, Sam has been using his psychic abilities to exorcise demons. Meanwhile, Dean and Bobby perform a ritual to summon Castiel, who turns out to be an angel, not a demon. He explains that he is responsible for dragging Dean out of Hell and tells Dean that God has work for him to do.
62	2	"Are You There, God? It's Me, Dean Winchester"	Phil Sgriccia	Story by : Sera Gamble & Lou Bollo; Teleplay by : Sera Gamble	September 25, 2008	3T7502	3.18
Bobby asks the boys for help when vengeful spirits tear apart his fellow hunters. Sam is haunted by FBI Agent Henrickson, whose spirit accuses Sam and Dean of failing him (Lilith tortured Henrickson and the survivors of the demon attack on the police station before their deaths). Meg Masters (Nicki Aycox), Ronald Reznick, and two twin girls also appear and haunt Dean, Sam, and Bobby. After the hunters retreat to Bobby's panic room, Bobby reveals they are being haunted by the spirits of the people they couldn't save, which is known as "The Rising of the Witnesses." This also indicates that the Apocalypse is nearing. The three find and perform a spell to put the Witnesses to rest. Later, Castiel appears to Dean in a dream and reveals that "The Rising of the Witnesses" is one of many seals which are being broken by Lilith to free the fallen angel Lucifer and bring about the Apocalypse.
63	3	"In the Beginning"	Steve Boyum	Jeremy Carver	October 2, 2008	3T7504	3.51
Sam sneaks out of the motel where he and Dean are staying to meet up with Ruby again. Castiel appears beside Dean's bed to transport Dean back in time to 1973 in Lawrence, Kansas with a warning to "stop it." Dean meets his parents' younger selves and his maternal grandparents, who are also hunters. Dean discovers Mary had made a desperate deal with Azazel, who fed Sam his blood the night their mother died. Dean fails to kill Azazel or save his family, and when Castiel returns him to his rightful time, he admits that there was no changing that. Castiel and the angels only wanted Dean to discover what Azazel was up to for himself. Castiel then sends Dean to find Sam, warning him to stop Sam from going down the dark path he is on, or Castiel will.
64	4	"Metamorphosis"	Kim Manners	Cathryn Humphris	October 9, 2008	3T7505	3.15
Dean confronts Sam about Sam's affair with Ruby. Sam argues that he can save people and exorcise demons simultaneously, but Dean reveals to Sam what he learned from Castiel. A hunter who has known the Winchesters for years calls on Sam and Dean for help in a case in Carthage, Missouri involving a man who is going through a metamorphosis into a Rugaru—a monstrous creature that consumes human flesh. During the hunt, further tension mounts between the brothers. Despite attempting to prevent it, the man completes his transformation. The man kills Sam and Dean's friend, but retains enough control to spare his wife. When the man tries to kill Dean, Sam is forced to kill him by burning him alive. Seeing what the man went through, Sam decides to stop using his powers.
65	5	"Monster Movie"	Robert Singer	Ben Edlund	October 16, 2008	3T7503	3.06
The Winchester brothers find themselves at a local Oktoberfest celebration in Canonsburg, Pennsylvania, investigating a series of suspicious murders being perpetrated by what locals describe as monsters from classic 1930s horror movies. They soon discover this is the work of a shapeshifter obsessed with monster movies. The shapeshifter has become infatuated with the local bartender Jamie, who it got close to in an alternate identity as a friend and co-worker. Jealous of Dean's budding romance with Jamie, it captures them both with plans to kill Dean and make Jamie its bride. Sam finds and frees Dean; while they battle the shapeshifter in the form of Count Dracula, Jamie kills it by shooting it with Sam's silver-loaded gun, which it deems a fitting end to its own "movie." The next day, Dean and Jamie part with a kiss, and the episode closes out on Sam guessing which movie Dean would like to live in.
66	6	"Yellow Fever"	Phil Sgriccia	Andrew Dabb & Daniel Loflin	October 23, 2008	3T7506	3.25
The boys head to Rock Ridge, Colorado, a town where a man died of a heart attack at 44 years of age with no symptoms. Research indicates the man died of "ghost sickness", which infects Dean. The illness causes first a general anxiety that builds into deadly fear. Sam contacts Bobby and learns the ghost they're after is called a Buruburu. Sam and Bobby decide to scare the ghost to death. They wrap an iron chain inscribed with a spell word around his neck, and Bobby road-hauls him behind the Impala, re-enacting his death. This successfully scares the ghost to death, saving Dean before his heart fails. The episode ends with Jensen Ackles lip-syncing Survivor's 1982 hit song, "Eye of the Tiger" while atop Baby (the Impala).
67	7	"It's the Great Pumpkin, Sam Winchester"	Charles Beeson	Julie Siege	October 30, 2008	3T7507	3.55
A few days before Halloween, Sam and Dean launch an investigation into two mysterious deaths in a small town. The brothers find hex bags and deduce that a witch is sacrificing people to summon a dangerous demon named Samhain. Castiel tells Sam and Dean that Samhain's freeing is one of the seals leading to Lucifer's freeing. Castiel brings a specialist angel named Uriel to smite the entire town to be sure of killing the witch, but Dean convinces him to give the Winchesters a chance. Despite their best efforts, Samhain is freed, and the seal is broken. Uriel warns Sam against using his demonic powers and says he will kill Sam as soon as Sam ceases to be useful to the angels. Castiel reveals to Dean that his true orders were always to follow Dean's orders to test his leadership under battlefield conditions. He confesses that he does not know the "right" choice and warns that hard times are ahead.
68	8	"Wishful Thinking"	Robert Singer	Story by : Ben Edlund & Lou Bollo; Teleplay by : Ben Edlund	November 6, 2008	3T7508	3.24
Sam and Dean investigate Concrete, Washington, a small town where the wishing well works. A teddy bear comes to life, a boy who is always bullied gets super strength, someone wins the lottery, and the town geek gets a hot girlfriend. The brothers realize that while everyone is happy now, the result will be disastrous because the magic will inevitably go wrong. The boys find that the origin is a magic coin that causes a fountain to become a wishing well because the coin's power is drawn from the goddess Tiamat. The only way to reverse the wishes is for the person who put the coin there to remove it. It turns out to be the geek, and he is reluctant to do so, but after one of the wishes results in Sam's death, he removes the coin and reverses all the wishes. Sam melts the coin down. At the same time, Dean helps the bullied kid keep up his new image of strength to prevent bullying in the future. With Sam having asked about what Uriel had meant by what Dean remembers of Hell, Dean finally admits to Sam that he does remember everything that happened in Hell, but refuses to tell him anything else, as Sam wouldn't be able to understand.
69	9	"I Know What You Did Last Summer"	Charles Beeson	Sera Gamble	November 13, 2008	3T7509	2.94
Ruby tells Sam and Dean a lead that other demons are searching for an escaped mental patient named Anna Milton, who had to be restrained after trying to warn people about the impending Apocalypse. After finding Anna's parents dead at her home, Sam and Dean track Anna to her father's church, where they are attacked by a demon named Alastair while Ruby escapes with Anna. Dean lashes out at Sam for trusting Ruby, so Sam tells him what happened while Dean was in Hell. Sam's account is depicted in flashbacks. After Sam finishes his story, Ruby finds the Winchesters and gives them Anna's location. Dean makes peace with Ruby due to his appreciation of how she helped Sam, and Sam is forced to break the news to a devastated Anna that her parents are dead. Castiel and Uriel demand to be taken to Anna so that they can kill her.
70	10	"Heaven and Hell"	J. Miller Tobin	Story by : Trevor Sands; Teleplay by : Eric Kripke	November 20, 2008	3T7510	3.34
Anna is revealed to be a fallen angel who became human by ripping out her "Grace," an intrinsic energy to angels. When the group attempts to retrieve Anna's Grace, they find it has already been taken. Anna receives an ultimatum from the angels that she is to be given to them, or Dean will be sent back to Hell. Ruby goes to Alastair with the proposition of handing Anna over if he will let her and the Winchesters go. He instead captures and tortures her with her knife for the others' location. Dean is forced to give their location away to Uriel, who has invaded his dreams and is revealed to be the one who took Anna's Grace. During the ensuing battle, Anna retrieves her Grace from Uriel. She becomes an angel again in a flash of light, and she and Alastair vanish. Castiel and Uriel leave in pursuit of Anna. It is revealed that Ruby and Dean betraying the others was all part of Sam's plan to get the angels and demons to fight it out to give them the opportunity they needed.
71	11	"Family Remains"	Phil Sgriccia	Jeremy Carver	January 15, 2009	3T7511	2.98
Sam and Dean investigate a murderous young female spirit inside the walls of a haunted house in Stratton, Nebraska. Complications ensue when a family of five moves in, and the "spirit" turns out to be two humans, a young pair of feral children who are the product of incestuous abuse and who are willing to kill to protect their home. When the son is kidnapped through the walls, the family looks to Sam and Dean to rescue the boy. Dean rescues the son, but is forced to shoot the feral brother dead in self-defense, while the father of the family is forced to stab the girl to death to protect his wife and daughter. Dean reflects on the children with pity, sympathizing with them on what they had become after a lifetime of abuse because of how he had tortured souls in Hell after being tortured to the breaking point.
72	12	"Criss Angel Is a Douche Bag"	Robert Singer	Julie Siege	January 22, 2009	3T7512	3.06
Sam and Dean attend a magician's convention in Sioux City, Iowa where it seems that real magic is being performed. Their investigation leads them to Charlie, Jay, and Vernon, three friends who were famous magicians in their day but have now been replaced by flashier, younger magicians. Jay's despair over this drives him to perform dangerous illusions onstage. Sam and Dean suspect that Jay is a witch and go after him, but the real witch is Charlie, who has faked his death and restored his youth. He offers to grant Jay and Vernon eternal youth and immortality. Jay refuses the offer and kills him for good, saving Sam and Dean. With Charlie dead and Vernon refusing to speak to him, Jay is left sad, bitter, and alone. Sam agrees to rejoin Ruby in hunting Lilith and practicing his powers.
73	13	"After School Special"	Adam Kane	Andrew Dabb & Daniel Loflin	January 29, 2009	3T7513	3.56
Sam and Dean discover that a spirit haunts one of their old high schools. While investigating the haunting, Dean and Sam relive their high school experiences through flashbacks, recalling how the school bully picked on Sam while Dean was quite popular. They learn that the ghost haunts the school bus and realize the bus driver is the father of Sam's old bully, "Dirk the Jerk." The brothers learn from Dirk's father that he died at age 18 before graduation and had a hard life. After finding that Dirk was cremated and that he is tied to a lock of hair kept on the bus, Sam and Dean confront Dirk while he possesses two people, and Dean burns his hair, destroying Dirk's spirit. Sam visits a teacher who gave him the advice to follow his path in life, but cannot respond when asked if he's happy.
74	14	"Sex and Violence"	Charles Beeson	Cathryn Humphris	February 5, 2009	3T7514	3.37
Sam and Dean take on a case in Bedford, Iowa involving a siren, a creature that desperately needs love, compelling people to kill others or themselves as a show of devotion. The siren has been posing as different strippers at a club to meet and seduce men, who then beat their wives to death at the siren's command. They suspect Dr. Cara, who Sam has slept with, after certain information is revealed by FBI agent Nick Munroe. While Dean and Munroe decide to follow Dr. Cara, Dean is poisoned by Munroe, revealed to be the true siren. Sam and Dean are both put under the siren's spell and are commanded to fight each other. They begin to argue over Sam's secret meetings and calls with Ruby, resulting in Dean attempting to kill Sam with a fire axe. Bobby appears and kills the siren breaking his hold over Sam and Dean. Bobby reassures them they hadn't been themselves under the siren's influence. However, the bitterness and tension between the brothers remain.
75	15	"Death Takes a Holiday"	Steve Boyum	Jeremy Carver	March 12, 2009	3T7515	2.84
Sam and Dean investigate the town of Greybull, Wyoming where people are miraculously surviving "fatal" injuries and illnesses. They discover that Alastair has kidnapped the town's reaper as part of a scheme to break one of the 66 seals by killing two reapers under the solstice moon, and they seek Pamela's help to stop him by using astral projection. She sends the brothers into the spirit world, where the reaper Tessa finds them. She has come to take over reaping duties, but gets spirited away by demons instead for them to use as the second reaper sacrifice. The brothers find the building where the demons are hiding, but are trapped by demons, who then go after Pamela and their inert bodies. Sam and Dean break the trap holding Tessa, Tessa repays the favor by freeing the brothers, and the three escape. The boys return to their physical bodies, but they are too late to save Pamela from being killed by the demons.
76	16	"On the Head of a Pin"	Mike Rohl	Ben Edlund	March 19, 2009	3T7516	3.37
In Cheyenne, Wyoming, someone has found a weapon that can kill angels and is responsible for several murders. Having captured Alastair, Castiel and Uriel demand that Dean use the torturing skills he learned in Hell to extract information from him so they can stop the murders. Sam calls upon Ruby to help him locate Dean. Sam begins drinking Ruby's blood to regain his diminished power. Alastair refuses to break under Dean's torture. An unseen force frees Alastair, who tries to kill Dean and exorcise Castiel. Sam arrives and tortures Alastair into admitting that no demon is behind the angel murders. Castiel realizes Uriel had killed the angels who refused to join him in releasing Lucifer, and had freed Alastair to kill Dean and keep the blame on the demons. When Castiel refuses to join him, Uriel tries to kill him, but is killed by Anna instead. Castiel visits Dean in the hospital and confirms that Dean broke the first seal with his actions in Hell.
77	17	"It's a Terrible Life"	James L. Conway	Sera Gamble	March 26, 2009	3T7517	3.13
Dean Smith is a sales director, and Sam Wesson is a tech support associate at a company. With no memory of who they are, Sam experiences dreams about fighting ghosts and vampires with Dean. They are brought together when Sam's co-workers start becoming obsessed with work, committing suicide, and Dean sees a ghost. Using advice from the Ghostfacers website, Sam and Dean learn how to defeat the ghost. Afterwards, Sam wants to take up a life of hunting, but Dean declines and rudely ends their partnership. The next day, Sam dramatically quits his job while Dean, after being offered a promotion by his boss, reconsiders and decides to quit. But his boss reveals himself to be the angel Zachariah (Kurt Fuller), who, after restoring Dean's memories, explains the whole thing was to show Dean that he is meant to be a hunter.
78	18	"The Monster at the End of This Book"	Mike Rohl	Story by : Julie Siege & Nancy Weiner; Teleplay by : Julie Siege	April 2, 2009	3T7518	3.27
Sam and Dean are shocked to discover a book entitled Supernatural that accurately details their lives. The author turns out to be a prophet named Chuck Shurley, who explains that he has visions of the brothers that he turns into cheesy novels. Castiel claims Chuck is a Prophet of God and informs Dean that an archangel would intervene to destroy the threat if Chuck were to be put in danger. Lilith finds Sam alone, but neither has the power to harm the other. Lilith offers to cease her attacks on the seals in exchange for Sam and Dean's lives. When Sam tries to stab her with Ruby's knife instead, the two attempt to kill each other just as Dean brings Chuck to Lilith. With Chuck now in danger, an archangel appears and chases Lilith off, saving both Chuck and Sam. At the end of the episode, Chuck has a horrible vision of the future, but Zachariah prevents him from telling Sam and Dean about it.
79	19	"Jump the Shark"	Phil Sgriccia	Andrew Dabb & Daniel Loflin	April 23, 2009	3T7519	2.70
In Windom, Minnesota, a 19-year-old boy named Adam calls Sam and Dean looking for their father, John, claiming to be his son. Dean and Sam suspect that Adam is a monster trying to lure them into a trap, but discover that John was the boy's father. Sam tries to teach Adam to hunt so that he may defend himself in the future. Dean goes alone to find the thing that killed Adam's mother and is trying to kill Adam. He gets trapped in a crypt, where he finds the real Adam's corpse; the Adam that is with Sam is a ghoul who killed and ate Adam to take on his form. The ghoul and his sister, in the form of Adam's mother, ambush Sam. They had wanted revenge on John for killing their parents years ago, but since they cannot kill him, they decide to kill his remaining sons instead. Dean returns to kill the ghouls and save Sam from being eaten alive. Afterward, they give Adam a hunter's funeral to honor the half-brother they never knew.
80	20	"The Rapture"	Charles Beeson	Jeremy Carver	April 30, 2009	3T7520	2.95
Castiel appears to Dean in a dream and says he has something important to tell him, but they need to meet somewhere private. Sam and Dean find Castiel’s human vessel at the meeting spot, Jimmy Novak, who cannot recall what Castiel wanted to tell Dean. They speculate that Castiel has been dragged back to Heaven. Demons try to capture Jimmy by possessing his wife and kidnapping his daughter. Sam, Dean, and Jimmy are captured trying to rescue them, and Jimmy is shot. Castiel possesses Jimmy's daughter, and he and Sam kill the demons. Sam drinks demon blood in front of a horrified Dean and Castiel so that he can exorcise Jimmy's wife. Jimmy has Castiel possess him again, but Castiel refuses to tell Dean what he wanted to talk to him about, having learned that he serves Heaven and not humanity. Dean and Bobby then lock Sam in Bobby's panic room to detox from the demon blood.
81	21	"When the Levee Breaks"	Robert Singer	Sera Gamble	May 7, 2009	3T7521	2.79
Sam experiences horrifying hallucinations as he detoxes from the demon blood. Bobby tells Dean they should let Sam out to help them fight the impending Apocalypse. Dean disagrees and goes to Castiel for help. Castiel secretly frees Sam from the panic room. When Anna confronts him on it, Castiel turns her over to other angels to be taken to Heaven for punishment. Sam feeds on Ruby, who says she has been working to uncover more information on Lilith. She reveals that few seals remain unbroken, and only Lilith can break the last seal. Dean finds the couple and tries to kill Ruby. When Sam defends her, Dean calls him a monster. The two brawl violently, ending with Sam leaving with Ruby after Dean tells him never to return.
82	22	"Lucifer Rising"	Eric Kripke	Eric Kripke	May 14, 2009	3T7522	2.89
Sam and Ruby capture one of Lilith's minions to question her on Lilith's whereabouts. Once they get the information, Ruby convinces Sam to drink the other demon's blood in addition to her own. Sam gives in after hearing a supernaturally altered voicemail from Dean in which "Dean" threatens to kill Sam the next time he sees him. Elsewhere, Zachariah explains to Dean that high-ranking angels like himself have secretly manipulated events to start the Apocalypse, believing it will cleanse the earth and bring Paradise. Dean's task is not to prevent the Apocalypse from starting, but to end it once it has. Dean is furious at Castiel for deceiving him. Castiel rebels against Heaven and banishes Zachariah with a blood sigil, letting Dean escape. Castiel tells Dean to stop Sam from killing Lilith since she is the final seal, her death will free Lucifer. Dean arrives at Sam's location in time to see Sam overpowering Lilith. Goaded by both Lilith and Ruby, Sam kills Lilith with his powers, unwittingly breaking the final seal. Ruby reveals she has been working for Lucifer, but Dean kills her with Sam's help. The brothers watch in terror as Lucifer emerges from his open cage.

== Production ==
The mythology was expanded even more in the fourth season with the introduction of angels. While Kripke originally did not want angels to be featured in the series, he changed his mind when he realized that he needed them in order to have a "cosmic battle" with the many demons. With this concept added into the series' mythology, the writers came to view the show as being "about two greasers and a muscle car, but the canvas that they're on are demons and angels and battles and the apocalypse..." While it was originally intended for the fourth season to feature an "all-out demon war", budget cuts forced the writers to change their plans, making it "smaller, more contained, underground, more guerrilla-style". Kripke feels this ended up benefiting the series, believing the brothers-centric episodes to be more interesting than the "epic" ones of the third season. Thus, the war was depicted in the writers' "scruffy, angsty, Supernatural way" while focusing more on the characters. The writing staff felt that the fourth season's mythology had been the best since the first season.

This is the last season with the involvement of executive producer Kim Manners in the production of the series. He directed two episodes in this season; including the premiere "Lazarus Rising". Manners died on January 25, 2009. The closing credits of the episode "Death Takes a Holiday", which aired on March 12, 2009, showed two photos of Manners, along with the caption "We dedicate the entire season to Kim Manners" and a message stating, "We miss you, Kim."

=== Casting ===
The role of the demon Ruby was recast during production of the season as Genevieve Cortese replaced Katie Cassidy in the role.

== Reception ==
The review aggregator website Rotten Tomatoes reported an 88% approval rating for Supernatural's fourth season, with an average rating of 8.7/10 based on 8 reviews. The season received critical acclaim and is widely regarded as one of the show's best seasons.
