= Alastair (Supernatural) =

- Supernatural character
- Mark Rolston as Alastair
- First appearance: "I Know What You Did Last Summer" (2008)
- Last appearance: "When the Levee Breaks" (2009)
- Created by: Eric Kripke; Sera Gamble
- Portrayed by: Mark Rolston; Andrew Wheeler; Christopher Heyerdahl

In-universe information
- Species: White-eyed Demon
- Gender: Male
- Title(s): Big-Timer; The Grand Inquisitor Downstairs; Picasso with a Razor
- Occupation: Hell's Demonic Chief of Staff; Hell's Master Torturer
- Abilities: Demonic possession Invulnerability; Superhuman strength Telekinesis; Teleportation; Occult knowledge

Alastair is a fictional character on The CW Television Network's drama and horror television series Supernatural, appearing in its fourth season. A particularly infamous demon and torturer in Hell, he is portrayed in succession by actors Mark Rolston, Andrew Wheeler, and Christopher Heyerdahl due to his demonic ability to possess human hosts.

The writers created the character to explore series protagonist Dean Winchester's experiences while in Hell, particularly Alastair's tutelage of Dean in torturing other souls. The character received generally favorable reviews from critics, with fans at the time considering him one of the series' best villains.

== Plot ==
When Dean Winchester is sent to Hell at the end of the third season, it is the demon Alastair who tortures him, stopping only when he eventually convinces Dean to torture other souls himself. Alastair begins training Dean as one of his apprentices until fourth season premiere "Lazarus Rising," in which Dean is rescued from Hell by the angel Castiel, who requires his assistance in stopping Lilith from breaking the mystical seals on Lucifer's prison. It is subsequently revealed that while the man Alastair was possessing did get vaporized, the demon himself survived.

Alastair (Mark Rolston) makes his debut in the episode "I Know What You Did Last Summer," in which he seeks to capture and interrogate Anna Milton, a fallen angel who can still hear the conversations of other angels. Dean and his brother Sam interfere, but Sam's demonic powers are too weak at the time to harm Alastair. When they try to kill him with Ruby's demon-killing knife, they accidentally stab him, with the demon laying claim to the knife as the brothers flee the area with Anna and Ruby. Alastair is later tricked by Ruby and the Winchesters into a confrontation with the angels Castiel and Uriel in the episode "Heaven and Hell" after torturing Ruby with her own knife for Anna's location. Alastair proves to be more powerful than the angels and quickly gains the upper-hand on Castiel, but is seemingly vaporized in the blast generated by Anna being restored to her angelic true form, the only thing left behind of Alastair being the demon-killing knife.

Alastair (Andrew Wheeler, with Christopher Heyerdahl soon taking over the role) returns in "Death Takes a Holiday," seeking to kill reapers to break another seal to Lucifer's cage. Though Alastair utilizes spell-work to prevent angels from actively interfering with his task, he is stopped by the Winchesters and captured by Castiel. Dean tortures him on Castiel and Uriel's orders in the following episode for information about a string of angel murders. However, the demon refuses to disclose any information concerning the murders, choosing instead to reveal that Dean's wicked actions in Hell broke the first seal. Alastair is eventually set free of his bonds when water damages the devils trap surrounding him and seizes the opportunity to attack Dean and Castiel, but is incapacitated and tortured by Sam, who forces him to admit that demons are not involved in the angel murders. When Alastair dares Sam to exorcise him, Sam uses his growing powers to kill the demon instead. It is later revealed that Uriel had freed Alastair; the one who has been killing angels, he had released Alastair in the hopes that the demon would kill Dean, and that demons would remain the suspects for the angel murders.

== Characterization ==
The original breakdown released to the media described Alastair as a "calm and composed demon with a placid smile that belies his simmering sadism and evil." Actor Christopher Heyerdahl deemed Alastair's lack of any goodness to be "what makes him so much fun", stating, "He just unabashedly loves creating havoc and pain and thinks it's the greatest thing." The breakdown also called him "one of the top demons in Hell" and "electrifyingly powerful". Nicholas Knight, author of multiple supplementary books for the series, classified Alastair as a demon chief of staff at the top of the hierarchy of Hell, and suggested that the character might even be the second-oldest demon ever created in existence in the show's mythos. Writer Sera Gamble supported this characterization by explaining that Alastair, unlike other demons who have no experience with angels, is "exceptionally old and powerful, so he knows a trick or two". Likewise, actor Mark Rolston called him the "John Gotti of demons".

Regarding Alastair's relationship with Dean, Rolston found the demon to be a "mentor" who "really took Dean under [his] wing". The actor explained that his character had wanted Dean to be "something great" and that when Dean had been rescued from Hell by angels, Alastair felt "kind of spurned or left out of the loop." Rolston felt that after Alastair gets retribution against Dean in "I Know What You Did Last Summer" for this "wrong", the character is "hoping [Dean] might come back into the fold" when they meet again in "Heaven and Hell". Although Alastair works with Lilith in breaking the 66 seals and trying to capture Anna for information on angels, Gamble felt that he would "rather be back in Hell, sticking bamboo shoots under fingernails", than starting the apocalypse. "He's not a politician. He's a torture artist," Gamble explained, "and he'd just as soon stick with what he loves. He's only topside because duty calls."

== Development ==
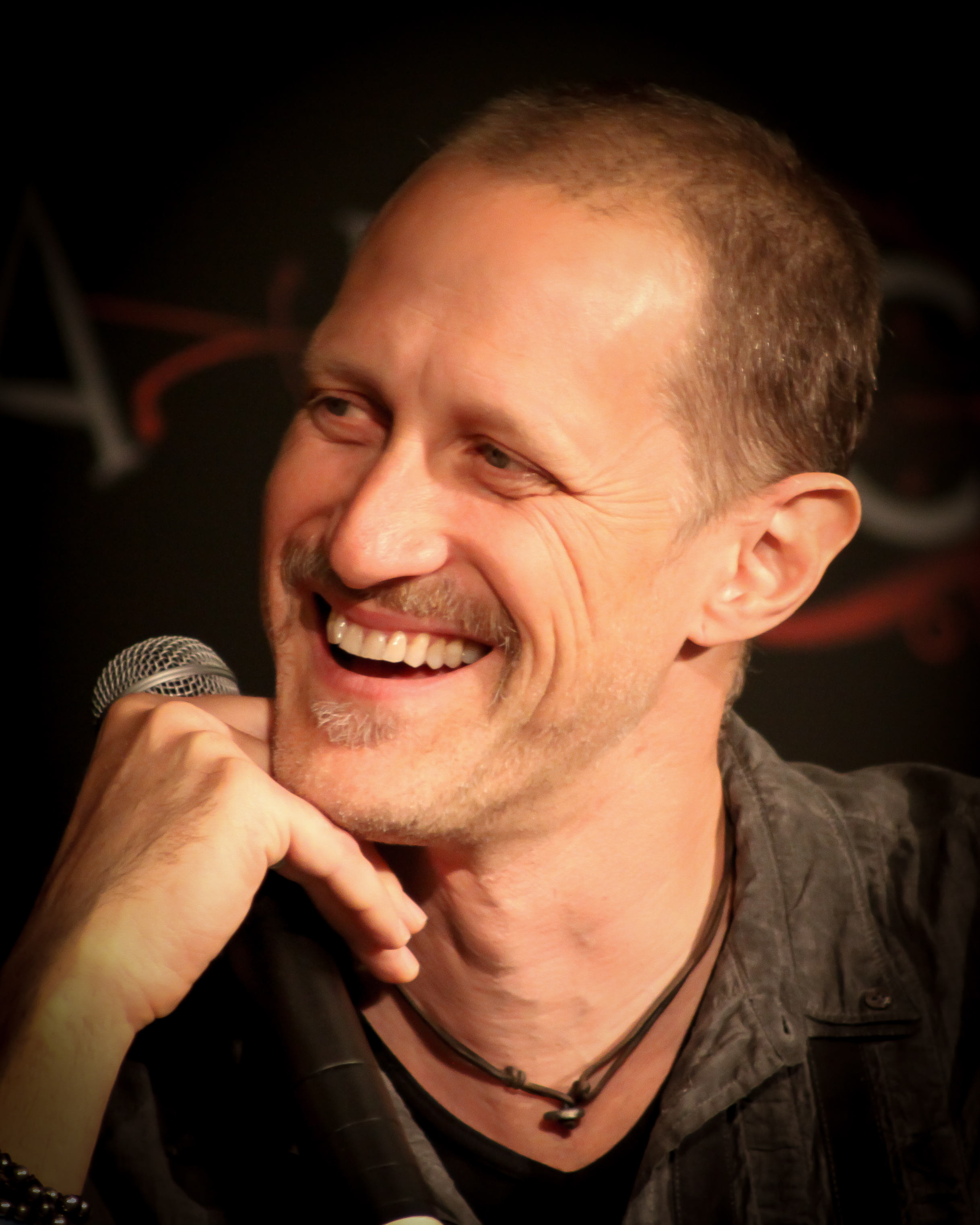
Christopher Heyerdahl portrayed the third incarnation of Alastair.

Rolston had previously auditioned for the series, and joked that "maybe they were just saving me for this particular role because [Alastair] was so wicked!" The idea that a "badass demon" could be possessing an ordinary man helped inspire the voice he developed the character around. Rolston described it as "particular, odd, and [sometimes] wicked, but at the same time, very believable." The actor also collaborated with the hairdresser to create a "weird style that looked normal and bookish." Director J. Miller Tobin gave Rolston free rein over the character in "Heaven and Hell", but did "[reel him] back on occasion." Overall, Rolston thoroughly enjoyed his time on the series, explaining, "Actors that play bad guys get to explore the other side of their personalities, things that you wouldn't normally have the opportunity or inclination to do." In particular, he loved the character's "big run of juicy dialogue," which was "quite a bit to sink your teeth into."

Noting that Alastair's relationship with Dean helps reveal the "pertinent details of Dean's Hell story," Gamble revealed that the writers planned for Alastair to reappear in the fourth season after his introduction in the episodes "I Know What You Did Last Summer" and "Heaven and Hell," stating that there is "more to come in a future episode" about Dean's time in Hell. Around that time, Heyerdahl saw Dean's actor Jensen Ackles' humorous performance of the song "Eye of the Tiger" that was originally shown in the end-credits of the episode "Yellow Fever"; upon viewing the clip, Heyerdahl thought working on Supernatural would be enjoyable because he thought "that guy [i.e. Ackles] looks like a lot of fun." Coincidentally, Heyerdahl was asked to audition for the role of Alastair just days later. Although he auditioned without having seen Rolston's episodes, his eventual viewing of those "fantastic" performances "made [him] even more excited" to portray the character. To honor the "music that [Rolston] brought," Heyerdahl developed what he describes as "a lovely three-way between what Mark had done, my own vision of the character, and the way director Steve Boyum played with the nuances." Unlike Rolston, Heyerdahl insisted that he roll his eyes for Alastair's transition to fully white eyes—the visual effects department usually adds this in during post-production—because he "just thought it was kind of fun."

== Reception ==
Rolston's performance mostly received praise from critics. In her review of "I Know What You Did Last Summer," Diana Steenbergen of IGN called Alastair a "formidable new foe" and was interested to find out more about the character. Likewise, Tina Charles of TV Guide saw the character as "a force to be reckoned with" from his first appearance, writing, "Here's to hoping Mark Rolston is around for a while." Rolston's "perfectly menacing" portrayal of the character continues in "Heaven and Hell," with Steenbergen making note of his performance as one that helped "save this episode from being more of a waste." She was intrigued by his invulnerability to Sam's and Castiel's powers and to Ruby's knife, as well as by Dean's connection to him. However, Karla Peterson of The San Diego Union-Tribune was negative towards Rolston's performance in the scene in "Heaven and Hell" in which his character tortures Genevieve Cortese's Ruby, with Peterson observing that he "appears to have been possessed by the ghost of Dinner Theater Marlon Brando," a similarity BuddyTV's John Kubicek also noted. More seriously, Peterson wrote in her review that Rolston was "so awful and amateurish, it's distracting."

Charles praised Heyerdahl as being "simply awesome" in the role of Alastair, and she "hated to see him go" in "On the Head of a Pin." Steenbergen agreed that Heyerdahl did "an excellent job carrying on what Rolston started"—she wrote that he was "just as menacing and might even be a little creepier" than his predecessor—but was ultimately happy to see the character get killed off because she found his voice "fine in short scenes, but too over the top the more time that was spent with him." As she had with Rolston, Peterson disliked Heyerdahl's voice as Alastair, calling his portrayal of the character a "bargain-basement Brando." Although she had viewed the decisions made to effect a Brando-esque voice for Alastair as "merely irritating in previous episodes," she believed that Heyerdahl's performance was "damaging" in the torture scenes of "On the Head of a Pin" as they were "campy to the point of being laughable," which "seriously undercut their dramatic power." She believed that the scenes were only salvaged by Ackles' acting ability. In contrast, Kubicek praised Heyerdahl's casting, describing him as someone who "would give Hannibal Lecter the willies." Nor did he feel that the voice Heyerdahl used for the character detracted from the character's effectiveness. Several episodes after the character's death, Heyerdahl reprised his role as Alastair in "When the Levee Breaks," portraying a hallucination of the character. Kubicek enjoyed the return, describing Alastair as being "just as creepy and funny as always."

Fans have shown Alastair positive reception. The character was voted "Best Villain" by readers of The Official Supernatural Magazine in an online poll, as well as "Best Demon/Monster/Ghost" in its Readers' Awards. In a poll conducted by BuddyTV in 2009, the character was voted the series' second-greatest villain, losing out only to Azazel.
