= Robert Wisdom =

American actor (born 1953)

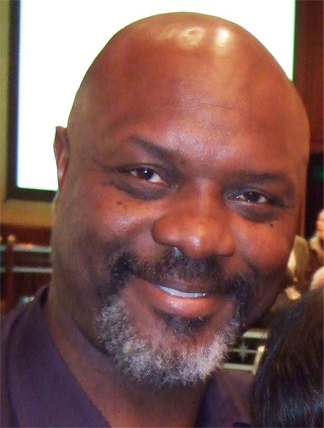
- Wisdom in 2008
- Born: Robert Ray Wisdom; September 14, 1953 (age 73); Washington, D.C., U.S.
- Education: Columbia University (BA)
- Occupation: Actor
- Years active: 1981–present

Robert Ray Wisdom (born September 14, 1953) is an American actor. He is known for his roles as Howard "Bunny" Colvin in The Wire (2003–2008), Norman "Lechero" St. John in Prison Break (2007–2008), Uriel in Supernatural (2008–2009), and as Jim Moss in Barry (2018–2023). He has been honored with an NAACP Image Award.

== Early life ==
Wisdom was born on September 14, 1953 in Washington, D.C. to immigrant Jamaican parents. He is a graduate of St. Albans School and Columbia University, where he was a star sprinter on the university's track team. He had turned down athletic scholarships in track and field to attend Columbia, becoming interested in acting as a senior after taking acting classes as a hobby.

== Career ==
Wisdom's first major acting roles were at the Bush Theatre in London, later acting throughout England and Scotland. He appeared in four of the five seasons (primarily seasons three and four) of the HBO program The Wire as Howard "Bunny" Colvin. Wisdom had initially auditioned for the role of Stringer Bell. He has also starred in the 2004 films Barbershop 2: Back in Business and Ray, and the 2007 film Freedom Writers. He landed a regular role on season 3 of Prison Break playing the role of a Panamanian drug kingpin named Lechero. He also had recurring roles in the television series Supernatural, Happy Town, and Burn Notice. Wisdom was once a producer for NPR's All Things Considered.

From 2012 to 2013, Wisdom was a series regular in season one of the ABC drama series Nashville, as Coleman Carlisle.

From 2022 to 2023, Wisdom starred in the HBO black-comedy series Barry, as Jim Moss, for which he was nominated for the Screen Actors Guild Award for Outstanding Performance by an Ensemble in a Comedy Series.

== Filmography ==
=== Film ===
Year	Title	Role	Notes
1994	Clean Slate	Mort	
1996	Hellraiser: Bloodline	Gambler Cenobite	
1996	That Thing You Do!	Bobby Washington	
1996	Invader	Colonel Jessie Pratt	
1996	No Easy Way	Motel Manager	
1997	Volcano	O.E.M. Staffer #2	
1997	Face/Off	Tito Biondi	
1997	Stir	Detective Williams	
1997	Jamaica Beat	Inspector Sterling	
1998	Three Businessmen	Leroy Jasper	
1998	Mighty Joe Young	Kwell	
1999	How to Get Laid at the End of the World	Quonset Jones	
2000	The Heist	Slim	Made-for-video
2000	Dancing at the Blue Iguana	Eddie	
2001	Rocky Road	Michael Jones	
2001	Storytelling	Mr. Scott	
2001	Osmosis Jones	Big Germ	Voice
2001	Hollywood Palms	The Dutchman	
2001	D.C. Smalls	Miles	Short subject
2002	Coastlines	Bob Johnson	
2003	Masked and Anonymous	Lucius	
2003	Duplex	Officer Dan	
2004	Barbershop 2: Back in Business	Alderman Lalowe Brown	
2004	Killer Diller	Moker	
2004	Haven	Mr. Sterling	
2004	Ray	Jack Lauderdale	
2004	The Forgotten	Carl Dayton	
2004	Crazy like a Fox	Roy Fowler	
2005	Mozart and the Whale	Blume	
2006	The Hawk Is Dying	Billy Bob	
2007	Freedom Writers	Dr. Carl Cohn	
2007	Sex and Death 101	Alpha	
2008	Ball Don't Lie	Officer Perkins	
2009	The Collector	Roy	
2010	Sympathy for Delicious	Prendell	
2010	Passion Play	Malcolm	
2011	Bright	Irwin	Short subject
2011	Rampart	Captain	
2012	The Dark Knight Rises	Army Captain Parker	
2012	Freelancers	Terrence Burke	
2014	The Loft	Detective Cohagan	
2016	Live Cargo	Roy	
2017	Unforgettable	Detective Pope	
2018	Beast of Burden	Mallory	
2018	Revival!	Jesus' Father Co-Worker	
2019	Motherless Brooklyn	Billy Rose	
2021	Vacation Friends	Harold Conway	
2021	A Journal for Jordan	Sgt. T.J. Canedy	
2024	Dreams in Nightmares	Virgil	

=== Television ===
Year	Title	Role	Notes
1990	The Bill	Johnny Olina-Olu	Episode: "Street Smart"
1993	Agatha Christie's Poirot	Waiter	Episode: "The Adventure of the Egyptian Tomb"
1995	Sahara	Sergeant Major Tambul	Television film
1996	The Sentinel	Lieutenant Williams	Episode: "The Debt"
1996	If These Walls Could Talk	Policeman	Television film
1997–1999	Poltergeist: The Legacy	Daniel Euwara	Recurring cast (season 2), guest (season 3-4)
1997–1999	Cracker	Detective Danny Watlington	Main cast
1998	Arli$$	-	Episode: "His Name Is Arliss Michaels"
1998	Dharma & Greg	Prospero	Episode: "It Takes a Village"
1999	Wasteland	Professor James	Episode: "Pilot"
2000	For Love or Country: The Arturo Sandoval Story	Oscar Valdez	Television film
2001	ER	Dr. Hammond	Episode: "Piece of Mind"
2001	The District	Mr. Broyles	Episode: "To Serve and Protect"
2002	NYPD Blue	Eric Green	Episode: "Safari, So Good"
2002	Live from Baghdad	Bernard Shaw	Television film
2003	The Agency	Mr. Banga	Episode: "Absolute Bastard"
2003	Kingpin	Rolando	2 episodes
2003	Boomtown	Daryl "Chronic" Norcott	Episode: "Execution"
2003	Judging Amy	D.A. Matthews	Episode: "Tricks of the Trade"
2003–2008	The Wire	Howard "Bunny" Colvin	Guest (season 2 & 5), main cast (season 3-4)
2004	Century City	-	Episode: "Only You"
2005	Inconceivable	Earl Godcheaux	Episode: "Balls in Your Court"
2007	Close to Home	Reverend Scofield	Episode: "Eminent Domain"
2007	The Nine	Clarence Jones	Episode: "Man of the Year"
2007–2008	Prison Break	Norman "Lechero" St. John	Main cast (season 3)
2008–2009	Supernatural	Uriel	Recurring cast (season 4)
2009	NCIS	Warden Gene Halsey	Episode: "Caged"
2009	Lie to Me	Bonds	Episode: "Pilot"
2009	How I Met Your Mother	McCracken	Episode: "Murtaugh"
2009	Law & Order: Special Victims Unit	Father Theo Burdett	Episode: "Hell"
2010	Happy Town	Roger Hobbs	Main cast
2010	Hawthorne	Calvin Jenkins	Episode: "Afterglow"
2010–2011	Burn Notice	Vaughn Anderson	Recurring cast (season 4), guest (season 5)
2011	Nikita	CIA Director Abbott	Episode: "Pandora"
2011	Prime Suspect	Chuck Reingold	Episode: "Shame"
2012	Comedy Bang! Bang!	Cop Actor	Episode: "Paul Rudd Wears a Red Lumberjack Flannel Shirt"
2012–2013	Nashville	Coleman Carlisle	Main cast (season 1), guest (season 2)
2013	Grey's Anatomy	Mr. Hamilton	Episode: "Sorry Seems to Be the Hardest Word"
2014	Legends	Conrad Tomlin	2 episodes
2014–2015	Chicago P.D.	Commander Ron Perry	Recurring cast (season 1-2)
2015	12 Monkeys	Jeremy	Episode: "Pilot"
2015–2019	Ballers	Dennis Jerret	Recurring cast
2016–2017	Rosewood	Gerald Kelly	Guest: season 1, recurring cast: season 2
2016–2017	Flaked	George Flack	Recurring cast
2017	Seven Bucks Digital Studios	Dennis Jerret	Episode: "Get Pumped Up for "Ballers" Season 3 with the Rock"
2018–2020	The Alienist	Cyrus Montrose	Main cast
2019	Blue Bloods	Inspector Andre Clifford	Episode: "Blues"
2019	The Fix	Buck Neal	Recurring cast
2019	The Hot Zone	Col. Vernon Tucker	Recurring cast (season 1)
2019	Watchmen	Seymour	Recurring cast
2020	Helstrom	Caretaker	Main cast
2021	The Big Leap	Earl Reyes	Recurring cast
2022	Black Bird	Edmund Beaumont	Recurring cast
2022–2023	Barry	Jim Moss	Recurring cast (season 3), main cast (season 4); Nominee Screen Actors Guild Award for Outstanding Performance by an Ensemble in a Comedy Series
2023	Accused	Mitch Becker	Episode: "Scott's Story"
2023	Star Trek: Strange New Worlds	Dak’Rah	Episode: "Under the Cloak of War"
2025	The Terminal List: Dark Wolf	Jed Haverford	Recurring role

=== Video games ===
Year	Title	Role	Notes
2008	Spider-Man: Web of Shadows	Luke Cage	
2009	The Lord of the Rings: Conquest	Uruk-Hai Officer #2	
2012	Call of Duty: Black Ops II	Jonas Savimbi	
2014	Call of Duty: Advanced Warfare	Prime Minister	
