= Dean Winchester =

Fictional character

- Supernatural / The Winchesters character
- First appearance: "Pilot"; Supernatural; September 13, 2005
- Last appearance: "Hey, That's No Way to Say Goodbye"; The Winchesters; March 7, 2023
- Created by: Eric Kripke
- Portrayed by: Jensen Ackles; Brock Kelly and Dylan Everett (teenager); Nicolai Lawton-Giustra (preteen); Ridge Canipe (child); Hunter Brochu (toddler); Chad Everett (elderly)
- Voiced by: Hiroki Tōchi (Anime, Japanese dub); Andrew Farrar (Anime, English dub)

In-universe information
- Nicknames: Jerk (by Sam); Squirrel (by Crowley); Deano (by Gabriel); Batman (by Himself)
- Species: Human; Vampire (cured); Knight of Hell (cured); Jefferson Starship (cured); Ghost (formerly)
- Gender: Male
- Occupation: Hunter
- Family: Sam Winchester (younger brother); Adam Milligan (younger paternal half-brother); John Winchester (father); Mary Winchester (née Campbell) (mother); Emma (daughter); Samuel Campbell (maternal grandfather); Deanna Campbell (maternal grandmother); Henry Winchester (paternal grandfather); Millie Winchester (paternal grandmother); Dean Winchester II (nephew)
- Significant others: Cassie Robinson; Lisa Braeden

Dean Winchester is one of the two protagonists from the American drama television series Supernatural, along with his younger brother Sam. He is portrayed primarily by Jensen Ackles. Other versions of the character having been portrayed by Hunter Brochu (toddler), Ridge Canipe (child), Nicolai Lawton-Giustra (pre-teen), Brock Kelly and Dylan Everett (teen), and Chad Everett (elderly).

== Development ==
Dean Winchester was created by Eric Kripke, creator and original showrunner of Supernatural, when he pitched a show to The WB about two brothers who investigate the supernatural. Dean's name is a homage to Dean Moriarty in Jack Kerouac's road-trip novel On the Road, tying into Kripke's concept for an Americana road-trip television series. It was intended for the brothers' last name to be "Harrison" as a nod to actor Harrison Ford, as Kripke wanted Dean to have the "devil-may-care swagger of Han Solo." However, there was a Sam Harrison living in Kansas, so the name had to be changed for legal reasons. Combining his interest in the Winchester Mystery House and his desire to give the series the feel of "a modern-day Western", Kripke settled on the surname of "Winchester". Dean and his brother Sam are from Lawrence, Kansas, due to its closeness to Stull Cemetery, a location famous for its urban legends. Jensen Ackles, who portrays Dean Winchester, auditioned for the role of Sam, but was then asked to read for Dean and found he preferred the character of Dean after reading the script.

== Character biography ==
=== Preseries ===
Dean Winchester was born on January 24, 1979, to John and Mary Winchester in Lawrence, Kansas. He is the couple's first child, four years older than his younger brother, Sam. He is named after his maternal grandmother, Deanna Campbell.

On November 2, 1983, Mary was killed in Sam's nursery by the demon Azazel, and in the ensuing fire Dean was tasked with carrying Sam out to safety while John unsuccessfully tried to rescue Mary. Since then, Dean has felt responsible for Sam and was always given the job to take care of him while they were growing up. John began investigating the cause of Mary's death and learned about supernatural creatures and the people who hunted them. John became a hunter himself, and trained Dean to be one as well, though both hid the supernatural from Sam until he was 8 years old. The Winchesters constantly moved around the country, living in motels and the homes of John's friends. Dean was left to look after Sam with John being continuously absent during their childhood. When Dean was 16, he was arrested for stealing and spent time in a boys' home where he had the opportunity to go to a regular school, though eventually Dean chose to return to Sam.

Prior to the pilot of the series, Sam left to pursue his own life away from the supernatural. John held a grudge against Sam as he felt Sam had abandoned them, while Sam also held a grudge due to the huge argument prior to Sam leaving. John and Dean continued to hunt together and traveled throughout the United States.

Dean is known for handling a large number of weapons. His signature looks are black boots, a dark leather jacket and dark flannel shirts with dark blue jeans. He is also known for driving a signature black 1967 Chevrolet Impala, which he occasionally sleeps in, and he has a huge stash of weaponry in the trunk.

=== Series ===
==== Season 1 ====
Dean is 26 years old when the series begins and has been allowed by John to hunt by himself. In the first episode, Dean goes to Sam (who is away at college), whom he has not seen for a few years, and asks for help finding John, who has gone missing. The pair are initially unsuccessful, and at the end of the first episode, Sam's girlfriend Jessica Moore dies the same way their mother did. Sam joins Dean on the road, hunting various supernatural creatures, tracking down their father and searching for the culprit behind the deaths of their mother and Jessica. After eventually reuniting with their father and coming into possession of the Colt, they prepare to strike back against Azazel, a powerful demon with yellow eyes.

==== Season 2 ====
Failing to kill him, they are rammed into by a semi-truck, sending Dean into a coma, whilst John and Sam receive minor injuries. Flat-lining, Dean is about to die but is saved from death at the last second when John makes a deal with the Demon to save his life.

After John's soul is taken by the Demon to Hell, Sam and Dean start hunting the Demon, who eventually kidnaps Sam. In a turn of events, Sam is stabbed in the back and killed, forcing Dean to make a deal to save his brother's life. He is given one year of life. Dean and Sam are unable to stop the Demon from opening a gate to Hell and freeing Lilith. However, their father escapes as well and gives them the chance they need to kill the Yellow Eyed Demon, before his soul heads to heaven.

==== Season 3 ====
While trying to cope with his impending death and make the best of his final year, Dean begins to start hunting the freed Demons. Meeting a seemingly helpful demon Ruby, Dean learns that he too may become a demon himself if he burns in Hell too long. Learning Lilith to have taken the throne of Hell from Azazel and to hold Dean's life contract in her hands, the brothers eventually confront her.

Unable to kill her, Dean is mauled to death by Hellhounds and his soul is dragged to Hell.

==== Season 4 ====
While there, Lilith orders a demon called Alastair to brutalize Dean. Dean spends four months dead, equating to 40 years in Hell. Dean had joined Alastair in torturing souls after previously refusing for 30 years. However, Dean awakens from his grave and reunites with family and meets the angel Castiel who (along with the army of angels who were also sent to work together) is revealed to have saved from Hell and resurrected Dean. Struggling with his actions in Hell and trying to get Sam to quit drinking demon blood, Dean meets Azazel again when sent back in time by Castiel.

At one point, Dean opened to Sam and revealed how he not only tortured but enjoyed the events while in Hell.

Dean encounters another angel, Zachariah who implores Dean to keep hunting after he nearly gave it up when learning Alastair had tortured John, who never broke in his time in Hell.

During Jump the Shark, Dean and Sam learn of their half-brother Adam with Sam. Although initially disbelieving, Dean is convinced of the relation with pictures. Dean is also against Sam using the teachings of their father on Adam after he is attacked by monsters. At the end, it is revealed that it was a ghoul (that wanted revenge on John for a previous hunt) who was impersonating Adam who was killed but Dean saved Sam and the brothers burned Adam's body.

Eventually, Dean learns that the angels want the Apocalypse to start and that if one of the Demon's Special Children, of whom Sam is the only one left, kill Lilith, Lucifer will be free. Castiel helps Dean escape the angels, as Dean kills Ruby (who was a spy for Lilith) but arrives moments too late to stop Lucifer from breaking free.

==== Season 5 ====
After Lucifer is freed, Dean and Sam are teleported onto an airplane by an unknown force (God). Later learning of his role as the vessel for the Archangel Michael and Sam's role as Lucifer's vessel, the brothers meet the King of Crossroads Crowley and fight against the Four Horsemen of the Apocalypse to defeat Lucifer.

On their search to find a way to defeat Lucifer, the brothers attempt to use the Colt and look for God, but it is revealed that the Colt cannot kill Lucifer and God does not care about the Apocalypse. These actions make Dean decide to become Michael's vessel even if the result is the deaths of millions of people, however, Sam's faith in Dean pulls him back into finding another solution. Upon the death of the Archangel Gabriel, the brothers discover that by using the rings from the Four Horsemen of the Apocalypse, they can reopen and trap Lucifer back into Hell. As Dean and Sam already have War and Famine's rings, they search for Pestilence and Death's location, leading Sam to meet his old college friend Brady: the guy who introduced Sam to Jessica and the demon ordered by Azazel to kill Jessica. Dean lets Sam kill Brady after getting the information they need.

Learning from Death how to trap Lucifer, Dean eventually lets Sam become the devil's vessel, but his strong bond with Dean helps him fall into Lucifer's Cage with Michael, who is using the boys' younger brother Adam as a vessel.

==== Season 6 ====
Quitting hunting and moving in with an ex-one-night-stand, Lisa, Dean begins to move into a normal life but is thrust back into hunting when attacked by a Djinn and mysteriously saved by Sam. Shocked to learn of his brother and maternal grandfather's resurrections, Dean is placed even more on edge when Sam acts cold, ruthlessly and lets Dean get temporarily turned into a vampire. This is mostly shocking because out of the brothers, Sam has always been the gentler of the two. Later learning from Castiel that Sam is lacking a soul, Dean sets out to fix his brother. Getting Sam's soul back, from Lucifer's cage, through Death, the brothers begin to unravel a conspiracy involving Crowley and Castiel. Defeating Eve, the mother of all monsters, Dean cuts ties with Lisa and learns that Castiel had taken Purgatory's souls to become the most powerful angel alive.

==== Season 7 ====
Requesting Death's help, Dean is unable to get Castiel to return the souls of Purgatory in time and the Leviathans break free and begin an effort to take over the Earth. After their father figure Bobby is killed by Dick Roman, the Leviathan leader, they gain an ally through Kevin Tran, a new prophet.

With the Word of God, Dean and Castiel kill Roman but are themselves killed in the subsequent explosion and dragged to Purgatory.

==== Season 8 ====
Surviving a full year in Purgatory with the aid of the vampire Benny after being abandoned by Castiel, Dean and Benny eventually escape. Dean is angered to learn that Sam did not even search for him. Reuniting with Kevin, they find another Word of God that details trials to close the gates of Hell. Dean aids Sam in completing the trials, and along the way they encounter the rogue angel Metatron and the Knight of Hell Abaddon. During this time the brothers are also given the Men of Letters bunker as a headquarters, by their paternal grandfather. Dean is horrified to learn Castiel was programmed by the angel Naomi to try to kill him. Capturing Crowley, Dean stops Sam from completing the trials when he learns it will kill his brother. When they begin to head to the hospital, Sam collapses just as the angels begin to fall down to Earth.

==== Season 9 ====
Praying for help, Dean learns Metatron fooled Castiel and stole his grace, leaving him human and causing the fall. Aided by an angel named Ezekiel, Dean allows him to possess Sam if it means saving his brother. With Ezekiel in Sam, however, Dean is unable to get any help from Castiel and begins to try to find a way to handle Abaddon. Joining up with Metatron, Ezekiel reveals himself to actually be the angel Gadreel and overpowers Dean, preventing him from saving Kevin. Turning to Crowley for help, Dean manages to purge Gadreel from Sam at the cost of their relationship.

Growing desperate to defeat Abaddon, Crowley manipulates Dean into accepting the Mark of Cain, from Dean's ancestor Cain, and aids him in locating the First Blade. Mending his bond with Sam, Dean kills Abaddon and nearly slaughters Gadreel. When finally confronting Metatron, Dean is fatally stabbed and once again dies. When his body is brought back to the bunker, Dean reawakens as a demon and leaves with Crowley.

==== Season 10 ====
Enjoying his time as a demon and killing several of Abaddon's loyalists, Dean eventually kills a man called Lester Morris and uses his newfound demon powers to confirm what Crowley told him about Sam. Eventually confronting his brother, Dean is pulled into a fight by a soldier named Cole, allowing Sam to use holy water to imprison his brother. Using the demon cure process to try to turn his brother back, Sam lets his guard down and Dean escapes. With the help of Castiel, however, Dean is cured, but still remains an enhanced human with the Mark of Cain. After eventually growing more and more powerful while losing control, Dean learns from Cain, before killing his ancestor, that there is no viable cure. Death later confirms this by revealing that removing the Mark would unleash the Darkness and offers to remove Dean from society on the condition that he kill Sam. Although he initially agrees, Dean relents and kills Death instead. However, due to Sam's earlier machinations, the Mark is removed and the Darkness is unleashed regardless.

==== Season 11 ====
With the Darkness unleashed, Dean and Sam set out to try to find the Darkness, but are shaken to learn that the entity they are hunting is essentially God's sister, who was 'sacrificed' so that he could create the world. Manifesting as a woman who comes to call herself Amara, Dean finds himself unable to kill her due to a twisted attraction, but matters become even more complicated when Castiel consents to act the vessel for Lucifer when he becomes convinced that only an archangel has any chance against Amara. This strategy fails – speculated to be due to Lucifer's status as a fallen archangel – but the Winchesters are eventually contacted by the true God, now revealed to be Chuck Surely, the author who wrote the Winchester Gospels, who is able to make peace with Amara and depart. Dean is shocked when he is reunited with his mother, who was brought back to life by Amara as a thanks for Dean's actions.

==== Season 12 ====
The Winchesters find themselves facing human and supernatural threats when the British branch of the Men of Letters attack the Winchesters to try to take control of America's hunters and Lucifer is left on the run trying to find a new vessel. Lucifer eventually takes the President of the United States as a vessel, but the Winchesters are able to banish him from this host.

While the Winchesters discover that Lucifer conceived a child while possessing the President, they are left to guard the child's mother while Mary explores the possibility of an alliance with the British Men of Letters. Although Castiel concludes that Lucifer's child is worth protecting, the potential alliance with the Men of Letters ends when the group prove to be excessively ruthless, to the point of killing a hunter who had assisted the Winchesters on a case because she accidentally killed one of their members.

==== Season 13 ====
The Winchesters are eventually able to banish Lucifer to a parallel universe where the Apocalypse took place 'on schedule', in 2012, but this plan backfired when Lucifer alerted the alternate version of Michael to the existence of the original world, as well as leaving them with the complication of trying to raise Lucifer's suddenly-adult son, Jack Kline (6 months old, chronologically). Jack soon comes to see the Winchesters and Castiel as his 'fathers', while they gain a new ally when they discover that Gabriel survived his death, in season 5, but although they are able to return to the Apocalypse World to rescue several humans (including alternate versions of Bobby Singer and Charlie Bradbury), the alternate Michael, and Lucifer follow them into this world.

Stuck for options to stop Lucifer after he takes Jack's grace to charge his own powers, Dean agrees to act as Michael's vessel, but Michael takes control of Dean's body after Lucifer's death.

==== Season 14 ====
Using Dean's body, Michael spends the next few weeks exploring this world until he decides to aid the monsters in taking control of the world as their desires are pure. Dean eventually manifested long enough to demand his freedom.

He briefly abandons Dean to continue his own plans while wearing down Dean's willingness to resist, but although Michael eventually takes Dean as his vessel again, with the aid of his family Dean is able to trap Michael in his subconscious. He is later informed by Billie the Reaper, who has replaced Death after his death, that Michael will inevitably escape his prison in every future but the one where Dean seals himself in an Enochian box at the bottom of the ocean, but although Dean starts creating such a box, he accepts Sam's argument that they will still try and find another way first.

Dean is briefly reunited with his father after a pearl with magical abilities grants him that which his heart desires. Although Dean hoped that his heart desire would be Michael out of his head, the family reunion was heart touching. John was forced to return to his own time before an alternate time line could ensue.

Still abandoning his plan to seal himself in the Malik box, Dean accompanies Sam, Castiel, and Jack in a fairly routine hunt. During this, Dean gets knocked unconscious only to wake, and find that Michael has escaped his mind. After slaughtering many hunters in his wake, Michael tortures the Winchesters but is confronted and killed by Jack Kline, who uses his soul to draw on his angelic abilities. In killing Michael, Jack not only burned off his soul, but also absorbed the grace of Michael, restoring him to his powerful state as a Nephilim. Due to this, Dean becomes increasingly more concerned with the condition of Jack's soul.

Parallel to this, the previous vessel of Lucifer engages in a plan to raise Lucifer from the empty. Jack is able to stop him in a grotesque killing which leaves Mary Winchester in a state of deep concern. Jack becomes frustrated and accidentally uses his powers to kill Mary. Dean finds out about his mother's death and starts into a fit of anger fueled by grief. On a mission to kill Jack, Chuck makes an appearance, supplying a gun which will do to the holder what it does to the victim. Dean accepts this as a solution for his building anger towards Jack and finds himself aiming, point blank, at Jack. Dean realizes that this is not the solution and drops the gun, eliciting an angered response from Chuck. Sam and Dean begin to realize that their lives have been nothing more than entertainment to Chuck, while he pulls the strings. Chuck kills Jack and releases every evil spirit from hell to attack the trio in a dramatic show of frustration, with a prequel statement "Story's over. Welcome to the end." Dean characteristically takes a fighting stance as the swarm engulfs him, his brother, and Castiel.

==== Season 15 ====
After Chuck brings on the end by breaking open the gates of hell, Sam, Dean and Castiel deal with the aftereffects, fighting off a horde of zombies and ghosts. After sealing the breach, they search for a way to defeat Chuck, finally succeeding after many tribulations. After defeating Chuck, Dean is killed by vampires during a hunt. He accepts his fate and tells Sam a tearful goodbye. He is then reunited with Bobby Singer in heaven who explains to him what has been going on since Chuck's defeat. Dean learns that Jack pulled Castiel from the Empty so that Castiel could help Jack reshape heaven for the better. Sam joins Dean in heaven after living a fulfilling life on Earth.

==== The Winchesters ====
Set in the 1970s, Dean Winchester narrates the story of how his parents, John Winchester and Mary Campbell, met, fell in love, and fought monsters together while in search for their missing fathers. Narrating these events, Dean Winchester reveals that, unbeknownst to the group, the Akrida are a threat to all of existence and he intends to continue searching for more information on this lost chapter of his parents' lives. Amongst Samuel's light-damaged reconnaissance photos, John spots a picture of the man who gave him Henry's letter. John and Mary don't recognize the man who is revealed to be Dean who is seen getting into the Impala in the picture. The Akrida decide to focus their efforts on using the Monster Club to find Dean who they know brought the hunters together to stop them. While under interrogation by the Akrida, John deduces that because the Akrida fear him, Dean is of not of this Earth and is the one person who can harm the creatures.

In a flashback, after John returns from Vietnam, he is given Henry's letter by Dean who is hunting the Akrida with Bobby Singer. In the present, Joan Hopkins, the Akrida Queen, reveals that she had thrown both Dean and the Impala into a portal which would tear them apart. Using the Ostium and Dean's hunter's journal, the Monster Club attempt to bring Dean back, but they only succeed in bringing back the Impala, causing the hunters to conclude that Dean must be dead. However, as Dean's car is also not of their Earth, Mary is able to kill Joan and by extension the Akrida by running Joan down with the Impala at the cost of driving through Joan's portal.

Dean rescues Mary from Joan's portal and reveals that the Monster Club is in an alternate universe. While driving through Heaven after his death, Dean had taken a detour through the multiverse looking for a world where his family got a happy ending, only to find the Akrida who were created by Chuck as a failsafe in case of his defeat. With the Akrida threatening Sam's safety as well, Dean defied Jack's orders about no interference to stop them. Jack reprimands Dean for his actions, but ultimately concedes and lets Dean finish what he started, returning Dean's journal and the Colt to him. Dean gives John his journal to guide his father in hunting in the same way that John's journal had guided Dean throughout his lifetime, and he gives Mary the Colt with a warning to use it should she ever encounter Azazel, who is due to force Mary into a deal the next year. When they ask his name, Dean hesitates before giving them a fake name, James Hetfield. He then vanishes with Jack and Bobby to return to Heaven, content that he had found a world where his family had a chance at a happy ending as Dean had wanted.

== Powers, skills and abilities ==
Dean is a skilled and highly resourceful hunter. He is well-versed in multiple types of firearms; he prefers his Colt 1911 and sawed-off shotgun, but is proficient with numerous weapons and firearms. He is also adept at brawling, and knife fighting, and has subdued several human assailants with ease and bested physically more powerful creatures such as shapeshifters, vampires and demons. He frequently utilizes improvised weapons and explosive devices; in "Croatoan", he demonstrated knowledge of chemistry, constructing Molotov cocktails and improvised explosive devices, and in "Phantom Traveler", he revealed knowledge of electronics and reverse engineering, having built an EMF detector from an old Walkman radio. Dean also possesses extensive knowledge of the supernatural, and mythology, and from season 4 onwards learns and is able to perform spells that are effective against angels.

Dean's work as a hunter requires him to impersonate various occupational roles in pursuing his investigations and avoid the attention of law-enforcement. To this end, Dean is well-versed in how police, and various other governmental agencies, such as the FBI and CDC, typically operate and conduct investigations. In supporting this lifestyle, Dean is also skillful in lock picking, breaking into security systems, carjacking and hustling for pool. Due to his time spent in Hell as Alistair's "student", Dean has an in-depth knowledge of torture. Dean is also an accomplished mechanic and maintained an intimate knowledge of automobiles and engines since childhood; he maintains his Impala in top condition.

When turned into a vampire, Dean had greater strength and all of his senses were enhanced. As a human, Dean was the bearer of the Mark of Cain; this granted him extraordinary strength, allowing him to fight on the level of a supercharged angel like Metatron. He also had several psionic abilities, the most notable of which is being able to summon and call the First Blade to him granted it is reasonable range. These powers also included premonitions given in dreams and immunity to both magical and demonic powers. As a demon bearing the Mark of Cain, Dean's strength was multiplied from the time he was a human, allowing him strength on par with, if not greater than, the Knights of Hell. His demonic powers also included a degree of telepathy, being able to read an individual named Lester's mind and learn his history with Sam upon meeting him. During his time as a demon, Dean also possessed the ability to easily regenerate from wounds and as his corrupted soul was possessing his own body, he was exempt from exorcisms that plagued other demons. During the short period as the angel Michael, Dean had powers similar to teleportation, telekinesis and rapid healing. Michael's possession also granted Dean the ability to wield the Archangel Blade to kill Lucifer, something that only an archangel could normally do.

In The Winchesters, Dean is unable to be physically harmed, at one point stating that a portal that was supposed to tear him apart couldn't hurt him because Dean was already dead. Taking on the form of a corporeal spirit, Dean was able to physically interact with the world around him without any trouble, but also appeared to possess the ghostly power of teleportation, disappearing from in front of John and reappearing on a nearby balcony, noted by John to have just mysteriously vanished after giving him Henry Winchester's letter. However, Dean preferred to use the Impala—which he brought with him from Heaven—for transportation.
