= Lilith (Supernatural) =

- Supernatural character
- First appearance: "Jus in Bello" (2008)
- Last appearance: "Our Father Who Aren't in Heaven" (2019)
- Based on: Lilith
- Portrayed by: Season 3: Rachel Pattee; Season 3 & 4: Sierra McCormick; Season 4: Katherine Boecher; Season 15: Anna Grace Barlow

In-universe information
- Species: White-eyed Demon
- Gender: Female
- Title(s): The First Demon Ever Created; Lucifer's First; Demons Messiah; The Last Seal
- Occupation: Hell's Demon Chief of Staff; Queen of Crossroads
- Family: Lucifer (creator/originator)
- Abilities: Demonic pacts Demonic possession Energy rays Invulnerability; Occult knowledge Superhuman strength Telekinesis; Teleportation

Lilith is a fictional character on The CW Television Network's drama and horror television series Supernatural. The series' writers conceptualized her as a dangerous new adversary for series protagonists Sam and Dean Winchester to face, introducing her to stabilize the story arc in the third season by giving demons a new leader in the wake of the death of the villainous Azazel and maintaining her as the primary antagonist until the conclusion of the fourth season. During the third season, Lilith tries to kill Sam and Dean, ordering for their deaths at the hands of her minions. Early in the fourth season, it was revealed that her goal was to free her maker, the fallen angel Lucifer, from his imprisonment in Hell. The protagonists' attempts to thwart her plan were the main plot of that season.

As a "destroyer of children and seducer of men", the character initially possessed little girls but was later depicted as possessing young women in an attempt by the writers to avoid showing violence towards children on-screen. The character received generally favorable reviews from critics, particularly for her role in "No Rest for the Wicked".

In season 15, Lilith is resurrected by God from The Empty only to be killed once again by the archangel Michael.

== Plot ==
=== Season 3 ===
According to series creator Eric Kripke, the archangel Lucifer "twisted and mutilated" the human Lilith's soul into the first demon "to prove a point to God...that human souls were...inferior to God and the angels". Having been freed from Hell in the second season finale "All Hell Breaks Loose: Part Two", Lilith (Rachel Pattee) debuts in the final moments of the third season episode "Jus in Bello" as the current leader of an army of demons also unleashed from Hell; the first half of the season had established that after the death of the army general and previous series antagonist Azazel created a power vacuum, leading to power struggles between demonic factions, which was resolved when Lilith ultimately emerged as the victor. In her "Jus in Bello" appearance, she searches a police station for the series protagonists Sam and Dean Winchester, brothers who hunt supernatural creatures. Having just missed them, she proceeds to torture everyone in the station for nearly an hour after destroying the station in a massive explosion. The Winchesters' demonic ally Ruby explains that Lilith sees Sam as a rival, as he has demonic abilities and was intended—but unwilling—to lead Azazel's demon army. Lilith orders Sam's death in order to secure her position as the army's general, even tricking the thief Bela Talbot into making a failed attempt on Sam's life with the promise of releasing Bela from her Faustian deal, only to go back on her word and let Bela get dragged into Hell.

External image
- Sierra McCormick (at IMDb)

With Dean having also sold his soul as part of a Faustian deal—one he made to save Sam's life—the brothers spend part of the season searching for the entity that holds the contract to Dean's soul and eventually learn from Bela that the demon in question was Lilith, who holds the contracts to all deals. In the third season finale "No Rest for the Wicked", the Winchesters track Lilith to New Harmony, Indiana, where she was holding a family hostage in the guise of their daughter (Sierra McCormick). Lilith secretly takes over Ruby's host body (Katie Cassidy) before Sam and Dean can attack her, to catch the brothers off-guard. She then commands a hellhound to kill Dean and bring his soul to Hell to be tortured by Hell's chief torturer Alastair as part of her plan to begin breaking the 66 mystical seals keeping Lucifer imprisoned in Hell. Lilith then tries to kill Sam by blasting him with destructive white energy, only to find that she is powerless against him. Horrified, she escapes before he can retaliate with Ruby's demon-killing knife.

=== Season 4 ===
External image
- Katherine Boecher in 2005 (at IMDb)

Throughout the fourth season, Lilith orchestrates the attacks by the forces of Hell on the 66 seals. She is opposed by angels, who resurrect Dean to assist them. Lilith eventually finds out that her death is the final seal that needs to be broken to free Lucifer. Reluctant to sacrifice herself, Lilith (Katherine Boecher) proposes a deal to Sam in "The Monster at the End of This Book": she will stop breaking the seals in exchange for his and Dean's lives. He rejects the deal and tries to kill her instead. She quickly overpowers him but is forced to flee before she can do anything more when Dean tricks an archangel into coming to the location. In the season finale "Lucifer Rising", Sam kills Lilith under the impression that her death will prevent the final seal from breaking, and in doing so inadvertently breaks the final seal, releasing Lucifer.

=== Season 15 ===
External image
- Anna Grace Barlow (at IMDb)

In the fifteenth season, Lilith was resurrected by God from the Empty, where demons and angels go after death. Possessing a young woman named Ashley Monroe, Lilith poses as the witness of a werewolf attack to get close to the Winchesters as part of God's plan, putting Dean to sleep and purposefully allowing herself to be captured by the monsters. Lilith's deception is revealed when she trips and is impaled on a set of deer antlers, and is unable to kill Sam and Dean due to it not being part of God's plan. Having sacrificed herself to release Lucifer and begin the Apocalypse, Lilith was shown to be bitter and vengeful over her sacrifice being in vain and claimed that Sam was only able to kill her because Lilith allowed him to do so. Lilith reveals that God intends for Sam and Dean to kill each other and destroys the Equalizer, the gun God created to kill the Nephilim Jack with and which Sam had used to wound him. Lilith then departs after promising to see Sam and Dean again. She later attempts to take the recently escaped Michael to God, but the archangel refuses. When Lilith continues to insist, Michael smites Lilith, who vanishes in a flash of white light, once again killing her.

== Characterization ==
"I see Lilith...and a lot of the characters who play our most powerful roles as a little cult of demonic true believers. Lilith really believes that the purpose of all of their work, the way the universe should be, is for Lucifer to be in control. Ultimately she's a true Satanist."
— Co-executive producer Ben Edlund

Series creator Eric Kripke noted that Lilith is "a combination of all myths concerning Lilith", and posited that the show would in particular explore her two main mythological roles of "destroyer of children and seducer of men". The former characteristic is demonstrated through her possession of children in her early appearances, which writer Sera Gamble considered "creepy and kind of molesty". Actress Katherine Boecher supposes that aspect to be "part of the mischievous side of her", feeling that "maybe there are a lot of demons out there that wouldn't go that far to take over a child". Kripke revealed that another legend about Lilith influencing their portrayal of the show's character was the traditional story of her origins, explaining that "she is generally esteemed as one of the first demons, certainly the first female demon, so we're kind of holding to that; we keep in our heads that that's really what she is, that she very well might have been Adam's first wife and was banished to become a demon."

Nicholas Knight, author of various Supernatural supplementary books, acknowledged that Lilith is evil but also revealed that she is capable of feeling love, stating that she "loves her creator (Lucifer) so completely that she willingly sacrifices herself, allowing Sam to kill her [to free Lucifer]". The show's writers set out to make Lilith's motivations "as logical as possible", with Kripke explaining that "everyone sets out thinking they're doing the right thing". He noted that in "Lucifer Rising", "There's a private moment with Lilith when she says to her minion, 'Don't be afraid... we're going to save the world,'" and he believes in her sincerity. Boecher, too, thinks that the character is "super-confident in what she's doing" and feels that "she really believes that she's going to fix things in her own way and that she has to take it into her own hands to do so".

Lilith is said to be "older and more powerful than Yellow Eyes (Azazel)" and thus holds higher status than Azazel, on which Kripke commented, "You don't get much higher than her until you start digging into Lucifer territory." Knight provided more information on the character's importance in Hell and in the story, explaining that she is a demonic chief of staff in Hell's hierarchy, ruler over witches, and "Queen of the Crossroads" for whom "all Crossroads Demons make deals, which is why she ultimately holds sway over Dean Winchester's soul." Knight also noted in-universe rumors that Lilith may be "Queen of Vampires" as well as the mother of Lucifer-fathered djinn.

== Origin ==
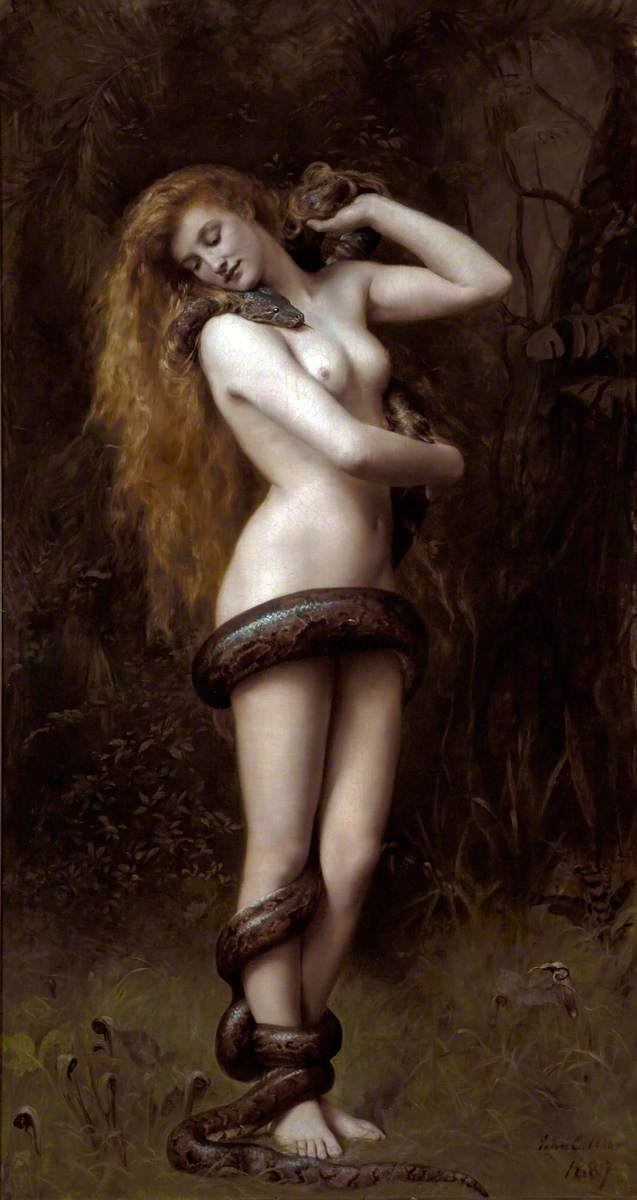
Lilith, by John Collier, 1887. The demon Lilith is based on the mythological being of the same name.

Lilith is described as a numinous figure whose perception has shifted over time. Lilith can be found in Hebrew, Christian, and Islamic literature with both positive and negative aspects, sometimes being portrayed as being transformed from a goddess into a demon, vampire, or djinn. In Hebrew tradition, she is considered Adam's first wife, who became a demon after refusing to submit to him. After refusing to comply and obey Adam, Lilith was expelled from the Garden of Eden. Some scholars interpret her refusal to submit as a rejection of patriarchal marriage, while others see it as an adaptation of older Sumerian and Babylonian goddess figures into Jewish mythology. Over time, Jewish tradition framed her as a dangerous entity, leading to the use of protective amulets against her influence.

== Development ==
The writing team for Supernatural's third season had "always" planned to introduce a new demon antagonist at some point in the season for that character to fulfill Azazel's role in the series as the lead villain. When Kripke felt that the season's initial format—that of the Winchesters fighting small, independent groups of demons, an attempt by the writers to reflect terrorist cells—was not successful, the writers chose to introduce this antagonist as the demons' new leader halfway through the season in order to stabilize the demon storyline. Although the character had the working title of Zarqawi during the planning stages, Gamble insisted that the demon be female. She eventually suggested the mythological Lilith, who the writers had previously learned was in part the basis for the Bloody Mary legend in conducting their research for the first season episode "Bloody Mary".

Writer Jeremy Carver said that the debate about what form Lilith would take quickly ended when the writers realized that a little girl "would be the most powerful representation of evil", which Kripke supported, saying, "I think it's just something about the innocence of a child saying truly awful, horror [sic] things." Much of Lilith's actions in "No Rest for the Wicked" served as a homage to the Twilight Zone episode "It's a Good Life", in which a powerful child terrorizes his town. Kripke enjoyed writing Lilith's scenes in the episode and found them to be among the easiest of the season finale to write, stating his view that she was "a really effective villain". Gamble, too, liked the way that Lilith was used that season; she found the decision to have the character be "a demon that likes to possess little girls" to be "interesting", and called Lilith "a cool demon to do". When Lilith temporarily takes over Ruby's host, executive producer Kim Manners was impressed by the performance that Ruby's actress Katie Cassidy gave, describing Cassidy's transition between the characters as "just astounding". Upon realizing that they could not depict Sam killing a child, the writers decided to have Lilith possess adult hosts in future appearances.

The writers initially intended for Sam to develop his demonic abilities in order to use them against Lilith in the third season. How the confrontation would have ended at that stage was uncertain, with Kripke stating that "when they (the Winchesters) went up against Lilith, maybe they would've survived and maybe they wouldn't have." However, the 2007–2008 Writers Guild of America strike prevented them from fleshing out Sam's abilities until the fourth season, and so Lilith and Sam's battle was pushed back. Lilith is "very active behind the scenes" for much of the fourth season, with the writers planning for her to make her on-screen return later on. Boecher received the part of Lilith for "The Monster at the End of This Book", with Kripke feeling that she fulfilled Lilith's myth of being a "seducer of men" by bringing "a sexuality and a menace to the role". Boecher still attempted to maintain some childlike quality for the character to "bring out more sides of Lilith". Although demons typically rotate through their hosts, production asked her to return for "Lucifer Rising". Kripke admitted the benefit of having a familiar face return for the finale, but furthermore said that the production team "really liked what [Boecher] did, and [...] thought she had such a fascinating look. She's beautiful, but there's something really menacing in her performance as well, and the camera just loves her." The opportunity to reprise the role both surprised and excited Boecher.

Lilith is the first demon in Supernatural to be depicted with all-white eyes. When creating the character, it was decided that her demonic eye color should set her apart from previous demons in the series in order to illustrate her power. Inspired by his viewing of the horror film I Walked with a Zombie the previous year, Kripke was excited by the opportunity Lilith presented to introduce white-eyed demons into the show's mythos because he had found a white-eyed creature shown in I Walked with a Zombie to be "really disturbing". Unlike actors portraying Azazel in previous seasons who had had to wear contact lenses, Boecher's eyes were colored white using visual effects.

== Reception ==
External image
- Rachel Pattee in 2005 (at IMDb)

BuddyTV's senior writer John Kubieck was shocked by Lilith's debut in "Jus in Bello", specifically by the revelation that she appears as a little girl. Tina Charles of TV Guide opined that the decision to portray Lilith as a child played to the show's strength of "creating kids that are freakin' scary", but was surprised by the departure from the normal demonic eye color in Lilith's white eyes, wondering at its implications for the character. Overall, she deemed Lilith's introduction one of the highlights of the episode. Despite the change in actresses between Rachel Pattee and Sierra McCormick from "Jus in Bello" to "No Rest for the Wicked", Charles felt that "the results were still as creepy". Sandrine Sahakians, Editor-in-Chief for TV Equals, agreed, writing that, "the scene where she comes out with her dress all full of blood...was one of the freakiest scenes ever." In her review of "The Monster at the End of the Book", Sahakians was very surprised by how frightened Lilith seemed to be of her fate, musing that the character was "not as invincible as we once thought". She also found it "interesting" that, while Lilith was immune to Sam's powers, Sam was immune to Lilith's. Regarding Lilith's depiction in "No Rest for the Wicked", Don Williams of BuddyTV deemed her "one extremely scary little girl". He wrote, "As sad as I was to see [Ruby] taken over by Lilith, it was yet another chilling demonstration of how powerful the new demon leader is. Watching the little girl snap her grandpa's neck just for kicks was creepy enough, but seeing her take over Ruby's body was truly frightening. It's one of the many disturbing moments in 'No Rest for the Wicked' that helps to make it so unforgettable", concluding that, "By the end of the episode, it's obvious that the Winchesters have never faced any demon as powerful as adorable little Lilith." Karla Peterson of the San Diego Union-Tribune also remarked on Lilith's possession of Ruby's host, when she noted that Katie Cassidy did a "terrific job of acting like a completely different character is inside her body". Likewise, Diana Steenbergen of IGN found it "nice to see Katie Cassidy have a chance to act so differently", and believed that "Lilith and her little girl mannerisms in Ruby's body were far more chilling, and interesting, than Ruby's tough chick persona ever has been". On McCormick's reprisal of her role as Lilith in "Yellow Fever", Steenbergen was similarly positive towards Lilith's characterization, writing that, "Lillith [sic] as a little girl in a cute pink dress being the embodiment of evil is still creepy." She felt that the revelation in "When the Levee Breaks" that Lilith eats babies detracted from an otherwise well-written episode, as she believed that Lilith's evil had already been so firmly established that adding in a scene implying the murder of infants was "pointless".

Brett Love of TV Squad gave a mixed review on how the character was used in "No Rest for the Wicked". He enjoyed Lilith's storyline and that she "served as the catalyst for some great Ruby bits" throughout the season, but felt that the shortened season did not allow the proper build up for her character. He also did not like the change in Lilith's host, explaining, "each [body jump] takes away a little bit from the character...Especially if the demon in question keeps jumping into cute little girls". Although McCormick impressed him, he posited that "when it comes to menacing and scary, she's no Fredric Lehne" (Azazel). Overall, he felt "a little disappointed".

Fans have responded positively to Lilith. In 2009, she was voted the third-greatest Supernatural villain in an online poll conducted by BuddyTV, placing her below fellow demons Azazel (the winner of the poll) and Alastair.
