= Support Supernatural =

Charity fundraisers

- Formation: 2008
- Type: Charity fundraiser
- Location: United States
- Official language: English
- Website: www.supportsupernatural.com

Support Supernatural is a fundraiser, the proceeds of which were raised for The Humane Society of the United States, People for the Ethical Treatment of Animals (PETA) and for various other charities.

== History ==
The fundraiser site supportsupernatural.com was founded in 2008 by Lindsay Warren and Heather Vitas when there was fear that Supernatural would be cancelled after the 2nd season concluded. The fundraiser campaign was first coined "Save Supernatural" but was later evolved into "Support Supernatural". The goal of the campaign was to promote Supernatural while also helping charities.

== Charity ==
The first fundraiser was set out to raise $500 each for The Humane Society of the United States and People for the Ethical Treatment of Animals in the name of Jared Padalecki and his dogs. This goal was met in September. The fundraiser raised $1200 for PETA.

The fundraiser continued over the years and in total raised over $110,000 for charity.

As the series concluded on November 19, 2020, the website has been transformed into a blog that covers supernatural spiritual beings Angels and Angel Numbers.
