= The Devil in the Details =

- Supernatural episode
- Episode no.: Season 11; Episode 10
- Directed by: Thomas J. Wright
- Written by: Andrew Dabb
- Cinematography by: Serge Ladouceur
- Editing by: Donald L. Koch
- Production code: 4X6260
- Original air date: January 20, 2016
- Running time: 42 minutes

Guest appearances
- Ruth Connell as Rowena; Emily Swallow as The Darkness; Colin Ford as Young Sam; Lisa Berry as Billie; Valerie Tian as Ambriel; Mark Pellegrino as Lucifer

Episode chronology
← Previous "O Brother Where Art Thou?"	Next → "Into the Mystic"
- Supernatural season 11

"The Devil in the Details" is the 10th episode and midseason premiere of the paranormal drama television series Supernatural's season 11, and the 228th overall. The episode was written by co-executive producer Andrew Dabb and directed by Thomas J. Wright. It was first broadcast on January 20, 2016 on The CW. In the episode, Lucifer shows Sam his memories in an attempt for him to say yes to be his vessel. The title is a reference to the phrase "The devil is in the detail", meaning a mystery or loop on a detail.

The episode received critical acclaim with critics praising the Castiel reveal.

== Plot ==
Rowena (Ruth Connell) had a dream where Lucifer (Mark Pellegrino) showed up with the promise of rewards if she brought him Sam (Jared Padalecki). In the present, Lucifer shows Sam a memory of his childhood to show his changes and how he and Dean always take the decision to save each other instead of the world.

Crowley (Mark A. Sheppard) accuses Rowena of betraying him but she defends herself by claiming Lucifer will give her rewards. Dean (Jensen Ackles) is called by Crowley to notify him that Sam is in the Cage. Castiel (Misha Collins) and Ambriel (Valerie Tian) inspect the explosion area to find Amara. Amara (Emily Swallow) consumes Ambriel's soul but spares Castiel's life, sending him to Hell.

Dean contacts Billie (Lisa Berry) to get him through Hell. He and Crowley then put Rowena in a witchcatcher so she can be Crowley's slave. Lucifer begins attacking Sam and when Dean and Castiel arrive, he transports them into the cage. They get into a fight while Rowena tries to invoke a spell. She manages to get them out of the cage before Lucifer kills them. Sam and Dean leave the Hell while Castiel stays behind. Sam tells Dean that Lucifer may have been right but Dean states that Lucifer and the Darkness in the same earth would be catastrophic.

Castiel goes with Crowley and Crowley discovers to his shock that Castiel is none other than Lucifer. It turns out Castiel accepted to be his vessel so he could stop the Darkness. Lucifer frees Rowena and then kills her so he can't go back to the cage. He then sits next to Crowley, telling him they need to talk.

== Reception ==
=== Viewers ===
The episode was watched by 1.83 million viewers with a 0.7/2 share among adults aged 18 to 49. This was a 4% decrease in viewership from the previous episode, which was watched by 1.90 million viewers from a 0.7/2 share in the 18-49 demographics. 0.7 percent of all households with televisions watched the episode, while 2 percent of all households watching television at that time watched it.

=== Critical reviews ===
Professional ratings
Review scores
Source	Rating
IGN	8.6
TV Fanatic	4.4/5
TV Overmind	4/5 stars

"The Devil in the Details" received critical acclaim from critics. Matt Fowler of IGN gave the episode a "great" 8.6 out of 10 and wrote in her verdict, "'The Devil in the Details' was scrumptious Supernatural. My one main gripe, however, isn't necessarily that Cas made a dumb move, but that the episode sort of ham-fistedly shoved him into it with those on-the-nose scenes right beforehand about how he 'wasn't special.' Still, overall it was a nice swerve. As was Rowena's curtain call."

Hunter Bishop of TV Overmind gave the episode a 4 star rating out of 5 and wrote, "Supernatural is having a resurgent season. This is the best run of episodes that it's had since Season 5, and it's not particularly close. The show has a sense of purpose, and drive. There isn't as much aimless wandering, or MacGuffin type things like The Mark. There is an underlying message here that is pointing us down a specific path. Since Dean came back from Purgatory, it's been the same beats with the Winchesters, with no real development in site. It was always about the brothers-over-all, and the co-dependency of the two. The issue was always punted, always kicked down the road, to be examined for another time. It was the most frustrating thing about Supernatural."

Samantha Highfill of EW stated: "Returning from hiatus, I was a little worried that Supernatural wouldn't be as strong as I said it was way back in 2015. But I'm happy to report that my worry was misplaced. Thanks largely in part to the return of Lucifer, this hour was highly reminiscent of the show's glory days in season 5, not to mention that it was filled with humor and the sort of last-minute twists we crave."

Sean McKenna from TV Fanatic, gave a 4.4 star rating out of 5, stating: "While it appeared as if Supernatural Season 11 Episode 10 simply concluded the cage match between Lucifer and Sam, quickly wrapping up that story as a side stop with a dead end, a shocking twist and a major death in the last moments of the hour revealed that Lucifer’s part to play has only just begun."

MaryAnn Sleasman of TV.com wrote, "'The Devil in the Details' had moments of brilliance, as well as moments of utter WTF — and not the good WTF like cannibal make-out sessions in 'My Bloody Valentine' but more like the entirety of 'Season Seven, Time for a Wedding.' I mean, smiting sickness? Really? Could the plot to get Castiel alone with Amara be any more contrived?"

Becky Lea of Den of Geek wrote, "The Devil In The Details manages to function as a deconstruction of the Supernatural formula whilst also adhering to it to a certain extent. Old dogs and old tricks are the order of the day. There's a desperate situation that can seemingly only be dealt with by one of the brothers trading their safety for that of the world. One of the sidekicks is in trouble and might be compromising the Winchesters without realising. Lucifer's 'This Is Your Life' for Sam tours through the various times that either Sam or Dean have sacrificed themselves to save the other, going as far as they possibly could for each other time and again."
