= The Bad Seed (Supernatural) =

- Supernatural episode
- Episode no.: Season 11; Episode 3
- Directed by: Jensen Ackles
- Written by: Brad Buckner; Eugenie Ross-Leming
- Cinematography by: Serge Ladouceur
- Editing by: Donald L. Koch
- Production code: 4X6251
- Original air date: October 21, 2015
- Running time: 42 minutes

Guest appearances
- Ruth Connell as Rowena; Emily Swallow as Amara/The Darkness; Gracyn Shinyei as Young Amara

Episode chronology
← Previous "Form and Void"	Next → "Baby"
- Supernatural season 11

"The Bad Seed" is the 3rd episode of the paranormal drama television series Supernatural's season 11, and the 221st overall. The episode was written by co-executive producers Brad Buckner & Eugenie Ross-Leming and directed by main cast member Jensen Ackles. It was first broadcast on October 21, 2015, on The CW. In the episode, Sam and Dean are looking for Rowena while Crowley begins to take care of Amara so he can use her for his purposes.

== Plot ==
Rowena (Ruth Connell) is gathering witches to join her new coven dubbed Mega Coven. She also discovers that Crowley (Mark A. Sheppard) is alive after the witches reveal a recent event. When they try to leave, Rowena kills them.

Castiel (Misha Collins) informs Sam (Jared Padalecki) and Dean (Jensen Ackles) about the Darkness. Sam then suggests they seek Metatron, as he was God's Scribe. Crowley is notified of Rowena and orders her death. He is also shown to be guarding Amara (Gracyn Shinyei) to teach her about the world. While in a restaurant, Rowena and two witches are attacked by Crowley's demons but Rowena evades her death attempt.

An angel and a demon reunite in a pub and begin talking about the situations in Heaven and Hell, comparing it to God and Lucifer. Sam and Dean locate Rowena's location after a witch calls a spell. However, she only has Nadya's Codex and not the Book of the Damned and Rowena reveals to Dean that she contracted Sam to kill Crowley. Castiel is gone as he is still under Rowena's spell.

Castiel goes after someone but Sam and Dean manage to stop him in time and force Rowena to undo the spell. However, she escapes. Meanwhile, Crowley realizes Amara is out of control as she ingests too many souls and is shocked to see she's now a teenager.

== Reception ==
=== Viewers ===
The episode was watched by 1.59 million viewers with a 0.6/2 share among adults aged 18 to 49. This was a 15% decrease in viewership from the previous episode, which was watched by 1.85 million viewers. This means that 0.6 percent of all households with televisions watched the episode, while 2 percent of all households watching television at that time watched it. Supernatural ranked as the second most watched program on The CW in the day, behind Arrow.

=== Critical reviews ===
Professional ratings
Review scores
Source	Rating
IGN	8.4
TV Fanatic	3.8/5
Den of Geek	4/5 stars

"The Bad Seed" received critical acclaim. Amy Ratcliffe of IGN gave the episode a "great" 8.4 out of 10 and wrote in her verdict, "The Darkness is growing up quickly which means she's going to be a real threat in no time at all. It's a relief to see the plot move forward at this rate. The mythology around the Darkness keeps building up too, and it was brilliant to see even the lower minions of heaven and hell be concerned about what's ahead. The only negative thing about this episode is that Castiel was restored to himself without suffering many consequences. He was in pain, yes, but there were opportunities to do more with the curse."

Hunter Bishop of TV Overmind, wrote, "Supernatural is more serialized than I've ever seen it. Like I said in my last review, this probably won't last, but I like it a lot. It is, in my memory, the strongest opening stretch of episodes that the series has ever had. I am really into what is going on, and I hope that stays true. One complaint: Supernatural can try too hard to keep the campiness going, and Crowley is suffering for a bit in his interactions with Amara. Less jokes about Crowley buying kids books would be good is all I'm saying."

Samantha Highfill of EW stated: "So far, this season has had a great balance of darkness — literally and figuratively — and comedy, and tonight's episode might've been its best showing. Without losing touch of the great evil that looms over everything and everyone, 'The Bad Seed' managed to find every possible moment to have a bit of fun. Plus, it saw the end of what I like to call Zombie Cas, and you have to be thankful for that."

Sean McKenna from TV Fanatic, gave a 3.8 star rating out of 5, stating: "This was a decent episode, with some solid directing from Jensen Ackles. And while things did feel like they moved along with respect to the Darkness and fixing Castiel, the hour felt more like a transition to get the core characters back together and ready for what's next."

MaryAnn Sleasman of TV.com wrote, "'The Bad Seed' was one of those oddball episodes where so many of its pieces worked well on their own, but when pieced together as a whole, left something wanting. It was a solid mythology-expanding episode, but after the sweeping attempts to buck the usual Winchester trend in Season 11's first two episodes, it felt like a return to form for Sam and Dean, and I can't go back to that. I just can't."

Bridget LaMonica of Den of Geek gave the episode a 4 star rating out of 5 and wrote, "We reach the end of the episode with a lot accomplished. Cas is cured, Dean now knows about Sam's bargain with Rowena, and there's the hint of a possible alliance between the little guys in Heaven and Hell. Unfortunately, there's also a lot of problems, with Rowena freed (again), Uncle Crowley scheming and everything with that terrifying child-teen-kidult Amara. Our boys are set on a short winding path filled with danger and darkness. They better get some flashlights."

Lisa Macklem of SpoilerTV wrote, "I thought this was an interesting episode. And I always appreciate the inclusion of a Louden Swain song – 'Big One.' Lots of thinky thoughts and good bro-moments in this episode. The episode did seem a bit disjointed, however, perhaps a function of trying to do too many different things. Regardless, I'm happy to see the Cas-spell problem dealt with quickly. As a final note, I apologize for the tardiness of this review due to a personal crisis."
