= Supernatural season 11 =

Supernatural
- Season 11
- DVD cover art
- Showrunner: Jeremy Carver
- Starring: Jared Padalecki; Jensen Ackles; Misha Collins; Mark A. Sheppard
- No. of episodes: 23

Release
- Original network: The CW
- Original release: October 7, 2015 – May 25, 2016

Season chronology
- ← Previous; Season 10 Next → Season 12

The eleventh season of Supernatural, an American dark fantasy television series created by Eric Kripke, premiered on The CW on October 7, 2015 and concluded on May 25, 2016. The season consisted of 23 episodes and aired on Wednesdays at 9:00 pm (ET). This is the fourth and final season with Jeremy Carver as showrunner. The season was released on DVD and Blu-ray in region 1 on September 6, 2016. The eleventh season had an average viewership of 1.78 million U.S. viewers. The season follows Sam and Dean who, after killing Death with his own scythe to get rid of the Mark of Cain, releases an all powerful creature called The Darkness, who threatens to destroy everything in existence.

== Cast ==
=== Starring ===
- Jared Padalecki as Sam Winchester
- Jensen Ackles as Dean Winchester
- Misha Collins as Castiel / Lucifer (Note: Only credited for their respective episode appearances.)
- Mark A. Sheppard as Crowley

=== Special guest star ===
- Jim Beaver as Bobby Singer

=== Special appearance by ===
- Samantha Smith as Mary Winchester

=== Guest stars ===
- Emily Swallow as Amara / The Darkness
  - Gracyn Shinyei as young Amara
  - Yasmeene Lily-Elle Ball as preteen Amara
  - Samantha Isler as teenage Amara
- Ruth Connell as Rowena MacLeod
- Rob Benedict as Chuck Shurley / God
- Lisa Berry as Billie
- Curtis Armstrong as Metatron
- Mark Pellegrino as Lucifer
- Osric Chau as Kevin Tran
- Laci J. Mailey as Deputy Jenna Nickerson
- Shoshannah Stern as Eileen Leahy
- Matt Cohen as Young John Winchester
- Nate Torrence as Sully
- Briana Buckmaster as Sheriff Donna Hanscum
- Kim Rhodes as Sheriff Jody Mills
- Kathryn Newton as Claire Novak
- Steven Williams as Rufus Turner
- Katherine Ramdeen as Alex Jones
- Dylan Everett as Young Dean Winchester
- Mike "The Miz" Mizanin as Shawn Harley
- Colin Ford as Young Sam Winchester
- Lee Majdoub as Hannah
- Elizabeth Blackmore as Lady Antonia "Toni" Bevell
- Brendan Taylor as Doug Stover
- Finn Wolfhard as Jordie Pinsky

== Episodes ==
No. overall	No. in season	Title	Directed by	Written by	Original release date	Prod. code	U.S. viewers (millions)
219	1	"Out of the Darkness, Into the Fire"	Robert Singer	Jeremy Carver	October 7, 2015	4X6252	1.94
In the aftermath in the season 10 finale, the Darkness being released, Sam and Dean meet a young sheriff's deputy named Jenna who claims people have been going rabid and killing each other. A man whose wife has died has a newborn baby with him but he is infected. He insists on giving the baby to Jenna and the Winchesters, naming her Amara before he dies. Dean is haunted by a vision of The Darkness telling him he set her free and they are now linked into always helping each other. Dean wants to kill the infected and escape with the baby but Sam wants to try and cure them. Sam acts as a diversion allowing Dean and Jenna to escape, though Sam gets infected. Castiel struggles to control himself from inflicting more violence due to Rowena's attack dog spell, and is captured by two angels when he begs for help. Crowley regroups after narrowly escaping Castiel's attempt on his life, hearing that The Darkness has set off ancient alarms in both Heaven and Hell. As Jenna is changing Amara's diaper, she sees the Mark of Cain on her left shoulder.
220	2	"Form and Void"	Phil Sgriccia	Andrew Dabb	October 14, 2015	4X6253	1.85
Dean takes Jenna to her grandmother's home and leaves to help Sam. However, Amara begins levitating her toy blocks and Jenna's religious grandmother calls an exorcist while Jenna calls Dean. Dean arrives to find the "exorcist" to be Crowley who explains that he senses an ancient darkness in the child. At the same time, Jenna visits Amara and then suddenly murders her grandmother. Investigating the noise, Dean finds the Mark of Cain on Amara and remembering it on the woman from his vision, realizes that Amara is the Darkness. Confronting Jenna, Crowley realizes that she is now soulless, Amara having consumed her soul. Dean and Jenna fight before Crowley kills her. Crowley reveals he intends to use Amara for his own purposes, but Dean incapacitates him only to find Amara, now grown into a young girl, gone. Crowley later approaches Amara with people for her to feed on. At the same time, two angels torture Castiel before Hannah saves him. When he asks about the location of the Winchesters, Castiel realizes it was a ruse to get information from him. The other two angels try to hack his mind, but Rowena's spell gives him the strength to break free and fight back. Castiel kills the other two angels, but not before they kill Hannah. An infected Sam works to find a cure to the Darkness' poisoning with little luck. He encounters a Reaper who informs him that he and Dean will be thrown into a void when they die; that he is "unclean in a biblical sense." As a result, Sam researches purifications from the Bible and finds a reference to holy oil. Using holy fire, Sam is able to cure himself and then save the remaining people in the town. Returning to the bunker, he and Dean find Castiel begging for help.
221	3	"The Bad Seed"	Jensen Ackles	Brad Buckner & Eugenie Ross-Leming	October 21, 2015	4X6251	1.59
Sam and Dean search for Rowena to cure Castiel as well as begin to try to find Metatron before the other angels do, for information on The Darkness. A demon tries to kill Rowena while she is attempting and failing to recruit witches for her Mega Coven, leading the Winchesters to her. Though they take the Codex from her, she has hidden The Book of the Damned. Castiel loses control as the attack dog spell takes over him and goes rogue. While searching for Castiel, Rowena reveals the deal Sam made with her to kill Crowley if she removed the Mark of Cain from Dean, though Dean understands. Dean saves a woman from Castiel and is attacked by the angel. Rowena restores Castiel to normal and escapes. A low level demon and angel commiserate at a bar that the leaders of Heaven and Hell don't appear to be doing anything about The Darkness. Meanwhile Crowley is raising Amara and even he is unnerved by her power. Amara doesn't seem interested in a world of pure evil but she feeds on enough demons to make herself a teenager and demands Crowley bring her more.
222	4	"Baby"	Thomas J. Wright	Robbie Thompson	October 28, 2015	4X6254	2.04
Seen entirely in and around the Impala: Sam and Dean head for a case where a sheriff's deputy was killed. Sam has a dream where someone or something appears to him as a younger John Winchester, telling him he and Dean have to stop The Darkness and: "God helps those who help themselves." Sam thinks this and his other vision from when he was infected mean God is helping them, though Dean is skeptical. Sam is attacked while trying to talk to the victim's wife while Dean is attacked by the replacement sheriff's deputy and finds out shooting it with silver and beheading it doesn't kill it. A call from Castiel explains it is a Nachzehrer, a ghoul and vampire-like creature. The wife wakes up and has been turned, kidnapping Dean in the car. She explains she killed her husband for not joining them and the new deputy is the alpha. The alpha is restored and explains he is scared of The Darkness so he is building an army. He will turn Sam, who is walking into a trap, and then they will eat Dean. Dean gets free and shoves copper pennies down the alpha's throat and decapitates him with the Impala's door, killing him and returning his victims to normal humans. Both bruised Winchesters agree to stop The Darkness after they heal, driving off in the battered Impala.
223	5	"Thin Lizzie"	Rashaad Ernesto Green	Nancy Won	November 4, 2015	4X6255	1.64
A young couple is killed in a hotel that used to be the home of Lizzie Borden. Sam and Dean quickly find all the paranormal signs in the hotel are fakes for the tourists. However, one of the hotel owners is killed, along with a man miles away from the hotel who is found by Sidney, the babysitter of his son Jordie. The wife Dawn has an unemotional reaction to her husband's death. Dean meets Len (Jared Gertner), a Lizzie Borden fan, who says he saw a girl named Amara wandering outside the hotel a few nights ago and he hasn't felt normal since he met her. Dean realizes Amara ate Len's soul. Suspecting Dawn to be soulless as well, the Winchesters find her and her lover dead in a house with Jordie tied up. Sidney captures the Winchesters, explaining she also met Amara who said she wanted to help Sidney. Sidney has felt blissful ever since her soul was taken, Amara helping her not care about her abusive childhood. Sidney killed her enemies and Jordie's parents for being abusive and plans to offer the Winchesters to Amara as a gift. Len saves the Winchesters by killing Sidney. Len can feel himself turning darker the longer he is without a soul, so in order to stop himself he turns himself in for all the murders. The Winchesters send Jordie to an aunt and are concerned about Amara growing stronger. Amara watches them as they leave, promising to see Dean soon.
224	6	"Our Little World"	John F. Showalter	Robert Berens	November 11, 2015	4X6256	1.70
Amara eats the soul of a teenager named Goldie and ages slightly upward again. Crowley grounds Amara for sneaking out to eat and tries to convince her that he can be a father and teacher for her, while having her soulless victims killed to keep her a secret. Dean and Sam are still in the area and are called in once Len is killed in jail. Goldie is arrested and the Winchesters capture the assassin meant for her. After killing him, they track Crowley and Amara to an abandoned asylum to kill Amara. Sam fights off several demons while avoiding killing most of them to try and save the human hosts. He also has another vision. Crowley prepares to kill Dean but Amara stops him, declaring she doesn't need him and tortures Crowley into letting Dean go. Amara knows Dean won't kill her because of their link and says she'll soon be strong enough to exact her revenge on God. Meanwhile, Castiel sees Metatron on television and tracks him down, taking the demon tablet. Metatron is stuck as a human and films tragedies to sell to the media for money. Sensing a rage within Castiel, Metatron constantly mocks him, hoping to be killed since he hates being human. Castiel resists this, and gets Metatron to reveal that in order to make the world, God had to sacrifice His sister, The Darkness. Castiel deems Metatron harmless and lets him leave, to the Winchesters' shock. Dean lies and says Amara overpowered him. Sam is horrified to realize his visions are of The Cage in which Michael and Lucifer are locked.
225	7	"Plush"	Tim Andrew	Eric Charmelo & Nicole Snyder	November 18, 2015	4X6257	1.66
After a man is murdered by someone in a bunny mask that won't come off, Sheriff Donna Hanscum calls in the Winchesters to Cottage Grove, Minnesota for help. After learning that the killer suddenly changed after putting the mask on, they come to believe it is a cursed object. Donna's deputy Doug is forced to kill the young man to save Donna, and she and the Winchesters burn the mask and believe it to be over. However, a young woman in a jester mascot outfit brutally attacks the local football coach before being stopped by the school quarterback. After the quarterback tells them that the room suddenly got cold, the Winchesters realize they are dealing with a ghost who is possessing the various costumes and those who wear them. Using rock salt, they are able to free the latest possession victim, who tells them that the costume had recently been donated to the school. The Winchesters and Donna learn that the costumes belonged to a children's performer named Chester Johnson and after his suicide, his sister donated all of his costumes. Realizing Chester is the ghost, Donna and Doug collect all of the costumes and burn them while Dean talks to the first victim's widow and learns that Chester supposedly molested the children of the two victims. At the same time, Sam is unable to stop Chester from possessing another innocent victim and using him to finish off the coach. Chester's sister Rita explains that after she was confronted with the accusations of child molestation, she worried about her own son and helped the two men get to Chester to scare him. In doing so, Chester was accidentally killed and now wants revenge. Possessing Rita's son through the last costume, Chester attacks but Dean is able to remove the costume and Sam burns it, destroying Chester. At the same time, Sam prays to God for guidance on his visions and explains to Dean he thinks that they mean he has to return to Lucifer's Cage and that the answer to The Darkness may be there.
226	8	"Just My Imagination"	Richard Speight Jr.	Jenny Klein	December 2, 2015	4X6258	2.00
A little girl's imaginary friend, Sparkle the unicorn-man, is killed. Sam is shocked to wake up and see his own childhood imaginary friend Sully (Nate Torrence) is real. Sully explains he and Sparkle are Zână who appear to lonely children to cheer them up. Sully had done so for Sam when he wasn't allowed to go on hunts with John and Dean. Sully thought Sam wanted to be something other than a hunter and encouraged him to run away. However, John changed his mind and allowed Sam to join them so Sam rejects Sully as fake and Sully leaves hurt. Sully allows Sam and Dean to see his kind to help catch the killer, but a mermaid imaginary friend is also killed. A third one is stabbed but survives and contacts Sully for help. While Dean tracks the killer, Sam apologizes to Sully and explains his fear of returning to Lucifer's Cage. Sully forgives him and says even heroes can be scared, but they are the only ones brave enough to do what needs to be done. The killer captures Dean, and is revealed to be a young woman named Reese. Reese and her twin sister Audrey were Sully's next children after Sam, but Audrey was killed by a car while playing tag in the street with Sully. Reese read the folklore and paid a witch for the ability to see Zână and a blade that can kill Sully's kind as revenge. Sully offers to die if that is what Reese needs, though the brothers talk her out of killing him. Sully agrees to check in on Reese and wishes Sam luck. Sam admits to Dean he thinks he has to go to the Cage. Dean says there must be another way, but has no idea what that could be.
227	9	"O Brother Where Art Thou?"	Robert Singer	Eugenie Ross-Leming & Brad Buckner	December 9, 2015	4X6259	1.90
A fully grown Amara kills religious preachers in a park and a church as attempts to get God's attention, dismissing religion as manipulation. Sam finally convinces Dean that following the visions is their only choice, and they approach Crowley for a way to communicate with Lucifer in The Cage. Crowley has Rowena captured to read from the Book of the Damned for this purpose and they form a tense alliance. Alone, Dean investigates the church deaths and senses Amara. She transports him away to talk, claiming she only wants to hurt God who supposedly exiled her because she might be better at making creations. She claims that she would rule the world to give everyone bliss like Dean feels with her. After Dean's attempt to stab her fails, Amara kisses Dean saying they are meant to be together ever since he freed her. A low level angel rallies all the angels in Heaven against Amara. He and two others go to arrest her, saying if she resists the combined might of every angel will kill her. Amara kills the three angels and sends Dean back to safety as the sky opens up and strikes her. The others proceed with the plan and Rowena wards The Cage while Sam speaks with Lucifer. Lucifer says The Darkness is equal to God in raw power and offers help if Sam agrees to be his vessel again. Sam refuses as the warding fails to Crowley's shock, though Rowena remains calm. Sam is pulled into The Cage where Lucifer reveals that the release of The Darkness weakened The Cage, that he's been the one sending Sam's visions, and that God was never helping Sam.
228	10	"The Devil in the Details"	Thomas J. Wright	Andrew Dabb	January 20, 2016	4X6260	1.83
Lucifer has approached Rowena in a dream, promising her rewards if she helps him get to Sam. Dean searches for Sam, and Crowley sends him to Billie the Reaper who Sam had recently encountered. Billie lets Dean into Hell with a "witch collar" that allows Crowley to control Rowena. Castiel and a low level angel search to see if Amara survived, while the angel points out that Castiel is more expendable than the Winchesters. Amara survived and kills the angel, then she sends Castiel to Billie with a threat carved into his chest, though the effort it took does appear to weaken her. Meanwhile Lucifer says Sam has gone soft. Last time he fought him, he sacrificed himself to save the world. In recent years Sam and Dean only want to save each other regardless of the cost. Lucifer says making a sacrifice and being his vessel is the only way to stop The Darkness, since God is gone, Gabriel and Raphael are dead, and Michael has supposedly gone insane while imprisoned. Sam refuses, not believing it's guaranteed Lucifer would win against Amara, and even if it was he'd then destroy the world himself. Lucifer pulls Dean and Castiel into The Cage and beats all three of them, though Rowena's spell seems to work to send him away. The brothers agree to find another way to stop Amara while Castiel hangs back. Castiel, having said yes at the last second to be Lucifer's vessel, goes to confront Crowley and Rowena. Lucifer makes sure that Rowena is the only one who could open The Cage again, then he kills her and says he wants to talk to Crowley.
229	11	"Into the Mystic"	John Badham	Robbie Thompson	January 27, 2016	4X6261	1.88
Thirty years ago in Ireland, a man is killed after hearing a strange noise and being attacked. His wife banishes the creature but also dies, leaving only their baby alive. In the present day Sam and Dean investigate a case in a retirement home where one of the residents died in a similar manner. A resident named Mildred sees the creature commit its second kill of the building manager. The brothers realize the creature is a Banshee, driving its victims insane with its voice before feeding on their brains. Sam is briefly captured by a deaf woman posing as a housekeeper named “Marlene”. “Marlene” was the baby who was raised by a hunter after her parents died, her real name is Eileen and her grandfather was a Men of Letters. The banshee's screams also destroyed her hearing. Posing as Castiel, Lucifer searches the bunker for a way to kill Amara and Dean admits his connection to her but asks to keep it a secret from Sam. "Castiel" agrees saying maybe they can use this to draw Amara out. Assuming Mildred is the next target, the Winchesters and Eileen protect her but are caught off guard when the banshee targets Dean. Mildred and Eileen are able to kill it. Eileen continues hunting while Mildred assumes Dean is attracted to someone out there. Later, Sam admits how Lucifer taunted him and apologizes for not looking for Dean while he was in Purgatory. Dean had forgiven him a long time ago. Sam is able to rest soundly, but Dean is still tormented by his thoughts.
230	12	"Don't You Forget About Me"	Stefan Pleszczynski	Nancy Won	February 3, 2016	4X6262	1.87
Sam and Dean are called in by Claire Novak, now living with Sheriff Jody Mills and Alex, saying she has a case. However, Jody says Claire has attacked innocent people in a series of false alarms and is ignoring college, devoting everything to hunting. Meanwhile Alex is doing well in high school with a jock boyfriend Henry. Claire claims the disappearances of three local people must be a case. Both Winchesters caution her at diving too fast into hunting and say she should be more appreciative of Jody. Alex's favorite teacher is killed and hung up the flag pole. Realizing the case is real, the Winchesters learn the school janitor, Rich, is a vampire who kidnaps Jody and Claire. Henry is also a vampire and takes Alex. Rich was a trucker who had tried to help Alex while she was still bait for the vampire nest, however he was turned and then killed his own wife. Rich tracked Alex down, but seeing her misery, he turned Henry and sent him to be her boyfriend to make her happy and then kill her new family of Jody and Claire. Rich and Henry had been feeding on the missing people, and Henry killed the teacher as the first step to hurt Alex. The Winchesters bust in and Claire distracts Rich, allowing Dean to behead him, while Sam lets Claire and Alex kill Henry. The girls show more appreciation to Jody for protecting them, while Claire still wants to be a hunter and Alex wants to focus on her studies for a normal life. The Winchesters leave them as a newly united family.
231	13	"Love Hurts"	Phil Sgriccia	Eric Charmelo & Nicole Snyder	February 10, 2016	4X6263	1.83
In Hudson, Ohio, a babysitter named Stacey is having an affair with her married boss Dan. Stacey's heart is ripped out while looking after his baby alone. Dan admits the affair to Dean and shows him nanny-cam footage that reveals "Dan" killed Stacey. The brothers think it's a shapeshifter but then "Stacey" kills Dan in his office. Dan's wife Melissa knew about the affair but wanted to work things out. Her hairdresser Sonya claimed to be a white witch and gave Melissa a love spell to make Dan fall for her again. The spell is actually a curse, transferred by kissing and is working its way back to the spell-caster, Melissa. "Dan" tries to kill her but Dean kisses her, making the spell target him. Breaking into Sonya's barber shop, the brothers learn that the spell summons a Qareen, which has a heart separate from its body and kills while appearing as its victim's greatest desire. Sam investigates upstairs and is captured by Sonya while Dean is attacked in the basement by "Amara". Dean is able to fight back since the Qareen is not really her. Sonya explains she uses the curse to punish cheating men and the stupid women who still love them. Melissa distracts Sonya, allowing Sam to kill her and stab the Qareen's heart, destroying it. Dean admits to Sam that he desires Amara when he is around her and doesn't think he can kill her even though he wants to. Sam promises he will kill Amara for both of them.
232	14	"The Vessel"	John Badham	Robert Berens	February 17, 2016	4X6264	1.98
In Occupied France in 1943, a Woman of Letters named Delphine Seydoux kills a Nazi general and steals a powerful artifact from him. In the present, Sam discovers that the artifact is a Hand of God and possibly has the power to destroy Amara. Sam and Dean call upon Castiel for information, not knowing he is possessed by Lucifer who has regained control of Hell but lacks the power to defeat Amara. As the Bluefin, the submarine carrying the Hand of God to America sank, Dean has Lucifer transport him into the past to before the sinking, but special warding keeps Lucifer out. Dean locates Delphine and manages to convince her of his mission, but a German destroyer attacks the Bluefin, commanded by the German general who is a member of the Thule Society. In the present, Sam finds a spell that will allow "Castiel" to remove the warding and offers to use his soul to power it. Lucifer reveals himself and nearly kills Sam, but Castiel manages to regain control long enough to stop him and inform Sam of the situation. Unable to defeat the Germans, Delphine unleashes the power of the Hand of God, obliterating the Bluefin and her crew as Lucifer returns Dean to the present. Lucifer reveals himself to Dean and attempts to use the Hand of God, but discovers that its power is expended. As Lucifer is distracted, Sam banishes him with a blood sigil. Dean promises to capture Lucifer and free Castiel who he refuses to believe willingly agreed to possession. Sam informs him that while the wreckage of the Bluefin was never recovered, the German destroyer was found, sunk by the Hand of God, leaving Dean contemplating the sacrifices committed by the Bluefin and her crew.
233	15	"Beyond the Mat"	Jerry Wanek	John Bring & Andrew Dabb	February 24, 2016	4X6265	1.85
After one of their favorite wrestlers apparently commits suicide, Sam and Dean go to pay their respects only for a man at the memorial wrestling show to get murdered with a strange symbol etched into his body. The two quickly figure out that they are dealing with a demon who is collecting souls, but find that none of the wrestlers are possessed. One of the wrestlers, Harley (Mike "The Miz" Mizanin), is kidnapped by one of his fellow wrestlers, Gunner Lawless, who is working for a crossroads demon who is collecting souls to create his own "nest egg" because of the appearance of the Darkness and Lucifer's return. The demon overpowers the Winchesters and orders Lawless to kill Dean. Lawless explains that he had made a deal ten years before and the demon had promised to spare his life if he did its bidding. Dean is able to convince Lawless to help and Lawless frees Dean and kills the demon. Sam and Dean leave Lawless to face the hellhounds at his request. Dean is more determined than ever to stop Lucifer and Amara and to save Castiel. At the same time, Lucifer searches for another Hand of God with no luck. Crowley escapes with the help of another demon and leads her to where he has stashed the Rod of Aaron. The demon turns out to be working for Lucifer, but Crowley expends the Rod's power trying to kill Lucifer and is forced to flee.
234	16	"Safe House"	Stefan Pleszczynski	Robbie Thompson	March 23, 2016	4X6266	1.69
In Grand Rapids, Michigan, a mother is renovating her house when her daughter's bedroom shows signs of a ghost and the girl falls into a coma with a hand-print on her ankle, and the same thing soon happens to her mother. Sam and Dean investigate, discovering Bobby and Rufus had been to the same house around seven years ago to save a mother and son. Told as parallel stories, Bobby and Rufus already burned the bones of any possible ghost but that doesn't solve the problem. Both pairs realize it is a soul eater, an undead being which takes souls to a nest that exists outside of space and time, resembling the house it haunts, while leaving the human bodies to die. Bobby and Rufus don't know how to kill it so they settle for a trap to seal it, which Bobby had previously used in another home in Tennessee. This same seal was broken during the renovations at the start of the Winchesters case. Sam is able to use information from The Men of Letters to find another seal that will kill it, but someone must also place it in the nest. Both Dean and Bobby are taken into the nest and are soon possessed by the soul eater, attacking their partner in the real world. Sam and Rufus fight them off, defeating the soul eater and saving the mothers and children. Due to the nature of the nest, Bobby and Dean's souls are able to see each other just before they wake up. In the past, Bobby heads off to follow a lead on Lilith, while in the present the brothers go off to finish Bobby's case in Tennessee.
235	17	"Red Meat"	Nina Lopez-Corrado	Robert Berens & Andrew Dabb	March 30, 2016	4X6267	1.45
In Grangeville, Idaho, Sam and Dean investigate a werewolf case that leads to Sam getting shot while rescuing a young couple, Corbin and Michelle. Unknown to anyone, Corbin has been bitten and is slowly transforming into a werewolf himself. As Dean refuses to leave Sam, Corbin suffocates Sam, seemingly killing him in order to force Dean to abandon his brother. Dean is able to get the two to the hospital, where he commits suicide with a drug overdose in hopes of convincing a Reaper to bring Sam back. Dean is successfully able to draw in the Reaper Billie who refuses to deal and reveals that Sam is still alive. Before she can take him to the Empty, a doctor is able to revive Dean with adrenaline. At the same time, Sam wakes up and discovers the surviving werewolves have arrived. Sam kills the werewolves and calls Dean to warn him about Corbin. Corbin kills a doctor and a deputy before Dean stops him from hurting Michelle. Corbin nearly kills Dean, but Sam arrives in time to kill Corbin and save his brother. The doctors are able to save Sam and determine that when Corbin tried to kill Sam, his body went into shock and he simply appeared dead. Michelle is devastated by Corbin's death while Dean lies to Sam about what he did while he thought his brother was dead.
236	18	"Hell's Angel"	Phil Sgriccia	Brad Buckner & Eugenie Ross-Leming	April 6, 2016	4X6268	1.75
Crowley secures The Horn of Joshua as the next Hand of God to kill Amara. He calls the Winchesters in to discuss terms. He wants Lucifer sealed back in The Cage first, while Sam wants to use Lucifer and the Horn to kill Amara, and Dean wants Castiel freed first. Meanwhile, Lucifer intimidates the angels of Heaven into working with him to stop Amara. Amara is recovering from the angel's attack with the help of Rowena, who was revived by her inner magic after Lucifer broke her neck. Amara sends a vocal attack into Heaven, scaring everyone; including Rowena who reveals herself to Crowley and the brothers to open The Cage again. Baiting Lucifer with the Horn, the brothers and Crowley try to convince Castiel to force Lucifer out, but Castiel refuses and just wants to wait for the battle with Amara. Lucifer breaks free and attacks the Winchesters; Crowley uses the opportunity to escape. Amara arrives and, after Lucifer is unable to hurt her with the Horn, she captures him and releases the Winchesters, while Rowena escapes. The Winchesters move past their disagreement about Castiel and try to think of another way, theorizing that since Lucifer had fallen he couldn't use a Hand of God's full power. Amara decides to draw out God by torturing an archangel, making Lucifer/Castiel scream in agony.
237	19	"The Chitters"	Eduardo Sánchez	Nancy Won	April 27, 2016	4X6269	1.67
In 1989, two brothers, Jessy and Matty, are fishing in the woods when Matty is abducted by someone with green eyes. In the present, Sam and Dean are called in when the same thing begins happening in the same town. Witnesses report one of the creatures appeared naked while their friend appeared to be shaking and buzzing when they saw them. Speaking with a local, the Winchesters learn of "the Chitters" superstition, where people have orgies in the woods and then disappear. Dean is attacked in the forest but saved by two hunters, Cesar and an adult Jessy. They explain that these monsters, revealed as cicada-like creatures called Bisaan, reappear every 27 years and use human bodies to mate for a few days. The hosts die off once the eggs are laid and the next generation hatches underground to repeat the process. While Cesar and Dean search for the burrow in the woods, Sam and Jessy confront the sheriff from 27 years ago. The sheriff had attacked the burrow but saw his own daughter was turned and was forced to kill her. Wanting to hide what happened, he told Jessy he was just a crazy kid, enraging him. Dean and Cesar find the burrow in a mine and kill the Bisaan, however the current hosts are already dead so they burn down the eggs. After finding Matty's body and giving him a hunter's funeral, Dean considers recruiting Jessy and Cesar to help fight Amara. However, he backs off when the two say they want to give up hunting and just live happily as a couple. The Winchesters let them have their peace.
238	20	"Don't Call Me Shurley"	Robert Singer	Robbie Thompson	May 4, 2016	4X6270	1.54
A homeless Metatron scrounges through the garbage for food before being transported to a bar where he meets the author Chuck Shurley. Initially dismissive, Metatron is stunned when Chuck reveals he is God. He wants Metatron to help in editing his autobiography and prefers to be known as Chuck. Chuck reveals he's been traveling the world and only wants to talk about things he's done as a human. Metatron's criticism of Chuck's writing gets him to reveal he has some sympathy for Lucifer turning into a villain because of the Mark of Cain and the burden of containing Amara. Chuck likes the Winchesters and constantly brought back Castiel for them, but their quest to destroy the Mark is what freed Amara, so he is done helping them. Since God is 'Being' while Amara is 'Nothingness', Chuck became lonely and thought by creating things he could convince Amara to be better, but she just destroyed everything. After barely locking her away and seeing all the conflict both humans and angels create, Chuck walked away, letting them sort it out for themselves, and he sees no point in fighting Amara again. Metatron is disgusted that Chuck has become a coward. While humans may have flaws, they also create beauty, art and love; they are God's greatest creations because they never give up. Chuck is briefly enraged but goes back to writing. Meanwhile, the Winchesters investigate a murder-suicide and soon learn it is a stronger version of the infectious fog produced by Amara that is making the townspeople go mad. Sam becomes infected with the fog, but it doesn't affect Dean, who holds onto Sam and yells for Amara to stop this. Chuck sings a song at the bar, as a shocked Metatron reads the final pages of Chuck's autobiography. The fog and infections disappear and all the townspeople, including those who were killed, are restored to life. Dean finds his old amulet glowing in Sam's pocket, and they follow it to the middle of the street where it leads the Winchesters to Chuck. Chuck greets the shocked brothers and tells them they should talk.
239	21	"All in the Family"	Thomas J. Wright	Eugenie Ross-Leming & Brad Buckner	May 11, 2016	4X6271	1.75
After the Winchesters express doubt about him, Chuck transports them back to the Bunker where he brings in the spirit of Kevin Tran (Osric Chau) to vouch for him. Chuck then sends Kevin to his final rest in Heaven. Chuck explains that he had once been much more hands-on with the world, but didn't seem to be making a difference so he left the world to find its own way, but he has returned to face Amara. At the same time, Amara continues to torture Lucifer, and she contacts Dean to send a message to God about Lucifer's state. While this is going on, another of Amara's fogs wipes out a whole town but results in a man named Donatello being called as a Prophet. As the Winchesters go to meet with Donatello, Metatron contacts them and reveals that Chuck intends to sacrifice himself to Amara to stop her destruction of the universe. After Dean fails to convince Chuck to stop his plan, the Winchesters team up with Metatron and Donatello to rescue Lucifer. To distract Amara, Dean meets with her, and Amara suggests that he give up his humanity and become a part of her instead. Eventually Amara realizes that Dean has betrayed her and departs to stop Lucifer's rescue. Donatello is able to lead Sam and Metatron to Lucifer, who agrees to put aside his differences with God to battle Amara. Metatron frees Lucifer and stays behind to hold off Amara when Lucifer can't teleport them out. After Metatron's attack fails, Amara implodes him into nothingness. Amara nearly kills Sam, Lucifer and Donatello, but Chuck teleports them back to the Bunker. There, Lucifer and Chuck greet each other for the first time in millennia before Chuck heals Lucifer's injuries. The Winchesters send Donatello on his way, and Dean informs Sam of Amara's plans for him.
240	22	"We Happy Few"	John Badham	Robert Berens	May 18, 2016	4X6272	1.59
Though Lucifer and Chuck are reluctant to work together, Chuck eventually admits Lucifer was his favorite who he thought would be strong enough to bear the Mark of Cain. When that was proven wrong, Chuck was angry at himself, confessing that was part of the reason he banished Lucifer along with protecting humanity. With Michael in no condition to fight and not enough time to revive Raphael and Gabriel, Lucifer/Castiel and the Winchesters recruit the angels in Heaven, Crowley's forces, and Rowena and a few witches. Despite their bickering they all agree to weaken Amara and allow Chuck to trap her in the Mark. Since both Chuck and Amara are essential to reality, Chuck won't kill her and wants to seal her within the Mark to be carried by Sam this time. Though Dean protests, he eventually agrees. Amara eats Donatello's soul and breaks into the bunker but willingly follows Rowena's trap to find her brother. Amara kills the other witches and walks away from both the angels' combined smite and an assault from Crowley and his demons. However, the combined attacks of everyone weaken her enough that she is prepared to be banished by Chuck. She laments how she did love her brother and gets him to admit that part of the reason he created things was to rule over them, and that he hated how they were equals. She resists when Chuck tries to seal her into Sam, stopping the Winchesters, apparently killing Lucifer and gravely wounding Chuck. Amara warns Chuck is not dead yet because he is going to watch her destroy everything ever created.
241	23	"Alpha and Omega"	Phil Sgriccia	Andrew Dabb	May 25, 2016	4X6273	1.84
Sam and Dean check on Lucifer and Chuck to find Lucifer gone and Castiel back, and Chuck fatally injured. As a result of Chuck's injuries, the sun is now dying and the world along with it. Realizing that the only chance for the world to survive is to kill the Darkness along with Chuck, the Winchesters begin gathering ghosts to create a bomb to destroy the Darkness. With the help of Billie the Reaper, they are able to get the needed souls which are inserted into Dean. Chuck sends Dean to Amara who has started to regret her actions, and Dean convinces her that revenge is not worth it. Amara and Chuck reconcile, and Amara heals Chuck of the damage she did to him. The two then leave the Earth, but not before Amara tells Dean she is going to give him what he wants most for helping her, and Chuck removes the souls from Dean's body. At the bunker, Castiel is banished by a woman who identifies herself as Lady Antonia Bevell of the London chapter of the Men of Letters. Antonia tells Sam the Men of Letters have sent her to bring Sam in for punishment for his actions, and she fires her gun apparently at Sam as he tries to talk her down. Making his way through the woods, Dean finds his resurrected mother.

== Production ==
Supernatural was renewed by The CW for an eleventh season on January 11, 2015. Jensen Ackles directed the first-produced episode of the season, titled "The Bad Seed", which was the third-aired episode. Emily Swallow was cast in a recurring role in July 2015, portraying Amara, a femme fatale. The season features a bottle episode, titled "Baby", in which the entire episode takes place inside the Impala. Richard Speight Jr., who has a recurring role on the series as the Archangel Gabriel, directed the eighth episode of the season. In May 2016, it was announced that Jeremy Carver would be leaving the series, and that Robert Singer and Andrew Dabb would take over the role of showrunner for the twelfth season.

== Reception ==
The review aggregator website Rotten Tomatoes gives the 11th season a 90% approval rating based on 10 reviews, with an average score of 7.6/10. The critics consensus reads, "It may not rewrite the Supernatural playbook, but by introducing an enthralling new threat, this season becomes another high-stakes outing for the Winchesters."

=== Ratings ===
Viewership and ratings per episode of Supernatural season 11
No.	Title	Air date	Rating/share (18–49)	Viewers (millions)	DVR (18–49)	DVR viewers (millions)	Total (18–49)	Total viewers (millions)
1	"Out of the Darkness, Into the Fire"	October 7, 2015	0.9/3	1.94	0.6	1.13	1.5	3.07
2	"Form and Void"	October 14, 2015	0.8/3	1.85	—N/a	0.94	—N/a	2.80
3	"The Bad Seed"	October 21, 2015	0.6/2	1.59	0.5	0.87	1.1	2.46
4	"Baby"	October 28, 2015	0.8/2	2.04	—N/a	0.99	—N/a	3.12
5	"Thin Lizzie"	November 4, 2015	0.6/2	1.64	0.5	1.01	1.1	2.65
6	"Our Little World"	November 11, 2015	0.7/2	1.70	0.6	1.06	1.3	2.76
7	"Plush"	November 18, 2015	0.7/3	1.66	0.5	1.02	1.2	2.68
8	"Just My Imagination"	December 2, 2015	0.9/3	2.00	—N/a	1.04	—N/a	3.04
9	"O Brother Where Art Thou?"	December 9, 2015	0.7/2	1.90	0.6	1.06	1.3	2.96
10	"The Devil in the Details"	January 20, 2016	0.7/2	1.83	0.5	1.02	1.2	2.85
11	"Into the Mystic"	January 27, 2016	0.7/2	1.88	0.5	0.99	1.2	2.88
12	"Don't You Forget About Me"	February 3, 2016	0.7/2	1.87	0.5	0.91	1.2	2.77
13	"Love Hurts"	February 10, 2016	0.8/2	1.83	—N/a	1.02	—N/a	2.85
14	"The Vessel"	February 17, 2016	0.8/2	1.98	—N/a	0.95	—N/a	2.94
15	"Beyond the Mat"	February 24, 2016	0.7/2	1.85	0.5	1.00	1.2	2.85
16	"Safe House"	March 23, 2016	0.6/2	1.69	0.6	1.10	1.2	2.79
17	"Red Meat"	March 30, 2016	0.6/2	1.45	0.5	1.05	1.1	2.50
18	"Hell's Angel"	April 6, 2016	0.7/3	1.75	0.5	1.00	1.2	2.75
19	"The Chitters"	April 27, 2016	0.7/2	1.67	—N/a	1.00	—N/a	2.67
20	"Don't Call Me Shurley"	May 4, 2016	0.6/2	1.54	0.6	1.23	1.2	2.77
21	"All in the Family"	May 11, 2016	0.7/2	1.75	—N/a	0.89	—N/a	2.65
22	"We Happy Few"	May 18, 2016	0.6/2	1.59	0.6	1.10	1.2	2.72
23	"Alpha and Omega"	May 25, 2016	0.7/3	1.84	0.6	1.15	1.3	2.99
