= Brother's Keeper (Supernatural) =

- Supernatural episode
- Episode no.: Season 10; Episode 23
- Directed by: Phil Sgriccia
- Written by: Jeremy Carver
- Cinematography by: Serge Ladouceur
- Editing by: Donald L. Koch
- Production code: 4X5822
- Original air date: May 20, 2015
- Running time: 42 minutes

Guest appearances
- Ruth Connell as Rowena; Julian Richings as Death

Episode chronology
← Previous "The Prisoner"	Next → "Out of the Darkness, Into the Fire"
- Supernatural season 10

"Brother's Keeper" is the twenty-third episode and season finale of the paranormal drama television series Supernatural's season 10, and the 218th overall. The episode was written by showrunner Jeremy Carver and directed by executive producer Phil Sgriccia. It was first broadcast on May 20, 2015, on The CW. In the episode, Dean kills a hunter and decides to summon Death to help him with the Mark of Cain as Sam tries to stop him. Meanwhile, Castiel and Crowley meet with Rowena in an attempt to destroy the Mark of Cain.

The episode received acclaim from critics, who praised the resolution of the Mark of Cain and the cliffhanger ending.

== Plot ==
Dean (Jensen Ackles) continues to hunt demons with a new partner, Rudy. Investigating the death of a girl in Superior, Nebraska, the Mark continues to corrupt him. Dean finds the vampire holding the girl's friend, he kills the creature and makes him kill Rudy. Meanwhile, Sam (Jared Padalecki) and Castiel (Misha Collins) make Rowena (Ruth Connell) cast a spell to destroy the Mark of Cain. She agrees if she gains her freedom and Nadya's Codex. She realizes the spell requires to sacrifice her greatest love. Castiel enters her mind to see her greatest love is Oskar: a boy she befriended 300 years ago and granted immortality.

Dean has visions of people he has hurt or killed and destroys his entire hotel room to stop them. Sam tracks him and arrives at his hotel room, but Dean is gone. He finds a note and the keys to the Impala, writing "She's all yours." Castiel summons Crowley (Mark A. Sheppard) to help him with the ingredients, although Crowley is still angry after Sam tried to kill him. Crowley realizes the man he met at the diner in the previous episode is Oskar.

Dean arrives at a bar where he summons Death (Julian Richings), asking the Pale Horseman to kill him as the Mark is affecting him severely, using a smorgasbord of junk food as enticement. Death refuses, stating that he can't kill Dean without the Mark being passed over to someone else. He tells him that before the time, there was a being called The Darkness. God and his archangels managed to lock it away in a prison with the Mark acting as a lock and God entrusted it on Lucifer. But the Mark corrupted Lucifer, which caused him to transfer it to Cain, and then to Dean. As Dean says he won't pass the Mark, Death says he can relocate Dean to a place where he will do no harm if he kills Sam so he doesn't rescue him.

Dean calls Sam to say goodbye and tells Sam that the world would be better without them trying to protect it, citing Charlie's death. They fight over the difference and Dean finally beats Sam. Dean then takes the Death's scythe to kill Sam. Sam manages to show Dean his importance in family and all his memories. At the last moment, Dean instead kills Death with the scythe, who crumbles into dust. Crowley brings Oskar with Castiel and Rowena, who sadly kills Oskar to complete the spell. The spell causes a lightning bolt to finally erase the Mark of Cain from Dean's arm.

Rowena takes the Book of the Damned and immobilizes Crowley and Castiel. In revenge for making her kill Oskar, she casts a spell on Castiel, causing him to attack an immobile Crowley. As Sam and Dean leave the bar, lightning begins striking multiple places in the ground, causing columns of black smoke to roll into an enormous force, The Darkness. They try to leave in the Impala, only to be stuck in a pothole. The season ends as The Darkness overruns the Impala, with Sam and Dean inside.

== Reception ==
=== Viewers ===
The episode was watched by 1.73 million viewers with a 0.7/2 share among adults aged 18 to 49. This was a 2% decrease in viewership from the previous episode, which was watched by 1.75 million viewers. This means that 0.7 percent of all households with televisions watched the episode, while 2 percent of all households watching television at that time watched it. Overall, the tenth season of Supernatural averaged 2.48 million viewers, ranking 156th out of 188 shows. This marked a 12% decrease from the previous season, which averaged 2.81 million viewers.

=== Critical reviews ===
Professional ratings
Review scores
Source	Rating
IGN	8.8/10
TV Fanatic	4.6/5
Den of Geek	5/5 stars

"Brother's Keeper" received acclaim. Amy Ratcliffe of IGN gave the episode a "great" 8.8 out of 10 and wrote in his verdict, "The Mark of Cain business is finally resolved. That alone is worth celebrating, but its removal had unexpected consequences with the death of Death and the unleashing of the Darkness. While it's disappointing that no one else mentioned the Darkness (like Cain), it sets up a big bad for Season 11 and the Winchesters need to unite against a common enemy right now and rebuild – after they get out from under that inky cloud."

Hunter Bishop of TV Overmind, wrote, "Overall, I think I'd give a B to this season. They had a lot of cool stuff going on, but it all felt disparate. I wanted more cohesion of ideas, plots, and characters. I would also like to stop the Sam Winchester character assassination and allow him a chance to breath. I would also like clarification on whether that was actually Dean Winchester under the influence of The Mark, because last I checked The Mark made you hyper-aggressive like an animal, not a slut-shaming douchebag. Dean wasn't a demon when he made those comments, so I'm a little confused. Hopefully, The Darkness lives up to my already-high hopes and we get a really excellent eleventh season of Supernatural. Or, it could get bogged down in the execution of so many massive and far-reaching plot threads, and lose grip of many of the storylines, like what happened this season. I would also like a healthy main cast dose of Rowena, who was the best and most interesting part of this solid season of television. Ruth Connell was amazing, and played her part with nuance and menace. I really hope she sticks around for a while."

Samantha Highfill of EW stated: "'She's all yours' might very well be the saddest words in the history of Supernatural —a.k.a. Save My Brother or Die Trying – because the moment that Dean gives up Baby is the moment that you know he's given up all hope. And yet, that was only one of the memorable moments in tonight's beast of a finale, which once again did the thing that this show does best: Put a Supernatural twist on a Biblical story. And I don't know about you all but watching the arrival of The Darkness – which was sort of Sam's fault for making Rowena do the spell – took me right back to Sam letting Lucifer out of his cage. And that twist ended up giving us season 5, a.k.a. my favorite of the series. So if The Darkness is anything like Lucifer, I'm in."

Sean McKenna from TV Fanatic, gave a 4.6 star rating out of 5, stating: "So many questions and possibilities for Supernatural Season 11 have me pondering about what just happened and what's to come. This was an engaging finale, especially when it came to the scenes with Sam and Dean, and while I'm still trying to go over everything that went down, I'm certainly looking forward to seeing what's next."

Bridget LaMonica from Den of Geek, gave a perfect 5 star rating out of 5, stating: "The episode asks the hard question: 'What is evil?' Has all the good the boys have done over the years - y'know, saving people, hunting things - make up for all the mistakes they've made as well? The people who died by accident, the guy whose soul Sam sacrifices, and more recently the heroic death of Charlie. Are the boys, even possessed or Marked or led astray, still fundamentally good? Thus ends Supernatural Philosophy 101. Hand in your homework before next class."

MaryAnn Sleasman of TV.com wrote, "That went better than expected! I readily admit that I'm a cynical bastard who routinely falls into the trap of Supernatural's finale hype-machine only to be disappointed when it fails to meet expectations. After a bumpy season full of awkward pacing, dropped storylines, uneven characterizations, and the occasional bout of predictability, my hopes for 'Brother's Keeper' weren't at an all-time high. All signs pointed to an inevitable Winchester death and I just didn't have it in me. When does it stop? When does this codependent nonsense stop?"
