= Out of the Darkness, Into the Fire =

- Supernatural episode
- Episode no.: Season 11; Episode 1
- Directed by: Robert Singer
- Written by: Jeremy Carver
- Cinematography by: Serge Ladouceur
- Editing by: Nicole Baer
- Production code: 4X6252
- Original air date: October 7, 2015
- Running time: 42 minutes

Guest appearances
- Emily Swallow as Amara/The Darkness; Laci J. Mailey as Deputy Jenna Nickerson; Aaron Hill as Mike Schneider

Episode chronology
← Previous "Brother's Keeper"	Next → "Form and Void"
- Supernatural season 11

"Out of the Darkness, Into the Fire" is the first episode of the paranormal drama television series Supernatural's season 11, and the 219th overall. The episode was written by showrunner Jeremy Carver and directed by executive consultant Robert Singer. It was first broadcast on October 7, 2015 on The CW. In the episode, Sam and Dean have to deal with the consequence of having freed The Darkness into the world while Crowley recovers after Castiel's attack. With this episode, Supernatural became the longest-running science fiction TV show in North America, surpassing Smallville.

The episode received critical acclaim, with critics praising the tone for the season and the new threat as well as the character development.

== Plot ==
The season picks up exactly where it left off; Dean (Jensen Ackles) finds himself surrounded by the black smoke and finds a mysterious woman (Emily Swallow), revealed to be The Darkness. She tells him that's she's finally free, even going far as to say she didn't even know what The Death was and that they will always help each other as they're bound together. Sam (Jared Padalecki) wakes up in the Impala, where the black smoke is gone. He looks for Dean and finally discovers him in a field.

They soon drive to a highway where they discover dead police and medical officers. They are attacked by a medical officer, who's gunned down by a sheriff's deputy named Jenna Nickerson (Laci J. Mailey). She states that people began attacking each other like rabid dogs, revealing to have black veins in their necks. As she is injured, they take her to the hospital, where the administrators are also dead. Sam discovers an infected man trying to kill a person in a closet. The infected man dies and the man, is holding a newborn baby he just received when his wife died.

Meanwhile, Crowley (Mark A. Sheppard) evades Castiel's (Misha Collins) attack by leaving his vessel. Castiel is also feeling guilty about his actions and is being attacked by a family of hunters where he stood the past hours. Crowley takes on a female vessel. Crowley later retains his true vessel and is notified by his employees that The Darkness has been unleashed and that everyone on Hell heard a warning coming from Lucifer's Cage. That night, Castiel prays for help as police officers are cornering him. Two angels arrive to take Castiel for custody but they instead kidnap him for torture.

The infected man, Mike (Aaron Hill), states that he's infected too, but Dean speaks in private with Sam and Jenna to kill Mike before he morphs and kills them. When more infected people arrive, Sam decides to stay in the hospital to distract them while Dean and Jenna leave with the baby at Mike's request, also calling the baby Amara. Sam manages to attack the infected people but discovers he's infected too. Dean and Jenna stop in a shop, and while Jenna changes Amara's diaper, it's revealed the baby is carrying the Mark of Cain, revealing that the baby is The Darkness.

== Reception ==
=== Viewers ===
The episode was watched by 1.94 million viewers with a 0.9/3 share among adults aged 18 to 49. This was a 12% increase in viewership from the previous episode, which was watched by 1.73 million viewers; but was a 23% decrease in viewership from the previous season premiere, which was watched by 2.50 million viewers. This means that 0.9 percent of all households with televisions watched the episode, while 3 percent of all households watching television at that time watched it. Supernatural ranked as the second most watched program on The CW in the day, behind Arrow.

=== Critical reviews ===
Professional ratings
Review scores
Source	Rating
IGN	8.4
TV Fanatic	4.4/5 stars

"Out of the Darkness, Into the Fire" received universal acclaim. Amy Ratcliffe of IGN gave the episode a "great" 8.4 out of 10 and wrote in her verdict, "The stakes seem to get bigger with every season of Supernatural, and they've effectively raised them with The Darkness. The Winchesters need to get back to their core mission of saving people, and this is already set up as the big bad that could unite them – but they ruined some of what they set up by having Sam hide something from Dean. The episode didn't pack quite the punch it could have, but it did a fine job of setting the stage and showing us that the Winchesters might be going back to their roots."

Hunter Bishop of TV Overmind, wrote, "The brothers have to change, and they have to change now. I suspect they'll defeat The Darkness, or at least corral it; they are, after all, the closest things to real superheroes as you'll ever find. But if they are faced with the choice of living a life without the other, and letting the world burn, they have to choose the former. For the show's sake, for the people on it, and for the audience that has devoted 11 years to it, the Winchesters have to change. Or else all these bodies, and all this blood, and all of those broken homes mean nothing. Let's hope Sam and Dean learn that sooner rather than later, and end the story as the heroes, instead of the ones who destroyed everything."

Samantha Highfill of EW stated: "Welcome back, everyone! Yes, I'm welcoming you back to a world that's covered in literal darkness and where Sam has once again found a way to put his life in danger — but still, feels kind of good, right? Overall, this hour reminded me a lot of the apocalypse days, or even the Croatoan virus — the deserted town, the infected individuals, the general sense of death and destruction. So let's break down what happened this week, or as I like to call it: The Winchester Boys and the Case of the Mysterious Darkness."

Sean McKenna from TV Fanatic, gave a 4.4 star rating out of 5, stating: "Overall, this was an engaging episode that did a good job of focusing on the brothers and setting up what feels like a compelling new direction with the Darkness. I know it's early, and Supernatural usually does premieres well, but I can't help but be excited to get back on the road with Sam and Dean."

MaryAnn Sleasman of TV.com wrote, "I'm so happy, you guys. Hellatus was long and cold and sad. It was fraught with worry and doubt—what if Supernatural returned and it was terrible? Don't lie, you know it to be true. The utter disappointment that was 'Exile on Main Street' still stings when I think about it. The Js and the writers and Jeremy Carver himself have been saying all summer long that Season 11 will herald a return to basics for Dean and Sam. I wasn't sure how to take this news initially. After all, the Winchesters have evolved too far to simply go back to the good old days of prank wars and credit card fraud."
