= O Brother Where Art Thou? (Supernatural) =

- Supernatural episode
- Episode no.: Season 11; Episode 9
- Directed by: Robert Singer
- Written by: Eugenie Ross-Leming; Brad Buckner
- Cinematography by: Serge Ladouceur
- Editing by: James Pickel
- Production code: 4X6259
- Original air date: December 9, 2015
- Running time: 42 minutes

Guest appearances
- Ruth Connell as Rowena; Emily Swallow as The Darkness; Mark Pellegrino as Lucifer

Episode chronology
← Previous "Just My Imagination"	Next → "The Devil in the Details"
- Supernatural season 11

"O Brother Where Art Thou?" is the 9th episode and midseason finale of the paranormal drama television series Supernatural's season 11, and the 227th overall. The episode was written by co-executive producers Eugenie Ross-Leming & Brad Buckner and directed by executive consultant Robert Singer. It was first broadcast on December 9, 2015, on The CW. In the episode, Sam decides to go with Crowley to Hell to face Lucifer in the Cage for answers about the Darkness while Dean meets with Amara, who is unleashing her power upon the world.

The episode received positive reviews with critics praising the shocking ending but some noted God's absence.

== Plot ==
Amara (Emily Swallow) kills a group of preachers in a park in an attempt to lure God. Sam (Jared Padalecki) is still trying to convince Dean (Jensen Ackles) to return to the Cage, stating that he can know how to kill the Darkness.

They contact Crowley (Mark A. Sheppard) who may know how to enter. He decides to use a spell from the Book of the Damned as a way to neutralize Lucifer from leaving the Cage. He captures Rowena (Ruth Connell) so she can translate it with their supervision. Dean investigates the killings and deduces Amara is responsible. While walking through a park, Dean encounters Amara. She transports them to an isolated land where they talk and she states that she killed the preachers so God could face her.

Sam, Crowley and Rowena go through Hell, reaching the Cage point. Rowena prepares a ritual and the Cage emerges from the dark, revealing Lucifer (Mark Pellegrino) inside. He seems to be an expert about the Darkness and knows how to stop it, but only if Sam accepts to be his vessel again. Meanwhile, Dean attempts to kill Amara with the angel blade onto her but it shatters. Amara says he can't resist and they kiss. Soon, low-level angels arrive to escort Amara to Heaven for trial, otherwise, the angels in Heaven will unleash a powerful thunder. She kills all of them and transports Dean back to the park as the angels release the thunder onto her.

In Hell, the Cage begins to lose the effect of the spell and Sam is immediately transported to the Cage. While Crowley stares in shock and confusion, Rowena tells them they need to leave. Lucifer reveals to Sam that he was in fact the one who gave him the visions and all the messages, not God. It was just a way to bring him to the Cage as the only way out is being his vessel.

== Reception ==
=== Viewers ===
The episode was watched by 1.90 million viewers with a 0.7/2 share among adults aged 18 to 49. This was a 5% decrease in viewership from the previous episode, which was watched by 2.00 million viewers from a 0.9/3 share in the 18-49 demographics. 0.7 percent of all households with televisions watched the episode, while 2 percent of all households watching television at that time watched it. Supernatural ranked as the second most watched program on The CW in the day, behind Arrow.

=== Critical reviews ===
Professional ratings
Review scores
Source	Rating
IGN	8.6
TV Fanatic	4.4/5

"O Brother Where Art Thou?" received positive reviews from critics. Amy Ratcliffe of IGN gave the episode a "great" 8.6 out of 10 and wrote in her verdict, "Supernatural's midseason finale left us with not one big bad, but two. The twist of having Sam's last ditch effort be a trick was brutal yet so smart. But have the writers painted themselves into a corner? It's going to take a lot for Sam to extricate himself and for the Winchesters to hold back the Darkness."

Hunter Bishop of TV Overmind wrote, "We've been told that we were being given one story, but the subtext says different. All of the problems that the Winchesters have faced, they have buried, but never destroyed. They've been running for so long, and in the same direction, that they've forgotten what it means to actually score a victory. It's been one setback after another; one close shave after another; one last-second reprieve after another."

Samantha Highfill of EW stated: "Well, that was intense. I can't say that I ever imagined an episode where I would not only get Lucifer back, but I'd also get an equally captivating, even more powerful villain in addition to him. But that's precisely what we got in this revealing hour, in which Sam faced the man he went to Hell to destroy all those years ago and Dean faced...his soulmate? We'll get to that."

Sean McKenna from TV Fanatic, gave a 4.4 star rating out of 5, stating: "But even with some of my misgivings, I was engaged for most of the midseason finale. There were even times where it felt like a season finale – except we don't have to wait a whole year to find out what happens next. And of course, Pellegrino was a standout as Lucifer. If anything, the episode really has me looking forward to seeing just where the Darkness storyline will go, and what the aftermath of Lucifer and Sam will be. And who knows, maybe God will be stepping in soon?"

MaryAnn Sleasman of TV.com wrote, "'O Brother Where Art Thou' is the darkest fall finale we've had in some time. Sam is back in Lucifer's cage. Dean tried — and failed — to end the Darkness. When Supernatural decides to crush its viewers' souls and abandon all hope just in time for the holiday season, ain't nothing gonna stop that pain-train from rolling. I hate this show. (I love this show.)"

Bridget LaMonica of Den of Geek wrote, "The ending scene was nail-bitingly intense. The wards around Lucifer's cage break down, and Sam is spirited into the cage with Lucifer who tries his best to pick up on the harassment he inflicted upon Sam years ago. Sam, showing a great deal of bravery and faith, closes his eyes and looks calm for a few moments, remarking how this is how his vision went. Lucifer has a bit of a laugh at Sam's expense because he is actually the one who sent those visions. There have been a number of times in Supernatural when we've seen Sam in terror, but that moment in which he loses all hope and a single tear falls down his cheek hit hard."
