= LOTUS (Supernatural) =

- Supernatural episode
- Episode no.: Season 12; Episode 8
- Directed by: Phil Sgriccia
- Written by: Eugenie Ross-Leming; Brad Buckner
- Cinematography by: Serge Ladouceur
- Editing by: James Pickel
- Production code: T13.19958
- Original air date: December 8, 2016
- Running time: 42 minutes

Guest appearances
- Ruth Connell as Rowena; David Haydn-Jones as Arthur Ketch; Courtney Ford as Kelly Kline

Episode chronology
← Previous "Rock Never Dies"	Next → "First Blood"
- Supernatural season 12

"LOTUS" is the eight episode and midseason finale of the paranormal drama television series Supernatural's season 12, and the 249th overall. The episode was written by executive producers Eugenie Ross-Leming and Brad Buckner and directed by executive producer Phil Sgriccia. It was first broadcast on December 8, 2016, on The CW. In the episode, Lucifer possesses influential people, going as far as to possess the President of the United States. Using his new power, he tries to stop Sam and Dean from catching him.

The episode received mixed-to-positive reviews with critics criticizing Lucifer's motives and actions in the episode.

== Plot ==
Lucifer begins possessing people of power and influence, eventually possessing Jefferson Rooney, the President of the United States. While possessing Rooney, Lucifer conceives a powerful half-angel Nephilim with Rooney's unsuspecting staffer Kelly Kline (Courtney Ford), while his actions draw the attention of Sam (Jared Padalecki), Dean (Jensen Ackles), Crowley (Mark A. Sheppard), Castiel (Misha Collins), and Rowena (Ruth Connell). Lucifer sends the Secret Service to kill the Winchesters, but they are rescued by Arthur Ketch (David Haydn-Jones), who provides them with a device capable of expelling any angel or demon from their vessel. To draw Lucifer out into the open, Crowley kidnaps Kelly. They are able to convince her of the truth and she calls Lucifer to a motel room where the Winchesters, Castiel, Crowley, and Rowena ambush him. Using Arthur's device, Sam is able to exorcise Lucifer from Rooney and Rowena casts a spell believed to banish him back to his cage. However, the Winchesters are arrested by the Secret Service, who believe they were attempting to assassinate the President, and rather than aborting the Nephilim, Kelly flees from Castiel.

== Reception ==
=== Viewers ===
The episode was watched by 1.73 million viewers with a 0.6/2 share among adults aged 18 to 49. This was a 4% decrease in viewership from the previous episode, which was watched by 1.80 million viewers with a 0.6/2 in the 18-49 demographics. This means that 0.6 percent of all households with televisions watched the episode, while 2 percent of all households watching television at that time watched it. Supernatural ranked as the second most watched program on The CW in the day, behind Legends of Tomorrow.

=== Critical reviews ===
"LOTUS" received mixed-to-positive reviews. Matt Fowler of IGN gave the episode a "great" 8.3 out of 10 and wrote in his verdict: "'Lotus' was a fun, twisted ride that made for a satisfying midseason finale. It was more effective though as an end to the Lucifer story (for now) than it was as set up for the second half of the season. Kelly wanting to keep the nephilim didn't feel quite right. Wouldn't she assume, like anyone who can guess at horror movies, that Lucifer can come back through his own baby? Also, it just gives our heroes another person to track down (while hitting dead ends and doing monster-of-the-week work)."

Sean McKenna from TV Fanatic, gave a 2.4 star rating out of 5, stating: "I wanted to like this episode and hoped it would be a major upswing from Supernatural Season 12 Episode 7. But it just felt lackluster for most of it and spent far too much time with Lucifer doing not much as the president. There certainly could be some interesting story to come from Lucifer's baby, but the contrived ending left me scratching my head rather than exuberantly looking forward to what's next."

Samantha Highfill from EW gave the episode a "B" and wrote, "And yet, it sets up a lot of potential drama for when we return next year. As much as I didn't believe how it happened, there's a certain element to Sam and Dean in jail that I can appreciate. After getting through hell and purgatory, it's human jail that they can't escape. (Then again, do we believe that someone couldn’t get them out?) Altogether, I almost wish the president story line spanned more than one episode because I feel like there was more fun to be had there. But I suppose we'll take what we can get."
