= Hell's Angel (Supernatural) =

- Supernatural episode
- Episode no.: Season 11; Episode 18
- Directed by: Phil Sgriccia
- Written by: Brad Buckner; Eugenie Ross-Leming
- Cinematography by: Serge Ladouceur
- Editing by: James Pickel
- Production code: 4X6268
- Original air date: April 6, 2016
- Running time: 42 minutes

Guest appearances
- Ruth Connell as Rowena; Emily Swallow as Amara/The Darkness; Mark Pellegrino as Lucifer

Episode chronology
← Previous "Red Meat"	Next → "The Chitters"
- Supernatural season 11

"Hell's Angel" is the eighteenth episode of the paranormal drama television series Supernatural's season 11, and the 236th overall. The episode was written by co-executive producers Brian Buckner & Eugenie Ross-Leming and directed by executive producer Phil Sgriccia. It was first broadcast on April 6, 2016 on The CW. In the episode, Lucifer tries to reach Heaven in an attempt to ascend to power while Crowley states to Sam and Dean that there's a way to lock Amara away.

The episode received positive reviews from critics, praising the new character development for Lucifer and Amara.

== Plot ==
On the An-Nafud Desert, Saudi Arabia, Crowley (Mark A. Sheppard) retrieves the Horn of Joshua, a Hand of God, from a man who sold his soul. He kills him and escapes back to America where he offers Sam (Jared Padalecki) and Dean (Jensen Ackles) a deal: he'll give them the Horn if they retrieve Lucifer from Castiel's (Misha Collins) body and send him back to the cage.

Rowena (Ruth Connell) tends to Amara's (Emily Swallow) wounds. It turns out Rowena cast a spell before Lucifer snapped her neck to survive. Meanwhile, Lucifer arrives at Heaven to hold a meeting with the angels, proposing to lock away The Darkness as long as they let him stay in Heaven. With her power restored, Amara sends a vocal attack into Heaven, provoking Rowena to leave her and return with the Winchesters and Crowley.

Sam, Dean, Crowley and Rowena invoke Lucifer. They use a spell to communicate with Castiel, but Lucifer manages to regain control of the body. Crowley escapes and gets inside Lucifer's mind to talk to Castiel, but he refuses to expel Lucifer until the battle is over. Lucifer (Mark Pellegrino) arrives and attacks Crowley. Sam exorcises Castiel's body which frees Crowley. Rowena and Crowley then escape as Amara arrives. Amara confronts Lucifer and he tries to attack her with the Horn but fails. Amara then takes Lucifer with her.

Sam and Dean then discuss their next move with Lucifer, theorizing that since Lucifer had fallen he couldn't use a Hand of God's full power. Amara decides to torture Lucifer as a way to torment God and the episode ends as she uses her powers to torture Lucifer, who screams in agony.

== Reception ==
=== Viewers ===
The episode was watched by 1.75 million viewers with a 0.7/3 share among adults aged 18 to 49. This was a 20% increase in viewership from the previous episode, which was watched by 1.45 million viewers. This means that 0.7 percent of all households with televisions watched the episode, while 3 percent of all households watching television at that time watched it. Supernatural ranked as the second most watched program on The CW in the day, behind Arrow.

=== Critical reviews ===
Professional ratings
Review scores
Source	Rating
IGN	8.2
TV Fanatic	3.9/5 stars
TV Overmind	5/5 stars
Den of Geek	4/5 stars

"Hell's Angel" received positive reviews. Matt Fowler of IGN gave the episode a "great" 8.2 out of 10 and wrote in his verdict, "Seemingly, 'Hell's Angel' was going to be all about getting Cas back. With perhaps a little Darkness smiting on the side. Well, neither one happened and Amara took off with Casifer (deciding to use him to draw out God - a nice tease). So while there were certainly dangers and witticisms to spare, the end result was kind of hollow. We knew this wasn't the season finale, but there were parts of it that also felt like a waste of the cast."

Hunter Bishop of TV Overmind gave the series a perfect star rating of 5 out of 5, writing "I've watched this episode three times, and each time I'm as buzzed as I was before. We're dealing with some serious power here, and that doesn't even count Rowena, who's back in the fold. She'll end up playing an integral role, I'm sure of it; she's got powerful enough magics to heal Amara, and that might come in handy later on. This season of Supernatural has been such a revival from the up-and-downs of the past. I can't wait to see how it all comes to an end." Caitlin Kelly of Hypable wrote, "Perhaps what feels so off about this episode for me, however, is how little it is about the Winchesters. This episode felt like it could have happened even if the brothers weren't present, and that's not how you should feel about your main characters. The standalone episodes this season have been excellent, but the mytharc is definitely lacking."

Samantha Highfill of EW stated: "Just as Supernatural does every year, this season has one overarching story line that is planted firmly in the beginning, sprinkled throughout most episodes, and then will finish things out (usually with a bang). And after taking a few weeks off from the Darkness and Lucifer and of it all, this episode saw a major return to the building battle. And, man, have I missed both Crowley and Cassifer."

Sean McKenna from TV Fanatic, gave a 3.9 star rating out of 5, stating: "Will God appear on Supernatural? It's a question I'm sure many viewers have continued to ask, especially with what seems like the numerous mentions of the character on Supernatural Season 11. And with the way Supernatural Season 11 Episode 18 ended, it certainly feels more likely... right? On one hand, it just seems like the right time with God's sister showing up and causing problems that God would finally reveal himself and get involved. Granted, we've seen lots of bad things happen on Earth over the seasons from the apocalypse to the Leviathan arriving, etc., and we haven't heard a peep from him. So, would Amara using Lucifer to draw out God really work? That's what's going to get him to reveal himself? The idea sounds exciting, but I also worry that the execution of him arriving might be more of a letdown."

Bridget LaMonica from Den of Geek, gave a 4 star rating out of 5, stating: ""I wish there had been more time to expand upon the Castiel/Lucifer/Crowley trifecta inside the same vessel. That could have been an episode in itself. I feel a missed opportunity. Imagine the bickering. The battle of titans. The hilarious moments of Crowley desperately trying to get Castiel to stop watching re-runs and contribute to the fight."

MaryAnn Sleasman of TV.com wrote, "'Hell's Angel' positioned Supernatural for the Season 11 homestretch, proving to Sam and Dean once and for all that Lucifer won't be the key to their victory over Amara and cementing their dedication to saving Castiel from that meatsuit life. Heaven’s in shambles and hell probably isn't much better. Rowena's alive but who knows for how long this time, and my fluttering fangirl heart can't take any more dead-Crowley-fake-outs this season. I'm probably forgetting something. That's what happens when you cram half a season's worth of exposition into a single mess of an episode."
