= Our Little World =

- Supernatural episode
- Episode no.: Season 11; Episode 6
- Directed by: John F. Showalter
- Written by: Robert Berens
- Cinematography by: Serge Ladouceur
- Editing by: James Pickel
- Production code: 4X6256
- Original air date: November 11, 2015
- Running time: 42 minutes

Guest appearances
- Curtis Armstrong as Metatron

Episode chronology
← Previous "Thin Lizzie"	Next → "Plush"
- Supernatural season 11

"Our Little World" is the 6th episode of the paranormal drama television series Supernatural's season 11, and the 224th overall. The episode was written by executive story editor Robert Berens and directed by John Showalter. It was first broadcast on November 11, 2015, on The CW. In the episode, Sam, Dean and Castiel begin looking for Metatron as he may have the key to the answers of The Darkness while Crowley loses control of Amara.

The episode received positive reviews, with critics praising the new character development and God's revelation.

== Plot ==
Amara eats a girl's soul and then returns to Crowley's (Mark A. Sheppard) lair. He chastises her for sneaking and risking herself and uses his powers to lock her in her room. After the Lizzie's murders, Sam (Jared Padalecki) and Dean (Jensen Ackles) discover that Len has been killed by one of Crowley's demons and discover he is holding Amara.

Castiel (Misha Collins) spends his time watching daytime talk shows but during a news report, discovers that the cameraman is Metatron (Curtis Armstrong). He locates Metatron, who is stuck as a human and films tragedies to sell to the media for money. Sensing a rage within Castiel, Metatron constantly mocks him, hoping to be killed since he hates being human. Finally, Castiel makes Metatron reveal something: in order to create humanity, God had to sacrifice his only kin: the Darkness, His sister.

Sam and Dean discover that Crowley holds Amara on an asylum and track it down. Sam goes after the demons and Dean arrives at Amara's room. Dean plans on killing her but Crowley arrives and uses his powers to hurt Dean. Amara is now revealed to be even more powerful than Crowley and hurts him, sparing his life and breaking their connection. Amara knows Dean won't kill her because of their link and says she'll soon be strong enough to exact her revenge on God and disappears.

In the bunker, Castiel tells Sam and Dean that he spared Metatron's life as he is no longer a threat. Just then, Sam receives a vision of Lucifer's Cage when he was the prisoner along with Lucifer and Michael. The episode ends as Amara walks through the street, finally freed.

== Reception ==
=== Viewers ===
The episode was watched by 1.70 million viewers with a 0.7/2 share among adults aged 18 to 49. This was a 20% decrease in viewership from the previous episode, which was watched by 1.64 million viewers. 0.7 percent of all households with televisions watched the episode, while 2 percent of all households watching television at that time watched it. Supernatural ranked as the second most watched program on The CW in the day, behind Arrow.

=== Critical reviews ===
Professional ratings
Review scores
Source	Rating
IGN	8.7
TV Fanatic	4.5/5
Den of Geek	5/5 stars

"Our Little World" received positive reviews from critics. Amy Ratcliffe of IGN gave the episode a "great" 8.7 out of 10 and wrote in her verdict, "Supernatural isn't wasting any time. Cas found Metatron and got answers in a single episode, and the Winchesters went right to Amara and Crowley. The pace is adding an urgency to the story. And bonuses: we learned how Amara ties into the big picture and got a look at the cage. In short, things are happening and Supernatural is more exciting than it's been in a little while."

Hunter Bishop of TV Overmind wrote, "The directing and music choices this season on Supernatural have been fantastic; whoever chose the static-like sound that was all over this episode really outdid themselves, because that fit perfectly. The directing feels so much more daring and interesting and exciting than in the past; before, it seemed like it was pretty simple, straightforward work was being done. I'm not putting that down, or at least I don't mean to, but this year feels so much different. Perhaps I'm just enjoying the story and the like so much I am being more charitable, but I don't think so. Something is different this year about Supernatural, and I can't quite put my finger on it."

Samantha Highfill of EW stated: "Supernatural is excellent at the big, gasp-worthy twist. But the show also uses it sparingly. Last year, it was the reveal that there was such a thing called the Darkness, which God battled long before He created the world. And in tonight's episode, we got the second part of that twist, which might be even more gasp-worthy than the first: The Darkness is God's sister!!! I love the way this show puts its spin on things, and this is the perfect example of that. It takes the age-old story of creation and flips it upside down: In order to create the world, God had to betray and sacrifice his only kin — his sister. I didn't think it was possible for me to get more excited about this story line, but suddenly, I am."

Sean McKenna from TV Fanatic, gave a 4.5 star rating out of 5, stating: "Either way, Sam, Dean and Castiel are really going to need to band together and get some info on how to take down the Darkness. She's now on her own, hungry as ever, and getting more independent, knowledgeable, powerful, and more determined to settle a score with God. So let's just hope that we get some solid payoff regarding that by the end. This was such a pleasant surprise of an episode. From the sister surprise to the cage, 'Our Little World' really opened up the doors to some exciting and new possibilities, continuing to build up what's been a strong Supernatural Season 11 so far."

MaryAnn Sleasman of TV.com wrote, "'Our Small World' started slow, but quickly picked up speed as the Winchesters collided with Crowley, Amara, and a big old dose of TRUTH. Amara, it turns out, is God's sister because like Supernatural fan fiction, bible fan fiction is also full of random mysterious powerful long-lost-sister self-inserts. This revelation does open up some interesting questions though—so like, Amara is Castiel's aunt then, right? Awwwwwkward."

Bridget LaMonica of Den of Geek gave the episode a perfect 5 star rating out of 5 and wrote, "The writers really play up the symbiotic relationship between the King of Hell and Amara, likening it to a parent with an unruly child. Crowley's even reading a book on parental advice, 'Understanding Your Rebellious Teen,' while he's supposed to be paying attention at a demonic business meeting. Amara sneaks in after an outing consuming a soul and walks in on bare feet, holding her shoes, like a teenager who snuck out for a party. Very funny imagery, and the lightheartedness helped in these scenes to expand upon Crowley's interest in raising his adopted kid."
