= Baby (Supernatural) =

- Supernatural episode
- Episode no.: Season 11; Episode 4
- Directed by: Thomas J. Wright
- Written by: Robbie Thompson
- Cinematography by: Serge Ladouceur
- Editing by: Donald L. Koch; Bruce E. Gorman
- Production code: 4X6254
- Original air date: October 28, 2015
- Running time: 42 minutes

Episode chronology
← Previous "The Bad Seed"	Next → "Thin Lizzie"
- Supernatural season 11

"Baby" is the 4th episode of the paranormal drama television series Supernatural's season 11, and the 222nd overall. The episode was written by co-executive producer Robbie Thompson and directed by Thomas J. Wright. It was first broadcast on October 28, 2015 on The CW. Shown entirely from within the Impala, the bottle episode follows Sam and Dean as they travel across America to hunt a previously undocumented species of monster.

The most-watched episode of the season, "Baby" received universal acclaim from fans and critics, several of whom named it one of the best in the entire series. The angles from which the episode was shot received significant attention, as it was filmed much differently than other episodes due to the entire story being shown from the perspective of Dean's Impala, the eponymous "Baby".

== Plot ==
As Sam (Jared Padalecki) and Dean (Jensen Ackles) wash Dean's Impala, the brothers discuss their lack of success in finding the Darkness. Sam proposes taking a case in Quaker Valley, Oregon, where a local sheriff was found mauled in the woods. Believing it might be a werewolf attack, and wanting to get out on the road again, they decide to investigate despite a lack of solid evidence. On the road to Oregon, Castiel (Misha Collins) calls, telling Sam and Dean that he can't find any information on the case. Trying to help him recover from his experience in the previous episode, Sam and Dean insist that he rest, with Sam offering Castiel his room and Netflix to keep him occupied.

Despite Sam's objections, Dean pulls over to a roadhouse that he had an affair at several years ago. Telling Dean to have fun without him, Sam says that he is going to do more research on the case. In the morning, Dean discovers Sam with a girl, Piper, in the car, who departs after an awkward meeting. As she leaves, she accidentally drops her hairpin in the backseat. Teasing Sam about his one-night stand, Dean puts on Bob Seger's "Night Moves" as the brothers drive away from the roadhouse. Later, the two discuss their opinions about settling down; Dean says that one-night stands are all that hunters can ever have, while Sam still thinks that they might be able to achieve something more meaningful. Sam falls asleep in the backseat of the car, and seemingly awakens to the sight of a younger version of his father, John Winchester, sitting in the driver's seat. John tells Sam that he is there to deliver a message: that the Darkness is coming and that they are the only people that can stop it. Sam tells John that he needs to provide some clue as to how to stop the Darkness, but John merely states that "God helps those who help themselves." Sensing that John is not who he says, Sam asks who he really is, but before he can answer, Sam is woken by Dean. Sam tells Dean about his vision, but Dean merely dismisses it as a dream, telling him that he also frequently dreams about their father. Sam remains unconvinced, believing that it may be a message from God.

When Sam and Dean finally reach their location, they discover the corpse of the sheriff to be mauled and his heart missing. Dean coins the term "were-pire" to describe the creature that attacked the sheriff, while Sam gets a copy of the report from the sheriff's replacement, Deputy Donnelly. Donnelly recommends a restaurant to the brothers, who decide to check it out. When they get there, they discover that it is valet-parking only, and Dean is reluctant to surrender the car to the valet, Jessie. Jessie takes the car apparently to be parked, but leaves the restaurant and cruises in the Impala with her friend, who leaves her purse in the car. When she returns to the restaurant, Dean, oblivious to her adventure, grudgingly praises her for taking good care of the car. Dean takes Sam to the sheriff's office to ask if his wife had seen anything suspicious, while Dean returns to the area where the body was found, feeling something is not right with the crime scene photos. Dean is contacted by Castiel who tells him that the creature that attacked the sheriff might be a Whisper, and the only way to kill it is to shoot him with silver bullets or beheading. After Dean tells Castiel that he has discovered that the crime scene was staged, deputy sheriff Donnelly stops by and, after apparently friendly chat, attacks Dean. As Castiel explains the lore behind Whispers, Dean and the deputy fight around and on top of the Impala, until Dean decapitates him. Finding the sheriff's head to still be alive, Dean puts it in the freezer in the backseat and send a picture to Castiel for further research. Dean calls Sam, who says that he got jumped and managed to escape, taking the unconscious Mrs. Markham with him. As Dean goes to pick him up, he drops the machete that he used to decapitate the sheriff under the front seat.

Castiel calls back to inform them that the creature is a Nachzehrer, a ghoul/vampire-like creature. The only way to kill is by placing a Charon's Obul (a coin in ancient Greek mythology) or a copper coin in its mouth, to serve as currency to take it to the Underworld, and sever its head. He also adds that if they kill the alpha, the rest of the pack will return to being human. Sam and Dean realize that they need to find pennies minted pre-1982, as after that they were no longer made of copper. Sam goes to a market to get change, while in the backseat Mrs. Markham regains consciousness. Revealed to be a Nachzehrer, and that she killed her husband, she knocks Dean unconscious and drives off with him, abandoning Sam. She drives to the body of the deputy sheriff Donnelly and reunites him with his head, and he drives off with Dean and Mrs. Markham in the car.

When Dean regains consciousness, Donnelly tells him that he is building an army to fight the Darkness, who will kill everyone unless stopped. Dean finds Piper's hairpin and unlocks his handcuffs, and grabs the alpha, causing the car to smash into a roadblock. He finds Jessie's friend's purse in the car, which has pennies in it, places a coin in the alpha's mouth. Using the machete he dropped earlier and the door of the Impala, he decapitates the alpha and cures all of the transformed Nachzehrers. With Mrs. Markham's humanity restored, she asks Dean to help her find her children, to which he obliges, figuring Sam is somewhere nearby. Returning to the former Nachzehrer nest, where all of the creatures have returned to human form, Dean picks Sam up in the car as they discuss the impact the Darkness is having on monsters as well as humans. Agreeing to stop the Darkness, Dean tells Sam that they need to go home, to which Sam replies, "We are home," affectionately patting the Impala. As the brothers drive back to the bunker, "Night Moves" once again comes on the radio as the screen fades to black.

== Reception ==
=== Viewers ===
The episode was watched by 2.04 million viewers with a 0.8/2 share among adults aged 18 to 49. This was a 28% increase in viewership from the previous episode, which was watched by 1.59 million viewers. 0.8 percent of all households with televisions watched the episode, while 2 percent of all households watching television at that time watched it. Supernatural ranked as the second most watched program on The CW in the day, behind Arrow.

=== Critical reviews ===
Professional ratings
Review scores
Source	Rating
IGN	9.8
TV Fanatic	4.9/5
Den of Geek	4/5 stars

"Baby" received overwhelmingly positive reviews from fans and critics, with many praising the episode's unique cinematography. Amy Ratcliffe of IGN gave the episode an "amazing" 9.8 out of 10 and wrote in her verdict, "Supernatural's gone and done it. They've made one of their best episodes ever in Season 11. So far, this season has been quite good, but 'Baby' surpassed all expectations. The concept was fresh and really added a new personal layer to how we see the Winchesters. The Impala is such a part of the family that it was weirdly comforting and emotional to know how it views the boys' adventures."

Hunter Bishop of TV Overmind wrote, "The biggest strength of tonight's episode was that it stripped away the typical TV fare. The camera shots were limited to just inside the car, and they were almost exclusively stationary. The music was gone, too; only the radio and ambient noise made up the soundtrack, something that probably hasn’t happened before, or at least not often. When we see it from the car, we literally see it from the car: unabridged, unvarnished, and unpolished. The brothers share their feelings, often awkwardly. They laugh at each other, reaching across the fear that is always pumping through their veins. Sometimes, they even listen to music. The combat scenes tonight were as good as they've ever been. They were raw, and brutal, and without musical cue. This was a Supernatural that felt like it was on HBO, or at least FX. It felt free of what we expect of The CW and the campiness from all too often this show relies on. It felt like a different television show, almost like an alternate universe, where the visceral, gut-wrenching horror of the first two seasons stuck around, and softened gradually, instead of slipping away in the middle of the night."

Samantha Highfill of EW stated: "Supernatural fans know the importance of Dean's Impala, and they also know the show's history of taking unorthodox ideas and somehow making them work within the show's universe, whether it be 'Changing Channels,' 'The French Mistake,' 'Fan Fiction,' or any number of episodes. But what we didn't know until tonight was how well those two things would go together. There are very few shows on television that can have as much fun with format as Supernatural, and tonight was another example — one of the best, in my opinion — of the great storytelling that can come out of such rule-bending. I mean, seriously, how good was this episode?"

Sean McKenna from TV Fanatic, gave a 4.9 star rating out of 5, stating: "Sure, keeping the camera in the Impala was an unconventional approach, but the end result was a positive. The Impala is its own character after all. Ultimately, this was an episode that truly captured the spirit of Supernatural, and I'm glad we got to take this worthwhile trip with the Winchesters and their trusty 'Baby'."

MaryAnn Sleasman of TV.com wrote, "It's been drilled into our heads for 11 seasons now that everything is terrible and tragic and this always ends 'bloody or sad.' Sometimes watching Supernatural is an exercise in emotional masochism... and sometimes we get gems like 'Baby,' that give Sam and Dean their humanity back, if only for an hour. They've broken the world more times than we like to admit — and put it back together again just as often — but they're also dumb boys from Kansas who drink beer and bang waitresses, prank each other and sing in the car. This is the stuff that makes up their lives. This is who Dean and Sam are when heaven and hell aren't toying with them. Our impressions of who Dean and Sam are, how they feel, and what they do in their free time is all based on a very narrow view of their day-to-day lives. "Baby" filled in those gaps between crises."

Becky Lea of Den of Geek gave the episode a 4 star rating out of 5 and wrote, "The other bit of dialogue I said BS on was Dean calling Sam a nerd for knowing saying how only pre-1982 coins are copper. Dean, having surprised the entire freaking world by knowing that “God helps those who help themselves” came from the time of Aesop's Fables, shouldn't be so judgy. Also — the fact that Dean didn't murder valet girl for daring to take a joy ride in the Impala just felt plain wrong. Valet girl's joyride was completely useless except for getting me mad at fictional girls, not that it matters if the girls scratched it. By the end of the episode the Impala is blood stained, missing a window, and sporting a ruined front end. But she still starts up, faithful as always." Lisa Macklem of SpoilerTV wrote, "Again, this entire episode was like comfort food. Some wonderful brother moments, a decent monster-of-the-week hunt, but with a mytharc tie-in, and some great echos of episodes past."
