= Form and Void =

Form and Void may refer to:

- Form and Void (Supernatural), an episode of the American paranormal drama television series Supernatural
- Form and Void (True Detective), an episode of the American anthology crime drama television series True Detective
- Form & Void (comics), a collection of Dave Sim's Cerebus comic book series
