= Hells Angels (disambiguation) =

Hells Angels is a motorcycle club.

Hells Angels or Hell's Angels may also refer to:

== Films ==
- Hell's Angels (film), a 1930 epic film about World War I combat pilots directed by Howard Hughes
- Hell's Angel (TV programme), a 1994 BBC television documentary about Mother Teresa by Christopher Hitchens
- Hell's Angel (Supernatural), an episode of the television series Supernatural

== Music ==
- "Hell's Angel", sketch-song by Chevy Chase from National Lampoon Lemmings, 1973
- "Hells Angels", by Roy Harper from Flat Baroque and Berserk, 1970

== In print ==
- Hells Angels (manga), a Japanese manga series (2002–2004)
- Dark Angel (Marvel Comics), a comic book published by Marvel Comics in the 1990s, originally called Hell's Angel
- Hell's Angels (book), a 1967 book by Hunter S. Thompson

== Military ==
- Hell's Angels (aircraft), the first B-17 to reach 25 combat missions over Europe in WW2
- "Hell's Angels", nickname of the 3rd Squadron of the Flying Tigers in World War II
- "Hell's Angels", nickname for the 303rd Bombardment Group unit of the United States Air Force

== Other uses ==
- The Hell's Angels, a professional wrestling tag team in the UK in the 1960s, consisting of Adrian Street and Bobby Barnes
- Zabaniyah, angels that torment sinners in hell, according to Islam.
