= O Brother, Where Art Thou? (disambiguation) =

O Brother, Where Art Thou? or variants may refer to:

- O Brother, Where Art Thou?, 2000 film written, produced, co-edited and directed by Joel and Ethan Coen
  - O Brother, Where Art Thou? (soundtrack), soundtrack of the film
- "Oh Brother, Where Art Thou?", 1991 episode of the television series The Simpsons
- "O Brother, Where Bart Thou?", 2009 episode of the television series The Simpsons
- "O Brother, Where Art Thou?" (Supergirl), episode of the television series Supergirl
- O Brother Where Art Thou? (Supernatural), an episode of the television series Supernatural
