= Thin Lizzie (Supernatural) =

- Supernatural episode
- Episode no.: Season 11; Episode 5
- Directed by: Rashaad Ernesto Green
- Written by: Nancy Won
- Cinematography by: Serge Ladouceur
- Editing by: Nicole Baer
- Production code: 4X6255
- Original air date: November 4, 2015
- Running time: 42 minutes

Guest appearances
- Jared Gertner as Len; Tess Atkins as Sydney; Yasmeene Ball as Teenage Amara; Claude Knowlton as Detective Madsen; Tracey Power as Dawn Pinsky; Finn Wolfhard as Jordie Pinsky

Episode chronology
← Previous "Baby"	Next → "Our Little World"
- Supernatural season 11

"Thin Lizzie" is the 5th episode of the paranormal drama television series Supernatural's season 11, and the 223rd overall. The episode was written by consulting producer Nancy Won and directed by Rashaad Ernesto Green. It was first broadcast on November 4, 2015 on The CW. In the episode, Sam and Dean Winchester investigate murders that were associated with Lizzie Borden.

The episode received positive reviews, with critics praising the new continuity between episodes.

== Plot ==
A young couple is killed in a hotel that used to be the home of Lizzie Borden. Sam and Dean quickly find all the paranormal signs in the hotel are fakes for the tourists. However, one of the hotel owners is killed, along with a man a few miles away from the hotel whose murder was actually witnessed by Sydney, the babysitter of his son Jordie. Sam becomes suspicious when Dawn, the victim's wife and Jordie's mother, has an unemotional reaction to her husband's death.

Dean meets Len (Jared Gertner) a Lizzie Borden fan who says he saw a girl named Amara wandering outside the hotel a few nights ago and he hasn't felt normal since he met her. Dean realizes Amara ate Len's soul. Suspecting Dawn to be soulless as well, the Winchesters track her down and find her and her lover dead in a house with Jordie tied up. Sydney captures the Winchesters explaining she also met Amara, who said she wanted to help Sydney. Sydney has felt blissful ever since her soul was taken, Amara helping her not care about her abusive childhood.

Sydney killed her enemies and Jordie's parents for being abusive and plans to offer the Winchesters to Amara as a gift. Len saves the Winchesters by killing Sydney. Len can feel himself turning darker the longer he is without a soul so he turns himself in for all the murders to stop himself. The Winchesters send Jordie to an aunt and are concerned about Amara growing stronger. Amara watches them as they leave promising to see Dean soon.

== Reception ==
=== Viewers ===
The episode was watched by 1.64 million viewers with a 0.6/2 share among adults aged 18 to 49. This was a 20% decrease in viewership from the previous episode, which was watched by 2.04 million viewers. 0.6 percent of all households with televisions watched the episode, while 2 percent of all households watching television at that time watched it. Supernatural ranked as the second most watched program on The CW in the day, behind Arrow.

=== Critical reviews ===
Professional ratings
Review scores
Source	Rating
IGN	8.1
TV Fanatic	4.3/5

"Thin Lizzie" received positive reviews from critics. Amy Ratcliffe of IGN gave the episode a "great" 8.1 out of 10 and wrote in her verdict, "'Thin Lizzie' showed another take on a soulless person and also showed how being soulless can bring peace to someone. It was a good lesson for the Winchesters and cool to see from an audience perspective. Aside from fleshing that out, the episode was entertaining -- the Lizzie Borden red herring was a smart touch – but the Darkness didn't come across as very threatening in her current incarnation."

Hunter Bishop of TV Overmind wrote, "While this episode of Supernatural wasn't as dynamic as last week's all-time great hour, this was still one of the better episodes of a really good season. There hasn't been a bad episode so far, and I think that, a fourth of the way of the season through, that we can reasonable expect that this could continue. The writing has been better, the directing has been superb, and the music choices have been fantastic. I think we're building to something great, and I am really, really excited to see how the rest of Supernatural Season 11 goes."

Samantha Highfill of EW stated: "There are many different types of Supernatural episodes. Last week was an example of a more innovative, format-bending hour. But this week was another Supernatural essential: The classic case of the week (that beautifully ties into the greater story arc). Here's how these seem to go: There's a murder. Sam and Dean get on the case. Sam and Dean hit a bump... until there's a second murder. Then and only then do they really get involved. Then they usually find themselves in a highly dangerous situation — oftentimes tied up — and they come out victorious. It might sound like it gets boring, but when done well, it really doesn't. And this show does it well."

Sean McKenna from TV Fanatic, gave a 4.3 star rating out of 5, stating: "That said, putting Sam and Dean at the core focus of the hour felt like some old school Supernatural. And I love that they are trying to keep on their new rules path, too. This was an entertaining episode that found a solid way to put the brothers on the trail of their monster of the week while incorporating the bigger story. It's good to see Supernatural Season 11 off to such a positive start."

MaryAnn Sleasman of TV.com wrote, "Episodes like 'Baby' and 'Thin Lizzie' are not a complete return to original form for Supernatural because that move would be a disservice to the series as well; Hell, Purgatory, the cage, all manner of possession, betrayal and loss — it can't be ignored, but as we enter what is certainly edging on twilight for our little undead show, we also can't ignore just how unsustainable the endless suffering is. Sam and Dean can't return to the young men they once were, but they can at least try to channel aspects of those boys in their current lives and the fact that, despite some iffy moments, that storyline wasn't dropped as soon as the premiere ended is a pretty good indicator of how this series has survived for so long."

Becky Lea of Den of Geek wrote, "The wider season arc is developing nicely, especially the focus on how the Darkness is affecting the world as we know it, both actively and indirectly. Although I personally would have preferred a singular episode, using a seemingly straightforward case to illustrate what Amara is up to and clue the boys in on to how she is developing is a streamlined way of advancing that narrative arc. Sam and Dean are now as up to speed as Crowley and it gives the show a template to move forward with as they 'follow the bodies' to catch up with the speedily growing Amara. 'Thin Lizzie' is a bit of a mixed episode then, but there's still some entertaining stuff in there. I think I was perhaps a little spoiled by how good Baby was. Next week sees Castiel contact Metatron for help with the Darkness so we're back in deep season Big Bad territory."
