= Form and Void (Supernatural) =

- Supernatural episode
- Episode no.: Season 11; Episode 2
- Directed by: Phil Sgriccia
- Written by: Andrew Dabb
- Cinematography by: Serge Ladouceur
- Editing by: James Pickel
- Production code: 4X6253
- Original air date: October 14, 2015
- Running time: 42 minutes

Guest appearances
- Laci J. Mailey as Deputy Jenna Nickerson; Lee Majdoub as Hannah; Gracyn Shinyei as Young Amara/The Darkness; Christine Willes as Jenna's Grandmother; Lisa Berry as Billie

Episode chronology
← Previous "Out of the Darkness, Into the Fire"	Next → "The Bad Seed"
- Supernatural season 11

"Form and Void" is the 2nd episode of the paranormal drama television series Supernatural's season 11, and the 220th overall. The episode was written by co-executive producer Andrew Dabb and directed by executive producer Phil Sgriccia. It was first broadcast on October 14, 2015 on The CW. In the episode, Dean takes Jenna to her grandmother's house with the baby Amara, unaware that she is the Darkness, whom Crowley is looking for so he can use her power. Meanwhile, Sam works on a cure for the virus while Castiel is tortured by angels for Metatron's whereabouts.

The episode received critical acclaim, with critics praising Amara's new role as the antagonist.

== Plot ==
In Superior, Nebraska, Sam (Jared Padalecki) captures an infected man as a way to find a cure for the virus. Meanwhile, Dean (Jensen Ackles) takes Jenna (Laci J. Mailey) and the baby to Cedar Rapids, Iowa at her grandmother's (Christine Willes) house. When her grandmother puts her on her bed, Amara shows signs of telekinesis.

When they discover this, Jenna's religious grandmother decides to call a preacher as she believes she's possessed. Dean is called by Jenna and is surprised when he discovers the preacher is none other than Crowley (Mark A. Sheppard). While Jenna tends to Amara, Amara consumes her soul, making her killing her grandmother.

In the hospital, Sam is visited by Billie (Lisa Berry), a reaper. She explains that after the Death's death, the reapers decided to stop reviving Sam and Dean and instead of sending them to Heaven or Hell when they die, they will be tossed into "the empty", where no one returns. Sam decides to pray to God for help in finding the cure and begins to receive clues from his memories in Lucifer's Cage.

Sam's condition begins worsening and in a last attempt to find a cure, finds a passage in the bible about the holy oil. He pours holy oil over his black veins, healing them. He then attracts the infected people to a ring of fire surrounded by holy oil, curing them. Dean and Crowley find Amara in the crib and realizing she has the Mark of Cain, discovers she's the Darkness. They then find Jenna, who tries to kill Dean and Crowley is forced to kill her. Crowley intends to use Amara for his purposes and when Dean goes to check on the baby, Amara and Crowley are gone.

Meanwhile, Castiel (Misha Collins) is being tortured by the angels Efram and Jonah to reveal Metatron's whereabouts. He is finally rescued by Hannah, who's currently in a male vessel (Lee Majdoub). However, Castiel correctly deduces that Hannah set everything from his torture to his rescue so she could get information from him. When Efram and Jonah return with a plan to break into his brain, Castiel (still in the rabid dog spell) kills Efram and Jonah but Hannah is stabbed and killed after protesting that they went too far.

Sam and Dean return to the bunker where they discover an injured Castiel, asking for help. Meanwhile, Amara is now in the form of a young girl (Gracyn Shinyei). She's found by Crowley, who offers her people to feed.

== Reception ==
=== Viewers ===
The episode was watched by 1.85 million viewers with a 0.8/3 share among adults aged 18 to 49. This was a 12% decrease in viewership from the previous episode, which was watched by 1.94 million viewers. This means that 0.8 percent of all households with televisions watched the episode, while 3 percent of all households watching television at that time watched it. Supernatural ranked as the second most watched program on The CW in the day, behind Arrow.

=== Critical reviews ===
Professional ratings
Review scores
Source	Rating
IGN	8.7
TV Fanatic	4.2/5

"Form and Void" received universal acclaim. Amy Ratcliffe of IGN gave the episode a "great" 8.7 out of 10 and wrote in her verdict, "Tonight's Supernatural wasn't earth shattering, but it moved the needle in intelligent and engaging ways. The Amara/Darkness plot is chugging along and bringing about interesting developments for everyone but especially Crowley and Sam."

Hunter Bishop of TV Overmind, wrote, "I thoroughly enjoyed this episode of Supernatural, which is evident by the 1200 rambling words. There is a lot philosophically that I can't wait to explore. I especially can't wait to see more soulless stuff, and I would be very pleased to see a return of Soulless-Sam, which is the best work that Jared Padalecki has ever done. This season of Supernatural is off to a strong start. The first two episodes were very serialized, and I hope that continues. It probably won't, because they have a 23 episode order, and writing 23 serialized episodes would kill most writers (myself included). I just hope that in the episodes that are heavily serialized, we get something like we got tonight."

Sara Netzley of EW stated: "The Supernatural-verse got a little bigger in this week's episode, which picks up hours after the premiere. We have a new Reaper, more jerk angels (seriously, will Heaven ever run out of jerk angels), and a new final resting place for the Winchester boys after they die. Again."

Sean McKenna from TV Fanatic, gave a 4.2 star rating out of 5, stating: "If anything, I'm just glad that Sam and Dean reunited by the end. Sure, there are plenty of questions I'd love to have answered, hopefully in due time, and I'm a bit hesitant when it comes to the new big bad. But the overall direction of Supernatural Season 11 is intriguing, and I'm still looking forward to seeing the Winchester brothers tackle whatever obstacle they have to face."

MaryAnn Sleasman of TV.com wrote, "'Form and Void' picked up where 'Out of the Darkness, Into the Fire' left off and gave shape to the amorphous plot point that the Darkness and Amara presented. It also didn't waste anymore time tormenting Castiel at the hands of the prep-school angel boys, finally reuniting him with his precious, precious Winchesters. More Please."

Becky Lea of Den of Geek wrote, "Thankfully though, for now, both Winchesters are back together at the bunker, neither one of them harbouring anything particularly nasty waiting to erode their souls. What they do have is a weakened, cursed Castiel to deal with. The eleventh season is off to a characteristically strong start." Lisa Macklem of SpoilerTV wrote, "I thought this was a reasonably fun episode, with good effects – baby Amara morphing into slightly older Amara was also super creepy! Lots of good one liners and some interesting things like that vision and Billie thrown into the mix. What did you think of the episode? Did you have a favorite line? Do you think Amara has a more sinister purpose than simply eating souls? Any more theories about her connection to Dean? Is Chuck out there?!"
