= Emily Swallow =

American actress (born 1979)

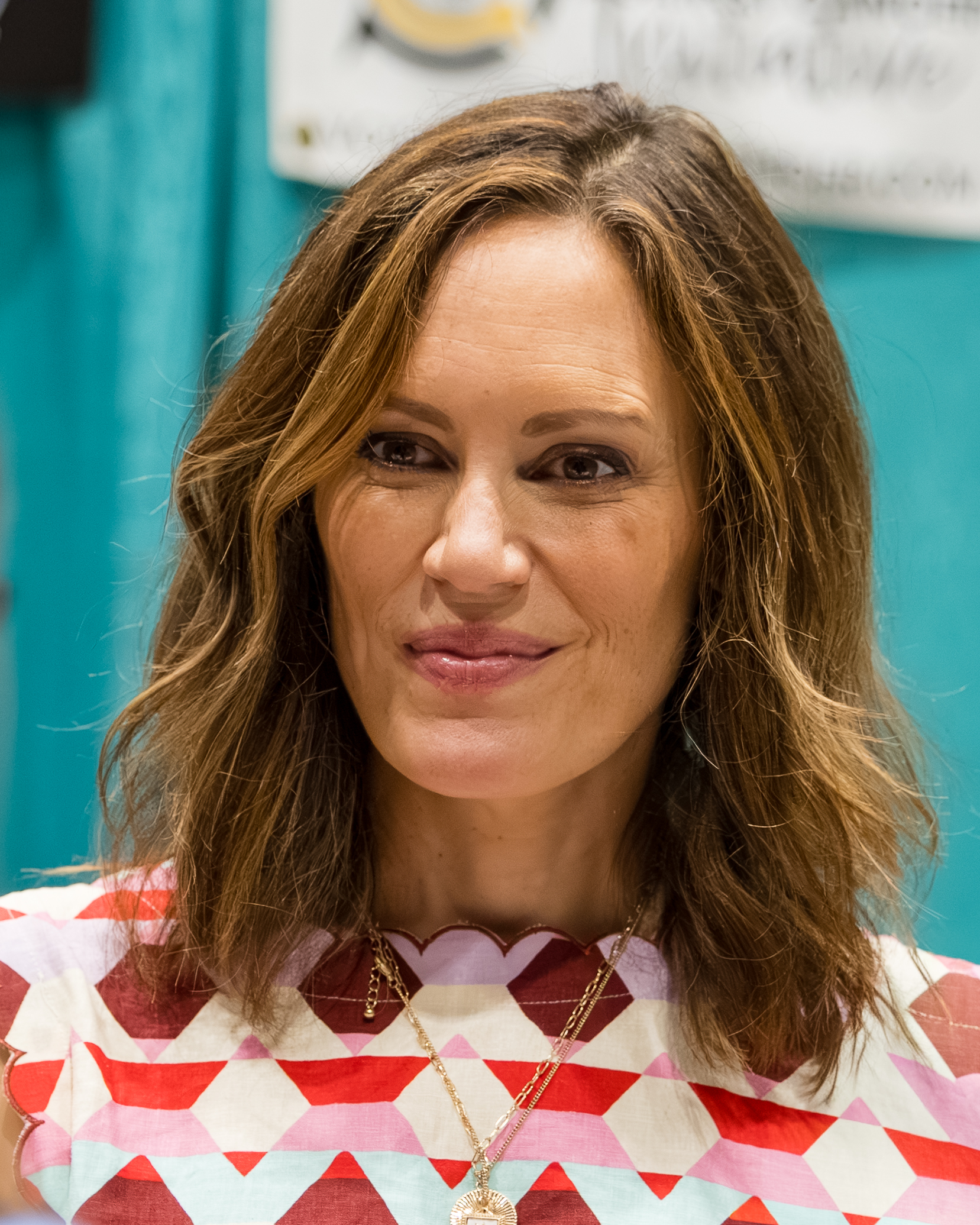
- Swallow at GalaxyCon Oklahoma City in 2026
- Born: December 18, 1979 (age 46); Washington, D.C., U.S.
- Education: University of Virginia (BA); New York University (MFA)
- Occupation: Actress
- Years active: 2006–present
- Spouse: Chad Kimball (m. 2018)
- Website: www.officialemilyswallow.com

Emily Swallow (born December 18, 1979) is an American actress. She is best known for her role as The Armorer in the Star Wars series The Mandalorian (2019–present) and The Book of Boba Fett (2022). She is also known for her roles as Kim Fischer in The Mentalist (2013–2014), Amara / The Darkness in Supernatural (2015–2020), Lisa Țepeș in Castlevania (2017–2021), and Puck in Pac-Man: Circle (2024). She also had a minor role as Emily in the video game The Last of Us Part II.

== Early life ==
Swallow was born on December 18, 1979, in Washington, D.C. She grew up in Sterling, Virginia and Jacksonville, Florida. While at Stanton College Preparatory School in Jacksonville, she began acting in various college, amateur, and professional theatre productions. She graduated in 2001 with a BA in Middle Eastern Studies from the University of Virginia and then studied for an MFA in Acting from New York University’s Tisch School of the Arts.

== Career ==
Swallow started her career in theatre, where she performed in various productions, including the Broadway musical High Fidelity, King Lear, The Taming of the Shrew, A Midsummer Night's Dream, Cat on a Hot Tin Roof at the Guthrie Theater, Much Ado About Nothing for Shakespeare in the Park, and the world-premiere of off-Broadway shows Romantic Poetry and Measure for Pleasure.

In 2008, Swallow made her film debut in the military drama The Lucky Ones. She starred in world premieres of Donald Margulies' play The Country House at Los Angeles' Geffen Playhouse, opposite Mark Rylance in Louis Jenkins' play Nice Fish at the Guthrie Theatre, and in John Patrick Shanley's musical Romantic Poetry at Manhattan Theater Club. She won the Falstaff Award for best Female Performer in 2010 for her performance as Kate in The Taming of the Shrew.

In 2012, Swallow and fellow singer/comedian Jac Huberman created a stage show called Jac N Swallow, which they performed in New York at the Laurie Beeckman Theater and Joe's Pub. The show centers on the comic misadventures of the duo as they navigate very different life challenges with varying degrees of sanity and dignity. In 2013 she collaborated with Mark Rylance and poet Louis Jenkins on the world premiere of Nice Fish at the Guthrie Theater. In 2016 she was cast in the Center Theatre Group's production of Ayad Akhtar's Disgraced.

Swallow's first television role was in Guiding Light, and she later played parts in Southland, Ringer, The Good Wife, NCIS, Flight of the Conchords, Medium, as series regular Dr. Michelle Robidaux on TNT's medical drama Monday Mornings and Rizzoli & Isles. She had a starring role in The Mentalist as FBI agent Kim Fischer. In 2015 she was cast in the eleventh season of Supernatural as the new character Amara, "the Darkness".

Starting in 2019 she took on the role of Armorer in the Star Wars series The Mandalorian as the leader of the traditionalist Mandalorians. Her face has not been seen in the series as the traditionalist characters never remove their helmets in view of others. Her character got greater prominence in the third season as it focused more on the Mandalorian people and not just the titular character, Din Djarin.

== Personal life ==
Swallow married actor Chad Kimball on August 26, 2018.

== Filmography ==
=== Film ===
Year	Title	Role	Notes
2008	The Lucky Ones	Brandi	
2018	Forget Me Not	Mother	Short film
2020	Haunting of the Mary Celeste	Rachel	

=== Television ===
Year	Title	Role	Notes
2006	Guiding Light	Regina	Episode: "12 June 2006"
2007	Jericho	Nurse	Episode: "Why We Fight"
2007	Flight of the Conchords	Becky	Episode: "What Goes on Tour?"
2007	Journeyman	Security Chief	Episode: "The Hanged Man"
2009–2010	Southland	Dina Clarke	5 episodes
2009	Medium	Erica Duvall	Episode: "New Terrain"
2009	NCIS	Darlene Kelp	Episode: "Child's Play"
2010	The Odds	Becca Facelli	TV movie
2011	The Good Wife	Mandy Cox	Episode: "The Death Zone"
2011	Ringer	Detective Elizabeth Saldana	3 episodes
2013	Ironside	Tabitha Gates	Episode: "Hell on Wheels"
2013	Monday Mornings	Dr. Michelle Robidaux	Main cast
2013	Rizzoli & Isles	Elizabeth Keating	Episode: "Build for Speed"
2013–2014	The Mentalist	Kim Fischer	Main cast (season 6)
2015	Girlfriends' Guide to Divorce	Carla	2 episodes
2015	Beauty & the Beast	Mrs. Zalman	Episode: "Heart of the Matter"
2015–2020	Supernatural	Amara / The Darkness	12 episodes
2016	How to Get Away with Murder	Lisa Cameron	3 episodes
2016	Adoptable	Lisa Crane / Lisa Fishman	Main cast
2017	Man with a Plan	Doctor Knox	Episode: "Doctor No"
2017–2021	Castlevania	Lisa Țepeș	Voice role, 4 episodes
2018	Timeless	Bathsheba Pope	Episode: "The Salem Witch Hunt"
2018	Dealbreakers	Maggie	Episode: "The Yogi"
2019	Bull	AUSA Audrey Valdez	Episode: "The Good One"
2019	Elementary	Bree Novacek	Episode: "From Russia with Drugs"
2019	Instinct	Allyson Randolph	Episode: "Grey Matter"
2019–2020	SEAL Team	Natalie Pierce	Recurring role (season 3)
2019–2023	The Mandalorian	The Armorer	Recurring role (seasons 1, 3); Nominated—Astra TV Award for Best Supporting Actress in a Streaming Series – Drama
2022	The Book of Boba Fett	The Armorer	Episode: "Chapter 5: Return of the Mandalorian"
2023	S.W.A.T.	Detective Ramona Quinn	Episode: "Witness"
2024	Secret Level	Puck	Voice role, episode: "PAC-MAN: Circle"

=== Video games ===
Year	Title	Role	Notes
2015	The Order: 1886	Additional Voices	
2020	The Last of Us Part II	Emily	
