= Ruth Connell =

Scottish actress and producer (born 1975)

- Connell in 2025
- Born: 20 April 1979 (age 47); Falkirk, Scotland
- Citizenship: United States
- Education: Rose Bruford College
- Occupations: Actress, producer
- Years active: 1998–present
- Partner: Rob Benedict
- Children: 1

Ruth Connell (born 20 April 1979) is a Scottish actress and producer. She is also a former professional dancer and choreographer. Connell is known for her recurring role as Rowena MacLeod in the CW series Supernatural (2014–2019). She was nominated as "Best Leading Actress" in the 2013 Broadway World Los Angeles Awards for her portrayal of Mrs Darling and Captain Hook at the Blank Theatre, Los Angeles in their award-winning production of Peter Pan: The Boy Who Hated Mothers.

== Early life ==
Born in Falkirk and raised outside Bonnybridge, she is the only child of football manager and coach David Connell and teacher Fiona Murray. Connell was sent to dancing lessons at an early age to keep her cousin company; she showed promise and was accepted onto the Scottish Ballets Vocational Dance Education Scheme. She performed many child roles with Scottish Ballet including the lead role of Clara in their Nutcracker. She won the titles of Scottish Junior Ballet Champion and Scottish Senior Ballet champion at Stage Festivals in Scotland as a teenager.

== Career ==
After working as a professional dancer with companies The Curve Foundation, Jazz Art UK, and with Leah Stein at Dancebase Edinburgh, Connell attended the Rose Bruford College of Speech and Drama in London where she gained a Bachelor of Arts degree in Acting. She was picked as the "Critics Choice" by the adjudicator from The Stage newspaper for her graduation showcase. After leaving drama college, she performed the lead role of Grusha in Bertolt Brecht's The Caucasian Chalk Circle, which toured for The Palace Theatre, Watford in 2004.

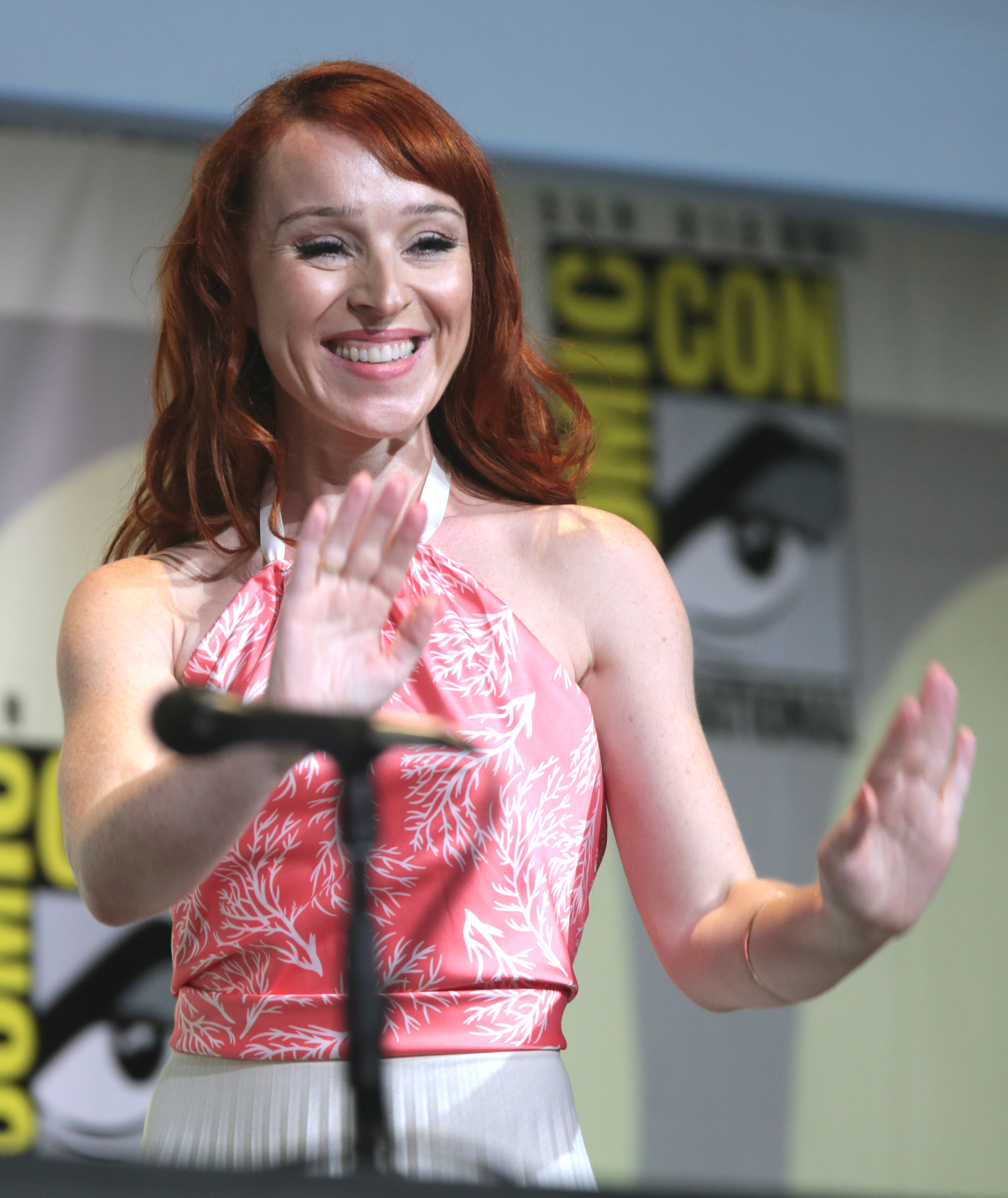
Connell at San Diego Comic Con 2016

Connell toured the UK in 2005 with the Oxford Stage Company's revival of Men Should Weep in the role of Isa. In 2006 she played the lead female roles of Gretchen and Helen of Troy in Faust at the Royal Lyceum Theatre, Edinburgh. The production was CATS-nominated Critics Awards for theatre in Scotland. In 2007 Connell played ballroom dancer Lily at the Citizens Theater's sell out production of Alex Norton's No Mean City and in 2008, Connell played the dual roles of Mrs. Beaver/Mrs. Mcready to glowing reviews The Lion, the Witch and the Wardrobe at The Royal Lyceum Edinburgh.

Connell was cast as a series regular in the BBC sitcom pilot Above Their Stations in 2009, which also starred Denis Lawson, Ashley Madekwe, Andrew Brooke and Simon Dudley shown on BBC Three. Connell is also credited with producing A Midsummer Night's Dream and Hansel and Gretel at the Avenue Theatre Company based in Greenwich during this time period as well as the short film Sapphire Strange and web series John and Jane.

Since moving to the United States in 2011, Connell has had lead roles in the award-winning independent film Folklore as well as in the feature films The Cursed Man, based on the cult novel by Keith Rommel, and Hara Kiri, a punk infused love story of two street skaters, directed by Aitch Alberto. She has replaced Kelly Macdonald as the voice of Merida in several productions, such as the video game Disney Infinity 3.0, Disney Dreamlight Valley and the Sofia the First episode "The Secret Library". From 2014 to 2020 Connell played Rowena, a powerful witch and also the mother of the King of Hell, Crowley (Mark A. Sheppard), on the TV series Supernatural starting in season 10 up until its fifteenth and final season and has been one of the longest running female characters on the show.

== Personal life ==
Connell is in a relationship with her Supernatural co-star, Rob Benedict. They have a daughter, who was born in January 2024.

== Filmography ==
=== Film ===
Year	Title	Role	Notes
2012	A Perfect Ending	Mourner	
2012	Folklore	MaryLane Heth	
2012	Sh*t British People Say in the USA	Ruth	YouTube
2013	Meth Head	Louise	
2016	Hara Kiri	Candy	
2016	The Cursed Man	Bonnie	
2018	For the Love of George	Stacy	
2021	The Loud House Movie	Chip Shoppe Owner / Car Driver / Additional voices	Voice role
2023	Nandor Fodor and the Talking Mongoose	Mrs. Irving	

=== Television ===
Year	Title	Role	Notes
2003	Meades Eats	Medical Staff	Episode: "Fast Food"
2010	Above Their Station	Olga	Television film
2014–2019	Supernatural	Rowena MacLeod	Recurring role
2015	Sofia the First	Merida (voice)	Episode: "The Secret Library"
2017	Open House	Linda	Episode: "Like A Clam"
2021	Doom Patrol	Night Nurse	Episode: "Dead Patrol"
2023	The Winchesters	Rowena MacLeod	Episode: "The Tears of a Clown"
2024	Dead Boy Detectives	Night Nurse	Main cast

=== Video games ===
Year	Title	Role	Notes
2014	Disney Infinity: Marvel Super Heroes	Merida	Voice
2015	Disney Infinity 3.0	Merida	Voice
2018	Lego The Incredibles	Merida	Voice
2023	Truth	Gameshow Contestant	Full-motion video
2023	Starfield	Polly Mac Coinnich	Voice
2024	Disney Dreamlight Valley	Merida	Voice
