= Jared Padalecki =

American actor (born 1982)

- Padalecki at Creation Entertainment Orlando in 2026
- Born: Jared Tristan Padalecki; July 19, 1982 (age 44); San Antonio, Texas, U.S.
- Occupation: Actor
- Years active: 1999–present
- Known for: Sam Winchester in Supernatural
- Spouse: Genevieve Cortese (m. 2010)
- Children: 3

Jared Tristan Padalecki (born July 19, 1982) is an American actor. He is best known for playing the lead role of Sam Winchester in the dark fantasy series Supernatural (2005–2020) after raising to fame in the early 2000s thanks to his appearances on the comedy drama series Gilmore Girls (2000–2005) as well as the films Flight of the Phoenix (2004), House of Wax (2005) and Friday the 13th (2009). He also played the title role in the action crime drama series Walker (2021–2024).

== Early life and education ==
Padalecki was born in San Antonio, Texas to Gerald and Sherri Padalecki. His father is of Polish descent, while his mother has German, Scottish, French and English ancestry.

He was a 2000 candidate for the Presidential Scholars Program. In 1998, Padalecki and his partner Chris Cardenas won the National Forensic League national championship in Duo Interpretation. Although he had originally planned to attend the University of Texas after graduating from high school in 2000, Padalecki decided to move to Los Angeles County, California instead to pursue an acting career.

== Career ==
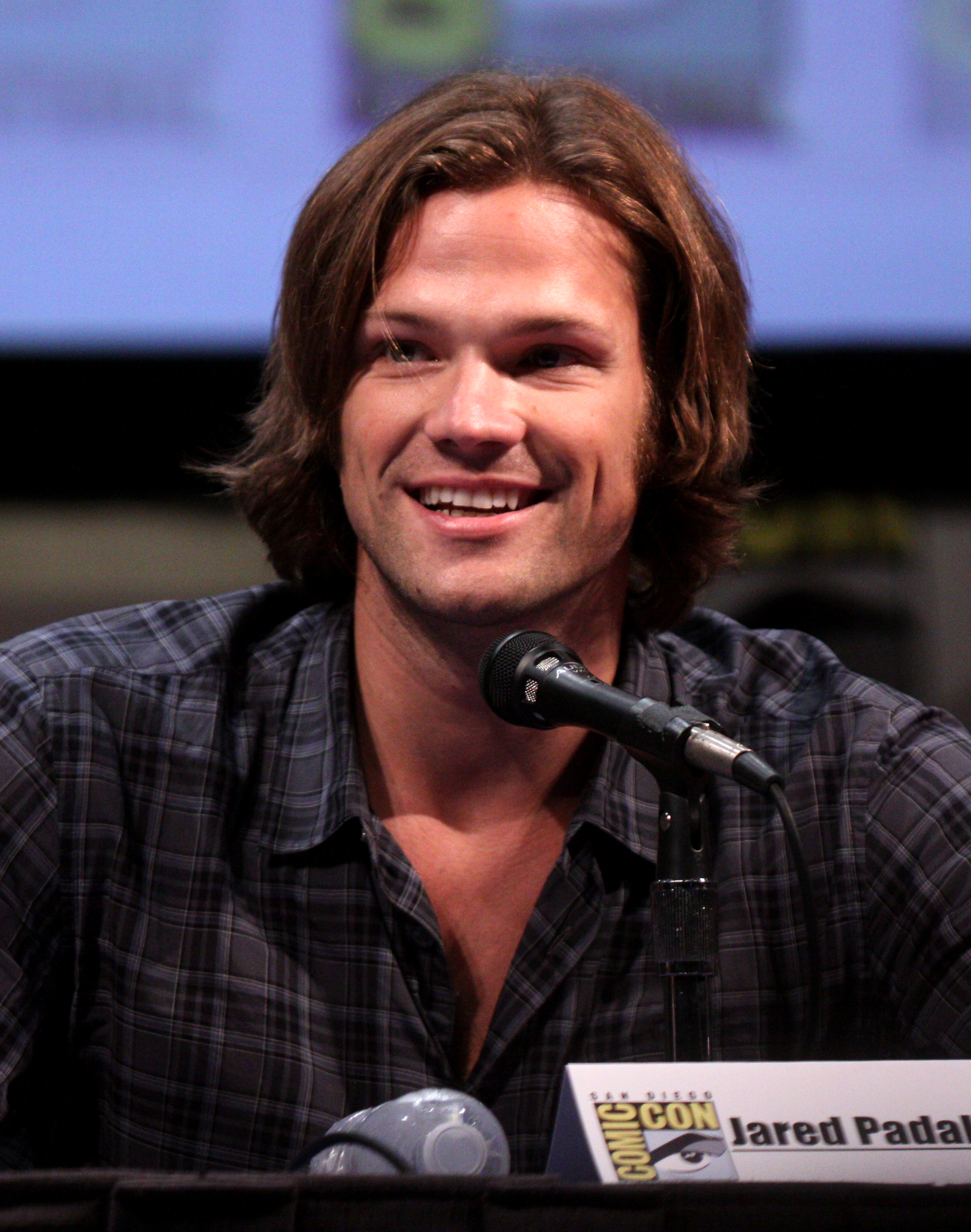
Padalecki at San Diego Comic-Con in 2011

Padalecki won Fox Broadcasting's 1999 "Claim to Fame Contest"; he subsequently appeared at the Teen Choice Awards, where he met an agent. His first role was a minor role in the 1999 film A Little Inside. In 2000, he was cast as Dean Forester on the television series Gilmore Girls, a role he played until 2005. Throughout the early 2000s, he appeared in several made-for-television films, including Silent Witness, Close to Home and the Disney Channel Original Movie A Ring of Endless Light.

Padalecki had an uncredited role as a high school bully in 2003's comedy Cheaper by the Dozen, which he played after being asked by fellow actor and friend Tom Welling, who played Charlie Baker, and the director of the movie, who wanted someone larger than Charlie to pick on him. Padalecki originally auditioned for Welling's role, but gave it up in order to film a pilot titled Young MacGyver which was never picked up.

In 2004, he appeared in the Mary-Kate and Ashley Olsen comedy New York Minute as Trey Lipton, a cute boy to whom the Olsens' characters are attracted. He also landed a short role in the thriller Flight of the Phoenix alongside Dennis Quaid and Hugh Laurie. In 2005, Padalecki starred opposite Elisha Cuthbert, Chad Michael Murray and Paris Hilton in House of Wax as Wade. In 2005, he appeared in Cry Wolf, another horror film, as Tom.

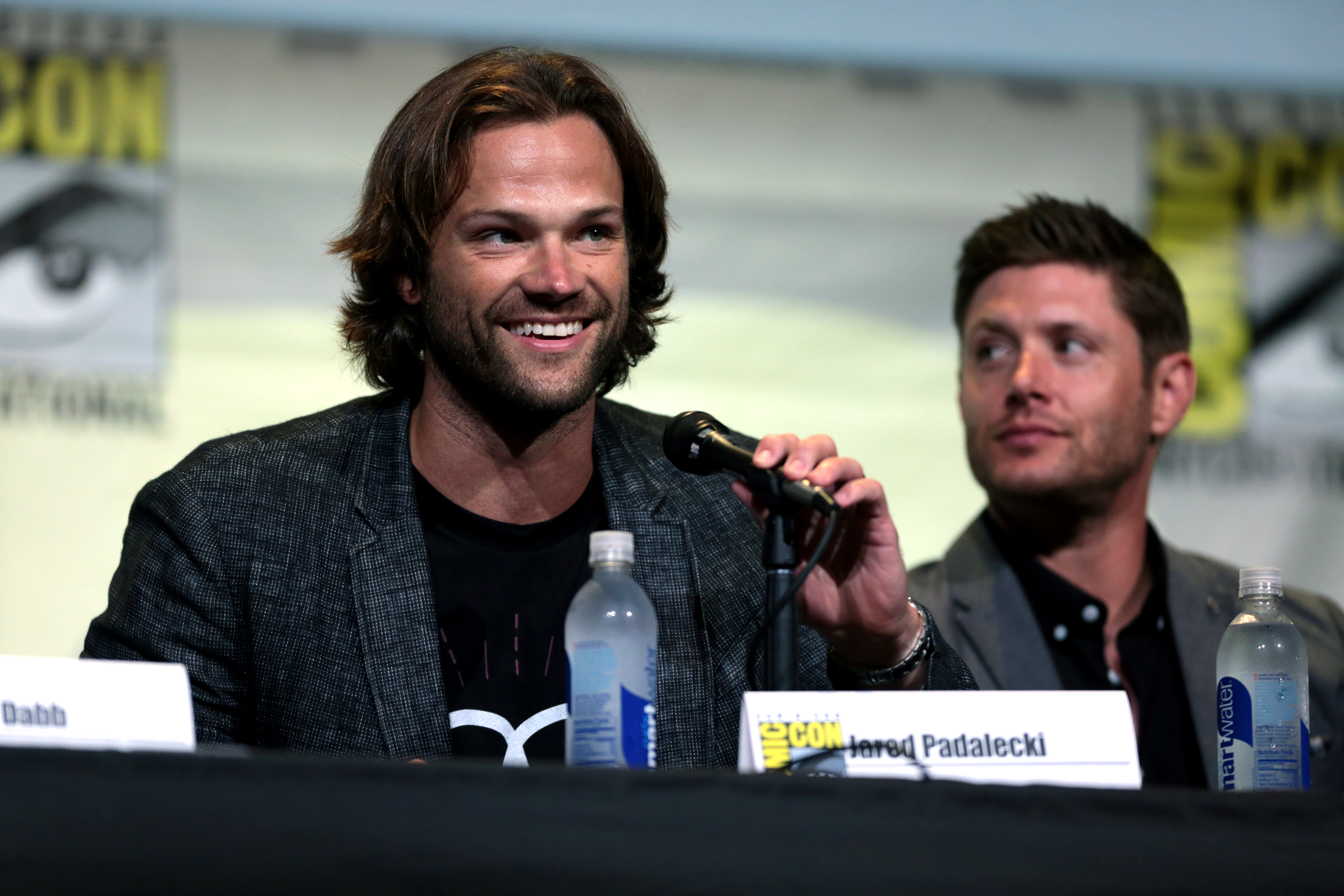
Padalecki and his Supernatural costar Jensen Ackles at San Diego Comic-Con in 2016

Also in 2005, Padalecki was cast as Sam Winchester on the WB series, Supernatural. The show ended in 2020, after fifteen seasons, making it the longest-running North American sci-fi series in history.

In 2007, Jared served as the host of MTV's horror reality series, Room 401, which was discontinued after only eight episodes due to poor ratings.

He had the lead role in 2008's Christmas Cottage as Thomas Kinkade, alongside acclaimed actor Peter O'Toole.

He also had the lead role in the 2009 version of Friday the 13th as Clay Miller, a character who heads out to Camp Crystal Lake in search of his sister who has gone missing.

In September 2019, Padalecki was announced as the title role in Walker, a reboot series of Walker, Texas Ranger in development at The CW. The reboot was ordered to series in January 2020 and premiered in January 2021. The series was cancelled in 2024 after four seasons. A month later, Padalecki agreed to guest star on The Boys, the Amazon Prime Video superhero drama helmed by Supernatural creator, Eric Kripke. In August 2024, it was announced that Padalecki would join the cast of Fire Country for a three-episode guest stint with the possibility of headlining a spinoff.

In September 2025, it was announced that Padalecki would star in a Netflix film adaptation of Katherine Center's novel The Bodyguard, opposite Leighton Meester.

== Personal life ==
Padalecki's engagement to his Supernatural co-star Genevieve Cortese was announced in January 2010. They met when Cortese guest-starred as Ruby on the show's fourth season. Padalecki proposed to her in front of their favorite painting, Joan of Arc, by French realist Jules Bastien-Lepage at New York's Metropolitan Museum of Art in October 2009. The pair married on February 27, 2010, in Cortese's hometown of Sun Valley, Idaho. They have three children.

Padalecki supported Beto O'Rourke for the 2018 Senate election in Texas alongside Supernatural co-stars Jensen Ackles and Misha Collins.

Padalecki was also the owner of Stereotype, a '90s-themed bar in Austin, Texas, which opened in 2018. Following a physical altercation at the bar on 27 October 2019, Padalecki was arrested and charged with public intoxication as well as two counts of assault causing bodily injury before being released on bond the same day.

=== Always Keep Fighting ===
In March 2015, Padalecki launched his Always Keep Fighting campaign through Represent.com. His first campaign raised funds for To Write Love on Her Arms, which supports people struggling with depression, addiction, self-injury and suicide. The cause is particularly close to Padalecki, who has been candid about his own struggles with depression. For the second campaign in the Always Keep Fighting series in April 2015, Padalecki partnered with co-star Jensen Ackles to release a shirt featuring both of their faces, to benefit their newly formed joint charitable fund. Over 70,000 shirts were sold. Later, Padalecki launched a third campaign selling a further 40,000 shirts.

During San Diego Comic-Con 2015, more than 6,000 fans surprised Padalecki at the Supernatural panel by holding up candles for him, after having revealed his battle with depression earlier in the year.

== Filmography ==
=== Film ===
Year	Title	Role	Notes
1999	A Little Inside	Matt Nelson	
2003	Cheaper by the Dozen	High School Bully	Uncredited
2004	New York Minute	Trey Lipton	
2004	Flight of the Phoenix	John Davis	
2005	House of Wax	Wade Felton	
2005	Cry Wolf	Tom Jordan	
2007	House of Fears	J.P.	Uncredited
2008	Christmas Cottage	Thomas Kinkade	
2009	Friday the 13th	Clay Miller	
2015	Phantom Boy	Lieutenant Alex	Voice role English dub
2026	Guarding Stars	Jack Stapleton	Also producer

=== Television ===
Year	Title	Role	Notes
2000	Silent Witness	Sam	Television film
2000–2005	Gilmore Girls	Dean Forester	Recurring role (seasons 1, 4 & 5); main role (seasons 2 & 3)
2001	ER	Paul Harris	Episode: "Piece of Mind"
2002	A Ring of Endless Light	Zachery Gray	Television film
2003	Young MacGyver	Clay MacGyver	Unsold television pilot
2004	I Love the '90s	Himself	Documentary miniseries
2005–2020	Supernatural	Sam Winchester	Main role
2007	Room 401	Himself	Host
2011	Supernatural: The Anime Series	Sam Winchester	Voice role
2015, 2018	The Hillywood Show	Dancer / Himself / Ghostbuster	Guest role
2016	Gilmore Girls: A Year in the Life	Dean Forester	Episode: "Fall"
2017	Kings of Con	Jaden Jaworski	Episode: "Arlington, VA"
2021–2024	Walker	Cordell Walker	Main role Also executive producer
2023	Walker: Independence	Unnamed	Cameo; episode: "How We Got Here"
2024	Fire Country	Camden	Guest role
2026	The Rookie	Himself	Episode: "Survive the Streets"
2026	The Boys	Mister Marathon	Episode: "One-Shots"

== Awards and nominations ==
Year	Work	Award	Category	Result	Ref.
2002	Gilmore Girls	Teen Choice Award	Choice TV Actor Drama	Nominated	
2005	House of Wax	Teen Choice Award	Choice Movie: Male Breakout Star	Nominated	
2007	Supernatural	Constellation Award	Best Male Performance in a 2006 Science Fiction Television Episode (for "Croatoan")	Nominated	
2007	Supernatural	Teen Choice Award	Choice TV Actor Drama	Nominated	
2008	Supernatural	Constellation Award	Best Male Performance in a 2007 Science Fiction Television Episode (for "Born Under a Bad Sign")	Nominated	
2008	Supernatural	SFX Award	Best TV Actor	Nominated	
2011	Supernatural	Teen Choice Award	Choice TV Actor Fantasy/Sci-Fi	Nominated	
2012	Supernatural	Teen Choice Award	Choice TV Actor Fantasy/Sci-Fi	Nominated	
2013	Supernatural	Constellation Award	Best Male Performance in a 2012 Science Fiction Television Episode (for "The Born-Again Identity")	Nominated	
2013	Supernatural	People's Choice Award	Favorite Dramatic TV Actor	Nominated	
2013	Supernatural	SFX Award	Best TV Actor	Nominated	
2013	Supernatural	SFX Award	Sexiest Man	Nominated	
2013	Supernatural	Teen Choice Award	Choice TV Actor Fantasy/Sci-Fi	Nominated	
2014	Supernatural	People's Choice Award	Favorite Sci-Fi/Fantasy TV Actor	Nominated	
2014	Supernatural	People's Choice Award	Favorite TV Bromance (shared with Jensen Ackles and Misha Collins)	Won	
2015	Supernatural	People's Choice Award	Favorite Sci-Fi/Fantasy TV Actor	Nominated	
2015	Supernatural	People's Choice Award	Favorite TV Duo (shared with Jensen Ackles)	Nominated	
2015	Supernatural	Teen Choice Award	Choice Sci-Fi/Fantasy TV Actor	Won	
2019	Supernatural	Teen Choice Award	Choice Sci-Fi/Fantasy TV Actor	Won	
2021	Supernatural	Critics' Choice Super Award	Best Actor in a Horror Series	Nominated	
