= List of Supernatural and The Winchesters characters =

Jensen Ackles as Dean Winchester (left) and Jared Padalecki as Sam Winchester (right)

Supernatural is an American television drama series created by writer and producer Eric Kripke. It was initially broadcast by The WB network from September 13, 2005, but after the first season, the WB and UPN networks merged to form The CW network, which was the final broadcaster for the show in the United States by the series' conclusion on November 19, 2020, with 327 episodes aired. The Winchesters, a spin-off prequel/sequel series to Supernatural developed by Robbie Thompson, Jensen Ackles and Danneel Ackles, aired on The CW for 13 episodes from October 11, 2022, to March 7, 2023.

Supernatural and The Winchesters each feature two main characters, Sam Winchester (played by Jared Padalecki) and Dean Winchester (played by Jensen Ackles), and Mary Campbell (played by Meg Donnelly) and John Winchester (played by Drake Rodger).

In Supernatural, the two Winchester brothers are hunters who travel across the United States, mainly to the Midwest, in a black 1967 Chevy Impala to hunt demons, werewolves, vampires, ghosts, witches, and other supernatural creatures. Supernatural chronicles the relationship between the brothers, their friends, and their father. Throughout the seasons, the brothers work to fight evil, keep each other alive, and avenge those they have lost. In The Winchesters, Dean Winchester narrates the story of how his parents John Winchester and Mary Campbell met, fell in love and fought monsters together while in search for their missing fathers.

Supernatural features many recurring guests that help Sam Winchester and Dean Winchester with their hunts and quests. Frequent returning characters include hunter Bobby Singer (who becomes a father figure to Sam and Dean after season two), Castiel (an angel), Crowley (a demon and the King of Hell), and Jack Kline (the Nephilim). The series also featured recurring appearances from other angels, demons, and hunters.

== Cast ==
List indicator

This section includes characters who will appear or have appeared in at least one season.

- A green cell indicates the actor is a main cast member.
- A red cell indicates the actor is a recurring cast member.
- A light blue cell indicates the actor is a guest or special guest cast member.

=== Main ===
Actor	Character	Supernatural															Win.
Actor	Character	1	2	3	4	5	6	7	8	9	10	11	12	13	14	15	Win.
Jared Padalecki	Sam Winchester	✓	✓	✓	✓	✓	✓	✓	✓	✓	✓	✓	✓	✓	✓	✓	
Jensen Ackles	Dean Winchester	✓	✓	✓	✓	✓	✓	✓	✓	✓	✓	✓	✓	✓	✓	✓	✓ (Note: Narrator)
Jensen Ackles	Dean Winchester	✓	✓	✓	✓	✓	✓	✓	✓	✓	✓	✓	✓	✓	✓	✓	✓
Katie Cassidy	Ruby			✓													
Lauren Cohan	Bela Talbot			✓													
Misha Collins	Castiel				✓	✓	✓	✓	✓	✓	✓	✓	✓	✓	✓	✓	
Misha Collins	Jimmy Novak				✓						✓						
Mark A. Sheppard	Crowley					✓	✓	✓	✓	✓	✓	✓	✓				
Mark Pellegrino	Lucifer					✓		✓				✓	✓	✓	✓	✓ (Note: Special Guest)	
Mark Pellegrino	Nick					✓									✓		
Alexander Calvert	Jack Kline												✓	✓	✓	✓	✓
Alexander Calvert	Belphegor															✓	
Meg Donnelly	Mary Winchester																✓
Drake Rodger	John Winchester																✓
Nida Khurshid	Latika Desai																✓
Jojo Fleites	Carlos Cervantez																✓
Demetria McKinney	Ada Monroe																✓
Bianca Kajlich	Millie Winchester																✓

=== Recurring ===
Actor	Character	Supernatural															Win.
Actor	Character	1	2	3	4	5	6	7	8	9	10	11	12	13	14	15	Win.
Jeffrey Dean Morgan (Note: The character was portrayed by multiple actors, with the listed actor being the primary actor.)	John Winchester	✓	✓	✓ (Note: Voice only)	✓	✓			✓			✓			✓		
Frederic Lehne	Azazel	✓	✓		✓		✓										
Nicki Aycox	Meg Masters	✓			✓												
Rachel Miner	Meg Masters					✓	✓	✓	✓								
Rachel Miner	The Shadow / The Empty													✓	✓	✓	
Jim Beaver	Bobby Singer	✓	✓	✓	✓	✓	✓	✓	✓ (Note: Special Appearance)	✓	✓	✓	✓	✓	✓	✓	✓
Samantha Ferris	Ellen Harvelle		✓			✓	✓										
Alona Tal	Jo Harvelle		✓			✓		✓									
Chad Lindberg	Ash		✓			✓											
Genevieve Cortese/Padalecki	Ruby				✓											✓	
Genevieve Cortese/Padalecki	Herself						✓										
Kurt Fuller	Zachariah				✓	✓								✓	✓		
Traci Dinwiddie	Pamela Barnes				✓	✓									✓		
Julie McNiven	Anna Milton				✓	✓											
Robert Wisdom	Uriel				✓	✓											
Katherine Boecher	Lilith			✓	✓											✓	
Christopher Heyerdahl	Alastair				✓												
Rob Benedict	Chuck Shurley / God				✓	✓					✓	✓			✓	✓	
Rob Benedict	Tango																✓
Mitch Pileggi	Samuel Campbell				✓		✓										
Tom Welling	Samuel Campbell																✓
Cindy Sampson	Lisa Braeden			✓		✓	✓										
Nicholas Elia	Ben Braeden			✓			✓										
Demore Barnes	Raphael					✓	✓										
Jessica Heafey	Gwen Campbell						✓										
Corin Nemec	Christian Campbell						✓										
Sebastian Roché	Balthazar						✓										
Kim Johnston Ulrich	Eleanor Visyak						✓										
Julia Maxwell	Eve						✓										
Osric Chau	Kevin Tran							✓	✓	✓		✓		✓		✓	
Kim Rhodes	Jody Mills					✓	✓	✓	✓	✓	✓	✓	✓	✓	✓	✓	
Kevin McNally	Frank Devereaux							✓									
Benito Martinez	Edgar							✓									
Cameron Bancroft	Dr. Gaines							✓									
Sean Owen Roberts	Chet							✓									
James Patrick Stuart	Dick Roman							✓									
Olivia Cheng	Susan							✓									
Curtis Armstrong	Metatron								✓	✓	✓	✓					
Alaina Huffman	Abaddon								✓	✓							
Ty Olsson	Benny Lafitte								✓		✓					✓	
Amanda Tapping	Naomi								✓					✓	✓		
Liane Balaban	Amelia Richardson								✓								
Tyler Johnston	Samandriel								✓								
Erica Carroll	Hannah									✓	✓	✓					
Tahmoh Penikett	Gadreel									✓							
Ruth Connell	Rowena MacLeod										✓	✓	✓	✓	✓	✓	✓
Kathryn Newton	Claire Novak				✓						✓	✓	✓	✓			
Felicia Day	Charlie Bradbury							✓	✓	✓	✓			✓	✓	✓	
Travis Aaron Wade	Cole Trenton										✓						
Lisa Berry	Billie / Death											✓	✓	✓	✓	✓	
Emily Swallow	Amara / The Darkness											✓				✓	
Samantha Smith	Mary Winchester	✓	✓		✓	✓	✓					✓	✓	✓	✓		
David Haydn-Jones	Arthur Ketch												✓	✓	✓	✓	
Courtney Ford	Kelly Kline												✓	✓	✓		
Elizabeth Blackmore	Lady Toni Bevell											✓	✓				
Rick Springfield	Vince Vincente												✓				
Woody Jeffreys	Tommy												✓				
Adam Fergus	Mick Davies												✓				
Ali Ahn	Dagon												✓				
Gillian Barber	Doctor Hess												✓				
Christian Keyes	Michael					✓								✓	✓	✓	
Danneel Ackles	Sister Jo / Anael													✓	✓	✓	
Richard Speight Jr.	Gabriel		✓	✓		✓				✓				✓			
Richard Speight Jr.	Loki													✓			✓
Clark Backo	Patience Turner													✓			
Jeffrey Vincent Parise	Asmodeus													✓			
Katherine Evans	Maggie													✓	✓		
Shoshannah Stern	Eileen Leahy											✓	✓			✓	
Gil McKinney	Henry Winchester								✓	✓							✓
Bridget Regan	Rockin' Roxy																✓
Andrea Londo	Betty Donelan																✓
Ryan McCartan	Kyle Reed																✓

=== Notable guests ===
Actor	Character	Supernatural															Win.
Actor	Character	1	2	3	4	5	6	7	8	9	10	11	12	13	14	15	Win.
Adrianne Palicki	Jessica Moore	✓	✓			✓											
A.J. Buckley	Ed Zeddmore	✓		✓	✓	✓				✓							
Travis Wester	Harry Spengler	✓		✓	✓	✓				✓							
Sarah Shahi	Constance Welch	✓															
Shanae Tomasevich	Constance Welch														✓	✓	
Jovanna Huguet	Mary Worthington	✓													✓	✓	
Christine Chatelain	Jenny	✓														✓	
Loretta Devine	Missouri Moseley	✓												✓			
Charles Malik Whitfield	Victor Henriksen		✓	✓	✓												
Sterling K. Brown	Gordon Walker		✓	✓													
Lindsey McKeon	Tessa		✓		✓		✓			✓							
Steven Williams	Rufus Turner			✓		✓	✓	✓				✓					
Carrie Ann Fleming	Karen Singer			✓		✓		✓									
Jake Abel	Adam Milligan				✓	✓										✓	
Julian Richings	Death					✓	✓	✓		✓	✓						
Emily Perkins	Becky Rosen					✓		✓								✓	
Rick Worthy	Alpha Vampire						✓	✓					✓				
Theo Devaney	Gavin MacLeod						✓			✓			✓				
DJ Qualls	Garth Fitzgerald IV							✓	✓	✓					✓	✓	
Lauren Tom	Linda Tran							✓	✓	✓							
Alaina Huffman	Josie Sands								✓	✓							
Briana Buckmaster	Donna Hanscum									✓	✓	✓		✓	✓	✓	
Danielle Kremeniuk	Ingrid									✓	✓						
Katherine Ramdeen	Alex Jones									✓		✓	✓	✓			
Sarah Smyth	Bess Fitzgerald									✓						✓	
Jesse Reid	Jervis											✓	✓				
Keith Szarabajka	Donatello Redfield											✓		✓	✓	✓	
Alicia Witt	Lily Sunder												✓		✓		
Yadira Guevara-Prip	Kaia Nieves													✓	✓	✓	
Erica Cerra	Dumah													✓	✓		
Chris Nowland	John Wayne Gacy														✓	✓	
Dimitri Vantis	Sergei														✓	✓	

== Angels and reapers ==
Angels of God are extremely powerful spiritual beings. Merely perceiving their true form - even psychically - typically results in blindness, as the appearance of their natural "visage" is overwhelming. Only a select few can withstand their true appearances and voices, though no one is ever featured on the show that could do so. They often take human vessels to exist in and interact with the physical world; however, they can only enter with the hosts' consent. Angels need a particular vessel called the "chosen" one or "true vessels" to be their host if they want to reach their full potential.

Most angels are portrayed as emotionless authoritarian beings. Some angels show disdain for humanity, noting that humans are flawed and inferior creations. Lucifer was the only angel to refuse kneeling before humans at God's command. All angels, fallen or not, refer to each other as siblings and refer to God as their Father. However, most angels never actually meet or talk to God. God, their former leader, is noted as missing throughout the majority of the show, leaving the angels to protect humanity instead. There is a ranking among the angels, with the higher ranks commanding those at a lower rank.

Creator Eric Kripke originally did not want angels to be featured in the series, believing God worked through hunters rather than angels. However, with so many demon villains, he and the writers changed their minds when they realized that the show needed angels to create a "cosmic battle" between the angels and demons. As Kripke put it, "We had the empire, but we didn't really have the rebellion." They wanted to have a storyline with a few central characters, but with the massive battles in the background, comparable to Star Wars and The Lord of the Rings, the addition of angels allowed for this. Kripke eventually found that it opened up new storylines to include in the show.

=== Anael ===
Anael, portrayed by Danneel Ackles, is described as a low-level functionary. She first appears in season 12's "Devil's Bargain" in the guise of her vessel Sister Jo, working as a faith healer. Anael is found by Lucifer who is seeking angels to drain their grace in order to recharge his own. Recognizing the rogue archangel, Anael instead convinces Lucifer to take bits of her grace, allow her to recharge and then take some more. The Winchesters and Castiel eventually track down Anael and Lucifer. Anael pretends to comply with them, claiming that Lucifer is extremely weak. In their motel room, Anael aids Lucifer in fighting the Winchesters and Castiel. Before Lucifer can kill them, Arthur Ketch appears and throws a demon bomb, causing Lucifer to grab Anael and teleport away. At Anael's suggestion, Lucifer next visits the Heavenly Portal where he promises to restore the angels' wings and help make new angels if they will bow to him as their undisputed leader. Anael later stands by Lucifer's side as the angels all bow to him in Heaven's Throne Room.

Anael again appears in season 12's "Bring 'em Back Alive" as Lucifer's second-in-command, growing increasingly frustrated with Lucifer's antics. Lucifer eventually admits to Anael that he had lied that he could restore angels' wings and make new angels and violently lashes out at her, but cannot bring himself to kill Anael. Fed up, Anael tells Lucifer that he now has nothing and has lost her too. Lucifer subsequently abandons Heaven. In "Funeralia", it is revealed than Anael is one of less than a dozen angels alive in all of creation. She makes minor appearances in seasons 14 and 15.

=== Balthazar ===
Balthazar, portrayed by Sebastian Roché, is an angel who had fought alongside Castiel during the last angelic war. Believed dead, this was merely a cover as he left Heaven, taking weapons with him. He has been on Earth enjoying a hedonistic lifestyle. In "The Third Man", the Winchesters discover that three corrupt cops were murdered by the young brother of one of their victims in possession of The Staff of Moses. Balthazar is revealed to have sold it to the boy in return for his soul. During a conflict with Raphael and his henchmen, Balthazar destroys the archangel's vessel with Lot's Salt. Dean then traps Balthazar in a ring of Holy Fire and forces him to give up the boy's soul. They want more from him, but Castiel releases him because he owes him his life. Sam uses an Enochian ritual to summon Balthazar, in "Appointment in Samarra". Sam asks him if there is any way to keep a soul out of its body. Balthazar informs him of a ritual that involves him defiling his vessel, helping Sam because he would find it useful to have Sam in his debt. He tells Sam that he would need the blood of his father (that need not come from the "father of your blood"), prompting Sam to try to kill Bobby before he is subdued, Dean and Death recover Sam's soul. In "The French Mistake" Balthazar transports Sam and Dean to an alternate universe to evade the angelic hit man Virgil and gives them a key that he claims gives access to the weapons he stole from Heaven. This is revealed to have been a ploy by Balthazar and Castiel to allow the latter to retrieve the weapons from their true location while Raphael was distracted. A suspicious alias used by Balthazar in 1912 leads to the brothers summoning Balthazar in "My Heart Will Go On". Balthazar claims he had saved the Titanic simply because he detested the movie and subsequent eponymous song. However, upon confrontation with Fate, Atropos reveals she knows Balthazar is working for Castiel; saving the Titanic was to provide additional souls to fund their side in the civil war. Castiel pulls out of the plan to kill Atropos once she threatens the Winchesters, stopping Balthazar from killing her. When the Winchesters reveal that Castiel is in league with Crowley in "Let It Bleed", Balthazar agrees to assist the brothers and act as a double agent. He then transports Sam and Dean to where Lisa and Ben are being held captive. In "The Man Who Knew too Much", Balthazar begins to have second thoughts about betraying Castiel, but ultimately continues to assist the brothers. He informs Dean and Bobby of where the ritual to open the gate to Purgatory will take place. Castiel summons Balthazar and reveals that he is aware of his actions, Balthazar is then killed by Castiel.

=== Bartholomew ===
An angel, portrayed by Adam J. Harrington, who after the fall began gathering other angels into a faction to retake and rule Heaven. Bartholomew is described as a protege of Naomi and in "I'm No Angel", uses Internet preacher Reverend Buddy Boyle to find vessels for other angels. Wanting revenge for the expulsion of the angels, Bartholomew sends his followers after Castiel and when he wards himself against angelic detection, rogue reapers. In "Holy Terror", Bartholomew has shifted to using Boyle to target select groups rather than the whole world so he can control who becomes a vessel, wanting only his followers to gain vessels. After some of Bartholomew's angels are slaughtered by angels under the command of anarchist Malachi, Bartholomew refuses a meeting with him and starts an angelic civil war between his and Malachi's factions. In "Captives", Bartholomew has begun destroying all other factions, including peaceful ones as he sees them threats to his power and his men capture Castiel. Bartholomew is pleased by this, having apparently put aside his previous resentment as he is Castiel's old friend and ally. Bartholomew invites Castiel to join him, having turned all of his human followers into vessels and using their resources to track Metatron when he appears on Earth. Bartholomew believes with Castiel on his side he can unite the angels under his command and retake Heaven, but Castiel refuses to help when he tortures an innocent angel. When Castiel refuses to kill the angel, Bartholomew attacks him, but Castiel overpowers him. Though Castiel has Bartholomew at his mercy, he refuses to kill him as he wants no more angel deaths and lets him go. Bartholomew refuses to stop and draws a second angel sword and attacks Castiel while his back is turned. With no other choice, Castiel kills Bartholomew in self-defense with his own sword. Afterwards, several of his followers decide to follow Castiel, having seen a different way in Castiel's refusal to kill him and desire for no more bloodshed.

=== Billie ===
Billie, portrayed by Lisa Berry, was introduced in Season 11. She is a reaper first appearing in "Form and Void". She meets Sam inside a hospital whose inhabitants are dying due to the Darkness' infection, with her acting as their reaper. Despite Dean having killed Death in the previous season, souls must still be collected. Billie tells Sam that she is tired of seeing him and Dean dying and coming back over and over again, promising them that the next time they die, she will put them into the Empty, where no soul can escape. Billie senses that Sam is "unclean in the Biblical sense" and believes that she will be reaping him soon. Though Sam comes close to succumbing to his Rabid infection, he remembers Billie's comment about being "unclean in the Biblical sense" and discovers a cure through holy fire after looking up Biblical purifications.

In "The Devil in the Details", Billie returns guarding a door into Hell for Crowley, stating that it is useful for her to have the King of Hell owe her in such troubled times. When Dean arrives, Billie lets him in before revealing her identity to him. Billie makes it clear that while she does not actually want to kill the Winchesters, she just intends to make sure they remain dead when they die. Billie gives a Dean a witchcatcher she has located for Crowley and later lets Castiel through the door when he is unexpectedly teleported into the room.

In "Red Meat", a desperate Dean decides to contact Billie to make a deal after Sam's apparent death. Dean commits suicide through a drug overdose of prescription pills. As a doctor desperately tries to revive Dean, Billie arrives and freezes time to "savor the moment". Though Dean tries to bargain with Billie, she refuses, intent on taking him to the Empty. Though Dean insists that Sam is the only one who can beat the Darkness, Billie disagrees and tells Dean that even if Sam could defeat the Darkness, she would not bring him back and that "the answer will always be no". Billie then tells the shocked Dean that Sam's not actually dead as she would have been told if Sam had died. Billie unfreezes time and prepares to take Dean to the Empty, but the doctor is able to revive Dean with a shot of adrenaline to the heart. Disappointed, Billie departs alone.

In "Alpha and Omega", Billie witnesses the Winchesters collecting ghosts at Waverly Hills Sanatorium and follows them to the Men of Letters bunker where she senses that God is dying. After the Winchesters, Castiel, Crowley and God explain their plan to her, Billie agrees to help, stating "little tip—you want souls, call a reaper". Billie is able to draw a couple of hundred thousand souls from the Veil into the crystal for the Winchesters' Soul Bomb, giving them the means to potentially kill the Darkness. Billie departs after saying goodbye to Crowley and tells Dean that while they will see her again, she hopes it is not today.

In the Season 12 episode "Celebrating the Life of Asa Fox", Billie returns to reap the souls of those killed by the demon Jael, warning Dean, who is trapped outside of the house, of the threat. Dean begs Billie to help him get back in, promising that he will owe her in exchange. Billie agrees and throws Dean straight through the door to the house. After Jael is exorcised, Billie reappears to claim what Dean owes her: the recently resurrected Mary Winchester. Billie recognizes that Mary is struggling to deal with her return and offers her peace. Mary confirms that Billie cannot kill Mary herself due to the rules and ultimately chooses to stay rather than leave her sons again. Billie leaves Mary be and tells the Winchesters that if they ever want peace, all they have to do is call for her.

In "First Blood", Billie reappears at midnight after the Winchesters escape Site 94. Sam and Dean reveal that they were going insane while in captivity so they summoned Billie and made a deal with her: in exchange for Billie temporarily killing and then later reviving them so that they could escape, one Winchester would die permanently at midnight. Billie made the Winchesters seal the deal in blood and warns that breaking such a deal could have cosmic consequences. As Mary is a Winchester, she decides to sacrifice herself rather than force one of her sons to die and Billie keeps Sam and Dean from interfering. Before Mary can commit suicide, Billie is killed from behind by Castiel with an angel blade, to the Winchesters' shock. Castiel expresses a belief that the world cannot afford to lose even one of the family and he was acting in their best interests by killing Billie to break the deal. As a result, Dean is pissed with Castiel through "Lily Sunder Has Some Regrets", eventually admitting that he is worried about Billie's warning of cosmic consequences for breaking the deal.

In the Season 13 episode "Advanced Thanatology", Billie unexpectedly returns after Dean briefly commits suicide to learn the location of the remains of a group of ghosts. When Sam cannot revive Dean, Billie appears and stops time. Billie reveals to Dean that one of the rules of the Universe is that when one incarnation of Death is killed, the next reaper to die will take his place. As a result, Billie has been resurrected as the new Death with a new outfit and a ring and scythe like the old Death. Billie transports Dean to her office in the Veil and asks him about the rift that had opened briefly to another universe. Dean agrees to tell Billie what she wants to know if she will free the trapped ghosts, a deal Billie accepts and sends the reaper Jessica to complete. Dean explains the circumstances behind the rift and Billie shows him her library displaying all the possible methods of death for a person. With a new outlook on life and death, Billie soon recognizes how much Dean has changed from his selfless deal and that he actually wants to die. Rather than taking him to the Empty, an amused Billie tells Dean to keep living and personally resurrects Dean. After his return to life, Dean tells Sam about his encounter with Billie as Death.

In "Funeralia", the witch Rowena begins killing people and the reapers sent to collect their souls in order to attract Billie's attention and force her to resurrect Crowley. In response, Billie has the reaper Jessica, who she has had following the Winchesters around, alert them to the threat. However, Jessica is unable to intervene directly due to Billie's rules and cannot offer more than information. Jessica also passes along a message from Billie that all versions of Rowena's final death have her killed by Sam. After Rowena begins torturing Sam, Billie appears in person and refuses to bow to Rowena's blackmail. Billie easily withstands Rowena's magical barrage and offers sympathy to Rowena who she recognizes has changed, but continues to refuse to bring back Crowley. Before departing, Billie promises Dean to "see you soon" and Rowena's magical attack on Billie is revealed to have exhausted her enhanced powers, possibly to the point that they will never recover.

In the Season 14 episode "Nihilism", Sam attempts to get the reaper Violet to transport himself, Castiel, Jack, and Michael to safety. Violet refuses because of Billie's rules before they are unexpectedly teleported to the Bunker. After Michael is locked away in Dean's mind, he is visited by Billie who he realizes had saved them despite breaking the rules. Billie admits that she "took a gamble" by helping them and reminds Dean of the time he visited her reading room which showed the many ways he could die. Billie reveals that every single version of his fate but one now has Michael breaking free and using Dean's body to destroy the world. She chides Dean for his universe hopping. Billie hands Dean the book containing the one fate that has Michael losing, leaving Dean in shock over what it reveals. Billie tells Dean that he must decide what to do with the information and disappears. In "Damaged Goods", Dean tells Sam that Billie revealed to him that the only way to stop Michael is for Dean to build a Ma'lak Box and trap himself and Michael for eternity. To this end, Billie has provided Dean with the instructions to build the box.

In "Moriah", after God kills Jack and begins the end of the world, Billie appears in the Empty with Jack and the Shadow.

In the Season 15 episode "The Trap", Billie visits the still-awake Jack in the Empty after the Winchesters choose not to seal God away after learning of the consequences to the world. Billie tells the young Nephilim that "it's time".

In "The Gamblers", Billie is revealed to have resurrected Jack and is guiding him in targeting Grigori, fallen angels that feed on the souls of innocent people. Jack later explains that Billie had kept him hidden in the Empty until God left Earth making it safe for Jack to be resurrected. Billie has provided Jack with a plan that will allow Jack to become strong enough to kill God himself.

In "Galaxy Brain", Billie is revealed to have been unable to restore Jack's soul when she resurrected him. She ignores Jack's prayers, instead assigning a reaper named Merle to watch over and control Jack. After Jack opens a rift to the Bad Place against her explicit instructions, Billie kills Merle and explains that God has been destroying all of the alternate universes and states that even God has a book detailing his ultimate fate in her library. Billie states that Jack, Sam and Dean are in the book which God cannot access without her permission, but refuses to explain further other than Sam and Dean's destiny is to be the messengers of God's destruction.

In "Destiny's Child", Billie reveals that God is almost done destroying other universes and will soon turn his attention back to their world. Billie assigns Jack another quest, this time one of a more spiritual nature. Billie instructs the Winchesters, Jack, and Castiel to find the Occultum, though she refuses to explain what it will do and does not know where to find it. When Castiel later enters the Empty to talk to Ruby, the Occultum's last owner, it is revealed that Billie and the Shadow are working together and as a result, Billie can resurrect Jack. Billie has promised the entity that once everything is over, she will send it back to sleep, something that it desperately wants. However, while torturing Castiel, the Shadow comments that Billie never mentioned needing Castiel for her plan. Jack ultimately fulfills his quest, causing the Occultum to restore Jack's lost soul.

In "Gimme Shelter", Jack reveals that Billie's plan to kill both Chuck and Amara, which involves turning Jack into a bomb that will cause God and the Darkness to cease to exist, will kill him as well.

In "Drag Me Away (From You)", Billie visits Dean and reveals that Chuck is done destroying alternate universes and will soon return. She has given Jack his final quest to prepare and according to the book, her role is now over until the end. Billie insists that Dean tell Sam the truth and he assures her that he is ready to enact the plan even if he does not like it.

In "Unity", Dean and Jack follow Billie's instructions and track down Adam who reveals that Billie has kept him alive for 300,000 years as he has been coming up with a plan to kill God; Billie has simply been helping Adam enact his plan. At the same time, Sam locates the Key to Death and enters Billie's library in search of her, only to find the Shadow who is also searching for Billie. To Sam's shock, the Shadow reveals that Billie's true plan is to take power as the new God once God and Amara are dead and will ensure that anyone who has been resurrected will die and that everyone from alternate universes will be returned to their own world – a death sentence since the other worlds are gone. Chuck admits to Amara that this is all part of his plan to get the Winchesters to kill each other, having goaded Billie. However, Sam talks Dean out of going through with the plan and an enraged God departs as Jack begins to detonate.

In "Despair", as the Winchesters and Castiel attempt to figure out how to help Jack, Billie appears in the bunker, enraged by their failure to kill Chuck and Amara. Though she cannot stop the detonation, Billie is able to teleport Jack to the Empty where he detonates instead, explaining that with God and Amara gone, only the Shadow can handle that kind of impact. Billie then admits that it is possible that Jack survived, pointing out that she only said it would be fatal, not that it would kill him. Castiel realizes that Chuck and Amara's death would have triggered a chain reaction. The group confront Billie over her lies and exploitation of them to which she admits and demands Chuck's death book back in exchange for bringing Jack back from the Empty. Sam reluctantly hands the book over. Billie brings Jack back, but tries to take him with her. Grabbing Death's Scythe, Dean slashes Billie in the shoulder, forcing her to flee without Jack, the book or the scythe. After their friends start dying, Dean decides to hunt Billie down, believing her to be responsible. After a brief skirmish, Billie reveals that Chuck was actually responsible. Mortally wounded by Dean's earlier attack, Billie chases Castiel and Dean in order to kill Dean before she dies. Realizing that only the Shadow, who has a grudge against Billie, can stop her, Castiel experiences a moment of true happiness by expressing his love for Dean, thus fulfilling his deal with the Shadow. The Shadow opens a portal to the Empty and sends two tendrils of darkness, one of which absorbs Billie, before both Billie and Castiel are dragged into the Empty.

=== Dumah ===
Dumah is an angel, portrayed by Erica Cerra, who is one of very few angels left alive by Season 13 and appears to hold a position of power amongst them.

Dumah first appears in "War of the Worlds" as Castiel's contact in Heaven with whom he meets about Jacks' disappearance. Dumah assures Castiel that Jack is not in the angels' custody and reveals that they want Jack because they see him as their only chance to make new angels. Dumah tells Castiel that angels are in danger of extinction and are willing to do anything to survive, including enslaving Jack. Dumah brings in two other angels to ambush Castiel, who fights back. The skirmish is interrupted by the surprise appearance of Lucifer, who scares off Dumah and the other two angels.

In "Devil's Bargain", Lucifer and Anael meet with Dumah and other angels outside the Heavenly Portal. Lucifer promises that if the angels bow to him as their leader, he can restore their wings and make new angels, claiming to know how as he witnessed God making angels. Dumah and the angels later bow to Lucifer in Heaven's Throne Room. Dumah subsequently appears in "Bring 'em Back Alive" and is ordered by Lucifer to dispatch angels to find his son. After a brief hesitation, she agrees.

In "Funeralia", Castiel returns to a Heaven experiencing power fluctuations. He is met by Dumah and a few other angels and requests their help, telling them that Gabriel is still alive, an alternate Michael is about to invade, Jack is trapped, and Lucifer is dangerous. As the power fluctuates around them, Dumah tells Castiel that they might be able to help each other, orders him to wait in the throne room and disappears. When she returns, Dumah tells Castiel that if he can find Gabriel and bring him back to Heaven, the angels can help him with everything else, such as finding Michael and defending Earth. When Castiel tells her that he needs her help to find them, Dumah admits that that is a problem. Castiel asks why Dumah cannot just send angels to search for Gabriel before Naomi appears and tells him that she and the other angels cannot. Naomi subsequently explains that fewer than a dozen angels are alive, including Castiel, Naomi, and Dumah. The low number of angels is causing power fluctuations in Heaven and if things do not change soon, the angels will burn out and Heaven will crumble. As a result, Naomi and Heaven's remaining angels cannot leave Heaven without risking it crumbling.

In "Byzantium", Castiel finds that Heaven has been invaded by the Cosmic Entity in search of Jack's soul. Castiel encounters an unconscious Dumah who wakes up and joins Castiel on his mission to find and resurrect Jack. After Castiel finds Jack, Dumah is revealed to be possessed by the Entity who uses her form to attack Castiel and make a deal with him. When the Entity departs Heaven, it leaves Dumah's body, leaving her with no apparent memory of her possession.

In "Absence", Castiel calls for Naomi after the death of Mary Winchester. Dumah will only tell him that Naomi is "indisposed", but confirms that Mary Winchester is dead and at peace in Heaven. To prove it, Dumah allows Castiel into Heaven where he witnesses Mary at peace in a Heaven shared with John Winchester.

In "Jack in the Box", Castiel returns to Heaven to seek Naomi's help in finding Jack. Dumah reveals that she has overthrown Naomi, pointing out that the Entity invaded Heaven under Naomi's watch and nearly killed all the angels. Though Dumah promises to help, she locates Jack and begins manipulating him for her own ends, creating a reign of terror wherein humans are beaten into submission, Heaven is stripped of all mercy and Jack acts to solidify Dumah's power. Dumah defends her actions as necessary to save Heaven, the angels and the world and states her intentions to guide Jack. When Castiel moves to take Jack and leave, Dumah stops him and threatens to use her new power over Heaven to end John and Mary's peaceful shared Heaven. Enraged, Castiel draws his angel blade and kills Dumah before she can react, leaving her body on the floor of Heaven as Castiel heads off after Jack. In "Moriah", Jack recognizes that Dumah had been using him when talking with Castiel.

=== Gabriel ===
Gabriel (also referred to as the Trickster or Loki) is an archangel portrayed by Richard Speight, Jr. Tiring of watching his brothers fight each other in Heaven, he fled to Earth thousands of years prior to the series, assuming the role of a Pagan trickster. For his first appearance in the Season 2 episode "Tall Tales", the writers decided not to put their own spin on trickster lore— as is usually done with other villains—keeping the "deadly sense of humor" and decision to go after the "high and mighty to bring them down a notch", with Gabriel causing violent urban legends to come to life on a college campus and punish the residents. Sam and Dean Winchester investigate and eventually figure out his identity, though the Trickster is waiting for them and offers a peaceful resolution so long as they let him leave to terrorize another town. Sam and Dean refuse, and attack him with the help of fellow hunter Bobby Singer, and the Trickster fakes his own death.

The Trickster reappears in the Season 3 episode "Mystery Spot", trapping Sam in a time loop where Dean ends up dying in many different ways. After over a hundred loops, Sam threatens the Trickster with a blood-covered stake, after which he agrees to break the loop. But when Sam considers killing him regardless, the Trickster sends the two to the next day where Dean once again dies, but is unable to be resurrected without the time loop. Months later, he calls Sam to him, where he tries to drive in a point: the two brothers continually sacrificing themselves for one another brings no good, and when people die, their survivors just have to cope. However, the Trickster gives Sam what he wants, lamenting that the whole situation had become boring months ago for him anyway.

In the Season 5 episode "Changing Channels", he lures the Winchesters to him with a case that makes it obvious he is involved. He traps Sam and Dean in an endless thread of television shows where they must play out their roles to survive, while ignoring their attempts at having him join them. Gabriel explains this is his way of getting them to accept their roles as vessels for Lucifer and Michael, respectively. In one of the scenarios, he banishes Castiel and is livid at a response about the Archangels. He is later stabbed with a stake, a move that kills other trickster spirits, however, he continues to put them in the shows. Dean and Sam trap him in a burning circle of holy oil, suspecting he is an angel because he survived staking, how he and Castiel interacted, and his anger at the insults of the Archangels. He then reveals that he is Gabriel, which does not surprise them. He explains he left Heaven because of conflict with his family. He even expresses his desire for the Winchesters to agree to become vessels since their lives mirror those of the angels. Dean forces him to bring Castiel back and frees Gabriel from his trap and accuses him of giving up because he is too afraid to stand up to his own family.

In "Hammer of the Gods", Gabriel attends the summit of pagan gods under the guise of Loki; however, he intends to rescue the brothers as their plan to lure Lucifer would easily fail, and Lucifer would slaughter them all. As he intends to prevent Kali, an old flame, from suffering a bloody fate, he tries to get them out; but he tells them rescuing the pagan's hostages would be too difficult. However, later he is forced to comply; the rescue attempt results in the brothers' recapture. Kali (who is keeping the brothers from leaving as their spilled blood binds them to her) reveals that she, along with the other gods, knew of his identity for a while. Kali takes his sword and stabs him with it, apparently killing him, but Gabriel appears to Dean and reveals the sword was a fake and suggests Dean should seduce Kali so they can escape. Lucifer shows up at the hotel, slaughtering most of the gods. Gabriel is forced to step in, allowing Kali and the brothers to leave. Gabriel confronts his brother about loyalties and their past, but ultimately fails and is killed by his own blade. He later reveals, through a modified porn movie, Lucifer can be reincarcerated in his previous prison, with the four rings of the Horsemen.

Gabriel returns in the Season 9 episode "Meta Fiction", where he reveals to Castiel that he has been in Heaven since he 'died'. However, when Heaven kicked all the angels out, Gabriel was forced to flee from Metatron. He tells Castiel that Metatron was using the Horn of Gabriel to trap and kill the angels and that he needs Castiel to help him fight. When the two are running, they stop at a gas station where they realize that some of Metatron's loyal subjects were following them. Gabriel offers to fight them off because he still has some of his Archangel powers left, but Castiel realizes that the whole situation is an illusion. Castiel then asks if Gabriel is really still alive, but all Gabriel does for an answer is raise his eyebrows before disappearing. Metatron says later that Gabriel played his part well.

In "We Happy Few", God confirms that Gabriel is dead when they discuss how the four archangels were required to help God defeat the Darkness the first time. God tells the Winchesters that while they have Lucifer fighting with them, Michael is in no shape to fight and Raphael and Gabriel are dead. When Dean reminds God that he has resurrected Castiel before, God tells him that he cannot resurrect the archangels so easily as they are beings of primordial creation. As a result, it will take far too much time to resurrect Gabriel and Raphael to help fight the Darkness.

In the Season 13 episode "Devil's Bargain", the Prince of Hell Asmodeus reveals to Arthur Ketch that he has gotten his hands on an Archangel Blade, the only known weapon that can kill an archangel. When Arthur reminds Asmodeus that the lore states that only an archangel can wield the blade, Asmodeus reveals that he has Gabriel, somehow still alive, as his prisoner. Gabriel is now in a beaten and bloody state with his mouth sewn shut.

In "The Thing", Arthur discovers that Asmodeus is injecting himself with Gabriel's grace to power up. Following a brutal beating by Asmodeus, Arthur rescues Gabriel and steals the archangel blade and Asmodeus' store of Gabriel's grace. Arthur brings the traumatized Gabriel to the Winchesters who are shocked to see the archangel whom they believed to be dead and learn of his captivity. Using Gabriel's extracted grace, the Winchesters are able to complete a ritual to open a door into an alternate reality that Dean passes through, leaving Sam and Gabriel behind.

In "Bring 'em Back Alive", Sam and Castiel attempt to treat the traumatized Gabriel who cringes away from all attempts to help him and appears unable to speak, even after the stitches holding his mouth shut are cut. Gabriel eventually writes his story on the wall in Enochian, revealing that he faked his death during the Apocalypse by tricking Lucifer into stabbing a duplicate of himself. Free of responsibility, Gabriel returned to a hedonistic lifestyle in Monte Carlo until he was captured and sold to Asmodeus. After a plea by Sam, Gabriel starts responding, but retreats into himself again after learning that Asmodeus knows where he is. When Asmodeus invades the bunker, Gabriel is recaptured, but snaps out of his traumatized state when Asmodeus starts torturing Sam and Castiel. Healing himself, Gabriel quickly kills Asmodeus. He is informed of the events that followed in his absence, but refuses to help further and departs the bunker. With the departure of Gabriel and the use of the last of his stored grace in an effort to heal him, the Winchesters are left without a way to reopen the door to Apocalypse World. They are also left without a powerful ally who could have helped them fight Michael.

During "Funeralia", Castiel visited Heaven and finds the other angels aware of Gabriel still being alive, to their surprise. Naomi tasked Castiel with retrieving Gabriel so that Heaven could properly fluctuate because of the low number of angels.

In "Unfinished Business", Gabriel seeks revenge on the pagan gods Loki, Fenrir, Narfi and Sleipnir. It Is revealed that millennia before, Gabriel rescued Loki and made a deal with him where Gabriel took on Loki's form and persona as The Trickster to go into "witness protection". Gabriel had sought Loki's help after faking his death only to have Loki betray him and sell Gabriel to Asmodeus. Low on grace and wounded, Gabriel arms himself with specially crafted wooden swords and seeks the help of the Winchesters after he is wounded and sense they were following him. In exchange for Gabriel helping them, the Winchesters agree to help Gabriel get revenge. With the help of the Winchesters, Gabriel kills Fenrir, Narfi and Slepnir before facing off with Loki (also played by Speight) who blames Gabriel for his father Odin's murder by Lucifer and wants revenge. Gabriel kills Loki and keeps his promise to return to the bunker with the Winchesters and joins their quest to stop Michael.

In "Beat the Devil", Gabriel gives up some of his archangel grace to complete the spell to open up the rift to Apocalypse World, but the spell fails. Gabriel and Rowena banter about where the fault over the spell's failure lies and Rowena flirts with Gabriel, leading them to have sex, much to the horror of the Winchesters. He then assists the Winchesters in their plan to capture Lucifer and use his grace to complete the spell. The plan succeeds and Gabriel travels with the Winchesters and Castiel to Apocalypse World. While traveling to find Mary and Jack, Castiel informs Gabriel of the precarious situation in Heaven, but Gabriel is reluctant to intervene. Sam is killed during a battle with a nest of vampires. The group then finds the human camp where Mary and Jack are, and Gabriel and Castiel work together to break the warding against angels so they can enter. After informing Mary and Jack of Sam's demise, Jack asks why Gabriel or Castiel did not revive him, but Gabriel tells him that they are not strong enough. Lucifer then enters the camp with a resurrected Sam.

In "Exodus", Gabriel interacts with his nephew and brother before he angrily disagrees with Lucifer's characterization of his and his family's history, telling Lucifer and Jack that Lucifer only plays the victim to excuse his evil deeds. That night, as Gabriel guards Lucifer, they argue and Gabriel compares Lucifer to a cancer cell, saying that God was right to cast him into the cage, which causes Lucifer become emotional and shed tears. Later, he helps the Winchesters and their allies evacuate Apocalypse World. The alternate version of Michael then appears, which shocks Gabriel. He watches as Lucifer is tossed aside and Michael turns to him, as Gabriel tells the Winchesters he is not running and decides to confront Michael. They then battle, but Michael overpowers and kills Gabriel with an archangel blade, to the Winchester's horror. The Winchesters use this as a distraction and retreat to their world. They inform Castiel of Gabriel's demise, which saddens him but he takes comfort in being told that he died a noble death in helping them all escape.

=== Gadreel ===
Gadreel is an angel portrayed by Tahmoh Penikett and Jared Padalecki. Gadreel was assigned to guard the Garden of Eden but was disgraced when Lucifer got in, which God and angels regarded as his fault. Gadreel was locked up in Heaven's deepest dungeon and tortured for his failure, but was released when Metatron's spell made all angels fall to Earth. Wanting to make up for his past, Gadreel answers Dean's prayers for help, taking on the identity of an angel named Ezekiel, who died in the Fall. When Gadreel's powers cannot heal Sam he proposes a solution: if he possesses Sam, he could heal him from the inside while recuperating from his own injuries from falling. Dean ultimately agrees and Gadreel invades Sam's mind, assuming Dean's form to manipulate Sam into consenting to angelic possession. Gadreel tells Dean that he will let Sam keep control of his body while he himself works in the background, but that it is best that Sam not know he is there. If Sam does not allow Gadreel to remain in his body, Sam could eject him and would die as a result. In the following episodes, Gadreel occasionally takes control of Sam's body in order to kill enemies when they get the better of Sam, to resurrect slain allies of Sam and Dean, and to heal injuries Sam gets on hunts. He regularly erases Sam's memory of these moments in attempt to keep Sam from getting suspicious. Gadreel is wary of Castiel's presence as he fears that the angels looking for Castiel might find him and force him to vacate Sam's body—and in doing so, consign Sam to die.

When Castiel turns up on a case in "Holy Terror", Gadreel once more forces Dean to send him away. In the same episode, he crosses paths with Metatron, who reveals his true identity and backstory and offers him a chance to "redeem" himself by becoming his second-in-command and helping him create a better Heaven. After discerning that Dean has learned from Castiel that he is not Ezekiel and has turned against him, now attempting to tell Sam the truth and get him to expel him, Gadreel murders Kevin and steals the tablets on Metatron's orders in a show of allegiance to the latter. In the following episode, "Road Trip", Metatron sends Gadreel to kill his former guard and torturer to please his new follower; when he finds out that Gadreel did not kill Dean, however, Gadreel is punished, forced to kill again, this time his friend Abner. He is then captured by Dean, Castiel, and Crowley, who learn his true identity when Crowley drives spikes through Gadreel's brain to revert him to his trance-like "factory settings" and an enraged Castiel reveals the cause of Gadreel's infamy to Dean. Gadreel then reverts to normal and tells them that he will not leave Sam's body, nor can they reach Sam, whom he has placed in a fantasy world unaware of what is really happening. With Crowley revealing the truth to Sam by possessing him to communicate with him, Gadreel and Sam fight briefly before Sam finally expels him. Gadreel continues working for Metatron, recruiting angels for their side in "Meta Fiction" and killing the ones who refuse. Gadreel is captured and interrogated by Sam and Dean, but refuses to provide any information and instead tries to push Dean into killing him, which fails as Dean knows they need Gadreel. Gadreel is saved when Metatron has them trade Gadreel for Castiel, whom he has captured.

In "King of the Damned", Gadreel meets with Castiel, who tries to persuade him that Metatron is using him and that he should work against Metatron, as Castiel's spy. Gadreel declines as he refuses to betray a cause he has dedicated himself to; Castiel is sympathetic and leaves his offer open. In the next episode, Gadreel discovers that Metatron is having his own angels—angels Gadreel himself had recruited—kill themselves and frame Castiel, causing him to lose his support, which proves to be the incentive he needed to turn on the cause. Gadreel offers his assistance to Castiel and the Winchesters; although Dean attacks him. Gadreel is saved by Sam and Castiel, who accept his help. In the finale, "Do You Believe in Miracles?", Gadreel and Castiel plot to sneak into Heaven using a Portal as the Gates are sealed and break Metatron's connection to the angel tablet, so that Metatron will revert to the powers and weaknesses of a normal angel and Dean can kill him with the First Blade. However, their scheme is already known to Metatron's angels, who trick them into Heaven's dungeon and imprison them. They cannot convince the angels to help them against Metatron, due to Gadreel's bad reputation. Hoping that he will be remembered as an angel who helped save Heaven instead of the one who let Lucifer into the Garden, Gadreel sacrifices himself by using the suicide bombers' sigil to destroy himself and the dungeon, thus freeing Castiel and in the process convincing Metatron's angel Hannah of his good intentions.

=== Hannah ===
Hannah, portrayed by Erica Carroll and Lee Majdoub in her female and male vessels, respectively, is one of the angels who fell from Heaven. She possesses a married woman named Caroline Johnson as her earth vessel. In the episode "Meta Fiction", Hannah and several other angels are lured by the Horn of Gabriel Sigil enchanted by Gadreel. She attempts to kill Castiel, who is also lured by the sigil, but fails and begs for her life. Joining Castiel, the two arrive at the sigil and meet Gadreel, who offers the two and other angels a chance to join Metatron. When Hannah and her friends refuse, Gadreel proceeds to kill nearly all angels in the area, but spares Hannah, who is healed by Castiel; it is later revealed that Metatron told Gadreel to spare Hannah so she could inform Castiel about what happened. Hannah becomes Castiel's second-in-command, helping him build an angel army in the war against Metatron. In "Stairway To Heaven", Hannah convinces Dean to civilly approach Tessa, who has been used by Metatron as a suicide bomber. She becomes furious when Dean apparently kills Tessa with the First Blade (though the latter actually committed suicide) and is further infuriated when she learns from Metatron's broadcast that Castiel had lied about his dwindling grace. Hannah and Castiel's other angel allies join Metatron's army when Castiel refuses to kill Dean in retribution for Tessa's death. During Castiel and Gadreel's arrival at Heaven to destroy Metatron's angel tablet in "Do You Believe In Miracles?", Hannah catches and locks them up in Heaven's prison. She refuses to believe that killing Metatron would restore the order, accusing Castiel and Gadreel of lying and selfishness, respectively. However, she becomes convinced when Gadreel kills himself to prove his fidelity to humans and joins Castiel in his insurgency against Metatron. Eventually, the two topple Metatron, who is imprisoned, though Hannah warns Castiel at the end that his dwindling grace would result in his death.

After Metatron's downfall, Hannah takes charge to return all the fallen angels back to Heaven. She contacts Castiel to help her in returning rogue angels Daniel and Adina, who have become content with life on Earth. Though Hannah fails to return the two with their death, Castiel decides to accompany her in her task. The two develop a romantic relationship, with Hannah becoming protective enough of Castiel that she suggests killing a rogue angel and feeding its grace to Castiel (he declines). However, when she encounters her vessel, Caroline's husband searching for his wife, Hannah realizes that Caroline deserves a chance to enjoy her mortal life. Deciding that she has enjoyed her time on Earth, Hannah releases Caroline of her grace, but not before kissing Castiel; inspired by her decision, Castiel contacts his vessel, Jimmy Novak's family.

After leaving her main vessel, Caroline, Hannah took a man as her new vessel. She blocks Sam and Castiel from entering Heaven to free Metatron, and when the two get around the plan with Bobby's help, she and several other angels corner Bobby to punish him. According to Metatron in "Book of the Damned", Hannah has been leading Heaven since his downfall and that it is the best it has been since the archangels' disappearances/deaths. In "Form and Void", Hannah saves Castiel from torture by two angels, but he soon realizes that it is a ruse so she can get information about the Winchesters from him. The two other angels attempt to "hack" Castiel's brain, discomforting Hannah. While the angels argue, Castiel falls under the influence of Rowena MacLeod's Attack Dog Spell again and breaks free. In the ensuing scuffle, Hannah is murdered by the angel Efram for her interference, but Castiel kills both Efram and his partner Jonah in turn.

=== Joshua ===
Joshua is an angel who is described as Heaven's gardener and is portrayed by Roger Aaron Brown and Paul Barton. Following God's departure from Heaven, Joshua is the only angel that God still speaks to, though Joshua himself clarifies that it is more that God talks to him, not that they hold a conversation, and he suggests that it is because he can relate "gardener to gardener".

Joshua first appears in the Season 5 episode "Dark Side of the Moon" where the Winchesters are instructed to find him by Castiel after they are murdered and end up in Heaven. Castiel sees Joshua as the best chance of finding God or at least of learning what God is saying due to the widespread knowledge of Joshua and God talking. The Winchesters efforts to find Joshua are interrupted by Zachariah who intends to torture them so that Dean will say "yes" to possession by the archangel Michael. However, Joshua appears to intervene, having been sent by God. Joshua is able to force Zachariah to back off and transports the Winchesters to Heaven's Garden. There, Joshua reveals that while God saved them when Lucifer rose and resurrected Castiel, He has no intention of doing so again and wants them to back off. Joshua expresses sympathy for their cause, telling them that he wishes he could do more "but I just trim the hedges". Joshua resurrects Sam and Dean and leaves their memories of their trip to Heaven intact on God's orders.

In the Season 12 episode "Somewhere Between Heaven and Hell", the angel Kelvin reveals to Castiel that Joshua has taken up a leadership role in the hunt for Lucifer's unborn Nephilim son. Kelvin proposes Castiel join the angels search, telling him that if he does, Joshua can get Castiel pardoned for his crimes. After warning the Winchesters about the Prince of Hell Dagon, Castiel travels to Heaven with Kelvin to meet with Joshua.

In "The Future", Castiel leads an attack to kill Dagon and Kelly Kline, the mother of Lucifer's child, with the Colt on Joshua's orders. The mission results in Kelvin's capture and the death of another angel, but Castiel cannot bring himself to outright kill Kelly and instead abducts her. Castiel is instructed by Joshua over "angel radio" to bring Kelly to the portal to Heaven as passage through it will kill both Kelly and her child. When the two arrive at the portal, Joshua himself emerges to greet them. However, he is combusted to dust moments later by Dagon. After killing Joshua, Dagon reveals that she had learned of their backup plan from Kelvin and laid in wait for hours to ambush the angels when they arrived at the portal.

=== Lucifer ===
Lucifer
- Supernatural character
- First appearance: "Lucifer Rising" (2009)
- Last appearance: "Inherit the Earth" (2020)
- Created by: Eric Kripke

In-universe information
- Full name: Helel (Birth Name); Lucifer (Chose Name)
- Species: Archangel
- Gender: Male
- Family: God (father/creator); Michael (twin brother); Raphael (brother); Gabriel (brother); Jack Kline (son)
- Duration: 2009–2012, 2015–2020

Lucifer, portrayed primarily by Mark Pellegrino, Jared Padalecki, Misha Collins, Rick Springfield and David Chisum, is the second oldest archangel, the first fallen angel, introduced as a recurring character in Season 5 of the series. From his prison in hell, he orchestrated events not only seen in Seasons 1 through 4, but decades prior, to eventually lead to his release by breaking the 66 seals. In the episode "Sin City", he was described as the 'father' and God of the demons, the one who gave them their form and purpose. Azazel reinforced this by referring to him as "My Father" while possessing a priest before slaughtering a convent of nuns. However, in "Abandon All Hope", Crowley remarks that Lucifer views demons with contempt and his cannon fodder and will destroy them once he has eliminated humanity.

In the episode "The End", Lucifer claims his fall was the result of refusing God's decree to love humans more than him. As a result, God had Michael cast him into hell. Ruby also reveals in "When the Levee Breaks" in defiance to God, he turned Lilith into the first demon. Both Death and Gabriel have compared Lucifer's hatred of humans to "one big temper tantrum" because God favored humans over him, his most beloved angel. Lucifer does not like how humans have changed the planet from its original state and hopes to purify it. He is also very critical of humans, mostly in how they blame him for their own mistakes, wrongdoings, flaws and failures. Creator Eric Kripke has jokingly compared him to a "raging psychotic" version of environmentalist Ed Begley Jr. with "unlimited power".

Due to his angelic and spiritual nature, Lucifer needs a human vessel in order to interact directly with the physical world. Lucifer seeks out a man named Nick, whose wife and baby had recently been murdered. As revealed in the Season 14 episode "Damaged Goods", Lucifer himself arranged for the murders through the demon Abraxas so that he could manipulate Nick. Tormenting Nick about the tragedy, he casts illusions such as a baby crying and blood pouring from the crib, eventually appearing to Nick in the form of his late wife Sarah. Openly admitting his identity to Nick, he tries to gain sympathy by telling Nick he was punished for loving God too much. He then convinces Nick to be his vessel by promising to get vengeance against God for allowing his family to be murdered. However, Lucifer later reveals to Sam that he is the true intended vessel. By "Abandon All Hope", it is shown Nick's body, being a temporary vessel and not his "true" vessel, is incapable of containing Lucifer's immense power and is beginning to wear down; revealed in "Two Minutes to Midnight" he has to consume gallons of demon blood to keep his vessel from combusting. He forms a ritual to summon Death and when the Winchesters, Harville's and Castiel arrive, he traps Castiel in holy oil and sends Meg after the others. After being ambushed by the brothers he is shot with the Colt but survives; he then reveals his status as one of five things in creation immune to the Colt; while the brothers escape with Castiel's help, he manages to summon Death and bind him under his control.

During a convention of pagan gods in "Hammer of the Gods", Lucifer is made aware of the brothers' location by Mercury, who betrays the rest of them. Slaughtering all the gods, he approaches the brothers and is stalled by Kali until Gabriel arrives. Gabriel provides safe passage for Kali and the brothers, and confronts Lucifer about his ultimate reason for rebellion, claiming that he rebelled not because he recognized that humans were flawed, but because he was no longer their father's favorite son. Lucifer questions Gabriel's loyalties, but he replies that he believes — by virtue of his experiences with them — humans, despite their flaws, strive to do their best. Ultimately, Lucifer kills Gabriel with his own sword when Gabriel's attempt to catch Lucifer off-guard with a duplicate fail, but he is clearly distraught over this.

Having acquired all four rings of the Horseman (which can trap Lucifer back in his prison), Sam and Dean enter Lucifer's hideout, planning to trap him when Sam agrees to be his vessel; this completely fails, as Lucifer is too powerful to fight. Lucifer brings forward four demons, who had been part of Azazel's surveillance of Sam since his youth and kills them all in a way of "letting off steam" and acquiring Sam's trust. Following that, he confronts Michael in a graveyard, attempting to convince him not to fight, reasoning there was no real purpose, Michael refuses. Dean interrupts, while Castiel dissipates Michael, an act Lucifer took unkindly to, and kills him. He starts to pummel Dean and when Bobby attempts to use the Colt to stop him he is killed as well. However, Sam then sees a toy army man in an ashtray of the Impala, a remnant from his youth, and regains control. Sam reopens the hole, and jumps in, taking Michael with him.

Lucifer returns in Season 7 as part of Sam's hallucinations, caused by the memories of his time in the cage. Lucifer tells Sam that the world he has been in for the last year is not real and Sam is still in the cage, a new form of torture which Lucifer prides himself on as being his best yet. Sam confronts Lucifer and asks him why he does not end this dream world to which Lucifer responds by saying that he will only end it when Sam cannot take it anymore. Lucifer later changes into Dean and tricks Sam into leaving Bobby's house. Once at the destination, he reveals himself to prove he can control Sam's "dream", although Lucifer is proven to be a hallucination when Dean tells Sam how to figure out what is real. Despite being proven to be a hallucination, he informs Sam that he is not going anywhere. Lucifer tortures Sam by depriving him of sleep by repeatedly waking him up and later making food look like maggots in an attempt to kill him. Although Sam initially manages to ignore the hallucination, it becomes worse when Sam acknowledges Lucifer's advice when trying to get information about Dean's whereabouts, giving the hallucination additional strength. Castiel, found to be alive, tries to rebuild Sam's mental wall, but fails as it is completely gone. In order to save Sam and atone for what he has done, Castiel transfers the problem to himself, leaving him haunted by Lucifer and stuck in a mental hospital. In "Reading is Fundamental", when Castiel comes out of his catatonic state, Sam asks him about seeing Lucifer. Castiel explains that he did at first, but Lucifer eventually disappeared. Castiel believes that Lucifer was simply a projection of Sam's own torment from his time in Hell and that projection disappeared as the torment was no longer in Sam's mind.

In the Season 8 episode "Goodbye Stranger", it is revealed that Lucifer had a series of crypts around the United States and possibly the world containing his most precious artifacts. The locations were only known to Lucifer himself and his most trusted followers, such as Azazel. Among the items in his crypts, in an angel-proofed box, was the angel Word of God tablet. Eventually Sam, Dean and Castiel locate the right crypt with the help of Meg who knows from her time with Azazel and get the angel tablet.

In the Season 10 episode "Brother's Keeper", Death explains that Lucifer and the other archangels once fought a war with an ancient evil called the Darkness, eventually locking it away. Lucifer was given the Mark of Cain, the lock on the Darkness' prison and the Mark corrupted him into his jealousy towards humanity, leading to his fall into evil. The first mention of Lucifer (and Michael)'s activity since their imprisonment in Hell is mentioned in "Out of the Darkness, Into the Fire" when an aide of Crowley informs him that ever since the Darkness broke free of its prison, the two archangels are screaming, trying to tell others about the danger the Darkness will pose to the world.

In "Oh Brother Where Art Thou?" and "The Devil in the Details", Sam travels into Hell to speak to Lucifer, directed by what he believes to be visions from God. Manifesting in the form of Nick, Lucifer is summoned into a smaller cage in Hell where he tells Sam he can defeat the Darkness, but needs Sam to be his vessel again. After the warding suddenly fails, Lucifer teleports Sam into the cage and reveals that he sent the visions to Sam after the Darkness' release damaged his cage and is working with Rowena. Lucifer shows Sam several memories, explaining that while Sam once had the strength to do what needed to be done, he lost that after Dean went to Purgatory. Sam accepts that Lucifer is telling the truth, but refuses to agree to possession again as he knows no matter who wins, Lucifer or the Darkness, humanity is doomed. Lucifer engages Sam, Dean and Castiel in battle, proving to be more than a match for all three together. After Lucifer confirms he can defeat the Darkness, Castiel agrees to possession by him. At that same moment, Rowena completes a spell that apparently banishes Lucifer back to his cage. After the Winchesters leave, Lucifer possessing Castiel reveals himself to Rowena and Crowley and kills Rowena so she cannot send him back to the cage.

In "Into the Mystic", Dean finds Lucifer looking through the bunker for a way to summon the Darkness and confides in him about his connection to Amara, believing Lucifer to be Castiel. Lucifer consoles Dean on the connection while secretly interested in this development.

In "The Vessel", Lucifer has regained control of Hell and keeps Crowley as his pet. After receiving a call from the Winchesters, he is shocked to discover that one of the Hands of God survived and agrees to transport Dean back to a submarine in 1943 to get it before the sub sinks. Special warding keeps Lucifer out of the sub and he and Sam attempt to find a way to remove the warding. Sam finds a spell, but does not believe it will work as it requires the power of an archangel. As Sam offers his soul to help give "Castiel" the power he needs, Lucifer reveals himself and attempts to destroy Sam. Castiel regains control temporarily, but is unable to eject Lucifer as it is taking all of his strength to keep Lucifer from killing Sam and only Lucifer has the power to rescue Dean. As Delphine Seydoux unleashes the power of the Hand of God, Lucifer pulls Dean back to the present and reveals himself to Dean. Lucifer throws Dean around the bunker and attempts to use the power of the Hand of God, but finds it expended. As Lucifer advances on Dean, Sam uses a blood sigil to banish him from the bunker.

Following his banishment, Lucifer attempts to find another Hand of God through Crowley in "Beyond the Mat". To this end, he sets Crowley up to be "freed" by Lucifer's loyal demon Simmonds so Crowley will lead him to another Hand of God. Crowley leads Lucifer to the Rod of Aaron but anticipates Lucifer's double-cross. Crowley attempts to kill Lucifer with the Rod's power, but Simmonds takes the brunt of the blast, saving Lucifer. Realizing the Rod's power is expended, Crowley quickly teleports away before Lucifer can kill him. In "Hell's Angel", Lucifer enters Heaven, killing an angel he finds there and intimidates the angels into following him to combat Amara. Amara unleashes a wave of darkness through Heaven, frightening the angels and pushing them closer to following Lucifer. However, the Winchesters, Crowley and the still-alive Rowena team up together to free Castiel and banish Lucifer back to his Cage. To this end, they summon him into warding in a church surrounded by Holy Fire. Once Lucifer is trapped, Dean attempts to use magic to suppress the archangel to restore Castiel, but Lucifer quickly overpowers it. In a desperate attempt, Crowley enters Castiel's vessel where he finds that Lucifer has "really gotten his hooks in good" to Castiel who is apathetic to everything around him even as Lucifer appears in the form of Nick and attacks Crowley. Sam exorcises Crowley to save his life and the warding breaks, releasing Lucifer. Lucifer is able to get the Horn of Joshua from the Winchesters, another Hand of God, just before Amara appears. Lucifer blasts Amara with both his own power and the Horn's to no avail. Amara then captures Lucifer and takes him to a grain silo she is using as her base. Believing Lucifer to be the one thing God still cares about, Amara begins torturing him in hopes of drawing God out.

Over the next few weeks, Amara tortures Lucifer mercilessly, trying and failing to draw out God. In "All in the Family", Amara notices that Lucifer is in bad shape along with Castiel and contacts Dean to pass on the message to God. Having learned that God intends to sacrifice Himself to Amara to save the universe, the Winchesters, Metatron and Prophet Donatello Redfern team up together to rescue Lucifer, hoping to convince God to use Lucifer in battle against Amara. As Dean distracts Amara, Sam, Metatron and Donatello find the heavily injured Lucifer who agrees to set aside his differences with God and fight Amara with them. They set him free, but he is too weakened to teleport them to safety. As Amara approaches, Metatron sacrifices himself to buy them time to get away, but Amara quickly catches up to them. Before she can kill the group, God teleports them and the Impala into the Bunker. There, for the first time in millennia, God and Lucifer are reunited. After commenting on how much each other has changed, God heals Lucifer's injuries to the fallen archangel's surprise.

In "We Happy Few", Lucifer sulks around the Bunker, displeased to be reunited with God who will not apologize to him. Fed up with the two's issues with each other, the Winchesters get God and Lucifer to have a sit-down in which things are tense at first but the two eventually reconcile. Now fully on their side, Lucifer joins God in explaining that the last time they defeated the Darkness, it had taken the four archangels and God to barely win and this time Michael is in no shape to battle and Gabriel and Raphael are dead and God cannot resurrect them. As a result, the Winchesters suggest pulling in the witches, angels and demons to help them. As God refuses to order the angels to help, Lucifer returns to Heaven where the angels refuse to hear him out. In response, Lucifer returns control to Castiel who tells the angels that Lucifer is burning both himself and his vessel out but he feels his role in the battle is to give Lucifer form on Earth to fight. Castiel and Lucifer are able to convince the angels to join them and Sam and Dean are able to convince the witches and demons respectively. After the witches, angels and demons strike Amara, she enters the warehouse where the Winchesters, God and Lucifer are waiting for her and Lucifer strikes Amara through the back with an angelic spear. Due to her weakened state, Lucifer's strike brings Amara down and she and God confront each other. However, God waits too long to transfer the Mark of Cain to Sam and Amara recovers and attacks God with all of her power. Lucifer attempts to save his father, but Amara flings him against a pillar and yanks him out of Castiel, while leaving Castiel unconscious. In "Alpha and Omega", Dean goes to check on Lucifer only to find Castiel alone. Castiel tells him that Lucifer is gone from his vessel, but he does not know what happened to the archangel after Amara pulled him out.

In "Keep Calm and Carry On", a weakened Lucifer searches for a suitable new vessel chased by Crowley but keeps burning out the people he is possessing. In "Mamma Mia", Lucifer settles on aging rock star Vince Vincente (Rick Springfield) and gains permission by posing as Vince's dead lover. With a new permanent vessel, Lucifer meets with Crowley who works with Rowena in an attempt to force Lucifer from Vince and back into the Cage. However, the effort fails, and Crowley flees while Lucifer captures Rowena. In The Foundry, Lucifer attempts to have Rowena make Vince a permanent vessel for him, but she betrays Lucifer and casts a spell that speeds up Vince's decay and banishes Lucifer to the bottom of the ocean. In "Rock Never Dies", a pair of amateur Satanists attempt to summon Lucifer who appears in the decaying body of Vince. Lucifer was actually summoned by one of his feathers they had and kills the Satanists then uses the feather to repair his vessel temporarily. Posing as Vince, Lucifer organizes a concert to murder a lot of people and is confronted by the Winchesters, Crowley and Castiel who are unable to defeat him. Lucifer explains to them that he feels that God only made up with him to defeat the Darkness and has abandoned him once more. Lucifer no longer has a plan except to destroy everything he wants and vacates Vince as his body burns out. In "LOTUS", Lucifer begins possessing people of influence, ultimately possessing President of the United States Jefferson Rooney. As the President, Lucifer sends the Secret Service after the Winchesters and engages in sex with Rooney's mistress Kelly, resulting in her becoming pregnant with his child. Crowley kidnaps Kelly who tricks Lucifer to a motel where the Winchesters, Castiel, Crowley and Rowena are waiting for him. After using a sigil to weaken Lucifer, Sam activates a device created by the British Men of Letters that can exorcise any angel or demon from their vessel. Despite Lucifer's attempts to resist, he is exorcised from Rooney and Rowena casts a spell that apparently returns Lucifer to his cage.

At SDCC 2016, it was affirmed that all Lucifer wants is a "vacation", being tired after ruling both Heaven and Hell, and happy that he finally reconciled with his father.

It is soon revealed that Lucifer was not banished back to the Cage but was actually transferred back into Nick; Crowley retrieved Nick's corpse and had a team of demons' 'repair' him, turning Nick into a new Cage where Lucifer cannot leave his vessel and can only use his powers on Crowley's orders. Lucifer is eventually able to turn the tables on Crowley and escape his captivity (although he is still apparently trapped in Nick), with the Winchesters' attempts to stop him banishing him to a parallel universe where the Apocalypse took place because Dean and Sam were never born, although Lucifer is confronted by Crowley who kills himself to trap him, he is able to kill Castiel and take Mary with him. While the Winchesters try to 'raise' Lucifer's son Jack- who grew to adulthood immediately after birth-, Jack is able to help Castiel come back to life, but Lucifer remains in the other world and alerts the alternate Michael to his existence, prompting him to fight alt-Michael but he is defeated. While imprisoned, Alt-Michael drains his powers and tells him of his plans to travel to the 'prime' universe to conquer it as well. Faced with this threat, Lucifer uses a ritual performed by Michael to return to his world to warn them about Michael, but Castiel initially disbelieves him before they are captured by Asmodeus though escape. Lucifer takes control of Heaven since there are too few angels to mount an effective resistance to Michael. Later, he abandons it to find his son and has no luck.

During "Beat the Devil", he drowns his sorrows before he is captured again but by Gabriel and Rowena who survived his attempts on their lives. His grace is used to power the rift and keep it open. Lucifer learns from a taunting Rowena his son is in that world and breaks free. Lucifer's attempt on her life ends up sending him to Apocalypse World where he resurrects Sam who was killed by vampires, having used the grace of Michael's soldiers to refuel himself. He forces Sam to help him form a bond with his son. Lucifer met his son for the first time.

During "Exodus", Lucifer bonds with Jack and is reluctantly allowed to join the team, revealing that they have thirty-one hours before the rift closes again and killing six attacking angels. During this time, Lucifer's efforts to paint himself in a better light are rebuffed by Gabriel who compares his older brother to a cancer that God had to cut out to protect humanity, but too late. Gabriel's words reduce Lucifer to silent tears. Lucifer later works with Dean to repair an old bus and then drives the bus full of refugees back to the rift. When Michael appears and attacks during the exodus through the rift, Lucifer attacks him, but is easily beaten. Following Gabriel's death at Michael's hands, an injured and weakened Lucifer tries to follow Sam through the rift but is thrown to the ground by the younger Winchester and abandoned to die. With the rift closed, Lucifer makes a deal with Michael to share the spell to reopen it in exchange for Lucifer getting to take Jack while Michael gets everything else.

In the Season 13 finale "Let the Good Times Roll", Lucifer reappears in the Winchesters' universe and entices Jack to leave for the stars with him. At the request of Jack, Lucifer resurrects his friend Maggie who subsequently identifies Lucifer as her killer. During a confrontation with Michael, Lucifer's deal with the other archangel is revealed as is his murder of Maggie. Lucifer is forced to admit the truth by Jack who rejects his father after seeing his true nature. Enraged, Lucifer absorbs his son's grace to become more powerful than ever. With Lucifer virtually unstoppable and poised to destroy everything, Dean agrees to become the vessel of the alternate Michael on the condition that Michael power him to battle Lucifer. Powered by Michael, Dean battles Lucifer who still proves to be more than a match for Dean. However, as Lucifer tries to smite Dean, Sam is able to toss Dean the Archangel Blade, the one weapon that can kill an archangel. Armed with the blade, Dean is able to finally kill Lucifer by stabbing him in the heart. However, in the aftermath of Lucifer's death, Michael betrays his deal with Dean, takes full control of him and disappears.

In the Season 14 episode "Stranger in a Strange Land", Lucifer's vessel Nick is revealed to have survived Lucifer's death. Nick has nightmares and flashbacks to his time as Lucifer's vessel and a slowly healing wound in his side where Lucifer was stabbed. Sam and Mary both have trouble looking at Nick due to his time under Lucifer's control, but he is able to tell Sam that Michael had told Lucifer that he wants to "do it right this time" when discussing his plans for the Winchesters' world. Nick subsequently shows Lucifer-like behaviors when angered in "Gods and Monsters", causing Castiel to suspect that Lucifer did more damage to Nick's psyche than was previously realized.

In "Unhuman Nature", Nick's bloody quest for revenge leads to him becoming a serial killer. After killing Frank Kellogg, the man who was possessed by the demon Abraxas when Abraxas murdered his family, Nick prays to Lucifer, having realized that he enjoyed being the archangel's vessel and the freedom that came with it. In response to Nick's prayer, a figure with glowing red eyes rises in the Empty, presumably Lucifer himself, somehow awakened from his eternal sleep by Nick's prayer.

In "Damaged Goods", Nick manages to track down the demon Abraxas who murdered his family. During a confrontation, Abraxas reveals to a shocked Nick that it was in fact Lucifer himself who ordered the death of Nick's family at Abraxas's hands. Abraxas tells Nick that while he was chosen, Nick was nothing special and that "we threw a dart at the phone book" to choose Nick. The enraged Nick then kills Abraxas with an angel blade in revenge for his family's murders. During the confrontation, despite previously being loyal to Lucifer, the demon shows no real care that Lucifer is dead, simply responding that it is "cool" when Nick tells Abraxas who is also amused that Nick is no longer under the control of Lucifer.

In "Prophet and Loss", Nick begins seeking out Lucifer to reunite with him. In "Game Night", Nick kidnaps prophet Donatello Redfield and boosting Donatello's abilities with angel grace, communicates with the awakened Lucifer in the Empty. Lucifer provides Nick with a way to resurrect him using his son's blood. Nick succeeds in getting the blood and performs the spell, opening a portal to the Empty from which Lucifer emerges in the form of a viscous black humanoid figure with wings. However, Jack arrives with Mary Winchester, kills Nick and banishes Lucifer back to the Empty.

In "Absence" and "Jack in the Box", Jack is haunted by a hallucination of Lucifer, the form that his subconscious takes after Jack accidentally kills Mary.

In the Season 15 episode "Proverbs 17:3", Sam experiences a vision, part of a series of nightmares he has been having, featuring Lucifer possessing him and wearing a white suit much as Lucifer did in "The End". Dean attempts to kill the archangel with the Colt, but Lucifer is unharmed by the shot and burns Dean to death after stating that they both always knew it had to end this way. Sam later comes to the conclusion that he is witnessing Chuck's possible endings for them. In "The Trap", this is revealed to be the Lucifer of an alternate reality with Chuck explaining that what Sam actually witnessed were Chuck's memories of alternate Sam's and Deans.

In the series' penultimate episode "Inherit Earth", a resurrected Lucifer appears at the bunker, claiming that the Shadow brought him back to help the Winchesters defeat God. As proof, Lucifer kills Betty, a reaper, so that she will become the new Death and can read Chuck's Death book. However, once Betty has the book open, Lucifer kills her and reveals that it was actually God who brought him back to get the book and that Lucifer is God's new favorite. Lucifer engages in a brief battle with Michael that ends when Michael manages to kill Lucifer with an Archangel Blade that Sam provides him. This time, Lucifer explodes into ash and leaves no remains behind. Sam and Dean later explain to Chuck that Jack absorbed the power from Michael and Lucifer's battle and Lucifer's second death and that Michael's reaction to Lucifer's claims allowed them to put their ultimate plan together.

A homage to John Milton's Paradise Lost, Lucifer will be portrayed as "gentle, almost sympathetic". Kripke reasoned, "He was essentially betrayed, so in some ways he can be viewed sympathetically ... if we can make the angels dicks, Lucifer can be sympathetic". Kripke further characterized him as a "Devil who has doubt" and "a lot of affection for God and the angels", and who "speaks really tenderly and gently and...doesn't lie".

Pellegrino was the second choice to play the angel Castiel, losing the role to Misha Collins.

=== Metatron ===
Metatron, portrayed by Curtis Armstrong, is the angel who wrote the Word of God tablets. According to the demon tablet, he is an Archangel, but Metatron claims to be an angel from the secretarial division who was enlisted by God to write the tablets before he left Heaven. God later claims that he had no special reason to choose Metatron and that Metatron was just the closest angel to the door when he walked in. When God left and the Archangels decided to take over, Metatron left Heaven and hid on Earth to protect himself and the tablets because he rightly assumed that the Archangels would need him to fulfil their plans. On Earth, Metatron lived among a Native American tribe known as The Two Rivers to whom he gave immortality in exchange for stories and books. Metatron became enamored by human stories and even though he read as much as an angel could, he was not able to read every story written during his millennia on Earth.

Sam and Dean learn of Metatron when they uncover the Leviathan Word of God tablet and Castiel reveals that Metatron wrote them. Dean considers looking for him for help with the Leviathans. Later, Kevin Tran finds a personal note Metatron left on the demon tablet revealing the existence of a compendium of tablets. While trying to find the third trial to close Hell, Sam and Dean track down Metatron and confront him. Metatron initially refuses to help, but after they reveal the story of Kevin Tran, Metatron rescues him from Crowley and heals him. Metatron now knows what is going on in Heaven and the world and agrees to help. Along with Kevin, Metaton reveals the third trial: curing a demon. He suggests to Dean that he needs to consider the impact that closing Hell will have on the world. Metatron later approaches Castiel for help in dealing with the problems in Heaven. Heaven has degenerated into factional war and Metatron wants to isolate it. As the Scribe of God, he knows the three trials without the angel tablet, but wants Castiel to undertake them. The two attempt the first trial, which is to kill a Nephilim and cut out their heart. Though Castiel hesitates, when the Nephilim overpowers both them both, he kills her from behind while she is distracted with Metatron. In "Sacrifice", Metatron reveals that the second trial is to get the bow of a Cupid and as he works with Castiel on the task, Naomi captures him. Metatron recognizes Naomi as the angel who was supposed to "debrief" him for the Archangels after God left, although the real purpose was to lean his secrets. Suspicious of why Metatron has come out of hiding, Naomi tortures him and is shocked to learn that he actually intends to expel all angels from Heaven (except himself) as revenge for his own expulsion. Naomi warns Dean and Castiel, but while she is gone, Metatron breaks free and kills Naomi when she returns. He captures Castiel and takes his grace as the final component needed for his spell. He sends Castiel to Earth to live a human life after asking Castiel to find him and tell him about it when he one day dies. Metatron's plan works and all angels are expelled from Heaven. Sam and Dean learn in "Heaven Can't Wait" that Metatron designed the spell to be irreversible apparently leaving no way to return the angels to Heaven.

Metatron reappears on Earth in "Holy Terror" during the struggle of the angel factions to wrest control and decide the best course to retake and re-enter Heaven. He convinces Gadreel to join him in refashioning the angels' purpose in existence, resulting in Kevin Tran's death and Gadreel's controlling Sam's body.

In "Road Trip", he employs Gadreel as his assassin, sending him to kill angel guard Thaddeus and Gadreel's friend Abner, presumably as a further test of his loyalty. He is annoyed when Gadreel does not kill Dean and questions his orders. Metatron waits for Gadreel to return from killing Abner with Gadreel's former vessel and is surprised when Gadreel suddenly appears in his natural form and repossesses his old vessel. Realizing that Sam has expelled Gadreel, an amused Metatron asks if Gadreel had Winchester troubles. After getting the tablets, Metatron connects himself to the angel tablet, granting him God-like power. Continuing his efforts with Gadreel's help, Metatron recruits a following and begins writing his own "story". To this end he captures Castiel during "Meta Fiction" and asks him to be the villain in the story in exchange for an unlimited supply of grace as his stolen grace is burning out. Castiel refuses and Metatron is forced to trade Castiel for Gadreel after Sam and Dean capture the latter. With his new powers, Metatron proves immune to their efforts to trap him. He lets them go as he does not see them as a threat.

Following this, Castiel gathers his own following to battle Metatron. Metatron has Gadreel eliminate other angels who could threaten him. As Castiel's following grows stronger than his own, Metatron uses brainwashed suicide bombers in "Stairway to Heaven" to convince the other angels not to follow Castiel. Metatron offers the angels a return to Heaven through a moving portal he has created in return for their fealty. After Castiel refuses to kill Dean for supposedly killing the reaper Tessa, Castiel's followers abandon him for Metatron. However, this backfires on Metatron because his methods cause Gadreel to switch sides, too.

During "Do You Believe In Miracles?", after broadcasting to all angels over "angel radio", Metatron heads to Earth to convert humanity to follow him instead of God by performing miracles, including raising the dead. Dean, armed with the First Blade and powered by the Mark of Cain, confronts Metatron as Castiel and Gadreel try to break into Heaven and shatter Metatron's power. With his new power, Metatron mortally wounds Dean. However, before he can finish the job, Gadreel's sacrifice allows Castiel to shatter the angel tablet and obliterate Metatron's incredible power, forcing him to flee Sam's attack. In Heaven, Metatron binds Castiel and taunts him about how the angels are sheep who will follow him and how he cares nothing for them. However, Castiel had secretly activated the broadcasting equipment in Metatron's office, broadcast these comments to all angels. Metatron's followers turn on and overpower him, but Castiel locks him in Heaven's dungeon rather than kill him. His killing of Dean causes him to resurrect as a demon.

In "Reichenbach", Hannah approaches Metatron to see if he has any of Castiel's grace left in hopes of saving him from dying when his stolen grace burns out. Metatron claims there is some left and offers to hand it over in exchange for his freedom, claiming that he will leave the planet if set free. Castiel refuses and Metatron reveals that he really plans to get revenge once he escapes, though he claims there is some grace left. In "The Hunter Games", hoping that Metatron knows of a cure to the Mark, Castiel has him brought to Earth where he and the Winchesters question him for information. Metatron claims there is a cure to the Mark and that it requires the First Blade, but when Dean demands the rest, he reveals that there is a lot of steps and he wants something for each one. Dean tortures Metatron who continues to taunt him into giving in to the Mark's rage, but he is stopped by Castiel and Sam before he can kill him. Castiel returns Metatron to Heaven for safety with Metatron saying that he will choose death over helping again. However, he leaves a possible clue: "behold, the river shall end at the source". In "Inside Man", desperate to find a cure for Dean's deteriorating condition, Sam, Castiel and Bobby Singer plot to break Metatron out of prison when the angels refuse to release him to their custody for fear of what he will do if released. On Earth, Metatron taunts them with his leverage over them until Castiel removes his grace, leaving Metatron human and mortal. After Sam shoots him in the leg and Castiel threatens his life, Metatron quickly gives in and admits that he knows of no cure for the Mark, stating that it is God-level or Lucifer-level power and he knows nothing and that not even the tablets contain information on the Mark. Castiel is able to tell that Metatron is telling the truth, but before Sam can kill him, Metatron tells them that he was telling the truth about there being some of Castiel's grace left and offers to lead him to it in exchange for his life. Castiel reluctantly agrees and sets off in search of his grace with Metatron. In "Book of the Damned", Metatron and Castiel go on a road trip to find Castiel's grace. Metatron starts to embrace his new humanity, annoying Castiel with his antics and leading to Metatron getting punched. At a diner, they come under attack by an angry Cupid and Metatron kills him to save Castiel but fails to endear himself to Castiel with his actions. Finally, the two come to a library where Metatron reveals he had another angel hide the grace and leave him clues so no one else could find it or torture the information from him. Searching through the books for one with the title "what's the most insane thing a man can do?", Metatron engages Castiel in a conversation, asking him what he will do once he tracks down the remaining rogue angels as Hannah has restored order to Heaven. While Castiel is distracted, Metatron uses his blood to cast a spell that stuns Castiel and retrieves the demon tablet, what he had really come for. However, he discovers that Castiel has found his grace in a copy of Don Quixote and quickly leaves before he can recover. Castiel gets his grace back and is restored to full power, but he and Sam are left worried by what Metatron can do with the demon tablet despite now being human. They also lie to Dean about how Castiel got his grace back, telling him that Hannah got it out of Metatron and not mentioning his escape. It is later mentioned he got away by stealing Castiel's car.

In "Out of the Darkness, Into the Fire" and "Into the Void", the other angels search for Metatron to reimprison him, while in "The Bad Seed", the Winchesters and Castiel join the search hoping he has information on The Darkness. To their surprise, they can find no incidents with Castiel's car that indicate that Metatron was in a crash, surprising Castiel as he did not expect a former angel and shut-in to be a good driver. In "Our Little World", Castiel spots Metatron's reflection in a photo of a murder on the news, revealing that Metatron has become a videographer. Castiel tracks Metatron down at the scene of a shooting where Metatron steals the victim's money and bemoans his lack of power that he would not have used to help the man anyway. After healing the man and breaking Metatron's camera, Castiel drags him to an abandoned warehouse where Metatron tells him he has come to see reality as literature and himself as the "author of reality" as a videographer. Metatron lies about the location of the demon tablet, but Castiel has already found it by searching Metatron's apartment where he had hidden it under his mattress. Castiel demands information on the Darkness, but Metatron refuses to spill and taunts him into attacking Metatron. Castiel stops when he realizes that Metatron wants to die and Metatron explains that he cannot stand life as a human. He finally tells Castiel that the Darkness is God's sister who He had to give up to form creation. Castiel lets Metatron go, telling Sam and Dean that he is now just a pitiful human and is no threat. If Metatron draws any sort of attention to himself, the angels will descend on him and destroy him.

In "Don't Call Me Shurley", Metatron is living as a homeless vagrant, but has gained a more compassionate nature as demonstrated by his feeding a stray dog rather than eating it food he had scavenged himself. Metatron and his dog are transported to a bar where Metatron meets with Prophet Chuck Shurley who reveals himself to be God. God does not punish Metatron for his rogue actions, though He also refuses to reinstate him as an angel, something Metatron admits is probably for the best. Instead, God asks Metatron to help Him write His autobiography. Metatron helps God but is stunned by how apathetic God has become to the world and the situation with Amara. After learning that Amara has infected a town with insanity, Metatron pleads with God to help, now understanding that humanity is God's greatest creation and is better than God because although humans have many flaws, they still try. God apparently refuses to listen, but Metatron reads the end of his autobiography and is shocked by what he reads while God intervenes to stop Amara's infection and to save the Winchesters.

In "All in the Family", Metatron contacts the Winchesters and warns them that God intends to sacrifice himself to Amara in an attempt to save the universe. Wanting to do what he can to save God and humanity, Metatron offers to help the Winchesters and joins Sam and the Prophet Donatello in a rescue mission for Lucifer. As Sam and Lucifer discuss the situation, Metatron casts a spell to release Lucifer from his bindings, but Lucifer is incapable of teleporting them to safety. As Amara approaches, Sam, Lucifer and Donatello flee, but Metatron stays behind to buy them time. Metatron unsuccessfully uses an angel banishing sigil, amusing Amara. He asks her to spare the universe as God had only meant well. Telling Metatron "spare this", Amara surrounds Metatron in darkness and reduces him to nothingness. After he is informed of Metatron's death, Dean is surprised that Metatron sacrificed himself for them.

=== Michael ===
Michael is the oldest and most powerful Archangel, featured in Season 5. In the season premiere, Zachariah reveals the angels' plan for Michael to use Dean as his vessel and kill Lucifer. However, Dean needs to consent to be the vessel. Michael first appears when Sam, Dean, and Castiel have traveled back to 1977 to stop Anna from killing John and Mary in order to prevent Sam's birth, and thus his use as Lucifer's vessel. Michael refers to Lucifer as his younger brother. When Lucifer refused God's command to bow before humanity, he turned to Michael for support, but was rejected. On God's command, Michael cast Lucifer into Hell. When the angels develop a new plan to lure Dean into consenting in "Point of No Return", the angels bring back Adam, John Winchester's third son, under the pretense that he can be Michael's new vessel, but this is merely a ruse to get Dean to say yes. Zachariah tortures Sam and Adam until Dean consents. Zachariah then summons Michael from Heaven, but Dean changes his mind, kills Zachariah and attempts to escape. Adam is inadvertently locked inside while Michael descends, and the room and Adam disappear. In "Two Minutes to Midnight", Castiel confirmed that now Michael is taking Adam as his vessel. During the episode "Swan Song", Michael appears with Adam as his vessel in order to fight Lucifer, but gets interrupted by Dean, Bobby, and Castiel, who delay him by sending him away with holy fire. In a couple of minutes he returns to see Sam, who has taken control over Lucifer, ready to jump in the pit, and tries to stop him, claiming his destiny is to fight his brother. As Sam denies, Michael makes a final desperate effort to hold him, but is swept along by Sam and they fall into the abyss together. Castiel believes that he and Lucifer tortured Sam's soul in the cage until it was removed by Death, one of the horsemen. Michael's first mention of activity since his imprisonment in Hell is mentioned in "Out of the Darkness, Into the Fire", in which an aide of Crowley informs him that Michael is wailing, trying to tell others about the danger the Darkness, which recently broke free from its prison, will pose to the world. In "The Devil in the Details", Lucifer tells Sam that "prison life" has not agreed with Michael and indicates that Michael's time in the Cage has driven him insane. When talking about their coming battle with the Darkness, God echoes this, telling the Winchesters that Michael is in no shape to fight a battle.

In the Season 15 episode "Back and to the Future", the demon Belphegor tells Dean that every door in Hell was opened by God, including that of Lucifer's Cage. Dean asks about Michael and Belphegor tells Dean that last he heard, Michael was sitting in the Cage. However, Belphegor suggests that if Michael does get out, he will want revenge.

In "Our Father, Who Aren't In Heaven", the Winchesters and Castiel learn from the demon tablet that God has a secret weakness that he shared only with his favorite. Suspecting this to be Michael, they travel into Hell to speak with him. Dean suspects that God and Lucifer had lied about Michael's insanity. However, by this point, Michael has already escaped from both the Cage and Hell and returned to Earth where, in the body of Adam Milligan, he shares control with his vessel. With the other archangels dead and God gone, Michael decides to start life with Adam on Earth, dispatching Lilith when the demon arrives to take him to God. After Castiel prays to him, Michael agrees to meet with his brother, though he is not pleased to see the other angel given Castiel's role in his imprisonment. The Winchesters and Castiel take Michael captive and attempt to convince him that God is the threat and they need Michael's help to stop him. Adam reveals that he and Michael reached an understanding in the Cage. Michael refuses to listen as it would mean God's Favorite Son doubting him. In a final effort, Castiel shows Michael his memories of God's betrayals, including the battle with the Darkness, the murder of Jack and Apocalypse World Michael. Disillusioned, Michael provides Castiel and Dean with the spell to trap God but warns that it requires a flower that only grows in Purgatory. Michael opens a twelve-hour portal for them to Purgatory but refuses to stay and help. Dean releases the archangel, who allows Adam to take control again so that Dean can apologize to his brother before Adam and Michael leave.

In "Inherit Earth", the Winchesters and Jack find Michael on an otherwise empty Earth. Michael reveals that Adam was killed when God wiped out everyone else. He says he was shocked to learn many humans loved God. Michael then reveals this to be the result of him having angels and prophets describe his father as loving and caring. He then agrees to help them against God. However, not even Michael can open Chuck's Death book. Shortly afterwards, Michael is enraged by the presence of a resurrected Lucifer who eventually reveals that God brought him back to get the book and that Michael is no longer God's favorite. Michael and Lucifer engage in a brief battle that ends with Michael killing his brother with an Archangel Blade that Sam provided. Michael joins the Winchesters and Jack in their plan to use a spell from the Book of the Damned to kill God but betrays them in an effort to become his father's favorite once again. He reunites with his father for the first time in milienia and the latter thanks him for his warning. However, Chuck is enraged that Michael betrayed him earlier and effortlessly obliterates the protesting archangel, rendering Archangels extinct. Sam and Dean reveal that they had earlier anticipated Michael's betrayal and used Michael to lure Chuck into a trap for their real plan.

==== Apocalypse World Michael ====
In Season 13, an alternate reality version of Michael is depicted in Apocalypse World, portrayed by Christian Keyes, Ruth Connell and Jensen Ackles. This version of Michael won the Apocalypse when it occurred, killing that version of Lucifer. A twisted and corrupt version of what he once was, Michael rules Apocalypse World with an iron fist and is conducting genocide upon the human race. Lucifer calls this Michael "pure evil". More powerful than the Michael the Winchesters are used to, he captures Lucifer and Mary Winchester and tortures them. Learning of the Winchesters' world, Michael intends to lead an invasion to destroy the human population and take over that world. An attempt to open a door between the worlds with the help of the prophet Kevin Tran allows Lucifer to escape to his own world with his grace diminished after some of it was used by Michael as a power source for the portal. From Lucifer, Castiel learns of Michael's impending invasion and warns the Winchesters, while Asmodeus, the current ruler of Hell, learns of it as well and begins preparing by getting the Archangel Blade, the only weapon that can kill an archangel such as Michael or Lucifer. An attempt by the Winchesters to open another door between the worlds leads to Michael capturing the Nephilim Jack, who is powerful enough to open the door for him. Jack eventually escapes with Mary Winchester. Zachariah's attempt to recapture him leads to Zachariah's death. Seeing the state of Apocalypse World, Mary and Jack form a resistance against Michael with the intention of killing him to save both worlds. As the war continues, Michael compels the prophet Kevin Tran to try a suicide bombing against the resistance in a somewhat successful effort to break Jack's spirit by showing Jack that he cannot save everyone.

In the penultimate episode of Season 13 "Exodus", the Winchesters return to Apocalypse World with Lucifer and Gabriel in an effort to rescue Mary and Jack. With Mary unwilling to leave the people behind, the Winchesters lead an exodus through the rift back to their universe. However, Michael interrupts the exodus, hoping to preventing their escape and use the rift to reach their world. The Winchesters were shocked to finally meet him and Lucifer engages him in a rematch, in which Michael overpowers him. Though surprised to see Gabriel, Michael does not hesitate to engage his younger brother, quickly overpowering Gabriel and killing him with an Archangel Blade. Gabriel's sacrifice enables the Winchesters to escape, leaving Michael stuck in Apocalypse World with Lucifer when the rift closes moments before Michael can reach it. Lucifer subsequently offers Michael a deal where he will share the spell to reopen the rift and in exchange, he and Michael will travel to the Winchesters' world together where Lucifer will get his son and Michael will get the chance to conquer everything else.

In the Season 13 finale "Let the Good Times Roll", Michael unexpectedly attacks the Winchesters in a gas station near their bunker, having arrived in their world with Lucifer. Dean manages to hold Michael at bay long enough to escape with holy fire, but Michael soon breaks free and attacks the Winchesters' bunker, easily defeating all resistance while preparing to kill Dean. Sam is able to summon Jack for help through a prayer. Jack attacks Michael, seriously injuring him. Before Jack can kill Michael, Lucifer's evil deeds are revealed to his son. Lucifer steals Jack's grace and departs with Jack and Sam. In the aftermath, a weakened Michael warns Dean and Castiel that Lucifer is now "super-charged" and can destroy the universe if he wishes. While Michael once had the power to stop him, he is too weak to do so, particularly in his injured state, with a battered vessel. Desperate to stop Lucifer, Dean remembers that he is the Michael Sword, Michael's one true vessel with whom Michael will become more powerful than ever. With Michael acknowledging that by working together, he and Dean would have a chance against Lucifer, Dean offers Michael a deal where he becomes Michael's vessel, but Dean will remain in control while Michael powers him. Michael consents and gains Dean as his vessel. With Michael powering him from within, Dean gains access to the archangel's teleportation, strength, invulnerability and flight capabilities, allowing him to fight Lucifer on a more even level and ultimately kill him with Michael's Archangel Blade. With Lucifer dead, Michael breaks his deal with Dean, takes full control of his body and departs, loose upon the Winchesters' world in his true vessel.

In the Season 14 episode "Stranger in a Strange Land", three weeks after possessing Dean, Michael travels around asking "what do you want?" while trying to figure out the answer for himself. In the end, Michael forms an alliance with monsters, because he sees them as pure - all they want to do is feed.

In "Gods and Monsters", Michael performs experiments using angel grace to enhance the monsters' powers. After several misfires, Michael perfects his methods and begins building an army of enhanced monsters loyal to him by making a deal with a werewolf pack leader. Dean briefly surfaces in a mirror and unsuccessfully attempts to order Michael out of his body. Michael baits a trap for Sam, Mary and Bobby Singer using a vampire he had purposefully let escape. Michael's enhanced werewolves, who are immune to silver, attack the hunters, who are caught off-guard, but kill the monsters through decapitation. Moments later, Dean arrives with Michael mysteriously gone from his body. Dean tells the others that Michael left his body on his own and he has no idea why.

In "The Scar", Dean has Castiel go through his memory in hopes of learning what happened to Michael, after finding a scar upon his arm. Castiel is able to locate a memory of Michael getting stabbed in the arm with the spear of the Kaia Nieves from the Bad Place. Sam, Dean and Jody Mills track down Kaia who is being hunted by Michael's enhanced vampires. During a confrontation with Kaia, Dean remembers Michael attempting to make a deal with Kaia who refused and attacked him with the spear, which is capable of harming and possibly killing Michael. Following an attack by three of Michael's monsters, Kaia departs with the spear even though Michael will never stop hunting her as long as she has it. Dean tells Sam that possession by Michael was like drowning and he blames himself for Michael's rampage.

In "Nightmare Logic", the Winchesters and Bobby face a djinn whose powers have been enhanced by Michael. The djinn explains that Michael, while still in Dean's body, had ordered him to set himself up someplace quiet and act as a trap for hunters. Before Dean kills him. the djinn warns that Michael has dozens of similar traps all over for hunters.

In "Nihilism", Sam and Castiel trap Michael using a combination of a holy fire cocktail and angel cuffs. Michael summons monsters to rescue him. Trapped, Sam attempts to get help from the reaper Violet who refuses until the group is suddenly teleported to the Bunker. Michael is chained to a post but summons his army to rescue him and works to instill doubts in Jack and Castiel over Dean's relationship with them. Michael reveals that after learning about God from Dean's mind, he has come to believe that God considers both worlds "failed drafts" and has left to start again. Michael states that he intends to destroy all of the worlds he can until he finds God and kills him, too. In an attempt to stop Michael, Sam and Castiel use the British Men of Letters mind-link device to enter Dean's mind to try to get him to throw Michael out, locating Dean in a world that Michael has created for him where Dean is perfectly happy. After Dean is reminded of the truth, Michael appears in the bar and taunts Dean for seeing Sam and Castiel as burdens. However, they realize that Michael is stalling and is powerless. However, Michael retains his superior fighting skills and warns that Dean will be burnt out if he is kicked out of Dean's body. The three team up to trap Michael in the bar cooler, effectively trapping Michael in Dean's mind. Though Dean intends to be Michael's cage, he continues to work to break free while his army disbands. Billie later visits Dean and warns him that all versions of Dean's fate but one has Michael escaping and using Dean's body to destroy the world. Billie shows Dean the single fate where Michael loses, shocking him at what it reveals must be done. In "Damaged Goods", Dean reveals that he must lock himself in a magical box, a prison impenetrable even to an archangel, and imprison them both at the bottom of the ocean. However, Sam and Castiel talk him out of the plan in "Prophet and Loss".

In "Ouroboros", Dean is knocked unconscious by a Gorgon during a hunt, allowing Michael to escape from his prison. Rather than possess Dean again, Michael seeks revenge on him and his family. He leaves Dean's body and forces the witch Rowena MacLeod to say "yes" and slaughters several hunters. Michael gloats to the Winchesters and Castiel, whom he tortures, until Jack taps into the power of his soul to face off with Michael. Jack is able to exorcise Michael from Rowena and incinerates the swirling cloud of light that Michael had become, as he deems that he will not hurt anyone again. Jack absorbs Michael's grace. Jack announces to the others that Michael is dead, and his grace has fully restored Jack's powers. However, it is later revealed that killing Michael burned away Jack's soul, leaving him completely soulless.

In the Season 15 episode "Our Father, Who Aren't In Heaven", Castiel shows the Michael of the Winchesters' world some of his memories of this Michael amongst other things while trying to convince him of God's betrayal. Michael is completely disillusioned after this, particularly as he now knows that he is not the only Michael.

=== Naomi ===
Naomi, portrayed by Amanda Tapping, is a "cool", "mysterious", and "polished" villain who first appears at the end of the episode "A Little Slice of Kevin". She is affiliated with a previously unknown faction of angels, eventually revealed to be "Heaven's intelligence division", a group tasked with secretly brainwashing angels and altering their memories to keep them both in-line with Heaven's orders and oblivious to the truth of their actions and goals.

While casting Naomi, the character was compared to The Good Shepherd's antihero Edward Wilson, Sr. (Matt Damon), in that she is "willing to sacrifice everything for the greater good". In his 2014 revision of The Essential Supernatural: On the Road with Sam and Dean Winchester, Nicholas Knight described her as "a powerful angel...ruthless in her quest to prevent the angel tablet from falling into the wrong hands". Despite her role as an antagonist, Knight noted that Naomi "quickly became one of the most enigmatic and popular new characters of the (eighth) season".

In her debut she claims responsibility for Castiel's mysterious return from Purgatory though he cannot remember her and demonstrates her complete control over his actions. Although she tells him off-screen that she is the current ruler of Heaven, Metatron later claims that she is only one of many faction leaders at war with each other. In "Torn and Frayed", Naomi tasks Castiel with rescuing Samandriel after she gets his distress call while Crowley tortures him. Upon learning that Samandriel has revealed the existence of the angel Word of God tablet to Crowley, however, she forces Castiel to kill the other angel, which she justifies by emphasizing the tablet's importance, labeling Samandriel a traitor. Prior to his death, Samandriel had been trying to tell Castiel something about Naomi, triggering Castiel's memory in which Naomi was approaching his eye with a mysterious instrument resembling a drill while he was restrained and screaming. Noticing Castiel's strange actions and behavior, the Winchesters become suspicious that Castiel is being controlled. "Goodbye Stranger" opens with the revelation that Naomi has been working on fully subduing Castiel to her control and determines him to be "ready" once he kills thousands of copies of Dean. She then sends him to get the angel tablet before Crowley can. After he finds the tablet and she orders him to kill Dean, Castiel manages to fight her control and eventually breaks it by touching the tablet. He tells Dean about her before going into hiding to protect the tablet. In an encounter with Crowley, Naomi says that Castiel is doing what he is meant to do: protect the tablet, even if it means protecting it from her. She is later shown to be searching for Castiel to find the tablet.

In "Taxi Driver", Naomi meets with Dean to try to convince him that she is on his side, claiming that Castiel had misinformed him about her due to his mental instability, and that she wants to help Castiel; Dean does not believe her. Nonetheless, Naomi tips him off to the danger Sam is in and later saves Sam and Dean from Crowley, driving the demon off and helping the Winchesters complete the second trial to seal Hell by enabling a trapped Bobby's soul to ascend to Heaven. She reiterates that Dean can trust her and that they all share the goal of sealing Hell. Naomi and her angels eventually slaughter the patrons of a restaurant they know Castiel is passing through and leave one alive, traumatized in order to make him stop long enough for them to capture him; Naomi kills the survivor afterward, rejecting Castiel's angry reminder that they (angels) are supposed to guard humans. She interrogates Castiel about the tablet's location and reveals that she has been altering and erasing his memories for longer than known, complaining that he has never functioned as he was supposed to. She flees when Crowley attacks her men and fires at her with a gun loaded with melted-down angel blades. In the Season 8 finale, Naomi learns that Metatron is working with Castiel, prompting her to capture the rogue angel and use her drill-like instrument to access his thoughts and learn his plans; when she finds out what they are, she is horrified and immediately warns Dean and Castiel, revealing that Metatron is not trying to close the gates of Heaven, but rather trying to permanently expel all angels in revenge for himself having to flee to escape her and the archangels, who had ordered her to detain him and take the knowledge he had as the Scribe of God after God left Heaven. Naomi expresses remorse for her actions and that of the other angels, saying that angels are meant to protect humanity. To begin making amends, she warns Dean that if Sam completes the trials, he will die, and then offers to hear Castiel out if he truly wishes to return to Heaven. As they cannot confirm her claims, Castiel refuses to believe her, though Dean does and ultimately stops Sam from completing the trials. Naomi is later found collapsed on her desk in her "office" in Heaven. Metatron had gotten free and stabbed her in the head with her own drill off-screen. Metatron taunts Castiel that she had been telling the truth, and then completes his plan. Naomi is confirmed dead through dialogue in the episode "I'm No Angel" in Season 9.

In the Season 13 episode "Funeralia", Castiel returns to Heaven for the Angels' help on finding the still living Gabriel and fighting the invading Alternate Michael, only to find Naomi alive. Naomi explains that she survived Metatron's attack, but her injuries were such that she had the word spread that she was dead. Even after nearly five years to put her thoughts back together, Naomi is still only "mostly here". However, her presence is needed since less than a dozen angels are still alive, including Naomi and Castiel. Displaying a vastly different personality, Naomi explains to Castiel that the surviving angels will soon burn out and Heaven will crumble if something does not change. As a result, the angels cannot leave Heaven without risking this happening. The angels only chance is for Gabriel to return as his power can stabilize Heaven. If he cannot be found, when Heaven crumbles, all of the souls will be released upon Earth as ghosts. Now allies, Naomi accompanies Castiel to Earth and promises that the remaining angels will keep Heaven going for as long as they can if he cannot find Gabriel, but expresses a belief that maybe the situation cannot be fixed. As she returns to Heaven, Naomi seals the portal behind her until the situation is resolved.

During the Season 14 episode "Byzantium", she appears again where she meets Castiel and Dumah in Jack's Heaven after he dies and ascends. She explains to Castiel that Jack left and a threat is invading Heaven while defeating the angels. Naomi elaborates on it being The Shadow (the entity that rules The Empty) and reveals that she knows Castiel meeting it since he is the only angel to ever escape the realm. Naomi states The Shadow wants Jack because it believes he belongs in its domain. She had considered giving into its demands since Heaven would otherwise crumble. When Castiel refused, she tried to plead to her brother but The Shadow possessed her and she implored her siblings to run. Later on, Naomi meets Castiel again after he made a deal with The Shadow and left. She is seen unharmed from the attack and thanks him for his role even if he did not do it for Heaven. As a reward, she tells Castiel the location of Alternate Michael.

In "Absence", Castiel attempts to contact Naomi, but gets Dumah instead who claims that Naomi is unavailable. In "Jack in the Box", Castiel returns to Heaven where Dumah reveals that she overthrew Naomi following the Shadow's invasion of Heaven and has locked Naomi in a small cell. Dumah begins manipulating Jack to solidify her own power and establish a reign of terror but is killed by Castiel when she threatens the shared Heaven of John and Mary Winchester. Following Dumah's death and Jack becoming the God, it is unclear if Naomi was released from the dungeon.

=== Raphael ===
Raphael is the archangel assigned to protecting Chuck Shurley. Raphael appears to protect Chuck twice, in "The Monster at the End of the Book", when he is in the presence of Lilith, and in "Lucifer Rising", where he kills Castiel as he and Dean attempt to prevent Lucifer's rise. He is summoned and subsequently trapped by Dean and a resurrected Castiel in the Season 5 episode "Free to Be Me and You", but refuses to cooperate when they demand to know the location of God, only saying that he believes that God is dead. Dean and Castiel leave Raphael trapped despite his threat to hunt Castiel down when he escapes. In this episode, Raphael appears for the first time in a bodily vessel and is played by actor Demore Barnes, who reprises the role in "The Third Man" and "The Man Who Would Be King". Following the prevention of the Apocalypse, Raphael and his supporters are at war with Castiel and his followers over Castiel's opposition to Raphael's plan to free Lucifer and Michael to restart the Apocalypse. He makes his second on-screen appearance in the Season 6 episode "The Third Man", in which he and his soldiers are in close pursuit of Castiel. Raphael overpowers Castiel and is about to kill him when Balthazar intervenes and irrevocably destroys Raphael's vessel with one of Heaven's weapons, saving Castiel's life. Raphael is forced to search for a new vessel, eventually possessing a woman played by Lanette Ware. In "The French Mistake", he sends the angel hitman Virgil after Castiel's allies, including the Winchesters. Balthazar transports the brothers to an alternate universe with a key to where Heaven's weapons are stored and Virgil follows. This is revealed to have been a ploy by Balthazar and Castiel, allowing the latter time to retrieve the weapons. Now equipped with the weapons, Castiel forces Raphael to flee when the latter is poised to kill a returned Sam and Dean. Flashbacks in "The Man Who Would Be King" depicts the background to Raphael's war with Castiel; Raphael believed that the Apocalypse was destined to happen and informed Castiel of his intention to release Lucifer and Michael from the cage, giving Castiel the ultimatum to submit or die. Having forged a deal with the demon Crowley, Castiel attacked Raphael and declared war in Heaven. In the Season 6 finale, "The Man Who Knew Too Much", Castiel reneges on his deal with Crowley, who turns to Raphael. Crowley agrees to open Purgatory for Raphael in exchange for his safety. However, their ritual fails whilst Castiel opens Purgatory for himself. Castiel appears, now more powerful than ever, and obliterates Raphael with a snap of his fingers. In "We Happy Few", when discussing how they will defeat the Darkness, God tells the Winchesters that he cannot resurrect Raphael or Gabriel as they are beings of primordial creation and will take too long to bring back.

=== Tessa ===
Tessa is a reaper who guides the souls of the deceased to the afterlife (see also Psychopomp). She is portrayed by Lindsey McKeon. Following the car accident in the first-season finale, Dean is critically wounded, and his soul leaves his body. Dean attempts to save other souls and defends himself from a reaper. The reaper then returns in the form of Tessa, posing as a coma patient. She attempts to convince Dean to move on but, as he considers this, Azazel intervenes as part of his deal with John Winchester and possesses Tessa to restore Dean to life, although Dean remembers none of this. In the Season 4 episode "Death Takes a Holiday", she continues the work of a local reaper who has gone missing. After restoring Dean's memories of her with a kiss, she assists the brothers and agrees not to reap the souls for the duration. She is kidnapped by Alastair as part of a ritual to unlock a seal, but Dean and Sam rescue her. After getting Dean to help her have a young boy named Cole move on from being a ghost, she warns Dean that the angels are not looking for his best interest and to trust his own instincts. In "Appointment in Samarra", Dean summons Tessa during an out-of-body experience and asks her to call Death. Although she refuses, Death arrives on his own accord. Subsequently, Tessa guides Dean in his role as Death for 24 hours as part of a wager made with the Horseman in order to retrieve Sam's soul. Tessa returns in "Stairway to Heaven" where she is a part of Castiel's faction to retake Heaven. She has grown depressed over the fact that she can no longer ferry souls to Heaven due to it being closed and that she can hear their cries for help and is brainwashed by Metatron into acting as a suicide bomber for him, supposedly under Castiel's instruction in order to unite all the angels under his command. Tessa is found and captured by Dean before she can do this and her "bomb" is defused. Dean questions Tessa who, under her brainwashing, insists she is doing it for Castiel. When Dean pulls the First Blade on her, Tessa commits suicide by impaling herself on the Blade while Dean is holding it, thanking him at the same time. Her method of suicide makes it appear that Dean murdered her and helps turn Castiel's followers against him.

== Demons ==
Demons in the series are generally portrayed as cruel and sadistic, often taking pleasure in causing humans pain. They are also, as series creator Eric Kripke deemed them, "erudite and sophisticated". While the demon "tyrant" Azazel commands them in the first two seasons, demons were the sole antagonists of the third season. At times, their culture is compared to normal humans, with the third-season episode "Sin City" introducing their religious side. Many believe Lucifer was their own higher power. Though many demons came to lose faith, they followed the fallen angel upon his release from Hell in the fifth season.

Inspirations for these types of demons came from numerous sources, such as the devil-on-your-shoulder concept used in the episode "Sin City". The writers often tried to base the demons on actual aspects of history, as was done in "Malleus Maleficarum" by having the demon Tammi turn a group of women into witches. An encyclopedia on demons was used for research, with Binsfield's Classification of Demons inspiring "The Magnificent Seven's" storyline of seven demons being the physical embodiment of the Seven Deadly Sins.

The writers originally intended for demons to not rely on human hosts, but rather exist "halfway between spirits and corporeal creatures". However, the demon in "Phantom Traveler" demonstrates the ability to possess people. This quality and its other characteristics were chosen without foresight solely to fit with the episode's storyline, and the writers opted to maintain it as an element of all demons. Kripke felt it added an interesting aspect to the storylines, as the viewers "never quite know who the bad guy is". Another source of debate for the writers stemmed from the demons' eye color, which is based on a demon's place in the hierarchy. The writers preferred to limit unique colors to only the "big, big, bad guys". Writer Sera Gamble noted, "If every time we had a demon that was powerful we gave them a different eye color, pretty soon it'd be like, 'The Chartreuse-Eyed Demon is coming for us!'" During the production of the second season, Kripke viewed the horror film I Walked with a Zombie, and found one of the creatures having all-white eyes to be "really disturbing". The writers considered changing the eye color of regular demons to white, but eventually decided against it. However, Kripke later used the idea when Lilith and other high-level demons were introduced.

A demon in the first-season episode "Phantom Traveler". The appearance of demons has since evolved throughout the series.

The appearance of a demons' true form became more complex as the series progressed. Originally depicted as small, thin streams of black smoke, demons began to appear as large, thick smoke clouds. When in large groups, the clouds have electricity pulsing throughout them. The visual effects department based the demons' shape on that of a snake, giving it a "predatorial" and "intelligent" look. Visual effects supervisor Ivan Hayden found demon smoke to be one of the hardest visual effects in the series.

=== Abaddon ===
Primarily portrayed by actress Alaina Huffman, Abaddon is the last remaining Knight of Hell, a class of mighty demons who were among the first of their kind. Abaddon is too strong to be affected by exorcisms or killed by Ruby's knife. She is introduced in the eighth-season episode "As Time Goes By" in which she is sent to destroy the Men of Letters organization in 1958 and sets off in pursuit of Sam and Dean's grandfather, Henry Winchester, who escaped with the key to the Men of Letters' bunker. Wanting to break into the bunker to gain access to the powerful supernatural spells and artifacts inside, Abaddon follows Henry through time to the present and hunts him and his grandsons throughout the episode. As a result, she holds Sam hostage to force Dean to hand over Henry and the key, promising to let Sam and Dean go after the trade. Abaddon goes back on her agreement and ends up mortally wounding Henry, but not before he shoots her in the head with a bullet engraved with a devil's trap, binding her powers and her to her now-paralyzed host body. Sam and Dean then cut her up and bury her in cement to forever entomb her. In "Clip Show", Sam and Dean need a demon to cure for the third trial to close the gates of Hell, so they sew Abaddon back together to use her, without reattaching her hands or removing the bullet. Abaddon reveals that she had been sent to kill the priest who found a way to cure demons, and that while torturing him, she found out about the Men of Letters (including her host Josie Sands) from him. This ultimately resulted in her possessing Josie and attacking the Men of Letters. While Sam and Dean take a phone call from Crowley outside, Abaddon frees herself and escapes by controlling one of her severed hands and using it to remove the bullet from her skull. In the following episode, the season finale "Sacrifice", she arrives in response to Crowley's distress call but attacks him rather than help him. Abaddon declares her intention of taking over Hell, only to be driven away when Sam sets her ablaze in holy fire.

Abaddon returns in the ninth season, her objectives to kill Crowley, become the Queen of Hell, and "turn all of humankind into her demon army". With Crowley being largely absent from Hell and having been deeply affected by the incomplete demon cure forced on him by the Winchesters, the intimidating Abaddon ends up winning the nearly unanimous support of the other demons. In "First Born", Crowley and Dean go to her maker, teacher, and former lover, Cain, to get his Mark. The Mark of Cain makes it possible to wield the First Blade, the only weapon capable of killing Abaddon. Cain reveals that Abaddon, after failing to persuade him to rejoin her, had tricked him into murdering his beloved human wife Colette. He made a promise to Colette, making him unable to seek revenge directly, so he gives Dean the Mark so that Dean can kill Abaddon once Crowley finds the Blade.

The episode "Mother's Little Helper" reveals that Abaddon's history with the Men of Letters goes back further than previously thought. Abaddon had been confronted by Henry and Josie when stealing people's souls at a convent before her slaughter of the Men of Letters. She intended to possess Henry to spy on the Men of Letters before destroying them, but accepted Josie's offer and possessed her instead, all without Henry's knowledge.

In the present, Abaddon gives the order for her minions to begin stealing souls again to build an army of demons loyal to her. In an attempt to eliminate all threats posed to her and her rule, Abaddon concocts a plan to kill Crowley and the Winchesters and destroy the First Blade. She brings Crowley's human son Gavin forward in time and tortures him until Crowley agrees to help her set up a trap for Sam and Dean. In an attempt to destroy them all at once, Abaddon sends Crowley to the Winchesters to retrieve the First Blade and then lead them to her. Crowley manages to double-cross Abaddon and warn Dean of the trap, but he is unable to restrain her. Abaddon ends up shooting Crowley with a devil's trap bullet, preventing him from interfering in the upcoming fight. Before she can enact the rest of her plan and kill Crowley, Gavin, and the Winchesters, she is slain by Dean wielding the First Blade. Following Abaddon's death, most demons go back to following Crowley. Those that remained loyal to Abaddon tried to ambush Dean following their leader's death in "Black" only to be easily killed themselves.

Executive producer and series writer Adam Glass revealed on Twitter that Abaddon was inspired by Lauren Bacall, an actress whom he admires. Showrunner Jeremy Carver went into the character's motivation, explaining that Abaddon was "appalled" to find that Crowley ruled over Hell because she "loves Hell and what it represents." He believed that the contrasts in the two characters' views incited "a nice conflict to our demon world".

=== Abraxas ===
Abraxas, portrayed by Nelson Leis in season 14, is the powerful and sadistic black-eyed demon who murdered the family of Lucifer's future vessel Nick.

Abraxas is briefly mentioned, though not by name, in season 5's "Sympathy for the Devil" when Lucifer mentions the brutal murders of Nick's family to manipulate him into consenting to possession.

In season 14's "Gods and Monsters", Nick learns that his family's murders are still unsolved after nine years and seeks revenge, starting with Arty Nielson, his neighbor who witnessed a man running out of Nick's house on the night of the murders. In "Unhuman Nature", Nick tracks down Frank Kellogg, the police officer Abraxas possessed on the night of the murders. Frank tells Nick that Nick's wife, Sarah, had called the police to report a prowler, and when Frank investigated, he found Abraxas outside. After introducing himself, Abraxas possessed Frank and brutally beat Sarah and Nick's son, Teddy, to death with a hammer. Nick remembers that Lucifer knew the name Abraxas and realizes that a demon killed his family, but still murders Frank regardless.

In "Damaged Goods", Nick captures, tortures, and murders demons in search of Abraxas. Nick finally captures a demon who worked with Abraxas to kill almost an entire Girl Scout troop. The demon reveals that Abraxas was captured by Sam and Dean Winchester's mother, Mary Winchester. After receiving the information, Nick kills the demon and goes to find Mary. Nick kidnaps Mary and forces her to admit that when she couldn't defeat Abraxas, she trapped him in an Enochian puzzle box. Nick forces Mary to lead him to the storage unit where the puzzle box is located and kidnaps a security guard named Jeff to act as Abraxas' vessel. While possessing Jeff, Abraxas is trapped by a devil's trap. Abraxas offers to tell Nick what he wants to know if Nick murders Mary. The Winchesters and Sheriff Donna Hanscum interrupt, causing Nick to break the devil's trap and free Abraxas. Abraxas reveals to Nick that Lucifer ordered him to commit the murders and Abraxas had chosen him by throwing a dart at the phone book. Dean attempts an exorcism, but Abraxas stops him. While Abraxas is distracted, Nick approaches from behind and kills Abraxas with an angel blade.

=== Asmodeus ===
First mentioned in season 12's "Stuck in the Middle (With You)", Asmodeus is a demon and one of the four Princes of Hell alongside Azazel, Ramiel, and Dagon. Like Ramiel and Dagon, Asmodeus is stated to have left Hell a long time ago, having lost interest in Lucifer's plans in favor of his "hobbies". Both Lucifer and Gabriel describe him as the weakest of the Princes of Hell. Lucifer also implies that Asmodeus is the youngest of the Princes of Hell.

Asmodeus (portrayed primarily by Jeffrey Vincent Parise) first appears in season 13's "The Rising Son." Appearing in Crowley's former palace, Asmodeus announces himself as the new King of Hell to all of the gathered demons with a stated intention to rule until Lucifer or his Nephilim son Jack can be found to replace him. Displaying immense powers, Asmodeus quickly begins reshaping Hell to his standards, summarily executing several demons that fail to meet those standards. Asmodeus uses his shapeshifting abilities to get close to the Winchesters and Jack. Disguised as the Prophet Donatello Redfield, Asmodeus manipulates Jack into opening a portal to release the Shedim, creatures that even Lucifer fears. After Asmodeus is exposed, he is forced to retreat by an enraged Jack.

In "War of the Worlds", Asmodeus uses his powers to search for Jack while also interrogating those who have seen the Winchesters. Asmodeus senses Lucifer's return from the Apocalypse World and finds Lucifer and Castiel together in a bar. Recognizing his "father's" weakened state, Asmodeus announces an intention to keep power for himself in Hell and imprisons Lucifer and Castiel. He then hires Arthur Ketch, a former member of the British Men of Letters and a skilled assassin, to help him search for Jack. To keep the Winchesters from finding out that Castiel has been captured, Asmodeus impersonates Castiel on a phone call to trick them. Asmodeus contacts the Winchesters in this way for a few episodes to both keep them off of his trail and see if they have learned anything about Jack's location. Lucifer and Castiel later manage to escape in "Various & Sundry Villains" while Asmodeus is away.

In "The Scorpion and The Frog", Asmodeus learns of the Crossroads Demon Barthamus' plans to attack Luther Shrike's home and retrieve the trunk containing Barthamus' human bones. Wanting to get rid of the traitor, Asmodeus sends a demonic messenger to warn Luther and ask to tip him off if Barthamus arrives. Luther refuses to help Asmodeus and exorcises the messenger instead.

In "Devil's Bargain", Asmodeus attempts to have Arthur Ketch track down and kill the weakened Lucifer. At the same time, he interrogates the Prophet Donatello Redfield, learning of the Winchesters' plot to open the door to Apocalypse World. Asmodeus places Donatello under his control as an unwitting spy. After Arthur fails to kill Lucifer, Asmodeus unveils his newest acquisition: the Archangel Blade, the one weapon that can kill Lucifer. Arthur points out that only an archangel can wield it, causing Asmodeus to introduce the archangel Gabriel who has been believed dead for nearly eight years. Gabriel is shown to be Asmodeus' prisoner.

In "The Thing", Arthur discovers Asmodeus injecting himself with Gabriel's grace. Asmodeus dismisses Arthur until he is ready to see the man, and is less than pleased to learn that Arthur knew that Castiel was in Syria seeking out the Tree of Life. Enraged by Arthur's recent actions, Asmodeus beats the man brutally, claiming Arthur to be worse than any demon he knows and that he owns Arthur due to this nature, despite Arthur's desire for redemption. Asmodeus' beating causes Arthur to break Gabriel out and steal the Archangel Blade and Asmodeus' store of Gabriel's extracted grace, bringing all three to the Winchesters.

In "Bring 'em Back Alive", Gabriel tells Sam and Castiel that after faking his death, he was captured and sold to Asmodeus who tortured him for years and used his grace to gain powers. As Sam and Castiel try to treat the traumatized Gabriel, Asmodeus uses his powers to seek Gabriel out, eventually locating him in the Winchesters' bunker. Asmodeus calls Sam and threatens to destroy the bunker if Gabriel is not turned over to him in ten minutes. When Sam fails to comply, Asmodeus breaks through the wards and leads a demon incursion to kill Sam and Castiel and recapture Gabriel. Though the incursion is initially successful, when Asmodeus begins torturing Sam and Castiel, it causes Gabriel to snap out of his traumatized state and fight back. Asmodeus proves to be no match for the enraged archangel who incinerates Asmodeus in retaliation for all that the Prince of Hell did to him.

In "Unfinished Business", the Winchesters encounter Gabriel, who is seeking revenge against the Norse gods Loki, Fenrir, Sleipnir, and Narfi. Gabriel believes the gods betrayed him and sold him to Asmodeus to make a profit before Lucifer discovered he was still alive. Gabriel reveals that he was tortured by Asmodeus every day for years and remains weakened as Asmodeus drained much of his grace. Gabriel notes that his grace has not had a chance to recharge much after he used it to kill the Prince of Hell. Loki tells Dean later on that he sold Gabriel to Asmodeus because he blamed Gabriel for the death of his father Odin at Lucifer's hands.

=== Belphegor ===
Belphegor, portrayed by Alexander Calvert, is a demon who is released from Hell when God begins the Apocalypse and allies himself with the Winchesters. While he is a low-tier demon, his actual eye color is unknown as his host's eyes are burned out while Belphegor is possessing him. Belphegor only states that he is not a regular black-eyed grunt nor is he a Crossroads Demon. He is also known to have worked as a torturer in Hell.

In "Back and to the Future", possessing the corpse of Lucifer's Nephilim son Jack, Belphegor presents himself as an ally to the Winchesters. He explains that in Hell he tortures souls and loves his job and as such, he wants to restore Hell back to normal. While reluctant, the Winchesters and Castiel agree to ally with Belphegor who promises to leave Jack's body as soon as he finds a suitable new vessel. Belphegor helps the three escape the horde of zombies that has them trapped and offers a spell to contain the escaped souls to a one-mile radius around the cemetery where they were released. Working with Dean, Belphegor successfully casts the spell and contains the ghosts. However, he reveals to Dean that every door in Hell was opened which means two to three billion ghosts are now loose and in addition, Lucifer's Cage was opened, potentially releasing Michael to wreak havoc. In "Raising Hell", Belphegor continues to aid the Winchesters, Castiel and Rowena in their efforts to contain the escaped ghosts and the failing barrier. At the same time, Arthur Ketch reveals that he has been hired by the demon Ardat to assassinate Belphegor, whom she calls "a monstrous threat to humanity".

In "The Rupture", after the Book of the Damned fails to fix the barrier, Belphegor offers up a solution: Lilith's Crook, a horn created by Lilith to draw the demons and souls of Hell back to her in case they ever fell out of her control. While Belphegor and Castiel travel into Hell to get the crook, Sam and Rowena will perform a spell to seal the rupture. Though Belphegor claims he only needs Castiel as backup, Castiel remains suspicious of his motives, especially upon discovering that the crook is in a chest sealed in Enochian which only Castiel can read. The two are attacked by Ardat who reveals that Belphegor's true motive has always been to take power in Hell for himself and is using the Winchesters and Castiel for that purpose. Belphegor kills Ardat and confirms that she was telling the truth, intending to use the crook to draw all of the demons and souls inside of himself to gain unlimited power. As Belphegor uses the horn, he is beaten to the ground by Castiel and tries to pretend to be Jack to get Castiel to stop. Seeing through the deception, Castiel smites Belphegor without hesitation, killing the demon and destroying the crook but at the cost of burning Jack's body into a charred skeleton. After learning of Belphegor's demise, Dean is angry with Castiel as he feels that the demon was a threat they could have dealt with at a later time and Belphegor's demise before they could finish the plan resulted in Rowena having to sacrifice herself to send the remaining souls back to Hell. Castiel's actions with Belphegor as well as his hiding Jack's soulless state create a rift between the two for some time.

=== Cain ===
Cain, (portrayed by Timothy Omundson) was the First Son of Adam and Eve who killed his brother Abel. While everyone believed that Cain had killed Abel because he was talking to God, Cain actually killed him because he was talking to Lucifer. Loving his brother, Cain made a deal with Lucifer: Abel's soul in Heaven in exchange for Cain becoming the first Knight of Hell while wielding the Mark of Cain. However, as part of the deal, Cain had to kill Abel personally. Afterwards, feeling remorse for his actions, Cain took his own life, but the Mark resurrected him as a powerful demon. For thousands of years, Cain was the worst of the worst, gaining the title Father of Murder and training the rest of the Knights of Hell. Eventually, Cain fell in love with a human woman, Colette, and gave up his evil ways for her, suppressing the Mark's influence on him to slaughter people. In 1863, the other Knights kidnapped Colette to force Cain back to his old ways. Cain slaughtered all of the Knights, but when he got to Abaddon, she possessed Colette and tricked Cain into killing his wife. Due to Colette's dying request, Cain didn't go after Abaddon for revenge and threw the First Blade to the bottom of the Marianas Trench as it couldn't be destroyed, eventually settling in Missouri. In First Born, while looking for the First Blade to kill Abaddon, Dean and Crowley tracked down Cain and asked for the First Blade. Cain was uninterested in helping them, wanting to keep his promise to Colette, but watched as Dean fought and killed three demons single-handedly. Impressed, Cain told Dean and Crowley his story, but still refused to help at first. Eventually, after speaking to Colette's grave, Cain chose to help by giving Dean the Mark of Cain so that he could wield the First Blade himself and kill Abaddon. In return, he asked Dean to kill him afterwards before sending Dean and Crowley away and taking on Abaddon's army single-handedly. In The Executioner's Song, it is revealed that killing Abaddon's demons caused Cain to fall back under the influence of the Mark of Cain. Giving into its rage, Cain decided that as so many of his descendants were killers and other sorts of criminals, he'd wipe out his bloodline, despite it being "legion". Cain killed many people, eventually being discovered by Sam and Dean when he kidnapped serial killer Tommy Tolliver. Cain confronted Castiel at the site of his victims' graves, but let him go so that Castiel would tell Dean who would bring the First Blade to kill him. Going after Tommy's son, Austin, Cain was lured into a devil's trap by Dean, Sam, Castiel and Crowley, after which Dean confronted him alone. Cain claimed to Dean that there was no cure for the Mark of Cain and it was better to give into its rage. Dean and Cain fought, but Cain proved more powerful and easily beat Dean, eventually getting the First Blade for himself. Before he could kill Dean, Dean managed to get Cain's knife and cut off his hand. Cain refused to give up killing, forcing Dean to kill him. While Dean retained his humanity, Cain's descent into madness left both him and Sam deeply worried.

=== The Crossroads Demon ===
A specific crossroads demon recurred throughout the second and third seasons of the series, possessing only young, beautiful women as her host. Actresses Christie Laing and Jeannette Sousa first portray her in "Crossroad Blues". Laing plays the demon in flashbacks depicting musician Robert Johnson selling his soul to learn to play the guitar, while Sousa portrays the demon in the present. The latter is summoned by Dean in an attempt to rescue a man from a demonic pact previously made. She rejects Dean's plea, instead taunting him about his father's suffering in Hell. Dean tricks her into walking into a Devil's Trap, and frees her in exchange for releasing the man from his contract. The demon returns again in the second-season finale "All Hell Breaks Loose", now in possession of a woman portrayed by Ona Grauer. She resurrects Sam in exchange for collecting Dean's soul in one year.

She makes her final appearance in "Bedtime Stories", now portrayed by Sandra McCoy. At the end of the episode, Sam summons her and demands she break her deal with Dean in exchange for her life. She claims to not hold the contract, being just an employee with a boss to answer to. A frustrated Sam kills the demon with the mystical Colt gun. McCoy was dating lead actor Jared Padalecki at that time after having worked with him on the 2005 film Cry Wolf. She previously auditioned for several love interests of the brothers, but believed that production had waited until the "perfect role" arrived before casting her due to their relationship.

=== Crowley ===
Crowley
- Supernatural character
- First appearance: "Abandon All Hope..." (2009)
- Last appearance: "All Along the Watchtower" (2017)
- Created by: Eric Kripke
- Based on: Aleister Crowley
- Portrayed by: Mark Sheppard

In-universe information
- Species: Red-eyed Demon; Human (formerly)
- Gender: Male
- Occupation: King of Hell
- Family: Rowena MacLeod (mother); Gavin MacLeod (son)
- Abilities: Demonic pacts Demonic possession Invulnerability; Occult knowledge Superhuman strength Pyrokinesis; Telekinesis; Teleportation

Crowley, originally Fergus MacLeod, is a fictional character on the American paranormal drama television series Supernatural, portrayed by actor Mark Sheppard. He is a demon known as the King of the Crossroads, and the King of Hell in Lucifer's absence. Introduced in the fifth season, Sheppard appeared in a recurring role in the next few seasons, and was eventually promoted to series regular in the tenth season. His final appearance was at the end of the twelfth season. His portrayal of Crowley has been met with positive reception from both critics and fans of the series. His name is inspired by Aleister Crowley.

==== Plot ====
===== Season 5 =====
Crowley is introduced mid-way through Season 5 in the episode "Abandon All Hope...", having first been mentioned near the end of the previous episode, "The Real Ghostbusters", when the series' protagonists Sam and Dean Winchester learn that Crowley—not Lilith, as was previously believed—had been the one who took The Colt from Bela Talbot in the Season 3. In the following episode, they track down and confront him. Crowley is introduced as the leader of all crossroads demons, and thus in charge of the deals by which Hell collects human souls. Although his guards capture the brothers, Crowley uses The Colt to kill his own men before explaining that he shares the Winchesters' goal of them killing Lucifer, as he suspects that Lucifer would kill all demons once he has killed all humans. Crowley gives The Colt to the brothers to use to kill Lucifer and then informs them of Lucifer's location so that they can find him. When The Colt fails to kill Lucifer, Crowley is forced to go on the run to evade retribution from Hell's forces for his betrayal. Learning of the Winchesters' new plan to stop Lucifer by trapping him in his cage in Hell once again using the Horsemen's rings, Crowley again aids the brothers in "The Devil You Know" to help them find Pestilence and retrieve his ring by orchestrating the capture of a high-ranking demonic minion of Pestilence's and ultimately manipulating the demon into revealing Pestilence's location. He then manipulates the Winchesters' long-time ally Bobby Singer to "lend" Crowley his soul in order for them to find Death, with Crowley assuring Bobby that he will rescind his claim on Bobby's soul once Lucifer is imprisoned. It is soon revealed that he wants Bobby's soul to prevent the brothers from killing him after they stop Lucifer. Despite ever-increasing animosity between himself and the rest of the group, Crowley helps Dean recover the final ring from Death.

===== Season 6 =====
The Season 6 episode "Weekend at Bobby's" reveals that Crowley went back on his promise to Bobby and plans to keep Bobby's soul, telling him that he will give him the ten years left of life customary for Faustian deals before he has him killed and brought to Hell. Eventually, however, Crowley is forced to return Bobby's soul to save his own life. The same episode establishes Crowley's backstory: he had been a 17th-century Scotsman named Fergus Roderick MacLeod whose own son, Gavin, hated him as much as he himself hated Gavin. Gavin provides the location of Crowley's grave, and the Winchesters dig up his remains and threaten to burn them, which would end his existence, if he does not return Bobby's soul. It is also revealed that Crowley has become the King of Hell since Lucifer's imprisonment in the Season 5 finale. He claims to be the one who pulled Sam out of Lucifer's cage, but it is eventually revealed that Castiel was responsible for this. Several episodes later, Crowley reveals himself to be manipulating hunters into working for him by capturing monsters. He explains that he wants to interrogate the monsters on how to reach Purgatory—the afterlife of monsters—to be able to harvest the souls there and build his own power. He then coerces Sam and Dean into working for him too, by claiming that he can restore Sam's missing soul; however, once he is forced to admit that he had lied in saying that he could, the angel Castiel seemingly kills him. It is eventually revealed that Crowley is, in fact, still alive and still trying to find Purgatory in secret; furthermore, he and Castiel have been working together all along to find Purgatory. They learn how to access Purgatory in the season finale, but Castiel reveals that he has no intentions of letting Crowley have any of the Purgatory souls, thus Crowley forms an alliance with Castiel's enemy Raphael. Castiel sabotages their spell to open Purgatory before taking all of the souls therein for himself, and Crowley makes his escape, leaving Raphael to be killed by Castiel.

===== Season 7 =====
Though reluctant to risk crossing the new god-like Castiel, Crowley once again secretly aids the Winchesters in Season 7 premiere "Meet the New Boss", this time in trying to defeat Castiel. When the Leviathans are released into the world from Castiel's body, Crowley attempts to strike an alliance with their leader, Dick Roman, but Dick scoffs at the idea of an alliance between their kind, instead insulting and threatening Crowley. In response, Crowley orders his demons to refrain from attacking Sam and Dean, to allow the Winchesters to wipe out the Leviathans. When it turns out that Crowley's blood is needed to construct a weapon to kill the Leviathans, he agrees on the condition that they retrieve the other components of the weapon first. Later, Crowley encounters Dick, who makes a deal with Crowley for the demon to give the Winchesters the wrong blood and thus sabotage the weapon. Despite the deal, Crowley gives Sam and Dean his real blood, resulting in Dick's death and the Leviathans' plan unraveling.

===== Season 8 =====
In Season 8, Crowley breaks off his alliance with the Winchesters and acts as an antagonist towards them, as they seek to seal all demons in Hell forever by completing three trials described in a Word of God tablet about demons. Crowley himself wants to use the tablet to unleash all demons onto Earth, and so hunts the tablet and the only one who can read it—the prophet Kevin Tran—relentlessly, but can only secure one broken-off half of the tablet. He later becomes interested in a tablet on angels as well. In "Taxi Driver", he attempts to sabotage the second trial Sam and Dean are trying to finish, by dragging the deceased Bobby's soul back to Hell where he had it trapped earlier through use of a reaper working for him. He flees when the angel Naomi is about to attack him, and the trial is ultimately completed. However, the episode ends with Crowley successfully capturing Kevin once again, trying to kill him after Kevin proves that he cannot be tricked or threatened into translating the half of the demon tablet. Crowley is thwarted by the intervention of the angel Metatron. Although Kevin takes Crowley's half of the demon tablet with him when he is rescued by Metatron, Crowley now has the angel tablet, having earlier found and taken it in a confrontation between Castiel and Naomi. In the next episode, he begins killing people whom Sam and Dean have saved, threatening to kill them all and undo the Winchesters' life work unless Sam and Dean surrender the whole demon tablet and give up the trials. Crowley is lured into a trap by Sam and Dean in the season finale, at which point they take him prisoner and make him the subject of the final trial: restoring a demon's humanity by injecting him with purified human blood. Although Crowley manages to make a distress call to other demons, the only one who shows up is Abaddon, who attacks Crowley, planning to take over Hell after killing him. Sam saves him from Abaddon and Crowley soon starts showing human emotion from the effects of Sam's blood, but the process is stopped before it is fully completed, as Sam and Dean learn that completing the last trial would require Sam's death.

===== Season 9 =====
Crowley remains the Winchesters' prisoner in the first half of the ninth season, with them using him for information. He is set free in the episode "Road Trip" when Dean lets him go to help him in saving Sam, and immediately starts trying to defeat Abaddon for rulership of Hell. He stages an elaborate set-up in "First Born" for the purpose of manipulating Dean into taking on the Mark of Cain, which enables Dean to wield the First Blade, the only weapon that can kill Abaddon. Crowley then sets out to find the lost First Blade for Dean to use on Abaddon. At the same time, Crowley is haunted by the memory of almost being cured and eventually turns to injecting himself with human blood to re-experience his lost humanity, later developing an addiction to it. The Winchesters are forced to help him at his most human in his addiction, but while the three of them manage to retrieve the First Blade by working together, Crowley bitterly concedes that Sam and Dean will try to kill him now that he has gotten them the Blade, and takes off with it to prevent that, planning to give it to Dean only once they have found Abaddon. Ultimately, though Crowley and his time-displaced son Gavin fall into Abaddon's clutches in "King of the Damned", he is able to aid Dean in killing her by giving him the location of the First Blade and discreetly tipping him off to her trap for him and Sam. Crowley's increased humanity prompts him to keep Gavin alive in the present to spare him the death he had experienced in his own time, and to reconcile much of their mutually hateful relationship. In the season finale "Do You Believe in Miracles?", Crowley reveals that he has stopped drinking human blood. At the end of the episode, he oversees Dean's transformation into a demon from the Mark and invites the newborn demon to join him.

===== Season 10 =====
In "Black" and "Reichenbach", Crowley and Dean are living it up away from everything. However, Crowley gets impatient with Dean's refusal to give up his new life and come to Hell with him to rule at his side. To feed the Mark, Crowley sends Abaddon supporters to Dean to kill and has him fulfill a crossroads deal for him by killing a man's wife and is annoyed when Dean kills the man instead. As Dean starts to get too out of his control, Crowley turns on him, calling Sam and letting him know where Dean is in exchange for the First Blade. In "Soul Survivor", Crowley returns to rule of Hell, executing Abaddon supporters, but finds his time with Dean to be causing him problems. To solve this, Crowley saves Castiel and Hannah from the rogue angel Adina and gives Castiel her grace so he can stop Dean by whatever means necessary, whether they be helping cure him or kill him. In "Girls, Girls, Girls", Crowley learns of the demonic brothel run by two of his demons and while disgusted as he finds it "tacky" rather than evil, orders one to track down the witch who destroyed the brothel. Crowley's demons capture the witch despite the Winchesters interference and Crowley is shocked to learn that the witch is his mother, Rowena. In "The Things We Left Behind", Crowley rebuffs Rowena's efforts to bond with him until she reveals that his demon minion Gerald has been trafficking demons to Earth. Crowley kills Gerald to save her, not knowing that Rowena was lying and lets her out of her cell. More of Crowley's backstory is revealed: Crowley's mother conceived him at an orgy and thus he grew up with no father. Rowena was a terrible mother who ended up abandoning him at age eight and never returning despite promising to, something Crowley holds a great deal of resentment towards her for. In "The Hunter Games", Crowley continues to let Rowena roam free, but mistrusts her. Rowena plots against Crowley, making him have nightmares of being attacked by his demons and spying on a meeting with the Winchesters where they ask him for the First Blade back to help get rid of the Mark of Cain. Crowley reluctantly goes to retrieve the Blade from where he stashed it in a crypt in Guam with his bones, but discovers it missing. Returning to Hell, he finds that Rowena has killed his loyal demon Guthrie who stole the Blade for her. Crowley believes Rowena's lies about Guthrie and informs the Winchesters he will keep the Blade until they are ready to use it to remove the Mark. In Season 10 Episode 17, inside man, Crowley kicks Rowena out because he learns that she has been plotting against him and has been lying to him.

===== Season 11 =====
After Sam's attempts to cure Dean of the Mark of Cain, Crowley turns back to his old villainy. He attempts to 'raise' Amara- a soul-draining young woman who was 'born' when the Mark was removed from Dean- for his own ends, but she soon proves too powerful to control. Lost for better solutions to the threat of Amara, Crowley provides Dean and Sam with a way to communicate with Lucifer in the Cage, but Lucifer subsequently escaped when Castiel, out of desperation against the threat posed by Amara, agrees to act as Lucifer's new vessel himself. Having retaken control of Hell, Lucifer has Crowley act as his 'servant', such as forcing him to clean a floor with a toothbrush, until one of Crowley's remaining followers helps him escape. Attempts to battle Lucifer and the Darkness eventually fail, but they are able to stop the threat by convincing Amara to reconcile with God, her 'brother'.

===== Season 12 =====
Despite Lucifer being freed from Castiel, he resorts to a random assault on the world, lacking any real plan beyond anger against the world that has 'mistreated' him. Working with Castiel and Rowena, Crowley is able to force Lucifer to keep 'jumping' between vessels, eventually exorcising him from the body of the President of the United States and trapping him back in Nick. He is also forced to send his son Gavin back in time to meet his original death in order to prevent the ghost of Gavin's fiancé Fiona killing more people in the present. Crowley initially plans to use Lucifer as his 'attack dog', having warded Lucifer's body so that he is trapped by his very vessel, but Lucifer feigns compliance so that he can win support from other demons to break the warding and free himself. Lucifer eventually escapes and apparently kills Crowley, something the Winchesters learn about from the British Men of Letters.

In "All Along the Watchtower", Crowley is revealed to have survived by possessing a rat before Lucifer "killed" him. Returning to his usual vessel, Crowley offers his help to defeat Lucifer at which point he promises to personally seal the Gates of Hell, tired of his job as the King of Hell and all of the backstabbing that comes with it. After discovering that the Nephilim's power has opened a rift to an alternate reality where the world has ended, Crowley works with the Winchesters to trap Lucifer in the alternate reality. As the spell requires the sacrifice of a life, Crowley says his goodbyes to the Winchesters before killing himself with an angel blade. Crowley's death completes the spell, but Lucifer is able to kill Castiel before he is trapped in the alternate reality with Mary Winchester.

==== Characterization ====
Originally, Crowley is described as "Lilith's right-hand man and King of the Crossroads", with the latter title referencing his role as the leader and "the most powerful" of the crossroad demons, a special subgroup of demons in Supernatural who fulfill the traditional concept of a "deal with the Devil" for one's soul. By the sixth season, Crowley has usurped leadership of Hell, becoming "the undisputed King of Hell". However, executive producer and current series showrunner, Jeremy Carver, explained that Crowley "actually doesn't care for [Hell] much", in contrast to Abaddon, his challenger for the crown in Season 9. Nicholas Knight, an author of various Supernatural supplementary materials, summarized Crowley as "nasty, cocky, brutally honest, and wickedly funny", and wrote that, "If [Crowley] weren't such a bad guy, he'd make one amazing hero—although technically he is a hero to the forces of evil."

Starting in the eighth season finale "Sacrifice", Crowley began exposing a "new emotional vulnerability" due to an unfinished demon-curing ritual performed on him in the episode and a resulting addiction to human blood in Season 9. On this topic, executive producer Robert Singer said that Crowley's secret enjoyment of his temporary sense of humanity influenced the character throughout the ninth season. However, Carver's statement raised the possibility that Crowley might not retain this humanity in Season 10.

Season 12 revealed he occupied his throne as "King Of Hell" because the prince of hell next in line for the throne, Ramiel, has no interest in the title. He gives Crowley the throne under one condition: that he be left alone, forever. Ramiel lived a solitary life fishing until one day, the Winchesters and Castiel go kicking up that nest. As Cass was dying from being impaled with the Lance of Michael, Sam Winchester defeated Ramiel with the Lance of Michael. Crowley saved Castiel by breaking the Lance, therefore breaking the spell the Lance of Michael carried.

==== Development ====
Maureen Ryan of the Chicago Tribune disclosed in her October 9, 2009 review of fifth season episode "Fallen Idols" that "the ubiquitous and talented Mark Sheppard" had been cast as the "pivotal" demon character Crowley in the upcoming episode "Abandon All Hope...". Sheppard had previously worked with Supernatural producer and director Kim Manners on The X-Files. Sheppard revealed in an interview with Variety on November 11, 2014, that he and Manners had discussed the possibility of Sheppard appearing on Supernatural, but that Manners had died before Sheppard ultimately landed his role as Crowley. In the same interview, Sheppard also revealed that when reading the script for "Abandon All Hope", he "got the giggles" and took the part partially to honor Manners and partially out of appreciation for the work of writer Ben Edlund, as Edlund had written for Firefly, another show on which Sheppard appeared.

In an exclusive interview with Michael Ausiello on July 15, 2010, series creator Eric Kripke confirmed that Crowley would return in the show's sixth season.

Knight felt that "Crowley's journey on the show has been a bold and ambitious one". On the Season 9 subplot of Crowley's human blood addiction, he wrote that it was "one of the most interesting and unexpected subplots of [the] season...and it left a lasting (and often amusing) impression on viewers." Carver, too, enjoys the character, stating, "He's pure evil, but, in an odd sort of way, we find him likable. He's so much fun to write."

When discussing plots that had been either set up or not resolved by the end of Season 9, Knight cited the developments in Crowley's story, questioning what the character plans to do with the demonic version of Dean he beckoned to in the closing moments of "Do You Believe in Miracles?" He also questioned Crowley's plans for demons at large under his control and how Hell may or may not change.

==== Reception ====
Critical response to Sheppard's characterization of Crowley has been largely positive. In a review of the episode "Blade Runners" New York's Vulture website, Price Peterson wrote, "This whole enemy-of-my-enemy relationship between the Winchesters and Crowley is one of the most compelling dynamics this series has seen, and as long as Supernatural keeps Crowley constantly on the verge of redemption, I see no end to its emotional rewards." Of the same episode, The A.V. Club member Phil Dyess-Nugent wrote, "Just how terrific is Mark A. Sheppard? There was a time, not so very long ago, when I would have tagged this as a trick question, but Sheppard has been playing Crowley long enough to have gotten comfortable in the part and grateful for the chance to do new things with it, and he carries 'Blade Runners' in the palm of his hand." On io9, Charlie Jane Anders praised Sheppard's "impeccable comic timing, and his ability to sell an entire scene with afew [sic] well-chosen facial expressions."

Fan reaction to Crowley has been described as being positive as well. The character was described as a "fan-favorite" and "one of the most iconic and popular characters on the show" since his first appearance. "He's a villain fans love to hate," Knight wrote, "and no matter how difficult he makes Dean and Sam's lives, viewers are always thrilled by Crowley's devilish ways", adding to Carver's warning that Crowley had not become truly human over the course of his Season 9 story arc, that, "A truly human Crowley is something fans would never really want anyway; it's much more fun rooting for a truly bad guy, especially when he's so darn entertaining."

=== Dagon ===
Dagon (portrayed by Ali Ahn) is one of the four Princes of Hell and one of the oldest and most powerful demons in existence. Despite being female (or in a female host), Dagon is still referred to as a Prince of Hell rather than a Princess. Like her brothers Ramiel and Asmodeus, Dagon long ago lost interest in Lucifer's plans and left Hell for a life on Earth. She is implied to have failed Lucifer in some way at some point.

She is first mentioned in a flashback in "Stuck in the Middle (With You)", when Ramiel tells Crowley that Dagon has her "toys" and is uninterested in ruling Hell. Later, Ramiel tells the Winchesters that Dagon has taken an interest in Lucifer's unborn Nephilim child, though Ramiel himself couldn't care less.

Dagon is first introduced in person in "Family Feud", when she kills two angels to save the life of Kelly Kline, the mother of Lucifer's unborn child. In "Somewhere Between Heaven and Hell", Castiel learns of Dagon's involvement and warns the Winchesters about her, stating that all he knows of Dagon is rumors of her psychotic savagery.

Dagon continues her role as protector of Lucifer's child in "The British Invasion". She is revealed to secretly be working for Lucifer who has promised Dagon a place at his side if she succeeds and is often in telepathic communication with the Fallen archangel. To cover her tracks, Dagon has another demon murder everyone who meets Dagon and Kelly, including a doctor who did a fetal examination on Kelly's insistence. Dagon's activities are discovered by hunter Eileen Leahy, who helps lure Kelly out. Dagon shows up at the meeting and resists all attempts to kill her, including with the Colt. Dagon disappears with Kelly and reveals to the woman that the pregnancy will ultimately be fatal to her.

In "The Future", Dagon finds Kelly following her suicide and resurrection by Lucifer's child. While Kelly now believes the child to be good, Dagon believes that the child simply acted out of self-preservation. Dagon is later attacked by a team of angels led by Castiel who attempt to kill her with the Colt. Castiel escapes with Kelly, but Dagon kills one of the angels and tortures the other for information before killing him too. Dagon then intercepts Castiel at Heaven's portal, killing the angel Joshua and engaging Castiel in battle. Dagon proves to be stronger than the angel, easily beating him to a pulp. The intervention of the Winchesters leads only to Dagon breaking Dean's arm and effectively destroying the Colt. As Dagon goes to kill Castiel, Lucifer's child empowers the angel from the womb, enabling him to stop Dagon and render her powerless to Dagon's shock. With the help of Lucifer's child, Castiel incinerates Dagon, killing her as predicted in a premonition the child shared with Kelly. The child's aid against Dagon convinces Castiel of his goodness.

In the season 13 episode "Lost & Found", the newborn Jack, Lucifer's son, experiences a flashback to Dagon's death when asked what he remembers. Jack states that he remembers "when the bad woman burned".

=== Ramiel ===
Ramiel (portrayed by Jerry Trimble) is one of the four Princes of Hell in Supernatural alongside Azazel, Dagon and Asmodeus. As a Prince of Hell, Ramiel is one of the oldest and most powerful demons to ever live and a retired demonic general. Unlike Azazel, Ramiel has long-since lost interest in Lucifer's plans and separated himself from Hell, joined by Dagon and Asmodeus. During his time on Earth, Ramiel becomes a collector of rare supernatural artifacts and weapons.

In a flashback in "Stuck in the Middle (With You)", the demon Crowley meets with Ramiel in 2010 following the defeat of Lucifer and the end of the Apocalypse. With Lucifer locked up again and Lilith and Azazel dead, Ramiel is next in line to be the King of Hell. However, Ramiel is uninterested, continuing to have no interest in the affairs of Hell and calling Azazel a "fanatic". Instead, Ramiel suggests that Crowley take power, but warns that if anyone disturbs him, there will be severe consequences. Crowley accepts Ramiel's terms and presents him with two gifts: the Lance of Michael, a weapon designed by the archangel Michael to kill Lucifer slowly and the Colt, the legendary gun that had once been used to kill Ramiel's brother Azazel.

In the present day of the episode, hunter Mary Winchester is sent by the British Men of Letters to steal the Colt from Ramiel. The organization fails to inform Mary that Ramiel is a Prince of Hell, leaving the group of hunters she assembles woefully unprepared to fight the demon. Mary claims that Ramiel is simply a demon she is trying to eliminate that is doing evil actions while hiding her true purpose from the group. After a failed intervention by Crowley's demons, Mary succeeds in stealing the Colt before Ramiel returns from night fishing. Due to his sheer power as a Prince of Hell, Ramiel shrugs off all attempts to kill him and mortally wounds the angel Castiel with the Lance of Michael. Enraged by the theft of the Colt, Ramiel tracks the hunters to a barn and attacks Crowley when he attempts to intercede on the Winchesters' behalf. The Winchesters briefly trap Ramiel in Holy Fire and he demands the return of the Colt. When they fail to turn it over, Ramiel breaks free of the Holy Fire and attacks the hunters, once more shrugging off their attacks. After Ramiel nearly kills Dean, Sam steals the Lance of Michael from him with the help of a distraction by Mary and impales the Prince with the weapon. Designed to kill Lucifer, the Lance turns Ramiel to dust and is shortly thereafter destroyed by Crowley to save Castiel's life.

=== Samhain ===
Samhain is a powerful whitish-eyed demon and the Origin of Halloween in season 4. Before he was imprisoned in Hell centuries ago, he reigned over Earth on Halloween night. People kept their children inside, they left treats to appease him and they left carved pumpkins on their doorsteps to worship him. His power seems to be intermediate between that of black-eyed demons and white-eyed demons. He maintains all traits and powers of a normal black-eyed demon, and he also proved capable of emanating a demonic energy blast similar to Lilith's.

Wanting to summon Samhain, two witches named Tracy Davis and Don Harding start performing the sacrifices needed to summon Samhain. This draws the attention of the Winchesters and the angels as the raising of Samhain is one of the 66 Seals. Sam and Dean kill Don, but Tracy reveals herself and successfully summons Samhain, breaking the seal. Samhain possesses Don's body and recognizes Tracy before killing her. Samhain is unable to tell that Sam and Dean are alive due to a "mask" of blood they smeared on their faces so he leaves them alone.

Samhain travels to a mausoleum where a bunch of high school students are having a party, locks them in and summons zombies and at least one ghost that attack. Sam and Dean rescue most of the kids and Dean deals with the monsters while Sam faces Samhain. Sam proves immune to Samhain's power so they fight hand to hand, but even with the demon-killing knife, Sam is no match for the demon. Finally, in the end, Sam manages to exorcise Samhain with his powers and sends him back to Hell.

A drawing of Samhain can be seen in Anna Milton's journal. The description says "Samhain. The next seal is broken." In Anna's drawing, Samhain's eyes are completely whitish, showing that Samhain is classified as a whitish eyed demon.

== Hunters ==
Hunters are men and women who spend their lives hunting supernatural creatures and attempting to save those affected by these creatures. Most appear to have had some kind of negative encounter with the supernatural, which prompts them to become hunters. While hunters, by their nature, operate 'off-the-grid, there are, nevertheless, hunter communities that meet and interact with each other to exchange information and stories; the Harvelle Roadhouse was one such location until it was burnt down. Typically, hunters find cases by consulting newspapers to track down information about suspicious deaths in certain areas. Some cases come about thanks to contact with people they knew before becoming hunters or contact with people they helped during previous hunts who turn to them for their expertise. Some hunters are shown to have particular targets, such as Sam and Dean's initial hunts in the show's first two seasons focusing on tracking the Yellow Eyed Demon who killed Dean and Sam's parents, or Gordon Walker 'specializing' in hunting vampires.

=== Asa Fox ===
Asa Fox, portrayed by Shaine Jones as an adult and Jack Moore as a child is a legendary Canadian hunter appearing in Supernatural.

As shown in flashbacks in season 12's "Celebrating the Life of Asa Fox", in 1980, a twelve-year old Asa was attacked by a werewolf, an attack that left a lasting scar upon his face. Asa was saved by hunter Mary Winchester who had come out of retirement briefly to tie up some loose ends, including killing the werewolf and stopping its killing spree. Asa became interested in what Mary was doing, especially when she told him that she intended to return to retirement. Inspired by the encounter, Asa went on to become a hunter himself despite his mother's objections and became legendary in the hunting community. Asa wrote postcards throughout his life to Mary detailing his discoveries and hunts, but never sent them as he never learned her whereabouts. During his hunting trips, Asa had many trysts with local women, one of which, with witch Tasha Banes, resulted in two children, Max and Alicia. In 2016, Asa met Sheriff Jody Mills while on a ghoul hunt and, unaware that the sheriff was also a hunter, claimed that he was FBI agent Fox Mulder while investigating the case. Jody saw through his obvious disguise, helped him complete the hunt, and began a casual relationship with Asa whenever he was around. While Asa was not aware of it, Jody held him in high regard and harbored hopes that their relationship could become more serious.

In 1997, Asa came up against the sadistic Crossroads Demon Jael. Asa managed to exorcise the demon, but not before the demon brutally murdered the young girl he was possessing. After escaping from Hell again, Jael began a personal vendetta against Asa, murdering a woman that Asa was seeing as well as other people he cared about and leaving their bodies in the forest for him to find. In 2016, Asa hunted Jael through a forest with his best friend Bucky Sims despite Asa not being armed with his angel blade, leading to an argument between the two men. During the argument, Bucky shoved Asa who fell and hit his head on a rock and died. Bucky then framed Asa's death as his having been murdered by Jael.

While on a visit to Jody, Mary's children Sam and Dean learned of Asa's death and decided to accompany Jody to his funeral. While never meeting personally, Sam and Dean recalled hearing stories about him in Ellen's roadhouse, and Asa's peer hunters were quick to share stories of him killing five wendigos in one night. Dean expressed skepticism initially (due to hearing the story in the midst of a drinking game inspired by the exploit) but he later confided to Sam that he believed Asa to be a 'legit' hunter, evidenced by his armory, complete with an angel blade. During the funeral, they encountered their mother Mary who had recently been resurrected following her death in 1983. Mary had received word of Asa's death and was distressed to learn that he had become a hunter. Jael took advantage of the funeral to target the other hunters one by one, finally possessing Jody. In Jody's body, Jael confessed to feeling cheated out of Asa's murder and forced Bucky to admit that he had killed Asa. Before carrying out a brutal revenge against the hunters, Sam, Dean, Max, Alicia and Mary, exorcised Jael from Jody in a sequential attack, with each subsequent hunter picking up the Latin incantation where the previous one left off. As a result of Jael's efforts, Bucky was disgraced for killing his best friend. Rather than exacting revenge upon Bucky themselves, the hunters chose to spread the true story of what happened. The next morning, Asa was given a Hunter's Funeral alongside the two hunters murdered by Jael at his wake.

=== Charlie Bradbury ===
Charlie Bradbury (born Celeste Middleton) (played by Felicia Day) first crosses paths with Sam and Dean when working as an I.T. expert at Richard Roman Enterprises. She is initially reluctant to get involved in the supernatural world by helping the Winchesters, but becomes a more reliable ally in her second episode and decides to become a hunter herself by her fourth episode. She quickly becomes a friend and even a surrogate little sister to the Winchesters. By the end of "The Girl with the Dungeons and Dragons Tattoo", it is revealed that her real name is not Charlie Bradbury but merely one of her aliases, and that she has had to go into hiding before. "Pac-Man Fever" delves into her past and it is indicated that "Charlie's" true surname is Middleton. "There's No Place Like Home" reveals that Charlie's given name is in fact Celeste Middleton. She is the only prominent LGBT character on the show; in her first episode, she informs the brothers she is lesbian when she is asked to flirt with a male guard to gain access to a restricted area.

Charlie's first appearance is in the season seven episode "The Girl with the Dungeons and Dragons Tattoo", where Dick Roman asks her to decrypt Frank Devereaux's hard drive. Once she succeeds, she starts reading files describing the Leviathans and their activities, including their connection to Dick Roman. Although she doesn't believe it at first, she realizes the truth when she witnesses a leviathan eat her supervisor and shapeshift to replace him—something Dick explains they cannot do to Charlie, as she possesses a rare "spark" that can't be perfectly replicated. Sam and Dean recruit a terrified Charlie to retrieve Frank's hard drive to protect the information there, as well as to break into Dick's office and hack his emails to gain information for their side. She does so, which alerts Sam and Dean to a secret package meant for Dick which they then steal; the package is later revealed to hold the secret to defeating the leviathan. She is nearly killed when Dick realizes her duplicity, but is saved by Bobby's ghost holding the leviathan off—breaking Charlie's arm in the process—whilst Sam and Dean arrive and rescue her. She leaves after telling Sam and Dean not to contact her again.

Charlie reappears in the season eight episode "LARP and the Real Girl". Now under a different alias, Carrie Heinlein, she is the queen of one of four kingdoms of the LARPing game of Moondoor. When two of her "subjects" are killed, it draws Sam and Dean's attention and they head to Moondoor. Charlie's initial reaction is to flee and start a new life again, fearing that she will once more become a target for monsters. After learning why Sam and Dean are there, she agrees to help them investigate the deaths and other mysterious injuries that have happened. Charlie is eventually captured by a good fairy named Gilda who has kidnapped her on her master's orders. Charlie is instantly smitten with Gilda. Dean, Sam and Gerry eventually find Charlie with help from the "prisoner", only to find that she is making out with Gilda. It is revealed that Gerry is Gilda's master; he has unrequited feelings for Charlie and has bought a spellbook with which to control Gilda and force her to kill other players as part of a scheme to make Charlie fall in love with him. Charlie eventually destroys the book to set Gilda free and render Gerry powerless. Afterward, she and Gilda share a goodbye kiss before Gilda returns to her world with Gerry to have Gerry punished. Charlie decides to stop running and changing her identity and to stay and make a life for once. She tells Sam and Dean to call her if they ever need her help again. The three of them participate in a mock battle between their group and the other LARPers, which Charlie's side wins. Charlie's backstory is explored when she returns in "Pac-Man Fever" to give Sam and Dean a case. After she proves to be an excellent shot, Dean takes her as his (temporary) partner instead of Sam, who has become increasingly ill from the trials. Charlie is eventually captured by the creature they are hunting, a type of djinn, who poisons Charlie and places her in a nightmare from which she won't wake up from. In her nightmare, she is trapped in a video game she stole as a kid, recreated, and gave out for free, and where she must endlessly protect her hospitalized mother from super-soldier vampires. It is revealed that her parents had been involved in a car accident when driving over to pick Charlie up from a sleepover, resulting in her father dying and her mother rendered brain-dead. Charlie has been paying for the care of her mother, whom she refuses to let go due to her feelings of guilt over the accident. When Dean takes a potion to enter her nightmare himself to save her, he convinces Charlie that she must let her mother go to move on. She then wakes up and in the episode's last scene, takes Dean's advice by having her mother taken off of life-support after reading The Hobbit aloud to her like her mother did to Charlie as a little girl.

Charlie is called in by the Winchesters for help in the ninth-season episode "Slumber Party" to reconfigure an ancient computer at the Men of Letters' bunker. A childhood fan of L. Frank Baum's Oz books, Charlie is excited when the real Dorothy is found in the bunker. The group works together to try to find a way to defeat The Wicked Witch of the West. Charlie dies to protect Dean from the Witch, but he has Gadreel bring her back to life and tells her that she had only been knocked out, though she learns the truth anyway from Dorothy; Charlie later agrees to keep her death and subsequent resurrection a secret from Sam so long as Dean agrees to one day explain what had really happened. Charlie and Dorothy eventually devise a way to kill the Witch, but are attacked by Sam and Dean, who are both possessed by the Witch. While Dorothy holds the brothers off, Charlie finds and kills the Witch by stabbing in the head with Oz's famous ruby slippers before the Witch can let her army in through a portal to Oz. When Dorothy extends an offer to Charlie to come with her to Oz, Charlie jumps at the prospect of finally getting the kind of magic and adventure she wants. After bidding their goodbyes to the brothers, Charlie and Dorothy cross over to Oz, leaving Sam and Dean to speculate if and when they will come back.

In the season 10 episode "There's No Place Like Home", Sam and Dean find out that Charlie is back from Oz and is attacking people who helped cover up her parents deaths. To their surprise, they find there are two Charlie's, a good and a dark Charlie. The good Charlie explains that she and Dorothy fought a war in Oz to free it from evil and to win, Charlie made a deal with the Wizard of Oz to split herself into her good and dark sides. Charlie's dark side single-handedly won the war and Dorothy and the Wizard now lead Oz. Now, dark Charlie has come to Earth seeking revenge for her parents deaths, good Charlie following to stop her. As dark Charlie broke the Key to Oz so Charlie couldn't return, she and Sam investigate the Key in hopes of finding a way to fix it, and eventually track down a former Man of Letters named Clive Dylan who was trapped in Oz after discovering the Key. Dean meanwhile tries to protect Russell Wellington, the man who killed Charlie's parents, but Dark Charlie tricks Dean, kills Russell, and follows Dean to Clive's house where they fight and he brutally beats her, hurting Good Charlie who is still connected to her. At the same time, Sam and Charlie learn that the Wizard is in fact Clive's dark side, split from him as Charlie's was. Unable to fix the Key and to save Oz, Clive shoots himself to force the Wizard to Earth to heal Clive and save himself. Unable to defeat the Wizard, Clive signals Charlie to shoot him which she hesitantly does, killing Clive and the Wizard. Sam stops Dean from beating Dark Charlie to death and proceeds to reverse the Wizard's spell and reunite the two Charlies. Afterwards, Charlie, unable to return to Oz, decides to dedicate herself to finding a way to save Dean from the Mark of Cain and forgives his actions.

Charlie returns to the brothers several episodes later, having found an ancient book known as the Book of the Damned, which is said to document every curse as well as their cures. Upon acquiring the book, a group of unknown men, all with the same tattoo on their wrist, begin to pursue her. After a violent encounter with them, Charlie is shot but narrowly escapes, and calls the Winchesters from a telephone booth, informing them of her discovery and injury, mentioning she sewed it back together with dental floss, a testament to her resourcefulness. When reunited, Sam and Charlie begin their attempt to decipher the book's text, as it is written in an unknown ancient language, but Dean insists they stop, and destroy the book entirely, worrying that the Mark will cause him to use its information to do evil. Sam and Charlie decide not to destroy it but to put it away in a curse box, which will prevent anyone from tracking it down. Meanwhile, Dean goes to find Charlie's pursuers, who Sam had determined to be members of the historically prominent Styne family. When they attack the house Charlie and the Winchesters had been staying at, Dean instructs Sam to destroy the book before the men can take it. Sam throws the book in the fire, and the trio defeats and kills their attackers. However, it is later revealed he threw another book in, and hid the real book in hopes he could still cure Dean, despite his brother's wishes. When Charlie, Sam and Dean return to the bunker, they are greeted by Castiel, and Charlie is excited to meet him for the first time. Upon hugging him, she comments she had expected him to be shorter. At Charlie's joking request, Castiel heals her carpal tunnel and even her bullet wound without being asked, having gotten his full power back. The four then have a dinner, laughing and enjoying each other's company.

In "Dark Dynasty", Charlie is called in by Sam to work with Rowena on how to translate the Book of the Damned. Charlie is stunned that Sam lied about destroying the Book and reluctantly agrees to work on translating the Book behind Dean's back. However, Charlie is forced to work with Rowena who annoys her greatly with her disgust at Charlie being a nerd instead of a witch and her insistence that they are similar. Unable to take it anymore, Charlie asks Castiel to let her go cool off for a while and slips out while he ties up Rowena in another room. Going to a motel, Charlie continues her efforts to translate the Book of the Damned and finally manages to crack the code just before Eldon Styne arrives. Charlie contacts Sam and Dean, who tell her to give him the Book which she doesn't have, or her notes to save her life. However, unwilling to betray her friends or give the Styne Family the power of the Book, Charlie smashes her Surface and is killed by Eldon. A devastated Sam and Dean find her body soon afterwards. However, unknown to them, Charlie's last act was to email Sam her notes on how to translate the Book, giving them the chance to finish what she started.

In "The Prisoner", following her death, Sam and Dean cremate Charlie in hunter's tradition and Dean decides to slaughter the Stynes in revenge, telling Sam to stop the work on the Book. Sam initially does until he receives Charlie's email and decides to continue. Dean brutally slaughters the Styne family for what they did to Charlie and ultimately kills Eldon, avenging her.

=== Claire Novak ===
Claire Novak, portrayed as a child by Sydney Imbeau and later in the series as a young adult by Kathryn Newton, is the daughter of Jimmy and Amelia Novak. She is raised in Pontiac, Illinois, until roughly the age of eleven, when her mother disappears, overwhelmed by grief of her father's death. Claire is then left in the custody of her grandmother until her death, at which point she is moved between numerous foster homes and eventually placed in a juvenile center.

Eight-year-old Claire is first introduced, along with her mother, in the season four episode "The Rapture", where the story of Jimmy becoming Castiel's vessel is revealed. Her first appearance occurs after Castiel is shown taking possession of Jimmy. Claire runs outside frantically and asks "Daddy?" to which Castiel replies that he is not her father, and begins to walk away, as she watches him leave. A year later when Castiel is forced out of Jimmy's body, Jimmy is able to return and begins to try and rebuild his life with his family. This is short lived, as demons learn about Jimmy, and take his wife and daughter hostage.

Claire is possessed by Castiel when her parents, Dean, and Sam Winchester, are held captive by demons, her mother having been possessed so that the demons could watch Jimmy and determine his unique qualities as a vessel. Castiel, in Claire's body, expels two demons from their hosts during the fight. Castiel intends to let Jimmy die so that he will go to Heaven and be at peace as a reward for his service, but Jimmy begs Castiel to use him as a vessel and free his daughter. Castiel obliges.

Seven years later, Castiel is inspired to look into Jimmy Novak's old life after recent events with Hannah. He discovers that Claire is in solitary confinement in a juvenile center after attempting the latest of a series of escapes, prompting him to visit and get her out by posing as Jimmy. Claire reveals that her mother vanished after leaving her with her grandmother, and she has been in and out of homes since her grandmother's death, blaming Castiel for breaking her family apart by taking her father as a vessel. Castiel helps her escape the center, but Claire steals his wallet and runs away again to rejoin with Dustin and Randy, friends of hers who were expecting her to collect money to help settle Randy's gambling debts.

The Winchesters and Castiel arrive in time to prevent the robbery, but Claire leaves them in disgust, declaring that Dustin and Randy are her family while the three men are just the people who killed her father. However, when Randy's loan shark offers to take Claire to compensate for the debt, Randy agrees, forcing the Winchesters and Castiel to step in and save her. They arrive at the house and are surprised to not see her, but when they hear screams coming from upstairs, they know she is in fact in the house, and in danger. Castiel locates her and busts down the door of the room where the loan shark is attempting to rape her.

Despite the Winchesters and Castiel saving her, Claire makes it clear that she still doesn't trust them, and resists Castiel's efforts to help her. After being brought to the bunker, she runs away, and meets a couple who suggest that she kill Dean as the person responsible for her father's death, helping them arrange a trap for him. However, she tips Dean off at the last minute, finding herself unable to go through with the plan, and he manages to fight them off and spare their lives despite the corrupting influence of the Mark of Cain. Although Claire still intends to leave Castiel and find a new life on her own, she suggests that she would not be against him keeping in touch with her.

Months later, in "Angel Heart", Claire is now eighteen and has begun searching for her long-missing mother, tracking her to Tulsa, Oklahoma. Claire confronts Ronnie Cartwright, the last person to see her mother and is knocked unconscious. As Castiel is in the emergency contacts on her cell phone, the hospital calls him and he calls in Sam and Dean to help him deal with her. After learning what she is up to, the Winchesters and Castiel decide to help her but she escapes the hospital and returns to her motel room where she finds Sam waiting for her while Dean and Castiel have gone to interrogate Ronnie. Sam offers to help Claire hack her mother's credit card records which she is intrigued by and with what they learn from that combined with what Castiel and Dean learn from Ronnie, they track Amelia to a farm run by a faith healer named Peter Holloway. However, Dean and Claire are left behind as they don't want Claire getting hurt and the Mark of Cain's influence on Dean is getting worse. While initially awkward for Dean and Claire, they bond over mini-golf and Claire inadvertently gives Dean a clue that they aren't dealing with a normal angel. Searching through the lore, Claire discovers that Holloway is a Grigori, a class of angel that preys on humanity. When they are unable to reach Sam and Castiel, Dean allows Claire to join him in the rescue, even giving her a gun. Claire and Dean find Castiel who has rescued a weak Amelia. Claire and her mother are finally reunited and Claire tearfully embraces her rather than berating her like she'd planned. While Claire tries to help Amelia out of the barn, Holloway, revealed to be Tamiel, comes and tells her that Amelia is beyond saving. Claire attempts to kill him with the gun and when she fails, he tries to kill her. Amelia sacrifices herself to save her daughter, leaving Claire devastated. Sam, Dean and Castiel are unable to defeat Tamiel so Claire kills him herself with his own sword to save them and avenge her mother. The next day, the three decide to send her to Jody Mills until she can get on her feet and she forgives Dean and Castiel for their roles in Jimmy's death, taking with her a gift Castiel gave her for her birthday. Dean takes back the gun, but leaves her Caddyshack and a lore book as he noticed her take Tamiel's sword and realizes she intends to become a hunter. Claire hugs Castiel goodbye, finally accepting him as her new father figure.

She goes to live with Jody Mills and appears in season 11's "Don't You Forget About Me", she is trying to be a hunter but is mentioned to have caused trouble in town, due to her hunting but doesn't face jail because of her adoptive mother being sheriff. As seen in the Winchesters' visit, she is still rebellious and tends to cause trouble for her adoptive sister Alex. While she maintains a distancing attitude to them, Dean tells her that Jody is doing her best to care for her and she starts to see his point. When she and Jody are captured by vengeful vampires one of them being Alex's boyfriend, Claire breaks free and protects them as the Winchesters arrive to save them. Claire helps Alex in killing Henry. After the attack, she accepts them as family and even tries to make breakfast though the food was burnt. In subsequent episodes, Claire and Alex are shown to have a much better relationship despite still bickering with each other.

In season 12's "Ladies Drink Free", Claire has become a full-time hunter, but lies to Jody that she is checking out colleges as she feels Jody is holding her back too much when they hunt together as Jody is somewhat overprotective. While hunting a werewolf with Mick Davies of the British Men of Letters, the Winchesters learn that Claire is on the same hunt and they team up together. By posing as a high school student, Claire is able to learn from one of the victims best friend that the girl was dating someone who creeped her friend out. Shortly afterwards, the werewolf attacks Claire in broad daylight and bites her.

Frightened, Claire begs to be killed as she doesn't believe she can control herself when she inevitably transforms, but Sam suggests trying an experimental cure created by the British Men of Letters instead. Though it has never worked on a human, Claire agrees to try it and is left with Mick as the Winchesters go to find the werewolf. As the transformation begins, Claire begs Mick to kill her, but he refuses. The two are attacked by the werewolf who is revealed to be the friendly local bartender, Justin, who abducts Claire. Justin reveals to Claire that he was once part of a peaceful pack, but after it was wiped out by the British Men of Letters, he was driven insane with loneliness and is now seeking out a mate. As Claire struggles with both Justin and her instincts, the Winchesters and Mick arrive thanks to a tracking device Mick planted on Claire. In the fight that follows, a completely feral Claire attacks Dean, but he subdues her. Mick and Sam manage to extract Justin's live blood before killing him and Dean injects Claire with the werewolf cure. Claire experiences excruciating agony over a prolonged period of time before appearing to die. Moments later, Claire's transformation reverses itself and she wakes up completely human. The next morning, Claire calls Jody and leaves her a voicemail telling Jody the truth. Claire decides to keep hunting on her own for the time being, but assures Jody that she is ready now thanks to Jody being her mother.

In "There's Something About Mary" and "Who We Are", Claire appears as one of the British Men of Letters primary targets when they plan to wipe out all of the American hunters. However, the British operation is destroyed by a team of American hunters led by Sam and Jody before this can happen.

In season 13's "Wayward Sisters", a more experienced Claire hunts a small werewolf pack that has kidnapped a young girl. Disguised as a delivery person, Claire single-handedly kills all three werewolves, rescues the girl and returns her to her mother. Afterwards, Claire receives a call from Jody that the Winchesters have disappeared and Jody needs her help. Claire returns to Sioux Falls where she is skeptical of Patience Turner's claims that she has had a vision of Claire's death. With Alex's help, Claire locates dreamwalker Kaia Nieves, only to be attacked by a strange monster. With Jody's help, Claire kills the monster which Kaia reveals comes from an alternate reality known as The Bad Place. With Kaia having been trying to help the Winchesters open a door to another world, Claire realizes that a door to The Bad Place is still open.

Under attack by the creatures, the group flees and links up with Sheriff Donna Hanscum for backup. Due to Patience's vision, Jody convinces a reluctant Claire to stay behind. As Claire bonds with Kaia, she grows worried enough to lead the other girls after Jody and Donna. Claire arrives in time to kill one of the creatures with a flamethrower and save Jody and Donna's lives. Finding the rift on the verge of closing, Jody agrees to allow Claire to go through with Kaia and stop overprotecting her. Claire and Kaia manage to rescue the Winchesters in The Bad Place, but are ambushed by a cloaked figure who throws a spear at Claire, killing Kaia when she saves Claire's life. With a giant monster approaching and the rift about to close, the Winchesters drag a reluctant Claire back through the rift which closes moments later. A devastated Claire is comforted by Jody, the true ending to Patience's vision. Claire is left devastated by losing Kaia and later joins her family for dinner, vowing revenge upon Kaia's killer even if she has to find a way to open another rift to The Bad Place. Unknown to Claire, as she sits down to a dinner, a rift from The Bad Place opens and brings Kaia's killer to the Winchesters world. Kaia's killer is revealed to be the alternate reality version of Kaia from The Bad Place.

In season 14's "The Scar", Jody and the Winchesters track down Kaia's killer while searching for a way to defeat the alternate reality Michael. Having thought a string of recent murders was a human killer, Jody initially keeps Claire out of the case for that reason and then because Claire, who was in love with Kaia, is obsessed with revenge against her killer. After catching Kaia's killer, dubbed Dark Kaia, the three learn of her identity as Kaia's alternate counterpart who admits that Kaia's death was an accident as she was aiming for Claire. After a confrontation with some of Michael's monsters, Dark Kaia escapes after saving the group's life, leaving Jody to wonder how to explain what happened to Claire.

In season 15's "Galaxy Brain", the Winchesters and Jody encounter Dark Kaia yet again who reveals that The Bad Place is dying and that Kaia is in fact still alive, trapped in The Bad Place after surviving her wound. Jody attempts to call Claire to inform her of the development, but can't reach her and they are left with no time to wait for Claire to help them rescue Kaia. Jody tells Castiel that Claire has been obsessed with hunting Dark Kaia for revenge for two years and is ironically out of cellphone range in Yosemite chasing a woman in a black cloak when they finally get Dark Kaia. The two believe that Claire won't survive if she learns that they had a chance to save Kaia and failed to save her and Castiel convinces Jody to remain behind so that Claire doesn't lose her too. With the help of Dark Kaia and Jack, the Winchesters return to The Bad Place and rescue Kaia. Dark Kaia chooses to remain behind in The Bad Place as it is destroyed by God, dying with her homeworld. In the aftermath, Kaia accepts an invitation to return to Sioux Falls with Jody and asks after Claire who Jody promises will be home soon.

=== Donna Hanscum ===
Sheriff Donna Hanscum (portrayed by Briana Buckmaster) is the sheriff of Stillwater, Minnesota who, while at first oblivious to the supernatural, became a hunter after two encounters with it. She first appears in "The Purge" when Sam and Dean investigate mysterious deaths where overweight people are drained of most of their fat. Donna is portrayed as an overweight woman who has recently been granted a divorce from a man who dumped her for her weight. She helps Sam and Dean early in the investigation, but then goes to a health spa where the owner, a pishtaco, feeds on her fat, causing her to lose ten pounds, something she attributes to fire cupping. Donna, slightly stoned from the roofies she was given, inadvertently blows Sam and Dean's cover at the spa and explains her weight loss to them. After the case is over, Sam and Dean attribute it to a psychopathic serial killer, something Donna accepts.

Several months later, during "Hibbing 911", Donna goes to a sheriff's retreat in Hibbing, Minnesota, her hometown where she meets Sheriff Jody Mills. The two are partnered up during the retreat and Jody tries to keep Donna out of the case where people are completely consumed by an unknown monster except for their bones. In turn, Donna is annoyed when Jody defends her from her husband who is extremely rude to her and unknowingly makes a rude comment about Jody's own lost husband, something Donna immediately regrets when she realizes what she's done. Donna later sees Sam and Dean who Jody called in and is surprised to recognize them while Jody is shocked to realize Donna knows her friends. Donna eventually finds Sheriff Len Cues over another victim and sees that he is a monster, more specifically a vampire, shocking her. She tells Jody about it and they break into Len's room where Donna finds a clue about the location of the vampire's nest. When Sam and Dean arrive, they are forced to tell Donna the truth about what's going on in Hibbing and what happened in Stillwater. Donna insists on going with them and with the support of Jody, she successfully convinces them to let her go along, though she is a bit unsettled at the idea of having to decapitate the vampires to kill them. The group is captured by the vampires and their leader, Starr, explains that Len used to be their leader, having taught them to use all parts of their prey, before growing a conscience and leaving them. The vampires were trying to lure Len back and when he refuses, Starr kills him. Dean breaks free and kills two of the three vampires, but Starr goes after Jody. Donna, who broke one of the lenses of her glasses and used it to cut herself free, decapitates Starr, saving Jody and quipping "Hakuna Matata, lady." Later, Donna discusses the experience with Jody, saying that knowing monsters are out there makes the world seem bigger and darker. Jody, complimenting Donna's actions, offers to train her to be a hunter, something Donna accepts.

Donna later reappears in Plush, calling in the Winchesters after a man in a bunny mask murdered a local man and the mask won't come off. When her deputy, Doug, is forced to kill the young man, Donna is left horrified as the mask appears to be a cursed object, making the young man another innocent victim. Donna burns the mask and it appears to be over, but a young woman in a court jester's outfit attacks the local football coach and the Winchesters learn that they are dealing with an angry ghost, not a cursed object. Dean is able to break the ghost's possession of the young woman and Donna makes up a story and lets her go as she's innocent. As the Winchesters talk to Rita Johnson, the woman who donated all of the possessed costumes, Donna distracts her son Max. Afterwards, the Winchesters inform her it is the ghost of Chester Johnson, a children's performer who committed suicide a couple of months before. When told that they need to locate and burn the costumes, Donna offers to deal with that with Doug. She is later called by Sam after another possessed victim murders the coach who was in a coma. Donna and Doug locate all of the costumes and burn them, but when Donna calls Sam, he learns she never found a deer's head mask. After Chester's spirit is destroyed, Donna visits the Johnson house with Doug and the Winchesters tell her that as she now has three cases under her belt, she is an official hunter to her great joy. After they leave, Donna apologizes to Doug for her treatment of him due to her bad experience with her ex-husband Doug who was also a cop. Doug forgives her, telling Donna he has baggage too and the two are able to joke around with each other comfortably.

Two years later in "Wayward Sisters", Donna is called in by Jody Mills to act as backup to help rescue the Winchesters from the alternate reality known as The Bad Place. Now a full-fledged hunter, Donna is stated to have "killed a lot of vampires" and possesses an impressive arsenal in her truck. Donna helps figure out the location of the rift between worlds and battles creatures from The Bad Place alongside Jody, her daughter Alex, Claire Novak and Patience Turner. After the rescue is successful, Donna sits down to dinner with Jody's family.

A few weeks later in "Breakdown", Donna's niece Wendy goes missing. Even though all signs point to a human bad guy, Donna calls the Winchesters for help and they come to her aid alongside Doug who is now her boyfriend. The group determines that Wendy has been kidnapped by a serial abductor called the Butterfly and work together with FBI agent Terrance Clegg to try to solve the case. Along the way, Donna is forced to tell Doug the truth about monsters and her hunting lifestyle when they discover that the victims are being chopped up and sold as parts for monsters. After Doug gets turned into a vampire, Donna kneecaps his sire and forces him to divulge the location of the harvesting operation while Dean manages to cure Doug. Donna then rescues Wendy, killing the Butterfly's accomplice in the process while Dean rescues Sam and kills the Butterfly, who was Agent Clegg all along. In the aftermath, while Doug acknowledges the necessity of Donna's hunting, he becomes frightened by what he has seen and breaks up with Donna, leaving her heartbroken.

In season 14's "Nightmare Logic", Mary Winchester and the alternate Bobby Singer retreat to Donna's cabin for some down time following a hunt that brings up bad memories for Bobby.

In "Damaged Goods", Dean visits with Donna on his way to her cabin to see his mother. Donna tells him that her breakup with Doug has been hard on her with Doug leaving the police force and going into private security. Donna notices Dean's strange behavior and realizes that something is wrong. Later, a suspicious grocery store clerk calls Donna about Nick searching for Mary. Donna pulls Nick over in a stolen van and learns from Nick's fingerprints about Nick being wanted for his murder spree. Nick knocks Donna out with a stun gun and learns Mary's location from Donna's cell phone, but leaves her unconscious in the front seat of her police car rather than harming her further. Upon waking up, Donna calls Dean and warns him of the threat Nick poses. Donna's police department helps them track down Nick through his stolen van and Donna acts as a police escort to the storage unit where Nick is unleashing Abraxas. After Nick kills Abraxas, Donna shoots Nick in the leg to keep him from harming Mary and arrests Nick for his murder spree.

=== Eileen Leahy ===
Eileen Leahy, portrayed by Shoshannah Stern, is an Irish hunter and Men of Letters Legacy.

In 1985, when Eileen was a baby, a Banshee attacked her house and murdered her parents. Before dying, Eileen's mother managed to banish the Banshee with a spell, saving Eileen's life but leaving her deaf. Eileen was eventually found and raised by a hunter named Lillian O'Grady who died of cancer when Eileen was sixteen.

In "Into the Mystic", Eileen tracks the Banshee that killed her parents to a retirement home in Kansas where she encounters the Winchesters. Disguised as a maid, Eileen comes to the mistaken impression that the Winchesters are Banshees and attacks Sam before they can sort it all out. The Winchesters learn that Eileen's grandfather was a Man of Letters, making her a Legacy like them. With the help of the Winchesters and Mildred Barker, Eileen finally kills the Banshee and get her revenge. However, Eileen decided to remain a hunter rather than return to a normal life.

In "The British Invasion", Eileen's help was enlisted by the Winchesters in finding Kelly Kline. Eileen eventually tracked down a demon working for the Prince of Hell Dagon and got Kelly's phone number from him before killing the demon with an angel blade. Eileen took part in the mission to capture Kelly Kline and attempted to kill Dagon with the Colt. However, Eileen missed and accidentally killed British Men of Letters operative Renny Rawlings. The Winchesters stop Mick Davies from killing a distraught Eileen and she chose to return to Ireland for a while, but not before leaving the Winchesters the Colt.

In "There's Something About Mary", Eileen is killed by a hellhound loyal to British Men of Letters assassin Arthur Ketch in South Carolina. The Winchesters learn of Eileen's death from Jody Mills and are confused and suspicious as Eileen is supposed to be in Ireland. They later receive a letter sent by Eileen four days before her death stating she believed that the British Men of Letters were following her and tapping her computer and phone. Eileen's letter causes the Winchesters to check the bunker and find Arthur Ketch's monitoring equipment. After capturing Lady Toni Bevell, the Winchesters question whether the British operation is responsible for Eileen's death. While Toni doesn't know who Eileen is, she confirms the high likelihood that she was killed by the British Men of Letters, stating that if the organization is suspected of killing someone, they likely did.

In season 15's "Golden Time", Eileen returns as a ghost, revealing that the hellhound dragged her soul to Hell when she was killed. Having escaped from Hell when God released all of the souls of Hell upon the world, Eileen seeks Sam and Dean's help in getting into Heaven, knowing that she will eventually go insane as a ghost. However, the Winchesters have learned that once a soul has been condemned to Hell, it cannot enter Heaven. Instead, Dean sends Sam to seek out Rowena's journals so they can create a Soul Catcher to contain Eileen. At Rowena's apartment, Sam discovers a spell Rowena had created to resurrect Mary Winchester which he realizes will work on Eileen also. After witches attack, Eileen is banished, but gets Dean to help Sam. Eileen battles a witch's ghost until Dean puts the witch's soul to rest. Afterwards, Sam uses Rowena's spell to resurrect Eileen.

=== Garth Fitzgerald IV ===
Garth Fitzgerald IV, portrayed by DJ Qualls, is a hunter who generally works alone, although he has teamed up with the Winchester brothers on two occasions. Since Bobby's death and Sam and Dean's subsequent year-long absence, he has taken on Bobby's role as hunter coordinator, although he remains mobile where Bobby maintained a 'home base', carrying various cell phones around with him; he has even started wearing Bobby's hat and attempting to imitate Bobby's old phrases, although this has met with variable success. As part of this, he has started to track hunters via the GPS in their cell phones and assign them cases, something that creeps Sam out but Dean says is "very Bobby." Garth reveals that before he became a hunter, he was working to become a dentist and killed the Tooth Fairy on his first case.

Garth eventually disappears sometime after "Taxi Driver" and is found by Sam and Dean in "Sharp Teeth" where he reveals that he was turned into a werewolf on a hunt two months before his disappearance and hid it. Garth has joined a pack of werewolves that peacefully coexist with humans and married one named Bess. After Sam and Dean find him, he introduces them to the pack and tries to convince them that everything is fine, however, members of the pack worship Fenris and want to rule over humanity. To this end, they kidnap, Garth, Bess and Sam, planning to murder Garth and Bess and frame Sam and Dean to goad the pack into returning to their old beliefs and bring about Ragnarok. Before the plot can be carried out, Dean comes to their rescue and kills the three werewolves involved. In the aftermath, Garth, who is upset to learn of Kevin's death and blames himself as he wasn't there for him, offers to return to hunting using his new powers to help fight. However, Dean recognizes that not all of the werewolves are bad and tells Garth to stay with his new family where he has found happiness.

Needing help to discover Michael's plans, Garth returns in "The Spear", offering to go undercover and infiltrate the rogue Archangel's ranks as a werewolf seeking an enhancement. Having been briefed by Sam, he intended to fake taking the serum, but is later forced to consume it. Overwhelmed, he later attacks the approaching hunters, forcing Sam to subdue him and lock Garth in the Impala's trunk. Sam suggests that Michael was spying on them through his connection to Garth and they hope that killing Michael will free Garth from his control. Garth remains locked in the trunk throughout "Nihilism" with subsequent events preventing the original plan to retrieve Garth until after Michael is defeated and locked away in Dean's mind.

In season 15's "The Heroes' Journey", Garth calls the Winchesters in for help after Bess' cousin Brad is found badly wounded by a Wraith. Garth is shown to have three children and named the youngest two after Sam and Castiel. With Sam and Dean now experiencing normal people problems, Garth and Bess help treat Dean's seventeen cavities and Sam's illness, Garth having become a dentist since he retired. After learning of the war with God, Garth suggests that as Sam and Dean were the heroes of God's story, he had protected them from such mundane issues but has since downgraded them to normal people since the Winchesters have fallen out of favor with God. Though Garth guesses that he's only a special guest star in the story, he suggests that its better than being the hero. When the Winchesters go after the monster fight club, they leave Garth behind rather than risk his normal life. However, Garth later shows up to rescue them, infiltrating the fight club and using C4 to blow it all up. This and Garth saving them from the massive vampire Maul causes the Winchesters to suggest that Garth is the hero of the story this time. Garth directs the Winchesters to a place he has heard rumors of in Alaska where they might be able to regain their normal abilities and dances with Bess as they drive away.

=== Gordon Walker ===
Gordon Walker, portrayed by Sterling K. Brown, is a vampire hunter whose methods often put him at odds with the Winchester brothers. Gordon focuses on eliminating the supernatural simply because it isn't human, where the Winchesters are more willing to tolerate supernatural entities that are not actively killing humans. Gordon takes pleasure in considering himself a killer who freely resorts to torture, where Sam and Dean regard themselves as Hunters who only kill when they must and do nothing to their enemies that the situation doesn't force upon them.

When Gordon was 18 years old, a vampire broke into his house and abducted his sister. Gordon ran away from home, learned how to fight, hunt, and kill vampires, and tracked down the vampire who had taken his sister. He killed the vampire, and his sister, who had been turned, marking the beginning of his hatred for the undead. At some point during his career as a hunter, Gordon met John Winchester and Ellen Harvelle. Ellen described him as a skilled hunter in the sense that Hannibal Lecter is a good psychiatrist, being good at his job but dangerous to everyone else around him.

Gordon is introduced in the episode "Bloodlust", meeting up with Sam and Dean while hunting a nest of vampires. At first, Dean bonds with Gordon, but Gordon proves himself to be bloodthirsty and sadistic as he tortures one of the captured vampires, even though he knows these particular vampires feed off cattle blood and do not kill humans. After Gordon tries to force one of the vampires to drink Sam's blood while torturing her with dead man's blood, Dean, seeing the vampire resist the urge, ends up beating Gordon in a fight and leaves Gordon tied to a chair while the vampires escape. Later, while performing an exorcism, Gordon learns about the coming demonic war, Azazel's special children, and Sam's powers. In "Hunted", he kills Scott Carey- another of the 'special children'- and then tracks Sam down and tries to kill him, convinced that Sam and those like him are 'traitors' to humanity. However, Dean intervenes, and, after a scuffle, Gordon knocks Dean out, ties him up, and uses him as bait to catch Sam in a booby trap of grenades set with trip wires. Sam manages to evade the trap and knocks Gordon out. As the brothers leave the damaged house, Gordon regains consciousness and chases them, firing two pistols in their direction. The police arrive to subdue Gordon, based on an anonymous tip from Sam, and find his cache of weapons in his car.

In "Bad Day at Black Rock", Gordon is shown to be in prison, where he convinces a visiting fellow hunter to go after Sam Winchester, convinced that Sam was involved in the opening of the Devil's Trap regardless of Bobby's claims that Sam was actually trying to stop it. Gordon eventually escapes from prison and, once again, pursues the Winchester brothers in "Fresh Blood". However, he is captured and subsequently turned by a vampire. Gordon, however, turns on his sire, kills two other vampires, and then sets up a trap for the Winchester brothers, still convinced it is his duty as a hunter to rid the world of Sam Winchester. A fight ensues in a warehouse where Gordon holds a girl he has kidnapped—and turned—to use as bait, ending with Sam decapitating him with a garotte improvised out of razor wire.

According to series creator Eric Kripke, Gordon was originally going to learn about the hunter Sam killed while possessed and use it to convince more hunters to turn against Sam. This was intended to be a story arc stretching over multiple episodes. However, Sterling K. Brown was contracted for the Lifetime Television series Army Wives, and Lifetime would only allow him to return to Supernatural for two more episodes.

=== Gwen Campbell ===
Gwen Campbell, portrayed by Jessica Heafey, is a hunter and third cousin related to Sam and Dean's mother's side of the family. When Sam re-enters Dean's life in "Exile on Main Street", he reveals that he has been back for a year and hunting with the Campbells, including Gwen. She and the others assist the brothers in defeating a Djinn. Gwen is present at the compound in "Two and a Half Men" when the brothers arrive with a baby Shapeshifter, and is overpowered, along with the others, when the Alpha Shapeshifter arrives. When hunting the Alpha Vampire in "Family Matters", she is ordered to stay behind and flush out any stragglers with Dean. She and Dean fight well together, and she covers for Dean when he disobeys orders. However, she sides with Samuel at the end of the episode when she holds the Winchesters at gunpoint, and follows him even when it is revealed that he has been working for Crowley. She is next seen in "...And Then There Were None", hunting with Samuel. While investigating a series of murders, they encounter Bobby, Rufus, Sam and Dean. Gwen tells Dean that she did not know that Samuel had betrayed them to Crowley. The creature responsible for the deaths—dubbed the Khan Worm—infects Dean, who kills Gwen.

=== Henry Winchester ===
Henry Winchester, played by Gil McKinney, is John Winchester's father, Sam and Dean's grandfather and a member of the secret society known as the Men of Letters. Vanishing in 1958, Henry was believed by his son to have run out on his family.

==== In Supernatural ====
In "As Time Goes By", on August 12, 1958, the night of Henry's official initiation into the Men of Letters, the order is attacked by the demon Abaddon who is possessing Henry's friend Josie Sands. As the demon slaughters everyone else, Henry is given a mysterious box by surviving Men of Letters Elder Larry Ganem and ordered to protect it from Abaddon. Escaping through time, Henry ends up coming out of his grandsons' motel room closet in the year 2013, having overshot his attempt to get help from John closer to his own time. Henry's arrival and search for John creates much confusion for the Winchesters who only knew of him as their grandfather who had supposedly run out on John when he was four. Henry reveals to Sam and Dean their family's history with the Men of Letters, a family legacy going back centuries that the Winchesters had been unaware of as Henry hadn't been around to pass it on to John and the order had been wiped out by Abaddon. However, Henry expresses disgust that his grandsons are hunters due to having a low view of hunters in general. Learning of his son's fate, Henry attempts to travel back in time and change things, but he is stopped by Dean. At the same time, Sam learns from Larry Ganem that the box contains a key that opens a veritable supernatural treasure trove that must never fall into Abaddon's hands. After the demon captures Sam, Dean agrees to trade Henry and the box for Sam, but the two men conspire together to defeat the demon. Henry is able to trap Abaddon in Josie's body with a devil's trap bullet to the head, but he is mortally wounded in the process. Unable to kill the powerful demon, Dean takes advantage of Henry trapping her to cut the demon up and bury the pieces to forever entomb her. Henry dies in his grandsons' arms, content with his own sacrifice, apologizing for his earlier disgust of them being hunters and proclaiming that as long as the Winchesters are still around, there's still hope. He also expresses his pride in John, confident that he was a good man based on what he saw in Sam and Dean. Sam and Dean bury Henry near his friends from the Men of Letters and decide to embrace the family legacy that Henry had introduced to them.

In "Everybody Hates Hitler", the Winchesters locate the Men of Letters bunker, the place that the key Henry was guarding opens and it becomes their new base of operations.

In "Blade Runners", Sam and Dean get the attention of expelled Man of Letters Cuthbert "Magnus" Sinclair by revealing that they are Henry's grandsons. Magnus reveals that before his expulsion from the Men of Letters in 1956, he was Henry's mentor in the order. Calling Henry something of a rebel, Magnus comments that Henry would continue to visit him even after he was kicked out.

In "Mother's Little Helper", shortly before their initiation into the Men of Letters, Henry and Josie are sent to investigate possible demonic possessions at a convent. This field mission is their final test before their official initiation, but Henry expresses doubts about joining the order and the dangers that come with it. It's also implied that Josie harbors unrequited romantic feelings for Henry. Unbeknownst to Henry and Josie, several of the nuns, including the Mother Superior, are possessed by Abaddon and her followers who are stealing souls for their own purposes. Henry and Josie manage to exorcise two of the demons, but prove to be no match for Abaddon who knocks Henry out. Josie manages to convince the Knight of Hell to possess her instead of Henry and the surviving demons fake a win by Henry and Josie. In reality, Abaddon plots to infiltrate and then destroy the Men of Letters. Unaware of the truth, Henry departs with Abaddon, his faith in his purpose renewed. In the present, Sam learns of these events from a nun who had witnessed what had happened and connects it to his grandfather. Confronting and killing the other remaining demon from 1958, Sam learns that the demons had been stealing souls to create their own demon army loyal only to Abaddon.

In "King of the Damned", Abaddon incapacities Crowley with a devil's trap bullet, something that she credits to learning from Henry. Abaddon also uses the time travel spell that Henry had used to escape to 2013 to kidnap Crowley's son Gavin from the past as leverage against him. In the fight that follows, Dean finally kills Abaddon with the First Blade, avenging Henry's death.

In "Family Feud", Sam mentions that Henry had previously used the spell when the Winchesters prepare to use it to return Gavin to his own time.

In "Lebanon", when a time displaced John from 2003 appears in the bunker, Sam and Dean tell him the truth about what had happened to his father and that Henry would likely be really happy to see John in the bunker.

==== In The Winchesters ====
In "Pilot", on March 23, 1972, John returns home from fighting in the Vietnam War, having managed to enlist underage by forging Henry's signature on a waiver. During his trip home, a man mysteriously appeared and then disappeared after giving John a letter from Henry telling John that if John has gotten this letter, then Henry is gone. However, there is a dangerous world out there and that the Winchester family has been involved in fighting that danger for centuries. Henry's letter provides John with an address that promises to hold the answers that John seeks and a key to it. The address turns out to be a Men of Letters clubhouse in Lawrence, Kansas where John recovers a number of his father's belongings from Henry's locker and finds himself drawn into the hunting life and the Men of Letters' fight against the Akrida. Henry's wife and John's mother Millie later admits that she knew the truth about Henry's work as a Man of Letters, but had kept it from John to protect him. Ada Monroe tells John that she knew Henry who had once come to her looking for a book about Wraiths. However, Ada doesn't know what happened to Henry or the other Men of Letters who had vanished in 1958.

In "Reflections," the Monster Club discovers notes on the Ostium and the Akrida in Henry's handwriting. In order to gain more information on the box, they summon Henry's ghost who finally gets to say goodbye to his family. Henry reveals how to recharge the Ostium using a piece of rock from the Akrida's home universe that Henry had hidden just in case the Akrida ever returned. However, their attempt to defeat the Akrida fails as they are unable to find the Akrida Queen.

In "Cast Your Fate to the Wind," John recognizes the man who gave him Henry's letter in one of Samuel Campbell's photographs. The man is revealed to be Dean Winchester, John's son and Henry's grandson.

In "Suspicious Minds," John and Mary, while dealing with former Man of Letters Jack Wilcox, discover that he was kicked out of the order because Henry had exposed him for illegal human experimentation.

In "Hey, That's No Way To Say Goodbye," in a flashback, Dean gives Henry's letter to John, much to the admonishment of Bobby Singer as they're not supposed to interfere. It remains unclear how Dean got the letter, but he simply tells Bobby that it was meant for John and he is just nudging things along. The Akrida Queen, Joan Hopkins, reveals that, after the Men of Letters defeated the Akrida in 1957, she had used the last of her power to kill them all, including Henry. After the destruction of the Akrida, Dean reveals to his parents that they are actually in an alternate universe and that they and Henry are not the John, Mary and Henry from Supernatural but their alternate counterparts.

=== Lily Sunder ===
Lily Sunder, portrayed by Alicia Witt, is a professor of apocalyptic literature turned angel hunter appearing in season 12. She reappears in season 14 portrayed by Veronica Cartwright.

In the late-nineteenth to early-twentieth century, Lily worked as a professor of apocalyptic literature and was fascinated by angels. She eventually found a spell to summon one, Ishim, who taught her the secrets of the angels. However, Ishim grew dangerously obsessed with Lily. Recognizing that Ishim was a monster, Lily left him and married the Seraphim Akobel for protection. However, in 1901, Ishim came after her for revenge. Accompanied by the angels Benjamin, Mirabel, Castiel and two others, Ishim arrived under the pretense that Lily's daughter May was a Nephilim that had to be killed. Akobel ordered Lily to run while he confronted the angels and was killed. Ishim faced Lily alone and murdered May in front of her before leaving Lily alive. Desiring revenge, Lily began using Enochian magic to give herself immortality and various powers at the cost of parts of her soul burning away each time she used them. After the Fall of the Angels in 2013, Lily took advantage of the angels' weakened state to kill two of Ishim's garrison that had participated in murdering her family over the next few years.

In 2017, in "Lily Sunder Has Some Regrets", Lily confronts Benjamin in an arcade and engages the angel in battle. After allowing Benjamin to put out a distress call, Lily kills him with an angel blade. Lily next confronts Mirabel outside of a diner where she is meeting with Ishim and Castiel, Lily's last targets. Lily quickly kills Mirabel and turns her attention to Ishim when he emerges. Lily's new powers grant her immunity to Ishim's smiting and she wounds him, but the fight is interrupted by the Winchesters and Castiel. After being wounded herself and not wanting to harm humans, Lily uses a blast of white light to blind everyone and flees in a rental car to her hotel where she heals her injuries.

After learning the story of what happened in 1901, the Winchesters track Lily down through her rental car to try to convince her not to go after Castiel. Learning that they believe May to have been a Nephilim, Lily tells them the truth about what happened. Sam and Dean believe her and Dean goes off to find Castiel while Lily stays with Sam and convinces him of the threat Ishim poses to Dean. Lily and Sam arrive as Ishim prepares to kill Dean and Lily engages Ishim in battle. Even aided by the Winchesters Lily proves to be no match for Ishim who fights through her telekinesis and prepares to kill her with his angel blade. To Lily's shock, she's saved by Castiel who kills Ishim from behind with his angel blade. Though Lily gets her revenge with Ishim's death, she is left unsure of whether or not she can let go of her vengeance against Castiel due to revenge being all she's had for over a century. Castiel apologizes to Lily and promises that if she finds she can't forgive him and wants to come after him for revenge again one day, he will be waiting for her. In tears, Lily thanks Castiel and departs, presumably off to start a new life.

In "Byzantium", Sam calls Lily for help in hopes that she can translate Kevin Tran's notes on the angel tablet and find a way to bring back the deceased Jack. Now elderly as she has stopped using the magic that prolonged her life, Lily can't read the tablet notes but offers a way to save Jack using her Enochian magic which will allow Jack's own soul to sustain him. In return, Lily asks that the Winchesters ensure her admittance into Heaven, explaining that she still has a sliver of her soul left and wishes to be reunited with her daughter when she dies. The Winchesters summon Anubis who weighs Lily's soul and determines that she will go to Hell. Anubis explains that only a person's choices determine their final destination and he can't change Lily's fate. Despite this setback, Dean convinces Lily to help them so that they won't have to experience the loss of a child as she did. Lily succeeds in helping to resurrect Jack and to cure his condition.

Moments after Jack's resurrection, Lily suffers a fatal heart attack and quietly dies. In the afterlife, Lily is greeted by Anubis who again weighs her soul and determines that Lily can now enter Heaven. Lily is implied to have known that helping Jack would be fatal to her and helped anyway and that this selfless action changed her fate. Anubis sends Lily's soul off to be reunited with her daughter at long last with Lily smiling in happiness and peace.

=== Mary Winchester ===
Mary Winchester (née Campbell), regularly portrayed by Samantha Smith but depicted by Amy Gumenick in the time travel episodes "In the Beginning" and "The Song Remains the Same" and by Meg Donnelly in the sequel series The Winchesters, is the wife of John Winchester and mother of Sam and Dean. The Season 4 episode "In the Beginning" revealed that Mary was a hunter herself and that her family had been hunters for generations. She was born in 1954 to Samuel and Deanna Campbell, both hunters, who would be her sons' namesakes.

==== In Supernatural ====
Dean, sent back in time by the angel Castiel, unknowingly brings Mary to Azazel's attention through his actions. Azazel kills her parents and then-boyfriend John Winchester, after which he bargains with Mary for John's life, offering to resurrect John if she allows him to enter her house ten years later. Not knowing Azazel's intentions, she agrees, eventually marrying John and leaving the life of a hunter. Sometime afterward, when she is pregnant with Dean, the adult Dean and Sam visit her again to warn her of Anna Milton, who intends to kill Mary before she could give birth to her sons and thus avert the Apocalypse. She is successfully protected when Michael possesses John to kill Anna, then erases Mary's memories so history remains the same. In 1980, Mary briefly returns to hunting to "tie up some loose ends". This includes traveling to Manitoba, Canada and killing a werewolf that she has some kind of history with. In the process, Mary saves the life of a young boy named Asa Fox, inspiring him to become a legendary hunter in the process.

In the pilot episode, six months after Sam's birth in 1983, Mary was awakened by sounds of him crying in his crib. She discovered Azazel there - later revealed to have been feeding Sam his demonic blood - and confronted him, but was pinned to the ceiling by him and slashed across her abdomen, eventually bursting into flames. According to "The Kids Are Alright", Azazel then killed all of her remaining friends and acquaintances, presumably so her children would not have any leads as to her death. It is revealed in "Home" that Mary has been acting as a guardian spirit of the Winchesters' old home in Lawrence, Kansas. She fights the poltergeist haunting the house and forces both spirits to leave.

As a thank-you gift for making her and God reconcile in "Alpha and Omega", the Darkness brings back Mary as she appeared at the time of her death. She is informed by Dean about the events that transpired in the 33 years since her death; to her dismay, she learns that John is dead and that her efforts to protect her family from the hunter world were futile.

In season 12, Mary struggles to adapt to the world that has changed greatly from what she once knew and the changes in her sons. Mary's struggle leads her to isolate herself from her children while her desire to create a world free of monsters leads to Mary allying with the British Men of Letters, particularly their top assassin Arthur Ketch. Mary is shown to be a hunter with formidable skills, described by Arthur as the best hunter he has ever seen. Mary herself states that she was good at hunting before she gave the life up. Mary's association with the British Men of Letters leads to her being brainwashed into a mindless assassin used to kill the American hunters. After being captured by Jody Mills, Mary's brainwashing is broken by Dean with the help of Lady Toni Bevell in time for Mary to kill Arthur Ketch and save Dean's life. Reunited with her children, Mary attends to Kelly Kline as she gives birth to Lucifer's Nephilim son Jack and sacrifices herself to trap Lucifer in the alternate reality known as Apocalypse World, trapping herself with him.

In season 13, Mary is trapped in Apocalypse World while her sons attempt to rescue her. Originally trapped with Lucifer, Mary is captured and tortured by the archangel Michael, the ruler of Apocalypse World. An attempt by her sons to rescue her leads to Lucifer's son Jack being trapped with Mary as well. Working together, Jack and Mary escape Michael's fortress and link up with some of the surviving human population led by Bobby Singer. While reminiscing with Bobby about her deceased counterpart, Mary learns that in Apocalypse World, her counterpart never made the deal with Azazel to bring back John as seen in season 4's "In The Beginning." Mary realizes that as a result, Sam and Dean never existed to stop the Apocalypse and receives comfort from Bobby that her own decision to make the deal was in fact the right one after all. Mary helps defend Bobby's colony against an angel attack led by Zachariah and together with Jack, forms a resistance against Michael as learned by Dean and a resurrected Arthur Ketch when they briefly visit Apocalypse World in "Bring 'em Back Alive".

Mary eventually returns to the original world with the refugees from 'Apocalypse World', forming a tentative relationship with the alternate Bobby as they attempt to fight the threat of the alternate Michael as he attempts to take Dean as his vessel. She is later reunited with John for a brief time when a magical wish brings John forward through time from 2003. Michael is eventually defeated when Jack banishes him, but Jack begins to damage his soul as he taps into his powers after a confrontation with Lucifer, which results in him killing Mary by accident. His attempt to bring Mary back to life only restores her body, and when Castiel goes to Heaven to retrieve her soul, he learns that she has been reunited with John Winchester in Heaven, prompting Castiel to let Mary stay dead so she can be with him.

According to series creator Eric Kripke, her relation to Azazel was supposed to be addressed in the third season, but was pushed back to the fourth season due to the 2007-08 writer's strike.

==== In The Winchesters ====
In "Pilot", on March 23, 1972, a young Mary meets John Winchester as he returns home from fighting in the Vietnam War. Mary later rescues John from a demon and reluctantly introduces him to the world of the supernatural. Mary's father Samuel has recently gone missing while on a hunting trip and has sent Mary to recover a schematic from an old Men of Letters clubhouse of a mysterious box. Teaming up with John and her friends Carlos Cervantez and Latika Desai, Mary pursues both her missing father and the box. Mary reveals to John that she is consumed with guilt over the recent death of her cousin Maggie and seeks to leave the hunting life as a result. Although the group is unable to find Samuel, they do succeed in locating the box which is able to trap and kill demons. Ada Monroe reveals that Samuel was seeking the box as it is the only thing that can kill the Akrida, a malevolent force not of this world that seeks to invade and destroy all manner of life. While the Men of Letters had stopped them in the past, they are gone now, leaving the Akrida free to invade. Mary decides to continue Samuel's work as well as to continue her search for her father with John, Carlos, Latika and Ada joining her.

=== Rufus Turner ===
Rufus Turner, portrayed by Steven Williams, is a semi-retired hunter who helped Bobby Singer when his wife, Karen Singer, was possessed by a demon. Rufus exorcised the demon and helped cover up Karen's death. It is Rufus who introduced Bobby to the world of the supernatural, and they hunted together for many years until a hunt went wrong in Omaha, Nebraska, and someone important to Rufus died. They became estranged after this. Fifteen years later, Rufus responds to Bobby's request for information on Bela Talbot and helps Dean locate her in "Time Is On My Side." He returns to active hunting after Lucifer rises and the Apocalypse begins.

Rufus is introduced in the third-season episode "Time Is on My Side" when Bobby, who has not heard from Rufus in about 15 years, receives a phone call in which Rufus alerts him to the whereabouts of Bela Talbot. Dean visits Rufus, even though Sam opposes the idea of hunting for Bela, as they have only a couple of weeks until Dean's deal runs out. Rufus presents Dean with a manila folder on Bela, which gives Dean new and interesting details from her past.

Rufus appears off-screen in "When the Levee Breaks", when he calls Bobby with news of more of the 66 Seals being broken.

In "Good God Y'All", Rufus heads to a town he thinks is under attack from demons, based on omens of a polluted river and a falling star. He calls Ellen, Jo, and Bobby for help. When Sam and Dean arrive, he and Jo have been separated from Ellen. Jo and Rufus capture Sam, thinking he is possessed. Later, Ellen and Dean help break the spell War has over them. Bobby talks on the phone to Rufus about omens that may indicate the appearance of Death, in "The Devil You Know".

In "Weekend at Bobby's", Rufus arrives at Singer Salvage Yard to dispose of the body of an apparently dead Okami. Bobby assists him and helps him evade capture by the FBI. However, the Okami is revealed to still be alive and is subsequently dispatched by Bobby. Afterward, Rufus uses his contacts to uncover information on Crowley's life as a human and later steals a signet ring from a museum which once belonged to Crowley's son as part of Bobby's attempt to regain his soul from the demon. Rufus investigates the same case as the Winchesters and Bobby, in "...And Then There Were None". The group later encounters Samuel and Gwen Campbell, and discover that the monster is a new breed created by Eve, the "Khan Worm." After Gwen and Samuel are killed, Rufus is stabbed by a possessed Bobby. As cremation is not undertaken in the Jewish tradition, Rufus is buried in a Jewish cemetery rather than given a Hunter's funeral pyre. Bobby pours some of Rufus' favorite drink—Johnnie Walker Blue Label—on the grave before taking a drink himself.

After becoming comatose from being shot in the head by Dick Roman, Bobby relives various memories of Sam, Dean, Karen, his family, and Rufus. Remembering Rufus has a traumatic effect on Bobby, and he reveals to Rufus that he is just a memory appearing in Bobby's comatose mind. While initially disbelieving, Rufus accompanies Bobby in a quest through the past in which Bobby confronts his worst memories to momentarily recover from his gunshot wound.

In "Safe House", flashbacks show a case Bobby and Rufus worked together during the fourth season where Rufus called Bobby for help on an apparent haunted house. However, the two eventually realized they were dealing with a being known as a Soul Eater rather than a ghost. Unable to kill the Soul Eater, Rufus painted a sigil that would trap it, but the Soul Eater pulled Bobby's soul out of his body and into its "nest" outside of time and space, using Bobby to attack Rufus. Rufus subdued the possessed Bobby and finished the sigil, trapping the Soul Eater in its nest. He later leaves Bobby the bottle of Johnny Walker Blue found by Sam and Jody Mills in "Time After Time" since Bobby was right about what they were dealing with and brushes off Bobby's concerns about how he escaped the nest.

=== Samuel Campbell ===
Samuel Campbell, portrayed by Mitch Pileggi and Tom Welling, is the maternal grandfather of Sam and Dean Winchester, and Sam Winchester's namesake.

==== In Supernatural ====
He and his wife Deanna are revealed to be hunters in the fourth-season episode "In the Beginning", where Dean is transported back in time. Dean discovers that Samuel is being possessed by Azazel, and Samuel dies when Azazel leaves his body.

Samuel returns as a recurring character in the sixth season, where in the premiere, it is revealed that Samuel was brought down from Heaven at the same time Sam was resurrected from Hell. While he claims to have no idea why he was brought back, he, Sam and the other surviving members of the Campbell family are shown to be capturing dangerous supernatural creatures behind Dean's back, instead of killing them.

Samuel, who knows the cure to vampirism, returns during a string of vampire attacks in Limestone, Illinois, after Dean has been turned into a vampire. Knowing that Sam knew about the cure, as well, he concludes that Sam wanted Dean inside the nest to locate the Alpha Vampire, though Sam denies it.

It is later revealed that Samuel was resurrected by Crowley, and working with him in an attempt to find the location of Purgatory—the afterlife for monsters—in exchange for his daughter's resurrection. After Samuel betrayed the Winchesters when they attempted to kill Crowley, claiming that Mary was the only family that mattered to him, Dean vows to kill his grandfather the next time they meet.

A case he worked during his year spent hunting with Sam is seen in the episode, "Unforgiven", during which Samuel was shown to be disturbed at soulless-Sam's actions, using one of their current allies as bait to trap a monster.

In "...And Then There Were None", Samuel and Gwen encounter Sam, Dean, Rufus, and Bobby as they all investigate the same case. Sam prevents Dean from killing Samuel, feeling that he may be of some use yet. Samuel learns that Sam has regained his soul and has no memory of their time together. Gwen reveals that she was unaware of Samuel's betrayal but is killed by Dean, who is possessed by the Khan worm. Samuel is unapologetic when confronted by the brothers, though he did seem remorseful on it. It is subsequently revealed that he was possessed by the Khan worm and is shot dead by Sam. However, the Khan worm is not killed and uses his body to attack the group, but is driven out of Samuel when Bobby throws him against a live wire, electrocuting him and revealing the Khan worm's weakness.

In "Stuck In the Middle (With You)", a resurrected Mary reveals to Arthur Ketch that Samuel had used to tell her stories about the Colt. Unlike the legend that John Winchester knew about the gun, Samuel's version had the correct information that there were only five things that it couldn't kill rather than it being able to kill anything.

In "Hey, That's No Way To Say Goodbye," Dean and Bobby find it weird to see the Samuel from the Monster Club's world with a full head of hair, referencing their encounters with this version of Samuel.

==== In The Winchesters ====
In "Pilot", in March 1972, Samuel vanishes after opening a secret tomb hidden in a New Orleans cemetery. Before he disappears, Samuel directs Mary to retrieve a schematic from a mysterious box from a Men of Letters clubhouse, but he keeps the true purpose of his actions a secret, alarming her as this is something that Samuel never does. Mary teams up with John Winchester, Carlos Cervantez and Latika Dar to find her missing father and the box. The group uncovers that it is a weapon created by the Men of Letters that can trap and destroy monsters and locate it in the secret tomb that Samuel had opened. However, there is no sign of Samuel himself. Ada Monroe, who had been helping Samuel to search through various Men of Letters properties, reveals that Samuel had learned of the existence of the Akrida, monsters not of this world who want to invade, destroy all manner of life on Earth and take over the world for themselves. With the Men of Letters gone and no longer able to stop them, Samuel has been attempting to stop the Akrida by finding where they cross over into this world and using the box - the only thing that can kill them - to stop them. Mary and her friends decide to both continue the search for Samuel and to finish what he started. In the following episode, they find a number of dead zombies and a spent shell casing with Samuel's initials on it, but both Samuel and the information on the Akrida gone and a lead on a new case for them to follow.

In "Reflections," Samuel has been captured by the Akrida leader that is possessing Rockin' Roxy who offers to trade Samuel for the box, in reality something called the Ostium that can banish the Akrida back to their own world. They agree to make the trade, but use the Ostium to banish the Akrida leader instead after figuring out how to power it up again with the help of the ghost of Henry Winchester. However, this fails to kill all of the Akrida as expected as she was not the Akrida Queen. As several Akrida corner John and Mary, an injured Samuel appears to save them by using the Ostium to banish their attackers before collapsing from his injuries.

In "Hang On to Your Life," an injured Samuel is treated by Millie and explains that he'd found out about the Ostium and the Akrida while looking for a way to get rid of all monsters forever, feeling guilty for pushing his daughter into the hunting life. Samuel joins the Monster Club in fighting Loki and provides them with reconnaissance photos of several potential locations for the queen, although the pictures prove to have been light damaged. After Loki's defeat, Samuel leaves with Ada to search for magic capable of stopping the Akrida while leaving the broken Ostium in Millie's hands so that she can try to repair it, but Samuel promises to keep in touch this time. Amongst Samuel's pictures, John finds the man who gave him Henry's letter in the background of one, revealing him to be Dean Winchester, John's son and Samuel's grandson.

In "Hey, That's No Way To Say Goodbye," Samuel returns after receiving the news that Ada has found magic capable of stopping the Akrida Queen who intends to use a planetary alignment to open her portal and begin the invasion. Samuel is contacted by a former hunter named Joan Hopkins who turns out to be the Akrida Queen, having been driven insane, consumed monster essences and seeks to wipe out humanity as a result. While the others try to summon Dean back from where Joan has banished him to, John, Carlos and Samuel hold off Joan and several Akrida to buy them time, before Mary finally kills Joan by hitting her with the Impala which is capable of hurting her as the car is from another universe. The Akrida are destroyed with Joan's death and Dean explains to Samuel and the gathered hunters that they were a failsafe plan of Chuck's in the event of his defeat which Dean had discovered while traversing the Multiverse following his death. Dean reveals that John, Mary and Samuel are from an alternate universe that he'd come across during his travels while trying to find a world where his family got a chance at a happy ending. After Dean's departure back to Heaven, Samuel says goodbye to Mary and leaves, presumably on another hunting trip, while Mary leaves Lawrence with John to figure out what they want to do with their futures.

=== Samuel Colt ===
Based on the historical gun maker of the same name, Samuel Colt is a hunter who lived in the 19th century and the creator of the Colt—a gun that can kill almost any supernatural being; Lucifer revealed that he is one of five supernatural beings immune to its powers. Colt also designed the locked door that keeps the portal to Hell known as the Devil's Gate from opening. The Devil's Gate and the Colt gun are linked together—the gun serves as the key to the gate, allowing it to be opened by inserting the Colt's muzzle into the key hole. Colt also built a railroad of iron, in the shape of a pentagram with a church at each of the points, around the devil's gate to further ensure that it was demon-proof. Colt was portrayed by Sam Hennings in the season six episode "Frontierland". Sam and Dean, when looking for a method of destroying Eve, come across Colt's journal which reveals that the hunter had killed a phoenix in 1861. As the ashes of a phoenix are needed to kill Eve, Castiel sends Sam and Dean back in time to retrieve them. Although Samuel is initially reluctant to assist Sam, he eventually gives him the Colt which Dean kills the phoenix with. When Sam and Dean are pulled back to the present day without the ashes, it is revealed that Colt sent a courier package 150 years ago containing the ashes, which arrives at Bobby's door. He was able to figure out how to use Sam's cell phone, which he left behind (and which Colt sent back to him), and learned the date and Bobby's address from it.

=== Walt and Roy ===
Walt and Roy are two hunters first appearing in season 5's "Dark Side of the Moon." Having learned of Sam's role in starting the Apocalypse, the two hunters ambush the Winchesters in a motel room with the intention of killing Sam whom they see as a monster. After Dean recognizes both men, they decided to kill both Winchesters rather than risk Dean's wrath. Dean promises that when he inevitably returns, he will hunt them down and kill them for revenge. The Winchesters are sent to Heaven after the murder and are eventually resurrected by the angel Joshua on the orders of God.

Both Walt and Roy return in season 12's "Who We Are" as two of the hunters called in to help deal with the British Men of Letters situation by Jody Mills. Having not seen the Winchesters since murdering them in "Dark Side of the Moon", the reunion is somewhat awkward, but Dean assures both men that there are no lasting hard feelings over their actions. Walt and Roy join Sam's assault on the British Men of Letters base with Roy even saving Sam's life from a British operative that Sam misses. Roy is killed during the assault by another operative that Sam shoots moments later, but Walt survives. Walt, who acts as the team's explosives expert, joins Sam and Jody in confronting Doctor Hess and follows Sam's lead during the confrontation.

Walt is mentioned again in season 13's "Wayward Sisters" as one of the hunters contacted by Alex Jones when the Winchesters disappear. Like the other hunters, Walt has seen no sign of them but promises to keep looking.

== Other humans ==
=== Adam Milligan ===
Adam Milligan, portrayed by Jake Abel is the illegitimate son of John Winchester and the half-brother of Sam and Dean Winchester. He was born from a relationship between John and a woman named Kate Milligan, while John was on a hunt. At age 12, he begged his mother to call his father and from then on they would have sporadic contact, but John never told Adam of his other sons, who had no idea about Adam's existence. Despite John's attempts at parenting, Adam never saw John as his father and viewed his mother as his only family, but still wished to have a closer relationship with his father.

His existence is revealed to Sam and Dean in Jump the Shark, in which he was murdered by ghouls along with his mother, as the ghouls wanted revenge on John for the murder of their father. One of the ghouls took on Adam's identity to lure John to them. However, as John was already dead, his other sons got the call and were shocked to learn of their half-brother. During their investigation, Adam's body was discovered by Dean, just as Sam was attacked by the ghouls, who settled for killing Sam and Dean. Dean killed the ghouls, avenging Adam's death and they subsequently gave a hunter's funeral for the brother they never knew.

In season 5's "Point of No Return", Adam is resurrected by Zachariah to serve as Michael's vessel after Dean's continuing refusal to say yes. However, Castiel senses Adam's resurrection and is able to get to him before the angels do and the Winchesters, Castiel and Bobby continually try to talk Adam out of his plan without any luck as Zachariah has promised to bring back his mother in exchange for Adam's help. Zachariah eventually appears to Adam in the form of a dream and convinces him to reveal where the Winchesters are keeping him. Zachariah takes Adam to the Green Room where he reveals that Adam's resurrection was actually a trap to get Dean to say yes, using Dean's weakness for his family against him. The Winchesters storm the Green Room to Adam's surprise and Zachariah tortures both Sam and Adam to finally get a yes out of Dean. However, at the last minute, Dean changes his mind and kills Zachariah with an angel blade. As the three humans try to flee, the descending Michael traps Adam in the Green Room with himself and Zachariah's body and the room disappears when the Winchesters try to get back inside. Both Sam and Dean acknowledge that neither Adam nor Castiel are likely alright and vow to get them back.

In "Two Minutes to Midnight", Castiel reveals to Sam that Adam has now become Michael's vessel for the rapidly approaching final battle which Sam admits is a possibility that they didn't really want to consider.

In "Swan Song", Adam is Michael's vessel when he meets with Lucifer in Stull Cemetery for the final battle of the Apocalypse. When Dean arrives, he tries to apologize to Adam, but the archangel tells him that "Adam isn't home right now." After retaking control from Lucifer, Sam throws himself, Lucifer, Michael and Adam into Lucifer's Cage to stop the Apocalypse.

In season 6's "Appointment in Samarra", Dean is offered the choice of saving Adam or Sam from Hell by Death and he chooses Sam though he does ask Death to save Adam too without success.

In season 10's "Fan Fiction", the Winchesters are confused when, during a play based on the Supernatural books, a character they don't recognize comes on stage. Maeve tells them that it is Adam who is still stuck in Hell with Lucifer. Sam and Dean's reactions suggest that they have forgotten about Adam.

In season 15's "Our Father, Who Aren't In Heaven", Adam, still Michael's vessel, has escaped from Hell after God threw every door in Hell open, including the door to Lucifer's Cage. Now sharing control of his body with the archangel, Adam enjoys eating a variety of food for the first time in ten years and discusses with Michael, appearing as a duplicate of Adam himself, what they will both do now. The two have bonded during their time in the cage and Adam indirectly suggests that they stay together, which Michael does not seem opposed to. Adam's meal is interrupted by the arrival of Lilith seeking Michael on God's orders, ending with Michael killing the demon. Michael later returns control to Adam after he is captured by the Winchesters and Adam explains that he and Michael reached an agreement during their years in the Cage when they only had each other for company. To Michael's surprise, Adam sides with his brothers on the matter, pointing out that while he doesn't forgive them, he knows Sam and Dean always try to do the right thing. Adam eventually gets Michael to admit that he refuses to doubt God as he feels that is a betrayal of who he is. Michael isn't convinced to help until Castiel shows Michael his own memories of God's betrayals. As Michael prepares to leave, he returns control to Adam at Dean's request. Dean apologizes to his brother for what happened to him, stating that Adam is a good man and didn't deserve what happened to him. Adam quips "since when do we get what we deserve?" and wishes them luck before departing with Michael.

In "Inherit the Earth", Michael sadly reveals that Adam was killed along with the rest of humanity by Chuck, although the archangel continues to use Adam's body as his vessel. Chuck subsequently obliterates Michael for his betrayal, taking with him Adam's body. However, Jack restores everyone Chuck killed, meaning that Adam is restored as well.

=== Arthur Ketch ===
Arthur Ketch, portrayed by David Haydn-Jones, is a former British Man of Letters. Ketch is first mentioned while Lady Toni Bevell is torturing Sam for information. When all their methods prove fruitless, Ms. Watt suggests bringing in Ketch; however, Toni is vehemently against it. He's also shown in a flashback killing a vampire, identifiable by the tattoo on his hand. Later on, Mick Davies retrieves Toni and informs her that he has sent for Ketch, who is shown preparing to leave the UK. This leaves Toni visibly uncomfortable.

In "Season 12, American Nightmare", Ketch drives up to the Impala on a motorcycle and stares at it or a moment before driving away. He later tracks down and kills Magda Peterson, telling someone on the phone that he cleaned up the Winchesters mess and they were right about the Winchesters being unable to kill her.

In "LOTUS", Ketch rescues the Winchesters and Castiel from the Secret Service and orders Castiel to wipe their memory before introducing himself. That night, Arthur explains that his job is to "strongly encourage" the Winchesters cooperation with the British Men of Letters and was sent by Mick Davies after Sam called him and hung up. Ketch has Castiel confirm that he's not lying and shows them his arsenal of weapons, including a hyperbolic pulse generator capable of exorcising a demon from its vessel. Recognizing its potential, Sam asks to borrow it and for Ketch to trust them. Ketch eventually gives the Winchesters the generator, enabling them to force Lucifer from President Jefferson Rooney and send Lucifer back to his Cage.

Six weeks later, Castiel contacts Arthur Ketch and Mick to help him and Mary find Sam and Dean who have been taken prisoner by the Secret Service. The two men are impressed to learn that the brothers had in fact borrowed Arthur's gadget to deal with Lucifer himself. They agree to help in hopes that it will earn them the trust of the American hunters, and through their connections, Arthur and Mick locate Sam and Dean near Site 94.

Once the four encounter Sam and Dean, Arthur is unimpressed to learn that they left survivors. Sam insists the people pursuing them were just soldiers doing their job, though Arthur considers it "unprofessional". Sam, Dean and Castiel head to Mary's car while glaring at Arthur suspiciously. Arthur and Mick watch them drive off and share a knowing look at each other. It is later revealed that Arthur went back and killed all those involved in Sam and Dean's imprisonment, including Agent Rick, Agent Camp, the soldiers and the coroner. Mick reports this while noting that cleaning up loose ends is Arthur's job.

In "Stuck in the Middle (With You)", Mary visits Arthur after stealing the Colt and tells him the story of its theft from Ramiel. Mary is enraged that Arthur sent her after a Prince of Hell which got Wally killed and threatens to destroy the British Men of Letters if something happens to her sons. Arthur apologizes, claiming not to have known that she was going after a Prince of Hell. Arthur and Mary discuss the legend of the Colt as an excited Arthur unwraps it.

In "The Raid", Mary and Arthur take out a vampire nest together and Arthur expresses his dislike for them trying to recruit the Winchester brothers when they have Mary. Arthur later visits Dean at the Men of Letters bunker and sits down for a drink with him. Rather than trying the sales pitch of the other British Men of Letters, Arthur is frank with Dean about his motives, telling Dean that he is a killer and the British Men of Letters offer him the best chance to express his talents. Arthur sees Dean as the same as him and the two decide to take down a vampire nest together. At the nest, Arthur initially arms himself with a gun, but decides to use a machete instead like Dean. The two men find only one vampire hiding in the nest and Arthur beats upon her before Dean stops him to try things his way. When Dean promises to grant the vampire a quick end, she tells them that her nest is going after the British Men of Letters.

Alarmed, Dean and Arthur rush back to the British Men of Letters compound to find that Sam has killed the Alpha Vampire and the surviving vampires have fled. Mick berates Arthur who tells him he was trying to recruit Dean and would have succeeded if Mick's operation hadn't screwed things up. He then takes the rogue hunter Pierce Moncrieff for punishment.

In season 13, a resurrected Arthur returns as a mercenary hunter separated from the British Men of Letters who are unaware of his survival. In "War of the Worlds", he is going by the alias of Alexander Ketch, pretending to be Arthur's twin brother. However, Dean sees through the disguise and Arthur explains that he had made a deal with Rowena for a resurrection spell that he needs recharged which brought him back after Mary killed him. Arthur saves the Winchesters from a group of demons and insists that he is on their side and that his previous actions only came from being a soldier on the opposite side of a war from them. When Dean tries to kill Arthur again, he flees and is later seen being employed by the Prince of Hell Asmodeus who is preparing to procure Jack for the Alternate Michael's invasion.

In "Devil's Bargain", Asmodeus supplies Arthur with an angel blade and sends him to kill the weakened Lucifer, believing Lucifer to be vulnerable to an angel blade in his current state. Arthur once again encounters the Winchesters who have Castiel knock him unconscious and lock him in the Impala's trunk, intending to kill him and scatter his ashes to make his death permanent. Arthur once more escapes confinement, just in time to use a demon bomb to drive Lucifer and Anael away, saving the Winchesters and Castiel. Stating that Lucifer being loose upon the Earth is a line too far for him, Arthur reveals his alliance with Asmodeus and offers to work with the Winchesters as a double agent to stop Lucifer, Asmodeus and the threat of an alternate reality Michael. Recognizing that they need him, the Winchesters reluctantly agree to the alliance. Upon Arthur's return to Asmodeus' lair, Asmodeus reveals that he has acquired the Archangel Blade, the one weapon that can kill an archangel such as Lucifer or Michael. After Arthur points out that the blade can only be used to kill an archangel by another archangel, Asmodeus introduces him to the captive archangel Gabriel who has been believed dead for nearly eight years.

In "The Thing", Arthur discovers that Asmodeus has been injecting himself with Gabriel's grace to power up. Arthur's continuing impertinence and defiance enrage Asmodeus who brutally beats him. Asmodeus states that Arthur is more wicked than any demon he knows "and I know 'em all", but recognizes that Arthur seeks redemption for his past actions which he doesn't think that Arthur can get. Once Asmodeus leaves him alone, Arthur gets back at him by rescuing Gabriel and steals Asmodeus' store of Gabriel's extracted grace as well as the Archangel Blade. Arthur brings all three to the Winchesters, seeking sanctuary from Asmodeus in return which Dean agrees to. After the Winchesters open a rift to Apocalypse World, Arthur decides to join Dean on the mission, feeling that he is safer in another universe when Asmodeus will inevitably come looking for him.

In "Bring 'Em Back Alive", Arthur teams up with a reluctant Dean to find and rescue Mary and Jack. The two witness several angels executing resistance fighters and taking captive Charlie Bradbury, the alternate counterpart of an old friend of Dean's. Against Arthur's wishes, Dean sets out to rescue Charlie, the two men being forced to work together to survive. Along the way, Dean tells Arthur of his inability to save Charlie and Arthur admits his own regrets that he never even tried to save the lives of those he cares about. Together, Dean and Arthur raid a POW camp, killing several angels and liberating Charlie and several other human prisoners. With the rift closing, Arthur chooses to remain behind in Apocalypse World with Charlie to continue the mission to find Mary and Jack and to help coordinate for Dean's inevitable return with reinforcements. As angels attack the rift, Arthur engages in battle with them alongside Charlie.

In "Exodus", Arthur has become a full-fledged member of the Apocalypse World resistance and joins Charlie on a mission to ambush an angel death squad. However, it turns out to be a trap and both are captured. Arthur undergoes extensive torture for information on the resistance, but refuses to break, even taunting his captors. The angels call in an alternate reality Castiel to tear the information from Charlie's mind, but Sam, Dean, Mary, Jack and Castiel arrive to rescue them, killing all of the angels, including the alternate Castiel. As Dean helps him, Arthur comments on the irony of Dean saving his life for once. Arthur joins the later exodus through the rift and is one of the first through. In the bunker, he and Rowena express shock at the sight of each other before Arthur moves on. During the later party, Arthur enjoys a drink with Charlie. He is mentioned to be off doing his own thing in "Let the Good Times Roll".

In season 14's "Stranger in a Strange Land", Arthur is mentioned to be following up on a lead in London in the search for a way to save Dean from Michael's possession. Sam later gets a call from Arthur and tells Castiel that Arthur has been searching for the hyperbolic pulse generator, the device they used to exorcise Lucifer out of the President in the hopes that it can be used to eject Michael from Dean. However, Arthur has had no luck in his search. In "The Spear", Arthur has found the hyperbolic pulse generator, but is forced to mail it to the Winchesters who are less than pleased as they need it immediately. Somewhat stunned, Arthur apologizes for his inability to deliver it to them directly. Though the Winchesters find the package, the device is destroyed by Michael before they can use it. In "Jack in the Box", Arthur is unable to attend Mary's hunter's memorial. Instead, he sends a bottle of the same expensive scotch he'd brought Dean in "The Raid."

In season 15's "Raising Hell", Arthur arrives in Harlan, Kansas after God releases all of the souls in Hell upon the world. After meeting the demon Belphegor, Arthur reveals that he was hired to assassinate Belphegor by the demon Ardat who claims that Belphegor is "a monstrous threat to humanity". As this doesn't seem to be the case, Arthur refrains from harming the demon and assists the Winchesters and Rowena in finding a way to contain the souls, developing a mutual attraction with Rowena in the process. Arthur is later possessed by the ghost of Francis Tumblety, forcing Dean to shoot him with iron bullets to expel Francis. With Castiel unable to heal Arthur, he is taken to the hospital for treatment and takes Dean shooting him good-naturedly.

In "The Rupture", after awakening in the hospital, Arthur prepares to leave to help his friends, only to have Ardat arrive. Unable to defeat the demon, Arthur refuses to give up his friends for any price, something that Ardat recognizes. Ardat rips out Arthur's heart and after showing it to him for a minute, crushes Arthur's heart, killing him. Ardat later poses as Arthur using his phone to trick Dean into revealing where the Winchesters are and what they are up to. His death is subsequently avenged when Belphegor kills Ardat, but not before she reveals to Castiel that Belphegor truly is the threat she'd claimed to Arthur when she hired him to kill Belphegor. At the end of the episode, Dean reveals to Sam that the other hunters found Arthur and that he was probably killed by a demon. Having just lost Rowena as well, both Sam and Dean are devastated by the news.

=== Ash ===
Ash, portrayed by Chad Lindberg, is a mullet-wearing computer expert, who works and lives at Harvelle's Roadhouse with Jo and Ellen Harvelle. He attended MIT, but was kicked out for "fighting". He owns a homemade laptop, which he uses to track the paranormal, particularly Azazel, with the information John Winchester and his sons, Sam and Dean, have gathered. In the episode "All Hell Breaks Loose: Part 1", he calls Dean to tell him he has discovered something important, but by the time Dean arrives at the Roadhouse to talk, the Roadhouse has been burned to the ground, and Dean finds Ash's corpse in the rubble.

Series creator Eric Kripke stated that Ash's death "had to do with how much I hated the actual Roadhouse itself rather than anyone in it." As for the character's return, Kripke replied, "Ash is a possibility." This comes to fruition in the fifth-season episode "Dark Side of the Moon", in which Sam and Dean meet Ash in Heaven, as well as Pamela. Enjoying the afterlife more than his actual life, and having discovered means to infiltrate other people's Heavens and tap into the angel's communications, Ash helps the brothers hide from Zachariah. Ash also revealed to them that they have died more times than they know and he has helped them before, with the angels erasing their memories upon resurrection.

=== Becky Rosen ===
Becky Rosen, portrayed by Emily Perkins, is a fan of the "Supernatural" series of books. Her online name is samlicker81, and she is the webmistress of morethanbrothers.net. She writes Wincest fanfiction. Carver Edlund aka Chuck Shurley contacts her to get a message to Sam and Dean in "Sympathy for the Devil". She initially believed it to be a joke but Chuck told her that his stories were real and she was excited as she thought so. It is obvious from her reaction to the boys that she is a Sam Girl, and fixates upon him much to his dismay.

Becky Rosen "borrows" Chuck Shurley's phone, pretending to be him, and texts Sam & Dean saying he's in a life or death situation in "The Real Ghostbusters". Sam and Dean rush over after driving all night only to find out that Becky has invited them to a Supernatural Convention for Chuck's books. When real ghosts start attacking people, Chuck has to step up and help keep everyone safe while Sam and Dean and two Supernatural fanboys, Demian and Barnes, fight the ghosts. His bravery impresses Becky who immediately abandons her pursuit of Sam for a relationship with Chuck. She also tells Sam that in the book which covers the events of "Time Is on My Side", Bela gave the Colt not to Lilith but to her right hand demon, and possibly lover, Crowley.

In "Season 7, Time for a Wedding!" a Crossroads Demon named Guy gives her a love potion to make Sam marry her, she believed Guy was a Wiccan until the demon betrays her and shows her his eyes. Guy asks for her soul in exchange for making the effect permanent, he wanted to make a deal after seeing she was married to the skilled hunter even agreeing with her about Sam easily killing. Sam warned her not to go through with the deal. According to her, Chuck broke up with her, which is presumably her reason for fixating on Sam again. During the battle at the end, she helps trap the demon, but his minion breaks him free. As the demon and his minion Jackson are about to kill the hunters, Becky retrieves Ruby's Knife and kills Jackson with it, allowing the Winchesters to overpower the Crossroads Demon whose deals are revoked by Crowley who is bemused when she excitedly recognizes him. Later, she and Sam get an annulment.

In "Slumber Party", it is revealed by Charlie that Becky posted all of Chuck's unpublished manuscripts to the Internet, with the result that the public is now 'aware' of events in Sam and Dean's lives up to the confrontation between Lucifer/Sam and Michael/Adam. When asked if they know her, Sam quickly denies it.

In "Atomic Monsters", Chuck visits Becky for help though she is less than pleased to see him. Though still a fan of Supernatural, Becky is not quite so obsessed anymore and has married and had children. Becky agrees to edit Chuck's newest story and provides critique that essentially acts as meta references for both the episode and the show itself. Becky's words causes Chuck to write a much darker ending, much to Becky's horror. When her family comes home, Chuck causes them to vanish with just a snap of his fingers, though Chuck claims that he has simply sent them "away". Revealing his true identity as God himself to Becky, Chuck causes her to vanish into thin air also with a snap of his fingers.

=== Ben Braeden ===
Ben Braeden is the son of Lisa Braeden, a woman Dean once spent a weekend with in August 1999, portrayed by Nicholas Elia. Lisa and Ben live in Cicero, Indiana. Though Dean suspects he is Ben's biological father, Lisa claims that this is not so.

Dean drops in to visit Lisa in "The Kids Are Alright", while investigating a case, on what happens to be Ben's 8th birthday. Dean meets Ben and is struck by his familiar rock-music loving, girl ogling ways, but Lisa assures Dean that he is not Ben's father. Later Dean helps Ben out in an encounter with some bullies. Although his advice, to "kick the kid in the nuts", does not get Lisa's approval, Ben hugs Dean in thanks. Later Ben is one of the children taken by a mother Changeling, and one of her offspring imitates Ben and starts feeding on Lisa. Dean and Sam rescue all the children and kill the head Changeling, destroying the imitation Ben. Dean is impressed by Ben's cool headed behavior during the rescue, having put Ben in charge of helping the other children out a window.

When Dean returns to Lisa after the showdown in Stull Cemetery, in "Swan Song", Ben is seen at the dinner table.

Dean lives with Lisa and Ben for a year, but after an attack he insists they move and is conflicted by his desire to remain with his new family, his desire to hunt and the fear that he is raising Ben as his father raised him. Eventually, Lisa lets him go in "Two and a Half Men". Dean talks to Ben on the phone in "The Third Man". After believing he is about to die after having been turned into a vampire in "Live Free or Twi-Hard", Dean returns to say goodbye. However, he struggles to control his vampiric urges and shoves Ben and flees. Ben tricks Dean into returning once more in "Mannequin 3: The Reckoning"; however, he fails to reconcile with Lisa and Dean explains to Ben that he fears that if he stayed around, Ben would end up like him. Ben is still upset and accuses Dean of abandoning his family. Ben and Lisa are kidnapped by the demon Crowley, in "Let It Bleed", in an attempt to force Dean to stand down. After they are rescued, Dean asks Castiel to wipe Ben and his mother's memories of him, which he does.

=== Cole Trenton ===
Cole Trenton, portrayed by Travis Aaron Wade, is a military brat and an ex-Marine whose father, Edward, was killed by Dean Winchester in 2003, making him bent for revenge against his father's killer all his life. During his time in the military, he took part in the campaigns in Iraq, Darfur, and DR Congo and established many connections, including his longtime friend Kit Verson and a member of the Military Intelligence. Though Cole is not a hunter and leads an ordinary life with a wife and a son, he is an expert at martial arts and is fit due to his time as a soldier, and he also keeps a rifle that is associated with hunters. He tracks Dean upon the latter's sighted attack at a store captured by a surveillance camera and beats Sam, attempting to use him as a hostage. When Sam escapes, Cole follows him as the latter is about to meet Dean at a bar. However, though he finally confronts his father's killer, Dean easily defeats him with his demonic powers, but spares him as he wants Cole to live in humiliation for failing to avenge his father. Cole does not give up, however, and he begins studying about demons and starts to torture demons in hopes of tracking Dean once more. Cole holds Dean at gunpoint when the latter is cornering Rowena, forcing Dean to let her go, and sprays holy water against him, but as Dean is no longer a demon at that point, it does not work. He is defeated once again, but Dean offers to explain his motive of why he killed Edward: Edward was a monster who had killed many people and eaten their livers, and he would have killed Cole and his mother had Dean not killed him earlier. Convinced by Dean and Sam, Cole decides to drop his revenge and return to his family.

Later, Cole with Dean and Sam work together to help his friend, Kit, after the latter's wife, Jemma, reported his weird actions. Upon finding out that Kit is possessed by a Khan Worm, Cole is concerned that the Winchesters would try to kill him like they did with countless others, including his father. Cole is possessed by a Khan Worm, but Dean manages to save him by dehydrating the room and causing the monster to flee. However, the three are too late to stop Kit from succumbing to the parasite even further, and Sam has to kill him because of it. Cole thanks the brothers for saving him, but hopes that he will never see them again.

=== Ed Zeddmore and Harry Spangler ===
Ed Zeddmore and Harry Spangler, portrayed by A.J. Buckley and Travis Wester, are self-proclaimed professional paranormal investigators. They are introduced in the episode "Hell House" written by Trey Callaway as the Hell Hounds, operating a website called HellHoundsLair.com. They perceive Sam and Dean as amateurs, although the latter use the duo and their website to help them defeat the monster of the week. At the end of the episode Sam pulls a prank on them by posing as a Hollywood producer on the phone. In the episode "Ghostfacers", they produce a television pilot, which covers their investigation of a house that is haunted every leap day, where Sam and Dean make a guest appearance; however, Sam and Dean manage to magnetically wipe their footage. The episode was nominated for a GLAAD award for its portrayal of Ghostfacers intern Alan Corbett. In "It's a Terrible Life", where the Winchesters are placed in an alternative life as office workers, Zeddmore and Spangler appear on the Ghostfacers website where they present instructional videos on how to find and to defeat ghosts, and refer to the Winchesters as rival "douchebags that we hate". Ed, Harry and the rest of the team also star in the Ghostfacers web series, a spoof advertisement which is seen in "Hammer of the Gods". They were also used as plot devices, in the season nine episode "Thinman" Ed and Harry face a conflict similar to one Sam and Dean face, creating a parallel between the characters, at the end of that episode we see an end to the Ghostfacers after Ed invents the monster Thinman to keep Harry from leaving for a normal life. Their names are homage to Winston Zeddemore and Egon Spengler, members of the Ghostbusters from the 1984 film.

=== Frank Devereaux ===
Frank Devereaux, portrayed by Kevin McNally, is an expert in counterfeit documents and in avoiding government intelligence. He was first introduced in the sixth episode of the seventh season, "Slash Fiction". It is revealed in the eleventh episode, "Adventures In Babysitting", that when he was 26, his wife and two children were killed. Sometime after that, he met Bobby Singer, who once saved his life in Port Huron. Frank lives in a run-down, electronics filled house on a little traveled street. He describes himself as 'bi-polar with delusional ideation'.

Bobby sends the Winchesters to see Frank when two Leviathans begin a series of killings throughout the country, masquerading as the brothers. When Sam and Dean enter Frank's house, he is waiting in the dark with a shotgun. He is prepared to shoot them, but because he owes Bobby he agrees to help them. At first, Frank believes that Leviathan Sam and Leviathan Dean are clones created by the government. Frank advises the boys to go into hiding, maybe even move to Cuba, but Dean says they need to go "further off the grid, but keep us on the board" so they can hunt down the Leviathans. He tells them that they need to keep a lower profile, avoid security cameras, and to get rid of their rockstar aliases, which are too easy to track. He smashes Sam's laptop, gives him a new one, and demands $5000 for it. He then takes their pictures for new IDs as Tom and John Smith and gives them a map of the towns their Leviathan doppelgängers have hit so far.

In "Adventures in Babysitting", Dean gives Frank the numbers "45489" which Bobby writes on Sam's hand before he dies, and also asks him to research Dick Roman. Having not heard from him over a month, Dean returns to Frank's house to find it deserted. Frank suddenly appears, confronts Dean, and they both have to shed some blood to prove to the other they are not a Leviathan. Frank states that he has moved all his equipment into an R.V., feeling he was being watched after he started investigating Dick Roman. Frank seems paranoid about Leviathans, even thinking that Gwyneth Paltrow is one of them. He tells Dean he has found nothing on Bobby's numbers, but when he tries combinations adding a sixth number, he discovers that they are coordinates to a field in Wisconsin, owned by Dick Roman. Frank and Dean travel to the area and disguise themselves as phone company workers. They discover surveillance covering the area and retreat to Frank's RV to monitor it. They discover Amanda Willer, an employee of Dick Roman, surveying the site for construction. As they began to spy the camp field, Frank challenges Dean about how he is dealing with himself on the whole situation, even telling Dean his dark past.

In the next episodes, Dean talks with Frank off-screen. In "Out with the Old", Frank talks with Dean by phone from his camper, updating Dean on the Leviathan activity worldwide. He has no record of their activity in Portland, Oregon, where Sam and Dean are currently working, but Leviathans are there all the same. Frank discovers this when Dean asks him to investigates a company behind an odd Realtor; and the company links back to Dick Roman. Sam and Dean set out to meet Frank at the end of the episode, but instead find his RV, filled with smashed electronics and blood. In "The Girl with the Dungeons and Dragons Tattoo", it is revealed that Dick Roman took Frank's hard drive, which he gives to the IT expert Charlie to hack. When Charlie tries to hack it, the defense system uses Frank's voice. After finally hacking it, an automatic email sent to the brothers which states that if they are receiving it, it means that Frank is dead or worse. Frank has a GPS tracker on the drive and it hacks into Charlie's webcam so they know who's hacking it. While Charlie is successful, she finds out the truth about Dick Roman and the Leviathans from his files and later teams up with the Winchesters to erase the drive. Frank's final fate is still unknown.

=== Jessica Moore ===
Jessica Lee Moore, portrayed by Adrianne Palicki, is Sam's girlfriend for two years as of the start of the series. Despite this, she is unaware of his family's strange occupation. Sam planned to ask her to marry him, but she is killed by a demon on Azazel's orders; it was revealed the demon that killed her was the friend who introduced her to Sam, named Brady, to break Sam from his increasingly normal life. Her death then prompts Sam to join Dean on his quest to find their missing father and avenge her. In the days preceding her murder, Sam had had premonitions of her murder in dreams, but he ignored them as random nightmares. Afterwards, he feels guilt for dismissing them so easily. Sam eventually kills the demon that killed her and gets revenge. In an alternate timeline created by the disappearance of John Winchester in 2003, Sam mentions that he has no time for a family, suggesting that things didn't work out with Jess in that world.

=== Kaia Nieves ===
Kaia Nieves, portrayed by Yadira Guevara-Prip, is a dreamwalker, a human with the ability to view alternate realities in their dreams. In Kaia's case, she is stated to be the most powerful dreamwalker her friend and mentor Derek Swan ever seen. Kaia has no control over this power and only sees a monster-filled world that she dubs The Bad Place. As is later revealed, this is because of a life-long connection to her alternate reality counterpart Dark Kaia who has in turn seen Kaia's world through their connection.

In season 13's "The Bad Place", Kaia is sought out for help by the Nephilim Jack on the suggestion of Derek Swan as Jack needs a dreamwalker to open a rift to the Apocalypse World alternate reality and rescue Mary Winchester. Jack breaks Kaia out of a drug treatment facility, but she refuses to help and runs off before being kidnapped by angels who are after Jack. Upon being rescued by the Winchesters, Kaia has to be forced at gunpoint to join them and explains that she won't help because of her fears of The Bad Place. After Jack shows Kaia Apocalypse World, she agrees to help. Cornered on an abandoned ship by angels, Kaia suggests opening the rift to escape. Combining his powers with Kaia's, Jack guides her into finding Apocalypse World instead of The Bad Place, but she begins flashing between the two worlds, ending with a vision of Dark Kaia. Jack and Kaia's efforts open a rift, destroying the attacking angels in the process, but sends the Winchesters to The Bad Place, Jack to Apocalypse World and an unconscious Kaia to a nearby roadside.

In "Wayward Sisters", Kaia is found by a passing motorist and transported to Sioux Falls General Hospital for treatment. Claire Novak, aware that the Winchesters were looking for Kaia, locates her in the hospital for help with finding her missing friends, but Kaia flees once again. However, she is attacked by a creature from The Bad Place outside and saved by Claire and Jody. Bonding with Claire over their experiences, Kaia reveals her knowledge of the creature and about the Winchesters' efforts to open a rift. The group realizes that the rift must still be open for the creature to be in their world and with Kaia's help, locates the abandoned ship where more of the creatures reside. With the rift closing, Claire chooses to crossover to The Bad Place to rescue Sam and Dean while the others stay behind to fight off the creatures. Despite her fears, Kaia crosses the rift with Claire and the two rescue Sam and Dean. As they lead the Winchesters to safety, the four are ambushed by Dark Kaia who throws her spear at Claire. Kaia saves Claire's life, but is hit with the spear in the process and apparently dies moments later. With the rift closing and a giant creature closing in on them, the Winchesters and Claire are forced to flee to their world, leaving Kaia's body behind in The Bad Place. Grief-stricken, Claire vows revenge upon Kaia's killer even if she has to find a way back to The Bad Place, unaware that Dark Kaia opened a rift of her own and crossed to their world.

In season 14's "The Scar", the Winchesters and Jody Mills hunt Kaia's killer in their world and are shocked to learn that she is Kaia's alternate counterpart. Dark Kaia admits that Kaia's death was an accident as she was aiming for Claire and displays knowledge of Kaia's interactions with the Winchesters, Dean in particular, from having seen through Kaia's eyes due to their connection. After Dark Kaia escapes again, Jody is left worried about how to explain the situation to Claire who was in love with Kaia and still seeks revenge upon her killer.

In season 15's "Galaxy Brain", Dark Kaia reveals that The Bad Place is dying and that Kaia is in fact still alive and trapped there. In a flashback, Dark Kaia is depicted treating Kaia's wound which had apparently caused her to pass out rather than die as was originally believed, before Dark Kaia abandoned her to cross to their world. With Dark Kaia having left Kaia the tools that she needed, Kaia survived two years stuck in The Bad Place, but Dark Kaia learned that her world is in trouble from the connection that still existed between the two. With the help of Jack and a Reaper named Merle, the Winchesters open another rift to The Bad Place and locate Kaia who has been living in Dark Kaia's old home. As The Bad Place is destroyed, Dark Kaia chooses to remain and die with her world as the Winchesters and Kaia escape through the rift. Reunited with Jody, Kaia accepts an invitation to return to Sioux Falls with her and is pleased to learn that Claire, out seeking Dark Kaia at the time, will be home soon.

==== Dark Kaia ====
Dark Kaia, also portrayed by Yadira Guevara-Prip, is the alternate reality counterpart of Kaia from The Bad Place. A dreamwalker like Kaia, Dark Kaia has shared a connection with Kaia for her whole life that has allowed them to see through each other's eyes, though Dark Kaia seems to be more aware of the nature of their connection than Kaia. Due to living in a monster-filled world, Dark Kaia is a tougher more ruthless individual who is implied to have fed others to a giant monster. She also possesses a powerful spear of unknown origin that can hurt and possibly kill an archangel.

In season 13's "The Bad Place", Dark Kaia is briefly seen as a dark hooded figure when Kaia and Jack attempt to open a rift to Apocalypse World to rescue Mary Winchester. Kaia's dreamwalking visions flash between the two alternate worlds before settling on an image of Dark Kaia that appears to be staring right at Kaia. The disruption causes Jack to be sent to Apocalypse World, the Winchesters to The Bad Place and Kaia to a roadside in her world.

In "Wayward Sisters", the Winchesters are stalked and captured by Dark Kaia who refuses to respond to their questions and attempts to feed them to the giant monster. However, Kaia and Claire Novak arrive through the rift and rescue the Winchesters. As they attempt to leave, Dark Kaia tries to kill Claire with her spear, but Kaia shoves Claire out of the way and takes the hit herself, apparently dying in the process. As the Winchesters and Claire turn on Dark Kaia, the giant creature appears which, combined with the closing rift, forces them to flee back to their world. Claire subsequently vows revenge upon Dark Kaia even if she has to find a way back to The Bad Place to get it. Unknown to Claire, another rift opens that night from which Dark Kaia emerges.

In season 14's "The Scar", the Winchesters and Jody hunt down Dark Kaia where she been living in the woods near Sioux Falls after Dean remembers that it was Dark Kaia who injured the alternate reality Michael while he was still possessing Dean. Having killed some of Michael's enhanced vampires that were hunting her, Dark Kaia is captured by the group who are shocked by her resemblance to their fallen friend. Dark Kaia refuses to cooperate, but their confrontation causes Dean to remember Michael attempting to forge an alliance with Dark Kaia that she rejected and fought back as a result of. With more enhanced vampires attacking, Dean frees Dark Kaia who flees. However, she returns with her spear and saves the Winchesters and Jody. Dark Kaia claims that she did it to help herself, not them and decides to hang onto the spear despite the fact that Michael's monsters will continue hunting her for it. The Winchesters subsequently hunt for Dark Kaia and her spear which is the only known weapon that can harm Michael.

In "The Spear", Garth, having infiltrated Michael's organization, overhears Dark Kaia's location and passes it onto the Winchesters. Dean and Castiel track her down and Dean convinces her to lend him the spear. In return, Dark Kaia requests that Jack help her return home where she has somebody that she wants to protect, the magic that allowed her to open the rift on that side not working in their world. Dean accepts, promising to find Dark Kaia when they are done. However, Michael destroys the spear after repossessing Dean.

In season 15's "Galaxy Brain", Dark Kaia kills a cow to draw Jody out and kidnaps her to force Sam and Dean back to Sioux Falls. Dark Kaia demands the return of her spear and that they keep their promise to send her home, but they inform her that the spear has been destroyed and overpower Dark Kaia. Dark Kaia insists on returning home and reveals that The Bad Place is dying and she regrets ever leaving it. Furthermore, their Kaia is still alive, Dark Kaia having treated her wound and left her the tools to survive before leaving her homeworld. Through the connection that still exists between them, Dark Kaia has learned of her world's peril and is frustrated when the Winchesters refuse to use Jack's powers to open the rift as it risks drawing God's attention. Dark Kaia explains that she had envied her counterpart's world and how peaceful it seemed, but found herself unable to fit in or enjoy it and instead lived in hiding. After seeing Kaia's situation through Dark Kaia's mind, Jack agrees to help and gets a Reaper named Merle to help him hide his use of powers so that he can open the rift. Dark Kaia leads the Winchesters back to her old home in The Bad Place where they are reunited with Kaia who has been living there. With The Bad Place on the verge of destruction, Dark Kaia refuses to leave with them and decides to die along with her homeworld, tearfully ordering them to go. Turning to face an approaching massive cloud of destruction, Dark Kaia closes her eyes and extends her arms as she is engulfed by the destruction.

=== Kelly Kline ===
Kelly Kline, portrayed by Courtney Ford, is the mother of Jack Kline. She was an aide to and lover of President Jefferson Rooney after the death of his wife. She first appears in "LOTUS", when Lucifer possesses the President and has sex with her, impregnating her. Crowley, realizing that a powerful nephilim has been conceived, teleports her to a motel room, where he, the Winchesters, Castiel, and Rowena explain the situation to her and try to convince her to abort the nephilim. Kelly agrees to help them lure Rooney in so they can use the Hyperbolic Pulse Generator to expel Lucifer from him. They succeed, but Kelly runs away from the motel room.

In "Family Feud", an angel sent by Heaven to get rid of the child of Lucifer finds Kelly on the run and attempts to kill her, but she is saved by Dagon, a Prince of Hell who was personally created by Lucifer. Kelly is persuaded by Dagon to accept her as her and her child's protector. In "The British Invasion", Kelly, uncomfortable with the situation, demands to see a doctor. Dagon agrees to take her, but when the doctor notices something on the sonogram, she controls him to tell her that everything is fine. Later, Sam, impersonating the doctor, tells Kelly to come back to the office. She is kidnapped by Dean, who takes her to a junkyard where Sam, Eileen Leahy, Mick Davies, and Renny Rawlings are waiting. Sam tries to explain that they just want to help her, but Dagon comes and takes her away again. In the melee, Eileen accidentally shoots Renny. Back at their hideout, Dagon handcuffs Kelly to the bed, no longer trusting her, and reveals that giving birth to a nephilim is always fatal to the mother.

In "The Future", Kelly, worried about her child being evil, attempts to kill herself, but the nephilim brings her back to life. Castiel, Kelvin, and Hozai come to the hideout to kill Kelly, but when Castiel reaches the basement he is unable to kill her. Castiel kidnaps her and takes her to a motel while he decides what to do. He decides to take her to the sandbox portal to Heaven, where Kelly and her child will die instantly but their souls will ascend to Heaven. Kelly, having seen visions from her child, now believes in its goodness. The Winchesters track them down and explain that they can extract the grace from the fetus so it will be born as a normal human being. Kelly refuses, as she believes her child has an important destiny, and drives off in the Impala with Castiel, having been told by her child that taking this path would lead to its birth. They are greeted at the sandbox by Joshua, who is then killed by Dagon. Sam and Dean arrive, and in the melee, Kelly takes Castiel's hand, lending him some of the nephilim's powers, which he uses to destroy Dagon. Castiel then takes Kelly to a safe place to give birth, having been shown by the nephilim a vision of a future paradise.

In "All Along the Watchtower", Kelly prepares for the birth of her child in a remote location with Castiel and laments that she will not be around to raise it. Kelly makes a video for her child to watch. As Kelly goes into labor, a rift into another universe opens up, and Mary Winchester comforts her through her contractions as they bond over their protectiveness of their respective sons. Kelly dies giving birth to a son, Jack.

In "Lost and Found", Jack states that Kelly is in Heaven. He recalls his connection with his mother in the womb, where he learned that Castiel was supposed to be his protector. Kelly is given a traditional Hunter's funeral. In "Patience", Jack watches the video Kelly made. In "The Big Empty", Jack shows grief counselor shapeshifter Mia the video and asks her to take his mother's form. Mia, in Kelly's form, comforts Jack and assures him he is not destined to be evil. In "Tombstone", Castiel tells Jack that Kelly would be proud of him.

In "Gods and Monsters", Jack visits his grandparents, Kelly's parents, claiming to be Kelly's friend, unable to tell them that she is dead or that he is their grandson. They show him photo albums with pictures of Kelly and remark on his resemblance to her.

During "Byzantium", Jack dies and ascends to Heaven but leaves his personal Heaven to find his mother's. Jack finds Kelly enjoying a childhood memory before approaching her and revealing his identity. Turning her back to her adult form, Kelly is greatly shocked and happy to meet him with the pair hugging. It takes Kelly a while to recall she is dead before she inquires on Jack's reasons for being present, Kelly soon realizes that he's dead too and breaks down but he comforts her that Castiel did protect him but something happened. Kelly asks what's bothering, as he explains a strange entity is chasing him. She hides her son and promises to stay by his side before Castiel arrives, having deduced Jack would be there. Castiel catches up with Kelly and soon tells them that Jack will be resurrected though part of his soul will be burned. Kelly is unsure about the idea, forcing Castiel to elaborate on the being chasing Jack, The Shadow, who wants to send him to The Empty, the resting place of angels. Kelly protects her son from the Shadow when it attacks, and witnesses Castiel make a deal with the entity to save Jack. Kelly then says goodbye to Jack, telling him to have a great life, before Castiel takes him back to Earth, resurrected. In "Moriah", Jack learns that Kelly's parents have learned that she is missing and possibly dead.

In season 15's "Destiny's Child", one of the memories that Jack experiences as his soul is restored is of talking with Kelly in Heaven. In "Inherit the Earth", after becoming the new God, Jack tells Sam and Dean that it is because of what he learned from them, Kelly, and Castiel that he is ready for his new responsibilities.

=== Jimmy Novak ===
James "Jimmy" Novak, portrayed by Misha Collins, is the vessel of Castiel and a former radio ad salesman from Pontiac, Illinois. He is described by Castiel as a "devout man" who agreed to become Castiel's vessel after hearing his voice and undergoing a series of tests of faith. In "The Rapture", after Castiel is forcibly taken back to Heaven for "re-conditioning", Jimmy is left alone and found by Sam and Dean. He describes being possessed by Castiel as "being chained to a comet". He wishes to return to his family, but Sam and Dean insist that he would put them in danger from the demons hunting him down for his association with angels. Jimmy sneaks back home to reunite with his family, but he and his family are attacked by demons, and his wife Amelia and daughter Claire are kidnapped. Castiel returns and possesses Claire to vanquish the demons. Jimmy is fatally injured in the fight, and Castiel tells him he will now be at peace in Heaven. Jimmy begs Castiel to use him as a vessel instead of Claire to spare her the life of being an angel's vessel. Castiel accepts and possesses Jimmy again.

Castiel reveals to Jimmy's daughter Claire that Jimmy has been dead and his soul in Heaven, since his vessel was destroyed in his first confrontation with Raphael in "Lucifer Rising". Jimmy was reunited in Heaven with his wife Amelia after her death in "Angel Heart". In "All Along the Watchtower", Castiel uses Jimmy's name to rent a cabin for himself and Kelly Kline. After tracking the omens to the area, the Winchesters realize they have found the right spot when they learn Castiel used the name James Novak since that is his vessel. After Castiel's death in the same episode, the Winchesters give him a Hunter's Funeral by burning Jimmy's body in "Lost & Found." When Castiel is resurrected, Jimmy's body is restored to act as his vessel once again.

As seen in season 13's "Exodus", the Apocalypse World Castiel also chose his world's Jimmy as his vessel unlike most of the angels of that world who have different vessels. The Apocalypse World Castiel's version of Jimmy has a darker more scruffier appearance, coinciding with the alternate Castiel's evil nature. He also appears to be blind in one eye. This Jimmy and Castiel are killed by the Winchesters Castiel.

In season 14's "Gods and Monsters", Castiel talks about Jimmy with Lucifer's former vessel Nick. Castiel admits that while Jimmy was willing to be his vessel, he is dead, causing Nick to call Castiel a stone-cold body snatcher that is no better than Lucifer. Castiel tells Nick that in his millennia of existence, what befell Jimmy and his family is Castiel's greatest regret.

=== Kevin Tran ===
Kevin, portrayed by Osric Chau, is a Prophet of the Lord who is chosen to interpret the Word of God after Sam and Dean break it out of the slab of stone it is trapped in. He is in advanced placement and is preparing for college when he is struck by lightning and chosen. Kevin is driven to drive his mother's car to the mental institution where Castiel is and where Sam and Dean have taken the Word. He steals the Word, but Sam and Meg catch him. Castiel reveals that Kevin is a Prophet and can thus read the tablet which talks about the Leviathans.

After two angels arrive to take him away and are driven away by Dean, they take him to Rufus' Cabin where they set him to work on translating the tablet. The angels return, but after Meg kills one to save Castiel, the others allow Kevin to finish the translation before taking him home. Kevin reunites with his mother, but they discover to their horror that the detective investigating his disappearance is the Leviathan Edgar in disguise. Edgar kills the two angels accompanying Kevin and takes him and his mother prisoner.

Dick Roman later uses Kevin's mother to force Kevin to translate the tablet for him. After the Leviathans bring in a girl named Polly, Kevin manages to escape the room he's trapped in and learns of Dick's plan to poison coffee creamers to kill all the skinny people in the world, but is captured by Dick's assistant Susan before he can escape the building. During Sam, Dean and Castiel's break-in of Sucrocorp, Sam finds and rescues Kevin who reveals Dick's new plan to him and insists they need to blow up Dick's laboratory.

In the lab, they find Dean and Castiel killing Dick and Kevin is shocked when Dean and Castiel disappear when Dick explodes. Kevin nervously tells Sam they have to leave because more Leviathans will be coming, but Crowley shows up and reveals he has it taken care of and kidnaps Kevin as a prize. It is later revealed that he wants Kevin to translate another Word of God tablet so he can learn how to open all the gates of Hell and release every demon in existence upon the world. Kevin tricks Crowley and escapes, going on the run for a year before Sam and Dean catch up to him. Kevin reveals that he has learned that it is possible to seal the gates of Hell forever and banish all demons from the Earth from the tablet and Sam and Dean decide to do so with his help.

However, Crowley catches up with them and although they escape thanks to Kevin's quick thinking, Crowley murders his girlfriend in revenge. Kevin later convinces Sam and Dean to take him to see his mom who is surrounded by demons. After they rescue her, Mrs. Tran joins them in closing the gates of Hell, but they find the tablet stolen and being sold at an auction. Kevin's mom wins the auction by bidding her soul, but Crowley possesses her and gets away with the tablet. In the struggle, Dean tries to kill Crowley even though he is possessing Kevin's mother and in doing so, loses Kevin's trust. This along with the fact that Crowley warned him that the Winchesters have a habit of using people up and disposing of them when they no longer need them, causes Kevin to flee with his mother. He spends the next several episodes on the run from both Crowley and the Winchesters, but after his mother hires a witch to get the ingredients needed for the spell he used to kill the demons and escape, Crowley captures and tortures him to force him to translate the tablet. Sam, Dean and Castiel, who are alerted to his situation when Mrs. Tran calls them for help, arrive and rescue Kevin and get half of the tablet, but Crowley gets the other half and Kevin loses a finger, though Castiel is able to regrow it. They then call in Garth to look after the Trans and he takes them to his houseboat where Kevin works on translating the half of the tablet he has to no avail. Dean and Castiel later go to Kevin for help in preparing more demon bombs to rescue the angel Samandriel.

Kevin is now so focused on translating the tablet that he has somewhat let himself go and has a disheveled appearance. He has also sent his own mother away so he can work in solitude, explaining to Dean that he can't enjoy the world he is trying to save until it is saved. Though he does not believe it is possible to get the ingredients needed for the bomb as they are rare, he gives them the list and Castiel is able to get them. It is shown in "Trial and Error" that Kevin lets himself go completely while he focuses on translating the tablet, believing that closing the gates of Hell will be the only way he can go back to a normal life. Eventually, after weeks of non-stop work, he cracks the instructions and calls Sam and Dean to let them know. Kevin learns that to close the gates, someone must complete three trials and recite an Enochian spell after each one. Kevin has only cracked the first trial which is to kill a hellhound and bathe in its blood. Despite Sam's advice to slow down, Kevin begins taking stimulants to keep awake and eventually calls Sam and Dean to inform them that he has learned that hellhounds are usually invisible but can be seen through an object scorched with Holy Fire, giving them a way to see the hellhound so they can kill it. In "Taxi Driver", Kevin is under so much stress that he is hallucinating Crowley in his head and that Crowley is mentally torturing him. Panicked, he calls Sam and Dean and hides, but has also deciphered the second trial: Sam must rescue an innocent soul from Hell and release it into Heaven. After Sam leaves to rescue Bobby Singer's soul from Hell, Dean stays with Kevin, trying to calm him down. Kevin is so freaked out he hides in a closet and later hides his half of the tablet somewhere, believing it will take the pressure off of him. After Dean leaves, Kevin demon-proofs Garth's houseboat even more, but Crowley shows up and reveals he killed Kevin's mother and got his location from her smartphone. When Sam and Dean return they find the boat deserted. In "The Great Escapist", Kevin is trapped in an illusion of Garth's houseboat and is tricked into translating Crowley's half of the demon tablet by demons pretending to be Sam and Dean. At the same time, a prerecorded message Kevin prepared is sent to Sam and Dean with his notes on the tablet. While Sam and Dean do not figure out the trial from them, they eventually lead them to Metatron, the angelic scribe who wrote the Word of God. Eventually Kevin realizes the truth as the demons are too polite and sends them into a trap. Crowley confronts him and Kevin refuses to reveal more than the fact that Crowley has no idea the power he could have gotten from his half of the demon tablet and that he won't break. Not caring as he has the angel tablet, Crowley strangles Kevin who is rescued by Metatron. Metatron takes Kevin back to the hotel where he lives and heals him and Kevin reveals that he has Crowley's half of the demon tablet with him. With that half of the tablet, Kevin has learned the third trial: cure a demon. Kevin is left confused as to who Metatron is when Metatron reveals knowledge of the third trial as well. After Sam and Dean pretend to make a deal with Crowley to stop him killing people they have saved, Kevin digs up the first half of the demon tablet and reunites the two halves, giving the tablet to Sam and Dean who send him to the Men of Letters bunker for safety. When Dean and Castiel need to know the third trial to close the gates of Heaven, they take the angel tablet to Kevin who is distraught as he believed that it would be over once he was done with the demon tablet, causing an angry Castiel to yell at him that he is a Prophet until he dies. After completing the second trial, Dean calls Kevin who tells him that while he has found trials on the angel tablet, he does not see anything that matches what they have done. When Naomi shows up to tell Dean and Castiel that Metatron is really trying to expel all angels from Heaven, Kevin listens, but is unable to confirm what she has said. He later tries to leave the bunker, but stops when alarms start going off, signaling the fall of all angels to Earth.

After the angels fall, Kevin is left trapped in the bunker as it locks down and he panics, nearly shooting Dean with a crossbow when he arrives. Kevin is not happy to see that the Winchesters have Crowley captive and have not killed him. Kevin is put to work trying to find a way to reverse Metatron's spell using the angel tablet. When Dean calls Kevin to get him to confirm their cover at a military base, Kevin succeeds by hacking into the person he is talking to's computer and blackmailing them. He later gets a call from Abaddon and passes on her message to Sam and Dean and at their request, looks through the archives for a way to kill a Knight of Hell. Crowley, who is in a dungeon in the next room, taunts Kevin, causing Kevin to beat him with a sledgehammer. Crowley then claims that he never killed Kevin's mother and will lead Kevin to her if he releases him and that the Winchesters are just using him. While Kevin does not release Crowley, he decides to leave and look for his mother but is stopped by Dean who convinces him that his mother is as good as dead even if she is still alive. Dean tells him that the Winchesters consider both him and Castiel to be family and would die to protect him if need be. Kevin aids Sam and Dean with finding a spell to communicate with animals and is later asked by Dean to find a way to suppress an angel. Kevin finds a way, but is murdered by Gadreel possessing Sam soon afterwards on Metatron's orders. Dean burns his body in a Hunter's Funeral afterwards and is devastated by and blames himself for Kevin's death. A month after his death, Kevin returns as a ghost, having been stuck in the veil between worlds due to Heaven being closed. Kevin asks Sam and Dean to rescue his mother who he has learned from another ghost named Candy is still alive. With Candy's help, Sam and Dean track down Linda who tearfully reunites with Kevin. Despite the risks, Linda decides to take the ring Kevin is attached to and look after him until he can enter Heaven. Kevin similarly wants to look after his mother now that he has her back. Kevin informs Sam that he does not blame him for his death, aware that it was really Gadreel and asks Sam and Dean to put aside their differences and start being brothers again before leaving.

Two years later in "All in the Family", Kevin's ghost is called in by God in the form of Chuck Shurley to reassure the Winchesters that they can trust Him. The Winchesters are shocked to see Kevin who tells them that they can trust Chuck and that whatever He has planned for them, He must believe they can do it. Kevin tells the Winchesters that he's fine for someone who is dead before Chuck tells Kevin that he has been stuck in the veil between life and death for too long. With a wave of His hand, Chuck causes Kevin's soul to ascend to its rightful place in Heaven.

In season 15's "Raising Hell", Kevin unexpectedly returns to help Dean and Arthur Ketch against the souls God released from Hell. Kevin explains that God lied about sending him to Heaven and instead cast Kevin's soul into Hell where he was released when God opened all the doors of Hell. Due to being cast into Hell by God himself, Kevin's reputation allows him to push around the other souls and he attempts to help in the plan to trap the souls. However, Francis Tumblety, also known as Jack the Ripper, learned from demons about Kevin's connection to the Winchesters and the ghosts turn against him. After a failed attempt to use Kevin as leverage, the escaped ghosts, aside from Kevin, are trapped in a crystal by Rowena. Afterwards, having learned from Belphegor that being cast into Hell means he can never get into Heaven, Kevin requests to be released from the barrier so that he can wander the Earth as a ghost. Though being an untethered ghost means he might eventually go crazy, Kevin prefers that fate to returning to an eternity of torture in Hell. After a final goodbye with the Winchesters, Kevin leaves through a doorway Belphegor opens in the barrier and vanishes to wander the world.

==== Apocalypse World Kevin Tran ====
In season 13's "War of the Worlds", an alternate universe Kevin appears as a Prophet loyal to Michael in Apocalypse World. He meets Lucifer and the latter informs him of his counterpart's status, which shocks him. Having a more black-and-white view of the world, Kevin sees Lucifer as evil due to his status as the Devil and apparently can't tell that Michael is just using him and doesn't care either way as Michael promises him a better life once he gets to the Winchesters world. Kevin finds a spell on the Angel Tablet that will open a rift to the Winchesters' universe, but it requires the grace of an archangel so Michael drains some of Lucifer's. Kevin's spell succeeds in opening a rift, but Lucifer uses the opportunity to escape through the rift which closes behind him. Kevin is excited by his success despite the fact that the spell only opens the rift long enough for one person to go through. Kevin is ordered by Michael to fix the problem.

This version of Kevin and his actions are subsequently mentioned by Lucifer to Castiel after they reunite following Lucifer's escape from Apocalypse World. Lucifer warns Castiel of the danger of Kevin working to open another rift for Michael who intends to invade their world. Castiel later shares the story with the Winchesters in "Devil's Bargain." After hearing how Kevin used the Angel Tablet to find a way to open the rift, the Winchesters bring in Prophet Donatello Redfield to search the Demon Tablet for a similar spell. Though Donatello succeeds in "Good Intentions", his lack of a soul in comparison to Kevin causes the tablet's power to corrupt him.

In "Unfinished Business", Kevin is found by Jack, Mary Winchester and a few resistance fighters in Michael's abandoned fortress. Kevin claims to have perfected the spell from the Angel Tablet for Michael who intends to use it to open a rift and lead and invasion of the Winchesters' universe. As Jack prepares to go after Michael, Kevin reveals that he has been left behind as a trap to break Jack by showing him that he can't protect everyone. Having been promised by Michael that he will be reunited with his mother in Heaven, a desperate Kevin refuses to be talked down and activates a sigil burned into his chest that effectively turns Kevin into a suicide bomb. The blast kills Kevin and three resistance fighters, though Jack survives unharmed and shields Mary from the blast's effects. As Michael hoped, the suicide bombing devastates Jack from his inability to protect the people he cares about. Its later shown that Kevin also lied about perfecting the spell for Michael and that the lie was a part of the trap as Michael had no way to open a rift until Lucifer provided him with the spell from the Demon Tablet in "Exodus."

=== Lisa Braeden ===
Lisa Braeden, portrayed by Cindy Sampson, is a woman Dean spent a weekend with around 1999. In the third-season episode "The Kids Are Alright", Dean decides to visit Lisa and he discovers she has an eight-year-old son named Ben who shares his cocky attitude and love of classic rock. After Ben is kidnapped by a changeling who committed the murders, Dean rescues Ben. She returns in season three when Deans sees her in his dream in "Dream a Little Dream of Me"

She also makes a brief appearance at the end of Season 5, Episode 17, where Dean visits her.

She returns again in season six, where her and Dean are in a relationship. Her memory is eventually wiped by Castiel toward the end of the season, since Dean wants her away from the hunting lifestyle.

=== Mick Davies ===
Michael "Mick" Davies is an operative from the British Men of Letters, portrayed by Adam Fergus. When he was a young boy, Mick was orphaned and spent some time living on the streets. In an attempt to get some money, he picked the pocket of a member of the British Men of Letters and accidentally stole a cursed coin. The British Men of Letters saw potential within Mick and sent him to the Kendricks School. At the Kendricks Academy, Mick was best friends with a boy named Timothy. He was also classmates with Arthur Ketch who called them "survivors" when describing their experience years later.

One day in 1987, Mick and Timothy were pulled into the office of Doctor Hess, the Headmistress and one of the British Men of Letters Elders. To ensure they would follow the code absolutely, Doctor Hess left them a knife and told them only one of them could leave the room alive. While Timothy wanted to run, Mick reluctantly killed his best friend, per the code. This event would haunt him for the rest of his life.

In "Season 12, Mamma Mia", Mick comes to America to return Toni Bevell to London, where she'll face consequences after establishing that she's gone way off her original mission, which was to identify American hunters and gain their trust.

He first discovers Ms. Watt's corpse and calls Toni to inform her of his intentions, calling her a "bad girl". After Toni has a face-off with Mary Winchester, Mick arrives with Castiel at her location. He insists that he and the British Men of Letters wish to work with the Winchesters and he even gives them his number, but they don't trust him.

In the car, he tells Toni that she must fly back to London, and that Mr. Ketch, whom he's already called, will take it from here.

In "LOTUS", Sam calls Mick for help with Lucifer but hangs up when he gets Mick's voicemail. Realizing that the Winchesters are likely in trouble, Mick sends Arthur Ketch to help them, resulting in Arthur rescuing them from the Secret Service and supplying them with a device capable of exorcising Lucifer.

In "First Blood", Mick is shown using a typewriter to discuss some of the events that were occurring in the episode. He is writing to his superiors, and he mainly talks about the Winchesters and American hunters in general. He is first shown trying to convince a hunter named Wally to work for the British Men of Letters. Wally's rejection leads Mick to remark that American hunters are "difficult". He then talks about Sam and Dean, who managed to escape Site 94, but they left survivors behind. He then remarks that it is Arthur Ketch's purpose to clean up "loose ends". He describes how Arthur took over Site 94 before the Government decided to shut it down completely. Lastly, Mick is shown talking to Mary Winchester, offering her the same things he offered Wally, but Mary shows interest instead.

In "The Raid", Mick leads an operation with several American hunters to wipe out all of the vampires in America. Within a month, Mick's operation wipes out two hundred and thirty of the two hundred and forty one vampires in the Midwest. After Mary gets Sam to check out his operation, Mick shows him around and includes him in a briefing of their planned attack on the final vampire nest in the Midwest.

Shortly afterwards, the compound comes under attack by vampires and Mick is shocked to learn that the Alpha Vampire is behind it as the British Men of Letters intel places him in Morocco for at least a decade. Mick is further shocked when Sam admits to having seen the Alpha Vampire in Hoople, North Dakota five years before. When Mary calls for everyone to show any weapons they possess, Mick has nothing useful and admits to having never taken a life before. While discussing options for taking down the Alpha Vampire, Mary has Mick show Sam the Colt, the one weapon the British Men of Letters possess capable of harming the Alpha. Sam is able to provide Mick with a ritual created by Bobby Singer to make more bullets for the Colt and Mick performs it moments before the Alpha Vampire breaks in and kills two hunters.

After killing the two hunters, the Alpha Vampire announces his intention to force Mick to contact his superiors and tell them the mission failed before draining Mick on camera. Before he can follow through on his threat, Sam and Mary return and Sam arms himself with the empty Colt. As Sam negotiates with the Alpha Vampire, Mick discreetly shows him the bullet for the Colt he has palmed and then attacks Sam in apparent anger after Sam offers Mick up to the Alpha Vampire in exchange for the safety of himself and his family. In reality, Mick slips Sam the Colt bullet which he loads thanks to a distraction from Mary. As Mick and Mary watch, Sam kills the Alpha Vampire with the Colt.

Following the battle, Mick berates Arthur Ketch who had been trying to recruit Dean in his own way and was thus away during the battle. Sam tells Mick that he is now in as despite everything that went wrong, they kill the Alpha Vampire and Mick's operation is making the world a better place.

In "Somewhere Between Heaven and Hell", Mick sends Sam text messages with cases for the Winchesters to take. As Mick calls him at the end of the episode, Sam admits the truth to Dean who decides to give Mick a chance.

In "Ladies Drink Free", Mick brings the Winchesters a werewolf case and asks to accompany them to get actual experience in the field. Though reluctant, Dean agrees to take Mick along. While the Winchesters talk to victim Hayden Foster's mother, Mick disguises himself as a doctor and examines her wounds, discovering that she has been bitten. Mick lies to the Winchesters about it and returns that night to kill Hayden with a silver nitrate injection as per British Men of Letters protocol, something he is visibly reluctant to do. After Hayden awakens and attacks him, clawing open Mick's shoulder, Mick uses the silver nitrate injection to kill her.

The next day, Mick joins the Winchesters in investigating Hayden's "mysterious" death, seeming conflicted by his actions. He later accompanies Dean to a bar to interrogate Hayden's boyfriend with his behavior drawing Dean's suspicions. Dean realizes that Mick murdered Hayden and is enraged by his actions since Hayden was an innocent sixteen-year-old girl and as a pureblood werewolf, could have controlled herself.

After Claire Novak is bitten, Mick advocates killing her while Sam wants to try a cure the British Men of Letters invented involving injecting the newly turned werewolf with the blood of their sire. As the Winchesters go to track down Claire's sire, they leave Mick with Claire, warning him that if he kills her, they will kill Mick. As Claire starts to turn, she begs Mick to kill her, believing that she cannot control herself. However, while Mick admits that all of his instincts are telling him to do it, he's starting to understand that his instincts are wrong and instead plans to tie up and sedate Claire. They are then attacked by Claire's sire, Justin, who kidnaps Claire and knocks Mick unconscious.

The Winchesters return to find Claire gone and Mick waking up. Mick tells them that they can track Claire as he slipped a tracking device into her coat. Finding Justin's home through Mick's tracking device, Mick and Sam attack Justin with Mick jabbing Justin in the back with a syringe to get his blood. However, they are both quickly thrown off and Justin attacks Dean. Before Justin can kill Dean, Mick kills Justin with a silver bullet to the heart from behind. Mick then removes the vial of blood from Justin's back and uses it to cure Claire. The next morning, the Winchesters thank Mick for giving them a win and give him a second chance as a result. Mick is amazed by Claire's survival and curing and calls her a miracle to which Dean agrees with him.

In "The British Invasion", Mick is haunted by memories of murdering his best friend Timothy as a child and visits the Men of Letters bunker where he spends all night drinking with the Winchesters after learning about Lucifer's child. The next morning, Mick receives word from Doctor Hess that they don't have time to convince the American hunters to join them and orders Mick to "assimilate or eliminate" them and sends her lackey Renny Rawlings to keep an eye on him.

Mick and Renny join the Winchesters' attempt to capture Kelly Kline. While initially successful, Dagon shows up, shrugs off all of their attacks and escapes. Eileen Leahy tries to kill Dagon with the Colt, but she teleports away, causing the bullet to kill Renny. Mick initially tries to kill Eileen per the British Men of Letters code, but Sam convinces Mick to follow his own code instead and he orders them to go. Later, Mick returns to his headquarters to find Arthur Ketch and Doctor Hess. Having learned his lesson from working with the Winchesters, Mick defends the Winchesters way of doing things as opposed to the British Men of Letters code. Mick tells Doctor Hess that their code would have a young boy murder his best friend but he's no longer a boy, he's a man now. In response, Doctor Hess signals Arthur who shoots Mick in the back of the head at point-blank range with a silenced pistol, killing him. Standing over Mick's body, Doctor Hess announces that the experiment with the American hunters is a failure and they are going to kill the Winchesters now.

In "The Memory Remains", Arthur sends the Winchesters an email posing as Mick to send them on a case to get them out of the bunker. He poses as Mick again later in a text message to check that they are in fact gone. When the Winchesters call Mick to check in, Arthur answers and claims that Mick was recalled to London and "has a lot to answer for" after what happened with Dagon so they will now report to him.

In "Twigs & Twine & Tasha Banes", Mary starts to get suspicious about Mick's disappearance as he hasn't responded to her phone calls or emails for weeks. Afterwards, Mary gets an email from "Mick" claiming that he is to remain in London for a few more weeks. Hearing Arthur talking about a package in the armory, Mary checks it out and discovers a box containing Mick's body, upsetting Mary. After finding Mick's body and finding information on hunters being chased by the British Men of Letters, Mary confronts Arthur who claims he was killed by a werewolf. However, Mary quickly realizes that Arthur is lying and in fact killed Mick himself since he was shot in the head which a werewolf is unlikely to do.

In "There's Something About Mary", after learning of the British Men of Letters attack on American hunters, the Winchesters capture Lady Toni Bevell for answers. When they question what Mick thinks about it, Toni reveals that Mick is dead, much to their obvious shock and grief as the Winchesters had genuinely liked Mick.

=== Missouri Moseley ===
Missouri Moseley, portrayed by Loretta Devine, is a very talented psychic residing in Lawrence, Kansas. She was a long-time friend of John Winchester. Missouri first met John on December 17, 1983, when he came to her for a reading. She said it was 'a few days after' Mary was murdered. Missouri said she was the one who opened his eyes to 'what was in the dark.' John took Missouri to his house, hoping she could tell him what killed Mary. Unfortunately, Missouri could not tell what it was, just that it was "real evil". Twelve years later, Missouri returns in season 13's "Patience." Missouri, who is revealed to also be a former hunter, contacts the Winchesters for help when a monster targeting psychics kills her protégé. Missouri helps Dean and Jody Mills determine that they are dealing with a Wraith and she receives a premonition of her own death. Missouri sends Dean and Jody away to protect her granddaughter Patience Turner, who is also a powerful psychic and allows the Wraith to kill her, having seen that this is the path that will ensure its destruction. With help from Patience, Dean kills the Wraith and avenges Missouri's death while also fulfilling her last wish to see her granddaughter protected. In the process, Patience learns that her father lied to her for most of her life about her grandmother.

=== Nick ===
Nick, portrayed by Mark Pellegrino, is a widower and Lucifer's primary and most well known vessel. Though Nick himself only initially appears in person in season 5's "Sympathy for the Devil", he plays a major role from seasons five to thirteen as Lucifer's vessel. He subsequently joins the main cast in season 14 after the death of Lucifer.

In season 5's "Sympathy for the Devil", Nick, who has recently lost his wife Sarah and son Teddy in a brutal home invasion, is tormented by visions created by Lucifer regarding the loss of his family. Lucifer, appearing in the form of Nick's dead wife, approaches Nick openly eventually and asks for Nick's permission to take Nick as his vessel. Though Lucifer can't bring back Nick's family, he offers Nick the chance to get revenge against God and explains his version of why God threw Lucifer out of Heaven. Nick ultimately consents to becoming Lucifer's vessel.

Subsequently, Nick appears throughout season 5 as Lucifer's vessel. In "Free to Be You and Me", Lucifer visits Sam in Nick's form and explains that Sam is actually Lucifer's one true vessel. Nick was just a backup plan and can barely contain Lucifer without spontaneously combusting which is not a problem that Lucifer would face with Sam. As a result of Lucifer's sheer power, Nick's body slowly degrades over season 5 as Lucifer's power burns him out and he develops ever worsening skin lesions. Several characters note the state of Nick's body over the course of the season with Castiel stating in "Two Minutes to Midnight" that Lucifer has to drink gallons of demon blood just to keep it intact at all. In "Swan Song", after Sam says yes to Lucifer, he abandons Nick's body for Sam's. Nick is left dead on the ground, completely burned out from containing Lucifer for nearly a year.

In season 7, Sam's hallucinations of Lucifer take on the form of Nick. In season 11's "O Brother, Where Art Thou?" and "The Devil in the Details", Lucifer manifests in Hell to communicate with Sam. In "Hell's Angel", despite having Castiel as his vessel at the time, Lucifer takes on Nick's form in Castiel's mind to battle Crowley when he tries to get Castiel to expel Lucifer. When Lucifer is yanked out of Castiel's body in "We Happy Few" by the Darkness, an image of Nick is briefly overlaid over Castiel as Lucifer is expelled.

In season 12's "Stuck in the Middle (With You)" and "Family Feud", Lucifer is revealed to be imprisoned in Nick's body rather than the Cage after he was exorcised from the President of the United States in "LOTUS." In "Family Feud", Crowley explains to Lucifer that his demons found Nick's body a few years before and Crowley had it repaired and upgraded so that it could serve as the perfect vessel and perfect prison for the archangel who was sent into Nick when Crowley perverted Rowena's spell to send him back to the Cage. Crowley's improvements keep Nick's body from degrading again and he remains a sound vessel for Lucifer without fear of burning out like Lucifer's previous vessels aside from Sam did. Although Crowley installs a security system in Nick's body to control Lucifer, it is reversed upon Crowley with the help of Drexel in "There's Something About Mary" and Lucifer gains full control over his vessel. After his escape, Doctor Hess shows Sam surveillance photos of Lucifer on the loose again in "Who We Are" and Sam believes her as he recognizes Lucifer's old vessel.

Throughout the second half of season 12 and all of season 13, Nick acts as Lucifer's permanent vessel. Lucifer is eventually killed by Dean in "Let the Good Times Roll", leaving Nick's body lying on the floor of a church surrounded by the burned impressions of Lucifer's wings.

In season 14's "Stranger in a Strange Land", Nick is revealed to still be alive, living in a makeshift bedroom in the Men of Letters bunker's dungeon. Sam speculates that as the archangel blade is designed to kill the archangel inside and not the vessel, it left Nick unharmed aside from a slowly healing wound in his side where he was stabbed. Nick has nightmares of his time under Lucifer's control and Sam and Mary Winchester have a hard time looking at him due to his long possession by Lucifer and thus his resemblance to him. Nick is able to remember that Michael told Lucifer that he wanted to "do it right this time", but can't provide Sam with any more useful information than that on Michael's plans.

In "Gods and Monsters", Nick is visited by Castiel in his room where Nick experiences flashbacks of the things Lucifer forced him to do. Castiel reminds Nick that it was the murder of Nick's family that caused Nick to consent to Lucifer's possession, causing Nick to experience flashbacks of how Lucifer tortured him to get Nick to say "yes". Nick digs into the murder of his family and discovers that the case has never been solved in all the years since the murder, enraging him. As Nick displays uncharacteristically aggressive and Lucifer-like behavior, Castiel determines that though Lucifer is gone, he may have done more damage to Nick's psyche than they realized. In an attempt to solve his family's murders and get revenge, Nick visits his old neighbor Arty who was a witness to a man running out of his house the night of the murders, but subsequently changed his story. Believing someone to have gotten to Arty, Nick attacks him and demands to know the truth. Nick later bashes Arty's head in with a hammer, the same way his family was murdered. In "The Scar", Castiel tells Sam and the returned Dean that Nick took off claiming that he had personal matters to attend to and hasn't been returning Castiel's phone calls since.

In "Unhuman Nature", Nick continues his bloody quest for revenge, torturing a priest whom Arty had confessed to and then brutally murdering him when the priest refuses to break his vows and tell Nick what he knows. Nick then meets with the reporter who covered his family's murders in hopes of learning something useful. At Nick's request, the reporter reveals that a man named Frank Kellogg was the beat cop in Nick's neighborhood at the time of the murders. Nick is subsequently tempted to murder a prostitute, but stops himself. Nick tracks down and tortures Frank, having learned from Arty that he had seen a cop running out of Nick's house at the time of the murder and then been threatened by the police into silence. Frank finally reveals that he responded to a 911 call from Nick's wife reporting a prowler only to meet a man named Abraxas outside of Nick's house and then wake up in his police cruiser covered in Sarah's blood. Nick realizes that Abraxas was a demon who possessed Frank to murder Nick's family. Even though Nick acknowledges that the murders weren't Frank's fault, he still beats the man to death with a hammer regardless as Frank's hands were used to butcher his wife and son. In the aftermath, Nick prays to Lucifer, having realized that he enjoyed the freedom that came with expressing his inner darkness and is now missing the fallen archangel. In the Empty, a skeletal figure rises with glowing red eyes, presumably Lucifer awakened by Nick's prayer.

In "Damaged Goods", Nick continues his revenge quest by capturing and torturing demons to find Abraxas. Nick finally learns that Abraxas was captured by Mary Winchester while he was slaughtering a Girl Scout troop and sets out to Hibbing, Minnesota to find Mary. Nick's behavior alarms a local grocery store clerk who calls local Sheriff Donna Hanscum who discovers that the van Nick is driving is stolen while his fingerprints show Nick as being wanted for his murder spree. Nick subdues Donna and tracks Mary down through Donna's phone, kidnapping Mary who admits that she locked Abraxas in an Enochian puzzle box when she couldn't defeat him. Nick forces Mary to lead him to the storage unit where Abraxas is located and kidnaps a security guard to act as Abraxas' vessel. Nick frees Abraxas who offers him answers in exchange for Nick murdering Mary. Before he can, Nick is confronted by the Winchesters who tracked him down with Donna's help. Nick breaks the devil's trap and Abraxas attacks before revealing that he murdered Nick's family on Lucifer's orders and that Nick was chosen, although for no special reason. While Abraxas is distracted by Dean, Nick kills him with an angel blade to avenge his wife and son and is then subdued by Donna and Mary. Nick is arrested by Donna for his murder spree and justifies his actions as necessary to get revenge. Sam apologizes for not being able to save Nick or his victims, who will haunt Nick for the rest of his life.

In "Prophet and Loss", Nick escapes after brutally beating up a cop and returns to his old house where he encounters the ghost of his wife Sarah. Even though Nick has gotten her revenge by killing Abraxas, Sarah can't rest due to Nick's inability to give up Lucifer. Unable to give Lucifer up even for Sarah, Nick departs to continue his search for the archangel.

In "Game Night", Nick kidnaps the prophet Donatello Redfield and claims to have injected him with thallium. Nick resists the Winchesters' attempts to get him to reveal Donatello's location and enjoys taunting them. Finally, he agrees to lead them to Donatello while Jack discovers that Nick injected Donatello with angel grace, not poison. Nick explains that he used Donatello as a conduit to communicate with Lucifer in the Empty and intends to bring him back. Nick bashes Sam's head in with a rock, leaving him severely injured, before fleeing to an abandoned cabin to perform a spell Lucifer gave him using Jack's blood. Nick succeeds in bringing Lucifer back from the Empty, but is interrupted by Jack and Mary. Jack sends Lucifer back to the Empty and causes Nick to burn up from the inside, killing him before healing Sam's injuries. Nick's body is later found by Sam and Dean in "Absence." Sam covers up Nick's body with a blanket, but it is apparently otherwise just left in the abandoned cabin. Despite wanting Nick dead, Sam is horrified by the brutal manner of his demise.

In season 15's "Inherit the Earth", a resurrected Lucifer returns in the form of Nick. However, it's unclear if Nick was resurrected as well. When Lucifer is killed for a second time by Michael, he explodes into ash, leaving nothing of Nick behind.

=== Pamela Barnes ===
Pamela Barnes, portrayed by Traci Dinwiddie, is a friend of Bobby Singer. A skilled psychic, she is bold and aggressive. Bobby calls upon her assistance in discovering what pulled Dean Winchester out of Hell in season 4. She holds a seance and discovers it is a being named Castiel. In attempting to get a glimpse of Castiel, her eyes are burnt out and she becomes permanently blind. However, her psychic abilities appear to enable her to perceive her surroundings. The Winchesters again seek her assistance in finding out why Anna Milton can hear angels speak. She expresses an interest in "dicking over" angels because one caused the loss of her sight. She places Anna under hypnosis, which restores to Anna her memories of being an angel. She is called upon one more time by the Winchesters, to help them perform astral projections of themselves. While doing so, she is mortally wounded by a demon, but as her dying act, whispers a warning to Sam to stop using the demonic forces within him. In season 5's "Dark Side of the Moon", the Winchester brothers encounter Pamela in Heaven, who is happy residing in her own private paradise.

Pamela reappears in season 14's "Nihilism" where, in the world Michael created for Dean in his mind, he owns a bar with Pamela and is happy, experiencing a looped existence. When Sam and Castiel enter Dean's mind, they are surprised to find Pamela present and after they remind Dean of her blindness and death respectively, Pamela becomes blind and then disappears, having only been a construct of Dean's imagination.

=== Toni Bevell ===
Lady Antonia "Toni" Bevell, portrayed by Elizabeth Blackmore, is a Woman of Letters from British Men of Letters.

In "Season 11, Alpha and Omega", Toni returns to her home in London only to get a call that something bad is happening. She heads to her basement where she observes a bulletin board decorated with information on the Winchester family.

She bids her sleeping son goodbye and prepares to head out. Her servant gives her a few weapons before she leaves.

When Sam and Castiel return to the Bunker after the sun was restored to normal, she uses the angel banishing sigil on Castiel and tells Sam that she is a member of the British Men of Letters. When she asks about Dean, Sam tells her he's dead.

Toni tells Sam that she has come to take him to see the Boss at the London Chapter of the Men of Letters. She accuses him of playing with things - Archangels, Leviathans, the Darkness - bigger than he can handle. She soon fires a gun at him, leaving Sam's fate uncertain.

In "Season 12, Keep Calm and Carry On", Toni brings Sam, who she shot in the leg, to Dr. Marion to have his injuries treated, paying him with $100,000 to not ask questions. Taking him to a farmhouse, Toni explains that the British Men of Letters have kept Britain safe from monsters for forty years and want to do the same with America. To this end, she demands information on all of the hunters in America, their leadership and how to contact them. When Sam refuses to tell her, Toni has Ms. Watt torture him for the information, but he continues to refuse. Though Ms. Watt suggests bringing in Mr. Ketch, Toni refuses as she doesn't like the man and instead decides to resort to mental torture, causing Sam to have hallucinations of dead people in an attempt to break his mind. However, when Dean calls her and threatens Toni if she doesn't turn over Sam, she sends Ms. Watt to kill him. Eventually, Sam apparently commits suicide as a result of his hallucinations, but in actuality tricks Toni and briefly overpowers her. Sam nearly escapes, but Toni manages to lock him in the basement once again.

In "Mamma Mia", Toni uses a spell and potion to create a hallucination where she seduces Sam to get information from him. She is unable to get much before Sam sees through it and Toni resumes her physical torture. As she tortures Sam, Toni gets a call from Mick informing her that Ms. Watt is dead and he has come to bring her in as she's gone too far. Toni refuses to stop and captures Dean when he locates the farmhouse with help from Ms. Watt's cell phone and Castiel. Toni threatens to torture Dean instead but before she can begin, a resurrected Mary Winchester threatens her at gunpoint. Toni and Mary engage in a fight that ends with Toni cutting open her hand and mentally strangling Mary while Dean threatens her with Mary's gun. Toni demands the gun, stating Mary will die if she is killed and Dean pretends to comply. As Dean hands over the gun, he punches Toni unconscious, having recognized that she was using a Chinese mind control technique and that knocking her out would end its effects.

The group is then interrupted by Mick who explains that Toni's orders were to make contact with the Winchesters but she went too far out of her belief of their being a malfeasance in the American hunters. Mick promises that Toni will be punished in London for her actions and departs with her. Toni remains steadfast in her desire to get answers, but Mick refuses though he tells her if necessary, he will do what he has to do to deal with the situation. To that end, he has called for Mr. Ketch, something that leaves Toni visibly uneasy.

In "The Raid", Arthur Ketch has a drink with Dean and tells him that Toni's rogue actions were unforeseen by all but Arthur who "had a sneak peek at what a neurotic, overreaching time bomb she was". Arthur then explains that he and Toni used to date which Dean is not surprised by.

In "Twigs & Twine & Tasha Banes" and "There's Something About Mary", Toni returns to brainwash Mary into being a remorseless killer for the British Men of Letters. Toni succeeds, but is lured into a trap and captured by the Winchesters. Toni informs them of Mick Davies' murder and confirms that her organization is likely responsible for the death of American hunters. At the bunker, the Winchesters are ambushed by Arthur Ketch and three operatives. After killing Arthur's men, a brainwashed Mary forces them to let Arthur go. Arthur then locks the Winchesters in the bunker, initiating a lockdown that cuts off all power, water and air which will result in their suffocation in two to three days. As Toni is a rival for heading the American operation, Arthur locks her in the bunker to die with the Winchesters.

In "Who We Are" Toni claims that she is the only person that can undo Mary's brainwashing to get the Winchesters to spare her. For two days, the Winchesters and Toni work together to find a way out with a magical solution ultimately failing. As the three are on the verge of dying, Dean uses a grenade launcher to blast a hole into the sewers, a plan that Toni feels is insane. Dean then hits the bunker's manual override and save Sam and Toni.

After learning that Jody Mills has captured Mary, the Winchesters demand that Toni break the brainwashing and she finally admits to lying to them about being able to do it. Toni suggests the Winchesters run and watches Sam's rallying speech to the American hunters with apparent interest. Toni agrees to help Dean enter Mary's mind using equipment at the bunker and asks in return that Dean give her a head start before killing Toni so that she can have a chance to see her son one last time. With Toni's help, Dean breaks Mary's brainwashing, but awakens to find that Arthur Ketch has murdered Toni while he was unconscious.

=== Doctor Hess ===
Doctor Hess, portrayed by Gillian Barber, is a British Men of Letters Elder and the Headmistress of the Kendricks Academy.

In 1987, Doctor Hess forced Kendricks student Mick Davies to murder his best friend Timothy as a test of Mick's loyalty to the British Men of Letters code.

In "The British Invasion", Doctor Hess contacts Mick and orders him to "assimilate or eliminate" the American hunters. To ensure Mick's compliance, Doctor Hess sends her lackey Renny Rawlings to watch over him. Following the accidental death of Renny at the hands of Eileen Leahy and the Colt, Doctor Hess personally comes to the British Men of Letters compound, leaving Britain for apparently the first time. After determining that Mick has become too much like the American hunters, Doctor Hess has Arthur Ketch murder him and announces that they will now wipe out the American hunters, particularly the Winchesters.

In "There's Something About Mary" and "Who We Are", Doctor Hess personally coordinates an operation to wipe out the American hunters. She suggests to both Arthur Ketch and Lady Toni Bevell that once it is over, she will place each of them in charge.

As her operatives prepare to strike against the hunters, their families and any bystanders, an assault team of American hunters led by Sam Winchester attacks the British compound. Despite being heavily outnumbered and outgunned, the American hunters slaughter the British operatives, taking some casualties of their own. Desperate, Doctor Hess kills a hunter and retreats to the control room to call for extraction, but the people in Britain can't get her out. She is then confronted at gunpoint by Sam, Jody Mills and another hunter named Walt. Doctor Hess attempts to convince Sam that they still need each other as Lucifer has escaped and Crowley is dead. After a moment of consideration, Sam refuses Doctor Hess' offer and pointedly destroys the computer she was using to communicate with Britain. Enraged, Doctor Hess attempts to shoot Sam only to be shot through the head herself by Jody Mills. The American hunters then destroy the British compound, ending their operation and threat in America.

In "All Along the Watchtower", Sam shares the intelligence Doctor Hess gave him on Lucifer with Dean and Mary. Sam is shown to believe Doctor Hess' claims as he recognizes Lucifer's vessel from the surveillance pictures Doctor Hess shared with him.

=== Victor Henriksen ===
Victor Henriksen, played by Charles Malik Whitfield, was an FBI agent who pursued the Winchesters since the bank "robbery" in the season two episode "Nightshifter". He believed the Winchesters were serial killers responsible for the deaths that have occurred in various towns. He continued to pursue them when, in the season three episode "Jus in Bello", he finally captured them and held them in a small town jail while waiting for an FBI helicopter to arrive. However, demons arrived and destroyed the helicopter; one of them possessed Henriksen but was exorcised. Finally believing in the supernatural, he agreed to help the Winchesters as they fought off the demon horde. Afterwards, he agreed to tell the FBI that they were in the helicopter when it crashed. However, after the Winchesters left, he was killed by Lilith. Henriksen made another appearance in season four's "Are You There, God? It's Me...Dean Winchester". Lilith was breaking the 66 Seals to free Lucifer, and one of them was the Rising of the Witnesses. Sam, Dean, and Bobby met the ghosts of people they could not save, including Henriksen, who told them what happened after they left the jail at the end of "Jus in Bello". The ghosts terrorized the trio until they were put to rest.

== Other supernatural beings ==
=== Chuck Shurley / God ===
Chuck Shurley, also known by the pseudonym Carver Edlund and portrayed by Rob Benedict, is an author of a marginalized book series Supernatural, which recounts everything the Winchester brothers have experienced during the show's run. After confronting him about his seemingly omniscient knowledge of their escapades, it is revealed that he is a Prophet of the Lord, and his works will become new gospels. Between the fourth-season finale "Lucifer Rising" and the fifth-season premiere "Sympathy for the Devil", he witnesses the death of Castiel at the hands of the archangel Raphael. Being the author of the Supernatural series, he attends the first Supernatural convention Sam and Dean were tricked into attending. When it turns out the hotel is actually haunted, he is forced to occupy the guests and the hotel staff while the Winchesters and a pair of cosplayers destroy the ghosts. When the hotel manager leaves and breaks the salt line, he dissipates the ghost with an iron post, unintentionally gaining the affections of Becky.

In "Swan Song", Chuck is periodically narrating about the history of the Impala, his script having the same name as the episode. He informs Dean of the final battlefield between Michael and Lucifer, despite the angels wishing him not to know. At its conclusion, while ending the narration, Chuck smiles and disappears into thin air, leading some to question whether he is merely a prophet that is no longer needed or is actually God. Castiel later states that while he doesn't know what happened to Chuck, he must be dead as a new Prophet was chosen in the form of Kevin Tran and that only happens when the old Prophet dies.

In the Season 10 episode "Fan Fiction" Chuck is shown to be alive as he reappears at the end of a play based on his books and comments that it was "not bad" when asked his opinion by the play's writer, Marie.

In the Season 11 episode "Don't Call Me Shurley", Metatron is transported to a bar that he recognizes as one of God's constructs where he meets with Chuck. After Metatron criticizes his writing, Chuck reveals to the shocked Metatron that he is in fact God, having taken on the form of Chuck Shurley to have a more hands-on role. God explains that after the Apocalypse was averted, He traveled the world but has grown tired of everything and intends to let Amara destroy the world while He works on His autobiography with Metatron's help. God gives Metatron several insights into His actions, confirming He resurrected Castiel several times to aid the Winchesters and revealing he "turned off" Dean's amulet's ability to detect him. He also shows sympathy for Lucifer, stating that Lucifer is not a villain. God is generally apathetic to what's going on on Earth, but Metatron gives Him an impassioned speech about how humanity is better than Him because for all their flaws, they still try. After finishing his autobiography, God has Metatron read it while he plays "Dink's Song" on his guitar. On Earth, God stops Amara's insanity infection and resurrects those who died because of it. After finding Dean's old amulet glowing in Sam's pocket, the brothers follow it to the middle of the street where God, in the form of Chuck, is helping those affected by Amara. The Winchesters are shocked to realize that Chuck was God the whole time and God tells them they should talk.

In "All in the Family", God proves who he is by transporting the Winchesters to the bunker and calling upon the spirit of Kevin Tran to confirm his story. The Winchesters then learn from Metatron that God intends to sacrifice himself to the Darkness to save the universe rather than fight her. After the Winchesters rescue Lucifer, God greets his rebellious son for the first time in millennia and heals his numerous injuries from Amara's torture. In "We Happy Few" there is great tension between God and Lucifer, but the Winchesters get them to have a sit-down in which God admits Lucifer was always his favorite and he feels he failed him by giving him the Mark. Lucifer and God reconcile and gather the witches, angels and demons to aid them in battling Amara since Raphael was dead, Gabriel was presumed dead, God couldn't bring them back in time, and Michael is insane. Together, they defeat the Darkness and God goes to transfer the Mark to Sam to imprison his sister once more, but the Darkness retaliates, leaving God mortally wounded. In "Alpha and Omega", God reluctantly aids the Winchesters in formulating a plan to kill the Darkness to balance the scales once he's dead. As God grows weaker and the universe dies with him, the Darkness teleports him to her location where Dean has convinced her to find another way. The Darkness admits she was jealous of no longer being everything to God and asks to have her brother back. The siblings reconcile and the Darkness heals the injuries she inflicted upon God, reversing the end of the universe. The two siblings then depart the Earth together for a "family meeting".

Chuck/God later appears in the season 14 finale "Moriah", where he tries to convince the Winchesters that Jack Kline has become too powerful and needs to be stopped. After much persuading, God manages to get the Winchesters on his side. However, As Dean prepares to execute Jack with the Colt, Sam realizes that God is enjoying the scene. The Winchesters and Castiel then discover that their entire lives have been nothing more than stories for Chuck/God's sadistic amusement. When the Winchesters confront him on his manipulations (culminating in Dean telling him to "go to Hell"), God responds by killing Jack himself. As he prepares to leave, Chuck is shot and wounded by Sam, causing him to declare "The end" of their story, unleash the souls of hell and leave.

Weakened by the Colt, Chuck seeks help from Amara in Reno. Amara, however, realizes that Chuck has never changed as a person, and leaves him trapped on earth. Chuck then meets with Becky, and tells her of his "ending" to the story of the Winchesters. When Becky is horrified by his idea, Chuck reveals himself to be God before presumably killing her and her family.

God later traps Sam and Eileen in a casino, whose occupants he murdered. Knowing that Dean and Castiel are working to defeat him, Chuck shows Sam visions of the "future" if they win. In it, Castiel is corrupted by the Mark of Cain, and the Winchesters are eventually turned into monsters and killed by Bobby Singer and Jody Mills. Broken by these visions, Sam does not help his brother and Castiel kill God when they arrive. Chuck then manages to heal himself, before revealing that the visions were actually from other worlds. He then departs, leaving the Winchesters, Castiel, and Eileen in the casino.

God/Chuck later enters a store in another world, where he reveals himself as being a sociopathic narcissist who sees the Winchesters as "toys" that exist for his amusement. He then decides to annihilate all the other universes he created. As the clerk begs for his world to be spared, Chuck tells him that "everything will be alright". Chuck then proceeds to destroy the other earth as well.

Having eliminated the other worlds, God returns to the main world, where he meets with Amara. God explains his view of humans as "boring" creatures who "ruin everything they touch". After much debating, Amara traps her brother in the Winchesters' bunker, having previously agreed to help them defeat him. As Dean brings Jack, who is intended to be a bomb, to the bunker, Sam arrives, revealing that their plan will result in Billie, the current "death", to take Chuck's place. Chuck then reveals that he organized the entire event to pit the brothers against each other. Dean tries to ignore Sam's warnings, going as far as threatening to shoot him, before calming down. Chuck then reveals that the Winchesters intend to kill Amara as well, causing her to give in and let him absorb her and her powers. Infuriated that the Winchesters have again defied him, God declares that he is done with them, and leaves after wounding Jack.

In "Inherit the Earth", the Winchesters discover that God has killed all other life on the planet. In a bid of desperation, they contact him, and offer to kill each other in exchange for Chuck bringing back everything else. Chuck, however, reveals that he has decided to let them suffer in a lifeless world. He later sadistically kills a dog the Winchesters found. God then revives his son Lucifer, and sends him to steal his "deathbook" from the Winchesters. Lucifer, however, is killed by his brother Michael, who has since sided with the Winchesters.

Michael later betrays the Winchesters and summons God in an attempt to become his "favorite" again. God, however, executes Michael for his earlier betrayal. He then reveals to the Winchesters that he now intends to "cancel" their "show" and begins savagely beating them. The Winchesters, despite serious injuries, begin to laugh, much to Chuck's confusion. Jack then ambushes Chuck and drains him of all his power. The Winchesters reveal that Jack has been able to harness the energy from Lucifer, Michael, and now God by watching their fights. Chuck accepts his defeat and prepares to be killed, only for the Winchesters to reveal that they instead have chosen to let him live as a mortal and die forgotten. The Winchesters and Jack then leave a horrified Chuck alone in the woods, though his ultimate fate is left alone.

In The Winchesters, it's revealed that God had created the Akrida as a failsafe in case of his defeat: monsters that threatened to finish what God had started and destroy all of creation, including the Multiverse which Jack had restored following God's defeat. Breaking Jack's rules about no interference, Dean guides alternate reality versions of his parents and their friends to destroy the Akrida, foiling God's plan once and for all. Although God himself doesn't appear in The Winchesters, Rob Benedict makes a cameo appearance as a band member named Tango in one episode.

=== Jack Kline ===
Jack Kline, portrayed by Alexander Calvert, is a Nephilim and the son of Lucifer and Kelly Kline. He is the first and only known Nephilim to be sired by an Archangel. Jack was trained by Sam and Dean Winchester to master his powers. During this time, Jack played a crucial role in the resurrection of Castiel, whom he had chosen as his father figure.

Jack journeyed to Apocalypse World to rescue Mary Winchester and fought against Michael's angel army to protect a human colony. He helped Mary consolidate human survivor groups to form a resistance.

Jack's resistance fought in many conflicts. with Jack frequently turning the tide, gaining him the respect of many leaders. Later, he reunited with Sam, Dean, and Castiel, also meeting Lucifer and Gabriel. Lucifer tempted Jack to join him, playing the victim. Gabriel, Castiel, and the Winchesters reminded Jack of Lucifer's history, although Jack began to believe Lucifer and hoped they could defeat Michael. However, the Winchesters stranded Lucifer during the evacuation of the resistance.

Lucifer later offered to take Jack to the stars on a father-son journey. Jack at first accepted, but after discovering that Lucifer agreed with Michael to abandon the earth so that it could be destroyed, Jack disowned him. In retaliation, Lucifer attacked Jack and stole his grace to defeat Michael, then kidnapping Jack and Sam. Lucifer attempted to force Jack and Sam to kill each other, but the pair were rescued by Dean (empowered by Alternate Michael).

After Lucifer's death, Jack struggled with life as a human; taking lessons on hunting and magic from the humans and Castiel, secretly hiding an illness that stems from his lack of grace and his body attacking itself. Succumbing to his illness, he ascends to Heaven where he meets his mother for the first time. He is pursued by the Empty's ruler Shadow who attempts to bring him to his domain. Castiel intervenes and Jack is resurrected with Enochian magic. Confronting Michael, he taps into the power of his soul and kills Michael, absorbing the Archangel's grace to regain his Nephilim powers. However, he burned off much of his soul in the process. It Is eventually revealed that Jack had sacrificed his entire soul to kill Michael, becoming completely soulless.

In "Moriah", God provides the Winchesters with a gun that can kill Jack, though it will also kill the shooter—ostensibly due to the danger Jack poses. Enraged at the loss of his mother, Dean confronts Jack in a cemetery where he has been meeting Castiel. Rather than fight, Jack accepts that losing his soul had made him a monster and orders Dean to kill him. However, Dean cannot bring himself to act, enraging God, who appeared before them. God wanted Jack dead at Dean's hands because for Jack's father to kill Jack would make add to his story. Dean rejects God's offer to resurrect Mary, knowing that Mary would not object. The Winchesters and Castiel turn against God, leading God to smite Jack with a snap of his fingers and begin the end of the world. As the souls of Hell rise, Jack awakens in the Empty where he is greeted by Shadow and Billie. Jack's corpse was used as a vessel by the demon Belphegor to help the Winchesters after he escapes from Hell. However, Castiel smote Belphegor after learning that the demon intended to use the Winchesters to gain power for himself. This second smiting burnt Jack's corpse into a charred skeleton which was apparently left on the floor of Lilith's Chamber in Hell when Castiel had to climb out before the rupture between Earth and Hell closed.

In the Season 15 episode "The Trap", Jack is revealed to still be awake in the Empty. As he looks around the realm, Billie appears to tell Jack that "it's time".

In "The Gamblers", a resurrected Jack is discovered by Castiel to be hunting Grigori, fallen angels who feed on innocents' souls. After killing the Grigori, Jack eats their hearts to grow stronger, but refuses to use his powers as it will draw God's attention to him and reveal his resurrection. Castiel rescues Jack from the last of the Grigori and Jack reunites with his family. Jack explains that Billie had hidden him in the Empty until God left Earth, at which point it was safe for Billie to resurrect him. Billie provided Jack with a plan that will allow Jack to become strong enough to kill God.

In "Galaxy Brain", Jack is revealed to still be soulless, worrying the Winchesters. After learning that Kaia is alive and trapped in the Bad Place from Dark Kaia, the Winchesters attempt to find a way back without Jack's powers. Jack views Kaia through Dark Kaia's mind and decides to risk helping his friend. With the reluctant help of reaper Merle, assigned by Billie to watch over Jack, the Winchesters and Castiel temporarily hide Jack's use of powers from God, allowing him to open a rift to the Bad Place. After Kaia's rescue, Billie kills Merle for failing to keep Jack in line and explains that everyone has a book in Death's library detailing their fate, even God. The book describing God's ultimate destruction mentions Jack, Sam and Dean, though Billie refuses to elaborate further.

In "Destiny's Child", the Winchesters discuss the ramifications of Jack killing God and consider having him kill the Darkness as well to maintain the balance. After encountering an alternate Sam and Dean, Billie arrives to warn that God is almost done destroying alternate universes and will soon return to their world. Billie presents another quest for Jack, stating that the first was to strengthen his body, while the second is more spiritual. Billie instructs them to find the Occultum, though she does not know where it is and refuses to explain its purpose. While the Winchesters talk to Anael, Jack speaks with Castiel about his soul and how he cannot feel emotion, which bothers him. Jack questions whether Dean will ever forgive him. Castiel advises patience. Castiel has Jack drain most of his life force so that Castiel can travel into the Empty and question Ruby. Jack reluctantly complies, but brings Castiel back on Sam and Dean's orders. Having learned the Occultum's location, Castiel leads the others to a church guarded by hellhounds where they uncover a small orb. Swallowing the orb, Jack is transported to the Garden of Eden where he is confronted by a mysterious young girl and Snake. Snake asks who Jack is and who he is meant to be, leading Jack to experience flashes of his life and collapse in tears. Jack returns to the church and kills the hellhounds. Sam and Dean later find him in the bunker's kitchen, crying with remorse and horror over killing Mary. Castiel reveals that the Occultum restored Jack's lost soul.

During "Last Holiday" and "Gimme Shelter", Jack deals with the return of his soul and helps the Winchesters without using his powers. He also confided in Castiel that the plan to defeat God requires him to becomes a supernova that will destroy God and Amara.

In "Unity", team Free Will was able to recruit Amara and make a plan to defeat God, who has destroyed the multiverse. Jack meets Amara, his great-aunt.

In "Inherit The Earth", Jack and Sam reunite with Dean who informs them that God had eradicated humanity and that both Castiel and Bobby were in the Empty. God allowed them to survive, so they could live out their lives, albeit alone. As they bemoan their fate, Jack is revealed to have suffered aftereffects of the explosion, as wither and die after he walked past them. The group discovers Michael is alive and enlists his aid but he is unable to read God's death book. Jack is horrified to be reunited with his resurrected father who kidnaps a reaper to have her take Billie's place to find a way to defeat God, but this is revealed to be a ploy as Lucifer kills the reaper and is on God's side. He tries to recruit Jack but before he can answer, Michael kills Lucifer. The group soon hatch a plan and confront God, though Michael betrays them and is then killed by God. When God decided to personally end the Winchesters, they attack but are left bloodied. The Winchesters then reveal Jack, who is unaffected by God's attempt to smite him. Jack grabs his grandfather, stripping him of his powers. After they are healed, Sam and Dean explain that after Jack exploded in the Empty, he became a power vacuum. The brothers notice the flower's lifeforce being absorbed. The battles between Lucifer and Michael restore Jack's powers and they hatch a plan to fool Michael into betraying them and allowing themselves to get beat on, so that God would expose Jack to his powers, explaining his immunity. Chuck applauds their efforts and expects death, though team Free Will decide that a more fitting punishment for him is to live a mortal life, eventually aging and dying whilst forgotten by humanity. Jack confirms that Chuck will never reacquire his divine powers, ending his threat. Once in town, Jack restores all who were erased by Chuck, while making sure they don't recall their deaths. Jack then leaves the Winchesters explaining that he and Amara are in sync and his powers allow him to be everywhere. He decides not to be hands-on like his grandfather and that as the new God he will live up to the examples that his family (the Winchesters, Castiel, and his mother) taught him.

During "Carry On", Bobby Singer reveals to Dean in Heaven that Jack had become the new Ruler of Heaven, released Bobby, and tore down its walls, allowing souls to freely interact without reliving past memories. It is also revealed that Jack has resurrected Castiel from the Empty in order to help reshape heaven. It is mentioned that Jack was not present at the moment, but Bobby remarks Jack made Heaven the way it should be.

In the series finale, Jack appears in the Monster Club's universe with Singer to admonish Dean for breaking Jack's rule on direct interference. It is revealed that Jack had restored the Multiverse. However, Dean points out that the Akrida (Chuck's failsafe) were a threat to their world as well as Sam. With Bobby backing Dean, Jack acknowledges that another case always appears for hunters, even after death, and he allows Dean to finish his work by returning Dean's journal and Colt to him. This allows Dean to pass on the journal and weapon to John and Mary, so they can avoid the Apocalypse to live a peaceful life and better prepare for supernatural. After Dean says goodbye to his parents, Jack vanishes with Dean, Bobby and the Impala in a flash of light.

=== The Darkness ===
The Darkness, often called by her other name Amara, and portrayed primarily by Emily Swallow, is a supremely powerful primordial entity who has existed since before the beginning of time, along with her twin brother God. She is described as the darkness that existed before Creation. God created the Archangels to fight a terrible war against her. Through the combined power of God and the Archangels, God sealed her away, not wanting to kill her, by using the Mark of Cain as both a lock and key. God revealed that he chose not to kill her in her weakened state as they both needed to be alive because light cannot exist without darkness, and killing Amara would disrupt the balance that reality is founded upon, destroying it. The Archangels battled her and thus knew of her existence, but she is so ancient and mysterious that the Demons and the Angels, besides the Archangels and Metatron, God's scribe, did not believe she existed. During the eleventh season, she escapes her prison to get revenge on her brother, but she and God reconcile by the end of the season.

In season 15, Amara returns, enjoying a peaceful life on Earth and wanting nothing to do with her brother and his plans to destroy everything. The Winchesters discover that to kill Chuck, they must also kill Amara to avoid the universe coming to an end. After learning that Dean has betrayed her, Amara allows Chuck to absorb her so that they can once again become one. However, she is still alive somewhere within Chuck. After Jack absorbs Chuck's power and becomes the new God, he tells the Winchesters that he and Amara exist in harmony.

=== Death ===
Death, portrayed by Julian Richings, is an immensely powerful entity also called The Grim Reaper or the Pale Horseman. He is neither demon nor angel, and states he is "as old as God."

In the climax of "Abandon All Hope", Lucifer performs a bloody ritual to raise Death, and to bind him to Lucifer's apocalyptic bidding. In "Dead Men Don't Wear Plaid", Death goes to Bobby's hometown of Sioux Falls and resurrects many deceased locals as undead; this includes Bobby's wife. The revived at first appear and act normal, but soon take on feral states; this forces others to kill them in self-preservation. These events were an attempt to break Bobby, one of the few remaining influences keeping Sam from agreeing to be Lucifer's vessel. In "The Devil You Know", Bobby temporarily sells his soul to Crowley to locate Death. In "Two Minutes to Midnight" — Death's first corporeal appearance — Death arrives in Chicago to precipitate a storm which would kill three million. His vehicle is a pale white 1959 Cadillac. In a lengthy conversation with Dean, he reveals that this and other actions is the influence of Lucifer's binding spell, which Death wishes to break. He presents Dean with his ring, the final piece allowing the Winchesters to open Lucifer's cage and re-imprison Lucifer. "Two Minutes to Midnight" also introduces Death's taste for the typical, renowned, and often unhealthy local restaurant foods of the places he visits, which becomes something of a running gag.

Death appears again in "Appointment in Samarra", in which Dean attempts to convince him to retrieve Sam's soul from Lucifer's cage. Death agrees to do so if Dean performs Death's duties for an uninterrupted 24 hours. Although Dean fails, the Horseman still restores Sam's soul, regarding the Winchesters as "useful". He also forms a wall between Sam's active consciousness and the debilitating memories of his time in Lucifer's cage.

In season seven when Castiel proclaims himself God, the Winchesters summon and bind Death as part of a plan to stop Castiel; Death takes an instant dislike to him. He informs the angel that he is not God and that he is harboring something else within him, the Leviathans, that will soon break free. Castiel removes the Winchesters' bind and leaves. Death, of his own free will, creates another eclipse, giving the Winchesters and Castiel a chance to return the souls to Purgatory before they destroy his vessel. Castiel succeeds in sending the souls back, but the Leviathans manage to hold on and escape into the world.

In "I Think I'm Gonna Like It Here", when Sam is dying, Death comes to reap him personally, intimating that he considers it an honor. He also states that, though he usually does not pass judgment, he finds all Sam's actions "well-played". Sam requests, and Death agrees, to make it so that Sam dies permanently, such that no one and nothing can bring him back to life. Ezekiel, in Dean's form, interrupts them, however, and Death allows them to talk, saying that it is Sam's choice if he lives or dies. Sam chooses to live, ultimately, and Ezekiel possesses him to heal the damage the trials inflicted.

In "Brother's Keeper", Dean summons Death to kill him as he feels the Mark of Cain is corrupting him too much and he cannot fight it anymore. Death is unable to kill Dean because of the Mark's power and explains that the Mark was created to lock away an evil primordial entity known as the Darkness after God and the Archangels defeated it in a terrible war and that transferring the Mark to someone else is necessary to keep the Darkness bound. When Dean refuses to do this, he offers to transport Dean so far away he is no threat to anyone. However, he demands Sam's death in return as he fears Sam will try to rescue Dean and will not give up until he succeeds. Believing it to be for the greater good, Dean agrees and calls Sam to their location. Death tells Sam his reasons for wanting him dead, including Sam escaping him earlier. Death watches as Sam and Dean argue and fight and then Sam agrees to sacrifice himself to stop the threat of the Mark and the Darkness. Death gives Dean his scythe to do the job and tells him that if Dean does not kill Sam, he will. However, after being reminded of how good he really is and his love for his family, Dean instead impales Death with the scythe, killing him. Death can only stare at Dean in shock before crumbling to ash, leaving Dean stunned that he actually killed Death.

In "Out of the Darkness, Into the Fire", while talking with the Darkness, Dean mentions having learned about her from Death. The Darkness is confused by his statement, telling Dean that she does not know Death and he does not know her.

In "Form and Void", a Reaper named Billie confirms to Sam that Dean did kill Death. Billie states that while Death was amused by the Winchesters' cycle of death and resurrection, there is now a single rule: "what lives, dies". As a result, when the Winchesters eventually die, Billie will toss them into "the Empty" where nothing ever returns from to ensure they will remain dead.

In "Advanced Thanatology", Billie appears as the new Death. Billie reveals that one of the rules of the Universe is that when one incarnation of Death dies, it is replaced by the next Reaper who dies first. Having been killed by Castiel in "First Blood", Billie is now the new Death with her own ring and scythe and a new perspective on life and death. Billie continues this role until "Despair" when she is killed. Billie is briefly replaced as the new Death by Betty before Betty is killed by Lucifer.

=== Eve ===
Eve, portrayed by Julia Maxwell and Samantha Smith, is also known as the "Mother of All". Eve was last on Earth 10,000 years ago. She is the original propagator of the majority of supernatural beings. She has been trapped in Purgatory, where the souls of the supernatural go. Eve is released from Purgatory in "Like a Virgin" by a sacrificial ritual. In "...And Then There Were None", Eve creates a being - referred to colloquially as the Khan Worm - that can enter a person's body through the ear and control their actions. She plants it inside a trucker, who goes on to kill his family. It then passes to one of his co-workers who kills 12 people. While investigating the murders, it infects Dean who kills his cousin Gwen, and then infects Samuel, and finally Bobby who kills Rufus while possessed. While possessing Bobby, it tells Dean and Sam that it was created by Eve, who intends for supernatural beings to take over the world. After acquiring the ashes of a Phoenix, said to be lethal to Eve, Sam, Dean, Bobby and Castiel take the fight to her in "Mommy Dearest". Eve reveals that her actions are purely a response to Crowley, still alive, and his capture and torture of her children. She speculates that he is after the souls in Purgatory, and claims that she was satisfied with the natural order of humans and monsters coexisting (with occasional bloodshed on both sides) until Crowley forced her hand. Eve dies after biting Dean, who had Phoenix ash in his blood, to which Crowley takes her body for autopsy. In "There Will Be Blood!", when the Leviathan Edgar is very dismissive towards the Alpha Vampire, he calls himself a "son of Eve", but Edgar calls the Alpha a "mutt" and Eve was "barely worth being called one of us". When Edgar calls Eve a whore, the Alpha Vampire is enraged and attacks him. Though Eve does not appear herself, when Dean and Castiel return to Purgatory to seek out a 'Leviathan Blossom' for a spell to be used against God, Eve sends some Leviathans after them to capture Castiel, still angered at his role in taking the souls of Purgatory. However, Cas escapes with one of the Blossoms before he can be brought to her.

=== Pestilence ===
Pestilence, portrayed by Matt Frewer, is one of the Four Horsemen of the Apocalypse, along with War, Famine and Death. He wears an emerald-embedded ring. He can create and manipulate infestations, plagues, diseases, and other sicknesses.

Upon Lucifer's rise, Pestilence spreads Swine Flu on Earth. It is later revealed that the flu was spread to distribute the Croatoan Virus in the form of a 'vaccine'. Dean witnesses the effects of this when transported to the future by Zachariah - approximately 90% of the planet's population is infected. When the Winchesters track Pestilence, he is revealed to be vengeful for the defeat of War and Famine. Castiel defeats the Horseman by removing his ring and, with assistance from Crowley, the spread of the Croatoan Virus is prevented. The eventual fate of Pestilence is unknown, but it can be assumed that he survived his defeat, albeit much weakened.

=== The Shadow ===
The Shadow, portrayed by Misha Collins, Erica Cerra and Rachel Miner, is the mysterious and powerful being inhabiting the Empty. Called the Shadow by Naomi, it is also referred to as a cosmic entity and the Empty itself by various characters.

In season 13's "The Big Empty", the Shadow is awoken when Castiel unexpectedly wakes up in the Empty. Taking on the form of Castiel himself but with a more sinister voice, the Shadow explains that it and the Empty predate everything and that not even God has power in its realm. It attempts to torment and threaten Castiel into compliance, but he continually refuses and demands that it resurrect him instead. After Castiel threatens to keep it awake for eternity until they both go insane, the Shadow reluctantly resurrects the angel. In "Tombstone", Castiel briefly mentions annoying "an ancient cosmic being" into sending him back to life, but subsequently attributes his resurrection to Jack.

In season 14's "Byzantium", the Shadow invades Heaven in search of Jack after the young Nephilim dies, feeling that he belongs in the Empty due to his half angel nature. The Shadow demonstrates its immense power by effortlessly blasting into Heaven, blowing open even the gates permanently sealed by Metatron years earlier and consuming the remaining angels. Secretly possessing the angel Dumah, the Shadow accompanies Castiel to Jack in Kelly Kline's Heaven where it reveals itself and attempts to take Jack with it. Receiving a prayer from Dean that they are ready to resurrect Jack, Castiel offers to trade himself for Jack to the Shadow, pointing out that it could be waiting eons for him otherwise. The Shadow accepts the deal, but warns that it will come to collect when Castiel is truly happy. The Shadow departs Dumah and Heaven and returns to the Empty, restoring all of the angels to normal.

In "Moriah", after being killed by God, Jack awakens in the Empty where he is greeted by the Shadow in its viscous humanoid form. The Shadow forms a smile on its face and appears to laugh at the confused Jack before Billie appears to tell Jack that they need to talk.

In season 15's "Destiny's Child", the Shadow takes on the form of Meg Masters when Castiel returns to the Empty in search of Ruby. Imitating many of the demon's mannerisms, the Shadow greets Castiel with Meg's trademark "Hello, Clarence", but is unable to collect on their deal as Castiel is not truly happy and it is working with Billie to stop God, having allowed Billie to resurrect Jack. Though annoyed, the Shadow reluctantly allows Castiel to converse with Ruby to find out the location of the Occultum. When Castiel prepares to leave, the Shadow explains that Billie has promised to send it back to sleep in exchange for the Shadow's help, something that the entity has been unable to do on its own since Castiel and Jack inadvertently woke it up two years before. Though the Shadow can't collect on their deal yet, it enjoys torturing Castiel while he is still within its power. After Jack takes Castiel out of the Empty, the amused Shadow simply comments that it will see him soon.

In "Unity", the Shadow, still in the form of Meg, is discovered by Sam inside of Death's Library searching for Billie. The Shadow explains that Castiel's visit to the Empty caused the being to doubt Billie's trustworthiness. To Sam's shock and horror, the Shadow reveals that Billie's true plan is to take power as the new God once Jack kills Amara and Chuck, leaving a power vacuum. For its help, Billie has promised to help the Shadow return to its slumber. Though the Shadow has located Chuck's book in the library, only Billie can read it. Sam convinces the Shadow that he is working for Billie and the being reluctantly turns the book over to him. During this time, its revealed that the Shadow can't come to Earth unless it is directly summoned there due to precautions put into place by Chuck.

In "Despair", to contain Jack's detonation, Billie teleports him into the Empty where he encounters the Shadow, still using Meg's form. The being is at first amused by his appearance until Jack explodes, engulfing them both. Both Jack and the Shadow survive, but after the being reforms, it is noticeably horrified and tells Jack that he made the usually silent Empty "loud", indicating that something has gone terribly wrong. At the same time, Billie confirms that the Shadow was telling the truth about her plans and that she really did lie to and manipulate the being. However, she feels safe on Earth as the Shadow can't come unless it is directly summoned. Billie eventually rescues Jack from the Empty after Sam returns Chuck's Death book, angering the Shadow who was causing Jack intense pain at the time. After being mortally wounded with her own scythe by Dean, Billie returns to her library which she has warded against the Shadow as a precaution. Later, Castiel realizes that the only way to stop Billie is to complete his deal with the Shadow which will summon it to take him. Castiel reveals his deal with the Shadow to Dean and completes it by confessing his love for Dean. The Shadow immediately opens a portal into the Empty in the bunker's dungeon and sends through two tendrils of darkness which absorb Castiel and Billie and pull them into the Empty.

In "Carry On", Bobby Singer reveals that Jack resurrected Castiel from the Empty again, freeing Castiel from the Shadow's clutches.

== Creatures ==
=== Deities ===
Deities are god-like beings of different cultures that are also known as pagan gods. The deities were powerful beings many years ago, gaining power from their human followers as well as from human sacrifices. Due to the arrival of the Abrahamic religions, many deities were weakened, resulting in them having to take human sacrifices themselves. Many deities act on their own accord, gathering power or human sacrifices for themselves.

In season one, Sam and Dean encounter the Vanir (performed by Mike Carpenter) in the episode "Scarecrow" where one of them appears as a scarecrow.

In season three, Sam and Dean encounter Madge and Edward Carrigan (portrayed by Merrilyn Gann and Spencer Garrett) in "A Very Supernatural Christmas" where they are pagan gods of the winter solstice from an unspecified culture.

In season five, Sam and Dean encounter a Leshi in "Fallen Idols" who assumes the form of Abraham Lincoln (portrayed by David Livingston), Mahatma Gandhi (portrayed by Paul Statman), and Paris Hilton. The episode "Hammer of the Gods" features the pagan gods Kali (portrayed by Rekha Sharma), Baldur (portrayed by Adam Croasdell), Mercury (portrayed by John Emmet Tracy), Odin (portrayed by Duncan Fraser), Ganesha (portrayed by Keith Dallas), Baron Samedi (portrayed by Precious Silburne), Zao Shen (portrayed by King Lau), Isis, and two unnamed pagan gods who hold a meeting at the Elysium Motel which they create while making a meal out of any human who checks in. Mercury poses as the desk clerk who does most of the creation of the Elysium Hotel, Isis poses as a waitress, and Zhao Shen is implied to work as the hotel chef due to him mostly being in the kitchen. Their meeting is to discuss what to do about the threat of Lucifer and the approaching apocalypse. Gabriel infiltrates the meeting passing himself off as Loki up to the point where Kali remembers him. Sam and Dean warn them that Lucifer will overwhelm them. The pagan gods are persuaded to release the remaining humans. When Lucifer arrives at the Elysium Motel upon being summoned by Mercury, he kills Mercury and the pagan gods until only Kali remains. She is evacuated by Sam and Dean while Gabriel fights Lucifer.

In season six, Sam and Dean encounter Veritas (portrayed by Serinda Swan) in "You Can't Handle the Truth."

In season seven, Sam and Dean encounter Osiris (portrayed by Faran Tahir) in "Defending Your Life." In "Time After Time", Sam and Dean encounter Chronos (portrayed by Jason Dohring).

In season eight, Sam and Dean encounter Plutus (portrayed by Gerard Plunkett) and Vili (portrayed by Alex Daikun) in "What's Up, Tiger Mommy?" while Plutus' assistant Beau (portrayed by Jonathan Walker) was exclusive to this show. The episode "Remember the Titans" had Sam and Dean encountering Zeus (portrayed by John Novak) and Artemis (portrayed by Anna Van Hooft) who were hunting Prometheus.

In season nine, Sam and Dean encounter Vesta (portrayed by Lindy Booth) in "Rock and a Hard Place."

In season ten, Sam and Dean encounter Calliope (portrayed by Hannah Levien) in "Fan Fiction" where she was interfering with a play adapted from Chuck Shurley's book by manifesting a copy of the Vanir's scarecrow form.

In season twelve, Sam and Dean encounter Moloch (portrayed by John DeSantis) in "The Memory Remains."

In season thirteen, Sam and Dean encounter Yokoth and Glythur in "The Thing" where they came from another reality. Both of them were killed by God. The episode "Unfinished Business" featured the real Loki (portrayed by Richard Speight Jr.) who had a history with Gabriel where he freed Loki from his imprisonment that Odin placed him in. Loki later double-crossed him and then went after Gabriel years later to exact revenge for what Lucifer did to Odin. Gabriel was able to slay Loki.

In season fourteen, Sam and Dean encounter Anubis (portrayed by Sean Amsing) in "Byzantium" who worked in Heaven and heard their tales.

In season fifteen, Sam and Dean encounter Fortuna (portrayed by Lynda Boyd) and her demigod son Pax (portrayed by Stephen Huszar) in "The Gamblers" where they learned the history of the pagan gods from Fortuna. It is revealed that God created the deities so humanity can blame them for his mistakes and that they also can make great stories.

=== Djinn ===
Djinn are a race of monsters appearing in Supernatural. Unlike common lore, they do not actually grant wishes, and instead put their victims into a dream-state where they play out a fantasy in their mind where their wish has come true while the djinn feeds off of them. Other djinn have shown the ability to instead place their victims in a sort of waking nightmare state where they hallucinate their worst fears before being killed. A bastard offshoot exists as well, feeding on fear instead of desire and instead of putting people into states where they imagine their greatest desire, they are put into a nightmare where they experience their worst fear. Both kinds of djinn, the regular djinn and the bastard offshoot can be killed by a silver knife dipped in lamb's blood. Regular djinn poison can be cured using an antidote developed by the Campbell family, but the antidote does not work on the bastard offshoot's poison. This is speculated to be because they are a different kind of djinn and need a different kind of antidote. Another way of saving a person under the influence of djinn poison is to wake them from their dream state which breaks the loop they are in and ends the effects of the poison.

In season 2's "What Is and What Should Never Be", the Winchesters hunt a djinn who apparently grants Dean's wish that his mother never died. As a result, Dean awakens in what is apparently an alternate reality where Mary Winchester is still alive, John Winchester died of natural causes years before, Sam is engaged to Jessica Moore and Dean is somewhat detached from his family though he has a beautiful girlfriend named Carmen Porter. While originally happy, Dean is distressed by his distance from his family and the discovery that the people the Winchesters saved died in the alternate reality without Sam and Dean there to save him. He is also haunted by visions of a young woman he found hanging in the djinn's lair. Dean decides to track down the djinn and reverse his wish, accompanied by a reluctant Sam. Upon arriving at the djinn's lair, Dean comes to the realization that he is not in an alternate reality after all but instead is in dream state while the djinn feeds on him. Despite his imagined family trying to convince him to stop, Dean commits suicide in the dream which awakens him in the real world where Sam finds him. Dean kills the djinn as it tries to put Sam into a similar state and they rescue the young woman, the djinn's other victim, who survives.

In the season 6 premiere "Exile on Main St.", Dean is targeted for revenge by three djinn a year after quitting hunting in revenge for the death of the djinn in "What Is and What Should Never Be" who they identify as their father. Posing as Dean's waitress, one of the djinn, Brigitta, poisons Dean who experiences intense hallucinations, ending with an attack by the long-dead Azazel. Dean is saved by Sam who injects Dean with an antidote. Sam, who Dean was unaware was still alive, explains that he was targeted by the djinn too and was saved by the Campbell family. To draw Dean out, the djinn attack and kill his neighbors then give him a "double dose" of poison, destroying the antidote. Sam manages to bash in the head of one of the male djinn with a golf club while the other is killed from behind by Samuel Campbell with a silver knife dipped in lamb's blood. Brigitta is captured by Samuel and Christian Campbell and taken to Crowley who tortures her for information on the Alpha Djinn. Brigitta is found by the Winchesters, Castiel and Meg Masters in "Caged Heat" where she begs them for help. Brigitta is killed by Castiel when he destroys the monster prison.

In season 8's "Pac-Man Fever", the Winchesters and Charlie Bradbury investigate a case of people who die with their insides turned to jelly and a strange blue handprint on their arm. Dean discovers from John Winchester's journal that the culprit is a bastard offshoot of djinn who are revealed to feed on fear rather than desire. The local coroner, Jennifer O'Brien, is revealed to be a djinn who has been using her job to cover up her murders for years by immediately cremating the bodies. Jennifer kidnaps Charlie and places her into a nightmare state where Charlie has to fight off an endless army of monsters to protect patients in a hospital, particularly her brain dead mother who losing is Charlie's greatest fear. Jennifer is found out by the Winchesters and killed by Dean. Unable to wake Charlie with the djinn antidote, Dean uses African dream root to enter her dream state where he manages to get her to let go of her fear and wake up. At the same time, Sam discovers that the most recent murders were committed by Jennifer's teenage son. Unaware of how to hide his kills and having just come of age, he drew too much attention with his actions. Despite being in a weakened state from the Hell Trials, Sam manages to kill the boy.

In season 9's "Bloodlines", djinn are revealed to be one of the Five Monster Families of Chicago. According to shapeshifter David Lassiter, the djinn control the South Side. A representative of the family meets with werewolf Julian Duval to forge an alliance in preparation for a possible war with the shapeshifter Lassiter family following the murder of family head Sal Lassiter by an insane hunter.

In season 13's "Scoobynatural", Castiel returns to the Men of Letters bunker with fruit from the Tree of Life. Castiel reveals that the Tree was guarded by a pack of djinn, most of whom Castiel killed before negotiating with the rest. Castiel notes that he thinks he is now technically married to the djinn queen.

In season 14's "Nightmare Logic", the Winchesters, their mother, Bobby Singer and another hunter named Maggie encounter a djinn named Neil who has been enhanced by Michael. Michael's enhancements allow Neil to tell a person's worst fears simply by touching them and bring the fears to life around them. Neil puts a home owner named Patrick Rawling into a coma, apparently as the result of a stroke and poses as Patrick's live-in nurse. While investigating the case, Dean recognizes the rig Neil is using to drain the home owner's blood as the same he was hooked up to by a djinn in "What Is and What Should Never Be" and confronts Neil who reveals that he was left as a trap for hunters by Michael while he was possessing Dean, resulting in Neil mistaking Dean for Michael when he arrived. After revealing that Michael has left similar traps all over, Neil attacks Dean who mysteriously proves immune to his powers. Lacking a silver knife dipped in lamb's blood, Dean bashes Neil's head in with a heavy metal bookend, killing him and then fires several more shots into his head, ending Neil's manifestations. As Neil's poison was what was keeping Patrick comatose, he recovers as well once Neil is dead and he is no longer under Neil's influence. Taking Neil's warning to heart, the Winchesters spread the word to other hunters about Michael's traps.

=== Ghosts ===
Ghosts are one of the most recurring monsters of the week on Supernatural, appearing at least once each season.

In the show, there are several different types of ghosts that appear including:

- Death Omens - The Death Omens are an indicator where a person that is visited by it is going to die. They can manifest in different places at once. Isaiah Merchant (portrayed by Linden Banks) from "Provenance" was the first Death Omen that appeared after he was killed by his adoptive daughter Melanie.
- Vengeful Spirits - The ghosts of people who want revenge for a wrong committed to them in life. Mary Worthington (portrayed by Jovanna Burke) from "Bloody Mary" was the first vengeful spirit they encountered where she was originally killed by a surgeon named Trevor Sampson and was based on Bloody Mary.
- Violent Spirits - A type of dangerous ghost motivated by cruelty.
- Women in White - Female ghosts in white clothes that kidnap men and children and are loosely based on La Llorona. Constance Welch (portrayed by Sarah Shahi in the pilot, Shanae Tomasevich in "Moriah" and season 15) is a known Woman in White who drowned her children in a bathtub after finding her husband Joseph cheating on her and committed suicide. She haunted the highways near her home and killed anyone who got close. When Sam and Dean drive the car into the house where she briefly attacks them, Constance is confronted by the ghost of her children and dragged into the afterlife.

During the show, numerous methods are employed to put the various ghosts to rest, but the most commonly used is salting and burning their human remains. Generally when a spirit's remains are salted and burned, they go up in flames. However, sometimes this is not possible due to cremation and they are attached to an object that must be salted and burned as well. Sam and Dean regularly use iron objects and rock salt shotgun pellets to battle ghosts as iron and salt repel them for a while.

In season 7, hunter Bobby Singer became a ghost for a time after his death to look after the Winchesters and help stop the Leviathan threat. When he began turning into a vengeful spirit, the Winchesters were forced to put him to rest.

While it was initially unknown where ghosts go after they are destroyed, hunters generally believed it to be oblivion. However, it is revealed in season 8's "Taxi Driver" that Reapers take the spirit to where they belong once the ghost has been forced from this plane of existence.

In season 9's "Captives" and "Stairway to Heaven", the ghost of Prophet Kevin Tran and the Reaper Tessa reveal that the closing of Heaven has trapped all of the ghosts who since died in the Veil.

This is rectified when Metatron is defeated and Heaven is reopened as seen in season 10's "Angel Heart" where the recently deceased Amelia Novak is reunited with her husband in Heaven. Additionally, the Winchesters are twice shown to convince a ghost to move on rather than forcing them to though they revert to their old method of dealing with ghosts in "Paint it Black." In the first instance in season 9's "Bad Boys", the ghost is attached to her young son rather than an object and the boy convinces her to go on. In the second instance, season 10's "Halt & Catch Fire", the ghost is haunting the Internet and there is no way to destroy him through usual methods. Instead, the man's wife convinces him over FaceTime to move on.

At the end of season 14, God opens every door in Hell and unleashes billions of condemned souls upon the world, some being old enemies of the Winchesters like Constance Welch, Mary Worthington, and John Wayne Gacy.

In the first three episodes of season 15, the Winchesters and their allies attempt to contain Constance Welch, Mary Worthington, John Wayne Gacy, Lizzie Borden's ghost, Francis Tumblety's ghost, and other unnamed Hell Ghosts to Harlan, Kansas where they emerged and find a way to send all of them back to Hell. Using a spell from the demon Belphegor, the Winchesters contain the ghosts for a time, but the barrier begins to fail. Belphegor proposes a plan to use Lilith's Crook, a magical horn created by Lilith, to draw all of the Hell Ghosts back into Hell while Rowena performs a spell to close the rupture. Castiel is forced to kill Belphegor after he betrays them and Rowena sacrifices herself to cast them back into Hell.

=== Leviathans ===
Leviathans were first introduced as another primary "creation" of God in the Season 7 premiere. According to Death, the Leviathans were among God's earliest creations but were sealed in Purgatory because they were a threat to His other creations. Castiel accidentally absorbs them, along with the souls in Purgatory, during his attempted apotheosis, and the Leviathans free themselves. Once free, they organize a hierarchy with the Leviathan possessing the businessman Richard "Dick" Roman as the leader, though Crowley claims that this being has always been their leader.

The Leviathans are portrayed as virtually indestructible, voracious, and stronger than demons and low-level angels. They can shape-shift into humans, but to do so, they must use traces of their DNA. Leviathans not only replicate the corporeal form of a human, but also their memories and skills. They also have the ability to kill angels with brute force alone. Leviathans' weaknesses include magic, borax, and decapitation, though none of these are lethal. One way for a Leviathan to die is for it to be eaten by a Leviathan. Late in season seven, the characters find a tablet containing the "Word of God" that reveals a Leviathan can be killed by using "a bone of a righteous mortal washed in the blood of the three fallen". When this happens, the Leviathan liquefies and explodes.

In season seven, the Leviathans, led by Roman, plan to turn humankind into a farmed, Leviathan food source. They intend to do so through chemically decreasing their intelligence via food adulterants and curing their diseases, including cancer. The Winchesters put a stop to this during the season finale, with Dean and Castiel killing Roman, which, as a side consequence, sends them to Purgatory. Killing Roman, the only Leviathan leader that there has ever been, severely weakens the Leviathans, as they are now directionless. According to Crowley, they will now be regular monsters, albeit ones that are much harder to kill.

==== Dick Roman ====
Dick Roman (played by James Patrick Stuart) is a billionaire businessman whose secret identity is that of the nameless leviathan leader. Shortly after they were unknowingly released by Castiel, the leviathans infiltrated human society, with their leader murdering and impersonating the real Dick Roman. Dick is shown to have a hatred of demons that exceeds even his feelings about humanity, rejecting the demon Crowley's (Mark Sheppard) offer to join forces with him and telling the current leader of Hell that he might wipe his kind from the Earth. In "How to Make Friends and Influence Monsters", Dick visits an experimental facility run by a leviathan impersonation of one Dr. Gaines, disappointed by the newspaper articles stemming from the drugs used, and makes him eat himself. When his henchmen capture Bobby, Dick attempts to stop the Winchesters' rescue attempt, fatally wounding Bobby on their escape. Dick is later revealed to be after something from archaeological digs, and assigns Charlie to break Frank's hard drive. Unknown to him, she cracks it, learns the truth about him and the rest of the Leviathans, and then teams up with the Winchesters to erase the drive and find out his plans. The Winchesters switch the item he was looking for with a Borax bomb that explodes in Dick's face. Realizing that Charlie betrayed him, he orders the building locked down and goes after her, but the Winchesters break in with the help of Bobby's ghost and Bobby holds Dick off long enough for Charlie and the Winchesters to escape. Dick has Edgar kidnap Kevin at the end of "Reading is Fundamental" and threatens Linda to get Kevin to translate the Word of God tablet in "There Will Be Blood". Dick correctly predicts that the Winchester brothers are planning to get the blood of the Alpha Vampire and of Crowley for the leviathan-killing bone described by the tablet; after sending Edgar on an ill-fated mission to kill the Alpha Vampire before the Winchesters can attain the alpha's blood, Dick summons and traps Crowley. Rather than kill the demon, however, Dick makes a deal with Crowley: in exchange for Crowley giving the Winchesters the wrong blood as part of a trap, the demons will get a free rein with humans in the world, excluding America, which is the place where the leviathans are currently targeting for its abundant food source. Foreseeing Crowley's betrayal, Dick also arranges for several decoys of himself positioned in Sucrocorp to fool the Winchesters into wasting the bone on a fake. However, Dean and Castiel ultimately find and confront Dick, whom Castiel is able to identify due to the brief time that the leviathans used him as their host. When the bone seemingly fails to work, Dick initially believes that he has won, only to find out that he himself has been tricked when Dean kills him with the real bone, sending him back to Purgatory. As an unintended consequence of using the bone, however, Dean and Castiel are pulled into Purgatory with him.

==== Edgar ====
Edgar (played by Benito Martinez) is the first Leviathan introduced in the series, taking the form of a demolitions expert and working under orders from "the Leader" - which will be later revealed to be Dick Roman - sent to lead in those feeding indiscriminately and to kill Sam, Dean and Bobby when they interfered on his plans. After observing the new system for feeding developed at Sioux Falls General, he torches Bobby's house and confronts the Winchesters, breaking Dean's leg and knocking Sam unconscious. Dean crushes him with a car from Bobby's scrapyard, but he is later revealed to have been unharmed and continues to pursue the Winchesters and Bobby.

After that, Edgar still worked underground under Dick's order, supervising Sucrocorp project. When the clay tablet that contained the Word of God was stolen by the Winchesters. Dick ordered Edgar to stop them, so he took the form of the detective Collins (played by Eric Floyd) and searched for Kevin Tran, the teenager prophet destined to keep the word. After two Angels return Kevin to his mother's house, Edgar easily kills the two. He later helps Dick force Kevin Tran to translate the Word of God for them and tries to kill the Alpha Vampire. However, Sam decapitates him while he is distracted and as a result of his betrayal, the Alpha gives Sam and Dean his blood for the weapon they are creating. Edgar is left to the Alpha with a warning to keep his head away from the rest of his body.

=== Shapeshifters ===
Shapeshifters are one of the most commonly appearing monsters in Supernatural. While shapeshifter is a somewhat general term, members of the species have also been shown using it when discussing their species with others. In particular, shapeshifter David Lassiter called himself a shapeshifter to Ennis Ross in season 9's "Bloodlines" and proceeded to describe what it meant. Having a human appearance, they are able to shapeshift into whomever they like, living or dead and perfectly mimic their appearance. As seen on a few occasions, unlike most monsters, shapeshifters are not created through a person being turned but are in fact made through sexual reproduction with one shapeshifter parent and one regular human parent. Most shapeshifters shed their skin when changing appearances, but in season 9 a few were able to change form without shedding skin similar to the Alpha Shapeshifter, the very first shapeshifter. They are vulnerable to silver which burns them on contact and kills them when they are stabbed or shot through the heart with it. On camera, their eyes give off a glow referred to as a retinal flare which helps to identify them.

Unlike many monsters, shapeshifters are not hunger-based and instead retain human impulses and desires which they use their powers to act upon. As a result, shapeshifters that are evil consciously choose to be rather than because of some innate impulse. On a few occasions, a shapeshifter has turned out to commit a murder or murders originally attributed to ghosts due to their ability to mimic the dead making it seem like the ghosts of the people they impersonate have come back for revenge. While some shapeshifters simply cycle through different forms and never seem to settle on one particular look, others have been shown to have a preferred appearance that they use as their base form for when they are not impersonating someone. It is never made clear if this chosen base form is simply a preference for the shapeshifter or is in fact what they originally looked like. Shapeshifters do not appear to be able to sense others of their kind as the Winchesters encountered a shapeshifter in season 13 that could not tell that her ex-boyfriend, another shapeshifter, was impersonating one of her patients. She also could not tell which it was once she knew that he was.

A shapeshifter first appears in season 1's "Skin", Sam and Dean's first encounter with one over their entire hunting career. Having taken the form of Sam's college friend Zach, the shapeshifter had framed him for murdering his girlfriend and was targeting couples by taking on the form of one member while they were away and harming their partner. In the form of Dean, the shapeshifter attacked a SWAT team sent to apprehend it, effectively framing him for its crimes. In the end, Dean killed the shapeshifter with silver bullets to the heart as it tried to kill Sam. The Winchesters then used its body, still in Dean's form, to fake his death and exonerating Zach and everyone else the shapeshifter framed at the same time. The shapeshifter's crimes play an important role in the Winchesters' relationship with the law, particularly as Dean becomes wanted for them once he is revealed to still be alive.

=== Vampires ===
Vampires are Supernatural's most common monsters, appearing in every season except season 4. Supernatural's vampires differ greatly from common vampire lore, a fact that is pointed out in their first appearance by John Winchester. In Supernatural, vampires are not affected by crosses or garlic while sunlight hurts, but is not fatal to them. In addition, vampires cannot be killed through a stake to the heart. The primary method of killing a vampire is instead decapitation while dead man's blood—the blood of a dead person—acts as a poison and sedative to them, though it is not fatal in the long run. Their bloodlust is very real and like mythological vampires they are driven to feed on humans. They can reproduce by feeding a human their blood or directly introducing it to the person's bloodstream. According to Dean Winchester, the time it takes a person to turn depends on that particular person: sometimes it can be fast and sometimes it can be slower.

Unlike most monster species, vampires can occasionally be cured and reverted to their original human state. This cure requires the blood of the sire vampire and for the new vampire to have not drank even a single drop of blood or the cure is ineffective. As mentioned in season 13's "Breakdown", two other ingredients are garlic and sage. The cure is mentioned to make the recipient sick for a few days after it is taken. It was developed by the Campbell family of hunters at some point in the past and is referred to as "an old family recipe" by Samuel Campbell. After learning of the cure when its used on Dean, the Winchesters put it to use occasionally to save recently turned vampires who have not yet fed. While other hunters are generally unaware of the cure's existence or how to make it, the Winchesters have shared it with a few others while using it during hunts. However, use of the cure is rare as the requirements, specifically the need for the vampire not to have fed yet on even a single drop of blood, make it rare that a situation is encountered where using the cure is an option.

Vampires first appear in season 1's "Dead Man's Blood" where a group led by Kate (portrayed by Anne Openshaw) and Luther (portrayed by Warren Christie) attack and kill hunter Daniel Elkins and steal from him a legendary gun known as The Colt which is rumored to be able to kill anything. Elkins' murder draws the attention of the Winchesters and their father who was a friend of Elkins and had never told his sons about vampires as he had believed the species to be extinct. John leads his sons on a pursuit of Elkins' killers as he sees The Colt as their only way of killing Azazel. Sam and Dean rescue the vampires' human victims and disobey orders to come to their father's rescue during an ambush. John uses The Colt to kill the vampire leader Luther, proving the legendary gun's power while two vampires manage to escape.

In season 2's "Bloodlust", Sam and Dean encounter a nest of vegetarian vampires that feed only on animals and consist of Lenore (portrayed by Amber Benson), Eli (portrayed by Ty Olsson), Conrad, and Christina Flanagan (portrayed by Janeane Carltone). This nest is being hunted by ruthless hunter Gordon Walker who wants to exterminate the entire species due to his sister getting turned. Though Dean originally sides with Gordon, he changes his mind upon seeing Lenore resist her cravings for human blood. Instead, the Winchesters help the vampires to escape and make an enemy of Gordon in the process. Lenore later returns in season 6's "Mommy Dearest" where she reveals that the influence of the Mother of All Monsters Eve caused her nest to return to feeding on humans. After giving the hunters Eve's location, Lenore is killed by Castiel at her own request.

In season 3's "Fresh Blood", the Winchesters come up against a vampire named Dixon (portrayed by Matthew Humphreys) who is trying to create a new nest following the extermination of his old one by hunters and the loss of his daughter. At the same time, vampire hunter Gordon Walker attacks in hopes of killing Sam and is caught by Dixon who changes Gordon into a vampire. By the time the Winchesters track Dixon down, Gordon has killed his "new daughters" and escaped and a depressed Dixon asks to be killed. Using his new powers, Gordon tries to kill Sam, changing a young woman into a vampire as part of a trap. Dean kills the young woman with The Colt while Sam manages to decapitate Gordon with razor wire.

==== Benny Lafitte ====
Benjamin "Benny" Lafitte (Ty Olsson) is a vampire who was a vampire pirate during his first lifetime until he met Andrea Kormos and fell in love with her, leaving his nest and stopping feeding on humans. He was eventually tracked down and killed by his nest mates and went to Purgatory where he spent around fifty years before Dean ended up there after killing Dick Roman. Benny saves Dean from another vampire and makes a deal with him: in exchange for Dean taking him with him, Benny will show him a portal out of Purgatory. Benny helps Dean find Castiel, warning him that traveling with an angel will get them killed, but Dean is insistent on all of them getting out. After Benny saves Castiel from Leviathans, he earns Dean's full trust and Dean carries him out of Purgatory in his arm. On Earth, Dean travels to Benny's grave and resurrects him. The two remain in touch but stay separate until Benny goes after his nest for revenge and to protect himself from further attempts on his life. After Benny is injured, he calls Dean for help and together they take down the nest, with Benny killing his maker. However, Benny is reunited with Andrea who he learns was turned into a vampire instead of being killed. She helps him out, but to Benny's heartbreak, he learns that she has changed and wants to take over the pirating operation herself and Dean is forced to kill her to save Benny. Needing something to keep him on the straight and narrow, Benny moves to his hometown of Carencro, Louisiana where he meets and secretly looks out for his great-granddaughter Elizabeth. Rogue vampire Desmond tries to get Benny to join him, but Benny refuses and Desmond leaves a trail of bodies to try to get Benny to agree, drawing the attention of insane hunter Martin Creaser and Sam and Dean. Dean and Benny hunt down and kill Desmond, but Martin tries to kill Benny, using Elizabeth as a hostage. Benny is forced to kill him in self-defense and is left in a deteriorating situation worsened by the fact that Dean soon afterwards cuts off all contact. When Sam gets trapped in Purgatory, Dean goes to Benny for help, knowing he can get Sam out. Benny agrees, telling Dean he feels he no longer fits in on Earth. Dean kills Benny who saves Sam and Bobby Singer from vampires and leads them to the portal out. However Benny, who never intended to return to Earth, stays behind to hold off a group of vampires and allow Sam to escape. Benny is last seen fighting the vampires. Benny finally gains Sam's acceptance with this self-sacrifice and Dean buries his body instead of burning it in hopes of bringing him back one day.

==== The Alpha Vampire ====
The Alpha Vampire, portrayed by Rick Worthy is the first member of the vampire species. He was created by Eve and spread vampirism afterwards. When Crowley starts a hunt for Alphas to locate Purgatory, he starts sending telepathic messages to his "children" to create as many new vampires as they can. Dean sees this message when he's briefly infected with vampirism and the Campbells use it to track him down and capture him. The Alpha is tortured, but eventually breaks free, killing Christian Campbell. After a fight, Christian, who is revealed to be possessed by a demon, gets up and injects him with dead man's blood, incapacitating him. Afterwards, Crowley arrives and takes him away. The Alpha is held with all the other captured monsters in Crowley's prison, but escapes before Castiel can kill him like he does the other Alphas and monsters in the prison. The Alpha makes a deal with the Leviathans to share humanity among both species with the Leviathan substance that makes humans more docile making it easier for vampires to feed. After several of his vampires die after feeding on infected humans, the Alpha flees to his retreat at an old monastery where Sam and Dean track him down. However, Emily, a young woman he'd held prisoner for twelve years, calls him to warn him that they're coming. The Alpha captures Sam and Dean who ask for his blood, explaining that the Leviathan substance was what killed his vampires and that he'd been betrayed. The Alpha refuses to listen and after hearing that Edgar has arrived, orders the hunters locked up. The Alpha confronts Edgar who confirms Sam and Dean's story, telling him that the Leviathans intend to use the fact that so many monsters feed on humans to wipe them out. When Edgar insults Eve, the Alpha attacks him, throwing Borax in his face, but Edgar overpowers him. Before Edgar can kill the Alpha, Sam and Dean, who broke free, attack and Sam decapitates Edgar. Grateful for their actions and understanding that they have a common enemy, the Alpha gives Sam and Dean his blood without a fight and allows them to take a young boy named Alan he has captured. As they leave, warning him not to keep Edgar's head too close to his body, the Alpha taunts them that they truly want to kill him instead of leaving it for another time and promises to "see you next season".

The Alpha Vampire returns in "The Raid" when the British Men of Letters begin systematically wiping out all of the vampires in America. The Alpha Vampire leads an assault on the British compound where he faces off with Sam who arms himself with the Colt, the only weapon the British possess capable of harming the Alpha Vampire. Sam offers the Alpha Vampire a deal where he can have the British if he will leave the Winchesters alone to resume the old way of hunting. Sam is then attacked by Mick Davies and the Alpha Vampire by Mary Winchester before both are defeated. Sam then reveals to the Alpha Vampire it was all a distraction so he could get and load a bullet for the Colt. Impressed, the Alpha Vampire calls Sam a "clever, clever boy" before Sam shoots him through the head with the Colt. As the legendary gun's power works on him, the Alpha Vampire briefly laughs and smiles before dropping to the ground, dead.

=== Werewolves ===
Werewolves are one of the most recurring types of monsters on Supernatural. In the earlier seasons, werewolves are generally just mentioned in regards to old hunts or wrongly suspected as a culprit, making only a single appearance in season 2. It is not until their second appearance in season 8 that werewolves emerge as a more common type of monster. Werewolves are people who can change their appearance to gain claws, fangs, fur and superhuman abilities. Unlike most common lore and portrayals, werewolves do not change completely into a wolf-like appearance or a bipedal wolf-like appearance in this show. In Supernatural, werewolves can be created both through being bitten and through sexual reproduction. Supernatural features two types:

- Regular werewolves are the type that the Winchesters hunted in their earlier years while purebloods are the type featured in the later seasons of the show. Regular werewolves have no control of themselves and run on pure instinct. They appear to change while sleeping and the person lacks any memory of their actions. Regular werewolves are bound to the full moon for their change.
- Pureblood werewolves, which are from generations closer to the Alpha Werewolf, the first werewolf, can control the change which can happen at any time. Unlike regular werewolves, purebloods remember what has happened when they have transformed and if they choose, can control themselves rather than running on instinct alone. They can control their cravings and survive by feasting on animal hearts rather than human hearts if they so choose.

Werewolves of both types can be killed by silver to the heart and it is generally believed that there is no cure for lycanthropy. John Winchester believed that killing the sire werewolf would cure anyone they turned, but this turned out to be false. Other hunters, including Bobby Singer, were aware of this and believed there to be no cure.

In season 12, a group known as the British Men of Letters developed an experimental cure using the live blood of the sire werewolf which member Mick Davies called plasma therapy. It has to be administered during the early stages of lycanthropy and the werewolf cannot have killed anyone. Also, the sire werewolf has to be alive when the blood is drawn, complicating matters even further. Prior to the episode, the cure had only ever worked on rodents and even then only a single test subject out of ten. Their one-human test subject died in agony, causing the organization to abandon work on the cure. During the episode "Ladies Drink Free", Claire Novak becomes the first ever cured werewolf and while the cure works, it is excruciatingly painful for her and appears to work over a protracted period of time.

In season 2's "Heart", the Winchesters hunt a werewolf in San Francisco and discover that Sam's new love interest Madison (portrayed by Emmanuelle Vaugier) is a werewolf. The Winchesters determine that Madison was bitten by another werewolf who has been targeting prostitutes a month before and set out to try to save her. Following a theory in their father's journal, Dean kills the sire werewolf, Madison's neighbor Glen, in hopes of severing the bloodline to cure her. However, while sleeping with Sam that night, Madison transforms and escapes. With all other hunters stating that there is no cure, including Bobby Singer, Madison has a reluctant Sam kill her to keep Madison from hurting anyone else.

Season 8's "Bitten" is portrayed as a found footage episode following three young college students after one of them, Michael, is bitten by a werewolf and transforms. Michael becomes a pureblood werewolf which the three learn by following the Winchesters around. As Michael fights his instincts which leads to him killing people, his girlfriend Kate tries to protect him while his best friend Brian seeks to become a werewolf himself to become stronger, something that Michael resists doing. Brian eventually identifies their professor as the werewolf who bit Michael and the professor confesses that after years of surviving on animals, he gave into his instincts and killed someone. Knowing hunters would come, he turned Michael as a scapegoat. Brian forces the professor to turn him and the professor is subsequently tracked down and killed by Sam and Dean. Before dying, he thanks them for freeing him from what he felt was a curse. Driven insane by the power he has gotten, Brian kills Michael and turns Kate to be with her. Instead, Kate kills Brian and compiles all of the footage he has been putting together into a movie to show the Winchesters that they were not always monsters and did not want to become what they did. The Winchesters decide to give Kate a chance and do not hunt her down.

In season 9's "Sharp Teeth", the Winchesters discover that their friend and fellow hunter Garth was bitten on a hunt and became a pureblood werewolf. Garth joined a pack of supposedly-friendly werewolves after marrying the daughter of their leader. While most of the werewolves, who prefer to be called lycanthropes, are harmless, a small part of the pack turns out be part of a cult worshipping the Norse god Fenrir who they believe will bring about werewolf domination of the Earth when Ragnarok comes. The cult, led by Garth's mother-in-law, kidnaps Sam, Garth and Garth's wife Bess to murder Garth and Bess and frame the murders on Sam to spur the rest of the pack to join them. After figuring out the truth with the help of the pack's leader, Dean rescues the three and single-handedly kills all of the cultists. The Winchesters leave the rest of the pack be due to their peaceful nature. Later, in "Bloodlines", the Duval Family of Chicago are one of the Five Monster Families in the city. According to shapeshifter David Lassiter, the werewolves control the Gold Coast. The murder of shapeshifter Sal Lassiter by what appears to be a werewolf nearly drives the families to war. However, the Winchesters, wannabe-hunter Ennis Ross, shapeshifter David Lassiter and his ex-girlfriend werewolf Violet Duval discover that the true culprit is an insane hunter and prevent the war.

In season 10's "Paper Moon", the werewolf Kate returns as a suspect following several murders committed by a werewolf. Having worked hard to control herself, Kate reveals that she turned her sister Tasha to save Tasha's life after a serious car accident. Tasha refused to follow Kate's way of thinking and instead began building her own pack that hunts people. The Winchesters easily kill Tasha's two pack mates while Kate, after seeing the monster that Tasha has become, kills her sister herself before leaving again.

In season 11's "Red Meat", the Winchesters take on a werewolf case in a national park to take a break from their conflict with the Darkness. Unknown to them, the helpful bartender is the pack leader and she directs them right into a trap. The Winchesters manage to kill two werewolves, but Sam is seriously wounded when one werewolf shoots him with his own gun. The Winchesters rescue a young couple, Corbin and Michelle and are unaware the Corbin has been bitten. Chased by the remaining werewolves and dealing with the seriously injured Sam and Michelle, Corbin suffocates Sam when Dean will not leave him behind, apparently killing Sam. Though devastated, Dean helps Corbin and Michelle escape to a hospital where Corbin subsequently transforms into a werewolf and kills a doctor. At the same time, Sam, who was only put into a near-death state, regains consciousness in time to kill the remaining two werewolves and use their truck to return to the Impala. Sam arrives at the hospital in time to save Dean from Corbin who has become intoxicated by his new power as a werewolf, forcing Sam to kill him.

In a flashback to 1980 in season 12's "Celebrating the Life of Asa Fox", Mary Winchester kills a werewolf she has history with in Canada, saving the life of a young Asa Fox. The incident inspires Asa to go on to become a legendary hunter. In "Ladies Drink Free", the British Men of Letters have been systematically attacking werewolves along with other American monsters, using sulphate gas and silver nitrate to wipe out entire packs. As a result, a pureblood werewolf named Justin, driven insane by loneliness after his peaceful pack was killed, turns a girl named Hayden Foster to be his mate, murdering her brother at the same time. The action draws the attention of British Men of Letters operative Mick Davies who calls in the Winchesters for help. After discovering that Hayden is a werewolf, Mick reluctantly kills her with a silver injection. In response, Justin turns young hunter Claire Novak to replace Hayden. Due to her emotional issues, Claire requests to be killed as she doesn't believe she can control herself, but the Winchesters instead decide to try an experimental cure created by the British Men of Letters to save her, a cure that has never worked on a human subject. As the Winchesters try to find Claire's sire, Justin attacks and abducts Claire, but the Winchesters and Mick follow him using a tracker implanted on Claire by Mick. During the scuffle that follows, Mick manages to draw Justin's live blood before killing him with a silver bullet, allowing the Winchesters to create the cure. Though Claire experiences excruciating agony, she becomes the first werewolf ever to be cured.

In season 13's "Wayward Sisters", Claire hunts a small werewolf pack who kidnapped a young girl. Disguised as a delivery person, Claire kills the pack and rescues the girl before being called by Jody Mills to help as the Winchesters have disappeared. Subsequently, in "Breakdown", a werewolf is shown to be part of Terrance Clegg's online auction and wins the bid for Sam Winchester's heart. However, he never gets it as Clegg is killed by Dean moments later. In "Let the Good Times Roll", a pack of three werewolves is hunted by the Winchesters, Castiel and the Nephilim Jack. Castiel ambushes one outside of their hideout as he tries to smoke a cigarette and kills the werewolf with his angel blade. As the other two argue about the Kardashians, the Winchesters and Jack enter. Jack immobilizes the werewolves using telekinesis and Sam and Dean kill them with silver bullets without a fight.

In season 14's "Gods and Monsters", Michael approaches a werewolf pack to get their help in forming an army of monsters to destroy humanity. The pack leader agrees to work with Michael who enhances the werewolves using angel grace. Subsequently, four enhanced werewolves attack Sam and Mary Winchester along with Bobby Singer in an old church. Owing to their enhancements, they are stronger and faster than ever and immune to silver. However, Sam discovers that they are still vulnerable to decapitation which allows him and the other hunters to kill the four enhanced werewolves.

=== Witches ===
Witches are magic users appearing throughout Supernatural. According to witch Rowena MacLeod, the Grand Coven classifies witches into three categories: The Naturals, the Borrowers and the Students. The Naturals are witches born with natural power and are rare, Borrowers are witches who gain their powers through demon deals while the Students are witches who learn either on their own or are taught by other witches, but lack innate power and do not get it from a demon. Owing to the nature of the source of their powers, Borrowers are condemned to Hell as they have sold their souls for power. On Supernatural, witches mainly act through hex bags, a small cloth bag full of ingredients that acts as a medium for their spells. As a result, destroying the hex bag is usually enough to break a spell. Witches also often carry spell books known as grimoires. Examples are the Book of the Damned and the Black Grimoire which play major roles in the later seasons of the show.

As they are human, witches can die with the weaker witches being able to be killed through simple mortal injuries though stronger witches tend to be invulnerable to normal methods of harm. In season 11's "Love Hurts", Dean notes that being stabbed with a knife would only slow down a powerful witch rather than kill her. On several other occasions, powerful witches have scoffed at the idea of bullets harming them. In the earlier seasons, witches are more often than not killed by demons they have been dealing with than the Winchesters themselves. In season 8's "Man's Best Friend With Benefits", the Winchesters succeed in using a witch-killing spell learned from Bobby Singer in season 7's "Shut Up, Doctor Phil", to kill a hostile witch, albeit with the help of a distraction from a friendly witch's familiar. However, in season 10's "About a Boy", the same spell fails when the potion part of it is destroyed by the witch. Instead, Dean kills her by burning her in her own oven. In "Brother's Keeper", Sam modifies the witch-killing spell to be contained in hollow-point bullets. These new bullets, dubbed witch-killing bullets, are extremely effective against witches, killing even the most powerful witches who scoffed at the idea of bullets harming them. Seeing their first successful use in season 11's "Love Hurts", the bullets are used by the Winchesters whenever they come up against a witch, generally ending with the witch or witches being killed through being shot with the bullets.

==== Rowena MacLeod ====
Rowena MacLeod, portrayed by Ruth Connell, is a powerful witch and the mother of Fergus Rodrick MacLeod, who later became Crowley, the King of Hell. On one occasion, she claimed to have conceived him during a winter orgy without knowing which of the men present was his father, on another, she claimed he was the product of an affair with a wealthy married man. During his childhood, she abused, attempted to sell, and eventually abandoned him. Originating from Scotland, she claims to be one of the few natural-born users of magic. She was once a part of the Grand Coven, but was expelled due to her violent and forceful tendencies.

In season 10, Rowena attempts to restore her power base by recruiting women into becoming witches of her own coven, having to face the Winchesters along the way. She joins up with Crowley, intending to exert her influence on her son, though with Dean's advice, Crowley eventually banishes her. Rowena and Crowley play a game of cat-and-mouse as they try to hunt each other down, but are forced to work together to release Dean from the Mark of Cain, a task only Rowena can accomplish. In the process, Rowena has to kill a young(-seeming) Polish man named Oskar, the only person she truly cares for, whom she cured of a sickness and made immortal 300 years ago to thank his parents for giving her shelter. After releasing the Mark and unwittingly freeing The Darkness, Rowena escapes by turning Castiel against her son.

In season 11, still in the process of creating her coven, Rowena is asked by the Winchesters about a way to enter Lucifer's Cage in Hell, so they may find a way to stop the Darkness; while it is successful, Lucifer uses the opening to escape from the Cage. Enamored with the archangel, Rowena offers herself to join him, only to get herself killed once Lucifer confirms that she is the only one capable of sealing the Cage. Thanks to a spell she placed on her body, she is resurrected and vows to take revenge against Lucifer by teaming up with the Darkness, whose vessel she restores. Fearing for her power, Rowena bows out of the deal soon after and joins the Winchesters, Lucifer, Crowley and God in combating the Darkness.

In season 12, Rowena is asked by Crowley for help in finding Lucifer, who was incapacitated by the Darkness earlier and now possesses a rockstar's body. In "LOTUS", Rowena helps exorcise Lucifer out of the President of the United States and apparently send him back to the Cage.

In "Regarding Dean", Rowena is contacted by the Winchesters after Dean gets hit by a curse. Rowena recognizes the curse as one belonging to a family of druidic witches with whom she has a bad history and had believed she had wiped out. Rowena aids the Winchesters in killing the witches and breaks the curse on Dean, saving his life. While the Winchesters refuse to give Rowena the Black Grimoire, the family's spellbook, they promise they owe her "a little one". During the time Dean has no memory, Rowena tells him that she has had a change in perspective after witnessing the feud between God and The Darkness.

In "Family Feud", the Winchesters contact Rowena for help with finding her grandson, Gavin MacLeod who had been displaced to the present years before by Abaddon. Rowena aids the Winchesters in dealing with the situation by sending Gavin back to his own time to die against Crowley's wishes to set the timeline right. Rowena later tells Crowley that her actions were done to spite him for forcing her to kill Oskar in "Brother's Keeper".

In "All Along the Watchtower", the Winchesters attempt to contact Rowena for help in sealing Lucifer away once again only to learn that Lucifer has killed Rowena and burned her body to prevent resurrection. Both Lucifer and the Winchesters express a belief that Rowena is truly dead this time.

In "Various & Sundry Villains" Rowena returns as a result of the same precautionary spell as before, but has taken a longer time to heal because of the extent of her death. She's searching for the Black Grimoire because it contains a ritual that will allow her to remove the magical binding placed upon her by the Grand Coven and regain her full powers. She helps the Winchesters find the book after it has been taken by two sister witches who hope to bring their dead mother back to life. They successfully get the book back and even though the Winchesters keep the book, Sam, sympathetic with what Rowena has gone through at Lucifer's hands, allows Rowena to take the page with the ritual she needs and Rowena restores her full powers.

In "Funeralia" Rowena begins killing humans along with their reapers before their time, altering fate to get the attention of Death, whom she wishes to bring back her son, Crowley. The new Death, Billie, expresses sympathy towards her but refuses to bring back her son. Rowena wonders if she can be redeemed but agrees to help the Winchesters.

In "Unfinished Business", Rowena assists the Winchesters in finding Gabriel.

In "Beat the Devil", Rowena attempts to open up a rift to Apocalypse World, but the spell fails because the archangel grace provided by Gabriel is insufficient. Rowena and Gabriel debate why the spell failed and they proceed to have sex. Rowena then works with Gabriel, Castiel and the Winchesters to capture Lucifer to use him as a generator of archangel grace for the spell. They then succeed in binding Lucifer and opening up the rift, but Rowena stays behind with Lucifer who taunts her, causing her to accidentally reveals that Lucifer's son, Jack, is in Apocalypse World. This motivates Lucifer to break free and enter the rift. Rowena considers running, but ultimately stays behind to keep the rift open without Lucifer's grace.

In "Exodus", Rowena uses the Black Grimoire to find a spell to keep the rift open. She manages to keep the rift open long enough for the Winchesters and their surviving allies to escape Apocalypse World without Lucifer. During the celebrations, Sam thanks Rowena for keeping the rift open long enough for everyone to escape, and she admits that she could not have kept it open any longer.

In "Let the Good Times Roll" it is revealed in a conversation between Mary and alternate Bobby that Rowena and the alternate version of Charlie Bradbury from Apocalypse World are "road-tripping it through the Southwest" together.

In "The Rupture", after Belphegor's betrayal means that all of the souls and demons won't be sealed in Hell, Rowena reveals that she knows of a spell that can draw the remaining souls and demons inside of her body and cast them into Hell. However, it requires the sacrifice of her own life. Rowena cuts out her resurrection charm so she can't come back and requests Sam stab her as all versions of her death have Sam kill her and Rowena can't bring herself to do it. Sam tearfully hugs Rowena and stabs her in the abdomen. Drawing all of the souls inside of herself, Rowena says a final goodbye to Sam and Dean before throwing herself into Hell, saving the world. Rowena's death leaves Sam and Dean greatly distraught, Sam in particular.

In "Our Father, Who Aren't in Heaven", the Winchesters are shocked to encounter Rowena when they venture into Hell in search of Michael. Rowena explains that after her death, she managed to seize control of Hell for herself and is now the Queen of Hell. Rowena sends her demons to find Michael for the Winchesters and reassures Sam that he did the right thing by killing her. Noticing tension between Dean and Castiel, Rowena urges them to make amends, noting her own many regrets from life. However, the demons discover that Michael is gone from Hell and the Winchesters and Castiel are forced to leave empty-handed.

In "Destiny's Child", Sam and Dean return to Hell in search of the Occultum and ask a demon to take them to Rowena. Much to the demon's obvious annoyance, Rowena now holds receptions for newly condemned souls arriving in Hell and has forbidden further demon deals from being made, resolved that people will go to Hell only on their own merits. However, the demon turns out to have been hired by Anael along with two others to assassinate the Winchesters. Sam and Dean kill the three demons and depart Hell without ever meeting with Rowena.

===== In The Winchesters =====
In The Winchesters episode 12, "The Tears of a Clown", Ada Monroe encounters Rowena in 1972 while searching for magic that can stop the Akrida. Rowena offers to trade the magic for the demon that Ada had trapped in a bonsai tree, intending to torture it for information on Crowley and she taunts Ada into attacking her with magic. Afterwards, Rowena reveals that she was testing Ada's own magical abilities to see if she was worthy of joining Rowena's coven. Impressed, Rowena provides Ada with the magic that she needs to kill the Akrida Queen and informs her that the Queen will need an upcoming planetary alignment to open her portal. However, the magic requires Ada to sacrifice a piece of her own soul to power it. Before leaving, Rowena tells Ada that she's more powerful than she knows and suggests that Ada look her up if she survives.
