= Exile on Main St. (Supernatural) =

- Supernatural episode
- Episode no.: Season 6 Episode 1
- Directed by: Phil Sgriccia
- Written by: Sera Gamble
- Cinematography by: Serge Ladouceur
- Editing by: Tom McQuade
- Production code: 3X6052
- Original air date: September 24, 2010
- Running time: 42 minutes

Guest appearances
- Jim Beaver as Bobby Singer; Cindy Sampson as Lisa Braeden; Mitch Pileggi as Samuel Campbell; Fredric Lehne as Azazel; Nicholas Elia as Ben Braeden; Corin Nemec as Christian Campbell; Jessica Heafey as Gwen Campbell; David Paetkau as Mark Campbell; Russell Porter as Sid

Episode chronology
← Previous "Swan Song"	Next → "Two and a Half Men"
- Supernatural season 6

"Exile on Main St." is the first episode of the sixth season of paranormal drama television series Supernatural and the 105th overall. The episode was written by new showrunner Sera Gamble and directed by executive producer Phil Sgriccia. It was first broadcast on September 24, 2010, on The CW in its new timeslot on Friday nights.

== Plot ==
One year after Sam (Jared Padalecki) entered Lucifer's Cage, Dean has been living a normal life with Lisa and Ben, no longer hunting supernatural creatures. He hangs out with his neighbor, Sid (Russell Porter), but refuses to speak about his past as a hunter. He begins noticing strange occurrences in his neighborhood such as hearing screaming and seeing claw marks on doors. He is confronted by an hallucination of Azazel (Fredric Lehne) until Sam appears and sedates him.

Having regained consciousness, Sam reveals he mysteriously was freed from Lucifer's Cage a year ago. Throughout that time, he hunted along with his resurrected grandfather Samuel Campbell (Mitch Pileggi) and their cousins, Gwen (Jessica Heafey), Christian (Corin Nemec) and Mark (David Paetkau). They've been hunting three Djinn that want revenge after Sam and Dean killed their father. The Djinn kill another Campbell member who was sent to watch Ben and Lisa. Sensing they're in danger, Dean places them with Bobby Singer (Jim Beaver) -- who also knew Sam was resurrected a year ago—until everything is safe.

They see the Djinn wreaking chaos and try to capture them. Dean is attacked and gets hallucinations of Mary's death involving Ben and Lisa. Sam rescues Dean and kills another Djinn. When they leave, Samuel and the Campbells capture another Djinn. Sam tries to convince Dean to return to hunting but he refuses, although states that they will keep in touch.

== Reception ==
=== Viewers ===
The episode was watched by 2.90 million viewers with a 1.3/5 share among adults aged 18 to 49. This was a 2% increase in viewership from the fifth-season finale, which was watched by 2.84 million viewers but a 15% decrease from the previous season premiere, which was watched by 3.40 million viewers. This means that 1.3 percent of all households with televisions watched the episode, while 5 percent of all households watching television at that time watched it. Supernatural ranked as the second most watched program on The CW in the day, behind Smallville.

=== Critical reviews ===
Professional ratings
Review scores
Source	Rating
IGN	8.0
The A.V. Club	B+
TV Fanatic	3.5/5.0 stars
TV Overmind	B+

"Exile on Main St." received positive reviews. Diana Steenbergen of IGN gave the episode a "great" 8.0 out of 10 and wrote, "Supernatural is back, and ready to tackle a new crop of things that go bump in the night. A lot has changed for the Winchester brothers, and for the show itself as creator Eric Kripke has stepped down from the show runner role, handing over the reins to longtime writer and producer Sera Gamble. In addition, the task that Supernatural's sixth season faces is not an easy one. The storylines of the last few years have been able to build on the previous season, escalating the mythology to the apocalyptic Season 5. After an apocalypse, it is understandably necessary to bring things down a notch, and this season finds our heroes back to the more fundamental job of hunting down monsters, the first being a Djinn."

The A.V. Club's Zack Handlen gave the episode a "B+" grade and wrote, "Last season wasn't the end though, happy to say. It was the end for show creator Eric Kripke, who left after telling the story he'd wanted to tell, but Supernatural was renewed again (probably for the last time), and that meant the writers had to find some way to bring Sam back, and reunite the Winchesters. See, that's something else we know: whatever may have happened, this series is about the brothers fighting demons, and if you don't have both of them on board, you don't have a show. It doesn't matter that Sam gave his soul up to save world, and it doesn't matter that Dean found true love and the son he always wanted. We've seen this sort of thing before, and we know, sooner or later, the lights will flicker, and that's when the screaming starts. The question wasn't 'if.' The question was 'how,' and 'when.' The premiere episode of the season had to find away [sic] to reunite everybody that didn't seem cheap, but also didn't take too long to start delivering on the goods."

Clarissa of TV Overmind gave the episode a "B+" and wrote, "Overall, this was a decent start to a new season and, as Tamara said, I'm hopefully optimistic. Most of my fears have been put to rest and I want to know why the monsters are acting differently (chaos in hell because the world is off-balance after the failed apocalypse?) and especially what Mitch Pileggi is up to."

Sean McKenna of TV Fanatic gave a 3.5 star rating out of 5, stating: "The episode stuck strictly to Dean’s transformation after a year and it was a solid look at that. With all types of creatures running amuckamok on Earth, I have no idea what's ahead for the boys and that makes me excited to watch for what happens next. When will Dean get back in the hunting game? Will we ever find out how Samuel Campbell and Sam Winchester were pulled from heaven and hell? Is there a bigger force out there waiting for the brothers down the road?"
