= Sacrifice (Supernatural) =

- Supernatural episode
- Episode no.: Season 8 Episode 23
- Directed by: Phil Sgriccia
- Written by: Jeremy Carver
- Cinematography by: Serge Ladouceur
- Editing by: Nicole Baer
- Production code: 3X7823
- Original air date: May 15, 2013
- Running time: 42 minutes

Guest appearances
- Misha Collins as Castiel (special guest star); Mark A. Sheppard as Crowley; Curtis Armstrong as Metatron; Alaina Huffman as Abaddon; Kim Rhodes as Jody Mills

Episode chronology
| ← Previous "Clip Show" | Next → "I Think I'm Gonna Like It Here" |
- Supernatural season 8

"Sacrifice" is the twenty-third and final episode of the paranormal drama television series Supernatural's season 8, and the 172nd overall. The episode was written by showrunner Jeremy Carver and directed by executive producer Phil Sgriccia. It was first broadcast on May 15, 2013 on The CW. In the episode, Sam makes the ultimate sacrifice in order to complete the trials to lock the demons from Earth with the last trial being Crowley himself. Meanwhile, Dean allies with Castiel and Metatron ordered to finish the Heaven trials but they were ambushed by Naomi and her Angels, finally finding out what will happen when the spells are finished.

The episode received critical acclaim, many citing it as the best season finale since "Swan Song".

== Plot ==
Jody Mills (Kim Rhodes) is on a date with a man that she thinks is named Roderick but is actually Crowley (Mark A. Sheppard). The two get along great and Crowley claims to have lost someone special too, reminding Jody of the deaths of her son and husband and to start crying. Jody goes to the bathroom to calm down, but falls under a spell Crowley casts that causes her to choke on her own blood, unbeknownst to her there is a hex bag in her handbag. Sam (Jared Padalecki) and Dean (Jensen Ackles) call Crowley and demand he stop and he offers them a deal, using the little time Jody has left to force the issue. The deal is that they stop the undertaking the trials to close the Gates of Hell and give him the demon tablet, and he will stop killing Jody and everyone else they've ever saved. Dean agrees on the condition they trade the angel tablet for the demon tablet and Crowley agrees if they say "I surrender."

In order to make the deal happen, Kevin Tran (Osric Chau) digs up the first half of the tablet where he hid it, ironically under a sign depicting the Devil. Kevin puts the tablet halves back together and gives it to Sam and Dean. In return they give him the key to the Bunker, telling him to wait there. At the ruins of Singer Salvage Yard, Sam shows Crowley the demon tablet to prove he has it while Crowley shows them the angel tablet. Crowley produces a contract many yards long, and Dean insists on reading the fine detail. As he does, he gets close to Crowley and snaps the handcuffs on him that they found in the Bunker - ones covered in spell work that trap Crowley.

An angel named Nathaniel approaches Naomi (Amanda Tapping) with the news that one of their freelance operatives has spotted Castiel in Houston, Texas. To Naomi's shock, Nathaniel reveals that Metatron (Curtis Armstrong) has been spotted with him.

Metatron tells Castiel that the second trial is to obtain the bow of a Cupid. Metatron has ascertained that Dwight Charles - a bartender - will be shot by a Cupid's arrow. He and Metatron start watching Dwight, but Naomi arrives. She orders an angel to kill Castiel, but after the bartender shoots the angel and Metatron tells Castiel to stand down, she just leaves with her henchmen and Metatron.

In her office in Heaven, Naomi straps Metatron to a chair. Despite having never met in person, Metatron recognizes her as the angel that was supposed to "debrief" him after God left Heaven. Naomi tells him that the archangels wanted to know the secrets in his mind and she now wants to know why he came out of hiding and what his plans are. Naomi tortures Metatron and is shocked by what she finds, asking him why he is going with the plan that he is. Metatron tells her that he was elevated to God's Scribe and it was incredible, but he knew once God left the archangels would try to get God's secrets from him. He was forced to flee. Now, Metatron says, he wants revenge.

Sam and Dean take Crowley to a small church to undergo the third trial - to cure him of being a demon. They secure Crowley in the middle of a devil's trap. Sam needs to confess his sins in order to purify his blood to use on Crowley. Dean lists a number of things Sam has done working with Ruby, killing Lilith, letting Lucifer out, losing his soul, and not looking for Dean when he went to Purgatory.

Castiel arrives, telling Dean he needs his help in undertaking the trials. Dean is reluctant to go, but Sam insists he will be fine. At the Bunker they give the Angel Tablet to Kevin, and ask that he translate it, to find out what the remaining trials may be.

Cas and Dean return to watch Dwight Charles at his bar. They see a delivery woman Gail arrive at the bar, they think she will be the one that Dwight falls in love with. However she is the Cupid, and she causes Dwight and his regular customer Rod to fall in love. Outside the bar, Dean and Castiel tell the Cupid they need her bow, which appears as a mark on her hand. She tells them how chaotic Heaven is, and willingly helps them.

Meanwhile, Sam has continued injecting Crowley with his blood. At one point Crowley bites Sam, and when he leaves to get a bandage, Crowley creates a makeshift goblet of blood with his hand and uses the blood to send a call for help. Abaddon (Alaina Huffman) arrives, and throws Sam through a window, but she tells Crowley she is not there to help him, but to take over ruling Hell. But Sam douses her meatsuit with holy oil, setting her on fire, and she vacates the body and leaves. Crowley, who is obviously regaining his humanity, and tries to bond with Sam, tearfully declaring that he deserves to loved.

Naomi appears on Earth near where Castiel and Dean are talking on the phone to Kevin who has been examining the angel tablet, cannot find any mention of the trials Castiel has undertaken. Castiel angrily confronts her with his angel blade, but Naomi insists that she is just there to talk, not fight and Dean gets Castiel to hear her out. Naomi reveals what she has learned from Metatron: as revenge for his expulsion from Heaven, he is using Castiel to expel all angels permanently, not close the gates of Heaven. Castiel doesn't believe her, but Naomi insists that its true. She expresses regret for all of her actions, crying and tells Castiel and Dean that angels were meant to protect humanity and somewhere along the line they lost sight of that. Naomi, reminding Dean that she told him he could trust her, tells him that while she wants him to close the gates of Hell, she has learned that doing so will kill Sam, that God intended for the person closing the gates to have to make the ultimate sacrifice. Naomi tells Castiel that if he wishes to return to Heaven she is now willing to hear him out and disappears. Castiel doesn't believe her claims and Kevin Tran is unable to back them up with the angel tablet, but Dean does and has Castiel take him to Sam.

When Castiel finds Metatron, he extracts Castiel's grace from him, telling him it is the final part of a spell that will achieve what Naomi described. He sends Castiel, now a human, back to Earth and completes the spell.

Dean arrives just as Sam is about to complete the ritual, and begs him to stop warning it will kill him. Sam is nonplussed and tells Dean the sin he confessed earlier, was of all the times he had let Dean down. He fears if he does it again Dean will turn to someone else for support. Dean is passionate in disavowing this, "Don't you dare think that there is anything, past or present, that I would put in front of you!" he says. Sam says he feels consumed by the trial, and Dean holds him, telling him to let it go. The feeling seems to abate, but suddenly Sam is struck by pain.

Dean carries him outside, and they collapse on the ground near the Impala. Kevin is in the bunker when alarms begin to detect paranormal activities across the world at the same time. Then, Sam, Dean, Castiel and Crowley look to the sky and see thousands of angels falling to Earth.

== Reception ==
=== Viewers ===
The episode was watched by 2.31 million viewers with a 1.0/3 share among adults aged 18 to 49. This was a 13% increase in viewership from the previous episode, which was watched by 2.07 million viewers. 1.0 percent of all households with televisions watched the episode, while 3 percent of all households watching television at that time watched it. Supernatural ranked as the second most watched program on The CW in the day, behind Arrow.

=== Critical reviews ===
Professional ratings
Review scores
| Source | Rating |
|---|---|
| IGN | 9.4 |
| TV Fanatic | 5.0/5.0 stars |

"Sacrifice" received acclaim from critics. Diana Steenbergen of IGN gave the episode an "Amazing" 9.4 out of 10 and wrote in her verdict, "Supernatural's eighth season went out on a high note with some game changing twists and great performances. Plus, they continued the tradition of using 'Carry On Wayward Son' at the beginning; that never fails to get the season finale started on the right note. We were left with several cliffhangers: Sam's condition after stopping the trials, Castiel losing his angelic power, and the angels falling from heaven. I'm also curious to see if Crowley will be changed after nearly being cured or if he will revert to his old self. Plus Abaddon was on the loose. There will be plenty to keep the show occupied when it returns next season, that's for sure."

MaryAnn Sleasman of TV.com wrote,"'Sacrifice' wasn't a flawless finale — I kind of take issue with Dean's 'I didn't mean all that crap about not trusting you' monologue because, eh, he's seemed pretty freaking sincere about it the past several seasons, which is totally fine, but let's not conveniently forget about it just because Sam was about to nobly kill himself... again. It's not fair to Dean to cheapen his sincerity and in some cases, totally justified anger/hurt. And it's not fair to Sam to basically reduce his anger/hurt to an overreaction. However, that being my only major complaint with the episode, I'd say 'Sacrifice' was pretty close to perfect. It's definitely the best finale we've had since 'Swan Song' — unless you didn't like "Swan Song," in which case, feel free to substitute your own favorite. 'No Rest for the Wicked,' perhaps? Also a solid choice."

Hunter Bishop of TV Overmind wrote, "The season 8 finale of Supernatural delivered so many terrific individual moments, gave the fans a spectacular final 10 minutes, tied up some loose ends and left so many amazing possibilities for season 9 that my head is basically reeling."

Sean McKenna of "TV Fanatic" wrote, "After eight years and 172 episodes, Supernatural still knows exactly how to deliver a fantastic finale. 'Sacrifice' provided a gripping hour filled with laughs, heart, emotion, twists and a game-changing final moment that was as shocking as it was visually cool. I've still got to pick my jaw up off the floor with those closing moments, after having been engrossed in the entire hour. Not only was it a wild ride that made nothing what it seemed and things less easy to predict, but like any great finale should be, it has me excited for when the show picks up again next fall. This is definitely an episode worth watching again and one fans will be talking about. The bar has certainly been set high. Bravo, Supernatural. Way to close Supernatural season 8 with blazing, riveting and emotional-filled glory."

Caroline Preece of Den of Geek wrote, "Overall, this finale had the gumption to try something different, resisting the urge to trot out yet another good vs. evil fight that inevitably leads one of the brothers to a heaven/hell/purgatory dimension. It's refreshing and, for the first time in a long time, I'm excited about what we're going to see in the subsequent season premiere. Castiel is human!? Sam is still glowing!? Crowley is human(ish)!? Biggest of all, the angels are descending from heaven in a shower of awesome, and the reality that the Winchesters have been living in has changed forever. Bring on season nine."
