= Meet the New Boss =

Meet the New Boss may refer to:

- "Meet the New Boss" (Agents of S.H.I.E.L.D.), a 2016 television episode
- "Meet the New Boss" (Parenthood), a 2011 television episode
- "Meet the New Boss" (Suits), a 2012 television episode
- "Meet the New Boss" (Supernatural), a 2011 television episode

== See also ==
- Won't Get Fooled Again, which contains the lyrics "Meet the new boss"
