= Caged Heat (disambiguation) =

Caged Heat is a 1974 American women in prison film.

Caged Heat may also refer to:

- "Caged Heat" (Supernatural), a 2010 television episode
- "Caged Heat" (Summer House), a 2020 television episode
- "Caged heat", a professional wrestling match held in a cage
