= Hello, Cruel World (Supernatural) =

- Supernatural episode
- Episode no.: Season 7 Episode 2
- Directed by: Guy Bee
- Written by: Ben Edlund
- Cinematography by: Serge Ladouceur
- Editing by: Donald L. Koch
- Production code: 3X7053
- Original air date: September 30, 2011
- Running time: 41 minutes

Guest appearances
- Misha Collins as Castiel/The Leviathans (special guest star); Jim Beaver as Bobby Singer; Mark Pellegrino as Lucifer; Kim Rhodes as Sheriff Jody Mills; Cameron Bancroft as Dr. Gaines; Benito Martinez as Edgar; Olivia Steele-Falconer as Annie

Episode chronology
← Previous "Meet the New Boss"	Next → "The Girl Next Door"
- Supernatural season 7

"Hello, Cruel World" is the 2nd episode of the paranormal drama television series Supernatural's season 7, and the 128th overall. The episode was written by Ben Edlund and directed by Guy Bee. It was first broadcast on September 30, 2011 on The CW. In the episode, the Leviathans find that they can't stay in Castiel's body as it's rapidly declining his mental state and decide to spread through a water supply so they can find new vessels for themselves.

== Plot ==
After attacking Dean (Jensen Ackles) and Bobby (Jim Beaver), the Leviathans (Misha Collins) loses power as Jimmy Novak's body can't handle too many Leviathans at once and his body is rapidly deteriorating. The Leviathans leave while Sam (Jared Padalecki) is still tortured mentally by Lucifer (Mark Pellegrino), subsequently being woken by Dean.

The Leviathans walk into a reservoir water supply and sink so the Leviathans are spread throughout the water supply and find new vessels for each one. Castiel is nowhere to be found, and Dean takes his coat which washes up on shore. The Leviathans begin to possess people through the water supply, including a young girl (Olivia Steele-Falconer) and a mechanic (Benito Martinez). The young girl soon possesses Dr. Gaines (Cameron Bancroft) and begins to feed on the livers of patients of the Sioux Falls General Hospital. This is watched by Sheriff Jody Mills (Kim Rhodes) and she tries to escape from the hospital but she collapses due to a surgery.

Dean investigates a massacre that took place in a swimming team and after finding the black ooze, he finds out that the Leviathans are responsible. Jody calls Bobby to help her escape from the Leviathans while Dr. Gaines meets with the mechanic, Edgar, to begin killing people in the hospital so they can feed on them daily, just like their "boss" told them to. Bobby manages to take Jody out of the hospital and begins investigating in the hospital at the morgue.

Sam and Dean leave in the Impala but, unknown to Sam, "Dean" is in fact Lucifer disguised. He takes Sam to a warehouse and reveals himself to Sam, causing Sam to shoot at him multiple times. Taunting him further, Lucifer tells Sam to just kill himself to end the nightmare. The real Dean arrives and manages to convince him that their world is real. They then receive a call from Bobby and head to his house but they find it burned and, as his cellphone does not answer, they begin to think that he is dead. Just then, Edgar arrives and attacks them but Dean manages to drop a car on him, crushing him. As their wounds are severe, they are taken in an ambulance. Due to the severe knock on his head, Sam is now being disturbed again by Lucifer and suffers a seizure. As Dean calms him down, he is shocked to find that they are headed to Sioux Falls General Hospital. In Bobby's yard, Edgar's blood begins to return to his body and his hand begins moving, indicating he is still alive.

== Reception ==
=== Viewers ===
The episode was watched by 1.80 million viewers with a 0.7/2 share among adults aged 18 to 49. This was an 11% decrease in viewership from the previous episode, which was watched by 2.01 million viewers with a 0.8/3 share rating in the 18-49 demographics. This means that 0.7 percent of all households with televisions watched the episode, while 2 percent of all households watching television at that time watched it. Supernatural ranked as the most watched program on The CW in the day, beating Nikita.

=== Critical reviews ===
Professional ratings
Review scores
Source	Rating
IGN	8.5
The A.V. Club	B+
TV Fanatic	3.6/5 stars

"Hello, Cruel World" received mostly positive reviews. Diana Steenbergen of IGN gave the episode a "great" 8.5 out of 10 and wrote, "Since this episode was written by Ben Edlund, there was great dialog throughout, my favorite line being when Dean told the hallucinating Sam that 'this discussion does not require a weapons discharge!' You can always count on Supernatural to lighten even the grimmest episode with some humorous one-liners."

Zack Handlen of The A.V. Club gave the episode an "A−" and wrote, "So Sam is really, really, really screwed in 'Hello Cruel World,' and what makes this episode work -- what, in fact, is getting me very excited about this season as a whole -- is that he's not the only one. The Winchesters and their fellow good guys have never had the best of luck when fighting the forces of darkness. Much like Whedon's famous 'no happy endings' clause for Buffy, Supernatural has always resisted rose-colored conclusions, and the show's status quo is grim with a slice of horror pie. But this feels different, somehow. Not hugely different, no one's re-inventing the wheel, but even more so than last week's premiere, tonight's episode was focused, intense, and as dark as I think I've ever seen on the series before."

Sean McKenna from TV Fanatic, gave a 3.6 star rating out of 5, stating: "All in all, 'Hello Cruel World' brought out the good old fashioned Supernatural style and tone fans have come to know, but compared to the premiere, it wasn't as exciting or dramatically intense. Hopefully, things pick back up again next week."
