= Supernatural season 7 =

Supernatural
- Season 7
- DVD cover art
- Showrunner: Sera Gamble
- Starring: Jared Padalecki; Jensen Ackles
- No. of episodes: 23

Release
- Original network: The CW
- Original release: September 23, 2011 – May 18, 2012

Season chronology
- ← Previous; Season 6 Next → Season 8

The seventh season of Supernatural, an American dark fantasy television series created by Eric Kripke, premiered September 23, 2011, and concluded May 18, 2012, airing 23 episodes. The season focuses on protagonists Sam (Jared Padalecki) and Dean Winchester (Jensen Ackles) facing a new enemy called Leviathans, stronger than anything they have encountered so far as well as rendering their usual weapons useless.

On January 12, 2012, the season won two People's Choice Awards including Best Network TV Drama. This is the second and final season of Sera Gamble as showrunner, with Jeremy Carver taking over the role for season eight. Warner Home Video released the season on DVD and Blu-ray in Region 1 on September 18, 2012, in region 2 on November 5, 2012, and in Region 4 on October 31, 2012. The seventh season had an average viewership of 1.73 million U.S. viewers.

== Cast ==
=== Starring ===
- Jared Padalecki as Sam Winchester
- Jensen Ackles as Dean Winchester

=== Special guest stars ===
- Misha Collins as Castiel / Emanuel
- James Marsters as Don Stark
- Charisma Carpenter as Maggie Stark
- DJ Qualls as Garth Fitzgerald IV

=== Guest stars ===
- Jim Beaver as Bobby Singer
- James Patrick Stuart as Dick Roman
- Benito Martinez as Edgar
- Mark A. Sheppard as Crowley
- Kevin McNally as Frank Devereaux
- Mark Pellegrino as Lucifer
- Cameron Bancroft as Dr. Gaines
- Osric Chau as Kevin Tran
- Olivia Cheng as Susan
- Rachel Miner as Meg Masters
- Kim Rhodes as Sheriff Jody Mills
- Sean Owen Roberts as Chet
- Larissa Gomes as Louise
- Khaira Leyedo as Linda Tran
- Felicia Day as Charlie Bradbury
- Carrie Fleming as Karen Singer
- Madison McLaughlin as Krissy Chambers
- Emily Perkins as Becky Rosen
- Emma Grabinsky and Jewel Staite as Amy Pond
- Julian Richings as Death
- Alona Tal as Jo Harvelle
- Steven Williams as Rufus Turner
- Rick Worthy as Alpha Vampire
- Leslie Odom Jr. as Guy

== Episodes ==
In this table, the number in the first column refers to the episode's number within the entire series, whereas the number in the second column indicates the episode's number within this particular season. "U.S. viewers in millions" refers to how many Americans watched the episode live or on the day of broadcast.

| No. overall | No. in season | Title | Directed by | Written by | Original release date | Prod. code | U.S. viewers (millions) |
|---|---|---|---|---|---|---|---|
| 127 | 1 | "Meet the New Boss" | Phil Sgriccia | Sera Gamble | September 23, 2011 | 3X7052 | 2.01 |
Castiel appoints himself the new God and sets out to right some of the wrongs in the world, but is increasingly disturbed by ravenous entities called Leviathans, which were locked into Purgatory to prevent them from eating the rest of God's creations. Sam, Dean, and Bobby help Castiel send all the souls he had consumed back into Purgatory, but the Leviathans remain in Castiel's body and kill him from within.
| 128 | 2 | "Hello, Cruel World" | Guy Bee | Ben Edlund | September 30, 2011 | 3X7053 | 1.80 |
Seeking a steady food supply of humans, the Leviathans infiltrate various human establishments, including Sioux Falls General. Sam continues to see Lucifer and questions if the world he sees is real or if he is still in Hell. When the brothers return to Bobby's house, they are attacked by the Leviathan Edgar. Though they manage to stop him by crushing him under a car, Dean's leg is broken and Sam is knocked unconscious. While being carted off in an ambulance, both brothers receive a shock: Sam is still seeing Lucifer and Dean learns that the ambulance is taking them to Sioux Falls General Hospital.
| 129 | 3 | "The Girl Next Door" | Jensen Ackles | Andrew Dabb & Daniel Loflin | October 7, 2011 | 3X7051 | 1.72 |
After being sprung from Sioux Falls General Hospital by a perfectly alive Bobby, Dean and Sam join him and lay low for three weeks while Dean's broken leg heals. The brothers fight a Kitsune which takes the form of their old acquaintance, Amy Pond. Sam refuses to kill Amy when he has the chance, so Dean does so behind Sam's back.
| 130 | 4 | "Defending Your Life" | Robert Singer | Adam Glass | October 14, 2011 | 3X7054 | 1.69 |
In Dearborn, Michigan, Dean and Sam learn that the Egyptian god Osiris is responsible for a series of local killings. Osiris puts people on trial for any mistakes they've made in the past and kills them if they feel any guilt in their hearts. Upon sensing Dean's guilt, Osiris puts him on trial with Sam becoming Dean's lawyer.
| 131 | 5 | "Shut Up, Dr. Phil" | Phil Sgriccia | Brad Buckner & Eugenie Ross-Leming | October 21, 2011 | 3X7055 | 1.92 |
While investigating a series of gruesome deaths in Prosperity, Indiana, the brothers learn that each victim was connected to Donald Stark, a wealthy businessman, philanthropist and pillar of the community. Donald and his wife Maggie are both powerful witches who take out their marital frustrations in the form of destructive magical happenings. Sam and Dean try to stop the couple with a ritual, but end up giving them marriage counseling instead.
| 132 | 6 | "Slash Fiction" | John F. Showalter | Robbie Thompson | October 28, 2011 | 3X7056 | 1.74 |
Sam and Dean are framed for a series of murder-robberies by two Leviathans that take the forms of the Winchester brothers. The brothers track the Leviathans across the country and eventually find them in Iowa, but are arrested by local law enforcement. The local sheriff helps Sam and Dean when he sees the Leviathan eating one of the officers and turning into Sam and Dean. Sam finds out Dean killed Amy, causing tension between the boys.
| 133 | 7 | "The Mentalists" | Mike Rohl | Ben Acker & Ben Blacker | November 4, 2011 | 3X7057 | 1.84 |
Sam and Dean discover that an angry spirit is killing off resident mediums in Lily Dale, New York, the most "psychic" town in America. While Dean holds off the ghost, Margaret Fox, Sam locates the psychic who raised her: Jimmy Tomorrow, a pawnshop owner. Sam is forced to kill Jimmy in self-defense, but is able to salt and burn Margaret's bones and put her to rest. Sam and Dean reconcile their differences over Dean killing Amy and leave town, once again hunting together.
| 134 | 8 | "Season 7, Time for a Wedding!" | Tim Andrew | Andrew Dabb & Daniel Loflin | November 11, 2011 | 3X7058 | 1.85 |
Becky Rosen obtains a love potion from a demon and begins administering it to Sam. When they announce their engagement, Dean senses something is wrong. The brothers trap and kill the demon with the help of quirky hunter Garth.
| 135 | 9 | "How to Win Friends and Influence Monsters" | Guy Bee | Ben Edlund | November 18, 2011 | 3X7059 | 1.55 |
Sam, Dean and Bobby attempt to figure out what kind of monster is killing campers in Hammonton, New Jersey. The hunters soon learn that the monster was a person who turned into a zombie after eating the turducken sandwich at the local diner. The meat was created by the Leviathans, who have been working on a food additive designed to render humans complacent and mindless. Their leader, Dick Roman, closes the project down. The brothers break into the meat facility and free Bobby, who has been taken prisoner, but not before Bobby is shot by Roman.
| 136 | 10 | "Death's Door" | Robert Singer | Sera Gamble | December 2, 2011 | 3X7060 | 1.89 |
Bobby spends the majority of the episode in a coma, making his way through a network of his own memories, while a reaper follows him in an attempt to secure Bobby's soul. In the real world, Bobby is determined to get a cryptic combination of numbers to Sam and Dean. He manages to emerge from his coma long enough to write the numbers on Sam's hand, upon which his heart stops.
| 137 | 11 | "Adventures in Babysitting" | Jeannot Szwarc | Adam Glass | January 6, 2012 | 3X7061 | 1.82 |
Sam and Dean help Krissy, the daughter of a fellow hunter, find her father after he goes missing on the job. Things degenerate into a hostage situation, but Krissy kills one of the monsters, allowing the Winchesters to gain the upper hand and kill the other. Following the advice of the brothers, Krissy's father decides to leave the life so she can have a normal life. Before reaching Sam, Dean goes to Frank who finds the meaning of the numbers (turns out to be coordinates). They survey the area.
| 138 | 12 | "Time After Time" | Phil Sgriccia | Robbie Thompson | January 13, 2012 | 3X7062 | 1.55 |
Sam and Dean find a case involving people who are murdered and mummified, always in groups of three. They link the murders to Chronos, the Greek Titan of Time. As they chase him down an alley, Chronos pulls Dean back in time with him to 1944. Parallel investigations in 1944 and 2012 see Dean teaming up with Eliot Ness, who is also a hunter, and Sam working with Sheriff Mills to bring Dean back to the present and kill Chronos. Before dying, Chronos predicts that the boys' future will be "covered in thick black ooze."
| 139 | 13 | "The Slice Girls" | Jerry Wanek | Eugenie Ross-Leming & Brad Buckner | February 3, 2012 | 3X7063 | 1.72 |
Dean's bar hookup turns out to be part of a tribe of Amazons, who are using the men of Seattle, Washington as breeding stock. The girls are born and grow up in a matter of days, whereupon they are taken away for training by their leader, the goddess Harmonia. Their fathers are ritually slaughtered. When Dean's daughter arrives to kill him, Dean hesitates in killing her. Sam does it for him, reminding him of what he said after he killed Amy.
| 140 | 14 | "Plucky Pennywhistle's Magical Menagerie" | Mike Rohl | Andrew Dabb & Daniel Loflin | February 10, 2012 | 3X7064 | 1.88 |
Sam and Dean investigate a series of bizarre deaths in Wichita, Kansas, where all of the victims had recently taken their families to a children's restaurant called Plucky Pennywhistle's Magical Menagerie. After interrogating the staff, Dean discovers a ritual setup in the basement and Sam confronts his coulrophobia. One of the employees, Howard, has become obsessed with punishing neglectful parents, as he blames his own parents for his brother's death. Dean turns Howard's own fears against him by summoning the ghost of his dead brother as Sam fights off killer clowns sent by Howard.
| 141 | 15 | "Repo Man" | Thomas J. Wright | Ben Edlund | February 17, 2012 | 3X7065 | 1.74 |
Four years ago, Sam and Dean helped a woman named Nora exorcise a demon that was systematically killing women in Coeur d'Alene, Idaho. They managed to save a postal worker, Jeffrey, while vanquishing the demon. A group of similar killings prompts the brothers to return to town to determine if the demon has returned. While conducting research, Sam's visions of Lucifer intensify. He later fully acknowledges Lucifer after he proves helpful with the case. Dean and Jeffrey end up finding the demon's old hideout, as well as Nora's son, who is being held captive. Dean is tied up by Jeffrey. Jeffrey desperately wishes to reunite with the demon who possessed him to become even more powerful. Nora exorcises the demon and the brothers return to the motel to rest. Unfortunately, because Sam "let him in", Lucifer is now able to unleash complete torment over Sam and he is unable to sleep.
| 142 | 16 | "Out With the Old" | John F. Showalter | Robert Singer & Jenny Klein | March 16, 2012 | 3X7066 | 1.73 |
After a ballerina is found dead from dancing herself to death in Portland, Oregon, Sam and Dean discover the ballet slippers she wore were cursed. Sam and Dean find the antiques dealer who sold the slippers, as well as three other cursed objects. The dealer reveals that his mother collected the objects and was killed in a car crash after selling her store to a realtor named Joyce, who has been buying up several properties in town. Sam and Dean discover that Joyce was acting as a front for the Leviathans, who were buying the properties to make way for a research center dedicated to curing cancer. The boys wonder why the Leviathans would be helping humans and discover Frank's trailer trashed and covered in blood.
| 143 | 17 | "The Born-Again Identity" | Robert Singer | Sera Gamble | March 23, 2012 | 3X7067 | 1.63 |
Lucifer has driven Sam to the point of mental breakdown and Dean promises Sam he will find a cure. Another hunter leads Dean to a faith healer named Emanuel, who turns out to be an amnesiac Castiel. Dean convinces him to come with him to heal Sam. They are joined by Meg Masters. Once they reach the hospital, they find it covered by demons. Castiel kills the demons, and along the way, gains back his memories. Castiel transfers Sam's madness and experience in Hell to himself. Sam is released and Castiel stays in the hospital, plagued with the visions of Lucifer. Meg takes a job in the hospital to look after Castiel.
| 144 | 18 | "Party On, Garth" | Phil Sgriccia | Adam Glass | March 30, 2012 | 3X7068 | 1.78 |
Sam, Dean and Garth investigate the case of a Shōjō (猩猩, a Japanese alcohol spirit), targeting the children of the owners of a local brewery. They find out that the owners had removed one of their partners, who wasn't in favor of selling the brewery. This partner, Dale, had been the brains behind the company, and upon being removed from his position, had taken his own life. Before he died, Dale had placed the Shōjō in a spell box and sent it as an apology to his old partners, making sure that once the box was open, the Shōjō would kill their children. Dean kills the Shōjō with a blessed katana.
| 145 | 19 | "Of Grave Importance" | Tim Andrew | Brad Buckner & Eugenie Ross-Leming | April 20, 2012 | 3X7069 | 1.57 |
Sam and Dean get a call from fellow hunter Annie Hawkins, asking for help on a case in Bodega Bay, California. When they arrive in town, Annie has disappeared. They trace her last whereabouts to an old abandoned house that is haunted by the ghosts of a murderer and his victims. The boys defeat the ghosts with assistance from the ghost of Bobby, who has tied himself to an old hip flask which Dean kept as a memento.
| 146 | 20 | "The Girl with the Dungeons and Dragons Tattoo" | John MacCarthy | Robbie Thompson | April 27, 2012 | 3X7070 | 1.61 |
Bobby's ghost informs Sam and Dean that the Leviathans plan to turn humanity into the perfect food source for as long as the Leviathans exist. A hacker working for Dick Roman also finds out the truth about her boss and teams up with the brothers as they launch another attack on Roman. Bobby attacks Roman and displays signs of becoming a vengeful spirit, which worries Sam and Dean. Charlie goes into hiding, while Roman worries about the Winchesters figuring out the tablet they stole from him.
| 147 | 21 | "Reading Is Fundamental" | Ben Edlund | Ben Edlund | May 4, 2012 | 3X7071 | 1.66 |
Sam and Dean break open the clay tablet they stole from Dick Roman, which Castiel explains contains information from God written out by the celestial scribe Metatron. The opening causes the waking of a prophet, a teenager named Kevin Tran, who holds the power to interpret the tablet. The tablet and the prophet are also sought by two angels. He interprets the tablet for them before the angels take him back to his house, where the Leviathans kidnap him.
| 148 | 22 | "There Will Be Blood" | Guy Bee | Andrew Dabb & Daniel Loflin | May 11, 2012 | 3X7072 | 1.58 |
Various plot threads introduced throughout the season begin to converge. Dick Roman forces Kevin Tran to translate the Word for him by threatening Kevin's mother. The Leviathans' mind-numbing meat additive makes its way through the population. Sam and Dean track down the Alpha Vampire, to get his blood for making of a weapon that can kill the Leviathans. Bobby shows greater signs of becoming a vengeful spirit.
| 149 | 23 | "Survival of the Fittest" | Robert Singer | Sera Gamble | May 18, 2012 | 3X7073 | 1.56 |
Sam, Dean, Meg Masters, and Castiel marshal their forces for the final battle against Roman and his Leviathans. They infiltrate to where Dick Roman is and kills him. After killing him, Dean and Castiel find themselves in Purgatory (as they were near to him when he died, thus taking them to Purgatory with him) surrounded by monsters as Castiel disappears. Crowley appears and takes away Kevin, leaving Sam alone.

== Production ==
The series was renewed for a seventh season on April 26, 2011, and remained on Fridays at 9:00 pm (ET).

The CW announced on August 20, 2011, that the season would be increased to 23 episodes, up one episode from the 22-episode pickup the series had previously received.

On January 11, 2012, it was announced by the executive producer of the show, Robert Singer, that there was another cliffhanger ending planned for season seven.

== Reception ==
Critical reception to the season was generally positive. The review aggregator website Rotten Tomatoes reported a 100% approval rating with an average rating of 8.8/10 based on 5 reviews. One criticism from reviewers was of the lack of an emotional link between the Leviathans as a whole and the Winchester brothers, an element which had been present in previous seasons. The lack of threat from the monsters was also noted as a downside to the season, though the portrayal of James Patrick Stuart as Dick Roman, using corporate mannerisms and charm mixed with his own self-confidence, was pointed to as a high point of the story arc.

The overturn of Mark Sheppard's character Crowley at the final moments of the season, was very surprising for the critics. Many argued that Crowley's successful separation of the Winchester brothers by taking advantage of Dean's imprisonment in Purgatory and the kidnap of both Kevin and Meg was a good cliffhanger going into the next season, and that it opened up many possibilities and questions. Another well-received point was the return of the Impala at the end of season, much to the appreciation of the fans, and Misha Collins' portrayal of the resurrected and traumatized Castiel, which brought a new element to the chemistry between the brothers.
