= Supernatural season 8 =

Supernatural
- Season 8
- DVD cover art
- Showrunner: Jeremy Carver
- Starring: Jared Padalecki; Jensen Ackles
- No. of episodes: 23

Release
- Original network: The CW
- Original release: October 3, 2012 – May 15, 2013

Season chronology
- ← Previous; Season 7 Next → Season 9

The eighth season of Supernatural, an American dark fantasy television series created by Eric Kripke, premiered October 3, 2012, and concluded on May 15, 2013, airing 23 episodes. It is the first season headed by Jeremy Carver as executive producer and showrunner. It aired on Wednesdays at 9:00 pm (ET) on The CW. The season was released on DVD and Blu-ray in region 1 on September 10, 2013, in region 2 on October 28, 2013, and in region 4 on September 25, 2014. The eighth season had an average viewership of 2.12 million U.S. viewers. In the season, Dean reunites with Sam after escaping from Purgatory. The duo team up with the prophet, Kevin, to complete a series of trials that will allow them to close the gates of Hell for good.

== Cast ==
=== Starring ===
- Jared Padalecki as Sam Winchester
- Jensen Ackles as Dean Winchester

=== Special guest stars ===
- Misha Collins as Castiel
- DJ Qualls as Garth Fitzgerald IV

=== Special appearance by ===
- Jim Beaver as Bobby Singer

=== Guest stars ===
- Mark A. Sheppard as Crowley
- Osric Chau as Kevin Tran
- Liane Balaban as Amelia Richardson
- Ty Olsson as Benny Lafitte
- Amanda Tapping as Naomi
- Curtis Armstrong as Metatron
- Alaina Huffman as Abaddon
- Tyler Johnston as Samandriel
- Felicia Day as Charlie Bradbury
- Lauren Tom as Linda Tran
- Jon Gries as Martin Creaser
- Gil McKinney as Henry Winchester
- Hal Linden as Rabbi Isaac Bass
- Adam Rose as Aaron Bass
- John DeSantis as Golem
- Rachel Miner as Meg Masters
- Madison McLaughlin as Krissy Chambers
- Taylor Cole as Sarah Blake
- Kim Rhodes as Sheriff Jody Mills

== Episodes ==
In this table, the number in the first column refers to the episode's number within the entire series, whereas the number in the second column indicates the episode's number within this particular season. "U.S. viewers in millions" refers to how many Americans watched the episode live or on the day of broadcast.

No. overall	No. in season	Title	Directed by	Written by	Original release date	Prod. code	U.S. viewers (millions)
150	1	"We Need to Talk About Kevin"	Robert Singer	Jeremy Carver	October 3, 2012	3X7802	1.85
Dean escapes Purgatory along with a vampire named Benny and travels to the safe house in Whitefish, Montana, where he meets up with Sam, who gave up the "family business" while Dean was gone. The boys discover prophet Kevin Tran has escaped from Crowley and is on the run with the Word of God tablet. Kevin tells them that the tablet contains a spell that can close the gates of hell forever. Crowley demands that Kevin come with him and return the tablet, but Kevin once again outwits him and escapes with the Winchesters. Crowley then murders Kevin's girlfriend Channing to spite Kevin.
151	2	"What's Up, Tiger Mommy?"	John F. Showalter	Andrew Dabb & Daniel Loflin	October 10, 2012	3X7803	2.51
Kevin, Sam, and Dean locate Kevin's mother and rescues her from demons. She insists on coming with them. They chase down the Word of God tablet to an auction for supernatural beings, but Crowley still manages to get away with it. Kevin decides to take his mother and leave for fear that their association with the Winchesters will get them killed. Dean has recollections from his time in Purgatory wherein after much searching, he and Benny locate Castiel.
152	3	"Heartache"	Jensen Ackles	Brad Buckner & Eugenie Ross-Leming	October 17, 2012	3X7801	2.13
The brothers investigate a series of murders which occur once every six months. After one of their suspects stabs himself in the eye, Dean learns that each killer had received an organ transplant from the recently deceased athlete Brick Holmes. The Winchesters also learn that "Brick" was actually a Mayan athlete who had made a deal with an ancient Mayan god to live forever and excel at various sports under different aliases over the centuries in exchange for sacrifices of human hearts each year. Brick's wife tells the brothers that they must destroy Brick's heart to end the murders. Upon tracking down the woman who received Brick's heart, Sam and Dean stab her in the heart, sparking a chain reaction that results in the deaths of not only the woman but also the recipients of Brick's other organs.
153	4	"Bitten"	Thomas J. Wright	Robbie Thompson	October 24, 2012	3X7804	1.86
Most of the episode is presented as found footage from the perspective of three film school students: Brian, Michael, and Kate. Michael is bitten by a werewolf and begins exhibiting supernatural traits. Things get out of hand when he kills a bully for threatening Kate. Trying to find out what's happening to Michael, the three film students spy on Sam and Dean, who in turn are trying to find the werewolf. Brian finds and goes to the werewolf who turned Michael and forces him to turn Brian into a werewolf too by threatening to reveal his secret. Dean and Sam arrive after Brian leaves and kills the werewolf. Michael and Brian had a fight in which he kills Michael and turns Kate, he tells her he is in love with her and wants her to live with him, but Kate betrays and kills him. Kate edits all their footage together into a movie for Sam and Dean to watch and understand what happened, finishing with a promise that she will feed off of animal hearts and not harm humans, asking for a chance to live in peace. Sam and Dean agree to give her the chance she asked for.
154	5	"Blood Brother"	Guy Bee	Ben Edlund	October 31, 2012	3X7805	1.78
Taking a break from searching for Kevin, Dean help vampire Benny Lafitte hunt down and kill the vampire who turned him but was also the one responsible for his murder. It is revealed Benny's girlfriend Andrea also got turned. Benny is captured, Dean calls Sam for help. Dean and Benny kill the vampires and Benny's maker while Sam is on his way. Andrea helps Benny, but it turns out that she wants to take over, so Dean kills her before she can harm Benny. A subplot, told in flashback, details how Sam met his girlfriend, Amelia.
155	6	"Southern Comfort"	Tim Andrew	Adam Glass	November 7, 2012	3X7806	2.32
Sam, Dean, and Garth investigate a series of incidents wherein people harboring longstanding grudges felt compelled to kill their old enemies. The object behind these murders is a penny once carried by a Confederate soldier from the American Civil War who was killed in battle by his brother. He, as a specter, possesses the people who come in contact with the coin, thereby killing the ones those people have grudge against. Dean comes into contact with the coin and is possessed. He tries to kill Sam, but Garth manages to distance the coin from him. Because Garth is a naturally passive person with no wishes for revenge in life, the penny has no effect on him, and he is able to destroy it by burning it. The Sam and Amelia subplot from the prior episode continues.
156	7	"A Little Slice of Kevin"	Charles Robert Carner	Eugenie Ross-Leming & Brad Buckner	November 14, 2012	3X7807	2.32
After Sam and Dean investigate a series of abductions, a weakened Castiel appears to them with no memory of how he escaped Purgatory. The abductions turn out to be known future prophets, as only one prophet can exist at a time, meaning that one of them will become the new prophet if Kevin dies. The demons are the ones doing the abductions, they get the information about the prophets by torturing the angel Samandriel. Dean has flashbacks of his escape from Purgatory and deals with his guilt for not saving Castiel. Kevin is tortured by Crowley into translating the tablet and reveals to Crowley that there are more tablets. Sam, Dean, and Castiel intervene and save Kevin from Crowley. Castiel breaks the tablet in two pieces and Crowley flees, taking one half of the tablet with him. Kevin and the remaining prophets are rescued. Castiel reveals that he chose not to leave Purgatory with Dean, telling Dean that remaining in Purgatory was his penance for his previous actions. During the conversation with Dean and Sam, Castiel is briefly transported to an office-like space in heaven where a woman named Naomi inquiries about the Winchesters. She reveals that it was the angels that rescued Castiel from purgatory and orders him to help the Winchesters, before saying this reporting will occur regularly and he will not remember this and no one will notice him reporting to her midway through the conversation with the Winchesters.
157	8	"Hunteri Heroici"	Paul Edwards	Andrew Dabb	November 28, 2012	3X7808	2.00
Sam, Dean, and Castiel investigate a string of deaths in Oklahoma City, Oklahoma, that appear to have been inspired by cartoon tropes. The effects are caused by an old man named Fred Jones, who has reality warping powers, and is currently living in a dream world inside his mind while residing in an assisted care facility. Fred is being used by a doctor at the assisted care facility to rob other elderly patients of their valuables. While Dean confronts the doctor, Sam and Castiel enter Fred's mind to speak to him. Sam is able to convince Fred to give up living in a dream world and come back to reality, causing the reality warping effects to end. Fred forces the doctor to kill himself and has Castiel remove his powers so he is no longer a threat even though it leaves him in a mentally damaged state. In flashbacks, Sam meets Amelia's father who is initially cold towards him, but eventually warms up to him just in time for Amelia to learn that her husband is still alive.
158	9	"Citizen Fang"	Nick Copus	Daniel Loflin	December 5, 2012	3X7809	2.06
Sam had Martin track Benny and he suspects Benny has killed a human, prompting him to call Sam and Dean. Benny tells Dean that it's a vampire named Desmond who has killed the people and framed Benny. Sam gets a distress text from Amelia and takes off for Texas to find her. Benny's story is proven to be true when Desmond attacks and nearly kills Dean, but Benny saves Dean and kills Desmond. In flashbacks, Sam is shown leaving Amelia to give her a chance with her husband Don. Upon returning to Texas, he finds Amelia fine and living with her husband and realizes that Dean tricked him to get him out of the way, a realization that greatly upsets him. Martin goes back and threatens to kill Benny's great-grand daughter, forcing Benny to kill Martin. Dean finds out about this.
159	10	"Torn and Frayed"	Robert Singer	Jenny Klein	January 16, 2013	3X7810	1.99
Sam forces Dean to choose between Benny or him. Sam and Amelia put their relationship to the test. Castiel asks Dean's help in rescuing the angel Samandriel, who is being held captive by Crowley's forces in Geneva, Nebraska. The torture forces Samandriel to reveal secrets to the demons. As they are outnumbered, Castiel goes against Dean's wishes by bringing in a reluctant Sam to help. The group assaults Crowley's base and rescues Samandriel, who has revealed to Crowley that there is a tablet about angels. During the rescue, Castiel has flashbacks of Naomi torturing him while hearing Samandriel's cries. Naomi orders Castiel to kill Samandriel, forcing him to do so. Sam decides to not renew his relationship with Amelia and Dean likewise cuts off future contact with Benny. The brothers re-commit themselves to each other and their mission to seal the gates of Hell.
160	11	"LARP and the Real Girl"	Jeannot Szwarc	Robbie Thompson	January 23, 2013	3X7811	2.01
Sam and Dean investigate the mysterious deaths of two live action role players in Farmington Hills, Michigan, who were playing a game entitled Moondoor. They link the murders to a mysterious Celtic symbol that magically appears on the victim's wrist. Group leader Charlie Bradbury is taken by the killer, a fairy named Gilda, who is being forced to harm people against her will. Jerry, another member of the group, put Gilda under his control and had her kill his "enemies" so he could win Charlie's heart, not knowing that she is a lesbian. Charlie destroys his spell-book. Now free from Jerry's control, Gilda takes him to face punishment from her people. Charlie decides to stop running and remain in the life she has built for herself. She also offers Sam and Dean her help if they ever need it.
161	12	"As Time Goes By"	Serge Ladouceur	Adam Glass	January 30, 2013	3X7812	2.12
In 1958, Sam and Dean's grandfather Henry Winchester is given a mysterious box to protect from the Knight of hell Abaddon. Henry uses a spell to travel forward in time and arrives in Sam and Dean's motel room in the present, demanding to see John Winchester. Henry explains that the family are members of a secret order known as the Men of Letters, who record and guard supernatural secrets. Sam learns from the only surviving member of the order that the box contains a key to the greatest storehouse of supernatural knowledge ever known. Abaddon kills the surviving Man of Letters and takes Sam hostage, forcing Dean to do a trade: the key and Henry for Sam. Henry shoots her in the head with a bullet engraved with a devil's trap, thus binding her in place and within her body. Unable to kill Abaddon, Dean instead dismembers her and buries the pieces to keep her incapacitated indefinitely. Henry dies in his grandsons' arms. They bury him near his dead friends from the order.
162	13	"Everybody Hates Hitler"	Phil Sgriccia	Ben Edlund	February 6, 2013	3X7814	2.29
In 1944, a group of Nazis were decimated by a golem except for one who casts a spell to be teleported away. Sam and Dean find the abandoned storehouse of the Men of Letters in Lebanon, Kansas. After two weeks there, they investigate the death of Rabbi Isaac Bass in Wilkes-Barre, Pennsylvania. The rabbi was a member of the Judah Initiative, a secret order of rabbis during World War II who fought against a group of Nazi necromancers called the Thule Society. They run into Rabbi Bass' grandson Aaron who currently owns the golem while trying to get it to work. Modern members of the Thule are searching for the Red Ledger, a logbook of their predecessors' successful experiments. Aaron, Sam, and Dean work together to defeat the Thule. With what he has learned, Aaron finally gets control over the golem. Sam catalogs the Red Ledger and takes on the duties of a Man of Letters.
163	14	"Trial and Error"	Kevin Parks	Andrew Dabb	February 13, 2013	3X7813	2.41
Kevin Tran discovers that in order to close the gates of Hell, someone must complete three trials. The first trial is to kill a hellhound, bathe in its blood, and recite a spell. Deciding to track down a hellhound, Sam identifies the Cassity family in Shoshone, Idaho, who, ten years ago, struck oil where there should be none, indicating they made a deal with a Crossroads Demon. At the Cassity farm, Sam and Dean take jobs, while keeping an eye on the family, with the intent of killing the hellhound sent to collect the person's soul. The hellhounds kill two members of the family under their watch. While Dean tries to find the hellhound, Sam focuses on finding which one of the remaining bickering family members made another deal. Dean learns that the ranch manager Ellie made a deal to save her mother from Parkinson's disease when she was 15. Dean battles the hellhound when it goes after Ellie, but when he fails, Sam kills it and is coated in its blood, making him the one to complete the trials.
164	15	"Man's Best Friend with Benefits"	John F. Showalter	Brad Buckner & Eugenie Ross-Leming	February 20, 2013	3X7815	2.10
Sam and Dean receive a text from James Frampton, a cop who helped them on a previous case, asking for their help. Traveling to St. Louis, Missouri, they learn that James has become a witch since they last met and is using magic to solve cases. James' familiar, Portia, reveals that she sent the text and stating that James is having dreams of killing people who later die. Dean finds a spell in Bobby's notes that a witch could be using to implant false memories in James' mind. The boys become suspicious of the police detective investigating the case. Detective Ed Stoltz has a grudge against James and is building a case against him using the familiar of another witch as a witness. Sam and Dean kill the witch with a spell from Bobby's notes. James and Portia decide to leave town and start a new life together, rather than fight the case building against him.
165	16	"Remember the Titans"	Steve Boyum	Daniel Loflin	February 27, 2013	3X7816	2.13
In Great Falls, Montana, Sam and Dean meet Shane, a man who has died and come back to life every day for the last seven years after being trapped in an avalanche. Shane is really the Greek Titan Prometheus, who is cursed to die every day as punishment from Zeus for giving mankind back the gift of fire. A young woman, named Hayley, shows up with Prometheus' son, Oliver, who has the same curse. In order to free both, Sam and Dean summon Zeus. Zeus tricks Hayley into freeing him from the trap and then proceeds to torture Prometheus. Sam and Dean convince the goddess Artemis to intervene, as she is secretly in love with Prometheus. Artemis tries to shoot her father with one of her arrows, which can kill a god. Zeus uses Prometheus as a shield, but Prometheus pushes the arrow through himself and into Zeus, killing him. Prometheus dies permanently while Artemis takes her leave. With Zeus dead, the curse on Oliver is broken.
166	17	"Goodbye Stranger"	Thomas J. Wright	Robbie Thompson	March 20, 2013	3X7817	2.16
Sam and Dean find a case where people die of having their eyes burned out and organs liquefied while digging for something. They find out that Castiel is the one killing the people, under heavenly orders in an attempt to find the Word of God tablet. The trio finds and rescues Meg, who knows where the crypts are, from Crowley. Meg brings Sam, Dean, and Castiel to the right crypt and later sacrifices herself to hold Crowley off. Dean and Castiel find the tablet in the crypt. Resisting his orders to kill Dean, Castiel breaks free and leaves with the tablet to keep it safe from everyone.
167	18	"Freaks and Geeks"	John F. Showalter	Adam Glass	March 27, 2013	3X7818	2.23
Sam and Dean encounter a team of vampire hunters composed of orphan kids. The kids (Krissy, Aidan, and Josephine) live under the protection of an adult hunter named Victor who is training them to hunt the vampires who killed their parents. Dean finds the vampire who supposedly killed Krissy's father, but he has been turned too recently. Sam and Dean realize that Victor has been trying to create the next generation of hunters by hiring a vampire to kill their families and turn people so they can get "revenge." Krissy takes down the vampire with dead man's blood and Victor kills himself when he realizes that he is going to be left alone. Using the vampire's blood, the group is able to turn the last victim back to human. The kids decide to stay together and be hunters, protecting the town they live in, but not actively seeking out threats. This only increases Dean's determination to close the gates of Hell.
168	19	"Taxi Driver"	Guy Norman Bee	Eugenie Ross-Leming & Brad Buckner	April 3, 2013	3X7819	1.90
Sam heads to Hell on a mission to rescue Bobby, who has been taken there on Crowley's orders. Dean deals with an unnerved Kevin, who has deciphered the second trial: to free an innocent soul from Hell and release it into Heaven. Sam manages to rescue Bobby, but the two get stranded in Purgatory. Benny rescues Sam and Bobby from vampires in Purgatory, but stays behind to hold off some more as they escape. Sam releases Bobby's soul into Heaven, completing the second trial. Crowley captures Kevin and all of his notes on the tablet, leaving Sam and Dean with no clues on the third trial.
169	20	"Pac-Man Fever"	Robert Singer	Robbie Thompson	April 24, 2013	3X7820	2.38
Charlie brings Sam and Dean a case in Topeka, Kansas, where two victim's insides have been liquefied. By the time they arrive on scene, the coroner has already cremated the bodies. Charlie is captured and put into a fear-induced dream by the coroner, who is really the monster, a "bastard offshoot" of a djinn. They locate Charlie and kill the coroner, but are unable to free her from the Djinn's poison, so Dean enters Charlie's dreams to break her out. Dean finds her trapped in a nightmare of a video game she stole and sold as a kid, where she must endlessly defend her mother from super-soldier vampires. Dean realizes that Charlie's fear is of losing her mother; he gets her to realize that her mother is long gone and to let go. Once she does, she returns to the waking world where Sam has killed a second Djinn, the coroner's son and the true culprit behind the deaths.
170	21	"The Great Escapist"	Robert Duncan McNeill	Ben Edlund	May 1, 2013	3X7821	2.07
Held captive by Crowley, Kevin sending Sam and Dean all of his notes on the Word of God tablet. A symbol in the notes points to a Native American tribe in Colorado and possibly connected to Metatron. Sam and Dean try to convince Metatron to help them find the third trial. Metatron rescues Kevin and they reveal the third trial: to cure a demon. A subplot deals with Castiel teleporting between Biggerson's restaurants in an attempt to hide from the angels. He ends up on the road in front of Sam and Dean, badly injured and asks for their help.
171	22	"Clip Show"	Thomas J. Wright	Andrew Dabb	May 8, 2013	3X7822	2.07
While Sam and Dean try to figure out how to cure a demon, Crowley tells them that unless they surrender the demon tablet and stop the trials, he will kill everyone they have ever saved. Despite this, Dean is determined to continue despite them having no demon to cure. Metatron tells Castiel that Heaven is in chaos and he wants to seal it up to prevent the war from spreading to Earth. He suggests Castiel do the three trials needed to seal Heaven, the first of which requires killing a nephilim, the offspring of a human and an angel. Castiel is reluctant at first, but when the nephilim fights back against them, Castiel kills her to protect Metatron.
172	23	"Sacrifice"	Phil Sgriccia	Jeremy Carver	May 15, 2013	3X7823	2.31
Sam and Dean capture Crowley so they can use him for the third trial. Castiel enlists Dean's help in completing the second Heavenly trial by retrieving the bow of a cherub. Crowley uses a blood spell to call upon other demons for help, only for Abaddon to answer his summons by trying to kill them both so that she can overthrow Crowley and rule Hell herself. Sam forces her to retreat by engulfing her in holy fire, and a tearful Crowley begins showing signs of becoming cured. Naomi tells Dean and Castiel that the "Heavenly trials" are fake. Metatron is tricking Castiel into performing a spell that will expel all angels from Heaven. She tells Dean that completing the demon trials will kill Sam. Metatron kills Naomi and takes Castiel hostage. Finding that Sam is willing to die to atone for how often he has let his brother down, Dean talks Sam out of finishing the trials. Metatron completes his spell and sends the now-human Castiel back to Earth. Sam, Dean, Castiel, and Crowley look up into the night sky as thousands of angels begin to fall.

== Production ==
It was announced on April 4, 2012, that showrunner Sera Gamble was leaving the show to work on developing other projects. Jeremy Carver, a longtime writer on the series, took over as showrunner for the eighth season. On May 3, 2012, The CW officially renewed Supernatural for an eighth season. It aired on Wednesdays at 9:00 pm on the CW. Series star Jensen Ackles directed the first episode to be produced for this season but the third to air. "Trial and Error" was the thirteenth episode to be produced this season but the fourteenth to air.

=== Casting ===
Ty Olsson was cast as Benny, a dark and dangerous vampire who helps Ackles' character Dean Winchester escape from Purgatory, where he ended up at the end of the seventh season. Olsson previously appeared in Supernatural as the vampire Eli in the second season episode "Bloodlust". Liane Balaban was cast as Amelia, a love interest to Jared Padalecki's character Sam Winchester. Amanda Tapping appears in seven episodes as the angel Naomi, described as being different from any other angel to have appeared in the series so far. Even though Khaira Ledeyo played the role of Kevin's mother in the seventh season, Lauren Tom was cast in the role for season eight. DJ Qualls returned as the hunter Garth in "Southern Comfort". Felicia Day returned as hacker Charlie Bradbury in "LARP and the Real Girl" and "Pac-Man Fever". Jon Gries returned as Martin Creaser, a hunter and old friend of the Winchesters, in "Citizen Fang", he previously appeared in the fifth season episode "Sam, Interrupted". Jim Beaver reprised his role as Bobby Singer in "Taxi Driver".

=== Writing ===
"Why use flashbacks? Because fans usually hate it when the brothers are separated, so that's why they're being reunited quickly."

— Robert Singer.

The season features two flashback stories in parallel to the episode's main story, one showing Sam's relationship with Amelia and another showing Dean's time in Purgatory. Originally, series creator Eric Kripke planned only five seasons, but Carver drew up a plan which would carry the series through a total of ten seasons. Executive producer Robert Singer described the inspiration for the season as "Raiders of the Lost Ark".

== Reception ==
Critical reception to the season was mixed to positive. The review aggregator website Rotten Tomatoes reported a 67% approval rating, with an average rating of 7.4/10 based on 9 reviews.

Diana Steenbergen of IGN gave the eighth season an 8.5 out of 10 and called it an improvement over the seventh season, writing, "What we got was a solid season-long mythology storyline, some great supporting characters, and of course, a lot of the always reliable backbone of the show – Sam and Dean Winchester." She commented positively about the return of the demons/angels storyline and addition of new recurring characters such as Benny, Naomi, and Metatron, but criticized Sam's "regular life" storyline that got "fizzled" and dropping the tablet trials at the last minute.
