= Meet the New Boss (Supernatural) =

- Supernatural episode
- Episode no.: Season 7 Episode 1
- Directed by: Phil Sgriccia
- Written by: Sera Gamble
- Cinematography by: Serge Ladouceur
- Editing by: Anthony Pinker
- Production code: 3X7052
- Original air date: September 23, 2011
- Running time: 41 minutes

Guest appearances
- Misha Collins as Castiel (special guest star); Jim Beaver as Bobby Singer; Mark A. Sheppard as Crowley; Julian Richings as Death; Mark Pellegrino as Lucifer

Episode chronology
← Previous "The Man Who Knew Too Much"	Next → "Hello, Cruel World"
- Supernatural season 7

"Meet the New Boss" is the first episode of the paranormal drama television series Supernatural's season 7, and the 127th overall. The episode was written by showrunner Sera Gamble and directed by executive producer Phil Sgriccia. It was first broadcast on September 23, 2011 on The CW. In the episode, Castiel decides to go fix the world's problems as their new "God". However, he is being taunted by new evil forces known as the Leviathans. Meanwhile, Sam is now having hallucinations about his time in Lucifer's Cage.

== Plot ==
Picking up exactly where the season 6 finale finished, Castiel (Misha Collins) proclaims himself to be the new God and tells Sam (Jared Padalecki), Dean (Jensen Ackles) and Bobby Singer (Jim Beaver) to bow and profess their love for him or be killed. When he sees that they only do it out of fear, he leaves to fix wrongs in the world. Sam begins to suffer hallucinations due to the torture he endured in Lucifer's Cage.

Castiel goes to Heaven and kills all the angels that sided with Raphael, before starting to chastise false preachers and hear voices in his head. He goes to Crowley (Mark A. Sheppard) to make a trade, he will receive souls and he will reinstate Crowley's position as King of Hell. Seeing he can't refuse, Crowley accepts. In an attempt to stop Castiel, the Winchesters and Bobby summon Crowley to give them information to attempt to bind Death (Julian Richings) so he can kill Castiel.

The ritual takes place and Death is bound. Castiel then appears, ready to kill them for their betrayal. Death then explains to Castiel that he consumed the Leviathans from the Purgatory, the first beasts created by God but locked in Purgatory as they were a threat to humanity. Castiel then disappears and while trying to punish a senator, the entities make him kill her entire staff. Death decides to help them stop Castiel, stating he will cause an eclipse to open a door to Purgatory so the souls can return.

Realizing his powers are beyond his control, Castiel goes to Sam and Dean for help. While alone, Sam is taunted by Lucifer (Mark Pellegrino), who tries to convince Sam that he never left the Cage and he's currently giving him false hope through mental torture. Dean and Bobby open the door to the Purgatory as Castiel lets out the souls. Once the door closes, Castiel returns to normal, but the Leviathans are revealed to have remained inside his body. Castiel, now possessed by the Leviathans, attacks Dean and says, "this is going to be so much fun".

== Reception ==
=== Viewers ===
The episode was watched by 2.01 million viewers with a 0.8/3 share among adults aged 18 to 49. This was a 5% decrease in viewership from the previous episode, which was watched by 2.11 million viewers and it was also a 31% decrease from the previous season premiere, which was watched by 2.90 million viewers.

=== Critical reviews ===
Professional ratings
Review scores
Source	Rating
IGN	8.5
The A.V. Club	B+
TV Fanatic	5.0/5.0 stars

"Meet the New Boss" received generally positive reviews. Diana Steenbergen of IGN gave the episode a "great" 8.5 out of 10 and wrote, "I needn't have worried. 'Meet the New Boss' was far more entertaining than expected and that is tough to pull off for a show entering its seventh season. If the rest of the season can continue the way it started, then we are in for a good year."

Zack Handlen of The A.V. Club gave the episode a "B+" and wrote, "Seven years is long in the tooth indeed, and what's really cool is how well Supernatural is holding up. Eric Kripke, the series' creator, left after season five, and while last year showed definite signs of wobbling, it wasn't the sort of season you get from a show that's creatively dead. And as premieres go, 'New Boss' isn't bad at all. It's a little abrupt in some ways, which has me worried the season will burn through plot too quickly (that sounds silly; given how long Supernatural has been on the air, the writers should have some idea how to pace things, but one of last season's big frustrations was a lot of aimless wandering), but we do get an idea of some of the big problems the Winchesters and their surrogate father Bobby will have to deal with down the road. The episode hit many of the expected beats, from Sam and Dean bickering to magic spell recipes to The Car rising slowly from the dead. In some places, it was maybe a little too familiar, but it's good to have these guys back on my television."

Sandra Gonzalez of EW stated: "Monsters are nothing special on Supernatural. Over six seasons, we've encountered the ugliest uglies, the baddest baddies and, let's face it, some really disgusting things. But last night's premiere chilled me to the bone like no episode ever has."

Sean McKenna from TV Fanatic, gave a perfect 5 star rating out of 5, stating: "Overall, it was a fantastic start to the season that already has the wheels of the show off to a speedy start. Glad to see that even with seven years under the belt, Supernatural remains fresh, exciting, and destined for big things."
