= Supernatural season 6 =

Supernatural
- Season 6
- DVD cover art
- Showrunner: Sera Gamble
- Starring: Jared Padalecki; Jensen Ackles; Misha Collins
- No. of episodes: 22

Release
- Original network: The CW
- Original release: September 24, 2010 – May 20, 2011

Season chronology
- ← Previous; Season 5 Next → Season 7

The sixth season of Supernatural, an American dark fantasy television series created by Eric Kripke, premiered September 24, 2010, and concluded May 20, 2011, airing 22 episodes. This is the first season to have Sera Gamble as showrunner after the full-time departure of Kripke. The sixth season had an average viewership of 2.27 million U.S. viewers.

The season begins a year after the happenings of the previous season finale with Dean Winchester (Jensen Ackles) living a happy and normal life. Mysteriously, Sam Winchester (Jared Padalecki) is freed from Lucifer's cage in Hell and teams up with Dean, who leaves his new life behind and becomes a hunter again.

In the United States the season aired on Fridays at 9:00 pm (ET) on The CW television network. Special guest stars in this season included Brian Doyle-Murray and Robert Englund.

== Cast ==
=== Starring ===
- Jared Padalecki as Sam Winchester
- Jensen Ackles as Dean Winchester
- Misha Collins as Castiel (Note: Only credited for his respective episode appearances.)

=== Special guest stars ===
- Robert Englund as Dr. Robert
- Brian Doyle-Murray as Robert Singer

=== Guest stars ===
- Jim Beaver as Bobby Singer
- Mark A. Sheppard as Crowley
- Mitch Pileggi as Samuel Campbell
- Cindy Sampson as Lisa Braeden
- Sebastian Roché as Balthazar
- Nicholas Elia as Ben Braeden
- Jessica Heafey as Gwen Campbell
- Corin Nemec as Christian Campbell
- Julia Maxwell and Samantha Smith as Eve
- Kim Johnston Ulrich as Dr. Eleanor Visyak
- Demore Barnes and Lanette Ware as Raphael
- Laura Mennell as Brigitta
- David Paetkau as Mark Campbell
- Sonya Salomaa as Rachel
- Steven Williams as Rufus Turner
- Rick Worthy as Alpha Vampire
- Genevieve Padalecki as Herself
- Micah A. Hauptman as Eric Kripke
- Amber Benson as Lenore
- Samantha Ferris as Ellen Harvelle
- Fredric Lehne as Azazel
- Lindsey McKeon as Tessa
- Rachel Miner as Meg Masters
- Kim Rhodes as Sheriff Jody Mills
- Julian Richings as Death

== Episodes ==
The number in the first column represents the episode's number overall, whereas the number in the second column indicates the episode's number within this particular season (6). "U.S. viewers in millions" refers to how many Americans who watched the episode live or on the day of broadcast.

No. overall	No. in season	Title	Directed by	Written by	Original release date	Prod. code	U.S. viewers (millions)
105	1	"Exile on Main St."	Phil Sgriccia	Sera Gamble	September 24, 2010	3X6052	2.90
Dean Winchester lives with Lisa Braedon and her son Ben, and has given up hunting for a year after his brother Sam jumped into Lucifer's Cage. Mysterious occurrences appear in Dean's neighborhood and he is forced back into the world of the supernatural. Sam rescues Dean and reveals that he was mysteriously returned from Hell around the time Dean started living with Lisa. Sam then introduces Dean to family members he never even knew existed: the Campbells; his mother's cousins, hunters led by none other than their grandfather Samuel who was also mysteriously returned to earth one year ago. Dean leaves Lisa and Ben with Bobby so he and Sam can kill the Djinn tormenting the people close to Dean. Unbeknownst to Sam and Dean, Samuel captures one of the Djinn during the fight. In the end Dean decides to live with Lisa and Ben, and tells Sam to keep in touch.
106	2	"Two and a Half Men"	John F. Showalter	Adam Glass	October 1, 2010	3X6053	2.33
Sam investigates a case about missing babies whose parents are being mysteriously murdered. At one of the crime scenes, he discovers a baby that was left behind and calls Dean for help. Reluctant to leave Lisa and Ben, Dean finally agrees to meet Sam and surprises his brother with how parental he has become. The brothers take the baby (revealed to be a shape-shifter) to Samuel, who decides to raise it as a hunter, which infuriates Dean. However, before they can decide the baby's future, a shape-shifter breaks in and kidnaps the baby. The shape-shifter was apparently the father of all shape-shifters (the alpha), and was much stronger than the others. Samuel secretly talks to someone on the phone promising he'll capture the alpha. After losing the baby, Dean returns to Lisa and tells her that he is not sure whether he should stay to protect her and Ben or go to make sure nothing happens to them. Lisa tells Dean to leave and just come back home whenever he can.
107	3	"The Third Man"	Robert Singer	Ben Edlund	October 8, 2010	3X6054	2.16
Several police officers seem to have been killed by the plagues of Egypt. Castiel confirms the staff of Moses was used to kill the cops. Castiel, Sam, and Dean find that the officers were involved in the shooting of a young man, whose brother Aaron has the staff, which he got from an angel in exchange for his soul. Castiel deduces that the angel responsible, Balthazar, has split the staff into pieces to be able to buy more souls. Castiel confronts Balthazar in his residence. Raphael arrives and Balthazar leaves Castiel to deal with the mess. Before Raphael can kill Castiel, Balthazar returns and uses what appears to be a white crystal to disintegrate Raphael's host into salt. Dean uses holy fire to trap Balthazar and force him to return Aaron's soul, but Castiel releases him. Both angels then depart with no explanation to the brothers.
108	4	"Weekend at Bobby's"	Jensen Ackles	Andrew Dabb & Daniel Loflin	October 15, 2010	3X6051	2.84
After unsuccessfully negotiating for the return of his soul, Bobby begins to research Crowley's origins. He also helps fellow hunter Rufus bury a Japanese okami demon and contends with an FBI agent who is trying to find Rufus. Dean tells Bobby about Sam's changes and his problems, but Bobby reminds Dean he can't always be there for them. Bobby learns that Crowley's real name is Fergus McLeod and he is the King of Hell. Bobby calls up Crowley's long deceased son Gavin for information, then summons Crowley to threaten him to return his soul. Crowley remains unmoved until Dean and Sam call to reveal that they are at his grave in Scotland, ready to burn his bones. Crowley reluctantly returns Bobby's soul and destroys the contract, then goes to Scotland to pick up his remains.
109	5	"Live Free or Twihard"	Rod Hardy	Brett Matthews	October 22, 2010	3X6056	2.47
Sam and Dean investigate a series of missing girls in Limestone, Illinois, all of whom were Twilight fans. They realize the girls are being preyed upon by vampires and stake out a local bar to find the culprits. While there, Dean is turned by a vampire named Boris while Sam watches and lets it happen. Samuel tells Dean that the cure requires Boris' blood for it to work. Dean tracks down the nest, where Boris reveals that the vampires are building an army under the orders of their "father", the Alpha Vampire. Dean is confronted by the entire nest and kills them all single-handedly. Sam and Samuel track Dean down and cure him, but Dean realizes that Sam left him to be turned and he becomes suspicious of his brother.
110	6	"You Can't Handle the Truth"	Jan Eliasberg	Story by : David Reed & Eric Charmelo & Nicole Snyder; Teleplay by : Eric Charmelo & Nicole Snyder	October 29, 2010	3X6055	2.52
Dean and Sam investigate a series of suicides in Calumet City, Illinois. Each of the victims killed themselves shortly after a loved one felt compelled to tell them unpleasant truths. When various women begin baring their souls to Dean, he realizes he is also under the spell. Dean takes advantage of the situation to question Sam about the vampire attack, but Sam says he just froze and is appalled Dean doesn't trust him. They discover the spell is being spread by the goddess of truth, Veritas, who is disguised as a local investigative reporter. When the brothers track Veritas to her lair, she takes them captive. Veritas is shocked to see that Sam is unaffected by her spell and has been lying to Dean all along. The brothers break free and kill her. Sam admits he allowed Dean to get turned. The episode ends on a tense note as Dean beats Sam unconscious.
111	7	"Family Matters"	Guy Bee	Andrew Dabb & Daniel Loflin	November 5, 2010	3X6057	2.46
Dean enlists Castiel's help to find out what's wrong with Sam, who reveals he can't sleep or feel any emotions except for physical pain. Castiel discovers Sam's soul is missing, and he leaves to investigate. They go to Samuel's place, and Castiel finds that Samuel has his soul, unlike Sam. Meanwhile, the Winchesters learn that Samuel plans to hunt down the Alpha vampire. After the raid, Dean sees the group load the captured Alpha onto a vehicle. He asks Samuel about the Alpha, and he says that they burned him. Sam confesses it was his idea not to inform Dean about the Alpha, as he believes Dean is of the type "shoot first, ask questions later". The brothers agree to work together to find out where the Alpha is and discover the place where the Alpha is kept in captivity. The Alpha tells them that Samuel wants to find out where the purgatory is. They are found out by Samuel and the group, and the Alpha escapes while Samuel confronts Sam and Dean. The Alpha is eventually caught by demons, and they take him away (It is revealed that except the niece of Samuel others were possessed by a demon all along). Crowley comes and reveals that Samuel works for him, collecting alpha creatures in order to find out where the purgatory is for himself, and that he is the one who brought both Sam and Samuel back, as being the new king of hell has granted him the power to do so. Crowley tells them that he calls the shots and they have no choice but to follow his orders. After the demon leaves, Sam wants to kill Samuel for betraying and lying to them, but Dean lets him go. Samuel tells them that he only works to capture creatures and has no intention to harm the brothers. Sam assures Dean that Crowley will get what he deserves when they get the chance.
112	8	"All Dogs Go to Heaven"	Phil Sgriccia	Adam Glass	November 12, 2010	3X6058	2.09
Crowley offers the brothers a deal: an alpha in exchange for Sam's soul. He then sends the brothers to investigate an apparent werewolf attack in Buffalo, New York. The two brothers arrive at a scene of another murder and learn that the second victim was murdered in the same way as the first. After some research, Sam discovers local man Cal Garrigan knew both victims. They interview Cal and meet his girlfriend Mandy, Mandy's son Aiden, and their dog Lucky. When Sam sees Lucky transform into a man, they realize the killers are not werewolves but skin-walkers. Sam and Dean convince Lucky that it would be better to give up his pack than to risk the family he loves. Lucky tells the two that the skin-walkers plan to infiltrate families as pet dogs and turn the families into skin-walkers. Dean convinces Lucky to set up a meeting with the alpha. During the resulting shootout, all the skin-walkers except for Lucky are killed.
113	9	"Clap Your Hands If You Believe..."	John F. Showalter	Ben Edlund	November 19, 2010	3X6059	1.94
The Winchester brothers investigate a series of alien abductions in Elwood, Indiana. They question the first victim's father, a watchmaker, who insists his son will never return. Sam goes to a UFO gathering to learn more. Dean is apparently abducted; afterward, he is followed by a strange man only he can see, encounters a Tinkerbell-like fairy, and finds elves working inside Brennan's shop. Brennan tells Sam that he made a deal with a leprechaun: the elves will save his shop and reputation, but will take his first-born in exchange. Sam and Brennan attempt to undo the spell but Brennan is killed by the leprechaun, who turns out to be the UFO enthusiast Sam spoke to earlier. He used the faked UFO sightings to cover for the leprechauns' activities. The leprechaun offers to get Sam his soul back, but Sam declines and attacks him. Sam wins by spilling salt onto the floor, which forces the leprechaun to count each grain, giving Sam time to cast the spell which will send the leprechauns back to the fairy realm.
114	10	"Caged Heat"	Robert Singer	Story by : Jenny Klein and Brett Matthews; Teleplay by : Brett Matthews	December 3, 2010	3X6060	2.15
Sam and Dean are ambushed by Meg the demon and some of her followers. They make a bargain: Meg will get to kill Crowley if she can recover Sam's soul. Samuel tells the brothers and Castiel about a hidden monster prison Crowley is running, torturing creatures for information on Purgatory. While attempting to infiltrate the compound, Meg's demons are killed by a hellhound and Meg fights the creatures to buy the others time. Samuel has betrayed the brothers, forcing Castiel out of the building and trapping the boys. Sam escapes, rescues Dean, then the group tricks Crowley into admitting that getting the soul would be impossible, even for him. Castiel reappears with Crowley's remains in tow and sets the bones ablaze, killing Crowley. Meg vanishes and Castiel leaves to fight a losing war against Raphael. Sam decides that he is better off without his soul.
115	11	"Appointment in Samarra"	Mike Rohl	Sera Gamble & Robert Singer	December 10, 2010	3X6061	2.27
Dean makes a deal with Death: if Dean will take Death's place for a day, Death will return Sam's soul. While acting as Death, Dean refuses to reap a 12-year-old girl with a heart condition and the girl makes a miraculous recovery. Due to the change in the 'natural order', others die instead and Dean is forced to take the girl. Sam summons Balthazar to learn how to prevent his soul from returning to his body. Balthazar says the spell requires the "blood of the father". Sam attempts to chase down and kill Bobby, the closest thing to a father he has. Dean realizes that Death's game was rigged. Death says he will still retrieve Sam's soul as Dean has learned a lesson about the natural order of things. Death then pushes the soul into a screaming and pained Sam.
116	12	"Like a Virgin"	Phil Sgriccia	Adam Glass	February 4, 2011	3X6062	2.25
Sam awakens back to his normal state only to have no stable memory of when he was around with no soul. Dean and Sam investigate some disappearances of virgin girls in Portland, Oregon only to find that dragons are behind the kidnappings. Bobby sends Dean to Dr. Ellie Visyak, a professor in medieval mythology who has had experience in fighting dragons. She tells Dean that in order to kill the dragons, he needs a dragon-killing sword, one of which she has in her basement. Sam and Dean infiltrate the dragons' hideout and manage to kill one of the dragons, while the other one escapes. Back at Bobby's, Sam tells Dean that Castiel told him about everything he did while he had no soul. Sam apologizes for his behavior. Meanwhile, the dragons still have one of the virgins; they work an incantation and shove her into a fiery pit. The virgin then flies out of the pit possessed by the "Mother of All".
117	13	"Unforgiven"	David Barrett	Andrew Dabb & Daniel Loflin	February 11, 2011	3X6063	1.97
Sam gets a mysterious text message directing him to the town of Bristol, Rhode Island where three women have gone missing in the past week. As they investigate, Sam realizes that he and Samuel had originally hunted an Arachne in the town, using Sheriff Dobbs as bait to lure in the creature. Sam had killed the Arachne and also the abducted men, as he believed that they were beyond help. The boys discover the Arachne had not captured the men to feed, but to propagate the species, turning Dobbs and the other victims into Arachnes as well, all of whom survived. Dobbs reveals himself by baiting Sam and Dean, and trapping them in webbing. Dean uses a shard of glass to cut the webbing and attack Dobbs. Brenna frees Sam, who decapitates Dobbs. Sam then tries to apologize to Brenna, but she does not wait to hear him. The episode ends with Sam gripped in a flashback of his time in Hell and unable to respond to Dean.
118	14	"Mannequin 3: The Reckoning"	Jeannot Szwarc	Eric Charmelo & Nicole Snyder	February 18, 2011	3X6064	2.25
Sam and Dean investigate a case in Paterson, New Jersey where a janitor was killed with no one around. After another murder takes place in another town, they notice both murder scenes had mannequins nearby. Ben calls Dean, telling him Lisa is acting strange, and Dean goes to see what is going on. Dean realizes that Lisa still has feelings for him and Ben wants Dean back in their lives. Sam discovers that both victims used to work together in a local factory and the janitor resigned after the strange death of a female worker, Rose. After Sam saves another factory worker from the ghost, the man admits that he and several of his coworkers played a cruel joke on Rose, which accidentally resulted in her death. Sam burns Rose's bones, but Rose returns to kill the worker that same night. Sam discovers Rose gave her sister a kidney when they were younger, meaning Rose's remains still exist inside Isabelle. Rose possesses the Impala and tries to kill Dean, resulting in the Impala crashing which leads to a glass shard accidentally piercing the kidney of Rose's sister and both sisters finally dying.
119	15	"The French Mistake"	Charles Beeson	Ben Edlund	February 25, 2011	3X6065	2.18
After giving them a mysterious key, Balthazar sends the brothers to an alternate reality, where they are called actors named "Jared Padalecki" and "Jensen Ackles" who actually "play" Sam and Dean in a television show that follows their lives. Sam and Dean attempt to return to their reality, but are hampered by their actors' lives and by the crew of their TV show. One of Raphael's assassins arrives to kill them and slaughters most of the TV crew, but the brothers beat him because he has lost all his powers in this reality. Sam and Dean are then pulled back into their own universe by Raphael. Balthazar and Castiel reveal that the key was a ruse to divert Raphael's attention from the real transaction: Castiel now owns the weapons of Heaven that Balthazar stole. The brothers are frustrated with Castiel's using them as a decoy. Castiel only says that he will tell them more later.
120	16	"...And Then There Were None"	Mike Rohl	Brett Matthews	March 4, 2011	3X6066	2.14
Eve causes a spike of monster activity in Sandusky, Ohio. Dean, Sam, and Bobby partner up with Bobby's old friend Rufus to track her down. They encounter Samuel and Gwen Campbell, also on the hunt. Eve sends a worm-like monster after them. The worm infects Dean, who kills Gwen while under its control. The worm leaves Dean and infects Samuel, turning him violent and prompting Sam to kill him. The corpse attacks Bobby and Rufus when they try to open up Samuel's head to get the worm, but when the corpse is electrocuted, the worm flees. Sam, Dean, Bobby, and Rufus all agree to electrocute each other to find out who is now infected with the worm. Eventually, it is revealed that Bobby is the infected, and he kills Rufus. The brothers tie Bobby up and electrocute him until the worm dies. The episode closes with the three remaining hunters burying Rufus and honoring his memory.
121	17	"My Heart Will Go On"	Phil Sgriccia	Eric Charmelo & Nicole Snyder	April 15, 2011	3X6068	2.26
Sam and Dean follow up a new case in Chester, Pennsylvania, where people are dying in freak accidents. Ellen Harvelle, inexplicably alive and married to Bobby, discovers the victims' ancestors all immigrated to the United States in 1912 on the Titanic, a ship none of them have ever heard of that narrowly missed an iceberg on its maiden voyage. It is ultimately revealed that Castiel had given Balthazar the order to go back in time and save the Titanic from ever having sunk, creating a chain reaction in which more souls are produced to fuel Castiel's side's power in the Heavenly civil war. One of the side-effects of the chain reaction is that Ellen and her daughter Jo never died. It transpires that Atropos of the three sisters of Fate is responsible for the freak accidents, as she is trying to kill all the descendants of the Titanic survivors who now exist but shouldn't. To protect Sam and Dean from the wrath of Atropos, Castiel is forced to undo the timeline.
122	18	"Frontierland"	Guy Bee	Story by : Andrew Dabb & Daniel Loflin & Jackson Stewart; Teleplay by : Andrew Dabb & Daniel Loflin	April 22, 2011	3X6067	1.90
Bobby discovers that ashes from a phoenix can kill Eve. Dean finds Samuel Colt's diary, where he claims to have killed a phoenix in Sunrise, Wyoming in 1861. Castiel sends them back in time. In 1861, the brothers witness the hanging of Elias Finch, who informs the judge, the sheriff and the deputy that they are all going to burn. Finch reappears to burn the judge and sheriff to death, and Dean is proclaimed as the new town sheriff. Sam finds Colt and tries to convince Colt to help him kill Elias, who is in fact the phoenix. Meanwhile, Castiel is seriously injured by Rachel. He tells Bobby he can only regain his power by touching a human soul, when Bobby offers up his own. Back in 1861, Dean kills Finch with Colt's gun. Castiel brings them back to the present before they are able to collect the ashes. A mysterious package from Samuel Colt arrives, containing a jar with the ashes of the phoenix.
123	19	"Mommy Dearest"	John F. Showalter	Adam Glass	April 29, 2011	3X6069	2.01
Sam, Dean, Bobby, and Castiel track Eve to the small town of Grants Pass, Oregon. They discover a bar full of dead people, where Eve changed all of the patrons into vampire/wraith/shapeshifter hybrids. Police come and arrest everyone but Dean, who follows them to the police station. Sam kills all but one of the hybrids. Castiel interrogates the hybrid and finds out Eve is at a diner. In the diner, Eve tells Sam and Dean that Crowley is still alive and is after the power of the souls, not the purgatory, and is also torturing her children. She wants to ruin Crowley's plans by sending souls to Purgatory instead of Hell. When Dean refuses to deal, Eve bites him. Dean reveals he had mixed phoenix ashes into his whiskey, which poisons and kills her. Castiel kills the hybrids and spirits the men away. Crowley meets with Castiel at the diner, saying he is tired of cleaning up his messes.
124	20	"The Man Who Would Be King"	Ben Edlund	Ben Edlund	May 6, 2011	3X6070	2.11
The majority of the episode is from Castiel's perspective. He is no longer sure that stopping the Apocalypse was the right choice. Castiel goes to meet with Crowley, who is doing experiments with Eve's corpse. Crowley thinks the Winchesters are distracting Castiel, and tells him to kill them, but Castiel refuses. Castiel reveals he started the civil war in Heaven because Raphael wanted to raise Michael and Lucifer and resume the Apocalypse. The brothers summon Castiel and trap him in a circle of holy fire. Dean asks if Castiel is working with Crowley, and from Castiel's inability to look him in the eyes, Dean knows the answer. Crowley then appears to release Castiel, repeating that the Winchesters are holding him back. Back at Bobby's, Castiel appears to Dean, telling him to understand that he is doing this for him. Dean then says he will do anything to stop him. Castiel asks God for a sign to see if what he is doing is right or wrong, and says that if God doesn't answer him, he will do whatever it takes. There is no sign.
125	21	"Let It Bleed"	John F. Showalter	Sera Gamble	May 20, 2011	3X6071	2.02
Crowley has Lisa and Ben kidnapped as a warning to Dean not to meddle in his plans. The brothers find a manuscript describing Purgatory written by H.P. Lovecraft. Shortly before his death, Lovecraft invited guests for a first-hand look into another dimension, where all of them ended up dead or insane. Bobby speaks with the sole survivor of the Lovecraft party back in 1937 to know more details and finds out that the old man's mother is his friend Dr. Ellie Visyak, who is in fact an immortal. Dr. Visyak refuses to tell Bobby how to open the gate to Purgatory. Balthazar teleports the brothers to where Lisa and Ben are being held, where Dean discovers that Lisa is possessed. Dean exorcises the demon, carries Lisa outside, and the group heads for the hospital. Castiel heals Lisa's wounds without being asked, and both he and Dean admit they wish this changed the fact that they are now enemies. Castiel erases Lisa and Ben's memories of Dean so they can live a normal life. Later, Castiel captures Ellie.
126	22	"The Man Who Knew Too Much"	Robert Singer	Eric Kripke	May 20, 2011	3X6072	2.11
In trying to recover his lost memories, Sam remembers helping Dean and Bobby look for Ellie Visyak, who has died from her wounds while escaping from Crowley. Castiel breaks the wall in Sam's mind and Sam absorbs his memories of the time he was soulless. In the real world, Balthazar reveals Crowley's hiding place to Dean and Bobby. Dean and Bobby arrive at Crowley's hideout, but are attacked by a cloud of demons. Castiel tries to kill Crowley but discovers that he cannot. Crowley has allied with Raphael as Castiel betrayed him. Giving up Ellie's Purgatory blood, Castiel escapes. Crowley recites the spell to open Purgatory with Raphael, but nothing happens. Castiel had switched the jars of Purgatory blood, using the real one to open Purgatory and absorb every soul there. Now all powerful, Castiel proclaims himself as the new God of the world, and tells the group to bow down and profess their love unto him their Lord or he shall destroy them.

== Production ==
The show's creator Eric Kripke originally planned for the show to last only five seasons, but due to increased ratings from the fourth and fifth seasons, the CW network renewed the series for a sixth season. Kripke did not return as showrunner; however, he remained a hands-on executive producer, leaving long-time series writer Sera Gamble to take over the day-to-day production of the show. Filming for the season began with the series star Jensen Ackles-directed fourth episode, "Weekend at Bobby's", to give the actor enough time for pre-production. Kripke also wrote the season finale.

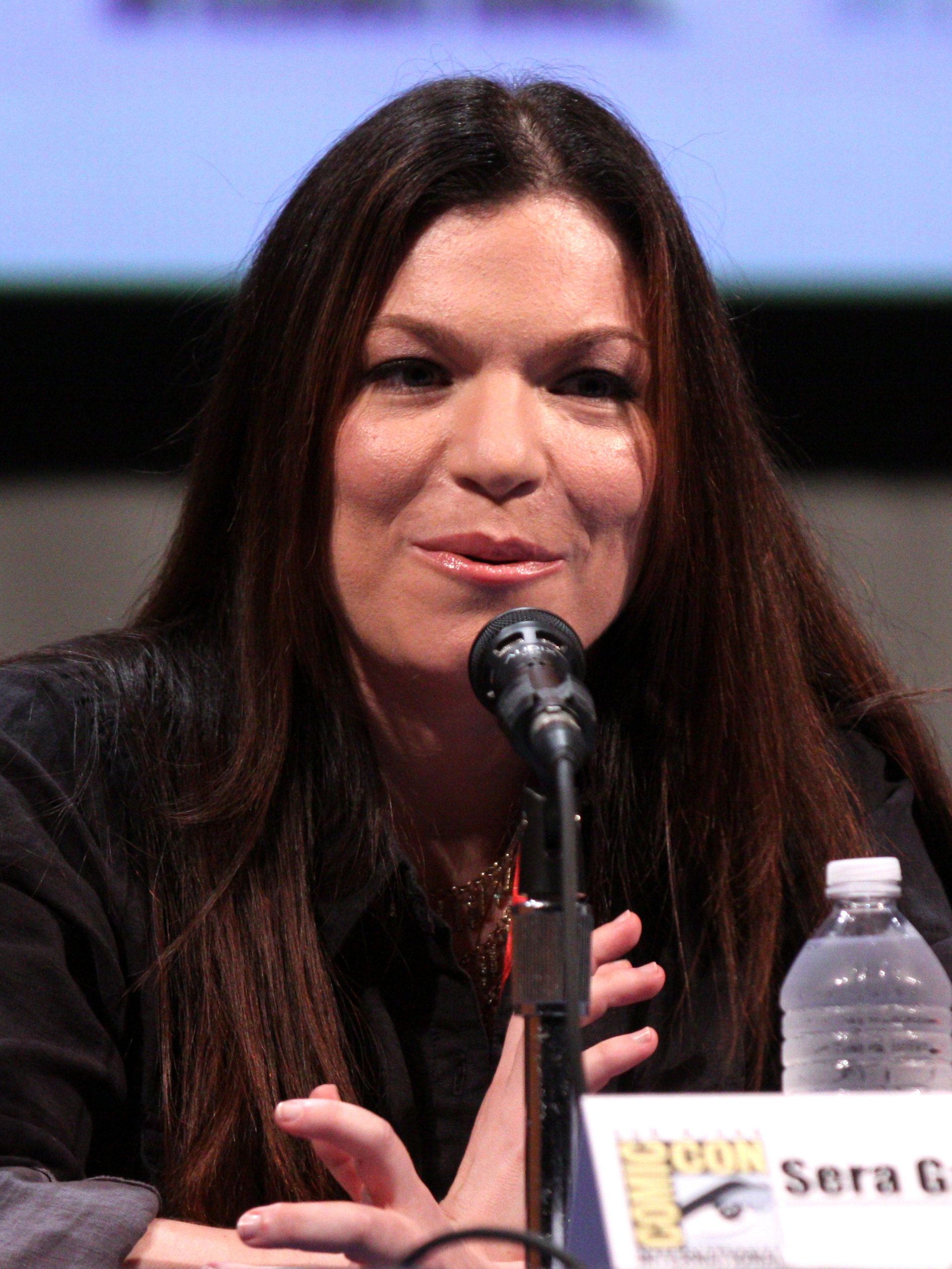
Sera Gamble, who worked on Supernatural since its first season, took over as showrunner for the sixth season.

Gamble said the sixth season of the show would focus on the brothers' relationship. The season steered towards the format of the early seasons with "lots of meat-and-potatoes closed-ended episodes, and... a season-long story arc to weave in". According to a press release by the CW, Heaven and Hell fell into "complete disarray", forcing Sam and Dean to reunite to "beat back the rising tide of creatures and demon-spawn" that "roam across a lawless and chaotic landscape". The season jumped ahead a year to "get some distance between [Sam and Dean], get some personal history for each of them" to allow for "new conflict, new circumstances, new stuff". The brothers' roles were reversed, with Dean now hesitant to return to the hunting lifestyle. The brothers investigated why monsters have been "acting off-pattern". The first few episodes establish the mythology. An episode spoofing Twilight and other vampire series aired in October 2010 and examined the "current romantic fascination" with vampires. However, the Twilight fans at the center of the Winchesters' "disparaging" comments were "slightly fictionalized". On this, Gamble noted, "...part of the thing is finding a balance between [showing] a poster from the actual show and having Sam and Dean really speak their minds. We don't want to offend." A fan of the Twilight series, she also commented, "I'm certainly not coming at this from a place of feeling superior to them. I have great respect." Another episode of the season, "Clap Your Hands if You Believe", consisted of an "insane" storyline featuring Tinker Bell, and the episode began with an alien abduction and a redone title sequence that is a tribute to The X-Files.

Misha Collins returned as series regular Castiel, and Jim Beaver returned as Bobby Singer for several episodes. Mitch Pileggi made multiple appearances as Sam and Dean's grandfather Samuel. The recurring role of Christian, the maternal cousin of Sam and Dean, was given to Corin Nemec; he was described as "capable, calm under pressure, and very good at his job". Kim Rhodes returned as Sheriff Jody Mills, as did Fredric Lehne as Azazel.

A two-hour season finale aired on May 20, 2011.

== Reception ==
The review aggregator website Rotten Tomatoes reported a 100% approval rating for Supernatural's sixth season, with an average rating of 7.3/10 based on 6 reviews.
