= Swan Song (Supernatural) =

- Supernatural episode
- Episode no.: Season 5 Episode 22
- Directed by: Steve Boyum
- Story by: Eric Gewirtz
- Teleplay by: Eric Kripke
- Cinematography by: Serge Ladouceur
- Editing by: Anthony Pinker
- Production code: 3X5222
- Original air date: May 13, 2010

Guest appearances
- Jim Beaver as Bobby Singer; Rob Benedict as Chuck Shurley; Mark Pellegrino as Lucifer; Jake Abel as Michael; Cindy Sampson as Lisa Braeden

Episode chronology
← Previous "Two Minutes to Midnight"	Next → "Exile on Main St."
- Supernatural season 5

"Swan Song" is the fifth-season finale of The CW television series Supernatural. It is the 22nd episode of the fifth season, and is the show's 104th episode overall. Steve Boyum directed the episode with teleplay written by series creator Eric Kripke and story written by Eric Gewirtz. The episode aired on Thursday, May 13, 2010, and concluded the series' originally slated storyline. The narrative follows the series' protagonists Sam (Jared Padalecki) and Dean Winchester (Jensen Ackles)—brothers who travel the continental United States hunting supernatural creatures—as they attempt to stop the Apocalypse.

== Plot ==
Dean Winchester (Jensen Ackles) agrees on letting Sam (Jared Padalecki) be the host for Lucifer (Mark Pellegrino). Sam intends to take control of his body afterwards and jump into Lucifer's cage in Hell, trapping Lucifer and stopping the apocalypse. Sam consumes gallons of demon blood in preparation for Lucifer's possession and Sam and Dean allow themselves to be caught by demons and brought to Lucifer. After demonstrating his enhanced powers to kill the demons in the room, Sam consents for Lucifer to possess his body. Lucifer reveals that he knows their plan, and agrees to possess Sam while letting him try to retain control. After Lucifer enters Sam, he is knocked unconscious, and Dean quickly throws the key to the cage on the wall and opens it with a spell. After waking up Sam, Lucifer reveals that he is in control and overpowered Sam in a matter of seconds. Lucifer closes the portal, puts the key into his pocket and vanishes.

Lucifer appears in a room with several demons and begins conversing with Sam's consciousness. He states that he can feel Sam trying to take control of his body, but that Sam should accept that he is enjoying it. Sam, portrayed in a broken mirror, angrily denies this but Lucifer claims he can see all of Sam's past and knows how he truly feels. Lucifer wants Dean to live and will bring back their parents when it's over. When Sam refuses to give in, Lucifer reveals the demons in the room are people from Sam's past dating back to his infancy, all part of Azazel's plan. He reminds Sam of their lifelong manipulation and tries to tempt him into getting revenge. Sam does not, so Lucifer brutally murders the demons.

Distraught about their plan's failure and desperate to stop Lucifer, Dean regroups with Bobby (Jim Beaver) and Castiel (Misha Collins) who tell him that there is nothing more they can do. Castiel explains that Michael and Lucifer will engage in an apocalyptic battle. Dean can't accept this and contacts Chuck Shurley to learn the location of the battle. Castiel warns Dean that if he goes to the battle he will witness Michael kill Sam, but Dean counters that he won't let his brother die alone.

Lucifer is seen standing in Stull Cemetery, outside of Lawrence, Kansas when Michael, possessing Adam Milligan (Jake Abel), arrives. Dean arrives on scene and tries to get through to Sam. Michael is furious with this interruption and confronts Dean just as Castiel and Bobby also arrive. Castiel throws a Molotov cocktail of Holy Oil on Michael, forcing him to temporarily vanish. Lucifer, outraged at Castiel's action, blows him up. Bobby shoots Lucifer to distract him from Dean. Annoyed, Lucifer snaps Bobby's neck. Dean repeatedly appeals to Sam to overpower Lucifer, who responds by severely beating him until he is barely conscious.

As he presses Dean against the side of the Impala, ready to deliver another blow, a plastic army man in one of its doors catches his sight. This triggers memories of Sam's childhood and various warm moments with Dean, which allow Sam to overpower Lucifer. He opens the cage with the Horsemen's rings, just as Michael suddenly returns and charges him. Sam pulls Michael with him into the cage and the portal closes. Castiel reappears and tells Dean he was resurrected by God and promoted. He heals Dean and resurrects Bobby.

Dean heads for Lisa's house where she gladly welcomes him in. Meanwhile, Chuck Shurley (Rob Benedict), who has been narrating much of the story while writing on his computer, smiles as he brings an end to the story and states "nothing ever really ends, does it?". He then vanishes into thin air, wearing a white shirt instead of his usual drab clothes. Outside of Lisa's house, a streetlight goes out and Sam is shown standing beneath it, watching Dean through the window.

=== Impala Side Story ===
In three segments during the episode, Chuck Shurley narrates a side story about the history of the Impala, which later ties into Sam overpowering Lucifer.

The story begins with a scene from an automotive plant. Chuck explains that on April 21, 1967, an automotive plant in Janesville produced their millionth GM vehicle, a blue two door caprice. The caprice prompted celebrations, including a visit from the lieutenant governor. Three days later, the same production line made another car, the 1967 Chevrolet Impala that eventually was passed down to Dean. Chuck states while typing on his computer, "No one gave two craps about her. But they should have" and that it would "turn out to be the most important object in pretty much the whole universe."

The next scene shows a man named Sal Moriarty purchasing the car brand new, for $3999.00 . Chuck describes Moriarty as "an alcoholic with two ex-wives and three blocked arteries", who would drive it on weekends and give bibles to poor people.

When Sal died, the Impala was put up for sale at Rainbow Motors in Lawrence. Chuck said "A young marine (John Winchester) bought her on impulse, after advice from a friend." The scene shows Dean (sent back in time) talking his dad into buying the car in a previous episode ("In the Beginning"). The Impala is priced at $2204.00 in the scene.

Later in the episode, the story picks up again with Chuck explaining the Impala is like any other car, except that it has features other cars don't have. The scene shows Sam and Dean opening their weapons cache in the trunk. Chuck notes those details aren't important. He goes on to explain that what makes the car uniquely theirs is the life Sam and Dean shared in the car.

Clips of their childhood in the car play while Chuck narrates. The clips show a young Sam cramming an army man into the ashtray on the back driver side door, then Dean shoving Legos into the vents, which can still be heard rattling when the heat turns on. Next, the boys are carving their initials into the floorboard. (Seeing the army man later in the episode triggers Sam to take back control of his body from Lucifer.)

The scene then cuts to a clip from an early episode when the Impala was totaled in a semi wreck that almost killed Dean ("Devil's Trap"). Chuck continues to narrate, stating that when Dean completely rebuilt it, he made sure to keep those details, because "it's the blemishes that make her beautiful" ("Everybody Loves a Clown").

In the third segment, Chuck talks about Sam and Dean's life on the road outside of hunting jobs, doing whatever they wanted. The scenes briefly show Chuck's examples: They earn money through odd jobs and hustling; They drive thousands of miles to attend events like concerts or sports; Sometimes they park the Impala, sit on the hood, and stargaze for hours in silence.

The story concludes with a scene where Sam and Dean are sleeping in the Impala, and Chuck saying that "sure, maybe they never really had a roof and four walls, but they were never, in fact, homeless."

== Production ==
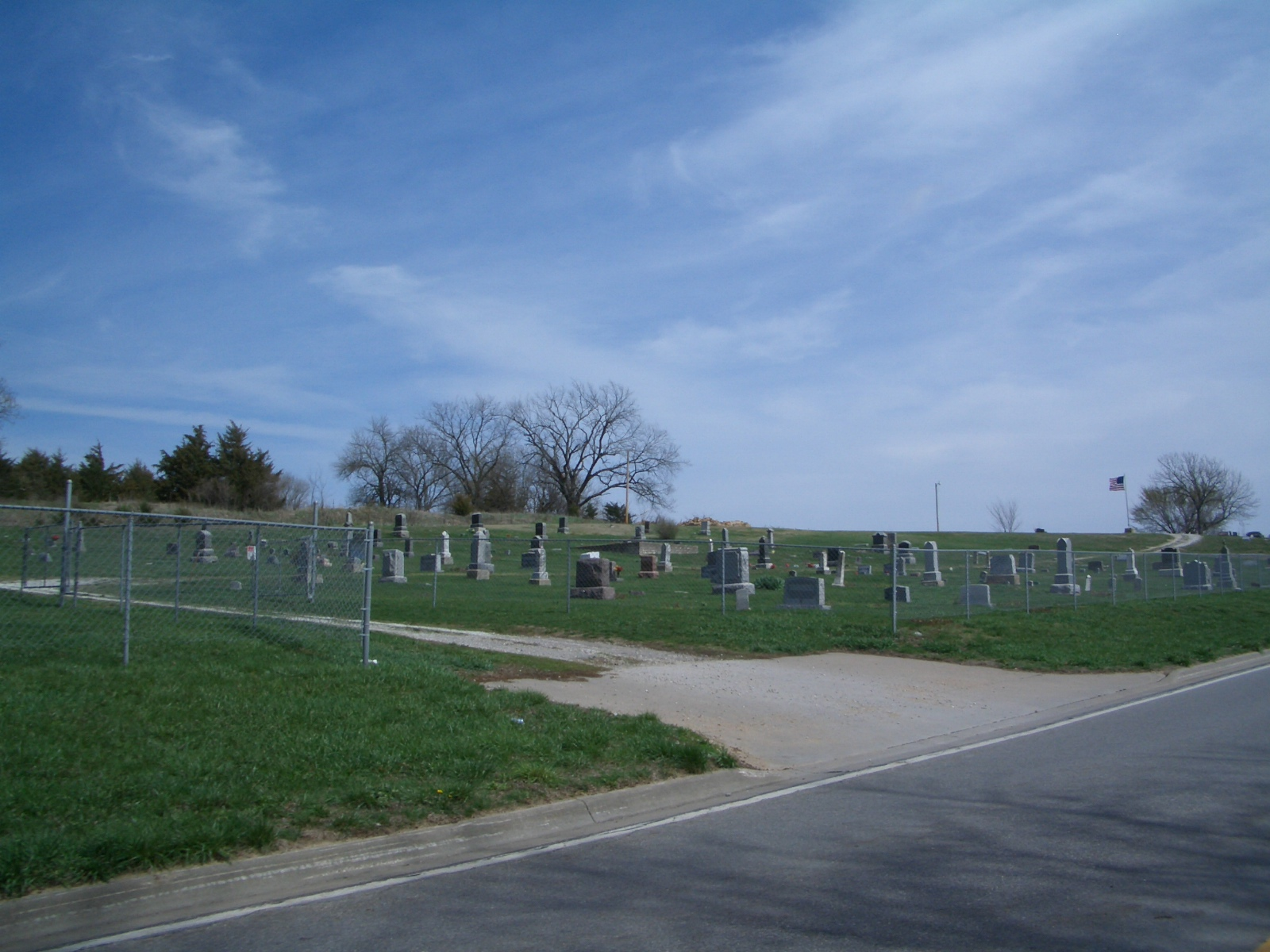
The episode's climax takes place in Stull Cemetery, an actual cemetery in Kansas that local legend claims is possessed by demonic forces.

Showrunner and series creator Eric Kripke originally intended this episode to be the series finale, as he envisioned the series as a five-season show. In August 2009, however, he stated that he was "looking at this season as the [last] chapter in this particular story," but "that doesn't mean there can't be a new story. Buffy did it. The X-Files did it. You close a chapter on a big mythology storyline and then you begin a new one." Since lead actors Jared Padalecki and Jensen Ackles were contracted for another season, and also due to the show's good ratings, The CW renewed the series for a sixth season on February 16, 2010. Executive producer Sera Gamble replaced Kripke as showrunner.

The staff knew of the series' renewal well in advance, allowing Kripke to write the episode without the possibility of cancellation on his mind. Because of the nature of the conversation between Michael and Lucifer in the beginning of the episode's climax, Kripke intentionally gave the scene a "certain kind of quirk" to make it seem less "heavy." For example, Dean turns on "Rock of Ages," a Def Leppard song, before interrupting their meeting, and Castiel's last words involve "calling somebody ass-butt." However, Kripke did not originally intend for Castiel to die, and instead had Lucifer knock him unconscious against a tree. After realizing the anger that Lucifer would have against Castiel for his attack on Michael, though, Kripke chose to kill him. Bobby's death, according to Kripke, was included to "make this feel like it's got weight." The writers of the series have a tendency to kill off the characters, so Beaver "wasn't shocked" that his character was finally killed. At the same time, he "wasn't surprised or relieved" at Bobby's resurrection because he felt the producers would not remove the character from the series.

In this episode, Stull Cemetery, Kansas, is the site of the final confrontation between Lucifer and Michael. According to an apocryphal local legend, it is said that the cemetery—which is located about 30 miles west of Lawrence, KS—is possessed by demonic forces. In a 2006 interview, Kripke revealed that he had made the Winchesters be from Lawrence because of the city's closeness to Stull. The scene featuring the characters in Stull was filmed over three days in Vancouver.

The title of the episode refers to both the phrase "swan song," meaning a final act or gesture before death, and the record company founded by rock band Led Zeppelin in 1974.

== Reception ==
=== Prophet or God ===
Although Kripke announced at Comic-Con 2009 that God would be a character during the fifth season, he makes no apparent appearance in the episodes preceding "Swan Song." As a result, Chuck's disappearance at the episode's conclusion led some viewers to question whether he is merely a prophet that is no longer needed or is actually God. The writers intended for such a reaction, and avoided giving a concrete answer so that the fans could decide for themselves. On God's identity, Gamble commented, "I love a good God debate, so it's nice to hear we got one going this season. We purposely left a bit of room for interpretation. Although many of your readers probably just read that sentence and rolled their eyes because they feel like we made it all very obvious by the end."

=== Ratings and viewership ===
Followed by the first-season finale of The Vampire Diaries, which was watched by 3.471 million of viewers, this episode attracted 2.838 million of viewers, with a 1.3/4 rating/share in the 18–49 demographic and a 1.4/4 in the women 18–34 demographic. Compared to The Vampire Diaries' season finale, this episode had lost 18% of viewers and 46% in the women 18–34 demographic. However, this is a 12% increase in viewers compared to the previous and penultimate episode.

=== Critical reception ===
TV Guide's Tina Charles said that "no matter how [the episode] turns out," it will "just feel significant." She also hoped that Mark Pellegrino would get more scenes in the episode, and praised Jared Padalecki for his acting by saying that he "has gotten better at playing Satan." IGN's Diana Steenbergen, who gave the episode a 9, said that the episode served better as a season finale rather than a series ending, and that the episode could have more actions like the previous ones. She also said that even though Mark Pellegrino was great as Lucifer, Jared did "an admirable job playing both Lucifer and Sam." The episode ranked #22 in the Futon Critic's Best Episodes of 2010, being the highest for any series on the CW. It was ranked as the show's best episode by both Entertainment Weekly and IGN.
