= Jessica Heafey =

Canadian actress

Jessica Heafey is a Canadian actress. She was born March 7, 1983, in Canada and graduated from Dalhousie University with a Bachelor of Arts.

== Career ==
Jessica started her acting career in 2000 at Presentation House Theatre and Theatre la Seizieme.

She is a theatrical actress that works in film, television, and has been assistant to director. She does voices in not only English, but French as well. Heafey began her professional acting career in 2000, and has since appeared in film, short films, and TV series. Heafey starred in A Night for Dying Tiger (2010), Earthstorm (2006), Mordu (2007), and For Better or for Worse (Season 1 Episode 1-16 in 2000). She has also guest starred in Supernatural (Season 6 Episode 1,2,7, and 16 in 2010-2011), M.V.P. (Season 1 episode 6 and 9 in 2008), Jeremiah (Season 1 Episode 13). She is also affiliated with the Alliance of Canadian Cinema, Television and Radio Artists.

=== Supernatural ===
Heafey is most known for her role on Supernatural, where she plays the role of Gwen Campbell, who is a hunter and a cousin to Dean and Sam Winchester. Jessica Heafey appears in 4 episodes in the 6th season. In "Exile on Main Street", Dean gets back into hunting and reunites with Sam. Sam reveals that he has been hunting for a year with the Campbells, which included Gwen. In "Two and Half Men" the Winchesters arrive with a baby Shapeshifter. The Alpha Shapeshifter arrives and overpowers Gwen as well as the others. In "Family matters" she is told to stay back with Dean to wait for any Vampires that double back. Dean and Gwen fight a vampire down, and when Dean disobeys his order, Gwen tells a lie to cover for him. At the end of the episode Gwen shows who she is loyal to when she holds the Winchesters at gunpoint. In "...And Then There Were None", Gwen and the Campbells are investigating murders when they run into Bobby, Rufus, Sam and Dean. The creator responsible for the murders infects Dean, who kills Gwen.
