= Misha Collins =

American actor

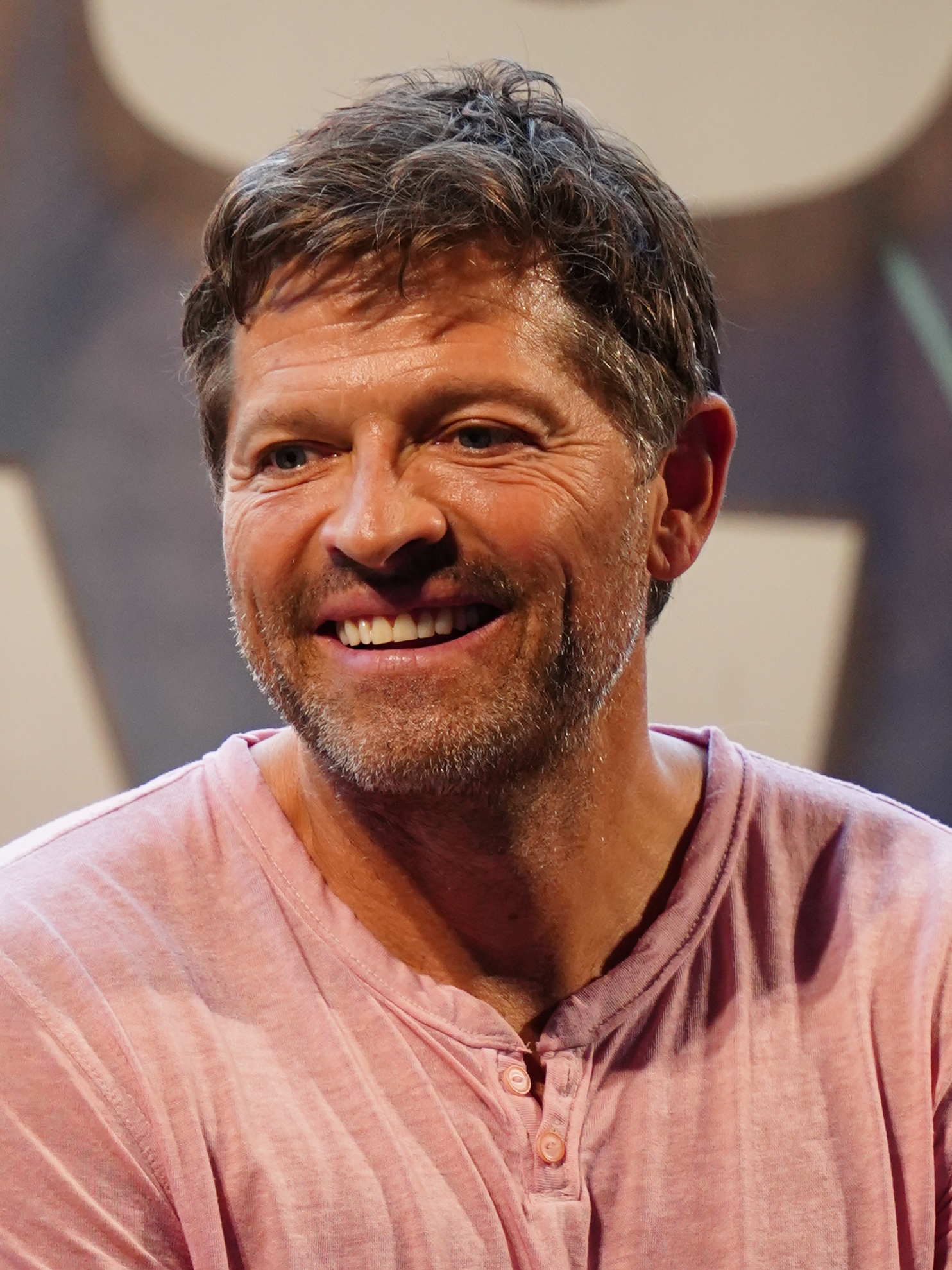
- Collins at the 2026 Comic Con in Brussels
- Born: Dmitri Tippens Krushnic; August 20, 1974 (age 52); Boston, Massachusetts, U.S.
- Education: Northfield Mount Hermon School; University of Chicago
- Occupations: Actor, author
- Years active: 1998–present
- Spouse: Victoria Vantoch (m. 2001; sep. 2021)
- Children: 2

Dmitri "Misha" Collins (born Dmitri Tippens Krushnic; August 20, 1974) is an American actor best known for his role as the angel Castiel on the CW television series Supernatural (2008–2020).

== Early life ==
Misha Collins was born in Boston, Massachusetts. His mother is Rebecca Tippens. He was raised in an irreligious family. Growing up, his family was poor and often homeless. He has said that his surname, Krushnic, "goes back six generations in Canada, and we're not sure where they came from". He is of partial Jewish descent.

Collins attended Greenfield Center School, Northfield Mount Hermon School and the University of Chicago, where he studied social theory.

== Career ==
=== Interning ===
Before acting, he interned for four months at the White House during the Clinton Administration in the Office of Presidential Personnel.

=== Acting ===
His film work includes an uncredited appearance in the 1999 movie Liberty Heights, as well as roles in Girl, Interrupted, Finding Home, Karla, and Loot (on which he also served as Associate Producer).

He starred as the angel Castiel on the CW television series Supernatural from 2008 to 2020. Some of his other television credits include Legacy, Charmed, NYPD Blue, 24, CSI: Crime Scene Investigation, ER, Monk, and Timeless. He hosted Roadfood: Discovering America One Dish at a Time on PBS, a TV show focused on local foods in America. In 2022, he was cast as Harvey Dent/Two Face in Gotham Knights on the CW.

He has appeared on several podcasts. In 2018, he voiced the role of Adler Harrison in The Angel of Vine, produced by Vox Populi. In 2021, he starred as Jeremy Bradshaw on Bridgewater produced by Grim & Mild.

=== Writing ===
Collins is a published poet. His poems, including "Baby Pants" and "Old Bones", can be found in the 2008 edition of Columbia Poetry Review #21.

Collins has also co-written a cookbook, The Adventurous Eaters Club, with his wife, Vicki Collins. It is reported that much of the book's sales will go to charitable organizations who specialize in food nutrition.

Collins and Kathryn Leonard, together with several other collaborators, are authors of "The 2D Shape Structure Dataset", an academic research paper on a crowd-sourced database on the structure of shapes.

Collins's poetry book, Some Things I Still Can't Tell You, was published on October 12, 2021, and reached the NYTimes bestseller list.

== Charity work ==
Collins is the co-founder and board president of Random Acts, a non-profit organization dedicated to funding and inspiring acts of kindness around the world. Collins founded the Greatest International Scavenger Hunt the World Has Ever Seen (GISHWHES) in 2011. Entrance fees for the international competition go towards Random Acts, and in 2012, GISHWHES broke the world record for most pledges to perform an act of kindness.

On May 5, 2023, Collins became an ambassador of the United 24 platform.

On May 21, 2024, Collins visited Kyiv, along with American filmmaker Darius Marder. Collins has started a fundraiser for a pyrotechnic machine for humanitarian demining.

== Personal life ==
On October 6, 2001, Collins married Victoria Vantoch in Maine. They have a son born in 2010 and a daughter born in 2012.

In the acknowledgments of his 2021 poetry book, Some Things I Still Can't Tell You, Collins stated that he and his wife had separated.

In April 2022, Collins clarified that he is straight after a fan convention appearance led to reports he had appeared to come out as bisexual.

In a 2008 interview, he said that Supernatural showrunner Eric Kripke asked him to read the Book of Revelation as research into Castiel's nature, and he was surprised by the biblical text: "In reading that, I was kind of surprised. There is a lot of destructive capacity in an angel's being."

== Filmography ==
=== Film ===
Year	Title	Role	Notes
1999	Liberty Heights	Guy	Uncredited
1999	Girl, Interrupted	Tony	
2002	Par 6	Al Hegelman	
2003	Moving Alan	Tony Derrick	
2003	Finding Home	Dave	
2004	The Crux	Man Hanging from the Rope	Short film
2006	Karla	Paul Bernardo	
2008	Over Her Dead Body	Brian	
2008	The Grift	Buster	
2010	Stonehenge Apocalypse	Dr. Jacob Glaser	Canadian TV movie
2013	TSA America: Just Relax	Officer Franklin	Short films; also producer, director and writer
2014	TSA America: Suspicious Bulge	Officer Franklin	Short films; also producer, director and writer
2014	TSA America: Yeah, But Is It Ticking?	Officer Franklin	Short films; also producer, director and writer
2021	Encounter	Dylan	

=== Television ===
Year	Title	Role	Notes
1998	Legacy	Andrew	Episode: "The Big Fix"
1999	Charmed	Eric Bragg	Episode: "They're Everywhere"
2000	NYPD Blue	Blake DeWitt	Episode: "Welcome to New York"
2001	Seven Days	Sergei Chubais	Episode: "Born in the USSR"
2002	24	Alexis Drazen	Recurring role; 7 episodes
2005	CSI: Crime Scene Investigation	Vlad	Episode: "Nesting Dolls"
2005	20 Things to Do Before You're 30	Unknown role	Unaired television series
2005–2006	ER	Bret	Recurring role; 3 episodes
2006	NCIS	Justin Farris	Episode: "Singled Out"
2006	Monk	Michael Karapov	Episode: "Mr. Monk and the Captain's Marriage"
2006	Close to Home	Todd Monroe	Episode: "There's Something About Martha"
2007	Without a Trace	Chester Lake	Episode: "Run"
2007	CSI: NY	Morton Brite	Episode: "Can You Hear Me Now?"
2007	Reinventing the Wheelers	Joey Wheeler	Unaired television pilot
2008–2020	Supernatural	Castiel / Jimmy Novak / Himself / Leviathan / Lucifer / Cosmic Entity	Recurring role (Seasons 4 and 8); Main role (Seasons 5–6, 9–15); Guest role (Season 7 and 8); 147 episodes Also Director: Season 9, episode 17
2009	Nip/Tuck	Manny Skerritt	Episode: "Manny Skerritt"
2010	Stonehenge Apocalypse	Jacob	Television film
2012	Ringer	Dylan	Episode: "Whores Don't Make That Much"
2014	Whose Line Is It Anyway?	Himself	Episode: "Misha Collins"
2015	Kittens in a Cage	Porn Director	Episode: "Punch and Lemon Squares"
2015–2018	The Hillywood Show	Ghostbusters Receptionist / Dancer	Guest role; 2 episodes
2016	The Venture Bros.	Prisoner 2 / Maestro Wave	Episode: "Red Means Stop"; voice role
2017	Kings of Con	Doug Walderman	Episode: "Arlington, VA"
2017	Timeless	Eliot Ness	Episode: "Public Enemy No. 1"
2021–2022	Roadfood: Discovering America One Dish at a Time	Himself	Host
2023	Gotham Knights	Harvey Dent	Main role
2026	The Boys	Malchemical	episode: "One-Shots"

=== Podcasts ===
Acting roles are in bold.

Year	Title	Role	Air Date	Notes	Episode Title
2012	Winchester Radio	Himself	Nov 11, 2012	Guest Role	Winchester Radio - Special edition with guest Misha Collins
2013	ID10T with Chris Hardwick	Himself	Jul 1, 2013	Guest Role	
2014	girl on guy	Himself	February 4, 2014		125: misha collins
2016	Hype Podcast	Himself	Jun 17, 2016	Guest Role	Hype Special #13 – Talking G.I.S.H.W.H.E.S. with Misha Collins
2016	Too Beautiful To Live	Himself	Dec 27, 2016	Guest Role	City of Subdued Podcasting w/ Misha Collins
**2018**	**The Angel of Vine**	**Adler Harrison**	**Nov 2018 - Jan 2019**	**4 Episodes**	
2019	Inside of You with Michael Rosenbaum	Himself	Oct 2, 2019	Guest Role	
2019	The Art of Fatherhood	Himself	Nov 5, 2019	Guest Role	
2020	The "Doctor Mom" Podcast	Himself	Jan 2020	Guest Role	Raising Adventurous Eaters with Misha and Vicki Collins
2020	Craft Service	Himself	Dec 2020	Guest Role	The Unpredictability of Life ft Misha Collins
2021	Kings of Con: The Podcast	Himself	Jan 27, 2021	Guest Role	Misha Collins and kitchen decor
2021	Alyssa Milano: Sorry Not Sorry	Himself	Jul 12, 2021	Guest Role	Supernatural's Misha Collins on Acting, Activism, and What's Next
2021	**Bridgewater**	**Jeremy Bradshaw**	**Aug 5, 2021 - Oct 1, 2021**	**Main Role; 10 Episodes**	
2022	Inside of You with Michael Rosenbaum	Himself	Mar 22, 2022	Guest Role	Misha Collins On Supernatural End, Jared and Jensen, Standing Out, Cult Fans & More

=== Web ===
Year	Title	Role	Notes
2011	Ghostfacers	Castiel	Episode: "Ghostfacers Meet Castiel"
2011	Divine: The Series	Father Christopher	Also producer and writer

=== Producer ===
Year	Title	Notes
2008	Loot	Documentary film; also associate producer

=== Director ===
Year	Title	Notes
2010	Stranger Danger	Short film; also writer

== Awards and nominations ==
Year	Award	Category	Work	Result
2014	People's Choice Awards	Favorite TV Bromance (shared with Jared Padalecki and Jensen Ackles)	Supernatural	Won
2015	People's Choice Awards	Favorite Sci-Fi/Fantasy TV Actor	Supernatural	Won
2016	People's Choice Awards	Favorite Sci-Fi/Fantasy TV Actor	Supernatural	Nominated
