= Thomas Sibley =

Thomas Sibley may refer to:

- Tom Sibley (footballer) (1920-1994), Welsh footballer, see List of Rochdale A.F.C. players (25–99 appearances)
- Tom Sibley (actor), see The Angel of Vine
