= Pilot (Ringer) =

- Ringer episode
- Bridget reuniting with her estranged twin sister Siobhan. The episode introduces the main characters and concept of the series.
- Episode no.: Season 1 Episode 1
- Directed by: Richard Shepard
- Written by: Eric Charmelo; Nicole Snyder
- Editing by: Byron Smith
- Original air date: September 13, 2011
- Running time: 40 minutes

Episode chronology
← Previous —	Next → "She's Ruining Everything"

"Pilot" is the pilot episode of the American television drama Ringer, which originally aired on The CW Television Network on September 13, 2011. The episode was written by Eric Charmelo and Nicole Snyder and directed by Richard Shepard. The episode achieved 2.84 million viewers on its initial broadcast; reaching a three-year high for The CW in the Tuesday 9:00pm time slot.

== Plot ==
After attending a Narcotics Anonymous meeting, Bridget Kelly (Sarah Michelle Gellar) returns to the motel with FBI Agent Victor Machado (Nestor Carbonell). Despite being assured of her safety (she is a witness to a mob-style murder), she knocks out Agent Machado's partner Jimmy, takes his gun and runs away. She goes to New York City and meet with her estranged twin sister, Siobhan Martin. Bridget and Siobhan go to Siobhan's weekend house in the Hamptons. Bridget begins to apologize to Siobhan about an incident involving someone named Sean, but Siobhan insists that she is already forgiven and now needs only to forgive herself. They go out on a boat ride where Bridget falls asleep, waking to find Siobhan's ring in a pill bottle and Siobhan herself missing. Having been told by her that most people in her life don't know Siobhan has a sister, Bridget assumes Siobhan's identity to avoid both the mob and the FBI. She tells this only to her NA sponsor Malcolm Ward (Mike Colter) that her sister is dead and what she has done. During their phone conversation, she notices a man on the street watching her.

The next day, Siobhan's friend, Gemma (Tara Summers), calls and tells that they were supposed to meet at Siobhan's loft that Gemma was helping renovate. When they meet, Gemma mentions her fear that her husband, Henry Butler (Kristoffer Polaha), is having an affair. Later that evening Bridget (as Siobhan) attends a fundraising gala with her (Siobhan's) husband, Andrew Martin (Ioan Gruffudd), who has recently returned from London. She sees the man who was watching her earlier, and tries to avoid him. To her surprise, when they meet, he gives her a kiss. It is revealed that the man is Henry, Gemma's husband, and that Siobhan was the one having an affair with him. Bridget-as-Siobhan refuses his advances.

Bridget attends an NA meeting in New York and comes home to find Siobhan's stepdaughter, Juliet (Zoey Deutch), home from boarding school and having sex with her boyfriend. Bridget-as-Siobhan worries because Juliet has apparently gone through her drawer (where she kept the gun she stole) and took a scarf, using it as a blindfold. Bridget checks and sees the gun still there, so she hides it in one of the newspapers used in the under-renovation loft. Gemma sees her there (but not the gun). Bridget-as-Siobhan is later questioned by Victor Machado concerning Bridget's whereabouts. Bridget-as-Siobhan manages to maintain composure and avoids detection. Meanwhile, Malcolm walks out of a building, where the mob sees him.

Bridget-as-Siobhan asks Henry to avoid her, and in the process, tells him about a recent phone call from a doctor telling her she's pregnant. Juliet, meanwhile, acts out to her father but is assured by him about him and Siobhan loving her. He later informs Siobhan (who is really Bridget) that Juliet got kicked out of Boarding School for doing drugs. Gemma calls Bridget and tells her that she thinks she knows who Henry is having an affair with and tells her to go to the loft. Upon arriving, she finds a man with a crowbar and tries to avoid him (this is where the episode starts). However she is seen by him and he tries to choke her. She manages to avoid him, and upon seeing the newspaper where she hid the gun, goes to it, takes the gun and shoots the man - while shouting, "I'm not Bridget!" When he dies, she checks his pockets and finds a picture with the words "Siobhan Martin" in the back. The final scene is in Paris, where Siobhan (now revealed to be alive) is called by a man who says, "We have a problem."

== Production ==
=== Conception ===
It was announced in early 2011 that Sarah Michelle Gellar would be starring in a pilot for CBS entitled Ringer. Filming for the pilot began in March 2011 in New York City. The pilot was picked up to a series on May 13, 2011 by CBS's sister network The CW. Following this ABC Studios, which co-produced the pilot, pulled out from the series, citing displeasure of the network move. On May 17, 2011, it was announced that Warner Bros. would co-producer the series.

=== Casting ===
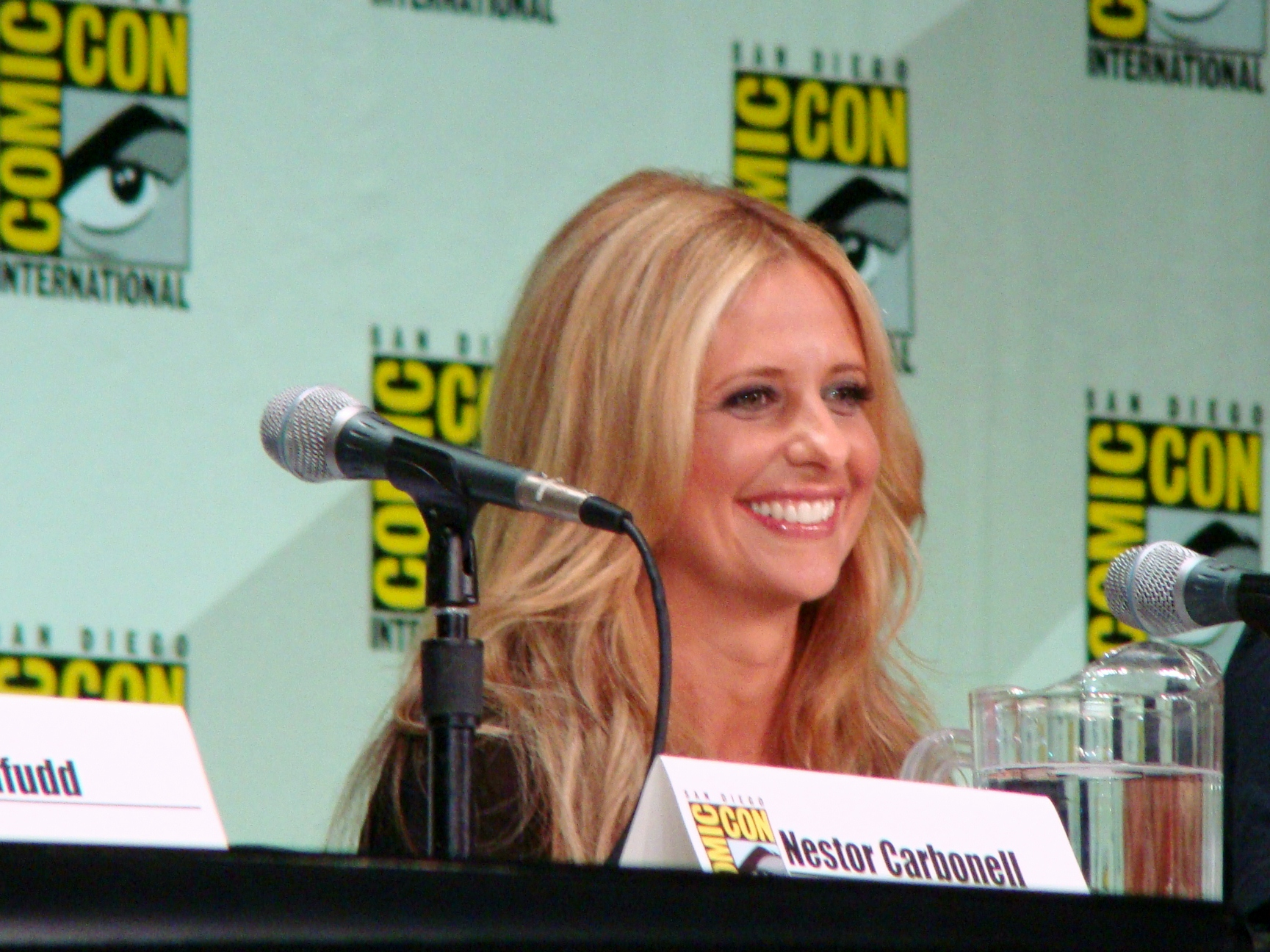
Sarah Michelle Gellar (pictured) was the first to be cast in the series.

Casting announcements for the series began in January 2011. Sarah Michelle Gellar was the first to be cast. Gellar was cast to portray twin sisters Bridget Kelly and Siobhan Martin. Next to be cast was Nestor Carbonell as Victor Machado, followed by Ioan Gruffudd and Mike Colter, as Andrew Martin and Malcolm Howard, respectively. Tara Summers later joined the series as Gemma Gallagher, with Kristoffer Polaha being the last actor to be cast in March 2011, portraying Henry Gallagher.

== Broadcast and reception ==
The initial broadcast of the episode drew 2.84 million U.S. viewers. It received a 1.6 rating in The CW's target of women 18-34 and a 1.2 rating in adults 18-49. The ratings reached a three-year high for The CW in the Tuesday 9:00pm time slot. On September 16, The CW re-broadcast the pilot, which brought in 1.87 million viewers, and a 0.6 18-49 demo rating.

TV.com was enthusiastic about the pilot saying it was over-the-top with its "convoluted mystery" and they were "still feeling nauseated from all the twists and turns" which provide a lot of fun times. They also loved the late-60s vibe. Their last word was: "Outrageous. But potentially delicious fun." Matt Mitovich of TVLine gave the pilot a positive review stating, "the set-up is sound, with some loose ends addressed and nice details sprinkled in. Tackling multiple roles, Gellar does a fine job as in-too-deep Bridget, icy Siobhan, and Bridget-as-Siobhan, and the supporting cast presents no weak link." After Elton gave Ringer a positive review calling it "the single best new show of the year". Ringer was one of the Editor's Picks of Yahoo! saying "the first episode delivers so many shocking twists and turns, you won't be able to catch your breath. Heck, we're still catching ours." Media Life Magazine gave a positive review "despite the inherent absurdity of the premise" stating Ringer's pilot was "deftly portrayed and dead on" and that it "justifies a return visit".

Hollywood News made a positive review of the pilot underlining the fact that the show's concept was interestingly explored and the twists were crazy; adding "when it commits at this level, you just want to see what they’ll do next. [..] Every act break has a soap opera-y twist, but it’s cool". E! News also gave the pilot a positive review stating the show was "intense" and described Sarah Michelle Gellar as "awesome" and "fantastic". Their verdict was "watch, watch, watch!". They loved the "film noir-ness" of the show while they admit "there was just too much stuffed into the pilot". The Examiner gave the pilot 4/5 stars praising its intelligence and complex storytelling, a welcome change for the CW. Stating, "Ringer is an intense thriller full of twists and turns that feels like a mini movie". The Boston Phoenix gave a positive review stating "Ringer actually knows where it's going" and praised Sarah Michelle Gellar acting, "it's a pleasure to watch Gellar back on the small screen. As long as she's in danger, she's entirely loveable." The Hollywood Reporter gave a mixed review saying the pilot wasn't wasting time before "getting to the major complications" and that Gellar was "projecting gravitas" albeit their bottom line was: "unless you're weaned on The CW's fare, it really doesn't have a lot of weight, and Gellar seems stretched a bit thin playing dual roles." But they will give it a few episodes. Hollywood.com gave a positive review as they featured Ringer in the Future Addictions category stating "It's dark, sinister, salacious and mysterious, plus it delivers the girl we all loved as Buffy back in action. [..] Yep, we'll be hooked." Newsday gave a mixed review saying the main reason to watch is "Sarah. Michelle. Gellar.", that she looks "stunning". She might be able to "drag along the cultists from the Buffy, Scream and Grudge years" but the show doesn't fit the network as "it's inert, lackluster and a trifle old-fashioned" giving it a C+ grade.

"Isthmus" gave one of the first negative reviews, stating "Ringer is relentlessly cheesy and humorless, and Gellar is simply awful in her dual role." Las Vegas Weekly gave a good review, putting it in the in-between category right after worth watching, saying it was "a little silly but also juicy and well-acted". Its soapy twists, thriller aspect and dirty secrets could lead Ringer to "unexpected directions that deliver pulpy guilty pleasures. Wait and see". Lincoln Journal Star gave a mixed review saying "Ringer is good, but not great" as it is "more fun to watch than nice". Gellar did a "perfect" job with Siobhan providing her with that "Cruel Intentions touch" but the problem is that "neither Bridget nor Siobhan is likable". They gave it a "C" grade but will "keep watching for a while" as the show looks promising. Ringer was one of the picks of the San Jose Mercury News as "Sarah Michelle Gellar makes a rousing television comeback in a suspenseful thriller" giving it a B grade and The Kansas City Star gave a good rating as "Gellar shines throughout the pilot". Their verdict was: "Watch it". The Post-Gazette Community Voices section gave the pilot a negative review stating "maybe over time Ringer will develop into a decent soap. But it’s hard to imagine it will ever compare favorably to its star's previous television series." The New York Post gave a positive review giving 3/4 stars saying the pilot is "so good that it's CBS' bad" for having given away Ringer to the CW. USA Today gave 3/4 stars thanks to "two very good, well-defined Gellar performances" their bottom line was "you've been given a good show, CW. Don't mess it up." However, Matthew Gilbert of The Boston Globe was negative about Ringer, giving it a "D" grade. He explained "The lousy effects that put the twins in the same room are sloppy, and the story line - ripped from a cheesy daytime soap - is worse. Gellar hasn’t got a firm handle on her characters". The Spectrum gave a A− grade saying Gellar "plays both sides of the spectrum so well it is hard to believe that she has only just begun portraying these two characters".
