= Whores Don't Make That Much =

- Ringer episode
- Episode no.: Season 1 Episode 14
- Directed by: Janice Cooke
- Written by: Robert Doherty
- Original air date: February 21, 2012
- Running time: 40 minutes

Guest appearances
- Misha Collins as Dylan; Zoey Deutch as Juliet Martin; Andrea Roth as Catherine Martin; Jason Dohring as Adam Carpenter

Episode chronology
← Previous "It's Easy to Cry When This Much Cash Is Involved"	Next → "P.S. You're an Idiot"

"Whores Don't Make That Much" is the fourteenth episode of the American television series Ringer. It made its premiere on The CW on February 21, 2012. The episode was written by Robert Doherty and directed by Janice Cooke. In the episode, the truth about what caused the rift between Bridget and Siobhan is revealed while Juliet's scheme takes a dark path.

The episode achieved 1.25 million viewers on its initial broadcast.

== Plot ==
The episode opens with Bridget taking Malcolm to Siobhan's secret office. However, when they get there, the whole place is empty. When she returns to the apartment, she receives a call from a floriculture about a delivery to a woman's house and when she gets the address she decides to see who's the mysterious woman. After entering in the house, the woman thanks Bridget, believing she's Siobhan, for sending the flowers every year. When the woman leaves the room to get some tea, Bridget sees a picture of the woman with a kid, who turns out to be Siobhan's son, Sean. Upon returning to the apartment, Bridget receives the visit of the woman's son, Dylan, who's Sean's father. He tells her that her visit had upset his mother, and that she must stop sending the flowers for good. Flashbacks reveals that Dylan dumped Siobhan after she got pregnant. A few years later, he shows up at her house wanting to see his son. They discuss and he leaves. Siobhan tells Bridget to never let Dylan get closer to Sean. The next day, Dylan returns to Siobhan's house but only Bridget and the kid are there. He asks to take his son out just for the night and that she can go with them, and she accepts. While returning home, Dylan asks is Bridget can support him once he files to be Sean's legal guardian, and a car hits them in the middle of the road, killing Sean in the process. At Sean's funeral, Bridget tries to apologize with Siobhan, who slaps her in the face and refuse to accept her apologies. Back to present day, Bridget discovers where Dylan lives and watches as him plays with his daughter and new wife. In a moment of rage, she takes a brick to throw into their window, but Malcolm stops her. The next morning, Bridget, as Siobhan, comes to Dylan's house and tells him that she forgives him and understands that what happened was an accident and not necessarily their fault. At the end of the episode, Bridget calls Malcolm and tells him that she has decided to tell Andrew and Juliet who she really is.

Juliet discovers that Tessa has bought a car with the money from the scheme they made. Juliet then tells Mr. Carpenter what Tessa did, which could create suspicion, and he tells her that he will take care of that. The next morning, Juliet goes to school only to find out that Tessa has been brutally attacked and is in the hospital, in a coma. She immediately suspects that Mr. Carpenter did it. It's then revealed that her mother, Catherine, who at the beginning of the episode told Andrew that she wants Juliet to move in with her to Miami, was the one who had the idea for the scheme in the first place.

Meanwhile, Henry comes to Andrew's office to take his money from his account. Malcolm, who was just hired by Andrew, sees that Henry has the key to Siobhan's office and decides to keep an eye on him.

== Casting ==
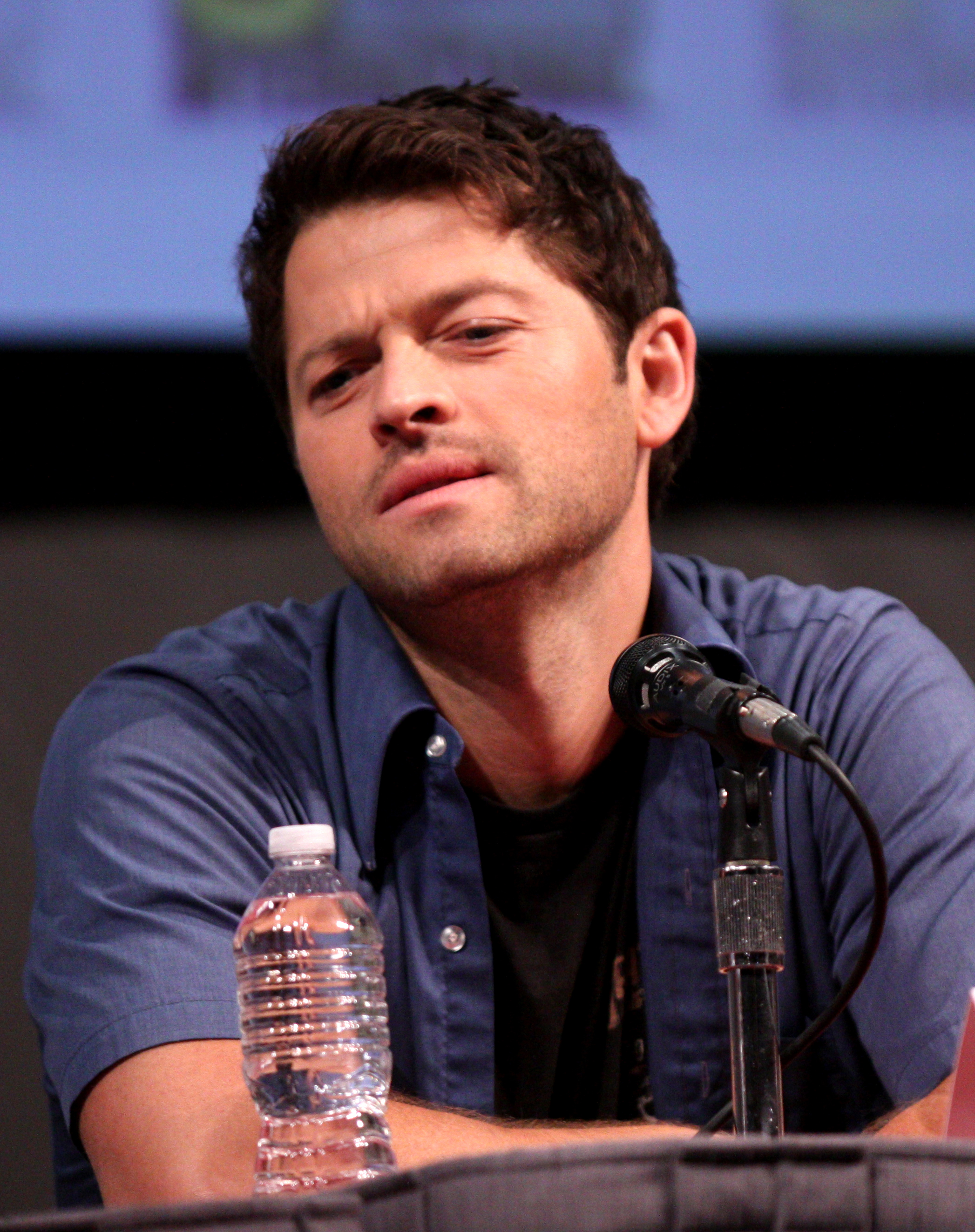
Misha Collins (pictured) was cast as a man from Siobhan's past.

On November 10, 2011, Misha Collins, best known for his role of Castiel in Supernatural, was confirmed to be guest starring as someone from Siobhan's past who was responsible for the wedge that drove the sisters apart. Andrea Roth and Jason Dohring also guest starred as Catherine Martin and Mr. Carpenter, respectively.

== Reception ==
=== Ratings ===
The initial broadcast of the episode drew 1.25 million U.S. viewers. It received a 0.6 rating in The CW's target of women 18–34 and a 0.5 rating in adults 18–49. Overall, it was an improvement of 14% in viewers and 25% in adults 18–49 from last week's episode.

=== Critical reception ===
The episode was met with mixed reception. Colleen Pinto, from The Voice of TV, was disappointed that what caused the rift between the sisters was just an accident, and criticized Bridget's decision of coming out to Andrew. Carrie Raisler, from the A.V. Club, felt that the episode was "fairly satisfying" and said that Sarah Michelle Gellar and Misha Collins gave a decent performance to their characters. She criticized the way the story was played out, and felt that Catherine's revelation was the "least surprising surprise ever". She graded the overall episode with a B−.

Despite the mixed reviews, Misha Collins received positive reviews about his performance as Dylan.
