= Ringer (TV series) =

American television series (2011–2012)

- Genre: Thriller; Drama; Neo-noir; Mystery; Crime
- Created by: Eric Charmelo; Nicole Snyder
- Starring: Sarah Michelle Gellar; Kristoffer Polaha; Ioan Gruffudd; Nestor Carbonell; Mike Colter
- Theme music composer: Gabriel Mann
- Composers: Gabriel Mann (episodes 1–4); Mark Snow (episodes 5–22)
- Country of origin: United States
- Original language: English
- No. of seasons: 1
- No. of episodes: 22

Production
- Executive producers: Rachel Kaplan (pilot only); Sarah Michelle Gellar; Eric Charmelo; Nicole Snyder; Richard Shepard; Jon Liebman; JoAnne Colonna; Peter Traugott; Pam Veasey
- Producers: P. Todd Coe; James Bigwood (pilot only)
- Running time: 42 minutes
- Production companies: Green Eggs and Pam Productions, Inc.; Brillstein Entertainment Partners; ABC Studios; Warner Bros. Television; CBS Television Studios (pilot); CBS Productions (episodes 2–22)

Original release
- Network: The CW
- Release: September 13, 2011 – April 17, 2012

Ringer is an American crime thriller drama television series that aired on The CW from September 13, 2011, to April 17, 2012. The series stars Sarah Michelle Gellar, who plays twin sisters Bridget Kelly and Siobhan Martin. On May 13, 2011, it was reported that the project had been picked up to series by The CW. On October 12, 2011, The CW ordered a full first season of 22 episodes.

Ringer received mixed reviews, though critics praised Gellar's performance. On May 11, 2012, The CW canceled the series after one season.

== Series synopsis ==
Bridget Kelly (Sarah Michelle Gellar) is a recovering drug addict and stripper in Wyoming. She is under the protection of FBI Agent Victor Machado (Nestor Carbonell), having agreed to testify against her employer, local crime boss Bodaway Macawi (Zahn McClarnon), whom she witnessed committing murder. Fearing that Macawi, who has already murdered several witnesses linking him to previous crimes, will also kill her, Bridget flees to New York to meet her estranged twin sister Siobhan (also played by Gellar).

Soon after Bridget's arrival in New York, Siobhan, who had kept her sister's existence secret from her family, appears to commit suicide by jumping into the ocean. Bridget then assumes Siobhan's identity and tries to fit in among Siobhan's wealthy social circle, including Siobhan's husband Andrew (Ioan Gruffudd), stepdaughter Juliet (Zoey Deutch), best friend Gemma (Tara Summers), and Gemma's husband Henry (Kristoffer Polaha) with whom Siobhan had been having an affair. The only one who knows that Bridget is passing as Siobhan is Bridget's Narcotics Anonymous sponsor Malcolm (Mike Colter). Bridget's life becomes more complicated as she discovers that her sister was hiding secrets of her own and that someone is trying to kill Siobhan as well.

== Cast and characters ==
=== Main ===
- Sarah Michelle Gellar as twin sisters Bridget Kelly and Siobhan Martin. Bridget, a troubled young woman wanted dead by the mob, turns to Siobhan for help. When Siobhan appears to commit suicide soon after Bridget's arrival, Bridget assumes her identity—only to learn that Siobhan has secrets of her own.
- Kristoffer Polaha as Henry Butler, Gemma's husband, a writer unhappy with his life who had an affair with Siobhan.
- Ioan Gruffudd as Andrew Martin, a self-made millionaire whose marriage to Siobhan is struggling as he deals with his work and keeping his daughter out of trouble.
- Nestor Carbonell as Victor Machado, an FBI agent whose job is to keep Bridget safe.
- Mike Colter as Malcolm Ward, a recovering addict who is Bridget's Narcotics Anonymous sponsor. He knows about Bridget's double life.

=== Recurring ===
- Zoey Deutch as Juliet Martin, Siobhan's 17-year-old stepdaughter
- Tara Summers as Gemma Butler, Siobhan's best friend
- Zahn McClarnon as Bodaway Macawi, the mob boss who's after Bridget
- Darren Pettie as Detective Jimmy Kemper, Machado's partner in Wyoming
- Jaime Murray as Olivia Charles, Andrew's business partner. It is revealed that Olivia is involved in a relationship with Catherine.
- Justin Bruening as Tyler Barrett, a man who sets his sights on Siobhan
- Billy Miller as John Delario, who is working for Siobhan and meets Bridget during her NA meetings under the Alias Charlie Young. He kidnaps and murders Gemma and while he tries to hide the body, Siobhan kills him.
- Jason Dohring as Mr. Carpenter, a teacher at Juliet's high school
- Gage Golightly as Tessa Banner, Juliet's frenemy
- Andrea Roth as Catherine Martin, Andrew's ex-wife and Juliet's mother. It is revealed that Catherine is involved in a relationship with Olivia.
- Gregory Harrison as Tim Arbogast, Gemma's wealthy father
- Sean Patrick Thomas as Solomon Vessida, Bridget's bodyguard
- Jordan Marder as Rex Barton, a hitman hired by Catherine

=== Guest ===
- Nicole Gale Anderson as Monica Reynolds, Juliet's friend
- Amber Benson as Mary Curtis
- Kether Donohue as Waitress
- Mädchen Amick as Greer Sheridan, a friend of Siobhan
- Misha Collins as Dylan Morrison, the father of Siobhan's deceased son
- Nikki DeLoach as Shaylene Briggs, a stripper who was Bridget's co-worker and Machado's informant/girlfriend
- Matthew Del Negro as Grady Torrance, Machado's superior
- Jonathan Banks as Remy Osterman, dangerous criminal
- Dylan Neal as Washburn Milter

== Development and production ==
Season one promotional poster; L–R: Polaha, Carbonell, Gellar, and Gruffudd.

The pilot was announced in early 2011 for CBS. Filming for the pilot began in March 2011 in New York City. The pilot was directed by Richard Shepard and written by Eric Charmelo and Nicole Snyder. The remainder of the series was filmed in Los Angeles. Gellar served as executive producer alongside Peter Traugott and Pam Veasey.

In a surprise, the pilot was picked up to series on May 13, 2011, not by CBS, but by their sister network, The CW. This caused ABC Studios to drop out of co-producing the show, citing that it cannot produce a series for the economics of The CW. Warner Bros. Television stepped in as co-producers instead. On the CW's 2011-12 schedule the series was paired with 90210 and aired Tuesday nights at 9:00 pm Eastern/8:00 pm Central. The network initially ordered thirteen episodes.

The series premiered on September 13, 2011. On October 12, 2011, the series was picked up for a full season of 22 episodes.

=== Casting ===
Casting announcements for the series began in January 2011. First to be cast was Sarah Michelle Gellar, who also served as executive producer. Gellar plays Bridget and her twin sister Siobhan Martin. Gellar said, "The joke is that I'm playing five characters" – Bridget and Siobhan in the present, both women in flashbacks, and "Shivette" (which it says on her chair on set), Bridget impersonating Siobhan. The series was Gellar's return to television following the end of Buffy the Vampire Slayer eight years earlier.

Next to be cast was Nestor Carbonell as Victor Machado, followed by Ioan Gruffudd as Siobhan's husband Andrew Martin, and Mike Colter as Bridget's sponsor Malcolm Ward. Tara Summers later joined the series as Gemma Butler. Kristoffer Polaha was the last actor to be cast in March 2011, as Henry Butler.

It was reported on July 19, 2011, that Jaime Murray had been cast as Olivia, Andrew's business partner, who first appeared in episode two and became a recurring character. On July 26, 2011, it was announced that Zoey Deutch had been recast as Juliet, Siobhan's step-daughter and Andrew's daughter. In August, several other recurring roles were cast.

Justin Bruening would be joining Ringer as a recurring character named Tyler, who will pursue Siobhan; Billy Miller as John Delario, who met Bridget during her NA meetings; Jason Dohring as Mr. Carpenter, a teacher at the high school Siobhan's step-daughter Juliet attends; and Gage Golightly was cast in a recurring role as Tessa, "a tough teenager who tangles with Siobhan's step-daughter Juliet (Zoey Deutch) at her new inner-city school". On September 3, Nicole Gale Anderson revealed on her official Twitter that she joined Ringer and will play the role of Monica. Mädchen Amick has been cast as Greer Sheridan, Siobhan's old friend. On October 26, it was announced that Andrea Roth has been cast to play Catherine, Andrew's ex-wife and Juliet's mother. Brody Hutzler was cast as Greer Sheridan's husband Jason.

=== Music ===
The show mostly broadcasts indie music. During the Pilot, in order to accentuate the neo-noir aspect of the show, the 1960 song "I Fall to Pieces" by Patsy Cline and a cover of the 1970 song "25 or 6 to 4" by Pacifika were played during key scenes. Later in the season, along with "Glory Box" by Portishead, "Video Games" was featured for the first time on prime spot on Ringer on September 28, 2011 during a pivotal scene. Adele's song "Set Fire To The Rain" was used for the promotional campaign of the show and "Rumour Has It" during the last scene of the mid-season finale. The song "Riverside" by the Alfred Hitchcock lover, Agnes Obel is played during Episode 12 and another Lana Del Rey song, "Blue Jeans", was played on February 14, 2012 during the last scene of the episode. The new Regina Spektor single, "All the Rowboats", was featured on Episode 17. Season one ended with a song from the rock band The Black Keys called "She's Long Gone".

The main title music was composed by Gabriel Mann, who also scored the pilot and the first four episodes; Mark Snow assumed scoring duties thereafter.

== Episodes ==
No.	Title	Directed by	Written by	Original release date	U.S. viewers (millions)
1	"Pilot"	Richard Shepard	Eric Charmelo & Nicole Snyder	September 13, 2011	2.84
Bridget Kelly (Sarah Michelle Gellar), a recovering drug addict, witnesses a murder committed by Bodaway Macawi and several members of his gang. FBI agent Victor Machado (Nestor Carbonell) assures her of her safety, but she escapes from her hometown in Wyoming and takes refuge in New York City with her estranged, high-society twin sister, Siobhan Martin (Gellar). After the mysterious disappearance of Siobhan during a boat outing, Bridget – believing her sister committed suicide – assumes her sister's identity in order to hide from the FBI and the mob. In the midst of the renovation of Siobhan's loft, Bridget is attacked by an unidentified man. After killing her attacker in self-defense, she realizes he was a hit man sent to kill Siobhan, who is revealed to still be alive and well in Paris. Siobhan receives a call from someone informing her that they have a problem because Bridget is still alive.
2	"She's Ruining Everything"	Rob Bailey	Eric Charmelo & Nicole Snyder	September 20, 2011	1.94
Machado chooses to stay in New York City to continue his research of Siobhan. Bridget, while trying to hide the body of her attacker, confides in her Narcotics Anonymous sponsor Malcolm Ward (Mike Colter); together they develop a getaway plan for her. Later, Bridget manages to stash the body in a trunk in the loft while workers are preparing for a cocktail party to take place there that evening. During the party, the hit man’s ringing cell phone interrupts a speech, and Bridget retrieves it without anyone seeing inside the trunk. The fighting escalates between Siobhan's best friend, Gemma (Tara Summers), and her husband, Henry (Kristoffer Polaha). Bridget starts to sneak out to leave town in the middle of the night but encounters Siobhan’s rebellious stepdaughter, Juliet (Zoey Deutch), suffering the aftermath of a night of partying, and the two unexpectedly bond. Siobhan is hiding out in Paris with an unknown agenda. Bridget decides not to run, and returns to the loft to deal with the hit man’s corpse but discovers it is missing from the trunk.
3	"If You Ever Want a French Lesson"	Allan Arkush	Hank Chilton	September 27, 2011	1.98
Bridget is getting closer to finding Siobhan's killer by checking his cell phone’s call history, and comes across compromising information about Andrew in the process. Meanwhile, Agent Machado is still in New York City, hunting Bridget, unaware that Bridget is posing as Siobhan. Henry and Gemma have another crisis, but this time regarding their investment in Andrew's hedge fund. In Wyoming, Malcolm is abducted by the sadistic gangster, Bodaway Macawi, who tortures Malcolm to force him to give up Bridget's whereabouts, which he doesn’t. Elsewhere, while Siobhan continues living her solitary life in Paris and basking in the freedom from her old life, she encounters Tyler (Justin Bruening), a charming banker who is working for one of Andrew's European branches.
4	"It's Gonna Kill Me, But I'll Do It"	Jean de Segonzac	Cathryn Humphris	October 4, 2011	1.50
Bridget, Andrew, Gemma, and Henry head to the Hamptons to celebrate Siobhan's birthday, where Bridget reflects on the rough past she and her sister experienced. In Paris, Siobhan uses her feminine charm to continue to lure Tyler closer to benefit her hidden motives for Bridget and Andrew. While Agent Machado uncovers crucial pieces of information, Bridget's situation worsens when secrets of her own are revealed, leaving the consequences of her lies unknown and in the hands of Gemma.
5	"A Whole New Kind of Bitch"	Janice Cooke	Shintaro Shimosawa	October 11, 2011	1.71
After Bridget confides her secret in Gemma, she asks Bridget a tricky favor. Henry's writing career is swaying while Andrew and Juliet's relationship is not getting any better. Bridget, on the other hand, is meeting another NA sponsor, Charlie (Billy Miller), in a desperate attempt to stay sober. Meanwhile, the captive Malcolm is put in a position that tests his sobriety after Bodaway forces heroin into him, in another attempt to get him to tell where Bridget is. Gemma disappears and blood is seen all over the wall and floor in her house.
6	"The Poor Kids Do It Everyday" [sic]	Jerry Levine	Robert Doherty	October 18, 2011	1.81
Agent Machado focuses his attention on Bodaway Macawi as he investigates Malcolm's disappearance. In New York, Bridget and Henry are placed in a sticky situation, trying to find out who murdered Gemma. Juliet runs into trouble with a bully, Tessa (Gage Golightly), at her new school but is helped out by her teacher, Mr. Carpenter (Jason Dohring).
7	"Oh Gawd, There's Two of Them?"	Eriq La Salle	Pam Veasey	November 1, 2011	1.80
As the police begin questioning them about Gemma's disappearance, Bridget is forced to reveal to Andrew and Henry that she has a twin. She also asks Charlie for his help in finding Gemma. Unknown to Bridget, Charlie's real name is John Delario, and he is both Siobhan's contact and Gemma's attacker. Meanwhile, Malcolm escapes from Bodaway's thugs and heads to New York. After Bridget sees Malcolm, she faints and hits her head. Then at the hospital, the doctor orders an ultrasound to check on the baby and they find out she isn’t pregnant. Bridget claims to have had some bleeding but didn’t realize it was a miscarriage.
8	"Maybe We Can Get a Dog Instead?"	Nathan Hope	Jay Faerber	November 8, 2011	1.75
Andrew overhears Bridget telling Juliet they won’t be trying for another baby. After Juliet flirts with Mr. Carpenter, he transfers her out of his class. Malcolm arrives in New York and is confronted by Agent Machado. Tyler goes to New York on business and meets Bridget, who he assumes is Siobhan/Cora. He calls Siobhan in Paris later to confront her. She tries to convince Tyler to talk when they’re both back in Paris (even though she never left), but he tells her she isn’t welcome to return to his hotel room.
9	"Shut Up and Eat Your Bologna"	Scott White	Bob Berens	November 15, 2011	1.83
Bridget realizes she's growing fond of Andrew. Henry finds himself bonding with Andrew's business partner, Olivia. Malcolm has doubts about Bridget's new NA sponsor, and Bridget decides to meet Siobhan's therapist, Dr. Anabel Morris (Merle Dandridge), in order to gain insight into her sister's life and learns that Siobhan sometimes went by the alias Cora Farell. Elsewhere, Gemma is being held captive by Delario in his basement.
10	"That's What You Get for Trying to Kill Me"	Stuart Gillard	Eric Charmelo & Nicole Snyder	November 29, 2011	1.60
In New York, Bridget and Malcolm discover and inform the police that "Charlie" is holding Gemma. Upon realizing he is close to being caught, he tells Siobhan he wants double his pay, otherwise he will kill Gemma. Bridget and Andrew get even closer, while Juliet continues to dangerously flirt with her teacher Mr. Carpenter. She also told her new friend, Andrea (Chelsea Tavares), that he raped her. While in Paris, Siobhan uses lies to try to fix things with Tyler. In Wyoming, thanks to an informant (Amber Benson), Agent Machado discovers someone on the force is passing information to Bodaway. Delario kills Gemma even though Siobhan told him not to, and Siobhan travels to New York to stop Delario from killing Gemma. When she finds out it is too late, she shoots Delario because he killed Gemma, and to make sure he doesn't hurt anyone else.
11	"It Just Got Normal"	Jeff T. Thomas	Cathryn Humphris	January 31, 2012	1.40
While the relationship between Bridget and Andrew grows more intimate, Bridget learns about the alleged rape of Juliet, leading to a confrontation between her and Mr. Carpenter. Since the murders of Gemma and Delario, Siobhan has decided to remain in New York for a while and tries to learn more information about Bridget and her former life with a little help from an unsuspecting Tyler. Back in Wyoming, Agent Machado interrogates Jimmy and learns some new information, putting Bridget's cover as Siobhan at risk, and uncovers some news about Malcolm. Back in New York, Bridget offers to host a fundraiser that her friend, Greer (Mädchen Amick), is holding for Juliet's school and discovers that Greer knew one of Siobhan's deep dark secrets. Meanwhile, Malcolm decides to work for Andrew at Martin/Charles in order to keep an eye on him, and Henry mourns the death of his wife. Siobhan discovers that Bridget has settled into her former life more easily than Siobhan expected and she is determined to change that by interacting with everyone to turn them against her ... and being careful not to run into Bridget, who still does not know that Siobhan is still alive nor of her evil agenda.
12	"What Are You Doing Here, Ho-Bag?"	Jerry Levine	Hank Chilton	February 7, 2012	1.18
Juliet's mother, Catherine (Andrea Roth), is back in town to support her daughter during her lawsuit, but she is causing all kinds of trouble by messing with the whole family. The real Siobhan is coping with Henry and Tyler while selling Bridget's engagement ring to buy a fake passport. Meanwhile, Detective Machado is trying to get information from Jimmy. Bridget investigates the Pivoine Hotel mystery and ends up hearing about some guy named Solomon. Henry is on to Siobhan who he thinks is in reality Bridget. Juliet's rape story is put into question when a tape is discovered showing her hitting on Mr. Carpenter. In prison, Jimmy is making a pact with Bodaway to get out, revealing where Bridget is while Bridget finds out that Siobhan went to Wyoming before she reached out for help. Against all odds, Tessa shows up at the Martins, claiming she was also raped by Mr. Carpenter. Siobhan finally shows Henry the truth that Bridget is the one living the lie with Andrew, and that she is still pregnant with his child.
13	"It's Easy to Cry When This Much Cash Is Involved"	Guy Bee	Story by : Shintaro Shimosawa; Teleplay by : Shintaro Shimosawa, Eric Charmelo & Nicole Snyder	February 14, 2012	1.10
Bridget decides to enlist Solomon's (Sean Patrick Thomas) help in order to retrace Siobhan's last steps and discovers her connection to Delario. Meanwhile, Juliet's trial against Mr. Carpenter is dismissed when Tessa admits she lied about him attacking her, and after he attempts to sue Andrew, he is given a substantial amount of money to settle out of court. It is then revealed it was a set-up to get Juliet's trust fund Andrew had pulled, with Mr. Carpenter and Tessa getting a cut of the money. Elsewhere, Henry is blackmailed by Olivia to bring his father-in-law, wealthy lawyer, Tim Arbogast, as a client at Martin/Charles. On the other hand, Siobhan struggles to keep everything together as Henry and Tyler become suspicious that she is using both of them, and Bridget continues to inadvertently ruin her, as yet, unclear plans.
14	"Whores Don't Make That Much"	Janice Cooke	Robert Doherty	February 21, 2012	1.25
Following her investigations from the last episode, Bridget takes Malcolm to Siobhan's secret office only to find it empty. Back in the Martin's apartment, Bridget gets a call that causes her to remember what drove her apart from her sister. Flashbacks from seven years ago reveal Siobhan's troubled relationship with Dylan (Misha Collins), an ex-boyfriend who dumped her after she got pregnant, but who wanted to prove that he was a changed man a few years later. Bridget, who is babysitting Siobhan's son, Sean, allows Dylan to take Sean out just for one day despite Siobhan forbidding it. On their way home, Dylan asks Bridget if she can support him when he files to be Sean's legal guardian, and a car hits them in the middle of the road, killing Sean in the process. In the present day, Bridget, as Siobhan, forgives Dylan after understanding that what happened was an accident, and not necessarily their fault. In the meantime, after finding out that Henry has the key to Siobhan's safe deposit box, Malcolm decides to keep an eye on Henry. Juliet's scheme takes a dark path when Tessa is robbed and brutally attacked after buying a car with her cut of the money; Juliet suspects Mr. Carpenter is the culprit. She then tells her father that she is willing to live with her mother in Miami for a "change of scenery." That leads to the revelation that Catherine was the one who had the idea for the scheme.
15	"P.S. You're an Idiot"	Allan Arkush	Bob Berens	February 28, 2012	1.15
Andrew asks Bridget (thinking she is Siobhan) to renew their vows and they begin planning a wedding ceremony, with Juliet as the maid of honor. Siobhan, visiting an OB/GYN in Paris, learns she is having twins but doesn't tell Henry that the conception date means the baby may be Andrew's. Malcolm is fired when he is caught stealing information from Olivia's computer, and later tells Bridget that Andrew's company is running a Ponzi scheme. Catherine is romantically involved with Mr. Carpenter but then steals his money and blackmails him into leaving Juliet alone. It is also revealed that Andrew came up with the Ponzi scheme.
16	"You're Way Too Pretty to Go to Jail"	Joshua Butler	Jay Faerber & Cathryn Humphris	March 6, 2012	1.25
Andrew confides in Bridget (who he thinks is Siobhan) about running a giant Ponzi scheme, which fills her with doubt and fear as she debates on what to do. Meanwhile, it is revealed that Agent Machado's past relationship with his informant, the murder victim/stripper Shaylene Briggs (Nikki DeLoach), was more than professional. Siobhan deceives Malcolm when she pretends to be Bridget in order to remove him from the scene. In Paris, Tyler takes something from Siobhan that is a key piece of evidence in her plot for revenge against Andrew. Andrew tells Olivia that Bridget (acting as Siobhan) is aware of their Ponzi scheme and she suggests they take action to keep Malcolm, Bridget (acting as Siobhan) and Tyler quiet. Henry realizes Bridget knows more than she should, and has to follow Siobhan's orders to keep Bridget from interfering with their plans.
17	"What We Have Is Worth the Pain"	Howard Deutch	Scott Nimerfro	March 13, 2012	1.11
Bridget fears that something has happened to Malcolm when she cannot get in touch with him. Her and Solomon's investigation leads to the hotel he was staying, where she discovers on security footage that Andrew was the last person to see Malcolm before he disappeared. She suspects that Andrew may have also killed Tyler. Solomon reveals to Bridget that he has known all along that she was impersonating Siobhan. Agent Machado arrives back in New York to look for Malcolm and begins to suspect that Andrew may have had a hand in his disappearance. Juliet discovers Catherine was responsible for the attack on Tessa after meeting a young man with a distinctive tattoo on his right arm, by which Tessa identifies him as her assailant. Siobhan travels back to New York, where she admits to Henry the truth about why she faked her own death and why she believes that Andrew and Olivia are the ones behind the attempts on her life.
18	"That Woman's Never Been a Victim Her Entire Life"	Scott White	Hank Chilton	March 20, 2012	1.16
After an attempt made on Bridget's life results in Andrew being shot, Agent Machado is more determined than ever to find out who was responsible and what Bridget (still impersonating Siobhan) knows about it. Henry accuses Siobhan of putting a hit out on Bridget, which Siobhan denies, while Bridget thinks the missing Olivia was behind it as well as the murder of Tyler. Andrew admits to asking Malcolm to leave town and Juliet tells Bridget the truth about her mother.
19	"Let's Kill Bridget!"	Jerry Levine	Jay Faerber & Bob Berens	March 27, 2012	1.11
Henry grows impatient with Siobhan's plan, and gives her an ultimatum: to let go of her murderous revenge plot against both Andrew and Bridget, or they cannot be together. Bridget decides that the only way she will feel safe is if she gives up her charade of impersonating Siobhan and returns to Wyoming to testify against the sadistic Bodaway Macawi. Agent Machado gets suspended from the FBI after he beats up a suspect in full view of witnesses. Later, he gets an idea to make Bodaway Macawi think Bridget's dead, but the plan ends up going down terribly wrong and reveals that Catherine wants Siobhan dead. Henry is arrested for the murder of Tyler Barrett.
20	"If You're Just an Evil Bitch Then Get Over It"	Roger Kumble	Cathryn Humphris	April 3, 2012	1.05
Still posing as Siobhan, Bridget admits to Agent Machado that someone tried to kill her months earlier and she thought it was Andrew. Siobhan tries to bribe the witness against Henry, which ends up complicating matters for them and Bridget. Bridget goes to Henry's apartment, where the very pregnant Siobhan overhears Bridget accuse Henry of Tyler's murder. At the same time, Henry learns that his father-in-law Tim is responsible for his arrest for Tyler's "murder" and also has an agenda to use the flash drive to work for him. Catherine goes to desperate extremes to kill Siobhan by attempting suicide, to play on Juliet's sympathies.
21	"It's Called Improvising, Bitch!"	Janice Cooke	Scott Nimerfro	April 10, 2012	1.10
It is revealed Siobhan manipulating Andrew to evict Catherine from her home is her motive for killing Siobhan. After being caught breaking into John Delario's home, Agent Machado is told by his superior to return to Colorado. Andrew catches Catherine trying to fake Bridget's suicide, so she holds them and Juliet as hostages. Running out of options, Catherine calls Olivia, who is revealed to be her lover. Olivia reluctantly tells Catherine to bring Bridget to her house, so they can run away together. When Catherine and Bridget arrive, Agent Machado arrests Catherine, having heard the conversation at the apartment after Bridget secretly calls him. Meanwhile, the main witness against Henry dies of a drug overdose and Siobhan gives birth to twin girls. Henry asks the nurse for a paternity test, showing his doubts about Siobhan.
22	"I'm the Good Twin"	Eriq La Salle	Eric Charmelo & Nicole Snyder	April 17, 2012	1.20
As the vow renewal nears, Bridget realizes she needs to tell Andrew the truth about who she really is, but worries about losing everything. Jimmy escapes from prison and demands Bridget (whom he believes is Siobhan) compensate him; Bridget finally learns that Siobhan and Delario hired him to scare her into fleeing Wyoming. Bodaway demands Jimmy reveal where Bridget is, but murders him after he does. Agent Machado is deported back to Colorado where he is ordered to stay off the Bodaway case. Believing that Siobhan was responsible for Gemma's death, Tim becomes the new owner of Martin/Charles Inc. and tells Andrew that Siobhan has been having an affair with Henry over the past year. Andrew is furious, cancels the vow renewal and announces that he will be divorcing her. Now forced to do so, Bridget finally tells Andrew and Juliet the truth about who she really is. Unfortunately, they both take the news very badly; Juliet calling Bridget worse than Catherine, and Andrew kicks her out, punches Henry for the affair and he and Juliet retreat to the Hamptons. Henry steals Siobhan's money that she stole from Andrew and kicks her out of his house after discovering he's not the biological father of her twins. Siobhan returns to her old apartment to steal all her jewelry, and is attacked by Bodaway believing she is Bridget. Bridget shows up and, after a brief struggle, kills him thinking he was attacking Juliet. Agent Machado arrives after getting Bridget's call and reassures her that Andrew and Juliet are safe in the Hamptons, while Siobhan is left broke and homeless. Solomon shows Bridget security footage that shows Siobhan was alive on the day of her "suicide" talking with Delario. Bridget angrily confronts Henry, who tells her the truth about her sister. The series ends as a horrified Bridget says: "Siobhan wanted me dead?"

== Promotion ==
Sarah Michelle Gellar, Ioan Gruffudd and Kristoffer Polaha were at the 1st Critics' Choice Television Awards on June 20, 2011 at the Beverly Hills Hotel to support Ringer and receive "The Most Exciting New Series" award.

The series made its debut at Comic-Con 2011 with cast members Sarah Michelle Gellar, Nestor Carbonell, Ioan Gruffudd and Kristoffer Polaha. Executive producer Pam Veasey and co-executive producers Nicole Snyder and Eric Charmelo also appeared. In addition, Gellar was featured in a photo shoot for The Hollywood Reporter entitled Comic-Con: TV's 6 Most Wanted Women.

Two promotional posters for the series were unveiled on July 20, 2011; one with Gellar, Carbonell, Gruffudd and Polaha, and one with only Gellar, both with the tagline "The Ultimate Double Cross". Sarah Michelle Gellar, Nestor Carbonell, Ioan Gruffudd, Kristoffer Polaha and Mike Colter attended "The Television Critics Association Summer Tour" to promote Ringer. Throughout August several Ringer billboards were displayed in Los Angeles, New York and Chicago and two huge mirrors were launched in New York and Los Angeles to allow passersby to create visual doppelgangers of themselves.

On September 1, 2011, a new promotional poster was released with the whole cast. Sarah Michelle Gellar was featured on the cover of the September 2, 2011 Entertainment Weekly with the tagline "The Return (Yay!) of Sarah Michelle Gellar. One of TV's most iconic stars is back with a twisty new drama, Ringer: 'It's what audiences want to see me do – It's Cruel Intentions meets Buffy'". On September 7, 2011, Eric Charmelo, Nicole Snyder, Mike Colter, and Nestor Carbonell were at the Paley Fest 2011: Fall TV Preview Parties in Los Angeles to preview the pilot following an introductory Panel. On September 10, 2011 the whole cast (except Gellar) was at the CW Launch Party. On September 11, 2011, Sarah Michelle Gellar made the cover of The New York VUE, the TV magazine included every Sunday in The Daily News with the tagline "Doubling Back. Sarah Michelle Gellar returns to TV playing twins on Ringer". On September 12, 2011, Sarah Michelle Gellar was on Late Night with Jimmy Fallon and on Regis and Kelly the following day to promote the pilot. On September 26, 2011, Gellar was a guest on Chelsea Lately to promote the series and on Rachael Ray the following day. On October 13, 2011, Gellar was a guest on the late-night talk show Conan and on Jimmy Kimmel Live! on November 14, 2011. On February 6, 2012, Gellar was a guest on Andy Cohen's "Watch What Happens Live" with Ryan Murphy and on the Late Show with David Letterman. The following day she was on the morning show Live! with Kelly and on February 21, 2012 on Rachael Ray.

== Reception ==
=== Critical reception ===
On Metacritic the show has a score of 59 out of 100 based on reviews from 29 critics, indicating "mixed or average" reviews.

For People Weekly, Gellar dominated the show through her presence and performance and "Hers is a true, potent star turn." Boston Herald thought the show "at times straddles camp" but Gellar acts with emotional control and seriousness, preventing it from becoming cartoonish or parody-like. In a review at TV.com, Tim Surette was enthusiastic about the show's pilot, deeming it over-the-top with its "convoluted mystery" and "Outrageous. But potentially delicious fun." After Elton also gave Ringer a positive review, calling it "the single best new show of the year". People Magazine gave the series 4 out of 4 stars. E! News called the show "intense", commending the "film noir-ness" of the show. They described Sarah Michelle Gellar as "awesome" and "fantastic". Their verdict was "watch, watch, watch!" The Insider included Ringer in its list of "10 Best New Fall TV Shows". Matt Mitovich of TVLine gave the pilot a positive review stating, "the set-up is sound, with some loose ends addressed and nice details sprinkled in. Tackling multiple roles, Gellar does a fine job as in-too-deep Bridget, icy Siobhan, and Bridget-as-Siobhan, and the supporting cast presents no weak link." Ringer was one of the Editor's Picks of Yahoo! saying "the first episode delivers so many shocking twists and turns, you won't be able to catch your breath. Heck, we're still catching ours." The New York Post gave a positive review giving 3 out of 4 stars saying the pilot is "so good that it's CBS' bad" for having given away Ringer to the CW. USA Today gave 3 out of 4 stars thanks to "two very good, well-defined Gellar performances" their bottom line was "you've been given a good show, CW. Don't mess it up."

Las Vegas Weekly gave a mixed review, saying it was "a little silly but also juicy and well-acted". The Hollywood Reporter concluded that although Gellar was "projecting gravitas", the show "really doesn't have a lot of weight". Newsday likewise commented that while Sarah Michelle Gellar looks "stunning", the show doesn't fit the network as "it's inert, lackluster and a trifle old-fashioned", and gave it a C+ grade. Matthew Gilbert of ''The Boston Globe was more negative about Ringer, handing it a "D" grade as well as calling the special effects "lousy" and "sloppy", and "the story line – ripped from a cheesy daytime soap".

=== Ratings ===
The pilot episode drew 2.84 million viewers, a 1.2 Adults 18-49 demo rating and a 1.6 in The CW's target demo of Women 18-34. The ratings reached a three-year high for The CW in the Tuesday 9:00pm time slot. The Friday after its debut, The CW broadcast an encore of the pilot episode which drew 1.87 million viewers and a 0.6 Adults 18-49 rating. The mid-season finale drew 1.6 million viewers and a 0.6 Adults 18-49 rating, with DVR figures increasing its 0.6 A18-49 rating by 67% elevating it to 1.0 A18-49 rating.

== Cancellation and aftermath ==
"I don't think anything went wrong with Ringer. I was happy it was there ... The show was well-crafted, well-produced, well-written, but it was a complicated serialized show. After it finished a run in the fall and came back in January, the audience went somewhere else. And it just could not find the 18–34 demo that we hoped."

— Mark Pedowitz, on the cancellation of Ringer.

After a decline in ratings and viewership from the three-month hiatus over the holiday break, it was deemed that Ringer would likely be cancelled. The CW put the Canadian series The L.A. Complex in its time slot after the finale, in hopes that show would produce higher ratings. Ringer was nominated in the E! Save One Show campaign and came in third place. Multiple petitions were thus created, with one that had over 16,000 signatures. After about a month of the show's uncertainty, the CW officially cancelled the series on May 11, 2012.

The show was subsequently nominated for four more awards, including a Teen Choice award for Choice TV Actress in a Drama for Sarah Michelle Gellar, a Zap2it award, and two E! Online awards. The show has now been nominated for sixteen awards, thus quadruple the other freshman shows on the CW; and recently the show became the third-highest-selling TV show on iTunes amongst all CW shows. On May 24, 2012, it was officially revealed that Ringer was the CW's fifth-highest-rated series, with its viewership ratings and demographics beating out the network's renewed series, from fellow programs Nikita, America's Next Top Model, and Gossip Girl in overall viewership.

In January 2023, Gellar revealed that the show ended because she felt that she could not complete another season when she discovered she was pregnant with her second child. Gellar believed that the CW would have picked up the show for another season if she continued.

Later the license for a remake was bought by Lithuanian television and they created a second season of the show called Tobula Kopija.

== Awards and accolades ==
Awards and accolades for Ringer
Year	Award	Category	Recipients and nominees	Outcome
2011	Critics' Choice Television Awards	Most Exciting New Series	Ringer	Won
2011	E! Golden Tater Awards	New Fall Show You're Most Excited For	Ringer	Won
2011	EW Entertainers of the Year	Favorite TV Actress	Sarah Michelle Gellar	Nominated
2011	Virgin Media TV Awards (UK)	Best Actress	Sarah Michelle Gellar	Nominated
2011	Virgin Media TV Awards (UK)	Best Drama	Ringer	Nominated
2011	TV.com's Best of 2011	Favorite Guilty Pleasure	Ringer	Nominated
2012	People's Choice Awards	Favorite New TV Drama	Ringer	Nominated
2012	NAACP Image Award	Outstanding Writing in a Dramatic Series	Pam Veasey ("Oh Gawd, There's Two of Them?")	Nominated
2012	ICG Publicists Awards	Best Publicity Campaign in TV (Maxwell Weinberg Awards)	Ringer (CBS Television Studios)	Nominated
2012	Pop Heart Awards (France)	Best New US TV Series	Ringer	Won
2012	The PRISM Awards	Best Drama Series Multi-Episode Storyline – Substance Use	Ringer ("Pilot" / "She's Ruining Everything" / "A Whole New Kind of Bitch")	Nominated
2012	TV Guide Fan Favorites Awards	Favorite Guilty Pleasure	Ringer	Won
2012	Teen Choice Awards	Choice TV Actress: Drama	Sarah Michelle Gellar	Nominated
2012	Zap2it Awards	Best Actor Playing Two Characters on One Show	Sarah Michelle Gellar	Nominated
2012	E! Golden Remotes Awards	Star You'll Miss The Most	Sarah Michelle Gellar	Won
2012	E! Golden Remotes Awards	Show You'll Miss The Most	Ringer	Won
2012	EW TV Awards - Best of 2012	Best Set Dressing	The ginormous portrait of Siobhan (Sarah Michelle Gellar) on Ringer	Won
2012	TV Guide Best of the Year	TV's Best Actress of 2012	Sarah Michelle Gellar	Nominated

== International broadcasts ==
Sky Living has picked up the series in the UK, Louisa Forsyth, acquisitions manager at BSkyB said of the pick-up, "Securing Ringer exclusively for Sky Living demonstrates yet again our commitment to owning the very best in primetime US drama". The first season will start airing from September 29, 2011. In Canada, it will air on Global Television Network starting September 16, 2011. On July 28, 2011, it was announced that Mediaset España Comunicación has bought the rights to air Ringer in Spain, and it aired on April 15, 2012 on Telecinco. On August 25, 2011, Television Business International announced that the French Group M6 has renewed its output deal with CBS, which includes Ringer. In Australia Ringer also aired on Network Ten on October 9, 2011, but has since been dropped and moved to its sister channel, Eleven on February 20, and airs Monday Nights at 10:30pm as of the March 12, 2012. Studio Universal bought the exclusive rights for Latin America (Brazil, Argentina, Colombia, Mexico, Peru, Uruguay, Venezuela, and Chile among others) and RAI bought the rights for Italy to broadcast Ringer on channel Rai 2 in 2012. DSTV has started to broadcast Ringer in South Africa on M-Net Series. The series has been shown in Portugal since October 2011 on pay-TV channel TV Séries under title name 'Vida Dupla' (Double Life) and is available on video on demand in Sweden since March 1, 2012 on TV4 Play. Ringer will air in 18 countries in Asia through AXN Beyond starting March 15, 2012 and in India on Big CBS Love starting April 2, 2012. In the middle east, Ringer was picked by MBC4, airing with Arabic subtitles. In Israel, the series is broadcast by Hot 3 starting September 28, 2012. In the Netherlands, the series is broadcast by Net5 starting September 4, 2012.

== See also ==
- The Lying Game
