= Darius Marder =

American film director and screenwriter

- Born: 1973 or 1974 (age 51–52)
- Occupations: Film director, film editor, screenwriter
- Years active: 2007–present
- Known for: Sound of Metal (2019)
- Relatives: Abraham Marder (brother)

Darius Marder is an American film director, screenwriter, and editor from Massachusetts. He is known for directing and co-writing Sound of Metal, for which he was nominated for Best Original Screenplay at the 93rd Academy Awards. The film received a total of six nominations at the Academy Awards, including Best Picture, winning Best Editing and Best Sound. Marder also edited the Academy Award-winning documentary Freeheld (2007).

== Early life ==
Marder grew up in Conway, Massachusetts with his parents and four siblings. His parents, Lauri and Efrem Marder, both artists from New York, lived according to the teachings of the Russian philosopher and mystic George Gurdjieff. The family lived there with about 35 other followers, which Marder has described as a "beautiful experience." Marder performed poorly in high school, and did not attend college. At 18, he began teaching literature to middle school students. He later started a sushi catering business in Vermont.

Marder's great-grandfather was raised in an orthodox Jewish community in Austria. Marder was particularly close to his paternal grandmother, Dorothy Marder, who was a gay activist. After taking an antibiotic for a bout of pancreatitis, Dorothy became profoundly deaf. Her sudden deafness had a significant impact on Darius.

== Career ==
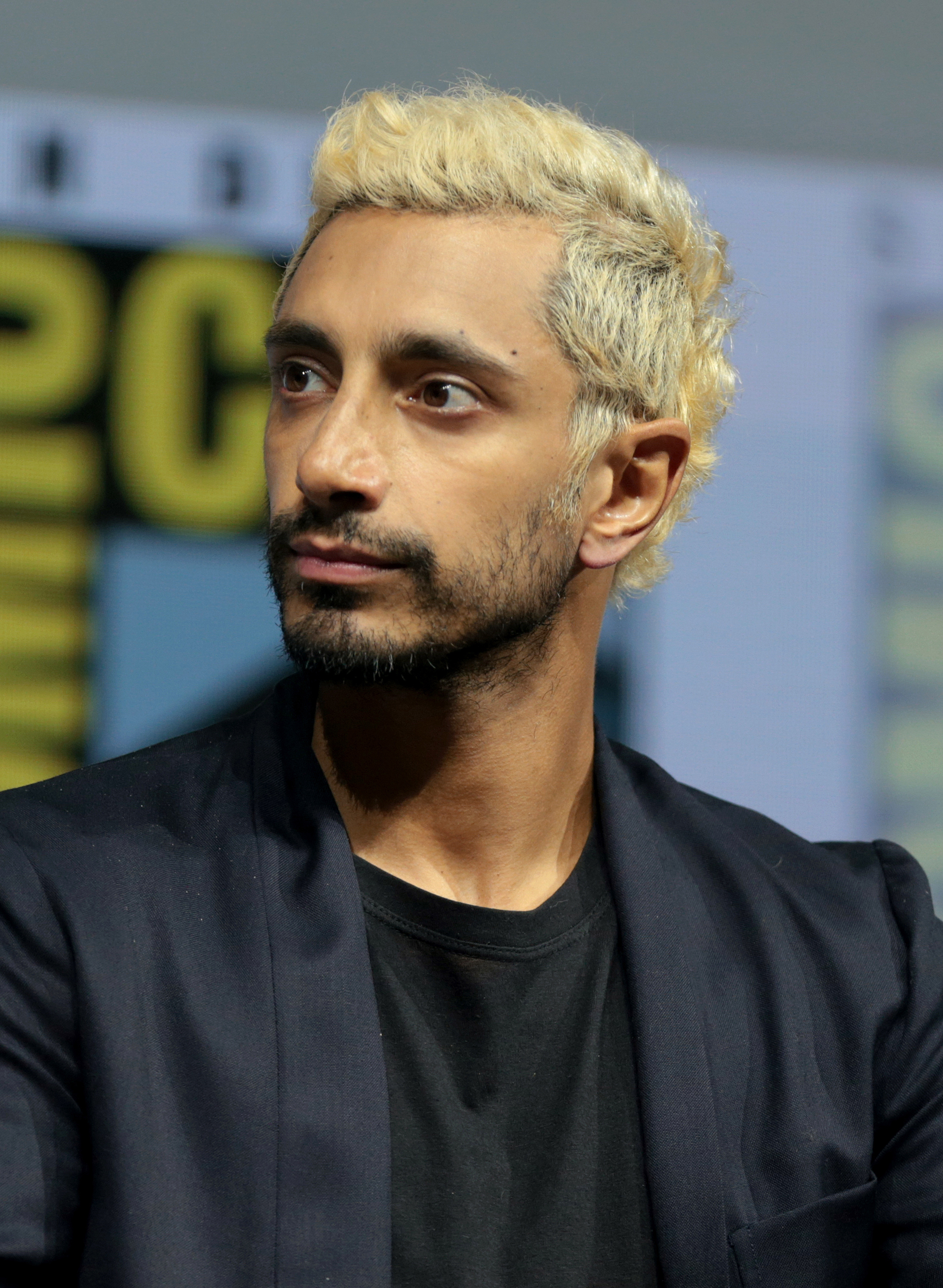
Riz Ahmed (pictured) stars as the lead in Marder's film Sound of Metal (2019).

Once Marder had started his own family, he moved with his then wife and two children to New York, where their youngest child was born shortly afterwards. He worked as a chef and food stylist, while also writing, producing, and filming various projects. Marder met producer Dan Campbell, who told him about the life story of treasure hunter Lance Larson. Marder decided to make a film about the man. He made his directorial debut with the documentary Loot, which premiered at the 2008 Los Angeles Film Festival where it won the Best Documentary Feature award. The documentary focuses on Larson as he travels with two World War II veterans, Andrew Seventy and Darrel Ross, in search of the stolen materials in Europe that they buried after the war.

Marder co-wrote The Place Beyond the Pines (2012) with his friend Derek Cianfrance and Ben Coccio. Cianfrance had previously been working on the hybrid documentary film Metalhead, which centered on a metal drummer whose eardrums are ruptured and then becomes deaf. The film featured the members of the band Jucifer portraying themselves. However, the project was later scrapped and abandoned, until Marder took it up, resulting in the fictionalized and distinct narrative film Sound of Metal. Starring Riz Ahmed, the film premiered at the 2019 Toronto International Film Festival and was released by Amazon Studios in 2020. The film was shot in 2018 in Marder's native Massachusetts, primarily in Ipswich, but also in Boston, Lynn, Cambridge, Danvers, Framingham, Lawrence, Malden, Rowley, and Topsfield. Marder, his brother Abraham Marder, and Cianfrance received an Academy Award for Best Original Screenplay nomination for the film. The film received a total of six nominations at the 93rd Academy Awards, including Best Picture, Best Actor (Ahmed) and Best Supporting Actor (Paul Raci), Best Sound, and Best Film Editing. The film won two Oscars for Best Editing and Best Sound.

== Personal life ==
Marder moved back to Massachusetts after living in New York City for 25 years. He now lives in Ashfield.

In 2014, Marder appeared on the hidden camera show Impractical Jokers as an unwitting passer-by to James Murray and Sal Vulcano's challenge; a discussion about whose story of losing their virginity was more embarrassing.

== Filmography ==
| Year | Title | Director | Writer | Notes |
|---|---|---|---|---|
| 2008 | Loot | Yes | | Documentary; Also editor |
| 2012 | The Place Beyond the Pines | No | Yes | |
| 2019 | Sound of Metal | Yes | Yes | |

As editor

| Year | Title | Notes |
|---|---|---|
| 2007 | Freeheld | Additional editor |
| 2010 | Stranger Danger | Short film |
| 2011 | Girl Model | |
| 2012 | Words of Witness | Additional editor |

== Select awards ==
Academy Awards

- 2021: Nomination for the Academy Award for Best Original Screenplay (Sound of Metal)

Chicago Film Critics Association Awards

- 2020: Nomination for the Milos Stehlik Award for Promising Filmmaker (Sound of Metal)

Critics' Choice Movie Awards

- 2021: Nomination for Best Screenplay (Sound of Metal)

Deauville American Film Festival

- 2020: Competition selection (Sound of Metal)

Directors Guild of America Award

- 2021: Winner of Outstanding Directing – First-Time Feature Film (Sound of Metal)

Hollywood Critics Association Awards

- 2021: Winner of Best Male Director (Sound of Metal)
- 2021: Nomination for Best First Feature (Sound of Metal)
- 2021: Nomination for Best Original Screenplay (Sound of Metal)

Independent Spirit Awards

- 2009: Nomination for the Truer Than Fiction Award (Loot)
- 2021: Winner of Best First Feature (Sound of Metal)

LA Film Festival

- 2008: Winner of Best Documentary Feature (Loot)

PEN Center USA Literary Awards

- 2014: Winner of Best Screenplay (The Place Beyond the Pines)

San Diego Film Critics Society Awards

- 2021: Nomination for Best Director (Sound of Metal)
- 2021: Runner-up for Best Original Screenplay (Sound of Metal)

Satellite Awards

- 2021: Nomination for Best Director (Sound of Metal)

Toronto International Film Festival

- 2019: Nomination for the Platform Prize (Sound of Metal)

Washington D.C. Area Film Critics Association Awards

- 2021: Nomination for Best Original Screenplay (Sound of Metal)

Writers Guild of America Awards

- 2021: Nomination for Best Original Screenplay (Sound of Metal)

Zurich Film Festival

- 2019: Winner of the Golden Eye for Best International Feature Film (Sound of Metal)
