= The Angel of Vine =

Audio drama

The Angel of Vine is a 10 episode neo-noir scripted podcast starring Joe Manganiello.

== Background ==
The show was produced by Vox Populi. The show is a scripted neo-noir podcast. The podcast debuted on November 14, 2019 and released episodes every Wednesday until January 16, 2020. The 10 part series was created by Oliver Vaquer and Ryan Martz. Misha Collins is in four episodes.

Season two was intended to be released in 2020. The second season was going to be co-produced by iHeartMedia. Kevin Pollack and Patton Oswalt will star in season 2.

The show follows a journalist named Oscar Simons who becomes obsessed with a cold case. Simons finds audio tapes from a private detective in the 1950s who solved a murder that happened in hollywood. The cold case was called the mystery of "The Angel of Vine". An actress named Marlene Marie Evans was the victim of the cold case.

=== Cast and characters ===
- Alan Tudyk as Samuel Tensch
- Alfred Molina as Leonard Shaw
- Ally Ruddy as Marlene Marie Evans
- Camilla Luddington as Beth Turner
- Coco Lamoureux as Young Phyllis
- Constance Zimmer as Phyllis Briggs-Turner
- Courtenay Taylor as Virginia
- Cree Summer as Dottie Hess
- Delaney Hillan as Imogen
- Eric Bauza as David Garcia
- Imari Williams as Edgar Stills
- Joe Manganiello as Hank Briggs
- Kari Wahlgren as Diane
- Khary Payton as Fish
- Mary Elizabeth Mcglynn as Alice Evans
- Matthew Mercer as Sonny
- Mike Colter as Ed Hess
- Misha Collins as Adler Harrison
- Nolan North as Irwin Fogelman
- Oliver Vaquer as Oscar Simons
- Patrick Ezell as Dewey Bowers
- Philip Mershon as Mark
- Rebecca Field as Gladys
- Steve Blum as Roy Evans
- Tom Sibley as Charlie
- Travis Willingham as Tiny
- William Demeritt as Frank
