= Words of Witness =

- Directed by: Mai Iskander
- Produced by: Mai Iskander
- Cinematography: Mai Iskander
- Release dates: April 3, 2012 (Germany); February 12, 2012 (Germany)
- Running time: 70 min
- Country: United States
- Languages: English; Arabic

Words of Witness is a 2012 feature-length documentary film produced and directed by Mai Iskander. follows 22-year-old journalist Heba Afify as she navigates Egypt's revolution and the rigid boundaries of her concerned mother to examine the struggles, hopes and fears of a people on the brink of democracy.

== Release ==
"Words of Witness" world premiere was with the Berlin International Film Festival, Germany on February 12, 2012. The documentary had its North American premiere at the Los Angeles Film Festival, June 17, 2012. The film was also part of the 2012 Human Rights Watch Film Festival.

== Synopsis ==
"Every time 22-year-old journalist Heba Afify heads out to cover the historical events shaping her country's future, her mother is compelled to remind her, "I know you are a journalist, but you're still a girl!" Defying cultural norms and family expectations, Heba takes to the streets to report on an Egypt in turmoil, using tweets, texts and Facebook posts. Her coming of age, political awakening and the disillusionment that follows, mirrors that of a nation seeking the freedom to shape its own destiny, dignity and democracy."

== Critical reception ==
In his review in The Los Angeles Times, Gary Goldstein said ""'Arab Spring' blooms in Words of Witness crucial story of modern revolution... The concise documentary 'Words of Witness' proves a vivid snapshot of the hectic, yet hopeful weeks in early 2011 following the end of Egyptian President Hosni Mubarak's 30-year-dictatorship, the start of the military's interim rule and the nation's rocky road toward democracy... Iskander captures loaded events with hand-held, you-are-there vitality."

In a review in The Wall Street Journal, A.J. Goldman said "Raw and fascinating... ‘Words of Witness’ captures the hope, yearning, anxiety and fear of people in a country undergoing extreme political and social turmoil."

In her review in Huffington Post, E. Nina Rothe said "Beautiful inspiring story...Egypt's government announced that an Islamist has won Egypt's first competitive presidential election. The superb new documentary 'Words of Witness' sheds much needed light on how Egyptians got to this point."

In her review in Film Journal International, Maria Garcia said "Riveting documentary..."

In her review in Slant Magazine, Ela Bittencort said "Stirring..."

== Awards ==
- Best of the Festival Jury Award 2012 at the One World Film Festival Documentary Awards.
- Heroine Award and Best of Human Rights Issues 2012 (winner) at the Montana Cine International Film Festival Documentary Awards.
- First Amendment Award 2012 (winner) at the Santa Rosa Film Festival.
