= Tara Summers =

English actress (born 1979)

- Born: 19 December 1979 (age 46); London, England, UK
- Occupation: Actress
- Years active: 2003–present
- Relatives: Fritzi Gordon (grandmother)

Tara Summers (born 19 December 1979) is an English actress.

Summers was educated at Heathfield St Mary's School, in Berkshire. She later attended Brown University, where she graduated with a B.A. in history in 2001. Her grandmother was Fritzi Gordon, an Austrian-born WBF World Grand Master bridge player with four world titles.

Summers has written and starred in a one-woman theatrical show, Gypsy of Chelsea. The play is the story of her childhood, charting her mother's turbulent journey from cocaine addiction to recovery.

She has appeared in several films, including Factory Girl in 2006. In 2007 and 2008, Summers starred on TV as Katie Lloyd on Boston Legal.

Summers was the director in the video for Snow Patrol's 2011 single "Called Out in the Dark". She also appeared in the first half of the first season of The CW's mystery drama series Ringer. In 2014, she appeared as Leanne Zander in the Fox dramedy series Rake.

Summers married Anthony Shrubb in June 2025.

== Filmography ==
=== Film ===
| Year | Title | Role | Notes |
|---|---|---|---|
| 2003 | What a Girl Wants | Noelle | |
| 2004 | Alfie | Carol | |
| 2005 | The Jacket | Nurse Nina | |
| 2005 | Vado a messa | Frances | Short film |
| 2006 | Rabbit Fever | Ally | |
| 2006 | Factory Girl | Brigid Polk | |
| 2008 | Love Lies Bleeding | Det. Alice Sands | Video |
| 2010 | Luster | Rachel | |
| 2010 | Stephany + Me | | Video short |
| 2010 | Inspired by Bret Easton Ellis | | Short film |
| 2010 | The Lake Effect | Natalie | |
| 2012 | Here Comes the Night | Simone | |
| 2012 | Hitchcock | Rita Riggs | |
| 2017 | Confessions of a Teenage Jesus Jerk | | |
| 2018 | Driven | Molly Gibson | |
| 2020 | Major Arcana | Sierra | |
| 2022 | Spoiler Alert | Mrs. Ausiello | |

=== Television ===
| Year | Title | Role | Notes |
|---|---|---|---|
| 2004 | Fooling Hitler | | TV film |
| 2006 | The Wedding Album | Milla Cavendish | TV pilot |
| 2006 | Living the Quake | Lucy Fisher | TV film |
| 2007 | Dirt | Abby | 3 episodes: "The Secret Lives of Altar Girls", "Come Together", "The Sexxx Issue" |
| 2007–2008 | Boston Legal | Katie Lloyd | Main role (33 episodes) |
| 2010 | Damages | Alex Benjamin | Recurring role (5 episodes) |
| 2010 | 15 Minutes | Karen James | TV film |
| 2011 | Private Practice | Janel Chase | Episode: "If You Don't Know Me By Now" |
| 2011 | Ringer | Gemma Butler | Recurring role (8 episodes) |
| 2012 | CSI: NY | Dr. Carly Emerson | Episode: "Clue: SI" |
| 2012 | Sons of Anarchy | Karen Dunhill | 2 episodes: "Crucifixed", "To Thine Own Self" |
| 2013 | Monday Mornings | Allison McDaniels | 2 episodes: "Pilot", "Deus Ex Machina" |
| 2014 | Rake (US) | Leanne Zander | Regular cast member |
| 2014 | Stalker | Tracy Wright | Recurring Role |
| 2015 | You're the Worst | Lexi | Episode: "LCD Soundsystem" |
| 2016–2017 | Mercy Street | Anne Hastings | |
| 2016 | Lucifer | Anne | Episode: "Pops" |
| 2016 | Madam Secretary | Sophie Adams | Episode: "Tectonic Shift" |
| 2017 | Master of None | Emily | |
| 2018 | The Assassination of Gianni Versace: American Crime Story | Laura Trail | Episode: "Don't Ask, Don't Tell" |
| 2019 | Elementary | Nurse | Episode: "The Further Adventures" |
| 2020, 2024 | Evil | Nurse Linda Bloch | 2 episodes: "Room 320", "How to Slaughter a Pig" |
| 2020 | High Fidelity | Tanya | Episode: "Fun Rob" |
| 2020 | The Good Fight | Edie Ham | Episode: "The Gang Gets a Call from HR" |
| 2022 | Fleishman Is in Trouble | Tess | Episode: "Summon Your Witnesses" |
| 2023 | Extrapolations | Isabel Wick | Episode: "2066: Lola" |
| 2026 | Steal | Sophia | 6 Episodes |
| 2026 | Cupertino | Dr. Marjorie Wellington | Episode: "Harper" |
| 2026 | Maximum Pleasure Guaranteed | Suzie Tell | Recurring role |
