= Loot (2008 film) =

- Directed by: Darius Marder
- Produced by: Dan Campbell, Zebidiah Millett
- Starring: Lance Larson, Darrel Ross, Andrew Seventy
- Cinematography: Anson Call
- Edited by: Darius Marder, Zebidiah Millett
- Release date: 2008
- Running time: 86 minutes
- Country: United States
- Language: English

Loot is a 2008 documentary film directed by Darius Marder. It follows amateur treasure hunter Lance Larson in search of buried treasure from World War II, with the help of the two US war veterans—Darrel Ross and Andrew Seventy—responsible for burying them. A major theme of the film involves the emotional risks of digging up one's past.

The film premiered on HBO2 on May 20, 2009. It won Best Documentary at the 2008 Los Angeles Film Festival.
