= Good God, Y'All! =

- Supernatural episode
- Episode no.: Season 5 Episode 2
- Directed by: Phil Sgriccia
- Written by: Sera Gamble
- Cinematography by: Serge Ladouceur
- Editing by: Tom McQuade
- Production code: 3X5202
- Original air date: September 17, 2009
- Running time: 42 minutes

Guest appearances
- Jim Beaver as Bobby Singer; Titus Welliver as War; Steven Williams as Rufus Turner; Alona Tal as Jo Harvelle; Samantha Ferris as Ellen Harvelle

Episode chronology
← Previous "Sympathy for the Devil"	Next → "Free to be You and Me"
- Supernatural season 5

"Good God, Y'All!" is the second episode of the fifth season of paranormal drama television series Supernatural and the 84th overall. The episode was written by executive producer Sera Gamble and directed by executive producer Phil Sgriccia. It was first broadcast on September 17, 2009, on The CW. In the episode, Sam and Dean watch the aftermath of Lucifer being freed from the Cage while the angels plan a new strategy to stop the Apocalypse.

== Plot ==
Bobby Singer is still reliant on a wheelchair, in the hospital, and hasn't spoken in days. Castiel calls Sam Winchester's cell phone to find out where the boys are – the Enochian sigils he etched into their ribs hides them from all angels, including Castiel. When Bobby tells him to heal him Castiel tells Bobby he can't as he's cut off from heaven. He then says in order to defeat Lucifer, he plans to find God. He says he needs Dean's amulet which apparently burns hot in God's presence.

Meanwhile, Rufus Turner heads to a town he thinks is under attack from demons, based on omens of a polluted river and a falling star. He calls Bobby for help. When Sam and Dean arrive, they find the town deserted. They come across Ellen Harvelle on the street who takes them to a church where she has gathered with her some of the surviving townsfolk. She suspects that the rest of the town is possessed by demons. She tells them that Rufus called her and Jo for help and they got separated while fighting the demons. Dean and Sam go into town for supplies, and while Sam is getting salt from a store, two teenagers with black eyes enter. Sam kills them with Ruby's knife, but appears drawn to the blood.

When Sam and Ellen go to find Jo and Rufus, they are attacked. Ellen escapes, but Sam is captured by Jo and Rufus – who seem to think Sam is possessed. While he is held captive, one of the townspeople reveals that he is War – one of the Four Horseman of the Apocalypse and has tricked the people into thinking everyone is possessed, leading them to attack each other.

Returning, Ellen tells Dean that Jo thought she was possessed because she called her a "black-eyed bitch," and Dean starts to suspect all is not what it seems. Checking the Bible, he works out that these signs and the conflict herald the arrival of War. Shortly after, War, in the guise of a townsman, arrives and insists that they all need to attack the demons. As Dean and Ellen try to calm the panic, War turns the ring on his finger and the townspeople start seeing them as demons and attack. Dean and Ellen flee.

The townspeople form a force. They equip themselves with real bullets because they believe Dean had been a demon all along and lied about the effectiveness of salt. Dean and Ellen reach Jo and Rufus shortly before the townspeople arrive and manage to convince the two there are no demons and it's all the work of War. Dean frees Sam and they rush to catch up with War and cut off the ring that was helping him deceive the townspeople.

After the battle is over, Sam tells Dean that he can't trust himself, and that he needs to take a break from hunting – and Dean. Dean agrees – he can't focus on the job because he is worrying about Sam. He offers Sam the Impala but Sam declines, and hitches a ride out of town.

== Reception ==
=== Viewers ===
The episode was watched by 2.80 million viewers with a 1.2/3 in the 18-49 demographics. This was an 18% decrease in viewership from the season premiere, which was watched by 3.40 million viewers with a 1.4/4 in the 18-49 demographics. This means that 1.2 percent of all households with televisions watched the episode, while 3 percent of all households watching television at that time watched it. Supernatural ranked as the second most watched show on The CW in the day, behind The Vampire Diaries

=== Critical reviews ===
"Good God, Y'All!" received positive reviews. Diana Steenbergen of IGN gave the episode a "great" 8.9 out of 10 and wrote, "Even though the storyline of the demon-possessed town is connected to the larger storyline of the apocalypse, it still functions as a self-contained episode, and writer Sera Gamble does a good job tying all the elements together. However, just like last week, there is a part of the story that falls a little flat. This time it is when we learn that Dean's amulet, the one he has been wearing the entire series and that Sam gave to him when they were children, is actually a talisman that can help Castiel find God. For the second time in as many weeks, the show sets something up that is too convenient to be fully believable, the first being Bobby's possession in the season premiere. It is true that the apocalypse storyline is immense, but they need to be more careful to make the details make sense, and not feel as if they were thrown in to make the plot work."

The A.V. Club's Zack Handlen gave the episode a "B" grade and wrote, "It's not a flawless episode, though; the strong concept at the episode's heart gets short-changed, as do the handful of returning characters. There's also something else I've been thinking about – are we going to start having fun again soon? Supernatural has always had its share of darkness; in the first episode, Sam lost his fiancee to the same demon that killed his mother, which isn't exactly at the top of Sir Chuckles-a-lot's list of Fun Time Party Gags. (He prefers to open with something about dead puppies.) But that darkness is generally leavened by the writers obvious pleasure in playing with horror tropes, and the banter between the heroes. When the show leaves on its serious face for too long, it gets increasingly hard to actually take seriously. It works best when we're getting to snicker with the characters enough that we don't feel the need to start snickering at them."

Jon Lachonis of TV Overmind, wrote, "I pity any writer tasked with following up Eric Kripke on Supernatural, including the always awesome Sera Gamble. The fact is, in the shadow of the master practically anything is going to seem to register a little flat. Such was the case for the second episode of Supernatural's fifth season, Good God Y'all. A perfectly good episode of Supernatural, but a ho-hum follow up to Kripke's cinematic and mythos oozing jumpstart from last week. Let's dissect."
