= Supernatural season 5 =

Supernatural
- Season 5
- DVD cover art
- Showrunner: Eric Kripke
- Starring: Jared Padalecki; Jensen Ackles; Misha Collins
- No. of episodes: 22

Release
- Original network: The CW
- Original release: September 10, 2009 – May 13, 2010

Season chronology
- ← Previous; Season 4 Next → Season 6

The fifth season of Supernatural, an American dark fantasy television series created by Eric Kripke, premiered September 10, 2009, and concluded on May 13, 2010, on The CW. Season five regular cast members include Jared Padalecki, Jensen Ackles and Misha Collins, who was promoted to series regular this season. After the conclusion of this season, Kripke stepped down as showrunner. The fifth season was released on DVD and Blu-ray in region 1 on September 7, 2010. The season follows Sam and Dean as they set out to take down Lucifer, whom Sam had inadvertently released from Hell at the end of the previous season.

Mark Pellegrino plays the role of Lucifer. Paris Hilton guest stars in the episode "Fallen Idols", in which she plays Leshi, a god that takes the form of various well-known faces including herself. The season also features the return of Jo and her mother Ellen Harvelle, as well as hunter Rufus Turner, the Trickster and the prophet Chuck Shurley.

== Cast ==
=== Starring ===
- Jared Padalecki as Sam Winchester / Lucifer
- Jensen Ackles as Dean Winchester
- Misha Collins as Castiel (Note: Only credited for his respective episode appearances.)

=== Special guest star ===
- Paris Hilton as Herself / Leshi

=== Guest stars ===
- Jim Beaver as Bobby Singer
- Mark Pellegrino and Bellamy Young as Lucifer
- Rob Benedict as Chuck Shurley / God
- Kurt Fuller as Zachariah
- Mark A. Sheppard as Crowley
- Jake Abel as Adam Milligan / Michael
- Samantha Ferris as Ellen Harvelle
- Matt Frewer as Pestilence
- Rachel Miner as Meg Masters
- Emily Perkins as Becky Rosen
- Cindy Sampson as Lisa Braeden
- Richard Speight, Jr. as the Trickster / Gabriel
- Alona Tal as Jo Harvelle
- Demore Barnes as Donnie Finnerman / Raphael
- A. J. Buckley as Ed Zeddmore
- Traci Dinwiddie as Pamela Barnes
- Carrie Fleming as Karen Singer
- Jon Gries as Martin Creaser
- Chad Lindberg as Ash
- Julie McNiven as Anna Milton
- Adrianne Palicki as Jessica Moore
- Kim Rhodes as Sheriff Jody Mills
- Matt Cohen as Young John Winchester / Michael
- Chad Everett as an elderly version of Dean Winchester
- Julian Richings as Death
- Samantha Smith as Mary Winchester
- Amy Gumenick as Young Mary Winchester
- Travis Wester as Harry Spangler
- Steven Williams as Rufus Turner
- Michael Shanks as Rob
- Eric Johnson as Brady

== Episodes ==
In this table, the number in the first column refers to the episode's number within the entire series, whereas the number in the second column indicates the episode's number within that particular season. "U.S. viewers in millions" refers to how many Americans who watched the episode live or on the day of broadcast.

No. overall	No. in season	Title	Directed by	Written by	Original release date	Prod. code	U.S. viewers (millions)
83	1	"Sympathy for the Devil"	Robert Singer	Eric Kripke	September 10, 2009	3X5201	3.40
The Apocalypse has begun. Sam and Dean Winchester search for the sword of the archangel Michael, a weapon capable of defeating Lucifer. Zachariah explains that Dean is Michael's "sword" as Michael's destined human vessel. Dean refuses to allow Michael to possess him. Castiel appears and warns Zachariah that the boys are under God's protection. He then hides Sam and Dean from angelic detection and disappears. Meanwhile, Nick, whose family has been slaughtered by a killer, allows himself to be possessed by Lucifer.
84	2	"Good God, Y'All!"	Phil Sgriccia	Sera Gamble	September 17, 2009	3X5202	2.78
Castiel borrows Dean's pendant to locate God, revealing that the angels are hunting him for his betrayal. Bobby sends Sam and Dean to respond to a frantic call from his friend Rufus Turner (Steven Williams), who is in River Pass, Colorado, a town swarming with demons. They meet their old friend Ellen Harvelle (Samantha Ferris), whose daughter Jo has also gone missing. When the three find Jo and Rufus, they appear to be possessed by demons, and strangely, they seem to think Sam, Dean, and Ellen are also possessed. It is later revealed that there are no real demons present, merely illusions brought about by War (Titus Welliver), one of the Four Horsemen of the Apocalypse, to trick panicked people into killing each other. By removing War's ring, they defeat the Horseman and end the chaos. Afterwards, Sam and Dean agree to part ways because neither trusts the other on the job.
85	3	"Free to Be You and Me"	J. Miller Tobin	Jeremy Carver	September 24, 2009	3X5203	2.66
Sam receives a visit from his deceased girlfriend Jessica; he tries to have a normal life by settling down and working at a restaurant under the alias Keith. Meanwhile, Dean teams up with Castiel to track down the archangel Raphael, as Castiel believes Raphael knows God's location. They manage to lure him out, however Raphael claims that God is dead, suspecting Lucifer raised Castiel from the dead. A group of hunters finds Sam and wants him to join in a demon hunt, but Sam refuses. The hunters return defeated and hold Sam's restaurant co-worker hostage, forcing Sam to tell the truth about his involvement in the Apocalypse. Later, Jessica visits again, and it's revealed that it's Lucifer masquerading as her; Lucifer reveals that Sam is his one true vessel to end the world in. Sam refuses to be possessed by the fallen angel, though Lucifer believes that Sam will change his mind in the end.
86	4	"The End"	Steve Boyum	Ben Edlund	October 1, 2009	3X5204	2.60
Sam calls Dean late at night and wants to team up again in the battle of the Apocalypse, but Dean declines. Dean awakens five years in the future, where the Croatoan virus has devastated the world. He learns from Zachariah that it is the result of Dean's refusal to become Michael's vessel. Dean discovers a group of survivors led by his future self, who plans on confronting Lucifer in a showdown using the Colt. It is also revealed that Sam has accepted his role as Lucifer's vessel in the future. After killing Future Dean, Lucifer tells Dean that whatever choices Dean makes, he will always end up in the same situation. Zachariah transports Dean back to his present and persuades Dean again, but Dean refuses, and Castiel saves Dean from Zachariah's wrath just in time. Dean contacts Sam and they reunite, realizing that they are stronger together after seeing the future.
87	5	"Fallen Idols"	James L. Conway	Julie Siege	October 8, 2009	3X5205	2.47
The reunited Sam and Dean visit Canton, Ohio and investigate a string of very strange murders. A man who has found James Dean's car "Little Bastard" is found dead, having crashed into the car windshield. Another man is murdered by someone resembling Abraham Lincoln. Suspecting that the murders are the work of famous ghosts, the brothers discover that the local wax museum curator has been collecting actual artifacts to go along with the wax statues. Although Sam and Dean get rid of the ghosts, the incidents continue when two girls report that Paris Hilton kidnapped their friend. They recheck the bodies and discover strange seeds that lead them to believe it is the work of Leshii, a pagan god, whose forest was cut down in Eastern Europe. Sam and Dean return to the museum to confront Leshii (Paris Hilton), ultimately killing her with an iron axe. Having had trouble trusting Sam throughout these events, Dean agrees to loosen up on his brother.
88	6	"I Believe the Children Are Our Future"	Charles Beeson	Andrew Dabb & Daniel Loflin	October 15, 2009	3X5206	2.58
In Alliance, Nebraska, people are being killed by practical joke devices such as itching powder and joy buzzers. It turns out that an eleven-year-old boy named Jesse is the reason for all this, as whatever he believes has started to become reality. Sam and Dean discover that Jesse was adopted; his biological mother reveals that a demon impregnated her and that she gave Jesse up for adoption at birth. Castiel tells the Winchesters that Jesse is the Antichrist and that they should kill him before Lucifer uses him. Sam and Dean argue with Jesse's biological mother, each attempting to persuade Jesse to side with them. Jesse exorcises the demon from his mother and agrees to leave with the Winchesters. Pretending he wants to say goodbye to his adoptive parents, he goes upstairs and vanishes into thin air.
89	7	"The Curious Case of Dean Winchester"	Robert Singer	Story by : Sera Gamble & Jenny Klein; Teleplay by : Sera Gamble	October 29, 2009	3X5207	2.92
Sam and Dean follow a trail of deaths of people who have mysteriously aged. They discover that a wandering warlock named Patrick has been luring people into playing poker where the stakes are years of life represented by poker chips, and that their friend Bobby has played and lost/aged 25 years. Dean plays Patrick, where he buys in with 50 years, redeeming 25 to undo Bobby's aging, but ultimately loses. Remembering Patrick's ritual on the poker chips, Dean and Sam try to steal the chips, but fail. Later, Patrick's accomplice Lia offers them a spell that would cancel the aging effect, but it requires a sample of Patrick's DNA. Sam attempts to challenge Patrick to swipe the DNA from Patrick's toothpick, but fails as Patrick knows the trick. Sam must then play for real as Dean's lifetime runs out. Sam manages to win back Dean's years, and Lia, who is depressed at outliving her loved ones, plays Patrick and loses so that she can finally be at peace.
90	8	"Changing Channels"	Charles Beeson	Jeremy Carver	November 5, 2009	3X5208	2.65
While investigating a homicide in Wellington, Ohio committed by the Incredible Hulk, Sam and Dean suspect it is the work of the Trickster. Still, when they go to a warehouse location to try to stake him, they find themselves as characters in a television show. They must survive several different shows, including a sexy medical drama, a Japanese game show, a sitcom, and a police procedural, all of which attempt to have the two accept their roles as vessels. They can stake the Trickster, but the scenario continues as Sam is transformed into their Impala and has to act like K.I.T.T. in Knight Rider. Dean and Sam lure the Trickster into a burning circle of holy oil as they suspect he is an angel. The Trickster reveals he is the archangel Gabriel, who fled Heaven long before. He grew tired of watching his brothers fight each other and wanted Sam and Dean to accept their roles as vessels to end the Apocalypse. Dean still refuses to become a vessel, but before they leave, he frees Gabriel from his trap and accuses him of being too afraid to stand up against his family.
91	9	"The Real Ghostbusters"	James L. Conway	Story by : Nancy Weiner; Teleplay by : Eric Kripke	November 12, 2009	3X5209	2.69
Following a text message from Chuck, Sam and Dean arrive at a hotel in Vermilion, Ohio, which is the site for a Supernatural fan convention. They find out that their over-enthusiastic fan Becky sent the message, and they have to deal with several Sam and Dean wannabes role-playing in a fictitious ghost hunt. After a convention attendee got attacked, the Winchester brothers find out that the hotel houses a real ghost named Leticia Gore, an orphanage caretaker who supposedly killed four children by scalping them. Together with two copycat Winchesters they find Leticia's bones and burn them, however they are later unable to leave the premises, and another attendee is killed. Sam and Dean have Chuck keep the attendees in the convention room while they deal with the three ghost boys who had killed Leticia's son. Afterwards, Becky reveals to Sam that Bela Talbot did not give the Colt to Lilith, but instead gave it to her subordinate, Crowley.
92	10	"Abandon All Hope..."	Phil Sgriccia	Ben Edlund	November 19, 2009	3X5210	2.51
Castiel finds Crowley (Mark A. Sheppard), and the brothers and Jo break into his mansion. To their surprise, Crowley shoots his henchmen and gives Sam and Dean the Colt on the condition that they use it to kill Lucifer, as he believes that eventually Lucifer will kill all of the demons after he destroys humanity. Sam, Dean, Ellen, Jo, and Castiel head to Carthage, Missouri, which appears deserted except Castiel sees it is full of reapers. When Castiel investigates, Lucifer captures and tries to persuade him to join his side. Meanwhile, Meg Masters confronts the Winchesters and the Harvelles, sending hellhounds to attack. Jo is mortally wounded, and they retreat into a hardware store. Dean confers with Bobby that the reapers are there to wait for their big boss, Death, one of the Four Horsemen. While Jo and Ellen sacrifice themselves to blow up the hellhounds, Dean and Sam confront Lucifer at the battle site where he has sacrificed the remaining townsfolk to his ritual to summon Death. Although Dean shoots Lucifer with the Colt, Lucifer recovers and heals, revealing himself as one of the five beings that the Colt cannot kill. Castiel tricks Meg into escaping Lucifer's trap and takes the brothers to Bobby as Death rises.
93	11	"Sam, Interrupted"	James L. Conway	Andrew Dabb & Daniel Loflin	January 21, 2010	3X5211	2.85
A former hunter named Martin, who has been admitted into a mental hospital in Ketchum, Oklahoma, calls Sam and Dean to help investigate a case. The brothers get themselves admitted as patients to check out the mysterious creature that has been attacking patients and has made their deaths look like suicides. They find out that they are dealing with a wraith, a creature that feeds on human brains and disguises itself as a human. The only way to identify a wraith is through a mirror, which reveals its true form. As the days go by, the Winchesters find themselves hallucinating. After an attempt to kill the hospital's chief of medicine, whom they suspect to be the monster, Sam is locked up and sedated with a heavy dose of tranquilizers. Despite his mind being paralyzed by the Wraith, Dean discovers that the wraith is the nurse who administered their tests in the beginning and kills it with a silver-plated letter opener right before she can suck Sam's brain dry. The two then flee the mental institution, and Sam admits that he has anger issues from everything that has happened.
94	12	"Swap Meat"	Robert Singer	Story by : Julie Siege & Rebecca Dessertine & Harvey Fedor; Teleplay by : Julie Siege	January 28, 2010	3X5212	2.71
Gary, a teenage nerd in Housatonic, Massachusetts, uses a body-switching spell to exchange bodies with Sam. Gary meets up with Dean, and the two start working on a case and kill a ghost together. Meanwhile, Sam is stuck in Gary's body and has to deal with his strict parents and high school. Gary's friends, Trevor and Nora, reveal they have made a pact with a demon who offered them everything they wanted in exchange for Sam and Dean. Trevor summons the demon, who possesses Nora and kills Trevor. The demon goes after Gary and tries to persuade him to meet Lucifer and "answer one little question" with yes, which would let the Devil into his true vessel. Gary and Dean fail to exorcise the demon together. Gary reverses the spell, and the boys take him home. Sam tells Gary that he should be glad to have a normal life and a family, but when he and Dean get into the car, he states that Gary's life "sucked ass." Dean counters by saying they may not know the good things they miss out on.
95	13	"The Song Remains the Same"	Steve Boyum	Sera Gamble & Nancy Weiner	February 4, 2010	3X5213	2.28
The fallen angel Anna travels back in time to 1978 to stop Mary and John Winchester from conceiving Sam. Without Sam as his vessel, Lucifer won't be able to bring about the end of the world. Castiel and the boys also travel to the past, where Dean reveals to Mary that he and Sam are her sons and that she has to leave John to prevent her sons from being born. She reveals that she is already pregnant. Anna and Uriel attack the Winchesters and kill Sam. Just as Anna is about to kill Mary, the Archangel Michael, having possessed John's body, burns Anna to death and banishes Uriel. He reveals that Cain and Abel are the brothers' ancestors and that their destiny as Michael and Lucifer's true vessels has been set since those ancient times. While he loves Lucifer, having practically raised him like Dean did Sam, he feels he has to kill his brother as he is a "good son" and that there is no such thing as free will, that everything is predestined. He resurrects Sam, erases Mary and John's memory, and returns the brothers to their time.
96	14	"My Bloody Valentine" (Note: Jensen Ackles starred in the 2009 film My Bloody Valentine 3D.)	Mike Rohl	Ben Edlund	February 11, 2010	3X5215	2.51
When couples start killing and eating each other, the brothers investigate and find angelic marks on the victims' hearts. Castiel asks Cupid about the strange incidents, but the angel of love says the killings are not his work. After examining another victim's body, Sam discovers a demon's briefcase containing a human soul. Soon, people start dying from binge eating or alcohol poisoning, which leads them to believe that one of the Four Horsemen, Famine, is behind the deaths. Castiel states that Famine harvests the souls of the people he killed and consumes them. Dean and Castiel set out to face Famine and cut off the finger on which he wears the ring containing his power. While Castiel is affected by Famine's power, Dean is immune due to being "empty inside". Having consumed demon blood, Sam uses his psychic abilities to exorcise the demons consumed by Famine, which destroys the Horseman. Sam is placed in Bobby's panic room to detox from the demon blood. Shaken by Sam's struggle, Dean desperately prays to God for help.
97	15	"Dead Men Don't Wear Plaid"	John F. Showalter	Jeremy Carver	March 25, 2010	3X5214	2.95
Sam and Dean investigate Bobby's hometown of Sioux Falls, South Dakota, where the dead are rising from the grave, but instead of attacking humans, they are happily reuniting with their families. The brothers turn to Bobby for help, but he tells them not to worry about it and to leave town. Suspicious, Dean investigates further and comes face to face with Bobby's dead wife Karen, who seems to have no memory of what has happened to her. Soon, the zombies start to become evil, killing and eating their loved ones. The brothers urge Bobby to kill Karen before she does the same. Bobby says he will take care of it as soon as she turns evil. Shortly after, his wife shows signs of becoming a flesh-eating zombie; before having Bobby kill her again, Karen reveals that she remembers her demonic possession and death. As Dean and Bobby prepare to fight the zombies, Bobby's salvage yard is swarmed with them, and they end up trapped. They are rescued by Sam and local sheriff Jody Mills, who found out the horrifying truth after her son killed her husband.
98	16	"Dark Side of the Moon"	Jeff Woolnough	Andrew Dabb & Daniel Loflin	April 1, 2010	3X5216	2.40
Ambushed by angry hunters, Sam and Dean are killed and sent to Heaven. Castiel explains that Zachariah is searching for them, and they must find the angel Joshua in the Garden at the end of the road through heaven. Zachariah finds the brothers and begins to torture Dean, saying that he is sick of being condemned by his fellow angels because he cannot handle "one little human." Joshua stops him and takes the Winchesters to the Garden. Joshua tells Dean that God will not help them, as He does not feel the Apocalypse is his problem. Joshua resurrects them with their memories intact. Castiel curses God and returns Dean his amulet, stating that it is useless now. Dean throws his amulet into the trash can as the brothers leave the motel, leaving Faith at the door.
99	17	"99 Problems"	Charles Beeson	Julie Siege	April 8, 2010	3X5217	2.78
Sam and Dean are cornered by demons, but saved at the last minute by Rob and his townspeople, who are aware of the Apocalypse and have been training to fight and kill demons. The brothers meet Pastor Gideon and his daughter Leah. Leah begins telling the locals that they are "Chosen" to win the Apocalypse, but to do so, they must eliminate "sinners" among them. The brothers learn that Leah has been replaced by the Whore of Babylon, a creature from Hell that emerges during the Apocalypse and tries to condemn as many people as possible to eternal punishment in Hell by tricking them into committing Deadly Sins. She can only be killed with a wooden stake from a tree in Babylon, wielded by a true servant of Heaven. They halt the Whore just before she and her "Chosen" can burn the "sinner" townspeople to death. The Pastor is knocked out and the Whore begins battling Dean, but he manages to stake her, proving that he is a true servant of Heaven.
100	18	"Point of No Return"	Phil Sgriccia	Jeremy Carver	April 15, 2010	3X5218	2.45
Before Dean can say yes to Michael, Sam and Castiel capture him and lock him in Bobby's panic room. At the same time, the angels resurrect their deceased half-brother Adam, supposedly to be Michael's new vessel. While Sam attempts to talk Adam out of it, Dean banishes Castiel and escapes; he is recaptured before the angels can find him, but Zachariah can get Adam. Sam releases Dean to help in the rescue mission, expressing faith in his brother, while Zachariah reveals Adam's resurrection was a trap for Dean. Castiel banishes four angels and himself to let the Winchesters reach Adam before Zachariah tortures Sam and Adam to get Dean to say yes, finally. Suddenly changing his mind, Dean demands that Michael kill Zachariah as his first condition before killing Zachariah himself with a hidden angel blade when the angel gets into his face. The three brothers flee as Michael descends, but Adam is trapped inside. When Dean enters the room moments later, the room holding Adam has disappeared. Dean apologizes to Sam for his decision.
101	19	"Hammer of the Gods"	Rick Bota	Story by : David Reed; Teleplay by : Andrew Dabb & Daniel Loflin	April 22, 2010	3X5219	2.82
Sam and Dean end up in Muncie, Indiana, at a hotel run by pagan gods from various cultures who want to use the boys as bargaining chips to stop the Apocalypse. The brothers make a deal: if the gods release the guests trapped in the hotel, the Winchesters will help the gods kill Lucifer. Dean leads the hostages outside and stumbles upon a very alive Gabriel, who tells Dean he can't kill Lucifer because he's his brother. Mercury summons Lucifer. He arrives and kills Mercury and all of the other gods except Kali. Gabriel shows up to help the brothers and sends them away. As he faces Lucifer for the first time in centuries, Gabriel tells him he's not loyal to him or Michael, but to humans, because they're always willing to forgive. As Gabriel makes his move, Lucifer kills him. Dean and Sam watch a movie Gabriel gave them, in which the archangel explains that they can't kill Lucifer, but they can trap him back in Hell. All they need are the four rings that belong to the Horsemen to do this. As Dean and Sam set out to find them, Pestilence is revealed to be on Earth spreading disease.
102	20	"The Devil You Know"	Robert Singer	Ben Edlund	April 29, 2010	3X5220	2.38
As the Winchesters search for Pestilence, they are approached by Crowley, who offers to help them find the Horseman through his demon handler Brady; though reluctant to trust the demon, they agree. While Dean is gone, Sam considers allowing Lucifer to possess him to force the Devil back into the Cage. Dean and Crowley can capture Brady who is supervising testing of the Croatoan virus; Brady is revealed to be possessing a friend of Sam's from Stanford and is the one who murdered his girlfriend Jessica Moore on Azazel's orders to force Sam back into hunting. Despite Brady's taunts, Sam restrains himself from taking revenge, and when the demon refuses to break, Crowley purposefully reveals their position to the demons; following a hellhound attack, held off by Crowley's hellhound, Brady gives up Pestilence's location. Sam kills Brady and gets his revenge for Jessica's murder while Crowley approaches Bobby Singer with a way to find Death that will require Bobby to sell his soul to the demon.
103	21	"Two Minutes to Midnight"	Phil Sgriccia	Sera Gamble	May 6, 2010	3X5221	2.53
Dean and Sam go after Pestilence and nearly die from a hailstorm of diseases. Castiel cuts off the Horseman's finger and takes the ring, but not before Pestilence tells them that "it's too late". Upon reuniting with Bobby, the brothers learn how Bobby sold his soul to Crowley in exchange for the location of the most powerful of the Four Horsemen, Death. Sam, Castiel, and Bobby (now able to walk again) head out to find and contain the Croatoan virus. The three contain the virus at the shipping warehouse and shoot those infected. Meanwhile, Dean goes with Crowley to find Death and get the last ring. Death and Dean meet in a Chicago pizza parlor, littered with the bodies of customers and staff. Death offers to give Dean his ring on the condition that he allow Sam to say yes to Lucifer so they can lure him into the trap. Dean agrees, receiving the ring and instructions on how to use all four of them to trap Lucifer. After Dean readies the rings to trap Lucifer, Bobby asks him what's he more afraid of: losing the world or losing Sam.
104	22	"Swan Song"	Steve Boyum	Story by : Eric Gewirtz; Teleplay by : Eric Kripke	May 13, 2010	3X5222	2.84
Sam and Dean confront Lucifer, and Sam offers himself as a vessel, hoping to overcome Lucifer's control. Lucifer is too strong, and Sam disappears into his body. Meanwhile, Dean learns from Chuck the time and location of the final battle between Michael and Lucifer. The following day at the battleground, Lucifer tries to talk Michael out of fighting, but he refuses. Castiel interrupts the fight by banishing Michael with holy fire. Lucifer kills Castiel and snaps Bobby's neck when he shoots him. He then starts brutally beating Dean, but stops when he notices an old army man of Sam's inside the Impala. Sam remembers his life growing up with Dean and manages to take control of his body. He uses the rings to reopen the door to the cage and prepares to jump inside. Michael tries to stop him, but he, too, is pulled into the pit while grappling with Sam. Castiel, resurrected as a more powerful angel, heals Dean and brings Bobby back to life. He returns to Heaven, hoping to bring order now that Michael is gone. Dean returns to Lisa and Ben, unaware that Sam is watching.

== Reception ==
The fifth season received critical acclaim, and is widely regarded as one of the show's best seasons. The review aggregator website Rotten Tomatoes reported a 100% approval rating for Supernatural's fifth season, with an average rating of 7.8/10 based on 9 reviews. The critics consensus reads, "Supernatural continues to benefit from its charismatic leads and a solid script, creating a story that is almost supernaturally addictive."

=== Controversy ===
The episode "Hammer of the Gods" was controversial among Indian and Hindu audiences, as it depicted Kali and Ganesh in a negative light.
