= No Rest for the Wicked (Supernatural) =

- Supernatural episode
- Dean Winchester is sent to Hell in the final moments of the episode. Series creator Eric Kripke described the scene as "M. C. Escher meets Hellraiser".
- Episode no.: Season 3 Episode 16
- Directed by: Kim Manners
- Written by: Eric Kripke
- Cinematography by: Serge Ladouceur
- Editing by: Anthony Pinker
- Production code: 3T6916
- Original air date: May 15, 2008

Guest appearances
- Jim Beaver as Bobby Singer; Sierra McCormick as Lilith/Zoey; George Coe as Pat Fremont; Jonathan Potts as Mr. Fremont; Anna Galvin as Mrs. Fremont

Episode chronology
← Previous "Time Is On My Side"	Next → "Lazarus Rising"
- Supernatural season 3

"No Rest for the Wicked" is the sixteenth and final episode of the third season of The CW television series Supernatural, and the show's sixtieth episode overall. Written by series creator Eric Kripke and directed by executive producer Kim Manners, the episode was first broadcast on May 15, 2008. The narrative follows the series' protagonists Sam (Jared Padalecki) and Dean Winchester (Jensen Ackles)—brothers who travel the continental United States hunting supernatural creatures—as they attempt to save the latter's soul from damnation. Having made a year-long demonic pact in the previous season finale, Dean has just one day left to live. The brothers must track down the demonic overlord Lilith, who holds Dean's contract. Lilith, meanwhile, is entertaining herself by possessing a young girl (Sierra McCormick) and terrorizing her family, a homage to the Twilight Zone episode "It's a Good Life".

This episode marks the final appearance of Katie Cassidy as the demon Ruby, because the role was recast as Genevieve Cortese/Padalecki would play Ruby going forward. The episode was originally intended to feature the return of Samantha Ferris as recurring character Ellen Harvelle. The writers initially intended that Sam would save Dean by giving in to his demonic abilities, but the 2007–2008 Writers Guild of America strike prevented the development of that storyline throughout the season. Dean is instead killed; the final scene of him in Hell was the "most complicated shot [the] visual effects department has ever done".

The episode received high ratings for the season, and garnered generally positive reviews from critics. The decision to follow through with Dean's Hell-bound contract was praised, as were the performances of Padalecki and Ackles. General consensus was that McCormick was "creepy" as Lilith, but lacked the menace of Fredric Lehne's Azazel of the second season.

== Background ==
Supernatural follows brothers Sam (Padalecki) and Dean Winchester (Ackles) as they travel the continental United States hunting supernatural creatures that pose a threat to society. At times, they are assisted by fellow "hunter" and family friend Bobby Singer (Jim Beaver). Their greatest enemies come in the form of demons, corrupted human souls that have escaped from Hell. A cloud of black smoke in their true form, they take possession of human hosts.

Twenty-two years earlier than the series' main storyline, the demonic tyrant Azazel fed his blood to Sam and other infants, to imbue them with demonic abilities. He gathers them together in the second-season finale "All Hell Breaks Loose" and coerces the young adults into a fight to the death to determine a leader for his demonic army. Sam is killed by the super-strong Jake Talley, but Dean sells his own soul to a crossroads demon in exchange for Sam's resurrection, a contract that leaves Dean with only a year to live. The Winchesters, Bobby, and fellow hunter Ellen Harvelle kill Jake and Azazel, but are too late to prevent the release of hundreds of demons from Hell.

One of the freed demons is Ruby (Cassidy), a former witch who claims to oppose the demonic world. She frequently helps the brothers throughout the third season with her demon-killing knife and knowledge of witchcraft, but Dean mistrusts her manipulative nature. As the deadline approaches, the Winchesters learn that Azazel's successor, Lilith, holds the contract to Dean's deal. He now only has one day remaining before he is sent to Hell.

== Plot ==
The episode begins with Dean Winchester (Ackles) being chased through a forest by a hellhound; as it mauls him, he awakens from his dream. His brother, Sam (Padalecki), tells him that Bobby has devised a way to locate Lilith, but unconvinced that it will succeed, Dean suggests he live up the rest of his time. Sam insists that he will be saved, but Dean feigns reassurance as he hallucinates a demonic-looking Sam.

Bobby tracks Lilith to New Harmony, Indiana. Dean does not want to attack unprepared, but he refuses to seek help from Ruby. Sam secretly summons her and asks for her knife, and Ruby tells him that his dormant psychic abilities could easily kill Lilith, whose guard is down as she is on "shore leave". Sam considers the alternative, but Dean shows up and tricks Ruby into a devil's trap—mystical symbols capable of rendering a demon powerless—and the brothers take her knife and leave. Despite Dean's objections, Bobby insists that he accompany them, and draws attention to Dean's hallucinations. With his demise rapidly approaching, Dean has begun "piercing the veil", allowing him to glimpse the demons' true forms.

When the trio arrive in New Harmony, they discover that Lilith is possessing a young girl (McCormick) and terrorizing her family. Pretending to be their daughter, Lilith kills the family pet when it is "mean" towards her and snaps the grandfather's neck after he seeks help from neighbors. As Bobby blesses a waterline running to the sprinklers of the family's home, Sam and Dean dispatch some of the demons who have taken over the neighborhood. Ruby appears and angrily confronts them, but is stopped short by an oncoming horde of demons. The three of them run into the house as Bobby activates the sprinklers, creating a barrier of holy water. While Dean takes the girl's father to safety in the basement, Sam and Ruby go upstairs and split up in search of Lilith. Sam finds the possessed girl in her bedroom, and although initially hesitant he prepares to strike until he is stopped by Dean, who reveals that Lilith has left her. As midnight approaches, they take the rest of the family into the basement.

Sam begs Ruby to teach him how to use his abilities, but she tells him that it is too late. Dean accepts his fate as the clock strikes midnight, but runs from the approaching hellhound. The three barricade themselves inside a room, but Dean quickly realizes that Lilith has taken over Ruby's host. Claiming to have sent Ruby "far, far away", Lilith telekinetically pins the brothers down and lets in the hellhound. As Dean is mauled to death, Lilith blasts Sam with white energy from her hand. Horrified to see that it has no effect, she flees her host before Sam can retaliate. A devastated Sam cradles Dean, whose soul is then shown in Hell hanging from a vast landscape of chains and meathooks while fruitlessly screaming for Sam to help.

== Production ==
=== Casting ===
"No Rest for the Wicked" marked the final appearance of Katie Cassidy as the demon Ruby. Dismissed for budgetary reasons, the actress was replaced by Genevieve Cortese for the fourth season. The writers intended Samantha Ferris to return as hunter Ellen Harvelle, a guest stint Ferris believed would have ended in her character's demise. She ultimately declined the offer because it "could cost [her] money and work". Following the mythological Lilith's role of "destroyer of children", the demon takes on a child host portrayed by Sierra McCormick. Series writer Sera Gamble commented that it was an "interesting" choice because it presented Lilith as "creepy and kind of molesty".

=== Writing ===
Originally entitled "No Quarter", the episode was written by series creator Eric Kripke. Much of the storyline served as a homage to the Twilight Zone episode "It's a Good Life", in which a powerful child terrorizes his town. Although Kripke found it difficult to write many of the episode's scenes, the terrorizing sequences "just came right out" because they were "just so fun".

We'd been saying we were going to do that all season long, so I feel like we had to go there. Anything less than that would have been a cop-out, because we'd been saying there was no way to break that contract.

— — Sera Gamble on the decision to kill Dean

The writers initially intended that Sam would save Dean from Hell, possibly even before "No Rest for the Wicked", by giving in to his demonic powers and becoming "this fully operational dark force" who would then want to go after Lilith. The battle would have been "much more climactic", with the Winchesters "going to war to save Dean's life". By the middle of the season, however, the writers realized the costs associated with depicting such an engagement and scaled it down. To make matters worse, the 2007–2008 Writers Guild of America strike prevented them from fleshing out Sam's evolving abilities throughout the season, and his entire story arc was pushed back into the fourth season. With Sam's storyline no longer dovetailing with Dean's, the writers "[never had] any doubt in [their] minds" to send Dean to Hell. Kripke disliked that the second-season finale "just ended", and he felt that this episode provided a cliffhanger ending that had people "biting their nails". Although the viewers' expectations that Dean would be saved was "reason enough", his imprisonment in Hell also served as a "turning point" for both the character and the series. Kripke commented, "You need huge moves to happen that can cause radical shifts in the characters, that set them off in a new direction. So what happens to Dean in Hell and how Dean gets out become primary concerns of season four."

=== Hell ===
The episode's final moments linger on Dean "meat-hooked in the center of what looks like a thousand mile spiderweb of rusty chains", a scene Kripke described as "M. C. Escher meets Hellraiser". The original vision for the final scene would have placed Dean in a "really nasty, bloody slaughterhouse, hanging from meat hooks". Here, Dean would start screaming as shadows fall over him. Discussions between Kripke, Manners, and Hayden led to the decision to present "one epic glimpse" of Hell, though they avoided aspects such as fire and brimstone to focus on more affordable visuals. Much debate went into the appearance of Hell because of its many variations. Though the scene matched with the many versions of "chains and people being ripped apart", art director John Marcynuk felt they should have made it "a little more mysterious and dark". He commented, "My opinion is, the vaguer the better, because you let the imagination take over. People have different fears, and Hell's such a personal torment." In series writer Sera Gamble's opinion, Dean's location is more of the "waiting room"—the place "they stick you before they hand you the sign-in sheet"—a far cry from what he will experience "once he gets into the first chamber of Hell".

The sequence was miserable for Ackles, who spent four hours in make-up having the various hooks and other prosthetics applied. Wired cuffs around his wrists and ankles, as well as a harness around his waist, were used to lift him 13 feet into the air in front of a green screen. To his discomfort, the harness slipped, causing its buckle to continuously dig into his hip throughout the scene's three or four takes. The actor, who "had tears rolling down [his] face" as he was lowered down, deemed it the most physical pain he has endured for a single shot.

The visual effects department also found it quite a challenge, often referring to the ten-day process as the "Hell Shot". Initially planned as 12–13 seconds, the shot ended up running 35 seconds, a huge feat to render on high-definition film. They were also required to digitally remove the wires attached to Ackles, and add in chains. Lightning strikes occur throughout the scene, based on practical lightning effects done during the shoot to meet Manners' and cinematographer Serge Ladouceur's demands. This "[slaved the department] into the frequency of the lightning", forcing them to "reverse-engineer the randomness". Because of the vast complications and expenses in presenting Hell to such an extent, future representations are restricted to "very tight angles".

=== Filming ===
Principal photography took place in Vancouver, British Columbia. The neighborhood scenes were shot in a cul-de-sac of million-dollar homes, and production housed the residents in hotels for two nights to allow for filming. Although the sequence of Sam and Dean looking across the street as the grandfather is killed appears to be shot from inside one of the houses, the actors were actually standing on a two-story scaffolding across the street, looking through fake windows. Shots of them inside the house in the same scene made use of one of the basements.

=== Music ===
The episode's synthesized orchestral score was written by Jay Gruska, who especially enjoyed working on the episode due to his friendship with an actor from "It's a Good Life". The music, however, was not influenced by The Twilight Zone, as Gruska prefers to base his scores on an episode's visuals. The terrorizing scenes thus featured child sounds such as the high register of a toy piano, which used a "low approach underneath it" to make it "absolutely sinister".

In addition to the score, the episode followed the series tradition of a rock soundtrack. On their drive to New Harmony, Sam and Dean sing along to Bon Jovi's "Wanted Dead or Alive". To mask Ackles' "very impressive singing voice", Kripke asked the actor to sing off-key.

== Reception ==
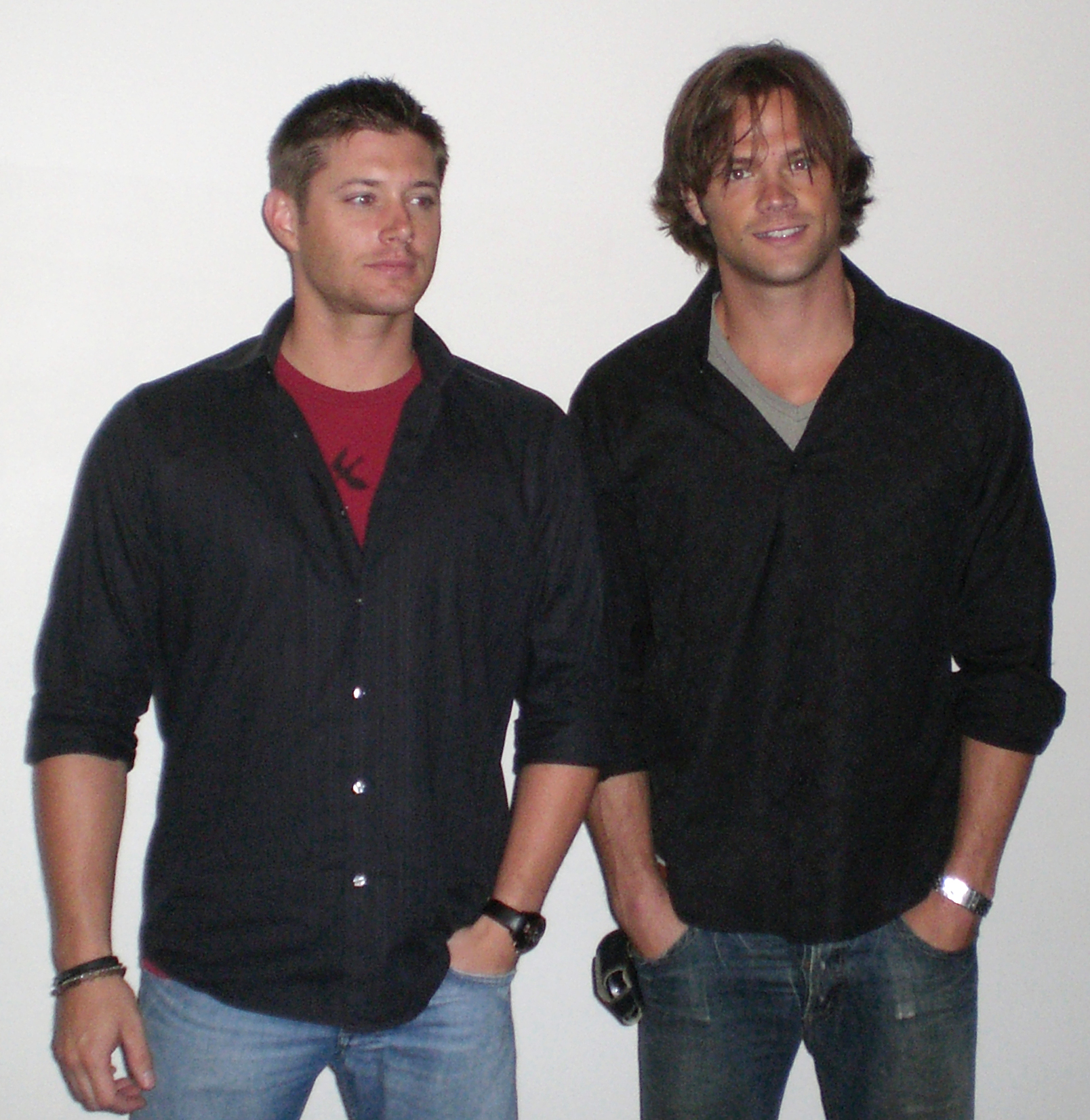
Critics praised Ackles (left) and Padalecki (right) for their performances as Dean and Sam Winchester.

On its initial broadcast, the episode was watched by 2.998 million viewers. It received generally positive reviews from critics, with TV Guide ranking the episode No. 95 in its 2009 list of "TV's Top 100 Episodes of All Time". BuddyTV's Don Williams deemed the finale "absolutely fantastic", and ranked it tenth on his list of the top Supernatural episodes of the first three seasons. Although he "respected the show for having the guts to follow through with [Dean's] deal"—the ending was a "complete jaw-dropper"—he pointed out the previous times the Winchesters have died and were subsequently resurrected. Memorable moments for Williams include Sam and Dean singing "Wanted Dead or Alive", and Dean admitting that his love for Sam is his main weakness. Likewise, TV Guide's Tina Charles described the episode as "creepy and suspenseful and funny and sad and just plain awesome", and felt it came close to outdoing the first-season finale "Devil's Trap". Especially praised were the actors' performances. Padalecki "totally stepped up to the plate and knocked one out of the park", and Ackles was "nine kinds of awesome". On the latter, Charles noted, "From acting out Dean's stubborn ways, his inappropriate humor, those crushing looks of despair and doom and Dean's death, the man can play it all." McCormick was described as "creepy", leading to Charles' "huge compliment" of comparing the episode to The Twilight Zone. For the critic, the "totally unexpected" Bon Jovi sing-along "totally rocked" and has "instantly become a classic". Her main disappointment with the episode, however, was the lack of Sam "going dark side". Maureen Ryan of the Chicago Tribune listed the episode as one of the "gems" of the third season, and believed it likely to end up as one of her "Favorite 'Supernatural' Episodes of All Time". The San Diego Union-Tribune's Karla Peterson agreed, giving the episode a grade of A−. Although it "got off to a shaky start with some weirdly paced scenes", it ended up a "finale that wrapped us in sticky threads of old fears, mind-bending new business and one awesome Bon Jovi song".

Brett Love of TV Squad, on the other hand, "[stopped] short of calling [it] an excellent finale". While the deal's payoff was "fantastic"—he was surprised by Dean's death, and looked forward to its implications for the fourth season—Love was slightly disappointed with Lilith. McCormick "impressed" him as Lilith, but he did not find her as "menacing and scary" as Fredric Lehne's Azazel. The villain's storyline of terrorizing a family would have made a "great regular episode", but was not epic enough for a finale. Diana Steenbergen of IGN felt the scenes of Lilith's shore leave briefly "[dragged] the episode down" because the viewers "understood the situation quickly enough". She otherwise liked the episode, and gave it a score of 8.9 out of 10. Steenbergen enjoyed the "first-rate brotherly scenes", and was happy that the series followed through with its promise of sending Dean to Hell, commenting that the related hellhound attack was "one of the scariest things the show has done yet". Like Charles, she applauded the acting, noting that "we feel [Dean's] fear as the deadline approaches". She went on to write that Padalecki's "best moments are in the barely contained rage at his inability to save his brother, and in his grief at losing Dean", while "Lilith and her little girl mannerisms in Ruby's body were far more chilling, and interesting, than Ruby's tough chick persona ever has been".
