= Sympathy for the Devil (Supernatural) =

- Supernatural episode
- Episode no.: Season 5 Episode 1
- Directed by: Robert Singer
- Written by: Eric Kripke
- Cinematography by: Serge Ladouceur
- Editing by: Anthony Pinker
- Production code: 3X5201
- Original air date: September 10, 2009
- Running time: 42 minutes

Guest appearances
- Jim Beaver as Bobby Singer; Kurt Fuller as Zachariah; Rob Benedict as Chuck Shurley; Mark Pellegrino as Lucifer/Nick; Bellamy Young as Sarah; Rachel Miner as Meg Masters; Emily Perkins as Becky Rosen

Episode chronology
← Previous "Lucifer Rising"	Next → "Good God, Y'All!"
- Supernatural season 5

"Sympathy for the Devil" is the first episode of the fifth season of paranormal drama television series Supernatural and the 83rd overall. The episode was written by showrunner and series creator Eric Kripke and directed by executive producer Robert Singer. It was first broadcast on September 10, 2009 on The CW. In the episode, Sam and Dean watch the aftermath of Lucifer being freed from the Cage while the angels plan a new strategy to stop the Apocalypse.

== Plot ==
Following the release of Lucifer from his Cage, Sam and Dean Winchester are mysteriously transported onto a plane flying overhead. Sam is also clean of the influence of demon blood. Confused by the turn of events, the Winchesters visit Chuck the Prophet who tells them that Castiel was killed by the archangel who had shown up to stop him. At that moment, Zachariah arrives with two angels to force the Winchesters' compliance with Heaven's plans, but Dean uses a blood sigil he saw Castiel use in the 'Green Room' to banish the three angels. Sam later creates hex bags to hide them from the senses of both angels and demons.

As the Winchesters work on finding a way to stop Lucifer, Chuck sends them a message about a vision he received on the location of the Michael Sword, the weapon the archangel Michael used to defeat Lucifer the first time. With the help of Bobby Singer, the Winchesters figure out the weapon is in their father's lock-up, but Bobby is revealed to be possessed by a demon loyal to Meg, the Winchesters old demon enemy. After being ordered to kill Dean, Bobby manages to stab himself and kill the demon possessing him instead, allowing the Winchesters to kill Meg's other demon minions with Meg herself fleeing. After taking Bobby to the hospital, the Winchesters rush to the lock-up to find the Michael Sword.

At the lock-up, the Winchesters are confronted by Zachariah and his angels who reveal the whole thing was a trap for the Winchesters. Dean is the Michael Sword: his one true vessel on Earth to combat Lucifer with. When Dean refuses to give Michael permission to possess him, since it is required, Zachariah begins horrifically torturing the brothers to force Dean's cooperation. Unexpectedly, Castiel appears and kills Zachariah's two angels. Castiel implies that the same being that rescued the Winchesters from the convent resurrected him and forces Zachariah to heal the brothers and leave. Castiel brands the Winchesters with sigils that will protect them from angelic detection and warns them that Lucifer is close to gaining a vessel. Before leaving, Castiel confirms that he was dead, but refuses to tell them how he came back to life.

At the same time, Lucifer visits a man named Nick who recently lost his wife and child. After tormenting him with hallucinations, Lucifer visits Nick in the form of his dead wife and convinces him to allow Lucifer to possess him.

After the encounter with Zachariah, the Winchesters visit Bobby who has survived his wounds but is left paralyzed from the waist down. Dean gives a rallying speech about fighting both the forces of Heaven and Hell to stop the Apocalypse but privately admits to Sam it was only for Bobby's benefit. Sam choosing Ruby over Dean has also damaged Dean's trust in his brother and he doesn't know how to get over it.

== Reception ==
=== Viewers ===
The episode was watched by 3.40 million viewers. This was a 17% increase in viewership from the fourth season finale, watched by 2.89 million viewers but a 15% decrease from the previous season premiere, with 3.96 million viewers.

=== Critical reviews ===
Professional ratings
Review scores
Source	Rating
IGN	9.0
The A.V. Club	B+

"Sympathy for the Devil" received universal acclaim. Diana Steenbergen of IGN gave the episode an "amazing" 9.0 out of 10 and wrote, "It is not just the words however, it is the way they are delivered perfectly by each character that makes the script work as well as it does. Supernatural is blessed with great comic timing and deadpan delivery from both Jensen Ackles and Jared Padalecki, but the real scene stealer in that department is Rob Benedict as Chuck Shurley. I love how after picking a bloody molar out of his hair he feels the need to share that he is having a 'really stressful day.' His chagrin at being forced to reach out to one of his fans is classic, and I appreciate the fact that the show is continuing what they started last season with their own special way of acknowledging and lovingly poking fun at their own fans through the fans of Chuck. That girl's reaction to meeting the real Sam and Dean is hilarious."

The A.V. Club's Zack Handlen gave the episode a "B+" grade and wrote, "One of the best parts about last season was that it got complex enough that it wasn't easy anymore to tell white shirts from black. I'm sure Satan will turn out to be a monster, and that Sam and Dean will have to take him down, and it will be awesome. But when Nick says 'Yes,' I felt satisfied, and not just because I want to see Lucifer's next move. Like I said before, the title of the episode was actually a little smarter than I initially thought; because here is a devil it's not that hard to agree with."

Jon Lachonis of TV Overmind, wrote, "Snappy writing, great twists, awesome dialogue. Supernatural continues to be one of the best shows on television. As far as premieres go, this was one of the most fluid setups for a season long arc that I have ever seen, mostly because the body of the episode played as a really good story instead of becoming subtext to the 'grand plan.' Each returning character was given classy and effective treatment I almost jumped out of my seat when Castiel returned and the newest character, Becky, is a terrific gateway character for we obsessed fans, and I hope we see more of her. Score one for Supernatural. Exhilarating, exciting, intense, and hypnotically engrossing – this is how television is done people."
