= Jo Harvelle =

Fictional character in the TV series Supernatural

- Supernatural character
- Alona Tal as Jo Harvelle
- First appearance: "Everybody Loves a Clown" (2006)
- Last appearance: "Defending Your Life" (2011)
- Created by: Eric Kripke; John Shiban
- Portrayed by: Alona Tal

In-universe information
- Gender: Female
- Occupation: Hunter; Bartender
- Family: Ellen Harvelle (mother); William Anthony Harvelle (father)
- Nationality: American

Joanna Beth Harvelle is a fictional character on The CW Television Network's drama/horror television series Supernatural portrayed by Alona Tal. Aspiring to be a hunter of supernatural creatures like her parents, she was introduced in the second season in order to explore a mother-daughter relationship in the hunting world. She was ultimately removed from the series by the end of the second season—Kripke admitted the conception of the character was flawed from the beginning—but returned in the fifth and seventh seasons.

== Plot ==
Jo first meets Sam and Dean Winchester in the second season episode "Everybody Loves a Clown". The brothers look for her mother Ellen at Harvelle's Roadhouse—a saloon frequented by hunters of supernatural creatures—after she leaves a voice mail message on the phone of their deceased father, John Winchester. Throughout the second season, Jo appears to have romantic feelings for Dean, but Dean does not have feelings for her, it seems to him that she is like a sister to him. Wanting to be a hunter like her late father, Bill, to feel connected to him, Jo slips away from the Roadhouse against her mother's wishes to help the brothers on a hunt in "No Exit", but they ultimately have to rescue her from a vengeful spirit. An angry Ellen reveals to her that John's recklessness caused Bill's death, which strains Jo's friendship with Sam and Dean. Jo soon leaves the Roadhouse to live the life of a hunter. When the demon that once possessed Meg Masters possesses Sam in "Born Under a Bad Sign", it finds and captures Jo, planning to threaten her life to force Dean to kill his brother. While holding Jo hostage, the demon plays cruel mind games with her by first telling her that Dean doesn't return her feelings for him and then by telling her that John actually killed Bill to "put him out of his misery" after he incurred fatal wounds, despite Bill's pleas to see his wife and daughter one more time. Dean rescues Jo without harming Sam, but when Jo attempts to join him in capturing the demon, he refuses to allow her to come; he tells Jo he will call her, but as he leaves, she mutters, "No, you won't."

In the fifth season episode "Good God, Y'All!", Jo reappears with her mother Ellen in a small Colorado town called River Pass. They plan to help Rufus, a demon hunter and one of Bobby's friends, kill the demons that have laid siege to the town. However, Jo and Ellen are separated in the chaos. Jo later finds and joins up with Rufus and other townspeople. Eventually, they attack Sam and Ellen, both of them appearing to be possessed by demons. Jo joins in with Rufus to torture the supposed "demon" out of a captured Sam with holy water and salt, but becomes doubtful when no demonic effects are present on Sam. Dean and Ellen arrive and, after a brief struggle, convince Jo and Rufus that War, one of the Four Horsemen of the Apocalypse, is responsible for making all the townspeople turn against each other by thinking that both sides are demons. Jo and Ellen team up with the Winchesters again in "Abandon All Hope...", where they help the brothers reacquire the Colt — a mystical gun rumored to be capable of killing anything — in order to kill Lucifer. Upon tracking his location to an abandoned town, they are confronted by Meg, accompanied by a pack of hellhounds. The group of hunters flee, but Jo is injured when saving Dean from the hellhounds. Knowing that her wounds are fatal and that Lucifer must be stopped, Jo convinces the others to build a bomb and to use her as bait for a trap. Ellen stays behind and opens the front doors while the Winchesters escape onto the roof. After Jo dies in her arms, Ellen blows up the building, killing the hellhounds and herself in the process.

Jo is mentioned but not seen in the sixth season episode "My Heart Will Go On", in which she is temporarily restored to life as a result of the angel Balthazar saving the Titanic from its destined sinking. She makes an on-screen return in the seventh season episode "Defending Your Life" as a ghostly witness called by the Egyptian god Osiris when he is judging Dean's guilt. Jo's ghost instead testifies that Dean was not responsible for her fate. Osiris declares him guilty anyway and forces her to try to kill Dean, but she is able to take her leave in peace when Sam kills Osiris and thereby frees her from the god's control. Supernatural executive producer Robert Singer confirmed that the apparition was Jo's ghost and not an illusion created by Osiris.

== Characterization ==
Series creator Eric Kripke initially described Jo as an "innocent girl who wanted to be a hunter" and who tends to look before she leaps; she is also "enthusiastic" and very "girl-next-door" in her approach to hunting the supernatural. He later regretted writing Jo in this way, as he felt that it was the wrong characterization for a female character on Supernatural. However, Jo grows throughout the second season as she rebels against her mother by running away to be a hunter, which Kripke believed made her harder and tougher. Regarding her character's capture by a vengeful spirit in "No Exit", actress Alona Tal felt that Jo was a "badass" who handled the situation well. Tal commented, "She fought and risked her life and stayed there as bait. It took a lot of guts."

The actress noted that Jo matures during her hiatus between the second and fifth season. Having found out the hard way that "banter doesn't always work", she becomes quieter and "not as mouthy". The character "called the shots" in her final appearance, and was the "bigger person" by forcing everyone to accept the reality of the situation. After years of hunting together, the relationship between Jo and Ellen also develops; Tal came to view them more as equals rather than daughter and mother. Although Jo's feelings for Dean remain the same, Tal liked the fact that she does not easily give in to Dean's advances in "Abandon All Hope...". She believed that Jo resists her urge to "go crazy [with him]" due to the dire circumstances, which "gave it a little more meaning". When asked about the kiss that Dean gives to Jo when she is dying, Tal explained that she interpreted the kiss as Dean "really seeing [Jo] and thanking [her] and appreciating [her]. For him, at that particular moment, there was no other way to express it but with a kiss."

With the character now a spirit in her seventh season appearance, Tal felt that Jo's death brought her "clarity" and "a different level of comfortability". Noting that the afterlife is a "completely different world", the actress described Jo as "just relaxed and not angry". She confirmed that Jo doesn't hold Dean accountable for her death, pointing out that Jo had chosen to become a hunter because of her father, not because of Dean. However, series writer and co-executive producer Adam Glass felt that Dean still has "some real guilt" over Jo's death because the character feels that he "could have pushed [her] away from this life, not pulled [her] more into it."

== Development ==
Due to the father-son dynamics of the hunting world depicted in the series' first season with the Winchesters, the writers decided to explore a mother-daughter relationship. This resulted in the introduction of the character Jo Harvelle and her mother Ellen, though the Alex character was eventually renamed Jo. Tal had been a fan of the show, and decided to audition for the role. Since the character was not fully explored during her first few appearances on the show, Tal did not know what her personality would be. Because of the way Jo is introduced—threatening Dean with a rifle—Tal was under the impression that the character was an experienced hunter. With this in mind, she decided to portray her as "somewhat confident and cool" by making use of her experience in the Israeli army, where she served for two years. Tal commented, "When I was in the army I was holding my gun and feeling all dangerous and badass. It's an attitude, it's a different kind of walk, and the way you hold yourself, the way you look at things. I tried to put that in there because she didn't say much."

The work you do up there is unlike on any other show. And it was a lot of fun, but it's not over. You never know what might happen [on Supernatural], and you have to stay open-minded. I got what I wanted for Jo, which was respect.

— Tal discussing her work on the series following her character's death.

Kripke felt that she came across as more of a "girl-next-door" than the dangerous type of character Dean would be attracted to, like Sydney Bristow of Alias. Tal also noted the tension between Jo and Dean. Kripke admits that, even before Jo's debut, he had doubts about the way the character was conceived. Because of these factors, the character was eventually phased out of the second season altogether.

During the 2009 San Diego Comic-Con, Kripke announced that Jo would return in the series' fifth season. The opportunity to return surprised Tal due to the character's negative fan reaction and the large time span since her previous appearance. She was later alerted about Jo's demise in "Abandon All Hope..." by director Phil Sgriccia. Though unhappy, Tal was "all for it" because she felt it benefited the show, and found it "grand" that Jo "went out in a blaze of glory". Jo was one of many deceased characters the writers considered to have appear in the alternate reality of the sixth season episode "My Heart Will Go On", but they ultimately settled on Ellen. Although executive producer Robert Singer stated that Jo would not be appearing in the sixth season, he noted that it was possible she could return in the next season.

Tal's return for the seventh season was announced at the 2011 Comic-Con. On the choice to bring Jo back for "Defending Your Life", writer and co-executive producer Adam Glass explained, "Knowing the history there, knowing the emotion that Dean would feel for her, we knew it'd be great. Jo's a favorite, too, so we wanted to see her back on the show." Tal was happy to return to the show, saying, "I didn't care that it took me over a season to come back. Just to be back at all was a blessing." Feeling that she herself had grown as a person since her appearance in the fifth season, Tal tried to mirror that in her performance. She noted, however, "Obviously, [Jo] died. So there’s been some issues." Singer called her work in the episode "terrific."

On the possibility of another return to the series in the future, Tal said, "Whenever it works out and they do want me back, I’m always game, and I’m always excited to go back there. It’s a fun place to go back to."

== Reception ==
Critical reception to Jo has been generally positive. Diana Steenbergen of IGN favored Jo from the beginning, deeming her "tough and direct, and also female, something the boys don't have a lot of in their lives right now". reappearance in the fifth season. However, Steenbergen was confused by Jo's anger at Sam and Dean over John Winchester's involvement in her father's death, feeling that the show's producers may have added it to the story as an excuse for Jo's removal from the series. While Tina Charles of TV Guide was at first unsure about the character, she wrote that by the episode "No Exit," "Tal did step things up and kinda won me over." She believed that while Jo did not make a good lascivious interest for Dean, she was good in a "sisterly or friendly fellow-ghostbuster way," deeming her as "someone they can count on in a pinch." Overall, Charles felt that Jo "fit into that world, whether she was a little overzealous or not."

On the other hand, Sean Elliott of IFMagazine disliked the "Scrappy-Doo qualities of the character". He compared Jo to Dawn Summers of Buffy the Vampire Slayer, feeling that she "is always trying to help and always gets in the way." Fan reaction to the character was generally negative as well. Ackles summed up the response as, "No, no, we just want this to be about the boys." Though Kripke believed that Tal was a "terrific actress" who "did valiantly and beautifully with the part [they] gave her," he felt that introducing her as a lascivious interest was a mistake and came to believe that women should only be introduced into the series as antagonists. The failure with Jo prompted the series writers to introduce Ruby the following season in an attempt to "course-correct".
