= The Ranch (film) =

2004 film by Susan Seidelman

- Genre: Comedy; Drama
- Written by: Lisa Melamed
- Directed by: Susan Seidelman
- Starring: Jennifer Aspen; Jessica Collins; Samantha Ferris; Nicki Micheaux
- Music by: Nathan Larson
- Country of origin: United States
- Original language: English

Production
- Executive producers: Gary Barber; Roger Birnbaum; Stuart Birnbaum; Lisa Melamed
- Producers: Ginger Sledge; Scott Cooper
- Cinematography: John Thomas
- Editor: Keiko Deguchi
- Running time: 90 minutes
- Production company: Spyglass Entertainment

Original release
- Network: Showtime
- Release: July 5, 2004

The Ranch is a 2004 American made-for-television comedy-drama film directed by Susan Seidelman starring Jennifer Aspen, Jessica Collins, Samantha Ferris and Nicki Micheaux. The film premiered on Showtime on July 5, 2004.

== Plot ==
The film takes place at a professional bordello in Reno Nevada, where prostitution is somewhat legal, focusing on the sex workers employed there and the clients that frequent it.

== Cast ==
- Jennifer Aspen as Shayna
- Jessica Collins as Kim
- Samantha Ferris as Taylor
- Nicki Micheaux as Velvet
- Paige Moss as Rickie Lee
- Ty Olsson as Other David
- Bonnie Root as Emily
- Carly Pope as Beth Ann
- Amy Madigan as Mary Larkin
- Giacomo Baessato as Ray
- Lucia Walters as Lavender Rose
- Cailin Stadmyk as Chicklet
- Dana McLoughlin as Janey
- Veronika Habal as Cat
- Paula Shaw as Yetta
