= Ruby (Supernatural) =

Fictional character in Supernatural

- Supernatural character
- Katie Cassidy (left) and Genevieve Cortese/Padalecki (right), both as Ruby
- First appearance: "The Magnificent Seven" (2007)
- Last appearance: "Destiny's Child" (2020)
- Created by: Eric Kripke
- Portrayed by: Katie Cassidy (season 3); Genevieve Cortese/Padalecki (seasons 4 and 15)

In-universe information
- Species: Black-eyed Demon
- Gender: Female
- Significant other: Sam Winchester
- Abilities: Demonic possession Expert martial artist Invulnerability; Occult knowledge Superhuman strength Telekinesis; Teleportation; Witchcraft

Ruby (aliases name as "Reis") is a demon on The CW's Supernatural, portrayed mainly by actresses Katie Cassidy and Genevieve Cortese. Created by the writers to expand on the characterization of demons within the series, she first appears in the third season, wherein she assists series protagonists Sam and Dean Winchester in fighting her fellow demons. By the fourth season, she has won Sam's trust and begins training him to kill demons with his psychic powers, though Dean remains fearful of ulterior motives. The character is killed at the end of the fourth season. In the fifteenth season, Ruby returns through flashbacks and a visit to the Empty, the angels' and demons' afterlife.

Though the fans at first reacted negatively towards Cortese replacing Cassidy after the third season, Cortese and creator Eric Kripke felt that they became more accepting as the fourth season progressed. While fan response to the character was mixed overall, critical reception was generally negative. A common criticism was underwhelming performances by Cassidy and Cortese.

== Plot ==
Debuting in the third season premiere "The Magnificent Seven", Ruby (Katie Cassidy) trails Sam Winchester—a hunter of supernatural creatures—and eventually rescues him from a group of demons, whom she kills with her unique demon-killing knife. She reveals her identity to Sam in "The Kids Are Alright", but claims to be different from other demons and wants to help Sam fight them. In return for his cooperation, she promises to save his brother Dean from the Faustian deal he had made to resurrect Sam in the second season finale "All Hell Breaks Loose: Part 2". However, she refuses to tell Sam her motives. Though he distrusts her and Dean wants to kill her before she can harm them, Sam decides to let her continue to help him with both saving Dean and fighting the hundreds of other demons who—like Ruby—escaped Hell in the second-season finale.

Ruby's credibility builds throughout Season 3. In "Sin City", she restores power to the Colt for the Winchesters to use in their war against demons. The episode "Malleus Maleficarum" provides her backstory, revealing that she had been a witch during the Plague who sold her soul to a demon. She confides in Dean that, unlike other demons, she still remembers what it is like to be human, citing this trait as the reason she is helping the brothers against other demons. She returns in "Jus in Bello" to save the brothers from an attacking horde of demons. Upon learning that they have lost the Colt, she decides to perform a spell that will destroy all the demons in the area, including herself. However, because the spell requires a human virgin's heart, Dean does not allow her to perform it. Although the plan he comes up with instead saves himself and his brother, the people they leave behind get killed by demons pursuing Sam and Dean, which Ruby uses to rebuke the brothers for not listening to her.

Contrary to her promise to Sam, Ruby tells Dean that she cannot actually save him from Hell and that she had lied to Sam to get him to listen to her. However, in the season finale "No Rest for the Wicked", she tells Sam that she had lied to Dean and that she truly can help Sam save him. Her plan is to train Sam to harness his latent demonic abilities so that he can use them to kill Lilith, the demon who holds the contract for Dean's soul. Believing that Ruby is trying to manipulate Sam into giving in to his dark side, Dean tricks her into a devil's trap—a mystical symbol capable of rendering demons powerless—and leaves with Sam to face Lilith. Ruby frees herself and tracks the brothers down during their campaign, but gets expelled from her host body by Lilith and thus is not present at the confrontation between Lilith and the brothers, with her whereabouts at the time unclear. The fourth season episode "I Know What You Did Last Summer" states that she had been sent back to Hell. Eventually, Ruby returns and offers Sam her help in taking revenge on Lilith for Dean's death in "No Rest for the Wicked" as well as in stopping Lilith's apocalyptic plans. To appease Sam, who dislikes her using a living host against the host's will, Ruby takes possession of a body recently declared to be dead (Genevieve Cortese). They have sex together at least once, and she brings him out of his downward spiral towards self-destruction. Consequently, Sam now trusts Ruby implicitly.

Ruby begins training Sam in using his demonic abilities to exorcise (and later, kill) demons, and continues to do so in secret following Dean's resurrection by the angel Castiel in the fourth season premiere. The episode "On the Head of a Pin" reveals that she is feeding Sam her demonic blood to boost his powers, and by "The Rapture", he has become addicted to drinking her blood. In the following episode "When the Levee Breaks", Sam and Dean have a heated confrontation over Sam's trust in her and the negative influence she has on him, leading to a vicious fight which ends in Sam strangling Dean and Dean severing ties with Sam. In the season finale "Lucifer Rising", Ruby insists that she and Sam must murder a demonically possessed woman despite the woman being alive and pleading for them to let her go, as Ruby argues that Sam needs to also drink the woman's blood in order to be able to kill Lilith; Sam eventually agrees. In the episode's climax, Ruby keeps Dean from interfering while Sam succeeds in killing Lilith. Afterward, Ruby reveals that she is a double-agent working for Lilith who has just tricked Sam into setting the demons' revered god Lucifer free with Lilith's death. With Sam's help, she is killed by Dean with her own knife.

In season 15's "Destiny's Child," the Winchesters learn from the angel Anael that she and Ruby occasionally worked together when they had common interests and Anael gave Ruby the Occultum, supposedly to sell it for a lot of money. Anael claims that Ruby hid it in Hell and was killed before she could sell it off, but this proves to be a trap as Anael hires demons to kill Sam and Dean. Needing the Occultum to continue with their plan to kill God, Castiel has Jack send him into the Empty so he can ask Ruby herself where to find it. The Shadow, the being that rules the realm, reluctantly allows Castiel to talk to Ruby who takes on the form she had when she died. Ruby reveals that, in reality, Anael approached her with the suggestion that they hide in the Occultum until the Apocalypse was over. Ruby never told the angel where she hid the Occultum, but offers Castiel the location in exchange for his help in getting out of the Empty since that would effectively resurrect Ruby. Sympathetic with Ruby due to his own time in the realm, Castiel agrees to at least try, which the demon accepts. Ruby whispers the Occultum's location in Castiel's ear before disappearing. However, Ruby fails to mention the hellhounds she left to guard the Occultum, causing Dean to think Ruby was trying to kill them like Anael did before they decipher Ruby's clues and locate the artifact.

== Characterization ==
Prior to Ruby's introduction in the third season, series creator Eric Kripke summarized the character as "ruthless and a little crazy and rough around the edges", calling her "[a] little unhinged" because she lacks the "moral conscience" that Sam and Dean have. Katie Cassidy, the actress who portrayed Ruby in the third season, described her as a "kick-ass, bad-ass" ally of Sam and Dean's who "also likes to stir up a little trouble." According to Cassidy, Ruby is "mysterious", "manipulative", and in control of her situation, being "always 10 steps ahead of everybody else". On this, Cassidy proclaimed that Ruby "knows what she wants, and she's out to get it". Actress Genevieve Cortese, who played the character in the fourth season, deemed Cassidy's incarnation "very tough" and "hard to get close to".

In taking over the role, Cortese felt "conflicted over where Ruby is now versus where she's come from" and explained that her own portrayal of the character was a "total 180 from [how she was] last season", being calmer and "more fear-driven"; after a discussion with Kripke on the character's mindset, Cortese saw Ruby as being in a "lonely, desperate" situation. She tried to make Ruby seem "as innocent as possible" to make viewers question her true allegiance, and to "bring more of a humanity" to Ruby than Cassidy had. For example, taking from the third-season finale in which Dean is sent to Hell, Cortese portrayed the character as having some guilt over his death, even though Ruby was not responsible for it. The actress also acknowledged that Ruby was likely manipulating Sam when she claimed to remember how it felt to be human, but suggested that there was also an element of truth to her character's words.

Cortese believed that Ruby fell in love with Sam over the course of the season, though she questioned whether this was "true love" or her being "in love with what he can do". As Cortese noted, "He has something she can nurture. It's almost like a mother bear and her cub [in terms of] how protective she is... Sam's all [Ruby has], so it's almost like giving birth, in a weird, messed-up way." She stated that the sex scene between her character and Sam was "about two people who are so broken and sad" and compared it to similar sex scenes from the film Monster's Ball. Although Ruby eventually reveals herself as a traitor, Kripke wrote her final scene with the intention of depicting Ruby as "the opposite of evil" and to show that Ruby does care about Sam, despite her manipulation of him to free Lucifer; Kripke explained that, in Ruby's mind, she had to lead Sam down that path because "it was for his own good".

== Development ==
Ruby was described as a "Reis" in press releases prior to her debut so that her true demonic nature would surprise the audience. The writers created Ruby to change the perception of demons into more of a grey area, rather than the prevalent belief of "black and white", "They're evil, we're good" approach previously used in the series. However, the writers also planned for Ruby to impact the brothers negatively by facilitating the story arc of Sam falling into evil—which had been set up in the second season, but without follow-through—and causing a fracture in their relationship. Knowing this, the writers were amused by fans questioning why they were "trying to make [Ruby] likable". Despite Ruby's overall betrayal of the brothers, writer Sera Gamble commented, "[Ruby] brought the idea that you can't just dismiss demons as things that need to be killed right away. They could be useful, and while fundamentally untrustworthy, there might be cause to trust them in a given situation."

Fearing that introducing the character as an "[accessory] to the boys" would hinder their chances of successfully integrating her into the series, the writers intended that Ruby should be "a character in [her] own right" and deemed her an antagonist "with [her] own interests and [her] own motives" rather than a love interest to Sam or Dean, which they felt had been their mistake in their introduction of the widely disliked Jo Harvelle in the second season. While they were not planning on a romance between Ruby and either of the Winchesters in the third season, however, they were open to the possibility in the future, with Kripke saying, "If the chemistry is there, and we see the sparks, and we want it to happen, and the fans want it to happen, it'll happen." Due to "protective and occasionally nervous" fans, Kripke meant to introduce Ruby in "small doses". Wanting fans to know the show would always be about Sam and Dean, and nothing else, he stated, "[Ruby and Bela are] there for important plot elements, but it's not the Ruby and Bela show, nor is it about the four of them cruising around in the Impala together. It's about the guys."

Cassidy originally auditioned for the role of Bela Talbot, but ultimately received the part of Ruby. As opposed to using traditional demonic abilities such as telekinesis, Ruby instead relies on conventional martial arts and her demon-killing knife. Cassidy trained in kickboxing alongside Bela's actress Lauren Cohan to be able to perform Ruby's martial arts skills, prompting her to attempt as many of the fight scenes as she could rather than rely on her stunt double. Before filming for the third season began, she and Cohan decided to watch previous seasons together to catch up on the show. Cassidy also prepared by looking to Sharon Stone's performance in the film Basic Instinct for inspiration due to Ruby's manipulative ways. As Cassidy explained, "[Stone's character] always has the power, and there's this mystery about her." Costume designer Diane Widas had Ruby dressed in dark colors so that she would blend into shadows, also giving her pleather jackets and narrow jeans to allow Cassidy to be more active. Because of Cassidy's height difference with the lead actors—she is 5'7" while Sam's actor, Jared Padalecki, is 6'4"—she had to wear tall, spiky high heels that at times made her lose balance.

Rather than introduce some entirely new body for Ruby that'll get confusing for the audience and confusing for Sam, why not keep going back to a performance that we're loving?

— Kripke on the decision to keep Cortese.

Kripke cited budgetary reasons for Cassidy's departure after the third season. According to Cassidy, however, Warner Bros.'s uncertainty about what direction to take Ruby in prompted her to leave when the opportunity to star in the series Harper's Island arose. To "make the best out of a bad situation", Kripke and the writers planned for Ruby to take on a new host every few episodes for the fourth season. They believed this would "keep [viewers] guessing", and provide a "cool character that most shows don't have the ability to do". Auditions for an unnamed "love interest" were held to recast Ruby with a new actress, and Cortese was hired for the part. She was then informed that she would actually be playing Ruby. Before the first episode she was in aired, however, she was said to be playing "a small-town waitress" named Kristy who had become "romantically involved" with Sam after Dean's death. Cortese played the first of what was expected to be many incarnations of Ruby, but an impressed Kripke ultimately chose to keep her in the role because she "brought a lot of the different colors and vulnerabilities to Ruby that [he] was really looking for". Although Cortese viewed DVDs of Cassidy's portrayal, she tried to make the character her own at the producers' request rather than emulate Cassidy. She was not as concerned with how Ruby was received by the audience—stating "if people don't like her, they don't like her"—as much as she was with using her performance to "answer questions" about Ruby and her relationship with the Winchester brothers, such as why Sam and Dean were continuing to work with Ruby in the fourth season.

== Reception ==
BuddyTV staff columnist Don Williams felt the addition of Ruby was a "cheap ploy" to attract teen male viewers, that the character distracted viewers from the "brotherly bond that made the show so special in the first place," and that Cassidy "was cast more for her looks than her acting prowess." However, he later admitted Ruby "remains one of the more interesting and ambiguous evildoers on the series." Although IGN's Diana Steenbergen had looked forward to Ruby's introduction, she ultimately found the third-season incarnation a "wasted" character who did little to improve the series. Her main concerns consisted of Ruby's "unlikable and manipulative" qualities and her tendency to make the Winchesters "look stupid." Cassidy "never quite [pulled off]" the "tough chick" persona of Buffy the Vampire Slayer's Faith or Battlestar Galactica's Six. TV Guide's Tina Charles, however, liked Ruby's action-packed introduction in "The Magnificent Seven." She was "intrigued" by the character in "The Kids Are Alright," and felt Cassidy was "doing a good job." Ruby made a "plausible addition" to "Malleus Maleficarum," with Charles finding it "cool" to learn Ruby's backstory due to its implications for Dean's storyline. Karla Peterson of The San Diego Union-Tribune thought Cassidy "wasn't awful" in "The Magnificent Seven." Though "not great enough for Ackles to really play off of" in "Malleus Maleficarum," the actress was "good enough to make her weaker acting chops kind of work for her." While under the impression that Ruby had been killed off in "No Rest for the Wicked," Peterson wrote that the character "got gone just as [she was] getting interesting" and deemed her a "decent traveling [companion]."

In her debut, Cortese impressed Peterson "even less than the old Ruby." While Peterson was accepting of the sexual relationship between Ruby and Sam, she felt the "seduction came out of nowhere" in "I Know What You Did Last Summer." Contributing to this problem was Cortese's inability to "pull it off," making the "whole thing [feel] gratuitous and clumsy." Conversely, Peterson enjoyed the performances of actresses Anna Williams and Michelle Hewitt-Williams as Ruby's temporary hosts in the episode; the former was "great," while she found the latter "sassy" and "[missed] her already." She "loved" Ruby's death in the finale, describing it as "a beautiful thing." Similar to Peterson, BuddyTV's Williams considered Cortese's acting "a bit distracting," but noted she improved over time. Steenbergen considered Cortese an "acceptable Ruby," but wrote that the actress' portrayal was often "too girlish to connect with the previous incarnations of the character." In contrast to Williams, Steenbergen felt that Cortese "seemed out of her depth in the acting department" towards the end of the season. Ruby's seeming betrayal of Anna Milton in "Heaven and Hell" would "have added some welcome layers to her character" in Steenbergen's opinion, but the character's true intentions made the character development "less exciting." However, Steenbergen deemed Ruby's overall deceit of Sam a "great revelation."

Like BuddyTV's Don Williams, fans were very wary at first of bringing in female characters to the male-dominated show. To make matters worse, Kripke wrote a lackluster scene intended solely for the audition process. Fans quickly came across it on casting sites, and developed the feeling that the character "really [looks like she sucks]." However, Kripke believed that fans would change their minds about Ruby after learning that she was a demon. By the middle of the third season, Kripke felt enough fans were "responding positively to vindicate the character," and that most were "finally embracing her" by the third-season finale, with Cassidy's version of Ruby even being dubbed a "fan favorite" later on. When the character returns in the fourth season, she is very different from her third season counterpart. Cortese felt that while the drastic change made fans angry, the flashbacks provided in "I Know What You Did Last Summer" shed some light on Ruby's new mindset and made fans more accepting of the character. However, the overall criticisms towards Cortese's performance made her reluctant to return for an episode in the sixth season, although she eventually accepted when she learned she would be portraying herself.

Despite the generally negative reception to Cortese in the role, fans voted her version of Ruby the 32nd sexiest female character in fantasy and science fiction film and television in a 2012 poll by SFX for the Top 200 Sexiest Characters In Sci-Fi, making her the highest-placing female Supernatural character in the list, beating out Jo Harvelle at number 53 and Ellen Harvelle at number 77.
