= Ellen Harvelle =

Fictional character in the TV series Supernatural

- Supernatural character
- Samantha Ferris as Ellen Harvelle
- First appearance: "Everybody Loves a Clown" (2006)
- Last appearance: "My Heart Will Go On" (2011)
- Created by: Eric Kripke; John Shiban
- Portrayed by: Samantha Ferris

In-universe information
- Occupation: Proprietor; Hunter
- Spouse: William Anthony Harvelle (husband)
- Children: Jo Harvelle (daughter)

Ellen Harvelle is a fictional character on The CW Television Network's Supernatural, portrayed by Samantha Ferris. Introduced in the second season in order to explore a mother-daughter relationship in the hunting world, the "gun-toting, beer-slinging" Ellen brought a "maternal energy" to the male-dominated series. The mother of Jo Harvelle and the proprietor of Harvelle's Roadhouse—a bar frequented by hunters of supernatural creatures—Ellen provides advice and assistance to Sam and Dean Winchester throughout the second season. Although the character's appearances in the third season were dropped due to the 2007–2008 Writers Guild of America strike and failed negotiations, she returns in the fifth and sixth seasons. Critical reception to the character has been positive, with many critics happy to see her return.

== Plot ==
An old friend of John Winchester, Ellen Harvelle is the wife of hunter William Anthony Harvelle and the mother of Jo Harvelle. She runs Harvelle's Roadhouse, a saloon and pub frequented by hunters of supernatural creatures. When Sam and Dean Winchester arrive there in the second-season episode "Everybody Loves a Clown", a wary Ellen holds them at gunpoint until she learns that they are John's sons. She gives them information regarding a dangerous hunter named Gordon Walker in "Bloodlust", while Sam and Dean later explain to her in "Simon Said" about the demon Azazel's planned war against humanity. Her relationship with the brothers is strained in the episode "No Exit", where she reveals that she believes her husband's death was the result of a mistake made by John Winchester while they were working together on a hunt. However, she admits to Sam in "Hunted" that her husband's death was not John's fault and that she had forgiven him a long time ago. She also does not blame the brothers for Jo's decision to go off hunting by herself.

The Roadhouse is destroyed by demons in "All Hell Breaks Loose, Part One", and her whereabouts are unknown throughout the episode. It is revealed in "Part Two" that she had left the Roadhouse to run a few errands. She, the Winchesters, and fellow hunter Bobby Singer track Azazel's activities to a cemetery surrounded by a giant devil's trap made of railroad tracks. Unable to step inside the giant symbol without becoming trapped and powerless, Azazel forces the human Jake Talley to do his bidding. The hunters are unable to stop Jake from opening a gateway to Hell in a mausoleum there, and the devil's trap is broken as hundreds of demons are released into the world. As the brothers then kill Azazel, Ellen and Bobby close the gateway.

In the fifth-season episode "Good God, Y'All!", Ellen reappears with Jo to help fellow hunter Rufus kill demons that have laid siege to a small town. By the time the Winchesters arrive, it appears that Jo, Rufus, and some other townspeople have become demonically possessed. However, Ellen and Dean eventually realize that War, one of the Four Horsemen of the Apocalypse, is making the townspeople see each other as demons. Sam and Dean break War's spell just as Ellen is about to be killed by one of the town's residents. In "Abandon All Hope...", Ellen and Jo once again team up with the brothers to find Lucifer and kill him. Upon their arrival in a seemingly abandoned small town, however, they are attacked by the demon Meg and a pack of hellhounds. Jo is severely mauled, forcing them to barricade themselves inside a hardware store. Knowing that her wounds are fatal and that Lucifer must be stopped, Jo convinces them to build a bomb and to use her as bait for a trap. Ellen stays behind and opens the front doors while the Winchesters escape onto the roof. After Jo dies in her arms, Ellen blows up the building, killing the hellhounds and herself in the process.

The angel Balthazar changes history in the sixth-season episode "My Heart Will Go On" so that the Titanic never sank, Ellen is restored to life, and is married to Bobby. However, the original timeline is eventually restored.

== Characterization ==
Everyone always loved her because they thought she was this kick-ass broad, but to see Ellen go out with pride, dignity, and emotion was necessary.

— Ferris on her character's emotional side.

Series creator Eric Kripke felt that Ellen brought a "maternal energy" to the series, and described the character as "a lioness, which is tough and badass and 'You touch my children, I will kill you.'" Likewise, actress Samantha Ferris described her as a "gun-toting, beer-slinging, bar-owning broad" with a "very maternal core". Ferris also feels that, despite Ellen having gone through a lot in her life, she is cautious rather than jaded, and is "very protective of the things she has in her life", especially her daughter Jo and the Winchesters. Thus, her main concern is Jo's safety, which prompts her to forbid her daughter from going on hunts. When she realizes that she can no longer stop Jo from doing what she wants, Ellen becomes her hunting partner, deciding it is the best way to look after her. By the time of Ellen's final appearance, actress Alona Tal came to view their characters more as equals rather than mother and daughter.

== Development ==
Due to the father-son dynamics of the hunting world depicted in the series' first season with the Winchesters, the writers decided to explore a mother-daughter relationship, resulting in the introduction of Ellen and her daughter Jo. The name originated from the writers' decision to base her on the "tough yet emotionally-vulnerable" characters portrayed by actress Ellen Barkin. Ellen was meant to have a "true and honest platonic friendship" with John Winchester, and her backstory of her husband having been killed due to John's mistake was added to the storyline to explain why John never mentioned the Roadhouse to his sons. Ferris auditioned for the role, and feels that she was exactly what they had been looking for. She commented, "I have a certain kind of personality that works specifically with a role, and Ellen is just me on television. They were looking for a tough, strong, yet a little maternal actor, and I struck a chord." Series creator Eric Kripke agrees, feeling that Ferris "really brought the character to life," being "nuanced and complex and tough, yet beautiful and feminine."

The writers intended for the character to make only two guest appearances in the third season, which left Ferris "a bit surprised and [disappointed]" at Ellen's lack of involvement. However, her initial return was scrapped due to the 2007–2008 Writers Guild of America strike, and the actress declined a guest appearance in the finale because the lackluster offer "could cost [her] money and work." The opportunity to return for the fifth season surprised her due to the large time span since her previous appearance. Though she expected her character to eventually die, a devastated Ferris was surprised at how quickly it occurred. However, after speaking to director Phil Sgriccia—he told her that Ellen was the "perfect fodder" for the "kick" that the series needed, and would "go out in a blaze of glory"—the actress came to realize that the character's death made sense. Ellen's last words to Dean—"Kick it in the ass."—was an improvised homage to the late Supernatural executive producer and director Kim Manners, who had died the year before and would often recite the phrase before filming a scene.

Wanting to "have a surprise in [the new reality]" of the sixth-season episode "My Heart Will Go On," the writers considered bringing back various deceased characters. Executive Producer Robert Singer explained that they ultimately decided upon Ellen because "she's a fan favorite" and "in a perfect world, she probably would be a good mate for Bobby."

== Reception ==
Critical reception to Ellen has been positive. In their initial appearance, Bryan Enk of UGO felt that the new hunters of the Roadhouse had potential to be the Supernatural equivalent of Buffy the Vampire Slayers's Scooby Gang, comparing Ellen to Buffy's Giles, as she is "the elder who can help guide the boys from a home base and serve as an emotional link to their father, a parental figure without all the melodramatic baggage of the actual father from the first season." Maureen Ryan of Chicago Tribune was "annoyed" at the destruction of the Roadhouse in the second season finale, as she "really loved Ellen." Diana Steenbergen of IGN also favored Ellen from the beginning, believing her to be "a great addition to the show." She deemed Ellen "tough and direct, and also female, something the boys don't have a lot of in their lives right now."

Steenbergen was happy to see the character return in the fifth season, noting that the show has been missing "smart, tough women who are not evil in general." Tina Charles of TV Guide also welcomed the character back, and enjoyed how Ellen's initial reaction to Dean Winchester in "Good God, Y'all!"—hugging and then slapping him—was "very much in character." Regarding the character's death, Charles noted that "when [Ellen] went down in 'Abandon All Hope[...]' like [she] did, I felt it. [Her death] meant something." Though also happy to see Ellen reappear in the fifth season, Ryan was disappointed at the lack of screentime the character received in "Good God, Y'All!" Commenting on the character's farewells in the fifth season, Ryan noted that Ferris "brought [her] A-game to 'Abandon All Hope…'" She added that "[Ferris fits] perfectly into the 'Supernatural' world because [she understands] that on this show, restraint is everything. It's not necessarily just about what the characters say or do, it's about what they don't say—what they can't find the words for."

Having missed Ellen's "maternal influence," Charles was happy to see her return in the sixth-season episode "My Heart Will Go On," while Ryan called Ellen's scenes with Bobby in the episode "probably the strongest part of the show." Ellen's reappearance gladdened Steenbergen, who called the character a "force to be reckoned with on the show" and added that "she is still missed."

In a poll conducted by SFX for the Top 200 Sexiest Characters In Sci-Fi, Ellen was voted the 77th sexiest female character in fantasy and science fiction film and television.
