= Sam Winchester =

- Supernatural character
- First appearance: "Pilot" (2005)
- Last appearance: "Carry On" (2020)
- Created by: Eric Kripke
- Portrayed by: Jared Padalecki; Colin Ford (teenager); Alex Ferris (child); Dylan Kingwell (child); Colton James (body switch)
- Voiced by: Yūya Uchida (Anime, Japanese dub of live action series); Jared Padalecki (English dub of anime)

In-universe information
- Alias: Keith (S5 EP3)
- Nicknames: Sammy, Bitch (by Dean); Moose ( by Crowley)
- Species: Human (special child); Ghost (formerly); Rabid (cured)
- Gender: Male
- Occupation: Hunter; Former undergraduate and law school applicant; Witch-in-training (taught by Rowena)
- Family: Dean Winchester (older brother); John Winchester (father); Mary Winchester (née Campbell) (mother); Dean Winchester II (son); Adam Milligan (younger paternal half-brother); Deanna Campbell (maternal grandmother); Samuel Campbell (maternal grandfather); Henry Winchester (paternal grandfather); Millie Winchester (paternal grandmother)
- Significant others: Jessica Moore; Ruby

Samuel "Sam" Winchester is a fictional character and one of the two protagonists of the American drama television series Supernatural along with his older brother, Dean. He is portrayed primarily by Jared Padalecki. Other versions of the character have been portrayed by Alex Ferris and Dylan Kingwell (child), Colin Ford (teenager), and Colton James (body switch with Gary Frankle in Season 5).

== Development ==
Sam Winchester was created by Eric Kripke, creator and original showrunner of Supernatural, when he pitched a show to the WB about two brothers who investigate the supernatural. Sam's name is a homage to Sal Paradise in Jack Kerouac's road-trip novel On the Road, tying into Kripke's concept for an Americana road-trip television series. It was intended for the brothers' last name to be "Harrison" as a nod to actor Harrison Ford; however, there was a Sam Harrison living in Kansas, so the name had to be changed for legal reasons. Combining his interest in the Winchester Mystery House and his desire to give the series the feel of "a modern-day Western", Kripke settled on the surname of "Winchester". Sam and his brother Dean are from Lawrence, Kansas, due to its closeness to Stull Cemetery, a location famous for its urban legends. Jared Padalecki, who portrays Sam Winchester, was almost turned down for the role because he portrayed a blue-collar character with no aspirations of college for his role as Dean Forester on Gilmore Girls, but won his chance to audition after his manager pointed out that the actor was a National Merit Scholar, where his chemistry with Jensen Ackles earned him the role.

== Background ==
Colin Ford portrays the young Sam Winchester.

Sam was born on May 2, 1983, to John and Mary Winchester in Lawrence, Kansas. He is one of two focal characters in the series, along with his older brother, Dean, who is four years his senior. He is named after his maternal grandfather, Samuel Campbell, and comes from a line of expert hunters on his mother's side of the family and men of letters on his father's side, respectively.

Sam's childhood is explored in the form of flashbacks (as well as present-day dialogue) in episodes throughout the series.

When Sam was six months old, his mother Mary (a retired creature hunter) was engulfed in a massive conflagration by yellow-eyed demon Azazel (one of four Princes of Hell). Her death was not premeditated, but rather a result of her incidental interruption of Azazel's visit to Sam's crib in the night – a contractual option Azazel had acquired with Mary's "consent" years before Sam was born, and which Azazel was now exercising in order to feed Sam his own demon blood to bestow him with psychic powers. Sam was saved from the ensuing house fire by his father, who then gave him to then-four-year-old Dean to carry outside, but Mary tragically died. Since that event, Dean has felt responsible for Sam and became Sam's de facto protector, largely due to their father's absence when he was away tracking Azazel.

Sam and Dean spent their childhood moving from town to town every few weeks while their father hunted supernatural beings, seeking to exact revenge on their mother's killer. Consequently, they lived frugal childhoods and struggled to form long-term connections with others. Sam believed that his mother had died in a car accident and that his father was a traveling salesman, until the age of 8 (1991), when he read John's meticulous hand-written journal entries, describing intricate details of his hunts (as well as creature-related literature and obsessive cataloguing of demonic omens related to Azazel), compelling Dean to confirm the existence of the paranormal. Soon after, Sam seriously considered fleeing his life, as a runaway, with his imaginary friend, Sully (1991), but ultimately rejected the opportunity to escape and expelled Sully from his life. Sam started hunting alongside his brother and father at the age of 8–12, assuming increased responsibilities around the time that Dean left temporary foster care at Sonny's (1995); however, he began wanting a normal life without monsters again. A couple of years later (1997), a teacher, Mr. Wyatt, took interest in Sam, encouraging him to carve out a life away from the "family business" upon reading his writing assignment: a precocious story about a werewolf hunt, which Wyatt interpreted as an allegory and an in-depth character study about family dynamics. Throughout the rest of his teens, he continued to provide support to John and Dean, including in an advisory capacity for a kitsune hunt (1998) which he stumbled into personally in direct connection to meeting teenaged Amy Pond. At nineteen, after a heated argument with John, Sam matriculated into Stanford University, thus finally splintering from his family and their hunting crusade, until the main story events unfolded in Season 1, pulling him back into a role of saving people.

== Storylines ==
=== Season 1 ===
At the start of the series, 22-year-old Sam is a senior at Stanford, in the process of applying for law school. Sam also has a girlfriend, Jessica, with whom he lives and secretly plans to marry. One night, however, his brother Dean solicits his assistance after their father John goes missing. Sam eventually accompanies his brother. After defeating a woman in white and discovering a trail to lead them to their father, Sam returns to Stanford where he witnesses Jessica's death at the hands of a demon – exactly the same way his mother was killed. This incites him to go with Dean to find their father and to kill the demon in order to avenge the deaths of his mother and his lover. In the consequent episodes, the brothers deal with dangerous mythical creatures and urban legends such as the wendigo, Bloody Mary, and shapeshifters. During this time, Sam begins experiencing episodes of precognitive dreams and once displays telekinesis.

As the search for John continues, Sam argues with Dean constantly – mostly about the way Dean obeys his father's orders without question, while Sam questions them and resents his father's treatment of them as "loyal little soldiers". The brothers eventually split up, with Dean going to investigate a mystery his father has assigned him while Sam decides to search for their father elsewhere. The two are eventually reunited after Dean apologizes.

Later in the season, John is captured by demons, and the brothers manage to rescue him. However, they soon learn that the demon who killed their mother is in possession of their father's body. Though John begs Sam to kill him, Sam instead shoots John in the leg using the Colt, and the demon escapes. As Sam drives his father and a badly wounded Dean to a hospital, a truck driven by a demon-possessed man crashes into them, totaling Dean's Impala and gravely injuring the Winchesters.

=== Season 2 ===
At the beginning of the second season, the Winchesters are at the Nashville hospital, with Sam and John escaping with minor injuries, while Dean is on the brink of death. In a deal with Azazel, John sacrifices his soul and the Colt in exchange for Dean's life. While the boys mourn their father's death, Sam expresses much guilt about never having a chance to reconcile with John, leading him to believe that his father died thinking his own son hated him.

As the boys start to take a more active role in hunting, Sam begins to search for psychic children like him to find out Azazel's plan. Eventually Sam learns from Dean that, before their father's death, John told Dean that Azazel is planning to turn Sam evil, and that Dean must either save him or kill him. Although angered at his father and brother upon learning this revelation, Sam decides to save as many people as possible so that he can change his destiny. In the season finale, Sam is transported to an abandoned town along with Azazel's other chosen children. There he learns Azazel's plans: he and the other children must kill one another until there is one survivor – who will lead a demon army (as the Antichrist). Sam also discovers that Jessica was killed because her death would lead Sam back into hunting and Mary interrupted Azazel during the process of feeding Sam demon blood, and thus was killed. It is also revealed that Mary somehow knew Azazel. Although Sam tries to protect the other children, various fights ensue, and the children are killed off one by one. Eventually, only Jake Talley and Sam are left, at which point Sam is stabbed by Jake. Sam dies in Dean's arms.

In the aftermath, a desperate and lost Dean trades his soul to the Crossroads Demon for Sam's resurrection. With the help of fellow hunters Bobby Singer and Ellen Harvelle, Sam and Dean track down Jake, but are unable to stop him from opening a gateway to Hell on Azazel's orders. However, Sam subdues Jake and kills him in cold blood. Eventually Bobby and Ellen manage to close the gateway while Sam and Dean battle Azazel. With the help of John's spirit, Dean finally kills Azazel and John shares an emotional moment with his sons before finally moving on. Afterwards, Sam learns that he was dead and Dean sold his soul to bring him back. He then promises Dean that he will save him no matter what it takes.

=== Season 3 ===
Sam continues to do whatever he can to save Dean from going to Hell; he begins to become more ruthless and is willing to kill anything demonic even if his prey is part human (i.e., demonically-possessed humans), human witches, and even Gordon Walker, who became a vampire. Sam later reveals that he is trying to become more like Dean so that, if he fails to save Dean's soul, he is ready to face a world full of demons on his own.

Season three also sees the introduction of the demon Ruby, who tries to gain Sam's trust by helping the brothers in fixing The Colt, saving them numerous times, and telling Sam she can save Dean from Hell, even though in reality she cannot. Ruby also reveals that because Sam refuses to lead the demon army, another demon named Lilith has filled the power vacuum and is leading the army while carrying intentions to kill Sam; she is also revealed to hold Dean's contract for his soul.

In the season finale, Sam and Dean, armed with Ruby's demon-killing knife, confront Lilith in a last-ditch effort to save Dean's soul. Sam is incapacitated by Lilith and forced to watch as his brother is killed by a hellhound. Lilith then tries to kill Sam; however, her powers have no effect on him and she flees, leaving a crying Sam with Dean's mutilated corpse.

=== Season 4 ===
Four months after the season three finale, Dean wakes up in his own grave and claws his way out. He and Bobby meet up with Sam at a motel, where an overwhelmed Sam joyously reunites with Dean. While trying to figure out how Dean returned from Hell, Dean and Bobby confront the being who revived him, Castiel, an angel who was ordered by the Archangel Michael to raise Dean from the fires of hell and resurrect Dean. They discover that this happened because the angels need Dean and Sam's help to stop Lilith, who is breaking the 66 Seals of God. Once the Seals are all broken, Lucifer, the first fallen angel and chief adversary in the war of angels and demons, will be freed from Hell, bringing the Apocalypse upon the Earth. It is also revealed that Lucifer spawned all of the demons starting with Lilith who is now active. Castiel develops a friendship with Dean and helps him understand the upcoming events. Castiel also reveals the Winchesters' past and shows Dean the connection between the now deceased Demon Azazel and his family. He reveals that Dean's mom was a hunter and working cases around the time Azazel was making crossroad deals in 1973. She and her hunter family, the Campbells, tracked the yellow eyed Demon down and eventually the Demon was stopped, but not before the Demon possessed and killed Mary's father and mother and killed her then boyfriend John Winchester. Shockingly, Azazel makes a deal with Mary to bring back John in exchange for certain debts owed 10 years later. When Mary protests over the cost being her soul, Azazel says that he does not need her soul – just a favor years later. Dean is shocked that Mary's deal resulted in he and his brother's permanent lives as hunters.

It is revealed that in the months without Dean, Sam – depressed, drinking heavily, and carrying a death wish – tries to bargain with various Crossroads Demons in order to exchange his soul for Dean's. None of them accept the offer. Realizing he cannot save Dean, Sam plans to kill Lilith in revenge. He makes contact with Ruby – now in a different host – who teaches him how to use his powers to exorcise demons. In time, he and Ruby become lovers and he appears to be moving on from Dean's death – to an extent, at least. When Dean finds out about Sam's powers and all the secrets Sam has been keeping from him, Sam responds by saying that he does this because Dean looks and treats him like a freak. Sam then promises Dean that he will not use his powers anymore but breaks the promise when it becomes apparent that his powers may be needed to prevent the Apocalypse.

During Jump the Shark, Sam and Dean learn of the existence of their half-brother Adam Milligan with Sam using the teachings of his father on Adam after he is attacked by monsters. They also learn that their father had an affair with Adam's mother resulting in him being born on September 24, 1990, and kept it secret so Adam could have a normal life, unlike the boys. At the end, it is revealed that it was a ghoul (that wanted revenge on John for a previous hunt) and impersonating Adam who was killed but Dean saved Sam and the brothers burned Adam's body.

Sam's powers become an important part of the fourth season as they are shown to fluctuate – at times so weak that he can barely exorcise a demon, whereas at other times they are strong enough to kill a demon. It is revealed that drinking demon blood makes Sam's powers grow stronger while at the same time making him "cold" and "arrogant". Sam eventually becomes addicted to demon blood, a fact that Dean soon discovers. With Bobby's help they lock Sam in a protected panic room so that he can detox, but the withdrawal symptoms are painful and he begins experiencing hallucinations. Just as the process becomes easier for Sam, Castiel appears and frees Sam. He meets up with Ruby and learns that he will need to drink more demon blood than he has ever done in order to have the strength to kill Lilith. Dean finds and confronts them and tries to kill Ruby, but Sam intervenes. He and Dean argue about how to stop the Apocalypse, whereupon Dean tells Sam he's changing into a monster, leading to a vicious fight between the brothers. Sam is the victor and as he leaves, Dean tells him not to return – just as their father John, years ago, told Sam not to return when he left for college.

As Sam begins to feel the guilt over abandoning his brother, he and Ruby capture a demon that knows Lilith's location. Using his powers to torture the demon, she gives the location, but as Sam is about to drink her blood, the demon gives control to her human host, inciting immense guilt in Sam. A message from Dean, altered by the manipulative, arrogant angel Zachariah, manipulates Sam, pushing him to continue his original mission to kill Lilith; he then drains the woman of her blood anyway. Ruby and Sam go to St. Mary's Convent in Ilchester, Maryland, where they find Lilith. As Sam attempts to kill Lilith, Ruby holds the doors shut to keep Dean, who has just arrived, from interfering. Sam hesitates when he hears his brother yelling for him, but when Lilith mocks him for his inability to do the job – even after becoming a monster to do so – he finishes her off, fulfilling his true destiny as the "special child". Lilith's death breaks the final seal and begins forming a portal for Lucifer. At this point, Ruby reveals that she was leading Sam along the entire time so he would break the seal. Dean finally enters the room and kills Ruby with her own knife, while Sam holds her in place. Sam apologizes to his brother as a white light shows a portal beginning to open.

=== Season 5 ===
As the portal for Lucifer opens, Sam and Dean are teleported onto an airplane by an unknown force (God). Sam loses his demon powers, claiming that the force that transported him and Dean onto the plane cleaned him up. He feels tremendous guilt for starting Armageddon and soon learns his acts have revealed a destiny Dean will be the vessel of the Archangel Michael to fight Lucifer. He is later told by Dean that he does not think he can trust Sam anymore due to Sam choosing a demon over his own brother. Over time, Sam realizes that he is too dangerous to be involved in hunting, and he and Dean go their separate ways. During this time, Sam tries to start living a normal life, but is approached by Lucifer in his dreams in the form of Jessica, who tells him that Sam is his true vessel in conjunction with Dean being the true vessel for Michael. Sam decides to start hunting again with Dean as he is tired of demons controlling his life and seeks redemption for starting the Judgment Day; although Dean refuses at first, after he is sent to a nightmarish future in which he sees how awful things got with him and Sam not being together, he decides to join up with Sam once more.

On their search to find a way to defeat Lucifer, the brothers attempt to use the Colt and look for God, but it is revealed that the Colt cannot kill Lucifer and God does not care about the Apocalypse. These actions make Dean decide to become Michael's vessel even if the end result is the deaths of millions of people, however, Sam's faith in Dean pulls him back into finding another solution. Upon the death of the Archangel Gabriel, the brothers discover that by using the rings from the Four Horsemen of the Apocalypse, they can reopen and trap Lucifer back into Hell. As Dean and Sam already have War and Famine's rings, they search for Pestilence and Death's location, leading Sam to meet his old college friend Brady: the guy who introduced Sam to Jessica and the demon ordered by Azazel to kill Jessica. Although tempted to kill Brady immediately, Sam realizes that Brady is needed to find Pestilence's location and with the help of the demon Crowley they discover the horseman's location – after which Dean allows Sam to kill Brady.

After Castiel captures Pestilence's ring and Death hands his ring to Dean, both Bobby and Dean reluctantly decide to go with Sam's plan – that is, for Sam to agree to being Lucifer's vessel, then jump into the cage trapping them both in Hell. Upon arriving in Detroit, Sam begs Dean to go live a normal life with his old flame Lisa Braeden and says his goodbyes to Bobby and Castiel. He then proceeds to confront Lucifer, who reveals that he knows about their plan. Seeing no other options left, Sam says yes anyway. A bright light shines and Dean looks upon an unconscious Sam as he opens the portal to Lucifer's prison. Although "Sam" says that he has Lucifer under control, it is shown that Lucifer was just taunting Dean. Lucifer closes the portal and takes the rings before disappearing. At an unknown location, Sam continues to fight Lucifer internally for control over his body. While talking through a mirror, Lucifer tries to persuade Sam to embrace their union by slaughtering demons that were watching Sam throughout his entire life.

During Lucifer's confrontation at Stull Cemetery with Michael (using Adam as his vessel), he beats Dean, slamming him against the door of the Impala. As Lucifer is about to deliver a fatal blow, he catches a glimpse of a toy soldier stuck in the car's ash tray triggering Sam's memory of jamming the soldier in there as a boy. The sudden arousal of Sam's childhood memories and those of the bond of brotherhood he shares with Dean allows him to overpower Lucifer and regain control of his body. Sam takes out the rings, reopens the portal, and prepares to throw himself in. Having been temporarily banished by Castiel, Michael returns and attempts to stop him, but Sam jumps in, pulling Michael also with him – trapping both Lucifer and Michael in Lucifer's cage. The ground closes up with a stunned, devastated Dean watching. Later, it is shown that Dean fulfills his promise to Sam and has gone back to find Lisa. As he sits down with her and Ben for dinner, a street light outside goes out, and underneath it inexplicably is Sam secretly watching the three with a blank look on his face.

=== Season 6 ===
Almost a year has passed since Sam went to Hell, and he reappears to Dean after saving him from Djinn poisoning. Upon their reunion, Sam reveals that he has been back this whole time searching for whatever force brought him back and hunting with his mother's side of the family, the Campbells, led by their grandfather Samuel who was also resurrected. While hunting with Sam again, Dean quickly notices how different he acts. These include using a baby as bait, allowing a child to go through a torturous treatment to gain information, and allowing Dean to become a vampire. After facing the goddess, Veritas, Dean and Castiel question Sam's behavior. Castiel then reveals that Sam's soul is not with him and is still trapped in Lucifer's Cage. It is revealed that Crowley brought back Sam and Samuel Campbell so that they could help him find Purgatory, the afterlife of monsters, and that Samuel has been working for him. Crowley then states that if Sam and Dean help him he will return Sam's soul, but if they do not help him he will send Sam back to Hell. Although Sam still retains his memories, likes, dislikes, and is capable of making rational decisions, he is completely without emotion and appears almost inhuman.

Upon Dean's request, Death retrieves Sam's soul from the Cage and returns it to him at the end of the sixth season's mid-season finale "Appointment in Samarra". He gives Sam's mind a "protective wall" to prevent any negative effects it might have on him otherwise, but Death also warns him not to scratch at the wall he has built, or his memories from Hell will destroy him. However, Castiel, in an attempt to distract Dean and Bobby while he attempts to enter Purgatory, brings down the wall, ultimately causing Sam to remember his time in Hell. In the season finale, Sam spends much of the episode attempting to recoup his shattered soul, including the memories of his soulless self and tortured self. Once complete, he reawakens, though still struggling with the visions of the Cage that his soul endured.

=== Season 7 ===
After Castiel's actions result in the release of the Leviathans – God's first beasts – Sam is left struggling with the restoration of his memories of his time in Hell, even if he remains dedicated to helping Dean and others stop the Leviathans. During this time, he has a reunion with his old Kitsune friend, Amy Pond, who has become a mortician feeding on the dead to sustain her, although Dean nevertheless kills her when he discovers that she has been killing to help her sick son. As Sam experiences hallucinations of Lucifer taunting him with the idea that he is still in Hell, he initially tries to control them by focusing on wounds he sustains in the real world, but matters become worse when he is forced to rely on information from the hallucination to save Dean. As his mental state becomes worse, Sam foregoes sleep to stop his visions, but is sent to an asylum when he is hit by a car while running away from Lucifer. While trying to find a healer who may be able to repair Sam, Dean encounters an amnesiac Castiel, who, when restored to his full powers, sacrifices himself by taking Sam's mental damage. Sam is shown to possess great guilt about this and rejects hope that Bobby's ghost may be helping them out after an attempt to communicate with him fails. Sam is initially happy when it is shown that Bobby's ghost is there helping them, but changes his mind after Bobby shows more and more signs of becoming a vengeful spirit. During the final battle at Sucrocorp, Sam rescues Kevin Tran – a Prophet who can read the Word of God – and is horrified to hear of Dick Roman's plan to kill all the skinny people in the world through poison in their coffee creamers. He and Kevin head to the lab where they find Dick Roman being killed by Dean and Castiel. After Dick explodes, Dean and Castiel disappear and Crowley appears and takes Kevin, leaving Sam completely on his own, not knowing Dean and Castiel are now trapped in Purgatory.

=== Season 8 ===
The year Sam spends while Dean and Castiel are trapped in Purgatory is revealed through various flashbacks in the first half of the season. Now left on his own, Sam believes that Dean had been killed when Dick exploded, and gives up hunting. After several months, he accidentally runs over a stray dog and, panicked, takes it to an animal hospital. The veterinarian who saves the dog's life – Amelia Richardson – convinces Sam to take responsibility for the stray by adopting it. Despite a rocky start, Sam and Amelia fall in love and even buy a house together in Kermit, Texas. They later find out that her husband Don, who she had believed was killed in action, was actually still alive. Sam wants to stay with Amelia, but ultimately decides to leave and give her the opportunity to reconnect with Don.

In the season premiere "We Need to Talk About Kevin", Sam runs into Dean and learns that Dean had just escaped from Purgatory; upon learning about what Sam had been doing the past year, Dean is upset that Sam had not even tried to save him or continued hunting. They find out that Kevin had managed to escape from Crowley six months ago and left Sam a string of desperate voice messages, begging for help. Sam feels guilty and joins Dean in tracking down Kevin, who reveals that he has discovered a passage in the Word of God that would banish all demons from Earth forever. The spell requires three trials be performed by one person. Although Dean tries to do it himself in order to protect Sam from any possible consequence of the trials, Sam ends up completing the first trial (killing a hellhound and bathing in its blood) in "Trial and Error" to protect Dean; he persuades his brother to let him finish the rest by reasoning that Dean would be all-too-willing to sacrifice himself for the trials whereas Sam would fight so that both of them could live. However, taking on the trials quickly begins "damaging" Sam, which worries Dean.

After meeting Benny – the vampire who helped Dean escape from Purgatory in exchange for Dean resurrecting him – at the end of "Blood Brother", Sam immediately distrusts him, and asks Martin (a friend of their father's who had previously appeared in Season 5's "Sam, Interrupted") to monitor Benny. Martin contacts Sam in "Citizen Fang" to tell him that he believes Benny killed somebody, bringing the Winchesters to Carencro, Louisiana, to help investigate. However, upon receiving an emergency text from Amelia and being unable to get a hold of her, Sam tears back to Kermit. He finds Amelia happily reunited with Don, and realizes that the text had been a trick by Dean to divert him from Benny. Enraged, Sam initially refuses to continue hunting with Dean in the following episode. Castiel – who has been mysteriously rescued from Purgatory – enlists his help in saving the angel Samandriel from being tortured by Crowley, forcing the brothers to reluctantly work together again. When forced by both Dean and Amelia to choose, Sam decides to rejoin his brother and fully commit himself to sealing Hell over returning to his normal life with Amelia. Around this time, Sam and Dean encounter their time-traveling paternal grandfather Henry Winchester and discover that through him, they are the legacies to an extinct secret society of compilers of supernatural information and artifacts known as the Men of Letters. Although they manage to subdue the demonic Abaddon, who has pursued Henry into the present, their grandfather is killed, leaving Sam and Dean the last link to the Men of Letters. They then inherit the bunker of the Men of Letters as their first real home.

Sam completes the second trial – saving an innocent soul (in this case, Bobby) from Hell and sending it to Heaven – in "Taxi Driver" with the help of Benny, who sacrifices himself in the process of guiding Sam and Bobby out of Hell and thus finally causes Sam to admit to Dean that he had been wrong about Benny. Unfortunately, Sam's illness from the trials worsens to the point that Dean temporarily restricts him from hunting out of worry for his condition. Nevertheless, Sam remains determined to finish the trials and seal Hell because, viewing all the times he has failed Dean in the past (such as not looking for him when he was in Purgatory) as his worst sins, he has become obsessed with not letting Dean down anymore. He and Dean attempt to use Abaddon for the third trial, that of restoring a demon's humanity, but she escapes while they are distracted by a call from Crowley, who has begun murdering everyone they have ever saved to force them to call off the trials. After Crowley kills Sam's love interest, Sarah Blake from Season 1's "Provenance", Sam is devastated and briefly contemplates giving in to Crowley's demands, but he and Dean ultimately feign surrender to lure Crowley to them and take him prisoner in the season finale "Sacrifice" so that they can use him for the third trial instead. Sam is on the verge of fully restoring Crowley's humanity when Dean finds out that completing the trials will kill Sam. Although Sam, having fallen into deep guilt and despair due to him feeling as he always lets Dean down, wants to finish the trials anyway, Dean assures him that nothing will ever be more important than him and manages to calm him down. The effects of the trials remain, however, leaving Sam in dire condition in the final moments of the finale.

=== Season 9 ===
Sam is close to death in the premiere, "I Think I'm Gonna Like It Here"; it is revealed that the trials have severely burned his internal organs as well as cut off oxygen-flow to his brain, and that he has virtually no chance of survival. Having slipped into a coma, Sam has a dream in which he realizes that he is dying and struggles between whether or not he should even try to fight, eventually electing to let himself die with the guarantee that this time he cannot be revived and cause any more damage. However, the angel Gadreel is called in by Dean to save Sam through any means necessary. Disguised as Dean, Gadreel convinces Sam to let him save him and Sam agrees, unwittingly providing permission to Gadreel so that the angel can possess him due to Gadreel's ambiguously-worded question. Gadreel spends the next eight episodes healing Sam from within without Sam realizing it. In fact, Sam is completely unaware of Gadreel's presence, as the angel spends most of this time laying dormant in Sam's subconscious and he and Dean go to some lengths to prevent him finding out about it because Sam could prematurely expel Gadreel if he found out.

Sam is alerted to Gadreel's possession of him by Crowley in the later episode "Road Trip", at which point he revokes his permission and forcibly expels Gadreel from his body by ordering the angel out. To his horror, he also finds out that Gadreel has killed Kevin using his body to prove his loyalty to Metatron. Sam is appalled and angry at how far Dean will go to keep him alive, feeling betrayed that Dean not only helped Gadreel possess him and hid the truth from him but also for persuaded him not to finish the trials and thus kept the gates of Hell open and allowed demons to continue wreaking havoc, all to keep Sam alive. Sam lets a guilt-ridden Dean leave at the end of the episode. In the following episode "First Born", Sam works with Castiel to extract a lingering piece of Gadreel's grace (angelic energy) so that they can track him. Feeling guilty over the deaths he could have stopped, especially Kevin's, Sam urges Castiel to extract all of the grace still inside him, even though it may kill Sam because the grace is keeping him from reverting to his deathly state prior his possession. However, Castiel refuses to risk Sam's life. As a result, the amount of grace they gather is insufficient to track Gadreel.

Sam runs into Dean on the same case in "Sharp Teeth". Although Dean tries to divert Sam from the case so that they will not have to work together again, Sam reveals that he is willing to work with Dean again so long as it is on a strictly professional basis, telling him that they cannot work on a brotherly basis anymore because Dean has lost his trust. At the end of "The Purge", Sam responds to Dean's attempts to justify his decisions by saying that Dean's choices are not as selfless as Dean paints them and that he would not have done what Dean did given the same situation, which stuns Dean into silence.

The two eventually begin to come back together as Sam learns more about Abaddon's history and plans after he learns that she has been taking souls while leaving the victims 'alive', much like he was after his escape from Hell. They eventually manage to determine the location of a portal to Heaven that allows Castiel to trap Metatron while Dean kills Abaddon with the First Blade – acquired from Cain himself and the only weapon capable of killing a Knight of Hell – but Castiel is left dying of the grace he stole to regain his powers while Dean is transformed into a demon due to the First Blade's influence.

=== Season 10 ===
After spending six weeks tracking the transformed Dean – along with a brief confrontation with a man named Cole whose father was killed by Dean on a prior hunt – Sam manages to capture Dean while he is distracted, taking him back to the bunker to treat him with the demon cure. Despite demon-Dean's attempts to undermine his and Sam's relationship through his demonically-warped perspective, Sam is eventually able to cure Dean and restore him to humanity, although he continues to be concerned about Dean's emotional state after his time as a demon and the possibility that the Mark of Cain could transform him again. After Dean kills their ancestor Cain, Sam is weary of his brother and wants to free him of the curse.

When Dean meets with Death, he offers to remove Dean from society on the condition that he kill Sam because he will likely intervene. Although he initially agrees, Sam is nearly killed by Dean who soon relents and kills Death instead. However, due to Sam's earlier machinations, the Mark is removed and the Darkness is unleashed regardless.

=== Season 11 ===
With the Darkness unleashed, Sam and Dean set out to try to find the Darkness, but are shaken to learn that the entity they are hunting is God's sister, who was imprisoned by God and the Archangels so that he could create the world. Manifesting as a human soul who comes to call herself Amara, Sam learns Dean is drawn to her from an eternal bond as Dean was the one who freed her, but matters become even more complicated when Castiel consents to act the vessel for Lucifer when he becomes convinced that only an archangel has any chance against Amara. This strategy fails – speculated to be due to Lucifer's status as a fallen archangel – but the Winchesters are eventually contacted by the true God, now revealed to be Chuck Surely, the author who wrote the Winchester Gospels, who is able to make peace with Amara and depart. Sam briefly believes Dean is dead and is kidnapped by a mysterious woman.

=== Season 12 ===
Sam is kidnapped by the British branch of the Men of Letters who torture him but he resists. Sam is later reunited with his brother and mother attack the Winchesters to try to take control of America's hunters and Lucifer is left on the run trying to find a new vessel. Lucifer eventually takes the President of the United States as a vessel, but the Winchesters are able to banish him from this host.

While the Winchesters discover that Lucifer conceived a child while possessing the President, they are left to guard the child's mother while Mary explores the possibility of an alliance with the British Men of Letters. Although Castiel concludes that Lucifer's child is worth protecting, the potential alliance with the Men of Letters ends when the group prove to be excessively ruthless, to the point of killing a hunter, Eileen Leahy, who had assisted the Winchesters on a case because she accidentally killed one of their members.

=== Season 13 ===
The Winchesters are eventually able to banish Lucifer to a parallel universe where the Apocalypse took place 'on schedule', in 2012, but this plan backfired when Lucifer alerted the alternate version of Michael to the existence of the original world, as well as leaving them with the complication of trying to raise Lucifer's suddenly-adult son, Jack Kline. (Jack is 6 months old, chronologically). Sam bonds with Jack who soon comes to see the Winchesters and a resurrected Castiel as his 'fathers', while they gain a new ally when they discover that Gabriel survived his death, in season 5, but although they are able to return to the Apocalypse World to rescue several humans (including alternate versions of Bobby Singer and Charlie Bradbury), the alternate Michael, and Lucifer follow them into this world.

Stuck for options to stop Lucifer after he takes Jack's grace to charge his own powers, Sam is beaten by the Archangel until Dean agrees to act as Michael's vessel. Sam watches Dean defeats Lucifer, but is stunned when Michael takes control of Dean's body after Lucifer's death.

=== Season 14 ===
With Michael using Dean's body, Sam spends the next few weeks leading the refugees of Apocalypse world in hunts or adjusting to the new world. Sam later uses his reputation as a legendary hunter to abolish the position of Ruler of Hell, to any demon who seek to take control of Hell.

Sam is briefly reunited with his brother when Michael abandons Dean to continue his own plans while wearing down Dean's willingness to resist, but although Michael eventually takes Dean as his vessel again, with the aid of his family Dean is able to trap Michael in his subconscious. When Dean starts creating the Malik box, Sam is informed of his brother's plan but Dean accepts Sam's argument that they will still try and find another way first.

Sam is briefly reunited with his father after a pearl with magical abilities grants him that which his heart desires. Although Dean hoped that his heart desire would be Michael out of his head, the family reunion was heart touching. John was forced to return to his own time before an alternate time line could ensue.

Still abandoning his plan to seal himself in the Malik box, Sam accompanies Dean, Castiel, and Jack in a fairly routine hunt. During this, Sam tends to Dean when he gets knocked unconscious only to wake and find that Michael has escaped his mind. After slaughtering many hunters in his wake, Michael tortures the Winchesters but is confronted and killed by Jack Kline, who uses his soul to draw on his angelic abilities. In killing Michael, Jack not only burned off his soul, but also absorbed the grace of Michael, restoring him to his powerful state as a Nephilim. Due to this, Sam becomes increasingly more concerned with the condition of Jack's soul.

Parallel to this, the previous vessel of Lucifer, Nick, engages in a plan to raise Lucifer from the empty. Jack is able to stop him in a grotesque killing which leaves Mary Winchester in a state of deep concern. Jack becomes frustrated and accidentally uses his powers to kill Mary. Dean finds out about his mother's death and starts into a fit of anger fueled by grief. On a mission to kill Jack, Chuck makes an appearance, supplying a gun which will do to the holder what it does to the victim. Sam is shocked when Dean accepts this as a solution for his building anger towards Jack but Sam becomes skeptical of God's intention and soon finds Dean aiming, point blank, at Jack. Dean realizes that this is not the solution and drops the gun, eliciting an angered response from Chuck. Sam, Dean, and Castiel begin to realize that their lives have been nothing more than entertainment to Chuck, while he pulls the strings. Chuck kills Jack and Sam shoots God who soon releases every evil spirit from hell to attack the trio in a dramatic show of frustration, with a prequel statement "Story's over. Welcome to the end." Sam characteristically takes a fighting stance as the swarm engulfs him, his brother, and Castiel.

=== Season 15 ===
After Chuck brings on the end breaking open the gates of hell, Sam, Dean, Castiel deals with the after effects dealing with a horde of zombies and ghosts. Sam meanwhile, discovers through nightmares and flashes of what he believes are God's memories that he's connected to Chuck through the gunshot wound that is not healing. While this is all going on Sam deals with his guilt from killing Rowena while also becoming close to Eileen, after he resurrected her with a spell.

Chuck traps Eileen and Sam and forces Sam to witness multiple possible futures, as what was preventing the gunshot wound from healing from Sam's hope that Sam, Dean, and all their allies would defeat Chuck. At the end Sam loses his hope, Chuck returns to full strength and Eileen leaves to deal with the events that Chuck put in place that made her a pawn to use against Sam.

With Chuck back at full health, he takes away whatever luck that Sam and Dean had that prevented them from experiences normal things like a common cold or toothache, as the answer a call from Garth. Garth after saving Sam and Dean tells the boys of a place in Alaska that deals in luck/fortune. Sam discovers that they are dealing with the Goddess Fortuna and after a high stake pool game between the Goddess and Sam, where Sam loses, Dean and Sam's luck is restored as the Goddess Fortuna wants Chuck dealt with.

In the series finale, after Dean dies, Sam leaves the bunker behind for good, taking their dog, Miracle, with him. Over the years, Sam has a family and a son, whom he named after his brother, grows old and dies of natural causes. After Sam's death, he and Dean are reunited in Heaven.

== Powers and abilities ==
Sam's supernatural abilities are the result of him being fed Azazel's demon blood while he was an infant. Sam exhibits signs of precognition throughout the first season, manifesting as dreams of others' deaths and later as visions. Sam has also shown signs of sensing spirits, once displayed telekinesis, and immunity to certain demonic powers. Sam states that his abilities are connected to Azazel and anything related to his actions, such as the other special children. This argument was further proven after Azazel's death, as Sam stopped having visions of both the demon and the other psychics, however, according to Ruby his powers were simply dormant. After training with Ruby, Sam develops new abilities, such as exorcising demons with his mind, and his telekinesis becomes more potent. By drinking demon blood Sam's power become stronger, to the point where he can outright kill demons and even torture them while in their human hosts; by drinking at least three gallons of demon blood, he can kill demons just by concentrating and willing it to happen. After being affected by the Horseman Famine, Sam uses his powers to defeat him by attacking the demon spirits that Famine had recently consumed, although Dean and Bobby were subsequently forced to lock Sam in the panic room to detox.

In addition, with the training given to him by his father, Sam is a skilled fighter, proficient with firearms, shotguns and melee weapons. Like his brother, Dean, he possesses many abilities that are frowned upon by law, including but not limited to: lock picking, computer hacking, disguised conning, and carjacking. Throughout the series, Sam has been shown to be highly intelligent with reading and recalling Latin incantations, which can be used to summon, exorcise, and vanquish demons; typically, when the two brothers are working together, Dean is the superior physical fighter while Sam's expertise lies in carrying out research and recalling information to determine the nature of the threat that they are currently facing. Through Ruby, he knows how to make hex bags to cloak himself from demons and angels. Sam also displays the ability to read one's "poker face" and has a great sense of direction and time, at one point being able to find a vampire's nest while blindfolded by keeping track of the time and the turns of the car.
