= Alona Tal =

Israeli actress and singer (born 1983)

- אלונה טל
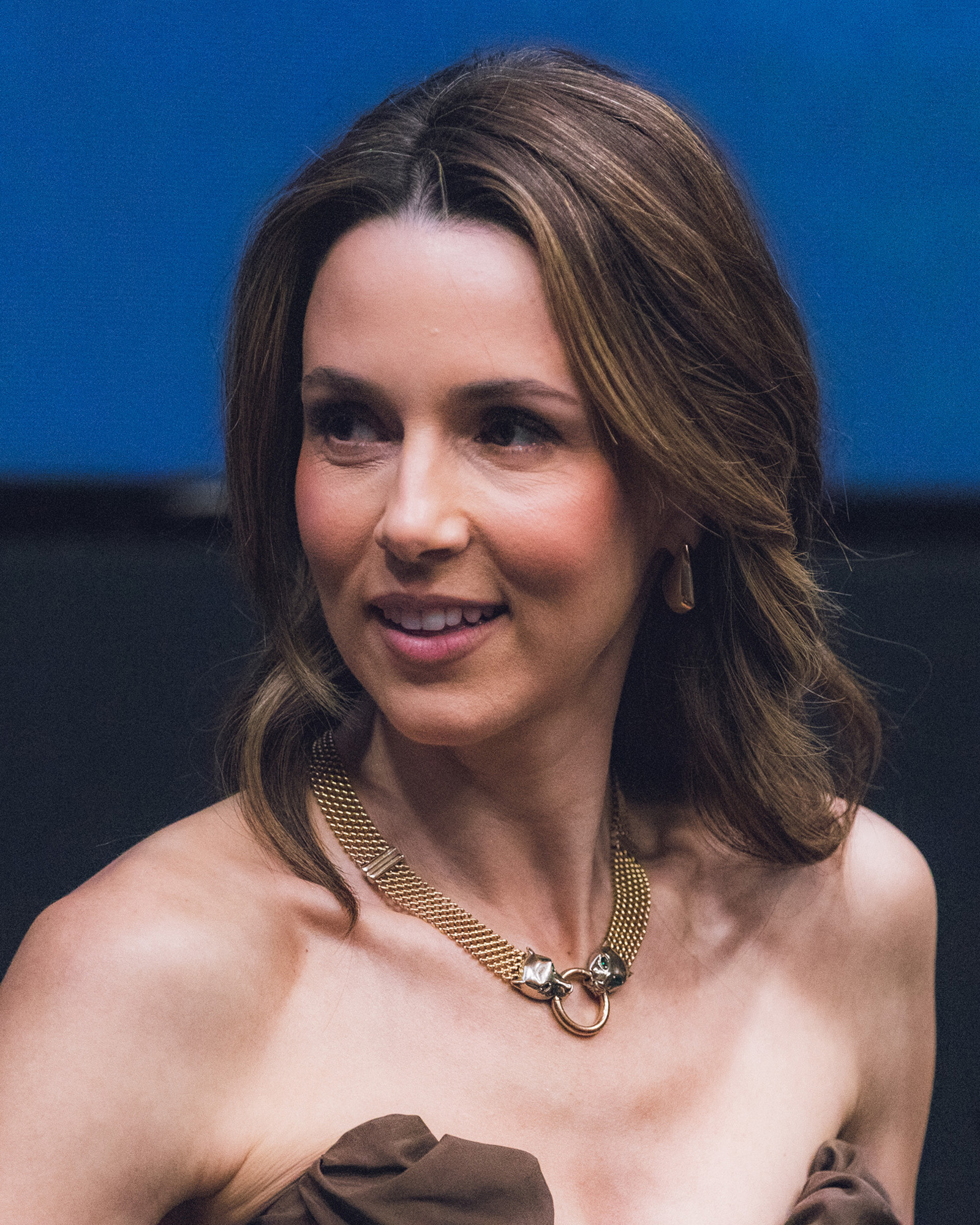
- Tal at a Cross Q&A in 2026
- Born: 20 October 1983 (age 43); Herzliya, Israel
- Occupations: Actress; singer
- Years active: 2003–present
- Height: 1.63 m (5 ft 4 in)
- Spouse: Marcos A. Ferraez (m. 2005)
- Children: 2

Alona Tal (Hebrew: אלונה טל, IPA: [aˈlona ˈtal]; born 20 October 1983) is an Israeli actress and singer. She is known for her roles in Veronica Mars as the cheerleader Meg Manning, in Supernatural as budding monster hunter Jo Harvelle, as Sonya Lebedenko in the final season of Burn Notice, as grad student Stella Baxter in SEAL Team, and as FBI agent Kayla Craig in Cross.

== Early life ==
Alona Tal was born and raised in Herzliya, Israel. Her father Ami Tal is a computer professional, whereas her mother Ayala (née Sabat) is a lawyer of Polish-Jewish descent. Both her parents were born in Israel. Her parents divorced when she was 9. She has two sisters as well as two half-sisters from her father's later relationship. She attended the Thelma Yellin High School in Givatayim, Israel, majoring in theatre. She is Jewish and has described herself as a "spiritual person". She served in the military theatre of the Israel Defense Forces (IDF).

== Career ==
Tal began her career while still doing her military service, with a children's musical video tape in which she played an evil witch. Following that, she appeared in a commercial for a laundry detergent, and then appeared in the lead role in the Israeli film Lihiyot Kochav (To Be A Star; 2003).

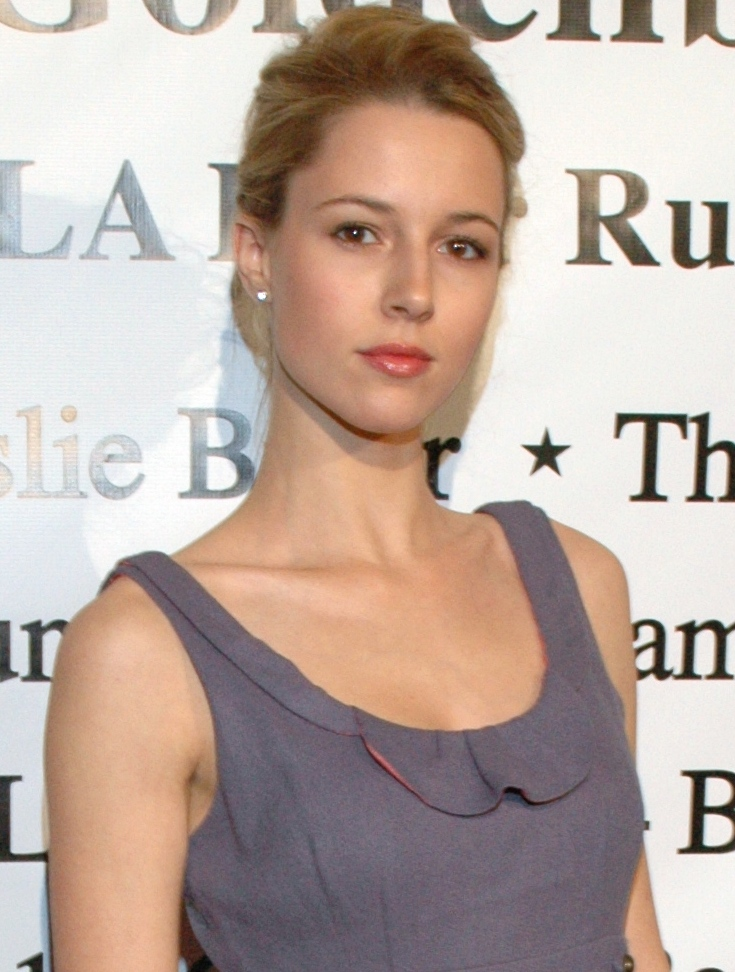
Tal at the Children Uniting Nations Academy Award Viewing Party in 2009

During the filming of the movie Tal was offered two roles in two different Israeli television shows, and she took both. The first was a soap opera named Tzimerim, about the life of a family that runs a hotel; the second one was HaPijamot (The Pyjamas), a sitcom about a struggling band determined to make it in the real world. She took part in the first three seasons and later took part as a guest star which gave her the chance to show her musical talent. Although she was the main character only in the first three seasons, she appeared in the fourth season for several episodes.

Tal also appeared in the music video for "Final Warning", by Skylar Grey.

Tal moved to New York City, where she recorded a song with Wyclef Jean (the song "Party to Damascus" has Tal singing the chorus in Hebrew).

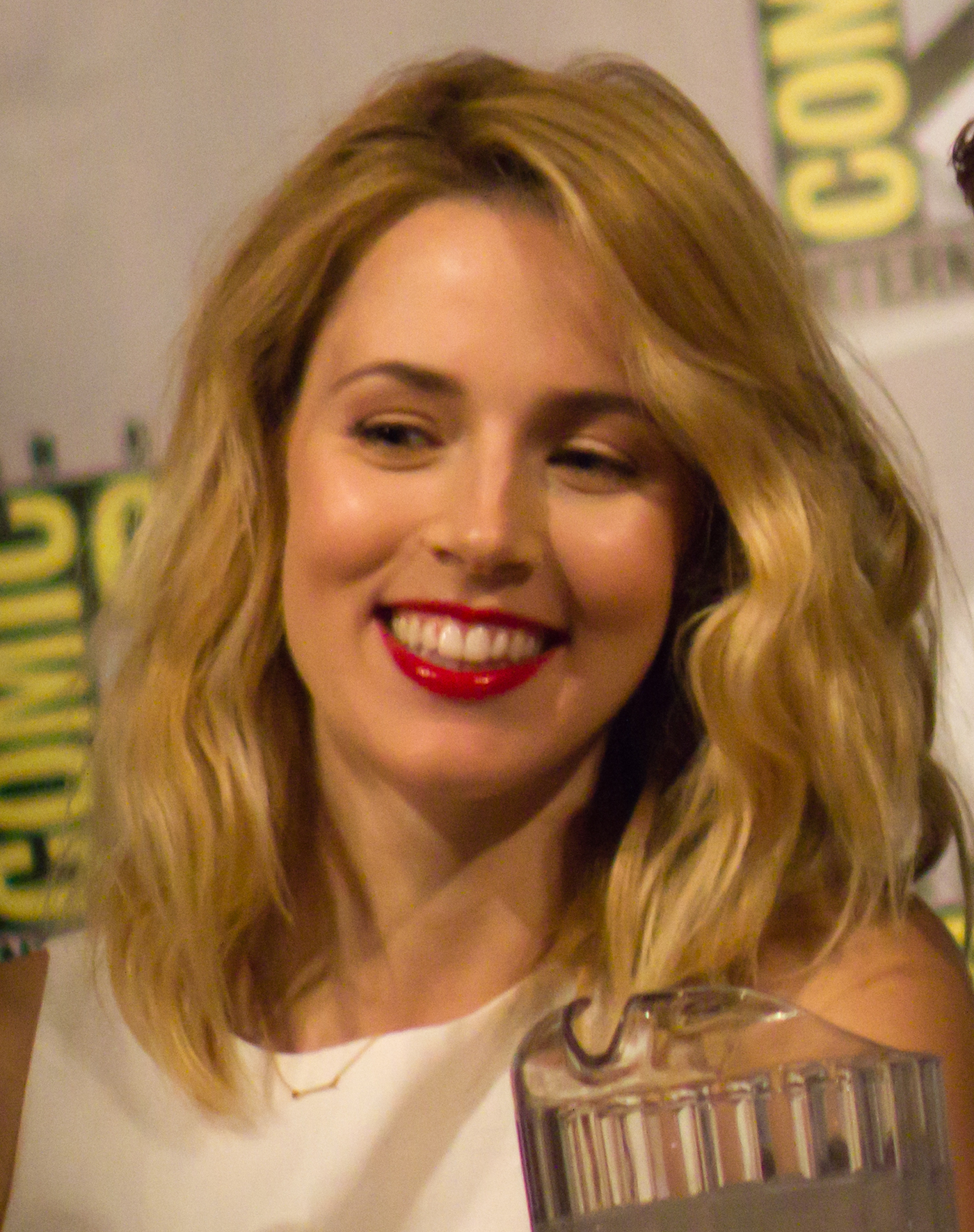
Tal in 2015.

After her discharge Tal moved to Los Angeles, having agreed with her mother that she would return to Israel if nothing happened within four years; her older sister, then living in New York, helped her settle in. A chance acquaintance with someone in the industry led to an audition for Veronica Mars. She did not get the lead role, but found an agent, and a role was later written for her in the series. She played Meg Manning, one of Veronica Mars's few friends. She also played the recurring role Jo Harvelle on the second, fifth, and seventh seasons of Supernatural. Tal also guest-starred on the series finale of Monk as Adrian Monk's stepdaughter, Molly Evans. She also played the role of Devon Thompson in the movie "Taking 5" in 2007. In 2010, she performed the voice of Catherine-B320 (also known as Kat) in the video game Halo: Reach. In 2013, she starred in the mystery series Cult. She played the role of "Sonya" in the seventh and final season of Burn Notice.

In November 2020, Tal was cast as Ivy in the second season of the drama series Truth be Told.

She was later cast as Chloe MacKenzie on Fire Country.

== Personal life ==
Tal met American actor and director Marcos A. Ferraez at an acting workshop in Los Angeles shortly after she arrived there, and they married in Israel on 23 March 2005. Tal announced on 23 October 2016, at a Supernatural panel that she was expecting her first child. She celebrated her pregnancy with a baby shower on 29 January 2017. Guests included fellow Israeli actresses Gal Gadot and Noa Tishby. She has two daughters, born in March 2017 and September 2022.

== Filmography ==
=== Film ===
Year	Title	Role	Notes
2002	Pim Pam Po In the Magic Castle	Shusha the Witch	Original title: Pim Pam Po BeArmon HaKsamim
2003	To Be a Star	Lilach	Original title: Lihiyot Kochav
2007	Taking 5	Devon Thompson	
2007	Half Past Dead 2	Ellie Burke	Direct-to-video film
2008	College	Gina Hedlund	
2010	Undocumented	Liz	
2010	Kalamity	Ashley	
2013	Broken City	Katy	
2014	Rescuing Madison	Madison	
2015	Night of the Living Dead: Darkest Dawn	Helen Cooper	Voice role
2016	Opening Night	Chloe	
2022	Grimcutty	Melinda Jaynes	
2024	Guns & Moses	Hindy Zaltzman	

=== Television ===
Year	Title	Role	Notes
2003	Tzimerim	Maya	Israeli TV series
2003–2004, 2006	HaPijamot	Alona Tal	Main role (seasons 1–3)
2004–2006	Veronica Mars	Meg Manning	Recurring role (seasons 1–2), 10 episodes
2005	CSI: Crime Scene Investigation	Tally Jordan	Episode: "Room Service"
2006	Cold Case	Sally (1988)	Episode: "8 Years"
2006	7th Heaven	Simon's Mystery Friend	Episode: "Highway to Cell"
2006	Commander in Chief	Courtney Winters	Episode: "State of the Unions"
2006	Split Decision	Bex Christensen	Television film
2006–2007; 2009; 2011	Supernatural	Jo Harvelle	Recurring role (season 2); Guest role (seasons 5, 7)
2007	Frangela	Sara	Television film
2007	Cane	Rebecca King Vega	Main role
2008	The Cleaner	Jackie Kemp	Episode: "Rag Dolls"
2008	Ghost Whisperer	Fiona Raine	Episode: "Firestarter"
2009	The Mentalist	Natalie	Episode: "Crimson Casanova"
2009	Knight Rider	Julie Nelson	Episode: "Knight and the City"
2009	Party Down	Heather	Episode: "California College Conservative Union Caucus"
2009	Monk	Molly Evans	Episode: "Mr. Monk and the End: Part 2"
2010	Independent Lens	Hannah Senesh	Voice role; episode: "Blessed Is the Match"
2010	Lie to Me	Becky Turley	Episode: "React to Contact"
2010	Leverage	Kaye Lynn Gold	Episode: "The Studio Job"
2010	The Defenders	Ashley	Episode: "Nevada v. Carter"
2011	Pretty Little Liars	Simone	Episode: "Careful What U Wish 4"
2011	Prime Minister's Children	Libi Agmon	Main role
2011	The Killing	Aleena Drizocki	Episode: "Beau Soleil"
2011	Against the Wall	Nicki	Episodes: "Baby, Did a Bad Thing", "Lean on Me or Die"
2011	Three Inches	Lily Thereoux	Television film
2012	Powers	Zora	Pilot television film (released on the Internet only)
2013	Cult	Kelly Collins	Main role
2013	Burn Notice	Sonya	Recurring role (season 7), 8 episodes
2016	Hostages	Zohar	Main role (season 2)
2014–2017	Hand of God	Jocelyn Harris	Main role
2017–2024	SEAL Team	Stella	Recurring role
2019	The Spy	Julia Schneider	Episode: "What's New, Buenos Aires?"
2020	Little Fires Everywhere	Young Linda McCullough	Episode: "The Uncanny"
2020	Away	Young Miriam	Episode: "A Little Faith"
2021	Truth Be Told	Ivy Abbott	Recurring role (season 2)
2024	Law & Order	Deborah	Episode
2024–present	Cross	Kayla Craig	Main role
2025–present	Fire Country	Chloe McKenzie	10 episodes

=== Video games ===
Year	Title	Role	Notes
2010	Halo: Reach	Kat	Voice role
2019	Gears 5	Kat	Voice role; guest appearance
