= Samantha Ferris =

Canadian actress

- Born: Samantha Ferris; November 2, 1968 (age 56); North Vancouver, British Columbia, Canada
- Occupation: Actress
- Years active: 1996–present

Samantha Ferris (born November 2, 1968) is a Canadian actress, best known for her starring role as Nina Jarvis on The 4400 and her recurring role as Ellen Harvelle on Supernatural.

== Career ==
Ferris began her career as a radio announcer and in the mid-1990s was a television reporter for the Bellingham, Washington station KVOS-TV 12 and Vancouver's BCTV, where she went by the name Janie Ferris.

After the death of her father she decided to change careers and become an actress. She has had many starring and supporting television roles, her most notable being Sandra Cassandra on Beggars and Choosers, Nina Jarvis on The 4400, Lt. Alexa Brenner on The Evidence and Ellen Harvelle on Supernatural. Other television roles include that of deckhand Pollux in the episode "Dirty Hands" of Battlestar Galactica, as well as roles in Smallville, Stargate SG-1, The L Word, V and a series of TV movies featuring The Gourmet Detective.

== Filmography ==
=== Film ===
| Year | Title | Role | Notes |
|---|---|---|---|
| 2001 | Along Came a Spider | Mrs. Hume | |
| 2001 | Blackwoods | Waitress / Beth | |
| 2006 | Gray Matters | Elaine | |
| 2007 | Butterfly on a Wheel | Diane | AKA, Shattered |
| 2009 | Grace | Patricia Lang | |
| 2010 | Icarus | Kerr | AKA, The Killing Machine |
| 2012 | The Tall Man | Tracy | |
| 2018 | Valley of the Lanterns | Bookmaker | |

=== Television ===
| Year | Title | Role | Notes |
|---|---|---|---|
| 1996 | Saber Marionette J | Panther (voice) | TV series |
| 1998 | The Inspectors | Lauren Urbina | TV film |
| 1998 | The New Addams Family | Lacey | "Wednesday Leaves Home" |
| 1999 | Stargate SG-1 | Dr. Raully | "Out of Mind", "Into the Fire" |
| 1999–2001 | Beggars and Choosers | Sandra Cassandra | Recurring role |
| 2000 | The Inspectors 2: A Shred of Evidence | Lauren Urbina | TV film |
| 2000 | Mobile Suit Gundam Wing | Sally Po (voice) | "Go Forth, Gundam Team" |
| 2000 | Mobile Suit Gundam Wing: The Movie - Endless Waltz | Sally Po (voice) | TV film |
| 2000 | First Wave | Alice | "Mabus" |
| 2000 | So Weird | Miranda Scott | "Still Life" |
| 2001 | Beyond Belief: Fact or Fiction | Suzanne | "Grass on the Grave" |
| 2001 | Earth Maiden Arjuna | Teresa Wong (voice) | TV miniseries |
| 2001 | The Chris Isaak Show | Dana Farrard | "Behind the Isaak" |
| 2002 | Da Vinci's Inquest | Dolores Williams | "Simple, Sad" |
| 2002 | Glory Days | Helen | "The Devil Made Me Do It" |
| 2003 | A Date with Darkness: The Trial and Capture of Andrew Luster | Det. Katherine Cooke | TV film |
| 2004 | Smallville | Warden Anita Stone | "Scare" |
| 2004 | The Ranch | Taylor | TV film |
| 2005 | The L Word | Meryl Rothman | "Luminous" |
| 2005 | Personal Effects | Gail Feldman | TV film |
| 2005 | Da Vinci's Inquest | Const. Samantha Townsend | "Must Be a Night for Fires" |
| 2005 | Reunion | Emily Fisher | "1989" |
| 2005–2006 | The 4400 | Nina Jarvis | Main role |
| 2006 | The Collector | Tessa | "The Media Baron" |
| 2006 | The Evidence | Lt. Alexa Brenner | Regular role |
| 2006 | Reunion | Emily Fisher | "1997" |
| 2006 | Last Chance Cafe | Madge Beardsley | TV film |
| 2006–2011 | Supernatural | Ellen Harvelle | 9 episodes |
| 2007 | Battlestar Galactica | Pollux | "Dirty Hands" |
| 2007 | Witness to Murder | Shawna | TV film |
| 2007 | Enemy Within | Hines | TV film |
| 2008 | NYC: Tornado Terror | Lillian | TV film |
| 2009 | Impact | Renee Ferguson | TV miniseries |
| 2010 | Human Target | Deputy Director Lynch | "Baptiste" |
| 2010 | Seven Deadly Sins | Diana Morgan | "1.2" |
| 2010 | Hiccups | Bambi Weeks | "You Schmooze, You Lose" |
| 2010 | V | Private Investigator | "Pound of Flesh", "Fruition" |
| 2011 | V | Felicia Castro | "Birth Pangs" |
| 2012 | Smart Cookies | Hazel Hillburn | TV film |
| 2013 | Emily Owens, M.D. | Marian Camphill | "The Love of Larping" |
| 2013 | R. L. Stine's The Haunting Hour: The Series | Carolyn | "Detention" |
| 2013 | Let It Snow | Sally | TV film |
| 2014 | R. L. Stine's The Haunting Hour: The Series | Mother | "Grandpa's Glasses" |
| 2015 | Exposed | Nancy Grace Type | TV film |
| 2015 | Backstrom | Rebecca Forrester | "Dragon Slayer" |
| 2015–2017; 2020 | Gourmet Detective film series | Capt. Forsyth | Hallmark Movies & Mysteries films |
| 2015 | Mistresses | Det. Libby Whitehead | Recurring role |
| 2016 | Newlywed and Dead | Annie Ward | TV film |
| 2016 | The Irresistible Blueberry Farm | Paula | Hallmark Channel film |
| 2016 | Looks Like Christmas | Jill Higgins | Hallmark Channel film |
| 2017 | Somewhere Between | Capt. Kendra Sarneau | Regular role |
| 2017 | Hit the Road | Linda Shapiro | "It's My Party", "Kush" |
| 2018 | Six | Kate Kilcannon | Recurring role |
| 2018 | Garage Sale Mystery: The Mask Murder | Michelle | Hallmark Movies & Mysteries film |
| 2018 | Salvation | Director Evelyn Davis | Recurring role (season 2) |
| 2022 | Devil in Ohio | Rhoda Morrison | TV miniseries; 4 episodes |
| 2022 | Batwoman | Director of the GCPS | 1 episode |
| 2023 | Picture of Her | Aunt Dody | Hallmark Channel movie |
| 2024 | When Calls the Heart | Maisie Hickam | Recurring role |

=== Video games ===
| Year | Title | Role | Notes |
|---|---|---|---|
| 2003 | CSI: Crime Scene Investigation | Mrs. Wilkinson | |
| 2004 | CSI: Dark Motives | Leslie Handleman | |
| 2005 | SSX on Tour | Zoe Payne | |
| 2022 | New Tales from the Borderlands | Susan Coldwell | |
