= Supernatural season 15 =

Season of television series

Supernatural
- Season 15
- DVD cover art
- Showrunners: Andrew Dabb; Robert Singer
- Starring: Jared Padalecki; Jensen Ackles; Alexander Calvert; Misha Collins
- No. of episodes: 20

Release
- Original network: The CW
- Original release: October 10, 2019 – November 19, 2020

Season chronology
- ← Previous; Season 14

The fifteenth and final season of Supernatural, an American dark fantasy television series created by Eric Kripke, premiered on The CW on October 10, 2019. The series was initially set to conclude on May 18, 2020, but a hiatus occurred after the March 23, 2020, episode owing to production delays caused by the COVID-19 pandemic in the United States. The season resumed airing on October 8, 2020, and the series finale aired on November 19, 2020. The season consisted of 20 episodes and aired on Thursdays at 8:00 pm (ET), with the exception of two March 2020 episodes aired Mondays at 8:00 pm. This was the fourth season with Andrew Dabb and Robert Singer as showrunners. The season follows Sam, Dean, and Castiel's battle against God, who has been manipulating events in their lives including their family, friends, and allies. Angered by their decision to fight Him, God jumpstarts the end of everything in creation.

== Cast ==
=== Starring ===
- Jared Padalecki as Sam Winchester
- Jensen Ackles as Dean Winchester
- Alexander Calvert as Jack Kline and Belphegor (Note: Only credited for their respective episode appearances.)
- Misha Collins as Castiel

=== Special guest stars ===
- Jim Beaver as Bobby Singer
- DJ Qualls as Garth Fitzgerald IV
- Mark Pellegrino as Lucifer

=== Guest stars ===
- Ruth Connell as Rowena MacLeod
- David Haydn-Jones as Arthur Ketch
- Osric Chau as Kevin Tran
- Rob Benedict as Chuck Shurley / God
- Emily Swallow as Amara / The Darkness
- Emily Perkins as Becky Rosen
- Ty Olsson as Benny Lafitte
- Anna Grace Barlow as Lilith / Ashley Monroe
- Shoshannah Stern as Eileen Leahy
- Christian Kane as Lee Webb
- Dimitri Vantis as Sergei
- Jake Abel as Adam Milligan and Michael
- Keith Szarabajka as Donatello Redfield
- Kim Rhodes as Sheriff Jody Mills
- Lisa Berry as Billie / Death
- Sarah Smyth as Bess Fitzgerald
- Yadira Guevara-Prip as Kaia Nieves and Dark Kaia
- Genevieve Padalecki as Ruby
- Danneel Ackles as Sister Jo / Anael
- Rachel Miner as The Shadow / The Empty
- Meagen Fay as Mrs. Butters
- Paxton Singleton as Young Dean Winchester
- Christian Michael Cooper as Young Sam Winchester
- Alessandro Juliani as Adam
- Felicia Day as Charlie Bradbury
- Briana Buckmaster as Donna Hanscum
- Christine Chatelain as Jenny
- Spencer Borgeson as Dean Winchester II

== Episodes ==
No. overall	No. in season	Title	Directed by	Written by	Original release date	Prod. code	U.S. viewers (millions)
308	1	"Back and to the Future"	John F. Showalter	Andrew Dabb	October 10, 2019	T13.21752	1.23
The Winchesters and Castiel barricade themselves in a mausoleum in an attempt to escape the zombie horde. While trying to find a way out, the demon Belphegor possesses Jack's corpse and offers his help, blasting the souls out of the reanimated corpses. With an infestation of ghosts on the loose, the three reluctantly form an alliance with the demon. With the nearby town of Harlan, Kansas in danger, the Winchesters and Castiel begin an evacuation while facing off with many ghosts, including former enemies Constance Welch, Mary Worthington and John Wayne Gacy. The group manages to safely evacuate most of the town and Belphegor casts a spell that traps the ghosts inside the abandoned town. However, he reveals that there were two to three billion souls in Hell who were all released when Chuck opened the doors. Additionally, this opened Lucifer's Cage, potentially releasing Michael to wreak havoc as well. Castiel proves unable to heal Sam's gunshot wound from when he tried to kill Chuck and discovers a strange energy he has never felt before blocking Castiel's powers. With only a day or two to sort things out before the real authorities show up, Sam suggests that if they stop the end of the world this time, they will truly be free as Chuck has abandoned their world as he did other worlds in the past such as Apocalypse World.
309	2	"Raising Hell"	Robert Singer	Brad Buckner & Eugenie Ross-Leming	October 17, 2019	T13.21753	1.16
Still in Harlan, Kansas, the Winchesters and their hunter allies struggle to contain both the ghosts and the restless citizens as the barrier begins to weaken. Led by Francis Tumblety, better known as the infamous serial killer Jack the Ripper, the ghosts plot their escape while killing as many people as they can. The Winchesters are joined by Rowena, who works on a spell to more permanently contain the ghosts and Arthur Ketch who reveals he was hired by a demon named Ardat to assassinate Belphegor. To their surprise, Sam and Dean also receive help from the ghost of Kevin Tran who had been cast into Hell instead of Heaven as Chuck claimed. The Winchesters succeed in containing the ghosts in a crystal, but more rise from Hell. Having learned that he cannot go to Heaven, Kevin decides to wander the Earth as a ghost rather than risk returning to Hell. At the same time, Chuck seeks the help of Amara in Reno, Nevada. Chuck is revealed to have been severely weakened and diminished when Sam shot him and Amara, seeing that her brother hasn't changed from the petulant narcissistic being he always was, refuses to help and abandons her brother who is trapped on Earth and has developed a link with Sam.
310	3	"The Rupture"	Charles Beeson	Robert Berens	October 24, 2019	T13.21754	1.24
Rowena attempts to use a spell from the Book of the Damned to strengthen the barrier, but discovers that the barrier is too weak and will inevitably fall. Belphegor offers a solution where they retrieve Lilith's crook from Hell and use it to draw in all of the escaped souls and demons while Sam and Rowena perform a spell to close the rupture. At the same time, the demon Ardat brutally murders Arthur Ketch while seeking out Belphegor who travels into Hell with Castiel. After they retrieve the crook, Ardat attacks, revealing that Belphegor is using the Winchesters to gain power in Hell for himself. Belphegor kills Ardat and attempts to draw all of the souls and demons inside of himself to gain unlimited power, but is smitten by Castiel, destroying the crook. With no other way, Rowena decides to use a spell that requires the sacrifice of her own life to draw the souls and demons inside of herself and then travel into Hell. At Rowena's request, Sam reluctantly fatally stabs Rowena who casts the souls and demons back into Hell. Sam and Dean are left devastated by the losses of Arthur and Rowena and Dean accuses Castiel of being responsible for everything going wrong. Realizing that Dean still blames him for Mary's death, Castiel reveals that his powers are failing and, believing he is no longer wanted by the Winchesters, leaves the bunker.
311	4	"Atomic Monsters"	Jensen Ackles	Davy Perez	November 7, 2019	T13.21751	1.10
Sam experiences a nightmare where he, under the influence of demon blood, appears to be leading several demons and kills several hunters including Dean and his old vampire friend Benny. Still reeling from the death of Rowena, Sam reluctantly joins Dean on a hunt in Beaverdale, Iowa where the head cheerleader, Susie, was apparently killed by a vampire and another cheerleader, Tory, was abducted. Using security footage of the abduction, the Winchesters identify Susie's boyfriend Billy's family as the culprits and rescue Tory. Billy was recently turned into a vampire and accidentally killed Susie when he lost control of his bloodlust. Though his parents have been trying to protect him, a guilt-ridden Billy recognizes that he has become a monster and has his parents blame the murder and kidnapping on him while the Winchesters take Billy out into the woods to kill him. While Dean wants to continue fighting monsters for the sake of the people who have believed in them, Sam displays a more cynical and depressed view. At the same time, God visits Becky Rosen, having lost his sense of purpose. Becky convinces him to start writing again, but is horrified by the dark ending God has in mind for the Winchesters. God makes Becky and her family vanish and begins preparing his plan to bring the Winchesters to a dark end.
312	5	"Proverbs 17:3"	Richard Speight Jr.	Steve Yockey	November 14, 2019	T13.21755	1.30
Sam continues to have nightmares of dark alternate worlds. After five strange deaths in Black Forest, Colorado, the Winchesters investigate and quickly learn that they are dealing with werewolves. The werewolves, brothers Andy and Josh, kidnap the last survivor of their attacks after Dean unexpectedly falls asleep. However, Andy, who hates what they are doing, kills his brother and then himself. The girl the Winchesters were protecting turns out to be Lilith, resurrected by God from the Empty and in search of The Equalizer, the gun God created to kill Jack. Lilith destroys the gun and reveals that God's intended endgame is for the Winchesters to kill each other. Sam speculates that his dreams are him seeing God's possible endings due to the link created when he shot God. Though Sam refuses to give up, Dean believes the situation to be bleak.
313	6	"Golden Time"	John F. Showalter	Meredith Glynn	November 21, 2019	T13.21756	1.14
The Winchesters are surprised when the ghost of their old friend Eileen Leahy arrives seeking their help. Eileen's soul was dragged to Hell by the hellhound that killed her, but she managed to escape when God opened Hell. As Eileen fears returning to Hell or going insane, Dean suggests using Rowena's journals to create a Soul Catcher to contain her. However, Sam finds a resurrection spell Rowena was creating that could potentially bring Eileen back to life. The spell brings him into conflict with two witches who seek the spell for their own use. With the help of Dean and Eileen, Sam dispatches the witches, using a spell he learned from Rowena to kill one. At the same time, Castiel enjoys a vacation until he learns of a series of strange deaths in the area. Suspecting a djinn, Castiel helps a mother whose son has gone missing, ultimately discovering the local sheriff to be the culprit. Castiel kills the djinn with his angel blade and decides to return to helping people. At the end of the episode, Sam succeeds in using Rowena's spell to resurrect Eileen and asks for Dean to help him again rather than give up.
314	7	"Last Call"	Amyn Kaderali	Jeremy Adams	December 5, 2019	T13.21757	1.06
After learning of the disappearance of teenager Angela Sullivan in Texhoma, Texas, Dean decides to investigate the case on his own and is surprised to run into old friend Lee Webb whom Dean hunted with alongside his father when he was younger. After enjoying catching up with Lee, Dean manages to locate Angela's body and discovers that Lee is the culprit, having kidnapped and fed people to a creature called a marid in exchange for riches and health. Lee explains that after a particularly bad hunt, he developed a view that the world is broken and he is owed to enjoy himself. Dean is able to kill the marid and reluctantly kills Lee, feeling that Lee is a monster and it is his duty as a hunter. At the same time, Castiel meets up with Sam and Eileen and suggests exploring Sam's link with God to learn more, but it backfires and makes Sam unconscious. Castiel and Eileen call in the shaman Sergei who demands the Key to Death to fix Sam, but with the help of Bobby Singer, Castiel is able to force Sergei to help by threatening his niece. After Dean returns, Sam reveals that he has seen into God's memories and learned that God is weak. As a result, Sam expresses confidence that he, Dean, Castiel, and Eileen can beat God.
315	8	"Our Father, Who Aren't in Heaven"	Richard Speight Jr.	Eugenie Ross-Leming & Brad Buckner	December 12, 2019	T13.21758	1.09
In an effort to defeat God, Dean has Donatello search the demon tablet for any clues that might help them. Donatello discovers from Metatron's notes that God has a secret fear that he only shared with his favorite, but God briefly takes control of Donatello and threatens to destroy everything they love if they don't stop. Refusing to stop and suspecting God's favorite to be Michael, the Winchesters and Castiel travel into Hell where they learn that Rowena has become the new Queen of Hell. Rowena's demons discover that Michael is no longer in Hell and she urges Dean and Castiel to mend their relationship. Having escaped the Cage, Michael now shares control of his body with Adam, but is left directionless and kills Lilith when the demon tries to take him to God. The Winchesters and Castiel capture Michael and attempt to convince him to help them with the assistance of Adam, but the archangel refuses to hear them out. Instead, Castiel shows Michael his memories of several of God's betrayals including the war with the Darkness, the alternate reality Michael and the murder of Jack. Completely disillusioned, Michael reveals that God can be trapped and provides them with the spell to do it. The spell requires a flower that only exists in Purgatory and Michael opens a twelve-hour portal for them but refuses to stay and help. At the same time, another hunter seeks Eileen's help with a vampire case and Sam accompanies her when things start to go wrong. However, it turns out to be a trap set by God.
316	9	"The Trap"	Robert Singer	Robert Berens	January 16, 2020	T13.21759	1.13
Having captured Sam and Eileen, God reveals that he purposefully led Sam to resurrect Eileen in order to use Eileen to get at Sam. God attempts to use Eileen to cut out the thing which is festering in Sam that is blocking God's ability to heal the wound, only to realize that it is hope. In response, God shows Sam the future if they win, where monsters run increasingly rampant upon the Earth, both innocent people and their friends die, and Castiel has to be locked in the Ma'lak Box after going crazy from taking the Mark of Cain. Sam and Dean are eventually turned into vampires and during a final confrontation, Dean kills Jody Mills before Sam is killed by Bobby. God explains that the monsters running rampant is a consequence of locking him away: without God around, darkness prevails in the world. At the same time, Dean and Castiel return to Purgatory in search of a Leviathan Blossom which they learn sprouts from the remains of a Leviathan. The two are ambushed by Leviathans working for a vengeful Eve, but manage to escape with the blossom and make up. Dean and Castiel attempt to use the spell to trap God, but Sam refuses to complete it, allowing God to heal his wound and regain his full power. God reveals that Sam's visions were actually God's memories of alternate Sam and Dean and he is confident that they will end the same before departing. In the aftermath, Sam and Eileen share a kiss, but Eileen decides to leave for the time being. Despite everything, Sam still believes that God was telling the truth about what will come if he is trapped and Dean vows to find another solution. In the Empty, Billie tells Jack that "it's time."
317	10	"The Heroes' Journey"	John F. Showalter	Andrew Dabb	January 23, 2020	T13.21760	0.99
As Garth calls them for help, Sam and Dean begin experiencing regular people issues such as cavities, getting sick and car trouble. Garth suggests that because they were the heroes of God's story, God protected them in the past from such regular problems but has since downgraded them back to normal people. Garth's wife Bess reveals that her cousin Brad was found badly wounded from a Wraith attack. Brad explains that he was attempting to make money in an underground monster fight club that the Winchesters attempt to shut down. However, the Winchesters now being normal people works against them and they are captured to be pitted against a massive vampire named Maul. Garth rescues the Winchesters, blows up the fight club and kills Maul, causing Dean to suggest that Garth was the true hero of the story this time. The Winchesters decide to travel to Alaska to check out a rumor Garth heard about a place where they could regain their luck, knowing that they can't defeat God as normal people.
318	11	"The Gamblers"	Charles Beeson	Story by : Meredith Glynn & Davy Perez; Teleplay by : Meredith Glynn	January 30, 2020	T13.21761	1.07
The Winchesters seek out the place Garth told them about in Alaska which turns out to be a bar where people bet their luck in games of pool. The pool hall is revealed to be run by the goddess Fortuna who explains that her kind were in fact created by God and she holds a grudge against him. Though Fortuna wins, Sam and Dean impress her as being true heroes and she chooses to restore their luck anyway. At the same time, Castiel receives a call about a man who was murdered by having his heart ripped out and eaten and to Castiel's shock, the culprit is a resurrected Jack. Castiel discovers that Jack is targeting Grigori, fallen angels who have been feeding on the souls of innocent people, one of whom had murdered Claire Novak's mother nearly five years before. After Castiel rescues Jack from a Grigori, the Winchester family is finally reunited. Jack explains that Billie kept him hidden in the Empty, waiting for God to leave to resurrect him. Jack has been following Billie's plan which, if he continues to follow it, will make Jack strong enough to kill God.
319	12	"Galaxy Brain"	Richard Speight Jr.	Story by : Meredith Glynn & Robert Berens; Teleplay by : Robert Berens	March 16, 2020	T13.21762	0.98
Four weeks ago on Earth 2, God explains to a store clerk his creation of alternate worlds and his decision to end them all. As the Winchesters and Castiel deal with the return of Jack, who is still soulless, Jody Mills is kidnapped by Dark Kaia who demands that they keep their promise to her and send Dark Kaia back to the Bad Place. Dark Kaia reveals that the Bad Place is dying and that their Kaia is still alive, trapped in the other world. Horrified that Kaia has been trapped for two years in another universe, the group attempts to find a way back, hindered by Jack's inability to use his powers without drawing attention. Jack eventually convinces a Reaper named Merle to help them temporarily hide his use of powers from God, allowing the Winchesters and Dark Kaia to cross to the Bad Place and rescue their Kaia. Dark Kaia chooses to die with her world as it is consumed while Kaia returns home with Jody to be reunited with Claire. In the aftermath, Billie kills Merle for her failure to keep Jack in check and warns that they must all play their parts if they are to beat God. Billie reveals that one of the books in her library describes God's ultimate demise, but refuses to explain more than the fact that Jack and the Winchesters are an integral part of it. Satisfied with the destruction he has wrought, God departs Earth 2 to continue destroying other worlds.
320	13	"Destiny's Child"	Amyn Kaderali	Brad Buckner & Eugenie Ross-Leming	March 23, 2020	T13.21763	1.06
Billie warns the Winchesters that God is almost done destroying alternate universes and will soon turn his attention back to their own world. To continue Jack's quest to become stronger, Billie directs them to find the Occultum, a mysterious mystical object. The Winchesters track the Occultum to Anael who reveals that she gave it to Ruby before she died and Ruby hid it in Hell. However, this proves to be a trap as Anael hires demons to kill the Winchesters. In order to find out where it is really hidden, Castiel has Jack send him into the Empty where the Shadow, manifesting in the form of Meg, allows him to awaken Ruby. In exchange for Castiel promising to try to get her out, Ruby directs him to the Occultum's hiding place though Castiel is briefly tortured by the Shadow before Jack gets him out again. To keep God from knowing what they are up to, the Winchesters rescue a pair of alternate versions of themselves trapped between worlds and have their counterparts pose as them. Though attacked by hellhounds guarding the Occultum, they are able to retrieve it and the Occultum transports Jack to the Garden of Eden where he is confronted by a mysterious young girl and the Snake before being returned to Earth. In the aftermath, the alternate Sam and Dean depart for new lives in Brazil while a crying Jack expresses remorse for Mary Winchester's death and begs forgiveness. To Sam and Dean's shock, Castiel reveals that the Garden of Eden has restored Jack's lost soul.
321	14	"Last Holiday"	Eduardo Sánchez	Jeremy Adams	October 8, 2020	T13.21764	1.13
While taking care of some plumbing issues in the bunker, Dean accidentally releases a wood nymph named Mrs. Butters who served the Men of Letters before they were wiped out by Abaddon. With Mrs. Butters' help, the Winchesters go on many successful hunts, celebrating several holidays with Mrs. Butters and Jack and having time to enjoy life between fighting monsters. However, Jack finds a video by Magnus that reveals that he tortured and indoctrinated Mrs. Butters to a black and white view of non-human threats after rescuing her from the Thule. Convinced that as the son of Lucifer Jack is a threat, Mrs. Butters locks him and Dean up when Dean refuses to kill Jack, and she tortures Sam to get him to see what she believes to be the truth. Dean and Jack break out and convince Mrs. Butters that she is wrong and was only used by Magnus, getting her to stand down. At their suggestion, Mrs. Butters returns to her home forest, but the experience gives Dean a greater appreciation for enjoying the smaller things in life, and he throws Jack a birthday party. At the same time, Jack experiences doubts about his ability to kill Chuck and Amara and continues experiencing guilt over his role in Mary Winchester's death.
322	15	"Gimme Shelter"	Matt Cohen	Davy Perez	October 15, 2020	T13.21765	1.07
The Winchesters track down Amara who reveals that she and Chuck were conjoined twins and their separation is what caused the Big Bang; Amara refuses to help the Winchesters with their claimed plan of locking Chuck away as a result until Dean confronts her over Amara's inaction and the resurrection of his mother. At the same time, Castiel and Jack investigate a murder, learning from Zack, a Crossroads Demon, that Rowena has forbidden demon deals and that they are dealing with a human enemy. Desperately bored, Zack requests to help them solve the case but is rejected. Despite this, Castiel and Jack continue working the case with Jack going undercover at a local community center run by a pastor who has brought together people from many different religions. The killer is revealed to be the pastor's daughter Sylvia who is targeting people she feels have sinned; Castiel and Jack subdue Sylvia and Castiel heals her surviving victims. However, the police officer who takes Sylvia away is Zack, suggesting that he is going to disobey Rowena's orders to no longer make deals or is trying to help out in his own way. Jack reveals to Castiel that Billie's spell is turning him into a bomb that will cause Chuck and Amara to cease to exist, but will kill Jack as well. As a result, Castiel leaves to search for another solution, but first tells Dean that there's something that Dean needs to know.
323	16	"Drag Me Away (From You)"	Amyn Kaderali	Meghan Fitzmartin	October 22, 2020	T13.21766	0.92
In January 1993, Sam and Dean check into a motel in Wadsworth, Ohio while John is on a hunt and befriend siblings Caitlin and Travis. The four discover that local kids have fallen victim to a monster who is apparently killed by Dean during a struggle. In the present, Travis is killed and Caitlin calls the Winchesters back, convinced that the monster has returned. Sam determines that they are dealing with Baba Yaga, whose ring had been cut off by Dean in the fight, but the ring was later retrieved and repaired by Travis, resulting in her return. Dean is able to destroy the ring and kill Baba Yaga before she can harm anyone else. At the same time, Dean receives a visit from Billie who reveals that Chuck is done destroying other worlds and will soon return. Billie has given Jack his final mission to get ready, but according to Chuck's book in her library, her role is now over until the end. Dean later tells Sam the truth about Jack's impending death, having been informed of it by Castiel; Dean is convinced that Billie's plan is the only way while Sam is angered and devastated by the news.
324	17	"Unity"	Catriona McKenzie	Meredith Glynn	October 29, 2020	T13.21767	0.91
God returns to the Winchesters' world, causing Jack and Dean to embark upon the final quest left to them by Billie. Following Billie's instructions, they discover Adam, the First Man, who is the true architect of the plan to kill God. After Jack passes his test, Adam provides Jack with one of his ribs, explaining that the power it contains will combine with Jack's soul and grace to turn him into a black hole that will suck in anything divine, including Chuck and Amara. Unconvinced of the plan, Sam locates the key to Death's Library in the bunker and encounters the Shadow who reveals that Billie has actually been manipulating the whole situation so that she can take over once God and Amara are dead, the being's trust in Billie having been shaken by Castiel's earlier visit to the Empty. Sam convinces the Shadow that they are on the same side and to let him take Chuck's Death book. At the same time, Amara attempts to convince Chuck to stop and failing that, traps him in the bunker so that the Winchesters can trap him for good. However, Chuck reveals that this is another one of his plans to get Sam and Dean to kill each other, having manipulated time and space to get them there. Despondent over Dean's betrayal, Amara allows Chuck to absorb her, but his plan fails as Sam is able to talk Dean down. Enraged, Chuck decides that he no longer cares what happens and departs as Jack begins to detonate.
325	18	"Despair"	Richard Speight Jr.	Robert Berens	November 5, 2020	T13.21768	1.02
Billie teleports Jack to the Empty where he survives his detonation; however, the Shadow indicates that something has gone terribly wrong as Jack has made the usually silent Empty loud. Billie, confirming the Shadow's claims about her plans, forces Sam to turn over Chuck's Death book in exchange for bringing Jack back; after reading what the book now says, Billie attempts to leave with Jack but is wounded with her own scythe by Dean, forcing her to leave without a now-powerless Jack, the book or her scythe. Shortly thereafter, the people from Apocalypse World begin vanishing from existence and Sam works with Charlie, Bobby, Donna, and Jack to protect them while Dean and Castiel hunt down Billie. Billie reveals that Chuck is responsible, not her, as he causes what is every living thing in the world to vanish aside from the Winchesters, Castiel, and Jack. Mortally wounded by Dean's earlier attack, Billie chases and corners Dean and Castiel for revenge, and Castiel realizes that only the Shadow can stop her. Castiel reveals his deal to a stunned Dean and decides to sacrifice himself so that Dean can live, finally experiencing his moment of true happiness by confessing that he loves Dean. The Shadow opens a portal and absorbs both Billie and Castiel into the Empty. Having failed to save their friends, Sam and Jack realize that everyone else in the world is gone, while Dean ignores their calls, heartbroken over Castiel's death.
326	19	"Inherit the Earth"	John F. Showalter	Eugenie Ross-Leming & Brad Buckner	November 12, 2020	T13.21769	1.00
Chuck reveals that he intends the Winchesters and Jack to live with their failure on a completely lifeless Earth as punishment for their actions, killing Miracle, a dog that they find that he missed. Jack leads the Winchesters to Michael, who reveals that Adam is gone too and agrees to help them, but even he can't open Chuck's Death book. Shortly thereafter, a resurrected Lucifer arrives, claiming to have been sent by the Shadow to help them kill God; Lucifer kills Betty, a Reaper, and turns her into the new Death to read the book. Once the book is open, Lucifer kills Betty and reveals that God brought him back to retrieve the book; after a brief fight, Michael kills Lucifer with the Archangel Blade. Using the Book of the Damned, the Winchesters find a spell in the book that can destroy God, but are betrayed by Michael in an attempt to become God's Favorite once again. Chuck kills Michael and beats the Winchesters nearly to death, but is drained of his power by Jack. Sam and Dean explain that the attempt to turn Jack into a cosmic bomb had also turned him into a power vacuum that absorbed the energy from the conflicts around him, allowing Jack to become strong enough to drain God; having anticipated Michael's betrayal they had used the archangel to lure Chuck into a trap. With Chuck now powerless and mortal, the three decide to leave him to live out a human life, die and be forgotten. Now the new God, Jack restores the world to normal, but departs for Heaven, choosing to avoid Chuck’s mistakes by not interfering with the choices made by humanity. Finally free of Chuck's influence for good, the Winchesters revel in the chance to write their own story.
327	20	"Carry On"	Robert Singer	Andrew Dabb	November 19, 2020	T13.21770	1.38
Six months after the defeat of Chuck, Sam and Dean adapt to living regular lives again with Dean adopting Miracle, the dog that he had previously found. However, a strange murder and kidnapping by masked vampires draws the Winchesters into a case that they realize their father had worked in 1986 but was never able to solve. The Winchesters capture one of the vampires using the pattern that John had established and force him to lead them to the nest. One of the vampires is Jenny, who the Winchesters had encountered during their first hunt. The Winchesters are able to take out all of the vampires, but Dean is impaled upon a metal spike during the fight and dies after an emotional goodbye with Sam. In Heaven, Dean is reunited with Bobby Singer, who reveals that Jack reshaped Heaven with Castiel's help to be a much better place where everyone can be together instead of separated. Dean drives off through Heaven in the Impala while Sam has a family and a son, whom he named after his brother, grows old, and dies of natural causes. Sam then reunites with Dean in Heaven, on a version of the bridge first seen in the pilot episode.

== Production ==
On January 31, 2019, The CW renewed the series for a fifteenth season. On March 22, series stars Jared Padalecki, Jensen Ackles, and Misha Collins announced that the 20-episode fifteenth season of Supernatural would also be its last, making it the longest-running series on The CW. Ackles, who last directed the episode "The Bad Seed" from the eleventh season, directed the first episode filmed for the season, which aired chronologically as the fourth episode. Other cast members directing episodes for the season include returning director Richard Speight Jr. and young John Winchester actor Matt Cohen. Jake Abel reprises his role as the Winchesters' long-lost half-brother Adam Milligan, who last appeared in the fifth-season finale.

The series finale was originally set to air on May 18, 2020; however, on March 12, 2020, Warner Bros. Television shut down production on the series due to the COVID-19 pandemic. On March 23, showrunner Andrew Dabb revealed that the season would go on hiatus after the March 23 episode. Dabb clarified that the series had completed production on 18 of the 20 episodes for the season, but the post-production process could not be completed on the episodes because of the shutdown due to the virus outbreak. Dabb also assured that the series' cast and crew, The CW, and Warner Bros. were fully committed to filming and airing the unproduced episodes with its proper finale. On August 17, 2020, The CW announced that the season would resume airing on October 8, 2020, and the series finale aired on November 19, which was preceded by a special titled The Long Road Home. Filming resumed on August 18, and concluded on September 10, 2020.

== Reception ==
=== Critical reception ===
Based on 13 reviews, the review aggregator website Rotten Tomatoes reports a 100% approval rating for Supernatural's fifteenth season with an average rating of 8.7/10.

=== Ratings ===
Viewership and ratings per episode of Supernatural season 15
No.	Title	Air date	Rating/share (18–49)	Viewers (millions)	DVR (18–49)	DVR viewers (millions)	Total (18–49)	Total viewers (millions)
1	"Back and to the Future"	October 10, 2019	0.4/2	1.23	0.2	0.72	0.6	1.95
2	"Raising Hell"	October 17, 2019	0.3/2	1.16	0.3	0.69	0.6	1.85
3	"The Rupture"	October 24, 2019	0.3/2	1.24	0.2	0.69	0.5	1.94
4	"Atomic Monsters"	November 7, 2019	0.3/2	1.10	0.3	0.77	0.6	1.88
5	"Proverbs 17:3"	November 14, 2019	0.3/2	1.30	0.3	0.73	0.6	2.03
6	"Golden Time"	November 21, 2019	0.2/1	1.14	0.3	0.79	0.5	1.93
7	"Last Call"	December 5, 2019	0.3/2	1.06	0.3	0.74	0.6	1.80
8	"Our Father, Who Aren’t in Heaven"	December 12, 2019	0.3/1	1.09	0.3	0.72	0.6	1.81
9	"The Trap"	January 16, 2020	0.3/2	1.13	0.3	0.80	0.6	1.93
10	"The Heroes' Journey"	January 23, 2020	0.2/1	0.99	0.3	0.77	0.5	1.76
11	"The Gamblers"	January 30, 2020	0.3/2	1.07	0.3	0.78	0.6	1.85
12	"Galaxy Brain"	March 16, 2020	0.2/1	0.98	0.2	0.68	0.5	1.66
13	"Destiny's Child"	March 23, 2020	0.3/1	1.06	0.3	0.75	0.5	1.81
14	"Last Holiday"	October 8, 2020	0.4/2	1.13	0.2	0.53	0.6	1.66
15	"Gimme Shelter"	October 15, 2020	0.3/2	1.07	—N/a	—N/a	—N/a	—N/a
16	"Drag Me Away (From You)"	October 22, 2020	0.3/2	0.92	0.2	0.54	0.5	1.46
17	"Unity"	October 29, 2020	0.2/1	0.91	0.2	0.49	0.4	1.40
18	"Despair"	November 5, 2020	0.3/1	1.02	0.2	0.58	0.5	1.60
19	"Inherit the Earth"	November 12, 2020	0.3/1	1.00	0.2	0.60	0.5	1.60
20	"Carry On"	November 19, 2020	0.3/1	1.38	—N/a	—N/a	—N/a	—N/a
