= Devil's Trap =

- Supernatural episode
- The demonically-possessed Meg Masters is caught beneath the titular devil's trap.
- Episode no.: Season 1 Episode 22
- Directed by: Kim Manners
- Written by: Eric Kripke
- Cinematography by: Serge Ladouceur
- Editing by: Anthony Pinker
- Production code: 2T6921
- Original air date: May 4, 2006

Guest appearances
- Jeffrey Dean Morgan as John Winchester and Azazel; Nicki Aycox as Meg Masters; Jim Beaver as Bobby Singer; Sebastian Spence as Tom

Episode chronology
← Previous "Salvation"	Next → "In My Time of Dying"
- Supernatural season 1

"Devil's Trap" is the twenty-second and final episode of the paranormal drama television series Supernatural's first season. It was first broadcast on The WB on May 4, 2006. The narrative follows series protagonists Sam (Jared Padalecki) and Dean Winchester (Jensen Ackles) as they search for their missing father (Jeffrey Dean Morgan), who has been kidnapped by demons.

Written by series creator Eric Kripke and directed by co-executive producer Kim Manners, the episode featured Nicki Aycox's final portrayal of recurring villain Meg Masters, and also introduced Jim Beaver as hunter and Winchester-ally Bobby Singer. Morgan's busy schedule affected the episode's storyline, and the final scene involved one of the toughest special effects sequences of the series.

This was the last episode of the series to air on The WB, as episodes aired after the first season was broadcast on The CW, due to a joint venture of The WB and UPN. The season finale was met with generally positive reviews, with critics praising the actors' performances and the twist ending.

== Plot ==
Trying to locate his father, Dean calls John Winchester's phone. The demonically-possessed Meg Masters (Aycox) answers it instead, and taunts him that his father has been captured. To determine a plan of action, Dean and his brother Sam (Padalecki) go to family friend and fellow hunter Bobby Singer (Beaver) for help. However, Meg tracks them down and attacks, but is quickly caught underneath a mystical symbol known as a "devil's trap" that the Winchesters and Bobby had painted on the ceiling; it renders demons immobile and powerless. Bobby informs the Winchesters that Meg is actually an innocent girl being possessed by a demon, so they begin to perform an exorcism. Dean promises to stop if she reveals the location of their father, and she relents, claiming he is being held in Jefferson City. Despite Bobby's warning that Meg will die from previously sustained injuries if the demon is exorcised, Dean insists that they go through with it, as it would be better than allowing the demon to continue to use her as a host. After the demon is sent to Hell, a dying Meg thanks them for freeing her. With her remaining strength, she warns them that the demons are setting a trap for them, and says, "By the river. Sunrise," before she dies.

This leads the brothers to the riverside Sunrise Apartments in Jefferson City, Missouri. The boys manage to overpower the demons guarding John, and rescue him. However, they are attacked by Meg's demonic brother Tom, and Dean is forced to kill him with one of the three remaining bullets of the Colt—a mystical gun capable of killing anything. When the Winchesters later find refuge in a secluded cabin, Azazel reveals himself to be possessing John. Dean, while being tortured by the demon, begs his father to break free and save him. John is able to temporarily gain control, and then begs Sam to use the Colt to kill Azazel. Unable to bring himself to kill his father, Sam instead shoots him in the leg, causing Azazel to flee to safety. The Winchesters rush towards the hospital, but their car is rammed into by a semi-trailer truck being driven by a demonically-possessed truck driver.

== Production ==
=== Guest stars ===
Actor Jeffrey Dean Morgan portrayed dual roles for the episode. He returned as Winchester patriarch John, and was also the first to play the on-screen physical manifestation of the demon Azazel—the character had been only depicted in silhouette. Morgan was given free rein over the latter's traits, only being directed to "be different from John". He changed his voice and modeled Azazel's speech pattern after Jack Nicholson's scenes in The Shining in which he "gets all freaky". This "Nicholson-esque quality" continues in later depictions of the demon.

Hunter and Winchester-ally Bobby Singer makes his debut, and is played by Jim Beaver. Beaver had worked with executive producer Robert Singer on the television series Reasonable Doubts, and Singer gave him the part without viewing his audition tape. The episode also features the final appearance of the demonically-possessed Meg Masters as played by Nicki Aycox. Director Kim Manners was sorry to see her go, as he felt Meg had the potential to become a "great nemesis" for the Winchesters.

=== Writing ===
The staff struggled throughout the writing process to decide which Winchester would be kidnapped and possessed, and were forced to revise the script multiple times to reflect the latest choice. Because of Jeffrey Dean Morgan's recurring role on Grey's Anatomy, however, the writers realized that he would not be available long enough to be a main focus of the episode. They thus decided late into production for John to be the one who is captured. With this finalized, Kripke found it rather easy to write the episode; he already knew that the key elements of the episode would be the exorcism of the demon possessing Meg, the death of the real Meg, and the apparent rescue of John Winchester. Kripke felt that it had to be John who was possessed by Azazel, as it united and completed the two main storylines of the season—finding their father and tracking down the demon—and it did so by finding both characters in one body. He found it a "happy accident" to be able to present the brothers with the opportunity to finally kill the demon, but at the cost of their father's life.

The writers believed John's separation from his sons throughout the season "split the show" by having him away "doing more interesting things than the boys are doing", with Kripke likewise feeling that John was keeping Sam and Dean away from the "front lines". His death would allow the brothers to "explore, investigate and confront the yellow-eyed demon directly". The writers originally intended for John to die at the episode's end, with Sam and Dean surviving the crash but John dying in their arms. His death, however, was pushed back into the second-season premiere because the writers deemed it too dark to kill John after everything else the brothers had gone through in "Devil's Trap".

=== Filming ===
Principal filming took place in Vancouver, British Columbia, with the crash scene being filmed on an old airport space with flat roads. However, other key sequences occurred in the studio. Because the fight scene between the Winchesters and Azazel at the climax was meant to take place in a secluded, forest-enclosed cabin, production built the set on a sound stage. Production designer Jerry Wanek felt the set was extremely important, as viewers would become uninterested if the forest looked fake. With Morgan rendered blind by the yellow contact lenses required to depict his character's demonic possession, the production crew placed sandbags on the floor to help the actor locate his marks.

According to Aycox, the exorcism of the demon from Meg Masters took two days to shoot; the first day of filming lasted 13 hours, while the second lasted for "about a half a day". Director Kim Manners used 360-degree shots and close-ups to make the sequence exciting. In the scene following the exorcism, in which Bobby is bent over a dying Meg, Aycox and Ackles read their lines off-screen so that Beaver's reaction could be shot. However, the two were "so slap-happy" to be almost done that they could not stop laughing; to everyone's surprise, Beaver was able to keep a straight face. The set—Bobby Singer's home—was filled with waist-high stacks of six thousand books.

=== Effects ===
The semi-trailer truck crashing into the Impala at the episode's end was deemed by special effects supervisor Randy Shymkiw to be, as of the third season's production, "probably the toughest 'gag' [he has] done". Many aspects went into creating the crash scene, with filming taking place both in the studio and on location.

For the interior scenes used to depict the first moments of the Impala being hit, the actors were required to sit in the car in front of a blue screen; this allowed for the truck's headlights to later be added in with visual effects. The car itself was attached to a separate rig that was built to replicate the impact of the crash. As the scene was shot, the rig flipped the car onto its side. The passenger-side window was then shattered, though the actors were protected by a sheet of Lexan that had been placed very close to the window; at the same time, cannons beneath the frame blew out pieces of rubber glass to give the appearance that the window had exploded onto them.

For the filming of the actual crash, the car and truck were cabled together by a winch and driven toward one another. The intention was for a cannon to launch the Impala into the air at the collision point, causing the car to barrel roll as the truck drives away. However, the car became stuck in the truck's bumper, forcing the cannon to fail and the truck to go out of control. The truck began to jackknife, but the stuntman driving it saved it from flipping. The mistake ended up being beneficial for the scene, as Kripke and director Manners found it to look "pretty real".

== Reception ==
On its initial broadcast, the episode was watched by 3.99 million viewers. It received generally positive reviews from critics. Karla Peterson of The San Diego Union-Tribune gave the episode an "A", deeming it "everything the season-closer needed to be". She noted that episode reveals why Azazel killed Jessica and Mary Winchester, and enjoyed the "creative way" Meg Masters was killed off, feeling the exorcism to be "amazing". Peterson also praised the cliffhanger ending, believing it to be "capable of pulling your eyeballs right out of your head". The acting was also praised, with Jensen Ackles being able to "wring every ounce of blood, sweat and torment out of Dean's photogenically haunted psyche", Jared Padalecki making Sam "real and conflicted", and Jeffrey Dean Morgan giving "his best and most believable performance of the season". Maureen Ryan of the Chicago Tribune collectively referred to "Devil's Trap" and its two preceding episodes as a "really strong trilogy" of "must-see episodes". She found the possessed John to be "Morgan's finest work on the show to date", believing that he "was really on fire in that scene" and "brought a whole new intensity to his performance". She also thought that Bobby Singer's introduction and Meg Masters' exorcism were "well done".

Diana Steenbergen of IGN also praised "Devil's Trap", deeming it to be the episode that "moved Supernatural from the list of television shows that [she] liked to the 'must-see' list". Like Peterson, she cheered the twist ending, and was "completely taken by surprise". Steenbergen also felt that Jim Beaver as hunter Bobby Singer was "an excellent addition to the cast", and applauded Ackles, Padalecki, and Morgan for their performances in the episode's climactic confrontation between Azazel and the brothers. She found the possessed Morgan to be "menacing", and enjoyed his sadistic sense of humor; Padalecki to have done a "good job embodying the newfound strength" Sam develops in defying his father's order to kill him in order to stop the demon; and Ackles' defenselessness to be "affecting". However, she believed that Azazel's reference to having a family "[didn't] quite make sense", and noted that it seemed implausible for Sam and Dean—having been raised as hunters—to not have known that Meg was a demonically-possessed girl. Brian Tallerico of UGO also had issues with the plot, though mainly with the episode's outcome. He felt that the writers should have followed Buffy the Vampire Slayer's pattern of killing off the season's foe, as "fans don't like villains to be strung out for too long". He also would have liked for John Winchester to have died in order to "free the brothers up for a little second season revenge and a little less family angst".
