= Takashi Taniguchi =

Japanese voice actor (1947–2012)

- 谷口 節
- Born: July 5, 1947; Hokkaido, Japan
- Died: December 27, 2012 (aged 65)
- Occupation: Voice actor
- Agent: Office Ōsawa

Takashi Taniguchi (谷口 節, Taniguchi Takashi; July 5, 1947 – December 27, 2012) was a Japanese voice actor from Hokkaido. He was last affiliated with Office Ōsawa at the time of his death.

== Death ==
Taniguchi died on December 27, 2012, at the age of 65. The following day, fellow voice actor Toshio Furukawa announced Taniguchi's death through Twitter upon receiving the news from his agency Office Ōsawa.

== Roles ==
=== Television animation ===
- Hellsing (Harry Anders)
- Hellsing Ultimate (Makube)
- One Piece (Montblanc Cricket)
- Rocket Girls (Professor Miyamoto)
- Serial Experiments Lain (Narrator)
- Supernatural: The Anime Series (Bobby Singer)
- Tales of the Abyss (King Ingobert the Sixth)
- Ulysses 31 (Yumaiosu) (Original Nagoya TV Version)
- YuYu Hakusho (Shigure)

=== Live-action shows ===
- Chouseishin Gransazer (Belzeus)

=== Video games ===
- Front Mission 5: Scars of the War (Hector Reynolds)
- One Piece Grand Battle! 3 (Montblanc Cricket)
- Riven (Gehn)
- Super Robot Wars (Dog Tack)
- Star Wars Rogue Squadron II: Rogue Leader (Crix Madine)
- Star Wars Rogue Squadron III: Rebel Strike (Crix Madine)
- Xenoblade Chronicles (Arglas) (Zanza)

=== Dubbing ===
==== Live action ====
- Tom Berenger
  - D-Tox (Hank)
  - Inception (2012 TV Asahi edition) (Peter Browning)
  - Platoon (1998 DVD edition) (Bob Barnes)
  - Sniper (Thomas Beckett)
- 2 Fast 2 Furious (2006 TV Asahi edition) (Agent Markham (James Remar))
- Adaptation (John Laroche (Chris Cooper))
- The Adventures of Buckaroo Banzai Across the 8th Dimension (Dr. Sidney Zweibel (Jeff Goldblum))
- The Affair of the Necklace (Cardinal Louis de Rohan (Jonathan Pryce))
- Back to the Future (Video and DVD editions) (Biff Tannen (Thomas F. Wilson))
- Back to the Future Part II (Video and DVD editions) (Biff Tannen, Griff Tannen (Thomas F. Wilson))
- Back to the Future Part III (Video and DVD editions) (Buford "Mad Dog" Tannen, Biff Tannen (Thomas F. Wilson))
- Back to the Future: The Ride (Biff Tannen (Thomas F. Wilson))
- Bad Boys II (2006 TV Asahi edition) (Alexei (Peter Stormare))
- Bandidas (Bill Buck (Sam Shepard))
- Best in Show (Harlan Pepper (Christopher Guest))
- Billy Bathgate (Dutch Schultz (Dustin Hoffman))
- Blade Runner: The Final Cut (Roy Batty (Rutger Hauer))
- Blade: Trinity (Drake (Dominic Purcell))
- Captain America: The First Avenger (Chester Phillips (Tommy Lee Jones))
- The Cat in the Hat (Lawrence Quinn (Alec Baldwin))
- Cellular (2007 TV Asahi edition) (Ethan Greer (Jason Statham))
- Chapter 27 (John Lennon (Mark Lindsay Chapman))
- Child's Play 2 (Mattson (Greg Germann))
- Cliffhanger (1997 NTV edition) (Richard Travers (Rex Linn))
- Coming to America (DVD edition) (Prince Akeem Joffer, Clarence, Randy Watson, Saul (Sweets) (Eddie Murphy))
- Cronos (Jesús Gris (Federico Luppi))
- The Deaths of Ian Stone (Gray (Michael Feast))
- The Delta Force (Pete Peterson)
- Demon Knight (Frank Brayker (William Sadler))
- Die Hard (TV Asahi edition) (Agent Johnson)
- Eight Below (Dr. Davis McClaren (Bruce Greenwood))
- Elizabeth (Thomas Howard (Christopher Eccleston))
- Enter the Dragon (Lee (Bruce Lee))
- ER (Dr. Greg Fischer (Harry Lennix))
- Falling Skies (season 1–2) (Dan Weaver (Will Patton))
- Firewall (2009 TV Asahi edition) (Gary Mitchell (Robert Patrick))
- From the Earth to the Moon (Frank Borman (David Andrews))
- Glory (Corporal Thomas Searles (Andre Braugher))
- The Godfather (DVD/Blu-Ray edition) (Sonny Corleone (James Caan))
- The Godfather Part II (DVD/Blu-Ray edition) (Sonny Corleone (James Caan))
- Gone in 60 Seconds (Atley Jackson (Will Patton))
- Gothika (Dr. Douglas Grey (Charles S. Dutton))
- The Grudge (Matt Williams (William Mapother))
- Hellboy (Hellboy (Ron Perlman))
- Hellboy II: The Golden Army (Hellboy (Ron Perlman))
- I Love Trouble (Peter Brackett (Nick Nolte))
- Intersection (Vincent Eastman (Richard Gere))
- Irréversible (Le Tenia (Jo Prestia))
- Jaws (DVD edition) (Martin Brody (Roy Scheider))
- Licence to Kill (In-flight broadcasting edition) (James Bond (Timothy Dalton))
- Marked for Death (1995 TV Asahi edition) (Charles Marks (Tom Wright))
- Max Headroom (Edison Carter (Matt Frewer))
- Men in Black 3 (Agent K (Tommy Lee Jones/Josh Brolin))
- Mercury Rising (DVD edition) (Special Agent Art Jeffries (Bruce Willis))
- Missing in Action 2: The Beginning (Captain David Nester (Steven Williams))
- No Country for Old Men (Llewelyn Moss (Josh Brolin))
- O Brother, Where Art Thou? (Big Dan Teague (John Goodman))
- Parenthood (Larry Buckman (Tom Hulce))
- Patriot Games (Robby Jackson (Samuel L. Jackson))
- Platoon (1989 TV Asahi edition) (King (Keith David))
- Police Story (Inspector Man)
- Practical Magic (Investigator Gary Hallet (Aidan Quinn))
- The Recruit (Walter Burke (Al Pacino))
- Renaissance Man (Sergeant Cass (Gregory Hines))
- Revolver (Dorothy Macha (Ray Liotta))
- RoboCop 3 (Alex Murphy / RoboCop (Robert John Burke))
- Scarface (1991 TV Tokyo edition) (Manolo "Manny Ray" Ribera (Steven Bauer))
- Screamers (Lieutenant Commander Chuck Elbarak (Ron White))
- Secret Sunshine (Park Do-seop (Jo Yeong-jin))
- Space Race (Narrator)
- Star Trek: Enterprise (Jonathan Archer (Scott Bakula))
- Stranger Than Fiction (Professor Jules Hilbert (Dustin Hoffman))
- Supernatural (Bobby Singer (Jim Beaver))
- Terminal Velocity (Kerr (Christopher McDonald))
- Tomorrow Never Dies (Elliot Carver (Jonathan Pryce))
- Top Gun (1989 Fuji TV edition) (LT Tom "Iceman" Kazansky (Val Kilmer))
- The Towering Inferno (1989 TBS edition) (Dan Bigelow (Robert Wagner))
- Viper (Julian Wilkes (Dorian Harewood))
- Walker, Texas Ranger (Cordell Walker (Chuck Norris))
- Willy Wonka & the Chocolate Factory (2009 DVD edition) (Bill (Aubrey Woods))
- You Only Live Twice (DVD edition) (Tiger Tanaka (Tetsurō Tamba))

==== Animation ====
- Meet the Robinsons (Uncle Art)
- Robbie the Reindeer (Blitzen)
- Toy Story (Sarge)
- Toy Story 2 (Sarge)

=== CD ===
- Maps Santora CD (Karion)
- Street Fighter Zero Gaiden ~Shunrei Tabidachi no Shō~ (Gouken)
