= Carry On (Supernatural) =

- Supernatural episode
- Episode no.: Season 15; Episode 20
- Directed by: Robert Singer
- Written by: Andrew Dabb
- Cinematography by: Serge Ladouceur
- Editing by: James Pickel
- Production code: T13.21770
- Original air date: November 19, 2020

Guest appearance
- Jim Beaver as Bobby Singer (special guest star)

Episode chronology
← Previous "Inherit the Earth"	Next → —
- Supernatural season 15

"Carry On" is the series finale of the American television series Supernatural. It serves as the 20th episode of the fifteenth season, and the 327th overall. The episode was originally broadcast on The CW on November 19, 2020, and was written by showrunner and executive producer Andrew Dabb and directed by co-showrunner and executive producer Robert Singer. The show stars Jared Padalecki and Jensen Ackles as Sam and Dean Winchester, two brothers who hunt demons, ghosts, monsters, and other supernatural beings. The episode shows Sam and Dean six months after the events of the previous episode, as they begin their final hunt together which ends in tragedy.

In January 2019, the CW renewed the series for a fifteenth season. In March, various cast members revealed that the new season of the show would be its last, with the series finale scheduled to air on May 18, 2020. However, production was shut down due to the COVID-19 pandemic with two episodes left to film, which resumed in August, and concluded in September 2020. The finale, which was rescheduled to air on November 19, 2020, was preceded by a special titled The Long Road Home. In its initial broadcast, "Carry On" received positive reviews from critics, who deemed the episode a satisfactory conclusion to the series.

== Plot ==
Six months after the events of the previous episode, Sam (Jared Padalecki) and Dean Winchester (Jensen Ackles) resume their regular lives hunting monsters. Sam is still expressing sadness with his allies Castiel (Misha Collins) and Jack Kline (Alexander Calvert) gone but Dean reassures him that they now have a chance to live a "more normal life".

In Akron, Ohio, intruders break into a family's house. The father is killed with his body drained of blood, the mother has her tongue removed and the children are kidnapped. Sam and Dean investigate and use their father's journal to identify the intruders as vampires he had hunted in 1986, predicting that their next target is Canton, Ohio. Following them, they kill one of the intruders and force the other to reveal the location of the children, who are at a barn. Once there, Sam and Dean free the children but they fight the vampires, with Sam being knocked out.

One of the vampires is Jenny (Christine Chatelain), a woman that they had failed to save from being turned into a vampire 15 years prior. Sam wakes up and they kill the vampires but Dean is impaled in the back by a spike. Sam intends to leave to find medical supplies but Dean has him stay, as his wound appears to be fatal. Dean reassures him that this was always how it was going to end for him and thanks Sam for everything, telling him he loves him and is proud of him. After saying goodbye, Dean dies in Sam's arms. The next day, Sam burns Dean's body in a funeral pyre.

Dean finds himself in Heaven and reunites with Bobby Singer (Jim Beaver) outside of the Roadhouse bar. Bobby reveals that after becoming God, Jack and Castiel reshaped Heaven to give everyone anything they wanted and tore down all of the walls keeping the souls separated from each other. After being told that his friend Rufus Turner (Steven Williams), and his parents John Winchester (Jeffrey Dean Morgan) and Mary Winchester (Samantha Smith) live in the surrounding area, Dean takes the Chevrolet Impala for a ride through Heaven as "Carry On Wayward Son" plays on the radio.

Sam continues with his life, getting married and having a child, whom he names after Dean. As he grows older and his health deteriorates, he is visited by his son, who is shown to have become a hunter as well, before Sam peacefully dies of natural causes. He then reunites with Dean in Heaven, on a version of the bridge first seen in the pilot episode.

== Production ==
In January 2019, The CW renewed Supernatural for a fifteenth season. In March 2019, cast members Jared Padalecki, Jensen Ackles, and Misha Collins confirmed that the fifteenth season would be the last. Series creator Eric Kripke commented that "In a show about family, it is amazing, and it is the pride of his life, that it became family. So thank you guys for that." With 15 seasons and 327 episodes, the show holds the title as the longest-running show in The CW's history.

The series finale was originally set to air on May 18, 2020. However, in March 2020, Warner Bros. Television shut down production on the series due to the COVID-19 pandemic with two episodes, including the finale, left to go. Showrunner and executive producer Andrew Dabb revealed that the season would go on hiatus after episode 13 of the season, broadcast on March 23. Dabb clarified that the series had completed production on 18 of the 20 episodes for the season, but the post-production process could not be completed on the episodes because of the shutdown in production. Dabb also assured that the series' cast and crew, The CW, and Warner Bros. were fully committed to filming and airing the unproduced episodes with its proper finale.

In August 2020, The CW announced that the season would resume airing on October 8, 2020, and that the series finale would air on November 19, which was preceded by a special titled The Long Road Home. Filming for the last two episodes began in Vancouver on August 18 and concluded on September 10.

According to an interview with Entertainment Weekly, the original plans for the episode's final moments would have had Dean going to Heaven and finding a party being held in a version of the Roadhouse Bar. In attendance would have been various characters from throughout the series along with Kansas themselves performing "Carry On Wayward Son". The COVID-19 pandemic forced the production to scrap these plans and rewrite the ending.

== Reception ==
=== Viewers ===
The episode received 1.4 million viewers and was the most-watched Supernatural episode since April 2019.

=== Critical reception ===
"Carry On" received mainly positive reviews. Emily Tannenbaum of IGN gave the episode an "amazing" 9 out of 10 and wrote in her verdict that "the Supernatural series finale took its time, gracefully balancing reference and nostalgia with a hunt and endgame worthy of its legacy." Alex McLevy of The A.V. Club gave the episode a B+ and praised the episode for its story, conclusion of major character arcs, and its ending that gave him an "emotional gut punch" and ended the series as "a damn good one." While Saim Cheeda of Screen Rant lauded the episode for focusing on the Winchesters, Maryann Sleasman of TV Guide wrote, "I may not be thrilled by where we ended up, but the trip has been incredible."
