= Bobby Singer =

Fictional character in the TV series Supernatural

- Supernatural / The Winchesters character
- Jim Beaver as Bobby Singer
- First appearance: "Devil's Trap"; Supernatural; May 4, 2006
- Last appearance: "Hey, That's No Way to Say Goodbye"; The Winchesters; March 7, 2023
- Created by: Eric Kripke
- Based on: Robert Singer (namesake)
- Portrayed by: Jim Beaver
- Voiced by: Takashi Taniguchi (anime, Japanese dub); Harry Standjofski (anime, English dub)

In-universe information
- Nickname: Bobby
- Gender: Male
- Occupation: Salvager; Hunter
- Family: Ed Singer (father); Mrs. Singer (mother)
- Spouse: Karen Singer
- Children: No biological children; Sam Winchester (adopted son); Dean Winchester (adopted son)
- Nationality: American

Robert Steven Singer is a fictional character in The CW Television Network's horror-drama television series Supernatural portrayed by Jim Beaver. Named after the show's executive producer, Bobby first appears in the first season finale "Devil's Trap." Although Beaver believed his role would merely be a "one-shot deal," Bobby has become a recurring character on the series, and is one of three characters who has appeared in every season of the show. The character, a "rough but warmhearted" working-class man who hunts supernatural creatures, has evolved over time into a father figure for series protagonists Sam and Dean Winchester. Critics have responded favorably to the character.

Starting in the season 12 finale "All Along the Watchtower" and carrying over into season 13, an alternate reality version of Bobby is introduced. This Bobby is portrayed as the leader of some of the surviving human population in a post-Apocalyptic world though sharing many of the same traits as his counterpart. This Bobby continues to appear throughout seasons 14 and 15.

In the series finale, the original Bobby returns for a brief cameo appearance after having been missing from the show since the eleventh season.

In The Winchesters, Bobby makes a cameo appearance in the first season finale alongside Dean and Jack.

== Fictional biography ==
Salvager and proprietor of Singer Salvage Yard, Bobby Singer was first introduced to the supernatural world when his wife, Karen, became possessed by a demon. As detailed in the third-season episode "Dream a Little Dream of Me", he was uncertain of how to save her, and instead ended up being forced to kill her. Her death prompted him to dedicate his life to hunting supernatural creatures. The later episode "Death's Door" expanded on this by revealing that Bobby's last conversation with his wife was an argument about his reluctance to have children, also revealing that his father was an abusive man whom Bobby shot when he was a child (his mother subsequently telling him that God would punish him for this). Bobby reflected that his father's example left him afraid of becoming an abusive man himself in case he became a parent as bad as his father.

After the death of Mary Winchester, her husband John became a hunter, eventually allying and learning from Bobby. Mistrustful of most hunters, Bobby is one of the few with whom he allows the boys regular contact, allowing Bobby to teach them how to shoot and track while he is off on 'hunting trips'. At times, Bobby defied John's wishes to teach the boys more mundane, normal activities, such as playing catch, so that they could have a break from the intensive training regimen. While John eventually distanced himself from other hunters or fell out of contact with them, notably Ellen Harvelle and Daniel Elkins, he maintained a professional relationship with Bobby.

Bobby makes his debut in the first season finale "Devil's Trap", and is revealed to be an old friend of the Winchester family. Sam and Dean seek his help when John is kidnapped by demons. From his extensive collection of supernatural-related literature and resources, Bobby shows the brothers how to create a devil's trap—mystical symbols capable of rendering a demon powerless—and later assists in the exorcism of the demon possessed Meg Masters. After John's death in the second-season premiere, Bobby allows the brothers to stay at his home to rest up and rebuild the recently crippled Impala. He continues to assist them when they require additional expertise in their hunts, rescuing a demonically-possessed Sam and dealing with a Trickster. In the second-season finale, Bobby helps Dean to locate a missing Sam, but they both watch in horror as he is fatally stabbed in the back. Bobby begs Dean to bury Sam, and is distraught when he learns that Dean has sold his soul to a demon for Sam's resurrection. When the hunters learn of the demon Azazel's plan to open a Devil's Gate—a gateway to Hell—they rush to stop him. The gateway is temporarily opened, releasing hundreds of other demons into the world, before Bobby and Ellen Harvelle close it again.

Bobby assists the Winchesters throughout the third season in their war against the recently escaped demons, starting with helping them defeat the Seven Deadly Sins in the premiere, as well as repairing The Colt so they can make new bullets for it with the help of the demon Ruby in the episode "Sin City". The Winchesters save Bobby's life when he is put into a coma by a teenager using dreamroot to enter the minds of others, but this results in Bela Talbot—a thief who takes supernatural artifacts that the brothers called for help finding the dreamroot—stealing the Colt while they are unconscious. Bobby helps them track down Lilith—a powerful demon who holds the contract to Dean's deal—the night before his contract runs out. However, they are unable to stop her, and Dean is sent to Hell.

When Dean mysteriously returns to life four months later in the fourth season premiere "Lazarus Rising", Bobby at first believes him to be a demon or some other type of supernatural creature. After first attempting to kill Dean and then putting him through numerous tests, Bobby helps him to reunite with his brother. While Sam later sneaks away to secretly hone his new-found demonic abilities, Bobby and Dean perform a ritual to summon whatever creature resurrected him. The being, revealed to be the angel Castiel, incapacitates Bobby before informing Dean that he was saved from Hell because Heaven has work for him to do. The subsequent episode, "Are You There, God? It's Me, Dean Winchester", reveals that Dean must stop Lilith from breaking the 66 mystical seals keeping Lucifer imprisoned.

In "The Rapture", Dean discovers that Sam's abilities have been amplified due to a recent addiction to demon blood; he has Bobby lock Sam inside his ghost- and demon-proof panic room—located in Bobby's basement—to recover from his dependence on demon blood. Sam escapes in the subsequent episode, and, faced with the choice of either shooting him or letting him go, Bobby chooses the latter. In the fourth season finale, "Lucifer Rising", Dean is furious that Sam has chosen to side with Ruby—who has been feeding Sam her blood to make him strong enough to kill Lilith—over him. Despite Dean's declaration that if Sam should leave, he should never come back, Sam chooses to go with Ruby. When Bobby learns of the ultimatum, he compares Dean's actions to those of John Winchester—years prior, John made a similar statement to Sam, which prompted him to abandon hunting and alienated him from his family. Although Bobby's words eventually convince Dean to try to reach out to Sam, he is prevented by the angels; they want to start the Apocalypse to bring paradise to the world when Lucifer is defeated, and the death of Lilith is the final seal holding the fallen angel in place. Not knowing this, Sam kills her, thus unleashing Lucifer. Bobby meets up with the brothers in the fifth season premiere "Sympathy for the Devil", to help them research ways to defeat Lucifer. When Sam confesses that he broke the final seal, an angry Bobby tells him to "lose [his] number" when the Apocalypse is over. After Dean comes across a lead on the sword's location, Bobby attacks him and is revealed to be demonically possessed. However, Bobby temporarily retakes control, and stabs himself with Ruby's demon-killing knife. Although the demon dies, Bobby survives, but is left paraplegic by his injury. At the end of the episode, he tells Sam that his earlier comments were made by the demon, and that he could never cut Sam out of his life.

With Castiel's now-weakened powers leaving him unable to heal injuries, being in a wheelchair begins to take its toll on Bobby. When the brothers come across a poker-playing witch in "The Curious Case of Dean Winchester", he sees it as a chance to regain his mobility and wagers 25 years of his lifespan. Although he loses and begins to age rapidly, Sam and Dean manage to restore his lost years. In "Dead Men Don't Wear Plaid", Bobby's wife suddenly rises from her grave and appears to be completely normal, along with numerous other people buried at the local cemetery, all to their respective houses. Sam and Dean try to convince him to kill her because she is a zombie, but he refuses and orders them to leave. Over time, the other zombies begin to turn evil, and Bobby is forced to kill his wife again to prevent her from changing, too. After all the zombies are dealt with, Bobby reveals that Death orchestrated the situation; because he is one of the reasons why Sam has not yet agreed to be Lucifer's vessel, the Horseman attempted to break Bobby's spirit. Although Dean tries to comfort him by pointing out that he got to see his wife again, Bobby notes that it only made her death a thousand times worse.

The brothers eventually learn that the rings of the Four Horsemen can be used to re imprison Lucifer, and they manage to collect three by the episode "Two Minutes To Midnight". Still in need of Death's ring, Bobby sells his soul to Crowley—a powerful demon who also wants to stop Lucifer—in exchange for the knowledge of the final Horseman's location. Crowley promises to return his soul When the Apocalypse has been prevented, keeping it in the meantime to guarantee his safety from the Winchesters. When the deal has been made, the demon reveals that he added in a secret clause to restore Bobby's mobility. An ecstatic Bobby then joins Sam and Castiel on a mission to stop nation-wide distribution of the Croatoan virus. In the fifth season finale, Sam decides to consent to Lucifer, hoping that he can maintain control long enough to throw himself into Lucifer's prison. However, the fallen angel instantly overwhelms his new vessel, and teleports away with the rings. Bobby and Castiel lose faith in their goal, but Dean convinces them to keep fighting. They learn the location of the destined battleground from the prophet Chuck, and arrive just as Lucifer and Michael prepare to fight. An angry Lucifer kills Bobby and Castiel when they interfere, and then sets his sight onto Dean. Sam is able to reassert control over his body, and uses the rings to imprison himself and Michael. With the Apocalypse over, God resurrects Castiel, who in turn brings Bobby back to life.

The sixth season episode "Weekend At Bobby's" is centered on Bobby; Sam and Dean are largely relegated to a side-plot while the episode focuses on Bobby's constant working to cover other hunters while also trying to reclaim his soul from Crowley. After a year's research into Crowley's human life—including summoning the ghost of Crowley's mortal son for intel—Bobby locates Crowley's physical remains. Bobby is the first human to reverse a demon-deal by threatening to destroy Crowley's remains which would 'kill' Crowley in the same manner as exorcising a ghost; he also presses his advantage to force Crowley into leaving him the use of his legs and the removal of any loopholes from the original contract.

Sam, concerned by reports that the psychological damage his soul will have sustained while being tortured by Lucifer will destroy him if it is restored to his body, attempts to kill Bobby in "Appointment in Samarra" as part of a ritual to prevent his soul returning to him. After Sam's soul is restored, Bobby easily forgives Sam as he recognizes that Sam was not responsible; though, he is awkward around him at first due to his actions. Bobby then collaborates with the Winchesters in tracking down Eve, the mother of all monsters, when she is released from Purgatory by a ritual performed by dragons, even after their first attempt results in Bobby being possessed by a brain-controlling slug Eve has created, as well as in the death of his old friend and mentor, Rufus, in "And Then There Were None".

During a temporary change in the timeline caused by angel Balthazar saving the Titanic, Bobby is married to a still-living Ellen in "My Heart Will Go On", but this timeline is undone with only Sam, Dean, and the angels remembering it.

After a time-travel mission results in the brothers and Bobby acquiring the phoenix ash needed to kill Eve, they eliminate her in "Mommy Dearest". They also realize that Castiel has been deceiving them and in "The Man Who Would Be King" deduce that he has collaborating with Crowley to open Purgatory in an attempt to acquire the power of the souls within it to use in the civil war in Heaven. Despite their best efforts, Dean, Sam and Bobby fail to stop Castiel, who uses the Purgatory souls to elevate himself to a god-like level in the sixth season finale.

Although he initially helps the Winchesters in Season 7 in their struggle against the Leviathans—God's original creations, trapped for millennia in Purgatory until they were unintentionally released by Castiel—despite the destruction of his house, even determining their new foes' vulnerability to the chemical Borax, Bobby is eventually shot in the head by Dick Roman in "How to Win Friends and Influence Monsters". He spends the next episode, "Death's Door", in a coma, trying to reawaken to reveal the Leviathan's plot. Despite efforts to save him, Bobby flatlines from his injuries; his last word being "idjits" (sic, idiots) to Sam and Dean after passing on a sequence of numbers. The episode ends with a reaper asking Bobby if he is going to become a ghost or move on to the afterlife. It's indicated that he stayed as a ghost to help the boys as there have been times since his death when the information they need inexplicably makes itself known to them, but they were initially unable to confirm or deny Bobby's possible presence. During "Party On, Garth," Sam reveals that he tried to use a talking board to contact him if he is still around, but received no response. However, Garth registers high readings on an EMF detector around Bobby's old flask, and when Dean needed a sword to slay a shojo, it inexplicably slid across the ground to him, leading him to believe that Bobby had helped him. At the end of the episode, Bobby's spirit can be seen in the brother's motel room, and he is annoyed when Dean comes in, looks right at him, and does not see him, instead grabbing his flask.

In "Of Grave Importance", the audience is fully aware of Bobby's ghostly existence and the episode revolves around his own parallel investigation with the Winchesters of a haunted house. When Annie Hawkins, a hunter friend of the three, calls for assistance before being killed by the house's ghost, Bobby follows the Winchesters via the flask and discovers Annie dead with a myriad of other ghosts unable to move on from their place of death. Determined to get out information, Bobby learns to manipulate physical objects and points Dean and Sam in the right direction, and they are able to destroy the ghost haunting the house before the ghost could destroy Bobby. At the end of the episode, having accepted Bobby's return, Bobby is now fully visible to the Winchesters and explains to them how he chose to remain behind; a choice Dean finds hard to accept.

Following their reunion, Bobby explains Dick Roman's endgame for humanity; cure humanity of all its diseases before herding them as livestock for the Leviathans to feed on. In the midst of his explanation, the brothers receive an email from a dead Frank Devereaux, who informs them that his hard drive, in Roman's possession at his headquarters, is currently being cybernetically attacked and will lead to their new aliases and safe houses being compromised. While Bobby attempts to convince the Winchesters to send in his flask, the brothers are concerned his hatred for Roman will compromise the operation and leave him out. The hacker responsible of cracking Devereaux's hard drive, Charlene Bradbury, witnesses a Leviathan eating and cloning her boss and is quickly able to be recruited to help the brothers against the Leviathans. While the operation is successful—wiping the hard drive, hacking Roman's email account and intercepting an important package—Charlene is unable to escape the building in time. Bobby, having snuck his flask into her bag, cracks the doors and begins to attack the Leviathans, breaking Charlene's arm in the process, leading to a concerned discussion between the brothers as to Bobby's self-control. Bobby later returns after having to recharge for a while and describes himself as "stronger than ever." Bobby becomes increasingly frustrated in "There Will Be Blood", which only feeds his fast-growing rage and turns him more into a vengeful spirit, culminating in his possession of a maid, whom he uses to go seek vengeance on Dick. In the seventh season finale, "Survival of the Fittest," Sam tries to stop him, but Bobby is no longer completely in control of himself and nearly strangles Sam to death. Realizing what he is doing, he regains control and leaves the maid's body. Now knowing the danger of him losing control again, Bobby requests that Sam and Dean burn his flask. They reluctantly do so, causing his ghost to disappear.

Bobby next appears in eighth season episode "Taxi Driver," in which Sam and Dean learn from rogue Reaper Ajay that instead of going to Heaven when his flask was burned, Bobby was taken to Hell on Crowley's orders. Needing to rescue an innocent soul and release it into Heaven to complete the second trial to close the Gates of Hell, Sam travels into Hell and finds Bobby who initially believes he is a demon as he is being tormented by demons pretending to be Sam and Dean all the time, but Sam convinces him with personal information only he and Dean know. The two escape into Purgatory, but find that Ajay the Reaper is missing (having been questioned and killed by Crowley). With the help of Dean's vampiric friend Benny, Sam returns to Earth with Bobby's soul, but when Bobby goes to ascend to Heaven, he is trapped by Crowley, who wants to take him back to Hell to punish him for the "damage" he has done to demons in his hunting career. However, the angel Naomi intervenes, drives Crowley off, and allows Bobby to ascend to his rightful place in Heaven, thus completing the second trial.

When Sam is in a coma and dying in the ninth season premiere "I Think I'm Gonna Like It Here", his subconscious desire to give up and die manifests in the form of Bobby. "Bobby" takes Sam away from the Impala and talks to him about moving on being a good thing and something he should do before taking him to a house in the woods where he says what Sam needs is. The part of Sam's mind that wants to live promptly manifests as Dean and kills "Bobby" to try to convince Sam one last time to live, but Sam decides to go with "Bobby's" advice.

During the tenth season episode "Inside Man", Bobby is relaxing in Heaven when Sam and Castiel contact him through a séance to help break Metatron out of Heaven's prison. Though he feels himself to be rusty, Bobby agrees and escapes his Heaven, releasing all the other Bobby Singers to create a distraction. Bobby gets Castiel into Heaven and helps him free Metatron before returning to his own Heaven. He leaves a note with Castiel for Sam, telling him not to stop searching for a cure for the Mark of Cain but to stop lying to Dean about it. He also states that helping again was the most fun he had in Heaven and he will accept any punishment for his actions. After returning to his Heaven, Bobby looks at a picture of him, Sam and Dean at his old salvage yard as Hannah and a few other angels come after him for punishment. As revealed in the series finale, Bobby was locked up in Heaven's dungeon for his actions.

In season eleven's "Safe House", Sam and Dean investigate a house where Bobby and Rufus had worked a case in around 2008 or 2009 while the Winchesters were hunting Lilith to stop the Apocalypse. During the case, the two men faced off with a monster that was causing people to drop into mysterious comas and die while acting like a ghost. Bobby eventually recognized the monster as a Soul Eater, a monster that steals people's souls and takes them to its nest in a pocket dimension. Bobby had faced and trapped a Soul Eater before and he and Rufus are able to trap the one in the house they are investigating. However, Bobby briefly falls victim to the monster and is transported to its nest while his body is possessed by the monster to attack Rufus who is able to complete the trap. In the present, the trap is accidentally broken during renovations of the house and the Winchesters face the Soul Eater themselves. The Winchesters are able to kill the Soul Eater, but Dean's soul is also taken to the nest, a place outside of time and space. Moments before the souls are released from the nest by the Soul Eater's death, Dean and Bobby briefly see each other and are left wondering if the experience was real in their respective time periods. After killing the Soul Eater Bobby and Rufus had faced, the Winchesters return to the house Bobby had previously trapped a Soul Eater in and slay that monster as well to finish Bobby's old case for him.

In the series finale, after dying for the final time, Dean reunites with the Bobby of his world in Heaven outside of the Roadhouse. Bobby reveals that Jack sprung him from Heaven's jail and reshaped Heaven to be a much better place with Castiel's help where everyone is no longer separated but are now able to exist together. Bobby tells Dean about Rufus and his parents and reassures Dean that he and Sam will be reunited in time. Dean then drives off through Heaven in the Impala, leaving Bobby sitting outside of the Roadhouse.

In The Winchesters, Bobby is revealed to be working with Dean to hunt the Akrida, a threat to all of existence that Dean discovered while detouring through the Multiverse on his way through Heaven. After the Akrida are defeated, Bobby reappears with Jack and backs Dean up on his direct interference in the situation before Jack returns them to their own world.

=== Apocalypse World ===
In the season twelve finale "All Along the Watchtower", a rift between the Winchesters' universe and a post-apocalyptic world that comes to be called Apocalypse World is opened by the impending birth of Lucifer's Nephilim son Jack. After crossing into this reality, Castiel is saved from a demon by an alternate reality version of Bobby Singer who is shown to hunt both angels and demons using weapons made out of re-forged angel blades. Castiel later returns to Apocalypse World with the Winchesters who are stunned to see Bobby. Bobby explains the history of Apocalypse World to the Winchesters and provides Dean with a machine gun loaded with angel-killing bullets to fight Lucifer with. Its later revealed that Bobby was invited to return with them, but refused as he knew he was needed on his own world.

In season thirteen's "Good Intentions", Mary Winchester and the Nephilim Jack encounter the alternate reality Bobby after escaping from the custody of the archangel Michael. Bobby is stunned to meet Mary as he knew her dead counterpart, but takes the two in. Bobby is revealed to be the leader of one of the last human colonies on Earth, protecting it from the angels' war of genocide. Showing many similarities to the Bobby Sam and Dean knew, Bobby reminisces with Mary about her counterpart, inadvertently revealing in the process that a differing decision made by the alternate Mary led to the creation of Apocalypse World. While discussing his meeting with the Winchesters, Bobby shows the same kind of fondness for them that his counterpart had and expresses a belief that while the Winchesters' world has them to defend it, Apocalypse World only has Bobby. Bobby is enraged by the revelation that Jack is a Nephilim and chooses to exile him from the colony. However, angels led by Zachariah attack and Bobby refuses Jack's help. Bobby witnesses Jack kill Zachariah and three other angels, saving the colony despite Bobby's rejection of him. Jack's help gains him Bobby's acceptance and Jack decides that to save Bobby and the surviving humans on Apocalypse World, he must kill Michael, a decision that stuns Bobby.

Eventually, Bobby and other human survivors of Apocalypse World choose to accompany the Winchesters back to their world, where they settle into the bunker and start to build new lives for themselves. Bobby also starts to form a relationship with Mary, revealing in the process that, unlike 'our' Bobby, he and his wife had a child, but after his wife's death, Bobby was separated from his son Daniel after the Apocalypse began, with Daniel's death at the hands of angels leaving Bobby ever more focused on hunting.

== Characterization ==
Actor Jim Beaver described Bobby as a "rough but warmhearted" working-class man with the outlook that "sometimes there are things that need to be done and they're not fun to do, but they gotta be done anyway." When the "usually level-headed" hunter must use a wheelchair in the fifth season, he becomes "frustrated and angry"; instead of being able to join the battles, he is "stuck at home manning the telephones." This feeling of uselessness eventually leads to thoughts of suicide, though he deems himself too much of a coward to go through with it. On the situation, Beaver commented, "Bobby lives in a world where all kinds of strange things are possible. Somewhere along the line, he has a hope that one of these strange, miraculous things might happen to him. I think he is also a realist. He understands that even when you have friends that come back from the dead, not everything that you want to happen is going to happen."

There are fundamental differences between him and John, and as much as the boys clearly love their father in some ways they're more comfortable with Bobby. But everybody has parent baggage, and sometimes your favorite uncle is a more fun parent figure than your real parents. I've always felt that it's a cross between a father figure and an uncle...

— Beaver discussing the dynamics of Bobby's relationship with the Winchesters

Though Bobby is "fairly content, at least on the surface, to be alone in the world," he slowly comes to be a surrogate father for Sam and Dean. On this relationship, Beaver feels that "Bobby's concerned about them both, with Dean's sense of self, but there's a sort of undercurrent of worry about Sam. Sam seems to have more of the heart of darkness about him than Dean does... I just sense that there's this ongoing watchful eye that Bobby's got on Sam." Although he loves each of them "like a son," Bobby is willing to allow the brothers to put themselves in harm's way if it is absolutely necessary. For example, when Dean wants to detoxify Sam from his addiction to demon blood in "When the Levee Breaks," Bobby instead points out that Sam giving in to his demonic abilities could help him to prevent Lucifer's return, even though the amount of blood required to kill Lilith would "change [him] forever." Beaver noted, "Bobby is old enough that he's fairly clear-headed about what the priorities ought to be. Bobby's position is, more or less, 'if you have a family member with a drinking problem and you want to stage an intervention, you might not want to do it in New Orleans during Hurricane Katrina.'"

== Development ==
Beaver had previously worked with executive producer Robert Singer on the television series Reasonable Doubts, and Singer gave him the part without viewing his audition tape. The character is named after Singer, though how this came to be is uncertain. Singer himself claimed Kripke secretly slipped the name into the script for "Devil's Trap"; contradicting this was Beaver, who claimed that the surname was not in the script but was rather jokingly added onto a salvage-yard sign—"Singer Auto Parts"—by the set designers. The actor thought his initial appearance would be a "one-shot deal," and was surprised when he was asked to return. Beaver feels that his longevity on the show is due to his chemistry with Ackles and Padalecki.

The first episode to delve into Bobby's backstory was the third season's "Dream a Little Dream of Me." Because the writers always knew his history would be "grounded in family," the episode's teaser initially depicted the supernatural deaths of his children. However, the writers could not determine where to go from there. Following writer Cathryn Humphris' earlier pitch of Bobby being an expert exorcist because of a previous failed exorcism, the focus changed to Bobby's torment about killing his demonically-possessed wife.

...it's sometimes hard to sit in the chair and fully commit to the unpleasant aspects of it. Wheelchairs weren't invented for people to have fun with, and I try to keep that in mind. As an actor, it's very intriguing. Anything you get to do that's different from your own life is interesting. But I don't take it lightly.

— Beaver discussing the influence of the wheelchair

During production of the fourth season, Beaver joined the limited series Harper's Island. Although he initially feared that it would prevent future appearances of Bobby, he was able to maintain his Supernatural "quota" with seven episodes. The character's role increased for the fifth season, which made sense for the actor due to the apocalyptic storyline. The season also introduced a new story arc for Bobby: his use of a wheelchair. Series creator Eric Kripke explained that it "[made] the Apocalypse matter"; the writers wanted "real stakes and real loss and real obstacles thrown in our heroes' way" to differentiate it from prior seasons. Though he found it to be a challenge, Beaver enjoyed the experience because he could perform tricks on set that his wheelchair-using college roommate had taught him. However, the actor did "[take it] very seriously," and commented, "I can get out of the chair at the end of the day and go home and I recognize that, so many people can't and I have to be considerate to them and respect that."

== Reception ==
The character's portrayal has received wide acclaim from critics. John Kubicek of BuddyTV ranked Beaver fourteenth on his list of the best supporting actors in a drama series from the 2009-2010 TV season, believing that the actor "did his best acting work ever" as Bobby. Likewise, Karla Peterson of The San Diego Union-Tribune suggested, "May his trucker cap get its own star on the Hollywood Walk of Fame."

Tina Charles of TV Guide feels that Bobby "totally rocks," and "wouldn't mind him in every [episode]. OK, every other one." She pointed out Beaver's chemistry with Ackles, and wrote, "I have always loved any scene we get that involves [Bobby and Dean]—they're unexpectedly emotional. When Bobby finally realized he wasn't talking to a Dean shapeshifter or revenant [in 'Lazarus Rising'], that this was the real deal, it was just awesome." Charles was surprised by Bobby's paralysis storyline, but became "really interested" in finding out how it would affect him. However, she posited, "The guy's a spitfire...and it probably won't change him much." IGN's Diana Steenbergen also praised Beaver, calling Bobby "a valuable member of the team" that "broadens [the Winchesters'] tight-knit unit, reminding them that there is more to family than just blood ties". She found the actor to be "fantastic as the broken Bobby" in the fifth season, "despondent over his situation and feeling useless". Steenbergen noted, "Bobby has been through a lot this season, and Jim Beaver has done an outstanding job portraying his journey. Not solely a surrogate father figure and keeper of random supernatural knowledge, this season Bobby has run the gamut of sacrifice, loss, anger, and determination to keep fighting." After watching Bobby confess his suicidal thoughts to Dean in "The Curious Case of Dean Winchester", she felt that "Beaver conveys all of Bobby's vulnerability and also the shame that comes from being reprimanded by Dean for wanting to give up".

Despite universal praise of Bobby by critics, Beaver commented on his blog that a minority of fans dislike the character. Don Williams of BuddyTV, however, defended him—he believes Bobby to be the show's "most important recurring guest star"—and noted that "people will complain about anything". In his response to the criticism—an article entitled "Why We Love Bobby Singer"—Williams wrote, "I think it's a shame when people like Jim Beaver or Eric Kripke have to step forward to address this vocal minority, especially when the minority is just a handful of people gathering at a certain TV website that's known for being snarky and negative about everything. The complaints of these supposed fans aren't even worth addressing, in my opinion."

== In popular culture ==
Beaver has portrayed a character also named Robert "Bob" Singer in the Amazon superhero web television series The Boys, a deliberate reference to the Supernatural character. In The Boys Singer is portrayed as the U.S. Secretary of Defense and a presidential candidate.
