= Meg Masters =

Fictional demon in the TV series Supernatural

- Supernatural character
- Rachel Miner as Meg Masters in the fifth season episode "Sympathy for the Devil"
- First appearance: "Scarecrow" (2006)
- Last appearance: "Goodbye Stranger" (2013)
- Created by: Eric Kripke; Patrick Sean Smith
- Portrayed by: Nicki Aycox (seasons 1 & 4); Jared Padalecki (season 2); Rachel Miner (seasons 5–8)
- Voiced by: Nana Mizuki (anime, Japanese dub); Erin Agostino (anime, English dub)

In-universe information
- Species: Black-eyed Demon
- Gender: Female
- Family: Azazel (father); Tom (brother); Castiel (love interest)
- Abilities: Demonic possession Invulnerability; Occult knowledge Superhuman strength Telekinesis; Teleportation

Meg Masters is a fictional character on The CW Television Network's drama and horror television series Supernatural. Created by the series' writers to develop a story arc for the first season, Meg is an unnamed demon who assumes the name of the host she possesses and begins antagonizing the series protagonists Sam and Dean Winchester. Nicki Aycox portrays her in the first season. Meg returns in the second season, possessing Sam and as such, was played by Jared Padalecki. The writers wanted Aycox to reprise the role in later seasons, but ultimately cast Rachel Miner for storyline purposes. Miner's incarnation evolves into an ally of the Winchesters and the angel Castiel over the course of the sixth, seventh, and eighth seasons.

In season 15, the entity known as the Empty assumes Meg's form to communicate with the Winchesters and Castiel.

== Plot ==
Upon possessing a young woman named Meg Masters (Nicki Aycox), the demon assumes her name and tracks down series protagonist Sam Winchester in the first season episode "Scarecrow". The two briefly meet while hitchhiking—Sam left his brother Dean to track down their missing father John—and then again at a bus station. Despite her attempts to convince him otherwise, Sam eventually leaves to help Dean with one of their supernatural investigations. Meg slits a man's throat and uses his blood to communicate with her father Azazel, the demon responsible for the death of Sam and Dean's mother. Sam encounters her again in the episode "Shadow". Finding her reappearance suspicious, Sam spies on her and realizes that she is responsible for recent deaths of natives from his hometown. The brothers confront Meg and learn that the murders were actually a trap set for John, who has been hunting Azazel. After Sam and Dean reunite with John and acquire the demon-killing Colt, Meg begins killing their friends in "Salvation" and threatens to continue doing so unless they surrender the weapon. John delivers a fake gun, but Meg and her demonic brother take him hostage after quickly realizing the deceit. Meg tracks down the brothers in search of the Colt in the season finale "Devil's Trap", but is ultimately captured and exorcised to Hell.

Meg escapes Hell in the second season and takes possession of Sam (Jared Padalecki) in "Born Under a Bad Sign", seeking revenge against the Winchesters. To trick Dean into killing his brother, she uses Sam's body to kill one of the Winchesters' fellow hunters before taking their friend Jo Harvelle hostage, attempting to convince Dean that Sam has succumbed to Azazel's influence and can't control his actions. However, Dean and the Winchesters' ally Bobby Singer realize that Sam is possessed, and despite Meg's attempt to seal herself in Sam using a binding link, she is forced to flee Sam's body once she becomes vulnerable to exorcism after Dean and Bobby burn the mark off. Meg returns in "Are You There, God? It's Me, Dean Winchester" and is one of the spirits that haunts Dean, Sam, and Bobby.

After the demons' god Lucifer is freed from Hell, Meg (Rachel Miner) resurfaces in the fifth season premiere "Sympathy for the Devil" to try to kill Dean (as he is believed to be the one who will kill Lucifer) before he can find a weapon said to be capable of killing Lucifer. Her attack leaves Bobby paralyzed, but she is forced to flee when Dean tries to kill her. She returns in "Abandon All Hope..." and sends a pack of hellhounds after Sam, Dean, and their friends Jo and Ellen Harvelle when they arrive to kill Lucifer; the confrontation ends in Jo and Ellen's deaths. After Lucifer captures the angel Castiel, an ally of the Winchesters, Meg stands guard over the prisoner until he escapes by pushing her onto the burning circle keeping him trapped, allowing him to walk over her to escape. The Winchesters ultimately send Lucifer back to Hell at the end of the season. The demon Crowley assumes reign, forcing Meg to go into hiding as a Lucifer loyalist. When Meg's forces capture Sam and Dean in the sixth season episode "Caged Heat" to find and kill the new ruler, Sam recruits her to torture Crowley until Crowley agrees to restore Sam's soul. Once Castiel seemingly kills Crowley upon the latter's admitting he can't restore Sam's soul, Meg flees before the Winchesters have the chance to kill her, too.

Crowley is later revealed to have faked his death. Meg reforms her alliance with Dean in "The Born-Again Identity" in order to stop Crowley from capturing Castiel. After Castiel absorbs damage Lucifer previously caused to Sam's mind, the Winchesters leave a now-insane Castiel in a mental hospital and Meg takes a job at the hospital to watch over him, reasoning that her status as a Lucifer loyalist marked her as Crowley's enemy and it is thus in her best interest to help the Winchesters. When Castiel partially recovers in "Reading is Fundamental," Meg alerts the brothers and later helps protect Castiel from both angels and demons. In the seventh season finale "Survival of the Fittest", Crowley finds her with Sam, Dean, and Castiel, but does not take action against her because it would upset Castiel, who is necessary to bringing down the Leviathans. Meg assists the Winchesters in killing Dick Roman, the leader of the Leviathans, by directly attacking Dick's headquarters and thus distracting his forces. However, Crowley has her captured immediately afterwards. He tortures her for the location of Lucifer's crypt, which holds a Word of God tablet about angels Crowley wants. Castiel and the Winchesters rescue Meg in the eighth season episode "Goodbye Stranger", and she takes them to the crypt's location. When Crowley arrives, Meg sacrifices herself to allow Sam, Dean, and Castiel time to escape with the tablet.

In season 15's "Destiny's Child," the Shadow, the ruler of the Empty, takes on Meg's form to communicate with Castiel, greeting him with Meg's traditional "Hello, Clarence" and adopting some of her mannerisms. Later, in "Unity," the Shadow once again appears as Meg in Death's Library. When Sam sees "Meg," he is confused until the entity explains that it is borrowing Meg's form due to its lack of one and it states that the real Meg is still dead. The Shadow then appears as Meg to Jack in "Despair" while they are both in the Empty.

== Characterization ==
Actress Nicki Aycox described Meg as having a "playful side" and a "sexuality", both of which are "tempered with an evil side underneath". In her mind, the human qualities represented the real Meg whom the demon was possessing. Aycox also found the character sarcastic, "sharp-tongued, witty, [and] smart", as well as determined to get what she wants. Likewise, series creator Eric Kripke noted that she can "really twist the knife psychologically."

"Meg is definitely tough, always has that sense of flirting, and is trying to keep some sense of integrity, even in the worst-case scenario. Unlike some characters, who are total victims in certain circumstances, she's trying to hold onto a position of power when she obviously doesn't have it."
— Rachel Miner describing Meg

The word "fiery" summed up the character for actress Rachel Miner, who noted the "devilish enjoyment" that the "obviously very evil" Meg gets from playing cat-and-mouse games with the Winchesters. In her opinion, Meg's "sense of fun" stems from her "thousands and thousands of years" of living, which have provided her "a little bit more of relaxation" because "the little things wouldn't be significant to her". In addition to describing the character as "quite powerful" and a "free spirit", Miner deemed Meg an "ambitious demon" who always has a plan and who seizes any opportunity to gain power. The actress attributed Meg's longevity to the character's sense of "[knowing] when to exit". She elaborated, "[Meg] made a hasty withdrawal and gathered her forces to come back. That's her strength... she doesn't take the brothers on unless she has the upper hand." Writer Sera Gamble admitted that her favorite aspect of Miner's interpretation of Meg was that "she always looks so annoyed" and found it "delightful" that Miner "always plays things like she's waiting for everybody else to catch up".

Gamble noted that Meg becomes "a bit of a free agent and kind of a demon rebel" following Lucifer's defeat at the end of the fifth season. Already an enemy of the new demonic ruler Crowley, her failed attempt to kill him in the sixth season puts her on "Crowley's most-wanted list". According to Miner, Meg is "just basically trying to survive" after that. Although she keeps an eye on "everything she can that might affect her, including what the Winchesters are up to", her main objective is avoiding Crowley. This desperation forces her to work with the Winchesters in later appearances.

"I'm curious to see what direction it'll go in; whether she is watching over Castiel purely for her own ends or whether there's actually some part of her that cares about him."
— Miner on Meg's relationship with Castiel

In regards to Meg meeting the angel Castiel for the first time in the fifth season, Miner noted the "fun moment where it looks like maybe Cass and [Meg] could kiss". The actress enjoyed the flirtation, pointing out that "of course the demon would want the angel to give in to his lesser instincts". This "demon-angel dichotomy" continues in the sixth season, although Miner was uncertain whether Meg was merely toying with Castiel. "It's complex when you are dealing with a demon," she explained, "but Castiel definitely sparks her interest more than most. He had some effect on her especially with that kiss." Nevertheless, she later deemed the flirtation as "just a fun deviation" for the characters. Actor Misha Collins, who portrays Castiel, acknowledged that Meg "is still turning up the heat on the sexual tension between Cas and herself" in the seventh season. Describing her as "sort of a helper", he joked, "Again, of course, it’s a strained relationship. Cas likes her... Sam and Dean have a little more trouble with her." Like Miner, he called her true motives with both Castiel and the Winchesters "a lingering question" at that time. The pair are "actually happy to work with one another again" in the eighth season, however, with Collins noting a "remarkably tender moment" between Meg and Castiel that is "unusual for the show".

== Development ==
With the initial episodes of the first season featuring mostly unconnected storylines, the writers became desperate to begin developing a mythology for the series. They thus crafted Meg as a recurring antagonist, but at the time were otherwise unsure of what direction to take her. Executive producer Kim Manners had previously directed an episode of the series Over There featuring Aycox, and hand-selected her for the role of Meg. On developing the character and her storyline, Aycox noted that they "really just felt [their] way through" and described it as "very trial and error".

"I think that when you bring a woman on that's going to be a powerful character, there's definitely going to be some sexuality put into the character. I added a lot of it on my own, but it was definitely in the script as well."
— Aycox on developing Meg

The actress's strategy in "Scarecrow" was to surprise the audience—the episode's conclusion reveals that Meg is a demon—by portraying her as "a truly innocent girl who's lost and on her way to somewhere else". In designing the costume for that episode, Diane Widas wanted to reflect that Meg was traveling but also dress her as "a girl that the boys would be interested in". As Aycox became more comfortable on-set and saw how the series leads Jared Padalecki and Jensen Ackles were "playful" and "up for anything", she gained the confidence to bring a "sexuality" to the character. Given free rein over the character by production, Aycox also tried to make Meg "very stylized". Widas reflected this character progression by giving her a yellow leather jacket as she "got stronger" and a red leather jacket when her demonic side fully emerged in the first season finale. The character was seemingly killed off in the same episode, a decision that Manners disagreed with because he thought that she had potential to be a "great nemesis" for the Winchesters, akin to the Cigarette Smoking Man of the series The X-Files. Agreeing that Meg was "a really formidable adversary" for the Winchesters, Kripke chose to bring her back to the series later on.

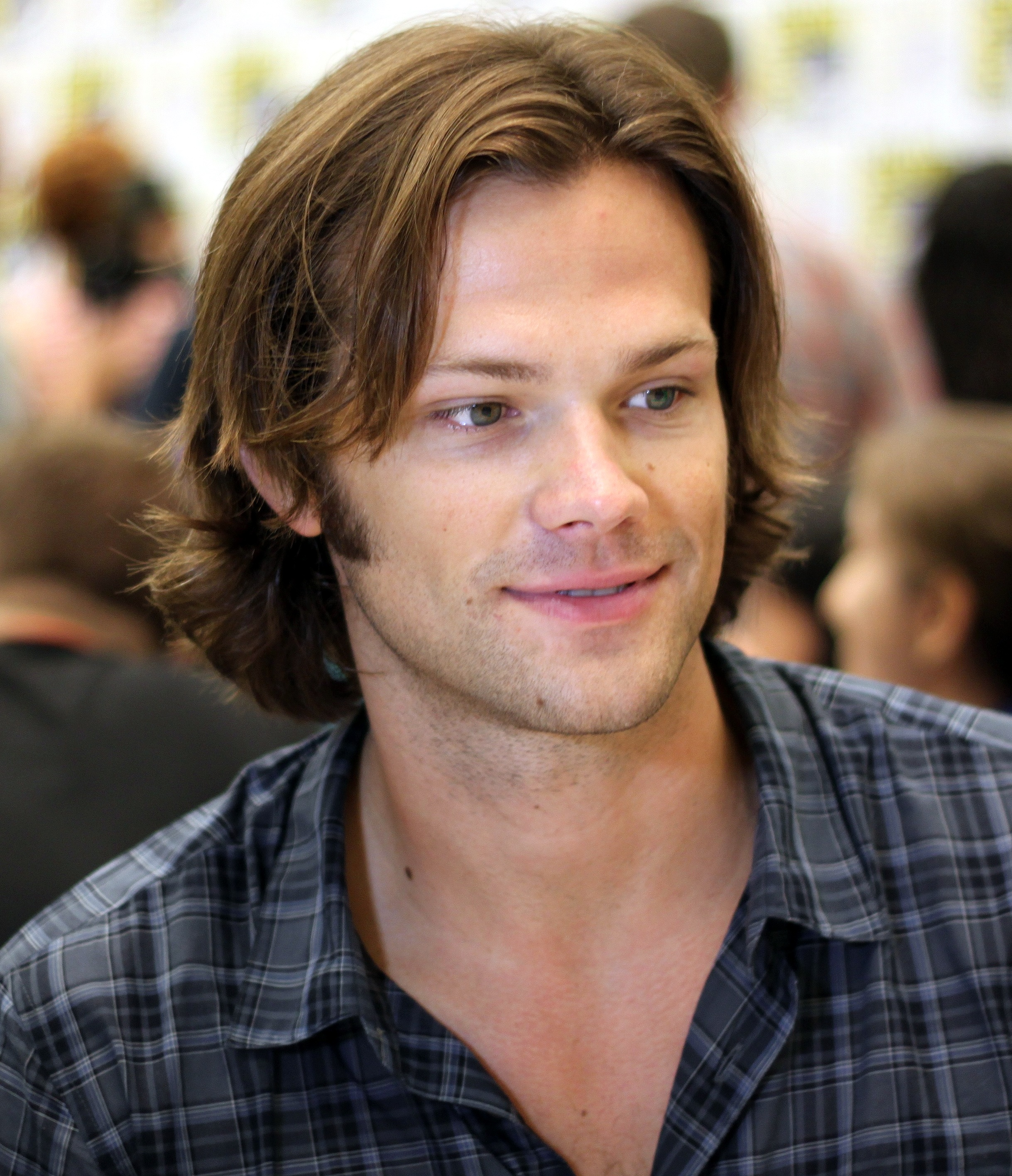
Jared Padalecki's character Sam Winchester becomes possessed by Meg in the show's second season.

The show's second season involves a subplot of whether Sam would turn evil, and the writers wanted an episode where Sam would wake up covered in blood after having killed a person. Realizing that demonic possession could explain his actions, the writers brought back Meg because she would want revenge for being exorcised. This became the episode "Born Under a Bad Sign". Cathryn Humphris, the writer of that episode, felt that the idea of Meg possessing Sam "provided a good opportunity to see what [being evil] would look like for Sam, and what Dean's response to that might be". For most of the episode, Sam is depicted as "scared, confused, and angry", only to reveal the "characteristic demon swagger" after he takes Jo hostage. Padalecki prepared by watching Aycox's performance as Meg in past episodes and the actress praised him on his portrayal of her character, feeling that he picked up on her "own personal mannerisms... like little tics and looks and things like that". Director J. Miller Tobin believed Padalecki did a "terrific job of... just being so smarmy and so in your face".

After Meg's disappearance, Kripke repeatedly asked the writers what she was doing off-screen and eventually elected to write her into the fifth season premiere "Sympathy for the Devil" himself. The writers wanted Aycox to again reprise the role—the actress had already returned in the fourth season episode "Are You There, God? It's Me, Dean Winchester" as the spirit of the actual Meg Masters—and brainstormed reasons why the demon would want to return to her old host after the body had been buried and rotting for years, but ultimately deemed it too impractical and chose to recast. Because the writers still wanted to pay credit to Aycox, "the bar was set very high" during the casting process. Miner received the role, with Kripke finding her "just so interesting and complicated and sexy and idiosyncratic" and with "so many different layers".

Miner had not seen the series before, and only had the opportunity before filming to view a few clips of Aycox's episodes. She wanted to avoid merely copying Aycox's performance, but at the same time did not want to stray too far because it was the same character. However, she found that she did not have to alter her performance because the character was "written so specifically that the choices were very similar". Respecting prior depictions of Meg, Miner said, "I did take to heart that the character meant so much to people... That became something I took into consideration because I didn't want to disappoint people by taking away from what was originally there." Upon being asked to return for "Abandon All Hope...", she declined a film offer because it conflicted with the series' filming.

The sixth season episode "Caged Heat" originally involved Lenore, a vampire whom the Winchesters spared in the second season, but the writers replaced her with Meg when Lenore's actress Amber Benson was unavailable. Meg's increased presence in the episode as compared to previous appearances with Miner in the role surprised the actress. Miner cited it as her favorite episode, explaining, "The episode took Meg in a lot of directions that you might not have expected and that were fun to play."

The character was killed off in the eighth season. Feeling that "when someone dies, you want it to count a little bit", executive producer Jeremy Carver stated that "there are no immediate plans to bring her back".

== Reception ==
Maureen Ryan of Chicago Tribune deemed Aycox's incarnation of Meg a "good addition to the show" who "[spiced] things up a bit", recalling that she had been "shocked" when Meg was revealed to be a villain at the end of her introductory episode. Ryan enjoyed how the character toyed around with the Winchesters, and thought the human Meg's final moments were "well done". Diana Steenbergen of IGN, on the other hand, found Meg's attempts to "out-tough and out-snark the boys" uninteresting. In her 2008 review of the episode "Shadow", she compared Meg's characterization to that of subsequent Supernatural female characters Jo Harvelle, Ruby, and Bela Talbot, feeling that all four characters were too similar and thus "even more tiresome" as a result. Steenbergen further wrote, "The show has managed to make interesting, three-dimensional, flawed yet heroic male characters; it is high time to spread that care toward the recurring female characters." She gave Meg a much more positive reception in "Born Under a Bad Sign", calling the plot twist that the character was possessing Sam "excellent" and praising Padalecki's portrayal of the character, which Steenbergen found "exceptionally entertaining". She described Meg's interaction with Jo while posing as Sam as "disturbing", and noted, "[Padalecki] infuses everything [Meg] says and does with a sly menace and by the end he is holding nothing back...[he] effortlessly switches from taunting...back into innocent-sounding Sammy begging his brother to help him". Comparing Padalecki's previous portrayals of an evil Sam, Tina Charles of TV Guide believed Padalecki "outdid himself" as Meg. "I just think that Jared had to relish the different levels of intensity Sam was put through," she wrote. "It showed, and he did such a great job."

Tim Janson of Mania believed that neither Aycox nor Padalecki portrayed Meg "with such dripping sarcasm as Rachel Miner". He felt that she "always adds spice when she appears", and deemed the bonding scenes between Meg and Sam in "Goodbye Stranger" to be "priceless". Similarly, Steenbergen felt Miner played the role "with vicious flair" and "[conveyed] Meg's brutality well, right from the beginning". As time passed, she noted that the actress "has done well taking over the role". Like Janson, Steenbergen particularly enjoyed the conversation between Meg and Sam in "Goodbye Stranger". In regard to this final appearance, she wrote, "If you had told me a few years ago that Meg’s death would be sad I wouldn’t have believed you, but it was." Miner's incarnation of Meg received praise from Jordan Farley of SFX, as well. Farley wrote, "As a demon turned good (sort of) she occupies a moral grey zone that leaves her actions completely unpredictable even after year’s [sic] of guest appearances, a refreshing quality for a character to have. And she’s funny." Ryan also liked Miner's portrayal of the character.

However, other reviewers were not as favorable to Miner. Laura Prudom of Huffington Post felt Aycox portrayed the character with a "lot more subtlety" than Miner and preferred Meg's darker appearances prior to Miner, finding it "hard to reconcile the demon who possessed Sam and went on a killing and torture spree in the phenomenal 'Born Under a Bad Sign' with the character we've seen in the past couple of years". Nevertheless, she was "impressed that [Meg] went out fighting for what was right". Though Charles liked Miner's portrayal, she complained that the character's dialogue "always [seemed] to be a series of one-liners" and found that the character's large role in "Reading is Fundamental" detracted from the episode for her, explaining that she "[likes] Meg but in smaller doses." She, too, preferred Aycox over Miner in the role. John Kubicek of BuddyTV and Sandra Gonzalez of Entertainment Weekly also favored Aycox's portrayal of the character.
