= Azazel (Supernatural) =

Fictional demon in Supernatural

- Supernatural character
- Fredric Lehne as Azazel
- First appearance: "Pilot" (2005)
- Last appearance: "Exile on Main St." (2010)
- Created by: Eric Kripke
- Portrayed by: Fredric Lehne (main); Jeffrey Dean Morgan, Mitch Pileggi, Rob LaBelle, Lindsey McKeon, etc. (possessing)
- Voiced by: Naoya Uchida (anime, Japanese dub); Alain Goulem (anime, English dub)

In-universe information
- Nicknames: The Demon; The Yellow-Eyed Demon; Yellow Eyes
- Species: Yellow-eyed Demon (Prince of Hell)
- Gender: Male
- Title: Prince of Hell
- Occupation: General of Hell's Demon Army
- Family: Lucifer (creator); Ramiel (brother); Dagon (sister); Asmodeus (brother)
- Children: Meg Masters; Tom
- Abilities: Demonic pacts Demonic possession Dream manipulation Invulnerability; Pyrokinesis; Superhuman strength Telekinesis; Teleportation

Azazel is a fictional character that appears on The CW Television Network's drama and horror television series Supernatural. He serves as the main antagonist during the first two seasons. As a demon Prince of Hell, he feeds his blood to infants so that they will grow up to develop demonic abilities, while also manipulating and deceiving others into carrying out his ambitions, often through self-serving and one-sided deals of his construction. His goal of using one such child to release Lucifer is not revealed until much later in the series. Azazel is referred to by nicknames such as "The Yellow-Eyed Demon," or "Yellow Eyes" throughout the first two seasons, his true name not being revealed until the third season. Due to the character's demonic nature of taking different hosts, Azazel has been played by numerous actors but Fredric Lehne is the main default portrayer. All the incarnations have maintained his sadistic sense of humor and irony. Azazel's popularity and importance towards the franchise even led him to be the main antagonist and the analogue to Lucifer in the anime adaptation, as the "Yellow-Eyed Demon," in reference to the nickname he had in the original first two seasons.

== Plot ==
The tyrannical leader of an army of demons, Azazel first appears in the pilot episode of the series, but plot devices such as flashbacks and time travel detail his background in later seasons. He is one of the four Princes of Hell, along with Ramiel, Asmodeus and Dagon, and the most devoted to Lucifer. His earliest chronological depiction occurs in the fourth season finale, "Lucifer Rising". Having spent years searching, Azazel (Rob LaBelle) finally located the doorway to Lucifer's prison in 1972. The fallen angel tasked him with freeing the demon Lilith from Hell—she is needed to break the 66 seals holding Lucifer captive—and to find him a "special child".

By the following year, Azazel began making demonic pacts with young individuals; in exchange for a wish, he would be allowed to enter their homes ten years later. Azazel eventually comes across Mary Campbell, the future mother of series protagonists Sam and Dean Winchester. After taking possession of her father (Mitch Pileggi), he kills her mother and stabs himself to kill his host. Mary's fiancé, John Winchester, is the demon's next victim. Azazel makes his usual offer, giving her the chance to resurrect John, to produce a child he can use; now orphaned and alone, she reluctantly agrees without knowing his true intentions.

In 1983, Mary discovers Azazel standing over baby Sam's crib; he had been feeding his blood to the infant. Upon being interrupted, the demon pins her to the ceiling, slashes her stomach and causes her to burst into flames. Her death inspires John to dedicate his life to hunting down Azazel, at the same time training Sam and Dean to hunt supernatural creatures.

As revealed in the fifth season finale, "Swan Song", Azazel sent demons to possess important people in Sam's life, secretly manipulating him as he grew up. However, Sam eventually leaves the life of hunting to attend college. Azazel orders the assassination of Sam's girlfriend Jessica Moore, who was a distraction. Her death prompts Sam to return to hunting.

Demons cannot be killed by conventional means so the Winchesters track down the Colt—a mystic gun capable of killing anything—in "Dead Man's Blood". In the following episode, "Salvation", they trace the omens caused by the demon's presence to Salvation, Iowa. As he did with Sam and countless others, Azazel plans to visit a six-month-old and feed her his blood so she will later develop demonic abilities. Although Sam interrupts the demon's plans and saves the family, Azazel escapes. Meanwhile, the demonic Meg Masters and her "brother" Tom kidnap John, and then set their sights on Sam and Dean.

The brothers exorcise Meg in the season finale "Devil's Trap", and her host discloses John's location. Sam and Dean rescue him and kill Tom. After being taken to a secluded location, however, John is revealed to be possessed. An angry Azazel (Jeffrey Dean Morgan) chastises them for killing Meg and Tom—he deems them his "children"—and begins to torture the brothers. John temporarily retakes control, giving Sam the opportunity to grab the Colt. Unable to kill his father, Sam shoots John in the leg, and the demon flees from his host. As the Winchesters make their escape, a demonically-possessed truck driver crashes into their car. Dean is left dying in a coma, forcing John to sell his soul and the Colt to Azazel (Fredric Lehne) to save him. Azazel demonically possesses Tessa, a reaper (Lindsey McKeon) to save Dean from death and fulfill his part of the deal.

Azazel's last appearance chronologically is in the second season finale "All Hell Breaks Loose", where he kidnaps Sam and the other young adults that he had infected. He visits Sam in a dream, and reveals that his "special children" must fight to the death to determine who will lead his army. Although Sam is the demon's favorite, the super-strong Jake Talley becomes the winner. As Dean sells his soul to another demon in exchange for Sam's resurrection, Azazel gives Jake the Colt and coerces him to travel to a cemetery in the middle of a giant devil's trap. Though Sam and Dean, along with other hunters, attempt to stop him, Jake uses the Colt as a key to unlock a mausoleum there. This action briefly opens a gateway to Hell, releasing Lilith and hundreds of other demons. With the devil's trap around the cemetery now broken, Azazel confronts the Winchesters and easily overpowers them. However, John's soul escapes through the Gate, and distracts Azazel long enough for Dean to shoot him dead with the Colt.

Sam later learns that Azazel did not personally kill his girlfriend Jess but had a demon possessing his friend Brady do it to drive Sam back into hunting. Brady is revealed to be just one of the many people throughout Sam's life that have been possessed by demons sent by Azazel to keep an eye on him, "Azazel's gang" as Lucifer refers to them.

In the sixth season premiere, "Exile on Main St.," Azazel reappears as part of Dean's hallucinations under djinn poisoning, embodying Dean's fear that his old life will catch up with him and destroy the regular life Dean is building with Lisa Braeden.

In The Winchesters, Dean gives an alternate universe version of his parents the Colt and warns them to use it in case they ever encounter Azazel, knowing from his own universe that Azazel is due to force Mary into a deal the next year.

== Characterization ==
Deeming Azazel to be "an angry soul", actor Fredric Lehne believed that the character having been "denied Heaven and everything else that's good in the universe" has "[translated] into anger and vengeance". A demon with a sense of humor, Azazel takes pleasure in seeing people suffer (schadenfreude). "The more pain—mostly psychological pain—he causes, the happier he is ... He gets off on the power of turning people to his will", Lehne explained. This quality suggests to the actor why the demon favored Sam as the potential leader of his army. Being the "most ripe for picking" because he had the "sweetest" heart, Sam was "most desirable for corrupting" of all the children; Lehne described Azazel's thought process as, "If I could turn him, then I had truly won." The character's ultimate motivation, however, is to free Lucifer from his imprisonment in Hell. On this, Supernatural co-executive producer Ben Edlund mentioned his view of Azazel as one of "a little cult of demonic true believers" that encompasses many of the important demon characters in the series.

== Development ==
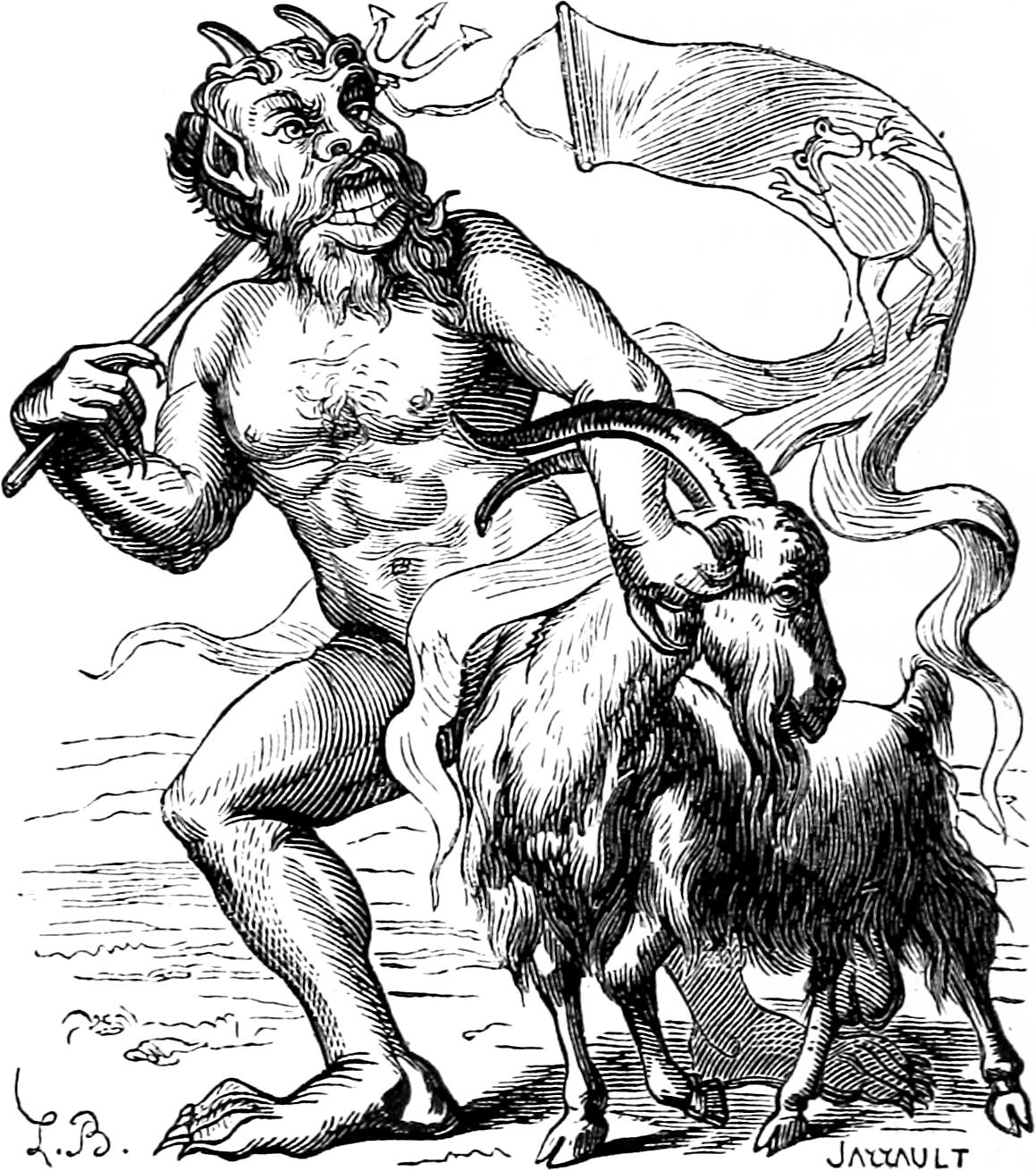
Azazel is first mentioned in Leviticus 16:8. God orders Aaron to send to him a goat carrying all of the Israelites' sins.

For Azazel's first full appearance on the series in "Devil's Trap", the writers initially could not decide which Winchester—Sam, Dean, or John—to have the demon possess. However, actor Jeffrey Dean Morgan's busy schedule made them realize that having John kidnapped and possessed, and therefore absent from much of the episode, would be the only practical choice. Noting that the first season focuses on Sam and Dean trying to find both their father and Azazel, series creator Eric Kripke noted that from a storytelling perspective "it had to be" that "they'd find both of them at the same time...in the same body". Though the writers modeled Azazel's personality after Al Pacino's demonic sense of humor in the film The Devil's Advocate, they gave Morgan free rein over the character's mannerisms. Only directed to "be different from John", Morgan changed his voice and mimicked Jack Nicholson's "freaky" speech pattern from The Shining.

Morgan's "Nicholson-esque quality" continues with actor Fredric Lehne. Though uncertain of why he was specifically sought out—Lehne chalks it up to his previous working experience with executive producers Kim Manners and Robert Singer—the role was offered to him without an audition. The actor avoided copying Morgan's portrayal, but noted that the writing "lends itself to doing it in a certain way".

Since Azazel changes human hosts periodically, Lehne's initial appearance in the second season premiere, "In My Time of Dying", was intended to be a one-time deal. Thoroughly impressed, however, the show runners kept him for the season finale. Despite the character's death, Lehne returned to the role in the sixth season premiere as a hallucination.

A dream sequence in "All Hell Breaks Loose" hints at Mary Winchester's connection to Azazel. Although the writers intended to address this in the third season, it was pushed back to the fourth season episode "In the Beginning" due to the 2007–2008 Writers Guild of America strike.

Kripke asked Mitch Pileggi to enact this revelation—the two had previously worked together on the series Tarzan—and the actor accepted because Kim Manners and much of the Supernatural crew had also worked on The X-Files. While Pileggi emulated Lehne's performance, he tried to "put his own spin on it".

Morgan, Lehne, and actress Lindsey McKeon wore hard, colored contact lenses during their portrayals of Azazel. The lenses eventually became painful, and would greatly obscure their vision. The production crew placed sandbags on the floor to help Morgan and Lehne locate their marks, and a grip held Lehne's hand as he walked around a campfire in "All Hell Breaks Loose". McKeon's brief scene in "In My Time of Dying"—she touches actor Jensen Ackles' forehead—took nine takes to film because she kept missing. Although Pileggi was fitted for the lenses, production ultimately added the effect digitally at "appropriate moments".

== Reception ==
Azazel has been met with universal praise from critics and fans alike, with the latter voting him as the best villain of the series in a poll conducted by BuddyTV. "[You] have to realize that without [Azazel] there would be no reason for the boys to hunt in the first place," viewers wrote, also calling him the "oldest arch nemesis" and a "classic supernatural badass". The results of the poll revealed that Azazel had won with 75% of the votes, with the second-highest percentage of votes for another character (Alastair) being only 9%.

Both Karla Peterson of The San Diego Union-Tribune and Maureen Ryan of the Chicago Tribune felt that Morgan gave "his best and most believable performance of the season" in "Devil's Trap", with the latter adding, "He was really on fire in that scene, and it brought a whole new intensity to his performance." Diana Steenbergen of IGN found him "menacing, with his low voice and the cruel words ... trying to tear them apart emotionally before tearing Dean apart literally", and enjoyed the sadistic and "vicious humor" that makes the character "more sinister". However, she believed that Azazel having a family was an unnecessary parallel with the Winchesters that "doesn't quite make sense". After viewing the episode, Brian Tallerico of UGO gave his opinion that the series should follow Buffy the Vampire Slayer's format of having a different recurring villain each season. "If the firestarting demon is the Big Bad for the first two seasons, that's fine", he commented, "but don't drag it out longer than that. Fans will get bored. And there's nothing scarier than that.

Tina Charles of TV Guide was happy to see the "appropriately creepy" Lehne return to the role in "All Hell Breaks Loose". "The second he popped in at ghost town central ... the scare factor went up", she wrote. Likewise, Tom Burns of UGO deemed all of Lehne's scenes "damn near riveting", while Brett Love of TV Squad described him as "a perfect evil menace". Diana Steenbergen of IGN deemed Lehne's performance "charismatic and quietly sadistic without being overdone". Despite this praise, she was happy to see the character die because "it frees the show from bogging down by having the Winchesters chasing after the same villain endlessly" and "opens up the opportunity to explore new plots".

Pileggi's casting in "In the Beginning" was "a cool move" for Charles, who found his performance "scary". Similarly, Steenbergen called Pileggi "a force to be reckoned" who "has a chance to be both funny and disturbing". According to publicists of Warner Bros., the fans "were very happy with what [they] did" in the episode.
