= John Winchester (Supernatural) =

Character from the television series Supernatural

- Supernatural / The Winchesters character
- Jeffrey Dean Morgan as John Winchester
- First appearance: "Pilot"; Supernatural; September 13, 2005
- Last appearance: "Hey, That's No Way to Say Goodbye"; The Winchesters; March 7, 2023
- Created by: Eric Kripke
- Portrayed by: Jeffrey Dean Morgan; Matt Cohen (young); Drake Rodger (young; The Winchesters); Nels Guloien (child)
- Voiced by: Takaya Hashi (anime, Japanese dub); Alain Goulem (anime, English dub)

In-universe information
- Species: Human
- Gender: Male
- Occupation: Hunter; Former mechanic Former Marine
- Family: Henry Winchester (father); Millie Winchester (mother)
- Spouses: Mary Campbell
- Children: Dean Winchester (son); Sam Winchester (son); Adam Milligan (son)
- Nationality: American
- Rank: Corporal

John Eric Winchester is a fictional character on The CW's series Supernatural and the protagonist of the comic book spin-off series Supernatural: Origins. Developed by series creator Eric Kripke, the character is mainly portrayed by Jeffrey Dean Morgan. John is the father of Sam and Dean Winchester, the show's protagonists.

Seeking revenge after his wife Mary was killed by the demon Azazel, John Winchester became a hunter and raised his two sons to fight the supernatural. John disappears early in Supernatural, and the first season revolves primarily around Sam and Dean trying to find him. Morgan was also filming episodes of Grey's Anatomy while the first season of Supernatural was under production, and future appearances of the character were hindered by his busy schedule. While Morgan's portrayal has been praised, fans and critics were generally frustrated toward the character for keeping so many secrets.

Morgan reprised the role as John Winchester for the show's 300th episode "Lebanon".

Drake Rodger portrays a young John in the spin-off sequel series The Winchesters.

== Plot ==
=== Supernatural ===
The father of series protagonists Sam and Dean Winchester, John Winchester first appears in the pilot episode of the series, set in 1983 (age 29), but plot devices such as flashbacks and time travel detail his background in later seasons. Apparently abandoned by his father at a young age—his father actually died while serving a secret order known as the Men of Letters—John Winchester grew up hating the man. John left high school to join the Marine Corps, eventually attaining the rank of corporal and receiving many medals for his service in Vietnam. After leaving the service, he found a job as a mechanic, and fell in love with Mary Campbell.

In the fourth season episode "In the beginning" , Dean is sent back through time by the angel Castiel. Dean meets his parents' former selves and convinces John to buy the 1967 Chevy Impala that he eventually inherits. Dean later watches John being killed by Azazel, though the demon then resurrects him in exchange for Mary's permission to enter her house in ten years. When the angel Anna Milton travels back in time in the fifth-season episode "The Song Remains the Same" to prevent the births of Sam and Dean, John agrees to serve as a temporary vessel for the archangel Michael to stop her. Michael kills Anna and erases John and Mary's memories of the incident.

Azazel later uses his pact with Mary to enter their home in the pilot episode, and ultimately kills her. The second-season episode "All Hell Breaks Loose, Part One" reveals that she had witnessed the demon secretly feeding his blood to Sam. John investigated the incident and learned of the existence of the supernatural. His desire to find and kill Azazel led him to become a hunter of supernatural creatures. He took his sons with him during his travels, but often left them alone in motels for long periods of time during his hunts, leaving Dean with instructions to "shoot first and ask questions later" while watching over Sam.

As revealed in the fourth season episode "Jump the Shark," John slept with a woman he met while away on a hunt. Learning over a decade later that he had fathered her son Adam, John made occasional visits over the years to partake in father-son activities with him. He hid the truth from Adam to protect him, and never revealed to him the existence of Sam and Dean, nor vice versa. Meanwhile, John trained Sam and Dean to become hunters. However, Sam later left this life to start anew in college, leading to a fallout between John and his son.

Twenty-two years after Mary's death, John disappears while on a hunt, forcing Sam and Dean to reunite in an unsuccessful attempt to find him. Sam returns to the life of a hunter after Azazel kills his girlfriend. John reluctantly chooses to avoid his sons throughout most of the season while he investigates something, eventually reuniting with them in the episode "Shadow." However, the demonic Meg Masters attacks them and reveals that Azazel is after John. After escaping from Meg, the brothers split up from their father to keep him from the demons.

When vampires murder his old mentor and steal the Colt—a mystical gun capable of killing anything—John teams up with Sam and Dean in "Dead Man's Blood" to retrieve it. Because demons cannot be killed by conventional means, they hope that the Colt will be effective against Azazel. In response, Meg begins killing the Winchesters' friends in "Salvation," and threatens to kill more unless they deliver the Colt. John is captured after trying to give her a fake gun, and reveals himself to be possessed by Azazel when the brothers come to his rescue in the first-season finale "Devil's Trap." However, he manages to resist the demon's control. Despite John's pleas for Sam to shoot him with the Colt, Sam cannot bring himself to do so and allows Azazel to escape. As the Winchesters flee in Dean's Impala, a demonically possessed trucker crashes into them.

In the second-season premiere, "In My Time of Dying," Sam and John awake in the hospital with only minor injuries, but a dying Dean is comatose. John secretly summons Azazel and seems to know what the demon's plans are. He then makes a deal to save Dean, giving up his life, soul, and the Colt. Before dying, John tells Dean, if he can't save Sam, he'll have to kill him, should he become evil.

The fourth season episode "On the Head of a Pin" reveals that the demon Alastair tortured John in Hell for over a century, with John refusing the demon's offer to stop if he himself would torture someone else. His soul escapes from Hell in the second-season finale "All Hell Breaks Loose, Part 2" when a gateway to Hell is opened. He saves Dean from Azazel and distracts the demon by temporarily forcing him out of his host, long enough for Dean to kill Azazel with the Colt when he returns to his usual body. John then gives Sam and Dean a loving smile before becoming engulfed in a white light. However, the fifth-season episode "Dark Side of the Moon" suggests that he might not be in Heaven.

In the show's 300th episode, "Lebanon", Sam and Dean accidentally draw John from 2003 into their timeline when they acquire a Chinese pearl that grants the owner's greatest wish. This 'trip' allows John to learn of his father's disappearance, confirm his knowledge of the Apocalypse, witness the Men of Letters bunker, and learn about Mary's resurrection, as well as allowing Sam and Dean a chance to apologise to him for their past fights and forgive him for his failings as a parent.

However, John being drawn into the future begins to cause changes to history. Dean and Sam see 'Wanted' posters identifying Dean as a serial killer. Sam is now an internet celebrity who is also the head of his own law firm. Castiel is still a loyal servant of Heaven and the living Zachariah, who attack the Winchesters to investigate the disruption to the timeline. The Winchesters are able to kill Zachariah and banish Castiel. While the Winchesters debate about their next course of action before the new timeline changes them as well as everything else, they are eventually forced to send John back to his time believing that his trip to the future was just a dream. He departs accepting his fate, and assuring Dean and Sam that he understands their decision, also adding that he is proud of the men his sons have become.

After Mary is accidentally killed by the Nephilim Jack Kline in "Absence", Castiel attempts to retrieve her from Heaven, but decides to leave her alone when he finds that she is with John Winchester once again, affirming that John went to Heaven after his escape from Hell. In the next episode, the angel Dumah confirms John and Mary are sharing a Heaven together and threatens to end their peace with a snap of her fingers to force Castiel to comply with her demands. In retaliation, Castiel kills Dumah with an angel blade to protect John and Mary and end her reign of terror.

In the series finale, "Carry On", Dean arrives in Heaven after his death and meets with Bobby Singer, who confirms that John and Mary are still together in their own little piece of heaven. After Sam dies and arrives, it is assumed that the two brothers go to reunite with their parents as a family for the first time since the very beginning of the series (although this is never shown).

=== The Winchesters ===
On March 23, 1972, John returns home from the Vietnam War and meets Mary Campbell. Having received a letter from his long-missing father Henry, John is drawn to a Men of Letters clubhouse in Lawrence, Kansas where Mary saves him from a demon. In the clubhouse, John learns that his father is a Man of Letters and becomes involved in Mary's hunt for her missing father Samuel who was after a magical box that can trap and destroy monsters. Introduced to the world of the supernatural, John quickly becomes enamored with both hunting and Mary, helping her to find the box in a New Orleans cemetery and slaying a loup-garou watchdog. Now aware of the dangers of the world, John decides to become a hunter, telling his mother that he feels that he was born for "saving people, hunting things," which would later become the basis of the Winchester family's motto. With the threat of the Akrida preparing to invade the Earth, John joins Mary and his new friends Latika, Carlos and Ada in searching for Samuel and stopping the Akrida.

John and his friends, dubbed the Monster Club, continue hunting for the Akrida and the missing Samuel, coming up against rare monsters from other cultures such as La Tunda and Bori Baba. John's hunting puts him at odds with his mother, who fears losing him like she had lost Henry, while he continues to grow closer to Mary. John is also reunited with his ex-fiancée Betty, now a Lawrence cop, having apparently ended their relationship before he left for Vietnam. The Bori Baba case brings them back together and they make amends, parting amicably with Betty returning his engagement ring and asking to remain friends. John later faces the Celtiberian deity Mars Neto, who heals John's war scars and states that John can be molded into the perfect weapon for the war with the Akrida.

The hunt for the Akrida eventually leads to John summoning Henry's ghost for answers. Just before finally reuniting with Samuel, John and Mary kiss. John later recognizes the man who had given him Henry's letter in one of Samuel's pictures, revealing the culprit to be his son Dean. John and Mary begin a romantic relationship with each other, but John encounters trouble when the Akrida frame him for murder, sending John on the run until Millie and Betty are able to clear his name and putting a strain on John and Mary's relationship.

In a final confrontation, Mary is able to kill the Akrida Queen with the Impala as the car is not from their world, destroying the Akrida. Dean reveals to John and Mary that they exist in an alternate universe to his own world, one that Dean had visited after his death while searching the Multiverse for a world where his family got a chance at a happy ending. Discovering the threat of the Akrida, who were created by Chuck as a failsafe in case of his defeat, Dean broke the rules to intervene and guide his parents and their friends to stop the Akrida who threatened Dean's world and Sam too. Confident that he's found a world where his parents have a chance at a happy ending together, Dean provides them with his own hunter's journal to guide them as John's journal had done throughout his life and the Colt in case they encounter Azazel so that John and Mary can kill the demon and change their fates. Afterwards, John and Mary leave Lawrence to figure out their futures together as their friends continue hunting.

== Characterization ==
Actor Jeffrey Dean Morgan deemed John a "tormented soul," motivated by an "equal combination of revenge and protecting his sons." Following the death of their mother, Sam and Dean became secondary to John's quest of killing the demon responsible, although Morgan believed that this aspect changed once John began spending more time with them again. Though he thought that John was not the world's best dad and "definitely made a lot of mistakes," the actor noted that "he did things, even when they were wrong, for the good of his sons."

John Kubicek of BuddyTV felt that this reasoning extended to John's decision to hide the truth from Adam to protect him. Kubicek also suggested that John became involved in Adam's life to achieve "some level of normalcy" as a father, an opportunity he had previously lost following the death of Sam and Dean's mother. Overall, Morgan felt that John "loved those kids more than he loved his own life," with the character's demonic pact with Azazel serving as "his way of finding redemption."

Regarding his portrayal of the character, Morgan commented, "I played him with extra angst. I think what was on the page, what I foresaw—not knowing where it was going, because no one would ever tell me anything—there was always a lot more going on in his head than he was going to show anybody, including his sons. Because, indeed, there was a lot more going on." Kripke later confirmed this, stating, "It's our view that John knew everything the producers of the show know. John knew stuff we're not even ready to reveal, that won't come out for a couple of seasons. He was an awesome hunter, and by the time he showed up in 'Dead Man's Blood,' he knew it all."

== Development ==
In writing the pilot episode, series creator Eric Kripke made several dramatic revisions to John's storyline. The first draft of the script had Sam and Dean being raised by their aunt and uncle, though this was changed when Kripke realized that the backstory became much less complicated by having John raise them on the road. Another revision had John dying at the end of the episode instead of Sam's girlfriend Jessica. Though he survives in the final version of the pilot, the writers decided halfway through production of the first season that John did have to die, as they believed his separation from his sons "split the show" by having him away "doing more interesting things than the boys are doing."

Kripke also felt that John kept Sam and Dean away from the "front lines," his death being required to allow the brothers to "explore, investigate and confront the yellow-eyed demon directly." The writers initially intended for John to die in the car accident in "Devil's Trap," but they ultimately postponed his death to prevent the finale from becoming too dark. Following the character's eventual escape from Hell, executive producer Ben Edlund stated that even the writers are unsure of where John's soul ended up.

Evil Dead actor Bruce Campbell was Kripke's first choice to portray the character. However, Campbell was unavailable, and Jeffrey Dean Morgan eventually received the role. Due to the fact that Morgan's scene in the pilot episode takes place 22 years before the series, Morgan expected to be replaced by an older actor for subsequent episodes. Being only 12 years older than Jensen Ackles, who portrays the eldest son Dean, Morgan was surprised when he was asked to reprise the role.

Ackles and Jared Padalecki often teased him about the age difference during filming. Throughout the season, Morgan became frustrated at times due to his character's avoidance of his sons, stating, "It pissed off everybody, it pissed off us as actors, it pissed off the audience watching, because none of us really knew where we were gonna go." However, he reasoned that John's motivation for his actions was due to having knowledge that nobody else had.

During production of Supernatural's first season, Morgan was also working on the shows Weeds and Grey's Anatomy, so he was often traveling back and forth between Los Angeles and Vancouver, British Columbia. This interfered at times with Morgan's acting, as he had trouble getting "Winchester-y enough" after portraying the nice character of Denny Duquette on Grey's Anatomy. Morgan commented, "I was stuck in Denny-land, where I was being too nice. Winchester's harder to find. Denny's more me. He's an intense guy, John is. And Denny, for a guy who's having trouble living, he's just a charming dude."

Morgan was at first reluctant to return for Supernatural's second season due to his role on Grey's Anatomy. Although he lent his voice for the third season episode "Long-Distance Call," future appearances of Morgan as the character after the second season have been hindered due to the actor's busy schedule. Nevertheless, both Kripke and writer Sera Gamble have stated that they "would love to have him back." The scheduling conflict has continued into the sixth season of Supernatural, with executive producer Robert Singer revealing that the writers had considered bringing the character back in the alternate reality episode "My Heart Will Go On" instead of Ellen Harvelle, but due to concerns that they would not be able to secure Morgan's return, they ultimately chose Ellen for the deceased character they would have (temporarily) return in the episode.

During the production of the fifth season, Morgan had an interview with MovieWeb in which he stated that no one from the show had contacted him about making another appearance, and expressed the desire to return for at least one more episode in what was then-believed to be the show's final season, as he had enjoyed working with Ackles and Padalecki, and he felt that John's storyline had ended too soon.

== Reception ==
While critics praised Morgan for his performance in the role, their reaction to the character has generally been mixed. Don Williams of BuddyTV felt that John is a "rather divisive character", with some fans not understanding John's motivation for keeping his sons in the dark. However, Williams himself found the character to be "completely fascinating". He chose "In My Time of Dying" as the second best episode of the series, mainly because of John's contributions, stating, "Even if you're not a huge fan of Poppa Winchester, I think it's impossible not to be moved by the final ten minutes of this episode... John's final speech to Dean, where he finally tells his son that he's proud of him, is one hell of a tear-jerker, and both Jeffrey Dean Morgan and Jensen Ackles knock that scene out of the park." Williams praised Matt Cohen's performance of a younger version of the character in the time-travel episode "In the Beginning", believing that he "did an excellent job at portraying a more innocent John Winchester than we've ever seen before".

Diana Steenbergen of IGN also criticized John for his lack of explanation, feeling that "it is not exactly easy to watch John treat Dean and Sam so dismissively, especially after they have been nearly killing themselves all season to find him". Steenbergen praised Morgan for his acting, writing, "Even though he is used sparingly throughout the series, Jeffrey Dean Morgan is always effective as John." She also felt that he brought "emotional weight" to the character, allowing the audience to "feel John's weariness, and his resignation that things will most likely not go well".

While Brian Tallerico of UGO enjoyed Morgan's performance, he was happy that the character was killed off because John's presence made Sam and Dean into "followers" that were "merely existing in the wake of their father". With their father gone, the brothers are no longer prevented from "heading up the battle with the other side".
