= Nicki Aycox =

American actress (1975–2022)

- Born: Nicki Lynn Aycox; May 26, 1975; Hennessey, Oklahoma, U.S.
- Died: November 16, 2022 (aged 47); Duarte, California, U.S.
- Occupations: Actress; musician
- Years active: 1995–2022
- Spouse: Matt Raab

Nicki Lynn Aycox (May 26, 1975 – November 16, 2022) was an American actress and musician, known for her roles in Supernatural, Cold Case, Jeepers Creepers 2, Perfect Stranger and The X-Files: I Want to Believe. She released her debut EP, Red Velvet Room, in 2015.

== Early life ==
Aycox was born in Hennessey, Oklahoma. As a child, Aycox enjoyed singing and playing the piano.

== Career ==
Aycox's early acting appearances included 3rd Rock from the Sun, USA High, Boy Meets World, The X-Files and a recurring role in Providence.

In 2003, Aycox played Minxie Hayes, a psychic cheerleader, in Jeepers Creepers 2. It was the sequel to the 2001 horror film Jeepers Creepers. From July to October 2005, Aycox portrayed Private Brenda "Mrs. B" Mitchell on Over There. The series followed a unit of the United States Army's 3rd Infantry Division on its first tour of duty in occupied Iraq and chronicled the war's effects on the soldiers' families in the United States.

In 2006, Aycox guest starred in Criminal Minds as Amber Canardo, a sociopathic serial killer, in the episode "The Perfect Storm". That same year, she portrayed Meg Masters, a recurring antagonist, in the first season of the WB (now CW) series Supernatural. Executive producer Kim Manners had previously worked with Aycox in an episode of Over There that he directed, and hand-selected her for the role of Meg.

I think that when you bring a woman on that's going to be a powerful character, there's definitely going to be some sexuality put into the character. I added a lot of it on my own, but it was definitely in the script as well.

— Aycox on developing Meg for Supernatural, Supernatural: The Official Companion Season 1, p. 140

In 2007, Aycox appeared in the thriller film Perfect Stranger, alongside Halle Berry and Bruce Willis, as a woman trying to blackmail a wealthy advertising executive. The following year, Aycox was in The X-Files: I Want to Believe, the second feature film installment of The X-Files franchise. Filming began in December 2007 and finished on March 11, 2008. In the same year, Aycox starred in Joy Ride 2: Dead Ahead, the sequel to 2001's Joy Ride.

In July 2009, Aycox began to portray the character Jaimie Allen (an undercover LAPD police officer) in the TNT action/drama series Dark Blue. It ended its run-on September 15, 2010. Her final acting role was in the 2014 film Dead on Campus.

In 2015, Aycox released her debut EP, Red Velvet Room, which contained five songs of her own original music.

== Personal life and death ==
In a March 2021 Instagram post, Aycox revealed that she had been diagnosed with leukemia. She died from the disease on November 16, 2022, at the age of 47, while receiving treatment at City of Hope National Medical Center in Duarte, California.

Tributes were paid by Supernatural creator Eric Kripke, and by actors on the show, including Jim Beaver, Mark Pellegrino, Rachel Miner and Richard Speight Jr.

A tribute to Aycox and other late cast and crew of The X-Files was made in the end credits of the 2026 director's cut The X-Files: I Want to Believe – Vrach Frankenshteyn.

Aycox was married to Matt Raab.

== Filmography ==
=== Film ===
Year	Title	Role	Notes
1997	Defying Gravity	Gretchen	
1999	The Dogwalker	Susan	
2000	Crime and Punishment in Suburbia	Cecil	
2001	Rave Macbeth	Lidia	
2002	Slap Her... She's French	Tanner Jennings	
2003	Jeepers Creepers 2	Minxie Hayes	
2004	Dead Birds	Annabelle	
2007	Perfect Stranger	Grace	
2008	The X-Files: I Want to Believe	Cheryl Cunningham	
2008	Joy Ride 2: Dead Ahead	Melissa Scott	Direct to video
2008	Animals	Nora	
2009	Tom Cool	Bridget	
2010	Christina	Christina Vogel	
2010	Lifted	Lisa Matthews	
2011	Ticking Clock	Polly	Direct to video
2013	The Girl on the Train	Lexi	
2013	The Employer	Maggie Jordan	
2026	The X-Files: I Want to Believe – Vrach Frankenshteyn	Cheryl Cunningham	Posthumous release; final film role, dedicated in memory

=== Television ===
Year	Title	Role	Notes
1996	Weird Science	Tammy	Episode: "Community Property"
1997	L.A. Heat	Betty Joe	Episode: "Rage"
1997	3rd Rock from the Sun	Alyson	Episode: "I Brake for Dick"
1997	USA High	Katherine Hanley	2 episodes
1997	Boy Meets World	Jennifer	Episode: "Fraternity Row"
1998	Significant Others	Brittany	2 episodes
1999	Providence	Lily Gallagher	Recurring role (7 episodes)
1999	Cruel Justice	Amy Metcalf	Television film
1999	Ally McBeal	Kim Puckett	Episode: "Seeing Green"
1999	The X-Files	Chastity Raines	Episode: "Rush"
2000	Opposite Sex	Joely	Episode: "The Homosexual Episode"
2001	Dark Angel	Syl	Episode: "... and Jesus Brought a Casserole"
2001	CSI: Crime Scene Investigation	Ellie Brass	Episode: "Ellie"
2002	Family Law	Patty Michel	Episode: "Children of a Lesser Dad"
2002	The Twilight Zone	Ricki	Episode: "Sanctuary"
2002–2004	Ed	Stella Vessey	Recurring role (6 episodes)
2003	Momentum	Tristen Geiger	Television film
2004	Las Vegas	Tammi Campbell	Episode: "You Can't Take It with You"
2004	LAX	Christine	Episode: "Secret Santa"
2004–2010	Cold Case	Christina Rush	Recurring role (12 episodes)
2005	LAX	Christine	Episodes: "Cease & Assist," "Mixed Signals"
2005	Over There	Pvt. Brenda "Mrs. B." Mitchell	Main role (11 episodes)
2006	Criminal Minds	Amber Canardo	Episode: "The Perfect Storm"
2006; 2008	Supernatural	Meg Masters	Recurring role (season 1); Guest role (season 4); 5 episodes
2007	John from Cincinnati	Jane	Episode: "His Visit: Day Six"
2008	Law & Order	Kate Westwood	Episode: "Bogeyman"
2008	CSI: Miami	Molly Reston	Episode: "The DeLuca Motel"
2009–2010	Dark Blue	Jamie Allen	Main role (20 episodes)
2011	Beyond the Blackboard	Candy	Television film
2012	BlackBoxTV	Stiletto	Episode: "AEZP: Execution Style"
2013	Profile for Murder	Jackie	Television film
2013	Longmire	Helen	Episode: "Unquiet Mind"
2013	The Glades	Diane	Episode: "Happy Trails"
2014	Dead on Campus	Danielle Williams	Television film; Final television role

== Discography ==
Extended plays

- Red Velvet Room (2015)
