= Sean Faris =

American actor (born 1982)

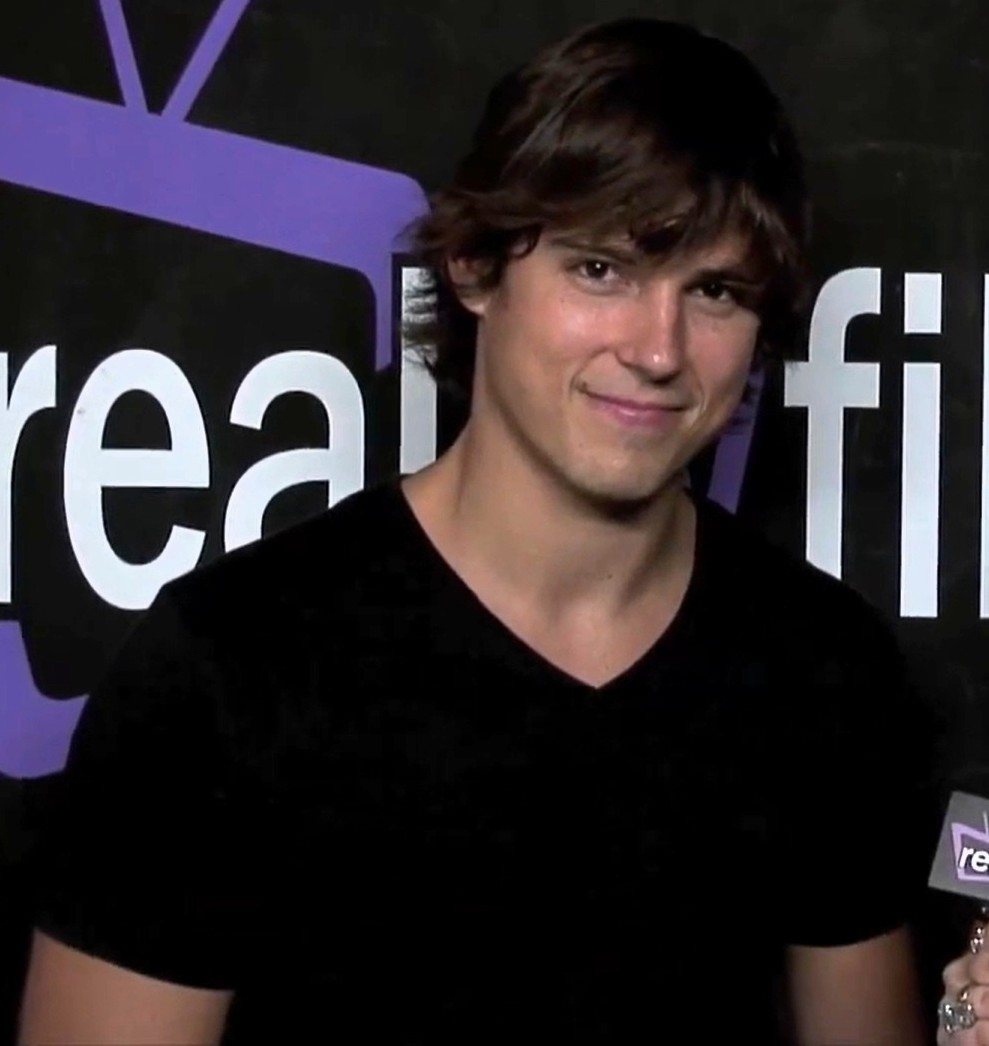
- Faris in 2009
- Born: March 25, 1982 (age 44); Houston, Texas, U.S.
- Occupation: Actor
- Years active: 2001–present
- Spouse: Cherie Daly (m. 2017)
- Children: 1

Sean Faris (born March 25, 1982) is an American actor. He is known for his roles as Jake Tyler in Never Back Down, Kyo Kusanagi in The King of Fighters, and Rick Penning in Forever Strong. He also played Tom in Ghost Machine.

== Early life ==
Faris was born on March 25, 1982, in Houston, Texas, the son of Katherine and Warren Stephen Faris. His family was working-class and lived in a small house in Houston; he moved to Ohio at age 12, where he attended Padua Franciscan High School in Parma and Barbizon Modeling and Acting School in Cleveland. In 1999, Faris competed at the International Model and Talent Association.

== Career ==
Faris has starred in many different projects, including two television shows, Life as We Know It, and Reunion, both canceled before the end of their first season. He also played William Beardsley in Yours, Mine & Ours. Faris also appeared in Sleepover with Alexa Vega in 2004. Faris was also nominated for the Young Actors Award at the 7th Annual Young Hollywood Awards in 2004. In 2007, Faris returned to work on three back-to-back films, Forever Strong, Never Back Down, and Brooklyn to Manhattan. Never Back Down was released on March 14, 2008, with the other two films also opening in 2008.

In 2008, he produced and starred in a short film called Manifest Destiny. In 2010, Faris appeared in three episodes of the TV show The Vampire Diaries. He also appeared on the cover of the January/February issue of U.S. Men's Health Magazine, and was the highest selling issue of the magazine in 2010. In early 2011, he co-starred in the CBS film The Lost Valentine, opposite Betty White and Jennifer Love Hewitt. On March 22, 2013, it was announced that Faris would portray Pennsylvania State Police Officer Gabriel Holbrook on Pretty Little Liars.

In 2011, Faris voiced the character Jack Rourke in the 2011 video game Need for Speed: The Run. On February 25, 2014, it was reported that Faris had landed one of the lead roles in Supernatural: Bloodlines, a spin-off of the CW series Supernatural, with the twentieth episode of the latter's ninth season airing as a backdoor pilot. However, the pilot was not picked up.

== Personal life ==
On September 5, 2017, Faris and actress Cherie Daly (also known as Cherie Jimenez) announced that they had married during that year's Burning Man festivities. In November 2021, they announced on Instagram that they were expecting their first child.

== Filmography ==
=== Film ===
Year	Title	Role	Notes
2001	Twisted	Fernando Castillo	
2001	Pearl Harbor	Danny's gunner	
2001	The Brotherhood II	John Van Owen	Direct-to-video film
2004	Sleepover	Steve Phillips	
2005	Yours, Mine & Ours	William Beardsley	
2008	Manifest Destiny	Josh	Short film
2008	Never Back Down	Jake Tyler	
2008	Forever Strong	Rick Penning	
2009	Ghost Machine	Tom	
2010	The King of Fighters	Kyo Kusanagi	
2011	Freerunner	Ryan	Also executive producer
2012	The Truth in Being Right	Jake	Short film; also executive producer and producer
2012	Stash House	David Nash	
2013	Lost for Words	Michael	Also executive producer
2013	Pawn	Nick	
2013	NYC Underground	Logan	Direct-to-video film
2015	The App	Vic Becklett	
2015	Adulterers	Samuel	originally titled Avouterie
2016	Female Fight Club	Potter	
2017	Gangster Land	Jack McGurn	also known as In the Absence of Good Men
2017	Surprise Me!	Jeff Bachmann	
2019	Munchausen by Internet	Todd	
2019	I Am Not for Sale: The Fight to End Human Trafficking	Michael	
2020	Algorithm: Bliss	Vic	
2022	The Bay House	Cam Brooks	
2023	Sparkle: A Unicorn Tale	Karl	
2023	A Gettysburg Christmas	Nick	

=== Television ===
Year	Title	Role	Notes
2001	Undressed	Darren	4 episodes
2002	Even Stevens	Scott Brooks	Episode: "Where in the World Is Pookie Stevens?"
2002	House Blend	Chris Reed	Unsold television pilot
2002	Maybe It's Me	N/A	Episode: "The Prom Episode: Part 2"
2002	Smallville	Byron Moore	Episode: "Nocturne"
2003	Eve	Chip	Episode: "Player Down"
2003	One Tree Hill	High school guy	Episode: "The Search for Something More"
2004	Boston Public	Troy Mooney	Episode: "Chapter Seventy-Nine"
2004–2005	Life as We Know It	Dino Whitman	Main role
2005	Reunion	Craig Brewster	Main role
2010	The Vampire Diaries	Ben McKittrick	3 episodes
2011	Leverage	Shelley	2 episodes
2011	The Lost Valentine	Lucas Thomas	Television film
2012	Christmas with Holly	Mark Nagle	Television film
2013–2015	Pretty Little Liars	Gabriel Holbrook	Recurring role (seasons 4–5); 15 episodes
2014	Supernatural	Julian Duval	Episode: "Bloodlines" (Note: Backdoor pilot for Supernatural: Bloodlines)
2016	White Hot	Beck Merchant	Television film; also known as Sandra Brown's White Hot
2017	An Uncommon Grace	Levi	Television film
2017	The Joneses Unplugged	Matthew Jones	Television film
2018	A Veterans Christmas	Joe Peterson	Television film
2019	Psycho Nanny	Todd	Television film; also known as Munchausen by Internet

=== Video games ===
Year	Title	Role	Notes
2011	Need for Speed: The Run	Jack Rourke	Voice role

== Awards and nominations ==
Year	Award	Category	Work	Result	Refs
2005	Young Artist Award	Best Performance in a Feature Film – Young Ensemble Cast	Sleepover	Nominated	
2007	Young Hollywood Award	The One to Watch	Himself	Won	
2008	MTV Movie Award	Best Fight (shared with Cam Gigandet)	Never Back Down	Won	
