= Stephen Martines =

American actor

- Other name: Coltin Scott
- Years active: 1998-present

Stephen Martines is an American actor, recording artist and athlete.

Martines has appeared in several television shows, including Burn Notice, General Hospital, Guiding Light, Monarch Cove, The Closer and The Vampire Diaries.

== Filmography ==
=== Film ===
| Year | Film | Role | Notes |
|---|---|---|---|
| 1998 | Kraa! The Sea Monster | Captain Ruric | |
| 1999 | Justice | Juan Jr. | TV movie |
| 1999 | This Is the Disk-O-Boyz | Indy-Lee Wong | |
| 1999 | Planet Patrol | | Video |
| 2004 | Ring of Darkness | Shawn | TV movie |
| 2008 | No Man's Land: The Rise of Reeker | Alex | |
| 2011 | Mud Dog Blues | | |

=== Television ===
| Year | Film | Role | Notes |
|---|---|---|---|
| 1998 | Pacific Blue | Patrick Benton | Thrill Week |
| 1999–2003 | General Hospital | Nikolas Cassadine | |
| 2003, 2005 | Guiding Light | Antonio 'Tony' Santos | |
| 2006 | Monarch Cove | Parker Elian | 14 episodes |
| 2008 | Fear Itself | Diego | The Sacrifice |
| 2008 | The Closer | Ricardo Ramos | 2008–2009 |
| 2009 | Bones | Alex Pina | Fire in the Ice |
| 2009 | CSI: Miami | Jeff Peralta | Smoke Gets in Your CSIs |
| 2010 | The Vampire Diaries | Frederick | 2 episodes |
| 2013 | The Mentalist | Jacob Lettner | Red, White and Blue |
| 2013 | Burn Notice | Carlos Cruz | |
| 2014 | Supernatural | Det. Freddie Costa | "Bloodlines" |
