= Supernatural season 9 =

Supernatural
- Season 9
- DVD cover art
- Showrunner: Jeremy Carver
- Starring: Jared Padalecki; Jensen Ackles; Misha Collins
- No. of episodes: 23

Release
- Original network: The CW
- Original release: October 8, 2013 – May 20, 2014

Season chronology
- ← Previous; Season 8 Next → Season 10

The ninth season of Supernatural, an American dark fantasy television series created by Eric Kripke, premiered on October 8, 2013, concluded on May 20, 2014, and contained 23 episodes. This is the second season with Jeremy Carver as showrunner. The season was released on DVD and Blu-ray in region 1 on September 9, 2014, in region 2 on June 8, 2015, and in region 4 on October 8, 2014. The ninth season had an average viewership of 2.19 million U.S. viewers. The season follows Dean and Sam as they try to stop a revived Abaddon, a Knight of Hell, and have to use a cursed object called The First Blade to do so. Meanwhile, Metatron closes off heaven and causes the angels to fall, and Castiel will stop at nothing to kill him.

== Cast ==
=== Starring ===
- Jared Padalecki as Sam Winchester / Gadreel
- Jensen Ackles as Dean Winchester
- Misha Collins as Castiel (Note: Only credited for his respective episode appearances.)

=== Special guest stars ===
- DJ Qualls as Garth Fitzgerald IV
- Jim Beaver as Bobby Singer
- Leslie Jordan as the voice of Yorkie
- Nicole "Snooki" Polizzi as Herself / Crossroads Demon

=== Guest stars ===
- Mark A. Sheppard as Crowley
- Tahmoh Penikett as Gadreel
- Curtis Armstrong as Metatron
- Alaina Huffman as Abaddon / Josie Sands
- Osric Chau as Kevin Tran
- Erica Carroll as Hannah
- Adam Harrington as Bartholomew
- Kim Rhodes as Sheriff Jody Mills
- A. J. Buckley as Ed Zeddmore
- Briana Buckmaster as Sheriff Donna Hanscum
- Felicia Day as Charlie Bradbury
- Lindsey McKeon as Tessa
- Gil McKinney as Henry Winchester
- Timothy Omundson as Cain
- Julian Richings as Death
- Richard Speight Jr. as Gabriel
- Lauren Tom as Linda Tran
- Travis Wester as Harry Spangler
- Katherine Ramdeen as Alex Jones

== Episodes ==
No. overall	No. in season	Title	Directed by	Written by	Original release date	Prod. code	U.S. viewers (millions)
173	1	"I Think I'm Gonna Like It Here"	John F. Showalter	Jeremy Carver	October 8, 2013	4X5052	2.59
Sam Winchester (Jared Padalecki) is dying from the events of the previous season. He dreams that he's talking with his brother Dean (Jensen Ackles), who is trying to convince him to fight to live, and their late friend Bobby Singer (Jim Beaver), who is trying to convince him to let go and die. Sam decides to follow "Bobby's" advice and crosses paths with Death himself (Julian Richings) again. Death explains that he has come to pay Sam the honor of reaping him personally, and Sam agrees to go with him so long as his death is permanent this time in attempt to prevent the suffering and death his and Dean's resurrections have caused in the past. Meanwhile, the angel Castiel (Misha Collins) has been turned into a human. He meets another angel, who is later revealed to have plans to possess him, as the body she is in now is deteriorating due to its inability to contain her. Castiel kills her to prevent her going through with her threat of disclosing his location to other angels, who seek revenge on him for locking them out of Heaven. Not knowing this, an increasingly desperate Dean prays to angels for help in saving Sam's life; this causes them to come attack Dean. However, one angel, Ezekiel (Tahmoh Penikett), has come to answer Dean's prayers. Due to the extensive damage wrought on Sam's body, he finds that he is unable to heal Sam with a touch as angels normally can. As he has been injured in the fall from Heaven, he suggests that he possesses Sam so he can heal him from the inside while at the same time healing himself. Dean agrees to this, and Ezekiel takes on Dean's form to talk to Sam in his head, using Dean's appearance and ambiguous wording to trick Sam into letting Ezekiel possess him. With Dean's agreement, Ezekiel erases Sam's memory of the event and stays hidden in Sam while secretly healing him.
174	2	"Devil May Care"	Guy Norman Bee	Andrew Dabb	October 15, 2013	4X5051	2.33
Sam and Dean take the captive King of Hell Crowley (Mark A. Sheppard) to the Men of Letters bunker to try to get the locations of all the demons on Earth from him. Meanwhile, his demonic rival Abaddon (Alaina Huffman) starts a movement to take over Hell. With the help of three demons that take sailors as hosts, Abaddon captures two hunters and uses them to lure Sam and Dean into a trap outside Eugene, Oregon. Ezekiel briefly takes control of Sam and kills the three demons, causing Abaddon to flee. Sam continues to be unaware of his possession, as Ezekiel made it look like Dean killed the demons. The Winchesters' prophet ally Kevin Tran (Osric Chau) searches for a way to reverse Metatron's spell and kill Abaddon. He confronts Crowley, who claims that Kevin's mother Linda isn't dead. Kevin tries to leave the bunker to find Linda himself, but Dean convinces him not to go by telling him that he's family and that even if his mother is alive, she is as good as dead.
175	3	"I'm No Angel"	Kevin Hooks	Brad Buckner & Eugenie Ross-Leming	October 22, 2013	4X5053	2.34
An angel faction led by Bartholomew (Adam Harrington) uses an internet preacher to encourage devout people to agree to being possessed by the multitude of fallen angels now wandering the earth. Bartholomew is also actively hunting for Castiel, who is out on his own and struggling to find any stable shelter and food. Increasingly desperate, Castiel meets April Kelly (Shannon Lucio), who offers him food, takes him into her home, and tends to him, leading to them having sex. The morning after, however, April reveals herself to be a rogue reaper hired by Bartholomew to find him. After torturing Castiel for information on Metatron, she kills him when Sam and Dean arrive to rescue him. Dean kills her in retribution and has Ezekiel resurrect Castiel, lying to the others by saying that he had tricked April into resurrecting Castiel before he killed her. Castiel is relieved to finally have a place to stay at the bunker with his friends, but Ezekiel, fearing that Castiel will draw angry angels to them, forces Dean to kick Castiel out.
176	4	"Slumber Party"	Robert Singer	Robbie Thompson	October 29, 2013	4X5054	2.19
In 1935, hunter Dorothy (Tiio Horn) of The Wizard of Oz fame captures the Wicked Witch of the West (Maya Massar) and brings her to the Men of Letters bunker. Unable to find a way to kill her, Dorothy traps herself and the Witch inside a jar. In the present, Sam and Dean discover that the bunker's map table is connected to an ancient computer. They call in their tech-savvy friend Charlie Bradbury (Felicia Day) in the hopes that she can rewire the computer to track the fallen angels, but while they're in the room containing the computer, Dean accidentally releases Dorothy and the Witch. The four hunters work together to stop the Witch's plan to use a key to Oz somewhere in the bunker to bring her minions in Oz to the human world. Dean recognizes the key from his sorting through the bunker's artifacts, but the Witch takes advantage of his knowledge to steal it for herself and begin opening the door to Oz. The witch kills Charlie but Dean forces Ezekiel to bring her back, still hiding everything from Sam. She puts Sam and Dean under her control to find the girls and kill them. Charlie figures out that the Oz books held clues from Man of Letters L. Frank Baum to Dorothy—his daughter—on how to defeat the Witch. After Charlie stabs the Witch to death using the pointed heel of the ruby slippers—thus freeing Sam and Dean from the Witch's control—Dorothy uses the key to return to Oz and free it from the evil forces. Charlie takes her up on her invitation to go with her, as she has been longing for fantastical adventures of that kind ever since she became a hunter.
177	5	"Dog Dean Afternoon"	Tim Andrew	Eric Charmelo & Nicole Snyder	November 5, 2013	4X5056	2.15
A taxidermist (Forbes Angus) in Enid, Oklahoma is constricted to death by a man with snake-like traits, and a shelter worker (Kris Neufeld) is killed by the same man but now with cat-like traits after eating a cat whole. Sam and Dean investigate and find the taxidermist's dog, Colonel, who witnessed both murders. Dean casts a spell that allows him to communicate with animals but causes him to take on dog-like traits. They question Colonel (voiced by Al Rodrigo) and various other animals, discovering that the killer is a man named Chef Leo (Steve Valentine) who is using shamanism to take on the traits of various animals by eating them. Chef Leo attacks and mortally wounds Sam, but Sam quickly recovers due to Ezekiel healing him. Chef Leo witnesses this and captures Sam. Chef Leo has been trying to find a way to cure his cancer by gaining the abilities of different animals, and now he hopes to acquire Sam's healing power by eating him. Dean calls a pack of dogs to maul Chef Leo to death. Dean takes Colonel to a new home with loving owners and the spell wears off right before Colonel is about to tell Dean the real reason dogs exist, returning him to normal.
178	6	"Heaven Can't Wait"	Rob Spera	Robert Berens	November 12, 2013	4X5057	2.36
Four people mysteriously combust in Rexburg, Idaho, where Castiel is working as a sales associate at a gas station. He calls Dean, who leaves Sam and Kevin at the bunker doing research, to investigate with Castiel. They visit the crime scene of the newest victim, and Castiel recognizes it as the work of a Rit Zien, a class of angel healers who are able to mercy-kill mortally wounded angels. Unable to differentiate between the temporary and permanent pains of humans, the Rit Zien has been killing those suffering from any distress. Castiel leaves the investigation to go to his boss's house, thinking she'd asked him for a date, but finds that she'd actually wanted him to babysit her infant daughter. There, Castiel is attacked by the Rit Zien angel Ephraim (Ashton Holmes), who heard his inner pain and is there to kill him. With Dean's assistance, Castiel kills the Rit Zien instead. Dean then leaves Castiel to his normal life. At the bunker, Kevin is only able to translate the angel tablet into an obscure form of cuneiform. Sam and Kevin make a deal with Crowley: in exchange for allowing him to contact Abaddon with a blood spell, he will translate the tablet for them. After communicating with Abaddon and having her tell him that she has seized control of Hell and is stamping out all his work and followers to remove his influence, a subdued Crowley translates the tablet for Sam and Kevin and tells them that Metatron's spell is irreversible. Later, Sam catches Crowley injecting himself with Kevin's blood for an unknown reason.
179	7	"Bad Boys"	Kevin Parks	Adam Glass	November 19, 2013	4X5055	2.01
Dean gets a call from Sonny (Blake Gibbons), an old friend who runs a reform school in Hurleyville, New York, asking for his help when a man is mysteriously killed at the school. Sam learns that Dean (Dylan Everett in flashbacks) spent two months at the school in 1995 after he got caught stealing food. Instead of it being a hard time for Dean, he enjoyed it and flourished, along the way having his first romance with a girl named Robin (Sarah Desjardins). On the night of a school dance, Dean's father returned to collect him and, despite Sonny's offer to let him stay permanently, Dean elects to leave to reunite with Sam (Hunter Dillon in flashbacks). In the present, Dean meets up with Robin (Erin Karpluk) again, though she initially pretends not to recognize him out of hurt that he had abandoned her without a word back then. They eventually patch things up. Sam and Dean go to the reform school, where they talk with a boy named Timmy (Sean Michael Kyer), whose mother is a ghost who has been protecting him from perceived threats at the cost of going murderously insane from being tied to Earth. She tries to kill Sam, Dean, and Robin, but is stopped by Timmy with Dean's encouragement. Timmy tells his mother to move on and she listens to her son, returning to her normal self as she departs.
180	8	"Rock and a Hard Place"	John MacCarthy	Jenny Klein	November 26, 2013	4X5058	2.39
Suspecting that the mysterious disappearances she is investigating in Hartford, South Dakota, are linked to the supernatural due to unusual reports she is getting, Sheriff Jody Mills (Kim Rhodes) calls in Sam and Dean to help her with the case. Sam and Dean realize that the victims all belong to the same church chastity group and so go undercover as new members to continue investigating. Dean discovers that the group counselor, Suzy Lee (Susie Abromeit), is one of his favorite porn stars; unhappy with her old life, she has quit the porn industry and is trying to turn over a new leaf. Wooing her with his genuine admiration for her and her work, he seduces her at the same time that Sam and Sheriff Mills realize that the people taken are members of the chastity group who have broken their vows of chastity. Before Sam and Sheriff Mills can get to them, Dean and Suzy are kidnapped and imprisoned in an old fallout shelter where the rest of the victims are being kept (save one who has already been taken away). Dean manages to call Sam and though the call cuts out quickly, the sound of a train whistle in the background clues Sam and Sheriff Mills in to Dean's location. They also deduce that they are dealing with the goddess Vesta (Lindy Booth), who has been posing as a member of the chastity group to select her victims. Sheriff Mills manages to kill Vesta and she, Sam, and Dean (who breaks free of confinement) rescue the surviving victims. However, Sam remains troubled by Vesta's words about him barely being kept alive. Seeing his brother's distress, Dean is about to tell him the truth, but Ezekiel reemerges and warns him not to.
181	9	"Holy Terror"	Thomas J. Wright	Eugenie Ross-Leming & Brad Buckner	December 3, 2013	4X5059	2.42
A civil war starts between angels working for Bartholomew and angels working for Malachi, an anarchist, both of whom want to rule the fallen angels, which will end in disaster. Sam and Dean initially investigate with Castiel, but Ezekiel makes Dean send Castiel away. Desperate, Castiel prays for help and is met by an angel named Muriel who is neutral in the war. Castiel convinces her to hear him out and she explains what she knows, but he is captured by Malachi and another angel named Theo who were tracking Muriel. Malachi tortures Castiel for information on Metatron, killing Muriel to try to force him to tell him what he knows. He reveals that many angels died in the Fall from Heaven, including Ezekiel. Malachi leaves Castiel alone with Theo who wants to defect to Metatron's side. Castiel tricks Theo into releasing him, then steals his grace, turning him back into an angel and at least partially restoring his powers. After escaping, Castiel calls Dean to warn him about "Ezekiel." At the same time, Metatron (Curtis Armstrong) meets with "Ezekiel," who is revealed to actually be Gadreel, the appointed guardian of the Garden of Eden until he let Lucifer in and fell into disgrace in the eyes of the Heavenly Host. He was imprisoned in Heaven's dungeon for not stopping Lucifer and was only released by the Fall. Metatron, having grown bored with his solitary rule of Heaven, proposes working together to restore Heaven with angels that they like. Gadreel is initially reluctant, but agrees and is given orders by Metatron to kill Kevin to prove his allegiance. After learning the truth from Castiel, Dean uses a sigil to knock Gadreel out so that he can tell Sam the truth, but "Sam" knocks him out and reveals himself to really be Gadreel, having altered the sigil so it gave him control rather than Sam. Gadreel kills Kevin and leaves, taking with him the angel and demon tablets, but leaves Dean alive to mourn the loss of Kevin and Sam.
182	10	"Road Trip"	Robert Singer	Andrew Dabb	January 14, 2014	4X5060	2.21
Metatron orders Gadreel to carry out two more murders, including an old friend of Gadreel's (Dan Payne). Though Gadreel hesitates to kill his friend, he goes through with it in the end. Back at the bunker, Castiel informs Dean that Crowley can bypass the angel and help them talk directly with Sam, who can then cast Gadreel out. After they find and capture Gadreel, he proves immune to Crowley's methods of torture, so Dean reluctantly agrees to allow Crowley to possess Sam to communicate with him directly. With Crowley's encouragement, Sam manages to expel Gadreel who repossesses his old vessel to continue his work for Metatron. Abaddon, having tracked them down, arrives. Crowley stays behind to hold her off while Sam, Dean and Castiel escape. Crowley tells Abaddon that rather than the bloody battle between the two of them she has been anticipating, they are in the middle of a "campaign" to win the hearts of their demonic subjects for rulership of Hell. He then leaves before Abaddon can attack him. Meanwhile, it is discovered that Gadreel has restored enough of Sam's health that Castiel can take over healing him through conventional means. Dean tells Sam that he is going to hunt Gadreel alone as he believes that he causes too much hurt to those around him. Hurt by Dean's trickery, Sam tells him that Gadreel is not their problem, but refuses to elaborate, instead bidding Dean to go.
183	11	"First Born"	John Badham	Robbie Thompson	January 21, 2014	4X5061	2.65
Crowley approaches Dean for help with finding the First Blade, the only known weapon that can kill Abaddon. Following clues, Dean and Crowley discover that Dean's father had once worked with a hunter named Tara who spent years searching for the Blade. Finding Tara, they cast a locator spell she found that leads them to the "retired" demon Cain (Timothy Omundson), who had trained—and then killed—all the other Knights of Hell except Abaddon, who had escaped his wrath. Cain refuses to help them, even letting in a group of other demons to fight Dean and Crowley, who kill them. Cain reveals that he wants revenge on Abaddon, as she murdered his wife, but is unable to exact it himself because he is bound by his promise to his wife not to kill anymore. Cain also reveals that the spell led them to him because his Mark (the brand Lucifer marked him with when he turned him into a demon) is the source of the Blade's power, and he can transfer it to someone worthy. Despite Cain's warnings of an unknown but terrible cost, Dean agrees to bear the Mark so that he can kill Abaddon. Cain asks for Dean to kill him after killing Abaddon, then sends Dean and Crowley to safety as he single-handedly defeats a swarm of demons that arrived to kill them. Having picked up on Crowley giving himself away in small but tell-tale ways, Dean confronts Crowley on having been deceiving and manipulating him all along. This includes Crowley having allowed Tara to be questioned, tortured, and killed by demons so that they would find him and Dean, who could prove himself worthy to Cain for the Mark. However, Dean can't retaliate against Crowley yet because he still needs Crowley to retrieve the First Blade from the bottom of the ocean. Running parallel to this plot is Sam and Castiel's attempts to harvest the part of Gadreel's grace that is still inside Sam, so that they can use it to track the angel. Removing the grace causes Sam to start reverting into the state he was before Gadreel possessed him, but Sam refuses to let him stop until they get all the grace they need, even if it means his death. Due to his own brief humanity, Castiel empathizes with Sam's desire to make up for the people who've died from the choices he, Sam, and Dean have made. However, he refuses to risk killing Sam, and instead finishes healing Sam and eliminates the last of the grace. The spell turns out to be unsuccessful because they didn't get enough grace. Castiel leaves to track Metatron, who he believes holds the key to fixing everything.
184	12	"Sharp Teeth"	John F. Showalter	Adam Glass	January 28, 2014	4X5062	2.76
After Garth (DJ Qualls) is hit by a car subsequent to mutilating a cow in Grantsburg, Wisconsin, Sam and Dean arrive separately to investigate where their friend has been for months. Claiming to remember nothing, Garth escapes the hospital, and Sam and Dean follow him to discover that Garth is married to a werewolf and is now one himself after being bitten six months before on a hunt. Garth insists that he and his pack don't harm humans and peacefully coexist. While Sam is more willing to trust Garth, Dean isn't after his long disappearance and due to his suspicious nature. As everything seems to be fine, Sam and Dean are lured into a trap by the local sheriff who is also a werewolf and are forced to kill him when he attacks. Looking for Garth, Sam finds him and his wife Bess missing, then he himself is kidnapped by a few members of the pack. Dean finds out that they worship Fenris and believe that when Ragnarok comes, they will rule over mankind. The wife of the minister plans to murder Garth and Bess and manipulates Sam to goad the rest of the pack (who is willing to live in peace) into action. Dean arrives and kills the three werewolves running the plot. In the aftermath, Garth offers to return to hunting using his new werewolf powers to help, but Dean tells him to enjoy his new life, having realized that not all werewolves are so bad. Dean tries to make up with Sam who agrees to return to hunting with Dean, but doesn't fully trust him anymore.
185	13	"The Purge"	Phil Sgriccia	Eric Charmelo & Nicole Snyder	February 4, 2014	4X5063	2.46
Sam and Dean go undercover at a health spa where people mysteriously lose a lot of weight very fast. While tasting the spa's pudding, Dean gets drugged by roofies and they realize the spa's owner, Maritza, is a monster after Dean catches her eating refrigerated fat. Maritza explains she and her brother Alonzo are Pishtaco, Peruvian parasitic monsters that feed on fat. Maritza set up the spa to feed harmlessly from her customers, but her brother wasn't content with that. Sam and Dean kill Alonzo and pass it off as a psycho serial killer to the police. Maritza agrees to return to Peru.
186	14	"Captives"	Jerry Wanek	Robert Berens	February 25, 2014	4X5064	2.12
To Sam and Dean's surprise, they are visited by Kevin's ghost; since his death, he has been trapped in the veil between worlds because spirits have been barred from Heaven by Metatron. Kevin has learned that his mother's alive and asks them to rescue her. Sam and Dean locate Linda (Lauren Tom) in a storage facility in Wichita, Kansas, but are captured by a demon there in the guise of a storage facility employee who is working for Crowley and keeping Linda prisoner. The three manage to break free and Linda gets the satisfaction of killing the demon herself. She is reunited with Kevin's ghost and, despite the risks, decides to take him home with her. Before they leave, Kevin asks Sam and Dean to set aside their issues. Despite promising him they will, they go back to ignoring each other when he's gone. Meanwhile, Castiel is captured by Bartholomew, revealed to be a former subordinate of his who wants Castiel to ally with him to unite all of the angels. However, Castiel doesn't agree with Bartholomew's savage ways and wants to bring an end to the in-fighting he's causing. In a fight, Castiel is forced to kill him in self-defense. Afterwards, some of Bartholomew's followers approach Castiel to join him in his way of doing things.
187	15	"#THINMAN"	Jeannot Szwarc	Jenny Klein	March 4, 2014	4X5066	1.93
In Springdale, Washington, a teenage girl taking pictures of herself is killed in her own bedroom by what appears to be Thinman, some kind of monster that appears in various videos and pictures of unnatural deaths. Sam and Dean find their old ghost hunting rivals Ed and Harry of the Ghostfacers are also there investigating, collecting more stories on Thinman. Sam and Dean are confused because the deaths don't seem related to the supernatural and the pictures seem faked, but then Thinman is caught on-camera murdering a diner manager. After Harry himself narrowly escapes Thinman, Ed confesses that he had invented Thinman to keep Harry from leaving to lead a normal life as their old teammates had, a revelation that infuriates the other man. Sam and Dean are taken captive by the local deputy, who reveals that he and his psychopathic partner-in-crime, a busboy who had killed his boss the diner manager and the girl for petty reasons, have been using Thinman as a cover to go on a killing spree, disguising themselves as Thinman and staging the murders as supernatural occurrences to make it seem that Thinman is real in order to feed the legend. They plan to have "Thinman" kill Sam and Dean next, but when Ed and Harry arrive, they get distracted, allowing Sam and Dean to break free and fight back; in the ensuing struggle, Dean kills the busboy and Harry is forced to kill the deputy to save Ed. Dean then covers up their involvement by staging the scene so it looks like the killers killed each other. At the end of the episode, Harry refuses to forgive Ed for his deception and leaves the Ghostfacers and Ed behind for good.
188	16	"Blade Runners"	Serge Ladouceur	Brad Buckner & Eugenie Ross-Leming	March 18, 2014	4X5065	1.86
Crowley is addicted to human blood, but after the demon he uses to get it betrays him to Abaddon, he calls in Sam and Dean. Crowley, Sam, and Dean team up to locate the First Blade which has passed among various owners since its discovery by an unmanned submarine in the Mariana Trench. Finally, they track the Blade to a rogue Man of Letters named Cuthbert Sinclair (Kavan Smith), who uses the Men of Letters alias 'Magnus'. Locating his lair, Sam and Dean learn that Magnus is a collector of creatures and rare objects such as the Blade and as he needs Dean to use the Blade, he imprisons him and sends Sam away. Sam and Crowley manage to get back in, but Sam is captured. Crowley frees Dean who kills Magnus with the First Blade, after which Sam realizes the Blade is having a strange effect on Dean. Crowley then takes the Blade as he doesn't trust Sam and Dean not to kill him and will only give it back to them once they have tracked down Abaddon.
189	17	"Mother's Little Helper"	Misha Collins	Adam Glass	March 25, 2014	4X5067	2.25
As Dean takes a break from researching Abaddon to visit a dive bar, he is pestered there by Crowley. Meanwhile, Sam opts to go investigate a report of the good people of Milton, Illinois spontaneously turning into violent killers. He meets ex-nun Julia Wilkinson (Jenny O'Hara) who had encountered the Men of Letters under similar circumstances in 1958. She reveals that Abaddon had been present at her convent and removing people's souls before encountering Henry Winchester (Gil McKinney) and Josie Sands (Alaina Huffman) of the Men of Letters. When Abaddon was about to possess Henry, Josie persuaded Abaddon to take her instead. Abaddon left with an oblivious Henry with the intention of studying the Men of Letters from within before destroying them. Now she has demons working for her stealing souls again in order to turn those souls into an army of demons. Sam kills the demon responsible for stealing souls in Milton and releases the captive souls to return to their bodies. Disturbed by Abaddon's plan, he is now as determined as Dean to stop her.
190	18	"Meta Fiction"	Thomas J. Wright	Robbie Thompson	April 15, 2014	4X5068	1.60
In Ogden, Utah, several angels have been slaughtered for refusing to join Metatron, who claims he can get them back into Heaven. Several angels want Castiel to lead them against him, but Castiel refuses. Castiel is approached by Gabriel, who says he survived and came out of hiding to be the leader against Metatron. Castiel realizes this is an illusion created by Metatron. Metatron views the whole angel war as a story and wants Castiel to play the villain by leading angels against him. Metatron claims that Castiel will fail, but he will let him back into Heaven and give him a power supply for his new grace which will otherwise soon kill him. Sam and Dean capture Gadreel, and while Dean is alone with him, Gadreel goads him about what Sam really thinks of him. Dean is heavily tempted by the Mark of Cain to kill him, but is just barely able to resist the urge. Metatron tells Sam he will trade Castiel for Gadreel. At the trade, Metatron easily puts out holy fire and erases angel warding. He says Sam and Dean cannot stop him, but it will be fun watching them try, as he departs with Gadreel. Castiel seems to somberly accept the mantle of leader of a group of angels as Metatron had wanted.
191	19	"Alex Annie Alexis Ann"	Stefan Pleszczynski	Robert Berens	April 22, 2014	4X5069	2.10
In Sioux Falls, South Dakota, a young woman named Alex (Katherine Ramdeen) is arrested, but while the police officers are gone she is attacked by a vampire who shows a familiarity to her. Sheriff Jody Mills (Kim Rhodes) kills the vampire and calls in Sam and Dean for help. They discover that Alex was kidnapped eight years ago by a "family" of vampires led by Celia (Ashley Crow) and that they are now after her as she ran away from them. Tracing the nest to O'Neill, Nebraska through a bus ticket, Sam and Dean confront one of the vampires, while Jody protects Alex. Before being killed, the vampire reveals that Alex lures humans to the nest for the vampires to feed on and is not innocent after all. Before Sam and Dean can reach them, the "family" attacks Jody and Alex. They kidnap Alex, who is revealed to have run away out of guilt over her actions. Returning to the nest to kill the vampires, Sam, Dean and Jody are captured, and Jody finds Alex turned into a vampire. Jody realizes Celia kidnapped Alex to replace a daughter she'd lost a long time ago. She admits that she herself sees Alex as a way to cope with her own dead family. Alex saves Jody from Celia, who Jody then kills. At the same time, Dean breaks free and kills the other two vampires, but he shows pleasure in doing it, which disturbs Sam. As Alex has not fed, Sam and Dean are able to cure her. Jody decides to take care of Alex as long as she needs her as they can relate, both having lost their entire families.
192	20	"Bloodlines"	Robert Singer	Andrew Dabb	April 29, 2014	4X5070	2.03
In this back-door pilot for a proposed new TV series (Supernatural: Bloodlines), five different mafia-esque monster families are running the underbelly of Chicago, Illinois. One is a family of shapeshifters run by Margo Lassiter, whose leadership is thrown into question when her younger brother David returns home to claim his place in the family business. The other reigning family in town is made up of werewolves, led by Julian Duval. The Families' paths cross with Sam and Dean when they meet novice hunter Ennis, a man with a personal vendetta against the monsters when his girlfriend is murdered by a mysterious figure with silver claws who kills David's brother, Sal.
193	21	"King of the Damned"	P. J. Pesce	Eugenie Ross-Leming & Brad Buckner	May 6, 2014	4X5071	1.59
Castiel calls Sam and Dean in to interrogate one of Metatron's followers (Gordon Michael Woolvett). Sam and Dean are able to trick the prisoner into revealing that Metatron has a secret portal into Heaven for his followers and is amassing an elite ground force for an unknown reason. Before they can get more out of him, however, he is assassinated by a spy in Castiel's ranks. In response, Castiel meets with Gadreel (Tahmoh Penikett) to discuss him becoming a spy for his faction. Castiel is ambushed at the meeting, but Gadreel insists he had nothing to do with it. Castiel attempts to convince Gadreel that he is fighting for the wrong side and that he should become Castiel's spy. At the same time, Abaddon (Alaina Huffman) travels back in time to 1723 and kidnaps Crowley's son Gavin to use as leverage against him. Crowley agrees to help Abaddon kill the Winchesters and leads them to where he has hidden the First Blade, but secretly warns Dean of the trap. After sending Sam on a wild goose chase, Dean confronts Abaddon alone and succeeds in killing her, with the Mark of Cain protecting him from her powers. The Winchesters allow Crowley to live, but he teleports Gavin away so he won't be returned to his own time to die. In the aftermath, Dean refuses to be parted from the First Blade, claiming that it grants him a calmness and strength despite Sam's worries of what it's doing to him.
194	22	"Stairway to Heaven"	Guy Norman Bee	Andrew Dabb	May 13, 2014	4X5072	1.74
In Dixon, Missouri, an angel blows himself up in Castiel's name, killing one of Metatron's angels and several humans. This causes several angels to doubt Castiel's leadership despite Castiel saying he would not order such attacks. Metatron's side is outnumbered so he meets with Tyrus, the leader of an independent faction of angels. Tyrus refuses to join him, saying if Metatron killed him the rest of his angels would join Castiel. Just then, another suicide bomber attacks Metatron and the blast kills Tyrus. Dean finds another bomber, who turns out to be the reaper Tessa (Lindsey McKeon). The other angels view Dean as a savage killer and insist he only talk to her for answers. Tessa says she was tormented by the pain from the human souls trapped on Earth since Heaven was closed; although she was too much of a coward to kill herself before, she will happily die for Castiel's cause. She then impales herself on the First Blade, making it look like Dean killed her. Metatron contacts Castiel's side, saying Tyrus's angels have joined him and Castiel does not care about the other angels, only winning the war before he dies when his new grace burns out. Metatron offers the rest of Castiel's angels amnesty if they join him now. The angels demand Castiel kill Dean to prove he is a worthy leader, but Castiel refuses, so all his angels abandon him for Metatron. Gadreel is disturbed to learn Metatron planned all this by brainwashing the suicide bombers into thinking they were dying for Castiel. Dean completely refuses to be separated from the First Blade even if it brings out an uncontrollable rage in him. Gadreel offers to tell Castiel and the Winchesters everything about Metatron to stop him, but Dean attacks Gadreel with the First Blade, forcing Sam and Castiel to restrain him.
195	23	"Do You Believe in Miracles?"	Thomas J. Wright	Jeremy Carver	May 20, 2014	4X5073	2.30
After Dean attacks Gadreel with the First Blade, Sam and Castiel lock him in the bunker's dungeon out of fear of what the Blade is doing to him. Gadreel reveals that Metatron intends to convert humanity into following him instead of God. As the power Metatron draws from the angel tablet makes him unstoppable, Gadreel and Castiel decide to infiltrate Heaven to break the tablet and his power, while Sam goes after Metatron himself. Dean summons Crowley, who helps him escape and start tracking down Metatron, but Dean has Crowley leave after Sam agrees to help him. The two track down Metatron, but Dean proves no match for him and is fatally wounded. In Heaven, Gadreel and Castiel are found out and locked in Heaven's dungeon. Gadreel sacrifices himself to free Castiel and convince the angel Hannah to help him. Castiel finds and shatters the angel tablet, reverting Metatron to a regular angel and forcing him to flee before Sam can kill him. Metatron confronts Castiel, arrogantly announcing that he will rule both humanity and the angels who he sees as beneath him, not knowing that Castiel is broadcasting his words to every angel in existence. The angels turn on Metatron, overpowering him. Castiel locks Metatron in Heaven's dungeon instead of killing him. The other angels look to Castiel as their leader once more, however he would rather be a regular angel. He is faced with the fact that he will die soon unless he replenishes his grace. Dean succumbs to his injuries and dies; while Sam tries to summon Crowley to make a deal to resurrect him, Crowley visits Dean, revealing that the Mark of Cain won't let go of him. Crowley tells him about how the human Cain had been transformed into a demon by the Mark upon his death. He then places the First Blade in Dean's hand, and Dean opens his eyes, now a demon himself.

== Production ==
On February 11, 2013, CW president Mark Pedowitz confirmed an early renewal of Supernatural for its ninth season, with the season premiere debuting on Tuesday, October 8, 2013. It was later confirmed, on February 25, 2013, that Misha Collins would return as a regular cast member, after being a special guest member for the previous two seasons. It was also announced that he would direct an episode in season 9.

A new character named Ennis was introduced in episode twenty of this season, which would serve as a backdoor pilot for Supernatural: Bloodlines. On May 8, 2014 it was announced that the spin-off had not been picked up by the CW Network.

== Reception ==
The review aggregator website Rotten Tomatoes gives the 9th season a 100% approval rating based on 12 reviews, with an average score of 8.3/10. The critics consensus reads, "Even in its ninth season, Supernatural continues to thrill and fright as it moves the Winchester brothers in surprising new directions."
