= No Man's Land: The Rise of Reeker =

- Film poster
- Directed by: Dave Payne
- Written by: Dave Payne
- Produced by: Dave Payne; Don Dunn; Tina Illman
- Starring: Stephen Martines; Valerie Cruz; Mircea Monroe; Desmond Askew
- Cinematography: Mike Mickens
- Edited by: Daniel Barone
- Music by: Dave Payne
- Distributed by: Lionsgate; Cinema Management Group (USA); Ghost House Underground (USA)
- Release date: October 14, 2008
- Running time: 88 minutes
- Country: United States
- Language: English
- Budget: US$2 million

No Man's Land: The Rise of Reeker (Reeker 2 in the UK) is a 2008 American supernatural slasher film about a sheriff and his son who are tracking down a group of bank robbers on their way to Mexico, only to discover that they are being stalked by a far more deadly enemy — The Reeker. It is a prequel to Reeker (2005).

The film released to DVD on October 14, 2008.

== Cast ==
- Michael Muhney as Harris
- Desmond Askew as Binky
- Mircea Monroe as Maya
- Robert Pine as Sheriff Reed
- Christopher Boyer as Officer Mansfield
- Michael Robert Brandon as The Drifter
- Wilmer Calderon as Carlos
- Valerie Cruz as Allison
- Shelly Desai as Ravi
- David Goldman as Father
- Ben Gunther as The Reeker
- Katie Lowes as Hospital Intern
- Stephen Martines as Alex
- Lyne Odums (or Baadja-Lyne Odums) as Psychiatrist
- Alejandro Patiño as Medic
- Ron Rogge as Nick
- David Stanbra as Young Sheriff Reed
- Lew Temple as Hitchhiker

== Production ==
The film's exteriors were filmed in Lancaster, California and the interiors were filmed in Los Angeles, California. The whole movie was set in Death Valley, a desert in California located southeast of the Sierra Nevada range in the Great Basin and the Mojave Desert.

== Reception ==
David Nusair from Reel Film.com gave the film one out of four stars, criticizing the film's lack of compelling characters which he called "one dimensional", and lack of suspense.
