= Supernatural: Bloodlines =

- Genre: Drama; Horror; Fantasy; Adventure
- Created by: Andrew Dabb
- Starring: Lucien Laviscount; Nathaniel Buzolic; Danielle Savre; Melissa Roxburgh; Sean Faris; Stephen Martines
- Country of origin: United States
- Original language: English
- No. of episodes: 1

Production
- Executive producers: Andrew Dabb; Eric Kripke; Robert Singer; Jeremy Carver
- Production locations: Vancouver, British Columbia; Chicago, Illinois
- Camera setup: Single-camera
- Production companies: Kripke Enterprises; Warner Bros. Television

Original release
- Network: The CW
- Release: April 29, 2014

Related
- Supernatural; The Winchesters

Supernatural: Bloodlines was a proposed American television series, before being decided against by The CW for the 2014–15 season. It was set to be a spin-off of Supernatural, with the twentieth episode of the show's ninth season serving as the backdoor pilot. The backdoor pilot was written by Andrew Dabb and directed by Robert Singer. The series was set to explore the "clashing hunter and monster cultures in Chicago".

== Production ==
The existence of a Supernatural spin-off being developed was first made known in an interview with Robert Singer at SDCC 2013. It was later revealed that the spin-off would be centered in Chicago, and focus on clashes between hunters and monsters factions and introduce new characters. The title of the spin-off was officially confirmed by The CW as Supernatural: Tribes on January 29, 2014, the same day the network announced their new pilot slate. Later, descriptions for the characters to be featured in the spin-off were released. On March 8, 2014, it was reported that the project had been renamed Supernatural: Bloodlines. Andrew Dabb looked at several spin-off television series when developing Supernatural: Bloodlines, including The Originals, Angel, Star Trek: Deep Space Nine, and the NCIS spin-offs.

An episode simply titled "Bloodlines" aired as the twentieth episode of Supernatural's ninth season. Ultimately, the show was not picked up for the 2014–2015 season. While the tenth season was later confirmed to be the main priority of the CW, Jeremy Carver and Eric Kripke later revealed the ongoing development of another spin-off, with a concept dissimilar to that of Bloodlines. Carver later clarified that another potential spin-off's backdoor pilot would air in Supernaturals eleventh season as opposed to the tenth season. Mark Pedowitz eventually clarified Carver's comments by revealing that a spin-off would be discussed in June 2015. As of August 2015, Pedowitz stated there are no current plans for another spin-off attempt but he is still very open to the idea in the future.

== Cast ==
- Lucien Laviscount as Ennis Ross, a police academy trainee who becomes a hunter after his fiancée is killed
- Stephen Martines as Freddie Costa, a Chicago cop and Ennis' mentor who secretly works for one of the monster families
- Erinn Westbrook as Tamara, Ennis's dead fiancée
- Sean Faris as Julian Duval, the head of the werewolf family
- Melissa Roxburgh as Violet Duval, a werewolf and Julian's marginalized sister who is romantically involved with David
- Danielle Savre as Margo Lassiter, the acting head of the shapeshifter family
- Nathaniel Buzolic as David Lassiter, a shapeshifter and Margo's brother who is romantically involved with Violet
- Bryce Johnson as Sal Lassiter, a dead shapeshifter who had formerly discouraged Violet from running off with David
