= Andrew Dabb =

American writer

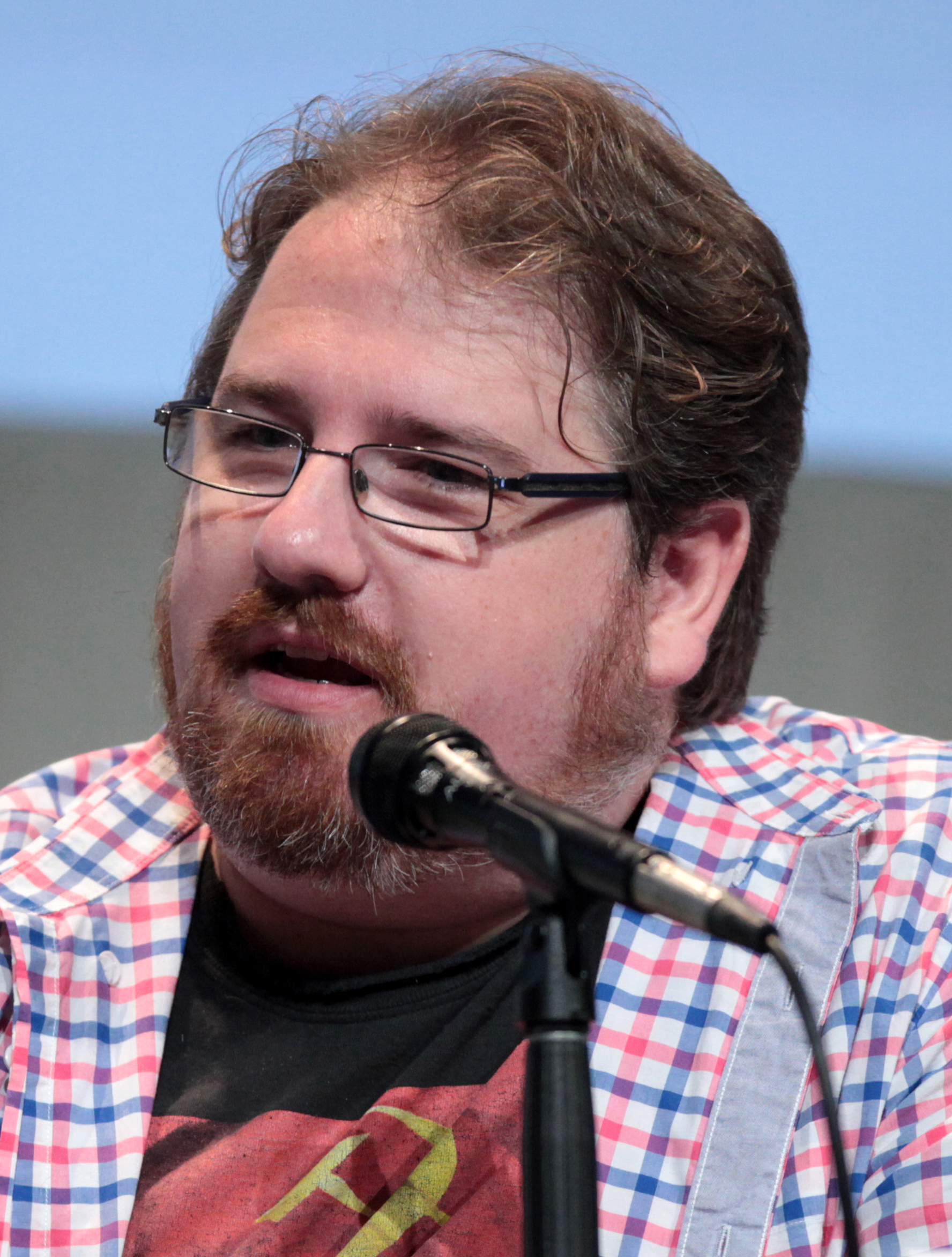
Dabb at the 2015 San Diego Comic-Con

Andrew Dabb is an American writer in the field of television, movies, and graphic novels.

== Career ==
Andrew Dabb's works include Ghostbusters: Legion, Happydale: Devils in the Desert, and Atomika; as well as the G.I. Joe and Dungeons & Dragons series. Dabb wrote the webcomic series Slices for opi8.com.

Dabb formally wrote for the television show Supernatural on The CW, including the episode "I Believe the Children Are Our Future" and a proposed spin-off, titled Supernatural: Bloodlines. He also penned the series' season 11 finale and took over as co-showrunner for series' final four seasons.

He was the showrunner for Resident Evil series on Netflix.

== Personal life ==
Dabb was born in Ogden, Utah and currently resides in Los Angeles.

== Filmography ==
=== Film ===
Title	Year	Credited as	Notes
Title	Year	Writer	Notes
Do or Die	2004	Yes	Short film
Therefore IM	2005	Yes	Short film

=== Television ===
Key
†	Denotes television series that have not yet been aired

Title	Year	Credited as			Network	Notes
Title	Year	Creator	Writer	Executive Producer	Network	Notes
Supernatural	2008–2020	No	Yes (45)	Yes	The CW	Story editor (season 5); Executive story editor (season 6); Producer (season 7); Supervising producer (season 8); Co-executive producer (seasons 9–11); Executive producer (seasons 12–15)
Supernatural: The Long Road Home	2020	No	Yes	Yes	The CW	Television special
Resident Evil	2022	Developed	Yes (2)	Yes	Netflix	
Grendel	2022†	No	Yes	Yes	Netflix	Post-production
