= Supernatural (American TV series) =

Dark fantasy television series (2005–2020)

- Genre: Dark fantasy; Action-adventure; Melodrama
- Created by: Eric Kripke
- Showrunners: Eric Kripke; Sera Gamble; Jeremy Carver; Andrew Dabb; Robert Singer
- Starring: Jared Padalecki; Jensen Ackles; Katie Cassidy; Lauren Cohan; Misha Collins; Mark A. Sheppard; Mark Pellegrino; Alexander Calvert
- Composers: Jay Gruska; Christopher Lennertz
- Country of origin: United States
- Original language: English
- No. of seasons: 15
- No. of episodes: 327 (list of episodes)

Production
- Executive producers: Eric Kripke; Robert Singer; McG; David Nutter; Kim Manners; Phil Sgriccia; Sera Gamble; Jeremy Carver; Adam Glass; Brad Buckner; Eugenie Ross-Leming
- Production locations: British Columbia, Canada
- Cinematography: Serge Ladouceur; Bradley S. Creasser
- Camera setup: Single-camera setup
- Running time: 38–45 minutes
- Production companies: Kripke Enterprises; Wonderland Sound and Vision; Warner Bros. Television

Original release
- Network: The WB
- Release: September 13, 2005 – May 4, 2006
- Network: The CW
- Release: September 28, 2006 – November 19, 2020

Related
- Supernatural: Bloodlines; The Winchesters

Supernatural is an American dark fantasy television series created by Eric Kripke that ran for 15 seasons. It premiered on The WB on September 13, 2005, moved to The CW in 2006, and ended on November 19, 2020. Starring Jared Padalecki and Jensen Ackles, the show follows brothers Sam and Dean Winchester, who hunt ghosts, monsters, and other supernatural beings. Throughout the series, they battle angels and demons while trying to save the world and prevent the Apocalypse. Guest actors Misha Collins, Mark A. Sheppard, and Mark Pellegrino were promoted to series regulars.

The project originated from Kripke's idea of a cross-country road trip and was approved by Warner Bros. It ran for four showrunner periods: Kripke (seasons 1–5), Sera Gamble (seasons 6–7), Jeremy Carver (seasons 8–11), and the duo of Andrew Dabb and Robert Singer (seasons 12–15). The writing is based on a monster-of-the-week concept and incorporates brotherly codependency, Americana, family psychology, Judeo-Christian mythology, and self-referential humor. Production was based in Vancouver, British Columbia, with chiaroscuro cinematography by Serge Ladouceur and an in-house visual effects department to save on costs. The soundtrack combines original music by Jay Gruska and Christopher Lennertz with classic rock songs, including "Carry On Wayward Son" by Kansas.

Most episodes had an audience of over a million viewers in the United States, peaking at 5.82 million. It was the longest-running series on The CW and the longest-running fantasy series in American television history. The complete 15-season series was released on DVD and Blu-ray on May 25, 2021. Critical reception of the show was mixed to positive; critics praised the on-screen chemistry of Padalecki and Ackles and called the first five seasons its peak. Other reviewers criticized the repetitive storylines and confusing plots of later seasons. Supernatural was nominated for three Primetime Emmy Awards and won nine People's Choice Awards. The series developed a large fan base that regularly attends conventions. Other media include novel and comic adaptations as well as spin-offs such as The Winchesters (2022–2023).

== Premise ==
=== Plot ===
In their childhood, Sam and Dean Winchester lose their mother Mary to a mysterious supernatural creature, prompting their father John to raise them as hunters to track it. The first three seasons focus on the brothers' lives as hunters on the road, beginning with their search for their missing father. Sam is studying at Stanford University with his girlfriend Jessica until she is killed in the same way as his mother. He then leaves school and joins Dean; they travel around the United States hunting monsters, ghosts, demons, and other supernatural beings which are often drawn from folklore and urban legends.

John trades his life to keep Dean alive at the beginning of the second season. The brothers find that the yellow-eyed demon Azazel was responsible for killing Mary and Jessica and forcing Sam to consume demon blood as a baby. After Sam is killed, Dean makes a deal with a crossroads demon to bring Sam back, trading his soul for Sam's resurrection and leaving himself with only one year to live. The brothers then destroy Azazel. Dean's deal expires at the end of the third season and he is dragged to Hell by hellhounds, but the angel Castiel resurrects him at the beginning of the fourth season. Developing empathy for humanity, Castiel turns against Heaven and joins the Winchesters to prevent the coming Apocalypse. Manipulated by the demon Ruby and the demon blood, Sam kills Lilith, inadvertently releasing the fallen archangel Lucifer from his imprisonment in Hell.

By the fifth season, Sam and Dean are destined to be the "vessels" for Lucifer and the archangel Michael, respectively, in a final world-ending battle. Sam breaks free of the possession and imprisons Michael and Lucifer by throwing himself into Lucifer's Cage and is later resurrected by Castiel. In the sixth season, Castiel and the demon Crowley find a way to reach Purgatory to keep the archangel Raphael from restarting the Apocalypse, which unleashes monsters called Leviathans. During the seventh season, the brothers battle the Leviathans and their leader Dick Roman to destroy them and prevent the use of human beings as a food source. Following Roman's demise, Dean is trapped in Purgatory for a year before returning to assist Sam in closing the Gates of Hell through a series of trials in the eighth season.

The angel Metatron creates a spell that expels all angels from Heaven to Earth. Tricked out of his grace and betrayed, Castiel becomes a regular human and struggles to survive during the ninth season. Dean tricks Sam, who is dying, into allowing an angel to possess his body to save him, which causes conflict between the brothers and leads Dean to accept the Mark of Cain to gain enough power to kill the demon Abaddon. This Mark also causes violence in Dean, making him be reborn as a demon after his death. When Sam and Rowena MacLeod try to cast a spell from the Book of the Damned to remove the Mark, they release Amara, God's sister and the entity known as the Darkness.

God is revealed to be the prophet and novelist Chuck Shurley. In the eleventh season, Chuck teams up with others to try to conquer Amara, but they ultimately resolve their sibling conflict. Amara resurrects Mary Winchester to thank the brothers. In the twelfth season, Lucifer impregnates a human woman and fathers a Nephilim named Jack Kline. Despite fearing Jack is dangerous, the brothers adopt him along with Castiel; however, Jack opens a dimensional portal to an apocalyptic alternate universe and releases an evil alternate Michael. Dean offers to be Michael's vessel to destroy Lucifer and rescue Jack and Sam. Jack expends his remaining power to eliminate Michael, but loses his soul and accidentally kills Mary.

Chuck resurfaces and demands the brothers kill Jack. Once aware that Chuck has been controlling their lives for his own entertainment, Sam and Dean defy him, angering Chuck. The fifteenth and final season chronicles the Winchesters' climactic rebellion against God, in which Castiel gives his life to save Dean from Death and is thrown into the Empty, where angels and demons reside after death. Jack absorbs Chuck's power, which lets the brothers reclaim their free will. Dean dies on a routine hunting trip; Sam lives to old age, and the brothers are finally reunited in Heaven.

=== Characters ===
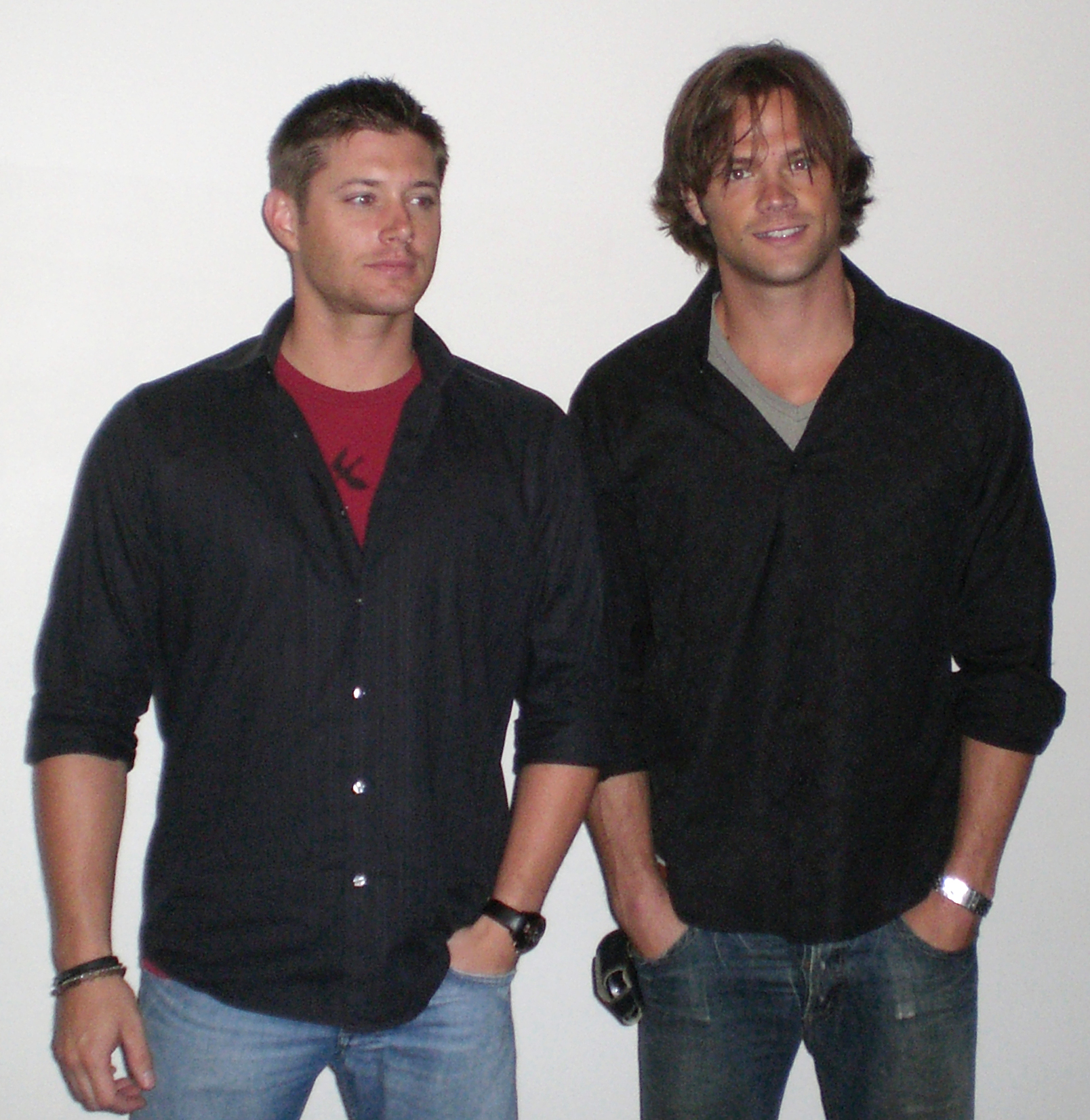
Jensen Ackles (left) and Jared Padalecki (right) portray Dean and Sam Winchester.

The premise of Supernatural is the quest of two brothers, Sam (Jared Padalecki) and Dean Winchester (Jensen Ackles), to hunt supernatural creatures. Sam is portrayed as rebellious and intelligent, wishing for a normal life; Dean is more of an action man, exhibiting a protective nature, loyalty, and dedication to the family business. Their motto is "saving people, hunting things, the family business".

The series has many recurring characters. John Winchester (Jeffrey Dean Morgan) is the father who trains the brothers to hunt demons. After his death, veteran hunter Bobby Singer (Jim Beaver) becomes a surrogate father for the brothers and mentors them. The third season is the only one with Katie Cassidy (as Ruby) and Lauren Cohan (as the thief Bela Talbot) in the main cast. After Cassidy's departure, Ruby was played by Genevieve Cortese in the fourth season.

In the fourth season, Misha Collins joined the cast as Castiel; scholar Louisa Ellen Stein wrote that his introduction marked a conceptual transition for the series. Despite the former angel Anna Milton's description of angels as emotionless, many of them can be influenced, including Castiel, who develops empathy for humans, rebels against Heaven to side with Sam and Dean, and becomes part of Team Free Will. Castiel's popularity resulted in Collins's promotion to series regular, and he was part of the main cast for seasons 5–6 and 9–15. During the brothers' quest, they are assisted by Ellen (Samantha Ferris) and her daughter Jo Harvelle (Alona Tal), hacker Charlie Bradbury (Felicia Day), prophet Kevin Tran (Osric Chau), and Rowena MacLeod (Ruth Connell). In seasons 13–15, Alexander Calvert joined the main cast as Jack Kline, a powerful young Nephilim who is adopted and protected by the Winchesters and Castiel.

Mark A. Sheppard portrayed Crowley as a series regular in seasons 10–12. Introduced in the fifth season, Crowley is a clever crossroads demon who maneuvers into the position of King of Hell and plays both sides against the middle to serve his own interests. After joining the series in the fifth season, Mark Pellegrino played Lucifer's primary vessel across multiple seasons and eventually was promoted to the main cast for seasons 12–14. Antagonists who turn into allies include the demon Meg Masters (Nicki Aycox and Rachel Miner) and the archangel Gabriel, also known as the Trickster (Richard Speight Jr.). Other notable villains include Azazel (Fredric Lehne), Lilith (Katherine Boecher), Dick Roman (James Patrick Stuart), Metatron (Curtis Armstrong), Abaddon (Alaina Huffman), Amara the Darkness (Emily Swallow), and Chuck Shurley (Rob Benedict), who turns out to be God.

=== Themes ===
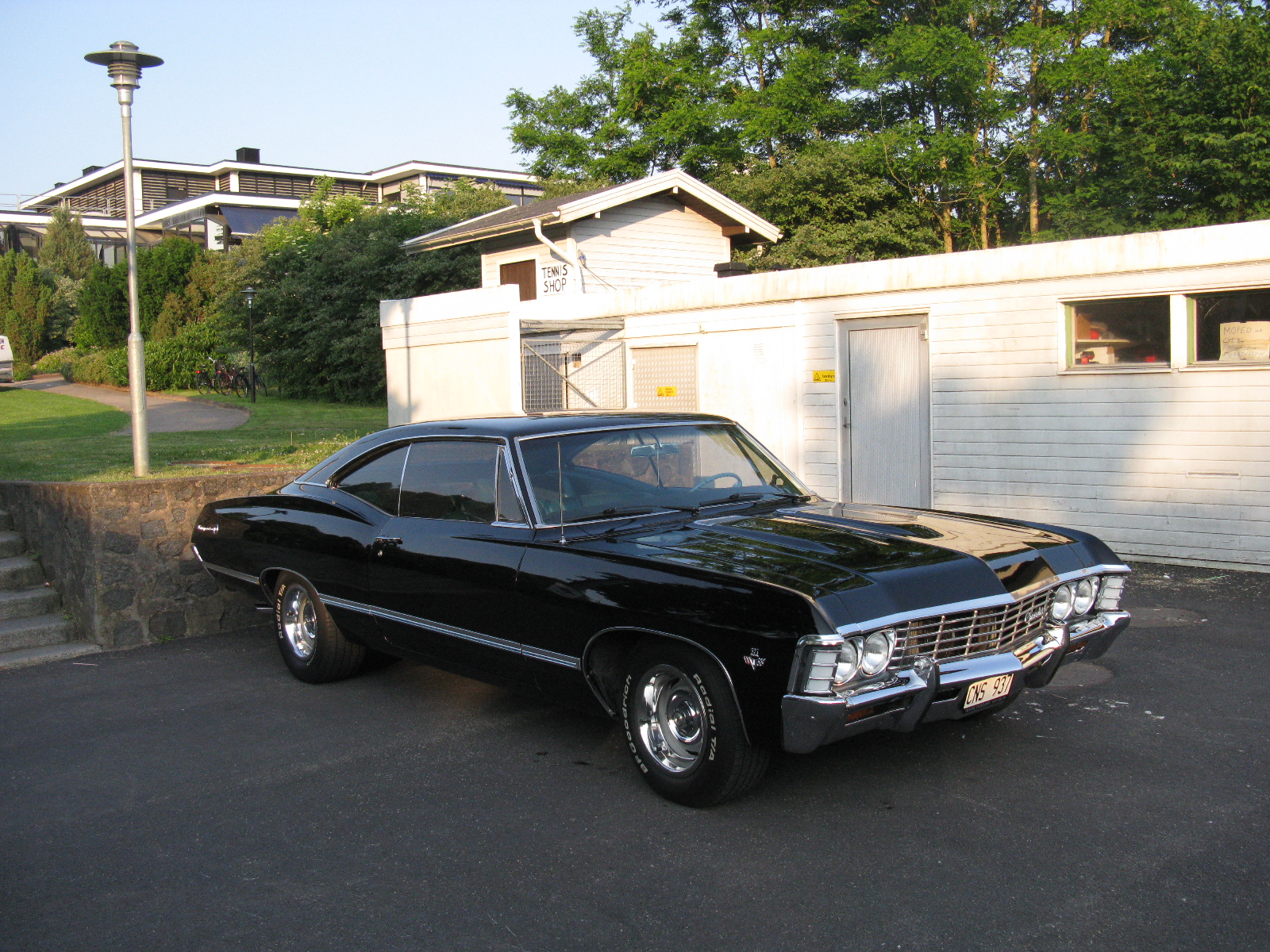
A 1967 Chevrolet Impala similar to the one used in the series.

Supernatural blends the genres of dark fantasy, action-adventure, and melodrama, with elements of soap opera, Western, road movie, slapstick comedy, Gothic horror, splatter, and slasher. Most episodes begin with a weekly mystery case in which a creature stalks and kills a random minor character. Sam and Dean travel around the US in a 1967 Chevrolet Impala, which they consider their "real home", where they share personal struggles, bicker, and exchange banter such as "bitch" and "jerk". The brothers find supernatural events by searching newspapers and websites. To conduct interrogations and bypass local police, they use fake IDs and impersonate officers from the Federal Bureau of Investigation (FBI) or other law enforcement agencies. Sam usually handles the research using libraries and the internet.

On a typical hunt, the brothers investigate an unexplained death or supernatural threat. They determine who or what the culprit is, track it down, and kill it. Their father's journal, a reference book, helps them through danger; scholar Rebecca Stone Gordon characterized it as a deus ex machina. They are often assisted by Bobby, Castiel, Crowley, and other allies. The tools they commonly use to combat supernatural entities include salting (to ward off ghosts or demons) and burning (to wipe out a spirit's corpse); specific objects, folk remedies, or incantations; and special weapons such as the Word of God tablets, the Colt revolver, flasks of holy water, wooden stakes, Ruby's knife, silver blades, and silver bullets. Once a case is closed, the brothers move on until they stumble upon another.

The brotherly love between Sam and Dean is central to the series; the angel Zachariah refers to their relationship as "psychotically, irrationally, and erotically" codependent. The brothers have a propensity for engaging in immoral and unethical activities to keep each other safe, and suffer psychological distress if they fail to do so. Their willingness to give up their lives to save each other results in a cycle of sacrifice, death, resurrection, and torture. The show deals with the idea of found family, embodied by Bobby's quote "Family don't end with blood", and suggests that family has more to do with personal choice and mutual acceptance than with biology. The Winchester brothers introduce non-humans such as the angel Castiel and the Nephilim Jack into their family. The concept of family extends to a cosmic level: Lucifer's war with the other angels is one between brothers; God's conflict with his sister, the Darkness, is a family dispute.

The series is a reflection of Americana and the life of the working poor. Not being typical superheroes with superpowers, the Winchester brothers are marginalized: they live off stolen credit cards, drive an old fuel-inefficient car while listening to 1970s classic rock, travel nomadically between small towns, and stay in run-down motels. The 1967 Impala, which is more than just their vehicle or home, represents the brothers' masculinity, freedom, and independence. The series depicts their complex trauma originating from their father, John, who raised them as soldiers following their mother's death. In Supernatural Psychology: Roads Less Traveled, Leandra Parris attributed their tendency to sacrifice their lives to this lack of paternal affection; Denisse Morales traced Dean's guilt complex and exaggerated sense of responsibility to his childhood role as Sam's caretaker. Stephan Schaffrath and Colt J. Blunt observed that the violence and death of the hunts psychologically torment the brothers and cause them to exhibit symptoms of post-traumatic stress disorder (PTSD).

Supernatural plays with Judeo-Christian ideas of Heaven, Hell, and Purgatory, but none of them offers everlasting comfort, according to Sarah Elaine Neill. Heaven is depicted as a place where humans relive their happiest memories, but it is a bureaucratic and dogmatic system overseen by angels. Under Crowley's rule, Hell is redesigned to operate like an endless, bureaucratic waiting line. A central theme of the series is the conflict between human free will and divine predetermination. When angels try to make Sam and Dean obey the apocalyptic script in the Bible, they rebel and protect their right to choose. The show blurs the ethical binary with cruel angels and kindly demons, a reversal of traditional theology.

The show frequently breaks the fourth wall via metafictional episodes that provide self-referential humor and commentary on the show's creation process. Such episodes include those featuring Chuck, a writer who creates a book series about Supernatural centered on Sam and Dean; the satirical "Changing Channels", in which the brothers are trapped in a series of television show parodies; "The French Mistake", in which Sam and Dean are sent to the real world as actors Padalecki and Ackles; and the musical episode "Fan Fiction", which pays homage to fandom and fan fiction.

== Episodes ==
Season	Episodes		Originally released			Rank	Average viewership (in millions)
Season	Episodes		First released	Last released	Network	Rank	Average viewership (in millions)
1	22		September 13, 2005	May 4, 2006	The WB	165	3.81
2	22		September 28, 2006	May 17, 2007	The CW	216	3.14
3	16		October 4, 2007	May 15, 2008	The CW	187	2.74
4	22		September 18, 2008	May 14, 2009	The CW	161	3.14
5	22		September 10, 2009	May 13, 2010	The CW	125	2.64
6	22		September 24, 2010	May 20, 2011	The CW	209	2.42
7	23		September 23, 2011	May 18, 2012	The CW	176	2.03
8	23		October 3, 2012	May 15, 2013	The CW	152	2.52
9	23		October 8, 2013	May 20, 2014	The CW	141	2.81
10	23		October 7, 2014	May 20, 2015	The CW	156	2.02
11	23		October 7, 2015	May 25, 2016	The CW	131	2.81
12	23		October 13, 2016	May 18, 2017	The CW	132	2.62
13	23		October 12, 2017	May 17, 2018	The CW	166	2.32
14	20		October 11, 2018	April 25, 2019	The CW	159	2.07
15	20	13	October 10, 2019	March 23, 2020	The CW	116	1.86
15	20	7	October 8, 2020	November 19, 2020	The CW	131	1.63

== Production ==
=== Development ===
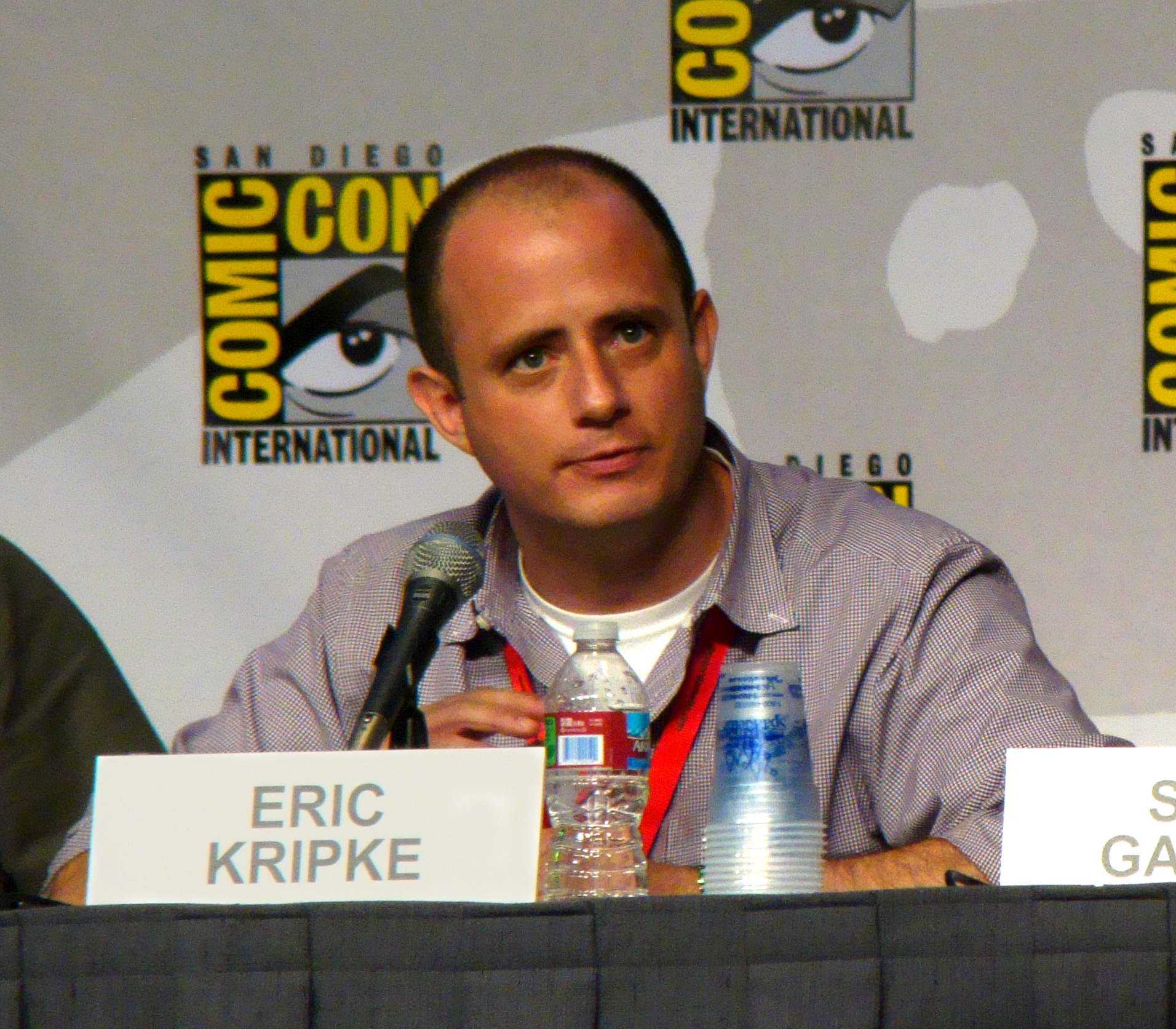
Eric Kripke is the creator of Supernatural.

Creator Eric Kripke developed the concept of Supernatural more than ten years before it was picked up by Warner Bros. Kripke was inspired by a family road trip when he was nine, an experience that gave him a passion for road-trip stories. He was also influenced by John Bellairs's Gothic novel The House with a Clock in Its Walls (1973), particularly the way it combined elements of mystery, family dynamics, and folklore. Jack Kerouac's 1957 novel On the Road was another inspiration for him.

Initially, Kripke pitched an anthology show resembling Kolchak: The Night Stalker (1974–1975), about a tabloid reporter investigating supernatural phenomena. It was rejected because such shows were rarely successful on primetime television. He then changed his concept to a cross-country American travelogue along the lines of Route 66 (1960–1964), which The WB approved. Kripke stated the show resembled "Star Wars in truck-stop America", and he described it as "pure, stripped down and uniquely American". UPN president Dawn Ostroff believed in Supernatural and rolled out a heavy marketing campaign before its debut; The WB commissioned David Nutter to direct the pilot.

The project was greenlit in January 2005. The pilot episode was produced by Wonderland Sound and Vision; Joseph McGinty "McG" Nichol was an executive producer and Peter Johnson was a co-executive producer. Before the episode's production, major changes were made to the characters' backgrounds: the brothers were initially raised by their aunt and uncle, and Sam was unaware of supernatural creatures. Kripke and Johnson decided to simplify the plot by having the brothers' father raise them as hunters. Robert Singer was added as an executive producer to provide production experience for Kripke. To help build the mythology, the production team hired John Shiban, who had previously worked on The X-Files (1993–2018), as a co-executive producer. Although original plans called for the show to run for three seasons, Kripke extended it to five seasons and hoped it would end on a high note.

Supernatural went through four showrunner eras: Kripke (seasons 1–5), Sera Gamble (seasons 6–7), Jeremy Carver (seasons 8–11), and the duo of Andrew Dabb and Singer (seasons 12–15). Kripke stepped down as showrunner in favor of Gamble, but remained as a consulting producer for the sixth season before leaving the series to work on Revolution (2012–2014). Following Kripke's departure, succeeding showrunners were drawn from the writing staff to preserve the framework he established. Cast members also directed episodes, including Ackles, who directed the sixth-season episode "Weekend at Bobby's", and Collins, who directed the ninth-season episode "Mother's Little Helper". Executive producers included Phil Sgriccia, Singer, Kripke, McG, Carver, Eugenie Ross-Leming, Brad Buckner, Adam Glass, Gamble, Kim Manners, and Nutter. Kripke Enterprises and Warner Bros. Television co-produced the series with Wonderland Sound and Vision.

With a dedicated global fanbase, the series survived many changes, including shifts in network executives, six time-slot changes, and the 2007–2008 Writers Guild of America (WGA) strike. The storylines were set to end with the fifth season, but a spike in ratings led to the show's renewal in February 2010. Although its viewership was lower than that of the Big Four television networks, the series was renewed 14 times. The CW president Mark Pedowitz once stated it would continue as long as it maintained stable viewership; the decision to end the series came from the lead actors rather than the network. On March 22, 2019, Padalecki, Ackles, and Collins revealed that the show's fifteenth season would be its last. Production was paused from March 13 to August 18, 2020, because of the COVID-19 pandemic.

=== Casting ===
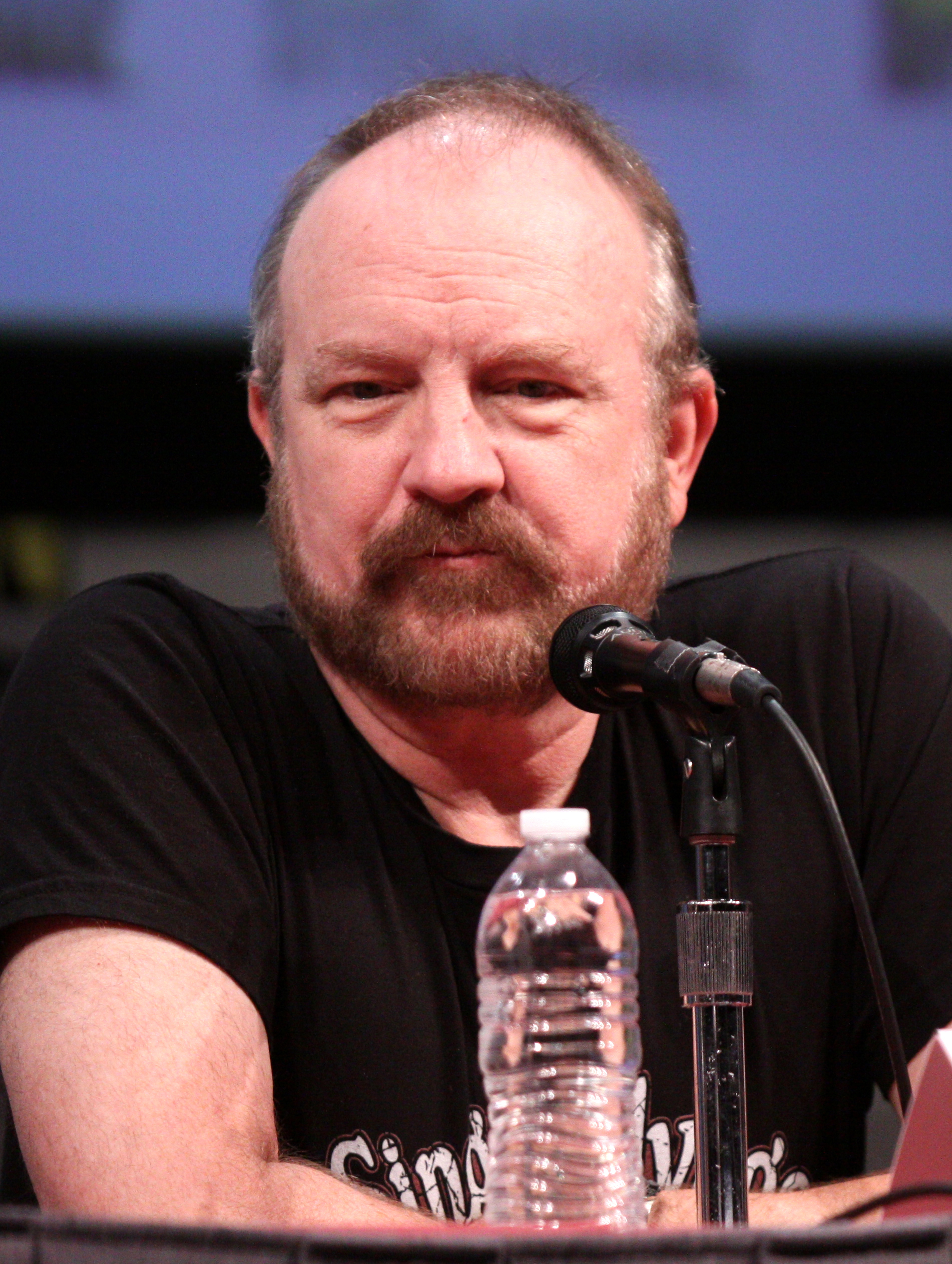
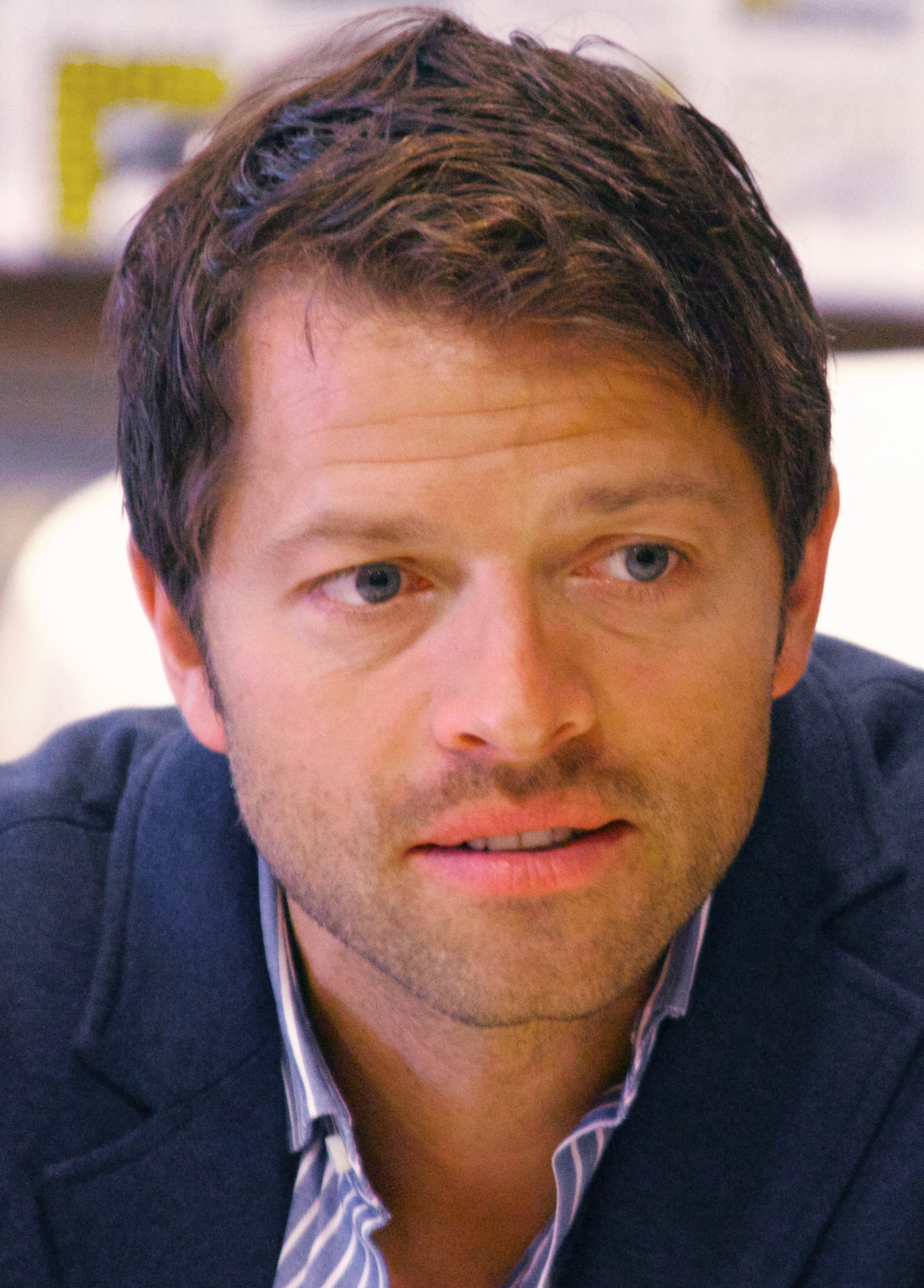
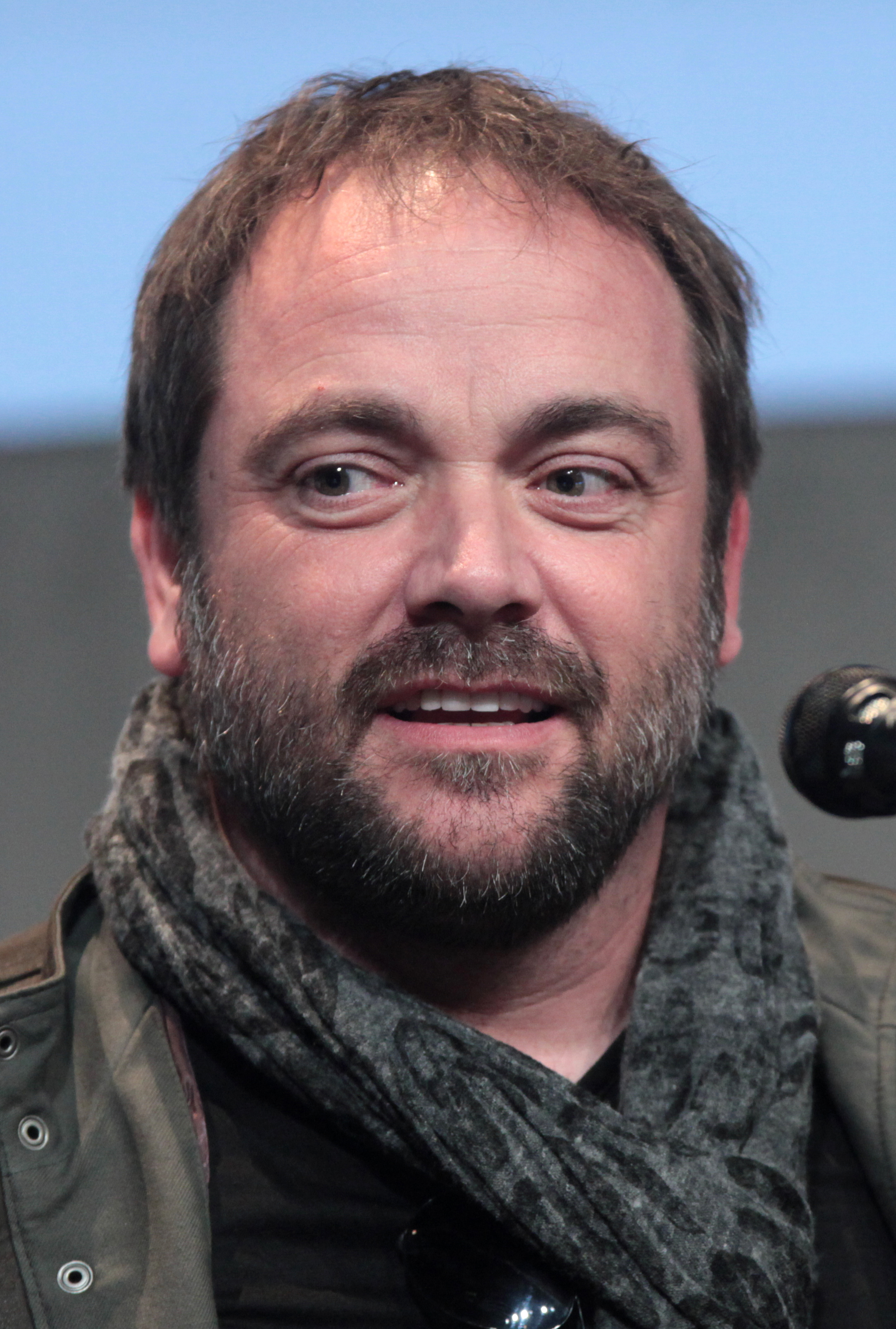
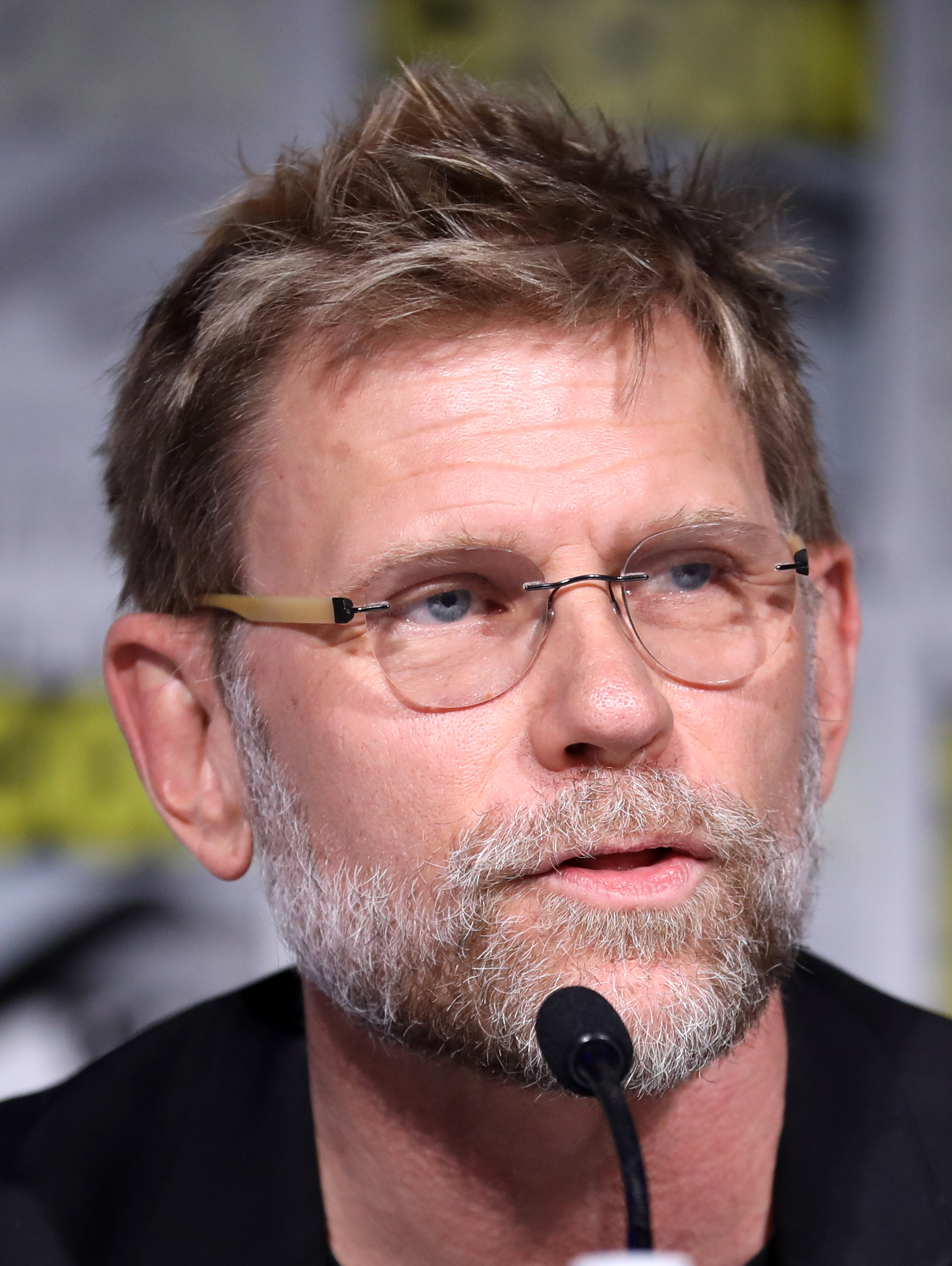
Jim Beaver (top left), Misha Collins (top right), Mark A. Sheppard (bottom left), and Mark Pellegrino (bottom right) had their roles expanded to recurring status.

In February 2005, Padalecki and Ackles joined Supernatural. They were known to The WB audience, as Ackles had recurring roles on Dawson's Creek (1998–2003) and Smallville (2001–2011), while Padalecki had appeared on Gilmore Girls (2000–2007). The decision to cast them represented The WB's practice of creating new programs based on supporting actors from its past series. Casting the lead characters resulted in a stalemate for Kripke and the network over whether Padalecki or Ackles should play Sam. Ackles chose to play Dean partly because the character was comedic and reckless. He attributed their casting to the immediate chemistry they shared during their audition.

Some guest stars were promoted to the main cast or recurring roles. (Note: Guest stars who were promoted to the main cast or became recurring cast members included Jim Beaver, Misha Collins, Mark A. Sheppard, and Mark Pellegrino.) Beaver believed his role as Bobby would be only for the first-season finale, and he was delighted when it became recurring in later seasons. Despite support from the crew and audiences, he rejected opportunities to become a series regular. Collins said that his character Castiel was initially written for a few episodes of the fourth season, but positive fan response extended the role long-term. The angel later became a core character and was considered a third brother to Sam and Dean. Sheppard became a central part of the series after the crew was impressed by his portrayal of Crowley. Pellegrino was initially cast as Lucifer for only a few episodes of the fifth season, but he reprised the role across later seasons. He stated that his role received much love from viewers, noting that the appreciation "remained constant and even grew".

Shot in Vancouver, British Columbia, Supernatural cast several Canadian actors who were in other series filmed locally, including The X-Files and iZombie (2015–2019). The cast also included several actors from Joss Whedon's works, such as Buffy the Vampire Slayer (1997–2003) and Angel (1999–2004). Academic and writer Erin Giannini noted that this casting strategy was used to attract viewers.

=== Writing ===
Supernatural's writing team, under the direction of Kripke, worked closely together. Outlines were revised with Singer, while final revisions by Kripke preserved a consistent tone. The writing staff researched books, academic writings on folklore, urban legends, and websites such as Wikipedia. They searched for real references that viewers could look up to make the show "Google-worthy".

Kripke chose the brothers' first names Sal and Dean, taken from On the Road, before changing "Sal" to "Sam". The surname of the brothers was originally "Harrison", as a tribute to Harrison Ford. After discovering a real "Dean Harrison" lived in Kansas, Kripke changed it to "Winchester", after the Winchester Mystery House. Inspired by urban legends and the "hero's quest" trope, and set in everyday suburbia, the show combines genuine scares with dark humor. It was initially intended to follow a self-contained monster-of-the-week format, but this was dropped from the tenth episode of the first season onward as Kripke felt the early episodes were "hit and miss". The series shifted focus to the psychological development and relationship of the Winchester brothers after the writers recognized the on-screen chemistry between the two lead actors.

Kripke once claimed that he had a five-season plan, but he later stated that this was a way to deal with uncertainty about the show's future. To avoid diluting the show's plotlines, the writers decided to kill off the brothers' father, John Winchester, early on in the series. To maintain tension when viewers knew the two leads were unlikely to die permanently, the writers often placed guest characters in mortal danger. The producers expanded the universe by introducing new recurring characters: two female antagonists in the third season and angels in the fourth season, a direction Kripke initially opposed but later accepted to balance the forces of good and evil. "Swan Song", the final episode of the fifth season where Sam sacrifices himself to defeat Lucifer and Michael, was intended to be the series finale before the renewal in February 2010.

When Kripke departed at the end of the fifth season, the new showrunner, Gamble, decided not to introduce another major villain and believed it would be hard for a new character to match the scale of Lucifer. She restructured the series in the sixth season with multiple parallel story arcs instead of a single climactic story arc. Carver simplified the series after feeling that it had become "a little bit buried under its mythology", using a "reset" to extend storylines across seasons 8–10. Dabb used a cyclical structure: he reused old themes and expanded the series' mythological universe from the twelfth season to its end. Nearly every season includes an episode that breaks the fourth wall, in which the series explores alternate realities, behind-the-scenes production, or its generic forebears. The writing staff's homage to classic rock can be found throughout the series; episode titles are taken from 1960s or 1970s songs, and the Winchester brothers often use the names of rock musicians (e.g., members of Led Zeppelin) as aliases during investigations.

=== Production design ===
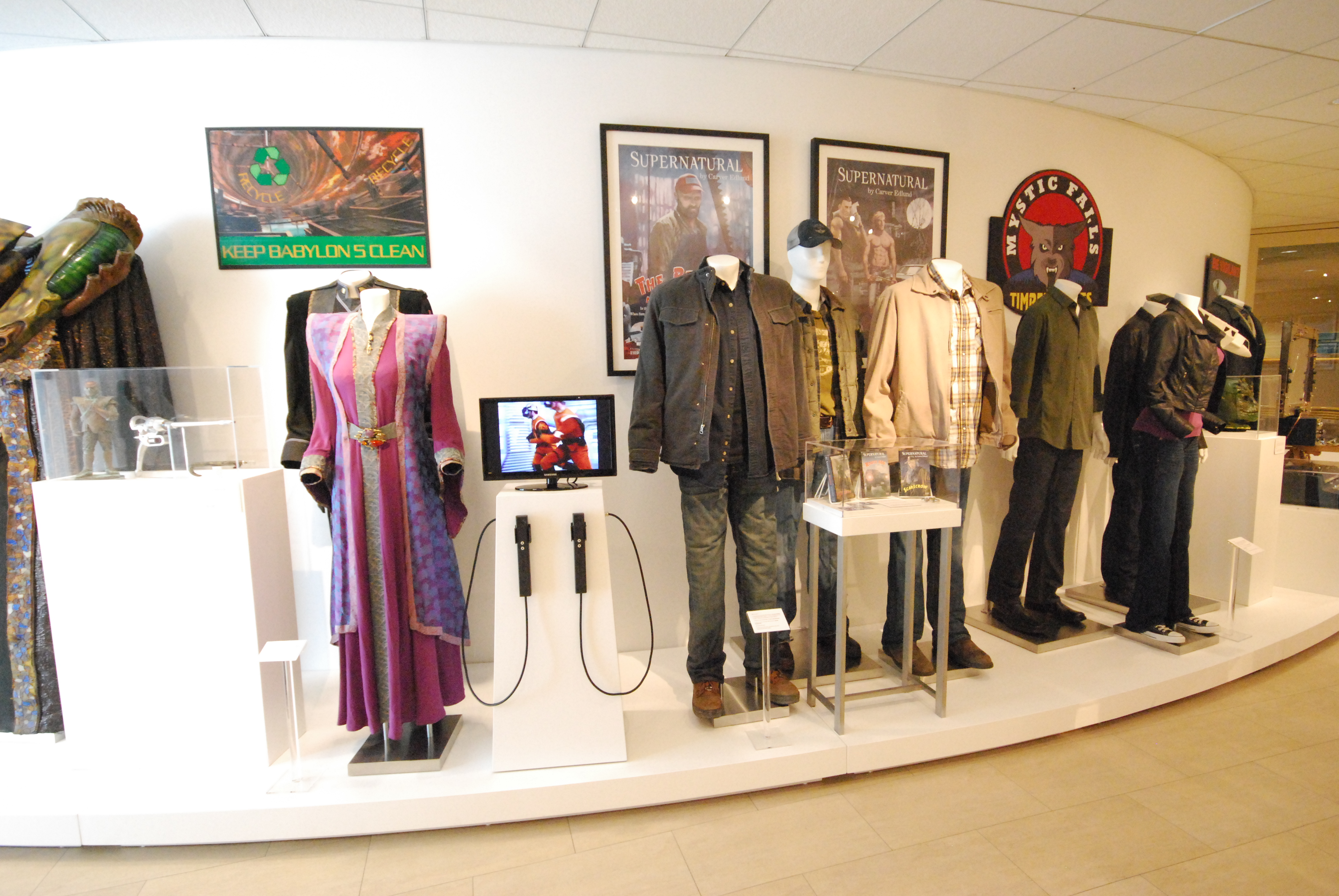
Costume designs for the Winchester brothers on display at the Paley Center for Media (2012).

Jerry Wanek was the production designer who helped define the primary color palette for the cinematographer. During the 15 years of production up to March 2020, he designed 176 American motel and hotel room sets, all constructed on soundstages. The rooms were all built with similar layouts, which were refreshed continuously through set dressing to portray a specific region for the series' setting. These sets were metaphorical transitional spaces; their Americana aesthetic added visual contrast to the dark settings.

In the early seasons, the crew constantly had to redress sets due to the frequent use of different hotel rooms. When the Men of Letters bunker, with a large library and strategy room, was introduced in the eighth season as a standing set, it saved the crew time on set building and became the brothers' first true home. The 1967 Impala was both a mode of transportation and a "third character". Its design was carefully detailed, and it had a cache in the trunk for hidden weapons.

The wardrobe of the Winchester brothers brought the Gothic horror genre into modern times by replacing Victorian clothing with flannel shirts and rugged jeans. The color palette for the costumes was inspired by 1970s horror films and consisted primarily of dark earth tones. Sam usually wears a brown jacket, while Dean wears a dark T-shirt and his style resembles Ford's look from Star Wars. Costuming became a plot device when the brothers disguised themselves as law enforcement to work on cases. To depict a supernatural entity in human guise, the angel Castiel took the form of an unshaven man, appearing like a "tax accountant" in a rumpled trench coat similar to the character John Constantine or the actor Humphrey Bogart.

=== Filming ===
Except for the pilot filmed in Los Angeles, Supernatural was filmed primarily at Canadian Motion Picture Park Studios (CMPP) in Vancouver. The show ran on a tight schedule, generally filming for eight days per episode, supplemented with preparation and post-production. Despite this, the producers agreed to cap workdays at 14 hours. The pilot and the first three seasons were shot on 35 mm film before the series moved to digital cameras for the fourth season.

The visual style was developed by cinematographer Serge Ladouceur, who shot 320 of the 327 episodes; the other seven were filmed by Ladouceur's longtime A-camera operator Bradley S. Creasser. The series adapted The X-Files' expressionist lighting style into a grungy chiaroscuro, dominated by a black, brown, and dark blue color scheme. Ladouceur prioritized a natural, source-justified lighting style. During the early first season, the gloomy visuals were created by a digital bleach bypass process in the timing suite to desaturate colors and increase contrast. The CW pushed the crew to increase the frame's brightness and saturation, but the series returned to its original dark and gritty look with Kripke's approval by the beginning of the fourth season. Kripke opposed excessive slow motion during action sequences to maintain realism and rawness.

The crew mechanized some filming processes by building specialized equipment, such as a rig named "Highways" used for side or profile driving shots of the Impala. The rig was made of two 20-foot-long (6.1 m) devices that used conveyor belts to carry battery-powered LED lights behind black cutouts to simulate the car moving. To add a realistic sense of distance, the wheels on the device were configured to rotate at different speeds. The series combined serialized content with special standalone episodes, such as "Scoobynatural" and "The French Mistake". "Ghostfacers" used handheld cameras and night-vision goggles to mimic a found-footage film, or a reality television show, while "Monster Movie" was shot in black and white as a nod to classic Universal Pictures films.

=== Visual effects ===
Ivan Hayden was the visual effects (VFX) supervisor for Supernatural. Because the show aired on The CW, a smaller television network, it had a tight budget; the expensive VFX and night shoots placed the series' long-term future in doubt. To cut costs, the production formed its own in-house VFX department starting in the second season. The team manipulated their environment directly, controlling artificial smoke and wetting down floors to make areas appear darker to portray loneliness and coldness. For Castiel's introduction in "Lazarus Rising", they switched the light bulbs off remotely and ignited hundreds of pre-set sparks so that they could do a faster reset between takes.

The visual style focused on authenticity. The depiction of the spiritual world in the early seasons drew heavily from Japanese horror films. The production showed higher powers as normal people wearing street clothes without any elaborate makeup. Angels only revealed their true nature through their wings' shadows or blinding white light, while demons took human form, recognizable by their black eyes and the dense black smoke they emitted when possessing a human. Armageddon was depicted as a confrontation between two ordinary men from rural America. This reflected the show's premise that Heaven and Hell exist in everyday life.

Despite broadcast restriction and the expense of night scenes, the series pushed the limits of television gore. Body horror was common in plotlines involving embodied monsters or hellish torture, while haunting episodes contrasted desiccated or skeletonized remains with the freshly torn, gory bodies of the vengeful ghost's victims, which were sometimes used to provide comic relief. After censorship restrictions were loosened, the show turned to more graphic violence such as decapitations and exploding bodies. In line with the mid-2000s surge in cinematic torture horror, the series added torture themes to its storylines.

=== Music ===
The series comprises three musical elements: classic rock for Dean's persona, emotional family themes, and horror scores. The latter two, composed by Jay Gruska and Christopher Lennertz, are original scores that reflect the characters' inner lives and the supernatural entities. Gruska's "Americana" is an instrumental piece that represents the themes of family and vulnerability. When the brothers are facing death or an existential issue, the music is non-melodic or silent to avoid heavy-handedness. The show uses contemporary music for the victims to contrast their lives with the brothers' demon-hunting world.

Unlike the original score, classic rock is usually diegetic, coming from within the show to convey normalcy and reality. Kripke insisted on using this genre, threatening to quit if forced to use contemporary bands, whose music he felt did not fit the Winchester brothers. The series uses music by classic rock artists such as Kansas, AC/DC, and Def Leppard. Kansas's "Carry On Wayward Son" (1976) became the unofficial theme song, playing during the recap at the beginning of every season finale from the second season onward.

== Broadcast ==
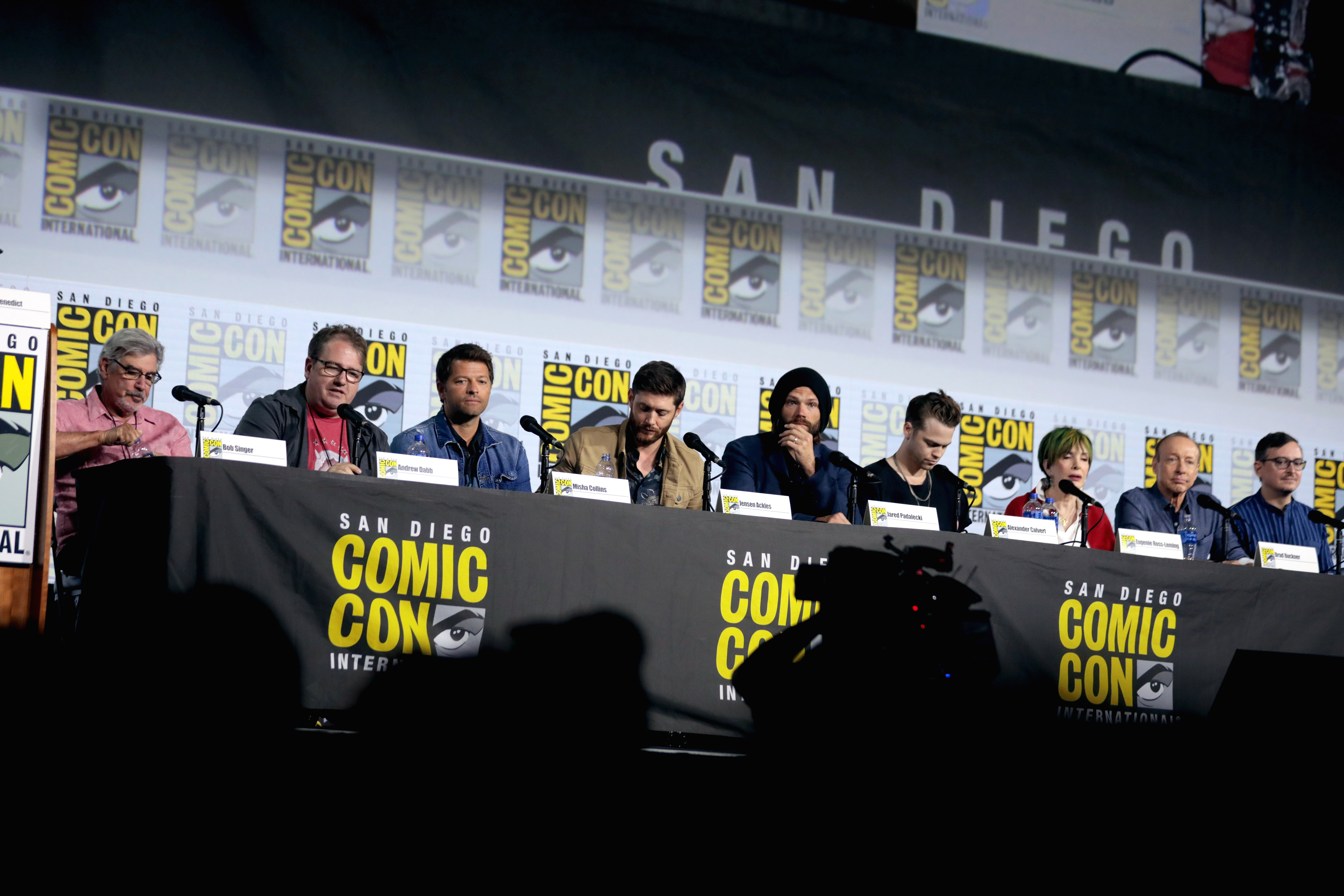
The crew of Supernatural participating in a panel at the 2019 San Diego Comic-Con.

WB president David Janollari wanted to target Supernatural at the 12-to-34-year-old demographic. Because The WB had weaker television coverage than other networks, the network launched a major guerrilla marketing campaign to promote the series. Promotional efforts targeting young people focused on cafes, bars, movie theaters, and gas stations. The network made the pilot episode of Supernatural available online on Yahoo for a week before its debut, a marketing move considered uncommon in 2005.

The series premiered on September 13, 2005. After four weeks of increasing viewership, The WB ordered a full first season. In 2006, The WB and UPN merged to form The CW, and Supernatural was the only new WB program retained. With a loyal and stable audience, the series became a strategic tentpole for The CW. Running for 15 seasons, it holds the record as The CW's longest-running series and the longest-running fantasy series in American television history. The final season's remaining seven episodes were not aired until October 2020 because the COVID-19 pandemic suspended production; the series concluded on November 19, 2020. Two special documentaries were aired during the series' run: A Very Special Supernatural Special on October 6, 2014, looking back on the first nine seasons, and Supernatural: The Long Road Home on November 19, 2020, reviewing the series' history before the finale.

Supernatural was released for digital purchase on the iTunes Store in late 2006. The CW also released episodes on its website for free for four weeks after an episode's original air date. In late 2009, TNT acquired the syndication rights and reran the show in early 2010. In October 2011, The CW entered a licensing agreement with Netflix that brought the series to the platform and introduced it to a new audience. Because of music licensing issues, many of the original rock songs used in the series were replaced when it was released on the iTunes Store and Netflix.

The series is recognized as a global series, with success outside the US. In the United Kingdom, the series was shown sequentially on ITV, Living TV, and E4, before concluding on 4Music. It was aired on Network Ten in Australia, and for its second season became the first major commercial program made available for free digital download before television transmission. The show was broadcast on Citytv, Space, and M3 in Canada. In Asia, it aired on AXN Asia.

== Reception ==
=== Critical response ===
Supernatural received mixed to positive reviews. On Rotten Tomatoes, the series holds a 93% approval rating from the aggregated reviews of 163 critics over 15 seasons. On Metacritic, it has a weighted average score of 60 out of 100 based on 48 critics throughout its run, indicating "mixed or average".

The show's success and longevity were attributed to the casting and on-screen chemistry between Padalecki and Ackles. (Note: Attributed to USA Today's Brian Truitt, /Film's Jenn Adams, and Esquire's Gabrielle Bruney) USA Today's Brian Truitt wrote that the duo brought "depth, soul, and humor" to their characters, a view shared by /Film's Jenn Adams, who felt their brotherly bond acted as an "emotional hook" for the audience. According to RogerEbert.com's Sheila O'Malley, their rapport and dedication were the series' "ace in the hole". Salon.com critic Melanie McFarland deemed it a reflection of American spirit in its story through underdogs fighting corrupt systems, while Truitt praised its representation of Americana via cross-country road trips. Retrospectively, for Esquire, Gabrielle Bruney singled out the series' first five seasons as its "golden age"; Adams considered the fifth season to be the series' peak.

Critics praised the series for its tonal versatility, standalone episodes, and bold creative risks, especially the self-referential episodes that poked fun at the series, its writing, and the fanbase. (Note: Attributed to /Film's Jenn Adams, Esquire's Gabrielle Bruney, and The New York Times's Mike Hale) Alex McLevy of The A.V. Club and Bruney admired its mix of scares, drama, and adventure; McLevy also praised it for its ongoing dedication to its monster-of-the-week format. Thematically, McFarland lauded the series for exploring and redefining the concept of family, while Variety's Danielle Turchiano praised the show's depiction of found family. O'Malley highlighted the early seasons' dark visuals and their tributes to classic cinema and folklore, while Aja Romano of Vox wrote that the fanbase itself, through its relationship with the production team, helped shape modern geek culture.

Later seasons faced more critical scrutiny. (Note: Attributed to /Film's Jenn Adams, Esquire's Gabrielle Bruney, RogerEbert.com's Sheila O'Malley, Salon.com's Melanie McFarland, and The New York Times's Mike Hale) Mike Hale of The New York Times said the performances lacked polish and the story often felt improvised in its final ten seasons. Bruney noted the increasingly "complicated lore" while Adams and McFarland, respectively, denounced the "tired plot contrivance" and the tendency to "recycle the same tensions between Sam and Dean". O'Malley observed that the series suffered diminishing returns as it became an ensemble show that lost its original grit and focus on the brothers. Commentators criticized the series for a lack of diversity and its persistent whiteness, (Note: Attributed to Esquire's Gabrielle Bruney, Salon.com's Melanie McFarland, and Vox's Aja Romano) and Romano pointed out the early treatment of female characters as expendable. Critics also condemned the series for queerbaiting (Note: Attributed to Esquire's Gabrielle Bruney, Vox's Aja Romano, TV Guide's Sadie Gennis, and PinkNews's Nick Duffy) and using the "bury your gays" trope with Castiel's sudden death after he confesses his love for Dean. (Note: Attributed to /Film's Jenn Adams, Esquire's Gabrielle Bruney, Nerdist's Shelly Jay, and Out's Mey Rude) Adams cited the untimely deaths of fan-favorite characters as a weakness of the series.

Critical reaction to the series' conclusion was divisive. Hale called it "an odd, awkward, maudlin [...] exercise", and Adams described it as "empty" because pandemic restrictions slowed the story's momentum. Truitt questioned the writing behind Dean's death. Romano found the finale "alienating" and noted the lack of the series' recurring female characters. Conversely, McLevy felt it had concluded on a "pretty high note" and Turchiano wrote that in spite of narrative issues, the ending was "hopeful and poetic". IGN's Emily Tannenbaum said the finale was a nostalgic conclusion "worthy of [the show's] legacy".

=== US television ratings ===
Supernatural's first episode in the US attracted 5.69 million viewers, while the first-season episode "Route 666" had the most viewers of the series at 5.82 million. Apart from four episodes in its final season, each episode had more than one million US viewers. On streaming platforms, according to Nielsen TV ratings data from 2020 to 2023, the series was regularly among the 10 most-streamed acquired series in the US, with an annual viewership time of around 18 billion to nearly 23 billion minutes.

Viewership and ratings per season of Supernatural
Season	Timeslot (ET)	Network	Episodes	First aired		Last aired		TV season	Viewership rank	Avg. viewers (millions)	Avg. 18–49 rating
Season	Timeslot (ET)	Network	Episodes	Date	Viewers (millions)	Date	Viewers (millions)	TV season	Viewership rank	Avg. viewers (millions)	Avg. 18–49 rating
1	Tuesday 9:00 pm (1–16); Thursday 9:00 pm (17–22)	The WB	22	September 13, 2005	5.69	May 4, 2006	3.99	2005–06	165	3.81	1.4 (Note: Statistics run from September 19, 2005, through May 7, 2006, leaving out the season premiere.)
2	Thursday 9:00 pm	The CW	22	September 28, 2006	3.93	May 17, 2007	2.72	2006–07	216	3.14	1.1
3	Thursday 9:00 pm	The CW	16	October 4, 2007	2.97	May 15, 2008	3.00	2007–08	187	2.74	1.0
4	Thursday 9:00 pm	The CW	22	September 18, 2008	3.96	May 14, 2009	2.89	2008–09	161 (Note: Statistics run from September 22, 2008, through May 17, 2009, leaving out the season premiere.)	3.14	1.1
5	Thursday 9:00 pm	The CW	22	September 10, 2009	3.40	May 13, 2010	2.84	2009–10	125	2.64	1.2 (Note: Statistics are based on first-run episodes only.)
6	Friday 9:00 pm	The CW	22	September 24, 2010	2.90	May 20, 2011	2.11	2010–11	209	2.42	1.1
7	Friday 9:00 pm	The CW	23	September 23, 2011	2.01	May 18, 2012	1.56	2011–12	176	2.03	0.89
8	Wednesday 9:00 pm	The CW	23	October 3, 2012	1.85	May 15, 2013	2.31	2012–13	152	2.52	1.1
9	Tuesday 9:00 pm	The CW	23	October 8, 2013	2.59	May 20, 2014	2.30	2013–14	141	2.81	1.3
10	Tuesday 9:00 pm (1–14); Wednesday 9:00 pm (15–23)	The CW	23	October 7, 2014	2.50	May 20, 2015	1.73	2014–15	156	2.02	0.8
11	Wednesday 9:00 pm	The CW	23	October 7, 2015	1.94	May 25, 2016	1.84	2015–16	131	2.81	1.0
12	Thursday 9:00 pm (1–8); Thursday 8:00 pm (9–23)	The CW	23	October 13, 2016	2.15	May 18, 2017	1.65	2016–17	132	2.62	0.9
13	Thursday 8:00 pm (Note: The twelfth and thirteenth episodes of the final season aired outside their regular timeslot on Mondays at 8:00 pm.)	The CW	23	October 12, 2017	2.10	May 17, 2018	1.63	2017–18	166	2.32	0.8
14	Thursday 8:00 pm	The CW	20	October 11, 2018	1.49	April 25, 2019	1.30	2018–19	159	2.07	0.6
15	Thursday 8:00 pm	The CW	20	October 10, 2019	1.23	November 19, 2020	1.38	2019–20	116 (1–13) 131 (14–20)	1.86 (1–13) 1.63 (14–20)	0.6 (1–13) 0.5 (14–20)

=== Awards and nominations ===
Supernatural has received three Primetime Emmy Award nominations. At the 58th Primetime Emmy Awards, the series was nominated for Outstanding Music Composition for a Series (Original Dramatic Score) and Outstanding Sound Editing for a Series for its "Pilot" episode. At the 60th Primetime Emmy Awards, it received a nomination for Outstanding Sound Editing for a Series for the third-season episode "Jus in Bello". The show has won nine People's Choice Awards and four TV Guide Awards.

The series earned nominations at the Constellation Awards and won Best Science Fiction Television Series of 2009. It was nominated at the inaugural Critics' Choice Super Awards, where Ackles won the award for Best Actor in a Horror Series; at the Teen Choice Awards where Ackles and Collins won Chemistry and Padalecki won Sci-Fi/Fantasy Actor, both in the Choice TV category in 2015; and for its episodes at the Golden Reel Awards and the Rondo Hatton Classic Horror Awards.

=== Financial dispute ===
In 2017, Kripke and Warner Bros. became involved in an arbitration after Kripke argued that the studio was reporting inaccurate numbers in its accounting for Supernatural. Warner Bros. claimed that the series had a deficit of almost US$23 million after eight seasons, despite significant revenue. Kripke challenged that figure, stating that Warner Bros. was not producing enough information to determine whether licensing fees from streaming services, including Netflix and Hulu, were at market value. In an interview with Deadline Hollywood in 2023 amid the WGA strike, Kripke said that he had not received any streaming residuals from Netflix for Supernatural, unlike his cable residuals. He explained that while he was financially fine, staff writers who depend on that income between jobs were severely impacted by the lack of streaming residuals.

== Cultural impact ==
=== SPNFamily and fan conventions ===
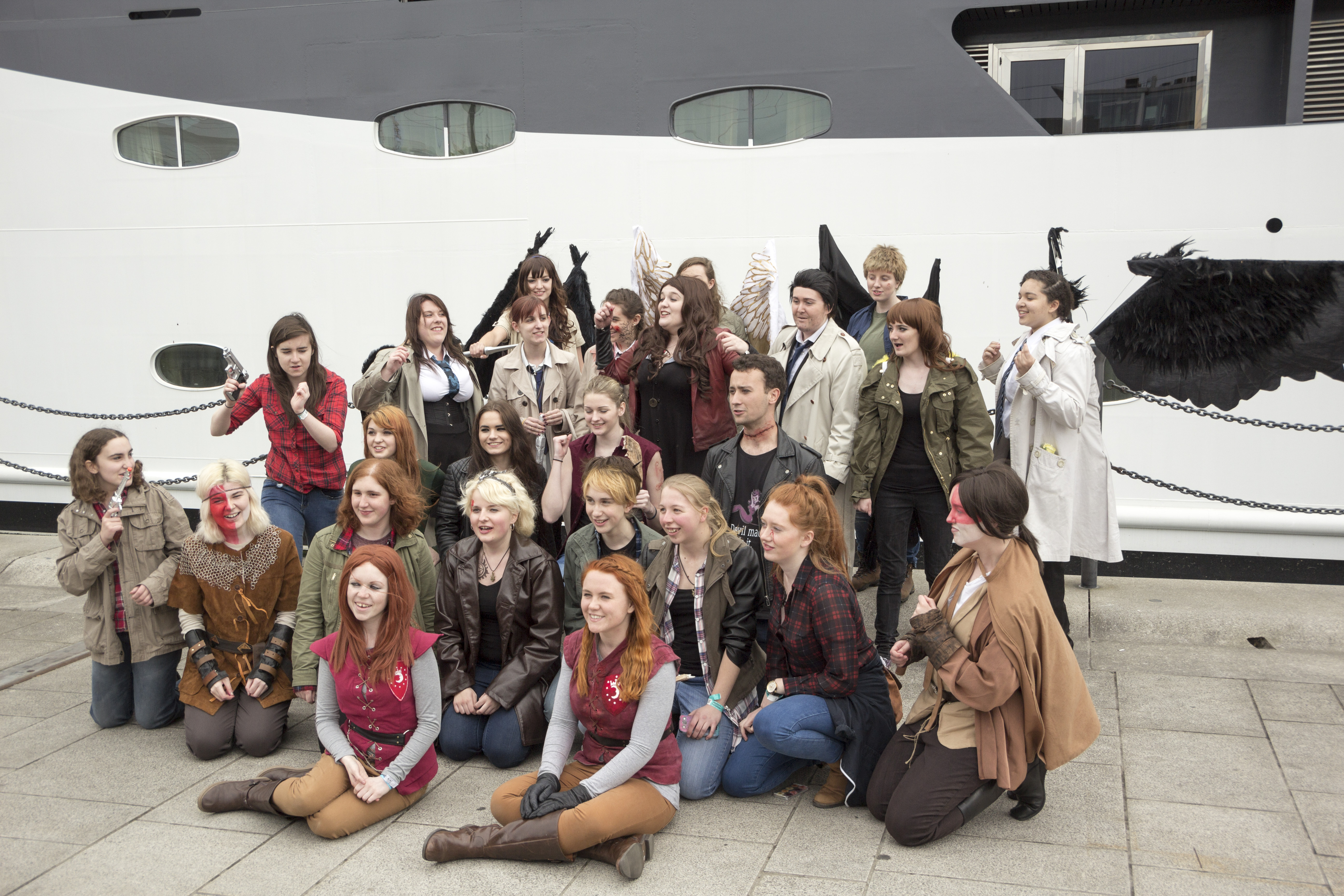
Fans of Supernatural cosplaying as characters from the series.

SPNFamily is the Supernatural fan community; the term was coined by Padalecki to describe the fandom's close connection with its cast. The quote "family don't end with blood" was adopted by the community and has become the fandom's motto. Despite its struggle against cancellation, the show survived thanks to its fanbase in its early years. When Kripke was concerned about the show's renewal, viewers sent postcards and wrote to television critics to advocate for the series and help save it. After the series was dropped from UK television in 2014, fans started a Twitter campaign using the hashtag #UKNeedsSPN. Supernatural fans also tweeted while the series was being broadcast, a practice known as live-tweeting, to give real-time feedback to the producers and help attract new viewers.

Besides average viewership and tie-in merchandise, the show's popularity was reflected in its San Diego Comic-Con panels. Hall H typically booked blockbuster film presentations and rarely scheduled television shows. Following packed panels in previous years, Supernatural received its first Hall H booking in its seventh season and in all subsequent years through 2019, with attendees filling the venue each July. Between 2006 and 2020, more than 250 conventions took place across a dozen countries. Starting in 2008, Creation Entertainment in the US and Asylum in the UK began hosting conventions, with Creation holding them up to twice a month, an unprecedented frequency for a television series. Ileane Rudolph of TV Insider wrote that Supernatural conventions often received praise from attendees for their highly connective nature; the events broke down barriers between the cast and the audience through intimate photo opportunities and interactive sessions.

On June 23, 2018, Austin mayor Steve Adler declared "Supernatural Day" to honor lead actors Ackles and Padalecki, who regularly visited the city. The event was attended by a large crowd of fans and crew from around the US. According to scholar Lynn S. Zubernis, although the show has concluded, portions of the fan community hope this is not its permanent end.

=== The internet era ===
Supernatural and its fandom grew along with the internet after the series debuted in 2005; it arrived at a time when fans were engaging on blogging sites such as LiveJournal, where they shared thoughts, photos, news, and videos. Zubernis noted that LiveJournal communities were tight-knit and more cohesive than communities on earlier message boards, mailing lists, or Usenet boards. The fandom also expanded to other sites such as Archive of Our Own (AO3), Wattpad, Tumblr, Facebook, Twitter (later renamed X), and Instagram.

Tumblr became the platform of choice for many fans; it began to draw them in late 2009 along with the launch of its iPhone app. The Supernatural fandom was particularly active on SuperWhoLock, one of the largest multi-fandom groups on Tumblr. The term was a portmanteau of the names of the three most active fandoms on the platform: Supernatural, Doctor Who (2005–present), and Sherlock (2010–2017). There, fans frequently used GIFs to communicate with each other and exchange jokes across fandoms. The Supernatural fandom was known for its fans' claim that it had "a GIF for everything"; they would hijack unrelated posts with GIFs from the show and behind-the-scenes videos as a way to communicate, express their feelings, assert their identity, and promote the series.

=== Fan creativity ===
According to Zubernis, Katherine Larsen, and Jules Wilkinson, the SPNFamily is a dynamic internet community which arose during the social media boom. Its members actively post on fansites, write fan fiction, draw fan art, and make videos for YouTube. They have a shipping culture, most notably through the pairings Wincest and Destiel.

Wincest, a portmanteau of Winchester and incest, is the pairing of brothers Sam and Dean. Gamble once jokingly noted that the central plotline is "the epic love story of Sam and Dean". The series turned self-reflexive by including fan culture as part of its own story; the main characters discover that fans write romantic fiction pairing them. Shipping also extended to real-person fiction (RPF) about the series' lead actors, known as J2, a portmanteau of Jared and Jensen. J2 is credited with creating the framework for the Omegaverse (ABO) in late 2010, a genre of erotic fiction which includes male pregnancy. Since Castiel's debut in the fourth season, the Destiel pairing (Dean and Castiel) has gained attention in both popular and academic discourse. Subtext between Castiel and Dean, together with suggestive comments from production staff that were never realized in the show, resulted in accusations of queerbaiting from critics and fans.

Ackles and Collins had different opinions on Destiel: the former kept his character Dean separate from romantic interpretations, which author Joseph Brennan analyzed as showing how fanshipping conflicts with traditional, heteronormative portrayals of the character's masculinity, while the latter interacted with and supported fans as a voice for the LGBTQ+ community. In "Despair", the eighteenth episode of the final season, the decision to kill Castiel following his declaration of love for Dean was met with fury from fans, who pointed out that the show had fallen into the "bury your gays" trope. Collins later confirmed that Castiel in fact felt romantic love for Dean. His support of Destiel and LGBTQ+ representation in the show encouraged acceptance within the fandom and helped fans embrace their identities.

=== Philanthropy and political activism ===
Collins used his influence from Supernatural to inspire fans to take part in community service. In 2010, he co-founded and was board president of the nonprofit organization Random Acts, which funded projects such as the construction of an orphanage in Haiti and a high school in Nicaragua. In 2011, Collins created GISHWHES (the Greatest International Scavenger Hunt the World Has Ever Seen) to channel Supernatural fan creativity toward good causes. His initiatives motivated fans to become more active in political and social issues. Scholars Ashley Hinck and Carolyn Hardin wrote that Collins and the fandom together built a civic culture of empathy, transparency, and respect for differences.

In 2015, Padalecki opened up about his experience with depression and anxiety and launched the Always Keep Fighting T-shirt campaign to raise funds to help others who struggle with mental health issues. The next year, he co-created the SPNFamily Crisis Support Network with Collins and Ackles—hosted by their nonprofit partner Random Acts and two other organizations, IMAlive and To Write Love on Her Arms—as a resource for fans and the community struggling with mental health issues. On December 8, 2020, the cast and Kripke reunited virtually for a fundraiser with politician Stacey Abrams to support Fair Fight Action to combat voter suppression and defend voting rights.

The series motivated fans to independently take action on relief and healthcare initiatives. Karla Truxall, a fan of the series, established the nonprofit organization SPN Survivors (Suicide Prevention Network), and the fan organization SPN Rescue was created on Twitter to monitor SOS messages and connect victims of Hurricane Harvey (2017) with rescue services. After the finale, a group of fans used their disappointment to organize fundraising campaigns: the Castiel Project to support The Trevor Project, a suicide prevention hotline for LGBTQ+ youth; the Sam Winchester Project to fund emergency grants for students; and the Dean Winchester Is Love campaign to donate to the National Alliance on Mental Illness (NAMI).

== Other media ==
=== Merchandising and tie-ins ===
The complete 15-season set of Supernatural, titled The Complete Series, was released by Warner Bros. Home Entertainment on DVD and Blu-ray on May 25, 2021. The series had real-world tie-ins while it was airing. Dean's cell phone number (1-866-907-3235) was an actual phone number that connected to a voicemail Ackles recorded in the early seasons. The websites Hellhoundslair.com (first-season episode "Hell House") and ghostfacers.com (fourth-season episode "It's a Terrible Life") were both accessible before 2013.

The franchise has produced merchandise, including toys, apparel, jewelry, and memorabilia. The Supernatural Role Playing Game, a tabletop role-playing game designed by Jamie Chambers, was released by Margaret Weis Productions in 2009. On September 10, 2010, WaterTower Music released the album Supernatural: Original Television Soundtrack – Seasons 1–5, with 18 tracks of original music composed by Lennertz and Gruska.

From 2007 to 2014, Titan Books published companion books written by Nicholas Knight for the first seven seasons, as well as his retrospective visual guide, The Essential Supernatural. Supernatural: Official Magazine was first published on November 27, 2007. Other tie-in books include The Supernatural Book of Monsters, Spirits, Demons, and Ghouls (2007) and John Winchester's Journal (2009) by Alex Irvine, and Bobby Singer's Guide to Hunting (2011) by David Reed, all published by HarperCollins. Entertainment Weekly and TV Guide each published a special Supernatural behind-the-scenes collector's edition.

=== Comic adaptations ===
Comic book series based on the show have been published by WildStorm, DC Comics, and Dynamite Entertainment:

Title	Year	Publisher	Writer(s)	Artist(s)	Ref.
Supernatural: Origins	2007	WildStorm	Peter Johnson	Matthew Dow Smith	
Supernatural: Rising Son	2008	WildStorm	Peter Johnson & Rebecca Dessertine	Diego Olmos	
Supernatural: Beginning's End	2010	WildStorm	Andrew Dabb & Daniel Loflin	Diego Olmos	
Supernatural: The Dogs of Edinburgh	2011	DC Comics	Brian Wood	Grant Bond	
Supernatural	2025	Dynamite Entertainment	Greg Pak	Eder Messias	
Supernatural Valentine's Day Special 2026	2026	Dynamite Entertainment	Preeti Chhibber	Pasquale Qualano	
Supernatural: Sam Winchester	2026	Dynamite Entertainment	Paulina Ganucheau	Kendall Goode	
Supernatural: Dean Winchester	2026	Dynamite Entertainment	Chuck Brown	Rapha Lobosco	

=== Novel adaptations ===
Novels based on the series have been published by HarperEntertainment and Titan Books:

Title	Author	Year	Publisher	ISBN
Nevermore	Keith R.A. DeCandido	2007	HarperEntertainment	0-06-137090-8
Witch's Canyon	Jeff Mariotte	2007	HarperEntertainment	0-06-137091-6
Bone Key	Keith R.A. DeCandido	2008	HarperEntertainment	0-06-143503-1
Heart of the Dragon	Keith R.A. DeCandido	2010	Titan Books	1-84856-600-X
The Unholy Cause	Joe Schreiber	2010	Titan Books	1-84856-528-3
War of the Sons	Rebecca Dessertine and David Reed	2010	Titan Books	1-84856-601-8
One Year Gone	Rebecca Dessertine	2011	Titan Books	0-85768-099-4
Coyote's Kiss	Christa Faust	2011	Titan Books	0-85768-100-1
Night Terror	John Passarella	2011	Titan Books	0-85768-101-X
Rite of Passage	John Passarella	2012	Titan Books	1-78116-111-9
Fresh Meat	Alice Henderson	2013	Titan Books	1-78116-112-7
Carved in Flesh	Tim Waggoner	2013	Titan Books	1-78116-113-5
Cold Fire	John Passarella	2016	Titan Books	978-1-78116-675-8
Mythmaker	Tim Waggoner	2016	Titan Books	978-1-78329-854-9
The Usual Sacrifices	Yvonne Navarro	2017	Titan Books	978-1-78329-856-3
Joyride	John Passarella	2018	Titan Books	978-1-78329-936-2
Children of Anubis	Tim Waggoner	2019	Titan Books	978-1-78565-326-1

=== Rewatch podcast ===
A rewatch podcast titled Supernatural: Then and Now premiered on January 24, 2022, hosted by Benedict and Speight. Ackles and Padalecki guest-starred on the first two episodes.

=== Spin-offs ===
From April to May 2010, a comedy web series consisting of 10 short episodes titled Ghostfacers was released. It starred the amateur ghost-hunting duo Ed Zeddmore and Harry Spangler, who were introduced in the first season of the main series. In 2011, Japanese animation studio Madhouse produced Supernatural: The Animation (スーパーナチュラル・ザ・アニメーション), which became the first anime adaptation of a foreign live-action television series. The 22-episode series reimagined the storyline of the first two seasons of the original series and created new stories that explored the Winchester brothers' childhood.

The CW pursued potential spin-off series via backdoor pilot episodes. Supernatural: Bloodlines (2014) was intended to examine underground monster factions operating in Chicago, and Wayward Sisters (2017) to center on the character of Sheriff Jody Mills. Neither series received a green light from The CW. While working on the third season, Kripke considered a Wild West prequel series about hunter Samuel Colt, but it never materialized.

The Winchesters (2022–2023) was the only spin-off greenlit by The CW. Ackles and his wife, Danneel, executive-produced the prequel, which is about the early lives of Sam and Dean's parents, John and Mary Winchester, and saw Ackles reprise his role as Dean Winchester as narrator. The Winchesters was canceled after one season in May 2023. Erin Giannini wrote that part of the reason for the failed spin-off attempts was that the franchise's success was rooted in the relationship between Sam and Dean, as well as their shared journey.

== See also ==
- List of longest-running American television series
- List of films about angels
