= Supernatural season 3 =

Third season of the TV series Supernatural

Supernatural
- Season 3
- DVD cover art
- Showrunner: Eric Kripke
- Starring: Jared Padalecki; Jensen Ackles; Katie Cassidy; Lauren Cohan
- No. of episodes: 16

Release
- Original network: The CW
- Original release: October 4, 2007 – May 15, 2008

Season chronology
- ← Previous; Season 2 Next → Season 4

The third season of Supernatural, an American dark fantasy television series created by Eric Kripke, premiered on October 4, 2007, and concluded on May 15, 2008. Traveling throughout America, protagonists Sam (Jared Padalecki) and Dean Winchester (Jensen Ackles) use their father's journal to help them carry on the family business—saving people and hunting supernatural creatures. The season begins with the brothers tracking down the demons released from Hell in the previous season finale. They become allies with a demon named Ruby (Katie Cassidy), who claims to know a way to release Dean from his demonic pact—he had sold his soul to a demon and was given a year to live in exchange for Sam's resurrection—and wants to protect them from the new demonic leader Lilith. As Dean's deadline approaches, their efforts are further hindered by Bela Talbot (Lauren Cohan), a professional thief of occult items who is often at odds with the Winchesters.

In the United States the season aired on Thursdays at 9:00 pm ET on The CW television network. The CW ordered 22 episodes for the season, but interference from the 2007–08 Writers Guild of America strike ultimately limited the season to 16 episodes, making this the shortest season of the show by number of episodes. Some storylines were thus postponed, which Kripke felt ultimately benefited the season by forcing the writers to focus on saving Dean. Despite its low ratings—it averaged only about 2.74 million American viewers—the series received an early renewal for a fourth season.

Warner Home Video released the season on DVD as a five-disc box set in Region 1 on September 2, 2008, in Region 2 on August 25, 2008, and in Region 4 on September 30, 2008. The episodes are also available through digital retailers such as Apple's iTunes Store, Microsoft's Xbox Live Marketplace (now Microsoft Store), and Amazon.com's on-demand TV service.

== Cast ==
=== Starring ===
- Jared Padalecki as Sam Winchester
- Jensen Ackles as Dean Winchester
- Katie Cassidy as Ruby / Lilith (Note: Only credited for their respective episode appearances.)
- Lauren Cohan as Bela Talbot

=== Guest stars ===
- Jim Beaver as Bobby Singer
- Sterling K. Brown as Gordon Walker
- Michael Massee as Kubrick
- Cindy Sampson as Lisa Braeden
- A. J. Buckley as Ed Zeddmore
- Nicholas Elia as Ben Braeden
- Jeffrey Dean Morgan as John Winchester
- Richard Speight Jr. as the Trickster / Gabriel
- Travis Wester as Harry Spangler
- Charles Malik Whitfield as FBI Agent Victor Henriksen
- Steven Williams as Rufus Turner

== Episodes ==
In this table, the number in the first column refers to the episode's number within the entire series, whereas the number in the second column indicates the episode's number within that particular season. "U.S. viewers in millions" refers to how many Americans watched the episode live or on the day of broadcast.

No. overall	No. in season	Title	Directed by	Written by	Original release date	Prod. code	U.S. viewers (millions)
45	1	"The Magnificent Seven"	Kim Manners	Eric Kripke	October 4, 2007	3T6901	2.97
Bobby Singer informs the brothers about a supernatural sighting in Nebraska, which turns out to be demonic manifestations of the Seven Deadly Sins. While investigating, they meet Isaac and Tamara, a husband and wife team of hunters. Isaac and Tamara trail one of the demons to a bar where all the patrons are demonically possessed. Isaac dies after being forced to drink drain cleaner. Bobby and the Winchesters crash their car into the building, kidnap Envy, and drive away with Tamara. Later that night, the other Sins track them down. During the scuffle, a mysterious blonde named Ruby saves Sam and kills three demons before departing. The rest of the Sins are exorcised.
46	2	"The Kids Are Alright"	Phil Sgriccia	Sera Gamble	October 11, 2007	3T6902	3.16
Dean reads about a death in Cicero, Indiana, where a man was pushed onto a power saw. Upon arrival in town, Dean goes to visit former lover Lisa Braeden. Ruby visits Sam at a diner and informs him that something happened to all of his mother's friends. Dean calls Sam and reveals that four other "accidents" occurred in Lisa's neighborhood. As he helps Ben, Lisa's son, deal with a bully, Dean suspects Ben maybe his son. Sam investigates one of the accidents and notices the victim's child is behaving oddly. A mark on the mother's neck also catches his attention. Sam suspects that the child is a changeling. The brothers discover the mother changeling is using a vacant house as her base. Inside, they find several children, including Ben, in cages. They kill the mother changeling and all the others explode in flames upon her death. The real children are returned and Dean explains everything to Lisa. Lisa tells a disappointed Dean that Ben isn't his son.
47	3	"Bad Day at Black Rock"	Robert Singer	Ben Edlund	October 18, 2007	3T6903	3.03
Kubrick visits fellow hunter Gordon Walker in prison, and is told that Sam must die due to his inhuman nature. Elsewhere, the brothers retrieve a rabbit's foot stolen from one of their father's storage rooms, only to lose it again shortly thereafter. Bobby informs them that the foot is cursed. Anyone who touches it is granted good luck but will die within a week if the foot is lost. The brothers discover the thieves were hired by a woman named Bela Talbot, who steals supernatural items for profit. Dean retrieves the foot from Bela's flat in Queens. Kubrick tracks Sam down and prepares to kill him, but Dean rescues him. Bela demands the foot, and Dean tricks her into a curse, forcing her to allow the foot's destruction.
48	4	"Sin City"	Charles Beeson	Robert Singer & Jeremy Carver	October 25, 2007	3T6904	3.18
Omens and two unusual deaths lead the brothers to Elizabethville, Ohio, a once-sleepy town that has been turned into a haven for gamblers and drinkers. A hunter named Richie takes them to a local bar to investigate its owner. A fight breaks out and the bartender, Casey, uses the distraction to lure Richie away and kill him. Dean locates the demonically possessed Casey and begins an exorcism, but Casey destroys the book and telekinetically causes the basement entrance to cave in. Casey reveals that her world is in disarray following the demon Azazel's death and Sam's failure to replace him as leader. With the help of local priest Father Gil, Sam finds them just as Bobby arrives. Father Gil, also possessed, breaks into the basement and frees his lover Casey. Despite her pleas, Father Gil sets his sights onto Dean. Sam intervenes and kills both demons with the Colt.
49	5	"Bedtime Stories"	Mike Rohl	Cathryn Humphris	November 1, 2007	3T6905	3.24
In Maple Springs, New York, the vengeful spirit of a young girl causes a series of violent incidents which strangely resemble fairy tales. The girl, Callie, has been in a coma for years and her father, Dr. Garrison, has been reading her fairy tales. Sam and Dean believe that she was poisoned by her stepmother as in Snow White and she has been bringing fairy tales to life in an attempt to draw attention to the crime. An elderly woman is brought into the hospital with injuries consisted of an animal attack, and her granddaughter is kidnapped by her attacker shortly after in the manner of Little Red Riding Hood. Sam explains the situation to Dr. Garrison, who cannot believe that his wife would do such a thing. Callie's spirit appears and confirms Sam's claims. Callie dies and her spirit moves on, freeing the kidnapper from her control. Later that night, Sam visits the Crossroads Demon. She refuses to reveal the name of the demon who can free Dean from his pact and Sam kills her.
50	6	"Red Sky at Morning"	Cliff Bole	Laurence Andries	November 8, 2007	3T6906	3.01
In Sea Pines, Massachusetts, a woman sees a ghost ship in the harbor and mysteriously drowns in her shower later that night. Sam and Dean question the woman's aunt Gertrude, who knows about the ghost ship and asks them if they are working with "Alex." Alex turns out to be Bela. More deaths occur that night, and the brothers realize that the ship is a death omen linked to the spirit of a sailor hanged for treason. The sailor's hand was crafted into a Hand of Glory. Bela suggests that they destroy it to stop the ghost ship. Using tickets provided by Gertrude, the trio attends a lavish function at the local Maritime Museum, where Bela steals the hand, then sneaks away to sell it to a client, which was her goal all along. Bela then sees the ghost ship and turns to the Winchesters for help. The three of them conduct a summoning ritual at the sailor's grave. The vengeful spirit is confronted by the captain who ordered his death and both disappear.
51	7	"Fresh Blood"	Kim Manners	Sera Gamble	November 15, 2007	3T6907	2.88
Sam and Dean interrogate the vampire Lucy and learn that another vampire named Dixon transformed her by spiking her drink with his own blood at a club in Albany, New York. The brothers locate and confront Dixon, but are interrupted by Gordon and Kubrick. Sam and Dean escape, but Dixon kidnaps and turns Gordon. When the brothers arrive at Dixon's hideout, they discover that the vampiric Gordon has escaped. Gordon returns to Kubrick, but kills him in self-defense. Gordon later calls Sam and Dean, threatening to kill a young woman if they do not meet him. They head to the location and find the woman, but Gordon uses a rollerdoor to separate the brothers. The woman is revealed to be a vampire turned by Gordon. While Dean is forced to shoot her with the Colt, Sam decapitates Gordon with a razor wire. The brothers later stop on the side of the road to check a rattling noise made by the Impala, and Dean begins teaching Sam how to repair the car since his time is running out.
52	8	"A Very Supernatural Christmas"	J. Miller Tobin	Jeremy Carver	December 13, 2007	3T6908	3.02
When a being dressed as Santa Claus begins killing people after dragging them up the chimney, the Winchesters head to Ypsilanti, Michigan to investigate. Sam notices that over both victims' fireplaces are the same wreaths made of meadowsweet, an herb often used in pagan rituals to lure gods to a human sacrifice. The brothers track down the makers of the wreaths, a pair of pagan gods posing as the apparently perfect Edward and Madge Carrigan. Knowing that the gods can be killed by evergreen wood, they stab the gods to death with branches of the Christmas tree. Throughout the episode, the brothers debate celebrating Christmas after having skipped the tradition for years. Dean wants to celebrate because it will be his last chance, while Sam does not for the same reason. As the episode ends, Sam decorates their motel room with Christmas paraphernalia.
53	9	"Malleus Maleficarum"	Robert Singer	Ben Edlund	January 31, 2008	3T6909	2.95
Sam and Dean investigate a series of witchcraft-related deaths in Sturbridge, Massachusetts, and believe that the neighborhood book club is actually a coven. Ruby shows up and warns them that a powerful force is controlling the witches and the force will likely target Sam. When Dean is magically attacked, Sam goes after the book club witches with the Colt. The three women deny targeting Dean and claim that they have only used witchcraft for personal gain. Ruby saves Dean from the spell and Sam realizes that Tammi, who has not benefited from the coven, is the demon Ruby warned him about. When Dean and Ruby show up, Tammi incapacitates Dean and reveals that Ruby sold her soul to Tammi centuries before. Dean kills Tammi with Ruby's knife. Later that night, Ruby admits to Dean that she cannot save him from his deal. She confirms that all demons were once humans, but have had their humanity stripped away in Hell, a fate that Dean too will ultimately suffer. Ruby requests Dean's help in preparing Sam for the future.
54	10	"Dream a Little Dream of Me"	Steve Boyum	Story by : Sera Gamble & Cathryn Humphris; Teleplay by : Cathryn Humphris	February 7, 2008	3T6910	2.68
As Sam confronts Dean about the latter's apparent lack of concern over his own fate, he is interrupted by a call from a hospital in Pittsburgh, Pennsylvania explaining that Bobby has mysteriously fallen into a coma. The brothers discover Bobby has been drugged with a plant known as "African Dream Root," which allows a person to enter and manipulate others' dreams. Sam and Dean acquire the dream root from Bela and rescue Bobby. While under the influence of the root, the brothers are then forced to confront their own inner demons. Upon awakening, they find that Bela has stolen the Colt from them. As the brothers prepare to leave to hunt her down, Dean admits that he does not want to die.
55	11	"Mystery Spot"	Kim Manners	Story by : Jeremy Carver & Emily McLaughlin; Teleplay by : Jeremy Carver	February 14, 2008	3T6912	2.97
Sam awakens in his motel room Tuesday morning to Asia's "Heat of the Moment" playing on the radio and finds Dean already up and getting dressed. During breakfast, they discuss the disappearance of a man at the Mystery Spot in Broward County, Florida. That night, they break into the attraction, but are confronted by the owner, who kills Dean with his shotgun. The next morning, Sam finds he and Dean are trapped in a time loop started by the Trickster: the pagan god the Winchesters previously encountered. Over the next 100 Tuesdays, Dean keeps getting killed in various ways despite Sam's attempts to circumvent it. Sam forces the Trickster to break the time loop and the next day, Dean is gunned down in an attempted mugging. With the time loop broken, Dean remains dead and Sam becomes a lone hunter in his search for the Trickster. When they finally meet again, Sam begs the Trickster to bring Dean back to life. The Trickster tells Sam that there was a lesson for the time loop: Dean is Sam's weakness and no matter what Sam does to try and save him, Dean is destined to die. The Trickster eventually restores the timeline to Wednesday with both Dean and Sam intact.
56	12	"Jus in Bello"	Phil Sgriccia	Sera Gamble	February 21, 2008	3T6911	3.23
Bela gets Sam and Dean arrested, with the brothers encountering FBI Agent Henriksen again. While they await extradition at a sheriff's station, they fight off law enforcement personnel who have been possessed by demons. As the boys, Henriksen and the station's survivors fortify the station with salt and devil traps, a horde of demons take control of the local population and surround the station. Ruby warns them that the demons are now following Lilith, a powerful new leader who wants Sam dead. Ruby proposes a spell to kill the demons, but Dean declines the offer because it involves sacrificing both herself and the virgin secretary Nancy Fitzgerald. Instead, they allow the demons inside and play a recording an exorcism through the public address system. Shortly after the brothers leave, Lilith enters the station disguised as a little girl and destroys the building in a blast of white energy, killing everyone inside. Ruby gives Sam and Dean hex bags to hide themselves from demons.
57	13	"Ghostfacers!"	Phil Sgriccia	Ben Edlund	April 24, 2008	3T6913	2.22
Sam and Dean investigate the haunted Morton House in Appleton, Wisconsin, and interrupt the filming of a reality show called Ghostfacers, once again encountering supernatural enthusiasts Harry Spangler and Ed Zeddmore. According to legend, the spirit of Freeman Daggett returns every leap year to bring more victims to the house. The Winchesters join forces with Spangler and Zeddmore and their TV crew to put Daggett's spirit to rest. Before departing the next day, Sam and Dean wipe all of the Ghostfacers footage with an electromagnet.
58	14	"Long-Distance Call"	Robert Singer	Jeremy Carver	May 1, 2008	3T6914	2.63
After repeatedly getting phone calls from a mysterious woman, a man shoots himself in the head. Phone company technician Stewie Meyers reveals the same number has called ten houses over a two-week period. Visits to some of the homes reveal that people have been receiving calls from dead loved ones. Dean receives a call from his father, who claims that the demon holding his contract is in town and later gives him the location. Sam deduces they are facing a crocotta, which has been convincing people to kill themselves so it can devour their souls. He discovers phone company manager Clark Adams is in fact the crocotta. Adams calls another man, pretending to be his dead daughter and claiming that her killer is at the house Dean is waiting in. As Sam manages to kill the crocotta, the man attacks Dean but is overpowered. Dean convinces the man that he is not his daughter's killer.
59	15	"Time Is On My Side"	Charles Beeson	Sera Gamble	May 8, 2008	3T6915	2.55
While on a case in Erie, Pennsylvania, Sam and Dean find out about a local doctor, Dr. Benton, who abandoned his work in 1816 to follow his obsession of finding the key to eternal life. During surgery, Benton would drug people and harvest their internal organs to replace his own. Sam wants to use Benton's research to find a way to extend Dean's life. Sam rescues a woman from the still-living Benton, stealing his research journal in the process. Benton's survival methods are purely scientific and are thus of no use to saving Dean. Doc Benton kidnaps Sam and tries to harvest his eyes, but Dean stops him. The brothers bury Dr. Benton alive. In a subplot, Bela has made a demonic pact (she made it as a child to have her parents killed, thus inheriting their wealth) and she tries to shoot Sam with the Colt in hopes of getting out of it. She reveals that Lilith holds all of the deals; if Dean kills her, he may be able to break his. Ultimately, time runs out for Bela and she is killed by hellhounds.
60	16	"No Rest for the Wicked"	Kim Manners	Eric Kripke	May 15, 2008	3T6916	3.00
With only 30 hours left until Dean's contract ends, Bobby tracks Lilith to New Harmony, Indiana. Ruby claims that Lilith has her guard down and Sam's dormant psychic abilities can easily kill her. The trio find that Lilith is possessing a young girl and terrorizing her family. At the girl's home, Sam finds her sleeping and prepares to strike, but Dean reveals that Lilith is no longer inside her. As midnight approaches, Dean realizes that Lilith has taken over Ruby's host. Claiming to have sent Ruby "far, far away", Lilith pins the brothers down as her hellhound mauls Dean to death. Lilith then blasts Sam with white energy from her hand. Horrified to see that it has no effect, she flees her host before Sam can retaliate. A devastated Sam cradles Dean, whose soul is shown in Hell, hanging from a vast landscape of chains and meat hooks.

== Production ==
=== Casting ===
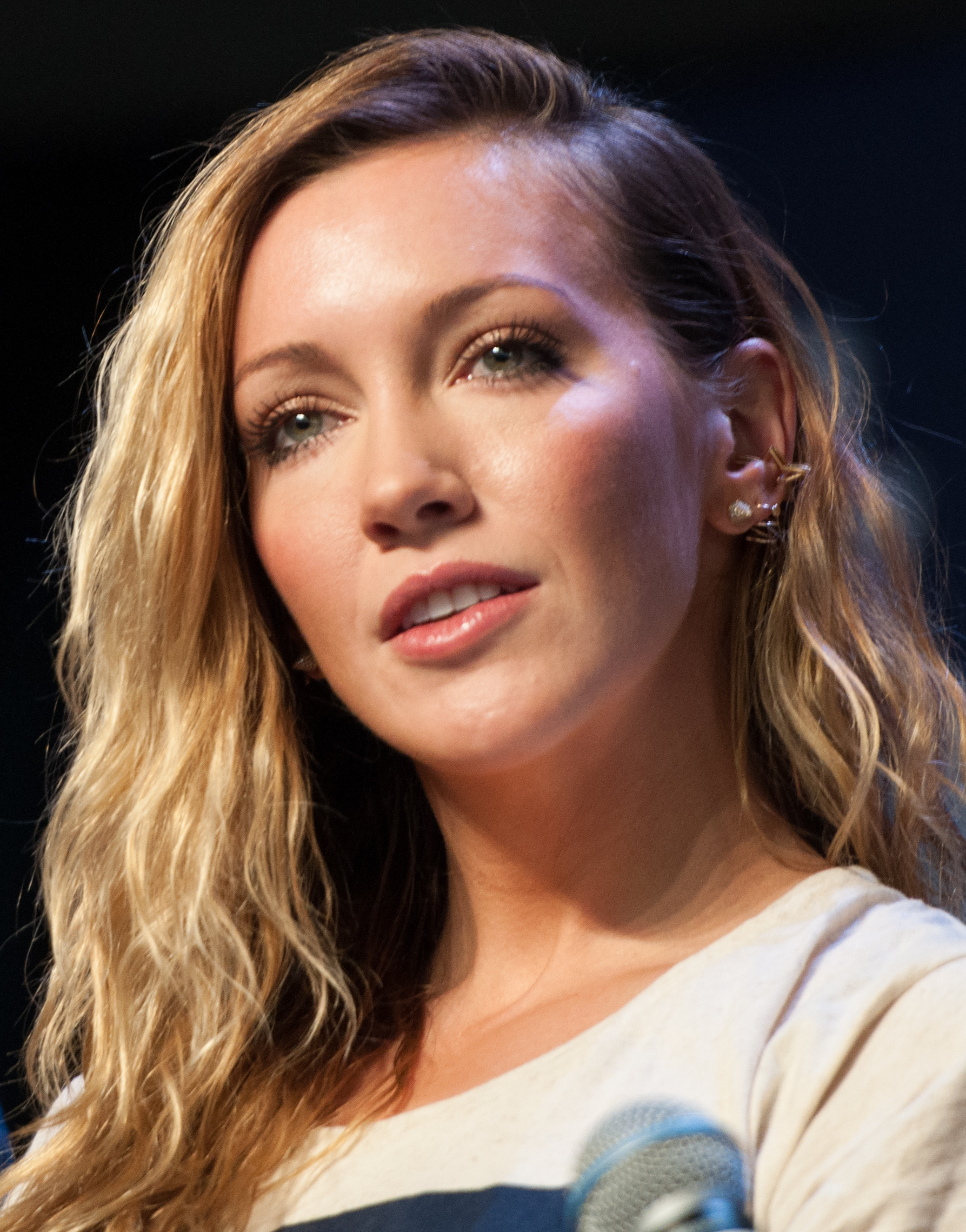
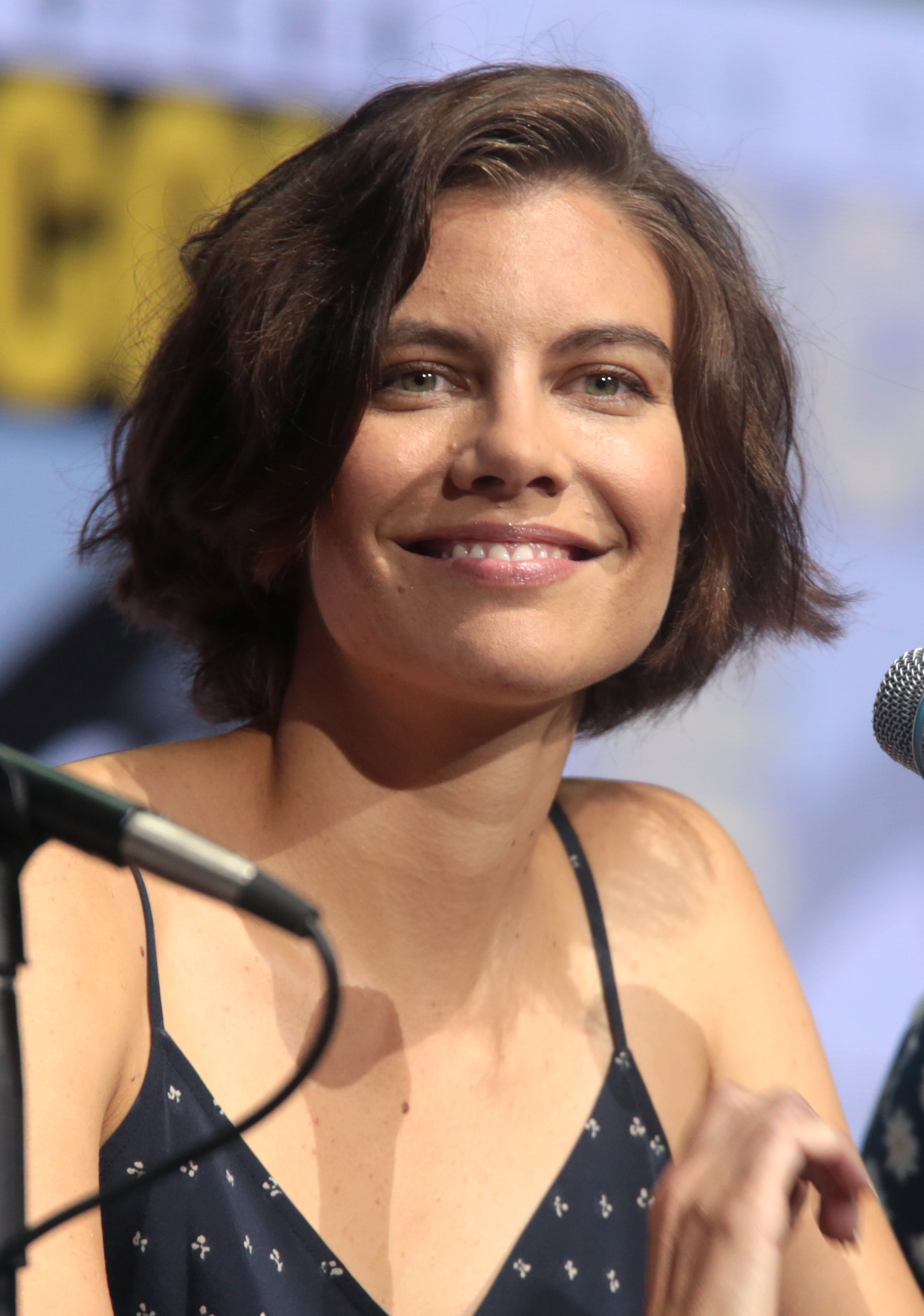
The third season featured the addition of Katie Cassidy (left) and Lauren Cohan (right) to the cast as the demon Ruby and Bela Talbot, respectively.

The third season introduced two new series regulars, both of whom were credited as starring in select episodes. Katie Cassidy portrayed the demon Ruby, who was created to change the perception of demons into more of a grey area, rather than the "black and white", "They're evil, we're good" approach previously used in the series. Likewise, Lauren Cohan's character of Bela Talbot was meant to be "someone [the Winchesters have] really never come across before". Self-serving, she steals mystical artifacts for profit and has no interest in the "altruistic or obsessed or revenge-minded motives of hunting". In response to fan concerns about the characters, series creator Eric Kripke stated, "[Ruby and Bela are] there for important plot elements, but it's not the Ruby and Bela show, nor is it about the four of them cruising around in the Impala together. It's about the guys." Budgetary reasons brought about the replacement of Cassidy for the fourth season, while the character of Bela was removed due to the negative fan reaction.

While there were new faces for the third season, much of the cast carried over from the previous year. Actor Jim Beaver returned as hunter Bobby Singer, and felt the character had grown into a surrogate father for Sam and Dean over time. Richard Speight Jr. returned as the Trickster in "Mystery Spot", as did Travis Wester and A. J. Buckley in "Ghostfacers" as Harry Spangler and Ed Zeddmore. Portraying "bumbling versions" of the Winchesters, Wester and Buckley improvised many of their lines. The writers also considered bringing back Charles Malik Whitfield for a recurring role, with his character, FBI Agent Victor Henriksen, continues his hunt for the brothers throughout the season. Whitfield stated his willingness to relocate to Vancouver, but the writers ultimately went a different direction. Because the threat of being captured by Henriksen looms over the Winchesters all season, the writers wanted to bring the plotline to a close in "Jus in Bello". Kripke suggested that Gamble develop and deepen his character, "give him a great send off, and then kill him...or at least...mostly kill him". With the character last seen being confronted by the demon Lilith, Gamble noted that Agent Henriksen's fate was left ambiguous, and that she herself was uncertain.

Appearances of other characters did not work out as originally planned. Sterling K. Brown made his final appearance as the vampire hunter Gordon Walker in "Fresh Blood" after a brief role in "Bad Day at Black Rock". The character's story arc for the season was intended to be longer, but Brown's commitments to the Lifetime Television series Army Wives limited his return to only two episodes. Filming for the movie Watchmen prevented Jeffrey Dean Morgan from returning in a dream sequence as John Winchester in "Dream a Little Dream of Me", but the actor was able to provide his voice for the episode "Long Distance Call". The 2007–08 Writers Guild of America strike forced the writers to scrap an episode featuring the return of Samantha Ferris as Ellen Harvelle in the middle of the season, and failed negotiations prevented an appearance in the finale.

Some casting choices were influenced by affiliations with the actors and crew. Sandra McCoy, who played a host to the Crossroads Demon in "Bedtimes Stories", began dating Padalecki after working with him on the 2005 film Cry Wolf. Before her appearance on the series she had auditioned for the roles of Jessica Moore, Sam's girlfriend in the pilot episode; Sarah, a love interest for Sam in the first-season episode "Provenance"; and Carmen, Dean's girlfriend in the second-season alternate-reality episode "What Is and What Should Never Be". She believed that, due to her relationship with Padalecki, the production staff were waiting until the "perfect role" arrived before casting her. The role of the immortal Doc Benton was reserved for actor Billy Drago, whom executive producer Kim Manners had previously worked with on the television series The Adventures of Brisco County, Jr.. A fan of Frankenstein-actor Boris Karloff, Drago said of the role, "This was an opportunity to play both Dr. Frankenstein and his creation simultaneously. Instead of creating some immortal monster, he makes himself immortal. This was my chance to pay homage to what I consider one of the great actors of our time". Due to the time required to apply the extensive make-up and prosthetics for the role, Drago ended up with a minimum of 20-hour work days. However, he felt that the sleep deprivation improved his performance because "Benton's immortal and [moving] all the time". Manners also selected his assistant, Kelley Cleaver, to play one of Doc Benton's victims.

=== Writing ===
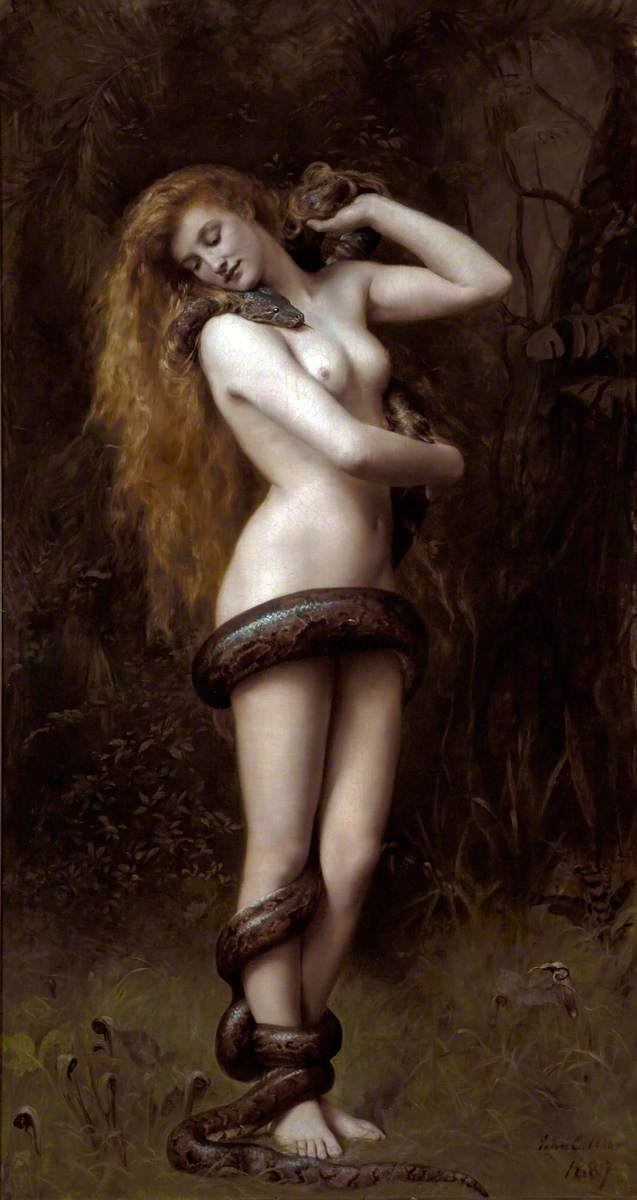
Lilith by John Collier, 1887. The demon Lilith, "a combination of all myths concerning Lilith", was introduced to refocus the demon mythology.

For the third season, Kripke and the writing staff tried to mix the style of the "simple, pure, emotional" first season mythology with the "intensity" of the second season's self-enclosed episodes. Kripke noted that Dean's demonic deal of the previous season provided the writers with "a lot of effective emotional context to play with". The writing for Sam focused on the character growing up in order to support Dean, making the character more independent as he begins to realize that Dean will not be around forever; Dean, however, acts immaturely to hide his fear of going to Hell, and eventually learns for himself that he is worth saving. Kripke described the season's storylines, including the self-enclosed episodes, as "very cross-cultural". He commented, "We borrow from every world religion, every culture. The cosmology of the show is that if a legend exists about something somewhere out there in the world, it's true. So you really have this cross-pollination of different demons, different creatures, all from different religions."

With the demon Azazel—the main antagonist of the first two seasons—dying in the second-season finale, demons as a whole became the primary villains of the third season. This excited the writers because the mythology became "just about all of these different demons and all the different things demons do". The revelation that demons are in actuality the corrupted souls of humans was instituted for two reasons: it not only "opened up the mythology in an interesting and complicated way" by implying that demons are "not just black and white" and that "dark evil can exist in the human heart under the right conditions", but it also served as character development for Dean by showing him what he will one day become in Hell.

A reflection of terrorist cells, the demonic war against humanity is mainly depicted in the third season through small groups of demons working independently. On this aspect, Kripke commented, "They were not necessarily organized, and there was a danger in that, that they could be everywhere. Each one has a different motive." The studio voiced its belief that the series was "suffocating" because it had "just these two guys and these creepy little rooms", and suggested that the writers "open up the scope of the story and make things more epic" following the "epic kind of scope" associated with the second-season episodes "Hollywood Babylon" and "All Hell Breaks Loose". With this in mind, the writers decided to depict the war as large-scale. Though Kripke warned that doing so would cost much more money, the studio gave its blessing to exceed the allotted budget. However, the season premiere came in "way, way over budget", prompting the studio to change its mind. Kripke noted that this had ramifications for the season, and commented, "All season we've been promising this demon war, but due to the fact that we don't have $20 million an episode, we really have to pick and choose when we're going to show the battles of that war."

As time passed, Kripke felt that the terrorist-cell format was not working out as planned, partly because he prefers writing based on old legends rather than current topics. In his opinion, the season did not hit its stride until the seventh episode because the first six were bogged down by budget problems and an ambiguous mythology. To stabilize the demon storyline, the writers introduced a new lead villain, with Kripke finding it "refreshing to get back on firm ground where you knew there was a bad guy and you knew there was a plan". They were uncertain for a while as to who the new demon leader would be, and gave the character the working title of Zarqawi during the planning stages. Gamble insisted that the demon be female, and suggested that she be the mythological Lilith. The debate then shifted to whether Lilith should be a woman or little girl, with the writers eventually settling on the latter because they found it creepier.

Only 12 episodes were made before production was sidelined by the 2007–08 Writers Guild of America strike. Regarding the final four episodes before the hiatus, Kripke noted, "We were just getting to a point in our storyline when we were really starting to ramp up the mythology and really ramp up both the pace and the size, the story events that happened, both in terms of the mythology and in terms of the lives of the characters. We started rolling with that, and you'll see the increased momentum and increased intensity in these four episodes." Because the possibility existed that production would not resume until the fourth season, the writers reordered the final two episodes; "Jus in Bello", which reintroduced the demon war under Lilith's command and had an "epic sweep to it", became the final episode instead of "Mystery Spot" to establish a "jerry-rigged season climax".

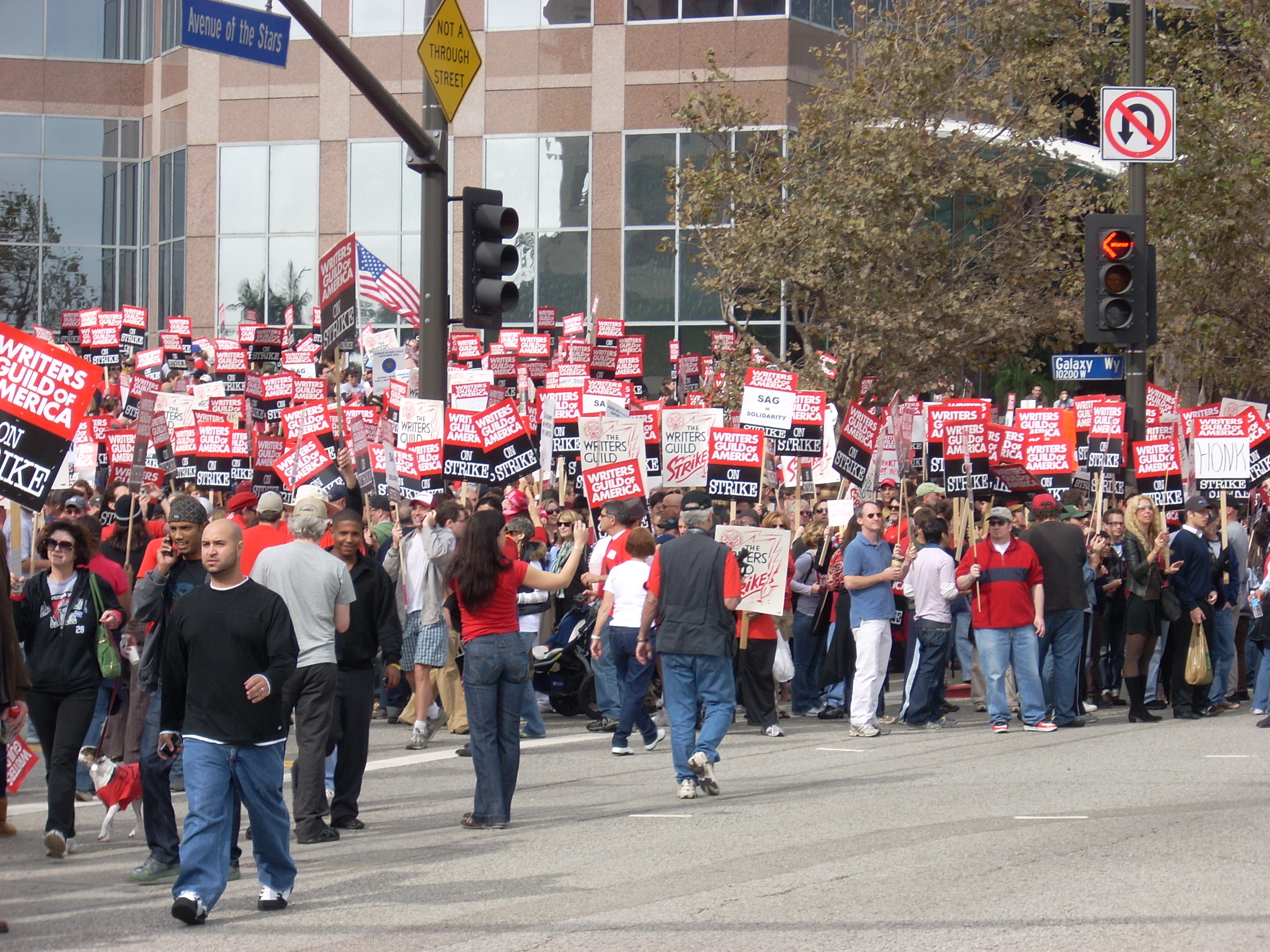
The season was cut short by 6 episodes due to the 2007–08 Writers Guild of America strike.

When the strike ceased, only four more episodes were produced. This forced the postponement of many planned expansions of the series mythology, such as Mary Winchester's connection to Azazel and the escalating demon war. A major deviation occurred with the development of Sam's demonic abilities. The writers intended for him to save Dean from Hell, possibly even before the season finale, by giving into his demonic powers and becoming "this fully operational dark force" who would then want to go after Lilith. However, the strike prevented the writers from fleshing out his evolving abilities, and the story arc was pushed back into the fourth season. Despite this, Kripke felt the strike's effects ended up making the series "meaner, leaner, and more concise", as they were able to focus the remaining episodes onto "the storyline [they] needed to pay off"—Dean's demonic pact. He also pointed out that the strike gave the writers and actors a much-needed break, reenergizing them for the final episodes and subsequent season.

Many episodes featured independent stories, which attain closure at the end of each episode and add little to the overarching storylines. Certain aspects of these were inspired by real-life events. According to Gamble, the birth of Kripke's child caused the writing staff to start "thinking about how creepy babies are". This led to the decision to base an episode around changelings—infant creatures who are exchanged with human babies. The writers chose the deviate from folklore, making the changelings older in "The Kids Are Alright" to avoid having Sam and Dean blowtorching babies. The title of the episode "Malleus Maleficarum" references the Middle Ages treatise of the same name detailing how to deal with witches; this decision stemmed from the intended plot of the episode, which involved a small town initiating a witch hunt. In the end, a demon would have been revealed to be framing the women in order to create chaos. However, the writers felt the story was too similar to "Sin City", and instead had the demon Tammi turn a group of women into witches. The episode's sequence in which a character finds maggots in his hamburger was inspired by Kripke's "horrific" discovery of a maggot-covered possum in his garbage can.

Other stories were developed from simple concepts. Writer Ben Edlund desired to write a "screwball comedy" that did not feature any monsters. Kripke was "enamored" with the idea, and it evolved into the rabbit's foot episode "Bad Day at Black Rock". The concept of the curse box—a container for the rabbit's foot that "magically [cuts] off the cursed items from the rest of the continuum"—was based on Pandora's Box. The episode "Sin City" was originally only meant to be written by Jeremy Carver, who pitched a concept similar to the film Enemy Mine—Dean would be trapped with a demon in a wine cellar. However, he realized that the second half would mainly feature a conversation between Dean and the demon and would deeply delve into demon mythology. Carver sought help, and Robert Singer agreed to write the scenes for him. Singer enjoyed humanizing demons and presenting their point of view. For "Mystery Spot", the story development fell into place during the writing process. It started off as a Groundhog Day-concept—the same day repeating for a character—which was then expanded into repeatedly killing Dean. The decision to make it into another Trickster episode brought it all together.

=== Filming ===
Principal photography took place in Vancouver, British Columbia. Because the series uses few standing sets, set designer Jerry Wanek often constructed entirely new sets for each episode. He often followed specific themes, especially with the Winchesters' lodging. For example, the Spanish-looking motel room of "Malleus Maleficarum" was inspired by the Procol Harum song "Conquistador". Because the town of "Sin City" was intended to be a New Orleans/Las Vegas hybrid, the episode's motel-room theme was "a little more flamboyant" with a color scheme of "old Las Vegas". At times, however, Wanek was able to reuse old sets, such as with the refurbishment of "The Magnificent Seven"'s bar for "Sin City".

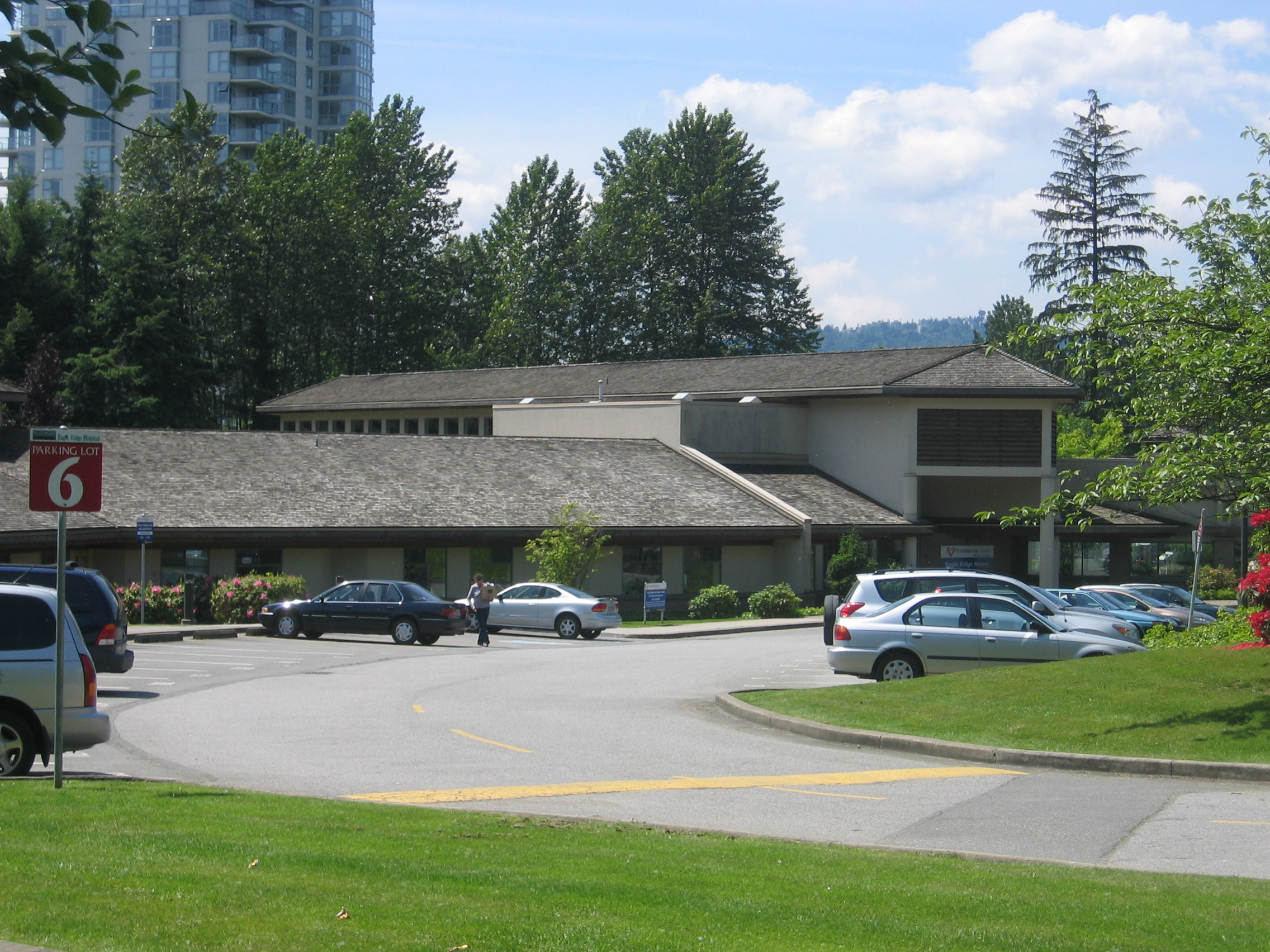
Bobby's hospital scenes in "Dream a Little Dream of Me" were filmed at Eagle Ridge Hospital in Port Moody.

Not all scenes could take place in the studio, and some were instead shot on location. Parts of "Sin City" were shot in Langley, British Columbia; production was only given control over part of the main street, so traffic was driving by during filming. Both "Red Sky at Morning" and "Bedtime Stories" used Burnaby's Heritage Park; it functioned as a cemetery for the former, while the latter used it as the site of a giant gingerbread house. It took three days to build the house along a gravel-road trail, and the greens department added in foliage. The house was designed to be more of a cottage to avoid appearing too surreal. Unfortunately for McCoy, the crossroads scenes of "Bedtime Stories" were filmed at night in the freezing cold. The actress' wardrobe consisted only of an "almost nonexistent" dress, which made her "miserable". Though she found the experience to be "a lot of fun", McCoy had a serious case of stage fright working with Padalecki. She was too emotional to run her scenes beforehand with him, and even at one point during filming had to excuse herself to craft service to "eat and cry like the emotional girl [she] was that night".

Some aspects of the storylines were conceived on set during filming. Lisa's kiss with Dean at the end of "The Kids Are Alright" was unscripted; director Phil Sgriccia convinced actress Cindy Sampson to do so because he wanted to see how Ackles would react. Sgriccia also added in similarities between Dean and his possible son Ben, such as having them both look down at same moment after being scolded, and both checking out the "hot mom and the hot little girl" in unison. This was to make them appear to be, as Kripke noted, of "similar mind and body".

To the production staff's chagrin, the network requested a "more colorful look" for the third season. Director of photography Serge Ladouceur commented, "I went along with it and made it work. The dark scenes were still shot dark, so we were cautious in keeping the direction of our show." While the new lighting became normal for the season, other methods atypical to the series were also used. The knife-fight sequence that introduces Ruby in "The Magnificent Seven" was shot at 120 frames per second. This high rate allowed for the scene to be sped up or slowed down during post-production. Filming for the reality-show themed episode "Ghostfacers" featured no crews on the set; the actors instead carried their own cameras and lighting. Padalecki found it "pretty liberating" because he did not have to worry about finding his marks or making sure not to block people from the camera.

=== Wardrobe ===
Costumes for the season were designed by Diane Widas. For the character of Ruby, Widas used dark tones to better hide her in shadows. Her wardrobe consisted of pleather jackets and narrow jeans to allow the actress to be more active. Child actor Nicholas Elia, who portrayed Dean's potential son in "The Kids Are Alright", was meant to look like a "Little Dean". Widas intended to make a smaller version of the canvas three-quarter jacket that Dean wears, but she ended up finding another jacket that was ultimately used. Other wardrobe designs were influenced by episode themes, with the villains of "A Very Supernatural Christmas" wearing "very campy" Christmas sweaters. For the costumes of "Sin City", Widas noted that "passion colors—purples and oranges and reds—were brought into the mix to create that 'anything goes' feeling". For "Bad Day at Black Rock", production designer John Marcynuk included a rabbit in every scene that involved an act of good luck, such as a Vietnam veteran wearing an embroidered rabbit patch.

=== Effects ===
To depict the supernatural aspects of the show, the series makes use of visual, special, and make-up effects, as well as stuntwork. Visual effects is an in-house department, and is supervised by Ivan Hayden. The opening scene of "The Magnificent Seven" featured the most demons clouds of the first three seasons; Hayden noted that the army cloud consisted of hundreds of individual demons. The episode "Mystery Spot" heavily relied on visual effects for Dean's various death sequences by making use of a computer-generated 3D model of Ackles. Because of the episode's light tone, they were not afraid to make the effects silly, such as by showing Dean's skeleton when he is electrocuted.

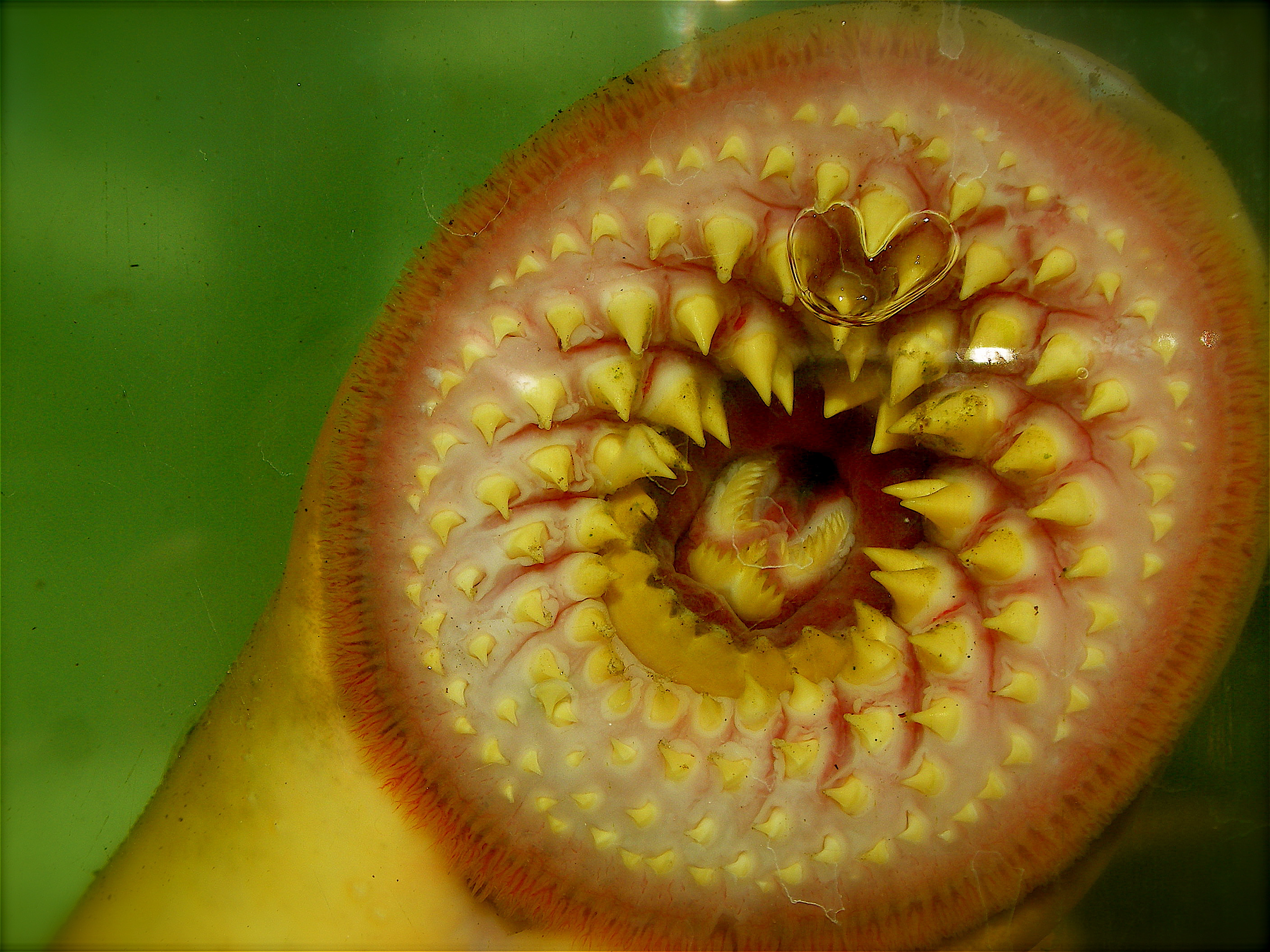
The visual effects department modeled the changelings' mouth after that of a lamprey, which has a similar feeding method.

For the changelings in "The Kids Are Alright", Kripke merely instructed Hayden to make the children's faces pale and have dark circles beneath their eyes. Hayden, however, felt they could do more, and modeled the appearance after a lamprey. They also attempted to base the design in reality by applying real-world evolution. With a flat face, they reasoned that its nose would have retracted and its eyes would have receded for protection, eventually shriveling up and disappearing over time.

Though the script for "Red Sky at Morning" described the confrontation between the ghostly sailors as "they collide into a swirling vortex that disappears", Kripke and Singer ultimately left creative control up to Hayden. Production filmed each element of the sequence separately, with the cemetery itself taking place at Heritage Park. A separate plate used exploding water balloons shot at 1,000 frames per second; this high frame rate allowed for the use of slow motion. The layers were then composited into a single sequence, with the elements transitioning into 3D models of the characters and water after the initial collision.

Special effects were also a major aspect of production. For example, hydraulics were used in "The Magnificent Seven" to break the devil's trap on the ceiling, and required two takes to film. When the ceiling did not fully crack the first time, it took 45 minutes to take out the ceiling and replace the hydraulics. The same episode also depicts a car crashing into a bar. The department cabled the car to a large decelerator—a "big shock absorber"—so that they could drive the car fast but not worry about hitting the cameraman. Costs, however, sometimes hindered the use of effects, such as in "Red Sky at Morning". The spirit's first victim would have drowned after her shower fills with water, and a later scene would have depicted a similar death in a car. When production determined that they could not afford these set pieces, the writers reduced the ghost's ability to merely drowning his victims through touch. The spirit attacks Bela in the episode's climax, which made use of a contraption built by special effects makeup artist Tony Lindala; a tube connected to a denture on the off-camera side of Cohan pumped out large amounts of water, creating the illusion that she is vomiting it out.

=== Music ===
The mostly synthesized orchestral score of the season was composed by Christopher Lennertz and Jay Gruska. The pair try to base the music on the visuals of each episode, with about a third of each episode's score being newly written for the supernatural legend. For example, Lennertz penned distinct music for each Sin in "The Magnificent Seven", with a "slow, lumbering, creepy low-end thing" theme for Sloth. As part of Ruby's introduction in the same episode, he scraped a quarter against a cymbal to create a scraping metal sound that was "a little otherworldly". Lennertz feels that "people associate the sound of violins with vampires" due to the "connection with Eastern Europe and counts", and used a "very violin-heavy" score for "Fresh Blood".

Unusual for the series, co-executive producer Ben Edlund contributed to the music of "Ghostfacers". The writer of the episode, Edlund penned the reality show's theme song before he even pitched the concept to Kripke. Lennertz and Edlund sang the theme song and played guitars, intending to make it the "silliest theme song [they] could come up with". The score was treated like it was a reality show, so Lennertz used "really cheesy synthesizers" to mimic reality show music, and made it "sound lame on purpose".

In addition to the score, the series makes use of rock songs, with most being selected from Kripke's private collection. Rock songs are also usually featured in "The Road So Far" montages at the beginning of select episodes that recap previous events. The premiere used AC/DC's "Hells Bells", while the finale recapped the entire season to Kansas' "Carry On Wayward Son".

== Reception ==
Supernatural did well with viewers aged 18–49. In this category, it ranked eighth of all returning series broadcast by a major network. Overall it ranked No. 187 relative to the position of other prime time network shows. Despite its average viewership of 2.74 million Americans, the show received an early pickup for its fourth season.

Critical reception to the season has generally been mixed. The review aggregator website Rotten Tomatoes reported an approval rating of 88% with an average score of 6.1/10, based on 8 reviews.

Tim Janson of Mania felt the season moved "at a breakneck pace", describing the viewing experience as "being on a trail speeding headlong into the unknown". Giving the season a grade of an "A", he praised the writers for avoiding becoming "one-dimensional" even after introducing so many demonic villains, and also added that they "did a good job" in including self-enclosed episodes despite the writers' strike. Diana Steenbergen of IGN somewhat disagreed, and gave the season a score of 8.4 out of 10. Although she generally enjoys season-long story arcs, Steenbergen felt that Dean's time limit signified to viewers that the plotline would not be resolved until the season finale. With this mindset, the middle episodes "feel like they are treading water". She found the season premiere to be "pretty boring", but called "Jus in Bello" to be "one of the best episodes of the year, maybe even of the show itself", because it begins with an "epic battle" setting but still "focuses on the personal level of the Winchesters and the people around them". Also praised was the character growth for the brothers, such as Sam's exploration of his darker side. Because Dean is usually portrayed as having a "tough, bravado filled exterior", she liked to see Ackles "go deeper" during his character's many "earnest conversations" with Sam. The "likeable secondary characters" of Charles Malik Whitfield's Agent Henrickson and Jim Beaver's Bobby Singer were welcomed back. While there were "a number of good episodes", Maureen Ryan of the Chicago Tribune pointed out the "few outright clunkers" such as "Red Sky at Morning". With a lack of a "compelling unifying concept or theme"—Ryan found demons to always be a threat and felt that Dean's deal didn't carry the "same weight" as later arcs did—she posited that the third season "wasn't the show's finest hour". Combining the effects of the strike with The CW's attempts to interfere, she deemed the season "rockier than Seasons 2 or 4". Airlock Alpha's Julie Pyle criticized the season's brighter lighting, calling it "Supernatural Lite". Fans, too, had mixed feelings for the season. Common complaints, in comparison to the first two seasons, included a reduction in rock music, "intensity", and "snappy dialogue".

Regarding the introduction of Ruby and Bela, critics generally had negative views. Steenbergen had hoped that more female characters "would make things interesting", but ultimately found them to be "wasted characters" that were "unlikable and manipulative" and "usually made our heroes look stupid". While Pyle deemed Cohan a "quite talented" actress, she noted that the character "feels forced into each episode". By the middle of the season, fan reaction to Bela and Ruby also tended to be negative. Many described them as "badly written and badly acted" characters that detract from the Winchesters' brotherly relationship, though some did deem the women "interesting".

Work on the episode "Jus in Bello" garnered the sound editors (Note: Michael E. Lawshe, Supervising Sound Editor; Norval 'Charlie' Crutcher III, Supervising ADR Editor; Karyn Foster, Dialogue Editor; Marc Meyer, Supervising Sound Effects Editor; Timothy Cleveland, Sound Effects Editor; Paul J. Diller, Sound Effects Editor; Albert Gomez, Sound Effects Editor; Casey Crabtree, Foley Artist; Michael Crabtree, Foley Artist; Dino Moriana, Music Editor) an Emmy Award nomination in the category of "Outstanding Sound Editing For A Series", while "Ghostfacers" received a GLAAD Media Award nomination in the category of "Outstanding Individual Episode (in a series without a regular LGBT character)".

== Home media release ==
The third season was released as a five-disc Region 1 DVD box set in the US on September 2, 2008, a month before the premiere of the fourth season. Including all 16 episodes of the third season, the set also featured DVD extras such as bloopers, episode discussions by the writers, a featurette on the various effects used on the show, and a digital copy of the season. The set was ranked No. 6 in DVD sales for its week of release, selling 104,979 units for $4,093,131. It slipped to No. 18 the following week with 35,593 units for $1,387,771. Though sales increased in the third week—40,034 units for $1,560,926—the set fell to No. 19, and was bumped off the top-30 list by the fourth week. The season was also released in Region 2 on August 25, 2008, and in Region 4 on September 30, 2008. A three-disc, region-free Blu-ray box set was later released on November 11, 2008.
