= Fresh Blood (Supernatural) =

- Supernatural episode
- Episode no.: Season 3 Episode 7
- Directed by: Kim Manners
- Written by: Sera Gamble
- Cinematography by: Serge Ladouceur
- Editing by: Anthony Pinker
- Production code: 3T6907
- Original air date: November 15, 2007

Guest appearances
- Sterling K. Brown as Gordon Walker; Michael Massee as Kubrick; Matthew Humphreys as Dixon; Mercedes McNab as Lucy

Episode chronology
| ← Previous "Red Sky at Morning" | Next → "A Very Supernatural Christmas" |
- Supernatural season 3

"Fresh Blood" is the seventh episode of the paranormal drama Supernatural's third season on The CW, and is the show's fifty-first episode overall. The episode was written by producer Sera Gamble and directed by executive producer Kim Manners; it was first broadcast on November 15, 2007. The narrative follows the series' protagonists Sam (Jared Padalecki) and Dean Winchester (Jensen Ackles) as they have their final confrontation with hunter Gordon Walker (Sterling K. Brown), who has been turned into a vampire.

It also features the demise of recurring antagonist Gordon Walker. Brown, who was forced to leave the show due to commitments to the Lifetime Television series Army Wives, was horrified at Gordon's actions in the episode. Mercedes McNab of Buffy the Vampire Slayer and Angel fame made a cameo appearance, and was also busy filming the television series Reaper during the episode's production.

The episode received ratings near the season average, and garnered generally positive reviews from critics. Brown's performance was praised, as well as the twist in his character's storyline. Also applauded were both Sam's confrontation with Dean over his recent reckless behavior and the resulting reconciliation at the episode's end. Many critics found the presence of character Bela Talbot (Lauren Cohan) in the episode to be pointless, while the critic for TV Guide enjoyed McNab's cameo and wished it had been longer.

== Plot ==
Hunter Gordon Walker (Brown), who believes that Sam Winchester (Padalecki) will one day turn evil and become involved in a demonic war against humanity, escapes from prison. He tracks down Bela Talbot (Cohan)—a thief and frequent thorn in the Winchesters' sides—and threatens to kill her unless she reveals the location of the brothers. She refuses at first, but eventually acquiesces in exchange for a priceless mojo bag. Meanwhile, Sam and Dean (Ackles) capture the vampire Lucy (McNab), who has previously taken two victims. They interrogate her, and discover that another vampire named Dixon spiked her drink with his own blood at a club, transforming her. Dixon had taken her back to his home, but she escaped to feed. Lucy, still believing she has only been drugged, is then killed by Dean, as there is no known cure for vampirism.

The brothers locate and confront Dixon, but are interrupted by Gordon and fellow hunter Kubrick. Sam and Dean escape, but in the mayhem, Dixon kidnaps Gordon. The vampire later explains to Gordon that hunters killed his nest, and now he wants to rebuild his family. Though Dixon had planned on using Gordon as food, the hunter's continuous taunting prompts him to feed him his blood. When the brothers—having been informed by Bela of Gordon's location, which she discovered via Ouija board—arrive at Dixon's hideout, they discover that the vampiric Gordon has escaped. Elsewhere, Gordon returns to Kubrick. He requests that he be allowed to live long enough to deal with Sam. Despite this, Kubrick attempts to kill him, so Gordon retaliates by punching into his guts.

As night approaches, the brothers have not been able to find Gordon. Dean decides to go after Gordon while Sam stays hidden, but Sam refuses. He then confronts Dean about his reckless behavior since his deal with a Crossroads Demon, which left him only a year to live. Dean claims that he is not scared of his impending death, but Sam challenges this. Dean eventually relents, agreeing to behave more like his old self again. The two then prepare to wait out the night.

Gordon later calls Sam and Dean, threatening to kill a young woman if they do not meet him. They head to the location and find the woman, but Gordon uses a roller door to separate the brothers. The woman is revealed to be a vampire turned by Gordon, and Dean is forced to shoot her with the Colt—a mystical gun capable of killing anything. He then attempts to help Sam, but Gordon prepares to bite him. Sam prevents this and garrotes Gordon with a razor wire, decapitating the vampire. Sam and Dean later stop on the side of the road to check a rattling noise made by the Impala. Sam is confused when Dean starts explaining the engine's problem. Dean, however, reasons that Sam should know how to fix the car when his remaining time runs out, and also notes that, as his older brother, he should be showing him the ropes.

== Production ==
=== Guest stars ===
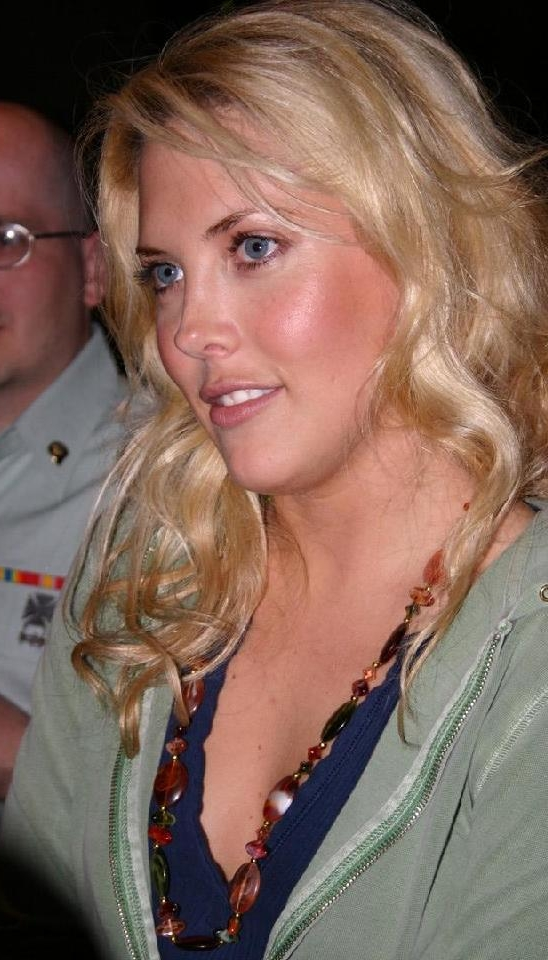
Mercedes McNab was at first reluctant to take on the role, stating, "How many times can you really play a vampire? It's pretty silly!"

"Fresh Blood" featured the final guest appearance by Sterling K. Brown as the vampire hunter Gordon Walker. The character's story arc for the season was intended to be longer, but Brown's commitments to the Lifetime Television series Army Wives limited his return to only two appearances. The episode was "really hard" for the actor; though he was fine with the character dying, the idea of Gordon turning an innocent girl into a vampire was "horrific" to him. Although Gordon's actions in previous episodes were questionable, Brown had always believed the character to be "ultimately good". On this change, Brown commented, "His endgame is to kill Sam, and anyone else who has to experience detrimental effects because of that is not a concern of his. That was tough for me to process and get on board with." However, series creator Eric Kripke reasoned that the character was now a monster and should follow his instincts instead of logic. The writer of "Fresh Blood", Sera Gamble, also penned Gordon's initial episode and helped Kripke conceptualize the character. She felt that she "lucked out" in being able to write the character's final appearance, and found there to be "something so satisfying about turning him into a vampire and chopping his head off with a razor wire". Brown said that "My most favorite [onscreen death] was on Supernatural, where I became a vampire hunter... but then I got bit by a vampire and so I had to die by being beheaded. That was a good time. That was fun."

Mercedes McNab, well known for portraying the vampire Harmony Kendall on the television series Buffy the Vampire Slayer and Angel, guest starred as the recently turned vampire Lucy. Although hesitant to play another vampire, McNab came to realize that the character was less of a vampire and more of a "girl who woke up and was basically drugged or was changed and didn't know what was going on". The actress also noted that Harmony was generally used for comic relief, whereas Lucy was intended to be "serious and more dramatic". Her previous experience with director Kim Manners on the television series The Adventures of Brisco County, Jr. also influenced her decision. Because many of her recent characters tended to die, McNab was delighted by Lucy's offscreen death. The actress was also working on an episode of Reaper during the filming of "Fresh Blood", and the Supernatural production staff was able to fit her into the shooting schedule. The actress found them to be "really helpful" in making sure that her scenes did not take too long to film. Her portion of the opening scene took only a few hours to shoot, allowing her to return to Reaper the next morning.

Michael Massee returned as the hunter Kubrick, who believes himself to be on a mission from God to kill Sam Winchester. Massee discussed his character with Brown beforehand, and envisioned him as a long-time friend of Gordon who could be depended upon. Brown described Kubrick as a "well-meaning ...sweet guy", and noted that his wife had a "visceral response" to the character's death when later viewing the episode. Matthew Humphreys portrayed the vampire Dixon, and considers him a "deeply misunderstood" character. The actor found it "easy to rationalize what he did" because Dixon was at odds with how to start his own family as a vampire, and he maintains that the character had no evil intentions behind his actions. Humphreys hopes to one day return to the role.

=== Filming ===
Principal photography took place in Vancouver, British Columbia. The opening sequence was filmed outside at night, though the subsequent scene—Lucy's interrogation and execution—occurred in a motel set constructed on a sound stage. Atypical to the series, the motel room did not have a noticeable theme. Production designer John Marcynuk commented, "That motel room was essentially a killing floor for the boys ... and it was kind of a cold interrogation scene, so we tried to keep it not so friendly. When you walked through it, it definitely felt like a place [where] a murder had been committed. It wouldn't have been the first time a murder had been committed in that room, either. It was the type of place where bad things happen." Marcynuk took a different approach for Gordon's death scene, utilizing green tones and a cool color palette to create a greater visual contrast with the blood.

=== Effects ===
To lend a strong air of realism to Gordon's death, the scene was created by combining various special effects during filming with post-production visual effects. Plastic razor wire with blood tubing aided in the initial phases of the decapitation; it would slightly sink into Brown's neck as pressure was applied, forcing out the fake blood. For the aftermath, Brown laid down on the floor, and the visual effects department removed his head from the shot and recreated it as a three-dimensional model. The department decided to "push it a little bit farther" by having the head rocking into place and the mouth twitching, but Standards and Practices found it too graphic and forced them to remove the motion. Established in the first-season episode "Dead Man's Blood" were the shark-like teeth of vampires, and the design has been subtly improved with each vampire episode. Though the special effects makeup department used molds of the actors' mouths to create the fanged acrylic dentures, McNab noted that it was very difficult to speak while wearing them. Blood-like makeup around the actors' mouths helped to round out the vampiric visages.

=== Music ===
The synthesized orchestral score of the episode was written by Christopher Lennertz. He feels that "people associate the sound of violins with vampires" due to the "connection with Eastern Europe and counts", and thus used a "very violin-heavy" score for the episode, avoiding woodwinds, brass, and piano.

== Reception ==
=== Critical response ===
In its original broadcast, "Fresh Blood" was viewed by an estimated 2.88 million viewers. The episode received generally positive reviews from critics. Tina Charles of TV Guide praised the episode, commenting that "it was really nice to get an enjoyable episode high on intensity, brotherly interaction, blood and gore". Although she had grown a "tad bit weary" of the character's continuous attempts to kill Sam, she was still "really sorry to see Sterling and Gordy go". Charles felt that his transformation was a "good twist", and liked that his "black-and-white beliefs" remained the same even after becoming a vampire. She also enjoyed the character of Lucy and her "really sad" ending, and wished that McNab's role had been larger. It was noted that the "brotherly interaction was front and center", and Charles was "beyond happy" that Sam confronted Dean about his behavior. The "moment that [she had] been waiting for all season long" finally came to be when Dean took Sam seriously and actually listened to him instead of replying with sarcasm. Charles also deemed the final scene with the brothers to be "just heartbreaking". Likewise, Karla Peterson of The San Diego Union-Tribune not only gave the episode an A+, but ranked it as the sixth-best episode of the 2007-2008 television season. She praised writer Sera Gamble and director Kim Manners for "creating the best bonding scene we've had all season", and lauded Padalecki and Ackles for "making us care so much and believe so fully that a scene like this can leave us gasping".

Brett Love of TV Squad posited that Gordon's return in the "great" episode was "well worth the wait". He noted that the revelation that Lucy was just an innocent girl was a "nice twist", and deemed it a "great choice" to have Gordon turned into a vampire. Love was sad to see Gordon depart from the series, finding the "outstanding" Brown to be "so intense and committed" to the role. However, he considered Bela's appearance to be unnecessary, and pointed out the implausibility of it being easier for Gordon to track down Bela than it would have been to just track down the Winchesters. Like Love, Julie Pyle of Airlock Alpha believed Bela's appearance "[felt] forced". She was saddened by the deaths of Gordon and Kubrick, and had hoped that their storylines would have been further explored. Pyle also criticized the episode's lighting, commenting, "With the added gore this season, the show should seem darker. Instead, it's like 'Supernatural Lite'." While Maureen Ryan of Chicago Tribune found the concept of Gordon hunting down Sam to be "inspired", she noted that "'Fresh Blood' didn't do much for [her]".

=== Analysis ===
Recalling the demon Azazel's comments about the recently resurrected Sam in the episode "All Hell Breaks Loose, Part Two"—that what came back may not be "one hundred percent pure Sam"—Don Williams of BuddyTV questioned if something really is wrong with Sam. Williams added Gordon's death to his list of Sam's recent out-of-character actions, which already included Sam's brutal execution of Jake Talley in "All Hell Breaks Loose, Part Two" and his killing of the Crossroads Demon in "Bedtime Stories". However, he did point out that both characters "kind of deserved to bite the dust". Peterson, too, noted the "cold, dead look in Sam's eyes" after the killing. On the other hand, Padalecki posited that the "darker side of Sam" was depicted when he killed Gordon "with pure hatred", but reasoned that Sam was thinking, "He's a vampire! He's killing people; it's time for him to go."
