= Dream a Little Dream of Me (disambiguation) =

"Dream a Little Dream of Me" is a 1931 song by Fabian Andre, Wilbur Schwandt, and Gus Kahn.

Dream a Little Dream of Me may also refer to:

- "Dream a Little Dream of Me" (Grey's Anatomy), a 2008 television episode
- "Dream a Little Dream of Me" (Supernatural), a 2008 television episode

== See also ==
- Dream a Little Dream (disambiguation)
