= A Very Supernatural Christmas =

- Supernatural episode
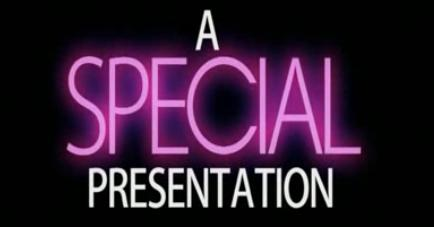
- Series creator Eric Kripke insisted on including the above sequence—originally used by CBS in the 1980s—to maintain the feel of a traditional Christmas special.
- Episode no.: Season 3 Episode 8
- Directed by: J. Miller Tobin
- Written by: Jeremy Carver
- Cinematography by: Serge Ladouceur
- Editing by: Tom McQuade
- Production code: 3T6908
- Original air date: December 13, 2007

Guest appearances
- Colin Ford as Young Sam Winchester; Ridge Canipe as Young Dean Winchester; Spencer Garrett as Edward Carrigan; Merrilyn Gann as Madge Carrigan; Emily Holmes as Mrs. Walsh

Episode chronology
← Previous "Fresh Blood"	Next → "Malleus Maleficarum"
- Supernatural season 3

"A Very Supernatural Christmas" is the eighth episode of the paranormal drama television series Supernatural's third season. It was first broadcast on The CW on December 13, 2007. The narrative follows series protagonists Sam (Jared Padalecki) and Dean Winchester (Jensen Ackles) as they confront a pair of pagan gods (Spencer Garrett and Merrilyn Gann) who annually take human sacrifices.

Written by story editor Jeremy Carver and directed by J. Miller Tobin, the episode was intended to be "the most violent Christmas special in the history of television". Flashbacks were added to the plot when the main storyline came up short, allowing the writers to expand upon the childhoods of a young Sam (Colin Ford) and Dean (Ridge Canipe).

While critics universally praised the flashback sequences and the performances of Ford and Canipe, they had differing opinions of the main storyline.

== Plot ==
As the episode opens, a man visits his grandson for Christmas in Seattle, Washington. He dresses up as Santa Claus, but is pulled up the chimney and slaughtered by a mysterious figure. One year later, Sam (Padalecki) and Dean Winchester (Ackles) pose as FBI agents to investigate a disappearance in Ypsilanti, Michigan. The discovery of a bloody tooth in the fireplace leads Sam to suspect that an evil version of Santa—many world lores tell of those who punish the wicked during Christmas—is at work. As the brothers search the town and debate about whether to celebrate Christmas that year—Dean insists while Sam refuses—another man is taken by a Santa-dressed being. Upon investigation the following day, Sam notices that both families have the same wreath over their fireplaces. The wreath is found to be made of meadowsweet, an herb often used in pagan rituals to lure gods to a human sacrifice, which leads Sam to believe that they are dealing with Hold Nickar, the god of the winter solstice. Dean later admits that he wants to celebrate Christmas since it will be his last chance to—his demonic pact with a demon in "All Hell Breaks Loose, Part Two" only left him with one year to live. Sam responds that he cannot sit around celebrating and pretending that everything is okay while knowing that Dean will not be alive the next Christmas.

Further investigation and research lead the brothers to Edward (Garrett) and Madge Carrigan (Gann), an apparently perfect couple whom Dean later refers to as "Ozzie and Harriet"; the makers of the meadowsweet wreaths, the Carrigans lived in Seattle a year prior. Realizing that the couple are actually pagan gods, Sam and Dean break into their home, finding human remains in the basement. However, they are captured by the Carrigans and tied to chairs in the kitchen. The gods reveal that they have been attempting to blend into human society, reducing their annual sacrifices to only a few. They begin preparing Sam and Dean to be sacrificed, but are interrupted by a neighbor at the front door. When the Carrigans return, they find that the brothers have broken free. Knowing that the gods can be killed by evergreen wood, Sam and Dean stab them to death with branches of the Christmas tree. Later on, Dean is surprised to find that Sam has decorated their motel room with Christmas paraphernalia. They exchange gifts, all which were bought from the local gas station, and happily watch a football game on TV.

Throughout the episode, flashbacks depict a young Sam (Ford) and Dean (Canipe) on Christmas Eve of 1991; with their father out on a hunt, the brothers are staying alone in a motel room until he returns. As Sam wraps an object he obtained from Bobby Singer as a present for his father, he begins to question Dean about what their father is doing. Although Dean brushes him off, Sam reveals that he has read their father's hunting journal. Dean acquiesces, and confirms that their father hunts monsters. This revelation terrifies Sam, who is afraid that the monsters will come after them. Later that night, Dean wakes Sam up and claims that their father briefly returned and left presents. When Sam's gifts end up being a Barbie doll and a sparkly baton, Dean admits that he stole them from a nearby house. Despite this, Sam appreciates what Dean tried to do for him, and gives him the gift meant for their father—the amulet necklace that Dean has worn ever since.

== Production ==
=== Writing ===
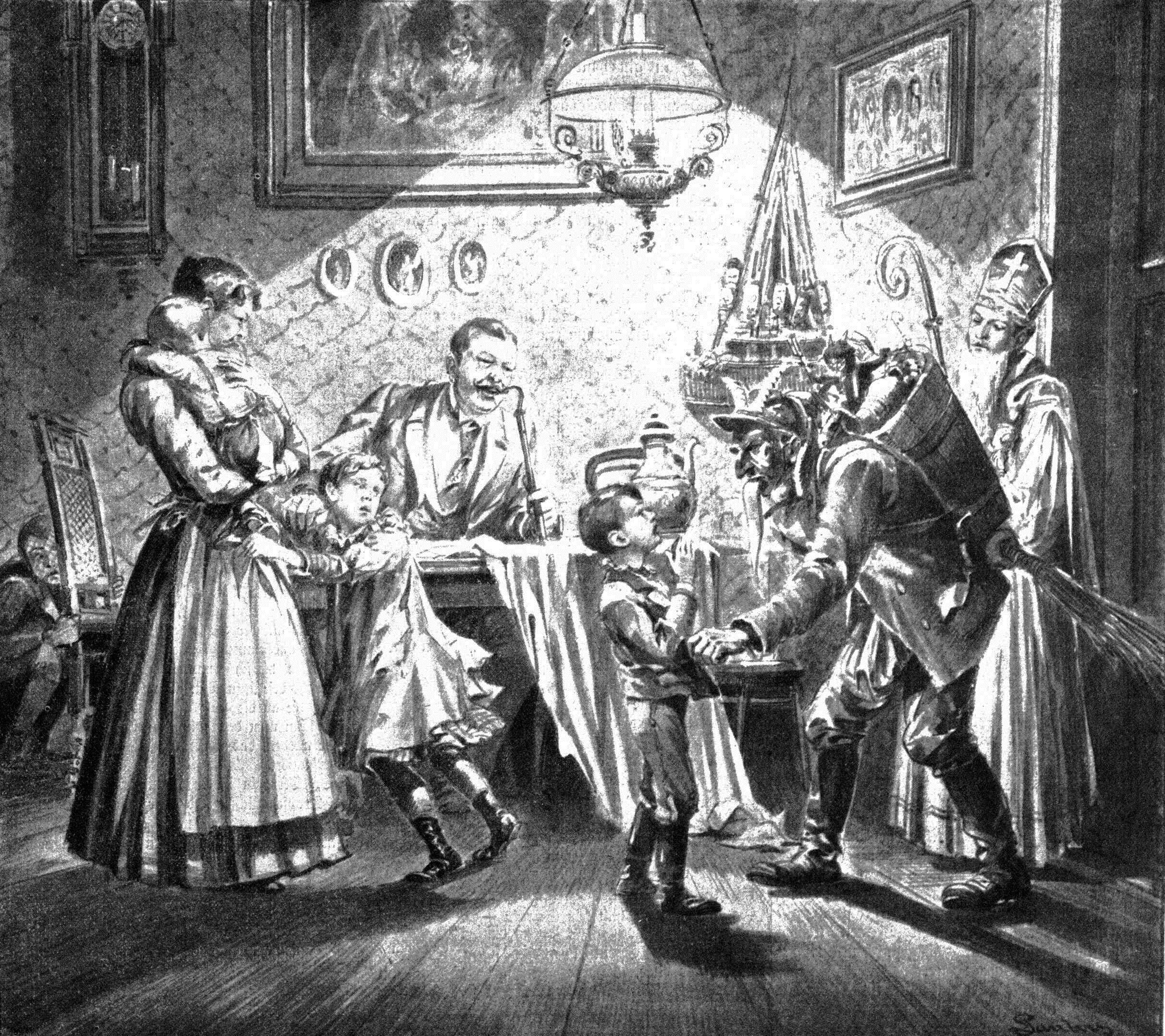
Krampus is one of the anti-Clauses mentioned in the episode.

A fan of Christmas television specials growing up, series creator Eric Kripke desired to make "the most violent Christmas special in the history of television". The myth of the anti-Claus—an evil antithesis of Santa who "stuffs his victims in sacks and takes them off to eat them"—became the episode's inspiration. However, the writers were hesitant to establish the creature as an anti-Claus because it would implicate the existence of an actual Santa Claus. To remedy the dilemma, they incorporated the mythology of the pagan god Hold Nickar, who generally is believed to be the precedent of Santa. Kripke proudly noted that the lore is "one of [their] most accurate" since most Christmas traditions have pagan origins.

Though the episode itself was penned by Jeremy Carver, the writing staff contributed their ideas to the storyline. Within five minutes of brainstorming, they envisioned three scenes they had to do: the teaser, where a grandfather pretending to be Santa is pulled up the chimney and slaughtered; a boy witnessing the Santa-dressed villain brutally killing his father and then eating one of the cookies for Santa; and the Winchesters killing someone with a Christmas tree.

=== Flashbacks ===
The initial draft of the script focused solely on the brothers' attempts to kill the pagan gods; when the episode came up short, Edlund suggested the addition of flashbacks to Sam and Dean's childhood. The narrative device provided two revelations: the origins of Dean's necklace, and the "beginning of Sam's estrangement from his father and his indoctrination into the supernatural world". Kripke noted that the staff loves to delve into the Winchesters' childhoods, and deemed it "too good an opportunity to pass up" to be able to depict how Sam "lost his innocence". Child actor Ridge Canipe reprised his role as a young Dean, while Colin Ford made his debut as a young Sam. Ford had not viewed the series prior to his audition, but watched the first season to research his character.

=== Christmas theme ===
Principal filming took place in Vancouver, British Columbia, and many visuals were influenced by the holiday theme. The "very festive, warm Christmas tones" of the Carrigans' home were intended by set designer Jerry Wanek to create a contrast with the brothers' "little coal-burning old motel". Diane Widas created the costumes, and had fun making the Carrigans' Christmas sweaters "very campy"; Edward's sweater was originally going to be "over-the-top" with 3D snowmen. Because Santa and his elves worked in a "very tired little theme park", the elves were given "ill-fitting" costumes; though new, they were altered to look "shabby". The Santa's "grungy" appearance reflected his drunken state.

Despite the dark storyline, Kripke found it important to maintain the "trappings of ... a really cheery, traditional Christmas special". The spinning "A Special Presentation" title at the beginning of the episode was used by CBS in the 1980s, and Kripke was adamant on including it. Though it was very difficult to find who created and scored it, they eventually received permission. Keeping to the holiday theme, the episode shied away from the usual rock-heavy soundtrack, and instead featured Christmas songs remade in different styles by composer Jay Gruska.

=== Effects ===
Visual effects shots often are produced but ultimately unused, and the episode was no exception. After Madge is killed, the script describes Edward as screaming her name "in all his godlike glory". The visual effects department interpreted this literally, and had him transforming into a tree creature, "all wooden and gnarled". However, it was deemed "a little too on the nose".

== Reception ==
On its initial broadcast, the episode was watched by 3.02 million viewers. It received mixed reviews from critics. Julie Pyle of Airlock Alpha "really enjoyed" the "well directed, well written" episode, and "[giggled] with glee in anticipation of each ghastly Christmas nightmare". Although she continued her criticism of the third season's brighter lighting, she deemed it overall "another Christmas tradition to watch every year with our Charlie Brown Christmas DVDs". Tina Charles of TV Guide enjoyed the monster of the week, but was "hooked" on the brothers' storylines. She noted that Ford's casting as a young Sam was "perfect", and felt that Canipe's performance as a young Dean had improved since his previous appearance in the first season. Likewise, Maureen Ryan of the Chicago Tribune called it one of the "gems" of the third season. However, Karla Peterson of The San Diego Union-Tribune disagreed, and gave the episode a C−. While she enjoyed the flashback sequences and praised Canipe and Ford for their "fierce little performances", Peterson posited that the main storyline "seemed slapped together" and the pacing "felt sluggish". Overall, she found it to be "your basic TV fruitcake—a dense combination of half-baked dialogue and stale storytelling studded with chewy bits of sentimentality".
