= Dream a Little Dream of Me (Supernatural) =

- Supernatural episode
- Dean encounters his love-interest Lisa within his dream. The writers wrote the character into the script just days before filming after they were unable to clear the rights to feature fictional serial killer Jason Voorhees.
- Episode no.: Season 3 Episode 10
- Directed by: Steve Boyum
- Story by: Sera Gamble; Cathryn Humphris
- Teleplay by: Cathryn Humphris
- Cinematography by: Serge Ladouceur
- Editing by: Anthony Pinker
- Production code: 3T6910
- Original air date: February 7, 2008

Guest appearances
- Jim Beaver as Bobby Singer; G. Michael Gray as Jeremy Frost; Cindy Sampson as Lisa Braeden; Elizabeth Marleau as Karen Singer

Episode chronology
← Previous "Malleus Maleficarum"	Next → "Mystery Spot"
- Supernatural season 3

"Dream a Little Dream of Me" is the tenth episode of the paranormal drama television series Supernatural's third season. It was first broadcast on The CW on February 7, 2008. The narrative follows series protagonists Sam (Jared Padalecki) and Dean Winchester (Jensen Ackles) as they enter the dreamscape to rescue the comatose Bobby Singer (Jim Beaver).

Developed by producer Sera Gamble and Cathryn Humphris, the episode was written by the latter and directed by Steve Boyum. It delves into the backstory of Bobby, and also features a major turning point in Dean's search for self-worth. Many dream sequences had to be altered due to production issues, though series creator Eric Kripke believes it ultimately benefited the episode.

Critics gave generally positive reviews that praised Ackles for his dual performance and the production staff for their work on the dream sequences. However, they heavily criticized the actions of character Bela Talbot (Lauren Cohan).

== Plot ==
Within a dreamscape, hunter Bobby Singer (Beaver) searches around an old house and is suddenly attacked by a woman (Elizabeth Marleau). A maid tries to no avail to wake him up in his motel room. Meanwhile, Dean Winchester (Ackles) finds his brother Sam (Padalecki) drinking at a bar in the middle of the afternoon. When Dean questions him about it, a drunken Sam admits that he is upset about not being able to save Dean from his demonic pact, which left him only a year to live. What bothers Sam even more is that Dean, who has little self-worth, is not even concerned about his fate. Their conversation is interrupted by a call from the hospital.

After the brothers visit Bobby, who is in an unexplainable coma, they search his motel room and find a newspaper article about a doctor who suffered a sleep-related death. Dean visits the doctor's office, and learns that he was conducting secret dream experiments for his study on sleep disorders. Dean tracks down Jeremy, a young man who was part of the sleep study because he could not dream. While they talk, Jeremy offers Dean a beer, and he drinks it. Jeremy (G. Michael Gray) reveals that the experiment allowed him to dream by drinking a yellow tea, but the dreams scared him so much that he dropped out of the study. Sam, who has been busy conducting research, later tells Dean that a plant known as "African Dream Root" allegedly allows a person to enter and manipulate others' dreams; they believe someone killed the doctor in this manner and is now targeting Bobby. As a terrified Bobby hides in a closet within his dream, Dean suggests to Sam that they themselves use the dream root to save him.

The brothers contact Bela Talbot (Cohan)—a thief and frequent thorn in the Winchesters' sides—to supply them with dream root. She enters the motel room wearing a trench coat, and removes it to reveal the lingerie underneath. She begins to passionately kiss Sam, and they lie on the bed. However, Sam is soon awakened from his dream by Dean, and Bela arrives moments later. She gives them the dream root without argument—she claims Bobby saved her life in Flagstaff—but is then kicked out. The brothers use the root to make tea, and soon find themselves in a clean version of Bobby's house. Sam goes outside into brightly lit scenery of flowers and singing birds, but becomes locked out of the house. Inside, Dean locates Bobby, who does not believe that he is dreaming. A woman with stab wounds approaches them, and Bobby reveals that she is his wife. Years prior, she became possessed, and Bobby was forced to stab her because he did not know how to exorcise the demon from her; her death led him to become a hunter. As Sam is attacked outside by an angry Jeremy, Bobby takes control of the dream, and they awaken.

Bobby explains that the man who attacked Sam is Jeremy Frost; he was unable to dream because his father brutally hit him in the head with a baseball bat. The target's DNA is a required ingredient for the dream-root tea, and Jeremy acquired Bobby's by offering him a beer. Dean realizes that he made the same mistake. Vulnerable to Jeremy, they both stay awake for two days while attempting to track him down. Unable to endure it any longer, Dean goes to sleep to face Jeremy, and Sam uses the dream root to enter his dream. The brothers encounter a dream version of Lisa Braeden (Cindy Sampson)—Dean's former love interest—outside on a blanket with a picnic basket. She invites Dean to join her, and tells him that she loves him before disappearing. Though Dean denies ever having that dream before, it is an obvious lie. Sam then sees Jeremy nearby and chases after him, and Dean finds himself in a long hallway. He enters his motel room, and comes face-to-face with a dream version of him; he is his own worst nightmare. The Dream Dean comments on the real Dean's feelings of worthlessness and self-loathing; he also deems Dean to be as "mindless and obedient as an attack dog", noting that his possessions, personality, and motives all stem from his father. When the Dream Dean calls him a "good soldier and nothing else", the real Dean reacts violently and exclaims that he did not deserve the burdens that his father put onto him and that he does not deserve to go to Hell. The real Dean shoots his doppelganger with a shotgun, but he returns to life as a demon. The Dream Dean taunts him that he cannot escape his fate, and reminds him that exposure to Hell will transform him into a demon.

Elsewhere, Sam finds and confronts Jeremy. The latter manipulates the dreamscape to his favor, but Sam retaliates by summoning the form of Jeremy's father. A terrified Jeremy is distracted, and Sam kills him with a baseball bat. The brothers then awaken from their dreams. When they find that Bela lied about Bobby saving her life, they realize that she stole the Colt—a mystical gun capable of killing anything—from them. As the brothers prepare to leave to hunt her down, Dean admits that he does not want to die. Sam promises him that they will figure out a way to save him.

== Production ==
=== Conception ===
Deemed by series creator Eric Kripke to be his homage to the film Dreamscape, the episode was the culmination of many previous pitches. Series writer Sera Gamble had been suggesting a dream-based episode since the show's first season, but it was not until the third season that the writers found the concept feasible. Although Cathryn Humphris was selected to pen "Dream a Little Dream of Me" due to her position on the writers' rotation, she was teamed with Gamble to develop the story. On this pairing, Humphris commented, "I think that we complement each other well. Sera's great at the really scary moments, and I think I'm pretty good at some of the connective tissue and putting stuff together in the larger landscape."

=== Writing ===
"Dream a Little Dream of Me" delves into the backstory of hunter Bobby Singer. The writers always knew his history would be "grounded in family". Reflecting this, the original teaser depicted the supernatural deaths of Bobby's children; while eating dinner with his family, his children's throats are supernaturally slit, and they would ask him, "Why, daddy, why did you let this happen?" However, the writers could not determine where to go from there. Following Humphris' earlier pitch of Bobby being an expert exorcist because of a previous failed exorcism, the focus changed to Bobby's torment about killing his demonically possessed wife.

Other planned dream sequences were drastically altered due to production issues. One such scene, made to look like 80's-style film stock, had Dean being confronted by serial killer Jason Voorhees of the Friday the 13th film series. After production cleared the rights to use the character, Kripke made everyone view Friday the 13th: The Final Chapter to help them create the "perfect facsimile" of Jason. However, the film studio that had granted permission realized a few days before filming that it did not actually own the rights. In dire need of a new concept, the writers recalled Sam's dream sequence with Bela; since Sam is revealed to be a "horn dog" underneath, the writers wanted Dean to be the opposite. Dean secretly desires a normal family, so they had Cindy Sampson reprise her role as Lisa Braeden—Dean's love interest from "The Kids are Alright". On retrospect, Kripke preferred this scene over Jason because it is more illuminating of Dean's character.

Dean's other dream is a major turning point in the character's storyline, after which he starts gaining self-respect and realizes that he truly wants to live. He begins the season with little self-worth, and the writers realized that this outlook stems from his father, John Winchester. Initially, they planned to have Jeffrey Dean Morgan reprise his role as John, who would browbeat Dean within the dreamscape. When they learned that Morgan was busy filming Watchmen, the writers instead found inspiration in the junkyard scene from the film Superman III, in which good and evil versions of Superman confront one another. Kripke noted, however, that the conversation between the two Deans still focuses on John.

=== Filming ===
Principal filming took place in Vancouver, British Columbia, with Bobby's hospital scenes being filmed at Eagle Ridge Hospital in Port Moody, British Columbia. To distinguish the dream sequences, director of photography Serge Ladouceur used full blue lighting in the backgrounds—he normally uses half. The seamless transitions between dream scenes were accomplished by compressing the background with a long lens.

== Reception ==
On its initial broadcast, the episode was watched by 2.68 million viewers. It received generally positive reviews from critics. Tina Charles of TV Guide was happy to see Jim Beaver become more involved in the storyline, and praised Ackles for his "amazing job" during the confrontation between the two Deans. She described the latter scenes as "seamless, yet painful to watch". Although Charles was happy to see the Colt get stolen—she thought the weapon was "too easy" and had lost its mystique—she noted her annoyance that the brothers continue to "look ridiculous" because Bela is able to steal things from them. Karla Peterson of The San Diego Union-Tribune gave the episode an A−. Despite the "sluggish pacing" of the first half, the "paternal baggage" and monster of the week "built up enough emotional resonance to triumph". She noted the actors' performances, such as the "great Winchester moment" in which Sam discusses Dean's demonic pact; for Peterson, "...the dark, wounded look in Jared Padalecki's eyes totally sells it". The "brutally good character writing" and "truly impressive work" done for Dean's dream-encounter with himself was also lauded, with Peterson writing, "Ackles gives two of his best performances in the history of the show. At the same time." Like Charles, however, she pointed out how "uncharacteristically stupid about Bela" the Winchesters have been. She commented, "Bela appears to have eaten the writers' brains for breakfast." The episode received a score of 7 out of 7 from TV Squad's Brett Love. Bobby's backstory at first was a "bit of a shock" for him, but he eventually came to realize that it "fits very well". Love also thought that the dream root aspect "worked out great", and deemed the dreamscapes "creepy and unsettling".
