= Dream a Little Dream =

Dream a Little Dream may refer to:

- Dream a Little Dream (film), a 1989 teen film
- Dream a Little Dream (Cass Elliot album), 1968
- Dream a Little Dream (Pink Martini and the von Trapps album), 2014
- Dream a Little Dream (Farscape episode), an episode of Farscape
- Dream a Little Dream (novel), a novel by Piers Anthony with Julie Brady
- "Dream a Little Dream" (The Grim Adventures of Billy & Mandy), a 2002 episode of The Grim Adventures of Billy & Mandy

== See also ==
- Dream a Little Dream of Me (disambiguation)
