= Bela Talbot =

Fictional character in Supernatural

Bela Talbot / Abbie
- Supernatural character
- Lauren Cohan as Bela Talbot
- First appearance: "Bad Day at Black Rock" (2007)
- Last appearance: "Time Is On My Side" (2008)
- Created by: Ben Edlund
- Portrayed by: Lauren Cohan; Tiera Skovbye (teenager)

In-universe information
- Alias: Abbie (real name)
- Gender: Female
- Occupation: Thief; Con artist
- Origin: England, United Kingdom

Bela Talbot is a fictional character on The CW Television Network's drama/horror television series Supernatural, portrayed by Lauren Cohan. Appearing only in the third season, she uses knowledge of the supernatural world to her personal gain rather than to help those in need. Self-centered and a thorn in the side of the series' protagonists, Bela makes her living by stealing occult objects and selling them to wealthy clients. Critical reaction to the character was mixed, with negative responses from fans ultimately leading to her departure at the end of the season.

== Plot ==
In her first appearance, "Bad Day at Black Rock", Bela Talbot hires two crooks to steal a cursed rabbit's foot from a storage container owned by the deceased John Winchester, a hunter of supernatural creatures. Anyone who touches the foot is granted good luck, but will die within a week if the foot is lost. She intends to sell it and shows no concern for the fate of the thieves. John's sons, series protagonists Sam and Dean, retrieve the foot but are cursed by it. Bela interferes when they attempt to destroy it, and shoots Sam in the shoulder. Dean, however, tricks her into touching it. She gives the foot up for destruction to save herself, but manages to steal $46,000 in winning lottery tickets from Dean that he had purchased using the foot's granted luck.

She next appears in "Red Sky at Morning", an episode in which the Winchesters track down a ghost ship responsible for local deaths. Bela fools them into helping her again, with the three of them working together to steal the precious and magical Hand of Glory. The Winchesters plan to destroy the artifact to end the curse, but Bela steals it from them to sell to a client. However, Bela then witnesses the ghost ship, which only appears to those who have spilled the blood of a family member. Condemned to death, she turns to the Winchesters for help. Dean is prepared to leave her behind to die, but Sam comes up with a plan to save Bela's life. This time, Bela gives them $10,000 as a "thank you" before she leaves because she does not like being indebted to others.

In "Fresh Blood", hunter and recently escaped felon Gordon Walker tracks Bela down and threatens to kill her unless she reveals the location of the Winchesters, as he plans to kill Sam. Bela agrees to find out their location in exchange for his priceless mojo bag, and has an unsuspecting Dean disclose their whereabouts to her. After Dean threatens to kill her, she uses a Ouija board to placate him by obtaining information on Gordon's location so the Winchesters can neutralize the other hunter first.

In "Dream a Little Dream of Me", Bela returns when the Winchesters contact her for help in saving fellow hunter and family friend Bobby Singer after he falls into a mystical coma. They need dream root to enter Bobby's dreams and find out what is keeping him asleep. She claims nothing from them in compensation, explaining she is helping them in order to repay a debt to Bobby. However, the Winchesters discover after Bobby awakens that she was lying, having helped them only in order to gain access to the Colt, a mystical gun capable of killing any being. Enraged at the theft, Dean and Sam attempt to track her down in "Jus in Bello", but instead are led into a trap she has set up; police arrest the Winchesters and place them in jail. Though the demonic overlord Lilith sends her forces, Sam and Dean eventually make their escape.

In "Time Is On My Side", Dean discovers Bela no longer has the Colt. He later gets her criminal record from England and learns her true name is Abbie. Almost ten years prior, when she was 14, she had her parents killed in exchange for her soul as part of a ten-year deal made with a Crossroads Demon; though Dean believes that she killed them to inherit their fortune and Bela supports this story, the audience is shown a flashback that suggests that she had actually agreed to the deal to escape abuse from her father. Now desperate because her time is running out, Bela tries to kill the Winchesters, but they anticipate her and escape ahead of time. Dean then calls her a few minutes before her deal is up and she confesses to him she tried to get out of the deal with the Crossroads Demon by trading the Colt. But once she gave it up, the deal changed so that she had to kill Sam as well. Though Dean refuses her pleas for help, she reveals to him that the demon Lilith holds all the contracts brokered by Crossroads Demons, including his own, hoping that Dean can kill Lilith. Bela's death and her soul's resulting descent into Hell is inevitable, but not shown with the hellhounds heard barking outside of the room she is in.

In season 5's "The Real Ghostbusters," Becky Rosen reveals to Sam that in Chuck's book version of "Time Is On My Side", Bela had lied about giving the Colt to Lilith. Instead she had given it to Crowley, Lilith's right-hand man and possibly her lover. Learning who Bela had really given the gun to gives the Winchesters their first real lead on where to find the Colt.

== Characterization ==
Described by her actress, Lauren Cohan, as "a female Humphrey Bogart", Bela is "a little bit manipulative" and she "always wants to be in control". According to series creator Eric Kripke, the writers conceptualized the character as "someone [the Winchesters have] really never come across before" because, though she moves throughout the supernatural world, Bela has no interest in the "altruistic or obsessed or revenge-minded motives of hunting". Writer and producer Sera Gamble summarized the writing team's characterization of Bela as a greedy "mercenary that [sic] just [doesn't] give a shit about the cause". Gamble believed that Bela "finds it quite amusing" that the Winchesters use their knowledge of the supernatural to help people. On this aspect, Gamble added, "I always suspect when someone is that blasé that there's something underneath, and we're finally getting into that".

Cohan viewed Bela as "a young woman trying to make a living and find some kind of reason in her world" who was "a little damaged." The actress shared Gamble's opinion of Bela's behavior being a façade, and incorporated into her performance the idea of Bela hiding her true self, with Cohan feeling that her character created a persona to shield her from "real strong connections". This defensiveness prevented her from opening up to the Winchesters, with whom Cohan believed Bela "would have loved to be able to have a normal relationship". Contrary to Kripke and Gamble's assessment of Bela as amoral and uncaring, Cohan envisioned the character as having "fits of conscience" offscreen throughout the third season. In the actress's opinion, Bela "would have loved to go around fighting evil with those boys."

== Development ==
Supernatural producers originally intended for Bela to be a recurring character. Having already created a new female lead in the form of the demon Ruby, they chose to upgrade Bela to series regular after Dawn Ostroff—at the time, the CW President of Entertainment—requested a second female lead for the season, because they "[loved Bela]" and already planned for her to return in future episodes. To avoid the "mistake" they had made in the previous season in introducing Jo Harvelle as a love interest, the writers planned to introduce Bela as "a character in [her] own right" who would act as an antagonist "with [her] own interests and [her] own motives". They were, however, willing to add in a romantic involvement with Sam or Dean should they and the fans both want it. The writers also planned for Bela to be "very separate and very different" from Ruby, and for the characters to "[serve] very different storylines."

Cohan auditioned for Ruby, but ultimately received the part of Bela. Upon learning of Cohan's British accent, a "really psyched" Kripke reworked the character to be British. The actress herself later pictured Bela that way, feeling she "has some kind of cool shading and sneakiness, which fits the British accent". At the time of Cohan's casting, however, she had been given little exposure to the character script-wise, and was unaware she would play a "nasty person". It was not until The CW up-fronts that Kripke gave her a "good spiel" about Bela because she would be interviewed. The actress later turned down an offer from him to provide more of the character's backstory, and instead opted to learn it as the episodes were filmed. In order to prepare for her role, Cohan received training in weaponry to be "well equipped with swords and a lot of instruments—sharp instruments", and in kickboxing alongside Ruby's actress Katie Cassidy. Cohan and Cassidy also decided to catch up on Supernatural before filming for the third season began, by watching the first two seasons together.

Due to "protective and occasionally nervous" fans, Kripke meant for Bela to be introduced in "small doses". He wanted fans to know the show would always be just about Sam and Dean Winchester, and stated, "[Ruby and Bela are] there for important plot elements, but it's not the Ruby and Bela show, nor is it about the four of them cruising around in the Impala together. It's about the guys." However, he felt the writers pushed it too far in the episode "Red Sky at Morning", stating his opinion that it "was by far the least successful episode this year because it really kind of became the Bela show". The writers also did not take the time to consider how to tie her into the Winchesters' storylines. As Kripke pointed out, "It's a road show and we're in a different town every week, so if you're going to run into the same character over and over again, you better have a damn good reason..." They were eventually "crushed under the weight of the absurdity of it" because it became more difficult to justify her reappearances within the narrative. Another key problem stemmed from their conceptualization of her as an antagonistic character rather than a potential love interest for the brothers. The writers, "so taken with a woman who could screw the boys over at every turn", ended up making Bela too antagonistic without establishing a balance. Any chance for a "funny effervescent episode where they all work together" was lost after the character attempts to have the Winchesters killed on multiple occasions. They eventually decided to drop the character from the series, opting to "send her off in an appropriate and dramatic way" which would "show a couple of cards [they have] been holding onto all season" by revealing her backstory "in a way that will surprise the audience and kind of tie her into the story."

== Reception ==
Critical response to the character has been mixed. BuddyTV staff columnist Don Williams deemed the addition of Bela a "cheap ploy" to attract teen male viewers, believing the character distracts viewers from the "brotherly bond that made the show so special in the first place". As well, he felt her "sexy cat burglar act, coupled with her flirtation with one of our heroes, is clichéd and has been seen a thousand times before", and he likened her to a combination of Catwoman and "the equally annoying Electro-Gwen from Angel". However, he later admitted Bela was "a great comic foil". Diana Steenbergen of IGN became "increasingly frustrated" with the "unlikable and manipulative" Bela throughout her appearances. She found the character's tragic backstory to be "too little, too late", but was surprised the writers were able to make her feel "even a tiny bit sorry for [Bela]" during her death scene. Writing that "Bela had a hint of vulnerability that would have been intriguing had we glimpsed it more than 30 seconds before she died", Steenbergen wished the character had been written differently—"not either annoying or downright contemptible"—and deemed her "a wasted opportunity to give us an interesting female foil for the boys". Karla Peterson of The San Diego Union-Tribune expressed similar sentiments, voicing her belief in her review of the third season finale "No Rest For The Wicked" that Bela "got gone just as [she was] getting interesting". In the same review, Peterson deemed the character to be a "decent traveling [companion]". Although TV Guide's Tina Charles was annoyed that Bela continuously steals from the Winchesters and makes them "look ridiculous", she "really liked" the character. Overall, she felt Cohan "did one hell of a job".

From the start, fans were very wary of bringing in female characters to the male-dominated show; they feared Bela was brought on to be "arm candy or [a sidekick]". To make matters worse, when coming up with the scenes for the auditions for Bela, executive producer Robert Singer spent an hour writing a lackluster script not intended to be used in the show. Mere hours after the script was given to the casting director, the show's fans had found them on casting websites and were "obsessively going over these scenes". According to Kripke, the fan reaction was the characters "really look like they suck". Bela's overly-antagonistic actions throughout the season did not calm the viewers' fears. "[Bela screwed] over the boys so badly," Kripke explained, "that she became unlikeable to the fans because she was irredeemable". Kripke has confessed part of the decision to kill the character off was due to the negative reaction from the fans.
