= Lilith (painting) =

Painting by John Collier

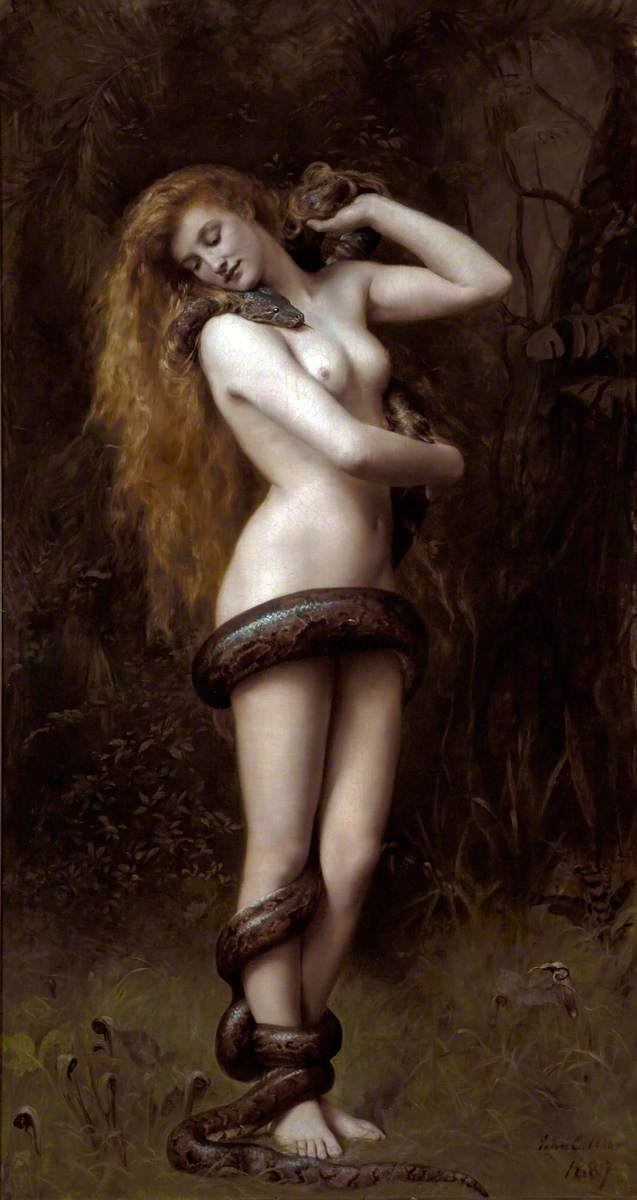
- Artist: John Collier
- Year: 1887
- Medium: Oil on canvas
- Dimensions: 194 cm × 104 cm (76 in × 41 in)
- Location: Atkinson Art Gallery, Southport

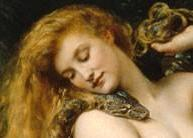
Lilith, detail

Lilith is an 1887 painting by English artist John Collier, who worked in the style of the Pre-Raphaelite Brotherhood. The painting of the Mesopotamian mythic figure Lilith is held in the Atkinson Art Gallery in Southport, England. It was transferred from Bootle Art Gallery in the 1970s.

== Description ==
Collier portrayed Lilith as a golden-haired, porcelain-skinned nude woman who fondles on her shoulder the head of a serpent, coiled around her body in a passionate embrace. Against the background of a dark, brown-green jungle, stands a naked female figure, whose pale skin and long blond hair falling down her back form a stark contrast with the forest. The head position and gaze of Lilith are turned away from the viewer, concentrating on the snake's head resting on her shoulder. The snake encircles her body in several coils, starting around its closely spaced ankles, past the knee, to her lower abdomen, where it thereby conceals. Lilith supports the snake's body with her hands in the area of her upper body, so that the snake's head can lie over her right shoulder up to her throat. Lilith's head is bent towards the snake, her cheek nestles against the animal. The brown tones of the snake's body stand out in contrast with the pale woman's body, but take up the color scheme of the surrounding jungle. Collier presented his painting inspired by fellow painter and poet Dante Gabriel Rossetti's 1868 poem Lilith, or Body's Beauty, which describes Lilith as the witch who loved Adam before Eve. Her magnificent tresses gave the world "its first gold," but her beauty was a weapon and her charms deadly. She is also mentioned by C.S. Lewis in his The Lion, the Witch, and the Wardrobe, where the fictional Mr. Beaver states that the Jinn Lilith was the first wife of Adam, and her lineage was passed down to the White Witch Jadis of Charn.

The magazine The British Architect described the work in 1887: "Here is a nude woman, whose voluptuous, round form is most gracefully represented, surrounded by a great serpent, the thickest part of which crosses it horizontally and cuts it in half; her head slides down her chest and she seems to be pulling it in tighter coils. The background is a coarse kind of green, repulsive and abominable."

== Reception ==
When Collier presented his monumental painting to the public, he received mostly acclaim, beginning with the London Exhibition of the Royal Academy of Arts, in 1887.

On the occasion of the 11th Summer show of London's Grosvenor Gallery in 1887, The Photographic News magazine found the Lilith nude study to be of considerable value. The exhibition catalog itself notes that the painting is worth looking at closely in terms of craftsmanship and sensitivity, and that the painterly execution of the snake is also noteworthy. The British Architect magazine noted that few painters could paint like Collier, and only an handful of them probably would be able to paint the snake like him.

The journal The Athenaeum ruled that Collier provoked a risky comparison by taking inspiration from Dante Gabriel Rossetti's poem Lilith in his painting. His Lilith features a sturdy model of about 25 years of age, standing erect, naked, arms crossed in front of her body, tilting her head slightly to one side so that her light blonde hair could fall down her back like a cloak. She is ensnared by a monstrous snake, which coils around her and pushes its head over her shoulder. The female figure is magnificently painted, thoroughly thought out, carefully worked, but is more reminiscent of Salammbô. Highly commendable as an informed study, it was by no means too similar to Rossetti's.

The Spectator attested to the picture's detailed, skilfully crafted and realistic depiction, which, however, meant that "somehow all poetry and every feeling had slipped away in the execution" and emphasized that in general every nude painting "which only realizes the superficial of the body strives, and in a realistic way, must be bad art” if it is painted uninspired of feelings and thoughts.

The painting was part of the exhibition Wild. Fashion Untamed at the Metropolitan Museum of Art in New York, in 2004.
