= Lauren Cohan =

British-American actress (born 1982)

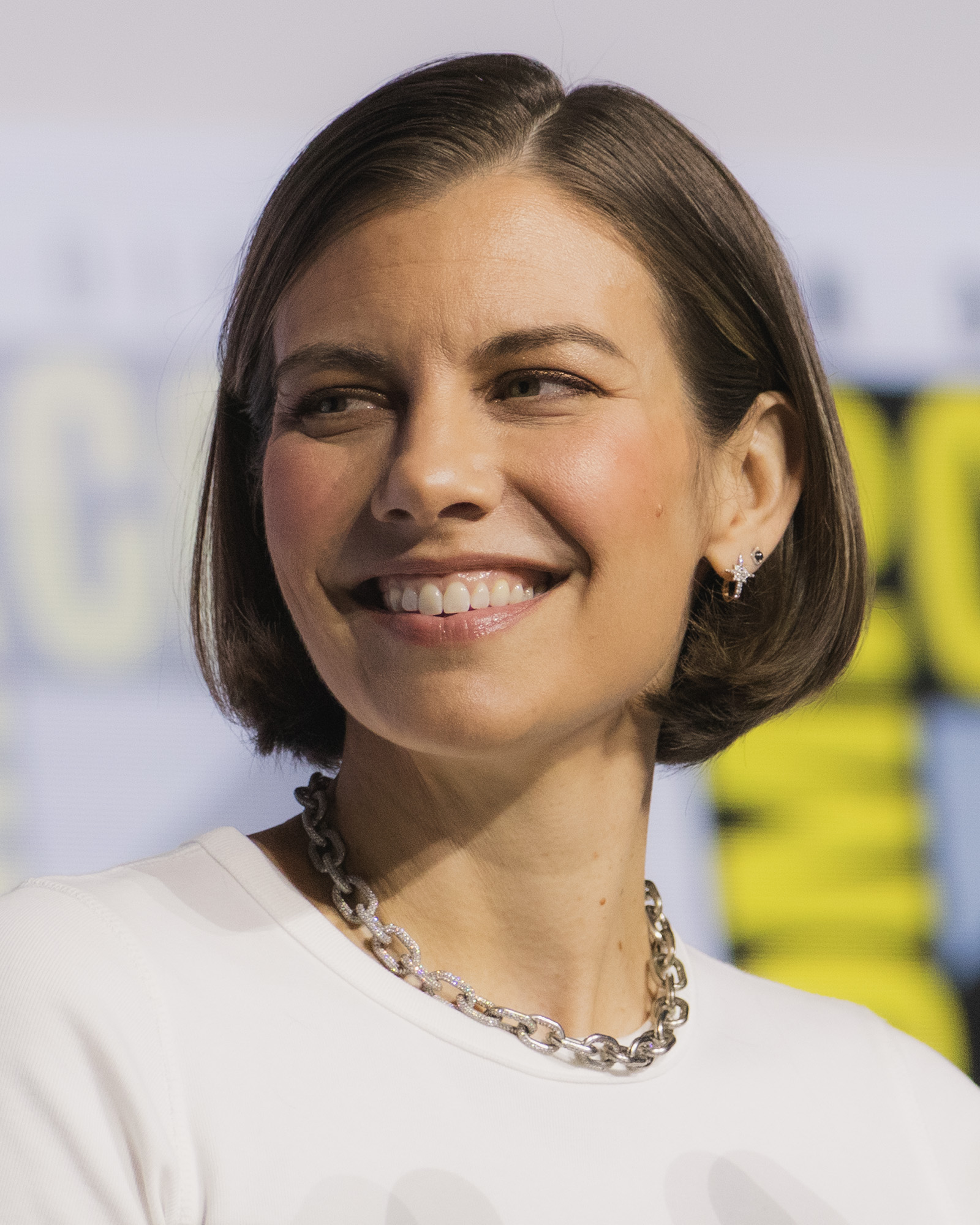
- Cohan in 2026
- Born: Lauren Storholm; January 7, 1982 (age 44); Cherry Hill, New Jersey, U.S.
- Citizenship: United Kingdom; United States
- Education: King Alfred's College (BA)
- Occupation: Actress
- Years active: 1996–present

Signature
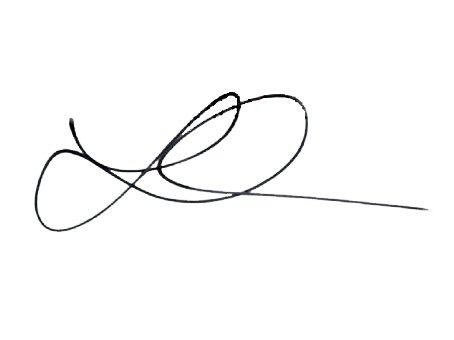

Lauren Cohan (/ˈkoʊhænˈ/ KOH-han; born January 7, 1982) is an American–British actress known for her role as Maggie Rhee in the AMC post-apocalyptic horror television series The Walking Dead (2011–2018; 2020–2022), a role she reprises in The Walking Dead: Dead City (2023–present). Her other notable TV roles include Bela Talbot in the dark fantasy drama Supernatural (2007–2008), Rose in the supernatural teen drama The Vampire Diaries (2010–2012), Vivian McArthur Volkoff in the action comedy Chuck (2011), Francesca "Frankie" Trowbridge in the action comedy-drama Whiskey Cavalier (2019), and War Woman in the adult animated superhero show Invincible (2021–2023). Her film appearances include the comedy Van Wilder: The Rise of Taj (2006), the psychological thriller horror The Boy (2016), the biographical drama All Eyez on Me (2017), and the action thriller Mile 22 (2018).

== Early life ==
Cohan was born Lauren Storholm in Cherry Hill, New Jersey, to an American father while her mother is Scottish. She was raised in New Jersey and spent a year in Georgia. When she was thirteen, her family moved to her mother's native United Kingdom, settling in Surrey, England.

Upon her mother's remarriage, Lauren's surname was legally changed to that of her stepfather, Cohan. She converted to Judaism at the age of five.

She has younger half-siblings through her mother and father's remarriages. Cohan graduated from King Alfred's College, Winchester (now the University of Winchester) with a Bachelor of Arts in Drama and English literature.

== Career ==
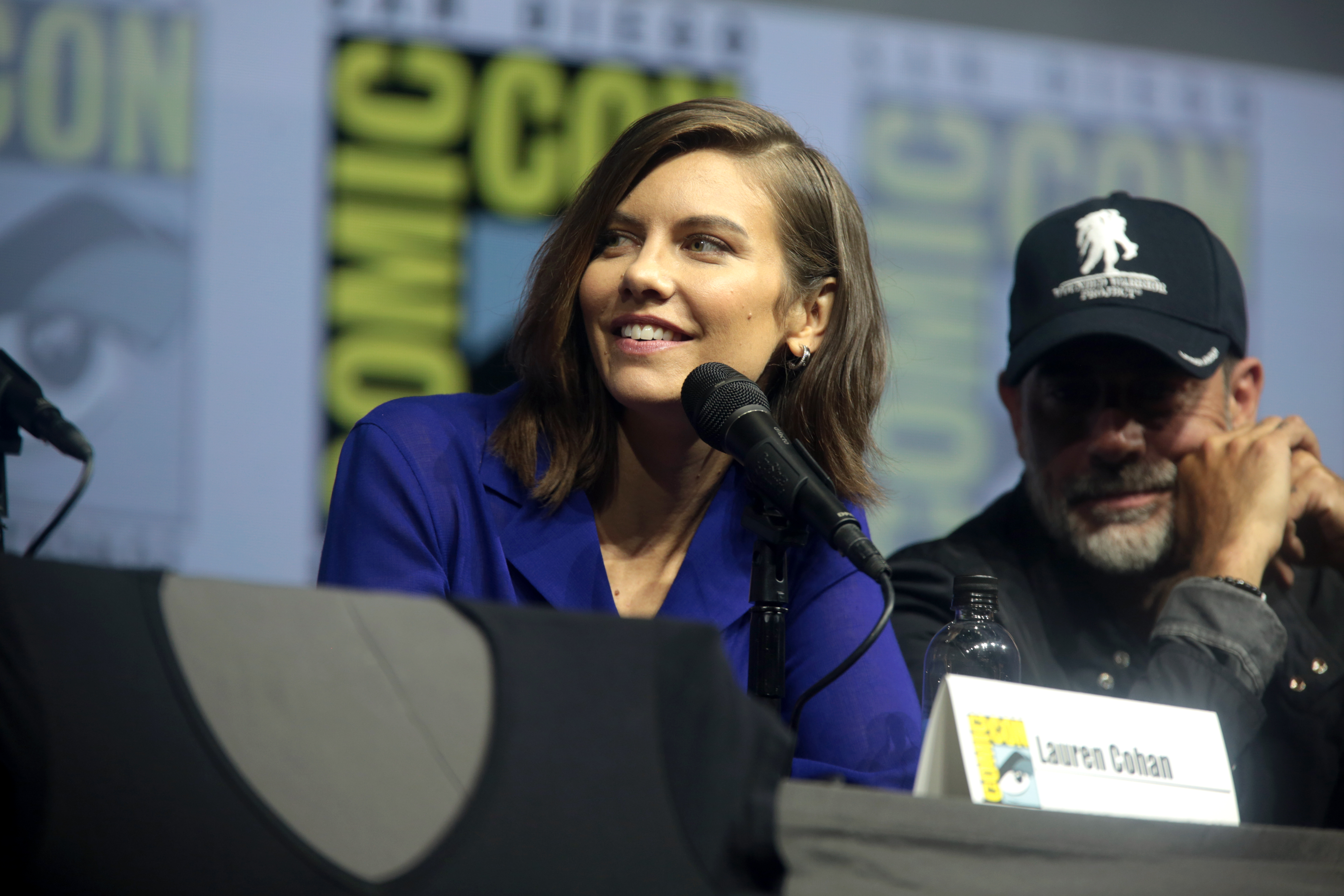
Lauren Cohan and Jeffrey Dean Morgan in 2018

=== Film ===
In 2006 and 2007, after her film debut in Casanova (2005) as Sister Beatrice, Cohan starred in the sequel to Van Wilder (2002), Van Wilder: The Rise of Taj, as Charlotte Higginson. Her next role was in the 2008 film Float. In February 2010, she was cast in Death Race 2 and was the lead in the 2016 supernatural-horror The Boy. Also in 2016, she appeared as Martha Wayne, Batman's deceased mother, in Batman v Superman: Dawn of Justice and played Leila Steinberg in the 2017 biographical drama All Eyez on Me. In 2025 she appeared in the independent end of the world movie When I'm Ready, her first on-camera film appearance since 2018's Mile 22.

=== Television ===
In 2007, Cohan garnered her first major supporting role, which was also described as a season lead, when she was cast for season three of Supernatural as Bela Talbot, a thief who procures valuable supernatural objects and sells them to rich and powerful people in the supernatural world. The character appeared in six episodes of the series. Her final appearance was in the penultimate episode of season three, titled "Time Is on My Side".

Cohan played the recurring character Rose, a 560-year-old vampire, in The Vampire Diaries. In 2011, she joined the television series Chuck in a recurring role playing Vivian McArthur Volkoff, a "charming, sophisticated socialite" from the United Kingdom, and the daughter of the primary villain, Alexei Volkoff. She also guest starred on shows such as Archer, Cold Case, CSI: NY, Life, and Modern Family.

Cohan starred in a pilot for The CW called Heavenly (2011) in which she played the lead character, Lily, an attorney who teams up with an angel; however, it was not picked up as a series.

In April 2011, Cohan was cast in her most notable role as Maggie Greene (later Maggie Rhee) on The Walking Dead, an AMC post-apocalyptic horror television series based on the comic book series of the same name. She first appeared in season two as a recurring character, but she became a series regular at the start of season three. The drama was the highest-rated series in cable television history in 2015. At the conclusion of the eighth season of The Walking Dead, Cohan completed her contract obligations as a series regular. It was later reported Cohan had not reached an agreement to sign on for season nine as a main cast member due to a pay dispute, as she demanded an increased salary closer to the salaries of her male co-stars Andrew Lincoln and Norman Reedus. AMC refused and Cohan began making herself available for TV pilots. Cohan eventually reached an agreement to appear in five episodes in the first half of season nine of The Walking Dead and departed the series in 2018.

In early 2018, in the midst of her contract negotiations with AMC regarding The Walking Dead, Cohan was cast as CIA operative Francesca "Frankie" Trowbridge in the ABC action comedy-drama Whiskey Cavalier. Whiskey Cavalier was picked up to series in May 2018 and premiered on February 24, 2019. ABC did not renew the series for a second season. In October 2019, it was reported that Cohan would return to The Walking Dead as a series regular in the series' eleventh and final season. Following the conclusion of the series, Cohan starred alongside Jeffrey Dean Morgan in the spinoff series The Walking Dead: Dead City, with both also serving as executive producers. In July 2023, the series was renewed for a second season.

== Personal life ==
Cohan lives and works in both London and Los Angeles.

== Filmography ==
=== Film ===
Key
†	Denotes films that have not yet been released

Year	Title	Role	Notes
2003	The Quiet Assassin	Alessia	Short film
2005	Casanova	Sister Beatrice	
2006	Van Wilder: The Rise of Taj	Charlotte Higginson	
2008	Float	Emily Fulton	
2010	Young Alexander the Great	Leto	
2010	Practical	Lauren	Short film
2010	Death Race 2	September Jones	Direct-to-video
2014	Reach Me	Kate	
2016	The Boy	Greta Evans	
2016	Batman v Superman: Dawn of Justice	Martha Wayne	
2017	All Eyez on Me	Leila Steinberg	
2018	Mile 22	CIA Officer Alice Kerr	
2022	Catwoman: Hunted	Julia Pennyworth (voice)	Direct-to-video
2025	When I'm Ready	Julia	
TBA	Both Sides Now †	Erin	Filming

=== Television ===
Year	Title	Role	Notes
2007	The Bold and the Beautiful	Forrester Creations Employee	Episode: "Episode #1.4986"
2007–2008	Supernatural	Bela Talbot	Main role (Season 3); 6 episodes
2008	Valentine	Joanna Clay	Episode: "Pilot"
2009	Life	Jackie Rolder	Episode: "Initiative 38"
2010	Modern Family	Receptionist	Episode: "Unplugged"
2010	Cold Case	Rachel Malone '86	Episode: "One Fall"
2010	CSI: NY	Meredith Muir	Episode: "Flag on the Play"
2010–2012	The Vampire Diaries	Rose	Recurring (Seasons 2–3); 6 episodes
2011	Heavenly	Lily	Pilot
2011	Chuck	Vivian McArthur Volkoff	Recurring (Season 4); 5 episodes
2011–2018; 2020–2022	The Walking Dead	Maggie Greene Rhee	Recurring role (season 2); 12 episodes Main role (seasons 3–11); 132 episodes
2012	Childrens Hospital	Lulu Pratt	Episode: "British Hospital"
2013	Law & Order: Special Victims Unit	Avery Jordan	Episode: "Legitimate Rape"
2013; 2024	Whose Line Is It Anyway?	Herself	2 episodes
2014	Archer	Juliana Calderon (voice)	Recurring (Season 5); 4 episodes
2014	Tim & Eric's Bedtime Stories	Stephanie	Episode: "The Bathroom Boys"
2016	Lip Sync Battle	Herself	Episode: "Sonequa Martin-Green vs. Lauren Cohan"
2016	The Mindy Project	Ashley	Guest (Season 4); 2 episodes
2017	Robot Chicken	Maggie Greene (voice)	Episode: "The Robot Chicken Walking Dead Special: Look Who's Walking"
2019	Whiskey Cavalier	Francesca "Frankie" Trowbridge	Main role; 13 episodes
2021; 2023	Invincible	Holly / War Woman (voice)	2 episodes
2021	The Walking Dead: Origins	Herself	Episode: "Maggie's Story"
2023–present	The Walking Dead: Dead City	Maggie Rhee	Main role; 22 episodes Executive producer Director – episode: "Bridge Partners Are Hard to Come by These Days"
2024	Twilight of the Gods	Inge	2 episodes

=== Video games ===
Year	Title	Role	Notes
2014	Destiny	Exo Stranger	Voice
2025	Dead by Daylight	Maggie Rhee	Playable character; voice and likeness

== Awards and nominations ==
Year	Association	Category	Nominated work	Result	Ref.
2012	Satellite Awards	Best Television Cast (shared with the cast)	The Walking Dead	Won	
2013	Eyegore Awards	Best Ensemble Cast Award (shared with the cast)	The Walking Dead	Won	
2017	People's Choice Awards	Favorite Sci-Fi/Fantasy TV Actress	The Walking Dead	Nominated	
2022	Saturn Awards	Best Supporting Actress in a Network or Cable Television Series	The Walking Dead	Won	
2024	Saturn Awards	Best Actress in a Television Series	The Walking Dead: Dead City	Nominated	
