= Being Human (North American TV series) season 4 =

Being Human
- Season 4
- No. of episodes: 13

Release
- Original network: Syfy / Space Channel
- Original release: January 13 – April 7, 2014

Season chronology
- ← Previous; Season 3

Being Human is a supernatural drama television series developed for North American television by Jeremy Carver and Anna Fricke, based upon the British series of the same name created by Toby Whithouse. The series premiered on Syfy and Space Channel on January 17, 2011, with a thirteen episode first season and tells the story of Aidan (Sam Witwer) and Josh (Sam Huntington), a vampire and a werewolf respectively, who move into a new apartment only to discover that it is haunted by the ghost of a previous tenant, Sally (Meaghan Rath). Together, the three of them discover that being human is not as easy as it seems.

The fourth and final season began on January 13, 2014, and once again introduced changes to the dynamics of the group: Josh's lycanthropy curses him to be a wolf all but the night of the full moon, but Sally, who has returned from being trapped between dimensions by Donna, now has magical powers and manages to free Josh from the curse, but the spell does not go as planned and Josh's inner wolf is still present, while Aidan must now deal with his wife Suzanna, who was thought to be long dead, and Kenny, who is now heading the Boston vampires.

== Cast ==
=== Main cast ===
- Sam Witwer as Aidan Waite
- Meaghan Rath as Sally Malik
- Sam Huntington as Josh Levison
- Kristen Hager as Nora Sargeant

=== Recurring cast ===
- Connor Price as Kenny
- Deanna Russo as Kat Neely
- Susanna Fournier as Zoe Gonzalez
- Amy Aquino as Donna Gilchrist
- Mark Pellegrino as James Bishop
- Kyle Schmid as Henry Durham
- Alison Louder as Emily Levison
- Erica Deutshman as Beth
- Imogen Haworth as Holly
- Jesse Rath as Robbie Malik
- Katharine Isabelle as Susanna Waite
- Janine Theriault as Blake
- Mylène Dinh-Robic as Caroline
- Tim Rozon as Andrew
- James A. Woods as Mark
- Stephanie Lemelin as Wendy

== Episodes ==
No. overall	No. in season	Title	Directed by	Written by	Original release date	Prod. code	US viewers (millions)
40	1	"Old Dogs, New Tricks"	Stefan Pleszczynski	Anna Fricke	January 13, 2014	137959-59	1.26
Three months have passed. Nora and Aidan are at a disused farmhouse, caring for Josh, who is a wolf all the time except during the full moon. When Josh returns to his human self and Nora is out as the wolf, he contemplates suicide due to the strain he is placing on his wife and best friend. With Josh's blessing, Aidan meets Kat at a faculty party. When Aidan goes to get drinks, a woman resembling Aidan's long dead wife Suzanna approaches Kat, but disappears before Aidan returns. The next day at the hospital, Aidan's suspicions are raised when Blake, who now works at the same funeral home that Bishop ran previously, tries to take a corpse. Elsewhere, Sally is with Donna in what appears to be a spa, but she soon wants to escape, though Donna warns that they are both a threat to reality. Sally escapes through Donna's death spot, experiencing Donna's death by hanging as a witch during the 17th century, and goes to meet her friends at the farm. Josh is not in his holding cell and, as the werewolf, he confronts the trio in a suicide attempt at Aidan's hand. Sally conjures up a ring of fire to trap him, allowing Nora to tranquilize him. However, Sally disappears into what she thinks is another dimension, and sees a little girl being stabbed by a group of witches. Blake reports to the new head of Boston, who is revealed to be Kenny, looking completely normal. Aidan is at the house when his wife Suzanna comes to the door.
41	2	"That Time of the Month"	Stefan Pleszczynski	Lisa Randolph	January 20, 2014	137959-60	1.03
Suzanna reveals that Bishop turned her into a vampire after the townsfolk drowned her, and warned her not to contact Aidan. Though they could be together again, Aidan feels he should remain with Kat, and Suzanna reluctantly agrees. She doesn't reveal the true reason she avoided him for two hundred years, that in her first feast as a vampire she killed their only son, and has been wracked with guilt ever since. Sally believes that she can use magic to change Josh back to normal. She goes to where the soup kitchen once stood, and enters the alternate dimension where she and Donna last fought, discovering a book of spells. That night, on the new moon, Sally conjures up a magical knife that must be stabbed into Josh's heart. Nora volunteers to perform the act, but cannot due to Josh's viciousness. Aidan reluctantly stabs the wolf, and it collapses. Both Aidan and Nora believe Josh is dead due to a botched spell. Sally disappears, and finds herself in the house again, watching the guys move in while she watches them from afar. She realizes that she has traveled into the past each time she has performed a spell. Back at the farm, Aidan is grieving Josh's death when a human hand thrusts out from the wolf's mouth. Aidan tears open the carcass to find the human Josh alive and well. When Sally returns from the past, she worries that the uncompleted spell will cause problems. Later that night, Josh cannot fall asleep, and when he looks in a mirror he sees wolf eyes staring back at him.
42	3	"Lil' Smokie"	Paolo Barzman	Nancy Won	January 27, 2014	137959-61	1.12
Sally, enthralled with the spell book, notices that the spells change from day to day, much to her frustration. While the boys are at the hospital, and Nora is out buying wallpaper, Sally finds a spell in the book that will bring back her door. She reads the incantation, but it summons Donna, come to take Sally back to purgatory. Sally burns the spell book and sends Donna back, but the spell book becomes a part of her, giving her knowledge of all its contents. At the hospital, Josh has trouble keeping his wolf at bay and is overwhelmed by his senses. He accidentally lashes out at his attending physician, and runs out. As Aidan prepares to start his shift, he is kidnapped by a group of vampires, and brought to Kenny. Kenny shows Aidan a luxurious new blood lounge, with donated blood and new women, but Aidan doesn't want to be involved. Later that night, two vampires attack Josh while he is out running. He partially transforms into a werewolf and kills them, to his shock. Aidan confronts Kenny, who reveals he childishly thought that if Josh were dead, he and Aidan could run Boston together. Apologizing, he reveals that he is still deformed but has the ability to compel not only humans but also other vampires to see him as normal. Their talk is interrupted by an emergency at the blood lounge. There are piles of ash everywhere; someone has killed all the vampires. The security footage reveals Suzanna as the attacker. Sally offers to heal Nora's burn scars using her new magic knowledge, but disappears after the spell is completed. She finds herself in the house during the 1970s, and spots the same little girl who was stabbed before. Hours later, when Sally returns to the present time, Nora's burns are healed, but as she's showing off the newly decorated room, the wallpaper peels away and reveals a message to Sally saying "Don't leave me", leading her to believe the little girl's spirit is trapped in the house. Josh returns to the hospital to apologize to the doctor he attacked, and quits his job.
43	4	"Panic Womb"	Paolo Barzman	Mike Ostrowski	February 3, 2014	137959-62	1.15
Kenny visits Aidan to talk about the woman who killed the vampires. Aidan doesn't reveal that it is Suzanna, but asks Kenny to talk to Josh and Nora. Nora is ready to accept Kenny's apology, but Josh is upset. While out jogging, Josh's wolf nearly causes him to attack another jogger, but his attention is drawn to a pregnant woman sitting on a park bench, whom he realizes is another werewolf. Caroline reveals that she, her husband Andrew, and their friends, were all attacked by a werewolf while camping three months ago. Since then, she has become pregnant, and is worried about the baby during the transformations. Josh asks her to come to the hospital later, so Nora can perform an ultrasound, which reveals that the baby is healthy, but clawed. Andrew is worried, and Josh's wolf arises, striking fear into Andrew, who leaves with Caroline. Aidan confronts Suzanna about the vampire slaying, and she says it is her job to kill any evil vampires. She asks Aidan to join her, but he is not willing to kill innocent vampires. Later that night, he tips Kenny off to her location, but at the last moment, warns her and tells her to leave Boston. Elsewhere, Sally approaches Zoe to ask for her help in finding the girl she has dubbed "Lil' Smokie". They track the family down to a house in another town in Massachusetts, and discover that the little girl, Beatrice Benson, is all grown up, and her daughter is the spitting image of her mother in her youth. Although all seems fine, Sally is suspicious, particularly when she sees the daughter staring at them from the window, but Zoe warns her to let it go. Beatrice is seen looking at a photo album with a photo of a second little girl resembling herself and her daughter staring from a second story window. That night, Caroline and Andrew pay an emergency visit to Josh and Nora, as Caroline's water has broken. As Andrew wonders exactly what Josh has become, Caroline goes into labor. Finally, she gives birth to a partially transformed werewolf who soon reverts into a healthy baby girl they name April. Elsewhere, Aidan speaks with Kat to reveal to her that he is a vampire, but she laughs in his face.
44	5	"Pack It Up, Pack It In"	Jeff Renfroe	Chris Dingess	February 10, 2014	137959-63	1.21
Aidan tries to convince Kat of the truth, but she believes he is delusional, until he reveals his vampire nature to her. Kat, shocked and hurt, asks him to leave. Beth and Holly are taunting the heartbroken Aidan when Sally banishes them from the house, and is sent back in time again. Josh and Nora visit Andrew, Caroline, and baby April, and meet another werewolf couple, Mark and Wendy. Josh thinks Mark is trying to exert dominance over him, but Nora disagrees. She decides to hold a baby shower that night. Kenny tries to help Aidan overcome being dumped with blood from the lounge. Josh's sister Emily arrives to spend the night while she waits for an apartment after leaving rehab for alcoholism. Josh and Nora promise her that they will take care of her, but Mark, Wendy, and a whole pack of werewolves arrive with beer. As the party rages on, Mark declares that they will form a pack together in case the peace with the vampires is broken, just as Kenny and Aidan come in drunk on blood. Emily manages to fight temptation and leave the party, and Sally wanting to console her, attempts to cast a spell to allow her to be seen, but it doesn't work. Sally goes back to the 1920s, and watches Aidan and Henry mercilessly kill a pair of flapper girls and an old woman. Kenny approaches Emily, but the spell Sally cast on her allows her to see Kenny's mutations, horrifying her. A fight breaks out between the wolves and Kenny and Aidan, Kenny runs from the house, and Mark leads the werewolves off. The next morning Sally confronts Aidan about what she saw, and he apologizes, saying that he has changed, but she wonders if he really deserves what has happened to him. Kenny comes back with the werewolf Astrid, and offers to remove Aidan's memory of Kat, but he declines. That night during a full moon, Josh and Nora decide to join the other werewolves for their change.
45	6	"Cheater of the Pack"	Jeff Renfroe	Craig Lamarsh	February 17, 2014	137959-64	1.16
The morning after the full moon, Josh is shocked to wake up next to Wendy. She tells a horrified Josh that their wolves must have mated the night before. Josh insists that he and Nora go home, though the group are planning a pancake breakfast, and suggests that he and Nora should move out on their own. Sally's brother Robbie comes to the house to say he is selling it, and that a few prospective buyers are coming. Sally casts a spell to make a vile stench, driving the prospective buyers out, but sending Sally back to the day she and Danny first moved into the house. She watches for weeks as Robbie and Danny confront one another and realizes that Robbie always knew Danny was dangerous, and tried to protect her from him. Back in the present, Robbie shows the house to a family with a young son, who goes upstairs to the bathroom, is lured into a closet, and scratched by the spirit of a young girl. The family leaves in fear. That night, Josh and Nora return after house hunting to find Robbie trying to fix the sink, believing it to be the source of the smell, just as the food disposal turns on and nearly harms him. Josh answers the door and is attacked by Mark who reveals to Nora that Josh and Wendy's wolves mated during the full moon. When she tries to pull him away, Mark knocks her down, driving Josh to partially transform and turn on Mark. Nora calms him down, allowing Mark and Wendy to leave, but now she doesn't trust him, and asks him to sleep on the sofa while she goes upstairs. That night, as Robbie works on the pipes, the water boiler springs a leak and forms a puddle at his feet. Meanwhile, an electric saw on a nearby workbench turns on and falls off the bench into the puddle, electrocuting him. Suzanna approaches Aidan to help him recover from the night before and his broken heart. She reveals that she works as a bartender, and that night at the bar their feelings for each other are rekindled and they consummate their love after more than 200 years apart. She offers to help him have greater self-control, but he turns her down, and after leaving the bar, he spots a young woman whose eye he catches. Sally finally returns to the present and wants to apologize to Robbie, who sees and speaks to her. Alarmed, Sally finds Robbie's corpse on the basement floor. Elsewhere, Aidan wakes up and calls Kenny's funeral home to have them take the young woman's body away.
46	7	"Gallows Humor"	Paolo Barzman	Lisa Randolph	February 24, 2014	137959-65	1.17
Sally tells Josh and Nora about Robbie's death, and Robbie is given a crash course in lycanthropy and vampirism. Sally believes she can bring him back to life, in a different way than Donna did, but will need Donna's help. Aidan goes to ask Suzanna for her help. She agrees, giving him some blood to bring him down, but it is poisoned. She chains him up and forces him to say the name of the woman he killed. He spends the next several hours recounting the names and circumstances of every person he ever drained. Sally returns to the big-box store that Donna's death spot has since become, forcing Donna to relive the events of her death as a way back onto the living plane as a ghost. Sally's actions send them back in time, and Donna warns that if she abuses magic like this the tether to the present era may snap, leaving her trapped in the past forever. The two watch as Donna is hung for being falsely accused as a witch, and then in her village's makeshift morgue as a real group of witches prepares to bring her back to life. They summon Donna's spirit and the spirit of another girl they sacrifice, using the girl to bring Donna back to life. These are the true consequences of bringing someone back to life. Sally is upset that she cannot simply find another ghost to sacrifice for Robbie's sake, and Donna offers herself, wishing to be finally free, however Robbie ultimately decides to stay dead, since he feels life no longer holds anything for him. Donna asks Sally to seal up her death spot so she can stay in purgatory. Sally agrees, and after doing the spell, travels back in time once more. That night, Josh tries to apologize to Nora, and the two of them begin to become intimate until Nora wants to stop. Josh is unusually insistent because the wolf is taking over. Not ready to handle him in his current state, Nora leaves him the next day. In the past, Sally sees herself taking her bathrobe off to reveal an all-too-familiar outfit. She has returned to the night of her death. She watches in horror as her past self drops her engagement ring down the bathroom sink, and Danny approaches.
47	8	"Rewind, Rewind..."	Stefan Pleszczynski	Casey Fisher	March 3, 2014	137959-66	1.02
As Danny accosts Sally for dropping her ring down the drain, Sally possesses her past self, saving herself from her own death and rewriting the future. With all knowledge of what happened to herself in the original timeline, Sally begins to use it to her, as well as Aidan, Josh, and Nora's advantage. Six months later, she plans on renting out the house, but she cannot stop Bridget from dating Danny, much to her regret. She watches the boys discuss moving into the house together, but is horrified when Aidan begins to talk up Rebecca. Sally intercepts them at the bar, turning Rebecca off of going back with Aidan, and reveals all she knows about himself and the vampires, proving that she is from the future. She offers them to rent the house from her, on the condition she is their third roommate, revealing all she knows about them and their vampirism and lycanthropy. She soon helps them decorate the house just the way she remembers, and even teaches Josh the rump roast trick he eventually learns from Ray. However, Ray discovers him in the forest, wondering exactly how he knows this fact. Josh and Aidan return to the house to find Sally talking to the police, as she called them to accuse Danny of murder when she discovers that Bridget is dead. Sally worries that she never does anything right, even though she means the best, but Aidan thanks her for helping him save Rebecca, and they kiss. Three months later, Sally tries to set Josh and Nora up during a dinner date, revealing to Aidan that the two get married in her timeline. They give the two of them time alone by going to a bar, but Marcus approaches them, trying to bring Aidan back into the fold, but Sally stops him by revealing that she knows about his work with the Amish. One month later, Josh is worried about how things are going with Nora, worried he may hurt her, when Sally tells him not to worry, and that he will marry her. As it is the night of the full moon, and when Nora takes him aside to speak with him, they begin to make love until Sally interrupts them, knowing that the full moon is almost risen. She whisks Josh away, keeping Nora at bay, but she is scratched by Josh, cursing her to become a werewolf now. The following month, Sally reveals to Josh that he and Nora got married because Josh turned her, and she tells him that things are fine. Josh apologizes to Sally for turning her, but Sally assuages his guilt. Three months later, Josh is upset about the turn of events, and Aidan reveals that Dr. Reid is going to propose to Nora. Josh is worried about Sally's prophecies, but Aidan has full trust in her, as nothing good has turned out for him. Later that night, Sally reveals to Aidan that they never got together in her timeline. On the next full moon, Josh is nowhere to be seen, and Sally gets ready to change. Before she leaves, they admit their love for each other. The next morning, they still do not know where Josh is, as Sally did not find him in the woods, but they find him with Ray in the house. When Ray leaves, Sally tells Josh that he tries to kill Nora, and that he is the werewolf who turned Josh, and by killing him Josh will be freed. Josh realizes things are not the way that they're supposed to be, and feels out of place in the house, and moves out, upsetting Sally. She is worried she has ruined everything by changing the past. Aidan tries to take her mind off of the way she wants things to be and not worry about Josh, but this just makes her realize they should not be together, as she has changed Aidan into someone who has given up on Josh. Upset, she breaks up with him. One month later, Aidan and Josh are not speaking to each other. Ray talks Josh into going to the blood den to attack vampires while they are strong due to the waxing moon. Aidan is at the blood den with Marcus, now back with the vampires. They meet Sally at the blood den, as she followed Aidan there, just as Aidan and Marcus step out, blood drunk. Sally tries to talk Josh out of attacking them, but Marcus and Josh fight, as Aidan takes on Ray. Sally tries to stop things, but Aidan strikes Ray with a pipe. Aidan and Josh begin arguing. As Sally tries to break up the fight, Ray beats Marcus with the pipe. Marcus ducks and Sally is bashed in the skull. Sally falls to the ground, and as other vampires step out of the blood den, Ray and Josh run away. Aidan watches in tears as Sally dies before him.
48	9	"Too Far, Fast Forward!"	Stefan Pleszczynski	Nancy Won	March 10, 2014	137959-68	1.10
In the aftermath of Sally's death at Ray's hands, Aidan gets Bishop to get revenge and he kills Ray, forever cursing Josh. Still feeling Josh is to blame, Aidan threatens him to never be in Boston, again, or else he will kill him. A year later, the flu virus is in full swing. Aidan is smuggling healthy blood out of the hospital as Nora turns a blind eye. Josh has opened a pie shop out of town, and despite Sally's urging that he settle with one of his regular customers, he denies it, as he does not want to make anyone else a werewolf. Aidan approaches Nora, who has begun stealing painkillers from the hospital pharmacy, for spying on him and Bishop, and reminds her of their agreement to not reveal anything to anyone else, while Aidan demands to know about the next shipment which has been mixed into the general supply by accident. The vampires begin rationing off blood, with Bishop having his own private stash. Josh calls Alana to speak to Sally in order to find Donna, but Alana reveals that Sally has possessed Josh to call her, driving a wedge between them. To cover for his lost supply, Aidan steals Bishops stock of blood to sell on the streets. Bishop attacks him later for violating their trust, but does not harm him any further. However, another vampire in Bishop's inner circle is not as lucky, and has his fangs pulled out for stealing from the supply. The following day, Josh is still upset with Sally over possessing him, but he now has some of her memories from the original timeline, one where he, Sally, and Nora are enjoying each other's company. A woman enters the bakery and after Josh disperses Sally with iron, he is attacked by a sickly vampire, which reminds Sally of the virus. She returns to Boston to speak to Aidan, and Josh comes as well, revealing that Josh's werewolf blood is the cure for the virus. The next day, Josh goes to the hospital to see Nora, who is divorcing from Dr. Reid after he cheated on her. Josh has another memory of Sally's in his head, the day of his and Nora's wedding. He leaves, but not before telling her to take care. Aidan replenishes Bishop's blood supply and drinks with him, knowingly giving him tainted blood that he is immune to. Aidan goes back to Sally and Josh to reveal he has poisoned Bishop, and Josh says that they are now even for saving each other's lives, but Aidan asks them to leave, upsetting Sally. Aidan speaks with Bishop who is heavily infected, and in Bishop's praising of Aidan for surpassing him, he mentions how he has gotten rid of his lover and his best friend. Later, he reminisces about his times with Josh and Sally and goes to the bakery to reconcile. However, Sally is suddenly transported to Donna's house where she demands to know what has been happening. Sally tries to reveal the truth to her, but Donna does not believe until she tries to use a butcher's knife to disperse Sally, only for her to be harmed. Sally manages to convince Donna to use her magic to set the timelines straight, but needs both Josh and Aidan's approval. Aidan is willing, but Sally believes Josh has some reservations, but Josh wants the life he has seen in Sally's memories and agrees. Before Donna performs the spell, she warns Sally that she will be flung into the future a bit before she is sent back to the right point in time. And Aidan asks Sally to make sure that his other self remembers the fond memories they shared in this timeline. As Donna chants the incantation, several instances of Sally's spirit fill the room. Sally is sent through time, but the timeline she sees first is one where Aidan, upset over Sally's disappearance, breaks Josh's neck, killing him. As Sally mourns Josh's death, she is flung through time again and watches Aidan oversee an ambulance take away a body. Sally demands to know what he did, when Josh steps next to her, as they both reveal they have called the police to take Robbie's body away in her absence. Aidan cannot remember the intimacy he and Sally shared, and Josh asks where she has been, and she tells them she has been to the past and the future, but the future seems to be much closer than she anticipated, not ready to reveal what she has seen to either of the boys.
49	10	"Oh Don't You Die For Me"	Paolo Barzman	Mike Ostrowski	March 17, 2014	137959-67	1.13
With Nora moving out, Josh reconciles with Andrew and Mark, revealing to them that he can transform into the wolf at will. Suzanna gives Aidan an ultimatum: he has to kill the head of the Boston vampires, unaware that she is asking him to kill his own son. Sally tries to get Josh and Nora to patch things up, by asking him to stay later, but during the argument when she spots Aidan coming out of the shower, she begins to remember the events of the alternate timeline. Josh visits Andrew and Caroline in their new house in the country, and Mark reveals that they are actually planning on having a party to form a new pack with Josh as the leader. Later, while Josh and Nora have some niceties before he leaves to go to the party, Suzanna gives Aidan the cross from their hometown's church that she has fashioned into a stake to kill Kenny. At the party, Mark tries to bring Josh's confidence up, until he brings a young woman who seems eager to meet him. When she hugs him, Josh notices that she is in fact a human. Mark reveals that most of the patrons at the party are humans who they wish to willingly turn into werewolves, which shocks him. Aidan approaches Kenny at the funeral home, ready to kill him for essentially filling Bishop's vacancy, until Astrid, the werewolf he met at the party, reveals Kenny has true affection for her. Aidan simply warns him to think about what he is doing, if it will be for her safety or his own ego. In the house, after Sally knocks aspirin out of Nora's hand, she reveals the events of the alternate timeline to her, admitting that she fell in love with Aidan during that time. Sally is still wary of revealing what happened to them to him, but Nora thinks otherwise, and Sally tells her all of the events of her other life. At the party, Josh confronts Caroline and Andrew about Mark's plans, as they knew all along. Josh is adamant that he will not turn them, knowing full well the truth of the condition, but when he leaves they stun him and cage him up in the basement so he can turn the people safely. Mark and Andrew reveal their plan to bolster the werewolves' numbers using him just in case the peace with the vampires ends, and they will follow him regardless. When he refuses to turn, they take a cattle prod to him to force him to change. As the other werewolves gather to see him, Astrid arrives, understanding the full gravity of the situation. Back at the house, Sally finally reveals that Josh owned a pie shop in the alternate timeline, and he was miserable. Nora is still wary about staying in the house because of all that has happened. Aidan goes to Suzanna to reveal that he is Kenny's sire and he asks her for time to rein him in rather than kill him. She gives him two months' time, otherwise she will take care of him herself, and Aidan as well. At the house, Aidan asks Sally's advice on what to do concerning Suzanna, and her advice is just to let her go, awkwardly, not telling him what she knows, but still trying to let him know Suzanna is not the right woman for him. Suddenly, Astrid rings their doorbell, revealing Josh is captured. At the funeral home, a new body comes in, but they are unaware that Suzanna is hiding within the bodybag. Aidan, Sally, and Nora go to save Josh, as the house is empty. Kenny goes back to the funeral home and is subdued by Suzanna using juniper, who has already staked all his workers. Aidan, Sally, and Nora find Josh locked up in the basement and they free him, but not before several of the werewolves come to stop them. Nora takes Josh to safety while Aidan fights the werewolves. Sally stays behind, despite Aidan's protests, and as he is overwhelmed and about to be staked by Mark, she possesses Andrew, giving Aidan a chance to fight back. With Sally's help, Aidan beats the werewolves, leaving everyone but "Shit Brickhouse" standing. Sally possesses him and makes out with Aidan as they did in her memories of the other timeline. As they leave, Aidan wants to know why Sally did what she did, but as he answers a text from Kenny, she dissipates before she can tell him anything. He arrives at the funeral home to see Suzanna standing over Kenny's body. Aidan realizes that everything Suzanna has been doing is because of her deep guilt over killing Isaac. She poisons him with juniper and tries to make him stake Kenny, but in his last bit of strength and clarity he stakes her. Back at the house, Nora reveals Josh is fine but Sally is unresponsive. Aidan wants to know why she has done what she did, and Nora reveals to him that Sally loves him. Sally soon comes to her senses, but she wakes up in the room in which she saw "Lil' Smokie" get sacrificed to the witches in her first trip back in time.
50	11	"Ramona the Pest"	Jeff Renfroe	Chris Dingess	March 24, 2014	137959-70	0.99
Sally wakes up in the bedroom in which she saw "Lil' Smokie" get sacrificed. As she wonders how she arrived, as she did not use magic, she soon realizes that she can hear Josh and Nora, who has stayed in the house waiting for Josh to convalesce, arguing nearby. She emerges from the closet, surprising all three of them. Downstairs, Aidan is asleep, when he feels Sally wake him. He is amazed that they can touch each other, and they begin to passionately kiss, until he is woken from his dream by Nora searching for a sledgehammer. Aidan breaks through the closet into the other room, and Sally tells them this is where she saw a girl get sacrificed. Aidan can smell that someone has died in the room, and spots a blood stain with fresh scratch marks in it. Before they can investigate further, Sally's father comes to the door to tell them that he has sold the house, and they have to move out by Monday. Aidan throws away several of his old belongings, and at Sally's urging, he reveals that he no longer has anything to tie him to his past, and dismisses attempting a relationship with Sally as both of them have bad histories with relationships, even though she reveals that they loved each other during her time traveling. He later goes to speak with Kenny, who has just ended an argument with Astrid about running away together, and he offers to help Kenny fake his death so he can run away, but he asks Aidan to ask Josh and Nora to talk Astrid into it. However, Josh is apprehensive about having Kenny and Astrid run away together, and they argue over what they really want out of everything, even though Sally tries to get them to stop, when all three are distracted by the ghost of a little girl. Sally realizes she is the girl she saw get sacrificed, and she introduces herself as Ramona, the twin sister to Beatrice. Ramona tells them that she has always been in the room, and has grown attached to them even though she could not speak with them. Sally convinces Aidan to talk to Beatrice, who works as a county clerk, but she and Aidan argue about their relationship and the future they may have, all while Aidan looks like he is talking to nobody. Back at the house, Ramona is worried about Josh and the others leaving, when she says Nora has arrived. Josh wants to turn with Nora that night, but Nora is still worried about him and his wolf and has only come so she can speak with Astrid. Josh goes back upstairs to pack, and Nora answers the door for Astrid, but Astrid pulls a gun on her, as the pack has decided to take Josh back by force. Josh tries to go downstairs to save her, but Ramona traps him in the room, as she knows it is not safe for anyone, until Josh changes. Mark and Andrew prepare to take Josh back by force, but the door swings open to reveal Josh has fully transformed. At the clerical office, Aidan's turn has come and he talks to Beatrice, but as soon as he reveals Ramona to her, she calls security to drag him out, horrified by the revelation. Aidan and Sally return home to see the bloodbath, Josh having killed all of the werewolves who came to take him back, including Astrid. Josh and Nora hurry out of the house to the woods, with Aidan promising to take care of things. Josh and Nora head to the campsite that they originally lived during the three-month period where Josh was trapped, because Sally has come up with an idea. While Nora locks herself up in the shed, she enters Josh's mind before he changes. She discovers Josh in his mind, as she knows the only way to solve things is to find the part of Josh that is missing, otherwise the wolf will take over, once more. Josh knows full well the other part of him that is missing, and it is his wolf, that he runs away from. At the house, Aidan has called on Kenny to have a clean up, lying to him that the pack killed Astrid on their own before coming to the house and Josh turning on them. In reality, he has hidden Astrid's corpse upstairs in Ramona's room. He tells Kenny that the only thing left for him is to leave Boston for good. In Josh's mind, Sally sees the futility of his plan of running away from the wolf and hiding during the change, but Sally makes him stand his ground, first by creating a happy place for himself to make the confrontation, the house. With Sally's encouragement, Josh confronts his wolf, telling him that he must live his life, and the wolf only gets the full moon to live. A peace is finally made between Josh and his wolf, who leaves on his own accord. The next morning, Nora finds Josh sitting by himself at the camper, and she realizes that he is finally back to being himself, as Sally watches them from afar. In the hidden room, Aidan puts Astrid's corpse into a body bag to dispose of her, and Ramona asks why he did not let the others take her, and he admits that she was special, but asks her to not bother him anymore, but she is gone. As he leaves the room, he does not notice that there are now fifteen scratch marks in the old bloodstain, when before there were only six. Josh, Nora, and Sally return to the house to find it spotless, and reveals the lie he told Kenny to them, so they can cover for each other. Josh thanks him for keeping him safe, and Sally informs him that he must always confront the wolf, or the wolf will win. In the funeral home, Kenny grieves, when he is visited by Astrid's ghost. She reveals to him that the pack turned on her and forced her to help them take Josh back, and Josh was the one who killed her.
51	12	"House Hunting"	Jeff Renfroe	Lisa Randolph	March 31, 2014	137959-71	1.05
Aidan visits Kenny to help him prepare for his leaving Boston, but Kenny is not ready now that Astrid is dead, and is suspicious now that he knows Aidan lied to him. However, he gives Aidan the keys to the van so they may all pack. Aidan returns to the house to find Josh, Nora, and Sally with Ramona. As they all plan on leaving, Sally pledges to stay behind, for a bit, to ensure Ramona passes on, but before she can reveal this to her, Ramona disappears. Nora asks Josh why he no longer writes in his "werewolf" journal, with Josh saying because the curse was lifted the first time, he no longer needs to keep track of his symptoms. Nora believes he should keep it, and they plan on moving into her old apartment together. Downstairs, after Sally laments the fact that Nora may have sold her favorite pair of tights, Aidan proposes that she "haunt" him in the RV in the woods. However, Ramona expresses jealousy that the four are leaving without her. The four argue over belongings, such as the microwave as the popcorn setting is apparently perfect for blood, but they are actually arguing over who gets to keep the "Dog Man Cat Dude" statue, with the group ultimately deciding that Josh and Nora get it, but Aidan and Sally get "visitation rights". However, their happiness is disrupted by Beatrice's arrival. Beatrice attempts to warn the group about Ramona's true nature. She reveals her parents joined a cult shortly before herself and her twin were born, and they were granted an audience with Paimon, one of the Kings of Hell. Her parents doted upon her, but kept her sister locked up in a hidden room, and never actually named her, and on one night after they had turned ten, Ramona was sacrificed to the devil. The group realizes something more is up when Ramona makes herself known, and Beatrice can still see her. Ramona, however, is furious at Beatrice as she believes her sister let her die, and she kills Beatrice in front of them. All four attempt to escape the house, but each is thrown into a separate room. Aidan finds himself in the basement with the ghost of Henry, who attempts to get Aidan to kill himself so he can become a ghost with Sally. Josh is in the kitchen with the ghost of Julia, who tries to get him to commit suicide so he can save Nora from an inevitable death. Nora is in the bedroom with Emily, who has fallen off the wagon and tries to get Nora to leave Josh as he is hiding something from her. And Sally discovers herself in the bathroom with Kat, who can apparently see Sally perfectly fine, and taunts her over her relationship with Aidan. Sally sees through the ruse first and realizes Ramona is making everyone see things. Sally confronts her, and she simply rebuffs Sally's idea that she is a ghost as well, and simply states that no one has a chance of leaving the house alive, and reveals that she is not trapped in the house but is the house itself. "Henry" continues to try to get Aidan to kill himself, as does "Julia", but Josh refuses and is rushed at by "Julia". Nora reads from the journal, which allegedly has a new entry, as "Emily" says that she must leave Josh for the well being of their unborn child, a fact that Nora has not revealed to anyone yet. As Ramona reveals how she has done everything to keep the group in the house, Sally realizes that she had a hand in killing Robbie, and realizes that she is trying to kill the others. Sally manages to get into the bedroom and manages to dispel Ramona's illusion, freeing Nora to go downstairs to help Josh while Sally goes to Aidan. Sally manages to stop Aidan from staking himself, and gets rid of the illusion of Henry. Upstairs, Josh is horrified by the sight of Nora's body on the ground, her throat slashed by the silver knife "Julia" attempted to get him to kill himself with. He prepares to kill himself until the real Nora arrives and gets Josh to see through the illusion. Everyone regroups and tries to leave through the backdoor, but are only trapped in the room with Ramona. Sally reveals to them that Ramona is the personification of the house's evil, and that she wants them trapped forever, if not dead. She taunts Ramona, saying that neither of them have killed each other, but Ramona simply says she has time, as she lets Kenny into the house, and Aidan out of the room, but keeping the others trapped. Kenny reveals to Aidan that he knows he is protecting Josh, but Aidan does his best to try to convince Kenny that seeking revenge solves nothing. The two fight, but just as Kenny is to stake Aidan through the heart, Aidan manages to turn it on Kenny. He does his best to try to get Kenny out of the situation alive, but Kenny compels him to believe that Josh has made Sally disappear and dies. Ramona lets everyone else out of the hidden room, and Sally realizes that when the other timeline's Donna sent her back to the normal timeline, she saw these exact events unfold: Aidan killing Josh in mourning over her. Sally tries to get through to Aidan before her vision of the future comes to pass and Ramona gets her way.
52	13	"There Goes the Neighborhood (Part 3)"	Stefan Pleszczynski	Anna Fricke	April 7, 2014	137959-72	1.41
As Sally watches the events of Josh's impending death unfold before her, she manages to freeze time, and gets herself, Josh, and Nora to safety in the basement with magic. She warns Josh that this will end with his death and it is because of Kenny unless she can do something, and she gets an idea. She opens the door to the basement but before Aidan can attack, she slams him into the wall with psychic powers. After she gets Nora and Josh to lift him into the bed, she performs one last spell. Aidan wakes up and can feel his heartbeat for the first time in centuries. Sally has sacrificed herself to bring him back to life, and she thanks all of them for all they have done before disappearing into nothingness. Ramona, however, is angry that Sally is gone, and attacks them, blowing out all the windows in the house, but the three manage to escape to Nora's apartment. Aidan is amazed that he is alive, but is sure that Sally is gone for good. After getting him his first real food in over 200 years, Aidan lets the two of them live together and he will stay in the RV as they had originally planned. However, after a night of drunkenness and sorrow, Aidan wakes up and realizes something is off. At the house, a construction worker enters and tries to get work done, but is distracted by Ramona. At the RV, Aidan looks in the mirror and sees that he has rapidly aged over night. The construction worker follows Ramona up to her hidden room, and she kills him with a shard of glass, planning on using him to get to the others. At the hospital, Nora presents Aidan with test results, showing that his organs are slowly failing as his age catches up with him. Both are hesitant to tell Josh of the truth, and when it does happen, Aidan accidentally reveals that Nora is pregnant with his child. Later, Aidan visits Sally's grave, leaving a rose behind, and goes to a bar in town, watching as he sees a new vampire try to get a date and meal. Aidan stops him, and demands that he turn him back into a vampire. At Nora's apartment, Josh tells her he plans on opening a diner to work in, but also is worried that he should get medication because of everything that has happened. Nora assures him she trusts in him, regardless of the wolf. Josh drives into town and finds Aidan getting attacked, but not fighting back, and the vampire leaves. Aidan finally admits that he is afraid of dying, because he feels that there is no good end for him with his centuries of monstrosities, but Josh just tells him that he is simply being human. The next morning, Josh drops off breakfast and the newspaper for Aidan, who is planning on seeing everything in Boston before he dies, but he instead happens upon the death of the construction worker in their old house. Aidan has an idea to end things for good, and demands that Josh not get involved, as he has a future with Nora and his child. Josh insists, and Aidan tells him to drop him off for now and meet him in the house in an hour. However, Aidan is planning on taking care of things by himself. He drops some bags off downstairs, and heads upstairs to try to find Ramona, finding his old leather jacket first, before finding her. She taunts him about how he will probably go to hell, and there is nothing that he can do to stop her because her creation was not one of Catholicism so any plans he may have to exorcise her are fruitless. Instead, he taunts her back that nothing she has planned for them will work, and she attacks him, planning on choking him with blood, before throwing him down the stairs, just as Sally died originally. He lands just as she did, but with his final breaths he ignites a cigarette lighter, throwing it onto a puddle of gasoline he had spilled earlier. As the house burns down, so does Ramona's evil spirit, destroying her, and the house, for good. Josh and Nora return to find the house burnt to cinders and Aidan's corpse taken away by paramedics. They enter to survey the damage, only to see Aidan's ghost greet them. They offer to let him haunt them, but he feels he should see the world first, until Josh and Nora tell him his Door has arrived. As he enters through it, he is greeted by Sally's soul, and the two embrace for the first time, as they both pass on to the other side. Josh, Nora, Sally, and Aidan appear to celebrate their lives together, in laughter and love, just as Josh wakes up with Nora at his side in a field. When he tells Nora of his dream, she says she saw the same thing, and Josh believes that somewhere in the afterlife Aidan and Sally are making these dreams for them, of a life spent together. Both worry what time it is, with Nora worrying about the pies they have baking, and Josh "worries" about their children. Nora picks up their baby daughter playing nearby, calling her Sally, while Josh calls out for Aidan, suddenly being caught in a game of tag with their young son.
