= Being Human (North American TV series) season 3 =

Being Human
- Season 3
- Blu-ray cover art
- No. of episodes: 13

Release
- Original network: Syfy / Space Channel
- Original release: January 14 – April 8, 2013

Season chronology
- ← Previous; Season 2 Next → Season 4

Being Human is a supernatural drama television series developed for North American television by Jeremy Carver and Anna Fricke, based upon the British series of the same name created by Toby Whithouse. The series premiered on Syfy and Space Channel on January 17, 2011, with a thirteen episode first season and tells the story of Aidan (Sam Witwer) and Josh (Sam Huntington), a vampire and a werewolf respectively, who move into a new apartment only to discover that it is haunted by the ghost of a previous tenant, Sally (Meaghan Rath). Together, the three of them discover that being human is not as easy as it seems.

Season 3 began on January 14, 2013, and features several changes to the core dynamics of the group: Josh is no longer cursed to be a werewolf, Sally is brought back from the dead at the expense of killing her loved ones and slowly rotting away, and Aidan is threatened by a deadly virus that kills vampires. Amy Aquino joins the cast as the witch Donna who is responsible for bringing back Sally, but at a steep price, as does Xander Berkeley as Liam McLean, the father of the purebred twins from season 2 who is looking for his daughter after learning his son has been killed by a vampire.

== Cast ==
=== Main cast ===
- Sam Witwer as Aidan Waite
- Meaghan Rath as Sally Malik
- Sam Huntington as Josh Levison
- Kristen Hager as Nora Sargeant

=== Recurring cast ===
- Bobby Campo as Max
- Connor Price as Kenny Fisher
- Pat Kiely as Nick Fenn
- Xander Berkeley as Liam McLean
- Deanna Russo as Kat
- Susanna Fournier as Zoe Gonzalez
- Lydia Doesburg as Erin Shephard
- Robert Naylor as Stevie Adkins
- Amy Aquino as Donna Gilchrist
- Mark Pellegrino as James Bishop
- Kyle Schmid as Henry Durham
- Alison Louder as Emily Levison
- Andreas Apergis as Ray
- Erica Deutshman as Beth
- Imogen Haworth as Holly
- Ellen David as Ilana Myers
- Angela Galuppo as Bridget
- Dawn Ford as Dutch Woman

== Episodes ==
No. overall	No. in season	Title	Directed by	Written by	Original release date	Prod. code	US viewers (millions)
27	1	"It's a Shame About Ray"	Stefan Pleszczynski	Jeremy Carver & Anna Fricke	January 14, 2013	213433	1.22
Fifteen months have passed. In flashbacks it is revealed that Josh killed Ray, and has been cured of the werewolf curse, but Nora has not been so lucky. The couple have been trying to recover Sally from Limbo, ultimately contacting a medium who at first refuses to help, but finally directs them to Donna, a witch who demands $2,000, Sally's body, and the heart of someone they have killed (they choose Ray). In Limbo, Sally, Nick and Stevie have been trying unsuccessfully to escape Limbo's version of the brownstone when finally Donna's spell releases them. Sally awakes in her human body, fearing that her friends may have woken in their coffins. Elsewhere, Aidan, underground in his coffin, is rescued by Atlee, who reveals that an influenza virus not deadly to humans has killed almost all vampires, including Mother. Atlee is bringing Aidan to the Dutch, who believe his pure blood will cure them. Aidan attempts to overpower Atlee, but Atlee is stronger and drains him of blood. On the way to the Dutch, Atlee, not cured, turns to dust. The car crashes, and Aidan is ejected. As he lies on the ground in pain, visions of Josh and Sally tell him maybe it is his time to die, but he resolves to fight through the pain and live. Elsewhere, Donna performs an incantation in the woods, leading her to where Josh and Nora buried Ray's corpse. She asks herself what she can do with him.
28	2	"(Dead) Girls Just Wanna Have Fun"	Adam Kane	Nancy Won	January 21, 2013	137959-47	1.17
Liam McLean finds his son Connor's corpse mounted in the Dutch stronghold, kills them all, and vows to find his son's murderer. He turns up at the storage unit where Nora is about to lock herself in for the full moon and questions her about Connor and Brynn, then locks himself in with her so they can turn together and he can better judge her truthfulness. At the brownstone, Josh and Sally see Nick and Stevie off on their new lives, and get a call from Aidan, who is surprised that Sally is corporeal and Josh is no longer a werewolf. Josh takes Sally for a night on the town, and reveals he intends to propose to Nora. An old high school friend, Trent, recognizes Sally, though Donna had warned her to see no one from her past. She tells him she faked her death to escape Danny, they hit it off, and later Sally takes him home, but he feels an apprehension he cannot explain, and leaves. Aidan needs blood, and his old source Tracy, who now carries the vampire-killing flu virus, sends him to the black market for pure blood, but the werewolves who have taken over Boston entrap him. Henry appears, saves him, and brings him home to feed on his girlfriend Emma who is infection-free. Aidan realizes that Emma is under compulsion, and refuses to feed. Later an angry Henry discovers that Aidan has let Emma escape, as Aidan promises they will find a new way to survive. At the brownstone the next morning Josh and Sally hear sirens outside, and see Trent's lifeless body being loaded into a body bag. The reason for Donna's warning is now apparent; if Sally sees someone from her past life, they die. Josh goes to the storage unit to find it empty, the door torn like paper, and a blood trail leading out of the unit.
29	3	"The Teens They Are a Changin'"	Adam Kane	Mike Ostrowski	January 28, 2013	137959-48	1.42
Nora survives her night with Liam, and tells Sally and Josh about Liam's quest to find information about his children. Aidan and Henry hunt for clean blood. Josh refuses to identify flu-free patients for them, but changes his mind. A patient file piques his interest. The patient, Erin, tells Josh she was scratched by a strange dog during the last full moon, and Josh realizes she was attacked by a werewolf and will turn on the next full moon only a day away. The social services worker arrives to take Erin to a foster home, but Josh and Nora claim she has been abused and must stay at the hospital. They decide to take her in and tell her the truth. She doesn't believe it at first, but Josh convinces her with a video of his transformation. Josh gives Aidan the address of a flu-free patient, and he and Henry track the man down. Struggling with an over-eager Henry, Aidan sees a tell tale sign that Henry has ingested virus-tainted blood. He invites Henry to drink his untainted blood, but Henry refuses, saying everyone who Aidan loves ends up dead, and goes off to die alone. Sally, upset over Trent's death, heads to the funeral home where Trent is being prepared for his funeral service, and tries to help his ghost get his Door. He thinks his fiancée Candice needs to be told about his infidelity, so Sally tells Candice, only for Candice to reveal she has been cheating on Trent for a year. Candice feels better, however Trent is still without his Door. Max, the undertaker, tells Sally he admires her for bringing comfort to Candice; Sally finds him charming. In the woods, Nora and Erin prepare to turn, with Josh for support. When she turns, Erin tries to attack Josh, who holds his ground until Nora transforms and puts Erin in her place. At the funeral home, Trent finally sees his Door appear. He passes through only to find himself in Donna's soup kitchen. Donna says she is happy to have her "first delivery", and that it took a while for Sally to give in to the urge to see someone from her past. Trent is incredulous that he will spend eternity in the kitchen, but Donna says he will in fact not spend eternity anywhere, and uses an iron meat cleaver to slice through his spirit, turning it to a pile of dust. Donna eats some of the dust, and suddenly appears more youthful.
30	4	"I'm So Lonesome I Could Die"	Jeff Renfroe	Keto Shimizu	February 4, 2013	137959-49	1.05
After Henry's death, Aidan copes by having an impromptu party, to Josh and Nora's ire. The following morning, Nora tells Josh she will be spending the evening at her parents'. When Aidan wakes up, Josh reprimands him for the party, and wants to talk about Henry, but Aidan says he is fine, and no longer needs Josh's help in finding clean blood. Josh wants Aidan to get his job back, since they are strapped for cash after raising Sally from the dead, sending money to Ray's wife and son, and getting a new car after Erin destroyed the old one, but Aidan isn't ready. Sally awakes from a nightmare where people from her past recognize her and die, and talking with Erin she expresses the desire for a new identity. That night, Aidan takes Sally out on the town to a tough bar where he knows no one will know her, also hoping to find a new victim. At the bar, Sally quizzes Aidan and discovers vampires who wish to acquire new identities often assume those of dead children. Aidan ditches Sally to attack a burly biker, leaving him for dead. At Nora's family home Josh meets her father Robert, younger brother R.J., and mother Lynette. Both Josh and Erin, brought along so they can keep an eye on her, notice something off about the family. Alone, Nora reveals to Josh that she killed Brynn after they fought. Josh forgives her, and later asks Robert's permission to marry Nora. Back at the house, Aidan dreams about everyone he has lost, and awakes to find Sally holding a stake to his heart. Holding back tears, she asks why he has a death wish when he finally has all he wanted, and he admits that he has been selfish. He regains his resolve, and signs up at the hospital for nursing duty. R.J. arrives at the brownstone, drunk, telling Nora about Josh's wish to marry her, but she doesn't believe it, and leaves to get coffee to sober him up. Josh returns to find R.J. making out with Erin, is enraged that R.J. is hitting on a 15-year-old, and a fist fight ensues, just as Nora returns. Later Josh discovers Erin has run away. At the funeral home, Sally searches death certificates to find a child's identity to steal when Max walks in. She says she needs a means to leave, and Max offers her a job as an undertaker, for cash. At the hospital, Aidan is hired on as a night shift worker assigned to Kenny, a teenager with severe combined immunodeficiency, who has never had a germ in his system, and lives in an isolation chamber.
31	5	"Get Outta My Dreams, Get Into My Mouth"	Jeff Renfroe	Chris Dingess	February 11, 2013	137959-50	1.11
Aidan has a nightmare where he nearly kills Kenny. On waking he sees Beth and Holly, the two young women he killed for Henry, come to haunt him. Nora's friend Kat is subletting Nora's apartment and arrives to drop off the rent. Sally begins her first day of work at the funeral home, and invites Max to join Zoe, Nick and herself for dinner. Sally hears another ghost talking and discovers it is Linda, Max's mother, who keeps watch over him. During dinner at the house, Linda makes comments throughout the evening. When Sally says goodnight to Max, she leans in for a kiss, but he is befuddled and leaves quickly. At the hospital, Aidan, with Beth and Holly taunting him, gives in to temptation and takes a blood sample from Kenny to drink. On the way home he is attacked by werewolves, but repels them, as Liam watches from the shadows. When Nurse Kerwin arrives to take more blood, Kenny begins to wonder about Aidan, and tries various tests on him, finally asking outright if Aidan is a vampire, but Aidan laughs it off. At the funeral home, Max apologizes to Sally about the night before, and they become intimate. Linda reappears, calling Sally a slut. Sally seems to dump Max and quit her job, but then wakes up to discover that it was Linda, who had taken over her body. Sally consults Zoe, who lends her a Soul Lock pendant that will bind Sally's spirit to her body, preventing Linda from taking over. Sally, protected by the Soul Lock, returns to the funeral home and prepares to exorcise Linda, who admits she only wants Max to be happy. Sally helps her see the futility of her methods, meets with Max again, apologizes for "her" actions earlier and asks if they can start over. They kiss while Linda looks on happily. Liam wants Josh and Nora to kill Aidan, but Josh commands Liam at gunpoint never to approach Aidan or Nora again. Later, Liam arrives at the house with Erin in tow, commends Josh's bravery and says he is now part of the family. At the hospital, Nurse Kerwin wakens Aidan, confronts him about the blood samples and threatens to report him. Aidan kills her, and while drinking her blood, wakes from the nightmare. However, Kenny sees Aidan's vampire eyes and teeth as Aidan runs out of the room with Beth and Holly still taunting.
32	6	"What's Blood Got to Do With It?"	Mairzee Almas	Kate Burns	February 18, 2013	137959-51	1.15
Sally and Max are enjoying breakfast together in the brownstone when Sally's estranged brother Robbie arrives. She hides, while the guys discover that Robbie is there on behalf of their new landlord, his father Samid, who inherited the house after Danny's death. Later Sally accidentally bumps into Robbie in the street. He recognizes her, and she tells him she loves him and flees, realizing he is now doomed to die. Aidan finally admits to Kenny that he is a vampire, and Kenny asks how it happened. Aidan flashes back to the American Revolution when as a soldier he found Bishop feeding on the dead. Aidan allows Bishop to turn him in return for the lives of his troop, but soon Aidan meets his wounded friend Ben, and, entranced by the blood, drains him dry. Aidan vows never again, but Bishop proves the lure is too strong by compelling a passing British soldier for Aidan to feast once more. Kenny asks Aidan to turn him, but when he refuses, Kenny vows to leave the hospital on his eighteenth birthday even if it means death. Josh discovers that Erin has been searching through his and Aidan's rooms. Sally confronts Donna at the soup kitchen and demands she save Robbie. At first Donna refuses but finally agrees to save Robbie and everyone else she might see in return for Sally's soul following her natural death in this new life. Sally agrees, and asks what will become of her soul, but Donna says it is no longer her right to ask. Sally finds Robbie living in his car. His father found out Robbie was trying to scam Josh and Aidan out of the rent money and kicked him out. Robbie criticizes her for not attending their mother's funeral, and letting their father think she is dead, but she explains that it was because of Danny. As he leaves for Florida, she gives him gas money, hugs him and watches him drive off. At the house, Erin texts Liam on a cellphone he gave her when he inducted her into his pack. He has tasked Erin to poison Aidan with her blood by sneaking it into his blood supply. Aidan realizes he has drunk werewolf blood, and falls to the floor in pain, bleeding from his eyes and nose while Erin hovers over him with a wooden stake.
33	7	"One Is Silver and the Other Pagan"	Mairzee Almas	Lisa Randolph	February 25, 2013	137959-52	0.98
Erin taunts Aidan as he writhes in pain, poisoned by werewolf blood. He kicks her and sends her flying into a wall. Erin is rushed to the hospital in critical condition, and Nora, furious with Aidan, stands vigil at Erin's bedside, believing she poisoned Aidan unintentionally. Sally's friend Bridget invites Sally to join her at a Wicca coven she's taken an interest in after her experiences with Sally in the afterlife. At the Wicca circle, they try to contact a members' dead husband, but instead, two ill-intentioned male ghosts arrive, and one possesses Bridget. Sally chases them off, and warns Bridget away from dabbling with the afterlife, saying they should part ways, but giving Bridget the Spirit Lock pendant to keep her safe. Aidan finds Kenny has a visitor, "Aunt Blake", who tells Aidan that Kenny has entered into a contract with her: he will feed her for the next year, and upon his eighteenth birthday she will make him a vampire. Blake knows Aidan has killed a purebred werewolf, and has ambitions to run Boston. Later Aidan finds Kenny is lethargic after Blake has taken too much blood. Kenny says that Blake scares him, and Aidan blows Blake's cover as Kenny's aunt with hospital security. When Blake returns, Aidan warns her off and says he will turn Kenny himself. Kat looks for Nora at the brownstone, needing help with a burst pipe at her apartment, and Aidan offers to help. Aidan fixes the plumbing, and when Kat reveals she is a history doctoral student studying the American Revolution, and Massachusetts' attempt to secede, Aidan impresses her with his (first hand) knowledge. They agree to go on a date. At the hospital, Josh accuses Liam of directing Erin to kill Aidan. Josh's sister Emily, knowing that Josh wants to propose to Nora, gives him their grandmother's engagement ring. Liam enters Erin's hospital room, commends her for the actions she has taken for the pack, smothers her with a pillow, and kills her. Blake walks alone at night and is stalked by Liam, who brags of his pure blood. Without naming anyone she taunts that there is a purebred wolf killer in Boston, and he lets her go. Back at the house, Sally brushes her hair, and finds clumps coming out with scalp still attached, leaving open sores, and calls out for Josh's help.
34	8	"Your Body Is a Condemned Wonderland"	Kelly Makin	Nancy Won	March 4, 2013	137959-53	0.97
Aidan stays away from the house to avoid Nora, who blames him for Erin's death. Liam gives Nora wolfsbane to help her grieve, and she lets it slip that Brynn is dead, but covers up quickly. Aidan apologizes to Nora, and tells her he knows that she killed Brynn, and the two call a truce. Aidan tries to break off his relationship with Kat to appease Nora, but Kat refuses. Sally's scalp is still rotting away. She asks Nick if he is experiencing anything similar, but he puts her off, before checking a decomposing sore on his stomach. Later he pounces on a stray cat he has been feeding, and devours it alive. His sore now gone, he sets out another dish of cat food to catch his next meal. Josh and Nora go to an open house, and after the real estate agent leaves them alone, Josh proposes, and Nora accepts. At the funeral home, Sally is impressed with the embalmer's wax that Max uses on a corpse he is preparing. She tries to take some, but Max catches her, and she reveals the truth about her previous death and decomposing sore. Appalled that she is technically a zombie, he flees. Later he comes around, accepts Sally for who she is, and helps her cover up her sores. At Kat's workplace, Liam and his men approach Aidan and Kat. Aidan promises he will call Kat later, and willingly goes with Liam. At his residence in Boston, Liam tortures Aidan, demanding information about Brynn, but Aidan is silent. Kat calls the brownstone looking for Aidan, and tells Josh how Liam came for him. Josh, with ammunition and a silver-bladed knife, drives to the mansion where Liam is preparing to inject Aidan with a vial of virus-tainted blood. As the full moon nears its zenith, Josh storms into the mansion, as Aidan insists that he killed Brynn. Josh fires at Liam, but not before Liam injects Aidan. Liam begins to turn into a wolf, and Josh manages to release Aidan just as Liam transforms. Josh stabs Liam with the silver knife, but is scratched by the werewolf before they make their escape. Back at the house, Josh reveals that Liam has scratched him. The virus attacks Aidan at an alarming rate. Later that night, Sally, ravenously hungry, eyes a pack of raw ground beef in the fridge, gives into her hunger and eats the raw meat, finally feeling some relief from the endless hunger she has had since her resurrection.
35	9	"Of Mice and Wolfmen"	Kelly Makin	Keto Shimizu	March 11, 2013	137959-54	1.12
Nora, waking from the previous night's transformation in the woods, crosses paths with a naked old man who nonchalantly introduces himself as Pete, a vegetarian werewolf. She walks him to his RV, expressing the hope that they will meet again. Sally is getting worse; when she brushes her teeth, the toothbrush pierces her cheek and a tooth falls out. In the kitchen, she watches as a mouse is caught in a trap, gives in to temptation, and eats it. Later she finds her cheek and scalp restored. Sally tells Nick she has eaten a mouse, and he confirms that eating freshly killed creatures is the only way to stave off decomposition. Zoe tells Sally that Nick has bitten her, and has been looking at her strangely since. At the hospital, Aidan tells Kenny he will not be able to turn him now that he is dying of the virus and Blake arrives to reclaim Kenny for herself. Josh tries to ease Aidan's final night. Aidan loses consciousness, flashing back to when Suzanna took care of him. Pete arrives, taking up Nora's invitation. He reveals he had the same problems that Josh had after his change, but improved after he accepted Gordon, his wolf, as part of himself through meditation. He leads the other two in a meditation, and helps Josh realize that his wolf is afraid of him. Aidan wakes from another dream of Suzanna to find Josh and Sally at his side. He suffers a seizure, bleeding from his eyes and mouth, and Josh and Sally believe it is the end. However next morning, they are all surprised to find that he is healthy. Aidan believes his cure is the result of drinking Josh's werewolf blood two years prior and Erin's blood during the assassination attempt. He later offers Blake the cure, stressing that only enough blood should be taken so both live, if she promises that Kenny, Josh and Nora are off limits to the vampires. Later that night, Blake lays a trap with dozens of other vampires who plan to drink from a werewolf to cure the virus. Aidan recalls Suzanna imploring him to pursue love, should he find it in the future. He goes to the university to see Kat, embracing and kissing her passionately. And Zoe comes home to see Nick eating a recently killed cat. With his face bloody and eyes glazed over, he lunges for her as she screams in terror.
36	10	"For Those About to Rot"	Paolo Barzman	Chris Dingess	March 18, 2013	137959-55	1.02
Josh tries unsuccessfully to commune with his wolf, and Pete promises Josh to help him that night at his RV. Aidan wakes up in a gutter, barefoot. Zoe tells Sally she killed Nick in self-defense. Nick's ghost returns and warns Zoe against Sally, as his Door, emblazoned with a gilded clamshell, appears. He passes through, and Zoe asks Sally to stay away. Aidan has a flashback to church, with Reverend Herring publicly implies that God doesn't wish Aidan and Suzanna to have a child because of darkness in their hearts. Back in the present day, Kat takes Aidan to Boston's rare book archive to show him the book "Days on the Charles", by Edmund Waite (his father) since he mentioned Corwich in his fever dreams. Aidan nearly lets it slip that the author is indeed his father, but their attention is soon drawn to Jeff Westin, Kat's ex-boyfriend and former college professor who has brought along his newest girlfriend, Marissa. Later at Kat's house, Aidan and Kat become intimate. Sally and Josh find Stevie at his parents' house. At first he claims he ran out of money and came home, and that his family is away, but when Josh finds a severed arm in the breadbox, Stevie admits his parents died as a result of seeing him, and he's been eating their dead corpses, but the arm in the breadbox is the mailman's. Stevie asks for help him kill himself, as he has tried and failed. Eventually Josh, knowing that he is too far-gone, tells Sally to leave and does the deed. Stevie's ghost arrives to thank them. His Door appears and Sally sees the same gilded clamshell and realizes something is wrong since ghosts' Doors are never the same, but Stevie passes through before she can stop him. Josh arrives at the RV to find Pete being attacked by vampires seeking the blood cure. Josh tries to save him and is almost killed, but Pete calls out Josh's name, and recognizing it they leave him alone. Aidan, in a flashback, sees Suzanna in labor, as he begs God to let their child live. Then the cries of a healthy baby are heard, the midwife says he has a son, and Aidan holds Isaac for the first time. He wakes up in an alley, his odd blackouts still not cured. Leaving, he unknowingly passes by the blood-drained body of Jeff Westin.
37	11	"If I Only Had Raw Brain"	Paolo Barzman	Mike Ostrowski	March 25, 2013	137959-56	1.16
Josh is furious with Aidan for revealing the cure to the other vampires. Kenny tells Aidan to turn him now or he will leave the hospital on his own. Aidan reluctantly agrees and they go for a pleasant afternoon in the sunshine, and then go to the brownstone. Josh, Nora, and Sally go to Donna's, but when they get there the soup kitchen has disappeared completely. With everything falling apart around them, Nora suggests to Josh that they get married soon before Sally dies. Josh's sister Emily takes Josh, Kenny, and Aidan to a strip club for Josh's bachelor party. A figure watches Aidan from across the room. A stripper, Sadie, gives Josh a lap dance in a private room, but she turns out to be a vampire seeking Josh's werewolf blood, and Aidan stakes her through the heart. Emily and Kenny see the whole thing, and Josh reveals the truth about their natures. Emily, upset, storms off. With Kenny resting after Aidan's bite, Josh and Aidan reconcile their differences. Aidan tells Sally that Ilana Myers may know how to fight Donna, and allows Sally to eat his flesh to satisfy her hunger by taking a bite from his stomach. Ilana thinks the clamshell Door must lead to somewhere on Earth rather than to the next world, and that Sally will not be able to escape it either, though once she passes through she may be able to fight back. Sally is reluctant, but Ilana says she must be very powerful, since she has survived an exorcism, and come back from the dead bringing two souls back with her. Ilana grabs an old book off of a shelf, asks how good Sally is at Latin, and prepares her to learn some magic of her own. Aidan leaves the house, still sore from Sally's bite, when the hooded figure from the strip club attacks him. After a fight, Aidan manages to stake the other man, a disfigured vampire. As he crumbles away, he asks why Aidan has done this to him, and Aidan realizes the vampire is Kat's ex-boyfriend Jeff Westin. Ray wakes Ilana, seeking to know what she has told Sally. Ilana attempts to banish the spirit from Ray's body, but Ray snaps her neck saying that Ilana picked the losing side in the fight.
38	12	"Always a Bridesmaid, Never Alive"	Stefan Pleszczynski	Lisa Randolph	April 1, 2013	137959-57	1.12
It's Josh & Nora's wedding day. Kat arrives to attend the ceremony, which Aiden will officiate. Nora discovers that Sally hasn't got long to live and they decide to postpone the wedding. As her death draws near Sally begins to feel afraid, and Aidan walks her through it, assuaging her fears as she passes away. It is only a few moments later that she feels herself awake, a ghost once more. Aiden pulls the heart from Sally's corpse, believing it will be the perfect weapon to use against Donna's black magic. Josh says his goodbyes to Nora, as the three friends go through the clamshell Door. They awake in what appears to be the soup kitchen, but Josh can see Sally perfectly, as they are now in some alternate pocket dimension that Donna calls home. Donna has brought Ray to protect her; Josh battles the wolf while Aiden and Sally confront Donna, with Sally reciting the incantation she got from Ilana; while it does have some effect, Donna reveals it was only a "true face" spell. Josh manages to behead Ray, killing him once and for all. Donna is starving and prepares to eat Sally's spirit, while commending her on fighting back. Aidan throws Sally's heart into a flame Donna has made, and it begins to immolate Donna. However, Donna uses the flames to return the source of the magical pain to Sally, whose spirit goes up in flames. Sally says she loves Aidan and Josh before Donna uses a cleaver to disperse her spirit, ingesting the dust it has left behind. Gloating over her victory, Donna radiates a bright light; then screams in agony and suddenly Josh, Aidan, and Sally's spirit are back in the bedroom, and they realize they have won. Josh says that they should postpone the wedding until after the full moon so he can properly see Sally, but Emily arrives, having come to terms with the gang's supernatural nature, and insists they have the wedding that day as planned. Later, in a cabin in the woods, Josh and Nora enjoy their honeymoon bed. When the fire dies low, Nora decides to get some more firewood, but as she exits the cabin, Liam confronts her.
39	13	"Ruh–Roh"	Stefan Pleszczynski	Anna Fricke	April 8, 2013	137959-58	1.07
At gunpoint, Liam takes Josh and Nora to a warehouse in Boston, showing them a nest of the strange new vampires created after the flu-cursed vampires drank too much werewolf blood. Liam says they kill without conscience, even young children. Liam wants to make a family with Josh and Nora, but they refuse, and Nora reveals she killed Brynn. Back at the house, Kenny has woken up, screaming in terror at what he has become. Kat discovers Sally's corpse and runs away. Aiden confesses to Sally he has long wanted a family, in part due to what happened to his wife and son (shown in flashbacks). Learning of Kenny, Liam locks Josh and Nora with the feral vampires and returns to the brownstone to kill him in revenge. Josh and Nora escape, burning the vampires away, and arrive just in time to stop Liam, but Aiden is the one to kill him, which will leave Josh a wolf forever. The ravenous Kenny drinks from Nora, and would have killed her if Josh had not stopped him. Josh admits to Nora that he now feels closer to his wolf than before, particularly after the event with Donna. Aiden has Blake compel Kat so that she forgets what she has seen. Aidan takes Kenny out to the woods, and Kenny realizes that it is the end, and that he had no control of himself. After another flashback to Suzanna's death, Aidan screams at Kenny to run away. Several days pass and it is now the morning following the full moon. Sally discovers that Donna is now spiritually connected to her; after arguing, Donna's ghost drags Sally into a bottomless chasm. Aidan is walking in town, passing by a cab that comes to a halt. As he walks off in the other direction, a woman identical to his wife Suzanna steps out of the cab, seemingly following the same path as Aidan. In the woods, Nora awakes from the previous night's full moon, but cannot find Josh. She looks around, wondering where he is, and when she finds him, he is still a wolf. She screams in terror as the scene cuts to black.
