= Being Human (North American TV series) season 2 =

Being Human
- Season 2
- Region 1 DVD cover art
- No. of episodes: 13

Release
- Original network: Syfy / Space Channel
- Original release: January 16 – April 9, 2012

Season chronology
- ← Previous; Season 1 Next → Season 3

Being Human is a supernatural drama television series developed for North American television by Jeremy Carver and Anna Fricke, based upon the British series of the same name created by Toby Whithouse. The series premiered on Syfy and Space Channel on January 17, 2011, with a thirteen episode first season and tells the story of Aidan (Sam Witwer) and Josh (Sam Huntington), a vampire and a werewolf respectively, who move into a new apartment only to discover that it is haunted by the ghost of a previous tenant, Sally (Meaghan Rath). Together, the three of them discover that being human is not as easy as it seems. Season 2 began on January 16, 2012, and adds Kristen Hager to the main cast as Josh's on-and-off girlfriend and fellow werewolf Nora, as well as Dichen Lachman as Suren, the would-be vampire queen of Boston and an old flame of Aidan's.

== Cast ==
=== Main cast ===
- Sam Witwer as Aidan Waite
- Meaghan Rath as Sally Malik
- Sam Huntington as Josh Levison
- Kristen Hager as Nora Sargeant
- Dichen Lachman as Suren

=== Recurring cast ===
- Kyle Schmid as Henry Durham
- Natalie Brown as Julia
- Dusan Dukic as Reaper/Scott
- Susanna Fournier as Zoe Gonzalez
- Deena Aziz as "Mother"
- Pat Kiely as Nick Fenn
- Robert Naylor as Stevie Adkins
- Kyle Gatehouse as Atlee
- Tracy Spiridakos as Brynn McLean
- Jon Cor as Connor McLean
- Gianpaolo Venuta as Danny Angeli
- Oluniké Adeliyi as Cecilia
- Martin Thibaudeau as Tim Forest
- Amber Goldfarb as Janet Hynes
- Alison Louder as Emily Levison
- Andreas Apergis as Ray
- Rahnuma Panthaky as Rena Malik
- Terry Kinney as Heggemann
- Mark Pellegrino as James Bishop

== Episodes ==
No. overall	No. in season	Title	Directed by	Written by	Original release date	Prod. code	US viewers (millions)
14	1	"Turn This Mother Out"	Adam Kane	Jeremy Carver & Anna Fricke	January 16, 2012	137959-34	1.81
Aidan tries to keep the peace in Boston by trying to satisfy Bishop's followers with donated blood until Mother, the queen of the vampires, arrives to pass judgement on Aidan and the others. Nora moves in with Josh, Aidan, and Sally, and while unable to see her, convinces Sally to attend her high school reunion. As the full moon approaches, Nora starts asking Josh things about what he goes through, fearing that she too is now a werewolf. Sally attends her reunion, meeting with her high school friend Stevie Adkins who committed suicide their junior year, and Diane Alcott, the vapid prom queen who died on a missionary trip in Africa. When Diane ignores Stevie, even in death, Sally confronts her, leading to Diane having a revelation and her Door appearing to send her to the other side. Upset as she missed her Door, Stevie consoles her by telling her that she can still dream in death. When she is alone that night, she sleeps and has a dream where she sees her door. When she opens it, she is attacked by some unknown dark force, causing her to abruptly wake up and find herself floating several feet in the air. Aidan appears before the council of vampires at the Halloway Hotel and Mother who decides that Bishop's "orphans" are to be culled and Aidan will be the second-in-command to her own daughter who will control Boston. She also adds that if Aidan is successful in grooming her daughter, he will be free of the council. That night, Nora drops Josh off in the woods so he can transform, and when she begins to hear his transformation, she is relieved that she has not been infected until she doubles over in pain and begins to transform, as well. As she is trapped in the car and calling out to him, Josh is shot at by Heggeman who has been tasked by Mother to kill him to remove any distractions to keep Aidan focused on her daughter. As Heggeman lifts the gun to shoot Josh again, the screen cuts to black, and a shot is heard.
15	2	"Do You Really Want to Hurt Me?"	Paolo Barzman	Nancy Won	January 23, 2012	137959-35	1.65
Josh looks at Heggeman who has him in his sights when Nora, fully transformed, attacks Heggeman and kills him. Aidan digs up Suren, Mother's daughter, and brings her to the Halloway Hotel so she can feed on willing people so she may regain her strength. Sally, horrified at the actual sensation she had in her nightmare, seeks solace with Stevie and his friends Dylan and "Boner", who Josh and Nora meet when they get home. Josh reveals to Aidan that Nora has killed Heggeman. Nora tries to clear her head as Sally reveals to Stevie she physically felt something when she opened the Door in her dream. Aidan attempts to help Suren take her place as Boston's head vampire by suggesting that they install a new vampire police officer as their assistant, but she has other plans, having chosen the still human police officer Cecilia to pick a new subject rather than one of Bishop's sires. Suren tries to get Aidan to turn her, but he refuses. Josh tries to console Nora at work when he is reminded that he has to attend the first-year med student mixer. Josh later manages to convince her to go, where she gets drunk to take solace in the fact that she is now a werewolf and that she has miscarried her and Josh's child. Dylan convinces Sally to go to a party to "Rage", where Sally discovers that ghosts can take over living people's bodies if they are willing or in a weaker state of mind. Sally relishes the fact that she can eat, drink, and feel things, again, until Dylan tries to make a move on her in their stolen bodies. Sally refuses and Stevie pulls them out of their bodies to help her, before causing Dylan to disintegrate entirely. Josh decides to drop out of medical school, and try to find a cure for his and Nora's condition instead. Aidan discovers Suren has turned Cecilia, and she tells him he will do everything to make her the best so he can be free of Mother. Sally fears that she now knows that ghosts can permanently destroy each other, but Nora convinces her that it is better to know what one is capable of, with her remembering that she did kill Heggeman as the wolf.
16	3	"All Out of Blood"	Paolo Barzman	Chris Dingess	January 30, 2012	137959-40	1.66
When Josh rents storage rooms for himself and Nora to safely "wolf out" in, Nora is far from thrilled. While they argue over it, with Nora revealing she remembers killing Heggeman, Sally, watching from a few feet away, is distracted by a dark, shadowy figure lurking in the distance before it vanishes suddenly. Meanwhile, Aidan and Julia enjoy a lovely morning together, except for the fact that Aidan almost bites her, instead taking out his urges with a blood pack. At the hospital, Josh and Sally confront Aidan about his whereabouts, and he finally admits to seeing someone he likes. Josh expresses concern but Aidan convinces him that he is fine as long as he has plenty of bagged blood to drink—which might become a problem since the hospital has started locking up their blood supplies. The nursery catches Sally's attention and she accidentally discovers nurse Zoe Gonzales, a human who can not only see and talk to ghosts but also helps them merge with babies to be reincarnated. Later that night, Josh and Aidan enjoy a brief if awkward moment of male bonding about sexual conquest but the good feelings are short lived. The next morning, they discover that the woman Aidan is seeing is Josh's former fiancé. After a painful reunion (of sorts) between Josh and Julia, tensions are high all around. Josh is angry with Aidan, who likes Julia but can no longer act on it, Nora is angry with Josh and jealous of Julia, and Julia hates Josh for leaving her. Later, Aidan approaches Julia and breaks off the relationship, both because of tensions with Josh and his inability to stop himself from feeding on her. When Sally sees Zoe helping a ghost merge with a newborn baby to become reincarnated, she makes it her goal to become reincarnated, too. After having a heart to heart with Zoe, Sally convinces her to come to the house and interview her "roommates" Aidan and Josh. Aidan and Josh pretend to be humans who can see ghosts and try to give Zoe a good impression of Sally, but Zoe passes on reincarnating her when they reveal Sally nearly killed Danny. Sally tries to jump into a baby herself, but has to stop when the dark spirit that has been following her around attacks her. She realizes that if she does jump into a baby, the spirit will kill her. Thankfully, Zoe offers Sally help in fending off the evil spirit. Without access to the hospital's blood bank, Aidan is falling deeper and deeper into despair and sickness. He cannot stop sweating, he is weak, pale and, most of all, he is hungry. Finally, he gives in and goes to a woman who lets vampires feed off her for money and he drinks his fill. Josh and Sally are not sure that Nora is going to show up for their full moon lockdown, and they are almost right. Nora spends her day stalking Julia with the intention of hurting her. Realizing she is a danger to others, Nora shows up for Sally to lock both she and Josh up before the full moon. After a few minutes, Josh and Nora's wolf forms dent the storage rooms' doors.
17	4	"(I Loathe You) For Sentimental Reasons"	Charles Binamé	Mike Ostrowski	February 6, 2012	137959-36	1.45
Aidan approaches the old woman he has been paying for her blood, but she says she can no longer give any blood but offers her daughter instead for him later. At the hospital, Josh is approached by Brynn, another werewolf, who needs him to break her twin brother Connor out before the next full moon. Sally tries to help Zoe flirt with the new surgeon, Dr. Tim Forrest, to no avail, and Zoe invites her to come to the support group she holds for ghosts. Aidan goes back to drink from the old woman's daughter, but when he discovers that she is a young child, he is revolted and runs off. He is called in by Suren to consult with a proposed addition to their group: a local mobster. Aidan believes he will not be an asset, despite Suren's insistence after the mobster brings them one of Bishop's orphans. Josh is approached by Brynn and Connor who take him out to a club, revealing that they are purebred werewolves, rather than having been turned. When Josh mentions he is seeking out a cure, it piques Connor's interest, and later when he mentions he is trying to find the biological switch that initiates the transformation to turn it off, Connor and Brynn reveal that they want to become the wolf permanently. Josh is appalled at their wishes, but with their funding he may be able to solve the problem, and asks Nora to come meet them. At Zoe's support group, Sally meets up again with Nick, at which Zoe is surprised that they know each other. After accepting what seems like a date, she talks with Zoe the following day who reveals that she is seeing Nick intimately. Nick later confirms this, and his newfound ability to avoid reliving his death day after day after meeting Zoe, which leaves Sally heartbroken. Later, while idly watching Dr. Forrest and his girlfriend Janet being intimate, Sally takes the opportunity to possess Janet so she can feel a loving embrace. While mulling over the mobster's inclusion as a vampire, Aidan has flashbacks to 1930 when his protégé Henry started to want more out of his immortal life, specifically what Suren would give them. When Aidan turned down Suren's advances, Henry took up the offer and became Suren's lover. In the present, he tells Suren that he has made up his mind and will turn the mobster. As he begins drinking the mobster's blood, he has another flashback before he starts draining the mobster dry. He proclaims that this time he will have Suren, who begins feeding on the mobster before the two vampires make love to each other.
18	5	"Addicted to Love"	Charles Binamé	Lisa Randolph	February 13, 2012	137959-37	1.35
Aidan begins to fall into bad habits as his affair with Suren gets deeper, including feeding on live blood. Their affair does not go unnoticed by Mother, who has them go after the orphans. Flashbacks to 1930 continue, with Aidan having become angered at Henry for having affairs with other women under Suren's nose. When Suren finally discovered Henry with another woman, the emotional distress led her to attack the woman in the hotel's crowded ballroom, forcing Mother to call on all of the vampires to lock down the room and kill all of the human occupants. This also led to Suren being "grounded" for the next 80 years, and Aidan warned Henry that he should not come back to Boston ever again. In the present, Sally continues to use Janet's body to enjoy the sensations of life and sex with Dr. Forrest. However, when this comes to the attention of Josh and Aidan, they warn her she should stop. She agrees, but the pull is too strong and the next time she possesses Janet she gets stuck. She seeks out Josh's help at the hospital in Janet's body, but Dr. Forrest's arrival waylays her plans. He brings her home so she can meet his mother, but the shadow entity appears before Sally, and as she yells at it, it rushes at her and removes her from Janet's body. Later, Janet comes to the gang's house, having had a part of Sally's memories stuck in her after the ordeal. When Sally goes to try to apologize with her, she finds Janet drawing the shadowy figure fervishly, until she writes down the name "Reaper" on one of the drawings. Elsewhere, Josh has been sharing his plans to find the cure with Connor, Brynn, and an irritated Nora. Nora's condition is only made worse when her abusive ex-boyfriend Will has come to town. With the full moon approaching, Connor manages to convince Josh to retaliate against Will for what he did to Nora, but during the beating, Nora comes to intervene. Although she is angry at Josh for his actions in becoming like Will, he apologizes to her and promises to meet her at the storage center that night. However, Brynn talks to Nora first, knowing that she is not willing to be cured. Nora reveals that she has been stalking Will ever since he came into town, and has been waiting for the full moon to come to exact her own revenge. That night, three werewolves viciously attack Will, devouring him. Josh wakes up in the warehouse alone, while Nora wakes up satiated in the woods with Brynn and Connor.
19	6	"Mama Said There'd Be Decades Like These"	Stefan Pleszczynski	Jeremy Carver & Anna Fricke	February 20, 2012	137959-38	1.43
After trying to get in contact with Nora who is not returning his calls, Josh goes to clean out a room when he discovers that a dying patient is Sally's mother Rena. While Sally tries to get Josh to make her father comfortable, and make sure that her mother does not spend the afterlife in a hospital gown, Josh crosses paths with two detectives who inform him that Will has been found dead and they are looking for Nora. Elsewhere, Aidan hunts down the orphan's vampire dens to find Henry, but has no luck, so he instead takes out his energy by drinking blood. However, he gets so drunk on the blood that he begins to see visions of Bishop, who advises Aidan to hunt down Henry and kill him. When Rena dies, Sally greets her ghost to try to reconnect with her, but Rena has other plans which involve reuniting with their dead neighbor Gerry Patterson who she was having an affair with before he died ten years ago. Sally gets upset that her mother would rather continue an affair than spend time looking after her family, but her mother says she did not want to come see Sally because she is still living in the house where she was killed. Josh tries to confront Connor and Brynn about the cops and Nora's disappearance, but their elitist attitude, particularly regarding how Will's corpse shows he could not have been killed by a human, puts him off. He goes to ask Aidan if Cecilia could help him, but Aidan is too preoccupied with visions of Bishop to be of assistance. Josh approaches Cecilia on his own, offering up the purebred werewolves in return for her services in taking the cops off the case, which she follows through with when the two detectives find Josh at his storage unit and she uses her vampiric suggestion powers to remove Josh from their radar. That night, Josh tells Connor and Brynn that he has gotten rid of the cops, while also tipping off Cecilia to their location. Aidan has flashbacks to his time coming back from overseas after World War I, introducing Henry to Bishop, who believes Henry has a rebellious streak in him. Back in the present, Henry and Aidan have their confrontation, with Aidan nearly killing Henry but giving up at the last minute, knowing he cannot kill his own son. He promises Henry that he will find a way to reincorporate him into the vampire fold, regardless of having ruined everything in the past regarding Suren's actions.
20	7	"The Ties That Blind"	Stefan Pleszczynski	Céline Geiger	February 27, 2012	137959-39	1.36
Josh and Nora awake nude in the woods after a full moon, unsure of the events the night before. In a flashback to 24 hours earlier, Aidan and Josh are preparing to leave for work when they realize that strange things are happening, and believe Sally is losing control of her abilities, but she claims it is not her but some poltergeist come to bother her. At the hospital, Josh finds Nora who is still conflicted over what happened. Josh reveals she hurt him by leaving without any answer, and mentions that the twins said they were in contact with her, which they were not. Elsewhere in the hospital, Aidan is approached by Atlee of the Dutch who believes Aidan knows something about Heggeman's disappearance. Back at the house, Sally continues to see the effects of the poltergeist, and when she ascends the stairs, it attacks her, with the threatening voice of Danny. She goes to see Aidan at the hospital, wondering if Danny is somehow behind the Reaper's appearance, but they soon discover that Danny was murdered in prison. Aidan tells her to use iron to disperse Danny's essence and assures her that she is the stronger ghost, if he is truly the Reaper, and then confronts Josh about Cecilia's sudden disappearance. Josh reveals that Cecilia did help him, and in exchange he told her that the twins killed Heggeman. When he finally gets Cecilia's phone to pick up, Connor is on the other line, revealing that they have captured Cecilia and want to have a showdown with Aidan in the woods that night: a full moon. Aidan tells Atlee that he knows where the purebred wolves who killed Heggeman are and have him come along to save Cecilia and get revenge. Elsewhere, Nora and Josh have a fight, as Nora (and the twins) believe Cecilia was sent by Aidan to kill the twins, and she goes to the woods to change with the twins. At the house, Sally has her showdown with Danny, who reveals his ghostly form. While Sally believes she has the upper hand, Danny's death in prison has taught him more in a short period of time and overpowers her until the Reaper appears to kill Danny's spirit, before taking on a more corporeal form. The Reaper tells Sally that she is an aberration in the natural order, as she passed over her door, and he has come to remove her from existence, but Danny's death has given her more time. Josh goes to a shed in the woods where Nora and the twins are preparing for the full moon. But Josh is surprised when Aidan arrives, as the twins have brought him for a vampire hunt. Josh reveals that he was the one who gave the twins' location to Cecilia, which surprises Nora and the twins. As Josh and Nora start to transform, Aidan retreats into the woods to inform Atlee that they will have to face four werewolves, instead of two, and Atlee retreats. Josh, Nora, and the twins hunt Aidan through the woods until he manages to find Cecilia, and Heggeman's rifle. As the rifle has no ammunition and Cecilia is too weak to be of any help to Aidan, she pleads with him to leave her behind so he may be safe. He lets her down and makes his escape as the werewolves tear Cecilia apart. Sally meets up with the Reaper, again, who realizes that she is a special case, but the order must be restored and she should say her goodbyes. The next morning, Josh and Nora wake, and Nora's revelation that she likes being the wolf more and does not want the cure Josh truly wants leads to their breakup. They meet up with the twins, with Connor amazed that Josh tried to kill them when Aidan returns and uses Heggeman's rifle to shoot Connor with a silver bullet, killing him as he reverts to his wolf form. Brynn breaks down in tears at the death of her brother as Aidan leaves with Connor's body to present to Atlee so he may say he is the one who took revenge for Heggeman's death, so long as he never returns to Boston. Josh and Aidan return to the house, where Sally wants to tell them about the Reaper, but they are in no mood to talk, leaving Sally ready to leave without saying goodbye.
21	8	"I've Got You Under Your Skin"	Stefan Schwartz	Nancy Won	March 5, 2012	137959-41	1.40
It has been a week since the events of the full moon. Sally is on edge as the Reaper has not sought her out to "shred" her, but he appears to her to give her an ultimatum as he has found a loophole. Sally can either be reaped or become the new Reaper. Josh has been out of work for the past week, in a slump since the breakup with Nora. Aidan, however, has called in Emily to cheer Josh up. When Sally asks Aidan for advice on the Reaper, he suggests she shred him before he gets the chance to shred her. Emily plans Josh's recovery from the breakup, saying that the two of them should go out drinking. Sally goes to see Stevie to ask his advice on how to shred ghosts, but he warns her that shredding makes ghosts dark and it is not something she wants to do. Aidan meets with Suren who is upset that Cecilia has been killed. Suren also reveals that Mother will be making a trip to Boston to check on her progress, but she has lied to her and said that Bishop's orphans have been culled so they must take care of them. Aidan hunts down Henry to warn him, finding him at the house of a human who offers passage across the threshold in exchange for money. Aidan tells Henry to gather all of the orphans at the house because he has found a way to save them and Henry. Josh leaves work early, as the hospital reminds him too much of Nora, and catches up with Emily at the bar where he finds she has been hanging out with Julia. Still not ready to face his ex-fiancée, Josh orders drinks, which is out of character for him. As the night goes on, Sally ultimately faces the Reaper, managing to shred him before he can do the same to her. However, the Reaper quickly reforms his spiritual form, surprised that Sally had the gall to attack him, but also instilling the exhilaration in her of being a Reaper. Realizing she has no way out, she takes on his offer to be a Reaper and he takes her out on her first assignment. Elsewhere, the orphans gather at Henry's beckoning where Aidan promises them that they will have safe passage to Baltimore, where the vampire society has no hold. However, the owner of the house is brought in front of Suren who offers to buy the house from him for a large sum of money. He agrees, and her living lawyer takes ownership of the house. Aidan and Henry quickly trap the orphans in the basement and escape the house as the lawyer uninvites the vampires from his new house, causing the orphans to turn to ash. Henry is upset, but Aidan reminds him that this is the only way to end his exile. At the bar, Julia throws insults at Josh, feeling somehow relieved at his worse situation, until Emily needs to be taken home as she has drunk too much and hit on a straight girl. At Julia's apartment, after they put Emily to bed, Julia realizes she has come to Boston to find Josh and to find answers. Josh tells her as much of the truth as possible (without revealing his transformation into a werewolf), saying he did not want to hurt her, and leaves the apartment to head back home. The Reaper takes Sally to Stevie, saying that he has been shredding too many ghosts and is stalking his former bully to shred him once he dies and that he must be reaped. Sally, upset that she will have to reap her best friend, tries to talk to Stevie to find a way out of him being reaped, but when he admits he will shred his former bully, Sally realizes she cannot help him and the Reaper shreds him. Aidan presents Henry to Suren, who is ready to take out revenge for what he did 80 years prior by flaying him alive. Aidan tells Henry this is the only way he can re-enter vampire society and leaves him in Suren's hands. The next day, Aidan sees that Sally is still on this plane of existence, and Josh sees Emily off, but not before she tells him he missed his chance to have angry and drunk makeup sex with Julia.
22	9	"When I Think About You I Shred Myself"	Stefan Schwartz	Mike Ostrowski	March 12, 2012	137959-42	1.36
Aidan takes Henry back to the house so he may be able to recover from being skinned alive by Suren, while Josh and Sally go off to their respective "jobs". Sally and the Reaper discuss her new duties, which begins with shredding Walter, a ghost from Zoe's support group, after he starts possessing, again. She is not yet ready, so the Reaper takes matters into his own hands. At the hospital, Josh and Julia have some small talk, as they were better friends than future spouses, until Josh sees his old friend Stu, who did not survive the werewolf attack years ago. Stu has been living as a ghost in Ithaca and has come to see Josh, who he knows is a werewolf. Sally returns to the house after meeting with the Reaper to find Boner, who the Reaper told her was shredded by Stevie. She goes to Zoe and Nick for advice, and they say she should come to the support group for help. At the hospital, with Stu's "assistance", Josh and Julia begin to rekindle their relationship during a required sexual harassment seminar. At the house, Aidan has brought two willing young women to bring Henry back to health, using his mental powers to make them believe Henry is not missing his skin, so Henry may feed without killing them. This brings back memories of when they first met in 1918 France, when Henry was an Allied Powers medic, and still alive, and Aidan was a soldier who "miraculously" survived a German attack. While the attending physician tells Henry not to give Aidan morphine and leave him to die, Aidan orders Henry to remove the bullets from his body, healing quickly as time passes. When an injured French soldier comes to the field hospital, Aidan drinks the blood from his discarded wound dressings, but not without the French soldier seeing him. He begins to rant and rave that Aidan is a vampire, but Henry protects Aidan's identity until the French soldier tries to stake Aidan. Henry intervenes in the scuffle until he is staked. Aidan drinks from his blood before wiping out the entire field hospital, save for Henry, who he sires into a vampire and saves a survivor for him to be his first kill. Josh and Julia meet at a bar, where Julia asks if they should become intimate. Stu pushes Josh not to follow through, and Josh leaves, until he apparently has a change of mind. They return to Julia's apartment, where it is revealed that Stu has possessed Josh to make love to Julia. Josh awakes in the night and confronts Stu about what he did, realizing that Stu has only come to Boston to follow her. Now Josh can either break her heart or put her in danger around the full moon. When Julia awakens to find Josh by himself, she curls up next to him, and Josh ultimately chooses to stay with her. Sally heads to the support group, but she finds that the Reaper has shredded all of the ghosts before she could make it. She tries to talk to Zoe, but Zoe fears her for reasons she does not understand. Back at the house, Aidan's mental suggestion to the two girls starts to wear off, and they see the blood covering them and Henry. Aidan decides to kill both of them, and Henry takes his fill. The next day, Josh returns to the house to find Henry with his skin, and Aidan overseeing movers taking away two large boxes dripping with blood, angering Josh when he realizes what has happened. Inside, Nick approaches Sally, saying he will find a way to help her, while she is struggling to salt herself in to protect herself from the Reaper, which suddenly appears to attack Nick for falling in love with a living person. Sally yells at the Reaper to leave Nick alone, and proclaims she will never be like him, until the Reaper takes her appearance and says she is already him. Sally flashes back to when Tony told her that the longer ghosts stay on the living plane, they begin to lose connection with reality. She then realizes that the Reaper is only a manifestation of her dark side and she has been the one responsible for all of the Reaper's shreddings. Aidan and Josh come into the house just as Sally shreds Nick, and then proceeds to attack the boys until Aidan uses an iron fire poker to disperse her essence. The two trap her in a ring of salt on the staircase, and when she awakes she proceeds to scream at them in a demonic voice to let her go.
23	10	"Dream Reaper"	Paolo Barzman	Keto Shimizu	March 19, 2012	137959-43	1.43
Aidan and Josh try to figure out what to do with Sally, who has fallen into a catatonic state since the "Reaper" took over. As Aidan has never encountered something like this in the past, they decide to seek out Zoe's help, even though Sally has just shredded Nick. Zoe is reluctant at first, as she watched Sally shred all of her ghosts, but Aidan pleads with her to help and she agrees. Upon learning the full story, she realizes that Sally's subconscious has created the Reaper as a form of feeling guilty for passing up her door, and this entity has taken hold of Sally. Inside Sally's mind, she is living out a fantasy where she is still alive and she is living in the house with her fiancé "Scott", the Reaper personality. As Sally is preparing breakfast, she sees Josh's reflection in a microwave, but she cannot remember him. Meanwhile, Scott is continuously pushing her that they should move out of the house, an attempt to make sure his personality will overwrite Sally's. Aidan and Josh's attempts to contact Sally while she is out cold anger "Scott", deciding to trap them all in the house, and once he puts Sally in bed in her mind, making her think she is ill, she takes control of Sally's ghostly body. He first taunts them, bringing up Aidan's murders and Josh's breakup with Nora, before revealing to Zoe that Nick has been shredded. Aidan is beginning to feel the effects of live blood withdrawal, and Zoe is tempting him, and it is also the night of the full moon. If Sally is not saved, Zoe will be killed by one of the housemates. The two try to push Zoe to save Sally, even if they are all trapped together, but her insistence that she will not help forces the two to reveal their supernatural natures. Zoe attempts a "mind meld" with Sally, hoping that by contacting Sally's mind she will be able to free herself. As their consciousnesses merge, Zoe falls limp. She finds herself at Sally and "Scott's" engagement party, where she does her best to convince Sally that she is living in a fantasy and that "Scott" is not who he seems. To try to convince her, Zoe reminds Sally that she has shredded Nick, but Nick is alive and well in her fantasy. In the house, Josh tries to find a way to shift in the house without killing either Zoe or Aidan, but Aidan cannot hold back and begins feeding on Zoe until Josh tears him away. He then offers up his blood to Aidan to drink from to keep Zoe alive, and after some hesitation he drinks from Josh, feeling an immediate buzz from the werewolf blood, until he starts to convulse in pain. In Sally's mind, Zoe is beginning to get through to her, as Sally remembers Nick's drowning death, until "Scott" attacks Zoe. It is not until Aidan lets out a ghastly scream from his body violently rejecting Josh's blood that Sally's self-contained illusion is broken, leaving only Sally, Zoe, and "Scott" left. With the illusion failing, allowing Sally to see Aidan in pain and Josh trying to revive him does she reject "Scott" and goes through her death once more, awakening in her ghostly body, freeing everyone. Zoe walks off, still angry, and Josh breaks the salt ring before running off to the woods to change. Aidan, recovered but seeping blood from every orifice, welcomes Sally home before he goes upstairs to rest. Zoe comes back with dressing on her wound to tell Sally she will never forgive her for what she did to Nick. Sally is left alone, except for "Scott" who reminds her that he is a part of her and will always be there, waiting for her to slip, again.
24	11	"Don't Fear the Scott"	Paolo Barzman	Chris Dingess	March 26, 2012	137959-44	1.25
Suren feels confident that she has fulfilled Mother's demand of her to put Boston back into order, and Aidan knows that he will no longer be forced to be involved with the vampire community, and the two will be able to freely spend time together. Elsewhere, Josh and Julia enjoy time with each other, with Josh asking her if she would not mind coming to his place, but Julia still feels hurt from the break-up with Aidan. Sally does her best to ignore "Scott", who insists that she acknowledge he still exists as a part of her. She later reveals to the boys that "Scott" is still bothering her, but she thinks that if she makes amends for what she has done she may be able to get rid of him. Aidan mentions that Janet, who Sally had possessed months ago, has been admitted to Suffolk County Hospital's psychiatric ward. The next day, she goes to see Janet and believes that if Josh acts as a go between she can help Janet, but Josh refuses to help. Elsewhere, Josh asks Aidan if he could bring Suren over to serve as a double date so Julia could feel more comfortable coming over, and he acquiesces. Aidan convinces Suren to follow through, as if she is to become a part of his life she has to accept his mundane life. The dinner goes through several awkward silences, until Suren and Josh bond over liking Antiques Roadshow. Things take a turn when Suren realizes Julia and Aidan dated, without Aidan having told her, but nothing happens between the girls. That night, Aidan comforts Suren in the fact that she has a place in his life. Josh and Julia arrive at hospital for work the next day only to find Nora has come back. Julia leaves the two alone, and Nora reveals that Brynn was not the person she thought and she wants to make amends with Josh, but he has fallen back in love with Julia. Sally finds Nora in the hospital, who cannot get her job back, and after revealing the events of the past couple of weeks, Sally convinces Nora to help her get through to Janet. Elsewhere in the hospital, Julia presses Josh to make the right choice between her and Nora. With the Reaper egging her on to stop helping, Sally, through Nora, manages to convince Janet she is not crazy and that she is sorry for what she has done. Feeling stronger in herself, "Scott" disappears just as Josh sees that Sally had Nora help her, cementing the decision in his mind to stay with Julia. At the Halloway Hotel, Mother states her pleasure in how Suren and Aidan have put Boston back in order. She still feels Suren is not ready to leave, forcing her to keep her place in Boston. However, Mother does not go back on her deal with Aidan, but instead of freedom she excommunicates Aidan from vampire society, with threat of death to anyone who disobeys. After asking Henry to send a message, Aidan and Suren meet and decide to leave Boston. After saying a tearful goodbye to Josh and Sally, Aidan leaves the house to go on the run with Suren. Later, Nora goes to see Josh one more time, still wanting to make amends, by revealing she has found the way to lift the werewolf curse. Josh has to kill Ray, the werewolf who turned him, but not during a full moon. Aidan and Suren make it to a seedy hotel, but when Suren says she is hungry, Aidan leaves the room to find a suitable victim to only find Henry has given up their location and has brought reinforcements to kill Aidan.
25	12	"Partial Eclipse of the Heart"	Adam Kane	Lisa Randolph	April 2, 2012	137959-45	1.27
Aidan prepares to face off against Henry and the two vampires he brought with him when Henry helps Aidan in killing the other vampires, having only saved face by pretending to hunt down Aidan and Suren. Henry wants to help Aidan go on the run, but knows that Suren's presence will prevent that. While Aidan thanks Henry, he also partially stakes him so he can tell Mother a good story while he remains with Suren. Back in Boston, Josh goes to seek out Ray, with Nora's knowledge that killing him will cure the both of them, but he sees that Ray has reunited with his family. Ray finds Josh and advises him that he should tell his loved ones the truth, something that Josh struggles with when he returns to Boston to find that his and Julia's old mutual friend from Ithaca Chelsea has come to town to see the both of them. While he deals with reuniting with an old friend, Sally seeks out Zoe at the hospital to ask for forgiveness, but cannot find her in the nursery. Sally manages to find her, when Zoe reveals that being in the nursery only gives her bad memories and she does not want to help ghosts anymore. At a restaurant, Josh has met up with Julia and Chelsea to reveal they are a couple, once more. When Julia gets up from the table, Chelsea sternly asks Josh to tell Julia the truth about matters, before leaving when Julia returns. Sally follows Zoe, trying to get her to change her mind about ghosts when they realize that there is a solar eclipse happening. Walter, one of the ghosts Sally shredded, suddenly appears in the park, and when Sally tells Zoe this is where she shredded him she remembers that solar eclipses somehow weaken the barrier between the living and spiritual worlds. Sally realizes that means Nick must have rematerialized as well, and they both head to the brownstone. Julia and Josh enjoy each other's company, and just as Josh is ready to tell Julia that he is a werewolf the solar eclipse begins to affect him, as well, beginning a partial transformation. He runs out of the restaurant, Julia following him, until he is met with a dead end in an alleyway. He turns to face Julia, partially transformed, startling her as she backs up into the street and is hit by a car. Josh rushes to her aid, but still transforming, runs away from the growing crowd. Sally makes it to the house to talk to Nick, who reveals that they are in some sort of terrifying purgatory, that they call Limbo, where they can only feel pain but not existence. When Zoe arrives, Sally stays with Danny who is actually happy to see her, knowing that he somewhat deserves his fate in Limbo, while Nick lies to Zoe that he is now in a better place. The eclipse ends and the two return to purgatory. Zoe thanks Sally for letting her see Nick one last time, while Sally feels guilty that she has put so many in such a terrifying place. Aidan, however, has driven many miles to Lancaster County, Pennsylvania, to the hiding place of the Dutch to seek help from Atlee, who has since been made the leader of the Dutch because of the werewolf Aidan gave him. Aidan blackmails him into giving himself and Suren a place to hide and returns to the motel, only to find that Suren has left. Suren, feeling the blood withdrawal symptoms and not enjoying her situation has returned to Boston on her own to reclaim her place as its leader. That night, Josh returns to the accident scene to reveal the truth to Julia, but she reveals that she has already died and Josh is speaking to her ghost. She tells him he should have been truthful from the start, but she has always loved him, before her Door appears and she uses it to pass through to the other side.
26	13	"It's My Party and I'll Die If I Want To"	Adam Kane	Jeremy Carver & Anna Fricke	April 9, 2012	137959-46	1.38
Josh resolves to kill Ray to save both himself and Nora from the werewolf curse while Aidan resolves to kill Mother so he and Suren may be together at last. Josh enlists Sally to possess Ray's wife, using her to call Ray out to a deserted stretch of road under the guise of fixing a flat tire. However, this act brings the Reaper entity back into Sally's mind. Once Ray arrives, Josh marches Ray out into the woods at gunpoint. Meanwhile, Aidan infiltrates Mother's coven and attempts to kill her and finds that Henry (who helped Aidan get inside) has been severely beaten and may be dead. Aidan is eventually captured and brought before Mother, who kills Suren in front of him. As she turns to ashes, Aidan screams in fury and attempts to kill Mother but is overpowered. Aidan is then locked in a coffin and buried alive. Elsewhere, Sally returns to the hospital to seek out her mother so she may shred her in order for Sally to be able to enter Limbo to save all of the ghosts she shredded herself, as taking another ghost's Door would condemn them to insanity. Rena refuses to kill her own daughter, and after she disappears Sally comes across Nora and she tells her Josh's plans. Sally returns to their shared house, the Reaper still taunting her, as Rena approaches her to tell Sally how proud she is of her now that she's become so strong in death. The reconciliation brings Rena's Door forth and she offers it to Sally, believing that if she can find a way back from the Door, another will come for her. Sally thanks her mother for the offer, but takes her fate into her own hands by shredding herself, all while the Reaper protests until he too is destroyed with Sally's spirit. Back in the woods, Josh hesitates shooting Ray, who then attacks Josh and knocks the gun from his hand. Before Ray can kill Josh, Nora arrives armed with her own weapon. She and Ray have a stand-off and everything fades to black as a gunshot is heard. With Aidan buried alive and Josh's fate unknown, the empty brownhouse is quiet until a radio starts to tune itself into a particular station. Sally's voice plays over the radio, revealing she has found a way out of Limbo but she needs the boys' help to succeed.
