= Brooklyn Bridge (TV series) =

American sitcom (1991–1993)

- Brooklyn Bridge cast photo
- Genre: Sitcom/Comedy drama
- Created by: Gary David Goldberg
- Starring: Marion Ross; Jenny Lewis; Jake Jundef; Aeryk Egan; Amy Aquino; David Wohl; Louis Zorich; Adam LaVorgna; Danny Gerard; Matthew Louis Siegel; Peter Friedman; Armin Shimerman
- Theme music composer: Marvin Hamlisch; Alan and Marilyn Bergman
- Opening theme: "Just Over the Brooklyn Bridge" performed by Art Garfunkel
- Composer: David McHugh
- Country of origin: United States
- Original language: English
- No. of seasons: 2
- No. of episodes: 35 (includes 2 two-part episodes)

Production
- Executive producers: Gary David Goldberg; Sam Weisman
- Camera setup: Single-camera
- Running time: 30 minutes
- Production companies: Ubu Productions; Paramount Television

Original release
- Network: CBS
- Release: September 20, 1991 – August 6, 1993

Brooklyn Bridge is an American sitcom television series which aired on CBS from September 20, 1991, to August 6, 1993. It is about a Jewish American family living in Brooklyn in the mid-1950s. The premise was partially based on the childhood of executive producer and creator Gary David Goldberg.

Brooklyn Bridge won a Golden Globe for Best Television Comedy or Musical and was nominated for the Primetime Emmy Award for Outstanding Comedy Series in 1992. In 1997, "When Irish Eyes Are Smiling" was ranked number 46 on TV Guide's 100 Greatest Episodes of All Time.

While the show received acclaim, low ratings were present from the get-go. By November 1992, CBS put the show on hiatus, which Goldberg believed was a lie done to quietly kill the show off. Despite a grassroots viewer campaign by the Viewers for Quality Television and others, the show was cancelled at the end of the following year.

== DVD release ==
Gary David Goldberg had announced on his official website that CBS Home Entertainment (with distribution by Paramount Home Entertainment) would release the complete series of Brooklyn Bridge on DVD in Region 1 in the middle of May 2010. However, the DVD was later delayed indefinitely; Goldberg died in 2013. Bootleg copies of select episodes in VHS quality were once available on YouTube.

== Cast ==
=== Main ===
- Marion Ross as Sophie Berger
- Danny Gerard as Alan Silver
- Louis Zorich as Jules Berger
- Amy Aquino as Phyllis Berger Silver
- Peter Friedman as George Silver
- Matthew Louis Siegel as Nathaniel Silver
- David Wohl as Sid Elgart
- Adam LaVorgna as Nicholas Scamperelli
- Jake Jundef as Benny Belinsky

=== Recurring ===
- Jenny Lewis as Katie Monahan
- Constance McCashin as Rosemary Monahan
- James Naughton as Lt. Patrick Monahan

=== Guest ===
- Joel Grey as Jacob, Sophie Berger's cousin, a Holocaust survivor from Poland (2 episodes)

== Episodes ==
=== Series overview ===
Season	Episodes	Originally released	
Season	Episodes	First released	Last released
1	22	September 20, 1991	April 20, 1992
2	13	September 13, 1992	August 6, 1993

=== Season 1 (1991–92) ===
No. overall	No. in season	Title	Directed by	Written by	Original release date	Viewers (millions)
1	1	"When Irish Eyes Are Smiling"	Sam Weisman	Gary David Goldberg	September 20, 1991	15.5
2	2	"When Irish Eyes Are Smiling"	Sam Weisman	Gary David Goldberg	September 20, 1991	15.5
3	3	"Death in Brooklyn"	Sam Weisman	Brad Hall	September 27, 1991	14.0
4	4	"Boys of Summer"	Bradley Silberling	John Masius	October 4, 1991	12.9
5	5	"Sylvia's Condition"	Sam Weisman	Peter Schneider & Ben Cardinale	October 18, 1991	7.6
6	6	"What I Did for Love"	Donald Reiker	Theresa Rebeck	October 25, 1991	8.3
7	7	"War of the Worlds"	Sam Weisman	S : Peter Schneider & Ben Cardinale; T : Gary David Goldberg and Brad Hall	November 6, 1991	13.4
8	8	"War of the Worlds"	Sam Weisman	S : Peter Schneider & Ben Cardinale; T : Gary David Goldberg and Brad Hall	November 6, 1991	13.4
9	9	"Dinner at Six"	Sam Weisman	Gary David Goldberg & Brad Hall	November 13, 1991	13.1
10	10	"Old Fools"	Kristoffer Tabori	Peter Schneider & Ben Cardinale	November 20, 1991	13.4
11	11	"Saturday"	Donald Reiker	Brad Hall & John Masius	November 27, 1991	12.9
12	12	"Get a Job"	Sam Weisman	Brad Hall	December 8, 1991	14.5
13	13	"Where Have You Gone, Jackie Robinson?"	Sam Weisman	Gary David Goldberg & Brad Hall	December 11, 1991	12.6
14	14	"The Gift"	Seth Freeman	Seth Freeman & Brad Hall	January 1, 1992	21.1
15	15	"Boys and Girls Together"	Sam Weisman	Gary David Goldberg & Brad Hall	January 15, 1992	12.3
16	16	"Boys and Girls Apart"	Sam Weisman	Gary David Goldberg & Brad Hall	January 22, 1992	13.0
17	17	"Boys and Girls Together Again"	Sam Weisman	Gary David Goldberg & Brad Hall	January 29, 1992	13.8
18	18	"On the Road"	Sam Weisman	Theresa Rebeck	February 5, 1992	12.0
19	19	"Great Expectations"	Brad Silberling	Lisa Melamed	March 4, 1992	11.8
20	20	"A Tale of Two Boroughs"	Brad Silberling	Gary David Goldberg and Brad Hall	March 11, 1992	11.7
21	21	"Rainy Day"	Michael J. Fox	Brad Hall & John Masius	April 13, 1992	15.4
22	22	"On the Line"	Kenneth Zunder	Peter Schneider & Ben Cardinale	April 20, 1992	16.4

=== Season 2 (1992–93) ===
No. overall	No. in season	Title	Directed by	Written by	Original release date	Viewers (millions)
23	1	"Brave New Worlds"	Sam Weisman	Seth Freeman, Gary David Goldberg, and Brad Hall	September 13, 1992	14.4
24	2	"Plaza Sweet"	Donald Reiker	Brad Hall	September 19, 1992	8.0
25	3	"Rockette to the Moon"	Sam Weisman	Patricia Jones and Donald Reiker	September 26, 1992	8.5
26	4	"Nun But the Brave"	Sandy Smolan	Bud Wiser	October 3, 1992	8.4
27	5	"In the Still of the Night"	Sam Weisman	Brad Hall	November 7, 1992	8.9
28	6	"The Last Immigrant"	Sam Weisman	Peter Schneider & Ben Cardinale	November 14, 1992	9.7
29	7	"In a Family Way"	Sam Weisman	Brad Hall	April 10, 1993	11.0
30	8	"Good as Gold"	Sam Weisman	S : Joyce Maynard; T : Gary David Goldberg & Brad Hall	April 17, 1993	10.1
31	9	"The Wild Pitch"	Craig Zisk	Patricia Jones and Donald Reiker	April 24, 1993	8.8
32	10	"The Date"	Brad Hall	Joseph Purdy	July 16, 1993	6.0
33	11	"Keeping Up with the Joneses"	Sam Weisman	Brad Hall	July 23, 1993	5.3
34	12	"The Hollywood Country Club"	Kenneth Zunder	Peter Schneider	July 30, 1993	6.4
35	13	"No Time Like the Future"	James Simons	S : Ben Cardinale; S/T : Peter Schneider	August 6, 1993	6.2

== Awards and nominations ==
Year	Award	Category	Recipient	Result
1992	American Cinema Editors' Eddie Award	Best Edited Episode from a Television Series	Roger Bondelli, Jerry U. Frizell and Ron Volk (For episode "War of the Worlds")	Won
1993	American Cinema Editors' Eddie Award	Best Edited Half Hour Series for Television	Roger Bondelli (For episode "Brave New World")	Won
1993	American Society of Cinematographers Award	Outstanding Achievement in Cinematography in Regular Series	Kenneth Zunder	Nominated
1993	American Television Awards	Best Actress, Situation Comedy	Marion Ross	Nominated
1992	Golden Globe Award	Best Television Series – Musical or Comedy		Won
1993	Golden Globe Award	Best Television Series – Musical or Comedy		Nominated
1992	Humanitas Prize	30 Minute Category	John Masius	Won
1992	Humanitas Prize	60 Minute Category	Gary David Goldberg (For episode "When Irish Eyes Are Smiling")	Nominated
1992	Primetime Emmy Award	Outstanding Comedy Series	Gary David Goldberg, Sam Weisman, Seth Freeman, Brad Hall, Alice West and Craig Zisk	Nominated
1992	Primetime Emmy Award	Outstanding Lead Actress in a Comedy Series	Marion Ross	Nominated
1992	Primetime Emmy Award	Outstanding Directing for a Comedy Series	Sam Weisman (For episode "When Irish Eyes Are Smiling")	Nominated
1992	Primetime Emmy Award	Outstanding Main Title Design	Ed Sullivan and Judy Korin	Nominated
1992	Primetime Emmy Award	Outstanding Main Title Theme Music	Marvin Hamlisch, Alan Bergman and Marilyn Bergman (For episode "When Irish Eyes Are Smiling")	Nominated
1992	Primetime Emmy Award	Outstanding Editing for a Series - Single Camera Production	Roger Bondelli, Jerry U. Frizell and Ron Volk (For episode "War of the Worlds")	Nominated
1992	Primetime Emmy Award	Outstanding Costumes for a Series	Linda M. Bass (For episode "War of the Worlds")	Nominated
1992	Primetime Emmy Award	Outstanding Sound Mixing for a Comedy Series or a Special	David Schneiderman, Jim Fitzpatrick, Bruce P. Michaels and Gary Montgomery (For episode "Get a Job")	Nominated
1993	Primetime Emmy Award	Outstanding Lead Actress in a Comedy Series	Marion Ross	Nominated
1993	Primetime Emmy Award	Outstanding Guest Actor in a Comedy Series	Joel Grey	Nominated
1993	Primetime Emmy Award	Outstanding Editing for a Series - Single Camera Production	Ron Volk (For episode "In the Still of the Night")	Nominated
1993	Primetime Emmy Award	Outstanding Sound Mixing for a Comedy Series or a Special	David M. Ronne, Bruce P. Michaels, Gary Montgomery and Jim Fitzpatrick (For episode "The Wild Pitch")	Nominated
1992	Producers Guild of America Award	Outstanding Producer of Television	Gary David Goldberg	Won
1992	Television Critics Association Award	Program of the Year		Nominated
1992	Television Critics Association Award	Outstanding Achievement in Comedy		Nominated
1992	Viewers for Quality Television Award	Best Quality Comedy Series		Won
1992	Viewers for Quality Television Award	Best Actress in a Quality Comedy Series	Marion Ross	Won
1993	Viewers for Quality Television Award	Best Quality Comedy Series		Won
1993	Viewers for Quality Television Award	Best Actress in a Quality Comedy Series	Marion Ross	Won
1993	Viewers for Quality Television Award	Best Specialty Player	Joel Grey	Nominated
1993	Writers Guild of America Award	Episodic Comedy	Gary David Goldberg (For episode "When Irish Eyes Are Smiling")	Nominated
1992	Young Artist Award	Best New Family Television Series		Won
1992	Young Artist Award	Best Young Actor Starring in a New Television Series	Danny Gerard	Nominated
1992	Young Artist Award	Exceptional Performance by a Young Actor Under 10	Matthew Louis Seigel	Nominated
1993	Young Artist Award	Best Young Actor Starring in a Television Series	Danny Gerard	Nominated
1993	Young Artist Award	Best Young Actor Co-Starring in a Television Series	Adam LaVorgna	Won
1993	Young Artist Award	Best Young Actress Co-Starring in a Television Series	Jenny Lewis	Nominated
1993	Young Artist Award	Best Young Actor Recurring in a Television Series	Aeryk Egan	Won
1993	Young Artist Award	Best Young Actress Guest-Starring in a Television Series	Lisa Paige Robinson	Nominated
1993	Young Artist Award	Outstanding Actor Under 10 in a Television Series	Matthew Louis Seigel	Nominated
