= Being Human (North American TV series) season 1 =

Being Human
- Season 1
- Region 1 DVD cover art
- No. of episodes: 13

Release
- Original network: Syfy / Space Channel
- Original release: January 17 – April 11, 2011

Season chronology
- Next → Season 2

Being Human is a supernatural drama television series developed for North American television by Jeremy Carver and Anna Fricke, based upon the British series of the same name created by Toby Whithouse. The series premiered on Syfy and Space Channel on January 17, 2011, with a thirteen episode first season and tells the story of Aidan (Sam Witwer) and Josh (Sam Huntington), a vampire and a werewolf respectively, who move into a new apartment only to discover that it is haunted by the ghost of a previous tenant, Sally (Meaghan Rath). Together, the three of them discover that being human is not as easy as it seems.

== Cast ==
=== Main cast ===
- Sam Witwer as Aidan Waite
- Meaghan Rath as Sally Malik
- Sam Huntington as Josh Levison
- Mark Pellegrino as James Bishop

=== Recurring cast ===
- Gianpaolo Venuta as Danny Angeli
- Vincent Leclerc as Marcus Damnian
- Sarah Allen as Rebecca Flynt
- Kristen Hager as Nora Sargeant
- Angela Galuppo as Bridget
- Alison Louder as Emily Levison
- Terry Kinney as Heggeman
- Andreas Apergis as Ray
- Jason Spevack as Bernie
- Nathalie Breuer and Laurence Leboeuf as Celine
- Pat Kiely as Nick Finn
- Ellen David as Ilana Myers

== Episodes ==
No. overall	No. in season	Title	Directed by	Written by	Original release date	Prod. code	US viewers (millions)
1	1	"There Goes the Neighborhood (Part 1)"	Adam Kane	Jeremy Carver & Anna Fricke	January 17, 2011	137959-21	1.96
Hospital co-workers Aidan (a vampire) and Josh (a werewolf) rent a house from Danny, whose fiance Sally recently died. When the men move in, they discover Sally still lives there, as an amnesiac ghost which they can see because of their own non-human attributes. Aidan accidentally kills another co-worker, Rebecca, in the midst of passion. Bishop, a Boston police officer and the vampire that made Aidan, reveals that the police are looking to him as a suspect in Rebecca's disappearance. Josh encounters his sister Emily at the hospital, who hasn't seen him in the two years since he became a werewolf, which was shortly after she came out as a lesbian.
2	2	"There Goes the Neighborhood (Part 2)"	Adam Kane	Jeremy Carver & Anna Fricke	January 24, 2011	137959-22	2.14
Aidan prevents Josh from harming his sister after being locked in a secured room with her while turning. Sally tries without avail to contact her fiance while he attempts to repair the apartment, but learns how she died. Aidan learns Rebecca has been turned by Bishop; he attempts to convince her not to feed, like him, but is rebuffed. Rebecca attacks Josh, and later their hospital coworker Cara. Aidan and Josh both try to save Cara from bleeding to death as Rebecca boasts about the feed and tells Aidan to save her by turning her into a vampire. Not wishing to give Cara the fate without a choice, Aidan does not turn her and she subsequently dies. During the investigation of Cara's death, Bishop confronts Aidan; Aidan tells Bishop he does not want to rejoin the other vampires.
3	3	"Some Thing to Watch Over Me"	Jerry Ciccoritti	Jeremy Carver & Anna Fricke	January 31, 2011	137959-23	1.50
Aidan sets up a Neighborhood Watch to integrate himself and Josh into the neighborhood, as a vandal is tagging various buildings in the area. However, Mike Garrity (Paul Hopkins), the police officer he gets for the meeting, happens to be the son of one of his murder victims who believes that Aidan is indeed a vampire. Aidan has Tony DePaulo (Dan Jeannotte), another ghost who died in 1987, help Sally learn more about her ghostly abilities, such as leaving the house, in an attempt to get Sally to move on. But Sally only wants to be with Danny, causing Tony to go back to his one true love in life and moving on himself. Josh discovers that using the room in the hospital's basement will not suffice when he catches the vandal and nearly chokes him to death. After Garrity attacks Aidan and discovers that he is a vampire, Aidan uses his mental abilities to remove himself from the police officer's memories, but inadvertently causes him to commit suicide.
4	4	"Wouldn't It Be Nice (If We Were Human)"	Jerry Ciccoritti	Chris Dingess	February 7, 2011	137959-24	1.44
After one of his full moon transformations, Josh is caught waking up in the woods by a stranger who introduces himself as Ray and a fellow werewolf. Sally accidentally witnesses Bridget, her best friend, and Danny's blossoming new romance, which cultivated from shared grief over her death. Aidan gets into a co-dependent relationship with Rebecca, who turned up asking for his help to reject the vampire lifestyle. After Ray boosts Josh's confidence, he attempts to hit on a new nurse, Nora Sargeant, but he is rebuffed and she threatens to have him fired for sexual harassment. Later that night, Ray attacks the vampire den with Josh, and Josh brutally beats Marcus.
5	5	"The End of the World As We Knew It"	Charles Binamé	Nancy Won	February 14, 2011	137959-25	1.09
Aidan discovers that Bishop has ordered a turned priest to begin recruiting potential vampires at the hospital after one of his recently deceased patients is alive and bloodthirsty. Aidan confronts Bishop, they argue and Bishop tells Aidan about Josh and Ray having attacked vampires. While Danny has a plumber over to fix the house's plumbing, the plumber discovers Sally's engagement ring, and Sally remembers the events leading up to her death: Danny pushed her down the stairs in a rage. Close to the full moon, Josh is still upset that he almost killed a vampire and he asks Ray to leave after the night is through. Ray tries to convince him that the wolf is not a curse and that he wants to make a pack with Josh, revealing that he was the one who turned Josh two years earlier. Aidan attacks the vampire priest and removes the priest's fangs. Elsewhere, Sally uses her poltergeist-like powers to wreck Danny's apartment in revenge. Ray wakes up and Josh tells him to stay away from him. The priest learns from Bishop that his fangs won't grow back, and Danny finds his apartment wrecked and Sally's ring in the middle. Back at the house Josh makes dinner for Aidan, Sally, and himself (even though he's the only one who eats) and reveals that Ray was the one who cursed him.
6	6	"It Takes Two to Make a Thing Go Wrong"	Charles Binamé	Jeremy Carver & Anna Fricke	February 21, 2011	137959-26	1.39
Danny throws away Sally's engagement ring and it finds its way back to her, and she discovers it is an object that she can hold. Aidan is sent a DVD of Rebecca having sex with and then killing another man. Josh asks Nora out on a date, just as his sister Emily comes to him – she has broken up with her girlfriend Jackie and needs somewhere to stay. Aidan confronts Marcus and Rebecca about the DVD, but denies that he has feelings for her. Sally uses the ring to get revenge on Danny, but it only makes Danny hurt Bridget. Josh makes dinner for Nora, after getting Aidan, Sally, and Emily out of the house. At a bar, Aidan meets up with Rebecca who is there to get to him at Marcus' behest. Also at the bar, Sally meets another ghost who died from an aneurysm who uses mental poltergeist abilities to drive her ex-husband insane, but does not wish to move on, making Sally upset at how she has been treating Danny. Josh and Nora become intimate until Bridget comes by, returning Sally's ring after Danny hurt her. Rebecca continues to tempt Aidan, but Aidan resists, telling her that he has to make sure Emily gets home. Back at the house, Nora gets ready to leave for the night, but Emily comes home after she was attacked by Marcus at the bar, and the two take her to the hospital, leaving Sally in the house to tell Aidan what has happened.
7	7	"I See Your True Colors... And That's Why I Hate You"	Jeremiah Chechik	Jeremy Carver & Anna Fricke	February 28, 2011	137959-33	1.41
After Aidan realizes that Marcus is the one who attacked Emily, he tells Josh to leave town. Josh and Emily return to their family home in Ithaca, New York, where he learns that his parents separated after he left. When their father, a psychologist, comes home, he confronts Josh about his lycanthropy, which he believes is a case clinical lycanthropy. Back in Boston, Aidan confronts Bishop about Marcus' actions, but Bishop only says that it is how a werewolf would be treated after one attacks a vampire. Josh tries to explain to his father that he is not suffering from a psychosis when Aidan drops by to try to help things, only for the garlic in Josh's mother's cooking to cause his vampire attributes to surface. Marcus arrives at the house and Josh locks him out. Aidan attacks Marcus, but Marcus leaves of his own accord. Josh admits to his family the truth about being a werewolf and later talks with Aidan about revealing the truth to loved ones, deciding he will stay at home. Meanwhile, Sally tries to haunt Danny, but he taunts her, saying her tactics are not scaring him. Sally eventually gets through to Bridget, telling her that Danny killed her. Bridget confronts Danny about what Sally told her and he lies, saying that the death was an accident, causing Bridget to announce to Sally that she will no longer acknowledge her. Aidan meets with Bishop to talk about Marcus and sees several vampires meeting, telling them all that they must work to keep their weaknesses (Aidan) and mistakes (Marcus) in check to be stronger. Aidan returns to the house where Sally is upset about her failure to affect Danny, just as Josh comes in the door, having decided not to live with his family.
8	8	"Children Shouldn't Play with Undead Things"	Jeremiah Chechik	Chris Dingess	March 7, 2011	137959-27	1.46
At the hospital, Aidan shows Sally the old wing that is haunted by ghosts who have not been able to move on. Later that day, Aidan befriends a ten-year-old boy named Bernie who lives across the street from them. Nora invites Josh over to her place, but that evening Josh realizes that it is one day away from the full moon. Sally convinces him to go out, and he does until he realizes he is growling when they get intimate and he leaves. The next day, as Aidan continues to watch over Bernie, Rebecca notices them and notes that Aidan must have been a father at some point. That night, Josh prepares to lock himself up in the hospital basement until Nora confronts him. The two have sex in the hospital. While back at the house, Aidan tells Bernie to get some Three Stooges DVDs from his room. Once Josh realizes that he has very little time left until the moon rise, he rushes home and transforms in the house, with Sally watching out of curiosity. The next day, as they clean up the mess from the wolf rampaging through the house, Bernie's mother Cindy confronts Aidan as Bernie had accidentally taken the DVD of Rebecca having sex with and then killing a man, believing him to be a pedophile, even though Bernie admits he took it by mistake, and tells Aidan to never speak to Bernie again. Josh reconciles with Nora; Aidan regrets losing the one thing reminding him of his long-dead son; Sally adds a message to the wall of the old hospital wing.
9	9	"I Want You Back (From the Dead)"	Paolo Barzman	Nancy Won	March 14, 2011	137959-28	1.37
Nora and Josh grow closer until Josh has a dream that he turns into a werewolf in front of her, which leads him to decide to scale back their relationship. The next day, Aidan watches Bernie being bullied from afar, until Bernie is hit by a car. At the old wing of the hospital, Sally finds a message from Nicholas Fenn, one of her teaching assistants from college on whom she had a crush and who has died. They begin to hang out, but Nick relives his drowning death every day. Rebecca turns Bernie for Aidan, thinking it will cheer him up but Aidan knows that children should not be made into vampires. Bernie believes he has superpowers now and plans on only using them to hurt bad people, but Aidan tells him he should not hurt any humans. Later, Aidan comes across a crime scene with the bullies killed and Bishop berates him for having turned a child, despite Aidan telling him it was Rebecca who turned Bernie. Sally tries to figure out a way to help Nick and realizes that she takes her boyfriends' problems onto herself, but Nick reassures her that now he has something good to come back to after the "echo". Aidan takes Bernie to the woods to stalk a deer; he uses this excuse to stake the boy. Meanwhile, Bishop thanks Marcus for killing the two bullies so that Aidan would kill Bernie. Elsewhere, Josh tries to tell Nora he is distancing himself from loved ones due to his condition. She reveals that one of her ex-boyfriends horribly burned her, and Josh promises that he will not let that happen to her again.
10	10	"Dog Eat Dog"	Paolo Barzman	Jeremy Carver & Anna Fricke	March 21, 2011	137959-29	1.20
Coffins bearing "The Dutch", thousand-year-old vampires from the Netherlands and living in Pennsylvania Dutch country, arrive in Boston. Upon awakening, they immediately begin imposing dicta concerning actions made by Bishop and the family. This evokes flashbacks from fifty years ago during the last time The Dutch were awake, chronicling Bishop's earlier fascinations and relationship with a human woman (and of Aidan's hectoring attitude that Bishop turn her). Josh is abducted by the vampires who reveal he is to serve as entertainment for The Dutch in the form of a werewolf dog fight to the death. While imprisoned, Josh learns more about werewolves from an old man, revealed to be the other werewolf he will fight. Unable to physically help him, Sally tries to provide emotional support. Aidan attempts to interfere but the fight still takes place. Despite the other werewolf's greater size and experience, Josh is able to emerge victorious. However, the knowledge that he killed another causes Josh a lot of emotional trauma. Instead of being imprisoned and being forced to continue to fight, Josh is released which Aidan reveals was a condition of him returning to Bishop and the family. That night, Bishop confides in Aidan his fears that his command of Boston is coming to an end and that The Dutch mean to kill him.
11	11	"Going Dutch"	Érik Canuel	Chris Dingess	March 28, 2011	137959-30	1.30
Aidan and Bishop show The Dutch the blood den, where Bishop offers The Dutch each a woman to feed from, but The Dutch decide to suck all of them dry. Nora reveals she is pregnant with Josh's child; they argue because Josh appears unsure of her fidelity. At the house, Danny and Bridget visit with an exorcist, attempting to drive Sally out. The Dutch want Bishop to return with them after culling his family by two-thirds. Josh finally manages to talk with Nora, saying that he did not know if he could get anyone pregnant. Nora also agrees that she was not sure if she could get pregnant for the same real reasons. In a last-ditch effort, Sally possesses the exorcist, lashing out at Danny in the exorcist's body until he throws her against the wall, separating them. However, the exorcist has seen Sally's memories of her death and ends the ritual, saying that Danny deserves whatever Sally has in store for him. Bridget leaves Danny in the house, as an angry Sally stares at him with glassy eyes. Bishop holds a dinner for The Dutch. He reveals that he fed juniper to the women in the blood den, which causes paralysis in vampires. He beheads three of them, leaving Heggeman for last until Aidan tries to save him. He leaves the funeral home and Marcus attacks him in support of Bishop, but he is staked through the heart by Rebecca who helps Aidan and Heggeman escape. Heggeman warns Aidan that he must prepare for what is to come. Rebecca asks Aidan to kill her, as she knows the vampires will want revenge for Marcus' death. Aidan embraces her as he stakes her, putting her to rest.
12	12	"You're the One I Haunt"	Érik Canuel	Nancy Won	April 4, 2011	137959-31	1.44
Sally has still not recovered from the exorcism and is looking ghastly. At the hospital, Aidan sees his long-lost-love Celine is at the hospital. When he finds her later, she tells him that she is going to die of lung cancer. Josh finds Nora who reveals possible complications to the pregnancy. This worries Josh, but he remains steadfast in his support for her. Aidan's memories of Celine are further shown, revealing her pressuring to become a vampire and Bishop's threatening visit, leading Aidan to want to take Celine on the run. Meanwhile, Sally visits Danny, using her ghostly powers to make him hurt himself, which brings her back to normal. In an effort to eliminate Sally, Danny attempts to burn the house down, but Sally uses her ghostly abilities to trap him there until Aidan and Josh get home. Josh puts out the fire and Aidan attacks Danny, both revealing that they can see Sally and that they are not human. Aidan prepares to kill Danny at Sally's beckoning, but Josh pleads with both that Sally should not have a life on her hands. Sally acquiesces but then appears to Danny, saying that she will make his life a living hell unless he admits the arson and her murder to the police. Later, Nora has an ultrasound, and the obstetrician reveals that the baby is healthy, but Nora is fourteen weeks pregnant rather than seven. Aidan goes to Celine, offering to turn her into a vampire now but she declines. Aidan also asks her why she was not home when he went to pick her up to take her out of Montreal, but she does not reveal to him that Bishop kidnapped her, raped her, drank her blood and threatened her family. Later that night, the group toasts to Josh's future as a father, and to Sally for finally getting Danny the punishment he deserves. Sally's door to the other side appears in the living room. She is apprehensive about moving on, not sure of what will be on the other side, and is about to open it when Bishop crashes through the house's front window and stakes Aidan.
13	13	"A Funny Thing Happened on the Way to Me Killing You"	Adam Kane	Jeremy Carver & Anna Fricke	April 11, 2011	137959-32	1.67
Josh takes Aidan, who was terribly wounded by Bishop, to the basement room of the hospital for recovery. He eventually brings in Nora to help save Aidan, but refuses to tell her what happened. Aidan eventually stabilizes, but Nora tells Josh they cannot continue their relationship if he cannot bring himself to reveal his secrets. She decides however, to keep the baby. Sally, who returned home at Aidan's request, finds that her door has disappeared and that she can now interact with physical objects. Celine returns and comforts Aidan, revealing to him what Bishop did to her years ago and asking him to take her life to restore his. Reluctantly Aidan drains Celine's blood which allows him to heal rapidly. Scenes of the past are interspersed throughout, showing how Aidan met Josh two years ago when Josh was working in a restaurant and was attacked by Marcus and another vampire. Aidan gets Josh his job as an orderly at the hospital. At the hospital, Josh is accosted by Bishop, who says he wants to fight Aidan at a factory. Sally and Josh decide to protect Aidan by telling Bishop that Aidan wants to fight at the hospital basement. They plan to lock Bishop in the basement with Josh, who by then will have turned into a werewolf and will be able to kill Bishop. Josh leaves Nora a good-bye note and heads for the basement to transform. Aidan figures out what Josh is doing and has Sally lock him in the room alone and tells Bishop the fight will indeed be at the factory. However, Nora has followed Josh and enters the room to find him at the mid-point of his transformation. Josh manages to shove her out of the room and lock the door before fully turning, with Nora watching in horror and then falling to the ground in pain, the moon also affecting her pregnancy and causing her to have a miscarriage. The fully transformed Josh and Nora lock eyes underneath the doorway. Elsewhere, Aidan and Bishop brutally beat each other in the factory. Aidan ultimately beheads Bishop. Nora decides to remain with Josh despite knowing he is a werewolf. Josh tells her how he became infected by another werewolf who scratched him and killed his friend. As Josh leaves to check on his friends Nora pulls up her sleeve which shows three scratch marks. As Aidan, Sally, and Josh celebrate Bishop's demise, Aidan answers the door and is surprised to see Heggeman, who tells him that an unknown "She" wants to see him because Aidan is now the leader of Boston's vampires.
