= Robot in the Family =

- VHS cover
- Directed by: Mark Richardson; Jack Shaoul
- Written by: Jack Shaoul
- Produced by: Mark Richardson; Jack Shaoul
- Starring: Joe Pantoliano; John Rhys-Davies; Danny Gerard; Amy Wright
- Release date: March 2, 1994
- Running time: 85 minutes
- Country: United States
- Language: English

Robot in the Family (also known as Golddigger) is a 1994 American comedy film produced and directed by Mark Richardson and Jack Shaoul. It was written by Shaoul and stars Joe Pantoliano, John Rhys-Davies, Danny Gerard, and Amy Wright.

== Cast ==
- Joe Pantoliano as Jack Shamir
- John Rhys-Davies as Eli Taki / Rashmud / Sashri
- Danny Gerard as Alex Shamir
- Amy Wright as Kristina Shamir
- Howard Scott Nicoll, Derrick McQueen, Patrick Shanley, and Ari Taub as Golddigger
  - Don Peoples as the voice of Golddigger
- Peter Maloney as Dr. Clayhand
- Matthew Locricchio as Clyde Baldino
- David Shuman as Bono Baldino
- Jack Shaoul as Isaac Shamir / Blind Man
- Tom Signorelli as Detective Goober
- Barton Heyman as Mr. Marshall
- Jane Connell as Mrs. Miller

== Release ==
Robot in the Family was distributed on home video in March 1994.

== Reception ==
In their review of Robot in the Family, critics Mick Martin and Marsha Porter wrote: "This cheap, sophomoric comedy about an ambulatory robot is one of the worst films we've ever seen".
