= Danny Gerard =

American actor and musician (born 1977)

- Born: Daniel Gerard Lanzetta; May 29, 1977 (age 49); Mount Vernon, New York, United States
- Occupations: Actor and musician
- Years active: 1986–2000

Danny Gerard (born Daniel Gerard Lanzetta; May 29, 1977) is an American actor and musician. He is best known for his role as Alan Silver in the CBS television series Brooklyn Bridge. He also starred in the short lived CBS series Blue Skies and the unaired NBC pilot News at Twelve.

== Early life ==
Gerard was born in Mount Vernon, New York and is of Italian descent.

== Career ==
He was in the original Broadway production of Lost in Yonkers starring alongside Kevin Spacey, Mercedes Ruehl and Irene Worth. He played the role of Arty, in this Tony award-winning production. In 1997, he starred as the voice of the titular character in the animated film adaptation of Jack London's White Fang.

Gerard was in the original cast of the musical Falsettoland, playing the role of Jason. He can be heard on the second disc of the two-CD set of "March of the Falsettos" and Falsettoland. He released a CD, The Story of a Minute in America in 2005.

Going by his real name Danny Lanzetta, he has also written several books and is a spoken word artist.

== Filmography ==
=== Film ===
Year	Title	Role	Notes
1988	Starlight: A Musical Movie	Benny	
1990	Desperate Hours	Zack Cornell	
1993	Robot in the Family	Alex Shamir	
1997	Academy Boyz	Peter Herns	
2000	Looking for an Echo	Young Pooch	

=== Television ===
Year	Title	Role	Notes
1986	Rage of Angels: The Story Continues	Joshua Parker	Television film
1987	Kate & Allie	—N/a	Episode: "Dearly Beloved"
1988	Drop-Out Mother	Sam Cromwell	Television film
1989	Monsters	Marty	Episode: "Satan in the Suburbs"
1991	HBO Storybook Musicals	Ira	Episode: "Ira Sleeps Over"
1991	CBS All American Thanksgiving Day Parade	—N/a	Television special
1991–1993	Brooklyn Bridge	Alan Silver	33 episodes
1994	Law & Order	Billy Wojak	Episode: "Kids"
2011	Law & Order: SVU	Glenn	Episode: "Bombshell"
