= Matthew Louis Siegel =

American business executive and child actor

- Born: United States
- Education: Harvard University, Columbia University
- Occupations: Business executive, actor
- Awards: Billboard 30 Under 30

Matthew Louis Siegel is an American business executive.

Siegel is a Harvard University graduate and Columbia University's School of Public and International Affairs. Siegel was formerly the chief marketing officer and Head of Global Client Group of Aperture Investors. Siegel was previously the Chief Digital Officer of Roc Nation. He was formerly the CEO and Founder of Indaba Media, a music technology company based in Manhattan which was acquired by Splice.
