= Amy Aquino =

American actress (born 1957)

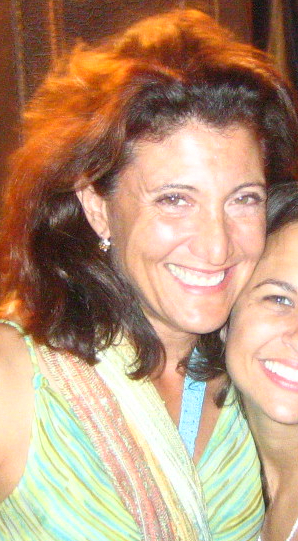
- Aquino at a wedding reception in the Brooklyn neighborhood of Carroll Gardens, 2006
- Born: March 20, 1957 (age 69); Teaneck, New Jersey, U.S.
- Education: Harvard University (Bachelor of Science); Yale University (Master of Fine Arts)
- Occupation: Actress
- Years active: 1982–present
- Spouse: Drew McCoy (m. 1995)

Amy Aquino McCoy (born March 20, 1957) is an American television, film, and stage actress. She has appeared in television series such as Brooklyn Bridge, ER, and Being Human, and was nominated for a Screen Actors Guild Award for her role in Picket Fences. She was co-secretary/treasurer of the SAG-AFTRA until August 2015 and starred in the television series Bosch as Lt. Grace Billets.

== Early life and education ==
Aquino was born in Teaneck, New Jersey. As of the late 1980s, her parents, Adele Frances Mesiti Aquino and Salvatore Aquino, lived in Carolina Beach, North Carolina, acting in bit and extra roles for production shot in the nearby town of Wilmington, such as From the Hip (1987), Date with an Angel (1987) and Windmills of the Gods (1988). She first acted in junior high school productions. At Harvard University, she majored in biology. In her final year, she realized she was spending more time acting than studying and so left to travel to New York to take acting classes, while working at a law firm. She stayed there for three years without landing any acting jobs, then traveled to Minneapolis, where she gained her first roles. In 1986, after two years of rejections, she enrolled at Yale University School of Drama, where she studied three years.

== Career ==
=== Acting ===
After Yale, Aquino spent the next five years based in New York. While there she appeared with Kevin Spacey at Playwrights Horizons and joined the Circle Repertory Company. She appeared in Wendy Wasserstein's The Heidi Chronicles, which won the Tony Award for Best Play in 1989. Also that year, Aquino appeared in Moonstruck (as Loretta's hairdresser) and Working Girl (as Melanie Griffith's secretary at the end of the film), her first film roles.

In 1991, she was cast as one of the leads in the series Brooklyn Bridge. After the show was renewed for a second season, Aquino moved to California. She primarily has been in television roles, including ER, The Larry Sanders Show, and Everybody Loves Raymond.

In 1995, Aquino was nominated for a Screen Actors Guild Award for portraying Dr. Joanna "Joey" Diamond in Picket Fences.

In 2005, she appeared in Wasserstein's Third in an off-Broadway production at the Lincoln Center for the Performing Arts. Aquino also appeared off-Broadway at the 59E59 Theaters in Secrets of the Trade by Jonathan Tolins.

In 2013, Aquino was cast as the witch Donna in the season 2 of Being Human. Later this year, Aquino was cast in the pilot Divorce: A Love Story; however, the role was recast when the producers decided that she looked too young to play the mother of Jason Jones, who was portrayed by an actor 16 years younger than she was. Aquino played college President Dalley in The Lazarus Effect (2015), co-starring Sarah Bolger, Mark Duplass, and Olivia Wilde.

Aquino starred in Amazon Studios' television series Bosch as Lieutenant Grace Billets. The series was renewed for a seventh and final season on February 13, 2020.

=== SAG and SAG-AFTRA ===
She joined the Screen Actors Guild in 1987 and was named the co-secretary-treasurer on September 24, 2009. She was elected for a second term in 2011, without opposition, and after being elected the first secretary-treasurer of the newly merged SAG-AFTRA served until August 2015. She had previously served two terms as first vice president of the Screen Actors Guild.

== Personal life ==
Aquino met Drew McCoy after moving to California. In 1995, they were married at Saint Malachy's Roman Catholic Church in Manhattan. Together they purchased the Villa Royale, an inn in Palm Springs, California, which they renovated over a two-year period.
