= Jeremy Carver =

American television writer and producer

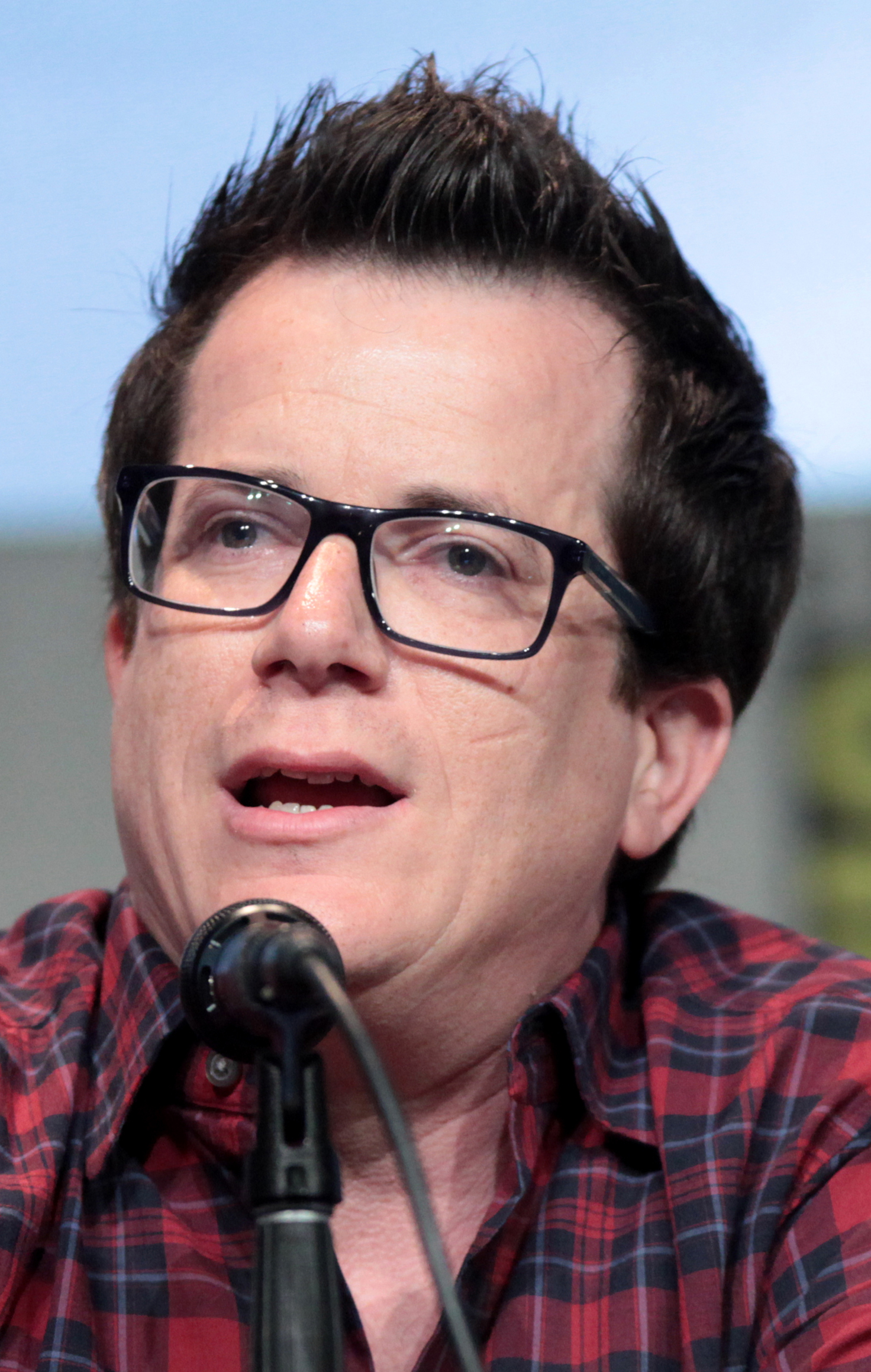
- Born: United States
- Occupations: Television writer, television producer
- Years active: 2004–present
- Spouse: Anna Fricke

Jeremy Carver is an American television writer and producer. He developed the series Being Human, Frequency, and Doom Patrol. Carver was also a writer and producer on the series Supernatural, serving as showrunner during seasons eight through eleven.

== Personal life ==
Carver is married to fellow television producer and writer Anna Fricke. They worked as co-developers of Being Human from 2011 to 2014.

== Career ==
Carver's career began in 2004 when he served as a consulting writer on the failed television pilot Fearless, based on the series of novels by Francine Pascal. In 2006, he wrote an episode of the CBS series Waterfront, but the series was cancelled before its premiere and Carver's episode never aired.

In 2007, Carver began work on Supernatural as a writer and story editor. He contributed twelve scripts and became a co-producer during the show's fifth season. The Supernatural character Chuck Shurley's pen name, "Carver Edlund" was named partially after Carver. He left after three years to work on SyFy's Being Human. Carver returned to Supernatural in 2012 as showrunner.

In 2016, Carver left Supernatural to launch his new show Frequency, based on the 2000 film by the same name. Frequency ran from 2016 to 2017.

In 2018, Carver was approached by DC Universe producers Greg Berlanti, Sarah Schechter and Geoff Johns to develop the series Doom Patrol. It aired its first season in 2019. Carver served as showrunner and executive producer for the show.

In January 2023, Carver joined Christal Henry as a writer on the upcoming Peacemaker spin-off series, Waller, set in the DC Universe.

== Writing credits ==
=== Supernatural ===
- "Sin City" (October 25, 2007)
- "A Very Supernatural Christmas" (December 13, 2007)
- "Mystery Spot" (February 14, 2008)
- "Long Distance Call" (May 1, 2008)
- "In the Beginning" (October 2, 2008)
- "Family Remains" (January 15, 2009)
- "Death Takes a Holiday" (March 12, 2009)
- "The Rapture" (April 30, 2009)
- "Free to Be You and Me" (September 24, 2009)
- "Changing Channels" (November 5, 2009)
- "Dead Men Don't Wear Plaid" (March 25, 2010)
- "Point of No Return" (April 15, 2010)
- "We Need to Talk About Kevin" (October 3, 2012)
- "Sacrifice" (May 15, 2013)
- "I Think I'm Gonna Like It Here" (October 8, 2013)
- "Do You Believe in Miracles?" (May 20, 2014)
- "Black" (October 7, 2014)
- "Brother's Keeper" (May 20, 2015)
- "Out of the Darkness, Into the Fire" (October 7, 2015)

=== Being Human ===
- "There Goes the Neighborhood (Part 1)" (January 17, 2011)
- "There Goes the Neighborhood (Part 2)" (January 24, 2011)
- "Some Thing to Watch Over Me" (January 31, 2011)
- "It Takes Two to Make a Thing Go Wrong" (February 21, 2011)
- "I See Your True Colors... And That's Why I Hate You" (February 28, 2011)
- "Dog Eat Dog" (March 21, 2011)
- "A Funny Thing Happened on the Way to Me Killing You" (April 11, 2011)
- "Turn This Mother Out" (January 16, 2012)
- "Mama Said There'd Be Decades Like These" (February 20, 2012)
- "It's My Party and I'll Die If I Want To" (April 9, 2012)
- "It's a Shame About Ray" (January 14, 2013)

=== Frequency ===
- "Pilot" (October 5, 2016)
- "Signal and Noise" (October 12, 2016)
- "Signal Loss" (January 25, 2017)

=== Doom Patrol ===
- "Pilot" (February 15, 2019)
- "Ezekiel Patrol" (May 24, 2019)
- "Fun Size Patrol" (June 25, 2020)
- "Dead Patrol" (September 23, 2021)

=== Prodigal Son ===
- " The Trip" (October 21, 2019)

== Filmography ==
=== Television ===
The parenthetic numbers in writing credits refer to the number of episodes written.

Title	Year(s)	Credited as			Notes
Title	Year(s)	Creator	Writer	Executive producer	Notes
Fearless	2004	Yes	Yes	Yes	Unaired pilot
Waterfront	2006	No	Yes (1)	No	Series canceled before airing
Supernatural	2007–10; 2012–18	No	Yes (19)	Yes	Story editor (season 3); Executive story editor (season 4) co-producer (season 5); Showrunner (seasons 8–11); Executive producer (seasons 8–13)
Being Human	2011–14	Developer	Yes (11)	Yes	Executive producer (seasons 1–3)
Frequency	2016–17	Developer	Yes (3)	Yes	
Doom Patrol	2019–23	Developer	Yes (4)	Yes	
Prodigal Son	2019	No	Yes (1)	No	Consulting producer (season 1: 4 episodes)
Dead Boy Detectives	2024	No	No	Yes	
