= Alison Louder =

Canadian actress

- Occupation(s): Actress, producer

Alison Louder is a Canadian actress. She is known for her roles as Sister Amy on Helix and Emily Levison on Being Human, both for SyFy. She was voted #3 Best Local Actress in Cult Montreal's 2014 Best of Montreal poll.

== Career ==
On-screen, Louder is best known for her work on the SyFy Network. She guest-starred as fan-favourite Sister Amy on season two of Helix (SyFy and Sony Pictures) and held a recurring role on the series Being Human (SyFy and Muse Entertainment) as Emily Levison.

== Honours ==
- 2014 #3 Best Local Actress - Best of Montreal
- 2013 #4 Best Local Actress - Best of Montreal
- 2008-2009 MECCA Awards Dracula, Fallen Angel Productions: Best Production (nominated), Best Director (nominated), Best Ensemble (nominated)
- 2010 Frankie Awards, Hot Pink, Next Stage Award runner-up

== Filmography ==
=== Movies ===
Year	Title	Role	Notes
2014	Elephant Song	Nurse	
2012	Something More Than Nothing	Francophone Cashier	Short
2012-11	Open	Lucy	Short
2012	On the Road	Dorie	
2012	You Are Driving Me Crazy	Terrified woman	
2011	Another Silence	Kate	
2010	Never Even	Stephanie Carol	Short
2009	Crawler	Laura	
2008	The Mummy: Tomb of the Dragon Emperor	Woman in Bookstore	
2007	Rise of the Ghosts	Veronica	
2000	Cul de Sac	Fanny	Short

=== TV movies ===
Year	Title	Role
2013	JFK: The Smoking Gun	Nurse
2010	Second Chances	Karen
2009	Fakers	Cashier
2008	You Belong to Me	Ellen Dionne
2015	Saving Hope	Illyana Sokic

=== TV shows ===
Year	Title	Role	Episodes
2022	Murdoch Mysteries	Lucy Maude Montgomery	"The Write Stuff" (S16E03)
2019	Suits	Susan	Recurring, seasons 8-9
2016	Murdoch Mysteries	Lucy Maude Montgomery	"Unlucky In Love" (S09E12)
2015	Helix	Sister Amy	"M. Domestica" (2015); "Oubliette" (2015); "Densho" (2015); "Scion" (2015); "Reunion" (2015); "San Jose" (2015)
2014	Fatal Vows	Kelly	
2011–2014	Being Human	Emily Levinson	"House Hunting" (2014); "Pack It Up, Pack It In" (2014); "Always a Bridesmaid, Never Alive" (2013); "If I Only Had Raw Brain" (2013); "One Is Silver and the Other Pagan" (2013); "It's My Party and I'll Die If I Want To" (2012); "I've Got You Under Your Skin" (2012); "I See Your True Colors and That's Why I Hate You" (2011); "It Takes Two to Make a Thing Go Wrong" (2011)
2010	Blue Mountain State	Skye	"LAX" (2010)
2007	Casino 2	Jeune Fille	1 episode

=== Theatre ===
Year	Title	Role	Production company, venue	Notes
2010	Hot Pink	Lindy/writer/producer	Random Thread Prod., Portuguese Association	One woman show
2009	Speak Truth To Power	AD/Producer	Scotch & Cookies Theatre, St George's Church	
2008	Dracula	Mina	Fallen Angel Productions, Monument National	
2008	The Elusive	Beth	Tableau d’Hôte Theatre, Geordie Theatre	
2008	The Cyclops	Jessie the Bearded Lady	Rabbit In A Hat Prod., Centaur Theatre	Musical play
2007	KITH by Kids in the Hall	Guest comedian	Just For Laughs, Théatre Maisonneuve	
2007	As You Like It	Corin & Audrey	Pumpkin Theatre, MainLine Theatre	
2007	Heaven	Sissy	Fallen Angel Productions, MainLine Theatre	
2006	Peccadilloes	Various characters	Whipp Productions, Theatre Sainte Catherine	
2005	Miss Sugarpuss and the Burly-Q Revue	Tiny Tease - Miss Sugarpuss	Main Hall	
2005	Into the Woods	Little Red Riding Hood	One Foot Productions, Moyse Hall	Musical play
2004	Sarah with an H	Chorus	WongTong Productions, Théâtre d'Aujourd'hui	Musical play

=== Voice and animation ===
Year	Title	Role
2011	Deus Ex: Human Revolution	Nina Sullivan
2010	Flushing Lacan	Jodie
2009	Wii Ware: Midnight Bowling	Host
2008–2012	Upstage on CKUT 90.3FM	Contributor/Host (Radio program)
2007	GeneFusion	Caley
