= List of Walker episodes =

The following is an episode list for the American action crime drama television series Walker developed by Anna Fricke which aired on The CW.

During the course of the series, 69 episodes of Walker aired over four seasons, between January 21, 2021, and June 26, 2024.

== Series overview ==
| Season | Episodes | Originally released | |
| Season | Episodes | First released | Last released |
|---|---|---|---|
| 1 | 18 | January 21, 2021 | August 12, 2021 |
| 2 | 20 | October 28, 2021 | June 23, 2022 |
| 3 | 18 | October 6, 2022 | May 11, 2023 |
| 4 | 13 | April 3, 2024 | June 26, 2024 |

== Episodes ==
=== Season 1 (2021) ===
| No. overall | No. in season | Title | Directed by | Written by | Original release date | U.S. viewers (millions) |
|---|---|---|---|---|---|---|
| 1 | 1 | "Pilot" | Jessica Yu | Anna Fricke | January 21, 2021 | 2.44 |
| 2 | 2 | "Back in the Saddle" | Steve Robin | Anna Fricke | January 28, 2021 | 2.11 |
| 3 | 3 | "Bobble Head" | Randy Zisk | Seamus Kevin Fahey | February 4, 2021 | 1.86 |
| 4 | 4 | "Don't Fence Me In" | John T. Kretchmer | April Fitzsimmons | February 11, 2021 | 1.73 |
| 5 | 5 | "Duke" | Steve Robin | Bret VandenBos & Brandon Willer | February 18, 2021 | 1.68 |
| 6 | 6 | "Bar None" | Amyn Kaderali | Casey Fisher & Paula Sabbaga | March 11, 2021 | 1.33 |
| 7 | 7 | "Tracks" | Bola Ogun | Casey Fisher & Paula Sabbaga | March 18, 2021 | 1.45 |
| 8 | 8 | "Fine Is a Four Letter Word" | Stacey K. Black | Katherine Alyse | April 8, 2021 | 1.03 |
| 9 | 9 | "Rule Number 17" | Steve Robin | Bret VandenBos & Brandon Willer | April 15, 2021 | 1.14 |
| 10 | 10 | "Encore" | Stacey K. Black | Blythe Ann Johnson | May 6, 2021 | 0.98 |
| 11 | 11 | "Freedom" | Alex Pillai | Geri Carillo | May 13, 2021 | 0.90 |
| 12 | 12 | "A Tale of Two Families" | Steve Robin | Teleplay by : Seamus Kevin Fahey & Anna Fricke; Story by : Seamus Kevin Fahey | May 20, 2021 | 1.00 |
| 13 | 13 | "Defend the Ranch" | Alex Pillai | Teleplay by : Seamus Kevin Fahey & Anna Fricke; Story by : Seamus Kevin Fahey | June 10, 2021 | 1.03 |
| 14 | 14 | "Mehar's Jacket" | Diana Valentine | Casey Fisher | June 17, 2021 | 0.99 |
| 15 | 15 | "Four Stones in Hand" | Tessa Blake | Paula Sabbaga | June 24, 2021 | 1.08 |
| 16 | 16 | "Bad Apples" | Joel Novoa | Aaron Carew | July 15, 2021 | 0.96 |
| 17 | 17 | "Dig" | Richard Speight Jr. | Seamus Kevin Fahey & Anna Fricke | July 22, 2021 | 1.15 |
| 18 | 18 | "Drive" | Steve Robin | Seamus Kevin Fahey & Anna Fricke | August 12, 2021 | 1.10 |

=== Season 2 (2021–22) ===
| No. overall | No. in season | Title | Directed by | Written by | Original release date | U.S. viewers (millions) |
|---|---|---|---|---|---|---|
| 19 | 1 | "They Started It" | Steve Robin | Seamus Kevin Fahey & Anna Fricke | October 28, 2021 | 0.95 |
| 20 | 2 | "The One Who Got Away" | Richard Speight Jr. | Seamus Kevin Fahey & Anna Fricke | November 4, 2021 | 1.02 |
| 21 | 3 | "Barn Burner" | Joel Novoa | Aaron Carew and Blythe Ann Johnson | November 11, 2021 | 0.87 |
| 22 | 4 | "It's Not What You Think" | Jackeline Tejada | Casey Fisher | November 18, 2021 | 0.85 |
| 23 | 5 | "Partners and Third Wheels" | Aprill Winney | Geri Carillo | December 2, 2021 | 0.93 |
| 24 | 6 | "Douglas Fir" | Steve Robin | Bret VandenBos & Brandon Willer | December 9, 2021 | 0.98 |
| 25 | 7 | "Where Do We Go From Here?" | Amyn Kaderali | Anna Fricke & Katherine Alyse | January 13, 2022 | 0.99 |
| 26 | 8 | "Two Points for Honesty" | Bosede Williams | Blythe Ann Johnson | January 20, 2022 | 1.09 |
| 27 | 9 | "Sucker Punch" | Amyn Kaderali | Aaron Carew | January 27, 2022 | 1.04 |
| 28 | 10 | "Nudge" | Steve Robin | Seamus Kevin Fahey & Casey Fisher | March 3, 2022 | 0.90 |
| 29 | 11 | "Boundaries" | David McWhirter | Geri Carillo | March 10, 2022 | 0.85 |
| 30 | 12 | "Common Ground" | Charissa Sanjarernsuithikul | Maya Vyas | March 31, 2022 | 0.96 |
| 31 | 13 | "One Good Thing" | Ben Hernandez Bray | Bret VandenBos & Brandon Willer | April 7, 2022 | 0.91 |
| 32 | 14 | "No Such Thing As Fair Play" | Jensen Ackles | Katherine Alyse | April 14, 2022 | 0.85 |
| 33 | 15 | "Bygones" | Philip Hardage | David James | April 28, 2022 | 0.70 |
| 34 | 16 | "Champagne Problems" | Kelli Williams | Casey Fisher & Blythe Ann Johnson | May 5, 2022 | 0.67 |
| 35 | 17 | "Torn" | America Young | Aaron Carew | June 2, 2022 | 0.87 |
| 36 | 18 | "Search and Rescue" | Austin Nichols | Teleplay by : Bret VandenBos & Brandon Willer; Story by : Seamus Kevin Fahey & Bret VandenBos & Brandon Willer | June 9, 2022 | 0.90 |
| 37 | 19 | "A Matter of Miles" | Tessa Blake | Aaron Carew & Anna Fricke | June 16, 2022 | 0.88 |
| 38 | 20 | "Something's Missing" | Steve Robin | Seamus Kevin Fahey & Anna Fricke | June 23, 2022 | 0.84 |

=== Season 3 (2022–23) ===
| No. overall | No. in season | Title | Directed by | Written by | Original release date | U.S. viewers (millions) |
|---|---|---|---|---|---|---|
| 39 | 1 | "World on a String" | Steve Robin | Teleplay by : Anna Fricke; Story by : Seamus Kevin Fahey & Anna Fricke | October 6, 2022 | 0.76 |
| 40 | 2 | "Sittin' on a Rainbow" | Austin Nichols | Aaron Carew | October 13, 2022 | 0.67 |
| 41 | 3 | "Rubber Meets the Road" | April Winney | Bret VandenBos & Brandon Willer | October 20, 2022 | 0.69 |
| 42 | 4 | "Wild Horses Couldn't Drag Me Away" | Chad Dashnaw | Russel Friend | October 27, 2022 | 0.80 |
| 43 | 5 | "Mum's the Word" | Stephanie Martin | Blythe Ann Johnson | November 3, 2022 | 0.74 |
| 44 | 6 | "Something There That Wasn't There Before" | Peter B. Kowalski | Geri Carillo & Casey Fisher | November 10, 2022 | 0.77 |
| 45 | 7 | "Just Desserts" | Steve Robin | Anna Fricke & Bret VandenBos & Brandon Willer | November 17, 2022 | 0.80 |
| 46 | 8 | "Cry Uncle" | America Young | Aaron Carew | January 12, 2023 | 0.74 |
| 47 | 9 | "Buffering" | Lauren Petzke | Maya Vyas | January 19, 2023 | 0.76 |
| 48 | 10 | "Blinded by the Light" | Kevin Berlandi | Russel Friend | January 26, 2023 | 0.76 |
| 49 | 11 | "Past Is Prologue" | Clara Aranovich | Blythe Ann Johnson | February 16, 2023 | 0.82 |
| 50 | 12 | "Best Laid Plans" | Paul Hunziker | Geri Carillo | February 23, 2023 | 0.67 |
| 51 | 13 | "The Deserters" | Steve Robin | Casey Fisher | March 2, 2023 | 0.62 |
| 52 | 14 | "False Flag" | Richard Speight, Jr. | David James | March 23, 2023 | 0.67 |
| 53 | 15 | "False Flag" | David McWhirter | Bret VandenBos & Brandon Wille | March 30, 2023 | 0.60 |
| 54 | 16 | "Daddy Was a Bank Robber" | Amyn Kaderali | Eddy Hewitt Jr. | April 27, 2023 | 0.54 |
| 55 | 17 | "It Writes Itself" | Joel Novoa | Aaron Carew | May 4, 2023 | 0.51 |
| 56 | 18 | "It's a Nice Day for a Ranger Wedding" | Steve Robin | Anna Fricke & Russel Friend | May 11, 2023 | 0.50 |

=== Season 4 (2024) ===
| No. overall | No. in season | Title | Directed by | Written by | Original release date | U.S. viewers (millions) |
|---|---|---|---|---|---|---|
| 57 | 1 | "The Quiet" | Steve Robin | Bret VandenBos & Brandon Willer | April 3, 2024 | 0.49 |
| 58 | 2 | "Maybe It's Maybelline" | Steve Robin | Aaron Carew | April 10, 2024 | 0.60 |
| 59 | 3 | "Lessons from the Gift Shop" | Ben Hernandez Bray | Blythe Ann Johnson | April 17, 2024 | 0.51 |
| 60 | 4 | "Insane B.S. and Bloodshed" | Ben Hernandez Bray | Casey Fisher | April 24, 2024 | 0.55 |
| 61 | 5 | "We've Been Here Before" | Bola Ogun | Geri Carillo | May 1, 2024 | 0.46 |
| 62 | 6 | "We All Fall Down" | Bola Ogun | Bret VandenBos & Brandon Willer | May 8, 2024 | 0.38 |
| 63 | 7 | "Hold Me Now" | Stephanie Martin | Casey Fisher & Russel Friend | May 15, 2024 | 0.48 |
| 64 | 8 | "Witt's End" | Stephanie Martin | Aaron Carew | May 22, 2024 | 0.36 |
| 65 | 9 | "A History of Horrors and Other Tales" | Phil Hardage | Blythe Ann Johnson | May 29, 2024 | 0.57 |
| 66 | 10 | "End This Way" | Chad Dashnaw | David James | June 5, 2024 | 0.56 |
| 67 | 11 | "Let's Go, Let's Go" | Anna Fricke | Anna Fricke | June 12, 2024 | 0.50 |
| 68 | 12 | "Letting Go" | Steve Robin | Casey Fisher & Russel Friend | June 19, 2024 | 0.56 |
| 69 | 13 | "See You Sometime" | Steve Robin | Anna Fricke & Blythe Ann Johnson | June 26, 2024 | 0.55 |

== Ratings ==
=== Season 1 ===
Viewership and ratings per episode of List of Walker episodes
| No. | Title | Air date | Rating (18–49) | Viewers (millions) | DVR (18–49) | DVR viewers (millions) | Total (18–49) | Total viewers (millions) |
|---|---|---|---|---|---|---|---|---|
| 1 | "Pilot" | January 21, 2021 | 0.4 | 2.44 | 0.3 | 1.27 | 0.7 | 3.71 |
| 2 | "Back in the Saddle" | January 28, 2021 | 0.3 | 2.11 | —N/a | —N/a | —N/a | —N/a |
| 3 | "Bobble Head" | February 4, 2021 | 0.3 | 1.86 | —N/a | —N/a | —N/a | —N/a |
| 4 | "Don't Fence Me In" | February 11, 2021 | 0.2 | 1.73 | 0.3 | 1.18 | 0.5 | 2.91 |
| 5 | "Duke" | February 18, 2021 | 0.2 | 1.68 | 0.3 | 1.15 | 0.5 | 2.82 |
| 6 | "Bar None" | March 11, 2021 | 0.3 | 1.33 | 0.3 | 1.09 | 0.6 | 2.43 |
| 7 | "Tracks" | March 18, 2021 | 0.3 | 1.45 | —N/a | —N/a | —N/a | —N/a |
| 8 | "Fine is a Four Letter Word" | April 8, 2021 | 0.2 | 1.03 | 0.3 | 1.08 | 0.5 | 2.11 |
| 9 | "Time. Place. Collateral." | April 15, 2021 | 0.2 | 1.14 | —N/a | —N/a | —N/a | —N/a |
| 10 | "Encore" | May 6, 2021 | 0.1 | 0.98 | 0.2 | 0.86 | 0.3 | 1.84 |
| 11 | "Freedom" | May 13, 2021 | 0.1 | 0.90 | 0.2 | 0.88 | 0.3 | 1.78 |
| 12 | "A Tale of Two Families" | May 20, 2021 | 0.2 | 1.00 | 0.2 | 0.82 | 0.4 | 1.82 |
| 13 | "Defend the Ranch" | June 10, 2021 | 0.2 | 1.03 | 0.2 | 0.84 | 0.4 | 1.86 |
| 14 | "Mehar's Jacket" | June 17, 2021 | 0.1 | 0.99 | 0.2 | 0.80 | 0.3 | 1.78 |
| 15 | "Four Stones in Hand" | June 24, 2021 | 0.2 | 1.08 | 0.2 | 0.84 | 0.4 | 1.93 |
| 16 | "Bad Apples" | July 15, 2021 | 0.1 | 0.96 | 0.1 | 0.74 | 0.3 | 1.71 |
| 17 | "Dig" | July 22, 2021 | 0.2 | 1.15 | 0.2 | 0.84 | 0.3 | 1.98 |
| 18 | "Drive" | August 12, 2021 | 0.1 | 1.10 | 0.1 | 0.76 | 0.3 | 1.86 |

=== Season 2 ===
Viewership and ratings per episode of List of Walker episodes
| No. | Title | Air date | Rating (18–49) | Viewers (millions) | DVR (18–49) | DVR viewers (millions) | Total (18–49) | Total viewers (millions) |
|---|---|---|---|---|---|---|---|---|
| 1 | "They Started It" | October 28, 2021 | 0.1 | 0.95 | —N/a | —N/a | —N/a | —N/a |
| 2 | "The One Who Got Away" | November 4, 2021 | 0.1 | 1.02 | —N/a | —N/a | —N/a | —N/a |
| 3 | "Barn Burner" | November 11, 2021 | 0.1 | 0.87 | —N/a | —N/a | —N/a | —N/a |
| 4 | "It's Not What You Think" | November 18, 2021 | 0.1 | 0.85 | 0.1 | 0.80 | 0.2 | 1.65 |
| 5 | "Partners and Third Wheels" | December 2, 2021 | 0.1 | 0.93 | 0.1 | 0.87 | 0.3 | 1.80 |
| 6 | "Douglas Fir" | December 9, 2021 | 0.2 | 0.98 | 0.1 | 0.71 | 0.3 | 1.69 |
| 7 | "Where Do We Go From Here" | January 13, 2022 | 0.1 | 0.99 | —N/a | —N/a | —N/a | —N/a |
| 8 | "Two Points for Honesty" | January 20, 2022 | 0.1 | 1.09 | —N/a | —N/a | —N/a | —N/a |
| 9 | "Sucker Punch" | January 27, 2022 | 0.1 | 1.04 | —N/a | —N/a | —N/a | —N/a |
| 10 | "Nudge" | March 3, 2022 | 0.1 | 0.90 | —N/a | —N/a | —N/a | —N/a |
| 11 | "Boundaries" | March 10, 2022 | 0.1 | 0.85 | 0.1 | 0.76 | 0.2 | 1.61 |
| 12 | "Common Ground" | March 31, 2022 | 0.1 | 0.96 | 0.1 | 0.64 | 0.2 | 1.60 |
| 13 | "One Good Thing" | April 7, 2022 | 0.1 | 0.91 | 0.1 | 0.71 | 0.2 | 1.61 |
| 14 | "No Such Thing As Fair Play" | April 14, 2022 | 0.1 | 0.85 | 0.1 | 0.70 | 0.2 | 1.56 |
| 15 | "Bygones" | April 28, 2022 | 0.1 | 0.70 | —N/a | —N/a | —N/a | —N/a |
| 16 | "Champagne Problems" | May 5, 2022 | 0.1 | 0.67 | —N/a | —N/a | —N/a | —N/a |
| 17 | "Torn" | June 2, 2022 | 0.1 | 0.87 | —N/a | —N/a | —N/a | —N/a |
| 18 | "Search and Rescue" | June 9, 2022 | 0.1 | 0.90 | —N/a | —N/a | —N/a | —N/a |
| 19 | "A Matter of Miles" | June 16, 2022 | 0.1 | 0.88 | —N/a | —N/a | —N/a | —N/a |
| 20 | "Something's Missing" | June 23, 2022 | 0.1 | 0.84 | —N/a | —N/a | —N/a | —N/a |

=== Season 3 ===
Viewership and ratings per episode of List of Walker episodes
| No. | Title | Air date | Rating (18–49) | Viewers (millions) | DVR (18–49) | DVR viewers (millions) | Total (18–49) | Total viewers (millions) |
|---|---|---|---|---|---|---|---|---|
| 1 | "World on a String" | October 6, 2022 | 0.1 | 0.76 | 0.1 | 0.63 | 0.1 | 1.39 |
| 2 | "Sittin' on a Rainbow" | October 13, 2022 | 0.1 | 0.67 | 0.1 | 0.61 | 0.1 | 1.28 |
| 3 | "Rubber Meets the Road" | October 20, 2022 | 0.1 | 0.69 | 0.1 | 0.67 | 0.2 | 1.36 |
| 4 | "Wild Horses Couldn't Drag Me Away" | October 27, 2022 | 0.1 | 0.80 | 0.1 | 0.62 | 0.1 | 1.42 |
| 5 | "Mum's the Word" | November 3, 2022 | 0.1 | 0.74 | 0.1 | 0.68 | 0.2 | 1.43 |
| 6 | "Something There That Wasn't There Before" | November 10, 2022 | 0.1 | 0.77 | 0.1 | 0.60 | 0.2 | 1.37 |
| 7 | "Just Desserts" | November 17, 2022 | 0.1 | 0.80 | 0.1 | 0.57 | 0.2 | 1.37 |
| 8 | "Cry Uncle" | January 12, 2023 | 0.1 | 0.74 | 0.1 | 0.53 | 0.2 | 1.27 |
| 9 | "Buffering" | January 19, 2023 | 0.1 | 0.76 | 0.1 | 0.47 | 0.2 | 1.23 |
| 10 | "Blinded by the Light" | January 26, 2023 | 0.1 | 0.76 | —N/a | —N/a | —N/a | —N/a |
| 11 | "Past Is Prologue" | February 16, 2023 | 0.1 | 0.82 | —N/a | —N/a | —N/a | —N/a |
| 12 | "Best Laid Plans" | February 23, 2023 | 0.1 | 0.67 | —N/a | —N/a | —N/a | —N/a |
| 13 | "The Deserters" | March 2, 2023 | 0.1 | 0.62 | —N/a | —N/a | —N/a | —N/a |
| 14 | "False Flag Part One" | March 23, 2023 | 0.1 | 0.67 | —N/a | —N/a | —N/a | —N/a |
| 15 | "False Flag Part Two" | March 30, 2023 | 0.1 | 0.60 | —N/a | —N/a | —N/a | —N/a |
| 16 | "Daddy Was a Bank Robber" | April 27, 2023 | 0.1 | 0.54 | —N/a | —N/a | —N/a | —N/a |
| 17 | "It Writes Itself" | May 4, 2023 | 0.1 | 0.51 | —N/a | —N/a | —N/a | —N/a |
| 18 | "It's a Nice Day for a Ranger Wedding" | May 11, 2023 | 0.1 | 0.50 | —N/a | —N/a | —N/a | —N/a |

=== Season 4 ===
Viewership and ratings per episode of List of Walker episodes
| No. | Title | Air date | Rating (18–49) | Viewers (millions) | DVR (18–49) | DVR viewers (millions) | Total (18–49) | Total viewers (millions) |
|---|---|---|---|---|---|---|---|---|
| 1 | "The Quiet" | April 3, 2024 | 0.1 | 0.49 | 0.1 | 0.59 | 0.2 | 1.08 |
| 2 | "Maybe it's Maybelline" | April 10, 2024 | 0.1 | 0.60 | 0.1 | 0.47 | 0.2 | 1.07 |
| 3 | "Lessons From the Gift Shop" | April 17, 2024 | 0.1 | 0.51 | 0.1 | 0.52 | 0.1 | 1.03 |
| 4 | "Insane B.S. and Bloodshed" | April 24, 2024 | 0.0 | 0.55 | 0.1 | 0.47 | 0.1 | 1.02 |
| 5 | "We've Been Here Before" | May 1, 2024 | 0.1 | 0.46 | 0.1 | 0.45 | 0.1 | 0.91 |
| 6 | "We All Fall Down" | May 8, 2024 | 0.1 | 0.38 | 0.0 | 0.41 | 0.1 | 0.79 |
| 7 | "Hold Me Now" | May 15, 2024 | 0.1 | 0.48 | 0.0 | 0.39 | 0.1 | 0.87 |
| 8 | "Witt's End" | May 22, 2024 | 0.1 | 0.36 | —N/a | —N/a | —N/a | —N/a |
| 9 | "A History of Horrors and Other Tales" | May 29, 2024 | 0.1 | 0.57 | —N/a | —N/a | —N/a | —N/a |
| 10 | "End This Way" | June 5, 2024 | 0.1 | 0.56 | —N/a | —N/a | —N/a | —N/a |
| 11 | "Let's Go, Lets Go" | June 12, 2024 | 0.1 | 0.50 | —N/a | —N/a | —N/a | —N/a |
| 12 | "Letting Go" | June 19, 2024 | 0.1 | 0.56 | —N/a | —N/a | —N/a | —N/a |
| 13 | "See You Sometime" | June 26, 2024 | 0.1 | 0.55 | —N/a | —N/a | —N/a | —N/a |
