= Rideback (production company) =

American film production company

- Formerly: Lin Pictures (2007–2018)
- Type: Private
- Industry: Entertainment
- Founded: December 12, 2007; 18 years ago
- Founder: Dan Lin
- Headquarters: Los Angeles, California, United States
- Key people: Jonathan Eirich; Michael LoFaso (co-CEOs); Nick Reynolds (vice president of film); Lindsey Liberatore (EVP of television); Courtney Tarantin (vice president of television); Ryan Halprin (senior vice president of production); Ciao Zhao (executive assistant, film)
- Products: Motion pictures Television programs
- Website: rideback.com

Rideback (formerly Lin Pictures until 2018) is a film and television production company formed on December 12, 2007 by producer Dan Lin. Its notable films include The Lego Movie franchise, It films and the live-action Lilo & Stitch.

== History ==
On December 12, 2007, Dan Lin announced that he would leave Warner Bros. as senior vice president of production, to launch his company Lin Pictures.

In 2008, the studio hired Jon Silk as vice president of production and Stephen Gilchrist as director of development for film production.

In 2011, they launched its own roots into television, signing a deal with Warner Bros. Television, to produce TV shows, and hired Jennifer Gwartz to run the new television division with Dan Lin.

In 2014, the studio was successful in the television industry when their first TV show Forever was picked up to series by ABC. It even gained more success when the studio's second TV series Lethal Weapon by Fox and it ended up gaining more success.

In 2017, they hired TriStar Television executive Lindsey Liberatore as senior vice president of its television unit.

In 2018, the studio was renamed to Rideback, as a next generation company to focus on filmmaker collaboration.

In 2019, the studio and Media Rights Capital decided to launch the Rideback TV Incubator and kick off with the inaugural class of writers and mentors for the TV incubator.

The company most recently signed a deal with Universal Pictures.

In February 2024, Lin left Rideback to join Netflix as head of film, with Jonathan Eirich and Michael LoFaso being promoted to co-CEOs. Lin will continue to serve as a board member on the non-profit group Rideback Rise.

== Filmography ==
=== Theatrical films ===
==== 2000s ====
Year	Title	Director	Distributor	Notes	Budget	Gross
as Lin Pictures
2009	Terminator Salvation	McG	Warner Bros. Pictures	uncredited; co-production with Columbia Pictures, The Halcyon Company and Wonderland Sound and Vision	$200 million	$371.4 million
2009	Shorts: The Adventures of the Wishing Rock	Robert Rodriguez	Warner Bros. Pictures	uncredited; co-production with Imagenation Abu Dhabi, Media Rights Capital and Troublemaker Studios	$20 million	$29 million
2009	The Invention of Lying	Ricky Gervais; Matthew Robinson	Warner Bros. Pictures	uncredited; co-production with Radar Pictures, Media Rights Capital, Universal Pictures and Lynda Obst Productions	$18.5 million	$32.7 million
2009	The Box	Richard Kelly	Warner Bros. Pictures	uncredited; co-production with Darko Entertainment, Radar Pictures and Media Rights Capital	$30 million	$33.3 million
2009	Sherlock Holmes	Guy Ritchie	Warner Bros. Pictures	uncredited; co-production with Silver Pictures, Wigram Productions and Village Roadshow Pictures	$90 million	$524 million

==== 2010s ====
Year	Title	Director	Distributor	Notes	Budget	Gross
2011	Sherlock Holmes: A Game of Shadows	Guy Ritchie	Warner Bros. Pictures	uncredited; co-production with Silver Pictures, Wigram Productions and Village Roadshow Pictures	$125 million	$545.4 million
2013	Gangster Squad	Ruben Fleischer	Warner Bros. Pictures	co-production with Village Roadshow Pictures and Kevin McCormick Productions	$60–75 million	$105.2 million
2014	The Lego Movie	Phil Lord and Christopher Miller	Warner Bros. Pictures	co-production with Warner Animation Group, Village Roadshow Pictures, RatPac-Dune Entertainment, Lego System A/S, Vertigo Entertainment and Animal Logic	$60–65 million	$468.1 million
2017	The Lego Batman Movie	Chris McKay	Warner Bros. Pictures	co-production with Warner Animation Group, DC Entertainment, RatPac-Dune Entertainment, Lego System A/S, Lord Miller Productions, Vertigo Entertainment, and Animal Logic	$80 million	$312 million
2017	It	Andy Muschietti	Warner Bros. Pictures	co-production with New Line Cinema, Vertigo Entertainment and KatzSmith Productions	$35 million	$701.8 million
2017	The Lego Ninjago Movie	Charlie Bean; Paul Fisher; Bob Logan	Warner Bros. Pictures	co-production with Warner Animation Group, RatPac-Dune Entertainment, Lego System A/S, Lord Miller Productions, Vertigo Entertainment, and Animal Logic	$70 million	$123.1 million
as Rideback
2019	The Lego Movie 2: The Second Part	Mike Mitchell	Warner Bros. Pictures	co-production with Warner Animation Group, Lego System A/S, Lord Miller Productions, Vertigo Entertainment, and Animal Logic	$99 million	$199.6 million
2019	Aladdin	Guy Ritchie	Walt Disney Studios Motion Pictures	co-production with Walt Disney Pictures and Marc Platt Productions	$183 million	$1.051 billion
2019	It Chapter Two	Andy Muschietti	Warner Bros. Pictures	co-production with New Line Cinema, Vertigo Entertainment, Double Dream and Mehra Entertainment	$79 million	$473.1 million
2019	The Two Popes	Fernando Meirelles	Netflix	Netflix Original Films	N/A	$758,711

==== 2020s ====
Year	Title	Director	Distributor	Notes	Budget	Gross
2022	Easter Sunday	Jay Chandrasekhar	Universal Pictures	co-production with DreamWorks Pictures and Amblin Partners	$17 million	$13.1 million
2023	Haunted Mansion	Justin Simien	Walt Disney Studios Motion Pictures	co-production with Walt Disney Pictures	$150–157.8 million	$114.5 million
2023	Dear David	John McPhail	Lionsgate Films	co-production with BuzzFeed Studios	TBA	
2025	Lilo & Stitch	Dean Fleischer Camp	Walt Disney Studios Motion Pictures	co-production with Walt Disney Pictures	$100 million	$1.031 billion

==== Upcoming ====
Year	Title	Director	Distributor	Notes
TBA	Sherlock Holmes 3	Dexter Fletcher	Warner Bros. Pictures	co-production with Alcon Entertainment, Silver Pictures, Ritchie/Wigram Productions and Team Downey
TBA	Untitled live-action/animated Lego film	TBA	Universal Pictures	co-production with The Lego Group
TBA	The Partner	TBA	Universal Pictures	co-production with Billy17 and Aggregate Films
TBA	Shots! Shots! Shots!	TBA	Universal Pictures	
TBA	The 25th Annual Putnam County Spelling Bee	TBA	Walt Disney Studios Motion Pictures	co-production with Walt Disney Pictures
TBA	Molina	TBA	Walt Disney Studios Motion Pictures	co-production with Walt Disney Pictures, Tiara Blu Films and Viajes Miranda
TBA	Sesame Street	TBA	Netflix	co-production with Sesame Workshop

=== Direct-to-video/streaming films ===
==== 2010s ====
Year	Title	Director	Distributor	Notes
2017	Death Note	Adam Wingard	Netflix	co-production with LP Entertainment and Vertigo Entertainment

==== 2020s ====
Year	Title	Director	Distributor	Notes
2026	Best of the Best	Lena Khan	Netflix	co-production with 186K Films

=== TV shows ===
==== 2010s ====
Year(s)	Title	Creators	Network	Notes	Seasons	Episodes
2014–2015	Forever	Matt Miller	ABC	co-production with Good Session and Warner Bros. Television	1	22
2016–2019	Lethal Weapon	based on Lethal Weapon by: Shane Black developed by: Matt Miller	Fox	co-production with Good Session and Warner Bros. Television	3	55
2016–2017	Frequency	based on Frequency by: Toby Emmerich developed by: Jeremy Carver	The CW	co-production with Jeremy Carver Productions, New Line Cinema and Warner Bros. Television	1	13

==== 2020s ====
Year	Title	Creators	Network	Notes	Seasons	Episodes
2021–2024	Walker	based on Walker, Texas Ranger by: Albert S. Ruddy; Leslie Greif; Paul Haggis; Christopher Canaan developed by: Anna Fricke	The CW	co-production with Stick to Your Guns Productions, Pursued by a Bear and CBS Studios	4	69
2022–2023	Walker: Independence	Anna Fricke	The CW	co-production with Pursued by a Bear, Stick to Your Guns Productions, Not This and CBS Studios	1	13
2024–present	Avatar: The Last Airbender	based on Avatar: The Last Airbender by: Michael Dante DiMartino; Bryan Konietzko developed by: Albert Kim	Netflix	co-production with Albert Kim Pictures and Nickelodeon Productions	3	8
2024	Interior Chinatown	Charles Yu	Hulu	co-production with MSD Imaginary Machines, Waititi, Participant Media and 20th Television	1	10
2025-present	It: Welcome to Derry	based on It by: Stephen King developed by: Andy Muschietti; Barbara Muschietti; Jason Fuchs	HBO	co-production with Vertigo Entertainment, FiveTen Productions, K Plus Ultra, Double Dream and Warner Bros. Television	1	8
