= List of Being Human episodes =

List of Being Human episodes may refer to:

- List of Being Human (British TV series) episodes
- List of Being Human (North American TV series) episodes
