= Being Human (North American TV series) =

2011 supernatural drama television series

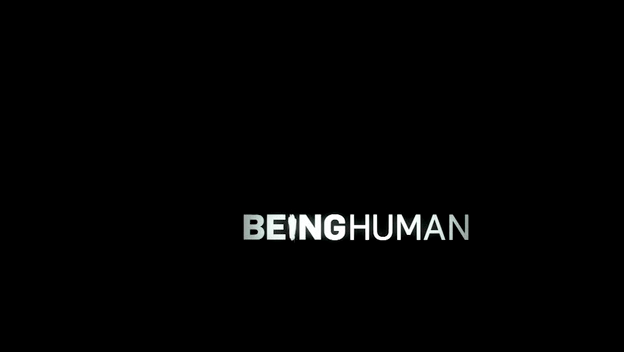
- Title card
- Genre: Supernatural horror; Drama
- Based on: Being Human by Toby Whithouse
- Developed by: Jeremy Carver; Anna Fricke
- Starring: Sam Witwer; Meaghan Rath; Sam Huntington; Mark Pellegrino; Kristen Hager; Dichen Lachman
- Composer: FM Le Sieur
- Countries of origin: United States; Canada
- Original language: English
- No. of seasons: 4
- No. of episodes: 52 (list of episodes)

Production
- Production locations: Montreal, Quebec, Canada
- Running time: 43 minutes
- Production companies: Muse Entertainment Enterprises; Zodiak Media Group (2011–2013); Universal Cable Productions (2014)

Original release
- Network: Syfy (United States); Space (Canada)
- Release: January 17, 2011 – April 7, 2014

Related
- Being Human (British TV series)

Being Human is a supernatural drama television series, based on the BBC series of the same name. It followed the same premise as the original, and starred Sam Huntington, Sam Witwer and Meaghan Rath as a werewolf, a vampire, and a ghost, respectively, who live together as roommates.

The show aired its first episode on January 17, 2011. It came to a close on April 7, 2014.

Unlike the BBC series which had experienced various cast changes throughout its run, the North American series maintained its cast members playing the supernatural roommates through its entire run.

== Plot ==
Three roommates seemingly in their twenties each try to keep a secret from the rest of the world. Aidan (Sam Witwer) is a 261-year-old vampire, Josh (Sam Huntington) is a werewolf, and Sally (Meaghan Rath) is a ghost. The three try to help one another navigate the complexities of living double lives while trying to figure out their own at the same time.

== Episodes ==
Season	Episodes	Originally released	
Season	Episodes	First released	Last released
1	13	January 17, 2011	April 11, 2011
2	13	January 16, 2012	April 9, 2012
3	13	January 14, 2013	April 8, 2013
4	13	January 13, 2014	April 7, 2014

== Series summary ==
=== Season 1 ===
In this season, the first episode opens up with Josh and Aidan moving into an old modern style home which they eventually find out is haunted by a ghost named Sally. They soon become close friends and learn the extremity of their living situation as well as life. By the end of the season the viewers find out just exactly how Aidan came to be a vampire and the background story of Sally's death while also getting a glimpse into Josh's life, as he meets a woman named Nora, with whom he eventually grows a romantic attachment.

=== Season 2 ===
After Bishop's death, Aidan has the responsibility of handling all the orphan vampires and managing the vampires of Boston while also realizing his feelings for his old found love interest. During this period of chaos he is faced with trivial decisions that he must answer for, before it is too late. In the meantime, Josh and Nora meet fellow werewolves and go on a dangerous mission to kill Ray (Josh's creator) while Sally fights her inner self and meets her mother again for the first time since she died.

=== Season 3 ===
Aidan resurfaces after being buried alive in a coffin and realizes everyone from his vampire family has been swept away. After figuring this out, he too comes face to face with death and has to figure out how to stop it. Nora and Josh meet a teenaged girl and debate how to handle the situation she brings while Liam tries to turn them against Aidan. Sally accidentally runs into someone from her past and has to meet with a witch to try and fix it.

=== Season 4 ===
Aidan and Nora make their new home for the moment in a trailer while trying to figure out how to turn Josh back to normal. Aidan learns of a new vampire boss whom he would not expect and tries to convince him otherwise while pursuing his new-found love interest Kat. Nearing the end of the series, Sally comes to terms with her emotions and finally tells a special someone how she truly feels.

== Cast and characters ==
=== Main cast ===
- Sam Witwer as Aidan Waite, a nearly 260-year-old vampire turned during the Revolutionary War; in the present day, he works as a nurse at Suffolk County Hospital in Boston.
- Meaghan Rath as Sally Malik, a ghost who haunts the house Aidan and Josh rent.
- Sam Huntington as Josh Levison, a werewolf who works as an orderly at the same hospital as Aidan and Nora.
- Mark Pellegrino as James Bishop (season 1; guest, seasons 2–4). Born in England, Bishop became a vampire during the 15th century and turned Aidan into a vampire. In the present day, he is a member of the Boston Police Department.
- Kristen Hager as Nora Sergeant (seasons 2–4; recurring, season 1), is Josh's girlfriend.
- Dichen Lachman as Suren (season 2). The daughter of the powerful vampiress known only as "Mother".

=== Recurring cast ===
- Sarah Allen as Rebecca Flynt, Aidan's one-night stand, whom he fatally drained of blood in a moment of weakness.
- Alison Louder as Emily Levison, Josh's sister. She came out of the closet as a lesbian just before Josh was turned into a werewolf and forced to disappear.
- Gianpaolo Venuta as Danny, Aidan's and Josh's landlord and Sally's ex-fiancé, who may be less friendly and helpful than he appears.
- Terry Kinney as Heggemann, an ancient vampire and elder of the powerful Dutch clan.
- Robert Naylor as Stevie Atkins, a ghost friend of Sally's who killed himself in high school.
- Kyle Schmid as Henry Durham, a vampire created by Aidan during World War I who reappears in present day helping orphan vampires, 80 years after Suren's incident.
- Susanna Fournier as Zoe Gonzalez, a nurse at the hospital in the newborn ward who has the ability to see ghosts even though she is alive and not a vampire or werewolf. She has the ability to merge ghosts' souls with the newborns as a form of reincarnation as well as merge her subconscious with a ghost's.
- Natalie Brown as Julia, Josh's ex-fiancée and Aidan's ex-girlfriend. She works at the same hospital as Josh, Aidan, and Nora, and still has feelings for Josh.
- Amy Aquino as Donna Gilchrist, a witch who works at a soup kitchen.
- Dusan Dukic as Reaper/Scott, the thing that has been haunting Sally. He has the job of shredding ghosts who have over stayed on Earth.
- Deena Aziz as "Mother", the head of all the vampires. She is the most powerful vampire in the series and is Suren's biological mother. Mother also made Suren a vampire.
- Pat Kiely as Nick Fenn, a ghost and old collegemate of Sally's.
- Jesse Rath as Robbie Malik, Sally's younger brother.
- Connor Price as Kenny, a vampire who, turned by Aiden, who becomes the leader of the vampire community in Boston.
- Rhiannon Moller-Trotter as Jackie, Emily's girlfriend who falls down during a 'shrooming accident and ends up in the hospital.
- Bobby Campo as Max (season 3), an employee at the Howell & Holt funeral home.

== Directors ==
- Toby Whithouse is an English actor, stand-up comedian and screenwriter. His highest-profile work has been the creation of the BBC Three supernatural television series Being Human. He also appeared in the film version Bridget Jones Diary in 2001 as Alistair.
- Jeremy Carver is an American television writer and producer best known for his work on The CW series Supernatural, and as the co-developer of the North American version of Being Human and television adaption of the film Frequency.
- Anne Fricke is an American television writer and producer best known for her work on shows like Dawson's Creek, Everwood, Men in Trees and Privileged and as the co-creator of the North American version of Being Human.

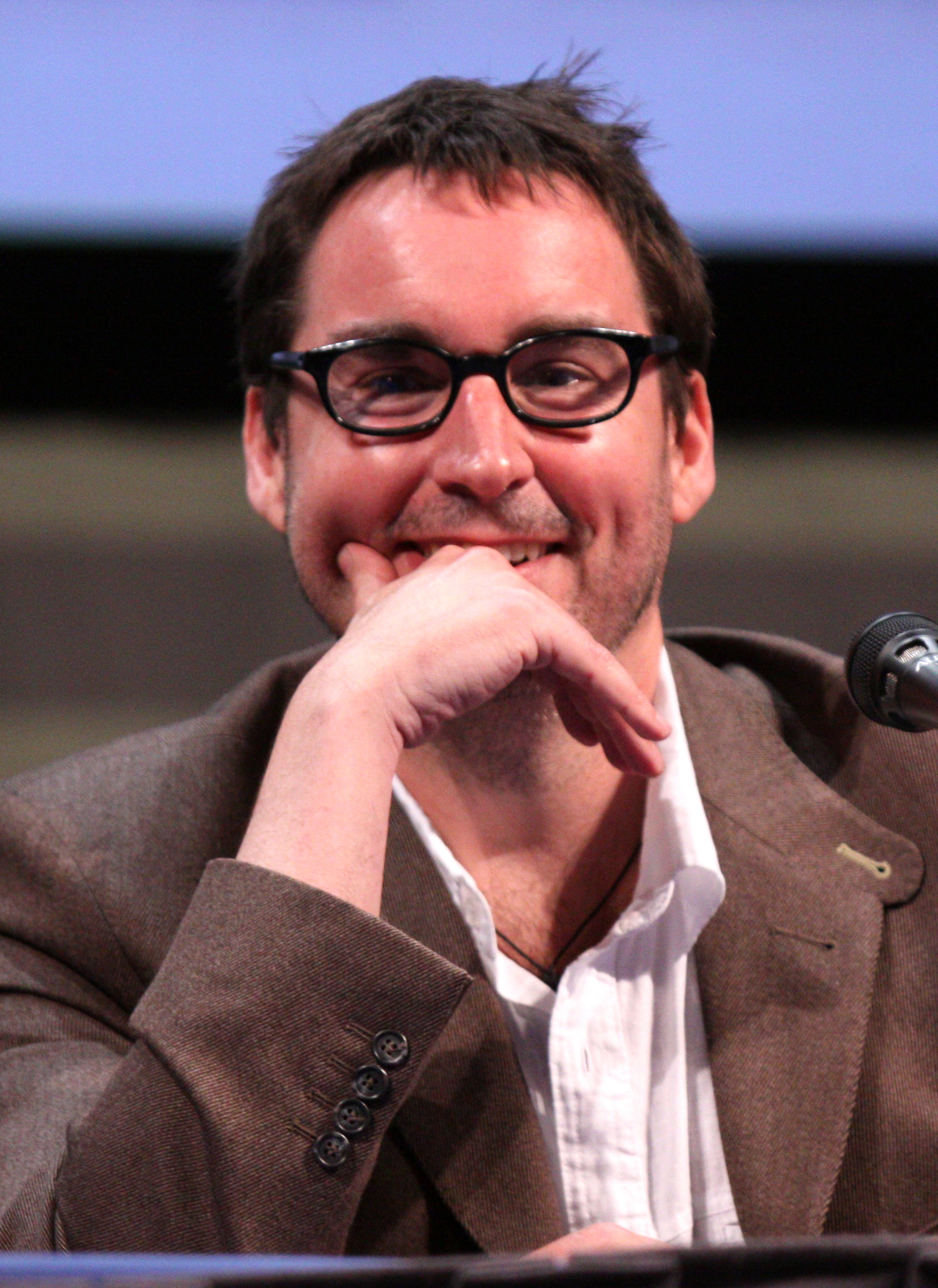
Toby Whithouse

== Production and development ==
On June 28, 2010, Entertainment Weekly reported that actor Sam Witwer had signed on to play the vampire in the remake of the British series Being Human, and Meaghan Rath had signed to play the ghost with Sam Huntington close to a deal to play the werewolf. On July 7, 2010, it was announced that Lost and Supernatural alumnus Mark Pellegrino would be joining the cast as "Aidan's charismatic but menacing mentor Bishop".

On March 17, 2011, Syfy announced that they would be ordering a second season of its new drama series, slated to begin airing January 16, 2012.

On June 29, 2011, Variety reported that actress Dichen Lachman had signed on as a regular to play a reclusive vampire in season two.

Husband-and-wife team Jeremy Carver and Anna Fricke were tasked with adapting the British series for North American television. Carver said that he and Fricke hoped "to use elements of the original series while reimagining a series all of our own. I think that starts with many of the new characters and storylines that we created. I think you're going to see a show that gives a very nice nod to the original version." Carver and Fricke said they intended to retain the original program's dark and morally ambiguous qualities.

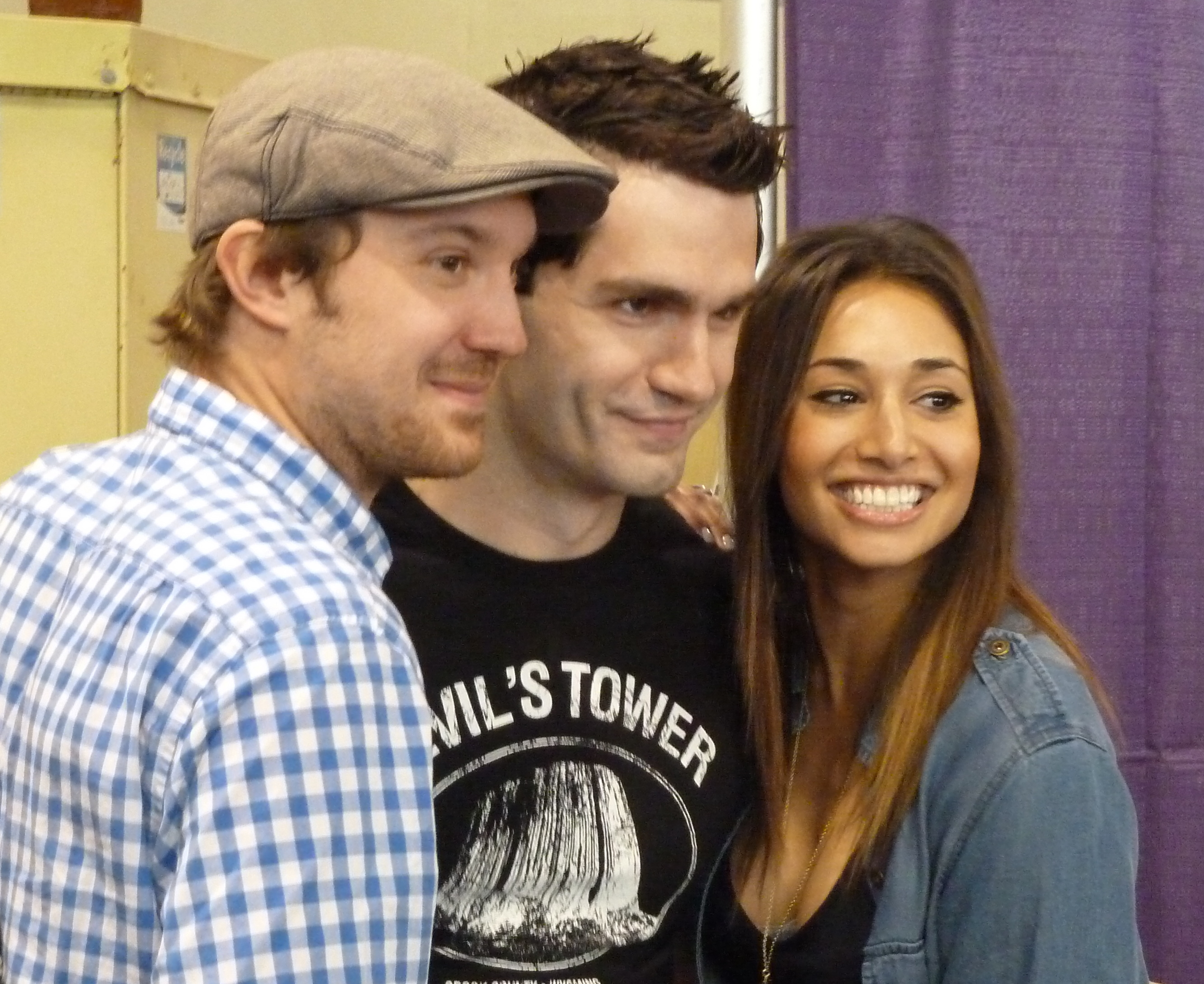
Being Human Cast at the Wizard World Toronto 2012

The first 13-episode season roughly follows the narrative arc of the first season of the British original; however, the British version was only six episodes, so the North American program developed new stories and arcs to fill out the story line enough for 13 episodes. Some similar elements were also developed in a different manner; Carver said, "We explore these moments and what the characters experienced in the British version and say to the writers, 'What if we do this differently?" However, elements of the directorial style of the first two episodes followed the original pilot and first regular episode of the UK series, in some cases shot-for-shot.

One explicit tribute to the British series is the name of the vampire, Aidan; the character is named after Irish actor Aidan Turner, who played the vampire Mitchell in the original series. The other main characters in the North American version at first appear to correspond to their British counterparts (werewolves Josh and George, ghosts Sally and Annie, vampire leaders Bishop and Herrick), but actor Sam Witwer was keen to stress the differences between the characters in the two programs: "These are not the same characters.... There are a lot of similarities, but for example, Bishop is not Herrick. Not in the slightest. He's not the same guy."

The North American series' writers, and actors, had avoided watching the British second series when it aired on BBC America until after they had finished filming their (North American) first season. Witwer told an interviewer that he had watched only the first episode, and avoided watching any more in order to avoid subconsciously mimicking Irish actor Aidan Turner's performance. At the 2011 San Diego Comic-Con Being Human panel, the actors confirmed that since finishing filming the first season they had finally caught up with watching the British series, but that the writers would deliberately maintain their policy of not watching anything beyond the first series of the British Being Human, in order to ensure the North American series developed down different paths as they moved into the second season.

On February 8, 2012, Syfy announced that they would be ordering a third season of the drama series. set to premiere on January 14, 2013.

On April 10, 2013, Syfy announced that they were renewing Being Human for a fourth, with 13 episodes set to air.

== Reception ==
According to Bill Gorman from the website TV by the Numbers, the first season's premiere episodes of Being Human averaged 1.8 million viewers, making it Syfy's most successful winter season scripted series launch since 2005. "Through its first nine weeks on Syfy, and including repeat broadcasts, Being Human [was] seen by 19.1 million total unique viewers."

Notably, the show's audience was as high as 52% female during the second season, a first for the SyFy network.

== Awards and nominations ==
Year	Award	Category	Nominee	Result	Ref
2011	Directors Guild of Canada Awards	Best Production Design - Television Series	Zoe Sakellaropoulo	Won	
2011	Gemini Awards	Best Achievement in Make-Up	Erik Gosselin, Emilie Gauthier	Nominated	
2011	Gemini Awards	Best Direction in a Dramatic Series	Paolo Barzman	Nominated	
2011	Gemini Awards	Best Performance by an Actor in a Continuing Leading Dramatic Role	Sam Witwer	Nominated	
2011	Gemini Awards	Best Picture Editing in a Dramatic Program or Series	Simon Webb	Nominated	
2011	Gemini Awards	Best Visual Effects	Catherine Hébert, Jonathan Laborde, Benoît Brière, Philippe Sylvain, Raphaël Hubert, Marie-Ève Bédard-Tremblay, Carl Gagnon, Jean-Francois Lafleur, Pierre-Simon Lebrun-Chaput, Mario Rachiele	Nominated	
2012	ASCAP Film and Television Music Awards	Top Television Series	FM Le Sieur	Won	
2012	Directors Guild of Canada Awards	Best Production Design - Television Series	Zoe Sakellaropoulo	Nominated	
2012	Saturn Awards	Best Youth-Oriented Series on Television		Nominated	
2012	SFX Awards	Best New TV Show	Jeremy Carver, Anna Fricke	Nominated	
2013	Young Artist Awards	Best Performance in a TV Series - Recurring Young Actor	Robert Naylor	Nominated	
2013	Canadian Screen Awards	Best Achievement in Make-Up	Erik Gosselin, Emilie Gauthier	Won	
2013	Canadian Screen Awards	Best Visual Effects	Maxime Entringer, Marie- Eve Bedard Tremblay, Cynthia Carrier, David Raymond, Aelis Heraud, Jean-Francois Lafleur, Pierre-Simon Lebrun-Chaput, Vanessa Delarosbil, Gabriel Morin, Dominic Marcotte	Nominated	
2014	Canadian Screen Awards	Best Achievement in Make-Up	Edwina Voda, Erik Gosselin	Won	
2014	Canadian Screen Awards	Best Performance by an Actor in a Continuing Leading Dramatic Role	Sam Huntington	Nominated	
2014	Canadian Screen Awards	Best Visual Effects	Aélis Héraud, Benoit Brière, Élaine Phaneuf, Gabriel Morin, Marc-André Poulin, Marie-Ève Bédard-Tremblay, Maxime Entringer, Michael Beaulac, Pierre-Simon Lebrun-Chaput, Vanessa Delarosbil	Nominated	
2015	Canadian Screen Awards	Best Achievement in Make-Up	Edwina Voda, Erik Gosselin	Nominated	
2015	Canadian Screen Awards	Best Performance by an Actress in a Continuing Leading Dramatic Role	Meaghan Rath	Nominated	
2015	Canadian Screen Awards	Best Visual Effects	Michael Beaulac, Marie-Eve Bedard-Tremblay, Benoit Brière, Vanessa Delarosbil, Maxime Entringer, Gabriele Gennaro, Pierre-Simon Lebrun-Chaput, Jonathan Legris, Élaine Phaneuf, Antoine Rouleau	Nominated	
2015	ACTRA Awards (Montreal)	Outstanding Female Performance	Meaghan Rath	Won	

== See also ==
- List of ghost films
- List of vampire television series
- Vampire film
