= Steve Robin =

American television director and producer

- Occupation(s): Television director, television producer
- Years active: 1992–present

Steve Robin is an American television director and producer best known for his work with television producer David E. Kelley.

As a producer, associate producer and supervising producer his credits include Picket Fences, Ally McBeal, girls club, The Brotherhood of Poland, New Hampshire and Boston Legal, making his directorial debut on the latter series.

His other directing credits include Raising the Bar, Grey's Anatomy, Bones, Castle, Harry's Law, Franklin & Bash, Rizzoli & Isles and The Closer.

In 1999, Robin won a Primetime Emmy Award for his work on Ally McBeal as a part of the producing team.

== Filmography ==
As producer
Year	Title	Notes
2021-2024	Walker	Co-Executive Producer - 69 episodes
2017-2018	Valor	Co-Executive Producer - 13 episodes
2004-2008	Boston Legal	Supervising producer - 98 episodes
2004	The D.A.	Producer (as Steven Robin)
2004	Beck and Call	TV Short
2003	The Brotherhood of Poland, New Hampshire (TV series)	Supervising producer
2002	Girls Club (TV series)	Producer
1997-2002	Ally McBeal	Supervising producer - 44 episodes Producer - 44 episodes Co-producer - 24 episodes
1999	Ally (TV series)	Producer
1997	Crisis Center (TV series)	Associate producer
1996	Mixed Nuts (TV series)	Associate producer
1992-1996	Picket Fences (TV Series)	Associate producer - 53 episodes Co-producer - 22 episodes

As director
Year	Title	Notes
2025	FBI: International	4 episodes
2021-2024	Walker	18 episodes
2020	All Rise	2 episodes
2019	The Resident	episode titled "Nurses' Day"
2019-2020	A Million Little Things	2 episodes
2019	The Fix	episode titled "The Wire"
2019	The Rookie	episode titled "The Shake Up"
2018	Station 19	episode titled "Last Day On Earth"
2018-2019	The Good Doctor	2 episodes
2017-2018	Ten Days in the Valley (TV series)	2 episodes
2017-2018	Valor	2 episodes
2017	The Catch	episode titled "The Hard Drive"
2016-2017	Quantico	4 episodes
2016	Nashville	episode titled "How Does It Feel To Be There"
2015	Proof (TV series)	episode titled "St. Luke's"
2015	Castle (TV series)	episode titled "The Nose"
2015-2016	Stitchers (TV series)	2 episodes
2015	Bones (TV series)	episode titled The Senator in the Street Sweeper
2012-2014	Dallas (2012 TV series)	9 episodes
2011-2016	Rizzoli & Isles	9 episodes
2012-2017	Major Crimes (TV series)	11 episodes
2012-2013	Scandal (TV series)	4 episodes
2011-2013	Grey's Anatomy	4 episodes
2012	Longmire	episode titled "Dogs, Horses, and Indians"
2012	Private Practice	episode titled "True Colors"
2009-2012	The Closer	7 episodes
2011	Franklin & Bash	2 episodes
2011	Harry's Law	episode titled "American Dreams"
2009	Raising the Bar	episode titled "Trout Fishing"
2006-2008	Boston Legal	7 episodes
