= List of Being Human (North American TV series) episodes =

Being Human is a supernatural drama television series developed for North American television by Jeremy Carver and Anna Fricke, based upon the British series of the same name created by Toby Whithouse. The show has an ISAN assigned root ID of 137959 (0002-1AE7) except for the first episode of season three being 213433 (0003-41B9). The series premiered on Syfy and SPACE on January 17, 2011, with a thirteen episode first season and tells the story of Aidan (Sam Witwer) and Josh (Sam Huntington), a vampire and a werewolf respectively, who move into a new apartment only to discover that it is haunted by the ghost of a previous tenant, Sally (Meaghan Rath). Together, the three of them discover that being human is not as easy as it seems.

A total of 52 episodes of Being Human were broadcast over four seasons. The series finale aired on April 7, 2014.

== Series overview ==
Season	Episodes	Originally released	
Season	Episodes	First released	Last released
1	13	January 17, 2011	April 11, 2011
2	13	January 16, 2012	April 9, 2012
3	13	January 14, 2013	April 8, 2013
4	13	January 13, 2014	April 7, 2014

== Episodes ==
=== Season 1 (2011) ===
No. overall	No. in season	Title	Directed by	Written by	Original release date	Prod. code	US viewers (millions)
1	1	"There Goes the Neighborhood (Part 1)"	Adam Kane	Jeremy Carver & Anna Fricke	January 17, 2011	137959-21	1.96
2	2	"There Goes the Neighborhood (Part 2)"	Adam Kane	Jeremy Carver & Anna Fricke	January 24, 2011	137959-22	2.14
3	3	"Some Thing to Watch Over Me"	Jerry Ciccoritti	Jeremy Carver & Anna Fricke	January 31, 2011	137959-23	1.50
4	4	"Wouldn't It Be Nice (If We Were Human)"	Jerry Ciccoritti	Chris Dingess	February 7, 2011	137959-24	1.44
5	5	"The End of the World As We Knew It"	Charles Binamé	Nancy Won	February 14, 2011	137959-25	1.09
6	6	"It Takes Two to Make a Thing Go Wrong"	Charles Binamé	Jeremy Carver & Anna Fricke	February 21, 2011	137959-26	1.39
7	7	"I See Your True Colors... And That's Why I Hate You"	Jeremiah Chechik	Jeremy Carver & Anna Fricke	February 28, 2011	137959-33	1.41
8	8	"Children Shouldn't Play with Undead Things"	Jeremiah Chechik	Chris Dingess	March 7, 2011	137959-27	1.46
9	9	"I Want You Back (From the Dead)"	Paolo Barzman	Nancy Won	March 14, 2011	137959-28	1.37
10	10	"Dog Eat Dog"	Paolo Barzman	Jeremy Carver & Anna Fricke	March 21, 2011	137959-29	1.20
11	11	"Going Dutch"	Érik Canuel	Chris Dingess	March 28, 2011	137959-30	1.30
12	12	"You're the One I Haunt"	Érik Canuel	Nancy Won	April 4, 2011	137959-31	1.44
13	13	"A Funny Thing Happened on the Way to Me Killing You"	Adam Kane	Jeremy Carver & Anna Fricke	April 11, 2011	137959-32	1.67

=== Season 2 (2012) ===
No. overall	No. in season	Title	Directed by	Written by	Original release date	Prod. code	US viewers (millions)
14	1	"Turn This Mother Out"	Adam Kane	Jeremy Carver & Anna Fricke	January 16, 2012	137959-34	1.81
15	2	"Do You Really Want to Hurt Me?"	Paolo Barzman	Nancy Won	January 23, 2012	137959-35	1.65
16	3	"All Out of Blood"	Paolo Barzman	Chris Dingess	January 30, 2012	137959-40	1.66
17	4	"(I Loathe You) For Sentimental Reasons"	Charles Binamé	Mike Ostrowski	February 6, 2012	137959-36	1.45
18	5	"Addicted to Love"	Charles Binamé	Lisa Randolph	February 13, 2012	137959-37	1.35
19	6	"Mama Said There'd Be Decades Like These"	Stefan Pleszczynski	Jeremy Carver & Anna Fricke	February 20, 2012	137959-38	1.43
20	7	"The Ties That Blind"	Stefan Pleszczynski	Céline Geiger	February 27, 2012	137959-39	1.36
21	8	"I've Got You Under Your Skin"	Stefan Schwartz	Nancy Won	March 5, 2012	137959-41	1.40
22	9	"When I Think About You I Shred Myself"	Stefan Schwartz	Mike Ostrowski	March 12, 2012	137959-42	1.36
23	10	"Dream Reaper"	Paolo Barzman	Keto Shimizu	March 19, 2012	137959-43	1.43
24	11	"Don't Fear the Scott"	Paolo Barzman	Chris Dingess	March 26, 2012	137959-44	1.25
25	12	"Partial Eclipse of the Heart"	Adam Kane	Lisa Randolph	April 2, 2012	137959-45	1.27
26	13	"It's My Party and I'll Die If I Want To"	Adam Kane	Jeremy Carver & Anna Fricke	April 9, 2012	137959-46	1.38

=== Season 3 (2013) ===
No. overall	No. in season	Title	Directed by	Written by	Original release date	Prod. code	US viewers (millions)
27	1	"It's a Shame About Ray"	Stefan Pleszczynski	Jeremy Carver & Anna Fricke	January 14, 2013	213433	1.22
28	2	"(Dead) Girls Just Wanna Have Fun"	Adam Kane	Nancy Won	January 21, 2013	137959-47	1.17
29	3	"The Teens They Are a Changin'"	Adam Kane	Mike Ostrowski	January 28, 2013	137959-48	1.42
30	4	"I'm So Lonesome I Could Die"	Jeff Renfroe	Keto Shimizu	February 4, 2013	137959-49	1.05
31	5	"Get Outta My Dreams, Get Into My Mouth"	Jeff Renfroe	Chris Dingess	February 11, 2013	137959-50	1.11
32	6	"What's Blood Got to Do With It?"	Mairzee Almas	Kate Burns	February 18, 2013	137959-51	1.15
33	7	"One Is Silver and the Other Pagan"	Mairzee Almas	Lisa Randolph	February 25, 2013	137959-52	0.98
34	8	"Your Body Is a Condemned Wonderland"	Kelly Makin	Nancy Won	March 4, 2013	137959-53	0.97
35	9	"Of Mice and Wolfmen"	Kelly Makin	Keto Shimizu	March 11, 2013	137959-54	1.12
36	10	"For Those About to Rot"	Paolo Barzman	Chris Dingess	March 18, 2013	137959-55	1.02
37	11	"If I Only Had Raw Brain"	Paolo Barzman	Mike Ostrowski	March 25, 2013	137959-56	1.16
38	12	"Always a Bridesmaid, Never Alive"	Stefan Pleszczynski	Lisa Randolph	April 1, 2013	137959-57	1.12
39	13	"Ruh–Roh"	Stefan Pleszczynski	Anna Fricke	April 8, 2013	137959-58	1.07

=== Season 4 (2014) ===
No. overall	No. in season	Title	Directed by	Written by	Original release date	Prod. code	US viewers (millions)
40	1	"Old Dogs, New Tricks"	Stefan Pleszczynski	Anna Fricke	January 13, 2014	137959-59	1.26
41	2	"That Time of the Month"	Stefan Pleszczynski	Lisa Randolph	January 20, 2014	137959-60	1.03
42	3	"Lil' Smokie"	Paolo Barzman	Nancy Won	January 27, 2014	137959-61	1.12
43	4	"Panic Womb"	Paolo Barzman	Mike Ostrowski	February 3, 2014	137959-62	1.15
44	5	"Pack It Up, Pack It In"	Jeff Renfroe	Chris Dingess	February 10, 2014	137959-63	1.21
45	6	"Cheater of the Pack"	Jeff Renfroe	Craig Lamarsh	February 17, 2014	137959-64	1.16
46	7	"Gallows Humor"	Paolo Barzman	Lisa Randolph	February 24, 2014	137959-65	1.17
47	8	"Rewind, Rewind..."	Stefan Pleszczynski	Casey Fisher	March 3, 2014	137959-66	1.02
48	9	"Too Far, Fast Forward!"	Stefan Pleszczynski	Nancy Won	March 10, 2014	137959-68	1.10
49	10	"Oh Don't You Die For Me"	Paolo Barzman	Mike Ostrowski	March 17, 2014	137959-67	1.13
50	11	"Ramona the Pest"	Jeff Renfroe	Chris Dingess	March 24, 2014	137959-70	0.99
51	12	"House Hunting"	Jeff Renfroe	Lisa Randolph	March 31, 2014	137959-71	1.05
52	13	"There Goes the Neighborhood (Part 3)"	Stefan Pleszczynski	Anna Fricke	April 7, 2014	137959-72	1.41
