= Walker: Independence =

2022 American Western action television series

- Genre: Action; Crime; Western
- Based on: Walker by Anna Fricke Walker, Texas Ranger by: Leslie Greif; Paul Haggis; Albert S. Ruddy; Christopher Canaan
- Developed by: Seamus Kevin Fahey & Anna Fricke
- Starring: Katherine McNamara; Matt Barr; Katie Findlay; Greg Hovanessian; Philemon Chambers; Justin Johnson Cortez; Lawrence Kao; Gabriela Quezada
- Music by: Sean Callery; Jonas Friedman
- Country of origin: United States
- Original language: English
- No. of seasons: 1
- No. of episodes: 13

Production
- Executive producers: Anna Fricke; Jared Padalecki; Seamus Kevin Fahey; Dan Lin; Lindsey Liberatore; Laura Terry; Larry Teng
- Production location: Santa Fe, New Mexico
- Running time: 43 minutes
- Production companies: Rideback; Pursued By a Bear; Stick to Your Guns Productions; Not This; CBS Studios

Original release
- Network: The CW
- Release: October 6, 2022 – March 2, 2023

Related
- Walker

Walker: Independence is an American Western television series developed by Seamus Kevin Fahey and Anna Fricke for The CW. It is a prequel to the television series Walker, which also airs on The CW. The series stars Katherine McNamara in the lead role, along with Matt Barr as Hoyt Rawlins and Katie Findlay as Kate Carver, with Greg Hovanessian, Philemon Chambers, Justin Johnson Cortez, Lawrence Kao, and Gabriela Quezada also starring. It aired from October 6, 2022, until March 2, 2023, on The CW. In May 2023, the series was canceled after one season.

== Premise ==
Set in the late 19th century, this origin story follows Abby Walker, an affluent Bostonian whose husband is murdered before her eyes while on their journey out West, as she crosses paths with Hoyt Rawlins, a lovable rogue in search of purpose. Abby and Hoyt's journey takes them to Independence, Texas, a small town with a big future.

== Cast ==
=== Main ===
- Katherine McNamara as Abby Walker
- Matt Barr as Hoyt Rawlins
- Katie Findlay as Kate Carver
- Greg Hovanessian as Sheriff Tom Davidson
- Philemon Chambers as Deputy Augustus
- Justin Johnson Cortez as Calian
- Lawrence Kao as Kai
- Gabriela Quezada as Lucia Reyes

=== Recurring ===
- Mark Sheppard as Nathaniel Hagan
- Nestor Serrano as Francis Reyes
- Santiago Segura as Luis Reyes
- Norman Patrick Brown as Chief Taza
- Rachel Michaela as Ruby
- Jonathan Medina as Otis Clay
- Timothy Granaderos as Shane Davidson

=== Guests ===
- Brandon Sklenar as Liam Collins
- Valerie Cruz as Teresa Davidson
- Cate Jones as Molly Sullivan
- Sarah Minnich as Martha Sullivan
- Stella Baker as Charlotte McKenzie
- Julie Zhan as Lily

== Production ==
=== Development ===
In December 2021, it was reported that a prequel series titled, Walker: Independence, was in development with Jared Padalecki as executive producer and Anna Fricke as showrunner. The CW was pleased with the pilot episode and gave a full series order in May 2022 for a fall premiere, pairing it with its parent series in a Thursday time slot. Fricke developed the story with Seamus Fahey, who wrote the pilot teleplay. On May 9, 2023, The CW canceled the series after one season. Speaking on the cancellation, Padalecki stated that the series was being shopped around to other outlets. On June 9, 2023, it was reported that it had failed to find anyone who would pick it up.

=== Casting ===
In February 2022, Justin Johnson Cortez was cast as a series regular, and Matt Barr joined the cast as Hoyt Rawlins. In March 2022, it was announced that Katherine McNamara had been cast in the lead role of Abby Walker, the ancestor of Padalecki's Cordell Walker. In June 2022, Gabriela Quezada was cast as a series regular.

=== Filming ===
The pilot for the series was filmed in Santa Fe, New Mexico in early 2022. Filming for the remainder of the season began in and around Santa Fe on July 18, 2022.

== Episodes ==
No.	Title	Directed by	Written by	Original release date	U.S. viewers (millions)
1	"Pilot"	Larry Teng	Teleplay by : Seamus Kevin Fahey; Story by : Seamus Kevin Fahey & Anna Fricke	October 6, 2022	0.62
2	"Home to a Stranger"	Larry Teng	Seamus Kevin Fahey	October 13, 2022	0.60
3	"Blood & Whiskey"	Larry Teng	Michael Carnes & Josh Gilbert	October 20, 2022	0.51
4	"Pax Romana"	Sheelin Choksey	Nicki Renna	October 27, 2022	0.52
5	"Friend of the Devil"	Carol Banker	Nick Zigler	November 3, 2022	0.54
6	"Random Acts"	Clara Aranovich	Mia Katherine Iverson	November 10, 2022	0.47
7	"The Owl and the Arrow"	Cierra "Shooter" Glaudé	Ryan Harris	November 17, 2022	0.50
8	"The Death of Mary Collins"	Pamela Romanowsky	Margaret Lebron	January 12, 2023	0.44
9	"Strange Bedfellows"	Sheelin Choksey	Grace Ding	January 19, 2023	0.46
10	"All In"	David McWhirter	Laura Sedlak	January 26, 2023	0.46
11	"The Pittsburgh Windmill"	Geoff Shotz	Michael Carnes & Josh Gilbert	February 16, 2023	0.45
12	"How We Got Here"	Sheelin Choksey	Seamus Kevin Fahey & Nicki Renna	February 23, 2023	0.45
13	"Let Him Hang"	Yangzom Brauen	Seamus Kevin Fahey & Nicki Renna	March 2, 2023	0.44

== Release ==
=== Broadcast ===
Walker: Independence premiered on October 6, 2022, on The CW and aired its series finale on March 2, 2023.

=== Home media ===
Season	No. of episodes	DVD release dates			Blu-ray release dates		
Season	No. of episodes	Region 1	Region 2	Region 4	Region 1	Region 2	Region 4
1	13	July 4, 2023	—N/a	—N/a	—N/a	—N/a	—N/a

== Reception ==
=== Critical response ===
On Rotten Tomatoes, the series holds an approval rating of 71% based on 7 critic reviews, with an average rating of 7/10. Metacritic, which uses a weighted average, assigned a score of 63 out of 100 based on 7 critics, indicating "generally favorable reviews".

=== Ratings ===
Viewership and ratings per episode of Walker: Independence
No.	Title	Air date	Rating (18–49)	Viewers (millions)	DVR (18–49)	DVR viewers (millions)	Total (18–49)	Total viewers (millions)
1	"Pilot"	October 6, 2022	0.1	0.62	0.0	0.49	0.1	1.11
2	"Home to a Stranger"	October 13, 2022	0.1	0.60	0.0	0.52	0.1	1.13
3	"Blood & Whiskey"	October 20, 2022	0.1	0.51	0.1	0.46	0.1	0.97
4	"Pax Romana"	October 27, 2022	0.0	0.52	0.0	0.49	0.1	1.02
5	"Friend of the Devil"	November 3, 2022	0.1	0.54	0.0	0.49	0.1	1.03
6	"Random Acts"	November 10, 2022	0.1	0.47	0.0	0.47	0.1	0.95
7	"The Owl and the Arrow"	November 17, 2022	0.1	0.50	0.0	0.42	0.1	0.93
8	"The Death of Mary Collins"	January 12, 2023	0.1	0.44	0.0	0.45	0.1	0.89
9	"Strange Bedfellows"	January 19, 2023	0.1	0.46	0.0	0.37	0.1	0.83
10	"All In"	January 26, 2023	0.1	0.46	—N/a	—N/a	—N/a	—N/a
11	"The Pittsburgh Windmill"	February 16, 2023	0.1	0.45	—N/a	—N/a	—N/a	—N/a
12	"How We Got Here"	February 23, 2023	0.1	0.45	—N/a	—N/a	—N/a	—N/a
13	"Let Him Hang"	March 2, 2023	0.0	0.44	—N/a	—N/a	—N/a	—N/a
