= Valor (TV series) =

American military drama television series

- Genre: Military drama
- Created by: Kyle Jarrow
- Starring: Matt Barr; Christina Ochoa; Charlie Barnett; W. Trè Davis; Corbin Reid; Nigel Thatch; Melissa Roxburgh
- Composer: The Album Leaf
- Country of origin: United States
- Original language: English
- No. of seasons: 1
- No. of episodes: 13

Production
- Executive producers: Bill Haber; Anna Fricke; Kyle Jarrow; Michael M. Robin
- Producer: James Spies
- Production locations: Atlanta, Georgia
- Cinematography: David Harp
- Editor: Craig Bench
- Running time: 42 minutes
- Production companies: Ostar Productions; Warner Bros. Television; CBS Television Studios

Original release
- Network: The CW
- Release: October 9, 2017 – January 29, 2018

Valor is an American military drama television series created by Kyle Jarrow. The show was produced by CBS Television Studios and Warner Bros. Television, with Anna Fricke and Kyle Jarrow serving as showrunners. The series premiered on The CW on October 9, 2017, as part of the 2017–18 U.S. television season. In November 2017, The CW announced that it would not be ordering any additional episodes of the show beyond the 13 episodes already produced. On May 8, 2018, The CW cancelled Valor after one season.

== Cast and characters ==
=== Main ===
- Christina Ochoa as Chief Warrant Officer 3 Nora Madani, CPT Leland Gallo's co-pilot and one of the first females to ever serve in the Special Operations community. Before joining the 186th Special Operations Aviation Regiment, CWO3 Madani served with the 101st Airborne Division in Afghanistan. In the pilot, she was awarded the Distinguished Flying Cross with "V" device for valor. Subsequent to her injuries suffered in a helicopter crash, she has become addicted to prescription painkillers. CWO3 Madani enlisted in the Army 10 years ago at the age of 18; three years prior to the series, she was a Chief Warrant Officer 2 in training at the United States Army Air Assault School. In "Costs of War" both Madani and Gallo are discharged from the Army after coming clean about the cover-up they participated in for the events in the pilot and are almost immediately hired by Thea to fly for the CIA.
- Matt Barr as Captain Leland Gallo, Pilot-in-Command with the fictional 186th Special Operations Aviation Regiment "Shadow Raiders" (based on the real life 160th Special Operations Aviation Regiment (Airborne)). In the pilot, he was awarded the Distinguished Flying Cross with "V" device for valor. In "Costs of War" both Gallo and Madani are discharged from the Army after coming clean about the cover-up they participated in for the events in the pilot and are almost immediately hired by Thea to fly for the CIA.
- Charlie Barnett as First Lieutenant Ian Porter, an intelligence officer with the 186th Special Operations Aviation Regiment and the boyfriend of CWO3 Nora Madani. The two of them transferred from the 101st Airborne Division together. Three years prior to the series, he was a second lieutenant assigned to the Air Assault School. 1LT Porter is a graduate of the United States Military Academy at West Point.
- W. Trè Davis as Staff Sergeant Jimmy Kam, CPT Gallo's and CWO3 Madani's crew chief who was taken as a prisoner of war in the pilot. He is rescued in "Oscar Mike" by the Shadow Raiders and returns home in "Costs of War" with posttraumatic stress disorder.
- Corbin Reid as Jess Kam, the wife of SSG Jimmy Kam and close friend of CWO3 Nora Madani.
- Nigel Thatch as Colonel Robert Haskins, a 23-year veteran of the United States Army who is serving as the Commanding Officer of the 186th Special Operations Aviation Regiment. In the pilot, it is mentioned that he earned the Silver Star in Fallujah.
- Melissa Roxburgh as Thea, a member of the Central Intelligence Agency. In her personal life, Thea has had short-term relationships with both SSG Zoe Cho and CPT Leland Gallo. After she and the 186th Special Operations Aviation Regiment discover and expose her boss, Director Tucker Magnus, as a rogue agent in "Costs of War", she is given his post as Director of the CIA Special Activities Division.

=== Recurring and guest ===
- Zeeko Zaki as Staff Sergeant Matt Darzi
- Valarie Pettiford as Congresswoman Simone Porter, the Chairwoman of the United States House Permanent Select Committee on Intelligence and widowed mother of 1LT Ian Porter. She is the point person for Washington in the Shadow Raiders' search for prisoners of war Sergeants Kam and Hendrix. She is later revealed as "Snake Eyes", the leader of the plot to sell uranium to Ukrainian terrorists.
- Bryan Craig as Staff Sergeant Adam Coogan, a Delta Force operator and longtime rival of CPT Gallo; the two of them started their careers together before going their separate ways (Gallo became an officer and helicopter pilot, Coogan joined Delta Force). It was later revealed the two feuded over a woman which created animosity between the two.
- Mac Brandt as Sergeant Shane Dylan Hendrix, a member of Delta Force and fellow prisoner of war alongside Staff Sergeant Jimmy Kam. Sergeant Hendrix is killed trying to escape imprisonment.
- Chelle Ramos as Staff Sergeant Zoe Cho, one of the first females to ever serve in the Special Operations community. After SSG Kam is taken as a prisoner of war, SSG Cho becomes CPT Gallo's and CWO3 Madani's crew chief. In "About-Face", SSG Cho is sexually assaulted by a Delta Force operator, but manages to fight him off; the operator was immediately transferred off the base and Cho opted to file charges against him.

== Episodes ==
No.	Title	Directed by	Written by	Original release date	Prod. code	U.S. viewers (millions)
1	"Pilot"	Michael M. Robin	Kyle Jarrow	October 9, 2017	101	1.20
2	"Esprit de Corps"	Randy Zisk	Kyle Jarrow	October 16, 2017	102	0.99
3	"Soldier Ready"	Mikael Salomon	Anna Fricke	October 23, 2017	103	0.88
4	"Zero Visibility"	Steve Robin	Josh Reims	October 30, 2017	104	0.95
5	"Full Battle Rattle"	Alex Pillai	Bret VandenBos & Brandon Willer	November 6, 2017	105	1.12
6	"I Got Your Six"	Ruba Nadda	Celine Geiger	November 13, 2017	106	0.94
7	"Blurred Lines"	Mark Haber	April Fitzsimmons	November 20, 2017	107	1.00
8	"About-Face"	Gregory Prange	Casey Fisher	December 4, 2017	108	0.93
9	"Stay Frosty"	Geary McLeod	Kyle Jarrow	December 11, 2017	109	0.76
10	"Ciphers"	David McWhirter	Anna Fricke	January 1, 2018	110	0.67
11	"Command & Control"	Lee Rose	Shamar S. White	January 15, 2018	111	0.98
12	"Oscar Mike"	Tara Weyr	Caitlin Saunders	January 22, 2018	112	0.97
13	"Costs of War"	Gregory Prange	Josh Reims	January 29, 2018	113	1.07

== Production ==
=== Development ===
The CW officially ordered Valor to series on May 10, 2017. The series was planned to air weekly on Netflix in the UK and Ireland beginning November 1, however it never arrived.

=== Casting ===
On February 17, 2017, Matt Barr was cast in the lead role as Captain Leland Gallo, a commanding officer and described as "an aging hipster meets flyboy", followed a month later by the casting of Christina Ochoa as his co-pilot Officer Nora Madani, "an intense and driven junior Army pilot who is a member of the Shadow Raiders special ops unit".

=== Filming ===
Filming for the series took place in Atlanta.

== Reception ==
=== Ratings ===
Viewership and ratings per episode of Valor
No.	Title	Air date	Rating/share (18–49)	Viewers (millions)
1	"Pilot"	October 9, 2017	0.3/1	1.20
2	"Espirit de Corps"	October 16, 2017	0.2/1	0.99
3	"Soldier Ready"	October 23, 2017	0.2/1	0.88
4	"Zero Visibility"	October 30, 2017	0.2/1	0.95
5	"Full Battle Rattle"	November 6, 2017	0.3/1	1.12
6	"I Got Your Six"	November 13, 2017	0.2/1	0.94
7	"Blurred Lines"	November 20, 2017	0.2/1	1.00
8	"About-Face"	December 4, 2017	0.2/1	0.93
9	"Stay Frosty"	December 11, 2017	0.2/1	0.76
10	"Ciphers"	January 1, 2018	0.2/1	0.67
11	"Command & Control"	January 15, 2018	0.2/1	0.98
12	"Oscar Mike"	January 22, 2018	0.2/1	0.97
13	"Costs of War"	January 29, 2018	0.2/1	1.07

=== Critical response ===
The review aggregator website Rotten Tomatoes reported a 24% approval rating with an average rating of 4.69/10 based on 17 reviews. The website's consensus reads, "Valor's attempt to highlight an often overlooked segment of the armed services is undercut by a badly judged blend of military action and melodrama." Metacritic, which uses a weighted average, assigned a score of 39 out of 100 based on 10 critics, indicating "generally unfavorable reviews".
