= Dan Lin =

American film producer (born 1973)

- 林暐
- Lin in 2026
- Born: April 8, 1973 (age 53); Taipei, Taiwan
- Education: University of Pennsylvania (BS); Harvard University (MBA)
- Occupations: Film and television producer
- Years active: 1999–present

Chinese name
- Traditional Chinese: 林暐
- Simplified Chinese: 林𬀩
Transcriptions
Standard Mandarin
- Hanyu Pinyin: Lín Wěi
- Bopomofo: ㄌㄧㄣˊ ㄨㄟˇ
- Wade–Giles: Lin Wei³
Southern Min
- Hokkien POJ: Lîm Uí

Dan Lin (traditional Chinese: 林暐; simplified Chinese: 林𬀩; pinyin: Lín Wěi; born April 8, 1973) is a Taiwanese-American film and television producer. He was the chairman of Netflix Films from 2024 to 2026 and is the founder of Rideback (formerly Lin Pictures until 2018), a film and television production company that he formed in 2008. Lin produced Warner Bros.' Sherlock Holmes, Sherlock Holmes: A Game of Shadows, The Lego Movie, The Lego Batman Movie, The Lego Ninjago Movie, The Lego Movie 2: The Second Part, and the horror film It, which holds the record for the highest-grossing horror film. Lin also produced Disney's Aladdin, a live action adaptation of the 1992 animated feature, and Lilo and Stitch, a live action adaptation of the 2002 animated feature.

== Early life and education ==
Dan Lin was born in Taipei, Taiwan, the son of an executive in the international food industry. He moved to the United States at the age of five.

In 1994, Lin graduated with a Bachelor of Science (B.S.) degree in finance and marketing from the Wharton School of the University of Pennsylvania. He then earned a Master of Business Administration (M.B.A.) in 1999 from Harvard Business School.

== Career ==
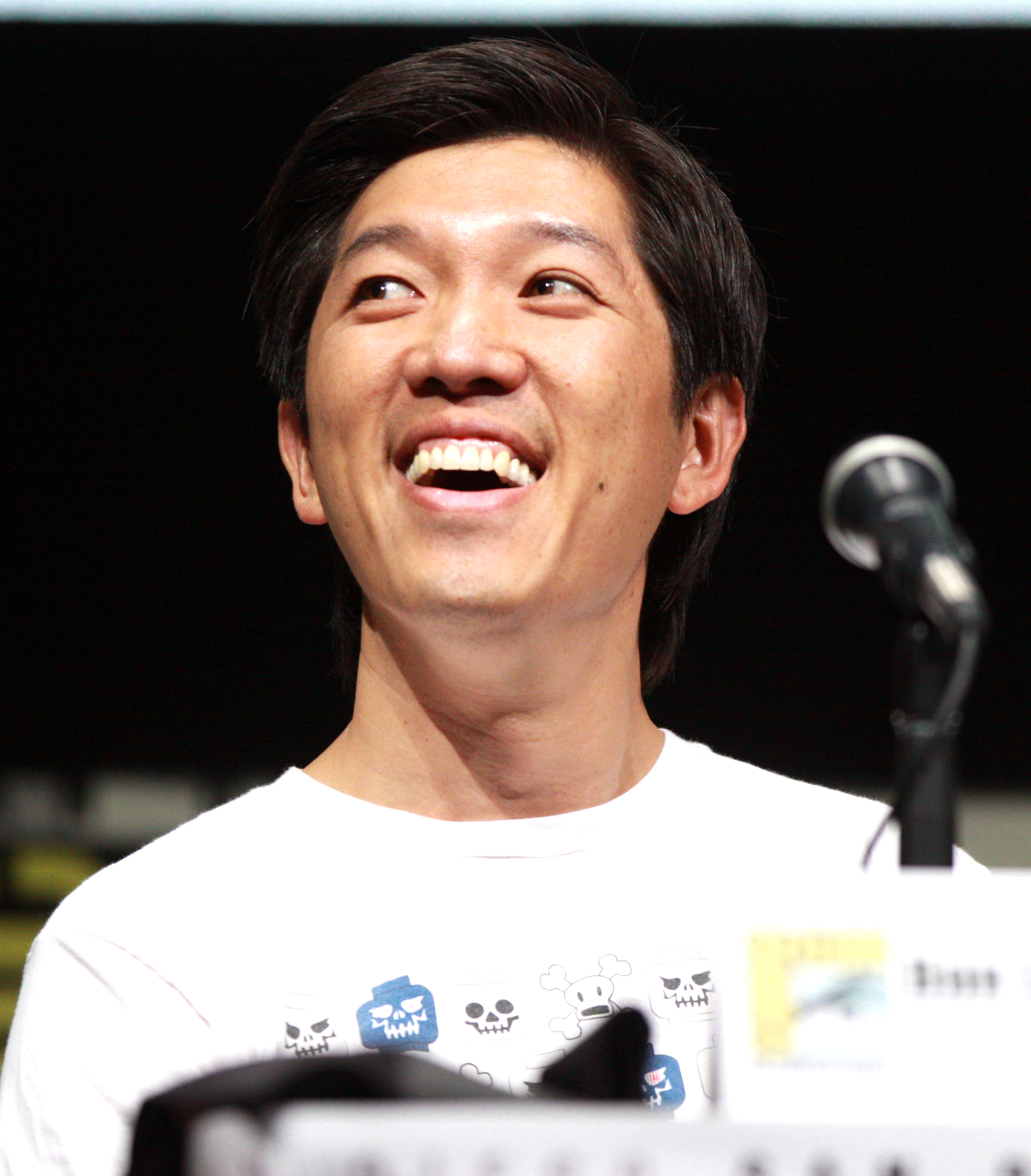
Lin at the 2013 San Diego Comic-Con

Between his first and second year at Harvard Business School, Lin undertook a summer internship program with Lorenzo di Bonaventura, who was then an executive with Warner Bros. Pictures. In 1999, a day after Lin's graduation, the studio executive offered Lin a junior position at Warners. Lin worked his way up to Senior Vice President of Production and left in 2007 to form his own company. During his eight years at Warners, Lin oversaw the development and production of the Academy Award-winning film The Departed, directed by Martin Scorsese. Other films Lin oversaw include 10,000 BC, directed by Roland Emmerich; The Aviator, directed by Scorsese; Alexander, directed by Oliver Stone; TMNT; The Invasion; Unaccompanied Minors; Matchstick Men; Scooby-Doo 2: Monsters Unleashed; and Torque.

In January 2008 he formed Lin Pictures, based at Warner Bros. He described the transition from development executive to producer as natural: "It's a symbiotic relationship between the studio and the producers, we all work together towards the same goal – make the best movie possible."

Lin currently serves on the board of directors for Rideback Rise, Hawaiʻi International Film Festival and the Good Shepherd Center for Homeless Women and Children in Los Angeles. He also serves on the Board of the Producers Guild of America Foundation. In September 2008, Lin was honored as one of Variety's "10 Producers to Watch." In April 2015, Lin was named to The Hollywood Reporter's list of 'The 30 Most Powerful Film Producers in Hollywood'

In August 2022, The Hollywood Reporter reported that he was in talks to take over DC Films. In September 2022, he ended negotiations and parted ways with Warner Bros. Discovery. On February 28, 2024, it was announced that Lin would replace Scott Stuber as Netflix's head of film, reporting to Chief Content Officer Bela Bajaria. On October 19, 2026, it was announced that Lin had left his role following Bajaria's exit from the company. His successor is yet to be announced.

== Filmography ==
=== Film ===
Producer

- The Invention of Lying (2009)
- The Box (2009)
- Sherlock Holmes (2009)
- Sherlock Holmes: A Game of Shadows (2011)
- Gangster Squad (2013)
- The Lego Movie (2014)
- The Lego Batman Movie (2017)
- Death Note (2017)
- It (2017)
- The Lego Ninjago Movie (2017)
- The Lego Movie 2: The Second Part (2019)
- Aladdin (2019)
- It Chapter Two (2019)
- The Two Popes (2019)
- Easter Sunday (2022)
- Haunted Mansion (2023)
- Lilo & Stitch (2025)

Executive producer

- Shorts (2009)
- Terminator Salvation (2009)
- Godzilla: King of the Monsters (2019)
- Godzilla vs. Kong (2021)
- Dear David (2023)
- Godzilla x Kong: The New Empire (2024)

Development executive

- Torque (2004)
- The Departed (2006) (Uncredited)
- Unaccompanied Minors (2006)

=== Television ===
Executive producer

Year	Title	Notes
2011	Poe	TV pilot
2012	The Secret Lives of Wives	TV pilot
2013	To My Future Assistant	TV pilot
2014−15	Forever	
2016	Frequency	
2018	Murder	TV movie
2016−19	Lethal Weapon	
2017−20	Unikitty!	
2021−24	Walker	
2022−23	Walker: Independence	
2024-present	Avatar: The Last Airbender	
2024	Interior Chinatown	
2025–present	It: Welcome to Derry	
