= Matt Barr =

American actor (born 1984)

- Born: Matthew Jerome Barr; February 14, 1984 (age 42); Allen, Texas, US
- Occupations: Actor; model
- Years active: 2003–present
- Spouse: Kylie Duff (m. 2023)
- Children: 1

Matthew Jerome Barr (born February 14, 1984) is an American actor, best-known as Johnson "Johnse" Hatfield in Hatfields & McCoys (2012), Danny McNamara in the CBS/Paramount+ action–adventure television series Blood & Treasure (2019–2022), and Hoyt Rawlins in Walker (2021–2024) and its prequel Walker: Independence (2022–2023).

Barr also played Mike Fleming in Commander in Chief (2005), Ian Banks in One Tree Hill (2006–2007), Christopher Sullivan in the mystery-horror limited series Harper's Island (2009), and Dan Patch in The CW series Hellcats (2010–2011).

== Early life ==
Matthew Jerome Barr was born on February 14, 1984, in Allen, Texas, a suburb of Dallas, to Mike Barr, a former football coach at Purdue University and Southern Methodist University, who is now in the real estate business, and DeDe Barr, a portrait artist. Barr has a younger brother, Luke, and sister, Sara. When Barr was in fourth grade, his family moved to Fairview, Texas, another Dallas suburb. Barr's paternal grandfather, Jerome Barr, was born Barzilauskas/Barziloski; a generational name to the Lithuanian surname Bardzilauskas.

Barr was active in the Allen High School theater program, and had major roles in many school plays and musical theater productions. This included the role of Tommy in Meredith Willson's The Music Man, and a court jester in the school's madrigal dinner.

While a high school senior, Barr learned that Richard Linklater was planning a film about football in Austin, Friday Night Lights. He auditioned for a role. Although this movie ended up being put on hold for another two years and Linklater was replaced by Peter Berg as director, Barr made some favorable impressions. Producer Ann Walker Mclay, Linklater, and collaborator and director Clark Lee Walker offered him the lead role in their film Levelland that was being shot in Austin in the late spring and early summer of 2002.

Half a year after the filming of Levelland ended, in January 2003, Barr moved to Los Angeles, where his first acting job was a scene on the television show ER.

== Career ==
Some of Barr's roles include playing Ian Banks, Peyton Sawyer's (played by Hilarie Burton) stalker on One Tree Hill. Barr has also portrayed guest and recurring roles on popular television series ER, Bones, The O.C. and Commander in Chief. He starred as David Stanley in the direct to DVD film Protecting the King as Elvis Presley's youngest step-brother. Barr appeared in the 2008 film The House Bunny as Tyler, one of the university students.

He portrayed David "Puck" Rainey, one of the alumni of The Real World: San Francisco, in Pedro, Nick Oceano's 2008 biographical film on the life of AIDS educator Pedro Zamora. In 2009, Barr co-starred in the mystery/horror miniseries Harper's Island as Christopher "Sully" Sullivan. Between 2009 and 2010, he guest starred in many TV series, such as Castle, Trauma, Friday Night Lights, and CSI: Crime Scene Investigation.

Barr was cast as a series regular in the CW series Hellcats, playing Dan Patch, in 2010. The series premiered on September 8, 2010. However, after one season the series was cancelled. He had a role as Billy "The Kid" Rhodes on the USA Network series Necessary Roughness in 2011. In 2012, Barr assumed a leading role, starring in the Kevin Costner miniseries Hatfields & McCoys for the History Channel. He portrayed Johnson "Johnse" Hatfield, who fell in love with Roseanna McCoy. In 2013, he portrayed Christopher Porco in the TV movie Romeo Killer: The Chris Porco Story.

In 2014, Barr appeared in a recurring role on Sleepy Hollow as Nick Hawley in season 2.

== Filmography ==
=== Film ===
Year	Title	Role	Notes
2003	Levelland	Zach Stanley	
2005	American Pie Presents: Band Camp	Brandon Vandecamp	
2007	Ten Inch Hero	Brad	
2007	Protecting the King	David Stanley	
2008	Open Your Eyes	Jesus	Short film
2008	The House Bunny	Tyler	
2008	Pedro	David "Puck" Rainey	
2012	Seven Below	Adam	
2013	Parkland	Paul Mikkelson	
2016	Undrafted	Anthony	
2017	Wild Man	Zuber Driver	
2017	The Layover	Ryan	

=== Television ===
Year	Title	Role	Notes
2004	ER	Billy	Episode: "Impulse Control"
2004	CSI: Miami	Cell phone bomber	Episode: "Not Landing"
2005	Medium	17-year-old boy	Episode: "Pilot"
2005	American Dreams	Nick	Episode: "California Dreamin'"
2005	Over There	Cracker	Episode: "Pilot"
2005	Head Cases	Will	Episode: "Malpractice Makes Perfect"
2005	Commander in Chief	Mike Fleming	Recurring role; 5 episodes
2006	Bones	Logan Corman	Episode: "The Woman in the Garden"
2006	The O.C.	Wes Seyfried	Episode: "The College Try"
2006	Jesse Stone: Death in Paradise	Hooker Royce	Television film
2006–2007	One Tree Hill	Ian "Psycho Derek" Banks	Recurring role; 7 episodes
2007	CSI: NY	Thomas Brighton	Episode: "Some Buried Bones"
2008	Swingtown	Matt	Episode: "Surprise!"
2009	Harper's Island	Christopher "Sully" Sullivan	Main role; 13 episodes
2009	Gossip Girl	Keith van der Woodsen	Episode: "Valley Girls"
2009	Castle	Travis McBoyd	Episode: "Inventing the Girl"
2009	The Big Bang Theory	Mike (uncredited)	Episode: "The Creepy Candy Coating Corollary"
2009	Trauma	Troy Carnahan	2 episodes
2010	Friday Night Lights	Ryan Lowry	2 episodes
2010	CSI: Crime Scene Investigation	Bellermine Quisk	Episode: "The Panty Sniffer"
2010–2011	Hellcats	Dan Patch	Main role; 18 episodes
2011	Necessary Roughness	Billy "The Kid" Rhodes	Episode: "Spinning Out"
2012	Hatfields & McCoys	Johnson "Johnse" Hatfield	Main role; 3 episodes
2013	Romeo Killer: The Chris Porco Story	Christopher Porco	Television film
2014–2015	Sleepy Hollow	Nick Hawley	Main role; 9 episodes
2016	The Interestings	Goodman Wolf	Main role
2017	Dating Game Killer	Detective Ryan	Main role
2017–2018	Valor	Captain Leland Gallo	Lead role
2019–2023	Blood & Treasure	Danny McNamara	Lead role
2021–2024	Walker	Hoyt Rawlins	Recurring role
2022–2023	Walker: Independence	Hoyt Rawlins	Lead role
2026	High Value Target: The Hunt for Saddam	Major Cal Atkins	1 episode

=== Web ===
Year	Title	Role	Notes
2009	Sex Ed: The Series	Dean	Main cast; 6 episodes
