= Men in Trees =

American romantic dramedy series for ABC

- Genre: Comedy drama
- Created by: Jenny Bicks
- Starring: Anne Heche; Abraham Benrubi; Emily Bergl; Seana Kofoed; Suleka Mathew; Derek Richardson; Sarah Strange; Cynthia Stevenson; Lauren Tom; James Tupper; John Amos
- Country of origin: United States
- Original language: English
- No. of seasons: 2
- No. of episodes: 36

Production
- Executive producers: Bruce Miller; Cathy Konrad; Jenny Bicks; James Mangold
- Producers: Antonia Ellis; Chris Dingess; Vladimir Stefoff; Asha Gill; Jennie Snyder Urman; Kathy Gilroy; Stuart M. Besser (pilot only)
- Running time: 45–48 minutes
- Production companies: Tree Line Films (season 1); Perkins Street Productions; Warner Bros. Television

Original release
- Network: ABC
- Release: September 12, 2006 – June 11, 2008

Men in Trees is an American romantic comedy-drama television series starring Anne Heche as relationship coach Marin Frist, which premiered on September 12, 2006, on ABC. The series is set in the fictional town of Elmo, Alaska, and concerns Marin Frist's misadventures in relationships. The premise showed at least superficial similarities to the HBO television series Sex and the City (on which series creator Jenny Bicks was a co-executive producer) which also featured a romantically oriented female writer. The protagonist's apparent "fish-out-of-water" feeling in a remote, small Alaskan town can be likened to CBS's Northern Exposure. The protagonists in both series were New Yorkers thrust into small town Alaskan societies. Filming for the series was based in Squamish, British Columbia, Canada.

Five episodes of the first production season, which had not yet been shown on ABC, debuted in New Zealand on the TV2 network in June and July 2007. The five carryover episodes aired on ABC after the first episode of the second production season, beginning October 19, 2007. Men In Trees was cancelled on June 11, 2008. Its final episodes aired that summer as a burn-off.

== Scheduling ==
The show first aired on ABC with a preview on September 12, 2006, after the season premiere of Dancing with the Stars. The show initially aired on Fridays at 9 pm. ET. From November 30, 2006, until March 2007 episodes aired Thursdays at 10 pm. The network announced on May 15, 2007, it would move to Fridays at 10pm for its second season. ABC held off five episodes for its second season.

Noting the absence of Men in Trees from ABC's schedule starting in March 2007, series creator Jenny Bicks reported in her blog for ABC that reruns of the show would be shown on ABC beginning in June 2007, continuing throughout the summer. Reruns of the series' first season began airing on ABC on Thursday, June 28.

The series began the fall 2007 season airing Fridays at 10 pm. However, due to its inability to hold on to the audience of freshman show Women's Murder Club and the underperformance of 20/20 at 8 pm, Men in Trees was moved to the 8 pm Friday slot. Following the end of the 2008 writers' strike, the show returned on February 27, 2008, in its new timeslot on Wednesdays at 10pm.

== Characters ==
=== Main characters ===
- Marin Frist (Anne Heche) – Relationship coach, author, and radio host. She discovers that her fiancé Graham has been cheating on her and decides to start a new life in Elmo, Alaska.
- Annie O'Donnell (Emily Bergl) – Fan of Marin's books and Patrick's fiancée. She follows Marin to Alaska.
- Patrick O'Bachelorton (Derek Richardson) – Avid fan of Marin's books, runs the town inn and radio station; engaged to Annie. Patrick changed his last name to O'Bachelorton, after it was originally Bachelor, citing the influences as O' from (Annie) O'Donnell, Bachelor from his mother, and -ton from his biological father's last name, Washington.
- Jane Burns (Seana Kofoed) – Marin's editor, falls for "plow guy".
- Jack Slattery (James Tupper) – Local biologist and Marin's love interest.
- Buzz Washington (John Amos) -–Pilot of one of the only planes in and out of Elmo. The biological father of Patrick from a tryst with Celia Bachelor.
- Ben Thomasson (Abraham Benrubi) – Owner of the town bar, The Chieftain, and the local hockey team, the Huskies. The town sports facility, Thomasson Center, is named after him. Allegedly made his fortune by inventing Wetnaps but left Seattle to get away from his various hangers-on. At the show's beginning, he and his wife Theresa are estranged but continue to live in the same house while Theresa conducts several affairs. When he and Sara resume their old relationship, he asks Theresa to move out. He and Theresa eventually reconcile.
- Sara Jackson (Suleka Mathew) – The town's former "working girl", single mother who now works at The Chieftain with one-time boyfriend Ben.
- Theresa Thomasson (Sarah Strange) – Ben's wife, once estranged from him, who works as the town barmaid. Even though she and Ben are separated, they live under the same roof. It's only after Ben asks her to leave following the resumption of his relationship with Sara that she realizes how much she loves him. Theresa also reveals the motives behind her behavior: her marriage with Ben is her first relationship that hasn't turned abusive, and it scares her. She is a former backup singer for Jewel.
- Police Chief Celia Bachelor (Cynthia Stevenson) – Patrick's clingy, widowed mother. Celia's maiden name is Hisbut. (Episodes 14-36, recurring previously).
- Mai Washington (Lauren Tom) – Buzz's wife, an entrepreneur who sells various items taken from unclaimed luggage. (Episodes 14-36, recurring previously).

=== Recurring characters ===
- Jerome Robinsky (Timothy Webber) – Regular patron at the Chieftain. As the show progresses, bits of Jerome's past are revealed (for example, in "The Girl Who Cried Wolf," several pictures of a younger Jerome are seen with various world leaders, and in "Sonata in Three Parts," he reveals to Annie that he is a composer. His last name is also revealed.) He was previously involved with Annie's mother Mary Alice, but the relationship ended when Jerome discovered she had gone back to her husband. He composes a song for her, which he plays at Sam and Jane's wedding in New York.
- Carl (Adrian McMorran)
- Lynn Barstow (Justine Bateman) – Jack's pregnant ex-girlfriend who has again left Elmo because Jack didn't love her.
- Police Supervisor Richard Ellis (Currie Graham) – Celia Bachelor's boyfriend
- Sam Soloway/"Plow Guy" (Ty Olsson) – Jane's husband who drives a plow
- Stuart Maxson (Jason O'Mara) – Marin's book publisher
- Cash (Scott Elrod) – An attractive handyman who finishes repairing Marin's cabin in exchange for a place to live and has a secret: he's dying of kidney failure.
- Eric (Nicholas Lea) – The minister at the local church who dates Sara.
- George Washington (Orlando Jones) – Buzz Washington's gay son.
- Terri (Mario Cantone) – Elmo's only hairdresser, a New York transplant, and occasional boyfriend of George Washington. He donates a kidney to Cash.
- Ivan Palacinke (Diego Klattenhoff) – Croatian ice hockey player

== Episodes ==
Season	Episodes	Originally released	
Season	Episodes	First released	Last released
1	17	September 12, 2006	February 15, 2007
2	19	October 12, 2007	June 11, 2008

=== Season 1: 2006–07 ===
No. overall	No. in season	Title	Directed by	Written by	Original release date	Prod. code
1	1	"Pilot"	James Mangold	Jenny Bicks	September 12, 2006	276009
Relationship coach and best-selling author Marin Frist goes to a small town in Alaska for a conference about real love and the best ways to get married. After her own relationship falls apart, she finds herself stuck in a town full of the one thing she doesn't really need – available men.
2	2	"Power Shift"	Allison Anders	Jenny Bicks	September 15, 2006	3T5301
Marin is still adapting to her new lifestyle and her new job as relationship adviser on Patrick's radio station. Meanwhile, she has opened the door to a new romance with a handsome stranger.
3	3	"For What It's Worth..."	Rick Wallace	Chris Dingess	September 22, 2006	3T5303
This year the town's charity Bachelor Auction host will be – Marin Frist! Meanwhile, Patrick and Annie's relationship is ready to go to the next step – meeting Patrick's overprotective mother – while Ben and Theresa's relationship gets more complicated.
4	4	"Sink or Swim"	Gail Mancuso	Anna Fricke	September 29, 2006	3T5302
Because Marin has been away from New York for a while, people there are beginning to forget her and are starting rumors she could be dead. When the Elmo town elder passes away, Elmo's sister city breaks its ties with the town just before the New Moon Festival, and Marin sees an opportunity to be useful by finding a new sister city for Elmo.
5	5	"Talk for Tat"	Joanna Kerns	Cara DiPaolo	October 6, 2006	3T5304
As Elmo experiences a record heatwave, Marin realizes the energy bars she has been feeding the raccoon are making him sick. When she turns to Jack for help, she discovers something between them has changed.
6	6	"The Caribou in The Room"	Rick Wallace	Tim Davis	October 13, 2006	3T5305
Marin wants to find out if you really can be friends after you've slept together. She asks Jack to take her to Anchorage so she can get a dose of culture. Patrick begins to wonder if there is a problem in his relationship with Annie because she always asks him to leave right after they've been intimate. Meanwhile, Ben gets tired of having to sneak around with Sara, and he asks Theresa to move out.
7	7	"Ladies Frist"	Tamra Davis	Cindy Chupack	October 20, 2006	3T5306
Marin is surprised not only by the birthday party that the people of Elmo are throwing her, but that her younger sister shows up as well. Her sister immediately has the hots for Jack and wants to marry him. Marin is left feeling insecure because all the attention is now on her sister. Buzz informs Patrick that he found a plane on the mountain while he was out flying. The plane belongs to Patrick's dad and went down over 26 years ago. Patrick starts to wonder if it is possible that his father survived the crash somehow and is still out there. Sara is officially dating Ben, which makes Theresa mad.
8	8	"The Buddy System"	Matt Shakman	Chris Dingess	October 27, 2006	3T5307
Marin tries to help Patrick and Buzz build their relationship, but things go haywire when Celia reveals they are actually related to one another. Marin and Annie need to unwind and go to a beauty salon. Sara begins to feel nervous about taking her EMS exam. Marin and Jack head out in search of friends who have been trapped by an avalanche caused by minor earthquake tremors.
9	9	"The Menaissance"	Rick Wallace	Padma L. Atluri	November 10, 2006	3T5308
After Jane leaks an excerpt from Marin's new book on men to The New Yorker magazine, Marin is forced to defend her career to Jack. Elmo receives a special guest, singer-songwriter Jewel, whose car has broken down. She runs into her former bandmate, Theresa, in the Chieftain. Meanwhile, Celia and Mai, Patrick's new stepmother, face each other in an alpha showdown for the role of "top mom."
10	10	"New York Fiction: Part 1"	Arvin Brown	Jenny Bicks	November 30, 2006	3T5309
When Marin goes back to New York during Thanksgiving week to meet with editors regarding publishing her new book, emotions between her and Jack escalate. Although she is happy to be back in a more familiar environment, she misses her life in Elmo. Meanwhile, Jack has decided it's time for him to make his move concerning his "friendship" with Marin, but an unexpected event changes his plans. Thanksgiving week is a headache for most of the Elmoians. Patrick must choose between spending Thanksgiving with Annie in New York or with his new family, and Ben is hoping Theresa will help him prepare for their annual Orphan Thanksgiving.
11	11	"New York Fiction: Part 2"	Jeff Melman	Jenny Bicks & Anna Fricke	December 7, 2006	3T5310
While Jack is waiting for Marin to return from New York, he receives an unexpected visitor, who has arrived in Elmo with a secret. Meantime, the relationship between Annie and Patrick isn't getting better after he neglects her at Thanksgiving dinner. Also, Theresa and Ben ponder their future, and Jane and Sam spend romantic time together in New York.
12	12	"The Darkest Day"	Rick Wallace	Cara DiPaolo	January 11, 2007	3T5311
While Marin is waiting for Lynn to leave Elmo and Jack, Annie thinks that Patrick can't have a relationship until he can survive without his mother. Meanwhile, Celia gets a visit from her out-of-town boss, and Sara comes back to Elmo and gets a surprise when she sees Ben and Theresa back together. Back in NY, Jane wonders if she wants to keep a long-distance relationship with Sam, "Plow Guy".
13	13	"History Lessons"	Wendey Stanzler	Bruce Miller	January 18, 2007	3T5312
Marin volunteers to help at a rummage sale to deal with writer's block and her problems with Jack. She also gets an unexpected visit from Stuart Maxson, who wants to discuss the second chapter of her new book.
14	14	"Bed, Bat & Beyond"	Matthew Diamond	Tim Davis	January 25, 2007	3T5313
While Marin moves into her rustic mountain cabin and finds some unexpected visitors, Jane unintentionally neglects Sam. In the meantime, Sara fills in at the Chieftain while Theresa takes care of Ben. Patrick is concerned he will not be able to give Annie the wedding of her dreams, and Celia admits to dating her boss, Richard.
15	15	"Take It Like a Man"	Dean White	Chris Dingess	February 1, 2007	3T5314
Marin experiments with being 'one of the guys'. Jane and Sam teach one another skills traditionally associated with the opposite gender. Jack works through issues about the baby.
16	16	"Nice Girls Finish First"	Jeff Melman	Anna Fricke	February 8, 2007	3T5315
Marin can't get her construction crew to work on her run-down cabin and meets a sexy loner. Buzz learns George's secret – he's the son he hasn't seen since the boy was 8. Meanwhile, Marin must decide if she should attend Lynn's baby shower, and, in order to spend time with Sam, Jane tries to establish her New York business in Elmo.
17	17	"The Indecent Proposal"	Sanaa Hamri	Jenny Bicks	February 15, 2007	3T5316
When Marin lets the sexy and free-spirited Cash temporarily move into her cabin in exchange for repairing it, she must get used to his lifestyle. Meanwhile, Marin finds herself unprepared for some surprising news she hears about Jack and Lynn. Patrick wants to officially propose to Annie by asking her father for her hand in marriage, so she takes him to New York to meet her parents and other family members.

=== Season 2: 2007–08 ===
Season 2, consisting of 19 episodes, first premiered in New Zealand on the TV2 network on June 25, 2007 with "Chemical Reactions". Season 2 premiered on ABC on October 12, 2007 with the first produced episode of Season 2.

No. overall	No. in season	Title	Directed by	Written by	Original release date	Prod. code
18	1	"A Tree Grows In Elmo"	Robert Berlinger	Jenny Bicks	October 12, 2007	3T6201
To help Marin get rid of issues that weigh her down, Cash takes her to visit a guru. On the way back down the mountain trail, an arctic cyclone erupts. Meanwhile, Celia and Dick take their relationship to a new intimacy level, and Sara tells Ben about her mysterious court summons, much to the chagrin of his wife Theresa.
19	2	"Chemical Reactions"	Seith Mann	Padma L. Atluri	October 19, 2007	3T5317
Marin gets lost in the woods and is found by Jack. Lynn becomes envious of the passion she sees in other couples and wants the same in her own relationship. Meanwhile, Sara's ex-husband wants full custody of her son.
20	3	"No Man Is An Iceland"	Rick Wallace	Anna Fricke & Tim Davis	October 26, 2007	3T5318
Now that Jack's fiancee has left town, everyone in Elmo assumes that Marin and Jack will get back together. Mai's cousin from China comes to visit.
21	4	"I Wood If I Could"	Joanna Kerns	Chris Dingess & Cara DiPaolo	November 2, 2007	3T5319
Romance finds its way back into Marin's life as she receives gifts from two men. She juggles being both maid of honour and best man for Patrick and Annie's wedding. Sara struggles with a church policy.
22	5	"The Girl Who Cried Wolf"	Rick Wallace	Story by : Jenny Bicks & John Mankiewicz; Teleplay by : Cindy Chupack & Anna Fricke	November 9, 2007	3T5320
Wild wolves descend on Elmo, leading to a heated fight between Marin and Jack. A series of ill-fated events threatens Patrick & Annie's wedding.
23	6	"Nice Day For A Dry Wedding"	Jeff Melman	Story by : Jenny Bicks; Teleplay by : Jenny Bicks & Chris Dingess	November 16, 2007	3T5321
Reconsidering her feelings for Jack, Marin invites him to be her wedding date, but Patrick and Annie's wedding is threatened by dangerous and unforeseen events. Jane flies in for the nuptials and has an impulsive reaction when she sees her ex-boyfriend, Sam, with his date. Meanwhile, Dick and Celia become too attached, Sara helps her minister deal with the fall out of his actions toward his congregation, and Cash returns to Elmo.
24	7	"Sea Change"	Jeff Melman	Anna Fricke	November 23, 2007	3T6202
Marin finds a mysterious woman's phone number in Jack's belongings while he is away studying whales in the Bering Sea. Celia suggests that Annie help Patrick remember his old life. Ben begins to put his hockey team ahead of his friends and family. Buzz and Mai offer dating advice to Jerome and Mary Alice, and Jane drops a bombshell on Marin.
25	8	"Sweatering it Out"	Dean White	Chris Dingess	December 7, 2007	3T6203
Marin becomes concerned when she hasn't heard from Jack, and with good cause as she soon finds out. In his absence, she is wooed by two suitors, one with whom she has a history and another who is a complete surprise. Meanwhile, Sam and Jane attend a snowplow convention and develop an unusual living arrangement, and Sara's relationship with Eric begins to show promise.
26	9	"Charity Case"	Robert Berlinger	David S. Rosenthal	February 27, 2008	3T6204
With Jack still away at sea, Marin gets an unexpected visitor – Cash re-enters her life in a big way and brings with him a shocking secret. Sara provides a temporary haven for Eric while he rebuilds his church, but complications quickly arise for the celibate couple. Buzz's efforts to help Patrick regain his memory produce nearly disastrous consequences and Sam discovers Jane's controlling side when, unbeknownst to him, she throws out one of his favorite flannel shirts.
27	10	"Sonata in Three Parts"	Joanna Kerns	Cara DiPaolo	March 5, 2008	3T6205
The town of Elmo hopes for the best when they learn that Jack's life may be in danger. Eager to stay positive, a hopeful Marin focuses her energy on helping Cash through his illness. Patrick decides to take life by the horns and asks a young girl out, Annie discovers surprising news about Jerome's past, and tensions arise between Sara and Pastor Eric when Eric's church group catches Sara in a compromising position.
28	11	"Home Seized Home"	Dean White	Jennie Snyder	March 12, 2008	3T6206
Jack and Marin decide to move in together, but don't anticipate the difficulty of merging their different lifestyles. Meanwhile, Jane is on a mission to get her marriage to Sam announced in the coveted New York Times, Patrick gets an adrenaline rush while flying Buzz's plane and wants to experience more, much to Celia's chagrin, and after doing a favor for Sara, Theresa has a surprise announcement for her unsuspecting husband, Ben.
29	12	"Read Between the Minds"	Tom Verica	Padma L. Atluri	March 19, 2008	3T6207
Jack is feeling very amorous towards Marin, but she fears that it may be for the wrong reasons. After Patrick's adventure-seeking stunt, Celia throws him in jail and he takes full advantage of his "right to remain silent." Marin, Jack and Jerome are off to New York to celebrate Sam and Jane's wedding. Sam is surprised when he learns the truth about Jane's parents.
30	13	"A Tale of Two Kidneys"	Robert Berlinger	Michael L. Kramer	March 26, 2008	3T6208
Upon Marin and Jack's return from New York, they discover Cash is in the hospital and needs a kidney transplant. Terri still feels guilty for Patrick's being struck by lightning because of the bobby pin he put in his hair at the wedding. Patrick continues to be upset with Celia for putting him in jail, and Celia is having issues with Dick's smothering ways. Meanwhile, Ben's sexy, young, new hockey player, Ivan, arrives in Elmo and is immediately enamored with Annie.
31	14	"Get a Life"	Joanna Kerns	Anna Fricke	April 2, 2008	3T6209
Morgan Fairchild comes to Elmo to sing the national anthem at the opening game for Ben's hockey team. After running into Marin and getting swept up by how living in Elmo has changed her life, she decides she wants to buy Marin's life rights for a movie. Now that Terri will be donating his kidney to Cash, Terri wants them to bond before the transplant surgery. Meanwhile Sara discovers Eric's band is more popular than she thought, especially when she meets his fan club, The Pastorettes, Patrick meets a wing woman who has designs on him, and Buzz breaks his promise to Mai and bets on the hockey game.
32	15	"Wander/Lust"	John Badham	Jenny Bicks	April 16, 2008	3T6210
Jack invites Julia and her husband to dinner with Marin so the two women can meet each other. Meanwhile, Sam gives Jane an engagement ring that he found in an unlikely place, and Annie catches Patrick in a compromising situation.
33	16	"Kiss and Don't Tell"	Sandy Smolan	Chris Dingess	April 23, 2008	3T6211
Marin wants Cash to recuperate in her home after he is released from the hospital. Patrick gets a job in New York with Jane's company as Jane pursues another client who also writes relationship books. Meanwhile, Mai moves in with Celia, and Buzz steps in for Patrick at the inn so he can earn enough money to pay off his gambling debts.
34	17	"New Dogs, Old Tricks"	Wendey Stanzler	Jennie Snyder	May 28, 2008	3T6212
Marin helps Jack prepare for his first lecture as a college professor. Annie thinks she might be falling for Ivan. Patrick is uncertain about Pilar's advances.
35	18	"Surprise, Surprise"	Jeff Melman	Cara DiPaolo	June 4, 2008	3T6213
Marin celebrates the completion of her book by taking a spa trip, where she sees Julia's husband with another woman. Patrick gets several surprises when he comes home. Sam becomes an unlikely hero.
36	19	"Taking the Lead"	Robert Berlinger	Jennifer Shaklan	June 11, 2008	3T6214
Marin gets a large check for her latest book. Sam's budget-friendly ways frustrate Jane. Sara fantasizes about another man. Patrick goes to extremes to rekindle his relationship with Annie.

== Ratings ==
Seasonal rankings (based on average total viewers per episode) of Men in Trees on ABC:

Season	Timeslot (ET)	Season premiere	Season finale	TV season	Rank	Viewers (in millions)
1	Friday 9.00 P.M. (September 12 – November 10, 2006); Thursday 10.00 P.M. (November 30 – February 15, 2007)	September 12, 2006	February 15, 2007	2006–2007	#65	8.4
2	Friday 10:00 P.M. (October 12 – November 2, 2007); Friday 8:00 P.M. (November 9 – December 7, 2007); Wednesday 10:00 P.M. (February 27 – June 11, 2008)	October 12, 2007	June 11, 2008	2007-2008	#105	5.8

Season 1
Episode #	Title	Air date	Rating	Share	18-49	Viewers	Rank
1	"Pilot"	September 12, 2006	8.0	13	3.7	12.1	
2	"Power Shift"	September 15, 2006	5.3	10	2.2	8.02	
3	"For What It's Worth..."	September 22, 2006	5.5	10	2.5	8.21	
4	"Sink or Swim"	September 29, 2006	4.7	8	2.2	6.92	
5	"Talk for Tat"	October 6, 2006	4.8	8	1.9	7.11	
6	"The Caribou in The Room"	October 13, 2006	5.1	9	2.2	7.15	
7	"Ladies Frist"	October 20, 2006	4.4	8	1.6	6.16	
8	"The Buddy System"	October 27, 2006	4.5	8	2.2	6.86	
9	"The Menaissance"	November 10, 2006	4.3	7	1.9	6.35	
10	"New York Fiction (1)"	November 30, 2006	8.0	13	4.0	11.85	
11	"New York Fiction (2)"	December 7, 2006	5.9	10	2.7	8.28	
12	"The Darkest Day"	January 11, 2007	6.9	11	3.6	10.26	
13	"History Lessons"	January 18, 2007	7.3	12	3.7	10.70	
14	"Bed, Bat & Beyond"	January 25, 2007	7.7	13	3.9	10.98	
15	"Take It Like a Man"	February 1, 2007	7.3	12	3.9	10.64	
16	"Nice Girls Finish First"	February 8, 2007	7.1	12	4.1	10.90	
17	"The Indecent Proposal"	February 15, 2007	7.6	12	4.1	11.21	

Season 2
Episode #	Title	Air date	Rating	Share	18-49	Viewers	Rank
1	"A Tree Grows In Elmo"	October 12, 2007	4.9	9	2.0	7.05	
2	"Chemical Reactions"	October 19, 2007	4.4	8	1.7	6.42	
3	"No Man Is An Iceland"	October 26, 2007	4.6	8	1.7	6.51	
4	"I Wood If I Could"	November 2, 2007	4.1	7	2.0	7.41	
5	"The Girl Who Cried Wolf"	November 9, 2007	4.4	8	1.5	6.16	
6	"Nice Day For A Dry Wedding"	November 16, 2007	4.5	8	1.6	6.40	
7	"Sea Change"	November 23, 2007	3.8	7	1.5	5.57	
8	"Sweatering it Out"	December 7, 2007	4.2	7	1.3	5.97	
9	"Charity Case"	February 27, 2008	4.0	7	1.7	5.66	
10	"Sonata in Three Parts"	March 5, 2008	4.0	7	1.6	5.74	
11	"Home Seized Home"	March 12, 2008	4.1	7	1.7	5.62	
12	"Read Between the Minds"	March 19, 2008	4.0	7	1.6	5.89	
13	"A Tale of Two Kidneys"	March 26, 2008	4.0	7	1.5	5.61	
14	"Get a Life"	April 2, 2008	3.7	6	1.5	5.50	
15	"Wander/Lust"	April 16, 2008	4.4	7	1.6	6.11	
16	"Kiss and Don't Tell"	April 23, 2008	3.8	6	1.5	5.21	
17	"New Dogs, Old Tricks"	May 28, 2008	3.7	6	1.6	5.31	
18	"Surprise, Surprise "	June 4, 2008	3.3	5	1.4	5.25	
19	"Taking the Lead"	June 11, 2008	3.2		1.1	4.51	

== Production history ==
The series was given a 13 episode order at ABC's May 2006 upfronts, to debut in the fall of 2006, originally to follow Ugly Betty. After that series was shifted to a lead time slot on Thursdays, Men in Trees eventually followed Friday encore episodes of Grey's Anatomy until November 30, when Trees was moved to follow first-run Grey's episodes. On October 28, 2006, ABC ordered four more scripts to be written for the show. ABC then ordered a full season pickup for the show on November 8. It became the seventh new series to be given a full 22-episode order in the 2006-07 season. Men in Trees was among several scripted series affected by the 2007-08 Writers Guild of America strike. In particular, 14 new episodes were written for the second season, versus an order for 22. Combined with five episodes carried over from the first production season, Men in Trees had 19 completed episodes for its second broadcast season in the United States and was on hiatus from late December 2007 until it returned on February 27, 2008, taking over for Cashmere Mafia. The series was not aired during the May 2008 sweeps period. On May 4, 2008, ABC announced the official cancellation of the show and said that the final episodes would be broadcast starting on May 28, 2008.

== Critical reviews ==
With a pleasant blend of quirkiness and charm, this is an M.I.T. we can all get into.

— Alynda Wheat,

Heche is very likable here. She plays some of the same notes she played when stranded with Harrison Ford in Six Days Seven Nights, or playing Amanda in last year's Everwood guest arc, but also crafts a credible character, and slips into her central role comfortably. Heche and Tupper explore a fiery love scene, and Benrubi's big Ben is the cuddliest TV character since Jorge Garcia's Hurley on Lost.

— David Bianculli,
