= Walker (TV series) =

2021 American action television series

- Genre: Action; Drama; Crime; Police procedural; Contemporary Western
- Based on: Walker, Texas Ranger by: Albert S. Ruddy; Leslie Greif; Paul Haggis; Christopher Canaan
- Developed by: Anna Fricke
- Showrunner: Anna Fricke
- Starring: Jared Padalecki; Lindsey Morgan; Molly Hagan; Keegan Allen; Violet Brinson; Kale Culley; Coby Bell; Jeff Pierre; Mitch Pileggi; Odette Annable; Ashley Reyes
- Music by: Jeff Beal
- Country of origin: United States
- Original language: English
- No. of seasons: 4
- No. of episodes: 69 (list of episodes)

Production
- Executive producers: Anna Fricke; Dan Lin; Lindsey Liberatore; Jared Padalecki; Jessica Yu
- Producer: John K. Patterson
- Production location: Austin, Texas
- Running time: 40–42 minutes
- Production companies: Stick to Your Guns Productions; Rideback; Pursued by a Bear; CBS Studios

Original release
- Network: The CW
- Release: January 21, 2021 – June 26, 2024

Related
- Walker: Independence

Walker is an American action crime drama television series developed by Anna Fricke for The CW. It is a reboot of the 1990s western drama television series Walker, Texas Ranger. The series was ordered straight to series in 2020, with Jared Padalecki portraying the title role and serving as an executive producer. It premiered on January 21, 2021.

In February 2021, the series was renewed for a second season which premiered on October 28, 2021. In March 2022, the series was renewed for a third season which premiered on October 6, 2022. In May 2023, the series was renewed for a fourth season which premiered on April 3, 2024. In May 2024, the series was canceled after four seasons, and its final episode aired on June 26, 2024.

== Synopsis ==
"At the center of the series is Cordell Walker, a man finding his way back to his family while investigating crime in the state's most elite unit. Our broken widower and father of two returns home to Austin after being undercover for two years for a high profile case—only to discover that there's even more work to be done at home. In a nod to the original series, Walker and his new partner—one of the only women in Texas Rangers' history—are the modern-day heroes our world needs, following their own moral code to fight for what's right, regardless of the rules."

== Cast and characters ==
=== Main ===
- Jared Padalecki as Cordell Walker, a legendary Texas Ranger who just returned home after a lengthy undercover assignment. He's also a fan of Texas Ranger Baseball.
  - Mason Thames as Young Walker (season 2)
  - Colin Ford as Corporal Cordell Walker (season 3)
- Lindsey Morgan as Micki Ramirez (seasons 1–2), Cordell's partner in the Texas Rangers. After an undercover assignment led to the death of her ex-fiancé Garrison, Micki decided to leave the Rangers and return to San Antonio to start a new chapter. This was written into the show following Morgan's decision to leave during the production of the second season for personal reasons.
- Molly Hagan as Abeline "Abby" Walker, Cordell and Liam's mother
- Keegan Allen as Liam Walker, Cordell's brother and an assistant DA for the City of Austin
- Violet Brinson as Stella Walker, Cordell's 16-year-old (as of start of series) daughter
- Kale Culley as August "Auggie" Walker, Cordell's 14-year-old (as of start of series) son
- Coby Bell as Larry Samuel James, Cordell's former partner turned captain at the Texas Rangers.
- Jeff Pierre as Trey Barnett, Micki's army medic boyfriend. When Micki returns to San Antonio, he becomes a guidance counselor/coach at the high school. At the start of Season 3 he becomes a Texas Ranger.
- Mitch Pileggi as Bonham Walker, Cordell and Liam's father
- Odette Annable as Geraldine "Geri" Broussard (seasons 2–4; recurring season 1), an old friend of Walker and Emily who runs a bar. She later becomes Walker's love interest.
- Ashley Reyes as Cassie Perez (seasons 2–4), a Texas Ranger from Dallas who becomes Walker's new partner

=== Recurring ===
- Genevieve Padaleckias as Emily Walker (season 1; guest seasons 2–3), Cordell's late wife and Stella and August's late mother
- Matt Barr as Hoyt Rawlins (season 1; guest season 3), Cordell's best friend and Geri's long time on and off boyfriend
- Alex Landi as Bret Nam (season 1; guest season 2), Liam's ex-fiancé
- Gabriela Flores as Isabel "Bel" Muñoz (season 1; guest season 3), Stella's best friend from a family of undocumented immigrants
- Jeffrey Nordling as Stan Morrison (season 1; guest season 2) the corrupt head of the Texas DPS who murdered Emily
- Madelyn Kientz as Ruby (season 1), August's friend
- Mandy McMillian as Connie Richards (season 1), receptionist and hacker for Texas DPS
- Gavin Casalegno as Trevor Strand (season 1), Clint's son who befriends Stella
- Austin Nichols as Clint West (season 1), The former ring leader of the Rodeo Kings operation and a convicted felon
- Joe Perez as Carlos Mendoza (season 1), the falsely convicted murderer of Emily Walker
- Alex Meneses as Dr. Adriana Ramirez (season 1), Micki's aunt who is a psychiatrist
- Cameron Vitosh as Todd, Stella and August's friend
- Paula Marshall as Gale Davidson (season 2), Denise's mother and rival of Abeline
- Amara Zaragoza as Denise Davidson (season 2), the new district attorney and Gale's daughter who has a history with Cordell
- Dave Annable as Dan Miller (seasons 2; guest season 3), Denise's loving husband
- Jalen Thomas Brooks as Colton Davidson (seasons 2–3), Denise and Dan's son and Stella's boyfriend
- Bella Samman as Faye (season 2), Stella's friend
- Kearran Giovanni as Kelly James (seasons 2–4), Larry's wife
- Matt Pascua as Ben Perez (seasons 2–3), Cassie's older brother, and Liam's new love interest.
- Anna Enger Ritch as Julia Johnson (season 3), a reporter held in captivity with Cordell
- David B. Meadows as Gunnery Sergeant Clay Cooper (season 3), Cordell's platoon sergeant in the Marine Corps
- Jake Abel as Kevin Golden (season 3), the mayor's chief of staff and Cassie's love interest, he's later found to be the leader of a terrorist organization. Cassie and him break up afterwards.
- Justin Johnson Cortez as Detective David Luna (seasons 3-4), detective from Corpus Christi. He becomes Cassie's new love interest. Cortez previously appeared on Walker: Independence as Cailan.
- Saylor Bell Curda as Sadie Yoo (seasons 3–4), Hoyt's daughter

=== Guest ===
- Chris Labadie as Jordan (season 1), an ex-con employed by a shady business
- Karina Dominguez as Alma Muñoz (season 1), Bel's mother who is an undocumented immigrant
- Ricky Catter as Lorenzo Muñoz (season 1), Bel's father who is an undocumented immigrant
- Andre Williams as Ranger Randall (season 1–2) good friend of Cordell
- Andre Martin as Coach Bobby (season 1), Stella and Isabel's soccer coach
- Rebekah Graf as Crystal West (season 1), Clint's wife
- Colton Tapp as Frank Delmonico (season 4), Italian Fentanyl Supplier
- Karissa Lee Staples as Twyla Jean (season 1–2), a member of the Rodeo Kings and Cordell's girlfriend when he was undercover
- Matthew Barnes as Garrison (season 2), Micki's childhood ex-fiancé and Serano's right-hand
- Henderson Wade as Serano (season 2), a powerful drug lord
- Felix Alonzo as Marv Davidson (season 2), Gale's deceased husband and Denise and Geri's father
- Mustafa Elzein as Miles Vyas (season 2), Cassie's presumed deceased former partner

== Episodes ==
Season	Episodes	Originally released	
Season	Episodes	First released	Last released
1	18	January 21, 2021	August 12, 2021
2	20	October 28, 2021	June 23, 2022
3	18	October 6, 2022	May 11, 2023
4	13	April 3, 2024	June 26, 2024

== Production ==
=== Development ===
In September 2019, it was announced that a reboot of Walker, Texas Ranger starring Jared Padalecki was in development. The CW picked up the project for its 2020–2021 development slate in October 2019. In January 2020, it was announced that The CW had ordered the project directly to series, bypassing a television pilot, and would be titled Walker. The series is written by Anna Fricke who is also expected to executive produce alongside Dan Lin, Lindsey Liberatore and Padalecki. Production companies involved with the series were slated to consist of CBS Television Studios and Rideback. On February 3, 2021, The CW gave the series an additional five episodes bringing the total episodes for the first season to 18 episodes and renewed the series for a second season. On March 22, 2022, The CW renewed the series for a third season. On May 9, 2023, The CW renewed the series for a fourth season, being one of the few legacy series to survive the network's overhaul by new owners Nexstar Media Group. On May 16, 2024, The CW's President of Entertainment Brad Schwartz stated that the network was negotiating with the producers about a fifth season, especially focusing on its budget. However, a few days later, it was announced that the network was not renewing the series.

=== Casting ===
On February 5, 2020, it was announced that Lindsey Morgan had joined Walker in the role of Micki, Walker's new partner in the Texas Rangers. The same month, Keegan Allen was cast in the role of Walker's brother, Liam, while Mitch Pileggi and Molly Hagan were cast as Walker's father and mother, Bonham and Abeline, respectively. On February 28, 2020, it was announced that Coby Bell had joined the series, playing the role of Texas Ranger Captain Larry James. On March 4, 2020, Jeff Pierre was cast as a series regular. On March 12, 2020, Violet Brinson and Kale Culley joined the cast as series regulars. On September 14, 2020, Genevieve Padalecki, Jared Padalecki's wife, was cast in a recurring role. On October 30, 2020, Odette Annable was cast in a recurring role. In November 2020, Chris Labadie and Alex Landi joined the cast in recurring roles. On December 4, 2020, Gabriela Flores was cast in a recurring role. On January 7, 2021, Rebekah Graf joined the cast in a recurring capacity. On February 19, 2021, Alex Meneses was cast in a recurring role. On April 29, 2021, it was reported that Odette Annable was promoted as a series regular for the second season. On August 31, 2021, it was announced that Dave Annable joined the cast in a recurring role for the second season. On October 22, 2021, it was announced that Mason Thames would have a recurring role as Young Walker. Jalen Thomas Brooks was also cast as Colton Davidson. Colin Ford, who played young Sam Winchester on Supernatural, appeared several times as soldier-aged Walker in season 3.

=== Filming ===
Production for Season 1 began in October 2020 and ended in April 2021. During a meeting on October 15, 2020, the Austin City Council approved an agreement for $141,326 in incentives that would allow the reboot, Walker, to start filming in Austin. The Texas Film Commission is planning to offer an incentive of $9.3 million.

Production for Season 2 began in September 2021 and ended in April 2022. To keep the series in Austin, the Austin City Council agreed to give this season nearly $214,000 in incentives.

Production for Season 3 began in August 2022 and ended in March 2023. The Austin City Council agreed to give this season $245,471 in incentives.

== Release ==
=== Marketing ===
On December 14, 2020, The CW released the first official trailer for the series.

=== Broadcast ===
Walker premiered on January 21, 2021, as part of The CW's 2020–21 television season. In Canada, the series airs on the CTV Drama Channel, simulcast with The CW in the United States. The second season premiered on October 28, 2021. The third season premiered on October 6, 2022. The fourth season premiered on April 3, 2024.

=== Home media ===
Season	No. of episodes	DVD region 1 release date	Blu-ray region 1 release date
1	18	October 26, 2021	September 20, 2022
2	20	October 4, 2022	May 16, 2023
3	18	July 11, 2023	—N/a
The Final Season	13	August 20, 2024	—N/a
The Complete Series	69	October 22, 2024	—N/a

== Reception ==
=== Critical response ===
On the review aggregator website Rotten Tomatoes, the first season has an approval rating of 32% based on 19 critic reviews, with an average rating of 4.93/10. The website's critic consensus states, "Despite decent performances, Walker's bland storytelling and limited action fails to fill its namesake's butt-kicking boots." On Metacritic, it has a weighted average score of 51 out of 100 based on 8 critic reviews, indicating "mixed or average reviews".

=== Ratings ===
The Walker pilot marked The CW's most-watched telecast since January 30, 2018, and its most-watched season premiere since The Flash (season 4) in October 2017. The premiere also garnered the highest viewership for any episode in its time slot in four years, since the airing of the "Invasion!" episode of the show Legends of Tomorrow. It also attracted the largest Live+7-day viewership for a new series since 2016's Legends of Tomorrow.

Viewership and ratings per season of Walker
Season	Timeslot (ET)	Episodes	First aired		Last aired		TV season	Viewership rank	Avg. viewers (millions)
Season	Timeslot (ET)	Episodes	Date	Viewers (millions)	Date	Viewers (millions)	TV season	Viewership rank	Avg. viewers (millions)
1	Thursday 8:00 p.m.	18	January 21, 2021	2.44	August 12, 2021	1.10	2020–21	110	2.54
2	Thursday 8:00 p.m.	20	October 28, 2021	0.95	June 23, 2022	0.84	2021–22	TBD	TBD
3	Thursday 8:00 p.m.	18	October 6, 2022	0.76	May 11, 2023	0.50	2022–23	TBD	TBD
4	Wednesday 8:00 p.m.	13	April 3, 2024	0.49	June 26, 2024	0.55	2023–24	TBD	TBD

== Prequel series ==
In December 2021, it was reported that a prequel series titled Walker: Independence was in development at The CW with Padalecki as executive producer and Fricke as showrunner. A pilot order was confirmed in February 2022. Larry Teng would direct the pilot, Justin Johnson Cortez was cast as a series regular, and Matt Barr was also cast as Hoyt Rawlins. In March 2022, it was announced that Katherine McNamara had been cast in the lead role. She will be portraying Abby Walker, the ancestor of Padalecki's Cordell Walker. Also that month, Lawrence Kao, Greg Hovanessian, Philemon Chambers and Katie Findlay joined the cast as series regulars. In May 2022, The CW picked up the series for a fall premiere and paired it with its parent series in a Thursday time slot. In June 2022, Gabriela Quezada was cast as a series regular. The series premiered in October 2022, but was canceled in May 2023 after a single season.
