= Anna Fricke =

American television writer and producer

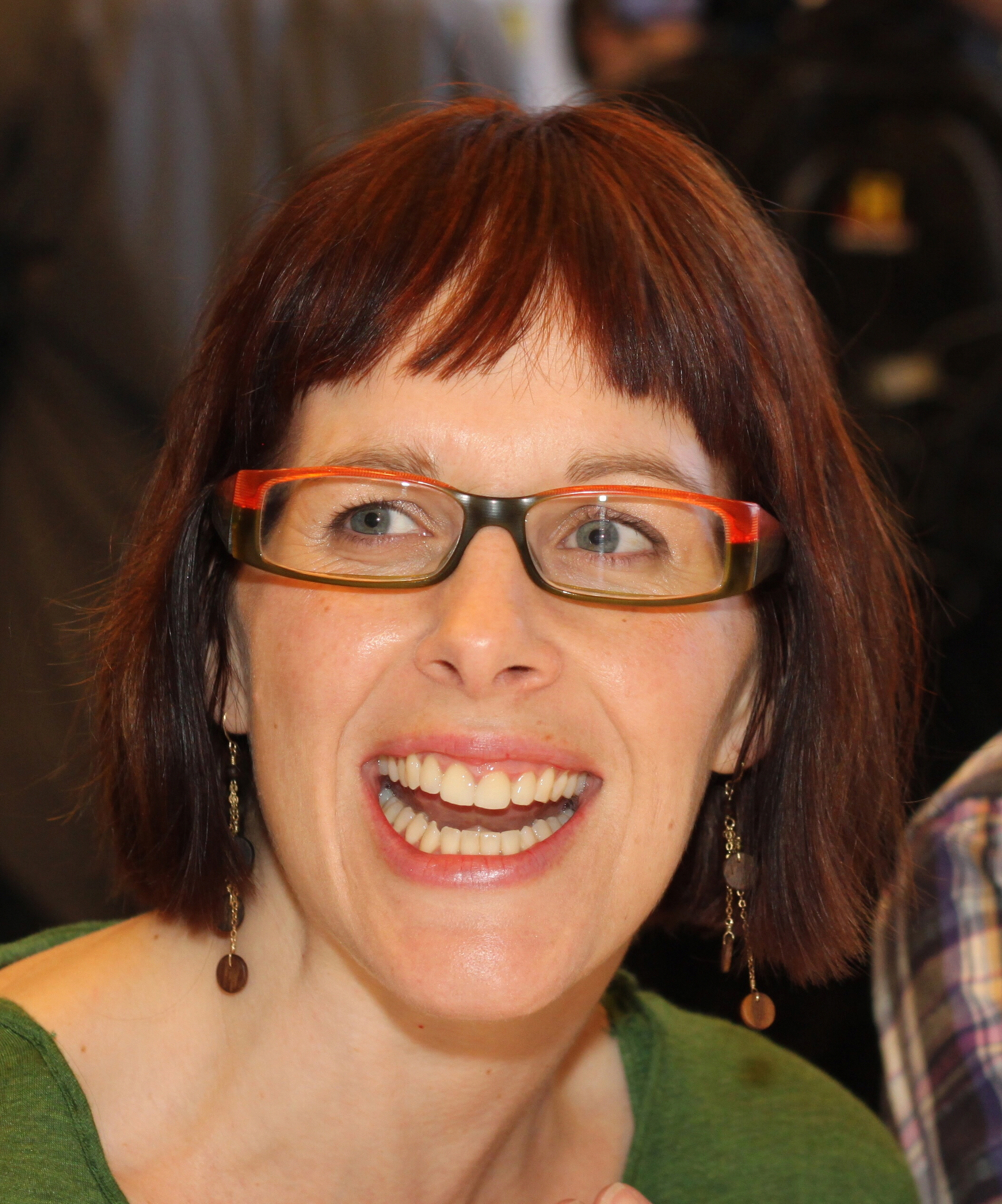
- Born: United States
- Occupations: Television writer, producer
- Years active: 2001–present
- Spouse: Jeremy Carver

Anna Fricke is an American television writer and producer best known for her work on shows like Dawson's Creek, Everwood, Men in Trees and Privileged and as the co-creator of the North American version of Being Human.

== Career ==
In 2001, Fricke served as a writer on a failed television pilot entitled Rachels's Room. Since then, she has worked as a writer and producer on a number of series, Dawson's Creek, Everwood, Men in Trees and Privileged among them. At the beginning of 2010 she teamed with her husband Jeremy Carver to develop a North American version of the British drama series Being Human, on which she served as an executive producer and head writer. The show finished at the end of its fourth season.

== Filmography ==
Year	Title	Credited as				Network
Year	Title	Creator	Writer	Executive Producer	Producer	Network
2001–2003	Dawson's Creek	No	Yes	No	No	The WB
2004	Touching Evil	No	Yes	No	No	USA Network
2004–2006	Everwood	No	Yes	No	Yes	The WB
2006–2008	Men in Trees	No	Yes	Yes	No	ABC
2008–2009	Privileged	No	Yes	No	No	The CW
2009	The Beautiful Life	No	Yes	Yes	No	The CW
2011–2014	Being Human	Developer	Yes	Yes	No	Syfy
2014–2015	Red Band Society	No	No	No	Consulting	Fox
2015	Minority Report	No	Yes	Yes	No	Fox
2016	Wayward Pines	No	Yes	Yes	No	Fox
2017–2018	Valor	No	Yes	Yes	No	The CW
2021–2024	Walker	Developer	Yes	Yes	No	The CW
2021	4400	No	No	Yes	No	The CW
2022-2023	Walker: Independence	Yes	Yes	Yes	No	The CW
