= Survivance (disambiguation) =

Survivance is a term meaning "relict", "survival", "survivorship"

Suvivance may refer to:

- Survivance (Amerindian), an English term that was reinterpreted to relate to Native Americans and the survival of their identity in the face of the forces of assimilation of post colonial culture
- La Survivance (Francophone Canadian), a French term borrowed into English about the survival of the French language and French Canadian identity in the face of the forces of assimilation of the English language world
- Survivance (videogame), a 2011 videogame; see Indigenous people in video games
- Survivance (album), a 2017 album by Rob Ruha

== See also ==
- Survivants (disambiguation)
- Survive (disambiguation)
- Survival (disambiguation)
- Survivor (disambiguation)
- Surviving
- Survivability
