= Surviving (disambiguation) =

Surviving is the act of survival. The surviving are those that survive..

Surviving or variant, may also refer to:

- Surviving: A Family in Crisis (film), a 1985 telefilm
- Surviving (album), a 2019 album by Jimmy Eat World

== See also ==
- Survivability
- Survive (disambiguation)
- Survival (disambiguation)
- Survivor (disambiguation)
- Sole Survivor (disambiguation)
- Lone Survivor (disambiguation)
- Survival Skill (disambiguation)
