= Survivalism (disambiguation) =

Survivalism is preparation for various emergencies as well as possible disruptions in the social or political order.

Survivalism or survivalist may also refer to:

- "Survivalism" (song), a song by Nine Inch Nails
- Survivalism (life after death), a philosophical view that the human being and their soul survive after death
- Survivalist Party, a fictional political party in the novel Ecotopia Emerging
- The Survivalist (disambiguation)

== See also ==
- Survival (disambiguation)
- Survivor (disambiguation)
