= Survivor =

A survivor is one who survives.

Survivor(s) may also refer to:

== Arts, entertainment and media ==
=== Fictional entities ===
- Survivors, characters in the 1997 KKnD video-game series
- The Survivors, or the New Survivors Foundation, a fictional cult from Robert Muchamore's a 2006 novel Divine Madness

=== Films ===
- Survivor (1987 film), a film written by Bima Stagg
- Survivor (2008 film), a film featuring Cyril Nri
- Survivor (2014 film), a film featuring Danielle Chuchran and Kevin Sorbo
- Survivor (film), a 2015 British spy-thriller starring Milla Jovovich and Pierce Brosnan
- Survivors (2015 film), a British horror
- Survivors (2018 film), a Sierra Leonean documentary
- Survivors (2022 film), a Nigerian comedy
- The Survivors (1983 film)
- The Survivor (2016 film), a short about the 2014 APS Massacre

=== Games ===
- Survivor (1982 video game), a 1982 shooter game
- Survivor (1987 video game), a 1987 8-bit action game
- Survivor (2001 video game), a tie-in to the Survivor reality TV franchise
- Survivors (video game), 1986, published by Atlantis Software
- Resident Evil Survivor, a 2000 light gun shooter
- Star Wars Jedi: Survivor, a 2023 action-adventure video game

=== Literature ===
- Survivor (Butler novel), a 1978 science fiction novel by Octavia Butler
- Survivor (Gonzalez novel), a 2004 horror novel by J. F. Gonzalez
- Survivor (Palahniuk novel), a 1999 satirical novel by Chuck Palahniuk
- "Survivor" (story), a 2004 novella in Accelerando by Charles Stross
- Survivor, a 1988 novel by Christina Crawford
- Survivor, a 2004 novel by William W. Johnstone that begins The Last Rebel series
- Survivor, a 1997 novel by Tabitha King
- Survivor, a 2011 novel by James Clancy Phelan
- Survivors (novel series), series of children's novels by Erin Hunter
- Survivors (Lorrah novel), 1989 Star Trek: The Next Generation novel by Jean Lorrah
- Survivors, a 1976 novel by Terry Nation, adapted from the eponymous 1970s TV series
- Survivors: A Novel of the Coming Collapse, 2011 novel by James Wesley Rawles
- Survivors (French: Survivants), a French comic book in the Worlds of Aldebaran comic book series

=== Music ===
==== Groups and labels ====
- Survivor (band), an American rock band
- Survivor Records, a British Christian music record label

==== Albums ====
- Survivor (Destiny's Child album) or the title song (see below), 2001
- Survivor (Eric Burdon album), 1978
- Survivor (Fifteen album) or the title song, 2000
- Survivor (George Fox album) or the title song, 1998
- Survivor (Randy Bachman album) or the title song, 1978
- Survivor (Survivor album), 1979
- Survivor (Vanessa Williams album) or the title song, 2024
- Survivor: Live from Harding Prison, by Zach Williams, 2018
- Survivor, by Funker Vogt, 2002
- Survivor, by Stuck in the Sound, 2016
- Survivors (Max Roach album) or the title song, 1984
- Survivors (Samson album), 1979

==== Songs ====
- "Survivor" (Destiny's Child song), 2001
- "Survivor" (Helena Paparizou song), 2014
- "Survivor" (Parg song), 2025
- "Survivor" (Pop Evil song), 2021
- "Survivor" (TVXQ song), 2009
- "Survivor", by Cindy Bullens from Desire Wire, 1978
- "Survivor", by Emeli Sandé from Real Life, 2019
- "Survivor", by Genesis Owusu from Struggler, 2023
- "Survivor", by Mavado
- "Survivor", by M.I.A. from AIM, 2016
- "Survivor", by Mike Francis, 1983
- "Survivor", by Scott Stapp from The Space Between the Shadows, 2019
- "Survivor", by Vanilla Ice from Platinum Underground, 2005
- "Survivor", by Zach Williams from Chain Breaker, 2016
- "Survivors", by the Afters from Live On Forever, 2016
- "Survivors", by Hardwell and Dannic, 2015
- "Survivors", by Selena Gomez from Revival, 2015
- "Survivors", by Zomboy, 2014

=== Television ===
==== Series ====
- Survivor (franchise), a reality-television show with numerous international versions:
  - Australian Survivor
  - Survivor (American TV series)
  - Survivor (British TV series)
  - Survivor (Israeli TV series), formerly Survivor 10
  - Survivor India
    - Survivor India – The Ultimate Battle (Hindi TV series)
    - Survivor (Tamil TV series)
  - Survivor BG, Bulgaria
  - Survivor Philippines
  - Survivor South Africa
  - Survivor Srbija, Serbia
  - Survivor Turkey, Türkiye
  - See the main article for a list of other international versions
- Survivor Series, a professional wrestling pay-per-view event
- The Survivors, an American primetime soap opera
- Survivors (1975 TV series), a British post-apocalyptic fiction series
- Survivors (2008 TV series), an adaptation of Terry Nation's eponymous book
- The Survivors (Australian TV series), a 2025 series

==== Episodes ====
- "The Survivor" (Star Trek: The Animated Series), 1973
- "The Survivors" (Star Trek: The Next Generation), 1989
- "Survivors" (Babylon 5), 1994
- "Survivor" (Out of the Blue), 1995
- "Survivors" (Supergirl), 2016
- "Survivors" (Shameless), 2021

== Other uses ==
- Survivor (horse), a racehorse that won the first Preakness Stakes in 1873
- Survivor: The Ride!, a former roller coaster in California's Great America, in Santa Clara, California, U.S.

== See also ==
- Category:Survivors
- The Survivor (disambiguation)
- Lone Survivor (disambiguation)
- Sole Survivor (disambiguation)
- Survivor Song, a 2020 horror novel by American author Paul Tremblay
- Survival (disambiguation)
- Survivants (disambiguation) (French: Survivors)
- Survive (disambiguation)
- Surviving (disambiguation)
- Survivor guilt, a mental condition
