= The Survivor =

The Survivor or The Survivors may refer to:

== Art, entertainment, and media ==
=== Audio play ===
- The Survivors (Doctor Who audio), audio play

=== Film ===
- The Survivor (1972 film), an Australian film
- The Survivors (1979 film), a Cuban drama film
- The Survivor (1981 film), starring Robert Powell and Jenny Agutter
- The Survivors (1983 film), an American comedy film
- The Survivor (1996 film)
- The Survivor (2021 film)

=== Literature ===
- The Survivor, a 1901 novel by E. Phillips Oppenheim
- The Survivors, a 1923 novel by Lucas Malet
- Les Rescapés du Télémaque, a 1938 novel by Georges Simenon, published 1949 in English as The Survivors
- The Survivor, a 1940 novel by Dennis Parry
- The Survivors, a 1948 play by Irwin Shaw and Peter Viertel
- The White South, a 1949 novel by Hammond Innes, published in the US as The Survivors
- The Survivor and Others, a 1957 collection of fantasy and horror short stories by August Derleth
- The Survivors (Godwin novel), a 1958 science fiction novel by Tom Godwin
- The Survivor, a 1958 novel by Carl Marzani
- "The Survivors", a 1961 short story by Thelma D. Hamm; first published in the August 1961 issue of Amazing Stories
- The Survivors, a 1964 novel by Paul Tabori
- The Survivor, a 1964 novel by Robb White
- The Survivors, a 1968 novel by Anne Edwards
- The Survivor (Keneally novel), a 1969 novel by Thomas Keneally
- The Survivors, a 1975 novel by Kristin Hunter
- The Survivor: An Anatomy of Life in the Death Camps, a 1976 book by Terrence Des Pres
- The Survivor (Herbert novel), a 1976 horror novel by James Herbert
- The Survivors (Raven novel), a 1976 novel in the Alms for Oblivion sequence by Simon Raven
- The Survivors, a 1979 novel by Marion Zimmer Bradley and Paul Edwin Zimmer
- The Survivor, a 1980 memoir by Jack Eisner, basis for the 1985 film War and Love
- The Survivors, a 1982 novel by Elaine Feinstein
- "The Survivor", a 1991 short story by Donald Kingsbury
- The Survivor (Cain novel), a 2008 novel by Tom Cain
- The Survivor (Mills novel), a 2015 Mitch Rapp novel
- The Survivors (Harper novel), a 2021 novel by Jane Harper

=== Music ===
- The Survivors (Australian band), an Australian punk-rock group
- The Survivors, a band that included Brian Wilson of the Beach Boys
- The Survivors, a New Orleans group featuring Reggie Houston
- The Survivors, a band fronted by Pegi Young
- "The Survivors", a song by Pet Shop Boys from their 1996 album Bilingual
- The Survivors Live, a live album of an impromptu concert by Johnny Cash, Carl Perkins and Jerry Lee Lewis

=== Television ===
==== Series ====
- Survivor (franchise), a reality-competition television franchise
- Survivors (1975 TV series)
- Survivors (2008 TV series)
- Harold Robbins' The Survivors, a 1969 prime time soap opera starring Lana Turner
- The Survivor, a 1991 Hong Kong programme broadcast by Television Broadcasts Limited
- The Survivors (Australian TV series), a 2025 drama miniseries

==== Episodes ====
- "The Survivor", a 1960 episode of The Four Just Men
- "The Survivor", a 1961 episode of Hong Kong
- "The Survivors", second episode of the 1963–1964 Doctor Who serial The Daleks
- "The Survivors", a 1965 episode of The Fugitive
- "The Survivor", a 1966 episode of 12 O'Clock High
- "The Survivors", a 1967 episode of Mission: Impossible
- "The Survivors", a 1968 episode of Bonanza
- "The Survivors", a 1968 episode of The Champions
- "The Survivor" (Star Trek: The Animated Series), a 1973 episode
- "The Survivor", third episode of the 1975 crime drama series Caribe
- "The Survivor", a 1987 episode of Crime Story
- "The Survivors", a 1989 episode of MacGyver (1985)
- "The Survivors" (Star Trek: The Next Generation), a 1989 episode
- "The Survivor", a 1993 episode of Murder, She Wrote
- "The Survivor", a 2000 episode of Flipper
- "The Survivors", fourth episode of the 2003 nature documentary series Walking with Cavemen
- "The Survivor", a 2004 episode of Curb Your Enthusiasm
- "The Survivors", a 2008 episode of Ricky Sprocket: Showbiz Boy
- "The Survivor", a 2017 episode of Crackanory
- "The Survivors", a 2019 episode of 24 Hours in A&E
- "The Survivors", third episode of the 2019 drama series The Widow
- "The Survivors" (Dark), a 2020 episode
- "The Survivors", a 2021 episode of Dragon Quest: The Adventure of Dai
- "The Survivor", a 2023 episode of Based on a True Story

=== Video games ===
- The Survivors (video game), a 1980s game for various home computers published by Atlantis Software

== Other uses ==
- The Survivor (Railroad Car), built by the American Car and Foundry Company in 1926, for Jesse Woolworth

== See also ==
- Survival (disambiguation)
- Survivor (disambiguation)
