= Survivants =

Survivants means survivors in French. Survivants, Survivantes, Survivante, Survivant, or, variant, may refer to:

== Literature ==
- SurVivantes: Rwanda, Dix Ans Après Le Génocide (book; English: "Survivors: Rwanda, 10 Years After the Genocide"), a 2004 award-winning non-fiction book by Esther Mujawayo
- "Les Survivants", a 2001 volume of the multi-volume graphic novel Bételgeuse, in the Worlds of Aldebaran comic book series
- Survivants, a 2010s multi-volume graphic novel, in the Worlds of Aldebaran comic book series
- La Survivante, a 1980s multi-volume graphic novel by Paul Gillon
  - "La Survivante", a 1985 volume of the multi-volume graphic novel La Survivante by Paul Gillon

== Film and television ==
- Les Survivants, a 1965 TV series scored by François de Roubaix
- Survivant(s), a 2010 short film starring Alysson Paradis
- Les Survivants, a 2016 film starring Erika Sainte
- White Paradise (2022 film), a French film starring Denis Ménochet, Zar Amir Ebrahimi and Victoire Du Bois

== Other uses ==
- Survivant, a 2004 album by Starflam
- "Les Survivants", the nickname of the France men's national volleyball team

== See also ==
- Survivor (disambiguation)
- Survival (disambiguation)
- Survive (disambiguation)
- Surviving
- Vivant (disambiguation)
- Sur (disambiguation)
