= Soul Survivor =

Soul Survivor or Soul Survivors may refer to:

- Soul Survivors (band), an American soul and rhythm and blues band
- Soul Survivor (book), a 2001 book by Christian author Philip Yancey
- Soul Survivor (charity), a worldwide Christian charity based in Watford, Hertfordshire

== Music ==
=== Albums ===
- Soul Survivors (Soul Survivors album), 1974
- Soul Survivors (Hank Crawford and Jimmy McGriff album), 1986 jazz album
- Soul Survivor (Al Green album), 1987
- Soul Survivor, a 1995 album by Bobby Caldwell
- Soul Survivor (Gorefest album), 1996
- Soul Survivor (Pete Rock album), 1998 album
- Soul Survivor II, a 2004 album by Pete Rock

=== Songs ===
- "Soul Survivor", a song by the Rolling Stones from the 1972 album Exile on Main St.
- "Soul Survivor", a song by C. C. Catch from the 1987 album Like a Hurricane
- "Soul Survivor", a song by L.L. Cool J from the 1993 album 14 Shots to the Dome
- "Sole Survivor" (Helloween song), 1994
- "Soul Survivor", a song by the Dead 60s from the 2005 album The Dead 60s
- "Soul Survivor" (Young Jeezy song), 2005
- "Soul Survivor" (Beverley Knight song), 2010
- "Soul Survivor (...2012)", a song by Angels & Airwaves from the 2010 album Love
- "Soul Survivor", a song by Rita Ora from the 2018 album Phoenix

== Film ==
- Soul Survivor (film), a 1995 film by Stephen Williams
- Soul Survivors (film), a 2001 film starring Melissa Sagemiller

== Television ==
- "Soul Survivor" (Charmed), an episode in 2003 of the television series Charmed
- Soul Survivor (Supernatural), an episode in 2014 of the television series Supernatural

== See also ==
- Sole Survivor (disambiguation)
