= The Survivalist =

The Survivalist may refer to:

- The Survivalist (2015 film), a British thriller directed by Stephen Fingleton
- The Survivalist (2021 film), an American thriller directed by Jon Keeyes
- The Survivalist (novel series), 29 novels by Jerry Ahern

== See also ==
- Survivalism (disambiguation)
