= Supernatural season 10 =

Supernatural
- Season 10
- DVD cover art
- Showrunner: Jeremy Carver
- Starring: Jared Padalecki; Jensen Ackles; Misha Collins; Mark A. Sheppard
- No. of episodes: 23

Release
- Original network: The CW
- Original release: October 7, 2014 – May 20, 2015

Season chronology
- ← Previous; Season 9 Next → Season 11

The tenth season of Supernatural, an American dark fantasy television series created by Eric Kripke, premiered on October 7, 2014 on The CW, and concluded on May 20, 2015, consisting of 23 episodes. The season aired Tuesdays at 9:00 p.m. (ET), and moved to Wednesdays at 9:00 p.m. beginning March 18, 2015. This is the third season with Jeremy Carver as showrunner. The season was released on DVD and Blu-ray in region 1 on September 8, 2015. The tenth season had an average viewership of 2.02 million U.S. viewers. The season follows Sam and Dean as Dean deals with the after effects of the Mark of Cain, using The First Blade, and becomes a demon. The brothers try to escape the curse, while dealing with a family of murderers and Cain himself.

== Cast ==
=== Starring ===
- Jared Padalecki as Sam Winchester
- Jensen Ackles as Dean Winchester
- Misha Collins as Castiel / Jimmy Novak (Note: Only credited for their respective episode appearances.)
- Mark A. Sheppard as Crowley

=== Special appearance by ===
- Rob Benedict as Chuck Shurley / God
- Jim Beaver as Bobby Singer

=== Guest stars ===
- Ruth Connell as Rowena MacLeod
- Curtis Armstrong as Metatron
- Erica Carroll as Hannah / Caroline Johnson
- Travis Aaron Wade as Cole Trenton
- Felicia Day as Charlie Bradbury
- Kathryn Newton as Claire Novak
- David Hoflin as Eldon Styne
- Jud Tylor as Adina
- Briana Buckmaster as Sheriff Donna Hanscum
- Dylan Everett as Young Dean Winchester
- Ty Olsson as Benny Lafitte
- Timothy Omundson as Cain
- Kim Rhodes as Sheriff Jody Mills
- Julian Richings as Death

== Episodes ==
A special titled "A Very Special Supernatural Special" aired on October 6, 2014, narrated by Rob Benedict and received 1.07 million viewers.

No. overall	No. in season	Title	Directed by	Written by	Original release date	Prod. code	U.S. viewers (millions)
196	1	"Black"	Robert Singer	Jeremy Carver	October 7, 2014	4X5802	2.50
In the six weeks that have passed since the ending of the ninth season, the now-demonic Dean (Jensen Ackles) has been living it up with his new friend Crowley (Mark A. Sheppard)—partying at bars, singing bad karaoke, and go to play foosball with Crowley. Meanwhile, Sam (Jared Padalecki), oblivious to Dean's state, has been searching desperately for his missing brother. He eventually finds out the truth from Crowley after investigating the death of an Abaddon loyalist whom Crowley had purposefully sent to his death by attacking Dean. Crowley confesses that he has been sending Abaddon loyalists after Dean to sate Dean's bloodlust. Sam tracks Dean and Crowley to Beulah, North Dakota, but gets ambushed by an unknown man (Travis Aaron Wade) who is also looking for Dean. Dean gets a call from the man, who demands that Dean trade himself for Sam's life. However, Dean doesn't care about his brother anymore, refuses the deal, and hangs up, leaving Sam in the kidnapper's hands. Elsewhere, a dying Castiel (Misha Collins) is approached by Hannah (Erica Carroll), one of his followers in the previous season, for help tracking down Daniel and Adina (Jud Tylor), two rogue angels who refuse to return to the restored Heaven, instead wanting the freedom that life on Earth gives them. While Castiel is understanding towards the couple, Hannah is not, and a fight ensues that results in Castiel having to kill Daniel to save Hannah. Afterward, Hannah reveals that she doesn't like the idea of angels taking on human values, as she fears it would lead to chaos. Castiel, however, thinks it's a good idea.
197	2	"Reichenbach"	Thomas J. Wright	Andrew Dabb	October 14, 2014	4X5803	2.13
Sam's kidnapper reveals that his name is Cole and the reason he's hunting Dean down is because Dean killed his father twelve years ago. He tries to torture Sam for Dean's location, but Sam escapes after warning Cole that Dean is a monster. It is later revealed that Cole has let him escape, and follows him to Dean. Meanwhile, Crowley and Dean have a falling out after Dean refuses to follow Crowley's orders and embarrasses him in front of his demon subjects. Realizing that the situation has gotten out of his control, Crowley contacts Sam with Dean's whereabouts to have Sam handle his brother. Sam offers to help Dean become human again, but Dean is uninterested, having found a kind of liberty in being a demon and in not caring anymore. Cole then ambushes the brothers and takes Dean on in a fight, but is easily defeated. Dean leaves him alive so that he will have to live with the shame of having been unable to avenge his father. Sam seizes the opportunity to capture the distracted Dean. In return for Crowley's help, Sam gives him the First Blade. Cole, having learned about Dean's demonic nature, starts researching the supernatural, still determined to take revenge on Dean. Elsewhere, Hannah goes to visit Metatron (Curtis Armstrong) in his prison, in the hopes of making a deal to save Castiel's life, but Castiel manages to stop her, insisting that she respect his choice not to save himself through evil means.
198	3	"Soul Survivor"	Jensen Ackles	Brad Buckner & Eugenie Ross-Leming	October 21, 2014	4X5801	2.08
Castiel and Hannah continue their journey towards the bunker with Castiel growing weaker all the time. At a gas station, they are attacked by a vengeful Adina, and a weakened Castiel is left near-death. Before Adina can kill the two angels, Crowley, having problems with ruling Hell due to his time with Dean, kills Adina and steals her grace. Crowley gives a reluctant Castiel Adina's grace, restoring him to full strength. In return, Crowley asks Castiel to deal with Dean. Having captured Dean, Sam begins the process of curing him using the ritual they discovered a year and a half before. As the ritual goes on, Dean taunts Sam over his desperate attempts to find him, including tricking a man into selling his soul so he could interrogate a crossroads demon. Unbeknownst to Sam, the ritual makes Dean human enough that he is able to escape, and he stalks Sam throughout the bunker. However, Castiel finally arrives and subdues Dean. They are able to successfully complete the ritual and Dean is returned to being human, but retains the Mark of Cain. Castiel suggests that a guilty-feeling Dean take some time off as things are quiet, however, in Tulsa, Oklahoma, a mysterious red-haired woman (Ruth Connell) sits in a hotel room under two men staked to the ceiling.
199	4	"Paper Moon"	Jeannot Szwarc	Adam Glass	October 28, 2014	4X5804	1.93
Following Dean becoming human again, he and Sam have taken a break from hunting, until they find what seems to be a werewolf case in Durham, Washington. Investigating, they find Kate, the werewolf they had let go two years previously, and believe her to be the killer. As they prepare to kill her, they get a call that there is another murder that Kate couldn't have committed, meaning another werewolf is responsible. Sam and Dean trace Kate's last call and discover that the real killer is Kate's sister Tasha, whom Kate had turned, in order to keep her from dying of fatal injuries from a car crash. Unlike Kate, Tasha has embraced her monstrous instincts and started killing. Dean tricks Kate into leading them to her sister, but Tasha reveals that she now has a "pack" consisting of two men she has turned, and has the boys captured. She invites Kate to join the pack as well if Kate kills Sam and Dean, but Kate refuses. Realizing that the sister she knew is lost to her, Kate kills Tasha before making her escape. Sam and Dean kill the two remaining werewolves. At the end of the episode, Dean accepts that he's not ready to get back into hunting yet, but feels he has to, as he wants to do good after doing so much bad.
200	5	"Fan Fiction"	Phil Sgriccia	Robbie Thompson	November 11, 2014	4X5805	2.17
Still fixed on going out on hunts, Dean insists that he and Sam look into the disappearance of a teacher in Flint, Michigan. They are shocked to discover that the school musical that the teacher had been planning to shut down is based on the books that they'd discovered in the fourth season which had been written about their lives by former prophet Chuck Shurley. When a student also disappears after she, too, quit with plans to shut down the musical, Sam and Dean eventually realize that the goddess Calliope is behind this as she wants the musical to be completed, at which point she will eat the writer, Marie. When trying to catch Calliope before she can get Marie, Sam gets captured by her. Meanwhile, Dean must battle a scarecrow creation of hers. Sam is able to kill Calliope with the help of the student and the teacher she had kidnapped, causing her and her scarecrow to explode. The latter explosion is witnessed by the audience, who applauds, believing that it to be special effects. Marie gives Dean a prop version of his old amulet, a symbol of his brotherhood with Sam, which he had thrown away in the fifth season when he had lost faith in Sam. Dean ends up hanging it on the Impala's mirror. After the brothers leave, Marie is greeted by Chuck (Rob Benedict) who congratulates her on the musical.
201	6	"Ask Jeeves"	John MacCarthy	Eric Carmelo & Nicole Snyder	November 18, 2014	4X5806	2.54
Finding Bobby's old cellphone in the Impala, Dean discovers he has inherited something from a rich heiress in New Canaan, Connecticut, and he and Sam decide to claim it as his next of kin. However, they get caught up in a murder mystery when what appears to be the ghosts of the heiress and her long-dead husband start murdering people. Things get complicated when they discover they aren't dealing with ghosts, but a shape-shifter. After a cop is murdered, Sam and Dean become the prime suspects and are locked up. Meanwhile, the maid Olivia reveals herself to be the shape-shifter. She explains she is the heiress' illegitimate daughter from an affair with a shape-shifter. Her real father tried to claim her but was killed by Bobby, who agreed to spare Olivia in exchange for her being locked up for everyone's safety. Bobby was to take care of Olivia if anything happened to her mother. After the death of her mother, her butler, the only other one to know the truth, released Olivia out of pity and gave her a job as a maid. However, she is disgusted with her family's greed and wants them dead. Sam and Dean manage to break free and Sam and Olivia engage in a deadly game of cat and mouse which ends when Dean shoots her dead while she's distracted. However, possibly under the influence of the Mark of Cain, Dean unloads several more rounds into her body, worrying Sam. The family agrees to keep the Winchesters' presence a secret and Sam and Dean find out that Bobby only inherited the key to the attic where Olivia was locked up.
202	7	"Girls, Girls, Girls"	Robert Singer	Robert Berens	November 25, 2014	4X5807	2.30
After Dean discovers his date from a dating app is helping demons make deals, Sam and Dean investigate a demonic brothel. Before they can get there, the witch Rowena gets there first and kills Raoul, the demon in charge and recruits the hookers as her apprentices. She explains that she was thrown out of the Grand Coven a long time ago and now wants to regain her power. Sam and Dean track her to a fancy hotel, but have to face Crowley's demons and one of the girls after Crowley catches up before they can. Dean captures Rowena, but is confronted by Cole who forces Dean to let her go. Dean defeats Cole but instead of killing him, tells him the truth about what happened: Cole's father was an unknown type of monster Dean had been hunting who had been eating livers. Cole is reluctant to accept the truth, but Dean convinces him to let go of his vendetta and return to his family. At the same time, Castiel and Hannah continue to track down rogue angels but are found by the husband of Hannah's vessel, Caroline. Hannah decides to return to Heaven so Caroline can return to her family and Castiel brings her home and looks up his own vessel. While Rowena escaped Sam and Dean, demons working for Crowley catch her and he is shocked to see her, as Rowena is his mother.
203	8	"Hibbing 911"	Tim Andrew	Story by : Jenny Klein & Phil Sgriccia; Teleplay by : Jenny Klein	December 2, 2014	4X5808	2.33
Sheriff Jody Mills (Kim Rhodes) goes to a sheriff's retreat in Hibbing, Minnesota where she meets Sheriff Donna Hanscum (from "The Purge") who is overeager and friendly. However, bodies start appearing with everything eaten and Jody calls in Sam and Dean while investigating herself with help from a clueless Donna. Donna finds out the truth after finding local sheriff, Len, standing over another cop with vampire fangs out. Sam and Dean learn that Len has been hiding evidence of the strange murders and are forced to tell Donna the truth. With Donna's help, the Winchesters track Len to a farmhouse where they are captured by a group of vampires led by Star. Star explains that Len used to be their leader who taught them to consume everything, not just blood before growing a conscience and working to protect humans instead of hurting them. After Len refuses to kill the hunters, Star kills him, but Dean manages to break free and kill two of the three vampires. Donna breaks free as well and kills Star when she tries to harm Jody. Afterwards, Jody offers to teach Donna about hunting while Dean tells Sam that for once it felt like the Mark of Cain wasn't fueling his actions, that he was himself for the first time in a while.
204	9	"The Things We Left Behind"	Guy Norman Bee	Andrew Dabb	December 9, 2014	4X5809	2.62
Feeling guilty about what he did to his vessel and his family, Castiel tracks down Claire Novak in a group home in Pontiac, Illinois. He breaks her out, but she runs off, so he calls in Sam and Dean to help locate her. They find her trying to rob a convenience store to help the man she lives with, Randy, pay off his debts to a loan shark. After blaming Castiel for everything that's happened to her, Claire runs off to Randy, who sells her to the loan shark to settle his debts. Castiel rescues her, but under the influence of the Mark of Cain, Dean slaughters Randy, the loan shark, and all his men, something he previously had a nightmare about. At the same time, Rowena attempts to reach out to Crowley, failing until she turns him against one of his own men and Crowley kills him to save her.
205	10	"The Hunter Games"	John Badham	Eugenie Ross-Leming & Brad Buckner	January 20, 2015	4X5811	2.42
Needing to get the Mark of Cain off of Dean, Castiel has Metatron brought down from Heaven so that he and the Winchesters can question him, seeing Metatron's knowledge as their only hope. Metatron agrees to tell them and tells them that they need the First Blade which Crowley has hidden. Sam and Dean meet with Crowley who reluctantly agrees to retrieve the Blade from a crypt in Guam, but later tells them that he will only give it to them once they have the rest of the spell. Dean demands Metatron give them the rest, but he states that he will want something for each bit of information and there is a lot. Metatron taunts Dean into attacking him, causing him to fall further and further under the Mark's influence. Dean comes close to killing Metatron, but is stopped by Sam and Castiel who takes Metatron back to Heaven rather than risk his life. However, Metatron leaves a possible clue for them to mull over: "the river ends at the source." Sam suggests that part of beating the Mark's power involves Dean actually fighting it like Cain did rather than embracing it. At the same time, Rowena plots against Crowley, using a spell to induce a nightmare and spy on Crowley's meeting with the Winchesters. Rowena sends a demon named Gothrey to get the First Blade then kills him, but when Crowley walks in on her, she twists the situation to her advantage, making him suspicious of the Winchesters and causing him not to give them the Blade. During this time, Castiel tries to help the daughter of his vessel, Claire Novak, but she refuses his help and meets up with a couple who suggest she kill Dean since he was responsible for the deaths of both her fathers. Claire lures Dean into a trap, but ultimately can't go through with it and warns him of the attack. Dean defeats the couple, but rather than give into the Mark's rage, lets them go. Castiel later finds Claire who has decided to find a new life away from him, but promises to keep in touch.
206	11	"There's No Place Like Home"	Phil Sgriccia	Robbie Thompson	January 27, 2015	4X5810	2.06
While looking for clues on how to remove the Mark of Cain, Sam finds a video of Charlie Bradbury (Felicia Day) beating a district attorney. Believing that Charlie may be working a case as this was not the only person she attacked, Sam and Dean investigate and discover that the DA was involved in a cover-up of the deaths of Charlie's parents in a drunk driving crash. Tracing a woman involved, they find a dark Charlie who flees after slashing the Impala's tire and beating up Dean. To their surprise, another Charlie shows up and explains that in order to win the war in Oz, she made a deal with the Wizard of Oz to split herself into her good and dark sides. Killing Dark Charlie will kill her; she can't return to Oz to ask the Wizard for help, as Dark Charlie broke the Key to Oz. Sam and Charlie investigate the Key for a way to fix it, while Dean tries to protect Russell Wellington (Barclay Hope), the man who killed Charlie's parents. However, Dark Charlie tricks Dean and kills Russell anyway. She then leaves with the Impala to find Sam and Charlie, as they discover a former Man of Letters named Clive Dylan who could help them. Clive helps them summon the Wizard who is his dark side, so they can force the Wizard to reverse the split. While Sam and Charlie confront the Wizard, Dean fights Dark Charlie and brutally beats her. In order to stop the Wizard, Charlie kills Clive which kills the Wizard too. Sam stops Dean from killing Dark Charlie and they are able to reverse the split. In the aftermath, Charlie is unable to return to Oz and so dedicates herself to helping get rid of the Mark of Cain, forgiving Dean for his actions. However, he refuses to forgive himself.
207	12	"About a Boy"	Serge Ladouceur	Adam Glass	February 3, 2015	4X5812	2.21
Dean locks himself in the Bunker for a week researching the Mark of Cain, until Sam convinces him to investigate a case in Pendleton, Oregon where a man disappeared in a flash of light. While at the bar looking for clues, Dean meets a woman named Tina who he spends the day talking to. When Tina leaves, he notices a man following her, then she too disappears in a flash of light. When Dean investigates, the man uses a hex bag on him. Dean then finds himself locked in a cell and at the age of fourteen (Dylan Everett) with a teenage Tina in the cell next to him. With the help of Tina, Dean escapes and returns to a stunned Sam, who has determined that they are dealing with a witch after finding yarrow at the bar where Dean disappeared. Sam and Dean return to the witch's house where they find Tina gone, and they capture the man who reveals himself to be Hansel of Hansel and Gretel (Mark Acheson). He explains that Hansel and Gretel was a true story, only the story had a happy ending, while in reality he was forced to help the witch Katja (Lesley Nicol) eat children for centuries and eat Gretel's heart when they tried to escape. Hansel tells them how to reverse the spell and offers his help in stopping Katja. However, when Sam and Dean try to kill her as she prepares to eat Tina, Hansel reveals himself as evil and disarms them. They are stunned when Katja reveals that she has been sent by the Grand Coven to stop Rowena, but they fight her and Hansel before they can learn anymore. They lose, but Dean manages to get Hansel's hex bag and reverse the spell on himself. Returned to his usual self, Dean quickly kills Hansel and cooks Katja in her own oven. Afterwards, they are unable to revert Tina to normal as the hex bag burned with Katja. However, when the brothers offer to recreate the spell for her, Tina refuses, as she sees this as a second chance since she has so far had a bad life. After dropping Tina off at the bus station, Sam and Dean contemplate the information about the Grand Coven and the return of the Mark, which had disappeared when Dean was a teenager.
208	13	"Halt & Catch Fire"	John F. Showalter	Eric Charmelo & Nicole Snyder	February 10, 2015	4X5813	1.98
Sam and Dean investigate a case in Spencer, Iowa where a truck mysteriously drove itself off a bridge, killing its driver, Billy. Believing it to be the ghost of Billy's dead brother, Sam and Dean salt and burn the truck, but soon afterwards, a girl named Julie is strangled by her own computer cord after getting threatening messages on the Internet. Following the clues in the message leads them to a man named Andrew Silver who died in a car crash, but they are unable to put him to rest as he was cremated and doesn't seem to be attached to anything. After a boy named Kyle is killed, they confront his friend Delilah who reveals that the four were involved in the crash where they caused the crash and didn't try to save Andrew after his car was set on fire by electrical wires. Sam and Dean realize that Andrew is after revenge and is in the Internet, having used the power wires to access a nearby Wi-Fi tower when he was killed. Dean protects Delilah from Andrew while Sam talks to his wife, Corey, who admits she knew he was there and didn't want to let him go. When Dean is unable to stop Andrew or convince him to move on, Corey speaks to him through FaceTime and convinces Andrew to let go of his revenge and be at peace. Afterwards, Delilah visits Corey to tell her what really happened to her husband. Meanwhile, Dean decides that while he won't give up fighting the Mark of Cain, but he won't continue looking for a cure.
209	14	"The Executioner's Song"	Phil Sgriccia	Robert Berens	February 17, 2015	4X5814	2.09
Sam and Dean learn that Cain has kidnapped a serial killer named Tommy Tolliver while at the same time, Castiel discovers a graveyard full of Cain's victims. Cain confronts Castiel, revealing that he has fallen back under the influence of the Mark of Cain and is now slaughtering his descendants, thinking his bloodline is tainted. In order to stop Cain, Dean calls upon Crowley to give him the First Blade, lying to him that Cain wants Crowley dead. As a result, Crowley blows off his mother Rowena's wish to kill a witch of the Grand Coven to help the Winchesters. Working together, the four trap Cain in a devil's trap when he arrives to kill his next victim, a twelve-year-old boy. Dean confronts Cain alone who tells him there is no cure for the Mark of Cain, and it's just better to give into its power. Dean and Cain fight, but Dean loses as he holds back in fear of losing his humanity. However, he eventually manages to get the upper hand and asks if Cain will give up killing again. Upon Cain's declaration that he won't, Dean kills him, devastated by the fact that there seems to be no way out for him. Despite his fears, Dean manages to keep control of himself, but gives Castiel the First Blade instead of Crowley as he promised, shocking Crowley with his lies. Rowena later tells Crowley that he's not a king anymore and is nothing but the Winchesters' lap dog. Sam expresses the belief that if Dean could kill Cain himself without losing his humanity there is still hope for him, while he privately tells Castiel that Dean's in trouble.
210	15	"The Things They Carried"	John Badham	Jenny Klein	March 18, 2015	4X5815	1.73
Dean finds a case in Fayetteville, North Carolina where a man named Rick drains a woman of blood and later commits suicide. Suspecting it to be a rugaru or a pagan god, Sam and Dean check it out and find out that a friend of the killer, Kit, is displaying the same symptoms. While investigating, they run into Cole Trenton, the man who had tried to kill Dean who is a friend of Kit and was looking into his actions himself. Reluctantly, the Winchesters and Cole team up together to try to find Kit who displays an unnatural thirst, draining multiple water bottles and killing a man and drinking his blood. Using his contacts, Cole is able to learn that Kit and Rick were recently involved in a rescue mission in Iraq where the man they rescued attacked them and was killed. Cole tracks Kit to a cabin where Kit attacks and infects Cole with a khan worm (from season 6's "And Then There Were None") before running off. Sam and Dean realize that the rescued soldier on Kit and Rick's last mission must have infected them and Sam sets out to track down Kit while Dean tries to save Cole. When electricity doesn't work, Dean and Cole realize that dehydration might and turn the cabin into a sweat lodge. Eventually the worm comes out and Dean kills it, however, Sam is unable to save Kit and kills him in self-defense. Cole returns to his family with a new understanding of what Sam and Dean do and what happened to his father while Sam feels immense guilt for his inability to save Kit.
211	16	"Paint It Black"	John F. Showalter	Brad Buckner & Eugenie Ross-Leming	March 25, 2015	4X5816	1.70
Sam and Dean investigate a case in Worcester, Massachusetts where three men were horribly killed in two weeks, two by suicide and one by his wife murdering him. However, the wife has no memory of the murder so they believe it to be a case of ghost possession, as there is no sign of a demon and it doesn't fit the way they do things. The only connection they can find between the victims is that they all went to confession, so Dean visits confession in hopes of drawing the ghost out. In the process, he admits that although he's always thought he'd die hunting, he feels as though that time is approaching, and he's not ready for it. It's revealed that the ghost is that of a nun named Isabella who in 1520 fell in love with an artist named Piero who didn't love her back, so she was sent to a convent by her family to deal with her grief. Another nun, Sister Mathias, who has been talking with Isabella, overhears Sam and Dean talking about what's been happening. She reads Isabella's journal to learn that Isabella killed Piero after finding him in bed with another woman. She alerts Sam and Dean. Dean orders Sam to burn the journal, believing Isabella to be tied to it, because she was burned at the stake as a witch due to the horrific nature of her crime. While Dean tries to fight off Isabella possessing Sister Mathias, Sam reads the journal and learns that Isabella's blood and part of her finger were used to create the painting Piero made of her. Sam salts and burns the painting, destroying Isabella. Later, Sam tells Dean that he truly believes that there is a cure for the Mark of Cain and they need to keep searching, but Dean is unenthusiastic about it. At the same time, Crowley captures Olivette, High Priestess of the Grand Coven, for Rowena to make her case in order to practice magic freely once more. Olivette reveals that the Grand Coven was devastated by the Men of Letters and is actually very weak now. She explains that the Men of Letters plundered the Coven's spells and potions then hid them in bunkers across the world, and the only known surviving Men of Letters are Sam and Dean. In response, Rowena turns Olivette into a hamster and uses Crowley's relationship with Sam and Dean in hopes of getting at the plunder.
212	17	"Inside Man"	Rashaad Ernesto Green	Andrew Dabb	April 1, 2015	4X5817	1.70
After Dean has a nightmare of all the carnage he has caused under the Mark's influence, Sam searches out a cure on his own with the help of Castiel while lying to Dean about what he is doing. Knowing the only one with possible knowledge of a cure is Metatron, Sam and Castiel attempt to get him from Heaven, but are barred from entering by Hannah (Lee Majdoub) as Metatron is too dangerous to be let loose. Desperate, Sam and Castiel enlist the help of a psychic to contact Bobby Singer (Jim Beaver) in Heaven to break Metatron out. Bobby is able to get Castiel in and Metatron out, but he is last seen being approached by Hannah and several other angels to be punished for his actions. On Earth, Castiel removes Metatron's grace, making him human. Under threat of death, Metatron admits he lied before and is actually unaware of a cure for the Mark. To stop Sam from killing him, Metatron admits that there is some of Castiel's grace left. He offers to lead him to it in exchange for his life. Reluctantly, Castiel agrees and drives off with Metatron to find it. At the same time, Dean cools off in a bar hustling pool, where Rowena attempts to kill him with a spell and three men under her control. Dean is able to beat the men, and the Mark makes him immune to the spell, but he lets her go to save the men's lives. Rowena tries to trick Crowley into killing Dean for her, revealing that the Mark is just an ancient curse, but Dean and Crowley talk instead. Dean helps Crowley realize just how little Rowena means to him, and he kicks her out. Sam and Dean later lie to each other about what they did, and Sam reads a note from Bobby telling him to keep looking and stop lying to each other.
213	18	"Book of the Damned"	P. J. Pesce	Robbie Thompson	April 15, 2015	4X5818	1.76
Charlie contacts Sam and Dean, having found the Book of the Damned. However, she is tracked by Jacob Styne, who is determined to find the book as well, claiming that it belongs to his family. Sam and Dean meet with Charlie and try to translate the book which calls out to Dean to be used. Dean learns from the Men of Letters files that the man and his family are the Styne family, a family who used the book to commit evil acts until it was taken from them a century before. After an encounter with Jacob, Dean orders Sam to burn the book as it's evil and dangerous. Sam appears to burn the book during a fight with Jacob. His family is killed, but not before they warn that other Stynes will never stop until they retrieve the book. It is later revealed that Sam kept the book intact because it's the only chance of removing the Mark of Cain, no matter the consequences. At the same time, Castiel and Metatron search for Castiel's grace, coming under attack by an angry Cupid along the way. Searching for the grace inside a library, Metatron incapacitates Castiel with a spell and takes the demon tablet, what he had really come searching for. However, Castiel manages to recover his grace and is restored to full power though his wings are still broken. Sam and Castiel do not tell Dean that Metatron is on the loose with the tablet. After celebrating Castiel's full return with Dean and Charlie, Sam meets with Rowena, believing her to be the only one capable of translating the book.
214	19	"The Werther Project"	Stefan Pleszczynski	Robert Berens	April 22, 2015	4X5819	1.63
Sam meets with Rowena in hopes of translating the Book of the Damned. Rowena agrees in exchange for Sam killing Crowley for her and reveals that she can't actually read the book, only a dead witch named Nadia could. However, Nadia left behind a decrypting codex, which the Men of Letters took when they killed her. Sam begins a search for the codex and discovers Magnus (Kavan Smith) had hidden it within the Werther Box, a vault that caused whoever tried to open it to kill themselves. Sam tracks the box to St. Louis, Missouri, where he is joined by Dean after attempting to leave him behind. After being barred by Suzie (a woman whose family died in the '70s after she tried to open the box herself), Sam sneaks into the house with Dean's help and tries to disarm the system with a spell. However, he is unsuccessful and unleashes a spell that traps Sam, Dean, and Suzie in hallucinations which try to get them to kill themselves. Suzie does, while Sam is saved by Rowena, whom he teams up with to disarm the box. Sam learns that the only way is for a Man of Letters to spill all of their blood onto the box, which he starts to do to save Dean. At the same time, Dean hallucinates that he is in Purgatory with his old friend Benny (Ty Olsson) who encourages him to kill himself to keep Sam and Castiel from having to do it later. Dean nearly does, but he knows the Mark won't allow him to kill himself and also, he sees through the illusion as the real Benny would never want him to do it, so he kills "Benny", freeing himself from the spell. It is revealed that Sam had been hallucinating Rowena's presence as Dean stops Sam from killing himself and sheds his own blood into the box, breaking the spell and opening it. Sam and Dean get the codex and Dean destroys the box to be sure it's no longer a threat. Sam takes the codex to the real Rowena, but chains her to make sure she only uses the book to get rid of the Mark of Cain.
215	20	"Angel Heart"	Steve Boyum	Robbie Thompson	April 29, 2015	4X5820	1.74
In Tulsa, Oklahoma, Claire is knocked unconscious in an alley while searching for her mother Amelia, and Castiel calls Sam and Dean in to help. After Claire explains what she's trying to do, the Winchesters and Castiel decide to help her with her search. While Sam helps Claire hack her mother's credit card information, Dean and Castiel interrogate Ronnie Cartwright, the man who knocked Claire out. According to Amelia's diary, he was the last person to see her. After Dean gets rough, Ronnie admits he sent Amelia to a faith healer named Peter Holloway who had healed his eyesight. However, he'd quit after seeing that Holloway was up to no good, cutting the people sent to him. After they leave, Ronnie calls Holloway who blinds him once again and kills him. Using this information, Sam is able to track Holloway to a farm house, but leaves Dean and Claire behind due to the Mark of Cain's effects on Dean getting worse. Castiel finds Amelia who is trapped in a dream life where she has reunited with Jimmy. He wakes her but is unable to heal her as she is extremely weak. Sam is captured by Holloway at the same time that Dean and Claire realize he is one of the Grigori, a group of angels that prey upon humans. Holloway, revealing himself as Tamiel, tells Sam that he's been hiding on Earth from the other angels by feeding on human souls since the beginning, seeing both angels and humans as beneath him. Afterwards, Dean, Sam, Castiel and Claire come to Amelia's rescue, but are unable to defeat Tamiel. Amelia sacrifices herself to save Claire, who then kills Tamiel with his own sword in revenge. Amelia is reunited with her husband Jimmy in Heaven while the Winchesters decide to send Claire to Jody until she can get on her feet. Claire finally forgives Dean and Castiel for their roles in her father's death and Dean leaves her with a lore book as a gift, as he realizes she is intending to become a hunter.
216	21	"Dark Dynasty"	Robert Singer	Eugenie Ross-Leming & Brad Buckner	May 6, 2015	4X5823	1.45
Wanting to get the Book of the Damned back, Monroe Styne sends his son, Eldon, to track down Sam and Dean to find it. Eldon and another family member ambush Dean, but he manages to kill the other family member and capture Eldon. Eldon explains to Dean that the Styne family has existed for thousands of years, and they harvest organs to transplant into themselves to make them superhuman. The Stynes cause, and take advantage of, various disasters in history to make a profit including Adolf Hitler's rise to power and the September 11 attacks. The family is worldwide and was formerly known by the name of Frankenstein before Mary Shelley discovered their secrets and wrote a book about it. Dean goes to confront Sam after Eldon reveals that the Book of the Damned can't be destroyed. Eldon escapes by ripping off his own arm. At the same time, Crowley searches for his missing mother with help from Olivette. Sam, Rowena, Castiel, and Charlie work on decoding the Book. After having too much of Rowena, Charlie leaves to have peace and quiet, and ends up in a motel. However, right as she finally breaks the code, she gets attacked by Eldon. Sam and Dean, who has finally learned the truth, tell Charlie to give Eldon what he wants, but she destroys her computer instead of letting Eldon get her notes. Shortly afterwards, Sam and Dean find her dead, murdered by Eldon. However, as her last act, Charlie emailed them her notes on how to break the code so they could finish her work.
217	22	"The Prisoner"	Thomas J. Wright	Andrew Dabb	May 13, 2015	4X5821	1.75
Dean and Sam give Charlie a hunter's burial, with Dean blaming Sam for her death and asking Sam to abandon his search for the cure for the Mark. Dean goes in search of the Styne family to kill them all, while Sam discovers that Charlie gave him the Codex that Rowena can use to read it; Rowena asks Sam to kill Crowley before reading it. Dean is caught by the Stynes, and as they prepare to cut him up, Dean kills them all and heads to the bunker. Sam tricks Crowley and shoots him with a trick shot, but Crowley stalls, steals the shot, and escapes. In the bunker, Dean mercilessly kills two Stynes, one of them a good person who didn't want to be like his family. Castiel asks him to abandon his mission to kill the Stynes, leading to a fight in which Dean brutally defeats Castiel and spares his life.
218	23	"Brother's Keeper"	Phil Sgriccia	Jeremy Carver	May 20, 2015	4X5822	1.73
Dean continues to hunt, but the Mark affects him to the point that he gets another hunter killed. Realizing he's gone too far, Dean summons Death (Julian Richings) to kill him before he hurts anyone else. Death explains that the Mark is the lock on the prison of an ancient evil called the Darkness and if the Mark is removed without being passed on, the Darkness will be released. He agrees to transport Dean far away in exchange for him killing Sam so Sam won't try to rescue him. Dean calls Sam and explains that he feels that they are evil and ridding the world of both of them is for the greater good. Sam eventually agrees, but reminds Dean of how good he is and his love for his family. At the last moment, instead of killing Sam, Dean turns Death's scythe on its owner, seemingly killing Death instead. At the same time, Rowena agrees to remove the Mark from Dean's arm in exchange for her freedom and Castiel calls on Crowley to get the necessary ingredients. One of these proves to be a young man who Rowena cares deeply about and she has to sacrifice for the spell. Unaware of the consequences, Rowena casts the spell and the Mark is removed, but she escapes, casting a spell on Castiel that causes him to attack Crowley. With the Mark gone, the Darkness is released into the world and washes over the Impala as the Winchesters desperately try to escape it.

== Production ==
Supernatural was renewed for a tenth season on February 12, 2014, after undergoing an 88% spike in viewership during its ninth season. Mark A. Sheppard, who had been recurring on the show since season 5 as Crowley, was promoted to series regular.

== Reception ==
The review aggregator website Rotten Tomatoes reported a 100% approval rating for Supernatural's tenth season, with an average rating of 7.7/10 based on 8 reviews.
