= Black (Supernatural) =

- Supernatural episode
- Episode no.: Season 10; Episode 1
- Directed by: Robert Singer
- Written by: Jeremy Carver
- Cinematography by: Serge Ladouceur
- Editing by: Nicole Baer
- Production code: 4X5802
- Original air date: October 7, 2014
- Running time: 39 minutes

Guest appearances
- Erica Carroll as Hannah; Travis Aaron Wade as Cole Trenton; Emily Fonda as Ann Marie; Jud Tylor as Adina

Episode chronology
← Previous "Do You Believe in Miracles?"	Next → "Reichenbach"
- Supernatural season 10

"Black" is the first episode of the paranormal drama television series Supernatural's season 10, and the 196th overall. The episode was written by showrunner Jeremy Carver and directed by executive producer Robert Singer. It was first broadcast on October 7, 2014, on The CW. In the episode, Sam begins looking for Dean and Crowley after discovered Dean returned to life as a demon. Meanwhile, Castiel is dealing with his dying grace while Hannah asks him for help in a mission.

The episode received critical acclaim, with critics praising the new character development for Dean.

== Plot ==
6 weeks after the previous episode, Sam (Jared Padalecki) has been torturing demons to find the whereabouts of Dean (Jensen Ackles) and Crowley (Mark A. Sheppard). Dean hung out with his new friend Crowley and sang bad karaoke, then attacked the waitress' boyfriend when he appeared to insult her.

Sam finds some evidence from the murder of Drew Neely and gets help from the sheriff to discover that Neely was killed attacking a man: Dean. He uses the cameras to discovers Dean's black eyes, thinking that Dean is dead and Crowley used a demon to possess him. He retrieves Neely's phone and discovers that he was sent by Crowley to kill Dean. He calls Crowley to confront him over Dean's death, but Crowley states that the Mark of Cain couldn't let Dean die, and he is now a demon.

Castiel (Misha Collins), who is suffering from the effects of his dying grace, is approached by Hannah (Erica Carroll) to help her find two rogue angels, Daniel and Adina, who preferred to stay on Earth as they had more freedom from the angels and Heaven. When Daniel tries to kill Hannah, Castiel is forced to kill him. While leaving, Hannah states that she doesn't like the idea of angels taking on human values, as she fears it would lead to chaos. But Castiel thinks it's a good idea.

Dean's attitude continues to be a problem for Crowley, who has been sending Abaddon's loyalists after Dean so he could kill them. Sam is suddenly attacked and kidnapped by a man, Cole Trenton (Travis Aaron Wade), who tortures him to get Dean's location. Cole calls Dean to tell him that if he wants Sam alive, he needs to meet with him. However, Dean refuses, stating that whatever Sam does, is his fault. But he states to Cole that if he kills Sam, then Dean will find him and kill him, claiming he's a man of a word.

== Reception ==
=== Viewers ===
The episode was watched by 2.50 million viewers with a 1.1/3 share among adults aged 18 to 49. This was an 8% increase in viewership from the previous episode, which was watched by 2.30 million viewers; but was a 4% decrease in viewership from the previous season premiere, which was watched by 2.59 million viewers. This means that 1.1 percent of all households with televisions watched the episode, while 3 percent of all households watching television at that time watched it. Supernatural ranked as the second most watched program on The CW in the day, behind The Flash.

=== Critical reviews ===
Professional ratings
Review scores
Source	Rating
IGN	8.5
TV Fanatic	4.5/5.0 stars

"Black" received critical acclaim. Amy Ratcliffe of IGN gave the episode a "great" 8.5 out of 10 and wrote in his verdict, "The Season 10 premiere of Supernatural excelled at presenting a roller coaster of emotions; in the course of an hour, it basically represented all of Supernatural's different sides from funny to terrifying to heartbreaking. It didn't back away from the impact Dean's change has on the story, and while the Winchesters are still at the core of the story, it seems like their separation might be what makes the season strong."

Hunter Bishop of TV Overmind, wrote, "I really hope that Demon-Dean is different from regular Dean. I really hope that his worst impulses are directed outwards against others instead of rebounding inwards. His self-loathing should turn into arrogance; it’s a fine line between those two anyways. Mainly, I want to see Demon!Dean do something different. I want Sam to have some agency. I want Castiel to sack up and give Heaven the middle finger. But as much as I complain, I'm glad the show is back. It's still crazy entertaining and engaging. Familiarity is much better than loneliness, and this show brings with it a community that is unbreakable, fearless, idiotic, and more than a little bit neurotic. But it's a family; and I’m glad to be back in the middle of it all."

Samantha Highfill of EW stated: "The thing that Supernatural does better than probably any other show on television right now — and therefore one of the main reasons it's starting season 10 — is taking what is a very dramatic story and having fun with it. This show doesn't take itself too seriously, and that is why it's successful. For example, this premiere could've been incredibly dark. After nine years of saving people and hunting things, Dean became the thing he hunts. No, he isn't possessed by a demon. He is a demon. Okay, so that's pretty depressing, but it's not nearly as bad as it could've been. I mean, he could've been in West Virginia. All jokes aside, this premiere was everything fans have come to know and love about a Supernatural episode. There was humor — mostly thanks to Dean and Crowley — while precious, precious Sam held down the dramatic fort. (Literally, he's been holding down things in the Winchester bunker for six weeks.) And then, thanks to Cole, the newest cast addition — who sounds freakishly like Josh Lucas — we've got just enough new intrigue. If this episode were a recipe, well, it'd create one delicious bacon cheeseburger."

Sean McKenna from TV Fanatic, gave a 4.5 star rating out of 5, stating: "That said, I'm thoroughly invested again in the series, the possibilities seem exciting, and the way the focus really locked in on the characters is always a plus. Especially, seeing as the changes to them and their world are dramatically different from when Sam and Dean first started their journey in the pilot. It's safe to say that Supernatural Season 10 has hit the ground the running, and the series still has plenty of gas left in its tank. Another round in the Impala we go."
