= That! Medical Quiz Show =

- Genre: Quiz show
- Running time: 30 minutes
- Country of origin: United States
- Language: English
- Home station: KUAR
- Syndicates: NPR, PRX, WRFA, SoundCloud
- Hosted by: Dr. T. Glenn Pait, Lisa Cornwel
- Created by: David Gold, T. Glenn Pait
- Executive producer: David Gold
- Original release: March 2012

That! Medical Quiz Show is a half-hour radio quiz show hosted by Dr. T. Glenn Pait and co-hosted by Lisa Cornwell that quizzes contestants on medically related issues and topics. It is produced in the US and broadcasts online and on various NPR affiliate stations.

== Format ==
That! Medical Quiz Show is a studio produced radio show, featuring three contestants per show who are quizzed by host Dr. T. Glenn Pait and co-host Lisa Cornwell. Contestants are usually not experienced in the medical field. After introductions, the first featured round begins, which differs every broadcast. There are a total of four rounds and all contestants have the chance to answer one question per round worth one point each and then a bonus round worth two points follows. Whoever accumulates the most points after the final and fast-paced bonus round, "Cardiac Capper," receives a gag prize. The playful gag prizes have ranged from alligator wrestling lessons to items like Dr. Pait's special pocket protector. Lisa then asks for a question for Dr. Pait to pull out of his "That! Medical Quiz Bag." He concludes each show with the catchphrase: "Until next time, remember that more medical knowledge means better health...because there's a little bit of doctor in all of us.™"

== Rounds ==
There are four rounds and all contestants have a chance to answer one question per round worth one point each. Dr. Pait asks the question and gives the contestants three choices to choose from. Each round has a specific sound effect which provides a quirky feel to the show.

=== It's all in the Brain ===
Focuses on questions about the brain.

=== Bread & Brawn ===
Deals with nutrition and exercise.

=== Gross Anatomy ===
Covers gross medical topics.

=== Body Shop ===
Concerns the anatomy of the human body.

=== Medical Disorders ===
Explores the potential maladies that can sometimes befall the human race.

== Bonus rounds ==
Bonus rounds are after every round for two points. Depending on the type of bonus round, contestants can buzz in if their peers answer incorrectly.

=== Medical Myths ===
Includes a statement and contestants determine whether it is a medical myth or truth.

=== Survival Skills ===
Concerns potentially dangerous situations that can occur at home, work, or in the great outdoors.

=== Inside the Trainer's Corner ===
A new round introduced in Season 2 of the show to address topics of sport related injuries or athletes who have been injured.

=== The Lub Dub Pump ===
A variety of topics covering the cardiovascular system.

=== Doctor vs. Quack ===
Dr. Pait makes a statement and contestants determine if the statement he makes is one a real doctor would make or that would come from a phony doctor, a quack.

=== Ultra Sounds ===
The show plays a medically related sound, something contestants might hear in a hospital, a doctor's office, or in the human body. Contestants try to identify sounds that range from a whooping cough to the squeaky wheels of a hospital bed.

=== Illnesses of the Rich and Famous ===
Dr. Pait reads a description of a medical condition that has affected a public figure. Contestants will have to determine which disorder is described from the choices presented.

=== Cardiac Capper ===
A "lightning round" of five fast-paced True or False questions or statements.
