= Sole Survivor =

A sole survivor is a person who is the only survivor of a deadly incident.

Sole Survivor may refer to:

== Film and television ==
- Sole Survivor (1970 film), an American television film starring Vince Edwards, Richard Basehart and William Shatner
- Sole Survivor (1984 film), an American horror film by Thom Eberhardt
- Sole Survivor (2000 film), an American television film based on the 1997 novel of the same title by Dean Koontz (see below)
- Sole Survivor (2013 film), an American documentary film
- Sole Survivor, a title conferred on any winner of the reality television show Survivor
- "Sole Survivors" (Sliders), a 1997 TV episode

== Other media ==
- Sole Survivor (novel), a 1997 novel by Dean Koontz
- "Sole Survivor" (Asia song), released in 1982
- "Sole Survivor" (Helloween song), released in 1995
- "Sole Survivor", a song by Blue Öyster Cult from the 1981 album Fire of Unknown Origin
- Command & Conquer: Sole Survivor, a computer game in the Command & Conquer: Tiberian series
- The player character in Fallout 4 is canonically referred to as the Sole Survivor

== See also ==
- Endling, a sole survivor of a species
- List of aviation accidents and incidents with a sole survivor
- Lone Survivor (disambiguation)
- Sole (disambiguation)
- Sole Survivor Policy, a United States military policy
- Soul Survivor (disambiguation)
- Surviving (disambiguation)
- Survivor (disambiguation)
