= Lone Survivor (disambiguation) =

Lone Survivor is a 2013 war film based on the Marcus Luttrell book.

Lone Survivor may also refer to:

- Lone Survivor (book), a 2007 book by Marcus Luttrell with Patrick Robinson
  - Lone Survivor Foundation, an organization founded by Marcus Luttrell
- Lone Survivor (video game), a 2012 survival horror video game, unrelated to the book and film
- A single indigenous man in Brazil, commonly called the "Man of the Hole", who was the last survivor of his tribe

== See also ==
- Sole Survivor (disambiguation)
- Survivor (disambiguation)
- Surviving (disambiguation)
- Lone (disambiguation)
