= Vivant (disambiguation) =

Vivants is French for the living.

Vivants, Vivantes, Vivant, Vivante, or variation, may refer to:

== People ==
- Vivant Denon (1747–1825), French artist and statesman
- Pierre Abel Clarin Vivant (1855–1914), French historian and journalist
- Arturo Vivante (1923–2008), Italian-American author

== Groups, organizations, companies ==
- Vivant, Belgian political party
- Vivantes Hospital Group, Berlin, Germany
- Vivante Corporation, U.S. fabless semiconductor company

== Other uses ==
- Chevrolet Vivant, a compact MPV/minivan
- Vivante (album), a 2021 album by Amel Bent
- Vivant (Japanese drama), a 2023 TBS Japanese drama starring Masato Sakai

== See also ==
- Abbey of Saint Vivant, origin of the AOC Romanée-Saint-Vivant
- Survivants (disambiguation)
