= Reichenbach (Supernatural) =

- Supernatural episode
- Episode no.: Season 10; Episode 2
- Directed by: Thomas J. Wright
- Written by: Andrew Dabb
- Cinematography by: Serge Ladouceur
- Editing by: James Pickel
- Production code: 4X5803
- Original air date: October 14, 2014
- Running time: 41 minutes

Guest appearances
- Curtis Armstrong as Metatron; Erica Carroll as Hannah; Travis Aaron Wade as Cole Trenton

Episode chronology
← Previous "Black"	Next → "Soul Survivor"
- Supernatural season 10

"Reichenbach" is the second episode of the paranormal drama television series Supernatural's season 10, and the 197th overall. The episode was written by co-executive producer Andrew Dabb and directed by Thomas J. Wright. It was first broadcast on October 14, 2014 on The CW. In the episode, Sam escapes from his captor, Cole Trenton, who is holding a vendetta against Dean for something that happened 12 years ago while Crowley begins to lose control of Dean. Meanwhile, Hannah notices Castiel's health and decides to ask Metatron for help.

== Plot ==
Sam (Jared Padalecki) is told by Cole (Travis Aaron Wade) that on June 21, 2003, Cole woke up in the night to see Dean (Jensen Ackles) kill his father, the reason why he wants to kill Dean. He begins torturing Sam to reveal Dean's location but Sam tries to talk him down about the monsters he and Dean hunt but Cole doesn't believe him. While Cole speaks through the phone, Sam escapes.

Crowley (Mark A. Sheppard) has Dean kill a man's wife after the man sold his soul. However, Dean instead kills the man, making Crowley furious as he has lost a soul. Meanwhile, Castiel (Misha Collins) is beginning to deteriorate his health, causing a car crash, wounding him and Hannah (Erica Carroll). Hannah decides to go to the dungeons in Heaven to talk to Metatron (Curtis Armstrong). Metatron offers Castiel's remaining grace if he's freed but Castiel arrives to refuse the deal, while Metatron states that he will somehow get out and kill everyone.

Realizing Dean is out of control, Crowley gives Sam his whereabouts. Dean refuses to go with Sam but the bar is attacked by Cole, who knocks down Sam. Cole reveals that he allowed Sam to escape and then follow him as he would go with Dean. Cole tries to attack Dean but he is no match for him and is brutally wounded. Dean leaves him alive so that he will have to live with the shame of having been unable to avenge his father. Sam then spreads holy water on Dean so he can handcuff him and take him to the car. Cole leaves but goes to a library to start researching on demons as a way to kill Dean. Sam then gives Crowley the First Blade and while driving, Dean begins to taunt him, stating he will have no mercy on him.

== Reception ==
=== Viewers ===
The episode was watched by 2.13 million viewers with a 0.9/3 share among adults aged 18 to 49. This was a 15% decrease in viewership from the previous episode, which was watched by 2.50 million viewers. This means that 0.9 percent of all households with televisions watched the episode, while 3 percent of all households watching television at that time watched it. Supernatural ranked as the second most watched program on The CW in the day, behind The Flash.

=== Critical reviews ===
Professional ratings
Review scores
Source	Rating
IGN	8.7
TV Fanatic	4.6/5 stars
Den of Geek	5.0/5.0 stars

"Reichenbach" received critical acclaim. Amy Ratcliffe of IGN gave the episode a "great" 8.7 out of 10 and wrote in her verdict, "Tonight's Supernatural jumped forward in unexpected ways but seeing Sam and Dean confront each other so soon cemented what Dean said in the premiere: Dean doesn't care. This episode drove it home, and Dean's behavior felt like a punch in the gut – in a satisfying sort of way."

Hunter Bishop of TV Overmind, wrote, "Castiel, though, seems like he made peace with his death; that is new, at worst, and cool, at best. I'm willing to watch this play out. I think it could have potential. Some real conflict between the Winchesters outside of the basic crap we've been trundling through for the last nine years is just so appealing. I hope Demon-Dean stays Demon-Dean or at least become Self-Confident-Dean. I hope that Sam gets something to do besides look incredibly sick and chase his brother around. I hope Castiel... does something interesting. Perhaps my hopes are up. But anyways. I liked this episode. It's nice to have Supernatural back; as busy as I am, it's a nice and comfortable hour-long spot for me to enjoy. Hope it's the same for you guys."

Samantha Highfill of EW stated: "Supernatural lives and dies on the relationship between the Winchester brothers. That's not to say that they need to be on good terms for the show to be good. In fact, some of the show's greatest moments have come out of disagreements or one brother trying to save the other from himself. And despite a slow start to the hour, the Demon Dean story line seems to be building to yet another epic moment of brotherly love. No, it didn't happen in this hour, which felt more like setup for what's to come than anything else, but by the end of it, the Winchester brothers were back in the same room, and of course, back in the Impala. From here, things can only get darker and more interesting."

Sean McKenna from TV Fanatic, gave a 4.6 star rating out of 5, stating: "Overall, this was an intense hour providing a mesmerizing and freighting Dean right until the last moments. There's something terrifying (and I can only imagine for Sam) in listening to the elder Winchester brother talk so coldly about what he's going to do to Sam. And as much as I want Sam to save him, I can't help but be pleased at Supernatural's success with exploring a story that involves a demon Dean."

MaryAnn Sleasman of TV.com wrote, "'Reichenbach' kicked up the momentum that was set in motion by 'Black' and left me wanting MORE. NOW. Which is all it really needed to do. After the goofiness of 'Black,' this crazy train to angstville was just want I needed to get my giddy on."

Bridget LaMonica from Den of Geek gave the episode a perfect 5 star rating out of 5, stating "Dean doing the demon eye-flick is creepy. His mild enjoyment later when he's gut-stabbing Lester is even more unsettling. Demon Dean is an unusual sort of character. He's not a good guy, and he's not exactly the demon friend that Crowley had hoped for. The Mark converted Dean into a demon, sure, but he's not one to be controlled by the King of Hell. There's no other being like Dean in the world, which is probably what a lot of his one night stands would say. Did I go there? I think I did."
