= Zomboy discography =

This is the discography of English DJ and producer Zomboy.

== Discography ==
=== Studio albums and extended plays ===
Title	Details	Peak chart positions			
Title	Details	US 200	US Dance	US Heat	US Independent
Game Time EP	Released: 8 August 2011; Label: Never Say Die Records; Formats: Digital download	—	—	—	—
The Dead Symphonic	Released: 3 September 2012; Label: Never Say Die Records; Formats: Digital download	—	17	26	—
Here to Stay (feat. Lady Chann) Remixes EP	Released: 13 May 2013; Label: No Tomorrow Records; Formats: Digital download	—	—	—	—
Reanimated, Pt. 1 EP	Released: 9 September 2013; Label: Never Say Die Records; Formats: Digital Download, Vinyl	169	3	7	35
Reanimated, Pt. 2 EP	Released: 9 September 2013; Label: No Tomorrow Records; Formats: Digital Download, Vinyl	—	—	—	—
The Outbreak	Released: 4 August 2014; Label: Never Say Die Records; Formats: Digital Download, Vinyl	—	—	—	—
Resurrected LP	Released: May 25, 2015; Label: Never Say Die Records; Formats: Digital Download	—	9	12	38
Neon Grave EP	Released: March 11, 2016; Label: Never Say Die Records; Formats: Digital download	—	3	9	35
Neon Grave Remixed EP	Released: February 6, 2017; Label: Never Say Die Records; Formats: Digital download	—	—	—	—
Rott N' Roll, Pt. 1 - EP	Released: August 7, 2017; Label: Never Say Die Records; Formats: Digital download	—	—	—	—
Rott N' Roll, Pt. 2 - EP	Released: March 29, 2019; Label: Never Say Die Records; Formats: Digital download	—	—	—	—
Dead Man Walking, Pt. 1 - EP	Released: July 22, 2022; Label: Rott N' Roll Records; Formats: Digital download	—	—	—	—
Dead Man Walking, Pt. 2 - EP	Released: October 25, 2024; Label: Rott N' Roll Records; Formats: Digital download	—	—	—	—
"—" denotes a recording that did not chart or was not released.

=== Singles ===
Year	Title	Label	Album/EP
2011	"Organ Donor"	Never Say Die Records	Game Time
2012	"Kick It" (with SKisM)	Never Say Die Records	—
2013	"Here to Stay" (featuring Lady Chann)	No Tomorrow Recordings	—
2014	"WTF!?"	Never Say Die Records	The Outbreak
2014	"Survivors" (with Must Die!)	Owsla/Nest	The Outbreak
2014	"Outbreak" (featuring Armanni Reign)	Never Say Die Records	The Outbreak
2016	"Like a Bitch"	Never Say Die Records	Neon Grave
2016	"Lights Out"	Never Say Die Records	Neon Grave
2016	"Invaders"	Never Say Die Records	Black Label XXL Picked & Mixed By: SKisM
2017	"Rotten" (featuring Bok Nero)	Never Say Die Records	Rott N' Roll, Pt. 1
2017	"Young & Dangerous" (featuring Kato)	Never Say Die Records	Rott N' Roll, Pt. 1
2018	"Rebel Bass"	Never Say Die Records	—
2018	"Lone Wolf"	Never Say Die Records	Rott N' Roll, Pt. 2
2018	"Hide N Seek"	Never Say Die Records	Never Say Die Vol. 6
2019	"Born to Survive" (featuring rx Soul)	Never Say Die Records	Rott N' Roll, Pt. 2
2020	"Battlefields"	Never Say Die Records	—
2021	"Shell Shock" (with Nghtmre featuring Georgia Ku)	Gud Vibrations	—
2021	"Valley of Violence"	Never Say Die Records	—
2022	"Flatlined" (featuring Micah Martin)	Rott N' Roll Records	Dead Man Walking, Pt. 1
2022	"Desperado"	Rott N' Roll Records	Dead Man Walking, Pt. 1
2023	"Monsters" (featuring Micah Martin)	Rott N' Roll Records	—
2024	"Fallout"	Rott N' Roll Records	Dead Man Walking, Pt. 2
2024	"Project Z"	Rott N' Roll Records	Dead Man Walking, Pt. 2
2025	"Royal Blood"	Rott N' Roll Records	—
2025	"Doomsday"	Bassrush Records	—
2026	"Time Machine" (with Barely Alive)	Monstercat	—
2026	"Emulator"	Rott N' Roll Records	—
2026	"Build Me Up"	Rott N' Roll Records	—

=== Remixes ===
Year	Title	Artist	Release	Label
2010	"Only Girl (in the World)" (as Joshua Mellody)	Rihanna	Released on YouTube	N/A
2011	"Demons" (as Joshua Mellody)	Fenech-Soler	Released on YouTube	N/A
2011	"Little Dreams" (as Joshua Mellody)	Ellie Goulding	Released on YouTube	N/A
2011	"Pressure"	Nadia Ali, Starkillers and Alex Kenji	Released on YouTube	Simply Delicious
2011	"Bass Cannon"	Flux Pavilion	Released on SoundCloud	N/A
2011	"Movements"	Dead Cat Bounce	Movements EP	Dga Fau Records
2012	"Black Books"	Doctor P	Unreleased	N/A
2012	"Still Getting It"	Foreign Beggars featuring Skrillex	Never Say Die (Deluxe Edition)	UKF/Never Say Die Records
2012	"Hot Right Now"	DJ Fresh featuring Rita Ora	Hot Right Now EP	Ministry of Sound
2012	"Parasite" (with SKisM)	Hadouken!	Parasite (Remixes)	Ministry of Sound
2013	"Sunlight"	Modestep	Evolution Theory (Deluxe Edition)	Polydor
2014	"Where We Belong"	Fedde Le Grand and Di-rect	Where We Belong (The Remixes)	Flamingo
2014	"When We Were Young"	Dillon Francis and Sultan + Ned Shepard featuring The Chain Gang of 1974	When We Were Young Remixes	Columbia
2014	"Ragga Bomb" (with Skrillex)	Skrillex featuring Ragga Twins	Ease My Mind v Ragga Bomb Remixes EP	Owsla / Big Beat Records
2015	"Ghost"	Delta Heavy	Ghost	RAM Records
2016	"Don't Let Me Down"	The Chainsmokers	Don't Let Me Down (Remixes)	Columbia
2016	"Follow"	Bro Safari	Released as a Free Download on SoundCloud	N/A
2023	"Don't Let Me Let You Go"	Dillon Francis (with Illenium and Evan Giia)	Don't Let Me Let You Go Remix	Astralwerks
2024	"Big Boss"	Doctor P	Circus Four	Circus Records
2025	"Wish I Could Forget"	Slander, Blackbear and Bring Me the Horizon	Wish I Could Forget (The Remixes)	N/A

=== Other appearances ===
Year	Title	Release	Label
2011	"Dirty Disko" (Game Time EP bonus track)	Released on YouTube and SoundCloud	Never Say Die Records
2011	"Falcon 6"	Released on YouTube	N/A
2011	"P.A.R.T.Y" (Game Time EP bonus track)	Released on YouTube and SoundCloud	Never Say Die Records
2012	"Cage the Rage"	Never Say Die	Never Say Die Records
2012	"Jam on It"	Released as a free download on SoundCloud	Never Say Die Records
2012	"Kick It" (with SKisM)	Division EP	Never Say Die Records
2013	"Mind Control"	Never Say Die Vol. 2	Never Say Die Records
2013	"Run It"	Never Say Die Vol. 2	Never Say Die Records
2013	"Terror Squad (VIP)"	Never Say Die Fifty	Never Say Die Records
2013	"Here to Stay (MUST DIE! Remix)" [feat. Lady Chann]	Never Say Die Fifty	Never Say Die Records
2014	"Paradiso (Festival Mix)"	Released as a free download on SoundCloud	N/A
2014	"Raptor (SKisM & LAXX Remix)"	Never Say Die, Vol. 3	Never Say Die Records
2015	"Send the Cash" (feat. Gravity) [with 12th Planet]	Leaked on SoundCloud and YouTube	N/A
2016	"Like a Bitch"	Never Say Die Vol. 4	Never Say Die Records
2016	"Invaders"	NSD: Black Label XXL	Never Say Die Records
2017	"Dead Presidents" (feat. Jay Fresh) [with 12th Planet]	Never Say Die One Hundred	Never Say Die Records
2017	"Bop It" (with Eptic)	Never Say Die Vol. 5	Never Say Die Records
2019	"Quiet Storm" (with DJ Snake)	Carte Blanche	Geffen
2026	"Bromance Is Dead"	Never Say Die Vol. 7	Never Say Die Records
