= T. Glenn Pait =

T. Glenn Pait is the Director of the T. Glenn Pait Spine Clinic located in the UAMS Jackson T. Stephens Spine Institute.

== Education and training ==
Pait went to medical school and completed his residency in Neurological Surgery at George Washington University School of Medicine & Health Sciences. He completed medical school in 1981. He is a fellow in the American College of Surgeons and the American Association of Neurological Surgery.

== Spine clinic ==
The T. Glenn Pait Spine Clinic includes a multidisciplinary team that deals with patients with spine problems. They have a surgical spine specialist, a nonsurgical spine specialist, a spine psychiatrist, a pain management specialist, a psychiatrist and psychologist.

== Radio show ==
Pait is the co-creator and co-host of the popular weekly radio show "Here's to Your Health." It is produced in the US and broadcasts online and on various NPR affiliate stations.

== Awards and honors ==
- Fellow (FAANS), American Association of Neurological Surgeons 2014
- CMS Meaningful Use Stage 1 Certification, EpicCare Ambulatory EMR, Epic Systems Corporation
- Regional Top Doctor, Castle Connolly 2014

== Publications ==
- The influence of war on the development of neurosurgery. Dowdy, J., Pait, T. G.; J. Neurosurg.. 2013 Oct 15.
- Placement of unilateral lag screw through the lateral mass of C-1: description of a novel technique. Tabbosha, M., Dowdy, J., Pait, T. G.; J Neurosurg Spine. 2013 Jul.

7 citations

- "General surgical pearls" for the anterior exposure of vertebral fractures. Barone, G. W., Pait, T. G., Eidt, J. F., Howington, J. A.; Am Surg. 2001 Oct.
- The Rumel technique for lateral thoracotomy closure. Barone, G. W., Pait, T. G., Lightfoot, M. L., Ketel, B. L.; J Cardiovasc Surg (Torino). 2001 Aug.
- Compound osteosynthesis in the thoracic spine for treatment of vertebral metastases. Technical report. Pait, T. G., de Castro, I., Arnautovic, K. I., Borba, L. A.; Arq Neuropsiquiatr. 2000 Mar.
- Inside-outside technique for posterior occipitocervical spine instrumentation and stabilization: preliminary results. Pait, T. G., Al-Mefty, O., Boop, F. A., Arnautovic, K. I., Rahman, S., Ceola, W.; J Neurosurg. 1999 Jan.
- Herophilus of Alexandria (325-255 B. C.). The father of anatomy. Wiltse, L. L., Pait, T. G.; Spine. 1998 Sep 1.
- Muscle and musculocutaneous flap coverage of exposed spinal fusion devices. Hochberg, J., Ardenghy, M., Yuen, J., Gonzalez-Cruz, R., Miura, Y., Conrado, R. M., Pait, T. G.; Plast Reconstr Surg. 1998 Aug.
- The anterior extrapleural approach to the thoracolumbar junction revisited. Barone, G. W., Eidt, J. F., Webb, J. W., Hudec, W. A., Pait, T. G.; Am Surg. 1998 Apr.
- Pitfalls and successes of peer review in neurosurgery. Laws, E. R., Pait, T. G., Jane, J. A.; J Neurosurg. 1997 Dec.
