= The Survivor (2016 film) =

- Directed by: Danial Afzal
- Produced by: Shazia Sikandar, Kruti Mehta
- Starring: Muhammad Muneeb Khan; Momina Khan; Tuba Khan; Tahir Khan; Shagufta Khan; Mowadat H. Rana
- Cinematography: Danial Afzal
- Edited by: Sameer Hamdani
- Production companies: Arash Visuals, Inc
- Distributed by: iflix
- Release date: 2016
- Running time: 27 minutes
- Country: Pakistan
- Languages: English, Urdu

The Survivor is a 2016 Pakistani-American documentary short written and directed by Danial Afzal, of Arash Visuals, Inc, and produced by Shazia Sikandar and Kruti Mehta. The film follows the story of a boy named Muneeb who survived the Army Public School Massacre of 2014 in Peshawar, Pakistan.

== Synopsis ==
The story follows Muhammad Muneeb Khan, who lost his brother, Shaheer, in a tragic incident that occurred in Peshawar, Pakistan on 16 December 2014. The Taliban attacked the Army Public School and killed over 130 children. This film is a look into the mind of Muneeb, who still has Post-Traumatic Stress Disorder (PTSD) while attempting to find his purpose. The film's story is presented in the format of a personal statement for a college application. It also interviews his family members and Mowadat Rana, a psychiatrist and professor, who discusses the struggles of PTSD.

== Screenings ==
The Survivor premiered in 2016 in Lahore, Pakistan. During 2017, it was entered into the 16th IWM Short Film Festival in London, and the Ismailia International Film Festival in Cairo, Egypt. In 2018, The Survivor was screened at the 11th International Children's Rights Film Festival in Dhaka, Bangladesh, and the 1st Pakistan International Film Festival in Karachi.

== Reception ==
Mehr Sher of The Nation was moved to tears at the screening, and found the film to be a "must-watch film for all those that have a conscience". Kruti Mehta of The News International wrote that the music made the documentary relatable to viewers, and thought that the director and producer effectively used the film as an actual personal statement to promote Muneeb Khan to get scholarships and funding for college.

== Awards ==
Festival name	Edition	Festival location	Year	Award
Impact Docs Documentary Film Festival	14th	La Jolla, California, US	2017	Award of Recognition
Chicago South Asian Film Festival	9th	Chicago, Illinois, US	2017	Best Documentary Short

== Home media ==
This film was released to the iflix streaming service in September 2018.
