= Survival epidemiology =

Field of medicine devoted to the study of post-diagnostic outcomes

Survival epidemiology is a field of medical science dedicated to the study of health outcomes following diagnosis in populations living with an established disease. It focuses on postdiagnosis outcomes such as mortality, recurrence, progression, treatment tolerance and functional outcomes, and uses epidemiologic and causal-inference approaches tailored to the postdiagnosis period.

The field was first defined in the Journal of Clinical Epidemiology by epidemiologist Raphael E. Cuomo, commonly cited as the father of survival epidemiology. Survival epidemiology treats diagnosis as a boundary that can change time scales, effect modifiers (e.g., stage and treatment pathway), and bias structures, including conditioning on disease (collider stratification), time-dependent confounding, immortal time bias and reverse causation.

Methodologies emphasized by survival epidemiology include aligning time zero with clinical decision points, defining exposures as clinical strategies, and applying approaches such as target-trial emulation, marginal structural models, g-computation, joint models, and competing-risk and multistate frameworks. A STROBE-inspired checklist for reporting survival epidemiology studies has been proposed.

Applications span disease areas with structured clinical trajectories and longitudinal medical records, including oncology and cardiometabolic, renal, pulmonary and hepatic conditions, and include efforts to distinguish prevention recommendations from postdiagnosis guidance when evidence differs.

== See also ==
- Observational study
- Electronic health record
- Survival analysis
- Causal inference
