= Soul Survivor (Supernatural) =

- Supernatural episode
- Episode no.: Season 10; Episode 3
- Directed by: Jensen Ackles
- Written by: Brad Buckner; Eugenie Ross-Leming
- Cinematography by: Serge Ladouceur
- Editing by: Donald L. Koch
- Production code: 4X5801
- Original air date: October 21, 2014
- Running time: 41 minutes

Guest appearances
- Erica Carroll as Hannah; Jud Tylor as Adina

Episode chronology
| ← Previous "Reichenbach" | Next → "Paper Moon" |
- Supernatural season 10

"Soul Survivor" is the third episode of the paranormal drama television series Supernatural's season 10, and the 198th overall. The episode was written by co-executive producers Brad Buckner & Eugenie Ross-Leming and directed by main cast member Jensen Ackles. It was first broadcast on October 21, 2014 on The CW. In the episode, Sam has now captured Dean and is trying to cure him to become human again. Meanwhile, Castiel and Hannah are attacked by Alina, an angel who wants revenge after they killed her friend, Daniel.

The episode received generally positive reviews, but most mixed, with critics criticizing Dean's return to human too soon.

== Plot ==
Castiel and Hannah continue their journey towards the bunker with Castiel growing weaker all the time. At a gas station, they are attacked by a vengeful Adina and a weakened Castiel is left near-death. Before Adina can kill the two angels, Crowley, having problems with ruling Hell due to his time with Dean, kills Adina and steals her grace. Crowley gives a reluctant Castiel Adina's grace, restoring him to full strength. In return, Crowley asks Castiel to deal with Dean. Having captured Dean, Sam begins the process of curing him using the ritual they discovered a year and a half before. As the ritual goes on, Dean taunts Sam over his desperate attempts to find him, including tricking a man into selling his soul so he could interrogate a crossroads demon. Unknown to Sam, the ritual makes Dean human enough that he is able to escape and he stalks Sam throughout the bunker. However, Castiel finally arrives and subdues Dean. They are able to successfully complete the ritual and Dean is returned to being human, but retains the Mark of Cain. Castiel suggests that a guilty-feeling Dean take some time off as things are quiet, however, in Tulsa, Oklahoma, a mysterious red-haired woman sits in a hotel room under two men staked to the ceiling.

== Reception ==
=== Viewers ===
The episode was watched by 2.08 million viewers with a 0.9/3 share among adults aged 18 to 49. This was a 3% decrease in viewership from the previous episode, which was watched by 2.13 million viewers. This means that 0.9 percent of all households with televisions watched the episode, while 3 percent of all households watching television at that time watched it. Supernatural ranked as the second most watched program on The CW in the day, behind The Flash.

=== Critical reviews ===
Professional ratings
Review scores
| Source | Rating |
|---|---|
| IGN | 6.5 |
| TV Fanatic | 4.4/5 stars |
| Den of Geek | 5.0/5.0 stars |

"Soul Survivor" received generally positive reviews. Amy Ratcliffe of IGN gave the episode an "okay" 6.5 out of 10 and wrote in her verdict, "Tonight's episode of Supernatural sent conflicting messages. It showed the fantastic possibilities of the Dean vs. Sam dynamic only to take it all away without any hint of it being a trick. The anticlimactic curing of Demon Dean is incredibly disappointing."

Chris King of TV Overmind, wrote, "Ultimately, I think we will get some of these emotional moments in future episodes of Season 10 (because there must always be Winchester angst), but without any of them in 'Soul Survivor,' the ending of the episode felt a little flat. Do I think the Supernatural writing staff should duplicate what happens in 'Welcome Home'? No, but I think this piece of Supernatural fanfiction, more than most, does a nice job of depicting both Sam and Dean as the characters that they are and provides a pretty emotionally satisfying conclusion to the Demon Dean arc."

Samantha Highfill of EW stated: "The moment Dean became a demon in last season's finale, my first thought was: What is it going to be like when he comes face-to-face with Sam? That thought was then quickly followed by: How are they going to cure him? Will it be their brotherly love that finally pulls Dean back from the other side? Will Sam's tear-filled plea be the thing to save his big brother? The answer, as we now know, is no, but the bottom line is that this episode finally gave us the Demon Dean moments we've been imagining. There was the confrontation with Sam where harsh words were said and a hurt Sam refused to give up, followed by Dean's return to the human world. It might not have been as dramatic as it was in my head, but that's probably for the best."

Sean McKenna from TV Fanatic, gave a 4.4 star rating out of 5, stating: "If anything, the hour seemed to re-align things for all the characters and set them on a new course. But like Castiel said to Dean, things seem pretty much back to normal in Heaven and Hell for now. That can only mean it won't take long before some new supernatural being, like that mysterious red-haired woman at the end, steps up to cause problems. And of course, after a little rest, drinking and fast food, Sam and Dean should be ready to take up the task. Though I would think they need to talk a bit about the whole demon ordeal... if it's truly all fixed and over."

MaryAnn Sleasman of TV.com wrote, "The allure of endless possibility was strong in this one, like it has been since the very beginning of this season. Dean is cured, but not really. Cas is saved, but not really. We have no idea when those two are going to fall apart again, but we're confident it'll happen. Metatron is locked up, but probably not for long, and Castiel has an awesome, badass, and yet still totally awkward girlfriend whose every surviving week on this show is amazing, given its terrible track record with regard to killing female characters. And finally, our Big Bad has yet to reveal himself (or herself)... though I think that finale scene gave us a pretty good idea of who's going to be terrorizing all these sad little pseudo-monsters for the rest (or at least most) of the season."

Bridget LaMonica from Den of Geek gave the episode a perfect 5 star rating out of 5, stating "A couple of big developments made this a big episode for the season. Now we’ll have to see how Dean fairs with his continuing Mark of Cain problem, and we didn’t see Cole so we can expect him to show up again. There was also a delightful little teaser at the end of the episode to give us a glimpse at a new fiery-headed baddy credited as “Rowena.” More on her soon, I hope."
