= Survival Skill =

Survival skills are techniques to be able to survive in an environment.

Survival Skill(s) may also refer to:

- Survival Skills (album), a 2009 album by KRS-One and Buckshot, or the title song
- Survival Skills (film), a 2020 U.S. comedy-horror film
- "Survival Skills" (episode), a 1999 TV episode of Beverly Hills 90210 (season 9)
- "Survival Skills" (segment), a segment from the radio quiz show That! Medical Quiz Show
- Survival Skills (books; a.k.a. "SS"), a series of books by Joy Berry
- The Novel: A Survival Skill (book), a 2015 book by Tim Parks

== See also ==
- Category:survival skills
- Survivalism, prepper
- Bushcraft
