= Survive (disambiguation) =

Survive is the verb form of survival.

Survive may also refer to:

== Music ==
- Survive (band), electronica group

=== Albums ===
- Survive (B'z album), or the title song
- Survive (Much the Same album)
- Survive (Nuclear Assault album), or the title song
- Survive (Stratovarius album), was released in 2022

=== Songs ===
- "Survive" (David Bowie song), 2000
- "Survive" (Lewis Capaldi song), 2025
- "Survive", by Baker Boy featuring Uncle Jack Charles from the 2021 album Gela
- "Survive", by Childish Gambino from Bando Stone & the New World, 2024
- "Survive", by Miyavi, 2010
- "Survive", by Rise Against from the 2006 album The Sufferer & the Witness
- "Survive", by Lacuna Coil from the 2009 album Shallow Life

== Other uses ==
- Survive (TV series), an American web television series
- Escape from Atlantis, a board game originally titled Survive!
- Survive! (film)

== See also ==
- Survival (disambiguation)
- Survivor (disambiguation)
- Surviving (disambiguation)
