= Survival (disambiguation) =

Survival is the act of surviving; to stay living

Survival may also refer to:

== Biology ==
- Self-preservation, behavior that ensures the survival of an organism
- Survival of the fittest

== Medicine and statistics ==
- Survival analysis, a statistical technique to analyze longevity
- Survival rate, the percentage of people who are alive for a given period of time

== Arts, entertainment, and media ==
=== Gaming ===
==== Games ====
- Science Horizons Survival, or Survival, a video game for the ZX Spectrum
- Survival: The Ultimate Challenge, a 2001 PC strategy game by Techland

==== Other uses in gaming ====
- Survival game, a genre
- Survival mode, a game mode

=== Genres ===
- Survival film, a film genre
- Survival horror, a genre

=== Literature ===
- Survival!, a 1984 collection of short stories by Gordon R. Dickson
- Survival: A Thematic Guide to Canadian Literature, a 1972 book by Margaret Atwood
- "Survival", a short story by John Wyndham which appears in the collection The Seeds of Time
- Survival (manhwa) (살아남기; Saranamgi), a Korean manhwa comic book

=== Music ===
==== Albums ====
- Survival (Bob Marley and the Wailers album), or the title song
- Survival (Born from Pain album), 2008
- Survival (Dave East album), 2019
- Survival (Grand Funk Railroad album), 1971
- Survival (The O'Jays album), or the title song

==== Songs ====
- "Survival" (Drake song), 2018
- "Survival" (Eminem song), 2013
- "Survival" (Madonna song), 1994
- "Survival" (Muse song), 2012
- "Survival," by Glay from Heavy Gauge
- "Survival" by America from Alibi
- "Survival", the original name of the song "Eye of the Tiger" by Survivor
- "Survival," by The Moody Blues from Octave
- "Survival," by Yes from the self-titled album

==== Other uses in music ====
- Survival (band), a project of Dutch multi-instrumentalist and composer Jack Langevelt
- Survival Festival, an Australian music festival

=== Television ===
==== Episodes ====
- "Survival", A Man Called Shenandoah episode 2 (1965)
- "Survival", Adventures in Paradise season 3, episode 13 (1961)
- "Survival", Branded season 1, episode 1 (1965)
- "Survival", Cadillacs and Dinosaurs episode 7 (1993)
- "Survival", Casualty series 1, episode 14 (1986)
- "Survival", Chicago P.D. season 11, episode 6 (2024)
- "Survival", Combat! season 1, episode 23 (1963)
- "Survival", Dallas (1978) season 2, episode 9 (1978)
- "Survival", Danger Bay season 2, episode 6 (1986)
- "Survival", Frontier House episode 4 (2002)
- "Survival", Great Barrier Reef (2015) episode 3 (2016)
- "Survival", Lassie (1954) season 3, episode 26 (1957)
- "Survival", Lassie (1954) season 16, episode 6 (1969)
- "Survival", Little House on the Prairie season 1, episode 22 (1975)
- "Survival", Lou Grant season 4, episode 14 (1981)
- "Survival", Mixed Blessings (British) series 3, episode 9 (1980)
- "Survival", Petrocelli season 2, episode 16 (1976)
- "Survival", Robotech season 4, episode 4 (1985)
- "Survival", Squadron episode 9 (1982)
- "Survival", Starsky & Hutch season 2, episode 18 (1977)
- "Survival", The Animals of Farthing Wood season 2, episode 3 (1994)
- "Survival", The Bible episode 5 (2013)
- "Survival", The Defenders (1961) season 3, episode 22 (1964)
- "Survival", The F.B.I. season 9, episode 23 (1974)
- "Survival", The High Chaparral season 1, episode 18 (1968)
- "Survival", The Life and Times of Grizzly Adams season 2, episode 2 (1977)
- "Survival", The Main Chance series 4, episode 5 (1975)
- "Survival", The Mod Squad season 4, episode 4 (1971)
- "Survival", The Pretender season 4, episode 2 (1999)
- "Survival", The Sentinel season 2, episode 22 (1997)
- "Survival", UFO episode 13 (1970)

==== Shows ====
- Survival (Doctor Who), a 1989 Doctor Who serial
- Survival, a 1992 Dutch TV program starring Marjolein Beumer
- Survival (TV series), a UK wildlife documentary programme

=== Other uses in arts, entertainment, and media ===
- Survival (journal), a journal published by the International Institute for Strategic Studies

== Other uses ==
- Survival Tobita (born 1970), a Japanese professional wrestler
- Survival International, a non-governmental human rights organization working for tribal peoples
- Survival skills, safety techniques used in dangerous situations
- Survivals, traits of culture persisting from earlier times

== See also ==
- Survivalism, a primarily American movement of individuals preparing for possible disruptions in social or political order
- Survive (disambiguation)
- Survivor (disambiguation)
- Surviving (disambiguation)
- Survival Skill (disambiguation)
