= Survival =

Concept; act of surviving

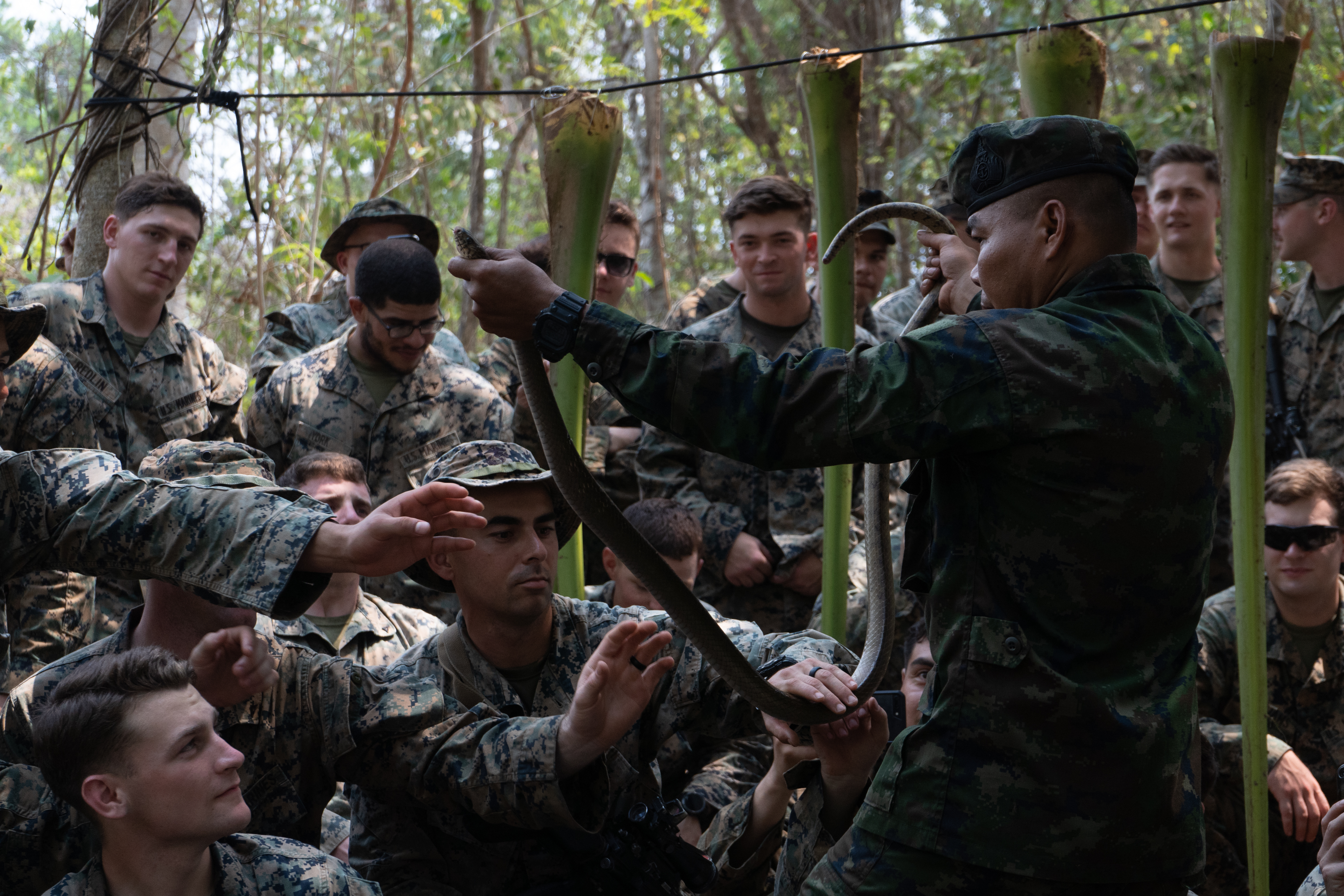
U.S. Marines learning survival skills from a Thai military officer

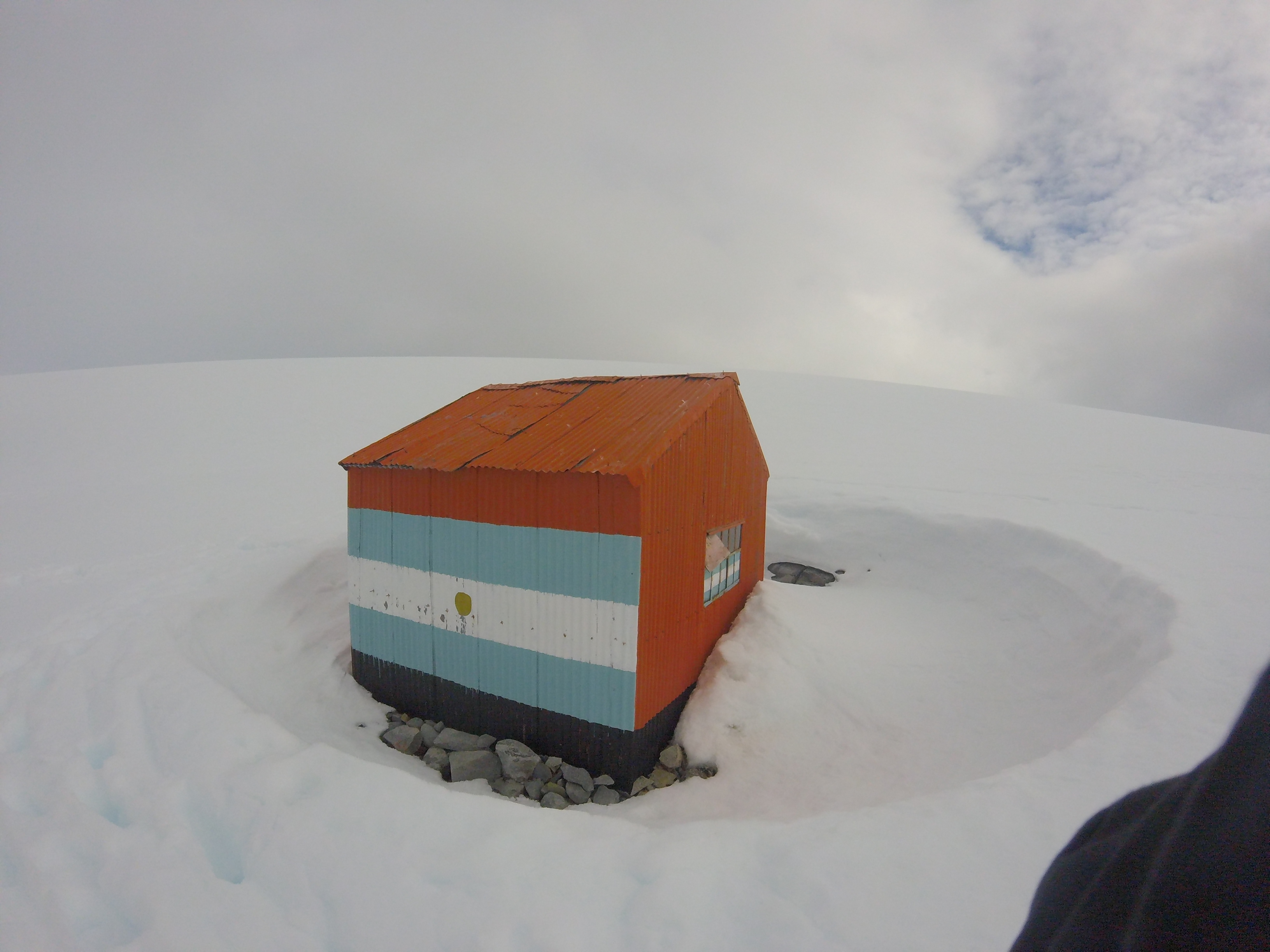
Survival outpost in Antarctica, designed to shelter humans from harsh environmental conditions

Survival or survivorship, the act of surviving, is the propensity of something to continue existing despite conditions that might kill or destroy it. The concept can be applied to humans and other living things (or, hypothetically, any sentient being), to a physical object, and to abstract things such as beliefs or ideas. Living things generally have a self-preservation instinct to survive, while objects intended for use in harsh conditions are designed for survivability.

== Meaning ==
The word, "survival", derives from the Late Latin supervivere, literally meaning "to outlive". Most commonly, "the term 'survival' means physical survival — that is, a struggle to avoid physical extermination". For example, Charles Darwin's theory of natural selection incorporates the concept of the survival of the fittest in the struggle for existence. Darwin defines the biological concept of fitness as reproductive success, so in Darwinian terms the phrase is best understood as survival of the form that will leave the most copies of itself in successive generations.

== Historical concepts of survival ==
Historical references to survival cover aspects ranging from individual survival to that of empires, civilization, and of the human race as a whole. The concept is also applied to non-living and non-physical things. In engineering, the term can be used to mean "the continued ability of the system to perform the desired function". In law, it often refers to a holder of a legal interest who outlives another with whom that interest is shared, such as a surviving spouse, or to the interest itself, such as a right of survivorship. In the United States, a designated survivor is a named individual in the presidential line of succession, chosen to stay at an undisclosed secure location, away from events such as State of the Union addresses and presidential inaugurations, to prevent a hypothetical decapitation of the government and to safeguard continuity in the office of the president in the event the president along with the vice president and multiple other officials in the presidential line of succession die in a mass-casualty incident. Congress also designates members of the Senate and House, one from each party to become their own "designated survivor" to maintain the existence of Congress in the event of a mass-casualty event.

With respect to the human consciousness, particularly when discussed in connection with the concept of a soul or spirit, survival can refer to life after death:

In much of the literature on life after death, the term survival is employed more or less interchangeably with the term immortality. And yet it is not difficult to see why the term immortality is often preferred, particularly in some religious circles. It is not simply that it is free of the associations the term survival has with merely 'living on', or with lucky escape. More positively, the term immortality suggests some superior quality of existence, whereas the term survival suggests mere temporal extension, a continuation of the status quo ante.

Survival analysis is a branch of statistics for analyzing the expected duration of time until one or more survival-ending events happen, such as death in biological organisms and failure in mechanical systems. One element of survival analysis is the survival rate, the percentage of people in a study or treatment group still alive for a given period of time after diagnosis. It is a method of describing prognosis in certain disease conditions. Survival rate can be used as yardstick for the assessment of standards of therapy. The survival period is usually reckoned from date of diagnosis or start of treatment. Survival rates are important for prognosis, but because the rate is based on the population as a whole, an individual prognosis may be different depending on newer treatments since the last statistical analysis as well as the overall general health of the patient.

Survival epidemiology is the field of medicine devoted to the study of post-diagnostic outcomes, encompassing methods from survival analysis as well as target trial emulation, structural equation modeling, and g computation.

Individuals who are concerned with surviving an anticipated catastrophic or apocalyptic event are often grouped within the practice of survivalism. Use of the term survivalist in this sense dates from the early 1960s.

== In popular culture ==
There are various kinds of media about survival. In both fiction and nonfiction, stories about individuals surviving despite particularly dangerous circumstances are popular. There is also a wide body of educational literature, sometimes referred to as a survival guide, offering advice on survival skills in various dangerous situations such as getting lost without food or water, being attacked, or being in a natural disaster.

=== In film ===
In film, the survival film is a genre in which one or more characters make an effort at physical survival, generally while being subject to hazardous conditions or a catastrophic event. It often overlaps with other film genres. It is a subgenre of the adventure film, along with swashbuckler films, war films, and safari films. Survival films are darker than most other adventure films, which usually focus their storyline on a single character, usually the protagonist. The films tend to be "located primarily in a contemporary context" and so film audiences are familiar with the setting, and the characters' activities are less romanticized. In a 1988 book, Thomas Sobchack compared the survival film to romance: "They both emphasize the heroic triumph over obstacles which threaten social order and the reaffirmation of predominant social values such as fair play and respect for merit and cooperation". The author said survival films "identify and isolate a microcosm of society", such as the surviving group from the plane crash in The Flight of the Phoenix (1965) or those on the overturned ocean liner in The Poseidon Adventure (1972). Sobchack explained, "Most of the time in a survival film is spent depicting the process whereby the group, cut off from the securities and certainties of the ordinary support networks of civilized life, forms itself into a functioning, effective unit". The group often varies in types of characters, sometimes to the point of caricature. While women have historically been stereotyped in such films, they "often play a decisive role in the success or failure of the group".

=== In video games ===
In video games, the survival game, is a subgenre of action video games set in hostile, intense, open-world environments. Players generally begin with minimal equipment and are required to survive as long as possible by crafting tools, weapons, shelters, and collecting resources. These can take the form of survival horror games, which focus on survival of the character as the game tries to frighten players with either horror graphics or scary ambience. Although combat can be part of the gameplay, the player is made to feel less in control than in typical action games through limited ammunition or weapons, health, speed and vision, or through various obstructions of the player's interaction with the game mechanics.

In games operating in a survival mode, or having such a mode as an option, the player must continue playing for as long as possible without dying in an uninterrupted session while the game presents them with increasingly difficult waves of challenges. A variant of the mode requires that the player last for a certain finite amount of time, after which victory is achieved and the mode ends. The mode is particularly common among tower defense games, where the player must improve the defenses of a specific location in order to repel enemy forces for as long as possible. Survival mode has been compared to the gameplay of classic arcade games, where players face off against increasingly stronger waves of enemies. This mode was intended to give the game a definite and sometimes sudden ending, so that other players could then play the arcade game as well.

== See also ==
- Life extension
- Longevity
- Survivalism
- Survival analysis
- Tool
- Toolbox
- Machine element
- Electrical element
- Electronic component
- Mini survival kit
- Survival kit
- Repair kit
- List of martial arts weapons
- Lists of weapons
