= All Hell Breaks Loose (Supernatural) =

- Supernatural episodes
- The demon Azazel is shot dead by Dean Winchester at the finale's end, bringing to a close a storyline running throughout the first two seasons.
- Episode nos.: Season 2 Episodes 21–22
- Directed by: Robert Singer (Part 1); Kim Manners (Part 2)
- Written by: Sera Gamble (Part 1)
- Story by: Eric Kripke & (Part 2); Michael T. Moore (Part 2)
- Teleplay by: Eric Kripke (Part 2)
- Cinematography by: Serge Ladouceur
- Editing by: Tom McQuade (Part 1); David Ekstrom (Part 2)
- Production codes: 3T5521 & 3T5522
- Original air dates: May 10, 2007 (Part 1); May 17, 2007 (Part 2)

Guest appearances
- Part 1: Jim Beaver as Bobby Singer; Fredric Lehne as Azazel; Samantha Smith as Mary Winchester; Chad Lindberg as Ash; Gabriel Tigerman as Andrew "Andy" Gallagher; Katharine Isabelle as Ava Wilson; Aldis Hodge as Jake Talley; Jessica Harmon as Lily; Part 2: Jim Beaver as Bobby Singer; Samantha Ferris as Ellen Harvelle; Jeffrey Dean Morgan as John Winchester; Fredric Lehne as Azazel; Aldis Hodge as Jake Talley; Ona Grauer as Crossroads Demon

Episode chronology
← Previous "What Is and What Should Never Be"	Next → "The Magnificent Seven"
- Supernatural season 2

"All Hell Breaks Loose" is the joint title for the two-part second-season finale of The CW television series Supernatural. It consists of the twenty-first and twenty-second episodes of the second season. "Part One" was first broadcast on May 10, 2007, and the second part aired the following week on May 17, 2007. The narrative follows series protagonist Sam Winchester (Jared Padalecki)—a young man who travels the continental United States with his brother Dean (Jensen Ackles) hunting supernatural creatures—as he is abducted by series villain Azazel (Fredric Lehne) and sent to an abandoned town. Azazel intends to find a leader for his demon army by having Sam and other psychic children like him fight to the death. Sam is eventually killed, but is resurrected after Dean sells his soul. The sole survivor, Jake Talley (Aldis Hodge), is sent by Azazel to a cemetery protected against demons, where he opens a gateway to Hell. At the end of the episode, Azazel is finally killed by Dean with the mystical Colt revolver, but not before hundreds of demons are released into the world.

The production process was plagued with problems, and changes had to be made throughout filming. "Part One's" setting was altered after production learned of a pre-existing set, which had been used for the western television series Bordertown. The choice of location in turn influenced the type of supernatural monster that was featured. The once-epic script of "Part Two" had to be toned down due to budgetary reasons, with weather conditions forcing the episode's climax to be filmed on a sound stage rather than on location. The scenes featuring the return of John Winchester (Jeffrey Dean Morgan) had to be filmed weeks in advance using blue screen due to the actor's limited availability.

Despite season-low ratings, the episodes garnered positive reviews from critics, who praised both the writing and the decision to end the main storylines. Fredric Lehne's and Ona Grauer's performances were also applauded, with Jessica Harmon gaining a Leo Award nomination for her role.

== Plot ==
=== Part one ===
Sam Winchester (Padalecki) is abducted by the yellow-eyed demon Azazel (Lehne) and taken to the abandoned town of Cold Oak, supposedly the most haunted place in America. Also placed there are Azazel's other "psychic children"—young men and women whom the demon visited as babies, doing something that gives them supernatural abilities later in life—including Andy Gallagher (Gabriel Tigerman) and Ava Wilson (Katharine Isabelle), as well as new characters Lily (Jessica Harmon) and Jake Talley (Hodge). Ava had been abducted months earlier, but claims to have no knowledge of her whereabouts during the time gap. Lily tries to leave the town, but is killed by an Acheri demon, prompting the others to seek refuge in a building, protecting themselves from the demon with barriers of salt. As Dean Winchester (Ackles) and fellow hunter Bobby Singer (Jim Beaver) head to Harvelle's Roadhouse—a saloon frequented by hunters—for help and find it burned to the ground with the body of hunter Ash (Chad Lindberg) buried in the wreckage, Andy uses his mind-control abilities to send Dean his location telepathically.

After falling asleep that night, Sam is visited in a dream by Azazel, who reveals that he has brought them all together so they can fight to the death, with the sole survivor becoming the leader of his army of demons. Admitting that he killed Sam's girlfriend Jessica because he believed she was holding him back from returning to his old life of hunting supernatural creatures, the demon then shows him the night of his mother's death. Azazel had come into Sam's nursery and fed him his blood, with Mary Winchester (Samantha Smith) walking in and recognizing the demon.

Later, when Ava and Andy are alone together, she lets the Acheri demon into the building, and uses a new ability to command it to kill him. After revealing to Sam that she has actually been in the town all the months she has been missing, killing off other psychic children whom Azazel has sent there, she sets the Acheri demon on him. However, Jake sneaks up behind her and uses his superhuman strength to break her neck, prompting the now free Acheri demon to flee. As Sam and Jake then start to leave the town, Jake attacks him out of distrust, but Sam gains the upper hand and apparently knocks him unconscious. However, as Sam is distracted by an arriving Dean and Bobby, Jake regains consciousness and fatally stabs him. Dean assures his brother he will take care of him, but Sam dies in his arms.

=== Part two ===
Desperate to save his brother, Dean sells his soul to a Crossroads Demon (Ona Grauer) in exchange for Sam's resurrection, and is given only one year before collection is due. They later conduct research at Bobby's home, hoping to determine Azazel's plan. Ellen Harvelle (Samantha Ferris), owner of the now-destroyed Roadhouse, then arrives, and is forced to drink holy water to prove she is not possessed by a demon. After giving them a map of Wyoming, which Ash had left in the Roadhouse's safe, she points out five Xs representing the frontier churches built by Samuel Colt—hunter and creator of the mystical Colt, a gun capable of killing anything. Research also shows that railway lines connect all the churches in the form of a pentagram, creating a giant devil's trap that demons cannot enter.

At the pentagram's center is an old cowboy cemetery, which Azazel forces Jake to go to by threatening his family. The Winchesters, Bobby, and Ellen are there to meet him, but Jake, having given in to his demonic side, develops mind-control abilities and orders Ellen to put her gun to her head. Everyone is forced to lower their weapons, giving Jake time to use the Colt as a key to open a mausoleum. However, Sam then shoots Jake in the back, and finishes him off with multiple shots as he begs for mercy. As the mausoleum doors begin to open, they realize it is a Devil's Gate—a doorway to Hell. A rush of demons then escape and break the iron railway lines of the devil's trap, allowing Azazel to enter. As Ellen and Bobby try to close the gateway, Sam and Dean take the Colt to confront Azazel. Unfortunately, the demon catches them by surprise and takes the gun. After taunting Dean about his demonic pact and questioning if what came back was "one hundred percent pure Sam", Azazel prepares to kill them. To his surprise, the escaped spirit of John Winchester (Morgan) grabs him, distracting him long enough for Dean to take back the Colt and shoot him in the heart, finally killing him. As Bobby and Ellen manage to close the gates, John's spirit moves on. Knowing they now have to face an army of demons, Sam promises to try to free Dean from his deal.

== Production ==
=== Guest stars ===
The first episode featured the return of many characters. Actress Samantha Smith reprised her role as Mary Winchester in a flashback, with Chad Lindberg making an appearance as the hunter Ash. Actor Gabriel Tigerman of the second-season episode "Simon Said" guest starred as the mind-controlling Andy Gallagher, and Katharine Isabelle of "Hunted" returned as the missing Ava Wilson. Other of Azazel's psychic children introduced in the episode were the heart-stopping Lily, portrayed by Jessica Harmon, and the super-strong Jake Talley, who is played in both episodes by Aldis Hodge. Actor Jim Beaver also guest starred in both parts as recurring character Bobby Singer, as did Fredric Lehne as the yellow-eyed demon Azazel. Lehne first portrayed the character in the second-season premiere "In My Time of Dying," and was originally meant to play the part only temporarily because the demon changes human hosts periodically. However, the show runners liked him so much they kept him in the role. Executive producer and director Kim Manners was happy with this decision, believing Lehne brought to the character "a real Jack Nicholson flavor." The second episode brought back actress Samantha Ferris as hunter Ellen Harvelle, as well as Jeffrey Dean Morgan as John Winchester, whose previous appearance was in the season premiere. Morgan's busy schedule required his scenes for the episode to be filmed weeks in advance.

=== Writing ===
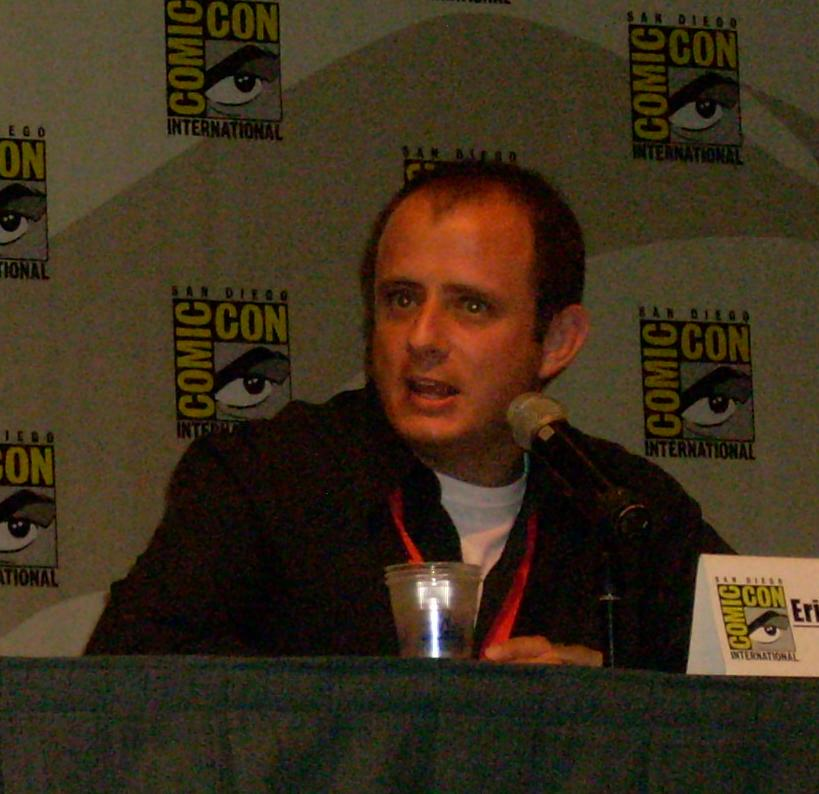
Supernatural creator Eric Kripke wrote the second episode.

Multiple storylines spanning the first two seasons were brought to a close in the two-part season finale, including the search for the demon Azazel and the existence of Azazel's psychic children. As many of the show's questions are answered in one long conversation by Azazel, series creator Eric Kripke and writer Sera Gamble had to rewrite the demon's speech multiple times because they felt that "the payoff [was] never as good as the anticipation." Though it would have been easier for them to keep postponing the revelations, the writers believed they would get "crushed under the anticipation" because they would not be able to satisfy fans if they kept building up more expectations. As for the psychic children, the writers originally intended to continue their storyline into the third season, but ultimately killed them off after deciding the characters were not as interesting as demons and monsters. In the first version of the script, the character of Lily was two roles: a girl named Alex who could kill with a single touch, and a telepath named Lily. Believing they had too many characters, the writers combined Alex and Lily into one. Gamble had envisioned the episode as a "psychic Breakfast Club", so the new Lily's motivation was that she was Ally Sheedy. The Acheri demon responsible for two of the psychic children's deaths was based on the Acheri from Hindu mythology; writer Sera Gamble felt that it being a "diseased spirit" that comes down from the mountains and "kills everybody in the settlements" fit in with the abandoned mountain-side town where the episode takes place. Harvelle's Roadhouse—a saloon frequented by demon hunters—was dropped from the show in these episodes as well, as Kripke disliked the concept of having a fixed home for a road-based series. With the Roadhouse's destruction came the death of recurring character Ash, whom the writers had been phasing out during the season because they felt his "comical" and "wacky" personality was too unrealistic for the show.

With John Winchester making a demonic pact in the second-season premiere, it was decided early on to end the season with another demonic pact. This required the writers to kill Sam—they felt it was the only thing that could motivate Dean to sell his soul—with the pact becoming one of the driving forces behind the third season. At the same time, it opened up another new storyline by questioning if what returned was "one hundred percent pure Sam." Additionally, the "war of demons against humanity"—hinted at throughout the first two seasons—finally started with the release of demons through the Devil's Gate at the end of the second episode. This plotline continues throughout the rest of the series, with the Winchesters attempting to hunt down the demons in the third season.

While the final version of "Part Two" is quite enclosed, the initial script was considered epic, with production designer Jerry Wanek jokingly referring to it as a "six-hour mini-series." In the original version, the giant devil's trap keeping demons away from the gateway to Hell was much more complex, with each point in the pentagram being a church housing a holy relic—such as a sliver from the True Cross. With the artifacts powering the devil's trap, Jake's role would have been to go to each church and destroy them, the hunters following after him to try to stop him. Jake would then eventually destroy the final relic during a fight with Sam, and Dean would race to the gateway to prevent Azazel from opening it while Jake and Sam are "beating the crap out of each other." However, when director and executive producer Kim Manners received the script, he realized it was huge, and had the storyboard artist make five-and-a-half hours of storyboards for the episode to prove it could not be filmed without going hundreds of thousands of dollars over-budget. Production suggested that a large amount of money could be saved by not depicting the churches, which were major set pieces for the intended story. Kripke realized that instead of using churches, he could have the points of the pentagram be connected by railroad tracks. With tracks being made of iron, it fit perfectly with the series mythology because iron is a demon deterrent. Kripke found this aspect to be more Western, matching the tone of show. Rather than destroying the devil's trap as in the original script, Jake is instead sent by Azazel to open the gateway himself, and the major fight scene between Jake and Sam was then changed into a standoff between Jake and the hunters. Though the storyline had to be toned down, Kripke felt this improved the overall episode by making it simpler.

=== Filming ===
The second episode's cemetery scene had to be filmed on a sound stage because of weather problems.

Filming for the first episode lasted for a period of nine days. The diner at the beginning of the episode was built by Wanek, though a pre-existing set—a deserted town built for the Western television series Bordertown that is filmed in the Vancouver area—was used for seven days of filming. Originally, the episode was meant to mainly take place in an abandoned orphanage with many hallways. However, producer Cyrus Yavneh had sent Kripke photos of the Bordertown set during production of Supernatural's first season, and the "creepy" and "evocative" aspects of the town prompted the writers to change the setting. With the new location, references to the ghost town of Dudleytown, Connecticut were going to be included in the script, but were eventually edited out. Unfortunately for production, the Bordertown set was surrounded by mountains on one side and farmland on the other, making it difficult for the production team to access. It also rained all seven days, causing problems during filming. However, director Robert Singer felt the gray skies and mist ended up helping the episode's appearance.

The second episode's climax was originally to take place in an actual cemetery, but problems at the potential filming locations prohibited this. The scene takes place at night which, at that time of year, lasts only nine and a half hours in Vancouver. With only four nights to film the sequence, production came up with the idea of having a "supernatural solar eclipse" so the scenes could be shot day for night. However, the first location did not have trees, which were needed for the technique to work. Eventually the team found a cemetery that did have trees, but a rainstorm during inspection forced them to realize weather would interfere with the filming. It was decided at the last minute to film on a sound stage, and a set was constructed. However, the bark mulch used for the cemetery contained manure, which made it very rancid. According to actress Samantha Ferris it "stunk so bad your eyes watered."

=== Effects ===
Morgan's return had to be filmed in advance using blue screen due to his busy schedule. Jared Padalecki, covered in blood in the above picture, had to reshoot his part when script changes had his character uninjured.

As with all other episodes, visual effects were done in-studio. Production wanted to keep the number of shots to a minimum for the opening of the Devil's Gate at the second episode's climax, so instead of just digitally creating demon smoke shots, visual effects supervisor Ivan Hayden filmed stand-ins dressed as characters from past episodes—Woman in White, Hook Man, and the Reaper—on a blue screen and inserted them into the scene in post-production during brief flashes of lightning. This filming technique also had to be used for the return of John Winchester. Actor Jeffrey Dean Morgan was busy filming the movie The Accidental Husband during the episode's scheduled shooting, so he, Jensen Ackles, and Jared Padalecki filmed the scene six weeks earlier in front of a blue screen. The reunion was intended to be "more complex with a lot of fighting", but the movie's production crew believed Morgan would be at risk of getting injured and forbade it. Kripke trimmed the scene, removing Morgan's dialogue and having him only thrown to the ground. The script was not yet complete during the scene's filming, so Padalecki's appearance was based on the original storyline in which Sam has a brutal fight with Jake and ends up covered in blood. When the fight scene was removed, Padalecki had to re-film his part of the family reunion using tennis balls and a stand-in as replacements for Ackles and Morgan who were not available.

=== Music ===
As is typical for the series, the synthesized orchestral score of the episodes was written alternately by Jay Gruska and Christopher Lennertz, with the former working on "Part One" and the latter scoring "Part Two". Because he had worked on the pilot episode of the series—where he introduced a recurring musical theme for scenes related to the villain Azazel—Lennertz was happy to be the one to score the episode featuring the demon's death, allowing him to "close that chapter". With the opening of the gateway to Hell at the episode's end, Lennertz felt that the music "became much larger in scope" than previous episodes, deeming it "an issue of making things larger than life". As with most episodes of the series, classic rock music is also included.

== Reception ==
In its original broadcast, "Part One" was viewed by an estimated 2.9 million viewers, with "Part Two" bringing in approximately 2.72 million viewers. Compared to the rest of the second season, "Part Two" became the lowest-rated episode behind "Born Under a Bad Sign", which received only 2.84 million viewers. Despite this, the episodes garnered positive reviews from critics. Tina Charles of TV Guide found "so much goodness" in the first episode, and called Dean's speech to Sam "rip-your-heart-out sad." She deemed the second episode just plain "wow," praising both the brotherly relationship depicted and the scenes between Jensen Ackles and Jim Beaver, but was disappointed that the brothers did not converse with the spirit of John Winchester after he escapes from Hell. Of particular interest to critics was the wrapping up the Azazel story arc, described by Charles as a "great way to cap off the season." Kathie Huddleston of Sci-fi.com noted that the "terrific" finale closed Sam and Dean's "dad issues and their Yellow-Eyed Demon issues" while opening up new problems for them to face, while TV Squad said it had a "weight and importance that a good finale should have." TV Squad also said that in "Part Two," the show handled Sam's coming back well, though it was apparent he would from "Part One." The actors' performances were also applauded, with Ona Grauer being deemed "delightful" as the Crossroads Demon, coming across as something of a "supernatural used-car salesman." Frederic Lehne received praise for his portrayal of the demon Azazel, described as "riveting," "great," and "appropriately creepy."

However, Tom Burns of Underground Online had previously criticized Supernatural for ruining a surprise ending by giving it away in the show's recap. For "Part One," he noted that its ending was given away in the CW's preview for the episode which showed Sam stabbed in the back and collapsing into Dean's arms. Burns liked the episode, but did find some fault with it. He felt that "Part One" focusing on Sam and "Part Two" on Dean was a mistake since "Supernatural's strongest asset has always been the chemistry between the leads." In addition, Burns felt the season had set up the question of whether Sam was going to "go evil," and the finale did not follow through, which Burns described as a "tease."

Jessica Harmon gained a Leo Award nomination for "Best Guest Performance by a Female in a Dramatic Series" for her role as Lily in "Part One."
