= Supernatural season 2 =

Season of television series

Supernatural
- Season 2
- DVD cover art
- Showrunner: Eric Kripke
- Starring: Jared Padalecki; Jensen Ackles
- No. of episodes: 22

Release
- Original network: The CW
- Original release: September 28, 2006 – May 17, 2007

Season chronology
- ← Previous; Season 1 Next → Season 3

The second season of Supernatural, an American dark fantasy television series created by Eric Kripke, premiered on September 28, 2006, and concluded on May 17, 2007, airing 22 episodes. The season focuses on protagonists Sam (Jared Padalecki) and Dean Winchester (Jensen Ackles) as they track down Azazel, the demon responsible for the deaths of their mother Mary and father John. They attempt to discover the demon's plan for Sam and other psychic children—young adults who were visited by Azazel as infants and given abilities, and whose mothers often then died in a fire. During their travels, they use their father's journal to help them carry on the family business—saving people and hunting supernatural creatures.

The season aired on Thursdays at 9:00 pm ET in the United States, and was the first season to air on The CW television network, a joint venture of The WB and UPN. The previous season was broadcast on The WB. It averaged only about 3.14 million American viewers, and was in danger of not being renewed. The show gained mostly positive reviews, with the cast and crew garnering many award nominations and praise being given towards the brotherly chemistry between the two leads, however the formulaic structure of the episodes was criticized.

The season was internationally syndicated, airing in the United Kingdom on ITV, in Canada on Citytv and SPACE, and in Australia on Network Ten. It was released on DVD as a six-disc box set September 11, 2007, by Warner Home Video in Region 1. Although the season was split into two separate releases in Region 2, the complete set was released on October 29, 2007, and in Region 4 on October 3, 2007. The episodes are also available through digital retailers such as Apple's iTunes Store, Microsoft's Xbox Live Marketplace (now Microsoft Store), and Amazon.com's on-demand TV service.

== Cast ==
=== Main ===
- Jared Padalecki as Sam Winchester (Note: Additionally, Padalecki also portrayed the demon Meg possessing Sam in the episode "Born Under a Bad Sign".)
- Jensen Ackles as Dean Winchester

=== Recurring ===
- Jim Beaver as Bobby Singer
- Alona Tal as Jo Harvelle
- Chad Lindberg as Ash
- Samantha Ferris as Ellen Harvelle

=== Guest ===
- Jeffrey Dean Morgan as John Winchester
- Lindsey McKeon as Tessa
- Fredric Lehne as Azazel
- Sterling K. Brown as Gordon Walker
- Amber Benson as Lenore
- Gabriel Tigerman as Andrew Gallagher
- Katharine Isabelle as Ava Wilson
- Chris Gauthier as Ron Reznick
- Charles Malik Whitfield as FBI Agent Victor Henriksen
- Richard Speight Jr. as the Trickster
- Samantha Smith as Mary Winchester
- Adrianne Palicki as Jessica Moore
- Aldis Hodge as Jake Talley

== Episodes ==
In this table, the number in the first column refers to the episode's number within the entire series, whereas the number in the second column indicates the episode's number within this particular season. "U.S. viewers in millions" refers to how many Americans watched the episode live or on the day of broadcast.

No. overall	No. in season	Title	Directed by	Written by	Original release date	Prod. code	U.S. viewers (millions)
23	1	"In My Time of Dying"	Kim Manners	Eric Kripke	September 28, 2006	3T5501	3.93
The Winchesters are taken to a hospital in Memphis, Tennessee following a car wreck caused by one of the demon Azazel's henchmen. Sam and his father John (Jeffrey Dean Morgan) sustain minor injuries while Dean is in a coma. He has an out-of-body experience, and is approached by a Reaper (Lindsey McKeon) who tries to take his soul. She reveals that if he refuses to move on, he will one day become a vengeful spirit. John contacts Azazel (Fredric Lehne) and offers to exchange Dean's life for his own life, his immortal soul, and the mystical Colt—a gun capable of killing anything. Dean is saved, and after making peace with his sons, John dies.
24	2	"Everybody Loves a Clown"	Phil Sgriccia	John Shiban	October 5, 2006	3T5502	3.34
After cremating their father's body, Sam and Dean refuse to discuss his death. Instead, they head back to work and track an old message on John's phone to Harvelle's Roadhouse, a bar frequented by hunters. There they meet Ellen Harvelle (Samantha Ferris), an old friend of John's, and her daughter Jo (Alona Tal). Ash (Chad Lindberg), attempts to analyze John's research on Azazel with his computer and the brothers investigate the murders of visitors to a traveling carnival, currently near Medford, Wisconsin. They discover that a Rakshasa—a demon of Hindu mythology—has been taking the form of a clown and tricking children into inviting it into their homes so that it can eat their parents. When not feeding, it takes the form of a blind knife thrower at the carnival. The brothers kill it with a brass pipe. Dean later takes out his anger at his father's death on the Impala, one of his most prized possessions.
25	3	"Bloodlust"	Robert Singer	Sera Gamble	October 12, 2006	3T5503	3.78
Having repaired the Impala, the brothers investigate a series of decapitations and cattle mutilations in Red Lodge, Montana, and find that the last victim was a vampire. They encounter a vampire hunter Gordon Walker (Sterling K. Brown), who Ellen warns is dangerous. Sam is captured by a group of vampires, and their leader, Lenore (Amber Benson), reveals that they have reformed, feeding only on cattle. After being released unharmed, Sam tries to convince his brother that the vampires should be left alone. When they arrive at the vampire's hideout, they find that Gordon has captured Lenore. They try to convince Gordon not to kill her, but he cuts Sam's arm to tempt the vampire. When Lenore resists the temptation, the brothers overpower him. As Dean ties Gordon up, Sam takes Lenore to safety. Dean later admits to Sam that he was wrong about the vampires.
26	4	"Children Shouldn't Play with Dead Things"	Kim Manners	Raelle Tucker	October 19, 2006	3T5504	3.29
As Sam buries their father's dog tags at their mother's grave, Dean notices dead plants at the nearby grave of a recently deceased young woman named Angela Mason (Tamara Feldman). They discover that the woman's cheating boyfriend was murdered the previous night. Sam and Dean dig up her grave and find the coffin empty. They deduce that her close friend Neil (Christopher Jacot), who was secretly in love with her, resurrected her as a zombie. Having killed her boyfriend, her next target is her roommate, with whom her boyfriend had been cheating. Sam and Dean save the woman and lure the zombie back to the graveyard to kill it with a silver stake. Dean apologizes to Sam for his recent behavior and reveals he has had trouble coping with his guilt over their father's death.
27	5	"Simon Said"	Tim Iacofano	Ben Edlund	October 26, 2006	3T5505	3.65
Sam has a vision of a man committing a murder-suicide. Ash helps the brothers track down Andy Gallagher (Gabriel Tigerman), whose mother was killed in the same manner as their own mother—dying in a nursery fire. They go to Guthrie, Oklahoma, and Sam is able to stop the murder, although the man still ends up killing himself. The brothers locate Andy and learn that he has mind-control abilities and believe he forced the man to commit suicide. Sam has another vision of a woman's suicide, and it comes to pass while they are talking to Andy, exonerating him. After learning that Andy was adopted and that the woman who killed herself is his biological mother, they conduct research and discover that Andy has a twin brother named Ansen (Elias Toufexis) that he never knew about. Ansen has been using the same ability out of anger to kill those connected to the adoption that separated them. He targets Andy's ex-girlfriend, and the Winchesters rush to save her. However, Andy ends up killing his twin to save Dean, making Sam realize that every child connected to Azazel becomes a killer. They return to the Roadhouse and Ash reveals that Ansen's adoptive mother did not die when he was an infant, meaning not every psychic child follows a traceable pattern.
28	6	"No Exit"	Kim Manners	Matt Witten	November 2, 2006	3T5506	3.38
Ellen will not allow Jo to investigate mysterious disappearances of blonde women in an apartment building. Sam and Dean take the case and go to Philadelphia, Pennsylvania, and Jo follows them to help. They find ectoplasm in the latest victim's apartment and realize that a ghost is behind the kidnappings. Jo's research shows that America's first serial killer, H. H. Holmes (Stephen Aberle), was executed and buried on the location where the apartment building was later built. Jo is captured by the spirit, and the brothers find the ghost's lair in the sewer system under the building. They free Jo and another kidnapped woman, then trap the spirit within a ring of salt. When Jo is reunited with her mother, an angry Ellen reveals that Jo's father died while on a hunt with John Winchester.
29	7	"The Usual Suspects"	Mike Rohl	Cathryn Humphris	November 9, 2006	3T5507	3.19
The brothers investigate the murders of a lawyer and his wife in Baltimore, Maryland. They are arrested, but Sam manages to escape. A detective, Diana Ballard (Linda Blair), sees an apparition of a murdered woman and helps Sam discover that the woman is a missing heroin dealer who was working as a police informant. To put the spirit to rest, they must burn her body, and the woman appears and leads them to it, hidden within a wall. A necklace on the body points to Diana's partner, Det. Pete Sheridan (Jason Gedrick), as the woman's murderer. Sam realizes that the woman's spirit was actually a death omen warning Diana. Pete takes Dean from the police station and drives him into the woods to kill him. Sam and Diana track them and Pete admits to killing the woman after convincing her to sell heroin that he had stolen, and later killed the lawyer who laundered the money and his wife who knew about the situation. The spirit returns and distracts him long enough for Diana to kill him, then disappears.
30	8	"Crossroad Blues"	Steve Boyum	Sera Gamble	November 16, 2006	3T5508	3.16
Sam and Dean investigate a suicide and believe a black dog may be involved. They discover that the man worked at a bar ten years earlier but became successful in architecture. They realize that the dog was a hellhound sent to collect his soul because the man agreed to a demonic pact to gain his talent. The demon also made deals with other people, so the brothers track down one of them, learning that he gave up his soul to cure his wife of cancer. As Sam stays behind to protect the man from the hellhound, Dean summons the demon at a crossroads and tricks it into stepping into a devil's trap. Dean starts an exorcism and, in exchange for her freedom, the demon releases the man from his deal. Before she leaves, she taunts Dean about his father's deal, revealing that John is suffering in Hell.
31	9	"Croatoan"	Robert Singer	John Shiban	December 7, 2006	3T5509	3.12
Sam has a premonition of Dean killing a defenseless man, in which the brothers investigate in Rivergrove, Oregon. Sam notices "CROATOAN" carved into a pole, reminding him of the lost colony of Roanoke. They find that all forms of communication have been shut down and extremely violent townspeople are blocking the roads out. A doctor finds that the blood of the violent people has been infected by a virus containing sulfur, leading Sam to believe Croatoan refers to a demonic plague. Moments later, all of the infected people have suddenly vanished, leaving the town deserted, so the brothers leave the town. Sam has his blood tested and discovers that he was not infected.
32	10	"Hunted"	Rachel Talalay	Raelle Tucker	January 11, 2007	3T5510	3.24
Dean reveals that before their father died, he told him that he has to save Sam if he can, or else kill him. Sam goes to the Roadhouse to try to find more psychic children like himself. Ash's search finds a young man named Scott Carey, but he was murdered a month earlier. Sam heads to Lafayette, Indiana to investigate, and is followed by a young woman named Ava Wilson (Katharine Isabelle). Like Sam, she has premonitions and foresaw Scott's death. She has also been having visions of Sam being killed in an explosion. The two steal Scott's file from a psychiatrist and learn that he spoke to Azazel and was told about an army of psychic children being used in an upcoming war. The vampire hunter, Gordon Walker, learned about Azazel's plans and tries to kill Sam. Dean stops him but is captured by Gordon. Sam remembers Ava's vision and avoids explosive traps. He saves Dean, and police arrest Gordon due to an 'anonymous call' made by Sam. The brothers later go to check on Ava back in her hometown of Peoria, Illinois, but find her fiancé dead, with sulfur on the windowsill pointing to a demonic abduction.
33	11	"Playthings"	Charles Beeson	Matt Witten	January 18, 2007	3T5511	3.44
The brothers investigate deaths at the Pierpont Inn in Cornwall, Connecticut. It is owned by Susan Thompson (Annie Wersching), a single mother who plans to sell it. Living there with her are her mother, Rose (Brenda McDonald), and her daughter, Tyler (Matreya Fedor), who has an imaginary friend named Maggie (Conchita Campbell). The brothers discover that Rose has been practicing hoodoo, but recently suffered from a stroke. Maggie is the ghost of Rose's sister, Margaret, who drowned as a child in the inn's pool. Maggie had been kept at bay by Rose's practice of hoodoo, but has returned since Rose's stroke. Maggie does not want the family to move away, so she tries to drown Tyler so that she can have a friend forever. To save Tyler, Rose gives her own life, taking Tyler's place as Maggie's eternal playmate.
34	12	"Nightshifter"	Phil Sgriccia	Ben Edlund	January 25, 2007	3T5512	3.42
Sam and Dean investigate a series of robbery-suicides in Milwaukee, Wisconsin, that involve employees stealing from their employers and then killing themselves. A former security guard named Ron Reznick (Chris Gauthier) believes the culprit is a "mandroid"—half man, half machine, but the brothers realize that a shapeshifter is responsible. The brothers predict that the next incident will occur at a bank so they pose as security workers to infiltrate the building. Ron arrives at the bank and takes everyone hostage. When they discover the shapeshifter's identity, it runs and Ron gives chase, but is then killed by a police sniper. A hostage then has a heart attack, and Dean takes him to an ambulance outside the bank. Dean is identified, and FBI Agent Victor Henriksen (Charles Malik Whitfield) comes to the location. Henriksen reveals that he has been tracking Dean since an incident in St. Louis the previous year when another shapeshifter framed Dean for attempted murder. Sam and Dean track the shapeshifter and Dean kills it.
35	13	"Houses of the Holy"	Kim Manners	Sera Gamble	February 1, 2007	3T5513	3.37
The brothers investigate murders in Providence, Rhode Island, in which the culprits claim to have been ordered to do so by an angel. They find that the victims were a killer and a pedophile, and that both attended the same church. Sam and Dean learn that a priest had been shot to death outside the church. Sam is visited by the angel, who orders him to kill an evil man. While Dean tracks the angel's target to make sure that the man does not do anything bad, Sam summons the spirit of the priest (David Monahan). The spirit believes himself to be an angel, but another priest (Denis Arndt) at the church convinces him otherwise and puts his soul to rest using the Last Rites. Dean prevents the man from attacking a woman and then chases after him in his car. During the pursuit, the man almost crashes into a truck, and a metal pipe on the truck falls and impales him, which Dean believes may have been God's doing.
36	14	"Born Under a Bad Sign"	J. Miller Tobin	Cathryn Humphris	February 8, 2007	3T5514	2.84
Dean finds Sam, who has been missing for a week, covered in blood and with no memory of what has happened. Security footage depicts Sam murdering a hunter. Sam tries to force Dean to kill him before he hurts someone else. When Dean refuses, Sam knocks him unconscious and leaves. He then finds Jo at her job in Duluth, Minnesota, and begins to sadistically play mind games with her, but Dean arrives before he can physically hurt her. Sam again tries to convince Dean to shoot him, but Dean throws holy water on him, revealing a case of demonic possession. Sam shoots Dean and flees to the South Dakota home of fellow hunter Bobby Singer (Jim Beaver). Bobby tricks Sam into drinking holy water and ties him up under a devil's trap. Dean joins Bobby and tries to exorcise the demon, and Bobby learns that the demon used a binding ritual to bind itself to Sam's body. As the demon frees itself and attacks Dean, it reveals that it is the same demon that formerly resided within Meg Masters, wanting revenge for exorcising it. Bobby slashes the binding mark on Sam with a hot iron poker, and the demon is forced to flee.
37	15	"Tall Tales"	Bradford May	John Shiban	February 15, 2007	3T5515	3.03
Sam and Dean's investigation of urban legends coming to life on a college campus in Springfield, Ohio, stalls and they ask Bobby for help. Bobby figures out that a Pagan trickster—a demigod capable of manipulating reality—is responsible and is pitting Sam and Dean against each other with the various pranks they thought the other was committing. They confront the janitor (Richard Speight Jr.) of the building near where the manifestations had occurred, who reveals that he is the trickster. The hunters attack him and Dean apparently kills him, but it is later revealed that the trickster faked his death.
38	16	"Roadkill"	Charles Beeson	Raelle Tucker	March 15, 2007	3T5516	3.52
As Molly McNamara (Tricia Helfer) and her husband David McNamara (Dan Gauthier) drive along a highway, a man suddenly appears in the road. They crash in an attempt to avoid him, and Molly later wakes up alone in the car. The man reappears and chases after her, but Molly flags down a car driven by the Winchesters. She tries to show them the wreck, but the car has disappeared. While driving to the police, they are again confronted by the man, but Dean drives through him, causing the ghost to dissipate. The brothers reveal that the spirit was Jonah Greeley (Winston Rekert), who died on that roadway fifteen years earlier and now kills drivers on the anniversary of his death. The trio locates Greeley's home, digs up his corpse, and burns the body. The Winchesters explain to Molly that she died in the same car accident that killed Greeley but was reliving the same night since her death fifteen years prior. She accepts the truth and moves on.
39	17	"Heart"	Kim Manners	Sera Gamble	March 22, 2007	3T5517	3.38
The brothers investigate werewolf attacks in San Francisco, California, and meet Madison (Emmanuelle Vaugier), the secretary of the latest victim. After speaking to her, they suspect that her ex-boyfriend Kurt is the werewolf. Dean searches for him while Sam protects Madison. Madison transforms into a werewolf and sneaks out; she attempts to kill Kurt, but Dean arrives to find Kurt dead and chases Madison away. The next day, the brothers deduce that she had been infected during an apparent mugging the previous month. According to werewolf lore, a werewolf will return to normal if his or her "sire" dies. Dean is able to kill the sire, who is revealed to be Madison’s neighbor. When she does not change the next night, they believe the curse has been lifted. Sam and Madison have sex the following night, but she transforms once again and flees. Not wanting to live as a monster and with no known cure, Madison convinces a distraught Sam to kill her.
40	18	"Hollywood Babylon"	Phil Sgriccia	Ben Edlund	April 19, 2007	3T5518	3.25
When a stagehand is killed by a spirit on the set of a horror film, Sam and Dean head to Los Angeles to investigate. They speak with the actress that witnessed the phenomena, whom Dean is a personal fan of and later had sex with. They then learn that it was only a publicity stunt, but a studio executive (Gary Cole) soon dies at the hands of a ghostly woman—a young actress who committed suicide in the 1930s after being seduced and then fired by a studio executive. Though the brothers salt and burn her remains, another producer is killed. Sam then notices that the Latin used in the film's script is an actual summoning ritual. The writer, Martin Flagg (Michael B. Silver), tells them that the rituals are from the original script written by production assistant Walter Dixon (Benjamin Ratner). They confront Walter, who admits that he has been summoning spirits to get revenge against the people he believes ruined his script. He destroys the talisman used in the rituals, but the now free spirits kill him for what he did.
41	19	"Folsom Prison Blues"	Mike Rohl	John Shiban	April 26, 2007	3T5519	3.33
Following a tip from their father's marine buddy, Deacon, Sam, and Dean deliberately get themselves arrested in Arkansas to investigate murders in a recently reopened cell block. FBI Agent Henriksen arrives and attempts to extradite them. Their public defender, Mara Daniels (Bridget Ann White), believes that they may have been falsely accused of many crimes, but says that they can only stall extradition for a week. The spirit of a nurse attacks Dean in the infirmary, and she kills another prisoner. Research reveals that it is Nurse Glockner, who used to kill infirmary patients and was later killed in a riot. She kills anyone who has committed a crime, regardless of how minor it is. Dean convinces Mara to locate where Glockner was buried, and the brothers decide to follow their escape plan. After getting into a fight with one another, they are taken away by a guard (Garwin Sanford)—Deacon, who helps them escape. The brothers dig up Glockner's body and then salt and burn her remains.
42	20	"What Is and What Should Never Be"	Eric Kripke	Raelle Tucker	May 3, 2007	3T5520	3.11
Dean is attacked by a djinn, and finds himself in a world in which his mother had never been killed by Azazel. He and Sam were not brought up as hunters, and thus are no longer close. Dean enjoys his new life but a ghostly young woman seems to be haunting him. When he realizes that all the people that he and Sam had saved as hunters are now dead, he decides that he must give up his newfound happiness to save them. Though Sam does not believe him, he accompanies his brother to the djinn's lair. There Dean discovers that the young woman he has been seeing is a victim of the creature. Noticing that she is alive but hallucinating —a way for the djinn to keep its victims captive while it feeds off their blood —Dean realizes that he, too, is within an illusory world. Dean kills himself in the dream, waking himself in the real world where Sam rescues him. Sam and Dean battle the djinn and Dean kills it. They discover the other victim is still alive and take her to the hospital where she is expected to recover.
43	21	"All Hell Breaks Loose (Part 1)"	Robert Singer	Sera Gamble	May 10, 2007	3T5521	2.90
Sam is abducted by Azazel and taken to an abandoned town. Also placed there are Azazel's other psychic children—Andy Gallagher and Ava Wilson, as well as newcomers Lily (Jessica Harmon) and Jake Talley (Aldis Hodge). Dean and Bobby head to the Roadhouse discover it burned to the ground with the body of Ash buried in the wreckage. Andy uses his mind-control abilities to send Dean his location telepathically. Sam is visited in a dream by Azazel, who explains that he has brought them together so they could fight to the death, with the sole survivor becoming the leader of his army of demons. Ava uses a new demon-controlling ability and forces an Acheri demon to kill Lily and Andy. She reveals to Sam that she has been in the town since she went missing, killing off other psychic children that Azazel has sent there. She sets the Acheri demon on him, but Jake uses his superhuman strength to break her neck, causing the demon to flee. Jake attacks Sam as Azazel but Sam knocks him unconscious. As Sam is distracted by an arriving Dean and Bobby, Jake regains consciousness and fatally stabs him. Sam dies in Dean's arms.
44	22	"All Hell Breaks Loose (Part 2)"	Kim Manners	Story by : Eric Kripke & Michael T. Moore; Teleplay by : Eric Kripke	May 17, 2007	3T5522	2.72
Dean, devastated by Sam's death, sells his soul to a Crossroads Demon (Ona Grauer) in exchange for Sam's resurrection and is given only one year before collection is due. Ellen arrives at Bobby's home and gives them a map of Wyoming that Ash had left in the Roadhouse's safe. Research reveals that Samuel Colt—creator of the Colt gun—created a giant devil's trap using railway lines. At the trap's center is an old cowboy cemetery, which Azazel forces Jake to go to. The hunters are there to meet him, but Jake uses the Colt as a key to open a mausoleum. Sam then shoots Jake. As the mausoleum doors open, they realize that it is a Devil's Gate —a doorway to Hell. A rush of demons escape and break the iron railway lines of the devil's trap, allowing Azazel to enter. As Ellen and Bobby try to close the gateway, Sam and Dean take the Colt to confront Azazel. The demon surprises them and takes the gun. Azazel prepares to kill them, but the spirit of John Winchester grabs him. This distraction allows Dean to take back the Colt and fatally shoot the demon in the heart. As Bobby and Ellen close the gates, John's spirit moves on. Sam also promises to find a way to save Dean after he admits to him about his deal.

== Production ==
=== Casting ===
The writers used the second season to expand upon the concept of hunters, resulting in the introduction of many recurring characters through the hunter-frequented saloon—Harvelle's Roadhouse. Samantha Ferris portrayed Ellen Harvelle, proprietor of the Roadhouse and an old friend of John Winchester, while Alona Tal played Ellen's daughter Jo. This pair complemented the father-son relationship of the Winchesters in the first year. Ferris believes she was exactly what the producers were looking for: a "tough, strong, yet a little maternal actor". Tal's character, on the other hand, was an intended love interest for Dean, and was eventually phased out because she came off as more of a sister figure. Chad Lindberg portrayed the genius Ash, who uses his vast computer skills to track the paranormal. Because the writers felt the character's "comical" and "wacky" personality was too unrealistic for the show, he was also removed by the finale.

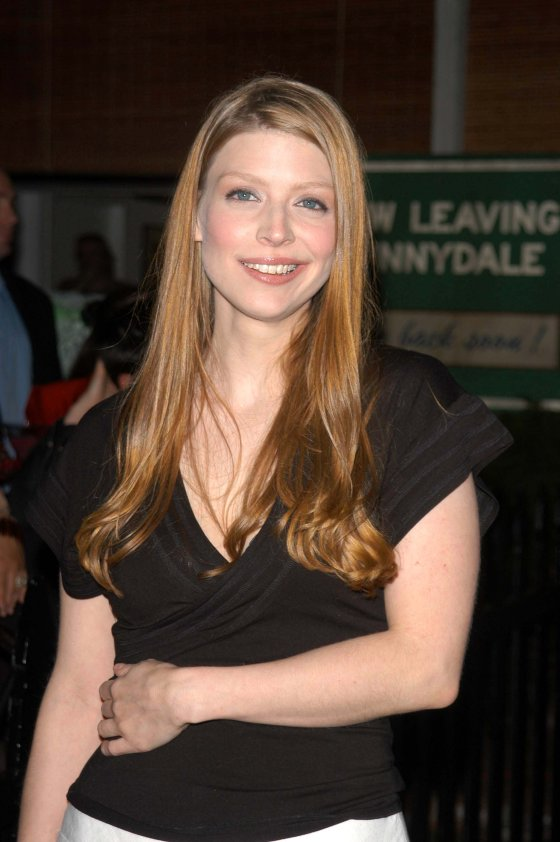
Amber Benson, best known for her role of the witch Tara Maclay on Buffy the Vampire Slayer, was specifically chosen to portray the vampire Lenore in "Bloodlust".

Other characters returned from the first year. Actor Jim Beaver made multiple appearances as hunter Bobby Singer, an old family friend of the Winchesters. Beaver had expected his first-season guest appearance in "Devil's Trap" to be a "one-shot deal", and was surprised when he was asked to return. Adrianne Palicki reprised her role as Sam's deceased girlfriend Jessica in the alternate-reality episode "What Is and What Should Never Be", as did Samantha Smith as Mary Winchester. Smith also made an appearance in a flashback in the penultimate episode, "All Hell Breaks Loose, Part One". And though at first reluctant because of his role on Grey's Anatomy, Jeffrey Dean Morgan returned as John Winchester in the season premiere and finale. However, the character dies in the premiere because the writers worried that having him separated from his sons again—Sam and Dean spend much of the first season tracking him down—would "split the show" by having him away "doing more interesting things than the boys are doing". As a demon, the villain Azazel periodically switches hosts, and was first fully portrayed by Morgan in the first-season finale. The reins passed to Fredric Lehne for the second-season premiere, and the show's producers enjoyed his performance so much they brought him back for the two-part finale.

Many factors went into the casting decisions of the season's guest stars. Linda Blair, famous for her role in the horror film The Exorcist, appeared in the episode "The Usual Suspects". Though a fan of the show, Blair had turned down a guest appearance in the first season because she did not want to return to horror, having spent years getting a "clean slate". This changed after the television series Extra aired a three-part profile on her acting career and work with animals. It attempted to find a series that would write a role for her as "an actor's piece", rather than a cameo. Kripke, a fan of The Exorcist, offered to write an episode specifically for her, and she was "really touched" when he listened to her request to leave out demons in the storyline. During automated dialogue replacement, Jensen Ackles added in a reference to The Exorcist with the statement, "I could really go for some pea soup."

The casting of Battlestar Galactica's Tricia Helfer in "Roadkill" stemmed from the producers' preference to hire actors important to Supernatural's fanbase. This was the first episode to have the Winchesters as supporting characters, and Kripke felt "Tricia had the charisma to perform the leading role". Kripke enjoyed Emmanuelle Vaugier's work in television series such as Smallville, and believed she was an "easy choice" for the large role of the soon-to-be werewolf Madison in "Heart". Director Kim Manners felt Vaugier brought to the character a vulnerability like that of Lon Chaney Jr. in The Wolf Man, which made viewers sympathetic. Conspiracy-theorist Ronald of "Nightshifters" was envisioned by writer and consulting producer Ben Edlund as the unsympathetic "semi-drunk Randy Quaid from Independence Day". However, this changed with Chris Gauthier's casting, and Edlund felt that Ronald turned out to be a "really cool" character fans would enjoy. The producers considered Summer Glau for the role of the zombie Angela for "Children Shouldn't Play with Dead Things", but she could not accept due to scheduling conflicts.

=== Writing ===
As much as I love season one, we actually had a pretty formulaic structure. There'd be an obituary that would take the guys into a town, they'd do a little research, they'd have a skirmish with the monster, they'd meet a girl, they'd have a showdown with the monster, they'd learn something about themselves, and then they'd roll out of town again. Pretty much every episode had that structure. And we worried that the viewers would get bored with the show if we did that again for a whole other season.

— Kripke on the decision to change the series formula.

When production of the second season started, Kripke wanted to avoid the monster-of-the-week formula used in the first year. The writers attempted this by including more "human themes," mainly "the things Sam and Dean are truly afraid of: death, grief, betrayal, etc." This change brought the series' focus onto situations such as the brothers dealing with their father's death and giving them the task of hunting down Azazel, the demon who killed him. Morgan feels that the brothers' "inner turmoil" created by the death of his character made them more three-dimensional. While Dean has trouble dealing with his father's death, Kripke wishes they had focused more on Sam's reaction. Instead, the episodes dealt more with Sam's fear of becoming evil, which Kripke regretted since the writers never depicted the character committing malevolent acts. Another main storyline of the season followed Sam and Dean as they track down the various psychic children—young adults like Sam who were visited by Azazel as infants and given abilities. However, the psychic children storyline made the mythology of the second season "dense" and "confusing" for Kripke.

Kripke instead favored the "unique and structurally interesting" self-enclosed episodes, which sometimes arose from the writers' unused ideas. From the series' beginning, Kripke desired to feature an evil clown because he felt that "clowns in a context where they're not supposed to be are friggin' terrifying". To fit with the series, the clown became a shapeshifting Rakshasa of Hindu mythology. This decision made the clown "less satisfying", to Kripke's chagrin, because it limited the clown-related scenes. Another element of folklore favored by Kripke was the story of Robert Johnson, which he focused on in his first screenplay as a writer. He found the legend similar to Supernatural, noting, "It's a piece of real life American history and folklore, it's an American horror story, it takes place on the dusty back roads of rural America, and it's got great music." However, the lore takes place in the early 20th century, and prevented the inclusion of Sam and Dean. To circumvent this, writer Sera Gamble suggested Johnson's story be made into a subplot detailed in flashbacks, with the Crossroads Demon returning in the present to make more deals. Although Gamble envisioned the demon's hellhound as being similar in appearance to a Rottweiler, Kripke felt it would "look stupid". The creature was instead made invisible, which Gamble believes gave it a more terrifying presence.

Before he entered the television industry, writer and consulting producer Ben Edlund had wanted to pen a metafictional script dealing with television production, but decided against it because he did not have production knowledge. He later returned to it for the episode "Hollywood Babylon". Edlund decided to have the production staff look like "goofballs", and made fun of Supernatural's production staff, the network, and the studio. For example, comments made by Gary Cole's "studio suit" character were based on notes from the network and studio for Supernatural during both seasons of production. Other metafictional references include a character commenting on the "terrible script" of Boogeyman, a film written by Kripke; Sam becoming uncomfortable as the studio tour passes the set of Gilmore Girls, a television series in which Padalecki had a recurring role; and Sam proclaiming Hollywood's weather to be "positively Canadian".

Other stories were developed from simple concepts. For example, the reformed-vampire episode "Bloodlust" was developed to suggest that all monsters should not be killed indiscriminately. The plot alluded to "racial issues", but not blatantly; rather, as Padalecki noted, they explored it in a "fun way". The episode "The Usual Suspects" emerged from the writers' desire to keep the audience guessing. Cathryn Humphris pitched a story with a ghost serving as a death omen—warning people of future tragedy, rather than trying to kill them, unlike previous ghosts on the series. However, Humphris had trouble developing the script's outline. Kripke noted a part of the episode in which brothers are arrested and have to explain to police what had happened; this scenario ultimately became the framework of the episode, which begins with Sam and Dean being taken into custody. The concept for "Tall Tales" originated as a "he said, he said" episode, in which the brothers would recount conflicting versions of the same storyline. The writers deliberated over the use of five or six monsters in trying to find one appropriate for the episode, but eventually settled on a trickster because it "can do everything [they] want it to". Although the writers typically prefer to put their own spin on folklore, they decided in this case to remain faithful to the archetypal trickster mythos. Because the season alluded to the possibility of Sam becoming bad, the writers wanted to portray how an evil Sam would behave and what Dean's reaction would be. One of the writers' first creative ideas of the season was depicted in the teaser of "Born Under a Bad Sign", in which a blood-covered Sam wakes up not remembering the past week of his life. The plot, which "fell into place" during the writing process, included demonic possession to explain Sam's actions—an event that resulted in the return of the vengeful Meg Masters demon.

After the plotlines were developed, major deviations sometimes occurred in the writing process. Like in the final version of the script, twins with mind-control abilities were the focus of Edlund's original pitch for the episode "Simon Said". However, the more powerful twin—kept secluded due to deformities—forced his brother to perceive himself as retarded. At the end of the episode, his brother ate him in retaliation. The story was eventually changed, and instead focused on questions such as "What do you do with power?". Kripke felt that this fit greatly with the series' storyline, because Sam was uncomfortable with his developing abilities; the writers wanted to explore one of the psychic children who took his ability as a gift. "Folsom Prison Blues" stemmed from Kripke's desire to feature prison ghosts, and the initial plot had FBI Agent Henriksen finally capturing the brothers and sending them to prison. However, this caused a major complication: the writers would have to devise a way for Sam and Dean to escape in the end. Writer John Shiban suggested that the brothers be arrested on purpose in order to work a job, with the prison's head guard being revealed as a family friend.

The two-part finale "All Hell Breaks Loose" brought many storylines to a close. The psychic children were killed off because the writers felt the characters were not as interesting as demons and monsters. The Roadhouse was destroyed due to Kripke's disliking of the concept; he felt it gave a home to the road show. Fearing that he would disappoint fans by creating too much anticipation, Kripke also decided to answer many questions regarding Azazel's plans in "Part One". The second part ended the brothers' quest to kill Azazel, but also opened more storylines for the third season, such as Dean's demonic pact to resurrect Sam and the question of whether what returned was "one hundred percent pure Sam". Additionally, the "war of demons against humanity"—hinted at throughout the first two seasons—finally started at the finale's end.

=== Filming ===
Principal photography took place in Vancouver, British Columbia. The crew used two cameras simultaneously for each scene, which allowed for two different angles to be filmed of the same sequence. The series usually has a dark atmosphere, though production purposefully created a contrasting appearance for certain episodes. "Hollywood Babylon" details the filming of a fake horror movie, and the use of two filming styles helped make a distinction; scenes of the fake film used more saturated colors, while scenes for the actual episode were "down to reality". To depict the perfect world of "What Is and What Should Never Be", the usual shadows and "moody lighting" more made colorful and warm.

Problems during production sometimes arose. For his scenes as the yellow-eyed demon Azazel throughout the season, Fredric Lehne wore hard, colored contact lenses that greatly obscured his vision. The production crew placed sandbags on the floor to help him locate his marks. Lindsey McKeon, who portrayed a Reaper briefly possessed by Azazel in "In My Time of Dying", also experienced the same problem. Her scene—she touches Ackles' forehead—took nine takes to film because she kept missing. Filming for "What Is and What Should Never Be" was interrupted in order to accommodate the busy Adrianne Palicki. Production shifted to the following episode after five days of filming, and resumed when Palicki became available for the final three days.

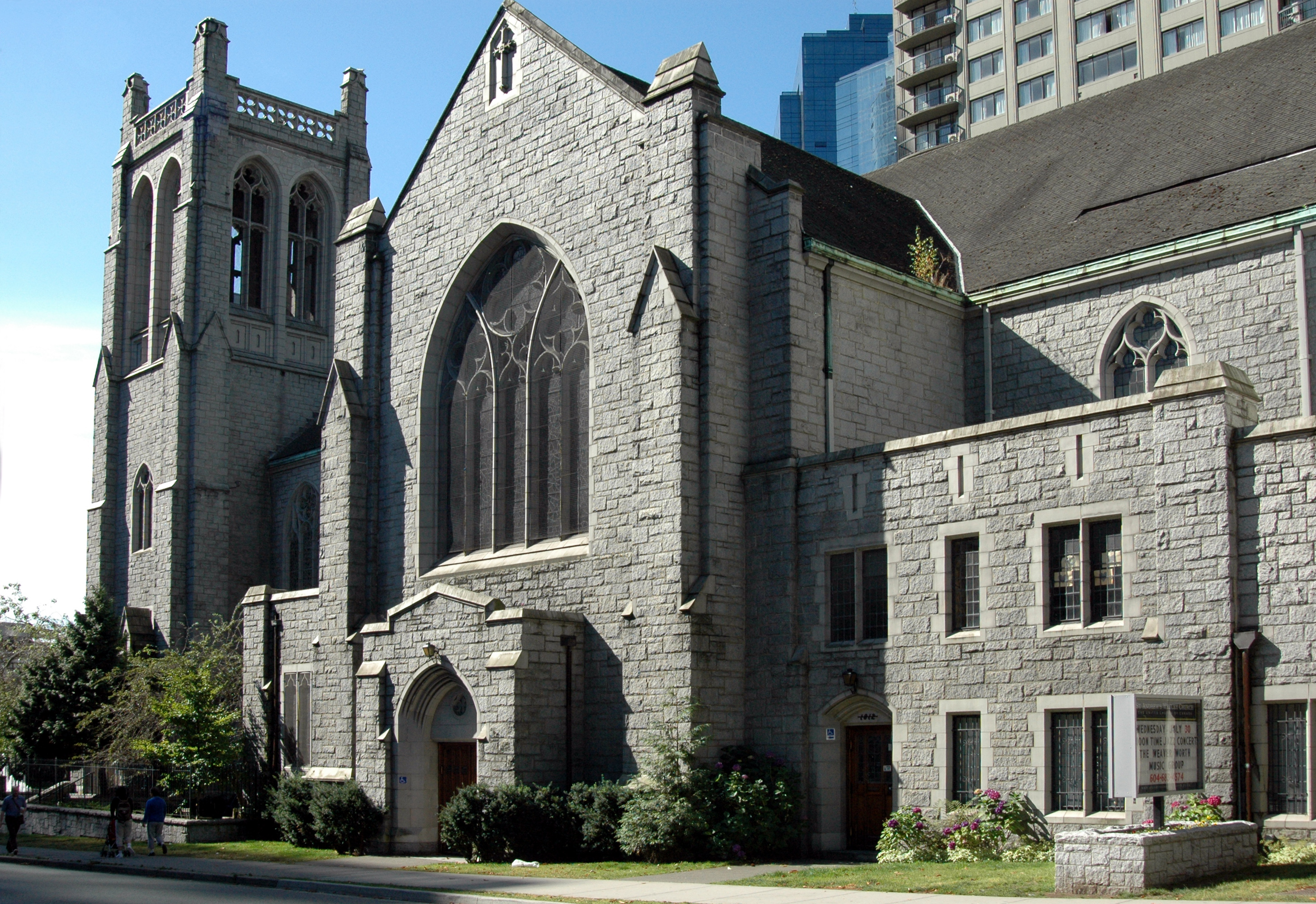
Part of "Houses of the Holy" was filmed at St. Andrew's-Wesley United Church.

Because the series uses few standing sets, set designer Jerry Wanek often had to construct entirely new sets for each episode. Outside elements had an influence on some designs, with the bar in the hotel of "Playthings" being an homage to The Shining. A Wisconsin native, Wanek was able to incorporate personal items into the motel set for the Wisconsin-based episode "Nightshifter"; because polka is part of the state's culture, he used posters from his father's old polka band, as well as photos of his nephews and Wisconsin landmarks. Due to "Tall Tales"'s atmosphere, that episode's motel was designed to be "over the top". Wanek noted, "They were in this really odd-looking motel that had crystal chandeliers and carved beds, turquoise stove and refrigerator, and this wonderful period linoleum on the floor. I thought it really matched the tempo and emotion of the show." At times, however, Wanek was able to reuse old sets. The loft set from "No Exit" was redesigned into an apartment for "Crossroad Blues", and the bar in "Born Under a Bad Sign" was a refurbished Roadhouse set.

Not all scenes could take place in the studio, and some were instead shot on location. The vault scenes in "Nightshifter" were filmed in an actual bank safe, as production would not have been able to construct one on set. Outside shots were filmed in downtown Vancouver, forcing streets to be closed off. The crypt of "Houses of the Holy" was built underneath St. Andrew's-Wesley United Church, with plastic used to imitate sculpted stone. Riverview Hospital—used as a filming location in previous episodes—was used for the premiere "In My Time of Dying". It also functioned as a jail in "Folsom Prison Blues" due to, as Wanek describes, "the texture on the walls, the lack of any humanity in the design, and the materials used to build it..." However, the prison block was built on a sound stage. The final scenes of "Simon Said" were filmed at Cleveland Dam, and "All Hell Breaks Loose, Part One" made use of a pre-existing set built for the Western television series Bordertown. The climax of "Part Two" was originally to take place in an actual cemetery, but numerous issues forced production to film the scene in the studio.

=== Music ===
The mostly synthesized orchestral score of the season was composed by Christopher Lennertz and Jay Gruska. The pair try to base the music on the visuals of each episode, with about a third of each episode's score being newly written for the supernatural legend. For example, when the werewolf's point of view is depicted in "Heart", Gruska tried to make the score predatorial. For "Roadkill"'s emotional ending, Lennertz used cello and piano to "[tug] at the heart strings" and "push the tears". The music was supposed to "become part of the sinister wallpaper" in "In My Time of Dying". Thus, in the scene involving John Winchester selling his soul to Azazel, Gruska wrote the music as "dark and dank", but feels the viewer would only notice the music if it was removed from the scene.

Other musical elements were based on aspects of the episode, and often used less conventional instruments. For "Simon Said"—featuring characters with the ability of mind-control—Gruska tried to make the score more "mind-trippy", opting to mainly use "synthy, spacey electronica pads" to give it a science-fiction sound. Toy-piano sounds were included in "Playthings" by Gruska to make the score more childlike. Because of the Robert Johnson theme of "Crossroad Blues", Lennertz made sure to be specific to Johnson's style when writing the music for the opening scene. A blues guitarist was brought in, and played on a "beat-up old acoustic guitar". However, they added in dissonant notes to foreshadow the "grittiness to come". Lennertz used organ, drums, bass, and guitar to have a "retro bluesy approach" for "Folsom Prison Blues", mimicking the style of film composer David Holmes. Likewise, he wanted the episode "Nightshifter" to have a "feature film feel", with the score ending up similar to The Bourne Identity. With Linda Blair of The Exorcist guest starring in "The Usual Suspects", Gruska used tubular bells as an homage to the film's score.

In addition to the score, the series makes use of rock songs, with most being selected from Kripke's private collection. Among the many bands featured in the second season are AC/DC, Lynyrd Skynyrd, and Boston. Rock songs are also usually featured in "The Road So Far" montages at the beginning of select episodes that recap previous events. The premiere used Ted Nugent's "Stranglehold", and a "coming soon" sequence midway through the season was set to Nazareth's "Hair of the Dog". The finale recapped the entire season to Kansas' "Carry On Wayward Son". The second season also began the tradition of naming many episodes after classic rock songs, with Kripke preferring Led Zeppelin songs.

=== Effects ===
The series makes use of visual, special, and make-up effects, as well as stuntwork. Beginning with the second season, visual effects became an in-house department. Visual effects supervisor Ivan Hayden feels this improved the series because a fixed budget allowed them to compensate for other scenes that lacked effects, such as in "Nightshifter". Wide shots of the bank's exterior—featuring closed-off streets, police, and SWAT helicopters—were accomplished with visual effects. The series' catchphrase—"Scary just got sexy"—was added to a billboard in the background. For the episode "Houses of the Holy", production did not want viewers to be able to determine that the "angel" was in actuality a priest. Thus, the shape engulfed in light was a girl wearing a skintight white leotard. At times, the visual effects used were subtle. Cockroaches were digitally inserted into the sewer scenes of "No Exit"; director Kim Manners did not ask for it, but thought the addition "made it really creepy". The episode "Playthings" featured a scene of a man dying after falling down stairs. The department added blood flowing from underneath him, and also made his fingers twitch and his mouth open and close to create a more lifelike appearance.

The special effects and makeup departments are also important assets to production. Dean has an out-of-body experience in "In My Time of Dying", and some scenes feature him looking at his own body in a hospital bed. To forgo the use of visual effects, the special effects department sculpted a full gelatin face from Ackles, and applied it to a body double. To depict a woman burning to death in the episode "Simon Said", the actress was sealed inside a full body silicone designed to look like her, and was doused with fire accelerant. She was required to breathe through a straw, as well as don underwear soaked in ice-cold fire-retardant gel. Prior to "Heart", Kripke had not wanted to include werewolves in the series, as he felt that the budget would only allow for "a guy with fur glued to his face". As he prefers to have monsters be able to walk among humans, production made the transformation subtle—the character's eyes change, and her canine teeth and fingernails grow. However, writer Sera Gamble believes that they "dropped the ball" in the design, feeling that the creature looked too similar to a vampire.

== Reception ==
Supernatural had low ratings during its second season. Viewers consisted mainly of teenage girls, with the CW trying to attract more males. It ranked No. 216 relative to the position of other prime time network shows. With an average viewership of 3.14 million Americans, the show's future was in doubt at the season's end. Despite this, the series was renewed for a third season. According to Special Forces Soldier Master Sergeant Kevin Wise at a 2007 Supernatural convention, the DVDs most requested by armed forces personnel in Iraq and Afghanistan were the first two seasons of the series.

The second season of the series received positive reviews from critics. The review aggregator website Rotten Tomatoes reported a 100% approval rating with an average rating of 8.20/10 based on 6 reviews. Jim Kaz of IGN gave the season a score at 8/10. While at first hesitant of the series, believing it to be "another horror/sci-fi/occult hybrid currently igniting ratings", he found the "eerie and intricate storylines" to overcome the "initial impressions of Clearasil ads and Paris Hilton in House of Wax". Praising the cliffhangers and the brotherly chemistry between the lead actors, Kaz deemed Supernatural "one-helluva edge-of-your-seat, ball-burner of a series with a forceful script, excellent acting (said pretty boys included) and some fine special effects". Maureen Ryan of the Chicago Tribune thoroughly enjoyed the season, and "really, really liked" the Roadhouse. Not understanding why the Roadhouse was not used more throughout the season, she was "pretty annoyed" when it was destroyed. Ryan also favored the new hunter characters, especially Ash, and was "not thrilled" when Ash was killed. Regarding Sam and Dean, she noted the series' "ability to hone in on [sic] the brotherly conflicts and emotions threaded through a well-plotted monster-of-the-week story". While she enjoyed Tricia Helfer's guest appearance, she did not enjoy the stunt casting of Linda Blair and would have preferred a "more skilled actress". The season received a grade of a B− from Brian Tallerico of UGO, who found it "frustrating" due to the use of the "same predictable formula" that did not meet the standards of the first season. Other problems he found included "the brothers [turning] whiny and mopey and [taking] everything too seriously". However, he believed that the season ended "strong"—he liked how the main storyline was wrapped up, opening new storylines—and noted that there were some "excellent" episodes. Tallerico praised the "tongue-in-cheek Winchester adventure" "The Usual Suspects", feeling that it had "enough pop culture references to make Tarantino jealous" and the "pitch-perfect mix of tones that make the show so great". He also found "Nightshifter" to be the "best action hour of Supernatural's second year", deeming it "riveting from beginning to end". Also applauding the season's cliffhanger was Peter Brown of iFMagazine, who gave the season a B+. He enjoyed the expansion of the series' mythology, as well as the new characters introduced. He also praised the "haunting music and sounds that really give a chilling feel to each and every episode", feeling them to be Emmy-worthy.

The season's cast and crew received the attention of multiple award programs. Writer Raelle Tucker won the Constellation Award for "Best Overall 2007 Science Fiction Film or Television Script" for the episode "What Is and What Should Never Be", and work on "All Hell Breaks Loose, Part Two" garnered a Golden Reel nomination for "Best Sound Editing in Television: Short Form – Sound Effects and Foley". Conchita Campbell gained a Young Artist Award nomination for "Best Performance in a TV Series – Guest Starring Young Actress" for her performance in "Playthings", and Jessica Harmon was nominated in 2008 for a Leo Award in the category of "Best Guest Performance by a Female in a Dramatic Series" for the episode "All Hell Breaks Loose, Part One".

== Home media release ==
The second season of Supernatural was released as a six-disc Region 1 DVD box set in the US on September 11, 2007, two weeks before the premiere of the third season. Including all 22 episodes of the second season, the set also featured DVD extras such as episode commentaries, deleted scenes, bloopers, Jared Padalecki's original screen test, and a featurette on the making of the season finale. The season was ranked No. 13 in DVD sales for its week of release, selling 67,735 sets for $2,573,253. However, it slipped out of the top-30 list the following week. For Region 2, the season was divided into two parts, being released on May 14, 2007, and September 10, 2007; the complete set was released on October 29, 2007. The season was also released in Region 4 on October 3, 2007. The second season was released on Region A Blu-ray Disc on June 14, 2011, including a new special feature–"The Devil's Road Map", an interactive guide featuring interviews about every episode that featured the main cast and directors.
