= Di Bonaventura Pictures =

Film and television production company

Di Bonaventura Pictures, Inc.
- Logo used since 2013
- Type: Private
- Industry: Film production Television shows
- Founded: September 3, 2002; 24 years ago
- Founder: Lorenzo di Bonaventura
- Headquarters: Los Angeles, California, United States
- Divisions: Di Bonaventura Pictures Television

Di Bonaventura Pictures, Inc. (also known as dB Pictures) is an American film and television production company founded in 2002 by Lorenzo di Bonaventura, who is known for producing the Transformers films.

== History ==
On September 3, 2002, Lorenzo di Bonaventura announced that he would leave Warner Bros. to set up his own production company, and that it had a deal with Warner Bros. to produce the feature film Constantine, which was released in 2005.

On December 17, 2002, three months after the company was formed, it signed a 3-year contract with Paramount Pictures to produce feature films.

Di Bonaventura Pictures has remained at Paramount, signing a series of three-year deals, where it has produced the Transformers franchise.

== Di Bonaventura Pictures Television ==
In June 2011, Di Bonaventura, with Dan McDermott, launched a television division, Di Bonaventura Pictures Television, based at ABC Studios under a three-year deal.

When its contract with ABC Studios was not renewed in 2014, it signed a deal with Legendary Television to produce its TV shows.

== Filmography ==
=== Theatrical films ===
==== 2000s ====
Year	Title	Director	Distributor	Notes
2005	Constantine	Francis Lawrence	Warner Bros. Pictures	co-production with Weed Road Pictures, The Donners' Company, Village Roadshow Pictures, Vertigo, Batfilm Productions and 3 Arts Entertainment
2005	Four Brothers	John Singleton	Paramount Pictures	
2005	Doom	Andrzej Bartkowiak	Universal Pictures	co-production with John Wells Productions
2005	Derailed	Mikael Håfström	The Weinstein Company / Buena Vista International	co-production with Miramax Films and Patalex V Productions Limited
2007	Shooter	Antoine Fuqua	Paramount Pictures	
2007	1408	Mikael Håfström	MGM Distribution Co.	co-production with Metro-Goldwyn-Mayer, Dimension Films and The Weinstein Company
2007	Transformers	Michael Bay	Paramount Pictures	co-production with DreamWorks Pictures, Hasbro and Tom DeSanto/Don Murphy Productions
2007	Stardust	Matthew Vaughn	Paramount Pictures	co-production with Ingenious Film Partners and Marv Films
2009	Imagine That	Karey Kirkpatrick	Paramount Pictures	co-production with Nickelodeon Movies
2009	Transformers: Revenge of the Fallen	Michael Bay	Paramount Pictures	co-production with DreamWorks Pictures, Hasbro and Tom DeSanto/Don Murphy Productions
2009	G.I. Joe: The Rise of Cobra	Stephen Sommers	Paramount Pictures	co-production with Hasbro and Spyglass Entertainment

==== 2010s ====
Year	Title	Director	Distributor	Notes
2010	Salt	Phillip Noyce	Sony Pictures Releasing	co-production with Columbia Pictures and Relativity Media
2010	Red	Robert Schwentke	Summit Distribution	co-production with Summit Entertainment and DC Entertainment
2011	Transformers: Dark of the Moon	Michael Bay	Paramount Pictures	co-production with Hasbro and Tom DeSanto/Don Murphy Productions
2012	The Devil Inside	William Brent Bell	Paramount Pictures	uncredited; co-production with Insurge Pictures and Prototype
2012	Man on a Ledge	Asger Leth	Summit Distribution	co-production with Summit Entertainment
2013	The Last Stand	Kim Jee-woon	Lionsgate	
2013	Side Effects	Steven Soderbergh	Open Road Films	co-production with Endgame Entertainment and FilmNation Entertainment
2013	G.I. Joe: Retaliation	Jon M. Chu	Paramount Pictures	co-production with Metro-Goldwyn-Mayer, Skydance Productions and Hasbro
2013	Red 2	Dean Parisot	Lionsgate	co-production with Summit Entertainment and DC Entertainment
2014	Jack Ryan: Shadow Recruit	Kenneth Branagh	Paramount Pictures	co-production with Skydance Productions and Mace Neufeld Productions
2014	Transformers: Age of Extinction	Michael Bay	Paramount Pictures	co-production with Hasbro, Tom DeSanto/Don Murphy Productions and Ian Bryce Productions
2015	Electric Slide	Tristan Patterson	Paragon Pictures	co-production with Killer Films, Media House Capital, Myriad Pictures and Skyscraper Films
2016	Deepwater Horizon	Peter Berg	Lionsgate	co-production with Summit Entertainment, Participant Media, Closest to the Hole Productions and Leverage Entertainment
2017	Transformers: The Last Knight	Michael Bay	Paramount Pictures	co-production with Hasbro, Tom DeSanto/Don Murphy Productions and Ian Bryce Productions
2017	Kidnap	Luis Prieto	Aviron Pictures	co-production with Gold Star Films, 606 Films and Lotus Entertainment, Ingenious Media, Well Go USA, and Rumble Entertainment
2017	Unlocked	Michael Apted	Lionsgate	co-production with SRA Productions, Silver Reel Pictures, Bloom, Sira Productions and Lipsync
2017	American Assassin	Michael Cuesta	Lionsgate	co-production with CBS Films and Industry Entertainment
2017	Only the Brave	Joseph Kosinski	Sony Pictures Releasing (North America, Latin America and Spain); Summit Entertainment (International)	co-production with Columbia Pictures, Black Label Media, Conde Nast Entertainment and Relevant Entertainment
2018	Puppet Master: The Littlest Reich	Sonny Laguna and Tommy Wiklund	RLJE Films	uncredited; co-production with Buffalo 8 Productions, Cinestate, Fangoria, Ghost Horse and Zero Trans Fat Productions
2018	The Meg	Jon Turteltaub	Warner Bros. Pictures	co-production with Gravity Pictures, Flagship Entertainment, Apelles Entertainment and Maeday Productions
2018	Replicas	Jeffrey Nachmanoff	Entertainment Studios Motion Pictures	co-production with Riverstone Pictures, Remstar Studios, Blue Rider Productions, Company Films, Lotus Entertainment, Ocean Park Entertainment, Ingenious Media, Fundamental Films, 74850 and Global Pictures Media, LLC
2018	Bumblebee	Travis Knight	Paramount Pictures	co-production with Allspark Pictures, Tom DeSanto/Don Murphy Productions, Ian Bryce Productions and Bay Films
2019	Pet Sematary	Kevin Kölsch and Dennis Widmyer	Paramount Pictures	co-production with Room 101, Inc

==== 2020s ====
Year	Title	Director	Distributor	Notes
2020	The Secrets We Keep	Yuval Adler	Bleecker Street	co-production with AGC Studios, Fibonacci Films, Image Nation Abu Dhabi and Echo Lake Entertainment
2021	Snake Eyes	Robert Schwentke	Paramount Pictures	co-production with Metro-Goldwyn-Mayer, Skydance Media and Entertainment One
2023	Plane	Jean-François Richet	Lionsgate	co-production with MadRiver Pictures, Olive Hill Media and G-BASE Film
2023	Transformers: Rise of the Beasts	Steven Caple Jr.	Paramount Pictures	co-production with Hasbro, Skydance Media, New Republic Pictures and Bayhem Films
2023	Meg 2: The Trench	Ben Wheatley	Warner Bros. Pictures	co-production with CMC Pictures, DF Pictures and Apelles Entertainment
2024	Madame Web	S. J. Clarkson	Sony Pictures Releasing	co-production with Columbia Pictures and Marvel Entertainment
2024	Transformers One	Josh Cooley	Paramount Pictures	co-production with Paramount Animation, Hasbro Entertainment, New Republic Pictures and Bayhem Films

==== Upcoming ====
Year	Title	Director	Distributor	Notes
2028	Untitled G.I. Joe film	Danny McBride	Paramount Pictures	co-production with Hasbro Entertainment and Rough House Pictures
TBA	G.I. Joe: Ever Vigilant	D. J. Caruso	Paramount Pictures	co-production with Hasbro Entertainment and Skydance Media
TBA	Untitled Transformers film	Ángel Manuel Soto	Paramount Pictures	co-production with Hasbro Entertainment
TBA	The Saint	Doug Liman	Paramount Pictures	
TBA	Houdini	TBA	Paramount Pictures	
TBA	Silencer	TBA	Paramount Pictures	co-production with NeoText Corporation
TBA	Untitled Constantine sequel	Francis Lawrence	Warner Bros. Pictures	co-production with Batfilm Productions, 3 Arts Entertainment, DC Studios, Bad Robot, The Donners' Company and Weed Road Pictures
TBA	Subversion	Patrick Vollrath	Amazon MGM Studios	
TBA	The Gatekeeper	Matthew Michael Carnahan	Amazon MGM Studios	
TBA	London Ghost Tour	Josh Cooley	TBA	co-production with Miramax
TBA	Untitled 1408 sequel	Mikael Håfström	TBA	co-production with Spyglass Media Group, Bluestone Entertainment and FilmNation Entertainment

=== Television ===
==== Released ====
Year(s)	Title	Creator	Network	Notes
2013	Zero Hour	Paul Scheuring	ABC	co-production with ABC Studios, Clickety-Clack and One Light Road Productions
2016–2017	The Real O'Neals	Joshua Sternin; Jennifer Ventimilia developed by: David Winsdor; Casey Johnson	ABC	co-production with ABC Studios and Winsdor & Johnson Productions
2016–2018	Shooter	based on Point of Impact by: Stephen Hunter developed by: John Hlavin	USA Network	co-production with Paramount Television, Leverage Entertainment, Closest to the Hole Productions and Universal Cable Productions
2021	Jupiter's Legacy	Steven S. DeKnight based on Jupiter's Legacy by: Mark Millar and Frank Quitely	Netflix	co-production with Millarworld and DeKnight Productions
2024–present	The New Look	Todd A. Kessler	Apple TV+	credited as DB-AK Pictures; co-production with Apple Studios

==== Upcoming ====
Year(s)	Title	Creator	Network	Notes
TBA	Untitled Lady Jaye spin-off series	based on G.I. Joe by: Hasbro	Amazon Prime Video	co-production with Paramount Television Studios, Skydance Television, and eOne Television

=== Digital/direct-to-video titles ===
Year	Title	Director	Distributor	Notes
2015	Dead Rising: Watchtower	Zach Lipovsky	Crackle	as Di Bonaventura Digital; co-production with Legendary Digital Pictures, Contradiction Films and Capcom Pictures
2016	Dead Rising: Endgame	Pat Williams	Crackle	uncredited; co-production with Legendary Digital Pictures, DR2 Productions and Contradiction Films
2018	Higher Power	Matthew Charles Santoro	Magnet Releasing	co-production with Break Media and Campfire
2019	Doom: Annihilation	Tony Giglio	Universal Pictures Home Entertainment	co-production with Battle Mountain Films and Universal 1440 Entertainment
2021	Infinite	Antoine Fuqua	Paramount+	co-production with Paramount Pictures, Closest to the Hole Productions, New Republic Pictures and Fuqua Films
2023	Pet Sematary: Bloodlines	Lindsey Beer	Paramount+	co-production with Paramount Pictures, Paramount Players and Room 101, Inc.
