= What Is and What Should Never Be (Supernatural) =

- Supernatural episode
- In the new reality in which Mary Winchester never died, Sam and Dean were never exposed to the supernatural world. Real photographs of Padalecki and Ackles as children were edited together to depict their normal childhood.
- Episode no.: Season 2 Episode 20
- Directed by: Eric Kripke
- Written by: Raelle Tucker
- Cinematography by: Serge Ladouceur
- Editing by: Anthony Pinker
- Production code: 3T5520
- Original air date: May 3, 2007

Guest appearances
- Samantha Smith as Mary Winchester; Adrianne Palicki as Jessica Moore; Michelle Borth as Carmen; Mackenzie Gray as Djinn; Melanie Scrofano as Near-Dead Girl; Kwesi Ameyaw as College Professor

Episode chronology
← Previous "Folsom Prison Blues"	Next → "All Hell Breaks Loose"
- Supernatural season 2

"What Is and What Should Never Be" is the twentieth episode of the television series Supernatural's second season. It was first broadcast on May 3, 2007 on The CW. The narrative follows series protagonist Dean Winchester (Jensen Ackles) who finds himself in an alternate reality after a confrontation with a djinn [sic]. (Note: Properly speaking, djinn is a plural word. The correct singular is djinni.) The creature appears to have fulfilled Dean's greatest wish: that his mother had not been killed when he was a child. Dean is happy in the new world until it becomes apparent that his previous work as a hunter of supernatural creatures has been undone. At this point, he rejects the alternate reality, and attempts to find a method to bring himself back.

The episode was written by executive story editor Raelle Tucker, and marked the directorial debut of series creator Eric Kripke. It featured the return of deceased characters Mary Winchester (Samantha Smith) and Jessica Moore (Adrianne Palicki). Kripke enjoyed expanding upon the character of Mary, who was only briefly depicted in earlier episodes. The production schedule had to be altered to accommodate Palicki, who was simultaneously working on the TV series Friday Night Lights.

Despite obtaining low ratings, the episode acquired positive critical reviews that both praised Ackles' performance and welcomed the return of Smith and Palicki to the series. Tucker also received a Constellation Award for her work on the episode.

== Plot ==
The episode begins in an abandoned warehouse, where Dean (Ackles) is attacked by the djinn that he is hunting. He suddenly finds himself in a world in which his mother (Smith) was not killed by the demon Azazel. He and his brother Sam (Jared Padalecki) were not raised to be hunters of supernatural creatures, but are no longer close, as Dean is irresponsible, disloyal, and drinks too much in this alternate reality; when a confused Dean calls him for help, Sam thinks that he is drunk. In the new reality, Dean is dating the beautiful Carmen Porter (Michelle Borth), and Sam is at law school and engaged to Jessica (Palicki)—another victim of Azazel. Although Dean enjoys his new life, a ghostly young woman seems to be haunting him and he is confronted by an image of corpses in his closet. He realizes that all the people that he and Sam had saved as hunters are now dead, that he and Sam have a distant and somewhat adversarial relationship. After visiting the grave of his father John, who died the previous year of a stroke, Dean decides that he must give up his new-found happiness to save them.

In need of something silver—an inherent weakness of the djinn—Dean breaks into their mother's house to steal a sterling silver knife. However, he is caught by Sam, who believes Dean is stealing from their mother. Initially, Dean pretends to need the knife to settle a gambling debt, but eventually, he admits the truth. Although Sam is skeptical, he agrees to accompany his brother to the djinn's warehouse lair. There Dean discovers that the young woman he has been having visions of is a victim of the djinn. She is alive but in an hallucinatory state—a way for the djinn to keep its victims unresisting while it feeds—Dean realizes that he, too, is within an illusory world. Knowing that a person wakes up if he or she dies in a dream, he decides to kill himself. Carmen, Jessica, and his mother appear and try to talk him out of it. Dean resists the urge to stay, and awakens in the real world after stabbing himself. Sam, who is already in the warehouse trying to rescue him, is attacked by the djinn, but Dean kills the creature.

== Production ==
=== Writing ===
I’m a fan of Buffy and one of the episodes I really remember was the one where she woke up in mental institution and you don’t know quite what was reality and what was her old life and what was her new life. I thought that was really interesting, the idea of rebooting Supernatural and placing all of these characters in a completely different world...

— Kripke on finding inspiration in the Buffy the Vampire Slayer episode "Normal Again"

Series creator Eric Kripke's first experience as director was slated for the twentieth episode of the season, and Raelle Tucker was scheduled to pen it. Kripke wanted a script that was as "director-proof as possible", but that would "play with structure and really do something different". He shot down every idea the writers pitched to him until Tucker suggested an alternate reality episode. Drawing inspiration from the Buffy the Vampire Slayer episode "Normal Again", Kripke was excited by the concept. He felt Dean's definitive moment was the death of his mother Mary, so the "diversion path" of the new reality would be based on the question, "What if mom never died?" This change allows Sam and Dean to live normal lives, though at the cost of their relationship. The point of the false reality, in Kripke's opinion, was to show that the brothers would not be close if they had not become hunters. The staff tried to persuade him to remove this aspect, but he thought it would be "lame" for Sam and Dean to have a "7th Heaven relationship". Once the story was fully developed, Tucker was given free rein over the script; this surprised her because she expected Kripke to "be more of a backseat driver than he was".

The opportunity to bring back the character of Mary Winchester excited Kripke. Though she is a driving force behind the brothers' quest to kill the demon Azazel and is referenced numerous times throughout the first two seasons, her two appearances in the series were very brief. The episode allowed the character to be expanded upon, depicting her as a "really perfect and idyllic mother". However, Kripke felt that Dean would realize something was amiss if he was granted a "perfect dream world", so John Winchester, who died in the second season premiere, remained dead.

The final version of the episode differed from the original concept. It was initially intended for Dean to be a "huge loser" in his new life; being a hunter is what gives him structure and purpose. Without hunting, he would be a jobless barfly. Kripke compared the new reality to a Charles Bukowski novel, but noted that the selfless Dean still preferred the new universe, with Sam happy and living a good life. However, executive producer Robert Singer and others convinced him to change this, because they did not think Dean would be happy suddenly waking up in such a reality. Another variation stemmed from Dean's lack of someone to confide in—normally Sam is his confidant. Because the writers found it difficult to communicate Dean's feelings, early drafts of the script included a number of internal monologues. These were ultimately replaced by a scene in which he discusses the djinn with a professor. The studio wanted the scene of Dean and his girlfriend Carmen kissing on the sofa to include sex. However, Kripke could not work it into the script, because he found it unrealistic that she would deliberately be late for her job as a hospital nurse.

=== Djinn ===
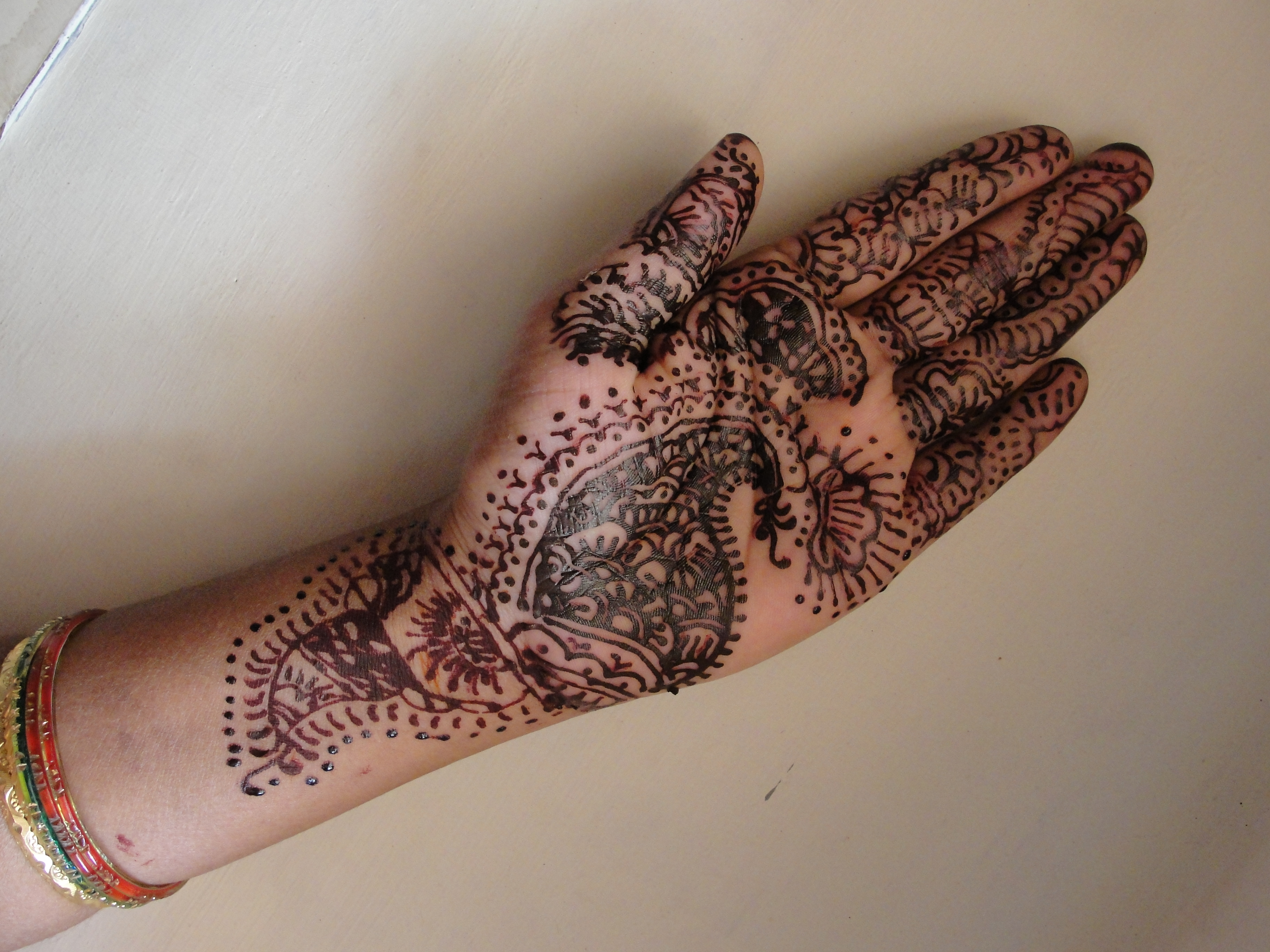
Henna tattoos (left) inspired the djinn's appearance in the episode (right).

The writers wanted to use a wish to create the new reality, and chose a genie to facilitate it. The Islamic djinn—the origins of genie folklore—became the episode's monster, but featured the "bastardized western conception" of wish-granting to fit the episode. To avoid the typical portrayal of genies in popular culture—such as those from Aladdin and I Dream of Jeannie—they chose to create a "logical twist on the lore" by making the creature vampiric. Tucker originally intended for the creature's feeding method to be mystical—it would inhale its victim's life essence from his or her mouth. However, Kripke preferred to style it more like a horror movie, and had the djinn feed from a shunt in its victim's neck.

The creature's appearance was inspired by an image of a woman with a henna-tattooed back that Kripke found on the internet. He thought it would be intriguing to have the villain's entire body tattooed. The actor who portrayed the djinn—Mackenzie Gray—had a shaved head, so special effects makeup artist Toby Lindala only used a minor prosthetic to cover Gray's eyebrows. Lindala found the tattoos to be a "particular challenge" because they were "intricate designs". The production schedule could not accommodate the six hours needed to apply the makeup each day, so the actor was booked with the condition that the make-up not be removed for four days. Gray's personal life was affected by this, as people on the street were scared by his appearance. Lindala was surprised that Gray was able to keep the tattoos undamaged outside of filming.

=== Filming ===
Principal photography for the episode took place in Vancouver, British Columbia. Kripke wanted Adrianne Palicki to reprise her role of Jessica Moore—Sam's deceased girlfriend—but she was busy filming for the Texas-based television series Friday Night Lights. Because Jessica was an integral aspect of the storyline, the production schedule was adjusted to accommodate the actress. The first five days of filming commenced for "What Is and What Should Never Be", and production then shifted to "All Hell Breaks Loose, Part One" until Palicki became available for the final three days of filming. However, she was not present for filming of the episode's climax. Instead, the actress filmed her part in front of a blue screen, and was later digitally added into the scene.

Because the series usually has a dark atmosphere, often consisting of "sets with grime and a sense of danger", Kripke wanted there to be a contrast between the two worlds. Therefore, he requested that production designer Jerry Wanek build the "most beautiful, warm, affectionate sets you’ve ever seen". Cinematographer Serge Ladouceur also made the usual shadows and "moody lighting" more colorful and warm. Though it rained almost constantly through filming, perfect weather arose for filming of one of the main contrasting scenes—Dean mowing the lawn. Kripke wanted it to appear "too perfect to be real", and was able to film the "sunny, beautiful scene". The "creepy" warehouse used as a lair by the djinn was a redesigned warehouse set from the television series Kyle XY.

I had this random idea in my head that Dean going off on a hunt and wanting or not wanting Sam to go with him and Sam coming anyway was very reflective of that first scene where they ran into each other in the pilot, and they got into that first fight. I got obsessed with recreating that...

— Kripke on his inspiration to include homages to the pilot

One of the first directors Kripke had become acquainted with and learned from was David Nutter. Kripke thus wanted to include homages to Nutter's work on the pilot; some scenes of the new reality were meant to be recreations from the first episode. The crew attempted to match the camera angles, lighting, and music as much as possible. While Sam and Jessica sleeping together in bed was supposed to be an exact replica of a similar scene, the fight between the brothers differed. Because the new Sam is "pretty much a wussy", Dean is able to take him down instantly. Tucker noted that it was also a "sneaky way" of hinting that the new reality was merely an illusion, as he is "re-experiencing that moment from the pilot because his fantasy world is being generated by what he already knows and has lived".

Many of the photos present throughout the Winchester home were photoshopped by graphic artist Mary-Ann Liu. Each one was discussed and refined, as Kripke felt they were important to show the new Winchester family history. Some pictures, such as Dean at the prom and Sam at graduation, were edited versions of photos from Ackles' and Padalecki's childhood.

=== Music ===
The episode's synthesized orchestral score was written by Christopher Lennertz. As of production of the fourth season, the episode has been his favorite one to score. Lennertz used a solo bassoon for the emotional scenes in the alternate reality rather than the cello he normally uses for Sam and Dean's relationship. He noted that it "set a very interesting lead tone for the episode". Following the series' tradition, the episode also featured rock songs.

== Reception ==
This episode touched on the heart of Supernatural: brotherly love, sense of duty, saving the lives of people who don't know what's truly out there. So yes, this episode was heartbreaking, but it was a little uplifting as well.

— Charles on "What Is and What Should Never Be"

In its original broadcast, "What Is and What Should Never Be" was viewed by an estimated 3.11 million viewers, one of the lowest ratings for the season. Conversely, writer Raelle Tucker won the Constellation Award for "Best Overall 2007 Science Fiction Film or Television Script" for her work on the episode, and the episode garnered positive reviews from critics. Tina Charles of TV Guide "adored" the episode, and considered it to be Jensen Ackles' best performance of the series. She experienced an "emotional roller coaster the entire hour", finding Dean's monologue at his father's grave to be "crushing" but the lawnmower scene to be "hilarious". Likewise, Diana Steenbergen of IGN gave the episode a rating of 9.2 out of 10, praising the quick pace, "heavy" character development, and "ton and a half of angst". She, too, felt that Ackles "hits the ball out of the park", and noted that the episode's humor stemmed from Ackles' willingness to be a "big goofball". Actresses Samantha Smith and Adrianne Palicki were "a treat", although Steenbergen would have liked Jeffrey Dean Morgan to return.

Tom Burns of UGO deemed the episode as "one of the strongest hours of Supernatural all season", feeling that "the actors really stepped up their game...and sold every moment". He also noted the "unapologetically emotional" Ackles, who "[wore] his joy, sadness, and anxiety all over this face, but always [kept] things real and in character". Though Burns believed that "wish-world" stories have been overused in fiction, he felt that Ackles' "hardcore acting chops" allowed the episode to "escape from mediocrity". The "outstanding" and "well crafted" episode was given a 7 out of 7 by TV Squad's Brett Love. He considered the djinn as "one of the better representations" of genies in popular culture, and noted that the creature had the "perfect creepy look to it". He was pleased to see Smith and Palicki return, and found the character of Carmen to be "a nice addition to the family". Don Williams of BuddyTV agreed, and ranked the episode third in his list of the best episodes of the first three seasons. Deeming it the best standalone episode, he noted that it "can be embraced by anyone who enjoys clever writing, great acting, or a shirtless Jensen Ackles".
