= What Is and What Should Never Be (disambiguation) =

"What Is and What Should Never Be" is a 1969 song by Led Zeppelin.

What Is and What Should Never Be may also refer to:

- "What Is and What Should Never Be" (One Tree Hill), a 2004 episode of One Tree Hill
- "What Is and What Should Never Be" (Supernatural), a 2007 episode of Supernatural
