= Dead Rising: Endgame =

2016 American action zombie film by Pat Williams

- Directed by: Pat Williams
- Written by: Tim Carter; Michael Ferris
- Based on: Dead Rising by Capcom
- Produced by: Tim Carter; Chris Foss
- Starring: Jesse Metcalfe; Keegan Connor Tracy; Dennis Haysbert; Marie Avgeropoulos; Jessica Harmon; Camille Sullivan; Victor Webster
- Cinematography: David Pelletier
- Edited by: Justin Li
- Music by: Rich Walters
- Production companies: Legendary Digital Media; Contradiction Films; Dead Rising Productions
- Distributed by: Crackle
- Release date: June 20, 2016
- Running time: 96 minutes
- Country: United States
- Language: English

Dead Rising: Endgame is a 2016 American action horror zombie film directed by Pat Williams and written by Tim Carter and Michael Ferris. The film stars Jesse Metcalfe, Keegan Connor Tracy, Dennis Haysbert, Marie Avgeropoulos, Jessica Harmon, Camille Sullivan and Victor Webster. It is a sequel to the 2015 film Dead Rising: Watchtower. It was released on Crackle on June 20, 2016.

== Plot ==
Set between the events of Dead Rising 2 and 3, the story continues where Watchtower left off. Chase catches Lyons' crimes on camera; however, his boss refused to broadcast it due to fear the military will come and kill them. Lyons sends his agents to kill Chase; however, Chase escapes. Garth is a skilled zombie killer and video game aficionado who talks a big and crude game to mask his gentle side.

Rand is a handsome, cruel scientist who was hired by the government to find a cure for the raging zombie infection but instead is conducting horrendous experiments on the infected making the zombies faster and stronger. Sandra Lowe is a skilled computer hacker and Chase’s on-and-off girlfriend who joins him in his quest to battle the zombie-infested underground and stop General Lyons’ plan. George Hancock is the courageous whistleblower who compels Chase and his team to enter a zombie-infested city on a rescue mission. Jill is a news producer who joins Chase and his intrepid crew to infiltrate a secret laboratory and stop the carnage.

Susan Ingot is the CEO of Phenotrans, the manufacturer of Zombrex, the vaccine that keeps the zombie infection at bay. It's revealed that Lyons and Phenotrans were behind the last outbreak at East Mission. Susan fears the military is planning to kill all the infected people and secretly plans a new zombie virus to stay in business. Chase and the others discover that Jordan is alive. Garth gets bitten by a fast zombie, which Zombrex cannot cure. George Hancock steals a new Zombie drug from Dr. Rand.

Chase and his allies stop the military's plan, causing General Lyons to flee. George Hancock escapes underground, but is shot by Lyons's agents. The new drug that George stole is now lost in the underground.

== Cast ==
- Jesse Metcalfe as Chase Carter
- Keegan Connor Tracy as Jordan Blair
- Dennis Haysbert as General Lyons
- Marie Avgeropoulos as Sandra Lowe
- Jessica Harmon as Jill Ekland
- Camille Sullivan as Susan "Sue" Ingot
- Victor Webster as Chuck Greene
- Patrick Sabongui as Garth O'Toole
- Billy Zane as Dr. Leon Rand
- Ian Tracey as George Hancock

== Production ==
A sequel to Dead Rising: Watchtower, Dead Rising: Endgame, was announced for Spring 2016 on Crackle with Jesse Metcalfe, Keegan Connor Tracy, and Dennis Haysbert reprising their roles from the first film and Sabongui returning in a new role. New to the cast are Billy Zane as Rand, Marie Avgeropoulos as Sandra Lowe, Ian Tracey as George Hancock, Jessica Harmon as Jill, Victor Webster as Dead Rising 2 hero Chuck Greene and Camille Sullivan as Susan Ingot.

== Reception ==
IGN awarded it a score of 6.7 out of 10, saying "Endgame strays further from its source material than the previous film, but it's also superior in terms of quality."

== Accolades ==
Year	Award	Category	Recipient(s)	Result	Ref(s)
2017	Leo Award	Best Make-Up in a Television Movie	Cindy Barlow, Nikita Pennock, Ryan Nicholson, Megan Nicholson, Roy Nicholson, Michelle Grady	Won	
2017	Leo Award	Best Picture Editing in a Television Movie	Jamie Alain, Justin Li	Won	
2017	Leo Award	Best Television Movie	Tim Carter, Tomas Harlan	Nominated	
2017	Leo Award	Best Direction in a Television Movie	Pat Williams	Nominated	
