= Dead Rising: Watchtower =

2015 American action zombie film by Zach Lipovsky

- Release poster
- Directed by: Zach Lipovsky
- Written by: Tim Carter
- Based on: Dead Rising by Capcom
- Produced by: Tim Carter; Tomas Harlan
- Starring: Jesse Metcalfe; Meghan Ory; Virginia Madsen; Keegan Connor Tracy; Rob Riggle; Dennis Haysbert
- Cinematography: Mahlon Todd Williams
- Edited by: Mike Jackson
- Music by: Oleksa Lozowchuk
- Production companies: Legendary Digital Media; Contradiction Films; Di Bonaventura Digital; Capcom Pictures; Dead Rising Productions
- Distributed by: Crackle
- Release date: March 27, 2015
- Running time: 118 minutes
- Country: United States
- Language: English

Dead Rising: Watchtower is a 2015 American action zombie film directed by Zach Lipovsky, produced by Tomas Harlan and Tim Carter, and written by Tim Carter. The film stars Jesse Metcalfe, Dennis Haysbert, Virginia Madsen, Meghan Ory, Keegan Connor Tracy, and Rob Riggle. It is based on the video game of the same name. Principal photography began on September 30, 2014, in Vancouver, British Columbia, Canada. Legendary Pictures produced the picture as its first digital film through its Legendary Digital Media division and it was released on Crackle on March 27, 2015.

== Plot ==
Set between the events of the second and third game, Chase Carter and his camerawoman Jordan Blaire cover the zombie outbreak in East Mission, Oregon. With the city mostly evacuated, the government — running an organization called FEZA; Federal Emergency Zombie Agency — set up another zone wherein infected are administered the antiviral drug, Zombrex, to prevent their transformation. However, at the center, the Zombrex doesn't take effect which causes numerous people to turn. In the chaos, Jordan manages to escape the city, while Chase is left behind.

Chase manages to survive the initial onslaught along with Crystal O'Rourke — an experienced loner who was infected in a previous outbreak, and hasn't taken the government administered Zombrex; and Maggie, a grieving mother whose daughter was infected and subsequently killed, which in turn left Maggie in a state of delusion and denial. When Maggie explains that her daughter took the Zombrex, while Crystal carries her own, Chase theorizes this is a new strain that's resistant. Chase reaches out to Susan Collier, a news anchor outside the city, who is covering the outbreak along with Frank West, explaining his theory. In the meantime, Jordan reaches a military safe zone, overseen by General Lyons and Dr. Norton.

Taking refuge in a pawn shop, Chase, Crystal and Maggie come across a group of anarchist bikers led by Logan. who had infiltrated the city to reign over the chaos. Jordon contacts Chase from outside and learns the government intends to firebomb the city. Chase goes on the air to deny the government's cover story. Witnessing Crystal administering her personal Zombrex needle, Chase realizes that the infection isn't resistant, while Jordon investigates the safe zone. Jordan tells Lyons about Chase's theory and is secretly given the location of a warehouse where the government's Zombrex is kept. Giving the location to Chase's group, they have Crystal test the government's Zombrex against Crystal's supply, proving the government's batch to be defective.

Chase broadcasts Crystal's test, and the public outrage forces Lyons to postpone the firebombing. However, the warehouse is shown to be the hideout of Logan's gang, who have captured numerous zombies. Believing her daughter to be among them, Maggie willingly lets herself be bitten while embracing her. Logan captures Crystal and reveals his intent to bomb the city's walls and spread the outbreak further. In the ensuing fight, Logan's men are killed, while Logan himself is bitten and infected by a zombie. Meanwhile, Lyons addresses a press conference, where he accuses Nortan of handing out defective Zombrex. Afterwards, Lyons tells Jordan that he sent an evacuation team to rescue Chase, but found no survivors; however, Jordan realizes Lyons' deception when Chase calls immediately afterwards.

Lyons announces to the press the government's plan to place a Zombrex chip in the infected that will keep them inculcated, but must be administered yearly. Before he leaves, Norton warns Jordan that those chips will allow the government to track the infected. Jordan notices a military truck from the day before was carrying those chips, and that the government orchestrated the outbreak as a pretense to use them. Crystal and Chase reach the city wall, pursued by zombies and a transforming Logan, who intends to bomb the wall. Chase and Crystal kill Logan, and are taken into the safezone where Crystal is implanted with the chip. Meanwhile, Norton is killed as part of the cover up, and Jordan is captured, but not before leaving her phone for Chase to find. While the city is firebombed, Chase and Crystal uncover the government's true plans.

== Cast ==
- Jesse Metcalfe as Chase Carter
- Meghan Ory as Crystal O'Rourke
- Virginia Madsen as Maggie
- Keegan Connor Tracy as Jordan Blair
- Aleks Paunovic as Logan
- Dennis Haysbert as General Lyons
- Gary Jones as Norton
- Carrie Genzel as Susan Collier
- Rob Riggle as Frank West. A photographer and former survivor of the Willamette Mall Outbreak. The character had previously appeared within the games: Frank is the main protagonist of Dead Rising, Dead Rising 4, Dead Rising 2: Case West, and Dead Rising 2: Off the Record.
- Reese Alexander as Shearson
- Harley Morenstein as Pyro
- Julia Benson as Amy
- Peter Benson as Bruce
- C. Ernst Harth as Bonzo Zombie
- Jen and Sylvia Soska as Zombies (cameo; uncredited)
- Ryan Connolly as Zombie (for Film Riot episode; uncredited)
- Patrick Sabongui as Hippie Zombrex Doctor

== Production ==
=== Development ===
On June 19, 2014, it was announced that Legendary Pictures' Legendary Digital Media would develop its first digital feature film based on the video game Dead Rising, Lorenzo di Bonaventura would executive produce, Tim Carter would write and produce with Tomas Harlan through their Contradiction Films. The film is not a part of Legendary's 5-year deal with Universal Pictures. Instead, Crackle would handle domestic rights of the film and which would be distributed internationally by Content Media Corp, and it would also be released on SVOD, DVD, VOD and TV after its exclusive stream on Crackle. On August 20, visual effects artist Zach Lipovsky was set to direct the film.

On September 29, the official title was confirmed as Dead Rising: Watchtower and the cast announced including Jesse Metcalfe, Dennis Haysbert, Virginia Madsen and Meghan Ory. More cast joined on October 20, including Rob Riggle, Harley Morenstein, Keegan Connor Tracy and Aleks Paunovic. Riggle would play Frank West, a photojournalist who knows how to survive zombie attacks, Genzel plays Susan, the anchorwoman who interviews Frank West, Paunovic would play Logan, the head of a biker gang, Morenstein would play his second-in-command, Pyro, while Tracy would play the role of a straight-laced journalist.

=== Filming ===
The principal photography on the film began in Vancouver, British Columbia, on September 30, 2014. On October 21, a photo from the set was revealed by Crackle.

== Release ==
The film premiered on Crackle on March 27, 2015.

== Critical reception ==
Neil Genzlinger of The New York Times wrote that the film may be rewarding for fans of the video game but is otherwise "a time waster devoid of the wit and depth of other walking-dead fare currently available". Pat Torfe of Bloody Disgusting wrote that the film adheres too closely to the video game for non-fans to enjoy. Gareth Jones of Dread Central rated it 3.5/5 stars and called it respectful enough of the genre to draw in non-fans. Jones and Torfe both praised Riggle's acting, but Genzlinger said that it should have been funnier than it was.

== Sequel ==
Dead Rising: Endgame, a sequel was announced for Spring 2016 on Crackle with Jesse Metcalfe, Keegan Connor Tracy and Dennis Haysbert reprising their roles from the first film and Sabongui returning in a new role as a skilled zombie killer and video game aficionado who talks a big and crude game to mask his gentle side. New to the cast are Billy Zane as Rand, a handsome, cruel scientist who was hired by the government to find a cure for the raging zombie infection but instead is conducting horrendous experiments on the infected, Marie Avgeropoulos as Sandra Lowe, a skilled computer hacker and Chase’s on-and-off girlfriend who joins him in his quest to battle the zombie-infested underground and stop General Lyons’ plan, Ian Tracey as George Hancock, the courageous whistleblower who compels Chase and his team to enter a zombie-infested city on a rescue mission, Jessica Harmon as Jill, a news producer who joins Chase and his intrepid crew to infiltrate a secret laboratory and stop the carnage, Victor Webster as Dead Rising 2 hero Chuck Greene and Camille Sullivan as Susan Ingot, the CEO of Phenotrans, the manufacturer of Zombrex, the vaccine that keeps the zombie infection at bay.
