= Contradiction Films =

American film and television production company

- Industry: Film/television production, commercial video production
- Key people: Tomas Harlan

Contradiction Films is a film and television production company with offices in Los Angeles and Austin, which specializes in live-action adaptations of video games and is best known for its Mortal Kombat: Legacy.

The company also produces corporate and commercial videos within both the public and private sectors.

== Films ==
Year	Title	Director	Studio
2011	The Chateau Meroux	Bob Fugger	Starz
2011	Mortal Kombat: Legacy	Kevin Tancharoen	Warner Brothers
2015	Dead Rising: Watchtower	Zach Lipovsky	Legendary Pictures/Sony
2015	Electra Woman and Dyna Girl	Chris Marrs	Legendary Pictures/Fullscreen
2016	Dead Rising: Endgame	Pat Williams	Legendary Pictures/Sony
