= Pilot (Supernatural) =

Pilot episode of Supernatural

- Supernatural episode
- Mary Winchester was killed in the episode's teaser. A papier-mâché replica of the actress was ignited on a fake ceiling to accomplish the effect.
- Episode no.: Season 1 Episode 1
- Directed by: David Nutter
- Written by: Eric Kripke
- Cinematography by: Aaron Schneider
- Editing by: Paul Karasick
- Production code: 475285
- Original air date: September 13, 2005
- Running time: 46 minutes

Guest appearances
- Sarah Shahi as Constance Welch; Jeffrey Dean Morgan as John Winchester; Adrianne Palicki as Jessica Moore; Samantha Smith as Mary Winchester; Steve Railsback as Joseph Welch; Ross Kohn as Troy Squire; R. D. Call as Sheriff Pierce

Episode chronology
← Previous —	Next → "Wendigo"
- Supernatural season 1

"Pilot" is the first episode of the television series Supernatural. It premiered on The WB on September 13, 2005, and was written by series creator Eric Kripke and directed by executive producer David Nutter. The Supernatural pilot introduced the characters of Sam (Jared Padalecki) and Dean Winchester (Jensen Ackles), brothers who travel throughout the country hunting supernatural creatures, as they battled a ghostly Woman in White (Sarah Shahi) while searching for their missing father (Jeffrey Dean Morgan).

Kripke was developing the concept for ten years before it was greenlit as a television series. Before it could be filmed, the script underwent numerous revisions. The episode was produced in Los Angeles, though future episodes were filmed in Vancouver, British Columbia, to save money. The episode established the series' tradition of a rock-music soundtrack and included background music scored by Kripke's friend Christopher Lennertz. It received mixed reviews, with critics praising the horror elements but having varying opinions of the lead actors' performances.

== Plot ==
In 1983, Lawrence, Kansas, Mary Winchester (Samantha Smith) investigates a sound coming from her infant son Sam's nursery. She sees a figure standing over his crib, and then she goes downstairs and sees her husband sleeping on the sofa, realizing that the person upstairs is an intruder, she goes to confront him. Her husband, John (Jeffrey Dean Morgan), is awoken by her screams and finds her pinned to the ceiling with a slash across her stomach. She bursts into flames, and John is forced to evacuate the house with Sam and his older son, Dean, while the house erupts into flames.

Twenty-two years later, a 22-year-old Sam (Jared Padalecki) and his girlfriend Jessica Moore (Adrianne Palicki) celebrate his high LSAT score and upcoming law school interview. Later that night, Dean (Jensen Ackles) shows up at Sam's home. Though the brothers have not spoken in years, Dean comes looking for help in finding their father, who disappeared while hunting a supernatural entity. After Sam hears a voicemail from his father that contains electronic voice phenomenon of a woman saying, "I can never go home," he agrees to help Dean in the search. The brothers head to John's last known whereabouts—the town of Jericho—where he had been investigating the disappearances of young men along a single stretch of road over ten years. Sam and Dean discover a local legend of a murdered girl who has returned as a homicidal, hitchhiking ghost. Research points to Constance Welch (Shahi), who jumped to her death off a nearby bridge after drowning her children. While they stakeout the bridge that night, Sam tells Dean he does not want to return to hunting supernatural creatures. He points out that finding whatever creature killed their mother—a task their father has dedicated his life to—will not bring her back. The two are interrupted by a ghostly woman jumping off the bridge. Sam and Dean later check into a local motel, and discover their father is also renting a room there. They break into it and discover his research scattered all over the room; all his findings point to Constance being a woman in white, as the victims were unfaithful to their loved ones.

When Dean leaves the room to get food, he is arrested by the police, who believe he is connected to the disappearances. At the police station, they show him John's journal, and he notices the message "Dean 35-111" written inside it. As Dean is interrogated, Sam tracks down Constance's husband Joseph (Steve Railsback), and learns the locations of both her grave site and the house in which she drowned their children after Joseph's infidelity. Sam then fakes a 911 call so Dean can escape the station. However, Constance targets Sam in the Impala, demanding he take her home. Sam refuses, but she possesses the car so that it drives Sam to her home. Once they arrive at her old house, she attempts to seduce him, but when he resists, she attacks him. Dean forces her to temporarily dissipate by shooting her with rock salt, and Sam uses the opportunity to crash the car into the house. Constance reappears and attacks them, but the spirits of her children confront her. They embrace their mother, causing her to scream in pain as demonic like beings spawn from under her, dragging her down through the floor. It is revealed that the reason she could ‘never go home’ was because she was too afraid to confront her children.

Dean deduces John's message was coordinates to where he has headed. Sam still does not want to join the search, so Dean drops him off at his apartment. Lying alone in bed, Sam discovers Jessica pinned to the ceiling with a slash across her stomach. She ignites into flames as Dean breaks in and rescues Sam. While firefighters attempt to put out the inferno, Sam decides to join his brother in the search for their father and the creature that killed their mother and Jessica.

== Production ==
=== Development ===
Series creator Eric Kripke had previously written for the WB series Tarzan, and was offered the chance to pitch show ideas to the network. He used the opportunity for Supernatural, a concept he had been developing for nearly ten years. Kripke envisioned Supernatural as a road trip series, deeming it the "best vehicle to tell these stories because it's pure, stripped down and uniquely American... These stories exist in these small towns all across the country, and it just makes so much sense to drive in and out of these stories." Though the network rejected his initial pitch—a tabloid reporter investigates supernatural occurrences throughout the country—they were still interested in a series featuring urban legends. Kripke quickly suggested a Route 66-style series, and the network loved it. Filming was greenlit after director David Nutter, who previously had worked with Kripke on Tarzan, signed on.

=== Cast and characters ===
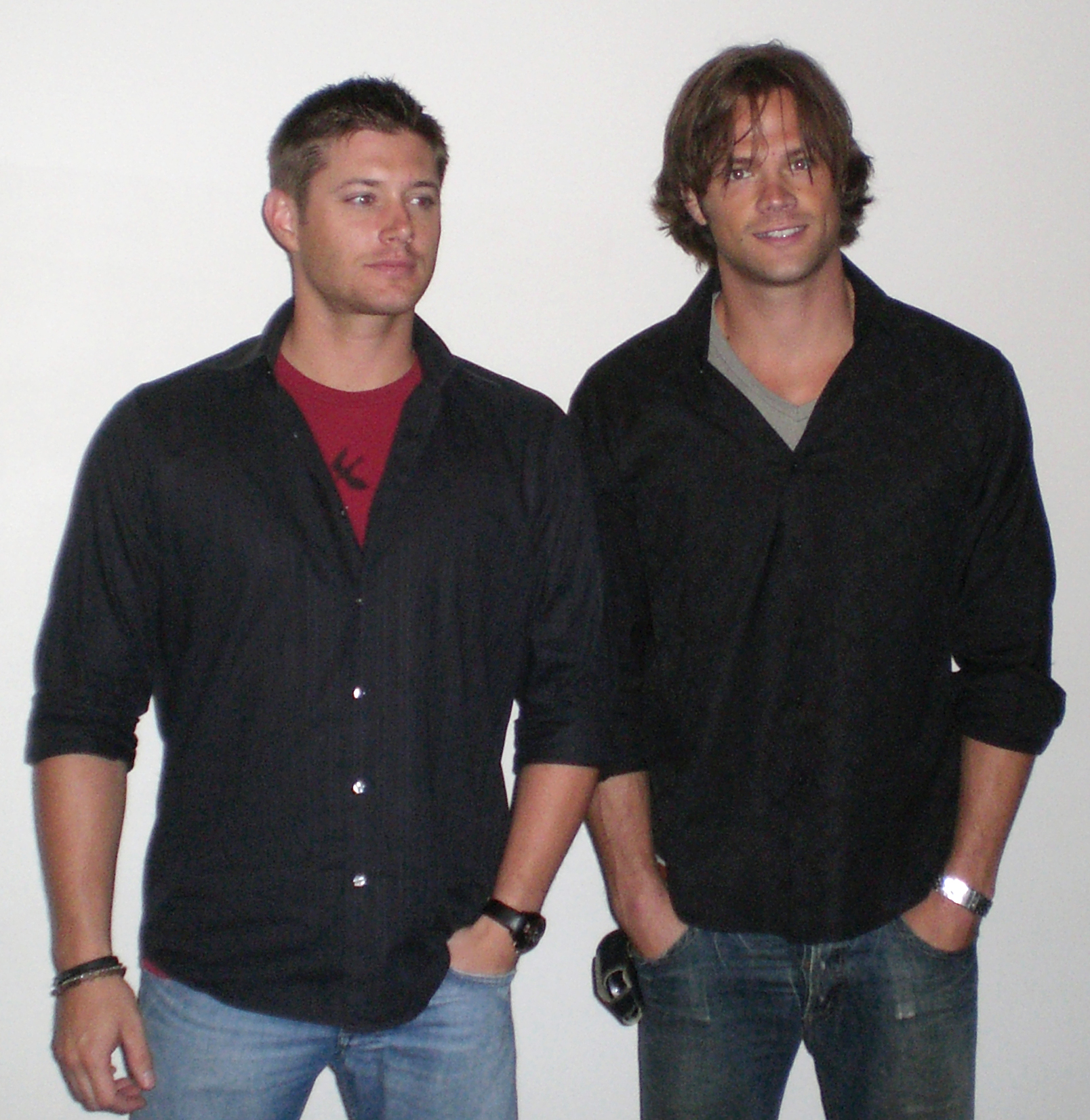
Ackles (left) and Padalecki (right) were the only actors to audition for the lead roles of Dean and Sam Winchester.

The pilot stars Jared Padalecki and Jensen Ackles as Sam and Dean Winchester, whom Kripke likened to Luke Skywalker and Han Solo of Star Wars. Padalecki knew executive producers McG and Nutter, the former convincing him to audition for the role. He was excited to play "the reluctant hero", and compared Sam to The Matrix's Neo. However, Nutter also asked Ackles to audition for the role of Sam. Nutter and Kripke found themselves in a predicament, as they felt both actors were great as Sam. To remedy the situation, Warner Bros. president Peter Roth suggested Ackles instead audition for Dean. Kripke agreed, believing Ackles' "smart-ass attitude" made him "born to play" the Harrison Ford-like character, and Ackles preferred the character of Dean after reading the script. Both actors were the only ones to audition, and network executives instantly noticed a brotherly chemistry between them. Evil Dead-actor Bruce Campbell was Kripke's first choice to portray John Winchester, father of Sam and Dean. However, Campbell was unavailable, and Jeffrey Dean Morgan eventually received the role. With Morgan's scene taking place 22 years before the series, he expected to be replaced by an older actor for subsequent episodes, and was surprised when he was later asked to reprise the role.

For the role of Constance Welch—the Woman in White—production set out to find the "perfect actress". Nutter, a fan of The L Word, had watched an episode featuring actress Sarah Shahi one night during the casting process. He felt she was "really sharp" and a "fine actress", with a "seductive quality about her". Surprised when she came in to audition the following day, he knew she "had the job when she walked in the door". Because the scene involving Constance's husband Joseph Welch merely discusses Constance's backstory, the scene hinged on the actors' performances. Seeking a "great actor", Nutter recalled his previous experience working with Steve Railsback, and offered him the role. Other guest stars include Adrianne Palicki as Sam's girlfriend Jessica Moore, and Samantha Smith as Mary Winchester. The latter felt she landed the part due to her joking around with Nutter during the audition.

=== Writing ===
The episode was written by series creator Eric Kripke, who described its creation as a "very difficult, birthing process" due to the numerous rewrites required. The original version did not feature the Woman in White, and John Winchester died in the teaser. In the revised script, Sam and Dean Winchester were raised by their aunt and uncle instead of their father. Because of this, Sam is unaware that supernatural beings exist, and Dean must convince him of the truth when he asks for help. Kripke realized this made the backstory too complicated, and reworked it with co-executive producer Peter Johnson so that their father raised them to be hunters like him. This decision granted the brothers proficiency in both fighting and swindling people. Other revised concepts included Sam believing Dean to be a serial killer who murdered their father, and John dying instead of Sam's girlfriend Jessica. The scene in which the brothers discuss their childhood and delve into their backstory was rewritten 20 to 30 times, and the final version was heavily trimmed.

A gas-station scene within the episode was meant to establish what the brothers and the series are about—bantering, credit card scams, and classic rock; Kripke feared that it would be cut because it was character-based and did not further the episode's plot. He also did not want the series to feature ballad music typical of The WB network, and forced the use of classic rock for the soundtrack by writing the music into the script. For the episode's villain, Kripke used the well-known urban legend of the vanishing hitchhiker, but combined it with the Mexican legend of La Llorona to give the spirit more motivation and characterization. The ghost was younger in an earlier version of script, and murdered her parents instead of her children; this was revised to allow for the casting of an older actress.

Originally, the studio did not want Kripke to kill Jessica at the episode's end, but rather keep her as a recurring character in the series. Kripke felt this would not fit the series's format, and decided to have her revealed as a demon, with the revelation prompting Sam to join Dean in hunting. However, with only a short amount of screentime available to depict this, Kripke believed it would be a "tough aspect to sell". Because Luke Skywalker only begins his journey after the deaths of his aunt and uncle, Kripke found it more appropriate for Sam's motivation to be Jessica's death. Thus, the character is killed in the same manner as Sam's mother, making the deaths the "right bookends".

=== Filming ===
Principal photography for the pilot took place in Los Angeles, though subsequent episodes of the series are filmed in Vancouver, British Columbia to save money. The bridge sequences were shot at Lake Piru, near a War of the Worlds filming location, and the library and phone booth scenes were filmed at an elementary school. Triplet babies portrayed Sam in the episode's teaser, and production found it difficult to get them to cry on cue. Though a real house served as the first-story level in the teaser, the upstairs was constructed on a sound stage because of the special effects required for Mary's fiery death. Script rewrites for the opening sequence—a better introduction for Sam was needed—required reshoots on the set of The O.C. two months after principal photography.

=== Effects ===
To depict the supernatural aspects of the show, the series makes use of visual, special, and make-up effects, as well as stuntwork. Businesses, such as visual effects company Entity FX, were contracted for production of the pilot episode. Subsequent episodes were filmed in Vancouver and required a new crew that works exclusively for the show. Mary Winchester's death scene, which had the character pinned to the ceiling and burning to death, required actress Samantha Smith to lie on a floor with two propane pipes spouting fire approximately five feet away from her on either side. For the actual burning of the character, a fake body the crew named "Christina" was made out of wire and papier-mâché, and was then ignited on a fake ceiling. However, the room quickly caught fire, forcing an evacuation. Green screen coincided with the visual effects for the ghostly Woman in White, and executive producer McG chose to make the imagery of her death sequence an homage to Chris Cunningham's Aphex Twin video "Windowlicker". Japanese horror also influenced the scene, such as the school uniforms worn by the ghost children, the water cascading down the stairs, and the Dark Water elements.

=== Music ===
The episode's synthesized orchestral score was written by Christopher Lennertz, Kripke's friend and next-door neighbor. The two attended USC School of Cinematic Arts together, and worked together on various projects afterwards. Lennertz described Supernatural as "one of those dream situations where you get to work with someone who you admire, but also have a relationship with already", and noted he and Kripke "were already on the same page without even talking about [the series' music]".

For the scenes involving Mary and Jessica's deaths at the hands of the demon Azazel, Lennertz used a piano solo with discordant notes and reverberations to create a "really nasty" sounding echo effect. He would later reuse this theme in the season one episode "Nightmare". The episode also included a number of rock songs, which would become a tradition for the series. Kripke wanted to feature the song "Enter Sandman", but Metallica would not grant permission.

== Reception ==
In its original broadcast, the pilot was viewed by an estimated 5.69 million viewers. The episode received mixed reviews from critics. Diana Steenbergen of IGN, who was "hooked right away", gave the pilot episode a score of 8.5 out of 10. She felt it began "heartbreakingly", and the "genuinely scary" death scenes of Mary and Jess "will haunt...the viewers". Steenbergen praised both the writers and the lead actors for making the "[exposition scenes] still feel natural, for the most part", and noted Ackles and Padalecki were "instantly convincing as brothers". Also credited for this "well paced" episode was director David Nutter, who did an "excellent job of setting up the atmosphere and tone of the series". Likewise, BuddyTV's Don Williams posited, "It's about as good as a pilot can get." He ranked it ninth out of his favorite episodes of the first three seasons, believing it introduces the characters "in a memorable fashion" and "wonderfully" establishes the show's universe. Robert Bianco of USA Today deemed the series as possibly "the simplest and the scariest" of the season's new dark shows, and wrote, "It wants nothing more than to frighten you—and tonight, it does." He noted the episode "[pulls] off a few surprises" and "works its way to an ending that lives up to Dean's 'no chick-flick moments'". However, Bianco criticized the "pauses for comic relief"; he felt Ackles' "comic touch" was "not yet as skillful as it needs to be", with Ackles' attempts at being "humorously annoying" leaving him "simply annoying". Despite the episode having a somewhat unoriginal villain and a "relatively simple" solution, Brian Lowry of Variety deemed the series' debut as "a promising plunge into the darkness". Lowry applauded Ackles, who "brings an easygoing charm and engaging wise-ass personality to the absurd notion of traveling the country with a trunk full of wooden stakes and holy water".

Alessandra Stanley of The New York Times found the first half of the episode "quite effective", with the "camera angles, spooky music and jumpy sequences...[being] as frightening as those found in any horror movie, with an added twist of suspense". However, she deemed the depiction of the ghostly villain as "pretty silly", and noted the second half "stops building suspense and turns predictable". Calling the series "Ghostbusters' Creek", Stanley felt the episode "reverts to a WB family drama about the bonds between two mismatched brothers and their father". Similarly, Matthew Gilbert of the Boston Globe called Ackles and Padalecki "generic cuties who hold their lips together tightly, except to utter the word 'Dude'". Although Gilbert noted there are a couple "moderately creepy" twists, he found there to be "nothing about the central family story in Supernatural or its bland actors that makes it addictive".

Work on the pilot episode garnered two Emmy Award nominations in 2006. Lennertz was nominated in the category of "Outstanding Music Composition For A Series (Dramatic Underscore)", and the sound editors (Note: Michael Lawshe (Supervising Sound Editor), Timothy Cleveland (Sound Effects Editor), Paul Diller (Sound Effects Editor), Marc Meyer (Sound Effects Editor), David Lynch (Sound Effects Editor), Jessica Dickson (Dialog Editor), Karyn Foster (Dialog/ADR Editor), Chris McGeary (Music Editor), David Lee Fein (Foley Artist), and Jody Thomas (Foley Artist)) for "Outstanding Sound Editing for a Series".
