= Acheri =

Figure in Indian mythology

An Acheri is a spirit of a young girl in the folklore of the southern Himalayas, specifically regions around Kumaon. They often dwell on top of mountains during the day and come down at dusk to hold revel. They are not peaceful, as to come across them, during a revel, could lead to death or molestation. They are often associated with disease, as they would cast their shadow over children to inflict them with incurable diseases. In their name, wearing a scarlet thread around your throat would protect you from colds and goitre.

== Folklore ==
An Acheri is a spirit of a young girl (and in many accounts women) who died a violent death. Acheris are also referred to as "hill fairies", "Bhúts", and "hill godlings".

It is said that they dwell during the day in the mountains or hilltops, and at dusk they descend to hold revel. It is often unwise to visit the places where the revels, regardless of if the Acheri are present or not. They are also said to bring disease to children (and sometimes others) who come in contact with their shadow (Cháyá).

According to the separate accounts of William Crooke and Edwin Thomas Atkinson, one who wears a scarlet thread around their throat would be protected from colds and goitre. Although some unreliable accounts state that one may wear red clothes or pearls as a form of protection, the majority of accounts point to red garments as only serving as a target for the Acheri's anger, as William Crooke claims them to have an antipathy to the color red.

Another aspect often ascribed to the Acheri are numerous optical phenomena that present themselves on many of the nearby mountains. The only example provided in the lore is the shadow of a procession that includes "elephants, horses, &c.".

== Origins ==
Over platforms such as Reddit and fandoms, people often debate about the origins of the Acheri. A common belief is that the Acheri originates from Native American folklore, which originates from Michael Page's Encyclopedia of Things that Never Were. Page's writings have faced criticism by many online users for being overly imaginative, especially with non-European myths.

On the other hand, the idea that the Acheri comes from South Asian folklore bears significantly more evidence. More specifically, the 1828 Asiatic Researches Volume 16 helps pin the Acheri's origin to the South Asian region. Further works such as the 1859 Ethnology of India by Robert Gordon Latham, the 1883 Notes on the Religion of the Himalayans by Edwin Thomas Atkinson, and the 1926 Religion and Folklore of Northern India by William Crooke help pinpoint the Acheri to have originated near the Southern Himalayans.

In Robert Gordon Latham's account of South Asian folklore, he states that every village in Kumaon has "its own especial deity", and shrines of these deities could be found over the whole country. His account helps us understand how the Acheri came to be, saying that "an individual who died a violent death may revisit the Earth as a "Bhút" to haunt future generations, only appeased by sacrifices and offerings.
