= Jessica Harmon =

Canadian actress (born 1985)

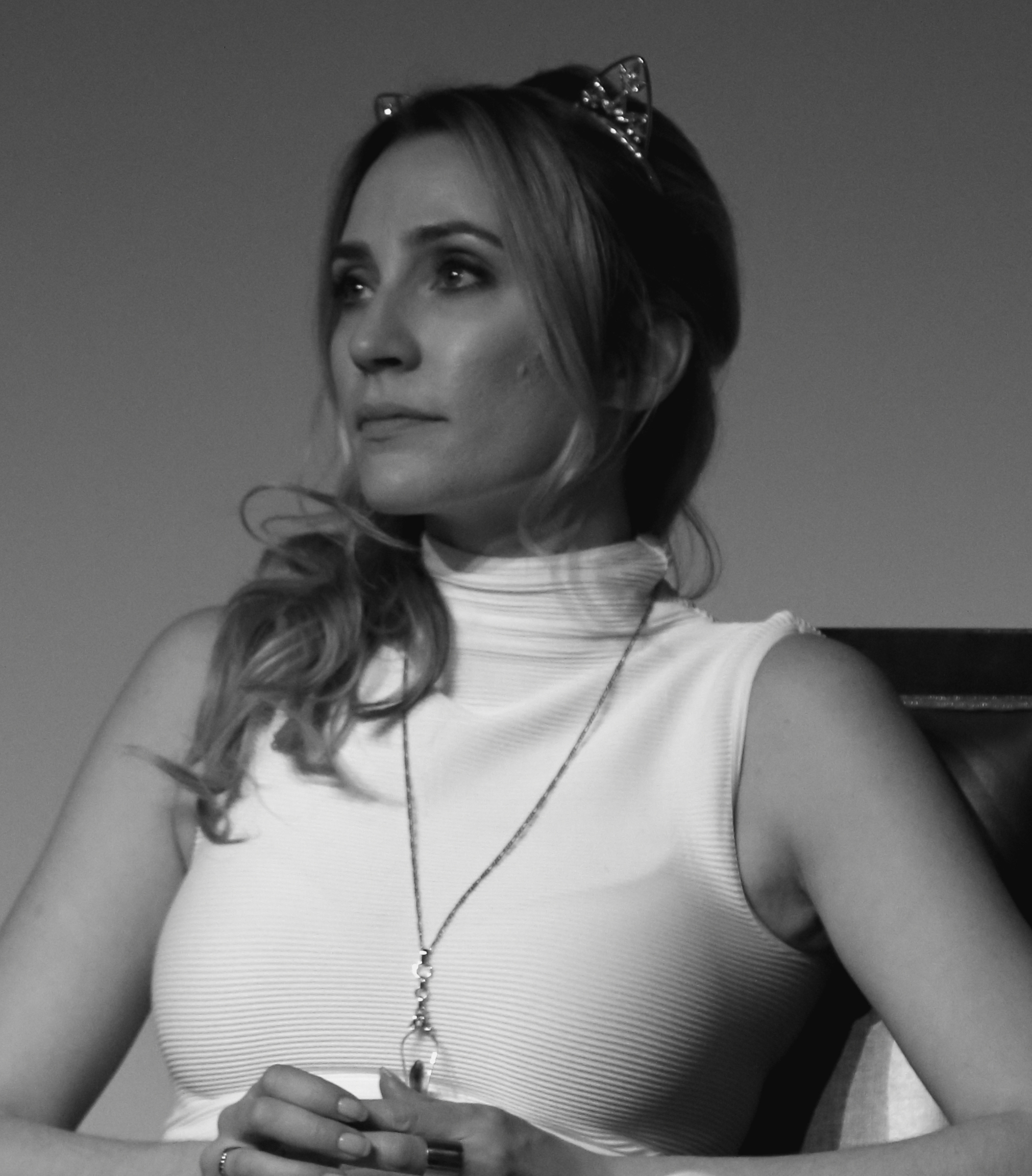
- Harmon in 2017
- Born: Jessica Noelle Harmon; December 27, 1985 (age 40); Barrie, Ontario, Canada
- Occupation: Actress
- Years active: 1997–present
- Children: 1
- Relatives: Richard Harmon (brother)

Jessica Harmon (born December 27, 1985) is a Canadian actress and director. She portrayed Esrin in the Syfy science fiction web series Battlestar Galactica: The Face of the Enemy (2008–2009), FBI Agent Dale Bozzio in the CW supernatural drama series iZombie (2015–2019), and Niylah in the CW science fiction drama series The 100 (2016–2020).

Harmon co-starred as Megan Helms in the slasher film Black Christmas (2006), Heather Dalton in the science fiction horror film Hollow Man 2 (2006), and as Jill Eikland in the action horror film Dead Rising: Endgame (2016). In 2010, she won a Leo Award for Best Performance in a Music, Comedy, or Variety Program or Series for her role in the television pilot Wolf Canyon.

== Early life ==
Jessica Harmon was born on December 27, 1985, in Barrie, Ontario, Canada. Her parents are director Allan Harmon and producer Cynde Harmon. Her brother is actor Richard Harmon, with whom she co-starred in the CW science fiction series The 100.

Despite her surname, Harmon and her brother are not related to the actor Mark Harmon, nor to his family, the Harmon–Nelson family (a well-known California show business family).

== Filmography ==
=== Film ===
Year	Title	Role	Notes
2003	Agent Cody Banks	Natalie's Friend	
2006	Hollow Man 2	Heather Dalton	Direct-to-video
2006	John Tucker Must Die	Girl at Party	Uncredited
2006	Black Christmas	Megan Helms	
2008	The Ambassador	Nina	Short film
2012	A Christmas Story 2	Female Shopper	
2013	The Marine 3: Homefront	Teller	Direct-to-video
2013	And Now a Word from Our Sponsor	Car Saleswoman	
2013	The Goodbye Girl	Sylvia Rose	Short film
2013	If I Had Wings	Mrs. McVie	
2014	Body Language	Oleander	Short film
2014	Deeper	Beth	
2015	Reset	Natalie	Short film
2015	Outside the Lines	Trish	Short film
2015	Bona Fide	Celeste	Short film
2016	PLAN b	Tracy	Short film
2016	Dead Rising: Endgame	Jill Eikland	
2017	Heart of Clay	Justine	
2018	The Age of Adulting	Jill	

=== Television ===
Year	Title	Role	Notes
1997–1998	The Outer Limits	Tali	2 episodes
1998	The New Addams Family	Juvenile Delinquent	Episode: "Wednesday Leaves Home"
2001–2002	Pasadena	Mona	2 episodes
2004	The Days	Trish	Episode: "Day 1,403"
2004	Life As We Know It	Zoe Cresswell	6 episodes
2006	Killer Instinct	Jennifer Crossland	Episode: "Love Hurts"
2006	Whister	Danni Bender	Episode: "The Burden of Truth"
2007	Passion's Web	Lynn	Television film
2007, 2013	Supernatural	Lily Baker / Olivia Camrose	Episodes: "All Hell Breaks Loose: Part 1" and "Dog Dean Afternoon"
2008	Whister	Natalie Webley	2 episodes
2008–2009	Battlestar Galactica: The Face of the Enemy	Esrin	10 episodes
2009	Trust	Kelyn	Television film
2009	Kyle XY	Gretchen	Episode: "Life Support"
2009	Encounter with Danger	Monique	Television film
2009	Everything She Ever Wanted	Debbie	2 episodes
2009	Fear Island	Ashley	Television film
2009	Wolf Canyon	Samantha	Unsold pilot
2012	Choose Your Victim	Katrina Schneider	8 episodes
2012	Anything But Christmas	Faith	Television film
2013	Emily Owens, M.D.	Diana	Episode: "Emily and... The Leap"
2013	Arrow	Nancy Moore	Episode: "Home Invasion"
2013	Romeo Killer: The Chris Porco Story	Reporter #2	Television film
2013	Animism	Mel / Boy (voice)	Voice; unknown episodes
2013	Chupacabra vs. The Alamo	Jenny	Television film
2013	Christmas Bounty	Jessica / Bartender	Television film
2014	Signed, Sealed, Delivered	Donna	Episode: "Time to Start Livin'"
2014	Stolen from the Womb	Vivian	Television film
2014	Motive	Maya Bureen	Episode: "Abandoned"
2014	Along Came a Nanny	Cookie	Television film
2015	Backstrom	Nurse Brittany Gottman	Episode: "Give Til It Hurts"
2015	Love Under the Stars	Amy	Television film
2015	The Returned	Janelle	Episode: "Peter"
2015	'Tis the Season for Love	Eileen	Television film
2015	Wayward Pines	Woman #1	Episode: "Where Paradise Is Home"
2015	Olympus	Chalciope	4 episodes
2015	The Whispers	Team Member 3 Willa	3 episodes
2015	Proof	Samantha Glenn	Episode: "Tsunami: Part One"
2015–2019	iZombie	Dallas Anne Bozzio	Recurring role; 32 episodes
2016–2020	The 100	Niylah	Recurring role; 31 episodes Also director; 1 episode
2016	Stranger in the House	Dr. Harding	Television film
2016	The Magicians	Mackenzie	Episode: "The Mayakovsky Circumstance"
2017	Final Vision	Colette MacDonald	Television film
2017	Hard Days, Wet Nights	Jill	Unsold pilot
2017	Taken	Gretchen Lareau	Episode: "Hail Mary"
2017	Somewhere Between	Mimi	Episode: "Fate Takes a Holiday"
2018	The Bletchley Circle: San Francisco	Lydia Nolan	2 episodes
2019	The Murders	Alicia Bennett	Episode: "Toxic"
2019	Tempting Fate	Clair	Television film
2019	V Wars	Jessica Swann	2 episodes

=== Director ===
Year	Title	Notes
2020	The 100	Episode: "A Sort of Homecoming"
2020	My Best Friend's Bouquet	Hallmark Channel movie
2020	The Angel Tree	Hallmark Movies & Mysteries movie
2021	The Vows We Keep	Hallmark Movies & Mysteries movie
2021	Fixing Up Christmas	UP TV movie
2021	Serving Up the Holidays	Lifetime movie
2021	A Christmas Star	Great American Family movie; Also co-producer
2022	Girl in the Shed: The Kidnapping of Abby Hernandez	Lifetime movie
2022	Rip in Time	Hallmark Movies & Mysteries movie
2022	My Mom Made Me Do It	Lifetime movie
2022	Game, Set, Love!	Hallmark Channel movie
2022	Fit for Christmas	CBS movie
2023	A Paris Proposal	Hallmark Channel movie
2023	Dream Moms	Hallmark Channel movie
2023	Aurora Teagarden Mysteries: Something New	Hallmark Movies & Mysteries movie
2023	Joyeux Noel	Hallmark Channel movie
2024	Tipline Mysteries: Dial 1 for Murder	Hallmark Mystery movie; co-directed with Cynde Harmon
2024	Aurora Teagarden Mysteries: A Lesson In Murder	Hallmark+ movie
2024	Aurora Teagarden Mysteries: Death at the Diner	Hallmark+ movie
2025	Catch of the Day	Hallmark Channel movie
2025	Monster in the Family: The Stacey Kananen Story	Lifetime movie
2026	I'll Be Seeing You	Hallmark Channel movie
