= Samantha Smith (actress) =

American actress

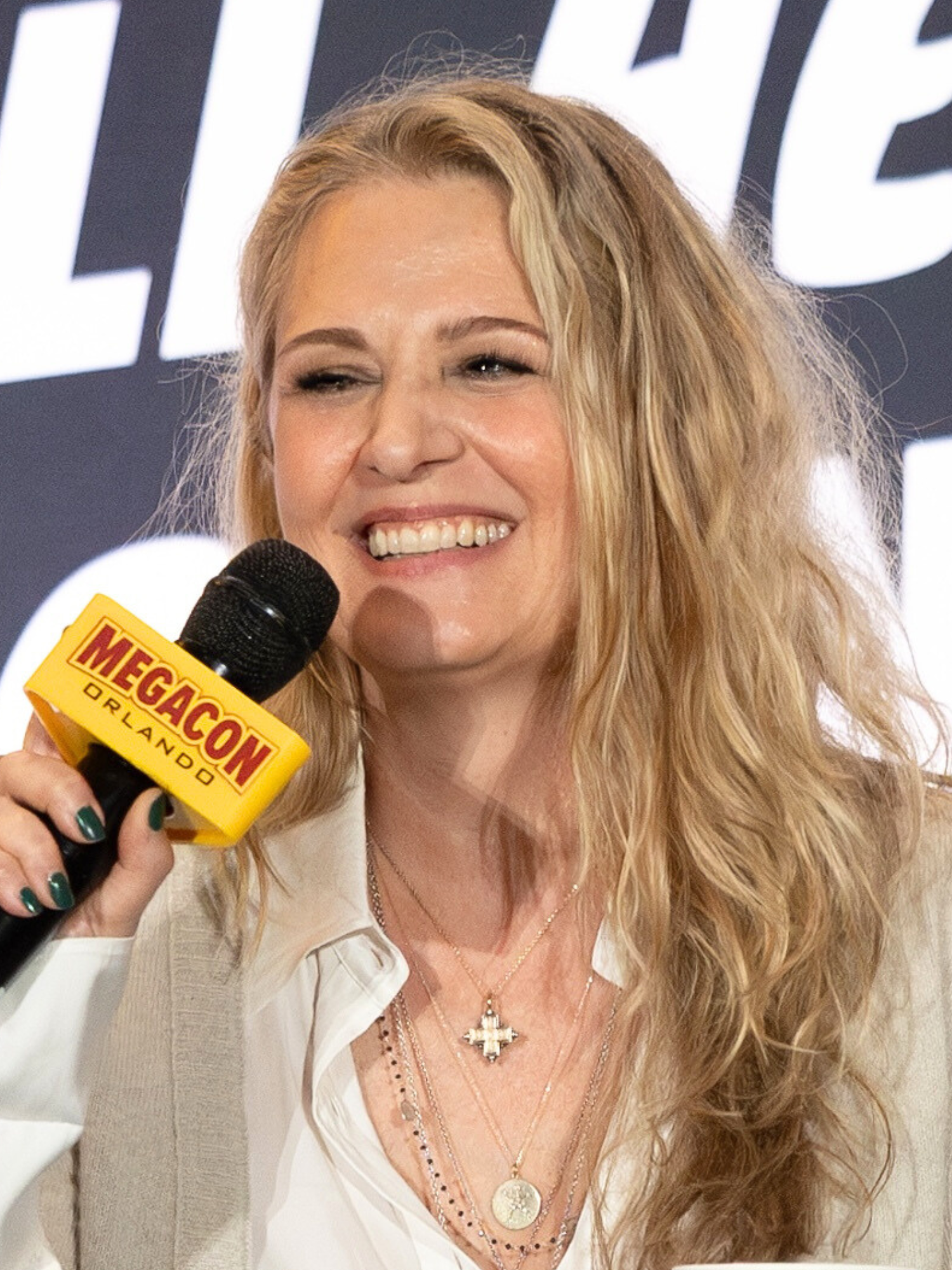
- Smith at MegaCon Orlando in 2025
- Education: UCLA
- Occupation: Actress
- Years active: 1996–present

Samantha A. Smith is an American actress. She is known for her role as Mary Winchester on Supernatural.

== Career ==
Smith began her career as a teenage model. She moved to Los Angeles and planned on doing commercials to support herself while she attended UCLA. She was in an HBO commercial that aired during the Super Bowl; this exposure led to her finding an agent and beginning her acting career.

Her most notable role is Mary Winchester on the paranormal and fantasy TV series Supernatural. She has also had guest appearances on Rizzoli & Isles, Friends and Criminal Minds. Her film work includes Jerry Maguire and Transformers.

== Personal life ==
Smith is married and has a son.

== Filmography ==
=== Film ===
Year	Title	Role	Notes
1996	Jerry Maguire	Former Girlfriend	
1998	The Truth About Juliet	Juliet	
2000	What Planet Are You From?	Flight Attendant	
2002	Dragonfly	Waitress	
2007	Transformers	Sarah Lennox	
2010	The Chosen One	Christine	
2016	The Devil's Dolls	Amy	
2017	Stephanie	Doctor	

=== Television ===
Year	Production	Role	Notes
1996	Seinfeld	Hallie	Episode: "The Friars Club"
1996–2000	Nash Bridges	Kerry/Susan Porter	2 episodes
1997	Wings	Shannon Carson	Episode: "Dreamgirl"
1997	The Pretender	Kimberly Green	Episode: "Exposed"
1998	Silk Stalkings	Alex	Episode: "Three Ring Circus"
1998	Pacific Blue	Allie McGuire	Episode: "Heat of the Moment"
1998	Caroline in the City	Monica	2 episodes
1998	Buddy Faro	Cookie Logan	Episode: "Touched by an Amnesiac"
1998–1999	Two of a Kind	Nancy Carlson	5 episodes
1999	Cold Feet	Gina	Episode: "Trying to Do the Right Thing"
1999	Rockin' Good Times	Nicky	1 episode (credited as "Sam Smith")
1999	Friends	Jen	Episode: "The One with Rachel's Inadvertent Kiss"
1999	Family Law	Cindy	2 episodes
1999	Avalon: Beyond the Abyss	Dr. Hannah Nygaard	TV movie
1999	Time of Your Life	Jessica	2 episodes
1999–2000	Profiler	Kate Wilton	4 episodes
2000	Noriega: God's Favorite	Yogi	TV movie
2000	Bull	Jennifer	Episode: "One Night in Bangkok"
2000	The Weber Show	Hannah	Episode: "Pilot"
2001	Dark Angel	Daphne	Episode: "Art Attack"
2001	Just Shoot Me!	Stella Rudin	Episode: "At Long Last Allie"
2002	Fidel	Reporter	TV movie
2002	Watching Ellie	Diange Singer	Episode: "Wedding"
2002	Philly	Karen Caulfield	Episode: "Tall Tales"
2002	Presidio Med		Episode: "This Baby's Gonna Fly"
2004	The Division	Lynn Dart	Episode: "What's Love Got to Do with It?"
2004	NYPD Blue	Corrine O'Malley	Episode: "You're Buggin' Me"
2005–2019	Supernatural	Mary Winchester	35 episodes
2006	Monk	Coach Hayden	Episode: "Mr. Monk and the Big Game"
2007	Criminal Minds	Helen Douglas	Episode: "The Big Game"
2007	McBride: Dogged	Laurie Carter	TV film
2007	Love's Unending Legacy	Marty Davis	TV movie
2007	Love's Unfolding Dream	Marty Davis	TV movie
2009	Trust Me	Beverly	Episode: "Au Courant"
2010	House	Lulu	Episode: "A Pox on Our House"
2012	NCIS: Los Angeles	NCIS Agent Bell	Episode: "Blye, K."
2014	Intelligence	Susan Hawkins	Episode: "Secrets of the Secret Service"
2014	The Mentalist	Sylvia Hennigan	Episode: "Violets"
2014	Recorded Lives		Episode: "This Baby's Gonna Fly"
2015	Rizzoli & Isles	Mary Hope	2 episodes
2015	Con Man	Stewardess	2 episodes
2022	9-1-1	Captain Pamela Shore	Episode: "May Day"
2022	Star Trek: Strange New Worlds	Eldredth	Episode: "Strange New Worlds"
2022	Star Trek: Prodigy	Huur'A (voice)	Episode: "All the World's A Stage"
2024	FBI: Most Wanted	Therapist	Episode: "Above and Beyond"
