= Cully Hamner =

American comic book artist (born 1969)

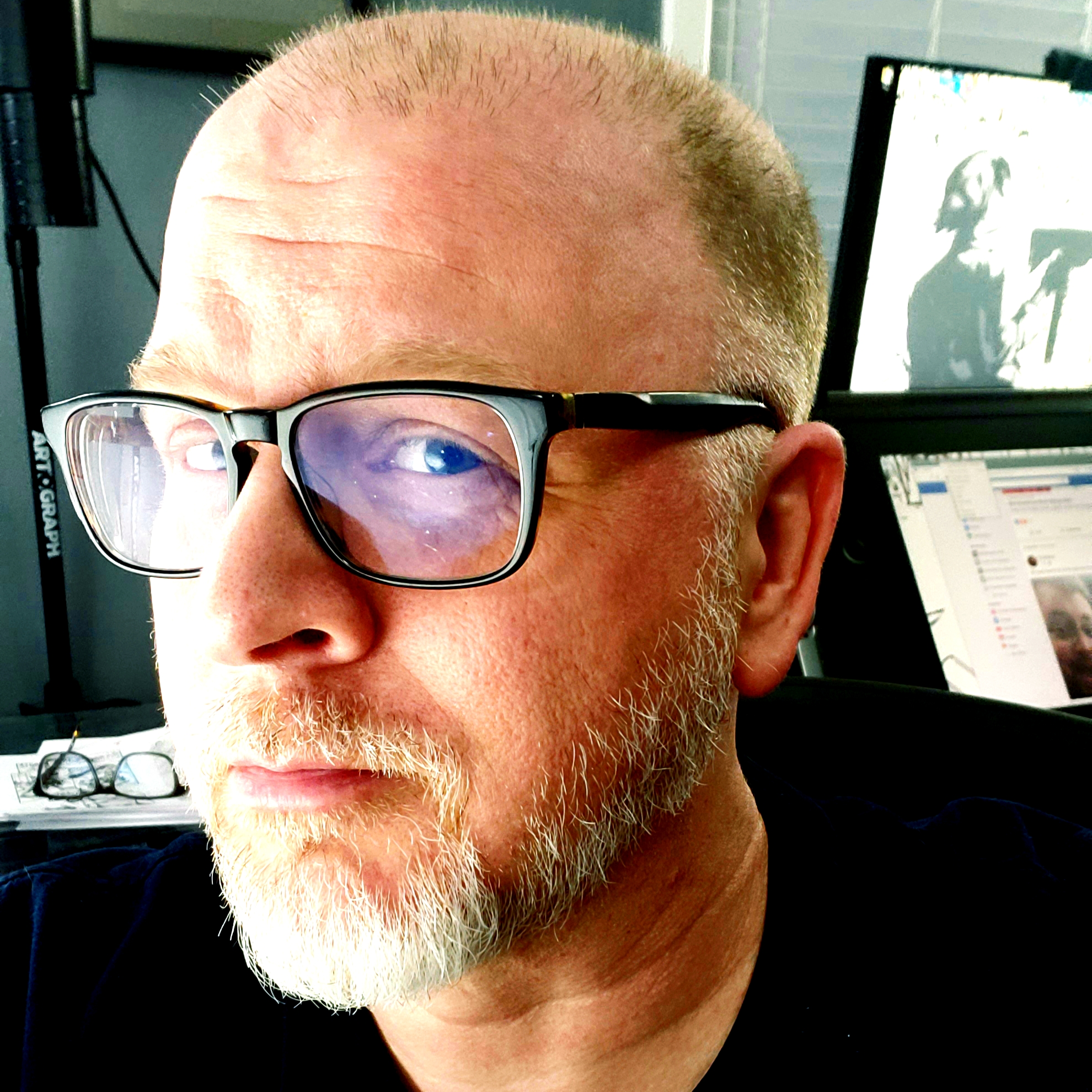
- Hamner in 2020
- Born: March 7, 1969 (age 57) Huntsville, Alabama, U.S.
- Areas: Penciller, Inker
- Notable works: Green Lantern: Mosaic; Red; Blue Beetle; Black Lightning: Year One; Detective Comics

Cully Hamner (born March 7, 1969) is an American comic book artist, known for his work on such books as Green Lantern: Mosaic, Blue Beetle, Black Lightning: Year One, and Detective Comics. He is the co-creator and illustrator of the 2003 graphic novel Red, which was adapted into a 2010 feature film of the same name starring Bruce Willis, as well as a 2013 sequel. He is also the co-creator of Jaime Reyes, but Hamner's best known DC Comics contribution may be designing the New 52 Batsuit.

== Early life ==
Cully Hamner was born March 7, 1969 in Huntsville, Alabama. He graduated from Albert P. Brewer High School in Somerville, Alabama.

== Career ==
Since Hamner's 1992 debut on Green Lantern: Mosaic for DC Comics, he has worked for nearly every major American comic book publisher, and is chiefly known for such titles as the aforementioned Green Lantern: Mosaic, Blue Beetle, and Red. He is also one of the original members of Atlanta's Gaijin Studios. Hamner also helped start and acted as Creative Consultant to 12 Gauge Comics, publisher of such titles as The Ride, Gun Candy, Body Bags, and O.C.T.: The Occult Crimes Taskforce.

His work can be seen in Top Cow's 2005 Warren Ellis series Down. That same year in DC Comics' "Infinite Crisis" storyline, the publisher debuted Jaime Reyes, the third incarnation of the superhero Blue Beetle co-created by Keith Giffen, John Rogers, and Hamner, and whose visual look was designed by Hamner. He was the regular artist for that character's monthly series in 2006 and 2007, leaving that title with its tenth issue, though he continued throughout the following year as the regular cover artist for that book. Black Lightning: Year One, written by Jen Van Meter and illustrated by Hamner, was released in 2009 as a miniseries and as a trade paperback collection in 2010, and was subsequently nominated for two Glyph Awards.

In March 2009, it was announced that Hamner had signed an exclusive contract with DC Comics, and in June 2009, he began his run on the monthly Detective Comics, featuring The Question. After concluding his year-long tenure on that character and in light of the pending release of the film version of Red, it was announced that Hamner would return to both write and illustrate the Paul Moses character for a 40-page prequel called Red: Eyes Only.

Hamner with RED director Robert Schwentke, at the premiere of the film version of Red at Grauman's Chinese Theater in Hollywood California, October 12, 2010.

In 2010, Summit Entertainment released Red, a feature film adaptation of the 2003 comic book of the same name that Hamner illustrated with writer Warren Ellis, starring Bruce Willis, Morgan Freeman, Helen Mirren, John Malkovich and Richard Dreyfuss.

On June 9, 2011, it was revealed by DC Comics co-publisher Jim Lee that Hamner had been enlisted in a substantial role to help guide the initiative to redesign DC's stable of characters as part of the "New 52" line-wide relaunch. On July 12, Comic Book Resources reported DC's announcement that Hamner would be teaming with writer James Dale Robinson for the first three-issue story arc of a new 12-issue series starring The Shade. Among these tasks, Hamner was given the opportunity to design the new standard Batsuit for this continuity. The black trunks were removed from Batman's gray bodysuit for the longest period in the character's history, where it had only occasionally appeared that way in the late 90's.

On July 19, 2013, Red 2, the sequel to Red, was released in North America. The film stars Bruce Willis, John Malkovich, Mary-Louise Parker, Catherine Zeta-Jones, Lee Byung-hun, Anthony Hopkins, and Helen Mirren, with Dean Parisot directing a screenplay by Jon and Erich Hoeber. In its opening weekend, the film grossed $18.5 million and finished in fifth place, which was lower than the $21.8 million its predecessor earned in October 2010. According to exit polling, 67% of the audience was over 35 and 52% was male. Red 2 grossed $53.3 million in North America and $94.8 million overseas for a total of $148.1 million worldwide.

In the spring of 2015, Hamner reteamed with writer Greg Rucka to produce a two-issue coda to their run on the Renee Montoya character in Detective Comics. Convergence: The Question was released by DC Entertainment in April and May 2015.

On August 14, 2015, it was announced that NBC was developing an hour-long based Red television series produced by screenwriters Jon Hoeber and Erich Hoeber, along with Lorenzo di Bonaventura and Mark Vahradian. Lionsgate Television and Di Bonaventura Pictures Television would be producing the series.

On June 17, 2016, Lionsgate announced that it would be teaming with Indian actor/producer Anil Kapoor's AKFC production banner on a Hindi version of Red for the Indian market.

On June 21, 2017, Red producer Lorenzo di Bonaventura stated that a script for Red 3 had been commissioned, and that he was "waiting for [it] right now."

In August 2017, it was announced in The Hollywood Reporter that Hamner would be returning to DC Comics to illustrate Batman And The Signal, a three-issue mini-series teaming Batman and the Duke Thomas character (now known as The Signal). The series is written by Scott Snyder and newcomer Tony Patrick (a graduate of the DC Comics Writers Workshop).

In August 2023, Warner Bros. released the feature film version of Blue Beetle, directed by Ángel Manuel Soto and starring Xolo Maridueña, Susan Sarandon, and George Lopez. The film centers around Hamner's co-creation, Blue Beetle (Jaime Reyes).

== Bibliography ==
=== Comics series ===
- Batman And The Signal #1–3 (2017), with writers Scott Snyder and Tony Patrick
- Convergence: The Question #1–2 (2015), with writer Greg Rucka
- Legends of the Dark Knight #80–82 (2015), with writer Ron Marz
- Future's End, Week 21 (2014), with writer Jeff Lemire
- Animal Man #36 (2014), with writer Jeff Lemire
- Flash Annual #2 (2013), with writer NiCole DuBuc
- Action Comics Annual #1 (2012), with writer Sholly Fisch
- Action Comics #14 (2012), with writer Sholly Fisch
- National Comics: Eternity #1 (2012), with writer Jeff LeMire
- The Shade #1–3 (2011), with writer James Dale Robinson
- Detective Comics #854–865 (2009–2010), serial co-feature "The Question," with writer Greg Rucka
- Black Lightning: Year One #1–6 (2009) with writer Jen Van Meter
- Blue Beetle #1, 2, 4, 7, 8, 10 (2006–2007) with writers Keith Giffen and John Rogers
- Down #2–4 (2005–2006) with writer Warren Ellis for Top Cow
- Red 3-issue miniseries (2003–2004) with writer Warren Ellis for Wildstorm
- Batman: Tenses 2-issue miniseries (2003) with writer Joe Casey for DC Comics
- Uncanny X-Men #400 (2001) with writer Joe Casey for Marvel Comics
- The Titans #14 (2000) with writers Brian K. Vaughn and Devin Grayson for DC Comics
- Wonder Woman #153 (2000) (finishes) with artist Georges Jeanty and writer Mark Millar for DC Comics
- Green Lantern Secret Files (1999) with writer Ron Marz for DC Comics
- Tom Strong #3 (1999) with writer Alan Moore and artist Chris Sprouse for America's Best Comics
- Daredevil #379 (1998) with writer Scott Lobdell for Marvel Comics
- Daredevil #376 (1998) with writer Scott Lobdell for Marvel Comics
- Uncanny X-Men #352 (1998) with writer Steven T. Seagle for Marvel Comics
- Robin #42, 46 (1997), (layouts) with writer Chuck Dixon for DC Comics
- Penthouse Comix #23 (1996) for General Media
- Men's Adventure Comix #3 (1996) for General Media
- Captain America: Sentinel of Liberty #8 (1996) with writer Mark Waid for Marvel Comics
- Green Lantern #58 (1995) with writer Ron Marz for DC Comics
- Firearm (1994–1995) with writer James Dale Robinson for Malibu Comics
- Silver Surfer #83 (1993) with writer Ron Marz for Marvel Comics
- Green Lantern: Mosaic #1–5, 7–10, 12, 13, and 15 (1992–1993) with writer Gerard Jones for DC Comics

=== Comics anthologies and one-shots ===
- Red: Eyes Only one-shot (2010), both written and illustrated by Hamner.
- Metal Hurlant anthology (2005), Pieces De Rechange (Spare Parts) with writer Stuart Moore for Les Humanoides
- Star Wars Tales anthology (2005), Marked with writer Rob Williams for Dark Horse Comics
- Spider-Man Unlimited anthology (2005), Amnesiac with writer Petar Bridges for Marvel Comics
- The Ride: 2 For The Road anthology (2005), Big Plans both story and art for 12 Gauge Comics
- The Ride: Wheels Of Change anthology (2004), Act One with writer Doug Wagner for 12 Gauge Comics
- Marvel Universe: Millennial Visions anthology (2002), Power Pack for Marvel Comics
- Wildstorm Summer Special anthology (2001), Orbital with writer Warren Ellis for Wildstorm
- Weird Western Tales anthology #4 (2001), Savaged with writer Bruce Jones for Vertigo Comics
- Young Justice: Sins of Youth Secret Files anthology #1 (2001) for DC Comics
- Gen-Active anthology #5 (2001), Father's Day with writer Jay Faerber for Wildstorm
- DCU 2000 Secret Files one-shot (2000), Aliens in the DCU for DC Comics
- X-Men Unlimited anthology #29 (2000), Tempered Steel both story and art for Marvel Comics
- Authority Annual 2000 one-shot (2000) with writer Joe Casey for Wildstorm
- X-Men: Millennial Visions anthology (2000), Project: Cerebro-X for Marvel Comics
- Superman Metropolis Secret Files anthology (2000), Municipal Bonds with writer Mark Schultz for DC Comics
- DC One Million 80-Page Giant anthology (1999), The Divided Self with writer Grant Morrison for DC Comics
- Secret Origins 80-Page Giant anthology (1998), Little Wing with writer Chuck Dixon for DC Comics
- Timeslip Collection anthology (1998), Sub-Mariner for Marvel Comics
- Superman Villains Secret Files anthology (1998), Your Power is His (Parasite) with writer Roger Stern for Marvel Comics
- Batman Chronicles anthology #9 (1997), (layouts) for DC Comics
- Stormwatch Special one-shot #2 (1995) with writer Ron Marz for Image Comics/Wildstorm

=== Pin-ups and covers ===
- Kingsman: The Red Diamond #4 (2017), cover-only
- The Shade #1–3 (2011), variant covers
- Red: Eyes Only one-shot (2010), for Wildstorm
- Red, four movie prequel one-shots, for Wildstorm
- Black Lightning: Year One mini-series (2009) #1–6 covers
- Blue Beetle #1–2, 10, 13–24 covers
- Red mini-series (2003), covers
- Batman: Tenses mini-series (2003), covers
- Transmetropolitan: I Hate it Here anthology (2000)
- Day of Judgment Secret Files anthology (1999), profile: The Phantom Stranger
- Legion of Super-Heroes Secret Files anthology (1999), Ferro
- Superman Secret Files anthology (1999), Gog pin-up
- Legion: Secret Files anthology (1998), Ultra Boy pin-up
- Legion of Super-Heroes #100, untitled pin-up
- Daredevil #376–379 (1998), covers
- Robin #42–51 (1997–1998), regular cover artist
- JLA Gallery (1997), untitled pin-up
- The Foot Soldiers (1996), untitled pin-up
- Batman Chronicles Gallery #1 (1996), Gaijin jam pin-up
- Wildstorm Ultimate Sports #1 (1996), untitled pin-up
- Sovereign Seven Plus 1 (1996), untitled pin-up
- Shi: Senryaku #3 (1995), untitled pin-up
- Grendel Warchild TPB (1995), untitled pin-up
- WildC.A.T.S. Adventures Sourcebook #1 (1995), untitled pin-up
- Hawkman Annual #2 (1995), Golden-age Hawkman pin-up
- Team Youngblood #12 (1995), untitled pin-up
- Homage Studios Swimsuit Special #1 (1994), untitled pin-up
- Amazing Heroes Spoof Swimsuit Special #1 (1993), untitled pin-up
- Red Sonja #4 Dynamite Entertainment (2005), cover

== Awards and recognition ==
- Nominated for two 2010 Glyph Awards (Best Male Character and Fan Award for Best Comic), both for Black Lightning: Year One, alongside writer Jen Van Meter.
- June 2011 Inkwell Awards Ambassador (June 2011 – present)
- GLAAD Media Award For Outstanding Comic Book for Detective Comics, by Greg Rucka, JH Williams III, and Cully Hamner
