= Red 2 (film) =

2013 film directed by Dean Parisot

- Theatrical release poster
- Directed by: Dean Parisot
- Written by: Jon Hoeber; Erich Hoeber
- Based on: Characters by: Warren Ellis; Cully Hamner
- Produced by: Lorenzo di Bonaventura; Mark Vahradian
- Starring: Bruce Willis; John Malkovich; Mary-Louise Parker; Anthony Hopkins; Helen Mirren; Catherine Zeta-Jones; Byung Hun Lee; Brian Cox; Neal McDonough
- Cinematography: Enrique Chediak
- Edited by: Don Zimmerman
- Music by: Alan Silvestri
- Production company: Di Bonaventura Pictures
- Distributed by: Summit Entertainment (through Lionsgate)
- Release dates: July 11, 2013 (Westwood Village Theatre); July 19, 2013 (United States)
- Running time: 116 minutes
- Country: United States
- Language: English
- Budget: $84 million
- Box office: $148.1 million

Red 2 is a 2013 American action comedy film directed by Dean Parisot and written by Jon and Erich Hoeber, based on the comic book series Red by Warren Ellis and Cully Hamner. It is the sequel to Red (2010). The film stars Bruce Willis, John Malkovich, Mary-Louise Parker, Anthony Hopkins, Helen Mirren, Catherine Zeta-Jones, Byung Hun Lee, Brian Cox, and Neal McDonough. Red 2 premiered at the Westwood Village Theatre in Los Angeles California on July 11, 2013, and was released in the United States on July 19, by Summit Entertainment. The film received generally mixed reviews from critics. A sequel was announced as in-development in 2013 but did not come to fruition.

== Plot ==
Three years after the events of the previous film, ex-CIA operative Frank Moses tries to lead a normal life with girlfriend Sarah Ross. He dismisses Marvin Boggs' claims that enemies are still after them; Marvin drives off and his car explodes. Although Frank is unconvinced Marvin is dead, Sarah convinces him to attend Marvin's funeral where he delivers a tearful eulogy. Government agents interrogate Frank at an FBI Yankee White facility. Corrupt agent Jack Horton and a team of private military contractors ambush the facility; he threatens to torture Sarah until Frank gives him the information he needs. Frank evades Horton and with the help of the still living Marvin, goes on the run with Sarah.

Marvin explains he and Frank have been targeted as members of Operation Nightshade, a clandestine operation during the Cold War to smuggle a nuclear weapon into Russia. They learned that physicist Dr. Edward Bailey is the creator of the Nightshade bomb. Horton convinces international agencies that Frank and his associates are terrorists on the run. Frank's old ally Victoria notifies him that she has been contracted by MI6 to kill the fugitives. Another top contract killer, Han Cho-Bai, is also hired, seeking revenge against Frank.

Frank, Marvin, and Sarah steal Han's plane and fly to Paris to find "The Frog", with the Americans and Han in pursuit. They are met by Katja Petrokovich, a Russian secret agent with whom Frank had a relationship, who is also investigating Nightshade. They interrogate the Frog and Sarah, hoping to one-up Katja, seduces him.

The Frog gives them the key to his security box, which Katja takes after drugging Frank; Marvin, anticipating her double-cross, provided Frank with a similar key to give her. Marvin, Frank, and Sarah search the box themselves and find documents indicating that Bailey is alive, having been held for thirty-two years in a maximum security asylum for the criminally insane in London. Victoria, alerted by Marvin, ambushes the trio, but helps fake their deaths and infiltrate the asylum. They find the hyperactive Bailey, incapacitated by mind-fogging drugs, and bring him to Marvin's safehouse, where Bailey detoxes and remembers the location of the bomb.

In Moscow, Bailey confesses he hid the bomb in the Kremlin. There, the team locates the suitcase bomb, powered by red mercury. Katja stops them, but Frank persuades her to join their mission. They escape, but a call from Victoria, who has broken out of MI6 confinement for failing to kill him, reveals that Bailey was imprisoned because he wanted to detonate the bomb in Moscow. Holding Frank at gunpoint, the anti-Communist Bailey confirms Victoria's message, admitting he was the one who originally leaked word of Project Nightshade and made a deal to give Horton the bomb. He fatally shoots Katja, frames Frank, and leaves with the bomb. Horton reneges on their deal, intending to torture Bailey for all his secrets, but Bailey deploys a nerve gas and escapes to the Iranian embassy in London. In pursuit, Frank is attacked by Han. Reaching a standoff, Frank urges Han to join him in stopping Bailey; Han relents, and the five enact a plan to recapture the bomb.

Sarah seduces the Iranian ambassador and takes him hostage. Marvin poses as a potential defector, causing a diversion in the embassy that allows the team to enter disguised as plumbers. They learn the bomb's location, but Bailey has already triggered the timer and killed Horton (revealing that he wants revenge upon the entire 'espionage community' for their roles in locking him up and apparently killing his family). Bailey takes Sarah hostage and flees to Han's plane to escape the imminent explosion. Frank, Marvin, Victoria, and Han give chase, but Marvin's attempts to disarm the suitcase bomb cause the timer to count down even faster. Frank boards the plane and confronts Bailey with the suitcase. Bailey forces Frank to leave with Sarah and the suitcase. The plane explodes as it takes off, killing Bailey. Frank reveals that he hid the bomb aboard the plane. Han angrily demands $30 million for his plane and $20 million for not killing Frank.

The film ends as Sarah enjoys herself on a mission in Caracas with Frank and Marvin.

== Cast ==
- Bruce Willis as Frank Moses, a CIA black ops agent forced into retirement and tagged R.E.D. (Retired, Extremely Dangerous)
- John Malkovich as Marvin Boggs, a retired CIA agent who was given LSD daily for years as part of illegal agency experiments
- Helen Mirren as Victoria Winslow, a semi-retired MI6 assassin who still takes contracts on the side
- Mary-Louise Parker as Sarah Ross, Frank's girlfriend
- Anthony Hopkins as Dr. Edward Bailey, a British physicist and weapons developer who was imprisoned for 32 years
- Catherine Zeta-Jones as Major General Katja Petrokovich, an FSB agent and former love interest of Frank
- Brian Cox as Ivan Simanov, a retired FSB agent and Victoria's lover
- Byung-hun Lee as Han Cho Bai, an assassin and former NIS agent
- David Thewlis as The Frog, a black market information dealer and exquisite wine collector
- Neal McDonough as Jack Horton, a corrupt US intelligence agent
- Garrick Hagon as Davis, a high ranking corrupt member of the US Intelligence Community and Horton's boss
- Tim Pigott-Smith as Philips, Chief of the Secret Intelligence Service
- Philip Arditti as Arman, the Iranian Ambassador to the United Kingdom
- Jong Kun Lee as Han's father
- Mitchell Mullen as Wade
- Martin Sims as Blackwell
- Tristan Lalla as Vance
- Nathalie Buscombe as Serena, Han’s assistant
- Emma Heming Willis as Kelly
- Steven Berkoff as Cobb, a business executive and criminal who attempts to hire Han
- Titus Welliver as Burgess, a senior military intelligence officer

== Production ==
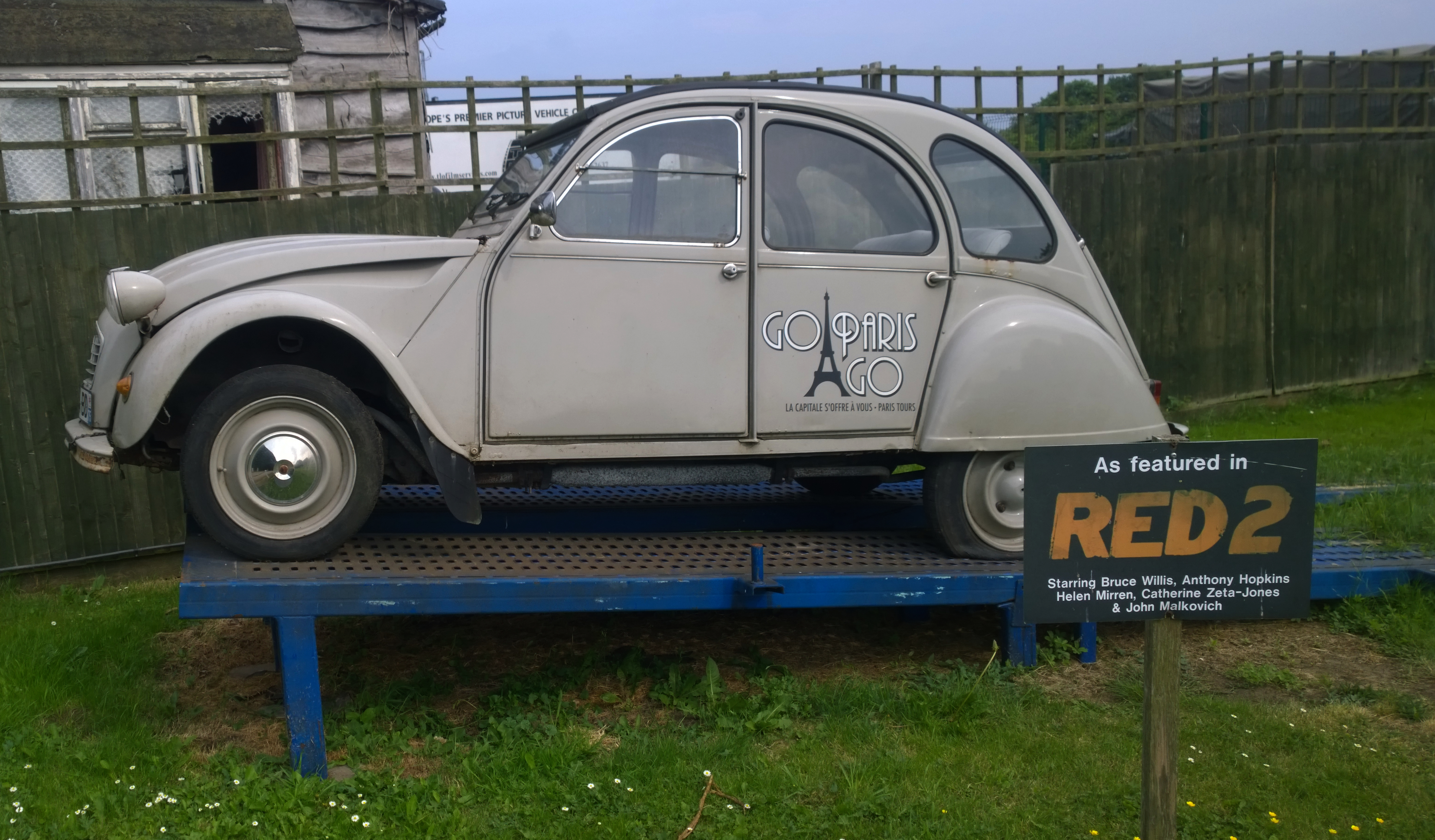
The Citroën 2CV driven by Mary-Louise Parker in the car chase.

In January 2011, Summit Entertainment rehired writers Jon and Erich Hoeber to write a second installment of Red due to the film's financial success, which even surpassed producer Lorenzo di Bonaventura's expectations. Helen Mirren stated in March 2011 that she was ready for Red 2. In October 2011, Summit announced that Red 2 would be released on August 2, 2013, and the film would "reunite the team of retired CIA operatives with some new friends as they use their 'old-school style' to take on new enemies in Europe." In February 2012, Dean Parisot, best known for directing Galaxy Quest and Fun With Dick and Jane, entered final negotiations to direct the sequel.

In May 2012, Catherine Zeta-Jones and Lee Byung-hun signed on to join the cast of Red 2. Also in May, it was reported that Anthony Hopkins was up to appear in the film as the villain, Edward Bailey, if a scheduling conflict could be worked out with Thor: The Dark World. In July 2012, Neal McDonough entered negotiations to join the cast of Red 2.

In August 2012, it was announced that Red 2 would film in Montreal beginning in September. The city was selected because of a 25 percent tax credit offered by the province of Quebec and because of its resemblance to European cities (the film's settings include London, Paris and Moscow). It was also reported that following the Montreal shoot, the production would film in London even though Montreal doubled for London in some scenes. In September 2012, David Thewlis joined the cast as a character called The Frog, an information dealer who got his name by poisoning the water supply at the Kremlin using a poisonous Amazonian frog. Principal photography began in late September in Montreal. In March 2013, Summit moved the film's release date from August 2, 2013, to July 19, 2013.

The childhood photo of Han Cho-bai (Lee Byung-hun) and his father that appears in the film are actually photos of Lee with his late father, who died in 2000. Lee's father was a fan of Hollywood films and dreamed of being an actor himself. When Lee shared this story with Dean Parisot, the director, he was so touched that he decided to include Lee's father at the end credits as one of the main cast, even though the photos appear only briefly in the film.

== Reception ==
=== Box office ===
Red 2 opened on July 19, 2013, in North America. In its opening weekend, the film grossed $18.5 million and finished in fifth place, which was lower than the $21.8 million its predecessor earned in October 2010. According to exit polling, 67% of the audience was over 35 and 52% was male. Red 2 grossed $53.3 million in North America and $94.8 million overseas for a total of $148.1 million worldwide.

=== Critical response ===
On Rotten Tomatoes, the film holds a rating of 44% based on 154 reviews, with an average rating of 5.5/10. The website's critical consensus reads, "While it's still hard to argue with its impeccable cast or the fun they often seem to be having, Red 2 replaces much of the goofy fun of its predecessor with empty, over-the-top bombast." On Metacritic, it has a weighted average score of 47 out of 100, based on reviews from 38 critics, indicating "mixed or average reviews". Audiences polled by CinemaScore gave the film an average grade of "B+" on an A+ to F scale.

Justin Chang of Variety called Red 2, "An obligatory sequel that can't quite recapture the sly, laid-back pleasures of its cheerfully ridiculous predecessor." Todd Gilchrist of The Wrap said, "...in a lackadaisical sequel no one asked for except perhaps his creditors, Bruce Willis seems unmotivated to smile at all, much less offer a series of emotions that constitute a believable or compelling performance." Justin Lowe of The Hollywood Reporter said, "Not that it isn’t entertaining, but the film's premise is certainly well past its 'use by' date, resulting in another passably palatable sequel distinguished by a lack of narrative and stylistic coherence that could potentially underpin a really viable franchise." Betsy Sharkey of Los Angeles Times said, "No doubt the hope was that Dean Parisot could do to the action genre what he did to the Star Trek universe in the spot-on satire of 1999's Galaxy Quest. He has, and he hasn't. Red 2 is much more of a mixed bag than it should have been." Nicolas Rapold of The New York Times said, "Cars careen, lazily written infiltration plans are executed, and the violence is plentiful and toothless."

=== Accolades ===
At the 40th People's Choice Awards, Red 2 received a nomination for Favorite Thriller Movie. Its teaser trailer was nominated for Best Comedy at the 2013 Golden Trailer Awards.

== Home media ==
Red 2 was released on DVD and Blu-ray on November 26, 2013, and on Ultra HD Blu-ray on September 5, 2017.

== Future ==
In May 2013, Lionsgate re-signed Jon Hoeber and Erich Hoeber to write a third installment. In 2015, NBC announced that they were developing a Red TV series with the Hoeber brothers, Lorenzo di Bonaventura, and Mark Vahradian. However, no further information about the development has been announced and with Bruce Willis' retirement due to health issues in 2022, a third film is unlikely.
