= Drift (2015 film) =

- Directed by: Karim Patwa
- Written by: Karim Patwa, Michael Proehl
- Produced by: Olivier Zobrist; Anne-Catherine Lang
- Starring: Max Hubacher; Sabine Timoteo
- Cinematography: Philipp Sichler
- Edited by: Stefan Kälin
- Music by: Jonas Cslovjescek
- Distributed by: Vinca Film GmbH
- Release date: January 2015
- Running time: 93 minutes
- Country: Switzerland
- Languages: English; Swiss German

Drift (German: Driften) is a 2015 Swiss drama film directed by Karim Patwa and written by Patwa and Michael Proehl. The film follows a young man trying to rebuild his life after prison. It won several awards, including Best Actress at the 2015 Swiss Film Award and three prizes at the 2015 Filmfestival Max Ophüls Preis, and was screened at international film festivals.

== Synopsis ==
After serving a prison sentence, Robert moves back to his parents’ home to start a new life and begins studying. He becomes involved with Alice, an older English teacher. As their relationship intensifies, feelings of guilt about his past begin to resurface.

== Cast ==
The cast includes:

- Max Hubacher as Robert Felder
- Sabine Timoteo as Alice Keller
- Jessy Moravec as Tatjana Rajic
- Susanne-Marie Wrage as Rahel Felder
- Adrian Furrer as Martin Felder

== Reception ==
=== Awards ===
The film won Best Actress at the 2015 Swiss Film Award. It also received the NDR Directing Award at Filmkunstfest Mecklenburg-Vorpommern and three prizes at the 2015 Filmfestival Max Ophüls Preis: the Fritz Raff Screenplay Award, the Film Prize of the Saarland Minister-President, and the Prize of the Ecumenical Jury.

=== Critical response ===
Filmdienst described Drift as a well-acted drama about an unconventional relationship. SRF described the film as a character study of two people linked by tragic circumstances, and praised the performances of Max Hubacher and Sabine Timoteo.

== Festival screenings ==
The film premiered in January 2015. Later that year, it was screened at festivals including the Filmfestival Max Ophüls Preis in Saarbrücken, the Solothurn Film Festival, the Cinequest San Jose Film Festival, Filmkunstfest Mecklenburg-Vorpommern, the Molodist Kyiv International Film Festival, and the Saas-Fee Filmfest.
