= Robert Schwentke =

German film director and screenwriter

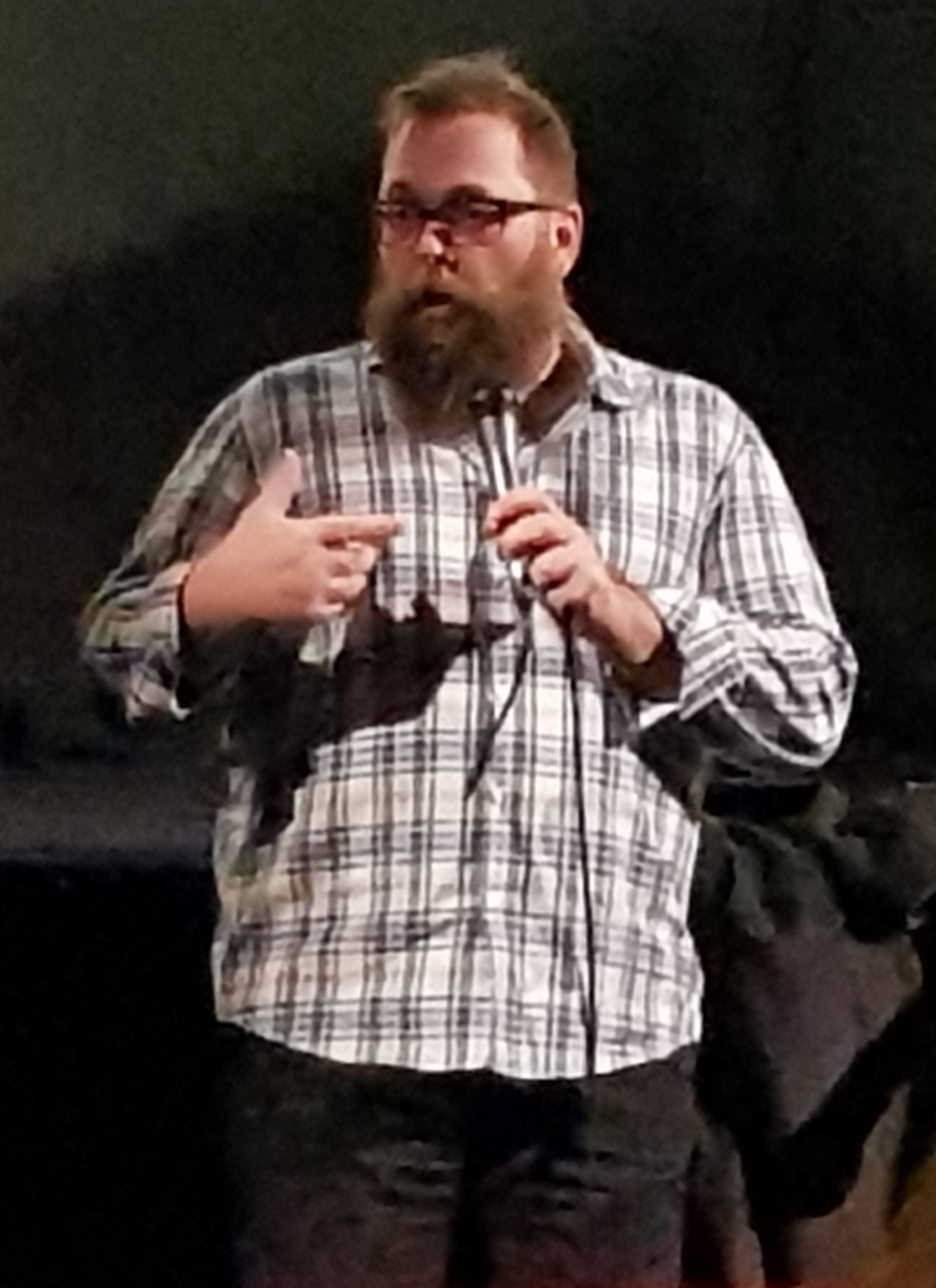
- Schwentke in 2018
- Born: 15 February 1968 (age 58); Stuttgart, West Germany
- Occupations: Film director; screenwriter
- Years active: 1993–present

Robert Schwentke (German: [ˈʃvɛŋkə]; born 15 February 1968) is a German film director and screenwriter. He is best known for directing Flightplan (2005), The Time Traveler's Wife (2009), Red (2010), The Divergent Series: Insurgent (2015), The Divergent Series: Allegiant (2016), and Snake Eyes (2021).

== Life and career ==
Schwentke was born in Stuttgart, Southwest Germany and has been passionate about films since an early age. He shot several 8-mm and 16-mm films during his childhood and youth. One of these was a 90-minute 8-mm film, which was shown in 1985 at the Württembergische Kunstverein Stuttgart as part of the exhibition 'Shock and Creation'.

Schwentke studied philosophy and comparative literature for four semesters at the Eberhard-Karls-University of Tübingen in Germany before deciding to change his field and place of study. He went on to study film production at Columbia College Hollywood, graduating cum laude with a Bachelor of Fine Arts.

During his studies in the U.S. he shot the short film Heaven! in 1992, featuring Hannes Jaenicke. The film follows a cat-and-mouse game between two greedy men over the loot from a heist.

He then studied directing at the American Film Institute in Los Angeles, earning a Master of Fine Arts as student of the Class of '93.

To help finance his studies in the U.S., Schwentke wrote for German television. He penned several Tatort episodes. His debut Bildersturm was nominated for the Grimme Award (German equivalent for Emmy Awards) in 1999. His second Tatort episode, Drei Affen, reached an audience of 10.37 million viewes in Germany and a rating of 31,06%, making it one of the most-watched episodes in recent decades.

After completing his studies in the U.S., Schwentke returned to Germany. "I always wanted to return with the know-how from over there," he later explained, "and then make European films." His first major feature film, Tattoo, follows two police officers hunting a ruthless serial killer obsessed with acquiring the coveted tattoos of a deceased Japanese artist. A year later, he directed the semi-autobiographical tragicomedy The Family Jewels (Eierdiebe) about a man being treated for testicular cancer, a disease he had been diagnosed with and survived himself in 1995.

His thriller Tattoo was screened at industry events and the Los Angeles International Film Festival (AFI FEST), attracting the attention of Disney Studios. Schwentke was hired to direct the thriller Flightplan, which became a major commercial success in the U.S., grossing $24,6 million on its opening weekend and staying at the top of the U.S. box office for two weeks. The film, starring Jodie Foster, follows a mother whose child mysteriously disappears during a transatlantic flight from Berlin to New York.

In 2007, he was set to direct the thriller Runaway Train, about a railway worker trying to stop an unmanned, toxic-gas-laden train from destroying a city. However, the project was later realised by Tony Scott in 2010 under the title Unstoppable. Schwentke also considered directing The Deep Blue Goodbye, based in John D. MacDonald's novel about a modern Robin Hood who demands hefty payments for his services. He ultimately declined both projects in order to direct 2009's The Time Traveler's Wife, based on the best-selling novel, starring Eric Bana and Rachel McAdams. That same year, Schwentke directed the pilot episode of Fox's Lie to Me.

In 2008, Summit Entertainment optioned Red, the 2003 graphic novel thriller by writer Warren Ellis and artist Cully Hamner, as a feature film. Schwentke directed the film, Red, from a script by Whiteout screenwriters Erich and Jon Hoeber, and the adaptation was produced by Lorenzo di Bonaventura and Mark Vahradian of Transformers. Principal photography began in January 2010 in Toronto and Louisiana with stars Bruce Willis and Morgan Freeman. The star-studded mix of action and comedy was a box office hit and earned a Golden Globe nomination for Best Motion Picture - Musical or Comedy.

Schwentke directed the action-comedy crime film R.I.P.D., based on the comic book Rest in Peace Department by Peter M. Lenkov. The film starred Ryan Reynolds as Nick Walker and Jeff Bridges as Roycephus Pulsipher. R.I.P.D. was released on 19 July 2013 in the United States by Universal Pictures. While the supernatural cop comedy received negative reviews and disappointed at the box office, it later gained a cult following and found success on streaming platforms, topping Netflix's Top 10 List in 2023.

In 2015, Schwentke directed The Divergent Series: Insurgent, the sequel to Divergent, which was released on 20 March 2015. He also directed Part 1 of Allegiant, the two-part finale to the series, with a script by Noah Oppenheim.

In 2016, Schwentke shot The Captain (Der Hauptmann) in Poland and Germany, starring Max Hubacher. The bitingly dark and blackly comedic war drama, based on the true confidence trick of Wehrmacht soldier Willi Herold, premiered at the Toronto International Film Festival (TIFF) to critical acclaim. It was later screened at the San Sebastián Film Festival in September 2017 and released in Germany in March 2018. The film won multiple awards, including the FIPRESCI Prize at the Vilnius International Film Festival, and was nominated for five categories at the 2018 German Film Awards.

Schwentke returned to Hollywood in 2019 to direct the G.I. Joe spin-off film centered around Snake Eyes, a film that allowed him to embrace his love for Japanese cinema. Filming took place in Tokyo, Osaka and British Columbia. Originally scheduled for release in October 2020, the film, which stars Henry Golding, was postponed to 2021 due to the COVID-19 pandemic.

Schwentke has deliberately worked across multiple different genres from the beginning of his career. His distinctive balancing act between Hollywood mainstream and auteur movies continued in 2021 when he shot Seneca - On the Creation of Earthquakes (Seneca - Oder: Über die Geburt von Erdbeben) in the Moroccan desert. John Malkovich stars as the Roman philosopher Seneca, who is forced to commit suicide by his former student Emperor Nero. The film, a biting satire on the elites' inability to oppose tyranny, premiered at the Berlin International Film Festival (Berlinale) on February 20, 2023 and gained critical acclaim. The FAZ writes: "'Seneca' will go down in film history not as a portent but as one of the most successful exercises in high camp since Alejandro Jodorowsky or Werner Herzog. [...] To love, in this case, is the power of cinema - a cinema that fully embraces myth and stands as the highest pop-cultural form on this side of the grand words that Schwentke so magnificently banishes to the desert." The term high camp here refers to the aesthetic style and sensibility that regard something as appealing because of its bad taste and ironic value. The essence of camp is its love of the unnatural: of artifice and exaggeration.

Schwentke's films often explore extreme experiences and characters in exceptional situations. His series Helgoland 513, produced exclusively for Sky Germany in 2023, follows the last survivors of an apocalypse. He served as show runner, head writer, executive producer, and director for all episodes. Filming took place in Berlin, Hamburg and the North Sea islands of Sylt and Amrum. The series premiered on Sky and NOW on March 15, 2024.

Immediately afterward, Schwentke began working on the action thriller Control, for which he also wrote the screenplay. Based on the podcast Shipworm by Zack Akers and Skip Bronkie, the film follows a doctor who wakes up with a mysterious voice in his head, forcing him to obey its commands. Starring James McAvoy alongside Julianne Moore, Nick Mohammed, and Jenna Coleman, the film is expected to be released in 2025.

== Filmography ==
Key
†	Denotes films that have not yet been released

Film

Year	Title	Director	Writer
1993	Heaven!	Yes	Yes
2002	Tattoo	Yes	Yes
2003	Eierdiebe	Yes	Yes
2005	Flightplan	Yes	No
2009	The Time Traveler's Wife	Yes	No
2010	Red	Yes	No
2013	R.I.P.D.	Yes	No
2015	The Divergent Series: Insurgent	Yes	No
2016	The Divergent Series: Allegiant	Yes	No
2017	The Captain	Yes	Yes
2021	Snake Eyes	Yes	No
2023	Seneca – On the Creation of Earthquakes	Yes	Yes
TBA	Control †	Yes	Yes

Television

Year	Title	Director	Writer	Notes
1998–2001	Tatort	No	Yes	Episodes "Bildersturm", "Drei Affen" and "Mördergrube"
2009	Lie to Me	Yes	No	Episode "Pilot"
2024	Helgoland 513	Yes	Yes	8 episodes, Also creator

== Awards & Nominations (Selection) ==
Sweden Fantastic Film Festival

- 2002: Winner, Grand Prize of European Fantasy Film in Silver - Special Mention for Tattoo

New Faces Awards Germany

- 2002: Nominated, New Faces Award: Director for Tattoo

Fantasporto

- 2003: Winner, International Fantasy Film Award - Special Mention for Tattoo
- 2003: Nominated, International Fantasy Film Award for Tattoo

Deep Ellum Film Festival

- 2003: Winner, Dallas/Deep Ellum Award: Dramatic Competition for The Family Jewels
- 2003: Winner, Festival Prize: Best Deep Ellum/Dallas - Feature for The Family Jewels

Saturn Awards

- 2006: Nominated, Best Action Adventure Film for Flightplan
- 2010: Nominated, Best Fantasy Film for The Time Traveler's Wife

National Movie Awards

- 2010: Winner, Breakthrough Film for The Time Traveler's Wife

Golden Globes

- 2011: Nominated, Best Motion Picture - Musical or Comedy for R.E.D.

Les Arcs European Film Festival

- 2017: Winner, Young Jury Prize for The Captain
- 2017: Winner, Press Prize - Special Mention for The Captain
- 2017: Winner, 20 Minutes of Audacity Prize for The Captain

Traverse City Film Festival

- 2018: Winner, Stanley Kubrick Award for Bold & Innovative Filmmaking for The Captain

BIFEST - Bari International Film Festival

- 2018: Winner, International Competition Award for Best Director for The Captain

Vilnius International Film Festival

- 2018: The International Critics Prize for Best Film for The Captain
- 2018: FIPRESCI Prize for The Captain

German Film Awards

- 2018: Nominated, Outstanding Feature Film for The Captain

Palic Film Festival

- 2023: Nominated, Golden Tower: Best Film for Seneca

Festival de Télévision de Monte-Carlo

- 2024: Winner, Golden Nymph Audience Award for Helgoland 513

== See also ==
- Cinema of Germany
