= Jule Böwe =

German actress

- Born: Kathrin Cammann; 1969 (age 56–57); Rostock, East Germany
- Occupation: Actress
- Years active: 1999–present

Jule Böwe (born Kathrin Cammann, 1969) is a German actress. She has appeared in more than thirty films since 1999.

== Biography ==
Jule Böwe, born as the child of a psychiatrist and neurologist couple, took her first name Jule in a student dormitory after the statement of a roommate. While still in the GDR, she first trained as an occupational therapist and worked in this profession until 1992 in the "home for the injured" in Berlin-Lichtenberg and in the special hospital in Berlin-Charlottenburg. Already during her training in Wismar she played in a student theater group. She applied to some acting schools, but failed all entrance exams.

== Selected filmography ==
Year	Title	Role	Notes
2003	Alltag	Franka Bischoff	
2005	Katze im Sack		
2006	Black Sheep		
2009	Gravity	Sonja	
2010	The Silence		
2012	Russian Disco	Jule	
2022	The Ordinaries	Elisa Feinmann	
2022	Grand Jeté	Doris	
