= Green Lantern: Mosaic =

1992–93 DC Comics series

- Green Lantern: Mosaic #1, art by Brian Stelfreeze.

Publication information
- Publisher: DC Comics
- Format: Ongoing series
- Publication date: June 1992 – November 1993
- No. of issues: 18
- Main character: John Stewart

Creative team
- Created by: Gerard Jones; Cully Hamner
- Written by: Gerard Jones; Joseph Filice
- Artist(s): Cully Hamner; Luke McDonnell; Jim Balent; Mitch Byrd

Green Lantern: Mosaic was an American comic book series published by DC Comics starring the fictional character superhero (John Stewart), a member of the intergalactic police force, the Green Lantern Corps. The series had its origin in a story arc of the same name in Green Lantern (vol. 3) #14–17, and was set up in earlier issues since that series' launch in 1990.

The ongoing series began in June of 1992 and ended in November of 1993, lasting 18 issues. It was written by Gerard Jones and primarily drawn by Cully Hamner.

== Publication history ==
In an unusual move, and although sales of the book were strong, Green Lantern: Mosaic was cancelled early into its run. In an interview, Cully Hamner revealed the reasons behind the cancellation:

(A)s I was told at the time, it didn't fit with DC editorial vision (whatever that means). Sales didn't matter, fan support didn't matter; the first issue sold about 210,000 copies and my last issue sold about 70,000, so there was plenty of support for the book. It was marked for cancellation when issue #5 came out, and they allowed Gerry Jones a year to wrap it up, but there was no doubt that it was being cancelled because somebody upstairs just didn't care for it. So, I had a feeling after a while of creatively being against a brick wall, and got out before the end. You pay your money, you takes your chances. That's the biz.

== Plot synopsis ==
Green Lantern Hal Jordan, investigating the disappearance of Evergreen City on Earth, discovers that Appa Ali Apsa, the lone remaining Guardian of the Universe left behind after his brothers left the main universe, has been driven insane by loneliness. For companionship, Apsa has been uprooting cities from all the worlds he has visited and transporting them to the planet Oa, creating a patchwork known as the Mosaic World. John Stewart, captured by Apsa, summons Jordan through their power rings and, together with Guy Gardner and the newly returned Guardians, defeat Apsa.

Believing that Apsa's experiment should be allowed to progress to its conclusion, the Guardians decide to maintain Mosaic World rather than return the inhabitants to their homeworlds. Accordingly, the Guardians assign Stewart to act as the Green Lantern of the Mosaic World. Stewart is charged with maintaining the peace among the different communities as well as constructing a cohesive society from the disparate races.

Initially distrustful of each other, the various communities sometimes came to battle, even leading to fatalities. Some of the cities have life-forms hostile to each other or to all other life. Stewart also deals with less fatal problems, such as overpopulation and the fact one of the cities was inhabited by only two people. Assisting Stewart in his efforts are some of the citizens of Evergreen City, including several youngsters whose parents are suffering severe mental problems due to their unique situation. Stewart gives these children less-powerful rings and they assist in future conflicts. Stewart also tries to build roads between the cities. This, along with his other efforts, are hampered by visions of 'the red', which was revealed to be manifestations of Sinestro's spirit within Stewart's ring. During one of these vision flares, the Green Lantern Ch'p is struck and killed by a truck. Through Stewart's efforts, the cities of Mosaic World are eventually forged into a cohesive society. In return for his success, the Guardians make Stewart the first mortal Guardian.

Hal Jordan, possessed by Parallax, destroys the Central Power Battery and kills all but one of the Guardians of the Universe, leaving Oa and Mosaic World barren. Later, it is revealed that Mosaic World was evacuated by a multi-species coalition in anticipation of the battle between Jordan and the Guardians. The survivors of the experiments are returned to their homeworlds.

Mosaic's abandoned remains were destroyed when Oa was obliterated by Kyle Rayner during a battle with Parallax.
