= Karim Patwa =

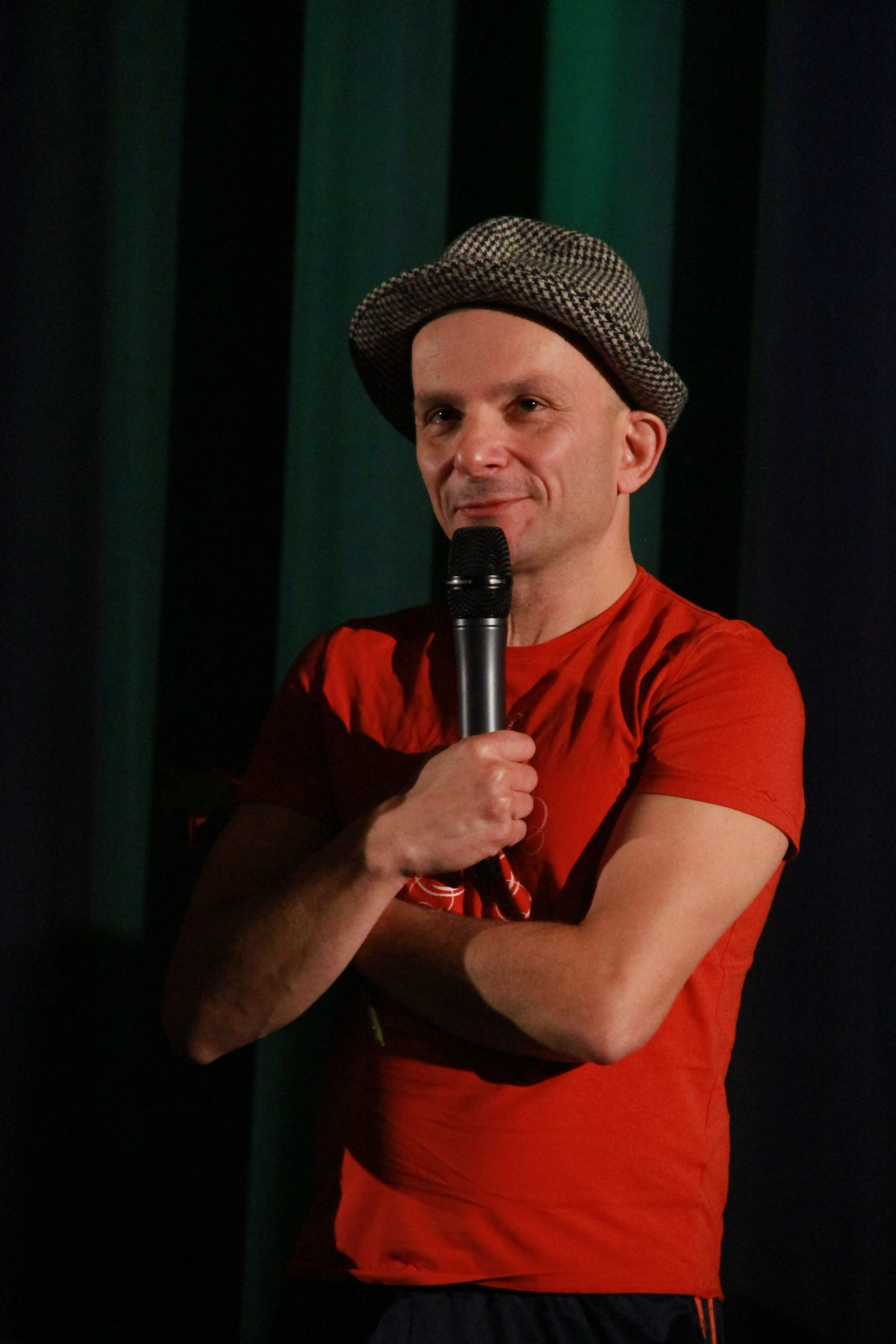
- Karim Patwa at the Max Ophüls Film Festival 2015
- Born: Karim Patwa; August 13, 1968 (age 57); London, England
- Education: Institute of Applied Arts, Schule für Gestaltung
- Known for: Film
- Notable work: Drift

Karim Patwa (born August 13, 1968) is a Swiss-English film director and screenwriter. He gained international attention especially through his film Drift, which won three prizes at the Max Ophüls Festival 2015 and the NDR-directing prize, and was also nominated for the Swiss Film Award 2015.

== Life and career ==
Karim Patwa grew up in Orpund. After school, he did an apprenticeship as an electrical mechanic. At the same time, he attended evening classes in photography at the Biel School of Design. Then, he worked as a press photographer at the Bieler Tagblatt between 1989 and 1991. From 1992 to 1996, Karim Patwa studied at the Lucerne School of Art and Design and graduated with the diploma of the faculty of video. Since then, he has worked as a freelance film director and screenwriter. His creations include music videos, commercials and short films.

== Filmography ==
=== Feature Film ===
- 2015: Drift

=== Video ===
- 2004: Karim Patwa's Spaceship

=== Shorts ===
- 1996: ON-OFF
- 1997: Unglaublich aber war
- 1999: Der AV-Werkstattsupporter
- 2002: Heartcore
- 2007: High Above Ground
- 2007: Die Chronomanen
- 2008: Brüder

=== Music Videos ===
- ADO – All tomorrows birthday partys
- Züri West – One more blues
- Salmonella Q – Kill the DJ
