= Red (2010 film) =

Film directed by Robert Schwentke

- Theatrical release poster
- Directed by: Robert Schwentke
- Screenplay by: Jon Hoeber; Erich Hoeber
- Based on: Red by: Warren Ellis; Cully Hamner
- Produced by: Lorenzo di Bonaventura; Mark Vahradian
- Starring: Bruce Willis; Morgan Freeman; John Malkovich; Helen Mirren; Karl Urban; Mary-Louise Parker; Brian Cox; Julian McMahon; Richard Dreyfuss
- Cinematography: Florian Ballhaus
- Edited by: Thom Noble
- Music by: Christophe Beck
- Production company: Di Bonaventura Pictures
- Distributed by: Summit Entertainment
- Release dates: September 29, 2010 (Fantastic Fest); October 15, 2010 (United States)
- Running time: 111 minutes
- Country: United States
- Language: English
- Budget: $58–60 million
- Box office: $199 million

Red is a 2010 American action comedy film written by Jon and Erich Hoeber, and directed by Robert Schwentke. It is based on the comic book series by Warren Ellis and Cully Hamner. The film stars Bruce Willis, Morgan Freeman, John Malkovich, Helen Mirren, Karl Urban, Mary-Louise Parker, Brian Cox, Julian McMahon and Richard Dreyfuss. The plot involves Frank Moses, a former black-ops agent who reunites with his old team to capture an assassin who has vowed to kill him. Red premiered at the Fantastic Fest on September 29, 2010, and was released in the United States on October 15, by Summit Entertainment. The film received generally positive reviews from critics and was nominated for Best Motion Picture – Musical or Comedy at the 68th Golden Globe Awards. A sequel, Red 2, was released in 2013.

== Plot ==
Former CIA black ops agent Frank Moses lives in the suburbs and frequently tears up his pension checks in order to call center employee Sarah Ross, with whom he has fallen in love over the phone. One day, an assassination squad attacks Frank at his home, but he kills the entire group. Knowing that his phone conversations with Sarah have been monitored and fearing for her safety, Frank travels to Missouri to rescue her, kidnapping her when she refuses to come with him. Meanwhile, CIA agent William Cooper is tasked by his supervisor Cynthia Wilkes to kill Frank.

In New Orleans, Frank ties up Sarah in a motel room while he visits his former mentor Joe at a retirement home for help identifying the squad. Joe's intel reveals that the same squad murdered a New York Times reporter recently. Sarah gets loose and calls 9-1-1, alerting Cooper to her location. Frank saves her from one of Cooper's agents, and the pair narrowly avoid Cooper. In New York, they speak with the reporter's mother and find a list of names the reporter was investigating (including Frank's), almost all of whom recently died. Meanwhile, Joe's room is infiltrated by a hitman, leaving Frank devastated.

Frank and Sarah track down retired agent Marvin Boggs in Florida, whose name is on the list. He finds that all the names on the list were part of a series of killings in Guatemala in 1981 that they were involved in. The three track down pilot Gabriel Singer, who flew the mission, but he is killed by a sniper before he can give any valuable information. Frank secures the help of retired FSB agent Ivan Simanov in exchange for a favor, and with Sarah infiltrates the Secure Records Vault at the CIA's headquarters in Virginia to obtain the Guatemala file. Frank runs into Cooper in his office and they fight; he dislocates Cooper's shoulder, and Cooper shoots and wounds Frank. Frank and Sarah are picked up by Marvin and Joe (who survived the assassination attempt). The four seek help from retired British assassin Victoria Winslow, who joins them as they decide to meet Alexander Dunning, an arms dealer who is the only other name on the list still alive.

Joe, Frank, and Marvin interrogate Dunning at his home, where he reveals that the killings were ordered by the Vice President of the US, Robert Stanton, in order to cover up Stanton's mass killing of innocent villagers in Guatemala. Meanwhile, Cooper receives a tip that leads him to Dunning's mansion. Joe sacrifices his life to help Frank and Marvin escape. The two and Victoria are extracted by Ivan, but Sarah is captured by Cooper's men. Finding the Guatemala file Frank left for him at his house, Cooper realizes that he is being used in the coverup and has himself assigned to Stanton's security detail.

The remaining group kidnaps Stanton with the help of Ivan. Frank calls Cooper and arranges to trade Stanton for Sarah. Cooper arrives alone and Cynthia brings Sarah, as well as Dunning, who shoots Stanton and reveals himself and Cynthia to be behind the assassinations. He orders Cooper to detain Frank, offering to make him CIA Director if he kills Frank and Sarah. Cooper instead kills Cynthia. Marvin and Victoria kill Dunning's bodyguards, and Frank and Marvin kill Dunning. Cooper then lets everyone leave, staying behind to clean up after them.

The group leaves, and Ivan cashes in his favor from Frank; a problem needs to be resolved in Moldova. Sarah happily insists that she join Frank on the mission. Frank and Marvin are then shown fleeing Moldovan troops with a stolen nuclear device.

== Cast ==
- Bruce Willis as Francis "Frank" Moses, a CIA black ops agent forced into retirement and tagged R.E.D. (Retired, Extremely Dangerous)
- Morgan Freeman as Joe Matheson, Frank's mentor at the CIA
- John Malkovich as Marvin Boggs, a retired CIA agent who was given LSD daily for years as part of illegal agency experiments
- Helen Mirren as Victoria "Vicky" Winslow, a retired MI6 assassin who still takes contracts on the side
- Karl Urban as William Cooper, a CIA black ops agent tasked with killing Frank
- Mary-Louise Parker as Sarah Ross, a call center employee and Frank's love interest
- Rebecca Pidgeon as Cynthia Wilkes, Cooper's corrupt CIA supervisor
- Brian Cox as Ivan Simanov, a retired FSB agent who works for the Russian embassy
- Richard Dreyfuss as Alexander Dunning, an arms trafficker with CIA connections
- Julian McMahon as Vice President Robert Stanton
- Ernest Borgnine as Henry Britton, CIA records keeper
- James Remar as Gabriel Singer, a retired Marine helicopter pilot who participated in the Guatemala coverup
- Jaqueline Fleming as Marna, a supervisor at Joe's retirement home
- Audrey Wasilewski as a CIA assassin disguised as a businesswoman
- Greg Bryk as Firefighter

== Production ==
Gregory Noveck, a representative of DC Comics working in Hollywood to get their titles made into films, wanted the comic developed, but Warner Bros. was not interested. The creators of the comic exercised their right to go elsewhere, but this required approval from all divisions of Warner Bros., including television, before it could be approved. After several years, in 2008, Noveck was allowed to take the project to Mark Vahradian at Di Bonaventura Productions. Unusually, this made it the first film from DC not produced by Warner Bros., after the purchase.

In June 2008, Summit Entertainment announced plans to adapt Warren Ellis and Cully Hamner's Red. Red was adapted for the big screen by brothers Erich and Jon Hoeber, who also wrote the adaptations of Whiteout and Alice. The project was produced by Lorenzo di Bonaventura (GI Joe, Transformers).

By April 2009, Bruce Willis was reportedly in discussions with Summit to take the starring role of Frank Moses. It was reported in July 2009 that Morgan Freeman was in talks to co-star alongside Willis in the film. Also in July 2009, Robert Schwentke, the director of The Time Traveler's Wife and Flightplan, was in negotiations to direct Red. In August 2009, Schwentke confirmed to MTV News that he was on board. He stated that he loved the script, but differences existed between the comic and the movie, stating; "It's very funny, which the comic book isn't ... It's not as violent as the comic book," and "The script that I've read is obviously different from the comic, because I don't think the comic gives you enough for a two-hour movie."

In November 2009, Helen Mirren was reported to be engaged to work alongside Freeman and Willis in the film. Also in November 2009, John C. Reilly and Mary-Louise Parker were in negotiations to join the cast. Reilly would play a retired CIA agent who is paranoid that everyone is out to kill him. Parker would play the romantic interest, a federal pension worker who becomes embroiled in the Willis character's struggle to stay alive. In the same month, Julian McMahon, Ernest Borgnine, Richard Dreyfuss, and Brian Cox entered negotiations to join the cast.

In December 2009, creator Warren Ellis stated on his mailing list: "Read the RED script. Not bad. Not the book, but not bad. Funny. Especially when you know the casting. Very tight piece of work. Talked to the producers last week. They're all kind of giddy over the casting coups. Who wouldn't want to see Helen Mirren with a sniper rifle?" Also in December 2009 Summit Entertainment announced a release date of October 22, 2010. The same month, James Remar was cast in an unspecified role, in addition to Karl Urban as "Cooper". In January 2010, reportedly John Malkovich had signed to star opposite Bruce Willis, replacing John C. Reilly, who exited the role in late December.

Principal photography began on January 18, 2010, in Toronto, Canada. Red was shot in and around the Toronto metropolitan area for nine weeks before moving on to the road and ending in New Orleans in late March for the final two weeks of principal photography. Filming in the French Quarter of New Orleans commenced in March 2010. Additional photography was shot for a post-credits scene in Louisiana in August 2010.

== Release ==
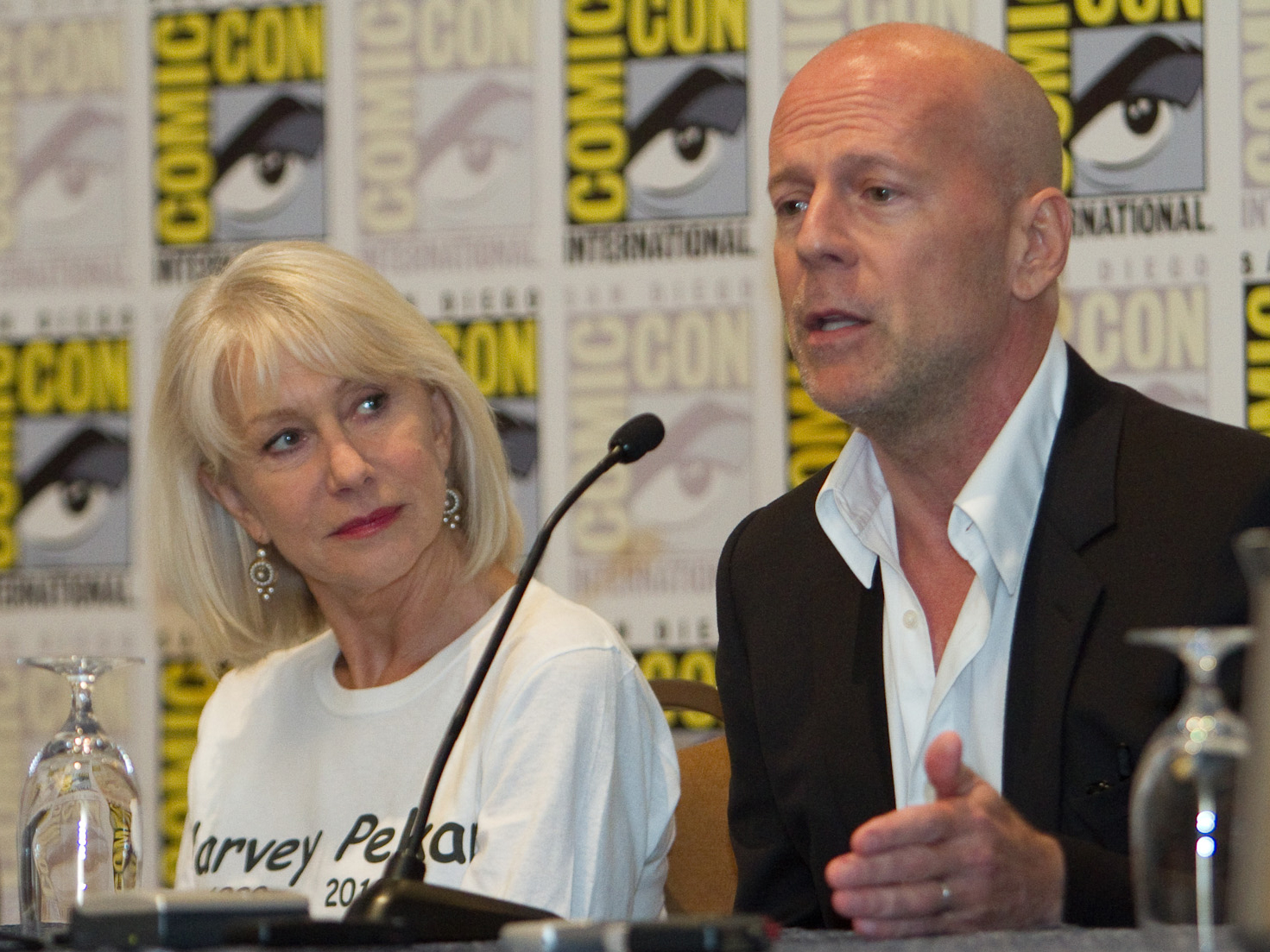
Mirren and Willis at a panel for the film at San Diego Comic-Con in July 2010

The film premiered at Grauman's Chinese Theatre in Hollywood on October 11, 2010. Red was released on Blu-ray and DVD on January 25, 2011. The film was released by Summit Entertainment in the US and Entertainment One in the UK. Lionsgate Home Entertainment later released it on Ultra HD Blu-ray on September 5, 2017.

== Reception ==
=== Box office ===
On its opening weekend, Red earned an estimated $22.5 million on around 4,100 screens at 3,255 locations, coming in second behind Jackass 3-D. The film closed in theaters on February 3, 2011, grossing $90 million in the United States, and $108.6 million in foreign markets, for a worldwide gross of $199 million.

=== Critical response ===
On Rotten Tomatoes the film holds an approval rating of 72% based on 213 reviews, with an average rating of 6.40/10. The site's critics consensus reads, "It may not be the killer thrill ride you'd expect from an action movie with a cast of this caliber, but Red still thoroughly outshines most of its big-budget counterparts with its wit and style." Metacritic gave the film a weighted average score of 60 out of 100 based 38 critics, indicating "mixed or average reviews". Audiences polled by CinemaScore gave the film an average grade of "A−" on an A+ to F scale.

Justin Chang of Variety stated Red is "An amusing, light-footed caper about a team of aging CIA veterans rudely forced out of retirement". John DeFore of The Hollywood Reporter stated "Although tailor-made for genre fans, it benefits from flavors of humor and romance that keep its appeal from being fanboy-only".

Roger Ebert gave the film two stars out of four, stating that it is "neither a good movie nor a bad one. It features actors that we like doing things we wish were more interesting." A. O. Scott of The New York Times said, "It is possible to have a good time at Red, but it is not a very good movie. It doesn't really try to be, and given the present state of the Hollywood economy, this may be a wise choice". Kenneth Turan of the Los Angeles Times said, "It's not that it doesn't have effective moments, it's that it doesn't have as many as it thinks it does. The film's inescapable air of glib self-satisfaction is not only largely unearned, it's downright irritating".

=== Accolades ===
Year	Award	Category	Recipient	Result
2010	IGN Summer Movie Award	Best Comic Book Adaptation	Red	Nominated
2010	Satellite Award	Best Motion Picture, Comedy or Musical	Red	Nominated
2010	Satellite Award	Best Actress in a Motion Picture, Comedy or Musical	Mary-Louise Parker	Nominated
2010	Satellite Award	Best Actor in a Motion Picture, Comedy or Musical	John Malkovich	Nominated
2011	Golden Globe Award	Best Motion Picture - Musical or Comedy	Red	Nominated
2011	Movies for Grownups Award	Breakthrough Achievement	Helen Mirren	Won
2011	Movies for Grownups Award	Best Comedy	Red	Nominated
2011	EDA Female Focus Award	Actress Defying Age and Ageism	Helen Mirren	Won
2011	EDA Female Focus Award	Best Female Action Star	Helen Mirren	Nominated
2011	EDA Female Focus Award	Outstanding Achievement by a Woman in the Film Industry	Helen Mirren	Nominated
2011	EDA Female Focus Award	Women's Image Award	Helen Mirren	Nominated
2011	Artios Award	Outstanding Achievement in Casting - Big Budget Feature - Comedy	Deborah Aquila; Tricia Wood; Craig Fincannon; Lisa Mae Fincannon; Robin D. Cook	Won
2011	Saturn Award	Best Action or Adventure Film	Red	Nominated
2011	Saturn Award	Best Supporting Actor	John Malkovich	Nominated
2011	Saturn Award	Best Supporting Actress	Helen Mirren	Nominated
2011	Critics' Choice Award	Best Action Movie	Red	Nominated
2011	NAACP Image Award	Outstanding Actor in a Motion Picture	Morgan Freeman	Nominated
2011	Scream Award	Best Thriller	Red	Nominated
2011	Scream Award	Best Supporting Actress	Helen Mirren	Nominated
2011	Scream Award	Best Ensemble	Cast of Red	Nominated
2011	Scream Award	Fight Scene of the Year	Red	Nominated

== Sequel ==
The film's financial success surpassed producer Lorenzo di Bonaventura's expectations. In October 2011, Summit Entertainment officially announced that Red 2 would be released on August 2, 2013, with Jon and Erich Hoeber rehired to write the screenplay. In March 2013, the film's release date was moved from August 2, 2013 to July 19, 2013. The sequel fared worse than its predecessor both critically and financially. The film received mixed reviews from critics and grossed $148.1 million worldwide.
