= Emslandlager =

WWII prison camps in Lower Saxony, Germany

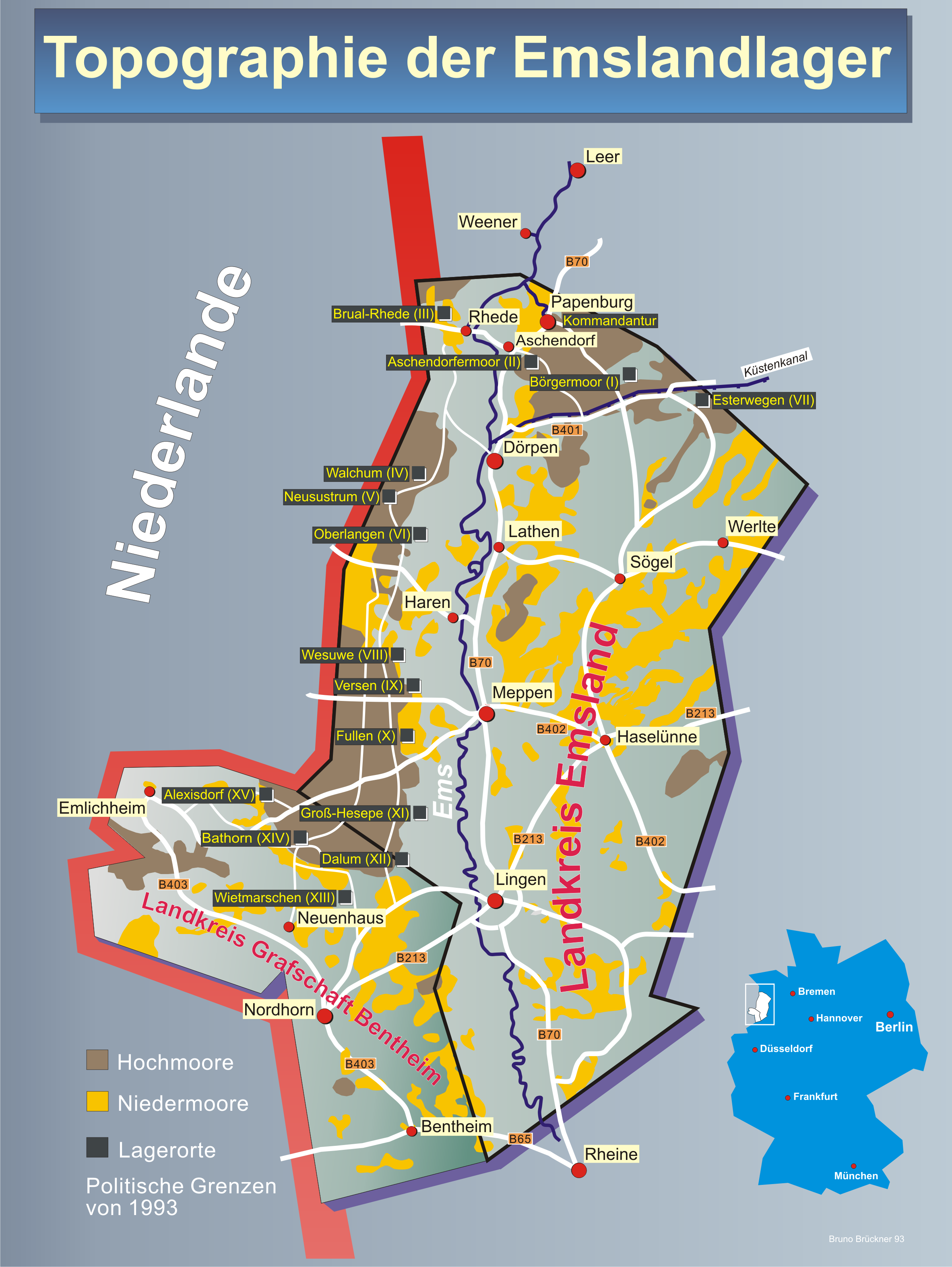
Location of Emslandlager

Emslandlager ("Emsland camps") were a series of 15 moorland labor, punitive and POWs-camps, active from 1933 to 1945 and located in the districts of Emsland and Bentheim, Lower Saxony, Germany. The central administration was set in Papenburg. From 1985 to 2011, the history of these camps was memorialized in the Dokumentations- und Informationszentrum (DIZ) Emslandlager in Papenburg. As of November 2011, this role has been taken over by the Gedenkstätte Esterwegen (Esterwegen Memorial).

In Emslandlager VII camp, seven Belgian Freemasons and resistance fighters founded Liberté chérie in 1943, one of the very few Masonic lodges established within a Nazi concentration camp.

== Börgermoor concentration camp ==
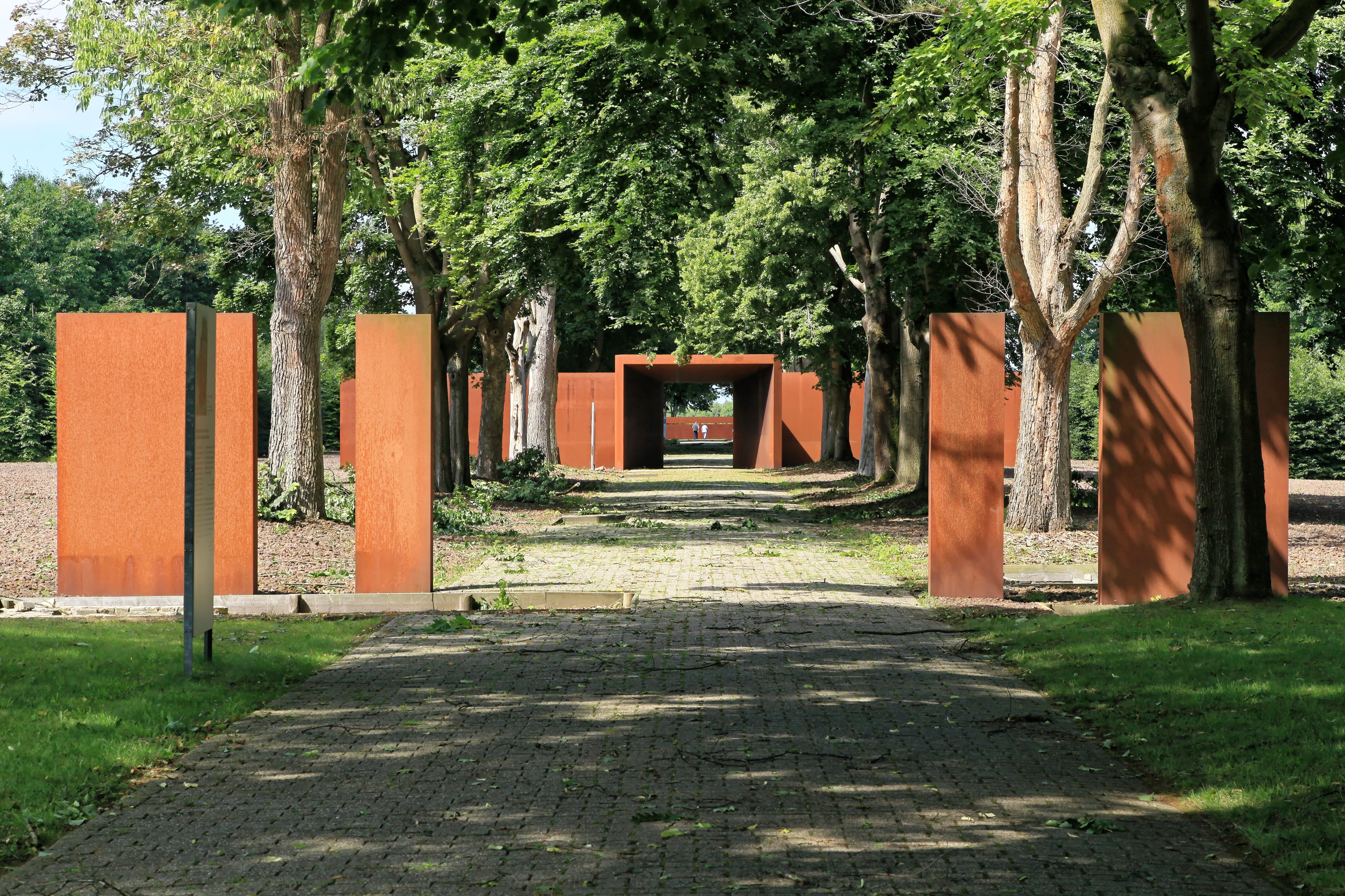
Gedenkstätte Esterwegen

The first and one of the most important of these camps was the Börgermoor concentration camp, situated near the current municipality of Surwold, in Lower Saxony. In June 1933 the first 1000 German political opponents to be held in protective custody (Schutzhaft) arrived at the site of the camp, which they built from scratch, as well as the Esterwegen concentration camp. In 1934 the camp became a punitive one, under the supervision of the Reich Ministry of Justice, and criminals, homosexuals and Jehovah's Witnesses arrived in large numbers, until all the political inmates were moved to the Emslandlager Aschendorfermoor camp in 1937. Starting in 1940, the camp housed increasing numbers of German military personnel held in custody for desertion or unauthorized absence from their military unit. By 1942 they accounted for 50% of the prisoners.

The Börgermoor concentration camp was also the birthplace of one of the best known protest songs, the "Peat Bog Soldiers".

== Aschendorfermoor camp massacre ==
In April 1945, during the chaotic final weeks of World War II, the Emslandlager network—specifically Camp II, Aschendorfermoor—became the site of a brutal mass murder orchestrated by a 19-year-old Luftwaffe’s Fallschirmjager private named Willi Herold.

=== Background and the impostor ===
As Allied forces advanced into northern Germany early in April 1945, around 2,500 to 3,000 evacuated prisoners from various Emsland subcamps were consolidated at Aschendorfermoor. On 11 April 1945, Herold, who had separated from his unit, arrived at the camp wearing a discarded Luftwaffe captain's uniform he had found. Claiming to operate under a forged, absolute command directly authorized by Adolf Hitler, Herold overthrew the camp's administrative authority and established a rogue court-martial.

=== The execution of prisoners ===
Between 12 April and 19 April 1945, Herold and an ad-hoc group of local troops, Hitler Youth members, and loyal guards systematically executed at least 172 prisoners at the camp. The victims were primarily German military convicts, political prisoners, and individuals who had attempted to escape during the chaotic war's end.

The massacre at the camp ended on 19 April when a British Royal Air Force bombing raid destroyed the camp administration buildings. Herold subsequently organized the remaining survivors and guards into a mobile unit, executing several more civilians and prisoners as they moved north toward East Frisia.

=== Aftermath and tribunal ===
Herold was captured by British forces in May 1945. On 1 February 1946, British military authorities forced Herold and 50 other German inmates to exhume the mass graves at the former penal camp, recovering a total of 195 bodies—comprising 172 massacre victims and 23 killed in the subsequent air raid.

In August 1946, Herold and twelve co-defendants were tried by a British military tribunal in Oldenburg, overseen by Colonel Herbert Bown. Herold and six other defendants were convicted of war crimes and sentenced to death. They were executed by guillotining at Wolfenbüttel prison on 14 November 1946. Today, the victims are memorialized at the Aschendorfermoor War Cemetery, which is maintained as a perpetual resting place under German federal law. The massacre is depicted in the 2017 historical drama film The Captain (German: Der Hauptmann).

== After WWII ==
Emslandlager was also the site of a post World War II British sector displaced person camp near Emsland in Lower Saxony in Germany.

Maczków was the name of the central town of a Polish military enclave in Emsland, Germany, existing from 1945–1947, later renamed back to Haren. Maczków became a totally Polish town with a Polish mayor, a Polish school, a Polish fire brigade and a Polish rectory. The latter registered 289 weddings and 101 funerals. 479 Poles have birth certificates showing Maczków as place of birth. The town was returned to the original inhabitants when the Polish army unit returned to England in June 1947, and the Polish inhabitants of the town were either repatriated to Poland or moved to Great Britain.

== See also ==
- Forced labour under German Nazi rule
