= David Scheller =

German actor (born 1972)

- Born: October 12, 1972 (age 52); Munich, Germany
- Occupation: actor
- Years active: 1992–present

David Scheller (born October 12, 1972) is a German actor.

Since the early 1990s he appeared in many German TV- and film productions and also participated in a few international movies like Fay Grim or Extreme Ops. In series and films David Scheller often plays dubious characters and criminals.

In one of his most famous roles, David Scheller stars as Dieter Bockhorn, the former companion of Uschi Obermaier in the German film Eight Miles High.

David Scheller lives in Berlin.

== Filmography (selection) ==
- 1992: Geteilte Nacht
- 1992: Marienhof (TV-series)
- 1994: Tatort (TV-series)
- 1997: Mord für eine Schlagzeile (TV-movie)
- 1998: Explodiert
- 2000: Kanak Attack
- 2000: Zärtliche Sterne (TV-movie)
- 2001: Wambo (TV-movie)
- 2001: Heart Over Head
- 2001: Tatort (TV-series)
- 2002: Extreme Ops
- 2003: Polizeiruf 110 (TV-series)
- 2003: Play It Loud!
- 2003: Yu
- 2005: Die Bullenbraut – Ihr erster Fall (TV-movie)
- 2005: Katze im Sack
- 2005: Berlin Stories
- 2005: Your Name is Justine
- 2005: Nachtschicht – Tod im Supermarkt (TV-series)
- 2005: The Eagle (TV-series)
- 2006: SK Kölsch (TV-series)
- 2006: Fay Grim
- 2006: Where Is Fred?
- 2007: Pastewka (TV-series)
- 2007: Eight Miles High
- 2008: The Lost Samaritan
- 2008: Großstadtrevier (TV-series)
- 2008: Morgen räum' ich auf (TV-movie)
- 2009: Commissario Laurenti (TV-series)
- 2015: Der Bunker
- 2015: Buddha's Little Finger
