= Der Bunker =

2015 film

- Directed by: Nikias Chryssos
- Written by: Nikias Chryssos
- Produced by: Nikias Chryssos; Hans W. Geissendoerfer; Hana Geissendoerfer
- Starring: Pit Bukowski; Daniel Fripan; Oona von Maydell; David Scheller
- Cinematography: Matthias Reisser
- Edited by: Carsten Eder
- Music by: Leonard Petersen
- Production company: Kataskop Film; Geissendoerfer Film- und Fernsehproduktion KG
- Distributed by: Artsploitation
- Release date: 7 February 2015 (BIFF)
- Running time: 85 minutes
- Country: Germany
- Language: German

Der Bunker is a 2015 German horror-comedy film by Nikias Chryssos, in his feature film directorial debut. The film had its world premiere on 7 February 2015 at the Berlin International Film Festival and was released to DVD, Blu-ray, and VOD, alongside a limited theatrical release, in December of the same year.

Filming for Der Bunker took place in an abandoned house in Kleinmachnow. Chryssos has stated that despite the film's absurd nature, it is also a serious film, which he felt was personalized in the characters of Klaus and the Student.

== Plot ==
The film centers upon a nameless student (Pit Bukowski) who has rented a room at a lake-side home with the expectation that he will find peace and quiet. However, when he arrives, he finds that the room was far from what he expected, as the home is actually a bunker. He chooses to stay despite this. Soon after, his bizarre landlords (Oona von Maydell and David Scheller) begin to insist that he tutor their son Klaus (Daniel Fripan), who they believe will become President of the United States, despite being born in Germany. Stranger still is their insistence that an alien lives within the mother's leg, and that Klaus is only 8 years old, despite looking far older.

== Cast ==
- Pit Bukowski as Student
- Daniel Fripan as Klaus
- Oona von Maydell as Mother
- David Scheller as Father

== Reception ==
Critical reception has been positive and Collider felt that the movie was "A unique piece of work, Der Bunker is twisted yet engaging, abstract and parabolic, funny yet flippant." The Hollywood Reporter praised the film, writing "Though the story’s anything but realistic, this doesn’t mean that it has nothing to say; Chryssos’s well-paced screenplay suggests something, for example, about the dangers of burdening a child with unrealistic expectations, such as the parents’ insistence on Klaus's preparation for his future in the White House (the fact he's a German citizen is the least of this kid's problems, as Klaus can't even remember the capitals of Belgium and France)." Exberliner also praised the film, calling it "Funny, horrifying, theatrical, abstract, allegorical, and mysterious."

=== Awards ===
- Next Wave Award for Best Film at Fantastic Fest (2015, won)
- Prix du Jury at the Mauvais Genre Film Festival (2015, won)
- Prix du Jury de la Critique at the Mauvais Genre Film Festival (2015, won)
- Jury Award for Best Actor - International Film at the Fantaspoa International Fantastic Film Festival (2015, won - Daniel Fripan)
- Honorable Mention at Lund International Fantastic Film Festival (2015, won)
- Best Director at Ithaca International Fantastic Film Festival (2015, won)
- Best Film at La Mano Festival (2016, won)
