= Black Sheep (2006 German film) =

2006 film

- Directed by: Oliver Rihs
- Starring: Jule Böwe; Milan Peschel
- Release date: 19 August 2006 (EIFF)
- Running time: 1h 34min
- Countries: Germany; Switzerland
- Language: German

Black Sheep (German: Schwarze Schafe) is a 2006 German / Swiss comedy film directed by Oliver Rihs.

== Cast ==
- Robert Stadlober
- Tom Schilling
- Jule Böwe as Charlotte Heinze
- Milan Peschel as Peter Harminsky, Charlotte's Friend
- Marc Hosemann as Boris Wecker, the Imposter
- Bruno Cathomas as Roger, Boris's Best Friend
- Jenny Deimling as Daniela Köhler, Charlotte's College Friend
- Robert Lohr as Stefan Köhler, Daniela's Friend
- Barbara Kowa as Nadja, Vogue-Manager
- Michael Kinkel as Volker Dietl, Daniela's Rich Husband
- Manuel Flurin Hendry as Receptionist
- Oktay Özdemir
- Frank Giering
