= Willi Herold =

German war criminal

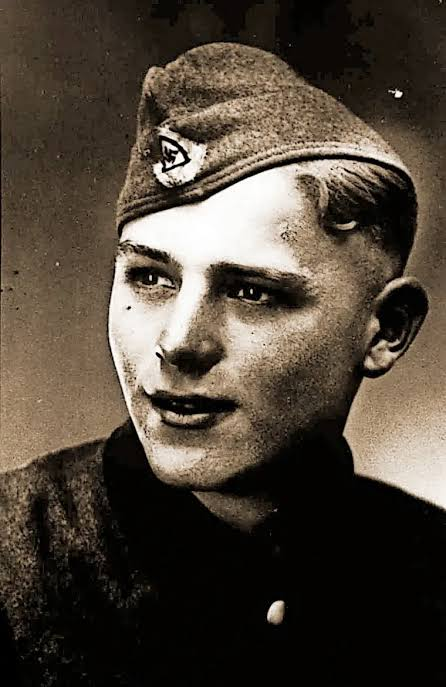
- Born: 11 September 1925; Lunzenau, Saxony, Weimar Republic
- Died: 14 November 1946 (aged 21); Wolfenbüttel Prison, Allied-occupied Germany
- Cause of death: Execution by guillotine
- Military career
- Allegiance: Nazi Germany
- Branch: Luftwaffe; Reich Labour Service
- Service years: 1943-1945
- Rank: Obergefreiter
- Unit: 6. Fallschirmjäger-Division
- Known for: Ordering the execution of approximately 200 prisoners while impersonating a Luftwaffe Hauptmann (Captain).

Willi Herold (11 September 1925 – 14 November 1946), also known as the Executioner of Emsland, was a Nazi German war criminal. Near the end of the Second World War in Europe, Herold deserted from the Luftwaffe and, posing as a captain, organized the mass execution of German deserters held at a prison camp. He was arrested by British forces and executed for war crimes on 14 November 1946 at Wolfenbüttel Prison.

== Early life ==
Willi Herold was born in Lunzenau, a small village in Saxony, on 11 September 1925. He joined the Deutsches Jungvolk, a section of the Hitler Youth, when he was ten years old. He was expelled the following year for skipping service and trying to organize his own "pack" of boys, both of which were against the organisation's regulations. Herold then joined the Hitler Youth proper at the age of 14, and for a time he was enamored with the group's benefits for members, including long nature excursions.

After completing his elementary education, at the age of 15, Herold began an apprenticeship as a chimney sweep in the neighboring village of Waldheim. However, he eventually ran away from the village with a friend because he did not feel like working and wanted to emigrate to the United States. He was apprehended by the Gestapo and sent back to Lunzenau, where he completed his apprenticeship in 1943.

Between June and September 1943, Herold served his Reich Labour Service on the Atlantic Wall in German-occupied France. Three weeks after turning 18, he joined the German Army and was deployed to Tangermünde.

== Second World War ==
=== c. 1943–1944 ===
On 30 September 1943, Herold entered military service. He was trained as a paratrooper (Fallschirmjäger) because of his above-average physical fitness. His division was the last to undergo near-full paratrooper training, with three months of infantry training and a sixteen-day parachute course. Herold was promoted to lance corporal after participating in the battles of Nettuno and Monte Cassino in early 1944. He claimed he was awarded the Iron Cross 1st and 2nd Class (for supposedly destroying two British tanks on the beaches of Salerno), the Silver Close Combat Clasp, the Silver Wound Badge, the Parachutist Badge and the Infantry Badge. Records of him ever receiving these medals have not been found.

=== Spring 1945 ===
In March 1945, Herold's unit retreated from the Netherlands to Nazi Germany. In the chaos of the retreat, Herold became separated from his unit in late March 1945 and was left to travel by himself the route (13 km) between Gronau and Bad Bentheim. In a shot-up Wehrmacht automobile that was lying in a ditch on the side of the road, he found the uniform of a highly decorated Luftwaffe captain and assumed the fictional identity of "Captain Herold of the Sixth Parachute Division." After convincing a major he met at a control point in Ochtrup, Herold received four soldiers under his command. Although he had a core group of 12 people, roughly 60 more would occasionally join him and depart when it was convenient for them. Despite claiming to be on a special mission from Adolf Hitler, Herold was only required to provide identification twice.

Along with numerous scouting missions, Herold also made numerous attempts to engage the enemy, culminating in him and his men joining the unit stationed close to the village of Lathen, which was occupied by the Allies. However, this effort failed, and Herold ordered a retreat when he lost too many men to enemy tank fire. Herold started to consider ways to recruit more soldiers as he grew frustrated that he lacked the men and equipment necessary to truly impact the enemy. He encountered local garrison commander Jann Budde in the village of Surwold, who informed him that hundreds of former Wehrmacht soldiers were waiting for the war to conclude in the Aschendorfermoor II penal camp. Herold discovered a chance to address his personnel issue and made his way to the camp.

On 11 April, Herold's group arrived at Aschendorfermoor II, a part of the Emslandlager camp complex which housed German inmates. There, he was asked by one of the camp supervisors, Karl Schütte, to judge a group of 30 inmates who had escaped during a forced march to Collinghorst and been recaptured. Herold ordered five of the men to be shot. He was eventually stopped by the judicial official Friedrich Hansen, who asked Herold to obtain permission from Dr. Richard Thiel, the head of the central administration of the Emslandlager camps. Having failed to obtain permission from Thiel after a lengthy visit, Herold visited Nazi district leader Gerhard Buscher, who got the Gestapo involved. Through Buscher, the Gestapo granted Herold permission to execute the 30 escaped inmates. Over the next two weeks, Herold ordered the execution of the inmates, as well as a large number of political prisoners from a list of 400 names compiled by Thiel.

Herold also chose a large number of inmates, equipped them with uniforms and weapons and dispatched them to the town of Leer to join the Wehrmacht. However, this plan was ultimately unsuccessful since the troops quickly surrendered to advancing Polish forces. On 19 April, British bomber planes attacked a nearby antiaircraft battery, and a few bombs hit Aschendorfermoor II, destroying the camp completely.

Herold recruited 12 prisoners and converted them into his bodyguards. They traveled north, terrifying the populace as they went from town to town. The band executed five Dutchmen accused of espionage after removing them from a nearby prison, making them dig their own graves, and hanging a farmer who had flown a white flag. Herold and his men were taken into custody in an Aurich hotel on 30 April by the Feldgendarmerie, hours before Hitler's suicide. Herold was put on trial by the authorities on 3 May, but the trial was interrupted and he was conditionally released, thanks to the combined efforts of the Kriegsmarine Chief Justice for the East Frisian region Horst Franke and Admiral Kurt Weyher. Herold was brought to a special unit, where he was warmly welcomed, but he swiftly left under the cover of darkness and traveled to the port city of Wilhelmshaven. Under his true name, he assembled a soldier's paybook and discharge documents before resuming work as a chimney sweep.

=== Arrest, trial and execution ===
Herold was arrested by Royal Navy personnel on 23 May for the theft of a loaf of bread and was sent to CIC Esterwegen. During the summer of 1945, the British investigated Herold's crimes, laboring under the initial impression that his victims had been citizens of Allied countries. On 1 February 1946, Herold and 50 other inmates from CIC Esterwegen were forced by the British to dig up the remains of the inmates murdered at Aschendorfermoor II. A total of 195 bodies were excavated.

In August 1946, Herold and twelve others were tried in Oldenburg by the British, overseen by Colonel Herbert Bown. Herold was notable for his apparently relaxed demeanor and lack of remorse. On 29 August, Herold and six other co-defendants: Karl Hagewald, Bernhard Meyer, Karl Schütte, Josef Euler, Hermann Brandt and Otto Paeller, were sentenced to death; Herold in particular was held responsible for the murder of 111 people. On 14 November 1946, Herold and the five other defendants were executed by guillotining by Friedrich Hehr in Wolfenbüttel prison.

== In popular culture ==
The massacre at the Aschendorfermoor camp and other aspects of Herold's impersonation are depicted in the 2017 German film Der Hauptmann (The Captain). Max Hubacher plays Herold in the film.

== Bibliography ==
=== Books ===
- Kurt Buck: In Search of the Moor Soldier. Emslandlager 1933-1945 and the historical places today. 6th, extended edition. Documentation and Information Center Emslandlager, Papenburg 2008, ISBN 978-3926277169.
- TXH Pantcheff: The Executioner of the Emsland. Willi Herold, 19 years old. A German lesson . Bund-Verlag, Cologne 1987, ISBN 3-7663-3061-6 . (2nd edition as: The Executioner of Emsland: Documentation of a barbarism at the end of the war 1945. Schuster, Leer 1995, ISBN 3-7963-0324-2).
- Heinrich and Inge Peters: Pattjackenblut. Dying to die - in line with 5 members. The "Herold Massacre in the Emsland camp II Aschendorfermoor in April 1945". Books on Demand, Norderstedt 2014, ISBN 978-3-7357-6297-9.

=== Film ===
- The Captain (German: Der Hauptmann) - film based on the events surrounding Herold. Directed by Robert Schwentke. Germany 2017.
