= Red (WildStorm) =

Comic book mini-series

- Cover to Red #3 by Cully Hamner

Publication information
- Publisher: Homage Comics; WildStorm; DC Comics
- Schedule: Monthly
- Format: Limited series
- Publication date: September 2003 – February 2004
- No. of issues: 3

Creative team
- Created by: Warren Ellis; Cully Hamner
- Written by: Warren Ellis
- Artist: Cully Hamner
- Letterer: John Costanza
- Colorist: David Self
- Editor(s): Ben Abernathy; John Layman

Collected editions
- Red: ISBN 1-4012-2346-X

Red is a three-issue comic book mini-series published by WildStorm imprint Homage Comics, both owned by DC Comics. It was created by writer Warren Ellis and artist Cully Hamner.

== Plot ==
Paul Moses is a retired agent of the CIA, formerly working in "foreign acquisitions". Living in a secluded area, his human contacts are limited to pleasant phone calls to his handler (who desires what she believes to have been Moses' type of work) and letters to a niece who lives in England.

Michael Beesley, the newly appointed Director of Central Intelligence (D.C.I.), and is briefed by Deputy Director (Operations) Adrian Kane on Moses' existence and the full extent of his activities. Disgusted by what he has seen and fearing public reaction should any of those secrets leak out, Beesley orders the assassination of Moses.

A three-man hit-team is sent to Moses' residence, but he kills them, recognizing the pattern of the attack and realizing his death has been sanctioned. He calls his handler, only to learn that she has been transferred. He informs the Agency that his status has changed from "Green" to "Red" before leaving his house and going on the hunt.

Moses telephones CIA Headquarters and is put through to Kane. Beesley breaks into the conversation and calls Moses a monster. Moses calmly replies that whatever he is, he became at the behest of his country. He says that he has now learned the identities of the men who ordered his death and hangs up.

Moses breaks through the cordon of agents surrounding his county and makes his way to Langley, Virginia, where he breaks into the apartment of his former handler, Sally, and forces her to give up the access codes allowing him to enter CIA Headquarters. Normally he would kill her but, instead, apologizes and says he genuinely enjoyed talking with her on the phone, before leaving.

Though Langley is surrounded by an army of security guards and soldiers, Moses breaks in anyway, killing several. When he calls Beesley's office, Beesley demands that Moses surrender, or he will have Moses's niece in England murdered. While Beesley is making this threat, Moses enters the office, disables Kane with a bullet to the hand, and informs Beesley that he has already visited Beesley's home and murdered his wife and children. Beesley collapses in shock, while Kane explains the events that led to Moses's attempted assassination: that it has become customary to appoint a civilian like Beesley as D.C.I. and that protocol required Beesley to be shown Moses's file. With no background in espionage or the military, he was unprepared for its contents and overreacted. Kane apologizes for the turn of events but says things have progressed too far to go back.

Moses tells Beesley that he lied, that Beesley's family is alive and well, then kills him. Moses plans to use Kane as a hostage to escape the building, but Kane refuses to cooperate and offers an alternative: with Beesley dead, Kane is acting Director and has the authority to reinstate Moses to active duty, and thus retroactively sanction all of his previous actions. Kane carefully explains that Moses has no other choice; that the foregoing debacle proves that Moses is unfit to live in the outside world. Moses sadly replies, "I never wanted to. I just wanted to be left alone" and kills Kane, too.

Moses steps outside the office, where an army of guards are pointing their weapons at him. Raising his gun, Moses says: "I'm the monster. Do your best".

== Collected editions ==
In June 2009, DC Comics released a collection of the series that includes the script to issue #1 and never-before-seen developmental art and a new cover by Hamner (DC ISBN 1-4012-2346-X, Titan Books, ISBN 1-84856-293-4).

The series was previously collected into a trade paperback with another Ellis-written mini-series, Tokyo Storm Warning:

- Red/Tokyo Storm Warning (144 pages, June 2004, ISBN 1-4012-0283-7)

== Film ==
Summit Entertainment optioned Red as a feature film after Warner Bros. declined to do so, despite the latter's status as the distributors of other DC film adaptations. Whiteout screenwriters Erich and Jon Hoeber wrote the adaptation, directed by Robert Schwentke of The Time Traveler's Wife and Flightplan and produced by Lorenzo di Bonaventura and Mark Vahradian of Transformers. Principal photography began in January 2010 in Toronto and Louisiana with stars Bruce Willis and John Malkovich. The film was more of a comedy as opposed to the more serious tone of the series, and several new characters were introduced. Ellis has stated that "yes, RED the film is very different. Not least because it needed to generate more material than the book itself actually constituted".

== TV series ==
In 2015, NBC was developing a Red TV series with the Hoeber brothers, Lorenzo di Bonaventura, and Mark Vahradian.

== Comic prequel ==
In the summer of 2010 and in light of the release of the film version of Red, Cully Hamner returned to both write and illustrate the Frank Moses character for a 40-page prequel called Red: Eyes Only. Warren Ellis gave his blessing to the project but chose not to participate.

In addition, four prequels were produced featuring characters created for the film and written by the screenwriters: Victoria, Joe, Marvin, and Frank.

Eyes Only and the four prequels were collected in one edition called Better R.E.D. Than Dead in 2011.
