= Down (comics) =

American comic book

Publication information
- Publisher: Image Comics
- Format: Limited series
- Publication date: 2005-2006
- No. of issues: 4

Creative team
- Written by: Warren Ellis
- Penciller(s): Cully Hamner; Tony Harris
- Inker(s): Cully Hamner; Ray Snyder; Dexter Vines

Collected editions
- Down: ISBN 2756004359

Down is a four-issue American comic book limited series published in late 2005 and early 2006, by Top Cow Productions, an imprint of Image Comics. The series was written by Warren Ellis and illustrated by Cully Hamner and Tony Harris.

Down tells the story of an undercover cop, sent on an unofficial mission to deal with a fellow officer who "went native" when infiltrating a drugs gang.
