= The Captain (2017 film) =

2017 film

- Film poster
- Directed by: Robert Schwentke
- Written by: Robert Schwentke
- Produced by: Frieder Schlaich
- Starring: Max Hubacher; Frederick Lau; Bernd Hölscher; Waldemar Kobus; Alexander Fehling; Samuel Finzi
- Cinematography: Florian Ballhaus
- Edited by: Michał Czarnecki
- Music by: Martin Todsharow
- Release dates: 7 September 2017 (TIFF); 15 March 2018 (Germany)
- Running time: 118 minutes
- Countries: Germany; France; Poland
- Language: German
- Box office: $241,358

The Captain (German: Der Hauptmann) is a 2017 international co-produced historical drama film written and directed by Robert Schwentke. It was screened in the Special Presentations section at the 2017 Toronto International Film Festival. It tells the story of German war criminal Willi Herold, who assumed a stolen identity as a German officer and orchestrated the killing of deserters and other prisoners at one of the Emslandlager camps.

== Plot ==
In April 1945, during the final weeks of the war, Willi Herold, a young Luftwaffe Fallschirmjäger (paratrooper) escapes the pursuit of a roving German military police commando who wishes to execute him for desertion. After his escape, Herold finds an abandoned car containing the uniform of a decorated Luftwaffe captain. Herold takes the uniform and impersonates an officer, taking command of a number of stragglers as he moves through the German countryside under the guise that he is on a mission, ordered by Hitler himself, to assess morale behind the front. Although initially promising the local populace a decrease in looting, Herold becomes increasingly despotic as more disparate troops join his command, named Kampfgruppe Herold. These troops include Freytag, a kind, aging rifleman who is made Herold's driver, and Kipinski, a sadistic drunk. Eventually, the Kampfgruppe find a camp full of deserters awaiting execution and assumes control over operations there.

While in the camp, Herold orders the execution of dozens of prisoners (with Kipinski being the principal executioner), and becomes increasingly infatuated with his newfound power. Over the course of their stay, Freytag becomes suspicious of Herold, and realises that the captain's uniform does not belong to him after seeing a tailor shorten the pant legs. Eventually, the camp is destroyed by an Allied air raid, and Kampfgruppe Herold moves to a local town. While there, the group loots considerably from the local population, and sets up a makeshift command post in a hotel under the name Sonderkommando und Schnellgericht [summary court] Herold. Under this command, Herold orders the execution of Kipinski. After a night of debauchery, the group's hotel is stormed by military police and Herold is arrested. In court, Herold claims that he acted only in the defense of the German people, and escapes out of a window to avoid being sent back to the front. In the final scene, Herold is seen walking through a forest filled with skeletal remains, and the audience is informed that after the war he and several of his accomplices were sentenced to death and executed by the Allied forces.

The ending credits are accompanied by a sequence of Herold and his group driving through the streets of modern-day Görlitz in their Mercedes-Benz G3, eventually stopping to accost and harass local passersby on foot.

== Cast ==
- Max Hubacher as Willi Herold
- Milan Peschel as Reinhard Freytag
- Frederick Lau as Kipinski
- Bernd Hölscher as Karl Schütte
- Waldemar Kobus as Hansen
- Alexander Fehling as Junker
- Samuel Finzi as Roger

== Critical reception ==
Review aggregator Rotten Tomatoes reports an approval rating of 83% based on 53 reviews, with an average rating of 7.60/10. The website's critical consensus reads, "The Captain makes chillingly persuasive points about the dark side of human nature -- and underscores how little certain tendencies ever really change." Metacritic, which uses a weighted average, assigned the film a score of 67 out of 100, based on 17 critics, indicating "generally favorable" reviews. Writing for The National WWII Museum, research historian Dan Olmsted praised the film's "captivating, beautiful, and disturbing" black-and-white cinematography, comparing its visual style to Schindler's List. Olmsted lauded Max Hubacher's performance as the highlight of the movie, noting that it powerfully illustrates the psychological transformation brought on by the uniform, as well as the loyalty and fanaticism prevalent among German soldiers during the closing days of the war. However, he critiqued the film's pacing following the destruction of the prison camp, stating that the subsequent sequences went on for “too long”.
