= Katze im Sack =

2005 German drama film

Katze Im Sack
- Directed by: Florian Schwarz
- Written by: Michael Proehl
- Starring: Christoph Bach; Jule Böwe; Walter Kreye; David Scheller
- Cinematography: Philipp Sichler
- Release date: 2005 (Germany)
- Running time: 87 min.
- Country: Germany
- Language: German

Katze im Sack (English title: Let the Cat Out of the Bag) is a German drama film directed by Florian Schwarz and written by Michael Proehl. The film's tagline translates to English as A romantic film for those who don't like romantic films. Set primarily in Leipzig, two apparently lost souls find one another but struggle to find romance against circumstances and their own divisive personalities.

The two lead characters, Karl played by Christoph Bach and Doris Jule Böwe, have a chance meeting on a train. The pair steal minor items from one another during the journey and that theft leads Karl to attempt to track down Doris to her place of work at a bar in Leipzig. Once in Leipzig, the pair each make convoluted attempts to get to know the other in a series of events coloured by disaffected members of Leipzig society including an older male friend of Doris and a brothel owner.

== Awards ==
The film was awarded the First Steps Award as Best Young Filmmakers Award in 2004. At the Max-Ophüls-Festival 2005 it received the best music award. The film was also shown at the Berlinale.
