= Tokyo Storm Warning =

Comic book series

- Cover to Tokyo Storm Warning #3, art by James Raiz.

Publication information
- Publisher: Cliffhanger/WildStorm (DC Comics)
- Schedule: Monthly
- Format: Miniseries
- Publication date: August–December 2003
- No. of issues: 3

Creative team
- Written by: Warren Ellis
- Penciller: James Raiz
- Inker: Andrew Currie
- Colorist: Wildstorm FX

Collected editions
- Red/Tokyo Storm Warning: ISBN 1-4012-0283-7

Tokyo Storm Warning is a creator-owned comic book series by WildStorm imprint Cliffhanger. Written by Warren Ellis with art by James Raiz and Andrew Currie, it was first published as a three-issue comic book miniseries in 2003.

== Creation ==
The book was written during a period in which Ellis mostly produced books in three-issue bursts for DC imprints, along with Mek, Red and Reload as he had reached the end of his exclusive contract with DC, and was reassessing his next steps. Ellis described Tokyo Storm Warning as "a gentle piss-take of the giant robot genre played straight". Raiz had recent experience drawing robots for Dreamwave Productions' licensed Transformers: Armada series; acquainted with Ellis already, he emailed the writer during a lull between Transformers assignments and was offered the chance to draw Tokyo Storm Warning.

Tokyo Storm Warning has been described as a homage to the anime Neon Genesis Evangelion with cyberpunk elements.

== Plot ==
In an alternate timeline, the capture of U-234 on 14 May 1945 and the discovery of its nuclear cargo (intended for the Japanese atomic program in Tokyo) leads the US to decide to use its first atomic bomb on the Japanese capital instead to prevent the Japanese developing their own device. Three months later on August 6, Tokyo is devastated by the nuclear attack.

Following this Japan finds itself plagued by giant monsters over the next sixty years. In August 2003, American military pilot Zoe Flynn arrives in the rebuilt city, on secondment to the Tokyo Storm Exo War unit. Tokyo Storm pilots the ARCangels, a trio of advanced, seemingly alien mecha that mysteriously appeared in Tokyo Bay in 1992. Equally enigmatic is Tokyo Storm Tower's power source. Flynn is assigned to take the place of fellow exchange pilot Kaneshiro in ARCangel 3, only for the city to immediately suffer a monster manifestation. With Tokyo being destroyed, Flynn has to go straight into battle with the other ARCangels despite her only previous experience being in simulators. Like other manifestations, the monster heads for Tokyo Storm Tower, which was ground zero for the nuclear blast in 1945.

With the launch of the other ARCangels delayed by technical problems, Flynn is left battling alone until the arrival of the experienced Renji Yamashiro in ARCangel 1, with the fight causing huge casualties in the city around them. With support from Yamashiro, Flynn is able to destroy the creature. Afterwards, she tries to find out more about previous unexplained robotic defenders of the city such as the Hypermen and Megashogun from Yameshiro and ARCangel 2 pilot Kishitani. Flynn later questions Sakai and Yameshiro about the unexplained appearances and motives of the monsters, but her investigation is cut short by a new manifestation - this time of an unprecedented three monsters simultaneously.

All three ARCangels are launched in response, but ARCangels 1 and 2 are swiftly incapacitated. With the trio of monsters bearing down on the Tower, Sakai confesses that he is the cause of the manifestations through keeping the source of the wonders in the Tower's Terminal Command. Flynn kills him and heads down into Terminal Command, finding a young boy called Eiko who has been drawing monsters and robots since the bomb dropped on Tokyo who is somehow causing them to appear but holding himself in stasis. Flynn is able to persuade him to walk into the suspended nuclear explosion and die, saving Tokyo and causing the various monsters and robots to instantly vanish.

== Reception ==
Tokyo Storm Warning has received largely negative reviews. In an overview of Ellis' work for Locus, Claude Lalumière called the series "sloppily told and confusingly illustrated" while also being "overly simplistic", comparing it negatively to thematically similar issues of Planetary. Publishers Weekly were also unimpressed, criticising the weak pay-off and Raiz' "cluttered and hard to follow" art.

== Collected editions ==
The series was collected into a 'flip book' trade paperback with Red.

Title	ISBN	Release date	Contents
Red/Tokyo Storm Warning	9781401202835	27 April 2014	Red #1-3, Tokyo Storm Warning #1-3
