= Max Hubacher =

Swiss actor

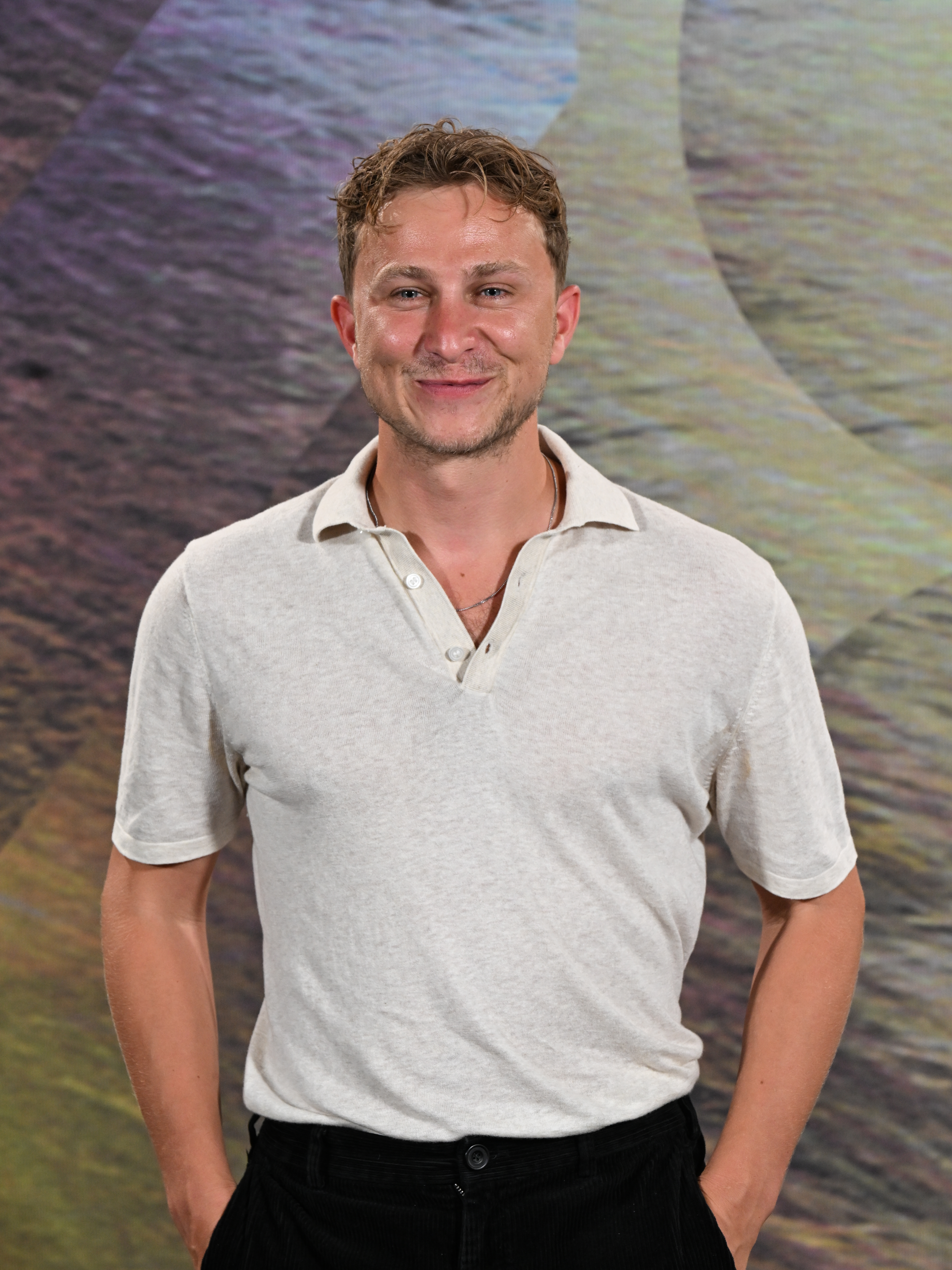
- Max Hubacher at the Locarno Film Festival, Switzerland, 11 August 2025
- Born: 1 October 1993 (age 32); Bern, Switzerland
- Occupation: Actor
- Years active: 2010-present

Max Hubacher (born 1 October 1993) is a Swiss actor. He became popular due to his acting in The Captain. He has appeared in more than ten films since 2010.

== Selected filmography ==
| Year | Title | Role | Notes |
|---|---|---|---|
| 2010 | Bold Heroes | Michi | |
| 2011 | The Foster Boy | Max | |
| 2013 | Night Train to Lisbon | | |
| 2014 | Nocturne | | short film |
| 2015 | Drift | Robert Felder | |
| 2015 | A Decent Man | Severin | |
| 2017 | The Captain | Willi Herold | |
| 2017 | Let the Old Folks Die | Kevin | |
| 2018 | Mario | Mario Lüthi | |
| 2018 | Midnight Runner | Jonas | |
| 2020 | Sleep | Christoph | |
| 2020 | Labyrinth of Peace | Johann | TV mini-series |
| 2021 | Monte Verità | Otto Gross | |

== Awards ==
- Shooting Stars Award (2012)
