= Philipp Sichler =

German cinematographer

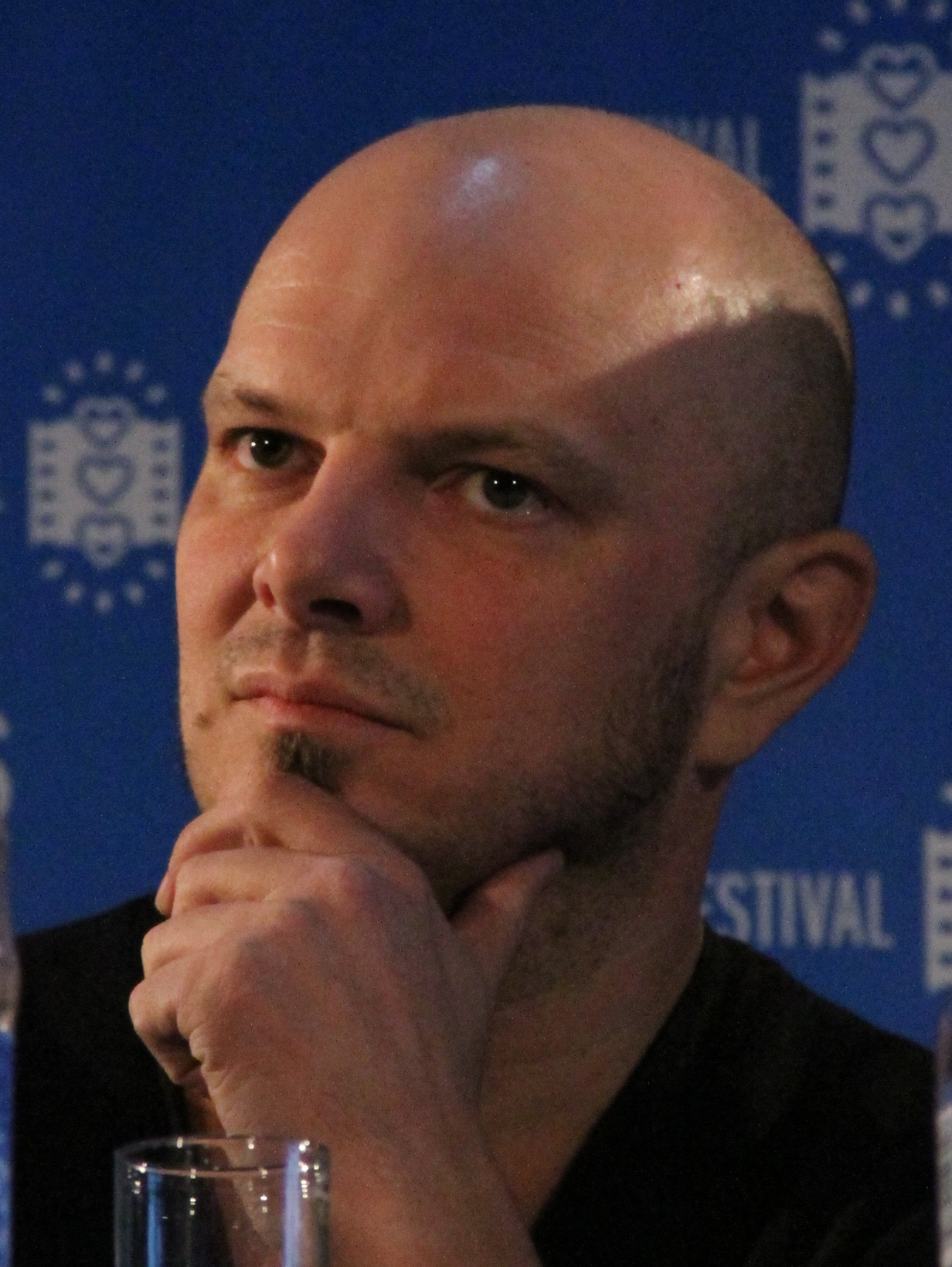
- Sichler in 2015
- Born: 16 July 1974 (age 51); Spaichingen, West Germany
- Occupation: cinematographer
- Years active: 2000-present

Philipp Sichler (born 16 July 1974) is a German cinematographer.

== Life and career ==
Philipp Sichler, born 1974 in Spaichingen has studied at the Film Academy Baden-Württemberg 1999-2004 camera. Then he worked for movie productions and television productions as a cameraman. In 2007 he was awarded the Deutscher Fernsehpreis for the Best Cinematography for the TV movie Sperling und die kalte Angst.

== Awards ==
- 2012: Deutscher Fernsehpreis-Nomination for Best TV Movie Hannah Mangold&Lucy Palm
- 2010: Deutscher Fernsehpreis-Nomination for Best TV Mini-Series Vulkan
- 2010: Adolf Grimme-Preis-Nomination for Up! Up! to the sky
- 2008: Adolf Grimme-Preis-Nomination for Sperling und die kalte Angst
- 2007: Deutscher Fernsehpreis for Best Cinematographer Sperling und die kalte Angst
- 2007: Deutscher Filmkunstpreis for Peer Gynt
- 2004: First Steps Award for Katze im Sack

== Selected filmography ==
- 2005: Katze im Sack
- 2006: Peer Gynt
- 2007: Sperling und die kalte Angst
- 2008: Werther
- 2009: Volcano
- 2012: Tatort: Der traurige König
- 2013: Tatort: Macht und Ohnmacht
- 2014: Tatort: Im Schmerz geboren
- 2015: Driften
