= Lorenzo di Bonaventura =

American film producer

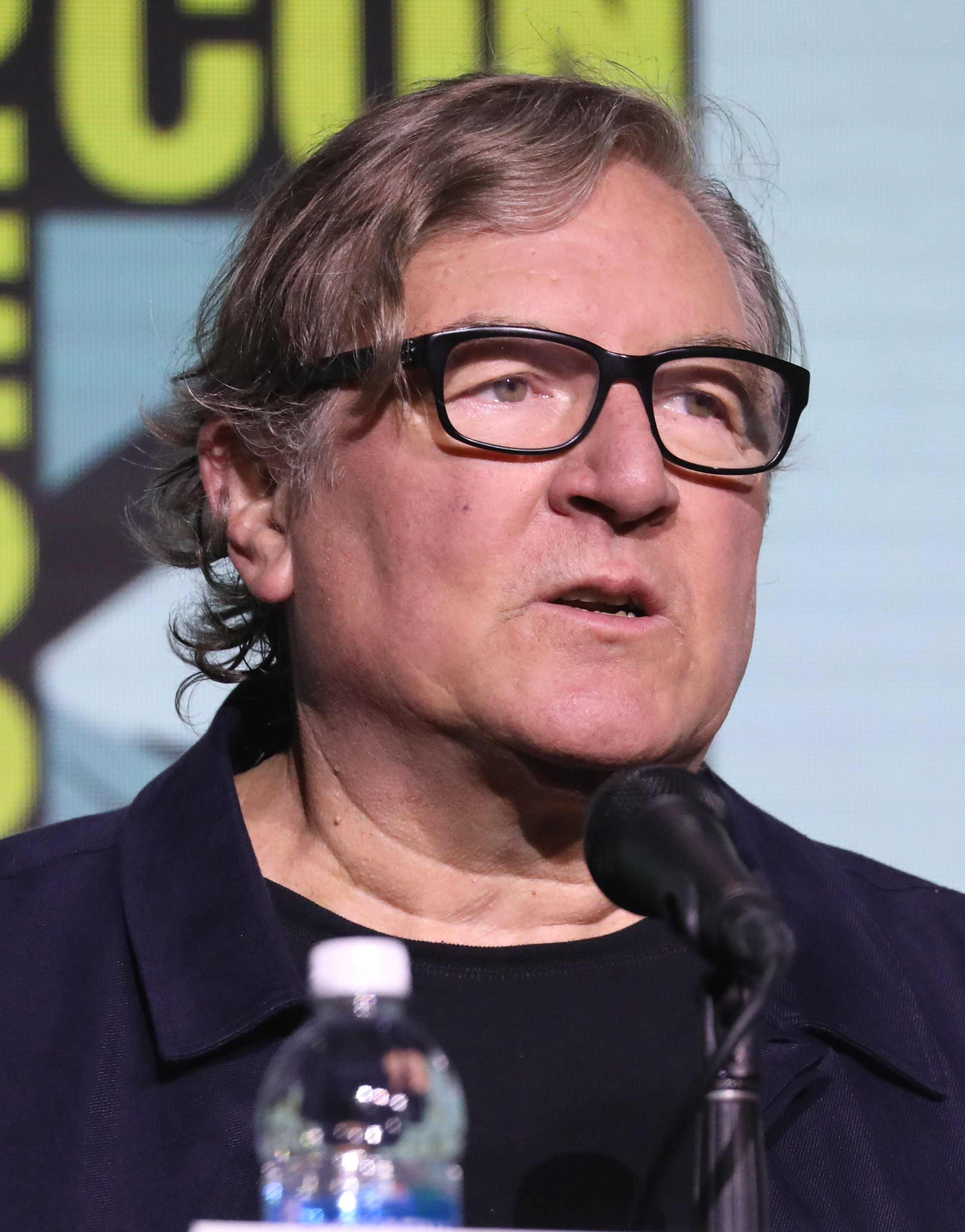
- di Bonaventura at Comic-Con in 2024
- Born: January 13, 1957 (age 69); New York City, U.S.
- Education: Harvard University; University of Pennsylvania
- Occupation: Film producer
- Children: 2

Lorenzo di Bonaventura (Italian pronunciation: [loˈrɛntso di bonavenˈtuːra, - ˌbɔ-]; born January 13, 1957) is an American film producer and the founder and owner of Di Bonaventura Pictures. He is best known for producing the G.I. Joe and Transformers film series. The films he produced have earned over $7 billion at the box office.

== Life and career ==
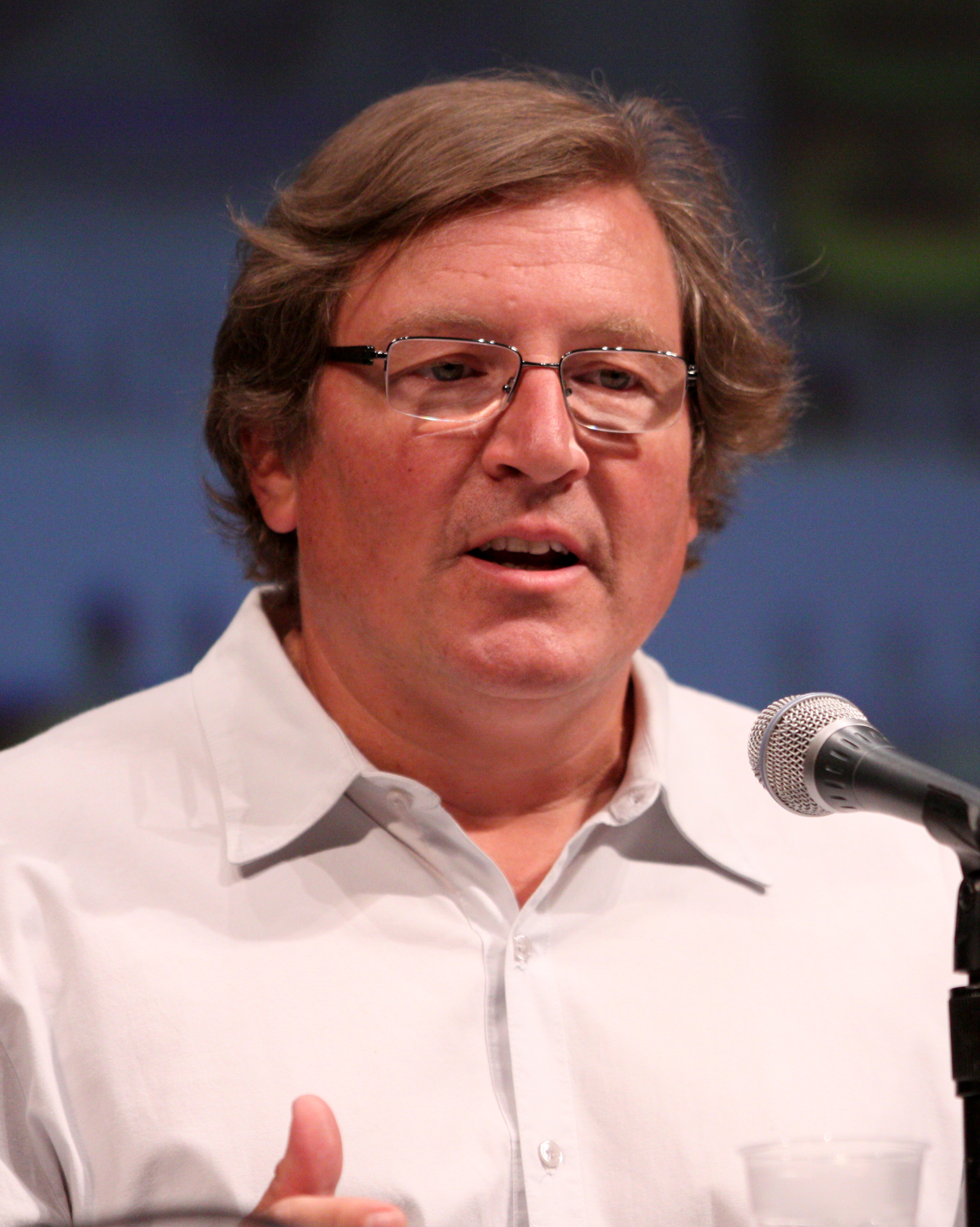
di Bonaventura at Comic-Con in 2010

Di Bonaventura spent the 1990s as an executive in the film industry, eventually rising to president of worldwide production for Warner Bros. Pictures. His production company, Di Bonaventura Pictures, is based at Paramount Pictures. His tenure at Warner Bros. included discovering and shepherding The Matrix into production, as well as purchasing the rights to the Harry Potter books by J. K. Rowling.

In 2007, di Bonaventura purchased the film rights to the six-part series of fantasy novels The Secrets of the Immortal Nicholas Flamel by Michael Scott. Di Bonaventura said that Scott's "fantastic series is a natural evolution from Harry Potter".

In the documentary Side by Side, di Bonaventura criticized the ubiquitousness of inexpensive digital cameras that allow anyone to become a filmmaker, potentially saturating the media landscape with awful entertainment that the public would not be able to distinguish from quality works. His argument stated that the new media landscape is flawed due to lack of a "tastemaker".

== Personal life ==
Di Bonaventura graduated from Choate Rosemary Hall and Harvard University, where he played soccer. He later received an MBA from the Wharton School of the University of Pennsylvania. His father, Mario di Bonaventura, was a symphony conductor, and his uncle, Anthony di Bonaventura, was a concert pianist.

Di Bonaventura serves as chair of the Creative Council for RepresentUs, a nonpartisan anti-corruption organization. He has served on the Claremont Graduate University Board of Trustees since 2015.

As of July 2013, di Bonaventura lived in Brentwood, Los Angeles with his wife and children.

== Filmography ==
=== Producer ===
==== Paramount Pictures ====
Year	Title	Director	Notes
2005	Four Brothers	John Singleton	
2007	Shooter	Antoine Fuqua	
2007	Transformers	Michael Bay	With DreamWorks Pictures
2007	Stardust	Matthew Vaughn	
2009	Imagine That	Karey Kirkpatrick	
2009	Transformers: Revenge of the Fallen	Michael Bay	With DreamWorks Pictures
2009	G.I. Joe: The Rise of Cobra	Stephen Sommers	
2011	Transformers: Dark of the Moon	Michael Bay	
2013	G.I. Joe: Retaliation	Jon M. Chu	With Metro-Goldwyn-Mayer
2014	Jack Ryan: Shadow Recruit	Kenneth Branagh	
2014	Transformers: Age of Extinction	Michael Bay	
2017	Transformers: The Last Knight	Michael Bay	
2018	Bumblebee	Travis Knight	
2019	Pet Sematary	Kevin Kölsch; Dennis Widmyer	
2021	Infinite	Antoine Fuqua	Via Paramount+
2021	Snake Eyes	Robert Schwentke	With Metro-Goldwyn-Mayer
2023	Transformers: Rise of the Beasts	Steven Caple Jr.	
2023	Pet Sematary: Bloodlines	Lindsey Beer	Via Paramount+ and Paramount Players
2024	Transformers One	Josh Cooley	

==== Sony Pictures Releasing ====
Year	Title	Director
2010	Salt	Phillip Noyce
2024	Madame Web	S. J. Clarkson

==== Summit Entertainment ====
Year	Title	Director	Notes
2010	Red	Robert Schwentke	
2012	Man on a Ledge	Asger Leth	
2013	Red 2	Dean Parisot	
2017	Only the Brave	Joseph Kosinski	With Columbia Pictures

==== Lionsgate Films ====
Year	Title	Director	Notes
2013	The Last Stand	Kim Jee-woon	
2016	Deepwater Horizon	Peter Berg	With Summit Entertainment
2017	Unlocked	Michael Apted	
2017	American Assassin	Michael Cuesta	
2023	Plane	Jean-François Richet	

==== Warner Bros. Pictures ====
Year	Title	Director
2005	Constantine	Francis Lawrence
2018	The Meg	Jon Turteltaub
2023	Meg 2: The Trench	Ben Wheatley

==== Others ====
Year	Title	Director	Distributor(s)
2005	Doom	Andrzej Bartkowiak	Universal Pictures
2005	Derailed	Mikael Håfström	Miramax
2007	1408	Mikael Håfström	Dimension Films; Metro-Goldwyn-Mayer
2013	Side Effects	Steven Soderbergh	Open Road Films
2015	Electric Slide (Uncredited)	Tristan Patterson	Paragon Releasing
2017	Kidnap	Luis Prieto	Relativity Media; Aviron Pictures
2018	Higher Power	Matthew Charles Santoro	Magnet Releasing
2018	Replicas	Jeffrey Nachmanoff	Entertainment Studios Motion Pictures
2020	The Secrets We Keep	Yuval Adler	Bleecker Street
TBA	Subversion	Patrick Vollrath	Amazon MGM Studios

=== Executive producer ===
Year	Title	Director	Distributor
2012	The Devil Inside	William Brent Bell	Insurge Pictures
2015	Dead Rising: Watchtower	Zach Lipovsky	Crackle
2016	Dead Rising: Endgame (Uncredited)	Pat Williams	Crackle
2018	Maze Runner: The Death Cure	Wes Ball	20th Century Fox
2018	Puppet Master: The Littlest Reich	Sonny Laguna; Tommy Wiklund	RLJE Films
2018	El Chicano	Ben Hernandez Bray	Briarcliff Entertainment
2019	Doom: Annihilation	Tony Giglio	Universal 1440 Entertainment
2024	Beverly Hills Cop: Axel F	Mark Molloy	Netflix

== Television ==
- Zero Hour (2013)
- The Real O'Neals (2016–2017)
- Shooter (2016–2018)
- Jupiter's Legacy (2021)
- The New Look (2024–present)
