= List of awards and nominations received by Sandra Oh =

Sandra Oh awards and nominations
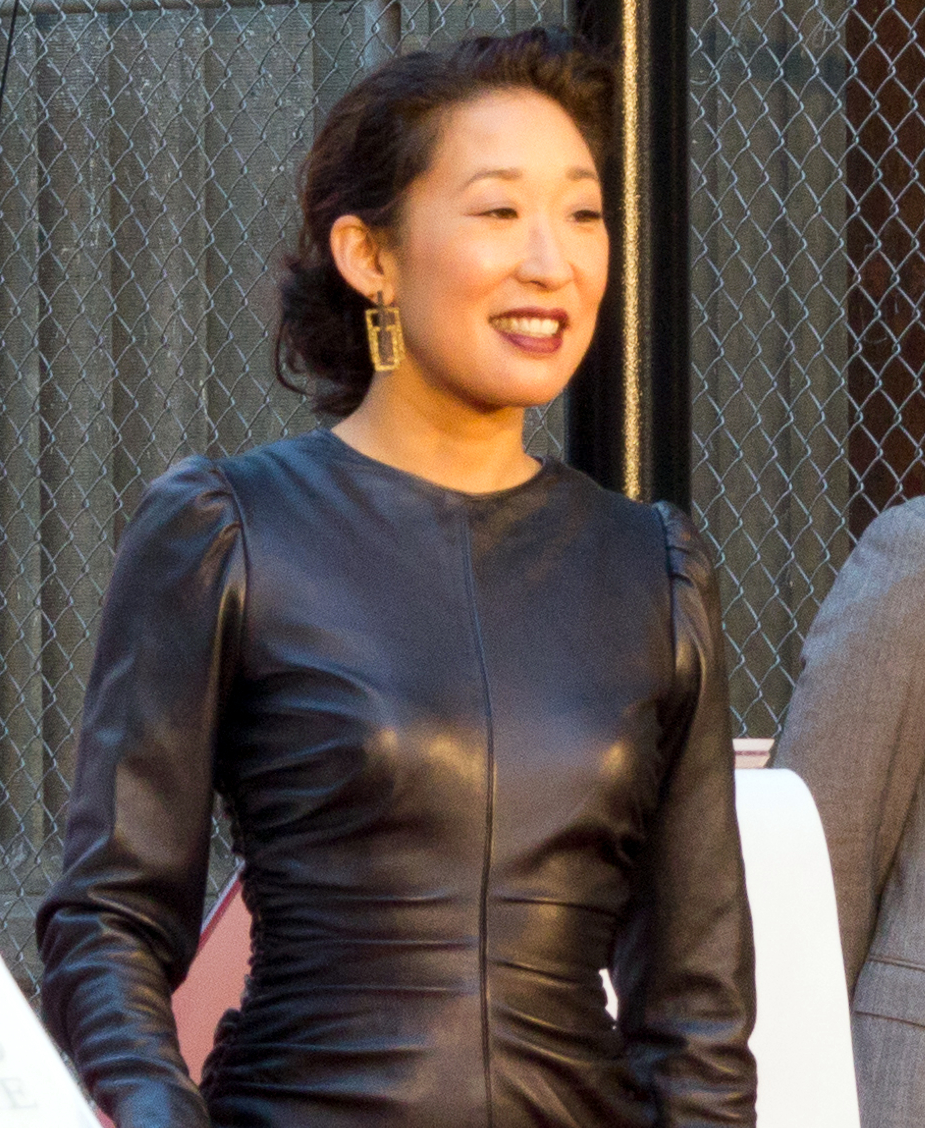
- Oh at the presentation of her star on Canada's Walk of Fame in 2011
Awards and nominations
Award	Wins	Nominations
British Academy Television Awards	0	1
Astra TV Awards	0	1
Critics' Choice Movie Awards	1	1
Critics' Choice Television Awards	1	2
Golden Globe Awards	2	2
Primetime Emmy Awards	1	14
Screen Actors Guild Awards	4	6

Totals (Note: Certain award groups do not simply award one winner. They acknowledge several different recipients, have runners-up, and have third place. Since this is a specific recognition and is different from losing an award, runner-up mentions are considered wins in this award tally. For simplification and to avoid errors, each award in this list has been presumed to have had a prior nomination.)
- Wins: 27
- Nominations: 76

The following is a list of awards and nominations received by Canadian and American actress and producer Sandra Oh. Among her accolades, she received a Primetime Emmy Award, two Golden Globe Awards and four Screen Actors Guild Awards.

== Major associations ==
=== British Academy Television Awards ===
Year	Category	Nominated work	Result	Ref.
2019	Best Actress	Killing Eve	Nominated	

=== Critics Choice Association Awards ===
Year	Category	Nominated work	Result	Ref.
Critics' Choice Movie Awards
2004	Best Acting Ensemble	Sideways	Won	
Critics' Choice Television Awards
2018	Best Actress in a Drama Series	Killing Eve	Won	
2021	Best Actress in a Comedy Series	The Chair	Nominated	

=== Golden Globe Awards ===
Year	Category	Nominated work	Result	Ref.
2006	Best Supporting Actress – Series, Miniseries or Television Film	Grey's Anatomy	Won	
2019	Best Actress in a Television Series – Drama	Killing Eve	Won	

=== Primetime Emmy Awards ===
Year	Category	Nominated work	Result	Ref.
2005	Outstanding Supporting Actress in a Drama Series	Grey's Anatomy	Nominated	
2006	Outstanding Supporting Actress in a Drama Series	Grey's Anatomy	Nominated	
2007	Outstanding Supporting Actress in a Drama Series	Grey's Anatomy	Nominated	
2008	Outstanding Supporting Actress in a Drama Series	Grey's Anatomy	Nominated	
2009	Outstanding Supporting Actress in a Drama Series	Grey's Anatomy	Nominated	
2018	Outstanding Lead Actress in a Drama Series	Killing Eve	Nominated	
2019	Outstanding Drama Series (as co-executive producer)	Killing Eve	Nominated	
2019	Outstanding Lead Actress in a Drama Series	Killing Eve	Nominated	
2019	Outstanding Guest Actress in a Comedy Series	Saturday Night Live	Nominated	
2019	Outstanding Variety Special (Live) (as host)	76th Golden Globe Awards	Nominated	
2020	Outstanding Drama Series (as co-executive producer)	Killing Eve	Nominated	
2020	Outstanding Lead Actress in a Drama Series	Killing Eve	Nominated	
2022	Outstanding Lead Actress in a Drama Series	Killing Eve	Nominated	
2024	Outstanding Television Movie (as producer)	Quiz Lady	Won	

=== Screen Actors Guild Awards ===
Year	Category	Nominated work	Result	Ref.
2004	Outstanding Performance by a Cast in a Motion Picture	Sideways	Won	
2005	Outstanding Performance by a Female Actor in a Drama Series	Grey's Anatomy	Won	
2005	Outstanding Performance by an Ensemble in a Drama Series	Grey's Anatomy	Nominated	
2006	Outstanding Performance by an Ensemble in a Drama Series	Grey's Anatomy	Won	
2007	Outstanding Performance by an Ensemble in a Drama Series	Grey's Anatomy	Nominated	
2018	Outstanding Performance by a Female Actor in a Drama Series	Killing Eve	Won	
2021	Outstanding Performance by a Female Actor in a Comedy Series	The Chair	Nominated	

== Other awards ==
=== Astra TV Awards ===
Year	Category	Nominated work	Result	Ref.
2024	Best Actress in a Limited Series or TV Movie	Quiz Lady	Nominated	

=== Boston Society of Film Critics Awards ===
Year	Category	Nominated work	Result	Ref.
2004	Best Ensemble Cast	Sideways	Won	

=== CableACE Awards ===
Year	Category	Nominated work	Result	Ref.
1997	Actress in a Comedy Series	Arli$$	Won	

=== Dorian Awards ===
Year	Category	Nominated work	Result	Ref.
2018	TV Performance of the Year – Actress	Killing Eve	Won	

=== Festival International de Programmes Audiovisuels ===
Year	Category	Nominated work	Result	Ref.
1995	Fiction: Actress	The Diary of Evelyn Lau	Won	

=== Gemini Awards ===
Year	Category	Nominated work	Result	Ref.
1995	Best Performance by an Actress in a Leading Role in a Dramatic Program or Mini-Series	The Diary of Evelyn Lau	Nominated	

=== Genie Awards ===
Year	Category	Nominated work	Result	Ref.
1994	Best Performance by an Actress in a Leading Role	Double Happiness	Won	
1998	Best Performance by an Actress in a Leading Role	Last Night	Won	

=== Gold Derby Awards ===
Year	Category	Nominated work	Result	Ref.
2004	Best Film Ensemble	Sideways	Nominated	
2006	Drama Supporting Actress	Grey's Anatomy	Nominated	
2006	Ensemble of the Year	Grey's Anatomy	Nominated	
2007	Drama Supporting Actress	Grey's Anatomy	Nominated	
2007	Ensemble of the Year	Grey's Anatomy	Nominated	
2012	Drama Supporting Actress	Grey's Anatomy	Nominated	
2018	Best Dramatic Actress	Killing Eve	Nominated	
2019	Best Comedy Guest Actress	Saturday Night Live	Nominated	
2019	Best Dramatic Actress	Killing Eve	Nominated	

=== Golden Nymph Awards ===
Year	Category	Nominated work	Result	Ref.
2007	Outstanding Actress – Drama Series	Grey's Anatomy	Nominated	
2019	Outstanding Actress – Drama Series	Killing Eve	Nominated	

=== Governor General's Performing Arts Awards ===
Year	Category	Nominated work	Result	Ref.
2019	National Arts Centre Award	—N/a	Won	

=== Gracie Awards ===
Year	Category	Nominated work	Result	Ref.
2019	Actress in a Leading Role – Drama	Killing Eve	Won	

=== Hollywood Reel Independent Film Festival ===
Year	Category	Nominated work	Result	Ref.
2016	Best Actress in a Short	The Scarecrow	Won	

=== MTV Movie & TV Awards ===
Year	Category	Nominated work	Result	Ref.
2021	Best Kiss	Killing Eve	Nominated	

=== NAACP Image Awards ===
Year	Category	Nominated work	Result	Ref.
2000	Outstanding Supporting Actress in a Comedy Series	Arliss	Nominated	
2009	Outstanding Actress in a Drama Series	Grey's Anatomy	Nominated	
2010	Outstanding Supporting Actress in a Drama Series	Grey's Anatomy	Nominated	
2011	Outstanding Actress in a Drama Series	Grey's Anatomy	Nominated	
2012	Outstanding Actress in a Drama Series	Grey's Anatomy	Nominated	

=== Nickelodeon Kids' Choice Awards ===
Year	Category	Nominated work	Result	Ref.
2023	Favorite Voice from an Animated Movie (Female)	Turning Red	Nominated	

=== People's Choice Awards ===
Year	Category	Nominated work	Result	Ref.
2011	Favourite TV Doctor	Grey's Anatomy	Nominated	
2011	Favourite TV Drama Actress	Grey's Anatomy	Nominated	
2014	Favourite TV Drama Actress	Grey's Anatomy	Nominated	
2014	Favourite TV Gal Pals	Grey's Anatomy	Nominated	
2015	Favorite TV Character We Miss Most	Grey's Anatomy	Won	

=== Phoenix Film Critics Society Awards ===
Year	Category	Nominated work	Result	Ref.
2004	Best Cast	Sideways	Won	

=== Satellite Awards ===
Year	Category	Nominated work	Result	Ref.
2004	Best Ensemble Cast – Motion Picture	Sideways	Won	
2005	Best Supporting Actress – Series, Miniseries or Motion Picture Made for Television	Grey's Anatomy	Nominated	
2006	Best Ensemble Cast – Television	Grey's Anatomy	Won	
2018	Best Actress in a Television Series – Drama/Genre	Killing Eve	Nominated	
2019	Best Actress in a Television Series – Drama/Genre	Killing Eve	Nominated	
2020	Best Actress in a Television Series – Drama/Genre	Killing Eve	Nominated	
2021	Best Actress in a Television Series – Musical or Comedy	The Chair	Nominated	

=== Saturn Awards ===
Year	Category	Nominated work	Result	Ref.
2019	Best Action-Thriller Television Series	Killing Eve	Nominated	
2019	Best Television Lead Actress	Killing Eve	Nominated	

=== Television Critics Association Awards ===
Year	Category	Nominated work	Result	Ref.
2018	Individual Achievement in Drama	Killing Eve	Nominated	
