= Black Power movement in Montreal =

The Black Power Movement in Montreal in the 1960s was a period of rediscovering black identity through a process of invoking cultural, economic, and political thought amongst Black citizens. The eruption of political activism during Montreal's Quiet Revolution as well as the reformation of immigration policies which discriminated against non-white immigrants allowed black communities to publicly express and bring awareness to their struggles with racism. The movement was an integral component of the emerging global challenges to imperialism during the 1960s, stemming from various movements including Garveyism, pan-Africanism, the Harlem Renaissance, Rastafari, and others. Montreal's Black Power movement culminated in the aftermath of the Sir George Williams Affair—a student occupation that resulted in an estimated $2 million worth of damages and 97 arrests—which raised concerns of racism worldwide.

== Background ==
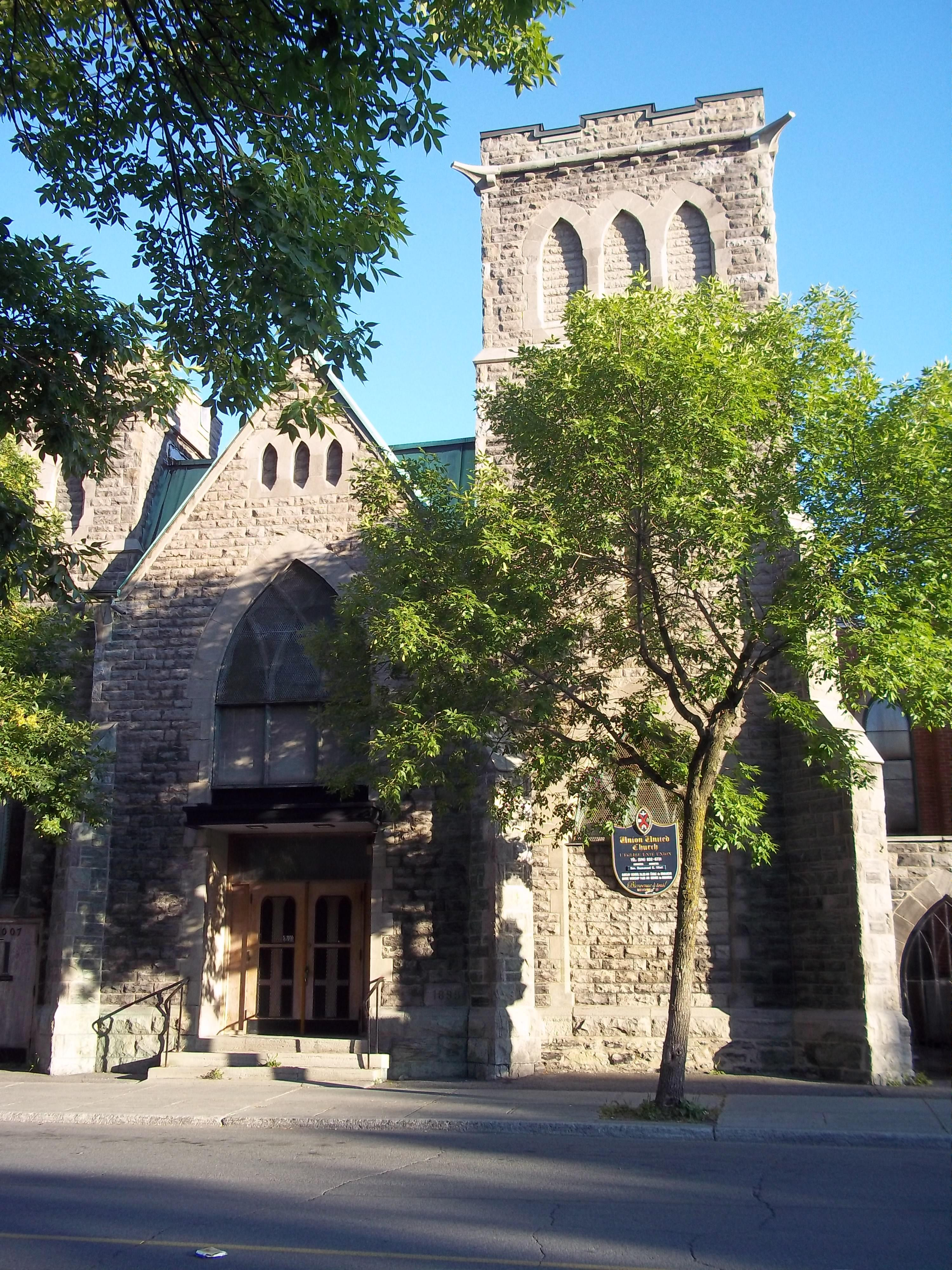
The Union United Church, the oldest religious institution of Montreal's Black community.

During the early 20th century, Montreal blacks primarily lived in the Saint Antoine district, where they were socially excluded and evicted to facilitate urban development, forcing them to disperse to other regions of Montreal. Structural racism was prevalent during the turn of the century and prevented Montreal blacks from obtaining respectable work or adequate housing.

=== Union United Church ===
Montreal's black community fought racial discrimination through the creation of various social groups such as the Union United Church (UUC) and the Negro Community Centre (NCC) in 1927. The UUC was originally called the Union Congregational Church of Montreal (UCCM). Founded by American-born railway porters in 1907, the UCCM was a response to the racial discrimination the railway porters had faced at white churches. The UCCM provided the black community with a space to worship freely without discrimination, and in 1925 the name was changed to the UUC.

Led by Reverend Charles Este, the UUC sought to improve the social conditions for the black community through leadership and development. In 1927, clergy members of the UUC founded the NCC, a charitable organisation that also sought to improve the social conditions for the black community. The NCC became a staple in Montreal's black community and contributed to the fight against racial discrimination by promoting black employment, hosting educational programs, and looking after the youth in the black community.

=== New immigration policies ===
After the Canadian government's removal of exclusionary immigration policies in the 1950s-1960s, which favoured non-white immigrants, Montreal's black population began to grow. This led to a large migration of West Indian and African blacks to Canada. These immigrants often came with job skills that advanced the economic standards for Montreal's black population. Despite these advancements, issues of racism and resistance from the black community against these issues persisted.

=== International influence ===
The internationally broadening language of dissent towards colonization during the 1960s sparked an increased sense of activism among black intellectuals because it was seen as an opportunity to be heard. This increased activism was rooted in the idea of Black Power, a slogan coined by Stokely Carmichael in 1966. During this period, a larger scale Black Power movement was also occurring in the United States. Black intellectuals in Montreal drew from the analyses of race and imperialism formulated by black intellectuals in the United States. The ideas of Malcolm X, Martin Luther king, and Stokely Carmichael inspired the Black Power movement in Montreal and the assassination of Martin Luther King sparked protest in Montreal. Locally in Montreal, many social groups expressing anti-colonial and anti-imperialist ideas formed during the Quiet Revolution. Among these groups were French Canadians, feminist groups, and workers rights groups. These various groups contributed to and borrowed from the circulating language of dissent in Montreal as well as internationally during this period. Montreal's Black Power Movement was one of the actors in the Quiet Revolution, and the struggles experienced by blacks resonated with other groups during the time.

Montreal's Black Power movement was inspired by third world liberation struggles. The liberation of India in 1947, Ghana and Malaya in 1957, and Algeria from French colonialism in 1962 inspired anti-colonial ideas in Montreal. The Cuban revolution inspired anti-colonial ideas in Montreal because Cuba's dissolution of trading ties with the United States demonstrated that a small nation could stand against a large imperial power. Black intellectuals linked institutional racism to imperial oppression and the Cuban revolution symbolized freedom from this oppression.

== Montreal in the 1960s ==
=== Negro Citizenship Association ===
The Negro Citizenship Association (NCA) was founded in 1951 by Donald William Moore. The NCA was a civil rights organisation that initially opposed Canada's exclusionary immigration policies which favoured white immigrants. After World War II, Britain encouraged Caribbean immigration to aid post-war recovery, however this inflow was restricted in the 1950s. Britain's tightening of immigration policies resulted in the Caribbean government urging Canada to allow Caribbean immigrants into the country. The NCA worked with the Caribbean government to publicly reveal and change Canada's exclusionary immigration policies. This united effort led to the West Indian Domestic scheme, which provided Caribbean females with the opportunity to apply for temporary or permanent residency in Canada after a year of domestic work. Canada's exclusionary immigration policy continued to unravel and eventually became a point system in the Immigration Act, 1967. By the 1960s, black activism was becoming more vocal in Montreal and the black community was beginning to take a stronger stand against racism. The influx of Caribbean students following the shift in immigration policies introduced anti-colonial ideas into Montreal's black community. These new ideas sometimes clashed with the more civil ideas of the established black community. By 1965, the NCA was beginning to take action against racism through their journal Expression. Expression typically published controversial, assertive articles advocating for the black community and denouncing racism. Expression also sought a strengthening of anti-discrimination legislation in Montreal. Following the assassination of Martin Luther King in 1968, Expression published an article advocating for violence in black activism onwards.

=== Caribbean Conference Committee ===
The Caribbean Conference Committee (CCC) was formed in 1965 by a group of Caribbean immigrants who sought to provide a platform for intellectuals to discuss anti-colonial ideas and formulate political as well as social change. Many Caribbean immigrants intended to return to the Caribbean and become politically active after earning an education, funds, or both in Canada. The common aspiration to fight colonialism in the Caribbean inspired a group of Caribbean men and women to form the CCC. Among this group were Alfie Roberts, Rosie Douglas, and Anne Cools. The committee held multiple conferences that featured influential activists from around the globe such as George Lamming and C.L.R James. The committee discussed and formulated political and social change in the Caribbean, which consequently inspired ideas of change in the local setting of Montreal. The Caribbean Conference Committee separated in 1967 when some members dispersed, however the name of the organisation was changed to the Canadian Conference Committee (CCC) which represented a shift in Caribbean focus to Canada as their home. Caribbean students became less concerned with Caribbean decolonization and more interested in domestic racial issues. In 1968, the assassination of Martin Luther King Jr. resulted in a turn to radicalism for some black activists. King advocated for unity amongst all races, however some black activists began to see violence and separation from Whites as the only solution to racial issues in the wake of his death, resulting in a shift to the Black Power movement. Montreal's black population voiced their rage through protests as well as two conferences. The first conference was a three-day event from October 4 to 6, 1968, held at Sir George Williams University. The conference was organized by black activists seeking racial equality through civil means. Inspired by the Caribbean Conference Committee and titled the Black People in Canada Conference, It addressed the local, daily concerns of Montreal's black population and featured Howard McCurdy, a professor at the University of Windsor, who emphasized the importance for blacks to understand their identity and have a voice. The conference also sought to reconcile class divide and conflict amongst Montreal Blacks, particularly between the Caribbean immigrants and established black Canadians. The second conference was a four-day event from October 11 to 14, 1968, held at McGill and it was titled The Congress of Black Writers. The most prominent speech at this event was Stokely Carmichael's, which amassed a crowd of over 2000 people and was centered around Black Power as well as the idea that blacks should liberate themselves internationally through revolution. Carmichael asserted that revolution was necessary to rebuild the social system that had previously oppressed blacks internationally through slavery and colonization. The majority of the attendance at this second committee was of a younger demographic and the radical ideas expressed conflicted with the more civil ideas of the Black People in Canada Conference.

== Sir George Williams Affair ==
Montreal's Black Power Movement culminated with the Sir George Williams Affair which ended on February 11, 1969. In response to the Sir George William's University committee's failure to act on six accusations of racially prejudiced grading against Professor Perry Anderson, roughly 200 demonstrators—mostly White—peacefully occupied the computer centre at the school. After 14 days, negotiations went astray and the occupation ended in a fire, roughly $2 million in damages and 97 arrests. The student occupation was the manifestation of the Black Power movement in Montreal and an international display of the daily adversities and discrimination faced by the black community. Among the occupants arrested were Rosie Douglas and Anne Cools, who were seen as the leaders of the occupation by authorities. Other occupants lost employment opportunities in Canada, and some had to migrate back to the Caribbean without completing their education. While the fire occurred, some White spectators chanted "Let the niggers burn." In a 1971 McGill Free Press article, Tim Hector denounced the priority given to the damaged computers over the students lives. Nonetheless, Hector also recognized the occupation as a declaration of black presence in Montreal society. Although many Anglophone students refused to support the protestors after the computer damages the protestors began to receive support from some francophone groups. The Confédération des syndicats nationaux (CSN), Montreal's second largest labour union, criticized the media for focusing on the material losses of the occupation instead of the racial issues in Canada. Francophone intellectuals had previously neglected the black community in Montreal, however the events of the occupation changed their views on race in the city. The Sir George Williams Affair brought the black community closer together and in October 1969, members of Montreal's black community occupied the Queen Elizabeth Hotel during an African Studies Association (ASA) session with the Canadian African Studies Association. Many of these occupants had participated in the Sir George Williams Affair and they teamed up with the African Heritage Studies Association, founded by John Henrik Clarke, to denounce the lack of Black representation within the ASA. This occupation was a demonstration of the increased militancy within the Black community sparked by the Sir George Williams Affair. Also, the occupation inspired the creation of the Thursday Night Rally within the black community. The Thursday Night Rally was a weekly meeting initially created to discuss news concerning the arrests of the Sir George Williams Affair. The meetings grew and eventually became a platform for communal discussions on racism in Montreal. The meetings would often feature historian Roy States, screen films about the Black struggle, and discuss Africa as well as South America.

=== Aftermath ===
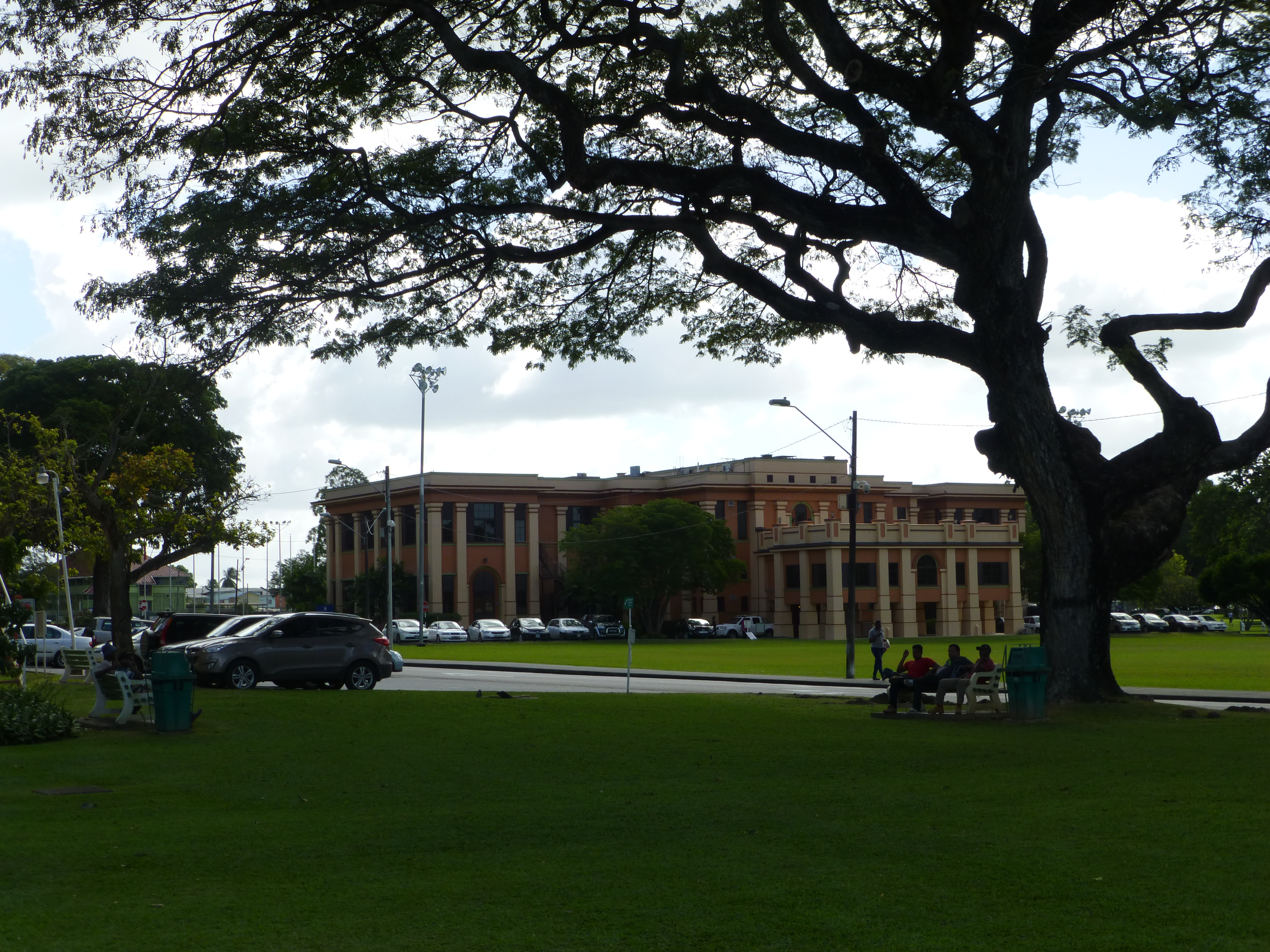
The University of West Indies St. Augustine Campus, where Daniel Roland Michener was denied access following the Sir George Williams occupation.

The inaction of the university committee and the outcome of the Sir George Williams occupation publicly displayed the racial tensions in Canada. In Montreal, the Sir George Williams affair revealed the covert racism in Canadian society and brought the Black community closer together. Although francophone intellectuals had previously ignored Montreal's black population, they showed support for the black community after the events and denounced institutional racism. The events inspired black activists to begin challenging imperialism through the entire community rather than solely through the university system. New organizations were formed such as the Black Coalition of Quebec, a Human Rights organization. The black community also created a controversial newspaper titled "Uhuru," which became a venue for black activism and recognized the colonization of blacks as well as other groups. The events of the Sir George William occupation also sparked anger in the Caribbean, where Roland Michener was denied entrance into the University of the West Indies on his "Good-will tour" in 1969. The arrest of 10 Trinidadian students during the occupation sparked protest in the West Indies, and the protests eventually transformed into demonstrations against the government and began a Black Power movement in Trinidad. Following these events, Trinidad's local military nearly deposed the government. Alfie Roberts, a black intellectual, believed the occupation affirmed the presence of blacks in Montreal and corresponded with the local labour unrest of the 1960s The Sir George Williams occupation triggered a Black Renaissance in Montreal and demonstrated the black communities refusal of continued discrimination.

== Criticisms ==
Similar to other social movements during the Quiet Revolution, Montreal's Black Power movement had its own contradictions. The Black Power movement drew on an idea of black masculinity, which was militant and exclusionary. At The Congress of Black Writers, Stokely Carmichael advocated for political change through violence, which received mixed reactions from members of the black community. Also, the movement used gendered language which excluded women. Defined as a "struggle for manhood," the Black Power movement was a call to black men and ignored the role of women. Black women felt the movement was hypocritical and devalued them- some believing they were oppressed by black men just as black men were oppressed by Whites.
