= Drive, She Said =

- Directed by: Mina Shum
- Written by: Mina Shum
- Produced by: Stephen Hegyes
- Starring: Moira Kelly; Sebastian Spence; Josh Hamilton
- Cinematography: Peter Wunstorf
- Edited by: Michelle Floyd
- Music by: Dennis Burke
- Production companies: 47 Films; Drive She Said Productions
- Distributed by: Seville Films
- Release date: September 8, 1997 (TIFF)
- Running time: 81 minutes
- Country: Canada
- Language: English

Drive, She Said is a 1997 Canadian drama film written and directed by Mina Shum. It stars Moira Kelly, Sebastian Spence and Josh Hamilton.

== Plot summary ==
Nadine, a bank teller, is taken hostage by Tass, who has robbed the bank to pay for medical care for his ailing mother. The film focuses on the developing relationship between Nadine and Tass, and Nadine's changing views in relation to her conventional life and relationships. The police and Nadine's longtime boyfriend, fellow bank employee Jonathan search for and successfully find her, though also find that she has been permanently affected by her time with Tass.

== Cast ==
- Moira Kelly as Nadine Ship
- Sebastian Spence as Jonathan Evans
- Josh Hamilton as Tass Richards
- Jim Byrnes as Dr. Glen Green
- Lori Ann Triolo as Jo (credited as Lori Triolo)
- Peter Stebbings as Detective Eddie
- David Hurtubise as Ben Polstein
- Hiromoto Ida as Sloan
- Mina Shum as Chen
- John B. Destry as Bob, The Guard (credited as John Destry)
- Hrothgar Mathews as Ernie
- Carrie Cain-Sparks as The Waitress (credited as Carrie Cain Sparks)
- Mike Crestejo as Bike Cop
- Amanda Leary as Bank Heistess
- Allan Franz as Medic
- Tom Scholte as Arnold, The Gas Guy
- Tom Shorthouse as Kindly Older Gent
- Tong Lung as Counter Person
- Alex Diakun as The Prophecy
- Carla Stewart as Mrs. Richards
- Harry Kalinski as Merlin, The Driver (credited as Harry Kalensky)
- Micki Maunsell as Cranky Lady

== Release history ==
The film, produced by Stephen Hegyes had a limited release. It premiered at the 1997 Toronto International Film Festival, where audience reaction was positive, but did not generate firm distribution interest. It was then shown at the Popcorn Festival in Sweden, in 1998. Also in 1998, the film was invited to the competition section of the Delle Donne International Film Festival, in Turin, Italy.

== Critical reception ==
The film was Shum's second film, after her well-received 1994 film, Double Happiness, which stars Sandra Oh. Drive, She Said received mixed reviews. Writing in Variety, Derek Elley described the film as "a meet-cute road movie that starts in high gear but soon takes too many left turns for its own good. Mina Shum’s second feature, after her well-remarked, Chinese-themed low-budgeter 'Double Happiness' is too mild a confection to motor on to much theatrical business."
