= Meditation Park =

2017 Canadian drama film

- Film poster
- Directed by: Mina Shum
- Written by: Mina Shum
- Produced by: Mina Shum; Raymond Massey; Stephen Hegyes
- Starring: Cheng Pei-pei; Tzi Ma; Don McKellar; Sandra Oh
- Cinematography: Peter Wunstorf
- Edited by: Daria Ellerman
- Music by: Andrew Lockington
- Release dates: 8 September 2017 (TIFF); 9 March 2018 (Canada)
- Running time: 94 minutes
- Country: Canada
- Language: English

Meditation Park is a 2017 Canadian drama film directed by Mina Shum. The film opened the 2017 Vancouver International Film Festival and was screened in the Contemporary World Cinema section at the 2017 Toronto International Film Festival. Following in the footsteps of her previous work like Double Happiness, Meditation Park highlights director Shum's Chinese ancestry. Notably, the film highlights stars Sandra Oh and Don McKellar. Shum's Meditation Park questions traditional gender roles and reveals difficulties associated with the immigrant experience. It debuted to positive reviews at the Toronto International Film Festival and opened in selected theatres on 9 March 2018.

== Plot ==
Maria (Cheng Pei Pei) is a 60-year-old grandmother who immigrated from Hong Kong to Vancouver 39 years ago with her husband, Bing, in order to create a better life for their children. On her husband's 65th birthday, which coincides with their move to Canada, Bing, an accountant, is called away to work with a client and returns home late. The following morning, Maria discovers an orange thong in his pants and is conflicted over what to do.

Realizing that her entire life has been spent catering to her husband, Maria decides to find work to try to have some financial freedom. She quickly realizes her experience is outdated and she is unsuitable for office work. She befriends three local Cantonese women: May, Anita and Su. The women teach her to manage her own business leveraging her backyard for parking space. She also meets Gabriel, an unfriendly neighbour who undercuts the women's prices. After they are almost caught by the police, Maria and Gabriel bond as he reveals that he is lashing out at his neighbours to cover the fact that he is struggling over his wife's terminal illness.

Maria begins following Bing and eventually discovers his mistress. After spying on her several times Maria is caught by the mistress who realizes who she is and cuts off her relationship with Bing. Bing falls into a severe depression and Maria feels so sorry for him she asks his mistress to take him back, which she refuses to do, recognizing she was wrong for ever starting a relationship with Bing.

Maria and Bing's daughter Ava, now a mother of two children herself, begins to push her mother to reconcile with her brother Charlie, who has become estranged from his parents due to an argument with Bing. Ava reveals that Charlie is about to be married and though Maria misses her son she decides she cannot go against her husband. Charlie's fiancée Dylan also makes a surprise visit to meet Maria and Maria welcomes her though she keeps the visit a secret from Bing.

Gabriel's wife dies and Maria hugs him. She is caught by Bing who forbids her to continue her friendship with him or to work. Infuriated by his controlling behaviour Maria finally decides to go to Charlie's wedding. Ava supports her decision and tells her father he can no longer control her mother or her by threatening to disown her.

The day of her departure Bing tries to stop Maria from going but she reveals she knows that he had an affair and that she refuses to live her life for him alone anymore.

== Cast ==
- Cheng Pei-pei as Maria
- Sandra Oh as Ava
- Liane Balaban as Dylan
- Tzi Ma as Bing
- Zak Santiago as Jonathan
- Don McKellar as Gabriel
- Nelson Wong as Peter
- Alannah Ong as May
- Lillian Lim as Anita
- Sharmaine Yeoh as Su

== Funding ==
In addition to receiving funding from Canadian Broadcasting Corporation (CBC) and Telefilm Canada, Meditation Park is also supported by the Harold Greenberg Fund. It is also noted in the credits of the film, that the production would not have been possible without support and membership of the Union of B.C Performers.

== Release ==
=== Critical response ===
On review aggregator website Rotten Tomatoes, the film holds an approval rating of 90% based on 10 reviews, and an average rating of 7.6/10. The Globe and Mail rated the film 3.5/4 stars.

Meditation Park was also reviewed by The Gateway who criticized the comedic efforts of the film but said it was emotionally satisfying and introduced interesting perspectives of Chinese women in traditional Chinese families.
