= True North (2025 film) =

2025 Canadian documentary film

- Directed by: Michèle Stephenson
- Written by: Michèle Stephenson
- Produced by: Leslie Norville
- Cinematography: Stephen Chung
- Edited by: Sarah Enid Hagey; Shannon Kennedy
- Music by: Andy Milne
- Production companies: Black Public Media; Firelight Media; Independent Television Service; Studio 112
- Release date: September 6, 2025 (TIFF)
- Running time: 96 minutes
- Country: Canada
- Language: English

True North is a 2025 Canadian documentary film, directed by Michèle Stephenson. The film profiles the 1969 Sir George Williams affair protests against systemic racism at Sir George Williams University in Montreal, Quebec, when a group of Haitian Canadian students occupied a ninth-floor computer lab.

The incident was previously profiled by Mina Shum in the 2015 documentary film Ninth Floor, with Pat Mullen of Point of View stating that the key distinction was that Stephenson's film "situates the occupation amid a wider appetite for change".

The film premiered at the 2025 Toronto International Film Festival.
