= Selwyn Jacob =

Canadian documentary filmmaker

- Born: 1941 (age 84–85); Trinidad, West Indies
- Education: University of Alberta (BEd); USC School of Cinematic Arts (MA)
- Occupations: Filmmaker, film producer

Selwyn Jacob (born 1941) is a Canadian documentary filmmaker whose work has often explored the experiences of Black Canadians as well as other stories from Canada's multicultural communities, as both as an independent director and since 1997 as a producer with the National Film Board of Canada (NFB).

== Life ==
Selwyn Jacob was born in Trinidad in 1941. Jacob attended a teachers' college there before moving to Canada in 1968 to complete a Bachelor of Education at the University of Alberta in Edmonton. While in Edmonton, he was influenced and mentored by film producer, author and broadcaster Fil Fraser. After graduation, Jacob completed a master's degree in film studies at the USC School of Cinematic Arts.

== Career ==
=== Directing ===
While teaching in Lac La Biche, Alberta, in the late 1970s, Jacob had the idea for his first film: a documentary about Black immigrants from Oklahoma who settled in Amber Valley, Alberta. After several years of research it was completed and called We Remember Amber Valley (1984). Jacob has said that he was the only Black Canadian film director in Alberta at the time.

Jacob's subsequent directorial credits include The Saint from North Battleford (1989), a portrait of Rueben Mayes; Carol's Mirror (1991), an educational film about racism and equality; Al Tasmim, a film about Canada's oldest mosque; and The Road Taken (1996), a documentary about the history of Black railway porters, which received the Canada Award from the Academy of Canadian Cinema & Television.

=== Producing ===
Jacob's interest in Black Canadian non-fiction storytelling continued as NFB producer, supplemented by a notable range of films by Asian Canadian filmmakers from Western Canada exploring their own communities' culture and histories. His NFB producing credits include The Journey of Lesra Martin, about Lesra Martin, a Canadian youth who helped to free Rubin Carter from prison; Jeni LeGon: Living in a Great Big Way (1999), a portrait of Jeni Le Gon, a Vancouver resident who was one of the first Black women entertainers to sign a long-term contract with a major Hollywood studio; John McCrae's War: In Flanders Fields (1998), a look at Canadian army doctor John McCrae, who wrote the poem, "In Flanders Fields"; Colleen Leung's Letters from Home (2001); Linda Ohama's Obāchan's Garden (2001); Ling Chiu's From Harling Point (2003), about the first Chinese cemetery in Canada; Eunhee Cha's A Tribe of One (2003); and Mighty Jerome (2010), a documentary film about African-Canadian track star Harry Jerome directed by Charles Officer.

In 2014, Jacobs produced Ninth Floor, directed by Mina Shum. The film documents a 1969 Montreal student protest against racism, known as the Sir George Williams affair, and was filmed in Montreal on the 45th anniversary of the event. Jacob had been aware of the event at the time, as a number of its participants were from Trinidad—including one from his home village—and Jacob has stated that it was always his intention to make a film about the incident.
