= Me, Mom and Mona =

1993 Canadian short film directed by Mina Shum

- Directed by: Mina Shum
- Produced by: Stephen Hegyes; Mina Shum
- Starring: Mina Shum; Mona Shum; So Yee Shum
- Cinematography: Gregory Middleton
- Edited by: Mina Shum
- Production company: Thoughts from the Asylum
- Distributed by: Mongrel Media
- Release date: September 1993 (TIFF)
- Running time: 20 minutes
- Country: Canada
- Language: English

Me, Mom and Mona is a Canadian short documentary film, written and directed by Mina Shum and released in 1993. The film highlights the interpersonal relationship between Shum, her sister Mona, and their mother So Yee.

The film premiered in the Canadian Perspective program at the 1993 Toronto International Film Festival, where it received an honorable mention from the Best Canadian Short Film award jury.
