= Long Life, Happiness & Prosperity =

2002 Canadian comedy-drama film

- U.S. DVD cover
- Directed by: Mina Shum
- Written by: Dennis Foon; Mina Shum
- Produced by: Scott Garvie; Christina Jennings; Raymond Massey
- Starring: Sandra Oh; Valerie Tian
- Cinematography: Peter Wunstorf
- Edited by: Alison Grace
- Music by: Andrew Lockington
- Production companies: CHUM Television; Shaftesbury Films
- Distributed by: Odeon Films
- Release date: September 7, 2002 (TIFF)
- Running time: 90 minutes
- Country: Canada
- Languages: English; Cantonese

Long Life, Happiness & Prosperity is a 2002 Canadian comedy-drama film directed by Mina Shum and written by Shum and Dennis Foon. The film stars Valerie Tian as a 12-year-old girl attempting to fix her single mother's (Sandra Oh) financial and romantic situation through the usage of taoist magic. Three stories of unrelated people connect as a result of her charms. The movie was produced by Shaftesbury Film Inc. and Massey Productions Ltd. in association with Chum Television. The film was filmed in Vancouver, Canada.

Long Life, Happiness & Prosperity had its international premiere at the 2002 Toronto International Film Festival on September 7, 2002 and its U.S premiere at the 2003 Sundance Film Festival. The film is distributed in Canada by Odeon Films. Long Life, Happiness & Prosperity was nominated as most popular Canadian Film and Winner of best Canadian screenplay in the 2002 Vancouver International Film Festival. Its actors Colin Foo and Tseng Chang also were nominated for best male supporting performance in a feature-length drama in the 2003 Leo Awards. The movie has also opened at many important festivals such as the 19th edition of Visual Communications' Los Angeles Asian Pacific Film & Video Festival.

== Plot ==
12-year-old Mindy Ho attempts to help her single mother win the lottery and better their living conditions through the usage of Taoist charms she found in a book from Lee Tai Tai's Fortune Telling and Appliance Repair shop. Her mother, Kin, works as a telephone psychic at night and at a restaurant during the day. During this entire time, Mindy attempts to match her mother with the restaurant owner; Alvin Wong. Meanwhile, Shuck Wong had just lost his job as a security guard. In shame, he dons his old uniform in front of his wife, Hun Ping, and pretends to go to work when he is really looking for a new job. When his wife gets a job while he remains jobless, he begins to feel worthless. Also at this time, Bing Lai struggles with his relationship with his father, who is a famous butcher in Hong Kong. He wishes to one day get rid of his father's disdain for him by working in his own butcher shop with his son.

When Mindy attempts to win a lottery for her mother using the taoist charms, Bing Lai accidentally cuts in front and resulting in him winning the lottery. With the money, Bing Lai buys his own butcher shop in an effort to reconnect with his father. During this time, Alvin attempts to kiss Kin in an effort to woo her over. The effort fails drastically, much to Mindy's chagrin. Mindy then resorts to using a love potion to create chemistry between Kin and Alvin. However, Alvin ends up drinking the tea with the owner of Bing's Butcher, Nelson Zong. Nelson falls in love with Kin while Alvin falls in love with Nelson. Nelson goes as far as serenading Kin while Alvin becomes enraptured by Nelson's singing.

When Bing attempts to make his son a partner in the butcher shop business, he discovers that his son never wanted to become a butcher but rather, intends to become a Zen monk. As a result, Bing Lai disowns his own son. At the same time, Shuck stops believing in the Yellow God, even resorting to destroying the shrine he created for his god. Mindy's frustration over her charms not working worsens her relationship with her mother.

In the climax of the movie, Mindy goes to a local park to try another spell in order to make everything better, only to find herself in the middle of a violent storm. In disdain for his son, Bing's father does not show up at the airport. A letter from his father declares that Bing was "dead to him" from the day he was born. Alvin and Kin bump into each other and discover that they actually like each other. They then search for Mindy in the storm and find her unconscious and trapped under a fallen tree branch. Meanwhile, Shuck contemplates suicide since has he has lost faith in his god and his own worth. At the last second, Shuck finds the turtle that a young boy previously lost, receiving this as a sign from God that he should live. Bing Lai accepts his son's decision to be a Zen monk. Mindy turns out to be unhurt, and she is seen dancing happily with Kin and Alvin.

== Subtitles ==
The film was made in Vancouver, British Columbia.

There are lengthy passages of dialogue in Cantonese, without English subtitles.

== Cast ==
- Sandra Oh as Kin Ho Lum
- Valerie Tian as Mindy Lum
- Ric Young as Bing Lai
- Chang Tseng as Shuck Wong
- Russell Yuen as Alvin Ng
- Donald Fong as Nelson Zong
- Christina Ma as Ada Lai
- Alannah Ong as Tam
- Tsai Chin as Hun Ping Wong
- Colin Foo as Lee-Tai-Tai / Yeu Wong
- Kevin Yee as Raymond
- Kameron Louangxay as Peter Lai
- Benjamin Ratner as Ernie the Manager
- So Yee Shum as Lee-Tai-Tai's Customer
- Rick Tae as Cute Delivery Guy
- Mario Carotenuto as Lottery Customer
- Jasmin Dring as The Matrons
- Diana Ha as The Matrons

== Production ==
=== Pre-production ===
Mina Shum originally planned on creating three different films. As she wrote each one, she discovered that the stories were interconnected, and decided to combine them into a single movie. With the idea, she decided to work alongside Dennis Foon in order to work the script into a higher standard. Shum then cast her best friend, Sandra Oh, as the main character of her movie. The rest of the characters were cast across three generations of people. Mina describes how having such a large generational gap made it difficult to convey some of her ideas into acting.

=== Themes ===
Mina Shum utilizes an Asian color sensibility in order to convey themes within her movie. She pairs each word within the title to a color that can be seen consistently throughout the movie. Blue represents long life, red represents happiness, and gold represents prosperity. The color schemes within certain characters frames then gives insight to their themes. Blue is prominent in Shuck and Hun Ping's scenes, revealing their desires for longevity. Kin and Mindy's search for happiness manifests itself in the color red. Gold finds itself in many of Bing Lai's scenes as he attempts to bring prosperity into his life. The main setting of the movie, the restaurant, then contains all of these colors in order to represent how all of these storylines converge. Through this, Mina Shum shows how every decision that somebody makes affects the lives of those around them.

Mina Shum has also stated that "the theme [of all my films] is 'You have one life, so you have to live who you really are'."

=== Film techniques ===
Mina Shum applies many techniques to ensure that the movie feels like it takes place in an authentic Chinese-Canadian community. One key distinguishing characteristic of this movie is its almost entirely Asian cast. Drifting from the traditionally non-Asian Hollywood cinema, Mina Shum cast every main character as an Asian. Shum then lights her scenes with soft and dim light in order to parallel the overcast skies that Vancouver often experiences.

== Critical reception ==
Long Life, Happiness & Prosperity has generally received mixed reviews. The movie has received from the Rotten Tomatoes 29% critical approval rate and a 62% approval rate from the general audience. While some critics, such as PR Newswire, see the film as a way to "portray contemporary Chinese Canadian life from a whimsical, humanistic perspective", others such as Liam Lacey from the Toronto's Film Critic Association believe that the film is "an awkwardly contrived exercise in magical realism".
