= Stephen Hegyes =

Canadian film producer

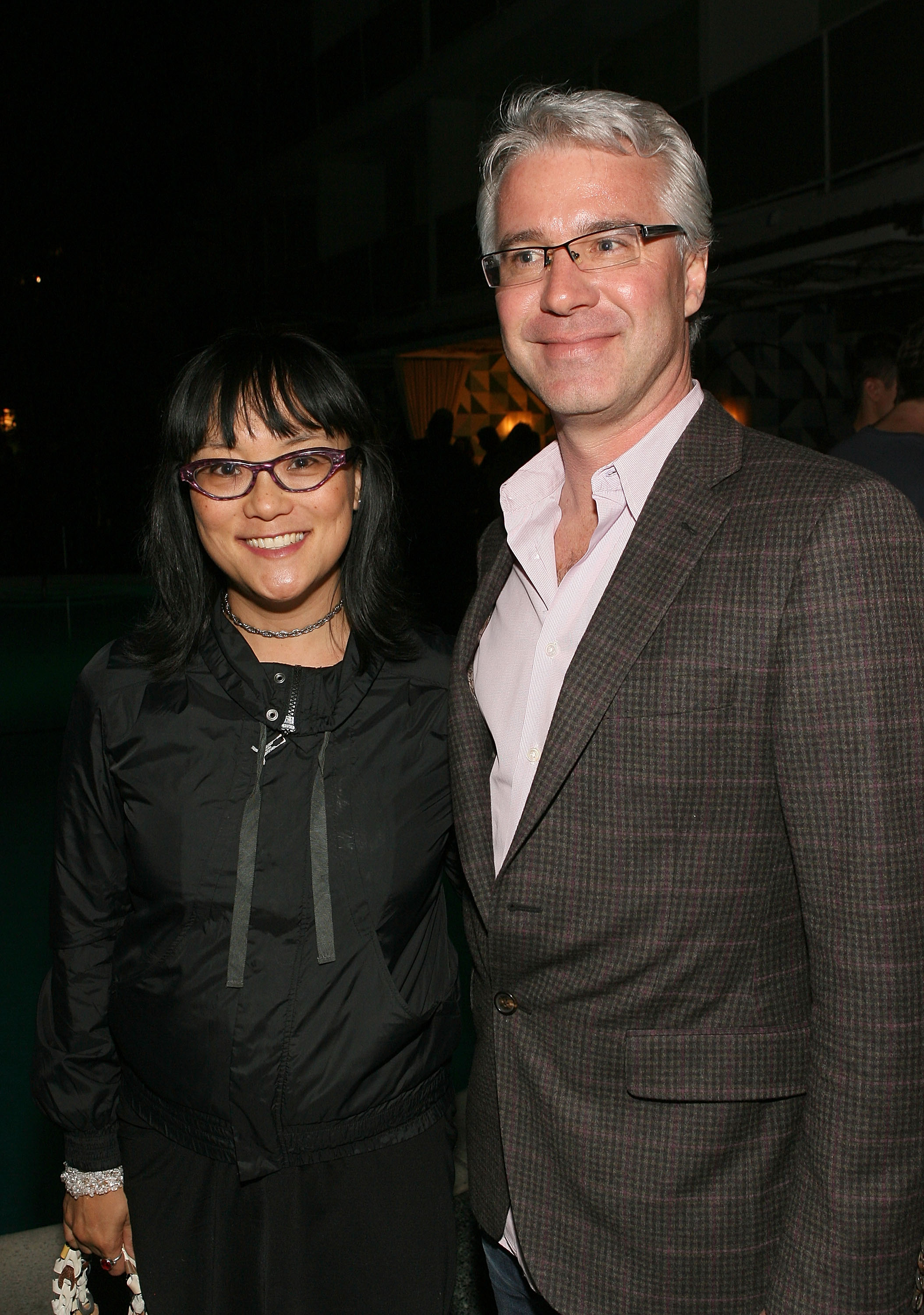
Hegyes with filmmaker Mina Shum in 2011

Stephen Hegyes is a Canadian film producer, associated with several films, including Double Happiness, White Noise and Whatcha Want.

== History ==
Stephen Hegyes is a graduate from the Masters Program in Fine Arts at the University of British Columbia, where he majored in film and television production. Hegyes' association with movie production commenced with his role as producer of Double Happiness, a 1994 award-winning film, written and directed by Mina Shum, starring Sandra Oh. Hegyes continued his association with Shum by producing her second film, Drive, She Said, in 1997.

Hegyes has won three Leo Awards, an awards program honouring the British Columbia film and television industry. In 2009 and 2011, he shared the award for Best Feature Length Drama for Fifty Dead Men Walking and Gunless, respectively.

Much of Hegyes' production work was through Brightlight Pictures, which he co-founded. It was announced in late 2012 that Hegyes had left Brightlight Pictures, but would continue to collaborate with co-founder Shawn Williamson on future projects. Williamson had purchased Hegyes' interest in the company. In late 2013, it was announced that Hegyes, along with Simon Barry, the producer of the Continuum Canadian television series, had established Reality Distortion Field, a genre film and television producer, with the objective of developing original content in the science fiction, horror and fantasy genres.

On September 28, 2018, it was announced that Hegyes will be credited as an executive producer alongside Simon Barry in the upcoming Netflix fantasy series, Warrior Nun.
