= Save My Lost Nigga Soul =

- Directed by: Clement Virgo
- Written by: Clement Virgo
- Produced by: Damon D'Oliveira
- Starring: Richard Chevolleau; Dean Marshall; Dayo Ade
- Cinematography: Harald Bachmann
- Edited by: Lisa Grootenboer
- Production company: Canadian Film Centre
- Release date: 1993
- Running time: 24 minutes
- Country: Canada
- Language: English

Save My Lost Nigga Soul is a 1993 Canadian short film, directed by Clement Virgo. An adaptation of the story of Cain and Abel, it was made while Virgo was a student at the Canadian Film Centre.

The film is about two Black Canadian brothers who live together but do not see eye to eye because one is a drug addict. Meanwhile their roommate, an aspiring stand-up comedian, is planning to use material about their disputes in his forthcoming performance debut.

Virgo's later feature film Love Come Down was an expansion on the themes of Save My Lost Nigga Soul.

== Achievements and awards ==
The film won the Toronto International Film Festival Award for Best Canadian Short Film at the 1993 Toronto International Film Festival, and was nominated for the Genie Award for Best Theatrical Short Film at the 15th Genie Awards.
