= Evelyn Lau =

Canadian poet and novelist

- Born: July 2, 1971 (age 55); Vancouver, British Columbia, Canada
- Education: Templeton Secondary School
- Occupations: Novelist, poet, short story writer
- Employer: Simon Fraser University
- Works: Runaway: Diary of a Street Kid

Poet Laureate of Vancouver
- In office 2011–2014
- Preceded by: Brad Cran
- Succeeded by: Rachel Rose

Evelyn Lau (Chinese: 劉綺芬; pinyin: Liú Qǐfēn; Cantonese Yale: Lau Yee-Fun; born July 2, 1971) is a Canadian novelist, poet, and short story writer.

== Biography ==
Evelyn Lau was born in Vancouver, British Columbia, on July 2, 1971, to Chinese-Canadian parents from Hong Kong. Lau attended Templeton Secondary School in Vancouver.

Evelyn Lau began publishing poetry at the age of 12. At the age of 13 she won an essay writing contest hosted by the Vancouver Sun, she was awarded a meeting with Pope John Paul II. In March 1986, at age 14, Lau left home due to parental objection to her pursuit of poetry. She spent the next two years living itinerantly in Vancouver as a homeless person living in group homes, friends' houses, and apartments. She also became involved with drug abuse during this time and supported herself through prostitution. She also attempted suicide twice.

A diary she kept from March 22, 1986, to January 20, 1988, was published in 1989 as Runaway: Diary of a Street Kid. The book was a critical and commercial success; Lau received praise for frankly chronicling her relationships with manipulative older men, the life and habits of a group of anarchists with whom she stayed immediately after leaving home, her experiences with a couple from Boston who smuggled her into the United States, her abuse of various drugs, and her relationship with British Columbia's child support services. The diary was adapted as a film The Diary of Evelyn Lau (1993), starring Canadian actress Sandra Oh.

Lau had a well-publicized romantic relationship with W. P. Kinsella, a University of Victoria creative writing professor and poet more than 30 years her senior. After she published a personal essay in 1997 about the relationship, Kinsella sued her for libel. ("Me and W.P." won a Western Magazine Award for Human Experience, and was shortlisted for the Gold Award for Best Article).

Her work in magazines has won four Western Magazine Awards and a National Magazine Award; she also received the Air Canada Award, the Vantage Women of Originality Award, the ACWW Community Builders Award, and the Mayor's Arts Award for Literary Arts. Her poems were selected for inclusion in Best American Poetry (1992) and Best Canadian Poetry (2009, 2010, 2011, 2016). Lau has also worked as writer-in-residence at the University of British Columbia, Kwantlen University, and Vancouver Community College, and was Distinguished Visiting Writer at the University of Calgary.

Lau lives in Vancouver, where she is a manuscript consultant in Simon Fraser University's Writing and Publishing Program. On October 14, 2011, Lau was named the poet laureate for the city of Vancouver. She is the third poet to hold this honorary position; her plan is to offer 'poet-in-residence consultations with aspiring poets'. As of fall 2023, Lau is the writer in residence at Langara College in Vancouver, British Columbia.

== Bibliography ==
=== Memoirs ===
- Runaway: Diary of a Street Kid - (HarperCollins,1989) (shortlisted for the Periodical Marketers of Canada Award. Translated into French, German, Italian, Polish, Chinese, Japanese, Swedish, Dutch, Portuguese, Korean, Bulgarian, Hungarian)
  - in German: Wie ein Vogel ohne Flügel. Transl. Uschi Gnade. Goldmann, Munich 1993
- Inside Out: Reflection on a Life So Far - (Doubleday, 2001)

=== Poetry ===
- You Are Not Who You Claim - (Beach Holme, 1990) (winner of the Milton Acorn People's Poetry Award)
- Oedipal Dreams - (Beach Holme, 1992) (nominated for a Governor General's Award and featured in the Michael Radford film, Dancing at the Blue Iguana )
- In the House of Slaves - (Coach House, 1994)
- Treble (Raincoast, 2005)
- Living Under Plastic (Oolichan, 2010) (winner of the Pat Lowther Award) ....
- A Grain of Rice (Oolichan, 2012) (shortlisted for the Dorothy Livesay Award and the Pat Lowther Award)
- Tumour (Oolichan, 2016)
- Pineapple Express (Anvil Press, 2020)
- Cactus Gardens (Anvil Press, 2022)

=== Short stories ===
- Fresh Girls and Other Stories. (HarperCollins, 1993) (shortlisted for the QPB Award for Notable New Fiction. Translated into German, Chinese, Dutch, Danish, Japanese, Italian, Hungarian)
  - in German, transl. Angela Stein: Fetisch & andere Stories. Goldmann, Munich 1996
- Choose Me. (Doubleday, 1999) (translated into Japanese, Swedish)

=== Significant essays and short pieces ===
- "I Sing the Song of my Condo" Globe and Mail (1995)
- "An Insatiable Emptiness" The Georgia Straight (1995)
- "On the Road with Family, Friends, and the Usual Questions" Vancouver Sun (1995)
- "Me and W.P. " Vancouver Magazine (1997)
- "Lay Off Me and W.P. " Globe and Mail (1998)

=== Novels ===
- Other Women. (Random House, 1995) (translated into Dutch, German, Italian, Chinese, Korean, Portuguese, Danish, Japanese, Greek, Hebrew, Polish)
  - in German, transl. Birgit Moosmüller: Die Frau an seiner Tür. Goldmann, Munich 1996
