= 1993 Toronto International Film Festival =

Annual Canadian film festival

- Festival poster
- Opening film: M. Butterfly
- Location: Toronto, Ontario, Canada
- Hosted by: Toronto International Film Festival Group
- Festival date: September 9, 1993–September 18, 1993
- Language: English
- Website: tiff.net
- 1994 1992

The 18th Toronto International Film Festival (TIFF) took place in Toronto, Ontario, Canada between September 9 and September 18, 1993. M. Butterfly by David Cronenberg was selected as the opening film.

Forest Whitaker won FIPRESCI International Critics' Award for Strapped.

== Awards ==
Award	Film	Director
People's Choice Award	The Snapper	Stephen Frears
Metro Media Award	Naked	Mike Leigh
Best Canadian Feature Film	Kanehsatake: 270 Years of Resistance	Alanis Obomsawin
Best Canadian Feature Film - Special Jury Citation	Thirty Two Short Films About Glenn Gould	François Girard
Best Canadian Feature Film - Special Jury Citation	Zero Patience	John Greyson
Best Canadian Short Film	Save My Lost Nigga Soul	Clement Virgo
Best Canadian Short Film - Special Jury Citation	Me, Mom and Mona	Mina Shum
FIPRESCI International Critics' Award	Strapped	Forest Whitaker

== Programme ==
=== Gala presentations ===
- The Accompanist (L'Accompagnatrice), Claude Miller
- Belle Époque, Fernando Trueba
- Bitter Moon, Roman Polanski
- Bopha!, Morgan Freeman
- A Bronx Tale by Robert De Niro
- A Dangerous Woman, Stephen Gyllenhaal
- Even Cowgirls Get the Blues, Gus Van Sant
- Flight of the Innocent, Carlo Carlei
- The Joy Luck Club, Wayne Wang
- A Life in the Theatre, Gregory Mosher
- Love and Human Remains, Denys Arcand
- M. Butterfly, David Cronenberg
- The Movie Teller (Der Kinoerzähler), Bernhard Sinkel
- The Piano, Jane Campion
- Red Rock West, John Dahl
- Rudy, David Anspaugh
- The Snapper, Stephen Frears
- Thirty Two Short Films About Glenn Gould, François Girard

=== Special presentations ===
- Arizona Dream, Emir Kusturica
- The Baby of Mâcon, Peter Greenaway
- El Cid, Anthony Mann
- L'enfant lion, Patrick Grandperret
- Farewell My Concubine, Chen Kaige
- Friends, Elaine Proctor
- Hadashi no pikunikku, Shinobu Yaguchi
- Madadayo, Akira Kurosawa
- The Puppetmaster, Hou Hsiao-hsien
- Romeo Is Bleeding, Peter Medak
- The Saint of Fort Washington by Tim Hunter
- Three Colors: Blue, Krzysztof Kieślowski

=== World Cinema ===
- 1, 2, 3, Sun (Un, deux, trois, soleil), Bertrand Blier
- The Ballad of Little Jo, Maggie Greenwald
- The Cement Garden, Andrew Birkin
- La Crise, Coline Serreau
- Daens, Stijn Coninx
- Darkness in Tallinn, Ilkka Järvi-Laturi
- Gorilla Bathes at Noon, Dusan Makavejev
- Half Japanese: The Band That Would Be King, Jeff Feuerzeig
- Hélas pour moi, Jean-Luc Godard
- Household Saints, Nancy Savoca
- Le journal de Lady M., Alain Tanner
- Kaspar Hauser, Peter Sehr
- Lessons of Darkness, Werner Herzog
- Naked by Mike Leigh
- A New Life (Une nouvelle vie), Olivier Assayas
- Raining Stones, Ken Loach
- Samba Traoré, Idrissa Ouedraogo
- Sankofa, Haile Gerima
- Shadow of a Doubt (L'ombre du doute), Aline Issermann
- These Hands, Flora M’mbugu-Schelling
- The Wedding Banquet, Ang Lee
- Wendemi, l'enfant du bon Dieu, S. Pierre Yameogo
- The Wonderful, Horrible Life of Leni Riefenstahl, Ray Müller

=== Italian Section ===
- L'aria serena dell'ovest by Silvio Soldini
- Un'anima divisa in due by Silvio Soldini

=== Latin American Panorama ===
- Cronos, Guillermo del Toro
- I Don't Want to Talk About It, Marcello Mastroianni
- Unexpected Encounter (Encuentro Inesperado), Jaime Humberto Hermosillo

=== The Edge ===
- Kosh ba kosh by Bakhtyar Khudojnazarov

=== Spotlight ===
- Roi blanc, dame rouge by Sergei Bodrov

=== Canadian Perspective ===
- Because Why, Arto Paragamian
- Blockade, Nettie Wild
- The Burning Season, Harvey Crossland
- Cap Tourmente, Michel Langlois
- Crad Kilodney, Peter F. Glen
- I Love a Man in Uniform, David Wellington
- Kanehsatake: 270 Years of Resistance, Alanis Obomsawin
- Ley Lines, Patricia Gruben
- The Lotus Eaters, Paul Shapiro
- Me, Mom and Mona, Mina Shum
- Moving the Mountain, William Ging Wee Dere and Malcolm Guy
- Mustard Bath, Darrell Wasyk
- Paris, France, Jerry Ciccoritti
- Picture of Light, Peter Mettler
- Save My Lost Nigga Soul, Clement Virgo
- The Sex of the Stars (Le sexe des étoiles), Paule Baillargeon
- Small Pleasures, Keith Lock
- Telewhore, Spencer Rice
- Two Brothers, a Girl and a Gun, William Hornecker
- Zero Patience, John Greyson

=== 10 x 10 ===
- The Dead Father, Guy Maddin
- The Forgotten War (La Guerre oubliée), Richard Boutet
- The Grocer's Wife, John Pozer
- Intimate Power (Pouvoir intime), Yves Simoneau
- Life Classes, William D. MacGillivray
- Pissoir, John Greyson
- Sonatine, Micheline Lanctôt

=== First Cinema ===
- Boxing Helena, Jennifer Lynch
- Don't Call Me Frankie, Thomas Fucci
- Kalifornia, Dominic Sena
- Menace II Society, Allen and Albert Hughes
- The Scent of Green Papaya, Tran Anh Hung
- Suture, Scott McGehee and David Siegel

=== Midnight Madness ===
- Acción mutante by Álex de la Iglesia
- Dazed and Confused by Richard Linklater
- Freaked by Alex Winter & Tom Stern
- Frauds by Stephan Elliott
- Jack Be Nimble by Garth Maxwell
- The Last Border by Mika Kaurismäki
- The Making of And God Spoke by Arthur Borman
- Trauma by Dario Argento
- Wicked City by Yoshiaki Kawajiri
- The Wicked City by Tsui Hark, Peter Mak

== Top 10 Canadian Films of All Time ==
In 1993 a new Top 10 Canadian Films of All Time list was made, an exercise previously carried out in 1984 and later repeated in 2004.

Rank	Title	Year	Director
1	Mon oncle Antoine	1971	Claude Jutra
2	Jesus of Montreal	1989	Denys Arcand
3	Goin' Down the Road	1970	Don Shebib
4	The Decline of the American Empire	1986	Denys Arcand
5	Good Riddance (Les Bons débarras)	1980	Francis Mankiewicz
6	Orders (Les Ordres)	1974	Michel Brault
7	The Apprenticeship of Duddy Kravitz	1974	Ted Kotcheff
8	The Grey Fox	1983	Phillip Borsos
9	I've Heard the Mermaids Singing	1987	Patricia Rozema
10	The Adjuster	1991	Atom Egoyan
