= Whatcha Want (film) =

- Directed by: Mina Shum
- Written by: Mina Shum
- Produced by: Stephen Hegyes; Raymond Massey; Mina Shum
- Starring: Isabella Wei; Ming-Na Wen; Tzi Ma
- Cinematography: Brian J. Johnson
- Edited by: Lara Mazur
- Music by: Andrew Lockington
- Production companies: Mongrel Media; Thoughts from the Asylum
- Distributed by: Mongrel Media; Crave
- Release date: September 12, 2026 (TIFF)
- Running time: 90 minutes
- Country: Canada
- Languages: English; Cantonese; Mandarin

Whatcha Want is a 2026 Canadian drama film written and directed by Mina Shum. Described by its producers as a cross between Crazy Rich Asians and Flashdance, the film stars Isabella Wei as Yin, a woman from Hong Kong who emigrated to Canada as the "trophy wife" of a wealthy Canadian businessman, who rediscovers her love of dance after discovering her husband's betrayal.

The cast also includes Ming-Na Wen, Tzi Ma, Helen Dang, Manny Hernandez, Russell Lee, Ryan Mah, Anya Sydelle, Hugh Tran, Phoenix Tsang and Rickie Wang.

The film was shot in winter 2026 in Vancouver, Victoria and Hong Kong.

The film premiered at the 2026 Toronto International Film Festival.
