= Peter Wunstorf =

Canadian cinematographer

Peter Wunstorf (born July 15, 1959) is a Canadian cinematographer from Edmonton, Alberta. He is most noted for his work on the 1994 film Double Happiness, for which he was a Genie Award nominee for Best Cinematography at the 15th Genie Awards in 1994.

== Filmography ==
=== Film ===
Year	Title	Notes
1987	Just My Luck!	
1989	Age Is No Barrier	Short
1991	The Grocer's Wife	
1991	Solitaire	
1993	Tomcat: Dangerous Desires	
1993	The Perfect Man	
1994	Breaking Point	
1994	Double Happiness	
1994	Road to Saddle River	
1994	Strange and Rich	
1995	The Michelle Apartments	
1996	Invasion of Privacy	
1997	Drive, She Said	
1998	Heart of the Sun	
2002	Long Life, Happiness & Prosperity	
2006	Hollow Man 2	
2008	Surveillance	
2008	Patiences	Short
2014	The Journey Home	
2014	Albert Karvonen: Philosophies on Life, Nature and Wildlife Filmmaking	
2015	The Little Deputy	Short
2016	A Street Cat Named Bob	
2017	Meditation Park	
2018	The Lie	
2019	Docking	Short
2024	Monica's News	

=== Television ===
Year	Title	Notes
1996	Two	Pilot
1996	Millennium	Pilot
1998	Mentors	
1999	Total Recall 2070	
1999	Strange World	Pilot
2000	The Virginian	TV film
2000	Dark Angel	Pilot
2001	Smallville	Pilot
2002	Haunted	Pilot
2003	Tarzan	Pilot
2003	Mob Princess	TV film
2004	Kat Plus One	TV film
2011	The Killing	Eight episodes
2013	Deception	Pilot
2013	Betrayal	Pilot
2018	The Beach House	TV film
