= Choose Me (short story collection) =

1999 short story collection by Evelyn Lau

- First edition cover
- Author: Evelyn Lau
- Publisher: Doubleday Canada
- Publication date: March 1, 1999
- ISBN: 978-0-385-25844-9

Choose Me is a collection of short stories by Canadian writer Evelyn Lau. It was first published by Doubleday Canada in 1999.

== Contents ==
- "Family" is about a woman who is sleeping with a married man. She stays as a visitor in his house while he and his wife are away, and goes through their things. While the primary theme of the story is sex, Choose Me has surprised readers with its "unflattering, often harsh, depictions of old men's bodies from the perspective of their young female lovers." The other themes of the story are lust, loneliness, age, and the Electra complex.
- "The Outing"
- "The Summer Place"
- "A Faithful Husband "
- "Suburbia"
- "In the Desert"
- "Blue Skies"
