= Ninth Floor =

2015 Canadian documentary film

- Directed by: Mina Shum
- Written by: Mina Shum
- Produced by: Selwyn Jacob
- Edited by: Carmen Pollard
- Music by: Brent Belke
- Production company: National Film Board
- Release date: September 10, 2015 (TIFF)
- Running time: 82 minutes
- Country: Canada
- Language: English

Ninth Floor is a 2015 National Film Board of Canada documentary film written and directed by Mina Shum about the 1969 Sir George Williams affair, a student occupation led by Black West Indian-born students to protest alleged racism at the Montreal university.

== Development ==
The film's producer, Selwyn Jacob, had long intended to make a film about the riot since his own university days when, as a student at the University of Alberta, Jacob had been impacted by the Montreal events—especially since one of the protestors had been from his own village in Trinidad.

In a 2015 interview on the NFB's blog, Jacob recalled the very first time he'd heard about the Montreal unrest:

I learned about the events in a curious way, through one of my professors in Edmonton. I’d invited him to various Caribbean student events, and we’d become good friends. Then one morning, he turned to me in class and said, “Well, I hope we’re still friends.” I was puzzled by the remark, and it was only later, when I heard the news from Montreal, that I understood where his comment was coming from.

Jacob remained interested in producing a film on the riot for decades. In 2010, he raised the idea again at a programming meeting of the NFB's Pacific & Yukon Studio in Vancouver. At the time, the studio had been considering a film adaption of a book about 1968 and Jacob believed the Sir George Williams Riot was "an interesting prism through which to look at that whole period in Canadian history." Though working on Mighty Jerome at the time, he started actively researching the project.

Jacob first raised the project with Mina Shum at the Whistler Film Festival, where she was on a documentary jury. She initially wasn't familiar with the riot but was immediately interested, and the two of them began a lengthy discussion about the project.

== Production ==
To make Ninth Floor, Shum combined archival footage and news clippings of the day with first-hand accounts from former student protesters such as Anne Cools, an archival interview with Rosie Douglas, and also spoke with others affected by the event— including the son of Perry Anderson, the professor who had been the initial focus of protests.

The film includes video footage from Concordia University's archives, transferred from the original reel-to-reel videotape, a now-obsolete format. Ninth Floor also makes use of archival images from Radio-Canada, CBC, CTV, Associated Press and the NFB’s own stockshot library.

== Release and reception ==
The film premiered at the 2015 Toronto International Film Festival. At the 2015 Vancouver International Film Festival, Shum won the Artistic Merit Award from Women in Film + Television Vancouver for Ninth Floor. In December 2015, the film was selected for TIFF's annual Canada's Top Ten screening series as one of the ten best Canadian feature films of the year.

== See also ==
- True North, another documentary film about the incident by Michèle Stephenson
