= The Diary of Evelyn Lau =

1994 film by Sturla Gunnarsson

- Based on: The Diary of Evelyn Lau by Evelyn Lau
- Screenplay by: Barry Stevens
- Directed by: Sturla Gunnarsson
- Starring: Sandra Oh; Harrison Liu; Yan Cui; Jay Brazeau; Eugene Lipinski
- Country of origin: Canada
- Original language: English

Production
- Producers: Maryke McEwen; Alex Pappas
- Editor: Jeff Warren
- Running time: 90 minutes

Original release
- Network: Canadian Broadcasting Corporation
- Release: 1994

The Diary of Evelyn Lau is a 1994 Canadian television film directed by Sturla Gunnarsson and starring Sandra Oh as Evelyn Lau, a teenager who battles with her family, runs away from home and becomes a drug-addicted prostitute, later writing a book about her experiences.

The film, shot in Vancouver, British Columbia, is based on Runaway: Diary of a Street Kid, a 1989 memoir by Canadian author Evelyn Lau. It first aired during prime time on Sunday March 13, 1994 and its controversial topic received a lot of media attention. Actress Sandra Oh won a 1994 Golden FIPA award for her lead performance in the film.

== Cast ==
- Sandra Oh as Evelyn Lau
- Harrison Liu as Mr. Lau
- Yan Cui as Mrs. Lau
- Cai Red as Kevin
- Jay Brazeau as Dr. Hightower
- Eugene Lipinski as Joe
- Don Thompson as Expo Drunk
- Nicholas Campbell as Man on Highway
- Martin Doyle as Management Consultant
- Jerry Wasserman as Man on Dock
- Kenneth Welsh as Larry
- Don S. Davis as Man at Book Launch
- Peter Trower as himself
