= Sir George Williams affair =

Canadian student occupation in 1969

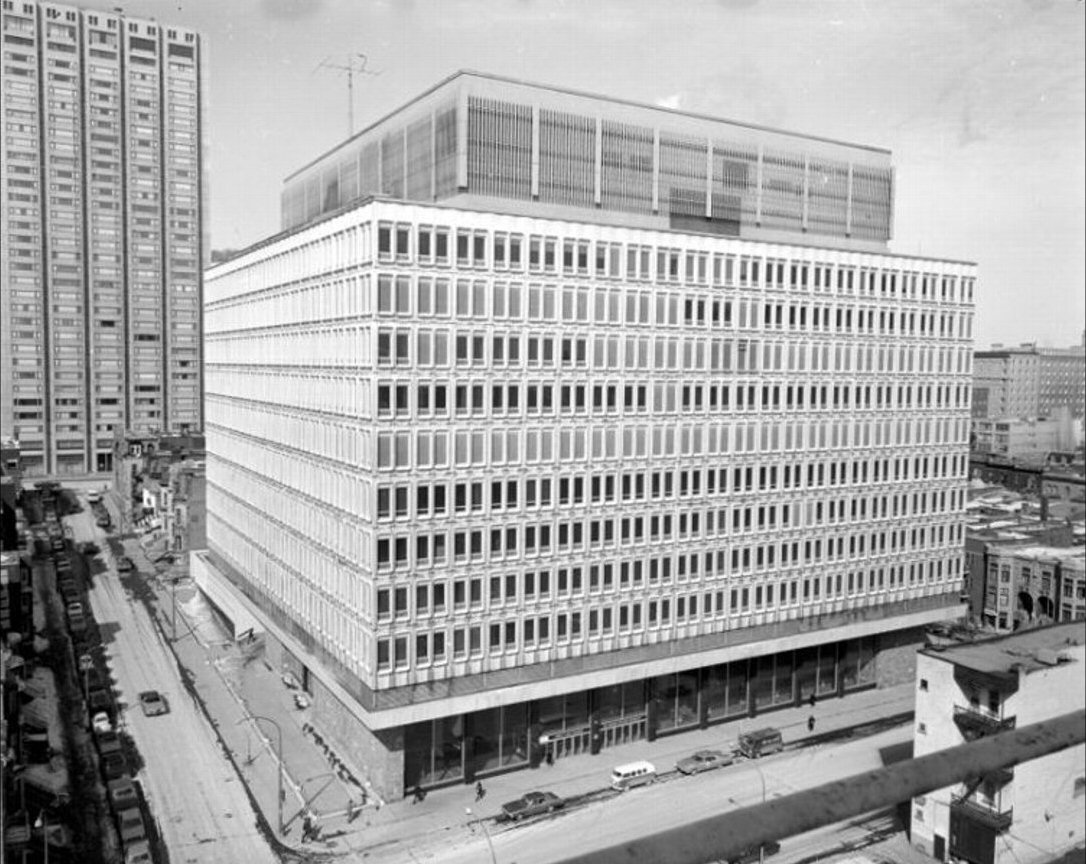
- The Henry F. Hall building in 1970
- Location: Montreal
- Date: January 29, 1969 (EST)
- Target: The Henry F. Hall Building

The Sir George Williams affair (also referred to as "The Sir George Williams Computer Centre Incident") was a 1969 event at Sir George Williams University in Montreal, Quebec, Canada, now a part of Concordia University. It was the largest student occupation in Canadian history, and resulted in $2 million of property damage.

== Background ==
In May 1968, six West Indian students of Sir George Williams University accused biology professor Perry Anderson of discrimination because of alleged unfair grading. No meetings were held to discuss the incident and to find a solution. Eight months later, students took matters into their own hands by organizing meetings, sit-ins and peaceful protests. Other events, at the university and in Montreal, contributed to the simmering crisis and its destructive conclusion.

In October 1968, a few months before the riot, Montreal had hosted two conferences on the position of black people in society. The first, at Sir George Williams, was organized by black alumni, several professors, and other members of the university. It engaged black organizations across Canada, who were represented by black leaders from Halifax to Vancouver. According to Expression, a quarterly publication of the Negro Citizenship Association Inc. (Conference Issue, Winter 1968), its purpose was to examine the "problems in the Canadian society with reference to black people." The second, the Black Writers Conference, was hosted at McGill University. Its focus was "the ideology of Black Power and Black Nationalism." These conferences, held weeks apart and at the two different venues, reflected formal agreements to disagree on priorities and span of action: domestic versus international. Both conferences contributed to the tensions at Sir George Williams University.

Other contributing factors included a series of miscommunications between the students and the university administration, and the nature of the university itself, which encouraged a non-traditional educational philosophy, openness, and accessible higher education to a wide range of students from different backgrounds and different social strata.

== Overview ==
In Montreal, the estimated population of black people was 7,000 in 1961, which increased to 50,000 by 1968. McGill University was the first choice of university for many students but, since they had a strict admission policy, they could not be easily accepted. Sir George Williams University had a more lenient admissions policy and accepted students from various backgrounds. Classes were offered during the day and night (evening), which was convenient for many students. Sir George Williams University was very popular among international students.

The occupation was sparked by the university's mishandling of racism allegations against assistant professor of biology Perry Anderson, who was accused of being biased in his grading of black students. In spring 1968, six black students from the West Indies accused Anderson of racism, charging that he had given them lower grades than what their work merited. One black student, Rawl Frederick, wrote a poem describing the atmosphere at Sir George Williams University. Entitled Man Trap, it read: "They designate institutions, we disintegrate in infernos, They consummate animals that abort us, Nursing grounds for dysgenic beasts, Developing ghettoes/employing social workers to create Negroes. Man-trap, I know your name, your face."

Rodney John, one of the six students who made the complaint against Anderson, recalled in a 2019 interview: "What made it even more farcical was the experience of Terrence (Ballantyne, another student). He had a White lab partner. Terrence handed in his lab. His lab gets 7 out of 10. His lab partner borrows Terrence’s lab and copies it word for word. The guy gets the lab back and guess what? He gets a higher mark and doesn’t get any marks deducted for being late. Just imagine you have 13 students each with their own stories. This was a pattern." Additionally, it was charged that in the classroom Anderson would address black students as "mister" while he addressed White students by their first names, which was widely seen as evidence that he was prejudiced against his black students. In September 1968, the complaints against Anderson of racial bias were denied by the university administration.

In general, the university administration had a patronizing and dismissive attitude towards the black students, taking the viewpoint that it was self-evident that Anderson was not a racist and the students complaining about him were just "whiners" unhappy with the failing grades that they had brought about themselves. When John asked to see the report clearing Anderson, he recalled: "When we asked to see a copy of the report, nobody had a copy. Eventually it was stated the report had been sent to the principal. So we went to his office. He didn’t have a copy of the report either. What was told to us was it got lost in the internal mail." All through fall 1968, there was a mounting mood of frustration and rage by the black students against a university administration that was indifferent to their concerns. On January 28, 1969, The Georgian, the student newspaper, ran a special edition accusing Anderson of racism, and the university administration of a cover-up. The issue of The Georgian galvanized the student community, most of whom had been previously unaware of the matter.

Beginning on January 29, 1969, over 400 students occupied the university's computer lab. Fed up with what they considered to be intransigence on the part of the administration, black and white students left a meeting and occupied the university computer lab on the ninth floor of the Henry F. Hall Building. Two of the leaders of the students were Roosevelt "Rosie" Douglas and Anne Cools. John stated: "We’re talking about an era of social change and development of a social consciousness. Many students were prepared to join the cause on that basis. At the height of the occupation you had anywhere from three to five hundred bodies involved. A great majority at that time were white students. But you also had black students who identified with the struggle. Racism was rampant in the community and the university was not insulated from that racism. And so you had a tremendous rippling effect."

Most of the occupation was quite peaceful: the police were not involved, and negotiations continued. On February 10, 1969, an agreement was reached under which the students would leave the Hall Building in exchange for a new committee to examine the allegations of prejudice against Anderson. However, most of the students refused to leave. The occupation continued until February 11, when negotiations broke down and riot police were called in to storm the Hall Building. After they learned that the university was planning to renege on the agreement, the remaining students began to barricade themselves in. The faculty of Sir George Williams University, siding with Anderson, vetoed the agreement to have a new committee appointed to examine the allegations of racial bias against black students. Instead, the administration asked the Montreal police to evict the students from the Hall Building.

As the police and the students fought in the halls, other students threw computer punch cards out of the windows, littering the streets above with thousands of punch cards. A fire broke out in the computer lab, forcing the occupiers out of the building; 97 of them were arrested. John accused the police of starting the fire: "The violence was perpetuated — I have no hesitation saying this — by the police and the administration. Are students going to start a fire when they’re locked in?"

As the building burned, the crowds watching the scene from below chanted, "Let the niggers burn!" and "Burn, niggers, burn!" As the students tried to escape from the burning building, they were arrested, subjected to racist insults and beaten savagely by the police. Once in custody, the 87 students were divided by race, with the 38 black students separated from the White students. The computer lab was destroyed, resulting in over $2 million in damage. The incident was recorded live by television crews, the most memorable image associated with the riot was smoke arising from the Hall Building while the streets were swamped with punch cards. Windows were broken and computer tapes and punch cards tossed onto the street below. The charges against most of the rioters were eventually dismissed. A total of 1,044 charges were brought by the Crown, of which only 50 were heard in court, nine were not held and 22 were dropped. The governor-general of Canada, Roland Michener, was touring the West Indies at the time. He was unable to give a speech at the St. Augustine campus of the University of the West Indies in Port of Spain, the capital of Trinidad and Tobago, as various radical students accused Canada of being a racist country. Public opinion in Canada was overwhelmingly against the students, who were denounced as "rampaging criminals," "thugs" and "anarchists." The man considered the leader of the protest, Kennedy Frederick of Grenada, was denied bail and brought to court in a cage as if he were an animal. The media blamed lax immigration laws that allowed "trouble-making" students from the West Indies to attend Canadian universities.

Among those arrested and convicted were Roosevelt Douglas, who later became Prime Minister of Dominica, and who was a son of one of the richest men in Dominica. Also arrested was Anne Cools, who later became a Canadian Senator. Deeply involved also was student Cheddi "Joey" Jagan Jr., who was of Indo-Guyanese and Ashkenazi Jewish descent, and the son of Cheddi Jagan, an American-educated dentist and former Premier and Chief Minister of British Guiana at the time, and his American wife Janet Jagan who was a nurse.

Some claim that the computer lab was not damaged, except for several million computer punch cards that were sent fluttering to the street below; but a Canadian Broadcast Corporation documentary shows smashed computer tape drives and extensive fire damage. The damage was listed in millions of dollars. It is unknown who caused the fire. The police accused the occupiers of the damages, while the occupiers accused the police of setting the fire as an easy way to get all the students out of the room without physically entering it. Other students claim that they saw police locking doors and exits that were normally open, and confiscating fire axes from students the day before the fire was set.

== Aftermath ==
The riot was covered extensively by the Canadian media: all of the television networks filmed the event live from outside the university. The occupation became a key event illustrating the widespread disaffection and rebelliousness among the nation's youth during the 1960s.

One protestor, Coralee Hutchison, suffered head trauma during the confrontation with police. She was hospitalized and later died.

Assistant professor Perry Anderson was suspended for the duration of the crisis. He was reinstated on February 12, 1969, and, on June 30, the Hearing Committee appointed to the case found that "there was nothing in the evidence (before them) to substantiate a general charge of racism." He was found not guilty of racism towards the six complainants.

The computer centre incident forced a number of changes at Sir George Williams University. Student representation on university decision-making bodies was established and university procedures and policies were revamped and modernized. In April 1971, Sir George Williams adopted the University Regulations on Rights and Responsibilities and established the Ombuds office.

The Sir George Williams affair also raised the question of racism in Canada. When the fire broke out during the destruction of the computer lab and many protesters were still in the building, some white passersby chanted "Let the niggers burn."

In 2022, the university issued an apology, stating that the crackdown on the protests "had serious lasting consequences for many individuals [...] from jail sentences to deportation, psychological trauma, physical injury, social alienation, loss of employment and the disruption of – even to the point of not finishing – academic degrees."

== Film ==
In February 2014, director Mina Shum and producer Selwyn Jacob began shooting in Montreal on a National Film Board of Canada feature documentary entitled Ninth Floor, about the Sir George Williams Affair. Filming coincided with the 45th anniversary of the incident. The film had its world premiere at the 2015 Toronto International Film Festival, on September 12. The film focuses on individuals who were connected to the incident, and how it shaped their lives. The film shows the events at the time, and follows up on the lives of those involved decades later.

In 2025, Michèle Stephenson released the documentary film True North on the affair.

== See also ==
- List of incidents of civil unrest in Canada

== Sources ==
- Forsythe, Dennis (1971). Let The Niggers Burn: The Sir George Williams Affair, and its Caribbean Aftermath. Black Rose Books. ISBN 0-919618-17-0.
- Palmer, Bryan (2009). Canada's 1960s: The Ironies of Identity in a Rebellious Era. Toronto: University of Toronto Press.
