= Mina Shum =

Canadian film director

- Shum in 2026
- Born: 1966 (age 59–60); Hong Kong
- Education: University of British Columbia (BA)
- Occupations: Filmmaker; director; writer

Chinese name
- Chinese: 沈小艾
- Hanyu Pinyin: Shěn Xiǎo'aì
- Yale Romanization: Sám Síu-ngaaih

Mina Shum (born 1966) is an independent Canadian filmmaker. She is a writer and director of award-winning feature films, numerous shorts and has created site-specific installations and theatre. Her features, Double Happiness and Long Life, Happiness & Prosperity both premiered in the US at the Sundance Film Festival and Double Happiness won the Wolfgang Staudte Prize for Best First Feature at the Berlin Film Festival and the Audience Award at Torino. She was the resident director at the Canadian Film Centre in Toronto. She was also a member of an alternative rock band called Playdoh Republic.

== Early life ==
Mina Shum was born in Hong Kong in 1966 and moved to Vancouver with her family at the age of one. Her family, who had originally left Maoist China, settled in Vancouver as part of the first wave of Chinese immigration. In her early school years, Shum was interested in acting and theatre, and decided to pursue these interests despite her parents' disapproval. Shum attended the University of British Columbia from 1983 to 1989 and received a B.A. in theatre as well as a Diploma in Film Production. At the age of 19, Shum decided that she wanted to be a filmmaker after watching a film by Peter Weir titled Gallipoli. From Gallipoli, she discovered that "one, you could make a film that wasn't American-centric as well as find an audience and two, you could marry beautiful visuals with a very intimate story." After receiving her degree, she was briefly part of the director's program at the Canadian Film Centre in Toronto.

Shum is also close friends with fellow filmmaker, Ann Marie Fleming, whom she met in 1989 while they were both students.

== Career ==
Although she is often pigeonholed as a "Chinese-Canadian woman film director", Shum prefers to be known as an "independent filmmaker", rather than one of national identity. She views this label as one way to get audiences to view her film without prejudice. When discussing her association with feminism and multiculturalism Shum says, "Because I'm a living breathing human being in Vancouver, which is a very multicultural city, and I'm a woman, I tend to get tagged as someone who might write about "issues." But that's not where it starts for me, it starts on a very human level. I use narrative to reveal things that people don't see."

Shum describes herself as being an enthusiastic consumer of ideas, movies, painting, theatre, music, dance, fiction, and non-fiction. When discussing her inspirations, she says, "I read interviews with people I've never heard of. And I listen to both friends and strangers speak. I live entirely, throw myself into situations, get my heart broken, soar with infatuations. And somehow all that gets funneled through my guiding intention, which is to reflect and reveal how we can be happier. How to live more authentically, how to make the most out of this one life."

=== Short films ===
Shum's first short film, Picture Perfect, is a 1989 release about a man obsessed with pornography and the effects of media on his personal life. The film is based on Shum's ex-boyfriend being a pornography addict and her experiences finding out about it. She ended up casting him in the lead role. Picture Perfect was nominated for "Best Short Drama" at the 1989 Yorkton Film Festival.

In 1993, Shum released a 20-minute documentary about her family titled, Me, Mom and Mona. The film is reminiscent of a television talk show surrounding the lives of three women. Through the duration of the film, the women discuss the complexities of familial history and the sometimes strained relationship with the patriarch of the family. The film was well-received and was given a special citation from the Best Canadian Short Film award jury at the 1993 Toronto International Film Festival.

Shum has written and directed several other short films, including: Shortchanged, Love In, Hunger, and Thirsty. Her most recent short film, titled, Hip Hop Mom, was released online in 2011 and has garnered thousands of hits.

=== Feature films ===
Shum has directed four feature-length films. Her first feature-length film, Double Happiness, was released in 1994, and stars Sandra Oh. Double Happiness is a semi-autobiographical film based on Shum's early experiences of leaving home as a teenager. The film is about an aspiring actress trying to assert her independence from the expectations of her Chinese Canadian family. Double Happiness won numerous awards, including the "Wolfgang Staudte Award" at the Berlin International Film Festival, the "Audience Award" at the Torino International Festival of Young Cinema, and "Best Canadian Feature Film" at the Toronto International Film Festival.

Shum's second feature film, Drive, She Said, premiered at the Toronto International Film Festival in 1997 and was in official competition at the Turin Delle Donne Film Festival. Drive, She Said, is about a woman who is willingly taken hostage by a bank robber and accompanies him cross-country to visit his ailing mother and her estranged family. Her third feature film, Long Life, Happiness & Prosperity was screened as part of the Canadian Perspective Program at the 2002 Toronto International Film Festival and at the 2003 Sundance Film Festival. The film is about a young girl who uses Taoist magic to help her mother's financial situation and love life.

In her three narrative feature films, Double Happiness, Drive, She Said, and Long Life, Happiness, and Prosperity, Shum uses a comedic approach to depict the Chinese Canadian family in multicultural Canada. She says that as a Chinese immigrant, she uses humour to characterize society in general. Shum's films often feature ironic, discontented young women who want to leave home for something better. In her films, Shum characterizes home as a place of conflict, boredom, and disappointment. Her depiction of familial negotiations ensures conflicts for her protagonists.

In February 2014, Shum began shooting in Montreal on a National Film Board of Canada feature documentary entitled Ninth Floor, about the Sir George Williams Affair student protest. Filming coincided with the 45th anniversary of the incident. Ninth Floor premiered at the 2015 Toronto International Film Festival. It deals with an incident in 1969 at Sir George Williams University (later merged into Concordia University) where students occupied a ninth-floor computer lab to protest the handling by school officials of a complaint about racial discrimination. At the 2015 Vancouver International Film Festival, Shum was awarded the Women in Film+Television Artistic Merit Award for Ninth Floor.

In 2026 she entered production on Whatcha Want, her first narrative feature film since Meditation Park. The film is slated to premiere at the 2026 Toronto International Film Festival.

== Filmography ==
- Picture Perfect (1989)
- Shortchanged (1990, short)
- Love In (1991, short)
- Hunger (1991, short)
- Me, Mom and Mona (1993, short)
- Double Happiness (1994)
- Drive, She Said (1997)
- Thirsty (199, short)
- You Are What You Eat (2001, installation)
- Bliss (2002, TV)
- Long Life, Happiness & Prosperity (2002)
- Mob Princess (2003, TV movie)
- The Shields Stories (2004, TV)
- Romeo! (2004, TV)
- Da Vinci's Inquest (2004, TV)
- Noah's Ark (2006, TV)
- Exes and Ohs (2007, TV)
- About a Girl (2007, TV)
- Hip Hop Mom (2011, short)
- All (2011, short)
- Ninth Floor (2015, documentary)
- Meditation Park (2017)
- Murdoch Mysteries 2019 & 2021 (TV)
- Frankie Drake Mysteries 2019 (TV)
- The Good Doctor. 2022 (TV)
- Whatcha Want, 2026

== Awards ==
- Nominated – "Best Short Film": Yorkton Film Festival
- "Best Canadian Short" – Special Jury Citation: Toronto International Film Festival 1993
- "Best Canadian Feature Film" – Special Jury Citation: Toronto International Film Festival 1994
- "Audience Award": Torino International Festival of Young Cinema 1994
- Nominated – "Best Achievement in Direction": Genie Awards 1994
- Nominated – "Best Original Screenplay": Genie Awards 1994
- "Wolfgang Staudte Award": Berlin Film Festival 1995
- "Best Canadian Screenplay – Special Mention": Vancouver International Film Festival
- Nominated – "DGC Craft Award" Directors Guild of Canada 2007
- Won – Artistic Merit Award, Women in Film and Television Vancouver, 2015: Vancouver International Film Festival

On 21 June 2016, she also received the "Finalé Artistic Achievement Award" from Women in Film + Television Vancouver, "which honours a screen-based media artist who has created an outstanding recent work or a significant body of work."
