= Anne Cools =

Canadian senator (born 1943)

The Honourable Anne Cools

Canadian Senator from Ontario (Toronto Centre-York)
- In office January 13, 1984 – August 12, 2018
- Nominated by: Pierre Trudeau
- Appointed by: Edward Schreyer

Personal details
- Born: Anne Clare Cools; August 12, 1943 (age 83) Barbados, British West Indies
- Party: Independent Senators Group (2016–2018)
- Other political affiliations: Liberal (1984–2004); Conservative (2004–2007); Non-affiliated (2007–2016)
- Spouse: Rolf Calhoun

Anne Clare Cools (born August 12, 1943) is a Canadian retired politician who was the longest serving member of the Senate of Canada, having served from 1984 to 2018. As a social worker, Cools was a pioneer in the protection of women from domestic violence, running one of the first domestic violence shelters in Canada.

== Personal life and education ==
Cools was born and raised in Barbados, as the daughter of pharmacist Lucius Unique Cools and Rosita Gordon Miller Cools, who owned a sugar plantation. Both her grandfather and an uncle were politically active on the island. When she was four years old, two of her siblings died. In Barbados, Cools attended Ursuline convent School. In 1957, when she was 13 years old, her family immigrated to Canada, where she studied at Thomas D'Arcy McGee High School in Montreal. Cools received a B.A. degree in social sciences, sociology and psychology from McGill University. Cools is married to business consultant Rolf Calhoun. Her personal interests include classical music and playing the piano.

=== Early career ===
Early in her career, Cools worked as a student coordinator, responsible for supervising students and training them to be social workers. She was employed by the University of Toronto, in the Faculty of Social Work from 1978-1978; by the Ryerson Polytechnic Institute (now Toronto Metropolitan University) from 1978 to 1980. She worked at Seneca College from 1977 to 1989.

== Advocacy ==
=== Racism ===
In February 1969, Cools participated in a 13 day long civil disobedience sit-in at Sir George Williams University (later Concordia University), where over 400 students occupied the computer center to protest the school's inadequate handling of complaints of racism against a professor. When the riot police stormed the building, some floors were set on fire, computers were destroyed and computer cards and paper rained down from the 9th floor onto the street below, where there was a counter-demonstration chanting "let the niggers burn". While Cools was nowhere near the 9th floor, she was one of 97 students arrested, and unlike most of them, Cools refused to plead guilty to be set free, instead, she served four months in jail. About the affair, she has said "it took me a long time to recover... it shocked me to my core". In 1981, she was granted a pardon by the National Parole Board of Canada.

=== Domestic violence ===
As a social worker, Cools was one of the pioneers in the protection of women from domestic abuse. In 1974, Cools moved to Toronto where she founded and served as the executive director for Women in Transition Inc., one of the first shelters for domestic violence victims in Canada. With a high demand for its services, Cools obtained funding for and opened a second shelter in 1987. She co-organized Canada's first domestic violence conference, Couples in Conflict.

Cools has presented evidence that men and women are equally capable of domestic violence and aggression, which is not a gendered characteristic, but a human pathology of intimacy. In January 2016, in a Canadaland audio podcast interview with Desmond Cole, Cools supported and cited the work of the English domestic violence pioneer and expert Erin Pizzey, when she claimed that women are equally violent as men in domestic violence conflicts.

=== Child custody ===
Cools is a strong advocate for children's rights, that they after divorce should have continuing relationships with both mothers and fathers, and the importance of fathers for the children's development. In the 1990s, Cools was instrumental in the creation of and served on the Senate/House Special Joint Committee on Child Custody and Access, which in December 1998 issued its report, For the Sake of the Children. A principal recommendation of this report was that following a relationship breakdown, shared parenting should be presumed to be in the best interests of the child. She was candid in her criticism of the Liberal government of Prime Minister Jean Chrétien when proposed legislation to be introduced in the House of Commons was shelved after intense lobbying by women's groups.

=== Feminism ===
While a strong advocate for women and domestic violence victims, she has also criticized certain aspects of the feminist movement, e.g. stating that "this feminism that has grown up suddenly in the last few years, where all virtue and goodness are stacked up on the side of women, and all evil and violence is stacked up on the side of men—well, human nature doesn't work that way."

=== Community outreach ===
In addition to her work as social worker, Cools was actively involved in several community organizations. She was a member of the Board of Directors of the Black Education Project, a volunteer-run organization created to address racial inequalities in Toronto's education system. She also served on the board of Black Theatre Canada, the Pauline McGibbon Cultural Centre, and the Social Planning Council of Metropolitan Toronto.

== Political career ==
=== National Parole Board ===
From 1980 to 1984, Cools served on the National Parole Board of Canada, which is the parole board for federal prisoners.

=== Canadian House of Commons ===
She twice sought election to the House of Commons of Canada as a candidate of the Liberal Party of Canada. She lost the Liberal nomination in a highly contested race against John Evans for the 1978 by-election in Rosedale. Her campaign for the nomination was documented in the National Film Board of Canada's 1979 film The Right Candidate for Rosedale. She ran again in 1979, and won the nomination but was defeated in both the 1979 and 1980 elections by Progressive Conservative candidate David Crombie.

=== Canadian Senate ===
In 1984, Cools was appointed to the Senate of Canada by governor general Edward Schreyer, on the recommendation of prime minister Pierre Trudeau, becoming the first Black Canadian in the Senate. She had designated herself as representing the Senate division of Toronto-Centre-York.

Cools became increasingly critical of the Liberal governments of Jean Chrétien and Paul Martin, and of same-sex marriage. On June 9, 2004, she announced that she was crossing the floor to join the Conservative Party of Canada.

In the fall of 2006, Cools was barred from her committee duties for the Conservative Party, after questioning a new government accountability bill. In 2007, Cools was ousted from the Conservative party group after accusing two fellow senators of having grabbed and assaulted her. She also mentioned that she had witnessed a senator hitting a child. She sat as a non-affiliated Senator from 2007 until 2017 when she joined the Independent Senators Group.

From the retirement of Lowell Murray on September 26, 2011, until her own retirement on August 12, 2018, Cools was the longest-serving member of the Senate. She is the first female black Senator in North America. With the retirement of Charlie Watt, Cools was the last Senator appointed by Pierre Trudeau remaining in the Senate.

== See also ==
- Canadian titles debate
- Lists of Canadian senators
- List of Ontario senators
- Ninth Floor, documentary about the 1969 sit-in
