= Media and American adolescent sexuality =

The relationship between media and American adolescent sexuality explores how media influences the sexual development of American teenagers and shapes its portrayal.

According to Sexual Teens, Sexual Media: Investigating Media's Influence on Adolescent Sexuality, teenagers can be divided into three different stages: early (ages 8–13 years), middle (ages 13–16 for girls, 14-17 for boys) and late (16 and older for girls, 17 and older for boys).

Each stage focuses on different aspects of cognitive, physical, social and psychological development. Although not all teens develop through adolescence at the same rate, the stages usually follow a specific pattern. For teens in the early stages of adolescence, they are in the beginning stages of puberty. In this stage of adolescence, relationships begin to become important as well as their physical appearance. Middle adolescence is characterized by independence from their family and increased activity with their peers. This is the stage in which sexual activity may begin to occur. The last stage of adolescence the teenager begins to feel more secure in their bodies and their sexual behavior. With those aspects of adolescence in mind, media can play an important role in how teen shape their views about sexuality.

The American Academy of Pediatrics has argued that media representations of sexuality may influence teen sexual behavior. However, some scholars have argued that such claims have been premature. Despite increasing amounts of sexual media, US government statistic state that teens have delayed the onset of sexual intercourse in recent years. According to journalism professor and media critic Jane Brown, the media is piquing teen interest in sex at ages younger than before. Brown argues that research has "found a direct relationship between the amount of sexual content children see and their level of sexual activity or their intentions to have sex in the future." However, the direction (and mechanism) of causality remains unclear.

== Sexuality in the media ==
Some scholars argue that media in the United States is the most sexually suggestive in the world. For example, the sexual messaging contained in film, television, and music are becoming more explicit in dialog, lyrics, and behavior, which can in-turn impact viewers. In addition, the messages may contain inaccurate information that misleads viewers. Some scholars argue that still-developing teens may be particularly vulnerable to media effects. A 2001 report found that teens rank the media second only to school sex education programs as a leading source of information about sex, but a 2004 report found that "the media far outranked parents or schools as the source of information about birth control."

Media often portrays an emotional side effects of sexuality and sexual feelings, such as guilt and disappointment, but less often the physical risks such as pregnancy or STDs that can be involved with it. According to a study done by Michael A Deaney, concerning how popular films depict STIs, it was found that out of 128 characters from 77 films, HIV was the most frequently featured Sexually Transmitted Infections (42 films, 54.5%).

Many television shows or films often do not depict the consequences for sexual behaviors. For example, only 10% of programs that contain sexual scenes include any warnings about the potential risks or responsibilities of having sex such as sexually transmitted diseases or teen pregnancy. In television programming aimed at teens, more than 90% of episodes had at least one sexual reference in it, with an average of 7.9 references per hour.

However, government statistics suggest that since 1991, both teen sex and teen pregnancy have declined dramatically despite the media generally become increasingly sexually explicit.

Teen pregnancy, also known as adolescent pregnancy, is when a woman under the age of 20 becomes pregnant. It can include girls as young as 10, but usually refers to teens between the ages of 15–19.

== Effects of the media on beliefs about sex ==
Some scholars feel that adolescents may turn to the media as a "sexual super peer" when they seek information about sexual norms and adult roles because of the lack of information about sexuality readily available to them. For example, in one study of 13- and 14-year-olds, heavy exposure to sexually oriented television also increased acceptance of nonmarital sex. Another study found that teens overestimate how many of their peers are sexually active, a problem that is contributed to by the media.

Another study found that middle-school-aged boys who watch music videos or pro-wrestling one day a week are 10% more likely to have a higher acceptance rate for rape than boys who do not watch any such content. Boys who watch music videos four days a week and pro wrestling 1.7 days a week (the mean exposure rate for boys) have 70% higher odds of endorsing a greater level of rape acceptance. "Both music videos and pro wrestling shows are popular with youth, combine violent and sexual content, and glorify individuals who behave violently."

== Effects of the media on sexual behavior ==
=== Pregnancy ===
Some researchers have found a correlation between the amount of television with high sexual content that teenagers watch and an increased likelihood of them becoming pregnant or fathering a child out of wedlock. Some studies suggest that teens exposed to the most sexual content on TV are twice as likely as teens watching less of such material to become pregnant before they reach age 20.

The researchers believe that reducing the amount of sexual content adolescents watch on television could substantially reduce the teen pregnancy rate. "It's a cumulative effect," Brown believes. "It's probably not any one portrayal that makes the difference, but it's a consistent, and now unhealthy, sexual script that adolescents do see as a depiction of appropriate behavior."

Several other studies have found that television viewing can influence multiple aspects of reproductive health among teenagers and that "earlier sexual initiation is associated with negative health outcomes." Previous research has suggested two different ways in which glamorized perceptions of sex may contribute to teen pregnancy; first by encouraging teens to become sexually active early in their adolescence and second by promoting inconsistent use of contraceptives.

=== Early sexual activity ===
Some studies have also found that adolescents whose media diet was rich in sexual content were more than twice as likely as others to have had sex when they were 16. In a Kaiser Family Foundation study, 76 percent of teens said that one reason young people have sex is that TV shows and movies make it seem normal for teens. In addition to higher likelihoods that an adolescent exposed to sexual content in the media will engage in sexual behaviors, they also are more likely to intend to have sex in the future and to have more positive expectations of sex.

Some studies suggest that children who watch adult content on television are more likely to have sex earlier once they reach adolescence. For every hour of adult-targeted television or movies watched by children when they were 6 to 8 years old, there was a 33% increased risk of becoming sexually active in early adolescence.

"Children have neither the life experience nor the brain development to fully differentiate between a reality they are moving toward and a fiction meant solely to entertain," explained David Bickham, a staff scientist in the Center on Media and Child Health. "Children learn from the media, and when they watch media with sexual references and innuendos, our research suggests they are more likely to engage in sexual activity earlier in life."

Other research has suggested that linking sexuality in media with adolescent sexual behavior is premature. Steinberg and Monahan reanalyzed a dataset of teen sexual behavior (Collins et al.) by using propensity score matching and discovered that with other risk factors controlled, the viewing of sexual media did not predict early onset of sexual behavior in adolescents. The authors concluded that links between media viewing and adolescent sexuality are more tenuous than previously believed.

Researchers on both sides of the debate acknowledge that assigning causality to correlations between media use and sexual behavior are difficult because of the lack of experimental research, and difficulty controlling for all potential confounding variables.

One study found that the relationship between exposure to sexual contact in the media and increased sexual activity among adolescents was more pronounced in white youths than black youths. Black teens are more likely to be influenced by their friends' sexual experiences and by their parents' expectations than by what they see in the media.

== Pornography ==
=== Epidemiology studies on the exposure of pornography on American adolescents ===
Individuals who are already at risk of being attracted to sexual aggression are more likely to be influenced by pornographic exposure. That in turn explains that such individuals are more likely to believe in the various unusual sexual behaviors as common, which causes negative effects towards sexual experiences. However, it is important that once the negative attitudes have been formed, it was not easily reversed by education.

Adolescent exposure to pornography is divided into two different sections: unintentional exposure and intentional exposure. The unintentional exposure rate for US adolescents was found to be from 19% to 32% from 2007 to 2013. Intentional pornography adolescent viewers from 10 to 17 years old take up 34% of the population at that age range. In 2012, in a study among 1000 adolescents, 66% of males and 39% of females have reported that they have been exposed to pornography. Between grades 3 and 10, more than 90% of children will be exposed to pornography. Psychiatrist Jerald says that access, affordability, and anonymity have made online sexual activity "extraordinarily common" among all ages, including adolescents. Older youth are more likely than younger youth to seek porn.

=== Accessibility to pornography for adolescents ===
With the development of technology, even with the help of parental control, teenagers still find their ways to get access to the "blocked content". The most common ways are exploiting the use of the Internet of things (IoT) to connect to different devices, stealing their parent passwords, hacking the router, factory-resetting their devices, using Virtual Private Network (VPN), and bypassing filter servers by using different a domain name service (DNS). Adolescents who have their devices surveillance by parental control often feel that their privacy has been invaded by their parents. However, the level of information secrecy is inversely proportional to the privacy invasion behavior, followed by the Simpson's paradox. The relationship conflict between parents who apply parental control with no clear set rules is found.

=== The influence of pornography on adolescents ===
==== Early sexual engagement ====
Exposure to sexual media can be a predictor of early sexual engagement, which includes unsafe sex practices and having multiple sexual partners. The likelihood of sexual engagement in adolescents correlates to the number of times they have been exposed to sexual media.

==== Sexual aggression ====
Sexual fetishism is a very common category in porn. The number of porn fetish clips has been increasing every year. In 2014, the estimation of fetish clips reached 80,000 clips per month. Adolescents who encounter these types of videos are likely to develop sexual aggression later in life. Other findings also show that 61% of serial killers are pornography collectors. Another study shows that pornography consumption and sexual fantasy deviants that cause sadism lead to the likelihood that individuals will commit a sexual offense.

==== Behaviors and attitudes alternation ====
In 2018, a study was done by Taylor Kohut to experiment on the wellness of adolescents who have been exposed to pornography. Female adolescents who had been exposed to pornography were found to have unregulated mood and self-evaluation. The viewing of pornography at an early age also affects relationships in adult life. One of the behaviors established from watching porn is known as undisclosed behavior, it relates to keeping secrets away from the other. As a result, studies have shown that relationship satisfaction between both partners is decreased. Results can lead to tension and distress in both partners.

==== Conceptualized distortion ====
Watching pornography can create an unhealthy image of body ideals. Research also shows that men who watch pornography are less satisfied with their sexual life. The decrement of pornography consumption can help individuals increase their self-confidence. Body-shaming affects men and women differently after being reinforced by pornography. Males consider their sexual performance, and females consider their body image to match the performance. Since that adolescents have less experience with their partners, they are more likely to be distorted by the pornographic image of human sexuality. In intense cases, it can develop into sexual aggression.

==== Performing such research ====
Although some literature exists on traditional forms of media (e.g., television, radio, magazines), the empirical research that examines the impact on children of exposure to non-violent sexual material is extremely limited.

— National Academy of Sciences, Youth, Pornography, and the Internet, 2002

The Journal of Adolescence concluded in 2019 that the adolescent brain may be more sensitive to sexually explicit material, but due to a lack of empirical research, no firm conclusions can be drawn.

There are considerable ethical problems with performing some kinds of research on the effects of pornography on minors. For example, Rory Reid (UCLA) declared, "Universities don't want their name on the front page of a newspaper for an unethical studies exposing minors to porn."

== See also ==
- Sexual norm
