= Double Happiness (film) =

- Promotional movie poster
- Directed by: Mina Shum
- Written by: Mina Shum
- Produced by: Stephen Hegyes; Rose Lam
- Starring: Sandra Oh; Callum Keith Rennie
- Cinematography: Peter Wunstorf
- Edited by: Alison Grace
- Music by: Shadowy Men on a Shadowy Planet; Mina Shum; Harley McCanley
- Distributed by: Fine Line Features
- Release dates: September 7, 1994 (TIFF); July 28, 1995 (U.S.)
- Running time: 87 minutes
- Country: Canada
- Languages: English; Cantonese
- Box office: $759,393 (U.S.)

Double Happiness is a 1994 Canadian drama film directed by Mina Shum, co-produced by the National Film Board of Canada. The film stars Sandra Oh as Jade Li, an actress struggling to assert her independence from the expectations of her Chinese Canadian family. Callum Keith Rennie also stars as Mark, Jade's love interest.

The film was the first feature directed by a Chinese Canadian woman to be given a wide release. It was also one of Oh's earliest performances; she received critical acclaim for her performance, and won the Genie Award for Best Performance by an Actress in a Leading Role for the film.

== Plot ==
Jade Li is a witty Chinese-Canadian aspiring actress who lives at home with her traditional Chinese family, which includes her strict father, her dutiful mother, and younger sister Pearl. Jade and Pearl's older brother, Winston, has been disowned—a fate Jade is not eager to share, both for her own sake and to spare her family pain.

Her family tries to put on the perfect public persona at all costs so as to maintain their dignity as well as uphold their traditional Chinese values. One primary part of this persona is prosperity. Jade's father hopes that true financial prosperity will become reality through penny stocks. Jade, meanwhile, tries to achieve that happy medium between giving in to her parents' wishes and fulfilling her own needs and desires - double happiness. Therefore, although she manages to land a few bit parts on camera, Jade spends most of her time working in the shop owned by a family friend, performing the duties of a respectful daughter and suffering through arranged dates with prosperous young Chinese men (Including one who is gay). An adept cultural chameleon, though, she also leads a double life, hanging out with best friend Lisa.

While Jade is hanging out with her friend Lisa, she teases her about her boyfriend’s affinity with Asian decor exclaiming “Lisa, another rice king.”. Lisa laughs pivoting to how she wants to move out to which Jade scoffs at. Later on that night, while out with Lisa, Jade ends up cast aside by the bouncer. She is dismayed as a guy named Mark attempts to flirt with her. She soon finds his attempts amusing asking him if he wants to take her home. They sleep together.

The next morning, Jade leaves before Mark awakens to prevent her parents from discovering she was out all night. Unfortunately, her car breaks down requiring a tow causing her parents to discover her absence anyway. Her dad berates her, calling her irresponsible and restricting her to a curfew. She attempts to explain but is rebuffed. Her sister warns her to be more cautious, reflecting on Winston’s absence. Pearl asks Jade to help her change a grade on her report card from a ‘C’ to an ‘A’. She asks Jade if this is considered lying to which Jade replies “Then tell the truth.”

The next day, Lisa stops by the shop confronting Jade on her true feelings about her family’s oppressive grip. To which Jade gives no answer. Shortly after, her father's childhood friend, Ah Hong, arrives for a visit. Jade soon feels the pressure to juggle her competing identities even more carefully than usual, lest her choice of professions—and boyfriends—shame her father. Because of its instability, Jade's parents don't understand or widely publicize Jade's aspirations to be an actress. They ask her to lie about her profession as well as her father’s in order to impress his friend for the remainder of the visit. During this time, Jade continues seeing Mark in secret.

Their main want for Jade is to date and marry a nice Chinese boy, a goal for which Jade's extended family also strives as they are always trying to introduce her to Chinese boys. Initially, they believe that the boy is Andrew, with whom Jade even agrees to go out.

While on the date, Andrew reveals he is gay to a relieved Jade as he describes hiding his identity and managing to only be set up once a year. But Jade, beyond wanting to be an actress, wishes her family had more western sensibilities when it came to dating.

The next day she meets with Mark for a date. As he’s dropping Jade off they are caught kissing on the porch in front of her family and Ah Hong. Her dad is horrified that she is secretly dating a caucasian man and orders the family to move wordlessly inside the house abandoning the groceries. Mark peels away after witnessing the scene. Jade meets with Mark shortly after to tell him she can no longer see him. Mark is devastated but Jade maintains her commitment is to her family.

Jade auditions for a newscaster role but is turned down for not being Filipino. However, the casting director is impressed with her acting abilities and recommends her for a role by a Hong Kong film company. They are disappointed in Jade with the audition as she is unable to read the scripts which are only in Cantonese. The casting director berates her leaving her speechless.

Some time after, Jade catches Ah Hong on the phone with his secret family. He confides in Jade of an affair he had with a much younger maid resulting in a child. He confesses he is exhausted having to live this way. He laments on about the burden of living a double life and advises Jade that she would have to choose a path soon. The pressure soon comes to a head for Jade at a family dinner. As everyone is going around reflecting on memories, Jade tells the story of the time she was meeting her father again upon his return to America. She reflects stating “Do you need me dad?” He ignores her as Ah Hong chastises her father telling him “You’re supposed to tell her you need her.” After this scene, Jade states she is moving out as her father disapprovingly tells her to go. Jade moves out shortly after, with her father telling her to leave the house key, stating she wouldn’t need it anymore.

Jade sits in her new apartment, making a phone call to Mark confirming their hang out. She begins unpacking, hanging her makeshift curtains, hopeful for her future.

== Cast ==
- Sandra Oh as Jade Li
- Stephen Chang as Dad Li (Lead) (as Stephen M.D. Chang)
- Alannah Ong as Mom Li
- Frances You as Pearl Li
- Johnny Mah as Andrew Chau
- Callum Keith Rennie as Mark
- Claudette Carracedo as Lisa Chan
- Greg Chen as Uncle Bing
- Mimi Mok as Mrs. Mar
- Lesley Ewen as Carmen the Casting Director
- Donald Fong as Ah Hong
- Nathan Fong as Dr. Ming Chu/Bartender
- Dennis Foon as Director
- Tosca Chin Wah Leong as Linda Taylor Wong, Ch. 4 News
- Estelle Coppens as Lead Woman in Scene with Jade
- Kevin Kelly as Lead Man in Scene with Jade
- Gene Kiniski as Man at Bus Stop

== Critical reception ==
On review aggregate website Rotten Tomatoes, Double Happiness has an approval rating of 73% based on 11 reviews.

Film critic Roger Ebert gave the film 3 out of 4 stars and wrote director Mina Shum "establishes a chatty, confiding tone right at the top and follows through, like a long letter from a good friend. By the end, she has told a story that has been told uncounted times for centuries on this continent, which was settled by people who left home and yet tried to bring it with them. What she brings to it is sweetness and style, and she gets a warm performance from Sandra Oh". Marjorie Baumgarten of The Austin Chronicle wrote the film "comes as close to the expression of multiculturalism as anything I've seen in a long time" and added, "As Jade, actress Sandra Oh gives a rich performance that conveys a satisfying sense of the character's dilemmas, passions, cheekiness, and talent." Baumgarten gave the film 4 out of 5 stars and concluded, "Everywhere one turns in Double Happiness there is evidence of cultural differences and cognitive dissonance. The triumph of Double Happiness is in hearing laughter and sweetness in the sounds of dissonance."

== Awards and nominations ==
Year	Award	Category	Recipient	Result
1994	Genie Awards	Best Motion Picture	Double Happiness	Nominated
1994	Genie Awards	Best Direction	Mina Shum	Nominated
1994	Genie Awards	Best Actress in a Leading Role	Sandra Oh	Won
1994	Genie Awards	Best Actor in a Supporting Role	Callum Keith Rennie	Nominated
1994	Genie Awards	Best Original Screenplay	Mina Shum	Nominated
1994	Genie Awards	Best Cinematography	Peter Wunstorf	Nominated
1994	Genie Awards	Best Editing	Alison Grace	Won
