= Sandra Oh =

Canadian and American actress (born 1971)

Sandra Oh OC
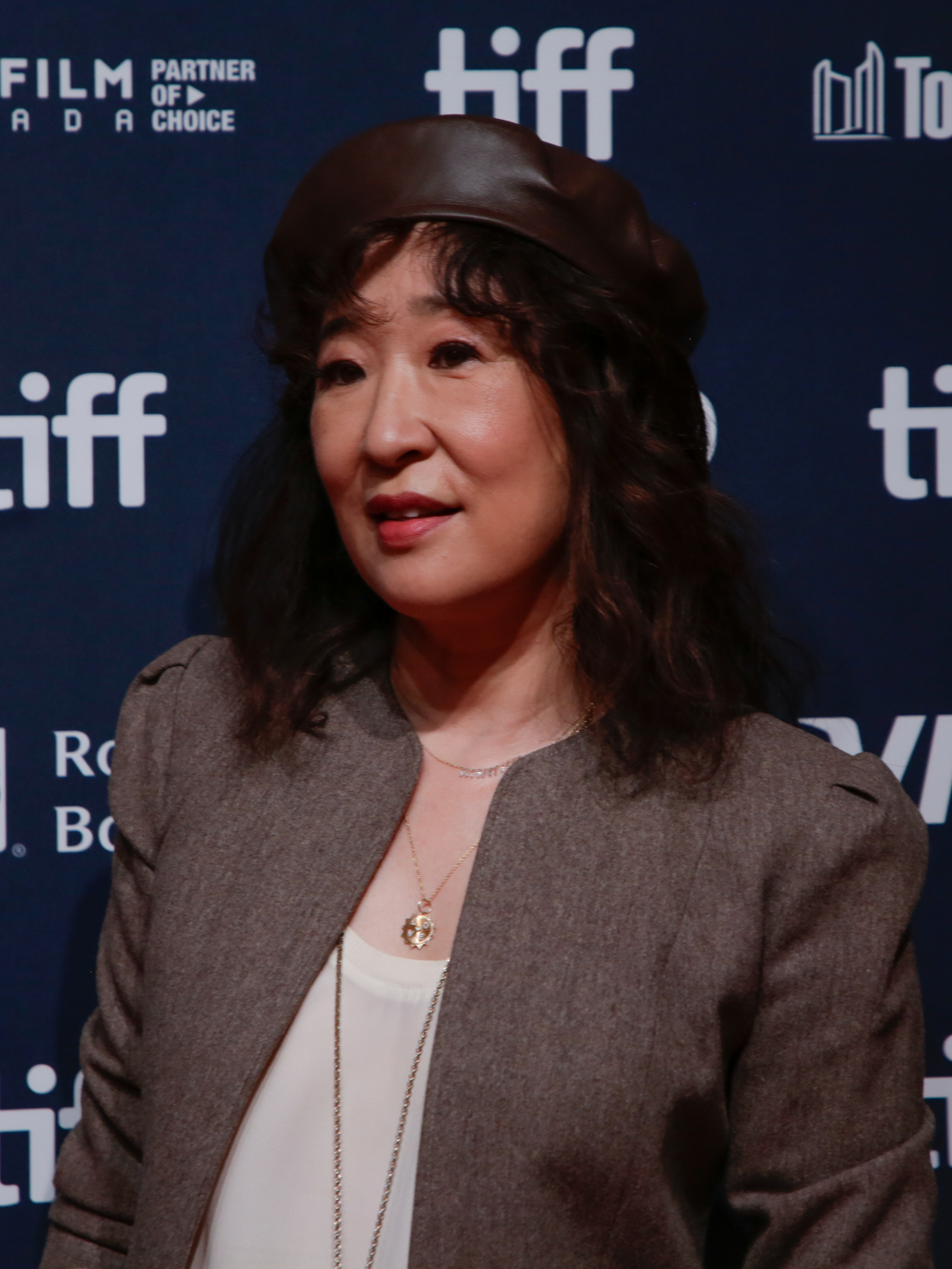
- Oh in 2024
- Born: Sandra Miju Oh; July 20, 1971 (age 55); Nepean, Ontario, Canada
- Citizenship: Canada; United States (since 2018)
- Education: National Theatre School
- Occupation: Actress
- Years active: 1989–present
- Spouse: Alexander Payne (m. 2003; div. 2006)
- Awards: Full list

Sandra Miju Oh OC (born July 20, 1971) is a Canadian and American actress. She is best known as Rita Wu in Arliss (1996–2002), Dr. Cristina Yang in Grey's Anatomy (2005–2014), and Eve Polastri in Killing Eve (2018–2022). She has received several awards including one Primetime Emmy Award from 14 nominations, as well as two Golden Globe Awards and four Screen Actors Guild Awards. In 2019, Time magazine named Oh one of the 100 most influential people in the world.

Oh first gained recognition for her roles in the Canadian films Double Happiness (1994) and The Diary of Evelyn Lau (1994), where she won Genie Awards for both films. Her later television credits include Judging Amy and American Crime, as well as voice roles on American Dad!, American Dragon: Jake Long, The Proud Family, Phineas and Ferb, Chop Socky Chooks, She-Ra and the Princesses of Power, and Invincible. In 2021, she played the lead role in the Netflix comedy drama series The Chair and was also one of the executive producers of the series.

She has had notable leading performances in films such as Last Night (1998), Long Life, Happiness & Prosperity (2002), Wilby Wonderful (2004), Catfight (2016), Meditation Park (2017), and Quiz Lady (2023). She has also taken supporting roles in Bean (1997), The Princess Diaries (2001), Under the Tuscan Sun (2003), Sideways (2004), Hard Candy (2005), Rabbit Hole (2010), and Tammy (2014). She voiced roles in the animated films Mulan II (2004), Over the Moon (2020), Raya and the Last Dragon (2021) and Turning Red (2022).

She hosted the 28th Genie Awards in 2008, and became the first woman of Asian descent to host the Golden Globe Awards at the 76th ceremony in 2019. In March 2019, she became the first Asian-Canadian woman to host Saturday Night Live, and was the third actress of Asian descent to do so, after Lucy Liu in 2000 and Awkwafina in 2018. She was also the first actress of Asian descent to be nominated for the Primetime Emmy Award for Outstanding Lead Actress in a Drama Series and the first woman of Asian descent to win two Golden Globes.

== Early life ==
Sandra Miju Oh was born in Nepean, Ontario, on July 20, 1971, to middle-class South Korean immigrants Oh Young-nam, a biochemist, and Oh Jun-su (John), a businessperson. Her parents had moved to the area in the early 1960s. She has a brother, Ray, and a sister, Grace, and grew up in a Christian household, living on Camwood Crescent in Nepean, where she began practicing ballet at age four to correct her pigeon toed stance. She took up acting at the age of 10. Growing up, Oh was one of the few youths of Asian descent in Nepean.

At age ten, Oh played The Wizard of Woe in a class musical called The Canada Goose. Later, at Sir Robert Borden High School, she founded the environmental club BASE (Borden Active Students for the Environment), leading a campaign against the use of styrofoam cups. While in high school, she was elected student council president. She also played the flute and continued both her ballet training and acting studies, though she knew that she "was not good enough to be a professional dancer" and eventually focused on acting. She took drama classes, acted in school plays, and joined the drama club, where she took part in the Canadian Improv Games and Skit Row High, a comedy group. Against her parents' advice, she rejected a four-year journalism scholarship to Carleton University to study drama at the National Theatre School of Canada in Montreal, paying her own way.

Oh told her parents that she would try acting for a few years, and promised to return to university if it failed. Reflecting on forgoing university, she has said that she is "the only person in [her] family who doesn't have a master's in something". Oh would later receive an honorary doctorate from Dartmouth College and deliver the commencement address in 2025. Soon after graduating from the National Theatre School in 1993, she starred in a stage production of David Mamet's Oleanna in London, Ontario. Around the same time, she won roles in biographical television films of two significant female Chinese-Canadians: as Vancouver author Evelyn Lau in The Diary of Evelyn Lau, where she won the role over more than 1,000 others who auditioned, and as Adrienne Clarkson in a CBC biopic of Clarkson's life.

== Career ==
=== 1994–2004: Early work ===
Oh came to prominence in her home country for her lead performance in the Canadian film Double Happiness (1994), playing Jade Li, a twenty-something Chinese-Canadian woman negotiating her wishes and those of her parents. The film received critical acclaim, with Roger Ebert praising Oh's "warm performance". Janet Maslin of The New York Times also praised her performance, saying: "Ms. Oh's performance makes Jade a smart, spiky heroine you won't soon forget." Oh won the Genie Award for Best Actress for the role. In 1995 she appeared in the Canadian film Little Criminals with a multi-scene, but uncredited, performance.

In 1997, she appeared in the film Bean, playing the supporting role of Bernice, the art gallery PR manager. Her other Canadian films include Long Life, Happiness & Prosperity and Last Night (1998), for which she again won a Best Actress Genie. She was cast in the drama Dancing at the Blue Iguana (2000), playing a stripper at a gentlemen's club opposite Daryl Hannah. The film received mediocre reviews, though Oh was praised for her performance. The New York Times review said, "Oh make[s] the most of [her] opportunity to explore the vulnerability below [her] characters' hard-edged surface." The same year, she appeared in the drama Waking the Dead. In 2002, Oh appeared in the family comedy Big Fat Liar, followed by a minor role in Steven Soderbergh's Full Frontal (2002).

Oh garnered critical acclaim for her seven seasons as Rita Wu, the assistant to the president of a major sports agency, on the HBO series Arliss, receiving a nomination for an NAACP Image Award for Best Supporting Actress in a Comedy Series and a Cable Ace award for Best Actress in a Comedy for her work. She also made several guest appearances on the series Popular (1999) playing a humanities teacher and guest starred in the television series Kung Fu: The Legend Continues, Judging Amy, Six Feet Under and Odd Job Jack.

In theatre, Oh has also starred in the world premieres of Jessica Hagedorn's Dogeaters at the La Jolla Playhouse and Diana Son's Stop Kiss at Joseph Papp's Public Theater in New York City.

In 2003, she was cast in a supporting role opposite Diane Lane in Under the Tuscan Sun, followed by a supporting role in Alexander Payne's drama Sideways (2004). She considers Sideways and The Diary of Evelyn Lau to be the two best films she has made.

=== 2005–2013: Grey's Anatomy ===
In 2005, Oh appeared in several films, including David Slade's thriller Hard Candy; and the independent anthology drama 3 Needles (2005), opposite Chloë Sevigny and Olympia Dukakis, in which she plays a Catholic nun in an AIDS-stricken African village. The same year, Oh was cast as Cristina Yang in the first season of what became the hit ABC medical series Grey's Anatomy. Oh's role on the show earned her both a 2005 Golden Globe Award for Best Supporting Actress in a Series and a 2006 Screen Actors Guild Award for Outstanding Performance by a Female Actor in a Drama Series. In July 2009, she received her fifth consecutive Primetime Emmy Award nomination as Best Supporting Actress in a Drama for her work on the series.

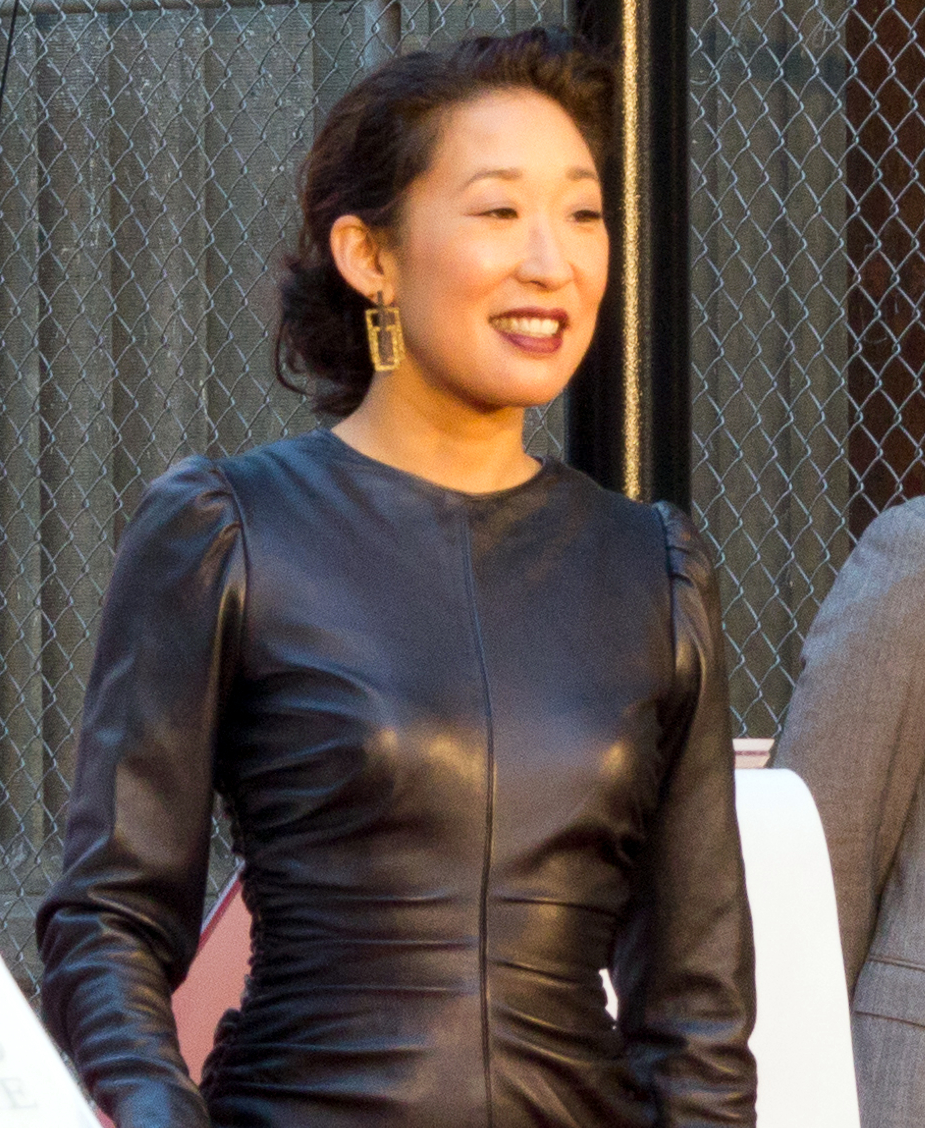
Oh at the presentation of her star on Canada's Walk of Fame in 2011

In addition to her work on Grey's Anatomy, Oh continued to appear in films. She co-starred in the thriller The Night Listener (2006), alongside Robin Williams and Toni Collette; in the superhero comedy Defendor (2009); Ramona and Beezus (2010); and in the critically acclaimed drama Rabbit Hole (2010), opposite Nicole Kidman and Aaron Eckhart.

In her only audiobook, she played Brigid O'Shaughnessy in a Grammy-nominated dramatization of The Maltese Falcon (2008), which also featured Michael Madsen and Edward Herrmann. She also has done a few voice roles in animation, including a few guest appearances in American Dragon: Jake Long, the voice of Princess Ting-Ting in Mulan II, and the voice of Doofah in The Land Before Time XIII: The Wisdom of Friends.

Oh was the host of the 28th Genie Awards on March 3, 2008. In 2009, Oh performed in The People Speak, a documentary feature film that uses dramatic and musical performances of the letters, diaries, and speeches of everyday Americans, based on historian Howard Zinn's A People's History of the United States. During the off-season hiatus from filming Grey's Anatomy in 2010, Oh took the part of Sarah Chen in the British crime drama, Thorne. She undertook intensive dialect coaching in order to play her British character.

On June 28, 2011, it was announced that Oh would receive a star on Canada's Walk of Fame; she was inducted on October 1 at Elgin Theatre in Toronto. In 2013, Oh formally announced that she would be leaving Grey's Anatomy at the end of the tenth season. Oh exited the series with the season 10 finale.

=== 2014–present: Film roles and Killing Eve ===
In October 2014, Oh announced that she would be teaming up with Canadian director Ann Marie Fleming to collaborate on an animated feature film titled Window Horses. She also appeared in a supporting role in the comedy film Tammy (2014), playing the wife of Kathy Bates' character.

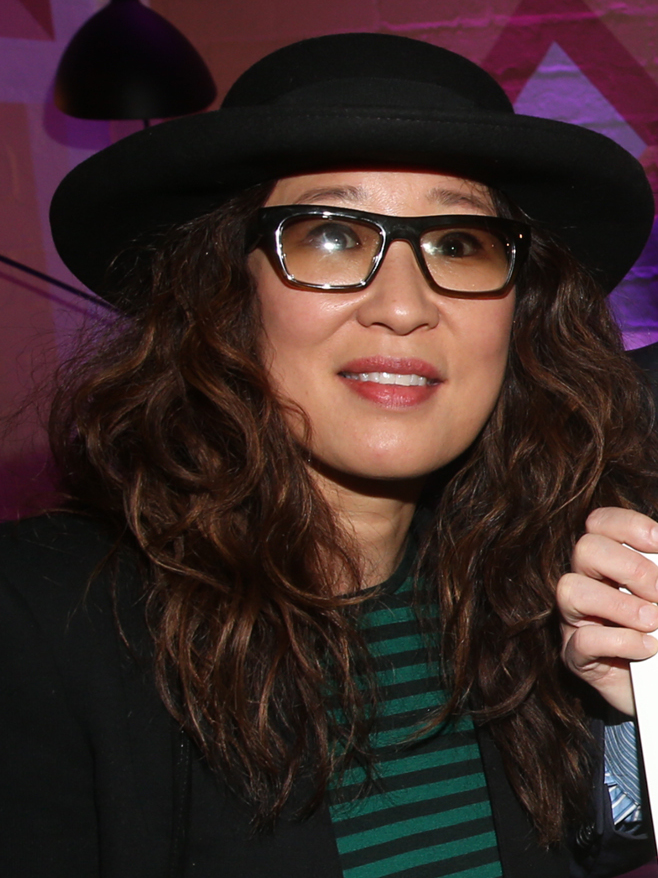
Oh in 2016

In 2015, she starred on the Refinery29 comedy web series Shitty Boyfriends. Oh began filming the comedy film, Catfight (2016), in New York City in December 2015. In 2017, Oh starred as Abby Tanaka in the third season of the anthology drama series American Crime.

Beginning in April 2018, Oh began a leading role in the BBC America and BBC Three spy thriller series Killing Eve, playing British intelligence agent Eve Polastri whose quarry is psychopathic assassin Villanelle (played by Jodie Comer), with the two women developing a mutual fascination. Upon reading the series script, Oh did not realize she was being considered for a leading role, stating that she had been "brainwashed" by years of being typecast as the leads' best friend. The series was renewed for a second season ahead of its debut, and a third was announced less than a day after the second premiered in the United States. Killing Eve was also renewed for a fourth season shortly after.

Oh has garnered critical acclaim for her performance on the series, with Jenna Scherer describing her in Rolling Stone as "a compulsively watchable actor – expressive and complex, blending wry wit and deep pathos." When Vulture declared Oh the best actress currently on television, critic Matt Zoller Seitz wrote: "It's a tour de force performance, yet so self-effacing and invisible in its effects that you come away thinking that you've seen a crackling yarn with compelling characters rather than a cultural landmark. This is a magic trick of a high order." In 2018, Oh became the first actress of Asian descent to be nominated for the Primetime Emmy Award for Outstanding Lead Actress in a Drama Series, for that role. She won the Golden Globe Award for Best Actress – Television Series Drama, becoming the first woman of Asian descent to win two Golden Globe Awards. Oh won Outstanding Performance by a Female Actor in a Drama Series at the SAG Awards in 2019.

From 2018 to 2020, Oh voiced the role of Castaspella in the animated superhero series She-Ra and the Princesses of Power. In 2019, she co-hosted the 76th Golden Globe Awards, alongside Andy Samberg. Oh became the first woman of Asian descent to host the awards show. In March 2019, she became the first Asian-Canadian woman to host Saturday Night Live, and only the third actress of Asian descent, after Lucy Liu in 2000 and Awkwafina in 2018. In 2021, Oh voiced Virana, the chieftess of the Fang tribe in the Disney animated film Raya and the Last Dragon.

Oh voices the role of Debbie Grayson in the animated superhero drama series Invincible. The series, based on the comic book series of the same name, premiered on Amazon Prime Video in 2021.

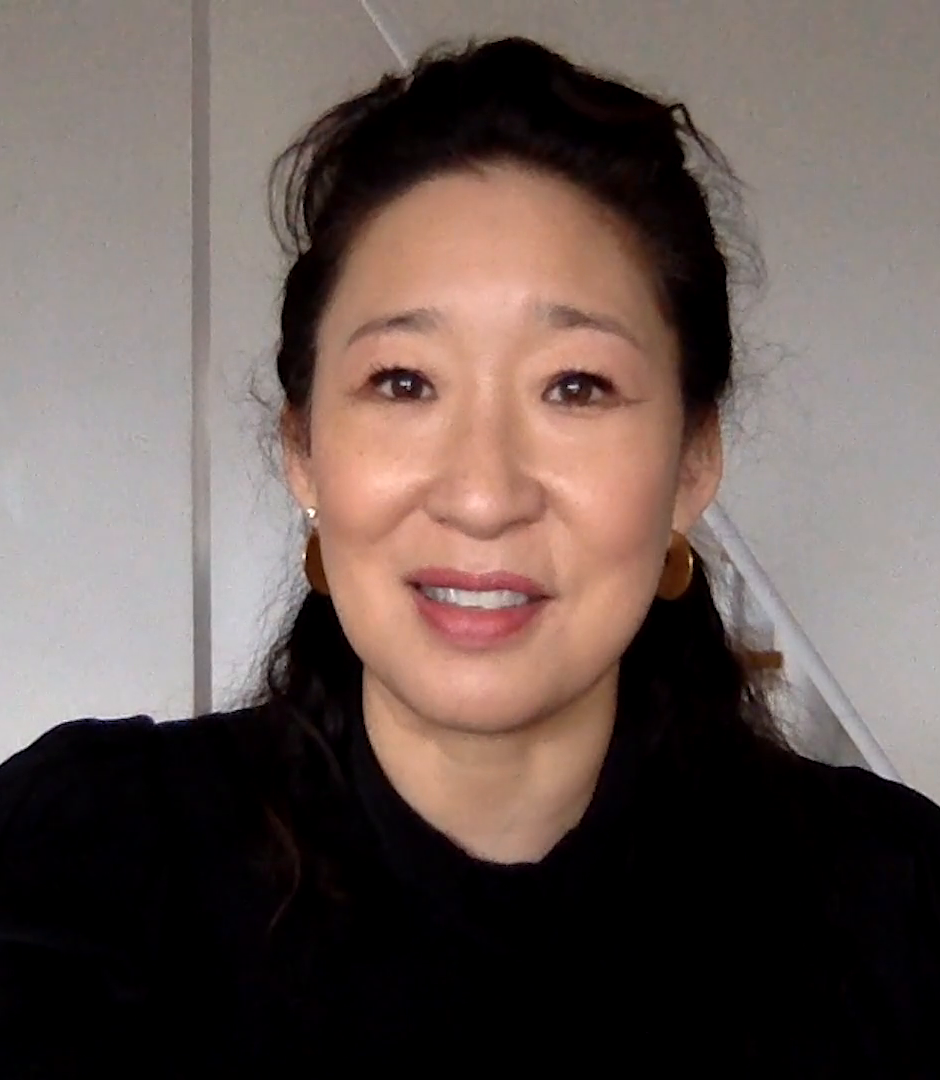
Oh during the 2021 Peabody Awards

In 2021, Oh served as executive producer and had the lead role in the Netflix comedy-drama series The Chair.

In 2022, Oh voiced the role of Ming Lee, the strict and overprotective mother of the main character in the Pixar animated film Turning Red. She joined Lynne Ramsay's adaptation of Margaret Atwood's short story collection Stone Mattress.

In 2023, Oh played the role of Jenny Yum, a brash, outgoing, and impulsive older sister of the main character in the 20th Century Studios comedy film Quiz Lady.

In 2025, she appeared in Good Fortune, directed by Aziz Ansari.

== Personal life ==
Oh was in a relationship with filmmaker Alexander Payne for five years. They married in January 2003, separated in early 2005, and divorced in late 2006.

On July 8, 2013, Oh received the key to the city of Ottawa from Mayor Jim Watson.

Oh practices Vipassanā, a Buddhist form of meditation. Her work in acting is informed by a loose creative collective that teaches "creative dream work", which reportedly fuses Jungian dream analysis with method acting and aims to bring one's "subconscious work into consciousness".

Oh became a US citizen in 2018. On the first anniversary of her citizenship, she discussed it while hosting Saturday Night Live and referred to herself as an "Asian-Canadian-American".

Oh was awarded the National Arts Centre Award from the Governor General of Canada in 2019, as a part of the Governor General's Performing Arts Awards.

In June 2022, Oh was named an officer of the Order of Canada. Later in that year, she was one of a number of recent inductees to the Order to be included in the Canadian delegation to the state funeral of Queen Elizabeth II.

=== Activism ===
On March 22, 2021, Oh gave a speech at a Stop Asian Hate rally in Pittsburgh, Pennsylvania, in response to the Atlanta spa shootings. She encouraged people "to reach out to the Asian American community", stating that they were "very scared".

I'm gonna be very, very brief, but one thing I know, many of us in our community are very scared, and I understand that, and one way to try to kind of go through– get through our fear is to reach out to our communities.....I will challenge everyone here: if you see something, will you help me? If you see one of our brothers and sisters in need, will you help us?...I am proud to be Asian! I wanna hear you say, I am proud to be Asian! I belong here! I am proud to be Asian! I belong here! Many of us don't get the chance to be able to say that, so I just wanted to give us an opportunity to be able to shout that.

== Acting credits ==
Key
†	Denotes films that have not yet been released

=== Film ===
Year	Title	Role	Notes
1989	The Journey Home		
1994	Double Happiness	Jade Li	
1997	Bean	Bernice Schimmel	
1997	Bad Day on the Block	Unknown	
1998	Last Night	Sandra	
1998	The Red Violin	Madame Ming	
1998	Permanent Midnight	Friend	
1999	Guinevere	Cindy	
2000	Waking the Dead	Kim	
2000	Dancing at the Blue Iguana	Jasmine Bulut	
2001	The Princess Diaries	Vice Principal Gupta	
2001	The Frank Truth	Herself	Documentary
2002	Big Fat Liar	Phyllis Caldwell	
2002	Full Frontal	Fourth fired employee	
2002	Long Life, Happiness & Prosperity	Kin Ho Lum	
2002	Barrier Device	Audrey	Short film
2003	Owning Mahowny	Craps player	Uncredited
2003	Rick	Michelle	
2003	Under the Tuscan Sun	Patti	
2004	Sideways	Stephanie	
2004	Wilby Wonderful	Carol French	
2004	Mulan II	Ting Ting	Voice
2005	Hard Candy	Judy Tokuda	
2005	Break a Leg	Young Turk	
2005	Cake	Lulu	
2005	3 Needles	Mary	
2005	Sorry, Haters	Phyllis MacIntyre	
2005	Kind of a Blur	Joe	
2006	The Night Listener	Anna	
2006	For Your Consideration	Marketing person	
2007	The Land Before Time XIII: The Wisdom of Friends	Doofah	Voice
2008	Blindness	Minister of Health	
2009	Defendor	Dr. Park	
2009	The People Speak	Herself	Documentary
2010	Quantum Quest: A Cassini Space Odyssey	Gal 2000	Voice
2010	Ramona and Beezus	Mrs. Meacham	
2010	Rabbit Hole	Gabby	
2014	Tammy	Susanne	
2015	Snowtime!	Four-Eyed Frankie	Voice
2016	Window Horses	Rosie Ming	Voice, also producer
2016	Catfight	Veronica Salt	
2017	Meditation Park	Ava	
2020	Over the Moon	Mrs. Zhong	Voice
2021	Raya and the Last Dragon	Virana	Voice
2021	The Same Storm	Grace Park	
2022	Turning Red	Ming Lee	Voice
2022	Umma	Amanda	Also executive producer
2023	Quiz Lady	Jenny Yum	Also producer
2024	The Tiger's Apprentice	Mistral	Voice
2024	Can I Get a Witness?	Ellie	
2025	Smurfs	Moxie	Voice
2025	Good Fortune	Martha	
2027	Untitled Daniels film †		Filming

=== Television ===
Year	Title	Role	Notes
1987	Switchback	Guest	1 episode
1989	Denim Blues	Gwen	Television pilot
1992	Degrassi High: School's Out	Waitress	Television film
1994	The Diary of Evelyn Lau	Evelyn Lau	Television film
1995	Cagney & Lacey: The View Through the Glass Ceiling	Angela Lum	Television film
1995	If Not for You	Anna	Episode: "The Kiss/Taking a Shower with My Two True Loves"
1995	Lonesome Dove: The Outlaw Years	Min Lee	Episode: "Badlands"
1996	Kung Fu: The Legend Continues	Mai Chi	Episode: "The First Temple"
1996–2002	Arliss	Rita Wu	Main role
1999	Happily Ever After: Fairy Tales for Every Child	Breadcrumb	Voice, episode: "The Three Little Pigs"
1999	Popular	Humanities teacher	Episode: "Under Siege/Mo' Menace, Mo' Problems"
2001	Further Tales of the City	Bambi Kanetaka	Miniseries
2001	Judging Amy	Shelly Tran	3 episodes
2001	Six Feet Under	Porn Starlet	Episode: "An Open Book"
2001–2002	The Proud Family	Marsha Mitsubishi	Voice, 3 episodes
2005–2013	American Dad!	Katie, Hiko Yoshida	Voice, 6 episodes
2005–2014	Grey's Anatomy	Cristina Yang	Main role (seasons 1–10)
2006	Odd Job Jack	Vanessa	Voice, 2 episodes
2006–2007	American Dragon: Jake Long	Sun Park	Voice, recurring role, Season 2
2007	Handy Manny	Jasmine Chang	Voice, 2 episodes
2008	Phineas and Ferb	Dr. Doofenshmirtz's girlfriend	Voice, episode: "Get That Bigfoot Outa My Face!"
2008	Sesame Street	Fairy cookie person	Episode: "The Cookie Touch"
2009	Robot Chicken	Kate Winslet, Sarah Connor	Voice, episode: "Cannot Be Erased, So Sorry"
2010	Thorne	Sarah Chen	Episode: "Scaredycat"
2011	Michael: Every Day	Judy Song	Episode: "Ridicule"
2014	Betas	Sharron	Episode: "Steppin' Out"
2015	Shitty Boyfriends	Kathy	6 episodes
2016	Peg + Cat	President	Voice, episode: "The Package Problem"
2017	American Crime	Abby Tanaka	4 episodes
2017	The Magic School Bus Rides Again	Dr. Sarah Bellum	Voice, episode: "Ralphie Strikes A Nerve"
2018–2022	Killing Eve	Eve Polastri	Main role; also executive producer
2018–2020	She-Ra and the Princesses of Power	Castaspella	Voice, recurring role
2019	76th Golden Globe Awards	Herself (co-host)	Television special
2019	Saturday Night Live	Herself (host)	Episode: "Sandra Oh / Tame Impala"
2021	The Chair	Ji-Yoon Kim	Main role; also executive producer
2021–present	Invincible	Debbie Grayson	Voice, main role
2022	The Sandman	The Prophet Siamese Cat	Voice, episode: "Dream of a Thousand Cats"
2023	Gremlins: Secrets of the Mogwai	Nüwa	Voice, 3 episodes
2024	The Sympathizer	Ms. Sofia Mori	5 episodes

=== Theatre ===
Year	Title	Role	Playwright	Venue	Ref.
1998	Dogeaters	Rio	Jessica Hagedorn	La Jolla Playhouse	
1998	Stop Kiss	Sara	Diana Son	Stein Shiva Theater, The Public Theater	
2006	Satellites	Nina	Diana Son	Joseph Papp Public Theater, The Public Theater	
2014	Death and the Maiden	Paulina	Ariel Dorfman	Victory Gardens Theater	
2016	Office Hour	Gina	Julia Cho	South Coast Repertory	
2024	The Welkin	Lizzy Luke	Lucy Kirkwood	Linda Gross Theatre, Off-Broadway	
2025	Twelfth Night	Olivia	William Shakespeare	Delacorte Theater, The Public Theater	
2025	La Fille du Régiment	Duchess of Krakenthorp	Gaetano Donizetti	Metropolitan Opera, Lincoln Center	
2026	The Misanthrope	Alice	Moliere	National Theatre	

== Awards and nominations ==
Among her accolades, she has received two Golden Globe Awards and four Screen Actors Guild Awards, as well as nominations for thirteen Primetime Emmy Awards, winning one in 2024.

== See also ==
- Koreans in New York City
