= List of Canadian films of 1993 =

Canadian flims released in 1993

This is a list of Canadian films which were released in 1993:

Title	Director	Cast	Genre	Notes
Aces: A Story of the First Air War	Raoul Fox		Docudrama	
André Mathieu, musicien	Jean-Claude Labrecque	André Mathieu	Documentary	
Anything for Love	Michael Keusch	Corey Haim, Nicole Eggert	Comedy	
Because Why	Arto Paragamian	Michael Riley, Martine Rochon, Doru Bandol	Comedy	
Blown Away	Brenton Spencer	Corey Haim, Nicole Eggert, Corey Feldman	Thriller	
Bob's Birthday	Alison Snowden & David Fine		National Film Board animated short	Academy Award - Animated Short
The Burning Season	Harvey Crossland	Akesh Gill, Jasminder K. Rattan, Om Puri, Dale Azzard	Drama	
Cadillac Girls	Nicholas Kendall	Jennifer Dale, Mia Kirshner, Gregory Harrison, Adam Beach	Drama	
Calendar	Atom Egoyan	Atom Egoyan, Arsinée Khanjian	Drama	
Cap Tourmente	Michel Langlois	Roy Dupuis, Gilbert Sicotte, Élise Guilbault, Andrée Lachapelle	Drama	
Chained Heat II	Lloyd A. Simandl	Brigitte Nielsen, Paul Koslo	Thriller	
Change of Heart	Donald Shebib	Jeremy Ratchford, Lenore Zann, Heath Lamberts	Drama	
A Childhood in Natashquan (Une enfance à Natashquan)	Michel Moreau	Gilles Vigneault	Documentary	
Cold Sweat	Gail Harvey	Ben Cross, Adam Baldwin, Shannon Tweed	Thriller	
Collateral Damage	Leonard Farlinger	Gary Farmer, David Nichols, Michael Mahonen, Gabrielle Rose	Short drama	
David Copperfield	Don Arioli	Sheena Easton, Kelly LeBrock, Julian Lennon	Animated drama	
Digger	Rob Turner	Adam Hann-Byrd, Joshua Jackson, Timothy Bottoms	Drama	
The Engagement (Les Fiancés de la tour Eiffel)	Gilles Blais		Documentary	
Entangled (Les Veufs)	Max Fischer	Judd Nelson, Pierce Brosnan, Laurence Treil, Roy Dupuis	Thriller	
La Florida	George Mihalka	Rémy Girard, Pauline Lapointe, Michael Sarrazin	Comedy	Golden Reel Award
Folk Art Found Me	Alex Busby		Documentary	
For the Moment	Aaron Kim Johnson	Russell Crowe, Christianne Hirt, Peter Outerbridge	Wartime drama	
Frank's Cock	Mike Hoolboom	Callum Keith Rennie	Short	TIFF – Best Canadian Short
Full Circle	Donna Read		Documentary	
Harmony Cats	Sandy Wilson	Kim Coates, Jim Byrnes, Lisa Brokop	Comedy, drama	
Hate Mail	Mark Sawers	Peter Outerbridge, Molly Parker	Short comedy	
I Love a Man in Uniform	David Wellington	Tom McCamus, Brigitte Bako, Kevin Tighe, David Hemblen	Drama	Genie Award for Best Actor
In the Gutter and Other Good Places	Cristine Richey		Documentary	Genie Award – Feature Documentary
Kanehsatake: 270 Years of Resistance	Alanis Obomsawin		National Film Board documentary	About the 1990 Oka standoff between the Canadian Military and Mohawk warriors; Best Canadian Feature, Festival of Festivals
The Lotus Eaters	Paul Shapiro	R. H. Thomson, Sheila McCarthy, Frances Hyland	Drama	Genie Awards – Actor (McCarthy), Screenplay, Sound Editing
Love and Human Remains	Denys Arcand	Thomas Gibson, Ruth Marshall, Cameron Bancroft, Mia Kirshner, Matthew Ferguson		Genie for Best Adapted Screenplay; Based on Brad Fraser's play
M. Butterfly	David Cronenberg	Jeremy Irons, John Lone, Barbara Sukowa, Ian Richardson	Melodrama based on the play by Henry David Hwang	
Matusalem	Roger Cantin	Marc Labrèche, Émile Proulx-Cloutier	Children's adventure	
Me, Mom and Mona	Mina Shum	Mina Shum, Mona Shum, So Yee Shum	Short documentary	
The Mighty River (Le Fleuve aux grandes eaux)	Frédéric Back	Donald Sutherland, Paul Hébert	Animation	
Moving the Mountain	William Ging Wee Dere, Malcolm Guy		Documentary	
Mustard Bath	Darrell Wasyk	Michael Riley, Martha Henry	Drama	Genie Award for Best Supporting Actress, Martha Henry
The Myth of the Male Orgasm	John Hamilton	Bruce Dinsmore, Mark Camacho, Miranda de Pencier, Ruth Marshall, Macha Grenon	Comedy	
Nasty Burgers	James Motluk	Jack Cruikshank, Gary Harper, Richard Guttman	Comedy	
Ordinary Magic	Giles Walker	Glenne Headly, David Fox, Paul Anka, Ryan Reynolds	Drama	
Paris, France	Jerry Ciccoritti	Leslie Hope, Peter Outerbridge	Sexual drama	
Picture of Light	Peter Mettler		Documentary	Canada-Switzerland co-production
Pearl's Diner	Lynn Smith		National Film Board animated short	Genie Award - Animated Short
Les Pots cassés	François Bouvier	Gilbert Sicotte, Marie Tifo, Marc Messier	Drama	Entered into the 18th Moscow International Film Festival
Red Hot	Paul Haggis	Balthazar Getty, Carla Gugino, Armin Mueller-Stahl, Donald Sutherland	Drama	
The Rise and Fall of English Montreal	William Weintraub		National Film Board documentary	
Samurai Cowboy	Michael Keusch	Hiromi Go, Catherine Mary Stewart, Robert Conrad	Western	
Save My Lost Nigga Soul	Clement Virgo	Richard Chevolleau, Dean Marshall, Dayo Ade	Short	TIFF - Best Canadian Short
The Sex of the Stars	Paule Baillargeon	Denis Mercier	Drama	
Shadow of the Wolf	Jacques Dorfmann	Lou Diamond Phillips, Toshiro Mifune, Jennifer Tilly, Donald Sutherland, Nicholas Campbell	Crime drama set in the Canadian Arctic	Canada-France co-production; Genie Awards – Art Direction, Costumes
TC 2000				
Thirty Two Short Films About Glenn Gould	François Girard	Colm Feore	Musical, drama	Genie Awards – Picture, Director, Cinematography, Editing
Time Runner	Michael Mazo	Mark Hamill, Rae Dawn Chong, Brion James	Science fiction	
Tomcat: Dangerous Desires	Paul Donovan	Richard Grieco, Natalie Radford, Maryam d'Abo, Serge Houde	Thriller	
Two Can Play (Deux actrices)	Micheline Lanctôt	Pascale Bussières, Pascale Paroissien	Drama	
Women in Love (Les Amoureuses)	Johanne Prégent	Louise Portal, Kenneth Welsh, Tony Nardi, Sophie Lorain, David La Haye	Drama	
Your Country, My Country (Dans ton pays...)	Marquise Lepage		Short drama	
Zero Patience	John Greyson	John Robinson, Normand Fauteux, Dianne Heatherington	Drama/musical	

== See also ==
- 1993 in Canada
- 1993 in Canadian television
