= Atma Kenswil =

Surinamese composer

- Born: 29 April 1892; Paramaribo
- Died: 1985 (aged 92–93)

Atma Kenswil (29 April 1892 – 1985) was a Surinamese composer and pianist who lived in the Netherlands.

Atma Kenswil was born on 29 April 1892 in Paramaribo. She studied piano at the Utrecht Conservatory, piano under Laszloffy and composition under Leo Weiner at the Liszt Academy in Budapest, and piano under Lazare Levy and composition under de la Presle at the Paris Conservatoire.

Following her death in 1985, neighbors retrieved her manuscripts from the trash, preserving them. In 1996, her Praeludium Pacis (1945) was performed by pianist Marjès Benoist at the Beurs van Berlage
