= Sidney Howard (artist) =

Canadian artist (1913–1992)

- Born: 1913; Nova Scotia
- Died: 1992 (aged 78–79); Albert Bridge, Cape Breton, Nova Scotia
- Known for: Sculpture, both relief and free-standing

Sidney Howard (1913 – August 12, 1992) was a Canadian folk artist who carved wood sculptures, sometimes life-size, and reliefs of people, either drawn from fantasy or based on models, fish, beavers, cats, birds and a totem pole. His trademark was the feeling of vitality in his creations.

Howard is grouped among the "Classic or First-Wave Folk Artists" in Nova Scotia, because like other members of this group, he started making art before the groundbreaking exhibition Folk Art of Nova Scotia of 1976. His work was known not only nationally but internationally.

== Biography ==
Howard was born in Sydney, Nova Scotia, and served in the army before getting married in 1945, then moved to Ontario where he worked for 18 years in the Garden City Paper Mill in St. Catharines (now closed). Howard's wife died in 1952 and in 1958, homesick, he moved back to Nova Scotia and settled on five acres of land in the community of Albert Bridge, near Sydney in Cape Breton. Inspired in 1962 by his only daughter Louise's picture of a deer in her coloring book, he began carving small sculptures. Since he had no car, he began carving much larger sculptures to put up outside the entrance to the path to his house to signify he lived there and welcome visitors. In the late sixties, many of his works were destroyed in a fire.

His creations have been called "whimsical" "exaggerated" and with a "quirky" character. He was inspired by legends and movies such as "Jaws" as well as television and carved with an axe, leaving rasp marks. His work was included in Folk Art of Nova Scoti in 1976 and in Nova Scotia Folk Art: Canada's Cultural Heritage of 1989.

Howard was featured in the "On the Road Again", a television program which spotlit Canadians and their stories. He also talked about his work during an interview for the National Film Board documentary "Folk Art Found Me" (1993).

Howard died of cancer in 1992.

== Legacy ==
In 1996, Sidney Howard's Beacons and Strays, was curated by Susan M. Foshay for the Art Gallery of Nova Scotia. In 2011, the Beaverbrook Art Gallery in Fredericton gave Howard and Joe Norris a joint show. In 2013, Judy DIetz for the Art Gallery of Nova Scotia organized an exhibition titled Show of Hands of Howard's work among others.

== Selected public collections ==
- Cape Breton University Art Gallery;
- Art Gallery of Nova Scotia, Halifax;
- Canadian Museum of History, Gatineau, Quebec;
- Art Windsor-Essex;
