= 15th Genie Awards =

1994 Canadian film awards ceremony

- Date: December 7, 1994
- Site: Metro Toronto Convention Centre, Toronto
- Hosted by: Graham Greene

Highlights
- Best Picture: Exotica
- Most awards: Exotica
- Most nominations: Exotica

Television coverage
- Network: CBC Television

The 15th Genie Awards were held on December 7, 1994 to honour Canadian films released that year. Actor Graham Greene hosted the ceremony.

Building on the success of its Genie specials of the last two years, the academy and the CBC produced two shows for this year's event. Genies Countdown was a one-hour preview show which aired twice before the gala; for the Quebec market, Les Grands Moments du Genie aired immediately after the show.

The 1994 year's awards were dominated by Atom Egoyan's Exotica, and Whale Music, the debut film of director Richard J. Lewis. Another newcomer, Michel Poulette, won the Claude Jutra Award for outstanding achievement for first-time direction for his film Louis 19, le roi des ondes (Louis 19, King of the Airwaves), which also won the Golden Reel Award as the year's most commercially successful film.

== Award winners and nominees ==
| Motion Picture | Direction |
|---|---|
| Exotica — Atom Egoyan, Camelia Frieberg; Double Happiness — Rose Lam Waddell, Stephen Hegyes; Louis 19, King of the Airwaves (Louis 19, le roi des ondes) — Jacques Dorfmann, Richard Sadler; My Friend Max (Mon amie Max) — Aimée Danis, Carole Ducharme, Alain Rocca; Whale Music — Raymond Massey, Jr., Steven DeNure | Atom Egoyan, Exotica; André Forcier, The Wind from Wyoming (Le Vent du Wyoming); Micheline Lanctôt, Two Can Play (Deux actrices); Richard J. Lewis, Whale Music; Léa Pool, Desire in Motion (Mouvements du désir); Mina Shum, Double Happiness |
| Actor in a leading role | Actress in a leading role |
| Maury Chaykin, Whale Music; Martin Drainville, Louis 19, King of the Airwaves (Louis 19, le roi des ondes); Gary Farmer, Henry & Verlin; Elias Koteas, Exotica; Gilbert Sicotte, Les Pots cassés | Sandra Oh, Double Happiness; Nancy Beatty, Henry & Verlin; Geneviève Bujold, My Friend Max (Mon amie Max); Valérie Kaprisky, Desire in Motion (Mouvements du désir); Marie Tifo, Les Pots cassés |
| Actor in a supporting role | Actress in a supporting role |
| Don McKellar, Exotica; Matthew Ferguson, Love and Human Remains; Scott Kraft, For the Moment; Callum Keith Rennie, Double Happiness; Michel Rivard, My Friend Max (Mon amie Max) | Martha Henry, Mustard Bath; Wanda Cannon, For the Moment; Mia Kirshner, Love and Human Remains; Johanne McKay, My Friend Max (Mon amie Max); Joanne Vannicola, Love and Human Remains |
| Original Screenplay | Adapted Screenplay |
| Atom Egoyan, Exotica; Roger Cantin, Matusalem; Gilles Desjardins, Les Pots cassés; Léa Pool, Desire in Motion (Mouvements du désir); Mina Shum, Double Happiness | Brad Fraser, Love and Human Remains; Jefferson Lewis, Ordinary Magic; Paul Quarrington and Richard J. Lewis, Whale Music |
| Best Short Film | Best Documentary |
| Arrowhead — Emmet Sheil, Peter Lynch; Bob's Birthday — David Fine, Alison Snowden; Collateral Damage — Leonard Farlinger, Pamela Davenport; Save My Lost Nigga Soul — Damon D'Oliveira, Clement Virgo; Without Rockets — Keith Tomasek, Gary Yates | In the Gutter and Other Good Places — Cristine Richey; André Mathieu, musicien — Jean-Claude Labrecque, Micheline Blais; Fat Chance — Joseph MacDonald, Charles Konowal; Folk Art Found Me — Alex Busby, Mike Mahoney; Kanehsatake: 270 Years of Resistance — Alanis Obomsawin, Wolf Koenig |
| Art Direction/Production Design | Cinematography |
| Richard Paris and Linda Del Rosario, Exotica; Luc J. Béland, Jerome's Secret (Le secret de Jérôme); Serge Bureau, Desire in Motion (Mouvements du désir); Marie-Carole de Beaumont, Les Pots cassés; Vianney Gauthier, Matusalem | Paul Sarossy, Exotica; Sylvain Brault, My Friend Max (Mon amie Max); François Protat, Kabloonak; Paul Van der Linden, Henry & Verlin; Peter Wunstorf, Double Happiness |
| Costume Design | Editing |
| Linda Muir, Exotica; Francesca Chamberland, Matusalem; Jacinthe Demers, Jerome's Secret (Le secret de Jérôme); Sabina Haag, Desire in Motion (Mouvements du désir); Gaétanne Lévesque, Les Pots cassés | Alison Grace, Double Happiness; Michel Arcand, Desire in Motion (Mouvements du désir); Jacques Gagné, My Friend Max (Mon amie Max); Denis Papillon, Louis 19, King of the Airwaves (Louis 19, le roi des ondes); Susan Shipton, Exotica |
| Overall Sound | Sound Editing |
| Daryl Powell, Dean Giammarco, Bill Sheppard and Paul A. Sharpe, Whale Music; Michel Descombes, Richard Besse, Luc Boudrias and Réjean Juteau, A Hero's Life (La Vie d'un héros); Keith Elliott, Ross Redfern, Peter Kelly and Daniel Pellerin, Exotica; Dean Giammarco, Bill Sheppard, Garrell Clark and Paul A. Sharpe, Road to Saddle River; Louis Hone, Dominique Chartrand, Jacques Drouin and Hans Peter Strobl, Matusalem; Hans Künzi, François Musy, Florian Eidenbenz and Jo Caron, Desire in Motion (Mouvements du désir) | Cal Shumiatcher, Eric Hill, Marti Richa, Issac Strozberg and Shane Shemko, Whale Music; Michel B. Bordeleau, Diane Boucher, Natalie Fleurant and Jérôme Décarie, Matusalem; Sue Conley, Andy Malcolm, Paul Shikata, Peter Winninger and Steve Munro, Exotica; Jacques Plante, Antoine Morin, Jérôme Décarie and Michel Arcand, Desire in Motion (Mouvements du désir); Marti Richa, Eric Hill, Shane Shemko, Cal Shumiatcher and Jacqueline Cristianini, Road to Saddle River |
| Achievement in Music: Original Score | Achievement in Music: Original Song |
| Mychael Danna, Exotica; George Blondheim, Whale Music; Mark Korven, Henry & Verlin; Milan Kymlicka, A Hero's Life (La Vie d'un héros); Milan Kymlicka, Matusalem | Rheostatics, "Claire" — Whale Music; Penny Anne Baker and Michael Conway Baker, "Far Away" — Savage Land; Brad Hayes and Ray Bonneville, "Say Those Things" — The Myth of the Male Orgasm; Rheostatics, "Song of Courtship" — Whale Music; Glenn Schellenberg and John Greyson, "Just Like Scheherazade" — Zero Patience; Shari Ulrich, Graeme Coleman and David Graff, "Every Road" — Max |
| Special awards | |
| Claude Jutra Award: Michel Poulette, Louis 19, King of the Airwaves (Louis 19, le roi des ondes); Golden Reel Award: Louis 19, King of the Airwaves (Louis 19, le roi des ondes); Outstanding Contributions to the Canadian Film Industry: René Malo | |
