= Agnelle Bundervoët =

French pianist (1922–2015)

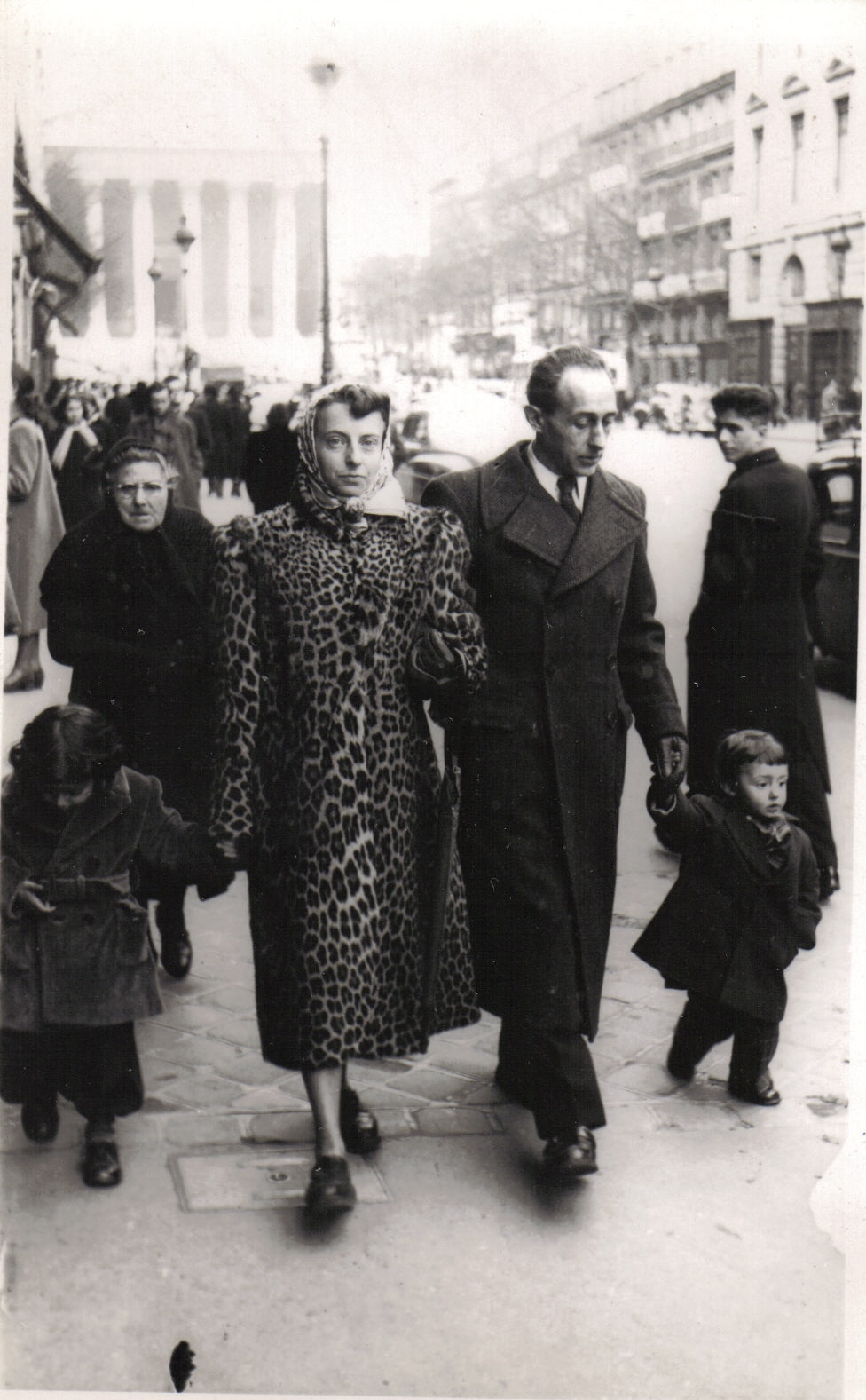
- Agnelle with Lucien Pavillet and her oldest sons, Joël and Axel
- Born: October 12, 1922; Ambert, France
- Died: February 14, 2015; Vaucresson, France

Agnelle Bundervoët (12 October 1922 – 14 February 2015) was a pianist and composer, regarded as one of the greatest French pianists of the 20th century.

== Life and career ==
Agnelle Bundervoët was born in Puy de Dôme, Ambert, France. Her father, who had a career in the French army, was of Flemish descent. After joining the Conservatoire de Marseille, she joins the Conservatoire National Supérieur de Paris at age 10 to later enroll in classes taught by her master Lazare Lévy, Jacques de La Presle, Maurice Hewitt, and Marcel Dupré. Despite Lazare Lévy’s dismissal by the Vichy government during the war, Agnelle continued her studies at the Conservatoire and was awarded her Premier Prix in 1942. She won the first prize six times.

In 1944, her father died not having recovered from his time in a German prison camp, and her brother, Henri died when he lost control of his plane over the English Channel. That same year, Agnelle married Lucien Pavillet, a graduate from the École Polytechnique, with whom she had three children.

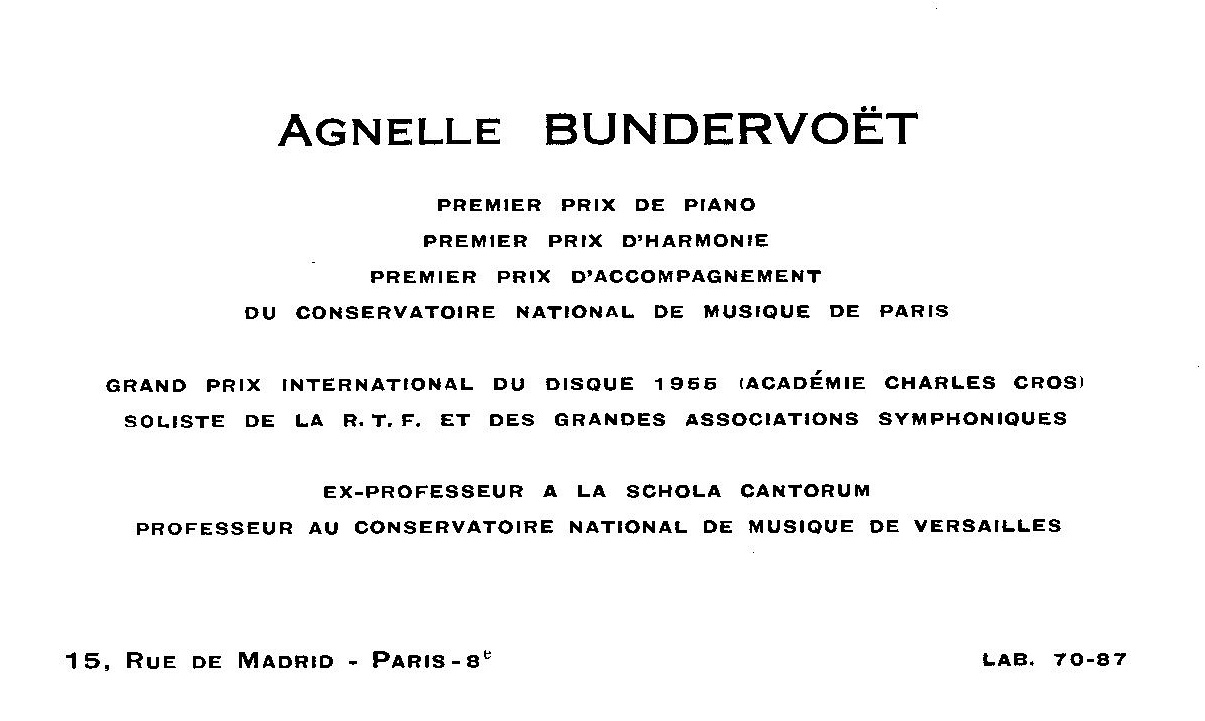

After the war, Bundervoët quickly became a soloist of the great symphonic orchestras under the greatest conductors of her time, including Paul Paray, Eugène Bigot, Charles Bruck, and Pierre-Michel Le Conte. For several years was chosen by Alexis Roland-Manuel for his live broadcast on France Musique, Plaisir de la Musique.

She received the Grand Prix International du Disque (Académie Charles-Cros) with a Johann Sebastian Bach recital published by Ducretet Thomson. Her extraordinary interpretation of the Chaconne gave rise to passionate debates between musicologists and critics. As a result, she was exclusively invited by Decca in France to produce three LPs, Liszt, Brahms, and Schumann. She taught at Le Conservatoire National de Versailles into the 1980s.

Bundervoët was divorced in 1956 and in the late 1950s began a longterm relationship with Egyptologist Maurice Braun, with whom she travelled to Egypt and other areas of the world. She died on 14 February 2015 in Vaucresson, France. Her name was given as Agnelle Bundervoët Braun.
