= Barry Peterson (cinematographer) =

Canadian-American cinematographer

Barry Peterson is a Canadian-American cinematographer.

Born in Alberta, Canada, Peterson initially worked in special visual effects on various productions before moving into live action cinematography, where he began shooting commercials for companies such as Apple, Pepsi, and Nike. Peterson is father to two sons.

As a cinematographer, Peterson's first credited film was 1993's Mustard Bath. When he moved to Los Angeles, Peterson was hired as the director of photography for Ben Stiller's Zoolander, which would quickly lead to work on numerous studio films. Barry has worked frequently with directors Rawson Marshall Thurber, Phil Lord and Christopher Miller, John Francis Daley, and Jonathan Goldstein.

In television, Peterson worked on the pilot episodes of the series The Cape, Brooklyn Nine-Nine, and The Good Place.

== Filmography ==
=== Film ===
Year	Title	Director	Notes
1993	Mustard Bath	Darrell Wasyk	
2001	Zoolander	Ben Stiller	
2002	Dark Blue	Ron Shelton	1st of 3 collaborations with Shelton
2003	Hollywood Homicide	Ron Shelton	
2004	Starsky & Hutch	Todd Phillips	
2008	Jumper	Doug Liman	
2012	21 Jump Street	Phil Lord; Christopher Miller	1st of 3 collaborations with Lord and Miller
2012	The Watch	Akiva Schaffer	
2013	We're the Millers	Rawson Marshall Thurber	
2014	The Lego Movie	Phil Lord; Christopher Miller	Live-action scenes only
2014	22 Jump Street	Phil Lord; Christopher Miller	
2015	Sisters	Jason Moore	
2015	Vacation	Jonathan Goldstein; John Francis Daley	1st of 4 collaborations with Goldstein and Daley
2016	Central Intelligence	Rawson Marshall Thurber	
2017	The Space Between Us	Peter Chelsom	
2017	Just Getting Started	Ron Shelton	
2018	Game Night	Jonathan Goldstein; John Francis Daley	
2018	The Spy Who Dumped Me	Susanna Fogel	
2018	Goosebumps 2: Haunted Halloween	Ari Sandel	
2020	Superintelligence	Ben Falcone	
2021	Thunder Force	Ben Falcone	
2023	Dungeons & Dragons: Honor Among Thieves	Jonathan Goldstein; John Francis Daley	
2023	My Big Fat Greek Wedding 3	Nia Vardalos	
2024	It Ends with Us	Justin Baldoni	
2026	Melania	Brett Ratner	with Dante Spinotti and Jeff Cronenweth
2026	In Memoriam	Rob Burnett	
2026	Mayday	Jonathan Goldstein; John Francis Daley	
2026	Focker-in-Law †	John Hamburg	Post-production
TBA	One Attempt Remaining †	Kay Cannon	Post-production

=== Television ===
Year	Title	Director(s)	Notes
2011	The Cape	Simon West	"Pilot"
2013	Brooklyn Nine-Nine	Phil Lord; Christopher Miller	"Pilot"
2016	The Good Place	Drew Goddard	"Everything Is Fine"
