= The Girl in the White Coat =

- Directed by: Darrell Wasyk
- Written by: Darrell Wasyk
- Based on: The Overcoat by Nikolai Gogol
- Produced by: Michel Ouellette; Darrell Wasyk
- Starring: Pascale Montpetit
- Cinematography: Jean-François Lord
- Edited by: Heidi Haines
- Music by: Cory Rizos
- Production companies: Ciné Qua Non Media; Oculus.ca
- Distributed by: Domino Film & Television International
- Release date: October 15, 2011 (Montreal)
- Running time: 112 minutes
- Country: Canada
- Languages: English, French

The Girl in the White Coat is a 2011 Canadian drama film directed and written by Darrell Wasyk, based on the short story "The Overcoat" by Nikolai Gogol.

== Plot ==
Elise, a factory worker who lives in isolation and is tormented by her co-workers, decides that despite her lack of money, she must get her coat fixed. A case of mistaken identity pulls her into events she had not intended.

== Cast ==
- Steven Bettez as Security Guard
- Christian Grenier as Andy
- Joey Klein as Sterling
- Roc LaFortune as Mr. Rossi
- Louise Marleau as Mrs. Prouve
- Monique Mercure as Mrs. Valinsky
- Pascale Montpetit as Elise
- Neil Napier as Spike
- Julien Poulin as Elise's Father
- Paul Savoie as Monsieur Prouve
- Lita Tresierra as Cindy

== Recognition ==
The Girl in the White Coat earned Pascale Montpetit a Genie Award nomination for Best Actress at the 32nd Genie Awards in 2012. At the 15th Jutra Awards in 2013, Joey Klein was nominated for Best Supporting Actor.
