= A Hero's Life (film) =

- La vie d'un héros
- Directed by: Micheline Lanctôt
- Written by: Micheline Lanctôt
- Produced by: Rock Demers
- Starring: Marie Cantin; Gilbert Sicotte; Véronique Le Flaguais
- Cinematography: Thomas Vámos
- Edited by: Gaétan Huot
- Music by: Milan Kymlicka
- Production companies: Les Productions La Fête Inc. National Film Board of Canada
- Distributed by: Malofilm Distribution
- Release date: August 25, 1994 (MWFF)
- Running time: 103 minutes
- Country: Canada
- Language: French

A Hero's Life (French: La vie d'un héros) is a Canadian drama film, directed by Micheline Lanctôt and released in 1994. The film stars Marie Cantin as Évelyne Vadeboncoeur, a woman who travels to her hometown to meet Hanibal Heck (Erwin Potitt), a former German prisoner of war who had worked on her family farm during World War II. The film also stars Gilbert Sicotte and Véronique Le Flaguais as Évelyne's parents Bertin and Agathe.

The film was shot in Frelighsburg, Quebec in early 1994.

The film premiered at the Montreal World Film Festival, and was subsequently screened at the 1994 Toronto International Film Festival.

The film received two Genie Award nominations at the 15th Genie Awards, for Best Overall Sound (Réjean Juteau, Luc Boudrias, Richard Besse, Michel Descombes) and Best Original Score (Milan Kymlicka). It was one of six finalists for the Rendez-vous du cinéma québécois's Prix L.-E. Ouimet-Molson in 1995.
