= Richard Paris (production designer) =

Canadian production designer and art director

- Occupation: Production designer Art director
- Awards: Genie Award for Best Art Direction/Production Design

Richard Paris is a Canadian production designer and art director based in Vancouver, British Columbia.

With collaborator Linda Del Rosario and director Atom Egoyan, Paris worked on the films Speaking Parts (1989) and The Adjuster (1991). The three collaborated again on Exotica (1994), where Del Rosario and Paris were tasked to design a "lushly rendered tropical set". They shared the Genie Award for Best Art Direction/Production Design for Exotica.

== Filmography ==
His films include:

- Speaking Parts (1989)
- The Adjuster (1991)
- Exotica (1994)
- Never Talk to Strangers (1995)
- Firestorm (1998)
- The Linda McCartney Story (2000)
- Steal This Movie (2000)
- In a Class of His Own (2001)
- Frankie & Alice (2010)
