= Ray Bonneville =

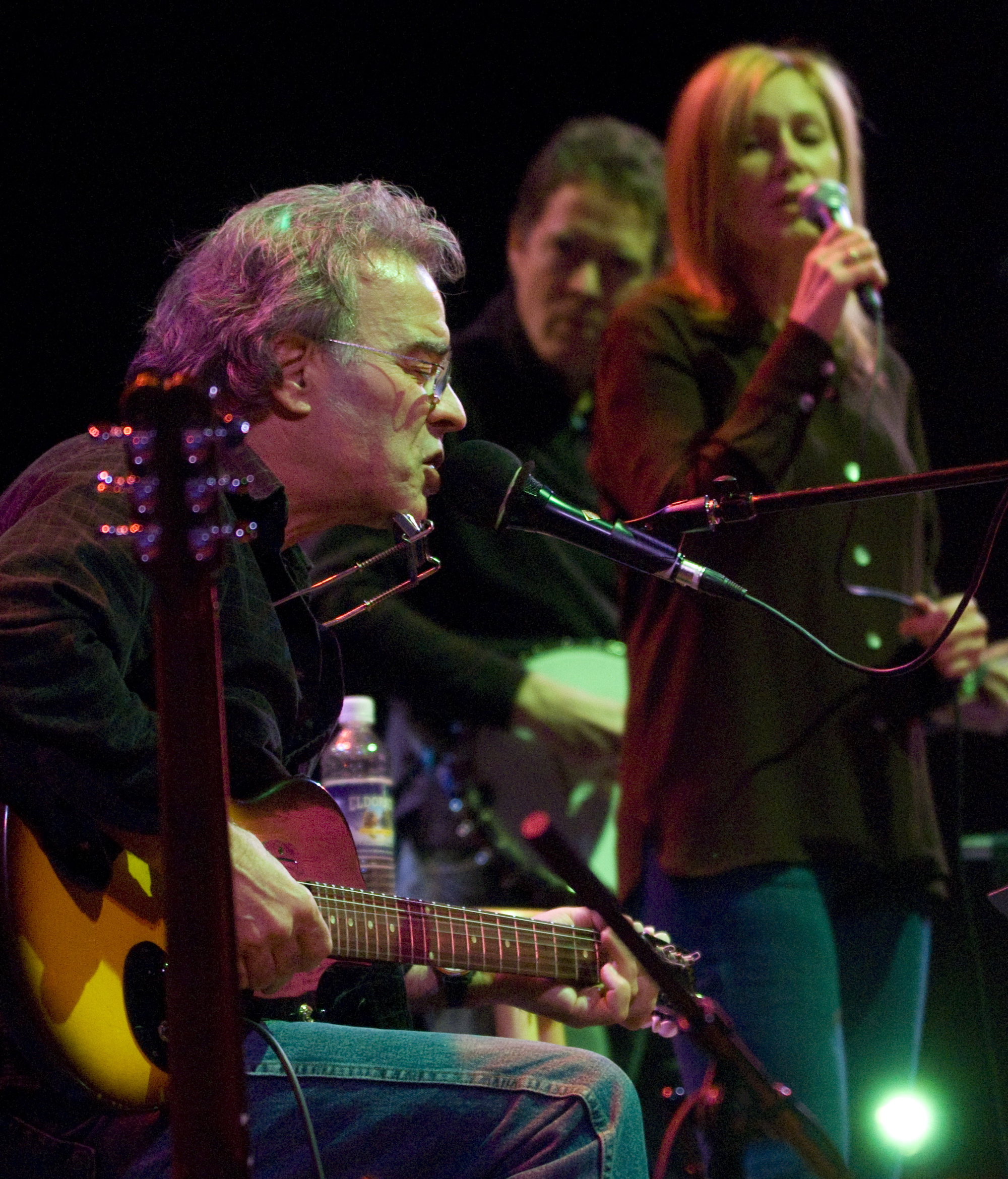
- Ray Bonneville performs on eTown

Background information
- Born: Raymond J. Bonneville; October 11, 1948 (age 77); Hull, Quebec, Canada
- Genres: Blues
- Instrument(s): Guitar, harmonica
- Labels: Red House
- Website: raybonneville.com

Raymond J. Bonneville (born October 11, 1948) is a Canadian-born American musician, singer and songwriter. Born in Canada, and raised in the United States, Bonneville is a folk and blues-influenced, song and groove man who is strongly influenced by New Orleans, Louisiana.

To date, Bonneville has released ten records and, in 2000, won the prestigious Juno Award (Canadian Grammy) for his third album Gust of Wind. As a touring musician Bonneville plays more than one hundred and fifty shows a year across the United States, Canada and Europe.

== History ==
Ray Bonneville was born in Hull, Quebec (now Gatineau, Quebec), the second-oldest of nine siblings in a family that spoke solely French. When he was twelve his family re-located to Quebec City. Soon after, his father, a mechanical engineer, found work in Boston, Massachusetts, the family relocated to the States and Bonneville was placed into public school without knowing a bit of English. There, Bonneville fell behind in school, but took to music in a big way after a friend showed him how to play guitar. Bonneville always had a contentious relationship with his father and often ran away from home. To keep his son home his father bought him a guitar and let him smoke cigarettes in the house.

Bonneville's family moved back to Canada when Bonneville was in his late teens and Bonneville, who had been expelled from school, signed up for the United States Marine Corps just in time for the Vietnam War.

Returning from the war, Bonneville worked in Boston as a taxicab driver to pay the bills, teaching himself to play harmonica between fares. Getting more involved in the music scene, Bonneville began freelancing with R&B and blues bands in the Boston area. Then, in the 1970s, Bonneville began traveling the country exploring and absorbing musical styles, playing at festivals and small clubs across the United States, and opening for the likes of B.B. King, Muddy Waters, and Dr. John.

In the 1970s Bonneville, while in Colorado, learned how to fly a plane and supplemented his income by working as a flight instructor in New Orleans and Boston as well as doing aerial-advertising banner-pulling over Cape Cod, Massachusetts. In 1988 Bonneville returned to Quebec to work as a bush pilot. From May through October he would transport hunters, fishermen, and surveyors into and out of remote areas in a de Havilland Beaver float plane.

Bonneville's music was heavily influenced by his time spent in New Orleans during the 1980s, and later. It is often said that the sound of New Orleans is that of rhythm, the rhythms of a brassy jazz band, of the mighty Mississippi River, of the Delta bluesmen, and the rhythm of slowness. It is this rhythm, this slowness, that captured Bonneville. Bonneville soaked up the prevalent take-your-time attitude that ran through the music being played in New Orleans. "There's something about the heat and humidity that makes people slow down," he says. "New Orleans is where I learned to take my time, to allow space between the notes so the songs could truly groove." It is that groove that is the core of Bonneville's sound. A one-man band, he backs his weathered voice with a highly percussive guitar style, dramatic harmonica lines, and a foot that keeps a steady beat (Bonneville often stomps on a piece of plywood to amplify the beat of his songs). Bonneville's I Am the Big Easy, the 2009 Folk Alliance International Song of the Year features the heart and resilience of New Orleans, post-Katrina.

Musician Brad Hayes is credited, by Bonneville, for much of his early musical development. Hayes and Bonneville had a friendship and musical partnership that lasted for decades, including playing in bands in Colorado for six or seven years, and Hayes performing on Bonneville's CD's. Other musical influences of Bonneville's include Tony Joe White, Mississippi John Hurt and J.J. Cale (to whom he's often compared). "Bonneville writes songs of true-to-life characters who stumble their way through a rough-and-tumble world of violence, hope, and despair" (Jim Blum, NPR).

== Awards and recognition ==
Honing his songwriting craft for the last 35 years, "Bonneville's raw, tell-it-like-it-is storytelling style has won him critical acclaim" (Blum, NPR). Bonneville has been nominated for three Juno awards, winning the 2000 Best Blues Album for his third album Gust of Wind (1999). His fourth release Rough Luck was also nominated, as was his 2004 Red House debut Roll It Down, which made his name in the US, garnering rave reviews from DownBeat and No Depression. Since then, his star has been on the rise, with his award-winning release Goin' By Feel, his folk-charting cover of Bob Dylan's song "It Takes a Lot to Laugh, It Takes a Train to Cry" (featured on A Nod to Bob 2: An Artists Tribute to Bob Dylan on His 70th Birthday) and receiving the 2009 Folk Alliance International Song of the Year for I Am the Big Easy, featuring post-Katrina New Orleans.

Bonneville has "shared the stage with blues heavyweights B.B. King, Muddy Waters, J.J. Cale, and Robert Cray, and has performed on the stages of South by Southwest and Folk Alliance" (Blum, NPR).

At the 15th Genie Awards, Bonneville and Hayes received a Genie Award nomination for Best Original Song for the song "Say Those Things" from the film The Myth of the Male Orgasm.

Bonneville won the Grassy Hill Kerrville Folk Festival New Folk Singer-Songwriter Competition in 1999.

== Discography ==
=== Albums ===
Title	Album details
On the Main	Release date: 1993; Label: Electric Desert Records
Solid Ground	Release date: 1996; Label: Bluetone Records
Gust of Wind	Release date: 1999; Label: Stony Plain Records
Rough Luck	Release date: 2000; Label: 1-800-Prime
Roll It Down	Release date: 2003; Label: Red House Records
Goin' by Feel	Release date: 2007; Label: Red House Records
Bad Man's Blood	Release date: 2011; Label: Red House Records
Easy Gone	Release date: 2014; Label: Red House Records
At King Electric	Release date: 2018; Label: Stonefly Records
On the Blind Side	Release date: 2023; Label: Unknown

=== Singles ===
Year	Single	Peak chart positions		Album
Year	Single	CAN Country	CAN AC	Album
1995	"The Good Times"	45	—	On the Main
1995	"Dance with Me"	—	19	On the Main
1997	"Nothing to Lose"	76	54	Solid Ground
1998	"When the Night Time Comes"	60	—	Solid Ground
"—" denotes releases that did not chart
