= Linda Del Rosario =

Canadian production designer and art director

- Occupation: Production designer Art director
- Awards: Genie Award for Best Art Direction/Production Design

Linda Del Rosario is a Canadian production designer and art director.

With Vancouver-based collaborator Richard Paris and director Atom Egoyan, Del Rosario worked on the films Speaking Parts (1989) and The Adjuster (1991). The three collaborated again on Exotica (1994), where Del Rosario and Paris were tasked to design a "lushly rendered tropical set". They shared the Genie Award for Best Art Direction/Production Design for Exotica. In 1996, she was production designer for Never Talk to Strangers, highlighting "cool aquas and fiery reds".

Her other work includes the miniseries Iron Road. In 2009, Del Rosario won a Leo Award for Best Production Design in a Feature Length Drama for the miniseries.

== Filmography ==
Her films include:

- Speaking Parts (1989)
- The Adjuster (1991)
- Exotica (1994)
- Never Talk to Strangers (1995)
- Firestorm (1998)
- The Linda McCartney Story (2000)
- Steal This Movie (2000)
- In a Class of His Own (2001)
- Frankie & Alice (2010)
