= Little Tougas =

1976 Canadian film directed by Jean-Guy Noël

- French: Ti-Cul Tougas
- Directed by: Jean-Guy Noël
- Written by: Jean-Guy Noël
- Produced by: René Gueissaz; Marc Daigle
- Starring: Claude Maher; Micheline Lanctôt; Suzanne Garceau; Gilbert Sicotte
- Cinematography: François Beauchemin
- Edited by: Marthe de la Chevrotière
- Music by: Georges Langford
- Production company: ACPAV
- Release date: October 8, 1976
- Running time: 84 minutes
- Country: Canada
- Language: French

Little Tougas (French: Ti-Cul Tougas) is a Canadian comedy-drama film, directed by Jean-Guy Noël and released in 1976. The film stars Claude Maher as Rémi Tougas, a musician who is hiding out in the Magdalen Islands with his girlfriend Odette (Micheline Lanctôt) after stealing his band's payment from a gig; they plan to further escape to California with Odette's friend Gilberte (Suzanne Garceau), but their plans are complicated when Rémi's bandmate Martin (Gilbert Sicotte) arrives to recover the money.

The cast also includes Louise Forestier, Jean-Louis Millette, Guy L'Écuyer and Gabriel Arcand.

Carmel Dumas of Cinema Canada praised the film, writing that it demonstrated "that a very good young cinema is hard on the heels of the Carles and the Jutras of Quebec's film community."

The film won the Prix L.-E.-Ouimet-Molson from the Association québécoise des critiques de cinéma.
