= Lita Tresierra =

Costa Rican singer and actress (1977–2010)

- Born: 1977; San José, Costa Rica
- Died: 21 June 2010 (aged 32–33); Montreal, Canada
- Occupations: Singer; actress
- Years active: 1994–2010

Lita Tresierra (1977 – 21 June 2010) was a Costa Rican singer and actress. She was the singer of the alternative rock musical group La Nueva P (1994–1997), which released the album Simple. The band was formally dissolved when she left the country, but re-gathered in 2009.

Though she had made a number of appearances in television and film, Tresierra became especially well known after landing a prominent role as the voice actress of Rosa in the 2009 action-adventure video game Assassin's Creed II.

On 21 June 2010, Tresierra was involved in a major traffic collision in Montreal, Quebec, Canada, and fell into a coma for two days before succumbing to her injuries. Following her death, Ubisoft made the decision to indefinitely retire her character Rosa from the Assassin's Creed series, amid widespread speculation that she would have reprised her role in games to come.

== Filmography ==
- The Factory (2012) as Divine
- The Girl in the White Coat (2011) as Cindy
- Assassin's Creed II (2009) as Rosa
- Durham County (2009) as Dr. Deena Alexie
- Dr. Jekyll & Mr. Hyde (2008) as Nurse
- The Dead Zone (2007) as Maria Toro
- Lethal Obsession (2007) as Mary Cummins
- The Ecstasy Note (2006) as Nereida
- Blue Line (2005) as Girlfriend
- Naked Josh (2005) as Hotel Waitress
- Act of War: Direct Action (2005) as Lieutenant Vega
- False Pretenses (2004) as Teenage Girl Waitress
