= Ms. Bear =

1997 Canadian-German adventure film

- Directed by: Paul Ziller
- Written by: Antony Anderson; Robert Jason; Paul Ziller
- Story by: Jane Rouen
- Produced by: Mary Sparacio
- Starring: Ed Begley Jr.
- Cinematography: Paul Van der Linden
- Edited by: Rob Zaitzow
- Music by: Christopher Franke
- Release date: October 5, 1997 (Mill Valley)
- Running time: 103 minutes
- Countries: Germany; Canada
- Language: English

Ms. Bear is a 1997 German-Canadian adventure film directed by Paul Ziller and starring Ed Begley Jr.

== Cast ==
- Ed Begley Jr. as Greg Bradley
- Shaun Johnston as Barney Porter
- Kaitlyn Burke as Emily Bradley
- Natja Jamaan as Sara Bradley
- Kimberley Warnat as Melissa Bradley
- Dennis Arduini as Patrick Porter
- Arthur Brauss as Schroeder
- Devin Douglas Drewitz as Eldridge Porter

== Sequel ==
The film spawned a sequel in 2000 titled Bear With Me.
