= Joe Norris (artist) =

Canadian artist (1925–1996)

- Born: Joseph Norris; 17 March 1925; Halifax, Nova Scotia, Canada
- Died: 8 March 1996 (aged 70); Lower Prospect, Nova Scotia
- Known for: artist

Joe Norris (17 March 1925 – 8 March 1996) was a Canadian folk artist who painted images of his environment in Lower Prospect, Nova Scotia and places he learned about through television in crisp shapes, strong design and bright colour. He created wall paintings and painted furniture as well as models of villages, boats and lighthouses.

Norris has a secure place among the "Classic or First-Wave Folk Artists" in Nova Scotia, because like other members of this group, he started making art before the groundbreaking exhibition of Folk Art of Nova Scotia of 1976. In 1978, a museum director, Bruce Ferguson called him "the Matisse of folk art". In 2000 Bernard Riordon, the director of the Art Gallery of Nova Scotia, called him one of the greatest folk artists in Nova Scotia, a "Nova Scotia icon and a national treasure".

== Early life and career ==
Norris, one of nine children, was born in Halifax, and with his family moved to Lower Prospect, Nova Scotia just south of Halifax when he was seven years old. His father died when he was nine and he had to leave school after grade four to support his mother.

At age 15 during a bout of pleurisy, he began to paint and did so occasionally thereafter. From age 16 to 29, he worked in construction in Halifax and then as a lobster fisherman for 20 years. He only became a full-time painter in 1973 after a heart attack forced him into an early retirement at the age of 49.

At first, he sold paintings to local people and to tourists, then was discovered by Chris Huntington, an American artist and art dealer, who purchased his work from 1975 until 1982. In 1976, his paintings were included in the Folk Art of Nova Scotia exhibition at the Art Gallery of Nova Scotia which travelled to the National Gallery of Canada in 1978. In 1978, the Dalhousie Art Gallery held the exhibition Joe Norris: Paintings and Furniture. In 1979, Norris's first solo show outside Nova Scotia took place at the Mira Godard Gallery in Toronto. In 1983, Norris was included in the exhibition by the National Museum of Man (today the Canadian Museum of History) titled From the Heart, which toured Canada. In 2000, a major retrospective titled Joe Norris: Painted Visions of Nova Scotia accompanied by a book of the same name by Bernard Riordon was created by the Art Gallery of Nova Scotia was circulated to public galleries in Canada.

== Selected public collections ==
Norris's paintings are in the permanent collections of the Art Gallery of Nova Scotia and the Canadian Museum of History.
