= Exotica (film) =

1994 film by Atom Egoyan

- Theatrical release poster
- Directed by: Atom Egoyan
- Written by: Atom Egoyan
- Produced by: Atom Egoyan; Camelia Frieberg
- Starring: Bruce Greenwood; Mia Kirshner; Don McKellar; Arsinée Khanjian; Elias Koteas
- Cinematography: Paul Sarossy
- Edited by: Susan Shipton
- Music by: Mychael Danna
- Production company: Ego Film Arts
- Distributed by: Alliance Communications Corporation
- Release dates: May 16, 1994 (Cannes); September 23, 1994 (Toronto)
- Running time: 104 minutes
- Country: Canada
- Language: English
- Budget: CAD 2 million
- Box office: CAD 15 million

Exotica is a 1994 Canadian film written and directed by Atom Egoyan, and starring Bruce Greenwood, Mia Kirshner, Don McKellar, Arsinée Khanjian, and Elias Koteas. Set primarily in the fictional Exotica strip club in Toronto, the film concerns a father grieving over the loss of a child and his obsession with a young stripper. It was inspired by Egoyan's curiosity about the role strip clubs play in sex-obsessed societies. Exotica was filmed in Toronto in 1993.

Marketed as an erotic thriller on its release in Canada and the United States, the film proved to be a major box office success for English-language Canadian cinema, and received positive reviews. It won numerous awards, including the FIPRESCI Prize at the Cannes Film Festival and eight Genie Awards, including Best Motion Picture.

== Plot ==
Francis Brown, a tax auditor for Revenue Canada, is a regular visitor to a Toronto strip club called Exotica. He always has Christina, an exotic dancer dressed in a schoolgirl uniform, give him a private dance. This inspires the jealousy of the club's DJ, Eric, Christina's former boyfriend who has also impregnated the club's owner, Zoe. While at the club, Francis pays his brother Harold's teenage daughter, Tracey, to "babysit". However, Francis has no children and the girl merely practices music alone on his piano until Francis returns and drives her home. Francis' relationship with Harold is strained, as Francis learned that Harold and Francis' wife had been having an affair before she died in a car accident that left Harold a paraplegic. Francis' daughter, Lisa, had been kidnapped and murdered a few months before the accident, and he was one of the suspects but was later exonerated. These events have left a huge psychological scar on Francis.

In his professional life, Francis is sent to audit an exotic pet store owned and operated by Thomas Pinto, an introverted gay man profiting from the illegal import of a rare bird species. Thomas has been smuggling hyacinth macaw eggs, and his operation has afforded him hundreds of thousands of dollars a year, spurring suspicion from Canadian authorities. Francis soon discovers these illegal activities in Thomas' financial records.

Francis is eventually banned from Exotica when Eric manipulates him into touching Christina during one of her dances, violating the club's rules. Having realized that Eric intentionally set out to get Francis banned from the club, he vows to murder him. Armed with the knowledge of Thomas's tax evasion, Francis blackmails Thomas into visiting Exotica, and instructs him to touch Christina during one of her dances, so that Thomas too will be thrown out of the club; Francis intends to use this as an opportunity to infiltrate the club and murder Eric.

Francis affixes Thomas with a wiretap so that he can listen in on Thomas's visit to Exotica. While Christina gives Thomas a lap dance, he attempts to glean information from her, and the two have a conversation which Francis listens to from his parked car. Christina explains to Thomas that she and Francis share a relationship of mutual dependency, and reveals to Thomas personal details about Francis's life, specifically his daughter's murder. A distraught Francis exits his car and waits for Eric outside the club. Confronting Eric with a gun, Francis is defused when Eric reveals he and Christina, who met each other while volunteering in a search party for the missing Lisa, were the ones who discovered Lisa's dead body. Francis embraces Eric.

In a flashback, Francis drives a teenage Christina—who, at that time, worked for Francis and his wife as Lisa's babysitter—to her parents' home. During these routine drives, Francis would often comfort Christina over her troubled home life. As Francis drops Christina off at her house, he assures her that she can always confide in him.

== Cast ==
- Bruce Greenwood as Francis Brown
- Mia Kirshner as Christina
- Don McKellar as Thomas Pinto
- Sarah Polley as Tracey Brown
- Victor Garber as Harold Brown
- David Hemblen as inspector
- Peter Krantz as man in taxi
- Arsinée Khanjian as Zoe
- Elias Koteas as Eric
- Calvin Green as customs officer
- Damon D'Oliveira as man at opera
- Jack Blum as scalper
- Billy Merasty as man at opera
- Ken McDougall as doorman

== Production ==
=== Development ===
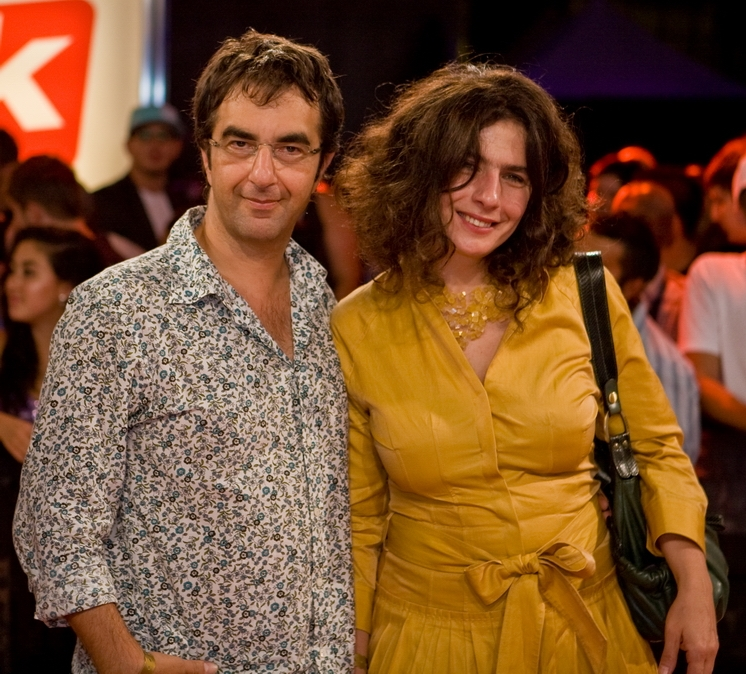
Director Atom Egoyan focused on strip clubs as outlets for society's sexual obsessions, while his pregnant wife Arsinée Khanjian played Zoe.

Director Atom Egoyan, who wrote the screenplay, first conceived of the story in the fall of 1992, intrigued by the ritualistic nature of table dances and the rule that clients can not touch the dancers, envisioning a story of a dancer having a main customer. He believed a strip club could be an important setting for a film because of society's sexual obsessions, and the roles of such clubs as "a collective sexual outlet". While wanting to portray the clubs accurately, he also believed he could bring a skeptical perspective.

He began working on the screenplay in February 1993. In writing it, he "wanted to structure the story like a striptease, gradually revealing an emotionally loaded history". He also cited thriller films as an influence. Although the city in the film is not named, Egoyan stated Exotica and his other films portray "different areas of Toronto".

The film had CAD 2 million budget, with CAD 900,000 coming from Telefilm Canada and the Ontario Film Development Corporation pledging CAD 700,000. To save money, Egoyan's own 1990 Volvo 240 station wagon was used as Francis's car.

=== Casting ===
With the script completed in April 1993, Egoyan began casting the film and choosing his crew, a process that took two months.

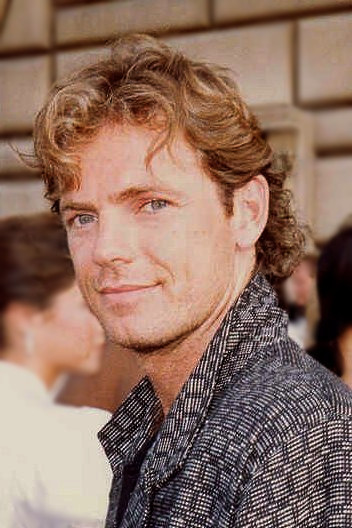
Bruce Greenwood starred as Francis, having met Egoyan before the director became internationally prominent.

Egoyan's wife Arsinée Khanjian played the club owner Zoe, having appeared in all of his previous films. Zoe is pregnant with Eric's child, and in reality, Khanjian was pregnant during filming, with Egoyan's son Arshile. Egoyan later expressed regret for surrounding Khanjian with nude women when she was unsure how her own body would change during her first pregnancy.

Bruce Greenwood was cast in the film after he met Egoyan through a mutual friend in a bar, before the director had raised his international profile. Greenwood had previously appeared in St. Elsewhere and Knots Landing, and the two became friends.

=== Filming ===
Art directors Richard Paris and Linda Del Rosario built the Exotica strip club set in an unused room in the Party Centre, a Toronto building, with construction commencing in May 1993. During production, several people arrived at the set believing it was a real club. For the outside of the club, the filmmakers used a shop on Mutual Street which has since been torn down, outside Metropolitan United Church. Osgoode Hall is used for the opera house.

The cinematography was done by Paul Sarossy, with Egoyan saying the goal of the camerawork was to capture the perspective of a missing character, in this case Francis' dead daughter. Principal photography was completed by July. Composer Mychael Danna recorded his score for the film from India, with influences from classical music in India.

== Release ==
Exotica was invited to compete in the Cannes Film Festival in May 1994, the first invitation for a Canadian film in several years. Based on the good reactions from film festivals, the film was able to fully recoup its CAD 2 million budget via international pre-sales even before getting theatrical release in Canada. The film was released on three screens in Toronto by Alliance Communications Corporation on September 29, 1994. In the United States, the film was initially released by Miramax Films in six cities; its distributors were impressed when Exotica grossed $14,379 per screen, allowing for a broader release to 433 screens. Miramax Films marketed the film as an erotic thriller. Egoyan stated that he was "very demanding that the image of Christina dressed as a schoolgirl won't be used on any posters, because it's an image that only makes sense in the context of the film", adding that he was "aware of how [the image] could be abused." Egoyan also commented that he felt "I don't think it's an erotic film at all. You begin by assuming the relationship between Francis and Christina is perverse, that he has a pedophiliac attraction to her. When you realize what is actually going on, it's platonic in the truest sense."

The film played in Toronto for 25 weeks, at one point in an IMAX theatre. In the United States, it was initially released in 500 theatres. In the Philippines, the film was released on July 27, 1995, with ads containing the tagline, "After Schindler's List and Belle Époque comes another controversial and multi-awarded hot film."

=== Home media ===
On home video, Exotica went out of print in Canada for years, but was available on DVD in England through the company Network. In 2012, Alliance Films released the film on DVD and Blu-ray in Canada, with commentary from Egoyan and Danna. The Criterion Collection released the film on Blu-ray and DVD on September 20, 2022, in the United States.

== Reception ==
=== Box office ===
The film grossed $32,856 in its opening weekend in Toronto. The film's initial box office performance in its limited release was considered "huge" by distributors. In March 1995, U.S. critic Roger Ebert reported Exotica was breaking box office records in Canada.

By 1995, Exotica had grossed $1.75 million in Canada, a substantial sum for English-language Canadian cinema. The film ended its run after grossing $5.13 million in the United States and Canada. The film grossed around CAD 15 million at worldwide box office.Exotica was Egoyan's biggest financial success, and has been called his box-office breakthrough.

=== Critical response ===
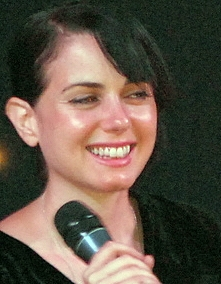
Canadian actress Mia Kirshner received positive reviews for her performance as Christina.

Exotica received positive reviews from critics. Rotten Tomatoes retrospectively collected 39 reviews and gave the film an approval rating of 95%, with an average rating of 8.3/10. The website's critics consensus reads, "Exotica simmers with sex and obsession, while successfully doubling as an extreme character study." On Metacritic, the film holds a weighted average score of 72 out of 100 based on 25 reviews, indicating "generally favorable reviews".

Roger Ebert gave the film four stars upon the film's initial release, calling it "a movie labyrinth, winding seductively into the darkest secrets of a group of people who should have no connection with one another, but do". He judged it Egoyan's best film to date and said Mia Kirshner "combines sexual allure with a kindness that makes her all the more appealing". In 2009, Ebert added the film to his Great Movies list, calling it a "deep, painful film about those closed worlds of stage-managed lust". Jonathan Rosenbaum called it "A must-see" and "lush and affecting", praising the score, the set and the camera movements. Leonard Klady, writing for Variety, called it "a haunting, chilling experience", albeit with an ending that was "anticlimactic, fuzzy and considerably less than a knockout emotional punch". Entertainment Weekly gave the film a B+, concluding "Like Christina's dance, the movie is a gorgeous tease, an artful promise of something that never quite arrives". Desson Howe, writing for The Washington Post, said it "starts off promisingly, but eventually sinks into its own convoluted oblivion". Peter Travers of Rolling Stone wrote "Exotica is Egoyan's most accomplished and seductive film to date", and less flashy than the upcoming Showgirls (1995) promised to be. B. Ruby Rich of The Advocate wrote the film is "a jigsaw puzzle of the emotions in which sex spells out whole language of human behavior", and said the cast, including Kirshner and Don McKellar, "rivet our attention on these characters". Critics complimented use of the song "Everybody Knows" by Leonard Cohen.

In 2001, Girish Shambu, writing for Senses of Cinema, said "Atom Egoyan's sad, elegant Exotica (1994) is at once intimate and remote, concrete and abstract", praising Bruce Greenwood for "quiet gravity" and Sarah Polley as "precociously perfect". In 2002, readers of Playback voted it the seventh greatest Canadian film ever made. In 2012, Jeff Heinrich of the Montreal Gazette gave the film five stars, calling it "An utterly hypnotic, X-rated art film" with a "haunting score". Mike D'Angelo of The A.V. Club stated "Exotica —much like Egoyan’s subsequent film, The Sweet Hereafter— proves to be a devastatingly cathartic exploration of tragedy's aftermath and the ways that people attempt to cope with inexpressible grief". In 2015, The Daily Telegraph named Exotica as one of "the 10 best (and worst) stripper movies", calling Egoyan "a then-wunderkind of Canadian cinema" and noting the film won awards at both Cannes and the AVN Awards, which are for pornography.

In 2001, an industry poll conducted by Playback named it the fifth best Canadian film of the preceding 15 years.

=== Accolades ===
At the 1994 Cannes Film Festival, Exotica won the FIPRESCI Prize, the first time an English-language Canadian film had won the honour. At the 1994 Genie Awards, the film won eight prizes, including Best Motion Picture and Best Director and Best Original Screenplay for Egoyan.

Award	Date of ceremony	Category	Recipients	Result	Ref.
AVN Awards	1996	Best Alternative Adult Film	Atom Egoyan	Won	
Belgian Film Critics Association	1995	Grand Prix	Atom Egoyan	Won	
Canadian Society of Cinematographers	1994	Best Cinematography in Theatrical Feature	Paul Sarossy	Won	
Cannes Film Festival	12–23 May 1994	FIPRESCI Prize	Atom Egoyan	Won	
Chicago Film Critics Association	1996	Best Film	Atom Egoyan	Nominated	
Chicago Film Critics Association	1996	Best Screenplay	Atom Egoyan	Nominated	
French Syndicate of Cinema Critics	1995	Best Foreign Film	Atom Egoyan	Won	
Genie Awards	1994	Best Motion Picture	Atom Egoyan and Camelia Frieberg	Won	
Genie Awards	1994	Best Direction	Atom Egoyan	Won	
Genie Awards	1994	Best Actor	Elias Koteas	Nominated	
Genie Awards	1994	Best Supporting Actor	Don McKellar	Won	
Genie Awards	1994	Best Original Screenplay	Atom Egoyan	Won	
Genie Awards	1994	Best Art Direction	Richard Paris and Linda Del Rosario	Won	
Genie Awards	1994	Best Cinematography	Paul Sarossy	Won	
Genie Awards	1994	Best Costume Design	Linda Muir	Won	
Genie Awards	1994	Best Editing	Susan Shipton	Nominated	
Genie Awards	1994	Best Sound	Daniel Pellerin, Keith Elliott, Peter Kelly and Ross Redfern	Nominated	
Genie Awards	1994	Best Sound Editing	Sue Conley, Andy Malcolm, Paul Shikata, Peter Winninger and Steve Munro	Nominated	
Genie Awards	1994	Best Original Score	Mychael Danna	Won	
Independent Spirit Awards	23 March 1996	Best Foreign Film	Atom Egoyan	Nominated	
Toronto International Film Festival	8–17 September 1994	Best Canadian Feature Film	Atom Egoyan	Won	

== Sources ==
- Beard, William (2007). "Atom Egoyan: Unnatural Relations". Great Canadian Film Directors. Edmonton: The University of Alberta Press. ISBN 978-0888644794.
- Burwell, Jennifer; Tschofen, Monique, eds. (2007). Image and Territory: Essays on Atom Egoyan. Waterloo, Ontario: Wilfrid Laurier University Press. ISBN 978-0889204874.
- Darke, Chris (2000). Light Readings: Film Criticism and Screen Arts. London: Wallflower Press. ISBN 1903364078.
- Hasan, Mila (2016). Essentially Bruce Greenwood: Actor Musician. Lulu.com. ISBN 978-1326589097.
- Kelly, Ursula A. (1997). Schooling Desire: Literacy, Cultural Politics, and Pedagogy. New York and London: Routledge. ISBN 041591549X.
- Magder, Ted (1995). "Making Canada in the 1990s: Film, Culture, and Industry". Beyond Quebec: Taking Stock of Canada. Montreal and Kingston: McGill-Queen's University Press. ISBN 0773513019.
- Naficy, Hamid (2001). An Accented Cinema: Exilic and Diasporic Filmmaking. Princeton and Oxford: Princeton University Press. ISBN 0691043914.
- Pike, David Lawrence (2012). Canadian Cinema Since the 1980s: At the Heart of the World. Toronto, Buffalo and London: University of Toronto Press. ISBN 978-1442698321.
- Tschofen, Monique; Burwell, Jennifer, eds. (1 October 2006). Image and Territory: Essays on Atom Egoyan. Wilfrid Laurier University Press. ISBN 0889205299.
- Tschofen, Monique (2002). "Repetition, Compulsion, and Representation in Atom Egoyan's Films". North of Everything: English-Canadian Cinema Since 1980. Edmonton: The University of Alberta Press. ISBN 088864390X.
- Wilson, Emma (2009). Atom Egoyan. Urbana and Chicago: University of Illinois Press. ISBN 978-0252076206.
- Wilson, Emma (2003). Cinema's Missing Children. Wallflower Press. ISBN 1903364507.
- Wong, Jan (2000). Lunch With. Doubleday. ISBN 0385259816.
