= Paul Van der Linden =

Dutch-Canadian cinematographer

Paul Van der Linden, sometimes credited as Paul Huguenot Van der Linden, is a Dutch-Canadian cinematographer. He is most noted for his work on the 1975 film Eliza's Horoscope, for which he won the Canadian Film Award for Best Cinematography at the 26th Canadian Film Awards, and the 1994 film Henry & Verlin, for which he was a Genie Award nominee in the same category at the 15th Genie Awards.

His other film credits have included High (1967), The Merry Wives of Tobias Rouke (1972), Once Upon a Time in the East (1974), Lies My Father Told Me (1975), King Solomon's Treasure (1979), Kelly (1981), Just a Game (1983), The Blue Man (1985), Ms. Bear (1997) and The Big Snake of the World (1999).
