= The Last Winter (1989 film) =

- Directed by: Aaron Kim Johnston
- Written by: Aaron Kim Johnston
- Produced by: Jack Clements; Ken Rodeck
- Starring: Joshua Murray; Gerard Parkes; David Ferry; Wanda Cannon
- Cinematography: Ian Elkin
- Edited by: Lara Mazur
- Music by: Victor Davies
- Production company: Rode Pictures
- Distributed by: National Film Board of Canada; CBC Television
- Release date: October 12, 1989 (VIFF)
- Running time: 115 minutes
- Country: Canada
- Language: English
- Box office: Can$250,000 (Canada)

The Last Winter is a Canadian drama film, directed by Aaron Kim Johnston and released in 1989. The film stars Joshua Murray as William Jamison, a young boy in smalltown Manitoba whose close relationship with his grandfather Jack (Gerard Parkes) is threatened when his parents Ross (David Ferry) and Audrey (Wanda Cannon) announce that they will be leaving Jack's farm to live in the city.

The cast also includes Kate Murray as William's younger sister Winnie.

The film was shot primarily around Oak Lake, Manitoba, Johnston's hometown, and was semi-autobiographical based on his own childhood.

The film premiered at the Vancouver International Film Festival in 1989. It screened at numerous film festivals, but had trouble receiving widespread theatrical distribution; at least one commercial distributor told Johnston that while the film was excellent it simply wasn't sellable to English Canadian or American audiences, and would have been a much bigger hit if he had filmed it in French for the Quebec market.

Marc Horton of the Edmonton Journal rated the film four stars, calling it "the best family film on the market right now", and especially praised the performances and the cinematography. He ultimately concluded that "it is a movie-going experience that's unique for English Canada. In fact, with its faintly European texture and pacing combined with our sensibilities, it is a film that should -- hopefully -- be around for a long, long time." It was broadcast by CBC Television in December 1990.

Designer Martha Wynne Snetsinger received a Genie Award nomination for Best Costume Design at the 11th Genie Awards in 1990.
