= Nancy Beatty =

Canadian actress

Nancy Beatty is a Canadian actress. Best known as a stage actress, she has also appeared in film and television roles.

On stage, she is a four-time Dora Mavor Moore Award winner, winning in 1990 for George F. Walker's Love and Anger, in 1991 for Morris Panych's 7 Stories, in 1995 for John Murrell's The Faraway Nearby and in 1999 for Walker's Risk Everything. She was also a nominee in 1986 for Don Hannah's The Wedding Script and in 1997 for Carole Fréchette's The Four Lives of Marie.

In film, she appeared in Where's Pete, The Michelle Apartments, Henry & Verlin, Life with Billy, Losing Chase, The Confessor, Casino Jack, Lars and the Real Girl, The Shipping News, For Those Who Hunt the Wounded Down, and City on Fire. She garnered a Genie Award nomination for Best Actress at the 15th Genie Awards in 1994 for Henry & Verlin.

On television, she appeared in The Newsroom and Foolish Heart, and garnered a Gemini Award nomination for Best Performance by an Actress in a Guest Role in a Dramatic Series for an appearance on This Is Wonderland.
