= Wanda Cannon =

Canadian actress and director (born 1960)

- Born: January 12, 1960 (age 66); Biggar, Saskatchewan, Canada
- Occupations: Actress; theater director
- Years active: 1983–present

Wanda Cannon (born January 12, 1960) is a Canadian actress and theatre director. She is most noted for her performance in the 1993 film For the Moment, for which she received a Genie Award nomination for Best Supporting Actress at the 15th Genie Awards in 1994.

== Early life ==
Cannon was born in Kitchener, Ontario, and raised primarily in Saskatchewan.

== Career ==
Cannon got her start as a musical theatre actress, and has continued to act and direct theatre throughout her career. Her other film roles have included The Last Winter (1989), Overdrawn at the Memory Bank (1984 ), The 6th Day (2000), and The Final Cut (2004 ). Cannon appeared in regular television roles as Stephanie Clements in My Secret Identity, and as Valerie Stanton in Heartland.

== Filmography ==
Wanda Cannon film and television credits
Year	Title	Role	Notes
1983	Chautauqua Girl	Melissande	Theatrical film
1984	Overdrawn at the Memory Bank	Felicia Varley/Lola	Television film
1986	A Judgment in Stone	Bernice	Theatrical film
1989	The Last Winter	Audrey Jamison	Theatrical film
1993	For the Moment	Betsy	Theatrical film
1983	American Playhouse	Felicia Varley / Lola	Episode: "Overdrawn at the Memory Bank"
1985, 1987	Night Heat	Bonnie Moreland / Dr. Reynolds	2 episodes
1986	Special Delivery	Marion	Television film
1986	Philip Marlowe, Private Eye	Viv	Episode: "Guns at Cyrano's"
1987	Bluffing It	Kristine	Television film
1988	Alfred Hitchcock Presents	Martha	Episode: "There Was a Little Girl..."
1988	Chasing Rainbows	Dottie	3 episodes
1988	Blades of Courage	Betty Widmer	Television film
1988–1991	My Secret Identity	Stephanie Clements	72 episodes
1991	Counterstrike	Kate	Episode: "Breaking Point"
1993	Exploring Ontario's Provincial Parks	Ellen Burke	3 episodes
1997	F/X: The Series	Diana	Episode: "Medea"
1997	Psi Factor	Helen Schraft	Episode: "The 13th Floor/The Believer"
1998	The Wonderful World of Disney	Rita Fletcher	Episode: "My Date with the President's Daughter"
1998	Due South	Olivia Murtagh	Episode: "Dr. Longball"
1998	Earth: Final Conflict	Maiya's Mom	Episode: "The Sleepers"
1999	Cry Rape	Phyllis Roberts	Television film
1999	The Hunt for the Unicorn Killer	Liz Maddux	Television film
2000	The 6th Day	Katherine Weir	Theatrical film
2000	Code Name: Eternity	Mrs. Keating	2 episodes
2001	Voyage of the Unicorn	Lily	2 episodes
2001	Night Visions	Mother	Episode: "My So-Called Life and Death"
2001	Mysterious Ways	Amanda Tergeson	Episode: "The Last Dance"
2002	The Dead Zone	Martha	Episode: "Unreasonable Doubt"
2002	First Shot	Kathryn Yarnell	Television film
2002	The Twilight Zone	Devora Kroner	Episode: "Night Route"
2002	Snow Queen	Minna	2 episodes
2003	Just Cause	Lydia Milbury	Episode: "The Closing"
2003	Peacemakers	Emma Smith	Episode: "Bad Company'
2003	Andromeda	Ch'kadau Leader	Episode: "Conduit to Destiny"
2004	The Final Cut	Caroline Monroe	Theatrical film
2004	Da Vinci's Inquest	Joanne Chavez	Episode: "A Man When He's Down"
2004	Perfect Romance	Marj	Television film
2005	Devour	Kathy Gray	Theatrical film
2005	Da Vinci's City Hall	Gloria Miner	Episode: "One Man, Two Jobs"
2005	Masters of Horror	Kathy Hobart	Episode: "Homecoming"
2005	The Christmas Blessing	Lydia Jones	Television film
2006	Flight 93	Debbie Welsh	Television film
2006	The Collector	Jane	Episode: "The Spy"
2006	A Trick of the Mind	Dr. Hauser	Television film
2006	Psych	Leslie Breyfogle	Episode: "Shawn vs. the Red Phantom"
2006	Totally Awesome	Kimberly's Mom	Television film
2006, 2007	Intelligence	Senator Louise Dugay	2 episodes
2007	My Baby Is Missing	Dale Pendergast	Television film
2007–2018	Heartland	Val Stanton	47 episodes
2008	Trial by Fire	Barbara	Television film
2009	Mrs. Miracle	Joan Maxwell	Television film
2010	Triple Dog	Mrs. Narn	Theatrical film
2011	Good Morning, Killer	Lynn	Theatrical film
2013	Emily Owens, M.D.	Helen	Episode: "Emily and...The Social Experiment"
2013	Cedar Cove	Mayor	Episode: "Cedar Cove: The Beginning"
2014	Motive	Margaret Matthews	Episode: "Deception"
2015	Surprised by Love	Claire Mayfield	Television film
2015	Angel of Christmas	Heather Nicholas	Television film
2016	Christmas List	Ellen Gray	Television film
2019	iZombie	Gayle Spano	Episode: "The Fresh Princess"
2019	Christmas at the Plaza	Lana	Television film
2020	Love in Winterland	Molly Wilson	Television film
