= Henry & Verlin =

- Directed by: Gary Ledbetter
- Screenplay by: Gary Ledbetter
- Based on: Stories by Ken Ledbetter
- Produced by: John Board; Simon Board; Jean Stawarz
- Starring: Gary Farmer; Keegan MacIntosh; Margot Kidder
- Cinematography: Paul Van der Linden
- Music by: Mark Korven
- Release date: 1994
- Running time: 87 minutes
- Country: Canada
- Language: English

Henry & Verlin is a 1994 Canadian film directed by Gary Ledbetter and starring Gary Farmer, Keegan MacIntosh, and Margot Kidder.

== Plot ==
Set during the Great Depression, the film centers on an unlikely friendship that forms between Henry (Gary Farmer), an autistic adult with a childlike spirit, and his nine-year-old nephew Verlin (Keegan MacIntosh), who is also autistic. Henry helps Verlin to come out of his shell, but Verlin's mother mistrusts him, believing him to be dangerous. Henry's family eventually decides to institutionalize him and Verlin sinks back into himself at the sudden loss of his friend.

== Cast ==
- Gary Farmer as Henry
- Keegan MacIntosh as Verlin
- Nancy Beatty as Minnie
- Robert Joy as Ferris
- Joan Orenstein as Agnes
- Eric Peterson as Lovejoy
- Margot Kidder as Mabel
- David Cronenberg as "Doc" Fisher
- Wilfrid Bray as Elvin
- Neil Dainard as Noel Winetree
- J. Winston Carroll as Reverend Rutherford
- Diana Belshaw as Judith
- Norma Edwards as Lydia
- Deborah Lobba as Matilida
- Nadine Rabinovitch as Hilda

== Accolades ==
The film was nominated for four awards at the 15th Genie Awards: Gary Farmer for Best Actor, Nancy Beatty for Best Actress, Paul Van der Linden for Best Achievement in Cinematography, and Mark Korven for Best Music Score.
