= Gilbert Sicotte =

Canadian actor (born 1948)

- Born: February 18, 1948 (age 78); Montreal, Quebec, Canada
- Occupation: Actor
- Years active: 1972–present

Gilbert Sicotte, CM (born February 18, 1948) is a Canadian actor.

== Career ==
Sicotte is known for roles in The Vultures (Les Vautours), Little Tougas (Ti-Cul Tougas), The Years of Dreams and Revolt (Les Années de rêves), The Secret Life of Happy People (La Vie secrète des gens heureux), Maria Chapdelaine (1983, Gilles Carle), Fortier, Louis Cyr, Léolo, Water Child (L'Enfant d'eau), Paul à Québec, And the Birds Rained Down (Il pleuvait des oiseaux) and Maria Chapdelaine (2021, Sébastien Pilote). He has also done some voice over work.

He has been a three-time Jutra/Iris Award winner for Best Actor, winning at the 14th Jutra Awards in 2011 for The Salesman, at the 18th Quebec Cinema Awards in 2016 for Paul à Québec, and at the 22nd Quebec Cinema Awards in 2020 for And the Birds Rained Down.

He has also been a four-time Genie and Canadian Screen Award nominee for Best Actor or Best Supporting Actor, receiving lead acting nods at the 14th Genie Awards in 1993 for Cap Tourmente, the 15th Genie Awards in 1994 for Les Pots cassés and the 8th Canadian Screen Awards in 2020 for And the Birds Rained Down, and a supporting nod at the 28th Genie Awards in 2008 for Continental, a Film Without Guns (Continental, un film sans fusil).

Sicotte taught at the Conservatoire d'art dramatique de Montréal from 1987 to 2018 for allegations of humiliating students in the classroom and authoritarian attitudes.

Sicotte was appointed a Member of the Order of Canada in 2013, "For his contributions to the performing arts as an actor, and for his commitment to training the next generation."

== Personal life ==
Sicotte is the father of Antoine Sicotte, a former founding member of Sky and currently a celebrity chef.

== Filmography ==
=== Film ===
Year	Title	Role	Notes
1972	Montreal Blues		
1976	Little Tougas (Ti-Cul Tougas, ou, Le bout de la vie)	Martin	
1976	Far from You Sweetheart (Je suis loin de toi mignonne)	Le jeune frère	
1979	Bye, See You Monday (Au revoir...à lundi)	L'homme sur le banc	
1980	Cordélia	Me Jean-Dominique Leduc	
1980	Good Riddance (Les Bons débarras)	Gaetan	
1980	Les grands enfants	François Gagné	
1980	Fantastica	Julien	
1980	The Coffin Affair (L'Affaire Coffin)	Le juré Guay	
1980	Contrecoeur	Roger Desfossés	
1983	Maria Chapdelaine	Da'Bé Chapdelaine	
1984	The Years of Dreams and Revolt (Les Années de rêves)	Louis Pelletier	
1984	Les illusions tranquilles	Narrator	Voice
1985	Pale Face (Visage pâle)	Jacques / un bum-a bum	
1986	Anne Trister	L'ami de Thomas	
1987	Les enfants de la rue: Fernand	Sigouin	
1992	The Saracen Woman (La Sarrasine)	Théo Lemieux	
1992	Léolo	Narrator	Voice
1992	Ma soeur, mon amour	Le père Messier	
1993	Les Pots cassés	Robert	
1993	Cap Tourmente	Jean-Louis McKenzie	
1994	A Hero's Life (La vie d'un héros)	Bertin	
1995	Water Child (L'Enfant d'eau)	Thomas	
2006	The Secret Life of Happy People (La vie secrète des gens heureux)	Bernard Dufresne	
2007	Bluff	John	
2007	Continental, a Film Without Guns (Continental, un film sans fusil)	Marcel Beaudoin	
2008	Mesrine	Le milliardaire	
2010	Piché: The Landing of a Man (Piché, entre ciel et terre)	Président d'AirTransat	
2011	The Salesman (Le Vendeur)	Marcel Lévesque	
2013	Louis Cyr (Louis Cyr, l'homme le plus fort du monde)	Gustave Lambert	
2014	Miraculum	Mari de Louise	
2014	The Wolves (Les loups)	Léon	
2015	The Passion of Augustine (La Passion d'Augustine)	L'aumônier	
2015	Paul à Québec	Roland	
2018	Identités	M. Morency	
2019	And the Birds Rained Down (Il pleuvait des oiseaux)	Charlie	
2019	Mafia Inc.	Henri Gamache	
2021	Maria Chapdelaine	Éphrem Surprenant	
2022	Arlette	Premier of Quebec	
2023	One Summer (Le temps d'un été)	Curé Beaulieu	

=== Television ===
Year	Title	Role	Notes
1990	The Paper Wedding	Bouchard	Television film
1991	Lance et compte: Le choix	Paul Lachance	Television film
1992	Bombardier	Joseph-Armand Bombardier	2 episodes
1994	Les grands procès	Me Raymond Daoust	Episode: "L'Affaire Mesrine"
1996	Marguerite Volant	Claude Volant	4 episodes
1997	Urgence	Claude Rivest	3 episodes
2001–2003	Fortier	Gabriel Johnson	42 episodes
2002	Un gars, une fille	L'enquêteur de l'impôt	1 episode
2008–2009	Belle-Baie	William Noël	12 episodes
2010–2014	Trauma	Antoine Légaré	54 episodes
2017	Victor Lessard	Ted Rutherford	5 episodes
2022	La Faille	Léopold Jolicoeur	8 episodes
