= In the Gutter and Other Good Places =

- Directed by: Cristine Richey
- Cinematography: Douglas Munro; Philip Letourneau
- Music by: Adrian Belew
- Release date: 1993 (VIFF)
- Running time: 56 minutes
- Country: Canada
- Language: English

In the Gutter and Other Good Places is a Canadian documentary film, directed by Cristine Richey and released in 1993. The film profiles three homeless men in Calgary, Alberta who support themselves dumpster diving and bottle picking for recyclable items.

The film premiered at the Vancouver International Film Festival in 1993, where it won the award for best short documentary. At the Hot Docs Canadian International Documentary Festival in 1994, the film won the awards for best independent production, best cinematography (Douglas Munro and Philip Letourneau), best musical score (Adrian Belew) and best overall sound (Steve Munro). The film won the Genie Award for Best Feature Length Documentary at the 15th Genie Awards, and was broadcast on CBC Television's documentary series Witness in 1995.
