= The Myth of the Male Orgasm =

- Directed by: John Hamilton
- Produced by: Robin Spry
- Starring: Bruce Dinsmore; Mark Camacho; Miranda de Pencier; Ruth Marshall; Macha Grenon
- Cinematography: John Berrie
- Edited by: Denis Papillon
- Music by: Ray Bonneville; Michel Pelletier
- Production companies: Doodskie Film Corporation; Telescene Film Group Productions
- Release date: September 1, 1993
- Running time: 90 minutes
- Country: Canada
- Language: English
- Box office: $49,349 (US/Canada)

The Myth of the Male Orgasm is a Canadian romantic comedy film, directed by John Hamilton and released in 1993.

The film stars Bruce Dinsmore as Jimmy Rovinski, a man whose lack of success with women leads him to sign up for a feminist study on male attitudes about sex and romance conducted by project leader "Jane Doe" (Miranda de Pencier). The cast also includes Mark Camacho and Burke Lawrence as Jimmy's roommates Tim and Sean, Ruth Marshall as his friend Mimi with whom he is in unrequited love, and Macha Grenon as his ex-girlfriend Paula.

The film premiered on September 1, 1993, at the Montreal World Film Festival.

Ray Bonneville and Brad Hayes received a Genie Award nomination for Best Original Song at the 15th Genie Awards, for the song "Say Those Things".
