= Mustard Bath (film) =

- Directed by: Darrell Wasyk
- Written by: Darrell Wasyk
- Produced by: Darrell Wasyk; David M. York
- Starring: Michael Riley; Martha Henry; Eddy Grant
- Cinematography: Barry Peterson
- Edited by: Tom McMurtry
- Music by: Rob Carroll
- Distributed by: Domino Film and Television International Ltd.
- Release date: February 1993 (Berlin International Film Festival)
- Running time: 110 minutes
- Country: Canada
- Language: English
- Budget: $1,200,000 (est.)

Mustard Bath is a 1993 Canadian film written and directed by Darrell Wasyk.

== Plot ==
Matthew, a young medical student from Toronto, Ontario, returns to his birthplace in Guyana on receiving a letter from his mother three months after her death. Prompted by his surroundings to sort through the idealized memories of his childhood, Matthew reaches the horrifying realization that he has returned to a world which he was never a part of. Contemporary Guyanese reality highlights the white colonialist privilege his family had enjoyed.

Retroactively homeless and nostalgically orphaned, he throws himself into his work at an underfunded and under equipped Georgetown hospital, developing a fatherly devotion to Dexter, a young orphaned boy housed at the local orphanage. Matthew spends endless nights with a ghostly old Hungarian woman who stumbles about the hallways of his hotel, spying on him with longing. She offers Matthew the comfort he has been seeking in the memories of his mother, seducing him with cigarettes and warm rum, and terrifying stories of being captured and raped by soldiers of the Hungarian Revolution of 1956. Slowly, even these marginal connections to reality disintegrated, and Matthew finds himself utterly alone.

== Cast ==
- Michael Riley as Matthew Linden
- Martha Henry as Grace
- Tantoo Cardinal as Sister Amantha
- Eddy Grant as Rasta Fad’dah
- Elizabeth Shepherd as Matthew's Mother

== Production ==
Mustard Bath was filmed in Guyana, South America. Much of the movie’s soundtrack is credited to Eddy Grant, and features the Mighty Sparrow’s hit No Money for Love.

== Awards ==
Martha Henry won a Best Supporting Actress for her portrayal of Grace at the 15th Genie Awards and at WorldFest-Houston International Film Festival the film won a Gold Prize for the Best Dramatic Feature Film.
