= Darrell Wasyk =

Canadian film director (born 1958)

- Born: 18 May 1958 (age 67); Edmonton, Alberta
- Occupations: Film Director, Screenwriter, Producer, Artist, Theatre Director, Playwright

Darrell Wasyk (born 18 May 1958 in Edmonton, Alberta) is a Canadian film director.

== Biography ==
Darrell Wasyk was born in Edmonton, Alberta. He worked extensively in both theatre and opera before making the transition to film.

== Film ==
Making his feature film debut with H, it won the Toronto-City Award for Best Canadian Feature Film at the Toronto International Film Festival. The film was presented at several Festivals that year including the Berlin International Film Festival, the Hong Kong International Film Festival, the Vienna International Film Festival, the Palm Springs International Film Festival, the Birmingham International Film and Television Festival, and the Locarno International Film Festival, where it picked up two major awards, making it the first Canadian feature film to win an official prize in the festival’s 47-year history. In Canada, H was presented at the Montreal World Film Festival, the Toronto International Film Festival, the Festival International du Film de Québec, and the Vancouver International Film Festival, where it won the Best Canadian Screenplay Award.

At the 12th Genie Awards the film won a Best Actress Award for Pascale Montpetit, and also received two nominations one for Best Direction and the other for Best Original Screenplay.

Mustard Bath, Wasyk’s second feature film, made its world premiere at the 1993 Berlin International Film Festival, and then made its North American premiere at the WorldFest-Houston International Film Festival, where it won a Gold Prize for the Best Dramatic Feature Film. Back in Canada, Mustard Bath screened at the Montreal World Film Festival, the Toronto International Film Festival, the Festival International du Film de Québec, and at the Vancouver International Film Festival.

At the 15th Genie Awards the film won a Best Supporting Actress Award for Martha Henry.

The Girl in the White Coat is Wasyk's third feature inspired by Gogol's The Overcoat, starring Pascale Montpetit where she picked up another Genie nomination for Best Actress performance in a Leading role in yet another Wasyk feature film, at the 32nd Genie Awards, as well as a Best Supporting Actor nomination for Joey Klein at the 2013 Jutra Awards.

== Television ==
In television, Wasyk directed five episodes of Ridley and Tony Scott’s Scottfree/Telescene Film Group’s Showtime original series The Hunger, starring David Bowie and Terence Stamp. Episodes include: Sloan Men, Anais, and The Lighthouse (1998), and The Suction Method and The Perfect Couple (1999).

== Art ==
Wasyk’s art installations include Intermission, List, Intermezzo, Middle, and Liszt, Franz at the Wynick/Tuck Gallery, as well as On Going at the YYZ Artists' Outlet both in Toronto, Ontario.

== Theatre ==
A student of the National Theatre School of Canada in Montreal, Quebec, Wasyk went on to apprentice with Sir Peter Hall at the Glyndebourne Festival Opera on Hall's productions of Mozart’s Don Giovanni and Dame Janet Baker’s farewell performance of Gluck’s Orfeo ed Euridice. His apprenticeship with Sir Peter Hall continued on to the National Theatre of Great Britain, where he worked with Harold Pinter on Other Places, and on Oscar Wilde’s The Importance of Being Earnest, both starring Judi Dench.

In New York, Wasyk worked with Tennessee Williams, directing the off-Broadway production of Out Cry. He continued studying at the Actors Studio, and later worked with Marshall W. Mason at the Circle Repertory Company.

Wasyk became the Associate Artistic Director of the Toronto Free Theatre from 1984 to 1986, as well as becoming the founding Artistic Director of his own theatre company 45.3, where he wrote and directed the Chalmers-nominated play In the Wee Hours. Other productions included Bertolt Brecht’s Baal, Alfred Jarry’s Ubu the King, Béla Bartók’s, Bluebeard’s Castle, and Sam Shepard’s Killer’s Head. During the Shaw Festival’s 1984 season, Wasyk directed the first play reading series, New Works.

== Filmography ==
=== Feature films ===
Year	Film	Notes
1990	H	
1994	Mustard Bath	
2011	The Girl in the White Coat	
