= Collateral Damage (1993 film) =

- Directed by: Leonard Farlinger
- Written by: Leonard Farlinger
- Produced by: Pamela Davenport; Leonard Farlinger
- Starring: Gary Farmer; David Nichols; Michael Mahonen; Gabrielle Rose
- Cinematography: Douglas Koch
- Edited by: Susan Maggi
- Music by: David Bradstreet
- Release date: August 29, 1993 (MWFF)
- Running time: 23 minutes
- Country: Canada
- Language: English

Collateral Damage is a 1993 Canadian dramatic short film written and directed by Leonard Farlinger. The film stars Gary Farmer as Glen, a counter clerk in a diner who is surprised when a news anchor (David Nichols) stops reporting on the Gulf War and begins talking directly to him through the television set. The cast also includes Michael Mahonen and Gabrielle Rose as customers of the diner.

The film had its theatrical premiere in 1993 at the Montreal World Film Festival, but was distributed primarily as an episode of the Global Television Network's New Producers Series anthology of short films by emerging Canadian directors.

The film was a Genie Award nominee for Best Theatrical Short Film at the 15th Genie Awards in 1994.
