= Ruth Marshall =

Canadian actress

- Born: June 7, 1965 (age 61); Toronto, Ontario, Canada
- Education: McGill University
- Occupation: Actress
- Years active: 1993–present

Ruth Marshall (born June 7, 1965) is a Canadian actress from Toronto, Ontario. She is known for her role in the hit television series Flashpoint. She graduated with a degree in English from McGill University in Montreal, Quebec and then returned to Toronto to pursue a career in acting.

She has appeared the television series Degrassi: The Next Generation and Doc, for which she earned a Gemini Award nomination in 2003 for Best Performance by an Actress in a Featured Supporting Role in a Dramatic Series. She played Johnette in the television movie The Path to 9/11. She was also in the films Dolores Claiborne and Love and Human Remains. Her first screen appearance was in The Myth of the Male Orgasm.

Marshall released her first book, Walk It Off in 2017. The book chronicles Marshall's experience after being diagnosed with a non-malignant tumor, and details her journey back to health.

== Filmography ==
=== Film ===
Year	Title	Role	Notes
1993	The Myth of the Male Orgasm	Mimi	
1993	Love and Human Remains	Candy	
1995	Dolores Claiborne	Secretary	
1996	Waiting for Michelangelo	Evelyn	
1999	Dogmatic	Maddy	
2008	Baby Blues	Martha	
2010	Casino Jack	Susan Schmidt	

=== Television ===
Year	Title	Role	Notes
1994	TekWar	Kylie Roman	TV film
1994	Wild C.A.T.s	Voodoo (voice)	Episodes: "Change of Mind", "Cry of the Coda"
1997	F/X: The Series	Chief Dispatcher	Episode: "Bad Influence"
1997	Too Close to Home	Adrienne	TV film
1998	Power Play		Episode: "High Noon"
1999	Half a Dozen Babies	Nina Angstrom	TV film
2001–2004	Doc	Donna Dewitt	Main role (87 episodes)
2004	This Is Wonderland		Episode: "1.12"
2005	Wild Card	Alana	Episode: "A Whisper from Zoe's Sister"
2006	Puppets Who Kill	Dan's Girlfriend	Episode: "Buttons and the Dying Wish Foundation"
2006	The Path to 9/11	Johnette	TV film
2007	'Til Death Do Us Part	Lavonne Cornell	Episode: "The Beauty Queen Murder"
2007	Friends and Heroes	Eza / Delilah (voice)	Recurring role (4 episodes)
2007–2013	Degrassi: The Next Generation	Helen Edwards	Recurring role (31 episodes)
2008	Daniel's Daughter	Dr. Candice Kessler	TV film
2008	Degrassi Spring Break Movie	Mrs. Edwards	TV film
2008–2009	Flashpoint	Dr. Amanda Luria	Regular role (15 episodes)
2009	The Dating Guy	Cody (voice)	Episode: "Bonnie & Mark"
2011	She's the Mayor	Chloe	Episode: "Gimme Shelter"
2011	The Listener	Amy Sterling	Episode: "To Die For"
2012	The Firm	Beverly	Episode: "Chapter 10"
2012	Rookie Blue	Mrs. Klein	Episode: "Coming Home"
2012	Christmas Song	Mrs. Barnes	TV film
2022	My Little Pony: Tell Your Tale	Phyllis	Episode: "Welcome to Mane Melody"

== Books ==
Year	Title	Genre	Notes
2017	Walk It Off	Memoir	Humorous
