= Pascale Montpetit =

French Canadian actress (born 1960)

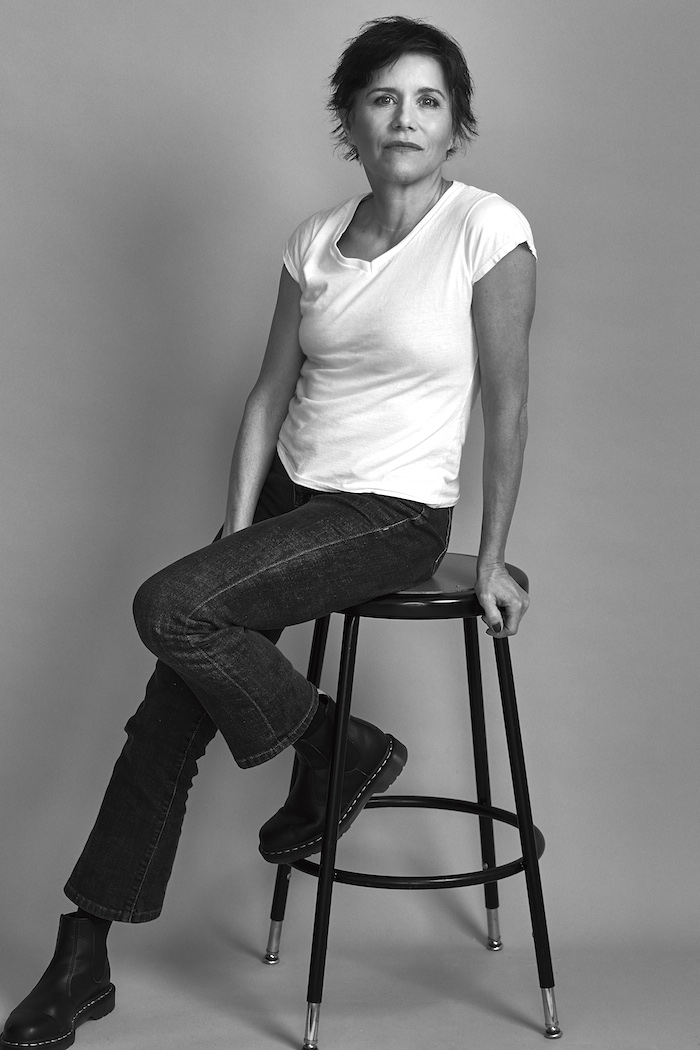

Pascale Montpetit (born 28 July 1960) is a French Canadian actress. In 1990 she won a Best Actress Genie Award for Darrell Wasyk's H. In 2002 she had a Genie Award for best actress in a supporting role for Mario Azzopardi's Savage Messiah.

She has also won two Gémeaux Awards, one Jutra Award and a Mons International Festival of Love Films Award.
