= Lower Prospect, Nova Scotia =

Human settlement in Nova Scotia, Canada

Lower Prospect
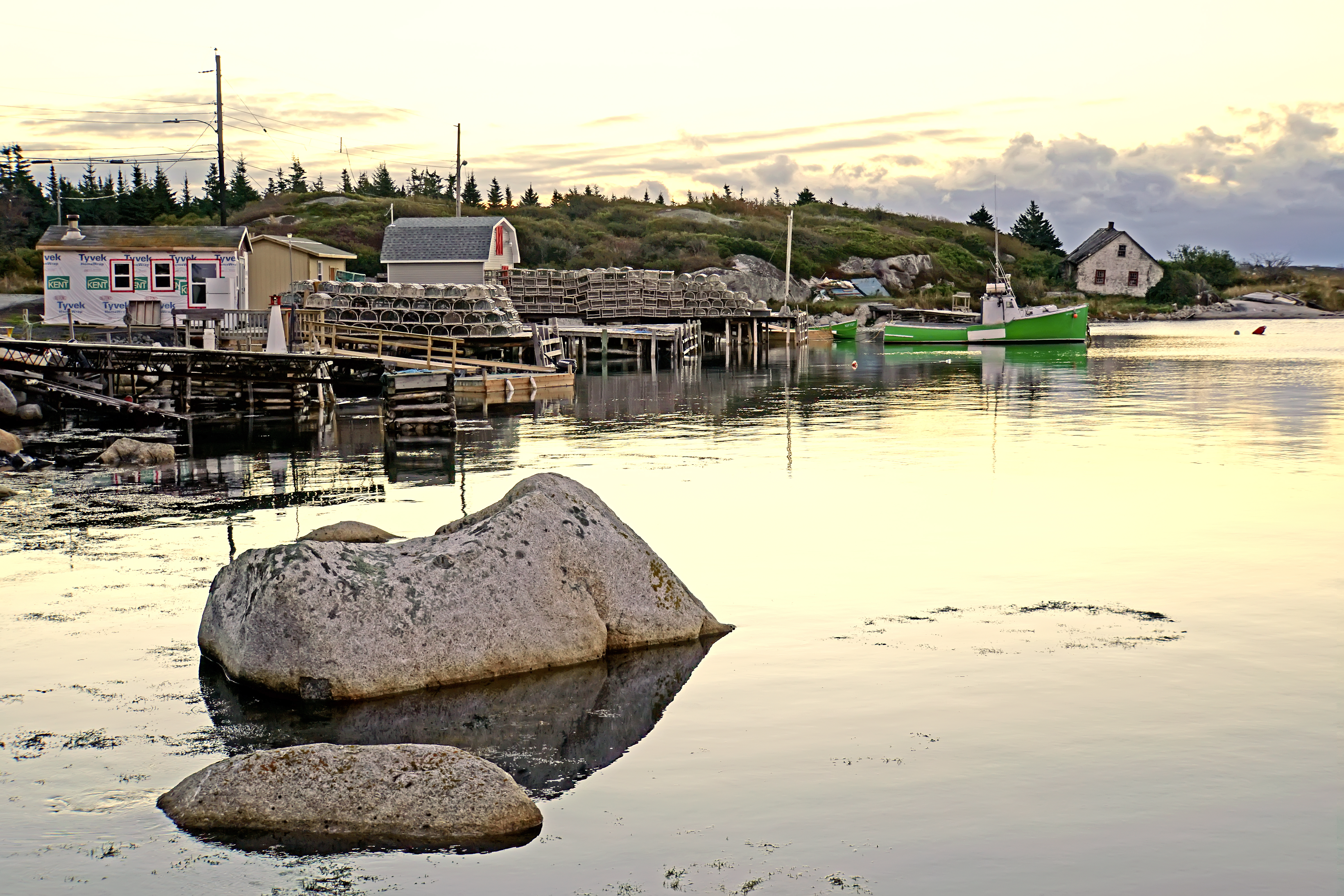

- Location within Nova Scotia
- Coordinates: 44°27′14″N 63°43′37″W
- Country: Canada
- Province: Nova Scotia
- Municipality: Halifax
- Time zone: UTC-4 (AST)
  - Summer (DST): UTC-3 (ADT)
- Postal code: B3T
- Area code: 902
- GNBC Code: CAVWL

Lower Prospect is an unincorporated community in the Canadian province of Nova Scotia. It is located in Halifax Regional Municipality on the Chebucto Peninsula. The area was the location of the 1873 sinking of the SS Atlantic.
