= Michael Mahonen =

Canadian actor, director and screen writer

- Born: 27 April 1964 (age 61); Kirkland Lake, Ontario, Canada
- Occupation(s): Actor, Screenwriter
- Years active: 1990–present

Michael Mahonen (born 27 April 1964) is a Canadian actor, director, and screen writer.

== History ==
Mahonen has Finnish ancestry. After graduating from the Theatre Arts Program at George Brown College in 1989, he auditioned for a young company formed for the Citadel Theatre in Edmonton. His first job as a professional actor involved the role of James Keller in "The Miracle Worker," as well as the roles of Lucius and Popilious Lena in "Julius Caesar."

In 1990, Mahonen was chosen for the role of Gus Pike for the CBC Television program Road to Avonlea. He garnered three Gemini Award nominations in 1993, 1994, and 1995 for his work on the television series. In 1992, he starred as a jazz trumpet player with Billy Dee Williams in the film Giant Steps. He then played Lee Colgan in the CBC miniseries Conspiracy of Silence, directed by Francis Mankiewicz.

In 1994, Mahonen co-starred with Michael Riley in the television special "The Facts Behind the Helsinki Roccamatios". He played the character of Paul, a young man dying of the AIDS virus after contracting it from a blood transfusion a few years earlier. In the summer of 1994, he played the role of Jacob Mercer in "Salt Water Moon". This was part of David French's Mercer family saga set in Newfoundland.

Mahonen also guest-starred in numerous American and Canadian television projects, including an episode of Star Trek: Voyager entitled "Nemesis", in which he played a humanoid named "Brone." In 1997, Mahonen starred in Judith Thompson's "Sled" at Toronto's Tarragon Theatre. He then returned to film, co-starring in the 1998 film Captured. He went on to make several more films including Blindness.

In 2003, Mahonen began work on his first feature film Sandstorm. The film involved a fact-based drama about the persecution of Falun Gong practitioners in China. He wrote, directed, and produced the entire film for under $5,000. The cast was made up of volunteers. The film received 29 awards including Best Feature Film, Best Drama, Best Director, and Best Screenplay.

== Filmography ==
Actor
Year	Title	Role	Notes
1990-1996	Road to Avonlea	Gus Pike	28 episodes
1991	Rin Tin Tin: K-9 Cop	Norman Baker	Episode: "Abused Child"
1991	Conspiracy of Silence	Lee Colgan	TV movie
1992	Top Cops	Keith Gordon	Episode: "Robert Ruh"
1992	Personal Effects	Philip	Short film
1992	Giant Steps	Arvo Leek	
1992	By Way of the Stars	Ben Davis	TV mini-series
1992	Secret Service	Chandler	Episode: "Social Insecurity/Inside Job"
1993	Collateral Damage	Nick	Short film
1997	Star Trek: Voyager	Brone	Episode: "Nemesis"
1997	Viper	Dirk Hanley	Episode: "Wilderness Run"
1998	Captured	Joey Breed	Video
2000	Canada: A People's History	John Jewitt	Episode: "When the World Began..."
2000	Strong Medicine	Anonymous / Joe	Episode: "Second Look"
2001	An Intrigue of Manners	Dorimant	
2003	A Taste of Shakespeare	Malcolm	Episode: "Macbeth"
2004	This Is Wonderland	Patrick Bellamy	Episode: "1.5"
2007	All Hat	Steve Allman	
2008	Blindness	Sergeant	
2009	Crangle's Collision	Sydney	Short film

Director & writer
Year	Title	Notes
2004	Sandstorm	2005 - Won - Humanitarian Film Award; 2004 - Won - Grand Jury Prize - Best Feature Film
