= André Mathieu, musicien =

1993 film by Jean-Claude Labrecque

- Directed by: Jean-Claude Labrecque
- Produced by: Jean-Claude Labrecque; Micheline Blais
- Cinematography: Jean-Claude Labrecque
- Edited by: Dominique Fortin
- Production company: National Film Board of Canada
- Release date: November 19, 1993
- Running time: 80 minutes
- Country: Canada
- Language: French

André Mathieu, musicien is a Canadian documentary film, directed by Jean-Claude Labrecque and released in 1993. The film is a portrait of Canadian classical pianist and composer André Mathieu.

The film premiered in Montreal in November 1993. It was screened in February 1994 as the opening film of the inaugural Hot Docs Canadian International Documentary Festival.

The film was a Genie Award nominee for Best Feature Length Documentary at the 15th Genie Awards in 1994.
