= André Mathieu =

Canadian pianist and composer

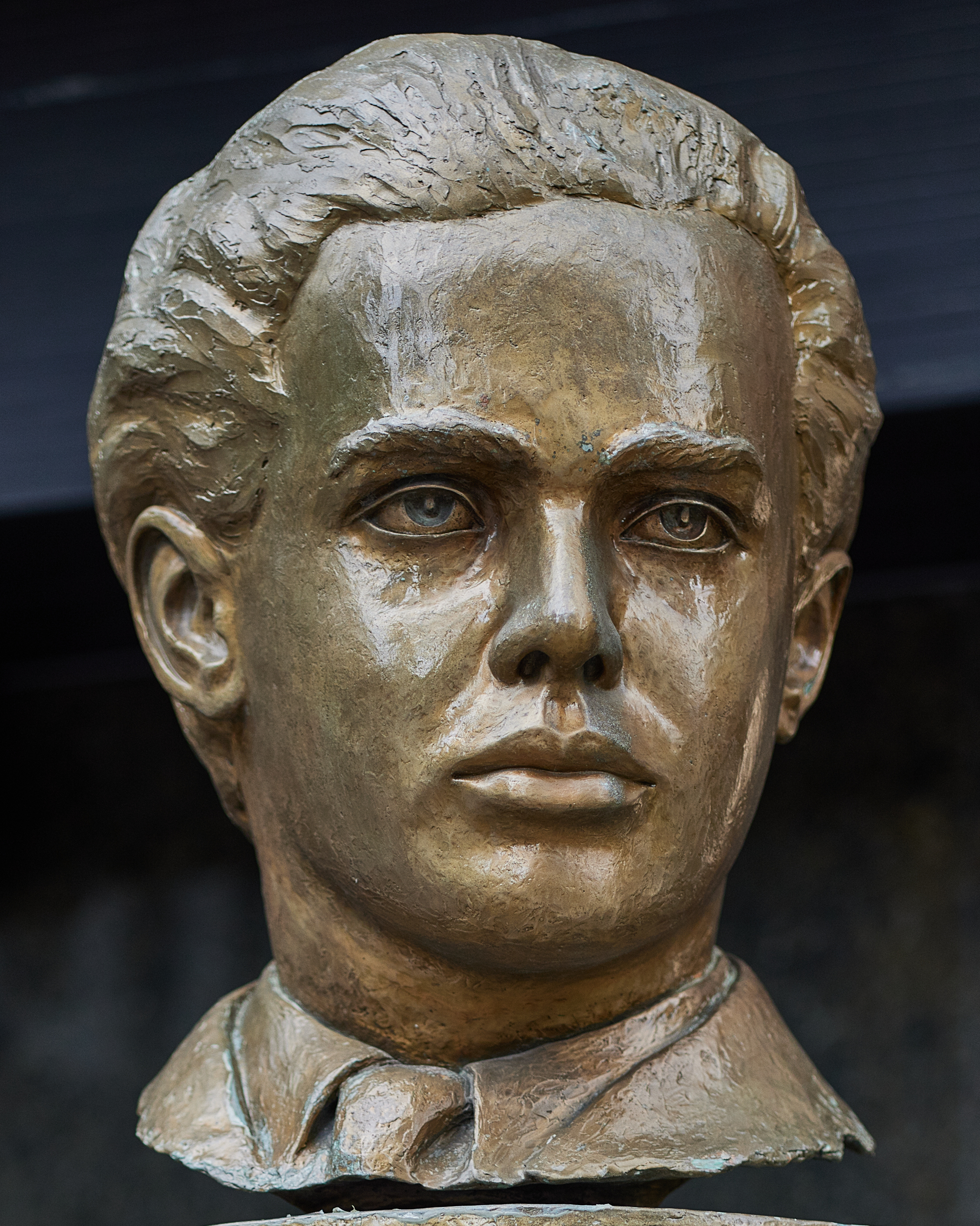
Sculpture of Mathieu by Céline and Jean-Guy White

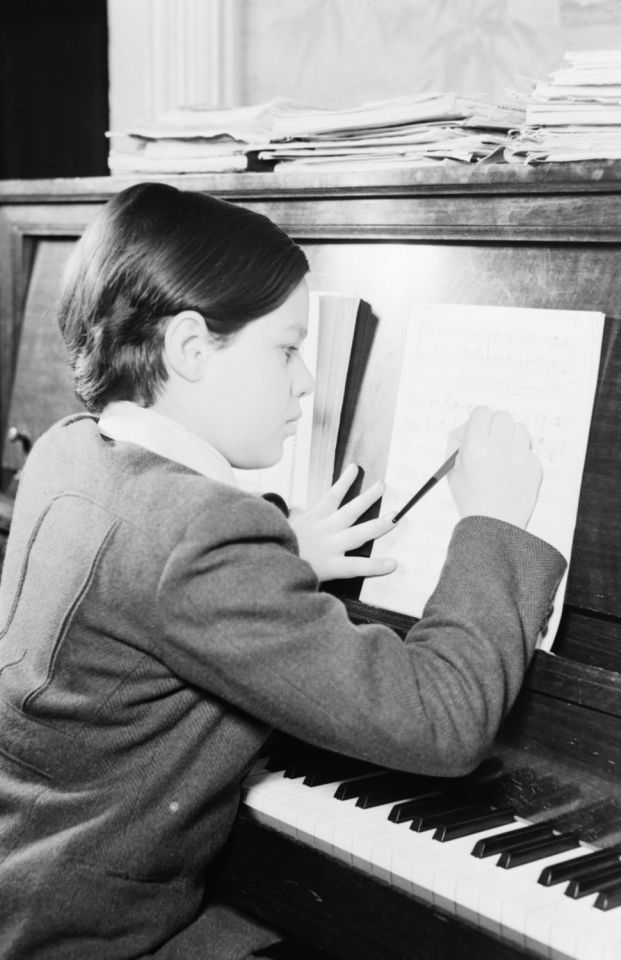
André Mathieu at eleven years of age

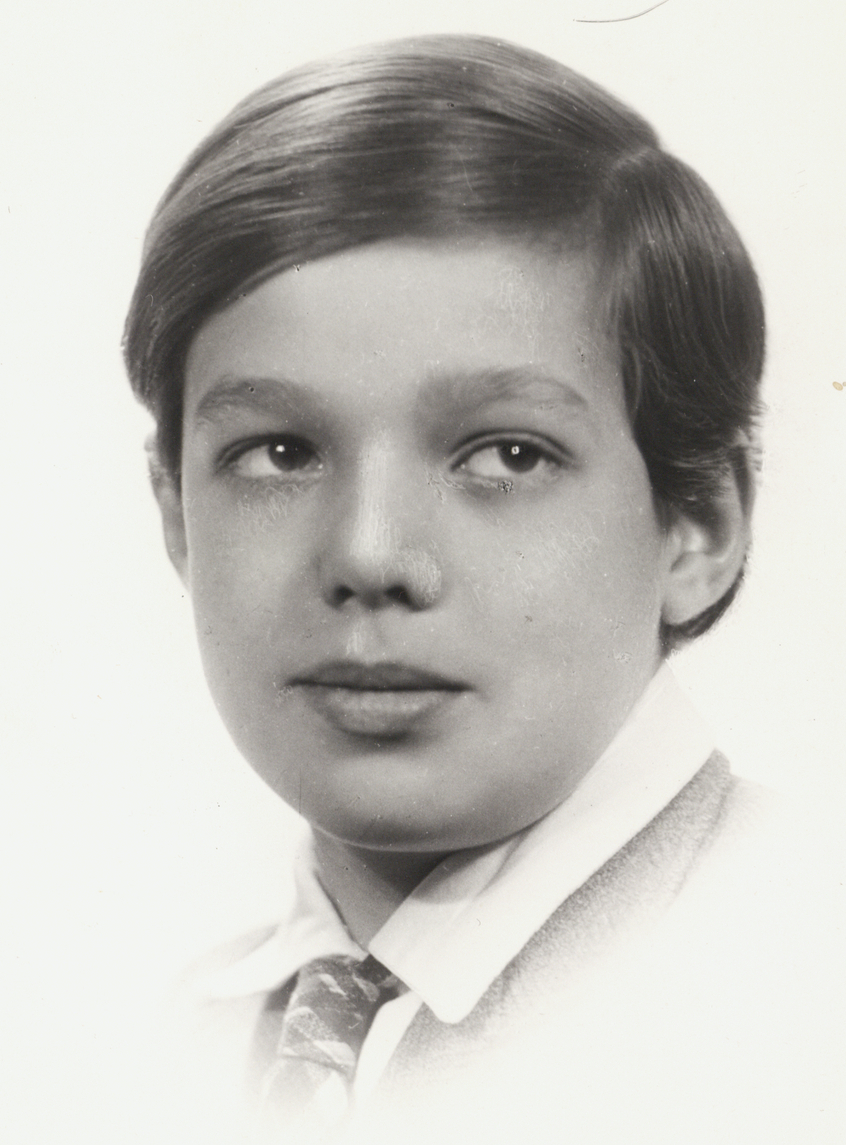

André Mathieu (18 February 1929 – 2 June 1968) was a Canadian pianist and composer.

== Life ==
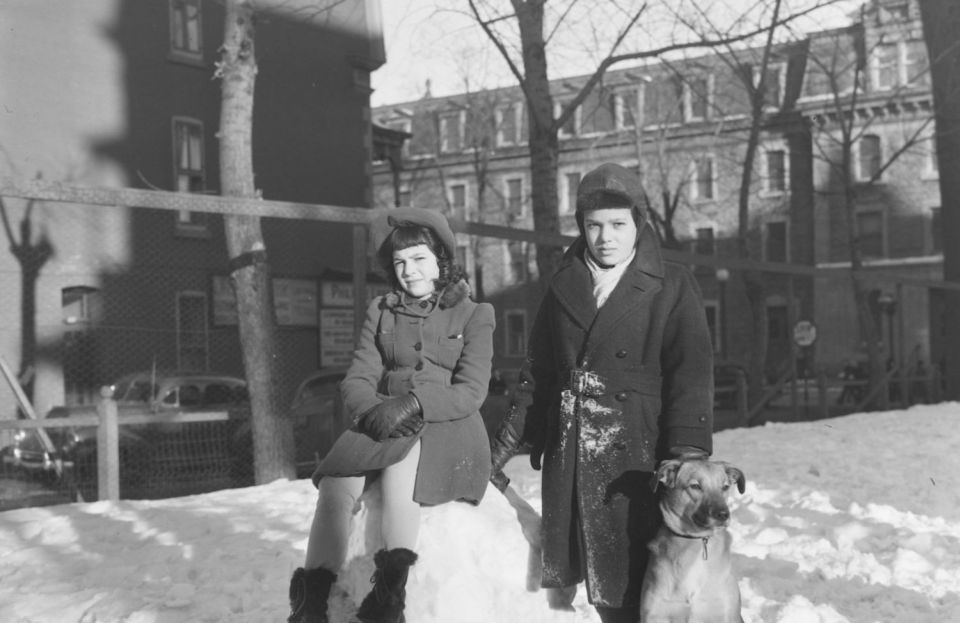
André Mathieu at 11 with his sister

Mathieu was born René André Rodolphe Mathieu on 18 February 1929 in Montreal, Quebec, Canada, in the parish of Saint-Jacques-le-Majeur to father Rodolphe Mathieu and mother Wilhemine Gagnon-Mathieu. His father was a music teacher and composer, and his mother a cellist and teacher. Mathieu was fascinated by the world of music from an early age, and received his first music lessons from his father. Mathieu as a child was unusually precocious. He spoke his first words at the age of 4 months and took his first steps before seven months.

Rodolphe Mathieu was at first reluctant to teach his son music, and forbade him to touch the piano. This is because the senior Mathieu regarded music as a pauper's profession. Even so, Rodolphe Mathieu resigned himself to teaching his son music, because he recognized the exceptional talent in Mathieu. A child prodigy with abilities in composition, Mathieu began composing at the age of 4. At age 6 Mathieu gave his first recital of his own composition at the Ritz Carlton Hotel in Montreal, Quebec, on 25 February 1935. In 1936 Mathieu performed his Concertino No.1 for Piano and Orchestra as a soloist on the CBC network. He was later given a grant by the Quebec government that enabled him to go to Paris and study piano with Yves Nat and Mme. Giraud-Latarse. Mathieu also studied harmony and composition with Jacques de la Presle. In December 1936 Mathieu gave a recital of his works at Salle Chopin-Pleyel, and again at Salle Gaveau on 26 March 1939. His recitals as a soloist were received very enthusiastically by the Parisian critics. They unanimously agreed that André Mathieu was a "Canadian Mozart".

Mathieu returned to Montreal for the holidays, but due to the outbreak of war he could not return to Europe. Instead, Mathieu performed in a series of recitals in Canada and the United States of America, and gave a performance at the New York City Town Hall on 3 February 1940. He remained in New York with his family until 1943, studying composition with Harold Morris and fulfilling concert and radio engagements. In 1941 when he was not yet 12 years old, Mathieu won the first prize at the composition competition to commemorate the 100th anniversary of the New York Philharmonic Orchestra. He also played his Concertino No. 2 for piano and orchestra at Carnegie Hall. Mathieu also played his compositions at a concert of the League of Composers.

In 1943 he returned to Montreal and gave numerous concerts performing Bach, Beethoven, Chopin, Liszt, Debussy and Ravel, as well as his own works.

In 1946 he left Montreal for Paris to study composition with Arthur Honegger and piano with Jules Gentil. Unfortunately the trip did not go as planned. Mathieu was disappointed by his teachers, bored and short of money. He felt lonely, homesick and vulnerable. In 1947 he returned to Montreal a changed man, tired and exhausted. He took part in Pianothons to break records at events. He also began teaching and continued to compose. During the following years he succumbed to alcoholism. He married Marie-Ange Massicotte in 1960, but their marriage was short-lived due to André's alcoholism and emotional problems. André died suddenly at the age of 39 on 2 June 1968 and was entombed at the Notre Dame des Neiges Cemetery in Montreal. He was a prolific composer and left behind a wide range of music.

The welcoming song and the official theme-music of the 1976 Montreal Olympics was arranged by Vic Vogel from Mathieu's works. The André-Mathieu Club was founded in 1942 at Trois-Rivières by Mme Anaïs Allard-Rousseau to promote an interest in music among youth in the community. The club eventually became part of the Youth and Music Canada (YMC) or Jeunesses musicales du Canada (JMC). In October 1979 the Salle André-Mathieu opened as part of Montmorency College in Laval, Quebec, in honour of Mathieu's talent and contribution to music. In 1987 a street was named after Mathieu in the Pointe-aux-Trembles district in Montreal. Another street was also named in memory of his great work, in Mirabel, Quebec, in 2006. The renowned pianist and classical music activist Alain Lefèvre has popularized several of André Mathieu's works.

== Works ==
As a composer Mathieu's style leaned towards the late Romantic school of Rachmaninov, and his music was influenced by Debussy as well. Mathieu wrote many works for piano. Among the compositions of his youth are the Trois Études (1933), Les Gros Chars (1934), Procession d'éléphants (1934), Trois Pièces pittoresques (1936), Hommage à Mozart enfant (1937), and Les Mouettes (1938).

In 1939 he wrote two suites for twin pianos: Les Vagues and Saisons canadiennes.

In 1943 he wrote a third concerto for piano and orchestra titled Concerto Romantique (also known as the Concerto de Québec). The piece was performed by Neil Chotem in the Canadian film La Forteresse. His Concerto No. 3, which he performed in 1948 with CBC Montreal orchestra under Jean-Marie Beaudet, was presented in 1977 in Tunisia by pianist André-Sébastien Savoie and the Tunis Orchestra conducted by Raymond Dessaints.

He also composed a fourth concerto around the year 1947, considered by some as a more mature and original work, which is currently being rediscovered and has received its first integral recording in 2008 from the Quebec music company Analekta. The composer seemed quite attached to this piece; for a long time, it was part of the concerts he gave, and one of his last great masterpieces for orchestra, the "Rhapsodie romantique" ("Romantic rhapsody"), is an arrangement of its second movement. This Piano Concerto No.4 appears on several of Mathieu's concert programs between 1948 and 1955, but for many years there was no complete record of its score. However, Mathieu had a performance of this piece recorded on 78 rpm discs at a concert on 7 December 1950, in the Ritz Carlton of Montreal, and gave the recording to a woman friend. In 2005, while Alain Lefevre's work to revive Mathieu's work was underway, the woman met Lefevre backstage after a Concerto de Québec, and delivered to him the recordings. Lefevre worked with conductor and composer Gilles Bellemare to reconstruct and publicize the composition, and on 10 December 2013, 70 years after the last of Mathieu's three appearances on stage at Carnegie Hall in New York City, Lefevre appeared at Carnegie Hall and gave the New York premiere of Mathieu's previously lost Piano Concerto No.4.

Among Mathieu's works for piano and violin are Fantaisie brésilienne, a sonata, a berceuse, and Complainte. Mathieu's vocal works include Le ciel est si bleu, Hymne du Bloc Populaire, Les Chères Mains (1946), and Quatre Mélodies (1948).

== Legacy ==
He is the subject of Jean-Claude Labrecque's 1993 documentary film André Mathieu, musicien, and his childhood was dramatized by Luc Dionne in the 2010 biographical drama film The Child Prodigy (L'enfant prodige).
