= For the Moment (film) =

1993 Canadian film

- Theatrical release poster
- Directed by: Aaron Kim Johnston
- Written by: Aaron Kim Johnston
- Produced by: Jack Clements; Joe MacDonald (co-producer); Ches Yetman (co-producer); Aaron Kim Johnston (John Aaron Features II Inc.); Rogers Telefund; Peter Lhotka (Production Manager)
- Starring: Russell Crowe; Christianne Hirt; Wanda Cannon; Scott Kraft; Sara McMillan; Peter Outerbridge
- Cinematography: Ian Elkin
- Edited by: Rita Roy
- Music by: Victor Davies
- Production companies: John Aaron Features II Inc.; Manitoba Film and Sound; National Film Board of Canada; Rogers Communications; Téléfilm Canada
- Distributed by: John Aaron Productions; 20th Century Fox Home Entertainment
- Release date: October 1993 (Canada)
- Running time: 120 minutes (USA)
- Country: Canada
- Language: English
- Box office: $121,548 (USA)

For the Moment is a 1993 Canadian period romance film written and directed by Aaron Kim Johnston and starring Russell Crowe and Christianne Hirt. The plot revolves around airmen training in rural Manitoba, Canada, with the British Commonwealth Air Training Plan during the Second World War. The main focus of the story is the wartime romance between Russell Crowe's character and a local girl. Johnston was inspired to write the screenplay based upon the stories of his father who was an instructor and bomber pilot in the war, and his mother's experiences as a young woman on the home front.

== Plot ==
In the summer of 1942, something is dramatically changing for the small community of Brandon, Manitoba as hundreds of young men from all over the world descend on this sleepy hamlet. In this newly found excitement of meeting newcomers, Lill (Christianne Hirt), a young prairie farm wife whose husband is already overseas for two years, and LAC Lachlan Curry (Russell Crowe), a gallant Australian airman are fated to meet. He has come to train at the Royal Canadian Air Force air base nearby to become a pilot. His friend, LAC Johnny Crouch (Peter Outerbridge) who has struck up a relationship with Lill's younger sister, Kate (Sara McMillan), introduces Lachlan to Lill.

During a languid moment, Lachlan recites to Lill the poem, "High Flight" by fellow airman, John Gillespie Magee, Jr. which epitomizes what he is going through in his training. Lill recognizes the poem as it had been widely distributed after the death of the young airman who had penned it. The young lovers also have a kinship with another unlikely pairing, Betsy (Wanda Cannon), a bootlegging charmer who sells more than alcohol and also has a husband away in the army and two children to look after, and Zeek Williams (Scott Kraft), the flying station's chief flight instructor from Chicago.

The short period that they have together is punctuated by the strain of dangerous wartime training and their inevitable realization that there is little time left for them. Lachlan has to deal with death from all sides, first when "Scotty" (Robert G. Slade), the trainee who bunks next to him, commits suicide. More devastating is the death of Lill's brother, Dennis (Kelly Proctor) that leads her to a fateful decision to end their relationship, and her sister to cancel wedding plans. When Zeek crashes on the edge of the field, he extracts a cruel promise from Lachlan who later seeks out Betsy to tell her what he had to do. At the wings parade, a farewell to the trainees who have earned their wings who will be shortly sent off to war, Lachlan and Lill are unable to reconcile, but Kate remains true to Johnny, saying she will be there when he comes back. Across the parade square, Lachlan and Lill share a final moment, saying goodbye quietly, with a phrase he has taught her, "Fair dinkum." (Note: As one of the Australian slang words and terms Lachlan taught Lill, that he says, means: "honest, real, truth.")

== Cast ==
As appearing in screen credits (main roles identified):

| Actor | Role |
|---|---|
| Russell Crowe | LAC Lachlan Curry |
| Christianne Hirt | Lill Anderson |
| Wanda Cannon | Betsy |
| Scott Kraft | Flight Sergeant Zeek Williams |
| Sara McMillan | Kate Anderson |
| Peter Outerbridge | LAC Johnny Crouch |
| Bruce Boa | Mr. Anderson |
| Katelynd Johnston | Marion |
| Tyler Woods | Charlie |
| John Bekavac | "Dipper" |
| Robert G. Slade | "Scotty" |
| Kelly Proctor | Dennis Anderson |

== Production ==
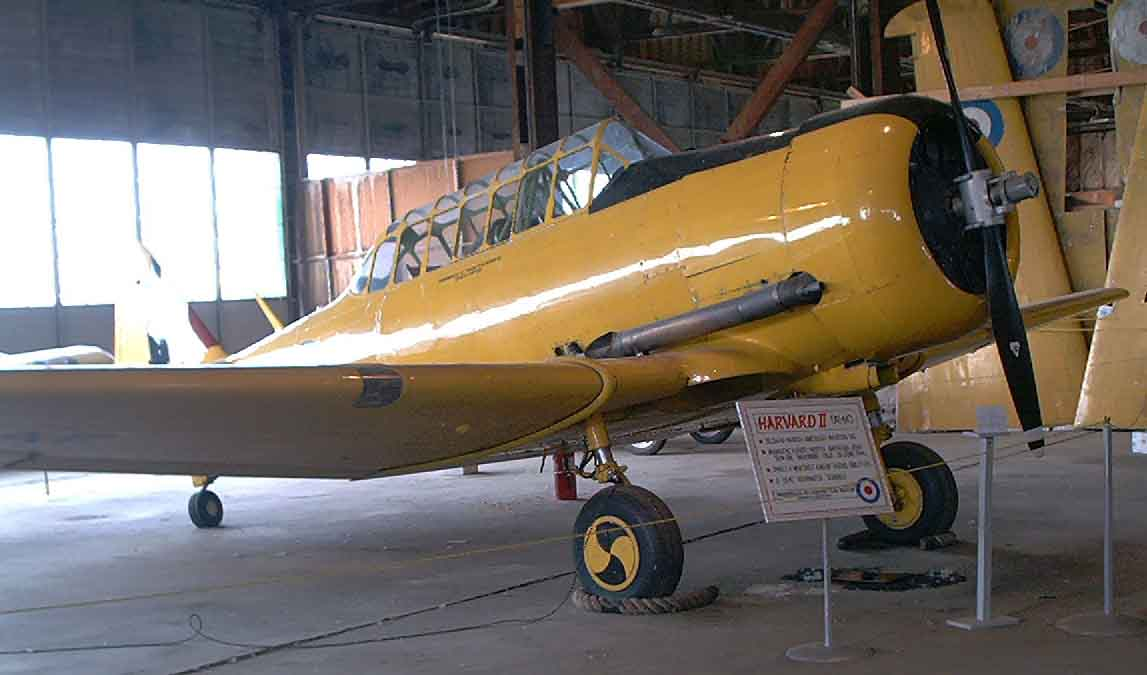
RCAF Harvards were used as a trainer aircraft by thousands of Commonwealth aviators from 1940 onwards. Harvard II from the BCATP Museum in Brandon, Manitoba, Canada used in the film.

Director Aaron Kim Johnston had a serendipitous moment in selecting the lead actor. Russell Crowe's name was on the top of a list and although he had not been acting long, the initial reviews of his earlier films were promising, with a handful of awards for his roles as both supporting and lead actor. (Note: Crowe had a unique connection to the period as his uncle went through air training in Canada. At the end of the production, Crowe set up a special screening of the film for his uncle and his veteran friends in New Zealand.) (Note: When Crowe's character is first introduced, an "inside joke" occurs as he complains about being described as a "Kiwi," his original birthplace.) Johnston said the actor’s combination of presence, magnetism and skill results in a "real person to put in front of the camera. He’s quite a perfectionist – he’s very professional," Johnston said. "He approaches his craft and work with great intensity and preparation and a sense of perfectionism that is consummate. That’s why he is where he is." "... I think he likes to be a maverick." (Note: Crowe considered the film his "big break" and has remained friends with Johnston.)

With principal photography taking place over August–September 1992, one of the first jobs for the production was to scout possible locations. The film was shot at former Royal Canadian Air Force stations in Manitoba used in the British Commonwealth Air Training Plan, including Brandon Municipal Airport, Brandon Airport's auxiliary aerodrome at Chater, and Rivers. The Brandon Commonwealth Air Training Plan Museum became the primary filming location, utilizing its extensive collection of period equipment and aircraft. The museum's aircraft are mainly static and although some were flight-ready, refurbishing and obtaining insurance was required to fly some of the types, including the de Havilland Tiger Moth and North American Harvard trainers, featured in key aerial scenes. Farms around Brandon stood in for various film locales while other Brandon landmarks including a church and the main street area was actually Carberry, Manitoba. Local residents were prominently involved as extras in many of the town scenes. The dance hall sequence was filmed in Albert Johnson's Palladium, a long-time dance emporium on Rosser Avenue, Brandon, which resulted in the partial refurbishing of the site. A swing band provided the music.

=== Aircraft used in the production ===
- Avro Anson Mk V
- Bristol Bolingbroke IVT
- Cessna Crane IA
- de Havilland Canada DH.82C Tiger Moth
- Douglas A-26B Invader (Note: The Douglas A-26 Invader was filling in for an RCAF Douglas A-20 Havoc, although none were stationed in Canada during the war years.)
- North American Harvard II
- Stinson L-5 Sentinel

== Reception ==
Praised for its cinematography, music (the strains of Pachelbel's Canon begins and ends the film) and faithful depiction of the era, the romantic subplots in For the Moment were nonetheless seen as laboured or clumsy. James Berardinelli characterized it as "Nicely photographed and appealingly acted ... The film is obvious, and occasionally clumsy ... (yet) 'For the Moment' says something about the ephemeral nature of human existence, the uncertainty of everyone's future, and the longing we often experience for the 'road not traveled'." Kim Williamson had similar reservations, indicating that while "... some scenes and their dialogue are electric with simple humanity ... Still, 'For the Moment,' a movie about moments, is only made of them." Stephen Holden's review in The New York Times identified the same dichotomy in describing the film as "better at portraying the intimacy of families and lovers than at telling a story ... (although) 'For the Moment' satisfies a sweet tooth with such calm and intelligent deliberation that you won't leave feeling as though you have just indulged in a guilty pleasure."

== Awards ==
For the Moment received Genie Award nominations for Scott Kraft as Best Supporting Actor and Wanda Cannon for Best Supporting Actress at the 15th Genie Awards. Andrew Deskin and Mark Andrew Webb went on to win the Best Art Direction Award at the 1995 Blizzard Awards while the film won the Most Popular Canadian Film Award at the 1993 Vancouver International Film Festival.

== Home video ==
After its formal premiere in 1993 at the Vancouver International Film Festival, For the Moment was first released in Canada and later released in the United States in 1996. (Note: The actual premiere took place in Brandon shortly after final editing.) A home video was released in VHS format in 2003, followed up by a DVD widescreen release in 2004, offering English and Spanish subtitles. A later Canadian DVD version provided a small number of special features including behind-the-scenes photographs and biographies/filmographies on Aaron Kim Johnson, Christianne Hirt and Russell Crowe. (Note: The recent highly-edited Canadian DVD version distributed by Les Films Séville lops 25 minutes from the film, including Crowe's recitation of "High Flight" and his rendition of "Waltzing Matilda".) As of 2013, the video versions are no longer available as the distribution rights to the production are no longer in effect.
