= In a Class of His Own =

- Written by: Robert Munic
- Directed by: Robert Munic
- Starring: Lou Diamond Phillips
- Music by: Sharon Farber
- Country of origin: United States
- Original language: English

Production
- Executive producers: Robert Halmi Jr. Jon Turtle; Wendy Finerman
- Producer: Lindsay Williams
- Cinematography: Ron Stannett
- Editor: Robin Katz
- Running time: 87 minutes
- Production company: Hallmark Entertainment

Original release
- Network: Showtime
- Release: October 17, 1999

In a Class of His Own is a 1999 American made-for-television drama film starring Lou Diamond Phillips and based on a true story. The film originally aired on Showtime on October 17, 1999.

== Plot ==
A high School janitor must go back to school to get his GED in order to keep his job.

== Cast ==
- Lou Diamond Phillips as Ricardo "Rich" Donato
- Lee Jay Bamberry as Freddy
- Lenno Britos as Mr. Guiterrez
- A.J. Buckley as Jake Matteson
- Cara Buono as Sherry Donato
- Joan Chen as Linda Ching
