= Folk Art Found Me =

1993 Canadian documentary film

- Directed by: Alex Busby
- Produced by: Marilyn Belec; Alex Busby; Tricia Fish; Mike Mahoney
- Cinematography: Les Krizsan; Mark Van Alstyne
- Edited by: Angela Baker
- Music by: Sandy Moore; Tom Roach; Paul Simons
- Production companies: National Film Board of Canada; Wisdom Teeth Productions
- Release date: September 15, 1993 (AFF)
- Running time: 30 minutes
- Country: Canada
- Language: English

Folk Art Found Me is a Canadian documentary film, directed by Alex Busby and released in 1993. The film is a portrait of folk artists in Nova Scotia.

The film premiered at the 1993 Atlantic Film Festival, where it won the award for Best Atlantic Documentary. It received a Genie Award nomination for Best Documentary at the 15th Genie Awards in 1994, and was co-winner with Frédéric Back's The Mighty River of the Golden Sheaf Award for Best of Festival at the 1994 Yorkton Film Festival.
