= Jacques de La Presle =

French composer

Jacques la Presle (1888-1969) was a French composer. He won Second Prix at the Prix de Rome in 1920 with his cantata Don Juan. The following year he won the Grand Prix with a cantata Hermione, and departed to spend four years at the Villa Médicis 1922-1925.

la Presle taught at the Paris Conservatory from 1937 to 1958. His students included Antoine Duhamel, Maurice Jarre, and André Mathieu.
