= Les Pots cassés =

1993 film

- Directed by: François Bouvier
- Written by: Gilles Desjardins
- Starring: Gilbert Sicotte
- Release date: 1993
- Running time: 90 minutes
- Country: Canada
- Language: French

Les Pots cassés is a 1993 Canadian drama film directed by François Bouvier. It was entered into the 18th Moscow International Film Festival where Gilles Desjardins won a Diploma for the Script.

== Cast ==
- Gilbert Sicotte as Robert
- Marie Tifo as Marianne
- Marc Messier as Gérald
- Louise Deslières as Céline
- Jean-Marc Parent as Roch
- Raymond Cloutier as Bertrand
- Suzanne Garceau as Libraire
- James Hyndman as Charles
- Bernadette Li as Lylyl
- Hank Hum as Patron du restaurant chinois
