= Lloyd A. Simandl =

Czech-Canadian filmmaker

- Born: Luboš Antonín Šimandl; 1948 or 1950; Cheb, Czechoslovakia
- Occupations: Film director and producer
- Years active: 1977–present
- Known for: Founder and principal of North American Pictures
- Spouse: Sharon Christensen

Lloyd Anthony Simandl (born Luboš Antonín Šimandl in 1948 or 1950) is a Czech-Canadian film director and producer. He began his entertainment career in Canada in the late 1970s, before returning to his native Czech Republic in the mid-90s. He has mainly done business through his companies North American Pictures and North American Releasing. He is best known for low budget action and softcore films. Many of his works dabble in bondage themes, and he later created a label specializing in this type of product called Bound Heat.

== Personal life ==
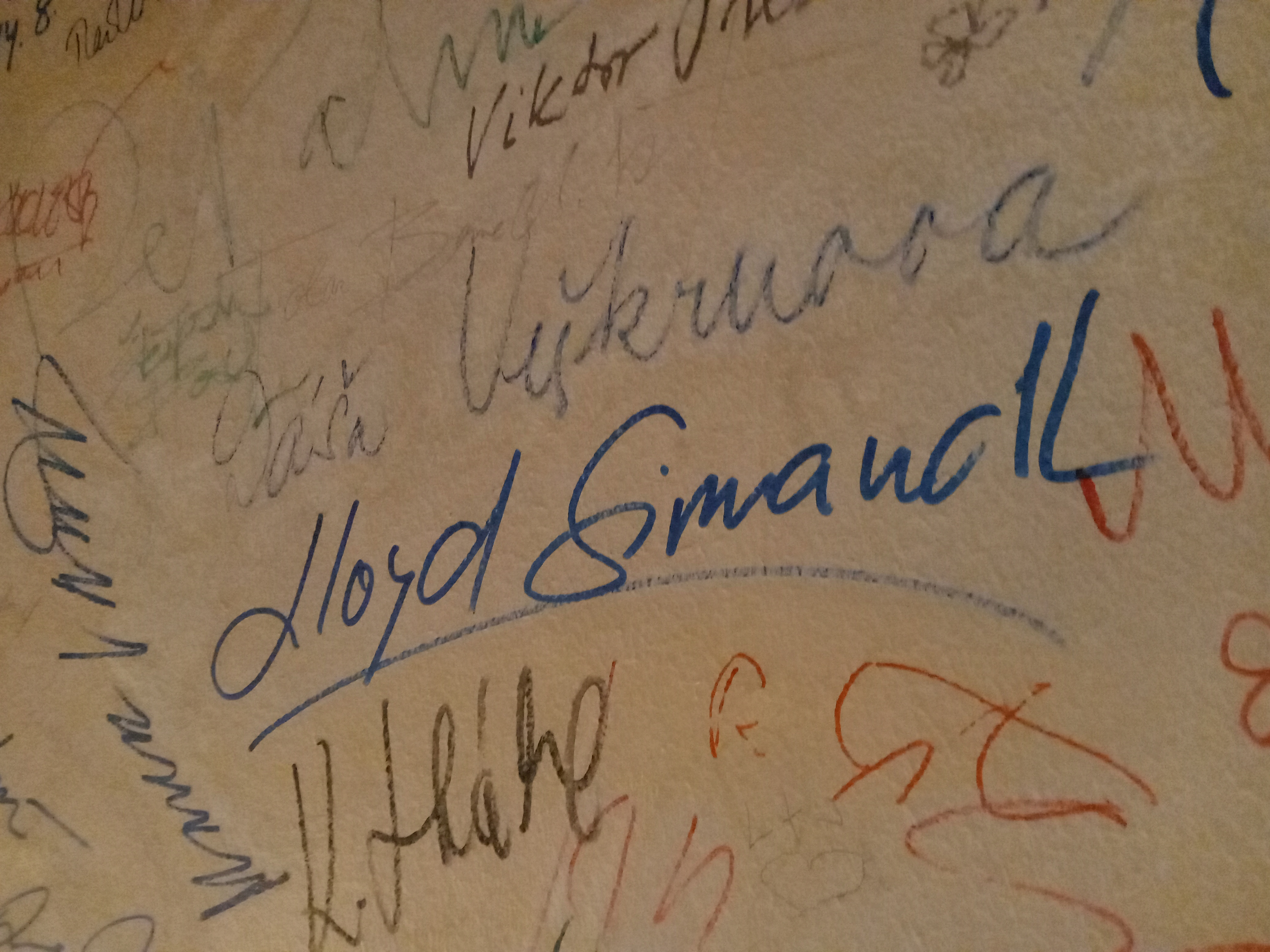
Simandl's signature on a celebrity wall near the MAT cinema in Prague

Simandl was born Luboš Antonín Šimandl in Cheb, in the westernmost part of then Czechoslovakia. He was born 1948 according to some sources, and in 1950 according to others. He attended music school, but was kicked out at 15. He graduated from a high school in České Budějovice, in the southwest of the country. Dreaming of a movie career since he was a small child, he applied to Prague's FAMU, the country's top film school, but was unsuccessful and attended the city's Academy of Fine Arts. In 1968 however, Czechoslovakia was invaded by a Soviet-led military coalition. Simandl moved to Canada and settled in Winnipeg, Manitoba.

He first worked at a shoe factory to learn the English language, before going to medical school. He then moved west and joined the British Columbia Institute of Technology in Burnaby, ascending to the head of the hematology department. Simandl was listed as a faculty member there between 1982 and 1993, when his official status was changed to "on leave," although by the late 1980s he was already dedicating his time to filmmaking. Simandl is married to Sharon Christensen, who has collaborated to many of his films in various capacities.

== Career ==
=== North American Pictures / North American Releasing ===
Simandl established his production company North American Pictures in Winnipeg in 1977. It was also there that he met cameraman and longtime collaborator Michael Mazo. His first film, the softcore Autumn Born starring ill-fated Playboy Playmate Dorothy Stratten, was his only feature shot in Winnipeg, and his next work was done in the Vancouver area. Due to his poor understanding of the distribution business, Simandl lost money on his first film and took several years to regroup. He still found employment churning out some commercials, and even a fitness tape for Vancouver gym owners Ron and Dana Zalko.

To better finance and control his catalogue, Simandl established a sister outlet called North American Releasing in 1984, partnering with University of Alberta business graduate John Curtis, who previously worked for a New York distributor. Both companies are sometimes collectively known as the North American Group. This enabled him to return to features with another roughie, 1986's Ladies of the Lotus. Early on, the company employed some unorthodox tactics, such as advertising for sales positions that required a product purchase in the local classifieds, or repackaging their film Empire of Ash as the non-existent sequel Empire of Ash II. Until the end of the 1980s, Simandl's shoots were 16 mm affairs, which he essentially treated as a summer hobby. However, according to trade publication Playback, NAR was and remained for years the only Western Canadian representative at international markets.

==== Partnership with EGM ====
During the late 1980s and early 1990s, Simandl and Curtis formed an alliance with EGM Film International, a British company whose owners came from a similar, do-it-yourself background. The resulting slate, which included North American's first 35 mm, million-dollar film Xtro II, was partly financed through the CAD$2 million IPO of a sister company called Excalibur Pictures. It was the largest such operation in B.C. film history at that point. In 1993, Curtis left NAR to form Everest Pictures. After his departure, James Westwell and A. William Smyth of film accounting firm TVD, who had co-produced several NAR films, acquired a fifty percent stake in Simandl's company.

==== First Czech productions and relocation ====
In 1992, Simandl returned to his customary niche with Chained Heat II, a sequel to the 1983 women-in-prison film, and his first to be shot in the Czech Republic. For his early productions there, he partnered with local company Public 21 Cinema. He briefly alternated between Canadian and Czech-based projects, but by 1994, the emergence of Vancouver as a major location had made it unaffordable to smaller producers like him. He chose to relocate his entire filming operation to his native country, rather than become dependent on Canadian public subsidies. That year, he re-incorporated his production outfit North American Pictures in Prague, estimating that he could save around 40 percent of his budgets by outsourcing there. He also opened an office for North American Releasing in Los Angeles.

==== Establishment of North American Studios ====
In 1995, Simandl bought a former Jednotné zemědělské družstvo (lit. 'United Agricultural Cooperative') storage plant in Milín in the countryside of Central Bohemia. The building's four warehouses became the four main soundstages, while the side corridor was repurposed as an additional set for tunnel-like environments. The thick walls, originally meant to prevent vegetables from freezing during winter, proved ideal for pyrotechnics. At 4,650 m^{2} (50,100 sq ft), including 3,600 m^{2} (39,000 sq ft) of indoor filming space, it was touted as the largest independent film facility in the country, and the second largest overall after Barrandov Studios. 1995's Dangerous Prey was the first movie shot on the premises. Simandl further contemplated the purchase of a medieval castle near Prague to use as a regular location, but there is no indication that it materialized. North American also assembled an in-house effects team, with facilities allowing for motion control, blue screen, CGI creation and model building. For CGI, it was often supported by a Prague graphic design agency named Frame.

==== Continued activities ====
In 1996–97, NAR's legal counsel Michelle Gahagan was made a partner in the company, soon becoming Simandl's only co-shareholder and COO. By 1998, the company employed a staff of about fifteen across Canada and the Czech Republic. In July of that year, Gahagan announced that North American was considering a public offering worth about CAD$10 million on the Toronto Stock Exchange. In 1999 however, she left for the short-lived Sextant Entertainment, leaving Simandl as the company's sole principal. Rumors of a market introduction resurfaced in September 2000, but did not materialize either. Around the same time, Simandl re-hired Suzanne Daley, a former NAR vice-president, and tasked her with building the company's sales operation in Prague.

Using his Canadian connections, Simandl lobbied to lure other producers to the Czech Republic, and managed to get part of the Peace Arch Entertainment series The Immortal outsourced to him. He also teamed up with stuntman turned producer Danny Virtue for Ariana's Quest, a made-for-TV movie starring Rena Mero, which they hoped would spawn a series in the mold of Xena: Warrior Princess. However, the little seen pilot was not picked up, and the relationship with Peace Arch, who was again the intended buyer, ended in litigation.

By the early 2000s, the VHS rental market that was friendliest to Simandl's action films was shrinking fast. The producer scaled back his operations and focused squarely on his go-to brand of white slavery erotica, this time with a historical slant. As an outlet for this content, he created a sublabel of North American Pictures called Boundheat. From the mid-2000s, he only attempted a handful of non-adult co-productions, mostly with companies helmed by his former NAR right hand man John Curtis. Among them was another attempt at a historical TV series, The Lost Legion. That did not pan out, although two test episodes were repackaged as a 2014 straight-to-video feature, which ended up with Lionsgate in the U.S. By the second half of the 2010s, the Milín studios were available for sale.

=== BritCan Entertainment ===
In 2020, the former North American Studios were acquired by BritCan Media, a new company co-founded by former NAR president John Curtis. Simandl was appointed head of studio operations for BritCan.

== Selected filmography ==
Year	Title	Credited as		Notes
Year	Title	Director	Producer	Notes
1983	Autumn Born	Yes	Yes	Filmed in 1979
1983	Ron Zalko Workout	Yes	Yes	Instructional program
1986	Ladies of the Lotus	Yes	Yes	
1986	Possession: Until Death Do You Part	No	Executive only	
1987	Empire of Ash	Yes	Yes	Re-released as Empire of Ash II
1988	Empire of Ash III	Yes	Yes	
1989	Slow Burn	No	Executive only	
1991	Xtro II: The Second Encounter	No	Yes	
1991	Beyond the Silhouette	Yes	Yes	Also known as Ultimate Desires
1992	Project Shadowchaser	No	Executive only	
1993	The Runner	No	Executive only	Also known as Escape from Survival Zone
1993	Chained Heat 2	Yes	Yes	
1993	Time Runner	No	Yes	
1994	Crackerjack	No	Yes	
1995	Dangerous Prey	Yes	Executive only	
1995	Heaven's Tears	Yes	No	
1996	Downdraft	No	Yes	
1997	Sleeping Dogs	No	Yes	
1997	Dead Fire	No	Yes	
1997	Hostage Train	No	Yes	Also known as Crackerjack 2
1998	Chained Heat 3: Hell Mountain	No	Yes	Also known as Caged Rage
1998	Act of War	No	Yes	
1999	Escape Velocity	Yes	Yes	
1999	Lethal Target	Yes	Yes	
2000	Fatal Conflict	Yes	Yes	
2000	Crackerjack 3	Yes	Yes	
2000	Last Stand	Yes	Yes	
2001	The Immortal	No	Executive only	Television series 5 episodes
2002	Deadly Engagement	Yes	Yes	Also known as Omega Force
2002	Killer Love	Yes	Yes	
2002	Starfire Mutiny	Yes	Yes	
2002	Ariana's Quest	Yes	Yes	Backdoor pilot for unproduced series
2003	Sins of the Realm	Yes	Yes	Also known as Slaves of the Realm
2004	Ripper 2: Letter from Within	Yes	Yes	
2005	Within	No	Yes	
2009	The Cycle	No	Yes	Also known as The Devil's Ground
2014	The Lost Legion	No	Yes	Re-edit of two episodes intended for an unmade TV series
