= List of Canadian films of 1994 =

This is a list of Canadian films which were released in 1994:

Title	Director	Cast	Genre	Notes
Arrowhead	Peter Lynch	Don McKellar	Short mockumentary	
Avalanche	Paul Shapiro	Michael Gross, Deanna Milligan	Drama	
Boulevard	Penelope Buitenhuis	Rae Dawn Chong, Kari Wuhrer, Lou Diamond Phillips	Crime thriller	
Camilla	Deepa Mehta	Jessica Tandy, Bridget Fonda, Elias Koteas, Maury Chaykin	Drama	
The Confessional (Le Confessionnal)	Robert Lepage	Lothaire Bluteau, Patrick Goyette, Jean-Louis Millette, Kristin Scott Thomas, Ron Burrage	Drama	Genie Awards – Picture, Director, Art Direction, Claude Jutra Award; Canada/ France/U.K. co-production; references filming of Hitchcock’s I Confess in Quebec City
Chili's Blues (C'était le 12 du 12, et Chili avait les blues)	Charles Binamé	Lucie Laurier, Roy Dupuis, Pierre Curzi	Drama	
The Circle Game	Brigitte Berman	Marnie McPhail, Janet-Laine Green, Albert Schultz, Tom McCamus	Drama	
Crack Me Up	Bashar Shbib	Daphna Kastner, Mary Crosby	Drama	Made with U.S. financing
Crackerjack	Michael Mazo	Thomas Ian Griffith, Nastassja Kinski, Christopher Plummer	Crime thriller	
Dance Me Outside	Bruce McDonald	Adam Beach, Ryan Black, Hugh Dillon	Drama	Based on a book by W.P. Kinsella; Genie Awards – Editing, Sound Editing
The Darling Family	Alan Zweig	Alan Williams, Linda Griffiths	Drama	
Desire in Motion (Mouvements du désir)	Léa Pool	Valérie Kaprisky, Jean-François Pichette	Drama	Canada-Switzerland co-production
Double Happiness	Mina Shum	Sandra Oh, Callum Keith Rennie		Genie for Best Actress (Oh)
Eclipse	Jeremy Podeswa	John Gilbert, Von Flores, Maria del Mar	Drama	
Ernest Goes to School	Coke Sams	Jim Varney, Linda Kash	Comedy	Direct to DVD
Exotica	Atom Egoyan	Don McKellar, Arsinée Khanjian, Mia Kirshner, Elias Koteas, Sarah Polley	Drama	
Fat Chance	Jeff McKay		Documentary	
For Angela	Daniel Prouty & Nancy Trites Botkin	Tina Keeper	National Film Board docudrama	Canada Award winner
For the Love of Aaron	John Kent Harrison	Meredith Baxter, Nick Mancuso	Drama	
Heads	Paul Shapiro		Comedy	
Henry & Verlin	Gary Ledbetter	Gary Farmer, Robert Joy, Margot Kidder, Eric Peterson	Drama	
A Hero's Life (La Vie d'un héros)	Micheline Lanctôt	Marie Cantin, Gilbert Sicotte, Véronique Le Flaguais	Drama	
Highlander III: The Sorcerer	Andrew Morahan	Christopher Lambert, Mario Van Peebles, Deborah Kara Unger, Mako	Action	Canada-France-U.K. co-production
Highway of Heartache	Gregory Wild	Barbara Chamberlin, Serge Houde	Musical comedy	
It Don't Cost Nothin' to Say Good Morning	Kenny Hotz, Spencer Rice		Documentary	
Jerome's Secret (Le Secret de Jérôme)	Phil Comeau	Denis Lapalme, Germain Houde, Myriam Cyr	Drama	
Kabloonak	Claude Massot	Charles Dance, Bernard Bloch, Natar Ungalaaq	Historical drama	Canada-France co-production
The Last Supper	Cynthia Roberts	Daniel MacIvor, Ken McDougall, J.D. Nicholsen	Drama	Berlin Film Festival Teddy Award winner
Louis 19, King of the Airwaves (Louis 19, le roi des ondes)	Michel Poulette	Martin Drainville, Dominique Michel, Agathe de la Fontaine	Comedy	Claude Jutra Award, Golden Reel Award
Make Some Noise	Andrew Munger	Ghetto Concept, Thrust, Dan-e-o, Da Grassroots, Farley Flex	Short documentary	
Max	Charles Wilkinson	R. H. Thomson, Denise Crosby, Colleen Rennison	Drama	
Mesmer	Roger Spottiswoode	Alan Rickman, Amanda Ooms, Gillian Barge, David Hemblen, Jan Rubeš	Historical costume drama	Canada-German-Austria-U.K. co-production
Million Dollar Babies	Christian Duguay		Drama	
Motherland: Tales of Wonder	Helene Klodawsky		Documentary	
Moving the Mountain	Michael Apted		Documentary	
My Friend Max (Mon amie Max)	Michel Brault	Geneviève Bujold, Marthe Keller, Johanne McKay, Marie Guillard, Michel Rivard	Drama	
Narmada: A Valley Rises	Ali Kazimi		Documentary	
Octobre	Pierre Falardeau	Hugo Dubé, Luc Picard, Serge Houde, Julie Castonguay	Political drama	
Paint Cans	Paul Donovan	Chas Lawther, Robyn Stevan, Bruce Greenwood, Andy Jones, Paul Gross, Neve Campbell	Drama	Screenplay by Paul Donovan based on his own novel
The Paperboy	Douglas Jackson	Alexandra Paul, Marc Marut, William Katt	Horror	
The Passion of John Ruskin	Alex Chapple	Mark McKinney, Neve Campbell	Short drama	
Relative Fear	George Mihalka		Thriller	
Replikator	G. Philip Jackson		Science fiction	
Ride Me	Bashar Shbib	Clark Gregg	Drama	Made with U.S. financing
Road to Saddle River	Francis Damberger	Paul Jarrett, Paul Coeur, Sam Bob, Eric Allan Kramer, Michael Hogan	Comedy	
Romeo and Juliet in Sarajevo	John Zaritsky		Documentary	
Rural Route 5 (Rang 5)	Richard Lavoie		Documentary	
The Santa Clause	John Pasquin	Tim Allen, Judge Reinhold, Wendy Crewson, David Krumholtz, Peter Boyle	Comedy	
Savage Land	Dean Hamilton	Corbin Bernsen, Vivian Schilling, Brion James, Charlotte Ross, Corey Carrier, Mercedes McNab, Graham Greene	Western drama	
Scanner Cop	Pierre David		Horror	
Silent Witness	Harriet Wichin		Documentary	
Sissy Boy Slap Party	Guy Maddin		Experimental short	Lost film; recreated by Maddin in 2004 with new cast.
Sleeping with Strangers	William T. Bolson		Romantic comedy	
Super 8½	Bruce LaBruce			
Trial at Fortitude Bay	Vic Sarin	Henry Czerny, Raoul Trujillo, Lolita Davidovich	Drama	
Wasaga	Judith Doyle	Louise Lilliefeldt, Tracy Wright, Daniel MacIvor	Drama	
Whale Music	Richard J. Lewis	Maury Chaykin, Cyndy Preston, Jennifer Dale, Paul Gross, Kenneth Welsh	Comedy-drama	Based on the novel by Paul Quarrington; Genie Award - Actor (Chaykin)
The Wind from Wyoming (Le Vent du Wyoming)	André Forcier	François Cluzet, Michel Côté, Marc Messier, Martin Randez, Céline Bonnier	Comedy-drama	
Windigo	Robert Morin	Donald Morin, Guy Nadon, Serge Houde	Drama	
Without Rockets	Gary Yates	Ted Felbel	Short comedy-drama	
Yes Sir! Madame...	Robert Morin	Robert Morin	Satirical comedy-drama	
You Love Me I Hate You	Rosamund Owen	Azura Bates, Dov Tiefenbach, Christian Matheson, Lesleh Donaldson	Short drama	

== See also ==
- 1994 in Canada
- 1994 in Canadian television
