= Crackerjack =

Cracker Jack is a snack consisting of caramel-coated popcorn and peanuts.

Cracker Jack or Crackerjack may also refer to:

== Arts, entertainment, and media ==
=== Fictional characters ===
- Cracker Jack (Street Fighter), a character exclusive in Street Fighter EX fighting games
- Crackerjack, a superhero in the comic book Astro City

=== Films ===
- Crackerjack (1938 film), a British comedy crime film directed by Albert de Courville
- Crackerjack (1994 film), an adventure film starring Thomas Ian Griffith, Nastassja Kinski, Christopher Plummer
- Crackerjack 2, a 1997 action film starring Judge Reinhold
- Crackerjack 3, a 2000 spy film starring Bo Svenson
- Crackerjack (2002 film), an Australian comedy

=== Music ===
- The Crackerjacks (band), a popular 1960s Memphis garage rock group
- Arthur Smith & His Crackerjacks, the band on The Arthur Smith Show

=== Periodicals ===
- Crackjack, a magazine supplement with the Bristol Evening Post

=== Television ===
- Crackerjack Productions, an Australian independent television production company
- Crackerjack! (TV series), a British children's comedy television series, running from 1955 to 1984; revived in 2020

== Other uses ==
- Cracker Jack, Pennsylvania, United States, an unincorporated community
- Crackerjack, roller derby competitor, founder of the Mad Rollin' Dolls
- Crackerjack, a nutcracker that uses a ratchet to crack the shell
- Crackerjacks, a nickname for the United States Navy enlisted dress uniforms
