= Battletruck =

- Theatrical release poster
- Directed by: Harley Cokliss
- Written by: Michael Abrams; Irving Austin; John Beech; Harley Cokliss
- Produced by: Lloyd Phillips; Rob Whitehouse
- Starring: Michael Beck; Annie McEnroe; James Wainwright
- Cinematography: Chris Menges
- Edited by: Michael Horton
- Music by: Kevin Peek
- Production company: Battletruck Films
- Distributed by: Kerridge Odeon (New Zealand); Independent Visual Entertainment (United Kingdom)
- Release date: May 14, 1982
- Running time: 91 minutes
- Countries: New Zealand; United Kingdom
- Language: English
- Box office: $1.3 million

Battletruck (also known as Warlords of the 21st Century in the U.S. and Destructors in Italy) is a 1982 New Zealand post-apocalyptic science fiction action film co-written and directed by Harley Cokliss and starring Michael Beck, Annie McEnroe, James Wainwright, John Ratzenberger, and Bruno Lawrence.

Set in the aftermath of a devastating series of wars referred to as the Oil Wars, the plot is a futuristic tale of a community fighting against a local warlord in the lawless rural countryside. A co-production between New Zealand and the United Kingdom, it was filmed on location in New Zealand and starring a number of local actors, and was part of a wave of similarly-themed films made in the wake of the success of the Mad Max series.

== Plot ==
In the near future, Earth has been devastated by a series of wars referred to as "the Oil Wars" over depleting petroleum reserves. The regions around the oil producing Mesopotamia Basin are largely radioactive wastelands due to limited nuclear exchange; oil fields in Saudi Arabia and most of the Middle East burn out of control. Food riots have become common in many cities around the world which are now under martial law. Much of the American rural countryside has become lawless with the majority of remaining military and police trying to maintain order in the cities. Large groups of citizens are fleeing to the countryside to find food and any remaining fuel reserves. What little petroleum remains has become a precious commodity fought over by vicious warlords and mercenaries.

A war party led by former U.S. Army Colonel Jacob Straker (James Wainwright), travelling in a large, heavily armed, armoured truck, intercept two traders riding in a horse-drawn carriage with large amount of diesel fuel, killing one of the traders. The surviving trader takes the war party to the source, which is a hidden supply depot lost during the local government's collapse and thought to be radioactive. Straker orders his men to set up camp to use the supply depot as a base of operations.

Straker's daughter Coraline "Corlie" (Annie McEnroe) refuses to execute the surviving trader. While Straker plans the camp's defence at night, she runs away and flees through the open desert. Corlie is saved from a squad of men sent to return her to the camp by Hunter (Michael Beck), an ex-soldier armed with a high-tech motorbike. Corlie lies about her past and claims she was a hostage taken after her family died. Needing further medical attention for a leg injury, Hunter takes Corlie to live in the walled city of Clearwater Farm, governed as a strict old-fashioned democracy, where she is quickly accepted by the community. However, she is soon discovered by her father's men who take over the Clearwater community to feed Straker's war party. Corlie steals a horse and manages to escape back to Hunter's remote farm in the woods.

The mercenaries terrorize and pillage the community. Straker tortures the resident mechanic Rusty (John Ratzenberger) into giving him the location of Hunter's secret hideout. Straker moves to attack Hunter's farm and recapture Corlie. Hunter and Corlie escape on his motorbike and Straker, in a rage, ploughs through Hunter's residence with his armoured truck. Hunter takes Corlie back to the Clearwater people and asks Rusty to build him an armoured car to attack Straker's "battletruck". While Rusty and Hunter and a few others are thus occupied, one of the residents turns traitor and knocks out Corlie, puts her in a horse-drawn wagon, and heads out to deliver her back to Straker. Hunter tries to stop him, but the traitor sets an ambush for him and wounds him with a crossbow. Believing that he has killed Hunter, the traitor appears at Straker's headquarters with Corlie in the wagon.

Meanwhile, Hunter regains consciousness and manages to limp back to Clearwater on his bike. While getting patched up there, Rusty finishes the armoured car and shortly Hunter takes off in it, despite the fact that he is wounded. He attacks Straker's headquarters, ploughing through buildings and tents and eventually dropping a grenade into Straker's 50,000 litre diesel fuel supply, destroying the fuel. He then runs and Straker, now in a towering rage, takes off after him. In the process, he forces the driver to drive the truck at a higher speed, overheating the turbines. This stresses out the driver (who loves the truck) and leads to dissension between him and Straker.

Hunter, meanwhile, gets some distance ahead, jumps out of the car and climbs to a high place overlooking the road and it is now revealed that the whole attack on Straker's headquarters was a ruse to lure the truck into an ambush. The Clearwater people are at a overlooking ridge waiting for Hunter with his motorcycle and a 66mm rocket launcher which Hunter had given them earlier in the film. Hunter fires a couple of armour-piercing rockets at the moving truck, but only one round hits which causes slight damage and a small fire, which causes more stress between Straker and the truck driver. The driver attempts to kill Straker, who he feels is uselessly destroying the truck. Straker kills the driver who slumps over the wheel and now the truck, throttle set to full, is more or less out of control.

Back on the motorbike, Hunter manages to jump onto the moving truck through a hole in the top that one of his rockets had made. A battle ensues, the truck still careening wildly while Corlie tries to control it with the dead body of the driver slumped over the wheel and Straker furiously shouting commands to everyone. Eventually, Hunter fights his way to the front, temporarily stuns Straker, grabs Corlie, and jumps with her from the back of the still-wildly out of control battletruck with Straker still in it and still screaming, making death threats, and bumbling about the smoking ruins of the interior of the truck before it falls off a cliff, crashes and explodes, killing him and the battletruck sinks to the bottom of the lake.

Hunter and Corlie end up back at Clearwater, where Corlie apparently settles for good as part of the community. Ever the loner, Hunter rides off into the sunset on a horse, promising Corlie that he will be back "sometime".

== Cast ==
- Michael Beck as Hunter
- Annie McEnroe as Coraline "Corlie"
- James Wainwright as Colonel Jacob Straker
- Bruno Lawrence as Willie
- John Ratzenberger as Russell "Rusty"
- John Bach as "Bone"
- Randy Powell as Judd
- Diana Rowan as Charlene
- Kelly Johnson as Alvin
- Mark Hadlow as Orrin
- Marshall Napier as Poole

== Production ==
Harley Cokeliss directed Battletruck after Thongor in the Valley of Demons and adaptation of the Thongor novels he'd been slated to direct was cancelled. Cokeliss had written a four page treatment for Battletruck in the mid 70s during the energy crisis. Cokeliss took the project to Roger Corman who responded positively to the script and gave Cokeliss complete creative control.

Battletruck was filmed on the Central Otago plains in New Zealand. Despite being produced by a Hollywood studio and being considered a Hollywood release, the film largely used a New Zealand crew and New Zealand actors. It followed the success of films such as Mad Max and was made in New Zealand in part due to the 1981 Writers Guild of America strike.

Lee Tamahori, director of Once Were Warriors was the boom operator on the film.

== Soundtrack ==
Battletruck

Soundtrack album by Kevin Peek and Eastern Orbit
- Released: 1982
- Recorded: 1983
- Genres: Progressive rock, film score

The music for the film was composed and conducted by Kevin Peek and performed by Eastern Orbit and the New Zealand Symphony Orchestra.

=== Track listing ===
1. "Battletruck" (4:14)
2. "Black Devil" (4:14)
3. "Peaceful Village" (1:35)
4. "Wandering Wolf" (3:34)
5. "Blazing Waste" (3:17)
6. "Corlie, My Love" (1:10)
7. "Boundless Field" (2:20)
8. "Rider in Gale" (3:40)
9. "Corlie is at Crisis" (1:40)
10. "Hunter's Counterattack" (2:13)
11. "Never Forget" (1:28)
12. "Persuit" (sic) (2:09)
13. "Battletruck in Flames" (5:20)
14. "Battletruck" (reprise) (4:14)

== Sequel ==
Prior to release there had been discussions with producers for a sequel tentatively titled Battletruck II, but nothing ultimately ever came of it.

== See also ==
Other films set in a post-apocalytic future, specially on wasteland scenario:

- Damnation Alley (1977), directed by Jack Smight
- Mad Max (1979) and Mad Max 2: The Road Warrior (1981), both directed by George Miller
- Exterminators of the Year 3000 (1983), directed by Giuliano Carnimeo
- The New Barbarians (1983), directed by Enzo G. Castellari
- Stryker (1983) and Wheels of Fire (1985), both directed by Cirio H. Santiago
- Solarbabies (1986), directed by Alan Johnson
- Steel Dawn (1987), directed by Lance Hool
- Cyborg (1989), directed by Albert Pyun
- Desert Warrior (1988), directed by Jim Goldman
- Empire of Ash (1988) and Empire of Ash III (1989), directed by Michael Mazo
