= Crackerjack 3 =

2000 film by Lloyd A. Simandl

- Original key art
- Directed by: Lloyd A. Simandl
- Screenplay by: Chris Hyde
- Produced by: Lloyd A. Simandl
- Starring: Bo Svenson; Olivier Gruner; Leo Rossi; Amy Weber
- Cinematography: Vladimir Kolar
- Edited by: Derek Whelan
- Music by: Peter Allen
- Production company: North American Pictures
- Distributed by: Monarch Home Entertainment (U.S.); Lions Gate Films (Canada)
- Release dates: December 12, 2000 (U.S.); April 24, 2001 (Canada)
- Running time: 97 minutes
- Countries: Czech Republic; Canada
- Language: English

Crackerjack 3 is a 2000 Czech-Canadian spy action film directed by Lloyd A. Simandl and starring Bo Svensson, Olivier Gruner, Leo Rossi and Amy Weber. It concerns a group of former Cold War rivals who must work together to thwart a terror attack at an international congress. It a sequel in name only to 1994's Crackerjack and 1997's Crackerjack 2: Hostage Train, and was initially marketed as a separate project.

== Plot ==
Veteran CIA agent Jack Thorn is ousted from his post by a corrupt replacement, Marcus Clay, who is orchestrating an international incident in order to short sell the markets. This includes a neutron bomb plot to coincide with a United Nations economic summit in Germany. Forming an unlikely alliance with former adversaries from the espionage world, Thorn springs into action, commandeers a jet, and then go undercover to try and prevent the terror attack.

== Cast ==
- Bo Svenson as Jack Thorn
- Olivier Gruner as Marcus Clay
- Leo Rossi as Ricky Santeria-Ramos
- Amy Weber as Kelly Jones
- Milan Gargula as Benny Goldman
- Robert Russell as Yuri Katchkov
- Jan Nemejovský as Kurt von Brunner
- Gregory Linington as Griswald
- Noel le Bon as Kelp
- Max Norlin as Dieter
- Borivoj Navrátil as Pierre Lapin
- Phillip Lee Seger as Pvt. Berman

== Production ==
At the 1998 Cannes Film Market, North American Pictures' sales arm pitched the movie as a standalone effort called Code of Dishonor. According to one source, William Forsythe was supposed to star. As with all of North American's later productions, the majority of the shoot took place at the company's own studios in Milín, Czech Republic. Some location work did take place at nearby Dobříš Castle, which serves as the site of the film's fictional economic forum. In January 2000, American media reported that actress Amy Weber had recently returned home from filming what was now known as Crackerjack 3.

== Release ==
In the U.S., Crackerjack 3 was released on VHS and DVD on December 12, 2000, by Monarch Home Entertainment. In Canada, the film debuted on video on April 24, 2001, through Lions Gate Films.

== Reception ==
Discussing an advance screening of Crackerjack 3 in the post Cannes 2000 issue of French magazine Impact, Damien Granger found that it was "unfortunately undone by its amusing concept", as its senior protagonists appeared "better suited to delivering cane strikes than brandishing the de rigueur heavy machine guns", resulting in a "meager" action quotient. Writing for the Staten Island Advance and the Newhouse News Service, Rich Ryan did not find the inter-generational rivalry well realized and assessed: "Unfortunately the plot is weak, and the scenes with supporting characters take as much time as those with the leads." Jay Bobbin of the Tribune Media Services rated it a two on a scale of one to four, although the plot summary suggests that the film was not properly reviewed, as it presents Gruner's character as the hero, returning from previous entries, neither of which is accurate. The film was also reviewed by TV Guide, but the online version of the article has been lost.

Reception by the enthusiast media was just as poor. Eoin Friel of The Action Elite lambasted an "appalling film" consisting of "a bunch of old men talking" for much of its runtime, and further plagued by "unfunny humour and terrible music." Chris "The Brain" of Bulletproof Action concurred, writing: "As a pure action movie I would give Crackerjack 3 a thumbs down". He added that "it felt like a 2-hour pilot for an action comedy TV show that didn't get picked up, so they dusted it off and slapped the Crackerjack name on it."
