= Mark Greenstreet =

British actor (born 1960)

- Born: 19 April 1960 (age 65)
- Occupations: Actor; Writer; Director
- Relatives: Sydney Greenstreet (great uncle)

Mark Greenstreet (born 19 April 1960) is a British actor, writer and director.

== Career ==
First and foremost a stage actor, Greenstreet played leading roles from the works of Shakespeare, Chekhov, and Ibsen to Orton, Wilde, and Coward in the UK and around the world in the 1980s and 1990s.

Greenstreet appeared in the 1985 BBC television adaptation of Brat Farrar. In 1986, he auditioned for the part of James Bond in The Living Daylights. In the science-fiction series Doctor Who, Greenstreet played Ikona in the 1987 serial Time and the Rani. In 1988, he appeared in Harley Cokeliss’ 1988 film Dream Demon. His most high-profile screen role is probably the part of Mike Hardy in the BBC horseracing drama Trainer, which was shown from 1991 to 1992.

He directed and co-wrote his first feature film Caught in the Act in 1995, wrote and directed a short film The 13th Protocol in 2005, and wrote and directed the psychological thriller Silent Hours starring James Weber Brown, Dervla Kirwan, Indira Varma, and Hugh Bonneville through UK production company Gallery Pictures in 2018. Prior to its release, however, with the burgeoning worldwide audience demand for high-quality TV drama and on-demand box sets, the film's producers were approached to recut and release Silent Hours not as a film, but as a TV miniseries. Set in the naval city of Portsmouth in the run-up to Easter 2002, the three 1-hour miniseries Silent Hours (Ep1: "The Silent Service", Ep2: "The Midnight Tide", Ep3: "Towards The Sea") was readied for worldwide release through French international distributor Fizz-e-Motion.

== Personal life ==
Mark is the great-nephew of Hollywood actor Sydney Greenstreet.
