= Black Moon Rising =

1986 film by Harley Cokeliss

- Theatrical release poster by Steven Chorney
- Directed by: Harley Cokliss
- Screenplay by: John Carpenter; William Gray; Desmond Nakano
- Story by: John Carpenter
- Produced by: Douglas Curtis; Joel B. Michaels
- Starring: Tommy Lee Jones; Linda Hamilton; Robert Vaughn; Richard Jaeckel; Bubba Smith
- Cinematography: Misha Suslov
- Edited by: Todd C. Ramsay
- Music by: Lalo Schifrin
- Production company: New World Pictures; Sequoia Productions
- Distributed by: New World Pictures
- Release date: January 10, 1986
- Running time: 100 minutes
- Country: United States
- Language: English
- Budget: $3 million
- Box office: $6.5 million

Black Moon Rising is a 1986 American science fiction action-thriller film directed by Harley Cokeliss, from a screenplay co-written by John Carpenter. It stars Tommy Lee Jones, Linda Hamilton, Robert Vaughn, Keenan Wynn, Richard Jaeckel, and Bubba Smith. The plot revolves around the theft of a prototype vehicle called the Black Moon. The film was released by New World Pictures on January 10, 1986.

== Plot ==
Sam Quint is a former thief hired by the FBI to steal a computer disk which contains incriminating evidence against The Lucky Dollar Corporation of Las Vegas. After stealing the disk, Quint is pursued by Marvin Ringer, a former thief and acquaintance who works for the company. At the same time, a prototype vehicle called the Black Moon, which can reach speeds of 325 miles per hour (523 km/h) and runs on tap water, is being tested in the desert by Earl Windom. Quint and Windom later cross paths at a gas station, where Quint hides the disk in the back bumper of the Black Moon. Windom is hauling the Black Moon to L.A., and Quint, still being pursued by Ringer and his men, follows Windom and his team there.

In L.A., Quint meets with FBI agent Johnson and demands double pay and a clean passport so he can retire since he is now dealing with Ringer. Quint tails Windom and the Black Moon to a restaurant, where Windom is negotiating a deal to sell the prototype to a car manufacturer. Before Quint can get to the disk, a group of auto thieves, led by Nina, steals all of the cars in the parking lot, including the Black Moon off of its trailer. Quint tracks the cars to an office tower. Inside the garage, Quint is seen on the security cameras. Back at the restaurant, Quint is warned by Johnson that he will not get paid unless the disk is returned within three days. Quint then goes to Windom and his team and asks for their help in getting the car back, but they refuse, unsure if they can trust him.

Quint gets the blueprints for the office towers from city hall. The Ryland Towers are a pair of office buildings built by Ed Ryland, who is also the head of the stolen car syndicate. The basement of the towers is a large "chop shop," and Ryland keeps the best cars for himself and sells the rest. He scolds Nina for stealing the Black Moon, a car he cannot possibly resell. After seeing Nina leave the towers, Quint follows her to a nightclub. At the club, they meet and go to her apartment. They have sex, then he asks her to help him get the car back. Later, Windom and his team go to the towers to look for evidence to give to the police. Ryland's goons kill one of the team members, so they go back to Quint and offer their assistance. Meanwhile, Ringer has tracked down Quint and demands the return of the disk. Quint is severely beaten, but escapes.

Nina is summoned by Ryland, who confronts her with the tape of Quint outside of the garage, and a tape of them having sex. Deeming her a traitor, he locks her in the closet. Meanwhile, Quint and Windom determine that since the chop shop entrance is impenetrable from the garage, the best way to get in is through the unfinished second tower. While Windom destroys the security cameras, Quint climbs the empty tower and crosses to the other one. While descending a ventilation shaft, he discovers Nina in the locked closet and frees her. She agrees to help Quint steal the Black Moon. Quint and Nina enter the chop shop and take the Black Moon.

Quint drives the Black Moon into the freight elevator, which takes them to Ryland's office. During the chase on that floor, Nina activates the turbo boost that makes the car reach its top speed. The car then shoots towards a window, hitting and killing Ryland instantly. The car then goes through the window and flies into the unoccupied building. Thinking they are safe, Quint gets the disk out from the bumper, but Ringer shows up to retrieve it. He and Quint start fighting just as Johnson shows up. After a brutal fistfight, Quint knocks out Ringer and takes back the disk and gives it to Johnson. The movie ends back at Nina's apartment, where Quint asks her if she is happy she stole the Black Moon. After she says yes, he says that he is, too.

== Cast ==
- Tommy Lee Jones as Sam Quint
- Linda Hamilton as Nina
- Robert Vaughn as Ed Ryland
- Richard Jaeckel as Earl Windom
- Bubba Smith as FBI Agent Johnson
- Dan Shor as Billy Lyons
- Keenan Wynn as John "Iron John"
- Lee Ving as Marvin Ringer
- William Sanderson as Tyke Thayden
- Nick Cassavetes as Luis
- Don Keith Opper as Emile French
- Townsend Coleman as the Waiter

== Production ==
John Carpenter wrote the script around the time he made Escape from New York. "It was my 'my car is stolen and I'm going to get it back' story," he said. "I have never seen the final film." Producers Joel B. Michaels and Douglas Curtis had previously produced another Carpenter-penned script, The Philadelphia Experiment, which proved to be successful for New World Pictures and led to their decision to produce Carpenter's Black Moon Rising. Harley Cokeliss was one of the many writers who contributed to The Philadelphia Experiment having been hired by Michaels after reading a positive review for Battletruck in Variety. Cokeliss had initially been slated to direct The Philadelphia Experiment, but lost out on the opportunity when New World's new financial partner didn't put him on the short list. When Curtis asked Cokeliss if he knew of any projects that could be made in the range of $3 million, Cokeliss suggested Black Moon Rising and received Carpenter's blessing during a chance encounter at the Formosa Cafe in West Hollywood, California. According to Cokeliss, the original screenplay as written would've cost an estimate $10–15 million which necessitating several re-writes to get the film to fit within the $3 million budget. The film was shot as a non-union production at night around Los Angeles, California with underpasses, a gay leather bar, and an abandoned Firestone factory utilized as filming locations.

=== Car ===
The Black Moon was based on the 1980 Wingho Concordia II designed by Bernard Beaujardins and Clyde Kwok, made by Wingho Auto Classique in Montreal. Only one of these had been built, so in the movie, a copy of the car cast from a mold was used for stunts, as well as a third replica of the interior only.

At the conclusion of the film, dialog between the engineers recovering the vehicle include the phrase "...return to Italy", implying (though without explicitly stating) that the car is meant to be a version of the Ferrari Modulo concept car, with which a similar general design form is shared.

== Reception ==
In The New York Times, Vincent Canby wrote that the film "sounds pretty silly, and it is, but it's not painful to watch [...] Giving the film its class is Mr. Jones, an actor who has been on the brink of real star status for too many years." Writing for the Los Angeles Times, Michael Wilmington praised "the clean thrust of the plot, the furiously lucid action and the canny, almost stylized, minimalist performances of the actors (Jones, Hamilton, [et al.])".

Review aggregator Rotten Tomatoes gives the film a rating of 40%, based on 15 reviews.

== Release ==
The film was released in US theatres on January 10, 1986.

=== Home media ===
The film was released on DVD on January 30, 2001 initially, then on December 7, 2007, and finally on November 1, 2011, by Anchor Bay Entertainment. It was released on Blu-ray from Kino Lorber on May 14, 2019.
