= Sleeping Dogs (1997 film) =

- Directed by: Micheal Bafaro
- Written by: Chris Hyde
- Produced by: Suzanne Daley; Michelle Gahagan; Lloyd A. Simandl; Deborah Thompson
- Starring: Scott McNeil; C. Thomas Howell; Kiara Hunter; Heather Hanson
- Cinematography: David Pelletier
- Edited by: Richard Benwick; Derek A Whelan
- Music by: Peter Allen
- Distributed by: North American Pictures
- Release date: October 12, 1997
- Running time: 96 minutes
- Countries: Canada; Czech Republic; Germany; United States
- Language: English

Sleeping Dogs (also known as Deviants and Mission: LA 2029) is a 1997 Canadian sci-fi action film directed by Micheal Bafaro.

== Plot ==
A jewel thief in 2020s Los Angeles (Scott McNeil) tries to save a spaceship crew from the emerald smuggling criminals who are holding them captive.

== Cast ==
- Scott McNeil as Harry Maxwell
- C. Thomas Howell as Sanchez Boon
- Heather Hanson as Pandora Grimes
- Kiara Hunter as Zee 4R
- Richard Toth as Wallace
- Angela Madden as Stocker
- Stephen Fisher as Morton
- Sean Fuller as Sweeney
- Paul Jarrett as Willy Boy Pruitt
- Gregory Linington as Brock
- Christopher Clarke as Grogan
- Julius Krajewski as Samson
- Seth Markel as Crenshaw
- Michael Rogers as Haverty
- Darren Dalton as Dexter
- Jaroslav Peterka as Raoul
- Pavel Kříž as Alexandrov
- Dave Ulrich as Cole
- Shannon McCormick as Tippit
- Karel Vávrovec as Carlos
- Miroslav Lhotka as Hugo

== Background ==
It was a Czech Republic co-production, with filming taking place in Czech studios. It is the only film to feature Australian-Canadian actor Scott McNeil in a leading role. McNeil is known for his extensive voice acting career, and at the time was voicing Piccolo in the Saban dub of Dragon Ball Z.

== Release and reception ==
It was released direct-to-video in North America, Europe and Australia.

Robert Firsching of AllMovie gave the film two stars, writing "Set in the year 2029 for no apparent reason, this Canadian-Czech co-production literally consists of almost nothing but a steady barrage of gunfire and explosions. Reducing its genre (sci-fi/action) to nothing but the so-called 'good parts,' Sleeping Dogs (1997) emerges as a movie that looks like it was filmed in shorthand. It's a paint-by-numbers effort with very little to either praise or criticize; it's just there, although that's no reason for anyone to feel compelled to watch it." He also claimed that, "As the ludicrously named Sanchez Boon, C. Thomas Howell prances around and prissily quotes literature like a bearded Riddler from a particularly bad episode of the old Batman TV series. Howell's ridiculous performance is the sole reason that even those viewers who cherish bad movies would want to watch this."

TV Guide gave Sleeping Dogs a mixed negative review, labelling it as having "looney-tune characters, stale dialogue and the unmistakable whiff of cheesy camp." They claimed that, "nothing about this futuristic sci-fi adventure is exceptional or unexpected, except the extensive exposition involving gems replacing cash as currency."
