= Mean Dog Blues =

1978 American drama film

- Directed by: Mel Stuart
- Written by: George Lefferts
- Produced by: George Lefferts; Charles A. Pratt
- Starring: Gregg Henry; Kay Lenz; Scatman Crothers; Tina Louise; George Kennedy
- Cinematography: Robert B. Hauser
- Edited by: Houseley Stevenson Jr.
- Music by: Fred Karlin
- Production company: Bing Crosby Productions
- Distributed by: American International Pictures
- Release date: March 1978
- Running time: 108 minutes
- Country: United States
- Language: English

Mean Dog Blues is a 1978 American drama film directed by Mel Stuart. It stars Gregg Henry and Kay Lenz.

== Plot ==
After hitchhiking a car ride with a drunken politician and his seductive wife, Paul Ramsey, a singer, offers to take the rap in court when the politician seriously injures a child while under the influence, only to be double-crossed and sentenced to five years in prison. He ends up with other inmates treated sadistically by a brutal prison official who makes them train his hunting dogs including Rattler, a vicious Doberman.

== Cast ==
- Gregg Henry as Paul Ramsey
- Kay Lenz as Linda Ramsey
- George Kennedy as Captain Omar Kinsman
- Scatman Crothers as Mudcat
- Tina Louise as Donna Lacey
- Felton Perry as Jake Turner
- Gregory Sierra as Jesus Gonzales
- James Wainwright as Sergeant Wacker
- William Windom as Victor Lacey
