= Dream Demon =

- Promotional poster
- Directed by: Harley Cokeliss
- Written by: Christopher Wicking; Harley Cokeliss; Catherine de Pury
- Produced by: Paul Webster
- Starring: Jemma Redgrave; Kathleen Wilhoite; Jimmy Nail; Timothy Spall; Mark Greenstreet; Susan Fleetwood
- Cinematography: Ian Wilson
- Edited by: Ian Crafford; David Martin
- Music by: Bill Nelson
- Production companies: Palace Pictures; British Screen Productions; International Spectrafilm; Filmscreen Productions Ltd.
- Distributed by: Palace Pictures
- Release date: 14 October 1988
- Running time: 86 minutes
- Country: United Kingdom
- Language: English
- Budget: £2 million

Dream Demon is a 1988 British horror film co-written and directed by Harley Cokeliss and starring Jemma Redgrave in her debut role opposite Kathleen Wilhoite, Jimmy Nail, Susan Fleetwood and Timothy Spall.

== Plot ==
Diana Markham, an upper class schoolteacher in London, is preparing to marry her fiancé, the wealthy Oliver. Diana is plagued by nightmares which cast Oliver in violent roles, including ones in which he rapes her. Upon moving into her new home, she also has fiery visions of a young blonde girl adorned with angel wings. Diana is particularly frightened of the home's basement. Her therapist, Deborah, assures her the dreams are a result of stress regarding the pending wedding, especially the harassment Diana receives from the press attempting to cover the wedding.

While being assailed outside her home by photographer Peck and investigative journalist Paul, Diana is helped by Jenny, a tourist from Los Angeles who fights them off. Diana invites Jenny in for a drink, and Jenny soon confesses that she is visiting in hopes of unearthing her family origins: She was adopted as a young child but has no memory of her biological parents, who once lived at Diana's address. Diana takes a liking to Jenny, and the women agree to meet the following day. Later that night, Diana has a hallucinogenic nightmare in which Peck breaks into her home and attacks her.

In the morning, Jenny arrives and Diana explains her nightmare. Shortly after, the women find Paul in the basement of the home. He threatens Diana, and says that Peck has gone missing. After the incident, Jenny agrees to stay with Diana to comfort her. Diana confides her anxieties about her marriage, and admits to Jenny that she is a virgin. Some time later, Jenny experiences a hallucination in which she is attacked by a deformed Peck, and witnesses a young blonde girl being verbally abused by her father. She flees and manages to awaken Diana, who has fallen asleep on the couch, after which the apparent supernatural occurrences cease. The next morning, the women meet with Deborah, who proposes the idea that Jenny astral projected. The women realize that Diana's dreams have the power to impact waking life.

Upon returning to the home, both women are plagued by shared visions and frightening hallucinations anchored to the basement. Terrified, Jenny returns to her hotel, insisting that the home is haunted, and books a return flight to California. Diana falls asleep in Jenny's hotel room. Meanwhile, Paul arrives at the hotel, having been following the women, and confronts Jenny with information he has uncovered about Oliver: He is in financial ruin and is marrying Diana for economic security. Realizing that Diana is again dreaming, Jenny attempts to wake her, but Diana slips into another nightmare in which she is tormented by deformed versions of Paul and Peck.

Diana awakens in Jenny's hotel room, but is skeptical of whether she is experiencing a waking reality or another dream. The women become separated, and Diana experiences further disturbing visions of the young blonde girl, as well as Peck and Paul. Diana awakens again in her disheveled bedroom and is confronted by Oliver and Deborah, who drug her to fall back asleep. Later, Diana is hospitalized and affixed with a brainwave monitor. While astral projecting, Diana looks on as Deborah watches old footage of the young blonde girl in a hospital therapy session—the girl is in fact Jenny during her childhood, shortly before she was sent to live in the United States. In the astral plane, Diana returns to her home and saves Jenny, who has been trapped in a void. The two again become separated, and Jenny relives her repressed childhood trauma: Her widowed father, a violent and abusive artist, tied her to a sculpture in his basement art studio to use as a model. While sharpening a sculpting tool, he ignited a fire with a can of turpentine in which he was burned alive. An adult Jenny, bound to the sculpture, is saved by Diana. The women embrace before fleeing the home together.

Later, Diana and Jenny visit Jenny's father's gravestone, which features a stone cast of her with angel wings. Back in the empty home, which Diana has now put up for sale, an alive Peck and Paul suddenly return.

== Cast ==
- Jemma Redgrave as Diana Markham
- Kathleen Wilhoite as Jenny Hoffman
- Annabelle Lanyon as Young Diana Markham / Young Jenny Hoffman
- Timothy Spall as Peck
- Jimmy Nail as Paul
- Mark Greenstreet as Oliver
- Susan Fleetwood as Deborah
- Nickolas Grace as Jenny's Father

== Production ==
Cokeliss was inspired by Billy Wilder and surrealist films when designing the film's dream sequences. The film was shot on a budget of £2 million.

== Release ==
The film was released theatrically in England on 14 October 1988.

=== Critical response ===
The Guardian criticized the film for failing to "follow its own logic," but conceded that the film is "often smartly made, and the special effects are excellent. The pity is that it could have been so much better had it stuck to what it is really about, which is people haunting themselves." The Sydney Morning Herald wrote: "The special effects won't rock your socks but the build-up of suspense and some sudden shocks are guaranteed to hold attention."
