= Listen (1996 film) =

- Directed by: Gavin Wilding
- Written by: Micheal Bafaro; Jonas Quastel
- Produced by: Diane Patrick O'Connor
- Starring: Brooke Langton; Sarah G. Buxton; Gordon Currie; Andy Romano; J. H. Wyman
- Cinematography: Brian Pearson
- Edited by: Melinda Friedman
- Music by: David Davidson
- Production company: Devin Entertainment
- Distributed by: Orion Pictures
- Release dates: 17 July 1996 (Philadelphia International Film Festival); 27 September 1996 (US)
- Running time: 101 minutes
- Country: United States
- Language: English

Listen is a 1996 American mystery thriller film directed by Gavin Wilding, starring Brooke Langton, Sarah G. Buxton, Gordon Currie, Andy Romano, J. H. Wyman.

== Cast ==
- Brooke Langton as Sarah Ross
- Sarah G. Buxton as Krista Baron
- Gordon Currie as Jake Taft
- Andy Romano as Detective Sam Steinmann
- J. H. Wyman as Randy Wilkes
- Evan Tylor as Detective Louis Penny
- Jeff Burnett as Curtis Farley
- Philip Granger as Max
- Iris Quinn as Farley's Sister
- Sherry Thoreson as Lisa

== Reception ==
Kevin Thomas of the Los Angeles Times wrote while Buxton and Langton are "poised", and Wilding's direction is "earnest", Quastel and Bafaro's screenplay is "ludicrous and exploitative of violence against women".

Leonard Klady of Variety called the film "stylish" but "extremely empty-headed".

TV Guide called the film "glossy" but "witless".
