= Michael Bafaro =

American film director

Michael Bafaro, at times listed as Micheal Bafaro
- Occupations: Film director; screenwriter

Michael Bafaro, at times listed as Micheal Bafaro, is an American filmmaker. He began his career in the mid-1980s, working in props and special effects before transitioning to the role of Assistant Director. He eventually shifted his focus to writing and directing, becoming an award-winning independent filmmaker. He wrote his first produced screenplay for the 1994 action film Crackerjack and made his directorial debut the following year with the crime thriller For a Few Lousy Dollars. As a screenwriter, Bafaro has worked on various Hollywood projects, including early drafts of a Judge Dredd feature film and an unmade reboot of William Castle's I Saw What You Did.

== Filmography ==
Year	Title	Director	Writer	Notes and References
1994	Crackerjack	No	Yes	As Michael Bafaro
1995	For a Few Lousy Dollars	Yes	No	Also writer (uncredited)
1996	Listen	No	Yes	As Michael Bafaro
1997	Sleeping Dogs	Yes	No	
1998	Act of War	No	Yes	Additional material (as Michael Bafaro)
2002	The Barber	Yes	Yes	
2004	11:11	Yes	Yes	
2006	Canes	Yes	No	
2007	Behind the Wall	No	Yes	As Michael Bafaro
2009	The Devil's Ground	Yes	Yes	
2011	Rise of the Damned	Yes	No	
2012	Embedded	Yes	Yes	Also producer
2016	Wrecker	Yes	Yes	Also producer
2020	Amber's Descent	Yes	Yes	Written and produced as The Michaels
2022	myPhone	Yes	Yes	Written and produced as The Michaels
2022	Ascension	Yes	Yes	Written and produced as The Michaels
2023	Don't Look Away	Yes	Yes	Written and produced as The Michaels
