= James Wainwright (actor) =

American actor (1938–1999)

- Born: March 5, 1938; Danville, Illinois, U.S.
- Died: December 20, 1999 (aged 61)
- Occupation: Actor
- Years active: 1967–1990
- Spouse(s): Janet L. Cook (m. 1967; div. 1978)

James Lee Wainwright (March 5, 1938 – December 20, 1999) was an American actor best known for his roles in films such as Joe Kidd (1972), The President's Plane Is Missing (1973), Killdozer (1974), Bridger (1976, as Jim Bridger), The Private Files of J. Edgar Hoover (1977), Mean Dog Blues (1978), Battletruck (1982) and The Survivors (1983).

His television appearances include Beyond Westworld and Jigsaw.

== Early life and career ==
Born out of wedlock in Danville, Illinois and left in a foundling home in Chicago when he was two days old, Wainwright was raised by a succession of foster parents before being adopted at either five or six years of age by Leo Wainwright and Esther L. Embry. By 1950, the Wainwrights had separated, but James continued to live with his adoptive mother.

The adoptive cousin (once removed) of General Jonathan M. Wainwright, James Wainwright served with distinction in the United States Marines during the Korean War.

== Personal life and death ==
From 1967 until their divorce in 1978, Wainwright was married to Janet L. Cook. They had two children, both daughters. On March 26, 1973, Wainwright and his wife appeared together as themselves, competing against Dave Madden and his wife, on the TV game show It's Your Bet.

Wainwright died on December 20, 1999 at age 61 from lung cancer, survived by his two daughters.

== Filmography ==
Year	Title	Role	Notes
1969	The Virginian	Jack Withers	Episode: "Last Grave at Socorro Creek"
1971	The Virginian	Boyd Dewey	Episode: "The Animal"
1972	Joe Kidd	Olin Mingo	
1973	The President's Plane Is Missing	General Dunbar	
1973	A Woman Called Moses	Andrew Coleman	
1974	Killdozer	Jules 'Dutch' Krasner	
1974	Cannon	Roy	Episode: "Duel in the Desert"
1975	Cannon	Old Coach	Episode: "Search and Destroy"
1976	Bridger	Jim Bridger	
1977	The Private Files of J. Edgar Hoover	Young J. Edgar Hoover	
1977	Hawaii Five-O	Richard Royce	Episode: "Shake Hands with the Man on the Moon"
1977	The Oregon Trail	Hubbard	Episode: "The Man Who Wouldn't Die"
1978	Mean Dog Blues	Sergeant Hubbell Wacker	
1979	M*A*S*H	Lieutenant Colonel Lacy	Episode: "Preventative Medicine"
1979	The Incredible Hulk	Tom Wallace	Episode: "No Escape"
1979	Undercover with the KKK	T.J. Barker	
1979	Vega$	Theo Latimer	Episode: "Shadow on a Star"
1982	Battletruck	Straker	
1982	Magnum, P.I.	Lyden	Episode: "Past Tense"
1983	The Survivors	Wes Huntley	
1986	Stingray	Henry Pollard	Episode: "Below The Line"
1988	Hell Raiders	'Boom-Boom' Callahan	
1990	Mission Manila	Harrison	(final film role)
