= Ripper 2: Letter from Within =

- Directed by: Jonas Quastel; Lloyd A. Simandl
- Written by: John A. Curtis; Pat Bermel
- Produced by: Jonas Quastel
- Starring: Erin Karpluk; Nicolas Irons
- Cinematography: John Drake
- Edited by: David Campling
- Music by: Peter Allen
- Distributed by: Velocity Home Entertainment
- Release date: 3 August 2004
- Running time: 89 minutes
- Country: United Kingdom
- Language: English

Ripper 2 (US title: Ripper 2: Letter from Within) is a 2004 British horror film directed by Jonas Quastel, starring Erin Karpluk and Nicolas Irons, and is a sequel to Ripper. It was written and produced by John A. Curtis and Pat Bermel.

== Plot ==
The director of an asylum offers to the serial killer Molly Keller a chance to be submitted to a pilot unconventional experiment in Prague, in the Weisser Institute. Molly accepts, and she travels to the clinic, where Dr. Samuel Wiesser developed a treatment using a virtual world, and Molly and deranged youngsters would be trial subjects. However, something does not work well in the experiment, and when the patients die in their trip, the same happens in the real world.

== Cast ==
- Erin Karpluk as Molly Keller
- Nicholas Irons as Erich Goethe
- Mhairi Steenbock as Juliette Dureau
- Jane Peachey as Lara Svetlana
- Daniel Coonan as Grant Jessup
- Colin Lawrence as Roberto Edwards
- Myfanwy Waring as Sally Trigg
- Andrea Miltner as Marya
- Curtis Matthew as Psychologist
- Richard Bremmer as Dr. Samuel Wiesser

== Reception ==
Horror site Vegan Voorhees said, "Even with two directors and four scribes, the creative team fail to even muster the most basic of chills."
