= The Survivors (1983 film) =

1983 film by Michael Ritchie

- Theatrical release poster
- Directed by: Michael Ritchie
- Written by: Michael Leeson
- Produced by: William Sackheim
- Starring: Walter Matthau; Robin Williams; Jerry Reed
- Cinematography: Billy Williams
- Edited by: Richard A. Harris
- Music by: Paul Chihara
- Distributed by: Columbia Pictures
- Release date: June 22, 1983 (New York City)
- Running time: 102 minutes
- Country: United States
- Language: English
- Budget: $15 million
- Box office: $14 million

The Survivors is a 1983 American comedy film directed by Michael Ritchie. It stars Walter Matthau and Robin Williams, with supporting roles by Jerry Reed, Kristen Vigard and James Wainwright.

== Plot ==
The story focuses on two beleaguered New Yorkers: Donald Quinelle, a dental supply executive who is fired from his job, and Sonny Paluso, a gas station owner whose station Donald accidentally blows up. The two men inadvertently meet later in a coffee shop, which is robbed by a man in a ski mask. Donald is shot, but Sonny gets a good look at the man. Donald is interviewed by the news, and inadvertently reveals Sonny's identity. That night, the robber (named Jack Locke) visits Sonny's house to kill him and his teenage daughter, Candice, but Donald saves them. Sonny and Donald take Jack to the police at gunpoint.

Donald has become paranoid and convinced of the imminent collapse of society. He buys several guns, leaves his girlfriend Doreen, and goes to a Vermont "survival camp" led by a man named Wes Huntley. Jack is released from jail. Sonny tries to reason with him, and Jack agrees to leave Donald and Sonny alone if they say nothing to the police. Sonny and Candice go up to the camp to tell Donald of the deal. Donald, however, is so confident of his ability to face danger that he taunts Jack into coming up to the camp for a final showdown.

Donald has become a killing machine, due to Wes's teachings. He and Jack do battle, which ends in a draw. With the whole group in the same cabin, the other campers surround it in an attempt to kill Jack. Sonny, Candice, Jack and Donald escape in Sonny's car. The bloodthirsty campers give chase, but give up when Sonny exposes Wes as a rich businessman whose camp is a fraud. The foursome head home. Donald exits the car and has a breakdown, realizing how much he has lost. Sonny tries to comfort him. The two walk back to the car as friends.

== Cast ==
- Walter Matthau as Sonny Paluso
- Robin Williams as Donald Quinelle
- Jerry Reed as Jack Locke
- James Wainwright as Wes Huntley
- Kristen Vigard as Candace Paluso
- Annie McEnroe as Doreen
- Anne Pitoniak as Betty
- Bernard Barrow as TV Station Manager
- Marian Hailey as Mrs. Locke
- Joseph Carberry as Detective Matt Burke
- Skipp Lynch as Wiley
- Marilyn Cooper as Waitress
- Meg Mundy as Mace Lover
- John Goodman as Commando
- Tiffany Clark as Herself
- Marc Stevens as Himself

== Reception ==
The film did not garner many positive reviews, scoring a 9% fresh rating on Rotten Tomatoes, based on 11 reviews. Audiences polled by CinemaScore gave the film an average grade of "C" on an A+ to F scale.

Pauline Kael's review in The New Yorker:

The banner line on the ad says 'Once they declare war on each other, watch out. You could die laughing.' The Survivors isn't about two men declaring war on each other; it's about two New Yorkers without anything in common who become friends. The advertisers probably didn't know what to do with it because it's a comedy for grownups. There's a lot of unconventional humour in the writing by Michael Leeson. Robin Williams' work transcends the film's flaws. He acts with an emotional purity that I can't pretend to understand. A lot of the comedy comes from his being a grownup with this ranting little kid inside him. Walter Matthau gives a quiet, old pro's performance.
