= Peter Allen (composer) =

Canadian composer (born 1952)

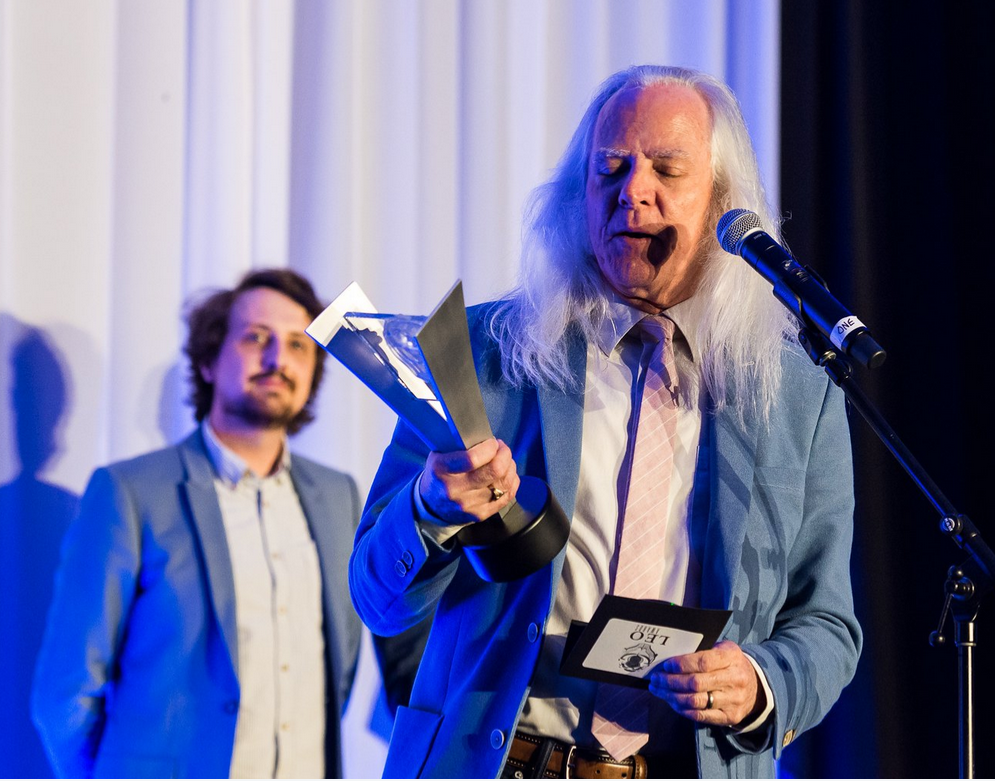
Peter Allen accepting his Leo Award for Truly, Madly, Sweetly in 2019

Peter Allen is a Canadian composer, organist, and keyboard player. An associate of the Canadian Music Centre and a member of the Canadian League of Composers, his compositions encompass a broad repertoire from film scores and commercial jingles to sacred music and avant-garde electroacoustic music. He has composed numerous works for CBC Radio and CBC Television.

== Education and career ==
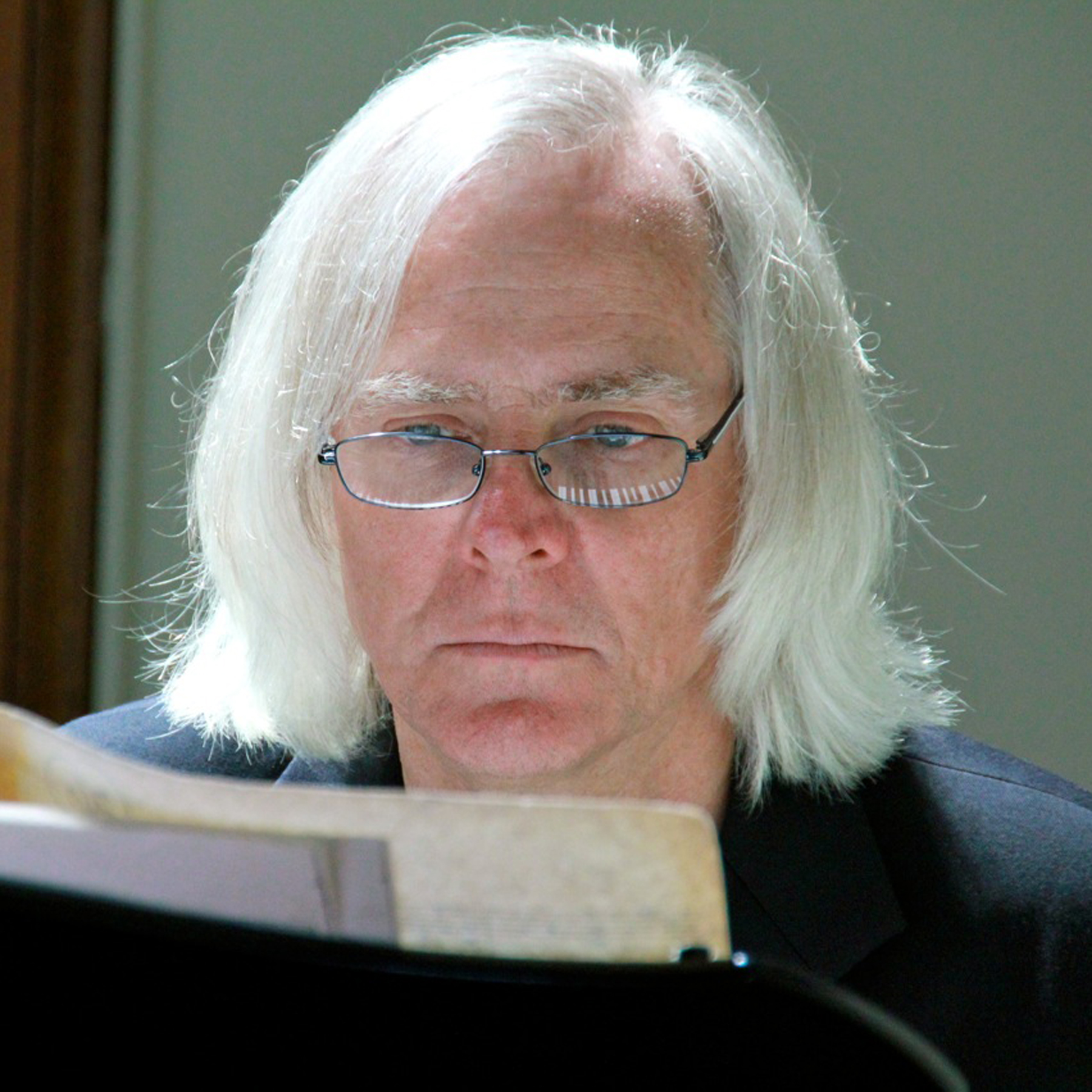
Peter Allen at the piano 2010

Born in Ottawa, Ontario, Allen was a pupil of Boyd McDonald and Robert Turner at the University of Manitoba where he earned a Bachelor of Music degree in 1975. Between 1976 and 1977 he pursued graduate studies at McGill University where his teachers included Bengt Hambraeus, Alcides Lanza, and Bruce Mather. During the 1970s he was a founding member of the contemporary concert series IZ Music, along with three other Manitoba composers; Bruce Carlson, William Pura and James Hiscott. Their concerts were regularly recorded by the CBC and broadcast on Two New Hours, CBC Radio Toronto. Allen also worked as a pianist with the Royal Winnipeg Ballet, and was active as a keyboardist with a number of local club and rock bands. In 1980 he became organist at St. Mary's Cathedral, Winnipeg and in 1984 was appointed music director for Pope John Paul II's papal mass outdoors at Bird's Hill Park in Winnipeg, for which he was also commissioned to compose a new mass setting. From 1985 to 1986 he worked for Century 21 Studios as their in-house composer and music producer.

Allen moved to Los Angeles, California in 1986 to pursue studies in film scoring at the University of California, Los Angeles and the University of Southern California. In 1988 he moved to Vancouver British Columbia to open his own recording and sound production studio, Peter Allen Associates Inc. He has composed music for more than 100 films for American, Canadian and British film companies, including Twentieth Century Fox, Paramount Pictures, Sony Pictures, Warner Brothers, Disney, Universal Pictures, CineTel Films, The National Film Board of Canada, the CBC, LifeTime, Hallmark as well as numerous independent film producers, and has written music for various television shows and series, including a theme song for the Winnipeg Jets in 1979, the broadcast theme for the Toronto Blue Jays, the Montreal Expos, the Winning Spirit theme for the Vancouver Canucks, and also the international broadcast theme for the 1994 Commonwealth Games. In October 2012, "Tear The Curtain", directed by Kim Collier, played on the Canadian Stage, the largest theatre stage in Canada. "Tear The Curtain" is a simultaneous mix of live theatre and film, and features a score by Peter Allen, both in the film segments and the live segments of the production. Peter worked with Kim Collier again in 2019 to create the score for "The Full Light of Day", which played at the Luminato Festival in Toronto in 2019. In 2003 he won a Leo Award for his score for the film Flower & Garnet and in 2019 for his score for the film Truly Madly Sweetly.

== Filmography ==
=== Films ===
Year	Title	Notes
1993	Cyborg 2: Glass Shadow	
1994	Crackerjack	
1995	Heaven's Tears	
1995	Dangerous Prey	
1995	For a Few Lousy Dollars	
1997	Crackerjack 2	
1997	Sleeping Dogs	
1998	Hell Mountain	
1998	Dark Confessions	
1998	Sparky Versus Rocco	Short Film
1998	Act of War	
1999	A Twist of Faith	
1999	Escape Velocity	
1999	The Silencer	
1999	Lethal Target	
2000	Bear with Me	
2000	Fatal Conflict	
2000	Crackerjack 3	
2000	The Operative	
2000	Last Stand	
2001	Ripper	
2002	Flower & Garnet	
2002	Starfire Mutiny	Direct-to-video
2002	The Barber	
2003	Casanova at Fifty	Short Film
2004	11:11	
2004	Ripper 2: Letter from Within	
2005	Sara Under Siege	Short Film
2005	Thralls	
2005	The Score	
2006	Shock to the System	
2007	A Dennis the Menace Christmas	Direct-to-video
2007	Blonde and Blonder	
2007	Tit for Tat	Short Film
2008	Scourge	
2008	Incident at a Truckstop Diner	Short Film
2008	On the Other Hand, Death	
2008	The Art of War II: Betrayal	Direct-to-video
2008	Ice Blues	
2008	Christmas Town	Direct-to-video
2009	The Cycle	
2009	Attention, the Doors Are Closing	Short Film
2009	Driven to Kill	Direct-to-video
2009	Damage	
2010	Dancing Ninja	
2010	The Stranger	Direct-to-video
2010	The Diner Suit	Short Film
2011	Pressed	
2011	Skew	
2011	Jesus Christ	Short Film
2011	Rise of the Damned	
2011	Dead Simple	Short Film
2011	Liz	Short Film
2012	American Mary	
2012	Now and Forever	Short Film (music written and performed)
2013	Out of Business	Short film
2013	Cup Runneth Over	Short film
2014	The Clockwork Girl	Feature Animation
2014	Toxin	
2015	A Perfect Wedding	
2016	Mostly Ghostly 3: One Night in Doom House	Direct-to-video
2017	Bigger Fatter Liar	Direct-to-video
2017	Selfie From Hell	Feature Film
2018	The Big Top Fury	Short Film
2023	If You're Reading This	Documentary

=== Television ===
Year	Title	Notes
1991	Tales from the Crypt	1 episode
1994	Metro Cafe	
1996	Downdraft	Television film
1997	Kleo the Misfit Unicorn	26 episodes
1997	Dead Fire	Television film
1998	The Other Side of the Picture	Documentary
1999	Escape from Mars	Television film
1999	Slightly Bent TV	
1999	Sasquatch Odyssey: The Hunt for Bigfoot	Documentary
2002	atHome	
2004	On Course	
2004	Deep Evil	Television film
2004	Happyland	Television film
2004	Eve's Christmas	Television film
2004	A Very Cool Christmas	Television film
2005	Steklo	Mini-series (3 episodes)
2005	Home for the Holidays	Television film
2005	His and Her Christmas	Television film
2006	Lesser Evil	Television film
2006	The Obsession	Television film
2006	Family in Hiding	Television film
2006	Deadly Skies	Television film
2006	Breaking Ranks	Documentary
2006	Four Extraordinary Women	Television film
2006	21st Annual Gemini Awards	Television special
2006	All She Wants for Christmas	Television film
2007	A Valentine Carol	Television film
2007	Witness to Murder	Television film
2007	Destination: Infestation	Television film
2008	The Afterlife with Suzane Northrop	Documentary (10 episodes)
2008	Let's Talk Sex	10 episodes
2008	Making Mr. Right	Television film
2008	Love Sick: Secrets of a Sex Addict]	Television film (international version)
2008	Mixed Nutz	
2009	Storm Seekers	Television film
2009	Black Rain	Television film
2009	Encounter with Danger	Television film
2009	Vancouver Vagabond	Documentary
2009	Health Nutz	Television film
2009	Something Evil Comes	Television film
2010	A Family Thanksgiving	Television film
2010	Two Men in a Boat: Chasing Spring	Documentary
2011	The Adventures of Artie the Ant	12 episodes
2011	Past Obsessions	Television film
2012	What's Up Warthogs!	19 episodes
2012	Broken Trust	Television film
2012	Love at the Thanksgiving Day Parade	Television film
2013	Health Nutz	7 episodes
2013	The Trainer	Television film
2013	Profile for Murder	Television film
2013	Forever 16	Television film
2014	Irreplaceable	Documentary
2014	My Mother's Future Husband	Television film
2014	The Color of Rain	Television film
2014	Recipe for Love	Television film
2014	Wedding Planner Mystery	Television film
2015	I Do, I Do, I Do	Television film
2015	The Wrong Girl	Television film
2015	Ties That Bind	9 episodes
2015	Angels in the Snow	Television film
2015	Debbie Macomber's Dashing Through the Snow	Television film
2016	Stop the Wedding	Television film
2016	Chesapeake Shores	1 episode
2016	Terres d'Exploration	Television mini-series documentary
2017	Nations at War	Documentary
2017	The Christmas Train	Television film
2018	Truly Madly Sweetly	Television film
2020	Charlie's Christmas Wish	Television film

=== Video games ===
Year	Title	Notes
2004	Spongebob Squarepants: A Day in the Life of a Sponge	

== Theatre ==
Year	Title	Notes
2008	Titus Andronicus	Bard On The Beach
2010	Tear The Curtain	Arts Club Theatre
2013	You Are Very Star	Electric Company Theatre
2019	The Full Light Of Day	Electric Company Theatre

== Awards ==
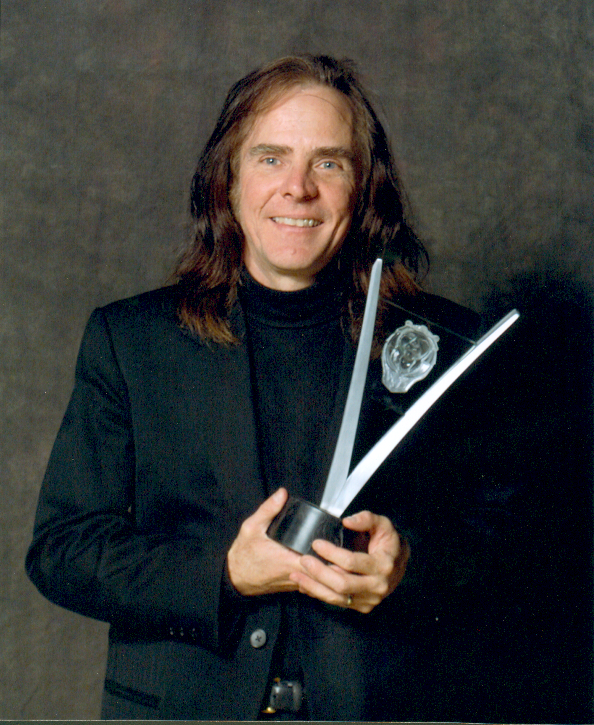
Peter Allen at the Leo Awards 2004

Year	Project	Category	Result
2000	A Twist of Faith	Best Musical Score in a Motion Picture (Leo Award)	Nominated
2002	The Barber	Feature Length Drama: Best Musical Score (Leo Award)	Nominated
2003	Casanova at Fifty	Short Drama: Best Musical Score (Leo Award)	Nominated
2003	Flower & Garnet	Feature Length Drama: Best Musical Score (Leo Award)	Won
2005	11:11	Feature Length Drama: Best Musical Score (Leo Award)	Nominated
2006	The Score	Best Music Score in a Feature Length Drama (Leo Award)	Nominated
2006	The Score	Best Original Music Score for a Program or Mini-Series (Gemini Award)	Nominated
2008	A Dennis the Menace Christmas	Best Musical Score in a Feature Length Drama (Leo Award)	Nominated
2008	Scourge	Best Music Score in a Feature Length Drama (Leo Award)	Nominated
2009	The Art of War II: Betrayal	Best Musical Score in a Feature Length Drama (Leo Award)	Nominated
2014	Destination: Infestation	Domestic Feature Film Award (SOCAN Award)	Won
2019	Truly, Madly, Sweetly	Best Musical Score in a Television Movie (Leo Award)	Won
2023	If You're Reading This	Best Musical Score in a Feature Length Documentary (Leo Award)	Nominated
