= Serge Houde =

Canadian actor

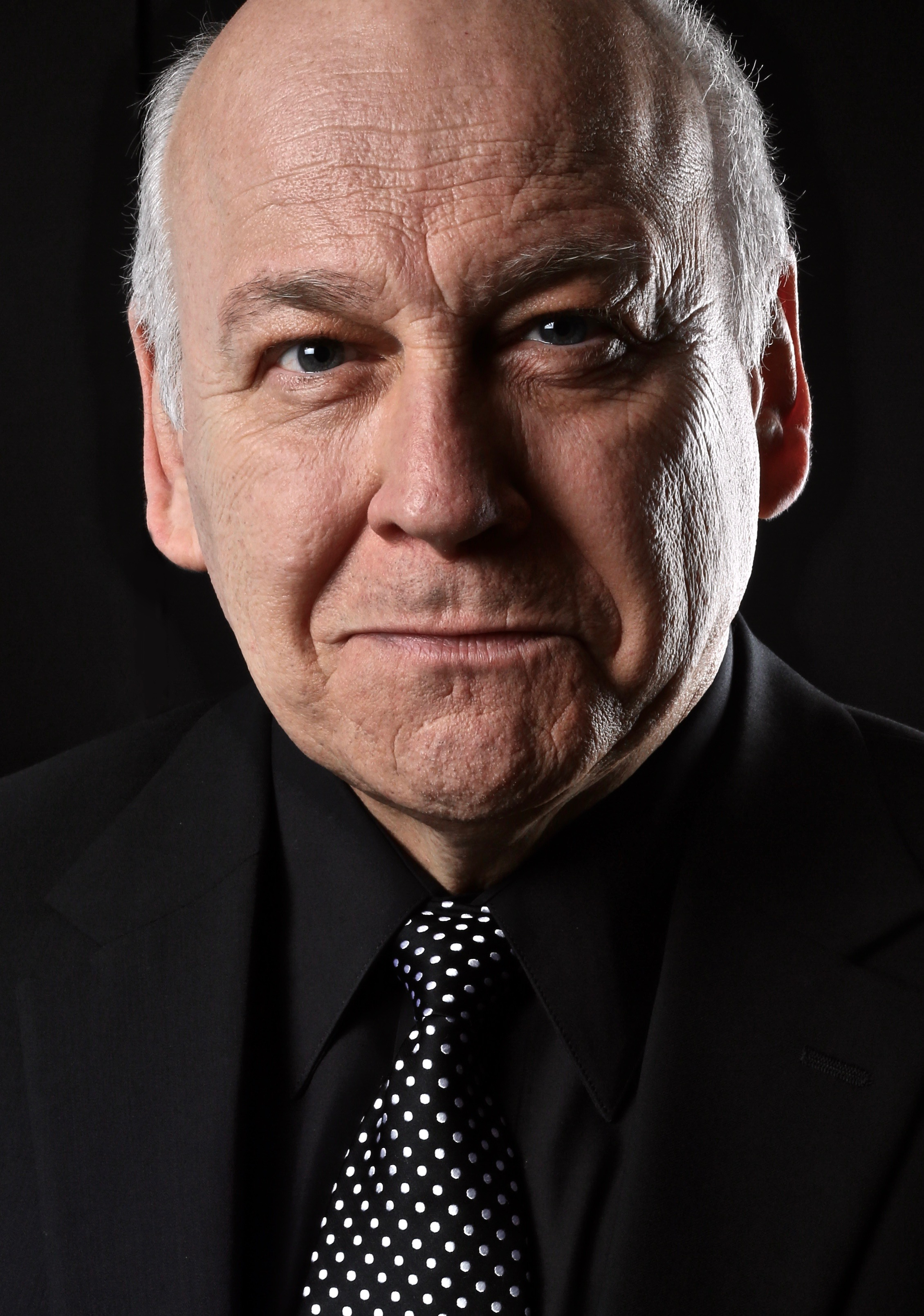
- Serge Houde
- Born: 16 February 1953 (age 73)
- Occupation: Actor
- Years active: 1989–present

Serge Houde (born February 16, 1953) is a Canadian film and television character actor.

He is best known for his role in Jon Cassar's Emmy-nominated miniseries The Kennedys playing the notorious Chicago mafia boss Sam Giancana opposite Tom Wilkinson and Barry Pepper.

GQ's Tom Carson said Houde's performance was "a terrific Sam Giancana (Serge Houde, and where has this formidable actor been all of Martin Scorsese's life?). It will probably set off Camelot guardians' alarm bells to hear that Giancana, the Chicago Mob boss, appears at all—and tête-à-tête with papa Joe, who's committing hubris's fatal error by negotiating with him."

== Biography ==
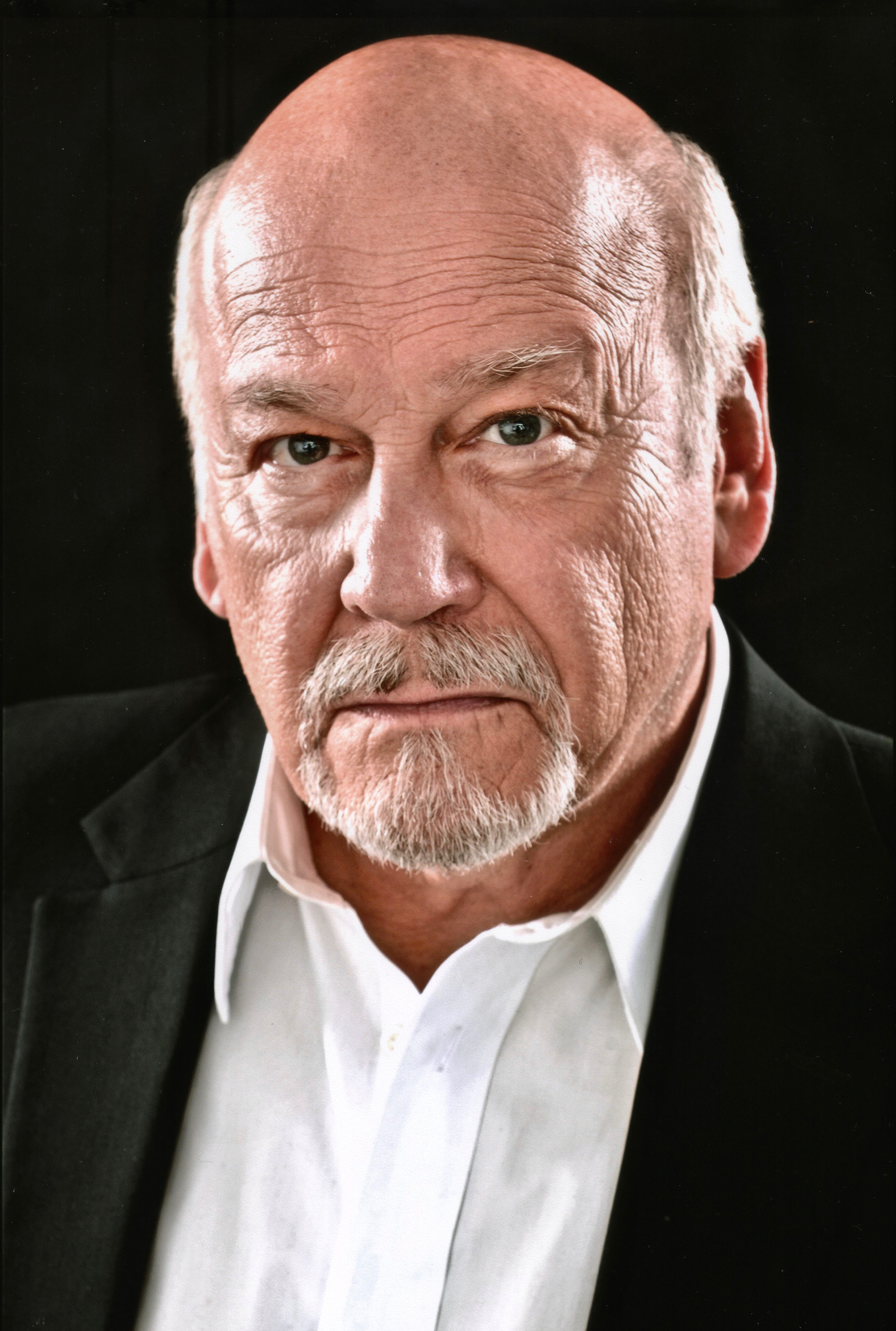
Serge Houde

Houde began acting at age 35, and he has over 160 film and TV productions to his credit.

Besides his role as Sam Giancana in The Kennedys, Houde also appeared in the Seth Rogen-starring feature, 50/50, which premiered at the Toronto International Film Festival in 2011. In it, he played Joseph Gordon-Levitt's character's father and Anjelica Huston's character's husband; his character suffered from Alzheimer's. He also starred as The Doctor in episode 9 of Mortal Kombat: Legacy, Kevin Tancharoen's web series anthology inspired by the popular video game of the same name.

In 2014, Houde received a Leo Award nomination for Best Guest Performance by a Male in a Dramatic Series for his role as drug kingpin David Thorpe on CTV's undercover cop series Played.

The following year, he attracted attention for his moving portrayal of a homeless man suffering from Tourette's in the hit Canadian police drama 19-2.

== Filmography ==
=== Film ===
List of films
Title	Year	Role	Director	Notes
Empire of Ash III	1989	2nd Shepherd	Michael Mazo; Lloyd A. Simandl	Feature film
The Resurrected	1991	Physician	Dan O'Bannon	Feature film
North of Pittsburgh	1992	Simpson	Richard Martin	Feature film
Stay Tuned	1992	Yogi Beer	Peter Hyams	Feature film
Love and Human Remains	1993	The Cowboy	Denys Arcand	Feature film
Tomcat: Dangerous Desires	1993	Dr. Pace	Paul Donovan	Direct-to-video
Look Who's Talking Now!	1993	Maitre D'	Tom Ropelewski	Feature film
Breaking Point	1994	IA investigator	Paul Ziller	Feature film
Octobre	1994	Pierre Laporte	Pierre Falardeau	Feature film
Windigo	1994	Major Binette	Robert Morin	Feature film
Black List	1995	Ministre Paul Rhéaume	Jean-Marc Vallée	Feature film
Highway of Heartache	1996	Clive Turnpike	Gregory Wild	Feature film
The Peacekeeper	1997	Secretary of Defense	Frederic Forestier	Feature film
Dancing on the Moon	1997	Joseph Morrison	Kit Hood	French version
The Jackal	1997	Beaufres	Michael Caton-Jones	Feature film
Little Men	1998	John Brooke	Rodney Gibbons	Feature film
Musketeers Forever	1998	Roland Locksley	Georges N. Chamchoum	Feature film
Sublet	1998	CIA Director Price	John Hamilton	Feature film
The Last Breath	1999	Sheriff Mitchum	Richard Ciupka	Feature film
Requiem for Murder	1999	P.M. Courtland	Douglas Jackson	Feature film
Taxman	1999	Frank Seymour	Alain Zaloum	Cameo appearance
Grey Owl	1999	Second Hunter	Richard Attenborough	Cameo appearance
Running Home	1999	Ray Vanloo	Marc F. Voizard	Feature film
Wilder	2000	Walker Grimes	Rodney Gibbons	Feature film
Traitor or Patriot	2000	Himself	Jacques Godbout	Documentary
Hidden Agenda	2001	Paul Elkert	Marc S. Grenier	Feature film
The Score	2001	Laurent	Frank Oz; Robert De Niro (uncredited)	Feature film
The Adventures of Pluto Nash	2002	Agent FBI	Ron Underwood	Cameo appearance
Paycheck	2003	William Dekker	John Woo	Feature film
The Perfect Score	2004	Kurt Dooling	Brian Robbins	Feature film
Manners of Dying	2004	Harry Parlington	Jeremy Peter Allen	Feature film
Eighteen	2005	Earl	Richard Bell	Feature film
The Rocket	2005	Connie Smythe	Charles Binamé	Feature film
Sisters	2006	Detective Kalen	Douglas Buck	Independent film
My Daughter, My Angel	2007	Robert Brault	Alexis Durand-Brault	Feature film
The Invisible	2007	Martin Egan	David S. Goyer	Feature film
Summit Circle	2007	Jean-Pierre Deniger	Bernard Émond	Feature film
La belle empoisonneuse	2007	M. Angelopoulos	Richard Jutras	Feature film
Still Life	2007	Shep	Jeffrey Blatt	Feature film
Boot Camp	2008	Karl	Christian Duguay	Feature film
The Day the Earth Stood Still	2008	Scientist #1	Scott Derrickson	Feature film
The American Trap	2008	Agent Thompson	Charles Binamé	Feature film
Personal Effects	2008	Judge Wettick	David Hollander	Feature film
Tomorrow	2009	Richard	Maxime Giroux	Feature film
Grace	2009	Henry Matheson	Paul Solet	Feature film
The Kate Logan Affair	2010	Sergeant McBean	Noël Mitrani	Feature film
Messages Deleted	2010	Det. Breedlove	Rob Cowan	Feature film
Diary of a Wimpy Kid: Rodrick Rules	2011	Mr. Salz	David Bowers	Feature film
50/50	2011	Richard Lerner	Jonathan Levine	Feature film
Dragons 3D	2013	Dr. Vulnet Grazinar (voice)	Marc Fafard	Short film
Lonesome Dove Church	2014	Charles Stone	Terry Miles	Feature film
Nine Lives	2016	Board Member Stein	Barry Sonnenfeld	Feature film
Boundaries	2016	Deputy Minister Dustin Torpe	Chloé Robichaud	Feature film
Coffee & Kareem	2020	Jerome	Michael Dowse	Streaming film

=== Television ===
List of programs television
Title	Year	Role	Notes
Murphy's Law	1988-1989	Ed	Television series
Wiseguy	1989	N.D. Agent / Agent #1	2 episodes
MacGyver	1989-1990	French Delegate / Lawyer	2 episodes
Neon Rider	1989-1990	Mr. Trumble	Episode: "Under Pressure"
Omen IV: The Awakening	1991	Morris Creighton	Television film
Fly by Night	1991	Rene	Episode: "Furs Flying"
Silent Motive	1991	Officer	Television film
Urban Angel	1992	Commander	Episode: "Deadly Force"
Space Cases	1996	Neinstein	Episode: "Forever Young"
Largo Winch	2001-2003	John Sullivan	35 episodes
Smallville	2002-2009	John Frankle / Priest	3 episodes
Supernatural	2006-2013	Ed Stoltz / Dr. Mason	2 episodes
The Kennedys	2011	Sam Giancana	4 episodes
Mortal Kombat: Legacy	2011	The Doctor	2 episodes
Played	2013	David Thorpe	Episode: "Drugs"
iZombie	2015-present	Donald Thorne	3 episodes
19-2	2015	Leon the Tourette's Guy	Episode: "Borders"
When Calls the Heart	2015	Judge Roy Parker	Episode: "Trials of the Heart"
Santa Hunters	2015	Principal Welsh	Television film
On the Farm	2016	Vancouver Mayor	Television film
Chesapeake Shores	2016-2019	Del Granger	10 episodes
The Wedding March	2016	Johnny	Television film
Somewhere Between	2017	Richard Ruskin	4 episodes
A Series of Unfortunate Events	2017	Milt	Episode: "The Hostile Hospital: Part One"
Trial & Error	2018	Milton Buckley / Houseboy	3 episodes
The Baker's Son	2021	Jean Pierre Duval	Television film
