= Ripper (film) =

2001 film by John Eyres

- DVD cover
- Directed by: John Eyres
- Screenplay by: Pat Bermel
- Story by: John Curtis; Evan Tylor
- Produced by: John Curtis; Evan Tylor
- Starring: A. J. Cook; Bruce Payne; Ryan Northcott; Claire Keim; Kelly Brook; Emmanuelle Vaugier; Daniella Evangelista
- Cinematography: Thomas M. Harting
- Edited by: Amanda I. Kirpaul
- Music by: Peter Allen
- Distributed by: Lions Gate Entertainment
- Release dates: 29 October 2001 (United Kingdom); 29 January 2002 (Canada)
- Running time: 114 minutes
- Countries: Canada; United Kingdom
- Language: English

Ripper (also known as Ripper: Letter from Hell in the United States) is a 2001 slasher film directed by John E. Eyres, and starring A. J. Cook and Bruce Payne. It was written and produced by John Curtis and Evan Tylor, and by production companies Prophecy Entertainment and Studio Eight Productions.

== Plot ==
Molly Keller narrowly avoids being murdered by a serial killer, after managing to escape an island. Five years later, she takes a forensic psychology class taught by Marshall Kane, a world-renowned expert on deviant violent offenders. Also taking the class are Jason Korda, Chantal Etienne, Marisa Tavares, Eddie Sackman, Mary-Anne Nordstrom, Andrea Carter and Aaron Kroeker. During one lesson, Marshall pranks his class by pretending to murder one of the students. His intention is to demonstrate the potential of anyone to be a killer. The unorthodox lesson prompts Aaron to reveal to Molly that he is aware of her past, which angers her as she does not want to discuss the trauma she endured. Her mood is further upset by Eddie when he attempts to hit on her, only to be firmly rejected.

Later that night, the group, excluding Aaron, meets for a study session which soon degenerates into an argument over Molly's overtly hostile attitude. To ease the mounting tension, they decide to go to a party taking place in a nearby abandoned building. Here, Jason makes a genuine attempt to get to know Molly better, but she remains distant. Marisa, meanwhile, has sex with a masked man, after which she overhears Chantal and Andrea talking about her. Feeling hurt, Marisa decides to leave, but the elevator instead takes her up to an isolated floor of the building. Upon stepping out of the elevator, Marisa is attacked and viciously stabbed by a masked assailant. In her panic, she stumbles and falls out of a window, but a chain wrapped around her ankle catches her, enabling the killer to hoist her back up, brutally stab her to death, and then send her body crashing through a window into the party below.

The next day, the group mourns Marisa's death and decides they will try and identify her killer. Molly meets Detective Kelso, who was part of the investigation of the previous murders. The pair goes to the murder scene where Detective Kelso warns Molly that he believes the killer is back.

Mary-Anne is driving home to see her family when a black truck begins to ram into the back of her car. She attempts to drive away, but the truck pushes her to the side of a cliff. As she attempts to get out, the truck hits her car again, causing her to crash through the windshield and plummet to her death. Detective Kelso finds her body in a nearby shed, where the killer has stabbed her repeatedly.

Molly challenges Marshall and shows the killer is following the pattern of the famous serial killer Jack the Ripper. Jason manages to persuade the group to continue investigating despite their doubt. Molly and Jason discover a murderer previously held Marshall hostage. Chantal kisses Jason but soon apologises to Molly for doing so, and the pair becomes friends. While Andrea is at the morgue identifying Mary-Anne's wounds, she is pursued by the killer, who drugs her before gutting her.

Jason, Chantal, and Eddie find out about Molly's past, which causes an argument resulting in Molly's removing herself from the group. The upset Molly is comforted by Marshall. The following night, Molly, Jason, Eddie, Chantal, and Marshall are taken to a cabin where they realize the victims share the same initials as Jack the Ripper's victims. Suspicion falls on Aaron, who had assembled the study group.

They attempt to phone Detective Kelso, but the phone is not working. After Molly and Chantal fall out, Eddie, Jason, and Chantal leave to try and fix the phone satellite on top of the mountain. Their car soon breaks down, forcing Jason to proceed on foot. Eddie attempts to fix the car, while Chantal remains inside. The killer soon appears and knocks out Chantal before Eddie's hand is trapped inside the bonnet of the car. Chantal wakes up, panics, and drives the car forward into a tree which crushes Eddie's back, killing him. The killer chases Chantal to a factory, where she accidentally activates a log splitting machine. She bumps into Aaron, who warns her he knows who the killer is. She tries to escape, but they fall into the machine and are mutilated by the circular saws.

Back at the cabin, Molly becomes suspicious of both Jason and Marshall. As Jason returns, Molly knocks him out before running into the forest. She encounters Jason again and flees while the killer hacks him to death with an axe. Molly discovers Marshall standing over Jason's body, before Detective Kelso arrives and knocks out Marshall. Molly then hallucinates and sees her younger self in the forest, gesturing to the two men and suggesting that it was Molly who killed them all. Later, Marshall is executed for the murders, and due to visible mental problems, Molly is committed to an insane asylum.

== Cast ==
- A. J. Cook as Molly Keller
- Bruce Payne as Marshall Kane
- Ryan Northcott as Jason Korda
- Claire Keim as Chantal Etienne
- Derek Hamilton as Eddie Sackman
- Daniella Evangelista as Mary-Anne Nordstrom
- Emmanuelle Vaugier as Andrea (Andy) Carter
- Kelly Brook as Marisa Tavares
- Jürgen Prochnow as Detective Kelso
- Courtenay J. Stevens as Aaron Kroeker

== Production ==
Ripper was filmed entirely in Victoria, British Columbia, Canada.

== Release ==
The film was rated R for violence/gore, sexuality, and language, and certificate 18 in the UK. It was released direct-to-DVD in many countries, including the UK, but received a theatrical run in some countries, including Canada.

== Reception ==
Andrew Smith stated that "it's hardly the most original out there and can get a bit too pompous for its own good but it’s a cut above the normal standards for straight-to-DVD slash". Smith also stated that "Bruce Payne is the best actor in display here and manages to eat up the screen with a solid performance to give us a sense that not all as it may seem with him (although that may just be down to the fact that he looks like a nasty piece of work!)". Similarly, Jim Harper stated that Payne was "appropriately creepy as the man who's spent too long working with lunatics", and John Fallon stated that "Bruce Payne brings a touch of class to the film." Ben Pollock stated that the film was "not the most original thriller available, but... is very entertaining nonetheless, and holds enough genuine thrills to sustain two hours of nail-biting". Robert Pardy, writing for the TV Guide, described the film as "good creepy fun". G. Noel Gross stated that "this latest Ripper ode is meant to coat-tail From Hell, but winds up resembling something unpleasant stuck to Johnny Depp's boots". In Richard Scheib's view "in the end, Ripper: Letter from Hell and its Jack the Ripper angle amounts to nothing more than another variation on the modern 90s/00s teen slasher films where the killer uses an improbable novelty motif – scary movies in Scream (1996), urban legends in Urban Legend (1998), Valentine’s Day in Valentine (2001) and so on".

== Sequel ==
Ripper 2: Letter from Within is a 2004 British horror film featuring, again, the character Molly Keller, and it is about a treatment for her in a virtual world.
