= Selfie from Hell =

- Official release poster
- Directed by: Erdal Ceylan
- Written by: Erdal Ceylan; Paul Burton
- Produced by: Paul Burton
- Starring: Alyson Walker; Tony Giroux; Meelah Adams; Ian Butcher; Tyler A.H. Smith; Shaun Morse; Matthew Graham
- Cinematography: Jeremy Walter Cox
- Edited by: Jason Hujber; Hanno von Contzen
- Music by: Peter Allen
- Production company: IndustryWorks Studios
- Distributed by: Viva Pictures
- Release date: May 4, 2018
- Running time: 73 minutes
- Country: Canada
- Language: English

Selfie from Hell (marketed on home video as Selfie Man) is a 2018 Canadian horror film written and directed by Erdal Ceylan. It originally started as a short 2015 YouTube video with the same title. The film stars Alyson Walker, Tony Giroux, Meelah Adams, Ian Butcher, Tyler A.H. Smith, Shaun Morse, and Matthew Graham.

It was released on May 4, 2018, by Viva Pictures and received generally negative reviews.

== Premise ==
Julia leaves Germany to visit her cousin Hannah. After Julia enters a coma, Hannah finds out about the shadowy figure that appears in her cousin's selfies and that she is dealing with a supernatural force from the dark web.

== Cast ==
- Alyson Walker as Hannah
- Tony Giroux as Trevor
- Meelah Adams as Julia
- Ian Butcher as F34R3473R
- Tyler A.H. Smith as Selfie Man
- Shaun Morse as Dr. Edwards
- Matthew Graham as Dr. Jonas

== Release ==
The film was released online on May 4, 2018, by Viva Pictures.

== Reception ==
Chris Knight of the National Post gave a negative review stating, "The rambling plot dashes from one techno-fear to the next with barely time for its 30 or so jump-scares. Online videos! Blocked caller ID! Cracked screens! Red Rooms! Black Rooms!" Ken Eisner of The Georgia Straight also wrote a negative review stating, "At its most creative, Selfie hints at grisly abstractions recalling David Lynch and Under the Skin. But everything is so rushed, eros-free, and sketchy, the filmmakers must rely on booming sound effects and tired found-footage tropes to sell a story that, scarily enough, didn't quite make it out of screenwriting purgatory." Stuart Heritage of The Guardian wrote an article about this and similar horror films.
