= Wrecker (film) =

- Film poster
- Directed by: Micheal Bafaro
- Screenplay by: Micheal Bafaro
- Story by: Evan Tylor; Micheal Bafaro
- Produced by: Evan Taylor; John Curtis; Don Knodel; Micheal Bafaro
- Starring: Anna Hutchison; Drea Whitburn; Jennifer Koenig; Michael Dickson; Kurtis Maguire; Andy Nez; Lori Watt; Steve Thackray; Dylan Rhymer
- Cinematography: Jon Thomas; Ian MacDougall
- Edited by: C. J. Wallis; Karilynn Ming Ho
- Music by: Vince Mai
- Production company: Industryworks Studios
- Distributed by: XLrator Media; Industryworks Pictures
- Release date: November 6, 2015
- Running time: 83 minutes
- Country: Canada
- Language: English

Wrecker is a 2015 Canadian horror film written and directed by Micheal Bafaro. It stars Anna Hutchison and Drea Whitburn as friends on a road trip who are menaced by a psychopathic tow truck driver. The plot is very similar to the 1970's movie Duel (1971 film). It premiered on November 6, 2015.

== Plot ==
A husband and wife driving a 1973 Ford Torino station wagon become stranded on a stretch of road known as Devil's Pass. When their cell phone reception cuts out, they wait for help.

Elsewhere, Emily joins her friend Leslie on a road trip after she becomes frustrated with her boyfriend, whom she believes may have cheated on her. Emily drives their Ford Mustang as Leslie begins drinking beer. At a fork, Leslie stops Emily and suggests they take Devil's Pass. After deliberating, Emily agrees.

Before long, they become stuck behind a foul-smelling tow truck towing the earlier couple's car. Annoyed that the driver does not pull over to let them pass, Leslie curses the driver after they speed past it. As the women pull into a gas station, they see the truck follow them. Emily sees the driver's boots but nothing else. The gas station attendant checks the oil in the Mustang and warns them that it is low. Wanting to avoid unnecessary confrontation, the women pull out without topping up the oil.

The truck driver follows them, so Emily allows it to pass her. As it slows down in front of them, Emily attempts to pass it, only to be waved ahead into oncoming traffic. Shaken, the women speed ahead of it and nearly hit two children in a residential area. Emily and Leslie pull off the road to a diner, only to become nervous when they realize the tow truck driver is also parked there. They confront a patron they believe to be the driver, but he leaves in a different vehicle. A waitress asks them to leave for causing a scene, and they cautiously return to the highway.

They find the couple's car, which the tow truck had previously been towing, abandoned on a bridge facing the wrong direction. A man driving a pickup truck and trailer stops to aid them, and they quickly explain their ordeal. The abandoned car will not start, so the man pushes while Emily steers, but the tow truck reappears and hits the car while Emily is in it. She quickly gets out. The women warn off the pickup truck driver and fearfully speed off. The tow truck continues following them, eventually driving them off the road with a flat tire. As the women flee on foot, Emily trips and falls on a rock, and passes out for a while. When she wakes, Leslie is gone, and the car's tire has been changed.

Not knowing what else to do, Emily returns to the road, only to become spooked by other trucks. She pulls off the road and sleeps for a while, having a nightmare about Leslie. When she wakes, she continues down Devil's Pass until a police officer stops her. Excited to find help, Emily tells the skeptical officer about the trucker. Before she can convince him, the tow truck runs him over, leaving him dead in the road. The trucker hitches the police officer's vehicle to his truck and drives off, confusing Emily. She takes the dead cop's gun and returns to her own car, which has again ran low on gas.

Emily forgets she is holding the pistol when she stops at a gas station, but uses it to force the attendant to give her gas. As she uses a pay phone to contact the police, the tow truck appears again and destroys the phone booth. Emily flees in the Mustang, which alerts her to engine trouble now that she has ignored the oil for too long. Knowing she can no longer outrun the tow truck, she engages it in a game of chicken. She drives straight toward it and the truck swerves toward a steep cliff, balancing precariously on the edge.

Emily approaches the truck and demands to know what happened to Leslie. The trucker does not answer and continues attempting to back up from the edge. As she approaches closer, she hears a cell phone go off and runs back to the car. The ringing leads her to the trunk, which she slowly opens, dreading what she will find. She is horrified to see what is in the trunk (implied to be Leslie's dead body). Emily backs up the Mustang and rams the tow truck, which falls off the cliff, sustaining severe damage and landing on it side. Assuming the tow truck driver to be dead, Emily drives away in the damaged Mustang.

Later, a woman in a Ford Focus pulls into a junkyard looking for help to fix a mechanical problem. The junkyard contains the Torino, the police cruiser, the pickup truck and trailer, and the tow truck, now seemingly undamaged. The tow truck starts up.

== Production ==
Bafaro came up with the film's concept when he overheard two women argue at a remote gas station. He was inspired by Duel, The Vanishing, and Breakdown. Bafaro was inspired by Duel not to reveal the driver, saying that it makes the film "more thrilling". Star Hutchison was also a fan of Duel, but said that it focused entirely on males. She was drawn to the script because it has more of a focus on females. Bafaro said the film's main theme is abusive relationships: the trucker and the women seem to at first have a normal relationship, but it becomes increasingly abusive. Shooting took place around Vancouver, Canada. Some scenes were shot in the Fraser Canyon near Lytton.

== Release ==
XLrator Media released Wrecker to cinemas on November 6 and on video on demand on November 10, 2015. It was released on DVD on January 5, 2016.

== Reception ==
The film received generally negative reviews. Dennis Harvey of Variety called the film a "low-budget ripoff" of Duel that suffers for the absence of both Dennis Weaver and the expected exploitative content. Frank Scheck of The Hollywood Reporter, in comparing it negatively to Duel, wrote, "Director Bafaro shows little aptitude for the driving sequences, which are stunningly dull in their repetitiveness and lack of visual flair." Maitland McDonagh of Film Journal International wrote, "Pitched somewhere between Duel and Joy Ride, this motor-psycho picture fails to stake out new territory or ring any significant changes on a decades-old formula." Noel Murray of the Los Angeles Times also compared it negatively to Duel, saying that it reworks Duel into a film with "two nondescript heroes instead of one" and a series of boring cuts between the two vehicles. Joel Harley of Starburst rated it 5/10 stars and wrote, "It's fast, slick and lovely to look at, but there's absolutely nothing there beneath the hood." Chuck Bowen of Slant Magazine rated it 1.5/4 stars and called it "an undistinguished entry" that "offers minor pleasures" despite its lack of payoff. Matt Boiselle of Dread Central rated it 2/5 stars and wrote, "[T]his was one of the more repetitious, haphazardly, and ultimately boring series of chases I've seen in a long time." Mark L. Miller of Ain't It Cool News wrote, "I really would rather recommend Duel any day of the week before I would tell someone they should check out Wrecker."
