= Highway of Heartache =

- Directed by: Gregory Wild
- Written by: Gregory Wild
- Produced by: Gregory Wild
- Starring: Barbara Chamberlin; Serge Houde; Klaus Kohlmeyer; Pat Patterson
- Cinematography: Brian Pearson
- Edited by: Reginald Harkema
- Music by: Barbara Chamberlin
- Distributed by: Scorn-a-rama
- Release date: August 11, 1994
- Running time: 86 minutes
- Country: Canada
- Language: English

Highway of Heartache is a Canadian musical comedy film, directed by Gregory Wild and released in 1994.

The film follows the misadventures of Wynona-Sue Turnpike (Barbara Chamberlin, who also wrote the film's score) on a raucous and unlikely road to Nashville superstardom. Backed up by a pair of drag queen guardian angels (played by The Big Wigs), Wynona-Sue faces a variety of indignities including her abusive husband Clive (Serge Houde), the threat of life imprisonment and venereal disease. The film's humor ranged from gross-out to surreal (the heroine's gynecologist was an Elvis Presley imitator), and the entire film was shot on Day-Glo sets designed and built by Wild.

The film received a one-night preview screening in Vancouver, Wild's hometown, at a fundraiser for the Vancouver Meals Society on August 11, 1994, before having its official theatrical premiere at the 1994 Toronto International Film Festival.

== Critical response ==
Critical reaction was mixed: Stephen Holden of The New York Times complained of a "gratingly hysterical pitch [that] makes a John Waters romp look like a Merchant-Ivory reverie…what began as a screaming Day-Glo comedy turns into a sensory endurance test." For the Toronto Star, Craig Macinnis opined that "Cinematically, Highway of Heartache is little more than a pile of kitschy set pieces, which Wild spatters with random bodily fluids then festoons with obese drag queens, erect phalluses and other niceties. If satire was intended, satire is not achieved. Highway of Heartache is lower, and sleazier, than the things it alleges to spoof. Worse, though, it betrays a puritanical spirit, scornful and intolerant of human weakness."

Ken Eisner of Variety dubbed it "the weirdest feature yet to come out of Canada" and "consistently funny", stating that the film married "John Waters’ taste to a beyond-Douglas Sirk plot".

== Cast ==
- Barbara Chamberlin as Wynona-Sue Turnpike
- Serge Houde as Clive Turnpike
- Klaus Kohlmeyer
- Pat Patterson as Crawfish
- Willie Taylor
