= The Cycle (2009 film) =

- Directed by: Micheal Bafaro
- Written by: Micheal Bafaro
- Starring: Daryl Hannah; Leah Gibson; Luke Camilleri; Lee Tomaschefski; Maria Gruending; Jeb Beach; Daniel Probert; Twan Holliday
- Cinematography: Shaun Lawless
- Edited by: Brae Norwiss
- Music by: Peter Allen; John Sereda
- Release date: 2009
- Countries: Canada; Czech Republic
- Language: English

The Cycle, also known as The Devil's Ground, is a 2009 Canadian/Czech horror film written and directed by Micheal Bafaro. The movie was filmed during a fifteen-day period.

== Plot summary ==
A young woman named Amy Singer (Leah Gibson) is fleeing a masked, black-clad man wielding a machete (Twan Holliday). A female driver named Carrie Mitchel (Daryl Hannah) is pressured to stay the night at a local motel by Jimmy (also Holliday), but refuses. She drives on and nearly hits Amy, who persuades Carrie to take her to the next town. Amy tells Carrie her story.

She and four Boston University students came to the area to look for a Native American burial ground in Bradford, Pennsylvania. The area was due to become a mine and their professor had promised them a pass grade if they found evidence of the burial ground. En route to the town, they stop to get gas and all but Amy end up mocking the gas station's owner Billy (Daniel Probert) for his hillbilly appearance, speech and lack of hands. This prompts him to warn Amy not to go up to the burial ground, which he calls the "Devil's Playground".

The group ignores Billy's warnings and continue to the site of the burial ground. Their dig is met with almost immediate setbacks when their Winnebago is shaken during the night and their tools are stolen. They find evidence of the ancient burial ground and other evidence that suggests that a serial killer has been using the area to bury his victims. The group is unable to call the police because they are each killed off by the masked man. Only Amy manages to survive, runs to the gas station run by Billy and pleads with him for help. He calls the killer—his developmentally-disabled brother, Tobey. Amy then learns that the birth defects of Billy and Tobey were the result of chemicals released during a mining accident in 1967 and that the two brothers kill because of their bitterness towards the world. She is nearly raped and killed, which is when she flees and encounters Carrie.

Carrie explains that she is driving the same route that her partner took before disappearing. They stop at a gas station for fuel and for Carrie to call the police, but they do not believe her story, telling her that Amy Singer died five years ago. At this point, Jimmy re-appears and explains that Amy is a ghost and that each year she appears on the same stretch of road on which she died. Jimmy also explains that the gas station they are now at is the same one (albeit rebuilt) that was previously owned by Billy, who has since died. Tobey now arrives and Jimmy intervenes to save Carrie, but is shot and killed by the young gas station attendant, who turns out to be Billy's son. The film ends with Tobey swinging his machete down on Carrie.

== Cast ==
- Daryl Hannah as Carrie Mitchel
- Leah Gibson as Amy Singer
- Luke Camilleri as Mike
- Lee Tomaschefski as Lisa
- Maria Gruending as Tammy
- Jeb Beach as Greg
- Daniel Probert as Billy
- Twan Holliday as Tobey/Jimmy

== Reception ==
JoBlo gave a mixed review for the film, saying that it "teeters on the edge of being a pretty terrific killer in the woods film" but that "with a few moments of characters doing moronic things, and a thrill-less and much too long exposition, the flame is a little dull".
