= Empire of Ash III =

1989 film by Michael Mazo

- Directed by: Michael Mazo; Lloyd A. Simandl
- Written by: John Eyres
- Screenplay by: Chris Maruna
- Story by: Lloyd A. Simandl
- Produced by: Sharon Christensen; Janice Curtis
- Starring: Melanie Kilgour; William Smith; Ken Farmer; Scott Anderson; Nancy Pataki; Joe Maffei; Tanya Orton
- Cinematography: Danny Nowak
- Edited by: Bert Bush; Joseph Fitzpatrick
- Music by: John Sereda; The Gore Avenue Sound Project
- Production company: North American Pictures
- Distributed by: North American Releasing
- Release date: 1989
- Running time: 98 minutes
- Country: Canada
- Language: English
- Budget: CAD$500,000

Empire of Ash III is a 1989 Canadian post-apocalyptic science fiction film directed by Lloyd A. Simandl and Michael Mazo and starring Melanie Kilgour, William Smith and Ken Farmer. In the U.S., it was released as Last Of The Warriors. It is a sequel to the 1988 movie known as Empire of Ash, Empire of Ash II or Maniac Warriors.

== Plot ==
In 2050, sometime after a nuclear war, much of the ruling elite has succumbed to a disease that requires a transfusion of blood. Bands of militaristic, government-sanctioned band of nomads called the Warriors, led by the Baalca, forcibly use needles to extract healthy blood from unwilling females and deliver it to the rulers. Zak and Iodine are regarded as a subversive threat to the blood bank troops. Danielle rescues loner Lucas, who later returns the favor and assists her in assembling a group for her sister's rescue as they try to stop the blood harvesting.

== Cast ==
- William Smith as Lucas
- Ken Farmer as Chuck
- Melanie Kilgour as Danielle
- Scott Anderson as Harris
- Nancy Pataki as Baacla
- Tanya Orton as Claudia
- Joe Maffei as Iodine
- Andrew MacGregor as Zak
- Serge Houde as 2nd Shepherd
- Tim Chapman as Raider

== Production ==
The film was the second collaboration between Canada's North American Pictures and Wales' EGM International, after Slow Burn, which starred William Smith. Early press materials suggested that the film might be co-directed by North American's Lloyd Simandl and EGM's John Eyres, but Simandl and his usual partner Michael Mazo ended up being credited. North American Pictures used the proceeds of the first Empire of Ash to finance the sequel. It also received some subsidies from B.C. Films, a recently created lottery-funded support program. The project was budgeted at CAD$500,000 (about US$400,000 at the time). Principal photography started on June 4, 1988, and lasted until the end of the month. Like its predecessor, the picture was shot in 16 mm. Filming took place in the Mission and Abbotsford–Matsqui areas of British Columbia, Canada, and it was billed as the first feature shot in the latter. Locales visited included the Ruskin Dam, Dewdney Slough, and several spots on Sumas Mountain: the Kilgard open pit mine, the Cox Landing quarry and the Heritage Valley resort, which served as residence for most of the crew.

The stunt coordinator, Ben Derrick of Mission, announced stunts such as a full body burn, a helicopter drop and a 100-feet motorcycle jump, some of which were touted as "never before attempted in Canada." The movie was noted for various BDSM-themed scenes, which harkened back to Simandl's earlier works. One article stated that the film's team numbered 98 people, of which 90 were Canadian. According to another, 103 extras were used, of which 83 were from the Abbotsford area. The Grand Shepherd's car was a 1968 Ford Fairlane customized by a group of Fraser Valley College welding students, based on a design from art director Brian Maxwell Drummond-Hay. The so-called "Battle Wagon" was a 1956 Sicard Industries truck previously used by the RCAF as a runway snow plow. Following the shoot, some of the film's vehicles were exhibited on July 1 at the Historic Transportation Centre in Surrey.

== Release ==
=== Pre-release ===
Empire of Ash III was pre-sold at the 1988 Cannes Film Market, as part of North American Releasing's nine-picture portfolio. Actress Melanie Kilgour doubled as an international sales executive for NAR.

=== Television ===
The film received its domestic premiere on premium cable channel First Choice on December 12, 1989.

=== Home video ===
In the U.S., the film was released in 1992 by A.I.P. Home Video. A French-language Canadian tape was also issued in 1994 through Excalibur Distribution, a sister label of North American. (Note: Below the French title Les guerriers de la route, the boxcover mentions the U.S. title of the first installment, Maniac Warriors, and uses captures from that film. However, the summary and credits indicate that this is in fact the sequel, Empire of Ash III. In France, Empire of Ash III is also known as Les guerriers de la route.)

== Reception ==
Empire of Ash III was very poorly received by critics. TV Guide granted that "the romantic leads are personable" but found "no saving graces" with anything else, blasting a "slovenly photographed and sluggishly directed" film, plagued by "the amateurish playing of the remaining cast" and "half asleep" special effects. (Note: The review's title refers to the first installment Maniac Warriors, but it is an error and the review's body concerns the sequel Last of the Warriors.) John Stanley, author of the Creature Features series of books, wrote that the film "is not simply below average — it's beneath contempt.[...] And what's a good actor like William Smith doing as the evil leader who now rules Earth?" He added that he only "lasted 60 minutes through this atrocity." In his opus Horror and Science Fiction Films, Donald C. Willis concurred and called the film an "atrocious sf-actioner", comparing it to Donald G. Jackson's Roller Blade. Ballantine Books' Video Movie Guide further panned it as a "[r]idiculous futuristic dud" and a "real time waster." The review committee for Joe Bob Briggs' newsletter The Joe Bob Report called it a "'Dark, grim' 'pretty dull' 'real bad' post-apocalypse thriller that 'rips off Mad Max' but is 'much less interesting than most of its type.'"

== Soundtrack ==
The soundtrack features a cover of the Canadian song "Born to be Wild," made famous by Steppenwolf, and here performed by Tom Lavin.

== Related projects ==
During production, it was announced that the script for a third installment was already being worked on, but that did not eventuate. North American Releasing also pitched another collaboration with actor William Smith, called The Peace Officer, but it does not seem to have panned out either.
