= Time Runner =

- VHS cover
- Directed by: Michael Mazo
- Written by: Chris Hyde; Greg Derochie; Ron Tarrant; Ian Bray; Michael Mazo; John A. Curtis
- Produced by: Lloyd A. Simandl; John A. Curtis
- Starring: Mark Hamill; Rae Dawn Chong; Brion James; Mark Baur; Gordon Tipple
- Cinematography: Danny Nowak
- Edited by: Michelle Bjornson
- Music by: Braun Farnon; Robert Smart
- Production companies: North American Pictures; Excalibur Pictures
- Distributed by: Cineplex Odeon Films
- Release date: February 16, 1993
- Running time: 90 minutes
- Country: Canada
- Language: English

Time Runner is a 1993 Canadian science fiction action film directed by Michael Mazo, starring Mark Hamill, Rae Dawn Chong and Brion James. Hamill plays a 21st century soldier who is unwittingly teleported to 1992, and teams up with a scientist (Chong) to prevent an alien race from gaining an advantage in its future war against mankind.

== Plot ==
An alien force attacks Earth on October 6, 2022. Aboard a military space station, Captain Michael Raynor, faces the loss of his wife, and escapes before the aliens destroy it. A wormhole appears and sends him thirty years into the past, where he crash-lands on Earth. He goes into hiding, and tries to get a bearing on where he is.

Meanwhile, two scientists discover Raynor's escape pod, and analyze its origins before operatives from the Intelligence and Security Command (ISC) take custody of the unit. The scientists analyze some of the unit's components and discover that it is from the future, having found that a certain Indiana electronics company named in the parts doesn't exist. Upon discovering what time period he is in, Raynor tries to escape the ISC agents, making contact with the scientists and explains his origins. They recover a flight recorder and destroy the escape pod. Having seen the data in the flight recorder, they decide to find Senator John Neila, who is in the midst of a re-election campaign, explain to him about the invasion. However, Raynor discovers that Neila and the ISC agents are the aliens themselves, having been planted years before as sleeper operatives; one of the scientists, Karen Donaldson, is also revealed to be an alien, turning over the flight recorder to them. Raynor sees visions of his pregnant mother being killed by an assassin. Knowing that he was about to be born in a few hours' time, Raynor scrambles to save his mother while Neila tasks Donaldson to ensure it never happens.

Flash forward to the future and it is revealed that the aliens gain the advantage and attack a secret base in Capitol Hill, where the humans try to launch a nuclear strike while making their last stand. Neila, who is now the Earth's President, asks the launch crew to allow him to negotiate with the aliens, but lulls one man into giving up his revolver, allowing Neila to kill the launch crew and ensure victory for the aliens.

Flashing back to 1992, Raynor kills the assassin and convinces his mother to go with him—just as she goes into labor. The baby is delivered en route, but his mother dies, and Donaldson brings the baby to Neila. Having a change of heart upon cradling the baby, Karen protects the child from Neila. In a last-ditch effort, Raynor pushes Neila off a tall construction plant to his death while Arnie kills Freeman, the lead ISC agent. With Neila dead in 1992, the future Neila disappears from existence as well, but the adult Raynor also screams in pain before dissipating as well, leaving Karen and Arnie with the baby Raynor.

== Cast ==
- Mark Hamill as Captain Michael Raynor
- Rae Dawn Chong as Karen Donaldson
- Brion James as US Senator John Neila
- Mark Baur as Freeman
- Gordon Tipple as Arnie
- John Maclaren as Carl Withers
- John Thomas as Simms
- Barry W. Levy as Bryant
- Allan Forget as Murphy
- Charlie Fleming as Clive Dawson
- Saraphina Joachim as Dorothy Raynor
- Clif Kosterman as Lawson

== Production ==
=== Development and writing ===
The film's working title was In Exile. It was pitched to producers Lloyd Simandl and John Curtis of North American Releasing and sister company Excalibur Pictures by special effects artist Greg Derochie, who had worked on their previous project, Xtro II. Like that film, it was originally more of a creature feature, but Curtis steered the project into its eventual direction. The first draft by Derochie and Ron Tarrant was still being written in March 1991, when the producers traveled to the American Film Market to promote the film on the basis of a treatment. As was common at the time, financing relied on pre-sales, with the U.K., Japan and South Korea territories bringing in a combined advance of CAD$500,000 during the event, which the filmmakers deemed encouraging at that stage.

=== Filming ===
Filming was originally slated for late spring or July 1991. It instead took place from September 12 to October 17, 1991. The Vancouver metropolitan area (where North American Pictures was based) provided urban settings, with Senator Neila's political rally filmed at the Plaza of Nations on September 24. A sixty person high school marching band was shuttled on short notice from the neighboring U.S. state of Washington for the occasion, and local residents were invited to show up on location to make up the crowd. The later part of the shoot was spent in the Okanagan Valley, which was chosen about one year before production. The crew moved to Kelowna on October 3, and subsequently visiting the locales of Joe Rich, Summerland and Gallagher's Canyon until October 17. During filming, it was announced that the film was made with a PG-13 rating in mind, although it ended up being rated R.

== Release ==
=== Theatrical ===
Time Runner opened in Toronto on February 16, 1993. In Montreal, the film opened later on March 12. It was distributed domestically by Cineplex Odeon Films.

=== Home media ===
In the U.S., Time Runner premiered on VHS through New Line Home Video on March 17, 1993. The Canadian tape followed on March 31, via Cineplex Odeon Home Video.

== Critical reception ==
Time Runner was poorly received by critics. Norman Wilner of The Toronto Star was most negative. Pointing to several inconsistencies within the film, he wrote that it was "more of an endurance test than a cinematic experience", as well as "a stupid, pitiful embarrassment" which "even the most undiscriminating science-fiction fans (the movie's target audience) will hate". Marc Horton of the Edmonton Journal found that "Mark Hamill tarnishes whatever is left of his reputation with this clumsy, thoughtless, made-in-Canada sci-fi flick." He deemed the writing "unintentionally funny" in places and Chong "monumentally disinterested". The only redeeming feature was "explosions galore which, if you squint your eyes until they're almost closed, look somewhat less cheap than they really are".

South of the border, opinions were along the same lines. Lawrence O'Toole of Entertainment Weekly described it as "a genially dumb B-movie with plenty of gunfire and what-are-we-gonna-do-now? dialogue", and noted that while "[s]ix screenwriters are credited; more were needed". Leonard Maltin called it "silly, poorly plotted, badly presented."

== See also ==
- Laserhawk, another alien invasion film produced by John Curtis and starring Mark Hamill
