= Harley Cokeliss =

American actor (born 1945)

- Born: Harley Cokliss; February 11, 1945 (age 81); San Diego, California, U.S.
- Education: London Film School
- Occupations: Film and television director, producer, screenwriter, actor
- Awards: Oulu International Children's and Youth Film Festival Starboy Award

Harley Cokeliss (born Harley Louis Cokliss, February 11, 1945) is an American director, writer and producer of film and television.

== Early life ==
Originally brought up in Chicago, he moved to Britain in 1966 to study at the London Film School, and spent the majority of his career in the UK.

== Career ==
Cokeliss started making documentaries for British television in 1970, including the first filmed version of J. G. Ballard's story Crash!. Papers relating to the film Crash! are available at the British Library (Add MS 89171/1). Cokeliss's initial treatment and Ballard's draft script for Crash! are published in Crash: The Collector's Edition, ed. Chris Beckett. He returned to Chicago in 1972 to make a documentary about blues musicians in the city.

Cokeliss later graduated to making feature films, serving as second unit director on The Empire Strikes Back before helming films like Battletruck, Black Moon Rising, and Malone. He wrote and directed the 1988 horror film Dream Demon. He has directed episodes of various television series, including The New Adventures of Robin Hood, CI5: The New Professionals, and Xena: Warrior Princess.

== Filmography ==
=== Film ===
| Year | Title | Director | Writer | Producer |
|---|---|---|---|---|
| 1972 | Chicago Blues | Yes | No | Yes |
| 1977 | The Battle of Billy's Pond | Yes | Yes | No |
| 1977 | The Glitterball | Yes | Yes | No |
| 1979 | That Summer! | Yes | No | No |
| 1982 | Warlords of the 21st Century | Yes | No | No |
| 1986 | Black Moon Rising | Yes | No | No |
| 1987 | Malone | Yes | No | No |
| 1988 | Dream Demon | Yes | Yes | No |
| 2000 | Pilgrim | Yes | Yes | No |
| 2010 | Paris Connections | Yes | No | No |

Assistant director

- Six Reels of Film to Be Shown in Any Order (1971)

Second unit director

- The Empire Strikes Back (1980)

=== Television ===
TV series

| Year | Title | Notes |
|---|---|---|
| 1994–1995 | Hercules: The Legendary Journeys | 3 episodes |
| 1995 | Xena: Warrior Princess | 1 episode |
| 1997 | The New Adventures of Robin Hood | 3 episodes |
| 1999 | CI5: The New Professionals | 2 episodes |
| 2000 | Dark Knight | 2 episodes, also writer |
| 2001 | The Immortal | 2 episodes |

TV movies

- Crash! (1971) (short film)
- The Ruby Ring (1997)
- An Angel for May (2002)
