= Empire of Ash =

1988 film by Lloyd A. Simandl and Michael Mazo

- Directed by: Michael Mazo; Lloyd A. Simandl
- Written by: Lloyd A. Simandl; Saul Urbonas
- Story by: Lloyd A. Simandl
- Produced by: John A. Curtis; Michael Mazo; Lloyd A. Simandl
- Starring: Melanie Kilgour; Thom Schioler; Frank Wilson; Sandy Mackenzie; James Stevens; Michele Chiponski
- Cinematography: Nathaniel Massey
- Edited by: Michael Mazo
- Music by: Tom Lavin; Bill Buckingham
- Production company: North American Pictures
- Distributed by: North American Releasing
- Release date: January 5, 1990 (Canada)
- Running time: 96 minutes
- Language: English
- Budget: CAD$400,000

Empire of Ash is a 1988 Canadian post-apocalyptic science fiction film directed by Lloyd A. Simandl and Michael Mazo, and starring Melanie Kilgour, Thom Schioler and Frank Wilson. In some markets, the film was released as Empire of Ash II. In the U.S., it was released as Maniac Warriors.

== Plot ==
In 2050, sometime after a nuclear war, Danielle searches for her missing sister in New Idaho. All cities have been destroyed and humanity lives in small groups scattered through the countryside. The Warriors, a government-sanctioned paramilitary group led by an insane man, have kidnapped the healthy sister in an attempt to harvest her healthy blood. Danielle meets a man named Orion, who joins her in her quest.

== Cast ==
- Melanie Kilgour as Danielle
- Thom Schioler as Orion
- Frank Wilson as Shepherd
- James Stevens as Iodine
- Alexander MacKenzie as Chuck
- Michele Chiponski as Baalca
- Ann Louise Meyer
- Eric Horsfall as Grandpa
- Michael Bernardo as Head Raider
- David Gregg as Rocket Man
- Richard Candy as Savage Gunner
- Nic Amoroso as Main Unit Raider

== Production ==
Principal photography took place around September 1987 in British Columbia, Canada, the home province of Lloyd A. Simandl's North American Pictures. The forests surrounding Squamish stood in for Idaho. The antagonists' main vehicle, the "Battle Wagon", was a customized snowplow truck that was brought in from Whistler. Stuntman Blaine Lamoureux suffered an eye injury from a prop gun fired by Melanie Kilgour, and later sued both the actress and production company for damages. Like other early North American projects, it was photographed in 16 mm. The film was scheduled for completion in January 1988. The announced budget was CAD$400,000 (about US$300,000 at the time).

== Release ==
=== Pre-release ===
Although North American Pictures' sister outfit North American Releasing was in charge of sales, the movie was represented by Alexander Beck Enterprises at the 1988 American Film Market. By that time, it had been renamed Empire of Ash II in an apparent effort to drum up additional business. By early 1989, its sequel was in the can but the film had not yet found a U.S. distributor.

=== Television ===
The film received its Canadian premiere on premium cable channel First Choice on January 5, 1990, as Empire of Ash II.

=== Home media ===
In the U.S., the film was belatedly released on May 6, 1992, by A.I.P. Home Video, who renamed it again to Maniac Warriors. In Australia, the film was released in the first week of July 1988, and the tape from Macro Entertainment retained the Empire of Ash title. In the U.K., the tape from Mogul Communications also went by Empire of Ash. The BBFC lists a certification date of September 6, 1989. However, contemporary press suggests that it actually hit the market nearly one year prior. By September 1989, the film had made back more than twice its budget.

== Reception ==
Empire of Ash has received largely negative reviews. In his syndicated Video Scene column, British critic John Brooker commented that [o]bviously all the money went on the flashes and bangs because little could have been spent on the script and acting lessons for the cast." He called it "passable for die-hard action fans, but even they will find it hard to it through to the end" British publication Elliot's Guide to Home Entertainment derided "[a] low-budget Mad Max clone of inane dialogue, minimal plotting and mindless action." Psychotronic Video acknowledged a few creative touches, like "an OK rock score" and the inclusion of "fun bits from the past" into the film's futuristic setting. The Blockbuster Entertainment Guide to Movies and Videos disagreed, calling it "pretty weird stuff."

== Sequel ==
The film received a sequel the following year, Empire of Ash III.
