= Crackerjack 2 =

1997 film directed by Robert Lee

- Original key art
- Directed by: Robert Lee
- Screenplay by: Chris Hyde
- Produced by: Dan Howard; Deborah Thompson Duda
- Starring: Judge Reinhold; Carol Alt; Michael Sarrazin; Kateřina Brožová; Karel Roden
- Cinematography: Trevor J. Brown; John Herzog
- Edited by: Richard Benwick
- Music by: Peter Allen
- Distributed by: Paramount Home Video
- Release dates: September 26, 1996 (Czech Republic); October 1997 (Canada); November 11, 1997 (U.S.)
- Running time: 96 minutes
- Countries: Canada; Czech Republic
- Language: English

Crackerjack 2, known as Hostage Train in most international markets, is a 1997 Czech–Canadian action film directed by Robert Lee, starring Judge Reinhold, Carol Alt, Michael Sarrazin and Kateřina Brožová. It is a loose sequel to the 1994 film Crackerjack. Reinhold plays a damaged widower cop trying to save train passengers—among them his new girlfriend (Alt)—trapped inside a tunnel by a group of international terrorists, which includes his wife's killer (Roden) and a mysterious overlord (Sarrazin).

== Plot ==
Eight years ago, police officer Jack Wild lost his wife to a car bombing that was meant for him. Following a shootout with a gang of terrorists, Jack Wild finds little cooperation from Interpol officer, as he carries a reputation for hotheadedness following the death of his wife. After being attacked at his home, Wild discovers that the gang's next target is a train called the Rocky Mountain Express, aboard which his new girlfriend Dana works as a hostess for VIP passengers. He commandeers a helicopter and manages to drop atop the carriage, but as it enters a tunnel, a detonation is triggered, causing the entrance to collapse and the passengers to be trapped inside. They are taken hostage by Roden and his new partner, known only as Mr. Smith.

== Cast ==
- Judge Reinhold as Jack Wild
- Carol Alt as Dana Townsend
- Michael Sarrazin as Smith
- Kateřina Brožová as Jasmine
- Robert Russel as Krill
- Terry Barclay as Parminter
- Sean Fuller as Tasker
- Richard Toth as Morey
- Steven Fisher as Prine
- Gregory Linington as Scott
- Josef Krikava as Randy
- David Nykl as Cavanaugh

== Production ==
The film was pre-produced under the title Crackerjack 2, but it was formally re-announced in North America as Hostage Train around the time of filming. While re-using part of an expository flashback from the original film, the main character's backstory has been partially retconed to tie it to this film's secondary antagonist. Filming began in late April 1996 and extended into the month of June. Contrary to the original, which was shot in Burnaby, British Columbia, in partnership with an established visual effects company, the new film was primarily shot in the Czech Republic, using North American Pictures' recently opened studios in Milín and an in-house effects team, as producing this type of picture in Canada without subsidies had become too expensive. Some additional photography did take place in British Columbia, which North American delegated to Legacy Filmworks, a local production services outfit. The train seen in the exterior shots is a BC Rail carriage.

== Release ==
=== Pre-release ===
The film was then shown at American Film Market in Santa Monica, California, which took place from February 27 to March 6, 1997.

=== Home media ===
In Canada, the film's video was released by Alliance Video under the title Hostage Train. It premiered on English-language VHS in the second week of October 1997, while the French version arrived in the second week of March 1998. In the U.S., the tape was released on November 11, 1997 by Paramount Home Video, also as Hostage Train. Paramount had absorbed the intended distributor Republic Pictures, whose name still appears in the credits.

=== Theatrical ===
The film received a limited theatrical release as Hostage Train in Canada, which actually came after its video street date. The film received a few screenings in metro Toronto starting on April 3, 1998, and in metro Vancouver starting on June 12, 1998. In the Czech Republic, it is listed with an earlier release date of September 26, 1996. It is unknown whether this alludes to a theatrical or small screen premiere.

== Reception ==
Hostage Train has received overwhelmingly negative reviews. Alan Levine of The Arizona Republic found that the film offered no redeeming qualities, while suffering from "corny dialogue" and a "dumb plot". Ballantine Books' Video Movie Guide was unimpressed by Judge Reinhold's turn as an action star, and summed up the film as "much ado about nothing". Canadian media watchdog Médiafilm judged that it suffered from a "simplistic screenplay", as well as "rudimentary direction" and "banal performances". Kinobox, a Czech website spun off from a popular TV program, delivered a rare positive opinion of the picture, finding that it offered an "exciting narrative replete with fights and chases". However, a profile of actor Karel Roden on the same site later called it "an obvious knockoff of Under Siege 2: Dark Territory" which "belong[ed] among the lowest-rated movies of all time".
