= Michael Mazo =

Canadian film director

Michael Mazo is a film director, writer and producer whose works are mainly in the action, horror and science fiction genres, but whose work also includes a documentary about ice hockey.

Mazo co-wrote and directed the 1993 science fiction film Time Runner which starred Mark Hamill as a person from the future who escapes an alien attack by going into a wormhole and back in time. The Toronto Star panned the film ("Trashy flick is lost in space") stating, "[o]nly 10 minutes into the story, Time Runner falls apart" and that Mazo "has a great fondness for close-ups of military footwear ".

Mazo's work also includes the 1994 action film Crackerjack (director), the horror film Possession (director), and the science fiction films Empire of Ash (co-writer, director and producer) and Empire of Ash III (director and producer).

The CBC called his documentary, Lottery on Ice, "a surprisingly intimate exploration of a fourteen-year old boy and his parents, risking everything-even the family itself-all for the dream of playing in the NHL."
