= Crackerjack (1994 film) =

- Directed by: Michael Mazo
- Screenplay by: Micheal Bafaro; Jonas Quastel
- Produced by: Lloyd A. Simandl; Alex Wolfe
- Starring: Thomas Ian Griffith; Nastassja Kinski; Christopher Plummer
- Cinematography: Danny Nowak
- Edited by: Richard Benwick
- Music by: Peter Allen
- Distributed by: Republic Pictures; MDP Worldwide
- Release dates: August 18, 1994 (United States); February 3, 1995 (Canada)
- Running time: 96 minutes
- Countries: Canada; United States
- Language: English
- Budget: CAD$4 million

Crackerjack is a 1994 Canadian-American action film directed by Michael Mazo, and starring Thomas Ian Griffith, Nastassja Kinski and Christopher Plummer. The setting is the Rocky Mountains. In the film, a troubled widowed cop (Griffith) and a tour guide (Kinski) attempt to prevent a high-stakes robber (Plummer) from burying the mountain hotel hosting a wealthy mobster—whom both cop and robber are after—in an avalanche. The film was part of a wave of 1990s Die Hard imitators, and is often regarded as one of the better-made independent efforts in that subgenre.

The film features a plot typical for terrorism-related films, with a terrorist group taking over a mountain resort, planning to destroy it in an intentional avalanche and to eliminate the other residents.

== Plot ==
Jack Wild is a Chicago police officer dealing with post-traumatic stress disorder after the murder of his wife and two children during an investigation into organized crime. Nicknamed "Crackerjack" by his colleagues due to his reckless behavior, Jack is forced into a family vacation with his older brother, Michael, and sister-in-law, Annie, at an isolated Rocky Mountains resort. Meanwhile, a kidnapped ice scientist named Oliver Green has been forced to plant bombs in the surrounding glacier in a mysterious plot organized by the terrorist Ivan Getz.

Arriving at the resort via cable car, Jack meets the activities coordinator, KC, whom he dances with that evening at dinner. While dancing, however, Jack recognizes the mob boss he was investigating when his family was murdered and, after causing a scene, leaves in a huff. At that moment, the terrorists take control of the resort and attempt to coerce the mob boss to hand over his cache of diamonds, but he refuses and subsequently dies without revealing their location. Meanwhile, Jack has become a thorn in Getz's side as he slowly picks off his men and searches for the diamonds himself to use as a bargaining chip. Jack signals to a nearby military base for help, but Getz shoots down the rescue helicopter and sets up a bomb to destroy any rescue via cable car. While trying to warn a group of soldiers attempting a cable car rescue, Jack is shot (as the soldiers believe he is a terrorist) and the cable car explodes, eliminating all hope of an immediate rescue.

An injured Jack, realizing that Getz is the man who murdered his family, limps to the resort first aid station and discovers Oliver Green, who is hiding from the terrorists. Green reveals the imminent destruction of the hotel by avalanche to conceal the terrorists' theft of the diamonds and prevent retaliation from the mob. During this conversation, Jack realizes that the diamonds are hidden in the ice in the mob boss’ hotel room. When Jack arrives at the suite, Getz discovers him and the diamonds, which he takes. As Getz explains, the diamonds are to be used to pay for and train a small army to take over the world and to rule it as the leader of a superior race.

Getz then shoots Michael (who survives thanks to a hip flask in his jacket, which he took from Jack earlier in the film) and attempts to escape via helicopter. Jack destroys the helicopter, and, along with all of the hotel guests, escapes to a nearby cave just as the glacier explodes, destroying the hotel and killing Getz. KC, now out of a job, promises to visit Jack in Chicago.

== Cast ==
- Thomas Ian Griffith as Jack Wild
- Nastassja Kinski as K.C.
- Christopher Plummer as Ivan Getz
- Lisa Bunting as Annie Wild
- Richard Sali as Michael Wild
- George Touliatos as Sonny La Rosso
- Frank Cassini as Mario Bracco
- William S. Taylor as Maury
- Frank C. Turner as Oliver Green
- Vladimir Kulich as Stephan

== Production ==
=== Development ===
Crackerjack was the first produced script, and second overall, from the team of Jonas Quastel and Micheal Bafaro, who had worked in the B.C. film industry in various behind-the-scenes capacities before forming a writing teams four years prior. The finished product stuck close to what the pair had originally envisioned. The film was financed through pre-sales and private investments, without assistance from government subsidies. Distributor Worldvision Enterprises, a division of Spelling Entertainment, was a major backer and North American Pictures consulted with them on the main cast. It was the first time North American worked with a fully unionized cast and crew. According to a North American executive, the film's nude scene was a contractual requirement added by WorldVision subsidiary Republic Pictures. The budget was estimated at CAD$3.7 million during production and 4 million just before release, with about CAD$375,000 allocated to the visual effects.

=== Filming ===
Filming began on September 13, 1993, and wrapped up on November 3, apparently delayed from an earlier October 25 date. While loosely inspired by Banff, Alberta, the film's Panorama Springs Resort did not exist and was represented in wide shots by a model, which agglomerated the individual sections visible throughout the film. Although some actual landscapes were captured on Grouse Mountain, much of the resort's human-scale architecture was built inside a warehouse in Burnaby. It was the last film shot in British Columbia by North American Pictures, before production costs drove it to move much of its operations to founder Lloyd Simandl's native Czech Republic.

=== Visual effects ===
The film's visual effects were supervised by Angus Bickerton for British contractor The Magic Camera. Bickerton was present in Canada to make a shot list, but the building and filming of the models took place in London, England. A team of 20 to 25 builders worked on the film's miniatures. Some of them were inserted via split screen to add depth to the original scenes, such as the rooftop fight, which was filmed on a set. Filming of the exploding miniatures was done at 100 frames per second to give the physics more realism. A remote-controlled helicopter model was used for the crash scene, and inserted into the footage of Plummer's stunt double via blue screen. It was The Magic Camera's first experience with digital compositing.

== Release ==
=== Pre-release ===
Crackerjack had its world premiere at the American Film Market on February 25, 1994.

=== Television ===
In the U.S., the film premiered on premium cable channel HBO on August 18, 1994.

=== Theatrical ===
The film received a theatrical release from Cineplex Odeon Films in Canada, the first North American Pictures release to open on the big screen in its home country. Shown in a touring release, it opened in Toronto and Montreal on February 3, 1995, in Vancouver on February 10 and in Ottawa on June 23. The film also opened theatrically in some international markets, such as the Philippines, where Solar Films released it as Agent of Destruction on July 29, 1994.

=== Home video ===
The film was released on Canadian VHS by Cineplex Odeon Video on March 7, 1995. In the U.S., the film was released on by Spelling's Republic Pictures Home Video on March 21.

== Reception ==
Crackerjack has received mixed reviews. Writing in The Province and SouthamStar newspapers, Lee Bacchus mocked the film's tropish nature, and presented his review in the form of a quiz about genre stereotypes which, if answered correctly, meant that "you're indeed film-wise and have absolutely no reason to see Crackerjack". Kim Newman of Empire called the film a "Die Hard rip-off" where Griffith displays "formula heroism" while "[s]niggering baddie Christopher Plummer and disposable love interest Nastassja Kinski do little to spruce up a strictly no-frills effort." British reference book Elliot's Guide to Home Entertainment deemed it "[a] by-the-numbers, big-scale actioner in the Die Hard mould, with ample violence to disguise both bad acting and holes in the plot."

TV Guide commented that "[a]ction fans not burned out on the familiar Die Hard formula will judge this variation at a mountain lodge passable. Others will just want to pass." It further remarked that "it's no less entertaining than many other action flicks that have been copying the formula. Under Michael Mazo's direction, this carbon copy is well paced, with some good visuals and action sequences, but bland Griffith, and Plummer's comical imitation of Alan Rickman will never get this confused with the real McCoy". Ballantine Books' Video Movie Guide awarded the film three stars, although it noted that it "would have been even better if star Thomas Ian Griffith were a better actor."

== Sequels ==
The film spawned two sequels: Crackerjack 2 (released in the U.S. and Canada as Hostage Train) with Judge Reinhold taking over the role of Jack Wild, and Crackerjack 3, which does not connect to the first two and focuses on Jack Thorn (played by Bo Svenson).
