= Jefferson Lewis =

Canadian screenwriter and film producer

Howard Jefferson Lewis (born 1951) is a Canadian screenwriter and film producer from Montreal, Quebec. He is most noted as the writer of the film Ordinary Magic, for which he was a Genie Award nominee for Best Adapted Screenplay at the 15th Genie Awards in 1994.

== Background ==
Born and raised in Montreal, he is the grandson of Wilder Penfield. After graduating from Queen's University with a degree in film studies, he worked as a journalist for the Ottawa Citizen, CBC Radio and Southam News before publishing Something Hidden, a biography of his grandfather, in 1981.

== Film career ==
His book was also adapted into a National Film Board of Canada documentary by filmmaker Bob Lower, which drew Lewis more directly into filmmaking. He wrote a number of documentary shorts for the NFB in the 1980s, and was a writer for the short-lived television soap opera Mount Royal, before making his feature film debut with the screenplay for The Paper Wedding (Les noces de papier) in 1989.

His second screenplay, Ordinary Magic, was directed by Giles Walker and released in 1993. The following year, Michel Brault released My Friend Max (Mon amie Max), from a script cowritten by Lewis and Guy Fournier. For that film, he won the award for Best Screenplay at the 1994 Rendez-vous du cinéma québécois.

In 2002 he wrote Paule Baillargeon's NFB documentary Claude Jutra: An Unfinished Story (Claude Jutra, portrait sur film), for which he won both the Gemini Award for Best Writing in a Documentary Program or Series at the 18th Gemini Awards, and the Writers Guild of Canada award for best writing in a documentary.

His later screenplays included the feature films Emotional Arithmetic and French Immersion, and the documentary film Outbreak: Anatomy of a Plague.

== Personal life ==
He was married in the 1970s to Catherine Keachie, a marketer in the publishing industry. After that marriage ended in the mid-1980s, he remarried to actress Andrée Pelletier.

== Filmography ==
- The Paper Wedding (Les noces de papier) - 1989
- Ordinary Magic - 1993
- My Friend Max (Mon amie Max) - 1994
- Creatures of the Sun - 1997
- Claude Jutra: An Unfinished Story (Claude Jutra, portrait sur film) - 2002
- Emotional Arithmetic - 2007
- Outbreak: Anatomy of a Plague - 2010
- French Immersion - 2011
