= Johanne Seymour =

Canadian crime fiction writer

Johanne Seymour is a Canadian writer from Quebec specializing in contemporary crime fiction. She is recognized for her complex plots and characters, who are often drawn from cultural minorities or confronted with extreme situations.

== Career ==
Seymour is notably the author of a series featuring Sergeant Rinzen Gyatso, a second-generation Tibetan immigrant with the SPVM, who investigates alongside Luc Paradis, a gay police officer with self-destructive tendencies. The series explores exile, integration, and social themes while blending suspense with character psychology.

Her novel Fracture (2024) addresses the sexual abuse of minors, following three adult men who were victims of their baseball coach, and explores guilt, depression, and addiction.

In 2025, Seymour wrote Fatal, a psychological thriller featuring Camille Ladouceur, a young woman whose traumatic past with a narcissistic abuser resurfaces after an unexpected encounter in a bar.

== Recognition ==
Seymour organizes the Les Printemps meurtriers festival in Knowlton, in the Eastern Townships, dedicated to promoting Quebec crime fiction.

== Bibliography ==
=== Literary adaptation of a Quebec television series ===
- Alertes: La face cachée du meurtre de Marilou Magloire (in French). Libre Expression. 2026. p. 304. ISBN 9782764817469. (Published in Quebec on March 23, 2026; scheduled for release in France on June 1, 2026.)

== See also ==
- Chrystine Brouillet
- Kathy Reichs
- Crime fiction
