= Dead Ahead: The Exxon Valdez Disaster =

1992 television film by Paul Seed

- Genre: Drama
- Written by: Michael Baker
- Directed by: Paul Seed
- Starring: Christopher Lloyd; John Heard; Rip Torn; Bob Gunton; Michael Murphy; Mark Metcalf
- Music by: David Ferguson
- Country of origin: United States
- Original language: English

Production
- Executive producers: Richard Broke; Colin Callender; Leslie Woodhead
- Producers: John Smithson; David M. Thompson
- Production locations: Alaska; Vancouver
- Cinematography: Ian Punter
- Editor: Dave King
- Running time: 90 minutes
- Production companies: HBO Showcase; BBC Films

Original release
- Network: HBO
- Release: December 12, 1992

Dead Ahead: The Exxon Valdez Disaster is a 1992 television movie depicting the Exxon Valdez oil spill disaster off the coast of Alaska. Directed by Paul Seed, it stars Christopher Lloyd, John Heard, Rip Torn and Michael Murphy.

Most of the film was shot in Vancouver, Richmond and Steveston, British Columbia, but it also utilizes archival film clips of the actual disaster and cleanup efforts.

== Synopsis ==
On March 24, 1989, the Exxon Valdez oil tanker struck a reef in Prince William Sound, Alaska. It was the worst oil spill of its time, releasing over 11 million US gallons (260,000 bbl; 42,000 m^{3}) of crude oil onto the Alaskan shoreline.

Much of the film centers on the conflict between local officials, the fishing industry, and the Exxon official sent out to oversee the clean-up and take the rap. The filmmakers point out that much of the aftermath could have been minimized had the officials in charge been better prepared and not spent so much time involved in useless red-tape and petty bureaucratic bickering.

== Cast ==
- John Heard as Dan Lawn, State of Alaska
- Bob Gunton as Larry Dietrick, State of Alaska
- Mark Metcalf as Dennis Kelso, State of Alaska
- Bruce Gray as Governor Steve Cowper, State of Alaska
- Jo Bates as Michelle Brown, State of Alaska
- Walter Marsh as John Janssen, State of Alaska
- John Maclaren as Al Kegler, State of Alaska
- Marek Czuma as Jim Hayden, State of Alaska
- Susan Astley as Jan Jackson, State of Alaska
- Lochlyn Munro as Trooper Mike Fox, State of Alaska
- Wally Dalton as Senator, State of Alaska
- Frank C. Turner as Biologist, State of Alaska
- Christopher Lloyd as Frank Iarossi, Exxon
- Ron Frazier as Don Cornett, Exxon
- Remak Ramsay as Craig Rassinier, Exxon
- Malcolm Stewart as Dr. Gordon Lindblom, Exxon
- Richard Sargent as Ulysses Legrange, Exxon
- Tom McBeath as Bill Deppe, Exxon (credited as Tom Mcbeath)
- Forbes Angus as Paul Myers, Exxon
- Patricia Dahlquist as Millie Iarossi, Exxon
- Don S. Davis as Bill Stevens, Exxon
- Paul Guilfoyle as Commander Steve McCall, US Coast Guard
- Gary Reineke as Rear Admiral Nelson, US Coast Guard
- Eric Keenleyside as Gordon Taylor, US Coast Guard
- Andrew Wheeler as Bruce Blanford, US Coast Guard
- Michael Patten as Tom Falkenstein, US Coast Guard
- J.B. Bivens as Mark Delozier, US Coast Guard
- Rip Torn as Admiral Paul Yost, Presidential Delegation
- Michael Murphy as U.S. EPA Administrator William K. Reilly, Presidential Delegation
- Kenneth Welsh as Sam Skinner, Presidential Delegation
- Peter Yunker as John Gaughan, Presidential Delegation
- Myron Natwick as George M. Nelson, Alyeska
- Alex Bruhanski as Chuck O'Donnell, Alyeska
- Bill Dow as Larry Shier, Alyeska
- Ken Camroux-Taylor as Dave Barnum, Alyeska (credited as Ken Camroux)
- Leslie Carlson as Theo Polasek, Alyeska
- Jackson Davies as Captain Hazelwood, Tanker Exxon Valdez
- Philip Granger as 3rd Mate Greg Cousins, Tanker Exxon Valdez
- Peter LaCroix as Helmsman Claar, Tanker Exxon Valdez (credited as Peter Lacroix)
- Peg Christopherson as A.B. Maureen Jones, Tanker Exxon Valdez
- Nathan Vanering as Helmsman Kagan, Tanker Exxon Valdez
- Anthony Ulc as 1st Mate Kunkel, Tanker Exxon Valdez
- Dwight McFee as Crewman, Tanker Exxon Valdez (credited as Dwight Mcfee)
- David Morse as Rick Steiner, Fisherman
- Timothy Webber as Jack Lamb, Fisherman
- Tamsin Kelsey as Dr. Riki Ott, Fisherman
- Michael Rogers as David Grimes, Fisherman (credited as Michael J. Rogers)
- Danny Virtue as Baker, Fisherman
- Mark Brandon as The Narrator (voice)

== Production and release ==
Dead Ahead is based on the Exxon Valdez oil spill that occurred on March 24, 1989 where an oil tanker spilled nearly 11 million gallons of crude oil off the coast of Alaska. The film was written by Michael Baker. Baker spent more than a year going through official reports and transcripts for research before writing the first draft.

== Reception ==
Howard Rosenberg from the Los Angeles Times called the film a "compelling thriller about self-interest taking precedence over public interest", praising Paul Seed's directing and the performances by John Heard and Christopher Lloyd.
