= Jericho Mansions =

- Film poster
- Directed by: Alberto Sciamma
- Written by: Harriet Sand; Alberto Sciamma
- Produced by: Michael Lionello Cowan; Jean-Marc Félio; Jason Piette
- Starring: James Caan; Geneviève Bujold; Jennifer Tilly
- Cinematography: Alastair Meux
- Edited by: Yves Langlois
- Music by: Dan Jones
- Distributed by: Multicom Entertainment Group
- Release date: 2003
- Running time: 98 min
- Countries: Canada; United Kingdom
- Language: English

Jericho Mansions is a 2003 independent mystery thriller film directed by Alberto Sciamma. It stars Jennifer Tilly, James Caan, Geneviève Bujold, and Maribel Verdú. It was filmed in Saint John, New Brunswick and in Almería, Spain.

== Plot ==
Leonard Grey is a reclusive and agoraphobic superintendent who has spent thirty years managing Jericho Mansions, a decaying apartment complex. His isolated existence is defined by his dedication to the building's maintenance and his avoidance of the outside world.

However, Leonard's quiet life is upended when a series of bizarre occurrences and a murder investigation cast suspicion on him. As the police delve into the building's history, a long-buried secret from the past begins to resurface. To prove his innocence, Leonard must navigate the labyrinthine corridors of the complex and confront his own fractured memory, all while dealing with a cast of eccentric and potentially dangerous tenants who each seem to be hiding secrets of their own.

== Cast ==
- James Caan as Leonard Grey
  - Martin Thibaudeau as Young Leonard Grey
- Genevieve Bujold as Lily Melnick
  - Johanne McKay as Young Lily
- Jennifer Tilly as Donna Cherry
- Maribel Verdu as Dolores O'Donnell
- Peter Keleghan as Bill Cherry
- Pierre Rioux as Robert Melnick
  - Charles Edwin Powell as Young Robert Melnick (credited as Charles Powell)
- Bruce Ramsay as Eugene O'Donnell
- Susan Glover as Valda
- Mark Camacho as Gilbert
- Victoria Jane Allen as Holly
- Joe Cobden as Vikes
- David Gow as Slasey
- John Bourgeois as Detective Carp
- David Attis as "Big Belly"
- Conrad Pla as Cordero
- Lenie Scoffie as Bettina
- Roseanne Maloney as Female Singer
- Paul Vega as Indian On Horseback
- Antonio Wilford as The Director
