= Marypat Farrell =

American actress and musician

- Occupation: Television actress

Marypat Farrell is an American actress and musician best known for her role on The Gavin Crawford Show.

== Early life ==
Farrell is an alumna of The Second City's Toronto company.

== Career ==
She plays Kitty Robinson on the video podcast Goodnight Burbank and had guest roles in television series including Ben and Kate, Criminal Minds, 90210, Conan, Suburgatory, Gavin Crawford's Wild West, Curb Your Enthusiasm and Anger Management.

In 2003, Farrell and Gavin Crawford were nominated for a Canadian Comedy Award in the TV category for their work on The Gavin Crawford Show.

== Filmography ==
=== Film ===
Year	Title	Role	Notes
2003	Once Brothers	Alice	
2014	The Occupants	Mara	
2016	Codex	Professor Brandt	
2018	Beautiful Boy	Julia's Mother	
2018	Soundwave	Shayna's Mom	
2020	The 11th Green	Kat	

=== Television ===
Year	Title	Role	Notes
2000	The Zack Files	Alien 1	Episode: "Sockworld"
2000–2003	The Gavin Crawford Show	Various roles	30 episodes
2001	Jewel	PE Teacher	Television film
2004	Crossballs: The Debate Show	PSA Mother	Episode: "Drugs"
2005	Still Standing	Wendy	Episode: "Still Holding"
2005	Comedy Central Thanxgiveaway: Holiday Parade from Hell, MN	Mom	Television film
2006	Weeds	Stage Mother Rhonda	Episode: "Mrs. Botwin's Neighborhood"
2006	Comedy Central Thanksgiving Wiikend: Thanksgiving Island	Mrs. Woods	Television film
2006	Goodnight Burbank	Kitty Robinson	Television short
2007	Comedy Central Thanxgiveaway Wiikend: 'Ving Break	Motel Clerk	Television film
2008	Bury the Hatchet	Hailey Hatchet	Television film
2008–2016	Jimmy Kimmel Live!	Various roles	3 episodes
2009	Curb Your Enthusiasm	Mrs. Duberstein	Episode: "The Table Read"
2009	The Tonight Show with Conan O'Brien	Porn Blocker Mom	Episode: "Eva Mendes/Bon Jovi"
2010–2022	Conan	Various roles	6 episodes
2011	90210	Mrs. Mangold	Episode: "Blue Naomi"
2011	Big Time Rush	Last Mom	Episode: "Big Time Girl Group"
2012	Criminal Minds	Hilary Ross	Episode: "A Thin Line"
2012	Ben and Kate	Mom #1	Episode: "Career Day"
2013	Suburgatory	Claire	Episode: "Junior Secretary's Day"
2013	Anger Management	Couple Woman #2	Episode: "Charlie and Kate Start a Sex Study"
2013	Gavin Crawford's Wild West	Trevor's Mom	Television film
2013	Hello Ladies	Woman #3	Episode: "Pilot"
2014	Review	The Mighty Regis	Episode: "Quitting; Last Day; Irish"
2014	Nicky, Ricky, Dicky & Dawn	Mrs. Rothschild	Episode: "Scaredy Dance"
2015	State of Affairs	Producer	Episode: "The Faithful"
2015	The Middle	Mom	Episode: "Operation Infiltration"
2015	Starland P.C.	Donna	Episode: "It's the Same Thing, Rabbi"
2015	Jane the Virgin	Nurse	Episode: "Chapter Twenty-Two"
2016	Workaholics	Melanie	Episode: "Wolves of Rancho"
2016	Crazy Ex-Girlfriend	Judge	Episode: "Josh and I Go to Los Angeles!"
2016	The Mindy Project	Linda	Episode: "Bernardo & Anita"
2016	Lopez	Nora	Episode: "George Goes All In"
2016	I am: Life of a Gigolo	Dr. Suadela	Episode: "A Doctor's Touch"
2017	Bridal Boot Camp	Mother of Bride-to-Be	Television film
2017	Hyperlinked	Mrs. Meyers	Episode: "No Easy Fix"
2017	Get Shorty	Susan	Episode: "Turnaround"
2017	The Comedy Get Down	MC	Episode: "No Good Weed"
2017	Life in Pieces	Renegade	Episode: "Treasure Ride Poker Hearing"
2017	ctrl alt delete	Philippa	Episode: "Philippa"
2018	It's Always Sunny in Philadelphia	Kate	Episode: "Time's Up for the Gang"
2018	Baroness von Sketch Show	Art Show Guest	2 episodes
2018	Lethal Weapon	Brenda	Episode: "Bad Santas"
2021	On the Verge	Margaret	Episode: "What Comes Next"
2021	9-1-1	Dr. Rosalie Nathanson	3 episodes
2023	Night Court	Helen	Episode: "Dan v. Dating"
