= The Gavin Crawford Show =

Canadian sketch comedy series

- Created by: Gavin Crawford
- Starring: Gavin Crawford; Tracy Dawson; Marypat Farrell; Cathy Gordon-Marsh; Jennifer Irwin; Griffin Malcolm; Doug Morency; Christen Nelson; Panou
- Country of origin: Canada
- No. of episodes: 26

Production
- Running time: 30 min

Original release
- Network: The Comedy Network
- Release: June 19, 2000 – July 1, 2003

The Gavin Crawford Show is a Canadian sketch comedy series, which aired from June 19, 2000, to July 1, 2003, on The Comedy Network. Following the first season in 2000, production on The Gavin Crawford Show was temporarily interrupted by Crawford's participation in the short-lived American sketch comedy series Hype, but resumed when Crawford returned to Canada after Hype's cancellation, having two further seasons and producing 26 episodes altogether.

The show starred comedian Gavin Crawford, along with an ensemble cast of supporting performers including Tracy Dawson, Marypat Farrell, Cathy Gordon-Marsh, Jennifer Irwin, Griffin Malcolm, Doug Morency, Christen Nelson, Lisa Brooke and Panou. Many of its cast members had previously worked together as part of The Second City's Toronto cast in 1998.

In addition to Crawford, the show's writers included Kyle Tingley, Jennifer Whalen, Cathy Gordon and Alex Pugsley. Ron Murphy was the director.

Characters included Ron and Ocean Breeze, a New Age folk music duo who expressed their marital disputes in song; Red Ronnie Rocker, an aspiring rock star; Hugey McBalls, a porn star and author of the self-help book Acting for the Adult Camera; nerdy teenager Mark Jackson; and male feminist motivational speaker Len Henderson.

Following its run, Crawford and his character Mark Jackson moved on to This Hour Has 22 Minutes in 2003. Crawford subsequently also developed Gavin Crawford's Wild West for CBC Television, although the series was not picked up and only its pilot aired as a one-off comedy special.
