= Ordinary Magic =

1993 Canadian drama film starring Ryan Reynolds

- Directed by: Giles Walker
- Written by: Jefferson Lewis
- Based on: Ganesh by Malcolm Bosse
- Produced by: Paul Stephens
- Starring: Glenne Headly; David Fox; Heath Lamberts; Paul Anka; Ryan Reynolds
- Cinematography: Paul Sarossy
- Edited by: Ralph Brunjes
- Music by: Mychael Danna
- Distributed by: Cineplex Odeon Films
- Release date: October 21, 1993 (Canada)
- Running time: 103 minutes
- Country: Canada
- Language: English

Ordinary Magic is a 1993 Canadian drama film directed by Giles Walker and produced by Paul Stephens. It is based on the 1981 novel Ganesh by Malcolm Bosse. The film is notable for being the feature film debut of actor Ryan Reynolds.

== Plot ==
Raised in India, fifteen-year-old Ganesh (Ryan Reynolds) moves to Paris, Ontario after his father's death. Facing culture shock, he uses Satyagraha (non-violent resistance) to help his aunt (Glenne Headly) stage a hunger strike against a land developer.

== Cast ==
The film features a mix of Canadian and international actors (alongside Sri Lankan actors for the India-set sequences):

- Ryan Reynolds as Jeffrey "Ganesh" Moore
- Glenne Headly as Charlotte Moore Strepski
- Paul Anka as Joey Dean
- David Fox as Warren Moore
- Heath Lamberts as Mayor Walton
- Denawaka Hamine as Vani
- Henry Jayasena as the Priest

== Filming locations ==
The production was filmed in two main locations:

- Canada: Scenes in the town of "Paris" were filmed on location in Paris, Ontario. The town's historic architecture and the Grand River served as the backdrop for the protest sequences.
- Sri Lanka: The India sequences were filmed in the Hikkaduwa region of Sri Lanka. (in 2023, Ryan Reynolds stated that Hikkaduwa remains his "favourite movie shooting location of all time.")

== Music ==
The film's score was composed by Mychael Danna, who utilized Indian classical instruments to reflect the protagonist's background. Danna later won an Academy Award for his work on Life of Pi, another film with significant Indian themes.

== Awards ==
- Brussels International Film Festival: Winner of the Audience Award (1994).
- Genie Awards: Nominated for Best Adapted Screenplay (Jefferson Lewis).
