= Hype (TV series) =

American sketch comedy television series

- Genre: Sketch comedy
- Created by: Scott King; Lanier Laney; Terry Sweeney
- Starring: Steve Kramer; Michael Roof; Frank Caliendo; Jennifer Elise Cox; Gavin Crawford; Daniele Gaither; Nadya Ginsburg; Christen Nelson; Shayma Tash; Chris Williams
- Country of origin: United States
- No. of seasons: 1
- No. of episodes: 17

Production
- Production companies: Tollin/Robbins Productions; Warner Bros. Television

Original release
- Network: The WB
- Release: October 8, 2000 – February 18, 2001

Hype is an American sketch comedy television series which ran for 17 episodes from October 8, 2000, to February 18, 2001, on The WB.

Created by Scott King, Lanier Laney and Terry Sweeney, the series was ordered by the WB after the trio wrote a sketch for MADtv which parodied Felicity, the network's major hit series at the time. The series focused on sketches parodying pop culture, particularly the inflation of cultural and public relations hype.

King, Laney and Sweeney were also writers for the series, along with Jordan Black, Jerry Collins, Jay Johnston, Kent Fuher, Karen Kilgariff, Lori Nasso, Andy Bobrow, David Sussin, Steve Holland, Warren Lieberstein, Robert Sherman and John Unholz.

On February 8, 2001, the series was canceled after one season, although two of its cast members, Frank Caliendo and Daniele Gaither, subsequently joined MADtv, while Gavin Crawford has had success as a television comedian in Canada, including on The Gavin Crawford Show and This Hour Has 22 Minutes.

== Cast ==
- Stephen E. Kramer
- Michael Roof
- Frank Caliendo
- Jennifer Elise Cox
- Gavin Crawford
- Daniele Gaither
- Nadya Ginsburg
- Christen Sussin
- Shayma Tash
- Chris Williams

== Episodes ==
No.	Title	Original release date	Prod. code
1	"Pilot"	October 8, 2000	226900
2	"Episode 1"	October 15, 2000	226901
3	"Episode 2"	October 22, 2000	226902
4	"Episode 3"	October 29, 2000	226903
5	"Episode 4"	November 5, 2000	226904
6	"Episode 5"	November 12, 2000	226905
7	"Episode 6"	November 19, 2000	226906
8	"Episode 7"	November 26, 2000	226907
9	"Episode 8"	December 10, 2000	226908
10	"Episode 9"	December 17, 2000	226909
11	"Episode 10"	January 7, 2001	226910
12	"Episode 11"	January 14, 2001	226911
13	"Episode 12"	January 21, 2001	226912
14	"Episode 13"	February 4, 2001	226913
15	"Episode 14"	February 11, 2001	226914
16	"Episode 15"	February 18, 2001	226915
17	"Episode 16"	February 18, 2001	226916

== Theme song ==
The theme song to the show was "Bodyrock" by Moby, which was played during the opening credits.
