= Manuel Aránguiz =

Chilean-Canadian actor

Manuel Aranguiz
- Born: October 15, 1945 (age 80); Santiago, Chile
- Occupations: actor, writer
- Years active: 1980s-present
- Notable work: The Paper Wedding, Eclipse

Manuel Aranguiz (born October 15, 1945) is a Chilean Canadian actor and writer. He is most noted for his performance in the 1989 film The Paper Wedding (Les Noces de papier), for which he won the Gémeaux Award for Best Actor in a Television Film or Miniseries in 1990.

His other most prominent role as an actor was in the 1994 film Eclipse; however, his acting career was somewhat limited by a perception that he was too "ethnic" for the Quebec film and television industries, and he generally only had small supporting or guest roles rather than major starring performances.

Some of his poetry was set to music by the Latin jazz ensemble Intakto on their albums Intakto (2002) and Todavia (2007); Intakto won the Félix Award for World Music Album of the Year at the 25th Felix Awards in 2003, and was a Juno Award nominee for World Music Album of the Year at the Juno Awards of 2004.

== Filmography ==
Year	Title	Role	Notes
1973	Little White Dove (Palomita blanca)	Lodger	
1975	There Is No Forgetting (Il n'y a pas d'oubli)	Pablo	Anthology film; segments "J'explique certaines choses" and "Steelblues (Jours de fer)"
1975	Rappelle-toi		
1976	The Flower Between the Teeth (La Fleur aux dents)		
1990	The Paper Wedding (Les Noces de papier)	Pablo Torres	
1990	Cargo	Officer	
1991	Love Crazy (Amoureux fou)	Himself	
1992	Scoop	Enrique Lopez	TV series; 10 episodes
1993	Matusalem	Le Bricoleur	
1994	A Hero's Life (La Vie d'un héros)	Vincent	
1994	Eclipse	Gabriel	
1995	La présence des ombres	Dr. Senez	
1995	La Folie des crinolines		
1996	Lulu		
1997	The Assignment	Venezeualan Oil Minister	
1997	Matusalem II (Matusalem II: le dernier des Beauchesne)	Diego Vielo	
1997	Lobby	Dr. Velez	TV series; one episode.
1998	Mr. Aiello (La Déroute)	Father Ramirez	
1998	Coup at Daybreak (Amaneció de golpe)	McCarty	
2001	Tribu.com	Doctor	
2001	Protection	Mr. Ramos	
2001	Fortier	Man In Gay Bar	TV series; one episode
2003	Levity	Señor Aguilar	
2005	Tom Clancy's Splinter Cell: Chaos Theory	Additional Character Voices	
2005	Human Trafficking	Mexican Police Captain	
2006	10.5: Apocalypse	Nando Garcia	
2007	Imitation		
2009	A Cargo to Africa (Un cargo pour l'Afrique)	King Patron	
2017	Nous Sommes le Freak Show	Pascual	
