= Sylvain Brault =

Canadian cinematographer

Sylvain Brault (born 1958) is a Canadian cinematographer from Quebec. He is most noted as a two-time Genie Award nominee for Best Cinematography, receiving nods at the 15th Genie Awards in 1994 for My Friend Max (Mon amie Max), and at the 17th Genie Awards in 1996 for Rowing Through.

He is the son of filmmaker and cinematographer Michel Brault, with whom he worked on several films early in his career; the short documentary film L'Emprise won awards at the Yorkton Film Festival in 1988 for both Michel as best director and Sylvain as best cinematographer. He directed and filmed music videos for Julie Masse and Joe Bocan in the late 1980s and early 1990s, and married Masse in 1993; Brault and Masse were divorced by 1995, when Masse remarried to Corey Hart.

== Filmography ==
- L'Emprise - 1988
- The Paper Wedding (Les noces de papier) - 1989
- My Friend Max (Mon amie Max) - 1994
- Meurtre en musique - 1994
- Circus Passion (Le Feu sacré) - 1994
- Rowing Through - 1996
- Coyote Run - 1996
- Mistaken Identity (Erreur sur la personne) - 1996
- Les Boys - 1997
- The Long Winter (Quand je serai parti... vous vivrez encore) - 1999
- 2001: A Space Travesty - 2000
- Hidden Agenda - 2001
- Jack Paradise: Montreal by Night (Jack Paradise : Les nuits de Montréal) - 2004
