= French Immersion (film) =

- Promotional film poster
- Directed by: Kevin Tierney
- Written by: Jefferson Lewis; Kevin Tierney
- Produced by: Kevin Tierney; Claude Bonin
- Starring: Oluniké Adeliyi; Dorothée Berryman; Martha Burns; Pascale Bussières; Gavin Crawford; Fred Ewanuick; Karine Vanasse; Colm Feore
- Cinematography: Nathalie Moliavko-Visotzky
- Edited by: Arthur Tarnowski
- Music by: Laurent Eyquem
- Production company: Park Ex Pictures
- Distributed by: TVA Films
- Release date: October 7, 2011
- Running time: 99 minutes
- Country: Canada
- Languages: English; French
- Budget: $6.3 million

French Immersion, subtitled It's Trudeau's Fault in English and C'est la faute à Trudeau in French, is a 2011 Canadian comedy film. The dialogue in this film is a mixture of both English and French. The film was the directorial debut of longtime film producer Kevin Tierney, best known for his work on the comedy film Bon Cop, Bad Cop. This story follows a group of Anglophones who come to a remote town in northern Quebec, in order to learn French.

In an interview with Northernstars.ca, a website dedicated to Canadian film history, Tierney mentioned a potential sequel where instead of a French immersion course, the characters would be taking an English immersion one in Regina, Saskatchewan.

== Synopsis ==
The film centres on several anglophones, mostly Canadians but including one American, who travel to the small village of Saint-Isidore-du-Cœur-de-Jésus in the Saguenay—Lac-Saint-Jean region of Quebec for an intensive French immersion course. The language students include Bobby "JFGay" Sexton (Gavin Crawford), a federal Member of Parliament who aspires to become leader of his political party but is avoiding a debate against rival candidate Michael Pontifikator (Colm Feore) because of his poor French skills; Cathy (Martha Burns), his Royal Canadian Mounted Police bodyguard; Aretha Marley (Oluniké Adeliyi), a flight attendant who has taken the immersion course twice before but still cannot speak French, having learned only how to put on a French accent while speaking English; Colin MacGonagle (Fred Ewanuick), a divorced postal worker from Alberta who enters a romance with French teacher Julie Tremblay (Karine Vanasse); and Jonathan Hornstein (Jacob Tierney), a trainee chef from New York City who wants to open a French restaurant.

In Saint-Isidore, nearly all of the 2,000 residents have the surname Tremblay—the sole exceptions are Pierre-Émile Dagnais (Yves Jacques), the strictest and most disciplinarian teacher at the French immersion school, and Kumar (Ali Hassan), a chef from Mumbai who moved to the town because he'd been told the region was where all of Quebec's Indians were. The town's most powerful residents are Sylvie Tremblay (Pascale Bussières), the head of the French immersion school, and her father (Robert Charlebois), a corrupt Senator.

== Cast ==
The casting for this film was done by Rosina Bucci.

- Gavin Crawford - Bobby Sexton
- Pascale Bussières - Sylvie Tremblay
- Colm Feore - Michael Pontifikator
- Oluniké Adeliyi - Aretha Marley
- Fred Ewanuick - Colin MacGonagle
- Karine Vanasse - Julie Tremblay
- Martha Burns - Cathy
- Jacob Tierney - Jonathan Hornstein
- Dorothée Berryman - Thérèse Tremblay
- Jean-Guy Bouchard - Euclide Tremblay 'Papa'
- Robert Charlebois - Senator Tremblay
- Yves Jacques - Pierre-Émile Dagnais

== Release ==
The film premiered in Ontario and Quebec on October 11, 2011. It was later released in Vancouver, British Columbia on October 14, and in Winnipeg, Manitoba on October 28.

=== Home media ===
French Immersion was released on DVD on January 24, 2012.

== Reception ==
=== Critical response ===
On review aggregation website Rotten Tomatoes, French Immersion has an approval rating of 40%, and an average rating of 4.8/10. One of the websites critic describes the film as "Funny in both official languages, French Immersion is the story of career-conscious English Canadians who flock to a small Quebec town to meet a Tremblay and learn French."

=== Accolades ===
On May 28, 2012, at the Big Island Film Festival, French Immersion won best feature film.

On June 8, 2012, at the Canadian Comedy Awards, French Immersion was nominated for best film, Jefferson Lewis and Kevin Tierney for best writing, Tierney for best direction, and Oluniké Adeliyi for best female performance. Gavin Crawford won for best male performance.

Steven Page's song "A Different Sort of Solitude" received a Genie Award nomination for Best Original Song at the 32nd Genie Awards in 2012.
