= Myron Natwick (actor) =

American actor (born 1927)

- Born: Myron Harvey Natwick; December 31, 1927 (age 98); Portland, Oregon, U.S.
- Education: University of Southern California
- Occupation: Actor
- Years active: 1960–2019
- Relatives: Grim Natwick (uncle); Mildred Natwick (cousin)

Myron Harvey Natwick (born December 31, 1927) is an American actor and producer whose career spanned more than six decades, with roles in films such as Three Days of the Condor (1975), Cats & Dogs (2001), and I Don’t Feel at Home in This World Anymore (2017). He is also known for his television appearances in series like iZombie and Documentary Now!.

== Life and career ==
Natwick was born in Portland, Oregon, on December 31, 1927. He comes from a family with strong ties to the arts. He is the nephew of Grim Natwick, the celebrated animator best known for creating Betty Boop and contributing to Disney's Snow White and the Seven Dwarfs. His cousin is Academy Award nominee actress Mildred Natwick, further connecting him to a lineage of creative. He appeared in theatres in Houston, Texas. He also attended the University of Southern California, earning his BS degree.

Natwick's career unfolded across more than six decades, marked by a steady presence in both film and television. He first gained recognition in the 1970s with his role in Three Days of the Condor (1975), a political thriller starring Robert Redford, where Natwick played a supporting character in the tense world of espionage. In the following decades, Natwick continued to build his résumé with diverse roles. He appeared in family comedies such as Cats & Dogs (2001). His versatility was evident again in I Don’t Feel at Home in This World Anymore (2017), a dark comedy crime film directed by Macon Blair, which won the Grand Jury Prize at Sundance.

The guest‑starred in iZombie, playing Blaine's grandfather, a role that connected him to a younger audience through the popular CW series. He appeared in Documentary Now! (2016), a satirical mockumentary series created by Fred Armisen, Bill Hader, and Seth Meyers, where his comedic timing was highlighted. Other credits include Matador (2014), Bad Samaritans (2013), Pretend Time (2011), Haven (2014), and Flashforward (2009), each showcasing his adaptability across genres ranging from drama to comedy and science fiction.

Natwick later career included roles in films such as The Wedding Year (2019), Truth or Dare (2018), Sickhouse (2016), and The Channel (2016).

== Filmography ==
- Death Valley Days (1960)
- The Forest Rangers (1964) - Bronco Smith
- The Aquarians (1970) – First Reporter
- That Certain Summer (1972) – Man at Party
- The Judge and Jake Wyler (1972) – Lyle Jefferson
- Three Days of the Condor (1975) – Civilian
- Crossbar (1979) – Smith
- Mistress of Paradise (1981) – Dr. Slocum
- The Awakening of Candra (1983) – Burrows
- The Ice Pirates (1984) – Karina's Father
- Head Office (1985) – TV Anchorman
- Days of Our Lives (1972–1988)
- Glory! Glory! (1989) – Everett
- Mission: Killfast (1991) – Nick Julius
- Project Vampire (1992) – Dr. Frederick Klaus
- Dead Ahead: The Exxon Valdez Disaster (1992) – George M. Nelson
- Dog’s Best Friend (1997) – Principal
- The Corpse Grinders 2 (2000) – McBride
- Cats & Dogs (2001) – Mr. Mason
- DC 9/11: Time of Crisis (2003) – Paul O’Neill
- Cavedweller (2004) – Granddaddy Byrd
- Shallow Ground (2005) – Harvey
- Miracle at Sage Creek (2005) – Recorder
- Amber's Story (2006) – Glen Park
- Her Sister's Keeper (2006) – Jack Brennan
- A Decent Proposal (2007) – Alex Varvinsky
- The Washingtonians (2007) – Samuel Madison III
- Ice Blues: A Donald Strachey Mystery (2008) – Brian Lenigan
- Watch Dogs (2014) – Dermot 'Lucky' Quinn
- I Don’t Feel at Home in This World Anymore (2017) – Killer Sills
- Truth or Dare (2018) – Hospital Corpse
- The Wedding Year (2019) – Gentleman
