= My Friend Max =

- French: Mon amie Max
- Directed by: Michel Brault
- Written by: Guy Fournier; Jefferson Lewis
- Produced by: Aimée Danis; Carole Ducharme; Alain Rocca
- Starring: Geneviève Bujold; Marthe Keller; Johanne McKay
- Cinematography: Sylvain Brault
- Edited by: Jacques Gagné
- Music by: François Dompierre
- Production companies: Les Productions Lazennec; Les Productions du Verseau; National Film Board of Canada
- Release date: February 18, 1994 (RVCQ)
- Running time: 106 minutes
- Country: Canada
- Language: French

My Friend Max (French: Mon amie Max) is a 1994 Canadian drama film, written by Guy Fournier and Jefferson Lewis, and directed by Michel Brault. The film premiered in February 1994 at the Rendez-vous du cinéma québécois.

The film was selected as the Canadian entry for the Best Foreign Language Film at the 67th Academy Awards, but was not accepted as a nominee.

== Plot ==
The film is set in contemporary Quebec City, Quebec.

Catherine (Marthe Keller), a concert pianist, is surprised one night by the arrival of her childhood friend Max (Geneviève Bujold), whom she hasn't seen for 25 years. Catherine and Max were students together at the Music Conservatory in Quebec City, and were the most promising pianists. While still in her teens, the adventurous Max gets pregnant. She wants to keep the child, but her domineering mother forces her to give him up for adoption. The rebellious Max then leaves Quebec and the music world. Now, years later, she returns, obsessed with finding her son. With the help of Catherine, she locates the adoption records and social workers contact her son to ask if he wants to see her. He refuses, but she keeps trying until they are reunited.

== Cast ==
- Geneviève Bujold as Marie-Alexandrine Brabant
- Marthe Keller as Catherine Mercier
- Johanne McKay as Marie-Alexandrine (adolescente)
- Marie Guillard as Catherine (adolescente)
- Michel Rivard as Denis Lajeunesse
- Rita Lafontaine as Madame Brabant
- Véronique Le Flaguais as Mme Michaud
- Jean-Louis Roux as Père Berube
- Patrice Bissonnette as Michael Simard

== Awards and nominations ==
At RVCQ, Bujold won the award for Best Performance, McKay won the award for Most Promising Actor, and Guy Fournier and Jefferson Lewis won the award for Best Screenplay.

The film was selected as the Canadian entry for the Best Foreign Language Film at the 67th Academy Awards, but was not accepted as a nominee.

It received six Genie Award nominations at the 15th Genie Awards in 1994, for Best Picture, Best Actress (Bujold), Best Supporting Actor (Rivard), Best Supporting Actress (McKay), Best Cinematography (Sylvain Brault) and Best Editing (Jacques Gagné).

Bujold won the 1993 Prix Guy-L'Écuyer for Mon amie Max.

== See also ==
- List of submissions to the 67th Academy Awards for Best Foreign Language Film
- List of Canadian submissions for the Academy Award for Best Foreign Language Film
