= Rowing Through =

- Directed by: Masato Harada
- Written by: Will Aitken; Masato Harada
- Based on: The Amateurs by David Halberstam
- Produced by: Claude Gagnon; Yuri Yoshimura-Gagnon
- Starring: Colin Ferguson; Leslie Hope; Peter Murnik; James Hyndman
- Cinematography: Sylvain Brault
- Edited by: Jean-Guy Montpetit
- Music by: Masahiro Kawasaki
- Release date: September 7, 1996
- Running time: 116 minutes
- Countries: Canada; Japan
- Language: English

Rowing Through is a Canadian-Japanese co-produced drama film, directed by Masato Harada and released in 1996. Based on David Halberstam's book The Amateurs, the film centres on American sculler Tiff Wood as he tries to qualify for the 1984 Summer Olympics.

The film stars Colin Ferguson as Wood, Leslie Hope as Kate Bordeleau, Peter Murnik as John Biglow and James Hyndman as Polar Bear Nelson, as well as Helen Shaver, Kenneth Welsh, Christopher Heyerdahl, Kris Holden-Ried and Ellen David.

The film received two Genie Award nominations at the 17th Genie Awards in 1996, for Best Supporting Actor (Hyndman) and Best Cinematography (Sylvain Brault).

== Cast ==
- Colin Ferguson as Tiff Wood
- Leslie Hope as Kate Bordeleau
  - Lisa Kalaschnick as Young Kate Bordeleau
- Peter Murnik as John Biglow
- James Hyndman as "Polar Bear" Nelson
- Michiko Hada as Taki
- Chris Jacobs as Joe Bouscaren (credited as Christopher Jacobs)
- Helen Shaver as "Slim"
- Kenneth Welsh as Harry Parker
- Claude Genest as Al Shealy
- Andrew Tarbet as Greg Stone
- Christopher Heyerdahl as Paul Enquist
- Kris Holden-Ried as Kurt Cruise (credited as Kristen Holden-Ried)
- Rita Gam as Iris Biglow
- Ellen David as Alexandra
- Richard Jutras as Adam
- Derek Johnston as Danny
- Jeremy Hill as Stan
- Daniel Skorzewski as Gammet
- Nick Baillie as Polar Bear's Partner
- Andrew Tees as Paul's Partner

== Home media ==
The film was released on DVD on June 19, 2001 by Vanguard Cinema.
