= Patricia Nolin =

Canadian actress

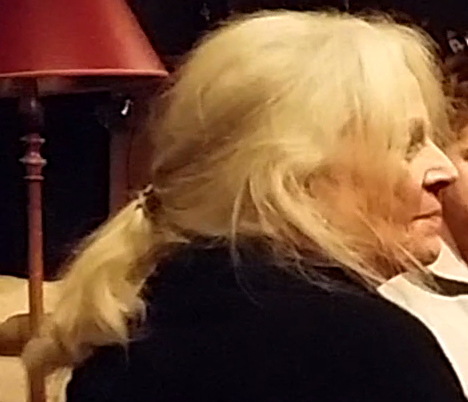
Image of Patricia Nolin

Patricia Nolin (born March 17, 1940, in Montreal, Quebec) is a Canadian actress from Quebec. She is most noted for her performance in the film Beyond Forty (La Quarantaine), for which she was a Genie Award nominee for Best Supporting Actress at the 4th Genie Awards in 1983.

She has also appeared in the films The Earth to Drink (La terre à boire), The Dame in Colour (La Dame en couleurs), Laura Laur, Cargo, Maman Last Call, Familia and And the Birds Rained Down (Il pleuvait des oiseaux).

== Filmography ==
=== Film ===
Year	Title	Role	Notes
1964	The Earth to Drink (La terre à boire)	Dominique	
1976	La piastre	Madeleine Tremblay	
1982	Beyond Forty (La Quarantaine)	Françoise	
1989	Looking for Eternity (Portion d'éternité)	Hélène	
1989	Laura Laur	Mère de Laura	
1990	Cargo	Michelle	
2005	Maman Last Call	Simone Malenfant	
2005	Familia	Estelle	
2016	9	Claudia agée	
2019	And the Birds Rained Down (Il pleuvait des oiseaux)	Mlle Polson	

=== Television ===
Year	Title	Role	Notes
1962, 1963	Jeudi-théâtre	Marita Bronsky	3 episodes
1968	Les atomistes	Agnès Beauchamp	22 episodes
1970	Les enquêteurs associés	Mme Clark	Episode: "Hold-up à Montréal"
1978	Duplessis	Auréa Cloutier	7 episodes
1982	Marc-Aurèle Fortin ou La Manière Noire	Madame Lange	Television film
1985–1988	Le parc des braves	Geneviève Adler	18 episodes
1988	Avec un grand A	Marie-Lou	Episode: "Marie-Lou et Alain, Carole et Jean-Pierre"
1997	Urgence	Dre Denise Lussier	3 episodes
2008	Nos étés	Évelynes Desrochers	Episode #4.8
2009–2013	Yamaska	Marthe Brabant	45 episodes
2013	Toute la vérité	Marthe Brabant	Episode: "Épisode 67"
2017	Béliveau	Madame Béliveau	5 episodes
2019	District 31	Pauline Daigle	3 episodes
