= Twist (2003 film) =

2003 Canadian drama film directed by Jacob Tierney

- Theatrical release poster
- Directed by: Jacob Tierney
- Written by: Jacob Tierney
- Based on: Oliver Twist by Charles Dickens
- Produced by: Victoria Hirst; Dan Lyon; Kevin Tierney
- Starring: Nick Stahl; Joshua Close
- Cinematography: Gerald Packer
- Edited by: Mitch Lackie
- Music by: Ron Proulx
- Distributed by: Christal Films (Canada); Strand Releasing
- Release dates: September 7, 2003 (TIFF); May 21, 2004 (US)
- Running time: 97 minutes
- Country: Canada
- Language: English
- Budget: $350,000
- Box office: $47,370

Twist is a 2003 Canadian drama film directed by Jacob Tierney and starring Nick Stahl and Joshua Close. It is a retelling of Charles Dickens' classic 1838 novel Oliver Twist.

== Plot ==
The plot of Oliver Twist is updated to the present day, and moved out of the London poor house onto the streets of Toronto. In addition, the tale is told not from Oliver's point of view, but rather that of Dodge (Nick Stahl). Oliver (Joshua Close) falls into the hands of down-and-out young men. Dodge takes Oliver under his wing and instructs him in the unforgiving arts of drug abuse and prostitution. Oliver develops a crush on Dodge and views him as his boyfriend, complicating their friendship. Dodge does not reciprocate his feelings, and reacts angrily to Oliver's kisses and other signs of affection. As Oliver's innocence dissolves, both young men confront their demons, and ultimately it is Dodge who finds he cannot escape his past. Dodge is found by his brother around the same time the young men's caretaker commits suicide, sending Dodge into a violent rage at the film's conclusion.

== Cast ==
- Nick Stahl as Jimmy/Dodge
- Joshua Close as Oliver
- Gary Farmer as Fagin
- Michèle-Barbara Pelletier as Nancy
- Tygh Runyan as David
- Stephen McHattie as Benjamin/The Senator
- Moti Yona as Charley
- Brigid Tierney as Betsy
- Andre Noble as Adam
- Maxwell McCabe-Lokos as Noah
- Josh Holliday as Morris
- Dave Graham as Buck
- Mike Lobel as Bully

== Reception ==
On the review aggregator website Rotten Tomatoes, 16% of 31 critics' reviews are positive, with an average rating of 4.4/10. The website's consensus reads: "Despite of [sic] its contemporary setting and some strong performances, this is a bland retelling of Oliver Twist." Metacritic, which uses a weighted average, assigned the film a score of 39 out of 100, based on 13 critics, indicating "generally unfavorable" reviews.

== See also ==
- Oliver Twist
- Twisted, a 1997 Seth Michael Donsky similarly conceived film
- Sugar, a 2004 film with a similar plot
