= Good Neighbours (film) =

2010 Canadian thriller film dir. by Jacob Tierney

- Directed by: Jacob Tierney
- Written by: Jacob Tierney
- Based on: Chère Voisine by Chrystine Brouillet
- Produced by: Kevin Tierney
- Starring: Jay Baruchel; Emily Hampshire; Scott Speedman; Xavier Dolan
- Cinematography: Guy Dufaux
- Edited by: Arthur Tarnowski
- Music by: Silver Mountain Industries
- Production company: Park Ex Pictures
- Distributed by: Alliance; Myriad Pictures
- Release date: 14 September 2010 (TIFF)
- Running time: 98 minutes
- Country: Canada
- Languages: English; French
- Box office: $7,072 (US)

Good Neighbours (onscreen title, though some movie posters in United States used spelling Good Neighbors) is a 2010 Canadian thriller film written and directed by Jacob Tierney. It is based on the book by Chrystine Brouillet.

== Plot ==
Louise works as a waitress in a Chinese restaurant in the Notre-Dame-de-Grâce neighbourhood of Montreal where she lives. She has become obsessed with the story of a recent spate of serial murders/rapes, committed in the area, and scours newspapers for stories about each victim. When the latest victim is a co-worker who last spoke of a blond, muscular man she met at the bar, and with whom she had a drink date after she got off work at midnight, she becomes much more fearful. Louise's wheelchair-using neighbour, Spencer, shared her interest to a point but values his privacy and solitude. Victor is an awkward and talkative elementary school teacher who recently moved into their apartment building, and ingratiated himself into their lives, shares her concern. Louise prefers the company of her cats, Tia Maria and Mozart, to humans. She warms to Victor who walks her home after work after her co-worker was murdered and she was questioned by an officer who fit her co-worker's description of who was supposed to get drinks with after work the night she was murdered.

Spencer dispassionately reveals to Victor that he was paralyzed in a car accident that killed his wife, and rejects Victor's sympathy. He later reacts angrily when Victor installs a wheelchair-accessible ramp in the building.

Victor, who has developed a crush on Louise, invents an imaginary love life with her and tells his brother at a party that they have become engaged. At the party, Victor surprises Louise with the arrival of his cat from China that his brother brought after its customs quarantine. Louise is instantly enamored with Balthazar. During the cover of night, Spencer sneaks out his window and climbs the fire escape, secretly enjoying the city's nightlife. He spots a woman and is later seen having sex with her seemingly dead body. Later as Spencer returns home via the fire escape, one of Victor's friends spots him. In the morning Victor dismisses the possibility that it could be Spencer. Louise comes by to see Victor's cat.

On Christmas morning, their abusive Francophone neighbour, Valérie, poisons Louise's cats. Louise spends more time at Victor's apartment, preferring to be alone with his cat and even taking the cat to her home.

Louise uses sensationalist media reports to plan the murder of Valérie. After seducing Victor, she collects a sample of his semen, which she saves. After cleaning herself up, she visits Spencer for a drink and hits on him.

Louise leaves work early claiming to be sick and tired home to begin her revenge plan. Having kept Victor's semen from their sexual encounter, Louise uses it to give the impression that Valérie has been raped as well as murdered.

After violating Valérie's corpse to plant Victor's semen and fit the serial killer's profile, Louise returns home and she runs into Spencer, who has decided to go out. With both caught in compromising positions, Louise asks for his help reaching the fire escape. She hands him her bag of evidence to which he looks surprised but he helps her nonetheless. After she asks, he gives her back her murder kit. Curious about the noise, Victor looks out his window and sees Spencer, and begins to suspect he is the serial killer.

While the same officers are questioning Louise once again, Spencer calls and invites her over for a drink and warns her not to say anything unnecessary.

That evening, Victor intercepts Louise before she goes to Spencer's for a drink. He explains what he spoke to the police about and that he saw Spencer running outside the night Valèrie was murdered and proposes trapping Spencer as he knows he will come for Victor next.

Later, Spencer outright suggests that he and Louise frame Victor for the murders, unaware that Louise has already spoken to Victor and that he wants to trap Spencer. Victor's plan involves Louise acknowledging their "engagement" after Victor mistakenly says too much to the investigating police officers.

Spencer plans a dinner party as part of the set up of Victor. As Louise leaves Victor's window open per Spencer's plan she notices the car of the investigating officers sitting across from the apartment building. Victor seems ready for what is to come as Louise says good night to him. Spencer breaks into Victor's apartment, the police who were tipped off by Victor, rush to his help, as Victor confronts Spencer and then follows him out the fire escape to prevent him from going to Louise's apartment. Spencer is about to tell Victor who really killed Valèrie but Victor kicks him and he falls off the fire escape. Louise is quite uninterested and ignores the entire conflict as she feeds Victor's cat, though once she smiled upon hearing Spencer's rage upon discovering her betrayal.

As Victor looks down at Spencer bleeding out in the snow, he seems to be in shock as the investigating officer tells Victor to call 911 while he goes down there. The officer tells Victor he did the right thing. Louise lets the cat out the window, enters Spencer's apartment, and climbs on top his fish tank.

== Cast ==
- Jay Baruchel as Victor
- Scott Speedman as Spencer
- Emily Hampshire as Louise
- Anne-Marie Cadieux as Valérie
- Diane D'Aquila as Miss Van Ilen
- Xavier Dolan as Jean-Marc
- Gary Farmer as Officer Roland Brandt
- Clara Furey as Nathalie
- Nathalie Girard as Nightclub Waitress
- Kaniehtiio Horn as Johanne
- Pat Kiely as Bilodeau
- Micheline Lanctôt as Mme Gauthier
- Sean Lu as Mr. Chou
- Jacob Tierney as Jonah
- Kevin Tierney as Jérôme Langlois

== Production ==
Tierney filmed it under the working title Notre Dame de Grâce in and around Montreal, Quebec, Canada.

== Release ==
The film had its world premiere as part of the Toronto International Film Festival on 15 September 2010. Magnolia Pictures released it for the Whistler Film Festival.

== Reception ==
Rotten Tomatoes, a review aggregator, reports that 67% of 30 surveyed critics gave the film a positive review; the average rating is 5.9/10. Metacritic gave it a weighted average rating of 60/100 based on 12 reviews, indicating "mixed or average reviews".

Jim Slotek of the Toronto Sun rated it 3.5/5 stars and wrote, "A film short on conventional action, Good Neighbours nonetheless conveys a sense of imminent danger and tightly wound passions". Stephen Cole of The Globe and Mail rated it 3/4 stars and called it "a wickedly funny noir" which satirises the 1995 Quebec referendum. John Anderson of Variety wrote that it "never finds a comfortable groove, or a tone that would enable its convoluted yet predictable plotting to engage the viewer." Kirk Honeycutt of The Hollywood Reporter called it "a kind of deconstruction of noir atmosphere and its tropes into a meditation on the treachery of the human heart." Jeannete Catsoulis of The New York Times wrote, "We are never in any doubt as to the identity of the serial killer who haunts the news and the neighborhood’s shadowy corners, but suspense is not the point — alienation is." Alison Willmore of The A.V. Club rated it B− and described it as "something of a rejection of urban communal sentiment, a cautionary tale against getting to know the locals." Paul Schrodt of Slant Magazine rated it 1.5/4 stars and wrote, "Tierney's is the kind of post-post horror-thriller that puts all of its killings in clear air quotes, making you cringe at the same time you admire its assumed cleverness."
