= Aimée Danis =

Canadian film producer and film director

Aimée Danis

Aimée Danis (September 19, 1929 - May 8, 2012) was a Canadian film director and producer from Quebec. She produced the films Léolo and My Friend Max (Mon amie Max), both of which were Genie Award nominees for Best Motion Picture.

Originally from Maniwaki, Quebec, she worked as a script assistant for Télévision de Radio-Canada, and later for Jacques Godbout on his film YUL 871, before becoming the first woman in Quebec's film and television industry to direct television commercials. Her advertising work included spots for Hydro-Québec, Dominion, Desjardins and Peugeot. In the 1970s she directed a number of short documentary films, including KW+ (1970), Gaspésie oui, j'écoute (1972), Joie de vivre au Québec (1974) and Patrick, Julie, Félix et tous les autres (1974), the narrative television film Souris, tu m'inquiètes (1973), and episodes of the television series Vingt ans Express (1967), La feuille d’érable (1969) for Onyx Films and Jo Gaillard (1975).

She won a Canadian Film Award for Best Short Documentary at the 22nd Canadian Film Awards, for KW+. In 1973, she was one of the 14 filmmakers from Quebec who signed the boycott letter protesting poor treatment of films from Quebec. The protest resulted in the cancellation of the 25th Canadian Film Awards ceremony, and the postponement of the 26th Canadian Film Awards to 1975.

She moved into production in the 1980s. Léolo was a Best Picture nominee at the 13th Genie Awards in 1992, and My Friend Max was a nominee at the 15th Genie Awards in 1994. Her other credits as a producer included the films Le diable à quatre in 1987, Les heures précieuses in 1989, The Paper Wedding (Les noces de papier) in 1990, Buster's Bedroom in 1991 and Jack Paradise: Montreal by Night (Jack Paradise: Les nuits de Montréal) in 2004.

She was married to film director Guy Fournier, with whom she was a partner in Les Productions du Verseau.
