= DC 9/11: Time of Crisis =

- Title screen
- Genre: Docudrama
- Written by: Lionel Chetwynd
- Directed by: Brian Trenchard-Smith
- Starring: Timothy Bottoms
- Music by: Lawrence Shragge
- Country of origin: United States
- Original language: English

Production
- Executive producer: Robert Halmi Sr.
- Producers: Lionel Chetwynd; Armand Leo
- Cinematography: Ousama Rawi
- Editor: John Lafferty
- Running time: 127 minutes
- Production company: Lionel Chetwynd Productions

Original release
- Network: Showtime
- Release: September 7, 2003

DC 9/11: Time of Crisis is a 2003 American docudrama television film which re-enacts the events of the September 11, 2001 attacks as seen from the point of view of President of the United States George W. Bush and his staff. It was directed by Brian Trenchard-Smith, written by Lionel Chetwynd, and stars Timothy Bottoms as Bush. It aired on Showtime on September 7, 2003.

== Premise ==
DC 9/11: Time of Crisis is a film concerning the events of 9/11 as they unfolded from the perspective of President George W. Bush and his Cabinet. The film follows the 10 days following the attacks up to September 20, 2001 when President Bush gave his Address to the nation on the same day. DC 9/11: Time of Crisis was succeeded by The Path to 9/11, in which Penny Johnson Jerald reprised her role as Condoleezza Rice.

== Plot ==
On the morning of September 11, 2001, United States Secretary of Defense Donald Rumsfeld is eating breakfast at the Pentagon with several members of the US Congress, hoping to procure an increase to the US defense budget. Rumsfeld says that they will soon need the funding as "something" is likely to occur soon given recent provocations by terrorists and rogue states.

As hijacked airplanes crash into New York's World Trade Center, US President George W. Bush is at Emma E. Booker Elementary School in Florida. White House Chief of Staff Andrew Card informs him that "a second plane has hit the second tower, America is under attack." After a few minutes, Bush prepares to leave the school, interrupting a reporter's question so as to not alarm schoolchildren as to the events unfolding in New York.

Bush then orders Rumsfeld to take the US to DEFCON 3, putting the US Armed Forces on high alert. He discusses the situation with US Vice President Dick Cheney and order the grounding of all civil aviation. He leaves Florida on Air Force One headed for Washington, DC. While in the air, Naval Intelligence uncovers a credible threat against "Angel" (the day's codeword for Air Force One). Fighter jets escort the plane in response.

The US Secret Service evacuates the White House of non-essential personnel while US Cabinet members are escorted to the Presidential Emergency Operations Center. Cheney and National Security Advisor Condoleezza Rice are informed that there is a non-responsive aircraft headed for Camp David. Cheney orders fighter jets to attempt contact, stating that if the plane does not respond or turn around it is to be shot down. The plane disappears off radar; Cheney assumes he has just caused the deaths of those on board. Bush is apprised of the situation and is told that the FAA suggests that the military did not shoot down the plane, but rather a group of passengers learned of the events in New York and took matters into their own hands. Bush wants to head back to Washington, DC, and after conferencing with the George Tenet, Director of Central Intelligence, and other members of his cabinet, he orders that Air Force One head there immediately.

Bush arrives at the White House that evening and addresses the US people, informing them that they are now in a "war on terror". Over the next hours and days, Bush consoles survivors and meets numerous times with his cabinet to determine an appropriate response, which ultimately leads to his declaration that "either you are with us or you are with the terrorists" and the subsequent wars in both Afghanistan and Iraq.

== Background information ==
=== Production ===
The writer wanted a sense of authenticity to underpin the film. To achieve this a vast amounts of research were conducted which included an interview with President Bush, which led to true scenes appearing in the film, such as: Rumsfeld's early breakfast meeting on the morning of September 11, Cheney ordering the plane being shot down, and President Bush receiving PAPD Officer George Howard's badge from his grieving mother Arlene. The writer wanted to answer a number of questions many people had that day, most notably where was President Bush and why was he out of contact for so long.

=== Cast ===
Timothy Bottoms previously played George W. Bush (in a comedic fashion) in the short-lived sitcom That's My Bush! as well as in The Crocodile Hunter: Collision Course.

Fellow cast members Gregory Itzin (John Ashcroft) and Penny Johnson Jerald (Condoleezza Rice) have also portrayed major (fictional) political figures on the series 24. Itzin played President Charles Logan during seasons 4 and 5 while Jerald played Sherry Palmer, the manipulative ex-wife of President David Palmer, during the first three seasons. Jerald also reprised playing Condoleezza Rice in 2006's The Path to 9/11.

== Cast ==
Actor	Character	Character function/role
Timothy Bottoms	George W. Bush	President of the United States
Mary Gordon Murray	Laura Bush	First Lady of the United States
Lawrence Pressman	Dick Cheney	Vice President of the United States
Penny Johnson Jerald	Condoleezza Rice	National Security Advisor
David Fonteno	Colin Powell	Secretary of State
Myron Natwick	Paul O'Neill	Secretary of the Treasury
John Cunningham	Donald Rumsfeld	Secretary of Defense
Gregory Itzin	John Ashcroft	Attorney General
George Takei	Norman Mineta	Secretary of Transportation
Stephen Macht	Paul Wolfowitz	Deputy Secretary of Defense
Gerry Mendicino	George Tenet	Director of Central Intelligence
James Carroll	Robert Mueller	Director of the Federal Bureau of Investigation
David McIlwraith	Andrew Card	White House Chief of Staff
Allan Royal	Karl Rove	Senior Advisor to the President
Carolyn Scott	Karen Hughes	Counselor to the President
James McGowan	Michael Gerson	speechwriter
Debra McGrath	Mary Matalin	Counselor to the Vice President
Doug Lennox	General Tommy Franks	Commander, United States Central Command

== Reception ==
The film was met with mild controversy during production and upon broadcast on the Showtime network in the United States. The film was also praised by the political right for portraying Bush's strong leadership in a time of crisis, while Michael Moore and others on the political left have branded the film as propagandist for attempting to portray Bush as a strong leader in complete command of the situation, and also attempting a rebuttal to the suggestion that behind the scenes Cheney was running the show.

The film received generally negative reviews from critics.

Alessandra Stanley of The New York Times, gave it a very negative review, describing it as a premature, sensationalized docudrama, that played more like a "final rewrite of a Tom Clancy screenplay" than a historical document.

Gil Jawetz, a reviewer of DVD Talk, gave the film an unfavorable review and said "There's no reason, however, to watch this film. This 9/11 is a joke".

== DVD release ==
DVD Cover Art	DVD Release	Running Time	Originally aired	Release date		
DVD Cover Art	DVD Release	Running Time	Originally aired	Region 1	Region 2	Region 4
	DC 9/11: Time of Crisis	127 Mins	2003	September 7, 2004	TBA	TBA
