= Chrystine Brouillet =

Canadian writer

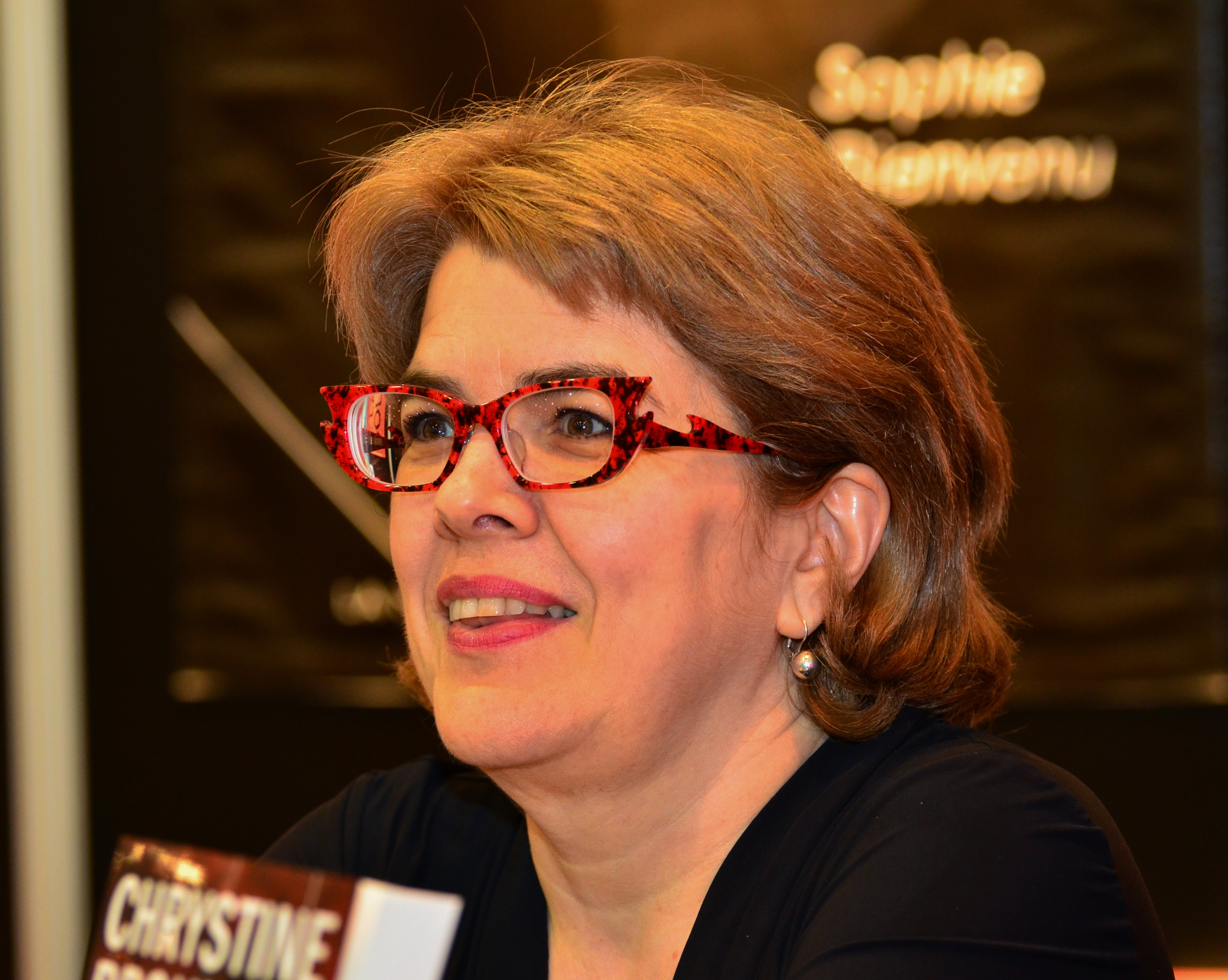
- Chrystine Brouillet in Quebec City in 2012
- Born: 15 February 1958 (age 68); Loretteville, Quebec, Canada
- Occupation: Author
- Writing career
- Genre: Children's Literature

Chrystine Brouillet, CM CQ (born 15 February 1958) is a Canadian novelist.

== Early life ==
Born in Loretteville, Quebec, Canada she was educated at Collège Notre-Dame-de-Bellevue, the Séminaire de Québec, and the Université Laval.

== Career ==
Brouillet is well known in Quebec as the author of novels for children, adults and young adults. She specializes in historical fiction and thrillers. Several of her stories take place in Quebec City or Paris.

Brouillet's first novel, Chère Voisine, published in 1982, was adapted for the screen by writer/director Jacob Tierney as Good Neighbours, starring Jay Baruchel, Emily Hampshire and Scott Speedman. It debuted at the Toronto International Film Festival 2010.

Among the many awards she has received are the French Ordre de la Pléiade and the Popular Choice award from the Salon du livre de Montréal. In 2007, she made a Member of the Order of Canada and in 2018 was made a knight of the National Order of Quebec.
