= The Trotsky =

- Theatrical release poster
- Directed by: Jacob Tierney
- Written by: Jacob Tierney
- Produced by: Kevin Tierney
- Starring: Jay Baruchel; Emily Hampshire; Colm Feore; Saul Rubinek; Michael Murphy
- Cinematography: Guy Dufaux
- Edited by: Arthur Tarnowski
- Music by: Malajube
- Production company: Portman Entertainment Group
- Distributed by: Alliance Films
- Release dates: 11 September 2009 (TIFF); 14 May 2010 (Canada)
- Running time: 120 minutes
- Country: Canada
- Language: English
- Budget: C$6.4 million (US$5.9 million)
- Box office: $440,000

The Trotsky is a 2009 Canadian comedy film directed and written by Jacob Tierney and starring Jay Baruchel, Emily Hampshire, Colm Feore, Saul Rubinek, and Michael Murphy.

== Plot ==
High School student Leon Bronstein believes that he is the reincarnation of the socialist revolutionary Leon Trotsky, whose birth name was Bronstein. Shortly after he starts to work in his family's clothing factory, he attempts to unionize the workplace with such actions as a hunger strike. He is pulled from his upper-class private school by his father and sent to the public school system. The school is run by the strong-willed principal Mr. Berkhoff and overly disciplinarian vice-principal Mrs. Davis. During his first day at school Leon witnesses Davis giving students detentions for minor offences. After school he joins the detained students in solidarity. He goes on to encourage a revolution of a sort in the school as he leads students in a fight for an influential students' union. Meanwhile, he seeks romance with an older woman, law-school graduate student Alexandra, whose personal profile is similar to a woman who figured prominently in Trotsky's life.

== Cast ==
- Jay Baruchel as Leon Bronstein, a 17-year-old high school student
- Domini Blythe as Mrs. Davis, Leon's vice-principal
- Geneviève Bujold as Denise Archambault
- Anne-Marie Cadieux as Anna Bronstein, Leon's loving stepmother
- Jesse Camacho as Skip, Leon's school friend, Sarah's (eventual) boyfriend
- Colm Feore as Principal Henry Berkhoff
- Emily Hampshire as Alexandra Leith, new law school graduate, Leon's (eventual) 27-year-old girlfriend
- David Julian Hirsh as Eli, Leon's married brother
- Tiio Horn as Caroline, Leon's school friend
- Ricky Mabe as Tony, Leon's school friend
- Michael Murphy as Frank McGovern
- Jessica Paré as Laura, Alexandra's friend
- Tommie-Amber Pirie as Sarah Bronstein, Leon's younger sister
- Saul Rubinek as David Bronstein, Leon's father

As part of the plot, Ben Mulroney plays himself, the host of etalk, interviewing "Leon Bronstein".

== Production ==
Shooting for the film began in Montreal on 27 August 2008 at Lakeside Academy.

== Release ==
The film was first previewed at the Toronto International Film Festival 11 September 2009. In the United States, it was screened at the 2010 Tribeca Film Festival. Its general Canadian release was on 14 May 2010.

== Reception ==
=== Critical response ===
The Trotsky received mostly favorable reviews from critics. The Toronto Star gave The Trotsky a positive review, particularly of the cast. Another positive review from Montreal's The Gazette noted the "inspired, often-dangerously-funny screenplay" of the "too-talented" Tierney, likening the film to Ferris Bueller's Day Off.

On review aggregation website Rotten Tomatoes the film has a rating of 79% based on 14 reviews, with an average rating of 6.9/10.

=== Box office ===
The Trotsky grossed $440,000, against a production budget of C$6.4 million.
