= Geneviève Bujold =

Canadian actress (born 1942)

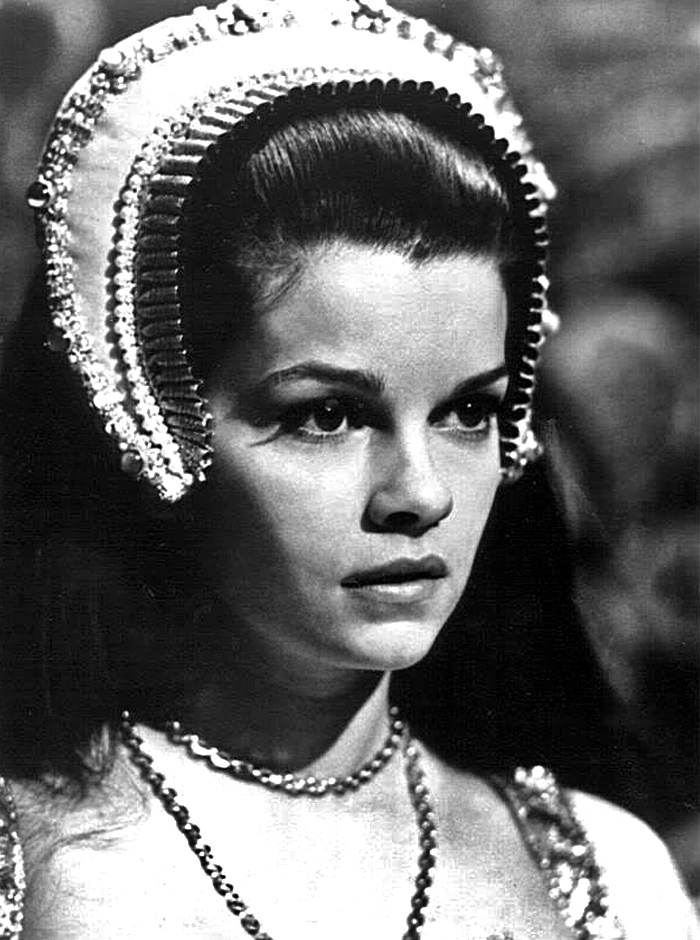
- Geneviève Bujold in Anne of the Thousand Days
- Born: July 1, 1942 (age 84); Montreal, Quebec, Canada
- Occupation: Actress
- Years active: 1962–present
- Spouse: Paul Almond (m. 1967; div. 1974)
- Partner: Dennis Hastings (1977–2017)
- Children: 2

Geneviève Bujold (French pronunciation: [ʒənvjɛv byʒo]; born July 1, 1942) is a Canadian actress. For her portrayal of Anne Boleyn in the period drama film Anne of the Thousand Days (1969), Bujold received a nomination for the Academy Award for Best Actress. Her other film credits include The Trojan Women (1971), Earthquake (1974), Obsession (1976), Coma (1978), Murder by Decree (1979), Tightrope (1984), Choose Me (1984), Dead Ringers (1988), The House of Yes (1997), and Still Mine (2012).

== Early life ==
She was born in Montreal, Quebec, the daughter of Laurette (née Cavanagh), a maid, and Joseph Firmin Bujold, a bus driver. She is of French Canadian descent, with distant Irish ancestry.

Bujold received a strict convent education for twelve years, which she disliked. She was expelled from the convent for reportedly reading Fanny by Marcel Pagnol. She entered the Montreal Conservatory of Dramatic Art, where she was trained in the classics of French theatre.

== Career ==
=== Early work ===
Two months before she was to graduate she made her stage debut as Rosine in Le Barbier de Séville in 1961 with Theâtre de Gesù. She quit the school and was rarely out of work, being in demand for radio, stage, TV and film. Bujold made her TV debut with Le square (1963), a 60-minute TV film based on a play by Marguerite Duras, co-starring Georges Groulx. She was in episodes of Jeudi-théâtre ("Atout... Meurtre") and Les belles histoires des pays d'en haut ("La terre de Bidou") and guest starred on Ti-Jean caribou. Her Canadian feature film debut was in Amanita Pestilens (1963). She was then in an international co production La fleur de l'âge, ou Les adolescentes (1964) and had a lead role in The Earth to Drink (La terre à boire) (1964), the first Quebec feature to be privately financed. Bujold starred in two 30 minute shorts, La fin des étés (1964) and Geneviève (1964). She toured Canada performing plays also worked steadily in radio and was voted actress of the year in Montreal.

=== French films ===
In 1965, she toured Russia and France with the company of the Théâtre du Rideau Vert. While in Paris, Bujold was in a play A House... and a Day when she was seen by renowned French director Alain Resnais. He selected her for a role in his film The War Is Over, opposite Yves Montand and Ingrid Thulin. She returned home briefly to appear in "Romeo and Jeannette" by Jean Anouilh alongside Michael Sarrazin, for a Canadian TV show Festival. Also for that show she did productions of The Murderer and A Doll's House. She contributed with vocals in The Devil's Toy, a documentary about skateboarding in Montreal, directed by Claude Jutra (1966).

She stayed in France to make two more films: Philippe de Broca's King of Hearts (1966), with Alan Bates, and Louis Malle's The Thief of Paris (1967), with Jean-Paul Belmondo. Bujold won the Prix Suzanne Bianchetti as the Discovery of the Year and Elle magazine called her The Girl of the Day. Despite having established herself in France, however, she returned to Canada.

=== Return to Canada ===
Then-husband Paul Almond directed her in "The Puppet Caravan" for Festival in 1967. She appeared in Michel Brault's film Between Salt and Sweet Water (1967), then went to New York to play the title role in a production of Saint Joan (1967) for Hallmark Hall of Fame on American TV. Although she said she preferred film most and television least out of all the mediums, she received great acclaim for this including an Emmy nomination.

In Canada she starred in Isabel (1968), written and directed by Almond. It was one of the first Canadian films to be picked up for distribution by a major Hollywood studio.

=== Anne of the Thousand Days and international stardom ===
International recognition came in 1969, when she starred as Anne Boleyn in Charles Jarrott's film Anne of the Thousand Days, with Richard Burton. Producer Hal B. Wallis cast her after seeing her in Isabel.

For her performance, she received the Golden Globe Award for Best Actress in a Motion Picture – Drama, and received a nomination for the Academy Award for Best Actress. It was released by Universal who signed her to a three-picture contract.

Back in Canada, she did a second feature with her husband, The Act of the Heart (1970), co starring Donald Sutherland, which earned her a Best Actress at the Canadian Film Awards. She wrote and starred in a short film, Marie-Christine (1970), directed by Claude Jutra. Wallis and Universal wanted Bujold to star in Mary, Queen of Scots (1971) but she refused so they sued her for $450,000.

Instead she played the role of Cassandra, a Greek prophet, in Michael Cacoyannis's film version of The Trojan Women (1971), opposite Katharine Hepburn, Vanessa Redgrave, and Irene Papas. It was shot in Spain. In Canada, she made Journey (1972) with Almond and co-starring John Vernon. Bujold won another Canadian Film Award for Best Actress.

She starred in Claude Jutra's Kamouraska (1973), based on a novel by Anne Hébert, for which she received her third Canadian Film Award for Best Actress. In the US, she appeared in an adaptation of Jean Anouilh's Antigone for PBS's Great Performances in 1974.

=== Hollywood ===
In 1973, after her marriage ended, she relocated to Los Angeles. Shortly thereafter, she settled the lawsuit with Universal, agreeing to a three-picture film contract starting with Earthquake (1974), with Charlton Heston.

Bujold went to France to make Incorrigible (1975) with de Broca and Belmondo. For Hallmark Hall of Fame and the BBC she appeared in Caesar and Cleopatra (1975) alongside Alec Guinness.

At Universal Studios, she was the lead in Swashbuckler (1976) alongside Robert Shaw. In an interview she said, "Robert Shaw is a man worth knowing."

In 1976, she appeared in Obsession (1976) directed by Brian De Palma co-starring Cliff Robertson (1976). Bujold made Alex & the Gypsy (1976) with Jack Lemmon and Another Man, Another Chance (1977), co-starring James Caan (1977) for Claude Lelouch.

She was lead with Michael Douglas in the medical thriller Coma (1978), directed by Michael Crichton, which was a box office hit.

Bujold returned to Canada to play a key role in the Sherlock Holmes film Murder by Decree (1979), which won her a Best Supporting Actress Award at the Canadian Film Awards.

For Walt Disney she appeared in the fantasy film The Last Flight of Noah's Ark (1980) with Elliott Gould and Charles Jarrott, director of Anne of the Thousand Days. She was directed by Almond once more in the Canadian Final Assignment (1980).

Bujold starred in a TV movie Mistress of Paradise (1981), then supported Christopher Reeve in Monsignor (1982), and Clint Eastwood in Tightrope (1984).

=== Alan Rudolph ===
Bujold starred in Choose Me (1984), directed and written by Alan Rudolph. She promptly made two more films for Rudolph: Trouble in Mind (1985) and The Moderns (1988), the latter set in Paris in the 1920s. She was part of his informal company of actors that he repeatedly used in his films, including Keith Carradine.

Bujold starred in David Cronenberg's Dead Ringers (1988) opposite Jeremy Irons, then made a TV movie Red Earth, White Earth (1989). She did False Identity (1990) with Stacy Keach.

=== Canada ===
After a long absence from Quebec, she returned to appear in two more films by Michel Brault: The Paper Wedding (1989), and My Friend Max (1994). In between she went to France to make Rue du Bac (1991), and did another film with Almond, The Dance Goes On (1991). She had support roles in Oh, What a Night (1993), and An Ambush of Ghosts (1993).

In 1993, she won the prix Guy-L'Écuyer for Mon Amie Max.

=== Star Trek ===
In 1994, Bujold was chosen to play Captain Elizabeth Janeway, the lead character in the ensemble cast of the American television series Star Trek: Voyager. However, she left the project after just two days of filming via mutual decision of both the actress and the producers. The role was quickly recast with Kate Mulgrew assuming the role of renamed Captain Kathryn Janeway.

=== Later career ===
Bujold had supporting roles in The Adventures of Pinocchio (1995), The House of Yes (1997), Last Night (1998), You Can Thank Me Later (1998), Eye of the Beholder (1999), The Bookfair Murders (2000), Children of My Heart (2001) and Alex in Wonder (2001)

Bujold co-starred with Graham Greene in Dead Innocent (1997) and appeared in a short Matisse & Picasso: A Gentle Rivalry (2001).

Bujold was back in Quebec to star in Chaos and Desire (2002), directed by Manon Briand. That year she said "I like doing studio films, independent films. I want to step up to the plate and do it. The role doesn't have to be long, but it has to be essential to the film. And it's got to be truthful to me. I defend my characters. They're like my babies."

Bujold's later appearances include Jericho Mansions (2003), Finding Home (2004), Downtown: A Street Tale (2004), By the Pricking of My Thumbs (2005), Disappearances (2006), and Deliver Me (2006).

Bujold was also in The Trotsky (2009), For the Love of God (2011), and Northern Borders (2013).

In 2012, Bujold played a woman battling dementia in the sleeper romantic drama Still Mine. Stephen Holden of The New York Times commented: "Ms. Bujold imbues Irene with a starchy tenacity and a sharp sense of humor", while The Washington Post called her performance "superb" and "remarkably detailed".

Bujold's later films include Chorus (2015).

== Personal life ==
In 1967, Bujold married Canadian director Paul Almond. They had a son, Matthew, in 1968. After a separation of approximately two years, the couple divorced in 1974.

In 1980, she had a second son, Emmanuel, with Dennis Hastings, a Reno-born carpenter whom she met in 1977 when he was contracted to build her Malibu house. They separated in 2017. Hastings died in 2020.

== Accolades ==
Year	Association	Category	Work	Result
1967	Prix Suzanne Bianchetti	Most Promising Young Actress	The Thief of Paris	Won
1968	Emmy Awards	Outstanding Single Performance by an Actress in a Leading Role in a Drama	Saint Joan	Nominated
1968	Canadian Film Awards	Best Actress	Isabel	Won
1970	Academy Awards	Best Actress	Anne of the Thousand Days	Nominated
1970	Golden Globe Awards	Best Actress in a Motion Picture – Drama	Anne of the Thousand Days	Won
1970	Canadian Film Awards	Best Actress	The Act of the Heart	Won
1973	Canadian Film Awards	Best Actress	Kamouraska	Won
1980	Genie Awards	Best Supporting Actress	Murder by Decree	Won
1981	Genie Awards	Performance by an Actress in a Leading Role	Final Assignment	Nominated
1988	Los Angeles Film Critics Association	Best Supporting Actress	Dead Ringers & The Moderns	Won
1988	Prix Gémeaux	Best Actress	L'Emprise	Nominated
1989	Genie Awards	Performance by an Actress in a Leading Role	Dead Ringers	Nominated
1990	Prix Gémeaux	Best Actress	The Paper Wedding	Won
1994	Genie Awards	Performance by an Actress in a Leading Role	My Friend Max	Nominated
1998	Genie Awards	Performance by an Actress in a Supporting Role	Last Night	Nominated
2010	Canadian Comedy Awards	Best Performance by a Female - Film	The Trotsky	Nominated
2013	Canadian Screen Awards	Performance by an Actress in a Leading Role	Still Mine	Nominated
2018	Governor General's Performing Arts Awards	Lifetime Artistic Achievement Award (Film)		Won

== Filmography ==
=== Film ===
Year	Title	Role	Notes
1963	Amanita Pestilens	Sophie Martin	
1964	The Adolescents (La fleur de l'âge, ou Les adolescentes); Segment "Geneviève"	Genevieve	
1964	The Earth to Drink (La terre à boire)	Barbara	
1964	La fin des étés	Marie	Short subject
1966	The War Is Over (La Guerre est finie)	Nadine Sallanches	
1966	King of Hearts (Le Roi de cœur)	Poppy	
1967	The Thief of Paris (Le Voleur)	Charlotte Randal	
1967	Between Salt and Sweet Water (Entre la mer et l'eau douce)	Geneviève	
1968	Isabel	Isabel	
1969	Anne of the Thousand Days	Anne Boleyn	
1970	Marie-Christine		Short subject
1970	The Act of the Heart	Martha Hayes	
1971	The Trojan Women	Cassandra	
1972	Journey	Saguenay	
1973	Kamouraska	Élisabeth d'Aulnieres	
1974	Earthquake	Denise Marshall	
1975	Incorrigible (L'incorrigible)	Marie-Charlotte Pontalec	
1976	Swashbuckler	Jane Barnet	
1976	Obsession	Elizabeth Courtland / Sandra Portinari	
1976	Alex & the Gypsy	Maritza	
1977	Another Man, Another Chance (Un autre homme, une autre chance)	Jeanne Leroy née Perriere	
1978	Coma	Dr. Susan Wheeler	
1979	Murder by Decree	Annie Crook	
1980	The Last Flight of Noah's Ark	Bernadette Lafleur	
1980	Final Assignment	Nicole Thomson	
1982	Monsignor	Carla	
1984	Tightrope	Beryl Thibodeaux	
1984	Choose Me	Nancy	
1985	Trouble in Mind	Wanda	
1988	Rough Justice		
1988	The Moderns	Libby Valentin	
1988	Dead Ringers	Claire Niveau	
1990	False Identity	Rachel Roux	
1991	Rue du Bac	Marie Aubriac	
1992	The Dance Goes On	Rick's Mother	
1992	Oh, What a Night	Eva	
1993	An Ambush of Ghosts	Irene Betts	
1994	My Friend Max (Mon amie Max)	Marie-Alexandrine Brabant	
1996	The Adventures of Pinocchio	Leona	
1997	The House of Yes	Mrs. Pascal	
1997	Dead Innocent	Suzanne St. Laurent	
1998	Last Night	Mrs. Carlton	
1998	You Can Thank Me Later	Joelle	
1999	Eye of the Beholder	Dr. Jeanne Brault	
2001	Alex in Wonder	Natalie	
2002	Chaos and Desire (La Turbulence des fluides)	Colette Lasalle	
2003	Jericho Mansions	Lily Melnick	
2003	Finding Home	Katie	
2004	Downtown: A Street Tale	Aimee Levesque	
2005	By the Pricking of My Thumbs (Mon petit doigt m'a dit...)	Rose Evangelista	
2006	Disappearances	Cordelia Bonhomme	
2006	Deliver Me (Délivrez-moi)	Irène	
2009	The Trotsky	Denise Archambault	
2011	For the Love of God (Pour l'amour de Dieu)	Soeur Cécile 72 ans	
2012	Still Mine	Irene Morrison	
2013	The Legend of Sarila (La Légende de Sarila)	Saya (English version, voice)	
2013	Northern Borders	Abiah Kittredge	
2015	Chorus	Gabrielle	
2018	Two Girls	Adult Johanna (voice)	

=== Television ===
Year	Title	Role	Notes
1962–1963	Marcus		TV series
1963	Le square	Her	TV movie
1963	Jeudi-théâtre	Elle / La standardiste de l'hôtel	TV series
1963	Ti-Jean caribou		TV series
1963–1964	Les Belles Histoires des pays d'en haut	Julie Fourchu	TV series
1965–1967	Festival	Jeannette / Nora / Sonia	TV series
1967	Saint Joan	Joan of Arc	TV movie
1974	Antigone	Antigone	TV movie
1976	Caesar and Cleopatra	Cleopatra	TV movie
1981	Mistress of Paradise	Elizabeth Beaufort	TV movie
1988	L'Emprise		TV movie
1989	Red Earth, White Earth	Madeline	TV movie
1989	The Paper Wedding	Claire Rocheleau	TV movie
2000	The Bookfair Murders	Margaret Dourie Cantor	TV movie
2000	Children of My Heart	Gabrielle Roy	TV movie
