= Saint Joan (1967 film) =

Saint Joan is a 1967 American TV film adaptation of the 1923 George Bernard Shaw play Saint Joan for the Hallmark Hall of Fame. It was directed by George Schaefer.

The cast was announced August 1967. Geneviève Bujold played the title role and was nominated for the 1968 Emmy Award for Outstanding Single Performance by an Actress in a Leading Role. Taping took place over four weeks.

== Cast ==
- Theodore Bikel as Robert de Baudricourt
- David Birney as Ladvenu
- Geneviève Bujold as Saint Joan of Arc
- James Daly as Jack Dunois
- John Devlin as Poulengry
- James Donald as Richard Warwick
- Dana Elcar as La Hire
- Maurice Evans as Bishop Cauchon
- Chris Gampel as The Executioner
- Leo Genn as Archbishop of Rheims
- William Hickey as The Steward
- William LeMassena as D'Estivet
- Michael Lewis as La Teremouille
- Ian Martin as English Soldier
- Raymond Massey as The Inquisitor
- Roddy McDowall as Charles, The Dauphin
- George Rose as Chaplain de Stogumber
- Ted Van Griethuysen as Bluebeard

== Reception ==
The production was well received, with one critic calling it "wonderfully good" and another calling it "absorbing and exciting".
