= Mistress of Paradise =

- Genre: Drama; Mystery; Romance
- Written by: William Bast; Bennett Foster
- Directed by: Peter Medak
- Starring: Geneviève Bujold; Chad Everett; Anthony Andrews
- Music by: John Addison
- Country of origin: United States
- Original language: English

Production
- Executive producers: Joanne Brough; Malcolm Stuart
- Producer: R. W. Goodwin
- Cinematography: Ken Lamkin
- Editor: Lori Jane Coleman (as Hilary Jane Kranze)
- Running time: 100 minutes
- Production company: Lorimar Productions

Original release
- Network: ABC
- Release: October 4, 1981

Mistress of Paradise is a 1981 American television film starring Genevieve Bujold.

== Plot ==
A woman marries a plantation owner.

== Cast ==
- Geneviève Bujold as Elizabeth Beaufort
- Chad Everett as Charles Beaufort
- Anthony Andrews as Buckley
- Olivia Cole as Victorine
- Lelia Goldoni as Peg
- Carolyn Seymour as Adele
- John McLiam as Nathan Mackay
- Myron Natwick as Dr. Slocum
- Fred D. Scott as Franklin
- Bill Wiley as Captain Tyler
- Tonea Stuart as Sister Sarah
- Valarian Smith as Jimmy

== Home video release ==
In some regions, notably Norway and Sweden, the TV movie was released on home video under the title Mystery of Paradise.

== Broadcast ==
The film was broadcast on Sunday, October 4, 1981. The broadcast was closed-captioned.
