= Kevin Tierney =

Canadian film producer (1950–2018)

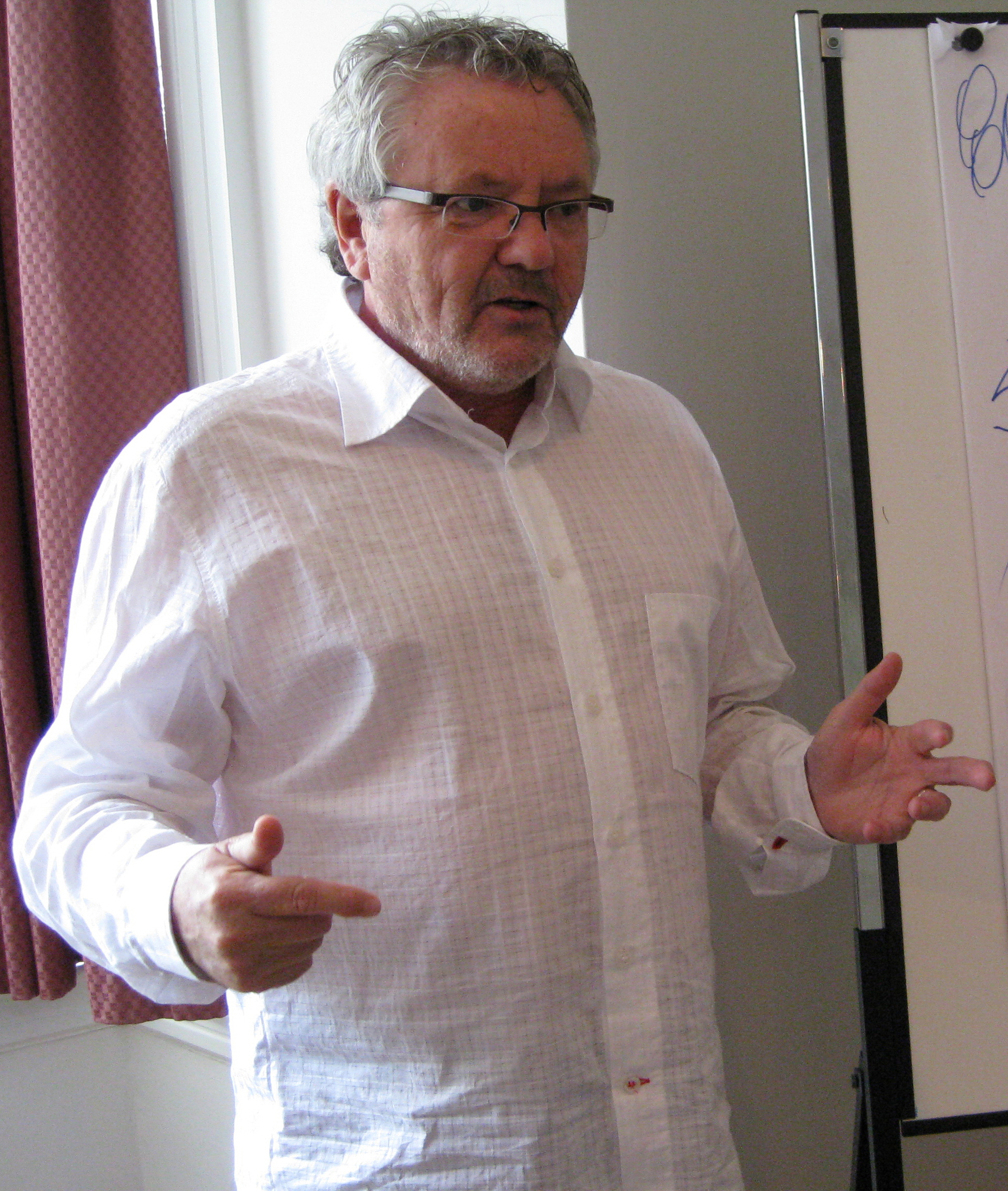
- Tierney in October 2008
- Born: August 27, 1950; Montreal, Quebec, Canada
- Died: May 12, 2018 (aged 67); Montreal, Quebec, Canada
- Education: Sir George Williams University, Concordia University, McGill University
- Known for: Film producer
- Notable work: Bon Cop, Bad Cop
- Spouse: Terry Smiley
- Children: Jacob Tierney
- Awards: Genie Award for Best Motion Picture

Kevin Tierney (August 27, 1950 – May 12, 2018) was a Canadian film producer from Montreal who co-wrote and produced the most successful Canadian film ranked by domestic box office at the time, Bon Cop, Bad Cop, for which he earned a Golden Reel, the Genie Award for Best Motion Picture in 2007. He is a former vice-chair of the Academy of Canadian Cinema & Television and former chair of the board of Cinémathèque québécoise.

== Movie career ==
With characters trading lines in both English and French, Tierney saw Bon Cop, Bad Cop as a normal Canadian plot line about a Sûreté du Québec cop teaming up with an Ontario Provincial Police investigator: "When I first heard the premise of this movie from Patrick Huard ... how the hell did we not already make this movie? It’s ridiculous." Tierney returned to the language theme in 2011 by directing the movie French Immersion.

Tierney also produced other titles including Varian's War, One Dead Indian, Good Neighbours and Twist. In addition to the big screen, Tierney produced several television (mini)series, including Barnum, Bonanno: The Story of a Godfather, Armistead Maupin's Tales of the City and The Memoirs of Pierre Trudeau. He also executive produced the TV movie Choice: The Henry Morgentaler Story.

In addition to professional recognition, Tierney received a Sheila and Victor Goldbloom Distinguished Community Service Award in 2013 as a community leader. At the 7th Canadian Screen Awards in 2019, he received a posthumous Board of Directors Tribute Award from the Academy of Canadian Cinema and Television.

== Personal life and death ==
Tierney was born in Montreal and raised in Park Extension, and graduated from Sir George Williams University (BA in 1971), Concordia University (Diploma in Comms Studies, 1978) and McGill University (BEd, Education, 1974). He then taught English as a second or foreign language (ESL) in Chad and China. Tierney learned Standard French at age 24 while teaching in Algeria.

He also taught English at John Abbott College in the late 1970s. Tierney wrote an arts column in the Montreal Gazette newspaper.

Tierney was married to Terry Smiley. He was the father of Canadian actor and director Jacob Tierney and Brigid, who is an actress. He produced Jacob's 2009 film The Trotsky. In 2009 he used his award from the Canadian Film and Television Production Association’s Producer of the Year Award at the Toronto International Film Festival to establish the Pat and Bill Tierney Scholarship at Concordia University, naming it after his parents.

Tierney died, after a three-year battle with cancer, on May 12, 2018, surrounded by his family.
