= Because News =

Canadian radio and television program

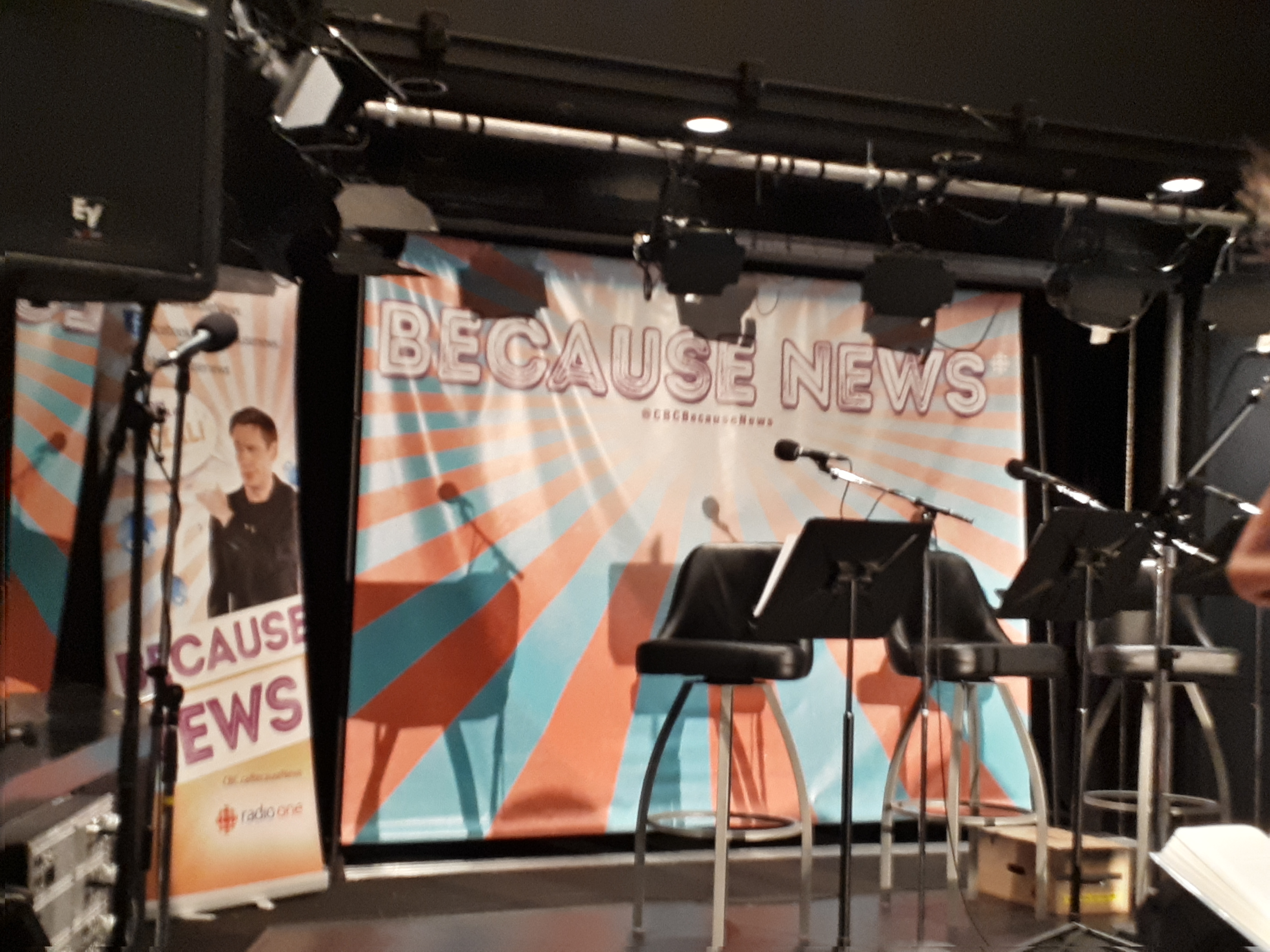
- Set in Toronto before a taping, 2019.
- Genre: Panel show
- Running time: 26 minutes
- Country of origin: Canada
- Language: English
- Home station: CBC Radio One
- Hosted by: Gavin Crawford
- Produced by: Elizabeth Bowie, David Carroll
- Recording studio: Canadian Broadcasting Centre, Toronto
- Original release: September 5, 2015
- Audio format: Monophonic
- Website: cbc.ca/becausenews

Because News is a Canadian radio and television program, which airs weekly on CBC Radio One. Hosted by comedian Gavin Crawford, the program is a panel show, on which three celebrity panelists, often but not always stand-up comedians, compete to answer questions about current news stories. The program also features brief comedy interludes focused on Crawford's voice impersonations of personalities in the news.

The program debuted in September 2015. Episodes are usually taped at the Canadian Broadcasting Centre in Toronto, although selected episodes have been recorded in other cities.

A television version of the program premiered on CBC Television in October 2020.

In 2022–23, the program focused on developing its TikTok channel. American broadcaster Ira Glass identified Because News as the strongest example of a public radio brand building a large audience on TikTok. The producers identified keys to their success as cutting content into short clips, targeting hyperlocal audiences, engaging lightheartedly with commenters, and not trying to cater to major TikTok trends of the moment.
