= The Earth to Drink =

- French: La terre à boire
- Directed by: Jean-Paul Bernier
- Written by: Patrick Straram; Jean-Paul Bernier
- Produced by: Jacques Lasnier
- Starring: Patrick Straram; Geneviève Bujold; Pauline Julien; Patricia Nolin; Gilles Pelletier
- Cinematography: Laval Fortier
- Edited by: Jean-Paul Bernier
- Music by: Stéphane Venne
- Production company: Les Films du Nouveau Québec
- Release date: October 9, 1964
- Running time: 77 minutes
- Country: Canada
- Language: French
- Budget: $65,000

The Earth to Drink (French: La Terre à boire) is a Canadian drama film, directed by Jean-Paul Bernier and released in 1964. The film centres on a romance between Patrick (Patrick Straram), a journalist, and Barbara (Geneviève Bujold), a younger art student who ultimately causes Patrick's accidental death.

It had a budget of $65,000 and was the first Quebec film to be privately financed. It had difficulties with local censors, reportedly because of a sex scene that was deemed "too intense".

The film was not positively reviewed by critics. It became the only film Bernier ever directed, although most of its cast went on to build longer sustained careers in Quebec and international film.

== Cast ==
- Patrick Straram as Patrick
- Geneviève Bujold as Barbara
- Pauline Julien as Diane
- Patricia Nolin as Dominique
- Gilles Pelletier as Michel, Barbara's father
