= The Paper Wedding =

- French: Les Noces de papier
- Directed by: Michel Brault
- Written by: Jefferson Lewis
- Produced by: Danièle Bussy; Aimée Danis
- Starring: Geneviève Bujold; Manuel Aranguiz; Dorothée Berryman
- Cinematography: Sylvain Brault
- Edited by: Jacques Gagné
- Production company: Les Productions du Verseau
- Distributed by: Max Films (Canada); Capitol Entertainment (United States); Films Transit (international)
- Release date: August 30, 1989 (MWFF)
- Running time: 95 minutes
- Country: Canada
- Language: French
- Budget: $846,000-889,000
- Box office: $300,000

The Paper Wedding (French: Les noces de papier) is a 1989 made for television Canadian film directed by Michel Brault. It was entered into the 40th Berlin International Film Festival.

== Plot ==
Claire is a teacher in Montreal, Quebec, who lives alone. Her lover, Milosh, is married and their relationship is strained. Claire's sister, Annie, a lawyer, has a problem. The visa of her client Pablo, a political refugee from Chile illegally working as a dishwasher in a restaurant, is about to expire. She asks Claire to marry him so he can remain in Canada. Claire reluctantly agrees. Before the modest civil ceremony can be concluded, immigration agents arrive, but everyone escapes.

Claire's mother is thrilled to arrange a big church wedding and reception instead. Afterwards, Claire and Pablo go their separate ways. But soon, immigration agents are back knowing what's going on and the two are forced to live together. There, Claire notices that Pablo (who has fallen for her) has nightmares. When they get to know each other, Pablo tells Claire that he was a tortured political prisoner, among other things.

In case they are questioned by the Canadian officers, Claire and Pablo try to make up a story about how they met. Pablo's romantic story touches Claire, and in time, she finds she has fallen for him as well.

== Cast ==
- Geneviève Bujold as Claire Rocheleau
- Dorothée Berryman as Annie
- Manuel Aranguiz as Pablo Torres
- Monique Lepage as Gaby
- Teo Spychalski as Milosh Velansky
- Jorge Fajardo as Miguel Espinoza
- Gilbert Sicotte as Bouchard
- Jean Mathieu as Theriault
- Suzanne Marier as Alexa

== Production ==
Screenwriter Jefferson Lewis heard about his sister's roommate, who married a Frenchman despite not knowing him in order to give him citizenship, but the two later fell into love. Lewis had not written a feature film and his experience was writing a few episodes of Mount Royal and documentaries about Henry Morgentaler and Wilder Penfield. He wrote a 20-page film treatment three to four years after coming up with the idea and summited it to the Société Générale des Industries Culturelle. Lewis was given a $8,000 grant to write a first draft.

Aimée Danis, the founder and executive producer of Les Productions du Verseau, called Lewis to inquire if he had any ideas. Lewis "sent along two or three things, including this outline" and Danis supported it. Danièle Bussy, who had never produced a feature film, was selected to produce by Danis.

Geneviève Bujold, Lewis' first choice for the lead role, was paid $50,000, less than her normal pay, to appear in the film. Bujold recently starred in another Verseau film, L'Emprise, and said she would star in another one of their films if Michel Brault directed. Danis already retained the services of Claude Fournier to direct, but Bussy bought him out of the agreement. Brault, who last feature film was Orders fifteen years prior, agreed to direct in summer 1988.

They had difficulty casting Pablo, the role was left unfilled until a few weeks before production started, and Bussy contacted several Latin American organizations. In September 1988, Lewis saw Manuel Aránguiz introducing a Spanish-language TV documentary about El Salvador and sent the tape to Bussy. Aránguiz was paid $12,000.

Lewis wrote the first draft in English under the title Bye Bye, Love in a month. He wrote the second draft in French. In the first draft Claire's sister was having an affair with a Latin American immigrant and asked Claire to marry him, but Brault pushed for changes to simplify the plot.

The film cost between $846,000 and $889,000 and went overbudget by $40,000. It was shot over the course of twenty days in October 1988. Jacques Gagné edited the film from winter 1988 to spring 1989.

== Release ==
The film premiered in August 1989 at the Montreal World Film Festival, It was shown by Radio-Québec in October 1989, and watched by 300,000 people. It was sold to the Canadian Broadcasting Corporation for $75,000.

Jan Rofekamp, the president of Films Transit, attended the Nyon International Documentary Film Festival and met with Moritz de Hadeln, the director of the Berlin International Film Festival, and asked him to consider The Paper Wedding for the festival. De Hadeln told Rokekamp one week before Christmas that the film was accepted. It was blown up to 35 mm at a cost of $120,000, funded by SOGIC and Telefilm Canada.

Rofekamp sold the film to a total of forty-three countries after the Berlin film festival. It was also shown at the Banff Television Festival. Radio-Québec opposed releasing the film theatrically in Canada, but Pierre Latour called a senior executive and was able to secure permission.

The Paper Wedding was released by Max Films in Canada, Capitol Entertainment in the United States, and Films Transit internationally. Max Films spent $75,000-100,000 advertising the film in Canada, where it earned $200,000. The film opened in the United States in New York City on 21 June 1991, where it was a financial failure despite earning USD$250,000 in the country. It earned $100,000 in France during its theatrical release.

== Reception ==
The 1990 American film Green Card, starring Gérard Dépardieu and Andie MacDowell, featured marked similarities to The Paper Wedding.

The film won the award for Best TV Feature at the 1990 Banff World Media Festival. It won six Gémeaux Awards in December 1990, including for best dramatic production, best photography (Sylvain Brault), best writing (Jefferson Lewis), best direction (Michel Brault), best actor in a miniseries or television film (Aranguiz) and best actress in a miniseries or television film (Bujold). Brault submitted the film for the SOGIC's bets film award, which had a $100,000 prize, but was rejected because it was first shown on television. Brault appealed to the Superior Court of Quebec, but was lost.

== Works cited ==
- Marshall, Bill (2001). Quebec National Cinema. McGill–Queen's University Press. ISBN 0-7735-2103-8.
- Posner, Michael (1993). Canadian Dreams: The Making and Marketing of Independent Films. Canadian Independent Film Caucus. ISBN 1550541145.
