= Jacob Tierney =

Canadian actor and director (born 1979)

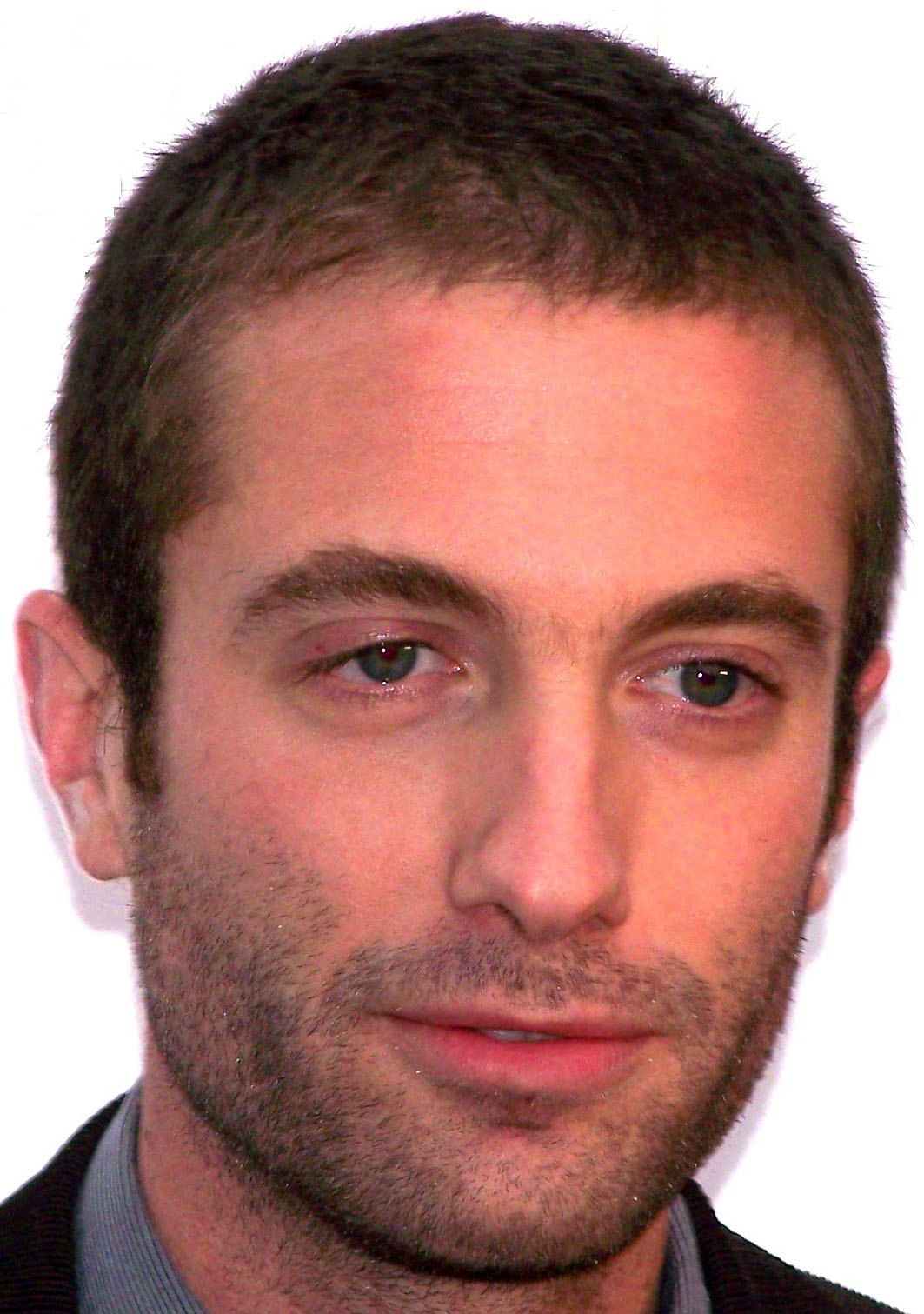
- Tierney in 2007
- Born: September 26, 1979 (age 47); Montreal, Quebec, Canada
- Occupations: Actor; director; screenwriter; producer
- Years active: 1986–present
- Father: Kevin Tierney

Jacob Daniel Tierney (born September 26, 1979) is a Canadian actor, director, screenwriter, and producer of film and television. He is the co-creator, co-writer, director, and executive producer of the Canadian sitcom Letterkenny (2016–2023), the executive producer and director of the first two seasons of its spinoff series, Shoresy (2022–2023), and the creator, writer, director and executive producer of the sports romance series Heated Rivalry (2025–present).

He began his career as a child actor, most notably playing Eric in the horror anthology series Are You Afraid of the Dark? (1990–1992). He later began writing and directing, making his feature film debut with Twist (2003), followed by The Trotsky (2009), Good Neighbours (2011), and Preggoland (2014).

== Early life ==
Tierney was born in Montreal, Quebec, Canada, on September 26, 1979, to Terry (née Smiley) and Kevin Tierney. His father was a screenwriter and film producer best known for co-writing and producing Bon Cop, Bad Cop (2006), the most successful Canadian film at the domestic box office at the time. Tierney is of Irish and Jewish descent.

== Career ==
Tierney began his career as a child actor, beginning at age six. He made his directorial debut in 2002 with his short film, titled Dad.

Since Dad, Tierney has written and directed the feature films Twist (2003), for which he was nominated for a Genie Award for Best Adapted Screenplay; The Trotsky (2009), which garnered him two Canadian Comedy Awards and a Genie Award; Good Neighbours (2010); and Preggoland (2014). He has also directed episodes of the television sitcom Mr. D and Gavin Crawford's comedy special Gavin Crawford's Wild West. In 2012, Tierney participated in the jury of the Air Canada enRoute Film Festival.

Tierney made his stage directing debut in 2015 with a production of Travesties by Tom Stoppard at the Segal Centre in Montreal. In 2017, he returned to the Segal Centre to direct Noises Off by Michael Frayn.

Tierney is the co-writer, director, and executive producer of the sitcom Letterkenny, in which he also stars as Pastor Glen. At the 5th Canadian Screen Awards in 2017, Tierney won several awards for his work on the series, including the Canadian Screen Award for Best Comedy Series. In 2018, Tierney won the Canadian Screen Awards for Best Direction in a Comedy Series, as well as Best Writing in a Comedy Series alongside Letterkenny creator and star Jared Keeso.

Tierney is the creator and writer-director-executive producer of the sports romance series Heated Rivalry, which premiered in November 2025 in Canada and internationally.

In March 2026, it was announced that Tierney would be partnering with Netflix and Aggregate Films to write and direct Alexander, an adaptation of Canadian author Annabel Lyon's novel The Golden Mean. The television series, a drama, will explore a young Alexander the Great's relationship with his tutor, Aristotle.

== Personal life ==
Tierney has one younger sister, Brigid, who is an actress. He is gay. In 2022, Tierney revealed he was HIV-positive at the age of 43; a year later, he was diagnosed with type 1 diabetes.

== Filmography ==
=== Film ===
| Year | Title | Role | Notes | Ref. |
|---|---|---|---|---|
| 1988 | Horses in Winter | Ben Waxman at age 9 | | |
| 1988 | Pin | Leon, age 7 | | |
| 1989 | Mindfield | Mario | | |
| 1990 | Nathaël and the Seal Hunt | (voice) | Short film | |
| 1993 | Josh and S.A.M. | Joshua 'Josh' Whitney | | |
| 1995 | The Neon Bible | David, age 15 | | |
| 1995 | Rainbow | Steven Bailey | | |
| 1998 | Motel | Young Tom | | |
| 1998 | This Is My Father | Jack | | |
| 1998 | Dead End | Adam Compton | | |
| 1999 | You Can Thank Me Later | Simon Cooperberg | | |
| 1999 | The Life Before This | Justin | | |
| 2000 | Poor White Trash | Lennie Lake | | |
| 2002 | Dad | Dad/Edward | Short film Also writer and director | |
| 2003 | Twist | | Writer and director | |
| 2004 | Trouser Accidents | Mark | Short film | |
| 2004 | Blood | Chris Terry | | |
| 2007 | Walk All Over Me | Paul | | |
| 2009 | The Trotsky | V.I. (Lenin) | Writer and director | |
| 2010 | Good Neighbours | Jonah | Writer and director | |
| 2011 | Sorry, Rabbi | Josh | Short film | |
| 2011 | French Immersion | Jonathan Hornstein | | |
| 2012 | Camion | Jacob | | |
| 2016 | Lovesick | Dash | | |
| 2018 | The Death & Life of John F. Donovan | | Co-writer; with Xavier Dolan | |

=== Television ===
| Year | Title | Role | Notes | Ref. |
|---|---|---|---|---|
| 1988 | Extra! Extra! | | Unknown episodes | |
| 1988 | Hitting Home | David Hughes | TV movie | |
| 1990–91 | Dracula: The Series | Max Townsend | 21 episodes | |
| 1992 | Are You Afraid of the Dark? | Eric | 13 episodes | |
| 1991–92 | Watatatow | Greg | 14 episodes | |
| 1992 | A Bunch of Munsch | (voice) | Episode: "Angela's Airplane/The Fire Station" | |
| 1994 | TekWar: TekJustice | Eugene Leopold | TV movie | |
| 1995–98 | The Little Lulu Show | Wilbur Van Snobbe (voice) (Snobby American accent) | Unknown episodes | |
| 1997 | Princess Sissi | Prince Karl (voice) | Unknown episodes | |
| 1997 | Whiskers | Jed Martin (21 years old) | TV movie | |
| 1999 | The Hunger | Snake | Episode: "Nunc Dimittis" | |
| 1999–2000 | Big Wolf on Campus | Brother Ambrose | 2 episodes | |
| 2000 | Touched by an Angel | Max | Episode: "Legacy" | |
| 2000 | A Diva's Christmas Carol | Guy Playing Charades | TV movie Uncredited | |
| 2003 | Hey Joel | Kevin Cornwallis (voice) | 13 episodes | |
| 2005 | Murder in the Hamptons | Generosa's R.E. Coworker | TV movie | |
| 2005 | Slings and Arrows | Scott | 4 episodes | |
| 2005 | The Many Trials of One Jane Doe | Eric Golden | TV movie | |
| 2007 | St. Urbain's Horsemen | Joey | TV miniseries | |
| 2016–23 | Letterkenny | Pastor Glen | Also co-creator, writer, director, executive producer 54 episodes | |
| 2021 | The Moodys | | Director; 4 episodes | |
| 2022–23 | Shoresy | Benoit "Benny" Brodeur | Director, executive producer | |
| 2025–present | Heated Rivalry | Director | Actor; episode: "Rookies"; Also creator, writer, director, executive producer (6 episodes) | |
| TBA | Alexander | | Writer, director, executive producer | |

== Awards and nominations ==
| Year | Award | Category | Work | Result | Ref. |
|---|---|---|---|---|---|
| 2004 | Genie Awards | Best Adapted Screenplay | Twist | Nominated | |
| 2004 | Genie Awards | Achievement in Music – Original Song | Twist | Won | |
| 2010 | Canadian Comedy Awards | Best Writing – Film | The Trotsky | Won | |
| 2010 | Canadian Comedy Awards | Best Direction – Film | The Trotsky | Won | |
| 2010 | Genie Awards | Best Original Screenplay | The Trotsky | Won | |
| 2014 | Canadian Screen Awards | Best Direction in a Comedy Program or Series | Gavin Crawford's Wild West | Nominated | |
| 2014 | Vancouver International Film Festival Awards | Most Popular Canadian Feature Film | Preggoland | Won | |
| 2015 | Directors Guild of Canada Awards | Best Direction – Feature Film | Preggoland | Nominated | |
| 2015 | Omaha Film Festival Awards | Audience Choice Feature Film | Preggoland | Won | |
| 2016 | Canadian Screen Awards | Best Direction in a Comedy Program or Series | Mr D | Nominated | |
| 2017 | Canadian Screen Awards | Best Direction in a Comedy Program or Series | Letterkenny | Won | |
| 2017 | Canadian Screen Awards | Best Writing in a Comedy Program or Series (shared with Jared Keeso) | Letterkenny | Won | |
| 2017 | Canadian Screen Awards | Best Comedy Series (shared with Mark Montefiore, Patrick O'Sullivan, Jared Keeso) | Letterkenny | Won | |
| 2017 | WGC Screenwriting Awards | Best Script From a Rookie Series (shared with Jared Keeso) | Letterkenny | Nominated | |
| 2017 | WGC Screenwriting Awards | Best TV Comedy (shared with Jared Keeso) | Letterkenny | Won | |
| 2026 | Canadian Screen Awards | Best Drama Series (shared with Brendan Brady) | Heated Rivalry | Won | |
| 2026 | Canadian Screen Awards | Best Direction, Drama Series | Heated Rivalry | Won | |
| 2026 | Canadian Screen Awards | Best Writing, Drama Series | Heated Rivalry | Won | |
