= Doug Morency =

Doug Morency is a Canadian actor and comedian who was a member of The Second City comedy troupe and The Williamson Playboys. He played Al Gore in a comedy show about global warming called An Inconvenient Musical.

Morency has won three Canadian Comedy Awards; two for Best Male Improviser (2003 and 2005) and one for Best Comedic Play in 2004.

== Filmography ==
=== Film ===
Year	Title	Role	Notes
2016	Emma's Chance	Horse Show Announcer	
2018	Hide in the Light	Father Thomas	
2022	Loren & Rose	Photographer	

=== Television ===
Year	Title	Role	Notes
1999	SketchCom	Various	2 episodes
2000–2003	The Gavin Crawford Show	Ed Bucchan	30 episodes
2006	G-Spot	Writer #2	Episode: "Blind Faith"
2008	Last Comic Standing	Cecil Jr.	Episode: "Auditions 2"
2008–2010	Degrassi: The Next Generation	Mr. Bince	15 episodes
2010	CBC Winnipeg Comedy Festival	Cecil Jr.	Episode: "Cradle to the Grave"
2010	Degrassi Takes Manhattan	Mr. Bince	Television film
2011	Criminal Minds	Mr. Elcott	Episode: "Proof"
2013	Anger Management	Couple Man #4	Episode: "Charlie and Kate Start a Sex Study"
2013	Mortal Kombat: Legacy	Owner / Dad	Episode: "Liu Kang and Kung Lao Reunite in Macau"
2013	Jimmy Kimmel Live!	Peter Dixon	Episode #11.72
2013	Brooklyn Nine-Nine	Sergeant	Episode: "Old School"
2013	You're Whole	Boss	Episode: "Droppin' the 'G'/Ancient Egypt/Puffy Paints"
2014	The Middle	Jordan's Dad	Episode: "The Smell"
2015	Mike & Molly	Driver	Episode: "Checkpoint Joyce"
2015	The Odd Couple	Frank	Episode: "Heal Thyself"
2015	Mom	Dave	Episode: "Horny-Goggles and a Catered Intervention"
2015	Paradise Pictures	George	Television film
2016	Conan	Man	Episode: "Wanda Sykes/Sharon Horgan/Aurora"
2016	The Soul Man	Diner #1	Episode: "Boyce's Choices"
2017	The Big Bang Theory	Stranger	Episode: "The Collaboration Fluctuation"
2021	Young Sheldon	Dr. Willard	Episode: "A Pager, a Club and a Cranky Bag of Wrinkles"
