= Malcolm Bosse =

American novelist

Malcolm Joseph Bosse (May 6, 1926 – May 3, 2002) was an American author of both young adult and adult novels. His novels are often set in Asia, and have been praised for their cultural and historical information relating to the character's adventures. Bosse mostly wrote historical fiction novels after the publication of The Warlord, which became a best-seller. The Warlord was set in China in the 1920s. He also won the Deutscher Jugendliteraturpreis in 1983.

Bosse was born in Detroit, Michigan and died in New York City. He is a graduate of Yale University and served in the U.S. Navy. Bosse was also an English teacher in City College of New York in Manhattan.

His novel Ganesh was adapted into the Canadian drama film Ordinary Magic in 1993.

== Bibliography ==
- Journey of Tao Kim Nam, 1959
- The Incident at Naha, 1972
- The Man Who Loved Zoos, 1974
- (Co-editor) The Flowering of the Novel, 1975
- The Seventy-nine Squares. New York: Thomas Y. Crowell. 1979. ISBN 0-690-03999-9.
- Cave beyond Time, (young adult) 1980
- Ganesh (young adult), 1981, reprinted under title Ordinary Magic, 1993
- The Barracuda Gang (young adult), New York: Dutton: Lodestar Books: 1982. ISBN 0-525-66737-7.
- The Warlord: A Novel. New York: Simon And Schuster. 1983. ISBN 0-671-44332-1
- Fire in Heaven New York: Simon and Schuster. 1985 ISBN 0-671-47080-9.
- Captives of Time, (young adult). New York: Delacorte Press: 1987. ISBN 0-385-29583-9.
- Stranger at the Gate, 1989
- Mister Touch, 1991
- The Vast Memory of Love, New York: Ticknor & Fields: 1992. ISBN 0-395-62943-8.
- Deep Dream of the Rain Forest (young adult), 1993
- The Examination (young adult), 1994
- Tusk and Stone, 1995
