= Guy Fournier =

Canadian author and screenwriter (born 1931)

- Born: July 23, 1931 (age 95); Waterloo, Quebec, Canada
- Occupations: Author, playwright, screenwriter
- Spouses: Louise Deschâtelets; Aimée Danis; Maryse Beauregard
- Children: 2
- Relatives: Claude Fournier (brother)
- Writing career
- Notable work: Two's a Crowd
- Notable awards: Order of Canada

Guy Fournier, CM (born 23 July 1931) is a Quebec author, playwright, and screenwriter. He was the creator of the well-known Quebec sitcom Two's a Crowd. From 8 September 2005 to 19 September 2006 he was chairman of the board of directors of the Canadian Broadcasting Corporation.

== Early life ==
Guy Fournier was born on 23 July 1931 in Waterloo, Quebec. He is the twin brother of Claude Fournier. They were the eldest two of six children.

== Career ==
Fournier was a writer on the TV show D'Iberville in the 1960s. He was the creator of the well-known 1970s Quebec sitcom Two's a Crowd (French: Jamais deux sans toi); he later said this was the series he worked on that he was proudest of. He also created the television series Peau de banane in the 1980s. He also wrote for several children's shows. He has written several books, and has also worked in filmmaking and communications, including as a journalist. He was awarded the Order of Canada on April 30, 1992.

From 8 September 2005 to 19 September 2006 he was chairman of the board of directors of the Canadian Broadcasting Corporation, succeeding Carole Taylor and acting chairman Robert Rabinovitch. In May 2006, he attracted a number of complaints after an appearance on the Quebec television show Tout le monde en parle in which he stated that at his age he enjoyed defecation more than sexual intercourse. In September 2006, Fournier penned a piece for the Quebec magazine 7 jours in which he sought to make a point about treatment of homosexuals in Lebanon, which included the line "In Lebanon, the law makes it possible for men to have sexual intercourse with animals as long as they are females. To do the same thing with male animals could lead to the death penalty." He apologized but this did not halt the criticism. On 19 September 2006, following these statements, Fournier resigned from his position as CBC chairman, which was accepted by Heritages Minister Bev Oda. Independent MP André Arthur was the only MP to denounce his resignation, and defended him, saying the response to Fournier's statements was a "sign of the immaturity of Canadian society", and Fournier had been treated unfairly.

As of 2020, he wrote a twice weekly column of opinions for Le Journal de Montréal and Le Journal de Québec. He is on the board of the Canada Media Fund. In 2020, he was seeking to write an autobiography, which he had struggled to finish for years. He finally finished and published it in 2023 as Jamais deux sans toi.

== Personal life ==
Fournier has been married five times. His first marriage was to a woman named Louis, with whom he had two sons, Éric and Christian. Louise died by suicide some time after giving Fournier custody. He then married actress Louise Deschâtelets, with whom he had a high profile relationship for 13 years before she divorced him. He later married and then divorced filmmaker Aimée Danis. He was also married to Alba, from Lebanon. As of 2020 he had been married to Maryse Beauregard for 20 years. According to Fournier, he remains on good terms with "three of my four ex-wives".

== Bibliography ==
- —— (1974). 80 fois: Une sélection de ses meilleures chronique (in Canadian French). Montreal: Inforcor. ISBN 0-88890-025-2.
- —— (1983). Vivre avec ma femmes (in Canadian French). Montreal: Editions Quebecor. ISBN 2-89089-257-3.
- —— (1993). Jamais deux sans toi: Soleil! maudit soleil! (in Canadian French). Montreal: VLB Editeur. ISBN 2-89005-540-X.
- —— (1996). Le Cercle de Mort: La Tragédie de l'Ordre du Temple Solaire (in Canadian French). Saint-Laurent: Édition du Club Québec loisirs. ISBN 2-89430-233-9.
- —— (1998). Écrire pour le petit écran (in Canadian French). Montreal: Éditions de l'Institut national de l'image et du Son. ISBN 2-9805992-0-4.
- —— (2000). Un homme au fourneau, Tome I (in Canadian French). Montreal: Les Éditions de l'Homme. ISBN 2-7619-1568-2.
- —— (2003). Le plus vieux métier du monde (in Canadian French). Trois-Pistoles. ISBN 2-89583-072-X.
- —— (2004). Un homme au fourneau, Tome II (in Canadian French). Montreal: Les Éditions de l'Homme. ISBN 2-7619-1985-8.
- —— (2004). Citron (in Canadian French). Montreal: Les Éditions de l'Homme. ISBN 2-7619-1981-5.
- —— (2023). Jamais deux sans moi (in Canadian French). Montreal: Les Éditions du Journal. ISBN 978-2-89761-203-0.

== Filmography ==
- D'Iberville (1968)
- La Mer mi-sel (1974)
- Jo Gaillard (TV series) (1975)
- Jamais deux sans toi (1977)
- Peau de banane (1982–1987)
- Maria Chapdelaine (1983)
- Ent'Cadieux
- Cœur à prendre (TV) (1994)
- My Friend Max (Mon amie Max) (1994)
- L'ombre de l'épervier
