= Richard Sargent =

American painter

- Born: 1911; Moline, Illinois, United States
- Died: 1978 or 1979; Andalusia, Spain
- Education: Moline Illinois Art School
- Occupations: Painter, muralist, illustrator
- Known for: magazine covers watercolors

Richard “Dick” Sargent (1911 – 1978 or 1979) was an American painter, muralist, and illustrator. He is best known for his illustrations for The Saturday Evening Post, Fortune, American Magazine, Photoplay and Woman's Day during the 1950s and early 1960s. In 1934, one of his works was selected by Eleanor Roosevelt for display at the White House.

== Early life and education ==
Richard Sargent was born in Moline, Illinois. His early career in art began shortly after his graduation from Moline High School. While working at a local printing and engraving plant, he attended night classes at the Moline Illinois Art School, which laid the foundation for his artistic career.

He later moved into professional artwork for advertising firms, working in advertising for over 20 years, starting in 1928. During this time, he further honed his skills by taking classes at both the Corcoran School of Art and the Phillips Memorial Gallery in Washington, D.C.

== Professional career ==
Sargent was first known as a watercolorist. He received early recognition in the fine art world when one of his watercolors was selected by Eleanor Roosevelt for display at the White House in 1934. The following year, another of his watercolors won a prize at the Corcoran Gallery of Art.

In 1939, Sargent was commissioned to create a mural for Morrilton, Arkansas, as a result of an Honorable Mention in a Section of Fine Arts Competition.

After working in advertising for two decades, Sargent established a solo career as an artist and illustrator. In 1951, he published his first cover for The Saturday Evening Post, "Truth about Santa". His family provided inspiration for some of his most successful artwork, depicting scenes of 1950s Baby Boomer households in everyday situations. His wife, Helen, and their redheaded son, Anthony, often served as models for the illustrations.

In the 1960s, illustrations were replaced by photos on magazine covers, which led Sargeant to retire in Andalusia, Spain.
