= Gavin Crawford's Wild West =

Canadian television special

- Genre: Comedy
- Created by: Gavin Crawford; Kyle Tingley
- Directed by: Jacob Tierney
- Starring: Gavin Crawford; Andrew Cheng; Anita Majumdar; Kaniehtiio Horn; Marypat Farrell
- Country of origin: Canada

Production
- Executive producers: Tom Cox; Gavin Crawford; David Fortier; Jordy Randall; Ivan Schneeberg; Kyle Tingley
- Production companies: SEVEN24 Films; Temple Street Productions

Original release
- Network: CBC
- Release: July 2013

Gavin Crawford's Wild West is a Canadian television special, which aired on CBC Television in July 2013. Wild West stars Gavin Crawford as six distinct characters, each representing a different aspect of the society of the Canadian province of Alberta, in a mockumentary format. The characters include:

- Katherine Adams, a pompous socialite in Calgary organizing a charity fundraiser;
- Lyle Carlyle-Chang, a gay cattle rancher in Cochrane resisting his husband Andy's (Andrew Cheng) suggestion that they revive the failing business by promoting it to tourists as a dude ranch;
- Donald Demchuck, a newly elected member of the Legislative Assembly of Alberta from Edmonton whose constituency assistant Liz (Anita Majumdar) is at her wit's end managing his incompetence;
- Jessica Jones, an Australian expatriate working as a massage therapist in Banff;
- Trevor Valgardson, a surly teenager in Taber whose widowed mother (Marypat Farrell) and uncle (Brendan Wall) are perennially exasperated with his delusion that he's a vampire;
- Conrad Whitehead, a trucker in Fort McMurray who is planning to break up with his girlfriend Shannon (Kaniehtiio Horn).

Originally announced as a planned series in 2011, it was left in limbo by funding cuts to the CBC in 2012, and only the pilot was completed although five more unfilmed episodes had been written before the CBC dropped the project. In 2014, Crawford told Toronto's NOW that he had explored the possibility of reviving the series for a different network, although no firm details were announced and no revival has taken place as of 2019.

The special garnered five Canadian Screen Award nominations at the 2nd Canadian Screen Awards, including nods for Best Comedy Series or Program, Best Actor in a Comedy Series or Program (Crawford) and Best Supporting Actor in a Comedy Series or Program (Cheng).
