= Johanne McKay =

Canadian actress

Johanne McKay (born May 21, 1974) is a Canadian actress. She is most noted for her performance in the film My Friend Max (Mon amie Max), for which she was a Genie Award nominee for Best Supporting Actress at the 15th Genie Awards in 1994.
