= Gavin Crawford =

Canadian comedian and actor

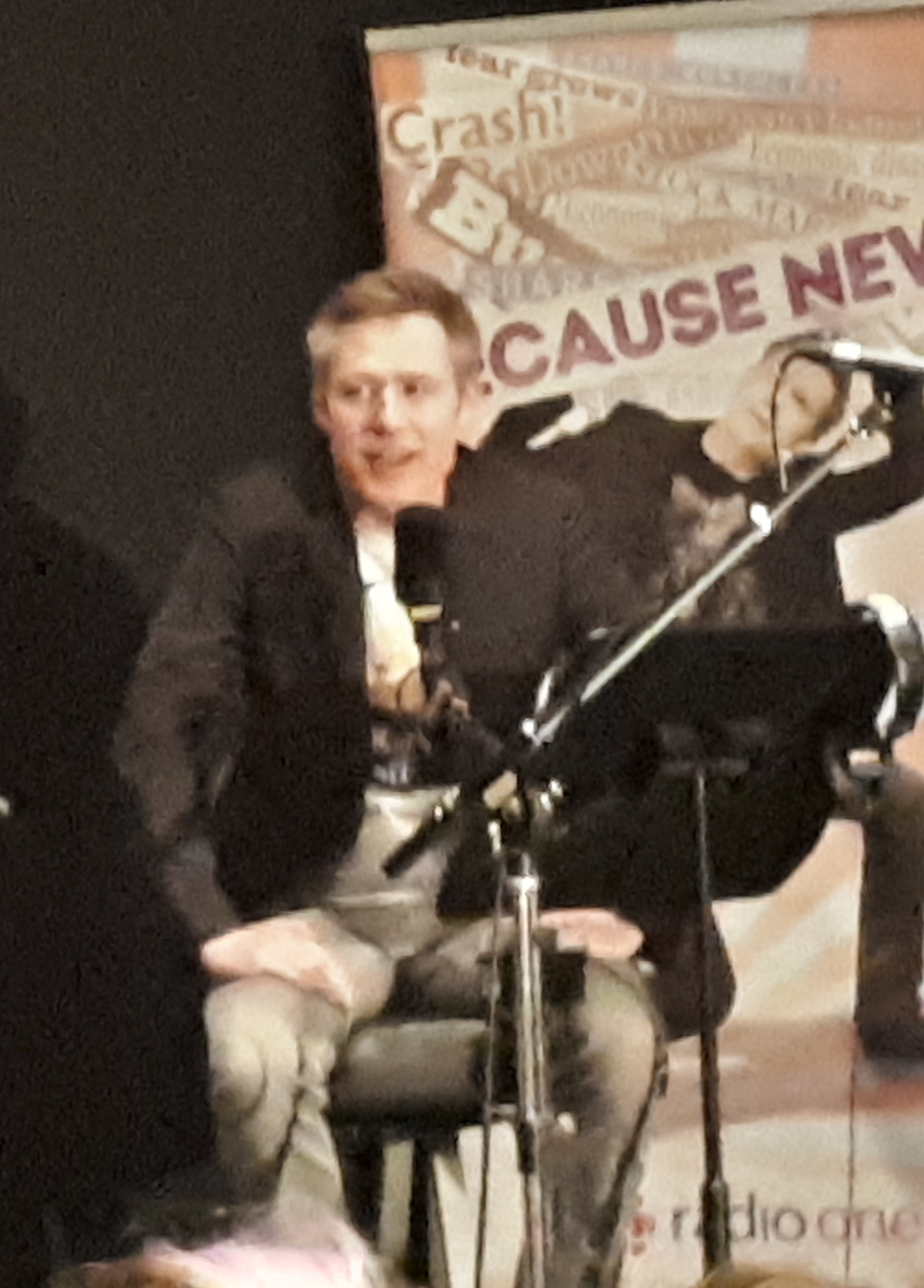
- Gavin Crawford on set during a taping of Because News in 2019
- Born: 2 April 1971 (age 55); Taber, Alberta, Canada
- Occupations: Actor, comedian
- Known for: This Hour Has 22 Minutes, The Gavin Crawford Show

Gavin Crawford (born 2 April 1971) is a Canadian comedian and actor, best known for The Gavin Crawford Show and This Hour Has 22 Minutes. He currently hosts the panel show, Because News, on CBC Radio One.

== Early life ==
Crawford was born in Taber, Alberta, Canada. He is a graduate of the BFA Acting Program at the University of British Columbia. He grew up in a Mormon family.

== Career ==
An alumnus of The Second City's Toronto company, Crawford is the creator, co-writer and co-star of the self-titled series, which ran for three seasons on The Comedy Network. In 2000 and 2001, he was also a cast member of the short-lived American sketch series Hype. In 2003, he joined the cast of This Hour Has 22 Minutes, filling in for Mary Walsh during her time away from the show. In 2004, Crawford was made a full-time cast member of This Hour Has 22 Minutes.

Crawford hosted the 2008 Canadian Screenwriting Awards and the Canadian version of How Do You Solve a Problem Like Maria?, which aired on CBC Television in the summer of 2008. Additionally, Crawford performed in guest appearances on Murdoch Mysteries, Made in Canada, Heartland, The Red Green Show and Corner Gas, and in the film French Immersion.

In 2013, Crawford participated in Salvatore Antonio's Truth/Dare: A Satire (With Dance), an interactive audience participation show which featured staged reenactments of scenes from Madonna's 1991 film Truth or Dare, at Buddies in Bad Times during Toronto's Pride Week. The show's cast also included Keith Cole and Adamo Ruggiero.

In 2014, he starred in Maureen Bradley's film Two 4 One as Adam, a trans man who winds up unexpectedly pregnant, and in the sitcom 24 Hour Rental as J.R.

Beginning in 2015, he is the host of the comedy news quiz series Because News on CBC Radio One.

In 2023, Crawford produced Let's Not Be Kidding, an autobiographical podcast about his relationship with his mother who is experiencing advancing Alzheimer's disease.

== Awards ==
Crawford was the recipient of the Tim Sims Encouragement Fund Award in 1998. He was nominated four times for a Gemini Award, which he won in December 2004 for his work on The Gavin Crawford Show (he was nominated twice in 2004, also for This Hour Has 22 Minutes). His comedy special Gavin Crawford's Wild West, which aired on CBC Television in 2013, garnered several Canadian Screen Award nominations at the 2nd Canadian Screen Awards, including a Best Actor in a Comedy Program or Series nod for Crawford.

=== Canadian Comedy Awards ===
Year	Award	Project
2003	Best Performance by a Male (Television)	The Gavin Crawford Show
2004	Best Individual Performance in a Comedy Series	This Hour Has 22 Minutes
2006	Best Ensemble Performance in a Comedy Series	This Hour Has 22 Minutes
2007	Television Writing (Special or Episode)	This Hour Has 22 Minutes
2008	Television Writing (Special or Episode)	This Hour Has 22 Minutes
2008	Best Performance by Actor in a Guest Role (Dramatic Series	Murdock Mysteries
2010	Best Ensemble Performance in a Comedy Series	This Hour Has 22 Minutes
2012	Best Performance by a Male (Film)	French Immersion

=== Canadian Screenwriting Awards ===
Year	Award	Project
2008	Best Script	This Hour Has 22 Minutes
2009	Best Script	This Hour Has 22 Minutes

=== Dora Mavor Moore Awards ===
Year	Award	Project
2011	Outstanding Performance Male	The Situationists
2013	Outstanding Performance Male	A Few Brittle Leaves

== Guest Roles ==
Crawford's television credits include guest appearances on Canadian programs such as "Corner Gas," "Robson Arms," "The Red Green Show," "CTV's Sonic Temple," "Made in Canada," "Heartland," and "Murdoch Mysteries." In fact, his remarkable portrayal in "Murdoch Mysteries" garnered him a Gemini Award for Best Guest Role in a dramatic series.

He appeared in feature films such as "My Dog Vincent," "The Five Senses," "Dead by Monday," "French Immersion," and "Portrait of a Serial Monogamist."

He also took on the role of host in CBC's adaptation of the British talent search program, "How Do You Solve a Problem Like Maria?".

== Personal life ==
Crawford is gay. He lives in Toronto with his husband Kyle Tingley.

== Theatre ==
- Rope Enough by Sky Gilbert as Ichabod Malframe, Buddies in Bad Times 2005
- Bad Acting Teachers by Sky Gilbert as Reginald Architruc, Buddies in Bad Times 2006
- A Few Brittle Leaves by Sky Gilbert as Viola Pie, Buddies in Bad Times 2013
