= Flora M'mbugu-Schelling =

Tanzanian documentary filmmaker

- Born: Tanzania
- Education: Tanzanian School of Journalism
- Occupation: documentary filmmaker
- Known for: her film These Hands.

Flora M'mbugu-Schelling is a Tanzanian documentary filmmaker, best known for her film These Hands.

== Life ==
Born in Tanzania, M'mbugu-Schelling studied at the Tanzanian School of Journalism before doing further study in Germany and France. Her debut film, Kumekucha (1987), won a gold medal at the New York International Film Festival. These Hands documents the work of Mozambican refugee women, breaking rocks in a quarry in Tanzania.

== Filmography ==
- Kumekucha [From Sun Up], 1987
- These Hands, 1992
- Shida and Matatizo, 1993
