= Kumekucha =

- Release dates: 1987
- Country: Tanzania

Kumekucha is a 1987 Tanzanian documentary produced and directed by Flora M'mbugu-Schelling.

== Plot ==
Women taken charge of their destiny by empowering themselves through education enabling them to make a difference in the society.
