= These Hands =

- Release dates: 1992
- Country: Tanzania

These Hands is a 1992 Tanzanian documentary produced and directed by Flora M'mbugu-Schelling.

== Plot ==
The film portrays the struggle of a Mozambican woman in a local mine, determined to make a difference despite all odds.
