= Phillip Barker (film director) =

Canadian artist, film director and production designer

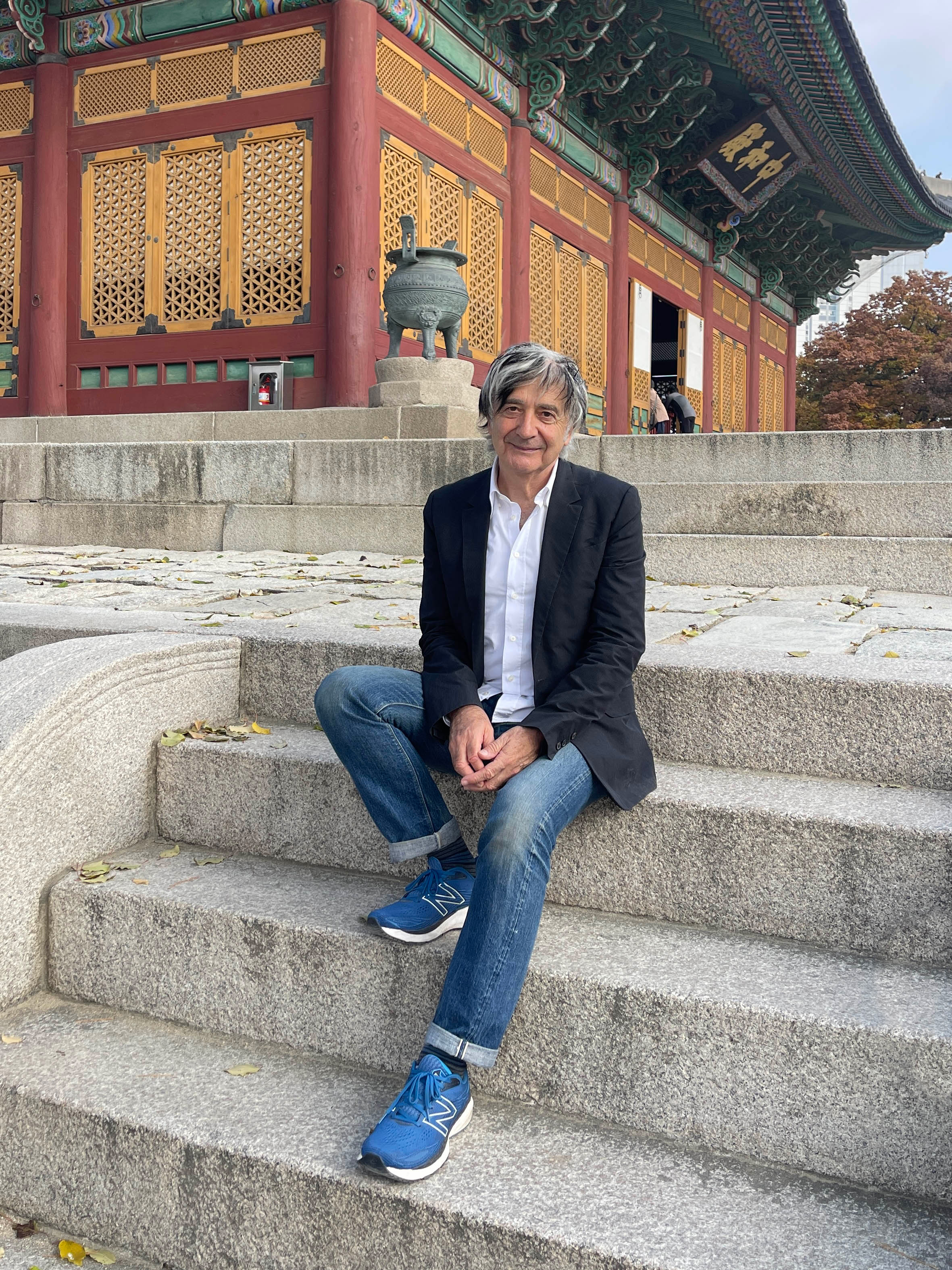
- Born: Bradford, Yorkshire, England
- Education: Ontario College of Art
- Known for: Production design, film direction, screenwriting, installation art
- Awards: Directors Guild of Canada Outstanding Achievement in Production Design 2006 Where the Truth Lies; Best Canadian Short Film at the Vancouver International Film Festival 2017 Shadow Nettes
- Website: phillipbarker.com

Phillip Barker is a Canadian artist, filmmaker, and production designer, based in Toronto, Ontario.

As a production designer, his work includes eleven feature films and two live operas with director Atom Egoyan. In 2006, Barker received a Directors Guild of Canada Award for Outstanding Achievement in Production Design for his work on Egoyan's Where the Truth Lies.

Barker's production design has also been featured in films by directors such as Brian De Palma, Mira Nair, Lisa Cholodenko and Neil LaBute and Adam Bernstein.

Recently a retrospective of his own films (written and directed by) was presented at the Clermont-Ferrand Film Festival, the Festival du nouveau cinéma, Toronto International Film Festival, the Kaohsiung Film Festival (Taiwan), the Danish Film Institute and the Canadian Film Institute. The retrospective was accompanied by a 200 page book Strange Machines, The Films of Phillip Barker by writer and film maker Mike Hoolboom.

EarthWorm, a new short film written and directed by Barker, and co-created with Seungwoo Park, won the Canadian Grand Prix at Regard film festival, and was selected as Canada's Top Ten by the Toronto International Film Festival, 2024.

== Early life ==
Phillip Barker was born in Bradford, Yorkshire, England. His father was an auto mechanic and his mother a nurse.

Barker's interest in filmmaking began in 1967, when his father brought home a Super-8 camera and projector. Barker's family moved to Canada the following year. His father had purchased the film camera to document the trip. He completed his high school education at Thomas A. Stewart Secondary School in Peterborough, Ontario, where his brother Mike was a founder of the city's Folk Under the Clock concert series.

He attended the Ontario College of Art, starting with commercial illustration, later transitioning to more experimental forms of art, including installation art that incorporated elements of film and video.

== Career ==
Barker spent a year and a half in Paris, before moving to Amsterdam, where he lived from 1982 to 1987, supporting himself by working as a scenic painter. In 1986, he debuted his performance piece titled Trust a Boat, 'Film-sculpture for a House' inside a canal house on the Keizersgracht. The performance was viewed from the street below as scenes were performed in nine windows of the three story building. These scenes consisted of a mixture of live performance and film projections set to music. Barker also served as production designer for the 1987 Dutch film Zoeken naar Eileen (Looking for Eileen), by director Rudolf van den Berg.

Upon his return to Canada, Barker continued to create installation pieces that incorporated elements of film, video, sculpture and live performance, often exhibited in public places. He also worked on commercials and rock videos to help support himself.

At the Seville Expo '92, Barker contributed an art piece to the Canadian pavilion. His work consisted of a flooded tent set up in the middle of a vast pond. Images of Canadian ecological disasters were projected onto the walls of the tent.

In 1995, Barker released the short film A Temporary Arrangement. The film won the Best Experimental Film Award at the 1996 Melbourne International Film Festival, and was also featured on TVOntario's two-part series Exposures: The Art of Film and Video, which aired in 2005. The film features composite images that were made by combining nine frames, all shot in Super 8 film and arranged into a grid that was then transferred to 35mm film.

Barker worked on Egoyan's stage production of Richard Strauss's opera Salome, presented by the Canadian Opera Company in 1996. Barker created elements of projected film and video for the performance. The first of many collaborations with Egoyan, the two met after Egoyan attended one of Barker's shows that was being held in an abandoned building once owned by the CBC. The work involved a delicate paper house that was suspended over a shallow pool of water and projected on the walls were black-and-white super 8 film images of various people floating on a river. Egoyan said of the experience: "Sometimes it just happens. You see a piece by a new artist and it answers something within you in a direct and powerful way. I had that experience nearly twenty-five years ago when I first came across Phillip's work." After the show, Egoyan left Barker a note in the show's guestbook, inviting Barker to work with him.

Barker and Egoyan next worked together on the film The Sweet Hereafter. Barker was nominated, along with Patricia Cuccia, in the category of Achievement in Art Direction/Production Design at the 18th Genie Awards for their work on the film. He also worked with Egoyan in 1997 on a film featuring cellist Yo-Yo Ma that aired as the fourth episode of the six-part television film series Inspired by Bach.

In 1998 Barker worked with director Mira Nair on the TV film rendition of the novel My Own Country, as well as with Egoyan on his production of the chamber opera Elsewhereless by Canadian composer Rodney Sharman. Barker also released his short film I am always connected, which used repurposed footage from an installation piece that he made for the Lumen Travo gallery in Amsterdam in 1984.

The following year he released his film Soul Cages, which features a grid of forty-five Super 8 film frames arranged into one frame of 35mm film—an expansion of the technique that he employed in A Temporary Arrangement. Soul Cages won best short film at The Atlantic Film Festival, Best Dramatic Short from the Canadian Society of Cinematographers and, with producer Simone Urdl, Barker shared a nomination for Best Live Action Short Film at the 21st Genie Awards.

The 2000s saw further collaborations between Barker and Egoyan. Barker was the production designer for the films Ararat (2002), Where the Truth Lies (2005), Adoration (2008) and Chloe (2009). Barker received Genie award nominations for his work on Ararat and Where the Truth Lies. In 2006 he was presented with a Directors Guild of Canada Award for Outstanding Achievement in Production Design for Where the Truth Lies. His work on the sets for the film were featured in an issue of Canadian Interiors magazine that same year. Barker built a 3,000-square-foot presidential suite at London's Shepperton Studios, inspired by the architecture and design of Morris Lapidus during his Miami Modern architecture period, for the film.

The Toronto International Film Festival included Barker's short film, Malody, in their list of Canada's Top Ten Short Films of 2012. In 2013 Malody received the Prix Créativité (creativity prize) at the Festival du nouveau cinéma in Montreal, in addition to the Le prix Hors Pistes (the "off-track" or "off-road" prize) at the Festival Hors Pistes held at the Centre Pompidou in Paris.

Barker served as production designer for the television series Reign from 2013 to 2015, as well as on the 2016 CBS series American Gothic. He was nominated, along with Robert Hepburn and Brad Milburn, for Best Production Design or Art Direction in a Fiction Program or Series for his work on Reign at the 2016 Canadian Screen Awards.

In 2017 Barker released his short film Shadow Nettes. In the film, a fisherman teaches his son about the use of the "shadow nette", a traditional fishing device worn by the fisherman that projects their silhouette on to a screen. Using their projected gestures, the fisherman draws prey to their nets. Shadow Nettes was featured at several film festivals internationally in 2017 and 2018 and won the prize for Best Canadian Short Film at the 2017 Vancouver International Film Festival. It was also featured on the CBC series 'Canadian Reflections.

Barker again collaborated with Egoyan on the film Guest of Honour, which was released in 2019. His work on the film earned him a nomination for Achievement in Art Direction / Production Design at the 2021 Canadian Screen Awards.

Also in 2019, Barker and fellow filmmaker Mike Hoolboom, launched a tour featuring a retrospective of Barker's films, titled Strange Machines: The Films of Phillip Barker. The tour also featured the release of a book by the same title that was edited by Hoolbloom. The retrospective was presented at the TIFF Bell Lightbox, the Canadian Film Institute, as well as the 2019 Clermont-Ferrand Film Festival in France.

Barker also sat on a panel of production designers at the 2019 Toronto International Film Festival, alongside François Audouy (The Wolverine, Logan, Ford v Ferrari), Craig Lathrop (The Lighthouse, The Witch), and Zosia Mackenzie (Castle in the Ground.)

In 2020, Barker served as production designer in the third season of Star Trek: Discovery. He was suggested to the show's executive producer, Alex Kurtzman, who had seen some of Barker's experimental films. He was also nominated for a Directors Guild of Canada award for Best Production Design – Dramatic Series, for his work on the show.

== Filmography ==
=== Film ===
==== As production designer ====
| Year | Film | Director | Notes |
|---|---|---|---|
| 1987 | Zoeken naar Eileen (Looking for Eileen) | Rudolf van den Berg | |
| 1997 | The Sweet Hereafter | Atom Egoyan | |
| 1997 | Bach Cello Suite #4: Sarabande | Atom Egoyan | Short film, later televised |
| 2000 | Ararat | Atom Egoyan | |
| 2004 | Cavedweller | Lisa Cholodenko | |
| 2005 | Where the Truth Lies | Atom Egoyan | |
| 2005 | The River King | Nick Willing | |
| 2006 | The Wicker Man | Neil LaBute | |
| 2007 | Redacted | Brian De Palma | |
| 2008 | Camille | Gregory Mackenzie | |
| 2008 | Adoration | Atom Egoyan | |
| 2009 | Chloe | Atom Egoyan | |
| 2011 | Breakaway | Robert Lieberman | |
| 2013 | Cottage Country | Peter Wellington | |
| 2013 | Devil's Knot | Atom Egoyan | |
| 2014 | The Captive | Atom Egoyan | |
| 2017 | Perfect Citizen | Paris Barclay | TV movie |
| 2019 | Guest of Honour | Atom Egoyan | |
| 2023 | Seven Veils | Atom Egoyan | |

==== As director ====
| Year | Film | Notes |
|---|---|---|
| 1984 | I Am Always Connected | Short film |
| 1996 | A Temporary Arrangement | Short film |
| 1999 | Soul Cages | Short film |
| 2003 | Regarding | Short film |
| 2008 | Night Vision | Short film |
| 2010 | Slow Blink | TV short |
| 2010 | Little Films About Big Moments | One in a series of short films |
| 2012 | Malody | Video short |
| 2015 | Dredger | Short film |
| 2017 | Shadow Nettes | Short film |
| 2024 | EarthWorm | Short film |

=== Television ===
| Year | Film | Creator(s) | Notes |
|---|---|---|---|
| 2013-15 | Reign | Laurie McCarthy and Stephanie SenGupta | |
| 2016 | American Gothic | Corinne Brinkerhoff | |
| 2020 | Star Trek: Discovery | Bryan Fuller and Alex Kurtzman | Season 3 |
| 2021 | The Sinner | Derek Simonds | Season 4 |

== Awards and nominations ==
| Year | Award | Category | Nominated work | Result |
|---|---|---|---|---|
| 1996 | Melbourne International Film Festival | Best Short Experimental | A Temporary Arrangement | Won |
| 1997 | Genie Award | Best Achievement in Art Direction/Production Design (shared with Patricia Cuccia) | The Sweet Hereafter | Nominated |
| 2001 | Genie Award | Best Live Action Short Drama (shared with Simone Urdl) | Soul Cages | Nominated |
| 2003 | DCG Team Award | Outstanding Achievement in a Feature Film (shared with film crew) | Ararat | Nominated |
| 2003 | Genie Award | Best Achievement in Art Direction/Production Design | Ararat | Nominated |
| 2006 | Genie Award | Best Achievement in Art Direction/Production Design (shared with Carolyn 'Cal' Loucks) | Where the Truth Lies | Nominated |
| 2006 | DCG Team Award | Outstanding Achievement in a Feature Film (shared with film crew) | Where the Truth Lies | Won |
| 2009 | DCG Craft Award | Production Design - Feature | Adoration | Nominated |
| 2010 | DCG Team Award | Outstanding Achievement in a Feature Film (shared with film crew) | Chloe | Nominated |
| 2010 | DCG Craft Award | Outstanding Achievement in Production Design - Feature Film | Chloe | Nominated |
| 2012 | Bratislava International Film Festival | Best Short Film | Malody | Won |
| 2013 | Montréal Festival of New Cinema | Creativity Prize | Malody | Won |
| 2015 | Canadian Screen Award | Achievement in Art Direction/Production Design | The Captive | Nominated |
| 2017 | Vancouver International Film Festival | Best Canadian Short | Shadow Nettes | Won |
| 2018 | Canadian Screen Award | Best Production Design or Art Direction in a Fiction Program or Series (shared with Aidan Leroux, Joel Richardson and Rob Hepburn) | Reign | Nominated |
| 2019 | DCG Craft Award | Outstanding Achievement in Production Design - Feature Film | Guest of Honour | Nominated |
| 2021 | Canadian Screen Award | Achievement in Art Direction/Production Design | Guest of Honour | Nominated |
| 2021 | DCG Craft Award | Outstanding Achievement in Production Design - Dramatic Series | Star Trek: Discovery | Nominated |

== Bibliography ==
- Hoolboom, Mike, ed. (2018). Strange Machines: The Films of Phillip Barker (PDF). Phillip Barker and Pleasure Dome. ISBN 978-1-9994252-0-3.
