= Paul Sarossy =

Canadian cinematographer and film director

- Born: April 24, 1963 (age 63); Barrie, Ontario, Canada
- Education: York University
- Occupations: Cinematographer, film director
- Years active: 1989-present
- Spouse: Geraldine O'Rawe
- Parent: Ivan Sarossy (father)
- Awards: Genie Award for Best Achievement in Cinematography; 1994 Exotica; 1997 The Sweet Hereafter; 1999 Felicia's Journey
- Website: paulsarossy.com

Paul Sarossy, CSC, BSC, ASC (born April 24, 1963) is a Canadian cinematographer and film director. He is known for his collaborations with director Atom Egoyan, serving as his director of photography on fourteen feature films (Speaking Parts, The Adjuster, Exotica, The Sweet Hereafter, Felicia's Journey, Ararat, Where the Truth Lies, Adoration, Chloe, Devil's Knot, The Captive, Remember, Guest of Honour, and Seven Veils).

He has won five Genie Awards for Best Achievement in Cinematography, a Gemini Award, and five Canadian Society of Cinematographers awards, as well as being nominated for a Primetime Emmy Award and an Independent Spirit Award. He made his directorial debut with the British crime drama Mr In-Between, which premiered at the Toronto International Film Festival in 2001, and received a British general release in 2003.

Sarossy is married to the Northern Irish actress Geraldine O'Rawe. He is the son of Hungarian-born cinematographer Ivan Sarossy. He is a member of the Canadian, British, and American Society of Cinematographers. He has cited the work of cinematographers Vittorio Storaro, Sven Nykvist, and Néstor Almendros and director Bernardo Bertolucci as an overarching influence on his oeuvre.

== Filmography ==
=== Film ===
Year	Title	Notes
1988	Revenge of the Radioactive Reporter	
1989	Speaking Parts	
1989	Odyssey in August	Short film
1990	Terminal City Ricochet	
1990	White Room	
1991	The Adjuster	
1991	Montreal Stories	Segment: "En passant"
1991	Masala	
1993	Love & Human Remains	
1993	Ordinary Magic	
1994	Exotica	Genie Award for Best Achievement in Cinematography; CSC Award for Best Cinematography in Theatrical Feature
1994	Satie and Suzanne	Short film
1995	Blood and Donuts	
1996	Lulu	
1996	Mariette in Ecstasy	Unreleased film
1997	Picture Perfect	
1997	Affliction	Valladolid Festival Award for Best Director of Photography; Nominated- Independent Spirit Award for Best Cinematography
1997	The Sweet Hereafter	Genie Award for Best Achievement in Cinematography; Csapnivalo Golden Slate for Best Cinematography; Valladolid Festival Award for Best Director of Photography; Nominated- Boston Society of Film Critics Award for Best Cinematography; Nominated- Los Angeles Film Critics Association Award for Best Cinematography
1998	Jerry and Tom	
1998	Pete's Meteor	
1999	Felicia's Journey	Genie Award for Best Achievement in Cinematography; Valladolid Festival Award for Best Director of Photography; Nominated- CSC Award for Best Cinematography in Theatrical Feature
2000	Lakeboat	
2000	Duets	
2000	The Line	Short film
2001	On the Nose	
2001	Mr In-Between	Also director Cinequest Maverick Spirit Award for Best Feature; Cognac Festival New Blood Award for Best Debut Feature; Raindance Jury Award for UK Feature Nominated- Douglas Hickox Award; Nominated- Tokyo Grand Prix
2002	Paid in Full	
2002	Perfect Pie	Genie Award for Best Achievement in Cinematography
2002	Ararat	
2003	Soldier's Girl	
2003	The Snow Walker	Co-cinematographer with David Connell
2004	Head in the Clouds	Genie Award for Best Achievement in Cinematography; CSC Award for Best Cinematography in Theatrical Feature
2005	The River King	
2005	Ripley Under Ground	
2005	Where the Truth Lies	
2006	The Wicker Man	CSC Award for Best Cinematography in Theatrical Feature
2006	One Way	
2007	Charlie Bartlett	
2007	All Hat	
2007	The Secret	
2008	The Deal	
2008	Adoration	
2009	Chloe	Nominated- CSC Award for Best Cinematography in Theatrical Feature; Nominated- Chlotrudis Award for Best Cinematography
2010	Act of Dishonour	
2010	The Devil's Delight	Short film
2010	The Duel	Nominated- CSC Award for Best Cinematography in Theatrical Feature
2013	Devil's Knot	
2014	The Captive	
2015	Remember	Nominated- Camerimage Golden Frog; Nominated- CSC Award for Best Cinematography in Theatrical Feature
2016	Goon: Last of the Enforcers	
2017	Don't Talk to Irene	
2018	The Padre	Nominated- Canadian Screen Award for Best Cinematography
2019	Guest of Honour	
2023	Irena's Vow	
2023	Seven Veils	
2024	Longing	
2024	The Silent Planet	

=== Television ===
==== Television series ====
Year	Title	Notes
1994-95	Picture Windows	Miniseries; 2 episodes Nominated- ASC Award for Outstanding Cinematography in Limited Series
2009	The Listener	Episode: "A Voice in the Dark"
2010	Death Comes to Town	Miniseries; 8 episodes Gemini Award for Best Photography in a Comedy or Variety Programme
2011	Flashpoint	Episode: "The Better Man"
2011-13	The Borgias	24 episodes Canadian Screen Award for Best Photography in a Dramatic Programme; CSC Award for Best Cinematography in a Television Drama; Nominated- Primetime Emmy Award for Outstanding Cinematography; Nominated- BSC Award for Best Cinematography in a Television Drama
2012	Copper	10 episodes
2013-16	Reign	37 episodes

==== Television films ====
Year	Title	Notes
1991	Grand Larceny	
1995	Dark Eyes	Failed pilot
1996	Mistrial	
1999	Rocky Marciano	CSC Award for Best Cinematography in a Television Drama
2000	Rated X	
2000	Krapp's Last Tape	
2002	The Man Who Saved Christmas	
2002	No Night Is Too Long	
2003	Martha, Inc	
2003	The Incredible Mrs. Ritchie	
2004	The Survivors Club	
2004	Suburban Madness	
2005	Black Widow	Nominated- Gemini Award for Best Photography in a Comedy or Variety Programme
2006	Eight Days to Live	
2007	Pictures of Hollis Woods	
2010	Abroad	
2018	Her Stolen Past	

== Awards and nominations ==
Year	Association	Category	Work	Result
1994	Canadian Society of Cinematographers	Best Cinematography in Theatrical Feature	Exotica	Won
1994	Academy of Canadian Cinema & Television	Best Achievement in Cinematography	Exotica	Won
1996	American Society of Cinematographers	Outstanding Achievement in Cinematography in Mini-Series	Picture Windows	Nominated
1997	Boston Society of Film Critics	Best Cinematography	The Sweet Hereafter	Nominated
1997	Los Angeles Film Critics Association	Best Cinematography	The Sweet Hereafter	Nominated
1997	Academy of Canadian Cinema & Television	Best Achievement in Cinematography	The Sweet Hereafter	Won
1997	Independent Spirit Awards	Best Cinematography	Affliction	Nominated
1997	Valladolid International Film Festival	Best Director of Photography	The Sweet Hereafter; Affliction	Won
1999	Canadian Society of Cinematographers	Best Cinematography in TV Drama	Rocky Marciano	Won
1999	Canadian Society of Cinematographers	Best Cinematography in Theatrical Feature	Felicia's Journey	Nominated
1999	Valladolid International Film Festival	Best Director of Photography	Felicia's Journey	Won
2000	Academy of Canadian Cinema & Television	Best Achievement in Cinematography	Felicia's Journey	Won
2001	Tokyo International Film Festival	Grand Prix	Mr. In-Between	Nominated
2002	Cinequest Film Festival	Maverick Spirit Award	Mr. In-Between	Won
2002	Raindance Film Festival	Jury Prize for UK Feature	Mr. In-Between	Won
2002	Festival du Film Policier de Cognac	New Blood Award	Mr. In-Between	Won
2002	British Independent Film Awards	Douglas Hickox Award	Mr. In-Between	Nominated
2003	Academy of Canadian Cinema & Television	Best Achievement in Cinematography	Perfect Pie	Won
2004	Canadian Society of Cinematographers	Kodak New Century Award	—N/a	Won
2005	Canadian Society of Cinematographers	Best Cinematography in Theatrical Feature	Head in the Clouds	Won
2005	Academy of Canadian Cinema & Television	Best Achievement in Cinematography	Head in the Clouds	Won
2006	DVD Exclusive Awards	Best Cinematography in a DVD Premiere Feature	The Snow Walker	Won
2006	Academy of Canadian Cinema & Television	Best Photography in a Comedy, Variety or Performing Arts Program	Black Widow	Nominated
2007	Canadian Society of Cinematographers	Best Cinematography in Theatrical Feature	The Wicker Man	Won
2010	Canadian Society of Cinematographers	Best Cinematography in Theatrical Feature	Chloe	Nominated
2010	Canadian Society of Cinematographers	Best Cinematography in Theatrical Feature	The Duel	Nominated
2010	Academy of Canadian Cinema & Television	Best Photography in a Comedy, Variety or Performing Arts Program	Death Comes to Town	Won
2011	Academy of Television Arts & Sciences	Primetime Emmy Award for Outstanding Cinematography for a Single-Camera Series	The Borgias	Nominated
2013	Academy of Canadian Cinema & Television	Best Photography in a Dramatic Programme	The Borgias	Won
2013	British Society of Cinematographers	Best Cinematography in a Television Drama	The Borgias	Nominated
2013	Canadian Society of Cinematographers	Best Cinematography in TV Drama	The Borgias	Won
2014	Academy of Canadian Cinema & Television	Best Photography in a Dramatic Programme	The Borgias	Nominated
2015	Canadian Society of Cinematographers	Best Cinematography in Theatrical Feature	Remember	Nominated
2016	Camerimage Festival	Golden Frog	Remember	Nominated
2016	Camerimage Festival	Cinematographer-Director Duo Award	—N/a	Won
2019	Academy of Canadian Cinema & Television	Best Cinematography	The Padre	Nominated

2022 Canadian Society of Cinematographers Best Cinematography in 1/2 hour television "Guilty Party" (won)
