= Soul Cages (film) =

1999 Canadian short film

- Directed by: Phillip Barker
- Written by: Phillip Barker
- Produced by: Simone Urdl
- Starring: Susanna Hood; Srinivas Krishna
- Cinematography: Luc Montpellier
- Edited by: Jeff Bessner
- Music by: Tom Third
- Distributed by: The Film Farm
- Release date: September 15, 1999 (TIFF)
- Running time: 23 minutes
- Country: Canada
- Language: English

Soul Cages is a Canadian short drama film, directed by Phillip Barker and released in 1999. Inspired by the old legend of The Soul Cages, in which the souls of drowned sailors are trapped in clay pots at the bottom of the ocean, the film adapts it to the present day by depicting the interactions between a photographer (Susanna Hood) and the clerk (Srinivas Krishna) processing her film in a one-hour photo lab, around the philosophical question of whether the souls of photographic subjects are trapped in the image.

The film premiered at the 1999 Toronto International Film Festival. It was later screened at the Local Heroes Film Festival in Winnipeg, where it won the Audience Choice Award, and at the 2000 Atlantic Film Festival, where it won the award for Best Canadian Short Film.

It received a Genie Award nomination for Best Live Action Short Drama at the 21st Genie Awards in 2001, and Luc Montpellier won the Canadian Society of Cinematographers award for Best Cinematography in a Dramatic Short in 2000.

It was part of a retrospective screening of Barker's short films in 2018, in conjunction with the publication of Mike Hoolboom's book Strange Machines: The Films of Phillip Barker. The other films in the series were I Am Always Connected, A Temporary Arrangement, Malody, Regarding, Dredger and Shadow Nettes. The series was screened in 2018 at FNC and the TIFF Bell Lightbox, and in 2019 at the Clermont-Ferrand International Short Film Festival.
