= Robert Lantos =

Hungarian-Canadian film producer (born 1949)

Robert Lantos CM
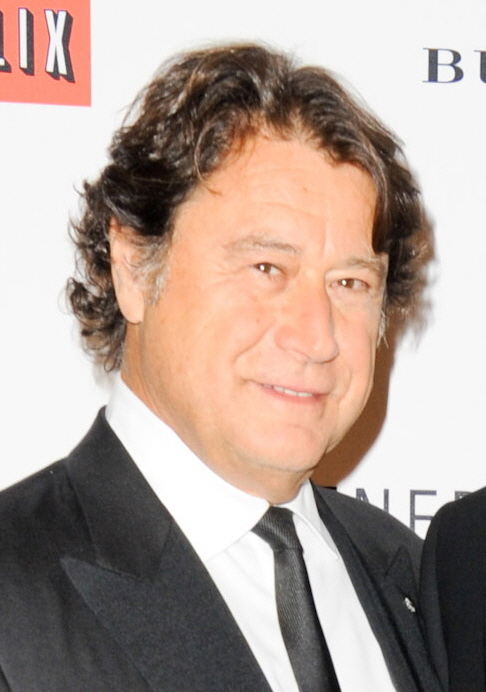
- Lantos at the 2013 Canadian Film Centre Annual Gala & Auction
- Born: 3 April 1949 (age 77); Budapest, Hungary
- Citizenship: Canadian, Hungarian
- Education: McGill University (BA and MA – literature)
- Occupation: Film producer
- Spouse: Jennifer Dale (divorced)
- Children: 2
- Awards: Order of Canada

Robert Lantos CM (born 3 April 1949) is a Hungarian-Canadian film producer.

== Life and career ==
Lantos was born on 3 April 1949 in Budapest, the son of Ágnes (Bodor) and László Lantos, a mechanic and truck company owner. Lantos spent much of his childhood in Montevideo, Uruguay, where his family fled after the Hungarian Revolution of 1956. He immigrated to Canada in 1963. Lantos is Jewish.

Lantos studied literature at McGill University in Montreal and graduated with a BA (1970) and an MA (1972). Following graduation from McGill, he founded Vivafilm which imported and distributed foreign films across Canada. He later started a production company, RSL Entertainment, which produced fifteen films, most notably George Kaczender's In Praise of Older Women and Ted Kotcheff's Joshua Then and Now.

Lantos co-founded the Canadian film and television company Alliance Communications Corporation with partners Victory Loewy, John Kemeny, Stephen J. Roth, and Denis Héroux. He was chairman and CEO until 1998 when he sold his controlling interest in Alliance. He now produces films through his production company Serendipity Point Films.

Lantos has produced 40 feature films. His credits include the Golden Globe Winner and Academy Award nominated Barney's Version; Golden Globe nominated and Academy Award nominated Eastern Promises; Fugitive Pieces, winner, Best Actor at the Rome Film Festival and winner of the Audience Award at the Sydney Film Festival; Golden Globe-nominated and Academy Award-nominated Being Julia; Golden Globe nominated Sunshine; the Cannes Grand Prix winner and Academy Award nominated The Sweet Hereafter; Berlin Silver Bear winner Existenz; Cannes Ecumenical Prize winner Adoration; Cannes Special Jury Prize winner Crash; Cannes International Critics Prize winner Exotica; Genie Award winners Where the Truth Lies, Black Robe, In Praise of Older Women; and Canadian domestic box office phenomenon Men with Brooms. Another five of his films have been a part of the Cannes Official Selection: Night Magic (1985), Joshua Then and Now (1985, in competition), Felicia's Journey (1999, in competition), Stardom (2000, Closing Night), Ararat (2002), Where the Truth Lies (2005, in competition).

His television credits include the drama series: Due South, Power Play, North of 60, Counterstrike, E.N.G, Night Heat, Bordertown, and 25 made-for-television movies.

Lantos is a member of the Order of Canada and holds an honorary Doctor of Letters from McGill University. He has served on the board of directors of the Canadian Broadcasting Corporation, the Toronto International Film Festival, Indigo Books and Music, the Canadian Film Centre, and the Academy of Canadian Cinema and Television, of which he is a past chairman. He received the Academy of Canadian Film and Television's Air Canada Award for Outstanding Contribution to the Business of Filmmaking in Canada in 1991, the Canadian Film and Television Producers Association Chetwynd Award for Entrepreneurial Excellence, and the Ontario Region's Entrepreneur of the Year Award in 1995. He is also a recipient of the Royal Canadian Academy of the Arts Award, and The Toronto Arts Award. He is an inductee to the Canadian Film and Television Hall of Fame. He is a member of the Academy of Motion Picture Arts and Sciences, British Academy of Film and Television Arts, and the European Film Academy.

At the 2015 Toronto International film Festival, the Canadian Media Production Association announced that Lantos had won 10th annual Feature Film Producer's Award.

== Filmography as producer ==
For a complete list of credits see:

=== Motion picture credits ===
- The Angel and the Woman (L'Ange et la femme) (1977)
- In Praise of Older Women (1978)
- Agency (1980)
- Suzanne (1980)
- Your Ticket Is No Longer Valid (1981)
- Paradise (1982)
- Scandale (1982)
- Bedroom Eyes (1984)
- Heavenly Bodies (1984)
- Night Magic (1985)
- Joshua Then and Now (1985)
- Sword of Gideon - executive producer (1986)
- Separate Vacations (1986)
- Black Robe (1991)
- On My Own – executive producer (1992)
- Léolo – executive producer (1992)
- Johnny Mnemonic (1995)
- Never Talk to Strangers (1995)
- Crash (1996)
- The Sweet Hereafter (1997)
- Existenz (1999)
- Felicia's Journey (1999)
- Sunshine (1999)
- Stardom (2000)
- Men with Brooms (2002)
- Ararat (2002)
- The Statement (2003)
- Being Julia (2004)
- Where the Truth Lies (2005)
- Fugitive Pieces (2007)
- Adoration (2008)
- Eastern Promises (2007)
- Barney's Version (2010)
- The Right Kind of Wrong (2012)
- Remember (2015)
- The Song of Names (2019)
- Crimes of the Future (2022)

=== Television credits ===
- Bordertown (78 episodes, Family Channel, 1988–1994)
- Night Heat (96 episodes, CBS, 1985–1989)
- E.N.G. (96 episodes, 1988–1994)
- Counterstrike (66 episodes, USA Network, 1990–1993)
- North of 60 (90 episodes, 1994–1998)
- Power Play (26 episodes, 1998–2000)
- Due South (68 episodes, CBS, 1994–1998)
- Rise of the Raven (10 episodes, 2025)
