= Chloe (2009 film) =

2009 erotic thriller film

- US theatrical release poster
- Directed by: Atom Egoyan
- Screenplay by: Erin Cressida Wilson
- Based on: Nathalie... by Anne Fontaine
- Produced by: Joe Medjuck; Jeffrey Clifford; Ivan Reitman
- Starring: Julianne Moore; Liam Neeson; Amanda Seyfried; Max Thieriot
- Cinematography: Paul Sarossy
- Edited by: Susan Shipton
- Music by: Mychael Danna
- Production companies: The Montecito Picture Company; StudioCanal
- Distributed by: Sony Pictures Classics (United States); E1 Distribution (Canada); StudioCanal (France)
- Release dates: September 13, 2009 (TIFF); March 10, 2010 (France); March 26, 2010 (United States and Canada)
- Running time: 96 minutes
- Countries: United States; Canada; France
- Language: English
- Budget: $12–14 million
- Box office: $13.6 million

Chloe is a 2009 erotic thriller film directed by Atom Egoyan, a reimagining of the 2003 French film Nathalie.... It stars Julianne Moore, Liam Neeson, and Amanda Seyfried in the title role. Its screenplay was written by Erin Cressida Wilson, based on the earlier French film, written by Anne Fontaine.

Chloe premiered at the 2009 Toronto International Film Festival on September 13, 2009, before being released on March 10, 2010 in France and March 26, 2010 in the United States and Canada. Despite receiving mixed reviews from critics, the film grossed $13.6 million worldwide and broke Egoyan personal box office records, and the film eventually became a commercial success by capitalizing on additional revenue streams.

== Plot ==
Catherine is a gynecologist, her husband David is a college professor, and they have a teenage son, Michael. Catherine suspects David of having an affair after she sees a cell-phone picture of him with a female student.

At a restaurant, Catherine encounters a young woman named Chloe and realizes she is a call girl. One day, she notices Chloe from her office window, entering an upscale bar, and surmises that they work in the same neighborhood. Chloe goes to the bar to meet clients. Catherine goes there to meet Chloe and tells her that she wants to hire her to test David's loyalty. Catherine gave Chloe information about her husband.

Chloe reports back that David kissed her, saddening Catherine. Chloe and David's relationship develops sexually, and Catherine asks that Chloe show her the results of her tests for sexually transmitted diseases. Chloe brings the test results to Catherine's office, where she meets Michael and flirts with him.

Catherine and Chloe meet multiple times, and Chloe describes in explicit detail her sexual encounters with David, which arouses Catherine. During a meeting at a hotel where Chloe says she had a tryst with David, Chloe kisses Catherine. Catherine, surprised by this, abruptly leaves. Later, she is taken aback by David's awareness of the scent of her lotion; it is the same lotion that Chloe wears. Upset by this, Catherine leaves and meets with Chloe again at a hotel, where she asks how David touches her. Realizing that she is heartbroken, Chloe consoles Catherine, leading to a sexual encounter.

Catherine gets home very late, leading David to ask if she has been unfaithful. Catherine tells him he has been unfaithful as well, and the two argue. Chloe confronts Catherine and tells her what they shared together is real, but Catherine insists their relationship was a business transaction and asks her to please leave. She calls off their relationship, but when Chloe mentions that David called Chloe again, Catherine decides to settle this once and for all: she calls Chloe to meet at a coffee house, where she also calls David. David arrives first, and she angrily demands that he admit he is having an affair. Chloe walks in, and it is clear that David does not recognize her. Chloe quickly leaves without speaking to either of them, and Catherine realizes that Chloe made up all the stories of her encounters with David.

David admits that he has flirted and been tempted but has never been unfaithful to her. Upset, Catherine reveals everything about Chloe and that they slept together. She apologizes, saying that she felt she had become invisible to David as she aged, while David became more attractive to her. David comforts and kisses her, and the couple reconciles.

Chloe goes to Catherine's house and has sex with Michael in Catherine's bed. Catherine arrives home, and Chloe tells Catherine that she is in love with her and that she only had sex with Michael because Michael reminds her of Catherine. She threatens to hurt Catherine, requesting a kiss, and Catherine complies. Michael sees them, startling Catherine and causing her to push Chloe through the bedroom window. Chloe grabs hold of the window frame but intentionally lets go and falls to her death. Sometime later, at Michael's graduation party, Catherine is seen wearing Chloe's hairpin; the family is seemingly reconciled.

== Cast ==
- Julianne Moore as Dr. Catherine Stewart, a gynecologist, David's wife, and Chloe's love interest
- Liam Neeson as David Stewart, a college professor and Catherine's husband
- Amanda Seyfried as Chloe Sweeney, a call girl who Catherine hires to expose David but instead falls in love with Catherine
- Max Thieriot as Michael Stewart, Catherine and David's son
- R. H. Thomson as Frank
- Nina Dobrev as Anna
- Meghan Heffern as Miranda
- Natalie Lisinska as Eliza
- Laura de Carteret as Alicia
- Mishu Vellani as Julie

== Production ==
Chloe was the first film produced by the director Atom Egoyan that was not written by him.

The film, shot in only 35 days, was financed solely in France and was shot in Toronto and Lake Ontario, Canada. Some local restaurants and scenic spots appear in the film under actual names, such as Allan Gardens, Cafe Diplomatico, The Rivoli, the Windsor Arms Hotel, the Royal York Hotel, the Royal Ontario Museum, The Royal Conservatory of Music, the CN Tower, the Art Gallery of Ontario and the Ontario College of Art.

Producer Jason Reitman helped persuade Amanda Seyfried to star in this film. Seyfried accepted the role of Chloe after a friend of hers withdrew from consideration due to discomfort with the nudity. Julianne Moore described Seyfried as a "very dependable" acting partner and claimed that they were largely comfortable with the intimacy in the film. In describing her view of Catherine's relationship with Chloe, Moore noted "an emotional quality to their intimacy that has to do with their conversation and their basic receptivity to one another. Now what they turn into personally obviously is very different. They are having completely subjective experiences, but that doesn't mean [they're] not incredibly receptive to one another and it clearly creates something in-between them. And that's what love and sex and intimacy and all that is. Someone who is listening to you, hearing you, there for you, that's the person you end up having a relationship with, sexual or just emotional or whatever. I don't know if that has to do with gender necessarily".

Liam Neeson's wife, Natasha Richardson, had a skiing accident during filming. Neeson decided to leave the set to take care of Richardson, who died from her injury a few days later. The filmmakers re-arranged the shooting schedule accordingly for Neeson's absence. Just a few days after Richardson's death, Neeson returned to the set and filmed the remainder of his scenes in two days. Canadian indie rock band Raised by Swans has two songs featured in the movie and the band is mentioned several times by Chloe.

Anne Fontaine, the writer/director of Nathalie..., said that she was interested in Egoyan's take on it. Fontaine also said that she was not happy with Nathalie... because the two lead actresses of the film objected to her original intention for a lesbian relationship to develop between their characters.

Atom Egoyan studied at the University of Toronto, and Joe Medjuck, one of the film's producers, was a teacher of Egoyan at the University of Toronto.

== Behind the scenes ==
=== Creative process ===
After determining the plan for the remake of the film Nathalie..., the investor StudioCanal believed that it was necessary to find a reliable screenwriter to write a script for the film because it tells a relatively complicated family and emotional story. Erin Cressida Wilson was chosen, in part because of her experience writing erotic films such as Secretary (2002). This script took Wilson a lot of time and energy to create, and many times she couldn't figure out what real life was and what was the story in the script. Wilson found it easier to write for Chloe than for Catherine, later saying, "I related to Chloe, the young woman who loved to seduce people".

=== Cinematography ===
Chloe's director Egoyan insisted on using 35 mm film to shoot the film. This is a time-consuming and labor-intensive process, but Egoyan enjoys it. The cinematographer Paul Sarossy thinks filming this film is symbolic. In this digital age, choosing to use film to shoot a movie is more of a feeling of escape from digital electronics. Although the film eventually uses some digital technology, it is not a digitally produced film.

=== Costume design ===
The film also took great pains in the art design and costume design. In the movie, mirrors and glass were used as props for reflection and refraction. The costume design of the film also pays attention to the concept of mirroring. In order to complement the artwork, costume designer Debra Hanson specifically used a layered mirror effect on the costume design. Those repeated laces, structures and decorations are also mirrored images. The effect is the same as showing the heart of a character. In addition, the relationship between clothing and the external environment has also been deliberately taken care of. In the film, Chloe's scene in the greenhouse was decorated with a lot of leaves and patterns on the clothes she wore, which could reflect some of her inner unrest. Similarly, Catherine's clothes are in part echoed by Chloe's clothing, and their relationship in the film is complex and subtle.

== Financing and distribution ==
StudioCanal fully financed Chloe and was able to fully recoup the film's budget via international pre-sales. In 2009, the film was screened in special presentation at the 2009 Toronto International Film Festival, and at the London Film Festival, and was also the opening film at the San Sebastián International Film Festival.

Sony Pictures Worldwide Acquisitions Group paid a low seven-figure sum to acquire the United States distribution rights of Chloe, and the group opened this film in limited theatrical release in the United States on March 26, 2010 through Sony Pictures Classics. In the United States, this film grossed $3 million theatrically, which was generally considered as a respectful result for an arthouse film release in early 2010's.

In the wake of Chloe, Egoyan had since received many scripts of erotic thrillers. Amanda Seyfried's performance in this film also helped her to gain industry acclaim and become considered for more roles.

=== Home media ===
Chloe was released in the United States on July 13, 2010 in both DVD and Blu-ray Disc. The disc includes an audio commentary, making-of featurette, and deleted scenes. The film did especially well in Home Video rentals; for instance, the film stayed in Redbox Top 10 DVD rentals chart for three straight weeks (very good result for an arthouse release in the United States).

Several months following the DVD and Blu-ray release of Chloe, Egoyan said that Chloe had made more money than any of his previous films.

== Reception ==
=== Critical response ===
On Rotten Tomatoes, the film has an approval rating of 52% based on 159 reviews, with an average rating of 5.80/10. The site's consensus is that "Despite its promising pedigree and a titillating premise, Chloe ultimately fails to deliver the heat—or the thrills—expected of a sexual thriller." Metacritic, which assigns a score from major reviewers, gave the film a 49 out of 100, based on 33 reviews, indicating "Mixed or average reviews."

Roger Ebert of the Chicago Sun-Times gave the film three and a half out of four stars and wrote: "It's not the kind of movie that depends on the certainty of an ending. It's more about how things continue."

Todd McCarthy of Variety gave the film a mixed review: "Sexual suspicion and game-playing spiral down from the exotically intriguing to outright silliness in Chloe."

Anthony Lane of The New Yorker compared the film to the French original: "The movie--directed by Atom Egoyan, who should know better--is closely adapted from Nathalie..., a French film of 2004, with Gérard Depardieu and Emmanuelle Béart, but what seemed like standard practice for Parisians comes across here as unsmiling porno-farce″.

=== Accolades ===
Award	Date of ceremony	Category	Recipients	Result	Ref.
Canadian Society of Cinematographers	2 April 2011	Theatrical Feature Cinematography	Paul Sarossy	Nominated	
Directors Guild of Canada	September 25, 2010	Best Feature Film		Nominated	
Directors Guild of Canada	September 25, 2010	Best Direction – Feature Film	Atom Egoyan	Nominated	
Directors Guild of Canada	September 25, 2010	Best Production Design – Feature Film	Phillip Barker	Nominated	
Directors Guild of Canada	September 25, 2010	Best Picture Editing – Feature Film	Susan Shipton	Won	
Directors Guild of Canada	September 25, 2010	Best Sound Editing – Feature Film	Steve Munro, David Drainie Taylor, Paul Shikata, Richard Cadger, John Loranger	Won	
