= Rachel Blanchard =

Canadian actress (born 1976)

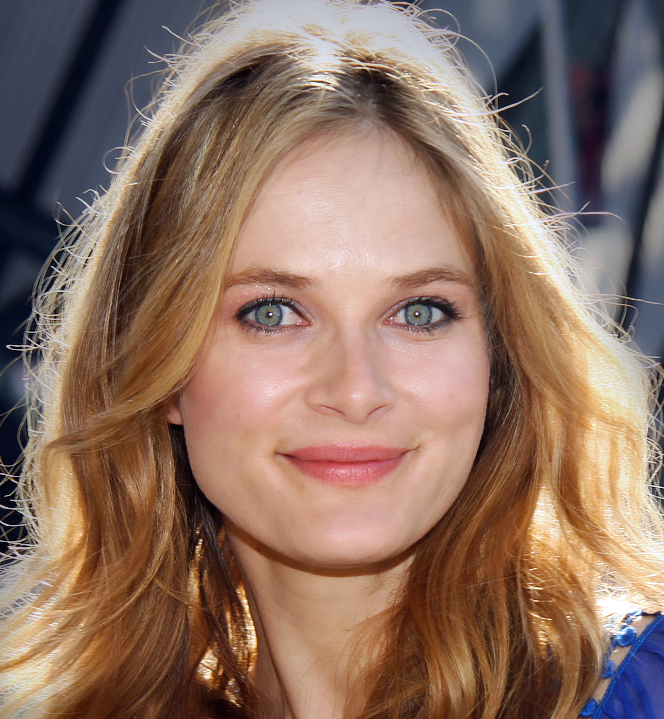
- Blanchard at the 2008 Toronto International Film Festival
- Born: 19 March 1976 (age 50); Toronto, Ontario, Canada
- Occupation: Actress
- Years active: 1984–present

Rachel Louise Blanchard (born 19 March 1976) is a Canadian actress. Her television roles include Nancy in the British sitcom Peep Show, Emma in the American comedy-drama series You Me Her and Susannah in the American romantic drama series The Summer I Turned Pretty.

== Career ==
Blanchard's career was launched with a part in a McDonald's commercial, and as an eight-year-old on the Canadian children's show The Kids of Degrassi Street, in which she played Melanie Schlegel. She also starred in the television series War of the Worlds as Suzanne McCullough's daughter Debi and in YTV's Are You Afraid of the Dark? as Kristen. Blanchard played the role of Cher Horowitz in the sequel television series Clueless, based on the 1995 film of the same name. She played Roxanne Richardson on the television series 7th Heaven from 2002 to 2004.

Blanchard had notable turns in fellow Canadian director and auteur Atom Egoyan films, first with Where the Truth Lies (2005), then as protagonist Rachel in Adoration (2008), winner of the Ecumenical Jury Prize at that year's Cannes Film Festival.

Blanchard appeared as Nancy, the American girlfriend of main character Jeremy Usborne, in the second series of British sitcom Peep Show. She reprised this role in the fourth series (2007). She played Sally on the HBO show Flight of the Conchords and had a recurring role in the first season of the 2014 FX crime series Fargo. From 2016–2020, Blanchard played Emma Trakarsky in the comedy-drama You Me Her, about a woman who enters into a polyamorous relationship with her husband and a younger woman.

She won the Gemini Award for Best Supporting Actress in a Comedy Series at the 26th Gemini Awards for her appearance on Call Me Fitz.

== Filmography ==
=== Film ===
Year	Title	Role	Notes
1991	On My Own	Tania	
1995	Iron Eagle on the Attack	Kitty Shaw	
1999	The Rage: Carrie 2	Monica Jones	
2000	Road Trip	Tiffany Henderson	
2001	Sugar & Spice	Hannah Wald	
2001	Nailed	Kelly Sherman	
2002	The Wild Dogs	Moll	
2003	Chasing Holden	T.J. Jensen	
2004	Without a Paddle	Flower	
2005	Where the Truth Lies	Maureen O'Flaherty	
2006	Comeback Season	Chloe Pearce	
2006	Snakes on a Plane	Mercedes Harbont	
2007	Careless	Cheryl	
2008	Adoration	Rachel	
2008	Growing Op	Crystal	
2009	Spread	Emily	
2010	Open House	Alice	
2010	Daydream Nation	Ms. Budge	
2012	Overnight	Jenny	
2012	My Uncle Rafael	Michele	
2013	Mad Ship	Adeline	
2013	Scrapper	Sharon	
2014	Dark Hearts	Clarissa	
2020	Getting to Know You	Kayla	
2022	Deep Water	Kristin Peterson	
2024	Uno	Rachel Graham	
2025	Vicious	Lainie	

=== Television ===
Year	Title	Role	Notes
1984–1985	The Kids of Degrassi Street	Melanie Schlegel	"Liz Sits the Schlegels", "Martin Meets the Pirates"
1985	The Littlest Hobo	Lisa Farrell	"Voyageurs: Parts 1 & 2"
1986	The Elephant Show	Rachel	"Masquerade"
1986	Alex: The Life of a Child	Wendy	TV film
1988	Glory Enough for All	Melanie	TV film
1988–1990	War of the Worlds	Debi McCullough	Main role
1990	The Campbells	Bonnie	"Back to School"
1990	The Hitchhiker	Karen	"Riding the Nightmare"
1990	Clarence	Jill	TV film
1992–1993	Are You Afraid of the Dark?	Kristen	Main role
1993–1995	Chris Cross	Dinah McGee	Main role
1995	Young Ivanhoe	Rowena	TV film
1996	Flash Forward	Ellen Fisher	"No More Good Days", "House Party", "Cool Book"
1996–1999	Clueless	Cher Horowitz	Main role
2002–2004	7th Heaven	Roxanne Richardson	Main role
2004–2007	Peep Show	Nancy	Recurring role
2005	1/4life	Lisa	TV film
2005	Joey	Joelle	"Joey and the Fancy Sister"
2006	Our Thirties	Jessica	Short
2007	Flight of the Conchords	Sally	"Sally", "Sally Returns"
2008	Anne of Green Gables: A New Beginning	Louisa Thomas	TV film
2009	Everything She Ever Wanted	Rachel Reede	Miniseries
2010	Call Me Fitz	Janet	"Going Down Syndrome"
2011	Flashpoint	Jackie Emery	"I'd Do Anything"
2011	The Case for Christmas	Lauren	TV film
2012	Wedding Band	Tracy	"We Are Family"
2013	The Surrogacy Trap	Mallory Parkes	TV film
2013	Legit	Allie	"Cuckoo's Nest", "Hat Hair"
2013	Psych	Laura	"Juliet Wears the Pantsuit"
2014	My Gal Sunday	Sunday O'Brien-Parker	TV film
2014	Fargo	Kitty Nygaard	Recurring role
2015	Childrens Hospital	Missy	"Kick Me"
2015	Another Period	Wedding Guest / Clambake Guest	"Reject's Beach", "Modern Pigs"
2016–2020	You Me Her	Emma Trakarsky	Main role
2022–2025	The Summer I Turned Pretty	Susannah Fisher	Main role
2026	9-1-1	Dina Montridge	"War"
2026	Tires	Bonnie	Season 3

=== Music videos ===
Year	Title	Artist(s)	Role	Ref.
2000	"Mr. E's Beautiful Blues"	Eels	Tiffany Henderson	
2004	"Sunday Morning"	Maroon 5	Karaoke Singer	
