= Mychael Danna =

Canadian film score composer

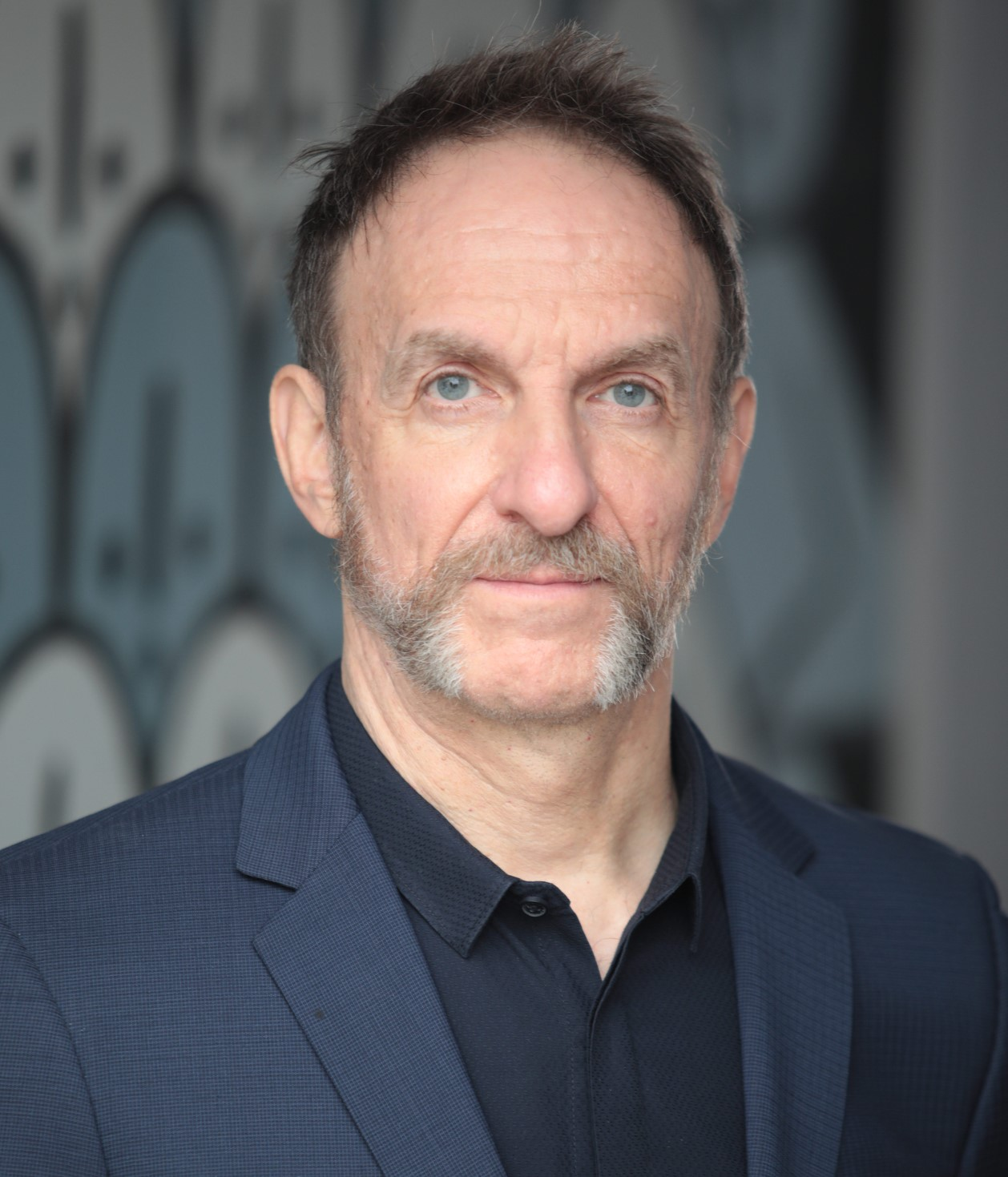
- Danna in January 2020

Background information
- Born: September 20, 1958 (age 68); Winnipeg, Manitoba, Canada
- Origin: Toronto, Ontario, Canada
- Education: University of Toronto
- Occupation: Composer
- Years active: 1987–present
- Website: www.mychaeldanna.com

Mychael Danna (born September 20, 1958) is a Canadian composer of film and television scores. He won both the Golden Globe and Oscar for Best Original Score for Life of Pi. He has also won an Emmy Award for Outstanding Music Composition for a Miniseries, Movie or a Special (Original Dramatic Score) in his work on the miniseries World Without End.

== Personal life ==
Danna's family moved to Burlington, Ontario, when he was four weeks old. He is the brother of fellow composer Jeff Danna. He studied music composition at the University of Toronto Faculty of Music. He has two children with his wife, Aparna.

== Career ==
Danna served for five years as composer-in-residence at the McLaughlin Planetarium in Toronto (1987–1992). Works for dance include music for Dead Souls (Carbone Quatorze Dance Company, directed by Gilles Maheu 1996), and a score for the Royal Winnipeg Ballet's Gita Govinda (2001) based on the 1000-year-old classical Gita Govinda, with choreographer Nina Menon. In June 2014, Danna was awarded an honorary doctorate by the University of Toronto, for his career achievements in the field of music.

He has been scoring films since his 1987 feature debut for Atom Egoyan's Family Viewing, a score which earned Danna the first of his thirteen Genie Award nominations. He has won five times for Achievement in Music - Original Score. Danna is recognized as one of the pioneers of combining non-Western sound sources with orchestral and electronic minimalism in the world of film music. This reputation has led him to work with such directors as Atom Egoyan, Deepa Mehta, Terry Gilliam, Scott Hicks, Ang Lee, Gillies MacKinnon, James Mangold, Mira Nair, Billy Ray, Joel Schumacher, and Denzel Washington. His soundtrack for Ang Lee's Life of Pi earned two Academy Award nominations for Best Original Score and Best Original Song for Pi's Lullaby.

Other films include Dan Scanlon's Onward, Mimi Leder's On the Basis of Sex, Nora Twomey's The Breadwinner, Bennett Miller's Capote and Moneyball and Marc Webb's (500) Days of Summer.

On September 30, 2021, Danna received a Career Achievement Award from the Zurich Film Festival.

== Filmography ==
Year	Title	Notes
1987	Family Viewing	
1987	Caribe	
1988	Murder One	
1988	Blood Relations	
1989	Speaking Parts	
1989	Road to Avonlea	TV series
1989	One Man Out	
1989	Cold Comfort	
1989	Without Work: Not by Choice	Short Film
1989	Termini Station	
1990	Still Life: The Fine Art of Murder	
1991	The Adjuster	
1991	Johann's Gift to Christmas	TV Short series
1991	Montréal vu par...	segment: "En passant"
1991	The Big Slice	
1993	Hush Little Baby	TV movie
1993	Gross Misconduct	TV movie
1993	Ordinary Magic	
1994	Exotica	
1994	The Darling Family	
1994	Narmada: A Valley Rises	Documentary
1994	Dance Me Outside	
1995	Johnny Mnemonic	
1996	Dangerous Offender: The Marlene Moore Story	TV movie
1996	Kama Sutra: A Tale of Love	
1996	Lilies	
1997	The Ice Storm	
1997	The Sweet Hereafter	
1998	At the End of the Day: The Sue Rodriguez Story	
1999	The Boondock Saints	With his brother Jeff Danna
1999	Girl, Interrupted	
1999	Don't Think Twice	Short Film
1999	Ride with the Devil	
1999	Felicia's Journey	
1999	8MM	
1999	The Confession	
2000	Bounce	
2001	Hearts in Atlantis	
2001	Monsoon Wedding	
2001	The Hire: Chosen	
2001	Green Dragon	With his brother Jeff Danna
2002	Antwone Fisher	
2002	The Guys	
2002	Ararat	
2002	The Matthew Shepard Story	Television film
2003	The Snow Walker	
2003	Shattered Glass	
2003	Hulk	Additional cue "Mother"
2004	Being Julia	
2004	Vanity Fair	
2005	Sohni Sapna	
2005	Eve and the Fire Horse	
2005	Tideland	With his brother Jeff Danna
2005	Water	Background score only Genie Award for Best Original Score
2005	Capote	
2005	Where the Truth Lies	
2005	Aurora Borealis	
2006	The Nativity Story	
2006	Little Miss Sunshine	
2006	Lonely Hearts	
2007	Surf's Up	First score for an animated film.
2007	Breach	
2007	Fracture	With his brother Jeff Danna
2008	Adoration	
2008	Management	
2008	Lakeview Terrace	With his brother Jeff Danna
2009	(500) Days of Summer	With Rob Simonsen
2009	Chloe	
2009	The Imaginarium of Doctor Parnassus	With his brother Jeff Danna
2009	The Time Traveler's Wife	
2011	Camelot	TV series With his brother Jeff Danna
2011	Moneyball	
2012	Life of Pi	Academy Award for Best Original Score; Golden Globe Award for Best Original Score; Nominated – Academy Award for Best Original Song ("Pi's Lullaby")
2013	Devil's Knot	
2014	Transcendence	
2014	The Captive	
2014	Tyrant	TV series With his brother Jeff Danna
2015	Sanjay's Super Team	Short Film
2015	Remember	
2015	The Good Dinosaur	With his brother Jeff Danna; Replaced Thomas Newman
2016	Storks	With his brother Jeff Danna
2016	Billy Lynn's Long Halftime Walk	With his brother Jeff Danna
2017	The Breadwinner	With his brother Jeff Danna
2017	The Man Who Invented Christmas	
2018	On the Basis of Sex	
2019	A Dog's Way Home	
2019	The Red Sea Diving Resort	
2019	After the Wedding	
2019	Guest of Honour	
2019	The Addams Family	With his brother Jeff Danna
2020	Onward	With his brother Jeff Danna
2021	Stillwater	
2021	The Addams Family 2	With his brother Jeff Danna
2022	Return to Space	with Harry Gregson-Williams
2022	Where the Crawdads Sing	
2022	My Father's Dragon	With his brother Jeff Danna
2023	No Hard Feelings	with Jessica Rose Weiss
2026	Flavia	With his brother Jeff Danna
TBA	Gold Mountain	
