= Malody =

2012 Canadian short film directed by Phillip Barker

- Directed by: Phillip Barker
- Written by: Phillip Barker
- Produced by: Amanda Gordon
- Starring: Alex Paxton-Beesley; Thomas Hauff
- Cinematography: Kris Belchevsky
- Edited by: Roland Schlimme
- Music by: Tom Third
- Release date: 2012
- Running time: 13 minutes
- Country: Canada

Malody is a Canadian experimental short film, directed by Phillip Barker and released in 2012. The film stars Alex Paxton-Beesley as an ailing woman who sets off a chain of events when she sees a reflection of her younger self (Ashleigh Warren) in a mirror at a diner, with all of the action portrayed as taking place inside a wooden wheel slowly rolling through an empty film studio.

The cast also includes Thomas Hauff as the diner chef, and Ryan Granville-Martin as another customer.

The film was named to the Toronto International Film Festival's annual Canada's Top Ten list for 2012. It was later screened at the 2013 Festival du nouveau cinéma, where it won the Creativity Prize.

It was part of a retrospective screening of Barker's short films in 2018, in conjunction with the publication of Mike Hoolboom's book Strange Machines: The Films of Phillip Barker. The other films in the series were I Am Always Connected, A Temporary Arrangement, Soul Cages, Regarding, Dredger and Shadow Nettes. The series was screened in 2018 at FNC and the TIFF Bell Lightbox, and in 2019 at the Clermont-Ferrand International Short Film Festival.
