= Dear Sandra =

Book by Atom Egoyan

- Author: Atom Egoyan
- Publisher: Volumin
- Publication date: 2007

Dear Sandra (2007) is an artist book created by Atom Egoyan, inspired by and dedicated to the Luchino Visconti film Vaghe stelle dell'Orsa.

It was published by Volumin.
