= Arsinée Khanjian =

Canadian actress and producer (born 1958)

- Արսինե Խանջյան
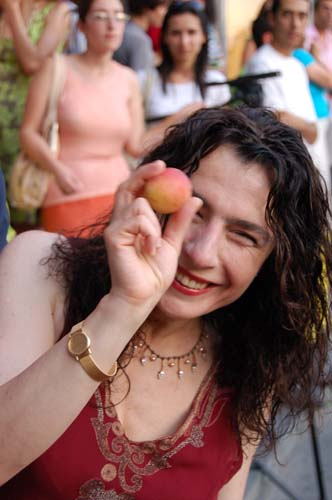
- Khanjian at the Third Golden Apricot Film Festival at Yerevan, Armenia.
- Born: 6 September 1958 (age 68); Beirut, Lebanon
- Citizenship: Lebanon; Canada; Armenia (since 2018)
- Education: Concordia University; University of Toronto
- Occupations: Actress, film producer
- Years active: 1984–present
- Spouse: Atom Egoyan
- Children: 1

Arsinée Khanjian (Western Armenian: Արսինէ Խանճեան, Eastern Armenian: Արսինե Խանջյան; Arabic: آرسينيه خانجيان; born 6 September 1958) is a Lebanese-Canadian actress and activist. She is widely known for her collaborations with her husband, filmmaker Atom Egoyan. She won the 2003 Genie Award for Best Performance by an Actress in a Leading Role for her role in Ararat.

== Biography ==
=== Early life and education ===
Khanjian was born in Beirut in 1958 to an Armenian family. Her grandparents had fled to Lebanon from present-day Turkey in 1915 as refugees from the Armenian genocide. Her paternal grandparents were from Diyarbakır Province in present-day Turkey, originally with the surname Hagopian. According to Khanjian, her paternal grandfather was protected during the genocide by a Kurdish family. He lived under a false Kurdish identity, and at one time was married to a Kurdish woman, before emigrating to Lebanon.

Khanjian was raised trilingual, speaking Armenian at home, Lebanese Arabic with her friends, and French in school.

Her family emigrated to Canada when Khanjian was 17 due to the Lebanese Civil War, settling in Montreal. She studied theatre at the Conservatoire Lasalle, and earned a bachelor's degree in French and Spanish at Concordia University. While earning her master's degree in political science at Université de Montréal, she met her future husband Atom Egoyan, who cast her in his debut film Next of Kin. She then moved with Egoyan to Toronto, finishing her degree at the University of Toronto, while working for the Ontario Arts Council.

=== Acting ===
To date, Khanjian has starred in 14 films directed by her husband. She won the Genie Award for Best Performance by an Actress in a Leading Role for his 2002 film Ararat.

Her work for other directors includes French director Olivier Assayas' Irma Vep (1996) and Late August, Early September (1998), and Catherine Breillat's Fat Girl (2001). She had a supporting role in The Cut (2014), directed by Turkish-German filmmaker Fatih Akin. She was nominated for a second Genie Award for playing the title character in the romantic dramedy Sabah (2005). She won a Gemini Award for her performance on the CBC anthology drama Foolish Heart.

Her theatre work has included stage roles in both Canada and France. She starred in the debut production of Palace of the End by the Canadian Stage Company. She wrote, directed, and starred in the play Auction of Souls at the Maxim Gorki Theater in Berlin. She toured France and Japan with a French-language production of Brian Friel's Dancing at Lughnasa.

Khanjian was a jury member for the Cinéfoundation and Short Films sections at the 2012 Cannes Film Festival.

=== Activism ===
Khanjian is a civil rights activist and was briefly detained in Armenia in 2016 while protesting human rights abuses.

In 2017, Khanjian, along with Egoyan and Serj Tankian, founded the "Justice Within Armenia" initiative and participated in the parliamentary elections in Armenia as an observer.

Khanjian participated in the 2018 Armenian Revolution, repeatedly speaking at rallies, and making speeches on various platforms.

== Honours ==
Khanjian received the Queen Elizabeth II Golden Jubilee Medal in 2002.

In 2003, Khanjian was awarded the Order of St. Mesrop Mashtots. The same year, she received the Queen Zabel Medal by the Armenian Apostolic Church in America.

In 2011, Khanjian was awarded the Order for "Services to the Motherland" by the Armenian government.

== Personal life ==
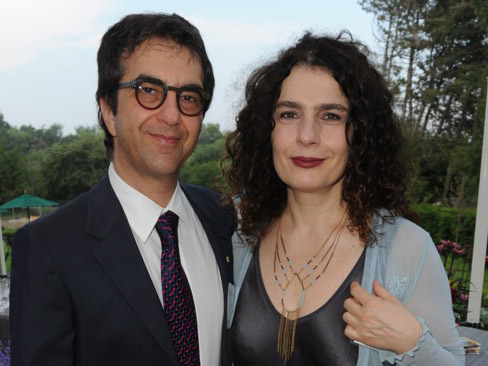
Khanjian with her husband Atom Egoyan in 2013

Khanjian's husband, Atom Egoyan, credits her for inspiring him to further explore his Armenian roots. The two received Armenian citizenship in 2018. She lives in Toronto with her husband and their son, Arshile.

== Filmography ==
=== Film ===
| Year | Title | Role | Notes |
|---|---|---|---|
| 1984 | Next of Kin | Azah Deryan | |
| 1988 | Family Viewing | Aline | |
| 1988 | The Box of Sun (La boîte à soleil) | | |
| 1989 | Speaking Parts | Lisa | |
| 1991 | The Adjuster | Hera | |
| 1992 | Chickpeas | | |
| 1993 | Calendar | Translator | Also co-producer |
| 1994 | Exotica | Zoe | |
| 1996 | Irma Vep | The American | |
| 1997 | The Sweet Hereafter | Wanda | |
| 1997 | Bach Cello Suite #4: Sarabande | Sarah | |
| 1998 | Sentimental Education | Arthur | |
| 1998 | Last Night | Streetcar Mother | |
| 1998 | Late August, Early September | Lucie | |
| 1999 | Felicia's Journey | Gala | |
| 2000 | Code Unknown: Incomplete Tales of Several Journeys | Francine | |
| 2001 | Fat Girl | Mrs. Pingot | |
| 2002 | Ararat | Ani | |
| 2005 | Sabah | Sabah | |
| 2005 | Where the Truth Lies | Publishing Executive | |
| 2007 | The Lark Farm | Armineh | |
| 2008 | Adoration | Sabine | |
| 2011 | Nobody Else But You | Dr. Juliette Geminy | |
| 2012 | No Man's Zone | Narrator (voice) | |
| 2014 | The Cut | Mrs. Nakashian | |
| 2014 | Atlit | Mona | |
| 2014 | The Captive | Diane Grey | |
| 2016 | Lost in Armenia | Tzarkanoush | |
| 2016 | The Other Side of November | Lea/Layla | |
| 2017 | Last Car | Mayor Keele | |
| 2019 | We Are Gold | | |
| 2019 | Guest of Honour | Anna | |
| 2025 | Door Prize | Mayor Henze | Post-production |

==== Short films ====
| Year | Title | Role | Notes |
|---|---|---|---|
| 1988 | Looking for Nothing | | |
| 1991 | En passant | Rima | Segment of anthology film Montreal Stories |
| 1995 | A Portrait of Arshile | Voice | |
| 1995 | 2 rue de la mémoire | | |
| 1997 | Strands | Lab Worker | |
| 2000 | Hokees | Anahid | |
| 2011 | De temps et d'eau | | |
| 2024 | Before They Joined Us | | |

=== Television ===
| Year | Title | Role | Notes |
|---|---|---|---|
| 1993 | Street Legal | Rosa Martino | Episode: "Truth or Dare" |
| 1994–1995 | Side Effects | Elaine Chen | Main role (12 episodes) |
| 1996 | Dinner Along the Amazon | Olivia Penney | TV short |
| 1997 | Ms. Scrooge | Cratchit | TV film |
| 1998 | More Tears | Andrea | TV series |
| 1999 | Foolish Heart | Lena | TV series |
| 2000 | Foreign Objects | Maria | TV series |
| 2001 | Mentors | Anaïs Nin | Episode: "Experience" |
| 2002 | Made in Canada | Crystal | Episode: "Veronica's Friend" |
| 2005 | Slings and Arrows | Nadine Perola | Episode: "Rarer Monsters" |
| 2006 | ReGenesis | Eva Ramone | Episode: "Our Men in Havana" |
| 2009 | The Border | Ghayda Hassan | Episode: "Broken" |
| 2013 | Murder in Passing | Mayor | 42 episodes |
| 2019 | Coroner | Muna Khalighi | Episode: "All's Well" |

== Awards and nominations ==
- Chlotrudis Society for Independent Film Chloe Award (2002).
- Recipient of the Queen's Golden Jubilee Medal (2002).
- Queen Zabel Award by the Eastern Prelacy of the Armenian Apostolic Church of America (2003).
- Sourp Mesrob Mashdotz Award (2003)
- Durban International Film Festival Winner for Best Actress in Ararat (2003)
- Genie Award for Best Performance by an Actress in a Leading Role in Ararat (2003).
- The Crystal Award for Creative Excellence by Women in Film and Television (2005)
