= The Box of Sun =

- French: La boîte à soleil
- Directed by: Jean Pierre Lefebvre
- Written by: Jean Pierre Lefebvre
- Produced by: Jean Pierre Lefebvre
- Starring: Atom Egoyan; Arsinée Khanjian
- Cinematography: Lionel Simmons
- Edited by: Barbara Easto
- Music by: Jean Pierre Lefebvre
- Production company: Cinak
- Release date: September 11, 1988 (TIFF)
- Running time: 73 minutes
- Country: Canada

The Box of Sun (French: La boîte à soleil) is a Canadian film, directed by Jean Pierre Lefebvre and released in 1988. Told without dialogue, the film is set in a surreal fantasy world in which the sun has been blocked from the sky, but a group of children have access to a source of light hidden in the forest; it stars Arsinée Khanjian as a young woman who seeks out the children for their help in reviving her lover (Atom Egoyan).

The film premiered at the 1988 Festival of Festivals.
