= Jennifer Weiss (producer) =

Canadian film producer

Jennifer Weiss is a film producer. She co-founded Film Farm Productions with Simone Urdl.

== Filmography ==
- Luck (2003)
- Away from Her (2006)
- Redacted (2007)
- Adoration (2008)
- Daydream Nation (2010)
- The Captive (2014)
- Octavio Is Dead! (2018)
- Falls Around Her (2018)
- Guest of Honour (2019)
- The Middle Man (2021)
- Stellar (2022)
- Fitting In (2023)

== Recognition ==
- 2008 Genie Award for Best Motion Picture - Away from Her - Won (shared with Daniel Iron, Simone Urdl)
- 2003 Genie Award for Best Live Action Short Drama - I Shout Love - Won (shared with Meredith Caplan, Sarah Polley)
