= EarthWorm =

2024 Canadian short film directed by Phillip Barker

- Directed by: Phillip Barker
- Written by: Phillip Barker; Seungwoo Park
- Produced by: Adriana Bogaard; Phillip Barker
- Starring: Seungwoo Park
- Cinematography: Kris Belchevsky
- Edited by: Phillip Barker; David Wharnsby
- Music by: Tom Third
- Release date: February 2, 2024 (Clermont-Ferrand)
- Running time: 16 minutes
- Country: Canada

EarthWorm is a Canadian experimental short film, directed by Phillip Barker and released in 2024. Told primarily through dance rather than dialogue, the film depicts the story of Sean (Seungwoo Park), a space alien who has been sent to Earth to help protect humans from extinction, but struggles to adapt to gravity.

The cast also includes Sarah Apsley, Frida Ruxton Chatterton and Dante Varga.

The film premiered in February 2024 at the Clermont-Ferrand International Short Film Festival. It had its Canadian premiere in March at the Regard short film festival in Saguenay, where it won the Grand Prix for Canadian films.

The film was shortlisted for the Directors Guild of Canada's Best Short Film award, and was named to the Toronto International Film Festival's annual Canada's Top Ten list for 2024.
