= Adoration (2008 film) =

- U.S. theatrical poster
- Directed by: Atom Egoyan
- Written by: Atom Egoyan
- Produced by: Atom Eyogan; Jennifer Weiss; Simone Urdl
- Starring: Arsinée Khanjian; Scott Speedman; Rachel Blanchard; Noam Jenkins; Devon Bostick; Kenneth Welsh
- Cinematography: Paul Sarossy
- Edited by: Susan Shipton
- Music by: Mychael Danna
- Production companies: Serendipity Point Films; ARP Selection; The Film Farm; Ego Film Arts
- Distributed by: Entertainment One
- Release dates: May 22, 2008 (Cannes); April 24, 2009 (Canada)
- Running time: 100 minutes
- Country: Canada
- Language: English
- Budget: $4 million

Adoration is a 2008 Canadian drama film written and directed by Atom Egoyan and starring Arsinée Khanjian, Scott Speedman, Rachel Blanchard, Noam Jenkins, Devon Bostick, and Kenneth Welsh.

The film was first shown at the 2008 Cannes Film Festival, where it won the Prize of the Ecumenical Jury and was nominated for the Palme d'Or. Adoration won "Best Canadian Feature Film – Special Jury Citation" at the 2008 Toronto International Film Festival. It was released in theatres in Canada on April 24, 2009, by Entertainment One.

== Plot ==
High school French teacher Sabine reads to her class as a translation exercise a French newspaper report of a terrorist who planted a bomb in the airline luggage of his pregnant girlfriend. If the bomb had detonated, it would have killed her, her unborn child, and many others, but it was discovered in time by Israeli security personnel. Egoyan based the story partly on the 1986 Hindawi affair.

In the course of translating, Simon, who lives with his maternal uncle Tom, imagines that the news item is his own family's story: that his Palestinian father Sami was the terrorist, the woman was his mother Rachel, an accomplished violinist, and he was her unborn child. Years ago, Sami crashed the family car, killing both himself and Rachel, making Simon an orphan. Influenced by his maternal grandfather, Morris, who disliked Sami, Simon has always feared that the crash was not an accident but intentional.

Sabine asks him to develop the story as a drama exercise, to read it to the class, and for dramatic effect to pretend that it really happened. He does so, and discussions evolve on the Internet about the story. Sabine is fired for making Simon lie.

Tom, who is a tow truck driver, tows Sabine's car away. Sabine follows him in a taxi, and by mobile phone she offers him a meal in a restaurant. Later she reveals to him that she had been married to Sami for 5 years, until Sami met Rachel.

== Cast ==
- Arsinée Khanjian as Sabine
- Scott Speedman as Tom
- Rachel Blanchard as Rachel
- Noam Jenkins as Sami
- Devon Bostick as Simon
- Kenneth Welsh as Morris
- Katie Boland as Hannah
- Geraldine O'Rawe as Carole

== Production ==
The Internet discussion sessions featured in the film were edited from a two- to four-hour improvised group discussion undertaken on the Internet by several of Egoyan's friends and fellow artists.

== Reception ==
The film received mostly positive reviews. On review aggregator Rotten Tomatoes, Adoration has a score of 62% based on 101 critics, with an average rating of 6.1/10, the critical consensus stating, "A complex and thought-provoking work, Atom Egoyan's Adoration works well as both mystery and engaging drama." On Metacritic, the film has a score of 64 out of 100, based on 20 reviews, indicating "generally favorable reviews".
