= Where the Truth Lies =

- Original release poster
- Directed by: Atom Egoyan
- Screenplay by: Atom Egoyan
- Based on: Where the Truth Lies by Rupert Holmes
- Produced by: Robert Lantos
- Starring: Kevin Bacon; Colin Firth; Alison Lohman; Rachel Blanchard; Sonja Bennett
- Cinematography: Paul Sarossy
- Edited by: Susan Shipton
- Music by: Mychael Danna
- Production companies: Serendipity Point Films; Telefilm Canada; The Movie Network
- Distributed by: United States and Canada; THINKFilm; United Kingdom: Momentum Pictures; International: Summit Entertainment
- Release dates: 13 May 2005 (Cannes); 7 October 2005 (Canada)
- Running time: 107 minutes
- Countries: United Kingdom; Canada
- Language: English
- Budget: $25 million
- Box office: $3.5 million

Where the Truth Lies is a 2005 thriller film written and directed by Atom Egoyan and starring Kevin Bacon, Colin Firth, and Alison Lohman. It is based on Rupert Holmes's 2003 novel of the same name.

The film alternates between 1957, when comedy duo Lanny Morris (Bacon) and Vince Collins (Firth) are at the height of their success, and 1972, when journalist Karen O'Connor (Lohman) is determined to unravel the mystery of a young woman found dead in their hotel suite 15 years before.

== Plot ==
In 1957, immediately after co-hosting a 39-hour polio telethon in Miami, entertainers Lanny Morris and Vince Collins fly north to open the new showroom of a New Jersey hotel run by mobster Sally Sanmarco, who has intimidated them into appearing. In their hotel suite, the nude body of Miami college student Maureen O'Flaherty is found in a bathtub.

Maureen, an aspiring journalist working for the summer at the duo's Miami hotel (also owned by Sanmarco), had interviewed them in Miami for her college newspaper just before she disappeared. Police investigators did not connect Morris or Collins to Maureen's death, officially attributed to a drug overdose. Soon after, the two men's comedy partnership is dissolved, despite their success and dependence on one another.

Many unanswered questions remain around Maureen's death; the most confusing aspect is how she got from Miami where she was last seen to New Jersey where her body was found.

Fifteen years later, journalist Karen O'Connor, who as a young polio survivor first met the duo at the 1957 telethon and has since idolized them, accepts a job to ghostwrite Collins' autobiography — a deal from which he will earn $1 million. Karen makes a promise to Maureen's mother that she will find the truth of how her daughter died. The project is complicated by Karen receiving anonymously sent chapters from a book Morris is writing.

Karen encounters Morris by chance on a Pan Am flight to New York; he is accompanied by his valet, Reuben, and manager, Irv. During the flight she shares a dinner table with them. Wishing to keep her identity secret, she introduces herself as "Bonnie Trout," the name of her best friend with whom she has traded apartments. Morris and Karen hit it off and have sex in his hotel. He disappears the next morning, apparently without leaving her a note.

Under her own name, Karen begins to work on the Collins book. Complications arise when Collins invites her to an all-day working session at his Los Angeles home, and she learns that Morris will be joining them as well. She abruptly invents an excuse to leave, but meets Morris in the driveway, and her masquerade is revealed — Morris learns she has lied about who she is, and Collins discovers that the woman helping him write his memoirs has had an affair with his ex-partner.

Collins agrees to continue with the book, but creates a situation to blackmail Karen into staying away from the story of Maureen O'Flaherty, which is Karen's consuming interest. After plying Karen with wine and drugs, Collins manipulates her into having sex with a young singer. He photographs the two women in compromising positions. He then presses Karen to tell the publisher that there is nothing odd or improper surrounding Maureen's death, or he will make the pictures public.

The truth of that night fifteen years prior slowly comes to light: a drug-and-alcohol-fueled ménage à trois ended in tragedy when Collins raped Morris, who fought back violently. Collins retreated to his room in shame, whereupon Maureen tried to blackmail Morris into paying to keep this a secret, and then fell asleep on the couch. In the morning, she was dead.

Fifteen years later, Karen has begun to uncover the story when Morris's "fix-it man," Reuben, approaches her. While both Morris and Collins were convinced the other murdered Maureen, they smuggled her body out of Miami with Reuben's assistance in a crate full of lobsters (a gift from Sanmarco), shipping it ahead of them to the New Jersey hotel. Reuben tells her that Maureen had turned her tape recorder on again after her interview, to record her interactions with Morris and Collins.

Reuben offers to produce the tape, but only if Karen's publishing company is willing to pay him $1 million. Karen realizes that Reuben had been blackmailing Collins, demanding money to keep quiet about his bisexuality and his involvement in Maureen's death. Distraught, Collins commits suicide.

Karen returns to Mrs. O'Flaherty but decides to publish her findings once the woman died, sparing her the pain of knowing the details of her daughter's behavior that contributed to the murder.

== Cast ==
- Kevin Bacon as Lanny Morris
- Colin Firth as Vince Collins
- Alison Lohman as Karen O'Connor
- David Hayman as Reuben
- Rachel Blanchard as Maureen O'Flaherty
- Maury Chaykin as Sally Sanmarco
- Kristin Adams as Alice
- Deborah Grover as Mrs. O'Flaherty
- Sonja Bennett as Bonnie Trout
- Beau Starr as Jack Scaglia
- Arsinée Khanjian as Publishing Executive
- Gabrielle Rose as Publishing Executive
- Don McKellar as Publishing Executive
- David Hemblen as NY Hotel Concierge
- Michael J. Reynolds as John Hillman
- Rebecca Davis as Denise
- Kathryn Winslow as Publicist

== Production ==
Rupert Holmes admittedly patterned Vince Collins and Lanny Morris on his childhood idols, Dean Martin and Jerry Lewis, although the plot was pure fiction. Holmes called it a study of "the trust that must exist between any show business team who puts their lives in each other's hands" and "what happens when they no longer trust each other." Shortly after the novel was published, Holmes was asked who he envisioned playing the lead roles in a film adaptation. He suggested Ben Affleck, Matt Damon, and Kate Hudson, or Tom Cruise, Ben Stiller "and any actress in America who's shorter than they are." Tongue-in-cheek, he continued, "Or what about Kukla, Fran and Ollie? This is probably why I'm not a studio head."

Scenes in Vince's home were filmed at the Stahl House in Los Angeles, while the Brantford Airport stood in for Newark International Airport. Other exteriors were filmed in Toronto, with interiors shot at Shepperton Studios in Surrey, England.

The film's soundtrack includes "Josephine, Please No Lean on the Bell" performed by Louis Prima, "Spinning Wheel" by Blood, Sweat & Tears, "Oye Como Va" by Santana, and "Maggot Brain" by Funkadelic. "White Rabbit", written by Grace Slick and originally recorded by Jefferson Airplane, is featured prominently in one scene, while "You Know, You Know" and "Sanctuary", performed by Mahavishnu Orchestra, appear in the film's most erotic sequence.

== Rating ==
The film received an NC-17 rating in the United States due to scenes depicting a threesome and graphic lesbian sex. Egoyan condemned the MPAA decision as "a violent act of censorship", while Bacon stated, "I don't get it, when I see films (that) are extremely violent, extremely objectionable sometimes in terms of the roles that women play, slide by with an R, no problem, because the people happen to have more clothes on." Both suggested that homophobia may have played a role in the decision, as the film deals in part with repressed homosexuality. THINKFilm executives opted to release the film unrated in the United States. The rating was later a minor subject of analysis in the documentary This Film Is Not Yet Rated.

== Release ==
Where the Truth Lies premiered at the 2005 Cannes Film Festival and was shown at the Karlovy Vary Film Festival, the 2005 Toronto International Film Festival, the Woodstock Film Festival, and Festival do Rio in Brazil, before going into theatrical release in Canada on 7 October 2005 and the United States the following week.

=== Box office ===
The film grossed $872,142 in North America and $2,605,536 in other markets, for a total worldwide box office of $3,477,678. The unrated designation hurt the film's financial return, since many theaters would not show it due to its NC-17 rating.

=== Critical reception ===
Where the Truth Lies garnered mixed reviews. On Rotten Tomatoes the film holds an approval rating of 41% based on 101 reviews, with average rating of 5.4/10. The site's consensus states: "The belabored noir plotting feels unbelievable, thus removing any sense of suspense. Also, Lohman is badly miscast." On Metacritic, it has a score of 47 out of 100, based on reviews from 29 critics, indicating "mixed or average reviews".

Manohla Dargis of the New York Times observed, "Mr. Egoyan [...] tends to stray from the storytelling straight and narrow, taking a generally metafictional approach to narrative. Here, he seems to want to deconstruct celebrity through the familiar mechanics of a murder mystery. Yet because he also doesn't want to be imprisoned by genre, he tries to shake loose its rules, much as Robert Altman did in 1973 with his laid-back take on Raymond Chandler's Long Goodbye. It almost works, at least in part [...] In the end, it is Mr. Egoyan's fealty to the novel, its feints and dodges, that proves the film's undoing." She called Kevin Bacon "excellent" but questioned "the calamitous miscasting" of Alison Lohman, "whose ingénue looks and uncontrolled voice are wildly out of sync with the film's other performances and self-consciously lurid atmosphere [...] [S]he has neither the chops nor the core mystery that might have made Mr. Egoyan's pseudo-David Lynch ambitions for his film fly."

Roger Ebert of the Chicago Sun-Times called it "film noir right down to the plot we can barely track; we're reminded of William Faulkner asking Raymond Chandler who did it in The Big Sleep and Chandler saying he wasn't sure [...] Atom Egoyan, no stranger to labyrinthine plots, makes this one into a whodunit puzzle crossed with some faraway echoes of Sunset Boulevard [...] I have seen Where the Truth Lies twice and enjoyed it more when I understood its secrets."

Peter Travers of Rolling Stone rated the film one star out of four, calling it a "monumental misfire" and adding, "This movie isn't over-the-top – it doesn't know where the top is. Trash addicts will eat up every graphic minute, even if they prefer to wait for the DVD."

Ruthe Stein of the San Francisco Chronicle called the film "compulsively watchable even as laughably over-the-top moments start piling up. To be truthful, most of it is high-gloss trash. I'm prepared to recommend Truth despite this – or maybe because of it [...] Bacon has the showier role, and he wrings everything he can out of it. But Firth is equally impressive [...] Truth's descent into camp happens mostly during the scenes set in the '70s. Lohman is a big part of the problem [...] she's so shrill and annoying as Karen that you end up wishing she were the one floating in that tub."

Todd McCarthy of Variety called the film "unconvincing" and "jumbled" and added, "Fractured narrative devices are further encumbered by multiple narration sources, incidental characters who function as mere devices, and uncertain time frames. More bothersome still is the stiff, on-topic nature of most of the film; with Karen in full interrogation mode nearly all the time, scenes and characters are rarely allowed to breathe and develop of their own accord [...] a problem unrelieved by Lohman's performance, which reveals nothing beneath the surface or between the lines. Bacon and Firth both prove more than adept at conveying their characters' seamy sides, which at least lends weight to the distasteful revelations in which the story is rooted, and are reasonably effective overall in cutting the desired profiles of glib entertainers taking full advantage of fame's perks."

Peter Bradshaw of The Guardian rated the film two out of five stars, saying it had "rich potential for suspense, for drama, for comedy, for tragedy, for historical colour, for just about everything. Yet in the most perplexing way, Egoyan's movie doesn't properly deliver on any of these. It is muddled, over-wrought, and somehow too cerebral and fastidious to tell the story straight [...] There are diverting moments but it adds up to nothing in particular. The question is not so much where the truth lies, but why we should care in the first place."

Philip French of The Observer called the film "a rich brew that draws on Citizen Kane and Rashomon" and ultimately "holds the attention and makes us want to know the outcome."

In December 2005, it was named to the Toronto International Film Festival's annual Canada's Top Ten list of the year's best Canadian films.

=== Accolades ===
Egoyan was nominated for the Palme d'Or at the 2005 Cannes Film Festival.

The Directors Guild of Canada honored Phillip Barker for Outstanding Production Design in a Feature Film and nominated Egoyan for Outstanding Direction of a Feature Film, Susan Shipton for Outstanding Picture Editing of a Feature Film, and the movie itself for Outstanding Feature Film.

Egoyan won the Genie Award for Best Adapted Screenplay, and the film was nominated in the Art Direction/Production Design, Editing, Sound, and Original Score categories.

== Soundtrack ==
Where The Truth Lies: Original Motion Picture Soundtrack

Film score by Mychael Danna
- Released: 1 November 2005
- Length: 46:28
- Label: Varèse Sarabande

All music is composed by Mychael Danna.

Where The Truth Lies: Original Motion Picture Soundtrack
No.	Title	Length
1.	"Maureen"	1:04
2.	"Together Wherever we Go"	1:23
3.	"Hollywood and Vine"	1:16
4.	"I'll See You Inside"	0:33
5.	"There'll Be No Next Time"	1:01
6.	"Which Floor?"	1:44
7.	"Should Get Some Sleep"	0:48
8.	"Palace del Sol"	1:28
9.	"He's Not Like That"	1:11
10.	"The Chinese Restaurant"	4:10
11.	"This Is My Daughter"	3:17
12.	"End of Story"	2:14
13.	"Small Scratches"	2:17
14.	"The Rules Had Changed"	1:38
15.	"Hello Vince"	2:44
16.	"Babes on Hand"	3:04
17.	"The Truth Had Come Out"	2:42
18.	"Who's Gonna Pay Me?"	2:40
19.	"Only to Destroy Us"	1:22
20.	"Get Out of My Office"	1:15
21.	"The Tape"	7:52
22.	"Forgive Me"	2:15
Total length:		46:28

Commercial songs in film, but not on soundtrack

- "White Rabbit" – Performed by Wonderland Band
- "Josephine, Please No Lean on the Bell" – Performed by Louis Prima
- "Just a Gigolo/I Ain't Nobody (And There's Nobody Cares For Me) Medley" – Performed by Blue Grotto Band
- "Spinning Wheel" – Performed by Blood Sweat and Tears
- "White Light" – Performed by Junior's Eyes
- "Whisper Not" – Performed by Art Blakey & The Jazz Messengers
- "Oye Como Va" – Performed by Santana
- "You Know, You Know" – Performed by Mahavishnu Orchestra
- "Theme For Lester Young" – Performed by Charles Mingus
- "Maggot Brain" – Performed by Funkadelic
- "Sanctuary" – Performed by Mahavishnu Orchestra

== Home media ==
On 8 February 2006, Sony Pictures released two versions of the film, one rated R and the other the original unrated, on DVD. Both are in anamorphic widescreen and closed captioned. The unrated version includes an audio track in French. Bonus features on both include The Making of Where The Truth Lies (which has neither commentary nor dialogue) and deleted scenes.
