= The Captive (2014 film) =

2014 Canadian thriller film by Atom Egoyan

- Film poster with French language title
- Directed by: Atom Egoyan
- Written by: Atom Egoyan; David Fraser
- Produced by: Atom Egoyan; Jennifer Weiss; Simone Urdl; Stephen Traynor
- Starring: Ryan Reynolds; Scott Speedman; Rosario Dawson; Mireille Enos; Kevin Durand; Alexia Fast; Christine Horne; Arsinée Khanjian; Ian Matthews; Bruce Greenwood
- Cinematography: Paul Sarossy
- Edited by: Atom Egoyan; Susan Shipton
- Music by: Mychael Danna
- Production companies: Ego Film Arts; The Film Farm
- Distributed by: Entertainment One
- Release dates: 14 May 2014 (Cannes); 5 September 2014 (Canada)
- Running time: 112 minutes
- Country: Canada
- Language: English
- Box office: $2.09 million

The Captive (French: Captives or La Captive) is a 2014 Canadian thriller film directed by Atom Egoyan from a script he co-wrote with David Fraser. The film stars Ryan Reynolds, Bruce Greenwood, Scott Speedman, Rosario Dawson, Mireille Enos, Kevin Durand, and Alexia Fast. It was selected to compete for the Palme d'Or in the main competition section at the 2014 Cannes Film Festival. The film was released in select theatres in on 5 September 2014.

The film has a nonlinear presentation, and only context differentiates the current scenes from the flashbacks. Additionally, although the film takes place over eight years, all of the scenes take place during winter for dramatic effect.

== Plot ==
In Niagara Falls, Ontario, homicide detective Jeffrey Cornwall interviews for a job with Nicole Dunlop in the Internet Child Exploitation Unit. He recoils in disgust after seeing the images related to an open case, but Nicole advises him these are the types of images he will have to see every day and not look away from.

Meanwhile, local contractor Matthew Lane picks up his 9-year-old daughter, Cassandra, after her figure skating practice. Matthew stops to pick up pie, leaving Cassandra in his truck. Minutes later, he returns to find her missing. He reports the abduction to the police station, where Jeffrey and Nicole are assigned to the case. They are skeptical of his story, which infuriates him. Cassandra's mother, Tina Lane, arrives and breaks down in rage at Matthew.

Eight years later, Matthew and Tina are estranged; she blames him for Cassandra's disappearance. Nicole and Jeffrey are now romantically involved. Tina meets with the police regularly to discuss their case but Matthew, originally a suspect, has become a vigilante in the search for Cassandra.

This entire time Cassandra has been held captive in the home of a child pornographer named Mika, who has installed remote cameras in the hotel rooms where Tina works as a chambermaid. Although Mika leaves his house to work and is no longer sexually interested in the now-adult Cassandra, the fear that he will harm her parents keeps Cassandra from escaping or seeking help.

Jeffrey finds recent photos of Cassandra online. Mika makes her tell stories on camera to lure in younger children. Nicole poses as a child, which allows her and Jeffrey to catch a child molester named Willy, as well as a group of others. The arrests put Nicole in the public eye. Mika visits Willy in prison and urges him not to take any deals for cooperation. Willy says he will only comply if someone kidnaps Nicole and forces her to reveal what in her past may have inspired her to pursue child protection.

Cassandra begins chatting online with a young girl, trying to entice her to meet. When Nicole arrives home, she finds Jeffrey using his own niece as bait to infiltrate the child porn community and immediately shuts off the webcam. Mika secretly turns the webcam back on to watch their fight and reconsiders Willy's offer regarding Nicole.

Nicole attends a dinner held in her honor where she is drugged and kidnapped by Vicky, a woman working for Mika.

While transporting trees in his truck, Matthew stays overnight at a motel. He wakes to find the trees have been taken and left in a trail that ultimately leads him to a remote location where he finds Cassandra. Cassandra resists leaving with him and Matthew does not understand why until Mika appears and tranquilizes him; Mika had arranged the meeting to watch their reunion.

Mika locks Nicole in a van and tells her to tell her story in a microphone.

At the ice skating rink, Vicky questions Cassandra's former skating partner, Albert, about their history, pressuring him for details on how he was impacted by the disappearance. Matthew overhears this and follows Vicky to a restaurant, where he eavesdrops as Vicky plays a recording of her conversation with Albert for Mika. Matthew calls Jeffrey with their location and plants his GPS-enabled phone on Mika's vehicle.

Matthew goads the diner staff to call the police by being disruptive. He confronts the abductors to buy more time and steals Vicky's cell phone. She and Mika chase Matthew in their vehicle, shooting at his truck. Matthew escapes by driving by the diner again, where multiple police cars have responded to the staff's earlier calls.

Jeffrey tracks Matthew's phone and locates Mika's house. Jeffrey is shot by Vicky, but she is killed by another officer. Jeffrey then fatally wounds Mika, who dies while being interrogated for Nicole's location. The Lane family is reunited at the police station, and then Tina and Cassandra visit Jeffrey as he recovers in the hospital. The police finally find and rescue Nicole.

Cassandra skates at her old ice rink and smiles.

== Cast ==
- Ryan Reynolds as Matthew Lane
- Scott Speedman as Detective Jeffrey Cornwall
- Rosario Dawson as Detective Nicole Dunlop
- Mireille Enos as Tina Lane
- Kevin Durand as Mika
- Alexia Fast as Cassandra Lane
- Peyton Kennedy as Young Cassandra
- Bruce Greenwood as Vince
- Brendan Gall as Teddy
- Aaron Poole as Mike
- Jason Blicker as Sam
- Aidan Shipley as Albert
- Ian Matthews as Willy
- Christine Horne as Vicky
- Ella Ballentine as Jennifer
- Jim Calarco as a Manager

== Genre and themes ==
In The Captive, Atom Egoyan makes use of the codes of psychological thrillers to explore how a child abduction erodes the bonds between the protagonists, echoing the themes of The Sweet Hereafter, his most acclaimed film, about the despair of a small community shocked by the accidental death of its children, a theme that revolved around the suffering and guilt complex of the parents: "The subject of the family is a highly emotional one for me and is central to my work." Also in common with The Sweet Hereafter, the film is wintry and "pensive" in tone and given to literary allusion: the earlier film made use of the Pied Piper legend, Mozart's The Magic Flute is quoted in The Captive, and served as the starting point for the screenplay, originally titled The Queen of the Night: according to Egoyan, Mika sees himself as Sarastro, part of a secret society, projecting on to his captive's mother the idea of attachment to superstition. "He has created this world for himself... feel[ing] incredibly proud... Yet, there's something broken in him as well because the person that he has held captive after all these years is not drawn to him." Cass herself is named after Cassandra, the figure from Greek mythology.

Egoyan also stated that characters in this film make "wrong choices", and that it contrasts men's weakness and women's strength.

Scout Tafoya suggests that the film is a meditation on the effects of social media on the psyche: "Intimacy, safety and order have all lost their meaning in an age where voyeurism is part of everyday life... 24 hour access to pornography and violent video content, to say nothing of the contents of other people's lives via Facebook, Instagram and Twitter, has congealed into a kind of societal numbness. What do you do when you get bored of everything? Start playing god and treating other people like characters in a story you’re writing."

== Production ==
=== Inspiration and writing ===
In interviews with Canadian film critic Richard Crouse and Anne-Katrin Titze, Egoyan revealed that his initial inspiration for The Captive was missing children posters in his hometown of Victoria, British Columbia, and news of a pedophile ring in Cornwall, Ontario: "When the results... were announced I just found it so troubling... I started writing this script in 2009 and put it aside for a while because it just felt too dark..." Seventeen individuals had come forward in the Cornwall case, deliberately referenced by Egoyan's naming one of the detectives Cornwall. They claimed that they were part of a ring consisting of Cornwall's most powerful lawyers, priests and teachers. A C$50 million public inquiry ensued and, it could not find that anything had occurred. "They couldn't say if there was or wasn't a ring. The ambiguity and the horror of these lives! This one detective was outraged and publicly said, 'there was this ring, how can we not indict these people?' He was completely ostracised by his cohorts."

Egoyan ultimately developed the story as centring on three couples: the parents, the detectives working on the case, and finally the girl and her abductor. Egoyan enlisted the help of crime novelist David Fraser to co-write the script and also met with crime investigators in Waterloo, Ontario. In preparation for the film, the director met a number of investigators in the fight against child pornography.

=== Casting ===
Egoyan decided he would like to cast Ryan Reynolds after seeing his work in Safe House. It was announced in August 2012 that Reynolds would be starring in the film, then titled The Queen of the Night. Scott Speedman and Mireille Enos joined the cast in December. The casting of the detective played by Rosario Dawson was announced in January 2013. Kevin Durand and Alexia Fast were announced as joining the cast later the same month, while Bruce Greenwood's casting was announced in February. Rehearsals took place in New York City.

=== Financing, principal photography, and retitling ===
The film received funding from Telefilm Canada, as well as C$1 million from the Northern Ontario Heritage Fund. Shooting began in February 2013 in Sudbury, Ontario, moving to Niagara Falls and Toronto the following month. Egoyan enjoys stories which involve the audience and which force them to self-reflect. For The Captive, He set out to "confuse things" by interspersing including CCTV sequences.

In October, it was announced that the film had been retitled as The Captive. In Québec, the film was released as La Captive, whereas in France it had been released as Captives to distinguish it from Chantal Akerman's film.

== Release ==
Ahead of its première in competition for the Palme d'Or on 16 May 2014 at the Cannes Film Festival, distributor A24, in partnership with DirecTV, purchased the U.S. rights to the film. Following the advice of eOne, Egoyan decided not to screen the film at the Toronto International Film Festival. The film received a limited theatrical release in Canada, premiering on 5 September 2014.

ARP Selection distributed the film in France, whereas deals were signed by Canadian distributor eOne with Germany (Ascot Elite), Scandinavia (Scanbox), Russia (Luxor), China (HGC Global Communications), Middle East, India, Turkey and Romania (Tanweer), Greece (Odeon), Switzerland (Ascot Elite), Portugal (Lusomundo), Poland (Monolith) and the countries of the former Yugoslavia (Discovery). The film had an American theatrical release in New York and Los Angeles late on 12 and 19 December respectively.

The film was released on DirecTV on 13 November 2014 due to A24's partnership with DirecTV, weeks ahead of the American limited theatrical release and on demand beginning on 12 December 2014. The film was first made available to stream on Netflix and HBO Max in January 2014.

In 2026, The Captive achieved significant viewership on Netflix. Monica Conman writes that it debuted on U.S. charts on 13 March in eighth place, and having broken the Top 10, it reached fifth place the following day. It dropped to ninth most popular film by 16 March, where it remained through the week of 18-24 March. Jeremy Smith attributes the sudden interest in the film to contemporary focus on Jeffrey Epstein's child trafficking ring.

== Reception ==
=== Box office ===
The Captive earned a total of $1 million domestically and another $1 million outside of Canada. The Captive was Egoyan's strongest opening week as of that release ($407,804).

=== Critical response ===
==== Contemporary ====
The Captive has a Rotten Tomatoes rating of 28% based on 53 reviews, with an average score of 4.3/10. The website's critics consensus reads, "Wan and lugubrious, The Captive represents another atmospheric, beautifully filmed misfire from director Atom Egoyan." The film's Metacritic score is 36 out of 100 based on 20 reviews, indicating "generally unfavorable reviews". Sam Adams remarked that many critics who watched the premiere compared it unfavourably with Denis Villeneuve's Prisoners, released a year earlier, but that "the harshest comparisons" were to Egoyan's past films, evidence of a "precipitous downward slide", referencing the director's recent Devil's Knot, which opened the week before "to resoundingly negative reviews."

Justin Chang from Variety described it as "a ludicrous abduction thriller that finds a once-great filmmaker slipping into previously un-entered realms of self-parody". Peter Bradshaw from The Guardian commented, "it looks worryingly as if Egoyan has taken a serious issue and burdened it to breaking point and beyond with his own indulgent, naïve and exploitative fantasies". Steven Zeitchik of the Los Angeles Times compliments moments when the film "hints at emotions and mysteries with a delightful subtlety for a while", but remarks that it includes "some wild plots and conspiracies that wouldn't be out of place in the most fantastical spy novel".

Alex Heeney praised the film's cinematography but faulted the script: "it tries to balance six protagonists who should be dealing with complicated emotions, while also hitting all the marks of a thriller. Egoyan does some top notch directing to keep the tension heightened, making the film work as a genre piece. The constant suspense can keep you from thinking too hard about the vacuousness of the characters, making it an OK film that’s only worth seeing once. It’s a shame because there are a lot of good ideas here, and it’s a chilling concept that deserves further explanation."

Robbie Collin of The Telegraph gave the film a very positive review, calling it Atom Egoyan's best film since The Sweet Hereafter. Jonathan Romney, writing for Screen Daily, said Egoyan was "visibly at ease" with the themes of online child pornography, and that the film managed to "unsettle, and to convey emotional tremors even while playing its games"." Romney expected that the film's narrative and stylistic elegance as well as a strong cast would make it the director's most widely appreciated film for some time, while conceding that "some viewers may object on grounds of taste to such a ludic - and to a degree, coolly detached - entertainment being drawn from such sombre subject matter."

In Maclean's, a Canadian critic who also found fault with the film nevertheless concluded along with their colleagues that "Cannes had no business leading The Captive to slaughter in the main competition in the first place... Egoyan's new film is clearly miscast on that lofty altar, and the festival's programmers did everyone—especially Egoyan—a gross disservice by placing it there."

Reviewing the film for RogerEbert.com months later, Scout Tafoya gave it 3 stars out of 4, praising the cinematography, sound design, and performances, and suggested that sometimes, an "audience rejecting your work might be a sign that you've hit a nerve and produced something they can’t process."

==== Director's response and retrospective ====
Egoyan was "stunned" by the negative reviews (excepting Collin's) immediately following the Cannes premiere: "A lot of the reviews were just really cruel. I don't understand the charge of it being exploitative because it actually goes to great pains not to be exploitative at all... It was a pretty extreme reaction." He added: "I wasn't there at the press screening so I don't actually know what happened that morning, but the evening screening was a huge success. We had a total standing ovation. But the morning was obviously like my worst nightmare." Ten years later, he said he had been so "traumatized" by the experience that he vowed never to return to Cannes with a film again.

Egoyan also suggested that The Captive had gained fresh resonance in the light of revelations about the American financier and sexual predator Jeffrey Epstein: "In terms of this incredible crazy cabal that we found out about his life after this, it makes more sense now."

Writing for Netflix Life during the film's rise in popularity on the streaming service in 2026, Crystal George suggests that the film may have been dismissed too quickly by its harshest critics, that its slow, methodical approach demands patience, but also "creates an atmosphere of tension and dread." Rather than offer "easy answers or comforting resolutions", it forces viewers to sit with the anguish of its characters. That's the grief, the guilt, and the desperate hope that maybe, somehow, the truth will lead to redemption. That emotional weight is precisely what makes the film so haunting."
