= Guest of Honour (2019 film) =

Canadian drama film by Atom Egoyan

- Official release poster
- Directed by: Atom Egoyan
- Written by: Atom Egoyan
- Produced by: Atom Egoyan; Jennifer Weiss; Simone Urdl
- Starring: David Thewlis; Laysla De Oliveira; Rossif Sutherland; Alexandre Bourgeois; Arsinée Khanjian; Luke Wilson
- Cinematography: Paul Sarossy
- Edited by: Susan Shipton
- Music by: Mychael Danna
- Production companies: Telefilm Canada; The Film Farm; Ego Film Arts; Playtime; Ontario Creates
- Distributed by: Elevation Pictures
- Release dates: September 3, 2019 (Venice); July 10, 2020 (Canada)
- Running time: 105 minutes
- Country: Canada
- Language: English

Guest of Honour is a 2019 Canadian drama film, written, directed, and produced by Atom Egoyan. It stars David Thewlis, Laysla De Oliveira, Rossif Sutherland, Alexandre Bourgeois, Arsinée Khanjian and Luke Wilson. De Oliveira stars as a high school music teacher who demands to be imprisoned for a crime that she did not commit to atone for her previous sins. Meanwhile, her health inspector father, played by Thewlis, attempts to secure her early release.

The film had its world premiere at the 76th Venice International Film Festival on September 3, 2019. It was released on July 10, 2020, by Elevation Pictures.

== Plot ==
An eight year old Veronica is given music lessons by single mother Alicia in her private residence, where she also teaches her son Walter. Around this time, Veronica's mother, Roseangela, became terminally ill, and Veronica's father, Jim, and Alicia began developing a romantic relationship, which was resented by Veronica, as she viewed it as Jim having an affair while Roseangela was still alive. One day, Veronica sees Alicia asleep on a couch with a lit cigarette in her hand, causing a fire that Veronica witnesses, but does not stop, allowing Alicia to burn to death. Veronica and Walter, who performed at recitals together as children, later become romantically involved when they are teenagers, but he later becomes aware of the circumstances regarding his mother's death, causing him to commit suicide.

Years later, Mike, a high school bus driver and chaperone, becomes spiteful of student Clive's romantic interest in Veronica (who is now a music teacher) and her rejection of his own advances. Mike then instigates a hoax that leads to Veronica's arrest for seemingly sexually abusing Clive. She enters a plea deal and resists any attempt from Jim to secure her release from prison, with her desire to be imprisoned stemming from the guilt she has over Walter and Alicia's deaths. Jim, a strict health inspector, visits a restaurant owned by Clive's family, and threatens Clive's grandfather with a shutdown unless he is given an opportunity to speak privately with Clive. During a tense conversation, Clive reveals the truth to Jim, and also tells Jim that he knows Veronica felt responsible for Walter's suicide.

Later that night, Jim finds out that he is the guest of honour at a private event at an Armenian restaurant named Wild Orchid. An inebriated Jim is then invited to give a speech, where he decides to express his anguish to the unknowing guests regarding Veronica's imprisonment, and his desire to kill Mike, leading to him being interrogated by the police the next day. During the interrogation, Jim notices that the family's pet rabbit Benjamin, who was given to Veronica as a gift when she was nine, has suddenly died in his cage at the improbable age of 16. He returns to Wild Orchid demanding that the staff cut off Benjamin's feet so that he can keep them as good luck charms. Jim tells Veronica in prison that the police are now suspicious of his regular visits because he and Veronica may be plotting to murder Mike. Veronica excitedly asks if this means her sentence will be extended even further, explaining to a bewildered Jim that everything he has done, and everything she saw and endured as a child, is what is wrong with her, but also what is right with her.

Veronica, who has since been released, meets with a priest, Father Greg, to discuss funeral arrangements for a recently deceased Jim, including preparing a eulogy, which leads to Veronica recounting her life. Her conversation with Father Greg eventually leads to some closure for her regarding the deaths of Walter and Alicia, as she begins to come to terms with the true nature of Jim's relationship with Alicia and the traumatic incidents which have occurred throughout her life, and she begins to re-frame her perception of them. It is revealed that Veronica's recollection of what was going on between Alicia and Jim was mostly correct, but severely distorted.

At Jim's funeral, Father Greg tells a story about having met Jim briefly at Alicia's funeral, and how he told Father Greg about how important she was to Veronica's musical education. Father Greg asks the parishioners in attendance to mourn the deaths of both Jim and Alicia. Veronica, now in possession of the good luck charms made from Benjamin's feet, asks Father Greg to place the charms in the casket with Jim's body after first keeping one for herself and gifting another to Father Greg. A flashback to when Veronica was a music teacher shows her introducing the final piece of music on a program by explaining that it is a tune she wrote during a difficult time in her childhood, which is implied to have been shortly before Alicia's death.

== Cast ==
- David Thewlis as Jim
- Luke Wilson as Father Greg
- Laysla De Oliveira as Veronica
- Rossif Sutherland as Mike
- Arsinée Khanjian as Anna
- Alexandre Bourgeois as Clive
- Gage Munroe as Walter
- Tennille Read as Roseangela
- Isabelle Franca as Young Veronica
- Alexander Marsh as Young Walter
- Tony Nardi as Luigi

== Production ==
In September 2018, it was announced Atom Egoyan would direct the film from a screenplay he wrote. Egoyan, Jennifer Weiss and Simone Urdl will produce the film under their The Film Farm and Ego Film Art banners, respectively. Telefilm Canada will also produce the film, while Elevation Pictures will distribute. In November 2018, David Thewlis, Luke Wilson, Laysla De Oliveira, Rossif Sutherland and Alexandre Bourgeois joined the cast of the film.

=== Filming ===
Principal photography began in November 2018. The film was shot on location in Hamilton and Toronto, Ontario.

== Release ==
The film had its world premiere at the 76th Venice International Film Festival on September 3, 2019. It also screened at the Toronto International Film Festival on September 10, 2019. and the BFI London Film Festival on October 8, 2019.

In February 2020, Kino Lorber acquired U.S. distribution rights to the film. It was released in the United States and Canada on July 10, 2020.

== Critical reception ==
Guest of Honour holds a 42% approval rating on the review aggregator website Rotten Tomatoes, based on 65 reviews, with an average of 5.4/10. The site's critical consensus reads, "David Thewlis' performance aside, Guest of Honour serves as a frustratingly limited return to form for writer-director Atom Egoyan." On Metacritic, the film holds a rating of 53 out of 100, based on 13 critics, indicating "mixed or average reviews".
