= Simone Urdl =

Canadian film producer

Simone Urdl is a film producer. She co-founded Film Farm Productions with Jennifer Weiss.

== Filmography ==
- Jack and Jill (1998)
- Soul Cages (1999)
- Luck (2003)
- Away From Her (2006)
- Queen of the Night (2014)
- Octavio Is Dead! (2018)
- Falls Around Her (2018)
- Guest of Honour (2019)
- The Middle Man (2021)

== Recognition ==
- 2008 Genie Award for Best Motion Picture - Away from Her - Won (shared with Daniel Iron, Jennifer Weiss)
- 2001 Genie Award for Best Live Action Short Drama - Soul Cages - Nominated (shared with Phillip Barker)
