= Canadian Society of Cinematographers =

Canadian trade organization

Canadian Society of Cinematographers Société canadienne des cinéastes
- Abbreviation: CSC / SCC
- Founded: 1957
- Type: Non-profit organization
- Legal status: active
- Purpose: promotion of cinematography, recognition of motion imaging professionals
- Headquarters: Toronto, Ontario, Canada
- Region served: Canada
- Members: 800+
- Official language: English, French
- President: Zoe Dirse csc
- Website: http://www.csc.ca/

The Canadian Society of Cinematographers (CSC) (French: Société canadienne des cinéastes) is a non-profit Canadian trade organization with over 500 members whose mission is to promote the artistic creativity and required skills for cinematography. Members of the Canadian Society of Cinematographers have achieved National recognition for their work in various areas of film: feature films, documentaries, television series, specials and commercials. Fully accredited members to this society are permitted to put the letters C.S.C. or csc after their names.

The Canadian Society of Cinematographers hosts an annual Awards Gala in Toronto, Ontario, that recognizes the accomplishments of Canadian cinematographers. In 2017, they celebrated their 60th anniversary of the CSC Awards Gala.

== History ==
The idea to form the Canadian Society of Cinematographers originated from the inspiration of four cameramen: Herbert Alpert csc asc, M. Jackson-Samuels csc, Fritz Spiess csc and Bob Brooks csc. In 1957, the cameramen decided to create an organization specifically designated for the art of cinematography after crossing paths numerous times in the lobby of a film studio at Woodbine and Danforth (then known as Meridian Films) in the east end of Toronto. The society's goal was to be synonymous in Canada with the American Society of Cinematographers.

The Federal Government officially recognized the society in 1960. The CSC served on the advisory committee for the Canadian Film Development Corporation (now known as Telefilm Canada).

== Mission ==
The Canadian Society of Cinematographers is a non-profit Canadian trade organization with over 500 members whose mission is to promote the artistic creativity and required skills for cinematography.

With Corporate Sponsorship and the help of leaders within the organization, the Canadian Society of Cinematographers fulfills its mission by:

- Training its active members
- Educating its active members
- Disseminating the latest information in technology and product to its active members

== Organization ==
The Canadian Society of Cinematographers consists of:

- Canadian hubs located in Toronto, Montreal, Winnipeg and Vancouver.
- approximately 800+ members
- volunteer positions, usually performed by its active members

The Canadian Society of Cinematographers has 11 members elected to their board of directors, who each possess unique qualities and skills that contribute to the organization.

The board of directors elects two individuals as chief officers, and they are:

- President: Zoe Dirse csc
- Board Chair: Guy Godfree csc
- Executive Director, Operations: Lucy Kayumov and Executive Director, Strategy & Vision: Byron Kent Wong

== Sponsorship ==
The Canadian Society of Cinematographers is a non-profit organization that relies on the support of corporate sponsors in order to serve their membership.

Some of their sponsors include: AC Lighting Inc., Aputure, Cooke Optics, Canon Canada Inc., Codes Pro-Media, Dazmo Camera, Fuji Film Canada, Henry's, Nikon Canada, Panasonic Canada, and Sony of Canada.

The full list of the Canadian Society of Cinematographers' corporate sponsors and contact information can be found on their website.

== Awards ==
Every year, the Canadian Society of Cinematographers hosts an Awards Gala in Toronto, ON to honour the works and achievement of Canadian cinematographers in the industry. In 2017, the CSC celebrated their 60th anniversary of the CSC Awards Gala Their award categories are divided into sections, which are:

- Special Awards and Honours
- Director of Photography Categories
- Cinematographer Categories

Each section contains multiple awards that may be given out to recipients each year.

== Publications ==
In 1962, the Canadian Society of Cinematographers published a magazine called Canadian Cinematography, whose name changed to Cinema Canada in 1967. In 1989, the Canadian Society of Cinematographers changed the name of their magazine from Cinema Canada to the current title which is now called Canadian Cinematographer

== See also ==
- American Society of Cinematographers
- British Society of Cinematographers
- Australian Cinematographers Society
