= Atom Egoyan =

Canadian filmmaker (born 1960)

Atom Egoyan CC
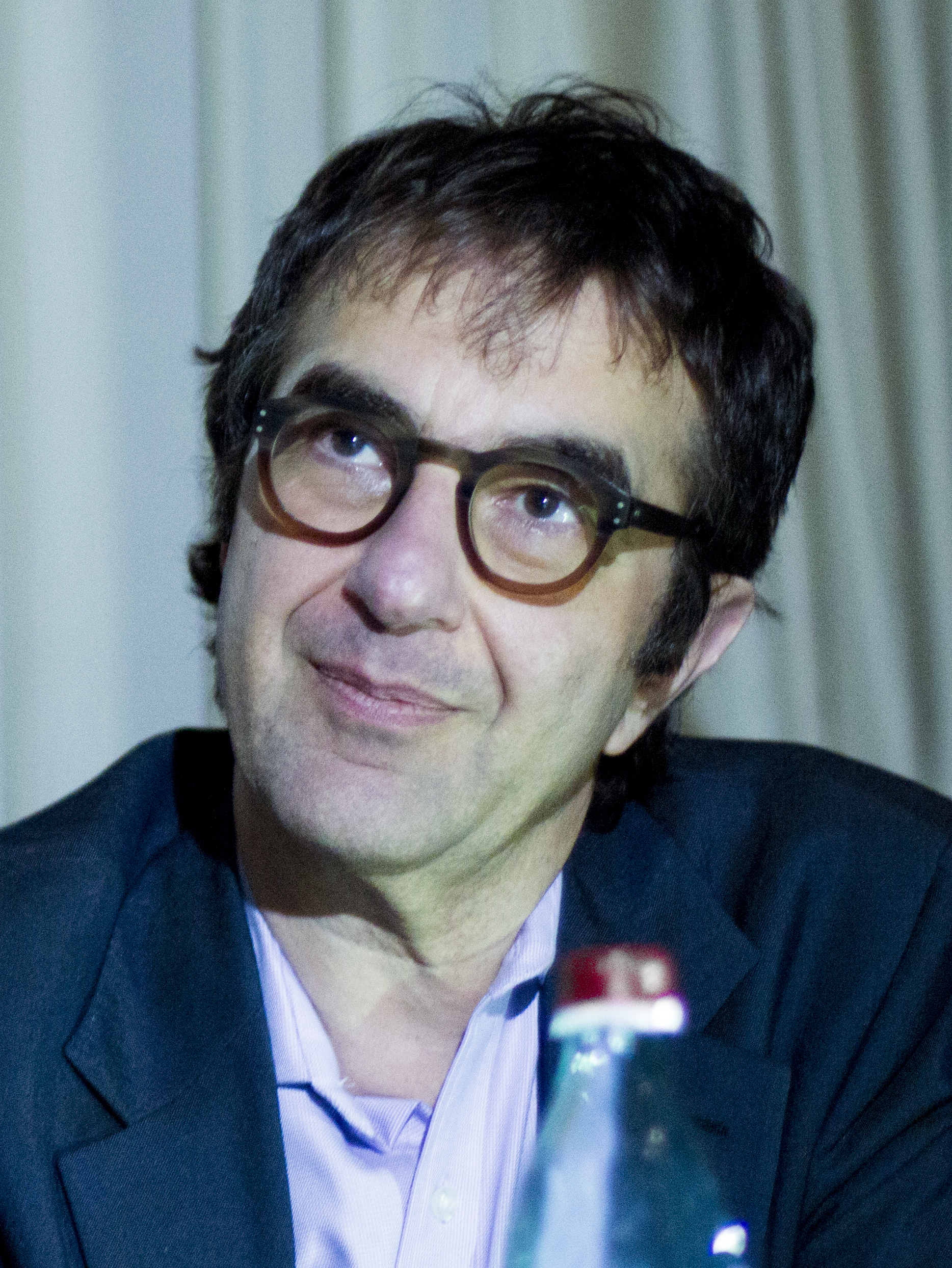
- Egoyan in 2016
- Born: Atom Yeghoyan; July 19, 1960 (age 66); Cairo, United Arab Republic
- Citizenship: Canada; Armenia (from 2018)
- Education: Trinity College, Toronto
- Occupations: Film director; screenwriter; producer
- Years active: 1984–present
- Spouse: Arsinée Khanjian
- Children: 1
- Website: www.egofilmarts.com

Atom Egoyan CC (/ɛˈɡɔɪən/; Armenian: Ատոմ Եղոյեան, romanized: Atom Yeghoyan; born July 19, 1960) is an Armenian-Canadian filmmaker. One of the most preeminent directors of the Toronto New Wave, he emerged during the 1980s and made his career breakthrough with Exotica (1994), a hyperlink film set in a strip club. He followed this with his most critically acclaimed film, The Sweet Hereafter (1997), an adaptation of the Russell Banks novel of the same name, for which he received Academy Award nominations for Best Director and Best Adapted Screenplay.

Egoyan's other significant films include The Adjuster (1991), Ararat (2002), Where the Truth Lies (2005), Adoration (2008), Chloe (2009), Devil's Knot (2013), and Remember (2015). His works often explore themes of alienation and isolation, featuring characters whose interactions are mediated through technology, bureaucracy, or other power structures. His films often follow non-linear plot structures, in which events are placed out of sequence in order to elicit specific emotional reactions from the audience by withholding key information. Many of his films also draw on his experiences as a first-generation immigrant, and as a member of the Armenian diaspora.

In addition to his Oscar nods, Egoyan has won eight Genie/Canadian Screen Awards, out of 25 total nominations. He received the 2008 Dan David Prize for "Creative Rendering of the Past" and the 2015 Governor General's Performing Arts Award. He has been a member of the Order of Canada since 1999, and was ascended to Companion in 2015.

Egoyan is married to actress Arsinée Khanjian, whom he has often cast in his films.

== Early life and education ==
Egoyan was born Atom Yeghoyan on July 19, 1960, in Cairo, in what was then the United Arab Republic, to Armenian-Egyptian painters Shushan (née Devletian) and Joseph Yeghoyan. He was named Atom to mark the completion of Egypt's first nuclear reactor. Egoyan has a younger sister, Eve.

In 1963, because of a rise in Arab nationalism, the family left Cairo and moved to Victoria, British Columbia, in Canada. They changed their last name to Egoyan.

As a teenager, Egoyan became interested in reading and writing plays. Influences included Samuel Beckett and Harold Pinter. He also attributes his future in the film industry to Ingmar Bergman's Persona (1966), which he viewed at age 14, according to an interview he had with journalist Robert K. Elder for The Film That Changed My Life:

It gave me an incredible respect for the medium and its possibilities. To me, Persona marries a pure form and a very profound vision with absolute conviction. It's very inspiring. I felt that it was able to open a door that wasn't there before.

Egoyan graduated from Trinity College at the University of Toronto. It was at Trinity College that he came into contact with Harold Nahabedian, the Armenian-Canadian Anglican Chaplain of Trinity College. In interviews, Egoyan credited Nahabedian for introducing him to the language and history of his ethnic heritage. Egoyan wrote for the University of Toronto's independent weekly, The Newspaper, during his time at the school.

== Career ==
Egoyan began making films in the early 1980s; his debut film Next of Kin (1984) had a world premier at the International Filmfestival Mannheim-Heidelberg and won a major prize. The next year he directed the 1985 Twilight Zone episode "The Wall", written by J. Michael Straczynski.

His commercial breakthrough came with his film Exotica (1994). He received the Grand Prix (Belgian Film Critics Association) in Brussels, the FIPRESCI Jury Prize at the Cannes Film Festival, and Best Motion Picture at the Canadian Screen Awards (then called the Genie Awards).

Egoyan's first attempt at adapted material resulted in his best-known work, the highly praised The Sweet Hereafter (1997). It earned him three prizes at the 50th Cannes Film Festival: the Grand Prix, the FIPRESCI Jury Prize, and the Prize of the Ecumenical Jury. The film also earned Egoyan Academy Award nominations for Best Director and Best Adapted Screenplay.

Beginning in 1996, Egoyan has directed several operas, including Salome, Così fan tutte, Jenůfa, and The Ring Cycle, at the Canadian Opera, Vancouver Opera, Pacific Opera Victoria, and elsewhere.

The film Ararat (2002) generated much publicity for Egoyan. After Henri Verneuil's French-language film Mayrig (1991), it was the first major motion picture to deal directly with the Armenian genocide. Ararat later won the award for Best Motion Picture at the Canadian Screen Awards, marking Egoyan's third win. The film was released in over 30 countries around the world.

In 2004, Egoyan opened Camera Bar, a 50-seat cinema-lounge on Queen Street West in Toronto. The bar closed in 2006.

Beginning in September 2006, Egoyan taught at the University of Toronto for three years. He joined the Faculty of Arts and Science as the Dean's Distinguished Visitor in theatre, film, music, and visual studies. He subsequently taught at Ryerson University. In 2006, he received the Master of Cinema Award of the International Filmfestival Mannheim-Heidelberg.

His film Adoration (2008) has been adapted into an opera by Mary Kouyoumdjian and librettist Royce Vavrek. It premiered in New York in 2024 and is set to be presented again by LA Opera in 2025.

In 2009, he directed the erotic thriller Chloe, which was theatrically released by Sony Pictures Classics on March 26, 2010. This film grossed $3 million in limited theatrical release in the United States, which was generally considered respectable for an arthouse film release in the early 2010's. Several months after the DVD/Blu-ray release of Chloe, Egoyan said that Chloe had made more money than any of his previous films. The success of Chloe led Egoyan to receive many scripts of erotic thrillers.

In 2012, he directed a production of Martin Crimp's Cruel and Tender, after winning the Irish Times/ESB Award for Best Director for his production of Samuel Beckett’s Eh Joe, starring Michael Gambon and Penelope Wilton in Dublin. In 2025, he directed his original play Donation for the Maxim Gorki Theater in Berlin and his production of Jenůfa for Opéra de Montréal at La Place des Arts.

After the release of the West Memphis Three from 18 years in prison, Egoyan directed a movie about the case called Devil's Knot (2013) starring Reese Witherspoon and Colin Firth, based on a book, Devil's Knot: The True Story of the West Memphis Three by Mara Leveritt. His next feature, The Captive (2014), starred Ryan Reynolds and screened in competition for the Palme d'Or at the 2014 Cannes Film Festival, where it received largely negative reviews from critics. Justin Chang from Variety described the film as "a ludicrous abduction thriller that finds a once-great filmmaker slipping into previously un-entered realms of self-parody."

In 2015, Egoyan directed the thriller Remember, which starred Christopher Plummer and premiered at the Toronto International Film Festival in September, before being given a limited release in theatres. His 2019 drama Guest of Honour, was nominated for a Golden Lion in competition in Venice in 2019, had a Special Presentation at the Toronto International Film Festival, and opening night galas in Vancouver and Montreal. His latest film is Seven Veils (2023); the film was a Toronto International Film Festival (TIFF) Official Selection with a special advance premiere at the Canadian Opera Company’s theatre, the Four Seasons Centre for the Performing Arts.

In 2023, Egoyan premiered Seven Veils at the Toronto International Film Festival. The film, starring Amanda Seyfried, continues his exploration of trauma, performance, and identity in the arts.

He has also occasionally appeared in films as an actor, most notably in his own film Calendar and Jean Pierre Lefebvre's The Box of Sun (La boîte à soleil).

== Personal life ==
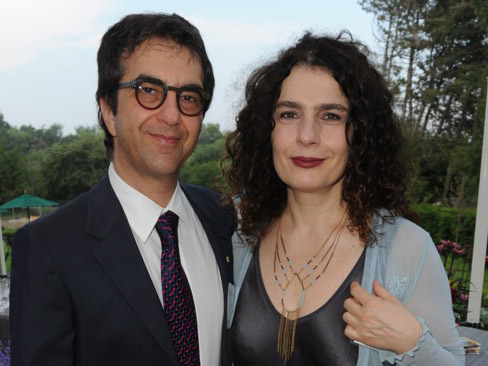
Egoyan with his wife Arsinée Khanjian in 2013

Egoyan is based in Toronto, where he lives with his wife, actress Arsinée Khanjian, who appears in many of his films, and their son, Arshile.

In 1999, Egoyan was made an Officer of the Order of Canada; he was promoted in 2015 to Companion of the Order of Canada, the highest grade of the honour. In 2009, he won the 'Master of Cinema' award from the Mannheim Film Festival, 25 years after receiving his international festival premiere at the same event. In 2017, Egoyan was presented with the Lifetime Achievement Award at the International Film Festival of India.

== Filmography ==
=== Feature films ===
Year	Title	Director	Writer	Producer
1984	Next of Kin	Yes	Yes	Yes
1987	Family Viewing	Yes	Yes	Uncredited
1989	Speaking Parts	Yes	Yes	Yes
1991	The Adjuster	Yes	Yes	Yes
1993	Calendar	Yes	Yes	Yes
1994	Exotica	Yes	Yes	Yes
1997	The Sweet Hereafter	Yes	Yes	Yes
1999	Felicia's Journey	Yes	Yes	No
2002	Ararat	Yes	Yes	Yes
2005	Where the Truth Lies	Yes	Yes	Executive
2006	Citadel	Yes	Yes	Yes
2008	Adoration	Yes	Yes	Yes
2009	Chloe	Yes	No	No
2013	Devil's Knot	Yes	No	No
2014	The Captive	Yes	Yes	Yes
2015	Remember	Yes	No	No
2019	Guest of Honour	Yes	Yes	Yes
2023	Seven Veils	Yes	Yes	Yes

==== Executive producer only ====
Year	Title	Notes
1995	Curtis's Charm	
1998	Jack and Jill	
2002	Gambling, Gods and LSD	Documentary film
2003	The Saddest Music in the World	
2003	Foolproof	
2005	Sabah	
2005	Mouth to Mouth	
2006	Away from Her	
2025	While the Green Grass Grows: A Diary in Seven Parts	Documentary film

=== Short films ===
Year	Title	Director	Writer	Notes
1979	Howard in Particular	Yes	Yes	
1980	After Grad with Dad	Yes	Yes	
1981	Peep Show	Yes	Yes	
1982	Open House	Yes	Yes	
1985	Men: A Passion Playground	Yes	No	
1991	En passant (In Passing)	Yes	Yes	Segment of Montreal Stories
1995	A Portrait of Arshile	Yes	Yes	
2000	The Line	Yes	Yes	Segment of Preludes
2001	Diaspora	Yes	No	
2007	Artaud Double Bill	Yes	Yes	Segment To Each His Own Cinema
2013	Butterfly	Yes	No	Segment of Venezia 70 Future Reload

=== TV films ===
Year	Title	Director	Writer	Producer
1986	In This Corner	Yes	No	No
1993	Gross Misconduct: The Life of Brian Spencer	Yes	No	No
1997	Inspired by Bach: Sarabande	Yes	Yes	Yes
1988	Inside Stories: Looking for Nothing	Yes	Yes	No
2000	Krapp's Last Tape	Yes	No	No

== Awards ==
Year	Title	Award
1984	Next of Kin	Won prizes at International Filmfestival Mannheim-Heidelberg; nominated for Best Direction Genie Award
1987	Family Viewing	Won the Prize of the Ecumenical Jury at Locarno International Film Festival (1988)
1989	Speaking Parts	Best Motion Picture nomination, including five others, at the 1989 Genie Awards
1991	The Adjuster	Won the Special Silver St. George at the 17th Moscow International Film Festival, Best Canadian Film and Best Ontario Picture at Cinefest Sudbury (1991)
1993	Calendar	Won the Special Jury Prize at Taormina International Film Festival (1993)
1994	Exotica	Won the FIPRESCI Prize at the 1994 Cannes Film Festival
1997	The Sweet Hereafter	Won Grand Prize of the Jury, FIPRESCI Jury and Ecumenical Jury Prizes at the 1997 Cannes Film Festival
1999	Felicia's Journey	Won the Best Adapted Screenplay at Genie Awards (2000)
2002	Ararat	Won Best Motion Picture at the 2003 Genie Awards; also won Genies for costume design and original score; in addition, Arsinée Khanjian won the best actress award and Elias Koteas best supporting actor at the 2003 Genie Awards; also won the Writers Guild of Canada award in 2003
2005	Where the Truth Lies	Won the Best Adapted Screenplay at Genie Awards (2006)
2008	Adoration	Won the Prize of the Ecumenical Jury at the 2008 Cannes Film Festival, Best Canadian Feature Film – Special Jury Citation at Toronto International Film Festival (2008)
2009	Chloe	Nominated for the DGC Craft Award at the Directors Guild of Canada (2010)
2013	Devil's Knot	Nominated for the Best Film Golden Seashell Award at San Sebastián International Film Festival (2013)
2014	The Captive	Palme d'Or nomination at the 2014 Cannes Film Festival
2015	Remember	Won the Vittorio Veneto Film Festival Award – Venice Film Festival (2015)
2019	Guest of Honour	Nominated for the Golden Lion (Leone d'Oro) at the Venice Film Festival, opening nights at the Vancouver International Film Festival and the Festival du nouveau cinéma
2023	Seven Veils	Avant Première, Toronto International Film Festival (2023); Special Gala, Berlin International Film Festival (2024); Opening Night Film, Yerevan International Film Festival (2024); Opening Night & Best Canadian Film, Victoria Film Festival (2024); Opening Night Film, International Film Festival of Ottawa (2024); Nominated for Adapted Screenplay and Achievement in Direction, Academy of Canadian Cinema & Television (2024).

== Bibliography ==
- Dear Sandra, Volumina (2007)
