= CIA activities in Canada =

It has been traditionally believed that any U.S. Central Intelligence Agency activity in Canada would be undertaken with the "general consent" of the Canadian government, and through the 1950s information was freely given to the CIA in return for information from the United States. However, traditionally Canada has refused to voice any anger even when it was clear that the CIA was operating without authorization.

Proponents have noted that Canada was vital to CIA operations as it "physically occupied the territory between the United States and the Soviet Union. However, on May 28, 1975 Solicitor General Warren Allmand directed the Royal Canadian Mounted Police (RCMP) to begin investigating the levels of CIA involvement in Canadian affairs.

Canada continues to cooperate with the CIA today, allowing ghost planes to land and refuel in Canada, en route to delivering prisoners to suspected CIA black sites. The Canadian counterpart of the CIA is the Canadian Security Intelligence Service (CSIS) and its agency heavily cooperates with the CIA.

== Project MKULTRA ==
The CIA convinced the Allan Memorial Institute to allow a series of mind control tests on nine patients in the Montreal school, as part of their ongoing Project MKULTRA.

The experiments were exported to Canada when the CIA recruited Scottish psychiatrist Donald Ewen Cameron, creator of the "psychic driving" concept, which the CIA found particularly interesting. Cameron had been hoping to correct schizophrenia by erasing existing memories and reprogramming the psyche. He commuted from Albany, New York to Montreal every week and was paid $69,000 from 1957 to 1964 to carry out MKULTRA experiments there. In addition to LSD, Cameron also experimented with various paralytic drugs, as well as electroconvulsive therapy at thirty to forty times the normal power. His "driving" experiments consisted of putting subjects into drug-induced coma for weeks at a time (up to three months in one case) while playing tape loops of noise or simple repetitive statements. His experiments were typically carried out on patients who had entered the institute for minor problems such as anxiety disorders and postpartum depression, many of whom suffered permanently from his actions. His treatments resulted in victims' incontinence, amnesia, forgetting how to talk, forgetting their parents, and thinking their interrogators were their parents.

When lawsuits commenced in 1986, the Canadian government denied having any knowledge that Cameron was being sponsored by the CIA. The Quebec Court of Appeals has since ruled 3-0 that the US government cannot be sued in Canada for their participation in Project MKULTRA, and the Supreme Court of Canada has declined to hear the case.

In 1986 it was reported that some of the CIA's human experimentation that occurred had received funding from the Canadian government, as well.

== Operation Chaos ==
In 2007, declassified CIA documents revealed that in the 1960s and the 1970s, the CIA developed a network of informants on Canadian university campuses. They dispatched reports from Ottawa to the CIA's headquarters in Langley, Virginia. The spying mostly concerned professors and students who they believed were espousing left-wing ideas or/and that they were critical of the Vietnam War. The operation was code-named "MH Chaos". The documents also made mention of the president of the student union at the University of Simon Fraser and a political science professor, who both expressed opposition.

It was also revealed that there were instances of recruiting informants in the Cuban and Chinese embassies in Ottawa. The spies were ordered to report on US citizens who tried to obtain visas through Canada to travel to communist countries, which the US restricted travel to.

However, the CIA declassified documents did not reveal if the Canadian government was aware of these spying operations.

== Possible manipulation of political affairs ==
When the Avro Arrow aerospace program was cancelled in 1959, many believed that the CIA was partly responsible, fearing Canadian intrusion into aerospace dominance.

In 1961, the CIA wrote an intelligence estimate titled "Trends in Canadian Foreign Policy" which suggested that the Progressive Conservative government of John Diefenbaker "might take Canada in a divergent direction" and seek "a more independent foreign policy" and suggested that a return of the Liberal Party might "soften the Canadian resistance to the storage of nuclear weapons on Canadian soil". In 1967, Prime Minister Lester Pearson announced he would investigate the allegations of the CIA helping him oust Diefenbaker.

In 1982, Canadian Member of Parliament Svend Robinson accused the CIA of infiltrating the RCMP and funnelling political contributions to favoured politicians in provincial elections in Quebec, British Columbia, Alberta, Saskatchewan and Manitoba from 1970 to 1976. Additionally, on December 7, 1984, during a parliament session, Robinson accused the CIA of penetrating at senior management levels of Petro-Canada and named several individuals as CIA agents. However, on December 1984, in a committee, he retracted his remarks and said it came from a confidential source of information and that he availed himself from parliamentary immunity to accuse employees of Petro-Canada of spying for the CIA. The information seemed to arise from John H. Meier, an aide to Howard Hughes, but a secret investigation turned up no evidence of such a conspiracy. These allegations against the RCMP can be dated back to 1977, when it was shown that the RCMP was "linked" closely to the CIA.

== Intelligence collection efforts ==
In 2011, declassified CIA documents from the 1950s and from the 1970s-1980s, during the Cold War era, revealed that the CIA was doing analysis of Canadian commerce, industry and technology. Most notably, they were collecting information on Canada's natural resource industry and the foreign actors interested to be implicated in the sector (such as Japanese interest in Alberta's oil sands), cataloguing shipping trends, and keeping an eye on Canada's dealing with communist countries. A history professor from the University of Toronto said that the documents show how Americans would sometimes use clandestine methods "to find out things about Canada they want to know".

== Later development ==
By 1964, the CIA also closely monitored the Canadian wheat industry, as the United States hoped to sell wheat to the Soviet bloc countries. When the American embassy in Tehran was seized by Iranian students in 1979, Canadian diplomat Kenneth D. Taylor was made the "de facto CIA Station Chief" in the country, but kept his new position secret from Canadians.

An indication of the United States' close operational cooperation with Canada is the creation of a new message distribution label within the main US military communications network. Previously, the marking of NOFORN (i.e., no foreign nationals) required the originator to specify which, if any, non-US countries could receive the information. A new handling caveat, USA/AUS/CAN/GBR/NZL eyes only, used primarily on intelligence messages, gives an easier way to indicate that the material can be shared with the Five Eyes members.

Aware that the Canadian Khadr family knew valuable intelligence about the inner workings of al Qaeda, the CIA hired Abdurahman Khadr to act as an informant and infiltrate Islamist circles. The CIA also paid the Pakistani government $500,000 to capture and interrogate his older brother, Abdullah Khadr, ostensibly torturing him to secure answers and confessions.

As of 2006, Canada had allowed 76 CIA flights to use the country's airbases, primarily in Nunavut and Labrador, to carry prisoners from the war on terror to black sites overseas.
