= Montreal experiments =

1957–64 Canadian schizophrenia treatments

The Montreal experiments (officially MKULTRA Subproject 68) were a series of experiments, initially aimed to treat schizophrenia by changing memories and erasing the patients' thoughts using the Scottish psychiatrist Donald Ewen Cameron's method of "psychic driving", as well as drug-induced sleep, intensive electroconvulsive therapy, sensory deprivation and Thorazine. The experiments were conducted at the Allan Memorial Institute of McGill University in Montreal between 1957 and 1964 by Cameron and funded by the CIA as part of Project MKUltra, which lasted until 1973 and was only revealed to the public in 1975.

The patients in this experiment expected positive changes from Cameron's treatment. Instead, they experienced severe suffering under conditions that violated their human rights. The patients, and also their families, show long lasting effects on their mental health. Some of these symptoms include retrograde amnesia as well as impairments in everyday life abilities such as self-care.

Details of the experiments have been kept out of the public eye by the CIA, through the destruction of files or by the use of non-disclosure agreements. Whether or not Cameron was aware that funding for his experiments was coming from the CIA is unclear; it has been argued that he would have carried out the exact same experiments if funding had come from a source without ulterior motives.

== Donald Ewen Cameron ==
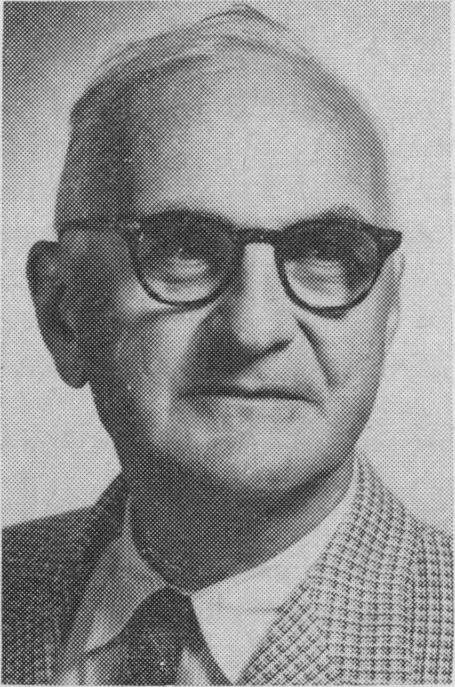
Donald Ewen Cameron, circa 1967

Donald Ewen Cameron was the key figure in the Montreal experiments. Cameron was born on December 24, 1901 in Scotland and graduated from the University of Glasgow in 1924. In 1929, he moved to Canada where he worked in the Brandon Mental Hospital in Manitoba as the physician in charge. In 1938, he received his diploma in psychiatry and became professor of neurology, psychiatry at University at Albany and began his research on sensory deprivation and memory.

In 1953, he developed his theory of "psychic driving" to cure schizophrenia which he later used on his patients under the Project MKUltra, with the codename "Subproject 68" for which he was recruited by the CIA in 1957. He was paid $69,000 through the front company "Society for the Investigation of Human Ecology" from 1957 to 1964 to carry out these experiments. Doctor Cameron's department also received grants from programs of the Canadian Federal government totaling "more than $500,000 between 1950 and 1965" for projects related to and not related to the Montreal Experiments. He suddenly left the project four years before the end of his contract.

In 1961, he became president of the World Psychiatric Association after he had already been the president of both the American Psychiatric Association as well as the Canadian Psychiatric Association.

In 1967, he died of a heart attack.

== Government Funding ==
=== Canadian Agencies ===
Cameron received funding for experiments through 3 government bodies. The National Research Council (NRC) provided funding for experiments on "psychological aspects of return to industrial civilian life" and "reactions of civilians to community disasters" from 1944-1946. The Defence Research Board (DRB) funded two projects between 1948 and 1951 respectively titled "Management of Fear and Anxiety by Civilians in the Event of a Community Disaster" and "Behavioural Problems in the Adaptation of White Man to the Arctic". Finally, he received funding through the Department of National Health and Welfare ("H&W").

Between 1950 and 1964, 10 projects on which Dr. Cameron is named as principal investigator received grants (totaling $495,444.41) from the Department of National Health and Welfare. Out of these 10 projects, 6 of them appear to have been submitted under Cameron's name as department head, but did not involve his participation.

The following are a list of the 4 programs (the first 2 not directly related to the subject of this article) funded by the Department of National Health and Welfare on which Dr. Cameron was principal investigator:

- "A Study of the Effects of Nucleic Acid Upon Memory Impairment in the Aged"
- "The Influence of Psychotropic Drugs upon Cerebral Responses to Peripheral Stimulation in Man" (finished by a Dr. Davis after Cameron's retirement)
- "Support for a Behavioural Laboratory" (funded for $17,875.00) which included experiments to:
  - test memory and learning impairment due to individual and cumulative electric shock
  - film patients against a checkered backdrop before and after ECT treatment, to see if any differences in physical movements could be detected
  - study the effects of sensory isolation
  - investigate psychic driving techniques in various situations: while the patient was under hypnosis, in continuous sleep, and when the patient's resistance was lowered using the isolation techniques of Dr. Hebb.
- "Study of Factors which Promote or Retard Personality Change in Individuals Exposed to Prolonged Repetition of Verbal Signals" (i.e. psychic driving) (funded for $51,860.00)

=== The CIA ===
Total funding provided to Dr. Cameron from 1957 to 1962 by the CIA amounted to approximately $84,820. The CIA's files on MKUltra, the program through which these grants were delivered, were destroyed in 1973 and so the specific details of the grants are not known. It is, however, understood that they covered research into the uses of psychic driving, depatterning, sleep therapy, sensory isolation, and drugs on subjects.

In her 2008 book, The Shock Doctrine, author Naomi Klein alleges that many of the findings from the Montreal experiments were incorporated by the CIA into the KUBARK Counterintelligence Interrogation manual, one of the seven manuals which were declassified by the Pentagon in 1996, often referred to as the "torture manuals".

=== Investigation ===
In 1985, responding to a lawsuit on the matter, the Minister of Justice of Canada, John Crosbie, requested a report be written on the experiments of Dr. Cameron, with particular attention to be paid to funding and the Canadian Government's potential liability in the case. The matter was investigated by attorney and former MP for Halifax, George Cooper, who found that allegations made out in the lawsuit relating to the use of depatterning, psychic driving and sensory isolation in Dr. Cameron's experiments were factual and that the use of depatterning and psychic driving in medicine were not based on sound principles. His final conclusion on the matter, however, was that the Department of National Health and Welfare had not acted irresponsibly in funding the experiments, stating:

"In conclusion, it is my opinion that in relation to the structure and operation of its granting procedures, the Department of National Health and Welfare conducted itself at all times in a prudent and professional manner. The practice of careful internal review of all applications, followed by a referral of the applications to two experts in the particular field from outside the Department for detailed and anonymous scrutiny and comment, followed in turn by a review by the panel of qualified outside experts forming the Mental Health Advisory Committee and its Research Sub-Committee, in my opinion demonstrates the good faith and competence of the public servants responsible."

The Cooper report was criticized by the lawyer who represented the Montreal Experiment victims against the CIA for lacking independence from the government and for not interviewing any of the victims or their families.

== Treatment ==
With the goal of inducing lifelong changes in humans, Cameron used different methods of depatterning and repatterning the brain. The procedures included psychic driving, drug-induced sleep, intensive electroconvulsive therapy, sensory deprivation and the administration of neuroleptic Thorazine.

=== Drug-induced sleep ===
Cameron used doses of thorazine to put patients into an artificial coma.

The drug-induced sleep, which took place in the "sleep room", usually lasted from a few days up to 86 days; longer than expected by the patients. Cameron often combined the sleep periods with injections of hallucinogenic drugs (e.g. LSD), as well as administration of electroshocks and the playing of pre-recorded messages into patients' ears.

=== Electroconvulsive therapy (ECT) ===
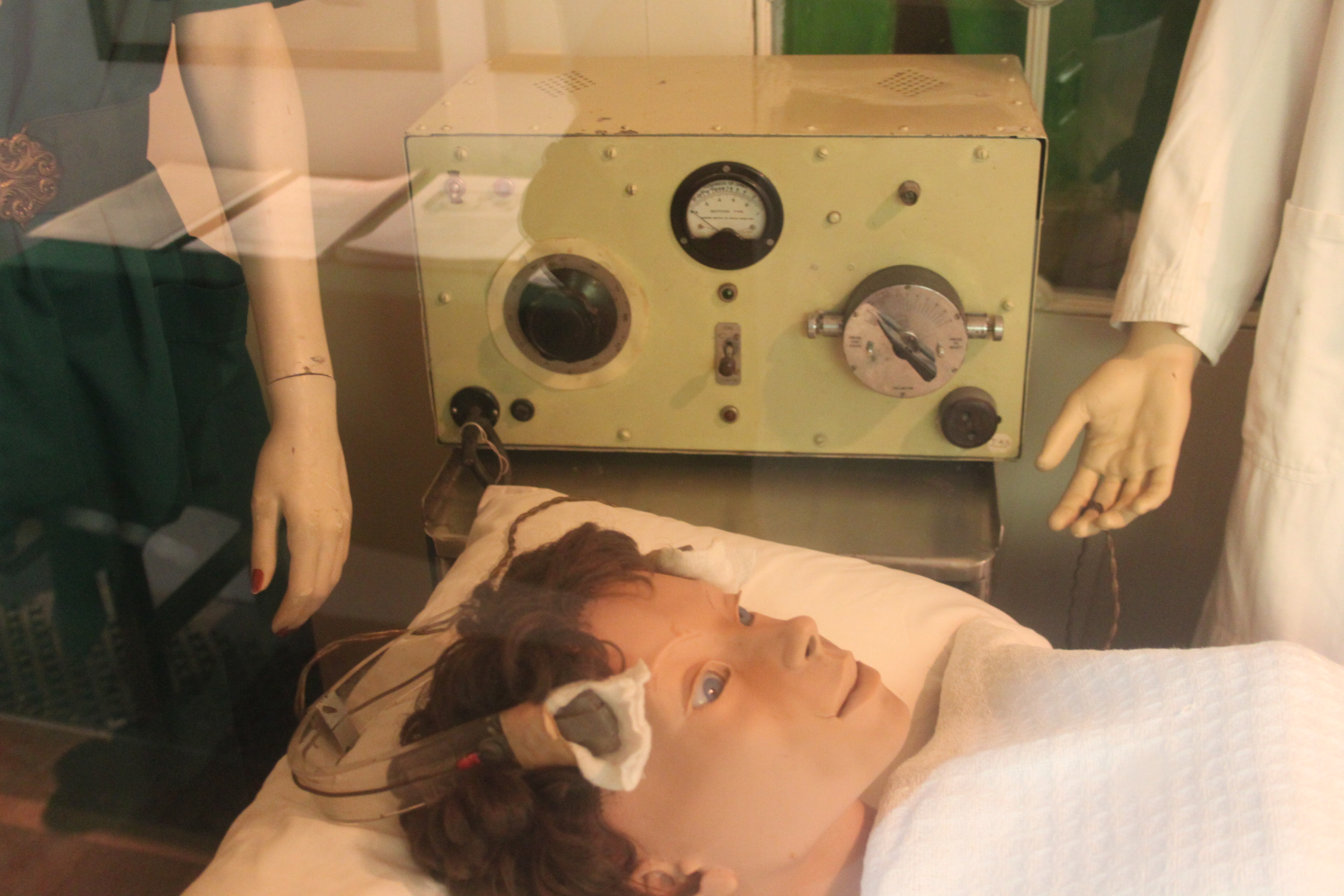
Electroconvulsive Therapy

Electroconvulsive therapy (also called electroshock therapy) is a procedure used to treat psychological disorders like treatment-resistant depression.

Another way of depatterning the brain was intensive electroconvulsive therapy (electroshock therapy). Usually, 2 to 3 daily sessions were ordered, consisting of six 150-Volt shocks that lasted one second. After 30-40 daily sessions, Cameron progressively reduced the sessions and finished the treatment after a two-year follow up program with one session per month.

=== Sensory deprivation ===
Inspired by Donald Hebb's experiment on sensory deprivation and human cognition, Cameron included these techniques in his treatment program. Patients were deprived of their senses by covering ears, eyes and/or skin. Furthermore, patients were given little food, water and oxygen, and instead injected with drugs (LSD, curare) to keep them in a paralyzed state.

=== Psychic driving ===
In order to repattern the brain, patients had to listen to specific recordings of Cameron repeatedly. This process took place for up to 16 hours a day, and over the whole period messages could be repeated up to half a million times altogether. For the first ten days, recordings contained personal, negative messages, which were followed by ten days of positive messages.

Anxiety that would emerge in patients was countered with heavy doses of sedating drugs such as Sodium Amytal and Largactil.

== Subjects ==
It is unknown how many people were subjected to the Montreal Experiments exactly, but over 300 people applied for compensation in 1992 with the Canadian Government. The subjects of the experiment mainly had mental health issues like depression and schizophrenia, and were hoping to get treated for these illnesses by Cameron. None of them had given informed consent to the procedures, or were aware of the experiments being conducted. This was a gross violation of the Nuremberg Code, a code of ethics set up after World War II. Children and adults from many social backgrounds were experimented on, most of them for up to three years.

Victims often suffered from retrograde amnesia for the rest of their lives and had to relearn most skills they had. Many were in a childlike state and even had to be toilet-trained. Family described them as even more emotionally unstable as before and some of them were unable to live a normal life afterwards. One such victim was Jean Steel, whose daughter said that she never returned to be the same woman ever again. Jean would sit alone in the dark, write codes on the walls, and according to her daughter, "her emotions were stripped. It took away her soul."

== Aftermath ==
Project MKUltra officially ended in 1973, around the time that the Watergate scandal broke.

It was not until 1975 that the general public was informed about the extent of CIA meddling, largely due to the involvement of the Church Committee, which was tasked with the investigation of "the extent, if any, to which illegal, improper, or unethical activities were engaged in by any agency of the Federal Government,"

During the 1977 Senate Hearing on MKUltra, Senator Ted Kennedy called for the release of all documents pertaining to MKUltra, saying "the best way to put this period behind us, obviously, is to have the full information…" The Senate Hearing also allowed the CIA Director of the time, Stansfield Turner, to give his prepared statement and to elaborate on the discovery of seven boxes of information related to Project MKUltra, most of which turned out to consist of "approvals for advance of funds, vouchers, accountings, and the like - most of which are not very informative as to the nature of the activities that were undertaken." This made it very difficult to judge the extent of CIA involvement with the Montreal Experiments.

More information was revealed in the Canadian CBC documentary series "The Fifth Estate". In March 1980, they released a first episode about Project MKUltra, which not only held the testimony of two Canadian patients who'd undergone the treatment speaking out for the first time, but also the revelation that Ottawa had aided to suppress information that CIA officials had apologised to the Canadian government following the initial revelation of the experimentation. The second episode, released in 2017, focuses on the present-day struggle of the victims to receive compensation, the hindrances made to prevent them from speaking out about their experiences, and the efforts of the CIA and Canadian government to keep their involvement hidden. Mentioned in particular are a 1988 class action settlement made by the victims against the CIA, which they won, receiving 67,000 US dollars each, and a 1992 compensation from the Canadian government, in which 77 individuals received 100,000 US dollars each, but signed away their right to sue the government or the hospital. This compensation did not extend to 250 other victims, denied for not being "tortured enough, applied too late or because they couldn't produce medical records."

Neither the Canadian government nor the CIA have issued formal apologies for their involvement and funding of Project MKUltra or the Montreal experiments. A 1986 report found that government officials were not fully aware of Cameron's experiments. In 2017, the Canadian government reached an out-of-court settlement with the daughter of one of the patients, paying 100,000 US dollars in exchange for dropping the legal case, and signing a non-disclosure agreement which would prevent her from talking about the settlement.

== Criticism ==
There is no clear evidence of what really happened in the Montreal Experiments. None of Cameron's personal files concerning his experiments survived. Other documents which would verify the Montreal Experiments either no longer exist or are still classified. Most of the information on the experiments is rooted in reports of victims, especially their journals or court reports.
