= The Adjuster =

1991 Canadian drama film by Atom Egoyan

- Film poster
- Directed by: Atom Egoyan
- Written by: Atom Egoyan
- Produced by: Robert Lantos
- Starring: Elias Koteas; Arsinée Khanjian; Maury Chaykin; Gabrielle Rose; David Hemblen; Jennifer Dale
- Cinematography: Paul Sarossy
- Edited by: Susan Shipton
- Music by: Mychael Danna
- Production companies: Ego Film Arts; Alliance Entertainment
- Distributed by: Orion Classics (US)
- Release dates: September 26, 1991 (Canada); July 1992 (US)
- Running time: 102 minutes
- Country: Canada
- Language: English
- Budget: C$1,500,000 (estimated)
- Box office: C$396,573

The Adjuster is a 1991 Canadian drama film directed by Atom Egoyan, his fourth feature film and the first to achieve international acclaim. The film won five awards, as well as two other nominations upon its initial release.

== Plot ==
Insurance adjuster Noah Render lives with his film-censor wife Hera in a barren, unfinished suburban development. He spends his time rescuing clients of his company whose homes have burned down. His methods are unorthodox. He puts them all up in the same motel, visits them frequently, sleeps with some of them (men as well as women) and forever quotes his mantra: "You may not know it yet, but you're in shock." His wife also subverts her responsibilities, bringing home steamy film clips to share with her reclusive sister.

A parallel plot involves a wealthy and bored couple, Bubba and Mimi, who seek sexual adventure. On the pretext of shooting a film, probably pornographic, they rent Noah's isolated house and he moves his family to join his clients in the motel. Returning late one night, he finds his family gone and assumes that they have returned home. Rushing there, he finds his house is burning down.

== Cast ==
- Elias Koteas as Noah Render
- Arsinée Khanjian as Hera
- Maury Chaykin as Bubba
- Gabrielle Rose as Mimi
- Jennifer Dale as Arianne
- David Hemblen as Bert, The Head Censor
- Rose Sarkisyan as Seta, Hera's Sister
- Armen Kokorian as Simon, Hera's Child
- Jacqueline Samuda as Louise, The Maid
- Gerard Parkes as Tim
- Patricia Collins as Lorraine
- Don McKellar as Tyler, The Young Censor
- John Gilbert as The Doctor
- Stephen Ouimette as Larry, The Butterfly Collector
- Raoul Trujillo as Matthew, His Lover

== Reception ==
Wyndham Wise wrote, "His effective use of wide-screen cinematography portrays the terrifying abyss that separates Noah from everyone he encounters." Egoyan based the film on a true story in 1989, when a fire burned down his parents' home. He realized how strange it could be for victims of a house fire to be emotionally dependent on insurance workers, which led to the inspiration for the project.

Egoyan promoted a book named after his film, The Adjuster, at a launch in Ottawa. It is a film analysis written by Tom McSorley, a head of the Canadian Film Institute. This book is part of an examination of Canadian cinema, in a series for the University of Toronto Press. The author goes into intricate depth about The Adjuster as he traces the genesis, production, and reception of the film. McSorley claims that it is a watershed film.

The film premiered at the New York Film Festival and was invited to the Director's Fortnight program at the Cannes Film Festival. The film opened with generally favourable reviews. On review aggregator Rotten Tomatoes, the film holds a score of 73% based on 15 reviews, with an average rating of 6.7/10. Both Roger Ebert and The New York Times' Janet Maslin gave positive reviews for the film's initial release. It was selected as one of The New York Times' Best 1000 Movies Ever Made.

=== Accolades ===
The film garnered several accolades. At the 17th Moscow International Film Festival it won the Special Silver St. George. It also won the Best Canadian Feature Film award at the 1991 Toronto International Film Festival; Egoyan accepted the award and trophy, but declined the $25,000 cheque that came with it, and instead donated the money to John Pozer, who had been the runner-up with his film The Grocer's Wife. TIFF later ranked the film tenth place in its 1990s run of the Top 10 Canadian Films of All Time. (In the updated 2004 version it was replaced by another Egoyan film, The Sweet Hereafter, released in 1997, in the fourth place.)

The Adjuster was awarded Best Canadian Film and Best Ontario Feature at the Sudbury Cinéfest, the Special Jury Prize at the Moscow International Film Festival, and the Golden Spike at the Valladolid International Film Festival; all taken place in same year of its release in 1991.

Award	Category	Result
17th Moscow International Film Festival	Special Silver St. George	Won
1991 Toronto International Film Festival	Best Canadian Feature Film	Won
Sudbury Cinéfest	Best Canadian Film	Won
Sudbury Cinéfest	Best Ontario Feature	Won
Moscow International Film Festival	Special Jury Prize	Won
Valladolid International Film Festival	Special Jury Prize	Won
