= 1991 Toronto International Film Festival =

Annual Canadian film festival

- Festival poster
- Location: Toronto, Ontario, Canada
- Hosted by: Toronto International Film Festival Group
- Festival date: September 5, 1991–September 14, 1991
- Language: English
- Website: tiff.net
- 1992 1990

The 16th Toronto International Film Festival (TIFF) took place in Toronto, Ontario, Canada between September 5 and September 14, 1991. Jodie Foster's directorial debut film Little Man Tate, premiered in the Gala Presentation at the festival.

== Awards ==
Award	Film	Director
People's Choice Award	The Fisher King	Terry Gilliam
Best Canadian Feature Film	The Adjuster	Atom Egoyan
Best Canadian Feature Film - Special Jury Citation	The Grocer's Wife	John Pozer
Best Canadian Short Film	The Making of Monsters	John Greyson
International Critics' Award	My Own Private Idaho	Gus Van Sant

== Programme ==
=== Gala Presentation ===
- The Fisher King by Terry Gilliam
- Life on a String by Chen Kaige
- Days of Being Wild by Wong Kar-wai
- My Own Private Idaho by Gus Van Sant
- Barton Fink by Joel Coen and Ethan Coen
- Singapore Sling by Nikos Nikolaidis
- Raise the Red Lantern by Zhang Yimou
- Little Man Tate by Jodie Foster
- Daughters of the Dust by Julie Dash
- My Father Is Coming by Monika Treut
- Delicatessen by Jean-Pierre Jeunet and Marc Caro
- The Indian Runner by Sean Penn
- The Double Life of Veronique by Krzysztof Kieślowski
- Hear My Song by Peter Chelsom
- Prospero's Books by Peter Greenaway
- The Hours and Times by Christopher Münch
- Black Robe by Bruce Beresford
- Lovers by Vicente Aranda
- Toto the Hero by Jaco Van Dormael
- La stazione by Sergio Rubini
- Homework by Jaime Humberto Hermosillo
- Edward II by Derek Jarman
- A Woman's Tale by Paul Cox
- Cold Heaven by Nicolas Roeg
- Paradise by Mary Agnes Donoghue

=== Canadian Perspective ===
- The Adjuster by Atom Egoyan
- Clearcut by Ryszard Bugajski
- Connecting Lines by Mary Daniel
- Deadly Currents by Simcha Jacobovici
- Devil in America (Le Diable d'Amérique) by Gilles Carle
- Diplomatic Immunity by Sturla Gunnarsson
- The Events Leading Up to My Death by Bill Robertson
- The Fabulous Voyage of the Angel (Le Fabuleux voyage de l'ange) by Jean Pierre Lefebvre
- The Falls by Kevin McMahon
- Flesh Angels by Bruce Elder
- The Grocer's Wife by John Pozer
- Highway 61 by Bruce McDonald
- The Making of Monsters by John Greyson
- Masala by Srinivas Krishna
- New Shoes by Ann Marie Fleming
- The Quarrel by Eli Cohen
- RSVP by Laurie Lynd
- Sam & Me by Deepa Mehta
- South of Wawa by Robert Boyd
- Talk 16 by Janis Lundman and Adrienne Mitchell
- True Confections by Gail Singer
- Understanding Bliss by William D. MacGillivray
- A Vision in the Darkness (Des lumières dans la grande noirceur) by Sophie Bissonnette
- When the Fire Burns: The Life and Music of Manuel De Falla by Larry Weinstein
- Wisecracks by Gail Singer

=== Midnight Madness ===
- Children of the Night by Tony Randel
- The Devil's Daughter by Michele Soavi
- The Borrower by John McNaughton
- The Arrival by David Schmoeller
- Motorama by Barry Shils
- Guilty as Charged by Sam Irvin
- The Raid by Tsui Hark
- Blood & Concrete by Jeffrey Reiner
- A Chinese Ghost Story III by Ching Siu-tung

=== Documentaries ===
- Face Value by Johan van der Keuken
