= Saeed Jaffrey filmography =

Saeed Jaffrey OBE (1929 – 2015) was a British-Indian actor who worked in numerous British and Indian movies. His film credits include The Man Who Would Be King (1975), Shatranj Ke Khiladi (The Chess Players) (1977), Gandhi (1982). His brief filmography is given below.

== Filmography ==
Year	Title	Role	Notes
1958	Stalked	The Pitch-Man	
1969	The Guru	Murad	
1971	The Horsemen	District Chief	
1972	Tanhai		
1974	fr:Le soleil se lève à l'est	Maharaja Ranjit Singh	
1975	The Wilby Conspiracy	Dr. Anil Mukarjee, Indian Dentist	
1975	The Man Who Would Be King	Billy Fish	
1977	Shatranj Ke Khilari (The Chess Players)	Mir Roshan Ali	
1978	Death on the Nile	Servant on the Karnak	
1980	Ek Baar Phir	Saeed	
1981	Sphinx	Selim	
1981	Chashme Buddoor	Lalan Mian	
1982	Star	Rana	
1982	Gandhi	Sardar Vallabhbhai Patel	
1982	Aagaman	Mill owner's agent	
1983	Romance	Journalist / Editor	
1983	Masoom	Suri	
1983	Mandi	Major / Councillor Agarwal	
1983	Kissi Se Na Kehna	Lalaji	
1983	Ek Din Bahu Ka	Army Colonel	
1983	The Courtesans of Bombay		
1984	Asambhava		
1984	The Far Pavilions	Biju Ram	
1984	Mashaal	Kishori Lal	
1984	The Jewel in the Crown	The Nawab of Mirat	
1984	Bhavna		
1984	The Razor's Edge	Raaz	
1984	A Passage to India	Advocate Hamidullah	
1985	Karishma Kudrat Ka	Lala Dayaluram	
1985	Cricketer		
1985	Ram Teri Ganga Maili	Kunj Bihari	
1985	Saagar	Mr. D'Silva	
1985	My Beautiful Laundrette	Nasser Ali	
1985	Jaanoo	Shastri	
1985	Phir Aayee Barsaat	Rajhan - Anuradha's father	
1986	Qatl	Judge	
1986	Kala Dhanda Goray Log	Pinto Ustad	
1986	On Wings of Fire	Jadav Rana, the Hindu king	
1987	Jalwa	Yakub Saeed	
1987	Partition		
1987	Awaam	Defense Advocate	
1987	Khudgarz	Brij Bhushan Saxena	
1987	Beyond the Next Mountain	Prime Minister Prasad	
1987	Aulad	Anand's chacha	
1988	Kab Tak Chup Rahungi		
1988	Vijay	Inder Sen Gujral	
1988	Just Ask for Diamond	Mr. Patel	
1988	The Deceivers	Hussein	
1988	Hero Hiralal	Aziz Bhai	
1988	Khoon Bhari Maang	Mr. Saxena	
1988	Pyasi Atma		
1988	Ek Aadmi		
1989	Eeshwar	Masterji	
1989	Manika, une vie plus tard	Père Provincial	
1989	Daata	Master Dinanath	
1989	Aakhri Ghulam	Fakeer	
1989	Hisaab Khoon Ka	Diwanji	
1989	Chaalbaaz	Vishwannath	
1989	Ram Lakhan	Police Commissioner Arun Kashyap	
1990	Yadoon Ka Mausam		
1990	Naya Khoon	Veerendra Pratap Rai	
1990	Aandhiyan	Shakuntala's father	
1990	Dil	Mr. Mehra	
1990	Shandaar		
1990	Pathar Ke Insan	Balwant Rai	
1990	Kishen Kanhaiya	Vidhya Charan	
1990	Ghar Ho To Aisa	Ramprasad Kumar	
1990	After Midnight	Jas	
1991	Yaara Dildara		
1991	Gunehgar Kaun	Rai Bahadur Diwan	
1991	Ajooba	Magician Ameer Baba	
1991	Afsana Pyar Ka	Anand Verma	
1991	Henna	Khan Baba	
1991	Indrajeet	Seth Din Dayal	
1991	Masala	Lallu Bhai Solanki / Mr. Tikkoo / Lord Krishna	
1992	Jai Kaali	Bankelal Chaurasia	
1992	Vansh	Police Commissioner	
1992	Suryavanshi	J.B.	
1992	Nishchay	Suryakant Gujral	
1992	Laat Saab	Ajay Kumar 'Raja Saab' Rai	
1993	Anmol	S.J	
1993	15th August	Superintendent of Police, Pratapsingh Solanki	
1993	Ek Hi Raasta	Colonel Choudhry	
1993	Aulad Ke Dushman	Bade Pa	
1993	Balmaa		
1993	Aashik Awara	Kedarnath	
1993	Aaina	Mr. Gupta	
1993	Reyasat	Thakur Dhirendra Pratap	
1994	Dilwale	Police Commissioner	
1994	Baali Umar Ko Salaam	Jaalan 'Jaalu'	
1994	Salaami	Mr. Oberoi	
1994	Yeh Dillagi	Bhanupratap Saigal	
1994	Bollywood		
1994	Deewana Sanam		
1995	Sauda	Prakash's uncle	
1995	Jai Vikraanta	Police Commissioner	
1995	Param Vir Chakra	Naval Officer	
1995	Prem	R.K. Jetley	
1995	Saajan Ki Baahon Mein	Ranjit Singh	
1995	Guddu	Qawwali Singer	
1995	Veergati	Pooja's dad	
1995	Angrakshak	Sanghvi	
1995	Gambler	SP Kulkarni	
1995	Vartmaan		
1995	Trimurti	Bhanu	
1995	Kartavya	Ramakant Sahay	
1995	Ravanraaj		
1995	Reshma		
1996	English Babu Desi Mem	Lawyer Madadgar	
1996	Bambai Ka Babu	Vicky's father	
1996	Megha	Jai kishan	Uncredited
1996	Lulu		
1996	Raja Ki Aayegi Baraat	Rai Bahadur	
1996	Jaan	Roshanlal	
1996	Bandit Lovers		
1997	Judaai	Mr. Sinha	
1997	Mahaanta	Police Commissioner	
1997	Ek Phool Teen Kante		
1997	Deewana Mastana	Nandkishore Sharma	
1997	The Journey	Ashok	
1997	Udaan	Mr. Sahay	
1997	Uff! Yeh Mohabbat	Viren Verma	
1997	Naseeb	Dharamdas Bajaj	
1997	Mohabbat	Madanlal Kapoor	
1997	Dil Deewana Maane Na		
1998	Aunty No. 1	Colonel Sadanand Dhongre	
1998	Jab Pyaar Kisise Hota Hai	Komal's father	
1998	Angaar Vadee		
1998	Achanak	Yashpal Nanda	
1998	Guru in Seven		
1998	Dildaara	Karan Singh	
1998	Kashmir Angarvadi		
1999	Amruta		
2000	Being Considered	Raj	
2000	Second Generation	Saeed	
2001	On Wings of Fire	Jadav Rana, the Hindu king	
2001	Albela	Ambassador Heinz	
2001	Mr In-Between	Mr. Basmati	
2002	Snapshots	Ibrahim	
2002	Mad Dogs	Prophet	
2002	Pyar Ki Dhun	Mr. Shah	
2002	Day of the Sirens	Albert Page	
2003	Cross My Heart	Subhash	
2004	Kaun Hai Jo Sapno Mein Aaya		
2005	Chicken Tikka Masala	C. P. Chopra	
2005	Zoltan the Great	Zoltan	
2006	Bhavishya, The Future	Himself	
2008	Bunker Hill	Mr. Farook	
2009	Sanam Teri Kasam	Vikram Verma	
2011	Everywhere and Nowhere	Zaf's Dad	(final film role)
