= The Living Dead (TV series) =

1995 British TV documentary series

- Written by: Adam Curtis
- Country of origin: United Kingdom
- Original language: English
- No. of series: 1
- No. of episodes: 3

Production
- Executive producer: Edward Mirzoeff
- Producers: Adam Curtis; Susan Gautier-Smith; Annabel Hobley
- Cinematography: Michael Eley
- Running time: 177 minutes (three parts)
- Production company: BBC

Original release
- Network: BBC Two
- Release: 30 May – 13 June 1995

Related
- Pandora's Box (1992); The Mayfair Set (1999)

The Living Dead: Three Films About the Power of the Past is a BBC television documentary series, the second by British filmmaker Adam Curtis, originally broadcast on BBC Two in 1995. In the series, Curtis examines the different ways that history and memory (both national and individual) have been used and manipulated by politicians and others.

== Summary of episodes ==
=== Part 1. "On the Desperate Edge of Now" ===
This episode, broadcast on 30 May 1995, examines how the various national ideals and memories of the Second World War were effectively buried, rewritten and manipulated in the Cold War era, only to violently resurface later with events such as the protests of 1968, the emergence of the Red Army Faction, and the turmoil of the Yugoslav Wars.

For Germany, this process began at the Nuremberg Trials, where the use of the film The Nazi Plan was intended to reveal the criminality of the Nazi state, and attempts were made to prevent defendants—principally Hermann Göring—from providing any rational or contextualized argument for their actions during the war. Subsequently, however, bringing lower-ranking Nazis to justice was all but forgotten in the interests of maintaining West Germany as an important new ally in the Cold War. For the Allies, faced with a new enemy in the Soviet Union, there was a need to portray World War II as a crusade of pure good against pure evil, even if this meant creating a mismatch by denying the memories of the individual soldiers who had actually done the fighting and knew it to have been far more ambiguous.

The title of this episode comes from a veteran's description of the uncertainty of survival in combat. A number of American veterans related how, years later, they found themselves plagued with previously suppressed memories of the brutal things they had seen and done.

==== Contributors ====
- Louis Simpson, Private in US Airborne Division 1943–45
- Paul Fussell, infantryman in US Army 1944–45
- Frau Witta and Frau Torman, housekeepers at Carinhall
- Utz Ulrich, Curator, Nuremberg museum
- Carlo Jahn, Gatekeeper of Congress Hall, Nuremberg
- Herr Fruehwirt, member of the Hitler Youth 1933–41
- Peter Uiberall, Goering's interpreter at Nuremberg trials
- Burton C. Andrus Jnr, son of Burton C. Andrus, Commandant of the Nuremberg Prison
- Robert Wolfe, Head of Captured German Documents, US National Archives
- Mary Burns, stenographer at Nuremberg trials
- Horst Mahler, a leader of Red Army Faction
- George Garand, interrogator at Nuremberg trials
- Anna Cameron, stenographer at Nuremberg trials
- Drexel Sprecher, US lawyer at Nuremberg trials
- Dr John Lattimer, urologist for defendants at Nuremberg trials
- Peter Block, Keeper of the Statues, Bellevue Palace
- Andre Dufresne, infantryman in US Army 1943–45
- Kitta Wagner, Nuremberg resident
- Egon Hanfstaengel, son of Ernst Hanfstaengl, Hitler's confidant
- Herman Gremlitza, student movement, 1968
- Christiane Ensslin, sister of Gudrun Ensslin, a founder of Red Army Faction
- Alfred Kernd'l, Chief Archaeologist to the City of Berlin

=== Part 2. "You Have Used Me as a Fish Long Enough" ===
In this episode, broadcast on 6 June 1995, the early history of the Central Intelligence Agency's (CIA) use of brainwashing and mind control is examined. Its thesis is that a search for control over the past, via medical intervention, had to be abandoned, and that in modern times, control over the past is more effectively exercised by the manipulation of history. It concludes that despite successful attempts to remove memories of the past, doing so often left an emotional void that was hard to refill.

The angle pursued by Curtis is the way in which psychiatry historically pursued tabula rasa theories of the mind, initially to set people free from traumatic memories and then later as a potential instrument of societal control. The work of Ewen Cameron is surveyed, with particular reference to the early medical use of electroconvulsive therapy, Cold War theories of communist brainwashing, and the search for hypnoprogammed sleeper agents and assassins. After the intelligence agency failures over the Kennedy assassination and the failed assassination attempts against Fidel Castro, this work was later abandoned in favour of computerised memory and intelligence research, such as the Defense Advanced Research Projects Agency (DARPA), created in 1958.

The title of this episode comes from a paranoid schizophrenic seen in archive film in the programme, who believed that her neighbours were using her as a source of amusement by denying her any privacy—like a goldfish in a bowl. Some footage from this episode, an interview with one of Cameron's victims, was later reused by Curtis in The Century of the Self.

==== Contributors ====
- Joy Shannon, Administrator, Montreal Neurological Institute
- Dr Herb Jasper, assistant to Wilder Penfield
- Dr Heinz Lehmann, psychiatrist and colleague of Dr Cameron
- Dr Peter Roper, psychiatrist at Allan Memorial Institute
- Thomas Polgar, CIA Assistant Chief of Station in Berlin 1949–55
- Dr John Gittinger, CIA Chief Psychologist 1950–74
- Milton Kline, psychologist and adviser to CIA
- Laughlin Taylor, assistant to Dr Cameron 1958–60
- Linda MacDonald, former patient of Dr Cameron
- Jerome Bruner, cognitive psychologist, 1950s
- John Marks, former assistant to CIA Director of Intelligence and Research
- Victor Marchetti, CIA officer 1955–69
- Gray Lynch, CIA officer, 1960s
- William Alexander, Assistant District Attorney, Dallas 1963
- Yuri Nosenko, KGB defector
- Colonel Yuri Modin, KGB officer 1947–80
- Ulric Neisser, cognitive psychologist, 1960s
- Robert Cooper, Director of ARPA 1981–85
- Marvin Minsky, artificial intelligence scientist, MIT
- Gary Chapman, historian of artificial intelligence
- Robert Simpson, Projects Officer at ARPA 1985–90
- Marco Lloyd, platoon commander in the Gulf War

=== Part 3. "The Attic" ===
In this episode, broadcast on 13 June 1995, the national aspirations of Margaret Thatcher are examined, particularly the way in which she used public sentiment in an attempt to capture the national spirit embodied in the famous speeches and writings of the wartime prime minister, Winston Churchill. Curtis argues that by harking back, or summoning the spirit of Britain's "glorious past", to fulfil short-term political or national ends, the process backfired in the long-run, trapping the invoker in the societal maladies of the present day.

The example provided is the wartime levels of patriotism invoked in the Falklands War crisis, in which Thatcher's rugged determination matched national sentiment, only to dissipate a few years later with events such as the poll tax riots, which contributed to her resignation.

The title is a reference to the attic flat at the top of 10 Downing Street created during Thatcher's refurbishment of the house which did away with the prime minister's old living quarters on the lower floors, replacing them with 18th-century boardrooms. Scenes from Thatcher's premiership are intercut with scenes from the psychological horror film The Innocents (1961), a film adaptation of Henry James's novella The Turn of the Screw.

==== Contributors ====
- Colonel Peter Storey-Pugh, prisoner in Colditz 1940–45
- Sir Stephen Hastings M.C., Conservative MP 1960–63
- Sir Carol Mather M.C., Conservative MP 1970–87
- Colonel Robert Butler
- Airey Neave MP (speaking in 1978)
- Sir Ronald Millar, speech-writer for Mrs Thatcher 1975–90
- Patrick Cosgrave, adviser to Mrs Thatcher 1975–79
- Sir Tim Bell, M.D. Saatchi & Saatchi 1970-85
- Rt Hon. Tony Benn MP
- Sir Robert Rhodes-James, Conservative MP 1976–92
- Rt Hon. Alan Clark, Conservative MP 1974–92
- Terry Robson, Irish Republican Socialist Party Central Committee 1974–84
- PC Claude Morrel, House of Commons Constabulary
- Ruairí Ó Brádaigh, President of Sinn Féin 1970–83
- Mary Reid, member of Irish Republican Socialist Party 1977–79
- Margaret Rule, Archaeological Director, the Mary Rose Project 1982
- Howard Giles, Special Events Coordinator, English Heritage
- Bob Ogley, Editor, Sevenoaks Chronicle
- Peter Spencer, Chief Economist, Kleinwort Benson 1987
- Lord Boothby, Conservative MP 1924–58 (archive)
