= Elizabeth Nickson =

Canadian writer & journalist

Elizabeth Nickson is a Canadian writer and journalist. In the late 1980s and early 1990s, she was European bureau chief of Life magazine.

In 1994, Bloomsbury UK, Knopf Canada and Steidl published her novel The Monkey Puzzle Tree, an account of the CIA brainwashing trials in Montreal in the 1950s and 1960s.

In 2012, HarperCollins US published Nickson's Eco-fascists, How Radical Conservationists Are Destroying Our Natural Heritage, under editor Adam Bellow's imprint Broadside Books.

In 2016, Nickson wrote a series of papers for a Canadian think tank, the Frontier Centre for Public Policy, detailing the policy implication of environmental land use in Canada.

Nickson has also written for Harpers Magazine, The Sunday Times Magazine, and The Guardian, and was a weekly columnist for the Globe and Mail and the National Post from 1999 to 2004.

== Works ==
- The Monkey Puzzle Tree, Bloomsbury UK, Knopf Canada (1994) ISBN 0-7475-2038-0
- Eco-Fascists: How Radical Conservationists Are Destroying Our Natural Heritage, Broadside (2012) ISBN 0-06-208003-2
