= Simon Callow =

British actor (born 1949)

Simon Callow CBE
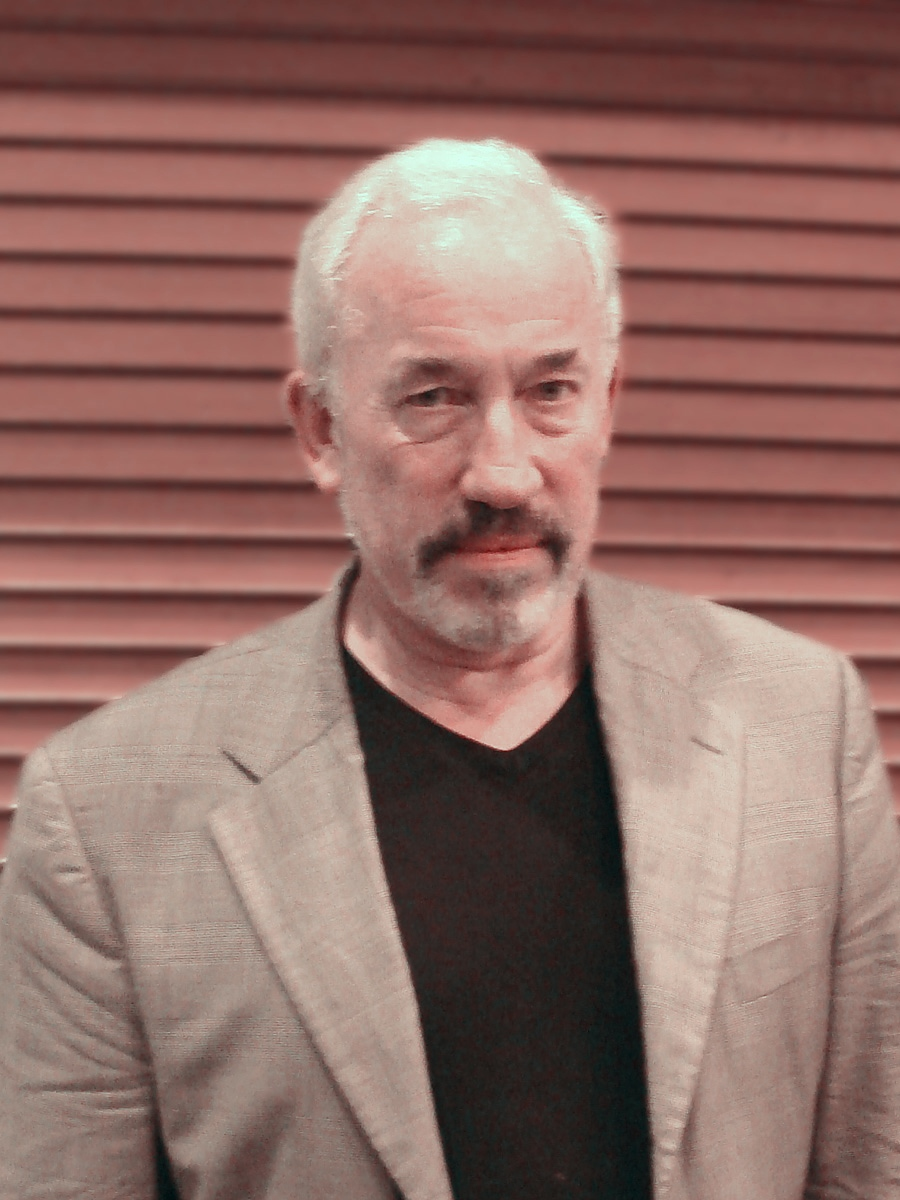
- Callow in 2009
- Born: Simon Phillip Hugh Callow; 15 June 1949 (age 77); Streatham, London, England
- Occupations: Actor; director; author; musician; singer
- Years active: 1973–present
- Spouse: Sebastian Fox (m. 2016)

Simon Phillip Hugh Callow CBE (born 15 June 1949) is an English actor. Known as a character actor on stage and screen, he has received numerous accolades including an Olivier Award and Screen Actors Guild Award as well as nominations for two BAFTA Awards. He was made a Commander of the Order of the British Empire (CBE) for his services to acting by Queen Elizabeth II in 1999.

Callow rose to prominence originating the title role of Wolfgang Amadeus Mozart in the 1979 Peter Shaffer play Amadeus, for which he received a Laurence Olivier Award for Best Actor in a Supporting Role nomination. Callow joined the Miloš Forman 1984 film adaptation, this time portraying Emanuel Schikaneder. In 1992, Callow won the Laurence Olivier Award for Best Director of a Musical for Carmen Jones. As an actor, he won acclaim for his comedic roles in A Room with a View (1985) and Four Weddings and a Funeral (1994) earning a BAFTA Award for Best Actor in a Supporting Role nomination for each. Other notable roles include in Maurice (1987), Howards End (1992), Shakespeare in Love (1998), and The Phantom of the Opera (2004).

His television roles include Tom Chance in the Channel 4 series Chance in a Million (1984) and The Duke of Sandringham in the series Outlander from 2014 to 2016. He portrayed Napoleon in The Man of Destiny (1981), and Charles Dickens in several television projects. He has also appeared on numerous shows such as Midsomer Murders, Rome, Angels in America, Doctor Who, Galavant, Hawkeye, and The Witcher.

== Early life ==
Callow was born on 15 June 1949 in Streatham, South London, the son of Yvonne Mary (née Guise), a secretary and Neil Francis Callow, a businessman. His father was of French descent and his mother was of Danish and German ancestry. His father left when Simon was 18 months old, and he was brought up by his mother and grandmothers. He and his mother travelled to Northern Rhodesia (now called Zambia) when he was nine to try to reconcile with his father. This did not happen and Callow was sent for three years to boarding school in South Africa. He and his mother returned to Britain when he was twelve. He was raised as a Catholic. Callow was a student at the London Oratory School in West Brompton, and then went on to study briefly at Queen's University Belfast in Northern Ireland, where he was active in the gay liberation movement. He gave up his degree course after a year to take a three-year acting course at the Drama Centre London.

== Career ==
=== Acting ===
Callow's immersion in the theatre began after he wrote a fan letter to Laurence Olivier, the artistic director of the National Theatre, and received a response suggesting he join their box-office staff. While watching actors rehearse, he realised he wanted to act.

Callow made his stage debut in 1973, appearing in The Three Estates at the Assembly Rooms Theatre, Edinburgh. In the early 1970s, he joined the Gay Sweatshop theatre company and performed in Martin Sherman's critically acclaimed Passing By. In 1977, he took various parts in the Joint Stock Theatre Company's production of Epsom Downs and in 1979, he starred in Snoo Wilson's The Soul of the White Ant at the Soho Poly.

Callow appeared as Verlaine in Total Eclipse (1982), Lord Foppington in The Relapse (1983) and the title role in Faust (1988) at the Lyric Hammersmith, where he also directed The Infernal Machine (with Dame Maggie Smith) in 1986. In 1985, he played Molina in Kiss of the Spiderwoman at the Bush Theatre, London. He played Mozart in the premiere of Peter Shaffer's Amadeus at the National Theatre (1979), also appearing in the 1983 BBC original cast radio production. He later wrote of having "discovered Mozart quite early: the operas, the symphonies, the concertos, the wind serenades were all very much part of my musical landscape when I was asked to play the part of the composer in Peter Shaffer's Amadeus; possibly this was one of the reasons I got the job." He appeared at the National Theatre as Orlando in As You Like It (1979) and Fulganzio in Life of Galileo (1980).

Callow appeared with Saeed Jaffrey in the 1994 British television drama series Little Napoleons, playing a scheming Conservative councillor in local government. He voice-acted the sly and traitorous Wolfgang in Shoebox Zoo. In 2004, he appeared on a Comic Relief episode of Little Britain for charity causes. In 2006, he wrote a piece for the BBC One programme This Week bemoaning the lack of characters in modern politics. He has starred as Count Fosco, the villain of Wilkie Collins's novel The Woman in White, in film (1997) and on stage (2005, in the Andrew Lloyd Webber musical in the West End).

Callow starred in the three-part original Gold comedy The Rebel in 2016.

In 2022, he joined the cast of the UK revival of Cole Porter's Anything Goes replacing Gary Wilmot as Elisha Whitney. The production would complete a UK tour before finishing with a run at the Barbican Centre. From 11 July to 3 August 2008, Callow appeared at the Stratford Shakespeare Festival in Canada in There Reigns Love, a performance of the sonnets of William Shakespeare. The same year, he appeared at the Edinburgh Festival, performing "Dr. Marigold" and "Mr. Chops" by Charles Dickens, adapted and directed by Patrick Garland; repeating them from December 2009 to January 2010 at the Riverside Studios and on tour in 2011.

In February 2008, he played the psychiatrist in the Chichester Festival Theatre's production of Peter Shaffer's Equus.

Between March and August 2009, he played Pozzo in Sean Mathias's production of Waiting for Godot by Samuel Beckett with Ian McKellen as Estragon, Patrick Stewart as Vladimir, and Ronald Pickup as Lucky. The production toured Britain before a run at the Theatre Royal, Haymarket, in London

From June to November 2010, he appeared in a national tour of a new one-man play, Shakespeare: the Man from Stratford, written by Jonathan Bate, directed by Tom Cairns, and produced by the Ambassador Theatre Group. The play was renamed Being Shakespeare for its West End debut at the Trafalgar Studios, where it opened on 15 June 2011. It was revived at the same theatre in March 2012, prior to a run in New York City and Chicago. In March 2014, it returned to the West End, this time at the Harold Pinter Theatre.

In October 2014, Callow appeared in a comedy sketch made for Channel 4's The Feeling Nuts Comedy Night to raise awareness of testicular cancer. The same year, he played the recurring role of the fictional Duke of Sandringham in the Starz period TV series, Outlander.

In December 2022, Callow appeared as Dick in the Christmas special of BBC dark comedy Inside No. 9, "The Bones of St Nicholas".

=== Film ===
He made his first film appearance in 1984 as Schikaneder in Amadeus. The following year, he appeared as the Reverend Mr Beebe in A Room with a View. His first television role was in the Carry On Laughing episode "Orgy and Bess" in 1975, but it was cut from the final print. He starred in several series of the Channel 4 situation comedy Chance in a Million, as Tom Chance, an eccentric individual to whom coincidences happened regularly. Roles like this and his part in Four Weddings and a Funeral brought him to a wider audience. Callow portrayed Pliny the Elder in CBBC's 2007 children's drama series Roman Mysteries in the episode "The Secrets of Vesuvius". He played Armand Duquesne in Marvel's Hawkeye on Disney+.

=== Directing ===
Callow also directed plays and wrote: his Being An Actor (1984) was a critique of 'director dominated' theatre, in addition to containing autobiographical sections relating to his early career as an actor. In 1992, he directed the play Shades by Sharman MacDonald and the musical My Fair Lady, featuring costumes designed by Jasper Conran. In 1995, he directed a stage version of the classic French film Les Enfants du Paradis for the Royal Shakespeare Company. As part of the Covent Garden Festival, in May 1996 Callow directed Cantabile in three musical pieces (Commuting – premiere, The Waiter's Revenge, and Ricercare No. 4 – premiere) composed by his friend Stephen Oliver. Ricercare No. 4 had been commissioned from Oliver by Callow on the death of his partner.

Among opera productions directed by Callow are a Così fan tutte in Lucerne, Die Fledermaus for Scottish Opera in 1988, Il tritico for the Broomhill Trust, Kent in August 1995, Menotti's The Consul at Holland Park Opera, London in 1999 and Le roi malgré lui by Chabrier at Grange Park Opera in 2003. He also directed Carmen Jones at the Old Vic, London in 1991, with Wilhelmenia Fernandez in the title role.

One of Callow's best-known books is Love Is Where It Falls, an analysis of his 11-year relationship with Peggy Ramsay (1908–91), a prominent British theatrical agent from the 1960s to the 1980s. He has also written extensively about Charles Dickens, whom he has played several times: in a one-man show, The Mystery of Charles Dickens by Peter Ackroyd; in the films Hans Christian Andersen: My Life as a Fairytale, and Christmas Carol: The Movie; and on television several times including An Audience with Charles Dickens (BBC, 1996) and in "The Unquiet Dead", a 2005 episode of the BBC science-fiction series Doctor Who. He returned to Doctor Who for the 2011 season finale, again taking the role of Dickens.

In December 2004, he hosted the London Gay Men's Chorus Christmas show, Make the Yuletide Gay, at the Barbican Centre in London. He is currently one of the patrons of the Michael Chekhov Studio London. In July 2006, the London Oratory School Schola announced Callow as one of their new patrons. In November 2007, he threatened to resign from the post over controversy surrounding the Terrence Higgins Trust (an AIDS charity of which Callow is also a patron). Other patrons of the Catholic choir are Princess Michael of Kent and the Scottish composer James MacMillan. He reprised his role as Wolfgang in Shoebox Zoo and voice-acted the wild and action-seeking Hunter, as well.

=== Author ===
Callow has written biographies of Oscar Wilde, Charles Laughton, Orson Welles, and Richard Wagner. He has also written an anthology of Shakespeare passages, Shakespeare on Love, and contributed to Cambridge's Actors on Shakespeare series.

A devotee of classical music, he has contributed articles to Gramophone and The New York Review of Books.

=== Narration ===
Callow was the reader of The Twits and The Witches in the Puffin Roald Dahl Audio Books Collection (ISBN 978-0-140-92255-4), and has done audio versions of several abridged P.G. Wodehouse books that feature, among others, the fictional character Jeeves. They include Very Good, Jeeves and Aunts Aren't Gentlemen. Callow is the reader of the audio book edition of William E. Wallace's Michelangelo, God's Architect, published by Princeton University Press. Callow narrated the audiobook of Robert Fagles' 2006 translation of Virgil's The Aeneid. In November 2009, "Mini Stories", a recording by the Caput Ensemble of Haflidi Hallgrimsson's settings of the surreal poetry of Daniil Kharms, featuring Callow as the narrator, was released by Hyperion Records.

Callow played Stroganoff in the 1987 Saturday Night Theatre production of A Bullet in the Ballet dramatised by Pat Hooker on BBC Radio 4.

== Personal life ==
Callow came out as gay in his 1984 book Being An Actor. He was listed 28th in The Independent's 2007 listing of the most influential gay men and women in the UK. He married his partner Sebastian Fox in June 2016.

In an interview, Callow stated:

I'm not really an activist, although I am aware that there are some political acts one can do that actually make a difference and I think my coming out as a gay man was probably one of the most valuable things I've done in my life. I don't think any actor had done so voluntarily and I think it helped to change the culture.

Although he was a prominent supporter of Stonewall when it was set up in 1989, he later chastised the organisation for the strength of its stance in favour of gender self-identification. Callow was condemned for this by trans rights supporters including gay columnist Owen Jones who wrote "There’s a long and tragic history of members of minorities who’ve won greater acceptance kicking their ladder from beneath them. That’s what Simon Callow is doing, and it’s grim".

In August 2014, Callow was one of 200 public figures who were signatories to a letter to The Guardian expressing their hope that Scotland would vote to remain part of the United Kingdom in the referendum on that issue.

In the 1999 Birthday Honours, he was appointed Commander of the Order of the British Empire (CBE) for his services to acting. In advance of the 2019 United Kingdom general election, Callow along with 24 cultural figures including John le Carré and Joanna Lumley signed a public letter refusing to vote for the Labour Party led by Jeremy Corbyn citing concerns over anti-semitism.

== Filmography ==
Key
†	Denotes films that have not yet been released

=== Film ===
Simon Callow's film credits with year of release, film titles and roles
Year	Title	Role	Notes
1984	Amadeus	Emanuel Schikaneder / Papageno	Callow originated the role of Mozart in the stage production
1985	The Good Father	Mark Varda	
1985	A Room with a View	The Reverend Mr Beebe	Nominated – BAFTA Film Award for Best Actor in a Supporting role
1987	Maurice	Mr Ducie	
1988	Manifesto	Police Chief Hunt	
1990	Postcards from the Edge	Simon Asquith	
1990	Mr. & Mrs. Bridge	Dr Alex Sauer	
1991	The Ballad of the Sad Cafe	—N/a	Director; Nominated – Golden Berlin Bear
1992	Howards End	Music and Meaning Lecturer	Cameo
1992	Soft Top Hard Shoulder	Eddie Cherdowski	
1994	Four Weddings and a Funeral	Gareth	Nominated – BAFTA Film Award for Best Actor in a Supporting Role
1994	Street Fighter	A.N. Official	
1995	England, My England	Charles II	
1995	Jefferson in Paris	Richard Cosway	Fifth Merchant-Ivory film
1995	Ace Ventura: When Nature Calls	Vincent Cadby	
1996	James and the Giant Peach	Mr Grasshopper	Voice role
1996	Victory	Zangiacomo	
1998	The Scarlet Tunic	Captain Fairfax	
1998	Bedrooms and Hallways	Keith	
1998	Shakespeare in Love	Sir Edmund Tilney	Screen Actors Guild Award for Outstanding Performance by a Cast in a Motion Picture
1999	Around the World in 80 Days	Phileas Fogg	Voice role
1999	Junk	—N/a	
1999	Notting Hill	Himself	Uncredited film-within-a-film role
2001	No Man's Land	Colonel Soft	
2001	Christmas Carol: The Movie	Ebenezer Scrooge Charles Dickens	
2002	Thunderpants	Sir John Osgood	
2002	Merci Docteur Rey	Bob	
2003	Bright Young Things	King of Anatolia	
2004	George and the Dragon	King Edgar	
2004	The Phantom of the Opera	Andre	
2005	Rag Tale	Fat Boy Rourke	
2005	The Civilization of Maxwell Bright	Mr Wroth	
2005	Bob the Butler	Mr Butler	
2006	Sabina	Eugene Bleuler	
2007	Chemical Wedding	Professor Haddo / Aleister Crowley	
2007	Arn - The Knight Templar	Father Henry	
2011	No Ordinary Trifle	Guy Witherspoon	
2012	Acts of Godfrey	Godfrey	
2014	Magician: The Astonishing Life and Work of Orson Welles	Himself	
2016	Golden Years	Royston	
2016	Viceroy's House	Cyril Radcliffe	
2017	Hampstead	The Judge	
2017	Victoria & Abdul	Giacomo Puccini	
2017	The Man Who Invented Christmas	John Leech	
2018	Blue Iguana	Uncle Martin	
2022	Surprised by Oxford	Dr Sterling	
2022	The Pay Day	Gates	
2023	Doctor Jekyll	Journalist	
2023	Murder Ballads: How to Make It in Rock 'n' Roll	Richard O'Keefe	
2024	Winnie-the-Pooh: Blood and Honey 2	Cavendish	
2025	Eternal Return	Malcolm	
2026	The Man with the Plan	William Beveridge	

=== Television ===
Simon Callow's television credits with year of release, film titles and roles
Year	Title	Role	Notes
1975	Get Some In!	Wally	Episode: "36-Hour Pass"
1976	The Sweeney	Detective Sergeant	Episode: "Down to You, Brother"
1980	Play for Today	Max	Episode: "Instant Enlightenment Including VAT"
1981	The Man of Destiny	Napoleon	Television film
1981	W.H. Auden Monologue	W.H. Auden	Television film
1984–1986	Chance in a Million	Tom Chance	19 episodes
1985	Honour, Profit and Pleasure	Handel	Television film
1986	Dead Head	Hugo Silver	2 episodes
1986	David Copperfield	Mr Micawber	7 episodes
1987	Inspector Morse	Theodore Kemp	Episode: "The Wolvercote Tongue"
1990	Screen Two	Nathaniel Quass	Episode: "Old Flames"
1993	Femme Fatale	Vicar Ronnie	
1994	Little Napoleons	Edward Feathers	
1995	El pasajero clandestino	Major Owens	
1996	An Audience With Charles Dickens	Charles Dickens	
1997	The Woman in White	Count Fosco	
1998	Trial & Retribution II	Rupert Halliday	
2000	The Mystery of Charles Dickens	Charles Dickens	Television film
2001	Don't Eat the Neighbours	Fox & Bear	
2002	NOVA: Galileo's Battle for the Heavens	Galileo	Documentary
2003	Angels in America	Prior Walter ancestor No. 2	Miniseries
2004	Shoebox Zoo	Wolfgang the Wolf; Hunter the Horse	12 episodes
2004	Agatha Christie's Marple	Colonel Terence Melchett	Episode: "The Body in the Library"
2005	Rome	Publius Servilius Isauricus	Episode: "Egeria"
2005, 2011	Doctor Who	Charles Dickens	Episodes: "The Unquiet Dead", "The Wedding of River Song"
2006	Midsomer Murders	Dr. Richard Wellow	Episode: "Dead Letters"
2006	Classical Destinations	Narrator	
2007	Roman Mysteries	Pliny the Elder	Episodes: "The Secrets of Vesuvius"
2007	The Company	Elihu	
2007	How Gay Sex Changed the World	Himself	
2007	Trick or Treat	Himself	Episode: "#1.4"
2008	The Mr. Men Show	Narrator	2 series (UK re-dub)
2009	Lewis	Vernon Oxe	Episode: "Counter Culture Blues"
2009	The Sarah Jane Adventures	Tree Blathereen	Voice; Episode: "The Gift"
2011	This is Jinsy	Threcker	Episode: "Nameworm"
2011	Popstar to Operastar	Himself	13 episodes
2011	Jamie's Dream School	Himself	4 episodes
2013	Agatha Christie's Poirot	Dr Heinrich Lutz	Episode: "The Labours of Hercules"
2014–2016	Outlander	The Duke of Sandringham	5 episodes
2014	Plebs	Victor	Episode: "The Candidate"
2014	The Feeling Nuts Comedy Night	Himself	Episode: "#2"
2015	Ant & Dec's Saturday Night Takeaway	Guest in The End of The Show Show	2 episodes
2016	Galavant	Edwin the Magnificent	Episode: "World's Best Kiss"
2016	The Rebel	Henry Palmer	Lead character
2016	The Life of Rock with Brian Pern	Bennett St John	Episode: "The Thotch Reunion"
2017	George III: The Genius of the Mad King	George III	Voice role; BBC documentary
2017	Midsomer Murders	Vernon De Harthog	Episode: "The Curse of the Ninth"
2017	Sarah & Duck	Poetry Pete	Episode: "Mountain Mints"
2018	Death in Paradise	Larry South	Episode: "Written in Murder"
2018	A Christmas Carol	Narrator/Actor	Television film
2018	The Dead Room	Aubrey Judd	Television film
2021	Hawkeye	Armand Duquesne III	Episode: "Never Meet Your Heroes"
2021	The Amazing Mr. Blunden	Mr Blunden	Television film
2021–2023	The Witcher	Codringher	2 episodes
2022	Inside No. 9	Dick	Episode: "The Bones of St Nicholas"
2023	The Cleaner	Mr Abahassine	Episode: "The Clown"
2023	Dodger	The Archbishop of Canterbury	Episode: "Coronation"
2024	The Boy That Never Was	Cozimo	Miniseries
2025	Étoile	Crispin Shamblee	Main cast
2026	The Northumbria Mysteries	Father David Rutherford	Recurring role

== Bibliography ==
- Callow, Simon (1986) [1984], Being an Actor, St. Martin's Press, ISBN 978-0-312-07276-6, OCLC 13092196
- Callow, Simon (1991), Acting in Restoration Comedy, The Applause acting series, Applause Theatre Books, ISBN 978-1-55783-119-4, OCLC 24218256
- Callow, Simon (1995), Orson Welles: Volume 1: The Road to Xanadu, Jonathan Cape, ISBN 978-0-224-03852-2, OCLC 32454874
- Callow, Simon (1997), Charles Laughton: A Difficult Actor, Fromm International Pub, ISBN 978-0-88064-180-7, OCLC 36315809
- Callow, Simon (2000), The Night of the Hunter, BFI film classics, BFI Publishing, ISBN 978-0-85170-822-5, OCLC 59582358
- Callow, Simon (2000), Oscar Wilde and His Circle, NPG character sketches, National Portrait Gallery, ISBN 978-1-85514-312-8, OCLC 44851360
- Callow, Simon (2003), Dickens' Christmas: A Victorian Celebration, Harry N. Abrams, ISBN 978-0-8109-4534-0, OCLC 51942509
- Callow, Simon (2003), Shooting the Actor, Picador, ISBN 978-0-312-42244-8, OCLC 52178208
- Callow, Simon (2006), Orson Welles: Volume 2: Hello Americans, Jonathan Cape, ISBN 978-0-224-03853-9, OCLC 63185891
- Callow, Simon (2007), Love Is Where It Falls, Nick Hern, ISBN 978-1-85459-976-6, OCLC 77258353
- Callow, Simon (2012), Charles Dickens and the Great Theatre of the World, Vintage Books, ISBN 9780345803238
- Callow, Simon (2015), Orson Welles: Volume 3: One-Man Band, Jonathan Cape
- Callow, Simon (2017), Being Wagner, William Collins, ISBN 9780008105693
