= The Sleep Room =

1998 Canadian television film

The Sleep Room is a 1998 Canadian television film about experiments on Canadian mental patients that were carried out in the 1950s and 1960s by Donald Ewen Cameron and funded by the CIA's MKUltra program. It originally aired as a miniseries and is based on the book In The Sleep Room: The Story of CIA Brainwashing Experiments in Canada by Anne Collins.

The first half of the film details the evolution of Cameron's experiments using a procedure he called psychic driving which included continuous loop taped messages while the patients were under the influence of curare and LSD, as well as intensive electroshock treatments. The second half covers the legal efforts of the patients and their attorneys in the 1980s to obtain a settlement. The film was directed by Anne Wheeler and starred Leon Pownall, Macha Grenon, Nicola Cavendish, Donald Moffat, Diego Matamoros, Jean-Guy Bouchard, Emmanuel Bilodeau and Marina Orsini. It won several Gemini awards, including best television movie, best direction, best performance, best sound, and outstanding special effects in make-up.

== Plot ==
Dr. Ewen Cameron, as the head of the Allan Memorial Institute in Quebec, Canada, was interested in the repatterning of the brains of those with mental illnesses. He hypothesized that mental illness could be attributed to learning the wrong responses to situations. Cameron's study aimed to de-pattern the brain into an essentially infantile state, before re-patterning the brain to learn the correct responses to situations. The infantile state included a loss of the ability to speak, walk or control one's bowels and was generally irreversible.

Cameron's primary method of de-patterning the brain was to place patients in a medically induced coma for several weeks at a time, while delivering powerful electric shocks used to further disorient the brain. This effectively wiped the minds and memories of many of his patients and is one of the greatest ethical dilemmas of this study.

== Cast ==
- Leon Pownall as Dr. Ewen Cameron
- Macha Grenon as Nathalie Belding
- Nicola Cavendish as Ruth Farmer
- Gabrielle Rose as Nurse Stephens
- Emmanuel Bilodeau as Dandain
- France Castel as Florence "Flo" Langelben
- Diego Matamoros as Dr. Goldman
- Bruce Dinsmore as Dr. Burns
- Eric Peterson as Sal Rothenberg
- Donald Moffat as Joseph Rauh
- Marina Orsini as Jane Conroy
- Frank Moore as Mr. Krantz
- Nicholas Campbell as Lucas
- Blu Mankuma as Judge Locke
- Daniel Kash as Aaron Rothenberg
- Daniel Pilon as James Belding
- Neil Foster as Philip Farmer
- Bryn McAuley as Marsha Farmer
- Jean-Guy Bouchard as Mr. Beers
- Neil Kroetsch as Leonard Rubenstein
- Ian Beny Anderson as Young Aaron Rothenberg
- Emma Campbell as Nurse Mandruciak
- Lisa Browyn Moore as Nurse Kelly
- Alan Fawcett as CIA Agent Joe Clark
- Howard Bilerman as CIA Agent Phil Jones
- Maurice Podbrey as Dr. Gottlieb
- Tom Rack as Dr. Weinrich
- Leni Parker as Sadie Rothenberg
- Norris Domingue as Arthur Fielder
- Michel McGill as Quincy
- Harry Standjofski as Stumpel
- Tony Robinow as Laetner
- Joy Coghill as Mrs. Olson
- James Bradford as Dr. Lashbrook
- Serge Houde as Mr. Lachance
- Laurel Paetz as Lynn McKenna, 5th Estate
- Paul Stewart as Mr. Hawden
- Dean Hagopian as Mr. Gaylen
- Lise Roy as Barb
- Ed Broadbent as Himself (archive footage)
- Brian Mulroney as Himself (archive footage)
- Ronald Reagan as Himself (archive footage)
