= Lulu (1996 film) =

1996 film

- Directed by: Srinivas Krishna
- Written by: Srinivas Krishna; Robert Armstrong
- Produced by: Robert Bergman; Srinivas Krishna
- Starring: Kim Lieu
- Cinematography: Paul Sarossy
- Edited by: Mike Munn
- Music by: Leslie Winston
- Production companies: Divani Films; Lightshow Communications
- Distributed by: Alliance Communications
- Release date: May 1996
- Running time: 96 minutes
- Country: Canada
- Language: English

Lulu is a 1996 Canadian drama film directed by Srinivas Krishna. It was screened in the Un Certain Regard section at the 1996 Cannes Film Festival.

The film stars Kim Lieu as Khuyen, a Vietnamese woman who comes to Canada as a mail-order bride, marrying Lucky (Michael Rhoades) with the intention of gaining Canadian citizenship so that she can sponsor her parents to come to Canada and escape Vietnam's oppressive government, only to get mixed up in organized crime when she meets Clive (Clark Johnson), a hustler on the run from local crime boss Kingsley (Saeed Jaffrey).

The film was Lieu's first ever acting role; Krishna cast her in the film after discovering her working at a corner store in Kensington Market.

Following its premiere at Cannes, the film was subsequently screened at the 1996 Montreal World Film Festival, and at the 1996 Toronto International Film Festival.

== Cast ==
- Kim Lieu - Khuyen
- Clark Johnson - Clive
- Michael Rhoades - Lucky
- Manuel Aranguiz
- Peter Breck
- Saeed Jaffrey - Kingsley
- Nghi Do
- Phuong Dan Nguten
- Richard Chevolleau
- Kay Tremblay
- Jack Jessop
- Dick Callahan
- Paul Persofsky
- Christofer Williamson
- Tony Meyler
