= Psychic driving =

Psychiatric procedure (1950s-1960s)

Psychic driving was a psychiatric procedure that patients felt was torturous, (as it relates to torture or suffering, and it describes experiences or processes that are very painful or distressing) developed in the 1950s and 1960s in which patients are subjected to a continuously repeated audio message, for example, on a looped tape, to alter their behaviour, obstruct their thinking and cause psychological pain and trauma. In the original cases of psychic driving, patients were often exposed to hundreds of thousands of repetitions of a single statement over the course of their treatment. They were also concurrently administered muscular paralytic drugs such as curare to subdue them for the purposes of exposure to the looped messages. The procedure was pioneered by Donald Ewen Cameron, at McGill University's new Allan Memorial Institute, and used and funded by the CIA's Project MKUltra program in Canada.

== Psychiatry and MKUltra ==
The psychic driving procedure was a chronological precursor to Cameron's depatterning, the latter involving massive doses of electroconvulsive therapy (ECT) combined with similarly large doses of psychedelic drugs (such as LSD). The intent was to break down the subject's personality—theoretically psychic driving could then be used with some efficacy in establishing a new personality. In Cameron's depatterning, the ECT would often continue to be administered despite the manifestation of convulsive fits, which were consensually considered to be contraindications to normal and safe ECT procedure. Such biologically and psychologically devastating procedures, adopted internationally by the psychiatric establishment, were largely abolished by the time the CIA was brought before a Senate Hearing (1977) for its involvement and funding of Cameron's experimental activities—as part of the MKULTRA program. The topic of Cameron's psychic driving is dealt with in some detail in the docudrama entitled The Sleep Room (1998) directed by Anne Wheeler.

== Other uses ==
Similar techniques are alleged to have been used in the kidnapping and death of CIA operative William Francis Buckley by Aziz al-Abub, a medical doctor from Beirut who was seen as epitomizing medical torture. Aziz al-Abub, also known as Ibrahim al-Nadhir, was known for using his medical training to refine torture techniques. His techniques were shown to be closely connected to the CIA-developed torture techniques. As with the CIA, he used drugs to make it easier to handle those he tortured, carefully determined how long to keep a prisoner hooded and when to isolate them and other techniques seen as medical torture.

== In popular culture ==
Initially, in the NBC TV series Hannibal, Dr. Chilton uses psychic driving on a patient of the Baltimore State Hospital for the Criminally Insane, Dr. Abel Gideon (played by Eddie Izzard), to convince him that he is the main antagonist of the series, the Chesapeake Ripper. Later in the series, psychic driving is alluded to by the main character Dr. Hannibal Lecter as a means to convince FBI profiler Will Graham that he has committed a string of brutal murders during a bout of encephalitis, to throw him off the trail and keep himself safe. Dr. Lecter uses psychic driving by purposely inducing trance-like states during a therapy session, using Will Graham's encephalitis, then reinforcing his delusions that he has killed during episodes of lost time where he cannot remember his own actions.

Aaron Dilloway's 2010 album Psychic Driving Tapes is based on the concept, and heavily utilizes tape loops in its composition.

In an episode of The Walking Dead, Daryl Dixon is taken prisoner by the Saviours. As part of his torture, he locked in a small room and forced to listen to the song "Easy Street" on repeat for days.

== See also ==
- The Men Who Stare At Goats
- William Sargant
- Behavior modification
