= Red Serge (TV series) =

Canadian TV series

- Genre: Comedy drama
- Starring: Ed McNamara; Nicola Cavendish; Tom McBeath; C. David Johnson; Gordon Tootoosis; Terence Kelly
- Country of origin: Canada
- No. of seasons: 2
- No. of episodes: 12

Production
- Running time: 30 minutes

Original release
- Network: CBC Television
- Release: 1986 – 1987

Red Serge is a Canadian television comedy-drama series, which aired on CBC Television in 1986 and 1987.

A Western set in the 1880s, the series starred Ed McNamara as Abe Farwell, an American expatriate with criminal ties running a saloon in a small town near the Alberta-Montana border with the help of Lily (Nicola Cavendish), Emma (Brenda Robins) and Maisy (Hilary Strang) Chadwick, the adult daughters of his deceased former business partner. The series also starred Tom McBeath, C. David Johnson, Bruce McMillan, Terence Kelly, Greg Ellwand and David Matheson as officers with the local Royal Canadian Mounted Police detachment, and Gordon Tootoosis as the chief of a nearby First Nations reserve. Each of the Chadwick sisters was also in a romantic relationship with one of the RCMP officers, complicating Farwell's attempts to hide the saloon's forays into illegal bootlegging and gambling.

Produced under the working title Red Serge Wives, the series went to air under the title Red Serge. It premiered on CBC Television in January 1986 for a six-episode run, and was renewed for a second six-episode season which aired in winter 1987. The series garnered Gemini Award nominations for Best Dramatic Miniseries at the 1st Gemini Awards in 1986, and for Best Drama Series at the 2nd Gemini Awards in 1987. Although at least 13 more episodes had been planned, a combination of budget cuts at the CBC and McNamara's death in late 1986, shortly after having completed filming the episodes which aired in 1987, led to the series being cancelled after its second season.
