= The Grocer's Wife =

The Grocer’s Wife
- Directed by: John Pozer
- Written by: John Pozer
- Produced by: John Pozer
- Starring: Simon Webb; Susinn McFarlene; Nicola Cavendish; Jay Brazeau; Andrea Rankin; Leroy Schultz
- Cinematography: Peter Wunstorf
- Edited by: Reginald Harkema; John Pozer
- Music by: Mark Korven
- Release date: September 5, 1991 (TIFF)
- Running time: 104 minutes
- Country: Canada
- Language: English

The Grocer's Wife is a 1991 Canadian drama film written, produced and directed by John Pozer. It won the inaugural Claude Jutra Award for best feature film by a first-time director.

== Synopsis ==
Set in Trail, British Columbia, the film stars Simon Webb as Tim Midley, an emissions inspector at the local smokestack who lives with his domineering mother Mildred (Andrea Rankin). When his mother falls ill, he invites stripper Anita Newlove (Susinn McFarlen) to move in with him, while simultaneously fending off the advances of Mrs. Friendly (Nicola Cavendish), the wife of the neighbourhood grocer.

The film was also noted for giving rise to the "West Coast Wave" of Canadian filmmakers in the 1990s; several film students who would later go on to become prominent in Canadian cinema, including directors Lynne Stopkewich, Mina Shum and Bruce Sweeney, editor and director Reginald Harkema and cinematographer Greg Middleton, worked on The Grocer's Wife as one of their first filmmaking jobs.

== Awards ==
The film premiered at the 1991 Toronto International Film Festival, where it received an honorable mention from the Best Canadian Film jury. Although an honorable mention comes with no financial recompense, Atom Egoyan, who had won the award for The Adjuster, declined his $25,000 winner's cheque and instead gave it to Pozer.

Cavendish won the Genie Award for Best Supporting Actress at the 14th Genie Awards. At the same ceremony, Pozer won the Claude Jutra Award, and Mark Korven was nominated for Best Original Score.

== Cast ==
- Simon Webb as Tim Midley
- Susinn McFarlen as Anita Newlove
- Nicola Cavendish as Mrs. Friendly
- Jay Brazeau as Barber
- Andrea Rankin as Mildred Midley
- Alec Burden as Hermann Melzer
- LeRoy Schulz as Mr. Friendly
- Walter Mills as Minister
