= Little Napoleons =

Little Napoleons is a 1994 Channel 4 television serial starring Saeed Jaffrey, Norman Beaton, Simon Callow and Lesley Manville as four politicians involved in local council elections. Beaton and Jaffrey play rival Labour candidates while Callow is their Conservative colleague.
