= Tom McSorley =

Canadian film critic and scholar

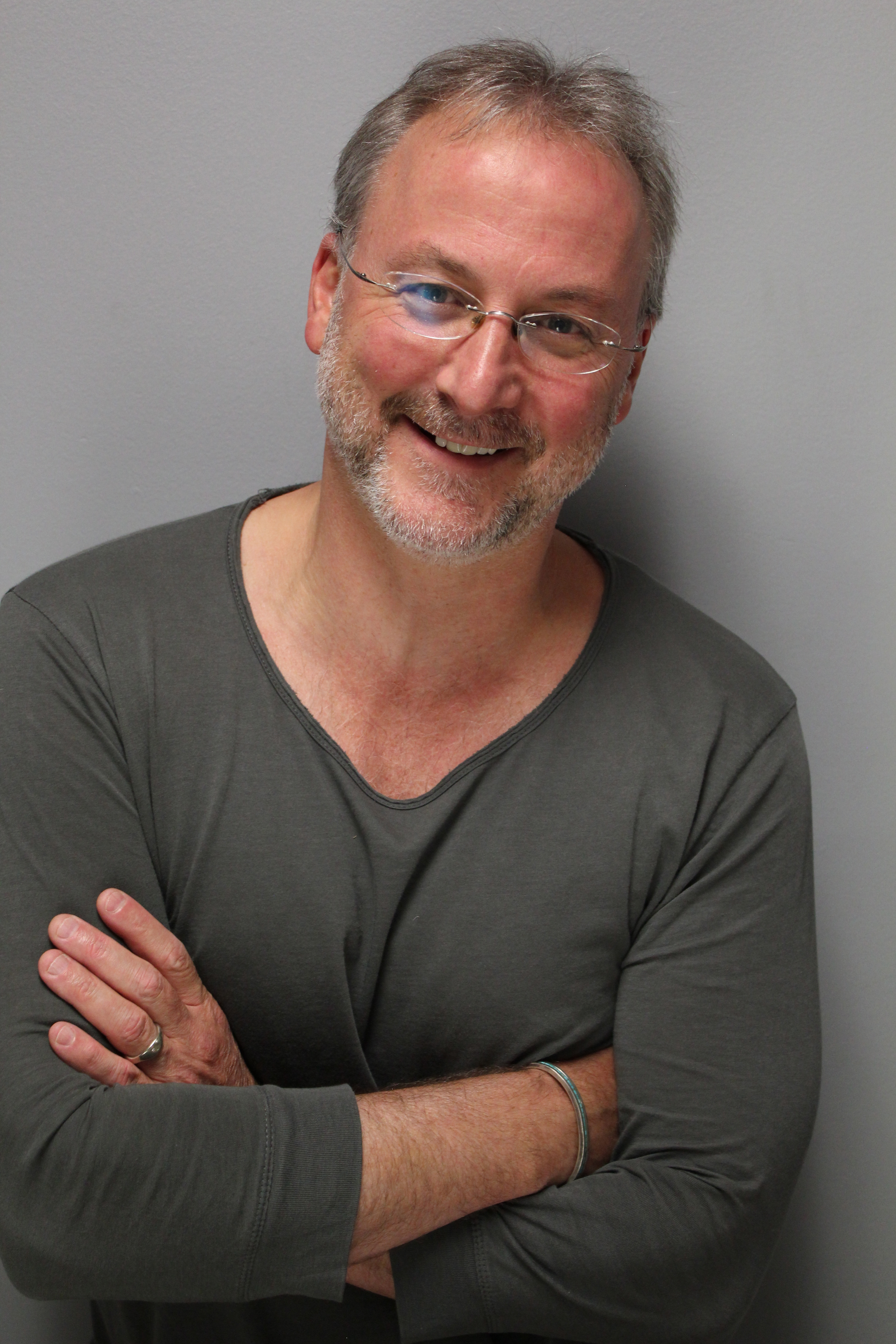
Tom McSorley

Tom McSorley (born Thomas Holland McSorley) is a Canadian film critic and scholar, based in Ottawa, Ontario.

He is the Executive Director of the Canadian Film Institute. He is also a sessional lecturer in Film Studies, at Carleton University; a freelance film and former theatre critic for CBC Radio One; the editor of Rivers of Time: The Films of Philip Hoffman (2008); and co-editor of Self Portraits: The Cinemas of Canada Since Telefilm (2006) and Life Without Death: The Cinema of Frank Cole (2009). He is the author of numerous articles and book chapters on Canadian and international cinema, and the author of a new critical study on Atom Egoyan’s 1991 feature film, The Adjuster (2009). In 1997, McSorley created the annual Latin American Film Festival as a key component of the Canadian Film Institute's ongoing international film programming in Canada's capital. He is also the singer and drummer in the Ottawa-based rock band Presence and his alter ego, Sam Menard, was the drummer for ska rockabilly band The Pelts.
