= Srinivas Krishna =

Indo-Canadian director

Srinivas Krishna is an Indo-Canadian film and television director, most noted as the director, writer and lead actor of the 1991 film Masala.

Born in India, Krishna moved to Canada with his family in childhood.

Masala premiered at the 1991 Toronto International Film Festival. The film, which drew on some the cinematic traditions of Bollywood rather than relying solely on the social realist conventions of Canadian film, has come to be recognized, alongside Deepa Mehta's contemporaneous Sam & Me, as being the first major landmark films about the Indo-Canadian experience.

Krishna followed up in 1996 with the film Lulu, which premiered in the Un Certain Regard section at the 1996 Cannes Film Festival.

After Lulu, Krishna principally directed television, with his credits including episodes of Lexx and The Smart Woman Survival Guide, as well as having an acting role in Phillip Barker's short film Soul Cages. He returned to film in 2009 with the documentary Ganesh, Boy Wonder, about a young boy in India undergoing facial reconstruction surgery after being born with a severe facial disfigurement.

In 2011, he curated an exhibition for Toronto's Luminato Festival, celebrating the work of Indian film director Raj Kapoor.

In 2023, Telefilm Canada announced that Masala was one of 23 titles that would be digitally restored under its new Canadian Cinema Reignited program to preserve classic Canadian films. The restored version screened in the Classics program at the 2024 Toronto International Film Festival.
