= Nicola Cavendish =

British actress

- Born: 11 November 1952 (age 73); Cirencester, Gloucestershire, England
- Occupation: Actress
- Years active: 1970s–present

Nicola Cavendish (born 11 November 1952) is a British–Canadian actress.

== Early life ==
Cavendish was born in Cirencester, Gloucestershire, England and brought up in British Columbia, Canada. She began her acting career in the mid-1970s.

== Career ==
Her theatre roles have included cross-Canada tours starring in Shirley Valentine and For the Pleasure of Seeing Her Again. Her other film roles include Suddenly Naked, Air Bud and My American Cousin. Television roles include Virgin River (TV series), the 1990 television mini-series version of Stephen King's It, Men in Trees, The L Word, Highlander: The Series, The X-Files, Street Legal and Red Serge. She has won a Genie Award for Best Performance by an Actress in a Supporting Role for the 1991 film The Grocer's Wife and a Gemini Award nomination for the 1998 film The Sleep Room.

== Filmography ==
=== Film ===
Year	Title	Role	Notes
1985	My American Cousin	Gladys Rutherford	
1989	American Boyfriends	Mrs. Day	
1990	The Comic Book Christmas Caper	Aunt Dottie	
1991	The Grocer's Wife	Mrs. Friendly	
1993	View from the Typewriter	Narrator	
1997	Air Bud	Principal Pepper	
1998	The Sleep Room	Ruth Farmer	
2001	Suddenly Naked	Suzanne Steinman	
2013	The Bouquet	Bonnie Benton	

=== Television ===
Year	Title	Role	Notes
1980	Huckleberry Finn and His Friends	Charlotte Grangerford	2 episodes
1988	The Beachcombers	Const. Cleo Gorcey	Episode: "Miserable Sinner"
1990	It	Desk Clerk	Episode: "Part 2"
1993	The Diviners	Ella	Television film
1993	Street Legal	Pauline Harper	Episode: "Truth, Lies and Consequences"
1994	The X-Files	Nurse Owens	Episode: "One Breath"
1995	Serving in Silence: The Margarethe Cammermeyer Story	Susan	Television film
1995	Highlander: The Series	Queen Anne	Television film
1998	The Wonderful World of Disney	Penelope	Episode: "Noah"
1999	Sabrina: The Animated Series	Voice	7 episodes
2001	Mentors	Emily Carr	Episode: "Work in Progress"
2004	The L Word	Prison Matron	Episode: "Locked Up"
2006	Men in Trees	Pam Mitexi	Episode: "Sink or Swim"
2008	The Guard	Vera	Episode: "When I'm Sixty Four"
2014	The Memory Book	Mabel Potter	Television film
2014	The Christmas Secret	Betty	Television film
2015	The Returned	Mia Darrow	2 episodes
2015	The Christmas Note	Betty	Television film
2015	The Romeo Section	Helen	5 episodes
2019–present	Virgin River	Connie	25 episodes
