= The Falls (1991 film) =

1991 Canadian documentary film

- Directed by: Kevin McMahon
- Written by: Kevin McMahon
- Produced by: Michael McMahon; Brian Dennis
- Narrated by: Rita McMahon
- Cinematography: Douglas Koch
- Edited by: Michael McMahon
- Music by: Kurt Swinghammer
- Production companies: Channel Four Films; Primitive Features
- Release date: September 1991 (TIFF)
- Running time: 89 minutes
- Country: Canada
- Language: English

The Falls is a Canadian documentary film, directed by Kevin McMahon and released in 1991. The film is an exploration of the cultural significance held by Niagara Falls in the collective imagination.

According to McMahon, "It would have been very easy to do something trite and cheap and ironic — you know, making fun of Niagara Falls as a tourist trap. But I was interested in exploring the mythic side of it." Instead, he tried to make a film which encompassed all aspects of the Niagara Falls area, including poetic meditation on the power and force of the falls themselves, an acknowledgement of the tacky aspects of the Clifton Hill tourist district, and an exploration of the environmental consequences of pollution and hydroelectric development in the area, including the controversy around Love Canal.

The film was screened for distributors at the Cannes Film Market in May 1991, and had its public premiere at the 1991 Festival of Festivals, before having a limited commercial release in October.

== Response ==
Jay Scott of The Globe and Mail praised the film, writing that "eventually, the film intermarries the naturally sacred and the unnaturally profane with breathtaking dexterity. An innocuous water slide, for instance, suggests technologically induced pollution; happy tourists in yellow slickers walk through a tunnel to an observation deck, appearing unearthly and ominous, like aliens from a science-fiction film or mad medical technicians on their way to perform sadistic experiments; and the sterile hydroelectric installations recall both the dystopian nightmare city of Metropolis and the high-tech space station utopia of 2001: A Space Odyssey. "It's all in the framing" - The Falls has brilliantly framed Niagara Falls as the picture of a civilization."

Elizabeth Aird of the Vancouver Sun rated the film five stars, writing that "It's as absurdly funny as Errol Morris's Gates of Heaven (about pet cemeteries), as ironically funny as Laurie Anderson's musings about the modern world, and as sad, just plain old sad, as any document about humankind's need to subjugate nature could be."

The film received a Genie Award nomination for Best Feature Length Documentary at the 12th Genie Awards in 1991.
