= Donald Ewen Cameron =

Scottish-American psychiatrist (1901–1967)

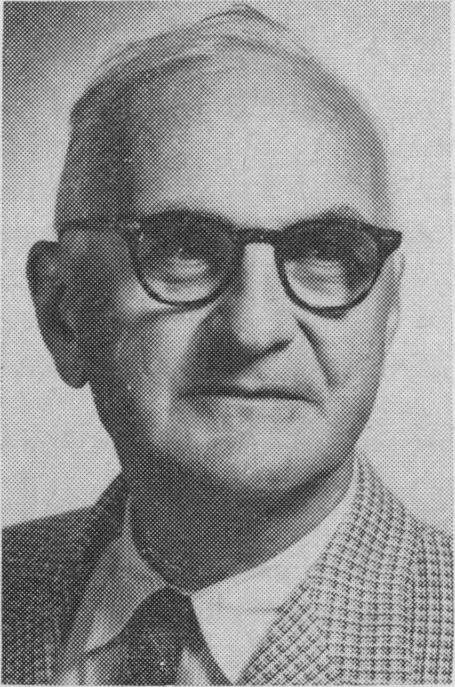
- Cameron, c. 1967
- Born: 24 December 1901; Bridge of Allan, Stirlingshire, Scotland
- Died: 8 September 1967 (aged 65); Lake Placid, New York, U.S.
- Spouse: Jean C. Rankine (m. 1933)
- Children: 4
- Scientific career
- Fields: Psychiatry, mind control
- Workplaces: Albany Medical College, McGill University

Donald Ewen Cameron (24 December 1901 – 8 September 1967) was a Scottish-born psychiatrist. He is largely known today for his central role in unethical medical experiments, and development of psychological and medical torture techniques for the Central Intelligence Agency. He served as president of the American Psychiatric Association (1952–1953), Canadian Psychiatric Association (1958–1959), American Psychopathological Association (1963), Society of Biological Psychiatry (1965) and the World Psychiatric Association (1961–1966).

In spite of his high professional reputation, he has been criticized for, among other things, his experimentation on adults and children, administering electroconvulsive therapy and experimental drugs, including poisons such as curare and hallucinogens such as lysergic acid diethylamide (LSD), to patients and prisoners without their knowledge or informed consent. Some of this work took place in the context of the Project MKUltra program for the developing of mind control and torture techniques, psychoactive poisons, and behavior modification systems. Decades after his own death, the psychic driving technique he developed continued to see extensive use in the torture of prisoners around the world.

== Early life and career ==
Donald Ewen Cameron was born in Bridge of Allan, Scotland, the oldest son of a Presbyterian minister. He received an M.B., Ch.B from the University of Glasgow in 1924, a D.P.M. from the University of London in 1925, and an M.D. with distinction from the University of Glasgow in 1936.

Cameron began his training in psychiatry at the Glasgow Royal Mental Hospital in 1925. In 1926, he served as assistant medical officer there and was introduced to psychiatrist Sir David Henderson, a student of Swiss-born US psychiatrist Adolf Meyer. He continued his training in the United States under Meyer at the Phipps Clinic, Johns Hopkins Hospital in Baltimore, Maryland from 1926 to 1928 with a Henderson Research Scholarship.

In 1928, Cameron left Baltimore for the Burghölzli, the psychiatric hospital of the University of Zurich, in Switzerland, where he studied under Hans W. Maier, the successor of Swiss psychiatrist Eugen Bleuler, who had significantly influenced psychiatric thinking. There he met A. T. Mathers, Manitoba's principal psychiatrist, who convinced Cameron in 1929 to move to Brandon, the second largest city of Manitoba, Canada. Cameron stayed there for seven years and was made physician-in-charge of the Reception Unit of the Provincial Mental Hospital. He also organized the structure of mental health services in the western half of the province, establishing 10 functioning clinics; this model was used as the blueprint for similar efforts in Montreal and a forerunner of 1960s community health models.

In 1933, he married Jean C. Rankine, whom he had met while they were students at the University of Glasgow. She was a former captain of the Scottish field hockey team, a competitive tennis player, and lecturer in mathematics at the University of Glasgow. They had four children; a daughter and three sons.

In 1936, he moved to Massachusetts to become director of the research division at Worcester State Hospital only 1 year later. In 1936, he also published his first book, Objective and Experimental Psychiatry which introduced his belief that psychiatry should approach the study of human behavior in a rigorous, scientific fashion rooted in biology. His theories of behavior stressed the unity of the organism with the environment; the book also outlined experimental method and research design. Cameron believed firmly in clinical psychiatry and a strict scientific method.

In 1938 he moved to Albany, New York, where he received his diplomate in psychiatry and thus was certified in psychiatry. From 1939 to 1943 he was professor of neurology and psychiatry at Albany Medical College, and at the Russell Sage School of Nursing, also in the Albany area. During those years, Cameron began to expand on his thoughts about the interrelationships of mind and body, developing a reputation as a psychiatrist who could bridge the gap between the organic, structural neurologists, and the psychiatrists whose knowledge of anatomy was limited to maps of the mind as opposed to maps of the brain. Through his instruction of nurses and psychiatrists he became an authority in his areas of concentration.

Cameron focused primarily on biological descriptive psychiatry and applied the British and European schools and models of the practice. Cameron followed these schools in demanding that mental disturbances are diseases and somatic in nature; all psychological illness would therefore be hardwired, a product of the body and the direct result of a patient's biological structure rather than caused by social environments. Characteristics were thus diagnosed as syndromes emerging from the brain. It is at this juncture that he became interested with how he could effectively manipulate the brain to control and understand the processes of memory. He furthermore wanted to understand the problems of memory caused by aging, believing that the aged brain experienced psychosis.

In 1943, Cameron was invited to McGill University in Montreal by neurosurgeon Dr Wilder Penfield. With a grant from the Rockefeller Foundation, money from John Wilson McConnell of the Montreal Star, and a gift of Sir Hugh Allan's mansion on Mount Royal, the Allan Memorial Institute for psychiatry was founded. Cameron became the first director of the Allan Memorial Institute as well as the first chairman of the Department of Psychiatry at McGill. He recruited psychoanalysts, social psychiatrists and biologists globally to develop the psychiatry program at McGill. From its beginning in 1943, the Allan Memorial Institute was run on an "open door" basis, allowing patients to leave if they wished, as opposed to the "closed door" policy of other hospitals in Canada in the early 1940s. In 1946, Cameron introduced the practice of the day hospital, the first of its kind in North America, permitting patients to remain at home while receiving treatment at the institute during the day, thus avoiding unnecessary hospitalization and allowing the patients to maintain ties with their community and family.

== Nuremberg trials ==
In 1945, Cameron, Nolan D. C. Lewis and Paul L. Schroeder, colonel and psychiatrist, University College of Illinois, were invited to the Nuremberg trials for a psychiatric evaluation of Rudolf Hess. Their diagnosis was amnesia and hysteria, per a short commentary in the Journal of the American Medical Association. Hess later confessed that he had faked the amnesia.

Before his arrival in Nuremberg, Cameron had written The Social Reorganization of Germany, in which he argued that German culture and its individual citizens would have to be transformed and reorganized. In his analysis, German culture was made up of people who had the need for status, worshipped strict order and regimentation, desired authoritarian leadership and had a deeply ingrained fear of other countries. The paper stated that German culture and its people would have offspring bound to become a threat to world peace in 30 years. To prevent this, the West would have to take measures to reorganize German society. Other similar psychiatric diagnoses of Germany were published during this time.

Cameron next published Nuremberg and Its Significance. In this, he hoped to establish a suitable method to reinstate a form of justice in Germany that could prevent its society from recreating the attitudes that led it from the Great War to World War II. Cameron viewed German society throughout history as continually giving rise to fearsome aggression. He came up with the idea that if he presented the world and confronted the Germans with the atrocities committed during the war, the world and the Germans would refrain from repeated acts of extreme aggression.; if the greater population of Germany saw the atrocities of World War II, they would surely submit to a re-organized system of justice. Cameron decided that Germans would be most likely to commit atrocities due to their historical, biological, racial and cultural past and their particular psychological nature. All Germans on trial would be assessed according to the likeliness for committing the crime.

Cameron began to develop broader theories of society, new concepts of human relations to replace concepts he deemed dangerous and outdated. These became the basis of a new social and behavioural science that he would later institute through his presidencies of the Canadian, American and World Psychiatric Associations, the American Psychopathological Association and the Society of Biological Psychiatry. With the results of the Manhattan Project, Cameron feared that without proper re-organization of society, atomic weapons could fall into the hands of new, fearsome aggressors. Cameron argued that it was necessary for behavioral scientists to act as the social planners of society, and that the United Nations could provide a conduit for implementing his ideas for applying psychiatric elements to global governance and politics.

Cameron started to distinguish populations between "the weak" and "the strong". Those with anxieties or insecurities and who had trouble with the state of the world were labelled as "the weak"; in Cameron's analysis, they could not cope with life and had to be isolated from society by "the strong". The mentally ill were thus labelled as not only sick, but also weak. Cameron further argued that "the weak" must not influence children. He promoted a philosophy where chaos could be prevented by removing the weak from society.

== Social and intrapsychic behaviour analysis ==
In the late 1940s and early 1950s, Cameron continued his work on memory and its relationship to aging. He published a book called Remembering and extended psychiatric links to human biology. In papers published during this time he linked RNA to memory. He furthered his diagnostic definitions of clinical states such as anxiety, depression and schizophrenia.

He began to develop the discipline of social psychiatry which concentrated on the roles of interpersonal interaction, family, community and culture in the emergence and amelioration of emotional disturbance. Cameron placed the psychiatric treatment unit inside of the hospital and inspected its success. Here in the hospital Cameron could observe how the psychiatric patient resembled patients with other diseases that were not psychiatric in nature. In this manner, somatic causes could be compared. The behaviour of a mental patient could resemble the behaviour of a patient with, for example, syphilis, and then a somatic cause could be deduced for a psychological illness. Cameron titled this procedure "intrapsychic" (a term derived from the psycho-somatic relationship of hospital patients).

Cameron began to abandon the Freudian unconscious in favour of a social constructivist's view of mental illness. In his analysis, culture and society played a crucial role in the ability for one to function according to the demands necessary for human survival. Therefore, society should function to select out the weak and unwanted, those apt towards fearsome aggression that threatened society. Psychiatry would play a disciplinary role.

Cameron began to explore how industrial conditions could satisfy the population through work and what kind of person or worker is best suited to industrial conditions. A stronger personality would be able to maintain itself in heavy industrial situations, he theorised, while the weaker would not be able to cope with industrial conditions. Cameron would analyze what conditions produced the stronger worker, what would be the necessary conditions to replicate this personality and to reward the stronger while disciplining the weaker. In his 1946 paper entitled "Frontiers of Social Psychiatry", he used the case of World War II Germany as an example where society poisoned the minds of citizens by creating a general anxiety or neurosis.

== Cameron and Freud: civilization and discontents ==
Although Cameron rejected the Freudian notion of the unconscious, he shared the Freudian idea that personal psychology is linked to the nervous nature. He theorized that attitudes and beliefs should reinforce the overall attitudes of the desired society. Like Freud, Cameron maintained that the family was the nucleus of social behavior and anxieties later in life were spawned during childhood. Cameron wanted to build an inventive psychiatric institution to determine rapid ways for societal control while demanding a psychological economy that did not center itself around guilt and guilt complexes. His focus on children included the rights to protection against outmoded, doctrinaire tactics, and the necessity for the implantation of taboos and inhibitions from their parents. Cameron wrote that mental illness was transmitted generationally; thus, the re-occurrence of mental illness could be stopped by remodeling and expanding existing concepts of marriage suitability, as well as the quarantine of mentally ill individuals from the general population. The only cure for mental illness, he theorized, was to eliminate its "carriers" from society altogether.

Cameron believed that mental illness was literally contagious – that if one came into contact with someone with mental illness, one would begin to produce the symptoms of a mental disease. For example, something like rock music could be created by mentally ill people and would produce mentally ill people through infection, which in turn would be transmitted to the genes. Thus, this group would have to be studied and controlled as a contagious social disease. Police, hospitals, government, and schools would need to use the correct psychiatric authority to stop mental contagions from spreading. Cameron also hoped to generate families capable of using authority and techniques to take measures against mental illness, which would later be apparent in Cameron's MKULTRA and MKDELTA experiments.

== Cameron and the Germans ==
If we can succeed in inventing means of changing their attitudes and beliefs, we shall find ourselves in possession of measures which, if wisely used, may be employed in freeing ourselves from their attitudes and beliefs in other fields which have greatly contributed to the instability of our period by their propensity for holding up progress

— Cameron on the Germans, in Life is For Living

In Cameron's book Life is For Living, published in 1948, he expressed a concern for the German race in general. Just as Sigrid Schultz stated in Germany will try it again, Cameron fostered a fear for Germans and their genetic determination. Those Germans affected by the events that led to World War II were of utmost concern. Cameron's concerns extended to his policies determining who should have children and advance to positions of authority. According to Cameron's psychiatric analysis of the German people, they were not suitable to have children or hold positions of authority because of a genetic tendency to organize society in a way that fostered fearsome aggression and would lead to war rather than peace; he would repeatedly use the German as the archetypal character structure on which to ground the most psychologically deviant humans.

== Mental illness as a social contagion ==
Although society had established sanctions against the spread of infectious diseases, Cameron wanted to extend the concept of contagion to chronic anxiety. He argued that people with mental illnesses could spread and transmit their diseases. He warned that government institutions should take measures against such potential liabilities. Cameron began to base some of his notions on race, as is seen in his theories regarding the German people.

In the late 1940s, Cameron presented his ideas in a lecture entitled Dangerous Men and Women. It describes various personalities that he believed were of marked danger to all members of society. The personality types are as follows:

- A passive man who "is afraid to say what he really thinks" and "will stand anything, and stands for nothing". "[H]e was born in Munich, he is the eternal compromiser and his spiritual food is appeasement".
- A possessive type, filled with jealousy and demanding utmost loyalty. This personality type poses a danger to those closest to them, especially children.
- The insecure man – "They are the driven crowds that makes the army of the authoritarian overlord; they are the stuffing of conservatism ... mediocrity is their god. They fear the stranger, they fear the new idea; they are afraid to live, and scared to die." This third type needs conformity and obeys the dictates of society, adhering to a world of strict standards of right or wrong (which are manipulated by power groups to keep the insecure controlled and dependent). Cameron theorized that this type is dangerous because of its "lust for authority".
- The last type is the psychopath, the greatest danger in times of political and societal upheaval; this Cameron labeled "the Gestapo".

Cameron believed that a society in which psychiatry built and developed the institutions of government, schools, prisons and hospitals would be one in which science triumphed over the "sick" members of society. He demanded that political systems be watched, and that German people needed to be monitored due to their "personality type", which he claimed results in the conditions that give rise to the dictatorial power of an authoritarian overlord.

Cameron stated, "Get it understood how dangerous these damaged, sick personalities are to ourselves – and above all, to our children, whose traits are taking form and we shall find ways to put an end to them." He spoke about Germans, but also to the larger portion of the society that resembled or associated with such traits. For Cameron, the traits were contagions and anyone affected by the societal, cultural or personality forms would themselves be infected. Cameron used his ideas to implement policies on who should govern and parent in society. The described types would have to be eliminated from society if there was to be peace and progress. The sick were, for Cameron, the viral infection to its stability and health. The described types were the enemies of society and life. Experts must develop methods of forcefully changing attitudes and beliefs to prevent the authoritarian overlord.

== MKULTRA Subproject 68 ==
During the 1950s and 1960s, Cameron's work attracted the interest of the Central Intelligence Agency's MKUltra mind control program, which began funding his work under MKUltra subproject 68. He is unrelated to another CIA psychiatrist, Alan S. Cameron, who helped pioneer psychological profiling of world leaders during the 1970s and was not associated with the behavioral modification research program.

Cameron had hoped to correct schizophrenia by "erasing" existing memories and "reprogramming" the psyche through a process he called "depatterning", along with other experimental methods. He commuted from Lake Placid, New York to Montreal every week to work at McGill University's Allan Memorial Institute and was paid $69,000 from 1957 to 1964 to carry out MKUltra experiments there, known as the Montreal experiments. In addition to LSD, he experimented with various paralytic drugs such as curare and electroconvulsive therapy at thirty to forty times the normal power. His "psychic driving" experiments consisted of putting a subject into a drug-induced coma for weeks at a time (up to three months in one case) while playing tape loops of noise or simple statements. These experiments were typically carried out on patients who had entered the Institute for minor problems such as anxiety disorders and postnatal depression; many were permanently debilitated after these treatments. Such consequences included incontinence, amnesia, forgetting how to talk, forgetting their parents, and thinking their interrogators were their parents. His work was inspired and paralleled by the psychiatrist William Sargant, who was also involved with the intelligence services (though not with MKULTRA) and experimented extensively on his patients without their consent, causing similar long-term damage.

Sid Taylor stated that Cameron used curare to immobilise his patients during his research. After one test he noted: "Although the patient was prepared by both prolonged sensory isolation (35 days) and by repeated depatterning, and although she received 101 days of positive driving, no favourable results were obtained." Patients were tested in the Radio Telemetry Laboratory, which was built under Cameron's direction. Here, patients were exposed to a range of RF and electromagnetic signals and monitored for changes in behaviour. It was reported that none of the patients sent to the Radio Telemetry Lab showed any signs of improvement.

In 1980, the Canadian investigative news program The Fifth Estate interviewed two former patients of Cameron's who were among several of his ex patients who were at that time suing the CIA for the long term effects of Cameron's treatment. In her book, In the Sleep Room: The Story of the CIA Brainwashing Experiments in Canada, author Anne Collins explored the history of Cameron and Montreal's Allan Memorial Institute. This was made into a TV mini-series directed by Anne Wheeler in 1998, called The Sleep Room, which also dramatizes the lawsuit of Cameron's ex-patients against the CIA. The son of one of Cameron's patients noted in a memoir that other than Ed Broadbent and Svend Robinson, no Canadian MP brought up the issue in the House of Parliament.

Naomi Klein states in her book The Shock Doctrine that Cameron's research and his contribution to MKUltra were not about mind control and brainwashing, but "to design a scientifically based system for extracting information from 'resistant sources.' In other words, torture." She then cites Alfred W. McCoy: "Stripped of its bizarre excesses, Cameron's experiments, building upon Donald O. Hebb's earlier breakthrough, laid the scientific foundation for the CIA's two-stage psychological torture method."

Cameron is the subject of Stephen Bennett's film Eminent Monsters (2020), which was funded by BBC Scotland and Creative Scotland.

Whether or not Cameron was aware that funding for his experiments was coming from the CIA is unclear; it has been argued that he would have carried out the exact same experiments if funding had come from a source without ulterior motives.

== Death ==
Cameron died of a heart attack while hiking with his son in the Adirondack Mountains on September 8, 1967.

== See also ==
- Andrei Snezhnevsky
- Aziz al-Abub, a torture expert affiliated with Hezbollah who studied and replicated some of Cameron's torture techniques
- Sidney Gottlieb
