= Masala (1991 film) =

- Directed by: Srinivas Krishna
- Written by: Srinivas Krishna
- Produced by: Camelia Frieberg; Srinivas Krishna
- Starring: Srinivas Krishna; Zohra Sehgal; Saeed Jaffrey; Sakina Jaffrey; Madhuri Bhatia
- Cinematography: Paul Sarossy
- Edited by: Mike Munn
- Music by: Leslie Winston
- Production company: Divani Films
- Release date: September 22, 1991 (Cinéfest)
- Running time: 106 minutes
- Country: Canada
- Language: English

Masala is a 1991 Canadian drama film starring, written, and directed by Srinivas Krishna.

== Plot ==
Krishna is an orphan in Toronto whose parents and siblings were killed several years earlier in the Air India Flight 182 explosion while travelling back to India for a family visit, and who is now cleaning up his act after several years living on the streets as a drug addict and criminal.

The film also stars Zohra Sehgal as his grandmother; Saeed Jaffrey in a triple role as his uncle Lallu, a postal worker named Hariprasad and the Hindu god Krishna; and Sakina Jaffrey as Rita, Hariprasad's daughter.

== Distribution ==
The film premiered at the 1991 Toronto International Film Festival.

== Response ==
The film has been described as drawing on some the cinematic traditions of Bollywood rather than relying solely on the social realist conventions of Canadian film.

It has come to be recognized, alongside Deepa Mehta's contemporaneous Sam & Me, as being the first major landmark films about the Indo-Canadian experience.

== Accolades ==
The film received the Samuelson Award at the Birmingham International Film and Television Festival in 1991, and Saeed Jaffrey received a Genie Award nomination for Best Actor at the 12th Genie Awards.

== Digital release ==
In 2023, Telefilm Canada announced that the film was one of 23 titles that will be digitally restored under its new Canadian Cinema Reignited program to preserve classic Canadian films.

The restored version screened in the Classics program at the 2024 Toronto International Film Festival.
