= Canadian Film Institute =

Non-profit organization in Canada

- Abbreviation: CFI
- Formation: 1935
- Type: Film organization based in Canada
- Legal status: Active
- Purpose: Advocate and public voice, educator and network
- Headquarters: Ottawa, Ontario, Canada
- Region served: Canada
- Official language: English, French
- Executive Director: Tom McSorley
- Affiliations: Ottawa International Animation Festival.
- Website: www.cfi-icf.ca

The Canadian Film Institute (CFI) (French: Institut canadien du film (ICF)) involves Canada in the film production, study, appreciation process of film/moving images for cultural and educational purposes. The Canadian Film Institute organizes ongoing public film programming and artist talks, provides educational enhancements on its websites, distributes a small collection of films, and is involved in the publication of books and monographs on various aspects of Canadian cinema. CFI screenings and events are held in Ottawa Ontario, mainly at The Auditorium at 395 Wellington St. (formerly operated by Library and Archives Canada).

== History ==
The Canadian Film Institute (CFI) was incorporated in 1935 as a federally chartered, non-governmental, non-profit cultural organization. It is the oldest film institution in Canada and the second oldest film institute in the world. The Institute presents a regular public programme of contemporary, historical, and international cinema in the National Capital Region, presented in the Auditorium of the Library and Archives Canada. It also curates and circulates a number of its film series to various cinémathèques in other cities across Canada.

In the late 1960s and afterwards, it operated regular archives film screenings under the name National Film Theatre / Répertoire canadien du cinéma in Ottawa, and Toronto at Radio City Hall.

== Café Ex ==
Inaugurated in 1998, this on-going visiting artist series presents artist-curated evenings of independent experimental film and video in the intimate atmosphere of Club SAW. The series features Canadian experimental cinema, with guest filmmakers presenting their work and engaging in extensive discussions with audience members for a "pay-what-you-can" admission.

Presenting artists have included: Clint Enns and Leslie Supnet (Toronto) (2014) Theodore Ushev (Montreal) (2014) Monique Moumblow (Montreal) (2013) Bridget Farr (Ottawa) (2013) Phillip Hoffman (Toronto) (2013) Roger Wilson (Ottawa) (2012) Malcolm Sutherland (Montreal) (2012) Francisca Duran (Toronto) (2012) Tony Asimakopoulos (Montreal) (2011) Heidi Phillips (Winnipeg) (2011) Louise Bourque (Edmundston) (2011) Donigan Cumming (Montreal) (2011) Chris Gehman (Toronto) (2010) Penny McCann (Ottawa) (2010) Cecilia Araneda (Winnipeg) (2010) Chris Kennedy (Toronto) (2010)

== Francophone Cinema ==
Films from across the French-speaking world are come to Ottawa for DiverCiné – les écrans de la Francophonie du monde film festival from March 8 to March 17, 2013, for its 11th annual run. Organized by the Embassy of France to Canada and the Department of Canadian Heritage, in partnership with the Canadian Film Institute. DiverCiné is a cultural event that supports and promotes Francophone Canadian and Francophone World Film films, short films, artist and cultural discussions, in its Ottawa Location. DiverCiné gives Canadian audiences an opportunity to see first-rate movies created by filmmakers from a variety of the world's French-speaking countries that are rarely screened in Canada. DiverCiné strives to showcase Francophone World Cinema that explore the diverse culture and contemporary issues of the Francophone World, with the help of its media partners, TV5 and Radio-Canada. It is an opportunity to feature Talent and films from Canada and the rest of the francophone world. The majority of the films at the Diverciné festival include English subtitles and include family friendly screenings.

== Film festivals ==
The Canadian Film Institute also organizes and stages various film festivals throughout the year, most notably the International Film Festival of Ottawa and the Ottawa International Animation Festival.

In collaboration with embassies or non-profit community organizations, the institute also organizes a number of specialist film festivals devoted to international films from various world countries or regions, including the European Union Film Festival, the Latin American Film Festival, the Israeli Film Festival, the India Film Festival, Bright Nights: The Baltic-Nordic Film Festival, the German Language Film Festival, Festival Japan, and the Portuguese Language Film Festival.

The Portuguese Language Film Festival, in collaboration with the Embassies of Angola, Brazil, Mozambique and Portugal, premiered in the celebration of the Language Day of CPLP (Community of Portuguese Language Countries), May 5, 2012, and will be part of the Canadian Film Institute annual events.

== Online Publications ==
Canadian Film Institute provides Canadian Publications: in-depth analyses, essays, discussions, interviews, of respected Canadian filmmakers, writers. The CFI will release online publications of previously released CFI paperbacks for free access for Canadian Cinema Supporters and an international audience to enjoy. The Canadian Film Institute has already released one online publication, with five more on the way to make a total of a Six-book series by the end of 2013.

Rivers of Time: The Films of Philip Hoffman, Edited by Tom McSorley, Published by the Canadian Film Institute, 2008.

Contributors: Scott Birdwise, Rick Hancox, Mike Hoolboom, André Loiselle, Penny McCann, Tom McSorley, James Missen, Chris Robinson, Christopher Rohde

The book is provided online at The Canadian Film Institute official website.

== Sponsors ==
- Canadian Council for the arts
- Viva Urban
- Novotel Hotels
- Ottawa Kiosk
- Ontario Arts Council
- DIFFUSART.BIZ
