= Sam & Me =

- Theatrical release poster
- Directed by: Deepa Mehta
- Written by: Ranjit Chowdhry
- Produced by: Deepa Mehta; Robert Wertheimer
- Starring: Ranjit Chowdhry; Peter Boretski; Om Puri
- Cinematography: Guy Dufaux
- Edited by: Boyd Bonitzke
- Music by: Mark Korven
- Distributed by: ITC Entertainment
- Release dates: May 1991 (Cannes Critics' Week); September 19, 1991 (Cinefest Sudbury International Film Festival)
- Running time: 94 minutes
- Country: Canada
- Languages: English; Hindi

Sam & Me is a 1991 Indo-Canadian drama film directed by Deepa Mehta (in her directorial debut) and written by Ranjit Chowdhry, who also stars in the film with Peter Boretski and Om Puri. The film went on to win an honourable mention at the Cannes Film Festival.

== Plot ==
23-year-old Nikhil, an Indian immigrant, has just arrived to Canada looking forward to working with his uncle at a hospital-supply business. Nikhil is begrudgingly convinced by his uncle to also be a caregiver and companion to Sam Cohen, an elderly, cantankerous Jewish man. Sam does not get along with his adult son Morris, who owns the business Nikhil works for. As an unlikely friendship forms between Nikhil and Sam, both men gain new insight into life.

== Cast ==
- Ranjit Chowdhry as Nikhil "Shwartza" Parikh
- Peter Boretski as Sam "Zayda" Cohen
- Om Puri as Chetan Parikh
- Heath Lamberts as Morris Cohen
- Kulbhushan Kharbanda as Baldev
- Javed Jaffrey as Xavier

== Production ==
On her inspiration for the film, Deepa Mehta said, "I was a Canadian who still thought of herself as an Indian. My home was Delhi, yet my daughter was in Toronto, as was my home with my then-husband. It was a confusing period in my life. As an immigrant, why was I still nostalgic for my homeland? How and when does one transfer their allegiance to another country? While I had luckily not experienced any overt racism, I could feel it brimming under the polite Canadian surface…it made perfect sense for me to do a film about Indian immigrants to Canada and their hopes, desires, and tribulations."

== Release ==
The film broke the record for the highest-budgeted film directed by a woman in Canada. At the 1991 Cannes Film Festival, it won an honourable mention for the Caméra d'Or prize.

== Reception ==
Rick Groen wrote in The Globe and Mail: "In her feature debut, director Deepa Mehta has made one of those fascinating, frustrating films where the sub-plot outshines the plot, where everything on the periphery of the frame is infinitely better than the nominal focal point. Because there, at the edges, we're treated to ethnic humour worthy of the label -- well-observed moments that explode some stereotypes and confirm others, moments that are wry and sharp and poignant."

Academic Kass Banning wrote, "Signifying the promise and the perils of cross-cultural dialogue, Sam and Me both validates and negates the multiculturalist utopian myth of interethnic cooperation."

The film has come to be recognized, alongside Srinivas Krishna's contemporaneous Masala, as being the first major landmark films about the Indo-Canadian experience.

== Home media ==
In 2018, the film was released online for free on Canada Media Fund's Encore+ YouTube channel.
