= Aziz al-Abub =

Lebanese psychiatrist

Aziz al-Abub (also known as Ibrahim al-Nadhir or al-Nahdhir) was a Lebanese psychiatrist and medical torture expert affiliated with Hezbollah. Al-Abub is accused of having used brainwashing, drugs, and physical torture on Central Intelligence Agency (CIA) operatives in Beirut, in particular, the torture of CIA station chief William Francis Buckley.

== See also ==
- Prison 209
- Markus Wolf
