= John Pozer =

Canadian film director, screenwriter, producer and editor

John Pozer is a Canadian film director, screenwriter, producer and editor. He has had two independent films chosen for the Cannes International Film Festival and has directed a number of live action and animated television episodes.

== Biography ==
Pozer began his career in the 1960s as a stage actor, touring in musical theatre productions such as Camelot, The King and I, The Sound of Music, and starring in the title roles of Oliver and Peter Pan. He went on to star as Jim Hawkins in Treasure Island, which opened the National Arts Centre in Ottawa. In 1970, Pozer was presented with the E.V. Young Memorial Award for Most Promising Actor.

Born in Kamloops, British Columbia, Pozer studied filmmaking and creative writing at the University of British Columbia and graduated with a Masters of Fine Arts in Cinema from Concordia University in Montreal. He received the UBC Film Society Award for his series of documentaries which profiled university life in the 1980s.

In 2010, Pozer became a Senior Directing Instructor for the Vancouver Film School and was acknowledged in 2012 for 'excellence in teaching' for his contribution to the film production program.

Pozer authored his first book, 21st Century Film Student PRIMER - Everything You Need to Know and Do Before You Go to Film School, which was released in 2019.

== Filmography ==
His first feature, The Grocer's Wife, which he wrote, directed, and produced, garnered international awards at festivals around the world. In 1992, it was selected to open the Critic's Week at the Cannes Film Festival, and went on to win the critics' award, the Prix Georges Sadoul, for Best First Film. In Canada, Pozer was awarded the inaugural Claude Jutra Award for Best Direction of a First Feature Film at the 1993 Genie Awards.

He next directed the dark comedy The Michelle Apartments, which premiered at the Toronto International Film Festival and was theatrically distributed by Cineplex Odeon.

Pozer also executive produced and edited the independent feature Kissed, which was selected for the Director's Fortnight at Cannes in 1997. The film earned eight Genie nominations and went on to critical and box-office success.

He has directed episodic television such as Disney's So Weird, CTV's Cold Squad, CBC's These Arms of Mine, Global’s Blackfly, Fox Family's animated Beast Wars, and MTV's 2ge+her. Pozer received a Leo Award for Best Director in May 2002 for his work on the MTV comedy series Sausage Factory.

In 2015, Pozer took on the role of executive producer for the feature film, After Eden, which was selected for the New Directors Competition at the San Sebastian International Film Festival.
