= Saeed Jaffrey =

British-Indian actor (1929–2015)

Saeed Jaffrey OBE
- Pronunciation: [sɐiːd̪ d͡ʒɑːfɾiː]
- Born: 8 January 1929; Malerkotla, Punjab, British India
- Died: 15 November 2015 (aged 86); London, England
- Resting place: Gunnersbury Cemetery
- Citizenship: British; Indian (formerly)
- Education: University of Allahabad (BA, MA); Catholic University of America (MFA)
- Occupation: Actor
- Years active: 1961–2011
- Works: Full list
- Spouses: Madhur Jaffrey (m. 1958; div. 1966) Jennifer Sorrell (m. 1980)
- Children: 3, including Sakina Jaffrey
- Relatives: Kiara Advani (grandniece)
- Honors: Order of the British Empire (1995); Padma Shri (2016; posthumously)

Saeed Jaffrey (Note: Hindustani pronunciation: [sɐiːd̪ d͡ʒɑːfɾiː].) (Hindustani pronunciation: [sɐiːd̪ d͡ʒɑːfɾiː]; 8 January 1929 – 15 November 2015) was a British-Indian actor. His career covered film, radio, stage and television roles over six decades and more than 150 British, American, and Indian movies. During the 1980s and 1990s, he was considered to be Britain's highest-profile Asian actor, thanks to his leading roles in the film My Beautiful Laundrette (1985) and television series The Jewel in the Crown (1984), Tandoori Nights (1985–1987) and Little Napoleons (1994). He played an instrumental part in bringing together filmmakers James Ivory and Ismail Merchant, and acted in several of their Merchant Ivory Productions films such as The Guru (1969), Hullabaloo Over Georgie and Bonnie's Pictures (1978), The Courtesans of Bombay (1983) and The Deceivers (1988).

Jaffrey broke into Indian films with Satyajit Ray's Shatranj Ke Khilari (1977) for which he won the Filmfare Best Supporting Actor Award in 1978. His cameo role as the paanwala Lallan Miyan in Chashme Buddoor (1981) won him popularity with Indian audiences. He became a household name in India with his roles in Raj Kapoor's Ram Teri Ganga Maili (1985) and Henna (1991), both of which won him nominations for the Filmfare Best Supporting Actor Award.

Jaffrey was the first Asian to receive British and Canadian film award nominations. In 1995 he was appointed an OBE in recognition of his services to drama. His memoirs, Saeed: An Actor's Journey, were published in 1998. He died at a hospital in London on 15 November 2015, after collapsing from a brain haemorrhage at his home. He was posthumously given the Padma Shri award in January 2016.

== Early life and education ==
Saeed Jaffrey was born on 8 January, 1929 to a Punjabi Muslim family in Malerkotla in the Punjab Province of British India (now in Punjab, India). At that time, his maternal grandfather, Khan Bahadur Fazle Imam of Banur, was the Dewan or Prime Minister of the princely state of Malerkotla. His father, Dr Hamid Hussain Jaffrey, was a physician and a civil servant with the Health Services department of the United Provinces of Agra and Oudh in colonial India. Hamid's wife and the mother of Saeed Jaffrey was Hamida Begum. Jaffrey had two brothers, Waheed and Hameed, and a sister, Shagufta.

Jaffrey and his family moved from one medical posting to another within the United Provinces, living in cities like Muzaffarnagar, Lucknow, Mirzapur, Kanpur, Aligarh, Mussoorie, Gorakhpur and Jhansi. His father was a doctor in government service who was posted in many rural areas across the United Provinces and the family invariably moved with him. At the time of his birth, Jaffrey's maternal grandfather was the diwan (first minister) of Malerkotla State.

In 1938, Jaffrey joined Minto Circle School at Aligarh Muslim University where he developed his talent for mimicry. In 1939 he played the role of Dara Shikoh in a school play about Aurangzeb. At Aligarh, Jaffrey also mastered the Urdu language and attended riding school. At the local cinemas in Aligarh, he saw many Bollywood movies and became a fan of Motilal, Prithviraj Kapoor, Noor Mohammed Charlie, Fearless Nadia, Kanan Bala and Durga Khote.

In 1941 at Mussoorie, Jaffrey attended Wynberg Allen School, a Church of England public school, where he picked up British-accented English. He played the role of the Cockney cook, Mason, in the annual school play, R. C. Sherriff's Journey's End. After completing his Senior Cambridge there, Jaffrey attended St. George's College, Mussoorie, an all-boys' Roman Catholic school run by Brothers of Saint Patrick. He played the role of Kate Hardcastle in the annual school play, Oliver Goldsmith's She Stoops To Conquer. At Mussoorie, Jaffrey and his brother Waheed would often sneak out at night to watch British and American films at the local theatres.

In 1945, Jaffrey gained admission to Allahabad University where he completed his BA in English literature in 1948 and MA in medieval Indian literature in 1950. At Allahabad, Jaffrey learned about Hindu religion and mythology for the first time. While visiting his father in Gorakhpur in the winter of 1945, Jaffrey discovered the BBC World Service on the shortwave radio. When India gained independence from Britain on 15 August 1947 Jaffrey heard Jawaharlal Nehru's inaugural speech on All India Radio as the Prime Minister of India, titled "Tryst with Destiny". The partition of India caused all of Jaffrey's relatives in New Delhi and Bannoor, Punjab, to migrate to Pakistan.

Jaffrey was awarded his MFA in drama from the Catholic University of America in 1957.

== Career ==
=== New Delhi (1951–1956) ===
In February 1951, Jaffrey travelled to New Delhi to try his luck as a cartoonist, writer or broadcaster. He successfully auditioned as an announcer at All India Radio. He started his radio career as an English Announcer with the External Services of All India Radio on 2 April 1951 for a salary of ₹250 / month. Unable to afford a place to stay and having no relatives in the city, Jaffrey spent his nights on the bench behind the office building. Mehra Masani, the station director, eventually arranged for him to share a room at the YMCA for ₹30 / month. Jaffrey bought a Raleigh bicycle for the commute.

Along with Frank Thakurdas and "Benji" Benegal, Jaffrey set up the Unity Theatre, an English-language repertory company at New Delhi in 1951. The first production was of Jean Cocteau's play The Eagle Has Two Heads, with Madhur Bahadur playing the role of the Queen's Reader opposite Saeed as Azrael. Unity Theatre subsequently staged J. B. Priestley's Dangerous Corner, Dylan Thomas' Under Milk Wood, Molière's The Bourgeois Gentleman, Christopher Fry's The Firstborn and T. S. Eliot's The Cocktail Party .

After graduation from Miranda House in 1953, Bahadur joined All India Radio. She worked as a disc jockey at night. Jaffrey and Bahadur, having fallen "madly in love", dated at Gaylord, a restaurant in Connaught Place. At Unity Theatre, Bahadur and Jaffrey acted together in Christopher Fry's A Phoenix Too Frequent, followed by Oscar Wilde's The Importance of Being Earnest, Tennessee Williams' Auto-da-Fé, and William Shakespeare's Othello.

In early 1955, Bahadur left to study drama formally at the Royal Academy of Dramatic Art (RADA), a drama school in the UK. In late 1955, Jaffrey won a Fulbright scholarship to study drama in America the following year. In spring 1956, he approached Bahadur's parents in Delhi for her hand in marriage but they refused because they felt that his financial prospects as an actor did not appear sound. In summer 1956, Jaffrey resigned from his position as Radio Director at All India Radio. He flew to London on his way to America and proposed to Bahadur. She refused but gave him a tour of RADA where she pointed out a young Peter O'Toole and other English stage actors who would later achieve prominence. A few days later, Jaffrey boarded the RMS Queen Elizabeth to sail across the Atlantic Ocean from Southampton to New York City.

=== New York (1958–1965) ===
In 1957, Jaffrey graduated from the Catholic University of America's Department of Speech and Drama and was selected to act in summer stock plays at St. Michael's Playhouse in Winooski, Vermont. Jaffrey arranged for Bahadur to join him there after she graduated from RADA. He played the lead in three of the plays put on by St. Michael's Playhouse: Sakini, the Okinawan interpreter in The Teahouse of the August Moon; barrister Sir Wilfred Robarts in Agatha Christie's Witness for the Prosecution; and Voice of God, with Gino, in The Little World of Don Camillo.

In September 1957, Bahadur and Jaffrey returned to Washington, D.C. where Jaffrey rehearsed for the 1957 – 58 season with the National Players, a professional touring company that performed classical plays all over America. He was the first Indian to take Shakespearean plays on a tour of the United States. He was cast in the role of Friar Laurence in Romeo and Juliet. He played Gremio in The Taming of the Shrew. Midway through the tour, Jaffrey returned to Washington DC from Miami to marry Bahadur in a modest civil ceremony. The next day, they travelled to New York City where Bahadur was taken on as a tour guide at the United Nations while Jaffrey undertook public relations work for the Government of India Tourist Office. They lived on West 27th Street, between Sixth and Broadway. Between 1959 and 1962 Bahadur and Jaffrey had three daughters, Meera, Zia and Sakina.

In 1958, Jaffrey joined Lee Strasberg's Actors Studio and played the lead in an Off-Broadway production of Federico García Lorca's Blood Wedding. At this time, he met Ismail Merchant who had recently arrived from Bombay to attend the New York University Stern School of Business. Merchant approached Jaffrey with a proposal to put on a Broadway production of The Little Clay Cart starring the Jaffreys. Jaffrey took him home for dinner, where he met Madhur for the first time. In 1959, James Ivory, then a budding filmmaker from California, approached Jaffrey to provide the narration for his short film about Indian miniature painting, The Sword and the Flute (1959). Jaffrey provided the narration for Ismail Merchant's Oscar-nominated short film, The Creation of Woman (1960). The same year, he appeared in a limited run off-Broadway production of Twelfth Night at the Equity Library Theatre in the role of sea captain Antonio.

In 1961, when The Sword and the Flute was shown in New York City, the Jaffreys encouraged Ismail Merchant to attend the screening, where he met Ivory for the first time. They subsequently met regularly at the Jaffreys' dinners and cemented their relationship into a lifetime partnership, both personal and professional. The Jaffreys planned to go back to India, start a travelling company and tour with it. They would often discuss this idea with James Ivory and started writing a script in his brownstone on East 64th Street.

In 1961, Jaffrey was forced to give up his job as Publicity Officer with the Government of India Tourist Office. He went back to radio and joined The New York Times Company's radio station WQXR-FM, where his first broadcast programme was Reflections of India with Saeed Jaffrey. Jaffrey also took up acting on stage. The pay for such roles was generally $10/hour.

Within a year of Jaffrey's joining the Actors Studio in 1958, he was able to get Madhur admitted there too. However, they left by 1962 because they felt the criticism offered by Lee Strasberg was too much for their sensitivity. He played the role of the Wigmaker in a three-week run of a theatre version of Akira Kurosawa's Rashomon at Fort Lee Playhouse in New Jersey. He appeared briefly in Rabindranath Tagore's The King of the Dark Chamber along with Madhur. From January to May 1962, Jaffrey appeared at Broadway's Ambassador Theatre in a stage adaption of E. M. Forster's novel A Passage to India in the role of Professor Godbole. In November 1962 Madhur and Saeed appeared in Rolf Forsberg's Off-Broadway production of A Tenth of an Inch Makes The Difference. Their performance was described by The New York Times drama critic, Milton Esterow, as "sensitive acting" that made up "the brightest part of the evening".

In 1963, Jaffrey toured with Lotte Lenya and the American National Theater and Academy to perform Brecht on Brecht, a revue which was seen in Boston, Chicago, Milwaukee and Detroit. In summer 1964, Jaffrey along with some actor friends, created a multi-racial touring company called Theater In The Street, giving free performances of Molière's The Doctor Despite Himself in Harlem, Brooklyn and Bedford–Stuyvesant.

By 1964, the Jaffreys' marriage had collapsed. Madhur arranged for their children to live with her parents and sister in Delhi while she went to Mexico for the formal divorce proceedings. The divorce was finalized in 1966.

=== London (1965–2000) ===
In 1965, Jaffrey was offered the role of Brahma in Kindly Monkeys at the Arts Theatre, London. Favourable reviews of the play brought an offer from the BBC World Service to write, act and narrate scripts in Urdu and Hindi. Jaffrey played the small part of barrister Hamidullah in the BBC Television adaptation of A Passage to India. In order to pay the rent on his one-bedroom flat in Chelsea, Jaffrey took a job as an assistant cashier at Liberty's, a department store selling luxury goods.

In early 1966, Jaffrey returned to New York City to play the haiku-karate expert Korean police chief Kim Bong Choy in Nathan Weinstein, Mystic, Connecticut that opened on Broadway at the Brooks Atkinson Theatre. In summer that year he played a role in The Coffee Lover, a comedy starring Alexis Smith that toured Massachusetts, Connecticut and Maine. Later that year, he recorded a narration of the Kama Sutra titled The Art of Love for Vanguard Records. It was listed by Time magazine in February 1967 as "one of the five best spoken word records ever made".

Back in London, Jaffrey was given the opportunity to shoot in India for the next Merchant Ivory film, The Guru (1969). He flew to Bombay in December 1967 and met his daughters after a gap of three years. He returned to London in the summer of 1968. He became the first Indian in a starring role in London's West End theatre when he played a Pakistani photographer in On A Foggy Day. In 1975 he appeared as Billy Fish in John Huston's classic film The Man Who Would Be King.

In the 1980s, Jaffrey won substantial roles on British television in colonial dramas The Jewel in the Crown and The Far Pavilions plus the British Indian sitcom Tandoori Nights, Little Napoleons (1994) and the ITV soap Coronation Street.

He was the subject of This Is Your Life in 2001 when he was surprised by Michael Aspel during the curtain call of the musical The King and I at the London Palladium.

== Personal life ==
Jaffrey's first wife, Madhur Bahadur, who took his name, came from an old and affluent Hindu Kayastha family of Old Delhi. She is a well-known character actress who appeared in a number of Indian and British films, and had a successful career as a food and travel television personality. Jaffrey and Bahadur were married in Washington, D.C. in September 1958 and divorced in Mexico in 1966. They had three daughters: Zia, Meera and Sakina Jaffrey. The latter made her acting debut alongside her mother in Merchant-Ivory's film The Perfect Murder. After the divorce, the children were sent to India, to be cared for by Bahadur's parents and sister in Delhi. Bahadur married Sanford Allen in 1969, an American classical violinist, but she remained professionally known by her first husband's name.

In 1980, Jaffrey married Jennifer Sorrell, an agent and freelance casting director. Jaffrey converted to Christianity and attended Sunday service with his wife at St Mary's Church in South Ealing, where his funeral took place.

In 1998, Jaffrey published his autobiography, Saeed: An Actor's Journey.

== Death ==
Jaffrey died in the early hours of 14 November 2015 at a London hospital. He was 86 years old. He had collapsed at his London residence from a brain haemorrhage, and never regained consciousness. His funeral was held in London on 7 December.

== Filmography ==
Jaffrey appeared in many Bollywood and Hollywood movies, and appeared with actors including Sean Connery, Michael Caine and Pierce Brosnan. He starred in films directed by Satyajit Ray, James Ivory, Richard Attenborough, and John Huston.

His film credits include The Wilby Conspiracy (1975), The Man Who Would Be King (1975), Shatranj Ke Khiladi (The Chess Players) (1977), Sphinx (1981), as Sardar Patel in Gandhi (1982), A Passage to India (1965 BBC version and 1984 film), The Far Pavilions (1984), The Razor's Edge (1984), and My Beautiful Laundrette (1985).

He also appeared in many Bollywood films in the 1980s and 1990s. For television he starred in The Protectors (1973), The Persuaders!, Two's Company, Gangsters (1975–1978), The Jewel in the Crown (1984), Tandoori Nights (1985–1987), and Little Napoleons (1994). He also appeared as Ravi Desai on Coronation Street and in Minder as Mr Mukerjee in Series 1 episode The Bengal Tiger.

== Awards and nominations ==
Civilian Award

- 2016 – Padma Shri – India's fourth highest civilian honour from the Government of India (Posthumously)

Film Awards

Year	Award	Film	Category	Result
1986	BAFTA Awards	My Beautiful Laundrette	Best Actor in a Supporting Role	Nominated
1979	Filmfare Awards	Shatranj Ke Khilari	Best Supporting Actor	Won
1982	Filmfare Awards	Chashme Buddoor	Best Supporting Actor	Nominated
1986	Filmfare Awards	Ram Teri Ganga Maili	Best Supporting Actor	Nominated
1992	Filmfare Awards	Henna	Best Supporting Actor	Nominated
1991	Genie Awards	Masala	Best Actor	Nominated
