= Allan Memorial Institute =

Mental health hospital in Montreal, Canada

Allan Memorial Institute Institut Allan Memorial
- McGill University Health Centre
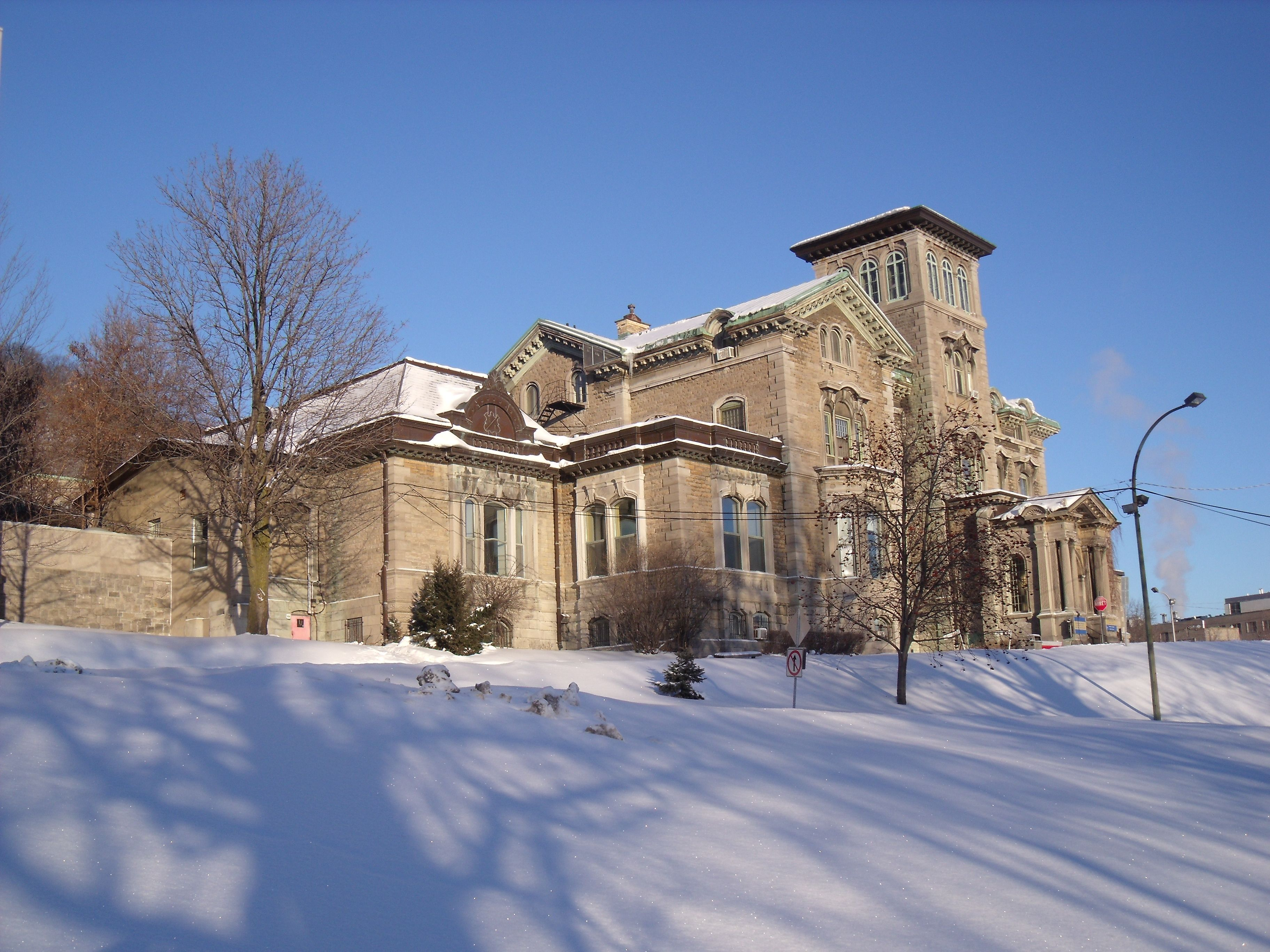

- Location in Montreal

Geography
- Location: Montreal, Quebec, Canada
- Coordinates: 45.5059°N 73.5821°W

Organization
- Care system: RAMQ (Quebec medicare)
- Type: Teaching
- Affiliated university: McGill University Faculty of Medicine
- Network: McGill University Health Centre

Services
- Speciality: Psychiatry

History
- Founded: 1943
- Closed: 1 May 2015 (as a hospital)

Links
- Lists: Hospitals in Canada

The Allan Memorial Institute (AMI; French: Institut Allan Memorial), also known colloquially as "the Allan", is a former psychiatric hospital and research institute located at 1025 Pine Avenue West in Montreal, Canada.

The Allan Memorial Institute is affiliated with McGill University and the Royal Victoria Hospital. Opened in 1943, it became internationally known for its psychiatric research programs and clinical services. During the 1950s and 1960s, it was directed by the psychiatrist Donald Ewen Cameron, under whose leadership controversial experimental treatments were conducted. Some of this research received covert funding through the Central Intelligence Agency's Project MKUltra, a Cold War program investigating behavioural modification and interrogation resistance.

Cameron's methods included intensive electroconvulsive therapy, prolonged drug-induced sleep, sensory deprivation, and repetitive audio conditioning techniques intended to alter behavioural patterns. Many former patients later reported long-term cognitive and psychological harm. Subsequent investigations and lawsuits in the late 20th century brought public attention to these practices, contributing to reforms in research ethics, informed consent standards, and oversight of human experimentation.

== History ==
The Allan Memorial Institute opened in 1943 as a psychiatric hospital and research facility, serving as a centre for teaching, clinical care, and psychiatric research.

=== Directorship of Donald Ewen Cameron ===
From 1943 to 1965, the psychiatrist Donald Ewen Cameron directed the institute. He was a prominent figure in psychiatry, and during his tenure, the hospital became internationally recognized for experimental research into biological psychiatry, personality, and behavioural modification.

Cameron's methods included intensive electroconvulsive therapy, prolonged drug-induced sleep, sensory deprivation, and repetitive audio conditioning techniques sometimes referred to as "psychic driving". These approaches were intended to alter maladaptive behavioural patterns and treat mental illness.

=== Project MKUltra involvement ===
Between the late 1950s and early 1960s, some research at the institute received covert funding from the Central Intelligence Agency as part of Project MKUltra, a program investigating mind control and behavioural manipulation during the Cold War.

Many former patients later reported they had not been fully informed about the nature or risks of the treatments. Some individuals experienced long-term cognitive impairment, memory loss, and psychological trauma. Public disclosure in the 1970s prompted investigations and legal claims.

== Legacy and continued use ==
The controversies surrounding the institute contributed to reforms in research ethics, informed consent standards, and oversight of human experimentation. The Allan Memorial Institute remains historically associated with debates over psychiatric ethics, government-funded human research, and Cold War-era psychological experimentation.

Named in memory of Sir Hugh Allan, whose former mansion, Ravenscrag, it occupies, the building is situated on the slope of Mount Royal on the McGill University downtown campus, in what used to be known as the Golden Square Mile. Its use as a psychiatric hospital ceased in 2015, when a new, modern psychiatry department was opened at the Montreal General Hospital.

The institute's practices are discussed in the 1995 Adam Curtis documentary series The Living Dead.

== See also ==
- Douglas Mental Health University Institute
- William Sargant
