= 500 Days of Summer (soundtrack) =

2009 soundtrack album to 500 Days of Summer

Two soundtrack albums were released for the film (500) Days of Summer. The first of the two albums, titled 500 Days of Summer: Music from the Motion Picture, features various pop songs from the film, released through Sire Records on July 13, 2009. The second album, titled 500 Days of Summer: Score from the Motion Picture, features the original score composed by Mychael Danna and Rob Simonsen. It was released on August 3, 2009.

== 500 Days of Summer: Music from the Motion Picture ==
500 Days of Summer: Music from the Motion Picture

Soundtrack album by Various artists
- Released: July 13, 2009
- Genres: Indie rock, alternative rock, folk
- Length: 52:26 (standard); 58:17 (deluxe)
- Label: Sire Records

=== Track listing ===
500 Days of Summer: Music from the Motion Picture track listing
No.	Title	Writer(s)	Performer	Length
1.	"A Story of Boy Meets Girl"	Mychael Danna, Rob Simonsen	Richard McGonagle	1:35
2.	"Us"	Regina Spektor	Regina Spektor	4:49
3.	"There Is a Light That Never Goes Out"	Johnny Marr, Morrissey	The Smiths	4:03
4.	"Bad Kids"	Cole Alexander, Ian Brown, Jared Swilley, Joseph Bradley	Black Lips	2:08
5.	"Please, Please, Please Let Me Get What I Want"	Marr, Morrissey	The Smiths	1:52
6.	"There Goes the Fear"	James Goodwin, Andrew Williams, Jeremy Williams	Doves	6:56
7.	"You Make My Dreams"	Sara Allen, Daryl Hall, John Oates	Hall & Oates	3:05
8.	"Sweet Disposition"	Lorenzo Sillitto, Dougy Mandagi	The Temper Trap	3:53
9.	"Quelqu'un m'a dit"	Carla Bruni, Leos Carax	Carla Bruni	2:44
10.	"Mushaboom"	Feist	Feist	3:44
11.	"Hero"	Regina Spektor	Regina Spektor	3:31
12.	"Bookends"	Paul Simon	Simon & Garfunkel	1:20
13.	"Vagabond"	Myles Heskett, Chris Ross, Andrew Stockdale	Wolfmother	3:47
14.	"She's Got You High"	James Arguile, Niall Buckler, Oli Frost, Gareth Jennings, James New	Mumm-Ra	3:25
15.	"Here Comes Your Man" (Pixies cover)	Charles Thompson	Meaghan Smith	3:13
16.	"Please, Please, Please Let Me Get What I Want" (The Smiths cover)	Marr, Morrissey	She & Him	2:12
Total length:				52:26

500 Days of Summer: Music from the Motion Picture (Deluxe Edition) track listing
No.	Title	Writer(s)	Performer	Length
17.	"Here Comes Your Man" (Pixies cover)	Charles Thompson	Joseph Gordon-Levitt	0:57
18.	"Sugar Town" (Nancy Sinatra cover)	Lee Hazlewood	Zooey Deschanel	2:28
19.	"At Last" (Etta James cover)	Mack Gordon, Harry Warren	Kevin Michael	2:19
Total length:				58:17

=== Reception ===
Andrew Leahey of Allmusic rated the album three and a half stars out of five, saying "With music playing such an integral role in the story line, it's refreshing to see that the accompanying soundtrack does its job well, distilling the characters' record collections (not to mention the movie's quirky, nostalgic ambiance) into one eclectic track list." A review from Sputnikmusic called it as "a mandatory component to the movie for those who loved it" and "a worthwhile listen even for those who didn't". Jeniffer Cooke of PopMatters said that " The music isn’t just confined to the soundtrack — it colors the story to the point where it almost becomes another character in the script".

=== Charts ===
Chart (2009)	Position
Australian Albums (ARIA)	46
New Zealand Albums (RMNZ)	31
UK Compilation Albums (Official Charts)	21
UK Soundtrack Albums (OCC)	4
US Billboard 200	7
US Top Alternative Albums (Billboard)	7
US Top Rock Albums (Billboard)	11
US Soundtrack Albums (Billboard)	1

== 500 Days of Summer: Score from the Motion Picture ==
500 Days of Summer: Score from the Motion Picture

Film score by Mychael Danna and Rob Simonsen
- Released: August 3, 2009
- Genre: Film score
- Length: 35:06
- Label: Sire Records

Mychael Danna and Rob Simonsen chronology
Lakeview Terrace (2008)	500 Days of Summer: Score from the Motion Picture (2009)	The Time Traveler's Wife (2009)

=== Track listing ===
All tracks are written by Mychael Danna and Rob Simonsen.

500 Days of Summer: Score from the Motion Picture (Deluxe Edition) track listing
No.	Title	Length
1.	"Main Title"	1:35
2.	"Trouble"	0:47
3.	"Things Were Going So Well"	1:46
4.	"I Want to Get Her Back"	2:23
5.	"Anal Girl"	1:39
6.	"Friends"	2:14
7.	"Ikea"	0:57
8.	"After Dance"	0:56
9.	"Serious"	1:15
10.	"87"	1:32
11.	"Arm Drawing"	2:55
12.	"Nobody Can"	2:04
13.	"Art Gallery"	1:23
14.	"New Wave"	1:19
15.	"I Love Us"	2:40
16.	"Blind Date"	1:39
17.	"I'm Not Going"	1:21
18.	"Train Ride Home"	0:53
19.	"Sketching Again"	1:48
20.	"To the Architect"	3:50
Total length:		35:06
