= Nickelodeon Movies =

American film production company

Nickelodeon Movies Inc.
- Logo used since 2020
- Type: Division
- Industry: Film
- Founded: February 25, 1995; 31 years ago
- Headquarters: Los Angeles, California, U.S.
- Area served: Worldwide
- Products: Theatrical feature films; Animated films
- Parent: Paramount Pictures

Nickelodeon Movies Inc. is an American film production company based in Los Angeles. Originally founded on February 25, 1995, it serves as both the film production division of the American children's network Nickelodeon, and the family film distribution label of Paramount Pictures. It also collaborates with its sister studio, Paramount Animation, on a number of projects.

The division has earned numerous accolades including two Academy Awards, a Golden Globe Award, over 13 Saturn Awards nominations, a People's Choice Award, and four in-house honors via the Nickelodeon Kids' Choice Awards. Since its launch, over 40 feature films have been produced for theatrical release and starting in August 2021, the studio has produced films for streaming on Paramount+ and Netflix.

== History ==
=== 1993–95: Nickelodeon/20th Century Fox deal ===
In 1993, Nickelodeon agreed to a two-year contract with 20th Century Fox to make feature films. The joint venture would mostly produce new material, though a Nickelodeon executive did not rule out the possibility of making films based on The Ren & Stimpy Show, Rugrats and Doug. None of the movies were produced due to the 1994 acquisition of Paramount Pictures by Nickelodeon's parent company, Viacom, and they would distribute the movies instead. With the creative differences with John Kricfalusi, the creator of Ren & Stimpy and an inability to market that property in a family-friendly manner instead of a "cynical and gross humor" scuttled the film. However, Paramount and Viacom would go forward and start development on The Rugrats Movie a year after the acquisition.

The Nickelodeon version of the Doug film was not made due to the acquisition of the show's production studio, Jumbo Pictures, by The Walt Disney Company in 1996. With this, the show moved to Disney's ABC network and new seasons aired as a part of its programming block Disney's One Saturday Morning as Disney's Doug. In 1999, Walt Disney Pictures released a film finale to the series, Doug's 1st Movie.

=== 1995–99: Founding and early years ===
Logo used from 1998 to 2000

Nickelodeon Movies was founded on February 25, 1995. On July 10, 1996, the studio released its first film, Harriet the Spy, a spy-comedy film based on the 1964 novel of the same name. On July 25, 1997, the studio released its second film, Good Burger, a comedy film, starring Kenan Thompson, Kel Mitchell, Abe Vigoda, Dan Schneider, Shar Jackson, Josh Server, Lori Beth Denberg, Jan Schweiterman, Linda Cardellini and Sinbad. It was based on the Good Burger sketch on Nickelodeon's popular sketch comedy series All That.

On November 20, 1998, the studio released The Rugrats Movie, which was Nickelodeon Movies' first animated film and the first Nicktoon to be shown in theaters. It received mixed critical reception, but despite this, the movie became a box office success, becoming the first animated film not released by Disney to ever gross over $100 million domestically. The success of the film led to two sequels.

=== 2000s ===
Logo used from 2000 to 2008

On February 11, 2000, the studio released Snow Day, a comedy film starring Chevy Chase, Chris Elliott, Zena Grey, Josh Peck, Mark Webber, Schuyler Fisk, Jade Yorker and Emmanuelle Chriqui. This film met with negative reviews, yet it grossed $62,464,731 worldwide. Nine months later, the studio released Rugrats in Paris: The Movie on November 17, 2000. It was the first sequel to The Rugrats Movie and grossed $76,507,756 at the domestic box-office and $103,291,131 worldwide. The film received favorable reviews, becoming the most critically acclaimed Rugrats film to date.

On December 21, 2001, the studio released its first CGI-animated film, Jimmy Neutron: Boy Genius. It was based on a series of shorts that aired on Nickelodeon in 1998. It became a critical and box office success, earning $80,936,232 in the United States and $102,992,536 worldwide. It stars voice actors Debi Derryberry, Rob Paulsen, Carolyn Lawrence, Jeffrey Garcia, and Candi Milo, and co-starred Martin Short and Patrick Stewart. On March 24, 2002, Jimmy Neutron was nominated for the first Academy Award for Best Animated Feature, but lost to Shrek. It was the first Nickelodeon film to be nominated for an Academy Award. The success of the film spawned a TV series, The Adventures of Jimmy Neutron: Boy Genius, which aired on Nickelodeon from 2002 to 2006.

On March 29, 2002, the studio released Clockstoppers, a sci-fi action film, starring Jesse Bradford, Paula Garcés, French Stewart and Michael Biehn. This film received mixed-to-negative reviews and failed to recoup its budget in theaters. On June 28, Nickelodeon Movies released Hey Arnold!: The Movie, starring the series' original cast members and guest starring Paul Sorvino as Scheck, the CEO of a real estate company called Future Tech Industries. The film received negative reviews and grossed a small profit of $15.2 million. It was originally going to be a TV film entitled Arnold Saves the Neighborhood, but executives of Paramount Pictures decided to release this film theatrically. It was the first animated film from Nickelodeon to get a PG rating.

In 2002 and 2003, the studio, along with Klasky Csupo, released two films based on popular TV shows, The Wild Thornberrys Movie and Rugrats Go Wild, respectively. The Wild Thornberrys Movie was released on December 20, 2002, starring the show's original cast members, Lacey Chabert, Tim Curry, Jodi Carlisle, Danielle Harris, Michael "Flea" Balzary, and Tom Kane. This film received positive reviews and was a moderate box office success, grossing $40.1 million domestically and $60.7 million worldwide. On March 23, 2003, this film was nominated for an Academy Award for Best Original Song. Rugrats Go Wild, a crossover of Rugrats and The Wild Thornberrys, was released on June 13, 2003. This film met with negative critical reception and was a minor box office success, unlike previous Rugrats movies, earning $39.4 million in the United States and $55.4 million worldwide. This film is also the only Rugrats film to receive a PG rating.

On November 19, 2004, Nickelodeon released The SpongeBob SquarePants Movie, based on the popular Nickelodeon television series, SpongeBob SquarePants. This film received positive reviews and grossed $85.4 million in the United States and $140.2 million worldwide. The success of this film led to a sequel, and it was adapted into various media, including its own video game, soundtrack, books, and toy line.

Nickelodeon Movies had purchased the film rights of the A Series of Unfortunate Events book series in May 2000. Paramount Pictures, owner of Nickelodeon Movies, agreed to co-finance, along with Scott Rudin. Various directors, including Terry Gilliam and Roman Polanski, were interested in making the film. One of author Daniel Handler's, Lemony Snicket's real name, favorite candidates was Guy Maddin. In June 2002, Barry Sonnenfeld was hired to direct. He was chosen because he had previously collaborated with Rudin and because of his black comedy directing style as seen in his films The Addams Family, Addams Family Values and Get Shorty. Sonnenfeld referred to the Unfortunate Events books as his favorite children's stories. The director hired Handler to write the script with the intention of making Lemony Snicket as a musical, and cast Jim Carrey as Count Olaf in September 2002. Sonnenfeld eventually left over budget concerns in January 2003, and director Brad Silberling took over. This film was released on December 17, 2004, a month after The SpongeBob SquarePants Movie was released, to received positive reviews and was a moderate box office success. This film won the Academy Award for Best Makeup in 2005, becoming the first film from Nickelodeon Movies to win an Academy Award.

In 2005, the studio and Paramount Classics purchased a documentary film, Mad Hot Ballroom, at the 2005 Slamdance Film Festival in Park City, Utah. It became the studios' first (and so far only) documentary film, the first Nickelodeon feature to be released outside of the main Paramount Pictures label, and their only film to have a limited theatrical release. The movie made back its low budget and was also a critical success.

Several months later, the studio and Paramount Pictures released their first co-production with both Columbia Pictures and Metro-Goldwyn-Mayer and released a family comedy film, Yours, Mine and Ours, a remake of the 1968 film of the same name. This film stars Dennis Quaid and Rene Russo. This film was critically panned and failed to make a profit in theatres.

On June 16, 2006, Nickelodeon released the wrestling comedy film Nacho Libre. It was very loosely based on the story of Fray Tormenta. This film stars Jack Black, Héctor Jiménez, and Ana de la Reguera. This film met with mixed critical reception, but was a box office success, earning $80,197,993 in the domestic box office and grossing $99,255,460 worldwide. A sequel to this film is being considered.

Two months later, the studio released another animated film, Barnyard, starring the voices of Kevin James, as Otis, a carefree cow who loves throwing parties, Courteney Cox as Daisy, a kind-hearted cow, David Koechner as Dag, an evil coyote, Sam Elliott as Ben, Otis's father and the leader of the barnyard, Danny Glover as Miles, an old mule, among other Los Angeles voice actors. This film met with negative critical reception, but was a moderate box office success, earning $72,637,803 at the United States box office and grossing $116,476,887 worldwide. Like Jimmy Neutron: Boy Genius, the film's success has spawned a TV show, Back at the Barnyard, which ran from 2007 to 2011 on Nickelodeon, longer than The Adventures of Jimmy Neutron: Boy Genius. Chris Hardwick replaced Kevin James in the role of Otis.

On December 15, 2006, the studio released Charlotte's Web, a family drama film based on E. B. White's book of the same name, starring Dakota Fanning, Kevin Anderson, Beau Bridges, and the voices of Dominic Scott Kay, Julia Roberts, Steve Buscemi, John Cleese, Oprah Winfrey, Robert Redford, Reba McEntire, Kathy Bates, with Thomas Haden Church and Cedric the Entertainer. This film became a critical and box office success, earning $82,985,708 in the United States and $144,877,632 worldwide. This was Nickelodeon's first G-rated film in five years and first live-action film rated G, as well as the studio's highest-grossing film with that rating. Dakota Fanning won a Blimp Award for Favorite Movie Actress at the 2007 Kids' Choice Awards.

Two years later, on February 14, 2008, the studio released The Spiderwick Chronicles, a fantasy drama film based on the bestselling book of the same name, starring Freddie Highmore, Sarah Bolger, Mary-Louise Parker, Martin Short, Nick Nolte, and Seth Rogen. This film was released in both regular and IMAX theaters and received favorable reviews and was a box office success, earning $71,195,053 in the United States and $162,839,667 outside of the United States.

Logo used from 2008 to 2009 (Note: This logo was revived in 2023, and is still being used as a secondary logo as of 2026.)

On July 28, 2008, Paramount Pictures and Nickelodeon Movies released a coming-of-age comedy film, Angus, Thongs, and Perfect Snogging, based on two bestselling British novels by Louise Rennison, Angus, Thongs and Full-Frontal Snogging and It's OK, I'm Wearing Really Big Knickers. The film met with positive reviews and was a box office success. It was released in theaters in the United Kingdom, earning £8,647,770 and grossing £13,835,569 worldwide. To date, it has had a direct-to-DVD release in the United States and has made its U.S. premiere on Nick at Nite on March 12, 2009. It was also the first film from Nickelodeon Movies to receive a PG-13 rating.

On January 16, 2009, Hotel for Dogs was released under Paramount's DreamWorks label, starring Emma Roberts, Jake T. Austin, Johnny Simmons, Kyla Pratt, Troy Gentile, with Lisa Kudrow, Kevin Dillon and Don Cheadle. It was based on the 1971 novel of the same name by Lois Duncan. This film received mixed reviews from film critics, but was a box office success, earning $73,034,460 at the United States box office and grossing $117,000,198 worldwide. Five months later on June 12, Paramount Pictures released Nickelodeon Movies' Imagine That, a comedy-drama film starring Eddie Murphy, Thomas Haden Church, Nicole Ari Parker, Martin Sheen, Marin Hinkle, and Yara Shahidi. The film received mixed reviews, which criticized Murphy's performance, and failed to profit at the box office.

=== 2010s ===
On January 8, 2007, Paramount Pictures and Nickelodeon Movies announced that they had signed M. Night Shyamalan to write, direct and produce a trilogy of live-action films based on the Avatar: The Last Airbender series, the first of which would encompass the main characters' adventures in Book One. The film was later released in theaters in 3D on July 1, 2010, and was universally panned by critics, fans, and even from audiences who weren't familiar with the TV series and is often considered one of the worst movies ever made. A year later, it won five Razzies, including worst screenplay, worst director and worst picture of the year. This was the studio's first feature film released in 3-D. On its opening day in the United States, The Last Airbender made $16 million, ranking fifth overall for Thursday openings. Despite negative critical reception, the film was a box office success, and grossed $131,601,062 in the United States box office, also grossed $187,340,196 in other countries, making for a total of $318,941,258 worldwide. That planned trilogy was finally scrapped in 2018, to make way for a new, unrelated, live-action series produced by Netflix.

Logo used from 2009 to 2019 (Note: This logo is still being used as a secondary logo as of 2026.)

On March 4, 2011, Nickelodeon Movies released Rango, an animated western comedy film, directed by Gore Verbinski and starring Johnny Depp, Isla Fisher, Bill Nighy, Abigail Breslin, Alfred Molina, Harry Dean Stanton, Ray Winstone, Timothy Olyphant and Ned Beatty. The film was produced by Gore Verbinski's production company Blind Wink, and Graham King's GK Films. The animation was created by Industrial Light & Magic (ILM), marking its first full-length animated feature. ILM usually does visual effects for live-action films. It was also the first animated film for Verbinski. During voice recording, the actors received costumes and sets to "give them the feel of the Wild West"; star Johnny Depp had 20 days in which to voice Rango and the filmmakers scheduled the supporting actors to interact with him. Verbinski said his attempt with Rango was to do a "small" film after the large-scale Pirates of the Caribbean trilogy, but that he underestimated how painstaking and time-consuming animated filmmaking is. This film has met universal acclaim from critics and general audiences alike and was the first Nickelodeon film to win the Academy Award for Best Animated Feature, ten years on since the category was introduced when Jimmy Neutron was nominated. The success of Rango led Paramount to create its own animation studio, Paramount Animation.

Nine months later, Paramount Pictures and Nickelodeon Movies partnered with Columbia Pictures once again and released The Adventures of Tintin, a performance-captured animated 3D film, directed by Steven Spielberg and produced by Peter Jackson, with the voices of Jamie Bell, Andy Serkis, Daniel Craig, Simon Pegg and Nick Frost, and based on three from the comic book series of the same name by Hergé, The Crab with the Golden Claws (1941), The Secret of the Unicorn (1943), and Red Rackham's Treasure (1944). This film was released in 3D and IMAX 3D theaters, as well normal "2D" theaters, and earned $77,591,831 in North America and $296,402,120 in other territories, for a worldwide total of $373,993,951. It also was studio's first animated film to be shown in 3D. John Williams, the composer for the film, was nominated for an Academy Award for Best Original Score. This film became the first non-Pixar film to win a Golden Globe Award for Best Animated Feature Film, and was the first Nickelodeon film to do so.

On February 28, 2012, a sequel to The SpongeBob SquarePants Movie titled The SpongeBob Movie: Sponge Out of Water was announced to be in production and was scheduled to be released in 2015. Philippe Dauman, the president and CEO of the studio's parent company Viacom, told sources:

"We will be releasing a SpongeBob movie at the end of 2014, which will serve to start off or be one of our films that starts off our new animation effort."

Dauman also once again said that the Paramount animation productions would be a new opportunity for his company as they would each cost less than $100 million, and the animation unit would only have 30 to 40 people, allowing for good financial returns and profits. Thanks to modern technology, the films still look "great" despite the lower cost, he said. He also lauded his studio team for winning an animation Oscar for Rango, the studio's first fully owned CGI effort. "We're very proud of that," he said.

The sequel was directed by Paul Tibbitt, written by Jonathan Aibel and Glenn Berger, produced by Mary Parent, and executive-produced by the series' creator, Stephen Hillenburg. The series' cast members reprised their roles from the first film. The sequel was animated using the same animation style (traditional animation) as the TV show.

In 2012, following the news of the Viacom buyout of the Teenage Mutant Ninja Turtles franchise, it was announced that Nickelodeon would produce a new film through Paramount Pictures with an expected release date sometime in 2012. In late May 2011, it was announced that Paramount and Nickelodeon had brought Michael Bay and his Platinum Dunes partners Brad Fuller and Andrew Form on to produce the next film that would reboot the film series. Bay, Fuller, and Form would produce alongside Walker and Mednick. For the script, the studio originally hired Art Marcum and Matt Holloway to write the film for close to a million dollars. A year later the studio turned to writers Josh Appelbaum and André Nemec to rewrite the script. In February 2012, Jonathan Liebesman was brought into negotiations to direct the film. It was released on August 8, 2014.

On October 26, 2012, the studio released a Halloween comedy film, Fun Size, starring Victoria Justice, Johnny Knoxville, and Thomas Mann. This film met with negative reviews and was a box office failure. It grossed $11.4 million and is the lowest wide-grossed film ever produced by Nickelodeon Movies.

A reboot of Teenage Mutant Ninja Turtles opened on August 8, 2014. It was the biggest opening weekend for any movie produced by Nickelodeon Movies, grossing over $65 million in its first three days of release in the United States. It has since become Nickelodeon Movies's highest-grossing movie domestically (in North America) and worldwide, with over $191 million domestically and a total of $493.3 million worldwide.

On February 6, 2015, The SpongeBob Movie: Sponge Out of Water, the second film based on SpongeBob SquarePants, was released. The film grossed almost $163 million in the United States and $323.4 million worldwide, making it the third-most successful film produced by the studio.

On June 3, 2016, the studio released Teenage Mutant Ninja Turtles: Out of the Shadows. The film was met with mixed reviews and grossed $240.6 million worldwide.

Nickelodeon Movies was also involved in the film Monster Trucks, though merely as a label partner as Paramount vacillated several times about including the Nickelodeon Movies vanity card within the film. It was released on January 13, 2017, and was unsuccessful at the box office.

An original animated feature produced by Paramount Animation and Nickelodeon Movies in association with Ilion Animation Studios, titled Wonder Park, released on March 15, 2019, after several changes in its release due to internal corporate politics, with reviews being mixed, praising the animation and voice acting while criticizing the story and tone, grossing $119 million against a budget of $80–100 million, and a subsequent planned animated series was shelved.

On August 9, 2019, the studio released the first film based on Nick Jr.'s Dora the Explorer, titled Dora and the Lost City of Gold. Produced by Paramount Players, it was directed by James Bobin. It received positive reviews and was a box office success.

Nickelodeon Movies distributed an original feature called Playing with Fire, starring John Cena, and directed by Andy Fickman. The film was released on November 8, 2019. It received negative reviews but was a modest box office success.

=== 2020s–present ===
A third SpongeBob film, Sponge on the Run, was released in Canadian theaters on August 14, 2020, and digitally on Netflix in other territories on November 5, 2020, followed by a release via PVOD and on Paramount+, in the United States, on March 4, 2021, following the COVID-19 pandemic. The film was directed and co-written by former writer Tim Hill. It was the last SpongeBob film to involve series creator Stephen Hillenburg, who died on November 26, 2018, from ALS.

On May 19, 2019, a film based on Paw Patrol—a Canadian series aired by Nick Jr. in the United States—was announced. The film was produced in Canada by Spin Master Entertainment, with Nickelodeon Movies signing on to present the film internationally. Unlike previous films from Nickelodeon Movies, the copyright to PAW Patrol: The Movie is not owned by Paramount, with Spin Master owning the copyright and Paramount/Nickelodeon only serving as distributors. The film was directed and co-written by Cal Brunker, and it was released in both Canada and the United States on August 20, 2021, and simultaneously streaming on Paramount+. The film received positive reviews and was a box office success.

Additionally, the studio also released two direct to streaming movies: The Loud House Movie, a film adaptation based on Nickelodeon's popular Nicktoon of the same name for Netflix, which was released on August 20, 2021, the same day as the Paw Patrol movie. The film received praise for animation, acting and songs though some criticized the plot. The other film, The J Team, a musical comedy starring JoJo Siwa was released on Paramount+ on September 3, 2021, as an original film.

Paws of Fury: The Legend of Hank, directed by Rob Minkoff and Mark Koetsier and starring Michael Cera, Ricky Gervais, Mel Brooks, George Takei, Aasif Mandvi, Gabriel Iglesias, Djimon Hounsou, Michelle Yeoh, Kylie Kuioka, and Samuel L. Jackson was released theatrically on July 15, 2022, in the United States and other territories.

Rise of the Teenage Mutant Ninja Turtles: The Movie was released on Netflix on August 5, 2022.

On July 12, 2021, it was revealed that Blue's Big City Adventure, a live-action/animated hybrid movie based on Blue's Clues & You!, would be made to mark the 25th anniversary of the franchise. Directed by Matt Stawski and written by Angela Santomero and Liz Maccie, the film began production in summer 2021. The film was released on Paramount+ on November 18, 2022.

On November 25, 2022, a sports comedy starring Marsai Martin titled Fantasy Football was released on Paramount+.

On July 27, 2023, a sequel film to the television series Zoey 101, titled Zoey 102, starring many of the original cast, was released on Paramount+.

On August 2, 2023, a CG-animated reboot of the Teenage Mutant Ninja Turtles franchise, titled Teenage Mutant Ninja Turtles: Mutant Mayhem, was released. It was a collaboration between Nickelodeon Movies and Point Grey Pictures and directed by Jeff Rowe.

The sequel to Paw Patrol: The Movie, titled Paw Patrol: The Mighty Movie was released on September 29, 2023, with Cal Brunker returning as director and Jennifer Dodge, Laura Clunie and Toni Stevens as producers.

In March 2023, Good Burger 2 was announced, with Thompson and Mitchell reprising their roles. The film was released on Paramount+ on November 22, 2023.

A follow-up film to the Loud House spin-off series The Casagrandes, titled The Casagrandes Movie, was released on Netflix on March 22, 2024.

The first of three SpongeBob SquarePants spin-off films, titled Saving Bikini Bottom: The Sandy Cheeks Movie, was released on Netflix on August 2, 2024.

In June 2024, Netflix announced Plankton: The Movie, a spin-off film centered on the antagonist character Plankton. The film was released on March 7, 2025. It was directed by David Needham and written by Kaz, Chris Viscardi, and Mr. Lawrence (the voice of Plankton), from a story by Lawrence.

A fourth theatrical SpongeBob SquarePants film, titled The SpongeBob Movie: Search for SquarePants, and three spinoff films set for release on Paramount+ were announced in February 2022, with Saving Bikini Bottom: The Sandy Cheeks Movie released on August 2, 2024, on Netflix and Search for SquarePants released on December 19, 2025.

An animated Avatar film titled Avatar Aang: The Last Airbender, centered on the original characters, began production in October 2022. It serves as the first project from Avatar Studios and was released on Paramount+ on July 25, 2026.

On September 26, 2023, Spin Master announced that a third Paw Patrol film, later known as Paw Patrol: The Dino Movie, was in development. The film was released on August 14, 2026.

== Upcoming projects ==
On March 2, 2021, Yokai Samba, a film previously in development at DreamWorks Animation, had been picked up by the studio.

On August 2, 2021, Paramount Pictures announced that a new Teenage Mutant Ninja Turtles live-action film was in the works with Colin Jost and Casey Jost penning the script and Michael Bay, Andrew Form, Brad Fuller, Scott Mednick and Galen Walker signing on as producers.

In July 2023, a sequel to Teenage Mutant Ninja Turtles: Mutant Mayhem was announced, with Jeff Rowe returning to direct and Point Grey Pictures returning to co-produce. The film is scheduled for release on August 13, 2027.

== Filmography ==
=== Franchises ===
Title	Films	Shorts	Release dates
Hey Arnold!	1	1	1996–2002
Good Burger	2	0	1997–present
Rugrats	3	0	1998-2003
Snow Day	2	0	2000-present
The Wild Thornberrys	2	0	2002-2003
SpongeBob SquarePants	6	1	2004–present
Avatar Legends	2	0	2010–present
Teenage Mutant Ninja Turtles	6	1	2014–present
Dora the Explorer	2	1	2019–present
PAW Patrol	3	0	2021–present
The Loud House	5	0	2021–present
The Thundermans	2	0	2024–present
