= This Year, Next Year, Sometime ...? =

EP by Mirrors
- Released: 26 January 2012
- Recorded: June 2010 – November 2011
- Genre: Synthpop
- Length: 23:10
- Label: Self released
- Producer: Mirrors

Mirrors chronology
Broken by Silence (2010)	This Year, Next Year, Sometime ...? (2012)

This Year, Next Year, Sometime ...? is the second studio EP by British synthpop band Mirrors and the first release since the departure of Ally Young. The EP was released in order to finance the band's forthcoming second studio album and contains two previously released songs and five unreleased demos which were recorded during their first album sessions in June 2010 and in the 4th quarter of 2011.

== Track listing ==
All tracks are written by Mirrors.

No.	Title	Length
1.	"Dust"	3:48
2.	"Shooting Stars"	3:56
3.	"Blood Diamond (Home Demo)"	3:44
4.	"Pick Me Up (Home Demo)"	2:06
5.	"Nothing Lost (Home Demo)"	4:18
6.	"Leave Me Here (Home Demo)"	2:16
7.	"Dead Air (Home Demo)"	3:02

== Personnel ==
All tracks:

- James New
- James Arguile
- Josef Page

Tracks 5 and 7 feature Ally Young. It is unsure which other tracks might also feature his input.
