= Look at Me (Mirrors song) =

Mirrors song

Single by Mirrors
- B-side: "none"
- Released: 10 August 2009
- Recorded: 2009
- Genre: Synthpop
- Length: 3:45
- Label: Pure Groove
- Songwriter(s): Mirrors
- Producer(s): Mirrors

Mirrors singles chronology
"Look at Me" (2009)	"Into the Heart" (2009)

"Look at Me" is the first studio single by British synthpop band Mirrors. The single was released in the UK on 10 August 2009 as a one sided 7" on red vinyl and as a digital download. It is said that the 7" was limited to just 200 copies.

The song was re-recorded in June 2010 for inclusion on their debut album Lights and Offerings.
"Look at Me" was covered by Laura Cantrell in December 2009 and was included on Mirrors' first EP Broken by Silence, just as the Pure Groove version of "Look at Me".

The promotional CD-single contains an edit of the song with a trimmed intro.

== Track listing ==
All tracks are written by Mirrors

7"/Download single
No.	Title	Length
1.	"Look at Me (Pure Groove version)"	3:45

Promotional CD-single
No.	Title	Length
1.	"Look at Me (Pure Groove version) (Edit)"	3:39

== Re-release ==
"Look at Me"

Single by Mirrors

from the album Lights and Offerings
- B-side: "Perfectly Still"
- Released: 6 June 2011
- Recorded: 2010
- Genre: Synthpop
- Length: 3:44
- Label: Skint Records
- Songwriter(s): Mirrors
- Producer(s): Mirrors

Mirrors singles chronology
"The White EP" (2011)	"Look at Me" (2011)	"Ways to an End (Radioactive Man Rework)" (2011)

The song was re-released on 6 June 2011 on the Skint Records label to promote the "Lights and Offerings" album. This re-issue contains a new remix and "Perfectly Still" which was previously a bonus track on the German "Lights and Offerings" CD and UK vinyl album.

== Track listing ==
All tracks are written by Mirrors

7" single
No.	Title	Length
1.	"Look at Me"	3:44
2.	"Perfectly Still"	3:47

Digital single
No.	Title	Length
1.	"Look at Me"	3:44
2.	"Perfectly Still"	3:47
3.	"Look at Me (Radio Edit)"	3:24

== Personnel ==
- James New
- Ally Young
- James Arguile
- Josef Page
