= The White EP (Mirrors EP) =

Single by Mirrors
- B-side: "Lights And Offerings (Belbury Poly Mix)"
- Released: 16 April 2011
- Recorded: 2010
- Genre: Synthpop
- Length: 3:51
- Label: Skint Records
- Songwriter(s): Mirrors
- Producer(s): Mirrors / Jim Jupp

Mirrors singles chronology
"Into the Heart" (2011)	"The White EP" (2011)	"Look at Me" (2011)

"The White EP" is a Record Store Day 7" single on white vinyl by British synthpop band Mirrors. The single was released in the UK on 16 April 2011.

The single includes two songs which were released on Mirrors' first EP Broken by Silence in November 2010.

The A-side features a cover version by Laura Cantrell, whereas the B-side is a remix of their non-album track "Lights and Offerings".

== Track listing ==
All tracks are written by Mirrors

7" single
No.	Title	Length
1.	"Look at Me" (cover by Laura Cantrell)	3:51
2.	"Lights And Offerings (Belbury Poly Mix)"	5:07

== Personnel ==
A-side:

- Laura Cantrell (vocals)
- William Tyler (acoustic guitar)
- Chris Scruggs (upright bass)
- Paul Niehaus (pedal steel guitar)
- Fats Kaplin (fiddle)
- Paul Burch (fender rhodes)
- Ben Martin (percussion)

B-side:

- James New
- Ally Young
- James Arguile
- Josef Page
