= Hide and Seek (Mirrors song) =

Studio single by Mirrors

Single by Mirrors
- B-side: "Toe the Line"
- Released: 15 November 2010
- Recorded: June 2010
- Genre: Synthpop
- Length: 3:53
- Label: Skint Records
- Songwriter: Mirrors
- Producer: Mirrors

Mirrors singles chronology
"Ways to an End" (2010)	"Hide and Seek" (2010)	"Into the Heart" (2011)

Alternative cover
- Hide and Seek (Remixes)

Professional ratings
Review scores
Source	Rating
SoundBlab	(7.5/10)

"Hide and Seek" is the fourth studio single by British synthpop band Mirrors, released in the UK on 15 November 2010 as a 7" single, 12" single and as a digital download.

The song was included on Mirrors' first EP Broken by Silence which was released in the same month and later included on their debut album Lights and Offerings in February 2011.

The 12" single is marked as a promotional item and comes in a black die-cut sleeve, while the digital remix bundle features a red-tinted sleeve variant.

The Guardian's Paul Lester wrote that the track "throbs like OMD when they were proud to be known as Orchestral Manoeuvres in the Dark".

== Track listing ==
All tracks are written by Mirrors.

7" single
No.	Title	Length
1.	"Hide and Seek"	3:53
2.	"Toe the Line"	4:39

12" single
No.	Title	Length
1.	"Hide and Seek (Liv Spencer (House of House) Remix)"	8:05
2.	"Hide and Seek (Liv Spencer (House of House) Dub)"	7:52
3.	"Hide and Seek (Leo Zero Remix)"	7:53

Digital single
No.	Title	Length
1.	"Hide and Seek (Single Version)" (this version could only be purchased at Skint Records)	4:11
2.	"Toe the Line"	4:39

Digital single (Remixes)
No.	Title	Length
1.	"Hide and Seek (Liv Spencer (House of House) Remix)"	8:05
2.	"Hide and Seek (Leo Zero Remix)"	7:53
3.	"Hide and Seek (Kwes Rework)"	2:42
4.	"Hide and Seek (Liv Spencer (House of House) Dub)"	7:52
5.	"Hide and Seek (Liv Spencer (House of House) Instrumental)"	8:05

== Personnel ==
- James New
- Ally Young
- James Arguile
- Josef Page
