= Into the Heart (Mirrors song) =

2009 single by Mirrors

Single by Mirrors
- B-side: "Lights and Offerings (Moshi Moshi version)"
- Released: 2 November 2009
- Recorded: 2009
- Genre: Synthpop
- Length: 3:49
- Label: Moshi Moshi
- Songwriter(s): Mirrors
- Producer(s): Mirrors

Mirrors singles chronology
"Look at Me" (2009)	"Into the Heart" (2009)	"Ways to an End" (2010)

"Into the Heart" is the second studio single by British synthpop band Mirrors. The single was released in the UK on 2 November 2009 as a 7" vinyl single and as a digital download on the Moshi Moshi Records label.

"Lights and Offerings" was re-recorded during the Lights and Offerings album sessions in June 2010, but never mixed or finished for inclusion on the album. The Moshi Moshi version was however included on the Broken by Silence Tour EP.

== Track listing ==
All tracks are written by Mirrors

No.	Title	Length
1.	"Into the Heart (Moshi Moshi version)"	3:49
2.	"Lights and Offerings (Moshi Moshi version)"	4:28

== Re-release ==
"Into the Heart"

Single by Mirrors

from the album Lights and Offerings
- B-side: "Falls by Another Name"
- Released: 14 February 2011
- Recorded: 2010
- Genre: Synthpop
- Length: 4:03
- Label: Skint Records
- Songwriter(s): Mirrors
- Producer(s): Mirrors

Mirrors singles chronology
"Hide and Seek" (2010)	"Into the Heart" (2011)	"The White EP" (2011)

The song was re-released on 14 February 2011 on the Skint Records label to promote the "Lights and Offerings" album. This re-issue contained the re-recorded version, a new B-side and a new remix.

A 12" single will be released in Greece at the end of May on the Undo Records label which will be limited to 500 copies. It is currently unknown which tracks are going to be featured on the disc.

Note that the 7" contains a stand-alone version of "Into the Heart" with a full heartbeat outro whereas the digital release contains the album version excluding the interlude of 21 seconds which is simply cut off at the end of the song.

== Track listing ==
All tracks are written by Mirrors

7" single
No.	Title	Length
1.	"Into the Heart"	4:03
2.	"Falls by Another Name"	3:25

Digital single
No.	Title	Length
1.	"Into the Heart"	3:58
2.	"Falls by Another Name"	3:25
3.	"Into The Heart (Jonathan Kreinik Mix)"	8:21
4.	"Into The Heart (Richard X Radio Mix)"	3:33

iTunes release/promotional single
No.	Title	Length
1.	"Into The Heart (Richard X Radio Mix)"	3:33
2.	"Into The Heart (Album Radio Edit)"	3:34
3.	"Falls by Another Name"	3:25

== Personnel ==
- James New
- Ally Young
- James Arguile
- Josef Page
