= Ways to an End =

2010 single by Mirrors

Single by Mirrors
- B-side: "Broken by Silence"
- Released: 23 August 2010
- Recorded: June 2010
- Genre: Synthpop
- Length: 4:51
- Label: Skint Records
- Songwriter: Mirrors
- Producer: Mirrors

Mirrors singles chronology
"Into the Heart" (2009)	"Ways to an End" (2010)	"Hide and Seek" (2010)

"Ways to an End" is the third studio single by British synthpop band Mirrors. The single was released in the UK on 23 August 2010 as a 7" single and as a digital download.

The song was included on Mirrors' first EP Broken by Silence three months later and released on their debut album Lights and Offerings in February 2011.

== Track listing ==
All tracks are written by Mirrors.

7" single
No.	Title	Length
1.	"Ways to an End"	4:51
2.	"Broken by Silence"	5:04

Digital single
No.	Title	Length
1.	"Ways to an End (Radio Edit)"	3:33
2.	"Ways to an End"	4:51
3.	"Broken by Silence"	5:04

iTunes bonus tracks
No.	Title	Length
4.	"Of the Night and the Light and the Half Light"	3:24
5.	"Of the Night and the Light and the Half Light" (video)	4:31

== Radioactive Man Rework ==
"Ways to an End (Radioactive Man Rework)"

Single by Mirrors

from the album Lights and Offerings
- B-side: "Ways To An End (Radioactive Man Instrumental)"
- Released: 12 September 2011
- Recorded: 2010
- Genre: Synthpop
- Length: 6:51
- Label: Skint Records
- Songwriter: Mirrors
- Producer: Mirrors

Mirrors singles chronology
"Look at Me" (2011)	"Ways to an End (Radioactive Man Rework)" (2011)

A rework of the track "Ways to an End" was released on 12 September 2011, remixed by Radioactive Man. The single was released as a digital single only through iTunes and other online stores.

== Track listing ==
All tracks are written by Mirrors.

Digital single
No.	Title	Length
1.	"Ways To An End (Radioactive Man Remix)"	6:51
2.	"Ways To An End (Radioactive Man Instrumental)"	6:51

== Personnel ==
- James New
- Ally Young
- James Arguile
- Josef Page
