= Lights and Offerings =

Studio album by Mirrors
- Released: 28 February 2011
- Recorded: June 2010
- Genre: Synthpop
- Length: 50:32
- Label: Skint Records
- Producer: Mirrors

Alternative cover
- Offres et Lumières

Singles from Lights and Offerings
- 1. "Ways to an End" Released: 23 August 2010; 2. "Hide and Seek" Released: 15 November 2010; 3. "Into the Heart" Released: 14 February 2011; 4. "Look at Me" Released: 6 June 2011

Professional ratings
Review scores
Source	Rating
NME	(5/10)
Drowned in Sound	(6/10)
MusicOMH	4/5 stars
Virgin	overall positive
Das Musikmagazin	3/5 stars
Subba Cultcha	(6/10)

Lights and Offerings is the first studio album by British synthpop band Mirrors. The album was released in the UK on 28 February 2011 and on 18 March 2011 in Europe.

The title comes from the Mirrors song "Lights and Offerings" which was a B-side of their 2009 single "Into the Heart". The song was re-recorded during their album sessions in June 2010, but never mixed or finished for inclusion on the album.

Most songs were already written and demoed in 2009. The songs "Secrets" and "Hide and Seek" originally started as Mumm-Ra songs, written by James New. "Secrets" was later transformed into a 14 minutes song though the band decided to edit the track down to 10 minutes due to pressure from the record label. Mirrors released a few demos in 2009 and 2010 of songs that would later appear on the album, being "Hide and Seek", "Organ Song" (which would be re-titled to "Write Through the Night"), "Searching in the Wilderness", "Look at Me", "Into the Heart", "Fear of Drowning" and "Somewhere Strange".

Critics drew comparisons to electronic acts such as Kraftwerk, OMD and Depeche Mode.

== Overview ==
A number of different releases have been issued so far by three record labels.

Skint Records releases:

- The full album on CD.
- The full album on CD in a promotional box with two extra 7" singles, a press sheet and promotional photo. Limited to 300 copies of which approx 60 copies were destroyed due to the stencilling process and approx 40 were put up for sale at Skint Records.
- The full album on CD in the same promo box, though made for purchase by the public. This box is numbered inside the lid and comes with two additional 7" singles. Limited to approx 40 numbered copies.
- The full album on CD, coming with an exclusive bonus CD. Three different bonus CDs were made, to be sold exclusively through RecordStore.co.uk (catalogue number MIRRORS004), RoughTrade (MIRRORS005) and Skint Records (MIRRORS006, pre-order only).
- The full album as a double 12" vinyl with two bonus tracks, released on 3 May 2011 through the Skint Records webshop and 24 May 2011 through all big online retailers.
- The album was digitally released in France on 3 May 2011 with 6 bonus tracks. The album features French album and song titles, though the songs are the common English versions.
- The album was digitally re-released in October 2011 with three bonus tracks.

PIAS release:

- The full album on CD with two bonus tracks, being "Visions of You" and "Perfectly Still". This CD was only released in Germany.

Undo Records release:

- The full album on CD with a bonus CD, only issued in Greece. Both discs are featured in a digipack with a black slipcase. The bonus disc contains some B-side and remixes. Released on 16 May 2011, although copies were not shipped out until end of June due to issues at the pressing plant.

There is furthermore a digital release which contains the full album on iTunes with an additional seven bonus tracks and five videos, including a live performance in Hamburg from 2010 and an album commentary.

A promotional CD was made available through a Facebook competition in March 2011 featuring the Hamburg live performance from 2010 which was also available on iTunes. This promotional item however also includes an additional track being the intro of the concert.

== Track listing ==
All tracks are written by Mirrors (except where stated).

No.	Title	Writer(s)	Length
1.	"Fear of Drowning"		6:23
2.	"Look at Me"		3:44
3.	"Into the Heart"		4:20
4.	"Write Through the Night"		4:34
5.	"Ways to an End"		4:51
6.	"Hide and Seek"		3:53
7.	"Somewhere Strange"		5:44
8.	"Something on Your Mind"	Dino Valenti	3:02
9.	"Searching in the Wilderness"		3:30
10.	"Secrets"		10:31

German bonus CD tracks
No.	Title	Length
11.	"Visions of You"	3:50
12.	"Perfectly Still"	3:47

Greek bonus disc
No.	Title	Length
1.	"Broken by Silence"	5:06
2.	"Toe the Line"	4:42
3.	"Lights and Offerings (Moshi Moshi version)"	4:28
4.	"Falls by Another Name"	3:25
5.	"Perfectly Still"	3:47
6.	"Visions Of You"	3:50
7.	"Into the Heart (Richard X Radio Mix)"	3:33
8.	"Into the Heart (Greek Girls Are Not Easy Radio Mix)"	4:34
9.	"Secrets (Andy McCluskey Remix)"	4:29

RecordStore.co.uk bonus disc
No.	Title	Length
1.	"Lights and Offerings (exclusive bonus CD)" (mixtape)	57:22

RoughTrade bonus disc
No.	Title	Length
1.	"Lights and Offerings (exclusive bonus CD)" (mixtape)	61:01

Skint Records bonus disc
No.	Title	Length
1.	"Write Through the Night (Rudi Zygadlo Remix)"	4:37
2.	"Hide and Seek (Leo Zero Remix)"	7:50
3.	"Lights and Offerings (Belbury Poly Mix)"	5:04
4.	"Hide and Seek (Kwes Rework)"	2:44
5.	"Into the Heart (Jonathan Kreinik Mix)"	8:17
6.	"Write Through the Night (Leo Zero Club Mix)"	9:39
7.	"Hide and Seek (Liv Spencer (House of House) Remix)"	8:08
8.	"Into the Heart (AlunaGeorge Remix)"	2:54
9.	"Secrets (Andy McCluskey Remix)"	4:29
10.	"Look at Me" (cover by Laura Cantrell)	3:55

iTunes bonus tracks
No.	Title	Length
11.	"Fear of Drowning (Live in Hamburg)"	6:32
12.	"Ways to an End (Live in Hamburg)"	4:42
13.	"Write Through the Night (Live in Hamburg)"	4:48
14.	"Into the Heart (Live in Hamburg)"	4:16
15.	"Searching in the Wilderness (Live in Hamburg)"	3:22
16.	"Hide and Seek (Live in Hamburg)"	4:22
17.	"Mirrors Lights and Offerings album commentary"	50:34
18.	"Ways to an End" (video)	4:48
19.	"Into the Heart" (video)	3:41
20.	"Hide and Seek" (video)	3:31
21.	"Fear of Drowning" (video)	6:23
22.	"Look at Me" (video)	3:47

Vinyl edition: side one
No.	Title	Length
1.	"Fear of Drowning"	6:23
2.	"Look at Me"	3:44
3.	"Into the Heart"	4:20

Vinyl edition: side two
No.	Title	Length
4.	"Write Through the Night"	4:34
5.	"Ways to an End"	4:51
6.	"Hide and Seek"	3:53

Vinyl edition: side three
No.	Title	Length
7.	"Visions of You"	3:50
8.	"Somewhere Strange"	5:44
9.	"Perfectly Still"	3:47

Vinyl edition: side four
No.	Title	Length
10.	"Something on Your Mind"	3:02
11.	"Searching in the Wilderness"	3:30
12.	"Secrets"	10:31

French digital release (Offres et Lumières)
No.	Title	Writer(s)	Length
1.	"Peur de la Noyade" (Fear of Drowning)		6:23
2.	"Regarde-moi" (Look at Me)		3:44
3.	"Dans le Coeur" (Into the Heart)		3:56
4.	"Ecris dans la Nuit" (Write Through the Night)		4:57
5.	"Pour en finir" (Ways to an End)		4:51
6.	"Cache-cache" (Hide and Seek)		3:53
7.	"Un Lieu étrange" (Somewhere Strange)		5:44
8.	"Quelque chose en tete" (Something on Your Mind)	Dino Valenti	3:02
9.	"En Recherche dans la Nature" (Searching in the Wilderness)		3:30
10.	"Secrets"		10:31
11.	"Dons et Lumières" (Lights and Offerings (Moshi Moshi version))		4:27
12.	"Frise avec la ligne" (Toe the Line)		4:39
13.	"Cassé par le Silence" (Broken by Silence)		5:04
14.	"Sous un autre Nom" (Falls by Another Name)		3:25
15.	"Dons et Lumières (Belbury Poly Mix)" (Lights and Offerings (Belbury Poly Mix))		5:05
16.	"Regarde-moi" (Look at Me) (cover by Laura Cantrell)		3:55

Skint Records digital bonus tracks
No.	Title	Length
11.	"Visions of You"	3:50
12.	"Perfectly Still"	3:47
13.	"Lights and Offerings (Moshi Moshi version)"	4:28

== B-sides and other tracks ==
"Broken by Silence" - B-side to digital download and 7" version of "Ways to an End" single.
"Of the Night and the Light and the Half Light" - bonus track on the "Ways to an End" iTunes release. The music comes from the video with the same name.
"Toe the Line" - B-side to digital download and 7" version of "Hide and Seek" single.
"Falls by Another Name" - B-side to digital download and 7" version of "Into the Heart" 2011 single.

== Personnel ==
- James New
- Ally Young
- James Arguile
- Josef Page
