= Chloe (soundtrack) =

Chloe (Original Motion Picture Soundtrack)

Film score by Mychael Danna
- Released: March 23, 2010
- Recorded: 2009–2010
- Studio: Glenn Gould Studio, Toronto
- Genre: Film score
- Length: 43:37
- Label: Silva Screen Records
- Producer: Mychael Danna

Mychael Danna chronology
The Imaginarium of Doctor Parnassus (2009)	Chloe (2010)	Going the Distance (2010)

Chloe (Original Motion Picture Soundtrack) is the film score to the 2009 film Chloe directed by Atom Egoyan and starring Julianne Moore, Liam Neeson, and Amanda Seyfried. The film score is composed by Mychael Danna and released through Silva Screen Records on March 23, 2010.

== Background ==
Mychael Danna composed the film score for Chloe continuing his two-decade-old association with Egoyan that began with Family Viewing (1987). Egoyan wanted the music to feel like really rhapsodic, lush and then turn on itself to become more discordant. He felt the music had to understanding the characters' psychology and their obsession. Danna used operatic themes to highlight the characters' unusual romance, with Richard Wagner's 1865s opera Tristan und Isolde serving as a foundation to the score. Egoyan's sister Eve played classical piano on the score.

== Reception ==
Graham Killeen of Milwaukee Journal Sentinel stated "A wonderfully overwrought score by Mychael Danna, who also composed music for The Ice Storm, transforms Chloe into the kind of romance novel Ang Lee might have written, with pleasures both guilty and otherwise."

Dana Stevens of Slate wrote, "Mychael Danna’s intrusive score [instructs] us how to feel in virtually every moment of every scene." Anthony Lane of The New Yorker wrote, "Even the throbbing score, by Mychael Danna, sounds unwittingly risible". A. O. Scott of The New York Times called it an "engorged musical score". Allan Hunter of Screen International called it a "lush, Bernard Herrman-style score". Todd McCarthy of Variety called the score "intense". John Nugent of WhatCulture wrote, "Composer Mychael Danna dips into stock thriller music in a valiant effort to make everything seem exciting, but it's at direct odds with the definitively unexciting action".

== Track listing ==
No.	Title	Length
1.	"In My Line Of Business"	02:16
2.	"People Like You"	00:58
3.	"Chardonnay"	05:05
4.	"When Did We Stop"	02:10
5.	"I Felt Him"	02:19
6.	"Shower"	02:16
7.	"You Look Just Like Her"	01:27
8.	"Windsor Arms"	03:06
9.	"The First Time"	01:21
10.	"Conservatory"	02:16
11.	"Touch You"	02:54
12.	"Have This"	01:17
13.	"Waiting Room"	02:08
14.	"Do You Want To Count It"	00:48
15.	"Don't Want This To Be Over"	00:59
16.	"Told You Not To Call"	01:31
17.	"She Was Nobody"	01:12
18.	"This Person"	01:41
19.	"Your Parent's Room"	07:53
Total length:		43:37

== Personnel ==
Credits adapted from liner notes:

- Music composer, producer, guitar – Mychael Danna
- Bansuri – Jeetu
- Piano – Eve Egoyan
- Orchestration – Mychael Danna, Nicholas Dodd
- Conductor – Nicholas Dodd
- Contractor – Lenny Solomon
- Coordinator – Pete Compton
- Engineer – Alain Derbez, Chris Jackson, Ian Theriault
- Recording – Alain Derbez, Chris Jackson
- Mixing – Dennis Patterson
- Mastering – Stephen Marsh
- Musical assistance – Javed Ali
- Executive producer – David Stoner, Reynold D'Silva
- Copyist – Dan Parr
- Artwork – Damien Doherty
