= Roald Dahl Funny Prize =

Defunct literary prize

The Roald Dahl Funny Prize, established in 2008, was a literary award for humorous children's books. The prize, sponsored by the Dahl estate, honored British writer and poet Roald Dahl (1916–1990). Winners received an award of £2,500.

The prize was paused in 2014, then officially cancelled in 2015.

== Recipients ==
=== Funniest Book for Children Aged Six and Under ===
Prize winners and finalists
Year	Author	Illustrator	Title	Result	Ref.
2008	Ursula Jones	Russell Ayto	The Witch's Children Go to School	Winner	
2008	Julia Donaldson	Axel Scheffler	Stick Man	Finalist	
2008	Nick Sharratt		Elephant Wellyphant	Finalist	
2008	Oliver Jeffers		The Great Paper Caper	Finalist	
2008	Jeanne Willis	Garry Parsons	There's an Ouch in My Pouch!	Finalist	
2008	John Fardell		Manfred the Baddie	Finalist	
2009	Sam Lloyd		Mr. Pusskins Best in Show	Winner	
2009	Peter Bently	Mei Matsuoka	The Great Dog Bottom Swap	Finalist	
2009	Nick Sharratt		Octopus Socktopus	Finalist	
2009	David Wojtowycz		Elephant Joe Is a Spaceman!	Finalist	
2009	Sean Taylor	Hannah Shaw	Crocodiles Are the Best Animals of All!	Finalist	
2009	Allan Ahlberg	Bruce Ingman	The Pencil	Finalist	
2010	Louise Yates		Dog Loves Books	Winner	
2010	Quentin Blake		Angelica Sprocket's Pockets	Finalist	
2010	Anna Kemp	Sara Ogilvie	Dogs Don't Do Ballet	Finalist	
2010	Jeanne Willis	Tony Ross	The Nanny Goat's Kid	Finalist	
2010	Chris Wormell		One Smart Fish	Finalist	
2010	Lee Weatherly	Algy Craig Hall	The Scariest Monster in the World	Finalist	
2011	Peter Bently	Jim Field	Cats Ahoy!	Winner	
2011	Ed Vere		Bedtime for Monsters	Finalist	
2011	Andy Cutbill	Russell Ayto	First Week at Cow School	Finalist	
2011	Leigh Hodgkinson		Limelight Larry	Finalist	
2011	David Mackintosh		Marshall Armstrong Is New to Our School	Finalist	
2011	Alexis Deacon	Viviane Schwarz	A Place to Call Home	Finalist	
2012	Jamie Thomson	Freya Hartas	Dark Lord: Teenage Years	Winner	
2012	Frank Cottrell-Boyce	Joe Berger	Chitty Chitty Bang Bang Flies Again	Finalist	
2012	Josh Lacey	Garry Parsons	The Dragonsitter	Finalist	
2012	David Walliams	Tony Ross	Gangsta Granny	Finalist	
2012	Philip Reeve	Dave Semple	Goblins	Finalist	
2012	Mark Lowery		Socks are Not Enough	Finalist	
2013	Simon Rickerty		Monkey Nut	Winner	
2013	Elys Dolan		Weasels	Finalist	
2013	Charlotte Guillain Adam	Lee Wildish	Spaghetti With the Yeti	Finalist	
2013	Leigh Hodgkinson		Troll Swap	Finalist	
2013	Amy Sparkes	Sara Oglivie	Do Not Enter the Monster Zoo	Finalist	
2013	Sam Taplin	Mark Chambers	Noisy Bottoms	Finalist	

=== Funniest Book for Children Aged Seven to Fourteen ===
Prize winners and finalists
Year	Author	Title	Result	Ref.
2008	Andy Stanton, illustrated by David Tazzyman	Mr Gum and the Dancing Bear	Winner	
2008	Michael Bond, illustrated by R. W. Alley	Paddington Here and Now	Finalist	
2008	Louise Rennison	Stop in the Name of Pants!	Finalist	
2008	Frank Cottrell-Boyce	Cosmic	Finalist	
2008	Dinah Capparucci	Aliens Don't Eat Dog Food	Finalist	
2008	Kjartan Poskitt, illustrated by Philip Reeve	Urgum and the Goo Goo Bah!	Finalist	
2009	Philip Ardagh	Grubtown Tales: Stinking Rich and Just Plain Stinky	Winner	
2009	Hilda Offen	The Galloping Ghost	Finalist	
2009	Anne Fine, illustrated by Kate Aldous	Eating Things on Sticks	Finalist	
2009	Philip Ardagh, illustrated by Jim Paillot	Grubtown Tales: Stinking Rich and Just Plain Stinky	Finalist	
2009	David Walliams, illustrated by Quentin Blake	The Boy in the Dress	Finalist	
2009	Sean Taylor, illustrated by Helen Bate	Purple Class and the Half-Eaten Sweater	Finalist	
2009	Andy Mulligan	Ribblestrop	Finalist	
2010	Louise Rennison	Withering Tights	Winner	
2010	Sorrel Anderson, illustrated by Nicola Slater	The Clumsies Make a Mess	Finalist	
2010	Anthony McGowan	Einstein's Underpants and How They Saved the World	Finalist	
2010	Jamie Rix, illustrated by Craig Shuttlewood	The Incredible Luck of Alfie Pluck	Finalist	
2010	David Walliams, illustrated by Quentin Blake	Mr Stink	Finalist	
2010	Eva Ibbotson	The Ogre of Oglefort	Finalist	
2011	Liz Pichon	The Brilliant World of Tom Gates	Winner	
2011	Terry Jones, illustrated by Michael Foreman	Animal Tales	Finalist	
2011	Rose Impey	The Get Rich Quick Club	Finalist	
2011	Ros Asquith	Letters from an Alien Schoolboy	Finalist	
2011	Joanna Nadin, illustrated by Jess Mikhail	Penny Dreadful is a Magnet for Disaster	Finalist	
2011	Steven Butler, illustrated by Chris Fisher	The Wrong Pong	Finalist	
2012	Rebecca Patterson	My Big Shouting Day	Winner	
2012	Simon Puttock, illustrated by Nadia Shireen	The Baby that Roared	Finalist	
2012	Chris Haughton	Oh No, George!	Finalist	
2012	Jonny Duddle	The Pirates Next Door	Finalist	
2012	Oliver Jeffers	Stuck	Finalist	
2012	Anna Kemp, illustrated by Sara Ogilvie	The Worst Princess	Finalist	
2013	Jim Smith	I Am Still Not a Loser	Winner	
2013	Philip Ardagh, illustrated by Axel Scheffler	The Grunts All At Sea	Finalist	
2013	Pete Johnson	My Parents Are Out of Control	Finalist	
2013	Mark Lowery	Pants Are Everything	Finalist	
2013	Holly Smale	Geek Girl	Finalist	
2013	Jamie Smart	Fish-Head Steve!	Finalist	
