= Dancing in my Nuddy-Pants =

2002 children's book by Louise Rennison

Dancing in My Nuddy-Pants!
- First edition
- Author: Louise Rennison
- Cover artist: Ian Bilbey
- Language: English
- Series: Confessions of Georgia Nicolson
- Genre: YA romance
- Publisher: Piccadilly Press
- Publication date: 2002
- Publication place: Great Britain
- Media type: Print (Paperback)
- Pages: 212
- ISBN: 978-0-00-721870-7
- Preceded by: Knocked Out by my Nunga-Nungas
- Followed by: ...And That's When It Fell Off in My Hand

Dancing in my Nuddy-Pants! is a young adult romance novel by British author Louise Rennison. It is the fourth book in the Georgia Nicolson series. The book was first published in Great Britain by Piccadilly Press in 2002, and by HarperCollins in the United States in 2003. It was also released as an audiobook by Recorded Books.

== Plot ==
The book is written in the form of a diary. It is about 14-year-old Georgia Nicolson, her friends (the Ace Gang), and her infatuation with boys (or snogging in particular). Georgia's boyfriend Robbie (nicknamed "the sex god or SG") has been invited to go on tour with his band The Stiff Dylans. He has received an offer to go to Los Angeles in what Georgia calls "hamburger-a-gogo-land" (the United States), where she is thinking of becoming a "girlfriend to a pop-star". At the end of the book he goes for an interview and gets a job in Whakatāne, New Zealand, instead. Even though Georgia is upset about this, she still has enough courage in her to dance naked, or in her "nuddy-pants" as she refers to it, when her house is empty.

== Success ==
The work was preordered by roughly 80,000 readers and hit number one on the New York Times bestseller list, in the children's Books list in March 2003.
