= Withering Tights =

2010 book by Louise Rennison

Withering Tights: Misadventures of Tallulah Casey
- Book one of the series
- Author: Louise Rennison
- Language: English
- Publisher: CollinsFlamingo
- Publication date: 2010
- ISBN: 978-0-00-715682-5

Withering Tights is the first in a series of books written by Louise Rennison called The Misadventures Of Tallulah Casey. The books are published by HarperCollins. It was first published in the United Kingdom in 2010, and in the United States in 2011.

It was published as an audiobook by Brilliance Audio, read by Louise Rennison.

The book was awarded a Roald Dahl Funny Prize in 2010.

== Plot ==
Tallulah Casey, a lanky girl worried about her knees and underdeveloped cleavage, is off to stay at a drama performance workshop centre in Yorkshire called Dother Hall. There she meets the Tree Sisters (Flossie, Vaisey, Honey and Jo). Together they all go through boys, snogging and bad acting. Will Tallulah stay for another term? Will she get the boy of her dreams? And will it be Alex, the older brother of her friend Ruby, Charlie, the perfect guy who loves her knobbly knees, despite the fact he has a girlfriend, or evil Cain, lead singer of the local band, who doesn't seem to realise that Tallulah's nose is not an ice cream?
