= Stiff Dylans =

British rock band

- Origin: England
- Genres: Pop rock, Pop punk
- Years active: 2008
- Label: Columbia Records
- Past members: James Flannigan; Matt Harris; Charlie Wride; Tom Slaytor

The Stiff Dylans were a British rock band.

== History ==
The Stiff Dylans found fame after being featured in Gurinder Chadha's 2008 Paramount Pictures film Angus, Thongs and Perfect Snogging and performing several songs on the soundtrack.

The band was composed of James Flannigan (vocals and guitar), Matt Harris (bass and vocals), Charlie Wride (guitar) and Tom Slaytor (drums), with members having previously studied at the Brighton Institute of Modern Music and the Academy of Contemporary Music in Guildford. The members auditioned to join the band, which also featured actor Aaron Taylor-Johnson on bass guitar in the film. They had two songs that charted in the UK in 2008: "Ultraviolet" (the main theme from the film, and a cover of an Annetenna song), which reached number 41, and "Ever Fallen in Love", a cover version of the Buzzcocks song, which reached number 93. They did not release another single.

In 2008, the band went on a nationwide tour from September to December.

Plans for an album fell through and the band has been inactive ever since. Lead singer James Flannigan has gone to become a songwriter for several artists.

== Members ==
- James Flannigan – vocals, guitars
- Charlie Wride – guitar, backing vocals
- Matt Harris – bass, backing vocals
- Thomas Slaytor – drums

== Discography ==
=== Singles ===
List of singles, with selected chart positions
Title	Year	Peak chart positions	
Title	Year	UK	AUS
"Ultraviolet"	2008	41	78
"Ever Fallen in Love"	2008	93	—

=== Other songs ===
- "Out of Time"
- "Big Fan"
- "Stars Collide"
- "Cinderella"
- "Rock Night"
- "Standing Water"
- "Misery"
- "Super Hot"
- "The Cabbage Song"
