= Ray Shirley =

American actress

- Occupation: Actress

Ray Shirley (born ?) is an American actress.

== Career ==
Ray Shirley appeared in the 2008 film Angus, Thongs and Perfect Snogging as Woman with the Poodle.

Shirley co-stars in the 2012 film Dark Shadows as Mrs. Johnson, the manor's elderly maid. Dark Shadows, which stars Johnny Depp, was directed by Tim Burton.

== Filmography ==
Film
Year	Film	Role	Notes
2008	Angus, Thongs and Perfect Snogging	Woman with the Poodle	
2012	Dark Shadows	Mrs. Johnson	
