= What Would Steve Do? =

Single by Mumm-Ra

from the album These Things Move in Threes
- Released: April 2006; February 2007
- Genre: Indie rock
- Length: 2:52
- Label: Columbia
- Songwriter: Mumm-Ra
- Producer: Youth

Mumm-Ra singles chronology
| "Out of the Question" (2006) | "What Would Steve Do?" (2006) | "She's Got You High" (2007) |

"What Would Steve Do?" is the second single released by Mumm-Ra on Columbia Records, which was released on February 19, 2007. It is a re-recorded version of the self-release they did in April 2006. It reached #40 in the UK Singles Chart, making it their highest charting single.

== Track listings ==
All songs written by Mumm-Ra.

CD

1. "What Would Steve Do?"
2. "Cute As"
3. "Without You"

7"

1. "What Would Steve Do?"
2. "What Would Steve Do? (Floorboard Mix)"

Gatefold 7"

1. "What Would Steve Do?"
2. "Cute As"

== Charts ==
Weekly chart performance for "What Would Steve Do?"
| Chart (2007) | Peak position |
|---|---|
| UK Singles (OCC) | 40 |
