= These Things Move in Threes =

Studio album by Mumm-Ra
- Released: May 28, 2007
- Studio: Carman Recording Studio, Granada, Spain; Olympic Studios, Barnes, London
- Genre: Indie rock, alternative rock, post-punk revival
- Label: Columbia
- Producer: Youth

Mumm-Ra chronology
Black Hurts Day and the Night Rolls On (2006)	These Things Move in Threes (2007)	Back to the Shore (2014)

Singles from These Things Move In Threes
- 1. "Out of the Question" Released: October 2006; 2. "What Would Steve Do?" Released: February 2007; 3. "She's Got You High" Released: August 2007

Professional ratings
Review scores
Source	Rating
Rocklouder	link
NME	link
indielondon	link
LeedsMusicScene	link
musicOHM	link
Clickmusic	link
inthenews	link
Choon	link
AllMusic	link

These Things Move in Threes is the first album from indie rock band Mumm-Ra, released on 28 May 2007, and leaked onto the internet on the 17 May. Before the release of the album, three songs were taken as singles, whilst "Song B" was released on the EP, Black Hurts Day and the Night Rolls On, and had a music video created.

== Track listing ==
All tracks composed by Mumm-Ra

1. "Now or Never"
2. "Out of the Question"
3. "These Things Move in Threes"
4. "She's Got You High"
5. "Song B"
6. "The Sick Deal"
7. "Light Up This Room"
8. "Starlight"
9. "This Is Easy"
10. "What Would Steve Do?"
11. "Down Down Down"

== B-sides ==
From Out of the Question

1. "Clocks Tick Louder at the Dead of Night"
2. "When the Lights Go Out"
3. "In Between Days" (cover of The Cure)

From What Would Steve Do?

1. "Cute As"
2. "Without You"
3. "What Would Steve Do?" (Floorboard Mix)

From She's Got You High

1. "Indiscrete"
2. "Song E"
3. "Out of the Question" (live)
4. "There She Is" (acoustic)

== Personnel ==
Mumm-Ra

- James "Tate" Arguile - guitar
- Niall Buckler - bass, vocals
- James "Noo" New - lead vocals, backing guitar, keyboards
- Oli Frost - guitar, vocals
- Gareth "the Rock" Jennings - drums
- Tommy "B" Bowen - keyboards

with:

- The London Session Orchestra - strings on "The Sick Deal"
- Wil Malone - string arrangement

Technical

- Clive Goddard - engineer
- James Taylor - art direction, cover illustration
