= The Time Traveler's Wife (soundtrack) =

The Time Traveler's Wife (Music from the Motion Picture)

Soundtrack album by Mychael Danna
- Released: August 11, 2009
- Recorded: December 2008
- Studios: Ocean Way Recording, Hollywood, Los Angeles
- Genres: Film score; film soundtrack
- Length: 55:02
- Label: New Line Records
- Producer: Mychael Danna

Mychael Danna chronology
| 500 Days of Summer (2009) | The Time Traveler's Wife (2009) | The Imaginarium of Doctor Parnassus (2009) |

The Time Traveler's Wife (Music from the Motion Picture) is the soundtrack album to the 2009 film The Time Traveler's Wife directed by Robert Schwentke starring Eric Bana and Rachel McAdams. The album features three songs along with an original score composed by Mychael Danna. The album released through New Line Records on August 11, 2009.

== Background ==
The score to The Time Traveler's Wife was composed by Mychael Danna, who recorded his score with the Hollywood Studio Symphony at the Ocean Way Studios during the fall of 2008. The score was performed by the 50-piece orchestra from the Hollywood Studio Symphony conducted and orchestrated by Nicholas Dodd and featured strings, woodwinds, piano and pre-recorded chimes.

The film repeatedly features the musical theme of an old German hymn, "Es ist ein Ros entsprungen", whose familiar harmonization was written by German composer Michael Praetorius. This is heard just prior to the early car accident, is played at holiday gatherings, and is otherwise interwoven into the score. The trailer featured the song "Broken", by Lifehouse, which is in the film and the promotional music video. A television commercial for the film featured the song "Show Me What I'm Looking For", by Carolina Liar, although it was not included in the soundtrack. The film also features a cover of Joy Division's "Love Will Tear Us Apart", performed by Canadian indie rock band Broken Social Scene.

The official motion picture soundtrack was released as a download on August 11, 2009, by New Line Records. A CD version was released by Decca Records, but is generally only available from vendors outside the United States.

== Reception ==
Christian Clemmensen of Filmtracks wrote "Ultimately, Danna's work for The Time Traveler's Wife comes excruciatingly close to earning a four-star rating, but its detached character (possibly by necessity) and unrealized thematic development make it among the best three-star scores you will hear. Just make sure you amplify it, because otherwise it will pass you by without as much as a single jolt to stir you from your slumber." William Ruhlmann of AllMusic wrote "Mychael Danna's score for the film zeroes in on the romance and the conflict caused by Henry's constant disappearances. This is calm, sweet music, full of slow, considered piano parts supported by warm strings, at least a first. Things get a little more ominous as the music continues, however, with a sense of anxiety signaled by odd sound effects and bits of atonality."

Jonathan Broxton of Movie Music UK wrote "Anyone who has limited experience of Danna's music, or who has been unwilling to take the plunge into his filmography due to the perceived "unusual" nature of his work, may find The Time Traveler's Wife a perfect place to start. It is approachable and thematic enough to give those who have more conservative tastes something to appreciate, while simultaneously allowing some of the more experimental techniques to be introduced. Similarly, it also gives those who already known and appreciate Danna's work a long-awaited look at his more classically emotional side; it is from this angle that I approach this score, and why I like it so much."

Lauren Kalal of Fandomania wrote "Much like the film adaptation, the music from The Time Traveler's Wife creates a beautiful, melancholy story that is haunting, easy to digest, and even easier to forget." Kirk Honeycutt of The Hollywood Reporter wrote "Mychael Danna's score sometimes emphasizes its melancholy nature."

== Track listing ==
All music is composed by Mychael Danna except where noted.

The Time Traveler's Wife (Music From the Motion Picture)
| No. | Title | Writer(s) | Original artist(s) | Length |
|---|---|---|---|---|
| 1. | "Es ist ein Ros entsprungen" (performed by Isabel Bayrakdarian) | Anonymous | | 0:51 |
| 2. | "I'm You Henry" | | | 2:30 |
| 3. | "Meadow" | | | 3:19 |
| 4. | "How Does It Feel?" | | | 1:59 |
| 5. | "Diary" | | | 1:21 |
| 6. | "Train" | | | 1:43 |
| 7. | "I Don't Feel Alone Anymore" | | | 2:22 |
| 8. | "Love Will Tear Us Apart" | Ian Curtis; Peter Hook; Stephen Morris; Bernard Sumner | Broken Social Scene | 4:44 |
| 9. | "Married to Me" | | | 1:04 |
| 10. | "Home" | | | 1:36 |
| 11. | "Do You Know When?" | | | 2:09 |
| 12. | "Testing" | | | 1:04 |
| 13. | "Alba" | | | 2:33 |
| 14. | "I Never Had a Choice" | | | 2:58 |
| 15. | "Who Would Want That" | | | 2:29 |
| 16. | "I Left Him Sleeping" | | | 1:30 |
| 17. | "It's a Girl" | | | 2:58 |
| 18. | "Five Years" | | | 2:03 |
| 19. | "Try to Stay" | | | 1:40 |
| 20. | "New Year's Eve" | | | 1:55 |
| 21. | "No Tracks in the Snow" | | | 1:48 |
| 22. | "See You Again" | | | 5:42 |
| 23. | "Broken" | Jason Wade | Lifehouse | 4:47 |
| Total length: | | | | 55:02 |

== Additional songs ==
The film had three songs not included in the release of the soundtrack:

- "Show Me What I'm Looking For" – Performed by Carolina Liar – 4:00
- "Clocks" – Performed by Coldplay – 5:07
- "Gone to Earth" – Performed by The American Analog Set – 3:13

== Personnel ==
Credits adapted from liner notes:

- Music composer and producer – Mychael Danna
- Additional music – Amritha Fernandes-Bakshi
- Engineer – Rouble Kapoor
- Recording – Brad Haehnel, Dennis Patterson, Ron Searles,
- Recording assistance – Alain Derbez
- Mixing – Brad Haehnel
- Mixing assistance – Brendan Dekora
- Mastering – Stephen Marsh
- Music editor – Richard Ford
- Music supervisor – Bob Bowen
- Music preparation – Joann Kane Music Service, Mark Graham
- Art direction – Sandeep Sriram
- Executive in charge of music for New Line Cinema – Erin Scully
- Executive in charge of New Line Records – Jason Linn
- Music business affairs executives – Keith Zajic, Lori Blackstone

Orchestra

- Orchestra – The Hollywood Studio Symphony
- Orchestrator – Nicholas Dodd, Mychael Danna
- Conductor – Nicholas Dodd
- Orchestra contractor – Gina Zimmitti
- Assistant orchestra contractor – Chrissy Brantley

Instruments

- Bass – Bruce Morgenthaler, Chris Kollgaard, Drew Dembowski, Ed Meares, Oscar Hidalgo, Sue Ranney
- Cello – Andrew Shulman, Cecilia Tsan, Dana Little, Dennis Karmazyn, Erika Duke, Giovanna Clayton, Larry Corbett, Paul Cohen, Paula Hochhalter, Roger Lebow, Steve Erdody, Tim Landauer
- Clarinet – Stuart Clark
- Guitar, electronics – Mychael Danna
- Flute – Heather Clark
- Harp – Katie Kirkpatrick
- Oboe – Leslie Reed
- Piano – Robert Thies
- Viola – Alma Fernandez, Brian Dembow, David Walther, Matt Funes, Shawn Mann, Thomas Diener
- Violin – Alyssa Park, Ana Landauer, Bruce Dukov, Darius Campo, Eric Hosler, Irina Voloshina, Jennifer Levin, Joel Derouin, Josefina Vergara, Julie Gigante, Julie Rogers, Katia Popov, Kevin Connolly, Liane Mautner, Marc Sazer, Natalie Leggett, Phillip Levy, Razdan Kujumjian, Roberto Cani, Roger Wilkie, Sara Parkins, Sid Page, Tammy Hatwan, Tereza Stanislav
- Voice – Isabel Bayrakdarian

== Accolades ==
| Awards | Category | Recipient(s) | Result | Ref. |
|---|---|---|---|---|
| BMI Film & TV Awards | Film Music Award | Mychael Danna | Won | |
