= Dark Shadows (film) =

2012 film by Tim Burton

- Theatrical release poster
- Directed by: Tim Burton
- Screenplay by: Seth Grahame-Smith
- Story by: John August; Seth Grahame-Smith
- Based on: Dark Shadows by Dan Curtis
- Produced by: Richard D. Zanuck; Graham King; Johnny Depp; Christi Dembrowski; David Kennedy
- Starring: Johnny Depp; Michelle Pfeiffer; Helena Bonham Carter; Eva Green; Jackie Earle Haley; Jonny Lee Miller; Chloë Grace Moretz; Bella Heathcote
- Cinematography: Bruno Delbonnel
- Edited by: Chris Lebenzon
- Music by: Danny Elfman
- Production companies: Warner Bros. Pictures; Village Roadshow Pictures; Infinitum Nihil; GK Films; The Zanuck Company
- Distributed by: Warner Bros. Pictures (United States); Roadshow Entertainment (Australia)
- Release dates: May 7, 2012 (Los Angeles premiere); May 10, 2012 (Australia); May 11, 2012 (United States)
- Running time: 114 minutes
- Countries: United States; Australia
- Language: English
- Budget: $150 million
- Box office: $245.5 million

Dark Shadows is a 2012 Gothic horror comedy film based on the Gothic television soap opera of the same name. Directed by Tim Burton, the film stars Johnny Depp alongside Michelle Pfeiffer, Eva Green, Jackie Earle Haley, Jonny Lee Miller, Chloë Grace Moretz, Helena Bonham Carter, and Bella Heathcote in a dual role. Christopher Lee has a small role in the film, marking his 200th film appearance and his fifth and final collaboration with Burton. Jonathan Frid, star of the original Dark Shadows series, makes a cameo appearance, and died shortly before the film was released. One of the film's producers, Richard D. Zanuck, died two months after its release. As of 2026, it is also Burton's last movie with frequent collaborators Johnny Depp and Helena Bonham Carter.

The film had a limited release on May 10, 2012, and was officially released the following day in North America. It performed poorly at the United States box office, but did well in foreign markets. Reviews for the film were mixed; critics praised its visual style and consistent humor, but felt it lacked a focused or substantial plot and developed characters.

== Plot ==
In 1760, a young Barnabas Collins and his wealthy family emigrated from Liverpool to Maine to expand their family’s empire in the fishing industry, where they established the town of Collinsport and constructed the Collinwood Mansion. Sixteen years later, Barnabas is engaged to Josette. He had been having an affair with family servant Angelique, but he refuses any further advances from Angelique and breaks off their relationship.

Enraged, Angelique, secretly a witch, murders his parents using magic and curses Barnabas. She then casts a spell on Josette, making her jump to her death from the cliff called Widows' Hill. A distraught Barnabas attempts to fall to his death but fails, discovering that Angelique's curse has transformed him into a vampire. She rallies the town against him, and Barnabas is buried alive in a hidden tomb.

In 1972, Maggie Evans, under the alias Victoria Winters, is hired as governess for the Collins family, now consisting of matriarch Elizabeth, her teenage daughter Carolyn, Elizabeth's younger brother Roger, and his young son David, who believes he is being visited by his late mother's ghost, and a live-in alcoholic psychiatrist, Dr. Julia Hoffman. Meanwhile, a construction crew unwittingly frees Barnabas from his tomb and he drinks their blood to restore himself.

At Collinwood, Barnabas hypnotizes the caretaker, Willie, to become his familiar, and reveals to Elizabeth that the family curse is true. He asks to rejoin the family and shows her the manor's secret passages and hidden treasure. He is taken by Victoria’s strong resemblance to Josette. Meanwhile, an older Angelique has displaced the Collins family fishing business by starting her own company, Angel Bay Seafood. Once discovering that Barnabas has escaped, she goes to Collinwood to confront him, reminding him of her powers and popularity within the town before she leaves.

While adjusting to modern life and falling for Victoria, Barnabas uses his powers and the family treasure to restore his family's finances. Dr. Hoffman learns of his true nature while he is under hypnosis and offers to try to turn him mortal by removing his corrupted blood and giving him transfusions of human blood. Angelique arranges another meeting with Barnabas. She begs him to love her back, but after having supernatural intercourse with her, he refuses. She vows to destroy his family and Victoria.

Barnabas hosts a "happening" at Collinwood for the entire town. He talks with Victoria, who reveals she has been seeing Josette's ghost her whole life. When her parents assumed she was delusional, they committed her to an asylum for it. However, she eventually escaped, and Josette directed her to Collinwood. Determined to be human again, Barnabas goes to Dr. Hoffman's office, where he discovers that she deceived him to turn herself into a vampire and avoid death from old age. Barnabas kills her, and he and Willie dump her body at sea.

After catching Roger attempting to break into the secret passage that leads to the hidden fortune, Barnabas confronts him, offering him a choice: become the loving father David deserves or leave Collinwood with financial gain; Roger chooses the latter. Heartbroken, David is nearly struck by a falling disco ball, but Barnabas saves him before catching fire in the daylight, revealing himself as a vampire to the whole family and Victoria.

Believing they will never accept him, Barnabas meets with Angelique, who goads him into confessing to his murders and demands he join her as her paramour. He again refuses, so she again traps him in a coffin. Angelique destroys the Collins' cannery and, with a recording of Barnabas' confession, rallies the town to storm Collinwood Manor.

David frees Barnabas, who confronts Angelique at Collinwood. They battle, and the townspeople learn that she is a witch. Carolyn, who is revealed to be a werewolf, joins the fight, and Angelique uses her enchantments to subdue them, damage the house and start fires.

Angelique admits she was responsible for the werewolf that bit Carolyn as an infant and for the death of David's mother. Her ghost appears and incapacitates the witch, and the family escapes the burning manor. Angelique offers Barnabas her heart, but he refuses; she then crumbles into dust.

Barnabas races to Widows' Hill and finds Victoria, who says she has to be a vampire if they are to be together. When Barnabas insists that he could not do that to her, she falls off the cliff. Barnabas leaps after her, biting her neck. Now a vampire, she awakens as Josette, with his curse lifted. Meanwhile, Dr. Hoffman, bound and on the sea floor, is resurrected by Barnabas' blood and becomes a vampire.

== Cast ==
- Johnny Depp as Barnabas Collins, an 18th-century vampire who awakens in 1972
  - Justin Tracy as young Barnabas
- Michelle Pfeiffer as Elizabeth Collins Stoddard, the family matriarch
- Helena Bonham Carter as Dr. Julia Hoffman, the family's vain and often inebriated live-in psychiatrist, who was hired to treat David's trauma over his mother's death
- Eva Green as Angelique "Angie" Bouchard, a vengeful witch who plots a vendetta against Barnabas and his family. She is still alive in the 20th century, having posed as five successive generations of women who own a seafood business called Angel Bay, which has outcompeted the Collins family business. Her face and body begin to crack during the latter part of the film, resembling a porcelain doll.
  - Raffey Cassidy as young Angelique
- Jackie Earle Haley as Willie Loomis, caretaker of Collinwood Mansion
- Jonny Lee Miller as Roger Collins, Elizabeth's younger ne'er-do-well brother
- Chloë Grace Moretz as Carolyn Stoddard, Elizabeth's rebellious 15-year-old daughter, who is later revealed to be a werewolf
- Bella Heathcote as Victoria Winters / Josette du Pres. Heathcote plays both Josette, Barnabas' 18th-century love, and Victoria, David's governess and Barnabas' 20th-century love-interest. In the end of the film she becomes Josette and a vampiress when Barnabas bites her on the neck as they fall off the cliff. Victoria and Maggie Evans' roles from the original series were combined for the film, and, in her first scene in the film, Maggie adopts the alias of "Victoria Winters", inspired by a poster on the train to Collinsport advertising winter sports in Victoria, British Columbia.
  - Alexia Osborne as young Victoria
- Gully McGrath as David Collins, Roger's precocious 10-year-old son, who is regularly visited by the ghost of his dead mother
- Alice Cooper as himself
- Ray Shirley as Mrs. Sarah Johnson, Collinwood's elderly maid who is oblivious to Barnabas' nature
- Christopher Lee as Silas Clarney, a "king of the fishermen who spends a lot of time in the local pub, The Blue Whale"
- Ivan Kaye as Joshua Collins, the father of Barnabas Collins
- Susanna Cappellaro as Naomi Collins, the mother of Barnabas Collins
- Josephine Butler as Laura Collins, David's mother, whose ghost has been appearing to her son since she drowned in a shipwreck caused by Angelique
- William Hope as Sheriff Bill (credited as Sheriff), the sheriff of Collinsport
- Shane Rimmer as board member 1
- Guy Flanagan as bearded hippie
- Sophie Kennedy Clark as hippie chick 1
- Hannah Murray as hippie chick 2
- Jonathan Frid as guest 1

At the 2011 San Diego Comic-Con, it was confirmed that four actors from the original series would appear in the film. In June 2011, Jonathan Frid, Kathryn Leigh Scott, Lara Parker, and David Selby all spent three days at Pinewood Studios to film cameo appearances. They all appeared as guests during the ball held at Collinwood Manor and can be seen arriving as a group. Frid died in April 2012, making this his final film appearance.

== Production ==
In July 2007, Warner Bros. Pictures acquired film rights for the Gothic soap opera Dark Shadows from the estate of its creator, Dan Curtis. Johnny Depp had a childhood obsession with Dark Shadows, calling it a "dream" to portray Barnabas Collins, and ended up persuading Tim Burton to direct. The project's development was delayed by the 2007–2008 Writers Guild of America strike. After the strike was resolved, Burton was attached to direct the film.

By 2009, screenwriter John August was writing a screenplay for Dark Shadows. In 2010, author and screenwriter Seth Grahame-Smith replaced August, but, on the finished film, August did receive story credit with Smith for his contributions to the film.

Filming began in May 2011. Production took place entirely in England, at both Pinewood Studios and on location. Depp attempted to emulate the "rigidity" and "elegance" of Jonathan Frid's original portrayal, but also drew inspiration from Max Schreck's performance in Nosferatu.

A number of Burton's frequent collaborators worked on the film's crew, among them production designer Rick Heinrichs, costume designer Colleen Atwood, editor and executive producer Chris Lebenzon, and composer Danny Elfman. French cinematographer Bruno Delbonnel—known for his work in Amélie, A Very Long Engagement and Harry Potter and the Half-Blood Prince—also worked on the project.

== Music ==
=== Score ===
The film was scored by long-time Burton collaborator Danny Elfman. An album featuring 21 tracks of compositions from the film by Elfman was released on May 8, 2012.

==== Track listing ====
Dark Shadows: Original Score
No.	Title	Length
1.	"Dark Shadows Prologue" (Uncut)	7:52
2.	"Resurrection"	2:54
3.	"Vicki Enters Collinwood"	1:21
4.	"Deadly Handshake"	2:14
5.	"Shadows (Reprise)"	1:08
6.	"Is It Her?"	0:43
7.	"Barnabas Comes Home"	4:18
8.	"Vicki's Nightmare"	1:26
9.	"Hypno Music"	0:47
10.	"Killing Dr. Hoffman"	1:14
11.	"Dumping the Body"	0:58
12.	"Roger Departs"	2:33
13.	"Burn Baby Burn / In-Tombed"	2:49
14.	"Lava Lamp"	2:17
15.	"The Angry Mob"	4:40
16.	"House of Blood"	3:38
17.	"Final Confrontation"	2:20
18.	"Widows' Hill (Finale)"	3:47
19.	"The End?" (Uncut)	2:42
20.	"More the End?"	1:55
21.	"We Will End You!"	1:09

=== Soundtrack ===
Dark Shadows: Original Motion Picture Soundtrack

Soundtrack album by Various artists
- Released: May 8, 2012
- Recorded: 1966–2012
- Genres: Progressive rock, psychedelic rock, hard rock, pop, R&B, orchestral
- Length: 44:43
- Labels: WaterTower Music, Sony Music
- Producers: Various, Tim Burton

Dark Shadows music chronology
Dark Shadows: Original Score (2012)	Dark Shadows: Original Motion Picture Soundtrack (2012)

A number of contemporaneous early-1970s rock and pop songs appear in the film, along with others from earlier and slightly later. These include "Nights in White Satin" by The Moody Blues, "I'm Sick of You" by Iggy Pop, "Season of the Witch" by Donovan, "Top of the World" by The Carpenters, "You're the First, the Last, My Everything" by Barry White and "Get It On" by T. Rex. Alice Cooper makes a cameo in the film and sings "No More Mr. Nice Guy" and "Ballad of Dwight Fry". A cover of the Raspberries' song "Go All the Way" by The Killers plays over the end credits.

Dark Shadows: Original Motion Picture Soundtrack was released on May 8, 2012, as a download and on various dates as a CD, such as on May 22 as an import in the United States and on May 25 in Australia. It features 11 songs, among them two score pieces by Danny Elfman and a recitation by Depp as Barnabas of several lines from "The Joker" by Steve Miller Band. Songs not featured on the soundtrack that are in the film include "Superfly" by Curtis Mayfield, "Crocodile Rock" by Elton John, "Paranoid" by Black Sabbath and "Monster" by Skillet.

==== Track listing ====
Included next to each track is the year of the song's original release, excluding the score pieces.

Dark Shadows: Original Motion Picture Soundtrack
No.	Title	Artist	Length
1.	"Nights in White Satin" (1967, re-released 1972)	The Moody Blues	4:26
2.	"Dark Shadows – Prologue"	Danny Elfman	3:56
3.	"I'm Sick of You" (1977)	Iggy Pop	6:52
4.	"Season of the Witch" (1966)	Donovan	4:56
5.	"Top of the World" (1973)	The Carpenters	3:01
6.	"You're the First, the Last, My Everything" (1974)	Barry White	4:35
7.	"Bang a Gong (Get It On)" (1971)	T. Rex	4:26
8.	"No More Mr. Nice Guy" (1973)	Alice Cooper	3:08
9.	"Ballad of Dwight Fry" (1971)	Alice Cooper	6:36
10.	"The End?"	Danny Elfman	2:30
11.	"The Joker" (original song from 1973)	Johnny Depp	0:17

== Reception ==
=== Box office ===
The film grossed $79.7 million in the United States and Canada, and $165.8 million in other territories, for a worldwide total of $245.5 million.

For a Burton film, Dark Shadows achieved below-average domestic box office takings, with many commentators attributing that to the domination of The Avengers. It made $29.7 million in its first weekend, then $12.8 million in its second.

=== Critical response ===
On Rotten Tomatoes, Dark Shadows holds an approval rating of 35% based on 259 reviews, with an average rating of 5.30/10; the site's critical consensus reads: "The visuals are top notch but Tim Burton never finds a consistent rhythm, mixing campy jokes and gothic spookiness with less success than other Johnny Depp collaborations." On Metacritic, the film has a weighted average score of 55 out of 100, based on 42 critics, indicating "mixed or average" reviews. Audiences polled by CinemaScore gave the film an average grade of "B−" on an A+ to F scale.

Some critics felt the film lacked a focused or consistent plot or genre (as either horror, comedy or drama), pointing to problems with Grahame-Smith's script, and that some jokes fell flat. Some claimed that Burton and Depp's collaborations had become tired. Many of these same critics, however, noted that this film's visual style was impressive.

Positive reviewers, on the other hand, opined that the film successfully translated the mood of the soap opera and that its '70s culture pastiche worked to its advantage. There was also acclaim for the characters and actors, most notably Depp as Barnabas—who several critics said was the stand-out character due to his humorous culture shock—and Pfeiffer.

Roger Ebert gave the film two-and-a-half stars out of four and said: "[The film] offers wonderful things, but they aren't what's important. It's as if Burton directed at arm's length, unwilling to find juice in the story." He went on to note that "Much of the amusement comes from Depp's reactions to 1970s pop culture," and concluded that the film "begins with great promise, but then the energy drains out". Manohla Dargis, in a mostly-positive review written for The New York Times, said that the film "isn't among Mr. Burton's most richly realized works, but it's very enjoyable, visually sumptuous and, despite its lugubrious source material and a sporadic tremor of violence, surprisingly effervescent," and opined that Burton's "gift for deviant beauty and laughter has its own liberating power."

Rolling Stone's Peter Travers gave the film a mixed two-and-a-half stars out of four, claiming that "After a fierce and funny start, Dark Shadows simply spins its wheels," and adding that "the pleasures of Dark Shadows are frustratingly hit-and-miss. In the end, it all collapses into a spectacularly gorgeous heap." In The Washington Post, Ann Hornaday dismissed the film, awarding it just one-and-a-half stars out of four and explaining that "Burton's mash-up of post-'60s kitsch and modern-day knowingness strikes a chord that is less self-aware than fatally self-satisfied. Dark Shadows doesn't know where it wants to dwell: in the eerie, subversive penumbra suggested by its title or in playful, go-for-broke camp."

Richard Corliss of Time pointed out that "[Burton]'s affection is evident, and his homage sometimes acute," and reasoned: "All right, so Burton has made less a revival of the old show than a hit-or-miss parody pageant," but praised the star power of the film, relenting that "attention must be paid to movie allure, in a star like Depp and his current harem. Angelique may be the only demonic among the women here, but they're all bewitching." Peter Bradshaw, in the British newspaper The Guardian, weighed the film in a mixed write-up, giving it three stars out of five, and pointing out his feeling that "the Gothy, jokey 'darkness' of Burton's style is now beginning to look very familiar; he has built his brand to perfection in the film marketplace, and it is smarter and more distinctive than a lot of what is on offer at the multiplex, but there are no surprises. There are shadows, but they conceal nothing."

=== Accolades ===
Award	Category	Recipient	Result	Ref.
Young Artist Award	Best Performance in a Feature Film - Supporting Young Actor	Gully McGrath	Nominated	
Kid's Choice Award	Favorite Movie Actor	Johnny Depp	Won	
Saturn Awards	Best Performance by a Younger Actor	Chloë Grace Moretz	Nominated	
Saturn Awards	Best Production Design	Rick Heinrichs	Nominated	
BMI Film & TV Awards	Best Film Music	Danny Elfman	Won	
British Society of Cinematographers	GBCT Operators Award	Des Whelan	Nominated	
Empire Awards	Best Horror Film		Nominated	
Golden Trailer Awards	Best Animation/Family Poster	Warner Bros. Ignition Creative	Nominated	
Golden Trailer Awards	Best Summer 2012 Blockbuster Poster	Warner Bros. Ignition Creative	Nominated	
Golden Trailer Awards	Best Wildposts	Warner Bros. Ignition Creative	Nominated	
Rondo Hatton Classic Horror Awards	Best Film	Tim Burton	Nominated	
The Operators Award	Feature Film	Des Whelan	Nominated	

== Home media ==
Dark Shadows was released on both Blu-ray and DVD in the United States on October 2, 2012 (the date confirmed by the official Dark Shadows Facebook page and the official Dark Shadows website). It was released on both formats several days earlier in Australia; in stores on September 24, and online on September 26. The film was released on home video in the UK on October 15.

The DVD includes just one featurette, "The Collinses: Every Family Has Its Demons", while the Blu-ray contains a total of nine short featurettes and six deleted scenes. Several worldwide releases of both the DVD and Blu-ray contain an UltraViolet digital copy of the film.

== Possible sequel ==
In December 2011, Pfeiffer told MTV that she was hoping there would be sequels to the film. On May 8, 2012, various tabloids, like Variety, reported that Warner Bros. may have wanted to turn Dark Shadows into a film franchise. On the same day, Collider mentioned that the ending lends itself to a possible sequel. When Burton was asked if he thought this could be a possible start to a franchise, he replied: "No. Because of the nature of it being like a soap opera, that was the structure. It wasn't a conscious decision. First of all, it's a bit presumptuous to think that. If something works out, that's one thing, but you can't ever predict that. [The ending] had more to do with the soap opera structure of it."

== See also ==
- Vampire film – Film genre

There have been two other feature films based on the soap opera Dark Shadows:

- House of Dark Shadows – 1970 film by Dan Curtis
- Night of Dark Shadows – 1971 film by Dan Curtis
