= Angus, Thongs and Perfect Snogging =

2008 film by Gurinder Chadha

- Theatrical release poster
- Directed by: Gurinder Chadha
- Screenplay by: Gurinder Chadha; Paul Mayeda Berges; Will McRobb Chris Viscardi
- Based on: Angus, Thongs and Full-Frontal Snogging and It's OK, I'm Wearing Really Big Knickers by Louise Rennison
- Produced by: Gurinder Chadha; Lynda Obst
- Starring: Georgia Groome; Alan Davies; Karen Taylor; Aaron Johnson; Eleanor Tomlinson
- Cinematography: Richard Pope
- Edited by: Justin Krish; Martin Walsh
- Music by: Joby Talbot
- Production companies: Nickelodeon Movies; Goldcrest Pictures
- Distributed by: Paramount Pictures
- Release dates: 25 July 2008 (United Kingdom); 28 August 2008 (Germany); 19 January 2010 (United States)
- Running time: 100 minutes
- Countries: United Kingdom; United States; Germany
- Language: English
- Box office: $14.9 million

Angus, Thongs and Perfect Snogging (also known as Angus, Thongs and Full-Frontal Snogging) is a 2008 teen romantic comedy film co-written and directed by Gurinder Chadha, based on the young adult novels Angus, Thongs and Full-Frontal Snogging (1999) and It's OK, I'm Wearing Really Big Knickers (2000) by Louise Rennison. The film stars Georgia Groome, Alan Davies, Karen Taylor, Aaron Johnson and Eleanor Tomlinson. The plot follows 14-year-old Georgia Nicholson (Groome) as she tries to find a boyfriend while also organising her 15th birthday party.

== Plot ==
Fourteen-year-old Georgia Nicolson lives in Eastbourne with her parents Connie and Bob and younger sister Libby. She is insecure about her appearance and fears she will never have a boyfriend. On the first day of the new school term, Georgia and her friends Jas, Ellen and Rosie spot fraternal twin brothers Robbie and Tom Jennings, who have recently moved to Eastbourne from London.

Georgia and Jas decide to approach the brothers in their mother's organic foodshop, where they work. Jas is quickly enamored with Tom and Georgia strikes up a conversation with Robbie. However, they soon discover that Robbie is dating Lindsay, the most popular girl in school and Georgia's archrival. After learning that Robbie likes cats, Georgia pretends that her cat Angus has gone missing and asks Robbie for help finding him. Jas has Angus on a leash in the park, but he escapes and Tom rescues him just as Georgia and Robbie arrive. Robbie leaves to spend time with Lindsay and Tom asks Jas on a date, after which they become a couple.

Bob moves to New Zealand after receiving a promotion, while the rest of the family stays in England. During his absence, Connie hires a handsome interior decorator, Jem, to redo the living room, and begins to spend increasingly longer periods of time with him, prompting Georgia to worry about the state of her parents' marriage.

Determined to impress Robbie, Georgia takes "snogging lessons" from a classmate, Peter, who becomes infatuated with her. When Peter tries to kiss Georgia at a party, he embarrasses her in front of Robbie (who later assumes that Georgia and Peter are a couple), Lindsay, Jas and Tom. In order to evade Peter, Georgia lies to him about being a lesbian. When Tom invites Jas to go swimming with him and Robbie, Georgia tags along. While in the pool, Robbie and Georgia kiss. Before leaving, Robbie promises to call Georgia later.

After not hearing from Robbie in a while, Georgia is heartbroken. She decides to make Robbie jealous, hoping he will realise his feelings for her. She invites Robbie's best friend, Dave, to a concert by Robbie's band, the Stiff Dylans. Seeing Georgia and Dave dancing and laughing, Robbie tries to talk to her but is stopped by Lindsay.

At school, Dave confronts Georgia about using him to make Robbie jealous. Upon learning what Georgia did to Dave, Robbie severs ties with her. Georgia discovers it was Jas who accidentally leaked this information. After Georgia kicks Jas in the shin during an argument, they vow never to speak to each other again. Shortly afterwards, Robbie tells Georgia he was considering breaking up with Lindsay before becoming involved with her, but now he is disappointed with her recent behaviour.

Devastated, Georgia decides that she would like to move to New Zealand. She stops by her father's workplace and tearfully vents to the receptionist, telling her that she does not want her family to be apart from each other. She later goes to the beach, knowing Robbie would be there, and apologises to him. Robbie reveals he ended things with Lindsay and admits he still likes Georgia.

On Georgia's 15th birthday, Connie takes her to a nightclub for the first time. The place initially seems empty, but Georgia's friends and family soon arrive to reveal a surprise birthday party, which Jas secretly organised with Connie. Georgia and Jas make amends. Bob returns from New Zealand, having accepted a new job opportunity in Eastbourne. It is revealed that Jem is gay and his boyfriend owns the club. While the Stiff Dylans are performing the song "Ultraviolet", which Robbie wrote about Georgia, Lindsay arrives from her own birthday party (which no one attended) and demands that Robbie choose between her and Georgia. He chooses Georgia, kissing her onstage. Jas pulls out Lindsay's bra inserts and tosses them into the crowd, prompting Lindsay to storm off.

Ultimately, Georgia realises she does not need to change her appearance, as Robbie likes her the way she is.

== Cast ==
- Georgia Groome as Georgia Nicolson, a 14-year-old girl looking for a boyfriend
- Aaron Johnson as Robbie Jennings, Georgia's love interest
- Karen Taylor as Connie Nicolson, Georgia's mother
- Alan Davies as Bob Nicolson, Georgia's father
- Eleanor Tomlinson as Jas, Georgia's best friend who wants a boyfriend just as much as Georgia
- Georgia Henshaw as Rosie, a member of the "Ace Gang" alongside Georgia, Jas and Ellen. She is the experienced one of the group as she already has a boyfriend
- Manjeeven Grewal as Ellen, another member of the "Ace Gang"
- Kimberley Nixon as Lindsay Marlings
- Sean Bourke as Tom Jennings, Robbie's twin brother, Jas' boyfriend.
- Tommy Bastow as Dave "the Laugh", one of Robbie's friends
- Liam Hess as Peter Dyer, a boy in Georgia's class who gives girls kissing lessons
- Eva Drew as Liberty "Libby" Nicolson, Georgia's eccentric five-year-old sister
- Steve Jones as Jem, a contractor
- Imogen Bain as the headmistress
- Ingrid Oliver as Miss Stamp
- Matt Brinkler as Sven, Rosie's boyfriend, an exchange student from Sweden
- Heather Wright as the receptionist
- Lizzie Roper as Becky
- Ray Shirley as the woman with the poodle
- Stiff Dylans as themselves
- Benny and Jimmy as Angus, Georgia's cat

== Production ==
=== Development ===
Chadha was originally brought into the project as a scriptwriter:

When the project came to me, the studio, Paramount, had had it for five years and even though they're British books they had these two American guys adapt the book and they couldn't get it to work. I read the script and thought how weird, this is a sort of LA male's version of an English girl's childhood and then I read the books and I thought wow, there is something here that relates to me growing up that I hadn't seen in the script. I thought this could be a British genre film or be like Clueless or Mean Girls in England and I liked the idea of doing a British version of those films. Then it clicked that it should be like Sixteen Candles.

=== Filming ===
Most of the scenes were filmed on location in Brighton and Eastbourne. Others, such as the gig scene and some interiors and exteriors for Georgia's house, were filmed in and around Ealing Studios, London. Areas in nearby west London like Bishopshalt school in Hillingdon and the Liquid nightclub in Uxbridge were used as well. Other sites include locations in Teddington and Twickenham. Costumes included green blazers and kilts borrowed from St. Bede's Prep School in Eastbourne, and props included Eastbourne's signature blue bins to add to the effect and continuity when filming in multiple locations.

== Music ==
Angus, Thongs and Perfect Snogging: Music from the Motion Picture

Soundtrack album by Various artists
- Released: 21 July 2008
- Genre: Pop rock
- Label: Columbia

CD
No.	Title	Artist	Length
1.	"She's So Lovely"	Scouting for Girls	3:42
2.	"Girls and Boys in Love"	The Rumble Strips	2:31
3.	"The Show"	Lenka	3:54
4.	"Naïve"	Lily Allen	3:44
5.	"She's Got You High"	Mumm-Ra	3:24
6.	"Who Needs Love"	Razorlight	3:31
7.	"Your Song"	Kate Walsh	4:07
8.	"Mad About the Boy"	Ava Leigh	3:22
9.	"Young Folks"	Peter Bjorn and John	4:37
10.	"Toothpaste Kisses"	The Maccabees	2:37
11.	"Sugar Mouse"	Oh, Atoms	4:36
12.	"Ever Fallen in Love"	Stiff Dylans	2:59
13.	"I Found Out"	The Pigeon Detectives	2:03
14.	"In the Morning"	The Coral	2:32
15.	"Pull Shapes"	The Pipettes	2:58
16.	"Great DJ"	The Ting Tings	3:22
17.	"Ultraviolet"	Stiff Dylans	3:46

Some songs played in the film were not included on the soundtrack:

1. "Out of Time" – Stiff Dylans
2. "You're the Best Thing" – The Style Council
3. "Agadoo" – Black Lace
4. "True" – Spandau Ballet
5. "I'm Your Man" – Shane Richie
6. "Mr. Loverman" – Shabba Ranks
7. "Dance wiv Me" – Dizzee Rascal featuring Calvin Harris and Chrome
8. "Teenage Kicks" – Nouvelle Vague
9. "Big Fish, Little Fish" – Nik Martin

== Release ==
Angus, Thongs and Perfect Snogging was the first film produced by Nickelodeon Movies to receive a PG-13 rating. The film was not released theatrically in the United States, instead having its US premiere on Nick at Nite and TeenNick, and was later released on DVD on 19 January 2010.

== Reception ==
=== Box office ===
Angus, Thongs and Perfect Snogging grossed $10.6 million (£6.6 million) in the United Kingdom and had a worldwide gross of $14.9 million. It became the 42nd-highest-grossing film of 2008 in the UK.

=== Critical response ===
The film received positive reviews. Review aggregation website Rotten Tomatoes gives the film an approval rating of 73% based on reviews from 26 critics, with an average score of 5.9/10. The site's critics consensus states: "Based on two of British writer Louise Rennison's popular books, Angus, Thongs and Perfect Snogging is a pleasant and funny tween comedy, comfortable for UK audiences as well as stateside crowds."

Critics noted the strong central performance of Georgia Groome, who was praised for her "super-engaging" performance.
