= Anna Kemp =

Children's book author

Anna Kemp is a children's book author. Her books have been shortlisted for the Oscar's Book Prize, Roald Dahl Funny Prize, and Waterstones Children's Book Prize.

== Awards ==
Awards for Kemp's work
Year	Title	Award	Result	Ref.
2010	Dogs Don't Do Ballet	Booktrust Early Years Award	Finalist	
2010	Dogs Don't Do Ballet	Roald Dahl Funny Prize	Finalist	
2011	Fantastic Frankie and the Brain-Drain Machine	Waterstones Children's Book Prize for Best Book	Finalist	
2012	The Worst Princess	Roald Dahl Funny Prize	Finalist	
2012	The Worst Princess	Waterstones Children's Book Prize for Picture Books	Finalist	
2016	Sir Lilypad	Oscar's Book Prize	Finalist	
2018	Dave the Lonely Monster	Dundee Picture Book Award	Finalist	

== Publications ==
=== Middle-grade books ===
==== Frankie books ====
- Fantastic Frankie and the Brain Drain Machine. Illustrated by Alex T. Smith. Simon & Schuster. 2012.
- The Great Brain Robbery. Illustrated by Teresa Murfin. Simon & Schuster. 2013.

==== The Goblyn Wood Adventures ====
1. Into Goblyn Wood. Illustrated by David Wyatt. Simon & Schuster. 2022.
2. The Hollow Hills. Illustrated by David Wyatt. Simon & Schuster. 2023.
3. The Howling Mountain. Illustrated by David Wyatt. Simon & Schuster. 2025.

=== Picture books ===
- Dogs Don’t Do Ballet. Illustrated by Sara Ogilvie. Simon & Schuster. 2010.
- Rhinos Don’t Eat Pancakes. Illustrated by Sara Ogilvie. Simon & Schuster. 2011.
- The Worst Princess. Illustrated by Sara Ogilvie. Simon & Schuster. 2012.
- Sir Lilypad: A Tall Tale of a Small Frog. Illustrated by Sara Ogilvie. Simon & Schuster. 2015.
- Dave the Lonely Monster. Illustrated by Sara Ogilvie. Simon & Schuster. 2018.
- The Little Mermaid. Illustrated by Natelle Quek. Puffin. 2021.
- Mammoth: Big Beast, Big City, Big Trouble. Illustrated by Adam Beer. Simon & Schuster. 2021.
- Wild Wild Wood. Illustrated by Natelle Quek. Puffin. 2023.
- Moggie McFlea: The Witch's Cat. Illustrated by Adam Beer. Simon & Schuster. 2024.
- The Muttcracker. Illustrated by Sara Ogilvie. Simon & Schuster. 2024.
- Penguin’s Egg: A Tale of Trucks, Trains and One Determined Dad. Illustrated by Alice Courtley. Puffin. 2024.
