= She's Got You High =

Single by Mumm-Ra

from the album These Things Move in Threes
- Released: May 2007
- Genre: Indie rock
- Length: 3:25
- Label: Columbia
- Songwriter: Mumm-Ra
- Producer: Mumm-Ra / Ollie Hodge

Mumm-Ra singles chronology
"What Would Steve Do?" (2007)	"She's Got You High" (2007)	"Starlight" (2007)

"She's Got You High" is the third single by Mumm-Ra, released by Columbia on May 14, 2007. It reached #41 in the UK Singles Chart, one place lower than previous single "What Would Steve Do?". It was also two sales off a top 40 position. The YouTube video has had 972,000 views.

The "Out of the Question" version featured as a B-side is a live recording from a gig on the NME Awards 2007 Indie Rock tour, and There She Is featured on their EP Black Hurts Day and the Night Rolls On.

The song was featured on the soundtracks to the films Angus, Thongs and Perfect Snogging and (500) Days of Summer, and plays during the ending credits of the latter. It also played in an episode of Torchwood, two episodes of the E4 drama Nearly Famous and The Inbetweeners TV Soundtrack.

Since then, the song has been used on a television advert for UK supermarket Waitrose.

== Track listings ==
All songs written by Mumm-Ra.

CD

1. "She's Got You High"
2. "Indiscrete"
3. "Song E"
4. "Out of the Question (live)"

7"

1. "She's Got You High"
2. "Indiscrete"

Gatefold 7"

1. "She's Got You High"
2. "There She Is (acoustic)"

== Charts ==
Weekly chart performance for "She's Got You High"
Chart (2007)	Peak position
UK Singles (Official Charts)	41
