= The Imaginarium of Doctor Parnassus (soundtrack) =

The Imaginarium of Doctor Parnassus (Original Motion Picture Soundtrack)

Film score by Mychael Danna and Jeff Danna
- Released: 19 October 2009
- Recorded: 2009
- Genre: Film score
- Length: 47:31
- Label: Silva Screen
- Producers: Mychael Danna; Jeff Danna

Mychael Danna chronology
The Time Traveler's Wife (2009)	The Imaginarium of Doctor Parnassus (2009)	Chloe (2010)

Jeff Danna chronology
The Boondock Saints II: All Saints Day (2009)	The Imaginarium of Doctor Parnassus (2009)	Formosa Betrayed (2010)

The Imaginarium of Doctor Parnassus (Original Motion Picture Soundtrack) is the film score composed by Mychael Danna and Jeff Danna to the 2009 film The Imaginarium of Doctor Parnassus, directed by Terry Gilliam starring Heath Ledger, Christopher Plummer, Verne Troyer, Andrew Garfield, Lily Cole, Tom Waits, Johnny Depp, Colin Farrell, and Jude Law. The score was released through Silva Screen Records on 19 October 2009.

== Background ==
The film score is composed by Mychael Danna and Jeff Danna, who had previously worked on Gilliam's Tideland (2005). Despite both brothers having distinctive musical identities, they worked as a team for this film, wanting the score to sound "timeless and archaic". Owing to the duo's previous collaboration with Gilliam, the latter entrusted them which in turn the brothers surprised him with "a very eclectic score, going all over the place—a real potpourri of different sounds and textures."

Besides directing, Gilliam wrote lyrics for the two songs: "We Love Violence" and "We Are the Children of the World". The songs were performed by Gilliam, Mick Audsley, Ray Cooper, Ed Hall and Andre Jacquemin, under the Sir Ian Blair Memorial Choir, and Jam Theater Company Choir, conducted Jo Noel Hartley. "We Are the Children of the World" spoofed Michael Jackson's famous song "We Are the World". Gilliam opined that "That song used to make me crazy, and so here was my revenge. And it's that terrible saccharine business that goes on, especially to do with charities and doing good in the world, and how people just fall for it in many instances."

== Track listing ==
No.	Title	Lyrics	Artist(s)	Length
1.	"Once Upon A Time"			01:44
2.	"The Imaginarium"			01:06
3.	"The Tack"			02:25
4.	"Tony's Tale of Woe"			01:39
5.	"The Monastery"			02:43
6.	"Book & Story"			02:58
7.	"Sympathy for the Hanged Man"			02:17
8.	"The First to Five Souls"			01:58
9.	"Escape from the Pub"			02:27
10.	"The River"			01:45
11.	"Suicide Attempt"			02:18
12.	"Tango Amongst the Lilies"			02:39
13.	"Victory in the Lilies"			02:51
14.	"Four Through the Mirror"			02:07
15.	"The Ladder World"			01:28
16.	"We Love Violence"	Terry Gilliam	The Sir Ian Blair Memorial Choir (Mick Audsley, Ray Cooper, Ed Hall, Andre Jacquemin, Terry Gilliam)	00:43
17.	"Top of the Wagon"			01:11
18.	"We Are the Children of the World"	Terry Gilliam	Jam Theater Company Choir (conducted by Jo Noel Hartley)	00:40
19.	"Tony's World Collapses"			02:18
20.	"The Devil's Dance"			01:42
21.	"Tony's Salvation?"			03:42
22.	"Parnassus Alone"			04:50
Total length:				47:31

== Reception ==
Jonathan Broxton of Movie Music UK wrote "The score is nothing if not a mixed bag, but it is precisely this tonal insanity which might alienate some sections of the soundtrack-buying public who are not used to such flights of fancy. Personally, I loved the inventiveness of the Dannas’ work, and thoroughly enjoyed the trip through the musical dreamland they created for the film. However, less adventurous souls may be forgiven for thinking that Doctor Parnassus’s place is not an imaginarium, but an asylum for the musically schizophrenic." Filmtracks wrote "Despite the free-spirited movement of this score through several genres, the Danna brothers manage to keep the whole quite cohesively listenable until the two songs near the end. There are no overwhelming highlights to be heard in the music for The Imaginarium of Doctor Parnassus, but its album release is perfect in length and its dry mix allows for an intimate appreciation of the Dannas' creative interpretations of Gilliam's quirky imagination." Manohla Dargis of The New York Times called the music as " hurdy-gurdy". Ray Bennett of The Hollywood Reporter wrote "The score by Mychael Danna and Jeff Danna has the required flair and sweep." Brendon Connolly of /Film called it a "splendid score".

== Credits ==
Credits adapted from production notes:

- Music composer and producer: Mychael Danna and Jeff Danna
- Music conductor and orchestrator: Nicholas Dodd
- Recording: Brad Haehnel, Jonathan Allen, Jake Jackson
- Mixing: Brad Haehnel, Simon Rhodes
- Recording studios: The Hungarian Public Radio
- Mixing studio: Phoenix Sound
- Orchestra: The Budapest Film Orchestra
- Music coordinator: Paul Talkington
- Musical director: Nick Ingman
- Musical assistance: Amrita Fernandes, Bakshi
- Music consultant: Becky Bentham
- Music clearances: Sarah Webster
- Musicians' contractor: Isobel Griffiths
- Assistant musicians' contractor: Lucy Whalley

== Accolades ==
Award	Category	Recipient	Result	Ref.
International Film Music Critics Association	Best Original Score for a Fantasy/Science Fiction Film	Mychael Danna and Jeff Danna	Nominated	
Satellite Awards	Best Original Song	Terry Gilliam For the song "We Are the Children of the World"	Nominated	
SOCAN Awards	International Film Music Award	Mychael Danna and Jeff Danna	Nominated	
