= Angus, Thongs and Full-Frontal Snogging =

Book by Louise Rennison

- First edition cover
- Author: Louise Rennison
- Language: English
- Series: Confessions of Georgia Nicolson
- Genre: Young adult humour, epistolary novel
- Publisher: Piccadilly Press
- Publication date: 24 June 1999
- Publication place: United Kingdom
- Media type: Print
- Pages: 160
- ISBN: 1-85340-519-1
- OCLC: 40980419
- Followed by: It's OK, I'm Wearing Really Big Knickers

Angus, Thongs and Full-Frontal Snogging is a 1999 young adult novel by English author Louise Rennison. The book is the first of ten books in the Confessions of Georgia Nicolson series. The book was adapted into a film, Angus, Thongs and Perfect Snogging, released in the United Kingdom and the United States in July 2008.

== Plot summary ==
Georgia, a teenager, lives with her mother, father, three-year-old sister Libby, and her wild cat, Angus, whom the family found on a holiday to Scotland. Georgia bumps into the popular and attractive Robbie (the "Sex-God"), while helping her best friend, Jas, subtly stalk his brother at the grocery store where he works. The problem is that he is older and has a girlfriend, Lindsay, an older girl who wears a thong and bra padding and secretly claims to be engaged to him. Robbie eventually dumps Lindsay, but tells Georgia that he should not date her because she is too young. In an effort to appear more mature, Georgia tries to bleach a strip of her hair blonde, but it comes off in her hand. Fortunately for her, Robbie is attracted to her and finds her eccentricity amusing and endearing and suggests taking it slow. However, Georgia's mum comes in at the very end and announces that they have tickets to go to New Zealand for the summer to visit her father, who has gone there searching for work, putting a dampener on Georgia's new summer romance.

== Censorship ==
The book is number 35 on the American Library Association's list of frequently challenged or banned books from 2000-2009. Georgia's frequently disrespectful attitude towards her parents and other authority figures have contributed to the challenges, as well as sexual content, profanity, age inappropriateness and the references to homosexuality.

In 2009, the book was challenged at the Maplewood Middle School Library in Wisconsin, leading the school to require parental consent before allowing students to have access to it.

In 2022, Angus, Thongs and Full-Frontal Snogging was listed among 52 books banned by the Alpine School District following the implementation of Utah law H.B. 374, “Sensitive Materials In Schools." Forty-two percent of removed books “feature LBGTQ+ characters and or themes.” Many of the books were removed because they were considered to contain pornographic material according to the new law, which defines porn using the following criteria:

- "The average person" would find that the material, on the whole, "appeals to prurient interest in sex"
- The material "is patently offensive in the description or depiction of nudity, sexual conduct, sexual excitement, sadomasochistic abuse, or excretion"
- The material, on the whole, "does not have serious literary, artistic, political or scientific value."

== Awards ==
It won the Nestlé Smarties Book Prize Bronze Award, was shortlisted for the Branford Boase Award, and was voted number 127 in the BBC's Big Read poll to find the UK's favourite book. It was also named a Printz Honor book in 2001.
