= Oli Frost =

British satirist (born 1991)

- Born: Oliver Frost; London, England
- Education: University College London
- Website: olifro.st

Oli Frost (born 1991) is a British satirist and musician, who creates "novelty songs about the climate crisis".

In 2018 he appeared on the show Britain's Got Talent posing as a recorder player who covered hip-hop tracks. His other work includes Lifefaker (a service that helps you fake a perfect life on Instagram), Flopstarter (a crowdfunding platform for bad ideas), and an eBay auction of all his personal data.

== Music ==
Frost appeared on Britain's Got Talent 2018 posing as "Recorda Boi", a recorder player who covered hip-hop tracks. On the show Recorda Boi explained how he wanted to make the recorder cool again.

A lot of people gave up recorder at Mary Had A Little Lamb and Row, Row, Row Your Boat. I kind of kept going…

— Recorda Boi, Britain's Got Talent

In 2020, Frost released The Greta Thunberg Song, which Greta Thunberg recreated the video of. It was followed by a series of other "novelty songs about the climate crisis". Frost's biggest song to date is The Vampire Conspiracy, with over 10 million listens across platforms.

Frost started his musical career as a drummer; however, he told Canary Media that he "developed a drummer complex of not wanting to be just a drummer," so he learned more instruments. He named Flight of the Conchords as an inspiration for his climate change-themed novelty songs.

== Work ==
=== Lifefaker.com ===
In 2018, Frost "founded" Lifefaker.com, a startup which appeared to sell photos that could help users fake a perfect life on Instagram. However, when visitors tried to buy the photos they instead found the site was part of a campaign by mental health startup Sanctus. In an interview he explained how the idea came to him.

“Last year I fractured both my knees falling off a chair I’d stood on to take an aerial photo of my rainbow bowl… After the accident I thought about quitting social media for a while. And then I had a better idea: Lifefaker.com.”

— Oli Frost, i-d

The site was covered in the media around the world and provoked online discussions on how social media impacts our mental health.

=== eBay Data Sale ===
In May 2018, Frost put an archive of all his personal data on eBay. According to his listing, the data included "every like, post, and inane comment since I was 16," "photos dating back to when I had a fringe and listened to Billy Talent," and "loads more, like who I vote for, my boss's name, and where all my family live". Within 24 hours the auction had £300 in bids, with 44 bidders and 5 days remaining. However, an hour after the story appeared on news sites, eBay removed the listing on the grounds it might violate Facebook's Terms and Conditions. Frost later apologised on his blog for mistakenly thinking he owned his personal data.

I realised that I’d been giving away my data for free for ages, and decided it was time to cash in.

— Oli Frost, Vice

=== Flopstarter ===
Frost is the creator and editor of the site Flopstarter, a crowdfunding site for bad ideas. The site allows users to submit and back projects such as "Natural Death Beef", "1D Printers", and "Coconut Shampoo for Coconuts". Presenter Richard Bacon described the site as "basically, a really good idea about really bad ideas".

== Activism ==
In 2015, Frost co-created The Homeless Period, a campaign to get homeless women better access to sanitary care. The campaign's petition to give shelters an allowance to buy sanitary products passed its goal of 100,000 signatures and in 2016 was raised in UK Parliament.

The campaign gave rise to numerous local projects around the world that organise the collection and distribution of sanitary products to shelters and foodbanks.
