= It's OK, I'm Wearing Really Big Knickers =

2000 novel by Louise Rennison

- First edition
- Author: Louise Rennison
- Language: English
- Series: Confessions of Georgia Nicolson
- Genre: Young adult humour
- Publisher: Piccadilly Press
- Publication date: May 2000
- Publication place: United Kingdom
- Media type: Print (Hardback; Paperback)
- Pages: 204
- ISBN: 1-85340-690-2
- OCLC: 42953744
- Preceded by: Angus, Thongs and Full-Frontal Snogging
- Followed by: Knocked Out by My Nunga-Nungas

It's OK, I'm Wearing Really Big Knickers is a 2000 best-selling young adult novel by English author Louise Rennison, the second in the Confessions of Georgia Nicolson series. It was published in the United States as On the Bright Side, I'm Now the Girlfriend of a Sex God. Elements of the book were used in the 2008 film Angus, Thongs and Perfect Snogging.

== Plot ==
In the previous novel, Georgia has finally landed the "Sex God", her longtime crush Robbie Jennings, for a boyfriend. Georgia's dad has gone to New Zealand for a few months. While he is gone, her young sister Libby is ill and Georgia's mother takes her to the doctors. When they return, "Gee's" mum has seen a new doctor and rather likes him; she begins finding any excuse she can to make an appointment with him. After a while, Georgia's mother announces that the family are off to New Zealand for a month, but Georgia feels she cannot possibly leave as she has just got the boy of her dreams and it would be a dastardly crime to leave him.

Georgia does not leave for New Zealand, but Robbie says she is too young for him and leaves her. Georgia decides to use Dave the Laugh (Robbie's mate) as a red herring to make Robbie jealous and come back to/for her. Georgia feels guilty for using Dave the Laugh and she breaks up with him. Georgia feels extremely awful about it, until she learns that Dave has started dating her friend Ellen (one of her best mates out of her "Ace Gang"). In the end Robbie admits he can't stop thinking about Georgia and really misses her and her weird ways. He asks her to be his girlfriend again.

In a subplot, Georgia's cat Angus becomes interested in a pedigree cat named Naomi belonging to new grumpy elderly neighbours across the road.
