= Mirrors (band) =

English synthpop band

Background information
- Origin: Brighton, England
- Genre: Synthpop
- Years active: 2008–present
- Labels: Pure Groove, Moshi Moshi, Skint Records, PIAS Recordings
- Members: James New; James Arguile; Josef Page
- Past members: Ally Young
- Website: mirrorsofficial.bandcamp.com

Mirrors are an English synthpop band originating from Brighton who formed in 2008. The band consists of James New (lead vocals and synthesizers), James Arguile (synthesizers) and Josef Page (electronic drums). They prefer to describe their music as 'electronic soul' and 'pop noir' with their main instruments being analogue synthesizers.

Mirrors' brand of synthesizer-driven pop music is compared to the sound of bands such as Kraftwerk, Depeche Mode, Blancmange, and formative influence Orchestral Manoeuvres in the Dark (OMD), whom they have supported on tour. The group released their debut album in February 2011 called Lights and Offerings which was promoted by a number of singles in 2010 and 2011.

== History ==
=== Formation (2008) ===
Mirrors were formed by James New and Ally Young after Mumm-Ra broke up in 2008. The two met in Brighton in 2008 and started working on the idea of, according to them, the ideal group, in May 2008. James: "This ideal group would have visuals as part of their live experience. It would have things going on on pavements. It would play in the middle of a room."

James Arguile would soon join the group followed by Josef Page, leaving behind him a career in hospital administration. As the final member and they started working on their visuals which would include suits and ties and keeping control over their artwork and videos.

=== "Look at Me" / "Into the Heart" (2009) ===
Their first live performance was in May 2009 at New Hero in Brighton. After demoing some songs that year such as "Fear of Drowning", "Hide and Seek", "Searching in the Wilderness" and "Write Through the Night" (called "Organ Song" as a demo, because of the heavy usage of organ-soundlike synthesizers), the first single would become "Look at Me", released through the Pure Groove label, supposedly to be limited to just 200 copies on a one-sided red vinyl 7". Soon after their first release they signed up with Moshi Moshi and released their second single, "Into the Heart" in November, which also featured a new B-side called "Lights and Offerings", a title they would use in 2011 for their debut album.

=== Lights and Offerings (2010–2011) ===
After this they came to the attention of Skint Records. Skint Records appeared to be an obvious choice, because the label is from Mirrors' home town Brighton, making face-to-face contact much easier. The label also understand their goals and artistic direction.

Mirrors continued with performing the occasional gigs in the United Kingdom until they headed into the studio in June 2010, working on their debut album. Having written most of the material already in 2009, the album sessions could be finishing in just one month. The first single from these sessions was "Ways to an End", released on 23 August as a download and 7" vinyl single. In 2010, Mirrors were chosen as a support act by OMD, one of their influences. The band released two more singles and a special tour EP before their debut album Lights and Offerings was released on 28 February 2011 in the UK and on 18 March in Europe.

They started touring as a headline act on 12 April 2011 in Cologne, Germany and supported OMD in Spain in June.

A fourth single from the debut album was released on 6 June 2011 being "Look at Me" with the double A-side "Perfectly Still". The single was previously released in 2009 on the Pure Groove label. The new single features a new remix by Simon Thornton.

Mirrors' first documentary was aired on Channel 4 on 9 June 2011 at 0:35am GMT as part of the 4Play program. On 8 July 2011 they performed live in Berlin, Germany, at the Michalsky Stylenite fashion show which was streamed live on the internet

On 16 August 2011 Mirrors announced that they cancelled the September performances with OMD plus their performance at Bestival, Isle Of Wight, as they were working on new material.

Radioactive Man released a remix of the Mirrors' track "Ways to an End" on 12 September 2011. The digital bundle contains a remix and an instrumental version of the aforementioned remix.

On 13 October Ally Young announced he was leaving the band.

Two new songs were made available on the band's Myspace account and SoundCloud on 19 October 2011. They also confirmed that the remaining three band members will continue and are back in the studio recording further tracks.

Skint released a digital compilation EP of previously released remixes plus a few new ones, entitled Deconstructed.

=== This Year, Next Year, Sometime . . . ? (2012–present) ===
Mirrors released a new digital EP on 26 January 2012, called This Year, Next Year, Sometime . . . ?, in order to finance their potential second studio album. The EP contains the two new songs that were made available in October 2011 plus five previously unreleased demos, which were recorded either in the last couple of months or during their first album session in June 2010.

== Discography ==
=== Albums ===
- Lights and Offerings (2011) (UK chart peak: No. 161)

=== EPs ===
- Broken by Silence (2010)
- Deconstructed (2011)
- This Year, Next Year, Sometime . . . ? (2012)

=== Singles ===
- "Look at Me" (2009)
- "Into the Heart" (2009)
- "Ways to an End" (2010)
- "Hide and Seek" (2010)
- "Into the Heart" (2011)
- "The White EP"' (2011)
- "Look at Me" (2011)
- "Ways to an End (Radioactive Man Rework)" (2011)
- "Hourglass" (2012, download only)

=== Promotional releases ===
The releases below were issued on CD for promotional purposes only.

- Coming 2010 (2009)
- Remixes (03/2010)
- Mixtape (07/2010)
- Theme Time Radio Ear II (08/2010)
- Theme Time Radio Ear III (09/2010)
