= Louise Rennison =

English author and comedian

- Born: 11 October 1951; Leeds, West Riding of Yorkshire, England
- Died: 29 February 2016 (aged 64); Brighton, East Sussex, England
- Writing career
- Notable works: Confessions of Georgia Nicolson; The Misadventures of Tallulah Casey
- Website: louiserennison.com

Louise Rennison (11 October 1951 – 29 February 2016) was an English author and comedian who wrote the Confessions of Georgia Nicolson series for teenage girls. The series records the exploits of a teenage girl, Georgia Nicolson, and her best friends, the Ace Gang. Her first and second novels, Angus, Thongs and Full-Frontal Snogging and It's OK, I'm Wearing Really Big Knickers were portrayed in a film adaptation called Angus, Thongs and Perfect Snogging. Rennison also wrote a series of books about Georgia's younger cousin, The Misadventures of Tallulah Casey.

Her one-woman live show Stevie Wonder Felt My Face won acclaim in the 1980s; her other shows were Bob Marley's Gardener Sold My Friend and Never Eat Anything Bigger Than Your Head.

== Early life ==
Rennison was brought up in Leeds, Yorkshire, in a three-bedroomed council house in Seacroft with her mum, dad, grandparents, aunt, uncle (Robin) and cousin. She attended Parklands High School, an all-girls school, from the age of 11, which she later credited with inspiring her as a comedic writer. When she was 15, her family moved to Wairakei, New Zealand, where she became pregnant at 17 and had a daughter, whom she placed for adoption.

On returning to the UK, Rennison lived in a small flat in Notting Hill doing an assortment of jobs until she decided to pursue her dream of acting and enrolled in a Performing Arts course at the University of Brighton. In Brighton, she was part of Liz Aggiss and Billy Cowie's dance company, Six Divas, performing in their 1986 show, Torei en Veran Veta Arnold!. With 'Barmy' Jane Bassett, Joanna Boyce and Sarah Tompkinson she created a female cabaret group, Women with Beards, that poked fun at men and why they are responsible "for all the ills of society." Rennison and Bassett later performed as a double act, called Etheldreda.

== Career ==
Rennison's first major success was her one-woman autobiographical show, "Stevie Wonder Felt My Face." She went on tour performing this show, including at the Edinburgh Fringe Festival, and the BBC later produced a one-off special of it. She began to write for Woman's Hour on Radio Four, for comedians, and for a London newspaper. Her newspaper column was written about whatever personally interested her, such as how pointless it is to date over 35, and led to an invitation from Picadilly Press to write a teenage diary book. They said her writing was "so self-obsessed and so childish" that she would be perfect to write such a book.

Rennison's first novel, Angus, Thongs and Full-Frontal Snogging, was published in 1999 and became a worldwide bestseller, translated into 34 languages. Being her first novel, she used real names of people from her childhood as she wrote and forgot to change the names before the book was published. As a result, childhood friends were able to recognise themselves in the stories.

Rennison said that she wrote not in an attempt to teach, but to make herself laugh. She said, "I wanted Georgia to be a decent person. I wanted her to be someone who is a bit stupid and self-obsessed and difficult and funny and rude, and a bit jealous and all those other things. But I wanted her to have a good heart." Rennison also said that her books were not just for teenage girls, but aimed to have a "potential resonance beyond the young." In particular, Rennison often brought feminist ideals into her writing. She wanted her books to get girls talking and deciding for themselves what they wanted to do and who they wanted to be, rather than letting men decide for them.

Rennison wrote a number of sequels to Angus, Thongs and Full-Frontal Snogging, and in 2010 began a second series based on Georgia's cousin, The Misadventures of Tallulah Casey.

Her death was announced on 29 February 2016 by her publisher HarperCollins.

== Recognition ==
Angus, Thongs and Full-Frontal Snogging won the Nestlé Smarties Book Prize Bronze Award in 1999, and was named a Printz Honor Book in 2001.

In 2004, the fourth book in the series, Dancing in my Nuddy-Pants topped The New York Times Best Seller list. In 2008, she was named "Queen of Teen". Rennison was also rewarded with the Roald Dahl Funny Prize in 2010 for the first book in The Misadventures of Tallulah Casey series, Withering Tights.

In 2008, her "Angus, Thongs and Full-Frontal Snogging" was adapted into a movie by Gurinder Chadha. In the same year, she was a recipient of the Queen of Teen award.

Despite the positive reception of her novels, Rennison faced interrogation from teachers and parents about her content. Often when she visited schools she was well received by the students, but the staff complained to her about the topics she discussed in her novels. Rennison rarely apologised for her writing. She sought out 14-year-old girls to talk with them about what they would want to read and wrote that. Her response to these teachers was, "Surely they know what to expect, they know [my books are] all about boys and snogging and all those experiences. What else am I going to talk about?"

== Publications ==
=== Confessions of Georgia Nicolson ===
1. Angus, Thongs and Full-Frontal Snogging (1999)
2. It's OK, I'm Wearing Really Big Knickers (UK title) / On the Bright Side, I'm Now the Girlfriend of a Sex God (US title) (2001)
3. Knocked Out by my Nunga-Nungas (2002)
4. Dancing in my Nuddy-Pants (2003)
5. ...And That's When It Fell Off in My Hand (UK title) / Away Laughing on a Fast Camel (US title) (2004)
6. ...Then He Ate My Boy Entrancers (2005)
7. Startled by His Furry Shorts (2006)
8. Luuurve is a Many Trousered Thing (UK title) / Love is a Many Trousered Thing (US title) (2007)
9. Stop in the Name of Pants! (2008)
10. Are These My Basoomas I See Before Me? (2009)

In 2007, a guide titled Let the Snog Fest Begin! was released especially for World Book Day. In this, 'Georgia gives her top tips on how to look cool and how NOT to behave if you want to hang on to your Sex God'. A spin-off, titled How To Make Any Twit Fall in Love With You, was made available in instalments in 2011 through SugarScape.

The books detail events in one year of the life of a teenage girl named Georgia Nicolson as she grows up in England, along with a group of her close friends known as 'the Ace Gang.' The story is told autobiographically, through Georgia's journal. The setting exists in a floating timeline; Georgia is 14 years old in the first novel, set in 1999, and only 15 years old in the series' final chapter, set in 2009.

The majority of plotlines explored in the series follow Georgia and her friends' relationships with boys. A continued theme is Georgia's inability to choose between her initial boyfriend Robbie, the Italian Masimo, and her close friend Dave. The books also narrate the relationships of the rest of the Ace Gang, in less detail, and the impact the main antagonist of the series Lindsay has on these relationships.

A continual source of humour within the series derives from Georgia's family; her free-spirited mother, embarrassing father and grandfather, and eccentric younger sister, along with infamously bald Uncle Eddie. Violent pet cats Angus and Gordy (who are mixed breed of domestic cats and Scottish wildcats) provide additional storylines throughout the series.

Georgia's use of language is somewhat unusual, creating an amalgamation of common British slang, neologisms (often created by adding faux-Latin suffixes to everyday English words), and malaprops (e.g., she believes that Emmeline Pankhurst was named "Emily Plankton"). She creates nicknames for countries by combining a key national cultural feature with the suffix "a-gogo-land"; e.g., the USA is Hamburger-a-gogo-land, and New Zealand is Kiwi-a-gogo-land. A glossary is featured in the back of each novel to explain the meaning of her many peculiar phrases, such as 'red-bottomosity' (Georgia's term for unfaithfulness in relationships), as well as things, people, or concepts that international readers may not be familiar with, such as Rolf Harris.

A specialised note is placed at the beginning of the American editions, explaining that some words have bizarrely different meanings between the UK and the US – e.g., "pants," "fanny," and "fag". Georgia remarks on matters such as her bewilderment that people in "Hamburger-a-gogo-land" refer to a lavatory as a "restroom" when she considers it one of the least restful places.

=== The Misadventures of Tallulah Casey ===
- Withering Tights (2010)
- A Midsummer Tights Dream (2012)
- The Taming of the Tights (UK title) / Wild Girls, Wild Boys, Wild Tights (US title) (2013)
