= Broken by Silence =

EP by Mirrors
- Released: November 2010
- Genre: Synthpop
- Label: Skint Records

Mirrors chronology
Broken by Silence (2010)	This Year, Next Year, Sometime . . . ? (2012)

Broken by Silence is the first studio EP by British synthpop band Mirrors. The EP was first available during the Orchestral Manoeuvres in the Dark tour in Germany in November 2010 for which Mirrors were the support act. On sale during the tour will be a CD EP entitled Broken By Silence which will not be available on-line. The EP was later made available on the Skint Records website due to popular demand.
