= Mumm-Ra (band) =

English indie rock band

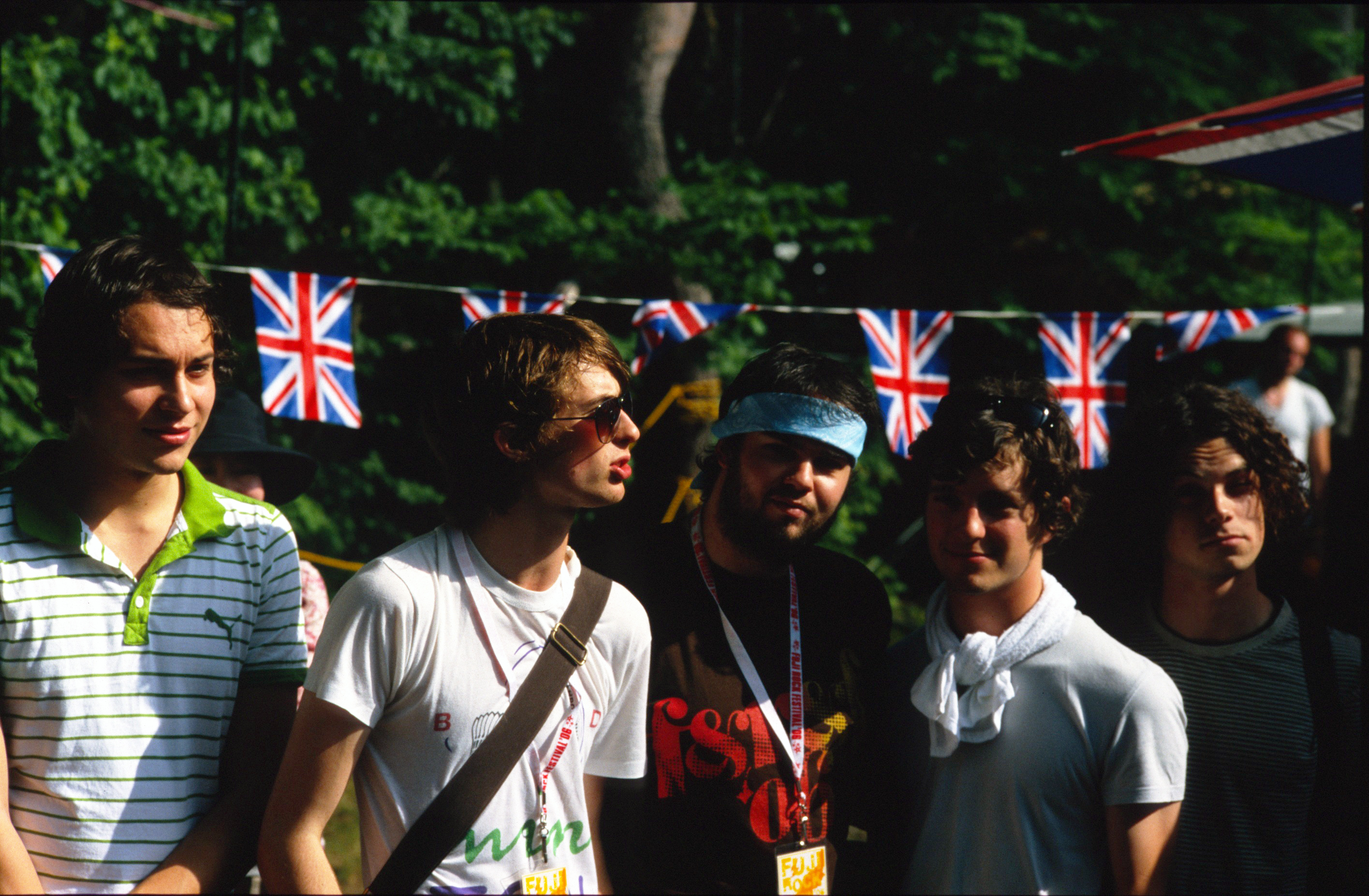

Background information
- Origin: Sussex, England
- Genres: Indie rock, alternative rock
- Years active: 2000–2008, 2012–2014, 2019-present
- Label: Columbia
- Members: James "Noo" New; James Arguile; Oli Frost; Niall Buckler; Gareth Jennings; Tommy Bowen

Mumm-Ra is an English indie rock band, formed in Bexhill-on-Sea in the early 2000s. The band's name is borrowed from the 1980s cartoon, ThunderCats, whose main villain is named Mumm-Ra the Ever-Living. The group consists of vocalist, keyboard player, and occasional guitarist James New, guitarists James Arguile and Oli Frost, bassist Niall Buckler, and drummer Gareth Jennings. Keyboard player Tommy Bowen joined in 2006 as a touring member, before being made a fully fledged member in their 2012 reunion.

The band have released one studio album, These Things Move in Threes in 2007, which spawned the singles "Out of the Question", "What Would Steve Do?" and "She's Got You High". After going on hiatus in 2008, the band reunited for a series of live shows in 2012, as well as releasing an EP of material originally intended for their second album, Back to the Shore in 2014, spawning the singles "Technicolour" and "Jeremy". After another period of inactivity, the band again reunited in 2019 for further shows, a compilation album titled Rarities and a new single, "Summer" in 2020. In 2024 the band released another new single titled "Washout".

== History ==
=== 2000-2006: Formation and early releases ===
The band formed whilst in school in their native Bexhill-on-Sea, starting out as more of a hobby than a serious project. Throughout their early years, the band's lineup changed quite frequently, with one of the incarnations featuring sitar player Carl Gent, pianist Rory Cole and Pete Questier on mandolin. The core group of James New, James Arguile, Oli Frost, Niall Buckler and Gareth Jennings remained the constant. After releasing various demos, the band members made the decision not to go to university, but instead concentrate on the band.

After sending their demo round to various indie labels, Mike Pickering of label Deltasonic passed it on to Columbia Records, who were quick to sign the group. Their debut single "What Would Steve Do?" released in April 2006, followed by their EP Black Hurts Day and the Night Rolls On in July helped the band gain exposure, being "hotly tipped" by music magazine, NME.

In the build up to releasing their debut, the band embarked on several UK tours in 2006, as well as playing Oxegen Festival, Reading and Leeds Festival, T in the Park, Latitude Festival and Fuji Rock Festival. This continued, as the band opened for The Automatic on the 2007 NME Awards Tour along with The View and The Horrors.

=== 2007-2008: These Things Move in Threes and hiatus ===
The band released their debut album, These Things Move In Threes on 28 May 2007 proceeded by singles "Out of the Question" and followed by "She's Got You High".

Over the following year, the band supported The Killers, The Kooks, Kaiser Chiefs, as well as performing at The Great Escape Festival, Glastonbury Festival and Fuji Rock Festival. "Starlight" had been slated to be the fourth single but it was ultimately never released. The band were in the process of writing material for their second album, and had trialed some new tracks live on their tours of both Japan and then on what was ultimately their final UK tour. Jennings co-hosted a Bexhill FM radio show dedicated to Mumm-Ra on 15 July 2007, playing a whole hour of their music, as well as their inspirations and their second album.

On 17 April 2008, the band released a statement announcing that they had decided to split; "after 7 years, 11 months and 21 days of writing and playing music together us Mumm-ra boys have decided our journey as a band has come to an end". After splitting, the band's song "She's Got You High" found success after being featured in the 2009 film (500) Days of Summer. New and Arguile went on to form a new act called Mirrors.

=== 2012-2014: First reformation and Back to the Shore EP ===
Before entering hiatus the band had begun performing a host of new material at shows, including "Sticks and Stones", "Secrets", "Smartest Clown" and "Jeremy".

In October 2012, the band reformed to perform two sold out dates at Flairz Retro Bar in Hastings. Following the two shows, in February 2013 the band began teasing a further comeback over Twitter, before formally announcing their return along with plans to release new material, starting with a track titled "Technicolour", with singer James New declaring "everything's ready to go and we hope to have something for your ears in the next couple of months. To whet your appetite until that time, here is a little acoustic number called Technicolour."

On 15 April the band released their new track "Technicolour" as an EP on Bandcamp along with a second new track "Your Father's Son" and a previously unreleased track from the These Things Move In Threes recording sessions, titled "Ho Hey!". "Technicolour" was first written in 2007, but wasn't recorded until 2013 by James New in his home studio after the announcement of the band's return "stirred some public interest, frankly a lot more than I expected". New described the "Technicolour" EP as a "taster", and that more material would be recorded as a full band at a later date. On 20 September 2013 the band released their first track as a full, reformed band, titled "Jeremy".

The band performed their third show since reforming on 1 November 2013 to a sold-out audience at The Barfly, Camden. On 17 February 2014 the band released Back to the Shore, an EP with eight tracks; "Goodbye", "Lizzy Lu", "Last Look", "Make Pretend", "Technicolour", "Sticks & Stones", "Jeremy" and "Chasing Footsteps", which had been originally conceived before the 2008 hiatus, for the band's second album. On 25 July, the band performed their final show the run at Acoustic Lakeside Festival in Austria.

=== 2019-present: Second reformation, Rarities collection and new singles ===
In August 2019, the band reformed to perform two sold-out shows in Brighton and London. Following the two shows, the band went on to announce a 8-date tour of the UK for April 2020, however the tour was ultimately cancelled due to the COVID-19 pandemic.

On 20 February 2020, the band announced via their social media that they had put together a compilation titled Rarities, which would be available to stream on March 20. Rarities compiles most of the b-sides and one demo from their album These Things Move in Threes, along with two tracks from their 2014 EP Back to The Shore and does not contain any new or unreleased material.

The band came together in 2020 to write and record a new track, titled "Summer". The track premiered via podcast on 11 March, with a full release planned for 3 April. The track received its first radio play on March 17 through BBC Music Introducing, with it being revealed they'd release more new music in June and October 2020.

In November 2025, the two James's from the band appeared in the identity parade of Never Mind the Buzzcocks

== Members ==
- James "Noo" New – lead vocals, synthesisers, keyboards, guitar, tambourine
- James "Tate" Arguile – guitar, vocals
- Niall Buckler – bass, vocals
- Oli Frost – guitar, vocals
- Gareth "The Rock" Jennings – drums
- Matthew - duck
- Tommy "B" Bowen – synthesisers, keyboards, vocals (session & touring 2006–2008, official member 2012–present)

== Discography ==
Albums

- These Things Move in Threes (2007)

Compilations

- Rarities (2020)

EPs

- The Dance in France (self-released 8 track EP 2005)
- The Dance on the Shore (self-released 8 track EP 2006)
- What Would Steve Do? (self-released 7", April 2006)
- Black Hurts Day and the Night Rolls On (CD + 10", July 2006)
- Technicolour (self-released 3 track EP, April 2013)
- Back to the Shore (self-released 8 track EP, February 2014)

Singles

Single	Year	Peak chart positions	Album
Single	Year	UK	Album
"Song B"	2006	—	Black Hurts Day and the Night Rolls On
"Out of the Question"	2006	45	These Things Move In Threes
"What Would Steve Do?"	2007	40	These Things Move In Threes
"She's Got You High"	2007	41	These Things Move In Threes
"Technicolour"	2013	-	Back to the Shore
"Jeremy"	2013	-	Back to the Shore
"Summer"	2020	-	-
"Washout"	2024	-	-
"—" denotes single that did not chart or was not released.

Other contributions

- The Saturday Sessions: The Dermot O'Leary Show (2007, EMI) – "In Between Days"
- (500) Days of Summer (Music from the Motion Picture) (2009, Sire Records) – "She's Got You High"
- Angus, Thongs and Perfect Snogging (Soundtrack) – "She's Got You High"
- The Inbetweeners (Soundtrack) – "She's Got You High"
