= Kevin Jubinville =

Canadian actor (born 1967)

- Occupation: Actor
- Years active: 1992–present

Kevin Jubinville is a Canadian actor known for playing The Shep in Degrassi: The Next Generation and Bob Venton in Rabbit Fall.

== Critical reception ==
In 1989, a review in The Whig Standard in Kingston, Ontario, praised Jubinville's performance in The Investigation, a play by Paul Weiss: "Kevin Jubinville gives a dynamic performance as Boger, an officer completely convinced by Hitler's 'final solution'. Never does the actor sink into the warped stereotype that television and film often give us; his Nazi officer is cool, his anger always controlled, his logic seamless."

== Filmography ==
Year	Title	Role	Notes
1992	Partners 'n Love	Waiter	TV movie
1993	Kung Fu: The Legend Continues	Youth #1	Episode: "A Legend Reborn"
1993	The Hidden Room	John	Episode: "Stark in Love"
1993	Shattered Trust: The Shari Karney Story	Reporter	TV movie
1993	J.F.K.: Reckless Youth	Randall	TV movie
1994	PCU	Carter Prescott	
1994	Forever Knight	Mason	Episode: "A Fate Worse Than Death"
1995	Bach's Fight for Freedom	Prince August	Short film
1995	Net Worth	Fern Flaman	TV movie
1995	Road to Avonlea	Nat Lester	4 episodes
1995	Lonesome Dove: The Outlaw Years	Unknown	Episode: "The Bride"
1996	Kung Fu: The Legend Continues	Unknown	Episode: "Time Prisoners"
1996	Waiting for Michelangelo	Bachelor #4	
1996	Fly Away Home	M.P.	
1996	PSI Factor: Chronicles of the Paranormal	Brian Boswick	Episode: "The Creeping Darkness/Power"
1996	Talk to Me	Unknown	TV movie
1996	F/X: The Series	Russell Mosley	Episode: "French Kiss"
1997	Uncle	Unknown	Short film
1997	No Contest II	Falco	
1998	The Adventures of Sinbad	Carga	Episode: "A City Under Plague"
1998	Power Play	Jeff Maplethorpe	Episode: "Brothers in Arms"
1998	Scandalous Me: The Jacqueline Susann Story	Doug Lacoste	TV movie
1999	Deep in the City	Harry	Episode: "Thicker Than Water"; Episode: "Obsessions"
1999	Ultimate Deception	Benji	TV movie
1999	Total Recall 2070	Kroczek	3 episodes
1999	Prisoner of Love	Scotty	
2000	The Courage to Love	Frank Morgan	TV movie
2000	Common Ground	Veteran	TV movie
2000	A Tale of Two Bunnies	Drunk	TV movie
2000	Finding Buck McHenry	Chuck Axelrod	TV movie
2000	Code Name: Eternity	Unknown	Episode: "Making Love"
2000	Strong Medicine	Unknown	Episode: "Pilot"
2000	The Famous Jett Jackson	Dan Brenner	Episode: "Pilot"
2000	RoboCop: Prime Directives	Damian Lowe	TV mini-series
2000	Twice in a Lifetime	Ethan O'Malley	Episode: "The Frat Pack"
2000	Relic Hunter	Bruce Farrow	Episode: "Afterlife and Death"
2001	Relic Hunter	Wayne Nugent	Episode: "Devil Doll"
2001	Full Disclosure	Carl Smythe	Video
2001	Snap Decision	Ted Jenkins	TV movie
2001	Focus	Mr. Cole Stevens	
2001	Rough Air: Danger on Flight 534	Captain Jack Brooks	TV movie
2001	Mutant X	Todd	Episode: "Meaning of Death"
2001	The Facts of Life Reunion	Tad Warner	TV movie
2001	Jane Doe	Kurt Simmons	TV movie
2001	Leap Years	Detective Phil Logan	5 episodes
2001–2004	Doc	Captain Stephen Doss	19 episodes
2002	Earth: Final Conflict	Moran	Episode: "Subversion"
2002	Fizzy Bizness	Sheriff Dudley	
2002	All Around the Town	Allan Grant	TV movie
2002	Street Time	L. Thompson Baines	Episode: "The Truth Hurts... Bad"
2003	Nightwaves	Pete Naylor	TV movie
2003	Blue Murder	Malcolm Harding	Episode: "Love and Marriage"
2003	Playmakers	Dr. Gatewood	6 episodes
2004	Kevin Hill	Benjamin Harris	Episode: "Snack Daddy"
2005	Ice Princess	Peter	
2005	Suzanne's Diary for Nicholas	Michael	TV movie
2005	Wild Card	Paul Hastings	Episode: "Multiple Personality Fatality"
2006	The House	Frank	
2006	Citizen Duane	Mort McQuillan	
2006	Solar Attack	Brad Stamp	TV movie
2006	Angela's Eyes	Gus Walker	Episode: "The Camera's Eye"
2006	A Lobster Tale	Darryl Stern	
2006	American Pie Presents: The Naked Mile	Hal Michaels	TV movie
2007	Demons from Her Past	Dr. Jeremy Warner	TV movie
2007	Framed for Murder	Nick	TV movie
2007	'Til Death Do Us Part	Ned Morris	Episode: "Time Capsule Murder"
2007	Everything Is Connected	Richard Rauschenberg	Short film
2007	Twitches Too	Aron	TV movie
2007–2008	Rabbit Fall	Officer Bob Venton	14 episodes
2008	Roxy Hunter and the Myth of the Mermaid	Kip	TV movie
2008	For the Love of Grace	Cliff, fiancé of the main character	TV movie
2008–2009	Degrassi: The Next Generation	Principal Sheppard	13 episodes
2009	Degrassi Goes Hollywood	The Shep	TV movie
2009	The Velveteen Rabbit	John, father of the main character	Live action / animated
2009	Flashpoint	Andrew Greenwood	Episode: "The Perfect Family"
2009	Death Warrior	Russell	
2009	7 Diamonds	Radio Announcer	Short film
2009	The Border	Justin Grant	Episode: "Spoils of War"
2010	Turn the Beat Around	Noah	TV movie
2010	Haven	Ted	Episode: "Welcome to Haven"
2011	The Murdoch Mysteries	Roderick Dalewood	Episode 5: "Monsieur Murdoch"
2011	Winging It	Mitch	S02 Ep15: "Lucy in the Sky with Carl"
2016	11.22.63	Car Salesman	Episode 1: "The Rabbit Hole"
