= Odour of Chrysanthemums (film) =

- Directed by: Mark Partridge
- Written by: Novel: D. H. Lawrence; Screenplay: Mark Partridge
- Produced by: Andrea Wallace Grant
- Starring: Geraldine O'Rawe, Geraldine James, Jake McCollough
- Music by: Stephen Daltry
- Release date: 2002
- Running time: 28 minutes
- Country: United Kingdom

Odour of Chrysanthemums is a 2002 short film directed by Mark Partridge and based on the short story by D. H. Lawrence.

== Plot ==
The film tells of a Nottinghamshire coalminer's wife, a young mother, waiting for her husband Walter to come home. She blames his drinking for his absence. It later turns out he has been killed in a pit accident.

Laying out his corpse, after it is brought home from the mine, makes her realize they never really knew each other. Upon the discovery that her husband has died, the protagonist, Elizabeth, is able to remain astonishingly calm and collected, especially in front of her children. In contrast, Walter's mother, who lives near the young couple and their children, becomes deeply emotional.

The presence of pink chrysanthemums throughout the story represents Elizabeth's constant desire for some hint of beauty within her life. One of the miners who brings in Walter's body knocks over the vase of flowers, symbolizing Elizabeth's loss of control over her life.

== Cast ==
- Geraldine O'Rawe as Elizabeth Bates
- Geraldine James as Grandma Bates
- Jake Smith (as Jake McCollough) as John Bates
- Florence Romney-Scriven as Annie Bates
- Bruce Alexander as Elizabeth's Father

== Crew ==
- Director - Mark Partridge
- Producer - Andrea Wallace Grant
- Set Nurse - Helen Smith
- Costume Designer - Wyn Humphreys
- Composer - Stephen Daltry

== Awards ==
The Film won First Prize in the short film category of the Milan Film Festival.
