= Christien Anholt =

English actor

- Born: Christien Alexis Anholt; 25 February 1971 (age 55); London, England, UK
- Occupation: Actor
- Years active: 1988–present
- Father: Tony Anholt

Christien Alexis Anholt (born 25 February 1971) is an English stage, television and film actor best known for portraying Nigel Bailey in the television series Relic Hunter.

== Early life ==
Anholt was born in London. He is the son of Anthony Anholt (19 January 1941 – 26 July 2002) and Sheila Anholt (née Willet), a teacher whom he married in 1964.

== Career ==
He was working as an assistant in the gardening department at his local B&Q store in Chiswick when he received the news that he had landed the role that began his acting career in 1988 in Reunion. He was then cast as 'Leonard / Jeremy Lands' in the Harold Pinter play Another Time. He went on to play 'Marcelus' alongside Mel Gibson in the Franco Zeffirelli film Hamlet (1990). He starred opposite Kate Beckinsale, Sam Neill and Judy Davis in the Hallmark production One Against the Wind, and alongside Stephen Dorff in The Power of One, directed by John G. Avilsden.

His earlier notable film roles include Peter Emery in Stuart Urban's Preaching to the Perverted (1997). In 2021, Anholt played T. S. Eliot in William Nunez's The Laureate depicting the life of British poet and writer Robert Graves.

Steven Spielberg selected Anholt to play Clive Owen's brother in the TV series pilot Class Of '61. He appeared in the BBC's Money For Nothing. He has been featured in Seventeen opposite Rachel Weisz, in Hard Times opposite Richard E. Grant and Sir Alan Bates, and in The Harpist. This was followed by Preaching to the Perverted, The Ruby Ring, and in George Milton's Appetite. Anholt returned to the West End in Terence Rattigan's In Praise of Love and was cast by Harold Pinter and director David Jones opposite Pinter himself, in The Hothouse.

In 1999 Anholt was cast as Nigel Bailey in Relic Hunter which ran for three seasons. After that Anholt guest starred in two episodes of Adventure Inc, alongside Michael Biehn, and had a cameo in The Conclave. He appeared opposite James Franco and Jean Reno in the World War One drama Flyboys, and can be seen alongside Thora Birch in Dark Corners. In 2007 Anholt appeared in the movie, Ben 10 Race Against Time, in which he played an alien called 'Eon'. In more recent years he appeared in several short movies such as Severed Garden, Ghosted and Meanders.

In 2014 Anholt returned to the stage and since then he has appeared in numerous plays such as Blue Bird, Wastwater, Dog Ends, Montagu, The Two Faces of Agent Lacey, The Trial of Jane Fonda, and Permanence. He also appeared on the small screen in Doctors and Holby City. He also does voice-over work such as in The Rise and Fall of Hitler.

== Other endeavours ==
=== Philanthropy ===
During the COVID-19 pandemic 2020 UK lockdowns, Anholt took part in Lisa Ross' "Bedtime in Barnes" initiative by the OSO Arts Centre joining local celebrities including Alistair McGowan, Virginia McKenna, Anneka Rice and astronaut Helen Sharman. He was filmed reading four of his favourite children's stories (Pa's Soft Spot by D. A. Ellsworth; One, Two, Three! by Henry Cuyler Bunner; The Owl and the Pussycat by Edward Lear and Jabberwocky by Lewis Carroll) to help support the centre's Crisis Kitchen helping provide 10,000 meals for local people in need and the national initiative launched by Theatres Trust to prevent the permanent closure of hundreds of UK theatres.

=== Advertising ===
In 2017, Anholt was chosen for Dubai Properties JBR's advertising campaign shot in Dubai and Abu Dhabi with billboards seen internationally on tourism sites such as on the Sheikh Zayed Road as well as commercials playing worldwide. The original YouTube upload of the commercial has almost 5 million views as of August 2021.

== Personal life ==
Anholt lives in London.

== Filmography ==
=== Film ===
Year	Title	Director	Role	Notes
1989	Reunion	Jerry Schatzberg	Hans Strauss, as a young man	a.k.a. L'Ami retrouvé in France & Der wiedergefundene Freund in West Germany.
1990	Hamlet	Franco Zeffirelli	Marcellus	
1992	The Power of One	John G. Avildsen	Date at Dinner	
1997	Preaching to the Perverted	Stuart Urban	Peter Emery	
1997	The Harpist	Hansjörg Thurn	Ferdinand Rupitsch	a.k.a. Die Harfenspielerin in Germany.
1998	Appetite (1998 film)	George Milton	Nelson	
2006	Dark Corners	Ray Gower	David Hamilton	
2006	Flyboys	Tony Bill	Higgins	
2021	The Laureate	William Nunez	T. S. Eliot	

=== Television ===
Year	Title	Director	Role	Notes
1989	Doctor Who	Nicholas Mallett	Perkins (The Curse of Fenric: Parts One; Two & Three: 3 episodes)	The Curse of Fenric is the third serial of the 26th season of Doctor Who, which was first broadcast in four weekly parts on BBC1 from 25 October to 15 November 1989.
1991	Casualty	Jim Hill	Jude	Season 6 Episode 1: Humpty Dumpty.
1991	One Against the Wind	Larry Elikann	Maurice Lindell, Mary Lindell's Son	Film on Mary Lindell working for the French Red Cross in occupied France during World War II also starring Judy Davis, Sam Neill and Kate Beckinsale.
1991	Press Gang	Lorne Magory	Donald Cooper / The Clown	Season 3 Episode 4: The Last Word & Season 3 Episode 5: The Last Word: Part 2.
1992	The Blackheath Poisonings	Kenny McBain (creator) & Stuart Orme (director).	Paul Vandervent	Episodes 1, 2 & 3. Mini-series also starring Ian McNeice, Zoë Wanamaker, Judy Parfitt, Patrick Malahide and James Faulkner.
1993	Screen One	Mike Ockrent	Gary Warrell	Season 5 Episode 6: Money for Nothing.
1993	Class of '61	Gregory Hoblit	Terry O'Neil	Film.
1993	Mama's Back	Ed Bye (director) & Ruby Wax (writer).	David	Film also starring Joan Collins, Michael Gambon and Rupert Everett.
1994	Seventeen	Sandra Goldbacher	Rachel Weisz's lifeguard love interest.	Short love triangle drama about a 17-year-old girl, the man she fancies, and her older sister who he fancies.
1994	Hard Times	Peter Barnes	Tom	Episodes 1 & 4.
1996	Cadfael	Herbert Wise	Meriet Ashby	a.k.a. Mystery!: Cadfael in the United States. Season 2 Episode 2: The Devil's Novice.
1996	The 10 Percenters	Doug Naylor	Adrian	Season 2 Episode 4: Runner.
1998	Felicity	Joan Tewkesbury	Paul	Season 1 Episode 5: Spooked.
1997	The Ruby Ring	Harley Cokeliss	Robert Langley	Film also starring Judy Parfitt, Rutger Hauer, Emily Hamilton and Emma Cunniffe.
1998	Nightworld: 30 Years to Life	Michael Tuchner	Derek	Film; a.k.a. 30 Years to Life (Canada: English title).
1999	The Waiting Time	Stuart Orme	Ben Rogers	Film also starring John Thaw, Zara Turner, Mark Pegg, Struan Rodger, Hartmut Becker & Colin Baker.
1999–2002	Relic Hunter	Various	Nigel Bailey (Lead)	66 episodes
2001	The Making of Relic Hunter III	Jay Firestone & Simon MacCorkindale.	Himself	Film: Paramount Domestic Television & CBS Media Ventures broadcast.
2003	Adventure Inc	Mark Roper	Brother John Worth	Season 1 Episode 12: Angel of St. Edmunds & Season 1 Episode 19: The Last Crusader of San Giovanni; a.k.a. Aventure et associés in Canada.
2007	Ben 10: Race Against Time	Alex Winter	Eon - Ben Eon - Yami Ben	Television movie
2014	Doctors	Sasha Ransome	Adam Dobson	Season 16 Episode 86: Love, Honour and Betray.
2017	Holby City	Tracey Rooney	Evan Smith	Series 19, episode 34: Twist of the Knife.
2022; 2024	Malory Towers	Various	Mr. Lacey (Gwendoline Lacey's father).	Recurring role
2025	Father Brown	Paul Gibson	Sir Benedict Gellert	Series 12 Episode 3: The Horns of Cernunnos

=== Shorts ===
Year	Title	Director	Role	Notes
2015	Severed Garden	Gonçalo Almeida	Frank	Also features Elisa Lasowski & Jean Baptiste Fillon.
2016	Ghosted	Neville Pierce	Nigel	Also features Alice Lowe & Ray Panthaki.
2018	Meanders	Tereza Srbova	The Ultimate Lover	Also features Hannah Dean & Rupert Ratcliffe.
2020	Newton's Third	Katie Blamires	Leon Newton	Also features Etta Fusi & Jamie McKie.

=== Voice ===
Year	Title	Director	Role	Notes
2016	Hitler: The Rise and Fall	Stan Griffin	Narrator	Season 1 Episode1: The Opportunist.
2017	Nightmare on Everest	Karen McGann & John Smithson (creative director).	Narrator	Documentary film about the people trapped in the Himalayas following the earthquake which struck Nepal in 2015.
2019	World's Greatest Palaces (Documentary Series).	Sky - Woodcut Media Productions, United Kingdom.	Narrator	10 episodes; titles as follow: Lukshmi Vilas Palace.; Royal Palace of Stockholm.; Peles Castle.; Château de Fontainebleau.; Edinburgh Castle.; Neuschwanstein Castle.; Kensington Palace.; Royal Palace of Caserta.; Schönbrunn Palace.; Hampton Court Palace.

== Theatre ==
=== Actor ===
Year	Title	Author	Director	Role	Venues & Notes
1989	Another Time	Ronald Harwood	Elijah Moshinsky	Leonard "Len" Lands as a young man and Jeremy	Wyndham's Theatre, London
1995	The Hothouse	Harold Pinter	David Jones	Lamb	Chichester Festival Theatre, Minerva Studio and Comedy Theatre, London
2015	Bluebird	Simon Stephens	Tony nominated actor Amanda Root.	Played two different characters.	Tabard Theatre, London. The cast also includes Selina Giles and Mark Griffin.
2016	The Two Faces of Agent Lacey	Selina Giles	Simon Fellows	Billy Lean	Arts Theatre London. Two Shillings & Sixpence Productions.
2016	The Trial of Jane Fonda	Terry Jastrow	Joe Harmston	Buzzy Banks	Park Theatre, London. Anne Archer plays Jane Fonda. Others cast members include Martin Fisher, Alex Gaumond, Paul Herzberg, Ako Mitchell and Mark Rose. Set: Sean Cavanagh; costume: Roberto Surace and lighting: Tony Simpson.
2017	Montagu	Greg Freeman	Ken McClymont	Montagu	Tabard Theatre, London.
2021	The Soldier's Tale	Music by Igor Stravinsky and Libretto by Charles Ferdinand Ramuz.	Barnes Festival Orchestra and James Day conductor.	Devil	Barnes Music Festival, St Mary's Church, Barnes. Shows respected COVID-19 pandemic Government regulations.

=== Director ===
Year	Title	Author	Role	Venues & Notes
2016	Wastwater	Simon Stephens	Actor & Director	Tabard Theatre. The rotating cast included Selina Giles, Mark Griffin, Tom Holloway and Phillipa Peak. Two Shillings & Sixpence Productions.
