= Sidney Fox (disambiguation) =

Sidney Fox may refer to:

- Sidney Fox, American actress
- Sidney Harry Fox (1899–1930), British petty swindler and convicted murderer
- Sidney W. Fox, American biochemist

== See also ==
- Sydney Fox, fictional character
