= Preaching to the Perverted (film) =

1997 film by Stuart Urban

- DVD cover
- Directed by: Stuart Urban
- Written by: Stuart Urban
- Produced by: Keith Hayley
- Starring: Guinevere Turner; Tom Bell; Christien Anholt
- Cinematography: Sam McCurdy
- Edited by: Julian Rodd
- Music by: Magnus Fiennes; Maya Fiennes
- Production companies: Cyclops Vision; PTTP Films
- Distributed by: Entertainment Film Distributors
- Release date: 4 July 1997
- Running time: 100 minutes
- Country: United Kingdom
- Language: English

Preaching to the Perverted is a 1997 British sex comedy-drama film written and directed by Stuart Urban.

The film features Guinevere Turner in her first starring role as Tanya Cheex, a New York dominatrix. Tom Bell plays Henry Harding MP and Christien Anholt plays Peter Emery. In addition, several well-known BDSM performance artists appear, including Chaos Clowns, Luci the Axle Grinder, also known as "Lucifire", Miss Kimberly, The Fetish Nun, Suzi Woodroffe, and Tutu.

The film was originally developed by the BBC, but they later dropped the script, believing it would never be suitable for broadcast on UK TV. However, in April 2004, the film was shown on terrestrial TV in the United Kingdom on BBC One.

The film was banned in the Republic of Ireland by then-film censor Sheamus Smith on 28 October 1997; he also banned the subsequent video release of the film. The trailer caused a mass recall of the rental VHS release of Donnie Brasco (which had been passed as an 18), because the trailer had not been classified. 3,300 copies of that cassette were withdrawn and replaced, with a potential fine of €1000 to stores providing it. A 2003 video release in the United States was cut in order to receive an age rating.

In 2013, the film became the first European feature film to be restored and remastered on crowd-funding site Kickstarter by its fans. The remastered Blu-ray became available in August 2013.

== Plot ==
Henry Harding MP, a British government minister on a moral crusade, hires an inexperienced young computer whiz kid, Peter Emery, who works for a Christian computer company called Holy Hardware, to infiltrate the UK BDSM scene. Harding is set on putting a club called "House of Thwax" run by Mistress Tanya Cheex out of business, and is sure that Peter's secretly videotaped evidence of the club's activities will do the trick. However, the virginal Peter takes a liking to Tanya Cheex and finds himself falling for the Mistress. Amongst the locations used, Layer Marney Tower in Essex plays a pivotal role for a party scene.

== Cast ==
- Guinevere Turner as Tanya Cheex
- Christien Anholt as Peter Emery
- Tom Bell as Henry Harding MP
- Julie Graham as Eugenie
- Georgina Hale as Miss Wilderspin
- Julian Wadham as M'Learned Friend
- Ricky Tomlinson as Fibbin' Gibbins
- Roger Lloyd-Pack as Mr. Cutts Watson
- Sue Johnston as Esmeralda
- Don Henderson as Commander Cope
- Enzo Junior as Lunk
- Glenn Sims as House of Commons reporter

== Reviews ==
"Turner makes Sharon Stone look like a mother superior, fiendish cameos from Tom Bell, Ricky Tomlinson etc. ... put on your mask and enjoy the party. This ballsy British independent deserves respect". Empire Magazine, Jake Hamilton.

"A mesh of glamour and hilarity ... slick, with an excellent cast ... great dialogue". 'Dillie Tante' The Independent on Sunday.

- "The film boasts excellent costumes, good acting and is a great vision of what goes on in a good fetish club. Highly recommended!" Secret Magazine, February 2003.

"Enjoyably offbeat" The Times 27 April 2004 (TV preview).

- "a kind of high-tech, fast-paced, Moulin Rouge for the fetish world...no wonder it was banned in Ireland" Curve Magazine.
- "Original setting ...sumptuous styling ... treat yourself and enjoy" i-D Magazine 1997.
- "...the club scenes all look fabulous: intelligent use of colour and light." Erotic Review, December 2002.
- "Those who actively participate in the S&M lifestyle may enjoy the lighthearted look at the underground fetish scene, but anyone looking for much more than an offbeat sex comedy is going to be woefully disappointed. Preaching to the Perverted lives up to its name by not being able to appeal to anyone but perverts." Qwipster's Movie Reviews, December 2003.

In 2015, The Guardian ranked the film among the top 10 BDSM-related movies. In a 2020 retrospective on depictions of BDSM in cinema, the BFI noted it as featuring a "rare example of a dominatrix presented as a fully fledged character" and that it "makes very explicit the vital importance of consent and boundaries in any sadomasochistic encounter or relationship".

== Awards ==
- Guinevere Turner - 1999 Best Actress Prize, Festival du Jeune Comedien
- 2002 Audience Choice Award, CineKink Festival

== Soundtrack ==
The CD contains:

1. Magnus & Maya – Welcome to the House of Thwax
2. Shimmon & Wolfson – Evil Queen
3. Magnus & Maya – Journey Into Hell
4. Rejuvination – Sycophantasy
5. Magnus & Maya – Postman Always Thrice
6. Mark Broom – The Alien Spoke
7. Magnus & Maya – In Zerbra Suspension
8. The Aloof – Mind
9. Way Out West – Ajare
10. Magnus & Maya – Enlightenment
11. Magnus & Maya – Goodmorning Mistress
12. Magnus & Maya – On Wasteland (Requiem Flagellum)
13. Omni Trio – Who Are You
14. Percy X – Aerobix
15. Amethyst – Futura
16. Magnus & Maya – Grindecontrol Transubmission
17. Magnus & Maya – House of Thwax

== See also ==
- Sadism and masochism in fiction
- Operation Spanner
