= Tanja Reichert =

Canadian actress (born 1980)

- Born: September 19, 1980 (age 44); Vancouver, British Columbia, Canada
- Years active: 1997–2010

Tanja Reichert (born September 19, 1980) is a Canadian retired actress.

== Career ==
She started acting when she was 15 years of age, and she first appeared on TV at 17 years old, when she had the role of "Shelley-Girl #2" in Breaker High for two episodes ("That Lip-Synching Feeling" and "Rooming Violations"); and she has appeared in many more films/programmes since then.

But she is probably most well known for her role in Relic Hunter, when she was Sydney Fox's assistant, Karen Petrusky, for the third and final season.

Reichert has starred in movies like Legally Blonde 2: Red, White and Blonde, as Reese Witherspoon's Delta-Nu sister; in Broken Lizard's Club Dread as Chef Kelly; Head over Heels as the undercover FBI partner of Freddie Prinze, Jr.; and Scary Movie.

Reichert's other notable television series credits include guest starring roles on Poltergeist: The Legacy, Beyond Belief: Fact or Fiction, The Immortal (starring Lorenzo Lamas), and Francis Ford Coppola's sci-fi series First Wave. Most recently, she had roles on the CBS series CSI: Miami, as well as The Chris Isaak Show.

In late 2006 / early 2007 she appeared in MyNetworkTV telenovela Wicked Wicked Games, playing the secretary Jennifer Harrison.

== Filmography ==
Year	Film/TV show	Episode(s)	Character
1997	Breaker High	2 episodes – "Rooming Violations" and "That Lip-Synching Feeling"	Girl #2 / Shelley-Girl #2
1997	The Christmas List (TV)		Suzie (as Tanja Reichart)
1998	Fatal Affair		Mack's Secretary
1998	Loyal Opposition: Terror in the White House (TV)		
1998	Storm Chasers: Revenge of the Twister (TV)		Melanie
1998	Sweet Deception (TV)		Anita Gallagher
1998	Millennium	1 episode – "...Thirteen Years Later"	Ruby Dahl
1998	Perfect Little Angels (TV)		Lois Morgan (as Tanya Reichert)
1998	First Wave	1 episode – "Breeding Ground"	Nikki
1998	The Net	1 episode – "Sample"	Blonde Girl
1999	Requiem for Murder		Lola St. John
1999	Cold Feet	1 episode – "I've Got a Crush on You, Frigidaire"	Trudi
1999	Revenge		TV Reporter
1999	Free Fall		Stewardess Holly Nesbitt
1997–1999	Poltergeist: The Legacy	2 episodes – "Black Widow" and "Unholy Congress"	Sally / Suzanne
1999	Don't Look Behind You (TV)		April Corrigan
2000	Beyond Belief: Fact or Fiction	1 episode – "Caitlin's Candle"	Caitlin
2000	Sanctimony		Eve
2000	Scary Movie		Miss Congeniality
2000	2ge+her	1 episode – "Fat"	Roxy
2000	Seven Days	1 episode – "Olga's Excellent Vacation"	Melissa Torborg
2000	Cameras Rolling: 20 Days on Set (TV)		Herself
2001	The Meeksville Ghost		Isobel Carter/Kate
2001	HRT (TV)		Rebecca
2001	Head over Heels		Megan O'Brien (as Tanya Reichert)
2001	The Immortal	1 episode – "Learning Curve", 2001	Melissa
2001–2002	Relic Hunter	starring role season 3	Karen Petrusky
2001	The Making of Relic Hunter III (TV)		Herself
2003	Legally Blonde 2: Red, White & Blonde		Delta-Nu (uncredited)
2003	CSI: Miami	1 episode – "Hurricane Anthony"	Heather Burton
2004	The Chris Isaak Show	1 episode – "Home Improvement"	Chantal
2004	Club Dread		Kellie
2005	Bad Girls from Valley High		Charity Chase
2005	Kiss Kiss Bang Bang		B-Movie Actress
2005	Desperate Housewives	1 episode – "Color and Light"	Allison
2006	The Iron Man		Dream Girl
2006	One on One	1 episode – "The Reel World"	Sassy
2006	Bottoms Up (V)		Party Girl #1
2006–2007	Wicked Wicked Games	46 episodes	Jennifer
2008	Green Flash		Tina
2008	Valentine	1 episode – "Pilot"	Courtney
2009	2 Dudes and a Dream		April Stevenson
