= Kull the Conqueror =

1997 film by John Nicolella

- Theatrical release poster
- Directed by: John Nicolella
- Screenplay by: Charles Edward Pogue
- Based on: Kull of Atlantis by Robert E. Howard
- Produced by: Raffaella De Laurentiis
- Starring: Kevin Sorbo; Tia Carrere; Thomas Ian Griffith; Litefoot; Harvey Fierstein; Karina Lombard
- Cinematography: Rodney Charters
- Edited by: Dallas Puett
- Music by: Joel Goldsmith
- Distributed by: Universal Pictures
- Release date: August 29, 1997
- Running time: 96 minutes
- Countries: United States; Italy
- Language: English
- Budget: $35 million
- Box office: $6.1 million

Kull the Conqueror is a 1997 fantasy film about the Robert E. Howard character Kull starring Kevin Sorbo and directed by John Nicolella (his final film before his death the following year). It is a film adaptation of Howard's Conan novel The Hour of the Dragon, with the protagonist changed to the author's other barbarian hero Kull. The storyline also bears similarities to two other Howard stories, the Kull story "By This Axe I Rule!" and the Conan story "The Phoenix on the Sword", which was a rewritten version of "By This Axe I Rule!"

The plot sees the barbarian Kull who is made king after killing the previous one in self defense. His kingdom is threatened by the evil witch Akivasha, who seeks to bring forth the armies of hell to restore her dark empire. The film was originally intended to be the third Conan film, Conan the Conqueror but Arnold Schwarzenegger declined to reprise the role as Conan. Sorbo was reluctant to redo a character already played, so the character was changed to Kull. Screenwriter Charles Edward Pogue has stated that he was extremely displeased with this film, feeling that his script was ruined by studio interference. The film re-teams director Nicolella with actor Thomas Ian Griffith, who had worked together in 1989 for the ABC television biopic Rock Hudson. The film received mostly negative reviews from critics and was a commercial failure.

== Plot ==
Kull battles for the right to join Valusia's elite Dragon Legion until being told by General Taligaro that as a barbarian from Atlantis, he will never be allowed to join a legion of 'noble blood'. Taligaro then learns that the Valusian King Borna has gone mad and is slaughtering his heirs, riding to Valusia with Kull following. The confrontation that follows ends with Kull mortally wounding Borna, who with his last breath names Kull his successor, to the dismay of Taligaro and most of the assembled nobles. Soon after, Kull meets his harem and recognizes one of them, Zareta, as a fortuneteller he once encountered, who also foretold his kingship. Kull summons her to his chambers, where she reads the cards and tells him that the fate of his kingdom would depend on a kiss. Kull then attempts to sleep with Zareta, but he dismisses her when she reminds him that she is a slave and acts when commanded.

The next day, Kull attempts to free his slaves, but finds that his rulings are hampered by the stone tablets detailing the laws of Valusia. Taligaro and his cousin secretly attempt to assassinate Kull during his coronation, but fail. Taligaro and his conspirators are summoned the following night by the necromancer Enaros, who offers to aid them by resurrecting Akivasha, the Sorceress Queen of the ancient Acheron Empire, which the god Valka destroyed ages before Valusia was built on its remains. Using Taligaro's group to suit her ends to gain power and restore Acheron, Akivasha uses her magic to enchant Kull and become his queen. Akivasha then places Kull in a deathlike slumber, framing Zareta of "regicide" while taking Kull to her temple to keep as a plaything.

Kull escapes with the help of the Valkan priest Ascalante, Zareta's brother. The pair free Zareta and the trio head north via the ship of Kull's untrusting associate Juba, in the hope of obtaining the Breath of Valka, the only weapon that can stop Akivasha from regaining her full power. Realizing what they are up to, Akivasha sends Taligaro after them; he catches them just as Zareta obtains the Breath, mortally wounding Ascalante and leaving Kull to die. Taligaro reveals his intent to use Zareta to betray Akivasha and take the Topaz Throne. On the day of the solar eclipse, Kull returns to Valusia as Akivasha gradually begins assuming her true demonic form, easily thwarting Taligaro's attempt to kill her with Zareta. After Kull wounds Taligaro and kills Enaros, Zareta kisses Kull and passes the Breath of Valka to him, who kisses the now-fully demonic Akivasha to transmit Valka's Breath and extinguish her flame forever. Kull proceeds to kill Taligaro when he attempts to take Zareta hostage, removing the last opposition to his rule.

After being reinstated as king by the now more amenable nobles, Kull names Zareta his queen, then uses his axe to destroy the Tablets of the Law, abolishing slavery in Valusia and allowing it to be reborn as a kingdom of honor rather than tradition.

== Cast ==
- Kevin Sorbo as Kull
- Tia Carrere as Akivasha
- Thomas Ian Griffith as General Taligaro
- Gary "Litefoot" Davis as Ascalante
- Roy Brocksmith as Tue
- Harvey Fierstein as Juba
- Karina Lombard as Zareta
- Edward Tudor-Pole as Enaros
- Douglas Henshall as Ducalon
- Joe Shaw as Dalgar
- Sven-Ole Thorsen as King Borna
- Terry O'Neill as Ship's Captain
- Pat Roach as Zulcki
- John Hallam as Mandara
- Peter Petruna as Slave

== Reception ==
=== Critical response ===
The film received mostly negative reviews from critics. On Rotten Tomatoes, the film holds a rating of 21%, based on 19 reviews, with an average rating of 3.8/10.

Marc Savlov of the Austin Chronicle gave it 1 out of 5 and wrote that the "fight sequences are a boring blur, and the effects seem to have come straight out of the old Land of the Lost, sans dinosaurs. It's all pretty much of a muddle, and one that neither Sorbo's good looks nor Fierstein's wry wit can save." James Berardinelli of ReelViews gave it 1 out of 4. He says it is "a really bad movie", but says there is some "guilty pleasure to be had from watching something this inane". He credits director John Nicolella with making the best of bad material and concludes "It's been a while since I had this much fun at a one-star movie."

=== Box office ===
The film debuted at No. 9 in its opening weekend, earning $3.5 million from 2,091 theaters. It grossed $6.1 million in the US.

== Reboot ==
It was announced on November 23, 2009, that Paradox Entertainment was rebooting Kull the Conqueror. As of 2026, the film has not materialized.
