= Tia Carrere =

Filipino-American actress (born 1967)

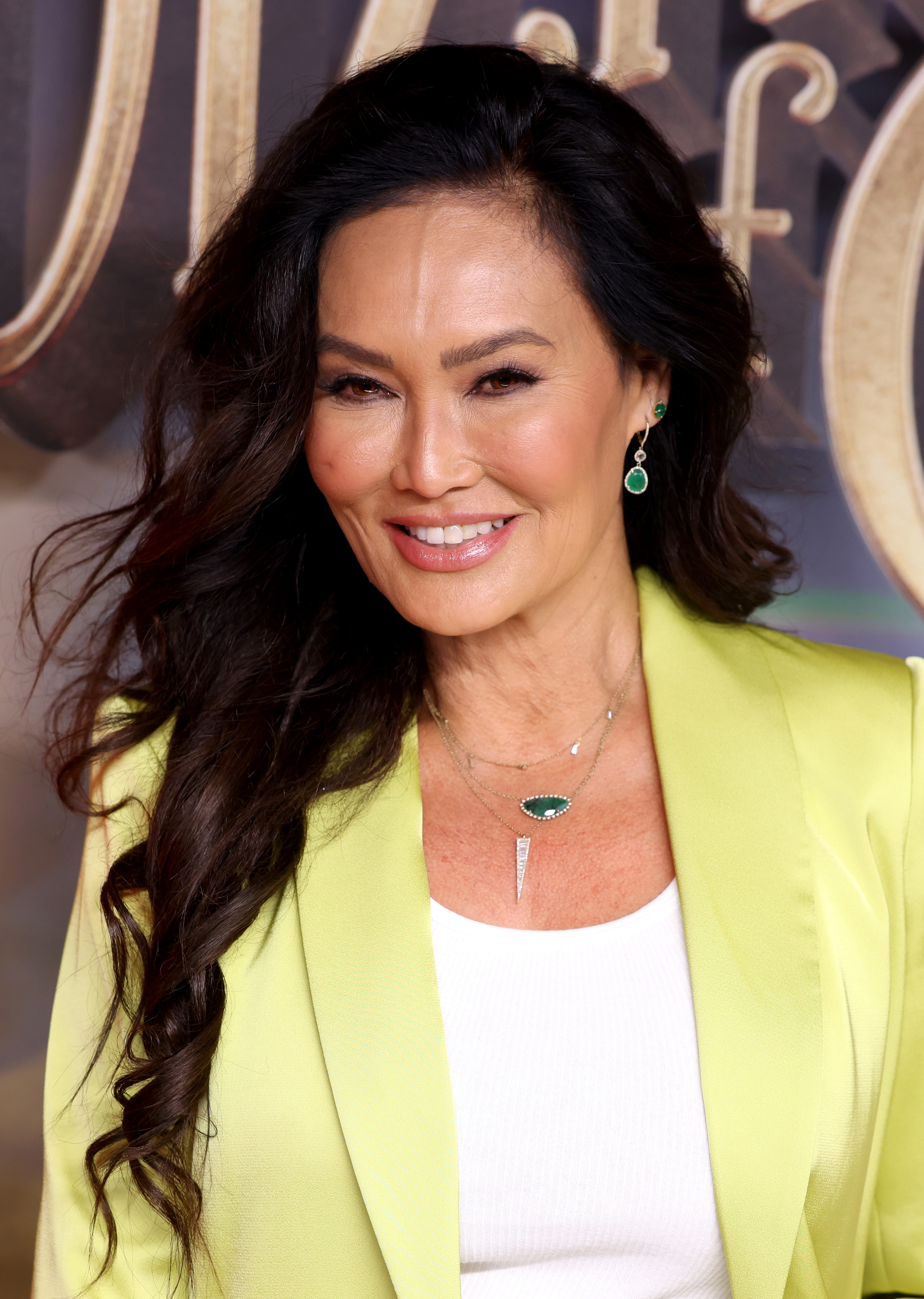
- Carrere in 2025
- Born: Althea Rae Duhinio Janairo; January 2, 1967 (age 59); Honolulu, Hawaii, U.S.
- Occupations: Actress; model; singer
- Years active: 1984–present
- Spouses: Elie Samaha (m. 1992; div. 2000); Simon Wakelin (m. 2002; div. 2010)
- Children: 1
- Musical career
- Genre: Hawaiian
- Instrument: Vocals
- Years active: 1992–present
- Label: Daniel Ho Creations
- Website: tiacarrere.com

Althea Rae Duhinio Janairo (born January 2, 1967), known professionally as Tia Carrere (/kəˈrɛər/), is an American actress and singer who got her first big break as a regular on the daytime soap opera General Hospital.

Carrere starred as Sydney Fox in the television series Relic Hunter, played Cassandra Wong in the feature films Wayne's World and Wayne's World 2; Juno Skinner in True Lies; Nani Pelekai in the Lilo & Stitch animated films and TV series, and Nani's social worker Mrs. Kekoa in the 2025 live-action adaptation; Queen Tyr'ahnee in Duck Dodgers; Richard Lewis' girlfriend, Cha Cha, in Curb Your Enthusiasm; as well as Lady Danger opposite RuPaul in Netflix's AJ and the Queen. Carrere also appeared as a contestant in the second season of Dancing with the Stars and the fifth season of The Celebrity Apprentice. In addition to acting, Carrere has won two Grammy Awards for her music.

== Early life ==
Althea Rae Duhinio Janairo was born in Honolulu, Hawaii. She is the daughter of Audrey Lee Janairo, a computer supervisor, and Alexander Janairo, a banker. She is of Filipino and Chinese descent. Her father was born and raised in Cebu.

Carrere attended Sacred Hearts Academy, an all-girls school. She longed to be a singer as a child. Though she was eliminated during the first round of her 1985 Star Search appearance at the age of 18, she was spotted by the parents of a film producer while shopping at a Waikiki grocery store and was cast in the film Aloha Summer. Around this time, she adopted her stage name by using her sister's nickname for her, "Tia", and a variation of the last name "Carrera" in tribute to actress Barbara Carrera.

== Film and television career ==
Following this success, Carrere returned to Los Angeles, and after working several months as a model, was hired in early 1985 for her first television role, a guest appearance on an episode of the American series Airwolf; the episode aired in November 1985, after her first on-screen television appearance, in a March 1985 episode of Cover Up. Her first major breakthrough was in the daytime soap opera General Hospital, where she played the role of Jade Soong Chung from 1985 to 1987. She had a guest appearance on The A-Team, which was supposed to lead to her joining the cast; her General Hospital obligations, however, prevented her from joining the team, so her character was dropped after one episode, and was never mentioned again. She also made guest appearances on MacGyver as a karate instructor in the episode "The Wish Child" and later as an assassin in the episode "Murderer's Sky". She also appeared on Anything but Love as the adopted daughter of Marty Gold (Richard Lewis), and on an episode of Married... with Children as Piper Bauman, a modelling rival of Kelly Bundy.

After appearing in the 1991 action films Harley Davidson and the Marlboro Man and Showdown in Little Tokyo, she emerged into the public spotlight when cast as Cassandra, a rock singer and love interest of Mike Myers's character, Wayne Campbell, in Wayne's World (1992), a role she reprised the next year in Wayne's World 2. A trained singer, Carrere performed all of her own songs in the first film, and the Wayne's World soundtrack features her vocals. She turned down a role in Baywatch to audition for Wayne's World. In 1992, People named her to its annual "50 most beautiful people" list.

Other roles in prominent films include the parts of wealthy smuggler Juno Skinner in True Lies, a 1994 Arnold Schwarzenegger action film; a mixed African-Japanese computer expert in Rising Sun, a thriller co-written for the screen by Michael Crichton and based on his novel, starring Sean Connery and Wesley Snipes; robber Gina Walker in The Immortals in 1995; and secretary Victoria Chappell in High School High, a 1996 parody. She also starred as Ari, a space marine turned pirate, in the 1995 adventure/puzzle game The Daedalus Encounter. She appeared as the evil witch/queen in the 1997 Universal Films picture Kull the Conqueror, co-starring versus Kevin Sorbo, and starred in late-'90s M&M's commercials as herself. She was also cast as Ana Ishikawa for a planned motion picture of the comic book character Shi, but it went unproduced.

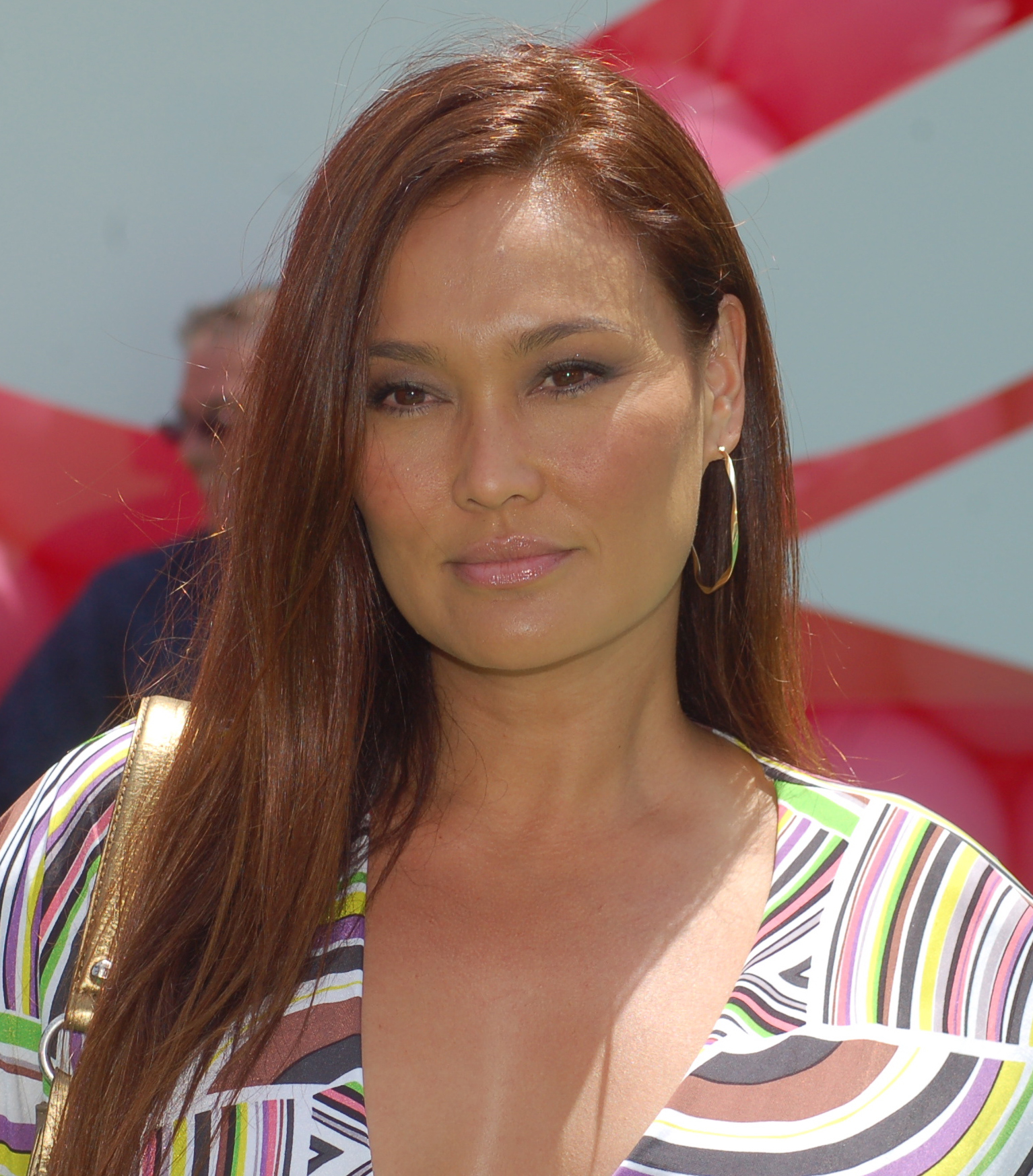
Carrere at the premiere of Up in May 2009

From 1999 to 2002, Carrere starred as archeology professor Sydney Fox in Relic Hunter, a syndicated action-adventure series reminiscent of Indiana Jones and Tomb Raider. At this time, Carrere was featured in the men's magazine Maxim. Relic Hunter lasted for three contracted television seasons. Carrere then provided the voice of Lilo's sister Nani in the animated film Lilo & Stitch (2002) and its sequels and spinoffs through 2006, later returning in the live-action Lilo & Stitch (2025) as a new character named Mrs. Kekoa, who is Nani's social worker in that film. She also provided the voice of Queen Tyr'ahnee in the Duck Dodgers animated series (2003–2005) and Snookie in the 2005 animated film Aloha, Scooby-Doo!.

She participated as a contestant on the popular reality show Dancing with the Stars, and eventually placed sixth overall. Carrere later participated in the fifth season of The Celebrity Apprentice, but her "apprenticeship" to Donald Trump, the "boss" of the show, was terminated in that season's fifth episode.

Carrere posed nude for the January 2003 issue of Playboy. The photos were republished in the German December 2006 issue of the magazine. She has appeared as a guest star on a number of television shows, including Back to You, Nip/Tuck, and Warehouse 13. She has also appeared in several episodes of season six of Curb Your Enthusiasm as Richard Lewis's girlfriend. In 2020, Carrere played Lady Danger in all ten episodes of the Netflix series AJ and the Queen.

== Music career ==
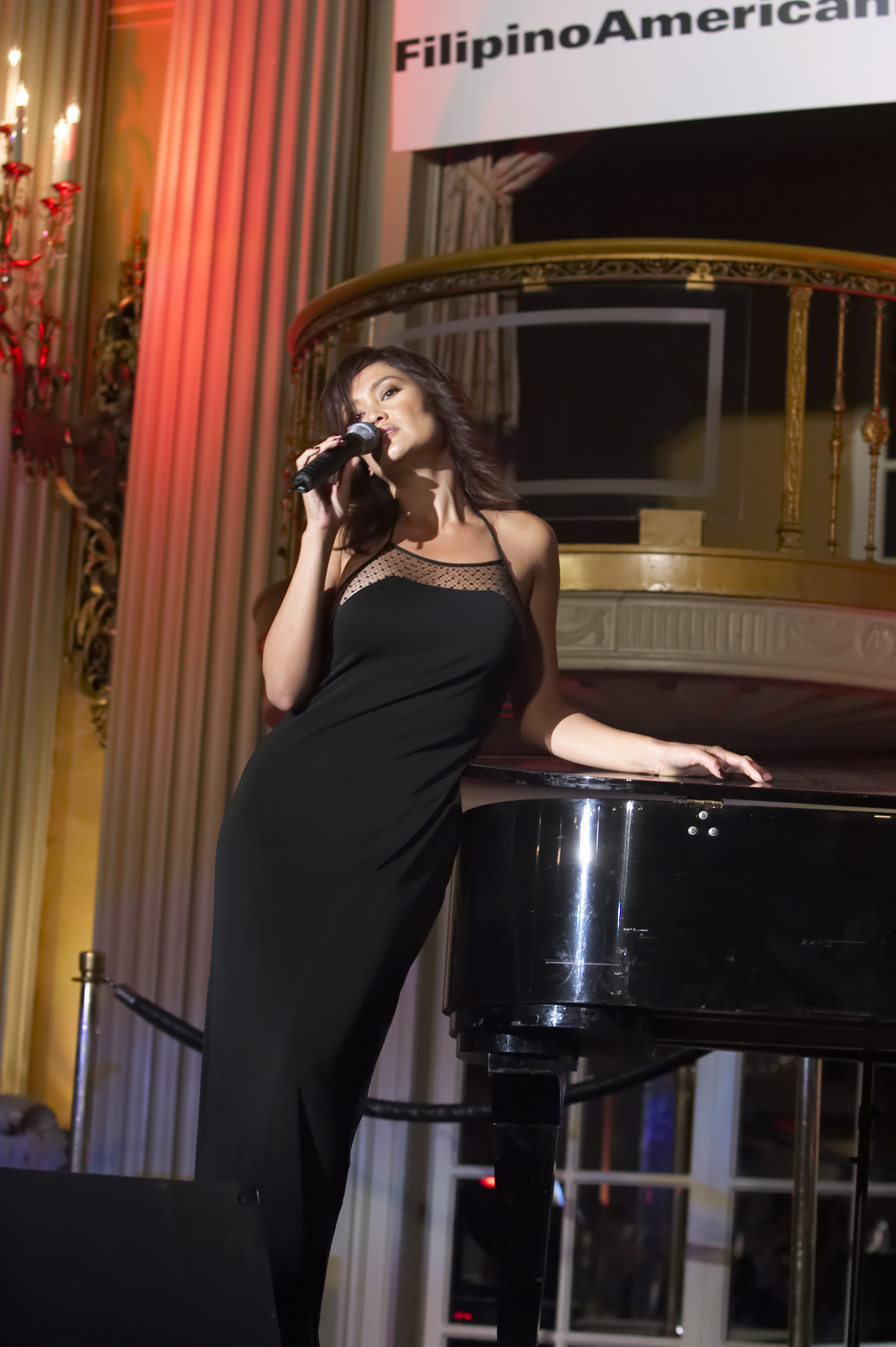
Carrere at the Filipino American Library Spirit Awards (2006)

Carrere also maintains a singing career. In 1993, her first solo album, Dream, produced by Matt Prinz, was released and went platinum in the Philippines. That same year, she was featured on the soundtrack of Batman: Mask of the Phantasm, performing the ending theme, "I Never Even Told You". Carrere then focused on Hawaiian music starting with her second album, Hawaiiana, which was released in June 2007 and featured Grammy Award-winning record producer Daniel Ho accompanying her on slack-key guitar and ukulele. The album was nominated for a 2008 Grammy Award under the category Best Hawaiian Music Album.

In 2009, Carrere served as co-host for the pre-Grammy Awards telecast online event alongside Wayne Brady. She won a Grammy Award in 2009 for her third album, 'Ikena, and her 2010 album He Nani was also nominated for a Grammy. In 2011, she won her second Grammy Award for her album Huana Ke Aloha.

== Personal life ==
Carrere was married to film producer Elie Samaha from 1992 until 2000. On November 30, 2002, she married photojournalist Simon Wakelin, with whom she has a son. On April 2, 2010, Carrere filed for divorce in person at Los Angeles County Superior Court. According to court documents, she cited irreconcilable differences as the reason for the divorce and asked for sole physical custody of their child. Their divorce was finalized in August 2010, with the two reportedly sharing custody of their child. As of 2010, Carrere lives in Los Angeles.

== Filmography ==
=== Film ===
Year	Title	Role	Notes
1987	Zombie Nightmare	Amy	
1988	Aloha Summer	Lani	Acting debut, filmed in 1984
1989	Fine Gold	Stella	
1990	Enemy	Mai Chang	Direct-to-video
1991	Showdown in Little Tokyo	Minako Okeya	
1991	Harley Davidson and the Marlboro Man	Kimiko	
1992	Wayne's World	Cassandra Wong	
1992	Little Sister	Adrienne	
1993	Rising Sun	Jingo Asakuma	
1993	Quick	Janet Sakamoto	Direct-to-video
1993	Treacherous	Dr. Jessica Jamison	Direct-to-video
1993	Wayne's World 2	Cassandra Wong	
1994	True Lies	Juno Skinner	
1995	Jury Duty	Monica Lewis	
1995	The Immortals	Gina Walker	Direct-to-video, also Associate Producer
1995	Hostile Intentions	Nora	Direct-to-video
1996	Hollow Point	Diane Norwood	
1996	High School High	Victoria Chapell	
1996	Natural Enemy	Christina	Direct-to-video
1997	Kull the Conqueror	Akivasha	
1997	Top of the World	Rebecca Mercer	
1998	Scar City	Candy	
1998	20 Dates	Herself	Uncredited cameo, also Executive Producer
1995	My Teacher's Wife	Vicky Mueller	
1999	Five Aces	Karen Haggerty	Direct-to-video
1999	If...Dog...Rabbit		Direct-to-video, co-executive producer
2000	Merlin: The Return	Dr. Joan Maxwell	
2002	Lilo & Stitch	Nani Pelekai (voice)	
2002	Meet Prince Charming	Samantha Feld	
2003	Stitch! The Movie	Nani Pelekai (voice)	Direct-to-video
2005	Aloha, Scooby-Doo!	Snookie, Local Woman (voice)	Direct-to-video
2005	Back in the Day	Loot	Direct-to-video
2005	Lilo & Stitch 2: Stitch Has a Glitch	Nani Pelekai (voice)	Direct-to-video
2006	Leroy & Stitch	Nani Pelekai (voice)	Direct-to-video
2008	Dark Honeymoon	Miranda	Direct-to-video
2009	Wild Cherry	Ms. Jane Haumea	
2010	Hard Breakers	Jodie	
2011	You May Not Kiss the Bride	Lani	
2012	Collision Course	Kate Parks	
2013	Final Recourse	Michelle Gaines	Also associate producer
2014	Gunshot Straight	Leanne	Direct-to-video
2015	Pirates Code: The Adventures of Mickey Matson	Kelly	
2015	Behind Palm Swings	Cherry Bomb	Short film
2015	Tom and Jerry: Spy Quest	Jezebel Jade (voice)	Direct-to-video
2016	Business Unusual	Ella	Short film
2016	Showdown in Manila	Mrs. Catherine Wells	
2016	The Girl	Mother	
2017	Palm Swings	Ms. Cherry Bomb	
2018	The Legend of Hallowaiian	Nana (voice)	Direct-to-video
2022	Easter Sunday	Tita Theresa	
2024	Waltzing with Brando	Madame Leroy	
2025	Lilo & Stitch	Mrs. Kekoa	
2027	The Last Resort	Reyna	Post-production

=== Television ===
Year	Title	Role	Notes
1985	Cover Up	Philippines Contestant	Episode: "Who's Trying to Kill Miss Globe?"
1985	Covenant	Girl at Golden Calf	Television film
1985	Airwolf	Kiki Tinabi	Episode: "Annie Oakley"
1985–1987	General Hospital	Jade Soong	Recurring role
1986	The A-Team	Tia	Episode: "The Sound of Thunder"
1986	MacGyver	Lisa Chan	Episode: "The Wish Child"
1987	Tour of Duty	Lang	Episode: "Dislocations"
1988	Noble House	Venus Poon	Miniseries, 4 episodes
1988	MacGyver	Tiu	Episode: "Murderer's Sky"
1989	The Road Raiders	Cyanne	Television film
1989	Anything But Love	Cey	Episode: "Those Lips, Those Thais"
1990	Friday the 13th: The Series	Michiko Tanaka	Episode: "Year of the Monkey"
1990	Quantum Leap	Chu-Hoi	Episode: "The Leap Home: Part 2 (Vietnam)"
1990	Married...with Children	Piper Bauman	Episode: "Kelly Bounces Back"
1991	Intimate Stranger	Mina	Television film
1992	Tales from the Crypt	Scarlett	Episode: "On a Deadman's Chest"
1995	Nothing But the Truth	Simone Gideon	Television film
1995–96	Murder One	Beverly Nichols	3 episodes
1996	Desert Breeze		Television film
1997	Happily Ever After: Fairy Tales for Every Child	Mija (voice)	Episode: "The Little Mermaid"
1998	Dogboys	District Attorney Jennifer Dern	Television film
1998	Veronica's Closet	Kim	Episode: "Veronica's on the Herb"
1998	Hercules	Marigold (voice)	Episode: "Hercules and the Golden Touch"
1999	The Night of the Headless Horseman	Katrina Van Tassel (voice)	Television film
1999–2002	Relic Hunter	Sydney Fox	Lead role
2003–2005	Duck Dodgers	Queen Tyr'ahnee, additional voices	Main cast
2003–2006	Lilo & Stitch: The Series	Nani Pelekai (voice)	Main cast
2004	Johnny Bravo	Herself/additional voices (voice)	4 episodes
2004	Megas XLR	Darklos (voice)	Episode: "DMV: Department of Megas Violations"
2004	Torn Apart	Vicki Westin	Television film
2005	Supernova	Lisa Delgado	Television film
2005	American Dragon: Jake Long	Yan Yan (voice)	Episode: "Fu and Tell"
2006	The O.C.	Dean Torres	Episode: "The Gringos"
2006	Dancing with the Stars	Herself (contestant)	Season 2, eliminated week 5
2007	Back to You	Maggie	Episode: "A Night of Possibilities"
2007	Nip/Tuck	Mistress Dark Pain	Episode: "Carly Summers"
2007	Curb Your Enthusiasm	Cha Cha	3 episodes
2008	Untitled Liz Meriwether Project	Paula Poland	Television film
2009	CSI: Miami	Jacqueline Parsons	Episode: "Bolt Action"
2010	Warehouse 13	Agent Katie Logan	2 episodes
2011	True Justice	Lisa Clayton	2 episodes
2011	Combat Hospital	Jessica Draycott	Episode: "It's My Party"
2011–2013	Scooby-Doo! Mystery Incorporated	Amy Cavenaugh/Judy Reeves (voice)	Guest (season 1), recurring role (Judy, season 2)
2012	In Plain Sight	Lia Hernandez	4 episodes
2012	The Apprentice	Herself (Contestant)	Series 12, "fired" in episode 5
2013	The Birthday Boys	Herself	Episode: "Cool Machine"
2014	Asteroid vs Earth	Marissa Knox	Television film
2014	Uncle Grandpa	Island Girl (voice)	Episode: "Vacation"
2015	Hawaii Five-0	Makana Kalakauna	2 episodes
2016	Family Guy	Hawaiian Woman (voice)	Episode: "An App a Day"
2017	Mickey and the Roadster Racers	Auntie Olina (voice)	3 episodes
2017	Blue Bloods	Chow Lin	Episode: "The Enemy Of My Enemy"
2018	Stretch Armstrong and the Flex Fighters	Officer Santos/Mechanica (voice)	3 episodes
2019	Dollface	Teresa	Episode: "Fun Friend"
2020	AJ and the Queen	Lady Danger	Main cast
2020	The Eric Andre Show	Herself	Episode: "Named After My Dad's Penis"
2022	A Big Fat Family Christmas	Ivy	Television film
2023	NCIS: Los Angeles	Layla Lewis	Episode: "Sensu Lato"
2023	Never Have I Ever	Dr. Logan	Episode: "... had my dream stolen"

=== Video games ===
Year	Title	Voice role	Notes
1995	The Daedalus Encounter	Ari Matheson	
2006	Saints Row	Lin	
2013	Saints Row IV	Lin	Cut content

== Discography ==
=== Studio albums ===
- Dream (Reprise Records, 1993)
- Hawaiiana (DHC, 2007)
- 'Ikena (with Daniel Ho; DHC, 2008)
- He Nani (with Daniel Ho; DHC, 2009)
- Huana Ke Aloha (DHC, 2010)

=== Soundtracks ===
- Wayne's World: Music from the Motion Picture (1992)
- Batman: Mask of the Phantasm (Original Motion Picture Soundtrack) (1993)

== Dancing with the Stars ==
=== Season 2 performances ===
Week #	Dance / Song	Judges' scores			Result
Week #	Dance / Song	Inaba	Goodman	Tonioli	Result
1	Waltz / "What a Wonderful World"	6	7	7	Bottom two
2	Rumba / "Emotion"	7	8	7	Safe
3	Tango / "Por una Cabeza"	9	8	9	Safe
4	Foxtrot / "Dream a Little Dream of Me"	9	8	8	Bottom two
5	Samba / "No More Tears (Enough Is Enough)"	7	7	8	Eliminated
5	Group Salsa / "Rhythm Is Gonna Get You"	No scores given			Eliminated

== Awards and nominations ==
The following is a list of awards and nominations received by Carrere.

Year	Title	Accolade	Category	Result	Ref
1992	Wayne's World	MTV Movie + TV Award	Most Desirable Female	Nominated	
1994	—N/a	ShoWest Convention Award	Female Star of Tomorrow	Won	
1995	True Lies	MTV Movie + TV Award	Best Dance Sequence (shared with Arnold Schwarzenegger)	Nominated	
1995	True Lies	Saturn Award	Best Supporting Actress	Nominated	
2001	Relic Hunter	ALMA Award	Outstanding Lead Actress in a Syndicated Drama Series	Nominated	
2006	Back in the Day	DVD Exclusive Award	Best Supporting Actress in a DVD Premiere Movie	Nominated	
2007	Hawaiiana	Grammy Award	Best Hawaiian Music Album	Nominated	
2007	Saints Row	Interactive Achievement Award	Outstanding Achievement in Character Performance - Female	Nominated	
2008	Ikena	Grammy Award	Best Hawaiian Music Album	Won	
2009	He Nani	Grammy Award	Best Hawaiian Music Album	Nominated	
2010	Huana Ke Aloha	Grammy Award	Best Hawaiian Music Album	Won	
