= The Harpist =

1999 film

The Harpist is a 1997 British-German drama film directed by Hansjörg Thurn and starring Geraldine O'Rawe, Christien Anholt and Stephen McGann. Its plot concerns a young German who travels to Hamburg to see an Irish harpist whom he has become obsessed with. Its German title is Die Harfenspielerin.

== Partial cast ==
- Geraldine O'Rawe - Rebecca Kennedy
- Christien Anholt - Ferdinand Rupitsch
- Stephen McGann - Henry Kennedy
- B.J. Hogg - Vinz
- John Kavanagh - Puder
- Colin Baker - Father Rupitsch
- Tim Hudson - Otto
- Pax Lohan - Mrs. Brusis
- Barbara Murray - Mrs. Budde
- Robert Beck - Thug
