= Dark Corners =

2006 horror film

- Film poster
- Directed by: Ray Gower
- Written by: Ray Gower
- Produced by: Nigel Thomas
- Starring: Thora Birch; Toby Stephens; Christien Anholt
- Music by: Andrew Pearce
- Distributed by: Shoreline Entertainment
- Release date: 10 May 2006
- Running time: 92 minutes
- Countries: United States; United Kingdom
- Language: English

Dark Corners is a 2006 horror thriller film directed by Ray Gower and starring Thora Birch.

== Plot ==
Birch plays two characters, alternating between them each time she falls asleep, each of whom believes that the other is a dream. The first of them, Karen Clarke, is a mortuary worker who awakes to find that she has injuries which she does not recall receiving, and the second is Susan Hamilton, an office worker who is preparing to undergo artificial insemination. As time passes, Clarke's world becomes increasingly nightmarish, with a corpse coming to life on her table and a serial killer stalking her, and the line between the two worlds becomes increasingly fragile.

== Cast ==
- Thora Birch as Susan Hamilton / Karen Clarke
- Toby Stephens as Dr. Woodleigh
- Christien Anholt as David Hamilton
- Joanna Hole as Elaine Jordan
- Glenn Beck as Mr. Saunders
