= Akivasha =

- Robert E. Howard character

In-universe information
- Alias: "The Woman who never died"
- Species: Vampire
- Gender: Female
- Nationality: Stygian

Akivasha is a female character appearing in the fictional universe of Robert E. Howard's Conan the Barbarian as an undead, a Stygian vampire queen.

== Fictional character biography ==
=== Etymology ===
Akivasha's name is derived from the Egyptian name (Akkaiwasha) for the Achaeans.

=== Origin ===
She was a Stygian princess more than 10,000 years before Conan's time. It is as a vampire that Akivasha later encounters Conan during one of his adventures, attempting to seduce and lure him―in order to drink his blood―with promises of an eternal life and reigning at her side; ultimately she fails in doing so and escapes in the dark corridors of her monumental tomb, snuffing out the lights by magical means and sending after Conan entities which she named "the Sons of Set".

"I am Akivasha! I am the woman who never died, who never grew old! Who fools say was lifted from the earth by the gods, in the full bloom of her youth and beauty, to queen it forever in some celestial clime! Nay, it is in the shadows that mortals find immortality! Ten thousand years ago I died to live for ever! Give me your lips, strong man! [...] Love me [...] Give me of your blood to renew my youth and perpetuate my everlasting life! I will make you, too, immortal! I will teach you the wisdom of all the ages, all the secrets that have lasted out the eons in the blackness beneath these dark temples. I will make you king of that shadowy horde which revel among the tombs of the ancients when night veils the desert and bats flit across the moon. I am weary of priests and magicians, and captive girls dragged screaming through the portals of death. I desire a man. Love me, barbarian!

— Robert E. Howard, The Hour of the Dragon, Chapter 18

Conan was bitten by Akivasha ([...]he felt a sharp pang at the base of his throat. With a curse he tore her away and flung her sprawling across the couch."Damned vampire!" Blood was trickling from a tiny wound in his throat) but did not turn into a vampire in the process later in the story.

Despite her undead state and powers, Conan sensed she could be dealt with and dismembered using his sword, a threat which instantly caused Akivasha to flee on the spot : "Keep away from me or I'll slash you asunder," he grunted, his flesh crawling with revulsion. "You may be immortal, but steel will dismember you."

== Appearances ==
- Hour of the Dragon

Her first appearance at The Hour of the Dragon from Weird Tales (1935-1936).

- Kull The Conqueror

The novelization of the film Kull the Conqueror, written by Sean A. Moore, published by Tor Books.

- Return of Akivasha

The Return of Akivasha: Book One of the Lost Hyborian Tales, written by Timothy Ford Allen

== Appearances in other media ==
=== Film ===
- Kull the Conqueror - the 1997 film is based on The Hour of the Dragon, replacing Conan with Kull and Xaltotun with Akivasha. The character of Akivasha was played by Tia Carrere.

=== Video games ===
In Age of Conan: Unchained, she is a boss in location "Sanctum of the Burning Souls".

=== Comics ===
- Savage Sword of Conan #10 by Marvel, 1976.
- Conan the Cimmerian #15 - The Sorrow of Akivasha by Dark Horse Comics, 2009.
- King Conan: The Conqueror #4 by Dark Horse Comics, 2014.

=== Role-playing game ===
- Dungeons & Dragons Conan Against Darkness!
