= Mr In-Between =

2001 film by Paul Sarossy

- Theatrical poster
- Directed by: Paul Sarossy
- Written by: Peter Waddington; Neil Cross (novel)
- Produced by: Andreas Bajohra; Michael Cowan; Yvonne Michael; Jason Piette; Bob Portal
- Starring: Andrew Howard; Geraldine O'Rawe; Andrew Tiernan; David Calder
- Cinematography: Haris Zambarloukos
- Edited by: Eddie Hamilton
- Music by: Jennie Muskett
- Distributed by: Verve Pictures
- Release dates: 10 September 2001 (TIFF); 3 October 2003 (UK)
- Running time: 98 minutes
- Country: United Kingdom
- Language: English

Mr In-Between (also called The Killing Kind) is a 2001 British crime drama film based on the 1998 novel of the same title by English novelist Neil Cross. The film was directed by cinematographer Paul Sarossy, his only directorial role to date, and the screenplay written by Peter Waddington, who also has a small role in the film.

== Plot summary ==
In 2002, hitman Jon lives a life of relative solitude, until one day he happens upon an old friend, Andy, and is plunged into an unneeded relationship. The truth slowly unravels about Jon and what he does, endangering the lives of those close to him, and Jon is faced with an ultimatum. He must make his most difficult decision ever: whether to save the woman he loves or kill her and the child.

== Cast ==
Actor	Role
Andrew Howard	Jon
Geraldine O'Rawe	Cathy
Andrew Tiernan	Andy
David Calder	Tattooed Man
Mark Benton	Phil
Clive Russell	Mr Michaelmas
Saeed Jaffrey	Mr Basmati
Clint Dyer	Rickets
Peter Waddington	Priest
Gina Yashere	Dancing Woman
Perry Benson	Nelson
Al Hunter Ashton	Fat Dave
Brian Hibbard	Gordon

== Production notes ==
UK film poster

- Early on, the film's producers were skeptical about the choice of Paul Sarossy, a first-time director and a Canadian in an otherwise all-British production crew, but eventually agreed he was the best man for the job.
- Sarossy, better known for his work as a cinematographer, wanted to focus on his directing and told cinematographer Haris Zambarloukos not to let him behind the camera, no matter how hard he persisted, for the duration of the shooting.
- In the original screenplay, as well as in the novel, the tattooed man's lair was a large Victorian-style manor; Sarossy wanted something more dismal, and so writer Peter Waddington revised the scenes to take place in the sewers under the streets of London.

== Reception ==
Derek Elley of Variety called it "unevenly acted and scripted". Jamie Russell of the BBC rated it 3/5 stars and called it "commendably ambitious, but only occasionally successful". Alan Morrison of Empire rated it 3/5 stars and wrote that the film becomes more pretentious as time goes on. Total Film rated it 2/5 stars and called it "intense, reflective yarn" that wallows in sadism. Time Out London called it bleak, stylistically bold, and occasionally pretentious. David Johnson of DVD Verdict called it "a refreshingly original take on the hitman-with-a-conscience gig." Glenn Erickson of DVD Talk called it "an overachieving straight-to-video feature" that treats its subject matter as more important than it is.

=== Awards ===
Mr In-Between won Best UK Feature at Raindance Film Festival. Andrew Howard won Best Actor at the Tokyo International Film Festival.
