= Sydney Fox =

- First appearance: Buddha's Bowl
- Last appearance: So Shall It Be
- Portrayed by: Tia Carrere; Cassie Steele (young)

In-universe information
- Gender: Female
- Occupation: Archaeologist
- Nationality: American

Sydney Fox is the title character on the Canadian adventure television series Relic Hunter, played by Tia Carrere. Fox is a university professor of ancient studies, teaching courses on archaeology and cultural anthropology. She also has a side-career as a relic hunter, searching for ancient treasures and artefacts which she intends to bring to her university's museum.

== Relic Hunter ==
In the TV series Relic Hunter, Sydney Fox is a Professor of Ancient Studies, at a generic North American university. She most often teaches courses on what appear to be archaeology and cultural anthropology, though she is also shown teaching history and architecture as required by the plot. She frequently misses her own classes to work as a "relic hunter" who is constantly on the hunt for ancient treasures and artefacts so that she can bring them to their university’s museum. Inspired by an Indiana Jones style of adventure, Fox is often found battling rival hunters for artefacts. Her supervisors only rarely complain, since Fox usually stores the relics she finds in the university museum for safekeeping. Fox herself regards it as her duty to keep relics from falling into the wrong hands, either because they should be enjoyed by all mankind or because they are too dangerous to fall into the wrong hands.

Sydney's weapon of choice is a Persian hand-crossbow, which she usually uses to deal with traps, relying on hand-to-hand combat when actually fighting.

The series has attached a number of stereotypes onto her role as an Archaeologist throughout the series. Producers of Relic Hunter have utilized sex appeal to enhance Sydney Fox's character. Fox enjoys the rush of a dangerous mission, as she is unafraid of anything and is a good example of a strong and brave woman. Throughout the television series Fox's clothing is often tight fitting and revealing which makes her easily identified as a feminine sex symbol. With the exotic styles and accessories, Fox portrays a picture of a glamorized archaeologist. This image may be misleading to the reality of the field, yet proves to be more appealing for viewers. In a few episodes, Sydney is actually shown conducting conventional excavations, though she abandons the digs in question once it becomes apparent that the answers she needs are in a nearby sacred cave or ruined temple.

Fox has an on-screen connection with Nigel Bailey. This connection is apparent through the emotional and physical bond they share as they work closely together. The storyline romanticizes and draws on an exotic setting in some episodes.

Episode 1 ("Buddha's Bowl") shows us Sydney Fox in her primary setting as a college professor. In the classroom, Fox expresses her teachings and love for her studies through a series of inappropriate class lessons. An example of this is in the first episode where her seductive dance moves and sexual tendencies are used to educate the students on tribal rituals Fox's initial first impression on Nigel had certainly caught his attention. As she stripped out of her ritual clothing and back into her office attire, the newly introduced teaching assistant is shown admiring her body as he attempts to remain in conversation, despite his obvious sense of hesitation and mesmerisation.

== Popular culture and archaeology ==
Archaeology as a field of study has often been incorrectly portrayed by popular culture and mass media. False stereotypes glamorise it with the use of violence and thrill. Relic Hunter is an example of how a profession can be altered to fit public interests. Although Relic Hunter has faults in its portrayal of the profession, the overall concept of searching for relics and uncovering historical archives is relevant. While Fox is portrayed as a young professional to the field, her sex appeal is used to intrigue viewers and place a different spin on a female archaeologist/professor. Like real archaeologists, Fox does not hunt relics for glory or monetary gain, but so that they can be studied and learned from.

== Setting ==
The show takes place in a variety of different settings across the globe; therefore its archaeological appeal can be interesting for a wide range of viewers. As the episodes follow Fox on different "hunts", the theme of the adventurous archaeologist searching for treasures is rampant throughout the series. The three seasons of Relic Hunter were created to have a multitude of different settings. Themes such as violence and the notion of discovery are intertwined with a sense of romance between characters Fox and Bailey. The idea of danger constantly being within hands reach makes the series both exciting and enticing to watch. This is a popular trend in contemporary archaeology programs.

Yasmin Jiwani argues that Fox "represents the quintessential assimilated Asian American woman."
