= Relic Hunter =

Canadian television series

- Title card
- Genre: Mystery; Fantasy; Action; Adventure
- Created by: Gil Grant
- Starring: Tia Carrere; Christien Anholt; Lindy Booth; Tanja Reichert
- Composer: Donald Quan
- Countries of origin: Canada/France (co-production, seasons 1–2); Canada/United Kingdom (co-production, season 3)
- Original language: English
- No. of seasons: 3
- No. of episodes: 66 (list of episodes)

Production
- Executive producers: Jay Firestone; Adam Haight; Jeff F. King
- Producers: John Ryan; Gerard Crocé; Ken Gord; Jonathan Hackett
- Running time: 42–44 minutes
- Production companies: CHUM Television; ProSieben Media AG; M6; Gaumont Télévision (1999–2000) (season 1); Fireworks Entertainment; Paramount Domestic Television; Amy International Productions (2001–2002) (season 3); Farrier Ltd. (2001–2002) (season 3)

Original release
- Network: First-run syndication (1999–2002)
- Release: September 25, 1999 – May 20, 2002

Relic Hunter is a Canadian adventure television series, starring Tia Carrere and Christien Anholt.

Professor Sydney Fox (Carrere) is a globe-trotting "relic hunter" seeking ancient artifacts to return to museums or the original owner's descendants. She is aided by her linguistic assistant Nigel and occasionally by her secretary Claudia (Seasons 1 and 2) or Karen (Season 3). She often battles rival hunters seeking artifacts for monetary gain. The series includes fantasy and science fiction elements, with relics featuring supernatural powers or unusually advanced technology.

It ran for three seasons in the United States between 1999 and 2002, fulfilling its initial three-season, 66-episode contract, which was not renewed. It aired on Sky1 and subsidiary channels in Ireland and the United Kingdom, while in Canada, it aired on CityTV and Space, CTV's sister network A-Channel and Showcase. The series was shot in the Toronto area and includes local landmarks. As of July 2023, the series airs on the Heroes & Icons cable network.

== Overview ==
Relic Hunter follows the globe-trotting adventures of unorthodox American archaeologist Sydney Fox (Tia Carrere), and her reserved British assistant Nigel Bailey (Christien Anholt). They are assisted at their home base (an American university identified as Trinity College) by student secretary Claudia (Lindy Booth), the spoiled and fashion-conscious daughter of a major donor to the college. The character of Claudia was replaced in the third season by Karen Petrusky (Tanja Reichert), who is more capable in dealing with bureaucracy.

Each episode begins with a flashback of an artifact in its original time before being lost, stolen or hidden. Then in the present day Sydney and Nigel are asked by some person or agency to find the relic. Most episodes feature the duo traveling the globe hunting for clues to find the artifact. Complications abound, with rival relic hunters giving Sydney a chance to use her martial arts. Each episode ends with a scene at Trinity College explaining what has happened to the relic.

Nigel shows an artifact to Sydney. This file has been proposed for deletion and may be deleted after Wednesday, 25 November 2026. Click on file page link to object.

== Cast and characters ==
=== Main ===
- Tia Carrere as Sydney Fox: a Professor of Ancient Studies at Trinity College, skilled in martial arts and self-defense.
- Christien Anholt as Nigel Bailey: Sydney's reserved British teaching assistant who accompanies Sydney on her travels. The producers describe Nigel as a "younger Hugh Grant". Anholt says Sydney is the female Indiana Jones and his character the English sidekick.
- Lindy Booth as Claudia: Sydney's office assistant who helps Sydney and Nigel from the campus whilst they are abroad. She is daughter of a major donor to the school. She sometimes organizes creative solutions to Sydney's and Nigel's travel difficulties, and occasionally joins them in the field.
- Tanja Reichert as Karen Petrusky (Season 3): Claudia's replacement; more serious but also willing to use her attractiveness to get the job done.

=== Recurring ===
- Tony Rosato as Stewie Harper (Episodes 1, 8, 21): Relic hunter who has a love-hate relationship with Sydney
- Thomas Kretschmann as Kurt Reiner (Episodes 6, 12): A rival relic hunter and former flame of Sydney Fox. Sarcastic, arrogant and charming.
- Louis Mandylor as Derek Lloyd (Episodes 7, 26, 46): A CIA agent who requires Sydney's help on occasion.
- Lori Gordon as Lynette (Episodes 8, 10), a temp who twice filled in for Claudia
- Elias Zarou as Edward Patel (Episodes 24, 34): Leader of the Cult of Kali
- Nancy Anne Sakovich as Cate Hemphill (Episodes 25, 34, 53; mentioned in 47, 54, 59, 66): An Interpol agent and occasional romantic interest of Nigel
- Crispin Bonham-Carter as Preston Bailey (Episodes 42, 65): Nigel's older brother
- Ravi Steve Khajuriah as Sanjay (Episodes 45, 48): A helpful colleague of Karen's
- Simon MacCorkindale as Fabrice De Viega (Episodes 47, 58, 66): Sydney's enemy who killed her mentor Alistair Newell when she was ten. MacCorkindale was co-executive producer for the third season.

== List of episodes, relics, and locations ==
No.	Title	Relic	Flashback	Flashback location	Other locations
1	“Buddha’s Bowl”	Buddha’s alms bowl	523 BC	Nepal	Hong Kong
2	“Smoking Gun”	Al Capone’s diamond-encrusted gun	1930	Chicago	United States
3	“The Headless Nun”	Remains of Sister Evangeline	17th C.	Nova Scotia	Canada
4	“Flag Day”	Pioneer's Bear Flag of California	1846	California	United States
5	“Thank You Very Much”	Lost guitar of Elvis Presley	1960	Germany	Germany
6	“Diamond in the Rough”	Magical glove of former baseball great Jimmy Jonesboro	1946	Fenway Park, Boston	United States
7	“Transformation”	Paracelsus scrolls	1946	Salzburg, Austria	Peru
8	“Etched in Stone”	Treasure of legendary Viking Jann the Bold	935	Northumbrian Coast	Sweden
9	“The Book of Love”	Casanova’s Book of Love	1749	Casanova’s Hideaway, Italy	Italy
10	“The Myth of the Maze”	Minotaur’s maze	3000 BC	Athens	Greece
11	“Irish Crown Affair”	Lost crown of the last King of Ireland	1000	Ireland	Dublin
12	“The Emperor’s Bride”	Coffin of the bride of a Chinese Emperor	1000 BC	Huang River, China	Alaska
13	“Afterlife and Death”	Diamond of Thutmose III	1425 BC	Egypt	Amsterdam
14	“Nine Lives”	Statue of the cat goddess Mafdet	1895	Egypt	New York
15	“Affaire de Coeur”	Rings that belonged to lovers, Callum and Elena	1430	Scotland	Scotland
16	“A Vanishing Art”	Scepter of the Kingdom of Hungary	1897	Budapest	Atlantic City
17	“A Good Year”	Crown jewels of France	1792	Paris	France
18	“The Last Knight”	Templar Grand Master's sword of Jacques de Molay	1300	Paris, circa	France
19	“Love Letter”	Records proving a secret marriage on the eve of the French Revolution	1789	Village South of Paris	France
20	“Possessed”	Zeus’ sacred sundial	14th C.	Libya	Brussels
21	“Nothing but the Truth”	Ruby Chalice of Truth	1534	The Barbary Coast	Paris
22	“Memories of Montmartre”	A tiara known as the Heart of Europe	1930s	Moulin Rouge	France
23	“The Put Back”	Idol from the Temple of Woot	100	Kuba, Africa	Democratic Republic of the Congo
24	“Dagger of Death”	Dagger of Kali	500	Temple of Kali, India	Calcutta and Kashmir
25	“Last of the Mochicas”	Vessel believed to contain the Great Warrior Spirit of the Mochicas	662	South America	Peruvian jungle
26	“The Legend of the Lost”	The Kai Nomata (lost tribe)	4800 BC	Vanuatu Islands	New Guinea
27	“Fertile Ground”	Idol of Lono	1779	Hawaii	Madagascar
28	“Gypsy Jigsaw”	Crown of the Romani people	1830	Romania	Bucharest, Romania
29	“Three Rivers to Cross”	Jade Empress	1245	Three Rivers, China	Hong Kong and Three Parallel Rivers of Yunnan, China
30	“Roman Holiday”	Caesar’s breastplate	44 BC	Rome	Italy
31	“Cross of Voodoo”	Haitian Cross of Utu	late 18th C.	Haiti	New Orleans
32	“Lost Contact”	Sacrificial bowl	1824	Burma	Myanmar
33	“The Reel Thing”	Relics of Egyptian Pharaoh Amun II	1516 BC	Egypt	England
34	“M.I.A.”	Faberge egg	1886	St. Petersburg, Russia	New York City, several clips from other episodes
35	“Out of the Past”	Cleopatra’s necklace	30 BC	Egypt	Alexandria, Egypt
36	“Eyes of Toklamanee”	Eyes of Toklamanee	1605	Mississippi Valley	St Louis
37	“Run Sydney Run”	Sword of Ateas	339 BC	Ural Steppes	Russia
38	“French Connection”	Prophecy of Nostradamus	1600	Church Of Cordiers Salon	France
39	“Don’t Go Into the Woods”	Golden Falcon of Maribor	1711	Carpathian Mountains	Ljubljana, Slovenia
40	“Midnight Flight”	Ruby-encrusted scepter of Gunther the Brave	Circa 400	Germania	Luxembourg and Paris
41	“The Executioner’s Mask”	Executioner's Mask	1789	Bourg, France	Paris
42	“The Royal Ring”	Ring of Anne Boleyn	1536	Tower of London	London, Leeds Castle in Kent, England
43	“Set in Stone”	Magical sword of St. Gabriel	1595	Balaton, Hungary	Balaton, Hungary
44	“Deadline”	First Christian Tau cross	1099	Jerusalem	Paris
45	“Wages of Sydney”	Chinese dragon’s egg	1359	Quan Shu Fortress, Manchuria	New York, USA and Quan Shu, China
46	“Mr. Right”	Bowl of Parvati	1459	Bali, Indonesia	Singapore
47	“Sydney at Ten”	Egyptian necklace of Tutankhamun	1981 (Note: In the episode "Sydney at Ten", the flashback is listed as "20 years ago")	St. Beatrice's School	Turkey
48	“The Light of Truth”	Light of Truth lamp	843	Arabia	Morocco
49	“Treasure Island”	The treasure of Treasure Island	1790	The Spanish Main	South Seas
50	“Star of Nadir”	Star of Nadir jewel	1423	Palace of the Talibs, Endostan	The ruins of Azir, Endostan
51	“Vampire’s Kiss”	Vampire chalice	1720	Czechoslovakia	Prague, Czech Republic and Târgovişte, Romania
52	“Devil Doll”	Cursed Aztec Devil doll	1488	Meso-America	Central America
53	“Incognito”	Lancet which causes anyone cut with it to gain incredible strength	1522	New Guinea	Papua New Guinea, Lisbon, Portugal and Valletta, Malta
54	“All Choked Up”	Statue of Athena	800 BC	Greece	Skyros Island, Greece
55	“Warlock of Nu Theta Phi”	Wicca amulet	1692	New England Colonies	Harper's Wood (near Trinity College)
56	“Women Want to Know”	Statue of Ganesha	1075	Southeast Asia	Gamoran Heights
57	“Fire in the Sky”	Extraterrestrial artifact	1398	Pacific Northwest	Okanagan Mountains (Washington state)
58	“Hunting with the Enemy”	Urn containing the ashes of Confucius	1952	Cambodia	Rayong Province, Thailand
59	“Antianeirai”	Belt of Hippolyte	1200 BC	Asia Minor	Istanbul, Turkey
60	“Under the Ice”	Anasazi mummy	1355	Arctic Circle	Ikaulat Airfield, Arctic Station Peary
61	“Arthur’s Cross”	Cross of King Arthur	455	England	Tintern Abbey and Chepstow Castle, Chepstow, Wales
62	“Faux Fox”	Crown jewels of Charles IV of Spain	1808	Royal Palace, Madrid	Seville, Spain
63	“Pandora’s Box”	Pandora's box	422	An-Najaf, Persia	(Note: In "Pandora's Box", there is a will reading for Mac Hollingsworth but the location is not disclosed.)
64	“The Warlord”	Kahina's Saddle	1401	Bekkastan	Bekka-la Sherideen Valley
65	“Fountain of Youth”	Water from the Fountain of Youth	1521	Pascus Florida, West Indies	Seville, Spain and Cotswolds, England
66	“So Shall it Be”	Keys to Stonehenge	121	Stonehenge, England	Bristol, England

== Production ==
The show and character was designed around Carrere, her skills and interests. It was intended to be a light-hearted adventure series. The episodes were filmed mainly in and around the Toronto area where there were lots of places that could stand in for locations around the world. The final six episodes of the first season was filmed at various locations in France.

Many of the relics were related to some tidbit of historical fact, and a story developed around how it was used, abused, and lost, and how Sydney and Nigel are able to recover it after going through adventures where they have to solve puzzles, evade traps and confront rival hunters and enemies. Carrere would often do her own martial arts stunts.

The "Trinity College" campus scenes were filmed at the St. George campus at the University of Toronto in Canada. Campus landmarks prominently featured throughout the series include Victoria College and the Soldiers' Tower (directly adjacent to Hart House). The "Antianeirai" episode ship scenes were filmed aboard HMCS Haida, the last Tribal Class destroyer in the world, when she was berthed at Ontario Place, in Toronto, Canada. For instance, the scene where Sydney finds the belt was filmed in the forward mess deck. All onboard signage was covered with Russian words. Haida has a red maple leaf on one of her funnels and this was covered with a "bird" design. Anything that would show the ship to be of Canadian, or "western" origin, was removed for the film shoot.

All seasons were filmed in widescreen 16:9 but mainly shown in pan and scan 4/3 as are most of Fireworks Entertainment productions from 2000. The widescreen versions of all seasons are available for viewing at Netflix in Nordics as of 2012.

== International distribution ==
Relic Hunter was broadcast in many countries around the world including:

- Australia "Relic Hunter" (Fox8)
- Austria "Relic Hunter – Die Schatzjägerin" [Treasure Huntress] (ATV+)
- Belgium "Relic Hunter" (VT4)
- Bosnia & Herzegovina "Lovac na blago" (FTV)
- Brazil "Caçadora de Reliquias" (RecordTV, Rede Família and Rede Bandeirantes)
- Bulgaria "Търсач на реликви" (AXN), "Ловци на реликви" (TV7 and Super 7) - July 16, 2010 and "Търсачи на реликви" (BNT 1) - June 17, 2019
- Croatia "Pustolovine Sydney Fox" (NOVA)
- Cyprus "Sydney Fox Adventures" (Sigma TV)
- Czech Republic "Lovci pokladů" (Nova, Prima, AXN)
- Denmark "Relic Hunter" (Kanal 5)
- Estonia "Aardekütt" (Kanal 11)
- Finland "Aarteenmetsästäjä" (Nelonen, TV5/The Voice)
- France "Sydney Fox, l'aventurière" [Adventuress Sydney Fox] (M6, W9, Gulli)
- Galicia, Spain "Cazatesouros" (TVG)
- Georgia "რელიქვიების მაძიებელი" (GPB)
- Germany "Relic Hunter – Die Schatzjägerin" [Treasure Huntress] (Pro7, AXN, Kabel Eins, Tele5)
- Greece "Sydney Fox Adventures" (Star Channel, Alter Channel)
- Hungary "Az elveszett ereklyék fosztogatói" [Raiders of the Lost Relics] (TV2 and now AXN)
- India "Relic Hunter" (AXN)
- Israel "אוצרות מן העבר" [Treasures From the Past] (AXN and now HOT Zone)
- Italy "Relic Hunter" (Italia 1) (Paramount Channel (international))
- Latin America "Relic Hunter" (AXN)
- Netherlands "Relic Hunter" Yorin
- New Zealand "Relic Hunter" TV2
- Norway "Skattejegerne" [Treasure Hunters] (TV Norge)
- Poland "Łowcy skarbów" [Treasure Hunters] (TV4)/"Zagadki z przeszłości" [Mysteries of the Past] (AXN)
- Portugal "A Caçadora de Reliquias" (Sony Entertainment Television)
- Romania "Vanatorii de comori"(AXN, TVR 2)
- Russia "Охотники за древностями" (CTC)
- Serbia "Ловац на благо" (FOX)
- Slovakia "Lovkyňa Tajomstiev" (Markíza, Joj)
- Slovenia "Lov za zakladom" (Kanal A)
- South Africa "Relic Hunter" (SABC)
- Spain "Cazatesoros" (Telecinco)
- Sri Lanka "Relic Hunter" (ITN)
- Sweden "Kultjägarna" (Kanal 5)
- Taiwan "奪寶女英豪" (AXN)
- Turkey "Gizem Avcısı" (Tv8 (Turkey), TRT, Olay TV )
- Ukraine "Мисливці за старовиною" (ICTV) / "Мисливці за реликвіями" ([K1]; 2+2)
- United Kingdom Sky1, Sky2, Sky3, Pick "Relic Hunter"
- Vietnam "Truy tìm cổ vật" [Finding Treasures] HTV7

== Home media ==
Alliance Home Entertainment has released all three seasons of Relic Hunter on DVD in Region 1 (Canada only).

In Region 4, Warner Home Video released season 1 on DVD in Australia in two volume sets in 2005. Madman Entertainment subsequently acquired the rights and released the second season on DVD in 2006 and the third season in 2010. A complete Season 1 box set was released by Madman on February 2, 2011.

DVD Name	Ep#	Release Dates	
DVD Name	Ep#	Region 1 (CAN)	Region 4
Season 1	22	April 20, 2010	February 2, 2011
Season 2	22	May 18, 2010	June 21, 2006
Season 3	22	June 8, 2010	June 2, 2010

== See also ==
- Bonekickers
- Veritas: The Quest
