= Geraldine O'Rawe =

Northern Irish actress

- Born: 4 March 1971 (age 55); Belfast, Northern Ireland
- Occupation: Actor
- Spouse: Paul Sarossy

Geraldine O'Rawe (born 4 March 1971) is an Irish actress.

O'Rawe was born in Belfast, Northern Ireland. She studied at the Webber Douglas Academy of Dramatic Art in London in 1989 and made her television debut in the series Final Run in 1988. She returned to the London stage, then appeared in an episode of The Young Indiana Jones Chronicles and the TV movie The English Wife.

She was cast in the role of Eve Malone in the 1995 film Circle of Friends alongside Minnie Driver and Saffron Burrows. She followed this in 1996 with the lead role in the film Mariette In Ecstasy and a supporting role in Some Mother's Son. Since then, she has appeared in Resurrection Man (1996), The Harpist (1999), Disco Pigs (2000), Mr In-Between (2001) and Adoration (2008).

She is married to the Canadian director and cinematographer Paul Sarossy.

== Selected filmography ==
Year	Title	Role	Notes
1995	Circle of Friends	Eve Malone	
1996	Some Mother's Son	Alice Quigley	
1998	Resurrection Man	Heather Graham	
1999	The Harpist	Rebecca Kennedy	
2001	Mr In-Between	Cathy	
2002	Odour of Chrysanthemums (film)	Elizabeth	
2008	Adoration	Carole	
2019	Mariette in Ecstasy	Mariette Baptiste	
