= List of Relic Hunter episodes =

The following is a list of episodes for the 1999–2002 television series, Relic Hunter. Three seasons consisting of 22 episodes each were broadcast between September 20, 1999, and May 20, 2002. In total 66 episodes were produced.

The series ran in the US as well as both Ireland and the United Kingdom, where it has aired on Sky1 and subsidiary channels, while in Canada, it has aired on Citytv, Space, Showcase, and recently CTV's sister network A-Channel before it was outright bought out by them.

All three seasons have been released on DVD in Region 1 and in Region 4.

Season 1 was released in Region 2 in a digitally restored version on 28 December 2015.

== Series overview ==
Season	Episodes	Originally released	
Season	Episodes	First released	Last released
1	22	September 25, 1999	May 27, 2000
2	22	September 18, 2000	May 21, 2001
3	22	September 17, 2001	May 20, 2002

== Episodes ==
=== Season 1 (1999–2000) ===
No. overall	No. in season	Title	Directed by	Written by	Original release date	Prod. code
1	1	"Buddha's Bowl"	Ian Toynton	Bill Taub	September 25, 1999	101
Unorthodox archaeologist Sydney Fox and her new British assistant Nigel Bailey are commissioned by villagers from Nepal to find Buddha's bowl for their shrine to Siddhartha, the original Buddha. But Sydney learns her rival Stewie Harper has been hired by banker Michael Chan to find the bowl so he can save his family's bank from financial ruin.
2	2	"Smoking Gun"	Ian Toynton	Frank Encarnacao	October 2, 1999	103
Sydney and Nigel are persuaded to locate Al Capone's diamond-encrusted gun by the grandson of a man framed for murder 70 years ago, which he hopes will clear his grandfather's name. Sydney uncovers Capone's fabled booby-trapped bunker while Nigel falls in love with Lori.
3	3	"The Headless Nun"	Ken Girotti	Robert Gilmer	October 9, 1999	102
Sydney crash lands at a convent in Nova Scotia, while returning from an expedition. The Sisters of Mercy ask for help in finding the remains of Sister Evangeline, whose body has been missing for over 400 years.
4	4	"Flag Day"	David Wu	Ian Toynton	October 16, 1999	107
Sydney and Nigel see an old photo of the Pioneer's Bear Flag of California, believed to have been destroyed during the struggle to control the state in 1846.
5	5	"Thank You Very Much"	Don McCutcheon	Jurgen Wolff	October 23, 1999	105
A musician appeals to Sydney to help him find his lost guitar given to him by Elvis Presley during his G.I. days.
6	6	"Diamond in the Rough"	Don McCutcheon	Robert Gilmer	October 30, 1999	109
Arrogant baseball star Frank Newhouse hires Sydney to find the magical glove of former baseball great Jimmy Jonesboro, stolen more than 50 years ago.
7	7	"Transformation"	Clay Borris	Bill Taub	November 6, 1999	106
A military officer persuades Sydney and Nigel to join him on an undercover mission to locate the Paracelsus scrolls, fabled to contain the formula to turn lead into gold.
8	8	"Etched in Stone"	John Bell	Bill Taub	November 13, 1999	114
Stewie Harper shows up at the university posing as a visiting professor. He's got a lead on the burial treasure of king Jan II (known as 'the Bold') but needs Sydney's expertise to find it.
9	9	"The Book of Love"	Paolo Barzman	Jurgen Wolff	November 20, 1999	111
Sydney and Nigel are persuaded by soccer player Roberto Giannini into launching a search for Casanova's Book of Love.
10	10	"The Myth of the Maze"	Graeme Lynch	Robert Gilmer	November 27, 1999	112
Stavros dangles an ancient trinket in front of both Claudia and Sydney in Athens. He claims that the marble charm is the key to the fabled Minotaur's Maze.
11	11	"Irish Crown Affair"	Paolo Barzman	Jurgen Wolff	February 5, 2000	115
Sydney's former classmate Molly fears the life of an online acquaintance is in danger and begs Sydney to help. Sean Bolger discovered an ancient scroll that could lead to the lost crown of the last King of Ireland.
12	12	"The Emperor's Bride"	Stefan Scaini	Julie Lacey	February 12, 2000	108
Sydney and Nigel investigate a Chinese antiquity that washed ashore in Alaska, more than 3000 miles from its origin being lost over 3000 years.
13	13	"Afterlife and Death"	Don McCutcheon	Rob Gilmer & Bill Taub	February 19, 2000	113
Sydney and Nigel go to Cairo to chase down the real tomb raider, when Sydney's old friend Bruce Farrow is framed for plundering the tomb of Thutmose III and pocketing the Pharaoh's diamond himself.
14	14	"Nine Lives"	Paolo Barzman	William Gough	February 26, 2000	110
Elizabeth Ruckeyser, the curator of New York's Crawford Institute, summons Sydney and Nigel to track down an ancient Egyptian relic, the sacred statue of the cat goddess Mafdet that Sydney found and returned once before. However the statue seems to carry a curse on whoever steals it.
15	15	"Affaire de Coeur"	Steve DiMarco	Robert Gilmer	March 4, 2000	104
Sydney and Nigel head to the Scottish Highlands searching the missing half of the twine-ing rings that belonged to lovers from the 15th century.
16	16	"A Vanishing Art"	Ian Toynton	Naomi Janzen	March 11, 2000	116
Magician Rex Rolands seeks out Sydney's expertise to locate a jewel-encrusted staff that belonged to the Hungarian royal family.
17	17	"A Good Year"	Paolo Barzman	Martin Brossollet	April 22, 2000	118
The discovery of a hidden scroll sparks a mission to recover the lost crown jewels of France.
18	18	"The Last Knight"	Ian Toynton	Andre Jacquemetton	April 29, 2000	120
Sydney and Nigel are off to Paris to authenticate both the find and the legend behind, after monks deliver a Knights Templar medallion to Dr. Jaebert, curator at the French Institute of Antiquities.
19	19	"Love Letter"	Jean-Pierre Prevost	Elizabeth Baxter	May 6, 2000	117
Sydney and Nigel's graduate student Nicole Chamfort is convinced that young lovers from her ancestral hometown in France, were secretly married on the eve of the French Revolution, moments before the happy groom was murdered by revolutionaries.
20	20	"Possessed"	Jean-Pierre Prevost	Robert Gilmer	May 13, 2000	121
Sydney and Nigel rush off to Brussels to search for Zeus' sacred sundial, at the request of Sydney's old friend, author Eric Dalt.
21	21	"Nothing But the Truth"	John Bell	Bill Taub	May 20, 2000	119
Sydney's former mentor, Professor Chandler, passes away before finishing recovering the Ruby Chalice of Truth, his life's work, a long-fabled relic imbued with truth-inducing powers.
22	22	"Memories of Montmartre"	Paolo Barzman	Rob Gilmer & Bill Taub	May 27, 2000	122
Sydney's grandmother Isabelle's trunk of things sparks a trip into the past for Sydney, who's been fascinated with Isabelle who once sang at Paris' Moulin Rouge.

=== Season 2 (2000–01) ===
No. overall	No. in season	Title	Directed by	Written by	Original release date	Prod. code
23	1	"The Put Back"	Ian Toynton	Jeff F. King	September 18, 2000	201
Sydney and Nigel go to Africa, after answering the call of fellow Relic Hunter Ross Crawford. They must return a treasure to its original place, instead of hunting down one.
24	2	"Dagger of Death"	Ian Toynton	Jurgen Wolff	September 25, 2000	203
After he bludgeons his assistant beyond recognition, anthropologist Fredrick Terrace is convinced that the dagger of Kali, the Indian goddess of destruction, made him do it.
25	3	"Last of the Mochicas"	John Bell	Ron Levinson	October 2, 2000	204
After recovering a vessel believed to contain the Great Warrior Spirit of the Mochicas and hopping a flight to Lima, Sydney and Nigel assume their adventure is complete.
26	4	"The Legend of the Lost"	John Bell	Leonard Dick	October 9, 2000	202
Government agent Derek Lloyd, who tricked Sydney and Nigel into a mission once before, lures Sydney to New Guinea by kidnapping Nigel.
27	5	"Fertile Ground"	Terry Ingram	Michelle Lovretta	October 16, 2000	205
At a reunion, Sydney is surprised that her high school sweetheart Tony has more on his mind than before. He's on the trail of Hawaii's Idol of Lono, stolen by Captain Cook's men in 1779.
28	6	"Gypsy Jigsaw"	Larry McLean	Becky Southwell	October 23, 2000	206
Sydney receives a mysterious package after her old friend, Garrett Burke, is killed in Bucharest, sent before his death. Burke was hunting an ancient gypsy treasure, the Crown of Roma.
29	7	"Three Rivers to Cross"	Terry Ingram	Jeff F. King	October 30, 2000	207
Randal Fox, Sydney's father and a hydrodam-building engineer, beckons his daughter to China so that he can keep his word to monks who refuse to abandon Three Rivers for the dam's opening, believing their long-lost statue, the Jade Empress, is hidden in the valley.
30	8	"Roman Holiday"	Milan Cheylov	Jurgen Wolff	November 6, 2000	210
Sydney's colleague Professor Penrose has a lead on Caesar's breastplate, believed to render the wearer invincible, and heads for Rome to have the ancient text translated. With Sydney and Nigel out of town, Claudia was going to give Penrose some additional documents, but she becomes suspicious when she sees the papers with someone else, and follows that guy to Rome.
31	9	"Cross of Voodoo"	George Mendeluk	Charles Heit	November 13, 2000	209
Two of Sydney's graduate students on the trail of the Haitian Cross of Utu disappear in the New Orleans area. Sydney and Nigel go down on the bayou, but encounter the two as possessed by voodoo.
32	10	"Lost Contact"	Milan Cheylov	Leonard Dick	November 20, 2000	208
To rescue a relic-hunting team hired by billionaire entrepreneur Rod Thorson to locate an ancient sacrificial bowl, Sydney, Nigel and Thorson parachute into the Myanmar jungle.
33	11	"The Reel Thing"	John Bell	Martin Brossollet	January 8, 2001	211
While serving as technical advisors for a movie shoot, Sydney and Nigel discover that two of the props used were actual relics of Egyptian Pharaoh Amun the Second, whose treasure-laden burial chamber was thought to have never been found.
34	12	"M.I.A."	Julian Grant	Gil Grant	January 15, 2001	215
While working on a sting operation orchestrated by Interpol agent Cate Hemphill (from the episode "Last of the Mochicas"), Sydney is abducted by an unseen assailant. Cate, Nigel and Claudia come up with a list of possible rivals and enemies, and recount their past adventures.
35	13	"Out of the Past"	Paolo Barzman	Edwina Follows	January 29, 2001	212
Sydney and Nigel laugh it off when Claudia claims to have known Cleopatra personally, but then Claudia's vision of the Egyptian queen's golden jewelry box holding a secret compartment comes true. Claudia joins Sydney in Egypt where she undergoes past life regression therapy in order to find Cleopatra's necklace before an enemy who kills with live scorpions does. Meanwhile, Nigel stays at the college to deal with an audit of their department's expenses conducted by an intimidating accountant.
36	14	"Eyes of Toklamanee"	John Bell	Larry Mollin	February 5, 2001	213
Sydney's graduate student Adam has a lead on finding the legendary Eyes of Toklamanee. However, the site is under construction for a subway extension, and it is also unusually heavily guarded. Sydney must convince the supervising archaeologist to help them out.
37	15	"Run Sydney Run"	Paolo Barzman	Jeff F. King	February 12, 2001	214
Sydney, Nigel and their Army escorts are ambushed by rebel forces, while in Russia recovering an ancient blade, known as the Sword of Ateas, lost over 2000 years ago. Sydney is shot and passes out, but when she wakes up, she finds herself in a locked house where the owner states that her assistant was killed, and that he wants to challenge her to a The Most Dangerous Game-like hunt.
38	16	"French Connection"	Paolo Barzman	Peter Mohan	February 19, 2001	217
Sydney and Nigel are asked by a MI5 agent to search for a medallion reputed to help decode a prophecy riddle from Nostradamus that a Fox will stop an assassination attempt. However, not everything is as it seems since another rival relic hunter was hired, and the government seems more interested in stopping Fox as the assassin.
39	17	"Don't Go into the Woods"	Ian Toynton	Elizabeth Baxter	April 16, 2001	216
Author and conspiracy theorist Vladimir Bugos contacts Sydney and Nigel to locate the Golden Falcon of Maribor, a relic last seen the night Crown Princess Natasha, its owner, disappeared about 400 years ago. However, by the time the two arrive in a remote village, Bugos is nowhere to be seen, and the townsfolk are especially distrusting of the visitors. They warn them not to go out at night because of the wolves and possibly werewolves.
40	18	"Midnight Flight"	Ian Toynton	Charles Heit	April 23, 2001	218
Sydney's old friend Frederick from the Louvre Museum begs to join the hunt for a ruby-encrusted scepter once wielded by Gunther the Brave. However, things get complicated when his supervisor Francois reveals that Frederick actually stole it for himself and sold it to a Turkish diplomat who is leaving the country at midnight.
41	19	"The Executioner's Mask"	Paolo Barzman	Maria & Andre Jacquemetton	April 30, 2001	219
A bronze mask previously worn by an executioner during the French Revolution disfigures Sydney's fashion model friend. Sydney and Nigel figure out how to remove its curse.
42	20	"The Royal Ring"	John Bell	Jurgen Wolff	May 7, 2001	220
Nigel's older brother Preston, who is a curator at the British Museum, uncovers a riddle by Henry VIII that may lead to the wedding ring of Anne Boleyn. Nigel's childhood crush also appears, and other relic hunters are on the move as they visit Leeds Castle.
43	21	"Set in Stone"	Paolo Barzman	David Wolkove	May 14, 2001	221
Sydney and Nigel visit a remote monastery in Hungary in order to see whether Nigel's childhood tale of St. Gabriel and a magic sword set in a stone is true. However, the abbot denies that Nigel's correspondent existed, and sends them away. They soon get a lead on where to find St. Gabriel's gauntlet, a relic that would let the wielder pull out the sword.
44	22	"Deadline"	John Bell	Jeff F. King	May 21, 2001	222
One of Sydney's friends has been infected with a deadly virus, and has 12 hours to find and deliver to a collector the world's first Christian Tau cross, which is believed to raise the dead so they can go to heaven.

=== Season 3 (2001–02) ===
No. overall	No. in season	Title	Directed by	Written by	Original release date	Prod. code
45	1	"Wages of Sydney"	John Bell	Jeff F. King	September 17, 2001	301
Sydney and Nigel are hot on the trail of a Chinese ‘dragon's egg’ which is rumoured to contain an early Nitroglycerin-like explosive.
46	2	"Mr. Right"	John Bell	Kris Dobkin	September 24, 2001	303
After recovering an artifact in Bali, Sydney runs into her ex, Gray, and decides to remain there on vacation while Nigel heads back to the States. But, when intrepid CIA agent Derek Lloyd shows up to enlist her to find Parvati's Bowl, she can't resist.
47	3	"Sydney at Ten"	Ian Toynton	Leonard Dick	October 1, 2001	304
As a boarding school student 20 years ago, Sydney witnessed the fatal robbery of her professor. Now she must help her former classmate recover the Egyptian pharaoh's necklace that was stolen.
48	4	"The Light of Truth"	George Mendeluk	Andre & Maria Jacquemetton	October 8, 2001	305
Prince Shareem withdraws from Sydney's class in order to prepare to take over his father's kingdom. But because he doesn't know which advisors he could trust, he asks Sydney for help to find the Light of Truth, a lamp relic that would reveal the true nature of anyone who holds it. When Sydney declines, Shareem disappears, and resorts to hiring a rival archaeologist Frank Kafka, who in the last conflict with Sydney, lost his left hand. Shareem's uncle asks Sydney to look for Shareem. Meanwhile, Karen helps secure a new apartment for Nigel.
49	5	"Treasure Island"	John Bell	Jurgen Wolff	October 15, 2001	306
The wife of a recently deceased criminal relic hunter asks Sydney for her help to recover the real-life treasure that author Robert Louis Stevenson wrote about in Treasure Island.
50	6	"Star of Nadir"	Terry Ingram	Alison Lea Bingeman	October 22, 2001	308
Sydney and Nigel travel to the Middle East to meet an old friend of Sydney's, who is now a queen, only to discover that she has died in a mysterious accident. The queen was looking for the Star of Nadir, which is a token of true leadership. Sydney and Nigel simultaneously pursue the Star and the queen’s killer.
51	7	"Vampire's Kiss"	Ian Toynton	Michelle Lovretta	October 29, 2001	302
Horror writer Lucas Blackmer asks Sydney for help in finding the Vampiric chalice, which is purported to help keep a vampire alive. Karen and Nigel, however, uncover evidence to suggest that Blackmer is a vampire himself, and may be plotting a series of underhand schemes. When a vampire hunter named Kantor intervenes, Sydney must choose whom to believe.
52	8	"Devil Doll"	Bruce Pittman	Charles Heit	November 5, 2001	309
Sydney and Nigel recover a ruby-eyed statue from an Aztec pyramid in Central America, only to be tied up and robbed by their tour guide, Carlos. Upon freeing themselves, the duo chases Carlos, only to find him dead and the statue gone.
53	9	"Incognito"	Terry Ingram	Jurgen Wolff	November 12, 2001	310
While recovering a 16th-century lancet from a New Guinea cave, Nigel accidentally cuts himself with it, and ends up acquiring the strength of many warriors. Cate from Interpol recruits him to pretend to be Ian Worthingham, a criminal relic hunter who strongly resembles him.
54	10	"All Choked Up"	Holly Dale	James Thorpe	November 19, 2001	311
Sydney is grabbed by mysterious men who lock a necklace on her. The necklace in question has mind controlling powers and influences Sydney to take a leave of absence and travel to a Greek island with an active volcano where she is to help an artifact-collecting woman locate a statue of Athena. Nigel must break Sydney’s spell before she comes after him, with murder in mind.
55	11	"Warlock of Nu Theta Phi"	Bruce Pittman	Tracey Forbes	January 14, 2002	312
Meg, a top student of Sydney’s, receives an amulet from her roommate, but when she inadvertently recites the amulet’s attached inscription, she falls into a coma and is also possessed by a spirit. Sydney and Nigel consult a local occultist who confirms the amulet is connected to a group of Wiccans who were persecuted in the Salem Witch Trials. Meg's boyfriend, who is in a fraternity, tells his roommate about the situation, but his roommate takes advantage of the situation to steal the amulet in order to gain its powers.
56	12	"Women Want to Know"	George Mendeluk	Charles Heit	January 21, 2002	307
While filming a television documentary in Southeast Asia, Sydney, the host, and her cameraman, are stuck in a temple cave as they try to hide from a rebel militia group. Meanwhile, Nigel and Karen work with the TV producer to make some B-roll footage, but when they learn Sydney and the crew are stuck, they must convince the area consulate to get a rescue team to them.
57	13	"Fire in the Sky"	Jorge Montesi	David Wolkove	January 28, 2002	313
Businessman Bobby Green presents Sydney with a wood fragment carved with a mysterious symbol that is associated with his Mondagan Indigenous tribe in the Pacific Northwest. Sydney reasons that since the Mondagans saw a meteor crash land that caused their tribe to change their practices, that is, cargo culture, there may be more relics to uncover. Meanwhile, a government agency is intent on tracking and stopping Green from exposing the secrets, and the tribe's sheriff also doesn't want them looking around.
58	14	"Hunting with the Enemy"	Terry Ingram	Kris Dobkin	February 4, 2002	314
Sydney and Nigel are captured and taken to Fabrice De Viega, an old nemesis, who requires their help in recovering an urn containing the ashes of Confucius. They have to traverse a part of the Cambodian jungle that is full of land mines and must retrieve the relic before the government blows up the area. De Viega also sends someone to capture Karen.
59	15	"Antianeirai"	Jeff F. King	Jeff F. King	February 11, 2002	316
When her mentor and former department chair goes missing, Sydney heads off with Nigel to Istanbul to investigate. They learn that her mentor was killed and that a piece of an ancient staff he had taken by a gang of militant Amazons called the Antianeirai. Nigel tries to infiltrate the group by acting as the translator contact, but is abducted and taken to a place that has a tomb that contains the Belt of Hippolyte (from the Labours of Hercules). Meanwhile, Karen has to deal with a safety inspection of their department's relic storage room.
60	16	"Under the Ice"	Jorge Montesi	Damian Kindler	February 18, 2002	315
Sydney and Nigel visit a remote research base in the Arctic Circle (Note: For the "Under the Ice" episode, some of the published summaries state the base was in the Antarctic), to examine a Anasazi native that was mummified and encased in ice. However, they discover the scientists have all died except for a woman and a missing man. With the mummy thawed out, they suspect there might have been a curse unleashed.
61	17	"Arthur's Cross"	Paolo Barzman	Rio Fanning	April 15, 2002	321
Nigel and Sydney investigate the case of a man who was killed by a blow to the head by a suspected relic weapon. The marks appear to be writing that is associated with the legendary Cross of Arthur. Suspicious of everyone affiliated with the deceased, Sydney unravels a series of cryptic clues to discover who’s responsible and to recover the valuable relic. Meanwhile, Karen must stall a school patron looking for Sydney.
62	18	"Faux Fox"	Jonathan Hackett	Peter Hume	April 22, 2002	317
While Nigel is romanced by a beautiful student, Sydney is clocked from behind by a thief who steals her wallet and crossbow. The student and thief impersonate Sydney and Nigel as they meet up with a professor in Spain. When the real Sydney and Nigel arrive, they find the professor was murdered with Sydney's crossbow, so they have to evade authorities while going after the killers in search of the Spanish Crown Jewels.
63	19	"Pandora's Box"	Mark Roper	Arnie Olsen	April 29, 2002	318
Sydney inherits the key to Pandora's box and begins the hunt for the infamous relic. They are befriended by a local who helps them access the palace grounds while dressed as harem dancers. However, other looters plan to misuse the box for their own gain.
64	20	"The Warlord"	Chris Bould	Edwina Follows	May 6, 2002	319
While uncovering an ancient wall painting in Bekkastan, Sydney and Nigel discover a thief is stealing their horses. While Sydney pursues the thief, Nigel is left behind and collapses. Nigel is rescued and revived by a beautiful woman named Haya while Sydney has to deal with the horse thief Tobar. Both people are looking for the legendary saddle of Kahina so they can establish the right to rule their people.
65	21	"Fountain of Youth"	Chris Bould	Jurgen Wolff	May 13, 2002	320
In Seville, a woman looking for "Bailey" presses Nigel for a letter from the Duke, but Sydney stops her and she escapes. Nigel's brother Preston soon appears, and they visit a manor where they hope to find the vials containing liquid collected from the Fountain of Youth. But they have to deal with that woman as well as a rival relic hunter.
66	22	"So Shall It Be"	Jonathan Hackett	Jeff F. King	May 20, 2002	322
Plagued by dreams of her dead arch nemesis Fabrice De Viega, Sydney must regain her senses as she searches for the ‘astronomicons’, the lost keys to the druid cult in Stonehenge. Aided by a young druid author who is not who he seems, Sydney and Nigel must unravel a mystery that will shock them to their very core.
