= 14th Gemini Awards =

1999 awards for Canadian television

- Date: November 7, 1999
- Venue: Metro Toronto Convention Centre
- Hosted by: Rick Mercer

Television/radio coverage
- Network: CBC Television

The Academy of Canadian Cinema & Television's 14th Gemini Awards were held on November 7, 1999, to honour achievements in Canadian television. The awards show, which was hosted by Rick Mercer, took place at the Metro Toronto Convention Centre and was broadcast on CBC Television.

== Best Dramatic Series ==
- Da Vinci's Inquest – Haddock Entertainment, Barna-Alper Productions, Alliance Atlantis Productions, Canadian Broadcasting Corporation. Producers: Chris Haddock, Laszlo Barna
- More Tales of the City – Working Title Films. Producers: Kevin Tierney, Suzanne Girard, Alan Poul, Tim Bevan
- Foolish Heart – Canadian Broadcasting Corporation. Producers: Ken Finkleman, Brian Dennis
- La Femme Nikita – Baton Broadcasting, Fireworks Entertainment. Producers: Jamie Paul Rock, Jay Firestone
- Traders – Atlantis Films. Producers: Seaton McLean, Sandie Pereira, Peter Mitchell

== Best TV Movie or Miniseries ==
- Milgaard – Barna-Alper Productions, Bar Harbour Films, Marble Island Pictures. Producers: Vibika Bianchi, Laszlo Barna, Richard Findlay, Martin Harbury, Laura Lightbown
- At the End of the Day: The Sue Rodriguez Story – Barna-Alper Productions, Atlantic Mediaworks. Producers: Laszlo Barna, Bob Miller, Sheldon Larry
- Happy Christmas, Miss King – Sullivan Entertainment. Producers: Kevin Sullivan, Trudy Grant
- Justice – Alliance Atlantis Productions. Producers: Alyson Feltes, Brian Dennis, Seaton McLean
- Shot Through the Heart – Alliance Atlantis, BBC, Company Pictures, LeFrak Productions, Transatlantic Media Associates. Producers: Robert Lantos, Su Armstrong, Francine Lefrak, David M. Thompson

== Best Comedy Program or Series ==
- Made in Canada – Salter Street Films, Island Edge. Producers: Marilyn Richardson, Gerald Lunz, Linda Nelson, Michael Donovan
- Double Exposure – CBC Radio One. Producers: Bob Robertson, Linda Cullen, Nick Orchard
- Comedy Now! – Elvira Kurt: Big Girl Now – CTV. Producers Trisa Dayot, Sandra Faire
- Air Farce Live – Canadian Broadcasting Corporation. Producers: Roger Abbott, Don Ferguson
- The Red Green Show – Red Green Productions. Producer: Steve Smith

== Best Music, Variety Program or Series ==
- This Hour Has 22 Minutes New Year's Eve Special – Salter Street Films, Canadian Broadcasting Corporation. Producers: Michael Donovan, Geoff D'Eon, Andrew McInnes, Jack Kellum, Paul Bellini
- 1998 True North Concert – Producers: Keith MacNeill, Steve Glassman, Jack Bond
- History Bites – The History Channel. Producer: Rick Green
- In Thru the Out Door – Canadian Broadcasting Corporation. Producer: Andy Nulman
- Juno Awards of 1999 – Canadian Academy of Recording Arts and Sciences. Producers: Stephen Stohn, Lynn Harvey
- West Coast Music Awards – Producer: Moyra Rodger

== Best Performing Arts Program or Series, or Arts Documentary Program or Series ==
- The Genius of Lenny Breau – Sleeping Giant Productions, Buffalo Gal Pictures. Producers: Jim Hanley, Phyllis Laing, Paul McConvey

== Donald Brittain Award for Best Documentary Program ==
- Crimes of Honor – Canadian Broadcasting Corporation, Bishari Films. Producer: Shelley Saywell
- Believing – Producer: Nicole Lamothe
- East Side Showdown – National Film Board of Canada. Producer: Peter Starr
- Four Women of Egypt – National Film Board of Canada. Producer: Éric Michel
- The Dragon's Egg – TVOntario. Producers: Elizabeth Yake, Allan King, Rudy Buttignol

== Best Documentary Series ==
- The View from Here – TVOntario. Producer: Rudy Buttignol
- Man Alive – Canadian Broadcasting Corporation. Producers: Robin Christmas, Joy Crysdale
- Rough Cuts – CBC Newsworld. Producers: Catherine Olsen, Tassie Notar, Jerry McIntosh
- The Cola Conquest – DLI Productions. Producers: Jan Rofekamp, Amy Webb, Abbey Jack Neidik, Irene Angelico
- Witness – Canadian Broadcasting Corporation. Producers: Janice Tufford, Marie Natanson, Hilary Armstrong

== Best History, Biography Documentary Program ==
- Hitman Hart: Wrestling with Shadows – National Film Board of Canada, High Road Productions. Producers: Sally Blake, Paul Jay, Louise Lore, David M. Ostriker, Silva Basmajian, Rudy Buttignol
- Deadly Seas – Canadian Broadcasting Corporation. Producers: Mala Chapple, Michael Maclear
- Gabrielle Roy – Buffalo Gal Pictures. Producers: Ian Boyd, Phyllis Laing
- John McCrae's War: In Flanders Fields – National Film Board of Canada. Producers: Jonathan Desbarats, Barbara Shearer, Selwyn Jacob

== Best Science, Technology, Nature, Environment or Adventure Documentary Program ==
- My Healing Journey: Seven Years with Cancer – National Film Board of Canada. Producer: Jerry Krepakevich
- Baboon Tales – Tamarin Productions. Producers: Gillian Darling-Kovanic, Rudolf Kovanic
- The Nature of Things – Up Close and Personal – Canadian Broadcasting Corporation. Producer: Caroline Underwood
- The Nature of Things – The Pill – Canadian Broadcasting Corporation. Producer: Joseph MacDonald
- Walking with Giants: The Grizzlies of Siberia – Rubin Tarrant Productions. Producer: Ian Herring

== Best News Information Series ==
- the fifth estate – Canadian Broadcasting Corporation. Producers: David Studer, Susan Teskey
- The Health Show – Canadian Broadcasting Corporation. Producer: Sophia Hadzipetros
- The Magazine – CBC Newsworld. Producers: Janet Thomson, Kelly Crichton, Bob Bishop
- W5 – CTV. Producers: Anton Koschany, Ian McLeod

== Best Newscast/News Special ==
- The National/CBC News – Swissair Disaster. Producers: Kelly Crichton, Hedy Korbee, Fred Parker (CBC)
- CTV National News – Crisis in Kosovo. Producer: Henry Kowalski (CTV)
- CTV National News – Shooting at Columbine High. Producer: Henry Kowalski, Robert Hurst (CTV)
- CTV National News – Swissair Flight 111. Producer: Henry Kowalski (CTV)
- 'The National/CBC News – Town Hall: Canada At War. Producers: Fred Parker, Mark Bulgutch, Chris Waddell (CBC)

== Best Talk, Information Program or Series ==
- Open Mike with Mike Bullard – The Comedy Network. Producers: Barbara Bowlby, Al Magee, John Brunton
- Canada AM – CTV Television Network. Producers: Michael Serapio, Zev Shalev, Sean O'Malley
- Gzowski in Conversation – Canadian Broadcasting Corporation. Producers: Mary Young Leckie, Heather Haldane, Joan Tosoni
- Hot Type – CBC Newsworld. Producers: Maria Mironowicz, Andrew Johnson
- Imprint – TVOntario. Producers: Linda Dunlop, Richard Ouzounian

== Best Lifestyle Information Series ==
- Weird Homes – Life Network, Homes II Productions, Yaletown Entertainment. Producer: Mike Collier
- Country Canada – Canadian Broadcasting Corporation. Producer: Nigel Simms
- Fashion File – CBC Newsworld, Toronto Life Fashion Magazine. Producers: Debbie Gibson, Maria Mironowicz, Réjean Beaudin
- Pet Project – Life Network. Producers: Dale Burshtein, Lon J. Hall
- Real Families – Life Network. Producers: Shoshana de Paz, Mark Ross
- Spilled Milk – Canadian Broadcasting Corporation. Producer: Melanie Wood

== Best Animated Program or Series or Short Animated Program ==
- Rolie Polie Olie – Nelvana, Métal Hurlant Productions. Producers: Michael Hirsh, Fabrice Giger, William Joyce, Patrick Loubert, Clive A. Smith
- The Eye of the Wolf – CinéGroupe. Producer: Jacques Pettigrew
- Snow Cat – National Film Board of Canada. Producers: Sheldon Cohen, Kenneth Hirsch, Marcy Page
- Tongue Twister – Collideascope. Producers: Sean Scott, Steven J.P. Comeau, Michael-Andreas Kuttner
- Twisteeria – Scintilla Entertainment. Producers: Pindar Azad, James C. McPhalen

== Best Preschool Program or Series ==
- Sesame Park – Canadian Broadcasting Corporation. Producers: Duncan Lamb, Susan Sheehan, Wendy Smith
- Panda Bear Daycare – YTV, Radical Sheep Productions. Producers: John Leitch, Cheryl Wagner, Rob Mills
- Ruffus the Dog – YTV, Radical Sheep Productions. Producers: John Leitch, Cheryl Wagner, Rob Mills

== Best Children's or Youth Program or Series ==
- The Inventors' Specials – The Inventors' Specials: Edison: The Wizard of Light – Devine Entertainment. Producers: David Devine, Richard Mozer
- Jenny and the Queen of Light – Breakthrough Entertainment. Producers: Andrea Boyd, Lawrence Zack, Peter Williamson, Ira Levy
- Yaa! To the M@X – YTV. Producers: Jonathan Finkelstein, Michel C. Lavoie, André Picard
- Goosebumps – Protocol Entertainment. Producers: Steven Levitan, Deborah Forte, Bill Siegler
- Incredible Story Studios – Mind's Eye Entertainment. Producers: Rob W. King, Virginia Thompson, Kevin DeWalt, Robert de Lint

== Best Sports Program or Series ==
- The New Ice Age: A Year in the Life of the NHL – Canadian Broadcasting Corporation, White Pine Pictures. Producers: Peter Raymont, Joseph Blasioli, Maria Pimentel
- Dave Hodge Special: The Three Nicest People in Sports – CBC Sports. Producer: Mitch Kerzner
- Hockey Night in Canada – Maple Leaf Gardens: A Hockey Night in Canada Farewell – CBC Sports. Producers: Joel Darling, Paul Harrington
- Olympic Warrior: Donovan Bailey's Story – CBC Sports. Producer: John Curtin
- Sports Journal – CBC Sports. Producers: Brenda Irving, Claude Panet-Raymond, Tom Harrington, Ken Dodd

== Best Short Drama ==
- The Dane — Christina Ford, Jeffrey Berman, David Huband
- December 1917 — Craig Cameron, Evangelo Kioussis, Scott Simpson
- The Tale of Teeka — Anna Stratton, Arnie Gelbart

== Best Live Sporting Event ==
- 1998 Commonwealth Games – CBC Sports. Producers: Doug Sellars, Terry Ludwick
- 1998 Export A Skins Golf – CBC Sports. Producers: Joel Darling, Jim Marshall
- TSN World World Junior Hockey Final from Winnipeg – TSN. Producer: Rick Briggs-Jude

== Best Live Special Event Coverage ==
- CBC Newsworld – Crash of Swissair 111 – CBC Newsworld. Producers: Mark Bulgutch, Brian Dubreuil, Dan Leger
- CBC Newsworld – Mandela and the Children – CBC Newsworld. Producers: Fred Parker, Mark Bulgutch, Chris Waddell
- CTV News 1: Tragedy in Taber – CTV News Channel. Producer: Tom Haberstroh
- CTV News Special Report: 1998 SCOC Ruling on Quebec Succession – CTV News. Producer: Tom Haberstroh, Robert Hurst
- @discovery.ca – John Glenn: Mission of Discovery: Live Special – Discovery Channel. Producers: Alex Bystram, Paul Lewis, Deanna Kraus

== Best Direction in a Dramatic Program or Mini-Series ==
- Stephen Williams – Milgaard (Barna-Alper Productions/Bar Harbour Films/Marble Island Pictures)
- Gil Cardinal – Big Bear (Telefilm Canada/Productions Télé-Action/Kanata Productions)
- Stefan Scaini – Happy Christmas, Miss King (Sullivan Entertainment)
- Raymond Saint-Jean – Out of Mind: The Stories of H. P. Lovecraft (Cine Qua Non Films)
- Tim Southam – The Tale of Teeka (Galafilm/Triptych Media)

== Best Direction in a Dramatic Series ==
- Ken Finkleman – Foolish Heart: "Breathless" (CBC)
- George Bloomfield – Due South: "Dead Guy Running" (Alliance Films)
- Chris Bould – Emily of New Moon: "Pins and Needles, Needles and Pins, When a Man Gets Married, His Trouble Begins" (Salter Street Films/Cinar)
- John Fawcett – Power Play (CTV Originals/NDG Productions/Serendipity Point Films/Alliance Atlantis)
- T. W. Peacocke – Traders (Atlantis Films)

== Best Direction in a Variety, or Performing Arts Program or Series ==
- Henry Sarwer-Foner – This Hour Has 22 Minutes New Year's Eve Special (Salter Street Films/CBC)
- Judy Jackson, Serge Turbide – Beauty for Ashes: Artists and Human Rights
- Laura Taler, Moze Mossanen – Dances for a Small Screen (Taler Group/Triptych Media, Hammond Associates)
- Michael McNamara – In Thru the Out Door (Showtime)
- Robert Crossman – Water, Earth, Air, Fire (BravoFACT/Paulus Productions)

== Best Direction in an Information Program or Series ==
- Neil Docherty – the fifth estate – Bad Blood (CBC)
- David Storey – Pet Project (Life Network)
- Ramelle Mair, Serge Marcil, Sid Goldberg, Jean Louis Côté – Popular Mechanics For Kids (SDA Productions)
- Michael Prini – Savoir Faire (Primevista Television)
- Linda McEwan – The Health Show (CBC)

== Best Direction in a Documentary Program or Series ==
- Joseph Viszmeg – My Healing Journey: Seven Years with Cancer (NFB)
- Patricio Guzmán – Chile, Obstinate Memory (NFB)
- Barry Greenwald – High Risk Offender (NFB)
- Paul Jay – Hitman Hart: Wrestling with Shadows (National Film Board of Canada/High Road Productions)
- Jane Armstrong – Nuclear Sharks (Discovery Channel)
- Maurice Bulbulian – The Nitinaht Chronicles (NFB)

== Best Direction in a Comedy Program or Series ==
- Henry Sarwer-Foner – Made in Canada – And the Winner is... (Salter Street Films, Island Edge)
- Giles Walker – Dooley Gardens (CBC)
- Ray Hagel – The Tom Green Show (The Comedy Network)
- Henry Sarwer-Foner – This Hour Has 22 Minutes (Salter Street Films/CBC)
- Andrew Currie – Twisteeria (Scintilla Entertainment)

== Best Writing in a Dramatic Program or Miniseries ==
- Gordon Pinsent – Win, Again! (CBC)
- Linda Svendsen – At the End of the Day: The Sue Rodriguez Story (Barna-Alper Productions, Atlantic Mediaworks)
- Andrew Wreggitt – In the Blue Ground (Alberta Filmworks)
- Alan Di Fiore, Keith Ross Leckie – Milgaard (Barna-Alper Productions/Bar Harbour Films/Marble Island Pictures)
- Moze Mossanen – My Gentleman Friends (Bravo!)

== Best Writing in a Dramatic Series ==
- Chris Haddock, Leonel Luna – Da Vinci's Inquest – The Quality of Mercy (Haddock Entertainment/Barna-Alper Productions/Alliance Atlantis Productions/CBC)
- Chris Haddock, Larry Campbell, Esta Spalding – Da Vinci's Inquest (Haddock Entertainment/Barna-Alper Productions/Alliance Atlantis Productions/Canadian Broadcasting Corporation)
- Ken Finkleman – Foolish Heart – The Correct Decision (CBC)
- Paul Aitken, Peter Mitchell – Traders (Atlantis Films)

== Best Writing in a Comedy or Variety Program or Series ==
- Cathy Jones, Mark Farrell, Ron James, Chris Finn, Edward Kay, Rick Mercer, Tim Steeves, Greg Thomey, Mary Walsh – This Hour Has 22 Minutes New Year's Eve Special (Salter Street Films/CBC)
- David Fine – Bob and Margaret (Nelvana)
- Rick Mercer, Mark Farrell – Made in Canada (Salter Street Films/Island Edge)
- Gord Oxley, Paul O'Sullivan, Jonathan Crombie, Lisa Lambert, Bob Martin – SketchCom (CBC)
- Bruce Pirrie, Bob Bainborough, Steve Smith, Rick Green, Shaun Graham – The Red Green Show (Red Green Productions)

== Best Writing in an Information Program or Series ==
- Clifton Joseph – Undercurrents – Snow Job (CBC)
- Joe Schlesinger – Schlesinger (CBC)
- Brenda Irving – Sports Journal (CBC Sports)
- Francine Pelletier – the fifth estate (CBC)
- Brian Stewart – The Magazine (CBC Newsworld)
- Catherine Legge – Undercurrents (CBC)

== Best Writing in a Documentary Program or Series ==
- Paul Cowan, Irene Angelico, Howard Goldberg – The Cola Conquest – The Big Sell (DLI Productions)
- Chris Mullington – Man Alive – Beyond Belief (CBC)
- Monty Bassett – Life on the Vertical (Out Yonder Films)
- Joseph Viszmeg – My Healing Journey: Seven Years with Cancer (NFB)
- Nadine Pequeneza – Turning Points of History (The History Channel)
- Alan Mendelsohn – Turning Points of History (The History Channel)

== Best Writing in a Children's or Youth Program ==
- Peter Sauder, Ian James Corlett – Rolie Polie Olie – Roll the Camera (Nelvana/Métal Hurlant Productions)
- Dennis Foon – Jenny and the Queen of Light (Breakthrough Entertainment)
- John Pellatt, Kenn Scott – Ned's Newt – Back To the Futile (Nelvana/TMO Film GmbH)
- Vicki Grant – Scoop and Doozie (Queen Bee Productions)
- Louise Moon – Street Cents (CBC)

== Best Performance by an Actor in a Leading Role in a Dramatic Program or Miniseries ==
- Ian Tracey – Milgaard (Barna-Alper Productions/Bar Harbour Films/Marble Island Pictures)
- Stephen McHattie – American Whiskey Bar (Citytv/Shadow Shows)
- Henry Czerny – The Girl Next Door (FTM Productions/Shostak-Rossner Productions/World International Network)
- Peter Kelly Gaudreault – In the Blue Ground (Alberta Filmworks)
- Gordon Pinsent – Win, Again! (CBC)

== Best Performance by an Actress in a Leading Role in a Dramatic Program or Miniseries ==
- Wendy Crewson – At the End of the Day: The Sue Rodriguez Story (Barna-Alper Productions/Atlantic Mediaworks)
- Polly Shannon – The Girl Next Door (FTM Productions/Shostak-Rossner Productions/World International Network)
- Julie Khaner – Justice (Alliance Atlantis Productions)
- Gabrielle Rose – Milgaard (Barna-Alper Productions/Bar Harbour Films/Marble Island Pictures)
- Gabrielle Rose – Win, Again! (CBC)

== Best Performance by an Actor in a Continuing Leading Dramatic Role ==
- Michael Riley – Power Play – Seventh Game (CTV Originals/NDG Productions/Serendipity Point Films/Alliance Atlantis)
- Donnelly Rhodes – Da Vinci's Inquest (Haddock Entertainment/Barna-Alper Productions/Alliance Atlantis Productions/Canadian Broadcasting Corporation
- Paul Gross – Due South (Alliance Films)
- Callum Keith Rennie – Due South – Ladies Man (Alliance Films)
- John Neville – Emily of New Moon (Salter Street Films/Cinar)
- Michael Easton – Total Recall 2070 (ONtv/Alliance Atlantis)

== Best Performance by an Actress in a Continuing Leading Dramatic Role ==
- Arsinée Khanjian – Foolish Heart – Lena (CBC)
- Rebecca Jenkins – Black Harbour (Fogbound Films/Topsail Entertainment)
- Sheila McCarthy – Emily of New Moon (Salter Street Films/Cinar)
- Peta Wilson – La Femme Nikita (Baton Broadcasting/Fireworks Entertainment)
- Sonja Smits – Traders (Atlantis Films)
- Kathy Greenwood – Wind at My Back – Marathon (CBC)

== Best Performance by an Actor in a Guest Role Dramatic Series ==
- Sean McCann – Power Play – Perambulate Me Back To My Habitual Abode (CTV Originals/NDG Productions/Serendipity Point Films/Alliance Atlantis)
- Morris Panych – Cold Squad – Season II (Keatley MacLeod Productions/Atlantis Films)
- Timothy Webber – Cold Squad – Season II (Keatley MacLeod Productions/Atlantis Films)
- Jan Rubeš – The City (Sarrazin Couture Entertainment)
- Gordon Pinsent – Wind at My Back – Season II (CBC)

== Best Performance by an Actress in a Guest Role Dramatic Series ==
- Martha Henry – Emily of New Moon – The Book Of Hours (Salter Street Films/Cinar)
- Gabrielle Miller – Da Vinci's Inquest (Haddock Entertainment/Barna-Alper Productions/Alliance Atlantis Productions/Canadian Broadcasting Corporation
- Salome Bey – Due South (Alliance Films)
- Sarah Strange – Nothing Too Good for a Cowboy (Alliance Communications, Milestone Productions)
- Enuka Okuma – Traders (Atlantis Films)

== Best Performance by an Actor in a Featured Supporting Role in a Dramatic Program or Miniseries ==
- Hrothgar Mathews – Milgaard (Barna-Alper Productions/Bar Harbour Films/Marble Island Pictures)
- Jaimz Woolvett – Milgaard (Barna-Alper Productions/Bar Harbour Films/Marble Island Pictures)
- Garwin Sanford – Milgaard (Barna-Alper Productions/Bar Harbour Films/Marble Island Pictures)
- Kenneth Welsh – Scandalous Me: The Jacqueline Susann Story (Alliance Atlantis Productions)
- Michael Riley – Win, Again! (CBC)

== Best Performance by an Actress in a Featured Supporting Role in a Dramatic Program or Miniseries ==
- Sabrina Grdevich – Milgaard (Barna-Alper Productions/Bar Harbour Films/Marble Island Pictures)
- Mag Ruffman – Happy Christmas, Miss King (Sullivan Entertainment)
- Deanna Milligan – Justice (Alliance Atlantis Productions)
- Shannon Lawson – Sleeping Dogs Lie (Sullivan Entertainment)
- Leah Pinsent – Win, Again! (CBC)

== Best Performance by an Actor in a Featured Supporting Role in a Dramatic Series ==
- Gordon Pinsent – Power Play – Perambulate Me Back To My Habitual Abode (CTV Originals/NDG Productions/Serendipity Point Films/Alliance Atlantis)
- Timothy Webber – Black Harbour (Fogbound Films/Topsail Entertainment)
- Peter Blais – Psi Factor: Chronicles of the Paranormal (Atlantis Films/Alliance Atlantis)
- Shawn Doyle – The City (Sarrazin Couture Entertainment)
- Michael Sarrazin – The City (Sarrazin Couture Entertainment)

== Best Performance by an Actress in a Featured Supporting Role in a Dramatic Series ==
- Marion Gilsenan – Riverdale (Epitome Pictures)
- Jackie Burroughs – More Tales of the City – (Working Title Films)
- Ramona Milano – Due South (Alliance Films)
- Sarah Strange – Foolish Heart: "Lena" (CBC)
- Caterina Scorsone – Power Play (CTV Originals/NDG Productions/Serendipity Point Films/Alliance Atlantis)

== Best Performance in a Comedy Program or Series ==
- Cathy Jones, Rick Mercer, Greg Thomey, Mary Walsh – This Hour Has 22 Minutes – Warrior Princess/Mike Harris/Talking To Americans (Salter Street Films/CBC)
- Shaun Majumder – Comedy Now! (CTV)
- Bob Robertson, Linda Cullen – Double Exposure (CBC Radio One)
- Leah Pinsent, Peter Keleghan, Dan Lett, Rick Mercer – Made in Canada – A Death in the Family (Salter Street Films, Island Edge)
- Tom Green – The Tom Green Show (The Comedy Network)

== Best Performance or Host in a Variety Program or Series ==
- Jesse Cook, Natalie MacMaster – Juno Awards of 1999 (Canadian Academy of Recording Arts and Sciences)
- Ginette Reno – 19th Genie Awards (Academy of Canadian Cinema & Television)
- Bruno Pelletier – Juno Awards of 1999 (Canadian Academy of Recording Arts and Sciences)
- John Rogers – Just for Laughs (Just for Laughs Comedy Festival)
- Seán Cullen – Comedy Now! – Seán Cullen: Wood, Cheese and Children (CTV)

== Best Performance in a Performing Arts Program or Series ==
- Joni Mitchell – Joni Mitchell: Painting With Words and Music (Insight Productions)
- José Navas – Dances for a Small Screen (Taler Group/Triptych Media/Hammond Associates)
- Karen Kain – Karen Kain: Dancing In The Moment (CBC)
- Angela Song – Variations on a New Generation

== Best Performance in a Preschool Program or Series ==
- Jayne Eastwood – Noddy – The Trouble with Truman (Catalyst Entertainment)
- Sean McCann – Noddy (Catalyst Entertainment)
- Rob Mills – Ruffus the Dog (YTV/Radical Sheep Productions)
- James Rankin – Scoop and Doozie (Queen Bee Productions)
- Bob Stutt – Sesame Park (CBC)

== Best Performance in a Children's or Youth Program or Series ==
- Meredith Henderson – The Adventures of Shirley Holmes – The Case of the Crooked Comic (Credo Entertainment/Forefront Entertainment)
- Jonathan Torrens – Jonovision (CBC)
- Corey Sevier – Lassie (YTV/Cinar)
- Maurice Dean Wint – The Sweetest Gift (Hallmark Entertainment/Temple Street Productions/Showtime)
- Brent Carver – Whiskers (Les Productions La Fête/Showtime)

== Best News Anchor ==
- Peter Mansbridge – The National/CBC News (CBC)
- Gloria Macarenko – Broadcast One – Swissair Crash/Nisga'a Debate
- Lisa LaFlamme – CTV National News – Shooting at Columbine High/Tragedy in Taber

== Best Reportage ==
- Tom Kennedy – The National/CBC News – Shelter Blast (CBC)
- Paula Newton – CTV National News – Kosovo Refugees (CTV)
- Tom Walters – CTV National News – Swissair Flight 111 (CTV)
- Tom Clark – CTV National News – Target Belgrade (CTV)
- Avis Favaro – CTV National News – Whistleblower Doctor (CTV)

== Best Information Segment ==
- Tracie Tighe, Steve Tonon – Venture – King of the Hill (CBC)
- David Joy, Jonathan Craven – On the Road Again (CBC Television)
- Jeff Hodges, Catherine Annau – Studio 2 – Power Refugees (TVOntario)
- Carmen Merrifield, Anna Maria Tremonti – The Magazine (CBC Newsworld)
- Wendy Trueman, Wei Chen – W5 – A Wing & A Prayer (CTV)
- Wendy Trueman, Wei Chen – W5 – Life & Death (CTV)
- Gerry Wagschal, Jim O'Connell – W5 – Buyer Beware (CTV)

== Best Host or Interviewer in a News or Talk/General Information Program or Series ==
- Wendy Mesley – Undercurrents – Stacking the Deck/Pushing Pills/Speech Circuit (CBC)
- Ralph Benmergui – Benmergui Live (CBC Newsworld)
- Avi Lewis – CounterSpin (CBC Newsworld)
- Alison Smith – World Report (CBC Newsworld)
- Linden MacIntyre – the fifth estate (CBC)
- David Suzuki – The Nature of Things (CBC)

== Best Host in a Lifestyle/Practical Information, or Performing Arts Program or Series ==
- Brian Linehan – Linehan – Judy Collins/Wendy Crewson/James Woods (Electric Entertainment)
- Kevin Brauch – Canadian Gardening, Season III (Corus Entertainment)
- Wayne Rostad – On the Road Again (CBC Television)
- Kevin Frank – Pet Project – (Life Network)
- Ken Kostick – What's for Dinner? (Breakthrough Entertainment)
- Mary Jo Eustace – What's for Dinner? (Breakthrough Entertainment)

== Best Sportscaster ==
- Chris Cuthbert – CFL on CBC (CBC Sports)
- Ron MacLean – 1998 Commonwealth Games (CBC Sports)
- Brian Williams – 1998 Molson Indy Toronto (CBC Sports)
- Vic Rauter – TSN Championship Curling – The Labatt Brier Semi-Final (TSN)
- Jim Van Horne – SportsCentre (TSN)

== Best Photography in a Dramatic Program or Series ==
- Derick Underschultz – Total Recall 2070 – Restitution (ONtv/Alliance Atlantis)
- Steve Danyluk – Emily of New Moon (Salter Street Films/Cinar)
- Michael McMurray – Earth: Final Conflict (Atlantis Films)
- Laszlo George – Scandalous Me: The Jacqueline Susann Story (Alliance Atlantis Productions)
- Robert Saad – Sleeping Dogs Lie (Sullivan Entertainment)

== Best Photography in a Comedy, Variety, Performing Arts Program or Series ==
- David A. Greene – Water, Earth, Air, Fire – Dragon Tango (BravoFACT/Paulus Productions)
- David A. Greene – La Danza – Quartetto Gelato (Quartetto Gelato)
- Dennis Jones – The 1998 Canadian Country Music Awards (Canadian Country Music Association)

== Best Photography in an Information Program or Series ==
- Paul Freer – W5 – A Wing & A Prayer (CTV)
- Willie Lypko – Vantage Women of Originality Awards (Jann Arden/Universal Concerts)
- Wayne Abbott – Vantage Women of Originality Awards (Jann Arden/Universal Concerts)
- Colin Allison – the fifth estate – CBC
- Stephane Brisson – CTV National News – Library Lifesavers (CTV)
- Ross MacIntosh – CTV National News – Deadly Detergents (CTV)

== Best Photography in a Documentary Program or Series ==
- German Gutierrez, Claude-Julie Parisot – Insectia – Wicked Butterflies (Pixcom/Cineteve/Discovery Channel)
- Rudolf Kovanic – Baboon Tales (Tamarin Productions)
- John Westheuser – East Side Showdown (NFB)
- Richard Stringer – Exhibit A: Secrets of Forensic Science – Season 2 (Kensington Communications)
- Robert Melichar – Forbidden Places (MapleRock Entertainment)

== Best Visual Effects ==
- Jon Campfens, Barb Benoit, John Cox, Mark Savela – Due South – Call of the Wild Part 2 (Alliance Films)
- Gary Mueller – Lexx – The Net (Salter Street Films/CHUM Television)
- Jon Campfens, David Alexander, Van LaPointe, Joel Skeete – Total Recall 2070 – Machine Dreams (ONtv/Alliance Atlantis)
- Jon Campfens, David Alexander, Ray Caesar, Dug Claxton – Total Recall 2070 – Brain Fever (ONtv/Alliance Atlantis)
- Peter Mastalyr, Bernie Melanson, Paul Cox, Robert Appleby, Rob Egan – Twisteeria (Scintilla Entertainment)

== Best Picture Editing in a Dramatic Program or Series ==
- Ralph Brunjes – Milgaard (Barna-Alper Productions/Bar Harbour Films/Marble Island Pictures)
- Allan Lee – Da Vinci's Inquest (Haddock Entertainment, Barna-Alper Productions, Alliance Atlantis Productions, CBC)
- Dean Evans – Incredible Story Studios (Mind's Eye Entertainment)
- Daria Ellerman – Stargate SG-1 (Stargate SG-1 Productions)
- André Corriveau – The Tale of Teeka (Galafilm/Triptych Media)

== Best Picture Editing in an Information Program or Series ==
- Leslie Steven Onody – the fifth estate – Bad Blood (CBC)
- Roger Lefebvre – On the Road Again (CBC Television)
- Zsolt Luka, Jason Levy – Popular Mechanics For Kids (SDA Productions)
- Steve Tonon – Venture (CBC)
- Andre Lapalme – W5 – A Game of Risk (CTV)
- Steve Thomson – Venture (CBC)

== Best Picture Editing in a Documentary Program or Series ==
- Manfred Becker – Hitman Hart: Wrestling with Shadows (NFB, High Road Productions)
- Giorgio Saturnino – The Bunny Years (Upfront Entertainment)
- Nick Hector – The Dragon's Egg (TVOntario)
- Shelly Hamer – Baboon Tales (Tamarin Productions)
- Dominique Champagne – Killer Cults
- Hélène Girard – Chile, Obstinate Memory (NFB)

== Best Picture Editing in a Comedy, Variety, Performing Arts Program or Series ==
- Vesna Svilanovic – Dances for a Small Screen (Taler Group/Triptych Media/Hammond Associates)
- Jack Walker – Cynthia (CBC)
- Aaron Woodley – La Danza – Quartetto Gelato (Quartetto Gelato)
- Allan Maclean, Todd Foster, Keith Bradley, Eric Campbell, Gregg Antworth – This Hour Has 22 Minutes New Year's Eve Special (Salter Street Films/CBC)
- Aaron Woodley – Water, Earth, Air, Fire (BravoFACT/Paulus Productions)

== Best Production Design or Art Direction in a Dramatic Program or Series ==
- Katterina Keith, Ian Nothnagel – Dead Man's Gun – My Brother's Keeper (Vidatron Entertainment Group)
- Sandra Kybartas, Armando Sgrignuoli – Due South – Call of the Wild Part 2 (Alliance Films)
- Don McEwen, Zoe Sakellaropoulo, Dan Owens, Perri Gorrara – Emily of New Moon (Salter Street Films/Cinar)
- Alan MacLeod, Graeme Morphy – Pit Pony (Cochran Entertainment)
- Barbara Dunphy – Shot Through the Heart (Alliance Atlantis/BBC/Company Pictures/LeFrak Productions/Transatlantic Media Associates)

== Best Production Design or Art Direction in a Non-Dramatic Program or Series ==
- Brian Perchaluk – Journey: A Mythical Dance Fantasy (Caplette-Paquin Productions)
- Lloyd Brown, Andrew Kinsella – Cynthia (CBC)
- Tom Anthes – The Bette Show (Salter Street Films)
- Stephen Osler, Tom Anthes – This Hour Has 22 Minutes New Year's Eve Special (Salter Street Films/CBC)
- Steve Osborne, Danny Chan – West Coast Music Awards

== Best Costume Design ==
- Nicoletta Massone – Big Bear (Telefilm Canada/Productions Télé-Action/Kanata Productions)
- Kate Rose – Emily of New Moon (Salter Street Films/Cinar)
- Ruth Secord – Happy Christmas, Miss King (Sullivan Entertainment)
- Laurie Drew – La Femme Nikita (Baton Broadcasting/Fireworks Entertainment)
- Lorraine Carson – Nothing Too Good for a Cowboy (Alliance Communications/Milestone Productions)
- Ruth Secord – Sleeping Dogs Lie (Sullivan Entertainment)

== Best Achievement in Makeup ==
- Pierre Saindon – Big Bear (Telefilm Canada/Productions Télé-Action/Kanata Productions)
- Susan Exton-Stranks, Marilyn O'Quinn – Justice (Alliance Atlantis Productions)
- Monica Huppert, Jan Newman, David Dupuis, Adam Behr – Stargate SG-1 – Holiday (Stargate SG-1 Productions)
- Jayne Dancose, Gitte Axen, Tibor Farkas, Fay von Schroeder – The Outer Limits (Atlantis Films/Trilogy Entertainment)
- Marilyn O'Quinn, Gordon J. Smith – Total Recall 2070 (ONtv/Alliance Atlantis)

== Best Overall Sound in a Dramatic Program or Series ==
- Allen Ormerod, Steve Baine, Scott Shepherd, John Thomson – Total Recall 2070 – Machine Dreams Part 1 (ONtv/Alliance Atlantis)
- Sebastian Salm, Paul A. Sharpe, Jim Eustace, John Sievert, Dean Giammarco – Da Vinci's Inquest -The Hunt (Haddock Entertainment/Barna-Alper Productions/Alliance Atlantis/CBC)
- Steve Baine, Scott Shepherd, Allen Ormerod, Daniel Latour – La Femme Nikita (Baton Broadcasting/Fireworks Entertainment)
- Marcel Duperreault, Jason Frederickson, Todd Araki, Kirk Furniss – Shadow Raiders (Mainframe Entertainment)
- Guy Francoeur, Bruno Ruffolo, Serge Beauchemin, Luc Boudrias – The Tale of Teeka (Galafilm/Triptych Media)

== Best Sound in a Comedy, Variety, or Performing Arts Program or Series ==
- Ron Searles – Karen Kain: Dancing In The Moment (CBC)
- Floyd Burrell, Ron Searles, Peter Campbell, Ian Dunbar, Simon Bowers – Cynthia (CBC)
- Joni Mitchell, Simon Bowers – Joni Mitchell: Painting With Words and Music (Insight Productions)
- Doug McClement, Ian Dunbar, Howard Baggley, Peter Mann, Simon Bowers – Juno Awards of 1999 – (Canadian Academy of Recording Arts and Sciences)
- Wayne Kozak – Twisteeria (Scintilla Entertainment)

== Best Sound in an Information/Documentary Program or Series ==
- Steven Gurman, Richard Betanzos, Cory Rizos – The War of 1812 – Or Leave Our Bones Upon Them (Galafilm)
- James Ho Lim, Damian Kearns, Ian Challis – Life and Times – Lorne Greene (CBC)
- George Brook, Andrew Huggett, Colin Savage Schlachta – North-West Mounted Police – The Great March (GAPC Entertainment)
- Christopher T. Welch, Elma Bello, Alison Clark – The Nature of Things – Dead Heat (CBC)
- Daniel Pellerin, Sue Conley, Keith Elliott, Gary Bruckner, Stephen Barden, Mark Zsifkovits, Rob Wright – The View from Here (TVOntario)

== Best Sound Editing in a Dramatic Program or Series ==
- Stephen Barden, Joe Bracciale, Craig Henighan, E. Angie Pajek – Total Recall 2070 – Machine Dreams Part 1 (ONtv/Alliance Atlantis)
- John Douglas Smith, Tom Bjelic, Richard Harkness – Earth: Final Conflict (Atlantis Films)
- Marc Perlman, Ken Cade, Brian Campbell, Real Gauvreau – The Outer Limits (Atlantis Films/Trilogy Entertainment)
- Jane Tattersall, Julie Saragosa, Fred Brennan, Mark Shnuriwsky, Michele Cook – Da Vinci's Inquest -The Hunt (Haddock Entertainment/Barna-Alper Productions/Alliance Atlantis/CBC
- Dan Sexton, Danielle McBride, Steve Gorman – Milgaard (Barna-Alper Productions/Bar Harbour Films/Marble Island Pictures)

== Best Original Music Score for a Program or Miniseries ==
- Gaetan Gravel, Serge Laforest – Out of Mind: The Stories of H. P. Lovecraft (Cine Qua Non Films)
- Clode Hamelin – Big Bear (Telefilm Canada/Productions Télé-Action/Kanata Productions)
- Jonathan Goldsmith – The Girl Next Door (FTM Productions/Shostak-Rossner Productions, World International Network)
- Lou Pomanti – The Inventors' Specials – The Inventors' Specials: Edison: The Wizard of Light (Devine Entertainment)
- John Welsman – Marie Curie: More Than Meets the Eye (Devine Entertainment)
- Mark Korven – Win, Again! (CBC)

== Best Original Music Score for a Dramatic Series ==
- Tom Thorney, Brent Barkman, Pete Coulman, Carl Lenox, Tim Thorney – Rolie Polie Olie (Nelvana/Métal Hurlant Productions)
- Christopher Dedrick – Emily of New Moon (Salter Street Films/Cinar)
- Claude Foisy – First Wave (Sugar Entertainment/American Zoetrope)
- Rob Bryanton, Jack Semple – Incredible Story Studios – Mars Attack (Mind's Eye Entertainment)
- Zoran Boris – Total Recall 2070 (ONtv/Alliance Atlantis)
- Rob Bryanton – Incredible Story Studios – Dirty Pool (Mind's Eye Entertainment)

== Best Original Music Score for a Documentary Program or Series ==
- Mark Korven – A Scattering of Seeds: The Creation of Canada – First Lady of the Yukon: Martha Black (White Pine Pictures)
- Edmund Eagan – Man Alive (CBC)
- Fred Mollin – Exhibit A: Secrets of Forensic Science – Season 2 (Kensington Communications)
- John Sereda – John McCrae's War: In Flanders Fields (NFB)
- Andrew Huggett – North-West Mounted Police (GAPC Entertainment)
- Ken Myhr – The Nature of Things – Dead Heat (Canadian Broadcasting Corporation)

== Special awards ==
- Gordon Sinclair Award For Broadcast Journalism – David Studer
- John Drainie Award – Pierre Berton
- Earle Grey Award – Jayne Eastwood
- Margaret Collier Award – Suzette Couture
- Gemini Award for Outstanding Technical Achievement – Bell TV
- Canada Award – Lesley Ann Patten, Kent Martin – Loyalties
- Academy Achievement Award – Gordon Craig
- Chrysler's Canada's Choice Award – Frank Siracusa, David Cole, Paul Gross, R.B. Carney – Due South
