= Canadian Screen Award for Best Supporting Actor in a Drama Program or Series =

Discontinued annual Canadian media award

The Canadian Screen Award for Best Supporting Actor in a Drama Series or Program is an annual Canadian television award, presented by the Academy of Canadian Cinema and Television to the best supporting performance by an actor in a Canadian dramatic television series or television film. Previously presented as part of the Gemini Awards, since 2013 it has been presented as part of the Canadian Screen Awards.

Originally, only a single award for supporting actor was presented, without regard to the distinction between series, miniseries or television films. At the 10th Gemini Awards in 1995, separate awards were instituted for supporting actor in a continuing television series and supporting actor in a television film or miniseries; the separate awards were presented until the Gemini Awards were merged into the Canadian Screen Awards, and since the 1st Canadian Screen Awards in 2012 there has again only been a single category presented for all three types of content.

In August 2022, the Academy announced that beginning with the 11th Canadian Screen Awards in 2023, a gender-neutral award for Best Supporting Performance in a Drama Program or Series will be presented.

== 1980s ==
| Year | Actor | Title | Ref |
|---|---|---|---|
1986; 1st Gemini Awards
| 1986; 1st Gemini Awards | Richard Farnsworth | Anne of Green Gables | |
| 1986; 1st Gemini Awards | Bernard Behrens | Turning to Stone | |
| 1986; 1st Gemini Awards | Thomas Peacocke | Oakmount High | |
| 1986; 1st Gemini Awards | Douglas Rain | Love and Larceny | |
| 1986; 1st Gemini Awards | R. H. Thomson | Canada's Sweetheart: The Saga of Hal C. Banks | |
1987; 2nd Gemini Awards
| 1987; 2nd Gemini Awards | Eugene Clark | Night Heat | |
| 1987; 2nd Gemini Awards | Robert Joy | The Prodigious Hickey | |
| 1987; 2nd Gemini Awards | Sean McCann | Night Heat | |
| 1987; 2nd Gemini Awards | Albert Schultz | Going Home | |
| 1987; 2nd Gemini Awards | R. H. Thomson | Ford: The Man and the Machine | |
1988; 3rd Gemini Awards
| 1988; 3rd Gemini Awards | Wayne Robson | And Then You Die | |
| 1988; 3rd Gemini Awards | Henry Beckman | Family Reunion | |
| 1988; 3rd Gemini Awards | Peter Boretski | Chasing Rainbows | |
| 1988; 3rd Gemini Awards | Gary Reineke | The King Chronicle | |
| 1988; 3rd Gemini Awards | Sandy Webster | The King Chronicle | |
1989; 4th Gemini Awards
| 1989; 4th Gemini Awards | Jan Rubeš | Two Men | |
| 1989; 4th Gemini Awards | John Bayliss | 9B | |
| 1989; 4th Gemini Awards | Michael Ironside | One Boy, One Wolf, One Summer | |
| 1989; 4th Gemini Awards | Tony Rosato | Night Heat | |
| 1989; 4th Gemini Awards | Vladek Sheybal | Champagne Charlie | |

== 1990s ==
| Year | Nominee | Title | Ref |
|---|---|---|---|
1990; 5th Gemini Awards
| 1990; 5th Gemini Awards | Joe Flaherty | Looking for Miracles | |
| 1990; 5th Gemini Awards | Michael Ball | The Private Capital | |
| 1990; 5th Gemini Awards | Shawn Lawrence | Saying Goodbye: "The First Snowfall" | |
| 1990; 5th Gemini Awards | Eugene Lipinski | Love and Hate: The Story of Colin and JoAnn Thatcher | |
| 1990; 5th Gemini Awards | Karl Pruner | E.N.G. | |
1991; 6th Gemini Awards
| 1991; 6th Gemini Awards | Kenneth Welsh | Deadly Betrayal: The Bruce Curtis Story | |
| 1991; 6th Gemini Awards | Bruce Greenwood | The Little Kidnappers | |
| 1991; 6th Gemini Awards | Arthur Grosser | Urban Angel | |
| 1991; 6th Gemini Awards | Anthony Sherwood | Street Legal | |
| 1991; 6th Gemini Awards | Ian Tracey | Rookies | |
| 1991; 6th Gemini Awards | Gordon Michael Woolvett | Princes in Exile | |
1992; 7th Gemini Awards
| 1992; 7th Gemini Awards | Jonathan Welsh | E.N.G. | |
| 1992; 7th Gemini Awards | Nigel Bennett | Forever Knight | |
| 1992; 7th Gemini Awards | Robert Joy | Grand Larceny | |
| 1992; 7th Gemini Awards | Michael Mahonen | Road to Avonlea | |
| 1992; 7th Gemini Awards | Kenneth Welsh | Grand Larceny | |
1993; 8th Gemini Awards
| 1993; 8th Gemini Awards | Wayne Robson | The Diviners | |
| 1993; 8th Gemini Awards | Brian Dooley | The Boys of St. Vincent | |
| 1993; 8th Gemini Awards | Peter MacNeill | Gross Misconduct: The Life of Brian Spencer | |
| 1993; 8th Gemini Awards | Alex McArthur | Woman on the Run: The Lawrencia Bembenek Story | |
| 1993; 8th Gemini Awards | R. H. Thomson | Road to Avonlea | |
1994; 9th Gemini Awards
| 1994; 9th Gemini Awards | Bernard Behrens | Coming of Age | |
| 1994; 9th Gemini Awards | Aidan Devine | Dieppe | |
| 1994; 9th Gemini Awards | Graham Harley | Dieppe | |
| 1994; 9th Gemini Awards | John Hemphill | Sodbusters | |
| 1994; 9th Gemini Awards | Ron Lea | Street Legal | |
1995; 10th Gemini Awards
| 1995; 10th Gemini Awards | Dramatic Series | | |
| 1995; 10th Gemini Awards | Nigel Bennett | Forever Knight | |
| 1995; 10th Gemini Awards | Dakota House | North of 60 | |
| 1995; 10th Gemini Awards | Michael Mahonen | Road to Avonlea | |
| 1995; 10th Gemini Awards | Lubomir Mykytiuk | North of 60 | |
| 1995; 10th Gemini Awards | Beau Starr | Due South | |
| 1995; 10th Gemini Awards | Television Film or Miniseries | | |
| 1995; 10th Gemini Awards | Brent Carver | Last Rights | |
| 1995; 10th Gemini Awards | Robert Ito | Trial at Fortitude Bay | |
| 1995; 10th Gemini Awards | Gordon Pinsent | Due South: "Victoria's Secret" | |
| 1995; 10th Gemini Awards | Christopher Plummer | Harrison Bergeron | |
| 1995; 10th Gemini Awards | Rod Steiger | Choices of the Heart: The Margaret Sanger Story | |
1996; 11th Gemini Awards
| 1996; 11th Gemini Awards | Dramatic Series | | |
| 1996; 11th Gemini Awards | Lubomir Mykytiuk | North of 60 | |
| 1996; 11th Gemini Awards | Nathaniel Arcand | North of 60 | |
| 1996; 11th Gemini Awards | David Hewlett | Traders | |
| 1996; 11th Gemini Awards | Michael Mahonen | Road to Avonlea | |
| 1996; 11th Gemini Awards | Timothy Webber | North of 60 | |
| 1996; 11th Gemini Awards | Television Film or Miniseries | | |
| 1996; 11th Gemini Awards | Al Waxman | Net Worth | |
| 1996; 11th Gemini Awards | Graham Greene | The Outer Limits: "A Stitch in Time" | |
| 1996; 11th Gemini Awards | Stuart Margolin | Mother Trucker: The Diana Kilmury Story | |
| 1996; 11th Gemini Awards | Carl Marotte | Net Worth | |
| 1996; 11th Gemini Awards | Dean McDermott | Lives of Girls and Women | |
| 1996; 11th Gemini Awards | Peter Outerbridge | Captive Heart: The James Mink Story | |
1997; 12th Gemini Awards
| 1997; 12th Gemini Awards | Dramatic Series | | |
| 1997; 12th Gemini Awards | Patrick McKenna | Traders | |
| 1997; 12th Gemini Awards | Matthew Ferguson | Nikita | |
| 1997; 12th Gemini Awards | Chris Leavins | Traders | |
| 1997; 12th Gemini Awards | Richard McMillan | Black Harbour | |
| 1997; 12th Gemini Awards | Michael Wade | Gullage's | |
| 1997; 12th Gemini Awards | Television Film or Miniseries | | |
| 1997; 12th Gemini Awards | Aidan Devine | The Arrow | |
| 1997; 12th Gemini Awards | Kim Coates | Dead Silence | |
| 1997; 12th Gemini Awards | Peter MacNeill | Giant Mine | |
| 1997; 12th Gemini Awards | Saul Rubinek | Hiroshima | |
| 1997; 12th Gemini Awards | Brent Stait | For Those Who Hunt the Wounded Down | |
1998; 13th Gemini Awards
| 1998; 13th Gemini Awards | Dramatic Series | | |
| 1998; 13th Gemini Awards | Kris Lemche | Emily of New Moon | |
| 1998; 13th Gemini Awards | David Hewlett | Traders | |
| 1998; 13th Gemini Awards | Michael Moriarty | PSI Factor: Chronicles of the Paranormal | |
| 1998; 13th Gemini Awards | Gordon Pinsent | Due South | |
| 1998; 13th Gemini Awards | Rick Roberts | Traders | |
| 1998; 13th Gemini Awards | Television Film or Miniseries | | |
| 1998; 13th Gemini Awards | Diego Matamoros | The Sleep Room | |
| 1998; 13th Gemini Awards | Denny Doherty | Pit Pony | |
| 1998; 13th Gemini Awards | Vincent Gale | Major Crime | |
| 1998; 13th Gemini Awards | Jonathan Scarfe | White Lies | |
1999; 14th Gemini Awards
| 1999; 14th Gemini Awards | Dramatic Series | | |
| 1999; 14th Gemini Awards | Gordon Pinsent | Power Play | |
| 1999; 14th Gemini Awards | Peter Blais | PSI Factor: Chronicles of the Paranormal | |
| 1999; 14th Gemini Awards | Shawn Doyle | The City | |
| 1999; 14th Gemini Awards | Michael Sarrazin | The City | |
| 1999; 14th Gemini Awards | Timothy Webber | Black Harbour | |
| 1999; 14th Gemini Awards | Television Film or Miniseries | | |
| 1999; 14th Gemini Awards | Hrothgar Mathews | Milgaard | |
| 1999; 14th Gemini Awards | Michael Riley | Win, Again! | |
| 1999; 14th Gemini Awards | Garwin Sanford | Milgaard | |
| 1999; 14th Gemini Awards | Kenneth Welsh | Scandalous Me: The Jacqueline Susann Story | |
| 1999; 14th Gemini Awards | Jaimz Woolvett | Milgaard | |

== 2000s ==
| Year | Actor | Title | Ref |
|---|---|---|---|
2000; 15th Gemini Awards
| 2000; 15th Gemini Awards | Dramatic Series | | |
| 2000; 15th Gemini Awards | Pedro Salvin | Amazon | |
| 2000; 15th Gemini Awards | Duncan Fraser | Da Vinci's Inquest | |
| 2000; 15th Gemini Awards | Jonathan Rannells | Power Play | |
| 2000; 15th Gemini Awards | Television Film or Miniseries | | |
| 2000; 15th Gemini Awards | Robert Wisden | The Sheldon Kennedy Story | |
| 2000; 15th Gemini Awards | Ardon Bess | One Heart Broken Into Song | |
| 2000; 15th Gemini Awards | Henry Czerny | External Affairs | |
| 2000; 15th Gemini Awards | Noel Fisher | The Sheldon Kennedy Story | |
| 2000; 15th Gemini Awards | Kenneth Welsh | External Affairs | |
2001; 16th Gemini Awards
| 2001; 16th Gemini Awards | Dramatic Series | | |
| 2001; 16th Gemini Awards | Garry Chalk | Cold Squad | |
| 2001; 16th Gemini Awards | Gregory Calpakis | Cold Squad | |
| 2001; 16th Gemini Awards | Rob LaBelle | First Wave | |
| 2001; 16th Gemini Awards | Stephen E. Miller | Da Vinci's Inquest | |
| 2001; 16th Gemini Awards | Sean Sullivan | The Associates | |
| 2001; 16th Gemini Awards | Television Film or Miniseries | | |
| 2001; 16th Gemini Awards | Brian Cox | Nuremberg | |
| 2001; 16th Gemini Awards | Colm Feore | Haven | |
| 2001; 16th Gemini Awards | Bruce Greenwood | Haven | |
| 2001; 16th Gemini Awards | Robert Joy | Bonhoeffer: Agent of Grace | |
| 2001; 16th Gemini Awards | Gerard Parkes | Blessed Stranger: After Flight 111 | |
2002; 17th Gemini Awards
| 2002; 17th Gemini Awards | Dramatic Series | | |
| 2002; 17th Gemini Awards | Garry Chalk | Cold Squad | |
| 2002; 17th Gemini Awards | Nigel Bennett | Lexx | |
| 2002; 17th Gemini Awards | Steve Cumyn | Paradise Falls | |
| 2002; 17th Gemini Awards | Bill MacDonald | Paradise Falls | |
| 2002; 17th Gemini Awards | Stuart Margolin | Tom Stone | |
| 2002; 17th Gemini Awards | Television Film or Miniseries | | |
| 2002; 17th Gemini Awards | Sam Waterston | The Matthew Shepard Story | |
| 2002; 17th Gemini Awards | Michel Forget | The Last Chapter | |
| 2002; 17th Gemini Awards | Jean Marchand | Trudeau | |
| 2002; 17th Gemini Awards | Guy Richer | Trudeau | |
| 2002; 17th Gemini Awards | Ron White | Tagged: The Jonathan Wamback Story | |
2003; 18th Gemini Awards
| 2003; 18th Gemini Awards | Dramatic Series | | |
| 2003; 18th Gemini Awards | Peter MacNeill | The Eleventh Hour | |
| 2003; 18th Gemini Awards | Dan Bigras | The Last Chapter II: The War Continues | |
| 2003; 18th Gemini Awards | Matt Gordon | The Eleventh Hour | |
| 2003; 18th Gemini Awards | Stuart Margolin | Tom Stone | |
| 2003; 18th Gemini Awards | Television Film or Miniseries | | |
| 2003; 18th Gemini Awards | Ted Whittall | Agent of Influence | |
| 2003; 18th Gemini Awards | Aidan Devine | 100 Days in the Jungle | |
| 2003; 18th Gemini Awards | Aidan Devine | Scar Tissue | |
| 2003; 18th Gemini Awards | Adrien Dorval | 100 Days in the Jungle | |
| 2003; 18th Gemini Awards | Brendan Fletcher | 100 Days in the Jungle | |
2004; 19th Gemini Awards
| 2004; 19th Gemini Awards | Dramatic Series | | |
| 2004; 19th Gemini Awards | Michael Murphy | This Is Wonderland | |
| 2004; 19th Gemini Awards | Michael Healey | This Is Wonderland | |
| 2004; 19th Gemini Awards | Mark McKinney | Slings & Arrows | |
| 2004; 19th Gemini Awards | Eric Peterson | This Is Wonderland | |
| 2004; 19th Gemini Awards | Tom Rooney | This Is Wonderland | |
| 2004; 19th Gemini Awards | Television Film or Miniseries | | |
| 2004; 19th Gemini Awards | Ted Dykstra | Shattered City: The Halifax Explosion | |
| 2004; 19th Gemini Awards | Currie Graham | Cowboys and Indians: The J.J. Harper Story | |
| 2004; 19th Gemini Awards | Hakeem Kae-Kazim | Human Cargo | |
| 2004; 19th Gemini Awards | Hrothgar Mathews | Human Cargo | |
| 2004; 19th Gemini Awards | Jeremy Raymond | The Incredible Mrs. Ritchie | |
2005; 20th Gemini Awards
| 2005; 20th Gemini Awards | Dramatic Series | | |
| 2005; 20th Gemini Awards | Michael Murphy | This Is Wonderland | |
| 2005; 20th Gemini Awards | Dmitry Chepovetsky | ReGenesis | |
| 2005; 20th Gemini Awards | Noel Fisher | Godiva's | |
| 2005; 20th Gemini Awards | Michael Healey | This Is Wonderland | |
| 2005; 20th Gemini Awards | Tom Rooney | This Is Wonderland | |
| 2005; 20th Gemini Awards | Television Film or Miniseries | | |
| 2005; 20th Gemini Awards | Richard Zeppieri | Except the Dying | |
| 2005; 20th Gemini Awards | Stefan Arngrim | The Life | |
| 2005; 20th Gemini Awards | Jean-Pierre Bergeron | Prom Queen: The Marc Hall Story | |
| 2005; 20th Gemini Awards | Luke Kirby | Sex Traffic | |
| 2005; 20th Gemini Awards | Chris Potter | Sex Traffic | |
2006; 21st Gemini Awards
| 2006; 21st Gemini Awards | Dramatic Series | | |
| 2006; 21st Gemini Awards | Paul Soles | Terminal City | |
| 2006; 21st Gemini Awards | Michael Filipowich | Charlie Jade | |
| 2006; 21st Gemini Awards | Michael McMurtry | Godiva's | |
| 2006; 21st Gemini Awards | Michael Murphy | This Is Wonderland | |
| 2006; 21st Gemini Awards | Rick Tae | Godiva's | |
| 2006; 21st Gemini Awards | Television Film or Miniseries | | |
| 2006; 21st Gemini Awards | Judah Katz | Canada Russia '72 | |
| 2006; 21st Gemini Awards | Gary Farmer | One Dead Indian | |
| 2006; 21st Gemini Awards | Ryan McDonald | Terry | |
| 2006; 21st Gemini Awards | Don McKellar | Prairie Giant | |
| 2006; 21st Gemini Awards | Dino Tavarone | Il Duce canadese | |
2007; 22nd Gemini Awards
| 2007; 22nd Gemini Awards | Dramatic Series | | |
| 2007; 22nd Gemini Awards | Stephen Ouimette | Slings & Arrows | |
| 2007; 22nd Gemini Awards | Dmitry Chepovetsky | ReGenesis | |
| 2007; 22nd Gemini Awards | Fred Ewanuick | Robson Arms | |
| 2007; 22nd Gemini Awards | Don McKellar | Slings & Arrows | |
| 2007; 22nd Gemini Awards | Haig Sutherland | Robson Arms | |
| 2007; 22nd Gemini Awards | Television Film or Miniseries | | |
| 2007; 22nd Gemini Awards | Jonathan Scarfe | Above and Beyond | |
| 2007; 22nd Gemini Awards | Shawn Doyle | Eight Days to Live | |
| 2007; 22nd Gemini Awards | Stuart Hughes | Booky Makes Her Mark | |
| 2007; 22nd Gemini Awards | Mark Taylor | Doomstown | |
| 2007; 22nd Gemini Awards | Eric Tsang | Dragon Boys | |
2008; 23rd Gemini Awards
| 2008; 23rd Gemini Awards | Dramatic Series | | |
| 2008; 23rd Gemini Awards | Jonas Chernick | The Border | |
| 2008; 23rd Gemini Awards | Thomas Craig | Murdoch Mysteries | |
| 2008; 23rd Gemini Awards | Jonny Harris | Murdoch Mysteries | |
| 2008; 23rd Gemini Awards | Shaun Johnston | Heartland | |
| 2008; 23rd Gemini Awards | Sam Neill | The Tudors | |
| 2008; 23rd Gemini Awards | Television Film or Miniseries | | |
| 2008; 23rd Gemini Awards | Peter MacNeill | Victor | |
| 2008; 23rd Gemini Awards | Ron Lea | Victor | |
| 2008; 23rd Gemini Awards | Michael Riley | St. Urbain's Horseman | |
| 2008; 23rd Gemini Awards | Saul Rubinek | The Trojan Horse | |
| 2008; 23rd Gemini Awards | R. H. Thomson | The Englishman's Boy | |
2009; 24th Gemini Awards
| 2009; 24th Gemini Awards | Dramatic Series | | |
| 2009; 24th Gemini Awards | Mpho Koaho | Soul | |
| 2009; 24th Gemini Awards | David Alpay | The Tudors | |
| 2009; 24th Gemini Awards | Jonny Harris | Murdoch Mysteries | |
| 2009; 24th Gemini Awards | Christopher Heyerdahl | Sanctuary | |
| 2009; 24th Gemini Awards | Wesley Williams | The Line | |
| 2009; 24th Gemini Awards | Television Film or Miniseries | | |
| 2009; 24th Gemini Awards | Hugh Dillon | Of Murder and Memory | |
| 2009; 24th Gemini Awards | Dylan Everett | Booky's Crush | |
| 2009; 24th Gemini Awards | Reda Guerinik | The Terrorist Next Door | |
| 2009; 24th Gemini Awards | Stuart Hughes | Booky's Crush | |

== 2010s ==
| Year | Actor | Title | Ref |
|---|---|---|---|
2010; 25th Gemini Awards
| 2010; 25th Gemini Awards | Dramatic Series | | |
| 2010; 25th Gemini Awards | Clé Bennett | The Line | |
| 2010; 25th Gemini Awards | Sergio Di Zio | Flashpoint | |
| 2010; 25th Gemini Awards | Genādijs Dolganovs | The Bridge | |
| 2010; 25th Gemini Awards | Sebastian Pigott | Being Erica | |
| 2010; 25th Gemini Awards | Mark Taylor | Flashpoint | |
| 2010; 25th Gemini Awards | Television Film or Miniseries | | |
| 2010; 25th Gemini Awards | Clé Bennett | Guns | |
| 2010; 25th Gemini Awards | Greg Bryk | Deadliest Sea | |
| 2010; 25th Gemini Awards | Colm Feore | Guns | |
| 2010; 25th Gemini Awards | Matt Frewer | Alice | |
| 2010; 25th Gemini Awards | Christopher Plummer | The Summit | |
| 2010; 25th Gemini Awards | Vincent Walsh | The Good Times Are Killing Me | |
2011; 26th Gemini Awards
| 2011; 26th Gemini Awards | Dramatic Series | | |
| 2011; 26th Gemini Awards | Sergio Di Zio | Flashpoint | |
| 2011; 26th Gemini Awards | Jesse Carere | Skins | |
| 2011; 26th Gemini Awards | John Dunsworth | Haven | |
| 2011; 26th Gemini Awards | Colm Feore | The Borgias | |
| 2011; 26th Gemini Awards | Matt Gordon | Rookie Blue | |
| 2011; 26th Gemini Awards | Noam Jenkins | Rookie Blue | |
| 2011; 26th Gemini Awards | Television Film or Miniseries | | |
| 2011; 26th Gemini Awards | Joshua Close | Sleepyhead | |
| 2011; 26th Gemini Awards | Nicholas Campbell | A Heartland Christmas | |
| 2011; 26th Gemini Awards | Atticus Mitchell | My Babysitter's a Vampire | |
| 2011; 26th Gemini Awards | Rufus Sewell | The Pillars of the Earth | |
2012; 1st Canadian Screen Awards
| 2012; 1st Canadian Screen Awards | Peter Outerbridge | John A.: Birth of a Country | |
| 2012; 1st Canadian Screen Awards | Michael Cram | Flashpoint | |
| 2012; 1st Canadian Screen Awards | Sergio Di Zio | Flashpoint | |
| 2012; 1st Canadian Screen Awards | Ryan Kennedy | Hannah's Law | |
| 2012; 1st Canadian Screen Awards | Peter Mooney | Camelot | |
2013; 2nd Canadian Screen Awards
| 2013; 2nd Canadian Screen Awards | Jordan Gavaris | Orphan Black | |
| 2013; 2nd Canadian Screen Awards | Sergio Di Zio | Flashpoint | |
| 2013; 2nd Canadian Screen Awards | Matt Gordon | Rookie Blue | |
| 2013; 2nd Canadian Screen Awards | Kevin Hanchard | Orphan Black | |
| 2013; 2nd Canadian Screen Awards | Michael Mando | Orphan Black | |
2014; 3rd Canadian Screen Awards
| 2014; 3rd Canadian Screen Awards | Jordan Gavaris | Orphan Black | |
| 2014; 3rd Canadian Screen Awards | Paul Amos | Lost Girl | |
| 2014; 3rd Canadian Screen Awards | Benz Antoine | 19-2 | |
| 2014; 3rd Canadian Screen Awards | Dan Petronijevic | 19-2 | |
| 2014; 3rd Canadian Screen Awards | Hugh Thompson | Forgive Me | |
2015; 4th Canadian Screen Awards
| 2015; 4th Canadian Screen Awards | Torben Liebrecht | X Company | |
| 2015; 4th Canadian Screen Awards | Callum Dunphy | Sex & Violence | |
| 2015; 4th Canadian Screen Awards | Woody Jeffreys | Strange Empire | |
| 2015; 4th Canadian Screen Awards | Bruce Ramsay | 19-2 | |
| 2015; 4th Canadian Screen Awards | Conrad Pla | 19-2 | |
2016; 5th Canadian Screen Awards
| 2016; 5th Canadian Screen Awards | Kevin Hanchard | Orphan Black | |
| 2016; 5th Canadian Screen Awards | Torben Liebrecht | X Company | |
| 2016; 5th Canadian Screen Awards | Simu Liu | Blood and Water | |
| 2016; 5th Canadian Screen Awards | Dan Petronijevic | 19–2 | |
| 2016; 5th Canadian Screen Awards | Evan Williams | Versailles | |
2017; 6th Canadian Screen Awards
| 2017; 6th Canadian Screen Awards | R. H. Thomson | Anne with an E | |
| 2017; 6th Canadian Screen Awards | Benz Antoine | 19–2 | |
| 2017; 6th Canadian Screen Awards | Greg Bryk | Mary Kills People | |
| 2017; 6th Canadian Screen Awards | Ennis Esmer | Brace for Impact | |
| 2017; 6th Canadian Screen Awards | Dan Petronijevic | 19–2 | |
2018; 7th Canadian Screen Awards
| 2018; 7th Canadian Screen Awards | R. H. Thomson | Anne with an E | |
| 2018; 7th Canadian Screen Awards | Salvatore Antonio | Mary Kills People | |
| 2018; 7th Canadian Screen Awards | Brent Carver | Save Me | |
| 2018; 7th Canadian Screen Awards | Louis Ferreira | Bad Blood | |
| 2018; 7th Canadian Screen Awards | Dan Petronijevic | Cardinal: Blackfly Season | |
2019; 8th Canadian Screen Awards
| 2019; 8th Canadian Screen Awards | Thom Allison | Killjoys | |
| 2019; 8th Canadian Screen Awards | Brendan Fehr | Daughter of the Wolf | |
| 2019; 8th Canadian Screen Awards | Brandon Oakes | Diggstown | |
| 2019; 8th Canadian Screen Awards | Rossif Sutherland | Believe Me: The Abduction of Lisa McVey | |
| 2019; 8th Canadian Screen Awards | Hugh Thompson | Forgive Me | |

== 2020s ==
| Year | Actor | Title | Ref |
|---|---|---|---|
2020; 9th Canadian Screen Awards
| 2020; 9th Canadian Screen Awards | Christopher Plummer | Departure | |
| 2020; 9th Canadian Screen Awards | Evan Buliung | Departure | |
| 2020; 9th Canadian Screen Awards | Jonny Harris | Murdoch Mysteries | |
| 2020; 9th Canadian Screen Awards | Joel Thomas Hynes | Trickster | |
| 2020; 9th Canadian Screen Awards | Kalani Queypo | Trickster | |
2021; 10th Canadian Screen Awards
| 2021; 10th Canadian Screen Awards | Tim Rozon | Wynonna Earp | |
| 2021; 10th Canadian Screen Awards | Meegwun Fairbrother | Burden of Truth | |
| 2021; 10th Canadian Screen Awards | Kevin Hanchard | Hudson & Rex | |
| 2021; 10th Canadian Screen Awards | Mpho Koaho | Diggstown | |
| 2021; 10th Canadian Screen Awards | Peter MacNeill | Moonshine | |
