= Andrea Brooks =

Canadian actress (born 1989)

- Born: Andrea K. Brooks; March 3, 1989 (age 37); Brantford, Ontario, Canada
- Occupations: Actress; model
- Years active: 2006–present
- Spouse: Riley Graydon (m. 2018)
- Children: 3

Andrea K. Brooks (born March 3, 1989) is a Canadian actress and model best known for portraying Faith Carter on the Hallmark series When Calls the Heart and Eve Teschmacher in The CW series Supergirl.

== Early life ==
Born in Brantford, Ontario, Brooks trained in figure skating, dancing and musical theatre from an early age. At the age of fifteen, she auditioned for the Disney film Ice Princess. She lost out on the role, but gained an agent. She attended the University of British Columbia, where she gained a BA in English Literature and Film Studies and an MA in Film Studies. She also speaks fluent French.

== Career ==
Having appeared in a variety of film and television productions, Brooks' major break came in 2015 when she was cast in the role of Nurse Faith Carter in the second season of Hallmark series When Calls the Heart. Her character received a mixed audience reception, due mainly to the threat she posed to the series central love story between Mountie Jack Thornton (Daniel Lissing) and teacher Elizabeth Thatcher (Erin Krakow). She continued as a series regular from season three. On June 17, 2022, the series was renewed for a tenth season.

In 2016, Brooks joined the cast of Supergirl when it was renewed for a second season. She originally auditioned for the role of Maggie Sawyer, although herself admitted that she did not feel that role was a "good fit". She was subsequently sent a further script to audition for the role of Janice. Having won the role, it was not until she received her first episode script that she discovered she would in fact be playing the role of Eve Teschmacher. She was promoted to the main cast for the series' fifth season.

In 2016 she appeared in the Hallmark television film A Wish for Christmas directed by Christie Will, whom Brooks had previously worked with in the 2006 short film Dysfunction.

Brooks played the lead role of Mandy Hamilton in the Hallmark original television film Destination Wedding, opposite Rafael Simon, which was broadcast in June 2017 as part of the channel's June Weddings series.

== Personal life ==
On November 30, 2019, Brooks gave birth to her first child with husband Riley Graydon, a girl. Her second child was born December 17, 2022. Her third child was born in November 2024.

== Filmography ==
=== Film ===
| Year | Title | Role | Notes |
|---|---|---|---|
| 2006 | Dysfunction | Teen | Short film |
| 2009 | What Goes Up | Sue | |
| 2010 | Percy Jackson & the Olympians: The Lightning Thief | Lotus Land Waitress | |
| 2010 | Dear Mr. Gacy | Stalked Girl | |
| 2011 | 50/50 | Attractive Woman #2 | |
| 2012 | The Company You Keep | Sharon Solarz's Daughter | |
| 2014 | The Acting Teacher | Amber / Blanche | Short Film |
| 2015 | No Men Beyond This Point | Young Helen Duvall | |
| 2017 | The Circle | Sky | |

=== Television ===
| Year | Title | Role | Notes |
|---|---|---|---|
| 2006 | Saved | Amy | Episode: "Secrets and Lies" |
| 2006 | Split Decision | Hot Senior | Television film |
| 2006 | Just a Phase | Jennifer | Television film |
| 2006 | Supernatural | Katie Burns | Episode: "No Exit" |
| 2007 | Devil's Diary | Effi | Television film |
| 2009 | Sorority Wars | Shawna | Television film |
| 2009–2011 | The Troop | Roxanne | Guest role (seasons 1-3): 3 episodes |
| 2010 | The Boy Who Cried Werewolf | Ashley Edwards | Television film |
| 2010 | Hellcats | Jemma Linkletter | Episode: "The Match Game" |
| 2011 | Geek Charming | Nicole Paterson | Television film |
| 2011 | The Haunting Hour: The Series | Justine | Episode: "Dreamcatcher" |
| 2012 | Fairly Legal | Emma Childs | Episode: "Satisfaction" |
| 2012 | The Secret Circle | Amelia Blake | Episode: "Prom" |
| 2012 | Primeval New World | Kate | Episode:"Undone" |
| 2012 | Radio Rebel | Cheerleader with Hairspray | Television film |
| 2013 | Supernatural | Maria / Gholandria the Wicked | Episode: "LARP and the Real Girl" |
| 2013 | Independence Daysaster | Eliza | Television film |
| 2013 | Jinxed | Caitlin O'Leary | Television film |
| 2014 | Motive | Parker Wexler | Episode:"Kiss of Death" |
| 2014 | Signed, Sealed, Delivered | Kimmi | Episode: "The Future Me" |
| 2014 | Zodiac: Signs of the Apocalypse | Sophie | Television film |
| 2014 | Til Death Do US Part | Cathy | Television film |
| 2015 | Dead People | Missy | Television film |
| 2015 | iZombie | Connie Roy | Episode: "Mr. Berserk" |
| 2015 | Unreal | Tanya | Recurring role (season 1): 4 episodes |
| 2015 | The Bridge | Kristen | Hallmark Channel film |
| 2015–present | When Calls the Heart | Faith Carter | Recurring role (seasons 2–5 & 7), main cast (seasons 6, 8–present) |
| 2016 | The Bridge Part 2 | Kristen | Television film |
| 2016 | Date With Love | Paige | Television film |
| 2016 | Twist of Fate | Lori | Television film |
| 2016 | Summer in the City | Pam | Television film |
| 2016 | Once Upon a Time | Charlotte | Episode: "A Bitter Draught" |
| 2016 | A Wish For Christmas | Molly | Hallmark Channel film |
| 2016–2021 | Supergirl | Eve Teschmacher | Recurring role (seasons 2–4), main cast (season 5), guest role (season 6); 46 episodes |
| 2017 | The Flash | Eve Teschmacher | Episode: "Dead or Alive" |
| 2017 | Bates Motel | Joanne Carlson | Episode: "The Convergence of the Twain" |
| 2017 | Destination Wedding | Mandy Hamilton | Hallmark Channel films |
| 2017 | A Harvest Wedding | Abby | Hallmark Channel films |
| 2018 | The Sweetest Heart | Chloe | Hallmark Channel films |
| 2018 | Jingle Around the Clock | Oakley | Hallmark Channel films |
| 2018 | Santa's Boots | Jenny | Television film |
| 2019 | In the Key of Love | Jennifer Colby | Hallmark Channel film |
| 2021 | Fishing for Love | Kendall | Television film |
| 2022 | Fishing for Love | Kendall | Television film |
| 2022 | The Wedding Fix | Gwen | Television film |
| 2022 | Romance to The Rescue | Kyra | Hallmark Channel film |
| 2022 | So Help Me Todd | Kim | Episode: "Pilot" |
| 2023 | A Lifelong Love | Annaka | Hallmark Movies & Mysteries film |
