= George Anthony (journalist) =

Canadian journalist (1940)

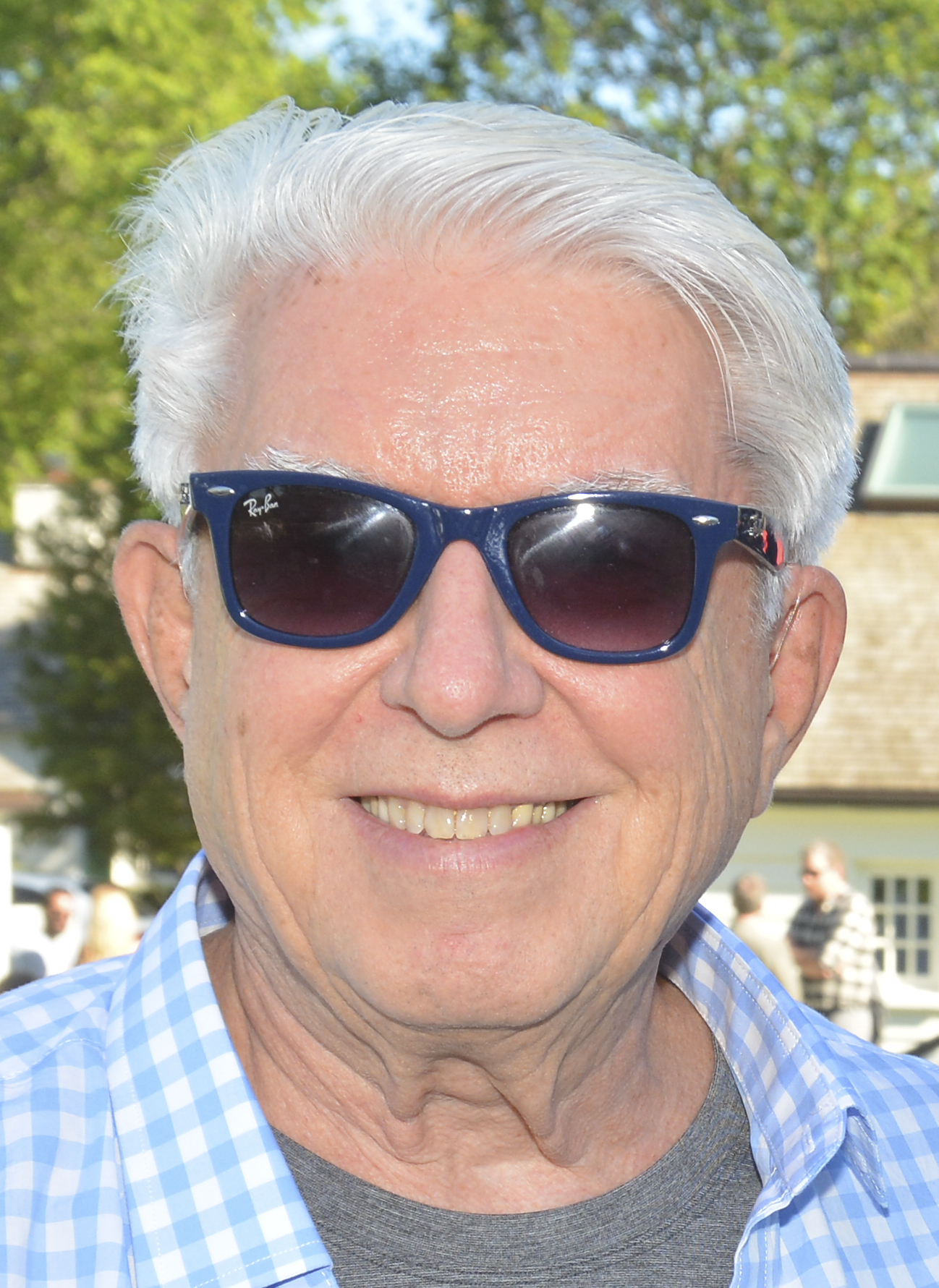
- Born: August 26, 1940 (age 86); Montreal, Quebec, Canada
- Occupations: Journalist, tv executive and biographer
- Known for: Rick Mercer Report, Starring Brian Linehan

George Anthony (born George Anthony Ganetakos; August 26, 1940) is a Canadian entertainment journalist, biographer and television executive.

== Career ==
Born in Montreal, Anthony began his career in entertainment as a reporter. He worked first for the Toronto Telegram until the paper folded on October 30, 1971. The next day, Anthony joined a group of ex-Telegram staffers to launch a new newspaper, the Toronto Sun, as one of its founding journalists. He was the Toronto Sun's original entertainment editor and also served as the paper's film, music, and theatre critic and entertainment columnist. With the exception of a four-year period from 1980 to 1984, Anthony worked at the Toronto Sun until 1990.

In addition to his daily columns at the Toronto Sun, Anthony hosted an entertainment interview show on Global TV from 1975 to 1980.

In November 1990, Anthony became the Creative Head of CBC Television Arts, Music, Science & Variety, responsible for the artistic aspects of all CBC Television's arts and variety programming. Anthony worked to bring some of Canada's best-loved series to air for CBC Television including Made in Canada/The Industry, This Hour Has 22 Minutes, Royal Canadian Air Farce and the Rick Mercer Report. He has been honoured nationally and internationally for his contribution the Canadian entertainment industry.

Anthony is a prominent supporter of and advocate for the Toronto International Film Festival, from its beginning days in 1976 when it was known as the Festival of Festivals and he was involved in securing appearances by high-profile actors, directors and producers. Anthony and his wife Gail are Lifetime Honorary Patrons of the Festival.

Anthony is the author of the critically acclaimed biography of Canadian television host Brian Linehan entitled Starring Brian Linehan: A Life Behind the Scenes, published in 2007 by McClelland & Stewart ISBN 978-0-7710-0757-6. He also collaborated on Next, the second autobiography of Canadian actor Gordon Pinsent, published in 2012 by McClelland & Stewart. ISBN 9780771071379.

== Awards ==
CBC Television programs under Anthony's watch have won more than 100 Gemini Awards. They have also received several international honours, including:

- 1992—Rose d’Or, Brian Orser: Night Moves
- 1993—Rose d’Or, The Kids in the Hall
- 1999 – Prix Italia, 32 Short Films About Glenn Gould
- 1999—International Emmy (Best Performing Arts), Karen Kain: Dancing In The Moment
- 2002—International Emmy (Best Performing Arts), Dracula: Pages from a Virgin’s Diary
- 2009—Rose d’Or Award (Comedy), The Rick Mercer Report

Anthony has been honoured nationally and internationally for his contributions to the Canadian entertainment industry. These awards include:

- 2002—Queen Elizabeth II Golden Jubilee Medal
- 2009—Honorary Rose d'Or
- 2013—Playback's Film and TV Hall of Fame.
- 2015—Academy Special Award, 2015 Canadian Screen Awards
