= Reluctant Angel =

- Directed by: John Helliker
- Produced by: Antony I. Ginnane (executive)
- Starring: Megan Follows, Jaimz Woolvett
- Release date: 1998
- Country: Canada
- Language: English

Reluctant Angel is a 1998 Canadian film directed by John Helliker and starring Megan Follows.

== Cast ==
- Megan Follows as Lisa / Cheryl
- Jaimz Woolvett as Donald
- James Gallanders as Jason
- Martin Villafona as Randy
- Anne Marie DeLuise as Carla
- Victor Ertmanis as Leo
- Jeff M. Hall as Gerry
- Paulette Mikuse as Arlene
- J. Winston Carroll as Mr. Levitt
- Simon Sinn as Mr. Chong
- Christina Collins as The Receptionist
