= MovieTelevision =

Canadian television series

MovieTelevision is a Canadian entertainment news series, which aired on Citytv from 1988 to 2006. The series aired reports on film, including interviews with actors and filmmakers, preview clips of upcoming films and coverage of film-related events such as the Toronto International Film Festival.

The series was launched in 1988 as a replacement for the network's longrunning talk show City Lights. It was initially cohosted by Brian Linehan and Jeanne Beker, with its title and format patterned on Citytv's FashionTelevision. However, Linehan was dissatisfied with the format, as it left him with far less time to conduct the in-depth interviews with actors which had been his specialty on City Lights, and he left the show after the first season.

Terry David Mulligan joined the show in the second season as a correspondent from Vancouver, but was not officially billed as a full cohost of the show at the time. For a while in the mid-1990s the show was billed as a "hostless" format, with nobody officially serving as the primary host of the program but both Beker and Mulligan continuing to report as correspondents; in later years, however, Beker and Mulligan were again billed as full co-hosts. After joining Citytv as an entertainment reporter, Traci Melchor also sometimes appeared as a correspondent in the mid-1990s.

Following the launch of Citytv's entertainment news sister station Star! in 1999, the series was added to that channel's schedule. In addition to new episodes, Star! also reran older episodes under the title Best of MovieTelevision.

The series was also syndicated, both to other Canadian television stations and internationally.

The series ceased production at the end of the 2005-06 television season, in advance of the network's sale to Rogers Media.
