= Charlie & Me =

- Written by: Karen Struck
- Directed by: David Weaver
- Starring: Tom Bosley; Jordy Benattar
- Theme music composer: Ron Ramin
- Country of origin: United States
- Original language: English

Production
- Producers: Gerald W. Abrams; Susan Murdoch; Tom Werheimer
- Cinematography: François Dagenais
- Editor: Ralph Brunjes
- Running time: 120 minutes
- Production company: Cypress Point Entertainment

Original release
- Network: Hallmark Channel
- Release: January 5, 2008

Charlie & Me is a made-for-TV movie that premiered on Hallmark Channel on January 5, 2008. Filmed on location in Ontario, Canada, the movie stars Tom Bosley as the title character and Jordy Benattar as his granddaughter.

== Plot ==
Casey Baker (Jordy Benattar) is a 12-year-old girl whose best friend is her grandfather, Charlie (Tom Bosley). Charlie has been like her surrogate parent since she was 4 years old, when Casey's mother died. Her still-grieving father, Jeffrey (James Gallanders), has kept his distance. When Jeffrey is away on a business trip, Charlie has a heart attack, and Casey finds herself alone making some critical decisions for her grandfather.

== Cast ==
- Tom Bosley as Charlie
- Jordy Benattar as Casey
- James Gallanders as Jeffrey
- Barclay Hope as Dr. Robert Graham

== Web exclusives ==
To drive viewers to their website, Hallmark Channel had a special prologue filmed that shows Casey as a grownup. The site also contains clips of a "video diary", where Casey (to camera) discusses such topics as public speaking, her pet iguana Louis, her dad, her mom, her crush at school, and her grandfather Charlie.

== Award nominations ==
- In 2008 Jordy Benattar was nominated for a Gemini Award for Best Performance by an Actress in a Leading Role in a Dramatic Program or Mini-Series.
- Karen Struck was a finalist for the 2008 Humanitas Prize in the Feature Film Category for the script, originally titled "When You Listen".

== Reception ==
Hallmark Channel did fairly well with the premiere of Charlie & Me. The channel ranked #6 in Prime Time (1.3 HH rating) for the week of 12/31/07-1/6/08 boosted by the premiere.
