= James Gallanders =

Canadian actor

- Born: February 9, 1970 (age 56); Scarborough, Ontario, Canada
- Education: York University
- Occupation: Actor
- Years active: 1996–present
- Spouse: Stacie Mistysyn (m. 2009)

James Gallanders (born February 9, 1970) is a Canadian actor. He studied at York University's Faculty of Fine Arts.

== Career ==
Born in Scarborough, Ontario, Canada, Gallanders began appearing on several television series before receiving his first role in the feature film Murder at 1600. In 1998 he appeared in three feature films, Reluctant Angel, the drama Babyface and the horror sequel Bride of Chucky, with Jennifer Tilly. The following year, Gallanders received a small role in the Agnieszka Holland drama The Third Miracle, with Ed Harris and Anne Heche and Prisoner of Love, featuring Naomi Campbell. In 2002, he portrayed 'Greg Sommers' in the direct-to-video sequel The Skulls II. He served as a voice artist in the horror film Saw II in 2005. In 2007, Gallanders portrayed the role of 'Major Brent Beardsly' in Shake Hands with the Devil, an award-winning historical war drama based on the Rwandan genocide.

Throughout his career, Gallanders has made a number of guest appearances on many television series. In 1996, he made his acting debut in Due South. From 1999 to 2000 he portrayed the role of 'Detective Michael Croft' in the short-lived CTV soap opera The City in which he had a recurring role. Many of Gallanders television credits include Millennium, La Femme Nikita, Mutant X, the American/Canadian version of Queer as Folk and Kevin Hill which only lasted one season. His most recent television work was in the Emmy Award-winning mini-series The Kennedys.

== Personal life ==
Gallanders married actress Stacie Mistysyn on August 29, 2009.

== Filmography ==
| Year | Title | Role | Notes |
|---|---|---|---|
| 1996 | Due South | Mark Ordover | Episode: "Body Language" |
| 1997 | Millennium | Missouri State Trooper | Episode: "The Wild and the Innocent" |
| 1997 | La Femme Nikita | Ornett | Episode: "Love" |
| 1997 | Murder at 1600 | Law Student | |
| 1997 | F/X: The Series | Kahil Bergeron | Episode: "House of Horrors" |
| 1997 | Major Crime | Murray Battaglia | Television film |
| 1997 | Psi Factor: Chronicles of the Paranormal | Bruce Farrell | Episode: "Second Sight/Chocolate Soldier" |
| 1998 | Reluctant Angel | Jason | |
| 1998 | Babyface | Jim | |
| 1998 | Bride of Chucky | Russ | |
| 1998 | PSI Factor: Chronicles of the Paranormal | Palimpsest | Episode: "Palimpsest" |
| 1999 | The Third Miracle | Brother Gregory | |
| 1999 | Prisoner of Love | Vince | |
| 1999-2000 | The City | Detective Michael Croft | Recurring role; 12 episodes |
| 2002 | Tracker | Rod Archer / Cole | Episode: "Without a Trace" |
| 2002 | Earth: Final Conflict | Reese | Episode: "Deep Sleep" |
| 2002 | The Skulls II | Greg Sommers | Direct-to-video |
| 2002 | Mutant X | Jay Minhouse | Episode: "Dancing on the Razor" |
| 2002 | Heart of a Stranger | | Television film |
| 2003 | Bliss | Frank | Episode: "Amazon" |
| 2004 | Starhunter | | Episode: "Rivals" |
| 2004 | Queer as Folk | Shane | Episode: season 4, episode 6 |
| 2005 | Sue Thomas: F.B.Eye | | Episode: "The Bounty Hunter" |
| 2005 | Kevin Hill | Frank Drake | Episode: "Through the Looking Glass" |
| 2005 | Plague City: SARS in Toronto | | Television film |
| 2005 | Missing | David Travis | Episodes: "Anything for the Baby" (parts 1 & 2) |
| 2005 | Saw II | | Voice |
| 2006 | Earthstorm | Captain Ben Halberstom | Television film |
| 2007 | Shake Hands with the Devil | Major Brent Beardsley | |
| 2007 | Charlie & Me | Jeffrey | Television film |
| 2008 | Murdoch Mysteries | Father Franks | Episode: "'Til Death Do Us Part" |
| 2008 | A Teacher's Crime | Dean Ryans | Television film |
| 2009 | Throwing Stones | Jack | Television film |
| 2009 | Hidden Crimes | Max Carver | Television film |
| 2011 | The Kennedys | Peter Lawford | Television mini-series; episode: "The Countdown to Tragedy" |
| 2016 | Mommy's Little Girl | Aaron Myers | Television film (Lifetime) |
| 2022 | Resident Alien | Jack Sennett | Episode: "The Weight" |
| 2024-2025 | The Way Home | Vic Augustine | |
