= The Late Show (radio program) =

Canadian radio documentary

The Late Show is a radio documentary program that first aired on CBC Radio One in the summer of 2008 with a second season in the Summer of 2010 and a third in 2011. Hosted by Gordon Pinsent, The Late Show presents documentaries which are essentially extended obituaries of ordinary, but interesting, Canadians who have recently died.
