= Hrothgar Mathews =

Canadian actor (born 1964)

- Born: January 27, 1964 (age 62); Toronto, Canada
- Occupation: Actor
- Spouse: Gabrielle Rose

Hrothgar Mathews (born January 27, 1964) is a Canadian actor known for his performance as Gill St. George in the 1999 television film Milgaard and Ned Yost in When Calls the Heart.

== Career ==
He has also played the recurring roles of Mark Fellows in Tom Stone, Det. Charlie Klotchko in Da Vinci's Inquest and its spinoff Da Vinci's City Hall, Ned Yost in When Calls the Heart, and Edwin Collar in Motherland: Fort Salem, and films including Johnny and Fathers & Sons. For his performance in Milgaard, Mathews won the Gemini Award for Best Supporting Actor in a Dramatic Program or Miniseries at the 14th Gemini Awards.

== Personal life ==
He is married to actress Gabrielle Rose and has two sons.

== Filmography ==
=== Film ===
Year	Title	Role	Notes
1990	Princes in Exile	Rick	
1994	The NeverEnding Story III	Nursery Truck Driver	
1996	Homeward Bound II: Lost in San Francisco	Animal Control Officer	
1996	Maternal Instincts	Mr. Doyle	
1996	Bad Moon	Flopsy	
1997	Excess Baggage	Fisherman Cop	
1997	Drive, She Said	Ernie	
1998	The Sleep Room	NFB Director	
1999	Johnny	Bob	
2000	Reindeer Games	Exit Guard	
2001	Turbulence 3: Heavy Metal	Benny Mitchell	Direct-to-video
2001	The Cave	David / Marcie's husband	
2001	The Rhino Brothers	Conrad	
2001	Ignition	Sgt. Douglas Penabad	
2002	D-Tox	Manny	
2003	The Core	Chief Engineer Mission Control	
2004	The Wild Guys	Robin	
2005	Severed	Eric	
2007	Normal	Jerry	
2007	Martian Child	ccommittee member	
2008	Mothers & Daughters	Town Hall Facilitator	
2009	A Gun to the Head	Sam	
2010	Smokin' Aces 2: Assassins' Ball	Agent Redstone	Direct-to-video
2010	Repeaters	Ed Logan	
2010	Fathers & Sons	Hrothgar	
2011	The Odds	Coach Fortier	
2013	Metallica: Through the Never	Truck Driver	
2014	Teen Lust	Paul	
2017	Meditation Park	Skinny Bylaw Officer	
2019	Light of My Life	Calvin	
2019	Two/One	Lance	

=== Television ===
Year	Title	Role	Notes
1992, 1993	Street Legal	Reporter No. 2	2 episodes
1993	Street Justice	Little Jimmy	Episode: "A Sense of Duty"
1993–1995	The X-Files	Various roles	4 episodes
1994	Snowbound: The Jim and Jennifer Stolpa Story	Rick Frazier	Television film
1995	Deadly Nightshade	Night Manager	Television film
1995	Hawkeye	Pvt. Henry Warder	Episode: "The Traitor"
1995	The Commish	Tommy Mills	Episode: "Cry Wolfe"
1995	M.A.N.T.I.S.	MIB No. 4	Episode: "Spider in the Tower"
1995	She Stood Alone: The Tailhook Scandal	Lowell Sheridan	Television film
1995	Strange Luck	Orville Mudd	Episode: "Last Chance"
1995	When the Vows Break	Dale	Television film
1995	Ebbie	Ralph	Television film
1995	Mixed Blessings	Mark	Television film
1996	A Kidnapping in the Family	FBI Agent Sowell	Television film
1996	In the Lake of the Woods	Nat Leming	Television film
1996	Sliders	Mr. Gale	2 episodes
1996	Mother, May I Sleep with Danger?	English Literature Instructor	Television film
1996	Night Visitors	John	Television film
1996	Justice on Wheels: The Diana Kilmury Story	Cowboys	Television film
1997	Contagious	First Medical Examiner	Television film
1997	Millennium	Art Nesbitt	Episode: "Loin Like a Hunting Flame"
1997	Murder in My Mind	Agent Lewis	Television film
1997	High Stakes	Corcanan	Television film
1997	Dead Man's Gun	Fred McNeil	Episode: "The Healer"
1997	Cloned	Dr. Mason	Television film
1997, 1998	Viper	Jake Lupo / Yancey Lofton	2 episodes
1998	Welcome to Paradox	Joe	Episode: "The Girl Who Was Plugged In"
1998	Jake and the Kid	The Major	Episode: "The Great Uranium Caper"
1998, 2002	Cold Squad	Det. Cliff Gordon	2 episodes
1998–2005	Da Vinci's Inquest	Charlie Klotchko / Warren Sykes	12 episodes
1999	Can of Worms	Throad Man	Television film
1999	Milgaard	Gill St. George	Television film
1999	36 Hours to Die	George	Television film
1999	G-Saviour	Philippe San Simeone	Television film
1999	Brotherhood of Murder	Robert Maxim	Television film
2000	Runaway Virus	Dr. Dean Winston	Television film
2000	Nuremberg	Thomas J. Dodd	Episode #1.1
2000	Scorn	MacMillan	Television film
2001	Mysterious Ways	Alex Sheridan	Episode: "19A"
2001	Stargate SG-1	Dr. Hamilton	Episode: "Prodigy"
2001	Seven Days	Alexander Trevaine	Episode: "Raven"
2001	Night Visions	Dr. Palmquist	Episode: "Now He's Coming Up the Stairs/Used Car"
2002	L.A. Law: The Movie	Warren	Television film
2002–2004	Tom Stone	Inspector Mark Fellows	5 episodes
2002	The Investigation	The Investigation	Television film
2003	The Dead Zone	Lt. Sandowski	Episode: "Visions"
2004	NTSB: The Crash of Flight 323	O'Donnell	Television film
2004	Human Cargo	Sergeant Macavoy	3 episodes
2004	Cable Beach	Sgt. Ed Campbell	Television film
2005–2006	Da Vinci's City Hall	Sgt. Charlie Klotchko	13 episodes
2006	Flight 93	Michael Woodward	Television film
2006	A Girl Like Me: The Gwen Araujo Story	Prosecutor	Television film
2006	Family in Hiding	Nahanee	Television film
2006	Deadly Skies	Press Secretary	Television film
2007	A Decent Proposal	Tony Evans	Television film
2007	Bury My Heart at Wounded Knee	Reverend Woods	Television film
2007	Supernatural	Grossman	Episode: "Bad Day at Black Rock"
2007	Second Sight	Dr. Victor Kaufman	Television film
2008	The Quality of Life	Sgt. Charlie Klotchko	Television film
2009	V	Doomed Man	Episode: "Pilot"
2010	Caprica	Dave	Episode: "Apotheosis"
2011	Goodnight for Justice	Harlan Ayles	Episode: "Goodnight for Justice"
2012	Fringe	Observer No. 1	Episode: "Letters of Transit"
2012	Kiss at Pine Lake	George	Television film
2013	Once Upon a Time	Carny	Episode: "The Evil Queen"
2013	Psych	Park Loner	Episode: "Psych: The Musical"
2013, 2014	Arctic Air	Mr. Klassen / Cal Fergus	2 episodes
2014	The Color of Rain	Ed	Television film
2014–present	When Calls the Heart	Ned Yost	96 episodes
2015	A Country Wedding	James	Television film
2015	Sugar Babies	Gilbert Woods	Television film
2015	Harvest Moon	Phil	Television film
2016	The Romeo Section	Kent	3 episodes
2016	Who Killed JonBenét?	Lou Smit	Television film
2017	Wedding March 2: Resorting to Love	Corinne's Father	Television film
2017	Same Time Next Week	Nate	Television film
2017	Damnation	Judge Alvin Van Hoof	Episode: "Sam Riley's Body"
2017	Final Vision	Paul Stombaugh	Television film
2018	Lost in Space	Official / Maureen's Boss	Episode: "Resurrection"
2018	The Bletchley Circle: San Francisco	Mitch Bloom	Episode: "Iron in War"
2018	Literally	Eric	Episode: "Chapter 5"
2019	Morning Show Mysteries	Donald	Episode: "A Murder in Mind"
2019	Garage Sale Mystery	Miles Wexford	Episode: "Searched & Seized"
2020	Love Under the Olive Tree	Tom Cabella	Television film
2020	Chateau Christmas	Sam Bennet	Television film
2020–2021	Motherland: Fort Salem	Edwin Collar	8 episodes
