= City Lights (1973 TV series) =

Canadian television series

City Lights is a Canadian television series hosted by Brian Linehan and produced by Citytv in Toronto, and syndicated throughout Canada, running from 1973 to 1988. It featured Linehan interviewing film and television celebrities about their roles and lives, either on location, or in studio. Linehan developed a reputation for well-researched questions and non-adversarial style.

In 1988, the series was replaced with MovieTelevision, an expanded magazine series cohosted by Linehan and Jeanne Beker. Linehan remained with the new show for a single season before leaving in 1989.
