= Win, Again! =

- Genre: Drama
- Written by: Gordon Pinsent
- Directed by: Eric Till
- Starring: Gordon Pinsent; Gabrielle Rose; Michael Riley; Leah Pinsent; Eric Peterson
- Theme music composer: Mark Korven
- Country of origin: Canada
- Original language: English

Production
- Producer: Robert Sherrin
- Cinematography: Nikos Evdemon
- Editor: T.C. Martin
- Running time: 90 minutes

Original release
- Network: CBC Television
- Release: January 17, 1999

Win, Again! is a Canadian television film, which was broadcast by CBC Television in 1999. Directed by Eric Till, the film stars Gordon Pinsent as Win Morrissey, a man from Nova Scotia who abandoned his family 16 years earlier to go on the run after being accused of a crime he did not commit, and is now returning home to reconcile with them after finally being exonerated.

The film also stars Gabrielle Rose as Win's wife Lois, who has moved on with a career in real estate and a new boyfriend; Michael Riley as their son John, a successful urban planner living in Toronto who resents his father's absence from his childhood; Leah Pinsent as John's girlfriend Julie; and Eric Peterson as Win's brother Cliff. Martha Gibson and Lawrence Dane also appear in supporting roles.

The film was Gordon Pinsent's first time ever acting in a project directly alongside his daughter Leah; although he had made a guest appearance in her sitcom Made in Canada the previous year, they did not have any scenes together at that time.

Gordon Pinsent was also the film's writer. It had originally been conceived and written as a six-episode drama series, but after several years of production delays caused by budget cutbacks at the CBC, the network asked Pinsent to condense it into a film.

The film was broadcast by CBC Television on January 17, 1999.

== Awards ==
Award	Date of ceremony	Category	Nominees	Result	Reference
Gemini Awards	November 7, 1999	Best Actor in a Dramatic Program or Miniseries	Gordon Pinsent	Nominated	
Gemini Awards	November 7, 1999	Best Actress in a Dramatic Program or Miniseries	Gabrielle Rose	Nominated	
Gemini Awards	November 7, 1999	Best Supporting Actor in a Dramatic Program or Miniseries	Michael Riley	Nominated	
Gemini Awards	November 7, 1999	Best Supporting Actress in a Dramatic Program or Miniseries	Leah Pinsent	Nominated	
Gemini Awards	November 7, 1999	Best Original Music in a Dramatic Program or Miniseries	Mark Korven	Nominated	
Gemini Awards	November 7, 1999	Best Writing in a Dramatic Program or Miniseries	Gordon Pinsent	Won	
