= Milgaard =

1999 TV Movie

- Genre: Drama
- Written by: Keith Ross Leckie; Alan Di Fiore
- Directed by: Stephen Williams
- Starring: Ian Tracey; Gabrielle Rose
- Country of origin: Canada
- Original language: English

Production
- Producers: Vibika Bianchi; Martin Harbury; Laura Lightbown
- Cinematography: David Frazee
- Editor: Ralph Brunjes
- Running time: 85 minutes
- Production companies: Barna-Alper Productions; Bar Harbour Films; Marble Island Pictures

Original release
- Network: CTV
- Release: April 11, 1999

Milgaard, also sometimes known as Hard Time: The David Milgaard Story, is a Canadian dramatic television film, which was broadcast by the CTV Television Network in 1999. The film centres on David Milgaard, a Canadian man who was wrongfully convicted in the 1969 rape and murder of Gail Miller, and his 22-year quest for justice until being released from prison in 1992.

The film stars Ian Tracey as David Milgaard and Gabrielle Rose as his mother Joyce Milgaard, as well as Tom Melissis, Garwin Sanford, Hrothgar Mathews, Jaimz Woolvett, Sabrina Grdevich, Bernie Coulson and Reagan Pasternak in supporting roles.

Larry Fisher, who had been arrested for Miller's murder and was awaiting trial in Saskatchewan at the time of the film's release, sought a court injunction banning the broadcast of the film on the grounds that it might prejudice his chance at a fair trial. Although the injunction was granted, the judge declined to ban the film nationwide, instead ruling only that CTV could not broadcast the film on its affiliates in Saskatchewan. The film was broadcast on April 11, 1999 across most of Canada, except Saskatchewan. A second injunction prevented CTV from rebroadcasting the film at all in October 1999, as by that time Fisher's trial was underway; this latter ban also prevented any clips of the film from being broadcast as part of the 14th Gemini Awards ceremony in November, as Fisher's trial had not yet concluded.

Following Fisher's conviction in late 1999, CTV rebroadcast the film on January 2, 2000 across Canada, including Saskatchewan.

== Awards ==
Award	Date of ceremony	Category	Nominees	Result	Reference
Gemini Awards	November 7, 1999	Best Television Movie or Miniseries	Vibika Bianchi, Laszlo Barna, Richard Findlay, Martin Harbury, Laura Lightbown	Won	
Gemini Awards	November 7, 1999	Best Actor in a Dramatic Program or Miniseries	Ian Tracey	Won	
Gemini Awards	November 7, 1999	Best Actress in a Dramatic Program or Miniseries	Gabrielle Rose	Nominated	
Gemini Awards	November 7, 1999	Best Supporting Actor in a Dramatic Program or Miniseries	Hrothgar Mathews	Won	
Gemini Awards	November 7, 1999	Best Supporting Actor in a Dramatic Program or Miniseries	Garwin Sanford	Nominated	
Gemini Awards	November 7, 1999	Best Supporting Actor in a Dramatic Program or Miniseries	Jaimz Woolvett	Nominated	
Gemini Awards	November 7, 1999	Best Supporting Actress in a Dramatic Program or Miniseries	Sabrina Grdevich	Won	
Gemini Awards	November 7, 1999	Best Direction in a Dramatic Program or Miniseries	Stephen Williams	Won	
Gemini Awards	November 7, 1999	Best Writing in a Dramatic Program or Miniseries	Keith Ross Leckie, Alan Di Fiore	Nominated	
Gemini Awards	November 7, 1999	Best Picture Editing in a Dramatic Program or Series	Ralph Brunjes	Won	
