= Leah Pinsent =

Canadian actress

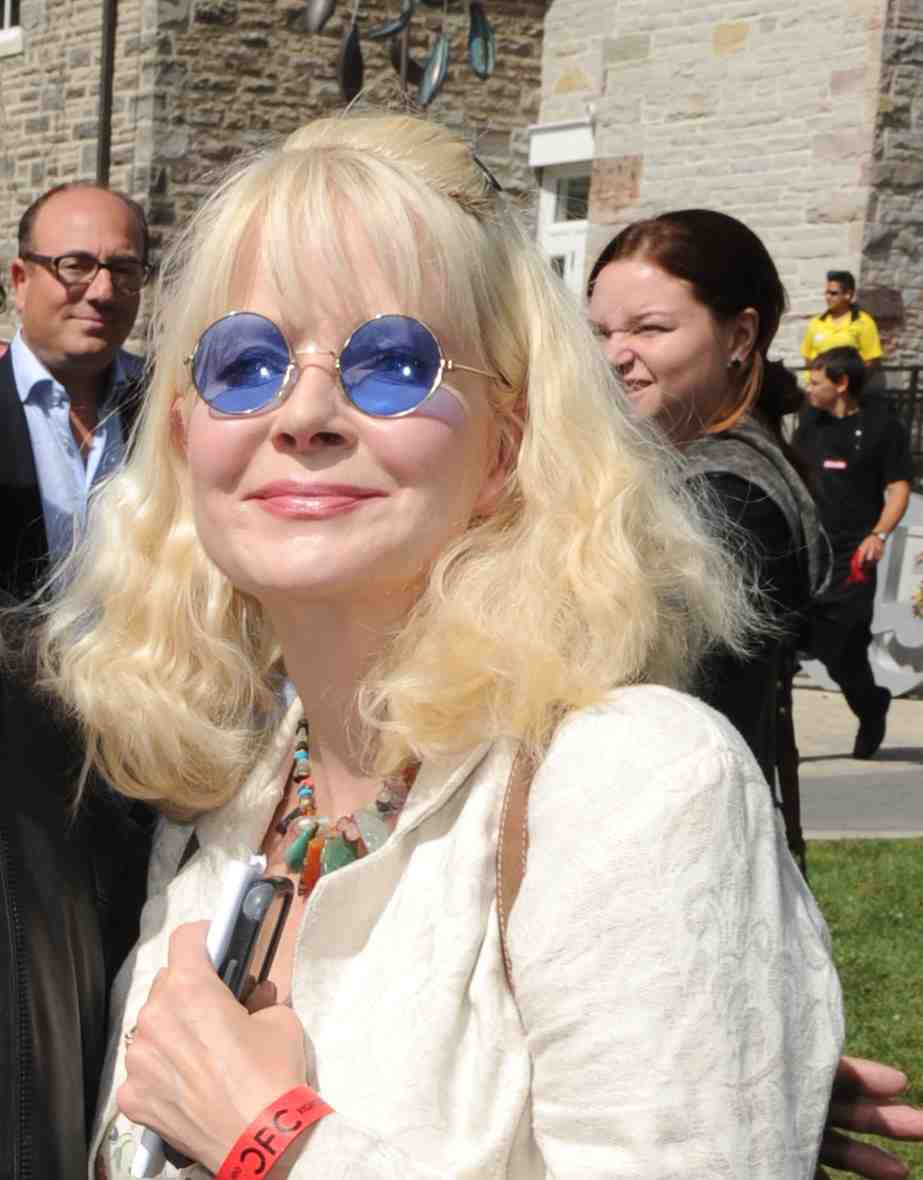
- Pinsent in 2013
- Born: September 20, 1968 (age 56)
- Years active: 1984 – present
- Spouse: Peter Keleghan
- Awards: Best Ensemble – Comedy Series; 2001 Made in Canada; 2002 Made in Canada; 2004 Made in Canada

Leah Pinsent (born September 20, 1968) is a Canadian television and film actress.

== Career ==
Pinsent made her film debut in 1984's The Bay Boy, best known as Kiefer Sutherland's first film. The role garnered her a Genie nomination for Best Supporting Actress. Her next role was in the 1986 horror film April Fool's Day alongside Thomas F. Wilson and Griffin O'Neal.

She is perhaps best known for her television roles as production accountant Veronica Miller in the comedy-drama series Made in Canada, and news anchor Diane Gordon in More Tears and Escape from the Newsroom.

== Personal life ==
Pinsent was born in Ontario, to Canadian actors Gordon Pinsent and Charmion King. She was married to Michael Capellupo from 1991 to 2002. Pinsent is married to actor Peter Keleghan.

== Filmography ==
=== Film ===
Year	Title	Role	Notes
1984	The Bay Boy	Saxon Coldwell	Nominated - Genie Award for Performance by an Actress in a Supporting Role
1986	April Fool's Day	Nan	
1990	Brutal Glory	Julia Woodruff	Video
1996	Dick Richards	Actress at Starbucks	Short film
1996	Virus	Larraine Keller	
2000	Waking the Dead	Reporter from Fielding's Past	
2002	A Promise	Emily	Short film
2006	1st Bite	Rose	
2008	Eating Buccaneers	Vanessa	Nominated - Canadian Comedy Award for Best Performance by a Female - Film
2011	The Bend	Mrs. Campbell	
2014	Big News from Grand Rock	Jane Davis	
2014	Wet Bum	Mary Ellen	

=== Television ===
Year	Title	Role	Notes
1988	Shades of Love: The Emerald Tear	Jayne Manley	TV movie
1988	Glory Enough for All		TV movie
1990	The Little Kidnappers	Kirsten MacKenzie	TV movie Nominated - Gemini Award for Best Performance by an Actress in a Supporting Role
1991	Haute tension	Amy	Episode: "Frontière du crime"
1991	Tropical Heat	Karen Getwell	Episode: "This Year's Model"
1992	Beyond Reality	Jennifer	Episode: "Master of Darkness"
1992	Murder, She Wrote	Louise Thayer	Episode: "Murder in Milan"
1994	Side Effects	Dr. Samantha Budd	Episode: "The Last Rights"
1997	Lies He Told		TV movie
1997	Psi Factor: Chronicles of the Paranormal	Olivia Vega	Episode: "The 13th Floor/The Believer"
1998	More Tears	Diane	
1998	Made in Canada	Veronica	65 episodes Nominated - Gemini Award for Best Performance in a Comedy Program or Series (1999); Won - Gemini Award for Best Ensemble Performance in a Comedy Program or Series (2001); Won - Gemini Award for Best Ensemble Performance in a Comedy Program or Series (2002); Nominated - Gemini Award for Best Ensemble Performance in a Comedy Program or Series (2003); Won - Gemini Award for Best Ensemble Performance in a Comedy Program or Series (2004)
1999	Win, Again!	Julie	TV movie Nominated - Gemini Award for Best Performance by an Actress in a Featured Supporting Role in a Dramatic Program or Miniseries
2000	20:13 – Thou Shalt Not Kill	Eve	TV movie
2001	All Souls	Dr. Elizabeth Baines	Episode: "One Step Closer to Roger"
2001	Rough Air: Danger on Flight 534	Air Traffic Controller Sara Lundattir	TV movie
2002	Escape from the Newsroom	Diane	TV movie
2005	Funpak	Jenny Florence	
2005	This Is Wonderland	Brooke Ryder	Episode: "2.12"
2005	Our Fathers	Marge Magnus	TV movie
2005	Burnt Toast	Julie	TV movie
2006	Heyday!	Movie Queen	TV movie
2006	Puppets Who Kill	Muffy	Episode: "The Hostage"
2007	Grossology	Emily (voice)	Episode: "Vein Drain"
2007	ReGenesis	Dr. Ann Turnbull	5 episodes
2010	Love Letters	Melissa	TV movie
2010	Republic of Doyle	Det. Sheila Lang	Episode: "The One Who Got Away"
2011	18 to Life	Serena Manson	Episode: "Sleepless in the Attic"
2011, 2021 & 2024	Murdoch Mysteries	Mrs. Irvin & Laura Söllner / Deborah Anderson	Episodes: "Bloodlust", "Murdoch Knows Best" & "The Fantastic Mr. Fawkes"
2012	Sunshine Sketches of a Little Town	Miss Cleghorn	TV movie
