= Sarrazin Couture Entertainment =

Film and television production company

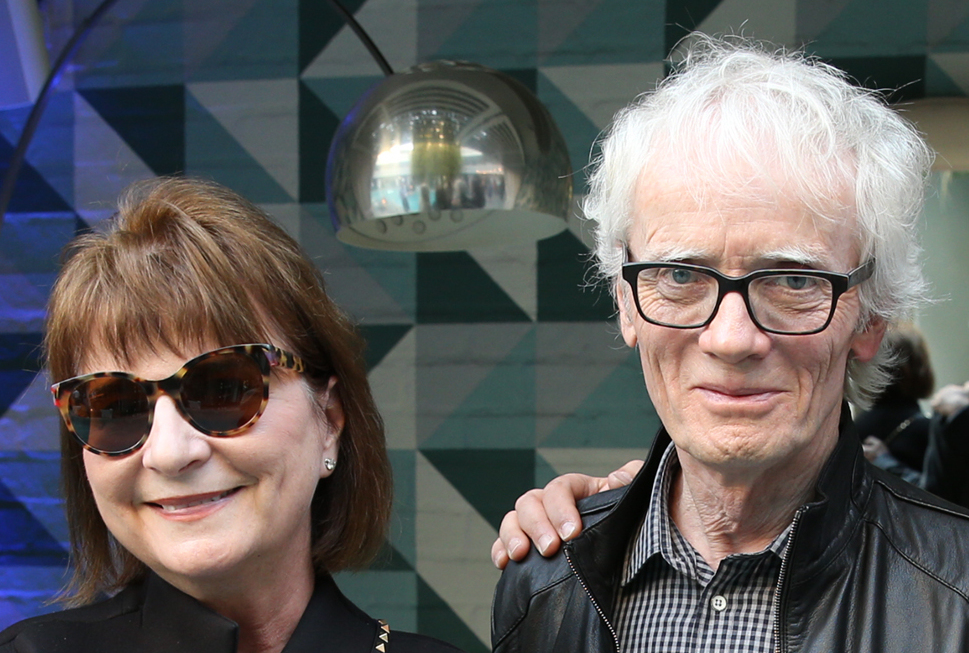
Suzette Couture and Pierre Sarazin at a CFC event in L.A.

Sarrazin Couture Entertainment is a motion picture and television production company founded by Pierre Sarrazin and Suzette Couture, based in Toronto, Ontario, Canada.

== Sarrazin Couture productions ==
- Stay with Me, a series pilot for the CTV Television Network about an at-home mother turned lawyer, who uses her wit and maternal intuition to find justice for her clients while navigating the shark-infested waters of the law and trying to raise two daughters.
- Doomstown, a portrayal of the devastating drug and gun-fueled gang wars in Toronto. Winner of the 2007 Gemini Award for Best TV Movie.
- The Man Who Lost Himself, depicting CFL Hall of Famer Terry Evanshen who lost all memory of his previous life in a horrific car crash
- The Life, chronicling two dedicated beat cops’ bold experiment to change lives of addicts on Vancouver's Downtown Eastside
- After the Harvest, starring Sam Shepard, based on the novel Wild Geese by Martha Ostenso
- The Sheldon Kennedy Story
- The City
- La Florida, winner of the Golden Reel Award (Canada).
