= Brian Linehan =

Canadian television host (1944–2004)

- Born: September 3, 1944; Hamilton, Ontario, Canada
- Died: June 4, 2004 (aged 59); Toronto, Ontario, Canada
- Occupation: television interviewer
- Known for: City Lights

Brian Richard Linehan (September 3, 1944 – June 4, 2004) was a Canadian television host from Hamilton, Ontario, best known for his celebrity interviews on the longrunning talk show City Lights.

== Background ==
Linehan was born in Hamilton, Ontario in 1944, one of seven children. His estranged Irish father, Les, worked at one of the local steel mills, Dofasco; and his Serbian mother, Sava (née Kotur), was later remarried to a post-World War II Serbian immigrant, Jovan Rodic Sr. He too, was a steel worker.

At age 19, Linehan moved to Toronto, taking an entry-level job with Odeon Cinemas. The following year, he began working in public relations as an organizer of celebrity promotional visits to Toronto. By 1968, he was the general manager of Janus Films, a film distribution company.

== Career ==
He joined Citytv in 1973 as the host of City Lights, a program which would eventually become syndicated throughout Canada and the United States. Linehan was renowned for his composure, interview skills and meticulous research, often leading to in-depth questions that could last for minutes. His guests often responded to his questions with astonishment at his depth of knowledge; actress Shirley MacLaine once commented that the stars flocked to Toronto "so Brian could tell us about our lives". His interviewing style was parodied on SCTV by Martin Short as "Brock Linahan", a character whose seemingly meticulous interview research—unlike Brian Linehan's—almost always turned out to be totally, utterly wrong.

In 1988, City Lights was rebooted as MovieTelevision, an expanded magazine series on film which Linehan cohosted with Jeanne Beker. Linehan was not happy with the new format, however, as it left him with far less time to conduct in-depth interviews, and left the show in 1989 after its first season. He took some time off, and then spent the early 1990s as a freelance publicity interviewer.

From 1996 to 1998, he hosted a second show entitled Linehan, which was produced for CHCH-TV in Hamilton. In 1999, Linehan won a Gemini Award as Best Host in a Lifestyle or Performing Arts Program for his work on the show. After that show ended, he taught a television production course at Toronto's Humber College.

Beginning in 2000, the original City Lights shows were reaired on the new Canadian cable channel Talk TV.

Linehan was also a longtime entertainment reporter on CFRB radio, and a frequent host of awards ceremonies such as the Genie Awards and the Geminis.

== Personal life ==
Linehan, who was gay, met Zane Wagman, a dentist, in the late 1960s. Through the 1970s, the couple also had a sideline business renovating and reselling houses. They remained together until Wagman's death by suicide in 2002; however, Linehan was very guarded about his personal life, acknowledging only to his closest friends and never publicly that Wagman was anything more than a platonic roommate.

Linehan was diagnosed with non-Hodgkin's lymphoma in 2001 and died in 2004. His ashes were scattered outside the Toronto home he had shared with Wagman, although Joan Rivers kept a small portion of them as a memento of him.

== Legacy ==
He left his estate to The Brian Linehan Charitable Foundation, which attempts to raise the profile of Canadian talent and supports the creation of a Canadian star system. The foundation's noted donations have included $1 million toward the creation of an actors' training program at the Canadian Film Centre, and $1 million to the Toronto International Film Festival toward the construction of the TIFF Bell Lightbox.

The public reading room at TIFF's Film Reference Library is named in honour of Linehan. The library also holds many of his personal archives and research collections.

George Anthony, a longtime friend of Linehan's, published the biography Starring Brian Linehan: A Life Behind the Scenes in 2008.
