= The City (1999 TV series) =

- Created by: Pierre Sarrazin; Suzette Couture
- Starring: Torri Higginson; John Ralston
- Country of origin: Canada
- No. of seasons: 2
- No. of episodes: 33

Production
- Running time: 60 minutes

Original release
- Network: CTV
- Release: March 7, 1999 – June 23, 2000

The City is a Canadian television drama series, created by Pierre Sarrazin and Suzette Couture, which aired on CTV from 1999 to 2000.

Set in Toronto, the series starred Torri Higginson as Katharine Strachan Berg, a society wife who gave up her career in law after marrying wealthy real estate developer Jack Berg (John Ralston). When her son Strachan (Matt Lemche) is injured in a shooting in the debut episode, she becomes motivated to return to public life by running for a seat on Toronto City Council, thus drawing her into contact with a diverse ensemble of characters representing many different aspects of the big city beyond the confines of her privileged and affluent Rosedale life. In the show's second season, she has been elected to a council seat, and must navigate the internal workings of Toronto City Hall to advocate for change while also dealing with the breakdown of her marriage.

The series was essentially a prime time soap opera, although Sarrazin rejected that label because of its association with unrealistic and melodramatic plots, and instead compared the show's intentions to socially realistic antecedents such as The Bonfire of the Vanities, Upstairs, Downstairs and the novels of Victor Hugo.

The shooting of Strachan in the pilot was based on the real Just Desserts shooting of 1994.

The series premiered in March 1999 with a 13-episode first season, and then returned in November 1999 with a 20-episode second season. It was not renewed for a third season.

== Awards ==
The show received three Gemini Award nominations at the 14th Gemini Awards in 1999, for Best Supporting Actor in a Drama Series (Shawn Doyle, Michael Sarrazin) and Best Guest Actor in a Drama Series (Jan Rubeš). It won three awards at the 15th Gemini Awards in 2000, for Best Actress in a Drama Series (Higginson), Best Supporting Actress in a Drama Series (Shannon Lawson) and Best Guest Actor in a Drama Series (Geordie Johnson); it was also nominated, but did not win, for Best Guest Actress in a Drama Series (Sheila McCarthy) and Best Direction in a Drama Series (Jerry Ciccoritti).

== Cast ==
- Torri Higginson as Katharine Strachan Berg, a Rosedale lawyer
- John Ralston as Jack Berg
- Shannon Lawson as Marly Lamarr
- Jody Racicot as St. Crispin St. James
- Matt Lemche as Strachan Berg
- Michael Sarrazin as Milt
- Madhuri Bhatia as Mrs. Socialist
- Aidan Devine as Father Shane Devlin
- Robin Brûlé as Angie Hart
- Shawn Doyle as Det. McKeigan
- James Gallanders as Det. Croft
- Arnold Pinnock as Tyrone Meeks
- Noam Jenkins as Lance
- Lorne Cardinal as Gabriel
- Enuka Okuma as Kira

Mel Lastman, the real-life Mayor of Toronto at the time the series aired, made a cameo appearance in the second season as himself, and Toronto radio host "Humble" Howard Glassman was heard in numerous episodes as a radio personality voicing public commentary on events.

== Episodes ==
=== Season 1 (1999) ===
No. overall	Title	Directed by	Written by	Original release date
1	"Joy Ride, Part 1"	Richard J. Lewis	Suzette Couture, Pierre Sarrazin	March 7, 1999
2	"Joy Ride, Part 2"	Richard J. Lewis	Suzette Couture, Pierre Sarrazin	March 7, 1999
3	"Fire in the Garden"	Randy Bradshaw	David Young	March 9, 1999
4	"Confessions"	Randy Bradshaw	Maureen McKeon	March 16, 1999
5	"Haunted"	Stephen Williams	Deborah Nathan	March 23, 1999
6	"Departures"	Allan King	David Young	March 30, 1999
7	"Surviving"	Allan King	Karen Walton	April 6, 1999
8	"Obsessions"	John L'Ecuyer	Jeremy Hole	April 13, 1999
9	"Shadows"	John L'Ecuyer	Deborah Nathan	April 20, 1999
10	"Blood Sports"	Bruce Pittman	Karen Walton	April 27, 1999
11	"Thicker Than Water"	Bruce Pittman	David Young	May 4, 1999
12	"Deranged Marriages"	Stephen Williams	Karen Walton	May 11, 1999
13	"It's Cold Out There"	Stephen Williams	Suzette Couture	May 18, 1999

=== Season 2 (1999–2000) ===
No. overall	No. in season	Title	Directed by	Written by	Original release date
14	1	"Where the Bodies Are Buried"	Steve DiMarco	Tom Sheridan	November 26, 1999
15	2	"Town Without Pity"	Jerry Ciccoritti	Tom Sheridan	December 3, 1999
16	3	"Means to an End"	Allan King	Maureen McKeon	December 10, 1999
17	4	"Dark Horses"	Jerry Ciccoritti	Karen Walton	December 17, 1999
18	5	"Point Counterpoint"	Clark Johnson	Jeremy Hole	January 14, 2000
19	6	"Gorky Parkette"	Bruce McDonald	Tom Sheridan	January 21, 2000
20	7	"Out of the Box"	Unknown	Unknown	February 11, 2000
21	8	"The Good, the Bad and the Broke"	Unknown	Unknown	March 3, 2000
22	9	"Hungry Hearts"	Michael Kennedy	Suzette Couture	March 17, 2000
23	10	"Survival of the Fittest"	Milan Cheylov	Deborah Nathan	March 24, 2000
24	11	"Bed Fellows"	Unknown	Unknown	April 14, 2000
25	12	"My Brother's Keeper"	Unknown	Unknown	April 24, 2000
26	13	"Motivation"	Holly Dale	Jeremy Hole	April 28, 2000
27	14	"Free Fall"	Milan Cheylov	David Young	May 5, 2000
28	15	"Swing Your Partner"	John L'Ecuyer	Graeme Manson	May 12, 2000
29	16	"Points of Light"	Jerry Ciccoritti	Deborah Nathan	May 26, 2000
30	17	"Blindside!"	John L'Ecuyer	Ann MacNaughton	June 2, 2000
31	18	"Just Like Honey"	Bruce McDonald	Karen Walton	June 9, 2000
32	19	"Sweet Cherub, Part 1"	John L'Ecuyer	Jeremy Hole	June 23, 2000
33	20	"Sweet Cherub, Part 2"	Steve DiMarco	Graeme Manson, Karen Walton	June 23, 2000
