= Incredible Story Studios =

Canadian television series (1997–2002)

- Created by: Robert De Lint; Virginia Thompson
- Presented by: Camille Devine
- Country of origin: Canada
- Original language: English
- No. of seasons: 5

Production
- Production locations: Regina, Saskatchewan, Canada
- Production company: Minds Eye Entertainment

Original release
- Network: YTV
- Release: 1 September 1997 – 8 March 2002

Incredible Story Studios (formerly Incredible Story Studio) is a Canadian television series which aired on YTV from 1997 to 2002. The program would receive stories written by children and make a TV episode segment of the series based entirely on the written story, but only when they graded it "INCREDIBLE" (according to the show's opening sequence). The show featured two stories per episode and the beginning of each story briefly showed the author demonstrating their writing.

The episode "Hitting Them" was the launching pad for Canadian kid group Six Degrees of Bacon. It included the song "No Tattoos" and an accompanying music video.

The series was broadcast on Discovery Kids in the United States, and was also seen in Latin America as Mi guión en Discovery Kids (My Script on Discovery Kids). The show is no longer on air but its DVDs were published and distributed by Digiview Productions.

In 2000 the series won a Gemini Award for Best Children's or Youth Program or Series.
