= Garwin Sanford =

Canadian film and television actor

- Born: Truro, Nova Scotia, Canada
- Occupation: Actor
- Years active: 1984–present

Garwin Sanford is a Canadian film and television actor known for his roles on Stargate SG-1 and Stargate Atlantis.

== Career ==
Sanford's most notable roles are Narim in Stargate SG-1 and Simon Wallace in Stargate Atlantis. In 1994, he played Captain Taylor Shields in the historical adventure series Hawkeye. Sanford has also made guest appearances on such television series as Smallville, Airwolf, North of 60, MacGyver, Stingray, Booker, Sliders, Dead Man's Gun, Highlander: The Series, Merlin's Apprentice, The Odyssey, The Outer Limits, Earth: Final Conflict, Dark Angel, The 4400, Eureka, So Weird and Supernatural. He appeared in Another Cinderella Story as Rod Parker, Joey's father. He has also appeared in several Bryan Adams music videos.

In 2005 Sanford appeared in Recipe for a Perfect Christmas (aka Smothered) as Clay McNeil, JJ's Boss. The following year Sanford appeared in Merlin's Apprentice as Lord Weston.

In 2013, Sanford appeared as the Red King in Once Upon a Time in Wonderland and as Vice President Brubaker in Independence Daysaster. Sanford has also had guest roles on Cedar Cove as Colin McFadden and When Calls the Heart as William Thatcher.

Sanford is also an artist, specializing in pen and ink portraiture and sculpture.

In 2015 Sanford was the recipient of the Sam Payne Award, an award given to a B.C. artist who demonstrates humanity, integrity and the encouragement of new talent.

== Filmography ==
Below is an incomplete filmography:

Year	Title	Role	Notes
1987	Airwolf	Nikolai Arkov	3 episodes
1988	MacGyver	Rafael / Durst	2 episodes
1989–1990	Booker	Haberman / Dehavelen Smith	4 episodes
1989	Who's Harry Crumb	Dennis Kimball	
1990	The Death of the Incredible Hulk	Agent Shoup	TV movie
1993–1994	North of 60	David Shore	4 episodes
1994–1995	Hawkeye	Captain Taylor Shields	21 episodes
1994	Highlander: The Series	John Garrick	Episode: "Shadows"
1994	The Odyssey	Arthur Bourne / Iceface	8 episodes
1995	Sliders	Doc	Episode: "Pilot"
1996–2001	The Outer Limits	Peter Chandler / Dom Pardo / Senator Meade	3 episodes
1997	Viper	Michael Cornell (Alex Broady)	SE3/EP3
1997–1998	Dead Man's Gun	Leyland Pringle / Frank Murphy	2 episodes
1998–2006	Stargate SG-1	Narim	3 episodes
1999	So Weird	Tad Raxall	2 episodes
1999	Milgaard	Hersh Wolch	Gemini Award nominee for Best Supporting Actor in a Television Film
2000	Life-Size	Richie Ackerman	TV film
2000–2001	Earth: Final Conflict	Federov	3 episodes
2001	Smallville	Mr. Brooks	Episode: "Red"
2002	Dark Angel	Head Priest	Episode: "Exposure"
2004–2005	Stargate Atlantis	Simon Wallis	3 episodes
2004	The 4400	Adam Kensington	2 episodes
2005	Recipe for a Perfect Christmas	Clay McNeil	TV film
2006–2007	Eureka	Congressman Faraday	2 episodes
2006	Merlin's Apprentice	Lord Weston	2 episodes
2007	Termination Point	Quinn	TV film
2007–2011	Supernatural	Jim Michael / Deacon	2 episodes
2008	Another Cinderella Story	Rod Parker	Direct-to-video
2013	Once Upon a Time in Wonderland	Red King	Episode: "Heart to Stone"
2013	Independence Daysaster	Dennis Brubaker	TV film
2014	Cedar Cove	Colin McFadden	3 episodes
2015–2018	When Calls the Heart	William Thatcher	9 episodes
