= Gordon Pinsent =

Canadian actor (1930–2023)

Gordon Pinsent CC FRSC
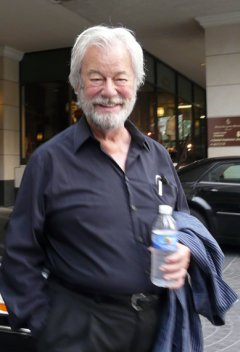
- Pinsent in 2008
- Born: Gordon Edward Pinsent; July 12, 1930; Grand Falls, Newfoundland, Canada
- Died: February 25, 2023 (aged 92); Toronto, Ontario, Canada
- Occupation: Actor
- Years active: 1957–2021
- Spouse: Charmion King (m. 1962; died 2007)
- Children: 4, including Leah Pinsent

Gordon Edward Pinsent CC FRSC (July 12, 1930 – February 25, 2023) was a Canadian actor. He was known for his roles in numerous productions, including Away from Her, The Rowdyman, John and the Missus, A Gift to Last, Due South, The Red Green Show, and Quentin Durgens, M.P. He was the voice of King Babar in the Babar the Elephant television and film productions from 1989 to 2015.

== Early life ==
Pinsent, the youngest of six children, was born in Grand Falls, Dominion of Newfoundland. His mother, Florence "Flossie" (née Cooper), was originally from Clifton, Newfoundland and his father, Stephen Arthur Pinsent, was a papermill worker and cobbler originally from Dildo, Newfoundland. His mother was "quiet spoken" and a religious Anglican; the family was descended from immigrants from Kent and Devon in England. He was a self-described "awkward child" who suffered from rickets.

Pinsent began acting on stage in the 1940s at the age of 17. He soon took on roles in radio drama on the CBC, and later moved into television and film as well. In the early 1950s, he took a break from acting and joined the Canadian Army, serving for approximately four years as a private in the Royal Canadian Regiment.

== Career ==
Pinsent's professional acting career began in 1957 at Winnipeg's Theatre 77 (later known as the Royal Manitoba Theatre Centre) under the direction of John Hirsch. In the years that followed, he performed in many theatrical productions in Winnipeg, in Toronto at the Crest Theatre and at the Stratford Festival.

In the early 1960s, he appeared in Festival, Scarlett Hill and The Forest Rangers. He later became a staple of Canadian television with roles including the series Quentin Durgens, M.P., A Gift to Last (which he created), The Red Green Show, Due South, Wind at My Back, and Power Play.

Pinsent's film roles included The Thomas Crown Affair, The Rowdyman, Who Has Seen the Wind, John and the Missus, The Shipping News and Away from Her. He wrote the screenplays for The Rowdyman and John and the Missus. Perhaps his best known early film role was that of the president of the United States in the 1970 science fiction cult classic Colossus: The Forbin Project. His other plays include Easy Down Easy (1987) and Brass Rubbings (1989).

One of Pinsent's largest roles was playing the character of Hap Shaughnessy on The Red Green Show from 1991 to 2006. Hap was notorious for telling largely exaggerated stories about his past. He was frequently called out on his fabrications by his friend Red Green (played by Canadian comedian and show co-creator Steve Smith) or others.

His first memoir, By the Way, was published in 1992 by Stoddart Publishing. His second, Next (with George Anthony), was published in 2012 by McClelland and Stewart.

On March 8, 2007, it was publicly announced in Toronto, Ontario, Canada, that Pinsent had accepted the appointment of honorary chairman of the "Building for the Future" fundraising campaign for The Royal Canadian Regiment Museum.

During the 2008, 2010, and 2011 summer periods of CBC Radio One, Pinsent presented a radio documentary series called The Late Show featuring extended obituaries of notable Canadians whom the producers believed deserved attention.

Pinsent appeared in one of Canadian director Stephen Dunn's early short films titled Life Doesn't Frighten Me, which won various awards, including the CBC Short Film Face-Off, with a cash prize of C$30,000. The film also won awards at the Toronto Student Film Festival and the Tribeca Film Festival in 2013.

He had a guest starring role as Maurice Becker on the February 3, 2010, episode of Canadian television series Republic of Doyle. He was also a featured guest reader on Bookaboo.

He attained notoriety when a comedic segment of him reading dramatically from Justin Bieber's autobiography on This Hour Has 22 Minutes went viral on October 20, 2010.

== Personal life and death ==
Pinsent married actress Charmion King in 1962. They remained together until her death in 2007. Their daughter, Leah Pinsent, is also an actress. Pinsent also had two children, Barry and Beverley, from a previous marriage.

On February 25, 2023, Pinsent died at a hospital in Toronto at age 92, from complications of a cerebral hemorrhage.

== Awards ==
In 1979, he was made an officer of the Order of Canada and was promoted to Companion in 1998. In 2006, he was made a Fellow of the Royal Society of Canada. In 2007, it was announced that Pinsent would receive a star on Canada's Walk of Fame.

In 1997, he won the Earle Grey Award for lifetime achievement in television.

Pinsent received an LL.D from the University of Prince Edward Island in 1975, and honorary doctorates from Queen's University, Memorial University of Newfoundland, Lakehead University (2008) and the University of Windsor (2012).

Pinsent received a Governor General's Performing Arts Award in 2004, Canada's highest honour in the performing arts.

It was on July 12, 2005, in his hometown of Grand Falls-Windsor, and in honour of his 75th birthday, that the Arts & Culture Centre was renamed The Gordon Pinsent Centre for the Arts.

On September 25, 2008, at a "Newfoundland- and Labrador-Inspired Evening" at The Windsor Arms Hotel in Toronto, the Company Theatre presented Pinsent with the inaugural Gordon Pinsent Award of Excellence.

Pinsent received the Queen Elizabeth II Diamond Jubilee Medal in 2012.

Pinsent received acting and writing awards, which included five Gemini Awards, three Genie Awards, two ACTRA Awards, and a Dora Award.

== Filmography ==
=== Film ===
Year	Title	Role	Notes	Ref.
1964	Lydia	Thomas		
1966	Don't Forget to Wipe the Blood Off			
1968	The Thomas Crown Affair	Jamie McDonald		
1970	Colossus: The Forbin Project	The President		
1971	Chandler	John Melchior		
1972	The Rowdyman	Will Cole		
1972	Blacula	Lt. Jack Peters		
1974	Newman's Law	Jack Eastman		
1974	Only God Knows	Father John Hagan		
1975	The Heatwave Lasted Four Days	Cliff Reynolds		
1976	Blackwood	Narrator		
1977	Who Has Seen the Wind	Gerald O'Connal		
1980	Klondike Fever	Swiftwater Bill		
1981	The Devil at Your Heels	Narrator (voice)	Documentary	
1981	Silence of the North	John Frederickson		
1987	John and the Missus	John Munn		
1989	Babar: The Movie	King Babar (voice)		
1990	Blood Clan	Judge William McKay		
1997	Pippi Longstocking	Capt. Longstocking (voice)		
1997	Pale Saints	Gus		
2001	The Shipping News	Billy Pretty		
2003	Nothing	Man In Suit		
2004	The Good Shepherd	Cardinal Ledesna		
2004	Saint Ralph	Father Fitzpatrick		
2006	Away from Her	Grant Anderson		
2009	At Home by Myself...With You	Narrator (voice)		
2013	Sex After Kids	Dr. Keaton		
2013	The Grand Seduction	Simon		
2013	Big News from Grand Rock	Stan		
2016	Two Lovers and a Bear	Bear's Voice		
2017	The River of My Dreams	Self	Documentary	

==== Shorts ====
Year	Title	Role	Notes	Ref.
1974	Ocean Heritage	Narrator (voice)		
1984	The Castle of White Otter Lake	Narrator (voice)		
1985	Uncle T			
1999	The Old Man and the Sea	Old Man (voice)		
2002	A Promise	Stan		
2003	Snow on the Skeleton Key	Winslow Icarus		
2006	The Sparky Book	Goldfish		
2009	The Spine	Dan Rutherford (voice)		
2009	How Eunice Got Her Baby	Narrator (voice)		
2012	Life Doesn't Frighten Me	Francis Weary		
2012	Night Light	Benjamin		
2012	Flight of the Butterflies	Self / Dr. Fred Urquhart	Documentary	
2013	Nuts, Nothing and Nobody	(voice)		
2016	Martin's Hagge	Man on Sidewalk		
2019	Night Shoot	Branch		
2020	Age of Dysphoria	Fred		
2021	Back Home Again	Jack Rabbit (voice)		

=== Television ===
Gordon Pinsent television credits
Year	Title	Role	Notes	Ref.
1961–1966	Festival	(various)	6 episodes	
1963	Scarlett Hill	David Black	Regular cast	
1963–1965	The Forest Rangers	Sergeant Brian Scott	Regular cast	
1968–1969	Quentin Durgens, M.P.	Quentin Durgens	Main Character	
1970	Hogan's Heroes	Capt. Steiner	1 episode	
1970	Quarantined	Dr. Bud Bedford	ABC Movie of the Week	
1972	Banacek	John Weymouth	1 episode	
1973	Incident on a Dark Street	Joe – Mayor	TV movie	
1973	Cannon	Phillip Trask	1 episode	
1974	The Play's The Thing	Host		
1978–1979	A Gift to Last	Sgt. Edgar Sturgess	TV movie	
1979	The Suicide's Wife	Allan Crane	TV movie	
1980	Up at Ours	Unknown	TV miniseries	
1981	Escape from Iran: The Canadian Caper	Ambassador Ken Taylor	TV movie	
1982	The Life and Times of Edwin Alonzo Boyd	Edwin Alonzo Boyd	TV movie	
1983	Ready for Slaughter	Will Hackett	1 episode	
1984	A Case of Libel	Dennis Corcoran	TV movie	
1984	Seeing Things	Englander	1 episode	
1985	And Miles to Go	Jack Morrissey	TV movie	Star and writer
1988	Two Men	(director)	TV movie	
1989–1991	Babar	King Babar (voice)	Regular cast	
1989–1993	Street Legal	Harold Vickers	5 episodes	
1989	Friday the 13th: The Series	Desmond Williams	1 episode	
1991–2006	The Red Green Show	Hap Shaughnessy	Recurring cast	
1992	In the Eyes of the Stranger	Lt. Ted Burk	TV movie	
1992	Counterstrike	Col. Jack Devon	Episode: "Death SEAL"	
1993	Bonds of Love	Leon	TV movie	
1994–1999	Due South	Robert Fraser	Recurring seasons 1-2, Main 3-4	
1995	A Vow to Kill	Frank Waring	TV movie	
1997–2000	Wind at My Back	Leo McGinty	7 episodes	
1998, 2003	Made in Canada (The Industry)	Myron Kingswell / Walter Franklin, Sr.	2 episodes	
1998–2000	Power Play	Duff McArdle	26 episodes	
1999	Win, Again!	Win Morrissey	TV movie	
2001	Blind Terror	Martin Howell	TV movie	
2003	Hemingway vs Callaghan	Morley Callaghan	TV movie	
2003	Fallen Angel	Warren Wentworth	TV movie	
2004	H_{2}O: The Last Prime Minister	Michael Cameron	2 episodes	
2009	Corner Gas	Corky Dillems	1 episode	
2010	The Pillars of the Earth	Archbishop	TV miniseries	
2010–2012	Republic of Doyle	Maurice Becker	Recurring cast	
2010–2015	Babar and the Adventures of Badou	King Babar (voice)	Regular cast	
2012	Sunshine Sketches of a Little Town	Elder Stephen Leacock	TV movie	
2013	Satisfaction	Dr Faskin	1 episode	
2019	Private Eyes	Nevin Ainslie	1 episode	

== Discography ==
Discography of Pinsent:

- 2002: At the Rim of the Carol-Singing Sea (with The Newfoundland Symphony Youth Choir)
- 2010: Down and Out in Upalong (with Travis Good and Greg Keelor)
