= Jaimz Woolvett =

Canadian actor (born 1967)

- Born: April 14, 1967 (age 59); Hamilton, Ontario, Canada
- Occupation: Actor
- Years active: 1986–2008

James Woolvett (born April 14, 1967), better known as Jaimz Woolvett, is a Canadian actor. Woolvett's best known role was the Schofield Kid, a near-sighted aspiring gun-fighter in Clint Eastwood's Academy Award-winning Western Unforgiven (1992). He has a younger brother, Gordon Michael Woolvett, and a sister, Tammy Woolvett.

== Filmography ==
=== Film ===
Year	Title	Role	Notes
1991	Journey into Darkness: The Bruce Curtis Story		"Scott Franz"
1992	Unforgiven	"The Schofield Kid"	
1993	The Dark	Ed	
1995	Dead Presidents	Lieutenant Dugan	
1997	Rosewood	Deputy Earl	
1997	The Assistant	Ward Minogue	
1998	Reluctant Angel	Donald	
1998	Boogie Boy	Larry Storey	
1998	Sanctuary	Dominic Grace	
1999	Y2K	Vince	
1999	Rites of Passage	"Red" Tenney	
1999	Tail Lights Fade	Ben	
2000	The Guilty	Leo	
2000	Beautiful Joe	"Mouse"	
2000	The Stepdaughter	Buddy Conner	Video
2002	Global Heresy	Leo	
2002	Birdseye	"Fingers"	
2003	Power Play	Todd	
2005	The Lazarus Child	Nathan Greenwater	
2008	Winged Creatures	Swedish Cook	

=== Television ===
Year	Title	Role	Notes
1986	9B		TV film
1989	E.N.G.	Sean	Episode: "Forests of the Night"
1989	My Secret Identity	Jason	Episode: "Out of Control"
1989	War of the Worlds	Larry	Episode: "Terminal Rock"
1989	Street Legal	Chris Gray	Episode: "Home"
1990	C.B.C.'s Magic Hour	Tom	Episode: "The Prom"
1990	Neon Rider	Steve Forrest	Episode: "Running Man"
1990	CBS Schoolbreak Special	Jason	Episode: "Maggie's Secret"
1990	Dog House	Richie Underwood	Main role (26 episodes)
1991	Deadly Betrayal: The Bruce Curtis Story	Scott Franz	TV film
1993	White Fang	Matt Scott	Main role (26 episodes)
1994	Lonesome Dove: The Series	Captain Middleton	Episode: "Duty Bound"
1994	Road to Avonlea	Booth Elliot	Episodes: "Enter Prince Charming", "The Minister's Wife"
1994	Kung Fu: The Legend Continues	Tommy Ness	Episode: "The Gang of Three"
1995	Brothers' Destiny	Tully	TV film
1995	Marvel Super Heroes	Blackheart (voice)	Video game
1995	The Great Defender	Jimmy Dugan	Episode: "Def Poets Society"
1995	Hiroshima	George Caron	TV film
1996	The Pathfinder	Ensign Jasper Weston	TV film
1997	Marvel Super Heroes vs. Street Fighter	Blackheart (voice)	Video game
1997	La Femme Nikita	Eric	Episode: "Escape"
1998	Four Corners		TV series
1998	The Day Lincoln Was Shot	David Herold	TV film
1998	JAG	Corporal Daryl Wetzel	Episode: "Father's Day"
1999	Da Vinci's Inquest	Dean Resnick	Episodes: "The Hunt", "The Capture"
1999	The Crow: Stairway to Heaven	James Pearl	Episodes: "The People vs. Eric Draven", "Birds of a Feather"
1999	Milgaard	Ron Wilson	TV film
1999	Joan of Arc	Philip the Good	TV miniseries
2000	Marvel vs. Capcom 2: New Age of Heroes	Blackheart (voice)	Video game
2001	The Fugitive	Steve Dalkowski	Episode: "Past Perfect"
2001	JAG	Midshipman Phillip Spencer	Episode: "Mutiny"
2001	Going Back	Tex	TV film
2002	MDs	EMT #2	Episode: "Wing and a Prayer"
2003	Love Comes Softly	Wagon Train Scout	TV film
2003	Charmed	Tull	Episode: "Nymphs Just Wanna Have Fun"
2003	Red Water	Jerry Collins	TV film
2004	Helter Skelter	Gary Hinman	TV film
