= Due South characters =

Canadian drama series characters (1994–99)

Due South is a Canadian crime series with elements of comedy. The series was created by Paul Haggis, produced by Alliance Communications, and stars Paul Gross, David Marciano (seasons 1–2), Gordon Pinsent, Beau Starr, Catherine Bruhier, Camilla Scott, Ramona Milano, and later Callum Keith Rennie (seasons 3–4). It ran for 67 episodes over four seasons, from 1994 to 1999.

== Characters ==
=== Sergeant Robert Fraser ===
Sergeant Robert J. Fraser
- Due South character
- First appearance: Pilot
- Last appearance: Call of the Wild (pt 2)
- Portrayed by: Gordon Pinsent

In-universe information
- Gender: male
- Occupation: RCMP Officer
- Family: George and Martha Fraser (parents)
- Spouse: Caroline (née Pinsent)
- Children: Benton Fraser, Maggie Mackenzie

Robert J. Fraser, often called Bob Fraser and referred to as Fraser Sr. to distinguish from his son, is a fictional character in the television series Due South portrayed by Canadian actor Gordon Pinsent.

Robert Fraser was a sergeant of the Royal Canadian Mounted Police. Fraser Sr. was 57 years old in April 1994. The pilot episode of Due South focuses on Fraser Sr.'s murder and his son's attempt to solve the case. His last words before he was shot were; "You're going to shoot a Mountie? They'll hunt you to the end of the Earth!" Robert Fraser was betrayed by, and his murder orchestrated by Gerrard (Ken Pogue), his friend of some 30 years, who was highly ranked within the RCMP and involved with illegal activity, in-order to cover-up the truth about flaws in a dam.

Fraser Sr. was a legend in his lifetime. He had a strong sense of justice and believed in the letter of the law. He was known for his ability to track criminals, especially in the expanse of wilderness. For over 20-years, the name "Bob Fraser" was spoken with awe among the ranks of the RCMP. In his eulogy, it was said that he 'could track a ghost across sheer ice', and that a young officer would have to move fast and drive hard 'just to catch his shadow'. He was considered, by his colleagues, to be a mountie who embodied the spirit and traditions of the RCMP. A toast to Robert Fraser after his funeral said, "may he not give the angels a moment's peace". It's also said that his son "didn't fall far from the tree."

Fraser Sr. appears in later episodes, starting with The Gift of the Wheelman, as a ghost providing advice to his son, Benton. Fraser Sr. also features in the series in voice-overs of sections from his diaries. In "Asylum", in season 3, Bob tells his son the story where he helped a group of Inuit being forcefully relocated to establish a fictitious town, called Elsmare, and over the course of a year used their accumulated relocation cheques to hire a lawyer to fight and win their case against their relocation in court; Bob mentions that Elsmare, during that time, was listed as having the lowest crime rate in North America.

Bob Fraser was married to Caroline Fraser, (née Pinsent). He had two children, both of whom became Mounties: son Benton Fraser, and, after the death of his wife, daughter Maggie Mackenzie by his friend Ellan Mackenzie, a widow and trapper. The latter was only brought to light after his death (in the penultimate episode of the series). #Sergeant Buck Frobisher was one of his closest friends.

Fraser Sr. and his wife lived in an igloo for four months, where their son Benton was conceived. They also lived in Fort Nelson for a while and at "The Rat", near a strip mine. His final home was a log cabin in the Yukon. He built the cabin himself.

Fraser Sr.'s ghost at first only allowed himself to appear to his son but it was soon revealed he could make himself be seen by anybody he chose to. He allows best friend, Sergeant Buck Frobisher, to see him, but is surprised when Constable Maggie Mackenzie – who he did not yet know was his daughter – is able to first hear him, and soon see him as well. On two occasions he has allowed non-family/friends to see him: once to one of the men who was responsible for his death, and to a former friend was being attacked after he offered to turn in evidence against his former partners-in-crime. Fraser Sr. offered to give his former friend a hand up when he was pursued by a car trying to run him down. When Fraser Sr.'s former friend tried to grabbed Fraser Sr.'s hand, it passed right through. The former friend fell several stories. Although severely injured, the former friend survived. The second time that Fraser Sr. appeared to another person was to a criminal name Muldoon, whom Fraser Sr. had pursued and captured years before. But Muldoon escaped from prison and was pursued by Fraser Jr. and "Ray Vecchio" (name then being used by #Detective Stanley Kowalski). "Vecchio" did not see Fraser Sr. though. Fraser Sr. appears in time to stop Muldoon from escaping, with Muldoon surprised to see his old nemesis having heard Fraser Sr. had died. Muldoon was returned to prison, making no mention of seeing Fraser Sr.'s ghost because people would most likely not believe him.

=== Sergeant Buck Frobisher ===
Sergeant Duncan Frobisher
- Due South character
- First appearance: Manhunt
- Last appearance: Call of the Wild (pt 2)
- Created by: Paul Gross
- Portrayed by: Leslie Nielsen

In-universe information
- Nickname: Buck
- Gender: male
- Title: Sergeant
- Occupation: RCMP Officer
- Children: Julie Frobisher (daughter)
- Relatives: Patty (granddaughter)

Sergeant Duncan "Buck" Frobisher is a fictional character in the television series Due South. Portrayed by Leslie Nielsen, he appears in the episodes "Manhunt", "All The Queens's Horses", "Call of the Wild (pt 1)" and "Call of the Wild (pt 2)".

Frobisher is approximately 6 feet (180 cm) tall with grey hair and is in his late 50s or early 60s, and in season 3, in "Burning Down the House", Benton Fraser describes him as bearing an uncanny resemblance to "a certain famous Canadian comedian". He is one of #Sergeant Robert Fraser's closest friends; and like his best friend, Frobisher is a legendary sergeant in the Royal Canadian Mounted Police.

During their youth, Fraser and Frobisher were both in love with Caroline. Caroline ultimately chose Fraser after he made fancy shot over a rope bridge. Frobisher accepted his loss with grace. He would later get married and have one known child, Julia, who would have a daughter of her own, Patty.

In his first appearance, in "Manhunt", Frobisher appears to be going through a mid-life crisis; after a phone call from Geiger, one of the worst felons he had ever arrested, Frobisher flees to Chicago, running from both his pursuer, Geiger, and from his own legendary reputation. After being confronted on this by Benton Fraser, the son of his late best friend, Frobisher manages to bring in Geiger for a second time. When Geiger was taken in by the Chicago PD, Frobisher advised the Chicago police "first chance you get, shoot".

In later episodes, it is revealed that Frobisher can also see and talk to Fraser Sr.'s ghost, who first reveals himself to Frobisher in "All The Queens's Horses".

He also seems to take a lot of taxis as seen in "Manhunt". He can't drive motorcycles.

=== Detective Stanley Kowalski ===
Stanley Raymond Kowalski
- Due South character
- First appearance: Burning Down the House
- Last appearance: Call of the Wild (pt 2)
- Created by: Paul Haggis
- Portrayed by: Callum Keith Rennie

In-universe information
- Nickname: Ray
- Gender: Male
- Title: Detective Stanley Kowalski, Chicago Police Department
- Occupation: Police Officer
- Family: Damien Kowalski (father); Barbara Kowalski (mother)
- Spouse: Stella Kowalski (ex-wife)

Stanley Raymond Kowalski (aka "Ray Kowalski") is a fictional character in the television series Due South. He is a Polish-American detective with the Chicago Police Department, serving with the 27th Precinct. The character is portrayed by actor Callum Keith Rennie.

Kowalski's father was a fan of Marlon Brando, who played Stanley Kowalski in the 1951 film version of A Streetcar Named Desire, hence his name. Kowalski however prefers to go by his middle name, Ray. To add to the Streetcar connections, Kowalski's ex-wife – the Assistant States Attorney – is called Stella. They still care about each other, but broke up because he wanted kids and she didn't. Kowalski's family includes his parents Damian and Barbara, and a brother who is only referenced on the show's official webpage and never made an appearance on the show.

Kowalski was brought into the series at the start of Season 3. Detective Raymond Vecchio had suddenly been sent deep undercover with the mob in Las Vegas, and to protect Ray's identity Kowalski was brought in to impersonate him until the real Vecchio returned. This meant taking on Ray's friend and unofficial partner, Mountie Benton Fraser, who was on vacation at the time of the "switch" and returned to find Kowalski at Ray's desk claiming to be Ray Vecchio. After being let into the secret, Fraser and Kowalski became true friends and partners.

Kowalski's eyesight is not the best in the world, and he needs to put on his glasses in order to use a gun with any degree of effectiveness. He prefers not to wear his glasses because he doesn't like how he looks with them, but he is an excellent shot when he does wear them. Kowalski also likes to put the Canadian version of Smarties into his coffee and likes to dance, something he used to do with Stella. Since the divorce he has taken fancy to a few women, but nothing serious has really happened.

Kowalski owns a black Pontiac GTO that he and his father refurbished. In the episode "Easy Money", his father returns it to him and Kowalski now uses it as his car.

The series ends with Fraser and Kowalski embarking on a quest to find the Hand of Sir John Franklin.

=== Inspector Margaret Thatcher ===
Margaret Thatcher
- Due South character
- Thatcher in season 2
- First appearance: Vault
- Last appearance: Call of the Wild (pt 2)
- Portrayed by: Camilla Scott

In-universe information
- Nickname: Meg
- Gender: Female
- Occupation: RCMP Inspector
- Nationality: Canadian

Margaret Thatcher is a fictional character in the television series Due South. She is an inspector of the Royal Canadian Mounted Police who works in the American city of Chicago, Illinois. The character is portrayed by Canadian actress Camilla Scott.

Thatcher shares her name with the former British Prime Minister, but seems to prefer "Meg" to her full name. She transfers from Ottawa to the Canadian consulate in Chicago at the beginning of the second season. Following protocol, she inspects all of Constable Benton Fraser's files, resulting in a rather negative initial opinion of him. Throughout the season, Fraser is often called upon to retrieve her clothing from the dry cleaners, to drive her to various formal functions, and to perform other menial tasks better suited to an administrative assistant. Her love of city living clashes with Fraser's love for the Canadian wilderness, a difference she manages to accept only after several years and an impending transfer away from Chicago. Regardless, her mastery of vintage skills of the Force are undiminished for her preferences, such when she effortlessly communicates with Fraser using hand semaphore when they are in a hostage situation.

Thatcher eventually falls in love with Fraser and often becomes flustered in his presence. He reciprocates her feelings (usually expressed through the phrase, "Red suits you."), though he is never demonstrative until the events of "All the Queen's Horses". The two share a passionate kiss on top of a moving train filled with explosives before engaging a group of domestic terrorists. They kiss again in "Mountie on the Bounty, Part 2", though this is possibly a daydream. They kiss one last time in the series finale, "Call of the Wild, Part 2". However, the kiss was shown only in the original Canadian airing and has been cut out of subsequent airings and DVD releases. On one occasion, she asks him to help her adopt a child, though he misinterprets her request as one to father a child with her. They part ways at the end of the series, with Thatcher taking a post in the Canadian Security Intelligence Service. She is shown standing behind Saddam Hussein amongst other Iraqi military officers. In voiceover, Fraser implies that she has a hand in destabilizing Hussein's regime.

Thatcher hints that more than one male superior has propositioned her in the past, offering professional gain in exchange. She has always rejected these offers; she once bluntly rebuffed RCMP counsel Henri Cloutier, who called her his protégée ("We are the Eggmen").

=== Constable Renfield Turnbull ===
Constable Renfield Turnbull
- Due South character
- First appearance: A Bird in the Hand
- Last appearance: Call of the Wild (pt 2)
- Created by: Paul Gross
- Portrayed by: Dean McDermott

In-universe information
- Gender: Male
- Occupation: RCMP officer

Renfield Turnbull is a fictional character in the television series Due South. He is a constable of the Royal Canadian Mounted Police who works in the Canadian Consulate in the American city of Chicago, Illinois. The character is portrayed by Dean McDermott.

Constable Turnbull acts as comic relief and is a caricature of Constable Benton Fraser, the series' main character.

Turnbull is not clever and has a tendency to speak his mind. He is frequently seen doing office tasks and answering the phone. He also does guard duty outside the consulate. Turnbull models himself on Fraser, but only ever accomplishes a superficial likeness.

Turnbull enjoys country music. He likes drawing, painting and cooking, and is a curling fan. Turnbull is a monarchist. During the romance interlude in the episode "Mountie on the Bounty", Turnbull appears to proposition another male Mountie and they arm-wrestle while other characters kiss.

Fans have deduced from Turnbull's uniform that he is between 24 and 29 years old when he first appears in the programme.

It is revealed in the series finale that after leaving the RCMP, Turnbull ran for public office. Turnbull's campaign got off to a rocky start after he was run over by his campaign bus.

=== Detective Raymond Vecchio ===
Raymond Vecchio
- Due South character
- First appearance: Pilot
- Last appearance: Call of the Wild (pt 2)
- Created by: Paul Haggis
- Portrayed by: David Marciano

In-universe information
- Gender: Male
- Title: Detective First Grade
- Occupation: Police Detective
- Family: Carmine Vecchio (father, deceased); Mrs. Vecchio (mother); Francesca Vecchio (sister); Maria (sister)
- Spouse: Angie (divorced)
- Relatives: Tony (brother-in-law); Lorenzo (uncle); Al Grosso (cousin)
- Religion: Roman Catholic
- Nationality: American

Detective First Grade Raymond "Ray" Vecchio is a fictional character in the television series Due South. He is a detective with the Chicago Police Department, on the force for approximately 14 years by the end of the series, serving with the 27th Precinct. He lives at 2926 North Octavia Avenue, a Victorian-style house left to him by his father, in the Chicago suburb of Norwood Park. He frequently works with RCMP Constable Benton Fraser, deputy liaison officer of the Canadian consulate in Chicago, to get to the bottom of crimes; though aggravated by Fraser's unorthodox style (which contributes to the comic side of the show), he is usually satisfied with the results. Ray is portrayed by actor David Marciano.

==== Background ====
Ray was born and grew up in Chicago, raised as a Roman Catholic. He is the patriarch of a large family - including his mother, sister Francesca Vecchio (Ramona Milano, in a recurring (29 episodes) role), sister Maria and her husband Tony, many nieces and nephews and a brother who lives outside of Chicago. His father, with whom Ray had a strained relationship, died in 1989 and did not care for police officers, which might explain by way of rebellion why Ray became one. The senior Vecchio did, however, bequeath his house to Ray, although this is most likely by dint of Ray being his firstborn.

Sibling rivalry aside, Ray is very protective of Francesca and attempts to discourage her from pursuing a romance with the relatively unemotional Fraser. In episode 3.09, "Dead Guy Running", Francesca speaks of an incident in which Ray violently threatened an abusive man she was dating; when the man was found dead in the police station, Ray, undercover at the time, was suspected (but later cleared) of killing him.

Ray is a fan and occasional player of basketball, having played on his high-school basketball team; he refuses to believe Fraser's anecdote of the game's invention by a Canadian minister. His inability to skate contributes to his criticism of hockey, which he derides as "figure skating with clubs." On rarer occasion, he plays poker, either for actual gambling or simply to kill time.

Ray is divorced from ex-wife Angie (played by Marciano's real-life wife Katayoun Amini), and has been involved with a few women since, including a suspected arms smuggler who turned out to be an undercover ATF agent. Ray has had an antagonistic relationship since childhood with a neighborhood mafioso, Don Frank Zuko, and an on-and-off relationship with Zuko's sister, Irene (Carrie-Anne Moss). His best friend and de facto partner is a Canadian Mountie, Constable Benton Fraser, who is assigned to the Canadian Consulate in Chicago, and the two often help each other solve crimes and right wrongs in the city of Chicago (and, on rare occasion, in Canada itself).

Fraser is Ray's polar opposite in many ways - whereas the Mountie is polite, well-mannered, and obeys the law to the letter, Ray is loud, brash, and will often bend or break the rules to solve a case. Much of the comedy of the show is derived from their differences. The two also have much in common. Both care deeply about their communities, both had troubled relationships with their deceased fathers, and both can be highly tenacious investigators (once Ray can be motivated to become involved with a case) with a strong sense of justice. Ray habitually mispronounces his partner's name "Frazier" and often calls him "Benny."

Ray is obsessed with mint-condition green 1971 Buick Rivieras. He has currently owned at least three of them - the first was blown up during a gunfight to save Vecchio and Fraser's lives, the second was destroyed by a car bomb, and the third was also fitted with a bomb and was driven into Lake Michigan.

During the first season, Ray often wore loud, garish clothes and was criticised by his colleagues for his wardrobe. He did, however, wear tasteful suits as well (Fraser believed his name to be "Detective Armani" at their first meeting), and wears them much more frequently during the second season. He openly despairs that Fraser has caused a great many of them to be ruined by digging for clues in garbage and other filth.

Ray is unskilled with computers, preferring instead to use a typewriter (although he is a poor typist). He relies heavily on Civilian Aide Elaine Besbriss to do much of his research for him, and will occasionally have Fraser type for him. He also has a black book full of various officials he has blackmail information on, though most of it proves to be outdated and useless by the time he ever finds a reason to use it (often to help Fraser with a legal matter). He is acrophobic, and highly dismayed whenever Fraser jumps out of a window or from some other great height in pursuit of a suspect. In spite of all of that, and his large back-log of cases, he is a skilled and effective detective.

==== Career ====
Ray has been a Chicago police officer since at least 1985 and was still a beat cop in mid-1986. It is unclear when he was bumped up to detective; his first supervisor, Lieutenant William Kelly, thought enough of him to attend to his promotion. His present supervisor, Lieutenant Harding Welsh, is somewhat less enthusiastic, but nevertheless fair; he has shown great reluctance to take disciplinary action against Ray, and defended him before higher-ranking officers. Ray's relationship with his brother detectives, particularly Jack Huey and Louis Gardino, is at some times cordial and other times downright competitive and antagonistic.

In "The Promise" (#2.05), Ray mentions that he spent six years in the vice squad prior to his present stint in the violent crimes division. Before meeting Fraser, Ray worked mostly alone; "The Duel" (#2.16) was the only episode in which he encountered a former partner. Despite several references to the slow progress of Ray's career, he was promoted to detective first grade shortly before "Juliet Is Bleeding" (#2.07).

More than once, Ray has been severely injured in the line of duty. In all on-screen incidents, he voluntarily sustained such an injury acting as a human shield to Fraser. In the pilot movie, he pushed Fraser out of a window ahead of a bomb blast; took a bullet for him in "Letting Go" (#1.22); and took another, final bullet in "Call of the Wild: Part 1" (#4.12, see below). In "Victoria's Secret: Part 2" (#1.21), however, he accidentally shot Fraser in the back while attempting to prevent him from coming to harm by Fraser's femme fatale, Victoria Metcalf, with crippling results.

Ray has also been suspended from duty on occasion, though one such suspension was no fault of his own, and not ahead of his colleagues and supervisor going to bat for him. A curiosity of his on-screen suspensions is that Lt. Welsh did not relieve him of his service weapon along with his shield, normally necessary when removing a police officer from active service.

Ray had to suddenly leave Chicago at the start of the third season. It turned out he had an uncanny resemblance to Armando 'the Bookman' Langoustini, a Mob lieutenant in Las Vegas. After the Bookman died in a car crash, Ray was sent undercover to replace him. Episode 3.08 "Spy vs. Spy" hinted that Langoustini might have been discreetly murdered to allow Ray's insertion by federal officers. To protect his identity, Ray himself was impersonated by Detective Stanley Kowalski, who posed as Ray Vecchio for the next year until Vecchio's return in the series finale.

In the finale, Vecchio is shot during a protracted gunfight, and the bullet proves to be his "Golden Bullet", allowing him to retire. He moves to Florida with Detective Kowalski's ex-wife, an Assistant States Attorney named Stella.
