= Benton Fraser =

- Due South character
- Benton Fraser in Diefenbaker's Day Off
- First appearance: Pilot
- Last appearance: Call of the Wild part 2
- Created by: Paul Haggis
- Portrayed by: Paul Gross

In-universe information
- Nicknames: Benny; Ben; Bento; Fraser Jr.
- Gender: Male
- Title(s): Constable Benton Fraser, RCMP
- Occupation: Royal Canadian Mounted Police Officer (RCMP)
- Family: Bob Fraser (father); Caroline Pinsent Fraser (mother); Maggie Mackenzie (half-sister)

Benton Fraser (born 1962) is a fictional character and the protagonist of the television series Due South. He is a constable of the Royal Canadian Mounted Police who works in the American city of Chicago, Illinois as Deputy Liaison Officer in the Canadian consulate. He lives in a dangerous neighbourhood at the fictional address of apartment 3J at 221 East Racine, and later at the consulate itself, after his apartment building was burnt down. The character is portrayed by Canadian actor Paul Gross. Fraser's seemingly strange habits, such as tasting evidence, his insistence in wearing old style RCMP uniforms, which drifts to wearing the ceremonial Red Serge uniform on regular duty, and a rigid sense of duty and courtesy, such as holding the door for anyone and everyone, add hilarity and whimsy to the show.

As Fraser often explains: "I first came to Chicago on the trail of the killers of my father, and for reasons that don't need exploring at this juncture I have remained, attached as liaison with the Canadian Consulate". Fraser is a strait-laced Canadian, and his faith in the honour and goodness of others tends to lead to interesting and humorous moments. Described as an "outdoors Sherlock Holmes". his behaviour often leads to the frustration of his de facto partner, Chicago detective Raymond Vecchio, played by David Marciano. His other "best friend," a deaf half-wolf, Diefenbaker, named after Canadian Prime Minister John Diefenbaker, reads lips in both English and Inuktitut, and often assists in the capture of criminals. In the third and fourth seasons of the show, Fraser teamed up with Detective Stanley Raymond Kowalski, after Ray Vecchio went undercover in the Las Vegas Mafia.

He is usually called "Fraser" by his friends and colleagues - some old friends will call him Benton or Ben at times. Ray calls him Benny or Fraser, (often mispronouncing it "Frasier").

== Character ==
Benton Fraser was conceived in an igloo, (according to his father), and was born out in a field, and grew up in Inuvik, Northwest Territories; and Tuktoyaktuk, Northwest Territories. After his mother was killed when he was still young, Benton was raised by his paternal grandparents, who were traveling librarians. His mother, Caroline, was killed when he was an 8-year-old boy, and his father, Bob Fraser, (played by Canadian actor Gordon Pinsent), was murdered in the pilot episode, at this point, Benton had been with the RCMP for 13 years. Bob, or "Fraser Sr.," as he is sometimes known, was a legendarily effective officer in the RCMP and often appears to his son as a ghost throughout the series to offer help and advice. Other relatives include an Uncle Tiberius, (who died wrapped in Cabbage leaves, which the family assumes to have been a freak accident, first mentioned in "The Gift of the Wheelman" in season 1,) and an Aunt Winnie, (mentioned only in "Perfect Strangers", in season 3).

According to best friend, Ray Vecchio, in An Eye for a Eye, Benton's problem is that "if [he] sees a problem, [he's] gotta fix it, [he] can't even go to the mens room without stopping to tell some simple, stupid, charmingly-witty Inuit story, that inspires people to take on the world's social ills." In "The Blue Line", in season 1, it is revealed that Benton is a fan of Ice hockey, and that he used to play it as a child; and in "Asylum", in season 3, it is shown that Benton is also a fan of curling.

Fraser has had an unfortunate recurring relationship with Victoria Metcalf, a bank robber with whom he became infatuated after pursuing her into and then helping her survive a lengthy winter storm. After the storm was over, Fraser turned Victoria in to the authorities and she was sent to prison. This encounter is first outlined in episode 11 of series 1, "You must remember this"; during a stake-out Fraser comes the closest to 'baring his soul' before turning to find Vecchio asleep. That episode fades with Fraser looking at a slightly crumpled black-and-white photo of her. She later resurfaced in Chicago, blackmailing Fraser into helping her use the money from the bank robbery to buy jewels on the black market, threatening to have Ray Vecchio framed for corruption. She left Chicago soon by train after her plot failed and tried to have Fraser come with her, only for Ray, believing Victoria was holding a gun at Fraser to accidently shoot him when aiming at her. While Fraser recovered both physically and emotionally, Victoria, believing he had died, leaving her heartbroken was never seen again, her final fate being a matter of interpretation.

Having little experience with romantic matters, Fraser appears to have suppressed his emotions, often for comic effect in the series, and buried himself in the masculine pursuits of law enforcement and campcraft. His super-human detective abilities provide humorous contrast with his inability to interact with women. His fixation upon Victoria, and later, his superior officer, Margaret Thatcher, (no relation to the British prime minister), was unreasonable, and he may have used his attraction to an unavailable woman as a mechanism for avoiding change in his own life.

In the ITV documentary South Bound co-star David Marciano said it was vital that the character of Fraser be both innocent but also unemotional. Actor Daniel Kash, (Detective Louis Gardino in the series), in the same documentary observed about Fraser that 'You'll never see that character cry. You'll sense that he'll be crying inside but you'll never see tears going down his face. He's just too buffed for that, and too reserved.'

In the episode Bounty Hunter, Fraser meets a woman who seems very compatible with him, but his father warns Benton off. Fraser Sr tries to get his son to understand that the woman is not the one who is vulnerable, but Benton. For all of his son's physical self-reliance, the young constable needs emotional maturing.

Fraser eventually discovered he had a half-sister, Maggie MacKenzie, in the season four episode Hunting Season. Because Bob Fraser is her father, she can also see his ghost. Just like her father and half-brother, Maggie is a member of the RCMP. She arrived in Chicago pursuing the killers of her husband, under circumstances similar to Fraser's own arrival in the city, though she soon returned to Canada, unlike Fraser, who remained in Chicago for some time.

Fraser wears his uniform stetson hat both in uniform and out. When he loses it, he seems to get into trouble. Fans of the show have thus nicknamed it the Stetson of Invulnerability. Fraser carries his paper money inside his hat. He frequently only has Canadian currency with him as it is "regulation" to be paid in that currency.

Fraser's apartment is at 221 East Racine. The neighbourhood is dangerous, but Fraser liked the apartment for its close proximity to his workplace.

== Series finale ==
Fraser would eventually return to Canada and, along with Stanley Kowalski, set out on an adventure to find the hand of Sir John Franklin, an explorer who disappeared while trying to discover the Northwest Passage. (The soundtrack for that segment was Stan Rogers's song "Northwest Passage".) As the series ended with the beginning of their expedition, it is unknown what has happened to Fraser or Kowalski since then. His closing remarks: "If we find it...we'll let you know."

The ITV documentary, made nine years after the series ended, concludes with Paul Gross saying "We never did photograph it, but I can tell you that we, (Benton and Stanley,) found it."
