= List of Due South episodes =

This is a list of episodes for the television series Due South.

== Series overview ==
Series	Episodes	Originally released	
Series	Episodes	First released	Last released
Pilot		23 April 1994	
1	22	22 September 1994	1 June 1995
2	18	9 November 1995	19 September 1996
3	13	14 September 1997	22 March 1998
4	13	23 September 1998	14 March 1999

== Episodes ==
=== Pilot (1994) ===
No. overall	Title	Directed by	Written by	Original CAN. air date	Original U.K. air date
1	"Pilot"	Fred Gerber	Paul Haggis	23 April 1994	9 May 1995
When a Canadian Mountie (Gordon Pinsent) is killed, his son (Paul Gross) travels to Chicago to investigate the matter. He will discover a cover-up and solve what happened to his father. The police officer Ray Vecchio (David Marciano) is involved in the search. Featured music: "From a Million Miles" by Single Gun Theory, *"Superman's Song" by Crash Test Dummies

=== Season 1 (1994–95) ===
No. overall	No. in season	Title	Directed by	Written by	Original CAN. air date	Original U.K. air date
2	1	"Free Willie"	George Bloomfield	Kathy Slevin & Paul Haggis	22 September 1994	16 May 1995
Constable Fraser (Paul Gross) begins his new life in Chicago by moving into an apartment, and immediately apprehends a purse snatcher who is in possession of a gun used in a robbery. Fraser is convinced the boy was not involved in the crime and sets about helping him, placing Vecchio's job on the line while doing so. Featured music: "It's All Over" by The Headstones
3	2	"Diefenbaker's Day Off"	Joe Scanlan	Kathy Slevin	29 September 1994	23 May 1995
Fraser helps a little girl in his building whose father may be involved in an insurance scam, which is being investigated by a reporter. Featured music: "American Woman" by The Guess Who
4	3	"Manhunt"	Paul Lynch	Paul Haggis	6 October 1994	30 May 1995
Sergeant Buck Frobisher, a semi-recurring character played by Leslie Nielsen, Fraser Sr.'s best friend on the force, is on the run from an escaped felon, whom he helped put away. Geiger will stop at nothing to kill him, now Fraser and Ray must help Buck to hunt down the killer and bring him to justice once again.
5	4	"They Eat Horses, Don't They?"	Tim Bond	Stephen Neigher	13 October 1994	9 June 1995
Ray and Fraser visit a supermarket, where all isn't what it seems. Several cases of food poisoning, and Fraser's keen nose, leads him to believe that the ground beef may contain other meat than just cow meat. He joins forces with an animal rights activist (guest star Teri Polo) to prove this. Also featuring Al Waxman as a meatpacker and Richard Moll as a helpful stablehand. Featured music: "Uphill Battle" by Sarah McLachlan
6	5	"Pizzas and Promises"	George Bloomfield	David Shore	20 October 1994	16 June 1995
When Ray tries to scam a pizza company out of paying for his freshly ordered pizza, the recently parolled delivery boy's new car (with the infamous plate number RCW 139) is stolen. This leads to Ray and Fraser going under cover as used car salesmen to expose the owners' scam. Featuring Patrick McKenna as a used car salesman.
7	6	"Chinatown"	Lyndon Chubbuck	David Cole	26 October 1994	23 June 1995
Fraser and Ray go for a meal in Chinatown, when Fraser overhears a kidnapping. The person kidnapped is the restaurant owner's son, and the kidnapper is the local gang-lord. Things heat up when the FBI get involved in the case. Featured music: "Prospero's Speech" by Loreena McKennitt
8	7	"Chicago Holiday, Part 1"	Paul Lynch	Jeff King & Paul Haggis	10 November 1994	19 October 1996
Fraser's next task is to escort a Canadian Diplomat's daughter (guest star Lisa Jakub) to a ball, meanwhile, Ray is trying to track down a murdered mobster's contact list which has been stolen by a mysterious woman (guest star Stacy Haiduk). Little do they know, their tasks will soon merge. The Holly Cole Trio performs the Aaron Davis composition Neon Blue in a dinner club during credits at the beginning of the episode.
9	8	"Chicago Holiday, Part 2"	Lyndon Chubbuck	Jeff King & Paul Haggis	17 November 1994	19 October 1996
The Holly Cole Trio performs "Smile" during the ball at the end of the episode. Featured music: Que Sera, Sera by Holly Cole Trio
10	9	"A Cop, a Mountie and a Baby"	Steve DiMarco	Peter Colley & Kathy Slevin	1 December 1994	30 June 1995
A mother abandons her baby in Vecchio's car. Fraser and Vecchio find the child's home and return the child to its father (guest star Mark Ruffalo), unaware that the child is due to be adopted to pay off the father's gambling debts. They learn that the transaction is legal and had been agreed to by the mother, who was pressured to do so. When the father suffers a crisis of conscience and tries to cancel the deal, Fraser and Vecchio save him from being shot. Featured music: "Fear" by Sarah McLachlan, "Worlds Away" by The Northern Pikes
11	10	"The Gift of the Wheelman"	Jerry Ciccoritti	Paul Haggis	15 December 1994	7 July 1995
A gang of Santa Clauses hold up a bank, but when one of the criminals double-crosses his cohorts - Fraser is mystified about his intentions. Also a slightly unexpected visitor appears. Featuring Ryan Phillippe as the son of one of the bank robbers. Featured music: "Steaming" by Sarah McLachlan, "Henry Martin" and "Rumboldt" by Figgy Duff
12	11	"You Must Remember This"	David Warry-Smith	Peter Lefcourt	5 January 1995	14 July 1995
Ray falls in love with a woman who saved his life (guest star Susan Gibney), but later he realises that the woman is an arms dealer. Featured music: *"Why'd You Lie?" by Colin James
13	12	"A Hawk and a Handsaw"	David Shore	David Shore & Paul Haggis	19 January 1995	21 July 1995
Fraser gets himself admitted to a psychiatric hospital to investigate the death of a patient. Featured music: "Akua Tuta" by Kashtin
14	13	"An Eye For an Eye"	Steve DiMarco	Carla Kettner & Kathy Slevin & Jeff King	2 February 1995	3 October 1995
After an elderly man (guest star Carl Gordon) is attacked, a neighborhood watch group of senior citizens formed by Fraser starts to take their duties too seriously. Featured music: "Bone of Contention" by Spirit of the West, "Stain" by Salvador Dream, "Push" by Moist
15	14	"The Man Who Knew Too Little"	George Bloomfield	Frank Siracusa	9 February 1995	5 September 1995
Fraser and Ray are escorting a compulsive liar (special guest star Rino Romano) back to Canada to face charges of perjury. An organized crime family is in pursuit to silence this witness. Featured music: "Such Is the Situation" by The Sidemen
16	15	"The Wild Bunch"	Richard J. Lewis	Kathy Slevin & Jeff King	16 February 1995	12 September 1995
Diefenbaker begins acting strangely and Fraser thinks that he may be reverting to his wild ways.
17	16	"The Blue Line"	George Bloomfield	David Shore	8 March 1995	19 September 1995
Fraser's childhood friend (guest star Rick Rossovich), now a famous hockey player, receives death threats. Fraser agrees to protect the sports star. Featured music: The Hockey Theme by Dolores Claman
18	17	"The Deal"	George Mendeluk	Peter Lefcourt	30 March 1995	10 October 1995
A mafia boss and former schoolmate of Ray's, Frankie Zuko, insists that the police investigate the robbery of a church poor-box. Featured music: "Ela Mater" from Stabat Mater by Antonín Dvořák
19	18	"An Invitation to Romance"	George Bloomfield	Deborah Rennard & Paul Haggis	6 April 1995	7 November 1995
Fraser's delivery of a party invitation turns dangerous when he repeatedly encounters a woman (guest star Jane Krakowski) with a mobster boyfriend (guest star Nicholas Campbell). Featured music: "Sleeping Beauty waltz" by The Emperor Quartet
20	19	"Heaven and Earth"	David Warry-Smith	Phil Bedard, Larry Lalonde	24 April 1995	24 October 1995
A homeless man (guest star Jonathan Banks) who sees visions may be Ray and Fraser's only link to finding a missing girl. Featured music: "At the Hundredth Meridian" by The Tragically Hip
21A	20	"Victoria's Secret, Part 1"	Paul Haggis	Paul Haggis & David Shore	11 May 1995	14 November 1995
Victoria Metcalfe (special guest star Melina Kanakaredes), the only woman Fraser ever loved, turns up in Chicago. She was also a bank robber that Fraser had to arrest. She claims she's given up her criminal past, and that her former gang is coming after her. But Vecchio thinks Fraser is being blinded by love. Featured music: "Possession" by Sarah McLachlan, "O God, my God" by The Baha'i Chorale
21B	21	"Victoria's Secret, Part 2"	Paul Haggis	Paul Haggis & David Shore	11 May 1995	14 November 1995
Fraser's morals and friendships are put to the test as he gets drawn deeper into Victoria's web of lies and deceit. The climax ends in permanent heartbreak. Featured music: "Fumbling Towards Ecstasy" by Sarah McLachlan
22	22	"Letting Go"	George Bloomfield	Jeff King & Kathy Slevin	1 June 1995	28 November 1995
After being shot, Fraser is in hospital investigating a blackmail scheme (an homage to Alfred Hitchcock's Rear Window). Fraser is assisted in his investigation by his physiotherapist (guest star Laurie Holden). Featured music: "Plenty" by Sarah McLachlan

=== Season 2 (1995–96) ===
No. overall	No. in season	Title	Directed by	Written by	Original CAN. air date	Original U.K. air date
24	1	"North"	Richard J. Lewis	Jeff King	9 November 1995	27 July 1996
When the plane taking Fraser and Ray to the Northwest Territories is hijacked by an escaped prisoner, the pair quickly find themselves in a dangerous situation. When the plane crashes after the prisoner bails out, Fraser is left with a bad concussion that causes him to become temporarily blinded. Ray must now help Fraser and himself to survive and track down the escaped prisoner. Featuring Steve Smith as an airport clerk, credited as his most famous character, Red Green.
25	2	"Vault"	Steve DiMarco	Jeff King & Paul Haggis & Kathy Slevin	7 December 1995	3 August 1996
Ray is furious after being declared legally dead, and takes Fraser with him as he goes to withdraw his savings from his local bank. Both soon find themselves caught up in a robbery, leading to them trapped in the vault, with only a matter of time to escape before the air runs out.
26	3	"Witness"	George Bloomfield	Peter Mohan	14 December 1995	10 August 1996
Ray ends up in jail for contempt of court, so Fraser has himself arrested in order to protect him.
27	4	"Bird in the Hand"	Paul Haggis	Paul Haggis	21 December 1995	17 August 1996
Fraser finds himself caught between his duty and his emotions, when he learns that the man who killed his father has gone missing while being transferred to the United States to give evidence. Both he and Ray find themselves in race to locate him fast before someone kills him, learning his evidence is linked to a case involving gun smuggling.
28	5	"The Promise"	George Bloomfield	Michael Teversham	11 January 1996	24 August 1996
Fraser becomes involved in a search for a pair of sibling street kids, after they pickpocket his boss during an evening out. However, he quickly learns that they have attracted unwanted attention when a killer loses an address book to them, after taking it from his victim that same evening. As he and Ray search for the pair, they soon learn that the book is highly sought out by a politician currently facing an election. One of the sibling street kids is later kidnapped by this same killer losing an address book to them and who also happens to work as a bodyguard for that politician. Now, Ray and Fraser must save her. Featured Music: "Goodbye Train" by Big Sugar
29	6	"Mask"	David Warry-Smith	Jeff King	18 January 1996	31 August 1996
A pair of valuable aboriginal masks are stolen from a museum on the evening of their arrival. Ray and Fraser work to discover who arranged their theft, after one of the thieves is apprended, and quickly find themselves dealing with lies, a host of Native tricksters, and a veil of deception. Featured Music: "Ragged Ass Road" by Tom Cochrane
30	7	"Juliet is Bleeding"	George Bloomfield	Jeff King & Kathy Slevin	1 February 1996	7 September 1996
Ray finds himself torn between his love for a mobster's sister (guest star Carrie-Anne Moss) and his compulsion for revenge against Frank Zuko, the neighborhood Mafia don, whom Ray believes to have murdered Detective Gardino. Featured Music: "Funiculì, Funiculà", arrangement by Suzie Katayama, "Mi'Amore, Mia Pistola" by Jack Lenz & Jay Semko, "Raimondo Sta Sanguinando" by Jack Lenze & Jay Semko, "My Foolish Heart" by Pat Ferenga, "Full Circle" by Loreena McKennitt, "Ghost of a Feeling" by Cindy Valentine
31	8	"One Good Man, aka Thank You Kindly, Mr. Capra"	Malcolm Cross	Story by : Frank Siracusa; Teleplay by : Jeff King & Kath Slevin	8 February 1996	14 September 1996
With the aid of a Chicago journalist (guest star Maria Bello), Fraser faces off with a corrupt landlord in an attempt to keep his home and his neighbourhood from going under the wrecking ball. Featured Music: "Lock Stock and Teardrop" by Andi Duncan
32	9	"The Edge"	Richard J. Lewis	Seth Freeman	15 February 1996	21 September 1996
Fraser is pitted against a political assassin (guest star Ken Foree) whose superior survival skills cause the Mountie to question whether or not he has lost his edge.
33	10	"We Are the Eggmen"	George Bloomfield	Story by : James Kramer; Teleplay by : Peter Mohan & Michael Treversham	22 February 1996	28 September 1996
Fraser saves the driver of a truck (guest star Louis Del Grande) from a major accident, then is stunned when the driver nails Fraser, the Mounties and the Government of Canada with a $10,000,000 lawsuit. Featured Music: "All Praise Be To Thee" by the Baha'i Chorale
34	11	"Starman"	David Warry-Smith	Frank Siracusa	29 February 1996	5 October 1996
A compulsive liar (guest star Rino Romano) drags Fraser and Ray into a web of lies and a search for his fiancee, Audrey (guest star Amanda Tapping), who he claims has been abducted by aliens. Featured Music: "Have I Told You Lately That I Love You?" by Willie Nelson, "Calling Occupants of Interplanetary Craft" by Klaatu, "See The Light" by Jeff Healey.
35	12	"Some Like it Red"	Gilbert Shilton	Luciano Comici & Elizabeth Comici	28 March 1996	4 January 1997
When Ray bumps into his former eighth grade sweetheart, now a nun at a girls school, he offers to help her in finding a runaway student. In order to learn where they went, Fraser decides to go undercover as a woman teacher, whereupon he and Ray learn that the student may have discovered the location of a hidden mob stash that is being sought out by unsavoury seekers. Featured Music: "Flying" by Blue Rodeo, "Heart of Glass" by Blondie.
36	13	"White Men Can't Jump to Conclusions"	Steve DiMarco	David Shore	4 April 1996	11 January 1997
Ray arrests Tyree, a high school basketball player, for what appears to be a gang-related shooting. Though he pleads guilty both Fraser and Ray believe he's taking the fall for someone else. Guest starring basketball player Isiah Thomas as himself. Featured Music: "Peeps" by Cipher
37	14	"All the Queen's Horses"	George Bloomfield	Story by : Paul Gross & John Krizanc & Paul Quarrington; Teleplay by : Paul Gross	11 April 1996	18 January 1997
Fraser joins his boss Inspector Thatcher and Sgt. Frobisher in overseeing the transportation of the RCMP's famed equestrian team the Musical Ride on a whirlwind tour of North America. However, they quickly find their train hijacked by terrorists who seem to want to ransom its passengers, but discover that they intend to send it, rigged with explosives, into a head-on collision with a train carrying spent uranium rods. The Mounties are helped by Fraser's dead father, Sgt. Robert Fraser, who Sgt. Frobisher is surprised to see and talk with. Featured Music: "Ride Forever" by Paul Gross
38	15	"Body Language"	Jon Cassar	James Kramer	25 April 1996	12 October 1996
Fraser's daring effort to reunite a woman with a stuffed rabbit she dropped, leads both him and Ray to receive a tip-off to a crime. Intrigued, both attempt to find out how she knew this, and discover themselves getting into the crossfire between rival mobsters battling for control of Chicago's strip joints.
39	16	"The Duel"	Gilbert Shilton	Seth Freeman	2 May 1996	25 January 1997
Fraser and Ray find themselves caught up in a deadly game of cat-and-mouse with a brilliant and resourceful adversary (guest star Colm Feore) - a parolee whom Ray jailed for arson, and suspects of being involved in fraud and the murder of two women. As the game sees anyone related to the detective placed in mortal danger, Fraser begins to question the circumstances of the arson investigation as Ray faces a possible internal affairs inquiry.
40	17	"Red, White, or Blue"	George Bloomfield	Story by : Paul Gross & John Krizanc; Teleplay by : Paul Gross	16 May 1996	1 February 1997
As star witness in the trial of a terrorist he apprehended, Fraiser falls out with Ray over the media attention he is getting. However, both find themselves take hostage by a members of the terrorist's group, who seek to break him out during his trail, leaving both men forced to work together to not only save themselves, but the jurors and judge taken hostage in the chaos.
41	18	"Flashback"	Gilbert Shilton	Peter Mohan & Michael Treversham	19 September 1996	31 March 1997
While in pursuit of fleeing diamond thieves, Fraser is thrown from the back of the van and is so badly concussed that he loses his memory. With no other witnesses and the hostage in jeopardy, Ray must race to help get Fraser his memory back and recall the van's licence plate number, by seeing if anything familiar speeds up his recovery. Note: This episode, a clip episode, was slated to be the final episode of the show after CBS pulled its funding for the second time. The closing credits ran over various outtakes of the two leads breaking into laughter. CTV had a special airing of this episode, but CBS never broadcast this episode. It took almost two and a half years before it was officially shown in the United States on the TNT network.

=== Season 3 (1997–98) ===
No. overall	No. in season	Title	Directed by	Written by	Original CAN. air date	Original U.K. air date
42	1	"Burning Down the House"	George Bloomfield	Paul Gross	14 September 1997	30 May 1998
Fraser returns to Chicago after a vacation in Canada, only to find someone masquerading as Ray Vecchio - Stanley "Ray" Kowalski. As he tries to get to the truth of where Vecchio is, the pair find themselves on the trail of an arsonist, connected to another currently detained at a mental institution, and who seems to be hounding them.
43	2	"Eclipse"	Richard J. Lewis	John Krizanc	21 September 1997	6 June 1998
Internal Affairs begins an investigation of Ray Vecchio after receiving an allegation from a convict, placing pressure on Lt. Welsh. Fraser is tasked by him with finding Kowalski, who is posing as Vecchio whilst he is deep undercover, to refute the charges, only to learn he is staking out a cemetery in pursuit of a criminal from his past. Featured music: "Oh, What a Feeling" by Crowbar
44	3	"I Coulda Been a Defendant"	Jimmy Kaufman	Jeff F. King	28 September 1997	13 June 1998
Fraser and Kowalski are surprised to discover a local hero is in reality a Federally protected witness, under the protection of his brother in the Department of Justice, after giving evidence against a group of robbers he helped. As the pair become involved in ensuring his safety when someone attempts to kill the witness, Fraser begins having doubts about the nature of the case as evidence on each robber narrows down who is the assassin. Featured music: "Brothers in Arms" by Dire Straits
45	4	"Strange Bedfellows"	George Bloomfield	R.B. Carney	5 October 1997	20 June 1998
Fraser and Kowalski inadvertently makes himself and Fraser become bodyguards for a city councilman, after saving him from a shooter whilst spying on his date - Kowalski's ex-wife Stella. As they deal with protests over a new development, Fraser uncovers deception regarding the shooting, and evidence that Stella is being targeted by a bomber. Featured music: "De Cara A La Pared" by Lhasa
46	5	"Seeing Is Believing"	Steve DiMarco	Michael Teversham	12 October 1997	21 December 1998
Thatcher, Kowalski and Welsh witness a murder in a mall, but their versions of the events differ. So Fraser has to solve the crime. Featured music: "November," "Sirens," and "Premonition," all by Mythos
47	6	"The Bounty Hunter"	Steve DiMarco	George F. Walker	19 October 1997	27 June 1998
With Kowalski and most of the precinct out with the blue flu, Fraser helps a bounty hunter (special guest star Wendy Crewson) with three kids on the trail of a bail jumper from Montana. Featured music: "Unloved" by Jann Arden, "You're Everywhere" by Blue Rodeo
48	7	"Mountie and Soul"	Steve DiMarco	R.B. Carney	26 October 1997	7 June 1999
Fraser and Kowalski attend a boxing match aimed at easing problems in a local community, only for the match to turn sour when one of the boxers falls into a coma. As the pair attempt to unravel what happens, they quickly are faced with a murder when the boxer's brother is later found dead shortly after the match abruptly ended. Featured music: "Cubically Contained" by The Headstones, "Slave to Your Love" by Dutch Robinson
49	8	"Spy vs. Spy"	Paul Lynch	David Cole	2 November 1997	22 December 1998
Fraser's chess partner (special guest star Eric Christmas) claims that he is a spy, claims that seem all too real when they get trapped in the middle of an international arms deal, and encounter the shadowy spymaster Pike (special guest star Maury Chaykin).
50	9	"Asylum"	George Bloomfield	Paul Quarrington	16 November 1997	31 May 1999
Kowalski is framed for the murder of a crime boss, and goes to Fraser at the Canadian consulate for help. Fraser promptly arrests Kowalski for the crime. Since the Canadian consulate is considered Canadian soil, this means Kowalski can't be turned over to the Chicago PD until extradition papers are filed. With Kowalski safe as long as he doesn't leave the consulate, Fraser works to exonerate Kowalski. Featured music: "Boring Days" by Race
51	10	"Perfect Strangers"	Francis Damberger	David Cole	30 November 1997	23 December 1998
The murder of one of Kowalski's informants is seemingly connected to the murder of a Canadian flight attendant. Kowalski and Fraser must get to the bottom of it before the flight attendant's father, a highly decorated Canadian general, decides to take the law into his own hands. Meanwhile, Inspector Thatcher asks Fraser to support her in the process of becoming a mother. Featured music: "Heroic Doses" by Glueleg, "Watching the Apples Grow" by Stan Rogers
52	11	"Dead Guy Running"	George Bloomfield	Julie Lacey	4 January 1998	14 June 1999
When Kowalski punches the wall of an interrogation room, he and Fraser discover a corpse behind it. The victim had several run-ins with Vecchio...meaning Vecchio is the prime suspect. Knowing that an investigation could reveal Kowalski's true identity and blow Vecchio's cover, Fraser and Kowalski work to hide the corpse from the rest of the precinct while they solve the murder.
53	12	"Mountie on the Bounty, Part 1"	George Bloomfield	R.B. Carney, Paul Gross & John Krizanc	15 March 1998	3 January 1999
Fraser and Kowalski have an argument that comes to blows, and decide it might be time to end their partnership. But when a sailor with a treasure map carved into his chest shows up dead on Kowalski's car, the case leads the two to a ghost ship on the Great Lakes. Featured music: "Barrett's Privateers" performed by the cast, "Sophia's Pipes" by Ashley MacIsaac, "The Robert MacKenzie" by Paul Gross & Captain Tractor Note: Paul Gross intended to use the Gordon Lightfoot song "The Wreck of the Edmund Fitzgerald" in the episode and Lightfoot granted permission on the condition the families of the sailors agree. But reluctant to cause the families additional pain, Gross and Jay Semko instead wrote and composed "Robert Mackenzie" for the episode.
54	13	"Mountie on the Bounty, Part 2"	George Bloomfield	R.B. Carney, Paul Gross & John Krizanc	22 March 1998	10 January 1999
After escaping from a sinking freighter, Fraser and Kowalski join up with Welsh, Thatcher and a crew of seafaring Mounties (led by special guest star Janet Wright) to commandeer the HMS Bounty and track the pirates across the Great Lakes. Featured music: "Drunken Sailor" by Captain Tractor, "Czardas" by Leahy, "The Robert MacKenzie" by Paul Gross & Captain Tractor

=== Season 4 (1998–99) ===
No. overall	No. in season	Title	Directed by	Written by	Original CAN. air date	Original U.K. air date
55	1	"Doctor Longball"	Larry McLean	Paul Quarrington	23 September 1998	5 July 1999
Fraser, Welsh and Kowalski go to the small town of Willison to aid the town's sheriff, Welsh's brother, in solving a crime wave. The crime wave seems to be targeting the town's baseball team as the make their run for the championship. Featured music: "Take me out to the ballgame" by Trevor Hurst
56	2	"Easy Money"	George Bloomfield	David Shore	30 September 1998	12 July 1999
Fraser's mentor Quinn (special guest star Gordon Tootoosis) comes to Chicago to stop the power company from flooding his land. While waiting to speak with the company's president he and Fraser interrupt a jewelry heist and catch one of the thieves, but they still have to find the jewels.
57	3	"A Likely Story"	Steve DiMarco	John Krizanc	21 October 1998	19 July 1999
Kowalski is on edge because an inmate on death-row that he arrested is due to be executed. He goes to visit her in prison and finds that he no longer believes she's guilty. Now he and Fraser have less than 48 hours to reexamine the old case.
58	4	"Odds"	Steve DiMarco	Rob Forsyth	11 November 1998	26 July 1999
Kowalski's bust of an illegal poker game is interrupted by a gunman who makes off with the money. The Chicago PD arrest the players, one of whom (guest star Stephanie Romanov) becomes bait in an even higher stakes game. Featured music: "Ancient of the Old" by Christina Quinn
59	5	"The Ladies Man"	Stephen Surjik	David Young	21 January 1999	2 August 1999
Fraser and Kowalski investigate the murder of a pretzel vendor. Things grow more and more complicated when it's learned that the pretzel vendor had more than a million dollars, and Kowalski starts falling for the prime suspect. Featured music: "Nice 'N Easy" by Ranee Lee, "Jade Eyes" by Bernie Senensky.
60	6	"Mojo Rising"	Bruce Pitman	Frank Siracusa	28 October 1998	9 August 1999
Fraser and Kowalski interrupt what looks like a hold-up but turns out to be an arrest. The suspect flees in Ray's car leading the pair on a hunt through the Haitian community in Chicago and involving them deeply in practices of Voudoun.
61	7	"Mountie Sings the Blues"	Larry McLean	Gail Collins & David Cole	18 November 1998	16 August 1999
Canadian country singer Tracy Jenkins (played by country singer Michelle Wright) and her manager (guest star Michael Hogan) are offered the protection of the Consulate and the police after receiving a death threat during her tour in Chicago. Fraser and Kowalski investigate who might be after her. Meanwhile, everyone else in the precinct goes country music crazy, as Huey and Dewey try to write a country song, and Jenkins invites Fraser to sing backup on Nobody's Girl. Also featuring Ronnie Hawkins as Jenkin's band leader. Featured music: "Nobody's Girl" and "Every Time You Come Around" by Michelle Wright, "You Were Always On My Mind" by Willie Nelson.
62	8	"Good for the Soul"	George Bloomfield	Peter Mohan	16 December 1998	6 September 1999
Fraser gets in trouble with a mob boss (guest star Alan Scarfe) when he insists that he apologizes to the waiter he backhanded and persists on interfering with his business. Ray tries to convince Fraser to drop it but Fraser refuses. Featured music: "Watching the Apples Grow" by Stan Rogers, "On wit da Show" by Kardinal Offishall, "It Came Upon a Midnight Clear" and "Silent Night", performed by Dutch Robinson, "Mind" by Steve Clark
63	9	"Dead Men Don't Throw Rice"	George Bloomfield	David Cole	4 November 1998	13 September 1999
Fraser and Kowalski protect a witness before he testifies. However, after losing said witness, its up to Fraser to go undercover...in a coffin! Featured music: "Rinse Myself Dry (Space Ace Re-mix)" by My Brilliant Beast
64	10	"Say Amen"	George Bloomfield	John Krizanc	4 March 1999	20 September 1999
Fraser, Kowalski and Thatcher witness the kidnapping of a young girl (Elisabeth Rosen). The clues lead to a church, where the pastor ( David Fox) is harboring a dark secret. Meanwhile, this adventure leads to a spiritual awakening in Thatcher. Featured music: "I Do Believe in Miracles" and "Not One Little Bit" performed by the Youth Outreach Mass Choir and the Unionville High School Choir
65	11	"Hunting Season"	Francis Damberger	John Krizanc	11 March 1999	11 October 1999
Constable Maggie Mackenzie (guest star Jessica Steen), on the trail of her husband's killers, ends up in Chicago. Fraser and Kowalski vie for her attentions, while Fraser Sr. remarks that she looks like a former friend of his, a widowed trapper he met after his own wife died. When Maggie can hear, and eventually see, Fraser Sr., the Frasers deduce that she is Benton's half-sister. Featured music: "Song for a Winter's Night" by Sarah McLachlan, "Watching the Apples Grow" by Stan Rogers
66	12	"Call of the Wild, Part 1"	Steve DiMarco	Paul Gross & R. B. Carney	14 March 1999	25 October 1999
Fraser confides to Kowalski that he's starting to feel homesick, and that it might be time for his Chicago adventures to end. But when Fraser catches a corpse while ice fishing, the corpse puts him on the trail of international arms dealer Holloway Muldoon...the man who killed his mother. Fraser just may get his wish as old friends come back to help with the case. Featuring the return of David Marciano as the real Ray Vecchio and Leslie Nielsen as Buck Frobisher. Featured music: "Full of Grace" by Sarah McLachlan
67	13	"Call of the Wild, Part 2"	Steve DiMarco	Paul Gross & R. B. Carney	14 March 1999	1 November 1999
Fraser and Kowalski begin to contemplate what the future may hold for them, as they pursue Muldoon across the Yukon. It all brings them to a final standoff on Franklin Bay. Featuring the SkyHawks Parachute Team as a troop of RCMP paratroopers. Featured music: "Resurrection" by Moist, "Northwest Passage" by Stan Rogers, "Holy Tears" by Tara MacLean
