= John Krizanc =

Canadian playwright (born 1956)

John Krizanc (born 1956) is a Canadian playwright who established an international reputation with his non-linear work Tamara.

== Early life ==
Krizanc was born in Lethbridge, Alberta, in 1956. He is the son of Peggy and Rene Krizanc.

== Career ==
Tamara premiered at Strachan House in Trinity-Bellwoods Park, Toronto, Ontario, on May 8, 1981, and was published as a book the same year. Exploring the rise of Fascism in 1920s Italy, the play was one of the first non-linear, immersive theatre experiences. The audience followed different characters through an Italian villa, with several scenes playing simultaneously.

Several real people are fictionalized in the work, including Polish artist Tamara de Lempicka; Italian war hero, journalist, and poet General Gabriele D'Annunzio; and Aélis Mazoyer, the mistress and housekeeper of D'Annunzio. The New York Times called it "a shot of adrenaline for sedentary theatergoers" and praised its "thunderstruck" dialogue. Director Steven Spielberg, speaking at the Directors Guild of America, raised the play as a memorable influence on his own storytelling. After its Toronto production, directed by Richard Rose, won Krizanc two Dora Mavor Moore Awards in 1982, the play toured the United States, Portugal, Poland, Argentina, and Mexico. Moses Znaimer produced the Hollywood production, which ran for nine years, from 1984 to 1994.

Tamara was one of the first theatre productions with multi-story lines happening simultaneously where the audience's participation was key to the experience itself. As such, it was the forerunner of later immersive experiences, such as those created by the British theatre company Punchdrunk and New York's Then She Fell. The concepts it explored became the inspiration for the academic journal Tamara: Journal of Critical Postmodern Organization Science, which later became Tamara: Journal for Critical Organization Inquiry, which focuses on plurivocal and postmodern interpretations of several academic disciplines, including critical management studies, postmodern organization theory, and social systems theory.

Krizanc's plays are marked by his explorations not only with structure and space but also with the role of the artist. For his play Prague, Krizanc won the 1985 Chalmers Award and the 1987 Governor General's Award. Set in 1983, the play focuses on a theatre company about to mount a "dangerous" work. Inspired by the one-act plays of Václav Havel, it deals with the challenges of creating art in a communist country and the role of the artist within a system of censorship.

In 1990, Krizanc won the Chalmers Award for his play The Half of It, which tells the story of idealistic thirty-something Jill Ashe and the intersection of capitalism and environmentalism through the travails of one family. His friendship with Canadian writer Paul Quarrington became the subject of the play Dying Is Easy.

In 1993, Krizanc began writing for the screen and television. His many writing credits include the movie Men with Brooms, the telefilms H_{2}O, The Trojan Horse and The Summit, as well as writing for the television series Da Vinci's Inquest, Due South, ZOS: Zone of Separation, Rookie Blue, Saving Hope, Caught and Departure.

Often, he has collaborated with actor and director Paul Gross.

== Bibliography ==
- Crimes of Innocence, 1976
- Uterine Knights, 1979
- Tamara, 1981
- Prague, 1984
- Desire: An Experiment in Comedy, 1985
- The Half of It, 1989 ISBN 0-88784-501-0 (Anansi)
- The Gist, 2000

== Awards and honours ==
- 1982, Dora Mavor Moore Award (for Tamara)
- 1982, Dora Mavor Moore Award (for Tamara)
- 1985, Chalmers award (for Prague)
- 1985, The L.A. Drama Critics Circle, (for Tamara)
- 1986, the Drama-Logue award (for Tamara)
- 1987 Governor General award (for Prague).
- 1988, Gemini, for Due South.
- 1990, the Argentine Critic's Hugo Award (for Tamara)
- 1990, Chalmers Award (for The Half of It).
- 1994, Robert W Wagner Screenwriting award (for Dieppe)
- 1994, Golden Reel Award for best mini-series (for Dieppe).
- 2005, Writers Guild of Canada award for best television mini-series (for H_{2}O).
- 2010, Writers Guild of Canada award (for television series The Summit)
- 2010, Seoul World Television Prize (for television series, The Summit)
