= Kiss Shot =

1989 American television film starring Whoopi Goldberg

- Directed by: Jerry London
- Starring: Whoopi Goldberg, Dennis Franz, Tasha Scott, David Marciano
- Release date: February 26, 1989
- Running time: 100 minutes
- Country: United States
- Language: English

Kiss Shot is a 1989 American made-for-television film starring Whoopi Goldberg as a woman who turns to the world of pool hustling to resolve her financial woes. It was directed by Jerry London and also features performances by Dennis Franz, Tasha Scott, and David Marciano.
