= Dennis Franz =

American actor (born 1944)

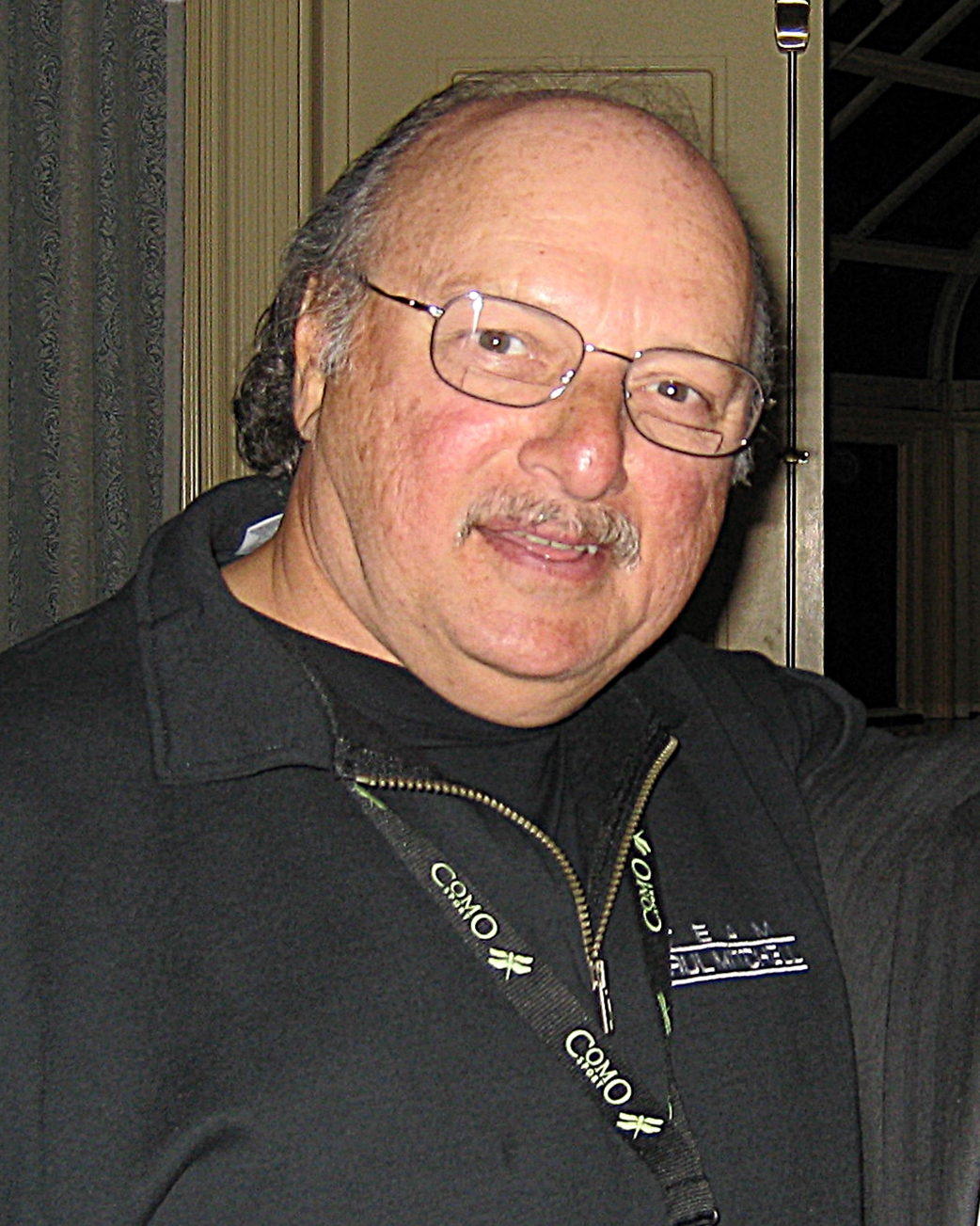
- Franz in 2008
- Born: Dennis Franz Schlachta; October 28, 1944 (age 82); Maywood, Illinois, U.S.
- Education: Wilbur Wright College; Southern Illinois University Carbondale
- Occupation: Actor
- Years active: 1965–2005
- Spouse: Joanie Zeck (m. 1995)
- Military career
- Allegiance: United States
- Branch: United States Army
- Service years: 1968–1969
- Units: 82nd Airborne Division; 101st Airborne Division
- Conflicts: Vietnam War

Dennis Franz Schlachta (/frɑːnz/; born October 28, 1944), known professionally as Dennis Franz, is a retired American actor best known for his role as NYPD Detective Andy Sipowicz in the ABC television series NYPD Blue (1993–2005), a role that earned him a Golden Globe Award, three Screen Actors Guild Awards and four Primetime Emmy Awards. He also portrayed two different characters on the similar NBC series Hill Street Blues (1983, 1985–1987) and its short-lived spin-off, Beverly Hills Buntz (1987–1988).

== Early life ==
Franz was born October 28, 1944, in Maywood, Illinois, the son of German immigrants Eleanor (née Mueller), a postal worker from an Ashkenazi Jewish family, and Franz Ferdinand Schlachta, who was a baker and postal worker of German and Polish descent. He has two older sisters, Heidi Deigl (born 1935) and Marlene Schraut (born 1937).

Franz is a 1962 graduate of Proviso East High School in Maywood. During his high school years, he was active in baseball, football and swimming. He attended Wilbur Wright College and Southern Illinois University Carbondale, graduating from the latter with a bachelor's degree in speech and theater in 1968.

After graduating from college, Franz was drafted into the U.S. Army. He served eleven months with the 82nd Airborne Division and the 101st Airborne Division in the Vietnam War.

== Career ==
Franz began his acting career at Chicago's Organic Theater Company. Although he has in the past performed Shakespeare, his physical appearance led to his being typecast early in his career as a cop. (By Franz's own count, the character of Andy Sipowicz was his 28th role as a police officer.) He also guest starred in shows such as The A-Team and Hunter. Other major roles were on the television series Hill Street Blues in which he played two characters over the run of the show. Franz first played the role of the corrupt Detective Sal Benedetto in the 1982–1983 season. Benedetto eventually commits suicide when a large-scale scam he was running fails. Franz returned to the series in 1985 as main character Lt. Norman Buntz, remaining until the show's end in 1987. He also starred in the short-lived Beverly Hills Buntz as the same character.

During the late 1970s and early 1980s, Franz worked regularly with directors Brian De Palma and Robert Altman. He appeared in three of Altman's films from this period, and five of De Palma's. In addition, he appeared as airport police captain Carmine Lorenzo in the 1990 film Die Hard 2. His final film role to date was as Nathaniel Messinger in the 1998 film City of Angels.

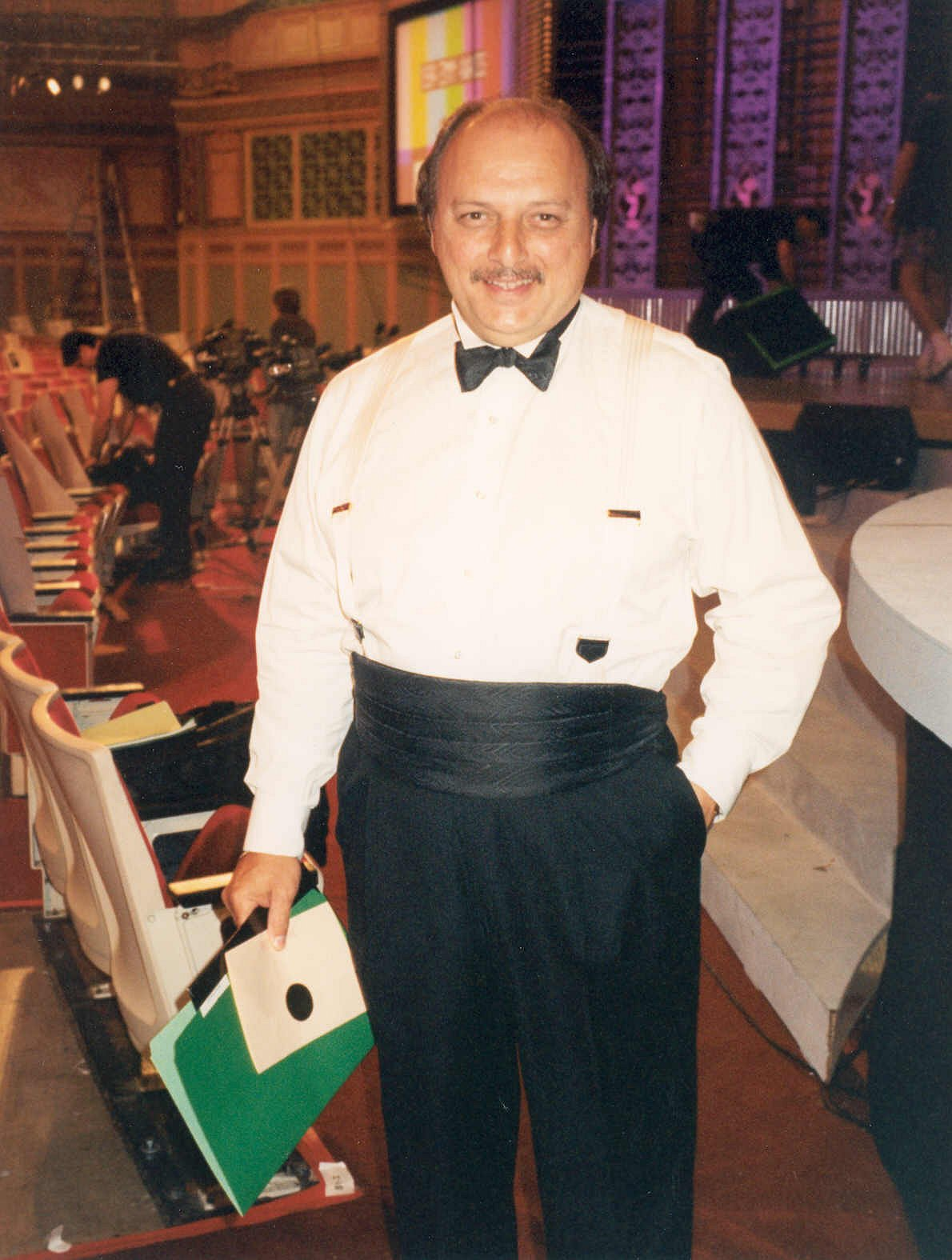
Franz at a rehearsal for the 1994 Emmy Awards

Franz went on to win four Emmy Awards for his portrayal of Andy Sipowicz on NYPD Blue from 1993 to 2005. The character of Sipowicz was ranked No. 23 on Bravo's 100 Greatest TV Characters list. In 1994, while still on NYPD Blue, Franz made a cameo voice appearance as himself in The Simpsons episode "Homer Badman", in which Homer is accused of sexually harassing a babysitter and the case becomes tabloid fodder, generating an exploitative television movie, Homer S.: Portrait of an Ass-Grabber, in which Franz portrays Homer. Franz also voiced Captain Klegghorn, the commanding officer and head of the Anaheim Police Department on the Disney cartoon Mighty Ducks: The Animated Series, which ran from September 1996 to January 1997.

In 2000, Franz starred as Earl, an abusive husband, in the Dixie Chicks' music video "Goodbye Earl". The next year he competed on the May 11 celebrity edition of the hit television game show Who Wants to Be a Millionaire, winning $250,000 for his charity, the National Colorectal Cancer Research Alliance. As a commercial spokesman for Nextel in the early 2000s, Franz appeared as a caricature of himself in commercials, "refusing" to do the commercials, saying they were not something he did.

=== Post-NYPD Blue ===
After the end of the show in 2005, Franz retired from acting to focus on his private life. He mentioned in a 2015 interview with the New York Post that he would be interested in returning to acting if given the right opportunity. He and his wife spend their summers in their lake home in Northern Idaho. He spoke of wartime experiences and postwar trauma of veterans at a Memorial Day concert in 2012 (speaking in the first person, although it was not his own story). He and his former NYPD Blue co-star, Jimmy Smits, made a surprise appearance at the 2016 Primetime Emmy Awards, presenting the award for Outstanding Drama Series to Game of Thrones.

== Personal life ==
In 1995, Franz married Joanie Zeck; they met in 1982. He is the stepfather of Zeck's two daughters from her previous marriage.

== Filmography ==
=== Film ===
| Year | Title | Role | Notes |
|---|---|---|---|
| 1965 | Mickey One | Minor Role in Dressing Room | Uncredited film debut |
| 1978 | Remember My Name | Franks | |
| 1978 | The Fury | Bob Eggleston | |
| 1978 | Towing | Bar Patron | Uncredited |
| 1978 | A Wedding | Koons | |
| 1978 | Stony Island | Jerry Domino | |
| 1979 | A Perfect Couple | Costa | |
| 1980 | Dressed to Kill | Detective Marino | |
| 1980 | Popeye | Spike | |
| 1981 | Blow Out | Manny Karp | |
| 1983 | Psycho II | Warren Toomey | |
| 1983 | Scarface | Immigration Officer | Voice, uncredited |
| 1984 | Body Double | Rubin | |
| 1985 | Runaway Train | Cop | Uncredited |
| 1986 | A Fine Mess | Phil | |
| 1989 | The Package | Lt. Milan Delich | |
| 1990 | Die Hard 2 | Captain Carmine Lorenzo | |
| 1991 | The Sid Story | Sid | Video short |
| 1992 | The Player | Himself | |
| 1996 | American Buffalo | Don Dubrow | |
| 1997 | Mighty Ducks the Movie: The First Face-Off | Captain Klegghorn | Voice |
| 1998 | City of Angels | Nathaniel Messinger | Final film role |

=== Television ===
| Year | Title | Role | Notes |
|---|---|---|---|
| 1979 | Bleacher Bums | Zig | Television movie |
| 1980 | Chicago Story | Officer Joe Gilland | Television movie |
| 1982 | Chicago Story | Officer Joe Gilland | 13 episodes |
| 1983 | Hill Street Blues | Det. Sal Benedetto | 5 episodes |
| 1983 | Bay City Blues | Angelo Carbone | 8 episodes |
| 1984 | Hardcastle and McCormick | Tony Boutros | Episode: "Did You See the One That Got Away?" |
| 1984 | The A-Team | Sam Friendly | Episode: "Chopping Spree" |
| 1984 | Riptide | Earl Bertrane | Episode: "Double Your Pleasure" |
| 1984 | E/R | The Boyfriend | Episode: "The Sister" |
| 1984 | T. J. Hooker | Andros Margolis | Episode: "Hardcore Connection" |
| 1985 | Simon & Simon | Frank Mahoney | Episode: "Almost Foolproof" |
| 1985 | The A-Team | Brooks | Episode: "Beverly Hills Assault" |
| 1985 | Hardcastle and McCormick | Joe Hayes | Episode: "There Goes the Neighborhood" |
| 1985 | MacGruder and Loud | Roche | Episode: "On the Wire" |
| 1985 | Hunter | Sgt. Jackie Molinas | 2 episodes |
| 1985 | Street Hawk | Inspector Frank Menlo | Episode: "Female of the Species" |
| 1985 | Scene of the Crime | Pat Grandy | Episode: "A Vote for Murder" |
| 1985 | Deadly Messages | Detective Max Lucas | Television movie |
| 1985–1987 | Hill Street Blues | Lt. Norman Buntz | 44 episodes |
| 1987 | Tales from the Hollywood Hills | Louie | Television movie |
| 1987–1988 | Beverly Hills Buntz | Norman Buntz | 13 episodes |
| 1989 | Kiss Shot | Max Fleischer | Television movie |
| 1989 | Matlock | Jack Brennert | 2 episodes |
| 1989 | Christine Cromwell | Detective Grainger | Episode: "Easy Come, Easy Go" |
| 1989 | Nasty Boys | Lt. Stan Krieger | 12 episodes |
| 1989 | Nasty Boys, Part 2: Lone Justice | Lt. Stan Krieger | Television movie |
| 1991 | NYPD Mounted | Tony Spampatta | Unsold TV pilot |
| 1991 | Civil Wars | Murray Seidelman | Episode: "Pilot" |
| 1992 | In the Line of Duty: Siege at Marion | Bob Bryant | Television movie |
| 1993–2005 | NYPD Blue | Detective/Sergeant Andy Sipowicz | 261 episodes |
| 1994 | The Simpsons | Himself playing Homer Simpson | Voice, Episode: "Homer Badman" |
| 1994 | Moment of Truth: Caught in the Crossfire | Gus Payne | Television movie |
| 1995 | Texas Justice | Richard Haynes | Television movie |
| 1996 | Healing the Hate | Host | Television movie |
| 1996–1997 | Mighty Ducks | Captain Klegghorn | Voice, 17 episodes |
| 1998 | Sesame Street | Himself | Episode: "Monster Day" |
