= H2O (miniseries) =

H_{2}O
- DVD cover
- Also known as: H_{2}O: The Last Prime Minister
- Written by: Paul Gross; John Krizanc
- Directed by: Charles Binamé
- Starring: Paul Gross; Leslie Hope; Guy Nadon; Martha Henry; Callum Keith Rennie; Gordon Pinsent; Michael Murphy
- Music by: Jack Lenz
- Country of origin: Canada
- Original language: English

Production
- Producers: Neil Bregman; Paul Gross; Penny McDonald; Frank Siracusa
- Cinematography: Derick V. Underschultz
- Editor: George Roulston
- Running time: 240 min (including commercials)
- Budget: CAD 8,500,000

Original release
- Network: CBC Television
- Release: October 31, 2004

Related
- The Trojan Horse

H_{2}O is a Canadian political thriller two-part miniseries that first aired on the CBC Television October 31, 2004. It starred Paul Gross and Leslie Hope, with then-politician Belinda Stronach making a cameo appearance. Written by Gross and John Krizanc and directed by Charles Binamé, it was nominated for five Gemini Awards and four DGC Craft Awards. It won one Golden Nymph Award for best actor (Paul Gross).

== Plot ==
In the midst of negotiations with the United States Secretary of State, the Prime Minister of Canada dies in a canoeing accident. His son Tom McLaughlin (Paul Gross) returns from overseas to deliver the eulogy at his father's state funeral. The attention it receives propels him into politics and he ultimately becomes prime minister. The investigation into his father's death, however, reveals that it was no accident and raises the possibility of assassination. McLaughlin accepts the U.S. President's plan to develop the Great Recycling and Northern Development Canal to help the United States with its water shortage. Sgt. Leah Collins (Leslie Hope) and Member of Parliament Marc Lavigne (Guy Nadon) slowly piece together evidence of a conspiracy that threatens Canada's existence.

== Cast ==
Actor	Role
Paul Gross	Thomas David McLaughlin
Leslie Hope	Sgt. Leah Collins
Guy Nadon	Marc Lavigne
Martha Henry	Julia McLaughlin
Callum Keith Rennie	Don Pritchard / Lt. Daniel Holt
Gordon Pinsent	Michael Cameron
Michael Murphy	U.S. Ambassador Conrad
Barry Flatman	Cam Ritchie
Louise Portal	Marie Lavigne
Philip Akin	U.S. President Monroe
Macha Grenon	Lavigne's Aide
Peter MacNeill	Police Chief
Jeff Pustil	Deever
Tantoo Cardinal	Grand Chief Katie Blackfire
Diego Matamoros	Doug McKay
Jeff Seymour	Nate Morgan

== Location ==
Filming took place all over the city of Ottawa. Some of the bigger locations included Earnscliffe and the Parliament Buildings of Canada.

== Sequel ==
The Trojan Horse, featuring McLaughlin's continuing political ambitions and struggles in the wake of the events of H_{2}O, premiered on CBC on Sunday, 30 March 2008.
