= The Trojan Horse (miniseries) =

2008 miniseries

- Created by: Paul Gross; John Krizanc
- Written by: John Krizanc; Paul Gross
- Directed by: Charles Binamé
- Starring: Paul Gross; Greta Scacchi; Tom Skerritt
- Country of origin: Canada
- Original language: English
- No. of episodes: 2

Production
- Executive producers: Paul Gross; Frank Siracusa

Original release
- Network: CBC
- Release: 30 March – 6 April 2008

Related
- H_{2}O

The Trojan Horse is a Canadian political drama two-part miniseries that first aired on CBC Television on 30 March 2008. It is a sequel to the 2004 miniseries H_{2}O. It stars Paul Gross, Greta Scacchi and Tom Skerritt. It was directed by Charles Binamé.

== Plot ==
A nationwide referendum is held to decide whether or not Canada will join the United States. The people of Canada vote to join the U.S., while Prime Minister Tom McLaughlin (Paul Gross) watches the results on the news. Sitting at the house of former Prime Minister Marc Lavigne (Guy Nadon; from H_{2}O), McLaughlin plots revenge, stating that one day, he would tell Lavigne the fable of "The Frog and the Mouse".

Two years pass, at which point Canada has been split into six states (British Columbia, Alberta, Manitoba, Ontario, Quebec and Terra Nova), each with electoral votes, and representation in Congress. The focus shifts to three major storylines: Tom McLaughlin attempting to reshape his political career and ascend to the presidency; reporter Helen Madigan (Greta Scacchi) uncovering elements of political intrigue as she follows leads into the murder of her estranged son; and U.S. President Stanfield (Tom Skerritt) using any means necessary to justify an invasion of Saudi Arabia in order to halt China's oil supply.

== Cast ==
Actor	Role
Paul Gross	Thomas David McLaughlin
Greta Scacchi	Helen Madigan
Rick Cosnett	Will Tullman
Tom Skerritt	President William Stanfield
Martha Burns	Mary Miller
Clark Johnson	John Neelon
Saul Rubinek	Rafe Kott
Rachael Crawford	Colleen Howell
Kenneth Welsh	Randall Spear
William Hutt	Miles Fortnum (of MI6)
Stephen McHattie	Jack Shea
