= Due South =

Canadian crime drama series (1994–1999)

- Genre: Comedy drama
- Created by: Paul Haggis
- Starring: Paul Gross; David Marciano; Beau Starr; Daniel Kash; Tony Craig; Catherine Bruhier; Gordon Pinsent; Ramona Milano; Camilla Scott; Callum Keith Rennie; Tom Melissis
- Composers: Jay Semko (and theme); Jack Lenz; John McCarthy (not credited in the revival seasons)
- Country of origin: Canada
- Original language: English
- No. of seasons: 4
- No. of episodes: 67 (list of episodes)

Production
- Running time: 45 minutes (approx.)
- Production companies: Alliance Communications (1994–1998) (seasons 1–3); Alliance Atlantis (1998–1999) (season 4)

Original release
- Network: CTV
- Release: April 23, 1994 – March 14, 1999

Due South is a Canadian crime comedy-drama television series created by Paul Haggis, and produced by Alliance Communications from its premiere on April 23, 1994, to its conclusion after four seasons on March 14, 1999. The series starred Paul Gross, David Marciano, Gordon Pinsent, Beau Starr, Catherine Bruhier, Camilla Scott, Ramona Milano, and Callum Keith Rennie. The show follows the adventures of Royal Canadian Mounted Police (RCMP) Constable Benton Fraser, who first came to Chicago on the trail of the killers of his father, and has remained, attached as liaison with the Canadian Consulate. He works alongside a detective of the Chicago Police Department to solve crimes. Both are aided at times by Fraser's deaf white wolf, Diefenbaker.

The show's format mixed between elements of a police drama and comedy, derived from the stereotypical differences between Canadian and American culture at the time. It also included elements of fantasy derived from Gross' character being visited by the memory of his father who often provides mixed advice on situations. The series itself was mostly filmed in Toronto, and was assisted with financing on later seasons by the BBC, which aired episodes on British television.

== History ==
Due South originally debuted as a television movie on CTV in Canada and CBS in the United States. After higher-than-anticipated ratings, Due South was turned into a continuing drama series in 1994. It was the first Canadian-made series to have a prime time slot on a major American network.

After the 24-episode first season, CBS cancelled the series, but the show's success in Canada and the United Kingdom enabled the production company to raise enough money to mount a second thirteen-episode season, which ran from 1995 to 1996. The show was once again shown on CBS in late 1995 after many fall shows had failed (CBS ordered an additional five episodes, raising the number to eighteen, but broadcast only four of them), but CBS did not renew the series.

After a one-year hiatus, CTV revived the series in 1997 with international investment (from the BBC, ProSiebenSat.1 Media AG, and TF1), and it ran for two further seasons, until 1999. In the United States, seasons three and four were packaged together as a single 26-episode season for syndication. Despite critical acclaim and a consistently warm reception by American audiences, Due South never became a huge hit in the United States; however, it was one of the most highly rated regular series ever broadcast by a Canadian network. The show remained popular in the United Kingdom, and became one of the few non-British shows of the period to have a prime-time weeknight slot on BBC One.

=== UK ===
In the UK, Due South was first broadcast on Tuesday May 9, 1995, earning critical acclaim with comparisons to Northern Exposure and ratings of over eight million. The series continued on either a Tuesday or Friday every week except August until November 28, 1995. Season two was broadcast on Saturday nights from July 27, 1996 and fared similarly well, but was pulled from the schedules in mid October, with Noel's House Party taking its slot. The remaining 6 episodes were shown in January 1997, with the last episode going out on Easter Monday. The series was given a full repeat during the 1997 summer holidays each weekday morning.

The BBC helped co-finance the third series, however the BBC struggled to find a suitable slot on Saturday nights, with only six episodes being broadcast from May - July, with three further episodes before Christmas 1998, and a further two in early January 1999. From May 1999, the remaining episodes from series 3 and all of series 4 were broadcast until November 1999, on BBC Two and consistently performed well, with ratings of over two million viewers, regularly appearing in the top-ten weekly shows for the channel. Upon the end of the series in 1999, BBC Two immediately began to screen repeats, and the series ITV3 rescreened the series in 2006, while BBC Two from October 18, 2010, give the series another repeat run. A rerun on digital channel True Entertainment began on October 10, 2014, with the pilot, with regular-series episodes following on weekdays from October 13. When True Entertainment closed mid-2019 it was replaced with Sony Channel where the series was broadcast in full commencing late 2020.

== Premise ==
The premise of the series centres on the exploits of Constable Benton Fraser, an officer in the Royal Canadian Mounted Police (RCMP) who travels south to Chicago to initially solve the murder of his father, Sergeant Robert Fraser. Upon arriving in Chicago, Fraser promptly finds the Chicago PD detective assigned to his father's case, Raymond Vecchio, and they work together to solve the case. However, during their investigation, Fraser uncovers a scheme by several corrupt members of the RCMP that results in the shutdown of a new dam and the loss of many jobs, resulting in him being permanently stationed as a liaison officer in the Canadian consulate. Fraser continues working with Vecchio in solving cases around the city and occasionally across the border in Canada. Starting in the third season, Fraser works alongside a second partner, Stanley Raymond Kowalski, who poses as Vecchio after he leaves to assist in an undercover operation.

Fraser often differs in his manners, including his politeness and honesty, and his methods of solving crimes, but is determined and dogged in pursuing and bringing down suspects, including his ability to predict where they might attempt to escape. Alongside his partner in the Chicago Police Department, Fraser is accompanied at times by a deaf lip-reading half-wolf named Diefenbaker, whom he adopted after the canine saved his life. Starting with the first season's Christmas episode, Fraser finds himself visited by the ghost of his father Robert, whom only he can see, often providing mixed advice on his cases - with Robert appearing at random, infrequent moments. In the third season, the ghost appears more frequently, often within the wardrobe of his son's office at the consulate; anyone else who tries to follow merely finds Fraser.

== Cast ==
The following lists the primary actors who appear in the series, and the respective roles they held:

- Paul Gross as Constable Benton Fraser
- David Marciano as Detective Raymond "Ray" Vecchio (Seasons 1–2, Guest Star 3–4)
- Beau Starr as Lieutenant Harding Welsh
- Catherine Bruhier as Elaine Besbriss (Seasons 1–3)
- Daniel Kash as Detective Louis Gardino (Seasons 1–2)
- Tony Craig as Detective Jack Huey
- Gordon Pinsent as Sgt. Robert "Bob" Fraser
- Ramona Milano as Francesca Vecchio
- Camilla Scott as Inspector Meg Thatcher (Seasons 2–4)
- Callum Keith Rennie as Detective Stanley Raymond "Ray" Kowalski (Seasons 3–4)
- Tom Melissis as Detective Thomas E. Dewey (Seasons 3–4)

The following lists prominent recurring cast members and their respective roles:

- Leslie Nielsen as Sgt. Buck Frobisher (Seasons 1–4)
- Alex Carter as F.B.I. Agent Ford (Seasons 1–3)
- Mark Melymick as F.B.I. Agent Deeter (Seasons 1–3)
- Lee Purcell as D.A. Louise St. Laurent (Seasons 1–2)
- Shay Duffin as Father Behan (Season 1)
- Christopher Babers as William "Willie" Lambert (Season 1)
- Deborah Rennard as Dr. Esther Pearson (Season 1)
- Melina Kanakaredes as Victoria Metcalf (Season 1)
- Dean McDermott as Constable Renfield Turnbull (Seasons 2–4)
- Anne Marie Loder as Assistant State Attorney Stella Kowalski (Seasons 3–4)
- Jan Rubeš as Dr. Mort Gustafson (Seasons 3–4)

Notable guest stars include:

- Teri Polo as Stephanie Cabot (Season 1)
- Mark Ruffalo as Vinnie Webber (Season 1)
- Ryan Phillippe as Del Porter (Season 1)
- Jonathan Banks as Garret (Season 1)
- Jane Krakowski as Katherine Burns (Season 1)
- Milton Berle as Shelley Litvak (Season 2)
- Ron Canada as Franco Devlin (Season 3)
- Max Gail Jr. as Sheriff Wilson Welsh (Season 4)
- Bruce Weitz as Huck (Season 4)
- Michelle Wright as Tracy Jenkins (Season 4)
- Jessica Steen as Maggie (Season 4)

== Production ==
Filming was mostly done in Toronto, Ontario, which was used as a stand-in for Chicago. In many episodes a Toronto Transit Commission bus can be seen in the background. In others, prominent city landmarks such as the CN Tower and the Union Station can be glimpsed. Part of the series was shot in Banff National Park, Alberta.

== Media ==
=== Books ===
Due South: The Official Companion by Geoff Tibballs was published in May 1998 containing basic information on the series and cast and brief episodes synopses up to the end of the third season. Another illustrated companion, Due South: The Official Guide by John A. Macdonald was published in December 1998. It contains some interviews with the characters and bios of the cast.

Four paperback novelizations by Graeme Grant writing as "Tom McGregor" were published in the UK; these were:

- Death in the Wilderness (1996), based on the pilot movie (teleplay by Paul Haggis)
- An Invitation to Romance (1996), based on the episodes "An Invitation to Romance" and "Gift of the Wheelman" (teleplays by Paul Haggis and Deborah Rennard)
- Vaulting North (1997), based on "North" and "Vault" (teleplays by Kathy Slevin, screenstories by Jeff F. King, Paul Haggis and Kathy Slevin)
- All the Queen's Horses (1997), based on "All the Queen's Horses" and "Red, White or Blue" (teleplays by Paul Gross, screenstories by Paul Gross, John Krizanc and Paul Quarrington)

=== Videos ===
The pilot two-hour movie was originally released on VHS in 1996, but individual episodes had been released prior to this throughout 1995 on VHS with two episodes per tape. In 1998, the season three and the season four two-part finales were released. In November 2002, the Due South Giftset was released containing the pilot movie and episodes Mountie on the Bounty and Call of the Wild.

=== DVD releases ===
Alliance Atlantis released all 4 seasons on DVD in Canada only. The pilot episode is included on the third season release as a bonus feature.

In the US, Echo Bridge Home Entertainment released the series on DVD in 2005. Seasons 3 and 4 were released together as Due South: Season 3. They also released a series set on May 6, 2008. In 2011, Echo Bridge released the final two episodes, "Call Of The Wild" parts one & two, on a single DVD. In 2014, they released an eight-disk set of all four seasons, allegedly with inferior video quality to the original releases.

In Region 2, Network released the series on DVD in the UK. Seasons 3 and 4 were released together as Due South: The Complete Third Series.

In Region 4, Madman Entertainment released the series on DVD in Australia. Seasons 3 and 4 were released as Due South: Season 3.

DVD Name	Ep#	Release dates			
DVD Name	Ep#	Region 1 (Canada)	Region 1 (US)	Region 2	Region 4
Due South: Season 1	22	November 26, 2002	November 23, 2005	January 30, 2006	August 16, 2006
Due South: Season 2	18	August 5, 2003	August 30, 2005	May 29, 2006	September 29, 2007
Due South: Seasons 3 & 4	26	September 21, 2004	November 11, 2005	September 4, 2006	June 30, 2009
Due South: The Complete Series	68	N/A	May 6, 2008	October 23, 2006	N/A

=== Streaming ===
As of 2017, the show has begun streaming online for free on Canada Media Fund's Encore+YouTube Channel. (Season 1 & 2). Due South is also available on Gem, the Canadian Broadcasting Corporation's streaming app. It is also available on Disney+ in Canada.

== Soundtrack ==
The producers of Due South sought to showcase various Canadian artists within the show's episodes, with many of the featured tracks released the CD soundtrack Due South: The Original Television Soundtrack (1996). Sarah McLachlan's music was most prominently featured with no fewer than seven songs over the full run of the series; other recurring artists included The Headstones, Loreena McKennitt and Colin James. "The Blue Line" (episode #1.16) featured "The Hockey Theme", the longtime theme song of CBC Television's sports series Hockey Night in Canada.

The show's theme was written and composed by Jay Semko of The Northern Pikes (who recorded a version of the song with lyrics, played during the show's closing credits) working with Jack Lenz and John McCarthy. Semko also scored the first two seasons of Due South. In November 1996, the first album was released, including an in-character soliloquy by Paul Gross on the subject of bravery, taken directly from the episode "An Eye for an Eye".

When the show returned for its third season, Semko returned to complete the second soundtrack. The second soundtrack album, Due South, Volume II: The Original Television Soundtrack, was released in June 1998. Both albums are filled largely with the vocals used in the series.

=== Due South: The Original Television Soundtrack (1996) ===
The final scene of the series was set to Stan Rogers' "Northwest Passage", a classic Canadian folk song that has been referred to as an unofficial Canadian anthem.

Due South: The Original Television Soundtrack

Soundtrack album by Various artists
- Released: 1996

Various artists chronology
Due South: The Original Television Soundtrack (1996)	Due South, Volume II: The Original Television Soundtrack (1998)

Due South: The Original Television Soundtrack was a soundtrack album for the Canadian television series Due South, released by Nettwerk Records on October 1, 1996.

Track listing

1. Jay Semko, "Due South Theme"
2. Spirit of the West, "Bone of Contention"
3. Jay Semko, Jack Lenz and John McCarthy, "Cabin Music (Original Score)"
4. Sarah McLachlan, "Possession (Piano Version Edit)"
5. Jay Semko, Jack Lenz and John K. McCarthy, "Horses (Original Score)"
6. Kashtin, "Akua Tuta"
7. The Guess Who, "American Woman"
8. Figgy Duff, "Henry Martin"
9. Paul Gross, "Ride Forever"
10. Blue Rodeo, "Flying"
11. Jay Semko, "Due South Theme (Instrumental)"
12. Holly Cole Trio, "Neon Blue"
13. Jay Semko, Jack Lenz and John McCarthy, "Victoria's Secret (Original Score)"
14. Klaatu, "Calling Occupants of Interplanetary Craft"
15. Toronto Mendelssohn Choir, Elmer Iseler, Roy Thomson Hall Orchestra, Toronto Symphony Orchestra and Andrew Davis, "Eia, Mater (from Stabat Mater)"
16. Paul Gross, "Fraser/Inuit Soliloquy"
17. Jay Semko, Jack Lenz and John K. McCarthy, "Dief's in Love (Original Score)"

=== Due South, Volume II: The Original Television Soundtrack (1998) ===
Due South, Volume II: The Original Television Soundtrack

Soundtrack album by Various artists
- Released: 1998

Various artists chronology
Due South: The Original Television Soundtrack (1996)	Due South, Volume II: The Original Television Soundtrack (1998)

Due South, Volume II: The Original Television Soundtrack was the second soundtrack album for the Canadian television series Due South, released by Nettwerk Records on June 2, 1998.

1. Junkhouse, "Oh, What A Feeling"
2. Captain Tractor, "Drunken Sailor"
3. Paul Gross, "Robert MacKenzie"
4. Vibrolux, "Mind"
5. Jay Semko, "Mountie on the Bounty" (Original Score)
6. Sarah McLachlan, "Song for a Winter's Night"
7. Dutch Robinson, "Slave to Your Love"
8. Single Gun Theory, "From a Million Miles"
9. Trevor Hurst, "Take Me Out to the Ballgame"
10. Mythos, "November"
11. The Headstones, "Cubically Contained"
12. Michelle Wright, "Nobody's Girl"
13. Ashley MacIsaac, "Sophia's Pipes"
14. Jay Semko, "Western End of the Trail" (Original Score)
15. Tara MacLean, "Holy Tears"
16. Jay Semko, "Due South Theme '97"

== Awards ==
Over the three-season run of the series, Due South and its cast and crew earned a number of awards. Most significantly, the show earned 53 Canadian Gemini nominations, winning 15, including Best Dramatic TV series three years running (1995–1997), Paul Gross winning Best Actor in a Continuing Leading Dramatic Role two years running (1995–1996) and creator Paul Haggis winning Best Writing in a Dramatic Series the same two years.

Winner	Award
Paul Gross	Gemini, Best Actor in a Continuing Leading Dramatic Role (1995)
Paul Gross	Gemini, Best Performance by an Actor in a Continuing Leading Dramatic Role (1996)
Gordon Pinsent	Gemini, Best Performance by an Actor in a Guest Role in a Dramatic Series (1996)
Gordon Pinsent	Gemini, Earle Grey Award (1997)
Brent Carver	Gemini, Best Performance by an Actor in a Guest Role Dramatic Series (1998)
Wendy Crewson	Gemini, Best Performance by an Actress in a Guest Role Dramatic Series (1998)
Production Awards	Gemini, Best Dramatic TV Series - (Paul Haggis, Kathy Slevin, Jeff King) (1995)
Production Awards	Gemini, Best TV Movie - (Paul Haggis, Jean Desormeaux, Jeff King) (1995)
Production Awards	Gemini, Best Writing in a Dramatic Series (Kathy Slevin and Paul Haggis for The Pilot) (1995)
Production Awards	Gemini, Best Dramatic Series - (Paul Haggis, Jeff King, Kathy Slevin, George Bloomfield) (1996)
Production Awards	Gemini, Best Writing in a Dramatic Series - (Paul Haggis and David Shore for Hawk and a Handsaw) (1996)
Production Awards	Gemini, Best Direction in a Dramatic or Series - (Jerry Ciccoritti for Gift of the Wheelman) (1996)
Production Awards	Gemini, Best Sound - (Brian Avery, Allen Ormerod, Keith Elliot, Michael Werth, Jann Delpuech for Victoria's Secret) (1996)
Production Awards	Gemini, Best Dramatic Series - (Jeff King and Bob Wertheimer) (1997)
Production Awards	Gemini, Best Writing in a Dramatic Series - (Paul Gross, Robert B. Carney, John Krizanc for Mountie on the Bounty - Part 2) (1998)
Production Awards	Gemini, Best Visual Effects - (Jon Campfens, Barb Benoit, John Cox, Mark Savela for Call of the Wild, Part 2) (1999)

== Critical reception ==
Fraser's methods, usually more sensitive and understanding than is typical for police work, gave the series a reputation for well-rounded characters. Variety critic Adam Sandler praised the acting of Gross and Marciano and attributed the "show's charm" to the writers' development of the two lead characters' relationship. It was named as one of TV's most underrated shows by The Guardian, and Empire critic William Thomas reviewed season 1 and concluded that "At its worst, Due South is a witty and well-written genre hit; at its best, it's one of the most original and quietly influential shows of the mid-'90s."

A reviewer from the Los Angeles Times was less positive, finding the show's portrayal of RCMP officers unrealistic and unfunny.

== Fan conventions ==
A number of fan conventions were organized by Due South fans during the 1990s, the biggest and best-known of which was "RCW 139", so named after the license plate number that recurred throughout the series. RCW 139 was held annually in Toronto between 1996 and 1999, attracting approximately 300 fans from more than 10 countries in both 1998 and 1999. The convention featured games, discussion panels, a formal dinner, and guest panels. Numerous cast and crew members have attended, including David Marciano (1998), Paul Gross (1999), Gordon Pinsent (1998), Tom Melissis (1997, 1998, 1999), Tony Craig (1997), Catherine Bruhier (1998, 1999) and Jay Semko (1998, 1999). Draco (Diefenbaker) and his trainer, Gail Parker, were guests in both 1998 and 1999.

After a nine-year hiatus, the convention was revived in 2008, with guest panels from David Marciano, Jay Semko, Tom Melissis, Catherine Bruhier, and Gail Parker with Cinder, Draco's sister and stunt-double. Another convention was held in August 2010, with Paul Gross, Jay Semko, Tom Melissis, Camilla Scott, Tony Craig, Catherine Bruhier, and Ramona Milano.

RCW 139: From a Million Miles was held from August 17–19, 2012 in Toronto. This event included tours and dining in the Distillery District of Toronto and the Patrician Grill, both of which were frequently used for location filming.

RCW 139: Thank You Kindly was held from August 15–17, 2014 to celebrate the 20th anniversary of Due South. Catherine Bruhier, Ramona Milano, Tom Melissis, and Tony Craig, along with guest star Lisa Jakub ("Chicago Holiday" [#1.07/1.08]), appeared on the cast panel; assistant directors Michael Bowman and Woody Sidarous, costume supervisor Alex Kavanagh, and prop master Craig Williams formed the crew panel. Paul Haggis made an appearance via Skype chat. Included in the activities were a tour of the Distillery District, a bus tour of filming locations, a game of "Due South Jeopardy", and a charity auction of props, scripts, costume pieces, and other series memorabilia. This was the first Due South convention to be webcast for the benefit of fans unable to attend.

== In popular culture ==
- In the MMORPG City of Heroes, budding superheroes could take missions from a Detective Frasenbaker, an apparently superhuman Mountie who moved to the fictional Paragon City while on the trail of his father's killers.
- In the Vinyl Cafe Dave and Morley story, Cousin Dorothy comes to Toronto from England to attend a "Friends of Due South" convention.
- The 2010 movie Barney's Version includes a fake TV show called O'Malley of the South starring Paul Gross in a parody of his own character in Due South.
- At the conclusion of Season 1 Episode 6 ("To Protect and Serve") of The Pretender, a series also shot in and around Toronto at the same time as Due South, Miss Parker is asked where she thinks Jarod has gone. She replies that "He has gone South, Due South." The next scene shows Jarod participating in the RCMP Musical Ride.

== See also ==
- List of Due South episodes
- Television in Canada
