= Catherine Bruhier =

Canadian actress

Catherine Bruhier is a Canadian actress and filmmaker. Born in Belize, she was raised in New Brunswick and has worked in Canada and the United States.

== Early life and education ==
Catherine Bruhier was born in Belize (formerly British Honduras), Central America. Her mother and father were both born and raised in Belize. Her family moved to Saint John, New Brunswick when she was an infant. After graduating from Saint John High School and winning a scholarship and an artistic award, she moved to Toronto to pursue her acting career.

A graduate of the George Brown College Theatre program, she also attended York University. She studied with various acting coaches in Los Angeles: Meisner with Sandy Marshall; Warner Loughlin technique with Warner Loughlin; and Margie Haber's "Living the Life" technique. As an emerging director on her first short film, The Sacrifice, she coached with LA Film School teacher and director the late Jim Pasternak.

== Career ==
Bruhier was cast in Theatre New Brunswick, in David French's two-hander Salt-Water Moon, directed by playwright Sharon Pollock and co-starring Eric McCormack from Will & Grace fame.

She was one of eight directors in Canada chosen to attend the 2010 Women in the Directors Chair at the Banff Arts Centre.

Bruhier is a member of Canadian Actors Equity Association (CAEA), Alliance of Canadian Television and Radio Artists (ACTRA), and Screen Actors Guild.

=== Stage work ===
Bruhier has performed leading roles in theatres across Canada, including Shaw Festival, Grand Theatre London, Factory Theatre, Theatre Passe Muraille, Theatre Aquarius, and Theatre Plus Toronto. She appeared in the Dora Award-winning production of Carrying the Calf.

=== Screen work ===
Her most notable role was starring in 3 seasons as Elaine Besbriss on the Paul Haggis created series Due South.

She co-hosted two seasons of the children's program The Polka Dot Door.

Other screen credits include Jimmy Kimmel Live!, 9-1-1, How to Get Away with Murder, Kim's Convenience, Rookie Blue, Flashpoint, Soulfood, Yes Dear, Frasier, and Port Charles.

In 2013, Bruhier appeared in the feature film The Best Man Holiday, directed by Malcolm D. Lee.

=== Filmmaker ===
Her short film, The Sacrifice, marked her directorial debut and first project from co-founded production company Breaking Ground Productions. While living in Toronto, she was one of the 2011 grant recipients of the Ontario Art Council's Emerging Filmmakers Grant to direct her 2nd short film Clean Teeth Wednesdays.
