= Ramona Milano =

Canadian actress

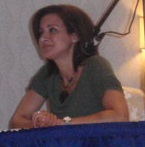
- Citizenship: Canada
- Occupation: Actor

Ramona Milano is a Canadian actress. She is best known for her role as Francesca Vecchio in Due South, Teresa in Cra$h & Burn, and as Audra Torres in Degrassi: The Next Generation. She has also appeared in numerous commercials, for companies such as Rogers, The Co-operators, Colour Catcher and Sleep Country Canada. Milano also co-hosted Living Romance on the W Network.

== Personal life ==
Milano graduated from the Etobicoke School of the Arts in 1987 and performed as a vocalist at Canada's Wonderland before entering the theatre arts program at Humber College.

== Stage work ==
- Game Show (2004) An audience participation production mimicking a TV gameshow set
- God of Carnage (2014) – role: Veronica Novak at the Sudbury Theatre Centre in Sudbury, ON. (Directed by Rod Ceballos)
- The Christmas Tree by Norm Foster (2015) Hamilton & Toronto, ON (Directed by Darren Stewart-Jones)
- Storm Warning by Norm Foster (2018) Bruce County Playhouse
- The Numbers Game (2019) Globus Theatre
- Smarty Pants (2024) Bruce County Playhouse

== Awards ==
Milano has been nominated twice for Gemini Awards, in 1997 and 1999. Both nominations were for "Best Performance by an Actress in a Featured Supporting Role in a Dramatic Series" for her role as Francesca Vecchio in Due South.

== Filmography ==
Year	Title	Role	Media
1994–1999	Due South	Francesca Vecchio	TV series (29 episodes)
1996, 2000	Traders	Jennifer Shapiro	TV series (2 episodes)
1997	The Last Don	Ceil Ballazzo	TV mini series
1999	Pushing Tin	TV reporter	Movie
1999	Relic Hunter	Anna	TV series (1 episode "The Book of Love")
1999	Earth: Final Conflict	Vera Rizzori	TV series (2 episodes)
2000	In a Heartbeat	Dr. Jennifer Perino	TV series (2 episodes – Pilot 1 & 2)
2001, 2004	Doc	Brooke Fulton/Laura Hill	TV series (2 episodes)
2007	Love You To Death	Marcia	TV series (1 episode "The Bog Murder")
2009–2010	Cra$h & Burn	Teresa	TV series (7 episodes)
2010	The Conversation	Director	Short film by Laura Cassis
2010–2014	Degrassi: The Next Generation	Audra Torres	TV series
2012	The L.A. Complex	Tyson's mom	TV series (1 episode "Be a Man")
2014	Hemlock Grove	Brenda	TV series (Season 2, episode 4, "Bodily Fluids")
2015	Full Out	Susan Berlin	TV movie
2017	The Kennedys: After Camelot	Maria	TV miniseries
2017	The Good Witch	Mrs. Diaz	TV series (Season 3, episode 7, In Sickness and in Health
2018	Zombies	Cheer announcer #2	
2022	Something You Said Last Night	Mona	
2023	Sparks Over Brooklyn	Zia Elena	TV Movie
