= Camilla Scott =

Canadian actress (born 1961)

Camilla Eves
- Born: Camilla Scott; July 12, 1961 (age 64); Toronto, Ontario, Canada
- Occupations: Actress, television host
- Years active: 1990–present
- Spouse: Paul Eves
- Children: 1

Camilla Eves (born Camilla Scott, July 12, 1961) is a Canadian actress and television host.

== Career ==
Scott's first starring role was the lead in Evita at the Limelight Dinner Theatre, a role she landed before she turned 25. Because her agent insisted that her name be billed above the title of the musical in all advertising, "suddenly people thought I was a star", she said.

=== Television ===
She appeared on the soap opera, Days of Our Lives, in 1990, portraying Melissa Anderson. The casting director was looking for a young actress who could sing. Surprised by a request to "sing something," Scott started singing the last song she had heard on her car radio: Whitney Houston's "Greatest Love of All". The casting agent stopped her, saying, "You really can sing." After meeting with the producer, she was hired and began filming the next day. She remained on the series for two years.

Scott hosted The Camilla Scott Show on the Baton Broadcast System (and later the CTV television network), a daytime talk show, from 1996 to 1998. The show received a poor critical reception; the Globe and Mail wrote "What could be less fun than licking a metal pole on a January morning with a crazed Shitzu scrabbling up your pant leg? According to the mostly male TV critics of middling years who write for the papers, the answer is Camilla Scott."

Concurrent with her talk show work, she had a recurring role in the TV series Due South as Inspector Margaret "Meg" Thatcher of the Royal Canadian Mounted Police from 1995 through 1999. She credited this role for helping her receive an award for community safety from her cellphone company. In 1996, she witnessed a mugging and called 911, giving a description of the mugger and his car that led to the mugger being arrested and the stolen goods being recovered. "Maybe my role as an RCMP officer on Due South gave me the practice I needed to help in a real situation," she said.

In 2002, Scott had a voice role as Mama Bear in a television adaptation of the Berenstain Bears.

=== Theatre ===
Scott has performed in several Toronto musical theatre productions.

In 1994, Scott starred as Polly Baker in Mike Ockrent's Toronto production of George and Ira Gershwin's Crazy For You at the Royal Alexandra Theatre.

Scott appeared as the lead in the Toronto production of Mamma Mia! after Louise Pitre departed on tour. She continued in the role for three years.

She starred as Khashoggi, a role that previously had always been played by a man, in the Dora Award–winning Toronto production of the Queen musical We Will Rock You. She took the role in October 2008, and remained with the show until it closed on June 28, 2009.

=== Multi-level marketing ===
As her acting career wound down, Scott started working for Arbonne, a multi-level marketing company. As of 2020, she is now an Executive National Vice President for the company.

== Filmography ==
- Three Men and a Baby (1987)
- Due South (1994–1999)
- Tommy Boy (1995)
- The Art of the Steal (2013)

== Personal life ==
Scott married actor Paul Eves in 2002. They have a son born in 2005.
