= Paul Gross =

Canadian actor, producer, director and writer (born 1959)

Paul Gross OC
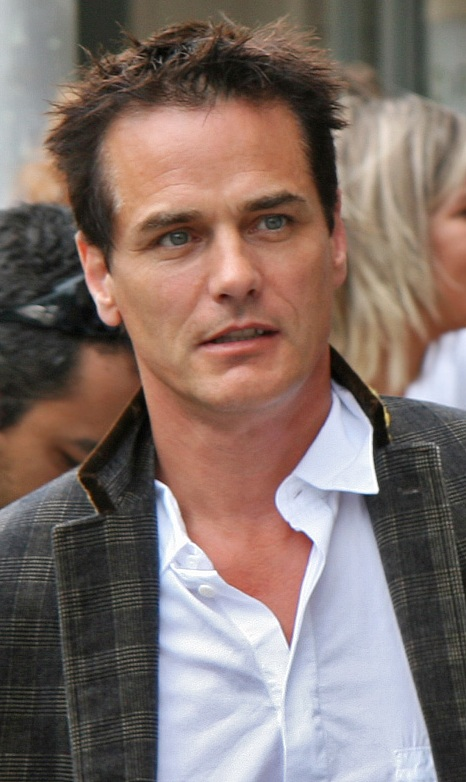
- Gross at the 2008 Toronto International Film Festival
- Born: Paul Michael Gross; April 30, 1959 (age 67); Calgary, Alberta, Canada
- Education: University of Alberta
- Occupations: Actor, director, writer, producer
- Years active: 1985–present
- Spouse: Martha Burns (m. 1988)
- Children: Jack Gross and Hannah Gross

Paul Michael Gross OC (born April 30, 1959) is a Canadian actor, film and television director, screenwriter, playwright, and producer. He rose to fame for his lead role as RCMP Constable Benton Fraser on the Canadian television series Due South (1994–1999). He won three Gemini Awards for his work on the series, two for acting and one for writing.

Gross subsequently had success with two other Canadian television series, Slings & Arrows and Republic of Doyle. He made his film directorial debut with the cult comedy Men with Brooms, which spawned a television series of the same name. He wrote, directed, produced, and starred in the 2008 war film Passchendaele, which won the Genie Award for Best Motion Picture.

At the 3rd Canadian Screen Awards in 2015, he received the Earle Grey Award for lifetime achievement. That same year, he was awarded the Order of Canada for “his contributions to Canadian film and television, as an actor, writer and director.”

== Early life ==
Gross was born in Calgary, Alberta, the son of Renie Gross (née Dunne), a writer and art historian of Irish descent, and Robert "Bob" Gross, a career soldier, colonel, and tank commander. His family moved to Arlington, Virginia, in his adolescence, where Gross attended Yorktown High School. He credits drama teacher Timothy Jecko as his inspiration for becoming an actor: "I'm not sure where I would have ended up otherwise."

== Career ==
Gross studied acting at the University of Alberta in Edmonton, but he left during the third year of his study. He went back later to complete the half-credit needed to receive his fine arts degree. He appeared in several stage productions, such as Hamlet and Romeo and Juliet. Other productions in which he appeared include Observe the Sons of Ulster Marching Towards the Somme and As You Like It. His student work The Deer and the Antelope Play was co-produced by the university's department of drama and Theatre Network, and won both the Clifford E. Lee National Playwriting Award and the Alberta Culture Playwriting Award.

After the play Successful Strangers, Gross starred in his first movie, Turning to Stone.

He wrote and directed the curling movie Men with Brooms. Gross starred in the television series Slings & Arrows from 2003 to 2006 alongside his wife Martha Burns, which The A.V. Club called "one of TV's greatest shows".

In 2008, he attracted widespread attention in Canada when he wrote, co-produced, directed, and starred in the Genie Award-winning film Passchendaele, inspired by stories he heard from his grandfather, a First World War soldier. The film had its premiere at the 2008 Toronto International Film Festival on September 4, 2008, when it also had the honour of opening the festival. The film received a mixed reception upon release. Despite this, it won several awards; namely five awards at the 29th Genie Awards, including Best Picture, and the Golden Reel Award for Canada's top-grossing film of 2008. On March 2, 2009, Paul Gross was honoured for his film Passchendaele, winning that year's National Arts Centre Award for achievement over the past performance year.

From September 16, 2011, he appeared in a production of Noël Coward's Private Lives in Toronto co-starring Kim Cattrall (the production ended October 30, 2011); the production moved to Broadway where it opened November 6 and closed on December 31, 2011. That year, he also produced a feature film with Akshay Kumar called Breakaway starring Camilla Belle and Vinay Virmani.

Between 2011 and 2014, he appeared in nine episodes as Kevin Crocker on Republic of Doyle.

More recently, Gross completed work on the contemporary war drama Hyena Road, released on October 9, 2015.

Gross starred in the title role of King Lear during the 2023 season of the Stratford Festival.

=== Due South ===
His role as upright Royal Canadian Mounted Police officer Benton Fraser in the Due South television series (1994–1999) brought him increased recognition. Like fellow actor David Marciano, he didn't want to do the show at first, and creator Paul Haggis didn't even know if he wanted Gross for the role, but following a meeting, he was cast as Constable Benton Fraser.

When Due South was revived for the third season, Gross returned in the role of Benton Fraser. He also took on duties as executive producer and writer. He earned an estimated salary of CA$2–3 million per season, and at the time was the highest-paid performer in Canadian television history. He wrote several episodes of the last season of the series. His favourite episodes include "Gift of the Wheelman" and "All the Queen's Horses", and his episodes "Mountie on the Bounty" and "Call of the Wild" are of a similar style.

== Personal life ==
In September 1988, Gross married Canadian actress Martha Burns. The couple have two children: Hannah Gross, who is also an actress, and Jack Gross.

== Theatre ==
Year	Title	Role	Theatre
1981	As You Like It	Adam	Northern Light Theatre, Edmonton
1981	A Midsummer Night's Dream	Lysander	Northern Light Theatre, Edmonton
1982–1983	Mrs. Warren's Profession	Frank Gardner	Theatre Calgary
1982–1983	Unseen Hand		Theatre Calgary
1982–1983	Farther West		Theatre Calgary
1982–1983	Walsh	Clarence Underhill	National Arts Centre, Ottawa
1982–1983	The Kite	Motherwell	Festival Lennoxville
1982–1983	Take Me Where the Water Is Warm		Festival Lennoxville
1982–1983	In the Jungle of Cities	George Gaga	Festival Lennoxville
1984	Successful Strangers	Dorante	Centaur Theatre, Montréal
1984	Romeo and Juliet	Romeo	Toronto Free Theatre, Toronto
1988	Observe the Sons of Ulster Marching Towards the Somme	Young Kenneth Pyper	Centrestage Co., Toronto
1989	Cat on a Hot Tin Roof	Brick	Manitoba Theatre Centre, Winnipeg
2000	Hamlet	Hamlet	Stratford Festival of Canada
2011	Private Lives	Elyot	Royal Alexandra Theatre, Music Box Theatre
2012	Are You There, McPhee?	Edmund Gowery	McCarter Theatre, New Jersey
2015	Domesticated	Bill Pulver	Berkeley St. Theatre, co-production between The Company Theatre and Canadian Stage
2020	Keene	James Wallack	Red Bull Theatre N.Y.
2023	King Lear	Lear	Stratford Festival
2024	The Seafarer	Lockhart	Alberta Theatre Projects
2025	Who's Afraid of Virginia Woolf?	George	Bluma Appel Theatre
2025	Good Night, and Good Luck	William S. Paley	Winter Garden Theatre
2026	Waiting for Godot	Vladimir	Stratford Festival

== Filmography ==
=== Films ===
Year	Title	Role	Notes
1989	Cold Comfort	Stephen Miller	
1989	Divided Loyalties	Walter Butler	
1991	Married to It	Jeremy Brimfield	
1992	Buried on Sunday	Augustus Knickel	
1993	Aspen Extreme	T.J. Burke	
1994	Whale Music	Daniel Howl	
1994	Paint Cans	Morton Ridgewell	
2002	Men with Brooms	Chris Cutter	Also writer and director
2004	Wilby Wonderful	Buddy French	
2008	Passchendaele	Michael Dunne	Also writer, producer and director
2010	Gunless	The Montana Kid	
2010	Barney's Version	Constable O'Malley of the North	
2010	Hot Water	Man	Video
2011	Speedy Singhs		Producer
2015	Hyena Road	Pete Mitchell	Also writer, producer and director
2015	Beeba Boys	Jamie	
2018	The Parting Glass	Sean	
2020	Falling	Dr. Solvei	
2021	The Middle Man	The Sheriff	
2025	The Fallers	Carl	

=== Television ===
Year	Title	Role	Notes
1986	Turning to Stone	Billy	Debut; television film
1986	Airwaves		Writer
1988	Chasing Rainbows	Jake Kincaid	14 episodes
1989	Street Legal	Steven Hines	2 episodes
1990	The Ray Bradbury Theater	Skip	1 episode
1990	Getting Married in Buffalo Jump	Alex Bresnyachuk	Television film
1993	Gross Misconduct: The Life of Brian Spencer		Writer
1993	Armistead Maupin's Tales of the City	Brian Hawkins	6 episodes
1994	XXX's & OOO's	Bucky Dean	Television film
1994–1999	Due South	Constable Benton Fraser	67 episodes
1996–1998	The Red Green Show	Kevin Black	5 episodes
1997	Noel's House Party	Himself	1 episode
1997	20,000 Leagues Under the Sea	Ned Land	Television film
1999	Murder Most Likely	Patrick Kelly	Television film
2003–2005	The Eleventh Hour	Tony Joel	2 episodes
2003–2006	Slings & Arrows	Geoffrey Tennant	18 episodes
2004	H_{2}O: The Last Prime Minister	Thomas David McLaughlin	Also writer and executive producer
2004	Monday Report	Thomas David McLaughlin	Episode #2.3
2005	Burnt Toast	Scott	Television film
2006	Prairie Giant: The Tommy Douglas Story	John Diefenbaker	2 episodes
2006	Hockey: A People's History	Narrator	10 episodes
2008	The Trojan Horse	Thomas David McLaughlin	Also writer and executive producer
2009–2010	Eastwick	Darryl Van Horne	Regular; 12 episodes
2010	Men with Brooms	Chris Cutter	12 episodes
2011–2014	Republic of Doyle	Kevin Crocker	9 episodes
2017	Alias Grace	Thomas Kinnear	4 episodes
2018	Caught	Roy Patterson	Miniseries; 5 episodes
2019	Tales of the City	Brian Hawkins	Main cast; 9 episodes
2021	Y: The Last Man	President Ted Campbell	2 episodes
2026	Saint Pierre	Benoit Lévesque	2 episodes
2027	Heated Rivalry	Commissioner Roger Crowell	(filming as of late 2026)

== Discography ==
=== Albums ===
Year	Album
1997	Two Houses (with David Keeley)
2001	Love and Carnage (with David Keeley) (first released as Give the Dog a Bone)

=== Singles ===
Year	Single	CAN Country	Album
1997	"Voodoo"		Two Houses (with David Keeley)
1998	"32 Down on the Robert MacKenzie"		Two Houses (with David Keeley)
1999	"Papa's Front Porch"	61	Two Houses (with David Keeley)
2000	"Ride Forever"		Two Houses (with David Keeley)

== Honours ==

Ribbon	Description	Notes
	Officer of the Order of Canada (O.C.)	Awarded on May 2, 2013; Invested on February 13, 2015
	Queen Elizabeth II Diamond Jubilee Medal for Canada	2012

== Awards ==
Year	Award	Category	Film/Play	Result
1981	Alberta Culture competition	New Play	The Deer and the Antelope Play	Won
1982	Clifford E. Lee Foundation	National Award for Playwrights	The Deer and the Antelope Play	Won
1982	Alberta Culture competition	New Play	The Dead of Winter	Won
1985	Dora Award	Best Performance	Romeo and Juliet	Nominated
1986	Gemini Award	Best Writing in a TV Drama	In This Corner	Nominated
1988	Dora Award	Outstanding Performance by a Male in a Featured Role	Observe the Sons of Ulster Marching Toward the Somme	Won
1994	Gemini Award	Best Writing in a Dramatic Program or Mini-Series	Gross Misconduct	Nominated
1995	Gemini Award	Best Performance by an Actor in a Continuing Leading Dramatic Role	Due South	Won
1996	Gemini Award	Best Performance by an Actor in a Continuing Leading Dramatic Role	Due South	Won
1997	Gemini Award	Best Writing in a Dramatic Series	Due South	Nominated (with Paul Quarrington, John Krizanc)
1998	Gemini Award	Best Writing in a Dramatic Series	Due South	Won (with John Krizanc, R.B. Carney – Mountie on the Bounty, part 2)
1998	Gemini Award	Best Dramatic Series	Due South	Nominated (with Frank Siracusa, Peter Bray, R.B. Carney, George Bloomfield)
1998	Gemini Award	Best Performance by an Actor in a Continuing Leading Dramatic Role	Due South	Nominated
1998	Gemini Award	Best Writing in a Dramatic Series	Due South	Nominated (with R.B. Carney, John Krizanc – Mountie on the Bounty, part 1)
1998	Gemini Award	Best Writing in a Dramatic Series	Due South	Nominated (Burning Down the House)
1999	Gemini Award	Canada's Choice Award	Due South	Won (with Frank Siracusa, David Cole, R.B. Carney)
1999	Gemini Award	Best Performance by an Actor in a Continuing Leading Dramatic Role	Due South	Nominated
2000	Gemini Award	Best Performance by an Actor in a Leading Role in a Dramatic Program or Mini-Series	Murder Most Likely	Nominated
2000	Gemini Award	Best TV Movie or Dramatic Mini-Series	Murder Most Likely	Nominated (with R.B. Carney, Frank Siracusa, Robert Forsyth, Anne Marie La Traverse)
2003	Canadian Comedy Award	Pretty Funny Direction	Men With Brooms	Won
2003	Canadian Comedy Award	Pretty Funny Male Performance	Men With Brooms	Nominated
2003	Canadian Comedy Award	Pretty Funny Writing	Men With Brooms	Nominated (with John Krizanc)
2003	Genie Award	Best Original Screenplay	Men With Brooms	Nominated (with John Krizanc)
2004	Gemini Award	Best Performance by an Actor in a Continuing Leading Dramatic Role	Slings & Arrows	Won
2005	ACTRA Toronto	Award Of Excellence		Won
2005	Writers Guild of Canada	Movie of the Week and/or Mini-Series	H_{2}O	Won (with John Krizanc)
2005	Directors Guild of Canada	Outstanding Team Achievement in a Television Movie or Mini-Series	H_{2}O	Won
2005	Gemini Award	Best Dramatic Mini-Series	H_{2}O	Nominated (with Frank Siracusa)
2005	Gemini Award	Best Writing in a Dramatic Program or Mini-Series	H_{2}O	Nominated (with John Krizanc)
2005	Monte Carlo Television Festival	Best Performance by an Actor in a Mini-Series	H_{2}O	Won
2007	Gemini Award	Best Actor in a Continuing Leading Dramatic Role	Slings & Arrows	Won
2008	Gemini Award	Best Writing in a Dramatic Program or Mini-Series	The Trojan Horse	Nominated (with John Krizanc)
2009	Genie Award	Best Motion Picture	Passchendaele	Won (with Niv Fichman, Francis Damberger and Frank Siracusa)
2009	Genie Award	Golden Reel Award	Passchendaele	Won (with Niv Fichman, Francis Damberger and Frank Siracusa)
2009	Genie Award	Best Performance by an Actor in a Leading Role	Passchendaele	Nominated
2009	NBC Universal Canada	Award of Distinction		Won
2009	The Governor General's performing arts awards	National Arts Centre Award: Exceptional Achievement over the Past Performance Year		Won
2009	Directors Guild of Canada	Team Feature Film	Passchendaele	Won
2009	National History Society	Pierre Berton Award	Passchendaele	Won
(Sources: Paul Gross website)
