= David Marciano =

American actor (born 1960)

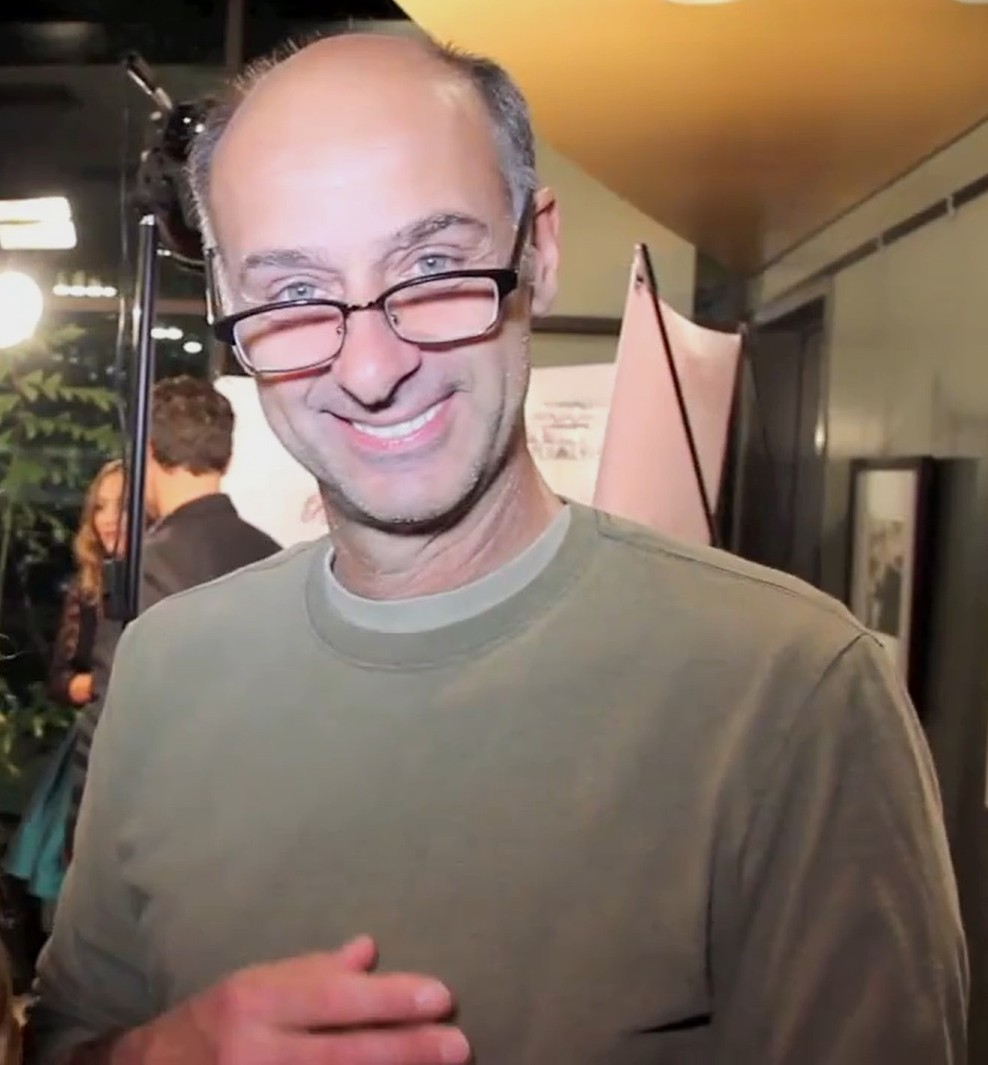
- Marciano in 2012
- Born: January 7, 1960 (age 66); Newark, New Jersey, U.S.
- Occupation: Actor
- Years active: 1985–present
- Television: Due South; The Shield; Homeland

David Marciano (born January 7, 1960, in Newark, New Jersey) is an American actor best known for his roles as: Jeffery in Civil Wars (1991–1993), Detective Raymond Vecchio in the television series Due South, Detective Steve Billings in the FX police drama The Shield, Virgil in Homeland (2011–2013), Brad in Bosch (2016–2020) and Howard in Shooter (2016–2017).

== Career ==
In 1985, Marciano moved to California where he studied acting at the Drama Studio London in Berkeley, earning a living by working as a bartender. His big break came two years later as a guest star in Wiseguy, playing a mobster impersonating Lorenzo Steelgrave. In 1989, he played the diner owner Stanley in Pepsi's 'Diner' commercial shown in the UK.

More small parts followed, including Cop #1 in the film Lethal Weapon 2, before he played the role of bicycle messenger/poet Jeffrey Lassick in legal drama Civil Wars from 1991–1993. He was then cast as Detective Raymond Vecchio in Due South in 1994. He played the part for two seasons before his character was replaced by Detective Stanley Kowalski (Callum Keith Rennie), due to filming commitments. He returned for the series finale in 1999 where Vecchio and Kowalski's ex-wife got together. He then appeared in the 1996 season 3 episode of Touched By An Angel entitled "Into The Light", playing a dying man in need of a heart transplant. Later he took the role of Giorgio Clericuzio in the 1997 mini-series of Mario Puzo's The Last Don.

He has appeared in episodes of various TV shows, including: Diagnosis: Murder, Midnight Caller, Judging Amy, Nash Bridges, JAG, The Division, NYPD Blue, NCIS, CSI: New York and CSI: Crime Scene Investigation and SeaQuest DSV.

Between 2005–2008, he played Detective Steve Billings in The Shield. Since then, he has appeared in episodes of: Joan of Arcadia, House, Lie to Me, Sons of Anarchy, and Battle Creek. Between 2011 and 2013, he played the recurring role of Virgil in Homeland.

In 2015-2016, Marciano played recurring roles in the Amazon original series Bosch and Syfy's 12 Monkeys. Most recently, he has been cast in a pilot for USA Network's Shooter.

== Filmography ==
=== Film ===
Year	Title	Role	Notes
1988	Hellbent	Mr. Tanas	
1989	Lethal Weapon 2	Cop #1	
1989	Harlem Nights	Tony	
1999	Dark Spiral	A.D.	
2004	Around the Bend	Detective	
2006	Chicken Man	Man	Short film
2006	Dark Mind	Announcer	
2009	Caught in the Middle	D.A. Henry Giles	Short film
2010	Contract	David Jackson	Short film
2011	Red State	Agent Eccles	
2011	Few Options, All Bad	Russ	
2012	3, 2, 1... Frankie Go Boom	David	
2014	Lost Angels	Harold (Director)	
2014	Tiny Detectives	Chief of Police	Short film
2014	Happy Anniversary Honey	Jack	Short film
2015	Thick Skin Required	Drew	Short film
2017	Take the Reins	Mr. Brown	Short film
2023	Ezra	Detective Harrelson	

=== Television ===
Year	Title	Role	Notes
1987	The Bold and the Beautiful	Punk #1	Episode: #1.80
1987	Wiseguy	Lorenzo Steelgrave	Episode: "The Loose Cannon"
1988	Duet	Geneva's Ex	Episode: "The Package"
1988	Sonny Spoon	Insane Wayne Bataglia	Episode: "Wizard of Odds"
1988	China Beach	Dee Jay	Episode: "Somewhere Over the Radio"
1988	Vietnam War Story	Calvin	Episode: "The Fragging"
1988	CBS Summer Playhouse	Sal Bernadini	Episode: "Tickets, Please"
1988	Street of Dreams	Bando	TV movie
1988	Police Story: Gladiator School	Monte Fontaine	TV movie
1988	Superboy	Hugo Stone	Episode: "The Beast and Beauty"
1989	Kiss Shot	Rick Powell	TV movie
1990	Midnight Caller	Jerry Bones	Episode: "Three for the Money"
1990	Maverick Square	No Luck Sal	TV movie
1991	The 100 Lives of Black Jack Savage	Hancock	Episode: "A Day in the Life of Logan Murphy"
1991–1993	Civil Wars	Jeffrey Lassick	Main cast
1993	Reasonable Doubts	Billy Gordon	Episode: "Trust Me on This"
1993	Gypsy	Pastey	TV movie
1994	SeaQuest 2032	Mack Stumpp	Episode: "Greed for a Pirate's Dream"
1994–1999	Due South	Det. Raymond Vecchio	Main cast (seasons 1–2), Guest star (seasons 3–4)
1994	Eyes of Terror	Kenneth Burch	TV movie
1996	Touched by an Angel	James Block	Episode: "Into the Light"
1997	The Last Don	Giorgio Clericuzio	Miniseries
1998	The Last Don II	Giorgio Clericuzio	Miniseries
1999	Diagnosis: Murder	Eddie Michaels	Episode: "Gangland"
1999	Kilroy	Carl	TV movie
2000–2001	Judging Amy	Len Mildmay	7 episodes
2000	Nash Bridges	Jimmy Bangs	Episode: "Rock and a Hard Place"
2001	The Lot		Episode: "Kids"
2001	Providence	George	2 episodes
2002	JAG	Senior Chief Sinclair	Episode: "In Thin Air"
2002	The Mind of the Married Man	Dr. Paul Gianni	4 episodes
2003	The Division		Episode: "Murder.com"
2003	NYPD Blue	Det. Raymond Gerson	Episode: "And the Wenner Is..."
2004	CSI: Crime Scene Investigation	Frank Samuels	Episode: "XX"
2004	CSI: New York	Karl Drewdetski	Episode: "Creatures of the Night"
2004	NCIS	Bartender	Episode: "Lt. Jane Doe"
2005	Eyes	Terry Laguna	Episode: "Pilot"
2005	Joan of Arcadia	Edmond Dodds	Episode: "Common Thread"
2005–2008	The Shield	Steve Billings	Recurring (seasons 4–6), Main cast (season 7)
2009	House	Murphy	Episode: "The Tyrant"
2010	Lie to Me	Jason Wilkie	Episode: "Pied Piper"
2010	Sons of Anarchy	Chicken Man	Episode: "Turning and Turning"
2011	Criminal Minds: Suspect Behavior	Det. Brigman	Episode: "Jane"
2011	It's Always Sunny in Philadelphia	Detective Larson	Episode: "The ANTI-Social Network"
2011–2013	Homeland	Virgil	Recurring role (seasons 1 & 3), Main cast (season 2)
2012	Blue-Eyed Butcher	Detective	TV movie
2013	Law & Order: Special Victims Unit	Rick Purcell	Episode: "Legitimate Rape"
2014	Intelligence	Gordon Greyson	Episode: "Size Matters"
2014	Castle	Bill Garrett	Episode: "Meme Is Murder"
2015	Battle Creek	Donny Patton	Episode: "Stockholm"
2016–2020	Bosch	Brad Conniff	Recurring role (seasons 2–3, 5–6)
2016	12 Monkeys	Detective Damato	Episode: "Immortal"
2016–2017	Shooter	Howard Utey / John Renlow	8 episodes
2019, 2021	S.W.A.T.	Steve Billings	Episodes: "Trigger Creep" and "Whistleblower"

== Awards ==
Year	Award	Category	Work	Result
1995	Gemini Award	Best Performance by an Actor in a Continuing Leading Dramatic Role	Due South	Nominated
1996	Gemini Award	Best Performance by an Actor in a Continuing Leading Dramatic Role	Due South	Nominated
2013	Screen Actors Guild Award	Outstanding Performance by an Ensemble in a Drama Series	Homeland	Nominated (with Season 1 ensemble)
