= Paul Quarrington =

Canadian writer, filmmaker and musician (1953–2010)

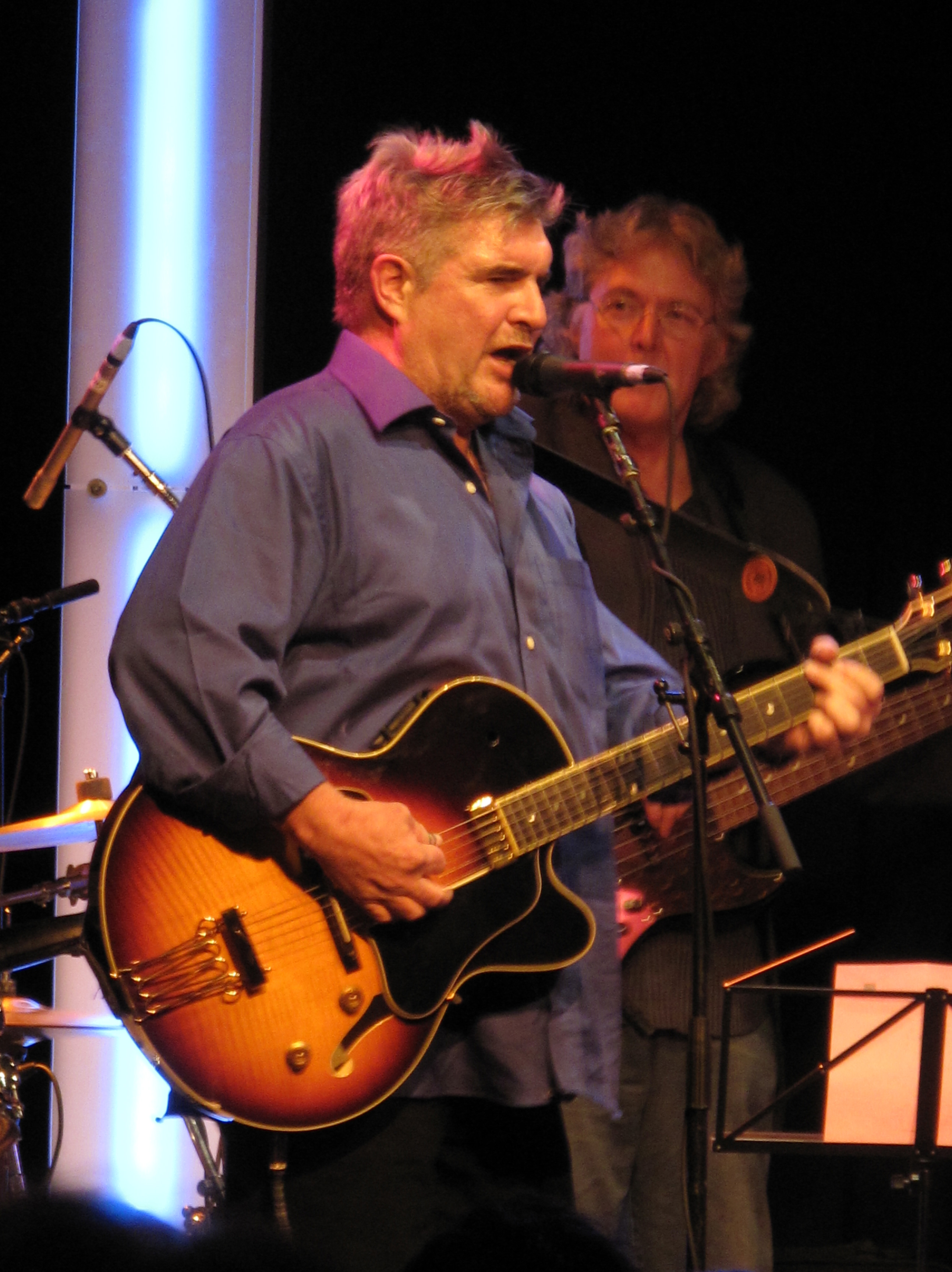
- Born: July 22, 1953; Toronto, Ontario, Canada
- Died: January 21, 2010 (aged 56); Toronto, Ontario, Canada
- Occupations: Novelist, playwright, screenwriter, filmmaker, musician, educator
- Writing career
- Genre: Humour
- Notable works: Whale Music, King Leary, The Ravine (novel)
- Notable awards: 1989 Governor General's Award for Fiction for Whale Music and winner of the 1988 Stephen Leacock Award for King Leary

Paul Lewis Quarrington (July 22, 1953 – January 21, 2010) was a Canadian novelist, playwright, screenwriter, filmmaker, musician, and educator.

== Background ==
Born in Toronto as the middle of three sons in the family of four of Bruce Quarrington, he was raised in the district of Don Mills and studied at the University of Toronto but dropped out after less than two years of study.

He wrote his early novels while working as the bass player for the group Joe Hall and the Continental Drift and as the guitar accompanist for Cathy Stewart, a Canadian singer who was popular at the time. One of his novels, Whale Music, was called "the greatest rock'n'roll novel ever written" by Penthouse magazine. His non-fiction books and journalism were also highly regarded – he was nominated for fifteen National Magazine Awards, earning or co-earning four gold and one silver.

Quarrington's most consistent musical colleague has been Martin Worthy; their friendship began in high school. He was also a high school friend of songwriter Dan Hill, with whom he reunited toward the end of his life to collaborate on musical projects. Quarrington collaborated with many artists (a defining element of his overall body of work) who achieved recognition in their respective disciplines. These include Nino Ricci, Joseph Kertes, Dave Bidini, Jake MacDonald, John Krizanc, Christina Jennings, Judith Keenan, Michael Burke, Peter Lynch, Ron Mann, Robert Lantos and many others.

Between the publication of his first and second novels, Quarrington also competed in the 1981 Three-Day Novel Contest, writing an unpublished manuscript called The Man Who Liked to Fall in Love.

== Novels ==
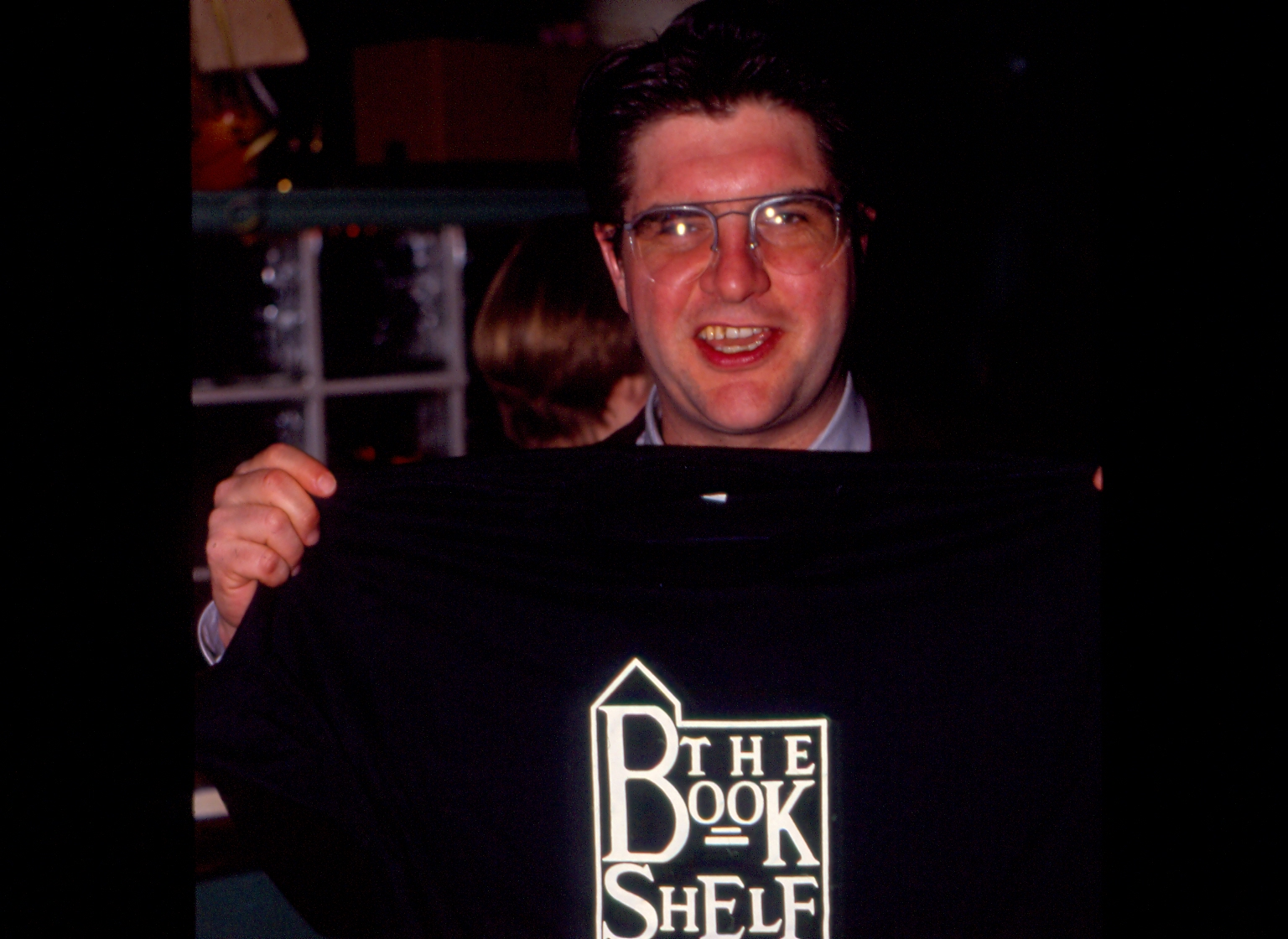
Paul Quarrington (circa 1991)

Quarrington's novels are characterized by their humour (King Leary received the Stephen Leacock Award for Humour in 1988), although they address serious subjects; reviews of his writing have often noted that his books regularly contain elements of both tragedy and comedy. During the promotional push for his 2008 novel The Ravine, Anne Collins, his longtime editor at Random House Canada, told Quill & Quire that "Paul uses a comic approach to deal with incredibly sad and troubling and tragic material."

His protagonists are often faded former celebrities in the worlds of sports, music or film, emotionally crippled antiheroes whose personal demons have led them to withdraw from society. Typically, in Quarrington's work, an outside agent of some sort – a young woman in Whale Music, ghosts in King Leary, a hurricane in Galveston, an overtime hockey game in Logan in Overtime – challenges the structures of the protagonist's life and sets them on a path to moral, spiritual and personal redemption.

His novel The Ravine was published in March 2008. At the time of his death, Quarrington had completed a short film adaptation of the work (Pavane, 2008) and was collaborating on a television series adaptation of that novel, which he claimed to be semi-autobiographical. "It's about a writer who squanders his talents in television, drinks too much, screws around and ruins his marriage," Quarrington has said. "The reason it's 'semi-autobiographical' is the guy's name is 'Phil.'"

=== Influences ===
During his time, Quarrington has been an influential figure in Canadian literature, not only as an author, but also through his participation in teaching (Humber College and University of Toronto), publishing circles, organizations and events. He befriended many Canadian writers, including Timothy Findley. Quarrington and Findley held a mutual admiration for each other; when asked to provide a review quote for Home Game, Findley blurbed that Quarrington was "an extraordinary writer with a rare gift for pulling unique characters out of funny hats".

As a youngster, Quarrington came from a very musical background, and this showed consistently in his writing. Although most of Quarrington's biggest successes were as a writer, he reportedly considered himself a musician who also wrote rather than a writer who also made music.

While writing a review blurb for Leonard Cohen's book, The Favourite Game, he admired Cohen's "poetic craftsmanship." Another time, in typical whimsical Quarrington fashion, he declared, "I seem to like authors named John – John Fowles, John Gardner, John Irving. John Gardner is my favourite – he's sadly not so well known these days."

== Cinema and television ==
Quarrington's film adaptation of Whale Music, cowritten with director Richard J. Lewis, was nominated for numerous Genie Awards, including Best Picture and Best Adapted Screenplay, in 1994. Actor Maury Chaykin won best actor for his portrayal of the drug-addled Desmond Howl.

He won the Genie Award for Best Original Screenplay in 1991 for Perfectly Normal, a comedy that combined ice hockey and grand opera. Perfectly Normal opened the Toronto International Film Festival, at that time called Festival of Festivals, in 1990.

Quarrington has also worked in the television industry, acting as writer and/or producer on such shows as Due South, Power Play and Moose TV, the latter winning Best Comedy from the CFTPA Indie Awards 2008.

== Stage ==
Quarrington's work for the stage includes Dying is Easy, The Invention of Poetry, Three Ways from Sunday and Checkout Time. He was a long-time board member of the Toronto Fringe Festival.

== Music ==
In their teens, Quarrington and Hill also occasionally performed together as a folk music duo, billed as Quarrington/Hill. Hill had also auditioned for Quarrington's garage band PQ's People.

Quarrington/Worthy, a duo with musician Martin Worthy, had a #1 hit on RPM's Adult Contemporary charts the week of January 12, 1980 with their song "Baby and the Blues".

Quarrington collaborated with the band Rheostatics on the Whale Music film soundtrack, including a songwriting credit on the band's most successful hit single, "Claire".

Quarrington was also the lead singer/guitarist for the blues/roots/country ensemble Porkbelly Futures. Their first CD, Way Past Midnight was released in late 2005 by Wildflower Records, and spent six months on the "Americana" charts. Their second CD, Porkbelly Futures, was released by Cordova Bay Records in April 2008. It contains many of Quarrington's original compositions. His songwriting was also featured on the last CD put out by Porkbelly Futures, titled The Crooked Road which was recorded and released after his death, and features a photograph of Quarrington on the back cover. Quarrington's solo CD called The Songs was recorded just prior to his death and was released posthumously in June 2010, also on Cordova Bay Records.

He participated in the collaborative "Canadian Songbook" tour in 2008 with Murray McLauchlan, Stephen Fearing, and Catherine MacLellan.

== Final months ==
After being diagnosed with lung cancer in May 2009, Quarrington continued his plans to embark on various concert tours with Porkbelly Futures, while continuing to produce his own solo CD and the Porkbellys third release; complete his non-fiction memoir Cigar Box Banjo: Notes on Life and Music (Greystone Books, May 2010), deliver multiple screenplays for episodes of a television series for Shaftesbury Films (Notes on Euphoria, dir. John L'Ecuyer) as well as star in a documentary film initiated by friend and colleague Judith Keenan; the film, Paul Quarrington: Life in Music, is an adaptation tied to his written memoir.

Rheostatics, who had broken up in 2007, reunited for a live tribute show to Quarrington produced by Humber College for Toronto's International Festival of Authors. Also appearing to celebrate his body of work in multiple genres were Christina Jennings, John Krizanc, Michael Burns, Wayson Choy, Nino Ricci, Paul Gross, Alistair McLeod, Joe Hall, Porkbelly Futures with David Gray, and talented family members Christine Quarrington, Tony Quarrington and Joel Quarrington. Michael Burke announced the launch of Quarrington Arts Society / Société des Arts Quarrington, to provide support for working and emerging artists committed to multi-disciplinary practices.

Quarrington's final collaboration with Hill and Worthy, a song about his journey with cancer called "Are You Ready", was completed just ten days before Quarrington's death. The song was conceived by Quarrington and film producer Keenan as the focal point for their feature documentary. Many other songs were also conceived and produced by Quarrington during this fertile creative time, including "All the Stars" (created just days after the diagnosis) and "Wherever You Go," all of which are included on the posthumously released CD.

Quarrington died of lung cancer in Toronto on January 21, 2010, aged 56. His final book, a memoir titled Cigar Box Banjo: Notes on Music and Life, was posthumously published later the same year. He wrote a short story, "The Conversion" which he recited with music some time before his death. That recitation was presented on radio by the CBC Radio show Tapestry.

== Awards ==
King Leary won the Stephen Leacock Award in 1988, and Whale Music won the 1989 Governor General's Award for Fiction. Quarrington was also nominated for the Leacock Award in 1984 for Home Game, in 1986 for The Life of Hope, in 1990 for Whale Music and in 1998 for The Boy on the Back of the Turtle.

Galveston, published in the United States as Storm Chasers, was nominated for the prestigious Giller Prize. He lost to Alice Munro – which, Quarrington stated afterward, "was hard to feel upset about. It's like losing to Chekhov."

In February 2008, King Leary was put forward by Dave Bidini as one of the five books considered on CBC Radio's Canada Reads. Bidini ultimately prevailed, and King Leary was named the book that everyone in the nation should read.

His short film Pavane, adapted from his novel The Ravine, garnered a Remi Platinum Award Houston's WorldFest, was juried in several other US festivals, and was broadcast in Canada on Bravo!FACT Presents and CBC Television's Canadian Reflections. He and the creative team for ShowCase earned the CFPTA Indie Award for Comedy for the series Moose TV.

In 2009, the Writers' Trust of Canada awarded Quarrington its Matt Cohen Prize for a distinguished lifetime contribution to Canadian literature.

On June 10, 2010, Quarrington was posthumously awarded an honorary Doctorate of Letters by Nipissing University. His daughter Carson accepted the award on his behalf.

In 2014, the city of Toronto named an ice rink and water feature in Sherbourne Common after Quarrington.

== Bibliography ==
=== Novels ===
- The Service (1978)
- Home Game (1983)
- The Life of Hope (1985)
- King Leary (1987)
- Whale Music (1989)
- Logan in Overtime (1990)
- Civilization (1994)
- The Spirit Cabinet (1999)
- Galveston (2004)
- The Ravine (2008)

=== Non-fiction ===
- Hometown Heroes: On the Road with Canada's National Hockey Team (1988)
- Fishing with my Old Guy (1995)
- Original Six: True Stories From Hockey's Classic Era (1996)
- The Boy on the Back of the Turtle (1997)
- Fishing for Brookies, Browns and Bows: The Old Guy's Complete Guide to Catching Trout (2001)
- From the Far Side of the River (2003)
- Cigar Box Banjo: Notes on Music and Life (2010)

=== Drama ===
- The Second (1990)
- The Invention of Poetry (1989)
- So You Think You're Mozart (1991)
- Checkout Time (1996)
- Dying is Easy (1997)
- Heart in a Bottle (2001)
- Three Ways from Sunday (2007)

=== Edited work ===
- 1989 Leacock Limerick Awards Collection (1990)

== Selected filmography ==
=== Short films ===
- A Man's Life
- Mann Over Moon
- Mump and Smoot in the Princess Who Wouldn't Smile
- Angel Takes All: No Limit Texas Hold 'Em (2006)
- Pavane (2008)
- Seventh Seal (2010)

=== Feature film screenplays ===
- Perfectly Normal (1990)
- Giant Steps (1992)
- Whale Music (1994)
- Camilla (1994)
- Men with Brooms (2002)
- Vulnerable (2010)

=== Television writing ===
- Due South
- John Woo's Once a Thief
- Power Play
- Tom Stone
- Chilly Beach
- 1-800-MISSING
- Moose TV
- Men with Brooms
- The Don Cherry Story
- Puck Hogs
