= Striped Entertainment =

American film distributor

- Industry: Book Publishing; Motion Pictures; Entertainment
- Founded: 2012
- Headquarters: New York City, USA
- Website: stripedentertainment.com

Striped Entertainment is an American independent publisher, film distributor, and international sales company. The company was formed in 2012 and specializes in foreign and independent films.

One of the first films distributed by Striped Entertainment was the Scottish chiller Graders, which was wrongly reported to be in part based on a real life criminal case but in fact was totally fictional.

The first theatrical release was the feature film Brief Reunion, directed by John Daschbach.

== Films ==
Title	Year	Country	Category	Director	Main cast
Freddy Hotel	2014	Italy	feature	Massimiliano Amato	Delphine Sartiaux, Giulia Morgani, Maria Cristina Blu, Nicola Garofalo
Kolumpo	2013	Malaysia	feature	Rozi Izma, Sheikh Munasar, Bront Palarae	Amirul Ariff, Azad Jasmin, Mano Maniam, Nell Ng, Ruminah Sidek, Sharifah Amani, Soffi Jikan
Bloom	2012	Thailand	feature	Fa Poonvoralak	Amirul Ariff, Azad Jasmin, Mano Maniam, Nell Ng, Ruminah Sidek, Sharifah Amani, Soffi Jikan
Dating A Zombie	2012	US	feature	Jack Abele	Lisa Soprano, Jack Abele, Lora Lee Ecobelli
Kosmonavtika	2012	Russia	feature	Maxim Trovimof	Georgiy Teslya-Gerasimov, Marina Konyashkina, Tagir Rakhimov
Lost Loves	2012	Cambodia	feature	Chhay Bora	Chin Neak, Kauv Sotheary, Nhem Sopheak, Pok Marineth
Odd One Out (Nie ten Czlowiek)	2012	UK	feature	Pawel Wendorff	Bartek Topa, Bartosz Turzinski, Gabriela Muskala, Jan Frycz, Krystztof Globisz, Leslaw Zurek, Piotr Adamczyk, Wojciech Psoniak
Ham and the Piper	2012	UK	feature	Mark Norfolk	Jeffery Kissoon, Jennifer Guy
The Yellow Pill	2014	Singapore	feature	Mikael Teo	Scott Burden, Tristan Goh, Yi Zeng
The First	2014	US	feature	Jacobo Rispa	Vivi Pineda, Eva Tamargo, Manuel Uriza, Joss Waleska
The Last Day Of August	2013	US	feature	Craig DiFolco	Sebastian Arcelus, Michael Izquierdo, Heather Lind, Vanessa Ray
Graders	2012	UK	feature	David Hutchison	Joanna Kaczynska, Greg Drysdale, Agnieszka Bresler
Take Me To Dinner	2014	Malaysia	feature	Gavin Yap	Ben Tan, Ka Hong Thor, Michael Chen, Patrick Teoh, Susan Lankester, U-En NG
La Rizière (The Rice Paddy)	2010	France	feature	Xiaoling Zhu	Yang Yingqiu, O. Xuexin, Yang Xiaoyuan
Brief Reunion	2011	US	feature	John Daschbach	Joel de la Fuente, Alexie Gilmore, Scott Shepherd, Francie Swift
The Sad Cafe	2012	US	feature	Bennie Woodell	Bradley Fowler, Katie Lanigan
Indigo Children	2012	US	feature	Eric Chaney	Robert Olsen, Isabelle McNally, Christine Donlon
The Last Road	2012	UK	feature	John Wheeler	Aaron Long, Laure Marklew
Cold Blood	2012	UK	feature	Mumtaz Yildirimlar	Lily Brown, Alina-Jane Lovell, James Tweedy, Judson Lake
Gettysburg, An American Story	2012	US	documentary	Michael Gray	Peter Graves (commentary)
The War Is Over	2010	Switzerland	feature	Mitko Panov	Enver Petrovci, Ljupcho Todorovski, Blerta Syla
Ring Of Water	2012	Italy	feature	Joel Stangle	Anwar Ong Bak, Elisa Pennisi, Enrico Toscano, Faraone Ahmed
Innocent Blood	2013	US	feature	D.J. Holloway, Sun Kim	Alexandra Bokyun Chun, C.S. Lee, Jun-Seong Kim, Justin Chon
Song Of Silence	2012	China	feature	Chen Zhuo	Wu Bingbin, Li Qiang, Ying Yaning
The Honeytrap	2002	UK	feature	Michael Gunther	Emily Lloyd, Anthony Green, Valerie Edmond, Stuart McQuarrie

== Books ==
- Thea von Harbou: The Escape of Beate Hoyermann ISBN 979-8-90757-000-9
- Anonymous: The Air Pirate and His Steerable Airship - Vol. 1: The Master of the Skies ISBN 979-8-90757-002-3
- Anonymous: The Air Pirate and His Steerable Airship - Vol. 40: Mutiny Aboard the Ether-Ship ISBN 979-8-90757-003-0
- Anonymous: The Air Pirate and His Steerable Airship - Vol. 42: In the Crater of Death of the New Planet ISBN 979-8-90757-006-1
- Anonymous: The Air Pirate and His Steerable Airship - Vol. 56: The Ether-Voyagers Upon the Giant Planet ISBN 979-8-90757-008-5
- Anonymous: The Air Pirate and His Steerable Airship - Vol. 63: The Perilous Cruise of the Ether-Ship ISBN 979-8-90757-010-8
- Anonymous: The Air Pirate and His Steerable Airship - Vol. 66: The Ether-Ship Amidst the Giant Comets ISBN 979-8-90757-012-2
