= Galveston (Quarrington novel) =

2004 novel by Paul Quarrington

- First edition
- Author: Paul Quarrington
- Language: English
- Genre: Novel
- Publisher: Random House Canada
- Publication date: 2004
- Publication place: Canada
- Media type: Print (Hardback)
- Pages: 256 pp
- Preceded by: The Spirit Cabinet
- Followed by: The Ravine

Galveston, also published as Storm Chasers in the United States, is a novel by Canadian writer Paul Quarrington, published in 2004 by Random House Canada. The novel centres on a group of storm chasers who have gathered at a seaside hotel on Dampier Cay in the Caribbean Sea to await the arrival of Hurricane Claire.

The primary characters are Caldwell and Beverly, who are each haunted by storm-related personal losses and share a historical obsession with the 1900 Galveston hurricane that destroyed Galveston, Texas, and Maywell Hope, the manager of the hotel. Caldwell was first drawn to extreme weather by a childhood memory of Hurricane Hazel, and has had storm chasing experiences that included being hit by lightning, while Beverly has been obsessed with the destructive power of cyclonic motion since her daughter was killed by being sucked into the drain of a swimming pool. Maywell, nicknamed "Bonefish", is the descendant of pirates who first populated the island, and has his own obsession with the weather as hurricanes hit on both of the only two occasions in his entire life that he has ever left the island.

Supporting characters include Jimmy Newton, who runs a storm chasing website and plans to stream live video of Hurricane Claire on the internet, Polly Greenwich, Maywell's common-law wife and the proprietor of the hotel, and Lester Vaughan, the hotel's alcoholic handyman.

The novel was a shortlisted nominee for the 2004 Giller Prize.
