= Home Game (novel) =

1983 novel by Paul Quarrington

- First edition cover design
- Author: Paul Quarrington
- Language: English
- Genre: Novel
- Publisher: Doubleday Canada
- Publication date: 1983
- Publication place: Canada
- Media type: Print (Hardback)
- Pages: 309 pp
- Preceded by: The Service
- Followed by: The Life of Hope

Home Game is a novel by Paul Quarrington, published in 1983 by Doubleday Canada.

The novel's central character is Nathaniel Isbister, a former professional baseball player turned drifter. Coming across a town dominated primarily by a religious cult called the House of Jonah, he is ultimately called upon to lead the town's only other residents, a ragtag band of circus freaks, in a high-stakes baseball game to determine which of the two groups will be forced to pack up and leave town.

The novel was a shortlisted finalist for the Stephen Leacock Award in 1984.

Following Quarrington's successes with his later novels King Leary and Whale Music, the novel was republished in paperback by Vintage Canada in 1996.
