= Civilization (novel) =

Book by Paul Quarrington

Civilization, and Its Part in My Downfall
- First edition
- Author: Paul Quarrington
- Language: English
- Genre: Novel
- Publisher: Random House Canada
- Publication date: 1994
- Publication place: Canada
- Media type: Print (Hardback)
- Pages: 309 pp
- Preceded by: Logan in Overtime
- Followed by: The Spirit Cabinet

Civilization, and Its Part in My Downfall is a novel by Canadian writer Paul Quarrington, published in 1994 by Random House Canada.

Set during the early days of the film industry in Hollywood, the novel centres on Thom Moss, a onetime silent film star who is now in prison and is writing his personal account of his rise and fall. Characters who play a role in his story include J.D.D. Jensen, a Western fiction author who first introduces him to the film industry; Caspar Willison, a D. W. Griffith-like film director who first makes Moss a star but ultimately destroys him by refusing to give him a role in the planned epic film Civilization; Jefferson Foote, Willison's one-armed screenwriter and Moss's best friend in the industry; and Thespa Doone, Moss's frequent costar and love interest.

Although favourably reviewed by critics, the novel sold poorly, which pushed Quarrington to concentrate more actively on film and television writing.
