= Frisk (film) =

- Directed by: Todd Verow
- Written by: Dennis Cooper (novel); James Derek Dwyer; George LaVoo; Todd Verow
- Produced by: Jon Gerrans; Marcus Hu
- Starring: Michael Gunther; Craig Chester; Parker Posey; Alexis Arquette; Raoul O'Connell; Jaie Laplante; James Lyons; Michael Stock
- Cinematography: Greg Watkins
- Edited by: Todd Verow
- Music by: Coil, Lee Ranaldo
- Distributed by: Strand Releasing
- Release date: 1995
- Running time: 88 minutes
- Country: United States
- Language: English

Frisk is a 1995 American drama film directed by Todd Verow, based on the 1991 novel of the same name by author Dennis Cooper. It is a first-person narrative about a serial killer. Dennis (Michael Gunther) describes a series of ritual murders in letters to his sometime lover and best friend Julian (Jaie Laplante) and Julian's younger brother Kevin (Raoul O'Connell), an object of desire to Dennis.

Verow once explained in an interview "we really need to concentrate on what makes us unique, what makes us interesting and what makes us dangerous".

It is banned in the UK due to its content. It was rejected by the BBFC in 1998, and although still banned in UK, it has been shown without a certificate at London's ICA cinema. It was the closing night attraction at the 1996 San Francisco International Lesbian and Gay Film Festival. When screened in Manhattan, several cinema viewers left during the violent scenes.

Bob Mould mooted scoring the film in 1993. Dennis Cooper's work, he said, "deals with a lot of fetishes and fantasies and free-floating imagery, which I like a lot. I've read the book. It's pretty harsh. It's pretty gay."

== Cast ==
- Michael Gunther as Dennis
- Craig Chester as Henry
- Michael Stock as Uhrs
- Raoul O'Connell as Kevin
- Jaie Laplante as Julian
- Parker Posey as Ferguson
- James Lyons as Gypsy Pete
- Alexis Arquette as Punk (victim #3)
- Michael Waite as Gary
- Alyssa Wendt as Susan
- Mark Ewert as Young Dennis / Jan (victim #1) / Young Boy in park (victim #4)
- Dustin Schell as Snuff Photographer
- Michael Wilson as Party Goer
- Paul B. Riley as Party Goer
- Donald Mosner as Party Goer

== Reviews ==
In 1996, Stephen Holden of the New York Times called the film "harshly repellent" and "realistic but messy style that might be called cold porn for its utter lack of erotic warmth". It is "meandering and narratively diffuse, but it is also disturbingly well acted".
