= Logan in Overtime =

1990 novel by Paul Quarrington

- First edition
- Author: Paul Quarrington
- Language: English
- Published: Doubleday Canada, 1990
- Publication place: Canada
- Preceded by: Whale Music
- Followed by: Civilization

Logan in Overtime is a novel by Paul Quarrington, published in 1990 by Doubleday Canada. The novel was actually written much earlier in Quarrington's career, even preceding his 1987 novel King Leary. It was slated for publication by Avon Books in 1986, but was delayed after that company discontinued its Canadian fiction line.

The novel's core theme explores the ways in which modern life needlessly complicates and ruins the simple pleasures in life. Its central character, Mars Logan, is a washed-up ice hockey player who was forced to retire from the National Hockey League due to his bad knees and is now consigned to playing for the Falconbridge Falcons, an oldtimers league team in Falconbridge, Ontario. He also has a personal passion for astronomy, due to a persistent belief that his professional hockey career ended because aliens from Sirius intentionally wrecked his knees, although he is so dissatisfied with his life that he spends most of his free time too drunk to clearly see the sky or identify the constellations.

The plot is set in motion when a game against the Hope Blazers goes into overtime. With both teams persistently unable to score the winning goal, a national media frenzy — even attracting the anchors of Hockey Night in Canada to town — is ignited as the game approaches a new record for the longest overtime game in the entire history of the sport. Ultimately, as the game enters its fifth day, the two teams decide to settle the game with a simple round of shinny on a nearby pond, setting the stage for the game's resolution and for Logan's own victory over his personal demons.

The novel forms an unofficial trilogy with Quarrington's other novels The Life of Hope and King Leary; The Life of Hope, although not about hockey, is set in the same town of Hope whose Blazers who are the opposing team in Logan, and the protagonist in King Leary lives in South Grouse, the same town where Logan was born and raised.
