= Home Game =

Home Game may refer to:

- Home game, a contest played in a sports team's home
- Home Game (TV series), American documentary series on Netflix
- Home Game (novel), a 1983 novel by Paul Quarrington
- The Home Game, 2023 sports documentary
