= Todd Klinck =

Todd Klinck is a Canadian writer, nightclub owner and pornography producer.

== Early life and education ==
Klinck moved to Toronto at age 18 to study theatre at York University, but dropped out to focus on his career. In 1996, his novel Tacones (High Heels) was the winner of the Three-Day Novel Contest, and was published by Anvil Press to strong reviews in the Toronto Star and Quill and Quire. Klinck also collaborated with John Palmer and Jaie Laplante on the screenplay for the 2004 film Sugar, which garnered a nomination for Best Adapted Screenplay at the 25th Genie Awards, and was a columnist for fab until 2005. He wrote an online only column for Xtra! called "Sex Play" in 2009, and a column called "Porndoggy" in the same publication for most of 2010. His writing has been published in the National Post, Saturday Night and Bil Bo K (Belgium).

== Career ==
Klinck and his business partner Mandy Goodhandy have launched several sex businesses in the Toronto area, including a transgender strip club, "The Lounge", an adult DVD production company, "Mayhem North", and a porn site, "Amateur Canadian Guys". In 2006 they opened a pansexual nightclub, "Goodhandy's", located in downtown Toronto. Klinck has also worked as a professional BDSM dominant, and has appeared on the television series KinK.

With Goodhandy, Klinck was chosen to be the Grand Marshal of the Pride Toronto 2010 parade.
