= Maury Chaykin =

American and Canadian actor (1949–2010)

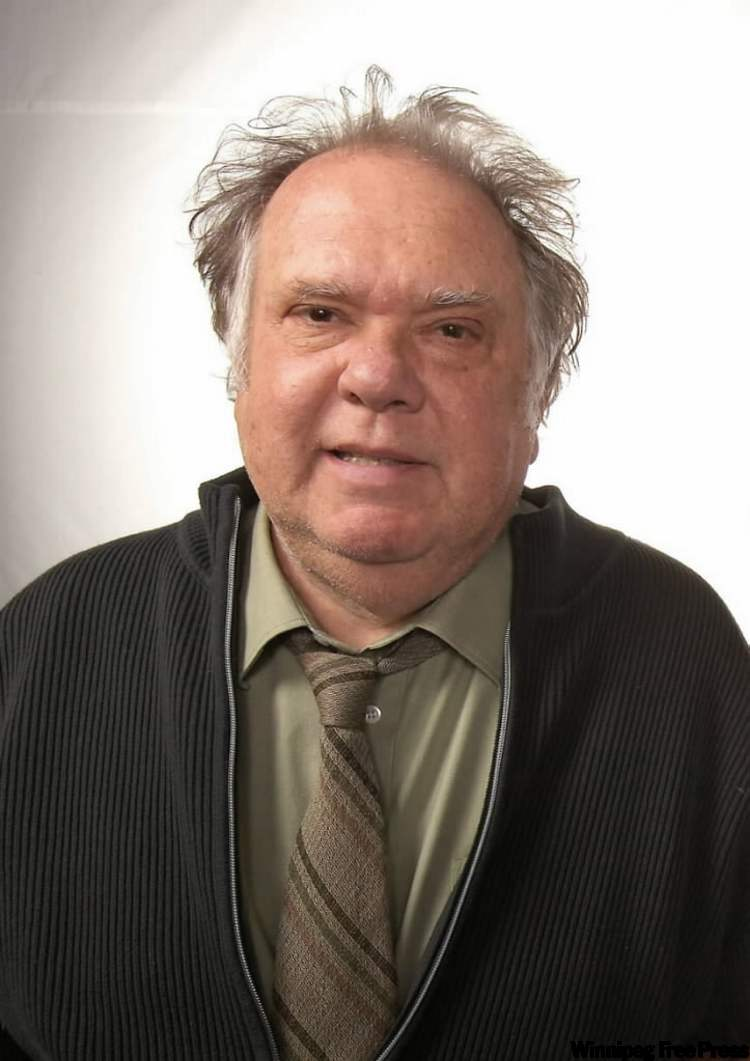
- Chaykin in 2010
- Born: Maury Alan Chaykin; July 27, 1949; New York City, U.S.
- Died: July 27, 2010 (aged 61); Toronto, Ontario, Canada
- Citizenship: United States; Canada
- Education: University at Buffalo (BA)
- Occupation: Actor
- Years active: 1968–2010
- Spouses: Ilana Frank (divorced); Susannah Hoffmann
- Children: 1
- Awards: See below

Maury Alan Chaykin (July 27, 1949 – July 27, 2010) was an American and Canadian actor. Described as "one of the most recognizable faces in Canadian cinema," he was best known for his portrayal of Rex Stout's detective Nero Wolfe on the television series A Nero Wolfe Mystery (2001–2002), as well as for his work as a character actor in many films and television programs.

His notable film appearances include WarGames (1983), Twins (1988), Dances With Wolves (1990), My Cousin Vinny (1992), Money for Nothing (1993), Devil in a Blue Dress (1995), Cutthroat Island (also 1995), The Sweet Hereafter (1997), Mouse Hunt (also 1997), The Mask of Zorro (1998), Entrapment (1999) and Mystery, Alaska (also 1999), Being Julia (2004), Blindness (2008), and Barney's Version (2010). During the 1990s, he was a frequent collaborator of Toronto New Wave director Atom Egoyan. On television, he starred as Sam Blecher on the first two seasons of the Canadian dramedy Less Than Kind (2008–2010).

Chaykin was a three-time Genie Award nominee, winning Best Actor in a Leading Role for Whale Music (1994), and a two-time Gemini Award winner. He won two Canadian Comedy Awards and an ACTRA Award for his work on Less Than Kind.

== Early life ==
Chaykin was born to parents of Russian Jewish descent in Brooklyn, New York. His American father, Irving J. Chaykin, was born in Brooklyn, and was a professor of accountancy at City College of New York. His Canadian mother, Clarice Chaykin (née Bloomfield), was born in Winnipeg, Manitoba, but raised in Montreal, Quebec, since the age of three. She graduated from Beth Israel Hospital nursing school in Newark, New Jersey. Chaykin's Montreal-born maternal uncle, George Bloomfield (1930–2011), was a veteran Canadian director, producer, writer and actor who directed Chaykin in a number of projects for film and television.

Raised in New York City, Chaykin studied drama at the University at Buffalo, The State University of New York, where he co-founded an avant-garde troupe called the Swamp Fox Theater Group. After performing uninvited at an underground theatre festival in Toronto, Ontario, he was encouraged by artistic director Ken Gass to relocate there. He subsequently moved to Toronto in 1974, where he resided until his death.

== Career ==
Chaykin was known for portrayals of blustery supporting characters. One of his rare leading roles was Nero Wolfe. Chaykin first played the legendary detective in The Golden Spiders: A Nero Wolfe Mystery (2000), an A&E telefilm adaptation of the 1953 novel by Rex Stout. Timothy Hutton costarred in the production as Archie Goodwin. The New York Times reported Chaykin's "undisguised delight" at starring in the promotion for The Golden Spiders: "There's an extraordinary billboard up on Sunset Boulevard right now, with a humongous photograph of my face. ... I drive by it constantly, back and forth, back and forth." The original movie's success led to the weekly series, A Nero Wolfe Mystery, which played for two seasons on A&E and aired internationally. Chaykin and Hutton had worked together previously, albeit briefly, in the 1985 film Turk 182; and they worked together subsequently, in the 2006 film Heavens Fall.

Two of Chaykin's early motion picture roles brought him public recognition: computer programmer Jim Sting in WarGames and prosecution witness Sam Tipton in My Cousin Vinny. In 1990, he had a small but pivotal role in the film Dances with Wolves, portraying Major Fambrough, an Army fort commander who kills himself as a result of becoming insane.

Chaykin had his first starring role in Whale Music, a 1994 film in which he played a burned-out rock star, a character based largely on Brian Wilson. Chaykin was named Best Actor at the 15th Genie Awards for his portrayal.

Chaykin also had roles on the television series Seeing Things and Emily of New Moon as well as a recurring role as the intergalactic gourmand Nerus (a nod to Nero Wolfe) in Stargate SG-1.

Chaykin portrayed the colorful bookie Frank Perlin opposite Philip Seymour Hoffman's compulsive gambler Dan Mahowny in Owning Mahowny, a film that critic Roger Ebert named as one of the ten best of 2003. In 2006, Chaykin appeared in an episode of the Ken Finkleman miniseries At the Hotel and received a Gemini Award for best performance by an actor in a guest role. He had a semi-recurring role in the HBO series Entourage, as volatile movie producer Harvey Weingard, an imitation of the soon-to-be disgraced producer Harvey Weinstein. He also appeared as Stan Deane, father of Kevin Zegers' character Woody Deane, in the 2006 romantic comedy It's a Boy Girl Thing.

Chaykin starred as Sam Blecher, the owner of a family-run driving school in Winnipeg, in the first two seasons (2008–2010) of the Canadian comedy-drama television series Less Than Kind. The series received the 2010 Gemini Award for Best Comedy Program or Series.

"Sam is an out-of-control, good-hearted, big-hearted person who just can't quite get it right with his family," Chaykin told Q radio interviewer Jian Ghomeshi in April 2010. "He's full of love but he can't express it. But what he does express is anxiety, desperation, and the need to dominate, which is kind of pathetic." Asked whether he liked the character, Chaykin replied, "I love him. I do, I really do, and it's the same kind of love that a person has for family — where you see their foibles but at the same time you embrace them because they are a part of you. And Sam certainly is a part of me."

In 2011, Chaykin posthumously received the ACTRA Toronto Award for Outstanding Performance — Male for his performance as Sam Blecher in Less Than Kind. He had been nominated for the award in 2003, for his portrayal of Nero Wolfe.

== Personal life ==
Chaykin's first marriage, to Canadian producer Ilana Frank, ended in divorce. He was subsequently married to Canadian actress Susannah Hoffmann, with whom he had one daughter, Rose. Best known for having played Jen Pringle in the Anne of Avonlea series, Hoffmann had a supporting role in a 2002 episode of the television series A Nero Wolfe Mystery, in which Chaykin starred.

Chaykin was a dual citizen of the United States and Canada.

== Critical appraisal ==
Writing for the Toronto International Film Festival, Brian D. Johnson summarized Chaykin's screen persona as "[bringing] an unnerving edge to whatever character he plays, a disturbing sense of dissociation. But while all his roles are weird, each is weird in its own way. Modifying his signature from one role to the next, Chaykin gives the impression of creating the character as the camera rolls."

Bruce Weber of The New York Times posthumously described Chaykin as "a ubiquitous character actor who specialized in comic roles with disturbing undertones and disturbing roles with comic undertones."

== Death ==
Maury Chaykin died in Toronto on July 27, 2010, his 61st birthday, from complications of a heart valve infection.

== Filmography ==
=== Film ===
Year	Title	Role	Director	Notes	Ref.
1975	Me	Oliver Jordan	John Palmer		
1980	Nothing Personal	Kanook	George Bloomfield		
1980	Double Negative	Rollins	George Bloomfield		
1980	The Kidnapping of the President	Harvey Cannon	George Mendeluk		
1981	Death Hunt	Clarence	Peter R. Hunt		
1982	Soup for One	Dr. Wexler	Jonathan Kaufer		
1982	Highpoint	Falco	Peter Carter		
1983	Curtains	Monty	Richard Ciupka; Peter Simpson		
1983	WarGames	Jim Sting	John Badham	Maury’s scene directed by Martin Brest	
1983	Of Unknown Origin	Dan Errol	George P. Cosmatos		
1984	Harry & Son	Lawrence	Paul Newman		
1984	Mrs. Soffel	Guard Charlie Reynolds	Gillian Armstrong		
1985	Turk 182	Man In Wheelchair	Bob Clark		
1985	Def-Con 4	Vinny	Paul Donovan		
1986	The Vindicator	Burt Arthurs	Jean-Claude Lord		
1986	Meatballs III: Summer Job	Huey	George Mendeluk		
1987	The Bedroom Window	Pool Player	Curtis Hanson		
1987	Wild Thing	Jonathan Trask	Max Reid		
1987	Future Block	Voice	Kevin McCracken		
1987	Nowhere to Hide	Marchais	Mario Philip Azzopardi		
1987	Hearts of Fire	Charlie Kelso	Richard Marquand		
1987	Caribe	Captain Burdoch	Michael Kennedy		
1988	Higher Education	Guido	John Sheppard	Uncredited	
1988	Stars and Bars	Freeborn Gage	Pat O'Connor		
1988	Iron Eagle II	Sgt. Neville Downs	Sidney J. Furie		
1988	Twins	Burt Klane	Ivan Reitman		
1989	Millennium	Roger Keane	Michael Anderson		
1989	Cold Comfort	Floyd Lucas	Vic Sarin		
1989	George's Island	Mr. Droonfield	Paul Donovan		
1989	Breaking In	Vincent Tucci	Bill Forsyth		
1990	Where the Heart Is	Harry	John Boorman		
1990	Mr. Destiny	Guzelman	James Orr		
1990	Dances With Wolves	Maj. Fambrough	Kevin Costner		
1991	The Adjuster	Bubba	Atom Egoyan		
1991	The Pianist	Cody	Claude Gagnon		
1991	Montréal vu par...	Jurgen Van Doom	Atom Egoyan	Segment: "En passant"	
1992	My Cousin Vinny	Sam Tipton	Jonathan Lynn		
1992	Leaving Normal	Leon "Crazy-As" Pendleton	Edward Zwick		
1992	Buried on Sunday	Dexter Lexcannon	Paul Donovan		
1992	Hero	Winston	Stephen Frears		
1993	Sommersby	Dawson	Jon Amiel		
1993	Money for Nothing	Vincente Goldoni	Ramón Menéndez		
1993	Josh and S.A.M.	Pizza Man	Billy Weber		
1993	Beethoven's 2nd	Cliff Klamath	Rod Daniel		
1994	Exotica	Exotica Club Client	Atom Egoyan	Uncredited	
1994	Whale Music	Desmond Howl	Richard J. Lewis		
1994	Camilla	Harold Cara	Deepa Mehta		
1994	Transplant		Bradley Walsh	Short film	
1995	Unstrung Heroes	Arthur Lidz	Diane Keaton		
1995	Devil in a Blue Dress	Matthew Terell	Carl Franklin		
1995	Cutthroat Island	John Reed	Renny Harlin		
1996	Harriet the Spy	Holiday Pageant Director	Bronwen Hughes	Uncredited	
1997	Love and Death on Long Island	Irving Buckmuller	Richard Kwietniowski		
1997	The Sweet Hereafter	Wendell Walker	Atom Egoyan		
1997	Gone Fishin'	Kirk	Christopher Cain	Uncredited	
1997	Strip Search	Tomas	Rod Hewitt		
1997	Pale Saints	The Pirate	J. H. Wyman		
1997	A Life Less Ordinary	Tod Johnson	Danny Boyle		
1997	Mouse Hunt	Alexander Falko	Gore Verbinski		
1998	Jerry and Tom	Billy	Saul Rubinek		
1998	The Mask of Zorro	Prison Warden	Martin Campbell		
1999	Let the Devil Wear Black	Bruce	Stacy Title		
1999	Entrapment	Conrad Greene	Jon Amiel		
1999	Touched	Bert	Mort Ransen		
1999	Jacob Two Two Meets the Hooded Fang	Mr. Cooper / Louie Loser	George Bloomfield		
1999	Mystery, Alaska	Bailey Pruitt	Jay Roach		
2000	What's Cooking?	Herb Seeling	Gurinder Chadha		
2000	The Art of War	FBI Agent Frank Capella	Christian Duguay		
2001	Bartleby	Ernest	Jonathan Parker		
2001	Plan B	Donald Rossi	Greg Yaitanes		
2001	On Their Knees	Norman	Anais Granofsky		
2002	Past Perfect	Chuck	Daniel MacIvor		
2002	The Wet Season	Uncle Rick	Martha Ferguson	Short	
2002	Hostage	The Kidnapper	John Woo	Segment for the BMW short film series The Hire	
2003	Owning Mahowny	Frank Perlin	Richard Kwietniowski		
2004	Sugar	Stanley	John Palmer		
2004	Being Julia	Walter Gibbs	István Szabó		
2004	Intern Academy	Dr. Roger "Tony" Toussant	Dave Thomas		
2004	Wilby Wonderful	Mayor Brent Fisher	Daniel MacIvor		
2005	Where the Truth Lies	Sally Sanmarco	Atom Egoyan		
2006	Heavens Fall	Lyle Harris	Terry Green		
2006	It's a Boy Girl Thing	Stan Deane	Nick Hurran		
2008	Production Office	Shelly	Deborah Marks; Steve Solomos		
2008	The Grift	Rusty	Ralph E. Portillo		
2008	Blindness	The Accountant	Fernando Meirelles		
2008	Adoration	Passenger & Professor On-Line	Atom Egoyan		
2008	Bull	Roland Gow	Kent Tessman		
2008	Hooked on Speedman	Dietrich Baum	Michelle Ouellet		
2009	Cooking with Stella	H.E. Mr. Durand	Dilip Mehta		
2010	Barney's Version	John Emory	Richard J. Lewis		
2010	Casino Jack	Anthony "Big Tony" Moscatiello	George Hickenlooper		
2011	Conduct Unbecoming	Colonel Fox	Sidney J. Furie	Posthumous release	

=== Television ===
Year	Title	Role	Notes	Ref.
1978	King of Kensington	Unknown	Episode: "Polyfur"	
1980	Jimmy B. and André	Bruno	TV movie	
1981	Just Jessie	Joey Harper	TV movie	
1981	The July Group	Harvey	TV movie	
1982–1986	Seeing Things	Randall Jackson	4 episodes	
1983	ABC Weekend Special	"Mousey"	Episode: "Horatio Alger Updated: Frank and Fearless"	
1983	American Playhouse	Gondol	Episodes: "Overdrawn at the Memory Bank"	
1984	The Guardian	Rudy Simbro	TV movie	
1984	Hockey Night	"Bum" Johnston	TV movie	
1985	In Like Flynn	Williams	TV movie	
1985	Canada's Sweetheart: The Saga of Hal C. Banks	Harold Chamberlain Banks	TV movie	
1985	The Suicide Murders	Sid	TV movie	
1986	Act of Vengeance	Claude Vealey	TV movie	
1986	Philip Marlowe, Private Eye	Lieutenant Copernik	Episode: "Red Wind"	
1986	Adderly	Russian Agent	Episode: "Requiem"	
1986	Night Heat	Mallory / Merle Marlowe	2 episodes	
1986	Crime Story	Steven Kordo	Episode: "Crime Pays"	
1986	Sharon, Lois & Bram's Elephant Show	Fire Captain	Episode: "There's an Elephant Stuck Up That Tree"	
1987	Diamonds	Murray Wolf	Episode: "Here Comes the Bride"	
1987	Race for the Bomb	General Leslie Groves	2 episodes	
1988	Hot Paint	Wilensky	TV movie	
1989	The Twilight Zone	James L. "Fats" Brown	Episode: "A Game of Pool"	
1990	Street Legal	Ben Tochet	2 episodes	
1990	Labour of Love	Unknown	TV movie	
1991	Conspiracy of Silence	Lawyer D'Arcy Bancroft	Episode: "Episode #1.1"	
1992	Split Images	Walter Kouza	TV movie	
1993	Matrix	Lionel Meeks / Charles Meeks	2 episodes	
1995	Sugartime	Tony Accardo	TV movie	
1996	If Looks Could Kill	Dr. Richard Boggs	TV movie	
1997	Keeping the Promise	Ben Loomis	TV movie	
1997	La Femme Nikita	Rudy	Episode: "Innocent"	
1997	Northern Lights	Ben Rubadue	TV movie	
1997–1998	Due South	Pike / Jasper Gutman	2 episodes	
1998	Tracey Takes On...	Kurt Rasmussen	Episode: "Marriage"	
1998	Emily of New Moon	Lofty John	Episode: "Paradise Lost"	
1998	Psi Factor: Chronicles of the Paranormal	Dr. Bob Dalhousie	Episode: "Harlequin"	
1999	Lexx	Pa Gollean	2 episodes	
1999	Made in Canada	Captain McGee	Episode: "For the Children"	
1999	Joan of Arc	Robert de Baudricourt	3 episodes	
2000	The Golden Spiders: A Nero Wolfe Mystery	Nero Wolfe	TV movie	
2001	Varian's War	Marcello	TV movie	
2001–2002	A Nero Wolfe Mystery	Nero Wolfe	20 episodes	
2001	Bleacher Bums	Billy, The Scorekeeper	TV movie	
2002	Crossed Over	Ethan Lowry	TV movie	
2003	Tracey Ullman in the Trailer Tales	Dan Weisman	TV movie	
2003	Andromeda	Citizen Eight	Episode: "Pieces of Eight"	
2004	CSI: Crime Scene Investigation	Joseph Greene / Joe Landers	Episode: "No More Bets"	
2004	The Eleventh Hour	Dr. Jackson	Episode: "The Revenge Specialist"	
2004	Sex Traffic	Ernie Dwight	2 episodes	
2005	The Hunt for the BTK Killer	Robert Beattie	TV movie	
2005–2006	Stargate SG-1	Nerus	2 episodes	
2005–2007	Entourage	Harvey Weingard	4 episodes	
2006	Boston Legal	Ryan Myerson	Episode: "Live Big"	
2006	At the Hotel'	Jerry Mitchell	Episode: "The Perfect Couple"	
2006	Trailer Park Boys	Chief of Police	Episode: "Gimme My Fuckin Money or Randy's Dead"	
2006	Eureka	Sheriff William Cobb	Episode: "Pilot"	
2007	Superstorm	Senator Wallace	3 episodes	
2007	Elijah	Premier Howard Pawley	TV movie	
2008	Glitch	Mr. Linkletter	TV movie	
2008	Murder on Her Mind	John Emory	TV movie	
2008–2010	Less Than Kind	Sam Blecher	26 episodes	
2009	Abroad	Lord Oldenberg	TV movie	
2011	The Drunk and On Drugs Happy Funtime Hour	Doctor Funtime	Episode: "Maury Chaykin Fucked Us"	

== Partial theatre credits ==
Select theatre credits for Maury Chaykin were part of his resumé at Edna Talent Management, Ltd.

Year	Title	Role	Director	Company	Ref.
1968	Oh! What A Lovely War	Ambassador	Tom Moore	University at Buffalo Theatre	
1973	Fat Fell Down	Spike		Theater for the New City	
1974	Me?	Oliver Jordan	John Palmer	Toronto Free Theatre	
1974	Tony's Woman	Alexq	Hrant Alianak	Theatre Passe Muraille	
1977	Gossip	Sam Lewis	John Palmer	Toronto Free Theatre	
1977	The Boy Bishop	De Bois	Ken Gass	Factory Theatre Lab	
1977	Romulus the Great	Zeno	Marion André	Theatre Plus	
1978	Gimme Shelter	Ton	Des McAnuff	Brooklyn Academy of Music Dodger Theatre	
1979	Leave It to Beaver Is Dead	Thompson	Des McAnuff	The Public Theater	
1985	A Man's a Man	Jip	Robert Woodruff	La Jolla Playhouse	

== Awards and honours ==
Year	Award	Category	Work	Result	Ref.
1986	Gemini Awards	Best Performance by a Lead Actor in a Single Dramatic Program	Canada's Sweetheart: The Saga of Hal C. Banks	Nominated	
1989	Genie Awards	Best Performance by an Actor in a Supporting Role	Iron Eagle II	Nominated	
1990	Genie Awards	Best Performance by an Actor in a Leading Role	Cold Comfort	Nominated	
1994	Genie Awards	Best Performance by an Actor in a Leading Role	Whale Music	Won	
1997	National Board of Review	Best Acting by an Ensemble	The Sweet Hereafter	Won	
1998	Gemini Awards	Best Performance by an Actor in a Guest Role in a Dramatic Series	La Femme Nikita ("Innocent")	Won	
1998	Gemini Awards	Best Performance by an Actor in a Guest Role in a Dramatic Series	Emily of New Moon ("Paradise Lost")	Nominated	
2003	ACTRA Award	Outstanding Performance – Male	A Nero Wolfe Mystery	Nominated	
2006	Gemini Awards	Best Performance by an Actor in a Guest Role in a Dramatic Series	At the Hotel ("The Perfect Couple")	Won	
2009	Canadian Comedy Awards	Best Performance by an Ensemble – Television	Less Than Kind	Won	
2010	Canadian Comedy Awards	Best Performance by an Ensemble – Television	Less Than Kind	Won	
2011	ACTRA Awards	Outstanding Performance – Male	Less Than Kind	Won	
