= Camilla (1994 film) =

1994 Canadian-British film by Deepa Mehta

- DVD cover
- Directed by: Deepa Mehta
- Written by: Ali Jenning; Paul Quarrington
- Produced by: Jonathan Barker
- Starring: Jessica Tandy; Bridget Fonda
- Cinematography: Guy Dufaux
- Edited by: Barry Farrell
- Music by: John Altman; Daniel Lanois
- Production companies: Majestic Films International; Shaftesbury Films; Telefilm Canada; Newcomm; Norstar Releasing
- Distributed by: Miramax Films; Entertainment (United Kingdom)
- Release dates: November 25, 1994 (Canada); February 17, 1995 (United Kingdom)
- Running time: 95 minutes
- Countries: Canada; United Kingdom
- Language: English
- Box office: $250,993 (US/Canada)

Camilla is a 1994 Canadian-British comedy drama film directed by Deepa Mehta. It was Jessica Tandy's penultimate film appearance and is dedicated to her memory. Tandy plays the title character, Camilla Cara, a former concert violinist. Bridget Fonda plays the role of Freda Lopez, an unfulfilled musician and composer.

== Plot ==
Freda Lopez is a singer and songwriter who desires to have a career as a performer, but lacks the courage to pursue it. Her husband Vincent Lopez insists to her that music is only a hobby for her. Freda and Vincent decide to take a vacation to Savannah, Georgia, where they meet Camilla Cara, who lives near their cottage. Freda and Camilla bond when Freda learns that Camilla was once a musician, having previously enjoyed a renowned career in her native Canada as a concert violinist. Camilla regales Freda with stories about her greatest triumph, performing the Brahms' Violin Concerto at Toronto's Winter Garden Theatre. When Camilla learns that the Brahms concerto is to be performed again at the Winter Garden, she and Freda decide they don’t want to miss it and head north to Canada together.

Left behind are Vincent and Camilla’s son Harold, a B-movie producer. When they discover the ladies have vanished, they go on a search for the women, and in the process come to realize that they must reconcile their broken relationships with the women in their lives.

== Cast ==
- Jessica Tandy as Camilla Cara
- Bridget Fonda as Freda Lopez
- Elias Koteas as Vincent Lopez
- Maury Chaykin as Harold Cara
- Graham Greene as Hunt Weller
- Hume Cronyn as Ewald

== Production ==
After the success of her film Sam & Me, which won an honorable mention for the Camera d'Or Award at the Cannes Film Festival, Deepa Mehta was offered various projects. Among them was Camilla, which Miramax Films had acquired the North American distribution rights to. "What attracted me to the story was the relationship between the two female leads. I liked that even though one was younger, adventurous, and rather fanciful (played by Bridget Fonda) and the other older, timid, and unsure (played by Jessica Tandy), what they had in common was a love of music. Camilla was a road movie with two luminous actors, and I loved every minute of the shoot," said Mehta. Filming began in June 1993.

Mehta’s cut of the film did poorly at Miramax’s first test screening, prompting studio co-head Harvey Weinstein to re-cut the film and change the score. Mehta was unhappy with the changes, saying "I did my director’s cut, walked out, and never saw the film again."

== Release ==
The film opened in limited release in Canada on 25 November 1994, followed by a gradual rollout in North America by Miramax that December. The film opened on three screens in the United Kingdom on 17 February 1995 and grossed £1,978 in its opening weekend.

== Critical reception ==
Camilla received a mixed response from critics. On review aggregator Rotten Tomatoes, the film holds a 44% rating based on 9 reviews.

Several reviewers wrote that Tandy's performance was the best aspect of the film. Janet Maslin of The New York Times described Tandy was a "graceful presence" in the film, and said that "She moves enchantingly through an otherwise treacly film that wouldn't work without her." Brendan Kelly gave a positive review in Variety, writing "Quarrington — who also wrote Whale Music – has penned a script that neatly captures the bittersweet tone of the story without slipping into syrupy sentimentality. Toronto-based helmer Deepa Mehta maintains a quick pace, alternating between comedy and pathos." Roger Ebert of the Chicago Sun-Times wrote that Tandy's final film roles "show an elderly woman of great dignity and strength, stubbornness and eventual warmth" and concluded that "What Camilla adds to the palate is humor and some naughtiness". In a review in the San Francisco Chronicle, Peter Stack wrote that Tandy was a "bright, vital presence" in the film and said that "Tandy's eyes are so full of light and impish good humor, it's no wonder she almost sweeps away Fonda", concluding that "Tandy's performance is so enchanting, you forgive a lot". Kevin Thomas of the Los Angeles Times wrote, "Structurally, Camilla is a mess, but Tandy and Fonda are wonderful together as a fast friendship between Camilla and Freda develops. The reunion between Camilla and the Niagara Falls violin maker (Cronyn) who was her true love is inevitably poignant. The chance to experience America’s greatest acting team since the Lunts for one final time, plus the appealing Fonda, does in fact tempt you to forgive Camilla its various shortcomings."
