= The Ravine (novel) =

2008 novel by Paul Quarrington

- First edition
- Author: Paul Quarrington
- Language: English
- Genre: Novel
- Publisher: Random House Canada
- Publication date: 2008
- Publication place: Canada
- Media type: Print (Hardback)
- Pages: 304 pp
- Preceded by: Galveston

The Ravine is a novel by Paul Quarrington, published in 2008 by Random House Canada. It was Quarrington's tenth novel, and the last one published during his lifetime.

Quarrington acknowledged that the novel was his most explicitly semi-autobiographical work. "It's about a writer who squanders his talents in television, drinks too much, screws around and ruins his marriage," Quarrington said. "The reason it's 'semi-autobiographical' is the guy's name is 'Phil.'" In a notable inversion, however, Quarrington was renowned primarily as a novelist and had a secondary career as a film and television screenwriter, while the novel's protagonist Phil McQuigge has worked entirely in television and is only beginning to work on his first novel. However, in some other interviews, instead of emphasizing the autobiographical aspects, Quarrington described the novel as what would have happened if he had been the author of Mystic River instead of Dennis Lehane.

In the novel, television writer Phil McQuigge is haunted by memories of a childhood incident when he, his brother and a classmate named Norman were accosted and tied up in a ravine by two violent older boys; however, he lost touch with Norman soon afterward and has never fully understood what happened. In the process of writing his novel about the incident, he resolves to track Norman down to find out once and for all.

Quarrington told The Globe and Mail that he and his brother did have a childhood incident in a ravine, although he stated that the real incident wasn't as dramatic or as enduringly haunting as the way he chose to fictionalize it for the sake of the novel.

Quarrington's 2008 short film Pavane, his first film as a director, was an adaptation of the novel. It stars Geraint Wyn Davies and Ted Dykstra as Phil McQuigge and his brother Jay.

The novel was a longlisted nominee for the 2008 Scotiabank Giller Prize.
