= Oskar Hoffmann =

Oskar Hoffmann may refer to:

- Oskar Hoffmann (painter) (1851–1912), Baltic-German painter from Estonia
- Oskar Hoffmann (author) (1866–1928), German science-fiction writer
- Oskar Hoffmann (politician) (1877–1953), German editor and politician
