= Jaie Laplante =

Canadian-American screenwriter and actor

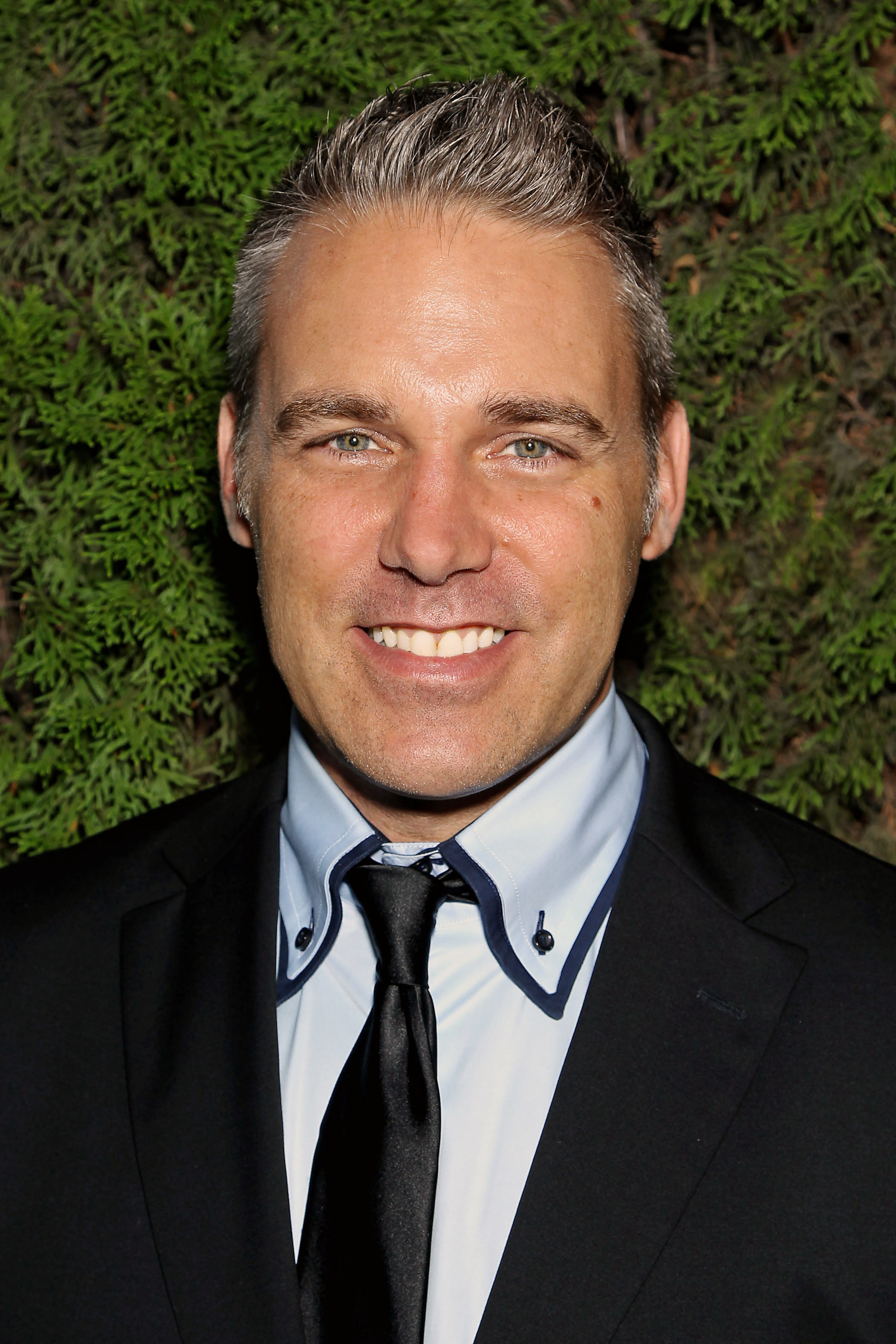
- Born: Alberta, Canada
- Occupations: Screenwriter; actor; curator

Jaie Laplante is a Canadian-American screenwriter, actor and curator.

Born in Alberta, Canada, Laplante's notable credits include co-screenwriter of Sugar, for which he received a nomination in the Best Adapted Screenplay category of the 2005 Academy of Canadian Cinema & Television's 25th Genie Awards, along with co-writers John Palmer and Todd Klinck. As an actor, he appeared in Frisk, directed by Todd Verow.

== Career ==
Laplante served as executive director and chief curator of Miami International Film Festival from 2010 to 2022.

In 2022, Laplante was named artistic director for DOC NYC.
