= King Leary =

1987 novel by Paul Quarrington

- First edition
- Author: Paul Quarrington
- Language: English
- Subject: Ice-Hockey
- Genre: Novel
- Publisher: Doubleday Canada
- Publication date: 1987
- Publication place: Canada
- Media type: Print (Hardback)
- Pages: 232 pp
- ISBN: 978-0-385-25138-9
- OCLC: 16867999
- Dewey Decimal: 813/.54 19
- LC Class: PR9199.3.Q34 K55 1987
- Preceded by: The Life of Hope
- Followed by: Whale Music

King Leary is a novel by Canadian humorist Paul Quarrington, published in 1987 by Doubleday Canada.

The novel is part of an unofficial trilogy with Quarrington's earlier The Life of Hope and his later Logan in Overtime. Although none of the novels centre on the same protagonists, they all feature some background interrelationships of character and setting.

== Plot introduction ==
The novel's protagonist is Percival "King" Leary, a legendary retired ice hockey player living in a small town nursing home in South Grouse, who is invited to Toronto by a young hotshot advertising executive to record a ginger ale commercial.

The novel tracks his experiences on the trip, as well as exploring his past career through flashbacks. Included amongst these reminiscences are his times at a juvenile reformatory as well as his years with several hockey teams.

The book's cast consists of various hockey players; an aged journalist, ‘Blue’ Hermann, who chronicled Leary’s professional life; and members of Leary’s family. In addition to chronicling his experiences on the trip, the novel explores his emotional life, as ghosts from his past come to confront him about his virtual withdrawal from any kind of life outside of the nursing home.

== Awards and nominations ==
King Leary won the Stephen Leacock Award for Humour in 1988, and was shortlisted for the Trillium Book Award. It also won the 2008 edition of CBC Radio One's Canada Reads literary competition, in which it was championed by musician and writer Dave Bidini.

The novel, which had previously been out of print for a number of years, was republished by Anchor Canada in 2007 shortly after its selection for Canada Reads was announced.
