= The Life of Hope =

1985 novel by Paul Quarrington

- First edition
- Author: Paul Quarrington
- Language: English
- Genre: Novel
- Publisher: Doubleday Canada
- Publication date: 1985
- Publication place: Canada
- Media type: Print (Hardback)
- Pages: 288 pp
- Preceded by: Home Game
- Followed by: King Leary

The Life of Hope is a novel by Paul Quarrington, published in 1985 by Doubleday Canada. It is part of an unofficial trilogy with Quarrington's later novels King Leary and Logan in Overtime; although none of the novels centre on the same protagonists, they all feature some background interrelationships of character and setting.

The novel's central character, essentially an authorial self-insertion, is a novelist named Paul who is suffering from writer's block after the publication of his baseball-themed novel Home Game. Attending a writer's retreat in the small Southern Ontario town of Hope, he learns about the town's history as a free love and nudist commune established by an expatriate American cult leader named Joseph Benton Hope, which reignites his creativity as he begins to write a fictionalized account of the town's establishment.

The novel was a shortlisted finalist for the Stephen Leacock Award in 1986.
