= Sugar (2004 film) =

2004 romantic drama film by John Palmer

- British DVD artwork
- Directed by: John Palmer
- Written by: John Palmer; Todd Klinck; Jaie Laplante
- Based on: Short stories by Bruce LaBruce
- Produced by: Damion Nurse; John Buchan
- Starring: Andre Noble; Brendan Fehr; Marnie McPhail; Sarah Polley; Maury Chaykin; Adam Chelin
- Cinematography: John Westheuser
- Music by: Ravi Persaud
- Production company: New Real Films
- Distributed by: THINKfilm
- Release date: May 22, 2004 (Inside Out Festival)
- Running time: 78 minutes
- Country: Canada
- Language: English

Sugar is a 2004 independent Canadian romantic drama film co-written and directed by John Palmer, and starring Andre Noble, Brendan Fehr, Marnie McPhail, Maury Chaykin, and Sarah Polley. Its plot follows a young gay man who falls in love with a street hustler in Toronto. It is based on short stories by Bruce LaBruce. Noble, who received strong reviews for his performance in Sugar, died just a few weeks after the film's debut.

== Plot ==
In suburban Ontario, Cliff is a young gay man who lives with his mother, Madge, an unconventional woman who owns her own chocolate delivery company, and his savvy adolescent sister, Cookie. On his 18th birthday, Cookie encourages Cliff to take a trip into Toronto, celebrate, and lose his virginity. Cookie gives him a skateboard and a joint. In the city, he encounters a gay ghetto where he meets Butch, a hustler in his 20s. Cliff is immediately infatuated with Butch and manages to strike up a conversation with him. After a while, the two begin kissing passionately in an abandoned flat, but Butch stops the encounter and leaves, declining Cliff's suggestion that they get coffee together. Cliff follows him to an alley where Butch spends his time with a group of street kids and punks. Cliff manages to ingratiate himself with the group, and spends the evening with them at Paradise, a local club. Cliff is pursued by a young pregnant woman there, but he explains to her that he is not attracted to women.

In the early morning, Cliff goes back with Butch to Butch's apartment, where they share a bed but no sex. Later, shortly after they wake up, Cliff expresses romantic interest in Butch, but Butch is evasive about becoming too invested in him. During breakfast, Butch tells Cliff he feels aroused, and the two masturbate. Butch and Cliff quickly grow close, and Cliff brings him to meet his mother and little sister. Butch and Cliff lie to Madge about the origins of their relationship, claiming to have met at Kmart, where Butch says he works as a shelf stocker. Madge takes a liking to Butch, but warns him not to hurt her son. After dinner, Cliff admits to her that Butch is in fact a hustler.

Cliff and Butch's relationship progresses, and Cliff grows more comfortable with Butch's regular clients. Among them are Stanley, a middle-aged gay man who likes to engage in non-sexual sadomasochism. One day Butch suggests Cliff participate in a sexual transaction involving one of his clients. In order to muster courage, Cliff gets "fucking high" on speed, and he and Butch arrive at the apartment of the man, who says he only wants to vicariously observe the two men have sex. Butch has anal sex with Cliff for the first time in front of the man. The encounter leaves Cliff humiliated, and he shoves Butch to the ground as the two leave, telling him he never wants to see him again. Cliff becomes profoundly depressed.

Some time later, they meet to talk, and Cliff finds that Butch has been abusing prescription medication and other drugs. Later, while alone, Butch goes to meet Cookie, who is eager to see him, outside her school. Shortly into the conversation, Butch asks her if he could buy the Ritalin she is prescribed for her attention deficit hyperactivity disorder, but she tells him she does not have access to it, and that it is dispensed by the school nurse. Butch leaves, dejected. Later, Butch calls Cliff and asks him to meet him at Paradise. Cliff reluctantly agrees, and arrives to find Butch kissing an older man, Greg, whom he says he now lives with. Butch's behavior is erratic, and he appears to be experiencing an extremely traumatic drug high. The two go to Greg's apartment alone, where Butch suggests they flee with Cookie to Hawaii. Cliff leaves, unable to communicate with Butch in his drug-induced psychotic state. Butch then accidentally severs veins in his arm and dies.

Cliff, Madge, and Cookie attend Butch's funeral. During the wake, Cliff hallucinates Butch sitting up in his casket, and reminiscing about how much fun the two had together. Later, Cliff and Cookie go to a diner, where Cliff catches the attention of a young man. Adopting a newfound confidence, Cliff proceeds to cruise him in the bathroom. Following the encounter, Cliff gives Cookie a hug before the two part ways. Cookie watches as Cliff throws his skateboard into the street-side garbage and walks away.

== Cast ==
- Andre Noble as Cliff
- Brendan Fehr as Butch
- Marnie McPhail as Madge
- Haylee Wanstall as Cookie
- Jeffrey Parazzo as Flex
- Michael Barry as Shayne
- Sarah Polley as Pregnant girl
- Maury Chaykin as Stanley
- Michael Riley as The Man
- Dorothy Gordon as Ancient Waitress

== Production ==
Filming took place in Toronto. The film was shot on video, and subsequently transferred to 35mm film for theatrical release.

== Release ==
Sugar premiered at the Inside Out Film and Video Festival in Toronto on May 22, 2004 and won the award for Best Canadian Film. It subsequently screened in San Francisco, California on June 24, 2004, before opening commercially in Canada on June 25. Approximately a month following the film's commercial release, star Andre Noble died of accidental poisoning after ingesting aconitum during a camping trip.

== Reception ==
=== Critical response ===
Dennis Harvey of Variety praised the lead performances of Noble and Fehr, adding: "Sugar sports the expected outre elements — sex, drugs, reckless self-destruction — but also has streaks of tenderness, pathos, and directorial skill... Despite [the] tale’s harsh aspects and eventual tragic turn, Sugar maintains an almost whimsical tenor that reflects Cliff’s innocently accepting walk-on-the-wide-side perspective." Michael Wilde, writing for The Advocate, praised the film's performances, writing: "Both Fehr and Noble do excellent work [and] the supporting cast, including indie darling Sarah Polley, provides plenty of humor with their eccentric performances. As tasty as Sugar is, it tortures us exquisitely with the pains of first love and of losing someone to addiction."

Peter Knegt of Exclaim! wrote: "Cliff is obviously headed for trouble, but the film works hard to avoid becoming a cautionary tale. Sugar plays down the melodrama, in that AIDS is barely mentioned, the acceptance from Cliff's family is almost assumed and the excessive drug use is hardly condemned (though it's not glamorised either). And while at times it becomes unclear whether certain events are displayed merely for shock value (some scenes border on soft-core pornography), it is clear that Sugar does an exceptional job at humanising characters that rarely receive this treatment."

=== Accolades ===
The film received two nominations at the 25th Genie Awards in 2005: Klinck, Laplante and Palmer were nominated in the Best Adapted Screenplay category, while Fehr was nominated for Best Supporting Actor.

== Home media ==
Sugar is available on DVD in the United States through TLA Video.
