= Miami Film Festival =

Annual film festival in Miami, Florida

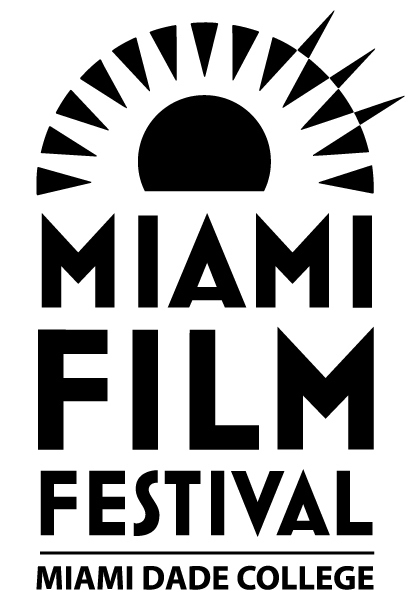
- Location: Miami, Florida, United States
- Founded: 1983; 43 years ago
- Website: www.miamifilmfestival.com

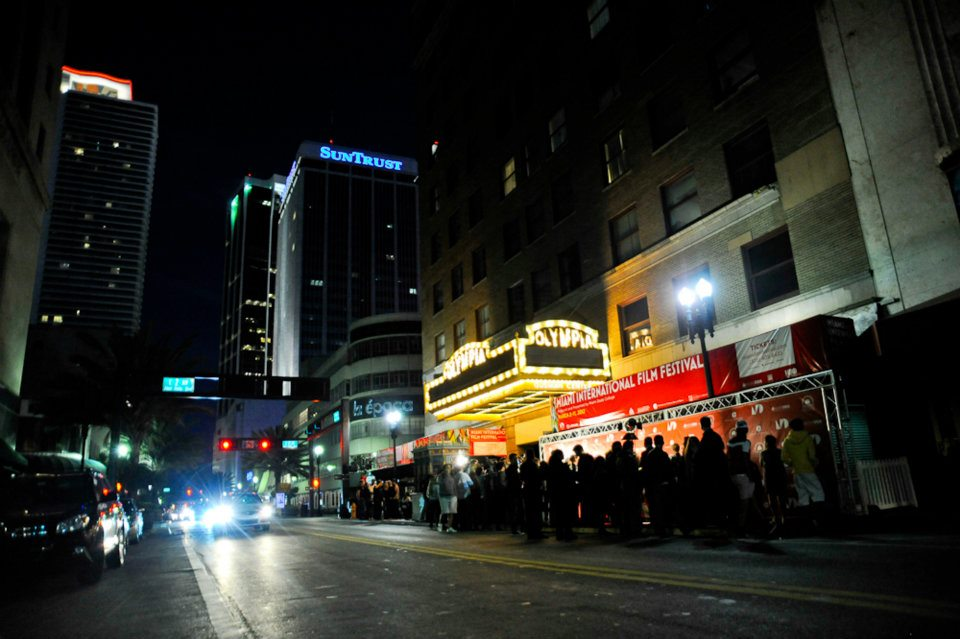
Opening

The Miami Film Festival, formerly Miami International Film Festival, is an annual film festival held in Miami, Florida, each March. Since 2015 the festival also runs a smaller Fall Festival, known as the Miami Film Festival GEMS, which presents films thought to be the GEMS of the award season.

== History ==
The Miami Film Festival debuted in February 1984, under the auspices of the Film Society of Miami. It was founded by Nat Chediak and Steven Bowles and directed by Mr. Chediak for its first eighteen years, becoming the City's premier international cultural event. When the City of Miami went bankrupt, control of the festival was assumed by Florida International University in 1999. Dismayed by FIU's stewardship following the event's loss of independence, Chediak left the festival in 2001. Miami-Dade College took over in late 2003 after Florida International University lost $20 million in state funding and incurred an $800,000 deficit.

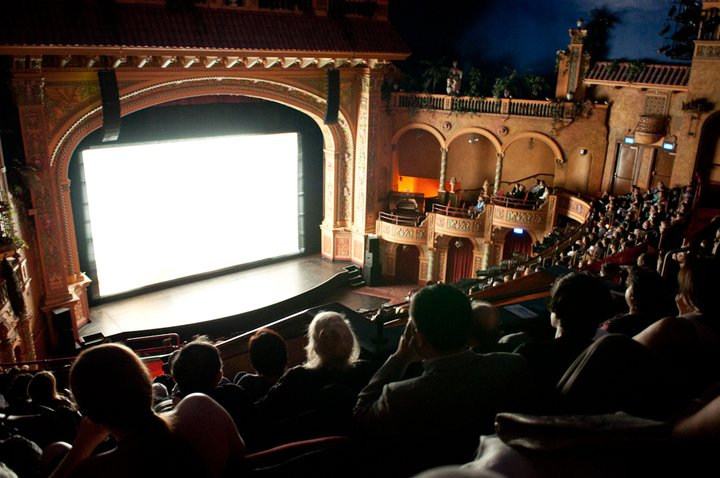
Screening

In 2006, the beginning of the ten-day festival shifted to early March. By 2012, the festival had grown to become a comprehensive global festival with an annual attendance of over 70,000.

In 2014, the festival introduced MIFFecito, a fall presentation.

In 2015, the festival launched the Gems Film Festival, a second permanent festival in addition to its annual main event held in March. GEMS is "a four-day event to present the 'jewels' of the fall season", held annually in October at Tower Theater Miami.

Jaie Laplante became director of programming in 2011.

== Description ==
The Miami Film Festival is held for 10 consecutive days, opening annually on the first Friday of April, formerly the first Friday of March. It showcases independent American and international films, with a special focus on Ibero-American films. The competitive film festival showcases films in several venues across the city center and includes features, documentaries, short films, and retrospectives. The programming is selected so as to include premieres for both established film-makers as well as up-and-comers, socially relevant films, multidisciplinary and experimental films, and films showcasing international musicians.

The stated mission of the Miami Film Festival is to bridge cultural understanding and encourage artistic development.

== See also ==
- List of Film Festivals
- List of Film Awards
- List of Film Festivals in the United States
- Miami Jewish Film Festival
