= Acqua Fuori Dal Ring =

2012 film by Joel Stangle

- Directed by: Joel Stangle
- Written by: Joel Stangle; Esther Stangle
- Produced by: Angelo di Guardia; Sami Ibrahim; Neena Litton; Joel Stangle
- Starring: Enrico Toscano; Maria Benkhalouk; Faraone Ahmed; Elisa Pennisi
- Cinematography: Clint Litton
- Edited by: Joel Stangle
- Music by: Simona di Gregorio
- Distributed by: Striped Entertainment
- Release date: November 14, 2012 (Rome)
- Running time: 113 minutes
- Country: Italy
- Languages: Sicilian, Tunisian Arabic

Acqua Fuori Dal Ring (English: Ring of Water) is 2012 Italian film written and directed by Joel Stangle, and co-written by Esther Stangle in Arabic and Italian. The film uses a largely Cinéma vérité style, and the director employed non-professional actors and an improvised script, shooting in Catania, Sicily. The film parallels the lives of two boxers living in Catania, one a Sicilian native, and the other a Tunisian migrant worker.

== Development ==
Stangle developed the concept in wanting to tell a story of migration in Italy and had an attraction to characters who were boxers, finding further inspiration in researching the Roman historian, Polybius. In a 2013 interview, Stangle said:

"I was thinking about the migration situation and the cultures of the Mediterranean and for an unexplainable reason I felt boxing had something to do with it. Later in researching I was reading a two thousand year old text from a roman historian, Polybius, and he said to understand the conflict between two cultures you need to think of it as two boxers fighting in a ring. For me history is repeating, and today's issues are similar to those of the past. If two thousand years ago they used the analogy of boxing, I think it applies today as well. But, it goes back to letting the story find its way. Boxing was part of the neighborhood I was filming in, and I had an intuitive feeling it was right."

== Production ==
The film was primarily shot in the Librino neighborhood of Catania in the public housing projects, with additional scenes filmed on the Black Lava Fields of Mount Etna.

== Release ==
The film premiered at the Rome Film Festival in November 2012, screened at the Taormina Film Fest in June 2013 and at the Denver Film Festival in November 2013. It was nominated for the Prospettive Award at the Rome Film Festival.

== Reception ==
Covering the film's screening at Taormina Film Fest in June 2013 for Film International, Oliver C. Speck described it as one of the best films of the festival, with skillful cinematography and nuanced directing. Speck noted the film's striking visuals add to its haunting beauty, "reminiscent of the heyday of Italian neorealism." Reviewing during the Rome Film Festival, Giorgio Sgarbi wrote: "the cinematography is raw and poignant... a beautiful and engaging soundtrack, with the merit of bringing the public closer to the traditional music of Sicily, which includes all the various sounds of peoples and cultures that have set foot on the island."

On Yahoo! Cinema Italia published: "Acqua fuori dal Ring confirms boxing as the most cinematographic sport there is, as well as the talent of this young American-born director."
