= Joe Hall (musician) =

German-Canadian musical artist (1947–2019)

- Born: Hans Joachim Boenke; May 15, 1947; Wuppertal, Germany
- Died: March 22, 2019 (aged 71) Peterborough, Ontario
- Genre: Folk rock
- Instrument: Vocals
- Years active: 1960s onward

Joe Hall (born Hans Joachim Boenke; May 15, 1947 – March 22, 2019), was a German-Canadian folk rock singer-songwriter.

== Biography ==
Hall was born in Wuppertal, Germany, the son of Johann Boenke and Johanna Maria Zeirmann. He grew up in London, Ontario, Canada, and by the 1960s had begun performing in a trio, Drummond-McCaul, with pianist, Daryl LeBerg and guitar player, Bill Williams, and by the mid-1960s had begun performing and touring with another band, the Eyeball Wine Company with Roger Brant on bass and George Dobo on guitar and piano. An album, Joe Hall and the Eyeball Wine Company, was recorded in 1972 and released as a CD many years later. An earlier record, produced by Bob Ezrin, was never released. His first release was an album entitled H J Boenke, his birth name, produced by Hall and his longtime collaborator, Tony Quarrington, and engineered by Daniel and Bob Lanois, in 1976. Also playing on the album were George Dobo, keyboards; Roger Brant, bass; Mike Boyer (of the Humble Sponge), drums, and Joe Mendelson, "demented steel". The album was actually Volume 5, Number 2 of Impulse, a Canadian arts magazine edited and published by Eldon Garnet, a frequent collaborator of Hall’s in diverse realms including performance art and garden variety absurdity. In the 1970s and 1980s he led a new band, Continental Drift, composed of Hall, Tony Quarrington on guitar, George Dobo on keyboards, and additionally Paul Quarrington on bass and Martin Worthy on drums, based in Toronto, and released several more albums. Many of his later records were released independently and included new incarnations of the continental drift with J.P. Hovercraft on bass and no one at all on drums. Hall collaborated with Willie P. Bennett as well as Continental Drift members Tony Quarrington and J.P. Hovercraft as “The Screaming Vegetables” on two independent releases in the 90’s.

As well as his songs, Hall became noted for his "eccentric and often very funny stage chatter". One obituary commented on his performances: "From his then-considered daring stage apparel (a kilt-like skirt with workboots and oversized flowing bow tie, for example...) to his Zappaesque monologues and asides during songs, he seemed to do whatever came to mind with no regard for decorum or convention, his aim solely on the integrity of his artistic expression."

From the late 1980s he lived in Peterborough, Ontario. He continued to perform, and recorded and mentored younger musicians. He died at home in 2019, aged 71, after suffering from liver cancer for several years.

== Bibliography ==
- Hans Wurst songs by: Joe Hall (1990)

== Discography ==
- Joe Hall and the Eyeball Wine Company (1972)
- H J Boenke (1976)
- Joe Hall and the Continental Drift (1977) *
- On the Avenue (1978) *
- Drinking with the Continental Drift (1979) *
- Rancho Banano (1980) *
- Skeleton Key (1987)
- Rapture (1993)
- Fresh Outta Rehab (1995) as Joe Hall And The Screaming Vegetables
- Travelling Without Deodorant: The Best of Joe Hall 1972–1988 (1999) Compilation
- Geezerhood (2005)
- Incontinental Drift (2007)
- Direct to Delete (2016) as Joe Hall And The Drift

* Credited to Joe Hall And The Continental Drift

== See also ==
- List of German Canadians
