= Der Luftpirat und sein lenkbares Luftschiff =

German pulp magazine published from 1908-1911

The Air Pirate and His Steerable Airship
- Author: Oskar Hoffmann (possibly)
- Language: German
- Publication date: 1908-1911
- Publication place: Germany

Der Luftpirat und sein lenkbares Luftschiff (The Air Pirate and His Steerable Airship) was a German pulp magazine with 165 issues from 1908–1911. The book followed the adventures of Captain Mors, the "Air Pirate".

The series was banned in 1916 together with nearly 150 other series under the military censorship apparatus. In the case of the "Luftpirat" and some other series, the production plates were destroyed so the series couldn't be reprinted after the end of the First World War.

A print on demand edition was published in 2005, edited by Heinz J. Galle, containing issues 1, 40, 42, 56, 63, and 66. In the preface, Heinz J. Galle attributes the work to Oskar Hoffmann, however this contradicts Lexikon der deutschen Science Fiction & Fantasy by Klaus Geus.

An English version was published by Striped Entertainment in 2026, containing restored artwork and newly translated and annotated text, of issues 1, 40, 42, 56, 63, and 66.

== List of titles ==
1. Der Beherrscher der Lüfte
2. Ein Kampf um Millionen
3. Kapitän Mors in Indien
4. Der Luftpirat im Diamantenlande
5. Abenteuer im unbekannten Lande
6. Der Schatz im feuerspeienden Berge
7. Das Geheimnis des Japaners
8. Die Meuterei in der Mandschurei
9. Die geheimnisvolle Insel des Kapitän Mors
10. Der unheimliche Ingenieur
11. Das lenkbare Luftschiff im Wirbelsturm
12. Ein Kampf in den Lüften
13. Das geheimnisvolle Bergwerk des Kapitän Mors
14. Der Elfenbeinschatz im Polarmeer
15. Die Rache des Malayen
16. Kapitän Mors als Gefangener
17. Ein Zweikampf zwischen Himmel und Erde
18. Kapitän Mors und die Verräter
19. Der unheimliche Wolkenkratzer
20. Der Millionenschatz-Turm des Tyrannen
21. Das Gefängnis auf der Teufelsinsel
22. Kapitän Mors´ schwerste Stunde
23. Das Geheimnis des Bergschlosses
24. Die Rache des Gouverneurs
25. Der Felsen des Todes
26. Die Gespenster-Eisenbahnbrücke am Schaho
27. Der Gold-Berg im Korallen-Meer
28. Der Sprengstoff des alten Mongolen-Zauberers
29. Das Diamantfeld in Transvaal
30. Die Spionin auf dem lenkbaren Luftschiff
31. Das Rätsel des Sulioten-Berges
32. Kapitän Mors erste Fahrt im Weltenfahrzeug
33. Das lenkbare Luftschiff im Geistergebirge
34. Kapitän Mors im Meteorstein-Regen
35. Im Kampf mit dem japanischen Luftschiff
36. Eine Fahrt mit dem Tode
37. Auf den Schienen der Wüstenbahn
38. Kapitän Mors Feind im Weltenraum
39. Die geheimnisvolle Zerstörungsmaschine
40. Die Empörung im Weltenfahrzeuge
41. Ein Kampf zwischen lenkbaren Luftschiffen
42. Im Todeskrater der neuen Planeten
43. Der Luftpirat unter dem Meere
44. Im Bannkreis der Vernichtung
45. Zwischen erbarmunslosen Feinden
46. Die Geheimnisse des Meteoriten
47. Der Turm des Todes von Damaskus
48. Die geheimnisvolle Flugmaschine
49. Die Reise nach dem Feuer-Planeten
50. Der Luftpirat am Nordpol
51. Wie Kapitän Mors seinen Todfeind vernichtete
52. Der Kampf mit den Bewohnern des Kriegs-Planeten
53. Der Luftpirat und die geheimnisvollen Waldräuber
54. Ein Verzweiflungskampf im Weltraum
55. Der Luftpirat beim Erdbeben von Messina
56. Die Weltenfahrer auf dem Riesen-Planeten
57. Ein Duell über den Wolken
58. Eine Rebellion in der Sternenwelt
59. Der unheimliche Hochofen
60. Abenteuer in der Welt des Todes
61. Die Vernichtungsschlacht in den Lüften
62. Das geheimnisvolle Haus auf dem Monde
63. Die Schreckensfahrt des Weltenfahrzeugs
64. Die Todesfahrt auf dem Mars-Kanal
65. Der Luftpirat auf dem Pariser Eiffelturm
66. Das Weltenfahrzeug zwischen den Riesen-Kometen
67. Die Feuerberge der geheimnisvollen Welt
68. Die Krater-Seen des unbekannten Planeten
69. Das Gespenster-Luftschiff des Amerikaners
70. Die geheimnisvollen Feindinnen des Kapitän Mors
71. Das Nebel-Luftschiff des Empörers
72. Der Untergang einer unbekannten Welt
73. In Fesseln auf brennendem Ballon
74. Die geraubte Fürstentochter
75. Der furchtbarste Kampf des Luftpiraten
76. Die Rätsel des unsichtbaren Planeten
77. Das seltsame Panzer-Luftschiff
78. In der Welt des Grausens
79. Das Duell der lenkbaren Luftschiffe
80. Der Tempel in der Mondlandschaft Plato
81. Die Geheimnisse des Luftpiraten
82. Die Luftfahrt auf der Metall-Platte
83. In den Krallen des Todes
84. Am Ende der Sonnenwelt
85. Der Geisterwald in der Mandschurei
86. Die letzte Reise des Weltenfahrzeugs
87. Zwischen Leben und Tod
88. Die geheimnisvolle Unterseemine
89. Kapitän Mors im Kampf mit Meuterern
90. Die Jagd nach der Dokumententasche
91. Ein Kampf um die Herrschaft in den Lüften
92. Der Geheimbund des Todes
93. Der Rebellen-General und sein Opfer
94. Der Totenkopf in der Kajüte
95. Die Gespensterschlucht in Arizona
96. Kriegsschiff und Flugmaschine
97. Rettung in letzter Stunde
98. Die Rache eines Weibes
99. Der geheimnisvolle Luftballon
100. Abenteuer im Lande der Freiheit
101. Das geheimnisvolle Goldbergwerk in Alaska
102. Der Tod im Weltenraum
103. Die Insel der Schrecken
104. Ein Entscheidungskampf über den Wolken
105. Die Töchter des Rajah
106. Der Schrecken im Sudan
107. Die verschollene Nordpolarexpedition
108. Das Geheimnis des verfallenen Schlosses
109. Im Feuerstrom des Halley-Planeten
110. Die Flugmaschine in den Meereswogen
111. Der Zwingherr des freien Bergvolkes
112. Das Geheimnis der Mondwelt
113. In Sibiriens Einöden
114. Das Lynchgericht zu Denver
115. Die Feinde der Erdbewohner
116. Die Todesfahrt mit dem Wahnsinnigen
117. Der Schrecken der Sierra
118. Die Selenitenfestung auf dem Monde
119. Die rätselhafte Flugmaschine
120. Die Fahrt in die Urwelt
121. Die Meuterei auf dem lenkbaren Luftschiff
122. Die Geheimnisse des Planeten Mars
123. Die Sträflingsinsel im Stillen Ozean
124. Mit dem Panzerboot in die Marswelt
125. An der Schwelle des Todes
126. Abenteuer auf dem neuen Planeten Vulkan
127. Die Luftflotte und ihr Besieger
128. Auf dem Krystall-Mond des Saturn
129. Die Luftschiffstation in der Wildnis
130. Der geheimnisvolle Detektiv
131. Das Geheimnis der schwarzen Felsen
132. Die Fahrt durch die Sternschnuppen
133. Das Luftschiff der Nebelberge
134. Die Signalstation am Mondkrater Cassini
135. Das Rätsel der Teufelsinsel
136. Die Verschollenen auf dem Mars
137. Der Schatz im alten spanischen Bergwerk
138. Der geheimnisvolle Mondkrater
139. Zwischen Himmel und Erde
140. Im Urmeer des fernsten Planeten
141. Der Eisenbahnzug im brennenden Walde
142. Das Weltenfahrzeug im Tal des Grausens
143. Der Perlenschatz im Indischen Ozean
144. Die Weltreise nach dem Feuerplaneten
145. Die Verschwörung der Geheimbündler
146. Im Reich des ewigen Todes
147. Inmitten entfesselter Naturgewalten
148. In den Wüsteneien des Mars
149. Der Panzerturm auf dem Schreckenskap
150. Die Götzenmauer im Mondkrater
151. Kapitän Mors und die Nachtreiter
152. Die Gletscherfee von Nanda-Devi
153. Die Flugmaschine in der Tundra
154. Die furchtbarste Stunde des Luftpiraten
155. Im Hinterhalt des Geheimpolizisten
156. Ohne Steuer im Weltenraum
157. Die Fahrt ins Verderben
158. Der Untergang des Weltenfahrzeug
159. Im Gletschereis begraben
160. Der Kampf um das Luftschiffmodell
161. Zwischen Leben und Tod
162. Das geheimnisvolle Weltenfahrzeug
163. Der Todesweg im lenkbaren Luftschiff
164. Im Kampf mit dem Todfeinde
165. Die Stunde der Entscheidung

== Literature ==
- Peter Wanjek (1993). Bibliographie der deutschen Heftromane 1900–1945 (in German). Wilfersdorf. pp. 79–81.
- Heinz J. Galle (2009). Der Luftpirat und sein lenkbares Luftschiff (in German) (2. ed.). Lüneburg. ISBN 978-3-940679-28-4.
- Heinz J. Galle (2006). Vom Kaiserreich zum "Dritten Reich" – 40 Jahre populäre Lesestoffe (in German). Vol. 2. Lüneburg. p. 92. ISBN 3-940679-22-4.

== Adaptations ==
=== League of Extraordinary Gentlemen ===
Captain Mors, labelled a "notorious air-pirate" is referenced in Allan Moore's comic The League of Extraordinary Gentlemen Volume 1.
