= The Honeytrap =

- Directed by: Michael G. Gunther
- Written by: Michael G. Gunther
- Produced by: FGFH / M. Lim
- Starring: Emily Lloyd; Valerie Edmond; Anthony Green; Stuart McQuarrie; Natalie Walter
- Music by: Dominik Scherrer
- Distributed by: Striped Entertainment
- Release date: 5 July 2002
- Running time: 86 minutes
- Country: United Kingdom
- Language: English
- Budget: USD$ 2,250,000

The Honeytrap is a 2002 British thriller film featuring Emily Lloyd as Catherine, a young woman about to marry her fiancé in London. It was written and directed by Michael G. Gunther and shot in London, England. It also stars Anthony Green, Valerie Edmond, Stuart McQuarrie and Natalie Walter.

== Synopsis ==
A woman is forced to confront her dark side when she investigates her husband's suspected infidelity.

Catherine (Emily Lloyd) returns to London to marry Jonathan (Anthony Green), whom she has only recently met. She moves into his apartment, and meets her next-door neighbor, Renee (Valerie Edmond), who soon becomes her friend and confidante.

When the first cracks start to appear in her relationship with Jonathan, Catherine starts to doubt his fidelity. Renee introduces her to Jeremy (Stuart McQuarrie), a private detective. Jeremy proposes setting up a "honeytrap" for Jonathan, a meeting with an attractive woman (Natalie Walter) to test his faithfulness. Catherine agrees to the test, but after a video surveillance reveals Jonathan's innocence, she feels embarrassed and tries to cut off her relationship with the detective.

Catherine and Jonathan get married, and on return from the honeymoon, all seems to be going well. But, slowly, Catherine's doubts about Jonathan start coming back. Anonymous telephone calls and nightly visits from Jeremy threaten to disturb the couple's happiness; and when Catherine receives photos of the woman from the "honeytrap" and her husband having an intimate dinner together, she is thrown back into her old paranoia, only this time it seems warranted.

As she sets to discover the truth about her husband, events take an altogether more sinister turn.
