= Michael Gunther =

Producer, director and writer

Michael Gunther is a producer, director and writer.

Gunther started out in feature films after working as a commercials director in Europe. He later started producing TV documentaries with his own company, including a portrait of the painter Hans Falk and an account of the 1999 İzmit earthquake in Turkey. He wrote and directed The Honeytrap, starring British actress Emily Lloyd, in 2002.

He produced a number of independent features and shorts. Most recently he was co-producer for the feature film Anamorph, directed by Henry Miller and starring Willem Dafoe, Scott Speedman, Peter Stormare and Clea DuVall.

In 2006, he set up a New York-based production company named Triboro Pictures with Sirad Balducchi.

== Filmography ==
- The Honeytrap
- Anamorph
- She Wolf Rising
- Brief Reunion
- Quitters
- Quarter Life Crisis
- I Remember You Now...
- The Dueling Accountant
- Hans Falk - Painting the Light
