= Francie Swift =

American actress (born 1969/1970)

- Born: 1969 or 1970 (age 56–57); Amarillo, Texas, U.S.
- Education: State University of New York, Purchase (BFA)
- Occupations: Film and television actress
- Years active: 1986–present
- Spouse: Brad Blumenfeld
- Children: 2

Francie Swift (born 1969/1970) is an American actress best known for her role as Cynthia in Thoroughbreds and her recurring roles as Haylie Grimes on Outsiders and Anne Vanderbilt Archibald on Gossip Girl.

== Life and career ==
Swift was born in Amarillo, Texas. She began acting as a child at the Amarillo Theatre School for Children. Prior to her senior year in high school, Swift left Amarillo to attend the Interlochen Center for the Arts in Michigan. Swift then attended State University of New York at Purchase, then settled in New York City.

Swift had roles in several plays from 1997 to 2002. In 1997, Swift starred alongside Amy Ryan and Peter Dinklage in Marking, a black comedy by Patrick Breen. In 1998, Swift had a leading role in Whale Music, a play by Anthony Minghella. In 2000, Swift starred in Tooth, a theater production in New York. In 2002, she starred in Richard Greenberg's play, The Dazzle, alongside Peter Frechette.

On Gossip Girl, Swift had a recurring role as Anne Vanderbilt Archibald, the mother of Nate Archibald. From 2010-2011, Swift played Sherrie West, an assistant district attorney on Law & Order: Special Victims Unit. She had a recurring role as Haylie Grimes in the Outsiders. In 2017, Swift played Cynthia in Thoroughbreds, which was played at Sundance Film Festival.

== Personal life ==
Swift lives in New York City with her husband, Brad Blumenfeld, and their two sons.

== Filmography ==
=== Film ===
Year	Title	Role	Notes	Ref.
1986	Vamp	Dominique		
1989	Chill Factor	Pool Babe		
1991	Ambition		Short film	
1992	Scent of a Woman	Flight Attendant		
1994	The Cowboy Way	Desk Clerk at Waldorf Astoria		
1995	The Scarlet Letter	Sally Short		
1997	Fall	Robin		
1997	Lifebreath	Chrystie Devoe		
2001	A Day in Black and White			
2001	World Traveler	Joanie		
2002	Two Weeks Notice	Lauren Wade		
2002	Stella Shorts 1998-2002	Santa's Wife	Direct-to-video	
2006	Heavens Fall	Belle Leibowitz		
2007	Descent	Clair	Uncredited	
2010	Cop Out	Pam		
2010	All Good Things	Kelly Callender		
2011	Brief Reunion	Gitta		
2017	Thoroughbreds	Cynthia		

=== Television ===
Year	Title	Role	Notes	Ref.
1995, 1999, 2009, 2022	Law & Order	various	4 episodes	
1995	The Wright Verdicts		Episode: "Unlucky Star"	
1996	Kiss & Tell	Kelly Krieger	TV movie	
1997	Liberty!	Baroness von Riedesel	Miniseries, main cast	
1998	Homicide: Life on the Street	Helen Montgomery	Episode: "Strangled, Not Stirred"	
1998	Soldier of Fortune, Inc.	Roxanne Mitchell	Episode: "Spyder's Web"	
1999	Due South	Luanne Russell	Episode: "A Likely Story"	
2000	The Great Gatsby	Jordan Baker	TV movie	
2001, 2002	A Nero Wolfe Mystery	various	6 episodes	
2003	Hack	Jennifer Holt	Episode: "Presumed Guilty"	
2004	NTSB: The Crash of Flight 323		TV movie	
2004	Law & Order: Criminal Intent	Nelda Carlson	Episode: "Semi-Detached"	
2005	CSI: Miami	Laura Gannon	Episode: "Blood in the Water	
2007	Six Degrees	Olivia Keeling	Episode: "Objects in the Mirror"	
2007	Damages	Holly Frobisher	2 episodes	
2007–2011	Gossip Girl	Anne Vanderbilt Archibald	Recurring role (seasons 1–2, 4)	
2009–2010	The Good Wife	Kya Poole	Recurring role (season 1)	
2010	Gravity	Amanda	2 episodes	
2010	White Collar	Renee Simmons	Episode: "Withdrawal"	
2010–2011	Law & Order: Special Victims Unit	A.D.A. Sherri West	Recurring role (seasons 12–13)	
2012	Person of Interest	Sabrina Drake	Episode: "Til Death"	
2013	House of Cards	Felicity Holburn	4 episodes	
2013	Elementary	Katie Sutter	Episode: "Risk Management"	
2013	Hostages	Nina Carlisle	Recurring role (season 1)	
2014	Sleepy Hollow	Beth Lancaster	Episode: "Where I Send Thee"	
2016	Outsiders	Haylie Grimes	Recurring role	
2019	Bull	Dr. Julia Martin	Episode: "Split Hairs"	
2023	The Blacklist	Blair Foster	Episode: "Blair Foster"	
