= Whale Music (film) =

- Directed by: Richard J. Lewis
- Written by: Paul Quarrington; Richard J. Lewis
- Produced by: Steven DeNure; Raymond Massey
- Starring: Maury Chaykin; Cyndy Preston; Paul Gross
- Cinematography: Vic Sarin
- Edited by: Richard Martin
- Music by: George Blondheim; Rheostatics
- Production company: Cape Scott Motion Pictures
- Distributed by: Alliance Communications Corporation
- Release dates: September 8, 1994 (TIFF); November 4, 1994 (Canada)
- Running time: 107 min.
- Country: Canada
- Language: English
- Box office: $39,129 (US/Canada)

Whale Music is a 1994 Canadian comedy-drama film directed by Richard J. Lewis and starring Maury Chaykin, Cyndy Preston, and Paul Gross. It is based on the comic novel of the same name by Paul Quarrington, who also wrote the screenplay.

The film premiered at the 1994 Toronto International Film Festival.

== Plot ==
The film stars Maury Chaykin as Desmond Howl, a former rock star who has lived in seclusion in a seaside mansion since the death of his brother Danny (Paul Gross) in a car accident. Howl spends his time composing a symphonic masterpiece for the whales who congregate in the ocean near his property. His reason for this is revealed in the title of one of his songs, "Have You Seen My Brother?" — Danny died by losing control of his car and driving off a cliff into the ocean.

One day, however, Howl awakens to find Claire (Cyndy Preston), a mysterious young woman, in his living room. Although Howl's world is disrupted, Claire ends up inspiring him to complete the symphony, to write his first great pop song in years, and to begin seeking connections with people again.

The character of Desmond Howl is based largely on Brian Wilson.

The cast also includes Kenneth Welsh, Jennifer Dale, Jim Byrnes, and Quarrington in a cameo appearance as a bartender.

== Cast ==
- Maury Chaykin as Desmond Howl
- Cynthia Preston as Claire Lowe (credited as Cyndy Preston)
- Paul Gross as Daniel Howl
- Jennifer Dale as Fay Ginzburg-Howl
- Kenneth Welsh as Kenneth Sextone
- Blu Mankuma as "Mookie" Saunders
- Alan Jordan as Sal Goneau
- Tom Lavin as Monty Mann
- Jim Byrnes as Dewey Moore
- Deborah Duchene as Bobby Sue
- Paul Quarrington as Pete, The Bartender
- Janne Mortil as Star
- Suzanne Ristic as Monty's Wife
- Roman Podhora as Prison Guard
- Sherri Wong as Groupie
- Arlene Warren as Groupie
- Jacqueline A. Gauthier as Waitress
- Stephanie Blumer as Dancer

== Soundtrack ==
Music for the film was written by Rheostatics and released on the soundtrack album Music from the Motion Picture Whale Music. The song "Claire" was a Top 40 hit for the band in 1995. Quarrington had chosen the Rheostatics to compose the soundtrack because he had liked their 1992 album Whale Music, which was itself inspired by Quarrington's novel.

== Reception ==
The film opened in eight Canadian theaters on November 4, 1994 and grossed almost $20,000 in its opening week. It went on to gross $39,129.

== Awards ==
Award	Date of ceremony	Category	Recipient(s) and nominee(s)	Result	Ref(s)
Genie Awards	1994	Best Motion Picture	Whale Music	Nominated	
Genie Awards	1994	Best Achievement in Direction	Richard J. Lewis	Nominated	
Genie Awards	1994	Best Actor in a Leading Role	Maury Chaykin	Won	
Genie Awards	1994	Best Adapted Screenplay	Paul Quarrington and Richard J. Lewis	Nominated	
Genie Awards	1994	Best Overall Sound	Daryl Powell, Dean Giammarco, Bill Sheppard and Paul A. Sharpe	Won	
Genie Awards	1994	Best Sound Editing	Cal Shumiatcher, Eric Hill, Marti Richa, Issac Strozberg and Shane Shemko	Won	
Genie Awards	1994	Best Original Score	George Blondheim	Nominated	
Genie Awards	1994	Best Original Song	Rheostatics, "Claire"	Won	
Genie Awards	1994	Best Original Song	Rheostatics, "Song of Courtship"	Nominated	
