= Oskar Hoffmann (author) =

German writer

Oskar Hoffmann (October 29, 1866 in Gotha – December 21, 1928 in Wiesbaden) was a German author of science fiction novels.

Der Luftpirat und sein Lenkbares Luftschiff has been attributed to him.
