= Joel de la Fuente =

American actor (born 1969)

- Born: New Hartford, New York, U.S.
- Education: Brown University (BA); New York University (MFA)
- Occupation: Actor
- Years active: 1992–present
- Spouse: Melissa Bowen (m. 2000)
- Children: 2
- Website: www.joeldelafuente.com

Joel de la Fuente is an American actor. He first gained recognition for his role as 1st Lieutenant Paul Wang in Space: Above and Beyond, and is best known for his roles as Dr. Johann Pryce in Hemlock Grove, Kempeitai Chief Inspector Takeshi Kido in The Man in the High Castle and recurring appearances on Law & Order: Special Victims Unit as Technical Assistance Response Unit Tech Ruben Morales and General Sam Lane in My Adventures with Superman. He recently played Mark Nava in William Atticus Parker's 2025 film Atrabilious.

== Early life and education ==
De la Fuente was born in New Hartford, New York, the middle of three boys born to Filipino immigrant parents; his older brother is two years older and his younger brother is six years younger. He has a mixture of Portuguese, Spanish, Filipino, Malaysian, & Chinese descent and grew up in Evanston, Illinois, and graduated from North Shore Country Day School in Winnetka, Illinois, in 1987. He received his BA degree in theatre arts in 1991 from Brown University, and his MFA degree in 1994 from NYU's graduate acting program at the Tisch School of the Arts.

== Personal life ==
De la Fuente met his wife Melissa Bowen while performing in Shakespeare in the Park. They married in June 2000. They have two daughters, Elena (born 2001) and Tallulah (born 2006).

== Filmography ==
=== Film ===
- Roommates (1995) as Toby
- Personal Velocity: Three Portraits (2002) as Thavi Matola
- The Happening (2008) as Realtor
- Taking Chance (2009) as Ticketing Agent
- The Adjustment Bureau (2011) as Thompson's aide
- Brief Reunion (2011) as Aaron
- Forgetting the Girl (2012) as Derek
- Julia (2014) as Dr. Lin
- Ava's Possessions (2015) as Escobar
- Red Sparrow (2018) as U.S. Senator
- The Same Storm (2021) as John Park
- Atrabilious (2023) as Mark Nava

=== Television ===
- Due South (1994) as Charlie Wong (Episode "Chinatown")
- Space: Above and Beyond (1995–1996) as Lt. Paul Wang (main role)
- High Incident (1996) as Detective Aquino (3 episodes)
- When the Cradle Falls (1997) as Bill Avila (TV Movie)
- ER (1997) as Med Student Ivan Fu (2 episodes)
- 100 Centre Street (2001–2002) as Peter Davies (12 episodes)
- Law & Order: Special Victims Unit (2002–2011) as TARU Tech Ruben Morales (52 episodes)
- All My Children (2007) as Seamus Wong (4 episodes)
- Canterbury's Law (2008) as Assistant Attorney General Peter Upton (2 episodes)
- Nurse Jackie (2011) as a priest (1 episode)
- Hemlock Grove (2013–2015) as Dr. Johann Pryce (main role)
- Blue Bloods (2015) as Edward Gomez (Episode: "Flags of Our Fathers")
- The Man in the High Castle (2015–2019) as Chief Inspector Kido (main role, 39 episodes)
- Limitless (2016) as Daniel Lee (Episode: "A Dog's Breakfast")
- Madam Secretary (2017–2019) as President Datu Andrada (3 episodes)
- Bull (2017) as Brent Janson (Episode: "How to Dodge a Bullet")
- Manifest (2018–2020) as Dr. Brian Cardoso (2 episodes)
- The Blacklist (2019) as Dr. Guillermo Rizal (Episode: "Guillermo Rizal")
- Prodigal Son (2021) as Ramón Vieja (Episode: "Head Case")
- Power Book III: Raising Kanan (2021) as Captain Cristano Peralta (2 episodes)
- Devils (2022) as Cheng Liwei (8 episodes)
- The Good Doctor (2022) as Jacob (Episode: "Growth Opportunities")
- The Mysterious Benedict Society (2022) as Officer "Cannonball" Zhao (2 episodes)
- Hello Tomorrow! (2023) as Bill Blankenship (Episode: "The Numbers Behind the Numbers")
- My Adventures with Superman (2023–present) as General Sam Lane (voice, recurring role)
- The Walking Dead: Daryl Dixon (2023–2024) as Losang (main role, 6 episodes)
- Tempest (2025) as TBA (3 episodes)
- High Potential (2025) as Greg Foster (2 episodes)

=== Video games ===
- The Warriors (2005) as Additional Civilian
- Homefront (2011) as Hopper Lee

=== Theatre ===
- Hold These Truths (2018) as Gordon Hirabayashi, others

== See also ==
- Filipinos in the New York City metropolitan region
