= The Spirit Cabinet =

1999 novel by Paul Quarrington

- Cover of First Edition
- Author: Paul Quarrington
- Genre: Psychological fiction
- Publisher: Random House of Canada
- Publication date: 1999
- Pages: 352
- ISBN: 9780679309857
- OCLC: 40151311
- Dewey Decimal: 813/.54
- LC Class: PR9199.3.Q34 S65

The Spirit Cabinet is a novel by Paul Quarrington about two oddball Las Vegas magicians. It was first published by Random House of Canada in 1999.
