= Whale Music (novel) =

1989 novel by Paul Quarrington

First edition

Whale Music is a novel by Canadian writer Paul Quarrington. It was first published by Doubleday Canada in 1989.

The novel's protagonist is Desmond Howl, a reclusive former rock star. He has lived in isolation since his brother, Danny, died in a car accident. Rather than engaging with the outside world, Howl spends his time composing symphonies for the pod of whales that congregate near his dilapidated seaside retreat. Howl's life is turned upside down one morning when he finds a mysterious woman named Claire asleep in his living room.

The character of Desmond Howl is loosely based on Brian Wilson.

Howl is a heavy drug user and alcoholic whose diet mainly consists of jelly-filled doughnuts. This lifestyle gives Howl a false sense of reality and affects his short-term memory. Quarrington's nonlinear narrative aims to make the reader feel as though they are inside Desmond's mind. Paragraphs are rarely finished without distractions and topic switches. Most of the story is told through Desmond's flashbacks, giving the reader a glimpse into the reclusive rock star's past.

== Plot ==
The story begins as Desmond finds a naked woman asleep on the couch in his seaside mansion. Rarely receiving visitors, he is confused about how she entered his home. Awakening, she tells Desmond that she is Claire from Toronto. Confused, Desmond decides that Toronto must be a planet in a nearby galaxy, and that Claire is an alien. Her spaceship must have crashed into the nearby ocean, and she is on his couch seeking refuge. He tells the young "alien" that she may stay with him until she is ready to return to her home planet. Claire moves in, and starts helping Desmond with chores and running to the store so that Desmond never has to leave the house. Desmond does not receive visitors, except for his mother (who frequently shows up unannounced snooping for uncashed checks).

The narrative continues in flashbacks, revealing aspects of Desmond's childhood, including his brother Danny and an abusive father. Danny was their father's favorite. Their father's deep interest in everything Danny did often causes Danny to give up hobbies, as the pressure overwhelmed him. Desmond, however, tries hard to please his father, without success. Their father was a musician when he was younger, and had a single hit on the radio. As such, he pushed both of the boys into music. Danny quickly grew bored with it and quit, unlike Desmond, who tried to learn every instrument he could in hopes of receiving his father's approval.

Though Danny grew tired of other interests, he loved "going fast". He begins engaging in risky behavior, such as riding down big hills on his bike. After he is caught stealing a car, he is sent to a military school. While Danny is at military school, Desmond learns to play many instruments. After returning home, Desmond tries to bond with Danny by encouraging them to sing together. While Danny works on his car, Desmond would encourage him to sing with him. The pair soon write their first song about Danny's car, called "Torque, Torque." Their father hears them playing and pushes them to start a band, declaring himself their manager. While scouting for someone to help mix their music, they meet "Fred the Head". Fred is passionate about mixing songs, and shows Desmond how to do it. Desmond spends hours locked away with Fred, mixing songs. Their father finds a record label that signs the boys, and they release their first song, which quickly rises to the top of the charts.

Their father then decides that the boys need additional band members who fit the "California look". He puts out an ad for teenage musicians. As the band rises to stardom, the boys start doing drugs and drinking heavily. The majority of the band members also engage in promiscuous sexual activity with the groupies who follow them. Desmond, on the other hand, never preoccupies himself with women. Instead, he prefers to just drink, do drugs, and play music.

Flashbacks reveal that Desmond married Faye, a groupie. While married to her, Desmond stopped his heavy partying and acquired an office job where he wrote songs all day. One day, he went home and found Faye in bed with their mutual friend, Farley O'Keefe. He kicks Faye out, and begins his voluntary seclusion - staying home, drinking, and getting high.

Danny, while driving drunk, plunges off a cliff. This proves to be Desmond's last straw. He completely withdraws from the outside world, refuses to leave his home, and no longer allows visitors. His drug habit worsens as he avoids reality. The drugs damage his short-term memory. As his isolation continues, he begins experiencing vivid hallucinations. He spends all of his time on his passion project, writing "Whale Music" for the whales that often swim by his seaside home. It is the only thing that brings him joy.

In the present day, he finds Claire. Things go well with Claire until she invites Desmond's friends over for dinner. Desmond gets angry at Claire and reminds her that he does not allow visitors into his home. They get into a fight until, finally, Desmond backs down. He tells her that he is going to the studio to work on Whale Music, promising he will be back in time for dinner. When he eventually returns, dinner is over, and he and Claire fight again. Claire walks out, and Desmond goes back to Whale Music. Later, realizing that Claire hasn't returned, he decides to go after her and steps out of his house for the first time in years. Outside, a small dog runs at him, and he kicks it across the yard. The dog returns, and Desmond apologizes. Desmond promises to give the dog a steak if he follows him into town.

Desmond and the dog go to a nearby bar to look for Claire. A man offers to take Desmond to a strip club where he says he saw Claire. She is on the stage, and Desmond jumps up and demands that she return home with him. A security guard approaches, trying to kick Desmond out. Ignoring the guard, he continues trying to persuade Claire to go with him. The security guard calls out Desmond's name. Stunned, he realizes that the guard is O'Keefe. Desmond runs at Farley to punch him, but before he makes contact, the guard is already on the ground. Farley starts screaming because the dog has bitten his leg. The police are called, and Desmond and Claire are both arrested.

Desmond's record company provides him with a lawyer, and Farley agrees to not press charges. Desmond asks about Claire, but is told that she is in the country illegally and will, therefore, not be released. Desmond lies to the officer, saying they are engaged, and she is released into his care. In the parking lot, Farley approaches Desmond to ask why he's so mad at him. Desmond tells Farley that it's because of his infidelity with Faye. Farley claims that it was Danny in bed with Faye, not him. Desmond's memories then flood back. He remembers the fight and how he kicked Danny out that day, refusing to speak to him. He mourns that Danny died before he had the chance to forgive him.

Upon finishing Whale Music, Desmond has a party at his house to celebrate. They line huge speakers all over the property, pointing them towards the ocean so that the whales can hear. Desmond and Claire sit on the rocks beside the ocean, hoping for whale sightings, though none appear. Claire asks Desmond for the name of a particular song that she hadn't heard before. He tells her the song is called "Have You Guys Seen Danny?" She begins to cry, and asks Desmond why he can't be happy. Desmond replies that he wrote the songs because he never got the chance to forgive Danny.^{[1]}

== Recognition ==
- 1989 Governor General's Award for English fiction
- Shortlisted nominee for the Stephen Leacock Award in 1990.
- Adapted into a film in 1994. Quarrington co-wrote the film's screenplay, with director Richard J. Lewis, ⁣and the Canadian indie rock band Rheostatics composed the film's soundtrack.
