= John Palmer (director) =

Canadian film director (1943–2020)

John Murray Palmer (May 13, 1943 – May 15, 2020) was a Canadian theatre and film director and playwright.

Palmer was born May 13, 1943, in Sydney, Nova Scotia. Cofounder of several theatre companies in Toronto in the 1970s, Palmer was primarily a theatre director, whose credits include the original production of Brad Fraser's Wolfboy which marked the first acting role for Keanu Reeves.

Palmer directed two feature films, Me in 1975 and Sugar in 2004. He also directed/co-wrote the short film The Archer (2005), which is about the rise and fall of relationships. The film stars Kim Poirier, Dov Tiefenbach and Anthony Furey.

Palmer, who was diagnosed with vascular dementia in 2013, died of COVID-19, in Ottawa, Ontario, on May 15, 2020, at age 77, during the COVID-19 pandemic in Ottawa.

== Plays ==
- A Touch of God in the Golden Age (1971)
- The End (1972)
- A Day at the Beach (1987)
- Singapore (2001)

== Filmography ==
- Me (1975)
- Sugar (2004)
- The Archer (2005)
