= Richard J. Lewis =

Canadian television and film director

- Born: Toronto, Ontario, Canada
- Occupations: Film director, screenwriter
- Years active: 1985–present

Richard J. Lewis is a Canadian television and film director.

From 2002 to 2009, Lewis worked on the CBS television crime drama series CSI: Crime Scene Investigation as writer, director and co-executive producer.

He is best known for directing the films Whale Music (1994) and Barney's Version (2010), the latter featuring a Golden Globe winning performance by actor Paul Giamatti as well as his work on the HBO series Westworld.

== Select filmography as director ==
- Alfred Hitchcock Presents (1985)
- Superboy (1988)
- Whale Music (1994)
- Jake and the Kid (1995)
- North of 60 (1993–1997)
- Michael Hayes (1997)
- Due South (2 episodes, 1996; 1 episode, 1997)
- Little Men (1 episode, 1999)
- Justice (1999)
- Falcone (1999)
- Traders (1 episode, 2000)
- The District (1 episode, 2000)
- Family Law (3 episodes, 2000–2001)
- The Chris Isaak Show (1 episode, 2001)
- K-9: P.I. (2002) (V)
- Waterfront (1 episode, 2006)
- CSI: Crime Scene Investigation (33 episodes, 2000–2006)
- Barney's Version (2010)
- Person of Interest (2012)
- Westworld (2016–2022)
- Ransom (2017)
- A Million Little Things (2018–2023)
- The Enemy Within (2019)
- Penny Dreadful: City Of Angels (2020)
- Zoey's Extraordinary Playlist (2021)
