= Random House of Canada =

Canadian book distributor

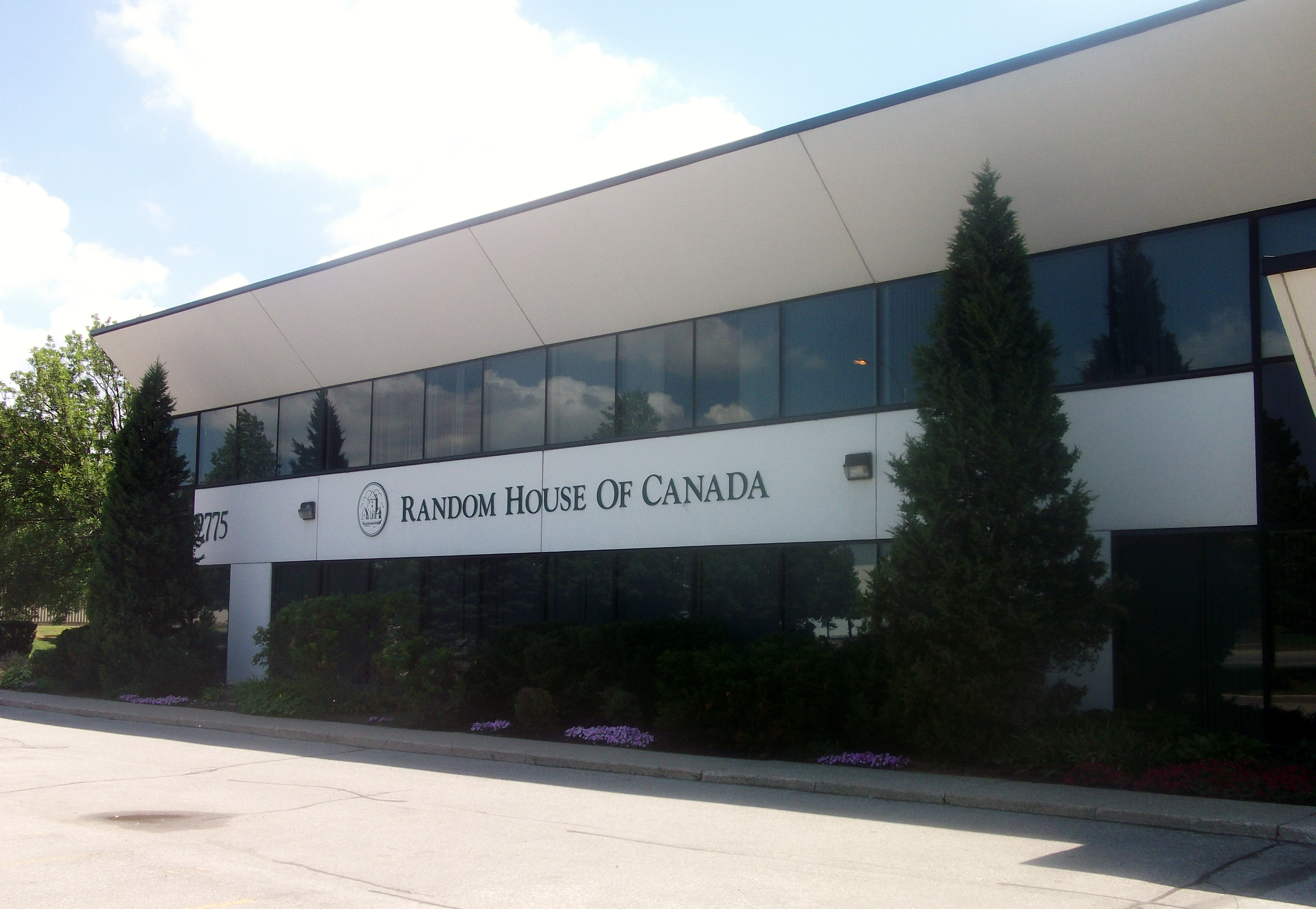
- Parent company: Random House, Inc.
- Status: Defunct (2013)
- Founded: 1944
- Successor: Penguin Random House Canada
- Country of origin: Canada
- Distribution: Canada
- Publication types: Books

Random House of Canada was the Canadian distributor for Random House, Inc. from 1944 until 2013. On July 1, 2013, it amalgamated with Penguin Canada to become Penguin Random House Canada.

== Company history ==
Random House of Canada was established in 1944 as the Canadian distributor of Random House Books. In 1986, Random House launched its Canadian publishing program. In 1998, Random House (USA) merged with another major publishing company, Bantam Doubleday Dell. Due to this international merger, both companies' Canadian branches merged as well, publishing international titles in this country as well as maintaining their Canadian publishing program. In 2012, Random House of Canada became the sole owner of fellow Canadian publishing company McClelland & Stewart, having purchased the 75% it didn't already own from the University of Toronto. In 2013, Random House's parent company, Bertelsmann, entered into a joint venture with Pearson PLC (the parent company of the Penguin Group) to form a new trade publishing company called Penguin Random House. As part of this venture Random House of Canada and Penguin Canada were amalgamated as Penguin Random House Canada. Random House of Canada, as a legal entity, is defunct.

== Imprints ==
In 2013, when Random House of Canada become defunct, it published under several imprints, including:

- Anchor Canada (paperbacks)
- Bond Street Books (international)
- Doubleday Canada
- Knopf Canada
- Random House Canada
- Seal Books
- Vintage Canada.

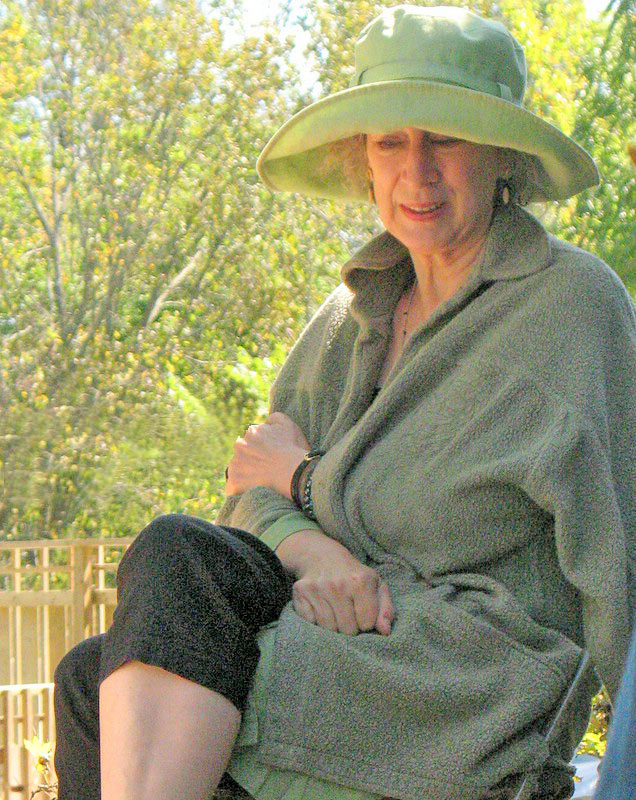
All of Margaret Atwood's novels are published in Seal editions.

Anchor Canada was created in 2001. It publishes trade paperback editions of many of Doubleday Canada's titles. In 2002, Anchor Canada published its first original trade paperback titled The Notebooks: Interviews and New Fiction from Contemporary Writers.

Bond Street Books was launched in 2006. Bond Street Books publishes international fiction and non-fiction.

Doubleday Canada publishes Canadian and international fiction and non-fiction titles from both new and established writers.

Knopf Canada was established in 1991 as an editorially independent Canadian branch of Alfred A. Knopf. The founding editor was Louise Dennys. Dennys was already the publisher of many major Canadian books, through her work at the Toronto publishing house Lester & Orpen Dennys. In 1996, Knopf Canada established a program called "The New Face of Fiction". Each year editors choose between 1 and 4 books and promote them through the campaign in order to bring some of Canada's most talented new authors to national and international attention.

The Random House Canada imprint published works by Canadian and international authors starting in 1986.

Seal Books was founded in 1977, stemming from a partnership between Bantam Books (an American-based company) and McClelland & Stewart. This imprint specializes in reprints of major fiction hardcover titles. However, Seal has always published original books; it is just not the imprint's main endeavor. In the 1980s, there was a Seal Books First Novel Award. Many Seal Books were originally published as Doubleday hardcovers. When Seal Books merged with Random House of Canada, they began publishing mass-market titles from Random House of Canada and Knopf Canada as well.

Vintage Canada was established in 1993. It takes its name from the New York–based publishing house, Vintage Books, which was formed in 1954 by Alfred A. Knopf. Vintage Canada publishes paperback editions, choosing primarily from titles originally published by Knopf Canada and Random House Canada. They also publish new books and modern classics originally published elsewhere, as well as some "Vintage Originals".

== Speakers House Canada ==
Speakers House Canada was launched in 2008 as a joint business and marketing venture between Random House of Canada and McClelland & Stewart. It was meant to serve as a vehicle for showcasing authors who were also in-demand speakers.

== Adaptations to contemporary technology ==
In October 2010, Random House of Canada introduced the "Conversation Starters" application for Apple's iPhone and iPad.

In February 2011, Random House of Canada announced a partnership with OverDrive, a digital distributor of downloadable e-books. Through this the distribution agreement, Canadian libraries, schools and colleges were able to access Random House titles through OverDrive's e-book catalog.

In 2012, the company launched the online magazine Hazlitt, which features both fiction and non-fiction writing.
