= 1994 Toronto International Film Festival =

Annual Canadian film festival

- Festival poster
- Opening film: Whale Music
- Location: Toronto, Ontario, Canada
- Hosted by: Toronto International Film Festival Group
- Festival date: September 8, 1994–September 17, 1994
- Language: English
- Website: tiff.net
- 1995 1993

The 19th Toronto International Film Festival (TIFF) took place in Toronto, Ontario, Canada between September 8 and September 17, 1994. Whale Music by Richard J. Lewis was selected as the opening film. The festival's name changed from Festival of festivals to Toronto International Film Festival.

== Awards ==
Award	Film	Director
People's Choice Award	Priest	Antonia Bird
Metro Media Award	Heavenly Creatures	Peter Jackson
Best Canadian Feature Film	Exotica	Atom Egoyan
Best Canadian Feature Film - Special Jury Citation	Double Happiness	Mina Shum
Best Canadian Feature Film - Special Jury Citation	Windigo	Robert Morin
Best Canadian Short Film	Frank's Cock	Mike Hoolboom
Best Canadian Short Film - Special Jury Citation	Technilogic Ordering	Philip Hoffman
Best Canadian Short Film - Special Jury Citation	Make Some Noise	Andrew Munger
FIPRESCI International Critics' Award	The Silences of the Palace	Moufida Tlatli
FIPRESCI International Critics' Award - Honorable Mention	Fate (Verhängnis)	Fred Kelemen

== Programme ==
=== Gala Presentation ===
- The Ascent — Donald Shebib
- Ashes of Time — Wong Kar-wai
- Bullets Over Broadway — Woody Allen
- The Burning Season — John Frankenheimer
- Captives — Angela Pope
- Chungking Express — Wong Kar-wai
- Cold Water — Olivier Assayas
- Colonel Chabert — Yves Angelo
- Eat Drink Man Woman — Ang Lee
- I Like It Like That — Darnell Martin
- Lamerica — Gianni Amelio
- Little Odessa — James Gray
- Muriel's Wedding — P. J. Hogan
- Nadja — Michael Almereyda
- Once Were Warriors — Lee Tamahori
- Il Postino: The Postman — Michael Radford
- Priest — Antonia Bird
- Second Best — Sarah Radclyffe
- The Secret of Roan Inish — John Sayles
- Sleep with Me — Rory Kelly
- The Sum of Us — Kevin Dowling & Geoff Burton
- Swimming with Sharks — George Huang
- Through the Olive Trees — Abbas Kiarostami
- Vanya on 42nd Street — Louis Malle
- Vive L'Amour — Tsai Ming-liang
- Whale Music — Richard J. Lewis

=== Special Presentations ===
- Amateur — Hal Hartley
- Curse of the Starving Class — J. Michael McClary
- Hell (L'Enfer) — Claude Chabrol
- Martha — Rainer Werner Fassbinder
- Mrs. Parker and the Vicious Circle — Alan Rudolph
- Somebody to Love — Alexandre Rockwell
- Three Colors: Red — Krzysztof Kieślowski
- To Live — Zhang Yimou
- Tsahal — Claude Lanzmann

=== Spotlight ===
- Anna: 6 - 18 — Nikita Mikhalkov
- Burnt by the Sun — Nikita Mikhalkov

=== Perspective Canada Features ===
- The Circle Game — Brigitte Berman
- Dance Me Outside — Bruce McDonald
- Double Happiness — Mina Shum
- Eclipse — Jeremy Podeswa
- Exotica — Atom Egoyan
- Frank's Cock — Mike Hoolboom
- Henry & Verlin — Gary Ledbetter
- A Hero's Life (La Vie d'un héros) — Micheline Lanctôt
- Highway of Heartache — Gregory Wild
- Max — Charles Wilkinson
- Narmada: A Valley Rises — Ali Kazimi
- Only You — Norman Jewison
- Paint Cans — Paul Donovan
- Picture of Light — Peter Mettler
- Super 8½ — Bruce LaBruce
- Valentine's Day — Mike Hoolboom
- The Wind from Wyoming (Le Vent du Wyoming) — André Forcier
- Wasaga — Judith Doyle
- Windigo — Robert Morin

=== Perspective Canada Shorts ===
- Leftovers — Janine Fung
- Make Some Noise — Andrew Munger
- Murmuration — Elizabeth Murray
- Off Key — Karethe Linaae
- Technilogic Ordering — Philip Hoffman
- You Love Me I Hate You — Rosamund Owen

=== Contemporary World Cinema ===
- Blue Sky — Tony Richardson
- Boca — Walter Avancini, Zalman King
- Dead Tired (Grosse Fatigue) — Michel Blanc
- Dear Diary — Nanni Moretti
- Fate (Verhängnis) — Fred Kelemen
- Fun — Rafal Zielinski
- Glitterbug — Derek Jarman
- Heavenly Creatures — Peter Jackson
- Leningrad Cowboys Meet Moses — Aki Kaurismäki
- Movie Days — Friðrik Þór Friðriksson
- Moving the Mountain — Michael Apted
- Tracking Down Maggie — Nick Broomfield

=== First Cinema ===
- Clerks — Kevin Smith
- Coming to Terms with the Dead (Petits arrangements avec les morts) — Pascale Ferran
- Killer — Mark Malone
- Mille Bolle Blu — Leone Pompucci
- The Shawshank Redemption — Frank Darabont
- The Silences of the Palace — Moufida Tlatli

=== Documentaries ===
- Atlantis — Luc Besson
- Hoop Dreams — Steve James
- Crumb — Terry Zwigoff
- Destiny in Space — Toni Myers
- Silent Witness — Harriet Wichin
- Tracking Down Maggie — Nick Broomfield

=== Asian Horizons ===
- A Borrowed Life — Wu Nien-jen
- The Red Lotus Society — Stan Lai

=== India Now ===
- Bandit Queen — Shekhar Kapur
- Fearless: The Hunterwali Story — Riyad Vinci Wadia
- The Kite (Patang) — Goutam Ghose
- Roja — Mani Ratnam

=== Latin American Panorama ===
- Strawberry and Chocolate — Tomás Gutiérrez Alea & Juan Carlos Tabío

=== Midnight Madness ===
- Cemetery Man — Michele Soavi
- The Eagle Shooting Heroes — Jeffrey Lau
- Love and a .45 — C.M. Talkington
- Naked Killer — Clarence Fok
- Nightwatch — Ole Bornedal
- S.F.W. — Jefery Levy
- Schramm — Jörg Buttgereit
- Tokarefu — Junji Sakamoto
- Wes Craven's New Nightmare - Wes Craven
