= Marnie McPhail =

Canadian actor

- Born: Columbus, Ohio, U.S.
- Occupations: Actress; musician
- Years active: 1981–present
- Spouse: Reed Diamond (m. 2004)

Marnie McPhail-Diamond is a Canadian actress and musician. She began her career starring as Annie Edison in the CBC Television children's series The Edison Twins (1984–1986). She later moved to the United States to star in the daytime soap operas Generations and Days of Our Lives, guest-starred in a number of prime time series, made-for-television movies and feature films most notably playing Lieutenant Eiger in Star Trek: First Contact (1996). She later starred in the Canadian legal drama The Associates (2001–02) and the animated sitcoms Braceface (2001–04) and JoJo's Circus (2003–06).

== Early life ==
McPhail was born and raised in Columbus, Ohio, U.S. Later, she moved to Toronto, Ontario, where she attended the Etobicoke School of the Arts.

== Career ==
At age 14, she was cast in her first major role as Annie Edison in the children's television series The Edison Twins (1982). She later began guest-starring in episodes of both Canadian and American television series T and T, Night Heat, L.A. Law, Dragnet, Tequila and Bonetti and Street Legal. She was a regular cast member in the daytime soap operas Generations as Carla Meyers in 1989, and Days of Our Lives as Hayley Monahan in 1992. In 1993 she made her big screen debut playing the leading role of Toronto blues singer and pianist in the drama film The Circle Game, directed by Brigitte Berman. The film premiered at the 1994 Toronto International Film Festival.

McPhail appeared in a number of made-for-television movies, notably Without Warning (1994), Body Language (1995), Evidence of Blood (1998), Dirty Pictures (2000), Haven (2001), A Town Without Christmas (2001), Tagged: The Jonathan Wamback Story (2002), and RFK (2002) playing Ethel Kennedy. She played Lieutenant Eiger in the science fiction film Star Trek: First Contact (1996) and appeared in films Grizzly Falls (1999), The Last Producer (2000), Sugar (2004) and The Greatest Game Ever Played (2005). On television, she also guest-starred on Murder One, Space: Above and Beyond, Star Trek: Voyager, ER, Silk Stalkings, The X Files, Sliders, Soul Food and Queer as Folk. She starred in the Canadian legal drama The Associates (2001–02) and the British political thriller The State Within (2006).

After starring in the 2007 made-for-television movie Stir of Echoes: The Homecoming, McPhail took a break from acting. She returned to screen in 2021 with appearances in Hallmark Channel movies. In 2023 she appeared in the black comedy film Dream Scenario and had a recurring role in the science fiction thriller Orphan Black: Echoes. Also in 2023 she began appearing in a recurring role in the Hallmark Channel drama series, The Way Home.

== Personal life ==
In 2004, McPhail married actor Reed Diamond, whom she met in 2002 on the set of Lifetime television movie Scared Silent. They have one daughter.

== Filmography ==
This list of movies, shows, and games is incomplete. You can help by adding to the list.

| Year | Work | Role | Notes |
|---|---|---|---|
| 1984–1986 | The Edison Twins | Annie Edison | Debut; children's TV series |
| 1991 | Deadly Medicine | Helen McKay | |
| 1993 | Kiss of a Killer | Betty | |
| 1994 | The Circle Game | Monika | |
| 1994 | Without Warning | Donna Hastings | |
| 1995 | Renegade | Julie Seaton | Episode: "Liar's Poker" |
| 1996 | Star Trek: Borg | Anastastia Targus | Video game |
| 1996 | Star Trek: Voyager | Alcia | Live-action TV |
| 1996 | Star Trek: First Contact | Inge Eiger | Live-action film |
| 1996 | The Uninvited | Halley | |
| 1997 | Blood Evidence | Edna Mae Kinley | Live-action film |
| 1997 | Born Bad | Loan officer | |
| 1997 | Freaky Stories | Narrator | Segment: "The Babysitter" |
| 1997 | Nights Below Station Street | Myhrra | |
| 1998 | Evidence of Blood | Edna Mae Kinley | |
| 1998 | Mind Games | Cora | |
| 1998 | Beyond Belief: Fact or Fiction (Segment: "The Bucket") | Maggie | Live-action TV series |
| 1999 | Grizzly Falls | Mother | |
| 2000 | Dirty Pictures | Reising | |
| 2000 | One True Love | Lucy Pearl | |
| 2001 | A Town Without Christmas | Isabel | Live-action film |
| 2001 | Stolen Miracle | Karen Lewis | |
| 2001 | The Associates | Cindy Baxter | Live-action TV |
| 2001–2004 | Braceface | Maria Wong (voice) | Animated series |
| 2002 | Hell on Heels: The Battle of Mary Kay | Brooke | |
| 2002 | RFK | Ethel Kennedy | Live-action film |
| 2002 | Scared Silent | Lynn Jordan | |
| 2003 | Blue Murder | Roseanne Svoboda | |
| 2003 | Wild Card | Barb Miller | |
| 2003 | The Piano Man's Daughter | Young Lily Kilworth | |
| 2003 | I Want a Dog | (voice) | Animated short |
| 2003–2006 | JoJo's Circus | Peaches (voice) | Animated series |
| 2003–2004 | Queer as Folk | Rita Montgomery | |
| 2004 | Sugar | Madge | |
| 2005 | The Greatest Game Ever Played | Mary Ouimet | Live-action film |
| 2005–2008 | Delilah & Julius | (voice) | Animated series |
| 2006 | The State Within | George Blake | TV mini-series |
| 2007 | Standoff | Sarah | |
| 2007 | Stir of Echoes: The Homecoming | Molly Cogan | Live-action film |
| 2022 | Murdoch Mysteries | Daisy Stewart | |
| 2023 | Dream Scenario | Claire | |
| 2023 | Orphan Black: Echoes | Dr. Pam Teller | 3 episodes |
| 2023 | Beacon 23 | Kaneddy | |
| 2023–present | The Way Home | Rita Richards | Live-action TV |
| 2024 | Longing | | Post-Production |
| 2024 | Trap | Jody's Mom | Completed |

== Awards and nominations ==
| Year | Award | Category | Title of work | Result | Ref. |
|---|---|---|---|---|---|
| 1986 | Gemini Award | Best Performance by a Lead Actress in a Continuing Dramatic Series | The Edison Twins | Won | |
| 2001 | Gemini Award | Best Performance by an Actress in a Featured Supporting Role in a Dramatic Series | The Associates (for episode #1.11: "Killing the Rat") | Nominated | |
| 2002 | Gemini Award | Best Performance by an Actress in a Featured Supporting Role in a Dramatic Series | The Associates | Nominated | |
