= Hugh Hefner: Playboy, Activist and Rebel =

- Theatrical poster
- Directed by: Brigitte Berman
- Screenplay by: Brigitte Berman
- Produced by: Victor Solnicki; Brigitte Berman; Peter Raymont
- Starring: Hugh Hefner; Jenny McCarthy; Dick Cavett; Ruth Westheimer (Dr. Ruth); Shannon Tweed
- Cinematography: John Westheuser
- Edited by: Brigitte Berman; Richard Vandentillaart
- Music by: James Mark Stewart
- Production company: Metaphor Films
- Distributed by: Phase 4
- Release dates: 12 September 2009 (Toronto International Film Festival); 6 August 2010 (Canada)
- Running time: 124 minutes
- Country: Canada
- Language: English
- Box office: $10,000

Hugh Hefner: Playboy, Activist and Rebel is a 2009 documentary film directed by Brigitte Berman about Hugh Hefner, creator of Playboy magazine. Berman previously directed the Academy Award-winning documentary Artie Shaw: Time Is All You've Got.

== Selected cast ==
The documentary includes clips and interviews with:

- Hugh Hefner
- Josh White
- Dizzy Gillespie
- Sammy Davis Jr
- Joan Baez
- Jim Brown
- Dick Cavett
- Pat Boone
- Susan Brownmiller
- Gene Simmons
- Jenny McCarthy
- Mike Wallace
- Dick Gregory
- Tony Curtis
- Shannon Tweed
- Jesse Jackson
- Tony Bennett
- James Caan
- David Steinberg
- George Lucas
- Ruth Westheimer (Dr. Ruth)
- Bill Maher
- Pete Seeger

== Production ==
It was also produced by Berman, along with Peter Raymont and Victor Solnicki. Neither Hefner nor his company had any formal role in the making of the documentary, though he gave the filmmakers considerable access. The documentary filmed from 10 January 2008 to 31 August 2008 in Ontario.

== Release and reception ==
The film opened on 30 July 2010 in Los Angeles. in only four theaters for three days grossing $10,000—$2,500 per theater.

The film received mixed reviews from critics. Review aggregator Rotten Tomatoes reports that 59% of 54 critics have given the film a positive review, with a rating average of 6.4 out of 10. Metacritic, which assigns a weighted average score out of 100 to reviews from mainstream critics, gives the film a score of 55 based on 16 reviews.
