= Janieta Eyre =

Canadian photographer

- Born: 1971 (age 54–55); London, England
- Education: University of Toronto; Ontario College of Art and Design
- Known for: Photographer
- Website: janietaeyre.com

Janieta Eyre (born 1971) is a British-born photographer who lives in Kingston, Ontario, Canada.

She is most known for her works of self-portraiture, in which she presents herself as a set of twins, and engages with the possibilities of multiple identities in the construction of self. Eyre uses elaborate props and costumes to disrupt the fixity of her images.

Her work has been shown across Canada and internationally. In 1997, Eyre was awarded the Duke and Duchess of York Award for Photography, and in 2004 she was part of the Kodak Lecture Series, at Ryerson University in Toronto.

Janieta Eyre has participated in Scotiabank's CONTACT Photography Festival numerous times and "Constructing Mythologies" was a featured exhibition of the 2013 festival.

Her works were the inspiration for Canadian singer-songwriter JF Robitaille's 2013 music video for "Black and White" from the album Rival Hearts.

== Background info ==
Eyre was born in London, England. She received a B.A. in philosophy from the University of Toronto in 1988 and studied Magazine Journalism at Ryerson Polytechnic University before starting part-time studies in photography at the Ontario College of Art and Design. In 1995, she took up photography professionally, at the age of 27.

Her visual practice began in high school when Eyre, from a combination of depression and shyness, stopped speaking. She learned that by being silent, you become invisible. She gradually recovered her speech, but never lost her feeling for being an unseen observer.

She began her creative career as a writer and claims that if she had remained in Britain, she would have continued as a poet or a novelist. In a North American culture dominated by film and television, she could make a greater impact with images.

== Photographic work ==
Eyre's photographs converge on performance, photography, and digital media. Her works have been compared to the experiments of early feminist photographers such as Claude Cahun, Madame Yevonde, Cindy Sherman and Francesca Woodman, as well as the contemporary artists Mariko Mori and Matthew Barney.

Eyre photographs in a faux-documentary style that is reminiscent of the earliest photographic artists from the middle years of the 19th century due to a fascination with spirit photography. She sets up meticulously detailed scenes, painting and furnishing rooms in her apartment. Her works are elaborately staged, composed, and cryptic. She does not try to pass off her staged as reality in the way 19th-century photographers did. She deliberately reveals the artificiality of her subjects through a collage of costumes and objects in which all symbols become abstraction in intentionally provocative and pointedly surreal works. Eyre's photographs, full of private charms, magical emblems and eccentric rituals, also recall early symbolism, from crosses to alchemy to numerology. Her photographs are strong on narrative content and rich in atmosphere and are an examination of how looking constructs identity. Vividly bright colours and flattened, painterly patterned spaces provide the backdrop in familiar, childlike, colourful environments to draw us into her fantastic world where the private is unveiled.

Eyre transforms herself into a variety of characters and uses double-exposure photography to create a surreal twin for herself. She is best known for her doubles or doppelgangers which were initially made by masking off her camera lens and double-exposing the negative and later employed digital manipulation to the same effect. In doing so Eyre disguises her own visage as well as her narratives. Though claiming to only use herself as a model out of convenience, her self-portraits are widely self-examining and probe questions of identity. Janieta Eyre's photographic self-as-monster portraits of Siamese twins, amputations and sideshow "pinheads" are very much about public persona and social acceptance. The practice of twinning fostered the myth that the second entity is actually her dead sister. The myth is not confirmed to be entirely true nor untrue. Allegedly during the delivery, shortly after Janieta was born, there was an afterbirth that passed from her mother's womb that Eyre has always felt to be a dead twin. The artist has also claimed that she was a Siamese twin at birth, with her sister dying during a 43-hour surgery that separated them. Eyre draws inspiration from the idea of having past lives; in having "two images of myself." She says the twin in art shows us that the self as we imagine it is not a separate, unique entity but that we only really exists in relationship to others.

Eyre draws inspiration from what is unseen, and images from her dreams. She describes her work as involving the accumulation of impossible memories in an increasingly deliberate and meticulous documenting of an unreality. While discarding her everyday life, she instead documents an invisible one and constructs an autobiography that depends less on truth than possibility. In exploring these issues of self-identity, Eyre takes a wholly intuitive approach to art-making and thinks of her photographs as automatisms. She thinks of her art as a healing process that can be used as we become increasingly alienated from our bodies and selves through advanced technology. She hopes that through her personal art she can become more connected. Janieta is more interested in exploring inner lives and thinks of her photographic practice as a sort of meditation.

== Exhibitions ==
=== Incarnations ===
Eyre's first solo exhibition originally shown at the Garnet Press Gallery, Toronto in 1995. It was inspired by the paintings of Balthus and Neil Gaiman's novel, Coraline. Her series of photographs have all been about "constructing an autobiography that is based on possibility, rather than reality." Her imaginary identities propose a self that's fluid, not fixed. They are Eyre's answer to a favourite Buddhist koan: "Who were you and what did you look like before your parents were born?" which was the inspirations for the photograph The Day I Gave Birth to My Mother.

=== Lady Lazarus ===
Originally shown in 1999 at the Cristinerose Gallery, New York, New York, followed by exhibitions at Diane Farris Gallery, Vancouver, British Columbia, and Francesco Girondini Arte Contemporanea, Verona, Italy in 2000. The title comes from Sylvia Plath's "Lady Lazarus" and was inspired by the quote, "Dying/Is an art, like everything else." It examines her fascination with death, especially her own. In a series of around 30 stylized photographs, rich with allusions to Mannerist painting, she documented possible scenarios of her own demise. In the series Eyre's poses are rehearsals for possible ends that she absorbs into her own body. The resonant photos depict the photographer in staged death poses: in a bathtub, knife on the bathroom tiles; head leaning on an open oven door; covered in a filmy shroud. The subjects are eviscerated, yet also confrontational and erotic.

=== Motherhood and Natural History Museum ===
Opened in 2002 at the Christopher Cutts Gallery, Toronto, Ontario, and the Cristinerose Gallery, New York, New York. The series documents the long, winding and rocky road of pregnancy, giving birth and postpartum depression and takes an unconventional look at motherhood. It was shown as a series of large-format photographs accompanied by a nine-minute video installation presented via split screen video projection in which the artist, visibly pregnant, performs symbolic rituals linked to childbirth. While pregnant, Eyre was seriously stricken with morning sickness. Some images in the series present the experience as a horror show of blood, alienation and the spectre of death. The gutting of a bird may give you some understanding of how Eyre felt about her own experience giving birth, and her depictions of motherhood are anything but joyful. In one image, My Little Piglet, Eyre stands with rows of breasts exposed like the teats of a sow, near a pram with a piglet in a bonnet, and the artist is presented as being milked dry. In another diptych, depicting genetics gone mad, and sarcastically titled Motherhood, two heads sprout gratuitously from one body with their baby, the severed head of a sheep they hold in their arms. These images bring to mind a societal attitude towards animals that is abysmal. "People are often appalled by it," she says, referring to the series as a whole – or rather, to its presentation of some of the darker emotions that may attend pregnancy. This was Eyre's way of confronting all sides of a physical and spiritual metamorphosis that she wanted to explore; sex and death are prevalent subjects in art, but motherhood is not.

=== In The Scream Of Things ===
Unlike some of her artist friends, Eyre had no interest in getting her child involved in her work. She feared that if she did, the child might grow up to resent her. However, when her daughter turned 7, she wanted to know why she wasn't in any of her photographs. The result was a series of photos that were exhibited in 2008 at Art Mur, Montreal as well as the Begona Malone Gallery, in Madrid. The images depict a young girl with bruised or covered eyes placed on furniture surrounded by butterflies and birds.

=== The Mute Book ===
In 2012 Eyre created The Mute Book, which was originally shown at Galerie Samuel Lallouz, Montreal. The inspiration came from a place most of us can recognize: winter, feeling depressed, and not wanting to get out of pyjamas. She related the feeling to an old circus photo of a performer costumed half as man, half as woman. Eyre thought it would be interesting to do a series of halves, with half as presentable and polite and the other half that isn't functioning, and is fed up and melancholy and sewed together costumes of wildly different colours and patterns. The title for the series came from Liber Mutus (Mute Book), a 17th-century pictorial alchemist's manual for the transformation of matter and the self.

=== I Should Have Begun With This ===
In 2013, Eyre published a series of photographs that explore the promise of girls to society. In black and white, mixed-media portraits, the subject matter consists of girls and shifting landscape, capturing moments of transition. The photographs aim to touch on the potential of girls just before adulthood, and the sense of hope and/or possibility that they contain.

== Film work ==
Eyre's first film, the 13-minute short Now We Understand Each Other, is based on part of a short story that Eyre wrote at seventeen about an older woman who believes that two dolls are her children, as well as a play she wrote in her thirties about family violence. The main character, played by Kate Trotter, converses with twin dolls she believes are her daughters, recounting past loves and infidelities. Hans Bellmer's grotesque dolls were the biggest influence on Eyre's story. She commissioned artist Jason McClennen to make dolls that looked as realistic as possible, based on the likeness of her own daughter. The film speaks to accidents and contingencies of the past that define the person that one becomes, in leaving traces of other, possible, unrealized lives. The darker aspects of motherhood are further explored in the film, notably the idea of a mother bearing children she doesn't like.

== Film performances ==
Letters from Home, directed by Mike Hoolboom, premiered in the Toronto International Film Festival, 1996

== Selected public collections ==
- Musée d'art contemporain de Montréal, Montreal
- Art Gallery of Ontario, Toronto
- National Gallery of Art, Reykjavik, Iceland
- Ciudad de Cultura, Fundacion Municipal, Salamanca, Spain
- "Janieta Eyre". www.gallery.ca. National Gallery of Canada.
- Bailey & Company, Inc., Toronto
- Shadow Play, Toronto
- Microsoft, Seattle, Washington
- Seymour Collection, Vancouver, British Columbia
- Art Gallery of Guelph, Guelph, Ontario
- Margulies Collection, Miami, Florida
- Hart House, University of Toronto
- Canada Council Art Bank, Ottawa
- "Collection". rmg.minisisinc.com. Robert McLaughlin Gallery, Oshawa. Archived from the original on 6 November 2022.

== Bibliography ==
- Incarnations The Photography of Janieta Eyre. Coach House Books. 2017. ISBN 978-1-55245-357-5. OCLC 974677260.
