= The Circle Game (film) =

- Directed by: Brigitte Berman
- Written by: Brigitte Berman; Marie-Lynn Hammond
- Produced by: Brigitte Berman; Joan Cohl
- Starring: Marnie McPhail; Janet-Laine Green; Albert Schultz; Tom McCamus
- Cinematography: Mitchell Ness
- Edited by: Bruce Lange
- Music by: Gordie Johnson
- Production company: Shadowlife Film
- Release date: September 8, 1994 (TIFF)
- Running time: 112 minutes
- Country: Canada
- Language: English

The Circle Game is a Canadian musical drama film, directed by Brigitte Berman and released in 1994.

== Plot ==
Monika (Marnie McPhail) is a blues pianist and singer. She challenges her mother Anna (Janet-Laine Green) over custody of their 12-year-old family member Andrea (Renessa Blitz) after Anna proves herself to be an inattentive and irresponsible guardian.

== Cast ==
- Marnie McPhail as Monika
- Janet-Laine Green as Anna
- Renessa Blitz as Andrea
- Albert Schultz
- Tom McCamus
- Brooke Johnson
- Jayne Eastwood
- David Fox
- Joseph Ziegler
- Christopher Bondy
- Anna Henry
- Emma Speakman
- Dawn Greenhalgh

Canadian blues-rock band Big Sugar appears in the film as Monika's band, and Kate Fenner of Bourbon Tabernacle Choir provides Monika's singing voice.

== Production ==
It was the first narrative feature film directed by Berman, previously best known for her Academy Award-winning documentary film Artie Shaw: Time Is All You've Got.

By early 1993, Berman was still struggling with the script and despairing of whether she would be able to get the film into production at all, but stated that her spirits were buoyed when she was invited to a special gathering of every living woman who had ever won an Academy Award, during which she had encouraging conversations with actresses Geena Davis and Ginger Rogers.

The film was shot in fall 1993 in Toronto. Production locations included the real-life home of producer Joan Cohl, with band performance scenes shot in various Queen Street West nightclubs.

== Distribution ==
The film premiered in the Perspectives Canada program at the 1994 Toronto International Film Festival, before going into limited commercial release in November.

The film's central narrative twist, that Monika rather than Anna was Andrea's actual birth mother, was subject to a request by Berman and the producers that media "not reveal the secret or the plot line in order to allow public viewers the opportunity to experience the film for themselves," even though Berman herself had previously stated that the film was about a young single mother named Monika in its early production coverage.

== Critical response ==
Christopher Harris of The Globe and Mail criticized the embargo on the plot description without violating it, writing that "perhaps I dozed off and missed a critical moment, but I can't recall anything that resembles, say, the thunderclap of The Crying Game's sudden twist — another recent movie that came with a plea for secrecy. The Circle Game does have unforeseen turns, of course, but they come with no buildup and virtually no narrative tension. The 'secret' in question (if it's the one I'm thinking of) is neither especially surprising nor particularly unusual for a drama about family dysfunction and inter-generational conflict." He further noted that the film's strongest moments came in the musical performances and the brief scenes featuring Eastwood, and concluded that "Berman and her colleagues certainly have the best of intentions. There's nothing exploitative about The Circle Game; it deals sensitively with its subject. In its muffled way, it is a cry for openness in family relations, a call for honesty, a plea for respecting our children, our parents, ourselves. It's a shame the message is contained in such a contrived and unconvincing package."

Todd McCarthy of Variety wrote that "part of the problem is Berman’s lack of any restraining hand on the performers, who are uniformly way over the top. Other major flaws are her impulse to spell everything out in capital letters and the hand-held cinema verite style that flattens everything rather than lending it dramatic punch."

For the Toronto Star, Craig MacInnis wrote that "Berman understands the dynamics of popular music better than most, and she has a fine eye for the rough surface textures of life in the clubs — the barbed banter, the studied ennui, the sex. But these are the inventory-taking skills of a documentarian. A feature-length fiction film like The Circle Game — and this is Berman's first — needs more than a few cool tunes and some realistic settings to push it over the top. It needs a credible storyline, which The Circle Game lacks in spades." He ultimately concluded that the film would have been much better if Berman had dropped the narrative plot and simply made a Big Sugar documentary or concert film.
