= Fred Kelemen =

Hungarian-German film director and cinematographer

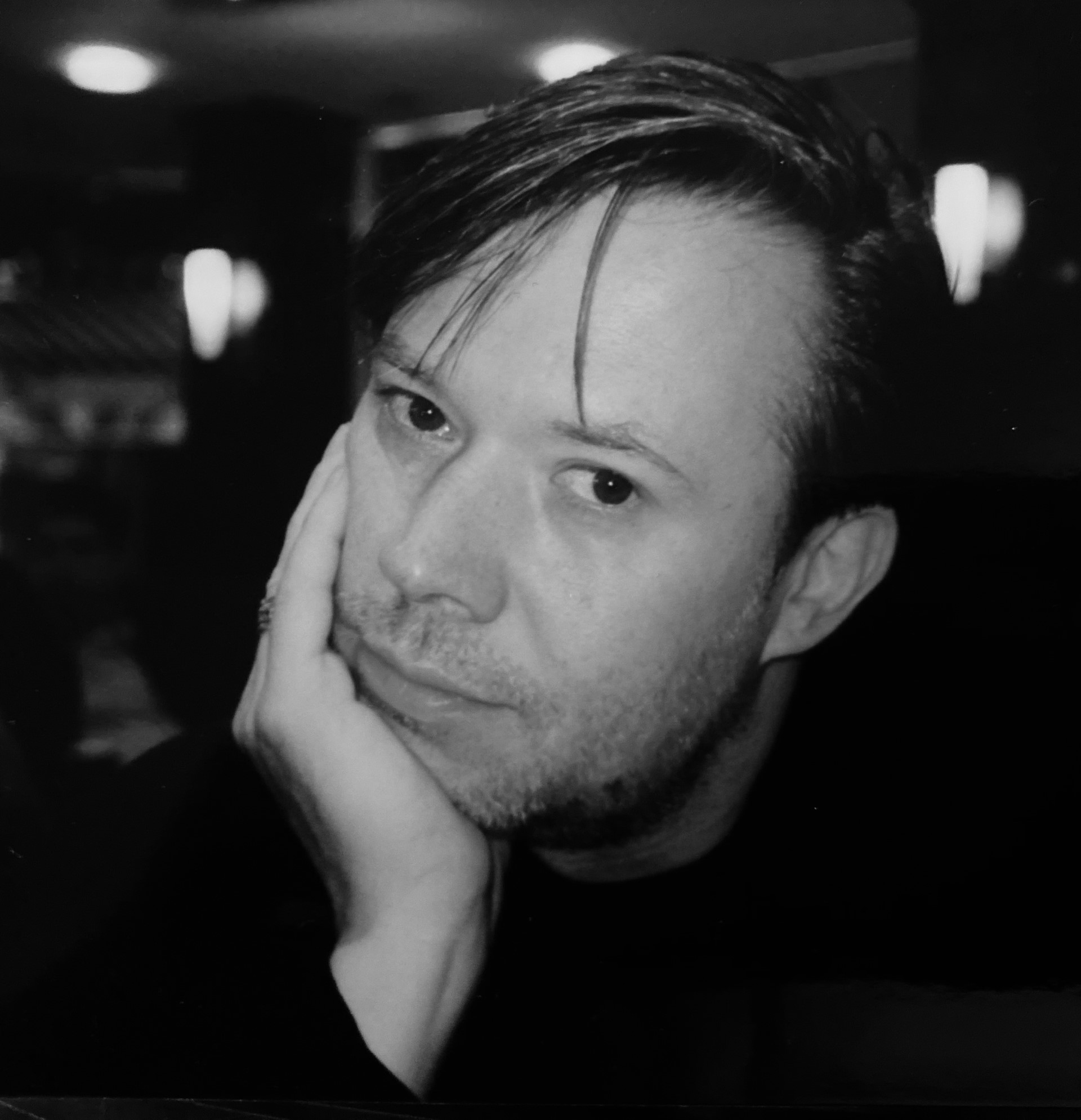
Fred Kelemen

Fred Kelemen (born on 6 January 1964) is a European film and theater director, cinematographer and writer.

The late Susan Sontag helped to promote Kelemen's work in the mid-1990s, comparing it to the likes of Alexander Sokurov, Béla Tarr and Sharunas Bartas.

Fred Kelemen studied painting, music, philosophy, science of religions and theater before attending the German Film & TV Academy in Berlin from 1989 to 1994. His debut film Fate in 1994 received the German National Film Award. He has also directed Frost (1997/98), Nightfall (1999) and Fallen (2005), each drawing international attention and numerous awards.

Kelemen has served as cinematographer for film directors including Béla Tarr (Journey to the Plain, 1995, The Man from London, 2007, The Turin Horse, 2011), Rudolf Thome (The Visible and the Invisible, 2007), Gariné Torossian (Stone, Time, Touch, 2005), Joseph Pitchhadze (Sukaryot /Sweets], 2012/2013), Pavel Lungin (Esau, 2018) and others.

Since 2000 he has also directed several plays, including an adaptation of Ray Bradbury’s Fahrenheit 451 at the Schauspielhaus in Hanover, and Eugene O'Neill's Desire Under The Elms at Volksbühne in Berlin. In addition, he has worked as a teacher at film and media institutes and universities at several locations.

With his production company Kino Kombat Filmmanufactur, Kelemen produced his film Krisana/Fallen (co-producer: Laima Freimane/Screen Vision, Latvia, 2005) and he produced or co-produced the films Moskatchka by Annett Schütze (co-producer: Laima Freimane/Screen Vision, Latvia, 2005), "Girlfriends" by Jana Marsik (co-producers: Laima Freimane/Screen Vision, Latvia, jana Marsik) and Fragment by Gyula Maár (producer: Béla Tarr/TTFilmműhely, Hungary, 2007).

== Filmography ==
Director

- 1993 – Kalyi
- 1994 – Fate (Verhängnis)
- 1997/1998 – Frost
- 1999 – Nightfall
- 2005 – Krisana
- 2016 – Sarajevo Songs Of Woe

Cinematographer

- 1993 – Kalyi
- 1994 – Fate (Verhängnis)
- 1995 – Utazás az Alföldön (short)
- 1997/1998 – Frost
- 1999 – Nightfall
- 2000 – Tatau Samoa (documentary)
- 2007 – Stone Time Touch (documentary)
- 2007 – The Man from London
- 2007 – The Visible and the Invisible
- 2011 – The Turin Horse
- 2013 – Sukaryot
- 2016 – Blue Psalm for Wolves / Sarajevo Songs of Woe
- 2018 - Esau
- 2019 Missing People
- 2021 / 2022 (2025) Into the Heart

== Awards ==
- 1994 – FIPRESCI-Award for "Fate" (original title: "Verhängnis")'
- 1995 – German National Film Award (Silver Ribbon) for "Fate" (original title: "Verhängnis")
- 1998 – FIPRESCI- Award for "Frost"
- 1999 – FIPRESCI- Award for "Nightfall" (original title: "Abendland")
- 2005 – FIPRESCI- Award for "Fallen" (original title: "Kisana")
- 2005 – Latvian National Film Award "Best Cinematographer" for "Fallen" (original title: "Krisana")
- 2005 – German Camera Award - Nomination
- 2011 – Golden Camera 300 - International Cinematographers' Film Festival Manaki Brothers / Macedonia for "The Turin Horse"
- 2011 – Carlo Di Palma Best European Cinematographer Award - Nomination
- 2012 – Hungarian National Film Award - Best Cinematographer
- 2013 – Innovation Award of the German Film Critics' Association
- 2016 – Special Prize MASTER, Yerevan International Film Festival "Golden Apricot"
- 2016 – St. Grigor Narekatsi Gold Medal of the Ministry of Culture of Armenia, Yerevan/Armenia
