= Fate (1994 film) =

1994 German drama film

- German: Verhängnis
- Directed by: Fred Kelemen
- Written by: Fred Kelemen
- Produced by: Christian Hohoff
- Starring: Valerij Federenko; Sanja Spengler
- Cinematography: Fred Kelemen
- Edited by: Fred Kelemen
- Production company: Deutsche Film- und Fernsehakademie Berlin
- Distributed by: Argus Films; Edition Salzgeber
- Release date: September 10, 1994 (TIFF)
- Running time: 89 minutes
- Country: Germany
- Languages: Russian; German; Spanish

Fate (German: Verhängnis) is a German drama film, directed by Fred Kelemen and released in 1994. Taking place in a single night, the film unfolds as a series of vignettes illustrating various characters whose paths intersect and cross in an unnamed German city, highlighting their isolation and disconnection from each other as its relatively limited dialogue is spoken in multiple languages.

The film begins with an epigram of a quote from the Dalai Lama, stating that "the distance between our present life and an existence in hell can be as short as a single breath".

The cast includes Valerij Fedorenko, Sanja Spengler, Marc Ottiker and Eddi Zacharias

The film was shot on Hi8 video before being transferred to 35mm film, to give it a murky, washed-out look.

The film premiered at the 1994 Toronto International Film Festival, where it received an honorable mention from the FIPRESCI Prize jury.
