= TIFF Cinematheque =

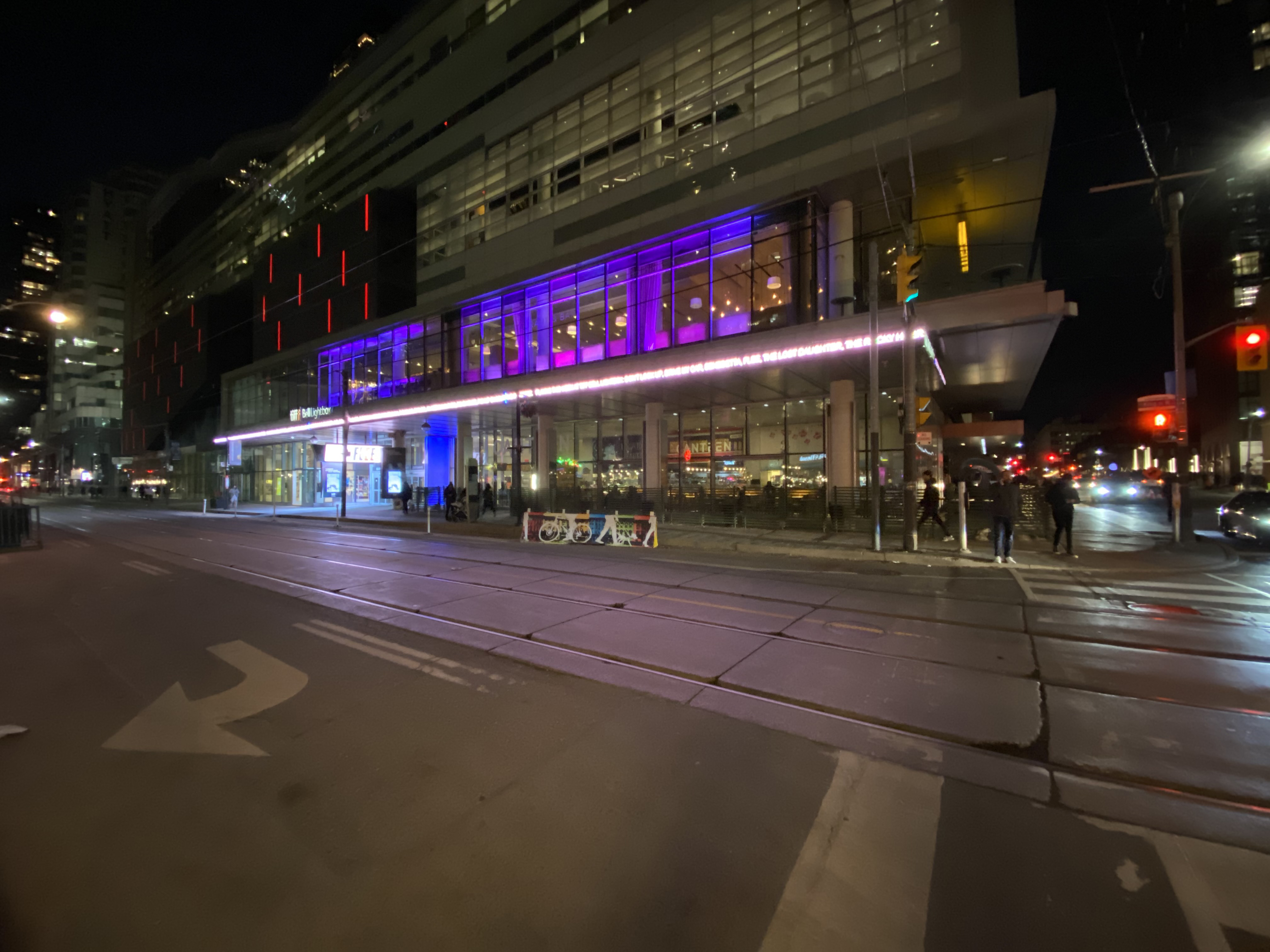
- TIFF Cinematheque is shown at the Bell Lightbox
- Location: Toronto, Ontario, Canada
- Founded: 1990
- Website: http://www.tiff.net/cinematheque

TIFF Cinematheque (formerly Cinematheque Ontario) is a year-round programme of the Toronto International Film Festival devoted to the presentation, understanding and appreciation of Canadian and international cinema through carefully curated programming. It features acclaimed director's retrospectives, national and regional spotlights, experimental and avant-garde cinema, exclusive engagements of classic films, including many new and rare archival prints. It was established in 1990 after TIFF assumed management of the Ontario Film Institute from Gerald Pratley, creating Cinematheque for the OFI's film screening program while moving the OFI's reference library to the new Film Reference Library.

When TIFF took over the program, its leadership was assumed by James Quandt, who remained head of the program for 31 years until retiring in 2021.

The Cinematheque screenings were originally shown in Jackman Hall at the Art Gallery of Ontario, before moving to the Bell Lightbox in the fall of 2010.
