= Gerald Pratley =

Canadian film critic and historian (1923–2011)

Gerald Arthur Pratley (September 3, 1923 – March 14, 2011) was a Canadian film critic and historian. A longtime film critic for the Canadian Broadcasting Corporation, he was historically most noted as founder and director of the Ontario Film Institute, a film archive and reference library which was acquired by the Toronto International Film Festival in 1990 and became the contemporary Film Reference Library and TIFF Cinematheque.

Born in London, England, Pratley emigrated to Canada in 1946 and joined the CBC two years later. For the CBC he hosted various radio shows about cinema, including The Movie Scene, Music from the Films and Pratley at the Movies, between 1948 and 1975. He was a writer for various publications including Variety, Canadian Film Weekly, Canadian Film Digest, Hollywood Digest and Films in Review.

He established the Ontario Film Institute in 1968, served as director of the Stratford Film Festival from 1969 to 1975, and was a jury chair for the Canadian Film Awards between 1969 and 1976. He was also the author of several books about Canadian film, including Torn Sprockets: The Uncertain Projection of the Canadian Film and A Century of Canadian Cinema: Gerald Pratley's Feature Film Guide, as well as studies of the work of John Frankenheimer, Otto Preminger, David Lean and John Huston. After the Ontario Film Institute was acquired by TIFF, leadership of the program was taken over by James Quandt, and Pratley then taught film history courses at Ryerson University for a number of years.

He was appointed a Member of the Order of Canada in 1984, and was promoted to Officer in 2003. At the 22nd Genie Awards in 2002, he was also the recipient of a special lifetime achievement award to honour his work as a promoter of Canadian film, and in 1998 he was the recipient of the Toronto Film Critics Association's Clyde Gilmour Award for distinguished contributions to Canadian film criticism.

He died on March 14, 2011, in Belleville, Ontario.
