= Brigitte Berman =

Canadian documentary filmmaker

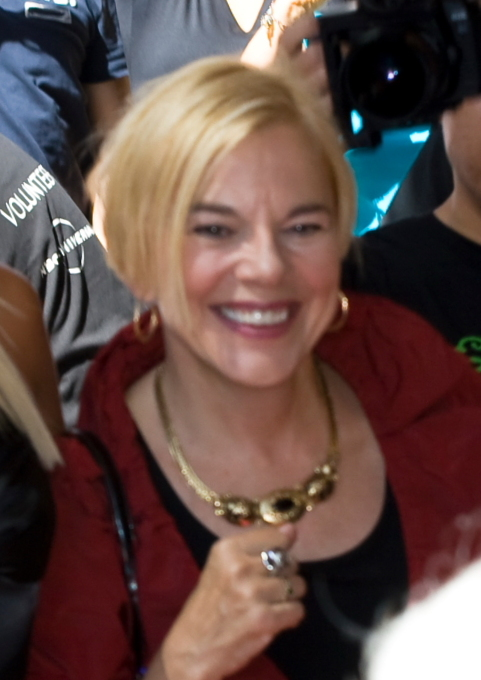
- Berman in 2009
- Born: 1951 (age 74–75); West Germany
- Education: Queen's University, Kingston
- Occupation: Documentary filmmaker
- Notable work: Artie Shaw: Time Is All You've Got (1985)

Brigitte Berman (born 1951) is a Canadian documentary filmmaker, most noted for her 1985 film Artie Shaw: Time Is All You've Got.

== Early life and work ==
Originally from West Germany, she moved to Canada with her family in childhood and studied film at Queen's University.

She joined the Canadian Broadcasting Corporation as a researcher in the early 1970s, later becoming a creator of television documentaries for the network's documentary series Take 30.

== Film career ==
Her first theatrical documentary film, Bix: Ain't None of Them Play Like Him Yet, was a profile of jazz musician Bix Beiderbecke and was released in 1982.

Artie Shaw: Time Is All You've Got was released in 1985. The film, which profiled American clarinetist and bandleader Artie Shaw, was a Genie Award nominee for Best Feature Length Documentary at the 7th Genie Awards in 1986, and a co-winner with Down and Out in America of the Academy Award for Best Documentary Feature Film at the 59th Academy Awards in 1987.

She subsequently enrolled at the Canadian Film Centre as part of its inaugural class in 1987.

In 1994, her narrative feature debut, The Circle Game, premiered at the 1994 Toronto International Film Festival.

In the mid-1990s, Shaw sued Berman on the grounds that as Time Is All You've Got had become more critically and commercially successful than had been expected, he was entitled to receive a greater share of the film's profits than he had originally agreed to in the 1980s. His lawsuit was dismissed in Ontario Superior Court in 1997.

She subsequently directed a number of television films before returning to documentary filmmaking in the late 2000s with Hugh Hefner: Playboy, Activist and Rebel (2009). She also later released the Gordon Pinsent documentary The River of My Dreams in 2016, and Hugh Hefner's After Dark: Speaking Out in America in 2018.

== Restorations ==
A restored print of Ain't None of Them Play Like Him Yet was screened at various film festivals in 2021.

A new print of Time Is All You've Got screened in the TIFF Classics program at the 2023 Toronto International Film Festival in advance of being permanently archived in the collection of the Film Reference Library.
