= Faith, Fraud, & Minimum Wage =

Faith, Fraud & Minimum Wage
- Promotional poster for the film
- Directed by: George Mihalka
- Written by: Josh MacDonald
- Produced by: Bev Bliss; Colin Neale
- Starring: Callum Keith Rennie; Martha MacIsaac; Ricky Mabe; Andrew Bush
- Cinematography: Norayr Kasper
- Edited by: Gaétan Huot
- Release date: November 1, 2011
- Running time: 98 mins
- Countries: Canada, US
- Languages: English (also available in German and Hungarian)
- Box office: undisclosed

Faith, Fraud & Minimum Wage is a 2011 comedy film adaption of Canadian playwright Josh MacDonald's play Halo. The film is directed by George Mihalka, and stars Callum Keith Rennie and Martha MacIsaac.

== Plot ==
Rebellious Casey McMullen wrestles with the true nature of miracles when her father begins to believe in a religious hoax which she has secretly created. Casey never knew what a miracle could do, until she created one. Frustrated with her life, Casey throws a cup of coffee at the wall of Krowne Donuts where she works, and the splash seems to closely resemble an image of Jesus Christ. Overnight, Casey finds herself becoming the ring-leader of a growing faith circus. Casey's father, haunted by the aftermath of a family tragedy, is letting everything around him fall apart: his mortgage payments, his business, everything. Casey's hoax might just be the revelation her Dad needs, but the result of Casey's hoax are not at all what she expected.

== Cast ==
- Callum Keith Rennie as Donald
- Martha MacIsaac as Casey
- Ricky Mabe as Jansen
- Andrew Bush as Father JJ
- Don Allison as uncle Bob
- Claudia Besso as lead reporter
- Cory Bowles as Charles
- Richard Dumont as local DJ
- Matthew Amyotte as Stu
- Cameron Davidson as Harold
- Francine Deschepper as Mim Masters
- Tara Doyle as Liz
- Sarah English as Tayna Parr
- Brian Heighton as Brad
- Martha Irving as Pearl

== Awards ==
Nominee for the 2011 DGC craft award for outstanding Achievement in Direction - George Mihalka

Only Nova Scotian film chosen to premiere at the 2011 Shanghai Film Festival
