= Frank's Cock =

1993 short film by Mike Hoolboom

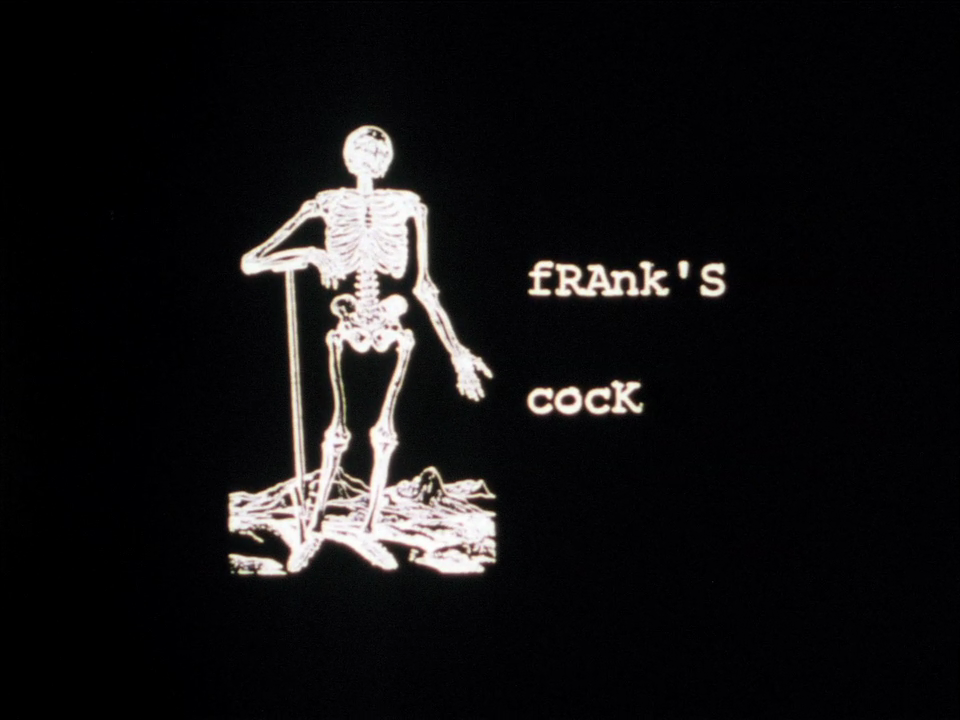
- Directed by: Mike Hoolboom
- Written by: Mike Hoolboom
- Produced by: Alex Mackenzie
- Starring: Callum Keith Rennie
- Narrated by: Callum Keith Rennie
- Edited by: Mike Hoolboom
- Release date: 1993 (Canada)
- Running time: 8 minutes
- Country: Canada
- Language: English

Frank's Cock is a 1993 Canadian short film written and directed by Mike Hoolboom. The eight-minute production stars Callum Keith Rennie as an unnamed narrator who discusses his relationship with his partner, Frank. The two met while the narrator was a teenager and spent nearly ten years together. Frank has since been diagnosed with AIDS, and the narrator fears his death. The story was based on the experience of one of Hoolboom's friends at People With AIDS, which Hoolboom adapted after receiving a commission to create a short film about breaking up.

Shot on a low budget, the work is shown in a split-screen format with interspersed scenes from popular culture, gay pornography, and human embryo formation; this format is meant to symbolise the "fragmentation of the body" experienced by AIDS sufferers. Produced by Alex Mackenzie, Frank's Cock was critically acclaimed and won several awards, including the NFB–John Spotton Award for best Canadian short film at the 1994 Toronto International Film Festival. The script has been republished several times and has inspired a short on LGBTQ issues in Canada's native community.

== Synopsis ==
An unnamed narrator (Callum Keith Rennie), who as a teenager intended to be the "Michael Jordan of sex" or "Wayne Gretzky with a hard-on", discusses how he met and fell in love with an older man named Frank. After the two met at a group sex session, they began an older brother–younger brother fantasy and moved in together. Frank has a voracious sexual appetite and, at times, invites the narrator for whole-day sex sessions. He is a tender lover, teaching his partner how to fly a box kite and cooking omelettes for him. The narrator is pleased with Frank's attentions and their sexual experimentation, although he is initially confused by Frank's insistence on listening to Peter Gzowski's Morningside during sex. As their ten-year anniversary approaches, Frank – having lost much weight and developed Kaposi's sarcomas – has been diagnosed with AIDS, leaving the narrator stunned; he concludes the narration with "I'm going to miss him. He was the best friend I ever had."

== Production ==
The Canadian director Mike Hoolboom was diagnosed with HIV in 1988 or 1989, after going to donate blood. In a 1993 interview, he stated that he felt himself working harder after the diagnosis, finishing films at a more rapid rate because he was uncertain how long he would live. Hoolboom also became "fascinated with a body of parts spliced and spliced again", experimenting with "interruptive rhythms" as a way to reexamine simple acts. Having previously focused on films about the body, Hoolboom began dealing heavily with fragmentation, HIV/AIDS, and situations faced by those with the virus; Frank's Cock was his first venture directly addressing the AIDS issue.

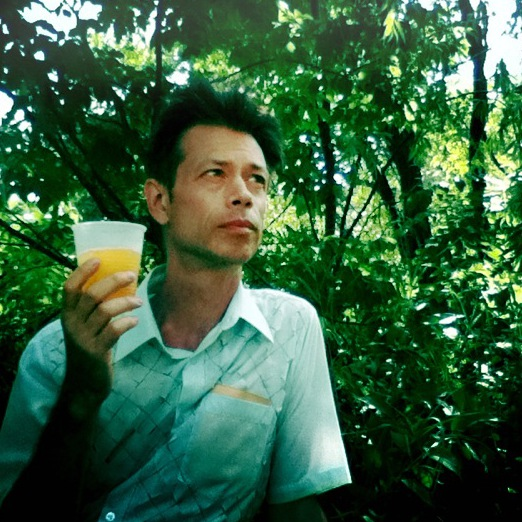
Mike Hoolboom, creator of Frank's Cock

While living in Vancouver, Hoolboom joined the local People With AIDS (PWA) group. There he befriended a man (Joey in some sources, Alan in others) whose partner was dying of AIDS. Upon his friend's suggestion, Hoolboom began work on a script for "a real movie": one which portrayed an AIDS patient as full of love, not one that showed the patient's friends abandoning him. The friend was, however, unwilling to appear in the film. In writing the script Hoolboom tried to keep elements of humour; he later said that the humour was necessary as the source had insisted "most of our relationship was incredibly joyous and happy and a good time".

After receiving a commission to make a short film for the Vancouver-based cooperative Cineworks, Hoolboom began working on realising the script with a low budget and limited amount of 16 mm film from the National Film Board of Canada; he was one of seven artists commissioned to "spark local production" with short films on breakup, which were ultimately included in the omnibus Breaking Up. Rennie – at that time a relative unknown – agreed to deliver the monologue. Hoolboom was pleased with the results, writing that Rennie presented the monologue as if "he'd been living this story all along." The majority of the technical work, including direction, cinematography, and editing, was handled by Hoolboom; Alex Mackenzie, working for Cineworks, produced the film.

Part of the terms of his grant were that Hoolboom was allowed a limited number of edits (one or three). After pondering how to complete the film under such terms, Hoolboom chose to use no edits. He recorded previously edited footage, some appropriated from various sources, through a hole in a piece of cardboard, producing a single quadrant; he repeated this process three times, using the same film, which resulted in four quadrants with four different images. Production was completed by early 1993, and in screenings Frank's Cock was marketed as an "extremely explicit" experimental film.

Although societal awareness of AIDS had developed at a slower pace in Canada than in the United States, films regarding the disease had appeared nearly concurrently: both the first Canadian documentary and the first American feature-length film on the subject, Nik Sheehan's No Sad Songs and John Erman's An Early Frost respectively, were released in 1985. However, the majority of the early gay artists with AIDS had died by the time Hoolboom made Frank's Cock; as such, the film scholar Thomas Waugh considers Hoolboom a second-generation figurehead in AIDS activism and one of the earliest not coming from the gay community.

== Style ==
A scene from the film, depicting the use of each quadrant; the split screen effect has been described as evoking the physical effects of AIDS.

Frank's Cock divides the screen into quadrants, with the majority of the film focusing on the upper-right corner of the screen. In this panel, Rennie's character gives a monologue, which is sometimes illustrated by images in other panels: the lower-right panel flashes scenes of hardcore gay pornography, the upper-left shows scenes representing human embryo formation, while the lower-left flashes excerpts from popular art. Aside from the original footage of Rennie, the short appropriated clips from the Nova episode The Miracle of Life, the gay pornographic film The Best of Blondes, and the music video for Madonna's 1992 song "Erotica". The effect was later reused in Hoolboom's 1997 short Positiv.

Janis Cole, writing for Point of View, described the split-screen effect as supporting the text while "creating an optical treatment purposefully grounded in both dream and reality", as elements show out of sync. Jeff Rush and Cynthia Baughman, writing in the Journal of Film and Video, described the film as showing that "text can reverse the traditional balance of words = abstractions/images = the concrete" through the creation of vivid, perhaps disturbing, word pictures which serve as tangible images contrasted with the faint abstractions which are the actual images. Jack Rusholme, prefacing a retrospective of Hoolboom's works by Experimenta Media Arts, wrote that the split-screen evokes the effects of AIDS, in which "the body [is] broken into dispersed vantages", while the narration serves to "bind with words what this disease will render lifeless and inert". In a 1994 interview, Hoolboom stated that his intent was to represent the "fragmentation of the body" experienced by AIDS sufferers.

== Reception ==
Frank's Cock has received warm critical reviews, both in Canada and abroad. Cole called it an "extraordinary experimental documentary" that is "as bold as the title implies" and a strong argument for the widespread dissemination of short films. Waugh placed Frank's Cock as one of a "great AIDS triptych", together with Hoolboom's later works Letters from Home (1996) and Positiv. The Canadian film scholar Darell Varga wrote that the film is an "emotionally riveting" eulogy to the loss of love. Karen Tisch, writing in Take One, found that the short built its emotional power "delicately but steadily"; she suggested that its Toronto International Film Festival (TIFF) win was well-deserved.

Reviewing for the Western Australian independent film magazine In the Picture, James Twentyman wrote that the film was "relatively straightforward" but strong and provocative, emphasising the "soul-baring" nature of the monologue. Rush and Baughman found that the short took the narrative voice beyond what is mainstream, demonstrating "the power of word and image", while Rusholme described Frank's Cock as Hoolboom's "most explicit AIDS narrative". The Swiss film festival Viper touted the short as expressing humour and sexual obsession in the face of a plague.

Hoolboom has stated that he felt the film was accessible to both gay or straight audiences, which should "open them up to differences of form and why [one] would make something formally different." Waugh suggested that this was successful, as in his experience audiences often cried at screenings.

== Legacy ==
Frank's Cock won several awards at domestic and international film festivals. At the 1994 TIFF it won the NFB–John Spotton Award, given for the best Canadian short film. The jury cited Frank's Cock for its "evocative images, ... impeccable writing and mise-en-scène, ... moving depiction of the universal human experiences of love and loss in the age of AIDS, and especially for its success in shaking our preconceptions". The selection included C$2,500 in prize money and a further C$2,500 worth of film processing. When accepting the award, Hoolboom quipped "Frank's Cock has never seemed so large"; Waugh, however, suggests that the title "caused more embarrassment than mirth" when it was read during the citation. Special citations were also read for Andrew Munger's Make Some Noise and Philip Hoffman's Technilogic Ordering.

That year the film won a Golden Leopard at the Locarno International Film Festival in Locarno, Switzerland. At the Ann Arbor Film Festival in Ann Arbor, Michigan, Frank's Cock won Best Dramatic Film. The Canadian Filmmakers' Distribution Centre, which has distribution rights for the film, notes further awards at the Interfilm Festival in Berlin and Second Prize Experimental at the Big Muddy Film Festival in Carbondale, Illinois (both 1995), while Hoolboom records Frank's Cock as receiving an honourable mention at the University of Oregon's Queer Film Fest (1994).

The script for Frank's Cock has been published several times, including in the script anthology By the Skin of Their Tongues and in the Journal of Film and Video (both 1997). The film influenced Adam Garnet Jones' Secret Weapons (2008), commissioned by the Canadian Filmmakers Distribution Centre in celebration of its fortieth anniversary. However, unlike Frank's Cock, Secret Weapons focused on an LGBTQ identity within Canada's native community.

After his success at the TIFF, Hoolboom directed numerous further films, many showing a "fascination with its impermanence"; several, including Letters from Home, dealt explicitly with AIDS. Rennie, who had also received critical acclaim for his supporting role in Mina Shum's Double Happiness (1994), later became known for playing villains in Hollywood films.

== See also ==
- HIV/AIDS in Canada
- LGBT culture
- LGBT in Canada
- Misconceptions about HIV/AIDS
