= Second Best (1994 film) =

1994 drama film by Chris Menges

- Film poster
- Directed by: Chris Menges
- Written by: David Cook
- Produced by: Sarah Radclyffe
- Starring: William Hurt; John Hurt; Chris Cleary Miles
- Cinematography: Ashley Rowe
- Edited by: George Akers
- Music by: Simon Boswell
- Production companies: Regency Enterprises; Alcor Films
- Distributed by: Warner Bros.
- Release dates: September 1994 (TIFF); 30 September 1994 (United States); 18 November 1994 (United Kingdom)
- Running time: 105 minutes
- Country: United Kingdom
- Language: English
- Box office: $0.1 million (UK/US)

Second Best is a 1994 British drama film produced by Sarah Radclyffe and directed by Chris Menges. It closely follows the 1991 novel of the same name by David Cook, who also wrote the screenplay.

== Plot ==
Graham Holt is a single man, who wants to adopt a son. James Lennards is a disturbed child brought up in foster care. Graham Holt's emotional development has been smothered by his uncaring parents. James has been shifted from foster home to group home throughout his short life. Due to the nature of his past he has a hard time coping anger. He only has a vague memory of his mother from when he was aged 3, but he has a vivid and romantic image of his father, who in fact is constantly in and out of prison. Throughout the movie James has flashbacks of his past about his father and his mother which cause him to act out, from self-mutilation to destruction of property.

As Graham goes through the extended vetting process to be an adoptive parent, he has to attend classes and meet regularly with social workers. Graham and James meet and the embarrassed silences demonstrate Graham's nervousness and James's fears of the situation. When James is shown the room that would be his if the adoption goes through, he moves towards Graham and places his arms around Graham's waist, and Graham then hugs him briefly. Showing affection for the first time in his young life. James also makes friends in this time with some of the local children racing with a bicycle.

When Graham tries to explain how a relationship should work, he explains it should be a partnership, but he never mentions love. Graham has to visit key people in James's past; one of them, Lynn, a foster mother, who was one of the few females James ever got along with, was disappointed that James would not stop in to see her. She explained to Graham about James constantly running away and she finding him almost naked, hiding in holes and covered in dirt. On the ride home, Graham asks James why he liked Lynn. James answers first by scratching frenetically his legs with his hand, then by trying to jump from the car, all the while telling Graham that Lynn is not a proper woman, eventually forcing Graham to stop the car as James tries to jump out.

James convinces Graham that tenting is fun so they do it and have a happy experience. James tests Graham by finding a stick and giving himself an injury on his forehead, and requesting him to kiss the injury. He tells Graham, while remembering a similar experience with his birth father, that the kiss has to be a long one to make it feel better. Graham does it so and James shows again affection for Graham. Later that night on the camp Jamie slips into the sleeping bag with Graham.

After a few weekends together, Graham takes James to meet Graham's father's brother, Uncle Turpin. Turpin teases James and finally makes him smile. He asks Graham if he has ever apologized to his father; he always hated Graham's mother, since she would never let the father have a moment of peace. Graham objects to this saying there was love between his parents, but Turpin is adamant (in the original novel, besides, Turpin insinuates that Graham's father was in fact a closeted homosexual who had been in love with a comrade in arms during the War). Turpin also asks Graham if he is sure about wanting to adopt, and Graham insist he is.

While their relationship develops with its ups and downs, nothing shakes Graham's belief that between them, they could change each other. As a new school season is starting, Graham is allowed to foster James while the final adoption can take place so James does not have to change schools during the process.

Near the end, James's father unexpectedly shows up and, after revealing he is dying, he asks Graham to allow him to stay nearby secretly for the last few months he is expected to live, just to be able to see James without James knowing he is there. Graham disagrees: he thinks James should know all the truth. The reunion with James's father goes badly, and once again the pains of the past take over and James tries to escape the pain in the only way he knows how. Graham invites James's father to move in with them, and he and James care for him as he lives his last few months. In the end Graham says to Jamie, "I won't be second best, we must be father and son." James flips a sign over at a gas station from open to closed, more a symbol of his past is over and his new life is beginning, and he hurries to place his hand in Graham's.

== Cast ==
- William Hurt as Graham Holt
- Chris Cleary Miles as James
- John Hurt as Uncle Turpin
- Jane Horrocks as Debbie
- Alan Cumming as Bernard
- Keith Allen as John
- Jake Owen as James at age 3

== Production ==
The film was largely made in the small Welsh town of Knighton. Also in the small village of Llangunllo about 8 miles from Knighton, Wales. Some of the filming also took place on 'The Bargates' Leominster a small market town in North Herefordshire. Some of the scenes were around the Llangunllo area, the fields with sheep and the river scenes were filmed on the River Lugg, which rises four miles west of Llangunllo

== Release ==
The film was shown at the 1994 Toronto International Film Festival in September 1994. It was released in the United States on 30 September 1994 and grossed $86,115. In the United Kingdom, it was released on 18 November 1994 and grossed £8,913 in its opening weekend from 3 screens.

== Critical reception ==
The film holds a 100% on Rotten Tomatoes based on 6 reviews with an average rating of 6.8/10.

Channel 4 (who rated it 4.6 out of 5) wrote: "The powerful and sometimes crippling relationships between fathers and sons is the inspiration behind Menges' worthy drama".
