= Mark (2009 film) =

- Directed by: Mike Hoolboom
- Written by: Mike Hoolboom
- Produced by: Mike Hoolboom
- Starring: Mark Karbusicky; Mirha-Soleil Ross; Kristyn Dunnion
- Release date: October 22, 2009
- Running time: 70 minutes
- Country: Canada
- Language: English

Mark is a Canadian documentary film, directed by Mike Hoolboom and released in 2009. The film is a portrait of Mark Karbusicky, an artist, activist and frequent editor of Hoolboom's films who committed suicide in 2007, through a mixture of found footage, snapshots and interviews with Karbusicky's surviving friends and family.

The film faced some minor controversy around whether it could be characterized as an LGBT-themed film, given that Karbusicky was heterosexual; however, Hoolboom noted that Karbusicky was actively involved in LGBT culture as an activist ally, a collaborator of Hoolboom's and as both the romantic and creative partner of transgender artist Mirha-Soleil Ross. The film also prominently featured LGBT writer Kristyn Dunnion, who was also a close friend and creative collaborator of Karbusicky's.

The film had its theatrical premiere in Chicago in 2009. It was subsequently screened at the Hot Docs Canadian International Documentary Festival and the Inside Out Film and Video Festival in 2010, and won the jury award for Best Canadian Film at Inside Out.
