= Callum Keith Rennie =

British and Canadian actor (born 1960)

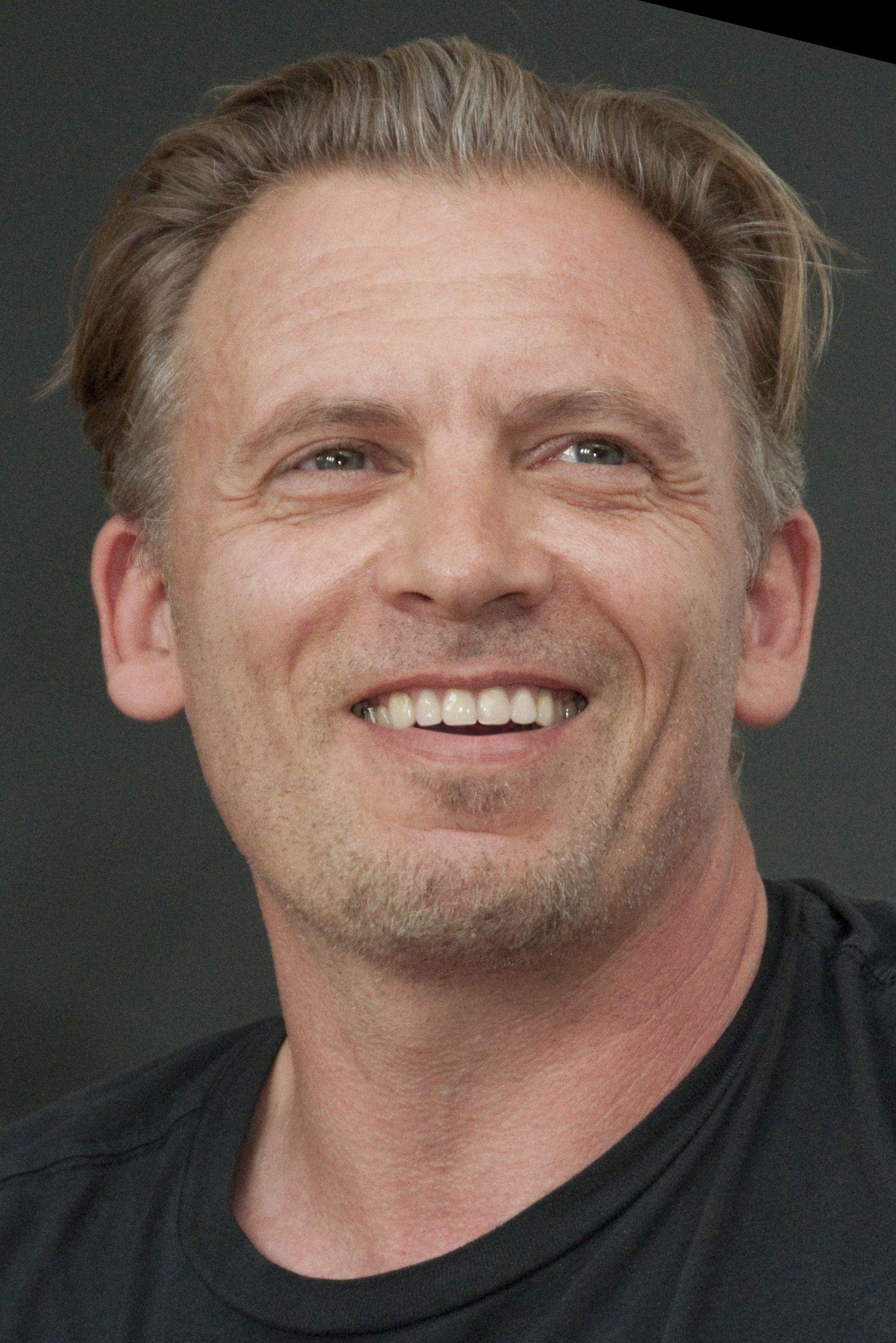
- Rennie in 2011
- Born: Callum Keith Rennie; 14 September 1960 (age 66); Sunderland, England
- Citizenship: United Kingdom; Canada
- Occupation: Actor
- Years active: 1989–present

Callum Keith Rennie (born 14 September 1960) is a British and Canadian actor. His breakthrough role was as punk rocker Billy Tallent in the music mockumentary Hard Core Logo (1996), followed by a starring role as Det. Stanley Raymond Kowalski on the third and fourth seasons of the television series Due South (1997–99). He then won a Genie Award for Best Actor in a Supporting Role for his performance in the Don McKellar film Last Night (1998).

Rennie's television roles include Leoben Conoy / Number 2 on Battlestar Galactica (2003–09), Lew Ashby on Californication (2008–13), Rick Felder on The Killing (2011–12), Gary Connell on The Man in the High Castle (2016), Karl Malus on Jessica Jones (2018), and Commander Rayner on Star Trek: Discovery (2024). He won a Gemini Award for Best Actor in a Continuing Leading Dramatic Role for his portrayal of Detective Ben Sullivan on Shattered, and a second Genie Award for the film Normal (2007). He has also won four Leo Awards.

== Early life ==
Rennie was born in Sunderland, Tyne and Wear and at age four his family emigrated to Canada. Rennie was brought up in middle-class Edmonton, Alberta, as the second of three boys. He graduated from Strathcona High School, where he met and befriended Bruce McCulloch from the Kids in the Hall. He dropped out of college and took up all sorts of odd jobs, leaving Edmonton for brief stays in Vancouver and Toronto before eventually settling in Vancouver.

== Career ==
=== Early work ===
Working at the campus radio of University of Alberta led Rennie to discover acting at age 25. He started his career on stage, performing at the A.B.O.P. Theatre in Edmonton in Amerika, a play adapted from Franz Kafka's novel and followed with the critically acclaimed American Buffalo during the Edmonton International Fringe Festival. After attending Bruhanski Theatre Studio in Vancouver, he had his first professional theatrical performance in 1989 in Sally Clark's Lost Souls and Missing Persons, a Touchstone Theatre production. This earned him an invitation to work at the Shaw Festival where he appeared in Man and Superman and in Pinero's Trelawny of the Wells (1990).

=== 1993–2001 ===
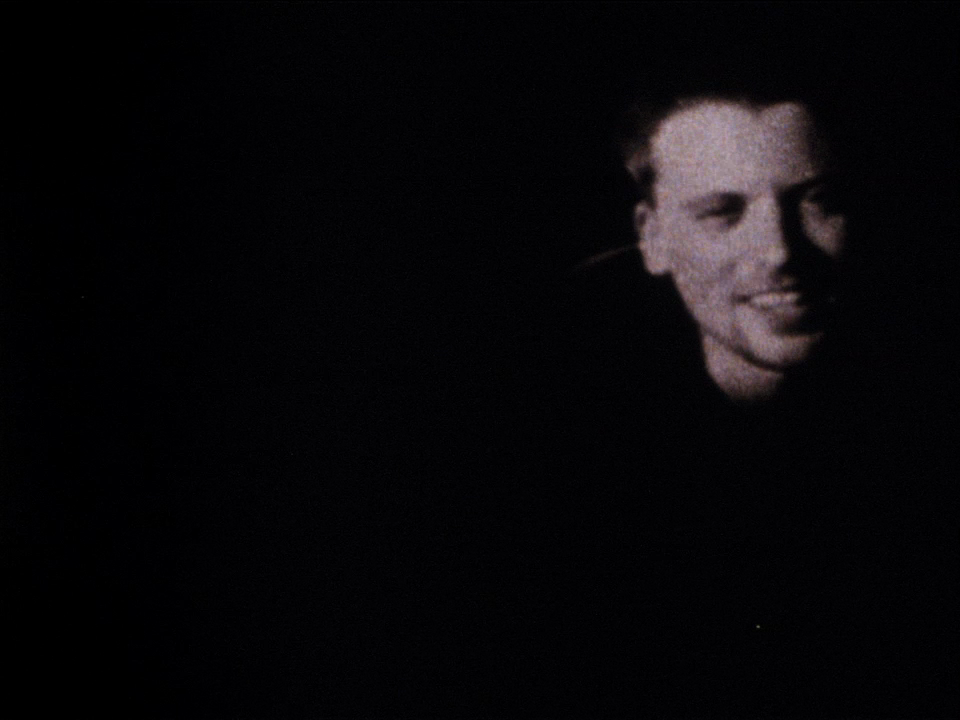
Rennie in the 1993 short film Frank's Cock

Rennie's first appearance on screen was in the indie Canadian film Purple Toast, filmed in 1990 and released in 1993. Also in 1993, he began to take small roles in television (Highlander, Forever Knight, and the revamped version of The Outer Limits). Rennie's profile within the Canadian industry was heightened during this period by leading roles in the television films Paris or Somewhere (1994) and For Those Who Hunt the Wounded Down (1996). Due to several disagreements during the production of the latter film, Rennie vowed never to work for the CBC again, though he has remained a staunch supporter of the Canadian industry as a whole. After his first appearance on The X-Files, he was offered the role of Alex Krycek but turned it down because he did not want to commit to a television series at that time.

His career gained momentum quickly and larger roles in Canadian films followed (the independent short film Frank's Cock by Mike Hoolboom, and Mina Shum's Double Happiness as Sandra Oh's love interest, for which he was nominated for a Genie Award as best supporting actor). He also had more important roles on television series, as in a two-parter for La Femme Nikita.

His most prominent early roles were as guitar player Billy Tallent in Bruce McDonald's Hard Core Logo (1996) and as detective Stanley Raymond Kowalski in the third and fourth seasons of CTV series Due South, which aired in over 150 countries. The Canadian band Billy Talent is named after his Hard Core Logo character. As for his part in Due South, it has been said that his "disaffected intensity and hungover good looks" added an edge to the series.

Rennie was then seen in the recurrent roles of the convenience store guru Newbie on Don McKellar's cult television series Twitch City and of detective Bobby Marlowe on the award-winning series Da Vinci's Inquest.

His interpretation of sex marathoner Craig Zwiller in Don McKellar's Last Night earned him his first Genie Award (1999). After a role in David Cronenberg's eXistenZ (1999), his first international success on the big screen was his appearance as the thug Dodd in Christopher Nolan's Memento (2000). The same year, he impersonated a chilling yet seductive drifter in Suspicious River.

=== 2002–present ===
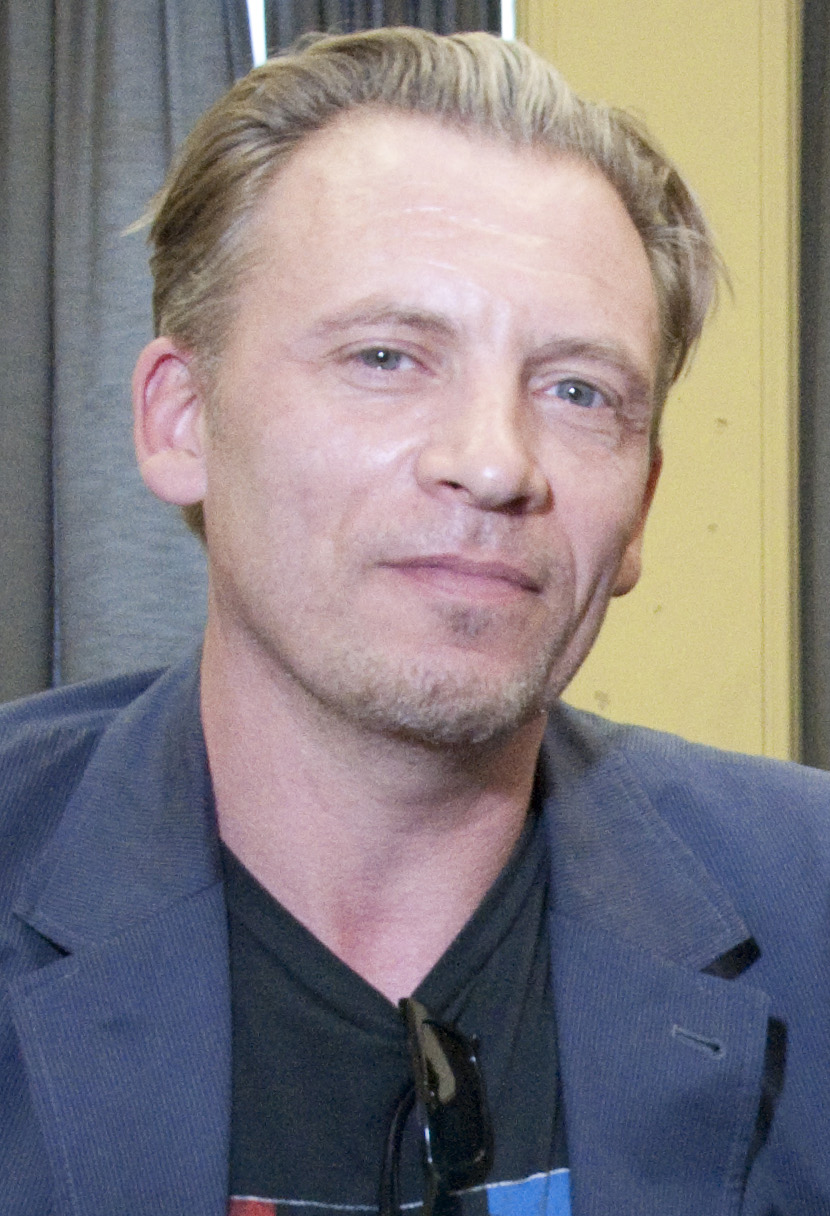
Rennie in the CFC Worldwide Short Film Festival in 2011

With the father characters of Falling Angels (2003) and Flower and Garnet (2002), Rennie expanded to playing more mature roles, rather than young, self-destructive rebels. He also impersonated self-controlled Inspector Wood in the period drama Torso: The Evelyn Dick Story (2002) and appeared as the quiet dyslexic painter of Wilby Wonderful (2004).

He has played guest roles in episodes of various Canadian or US television series like Mutant X, The Dead Zone, Smallville, Supernatural, The L Word, Bionic Woman and more recently Harper's Island. During the same time, he has interpreted contrasting characters in movies such as The Butterfly Effect, H_{2}O: the Last Prime Minister, The Five People You Meet in Heaven, Blade: Trinity (2004), Lucid (2005), Unnatural & Accidental (2006), The Invisible, Tin Man, Normal, Silk (2007), and The X-Files: I Want to Believe (2008).

His recurring role as the Cylon Leoben Conoy in the reimagined Battlestar Galactica (2003–09) and his portrayal of the record producer Lew Ashby throughout the second season of Californication (2008) have earned him a new wide and international recognition.

In 2009–10, Rennie played a character named Jeff Slingerland aka Dr. Maurice Raynaud on the ABC series FlashForward. Before the series was cancelled, David Goyer, who had previously directed him in Blade and The Invisible, mentioned he would be back and was slated to appear in the second season. He also appeared as Russian mobster Vladimir Laitanan in the eighth season of 24.

In Fall 2010, he played the lead role of Detective Brian Sullivan on Shattered, a series about a detective who suffers from multiple personality disorder. It aired in Canada on Global TV, followed by airings in other countries, though not the United States. Rennie received critical acclaim for his performance, and in 2011 won the Gemini and Leo awards for the role. Shattered was not renewed for a second season.

His 2010 appearances on the big screen included the Canadian film Gunless, a Western comedy starring Paul Gross, as a bounty hunter on the trail of Gross' Montana Kid. He also reprised his role as Billy Tallent for a short appearance in Trigger. Trigger is part of several films set in the same universe as Hard Core Logo, directed again by Bruce McDonald; this one, starring Molly Parker and Tracy Wright, written by Daniel MacIvor, is about the reunion of two women who used to be in an alternative rock band together. Rennie also served as one of Trigger's executive producers. Another film, Faith, Fraud & Minimum Wage, based on Canadian playwright Josh MacDonald's play Halo, has been completed and is waiting for release.

Rennie made a number of television appearances in 2011, including a supporting role on The Killing as Rick Felder, Detective Sarah Linden's fiancé. He also guest starred on Alphas, CSI: Miami and Rookie Blue.

Rennie was also cast as a series regular on the NBC series The Firm. He plays Ray McDeere, the brother of the principal character, Mitch McDeere, played by Josh Lucas. It began airing as a midseason replacement for the 2011–12 season.

In 2015, Rennie was cast as a main character for the second season of Amazon's The Man in the High Castle. He joined the cast in the role of Gary Connell, leader of the West Coast Resistance movement.

== Personal life ==
Rennie likes painting and admires abstract expressionist artists such as Basquiat, Motherwell and Pollock (the Champion spark-plug logo tattoo on his right arm is an homage to Stuart Davis). He was an enthusiastic mountain climber in his youth and is an avid golfer.

== Filmography ==
=== Film ===
List of films and roles
Year	Title	Role	Notes
1993	Purple Toast	Tom Struck	
1994	Valentine's Day	Astronaut	
1994	Still	Boyfriend	Short film
1994	Frank's Cock	The Narrator	Short film
1994	Double Happiness	Mark	
1994	Timecop	The Stranger	
1994	The Raffle	Floor Director	
1995	Curtis's Charm	Jim	
1996	Unforgettable	Drug Dealer	
1996	Hard Core Logo	Billy Tallent / William Boisy	
1996	Letters from Home	—N/a	Short film
1997	Masterminds	Ollie	
1997	Excess Baggage	Motel Manager	
1997	Men with Guns	Mamet	
1998	Last Night	Craig Zwiller	
1999	eXistenZ	Hugo Carlaw	
1999	The Life Before This	Martin MacLean	
2000	The Highwayman	Telemarketer	Uncredited
2000	The Last Stop	Jake	
2000	Memento	Dodd	
2000	Suspicious River	Gary Jensen	
2001	Picture Claire	Laramie	
2002	Slap Shot 2: Breaking the Ice	Palmberg	Direct to video
2002	Now & Forever	Carl Mackie	
2002	Flower & Garnet	Ed	
2003	Falling Angels	Jim Field	
2003	Paycheck	Jude, Guard	
2004	The Butterfly Effect	Jason Treborn	
2004	Wilby Wonderful	"Duck" MacDonald	
2004	Blade: Trinity	Asher Talos	
2005	Lucid	Victor	
2005	Whole New Thing	Denny	
2005	Shooting Gallery	Michael Mortenson	Direct-to-video
2006	Snow Cake	John Neil	
2006	Unnatural & Accidental	Norman	
2007	Code Name: The Cleaner	Shaw	
2007	Shattered	Detective McGill	Also known as Butterfly on the Wheel
2007	The Invisible	Brian Larson	
2007	Normal	Walt	
2007	Silk	Schuyler	
2008	Sleepwalking	Will	
2008	The X-Files: I Want to Believe	Janke Dacyshyn, 2nd Abductor	
2009	Case 39	Edward Sullivan	
2010	Faith, Fraud & Minimum Wage	Donald McCullen	
2010	Gunless	Ben Cutler	
2010	Trigger	Billy	
2013	Hell in a Handbag	Silver	
2013	The Young and Prodigious T. S. Spivet	Father	
2014	October Gale	James Matthews	
2014	Sitting on the Edge of Marlene	Freddy "Fast Freddy"	
2015	Fifty Shades of Grey	Ray Steele	
2015	Into the Forest	Robert	
2015	Born to Be Blue	Dick Bock	
2016	Warcraft	Moroes	
2017	Little Pink House	—N/a	
2017	Goon: Last of the Enforcers	Hyrum Cain	
2017	Mobile Homes	Robert	
2017	Jigsaw	Detective Halloran	
2018	Fifty Shades Freed	Ray	

=== Television ===
List of television appearances and roles
Year	Title	Role	Notes
1993	Highlander: The Series	Neal	Episode: "An Eye for an Eye"
1994	Paris or Somewhere	Christy Mahon	Television film
1994	Lonesome Dove: The Series	Harry Price	Episode: "Long Shot"
1994	The Commish	Konichek	Episode: "Security"
1994–95	The X-Files	Tommy / Cemetery Groundskeeper	Episode: "Lazarus"; Episode: "Fresh Bones"
1995	Little Criminals	Kostash	Television film
1995	Falling from the Sky: Flight 174	Pumper	Television film
1995	The Marshal	Cal	Episode: "Protection"
1995	The Outer Limits	Carlito	Episode: "Corner of the Eye"
1995	When the Dark Man Calls	Bob Levesh	Television film
1995	The Ranger, the Cook and a Hole in the Sky	Big Hat	Television film
1995	The Omen	Driver	Television film
1995	Forever Knight	Bruce Spencer	Episode: "Outside the Lines"
1995	Side Effects	Armando	Episode: "Snap, Crackle, Pop!"
1995	Highlander: The Series	Tyler King	Episode: "The Innocent"
1995–96	My Life as a Dog	Johnny Johansson	22 episodes
1996	For Those Who Hunt the Wounded Down	Jerry Bines	Television film
1997	Viper	William T. Lennox	Episode: "Wheelman"
1997	La Femme Nikita	Gray Wellman	Episode: "Gray"; Episode: "Choice"
1997	Tricks	Adam	Television film
1997–99	Due South	Detective Stanley Raymond Kowalski	26 episodes
1998–2000	Twitch City	Newbie	8 episodes
1999	Strange World	Vince	Episode: "Lullaby"
1999	Foolish Heart	Ross	Episode: "Breathless"
1999–2001	Da Vinci's Inquest	Detective Bob Marlowe	7 episodes
2000	Murder Seen	Detective Keegan	Television film
2000	Nature Boy	Eden Abez	Television short
2001	Trapped	Anthony Bellio	Television film
2001	Dice	Egon Schwimmer	Miniseries
2002	Torso: The Evelyn Dick Story	Inspector Wood	Television film
2002	Bliss	Mike	Episode: "Six Days"
2002	Dark Angel	Sheriff Lamar	Episode: "Exposure"
2002	Mutant X	Zack Lockhart	Episode: "Ex Marks the Spot"
2002	The Dead Zone	Max Cassidy	Episode: "Dinner with Dana"
2002	The Eleventh Hour	Mark Mitchum	Episode: "The Source"
2003	Tru Calling	Elliot Winters	Episode: "Pilot"
2003	Battlestar Galactica	Leoben Conoy	Miniseries
2004	Touching Evil	Mike Espy	Episode: "Memorial"
2004	Kingdom Hospital	Earl Candleton	Episodes: "Finale" & "Butterfingers"
2004	H_{2}O	Don Pritchard / Lieutenant Daniel Holt	Television film
2004	The Five People You Meet in Heaven	Eddie's Father	Television film
2004–2009	Battlestar Galactica	Leoben Conoy	20 episodes
2005	Whiskey Echo	Dr. Rollie Saunders	Television film
2005	Supernatural	Roy	Episode: "Wendigo"
2005	Painkiller Jane	Secretary of Defense Donnie Mitchell	Television film
2006	The Hunters	Quin Hunter	Television film
2006	The L Word	Danny Wilson	3 episodes
2006	Smallville	Tyler McKnight	Episode: "Fragile"
2007	Men in Trees	Jeff	Episode: "Chemical Reactions"
2007	Bionic Woman	Victor Booth	Episode: "The List"
2007	Tin Man	Zero	Miniseries
2008	Of Murder and Memory	Leonard	Television film
2008–2013	Californication	Lew Ashby	14 episodes
2009	Battlestar Galactica: The Plan	Leoben Conoy	Television film
2009	Harper's Island	John Wakefield	4 episodes
2009	Harper's Globe	John Wakefield	Episode: "There Is Only One Way Out on Harper's Island" & "Surviving Harper's Island"
2009–10	FlashForward	Jeff Slingerland / Dr. Maurice Raynaud	Episode: "The Gift" & "Course Correction"
2010	24	Vladimir Laitanan	3 episodes
2010–11	Shattered	Detective Ben Sullivan	13 episodes
2011	Alphas	Don Wilson	Episode: "Pilot"; Episode: "Anger Management"
2011	Rookie Blue	Jamie Brennan	3 episodes
2011	CSI: Miami	Jack Toller	Episode: "Mayday"; Episode: "Countermeasures"
2011–12	The Killing	Rick Felder	7 episodes
2012	The Firm	Ray McDeere	22 episodes
2015–16	Longmire	Walker Browning	6 episodes
2016	Man Seeking Woman	McQuaid	Episode: "Fuse"
2016	Legends of Tomorrow	Jon Valor	Episode: "Marooned"
2016	The Man in the High Castle	Gary Connell	8 episodes
2018	Jessica Jones	Karl Malus	6 episodes
2018–19	Impulse	Nikolai	18 episodes
2022	The Umbrella Academy	Harlan Cooper / Lester Pocket	6 episodes
2024	Star Trek: Discovery	Captain Rayner	Main role (season 5)

== Awards and nominations ==
Year	Award	Category	Work	Result	Ref.
1994	Genie Award	Best Performance by an Actor in a Supporting Role	Double Happiness	Nominated	
1997	Gemini Award	Best Performance by an Actor in a Guest Role in a Dramatic Series	Side Effects	Nominated	
1997	Gemini Award	Best Performance in a Children's or Youth Program or Series	My Life as a Dog	Won	
1998	Gemini Award	Best Performance by an Actor in a Leading Role in a Dramatic Program or Miniseries	For Those Who Hunt the Wounded Down	Nominated	
1999	Gemini Award	Best Performance by an Actor in a Continuing Leading Dramatic Role	Due South	Nominated	
1999	Genie Award	Best Performance by an Actor in a Supporting Role	Last Night	Won	
2000	Canadian Comedy Award	Film – Performance – Male	Last Night	Nominated	
2001	Leo Award	Best Performance by a Male in a Feature Length Drama	Suspicious River	Won	
2003	Vancouver Film Critics Circle	Best Actor – Canadian Film	Flower & Garnet	Won	
2003	Leo Award	Best Lead Performance by a Male in a Feature Length Drama	Flower & Garnet	Won	
2004	Leo Award	Best Lead Performance by a Male in a Feature Length Drama	Falling Angels	Nominated	
2004	Vancouver Film Critics Circle	Best Actor – Canadian Film	Falling Angels	Nominated	
2007	Leo Award	Best Lead Performance by a Male in a Feature Length Drama	Unnatural & Accidental	Won	
2008	Leo Award	Best Lead Performance by a Male in a Feature Length Drama	Normal	Nominated	
2009	Genie Award	Best Performance by an Actor in a Supporting Role	Normal	Won	
2011	Gemini Award	Best Performance by an Actor in a Continuing Leading Dramatic Role	Shattered	Won	
2011	Leo Award	Best Lead Performance by a Male in a Dramatic Series	Shattered, episode: "Out of Sorrow"	Won	
2011	Genie Award	Best Performance by an Actor in a Supporting Role	Gunless	Nominated	
2015	Leo Award	Best Guest Performance by a Male in a Dramatic Series	Motive, episode: "Pitfall"	Nominated	
