= Letters from Home (film) =

- Directed by: Mike Hoolboom
- Written by: Mike Hoolboom; Vito Russo
- Screenplay by: Mike Hoolboom
- Produced by: Mike Hoolboom
- Cinematography: Mike Hoolboom; Steve Sanguedolce
- Edited by: Mike Hoolboom
- Music by: Earle Peach
- Release date: 1996 (Canada)
- Running time: 15 minutes
- Country: Canada
- Language: English

Letters from Home is a 15-minute-long short film by Canadian director Mike Hoolboom. It follows a multitude of figures from the Toronto art community who deliver messages about living with AIDS, which are spliced with home videos, found and archive footage, and other film techniques. Letters from Home was generally well received and won several awards, including Best Canadian Short Film at the 1996 Toronto International Film Festival.

== Synopsis ==
After an initial voiceover following a dream in which the narrator chases a Cadbury chocolate bar until he sees a masked doctor who tells him he has AIDS, a woman tells of her friend who, when using a half-fare card, was told that she could not possibly be AIDS positive as she would have to be home dying. Director Mike Hoolboom's face fades in from a watery background, speaking of how he is not dying and the government is not working to save him.

Several actors and actresses deliver thoughts, first regarding maltreatment of AIDS patients by the general public, then comparing living with AIDS to fighting World War II and describing the treatment. The film then notes the work that is being done, interspersed with footage of two men kissing, but indicates that there is not enough support. It closes with Callum Keith Rennie relating how love can overcome the fear felt by AIDS victims.

== Cast ==
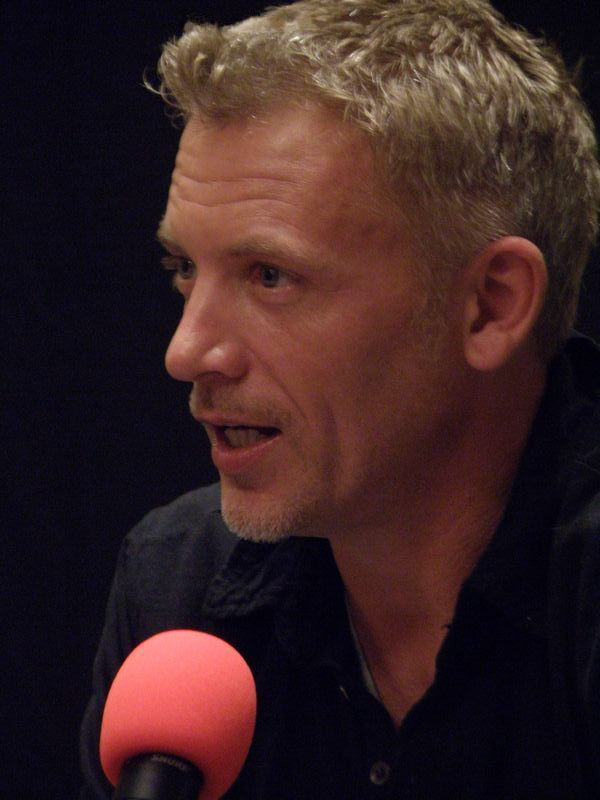
Callum Keith Rennie had previously worked with Hoolboom on Frank's Cock in 1993.

- Cameron Bailey
- Jan Bird
- Paul Couillard
- Emma Davey
- Janieta Eyre
- Allegra Fulton
- Rachael Glassman
- Ed Johnson
- Sally Lee
- Callum Keith Rennie
- Jason Romily
- Andrew Scorer
- Mario Tenorio
- Kika Thorne

== Production ==
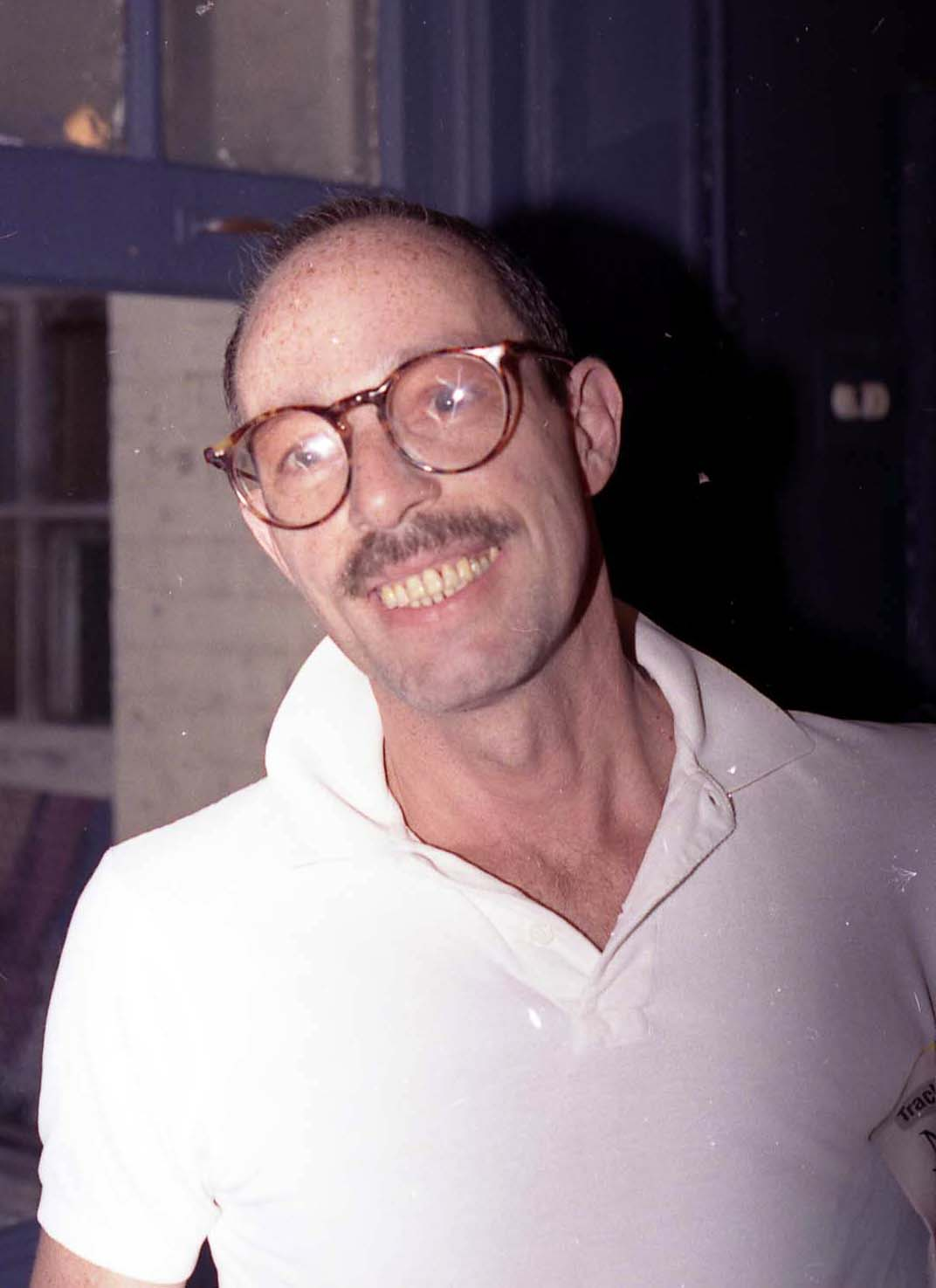
Letters from Home was based on a 1988 speech by Vito Russo.

The film's narration was primarily based on the speech "Why We Fight" by the LGBT rights activist Vito Russo, which was delivered at a protest in 1988 which Hoolboom attended. It features bits written by Hoolboom itself. The majority of actors and actresses are from Toronto, where Hoolboom had established himself; they came from a variety of racial, generational, and gender backgrounds. At the time of release, combined antiretroviral therapy was unavailable.

Letters from Home was shot on 16 mm film and has a run length of 15 minutes. It intersperses found footage with archive footage, home movies, hand-processed work, and original material. This footage includes material from Hoolboom's past, as well as archived footage of aircraft crashes, and a stuck car. It also features Billie Holiday's 1958 cover of "You've Changed", Leonard Cohen's "Waiting for a Miracle", and references to Hermann Hesse's 1927 novel Steppenwolf.

== Style ==
Janice Cole, writing in Point of View, describes the film's narration style as "part story, part confessional and part spokesperson". The American media theorist Laura Marks writes that Hoolboom's multi-narrator approach allows the viewer a greater opportunity to empathise with AIDS patients; she writes that it is a more appropriate approach to the issue than "the heroic narrative centering on an individual's suffering" present in other works. In another publication she notes that the film shows a paradox of "having a body that is yours but not", as exemplified by the opening scene.

Roger Hallas, director of the LGBT Studies Program at Syracuse University, writes that Letters from Home is based on esthetics of "fragmentation and dispersal", emphasising the multicultural cast and camera work, which varies from "talking head" close-ups to voice overs. He notes the strength of the reuse of Russo's speech, in which the activist emphasised survival before dying in 1990, with the words having been refactored to show the need to both live with AIDS and to remember those who had died of the disease.

== Reception ==
Cole praised the film, writing that lines such as "If I'm dying of anything it's the way you look at me. It's from the harsh cleanser you put on the toilet after I've used it" were highly powerful, emphasising that the general populace generally lacks knowledge on AIDS; she also noted the criticism of misinformation. A writer from the Visions du Réel film festival in Nyon, Switzerland, noted Letters from Home as showing Hoolboom's expertise in "captivat[ing] his audience" through the personal approach used. Tom McSorley, writing in Take One, found the film "achingly personal" with a "cogent, courageous rendering" of an awareness that death awaits everyone.

The film scholar Thomas Waugh, writing about Hoolboom's AIDS activism through his films, describes Letters from Home as one of a "great AIDS triptych", together with Hoolboom's earlier work Frank's Cock (1993) and the later clip Positiv; he notes that audiences often cried at screenings. Hallas writes that the film "exemplifies" the use of archival footage by LGBT media to "bear witness to the exigencies of AIDS" in modern times.

Not all reviews were positive. The filmmaker Bart Testa gave a scathing review, describing Hoolboom as a "magpie montagist" like Bonnie Sherr Klein with "dial-a-stylistic" touches found throughout the short.

The short was shown at numerous film festivals, both in Canada and abroad. At the 1996 Toronto International Film Festival, it won Best Canadian Short Film; the judges remarked that it had "stunning vision and intensely moving testimony of life in the age of AIDS". The film also received two awards at the International Short Film Festival Oberhausen in Oberhausen, Germany.

In 2010 Letters from Home was released as part of a two-disc DVD set of films and testimonials related to HIV/AIDS. Released by the Université du Québec à Montréal and subtitled by Waugh, the film was paired with Esther Vasquette's Le Récit d'A.
