= Silent Witness (1994 film) =

1994 Canadian documentary film

- Directed by: Harriet Wichin
- Written by: Harriet Wichin
- Produced by: Christine York
- Cinematography: Janusz Polom
- Edited by: Hedy Dab
- Music by: Chris Crilly; Harriet Wichin
- Production company: Wichin-York Film
- Release date: September 1994 (TIFF)
- Running time: 74 minutes
- Country: Canada
- Language: English

Silent Witness is a Canadian documentary film, directed by Harriet Wichin and released in 1994. The film documents the efforts of Holocaust survivors to preserve the sites of death camps such as Auschwitz and Dachau as museums.

One of the most unusual features of the film, relative to most Holocaust-related documentaries, is that it features no imagery taken directly from the Holocaust itself, instead depicting the camps entirely in their modern form and allowing the testimonies of Wichin's interview subjects to convey the horrors of the original events.

The film premiered at the 1994 Toronto International Film Festival.

The film received a Genie Award nomination for Best Feature Length Documentary at the 16th Genie Awards in 1995.
