= Artie Shaw: Time Is All You've Got =

1986 film directed by Brigitte Berman

- Directed by: Brigitte Berman
- Written by: Brigitte Berman
- Produced by: Brigitte Berman; Don Haig
- Narrated by: Brigitte Berman
- Cinematography: James Aquila; Mark Irwin
- Edited by: Brigitte Berman
- Music by: Artie Shaw
- Production company: Bridge Film Productions
- Distributed by: Cinephile
- Release date: 25 October 1985
- Running time: 115 minutes
- Country: Canada
- Language: English

Artie Shaw: Time Is All You've Got is a 1985 Canadian documentary film about clarinetist Artie Shaw. It was written, directed and narrated by Brigitte Berman (who first interviewed Shaw in her 1981 documentary about Bix Beiderbecke titled Bix: Ain't None of Them Play Like Him Yet).

== Aftermath ==
In 1987, after the film won the Oscar, Shaw sued Berman on the grounds that as Artie Shaw: Time Is All You've Got had become more critically and commercially successful than had been expected, he was entitled to receive a greater share of the film's profits. His lawsuit was dismissed in Ontario Superior Court in 1997.

== Accolades ==
The film was a Genie Award nominee for Best Feature Length Documentary at the 7th Genie Awards in 1986.

At the 59th Academy Awards in 1987, it won the Academy Award for Best Documentary Feature, tying with Lee Grant's Down and Out in America.

It also won first prize at the Valladolid Film Festival in Spain in 1986.

== Restoration ==
A new 4K resolution print of Artie Shaw: Time Is All You've Got was slated to screen in the TIFF Classics program at the 2023 Toronto International Film Festival, in advance of being permanently archived in the collection of the Film Reference Library. The screening took place on 9 September 2023.

It also premiered on January 5, 2024 at Film Forum in New York City and December 15 at Ted Mann Theater in Los Angeles that same year.

It was released on Blu-ray by Film Movement Classics in April 2025 with director's commentary and a 16-page booklet featuring an essay by jazz writer Bill Milkowski.
