= Sarah Radclyffe =

British film producer

- Born: Sarah Radclyffe; 14 November 1950 (age 76)
- Occupation: Film producer
- Years active: 1979–present

Sarah Radclyffe (born 14 November 1950), sometimes credited as Sarah Radcliffe, is a British film producer and co-founder of Working Title Films.

== Career ==
Radclyffe began working as associative producer in the late 1970s on such films as The Tempest (1979) directed by Derek Jarman.

From 1983 to 1984 she worked on the series The Comic Strip Presents and in 1983 she founded the production company Working Title Films together with business partner Tim Bevan. The company's first significant production, Stephen Frears film My Beautiful Laundrette, was released in 1985. Radclyffe left Working Title in 1991. The other theatrical films on which Sarah Radclyffe served as executive producer include Caravaggio (1986), Wish You Were Here (1987), Sammy and Rosie Get Laid (1988), A World Apart (1988), Edward II (1991), Sirens (1994), Second Best (1994), Les Misérables (1998), The Lost Son (1999) and The War Zone (1999) for which she was nominated for the European Film Award. She was also executive producer of Cirque du Freak: The Vampire's Assistant which was released in 2009.

== Personal life ==
She has been married to William Penton Godfrey since 1996 and has two sons, Sam and Callum.

As of 2018 Radclyffe is a trustee of Anno's Africa, the children's arts charity. Radclyffe previously served on the Boards of the British Film Institute and the UK Film Council.
