= Gariné Torossian =

Canadian filmmaker

- Occupation: Filmmaker
- Awards: 1st prize, Berlinale, 1st prize, Warsaw Int. Film Festival, gold prize Houston Film Festival, best short Melbourne Int. Film Festival, DAAD Fellow Berlin

Gariné Torossian is a Canadian filmmaker. Her works include Stone, Time, Touch which won best documentary at the Warsaw International Film Festival in 2007. Her films have screened at MoMa, the Telluride Film Festival (Colorado), Lux Cinema (London), the Egyptian Theatre (Los Angeles), the Jerusalem Film Festival, the Warsaw International Film Festival, Berlinale, and a host of cinematheques, including those in Berlin, Edmonton, Ottawa, Winnipeg and Vancouver. Torossian's debut short, Visions (1992), was part of a retrospective at Centre Pompidou when she was 22. Her subsequent shorts were screened at New York Museum of Modern Art Cineprobe series when she was 25, and at the Spielberg theatre at the Egyptian in Los Angeles (2019). Torossian's work has been broadcast on Arte France, Documentary Channel (Canada), Bravo Canada, Sundance Channel (USA), SBS (Australia) and WTN (Canada). Her films focus on notions of memory, longing and identity, underlined by her diverse and comprehensive filmography.

== Awards ==
Girl from Moush (1994) was awarded best short at the Melbourne International Film Festival. Torossian was commissioned by the American indie rock band Sparklehorse to produce a music video. The resulting short film, SPARKLEHORSE (1999), received commendation at the 2000 Berlinale, the Berlin International Film Festival. Her short film featuring the music of Sparklehorse, BABIES ON THE SUN (2001), received the Panorama short film prize at the Berlinale, the Berlin International Film Festival. HOKEES won a gold prize for drama at the Houston Film Festival (2000) and best short at the Los Angeles AFFMA Film Festival (2000). Torossian's Stone Time Touch (2007) is a feature-length documentary filmed mostly in Armenia. It was awarded best documentary feature at the Warsaw International Film Festival (2007). She was awarded a DAAD (Berliner Künstlerprogramm) filmmaker fellowship in Berlin in 2007. In 2019, Girl from Moush was selected to be part of the Panorama 40, for the 40th anniversary of the birth of the Panorama at the Berlinale.

== Critical reviews ==
"The Yerevan brilliantly indexed in An Inventory of Some Strictly Visible Things bears little resemblance to the hallucinatory Armenia of Girl From Moush. An Inventory’s (2017) crisply shot and starkly lit digital renderings belong to the here and now rather than there and then... I watched a retrospective of Torossian’s work hosted by the Los Angeles Filmforum at the Egyptian Theatre in July. It was the first retrospective program of her films in Los Angeles — a staggering fact given her monumental contributions to feminist diasporic cinema over the past quarter-century." From Hyperallergic, Mashinka Firunts (2019)

"In a nod to Perec, Torossian’s An Inventory of Some Strictly Visible Things is a riveting account of the everyday in a small post-Soviet republic: a country obsessed with the catastrophic... It is a powerful celebration of the extraordinary in the ordinary; an essential respite from the white noise of the White House, and the tyranny of the headline." —BOMB (2017)

"In a national culture seemingly obsessed with identity, the careening, intense, arresting works of Gariné Torossian are poetic cinematic searches for and expressions of those very elusive notions of belonging and identification that make her an idiosyncratic yet quintessentially Canadian artist. Formally freewheeling and merging the visual languages of Super 8, 35mm, and video, her body of work is one of the most startling and original to have emerged in Canada over the last decade and a half."—Tom McSorley, executive director, Canadian Film Institute (2010).

"Torossian put together a stunning piece that comments on and extends Atom Egoyan's film's structure and themes. The resulting six-minute meditation on a homeland she has yet to visit, Girl from Moush, transforms the iconic architectural stills into a river of images."—from Image and Territory, Adam Gilders, edited by Monique Tschofen (2006)

"In 2002, she won the Panorama short film prize at the Berlinale for "Babies on the Sun" (2001), five impressive minutes in which Torossian nostalgically traces memories of childhood." —Berliner Kunstlerprogramm (2007)

"Torossian, a filmmaker whose work was featured at MoMA during a one-woman Cineprobe program in 1995, created a personal and somewhat autobiographical work for her first feature STONE TIME TOUCH. In search of her identity, she visits Armenia, the land of her forebears, and makes a vivid and impressionistic diary of beauty, wonderment, and sadness."—Laurence Kardish, Senior Curator at MoMa, Department of Film

"One of Canada's most original filmmakers."—Liam Lacey, Globe & Mail

== Filmography ==
- 1992 – VISIONS (4min, 16mm, Color) Director, Editor, Cinematographer
- 1993 – PLATFORM (8min, 16mm, Color) Director, Editor, Cinematographer
- 1994 – GIRL FROM MOUSH (5min, 16mm, Color) Director, Editor, Cinematographer
- 1995 – DROWNING IN FLAMES (25min, 16mm, Color) Director, Editor, Cinematographer
- 1996 – MY OWN OBSESSION (30min, 16mm, Color) Director, Editor, Cinematographer
- 1997 – PASSION CRUCIFIED (22min. 16mm, Color) Director, Editor
- 1998 – POMEGRANATE TREE (3 min, 16 mm, Color) Director, Editor, Cinematographer
- 1999 – RED BRICK (5 min, Video) Director, Cinematographer
- 1999 – SPARKLEHORSE (9 min, 16mm, Color) Director, Editor, Cinematographer
- 2000 – DUST (6 min, Video) Director, Editor, Cinematographer
- 2000 – DEATH TO EVERYONE (6 min, 16 mm, Color) Director, Editor, Cinematographer
- 2000 – HOKEES (25 min, 16mm, Color) Director
- 2001 – BABIES ON THE SUN (5min, 16 mm) Director, Editor, Cinematographer
- 2002 – SHADOWY ENCOUNTERS (15 min, 16 mm) Director, Editor, Cinematographer
- 2003 – GARDEN IN KHORKHOM (14 min, Video) Director, Editor, Cinematographer
- 2004 – SANDIAS EUSTASY (10min) Director, Producer, Editor
- 2005 – HYPNOTIZE / MEZMERIZE (11 min, Video, System of a Down rock band), Director
- 2007 – ELECT THE DEAD (3min, Color, Music Video) Director, Editor, Cinematographer
- 2007 – STONE, TIME, TOUCH (74 min, Color) Director, Editor, Cinematographer
- 2008 – COME AROUND (5 min, Video) Director, Editor, Cinematographer
- 2017 – LA STRUCTURE EST POURRIE, CAMARADE (9 min, Color, Video) Director, Editor
- 2017 – AN INVENTORY OF SOME STRICTLY VISIBLE THINGS (4 min, Color, Video) Director
- 2022 - HERE AND THERE (22min, Color, Video)
