= Tracking Down Maggie =

- Directed by: Nick Broomfield
- Produced by: Nick Broomfield; Riete Oord
- Cinematography: Barry Ackroyd
- Edited by: Susan J. Bloom; Rick Vick
- Music by: David Bergeaud
- Production company: Lafayette Films
- Distributed by: Channel 4 Television Corporation
- Release date: August 1994 (Switzerland)
- Running time: 87 minutes
- Country: United Kingdom
- Language: English

Tracking Down Maggie is a 1994 documentary film by Nick Broomfield about former British prime minister Margaret Thatcher. What begins as a genuine attempt to get an interview with the so-called 'Iron Lady' quickly turns into a game of cat-and-mouse in the United States, with the filmmaker snubbed at every turn.

Aside from the comedy of Broomfield's repeatedly failing attempts to gain access, the film discusses the accusations that Thatcher's son, Mark, used his mother's connections to effect arms deals in Saudi Arabia.
