= Stone, Time, Touch =

Stone, Time, Touch is a 2007 documentary made by Gariné Torossian about the relationship of three Armenian women from the diaspora with the land of Armenia. The young woman (played by Kamee Abrahamian) is visiting Armenia for the first time. The older woman, Arsinée Khanjian has a more conflicted and analytical perspective of her identity and her relationship with the fledgling democracy, one of the former Soviet Union republics. She has been to landlocked Armenia many times and comments on photos taken by French photographer Marc Baguelin. The third trajectory is more subtle and is represented by Gariné Torossian herself, whose face is super imposed from time to time in this stylistically layered documentary.

== Awards ==
Stone, Time, Touch has been awarded the prize for "Best Creative Documentary" at the 23rd Warsaw Film Festival (Warsaw, Poland).
