= Film Reference Library =

Film research collection in Toronto

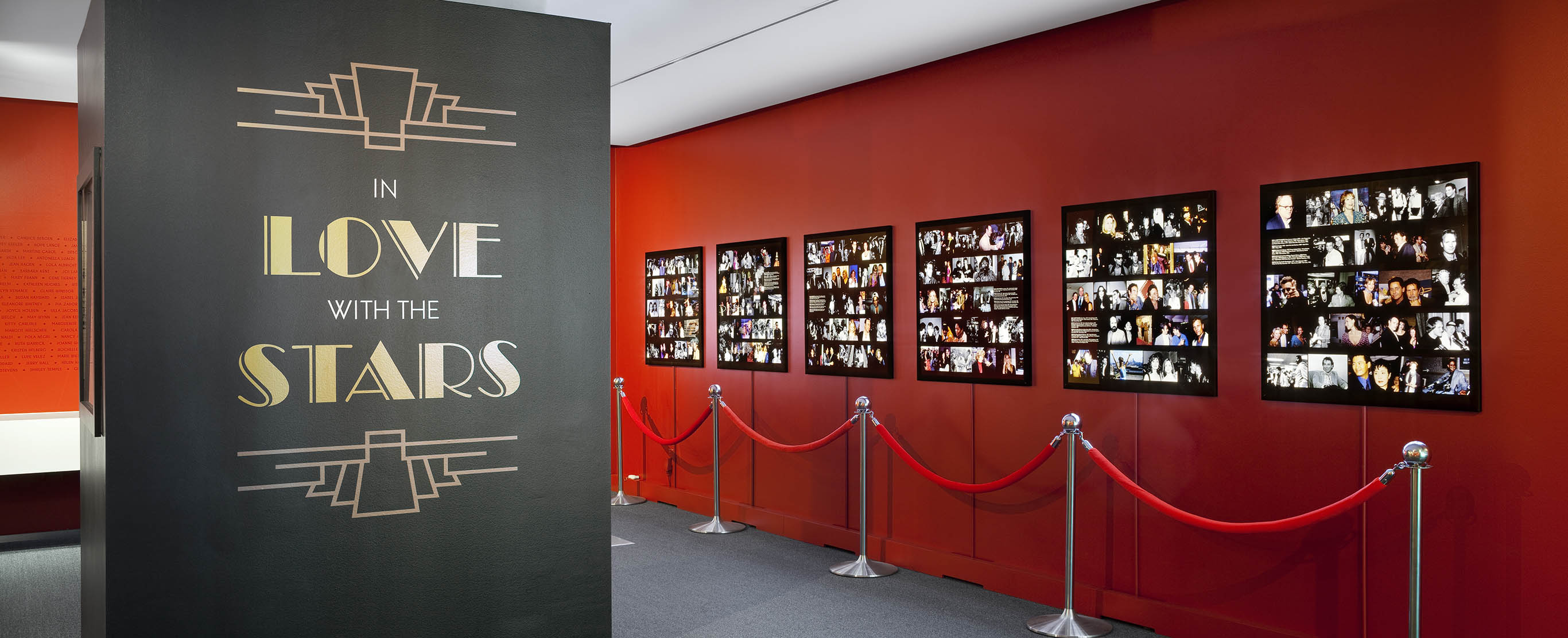
- In Love with the Stars exhibition inside the Film Reference Library at TIFF Bell Lightbox
- Location: Toronto, Ontario, Canada
- Type: Film research library
- Established: 1990

Other information
- Website: tiff.net/library/

The Film Reference Library (FRL) is Canada’s film research collection located on the 4th floor of TIFF Bell Lightbox, a cultural centre in Toronto, Ontario, Canada. The library is a free resource for students, filmmakers, scholars, and journalists. The library is affiliated to International Federation of Film Archives (FIAF), to promote Canadian and global film scholarship by collecting, preserving, and providing access to a comprehensive collection of film prints, and film-related reference resources including books, periodicals, scripts, research files, movies, press kits.

== History ==
The Library assumed operation of the Ontario Film Institute in 1990, when the Province of Ontario selected the Library to be guardian of its film-related holdings and continue the dedicated work of Gerald Pratley, founder of the OFI, by collecting and preserving materials indispensable to film education, production and research.

== Reference collection ==
The library contains 60,000 film research files, which include presskits, photographs, and clippings, 20,000 book titles, 13,000 film, 2000 film scripts, 700 magazine and journal titles, 80 Special Collections, and a large and varied selection of other research materials, including 300,000 images, 11,000 posters, 6000 soundtracks and television titles.

== Special collections ==
The Film Reference Library houses over 80 Special Collections that illuminate the history of Canadian cinema. The Special Collections are composed of original archival records: audiovisual material and film elements; print materials, festival catalogues, as well as shooting scripts and production notes.

The library's holdings include the personal research archives of film journalist and celebrity interviewer Brian Linehan, in whose memory the library's public reading room is named.

== Exhibition ==
Previous exhibitions include:

- In Love with the Stars, September 8, 2015 – April 2, 2016
- The Unseen Seen, April 10, 2015 – June 14, 2015
- The Booth, May 2, 2014 – 15 June 15, 2014
- X-Men Master: Gordon Smith, August 17, 2012 – March 31, 2013
- Otherworldly: The Art of Canadian Costume Design, September 2, 2011 – April 1, 2012
- Mary Pickford and the Invention of the Movie Star, January 13, 2011 – July 3, 2011

== See also ==
- List of libraries
- TIFF Cinematheque
- Toronto Reference Library
