= Mike Hoolboom =

Canadian filmmaker (born 1959)

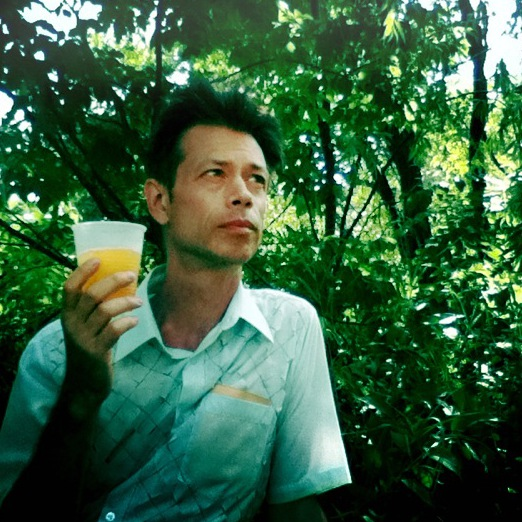
- Hoolboom, 2011
- Born: 1 January 1959 (age 67); Toronto, Ontario, Canada
- Education: Sheridan College
- Occupation: Film director
- Years active: 1980s–present
- Notable work: Frank's Cock; Letters from Home
- Awards: Governor General's Award in Visual and Media Arts

Michael Hoolboom (born 1 January 1959) is a Canadian independent, experimental filmmaker. Having begun filmmaking at an early age, Hoolboom released his first major work, a "film that's not quite a film" entitled White Museum, in 1986. Although he continued to produce films, his rate of production improved drastically after he was diagnosed with HIV in 1988 or 1989; this gave a "new urgency" to his works. Since then he has made dozens of films, two of which have won Best Short Film at the Toronto International Film Festival. His films have also featured in more than 200 film festivals worldwide.

== Early life and career ==
Hoolboom was born in Toronto, Ontario, to a Dutch father and Dutch-Indonesian mother on 1 January 1959. He took up filmmaking at an early age, using the family's Super 8 camera, and did his high school education in Burlington, Ontario.

In 1980 Hoolboom enrolled at Sheridan College in Oakville, Ontario. During his three years there he became known for his works which, according to Canadian film critic Geoff Pevere, "demonstrated a consuming interest in navigating the outer limits of perception, of language, of self, of mechanical reproduction, of bodily sensation and experience". He found wide accolade in 1986 with the release of a "film that's not quite a film", White Museum, a 32-minute work which spliced audio clips of pop culture media and commentary on the state of film over a clear leader. Many of his films during the late 1980s, such as From Home (1988) and Eat (1989), dealt with various aspects of the body.

Hoolboom, while serving a two-year stint at the Canadian Filmmakers Distribution Centre, was diagnosed with HIV in 1989, after going to donate blood. In the six years following his diagnosis he made a further 27 films, with his focus changing to the impermanence of existence, sexuality, and HIV/AIDS. This period has been noted as having a "new urgency". He also ran a magazine on fringe films, The Independent Eye.

In the mid-1990s Hoolboom won Best Canadian Short Film at the Toronto International Film Festival (TIFF) twice, first with 1993's Frank's Cock. The eight-minute film dealt with an unnamed man, portrayed by Callum Keith Rennie, who considered himself the "Michael Jordan of sex", losing his lover Frank to AIDS. The story was conveyed with a monologue occupying a quadrant of a four-part split-screen, with other quadrants including popular art, gay pornography, and representations of human creation. When accepting the award at TIFF, Hoolboom quipped "Frank's Cock has never seemed so large". That year also saw the creation of two further works: Valentine's Day, which followed a man who splurged on making a film after being diagnosed with AIDS; and Kanada, in which Wayne Gretzky serves as prime minister and uses broadcast rights for a civil war to pay off the Canada's debt. Robert Everett-Green of The Globe and Mail wrote that Valentine's Day was reminiscent of the works of Marquis de Sade and the 1973 French/Italian film La Grande Bouffe.

Three years later, in 1996, Hoolboom released Letters From Home, based in part on a speech by LGBT rights activist Vito Russo. The 15-minute film features commentary on popular misconceptions of AIDS and ways that the general public deal with AIDS patients before ending on an optimistic note, expressing hope that the AIDS crisis would one day be over. In 1998 he released the feature-length film Panic Bodies, a six-part work dealing with aspects of the body which, according to Hoolboom, is fragmented like AIDS fragments the body. That year he also released Plague Years: A Life in Underground Movies, a book which blends aspects of film scripts and autobiographical writing.

A four-minute film tribute to Hoolboom by Wrik Mead, entitled Hoolboom, was sponsored by Arts Toronto and debuted in 1999. The following year Hoolboom released Inside the Pleasure Dome: Fringe Film in Canada, a series of 23 interviews with Canadian fringe filmmakers regarding the industry, with a foreword by Atom Egoyan.

== Later film work ==
Hoolboom made Tom, a biopic of the New York-based avant-garde filmmaker Tom Chomont, in 2002, using layering to explore themes common in Chomont's work while exploring the latter's sometimes-incestuous relationship with his brother. This was followed by Imitations of Life, a ten-segmented film which, through the reuse of film clips from mainstream media, deals with how film and popular culture can affect one's memory. He helped establish Fringe Online, which presents fringe works by Canadian directors, in 2004. Hoolboom released his debut novel, The Steve Machine, in 2008; he had previously published several non-fiction works.

In 2009 Hoolboom received the Bell Award in Video Art, presented by the Canada Council for the Arts for "exceptional contribution to the advancement of video art and practices in Canada". That year he released the book Practical Dreamers: Conversations with Movie Artists, which profiled 27 Canadian independent film artists, and made Mark, a look into the life of his friend, political activist and filmmaker Mark Karbusicky, which combined the found footage and biography genres.

In 2014 an International Jury composed by Eva Truffaut, Benjamin Cantu, ricci/forte, Manuele Fior and Mathilde Bayle awarded his Buffalo Death Mask as best short film in the International Competition Queer Short of Sicilia Queer filmfest.

In 2016 Hoolboom and Chase Joynt coauthored the non-fiction book You Only Live Twice: Sex, Death and Transition. The book received a Lambda Literary Award nomination for Transgender Non-Fiction at the 29th Lambda Literary Awards in 2017.

== Reception ==
Cameron Bailey, writing in the Canadian fashion magazine Flare, described Hoolboom as "Canada's most important avant-garde filmmaker since Michael Snow"; Liam Lacey, writing for The Globe and Mail, echoes the description, adding that Hoolboom is also "one of the best chroniclers of other fringe filmmakers". His works had been shown at over 200 film festivals by 1998.

== Awards ==
Hoolboom was awarded a Governor General's Award in Visual and Media Arts in 2017.

== Filmography ==
Hoolboom has released more than fifty films in the course of his career. However, the exact number is uncertain because he regularly "prunes and reshapes his filmography: cutting some films, merging others and completely removing others from circulation." The CBC notes that several of his films have been completely destroyed.

- White Museum (1986)
- Song for Mixed Choir (1988)
- Now, Yours (1988)
- From Home (1988)
- Eat (1989)
- The Big Show (1989)
- Southern Pine Inspection Bureau No 9 (1990)
- Modern Times (1991)
- Mexico (1992)
- Indusium (1993)
- Valentine's Day (1993)
- Frank's Cock (1993)
- Kanada (1993)
- Escape in Canada (1993)
- House of Pain (1995–98)
- Letters From Home (1996)
- Panic Bodies (1998)
- Tom (2002)
- Imitations of Life (2002)
- In The Dark (2003)
- The Invisible Man (2003)
- Public Lighting (2004)
- Fascination (2006)
- Mark (2009)
- Forest Walk (2011)
- Lacan Palestine (2012)
- Buffalo Death Mask (2013)
- Scrapbook (2015)
- Judy Versus Capitalism (2020)

== Bibliography ==
Non-Fiction

- Plague Years: A Life in Underground Movies. Toronto: YYZ Books. 1998. ISBN 978-0-920397-21-3.
- Inside the Pleasure Dome: Fringe Film in Canada. Toronto: Coach House Books. 2000. ISBN 978-1-55245-099-4.
- Practical Dreamers: Conversations with Movie Artists. Toronto: Coach House Books. 2008. ISBN 978-1-55245-200-4.
- The Beauty is Relentless: The Short Movies of Emily Vey Duke and Cooper Battersby. Toronto: Coach House Books. 2012. ISBN 978-0968211557.
- Chase Joynt and Mike Hoolboom (2016). You Only Live Twice: Sex, Death and Transition. Toronto: Coach House Books. ISBN 978-1-55245-331-5.

Fiction

- The Steve Machine. Toronto: Coach House Books. 2008. ISBN 978-1-77056-217-2.
