= List of Canadian films of 2002 =

This is a list of Canadian films which were released in 2002:

Title	Director	Cast	Genre	Notes
Alice's Odyssey (L'Odyssée d'Alice Tremblay)	Denise Filiatrault	Sophie Lorain, Martin Drainville, Louise Portal, Marc Béland, Mitsou	Fantasy comedy	
Ararat	Atom Egoyan	David Alpay, Charles Aznavour, Christopher Plummer, Bruce Greenwood, Marie-Josée Croze, Brent Carver, Arsinée Khanjian, Elias Koteas	Drama	A film about the Armenian genocide; Canada-France co-production
Aspiration	Constant Mentzas	Nicolino Marinacci	Short drama	
The Baroness and the Pig	Michael Mackenzie	Patricia Clarkson, Colm Feore, Caroline Dhavernas, Louise Marleau	Drama	
The Bay of Love and Sorrows	Tim Southam	Peter Outerbridge, Jonathan Scarfe, Joanne Kelly, Elaine Cassidy	Drama	
Between Strangers	Edoardo Ponti	Sophia Loren, Mira Sorvino, Deborah Kara Unger, Pete Postlethwaite, Malcolm McDowell, Gérard Depardieu, Klaus Maria Brandauer	Drama	Canada-Italy co-production directed by Sophia Loren's son, Edoardo Ponti
Blue Skies	Ann Marie Fleming	Alessandro Juliani, Stephanie Morgenstern	Short drama	
Bollywood/Hollywood	Deepa Mehta	Rahul Khanna, Lisa Ray, Moushumi Chatterjee, Dina Pathak, Ranjit Chowdhry, Jessica Paré	Romantic comedy, Drama	Genie Award - Screenplay
The Book of Eve	Claude Fournier	Claire Bloom, Daniel Lavoie, Susannah York, Julian Glover	Drama	Based on the novel by Constance Beresford-Howe
Les Boys III	Louis Saia	Marc Messier, Rémy Girard, Patrick Huard, Serge Thériault, Michel Barrette	Comedy	Golden Reel Award
The Brainwashers (Les Ramoneurs cérébraux)	Patrick Bouchard		Animated short	
The Burial Society	Nicholas Racz	Rob LaBelle, Jan Rubeš, Allan Rich, Bill Meilen, David Paymer	Thriller	
Catch Me If You Can	Steven Spielberg	Leonardo DiCaprio, Tom Hanks, Christopher Walken, Martin Sheen, Nathalie Baye	Biographical crime comedy-drama	
Chaos and Desire (La Turbulence des fluides)	Manon Briand	Pascale Bussières, Jean-Nicolas Verreault, Geneviève Bujold	Drama	Canada-France co-production
Claire's Hat: The Unmaking of a Film	Bruce McDonald	Juliette Lewis, Gina Gershon, Mickey Rourke	Documentary	A documentary about the making of Picture Claire, which went direct to DVD. It had a one-time screening at TIFF.
Claude Jutra: An Unfinished Story	Paule Baillargeon	Claude Jutra	Documentary	
Clearing Skies (Une éclaircie sur le fleuve)	Rosa Zacharie	Jean Lapointe, Isabel Richer	Short drama	
The Collector (Le Collectionneur)	Jean Beaudin	Maude Guérin, Luc Picard	Drama	Prix Jutra – Supporting Actor (Picard)
Cube 2: Hypercube	Andrzej Sekuła	Kari Matchett, Geraint Wyn Davies	Sci-fi, Horror	Sequel to 1997's Cube
Dracula: Pages from a Virgin's Diary	Guy Maddin	Johnny W. Chang, Tara Birtwhistle and members of the Royal Winnipeg Ballet	Dance film/ Horror from the novel by Bram Stoker	Made for TV
Duct Tape Forever	Eric Till	Steve Smith, Patrick McKenna, Bob Bainborough, Graham Greene	Comedy	
Evelyn: The Cutest Evil Dead Girl	Brad Peyton	Nadia Litz; narrated by Maurice Dean Wint	Short Black comedy	
A Falconer's Chronicle (Rien sans pennes)	Marc Girard		Documentary	
Les Fils de Marie	Carole Laure	Carole Laure, Jean-Marc Barr, Danny Gilmore	Family drama	
Flower & Garnet	Keith Behrman	Callum Keith Rennie, Jane McGregor, Colin Roberts, Dov Tiefenbach, Kristen Thomson	Drama	Claude Jutra Award
Flux	Christopher Hinton		Animated short	
FUBAR: The Movie	Michael Dowse	Dave Lawrence, Paul Spence	Mockumentary	Debuted at Sundance
Gambling, Gods and LSD	Peter Mettler		Documentary	Genie Award – Documentary; Canada-Switzerland co-production
Global Heresy	Sidney J. Furie	Peter O'Toole, Joan Plowright, Alicia Silverstone, Jaimz Woolvett	Comedy	Canada-U.K. co-production
Heart of America	Uwe Boll	Jürgen Prochnow, María Conchita Alonso, Clint Howard, Miles Meadows, Brendan Fletcher, Lochlyn Munro	Drama	Canada-German co-production
Hit and Run	Richard Jutras	Isabelle Miquelon, Serge Dupire	Short drama	
The Hungry Squid	John Weldon		National Film Board animated short	Genie Award - Animated short
In Store (En magasin)	Mario Bonenfant	Jacques L'Heureux, Johanne-Marie Tremblay, Julie Deslauriers	Short drama	
Inertia	Sean Garrity	Jonas Chernick, Sarah Constable, Gordon Tanner	Drama	TIFF – Best Canadian First Feature
Inside (Histoire de pen)	Michel Jetté	Emmanuel Auger, Karyne Lemieux, David Boutin, Dominic Darceuil	Prison drama	
Leaving Metropolis	Brad Fraser	Troy Ruptash, Vincent Corazza, Lynda Boyd	Drama	Script and play (Poor Super Man) by Brad Fraser
Lonesome Joe	Mark Sawers	Adrien Dorval, Paul McGillion, Brent Stait	Short drama	
Looking for Leonard	Matt Bissonnette, Steven Clark	Benjamin Ratner, Darcy Belsher, Kim Huffman, Joel Bissonnette	Comedy-drama	
Marion Bridge	Wiebke von Carolsfeld	Molly Parker, Rebecca Jenkins, Stacy Smith, Elliot Page	Drama	TIFF – Best Canadian First Feature
The Marsh (Le Marais)	Kim Nguyen	Paul Ahmarani, James Hyndman	Drama	
Max	Menno Meyjes	John Cusack, Noah Taylor, Leelee Sobieski, Molly Parker	Historical biodrama on the early years of Hitler	Genie Award - Sound Editing; Canada-Hungary co-production made with U.S. financing
Men with Brooms	Paul Gross	Paul Gross, Leslie Nielsen, Kari Matchett, Molly Parker, Michelle Nolden, Peter Outerbridge, James Allodi, Jed Rees	Comedy	
Metronome	Daniel Cockburn	Daniel Cockburn	Experimental short	Jury Award - Best Canadian Film/Video/Installation, Media City Film Festival 2003
Miss 501: A Portrait of Luck	Jules Karatechamp	Burger	Documentary	
My Little Eye	Marc Evans	Sean Cw Johnson, Kris Lemche, Stephen O'Reilly, Laura Regan, Jennifer Sky	Drama	Canada-U.K.-France co-production made with U.S. financing
The Mysterious Miss C. (La Mystérieuse Mademoiselle C.)	Richard Ciupka	Marie-Chantal Perron, Gildor Roy	Children's comedy	
Nearest to Heaven (Au plus près du paradis)	Tonie Marshall	Catherine Deneuve, William Hurt, Bernard Le Coq, Hélène Fillières	Romance	Canada-France-Spain co-production
The Negro (Le Nèg')	Robert Morin	Iannicko N'Doua-Légaré, Béatrice Picard, Robin Aubert, Vincent Bilodeau, Sandrine Bisson	Drama	
North Station (Station Nord)	Jean-Claude Lord	Benoît Brière, Renée Claude	Comedy	
Ocean (Océan)	Catherine Martin		Documentary	
On Their Knees	Anais Granofsky	Anais Granofsky, Ingrid Veninger, Jackie Burroughs, Julian Richings, Maury Chaykin	Drama	
Perfect Pie	Barbara Willis Sweete	Wendy Crewson, Barbara Williams, Tom McCamus, Alison Pill, Rachel McAdams	Drama	Script and play by Judith Thompson; Genie Award – Cinematography
Pirouette	Tali Prévost		Animated short	
Prisoner of Paradise	Malcolm Clarke & Stuart Sender		Documentary	Canada-U.K.-Germany; Academy Award nominee; made with U.S. financing
Punch	Guy Bennett	Michael Riley, Sonja Bennett, Meredith McGeachie	Dark comedy	
Québec-Montréal	Ricardo Trogi	Patrice Robitaille, Jean-Phillipe Pearson, Stéphane Breton, François Létourneau, Isabelle Blais, Julie Le Breton	Comedy	
The Ring Within (Le Ring intérieur)	Dan Bigras		Documentary	
Saint Monica	Terrance Odette	Genevieve Buechner, Brigitte Bako	Drama	
Savage Messiah	Mario Azzopardi	Luc Picard, Polly Walker, Isabelle Blais, Isabelle Cyr, Julie La Rochelle, Pascale Montpetit	Drama	
Séraphin: Heart of Stone (Séraphin: un homme et son péché)	Charles Binamé	Pierre Lebeau, Karine Vanasse, Roy Dupuis, Rémy Girard, Bidou Laloge, Julien Poulin, Louise Portal	Drama	A remake of the 1950 film.
Spider	David Cronenberg	Ralph Fiennes, Gabriel Byrne, Miranda Richardson, Lynn Redgrave	Drama	Script and novel by Patrick McGrath, it was entered into the 2002 Cannes Film Festival.
Spirit: Stallion of the Cimarron	Kelly Asbury, Lorna Cook	Matt Damon, James Cromwell, Daniel Studi	Animated western	
Steal	Gérard Pirès	Stephen Dorff, Natasha Henstridge	Action	Canada-U.K.-France co-production
The Stone of Folly	Jesse Rosensweet		Animated short	Cannes Film Festival – Jury Prize for Animation
Strange Invaders	Cordell Barker		National Film Board animated short	Academy Award nominee
Tom	Mike Hoolboom	Tom Chomont	Documentary	
Touch & Go	Scott Simpson	Jeff Douglas, Patricia Zentilli, Stephen Sharkey, Elliot Page	Comedy	
The True Meaning of Pictures: Shelby Lee Adams' Appalachia	Jennifer Baichwal	Shelby Lee Adams	Documentary	
Various Positions	Ori Kowarsky	Tygh Runyan, Carly Pope	Drama	
Virginia's Run	Peter Markle	Gabriel Byrne, Joanne Whalley, Lindze Letherman, Kevin Zegers	Family film	Made with U.S. financing
War Babies	Raymonde Provencher		Documentary	
Why Don't You Dance?	Michael Downing	Kenneth Mitchell, Deborah Pollitt, Bill McDonald	Short drama	
The Wild Dogs	Thom Fitzgerald	Thom Fitzgerald, Alberta Watson, David Hayman	Drama	
Yellowknife	Rodrigue Jean	Sébastien Huberdeau, Hélène Florent, Patsy Gallant	Drama	

== See also ==
- 2002 in Canada
- 2002 in Canadian television
