= 2002 Toronto International Film Festival =

Annual Canadian film festival

- Festival poster
- Opening film: Ararat
- Closing film: Femme Fatale
- Location: Toronto, Ontario, Canada
- Hosted by: Toronto International Film Festival Group
- No. of films: 343 films
- Festival date: September 5, 2002–September 17, 2002
- Language: English
- Website: tiff.net
- 2003 2001

The 27th Toronto International Film Festival ran from September 5 to September 17 and screened 343 films from 50 countries. Of these 263 were feature films, of which 141 were in a language other than English. The ten-day festival opened with Atom Egoyan's Ararat and closed with Brian De Palma's Femme Fatale.

== Awards ==
| Award | Film | Director |
|---|---|---|
| People's Choice Award | Whale Rider | Niki Caro |
| Discovery Award | The Magdalene Sisters | Peter Mullan |
| Visions Award | Russian Ark | Aleksandr Sokurov |
| Visions Award - Special Citation | City of God | Fernando Meirelles |
| Visions Award - Special Citation | Gerry | Gus Van Sant |
| Best Canadian Feature Film | Spider | David Cronenberg |
| Best Canadian First Feature Film | Marion Bridge | Wiebke von Carolsfeld |
| Best Canadian Short Film | Blue Skies | Ann Marie Fleming |
| FIPRESCI International Critics' Award | Under Another Sky (Les chemins de l'oued) | Gaël Morel |
| FIPRESCI International Critics' Award - Special Mention | Open Hearts | Susanne Bier |

== Programme ==
=== Gala Presentations ===
- 11'9"01 September 11 by Youssef Chahine, Amos Gitai, Shōhei Imamura, Alejandro González Iñárritu, Claude Lelouch, Ken Loach, Samira Makhmalbaf, Mira Nair, Idrissa Ouedraogo, Sean Penn and Danis Tanović
- Antwone Fisher by Denzel Washington
- Ararat by Atom Egoyan
- Chihwaseon by Im Kwon-taek
- Far From Heaven by Todd Haynes
- Femme Fatale by Brian De Palma
- The Four Feathers by Shekhar Kapur
- Frida by Julie Taymor
- The Good Thief by Neil Jordan
- The Guys by Jim Simpson
- L'homme du train by Patrice Leconte
- In America by Jim Sheridan
- Jet Lag by Danièle Thompson
- Moonlight Mile by Brad Silberling
- The Other Side of the Bed by Emilio Martínez Lázaro
- Phone Booth by Joel Schumacher
- Spider by David Cronenberg
- White Oleander by Peter Kosminsky

=== Masters ===
- 10 by Abbas Kiarostami
- All or Nothing by Mike Leigh
- La Dernière Lettre by Frederick Wiseman
- Dirty Pretty Things by Stephen Frears
- The Man Without a Past by Aki Kaurismäki
- My Mother's Smile by Marco Bellocchio
- A Peck on the Cheek by Mani Ratnam
- Sex Is Comedy by Catherine Breillat
- Shadow Kill by Adoor Gopalakrishnan
- Sweet Sixteen by Ken Loach
- A Tale Of A Naughty Girl by Buddhadev Dasgupta
- Ten Minutes Older: The Cello by Bernardo Bertolucci, Claire Denis, Mike Figgis, Jean-Luc Godard, Jiří Menzel, Michael Radford, Volker Schlöndorff and István Szabó
- Together by Chen Kaige

=== Visions ===
- Blissfully Yours by Apichatpong Weerasethakul
- City Of God by Fernando Meirelles
- Dolls by Takeshi Kitano
- Le Fils by Jean-Pierre Dardenne and Luc Dardenne
- Gerry by Gus Van Sant
- Happy Here and Now by Michael Almereyda
- Irreversible by Gaspar Noé
- Japón by Carlos Reygadas
- Ken Park by Larry Clark and Edward Lachman
- Lilya 4-ever by Lukas Moodysson
- Morvern Callar by Lynne Ramsay
- Music for Weddings and Funerals by Unni Straume
- Novo by Jean-Pierre Limosin
- Personal Velocity by Rebecca Miller
- Public Toilet by Fruit Chan
- Russian Ark by Alexandr Sokurov
- A Snake of June by Shinya Tsukamoto
- Teknolust by Lynn Hershman Leeson
- La Trilogie: Après la vie by Lucas Belvaux
- La Trilogie: Cavale by Lucas Belvaux
- La Trilogie: Un couple épatant by Lucas Belvaux
- Vendredi soir by Claire Denis
- La Vie Nouvelle by Philippe Grandrieux
- A World Of Love by Aurelio Grimaldi

=== Special Presentations ===
- 8 Women by François Ozon
- 8 Mile by Curtis Hanson
- Adolphe by Benoît Jacquot
- Assassination Tango by Robert Duvall
- Auto Focus by Paul Schrader
- Between Strangers by Edoardo Ponti
- Bowling for Columbine by Michael Moore
- Chaos and Desire by Manon Briand
- City of Ghosts by Matt Dillon
- Dirty Deeds by David Caesar
- Divine Intervention by Elia Suleiman
- The Emperor's Club by Michael Hoffman
- Evelyn by Bruce Beresford
- Heaven by Tom Tykwer
- I've Heard the Mermaids Singing by Patricia Rozema
- Laurel Canyon by Lisa Cholodenko
- Max by Menno Meyjes
- Miyazaki's Spirited Away by Hayao Miyazaki
- Punch-Drunk Love by Paul Thomas Anderson
- The Quiet American by Phillip Noyce
- Rabbit-Proof Fence by Phillip Noyce
- The Secret Lives of Dentists by Alan Rudolph
- Shaolin Soccer by Stephen Chow
- Standing in the Shadows of Motown by Paul Justman
- Tso Chaplin Mutual Shorts: Easy Street; The Cure; The Adventurer by Charles Chaplin
- Talk to Her by Pedro Almodóvar
- Touching Wild Horses by Eleanore Lindo
- The Wild Thornberrys Movie by Jeff McGrath and Cathy Malkasian

=== Dialogues: Talking with Pictures ===
- Billy Jack by Tom Laughlin
- The Conversation by Francis Ford Coppola
- Days of Heaven by Terrence Malick
- Modern Times by Charles Chaplin
- Outcast of the Islands by Carol Reed
- Pickpocket by Robert Bresson

=== Discovery ===
- Bellissima by Artur Urbanski
- Chicken Poets by Meng Jinghui
- Les Diables by Christophe Ruggia
- The Exam by Nasser Refaie
- Hard Goodbyes: My Father by Penny Panayotopoulou
- Hukkle by Gyorgy Palfi
- The Last Great Wilderness by David Mackenzie
- Leo by Mehdi Norowzian
- Letters in the Wind by Ali Reza Amini
- The Magdalene Sisters by Peter Mullan
- Try Seventeen by Jeffrey Porter
- Whale Rider by Niki Caro
- Woman Of Water by Hidenori Sugimori
- Women's Prison by Manijeh Hekmat
- Blue by Hiroshi Ando

=== Real to Reel ===
- Atlantic Drift by Michel Daeron
- Blind Spot: Hitler's Secretary by André Heller and Othmar Schmiderer
- Cuban Rafters by Carles Bosch and Josep M. Domenech
- Cul De Sac: A Suburban War Story by Garrett Scott
- Elsewhere by Nikolaus Geyrhalter
- Family by Sami Saif and Phie Ambo
- Gabriel Orozco by Juan Carlos Martín
- Horns and Halos by Suki Hawley and Michael Galinsky
- Local Angel by Udi Aloni
- Lost in La Mancha by Keith Fulton and Louis Pepe
- My Name Was Sabina Spielrein by Elisabeth Marton
- The Nazi by Rod Lurie
- Neapolitan Heart by Paolo Santoni
- OT: Our Town by Scott Hamilton Kennedy
- Promise Land by Gili Dolev
- Railroad of Hope by Ning Ying
- Spellbound by Jeff Blitz
- Stevie by Steve James
- The Sweatbox by John-Paul Davidson and Trudie Styler
- This Winter by Zhong Hua
- The Trials of Henry Kissinger by Eugene Jarecki
- Winged Migration by Jacques Perrin
- Être et avoir by Nicolas Philibert

=== Midnight Madness ===
- Alive by Ryuhei Kitamura
- Bubba Ho-tep by Don Coscarelli
- Cabin Fever by Eli Roth
- The Eye by Oxide Pang and Danny Pang
- MC5: A True Testimonial by David C. Thomas
- My Little Eye by Marc Evans
- Spun by Jonas Åkerlund
- Volcano High by Kim Tae-Kyun

=== Wavelengths ===
- The Aperture Of Ghostings: Catherine Street; Creased Robe Smile; Elsa Kirk by Lewis Klahr
- The Art of Fugue by Takashi Ishida
- Bautismo by Casey Koehler
- Counterfeit Film by Brett Simon
- Daylight Moon by Lewis Klahr
- Endless Obsession by Glen Fogel
- Gestalt by Takashi Ishida
- Going Back Home by Louise Bourque
- Gossamer Conglomerate by Courtney Hoskins
- Imaginary Light by Andrew Noren
- Incense by Shiho Kano
- An Injury to One by Travis Wilkerson
- Looking at the Sea by Peter Hutton
- The Man We Want To Hang by Kenneth Anger
- Manual by Christoph Girardet and Matthias Müller
- Munkphilm by Courtney Hoskins
- National Archive: V.1 by Travis Wilkerson
- Puce Moment by Kenneth Anger
- Scratch by Christoph Girardet
- Self Portrait Post Mortem by Louise Bourque
- Swiss Trip by Oskar Fischinger
- Time Being by Andrew Noren
- Ultima Thule by Janie Geiser
- Very and Night Mulch by Stan Brakhage
- Wien & Mozart And Elvis by Jonas Mekas

=== Canadian Open Vault ===
- La vraie nature de Bernadette by Gilles Carle

=== Perspective Canada ===
- The Baroness and the Pig by Michael Mackenzie
- Blue Skies by Ann Marie Fleming
- Bollywood/Hollywood by Deepa Mehta
- Countdown by Nathan Morlando
- Culture by Donigan Cumming
- Deadend.Com by S. Wyeth Clarkson
- La Dernière voix by Julien Fonfrède and Karim Hussain
- Evelyn: The Cutest Evil Dead Girl by Brad Peyton
- FIX: The Story of an Addicted City by Nettie Wild
- Flower & Garnet by Keith Behrman
- Flux by Christopher Hinton
- Folk by Ryan Feldman
- Gambling, Gods and LSD by Peter Mettler
- Heatscore by Adam Brodie and Dave Derewlany
- Is the Crown at War with Us? by Alanis Obomsawin
- Islands by Richard Fung
- Lighthead by Daniel Sadler
- Little Dickie by Anita McGee
- Lonesome Joe by Mark Sawers
- Long Life, Happiness & Prosperity by Mina Shum
- Marion Bridge by Wiebke von Carolsfeld
- The Marsh by Kim Nguyen
- Moon in the Afternoon by Simon Davidson
- Die Mutter by Cliff Caines
- The Negro by Robert Morin
- Ocean by Catherine Martin
- Once Upon a Time on the Beach by Byron Lamarque
- Past Perfect by Daniel MacIvor
- Perfect Pie by Barbara Willis Sweete
- Prom Fight: The Marc Hall Story by Larry Peloso
- Punch by Guy Bennett
- Rondo pour trompette by Jean-Sebastien Baillat
- Les Rossy by Jennifer Alleyn
- Rub & Tug by Soo Lyu
- S.P.C.E. by Marc Bisaillon
- Saint Monica by Terrance Odette
- Saskatchewan by Brian Stockton
- Shadowy Encounters by Gariné Torossian
- Short Hymn, Silent War by Charles Officer
- Snooze by Stéphane Lafleur
- Song of the Firefly by Izabella Pruska-Oldenhof
- Spring Chickens by Matthew Holm
- The Stone of Folly by Jesse Rosensweet
- Straight in the Face by Peter Demas
- Tom by Mike Hoolboom
- The True Meaning of Pictures: Shelby Lee Adams' Appalachia by Jennifer Baichwal
- Why Don't You Dance? by Michael Downing
- The Wild Dogs by Thom Fitzgerald
- Yellowknife by Rodrigue Jean

=== Contemporary World Cinema ===
- 24 Hours in the Life of a Woman by Laurent Bouhnik
- Aiki by Daisuke Tengan
- Angela by Roberta Torre
- Autumn Spring by Vladimír Michálek
- BaadAsssss Cinema by Isaac Julien
- Bear's Kiss by Sergei Bodrov
- Bend It Like Beckham by Gurinder Chadha
- The Best of Times by Chang Tso-Chi
- Better Luck Tomorrow by Justin Lin
- Big Shot's Funeral by Feng Xiaogang
- Black and White by Craig Lahiff
- Blue Car by Karen Moncrieff
- Blue Gate Crossing by Yee Chin-yen
- El Bonaerense by Pablo Trapero
- The Crime of Father Amaro by Carlos Carrera
- Cry Woman by Liu Bingjian
- The Cuckoo by Aleksandr Rogozhkin
- Everyday God Kisses Us On The Mouth by Sinişa Dragin
- Falcons by Friðrik Þór Friðriksson
- Fuehrer Ex by Winfried Bonengel
- Gasoline by Monica Stambrini
- The Ghost Of F. Scott Fitzgerald by Charles Lyons
- The Heart of Me by Thaddeus O'Sullivan
- L'Idole by Samantha Lang
- Intacto by Juan Carlos Fresnadillo
- The Intended by Kristian Levring
- Julie Walking Home by Agnieszka Holland
- Kedma by Amos Gitai
- The Kite by Alexei Muradov
- Love Liza by Todd Louiso
- The Lover by Valeriy Todorovskiy
- A Lucky Day by Sandra Gugliotta
- Ma vraie vie à Rouen by Olivier Ducastel and Jacques Martineau
- Madame Satã by Karim Aïnouz
- Never Get Outta the Boat by Paul Quinn
- Nothing More by Juan Carlos Cremata Malberti
- Nowhere in Africa by Caroline Link
- The Nugget by Bill Bennett
- Once Upon a Time in the Midlands by Shane Meadows
- One Night the Moon by Rachel Perkins
- Open Hearts by Susanne Bier
- Une part du ciel by Benedicte Lienard
- Pleasant Days by Kornél Mundruczó
- Poniente by Chus Gutierrez
- Prayer by Jay Rosenblatt
- Pure by Gillies MacKinnon
- Raising Victor Vargas by Peter Sollett
- Real Women Have Curves by Patricia Cardoso
- Reno: Rebel Without A Pause by Nancy Savoca
- Respiro by Emanuele Crialese
- Roger Dodger by Dylan Kidd
- Rosa La China by Valeria Sarmiento
- The Sea by Baltasar Kormákur
- Secretary by Steven Shainberg
- Small Voices by Gil M. Portes
- The Space Between by Chad Lowe
- Springtime in a Small Town by Tian Zhuangzhuang
- Step on It by Sabine Derflinger
- Suddenly by Diego Lerman
- Sur Le Bout Des Doigts by Yves Angelo
- The Three Marias by Aluízio Abranches
- Ticket to Jerusalem by Rashid Masharawi
- A Transistor Love Story by Pen-Ek Ratanaruang
- Tuck Everlasting by Jay Russell
- Tycoon by Pavel Lounguine
- Unknown Pleasures by Jia Zhang-Ke
- The Voice Of The Prophet by Robert Edwards
- Warriors by Daniel Calparsoro
- Welcome to Collinwood by Anthony Russo and Joe Russo
- Wretched Lives by Joel Lamangan

=== Planet Africa ===
- Abouna by Mahamat Saleh Haroun
- Alexei and the Spring by Seiichi Motohashi
- Ataklan -- Naked Walk by Walt Lovelace
- Black Attack by Walt Lovelace
- G by Christopher Scott Cherot
- George and the Bicycle Pump by Asha Lovelace
- I Have a Dream by Zak Ove
- Khorma, Enfant Du Cimetiere by Jilani Saadi
- Mud Madness by Walt Lovelace
- Now Jimmy! by Mary Wells
- Promised Land by Jason Xenopoulos
- Rendez-Vous by Mariette Monpierre
- Royal Bonbon by Charles Najman
- Shottas by Cess Silvera
- A String of Pearls by Camille Billops and James V. Hatch
- Ubuntu's Wounds by Sechaba Morojele
- Under Another Sky (Les Chemins de l'oued) by Gaël Morel
- Waiting for Happiness by Abderrahmane Sissako

=== National Cinema Lineup - Harvest: South Korean Renaissance ===
- Bad Guy by Kim Ki-duk
- Camel(s) by Park Ki-yong
- Champion by Kwak Kyung-taek
- Desire by Kim Eung-su
- Oasis by Lee Chang-dong
- Sympathy for Mr. Vengeance by Park Chan-wook
- Take Care of My Cat by Jeong Jae-eun
- Too Young to Die by Park Jin-pyo
- Turning Gate by Hong Sang-soo
- The Way Home by Lee Jeong-hyang

=== Canadian Retrospective: Allan King ===
- Children In Conflict Episode: A Talk With Irene by Allan King
- Come On Children by Allan King
- The Dragon's Egg by Allan King
- Dreams by Allan King
- Epilogue by Allan King
- The Field Day by Allan King
- Interview with Orson Welles by Allan King
- Joshua, A Nigerian Portrait by Allan King
- Maria by Allan King
- A Married Couple by Allan King
- A Matter of Pride by Allan King
- Red Emma by Allan King and Martin Kinch
- Rickshaw by Allan King
- Running Away Backwards by Allan King
- Skidrow by Allan King
- Warrendale by Allan King
- Who Has Seen the Wind by Allan King
- Who's in Charge? by Sig Gerber

=== Spotlight: Robert Guédiguian ===
- Dernier Été by Robert Guédiguian and Frank Le Wita
- Dieu vomit les tièdes by Robert Guédiguian
- Marie-Jo et ses 2 amours by Robert Guédiguian
- Marius et Jeannette by Robert Guédiguian
- La ville est tranquille by Robert Guédiguian
- À l'attaque! by Robert Guédiguian
- À la Place du Coeur by Robert Guédiguian
- À la vie, à la mort! by Robert Guédiguian

=== Two Feet, One Angel: A Tribute to Ramiro Puerta ===
- Contradanza No. 2 by Ramiro Puerta
- Crucero/Crossroads by Ramiro Puerta
- The Lovers of the Arctic Circle by Julio Médem
- Strawberry and Chocolate by Tomás Gutiérrez Alea and Juan Carlos Tabío
- The Topic of Cancer by Ramiro Puerta
- Two Feet, One Angel by Ramiro Puerta
- Exxxorcisms by Jaime Humberto Hermosillo

== Canada's Top Ten ==
TIFF named its annual Canada's Top Ten list in early 2003.

- Ararat by Atom Egoyan
- Chaos and Desire by Manon Briand
- Dracula: Pages from a Virgin's Diary by Guy Maddin
- Flower & Garnet by Keith Behrman
- Gambling, Gods and LSD by Peter Mettler
- Marion Bridge by Wiebke von Carolsfeld
- The Negro by Robert Morin
- Ocean by Catherine Martin
- Spider by David Cronenberg
- Tom by Mike Hoolboom
