= Vancouver Film Critics Circle Awards 2002 =

Annual Canadian film awards ceremony

The 3rd Vancouver Film Critics Circle Awards, honoring the best in filmmaking in 2002, were given on 30 January 2003.

== Winners ==
=== International ===
- Best Actor:
  - Daniel Day-Lewis – Gangs of New York
- Best Actress:
  - Julianne Moore – Far from Heaven
- Best Director:
  - Stephen Daldry – The Hours
- Best Film:
  - The Hours
- Best Foreign Language Film:
  - Hable con ella (Talk to Her), Spain
- Best Supporting Actor:
  - Chris Cooper – Adaptation.
- Best Supporting Actress:
  - Toni Collette – The Hours

=== Canadian ===
- Best Actor:
  - Callum Keith Rennie – Flower & Garnet
- Best Actress:
  - Sonja Bennett – Punch
- Best Director:
  - Keith Behrman – Flower & Garnet
- Best Film:
  - Flower & Garnet
- Best Supporting Actor:
  - Benjamin Ratner – Looking for Leonard
- Best Supporting Actress:
  - Meredith McGeachie – Punch
