= Blue Skies (Irving Berlin song) =

1926 song by Irving Berlin

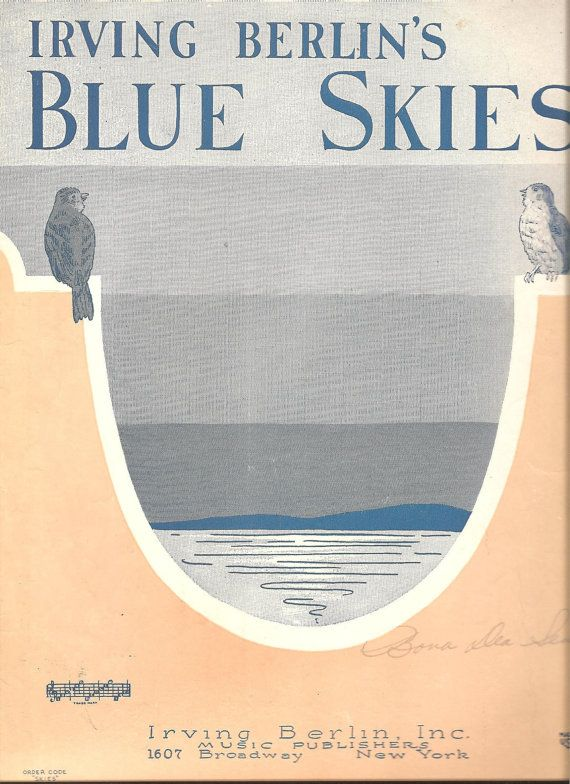
- Sheet music cover, 1926

Song
- Published: 1926 by Irving Berlin, Inc.
- Songwriter: Irving Berlin

"Blue Skies" is a popular song, written by Irving Berlin in 1926.

"Blue Skies" is one of many popular songs whose lyrics use a "bluebird of happiness" as a symbol of cheer: "Bluebirds singing a song/Nothing but bluebirds all day long." The sunny optimism of the lyrics is undercut by the minor key giving the words an ironic feeling.

== History ==
The song was composed in 1926 as a last-minute addition to the Rodgers and Hart musical Betsy. Although the show ran for only 39 performances, "Blue Skies" was an instant success, with audiences on opening night demanding 24 encores of the piece from star Belle Baker. During the final repetition, Baker forgot her lyrics, prompting Berlin to sing them from his seat in the front row.

In 1927, the music was published and Ben Selvin's recorded version (as The Knickerbockers with vocals by Charles Kaley) was a hit. That same year, it became one of the first songs to be featured in a talkie, when Al Jolson performed it in The Jazz Singer. The song was recorded for all of the major and dime store labels of the time. A version was recorded by Benny Goodman and his Orchestra in 1935 (Victor 25136). 1946 was also a notable year for the song, with a Bing Crosby/Fred Astaire film taking its title along with two recorded versions by Count Basie and Benny Goodman reaching #8 and #9 on the pop charts, respectively.

In 1958, Ella Fitzgerald crossed genres putting her own distinctive scat jazz stylings on "Blue Skies" for her double-LP album, Ella Fitzgerald Sings the Irving Berlin Song Book, that year's installment in her famous eight-album Song Book series. The track was also included in that year's Ella compilation album, Get Happy!. In 1962 the song was released as a single by Johnny Rivers. In 1992, Al Jarreau recorded a version for the film adaptation of Glengarry Glen Ross.

The song was featured in Ann Marie Fleming's 2002 short film Blue Skies, performed by Alessandro Juliani.

== Lyrics ==
I was blue, just as blue as I could be
Ev'ry day was a cloudy day for me
Then good luck came a-knocking at my door
Skies were gray but they're not gray anymore

Blue skies, smilin' at me
Nothin' but blue skies do I see

Bluebirds singing a song
Nothin' but bluebirds all day long

Never saw the sun shinin' so bright
Never saw things lookin' so right
Noticin' the days hurryin' by
When you're in love, my how they fly

Blue days, all of them gone
Nothin' but blue skies from now on

Never saw the sun shinin' so bright
Never saw things lookin' so right
Noticin' the days hurryin' by
When you're in love, oh how they fly

Blue days, all of them gone
Nothin' but blue skies from now on

== Willie Nelson version ==
"Blue Skies"

Single by Willie Nelson

from the album Stardust
- B-side: "Moonlight in Vermont"
- Released: July 1978 (U.S.)
- Genre: Country
- Length: 3:32
- Label: Columbia
- Songwriter: Irving Berlin
- Producer: Booker T. Jones

Willie Nelson singles chronology
"Georgia on My Mind" (1978)	"Blue Skies" (1978)	"All of Me" (1978)

Twenty years after Fitzgerald's cover, in 1978, Willie Nelson released another version of "Blue Skies", which became a #1 country music hit. This version harkened back to 1939, when it was a major western swing and country standard, performed by Moon Mullican.

=== Chart performance ===
Chart (1978)	Peak position
US Hot Country Songs (Billboard)	1
US Adult Contemporary (Billboard)	32
Australian (Kent Music Report)	53
Canadian RPM Country Tracks	1
Canadian RPM Adult Contemporary Tracks	4
New Zealand Singles Chart	26

== See also ==
- List of 1920s jazz standards
