= We Happy Few (disambiguation) =

We Happy Few is a video game by Compulsion Games.

We Happy Few may also refer to:

- "We few, we happy few, we band of brothers", a line from the St Crispin's Day Speech in Shakespeare's play Henry V
- We Happy Few (play), a 2004 play by Imogen Stubbs
- "We Happy Few" (Supernatural), an episode of the TV series Supernatural
