= Letters in the Wind =

Letters in the Wind may refer to:

- Letters in the Wind (film), a 2002 Iranian film
- Letters in the Wind (2003 film), an Italian film produced by Donatella Palermo
- Letters in the Wind, a 2001 Israeli documentary by Ram Loevy
