= Under Another Sky =

2002 film

- French: Les Chemins de l'oued
- Directed by: Gaël Morel
- Written by: Gaël Morel
- Produced by: Christian Charret; Sandra d'Aboville
- Starring: Nicolas Cazalé; Mohamed Majd; Kheireddine Defdaf; Amira Casar
- Cinematography: Jean-Max Bernard
- Edited by: Catherine Schwartz
- Music by: Jérôme Coullet
- Production companies: Arte France Cinéma; Gétévé Productions
- Distributed by: Pierre Grise Distribution
- Release date: 11 September 2002 (TIFF)
- Running time: 78 minutes
- Country: France
- Languages: French; Arabic

Under Another Sky (French: Les Chemins de l'oued, lit. "The Ways of the Valley") is a French drama film, directed by Gaël Morel and released in 2002. The film stars Nicolas Cazalé as Sami, a young French man of Algerian descent who accidentally kills a police officer in a car accident; sent by his family to live with his grandfather (Mohamed Majd) in Algeria for his protection, he struggles to adapt to his new and unfamiliar environment, and is torn between the influence of his cousins Issam (Kheireddine Defdaf), a drug dealer in Algiers, and Nadia (Amira Casar), a social worker who works to help young victims of violence.

The cast also includes Hamza Bennani, Kaoutar Mohamadi, Mohamed Said Arif, Clément Deva, Nabil Tahar, Amina Medjoubi, Mathieu Casado, Paul Morel and Akrame El Meziane.

The film was the winner of the FIPRESCI Prize at the 2002 Toronto International Film Festival.
