= Window Horses =

Window Horses: The Poetic Persian Epiphany of Rosie Ming
- Film poster
- Directed by: Ann Marie Fleming
- Written by: Ann Marie Fleming
- Based on: Window Horses: The Poetic Epiphany of Rosie Ming by Ann Marie Fleming
- Produced by: Shirley Vercruysse; Sandra Oh; Ann Marie Fleming; Michael Fukushima
- Starring: Sandra Oh; Nancy Kwan; Shohreh Aghdashloo
- Edited by: Ileana Pietrobruno
- Music by: Taymaz Saba
- Production companies: Stickgirl Productions; National Film Board Of Canada
- Distributed by: Mongrel Media
- Release date: June 13, 2016 (Annecy)
- Running time: 89 minutes
- Country: Canada
- Languages: English; Persian; Mandarin Chinese; Cantonese

Window Horses: The Poetic Persian Epiphany of Rosie Ming is a 2016 Canadian animated film written and directed by Ann Marie Fleming (sometimes stylized with the title in parentheses or written as Window Horses without a subtitle), and a graphic novel by Fleming, Window Horses: The Poetic Epiphany of Rosie Ming.

Funding for the film was raised through an Indiegogo campaign, which amassed more than $80,000 in 50 days, from 730 contributors in 28 countries. The film was co-produced by Fleming's Stickgirl Productions, Sandra Oh and the National Film Board of Canada.

== Plot ==
Rosie Ming lives in Vancouver with Gloria and Stephen, her maternal grandparents who are of Chinese descent. Rosie's mother Caroline died in a car accident when Rosie was a child. An aspiring poet with a fixation on Paris, France, Rosie collects her poems in a book which she self-publishes. The book gets the attention of the organizers of a poetry festival in Shiraz, Iran. Though Gloria is adamantly opposed to Rosie going to Iran, she eventually relents after seeing Rosie's determination. Her grandparents pack a black chador for Rosie to wear in Iran, though Rosie soon finds many festival guests are confused by her appearance as Rosie is not a devout Muslim and women in Iran are not required by law to wear chadors.

Among the poets, Rosie meets at the festival are festival cultural ambassador Mehrnaz, Chinese poet Di Di, and German poet Dietmar. At a competition early in the festival, Rosie performs one of her poems by singing it, but is scored poorly by the judges as she was unaware that a woman singing in public is considered provocative in Iran. Mehrnaz remains supportive, later on bringing Rosie to the tomb of famous Shiraz poet Hafez for inspiration. In contrast, Dietmar is relentlessly disdainful of Rosie's poetic style and hangup for Paris. However, Dietmar's satirical poem about wealthy Europeans feeding expensive food to their dogs at the dinner table is badly received, not realizing until after his performance the local audience found the premise of dogs eating at the table alongside humans to be deeply offensive. Rosie calms a panicked Dietmar with the idea of a slam, wherein both poets improvise a poem together. Their improvisation goes over well with their audience, and Dietmar reconciles with Rosie.

A traditional consultation with the poems of Hafez leads Mehmaz to assign Rosie the task of translating one of Di Di's poems to English for her to perform at the end of the festival. As Rosie talks to Di Di, she learns that Di Di is a political exile who was in the United Kingdom at the time of the Beijing massacre and has refused to return to China. Seeing Rosie feels discouraged that her own poetry lacks depth, Di Di tells Rosie to make his poem into her own as she translates it.

Early in the festival, Rosie reveals that her father Mehran was Iranian; she claims he abandoned her family when she was seven. As her visit in Iran goes on, she discovers more about her father from his friends and family. Rosie learns that Mehran came from a prominent family in Shiraz and originally trained in the United States to be a fighter pilot in the Iranian Air Force during the Shah's reign. When the Iranian Revolution occurred, Mehran's ties to the Shah led to his being forced out of the Air Force; he became a teacher of poetry and literature instead. However, the government reinstated him when they needed pilots for the Iran–Iraq War. As the war dragged on, Mehran grew so disillusioned that he deserted the Air Force, fleeing to Turkey, where he met Caroline. The couple married and settled in Canada. Despite the risks involved, Mehran decided to return to Iran to see his dying mother, only to be arrested upon arrival and have his passport revoked. Deeply upset after his departure, Caroline drove carelessly, resulting in a fatal car accident. When Mehran was finally released, he asked for Rosie to be sent to live with him in Iran. Grief-stricken from the loss of Caroline, Rosie's grandparents refused, moving to Vancouver and cutting off all contact with Mehran, and lying to Rosie that her father abandoned her.

Near the time of her presentation, Rosie learns that Mehran is in the hospital with pneumonia. By the time Rosie reaches the hospital, Mehran has already checked out, but she is given her father's home address by one of his friends, a doctor at the hospital. Rosie meets her relatives from her father's side, who welcome her into the family and show her all the letters that Mehran wrote to her but that her grandparents had returned. When Rosie learns that her father is responsible for inviting her to Iran and is waiting for her at the festival, Rosie's relatives replace her chador with a head scarf and a more casual outfit and rush to the presentation. As she recites her version of Di Di's poem, Mehran appears in the audience and finally reunites with his daughter.

== Creation ==
Multiple artists participated to the content of the film in order for the poetry, songs, and visual styles to blend a vast number of cultural styles, with multiple animation styles created with the same goal. Window Horses' lead animator and designer is Kevin Langdale.

=== Guest Director-Animators ===
- Rosie's poem – Janet Perlman
- History of Iran – Sadaf Amini
- Hafiz history – Bahram Javaheri
- Bani Adaam – Dominique Doktor, Shira Avni (consultant)
- Taylor Mali's poem – Elissa Chee
- Dietmar's Poem – Michael Mann
- Hafiz poem – Jody Kramer
- Cow poem – Kunal Sen
- Masnevi – Louise Johnson
- Rumi poem – Lillian Chan

=== Poets ===
- "I need to know..." by Ann Marie Fleming
- "Cow Poem" by Ann Marie Fleming
- "Horse" by Ann Marie Fleming
- "Mah" by Sean Yangzhan
- "Bani Adaam" by Abu-Muhammad Muslih al-Din bin Abdallah Shirazi (Saadi), English adaptation by Ann Marie Fleming
- "We Should Talk About This Problem" by Daniel Ladinsky
- "The Moon Exactly How it is Tonight" by Taylor Mali
- "Masnevi" by Mowlana Jalal-e-Din Mohammad Molavi Rumi (Rumi)
- "do you know what this lute music tells you?" by Mowlana Jalal-e-Din Mohammad Molavi Rumi (Rumi)
- "Now that I am with you" by Mowlana Jalal-e-Din Mohammad Molavi Rumi (Rumi)

== Cast ==
- Sandra Oh as Rosie
- Nancy Kwan as Gloria
- Shohreh Aghdashloo as Mehrnaz
- Camyar Chaichian as Cyrus
- Navid Negahban as Mehran
- Omid Abtahi as Ramin
- Elliot Page as Kelly (Note: Credited as Ellen Page; Page came out as transgender and changed his name in 2020.)
- Don McKellar as Dietmar
- Kristen Thomson as Caroline
- Jun (James) Zhu as Di Di
- Panta Mosleh as Shahrzad
- Eddy Ko as Stephen
- Peyman Moaadi as Payman

== Release ==
The film had its world premiere in competition at the 2016 Annecy International Animated Film Festival, followed by its North American premiere at the 2016 Toronto International Film Festival.

=== Awards ===
In October 2016, Window Horses received the Best BC Film Award and Best Canadian Film Award at the Vancouver International Film Festival's BC Spotlight Gala, as well as the Jury Prize at the Bucheon International Animation Festival. In November, it received the Centennial Best Canadian Film or Video Award at the Toronto Reel Asian International Film Festival. On December 7, 2016, the film was named to the Toronto International Film Festival's annual Canada's Top 10 list. Window Horses was presented with Audience Award at the 2016 Animasyros-International Animation Festival, and was named Best Picture by the Canadian Association of Online Film Critics. Most recently Window Horses was presented with the Human Rights Award at the 2017 RiverRun International Film Festival and Best Animated Feature Film at the 2017 Asia Pacific Screen Awards.
