= Control Alt Delete (film) =

- Directed by: Cameron Labine
- Written by: Cameron Labine
- Produced by: Lynne Stopkewich; Stephanie Symns
- Starring: Tyler Labine; Sonja Bennett; Geoff Gustafson; Keith Dallas; Alisen Down; Laura Bertram
- Cinematography: James Liston
- Edited by: Julian Clarke
- Music by: Tygh Runyan
- Production company: Hard Drive Films
- Distributed by: Entertainment One
- Release date: 2008
- Running time: 93 minutes
- Country: Canada
- Languages: English; French

Control Alt Delete is a 2008 Canadian comedy film written and directed by Cameron Labine, starring his brother, Tyler Labine. The film premiered at the 2008 Toronto International Film Festival, where Maximum bought the worldwide distribution rights to the film.

== Plot ==
The film is set in an information technology firm just before the year 2000. Lead programmer Lewis Henderson is in charge of solving various Y2K bugs, but finds himself increasingly distracted by his computer-mediated sexual yearnings. At first, Lewis is simply attracted to Internet pornography, but, after he is abandoned by his girlfriend, he takes an interest in having sex with the computer itself. As New Year's Day, 2000 approaches, Henderson's work and romantic issues intensify; the movie follows the protagonist as he tries to resolve both the Y2K problem and his own personal issues.

== Cast ==
- Tyler Labine as Lewis
- Sonja Bennett as Jane
- Geoff Gustafson as Gustafson
- Keith Dallas as Keith
- Alisen Down as Angela
- Laura Bertram as Sarah
- Kevin Kruchkywich as Anderson
- Bro Gilbert as Paulson
- Jonathon Young as Sanderson
- Carrie Ruscheinsky as Ali
