= Patricia Zentilli =

Canadian actress

- Other name: Patty Zentilli
- Years active: 1999–present

Patricia Zentilli is a Canadian performer who has worked in film, television and theatre across Canada and is best known for portraying Bunny in Lexx.

== Early life and education ==
Patricia's first formal training as an actor was to study clowning at The Dmitri Theatre School in Verscio, Switzerland. After graduating from high school, Patricia lived in Togo as part of a Canada World Youth programme.

Upon her return to Canada, Patricia earned a B.A. in theatre at Dalhousie University in Halifax and then did further studies with "Shakespeare and Company" in Bennington, Vermont.

== Career ==
=== Stage ===
Coming home to Nova Scotia, Patricia was cast in a number of productions with Neptune Theatre in roles that included "Shy Girl" in Sincerely, A Friend, "Frankie" in The Member of the Wedding with Jackie Richardson "Marty" in Grease, "Ophelia" in Hamlet, "Geraldine" in What the Butler Saw and "Curley's Wife" in Of Mice and Men. Patricia made her Canadian Stage Company (Toronto) debut playing the role of "Little Becky Two Shoes" in their production of Urinetown. In 2005, she starred as "Cathy" in Jason Robert Brown's The Last Five Years at the Manitoba Theatre Centre (Winnipeg) opposite Adam Brazier.

In November 2007, Patricia was invited back by CanStage to star in their production of Little Shop of Horrors. Ron Pederson played "Seymour", and Ted Dykstra directed. Patricia's portrayal of "Audrey", the bruised flower shop girl with a heart of gold, garnered numerous accolades from esteemed theatre critics across Toronto as well as a nomination for a 2007-2008 Dora Mavor Moore Award. Patricia returned to Nova Scotia to play "Brooke"/"Vicki" in the Atlantic Theatre Festival's production of Noises Off, for which she won the 2007 Robert Merritt Award for Outstanding Supporting Actress.

=== TV and film ===
In 1999 Patricia landed a principal role in the successful Canadian film New Waterford Girl, which went on to win awards at the Toronto International Film Festival. Around the same time, Patricia landed a recurring role as Bunny on the cult sci-fi television series Lexx, for which she still has a loyal fan following.

Patricia has made numerous guest appearances on television series that include The Chris Isaak Show, The Sean Cullen Show, Angela's Eyes, Naked Josh, This is Wonderland, Wonderfalls, Blue Murder, The Gavin Crawford Show, Made in Canada and The Rick Mercer Report. In 2003 she played "Lynn" in Scott Simpson and Michael Melski's film Touch & Go In 2006/2007 Patricia was seen once again on television as "Susan" in Global's The Jane Show, a television series that was co-written, produced and starred Teresa Pavlinek.

=== Music ===
Patricia performs as a singer and cabaret artist and has sung jazz, cabaret, folk and musical theatre in venues in both Toronto, Edmonton and Halifax.

== Personal life ==
She has one child, her daughter, Melody Marcos Timoteo, was born in October 2010.

== Partial filmography ==
=== Film ===
Year	Title	Role	Notes
1999	New Waterford Girl	Patty	
2002	Touch & Go	Lynn	
2018	#Roxy	Gail Nollen	

=== TV ===
Year	Title	Role	Notes
1999–2002	Lexx	Bunny Priest	17 episodes
2000	Songs in Ordinary Time	Bernadette Mansaw	TV movie
2000	Earth: Final Conflict	Eva Gale	1 episode
2000	Catch a Falling Star	Allison Hampton	TV movie
2001	A Nero Wolfe Mystery	Faith Usher	2 episodes
2002	Beyond Belief: Fact or Fiction	Lauren	1 episode
2002–2003	Street Time	Bonnie Abrams	3 episodes
2003–2004	Blue Murder	Bonnie Urquhart	3 episodes
2006–2007	The Jane Show	Susan	26 episodes
