= The Jane Show =

Canadian television sitcom

- The Jane Show logo
- Created by: Teresa Pavlinek; Ralph Chapman
- Starring: Teresa Pavlinek; Kate Trotter; Andrew Misle; Hardee T. Lineham; Patricia Zentilli; Darren Boyd
- Opening theme: variation of "Better" by Steve Eggers
- Composer: Blair Packham
- Country of origin: Canada
- Original language: English
- No. of seasons: 2
- No. of episodes: 27 + behind the scenes special

Production
- Running time: 23 minutes
- Production company: Shaftesbury Films

Original release
- Network: Global
- Release: 15 December 2004 – 2 May 2007

The Jane Show is a Canadian television sitcom produced by Shaftesbury Films that was shown on Global from 2006 to 2007. The series stars Teresa Pavlinek as Jane Black, an aspiring novelist who takes a corporate job after her life undergoes a major upheaval.

Pavlinek was also a co-creator, producer and writer for the series, alongside Ralph Chapman.

The show's cast also included Patricia Zentilli, Darren Boyd, Kate Trotter, Hardee T. Lineham, Nigel Shawn Williams and Andrew Misle.

Global originally aired the series pilot in December 2004, but retooled and redeveloped the program before ordering more episodes, which aired in 2006. The second season aired in 2007. The show was officially cancelled by Global on June 28, 2007.

== Awards ==
In 2007, both Ralph Chapman and Teresa Pavlinek were nominated for WGC awards for the episodes "Should Have Said" and "All About Steve", respectively.

== Episodes ==
- episode 0 "Pilot" 15 December 2004

=== Season 1 ===
1. The End Is the Beginning 1 June 2006
2. Let the Games Begin 6 June 2006
3. Jane's Addiction 20 June 2006
4. Ode to Marian 22 June 2006
5. Daddy's Home 29 June 2006
6. Tasting 5 July 2006
7. Thursday Night Rules 13 July 2006
8. Close Friends 20 July 2006
9. Should Have Said 27 July 2006
10. Strictly Jane aired 3 August 2006
11. All About Steve 10 August 2006
12. Rules of Engagement 17 August 2006
13. Evaluating Jane 24 August 2006

=== Season 2 ===
1. episode 14 Movin' on Up
2. episode 15 Blog Like Me 2 February 2007
3. episode 16 A Jane in the Crowd
4. episode 17 Shower Killer (featuring Anna Silk as Kathy)
5. episode 18: title of episode 5 unknown
6. episode 19 The House of Jane 14 March 2007
7. episode 20 Voices from the Past 15 January 2007
8. episode 21 The United Nations of Jane 22 February 2007
9. episode 22 Plastic Ono Jane
10. episode 23 The Chosen One 4 April 2007
11. episode 24 Walton Returns 11 April 2007
12. episode 25 It's All Relative 18 April 2007
13. episode 26 Till Beth Do Us Part 25 April 2007
14. episode 27 Who's Got Spirit? 6 May 2007
