= Confessions of a Sociopathic Social Climber =

2005 television film by Dana Lustig

- Promotional poster
- Based on: Confessions of a Sociopathic Social Climber by Adèle Lang
- Teleplay by: Eric Charmelo; Nicole Snyder
- Directed by: Dana Lustig
- Starring: Jennifer Love Hewitt; Colin Ferguson; James Kirk; Dan Roebuck; Sonja Bennett; Joey Lawrence
- Music by: Phil Marshall
- Country of origin: United States
- Original language: English

Production
- Producer: Evan Tylor
- Cinematography: Luc Montpellier
- Editor: Richard Schwadel
- Running time: 96 minutes
- Production companies: Once Upon a Time Films; Nomadic Pictures; Evolution Pictures

Original release
- Network: Oxygen
- Release: March 12, 2005

Confessions of a Sociopathic Social Climber (also known as The Social Climber) is a 2005 American romantic comedy television film directed by Dana Lustig, based on the 1998 novel of the same name by Adèle Lang. It premiered on Oxygen on March 12, 2005, and stars Jennifer Love Hewitt as 28-year-old Katya, an advertising executive more concerned with being a well-known socialite than being a good person. It co-stars Colin Ferguson, James Kirk, Dan Roebuck, Sonja Bennett, and Joey Lawrence.

== Plot ==
Katya Livingston is an ad exec living in San Francisco. Her accountant goes to prison and advises her to keep a journal of all of her expenses as she is sure to be audited. Katya is vain and selfish, trying to keep up with society by wearing designer knock offs and trying to get into all of the hottest clubs. She is best friends with Eliza: a well meaning do-gooder, Ferguson: a gay male escort with self-esteem issues and a long list of ex-boyfriends, and Frangiapani: a woman that has been married several times.

Katya finds out about the Royal Ball, a benefit for Youth Aid International and the biggest social event of the season. It will be thrown by socialite sisters Dove and Fawn Greenstein. She finds out that she has not been invited because of an indiscretion she mistakenly had with Dove Greenstein's husband on their wedding day and then later revealed Dove's real age to a local tabloid. She is desperate to go, especially when she finds out all of her friends are going.

== Cast ==
- Jennifer Love Hewitt as Katy "Katya" Livingston
- Colin Ferguson as Charles "Chuck" Fitz
- Joey Lawrence as Ferguson "Ferg" Smith
- Natassia Malthe as Frangiapani "Fran" Lee
- Daniel Roebuck as Alex "Lion" Krosgrov
- James Kirk as Sebastian
- Sonja Bennett as Eliza
- Stefanie Von Pfetten as Dove Greenstein
- Jennifer Clement as Gatekeeper
- David Lewis as Stan
- David Richmond-Peck as Teddy
- Meshach Peters as Sabelo
- Preston Cook as Bob
- Mike Viala as Steve
- Zak Santiago as Geoffrey

== Production ==
The film was shot on Vancouver Island, despite being set in San Francisco.

== Reception ==
CineMagazine rated the film 2 stars.
