= Fall (2014 film) =

- Directed by: Terrance Odette
- Written by: Terrance Odette
- Produced by: Mehernaz Lentin
- Starring: Michael Murphy; Wendy Crewson; Suzanne Clément; Katie Boland
- Cinematography: Norayr Kasper
- Edited by: Caroline Christie
- Music by: Nick Storring
- Production company: Lentin Odette Productions
- Distributed by: Mongrel Media
- Release date: October 3, 2014 (VIFF)
- Running time: 82 minutes
- Country: Canada
- Language: English

Fall is a 2014 Canadian drama film. Written and directed by Terrance Odette, the film stars Michael Murphy as Father Sam, a Roman Catholic priest who receives a letter asking about a sexual abuse incident he participated in 40 years earlier. The film was inspired by a past encounter of Odette when he was 14, but is not a direct portrayal of his childhood.

The film's cast also includes Wendy Crewson, Suzanne Clément, Katie Boland, Linda Kash and Joel Bissonnette.

== Plot ==
The film follows the mundane life of Father Sam, who tends to his small Niagara Falls parish. He appears to simply be wearily going through the motions of his life routine.

Father Sam's life is forced into descent when he receives a letter from a man named Christopher, now on his death bed, who Father Sam had mentored 40 years ago. The letter alludes to an incident when Father Sam shared a bed with Christopher when he was 14 years old, and asks whether anything inappropriate had occurred.

This leads Father Sam to embark on a roadtrip to Northern Ontario where he visits his mother and sister, and then to confront Christopher's widow Catherine. She bitterly accuses him of having sexually molested her late husband. Father Sam denies the accusation, but it is apparent that not even he is exactly sure about what happened 40 years ago during that night.

== Cast ==
- Michael Murphy as Father Sam
- Wendy Crewson as Sheila
- Suzanne Clément as Catherine
- Katie Boland as Chelsea
- Linda Kash as Marcie
- Joel Bissonnette as Michael
- Cas Anvar as Reza

== Critical response ==
Reviews of the film are mixed. On Rotten Tomatoes the film has only 5 critical reviews. In their comments, some critics view the film as "quietly haunting and effective". Others like Gary Goldstein state that "Murphy’s quietly precise performance ultimately can’t overcome the film’s chilly gravity and unsatisfying finale". Liam Lacey of The Globe and Mail says the film has a promising premise but the "follow through is solemn to the point of dullness". Similarly, The Hollywood Reporter states "The Bottom Line: Veteran character actor Michael Murphy delivers a quietly mesmerizing performance in this frustratingly static drama". However, Joe Leydon at Variety wrote that the film had "the overall ambiance of stark, stripped-to-essentials emotional and aesthetic rawness that might have made Robert Bresson proud".

== Awards ==
The film garnered five Canadian Screen Award nominations at the 3rd Canadian Screen Awards, including Best Picture, Best Actor (Murphy), Best Art Direction/Production Design (William Layton), Best Cinematography (Norayr Kasper) and Best Sound Editing (Elma Bello).

Odette was nominated for the Directors Guild of Canada's DGC Award for Best Direction in a Feature Film in 2015.
