= I Am Canadian =

Canadian beer slogan

I Am Canadian was the slogan of Molson Canadian beer from 1994 until 1999 (via ad agencies Maclaren Lintas, then MacLaren McCann), and between 2000 and 2005 (by Bensimon Byrne). It was also the subject of a popular ad campaign centred on Canadian patriotism and nationalism, the most famous examples of which are "The Rant" and "The Anthem". The ads aired in both English Canada and the United States. In 2005, shortly after Molson's merger with American brewer Coors, it announced it was retiring the "I Am Canadian" campaign. In 2017, Molson's "red beer fridge" ad, created in 2013 for its "I Am Canadian" campaign, had a resurgence in social media in response to the United States Trump travel ban.

In 2025, "The Rant" ad created in 2000 experienced a resurgence in social media as Canadian patriotism heightened during the trade war with the United States. In March 2025, a new updated version of the commercial, directly addressing the trade war and Donald Trump's threats to annex Canada as the 51st state of the United States, was released to YouTube.

== "The Rant" ==
In March 2000, using nationalism as a platform, the ad starred a man named Joe: an average Canadian, standing in a movie theatre, with a cinema screen behind him showing different images relating to Canadian culture. Joe proceeds to give a speech about what is it to be a Canadian and what it is not to be a Canadian, making particular efforts to distinguish himself both from common Canadian stereotypes of Americans ("I believe in peacekeeping, not policing") and common American stereotypes of Canadians ("I don't live in an igloo," "I say 'about,' not 'aboot'") and noting the beaver, the national animal of Canada ("is a proud and Noble animal").

It was performed by Nova Scotian/Canadian actor Jeff Douglas and directed by an American, Kevin Donovan, but written by a Canadian, Glen Hunt. The commercial won local, national and international success.

The ad was tested live in front of movie goers in theatres in Ottawa and deemed successful enough to run on-air.

It was the work of the public relations agency Thornley Fallis together with Molson that helped garner local, national and International awards. Director Kelly Swinney(Donovan) and team won the Canadian Public Relations award, the national Gold Quill award and the International Public Relations award in 2001.

In 2002, John Robert Colombo included the Rant in the Penguin Treasury of Popular Canadian Poems and Songs. Colombo acknowledged that it was unusual to include the text of a beer commercial in a poetry collection, but emphasized that "the open-minded reader will respond to the power of the words that express a human need to affirm an identity in the face of ignorance and indifference," and compared it to the works of Christopher Smart, Ebenezer Elliot, and Vachel Lindsay.

=== We are Canadian ===
An update to the popular version was released in 2025 with a central message that Canada will not submit to the United States, especially in light of President Trump's recent threats to impose tariffs and suggest that Canada could become the 51st state. The ad again features Jeff Douglas who expresses national pride and emphasizes Canada's identity, mentioning various aspects of Canadian values, including kindness and universal healthcare with a mix of humour and serious patriotic tugs. The ad showcases a mix of national stereotypes that build from modesty to a powerful declaration of Canadian spirit. It invokes pride in Canada as a large and unique country known for its contributions to yoga pants, Poutine, Ketchup chip, ice hockey, and national unity. The renewed interest stems from Trump's comments, inspiring a wave of patriotism among Canadians.

=== Parodies ===
The popularity of "I Am Canadian" in Canada led to many parodies of the advertisement. Several radio stations have produced provincial variations on the theme. These include I am an Albertan, I am a British Columbian, I am a Newfoundlander, and I Am Not Canadian, the last of which focused on the Quebec sovereignty movement.

William Shatner performed his own variation on the idea in a Just for Laughs appearance. He announced to the world: "I am not a Starfleet commander, ...or T.J. Hooker." The rant continues, making fun of Trekkies and his own typecasting as James T. Kirk, as well as Molson itself ("I drink Labatt's, not Romulan ale!").

Weasel, the lead character of I Am Weasel, parodied the advertisement in a promotional ad for the series' home, Cartoon Network. The ad later aired on a similar Canadian outlet, Teletoon.

During the 2002 Swiss National Exposition, the Swiss National Bank pavilion featured an "Ich bin Schweizer" adaptation of the ad, using stereotypes held by Germans about the Swiss.

At the Juno Awards of 2022, actor and host Simu Liu opened the ceremony with an updated riff on the "I Am Canadian" ad, highlighting contemporary signifiers such as multicultural food, runaway housing prices and the legalization of marijuana.

=== Trivia ===
This commercial premiered during the Academy Awards, which, in that year, included Robin Williams singing the song "Blame Canada", a satirical song from the movie South Park: Bigger, Longer & Uncut.

== "The Anthem" ==
This ad features famous moments from Canadian history (including the pounding of the Last Spike and the raising of the Maple Leaf flag), as well as a variety of average Canadians (including William Shatner), singing a song extolling the virtues of Canada and its citizens.

== See also ==
- Canadian beer
