= Don't Call Me Shurley =

- Supernatural episode
- Episode no.: Season 11; Episode 20
- Directed by: Robert Singer
- Written by: Robbie Thompson
- Cinematography by: Serge Ladouceur
- Editing by: Nicole Baer
- Production code: 4X6270
- Original air date: May 4, 2016
- Running time: 42 minutes

Guest appearances
- Rob Benedict as Chuck Shurley/God; Curtis Armstrong as Metatron; Tim Kelleher as Sheriff Macready; Sonja Bennett as Deputy Jan Harris

Episode chronology
← Previous "The Chitters"	Next → "All in the Family"
- Supernatural season 11

"Don't Call Me Shurley" is the twentieth episode of the paranormal drama television series Supernatural's season 11, and the 238th overall. The episode was written by co-executive producer Robbie Thompson and directed by executive consultant Robert Singer. It was first broadcast on May 4, 2016 on The CW. In the episode, after Amara unleashes another attack, Sam and Dean look through a way to stop her while the prophet Chuck Shurley returns to face her. The episode finally confirmed the theories among the series' fans that speculated that Chuck was God. The title is a reference to the phrase "Don't call me Shirley" from the 1980 film Airplane! in a dialogue between Robert Hays and Leslie Nielsen.

The episode received critical acclaim, with God's identity finally revealed and Metatron's and Chuck's chemistry praised.

== Plot ==
Metatron (Curtis Armstrong) is looking for food on a dumpster when he is suddenly transported to a bar where he finds prophet Chuck Shurley (Rob Benedict). Chuck gives Metatron glasses and when he puts them on, angels begin singing and a stunned Metatron realizes the shining Chuck is God. He wants Metatron to help Him finish His autobiography, with which He's been having problems.

Chuck reveals He's been traveling the world and only seems interested in His time on Earth as a human. Metatron criticizes most of the autobiography for giving no details, and God in His response unknowingly reveals that He has sympathy for Lucifer's misdeeds. Over the course of their conversation, He also mentions He likes the Winchesters and constantly brought back Castiel for them, but He is done helping them since their quest to destroy the Mark caused Amara to be released upon the world. At some point, the former angel asks Him why Dean's amulet didn't glow near Chuck, when it was said to glow brightly in the presence of God. God says He “turned it off”, and then produces the amulet and turns it on again, causing it to shine. When Metatron asks God why He created the world, He says He was lonely, and that He hoped that by creating things He could convince Amara to be better, but she just destroyed everything every single time. He then locked her away and created the universe, but after seeing all the conflict both humans and angels create, He walked away to let them sort it out for themselves. He reveals that He sees no point in fighting Amara again and would rather let her destroy the world.

Meanwhile, Sam (Jared Padalecki) and Dean (Jensen Ackles) investigate a murder-suicide in a town called Hope Springs. Sam discovers that the murderer had black veins on his lower arms, recalling the insanity virus Amara spread shortly after her release. Deputy Jan Harris (Sonja Bennett) is exposed to a strange fog and contracts the same virus, causing her to murder her husband. Sam and Dean find her but she tries to kill them, which prompts Sheriff Macready (Tim Kelleher) to shoot her. The fog then reappears and begins to cover the entire town, causing Sam, Dean, the Sheriff and many townspeople to hide in the police station.

God then shows Metatron a news report about the fog, shocking Metatron. The former angel is disgusted by God's apathy towards Amara, and tells Him that He's become a coward and that the humans are His greatest creations, because although they have many bad qualities, they never give up. In the meantime, Sam too is infected by the fog, and Dean, who remains unaffected by it, calls out to God to intervene. God meanwhile writes the final part of His autobiography, and afterwards, while an apparently moved Metatron is reading it, grabs a guitar and starts singing “Dink's Song”. In Hope Springs, Dean finds the amulet in Sam's pocket glowing brightly, and realizes that Sam has been restored and that the fog is gone. As they go outside, they find that all the townspeople have been restored to sanity, while those who had died have also been restored to life before they find Chuck helping people. With the amulet burning bright in his presence, it becomes clear of who Chuck is to the brothers and he tells them they need to talk.

== Reception ==
=== Viewers ===
The episode was watched by 1.54 million viewers with a 0.6/2 share among adults aged 18 to 49. This was an 8% decrease in viewership from the previous episode, which was watched by 1.67 million viewers. This means that 0.6 percent of all households with televisions watched the episode, while 2 percent of all households watching television at that time watched it. Supernatural ranked as the second most watched program on The CW in the day, behind Arrow. It also ranked as the 103rd most watched show in the week.

=== Critical reviews ===
Professional ratings
Review scores
Source	Rating
IGN	8.6
TV Fanatic	4.8/5 stars
Den of Geek	5/5 stars

"Don't Call Me Shurley" received critical acclaim. Matt Fowler of IGN gave the episode a "great" 8.6 out of 10 and wrote in his verdict, "'Don't Call Me Shurley' may not have been the 'Wow!' we were waiting for, after so long, with regards to the show's big God reveal, but it made up some ground with a compelling, dominating (and often funny) story between God and Metatron and the Almighty's want/need to complete his memoirs. And Metatron's sage, and harsh, advice as an editor who wanted God to write a 'warts and all' account of his journey."

Sean McKenna from TV Fanatic, gave a 4.8 star rating out of 5, stating: "How awesome was it to see Sam, Dean and Chuck reunited once again, with the brothers realizing who their friend actually was before the 'We should probably talk' line? What a superb way to end the hour. This episode really made me want to go back and see the series from the beginning with the definitive knowledge that Chuck is God. And of course, it got me excited for what's next and wondering just how God is going to play into the final episodes of Supernatural Season 11."

Bridget LaMonica from Den of Geek, gave a perfect 5 star rating out of 5, stating: "The episode was loaded with hilarious one liners and quips from many characters, but Chuck stole the show in the first half. He even claimed he was writing a new series, titled Revolution, but didn't think it was going anywhere. Funny nod to the show by Supernatural creator Eric Kripke that was canceled in 2014. I never thought Supernatural would dare bring God to the show, but now I'm glad they have. "

Samantha Highfill of EW wrote, "For Supernatural fans, tonight's episode has been years in the making. Not only did it mark the return of Chuck, but it finally solidified what many of us have assumed since the season 5 finale: Chuck is, in fact, God. And I have to say, for God's epic return, this episode did not disappoint. Rather, his return allowed for the most meta episode probably since 'Baby,' and it was so, so much fun."

MaryAnn Sleasman of TV.com wrote, "After plodding through weeks of filler, 'Don't Call Me Shurley' was the kind of major turn that Supernatural's central story needed as we enter Season 11's final episodes. It gave us the momentum to move forward (finally) while simultaneously grabbing onto the bits and pieces of past that have fallen to the side, been lost in the Impala's well-worn seats, and forgotten in Sam Winchester's massive pockets like a certain amulet that's been missing since that time Dean and Sam died and went to heaven and realized it sucked."
