= Julian Lawrence =

Canadian cartoonist (born 1963)

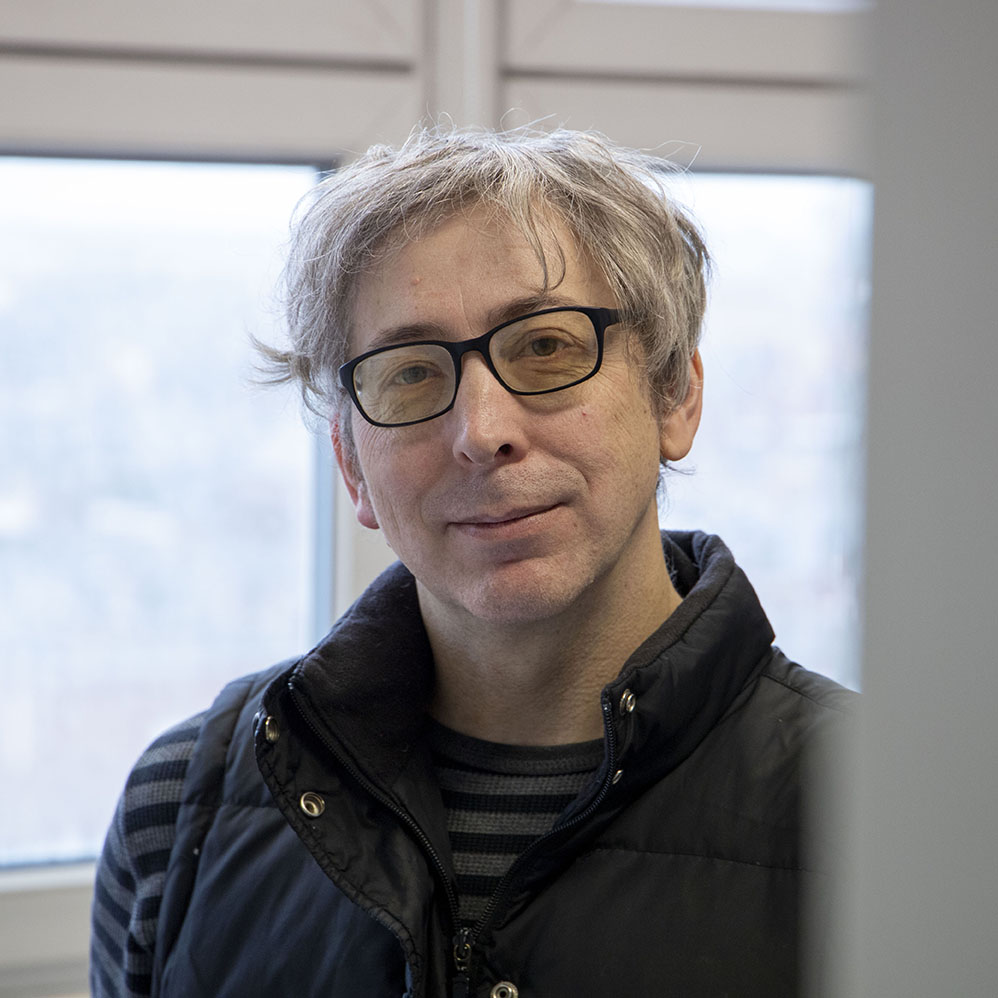
- Lawrence in 2019
- Born: December 29, 1963 (age 62); Portsmouth, England
- Citizenship: Canadian/British
- Education: University of British Columbia
- Occupations: Senior Lecturer in Comics and Graphic Novels
- Employer: Teesside University

Julian Lawrence is a Canadian cartoonist, educator and comics scholar. A longtime member of Vancouver's DIY independent art scene, Lawrence is also an arts educator and researcher, with a specialization in using hand drawn comics as a tool to improve literacy, develop storytelling techniques and form identity. He currently resides in Middlesbrough, England, where he is a Senior Lecturer in the Comics and Graphic Novels B.A. Honours program at Teesside University.

== Career ==
Born in Portsmouth, England, Lawrence immigrated as a child with his family to Québec in the mid-1960s, during an era of intense anti-English sentiment in that Province. To cope with the social rejection from his Francophone classmates, Lawrence turned to reading and writing comics for both entertainment and as a tool for improving his French language literacy.

=== Artist ===
In 1989, Lawrence moved to Vancouver, British Columbia, where he worked as an independent artist on a variety of projects, including: writer/illustrator for Fantagraphics (three issues of "Crucial Fiction", a historical biography comic series); storyboard artist for the a.k.a. Cartoon animated series Ed, Edd n Eddy; character designer for the Aboriginal Peoples Television Network animated series Artie the Ant and Senior Editor at Zeros2Heroes Media.

In the spring of 1999, Lawrence co-created (along with Robert Dayton) the Drippy Gazette – a short-lived (12 issues) monthly two-color newspaper featuring comics from Vancouver artists, with each issue cover featuring an anthropomorphized raindrop named Drippy the Newsboy. From this, Lawrence subsequently won a grant from the Xeric Foundation in 2000 which he used to help publish Drippytown Comics, an anthology series which grew out from the Gazette and served to showcase the work of each contributing artist. Notable artists included Colin Upton and Jason Turner.

==== The Magical Life of Long Tack Sam ====
In 2007, Lawrence contributed artwork to The Magical Life of Long Tack Sam, a graphic novel documenting the life of a once famous Chinese vaudeville performer. The book was named on the American Library Association's Top Ten Graphic Novels for Teens and won the Doug Wright Award in 2008. Lawrence also worked on the animated film adaptation, produced by the National Film Board of Canada.

==== The Adventures of Drippy the Newsboy ====
In 2014, Lawrence re-purposed his character Drippy the Newsboy as the protagonist for a comic book trilogy based on the writings of American author Stephen Crane. Lawrence emulated Crane's literary narrative style by contrasting exceptionally detailed artwork with slang-filled dialogue. Conundrum Press published three volumes of The Adventures of Drippy the Newsboy: Volume I: Drippy's Mama (2015); Volume II: The Red Drip of Courage (2015) and Volume III: The Dripping Boat (2020).

== Music ==
Lawrence was a founding member of Vancouver avant garde musical collective July Fourth Toilet.

== Awards ==
- Jeanette Andrews Scholarship in Art Education, University of British Columbia, 2017
- Freeperson Award, Best Cartoon/Illustration (co-authored with Dr. Rita Irwin & Dr. Ching-Chiu Lin), The Canadian Association of Labour Media (CALM), 2016
- Gene Day Award, Best Self-Published Comic (anthology contributor, edited by Bevan Thomas), 2016
- Pop Vox Award, Best Digital Learning Initiative, 2009
- Sophie Burnett Award, Emily Carr University, 2009
- Doug Wright Award, Best Book (written, compiled and edited by Ann Marie Fleming), 2008
- Achievement Award, Emily Carr University, 2007 & 2008

== Bibliography ==
- Lawrence, J. (Accepted/In press). 'Where the Action Is: Crumb, Semiotics, L'Ecriture Feminine, and Taste'. In D. Worden (Ed.), The Art of R. Crumb
- Lawrence, J. (2020) The adventures of Drippy the newsboy: volume III: The dripping boat. Wolfville NS, Conundrum Press. ISBN 978-1-77262-045-0
- Lawrence, J. (2020) Cartoons have always been for adults but here’s how they got tangled up with kids. Available at: https://theconversation.com/cartoons-have-always-been-for-adults-but-heres-how-they-got-tangled-up-with-kids-130421 [Accessed: 08 Feb 2020]
- Lawrence, J and Archer, N. (2019) Martin Scorsese says superhero movies are ‘not cinema’: two experts debate. Available at: https://theconversation.com/martin-scorsese-says-superhero-movies-are-not-cinema-two-experts-debate-125771 [Accessed: 08 Feb 2020]
- Lawrence, Julian, Lin, C-C., & Can, I. (2019) 'Relational Connections through the Space of Learning: Exploring Youths' Experiences of Filmmaking with Comics', International Journal of Education Through Art 15(3). DOI: 10.1386eta_00004_3
- Lawrence, J. 'Visualizing Conflicting Worldviews: The Comics Page and the Computer Screen' (2017). Journal of Cultural Research in Art Education, # 34.
- Lawrence, Julian, Lin, C-C., Irwin, R. & Lum A: Mentoring through the Comics. (2017) (Kutsyuruba, Benjamin & Walker, Keith. (2017). The Bliss and Blisters of Early Career Teaching: A Pan-Canadian Perspective.) Word & Deed. ISBN 978-0-9918626-9-6
- Lawrence, Julian; Lin, C-C; and Irwin, R. (2017) "Images, Speech Balloons, and Artful Representation: Comics as Visual Narratives of Early Career Teachers," SANE journal: Sequential Art Narrative in Education: Vol. 2 : Iss. 2, Article 3.
- “Mentorship Comics” (2016). (Co-authored with Dr. Rita Irwin and Dr. Ching-Chiu Lin). BC Mentoring (webcomic).
- “Why Is Teacher Mentorship Essential?” (2016). Comics essay (co-authored with Dr. Rita Irwin and Dr. Ching-Chiu Lin). Teacher Newsmagazine. Sep/Oct, pp. 18–19.
- “Changing Notions of Teacher Mentorship in British Columbia” (2016). Comics essay (co-authored with Dr. Rita Irwin and Dr. Ching-Chiu Lin). The Canadian Association of Principals Journal. Fall issue, pp. 44–47.
- “Mentorship Confidential!” (2015). Comics essay (Co-authored with Dr. Rita Irwin and Dr. Ching-Chiu Lin). Teacher Newsmagazine. May/Jun, pp. 8–9.
- Lawrence, J. (2015) The adventures of Drippy the newsboy: volume I: Drippy's mama. Greenwich NS, Conundrum Press. ISBN 1-894994-94-9
- Lawrence, J. (2015) The adventures of Drippy the newsboy: volume II: The red drip of courage. Wolfville NS, Conundrum Press. ISBN 1-894994-98-1
