= Long Tack Sam =

American magician, acrobat, and vaudeville performer (1884–1961)

- 1919 colour lithograph poster printed in Hamburg, Germany
- Born: Lung Te Shan; September 16, 1884; Wuqiao County, Shandong, Qing China
- Died: August 7, 1961 (aged 76); Linz, Austria
- Other names: Sam Tack Long, Tack Sam Long
- Occupation: Performance Artist
- Years active: ? – 1958
- Spouse: Poldi Rössler Long
- Children: 3
- Relatives: Ann Marie Fleming (great-granddaughter)

Long Tack Sam
- Chinese: 郎德山
Transcriptions
Standard Mandarin
- Hanyu Pinyin: Láng Déshān
- Wade–Giles: Lang2 Te2-shan1

Lung Te Shan (Chinese: 郎德山; September 16, 1884 – August 7, 1961), known by his stage name Long Tack Sam, was a Chinese-born American magician, acrobat, and vaudeville performer.

== Early life and career ==
Long Tack Sam, also known as Tack Sam Long and Sam Tack Long, was the stage name of performance artist Lung Te Shan. He was born in Wuqiao County, an area of Shandong Province in Northeast China that is internationally understood to be the birthplace of Chinese acrobatics. On most official documents during his life in America, he used Sam Tack Long (the Cantonese pronunciation of his Chinese name) as his legal name.

Little is known about Long's early years; what is known is that he joined a group of acrobats around the turn of the century called the Tian-Kwai and went on a world tour. Several years later, with unrest in his homeland, Long brought his troupe of entertainers to America, where he soon found success. His magnificently dressed troupe went on to play in major cities across the globe in the first decades of the twentieth century. Although forgotten mainly as a performer by contemporary audiences, he was considered one of the "greatest vaudeville acts of the early 20th century".

Long's career brought him to the opening act for the Marx Brothers, and he even became a mentor to Orson Welles. In 1922, he became a member of Houdini's Magicians Club. Bennett Cerf once wrote of an incident of theatre lore that occurred at the Palace Theatre in New York when entertainer Bert Fitzgibbon became enraged upon learning Long was billed above him in the night's card, meaning that he was scheduled to follow the magician on stage. Later that night as Long was ending his show, Fitzgibbon walked on stage and handed him a bundle of dirty shirts and reportedly said, "I want these back by Saturday night and go easy on the starch!" Long responded with an uppercut, resulting in Fitzgibbon being carried off stage as the audience applauded and roared their approval. It is unclear whether or not Fitzgibbon was able to make his appointed curtain call.

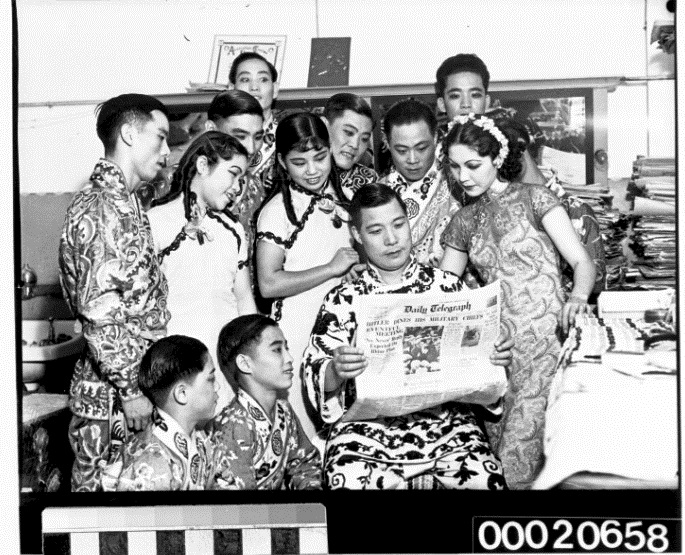
Long Tack Sam with his company of artists

Long and his family decided to travel to Australia and New Zealand, bringing his act to new audiences. He promoted his show by skydiving into Bondi Beach, dropping leaflets offering free tickets to that evening's performance. Sam and his "wonder workers" performed in countless theatrical spaces across Australia during the 1920s and 1930s, including Sydney's State Theatre, Melbourne's Tivoli Theatre, Adelaide's Regent Theatre, Hobart's Prince of Wales Theatre, Perth's Ambassadors Theatre and Brisbane's Wintergarden Theatre.

In 1958, Long's final performance was also staged in New York, at the Roxy Theatre. He performed his famous water bowl trick, in which he did a somersault at age 73 and ended up standing with a goldfish bowl in his left hand.

== Personal life and death ==
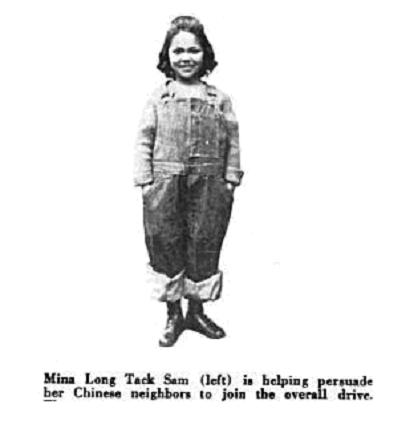
Mi-na Long circa 1920

After decades of performing and travelling extensively around the world, Long and his wife Leopoldi (known as Poldi), a native of Ybbs, Austria, retired to New York City. Long was also a Freemason and achieved the notable step of 32nd degree within the fraternal order. He presumably maintained his associations with the order while residing in New York. Later, following a bad car accident, he and Poldi went to Linz, Austria, not far from her hometown. Long Tack Sam died there in 1961 at the age of 76. Poldi died in Vienna two years later. Long had two daughters and one son.

== Documentary film ==
The greatest source of historical information available on Long Tack Sam's life comes from a Canadian documentary, The Magical Life of Long Tack Sam. Written, directed, researched and animated by Long's great-granddaughter Ann Marie Fleming, the story is an in-depth research of the magician's life. Through six years of research and the assistance of several magic historians, Fleming uncovered many missing holes in the historical narrative of her great-grandfather's life.

== Illustrated memoir ==
In September 2007, The Magical Life of Long Tack Sam: An Illustrated Memoir by Ann Marie Fleming was published by Riverhead Books, a division of Penguin Publishing. The book expands on the information in the biographical film and puts Long Tack Sam's life in a more historical context. In 2008, the book won The Doug Wright Award for best book. The book features artwork by Julian Lawrence.
