= All in the Family (Supernatural) =

- Supernatural episode
- Episode no.: Season 11; Episode 21
- Directed by: Thomas J. Wright
- Written by: Eugenie Ross-Leming; Brad Buckner
- Cinematography by: Serge Ladouceur
- Editing by: James Pickel
- Production code: 4X6271
- Original air date: May 11, 2016
- Running time: 41 minutes

Guest appearances
- Rob Benedict as Chuck Shurley/God; Curtis Armstrong as Metatron; Emily Swallow as Amara/The Darkness; Osric Chau as Kevin Tran; Keith Szarabajka as Donatello Redfield

Episode chronology
← Previous "Don't Call Me Shurley"	Next → "We Happy Few"
- Supernatural season 11

"All in the Family" is the twenty-first episode of the paranormal drama television series Supernatural's season 11, and the 239th overall. The episode was written by co-executive producers Eugenie Ross-Leming & Brad Buckner and directed by Thomas J. Wright. It was first broadcast on May 11, 2016 on The CW. In the episode, Sam and Dean set to find Lucifer/Castiel as he continues being tortured by Amara while God has a new strategy as Metatron finds a new Prophet. The title is a reference to the hit TV show All in the Family.

The episode received critical acclaim, with critics commenting on Metatron's choice and the new Prophet.

== Plot ==
Picking up where the previous episode left, Sam (Jared Padalecki) and Dean (Jensen Ackles) are astounded to find Chuck (Rob Benedict). He then transports them to the bunker where He invokes the spirit of Kevin Tran (Osric Chau) and then sends him to Heaven. Now realizing Chuck is God, Sam is a bit excited but Dean is mad at Him for having abandoned humanity when they were in trouble though Chuck tells him to stop shifting his issues with his father on Him. Meanwhile, Amara (Emily Swallow) continues torturing Lucifer/Castiel (Misha Collins) as a way to lure God.

Amara appears to Dean in an hallucination to show him Lucifer's health state. That night, another fog attacks a town called Lewis in Oklahoma and kills everyone in the town, except for a professor named Donatello Redfield (Keith Szarabajka). Metatron (Curtis Armstrong) is informed by this in a bar and notices Sam and Dean during a report of Hope Springs. He contacts Sam and Dean to find Donatello. When they interrogate him, Donatello reveals he suffered visions (the same Kevin showed when he was chosen as a Prophet), and they come to realize that Donatello is a Prophet.

Metatron then shows Sam and Dean God's autobiography, which is in fact a suicide note as he will sacrifice himself battling Amara. Dean confronts him on this choice as God tells them that he will be protecting his creations this way before stating if he failed, Sam and Dean will take over. Dean then tells him he shouldn't sacrifice himself, as God considers it.

While Sam, Metatron and Donatello rescue Lucifer from Amara's hideout, Dean tries to distract her. Eventually, she discovers Dean has met God and that they're planning on freeing Lucifer from her. Metatron stays behind and tries to hold back Amara but she's too powerful for his cast and he is imploded into nothingness. She catches Sam, Lucifer and Donatello while trying to free and tries to kill them, when they're transported by God to the Bunker.

God and Lucifer finally meet face to face for the first time in millennia and God heals Lucifer's wounds. Sam and Dean send Donatello back home and Dean states to Sam that Amara has plans for him.

== Reception ==
=== Viewers ===
The episode was watched by 1.75 million viewers with a 0.7/2 share among adults aged 18 to 49. This was a 13% increase in viewership from the previous episode, which was watched by 1.54 million viewers. This means that 0.7 percent of all households with televisions watched the episode, while 2 percent of all households watching television at that time watched it. Supernatural ranked as the second most watched program on The CW in the day, behind Arrow.

=== Critical reviews ===
Professional ratings
Review scores
Source	Rating
IGN	8.3
TV Fanatic	4.2
Den of Geek	5/5 stars

"All in the Family" received critical acclaim. Matt Fowler of IGN gave the episode a "great" 8.3 out of 10 and wrote in his verdict, "'All in the Family' seemed to work, in the end, getting everyone (who survived) on the same page regarding the Darkness. It wasn't a flat episode, but it also wasn't the most thrilling. Once again, Chuck had to snap his fingers and save our heroes in the end, which helped demonstrate how formidable Amara is. Though Chuck's fickleness about most everything makes him more of a wild card than an ally."

Sean McKenna from TV Fanatic, gave a 4.2 star rating out of 5, stating: "If anything, this hour had its moving parts, but it was a stepping stone toward getting to that big match. I'm invested and intrigued by what's to come, but I just hope there's some solid payoff when all is said and done."

Bridget LaMonica from Den of Geek, gave a perfect 5 star rating out of 5, stating: "God, Lucifer and Amara, oh my! This episode took off right where the last left off, with Dean and Sam staring in shock at the former Prophet Chuck. His credibility was accounted for by bringing Kevin forward, and sending him on his way to Heaven. Be still, my heart."

Samantha Highfill of EW wrote, "Ever since the apocalypse story line in seasons 4 and 5, I've hoped and, quite fittingly, prayed that this show would eventually get back around to one of the things it does best: using religion to tell its story. And one could make the argument that this season uses it more than any other, considering the official introduction of God. Regardless, this week's episode was yet another reminder of why those stories work so well for this show. Because if this show specializes in family drama, there's no better family drama than that of God, his sister, and all of his children."

MaryAnn Sleasman of TV.com wrote, "Well, they can't all be mind-blowing, mythology-smashing, head-canon-confirming buckets of awesome. 'All in the Family' was a textbook example of the perils of mediocrity. Had it not aired on the coattails of last week's OMFG 'Don't Call Me Shurley,' 'All in the Family' would have — could have - landed a spot as one of the stronger episodes of the season and been a welcome return to the dominant storyline. Don't get me wrong: 'All in the Family' was not a bad episode by any means. It's just that compared to the episode that preceded it, 'All in the Family' was, well, kind of boring."
