= Teresa Pavlinek =

Canadian actor, writer, TV producer (born 1970)

- Born: August 11, 1970 (age 56)
- Occupations: actor, writer, television producer
- Years active: 2000–present

Teresa Pavlinek (born August 11, 1970) is a Canadian actress, writer, and television producer best known as the creator and star of The Jane Show.

== Career ==
Pavlinek studied at McMaster University in Hamilton, Ontario, and became part of Second City Toronto after graduating. She made guest appearances on The Sean Cullen Show, Royal Canadian Air Farce, Bless The Child, Improv Heaven and Hell, and Sue Thomas: F.B.Eye. She starred in five seasons of the Gemini-nominated History Channel series History Bites.

Her short plays include Dumplings and Death and Hot August Night, and her first full-length play, Made You Look, was written as a member of the Tarragon Theatre Playwrights Unit.

Pavlinek is part of the female comedy troupe Women Fully Clothed. In 2016, she appeared in a recurring role as Dana, a police medical examiner on the CBS crime/mystery series American Gothic.
