= We Happy Few (Supernatural) =

- Supernatural episode
- Episode no.: Season 11; Episode 22
- Directed by: John Badham
- Written by: Robert Berens
- Cinematography by: Serge Ladouceur
- Editing by: Donald L. Koch
- Production code: 4X6272
- Original air date: May 18, 2016
- Running time: 41 minutes

Guest appearances
- Ruth Connell as Rowena; Emily Swallow as Amara/The Darkness; Rob Benedict as Chuck Shurley/God; Barbara Eve Harris as Clea; Keith Szarabajka as Donatello Redfield

Episode chronology
← Previous "All in the Family"	Next → "Alpha and Omega"
- Supernatural season 11

"We Happy Few" is the twenty-second episode of the paranormal drama television series Supernatural's season 11, and the 240th overall. The episode was written by executive story editor Robert Berens and directed by John Badham. It was first broadcast on May 18, 2016 on The CW. In the episode, God assembles a team of angels, demons and witches in an attempt to lock Amara away using the Mark of Cain to be transferred to Sam.

The episode received positive reviews, with critics praising the show's unexpected cliffhanger.

== Plot ==
Lucifer (Misha Collins) is mad at God (Rob Benedict) for having punished him as well as having trusted the Mark of Cain in him and refuses to speak to Him. Meanwhile, Crowley (Mark A. Sheppard) summons a meeting between demons but they refuse to go along with his plans to retake Hell because of his previous incidents.

Rowena (Ruth Connell) arrives with a witch, Clea (Barbara Eve Harris) to carry on a spell. She reluctantly agrees as previous spells have killed many witches. Lucifer and God talk where God admits that He trusted the Mark of Cain to him because he was His favorite son. When that was proven wrong, God was angry at Himself, confessing that was part of the reason He banished Lucifer along with protecting humanity and this causes them to make amends.

However, God states that He can't kill Amara, because it would cause "the end of reality". They decide that they need all angels to try to stop her but Michael is not able to fight and God does not have enough time to revive Gabriel and Raphael. Castiel temporarily retains his body and goes back to Heaven to convince the angels to join them, and Dean goes to Crowley for help while Sam interrupts Rowena and Clea to get them on board. Rowena and Clea agree to use their coven for help. God then states that they will return Amara back to retain the Mark of Cain and that Sam agreed to be the carrier of the Mark, worrying Dean that Sam may repeat his behavior when he carried it.

After Amara eats Donatello's (Keith Szarabajka) soul, Rowena guides Amara to the bunker and confronts her. She uses the combined power of the coven to harm her but is not powerful enough to defeat her. Amara kills the coven and knocks Rowena out. The angels strike her from above and Crowley then invokes demons to attack Amara, which injures her. She enters the bunker, where Lucifer impales her with an angelic spear. She then gets God to admit part of the reason He created things was to rule over them, and He hated how they were equals. God begins to replace the Mark, which is passing over to Sam. However, Amara resists, refusing to go back to being locked away and attacks God, fatally injuring him. When Lucifer tries to intervene, Amara yanks him from Castiel, leaving his fate unknown.

Meanwhile, outside, Rowena wakes up and realizes that the sky is turning red. Inside the bunker, Sam and Dean stare in shock at God's body, with Amara stating that she wounded Him and He will slowly die but not before watching the humankind "turn to ashes." Amara then disappears.

== Reception ==
=== Viewers ===
The episode was watched by 1.59 million viewers with a 0.6/2 share among adults aged 18 to 49. This was a 10% decrease in viewership from the previous episode, which was watched by 1.75 million viewers. This means that 0.6 percent of all households with televisions watched the episode, while 2 percent of all households watching television at that time watched it. Supernatural ranked as the second most watched program on The CW in the day, behind Arrow.

=== Critical reviews ===
Professional ratings
Review scores
Source	Rating
IGN	8.4
TV Fanatic	2.5/5.0 stars
Den of Geek	5/5 stars

"We Happy Few" received mixed reviews. Matt Fowler of IGN gave the episode a "great" 8.4 out of 10 and wrote in his verdict, "'We Happy Few' gave us the endgame battle against Amara the one might have assumed would be saved for the finale. I didn't mind getting in a week early though. It was cool to see everyone take their shot at the Darkness. And basically defeat her. That is until Chuck got her super-pissed again and she took him out. And for a brief, exciting moment, it seemed like it was 'for good.' Too bad Amara had to go all Bane on us and keep Chuck around so that he could watch the world turn to ash first."

Sean McKenna from TV Fanatic, gave a 2.5 star rating out of 5, stating: "What a disappointing penultimate episode and way to head into the finale. Rather than being psyched up, I’m apprehensive about what’s to come and far less excited than I want to be. Fingers crossed we get a major turnaround before sending the show into hiatus."

Bridget LaMonica from Den of Geek, gave a perfect 5 star rating out of 5, stating: "There's going to be some serious repercussions if this goes through. I, for one, am not eager to see a 'Sam struggling with the Mark' season because that will seem too similar to what happened with Dean. Things likely won't go down that exact road, so there's another twist or two headed our way in relation to that secret deal."

Samantha Highfill of EW wrote, "After 11 years spent with Sam and Dean, I thought I knew what a sibling disagreement looked like (and it usually involved tears and some time apart). But the Winchesters, simply by nature of being human, have nothing on the sibling dynamics of God and Amara. Turns out, locking your sibling in a cage for all of eternity is pretty much going to ruin your relationship. But at least it makes for interesting TV."

MaryAnn Sleasman of TV.com wrote, "This episode felt like a whole lot of poo slung at the wall with an explosion in the middle because it's the episode before the season finale and therefore requires a big messy fight. Sam and Dean were literally relegated to the peanut gallery. It was Amara's party and she got to do a whole lot of crying followed by a whole lot of smiting and the ongoing WTF weird sexual tension with Dean that still makes me want to claw my face off. Is their epic love supposed to save the world? Is that what Chuck was getting at? I don't freaking know and I'm starting to not freaking care."
