= Christoph Girardet =

German filmmaker and artist

- Born: 1966; Langenhagen, Germany
- Occupation(s): Filmmaker, artist
- Years active: 1989–present
- Website: http://www.christophgirardet.de

Christoph Girardet is a German filmmaker and artist. He lives and works in Hanover.

== Biography ==
Girardet studied fine arts and film/video from 1988 to 1993 at the Braunschweig University of Art under Gerhard Büttenbender and Birgit Hein.

He had produced videos, video-installations and films since 1989. He collaborated with Volker Schreiner and often works with Matthias Müller.

Christoph Girardet works primarily with found footage. It serves as source material for his visual research, in the course of which he initially dissembles and deconstructs scenes, before reassembling them in a way such that the actual structures and internal mechanisms of their content are rendered visible.

In 2000 Girardet received a scholarship for the International Studio & Curatorial Program in New York and in 2004 the Villa Massimo scholarship in Rome.

== Filmography ==
- Contre-jour (2009) (Special mention at the 59th Berlin International Film Festival)
- Kristall (2006) (Won the Deutscher Kurzfilmpreis)
