= Punch (2002 film) =

- Directed by: Guy Bennett
- Written by: Guy Bennett
- Produced by: Stephen Hegyes
- Starring: Michael Riley; Sonja Bennett; Meredith McGeachie
- Cinematography: Gregory Middleton
- Edited by: Richard Schwadel
- Music by: James Jandrisch
- Production company: Brightlight Pictures
- Distributed by: ThinkFilm
- Release date: September 10, 2002 (TIFF)
- Running time: 90 minutes
- Country: Canada
- Language: English

Punch is a Canadian dark comedy film, directed by Guy Bennett and released in 2002.

== Plot ==
The film stars Michael Riley as Sam Frizzell, a widowed single father in Vancouver, British Columbia whose desire to find a new partner is complicated by his daughter Ariel's (Sonja Bennett) jealousy of any new woman in his life. However, when Ariel physically attacks Sam's newest love interest Mary (Marcia Laskowski), Mary's sister Julie (Meredith McGeachie), a lesbian professional boxer, comes to her sister's defense. The film's cast also includes Vincent Gale, Kathryn Kirkpatrick, Don Ackerman and Sarah Lind.

== Production ==
The role of Ariel was suggested to Guy Bennett by a producer, who pointed out that casting his own daughter would provide useful publicity for the project. Sonja Bennett auditioned and was cast, a process she has since characterized as straightforward nepotism, though the filmmakers first wanted assurance that she could carry the role.

Guy Bennett excused himself from the set when they shot the more revealing scene in which his daughter Sonja Bennett is sitting naked on a bed with her legs apart in an attempt to seduce her tutor, and watched from a monitor in another room. But the idea of putting his daughter in this vulnerable position never gave him pause for a moment. "Everything is subservient to the drama," he explained.

== Awards ==
At the Vancouver Film Critics Circle Awards 2002, Bennett won for Best Actress in a Canadian Film and McGeachie won for Best Supporting Actress in a Canadian Film. McGeachie received a Genie Award nomination for Best Supporting Actress at the 24th Genie Awards.

== Legacy ==
Punch's premiere at TIFF led to Sonja Bennett being approached by Fox Television, a development she has credited with launching her subsequent television career.
