= Terrance Odette =

Canadian film director and screenwriter

Terrance Odette is a Canadian film director and screenwriter. He is most noted for his films Saint Monica, which premiered at the 2002 Toronto International Film Festival, and Fall, which premiered at the 2014 Vancouver International Film Festival and was a Canadian Screen Award nominee for Best Picture at the 3rd Canadian Screen Awards in 2015.

Originally from Kitchener, Ontario, Odette was active as a folk singer for a number of years before his forays into directing music videos led him to conclude that he was a better filmmaker than a musician. He released his debut feature film Heater in 1999.

He also directed the film Sleeping Dogs (2006), and episodes of the television series Connor Undercover, How to Be Indie and Annedroids.

He was a nominee for the Directors Guild of Canada's DGC Award for Best Direction in a Feature Film in 2015 for Fall.
