= Blue Skies (2002 film) =

2002 Canadian short film directed by Ann Marie Fleming

- Directed by: Ann Marie Fleming
- Written by: Ann Marie Fleming
- Produced by: Dawn Rubin
- Starring: Alessandro Juliani; Stephanie Morgenstern
- Cinematography: Ron Williams
- Edited by: Brendan Woollard
- Music by: Patric Caird
- Production company: Global Mechanic
- Release date: August 25, 2002 (FFM)
- Running time: 7 minutes
- Country: Canada

Blue Skies is a 2002 Canadian short drama film, directed by Ann Marie Fleming. Created as a personal response to the September 11 attacks and told without dialogue, the film stars Alessandro Juliani as a Chinese opera performer who cannot stop crying in his dressing room, and Stephanie Morgenstern as a costume master who patiently dresses him and calms him down before his scheduled performance of Irving Berlin's song "Blue Skies".

The film premiered in August 2002 at the Montreal World Film Festival. It was subsequently screened at the 2002 Toronto International Film Festival, where it was named the winner of the Best Canadian Short Film award. It was a Genie Award nominee for Best Live Action Short Drama at the 23rd Genie Awards in 2003.
