= Kenneth Mitchell (actor) =

Canadian actor (1974–2024)

- Publicity photo
- Born: Kenneth Alexander Mitchell; November 25, 1974; Toronto, Ontario, Canada
- Died: February 24, 2024 (aged 49); Los Angeles, California, U.S.
- Occupation: Actor
- Years active: 1983–2022
- Spouse: Susan May Pratt (m. 2006)
- Children: 2

Kenneth Alexander Mitchell (November 25, 1974 – February 24, 2024) was a Canadian actor. He was known for his role as Eric Green in the CBS television series Jericho (2006–2008) and for portraying various characters in Star Trek: Discovery (2017–2021). In film, he appeared as Ralph Cox in the sports biopic Miracle (2004) and as Joseph Danvers in Captain Marvel (2019).

== Early life ==
Mitchell was born in Toronto on November 25, 1974. He attended Earl Haig Secondary School in his hometown, before studying landscape architecture at the University of Guelph. He subsequently worked in Toronto and Guelph, before becoming acquainted with an agent through his friend.

== Career ==
Mitchell began his acting career in commercials and independent productions. His first major roles came in Leap Years and Odyssey 5.

In 2004, Mitchell was cast in the film Miracle with Kurt Russell, in the role of hockey player Ralph Cox who was the last player cut from the 1980 Mens Olympic Hockey Team.

Mitchell appeared as Eric Green in the U.S. television drama Jericho, which was cancelled by CBS in May 2007, but was brought back onto the 2007–08 schedule following a fan campaign to save the show.

In 2014, Mitchell was cast in ABC's The Astronaut Wives Club television drama series, playing the role of Deke Slayton. Mitchell played three recurring Klingon characters in Star Trek: Discovery: season 1's Kol and season 2's Kol-Sha (Kol's father) and Tenavik. He also appeared in season 3 as Aurellio, a character whose use of a wheelchair-like device matched Mitchell's real situation with his progressing amyotrophic lateral sclerosis (ALS); Mitchell hinted that he would be seen in season 4 playing a character who, like Mitchell's progressing situation, has lost the use of his voice. Mitchell was cast in the FX series The Old Man by Dan Shotz, a friend of his who was also an executive producer on Jericho. The role also incorporated Mitchell's condition into the character.

== Personal life ==
Mitchell married actress Susan May Pratt in May 2006. Together, they had two children, a daughter (born 2007) and a son (born 2012). They resided in Los Angeles, where Mitchell relocated to in the mid-2000s.

In February 2020, Mitchell revealed that he had been diagnosed with amyotrophic lateral sclerosis (ALS), also known as Lou Gehrig's disease. Beginning in October 2019, he used a power wheelchair. To incorporate Mitchell's wheelchair, the showrunners of Star Trek: Discovery said Aurelio's wheelchair was a hover chair to help him move as a result of a genetic condition. By August 2021, Mitchell had lost his voice due to the disease. Mitchell died on February 24, 2024, at the age of 49.

== Filmography ==
Film roles
Year	Title	Role	Notes
2002	Why Don't You Dance?	Chris	Short film
2003	The Recruit	Alan	
2004	Miracle	Ralph Cox	
2007	Home of the Giants	Keith Morrison	
2015	5-25-77	John Dykstra	
2019	Captain Marvel	Joseph Danvers	

Television roles
Year	Title	Role	Notes
2001	Leap Years	Spencer Matthew	Recurring role, 9 episodes
2002	Odyssey 5	Marc Taggart	Recurring role, 10 episodes
2006	Grey's Anatomy	Wade Solomon	1 episode
2006	CSI: Miami	Robert Gordon	1 episode
2006	The Unit	Keith Soto	1 episode
2006–2008	Jericho	Eric Green	Main role, 26 episodes
2008	Flashpoint	Sergeant Pete Fitzhaven	1 episode
2008–2009	Ghost Whisperer	Sam Lucas	Recurring role, 15 episodes
2009	Without a Trace	Derek Wilson	1 episode
2009	Meteor	Russ Hapscomb	Miniseries, 2 episodes
2009	Iron Road	Edgar	Miniseries, 2 episodes
2010	Lie to Me	Duane Corey	1 episode
2010	Hawaii Five-0	Craig Ellers / Paul Stark	1 episode
2010	Detroit 1-8-7	Jeffery Cage	1 episode
2010	Criminal Minds	Drew Jacobs	1 episode
2011	Private Practice	Elliott	1 episode
2011	Castle	Paul Whittaker	1 episode
2011	The Mentalist	Tom Wilcox	1 episode
2012	Grimm	Larry McKenzie / Bigfoot	1 episode
2012	Drop Dead Diva	Rick Keller	1 episode
2012	CSI: Crime Scene Investigation	Dalton Burke	1 episode
2013	NCIS: Los Angeles	Special Agent Danny Gallagher	1 episode
2013	Monday Mornings	Asher Knox	1 episode
2013	Bones	Ben Carr	1 episode
2013	Body of Proof	Robert Riley	1 episode
2013	Haven	Cliff	1 episode
2014	The Night Shift	George	1 episode
2014	Switched at Birth	Wes	Recurring role, 12 episodes
2014	NCIS	Nathan Curtis	2 episodes
2015	CSI: Cyber	Steve Reynolds	1 episode
2015	The Astronaut Wives Club	Deke Slayton	Main role, 10 episodes
2015	Major Crimes	Sam Curtis	1 episode
2015	Minority Report	Brian Stanton	1 episode
2016	Code Black	Cory Rockman	1 episode
2016–2017	Frequency	Deacon Joe Hurley	Recurring role, 6 episodes
2016	Notorious	Detective Ken Matthews	3 episodes
2017–2021	Star Trek: Discovery	Kol / Kol-Sha / Tenavik / Aurellio	Recurring role, 10 episodes
2018	The Detectives	Detective Richard	1 episode
2019–2020	Nancy Drew	Joshua Dodd	Recurring role, 6 episodes
2020	Star Trek: Lower Decks	Black Ops Officer 2 / Romulan Guard 1 / Tweerk Captain	Voice role, 1 episode
2022	The Old Man	Joe	3 episodes
