= Why Don't You Dance? (film) =

2002 Canadian short film

- Directed by: Michael Downing
- Written by: Michael Downing
- Based on: "Why Don't You Dance?" by Raymond Carver
- Produced by: Joel Awerbuck; Bob Banack; Meredith Caplan
- Starring: Kenneth Mitchell; Deborah Pollitt; Bill McDonald
- Cinematography: Barry Stone
- Edited by: Michele Francis
- Production company: Charlotte Bernard Entertainment
- Distributed by: Tzimmes Entertainment
- Release date: September 2002 (TIFF)
- Running time: 21 minutes
- Country: Canada
- Language: English

Why Don't You Dance? is a 2002 Canadian short drama film, directed by Michael Downing. Adapted from Raymond Carver's short story "Why Don't You Dance?", the film centres on a young couple (Kenneth Mitchell and Deborah Pollitt) shopping at a yard sale, where the proprietor (Bill McDonald) ultimately accepts a dance with the woman on the lawn as payment instead of money.

The film premiered at the 2002 Toronto International Film Festival.

It was subsequently screened at the Moving Pictures Festival of Dance on Film and Video, although Glenn Sumi of Now characterized its inclusion in that event as "a bit of a stretch" since it wasn't really a dance film per se.

It received a Genie Award nomination for Best Live Action Short Drama at the 24th Genie Awards in 2004.
