= Meredith McGeachie =

Canadian television and film actress

Meredith McGeachie is a Canadian television and film actress.

== Education ==
McGeachie graduated from the theatre program at George Brown College.

== Career ==
She is most noted for her roles in the film Punch, for which she was a Genie Award nominee for Best Supporting Actress at the 24th Genie Awards, and her supporting television roles as Tonya in The L Word and Cate in Paradise Falls. She has also appeared in the films Free Fall, Bless the Child, Prince Charming and Horns, and the television series Earth: Final Conflict, Da Vinci's Inquest, Andromeda, Stargate: Atlantis, Ties That Bind and When We Rise.

At the Vancouver Film Critics Circle Awards 2002, McGeachie won for Best Supporting Actress in a Canadian Film for Punch.

== Filmography ==
=== Film ===
Year	Title	Role	Notes
1999	Free Fall	Waitress	
1999	Three to Tango	Megan	
2000	Bless the Child	Nurse	
2002	Punch	Julie	
2013	Horns	Mary	
2014	Jingle All the Way 2	Janie	

=== Television ===
Year	Title	Role	Notes
1998	Scandalous Me: The Jacqueline Susann Story	Editorial assistant	Television film
1998	Exhibit A: Secrets of Forensic Science	Cassandra Edmunds	Episode: "Six Little Letters"
1999	Earth: Final Conflict	TAD Leader	Episode: "Defector"
1999	If You Believe	Robin	Television film
2000	Anne of Green Gables: The Continuing Story	Red Cross Woman 1	Miniseries
2001	Prince Charming	Camille / 'Helena'	Television film
2001	Da Vinci's Inquest	Jill Grayson	Episode: "Ugly Quick"
2002, 2005	Andromeda	Geryon / Maia	2 episodes
2004–2006	The L Word	Tonya	10 episodes
2005	The Unauthorized Story of Mork & Mindy	Lila Milford	Television film
2006	Stargate Atlantis	Wench	Episode: "Irresponsible"
2007	Nuclear Hurricane	Susan	Television film
2008	Paradise Falls	Kate Banning	15 episodes
2009	Eureka	Dr. Bell	Episode: "Shower the People"
2011	He Loves Me	Alix	Television film
2011	The Haunting Hour: The Series	Instructor	Episode: "Pool Shark"
2011	Supernatural	Sue	Episode: "Shut Up, Dr. Phil"
2012	Fringe	Diane Mallum	Episode: "Forced Perspective"
2013	Let It Snow	Tara	Television film
2013	Played	Katie Dewar	Episode: "Untouchables"
2014	A Day Late and a Dollar Short	Detective Corelli	Television film
2015	Murder, She Baked	Danielle Watson	Episode: "A Chocolate Chip Cookie Mystery"
2015	Unreal	Lydia	Episode: "Future"
2015	Ties That Bind	Jackie	4 episodes
2016	A Wife's Suspicion	Morgan Knox	Television film
2017	When We Rise	NOW Organizer	Episode: "Night I: Part I"
2020	Mrs. America	Ms. Senior Editor	Episode: "Betty"
