= Scott Simpson (filmmaker) =

Canadian film and television director

Scott Simpson (born August 22, 1972) is a Canadian film and television director based in Halifax, Nova Scotia. He is most noted for his 1998 short film December 1917, which was a Gemini Award nominee for Best Short Drama at the 14th Gemini Awards in 1999, and his 2002 feature film Touch & Go.

He has also directed the short films Back of the House (2003) and The Toll (2015), but has concentrated primarily on directing television documentaries and music videos for Nova Scotia artists. He has also served on the executive of Screen Nova Scotia, the trade association for the film and television industry in Nova Scotia.
