= Touch & Go (2002 film) =

Canadian comedy film

- Directed by: Scott Simpson
- Written by: Michael Melski
- Produced by: Craig Cameron; Graeme Gunn; Scott Simpson
- Starring: Jeff Douglas; Patricia Zentilli; Elliot Page (Note: Credited as Ellen Page; Page came out as transgender and changed his name in 2020.)
- Cinematography: David Greene
- Edited by: Scott Simpson
- Music by: The Heavy Blinkers
- Production company: Chronicle Pictures
- Release date: September 2002 (AIFF)
- Running time: 103 minutes
- Country: Canada
- Language: English

Touch & Go is a Canadian comedy film, directed by Scott Simpson and released in 2002. The film stars Jeff Douglas as Darcy, a young man in his early 20s working as a tour guide in Halifax, whose ambivalent attitude toward becoming an adult is challenged when his friends Lynn (Patricia Zentilli) and Peter (Stephen Sharkey) announce plans to move away for Lynn's career.

The cast also includes Elliot Page in a small role as a skateboarder, as well as Cassie MacDonald, Glen Michael Grant, Karen Beverly, Kevin Curran, Joseph Rutten, Gordon Gammie, Andy Smith, Krista MacDonald, Anaïs Guimond, Mark Owen, Linda Busby and Robert D. Morais in supporting roles.

Shot in Halifax in 2001, the film premiered at the 2002 Atlantic International Film Festival.

== Reception ==
The film was reviewed by Variety who said it had "a light helming touch, a breakout lead performance … neatly shot with a quirky, original style."

After many years of being difficult to locate, the film was screened at the inaugural edition of the Nova Scotia Retro Film Festo in January 2025.
