= Matthias Müller (filmmaker) =

German filmmaker (born 1961)

Matthias Müller (2026)

Matthias Müller (born 1961 in Bielefeld) is a German experimental filmmaker and curator, often working in the field of found footage films.

== Biography ==
From 1994 to 1997 he worked as guest professor at the Goethe University Frankfurt, and from 1998 to 1999 at the Dortmund Fachhochschule. Since 2003 he is professor for experimental film at the Academy of Media Arts (KHM), Cologne, Germany. For his films he has received numerous awards from many international festivals, including the American Federation of Arts Experimental Film Award in 1988, the Golden Gate Award at the San Francisco International Film Festival in 1996, the main award at the Internationale Kurzfilmtage Oberhausen in 1999, the Ken Burns “Best of the Festival“ Award at the Ann Arbor Film Festival in 2003, the German Short Film Prize for Animation in 2006 (with Christoph Girardet), the Prix Canal+ du meilleur court métrage at the Cannes Film Festival in 2006 (with Christoph Girardet), and the Premio Principado de Asturias al Mejorcortometraje at the Gijón International Film Festival in 2011 (with Christoph Girardet). In 1990, 1997, and in 2000 he gained the "Preis der Deutschen Filmkritik". Both Vacancy and Cut were nominated for the European Film Award. Müller's work has also been featured in several group and solo exhibitions in institutions such as Tate Modern, London, Hayward Gallery, London, Migros Museum für Gegenwartskunst, Zurich, Palais de Tokyo, Paris, Centre Pompidou, Paris, Hangar Bicocca, Milan, and Museo Tamayo, Mexico City.

== Films ==
- Aus der Ferne – The Memo Book (1989)
- Home Stories (1990)
- Sternenschauer (Scattering Stars, 1994)
- Sleepy Haven (1994)
- Alpsee (1995)
- Pensão Globo (1997)
- Vacancy (1998)
- Phoenix Tapes (2000, together with Christoph Girardet)
- Breeze (2000)
- Nebel (Fog, 2000)
- Phantom (2001/2)
- Manual (2002, together with Christoph Girardet)
- Beacon (2002, together with Christoph Girardet)
- Play (2003, together with Christoph Girardet)
- Mirror (2003, together with Christoph Girardet)
- Album (2004)
- Kristall (2006, together with Christoph Girardet)
- Hide (2006, together with Christoph Girardet)
- Locomotive (2008, together with Christoph Girardet)
- Contre-jour (2009, together with Christoph Girardet)
- Maybe Siam (2009, together with Christoph Girardet)
- Meteor (2011, together with Christoph Girardet)
- Cut (2013, together with Christoph Girardet)
- personne (2016, together with Christoph Girardet)
- Air (2016)
