= Tom (2002 film) =

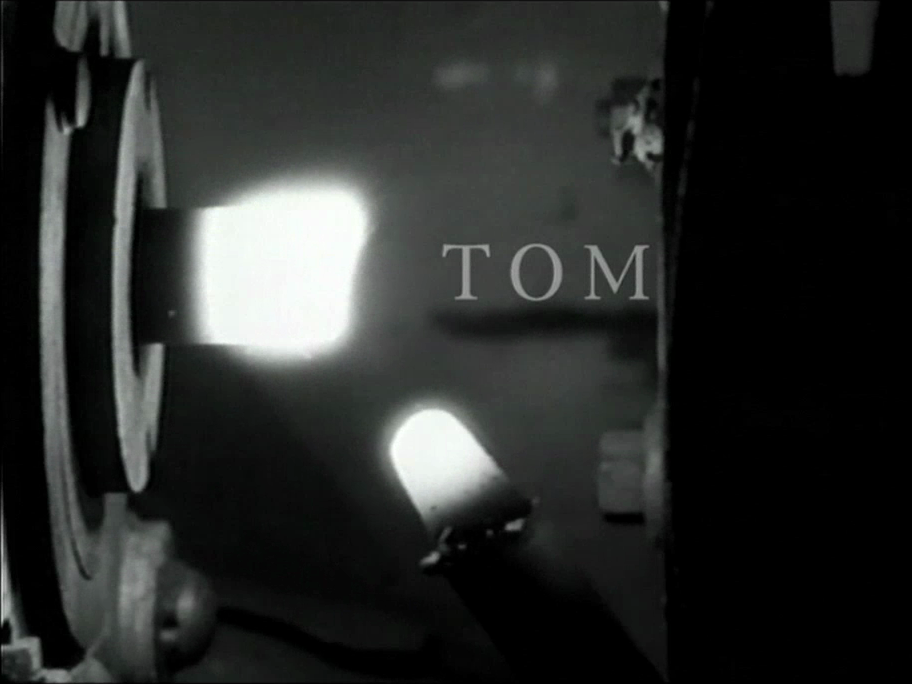
- Directed by: Mike Hoolboom
- Produced by: Mike Hoolboom
- Starring: Tom Chomont
- Cinematography: Mike Hoolboom; Caspar Strackle
- Edited by: Mark Karbusicky
- Release date: September 12, 2002 (TIFF)
- Running time: 75 minutes
- Country: Canada
- Language: English

Tom is a Canadian documentary film, directed by Mike Hoolboom and released in 2002. The film is a portrait of underground filmmaker Tom Chomont.

The film premiered at the 2002 Toronto International Film Festival.

The film was named to the Toronto International Film Festival's year-end Canada's Top Ten list for 2002.
