= Flux (film) =

- Directed by: Christopher Hinton
- Written by: Christopher Hinton
- Produced by: Marcy Page
- Edited by: Hannele Halm
- Music by: Lance Neveu
- Animation by: Christopher Hinton
- Production company: National Film Board of Canada
- Release date: June 2002 (Annecy)
- Running time: 8 minutes
- Country: Canada

Flux is a Canadian animated short film, directed by Christopher Hinton and released in 2002. The film presents a fast-paced, humorous summary of life, from birth to death, in eight minutes.

The film premiered at the 2002 Annecy International Animation Film Festival, where it won the FIPRESCI critics' prize. It had its Canadian premiere in August at the Montreal World Film Festival, and was later screened at festivals including the 2002 Toronto International Film Festival and the 2002 Ottawa International Animation Festival.

At Ottawa, it won the award for best narrative short film. The film was a Jutra Award nominee for Best Animated Short Film at the 5th Jutra Awards in 2003.
