= Jeff Douglas =

Canadian actor and broadcaster

- Born: Jeffrey Lloyd Douglas; June 8, 1971 (age 55); Truro, Nova Scotia, Canada
- Occupations: Actor, broadcaster
- Years active: 1999–present

Jeffrey Lloyd Douglas (born June 8, 1971) is a Canadian actor and broadcaster, best known as the cohost of CBC Radio One's daily news program As It Happens from 2011 to 2019. He has hosted the mainland Nova Scotia afternoon show Mainstreet since June 2019.

== Early life ==
Douglas was born in Truro, Nova Scotia. He obtained a Bachelor of Science degree from Dalhousie University in 1993.

== Career ==
He first rose to prominence for his role as Joe Canada in Molson's ad The Rant. He appeared in a new version of "The Rant" in 2025, directly addressing Donald Trump's trade war and threats to annex Canada as the 51st state of the United States.

In 2002, he starred in the film Touch & Go.

As a presenter, Douglas has starred in the series Things That Move (History, NatGeo Canada), Working Over Time (History), and Ancestors in the Attic (History, Global). He hosted the 161 country-wide live broadcast of Jetman Live for National Geographic.

Douglas appeared as Professor Zachary in Discovery Kids' Strange Days at Blake Holsey High and as Cubby in The Famous Jett Jackson. He has received three Gemini nominations, and won the 2001 Kari Award for best performer in a television commercial.

On December 15, 2010, it was announced that Douglas would be joining Carol Off as a co-host of CBC Radio One's As It Happens, effective January 4, 2011. On April 17, 2019, he announced that he would be leaving in May 2019 to host the Mainstreet weekday afternoon show on CBHA-FM in Halifax in his home province of Nova Scotia.

In 2012, he starred as the owner of a juice bar in Mudpit. He had a short cameo in John Q, and appeared in a comedy sketch on Baroness von Sketch Show in 2018.

He was also co-host of season one of Canada's Smartest Person in 2014.
