= Michel Daeron =

French filmmaker

- Born: Paris, France
- Occupations: Filmmaker, writer, director

Michel Daeron is a film maker, writer and director.

== Background ==
Among his works is Moruroa Le Grand Secret which tells of the French nuclear tests in Moruroa and the effects of them on the people.

== Description of works ==
Atlantic Drift is about Schlomo Haendel who travels to Mauritius to find out what had happened to his father, a Jew who 50 years earlier escaped Germany and was deported to Mauritius and imprisoned there.

Unforgotten Islands is about the people of Diego Garcia. John Pilger has also made a film about the plight of the people of Diego Garcia, Stealing a Nation (2004).

Moruroa Le Grand Secret is about the French nuclear tests and the effects on the Polynesian people (Moruroa is the native Tahitian name instead of Mururoa, used by the French army)

== Filmography ==
=== Director ===
- April Moon 2.0 - 2018
- Unforgotten Islands - 2011
- Il était une île, Diego Garcia (Once Upon an Island, Diego Garcia) - 2008
- Atlantic Drift – 2002
- Bach in Auschwitz – 1999
- Les tondues de la Libération - 1995
- Contre-jour de Sibérie - 1993
- Moruroa, le grand secret (Moruroa, the Big Secret)− 1993
- April Moon over Canala - 1989

=== Writer ===
- Atlantic Drift – 2002
- Bach in Auschwitz – 1999

== Links ==
- Moruroa, le grand secret (videorecording) = Moruroa, the big secret / un film de Michel Daeron.
- Official site : Michel Daeron
