= Catherine Martin (director) =

Canadian screenwriter and film director

Catherine Martin (born 1958) is a Canadian screenwriter and film director.

Martin was born in Hull, Quebec. A graduate of the film studies program at Concordia University, she made a number of short films, including the "Shirley Bear" segment of the anthology film Five Feminist Minutes, before releasing her debut feature film Marriages (Mariages) in 2001. The film was named to the Toronto International Film Festival's annual Canada's Top Ten list for 2001, and Martin received a Genie Award nomination for Best Screenplay at the 22nd Genie Awards.

She followed up with the documentary film Ocean (Océan) in 2002, which was again named to that year's Canada's Top Ten list. In 2006 she released both the documentary film The Spirit of Places (L'Esprit des lieux) and the narrative feature film In the Cities (Dans les villes).

In 2010 she released Mourning for Anna (Trois temps après la mort d'Anna), which again made the Canada's Top Ten list for 2010.

In 2011 she collaborated with musicians Sebastien Grainger, Dan Werb and Jennifer Castle on a short film about the Mingan Archipelago National Park Reserve, as part of the National Parks Project.

She has since released the feature film Une jeune fille in 2013, and the documentary film Some of My Friends (Certains de mes amis) in 2017.
