= Letters in the Wind (film) =

- Directed by: Ali-Reza Amini
- Written by: Ali-Reza Amini; Keivan Nakhaei
- Produced by: Habiballah Kasehsaz
- Starring: Mohammad Taghi Hashemi; Faramarz Hashemzadeh
- Cinematography: Bayram Fazli
- Distributed by: Aftan Negaran Productions
- Release date: 2002 (Iran)
- Running time: 76 min
- Language: Persian

Letters in the Wind (Persian: Namehay Bad) is a 2002 critically acclaimed Iranian film. It was the directorial debut of Ali Reza-Amini.

== Storyline ==
The story of the movie follows a group of newbie recruits to the Iranian Army, and their life in boot camp. It follows the lives of two of the soldiers, Taghi and Faramarz (eponymous actors), while the rest of the cast are deliberately left anonymous. It follows one of the soldiers (Taghi) on a day's leave to Tehran after he wins a bayonet-hoisting competition. The boot camp incidents center on a cassette recording of an unknown female voice, which everyone in camp takes turns to listen to. The Tehran furlough incidents center on the soldier Taghi playing back recorded messages on the phone to the family of each of the recruits at boot camp, recording the sounds of the city on cassette, and missing connections and getting into trouble due to his social ineptness. The movie ends after showing the discovery of the tapes recorded in Tehran by camp officials, and the news of the breakup of Faramarz and his girlfriend.

== Direction ==
The movie is directed in a crisp, unemotional, documentary style of narration, with little music, with the exception of street music in Tehran, and marching music at the training camp (notably the Colonel Bogey March). Tersely made, the film is however full of candid humor.

== Controversy ==
The original 35 mm color version of the film was banned by the Government of Iran when the movie released in 2002. The movie was released in a gray tone digital version in the 2002 Toronto International Film Festival. The director based some parts of the movie on his own experiences in the Iran–Iraq War, referring to the movie as being made in the "belly of the army".

== Reviews ==
Neil Young's Film Lounge
