= Sonja Bennett =

Canadian actress (born 1980)

- Born: August 24, 1980 (age 46); Vancouver, British Columbia, Canada
- Education: Studio 58
- Occupations: Actress, screenwriter
- Years active: 2002–present
- Website: www.sonjabennett.ca

Sonja Bennett (born August 24, 1980) is a Canadian actress and screenwriter. Her film debut was in the Canadian feature film Punch (2002), for which she won the Vancouver Film Critics Circle Award for Best Actress in a Canadian Film. She has since starred in the films Donovan's Echo, Cole, Control Alt Delete, Young People Fucking, and Fido as well as the television series Godiva's and Cold Squad. In 2014, Bennett made her screenwriting debut with Preggoland, in which she also starred.

== Early life and education ==
Born in Vancouver, British Columbia on August 24, 1980, Bennett is the daughter of director and writer Guy Bennett and Anna Hart. She was raised mainly by her mother, living in several locations. She is a graduate of Garibaldi Secondary School in Maple Ridge, British Columbia. She attended the University of British Columbia for two years on an academic scholarship. Following that, she attended Studio 58 at Langara College in Vancouver. During her final year at Studio 58, a course requiring students to write and perform their own solo show gave Bennett her first experience writing material for herself, which she has described as foundational to her later screenwriting career.

== Career ==
=== Television work ===
On the small screen, Bennett played recurring roles on the NBC series Battlestar Galactica, Warner Brothers' Traveler, New Line television series Blade as well as Eureka, Dead Zone and Cold Squad. She has played guest starring roles on the series Supernatural, Stargate Atlantis, Psych, Painkiller Jane, John Doe. Bennett also had a recurring role as the character Vivian Adams in Mistresses (2015), and starred in the Bravo!/CityTV series, Godiva's from 2005-2006.

=== Film work ===
Bennett starred in the 2002 film Punch, which her father, Guy Bennett, wrote and directed. The movie was her feature film debut, premiered at the Toronto International Film Festival, and led to her being awarded Best Actress by the Vancouver Film Critics Circle. Following the film's release, Bennett was approached by Fox Television. She has since appeared in the films Donovan's Echo, Cole, Control Alt Delete, Young People Fucking, and Fido. She wrote the screenplay, her first, for the 2014 film Preggoland, in which she also starred. Following the film's release, Bennett chose to pursue television writing rather than capitalize on the film's profile in Los Angeles, describing the decision as a deliberate shift in her career ambitions. Encouraged by Vancouver writer Robert Chomiak to move from feature films into television, she began writing for the series Kim's Convenience.

== Personal life ==
Bennett was previously married to Canadian actor Stephen Lobo, with whom she has two children. The two first worked together as co-stars on Godiva's (2005–2006), in which Lobo played head chef Ramir opposite Bennett's Daisy, and the two later appeared together in the film In No Particular Order (2012). Lobo also served as an editor on Preggoland (2014). Bennett had a ten-month-old and a three-year-old during the filming of Preggoland.

== Awards and nominations ==
- In 2002 she got a 'Special Citation' in the Women In Film And Video Vancouver Artistic Merit Award category at the Vancouver International Film Festival for Punch (2002).
- In 2003 she won the Best Canadian Actress in a Lead Role of the Vancouver Film Critics Circle for Punch (2002).
- In 2005 she was nominated for a Leo Award, for Best Supporting Performance by a Female for Dramatic Series for the Godiva's episode, Having Her Cake, and for a Gemini Award for Best Performance by an Actress in a Featured Supporting Role in a Dramatic Series for Cold Squad, for the episode Righteous.
- In 2006 she was twice nominated for the Leo at the Leo Awards for Best Supporting Performance by a Female in a Dramatic Series for Godiva's (2005) for episodes Dead Flowers and Out the Door.
- In 2008 she won the award for Best Supporting Actress in a Canadian Film of the Vancouver Film Critics Circle for Young People Fucking (2007).
- In 2010 she was nominated for Best Supporting Actress in a Feature Film at the Leo Awards for Cole (2009).

== Filmography ==
=== Film ===
Year	Title	Role	Notes
2002	Dents in the Sky	Sue	Short
2002	The Water Game	Grad	
2002	Punch	Ariel	
2003	My Life Without Me	Sarah	
2003	Ferry Tale	Vicky	Short
2004	The Perfect Score	Pregnant Girl	
2005	Where the Truth Lies	Bonnie	
2005	The Fog	Mandi	
2006	Nostalgia Boy	Connie Golden	Short
2006	Fido	Tammy	
2006	Catch and Release	Caterer	
2007	he Cabinet	Lizzie	Short
2007	The Sandlot: Heading Home	Pearl	Video
2007	Shutter	Aurora	Short
2007	Young People Fucking	Mia	
2008	Elegy	Beth	
2008	Control Alt Delete	Jane	
2008	Gold! Gold! Gold!	Trina	Short
2009	Cole	Maybelline	
2010	Stained	Jennifer	
2010	Smokin' Aces 2: Assassins' Ball	Jules Scott	Video
2010	Fathers & Sons	Sonja	
2011	Pleased to Meet You	Tracy	Short
2011	Rise of the Planet of the Apes	Mother on Sidewalk	
2011	Donovan's Echo	Sarah	
2012	Random Acts of Romance	Lynn	
2012	In No Particular Order	Claire	
2014	Preggoland	Ruth	
2017	Kayak to Klemtu	Cory	

=== Television ===
Year	Title	Role	Notes
2003	John Doe	Delphine Young	Episode: "Psychic Connection"
2003	Peacemakers	Georgia	Episode: "No Excuse"
2004	Tru Calling	Beth	Episode: "The Getaway"
2004	The Dead Zone	Rachel Caldwell	Episodes: "Finding Rachel: Parts 1 & 2", "Tipping Point"
2004–2005	Cold Squad	Det. Samantha Walters	Main role
2005	Confessions of a Sociopathic Social Climber	Eliza	TV film
2005	Marker	Kim	TV film
2005	The Dead Zone	Rachel Caldwell	Episode: "Broken Circle"
2005	Masters of Horror	Dana	Episode: "Deer Woman"
2005–2006	Godiva's	Daisy	Main role
2006	Killer Instinct	Darla	Episode: "While You Were Sleeping"
2006	Stargate Atlantis	Dahlia Radim	Episode: "Coup D'etat"
2006	Blade: The Series	Vanessa	Episodes: "Descent", "The Evil Within", "Delivery"
2006	Whistler	Kate Judson	Episode: "Meltdown"
2006	Supernatural	Pamela Clayton	Episode: "Croatoan"
2007	This Space for Rent	April Melnyk	Episodes: "Stain'd", "Elvis Kwan Blows"
2007	Traveler	Maya	Episodes: "The Out", "The Tells", "The Trader"
2007	Masters of Science Fiction	Judge Pomfrey	Episode: "Jerry Was a Man"
2007	Painkiller Jane	Stacey	Episode: "Jane 113"
2007	Eureka	Callie Curie	Episodes: "Sight Unseen", "Maneater", "All That Glitters"
2008	Fear Itself	Ruthie	Episode: "In Sickness and in Health"
2008	Love to Kill (aka Fatal Kiss)	Teresa	TV film
2008	Crime Stories	Vicki	Episode: "The Slave Master"
2008	Battlestar Galactica	Specialist 2nd Class Marcie Brasko	Episode: "Revelations"
2009	Battlestar Galactica	Specialist 2nd Class Marcie Brasko	Episodes: "Sometimes a Great Notion", "Someone to Watch Over Me"
2009	Exes and Ohs	Kate	Episodes: "The Roads Previously Not Taken", "I Do. Do I?", "2.5"
2009	What Color Is Love?	Marsha Barclay	TV film
2009	Psych	Annie	Episode: "Tuesday the 17th"
2009	Held Hostage	Sandi Clark	TV film
2009	A Dog Named Christmas	Hannah McCray	TV film
2010	The Client List	Dee	TV film
2011	Hellcats	Vicky	Episode: "Fancy Dan"
2011	Gone	Liz Cook	TV film
2011	Past Obsessions	Estelle	TV film
2013	Arctic Air	Miranda	Episode: "Fool Me Once"
2015	Motive	Chelsea Richmond	Episode: "Pilot Error"
2015	Mistresses	Vivian Adams	Recurring role
2016	Supernatural	Deputy Jan Harris	Episode: "Don't Call Me Shurley"
2016	Conversations with My 2-Year Old	Lindsey's Mom	2 episodes
2016	Sunnyheart's Community Centre	Bernice	Recurring role
2017	When We Rise	Ellen	Episode: "Night II: Parts II and III"
2017	Android Employed	Sarah Morris	Episode: "The Family Unit"
2017	Ghost Wars	Karla Kowalski-Jones	Recurring role
2019	The InBetween	Taylor Hall	Episode: "While the Song Remains the Same"
2019	Charmed	Amelia	Episode: "Past Is Present"
2019	Surveillance	Linda Short	Unsold CBS pilot
2024	Law and Order Toronto: Criminal Intent	Eve Kinwood	Episode: "The Real Eve"
