= Ocean (film) =

Documentary film

- Océan
- Directed by: Catherine Martin
- Written by: Catherine Martin
- Produced by: Claude Cartier
- Cinematography: Carlos Ferrand
- Edited by: Natalie Lamoureaux
- Music by: Robert Marcel Lepage
- Production company: Les Productions Virage
- Release date: 2002
- Running time: 50 minutes
- Country: Canada
- Language: French

Ocean (French: Océan) is a Canadian documentary film, directed by Catherine Martin and released in 2002. Centred on the Océan passenger train from Montreal to Halifax, the film mixes footage from a trip on the train with interviews on the cultural and historical significance of train travel, touching particularly on themes of memory and nostalgia for past times when long-distance travel by rail was much more common than it is in the 21st century.

The film was named to the Toronto International Film Festival's annual year-end Canada's Top Ten list for 2002.
