= Ann Marie Fleming =

Canadian filmmaker

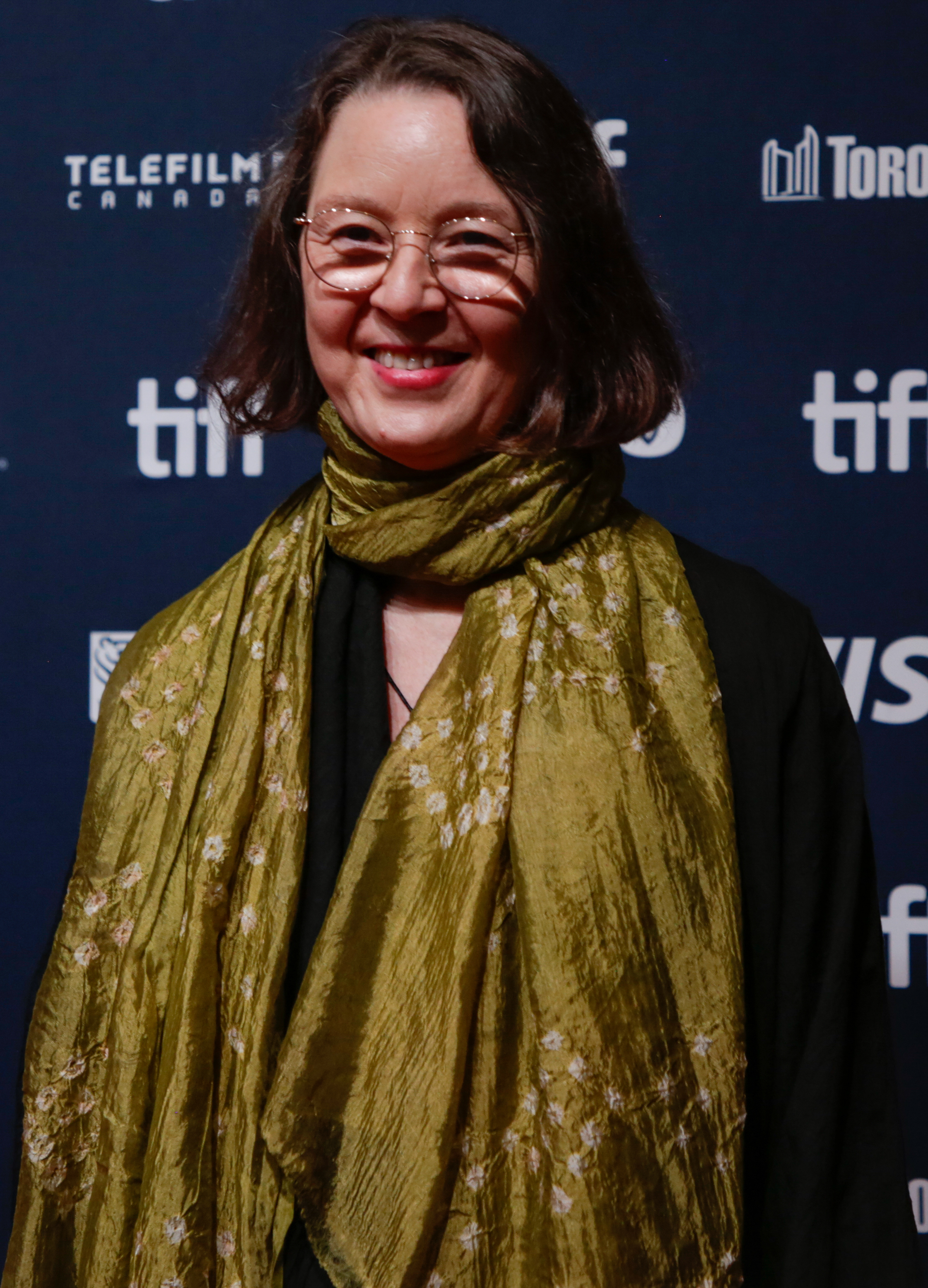
- Fleming at the 2024 TIFF
- Born: July 29, 1962 (age 63); Okinawa, Okinawa Islands, USCAR
- Education: The University of British Columbia (BA); Emily Carr Institute of Art and Design (BFA); Simon Fraser University (MFA)
- Years active: 1987-present
- Relatives: Long Tack Sam (great-grandfather)
- Website: www.sleepydogfilms.com

Ann Marie Fleming is an independent Canadian filmmaker, writer, and visual artist. She was born in Okinawa, USCAR (nowadays Japan), in 1962 and is of Chinese, Ryukyuan and Australian descent. Her film Window Horses was released in 2016.

Her animated biographical film The Magical Life of Long Tack Sam (2003) won Best Documentary at the San Diego Asian Film Festival and the Victoria Independent Film Festival. She is the great-granddaughter of the Chinese magician, acrobat and vaudeville performer Long Tack Sam.

== Background ==
Fleming has a B.A. in English (Hon) from the University of British Columbia in 1984, and with a B.F.A. (Diploma in animation) from the Emily Carr Institute of Art and Design and the Open University in 1989. Later, she did an M.F.A. at Simon Fraser University's School for the Contemporary Arts in 1992. She completed the Cineplex Entertainment Film Program Directors' Lab in 1992 and was a resident at the Canadian Film Centre (CFC) in Toronto in the same year until 1993. In the following year, she was chosen by the painter, Lawrence Weiner, to be an artist in residence at the Akademie Schloss Solitude in Stuttgart until 1995.

Fleming was a graduate film advisor at the School of the Art Institute of Chicago and co-founded Global Mechanic, an animation/film/design production house, in Vancouver. She is also the Phil Lind Multicultural Artist in residence to the University of British Columbia from October 2015 to May 2016. There, she mentors and works with students in the university's Film Production program and those from other programs who are keen on learning about filmmaking.

Fleming first emerged from the West Coast art scene in the 1980s with the likes of visual artists-turned-filmmakers like Fumiko Kiyooka, Linda Ohama and Mina Shum. Fleming and Shum met as students in 1989 and have since remained close friends. It was through Shum that she first met actress Sandra Oh in 1994. Fleming later met Oh again at the Toronto International Film Festival in 2014 and asked her to perform voice-over in and produce her animated feature, Window Horses (2016). The film is largely financed by crowdfunding through Indiegogo.

== Stick Girl ==
In her early days as an animation student in the 1980s, Fleming refused to drop out of school after sustaining injuries from a car accident. Her severely limited mobility during recovery allowed her to draw only 'tiny little gestures' which led to the creation of her iconic avatar and muse, 'Stick Girl'. Stick Girl has two slanted black lines for eyes, reflecting Fleming's Asian heritage. Fleming uses Stick Girl to represent herself in her biographical documentary, The Magical Life of Long Tack Sam (2003). Stick Girl will also play Rosie Ming (voiced by Sandra Oh), an Asian-Canadian poet with Chinese and Persian roots, in Window Horses.

== The Magical Life of Long Tack Sam (2003) ==
While recovering from the same traffic accident, Fleming acquired 16 mm film reels, home movies of her great-grandfather, the mysterious Asian magician, Long Tack Sam. Intrigued, she went to find out more about how a Chinese man could have been a successful vaudeville star during days of political strife and racial tension in the early 20th century who was, as the film later reveals, world-renowned, yet forgotten.

As a narrator and character herself in the story, Fleming traces her grandfather's footsteps all over the world, from Canada to the United States, China, England, Austria and later back to Canada. Her journey for clarity proves difficult when contradicting origin stories for Long emerge. Daniella Trimboli argues that instead of focusing on multiplicities, Fleming deconstructs the idea of singular truth by blending traditional documentary forms with her non-conventional storytelling techniques. Fleming does this by combining comic-book strips for Long's origin stories and animation of characters in old photographs with interviews, first-person narration and old footage.

The Magical Life of Long Tack Sam is part of a subgenre that Jim Lane calls the 'family portrait documentary' in which the boundaries of private and public histories intersect as the filmmaker's life interweaves with the family in focus, as an autobiography layering the biography of the family. An example of this is Fleming's profession directly affecting Long's; the movies were overtaking vaudeville in the American mainstream entertainment business. Rocio C. Davis sees the documentary as an important project and product of Asian Canadian cultural and historical revisioning, a way for Fleming to claim for her ancestor, and by extension, for herself, a place within Canada's cultural and historical narrative. Trimboli also notes that the film can be a useful tool for engaging in cosmopolitanism with its 'persistent self-reflexivity' on the ideas and themes of cultural differences, ethnic identity, and orientalism.

In 2007, Fleming made a graphic novel adaptation of the film which won the Doug Wright "Best Book Award" for graphic novels in 2008 and had two Eisner award nominations.

== Filmography ==
- Waving (1987)
- You Take Care Now (1989)
- New Shoes: an interview in exactly 5 minutes (1990) — a segment of movie Five Feminist Minutes
- Pioneers of X-Ray Technology (1991)
- So Far So... (1992)
- It's Me, Again (1993)
- Buckingham Palace (1993)
- La Fabula della bella Familia auf du World (1993)
- My Boyfriend Gave Me Peaches (1994)
- I Love My Work (1994)
- Pleasure Film (Ahmed's Story) (1995)
- Automatic Writing (1996)
- Great Expectations: not what you're thinking (1997)
- AMF's Tiresias (1998)
- One & Only (1999)
- Hysterical: the musical (2000)
- Lip Service: a mystery (2001)
- Aguas de Março (2002)
- Blue Skies (2002)
- The Magical Life of Long Tack Sam (2003)
- Room 710 (2005)
- The French Guy (2005)
- My Obscure Object of Desire (2006)
- Running (2008)
- Landslide (2008)
- My Place webisodes (2009)
- Window Horses Karaoke Project (2009)
- I Was a Child of Holocaust Survivors (2010)
- Gluttony (2011)
- Big Trees (2013)
- Window Horses (2016)
- Vancouver April 2020 18:59:30 PT (2020)
- Can I Get a Witness? (2024)
