= 13th Genie Awards =

1992 Canadian film awards ceremony

- Date: November 22, 1992
- Site: Metro Toronto Convention Centre, Toronto, Ontario
- Hosted by: Leslie Nielsen

Highlights
- Best Picture: Naked Lunch
- Most awards: Naked Lunch (8)
- Most nominations: Naked Lunch (11)

Television coverage
- Network: CBC Television

The 13th annual Genie Awards were held on November 22, 1992, to honour Canadian films released in late 1991 and 1992. They were dominated by David Cronenberg's Naked Lunch, Jean-Claude Lauzon's Léolo, and Jean Beaudin's Being at Home with Claude.

The academy now recognized that its annual ceremony was not attracting audiences in Quebec. It worked with Radio-Canada to produce a French-language special, hosted by Quebec journalist René Homier-Roy, that aired immediately after the main broadcast and presented viewers with film clips and winner and nominee interviews.

The ceremony was held at the Metro Toronto Convention Centre in Toronto. Actor John Candy was slated to host the event, but he pulled out in a dispute over advance advertising which he had not approved and which he perceived as making fun of his weight. Actor Leslie Nielsen stepped in as host and received a standing ovation.

== Award winners and nominees ==
Motion Picture	Direction
Naked Lunch — Gabriella Martinelli, Jeremy Thomas; Being at Home with Claude — Louise Gendron; Léolo — Aimée Danis, Lyse Lafontaine; Requiem for a Handsome Bastard (Requiem pour un beau sans-coeur) — Nicole Robert, Lorraine Dufour; The Saracen Woman (La Sarrasine) — Marc Daigle, Lise Abastado	David Cronenberg, Naked Lunch; Eli Cohen, The Quarrel; Jean Beaudin, Being at Home with Claude; Jean-Claude Lauzon, Léolo; Robert Morin, Requiem for a Handsome Bastard (Requiem pour un beau sans-coeur)
Actor in a leading role	Actress in a leading role
Tony Nardi, The Saracen Woman (La Sarrasine); Jacques Godin, Being at Home with Claude; Don McKellar, Highway 61; Gildor Roy, Requiem for a Handsome Bastard (Requiem pour un beau sans-coeur); Peter Weller, Naked Lunch	Janet Wright, Bordertown Café; Janet-Laine Green, The Shower; Viveca Lindfors, North of Pittsburgh; Enrica Maria Modugno, The Saracen Woman (La Sarrasine); Valerie Pearson, Solitaire
Actor in a supporting role	Actress in a supporting role
Michael Hogan, Solitaire; Jean-Guy Bouchard, Requiem for a Handsome Bastard (Requiem pour un beau sans-coeur); Tano Cimarosa, The Saracen Woman (La Sarrasine); Robbie Coltrane, Oh, What a Night; Andrew Miller, Oh, What a Night	Monique Mercure, Naked Lunch; Krista Bridges, The Shower; Judy Davis, On My Own; Tracey Moore, Defy Gravity; Johanne-Marie Tremblay, The Saracen Woman (La Sarrasine)
Original Screenplay	Adapted Screenplay
Jean-Claude Lauzon, Léolo; Francis Damberger, Solitaire; Paul Donovan and William Fleming, Buried on Sunday; Bruno Ramirez and Paul Tana, The Saracen Woman (La Sarrasine); Jeff Schultz, North of Pittsburgh	David Cronenberg, Naked Lunch; David Brandes, The Quarrel; Jacques Leduc and Yvon Rivard, Phantom Life (La Vie fantôme); Kelly Rebar, Bordertown Café; Gail Singer, True Confections
Best Feature Length Documentary	Best Short Documentary
Deadly Currents — Ric Esther Bienstock, Simcha Jacobovici, Elliott Halpern; The Steak (Le Steak) — Manon Leriche, Pierre Falardeau; Wisecracks — Gail Singer, Signe Johansson	A Song for Tibet — Anne Henderson, Abby Jack Neidek, Kent Martin; A Kind of Family — Andrew Koster; Xénofolies — Michel Moreau
Best Live Action Short Drama	Best Animated Short
Battle of the Bulge — Arlene Hazzan Green; Kumar and Mr. Jones — Leonard Farlinger, Paul Brown; Stroke — Mark Sawers, Gregory Middleton	Strings — Wendy Tilby; Blackfly — Christopher Hinton; The Lump — John Weldon
Art Direction/Production Design	Cinematography
Carol Spier, Naked Lunch; Andris Hausmanis, True Confections; Louise Jobin, Phantom Life (La Vie fantôme); François Séguin, Being at Home with Claude; François Séguin, Léolo; François Séguin, The Saracen Woman (La Sarrasine)	Peter Suschitzky, Naked Lunch; Michel Caron, The Saracen Woman (La Sarrasine); Guy Dufaux, Léolo; Pierre Mignot, Phantom Life (La Vie fantôme); Thomas Vámos, Being at Home with Claude
Costume Design	Editing
François Barbeau, Léolo; Alisa Alexander, True Confections; François Barbeau, The Saracen Woman (La Sarrasine); Denise Cronenberg, Naked Lunch; Michèle Hamel, Phantom Life (La Vie fantôme)	Michel Arcand, Léolo; André Corriveau, Being at Home with Claude; Bruce Lange, North of Pittsburgh; Lara Mazur, Bordertown Café; Michael Pacek, Highway 61
Overall Sound	Sound Editing
Peter Maxwell, Bryan Day, David Appleby and Don White, Naked Lunch; Yvon Benoît, Jo Caron, Jack Jullian and Hans Peter Strobl, Léolo; Jo Caron, Michel Descombes, Michel Charron and Luc Boudrias, Being at Home with Claude; Dean Giammarco, Patrick Ramsay, Paul A. Sharpe and Bill Sheppard, North of Pittsburgh; John Martin, Don White, Lou Solakofski and David Appleby, South of Wawa	Richard Cadger, Wayne Griffin, David Evans, Jane Tattersall, Andy Malcolm and Tony Currie, Naked Lunch; Jérôme Décarie, Mathieu Beaudin, Carole Gagnon and Marcel Pothier, Being at Home with Claude; Jérôme Décarie, Diane Boucher, Michel Bordeleau, Francine Poirier and Claude Beaugrand, Phantom Life (La Vie fantôme); Charles O'Shea, Shane Shemko, Cal Shumiatcher, Alison Grace and Marti Richa, North of Pittsburgh; Marcel Pothier, Jean-Pierre Lelong, Richard Grégoire, Mathieu Beaudin, Carole Gagnon and Jacques Plante, Léolo; Jane Tattersall, Drew King, Wayne Griffin, Tony Currie and Andy Malcolm, South of Wawa
Achievement in Music: Original Score	Achievement in Music: Original Song
Richard Grégoire, Being at Home with Claude; Michael Becker, Solitaire; Graeme Coleman, North of Pittsburgh; Pierre Desrochers, The Saracen Woman (La Sarrasine); Howard Shore, Naked Lunch	Ron Hynes, "The Final Breath" — Secret Nation; Gordon Norris and Larry Harvey, "Oh What a Fool You Made of Me" — The Shower; Cam Wagner, "Midnight Ride" — North of Pittsburgh
Special awards	
Golden Reel Award: Black Robe; Outstanding Contribution to the Canadian Film Industry: Michael Spencer	
