= Gregory Middleton =

Canadian cinematographer

- Education: University of British Columbia; John Abbott College in Québec
- Occupation: Cinematographer
- Years active: 1991–present

Gregory Middleton is a Canadian cinematographer.

He won the Genie Award for Best Cinematography at the 29th Genie Awards for his work on the film Fugitive Pieces.

== Filmography ==
=== Short film ===
Year	Title	Director
1992	Hate Mail	Mark Sawers
1992	Stroke (Note: Also credited as producer)	Mark Sawers
1993	Me, Mom and Mona	Mina Shum
1996	Love Taps	Annie O'Donoghue
1999	Wedding Knives	Johanna Mercer
2000	24fps	Jeremy Podeswa
2001	Mon Amour Mon Parapluie	Giada Dobrzenska
2001	The Susan Smith Tapes	Jeremy Podeswa
2002	Touch	Jeremy Podeswa
2002	Lonesome Joe	Mark Sawers
2004	White Out	Matt Sinclair

Documentary short

Year	Title	Director
2009	Capturing George	Scott Smith
2010	When You Give of Yourself	Lynne Stopkewich

=== Feature film ===
Year	Title	Director
1995	Best Wishes Mason Chadwick	Mark Sawers
1996	White Tiger	Richard Martin
1996	Kissed	Lynne Stopkewich
1997	Wounded	Richard Martin
1997	The Invader	Mark Rosman
1997	The Secret Life of Algernon	Charles Jarrott
1998	Rupert's Land	Jonathan Tammuz
1998	The Falling	Raul Inglis
1999	Better Than Chocolate	Anne Wheeler
1999	The Five Senses	Jeremy Podeswa
2000	Mr. Rice's Secret	Nicholas Kendall
2000	Suspicious River	Lynne Stopkewich
2002	Between Strangers	Edoardo Ponti
2002	Punch	Guy Bennett
2003	Moving Malcolm	Benjamin Immanuel
2003	Falling Angels	Scott Smith
2004	Going the Distance	Mark Griffiths
2005	Cake	Nisha Ganatra
2006	Slither	James Gunn
2007	Fugitive Pieces	Jeremy Podeswa
2007	They Wait	Ernie Barbarash
2008	Passchendaele	Paul Gross
2009	Possession	Joel Bergvall; Simon Sandquist
2010	Gunless	William Phillips
2013	Treading Water	Analeine Cal y Mayor
2013	Make Your Move	Duane Adler
2015	Final Girl	Tyler Shields
2017	Rememory	Mark Palansky
2019	American Woman	Semi Chellas
2020	A Babysitter's Guide to Monster Hunting	Rachel Talalay

=== Television ===
TV movies

Year	Title	Director
2001	After the Harvest	Jeremy Podeswa
2001	After the Storm	Guy Ferland
2001	The Wedding Dresses	Sam Pillsbury
2006	Murder Unveiled	Vic Sarin
2009	Revolution	Michael Rymer
2009	Pulling	Elliot Hegarty

TV series

Year	Title	Director	Notes
2006	Kyle XY	Gil Junger	Episode "Pilot"
2006	Psych	Michael Engler	Episode "Pilot"
2006-2010	Smallville	Glen Winter	Episodes "Cyborg" and "Hostage"
2011	Shattered	Bobby Roth	Unaired pilot
2010-2011	Fringe	Jeffrey Hunt; Kenneth Fink; Joe Chappelle; Brad Anderson; Frederick E.O. Toye	Episodes "The Box", "Do Shapeshifters Dream of Electric Sheep?", "6955 kHz", "Entrada", "Immortality" and "Subject 13"
2012	The Killing		28 episodes; Also directed episode "Dream Baby Dream"
2013	Arrow	Glen Winter	Episode "Dead to Rights"
2014	Continuum	Will Waring	Episode "A Minute Changes Everything" and "30 Minutes to Air"
2015	Wayward Pines	Zal Batmanglij	Episodes "Our Town, Our Law" and "One of Our Senior Realtors Has Chosen to Retire"
2015-2017	Game of Thrones	Jeremy Podeswa	6 episodes
2025	Suits LA	Victoria Mahoney	Episode "Seven Days a Week and Twice on Sunday"
2026	Lanterns	Stephen Williams	Episodes "OutKast" and "Bad Optics"

Miniseries

Year	Title	Director	Notes
2019	Watchmen	Nicole Kassell; Andrij Parekh; Stephen Williams	4 episodes
2022	Moon Knight	Mohamed Diab	4 episodes
2025	Sirens	Nicole Kassell; Lila Neugebauer	3 episodes

== Awards and nominations ==
Year	Award	Category	Title	Result	Notes/Ref.
1997	Genie Awards	Best Cinematography	Kissed	Nominated	
1998	Genie Awards	Best Cinematography	The Falling	Nominated	
1999	Genie Awards	Best Cinematography	The Five Senses	Nominated	
2002	Genie Awards	Best Cinematography	Between Strangers	Nominated	
2004	Genie Awards	Best Cinematography	Falling Angels	Nominated	
2007	Genie Awards	Best Cinematography	Fugitive Pieces	Won	
2019	Genie Awards	Best Cinematography	American Woman	Nominated	
2015	Primetime Emmy Awards	Outstanding Cinematography for a Series (One Hour)	Game of Thrones	Nominated	For episode "Unbowed, Unbent, Unbroken"
2016	Primetime Emmy Awards	Outstanding Cinematography for a Series (One Hour)	Game of Thrones	Nominated	For episode "Home"
