= Chicks with Sticks =

2004 Canadian hockey film

- a.k.a. Hockey Mom, Anyone's Game
- Written by: Don Truckey
- Directed by: Kari Skogland
- Starring: Jessalyn Gilsig; Peter Outerbridge; Juliette Marquis; Michie Mee; Tanya Allen; Jason Priestley; Margot Kidder; Chantal Perron; Vanessa Holmes
- Country of origin: Canada
- Original language: English

Production
- Producers: Nancy Laing; Debbie Nightingale
- Cinematography: Paul Tolton
- Editor: Jim Munro
- Running time: 86 mins
- Production companies: Earth to Sky Pictures, The Nightingale Company
- Budget: $3.5 million

Original release
- Network: The Movie Network; Movie Central
- Release: 24 May 2004

Chicks with Sticks (also released as Hockey Mom and Anyone's Game) is a 2004 Canadian independent hockey comedy-drama television movie. It was written by Don Truckey and directed by Kari Skogland, and stars Jessalyn Gilsig, Margot Kidder, Jason Priestley, Juliette Marquis, Michie Mee and Peter Outerbridge.

Set in a small town in Alberta, the plot follows former ice hockey Olympic-hopeful Paula Taymore (Gilsig) who bets the local men's recreational-league champions that she can assemble a women's team and beat them. The film premiered on 24 May 2004 on The Movie Network and Movie Central, and was screened at the Calgary International Film Festival later that year. The film won three Rosie Awards.

== Plot ==
Paula dodges bill collectors while working and raising her young son Stewie in Red Deer, Alberta. Her brother Ross enlists her to play as a substitute in a local hockey match, helping his team to beat the league champions, the Chiefs. Afterwards, sexist comments lead Paula to wager that she can assemble an all-female team and beat the Chiefs by women's hockey rules. (Note: In comparison to men's ice hockey, the main difference with women's ice hockey is that bodychecking is not allowed. This leads to more strategic play.) She and Chiefs' captain Curt soon regret this and try to cancel the match, but it has already been announced on local radio and become the talk of the town.

With the help of her mother Edith and local DJ Heather, Paula assembles a team from the area, including destitute goalie Felicity, doctoral student Kate, soldier Brigitte, mechanic Charlene, and Calgarian Marcie. Training arguments cause Paula's commitment issues to resurface; Edith rallies the team and uses bake sale fundraising for team uniforms as the Black Widows. The Chiefs face hardships so Paula excuses them from raising matching funds. Curt bribes Ross to overlook the addition of a talented player to the Chiefs' roster, but the outsider is beaten by Felicity's friends and left unable to play. However, Marcie disappears before the match along with the prize money.

In the big match, the Chiefs take an early 3–0 lead before their momentum is broken when Kate draws a penalty against Curt and the Widows score on the power play. The Chiefs score again, which is answered by the Widows who pull their goalie to close the first period 4–2. The radio coverage draws a crowd to the arena during the intermission.

After confirming that there is betting on the match, Paula confronts Felicity in the changing room about throwing the game but refuses to pull her from the roster, insisting that the team is a family. Paula takes a heavy bodycheck to score in the second period. While recovering, she explains to Stewie that years earlier she had left the women's Olympic ice hockey team training camp because she was afraid of not making the team, and not because of him. She promises to try her hardest for what is important to her.

Both teams adopt a man-on-man defensive strategy for the third period. The Widows score on a breakaway, take the lead in the last minute, and then score an empty net goal. An executive from a national television network approaches Paula, offering the Widows a place as a founding team in a new professional women's hockey league. Following the post-game handshake, the Widows pose with a custom trophy dubbed the Family Cup.

== Cast ==
Cast:

- Jessalyn Gilsig as Paula Taymore
- Peter Outerbridge as Curt Bonner
- Juliette Marquis as Felicity Carelli
- Michie Mee as Heather Desmond
- Tanya Allen as Kate Willings
- Jason Priestley as Steve Cooper
- Margot Kidder as Edith Taymore, Paula's mother
- Andrew Chalmers as Stewart "Stewie" Taymore
- Pascale Hutton as Charlene Manski
- Kevin James Kruchkywich as Ross Taymore
- Brad Turner as Vic Duguay
- Kurtis Sanheim as Jimmy
- Andrew Krivanek as Dale
- Shaun Johnston as Luke
- Valerie Pearson as Doris
- Chantal Perron as Brigitte Peron
- Vanessa Holmes as Brenda Pullman
- Natassia Malthe as Marcie Rutledge
- Colin A. Campbell as Brent
- Chris Lozanski as Garrett
- Ron Stern as Ringer
- Sherry Lynn Friesen as Vic's Wife
- Brandon Firla as Alex Perkins
- Dee Bateman as Coach
- Beverley Mahood as Singer At Dance

Turner and Stern are retired National Hockey League players.

== Writing and development ==
The film was written by Don Truckey. Some of the characters are based on girls that he knew while growing up in Westlock, Alberta, as the son of a high-school gym teacher. The project was initially called Paula's Power Play, and Paula played one game in a men's league as a substitute player, dazzling everyone with her skill which led to the challenge.

Truckey's script attracted little interest – the sports film genre being dominated by formulaic American productions – until early 2002 when two things occurred: Men with Brooms was a minor hit and Canadian women won Olympic gold for hockey. A production deal was made under the working title Chicks with Sticks, with plans to present the film on pay television during the 2003–04 hockey season.

Studying the women's play in the Olympic games, the filmmakers realized that female players approached hockey differently, with more passing and less shooting. Rather than the original idea of taking on the men's team at their own game, the filmmakers changed the story so that the men are forced to adjust to the women's pace.

Gilsig immediately wanted the role on receiving the script. Describing herself as a "huge hockey fan" from a hockey household, she had played ringette and undertook daily training in preparation. Kidder, a hockey mom and grandmom who played pick-up hockey as a girl, also took quickly to the script.

== Production ==
With a budget of $3.5 million, the film was produced by Nancy Laing of Alberta-based Earth to Sky Pictures and Debbie Nightingale of the Toronto-based Nightingale Company, with co-producer Christina Willings. Directed by Kari Skogland, the movie was filmed in November and December 2003, in Okotoks, outside of Calgary, Alberta. Some filming was done at the Sarcee Seven Chiefs Sportsplex on the Tsuu T'ina Nation west of Calgary. The hockey scenes were shot late at night, which was the only time an arena was available during peak hockey season. Nightingale credited director of photography Paul Tolton for filming action sequences while "bobbing, weaving and crouching" on skates, often on a 12-hour shooting schedule.

Eight stunt performers were recruited from Calgary's Mount Royal College Cougars women's ice hockey team, which had won the previous year's provincial college conference. Other female hockey players were recruited from Calgary's Olympic Oval Extreme team and from Edmonton.

The picture was edited by Jim Munro and has a running time of 86 minutes.

== Release ==
Chicks with Sticks premiered as a television movie on 24 May 2004 on The Movie Network and Movie Central.

The television movie had its theatrical premiere at the Calgary International Film Festival (CIFF), where it was screened on 27 September 2004 at the Globe Cinema.

The film was released in the United States on streaming services in October 2005.

In 2005, the film was released on DVD by Kaboom Entertainment in Canada under the title Anyone's Game (Enjeux sur glace in French) and by Monarch Home Video in the US as Hockey Mom.

== Reception ==
=== Critical response ===
In 2011, Joe Iannello of Bleacher Report listed Chicks with Sticks as the No. 9 hockey movie of all time, writing that the often-underrated film has a great battle-of-the-sexes story and good sports scenes. Jim Bawden of the Toronto Star recommended the film and called it "an excellent example of Canadian independent filmmaking".

=== Awards ===
The film won three Rosie Awards from the Alberta Media Production Industries Association: Best Drama (over 60 minutes), Best Actor to Kevin Kruchkywich, and Best Actress to Chantal Perron.
