= David Lewis (Canadian actor) =

Canadian actor (born 1976)

- Born: 4 August 1976 (age 49); Vancouver, British Columbia, Canada
- Occupation: Actor
- Years active: 1983–present
- Children: 1

David Lewis (born 4 August 1976) is a Canadian actor, best known for his roles in Hope Island, Icarus, White Chicks, A Fairly Odd Movie: Grow Up, Timmy Turner, Dirk Gently's Holistic Detective Agency, and Child's Play.

== Career ==
Lewis is best known for playing Kevin Mitchum on the PAX series Hope Island. He played Walt Lawson in the 1999 film Lake Placid, and also worked in The Butterfly Effect 2. Lewis played Richard Allen on CBS's Harper's Island. In 2010, he played Mr. Graham in Icarus. Lewis has had a role in over 200 movies and shows. In 2005, he appeared on Criminal Minds. He starred in Shoes Off!, which was a Genie Award nominee for Best Live Action Short Drama in 1998. He also played Mr. Denzel Crocker in the 2011 television film A Fairly Odd Movie: Grow Up, Timmy Turner, the 2012 TV movie, A Fairly Odd Christmas, and the 2014 TV movie, A Fairly Odd Summer.

He was cast in Dirk Gently's Holistic Detective Agency in 2016 as FBI Agent Weedle. As the series was filmed in Vancouver, his co-stars included an assortment of local talent, including Michael Eklund, Zak Santiago, Viv Leacock, and Osric Chau. In 2019, Lewis was cast in the horror film Child's Play as Shane, a character who is depicted as mean and abusive towards his girlfriend's son Andy (Gabriel Bateman). He was interviewed by Dread Central about his role in the film. In 2015, Lewis has been awarded a Leo award for the Best Performance by a Male in a Web Series.

== Personal life ==
Lewis revealed in his 2019 interview that he has children, including at least one son.

== Filmography ==
=== Film ===
Year	Title	Role	Notes
1985	Morons from Outer Space	Policeman	
1988	Tales from the Gimli Hospital	Gimli Manfolk / Patient	
1995	Hollywood Dreams Take 2	Stan	
1997	Laws of Deception	Bob, Car Rental Clerk	
1997	The F-Zone	Library Patron	
1998	Air Bud: Golden Receiver	Herb	
1998	Shoes Off!	Stuart	
1999	Lake Placid	Walt Lawson	
1999	Limp	Ian	
2000	MVP: Most Valuable Primate	Organist	
2001	The Proposal	Bartender	
2002	D-Tox	Jeweler	
2002	Liberty Stands Still	Businessman	
2002	Slap Shot 2: Breaking the Ice	Rick Cooper	Direct-to-video
2002	K-9: P.I.	Jack Von Jarvis	Direct-to-video
2002	Halloween: Resurrection	Bob Green	
2002	Debating Christ	Tom	
2003	See Grace Fly	Gerry the Postman	
2003	Paycheck	Suit	
2003	How It All Went Down	Andy	
2004	The Final Cut	Dad	
2004	White Chicks	Josh	
2005	Edison	Mr. Crow	
2005	The Long Weekend	Ed's Friend	
2006	Firewall	Rich	
2006	Alien Incursion	Stevie	
2006	The Butterfly Effect 2	Dave Bristol	
2006	Deck the Halls	Ted	
2007	Code Name: The Cleaner	Man in Car	
2007	Martian Child	Leonard	
2007	Locked Out	Lorne	
2008	Girlfriend Experience	Daniel	
2008	The Day the Earth Stood Still	Plainclothes Agent	
2009	Helen	Dr. Barnes	
2009	Personal Effects	Brice	
2009	Zombie Punch	Tyler	
2009	Possession	Father David	
2010	Icarus	Mr. Graham	
2010	Guido Superstar: The Rise of Guido	Jesse Jack	
2011	Donovan's Echo	Kit	
2011	The Big Year	Lanky Birder	
2012	The Company You Keep	Albany FBI Agent Lewis	
2012	Camera Shy	Detective Duvall	
2013	Man of Steel	Major Laramore	
2013	Words and Pictures	Tom	
2013	Evangeline	Mr. K	
2014	Bad City	John Johnderson	
2015	No Men Beyond This Point	1950s Business Man	
2015	The Marine 4: Moving Target	Officer Scott	Direct-to-video
2015	Hidden	Breather Lieutenant	
2016	The Cleanse	Terry	
2016	Candiland	Don	
2017	The Cannon	Joseph	
2017	7 from Etheria	Alex	
2018	Violentia	Dr. Adam Anderson	
2018	How It Ends	Wagoneer Man	
2018	The Prodigal Dad	Jasper	
2018	Bloody Bits: Shorts Compilation Vol. 2	Dad	
2019	A Dog's Way Home	Hiker	
2019	Child's Play	Shane	
2019	The Art of Racing in the Rain	Prosecutor	
2019	Shevenge	Edward	
2020	All Joking Aside	Pete	
2020	The Curse of Willow Song	Harold	
2021	There's Someone Inside Your House	Mr. Pace	

=== Television ===
Year	Title	Role	Notes
1983	Copper Mountain	Drummer	Television film
1992	The Comrades of Summer	Marine Pitcher	Television film
1993–1995	The X-Files	Young Agent / Vosberg / Young Officer	3 episodes
1994	Love on the Run	Ranger	Television film
1995	Falling from the Sky: Flight 174	Frank Farr	Television film
1995	Beauty's Revenge	Officer	Television film
1995	Madison	Eric	Episode: "Can't Get No Satisfaction"
1996	Abducted: A Father's Love	Orderly	Television film
1996	Color Me Perfect	Dissident	Television film
1996–2001	The Outer Limits	Will Carson / Joe Oakridge / Deputy	3 episodes
1997	A Child's Wish	Rick	Television film
1997	Breaking the Surface: The Greg Louganis Story	Officer #1	Television film
1998	Loyal Opposition: Terror in the White House	Airplane Security Man #2	Television film
1998	Voyage of Terror	Ned Simon	Television film
1998	Every Mother's Worst Fear	Bruce	Television film
1998	The Net	Billy	Episode: "Jump Vector"
1998	The New Addams Family	Hubert Peterson	Episode: "New Neighbors Meet the Addams Family"
1999	Millennium	FBI Technician	Episode: "Collateral Damage"
1999	Da Vinci's Inquest	Red-Headed Man	2 episodes
1999	Lexx	Fruitcake	Episode: "Patches in the Sky"
1999	Dead Man's Gun	Arch Friggins	Episode: "A Just Reward"
1999	Fatal Error	Ned Henderson	Television film
1999–2000	Hope Island	Kevin Mitchum	22 episodes
2000	Higher Ground	Sam	Episode: "Walking the Line"
2000	The Linda McCartney Story	Danny Field	Television film
2000	Level 9	Justin Taylor	Episode: "A Price to Pay"
2000	Special Delivery	Jack Beck	Television film
2001	The Wedding Dress	Joan's Lawyer	Television film
2001, 2002	Pasadena	Derek	2 episodes
2002	Jinnah on Crime: Pizza 911	Roger Sanderson	Television film
2002	Damaged Care	Dr. Avery Principle	Television film
2002	Door to Door	Peter Schaefer	Television film
2002	Tom Stone	Ed	Episode: "Cold Comfort"
2002–2003	John Doe	Stu	13 episodes
2003	Behind the Camera: The Unauthorized Story of Three's Company	Ira Denmark	Television film
2003	Dead Like Me	Dave Romain	Episode: "Pilot"
2003	The Dead Zone	Stemple	Episode: "Deja Voodoo"
2003	Alienated	Constable Cooper	Episode: "Nine One One"
2003	Jinnah: On Crime - White Knight, Black Widow	Morris Abrahms	Television film
2003, 2008	Smallville	Macy / Jeweler / Dr. Marcus	2 episodes
2004	Tru Calling	Curtis Connor	Episode: "Reunion"
2004	Behind the Camera: The Unauthorized Story of Charlie's Angels	VP of Publicity	Television film
2004	The Days	Dan Fallon	2 episodes
2004, 2005	Stargate SG-1	Cameron Balinsky	2 episodes
2005	Confessions of a Sociopathic Social Climber	Stan	Television film
2005	Behind the Camera: The Unauthorized Story of Mork & Mindy	Ira Denmark	Television film
2005	Criminal Minds	David Woodland	Episode: "Extreme Aggressor"
2006	A Job to Kill For	Seth Frankel	Television film
2006	Kyle XY	Mark	Episode: "The Lies That Bind"
2006	Totally Awesome	Agent Johnson	Television film
2006	The Accidental Witness	David Brunel	Television film
2006–2007	The L Word	Mitch	5 episodes
2007	To Be Fat like Me	Mr. Johnson	Television film
2007	Falcon Beach	Ethan Ross	Episode: "Strawberry Social Reject"
2007	Passion's Web	David Tarr	Television film
2007	Luna: Spirit of the Whale	Murray Novak	Television film
2007	Anna's Storm	Marty Durant	Television film
2007	Write & Wrong	Lev Jordanson	Television film
2007	Eureka	Dr. Aaron Finn	Episode: "Duck, Duck Goose"
2007	Zixx: Level Three	Lance Champion (2007)	Television film
2007	Christmas Caper	Brian Cooper	Television film
2008	Beyond Loch Ness	Scientist #1	Television film
2008	Making Mr. Right	Bobby	Television film
2008	The Guardian	Ted	3 episodes
2008	Gym Teacher: The Movie	Colgate Catholic Gym Teacher	Television film
2008	Ba'al	Risko	Television film
2009	Wyvern	Dr. David Yates	Television film
2009	Polar Storm	Lou Vanetti	Television film
2009	Harper's Island	Richard Allen	7 episodes
2009	The Troop	Guest Star 2009 / Ted	2 episodes
2009	Sight Unseen	Jonathan Brooks	Television film
2009	Tales of an Urban Indian	Paul	Television film
2010	Stonehenge Apocalypse	David	Television film
2010	Tower Prep	Math	Episode: "New Kid"
2011	Ghost Storm	Doug	Television film
2011	Collision Earth	Marshall Donnington	Television film
2011	Mega Cyclone	Rod	Television film
2011	The Edge of the Garden	Thomas Hargrave	Television film
2011	A Fairly Odd Movie: Grow Up, Timmy Turner!	Denzel Crocker	Television film
2011	Seeds of Destruction	Suit #1	Television film
2011	White Collar Poet	Richard Scribe	8 episodes
2012	Fringe	Brian Bauer	Episode: "The Consultant"
2012	A Killer Among Us	Detective Reed	Television film
2012	Supernatural	Professor Ludensky	Episode: "Bitten"
2012	The Eleventh Victim	Matt Leonard	Television film
2012	A Fairly Odd Christmas	Denzel Crocker	Television film
2013	Tom, Dick and Harriet	Brad	Television film
2013	Rogue Files: Reparation	Dr. Parsons	2 episodes
2014	For Better or for Worse	Logan	Television film
2014	A Fairly Odd Summer	Denzel Crocker	Television film
2014	Intruders	Simon O'Donnell	Episode: "And Here... You Must Listen"
2014	Grumpy Cat's Worst Christmas Ever	Marcus Crabtree	Television film
2014	Parked	Jesse	14 episodes
2015	Garage Sale Mysteries	Peter	Episode: "The Deadly Room"
2015	Love on the Air	Scott Ryder	Television film
2015	Monsterville: Cabinet of Souls	Mayor	Television film
2015	A Christmas Detour	Frank Harper	Television film
2015–2016	Motive	Sergeant Gavin Saunders	7 episodes
2015–2017	Girlfriends' Guide to Divorce	Mitchell	7 episodes
2016	Stop the Wedding	Jake	Television film
2016	Revenge Porn	David Harris	Television film
2016	Zoo	Dr. Vickers	2 episodes
2016	The Switch	Peter A. Flueckiger - Atlantis President	Episode: "Funemployment"
2016	Boy in the Attic	Eric Benson	Television film
2016	The Quiet Canadians: The Web Series	Bains	Episode: "Pilot"
2016	Abducted Love	Mel Davidson	Television film
2016	Travelers	Major Gleason	2 episodes
2016	Dirk Gently's Holistic Detective Agency	Agent Weedle	6 episodes
2017	The Birthday Wish	Bruce	Television film
2017	Murder, She Baked	Mason Kimball	Episode: "Murder, She Baked: Just Desserts"
2017	At Home in Mitford	Hal Owens	Television film
2017	A Joyous Christmas	David	Television film
2018	Altered Carbon	Director Nyman	Episode: "Fallen Angel"
2018	The Magicians	Dr. Walton	2 episodes
2018	The Arrangement	Vic	Episode: "The Long Game"
2018	The Good Doctor	Sam DeLeon	Episode: "Carrots"
2018–2021	Morning Show Mysteries	Lance	6 episodes
2019	Unspeakable	Lawrence Hartley	8 episodes
2019	A Feeling of Home	Carrington	Television film
2019	The InBetween	Shane Vogel	Episode: "Where the Shadows Fall"
2019	V.C. Andrews' Heaven	Cleeve VanVoreen	Episode: "Web of Dreams"
2019	Get Shorty	Mischka's Partner	2 episodes
2019	Surveillance	Wes Auburn	Television film
2020	The Neighbor in the Window	Alan	Television film
2020	Mystery 101	Dwight Merrill	Episode: "An Education in Murder"
2020	When the Streetlights Go On	Mr. Jablonski	3 episodes
2020	The Twilight Zone	Casting Director	Episode: "The Who of You"
2021	Two Sentence Horror Stories	Principal Meyers	Episode: "Elliot"
2021	When Calls the Heart	Superintendent Andrew Hargreaves	2 episodes
2021	Aurora Teagarden Mysteries	Ben Avery	Episode: "How to Con A Con"
2022	Resident Alien	Mitch Green	2 episodes
