= Naked Lunch (film) =

1991 film by David Cronenberg

- Theatrical release poster
- Directed by: David Cronenberg
- Written by: David Cronenberg
- Based on: Naked Lunch by William S. Burroughs
- Produced by: Jeremy Thomas; Gabriella Martinelli
- Starring: Peter Weller; Judy Davis; Ian Holm; Julian Sands; Roy Scheider
- Cinematography: Peter Suschitzky
- Edited by: Ronald Sanders
- Music by: Howard Shore
- Production company: Recorded Picture Company
- Distributed by: 20th Century Fox (United States); Alliance Releasing (Canada); First Independent Films (United Kingdom); Shochiku-Fuji Company (Japan)
- Release dates: 27 December 1991 (United States); 24 April 1992 (United Kingdom)
- Running time: 115 minutes
- Countries: Canada; United Kingdom; Japan
- Language: English
- Budget: $16–18 million
- Box office: $2.6 million

Naked Lunch is a 1991 surrealist science-fiction drama film written and directed by David Cronenberg and starring Peter Weller, Judy Davis, Ian Holm, and Roy Scheider. It is an adaptation of William S. Burroughs's 1959 novel Naked Lunch, and an international co-production of Canada, Britain, and Japan.

The film was released on 27 December 1991 in the United States by 20th Century Fox and 24 April 1992 in the United Kingdom by First Independent Films. It received positive reviews from critics, but was a box office flop, grossing only $2.6 million against a $17–18 million budget due to a limited release. It won numerous honours, including the National Society of Film Critics Award for Best Director and seven Genie Awards, notably Best Motion Picture. Naked Lunch has since become a cult film, acclaimed for its surrealistic visual and thematic elements.

== Plot ==
In 1953, exterminator William Lee finds that his wife Joan is stealing his insecticide to use as a recreational drug. Lee is arrested by the police, and he begins hallucinating due to exposure to the insecticide.

Lee believes he is a secret agent, and his boss, a giant talking beetle, tasks him with killing Joan, who is an agent of "Interzone Incorporated". Lee dismisses the beetle's instructions and kills it. Lee returns home to find Joan having sex with Hank, one of his writer friends. Shortly afterwards, he attempts to shoot a drinking glass off her head to emulate William Tell and accidentally kills her.

Having inadvertently accomplished his "mission", Lee flees to Tangier International Zone in North Africa. He spends his time writing reports concerning his mission; these documents are eventually compiled into the titular book.

While Lee is addicted to assorted mind-altering substances, his replacement typewriter, a Clark Nova, becomes a talking insect. It tells him to find Dr. Benway by seducing Joan Frost, a Doppelgänger of his dead wife. A row at gunpoint erupts with Joan's husband Tom, after Lee steals his typewriter, which is then destroyed by the Clark Nova insect. Lee also encounters Yves Cloquet, who is apparently an attractive, young, gay, Swiss gentleman. Lee later discovers that Yves is merely a human disguise, and that his true form is a huge, shapeshifting centipede.

Lee concludes that Dr. Benway is secretly masterminding a narcotics operation for a drug called "black meat" supposedly derived from the guts of giant Brazilian centipedes. He encounters Tom's housekeeper Fadela, previously observed to be an agent of the narcotics operation. Fadela reveals herself as Dr. Benway in disguise. After being recruited as a double agent for the black meat operation, Lee completes his report and flees Interzone to Annexia with Joan Frost.

Stopped by the Annexian border patrol and instructed to prove his claim to be a writer, Lee produces a pen, but this proves insufficient for passage. Lee, having realized that accidentally murdering his wife has driven him to become a writer, demonstrates his William Tell routine using a glass atop Joan's head. He again misses and kills Joan. The border guards cheerfully welcome him to Annexia and his new life as a writer. Lee sheds a tear at this bittersweet accomplishment.

== Cast ==
- Peter Weller as William Lee
- Judy Davis as Joan Frost / Joan Lee
- Ian Holm as Tom Frost
- Julian Sands as Yves Cloquet
- Roy Scheider as Dr. Benway
- Monique Mercure as Fadela
- Nicholas Campbell as Hank
- Michael Zelniker as Martin
- Robert A. Silverman as Hans
- Joseph Scorsiani as Kiki
- Peter Boretski as the Creatures (voice)
- Yuval Daniel as Hafid
- John Friesen as Hauser
- Sean McCann as O'Brien

== Production ==
=== Development ===
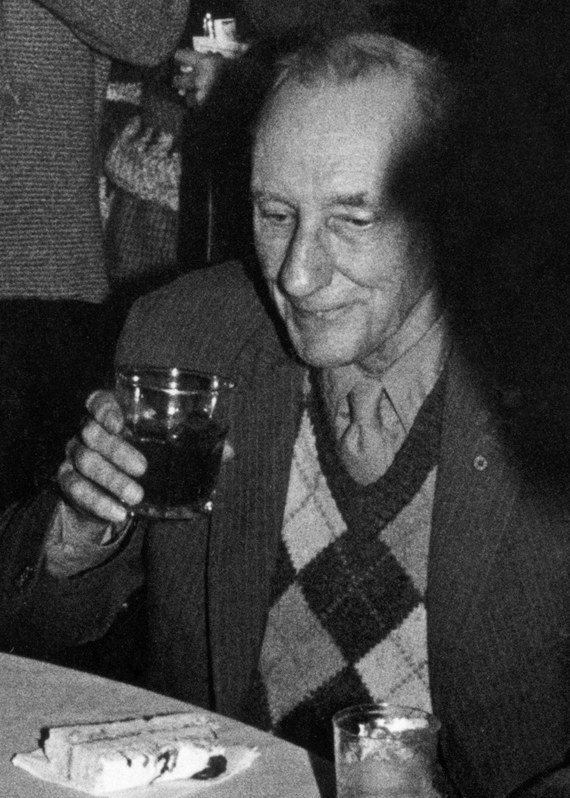
The film is based on the works of William S. Burroughs and his biography.

Filmmakers, including Stanley Kubrick and Antony Balch, using a script from Brion Gysin, attempted to adapt William S. Burroughs's Naked Lunch into a film, but were unsuccessful. In 1981, Cronenberg was interviewed by Omni during the release of Scanners in the United States and stated that he was interested in making a film based on Burroughs's novel. Producer Jeremy Thomas met Cronenberg at the 1984 Toronto Festival of Festivals and discussed making a film adaptation of the novel. Burroughs, Cronenberg, Thomas, James Grauerholz, and Hercules Bellville met in Tangiers in 1985. Grauerholz showed Cronenberg's films to Burroughs and Cronenberg stated that Burroughs felt he was the only one who could properly make the film.

The screenplay for Naked Lunch is based not only on Burroughs's novel, but also on other fiction by him, with autobiographical accounts of his life. Cronenberg said it was necessary to "Throw the book away" as a direct adaptation would have been far too expensive and "would be banned in every country in the world."

Burroughs was uninvolved with the writing of the film's script and granted his blessing to the first draft in December 1989. This version opened the film with a short story from Burroughs's Exterminator!.

The shooting of Joan Lee is based on the 1951 death of Joan Vollmer, Burroughs's common-law wife. Burroughs shot and killed Vollmer in a drunken game of "William Tell" at a party in Mexico City. He would later flee to the United States. Burroughs was convicted in absentia of homicide and sentenced to two years, which were suspended. Burroughs stated in the introduction to his book Queer that Joan's death was the starting point of his literary career, saying: "I am forced to the appalling conclusion that I would have never become a writer but for Joan's death".

The film was initially backed by Japanese investors, but they withdrew and Thomas replaced them with financing from Telefilm Canada and the Ontario Film Development Corporation.

Peter Weller, who was working on RoboCop 2, asked Mark Irwin, who worked as the cinematographer on multiple Cronenberg films, what Cronenberg was working on. Irwin told Weller that he was adapting Naked Lunch. Weller was a fan of the novel since he first read it at age 18 and had read it 10 times before learning of Cronenberg's adaptation. He stated that he pursued the lead role like "a Pac-Man".

=== Filming ===
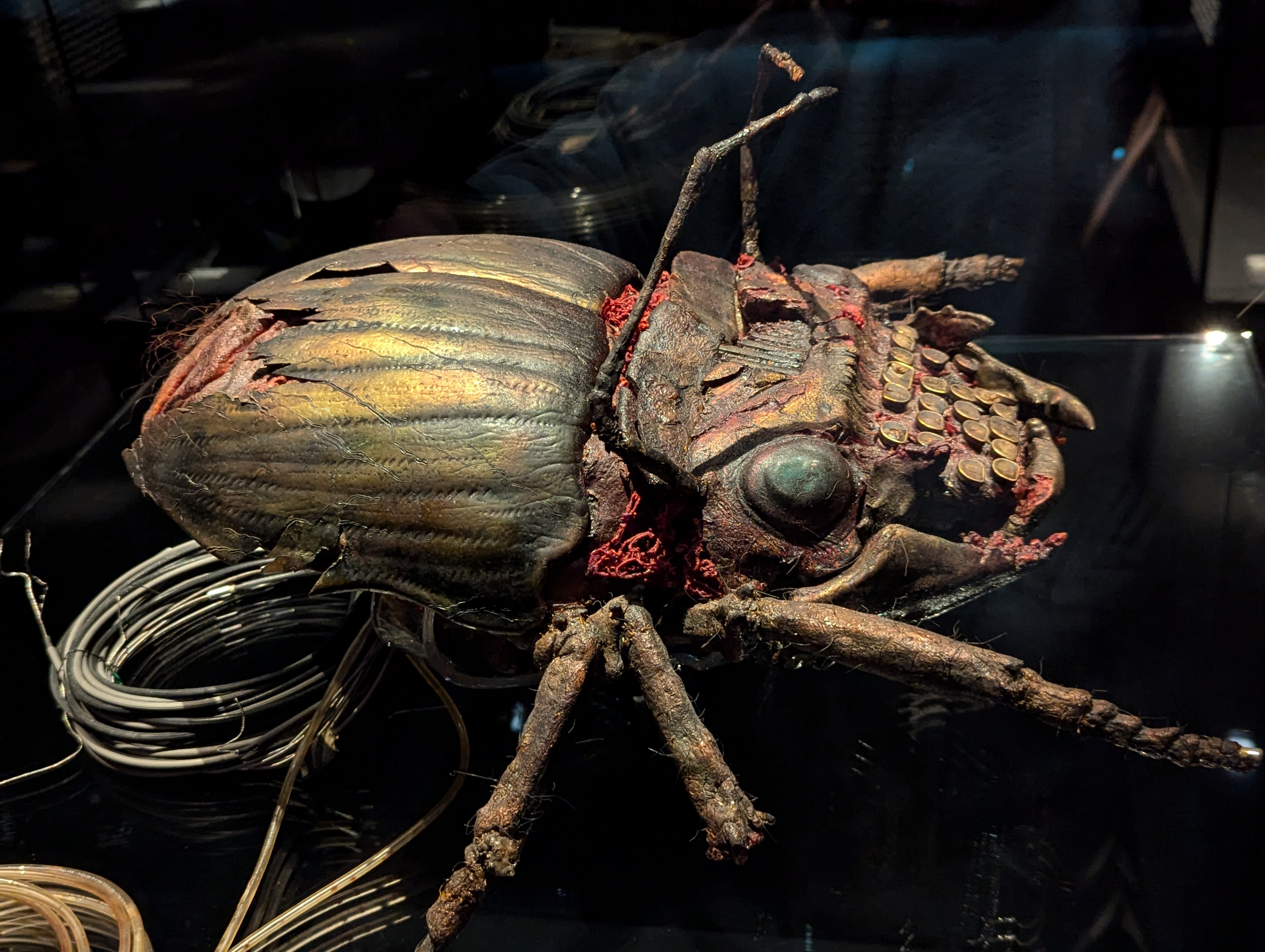
A typewriter prop on display at the Academy Museum in Los Angeles, California.

Cronenberg intended the film to be shot in Tangiers, but the Gulf War prevented him from filming in North Africa, as they could not receive insurance. Cronenberg massively rewrote the script a few days before filming due to being unable to shoot in Tangiers. Cronenberg worked on the film while also starring in Nightbreed. The film was shot on a budget of around US$17 million and shooting started on 21 January 1991 in Toronto.

Chris Walas was hired to perform the special effects for the film. The film required 50 bug typewriters.

=== Music ===
The film score is composed by Cronenberg's staple composer, Howard Shore, and features free jazz musician Ornette Coleman. The music of the Master Musicians of Jajouka led by Bachir Attar is also featured throughout the film. The use of Coleman's composition "Midnight Sunrise", recorded for his Dancing in Your Head album, is relevant, as author William S. Burroughs was present during the 1973 recording session.

== Release ==
=== Box office ===
Naked Lunch was released on 27 December 1991 in a limited release of five theaters, grossing $64,491 on its opening weekend. It went on to make $2,641,357 in North America. It was the second-highest-grossing film in Canada for 1992, behind Léolo, having earned $600,000.

=== Critical reception ===
On Rotten Tomatoes the film has a 73% rating based on 40 reviews, with an average rating of 7/10. The consensus reads, "Strange, maddening, and at times incomprehensible, Naked Lunch is nonetheless an engrossing experience." On Metacritic, it has a weighted average score of 67 out of 100 based on reviews from 16 critics, indicating "generally favorable reviews".

Roger Ebert gave the film two-and-a-half stars out of four and wrote, "While I admired it in an abstract way, I felt repelled by the material on a visceral level. There is so much dryness, death, and despair here, in a life spinning itself out with no joy". Janet Maslin of The New York Times wrote, "for the most part this is a coolly riveting film and even a darkly entertaining one, at least for audiences with steel nerves, a predisposition toward Mr. Burroughs, and a willingness to meet Mr. Cronenberg halfway", but did praise Weller's performance: "The gaunt, unsmiling Mr. Weller looks exactly right and brings a perfect offhandedness to his disarming dialogue". Richard Corliss of Time gave a mixed review, calling it "way too colorful - cute, in a repulsive way, with its crawly special effects - and tame compared with its source." In his review for the Washington Post, Desson Howe criticized what he felt to be a "lack of conviction".

Newsweek's David Ansen wrote, "Obviously this is not everybody's cup of weird tea: you must have a taste for the esthetics of disgust. For those up to the dare, it's one clammily compelling movie". Entertainment Weekly gave the film a "B+" rating with Owen Gleiberman praising Weller's performance: "Peter Weller, the poker-faced star of RoboCop, greets all of the hallucinogenic weirdness with a doleful, matter-of-fact deadpan that grows more likable as the movie goes on. The actor's steely robostare has never been more compelling. By the end, he has turned Burroughs's stone-cold protagonist – a man with no feelings – into a mordantly touching hero".

In his review for The Village Voice, J. Hoberman wrote, "Cronenberg has done a remarkable thing. He hasn't just created a mainstream Burroughs on something approximating Burroughs's terms, he's made a portrait of an American writer". Jonathan Rosenbaum in his review for the Chicago Reader wrote, "David Cronenberg's highly transgressive and subjective film adaptation of Naked Lunch ... may well be the most troubling and ravishing head movie since Eraserhead. It is also fundamentally a film about writing – even the film about writing".

Burroughs scholar Timothy S. Murphy found the film to be a muddled adaptation that reflects Cronenberg's mind more than the novel; he feels that Burroughs's subversive, allegorically political depictions of drugs and homosexuality become merely aesthetic. Murphy argues that Burroughs's social and politically situated literary techniques become in the film merely the hallucination of a junkie, and that by using the life of Burroughs himself as a framing narrative, Cronenberg turns a fragmented, unromantic, bitterly critical and satirical novel into a conventional bildungsroman.

Naked Lunch received a Criterion Collection DVD release in 2003, the first film by Cronenberg to do so.

=== Accolades ===
At the 13th Genie Awards, Naked Lunch received 11 nominations and was perceived as being in an unusually tight competition with Jean-Claude Lauzon's Léolo. The film also competed for the Golden Bear at the Berlin Film Festival.

Award	Date of ceremony	Category	Recipient(s)	Result	Ref.
Boston Society of Film Critics	26 December 1991	Best Screenplay	David Cronenberg	Won	
Genie Awards	22 November 1992	Best Motion Picture	Gabriella Martinelli and Jeremy Thomas	Won	
Genie Awards	22 November 1992	Best Direction	David Cronenberg	Won	
Genie Awards	22 November 1992	Best Adapted Screenplay	David Cronenberg	Won	
Genie Awards	22 November 1992	Best Actor	Peter Weller	Nominated	
Genie Awards	22 November 1992	Best Supporting Actress	Monique Mercure	Won	
Genie Awards	22 November 1992	Best Art Direction	Carol Spier	Won	
Genie Awards	22 November 1992	Best Cinematography	Peter Suschitzky	Won	
Genie Awards	22 November 1992	Best Costume Design	Denise Cronenberg	Nominated	
Genie Awards	22 November 1992	Best Score	Howard Shore	Nominated	
Genie Awards	22 November 1992	Best Sound	Peter Maxwell, Bryan Day, David Appleby and Don White	Won	
Genie Awards	22 November 1992	Best Sound Editing	Richard Cadger, Wayne Griffin, David Evans, Jane Tattersall, Andy Malcolm and Tony Currie	Won	
National Society of Film Critics	5 January 1992	Best Film	Naked Lunch	2nd Place	
National Society of Film Critics	5 January 1992	Best Director	David Cronenberg	Won	
National Society of Film Critics	5 January 1992	Best Screenplay	David Cronenberg	Won	
National Society of Film Critics	5 January 1992	Best Supporting Actress	Judy Davis	3rd Place	
National Society of Film Critics	5 January 1992	Best Cinematography	Peter Suschitzky	2nd Place	
New York Film Critics Circle	12 January 1992	Best Screenplay	David Cronenberg	Won	
New York Film Critics Circle	12 January 1992	Best Supporting Actress	Judy Davis	Won	

== Legacy ==
In 1994, English electronic musician Bomb the Bass released the single "Bug Powder Dust" which opens with the quote "I think it's time to discuss your, uh, philosophy of drug use as it relates to artistic endeavour" and closes with the quote "I think it's time for you boys to share my last taste of the true black meat: the flesh of the giant aquatic Brazilian centipede." The song also includes various other quotes, items and themes from the film woven into the lyrics.

In a 1996 episode of The Simpsons, "Bart on the Road", Bart, Nelson, and Milhouse use Bart's fake driver's license to get into the theatre to see an adult film. The film they choose, based on its title and R rating, is Naked Lunch. When they silently exit the theatre, Nelson looks up to the marquee and says, "I can think of at least two things wrong with that title."

== See also ==
- List of cult films
- List of films featuring hallucinogens

== Works cited ==
- Mathijs, Ernest (2008). The Cinema of David Cronenberg: From Baron of Blood to Cultural Hero. Wallflower Press. ISBN 9781905674657.
- Rodley, Chris, ed. (1997). Cronenberg on Cronenberg. Faber & Faber. ISBN 0571191371.
