= Stroke (film) =

- Directed by: Mark Sawers
- Written by: Mark Sawers
- Produced by: Mark Sawers; Gregory Middleton
- Starring: John Maclaren
- Cinematography: Gregory Middleton
- Edited by: Mark Sawers
- Music by: Don MacDonald
- Release date: 1992
- Running time: 16 minutes
- Country: Canada
- Language: English

Stroke is a Canadian short comedy-drama film, directed by Mark Sawers and released in 1992. A satire of technology, the film stars John Maclaren as a businessman who is consumed and destroyed by the technical gadgets that are supposed to make his life easier.

The film was part of a trilogy, with Hate Mail (1993) and Shoes Off! (1998).

The film was a Genie Award nominee for Best Live Action Short Drama at the 13th Genie Awards.

The film was screened in the Un Certain Regard stream at the 1993 Cannes Film Festival.
