= Hate Mail (film) =

- Directed by: Mark Sawers
- Written by: Mark Sawers
- Produced by: Chris Kelly; Mark Sawers
- Starring: Peter Outerbridge; Molly Parker
- Cinematography: Gregory Middleton
- Edited by: Mark Sawers
- Music by: Don MacDonald
- Production company: Mark Sawers Productions
- Release date: September 1, 1993 (MWFF)
- Running time: 14 minutes
- Country: Canada
- Language: English

Hate Mail is a Canadian short comedy-drama film, directed by Mark Sawers and released in 1993. The film stars Peter Outerbridge as Randall, a writer who works from home. Distracted by the constant noise from their neighbours while his wife Maggie (Molly Parker) is at work, Randall decides to forge eviction notices directed at all of them.

The film was part of a trilogy, with Stroke (1992) and Shoes Off! (1998).

It premiered at the 1993 Montreal World Film Festival.

The film was a Genie Award nominee for Best Live Action Short Drama at the 14th Genie Awards.
