= Vancouver Film Critics Circle Awards 2012 =

Annual Canadian film awards ceremony

The winners of the 13th Vancouver Film Critics Circle Awards, honoring the best in filmmaking in 2012, were announced on January 7, 2013.

== Winners and nominees ==
=== International ===
Category	Winners and nominees	Films
Best Film	Kathryn Bigelow	Zero Dark Thirty
Best Film	Paul Thomas Anderson	The Master
Best Film	Steven Spielberg	Lincoln
Best Actor	Joaquin Phoenix	The Master
Best Actor	John Hawkes	The Sessions
Best Actor	Daniel Day-Lewis	Lincoln
Best Actress	Jessica Chastain	Zero Dark Thirty
Best Actress	Marion Cotillard	Rust and Bone
Best Actress	Jennifer Lawrence	Silver Linings Playbook
Best Supporting Actor	Philip Seymour Hoffman	The Master
Best Supporting Actor	Tommy Lee Jones	Lincoln
Best Supporting Actor	Christoph Waltz	Django Unchained
Best Supporting Actress	Amy Adams	The Master
Best Supporting Actress	Anne Hathaway	Les Misérables
Best Supporting Actress	Helen Hunt	The Sessions
Best Director	Kathryn Bigelow	Zero Dark Thirty
Best Director	Ang Lee	Life of Pi
Best Director	Steven Spielberg	Lincoln
Best Screenplay	Mark Boal	Zero Dark Thirty
Best Screenplay	Tony Kushner	Lincoln
Best Screenplay	Quentin Tarantino	Django Unchained
Best Documentary	Malik Bendjelloul	Searching for Sugar Man
Best Documentary	David France	How to Survive a Plague
Best Documentary	Alison Klayman	Ai Weiwei: Never Sorry
Best Foreign Language Film	Leos Carax	Holy Motors
Best Foreign Language Film	Michael Haneke	Amour
Best Foreign Language Film	Éric Toledano and Olivier Nakache	The Intouchables

=== Canadian ===
Category	Winners and nominees	Films
Best Film	Kim Nguyen	War Witch (Rebelle)
Best Film	David Cronenberg	Cosmopolis
Best Film	Sarah Polley	Stories We Tell
Best Actor	Michael Rogers	Beyond the Black Rainbow
Best Actor	Robert Pattinson	Cosmopolis
Best Actor	Melvil Poupaud	Laurence Anyways
Best Actress	Rachel Mwanza	War Witch (Rebelle)
Best Actress	Suzanne Clément	Laurence Anyways
Best Actress	Stéphanie Lapointe	Liverpool
Best Supporting Actor	Serge Kanyinda	War Witch (Rebelle)
Best Supporting Actor	Jay Baruchel	Goon
Best Supporting Actor	Liev Schreiber	Goon
Best Supporting Actress	Sarah Gadon	Cosmopolis
Best Supporting Actress	Samantha Morton	Cosmopolis
Best Supporting Actress	Alison Pill	Goon
Best Director	Panos Cosmatos	Beyond the Black Rainbow
Best Director	David Cronenberg	Cosmopolis
Best Director	Sarah Polley	Stories We Tell
Best British Columbia Film	Panos Cosmatos	Beyond the Black Rainbow
Best British Columbia Film	Katrin Bowen	Random Acts of Romance
Best British Columbia Film	Jesse James Miller	Becoming Redwood
Best British Columbia Film	Mark Sawers	Camera Shy
Best Documentary	Nisha Pahuja	The World Before Her
Best Documentary	Peter Mettler	The End of Time
Best Documentary	Sarah Polley	Stories We Tell
