= Carolyn Dunn =

Canadian actress

- Born: 18 February 1961 (age 65); Cape Breton, Nova Scotia, Canada
- Years active: 1985–present

Carolyn Dunn is a Canadian actress. Her notable role was her portrayal of Sylvie Gerard, the business partner/sidekick on the television series Tropical Heat (1991-1993), also known as Sweating Bullets. In 1994, she starred in Thicker Than Blood: The Larry McLinden Story.In 1994, Dunn starred as Nikki Amato in the television film Thicker Than Blood: The Larry McLinden Story.

== Early life ==
She is a native of Whitney Pier on Cape Breton Island, Nova Scotia. As a child, Dunn was a figure skater and model. She then began her career as actress in the late-1970s.

== Career ==
Dunn started out playing parts of defenceless blondes in romantic movies. She became recognizable thanks to the role of Sylvie Gerard in Tropical Heat. She has appeared in several roles in television, movies, and the theater. Her last credited film role was Mary in The Death of Alice Blue in 2009.

In 2008, she returned to her home town, where she opened an alternative energy medicine clinic.

== Filmography ==
=== Film ===
Year	Title	Role	Notes
1985	Breaking All the Rules	Debbie	
1985	Head Office	Yonge's Secretary	Voice
1986	Separate Vacations	Girl #1 at Pool	
1987	Street Justice	Nancy Watson	
1990	Thick as Thieves	Lisa Hacker	
2001	Criss Cross	Sylvie Gerard	
2001	L.A.P.D.: To Protect and to Serve	Gillis	
2009	The Death of Alice Blue	Mary	

=== Television ===
Year	Title	Role	Notes
1985	Night Heat	Velvet	Episode: "Velvet"
1986	Hot Shots	Elaine	Episode: "Bluebeard's Inn"
1986	The High Price of Passion	Rhonda Benedict	Television film
1987, 1988	Street Legal	Sally Robert / BRT Client	2 episodes
1987–1989	Friday the 13th: The Series	Various roles	4 episodes
1988	Diamonds	Claudine Rogers	2 episodes
1988	Alfred Hitchcock Presents	Candi Miller / Alicia Barclay	2 episodes
1988, 1989	War of the Worlds	Sarah Cole / Debra	2 episodes
1989	The Jim Henson Hour	Rosalie	Episode: "Oceans"
1989	Bionic Showdown: The Six Million Dollar Man and the Bionic Woman	Sally	Television film
1989	Dick Francis: Blood Sport	Lynnie Teller	Television film
1989	The Hitchhiker	Michelle / Shelley	2 episodes
1990	Hitler's Daughter	Jill Breyer	Television film
1990	My Secret Identity	Dusty	Episode: "First Love"
1991–1993	Tropical Heat	Sylvie Girard	66 episodes
1993	The Hidden Room	Melanie	Episode: "Best Intentions"
1994	Highlander: The Series	Nora Fontaine	Episode: "Bless the Child"
1994	Thicker Than Blood: The Larry McLinden Story	Nikki Amato	Television film
1995	Kung Fu: The Legend Continues	Anne Carter Pendleton	Episode: "Eye Witness"
1995	Taking the Falls	Didi Dankowitz	Episode: "Easy Money"
1995–1996	Charlie Grace	Martha	4 episodes
1997	Ed McBain's 87th Precinct: Heatwave	Judy Connors	Television film
1998	Thanks of a Grateful Nation	Sally Goodnight	Television film
1998	Highlander: The Raven	Denise Grady	Episode: "Bloodlines"
1999	Earth: Final Conflict	Kimera Hologram	Episode: "Gauntlet"
1999	Total Recall 2070	Jenna Hannah	Episode: "Burning Desire"
1999	The Hunt for the Unicorn Killer	Anika Flodin	Television film
1999	Psi Factor	Dr. Caird Mitchell	Episode: "Inertia"
2000	Twice in a Lifetime	Phyllis Weaver	Episode: "Even Steven"
2000	The Pooch and the Pauper	Mary	Television film
2000	Code Name: Eternity	Susan	Episode: "Dark of Night"
2001	The Familiar Stranger	Sharon Baker	Television film
2001	Sex, Lies & Obsession	Tiffany Sheldon	Television film
2002	Doc	Beth	Episode: "All in the Family"
2002	Pretend You Don't See Her	Kitt Taylor	Television film
2002	Beware of Dog	Mary Poole	3 episodes
2003	The Reagans	Maureen Reagan	Television film
2004	Sue Thomas: F.B.Eye	Julie Meyers	Episode: "Elvis Is in the Building"
2004	Suburban Madness	Ashley	Television film
2005	Confessions of an American Bride	Nancy	Television film
2006	George Canyon's Christmas	Toque Air Rep	Television film
2006	A Dad for Christmas	Lisa	Television film
