= Valerie Pearson =

Canadian actress

Valerie Pearson is a Canadian actress from Calgary, Alberta. She is most noted for her performance in the 1991 film Solitaire, for which she received a Genie Award nomination for Best Actress at the 13th Genie Awards in 1992.

== Career ==
Pearson has been most prominently associated with stage roles in Calgary and Edmonton, including productions of Edward Connell's Welcome to Theatre Fabulous!, Giselle Lemire and Robert Astle's Mama Never Told Me That, Patricia Benedict's Good Government, Thornton Wilder's Our Town, Judith Thompson's Lion in the Streets, and Ron Chambers's Marg Szkaluba (Pissy's Wife).

== Award ==
She won an Elizabeth Sterling Haynes Award for Outstanding Actress in a Supporting Role in 1992, for Lion in the Streets.

Her other film credits have included Cowboys Don't Cry, Dead Bang, The Right Kind of Wrong, and Chicks with Sticks.

== Filmography ==
=== Film ===
Year	Title	Role	Notes
1988	Cowboys Don't Cry	Janet	
1989	Dead Bang	Helpful Person	
1991	Solitaire	Maggie	
2002	The Reckoning	Woman at Play	
2004	Chicks with Sticks	Doris	
2013	The Right Kind of Wrong	Brenda	

=== Television ===
Year	Title	Role	Notes
1991	De Zomer Van '45	Moeder van Jim	Episode #1.3
1994	While Justice Sleeps	Alma Munoz	Television film
1997	Seduction in a Small Town	Willa Jenks	Television film
1997	Honey, I Shrunk the Kids: The TV Show	Ms. Rutfield	Episode: "Honey, You're Living in the Past"
1998	Oklahoma City: A Survivor's Story	Woman at Implosion	Television film
2000	Papa's Angels	Reverend's Wife	Television film
2001	Anatomy of a Hate Crime	Martha	Television film
2003	Another Country	Magistratw	Television film
2012	The Horses of McBride	Sadie	Television film
