= Stephen O. Fuqua =

U.S. Army major general

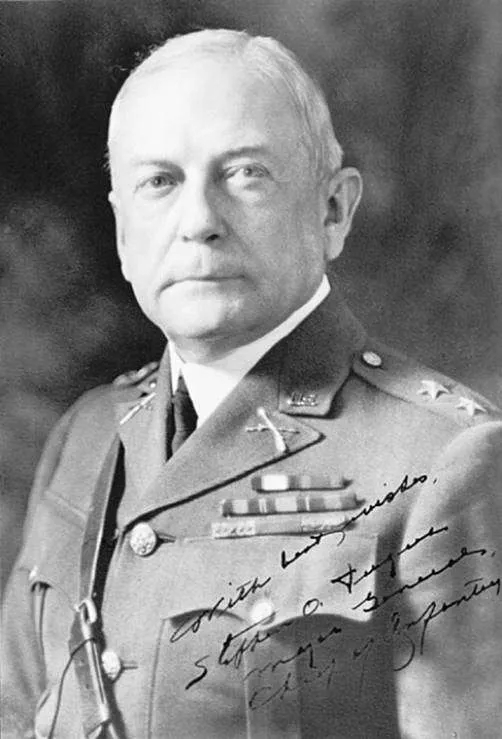
- Fuqua c. 1929–1943
- Born: December 25, 1874; Baton Rouge, Louisiana, U.S.
- Died: May 11, 1943 (aged 68); Manhattan, New York, U.S.
- Burial place: Arlington National Cemetery
- Education: Tulane University (attended); Louisiana State University (attended); United States Military Academy (attended)
- Spouse: Pauline Stafford (m. 1905–1943, his death)
- Children: 2
- Relatives: Henry L. Fuqua (brother); Hercules Bellville (grandson)
- Military career
- Service: United States Army
- Service years: 1898–1938
- Rank: Major General
- Service number: O-999
- Unit: U.S. Army Infantry Branch
- Commands: Company B, 2nd U.S. Volunteer Infantry; Department of Small Arms, U.S. Army School of Musketry; 16th Infantry Regiment; Fort Jay; U.S. Army Chief of Infantry; U.S. Military Attaché in Spain
- Wars: Spanish–American War; Philippine–American War; Pancho Villa Expedition; World War I Occupation of the Rhineland
- Awards: Army Distinguished Service Medal; Legion of Honor (Chevalier) (France); Croix de Guerre (France)
- Other work: Magazine columnist

Stephen O. Fuqua (Note: His last name was pronounced "Few-kway". and he was frequently referred to, especially in Louisiana newspapers, as S. Ogden Fuqua or Ogden Fuqua.) (December 25, 1874 – May 11, 1943) was a career officer in the United States Army. A veteran of the Spanish–American War, Philippine–American War, Pancho Villa Expedition, and World War I, he attained the rank of major general and was a recipient of the Army Distinguished Service Medal from the United States, and the French Legion of Honor (Chevalier), and Croix de Guerre.

A native of Baton Rouge, Louisiana, Fuqua attended Tulane University, Louisiana State University, and the United States Military Academy and worked for several years as a levee inspector. In 1898 he successfully applied for a commission in the army and was appointed a captain of Infantry. He served in Cuba with the 2nd United States Volunteer Infantry during the Spanish–American War, then in the Philippines with the 29th Infantry Regiment during the Philippine–American War.

Fuqua advanced through the ranks in the early 1900s, including postings to Madison Barracks, New York, Camps Overton and Parang in the Philippines, and Fort Clark, Texas. He graduated from the Infantry and Cavalry School in 1907 and the United States Army Command and General Staff College in 1908, then served as an inspector and advisor with the California National Guard. He served with the 12th Infantry Regiment at the Presidio of San Francisco and at Fort Huachuca, Arizona during the Pancho Villa Expedition. In the years immediately prior to World War I, he served as director of the Department of Small Arms at the Fort Sill, Oklahoma School of Musketry, then as the school's assistant commandant. During the war, he served as acting chief of staff of the 28th Division, assistant operations officer on the First United States Army staff, and chief of staff of the 1st Division. After taking part in the Post-war occupation of Germany, Fuqua returned to the United States in September 1919 and served again as chief of staff of the 1st Division.

After World War I, Fuqua's assignments included assistant chief of staff for Intelligence (G-2) for Third Corps Area at Fort Howard, Maryland, then for the Hawaiian Department. In the mid-1920s, he served as assistant chief of staff for operations (G-3) for Eighth Corps Area at Fort Sam Houston, Texas, then for Second Corps Area at Fort Jay, New York. From 1926 to 1929 he was executive officer of the 16th Infantry Regiment at Fort Jay, then regimental commander and commander of the post. In 1929, he was appointed U.S. Army Chief of Infantry with the temporary rank of major general, and he served until 1933. He was then appointed U.S. Military Attaché in Spain, where he remained until retiring in 1938.

After retiring, Fuqua resided in Biarritz, France before relocating to Manhattan. He authored books on military topics and was a columnist for Newsweek magazine. In addition, at the start of World War II, Fuqua provided frequent on air analysis for radio news programs. He died in Manhattan on May 11, 1943, and was buried at Arlington National Cemetery.

== Early life ==
Stephen Ogden Fuqua was born in Baton Rouge, Louisiana on December 25, 1874, a son of James Overton Fuqua and Jeannette Maria (Foules) Fuqua. His father was an attorney, veteran of the Mexican–American War, and Confederate States Army veteran of the American Civil War. James Fuqua died when Stephen Fuqua was a year old, and Stephen Fuqua was raised by his mother and older siblings, including Henry L. Fuqua, who served as governor of Louisiana from 1924 to 1926.

Fuqua was educated in Baton Rouge and was awarded a scholarship to Tulane University, which he attended from 1888 to 1889. He then attended Louisiana State University (LSU) from 1889 to 1892. While attending LSU, Fuqua became a member of the Sigma Nu fraternity. In addition, he was a member of LSU's cadet battalion and attained the rank of second sergeant in Company B, then battalion quartermaster sergeant. In June 1891, Fuqua was appointed to the United States Military Academy (West Point) by U.S. Representative Samuel Matthews Robertson, and he attended from June 1892 until withdrawing in June 1893. From 1893 to 1898, Fuqua worked as a U.S. levee inspector on the lower Mississippi River.

== Start of career ==
In July 1898, Fuqua's application for an army commission was approved and he was appointed a captain of Infantry in the United States Volunteers. He commanded Company B, 2nd U.S. Volunteer Infantry during its Spanish–American War service in Cuba, and served until he was mustered out of the volunteers in June 1899. In July 1899 he was mustered in as a first lieutenant of Infantry in the U.S. Volunteers, then served in the Philippines with the 29th Infantry Regiment during its duty in the Philippine–American War. He was promoted to captain in February 1901, and served until he was mustered out in May 1901. During his Philippines service, Fuqua was assigned at different times to Marinduque, Masbate, Ticao Island, and Samar.

Fuqua was dedicated to athletics and sports, and maintained a lifetime interest in tennis, golf, and horseback riding. While he was known to be outgoing and congenial, Fuqua was also known to have a passion for regular order and adherence to procedure, which earned him the nickname "System Steve".

== Continued career ==
In February 1901, Fuqua was appointed a second lieutenant in the regular army. Subsequent assignments after his return to the United States included duty with the 29th Infantry at the Presidio of San Francisco, and the 23rd Infantry at Fort McPherson, Georgia, Fort Ethan Allen, Vermont, and Plattsburgh Barracks, New York. He was promoted to first lieutenant in November 1901, and from 1903 to 1905 he served with the 23rd Infantry in the Philippines. He served at Madison Barracks, New York from 1905 to 1906, then attended the Infantry and Cavalry School at Fort Leavenworth, Kansas, which he completed in 1907 as a Distinguished Graduate. He graduated from the United States Army Command and General Staff College in 1908, then served again with the 23rd Infantry in the Philippines, this time at Camps Overton and Parang.

Fuqua served at Fort Clark, Texas from 1910 to 1911, then was posted to San Francisco as inspector and instructor for the California National Guard. He was promoted to captain in March 1911, and was assigned to the 12th Infantry. He served with the 12th Infantry at the Presidio of Monterey, California, in San Francisco, and at Fort Huachuca, Arizona until 1915. From 1915 to 1916, Fuqua served as director of the Department of Small Arms at the School of Musketry, which was located at Fort Sill, Oklahoma, and he subsequently served as the school's assistant commandant. From 1916 to 1917, he served again with the 12th Infantry at Fort Huachuca during the Pancho Villa Expedition.

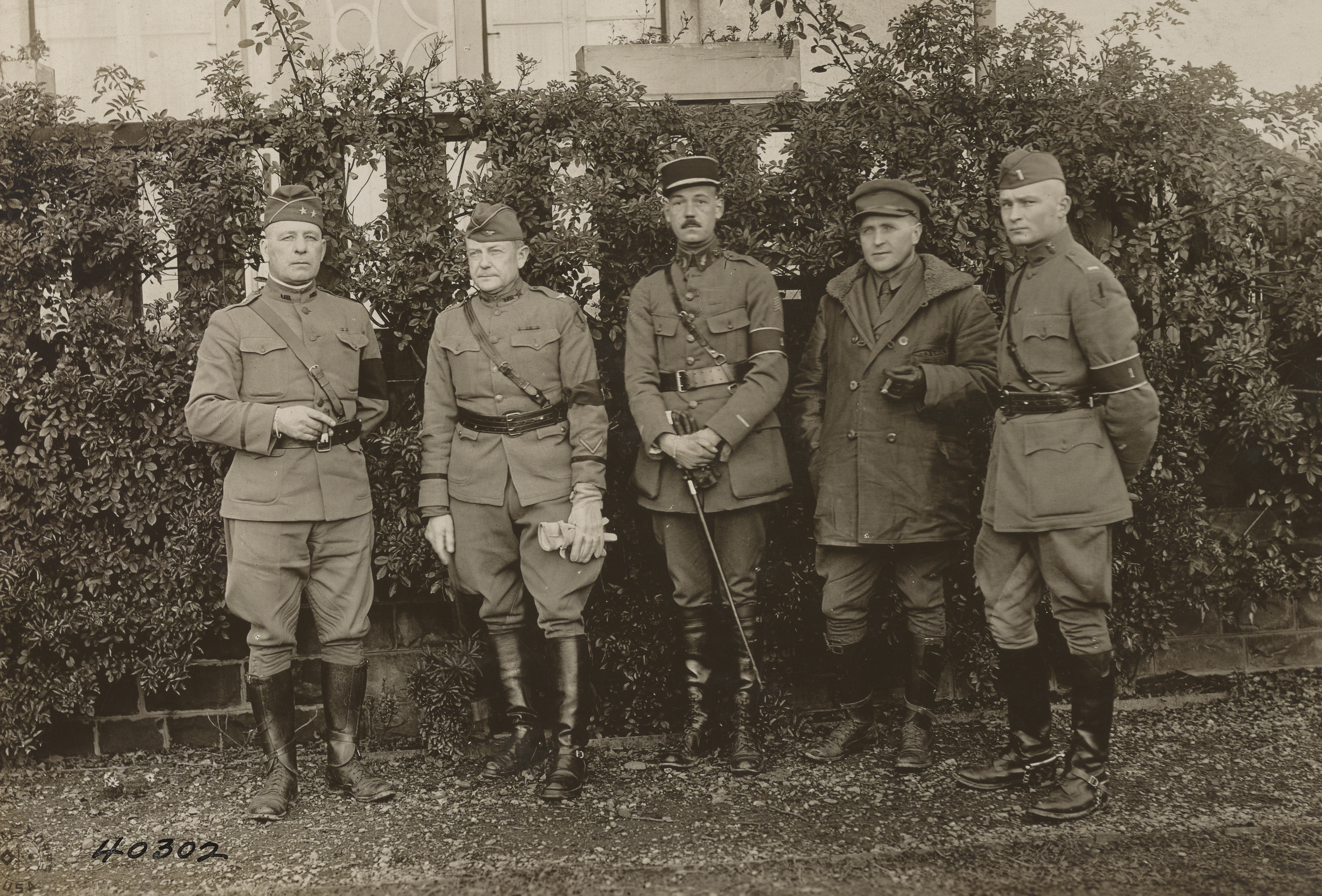
Officers at quarters occupied by Major General Edward McGlachlin Jr. (extreme left), commanding the 1st Division, at Conz, Germany, December 1918. To his left is his chief of staff, Colonel Stephen O. Fuqua.

During World War I, Fuqua was assistant chief of staff and acting chief of staff for the 37th Division during its organization and training at Camp Sheridan, Alabama from September to November 1917, and he was promoted to major in December. He then served as assistant chief of staff and acting chief of staff for the 28th Division during its organization and training at Camp Hancock, Georgia. In July 1918, Fuqua spent a month attending the General Staff College at Langres, then was assigned as assistant to the assistant chief of staff for operations (G-3) on the staff of First United States Army. He later served as chief of staff for the 1st Division, both in France before the Armistice of November 11, 1918, and in Germany during the occupation of the Rhineland. As part of the army's wartime expansion, he received promotion to temporary lieutenant colonel as of August 1917, which he accepted in March 1918, and temporary colonel as of October 1918, which he accepted in November.

Fuqua took part in the First World War's Second Battle of the Marne, Battle of the Somme, Battle of Saint-Mihiel, and Meuse–Argonne offensive. His wartime service was recognized with award of the Army Distinguished Service Medal from the United States and the French Legion of Honor (Chevalier) and Croix de Guerre. The citation for his Distinguished Service Medal reads:

War Department, General Orders No. 59 (1919). Citation: The President of the United States of America, authorized by Act of Congress, July 9, 1918, takes pleasure in presenting the Army Distinguished Service Medal to Colonel (Infantry) Stephen Ogden Fuqua, United States Army, for exceptionally meritorious and distinguished services to the Government of the United States, in a duty of great responsibility during World War I. In charge of the troop movement subsection of G-3, 1st Army, from its organization until he became Chief of Staff, 1st Division, Colonel Fuqua was responsible for and supervised the movements incident to the concentration of troops for the St. Mihiel and Meuse-Argonne offensives of the 1st Army, which involved many thousands of men and was accomplished with the greatest success. His untiring, painstaking, and energetic efforts had a marked effect on the success of these major operations.

== Later career ==
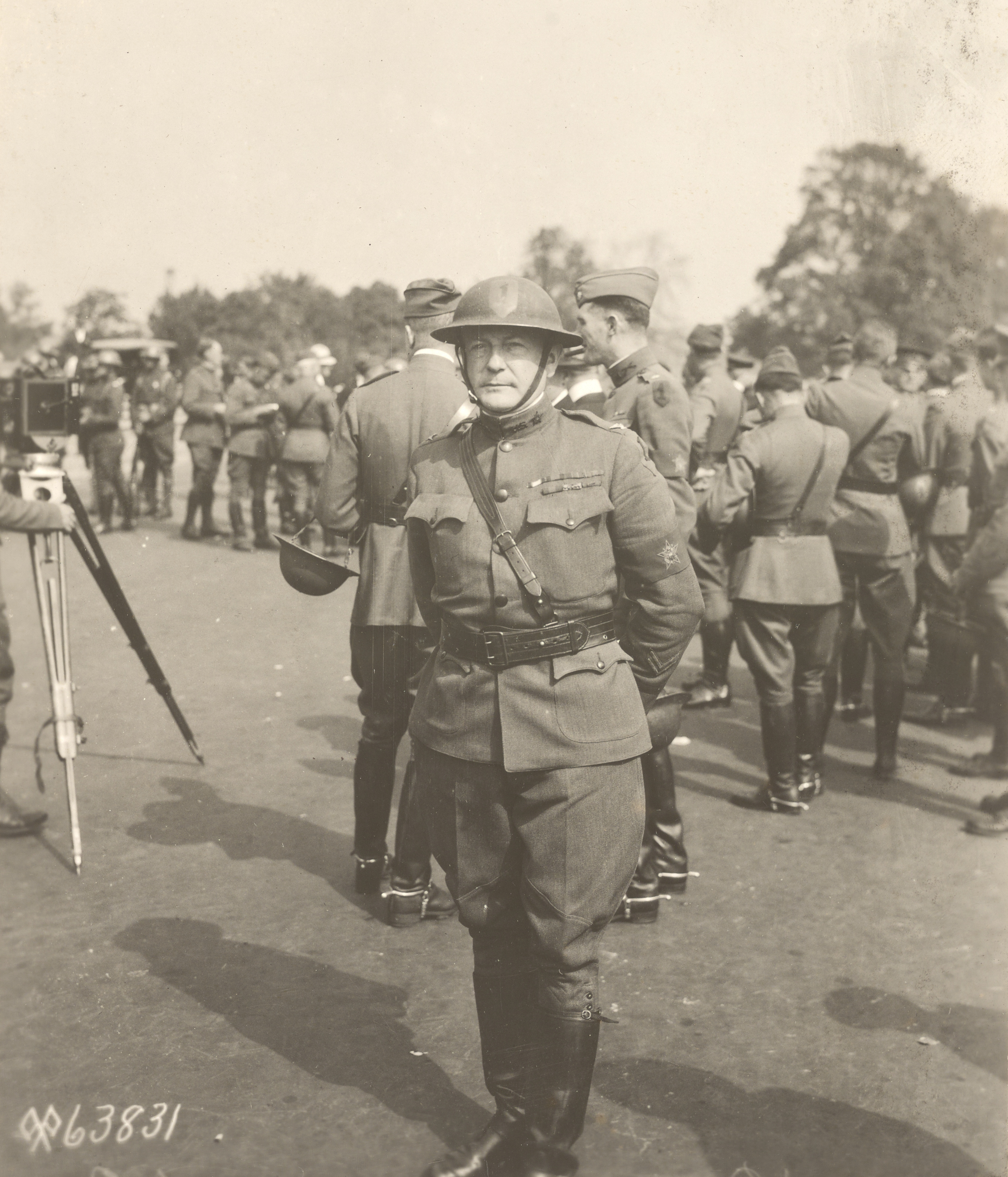
Fuqua at a 1st Infantry Division parade in Washington, D.C., September 17, 1919

After post-war occupation duty in Koblenz, Fuqua returned to the United States in September 1919 and served as chief of staff of the 1st Division, first at Camp Zachary Taylor, Kentucky, then at Fort Dix, New Jersey. He was reduced from temporary colonel to his permanent rank of major in June 1920, and was promoted to permanent lieutenant colonel in July 1920. Fuqua served as assistant chief of staff for Intelligence (G-2) for Third Corps Area at Fort Howard, Maryland from 1921, then was assigned as G-2 of the Hawaiian Department. After completing an Infantry refresher course for field grade officers at Fort Benning, Georgia in 1924, Fuqua served as assistant chief of staff for operations (G-3) for Eighth Corps Area at Fort Sam Houston, Texas, then for Second Corps Area at Fort Jay, New York. From 1926 to 1929, Fuqua served first as executive officer of the 16th Infantry Regiment at Fort Jay, then as commander of the regiment and the Fort Jay garrison. He was promoted to colonel in January 1928.

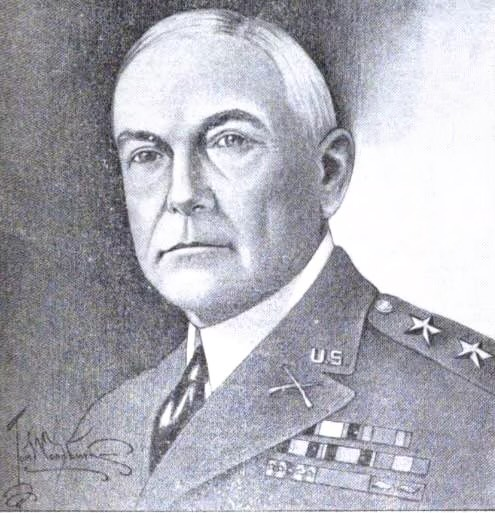
U.S. Army Recruiting News, October 15, 1929

Beginning with his World War I service, Fuqua frequently served on the staff of Charles P. Summerall, including Summerall's command of the 1st Division during and after the war, and Summerall's command of the Hawaiian Department and Eighth and Second Corps Areas. In 1926, Summerall became Chief of Staff of the United States Army, and in 1929 he selected Fuqua to serve as the army's Chief of Infantry as a temporary major general. Fuqua was selected over the currently serving major generals and brigadier generals, as well as the 164 colonels who were senior to him, but Secretary of War James William Good and President Herbert Hoover concurred, and Fuqua received the appointment.

During his tenure as head of the Infantry branch, Fuqua supported design, experimentation, and fielding of tanks in support of Infantry, while opposing the idea of creating a separate Armor Branch. As part of this effort, the army's tank school was moved from Fort Meade, Maryland to Fort Benning, the home of the Infantry school. Despite Fuqua's position, the army embraced the concept of mechanization, including the creation of a separate Armor force.

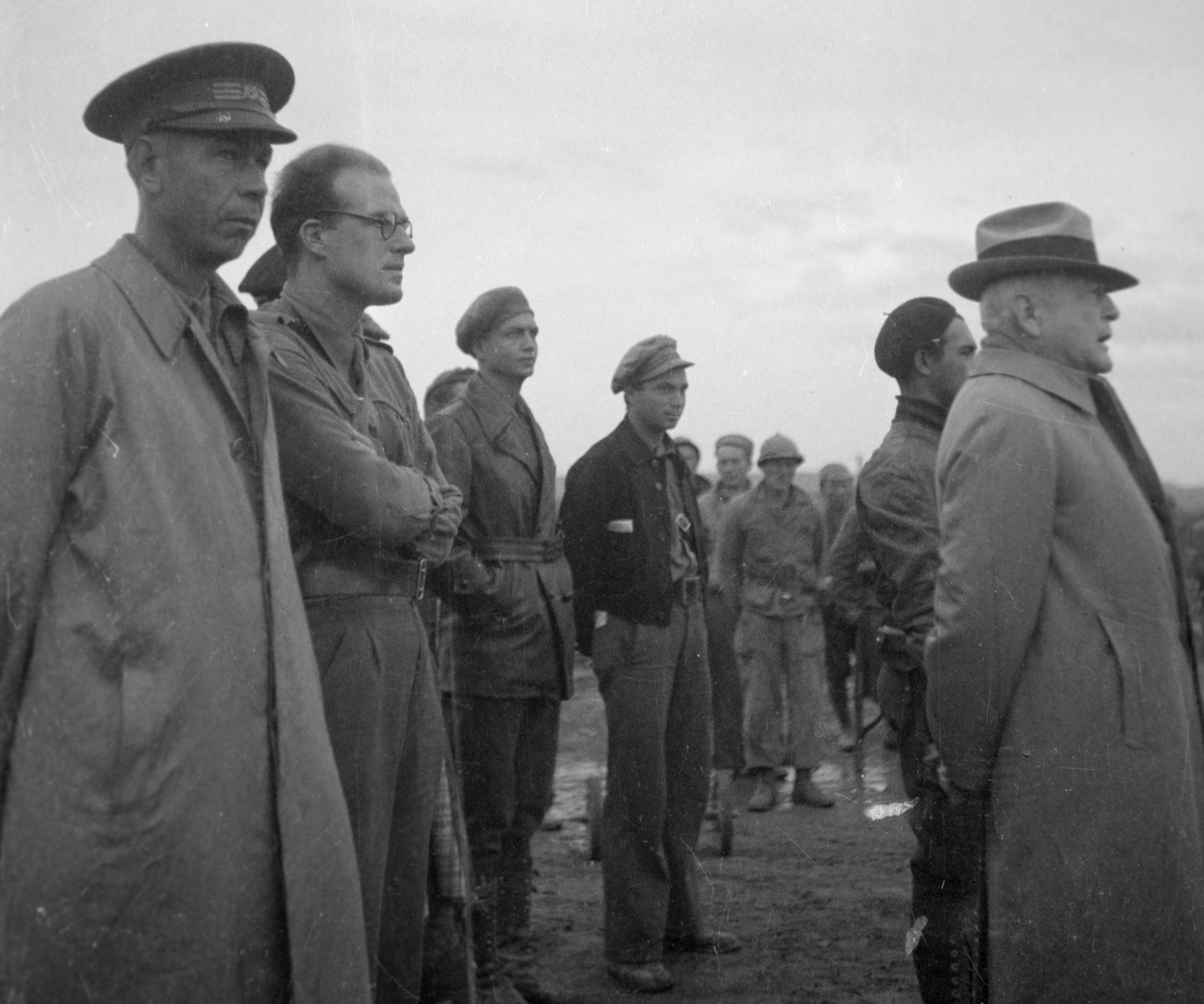
Fuqua (far right) observes the Abraham Lincoln Brigade alongside commander Robert Hale Merriman (second from left) in Quinto, October 1937

When his term as Chief of Infantry expired in May 1933, he reverted to his permanent rank of colonel and was assigned as U.S. military attaché in Spain. Serving in Madrid during the Spanish Civil War, Fuqua continued to observe tanks in action. After observing light tanks armed only with machine guns fail to overcome determined enemy defenses, Fuqua reported to the War Department that tanks were no match for effective anti-tank gun fie and recommended that they be used only in support of attacking Infantry. Other U.S. military leaders, including Adna R. Chaffee Jr. used the lessons of the war in Spain to develop better and bigger tanks with large main guns, as well as separate tactics and doctrine for employing them in large formations, which proved vital to Allied success in World War II.

== Retirement and death ==
Fuqua retired upon reaching the mandatory retirement age of 64 in 1938. After retiring, Fuqua remained in Spain as a civilian to assist his successor as the start of World War II drew closer. He then lived first in Biarritz, France, a city near the border with Spain where his wife had resided during the fighting in Spain, then in Manhattan. Fuqua was a columnist for Newsweek magazine. In 1940, he published Americans Wanted: Your Place in Our Military Structure, a book that provided details on the organization and functions of the U.S. military. Fuqua was also a frequent commentator on military events for radio news programs.

Fuqua died in Manhattan on May 11, 1943. He was buried at Arlington National Cemetery.

== Family ==
On April 25, 1905, Fuqua married Pauline Stafford (1886–1979), the daughter of an army officer, in San Francisco. They were the parents of two children, Jeannette Stafford Fuqua (1907–1995) and Stephen Ogden Fuqua Jr. (1911–1999). Jeannette Fuqua was the wife of British businessman Rupert Bellville and the mother of film producer Hercules Bellville. The younger Stephen Fuqua was a 1933 graduate of West Point who attained the rank of brigadier general and was a veteran of World War II and the Korean War. Stephen O. Fuqua Jr. was the father of American actor Joseph Fuqua.
