= Phantom Life =

1992 film

- French: La Vie fantôme
- Directed by: Jacques Leduc
- Written by: Jacques Leduc; Yvon Rivard
- Based on: La Vie fantôme by Danièle Sallenave
- Produced by: Roger Frappier
- Starring: Ron Lea; Johanne-Marie Tremblay; Pascale Bussières
- Cinematography: Pierre Mignot
- Edited by: Yves Chaput
- Production company: Max Films Productions
- Release date: August 29, 1992 (MWFF)
- Running time: 98 minutes
- Country: Canada
- Language: French

Phantom Life (French: La Vie fantôme) is a Canadian drama film, directed by Jacques Leduc and released in 1992. An adaptation of the novel by Danièle Sallenave, the film stars Ron Lea as Pierre, an academic at the Université de Sherbrooke who is torn between his marriage to Annie (Johanne-Marie Tremblay) and his extramarital affair with the younger Laure (Pascale Bussières).

The film's cast also includes Gabriel Gascon, Rita Lafontaine, Jean-Guy Bouchard and Élise Guilbault.

The film premiered at the 1992 Montreal World Film Festival, where it was named the most popular Canadian film of the festival. Bussières also won the award for Best Actress.

The film received five Genie Award nominations at the 13th Genie Awards, for Best Adapted Screenplay (Leduc and Yvon Rivard), Best Cinematography (Pierre Mignot), Best Art Direction/Production Design (Louise Jobin), Best Costume Design (Michèle Hamel) and Best Sound Editing (Jérôme Décarie, Diane Boucher, Michel Bordeleau, Francine Poirier and Claude Beaugrand).
