= Solitaire (1991 film) =

- Directed by: Francis Damberger
- Written by: Francis Damberger
- Produced by: Lars Lehmann
- Starring: Michael Hogan; Paul Coeur; Valerie Pearson
- Cinematography: Peter Wunstorf
- Edited by: Lenka Svab
- Music by: Michael Becker
- Production company: Highway One Motion Pictures
- Release date: 1991
- Running time: 105 minutes
- Country: Canada
- Language: English

Solitaire is a Canadian drama film, directed by Francis Damberger and released in 1991. The film stars Paul Coeur and Valerie Pearson as Burt and Maggie, smalltown residents whose friendship is tested when Al (Michael Hogan), Burt's high school best friend and Maggie's ex-fiancé, returns home for a visit on Christmas Eve for the first time since his enlistment in the Vietnam War.

The film won seven Rosies at the Alberta Film and Television Awards in 1992, including Best Director (Damberger), Best Actor (Coeur), Best Actress (Pearson), Best Screenplay (Damberger), Best Art Direction (John Blackie) and Best Editing (Lenka Svab). It received four Genie Award nominations at the 13th Genie Awards, for Best Actress (Pearson), Best Supporting Actor (Hogan), Best Original Screenplay (Damberger) and Best Original Score (Michael Becker). Hogan won the Genie for Best Supporting Actor.
