= Beware of Dog (TV series) =

- Created by: Rob Gilmer
- Starring: Park Bench; Carolyn Dunn; Richard Waugh; Gage Knox; Alex Appel
- Voices of: Park Bench
- Country of origin: United States
- Original language: English
- No. of seasons: 1
- No. of episodes: 2

Production
- Executive producers: Don Enright; Elizabeth Mozden; Les Alexander; Rob Gilmer
- Running time: 30 minutes
- Production companies: Alexander/Enright and Associates; Nelvana

Original release
- Network: Animal Planet
- Release: August 13, 2002

Beware of Dog is an American sitcom that aired on Animal Planet. While it had two episodes broadcast consecutively on August 13, 2002, this was the only time that the series made it to the air.

== Synopsis ==
The program focuses on a Bearded Collie named Jack (played by Chip, voiced by Park Bench), whose Look Who's Talking-style narration provided his perspective of his newly adopted family. Carolyn Dunn and Richard Waugh portrayed Mary and Bill Poole, parents of Mark (Gage Knox) and Jessica (Alex Appel).

The pilot showed how Jack feigned an injury in a grocery store parking lot to entice Jessica into taking him to the family house. The family collectively decided to take care of him until the injury is healed, but Jack became a permanent resident after disrupting a family argument and saving Mark from a neighborhood gang.

The second – and last – episode to be aired had Jack being kicked out of the Poole home after ruining Bill's vacation plans; the rest of the episode was spent on the family's search for the dog after Bill had a change of heart.

== Cast ==
- Carolyn Dunn as Mary Poole
- Richard Waugh as Bill Poole
- Gage Knox as Mark Poole
- Alex Appel as Jessica Poole
- Park Bench as Jack (voice)

== Episodes ==
No.	Title	Directed by	Written by	Original release date
1	"Born to Be Wild"	Richard Martin	Rob Gilmer	August 13, 2002
2	"Hit the Road Jack"	Richard Martin	Rob Gilmer	August 13, 2002

== Production notes ==
Beware of Dog was directed by Richard Martin, who also served in that position for the motion pictures Matinee and Disney's Air Bud: Golden Receiver. Rob Gilmer was the screenwriter. The executive producers were Don Enright, Elizabeth Mozden, and Les Alexander.
