= The Pooch and the Pauper =

- Film Poster
- Directed by: Alex Zamm
- Written by: Mark Steilen; Bennett Yellin
- Produced by: Ronald E. Frazier
- Starring: Richard Karn; Fred Willard; Vincent Schiavelli; Cody Jones; Peter MacNicol (Voice); Daryl Mitchell (Voice); George Wendt
- Cinematography: Albert J. Dunk
- Edited by: Jimmy Hill
- Music by: Chris Hajian
- Production companies: Sandollar Television; Walt Disney Television
- Distributed by: ABC; Disney-ABC Domestic Television
- Release date: July 1, 2000
- Running time: 88 minutes
- Country: United States
- Language: English

The Pooch and the Pauper is a 2000 American television film, starring Richard Karn, Fred Willard, Vincent Schiavelli, Peter MacNicol, Daryl Mitchell and George Wendt. It was directed by Alex Zamm. The off-screen names of the two starring dogs in the film are Screamer and Petey.

== Plot ==
The film is an adaptation of the Mark Twain classic 1881 novel, The Prince and the Pauper. But now the story is set in the present time and have dogs as the protagonists. Liberty, "The First Dog" and Moocher, a street dog, have their lives turned upside down when they change places by mistake.

== Cast ==
- Richard Karn as Agent Dainville
- Fred Willard as President Caldwell
- Vincent Schiavelli as Willy Wishbow
- Cody Jones as Nate Gibson
- Carolyn Dunn as Mary Gibson
- Laura Press as Margaret Caldwell
- Peter MacNicol as Liberty the First American Bulldog (Voice)
- Daryl Mitchell as Moocher the Street American Bulldog (Voice)
- George Wendt as Sheldon Sparks

== Reception ==
Robert Pardi from TV Guide gave the film two out of four, concluding: "Anyone who believes our four-legged friends can manipulate human behavior will enjoy this mongrel diversion that combines moral lessons with frisky comedy."
