= Lonesome Joe =

- Directed by: Mark Sawers
- Written by: Mark Sawers
- Produced by: Leah Mallen
- Starring: Adrien Dorval; Paul McGillion; Brent Stait
- Cinematography: Gregory Middleton
- Edited by: Michelle Floyd
- Music by: Don MacDonald
- Production companies: Short Life Productions; Mark Sawers Productions
- Release date: September 2002 (TIFF)
- Running time: 13 minutes
- Country: Canada
- Language: English

Lonesome Joe is a Canadian short comedy-drama film, directed by Mark Sawers and released in 2002. The film stars Adrien Dorval as Joe, a lonely tow truck driver whose desire for companionship may be fulfilled when he rescues a dog from being stolen by thieves.

The film premiered at the 2002 Toronto International Film Festival. It was subsequently screened theatrically as the opener to screenings of Isabel Coixet's 2003 film My Life Without Me.

The film was a Genie Award nominee for Best Live Action Short Drama at the 24th Genie Awards in 2004.
