= Debbie Nightingale =

Canadian film producer (1953–2025)

- Nightingale at Haute Goat in Port Hope
- Born: October 14, 1953; Toronto, Ontario
- Died: July 10, 2025 (aged 71)
- Occupations: Film and television producer, film festival programmer
- Writing career
- Notable works: The Line, Living in Your Car

Debbie Nightingale (October 14, 1953 – July 10, 2025) was a Canadian film and television producer, most noted as a co-founder of the Hot Docs Canadian International Documentary Festival.

== Life and career ==
Nightingale began her career in film with the Ontario Film Development Corporation in the 1980s, and was later an organizer of film industry conferences for the Festival of Festivals and the National Film Board of Canada.

In 1993, Nightingale and Paul Jay launched Hot Docs. She remained the festival's executive director for a number of years thereafter.

In 2000 she launched her own production company, The Nightingale Company, to produce films and television series. Her most noted credits with the company included the television film Chicks with Sticks, about a women's hockey team, the television drama series The Line, and the comedy series Living in Your Car, which was a Gemini Award nominee for Best Comedy Series at the 26th Gemini Awards in 2011. The company also announced the development of Us and Them, a television comedy series which would have starred Aubrey (Drake) Graham and Mazin Elsadig, in 2009, although the series never completed production as it was around this time that Graham's career as a rapper began to take off.

Later in life, Nightingale and her husband Shain Jaffe moved to Campbellford, Ontario, where they launched Haute Goat, a public goat farm that offered visitors the opportunity to interact with the animals. Over the course of her career, Nightingale also served on the boards of the Canadian Independent Film Caucus and the Toronto chapter of Women in Film and Television International.

Nightingale died from cancer on July 10, 2025, at the age of 71.
