= The Shower (film) =

- Directed by: Gail Harvey
- Written by: Gail Harvey; Richard Beattie
- Produced by: Gail Harvey; Marlee Novak
- Starring: Kate Lynch; Brent Carver; Janet-Laine Green
- Cinematography: Ray Boyle
- Edited by: Rik Morden
- Music by: Shane Harvey
- Release date: 1992
- Running time: 82 minutes
- Country: Canada
- Language: English

The Shower is a 1992 Canadian comedy-drama film, directed by Gail Harvey. The film stars Kate Lynch as Sheila, whose baby shower for her pregnant sister is thrown into turmoil when her sister unexpectedly goes into premature labour.

The film's cast also includes Kay Tremblay, Joyce Campion, Janet-Laine Green, Krista Bridges, Brent Carver, Chas Lawther, Sean Hewitt and Shirley Douglas.

The film received three Genie Award nominations at the 13th Genie Awards: Best Actress (Green), Best Supporting Actress (Bridges) and Best Original Song (Gordon Norris and Larry Harvey for "Oh What a Fool You Made of Me"),
