= Icarus (2010 film) =

- Theatrical release poster
- Directed by: Dolph Lundgren
- Written by: Raul Sanchez Inglis
- Produced by: Breanne Hartley; Kirk Shaw
- Starring: Dolph Lundgren; David Lewis; Samantha Ferris; Bo Svenson
- Cinematography: Marc Windon
- Edited by: Jamie Alain
- Music by: James Jandrisch
- Production companies: CineTel Films; Corus Entertainment Inc.; Icarus BC Productions; Insight Film Studios; The Movie Network; Super Écran
- Distributed by: Anchor Bay Films; CineTel Films
- Release date: February 9, 2010 (Canada)
- Running time: 88 minutes
- Country: Canada
- Language: English
- Budget: $6 million
- Box office: $73,000

Icarus (stylized on-screen as Dolph Lundgren is The Killing Machine) is a 2010 Canadian action film starring and directed by Dolph Lundgren. The film co-stars David Lewis, Samantha Ferris, and Bo Svenson. The film centers around Edward Genn, a former Soviet hitman known as "Icarus". After the collapse of the Soviet Union, he has moved to the United States to begin a new life, but his past catches up to him.

== Production and distribution ==
On August 8, 2008, Lundgren signed a contract with Insight Film Studios to direct and star in Icarus. It was produced on a $6 million budget, and filming began in October 2008 in Vancouver, British Columbia, Canada. Filming was expected to last five weeks, but reportedly wrapped after 18 days.

At the 2008 Cannes Film Market, CineTel Films acquired the international distribution rights to the film. The world premiere took place on Canadian television. This was followed by a limited theatrical release in a number of countries. The film received mixed reviews; praise was given for the action scenes and violence.

== Plot ==
Genn (Dolph Lundgren) is known by most in his life as a divorced father working for an investment company. Before this, for years, he had worked as a sleeper agent called Icarus in America before the Soviet Union collapsed.

A mishap in Hong Kong blows Icarus' cover, past and present collide and he becomes a target. The people that want him dead will stop at nothing to get to him and that means going after what he cares about most, his wife and daughter.

Icarus has to fight for his life and to protect his loved ones, while uncovering who is after him.

== Cast ==
- Dolph Lundgren as Edward "Eddie" Genn / Icarus
- David Lewis as Mr. Graham
- Samantha Ferris as Kerr
- Bo Svenson as Vadim Voroshilov
- Stefanie von Pfetten as Joey (credited as Stefanie Von Pfetten)
- Lindsay Maxwell as April
- John Tench as Serge
- Katelyn Mager as Taylor
- Monique Ganderton as Kim

The film also stars Slavi Slavov as Oleg; Stephen M.D. Chang as John, a Chinese crime boss; Igor Morozov as a Russian officer; Mike Carpenter and Marian Koprada, portraying younger versions of Icarus and Vadim; and Dan Payne and Chantal Forde in minor roles as Dave and Janet.

== Production ==
=== Casting ===
Kirk Shaw, the president and executive producer of Insight Film, arranged for Lundgren to be flown into Canada for dinner. After scouting filming locations and meeting with a local scriptwriter, the deal was sealed.

Samantha Ferris was cast as Kerr, a role originally written for a male actor. No alterations were made to the script, and Ferris described her character as being "kind [of] half guy, half girl".

=== Filming ===
Principal photography began in October, 2008. Shot entirely in Vancouver, British Columbia, Canada, filming was expected to last five weeks, but reportedly wrapped after 18 days. According to Ferris, Lundgren had a strong vision for the film.

== Release ==
=== Marketing ===
First images from the film set emerged in early July, 2009. This coincided with the release of a teaser poster and teaser trailer later the same month. The official trailer was released a year later on July 23, 2010. In an effort to promote the film's DVD release, two behind-the-scenes featurettes were published beforehand. In them, Lundgren discusses his role as an actor and director, how he prepares for filming action scenes, and how he trains prior to performing any stunts.

=== Distribution ===
At the 2008 Cannes Film Market, CineTel Films acquired the international distribution rights to Icarus. According to the president and CEO of Cinetel Films, Paul Hertzberg, the "strong sales response Icarus received at [the Cannes Film Market reflected] the film's potential to be a hit among audiences around the world".

=== Home media ===
On August 16, 2010, the film was distributed on both Blu-ray and DVD in the United Kingdom by Anchor Bay, followed by the United States on October 19.

== Reception ==
=== Box office ===
On February 9, 2010, the worldwide premiere took place on Canadian television. This was followed by a limited theatrical release in a number of countries, including: the United States (on September 10, 2010), the United Arab Emirates (on October 28), Bahrain (on November 25), Oman (on December 2), and Kuwait (on December 16).

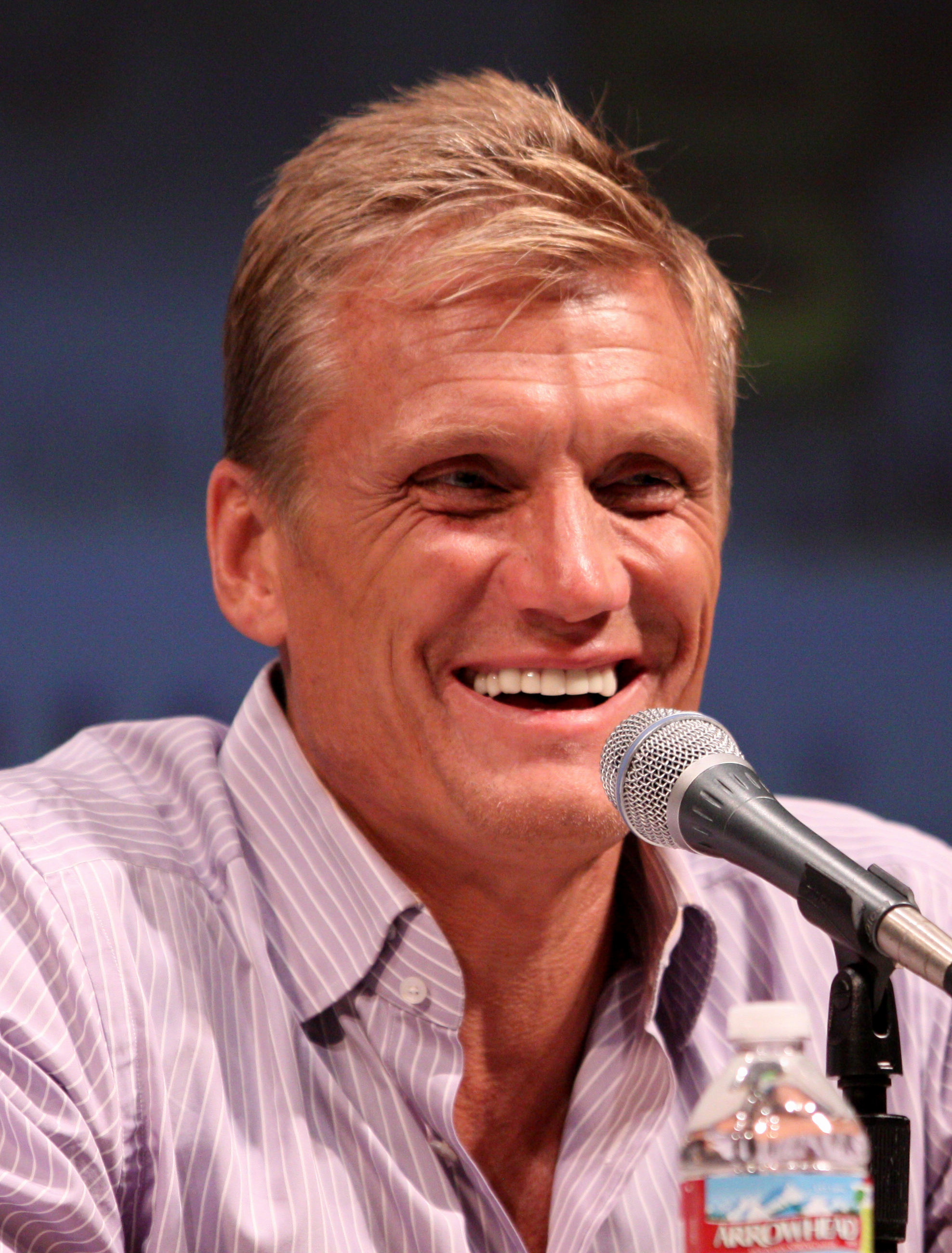
Lundgren in July, 2010

In its first week of release in the UAE, the film debuted in sixth place and grossed $56,475 at the box office ($4,034 per screening). In the second week of release, the film dropped to nineteenth place and grossed a further $1,350 ($338 per screening). This was down 97 percent from the film's opening weekend. In its third and final week of release, gross profits went down a further 89 percent; the film dropped to twenty-sixth place and grossed $139 from one theater showing. By the end of its theatrical run, Icarus grossed a total of $72,643 at the UAE box office.

=== Critical response ===
Icarus received mixed reviews from film critics. Jason Rugaard of Movie Mavericks awarded it three out of four stars, praising the action scenes and choreography, also saying the "quieter moments that allowed the actors to shine." According to him, Lundgren has "matured into a subtle actor with an intriguing screen presence." He summarized his review by warning readers of the "mystifying and miscalculated final shot that nearly destroys the entire film".

"Without a doubt, Icarus is made up of pure B-action movie goodness. While it certainly leaves enough room for character pathos, the film doesn’t skimp on the action."

— Beyond Hollywood on Icarus

Eoin Friel of The Action Elite, awarded it three out of five stars. He praised the film's pace, but criticized the film for being poorly shot, citing shaking of the camera and slow motion, which "ruins a lot of the action scenes." He did not like the abrupt ending that "left open for a potential sequel that will likely never happen".

David Brook of Row Three awarded it two and a half stars out of five. He felt the action scenes were "frantically (but not overly) edited" and enjoyable. He noted the film spends a lot of time showing Edward Genn and his family; "which doesn't really work at all". He criticized the dialogue and acting. According to Brook, Icarus is "not a film to analyse, just one to sit back and enjoy".

Chris Wright of What Culture was very critical of the film. He compared the opening titles to a bad American TV show or video game, and felt the narration throughout was "mostly pointless and full of obvious, clichéd philosophies". He said that Lundgren "spends his time mumbling while pouting and posturing moodily through his scenes." Despite giving a primarily negative review, Wright stated the "overall quality of the picture is very good for its release."
