= Xénofolies =

- Directed by: Michel Moreau
- Written by: Michel Moreau
- Produced by: Éric Michel
- Cinematography: Martin Leclerc
- Edited by: Camille Laperrière
- Music by: Maxime Du Bois; Alain Regaudie
- Production company: National Film Board of Canada
- Release date: 1991
- Running time: 54 minutes
- Country: Canada
- Language: French

Xénofolies is a Canadian short documentary film, directed by Michel Moreau and released in 1991. The film centres on the challenges of cultural integration at a racially diverse secondary school in Montreal.

The film was a Genie Award nominee for Best Short Documentary at the 13th Genie Awards in 1992.
