= Thicker Than Blood: The Larry McLinden Story =

1994 American television film

- Title card
- Genre: Biography; Drama
- Written by: Judson Klinger
- Directed by: Michael Dinner
- Starring: Peter Strauss; Rachel Ticotin; Lynn Whitfield
- Theme music composer: Johnny Harris
- Country of origin: United States
- Original language: English

Production
- Executive producers: Les Alexander; Don Enright
- Producer: Julian Marks
- Production location: Toronto
- Cinematography: Rene Ohashi
- Editor: James Austin Stewart
- Running time: 90 minutes
- Production companies: Alexander/Enright & Associates; Front Street Pictures; World International Network

Original release
- Network: CBS
- Release: March 6, 1994

Thicker Than Blood: The Larry McLinden Story is a 1994 drama television film directed by Michael Dinner, written by Judson Klinger, and starring Peter Strauss, Rachel Ticotin and Lynn Whitfield. The film first aired on March 6, 1994 on CBS. It is based on a true story of a Californian custody battle.

The film was filmed in Toronto, Ontario, Canada. Four years after the film's release, main stars Peter Strauss and Rachel Ticotin married, on December 31, 1998. Although the film did not see a home video release in America, it was released on both VHS and DVD in 2004 in the UK through Odyssey under the title Thicker Than Blood. During the 1990s, the film was also released on VHS in Brazil by Mundial Filmes.

== Plot ==
Securities broker Larry McLinden and Diane Middleton are experiencing a rocky affair when Diane announces that she's pregnant. When it's discovered that infant Larry Jr. has traces of cocaine in his blood, the couple's romance is over. Except Larry - now far more enthusiastic about parenthood - wants custody of the child, whom Diane has taken to Florida. Larry's attorney Bobbie Mallory sues, and a custody arrangement is set up, which Diane soon breaks, explaining that her son needs more time with her. Then she marries David Meadows, and tells Larry that the two will try to adopt Larry Jr. As the fight drags on, Diane surprises everyone by suddenly truthfully claiming, contrary to everything she'd said before, that Larry is not the child's biological father, causing things to become even more complicated.

== Cast ==
- Peter Strauss as Larry McLinden
  - Kevin Zegers as Young Larry McLinden
- Rachel Ticotin as Diane Middleton
- Lynn Whitfield as Bobbie Mallory
- Brenda Bazinet as Mary McLinden
- Jacob Zelik Penn as Larry McLinden Jr.
- Bob Dishy as Glen Schwartz
- Susan Hogan as Dr. Sandra Baldwin
- Carolyn Dunn as Nikki Amato
- Patricia Gage as Judge Lara Parkes
- Mark Wilson as Jay Kessler
- Booth Savage as David Meadows
- Tara Strong as Tina
  - Maia Filar as Young Tina
- Gil Filar as Andy
- Sherry Miller as Linda
- Victoria Snow as Claudia

== Critical reception ==
AllMovie gave the film a rating of two and a half out of five stars. Digiguide.TV gave the film three out of five stars. Locate TV gave a favorable review and described the film as a "powerful tug-of-love drama." Variety was unfavorable, stating: "Title and casting lead to belief that sympathy is supposed to be with McLinden, but in Judson Klinger's diffuse script, Larry is dumb as a stump. Everybody plays this in deadly earnest among generic Toronto locations. Michael Dinner's rote direction shows no energy; tech credits are routine."
