= Michel Moreau =

Canadian documentary filmmaker

Michel Moreau (October 2, 1931 - September 4, 2012) was a Canadian documentary filmmaker. He was most noted for his short documentary film Xénofolies, which was a Genie Award nominee for Best Short Documentary at the 13th Genie Awards in 1992, and his feature documentary A Childhood in Natashquan (Une enfance à Natashquan), which was a Genie nominee for Best Feature Length Documentary at the 14th Genie Awards in 1993.

His other films included Jules the Magnificent (Jules le magnifique), about a man with cerebral palsy, and The Three Montreals of Michel Tremblay (Les trois Montréals de Michel Tremblay), a documentary about writer Michel Tremblay.
