= A Childhood in Natashquan =

- French: Une enfance à Natashquan
- Directed by: Michel Moreau
- Produced by: Yvon Provost
- Cinematography: Jean-Claude Labrecque
- Edited by: Dominique Fortin
- Release date: February 13, 1993 (RVCQ)
- Running time: 74 minutes
- Country: Canada
- Language: French

A Childhood in Natashquan (French: Une enfance à Natashquan) is a Canadian documentary film, directed by Michel Moreau and released in 1993. The film is a portrait of the childhood of influential Québécois singer-songwriter Gilles Vigneault in the remote northern Quebec town of Natashquan.

The film premiered as the closing film of the 1993 Rendez-vous du cinéma québécois.

The film was a Genie Award nominee for Best Feature Length Documentary at the 14th Genie Awards in 1993.
