= True Confections =

- Directed by: Gail Singer
- Written by: Gail Singer
- Based on: True Confections by Sondra Gotlieb
- Release date: August 24, 1991
- Running time: 95 minutes
- Country: Canada
- Language: English

True Confections is a 1991 Canadian comedy-drama film written and directed by Gail Singer. Based on Sondra Gotlieb's Stephen Leacock Award-winning novel True Confections, it stars Leslie Hope as Verna Miller, a young Jewish woman growing up in the 1950s who rebels against the rigid gender role assigned to women in her era due to her ahead-of-her-time sensibilities and life aspirations.

Rather than a strict adaptation of Gotlieb's novel, Singer added some material to the screenplay that was more reflective of her own experiences in that era.

The film's cast also includes Judah Katz, Chandra West, Jeff Pustil, Jill Riley, Stewart Bick and Daniel Kash.

The film premiered at the Montreal World Film Festival in August 1991, and was screened at the 1991 Festival of Festivals in September. Singer's documentary film Wisecracks was also screened at the 1991 Festival of Festivals, making her the first filmmaker in the festival's history to have both a documentary and a narrative fiction film screened at the festival in the same year.

== Award nominations ==
The film garnered three Genie Award nominations at the 13th Genie Awards in 1992:

- Best Original Screenplay: Gail Singer
- Best Art Direction/Production Design: Andris Hausmanis
- Best Costume Design: Alisa Alexander
