= Wounded (1997 film) =

- Directed by: Richard Martin
- Written by: Harry Longstreet; Lindsay Bourne
- Produced by: Robert Vince; William Vince
- Starring: Mädchen Amick; Graham Greene; Adrian Pasdar; Robert Costanzo; Richard Joseph Paul
- Cinematography: Gregory Middleton
- Edited by: Kerry Uchida
- Music by: Ross Vannelli
- Release date: 1997
- Running time: 96 minutes
- Country: Canada
- Language: English

Wounded is a 1997 Canadian film directed by Richard Martin and starring Mädchen Amick, Graham Greene, Adrian Pasdar, Robert Costanzo and Richard Joseph Paul.

== Plot ==
The story follows wildlife ranger Julie Clayton who, alongside her boyfriend and fellow ranger Don Powell, discovers multiple slaughtered grizzly bears in a remote forest. When they report the killings, federal agents join them to hunt the poacher responsible, but the man they seek, Hanaghan, kills Don and severely wounds Julie during the confrontation. Julie survives and, devastated by the loss of her partner, becomes determined to confront the killer. While recovering, she meets Nick Rollins, an alcoholic police detective who encourages her to channel her pain into revenge. As Julie’s pursuit continues, the FBI decides to use her as bait to draw out Hanaghan, who has become obsessed with her, leading to a tense personal confrontation between hunter and hunted.

== Cast ==
- Mädchen Amick as Julie Clayton
- Graham Greene as Nick Rollins
- Adrian Pasdar as Hanaghan
- Robert Costanzo as Stu Sachen
- Richard Joseph Paul as Don Powell
- Daniel Kash as David Boyd
- Jim Beaver as Agent Eric Ashton
- François Chau as Mr. Lee
- Michael Anthony Rawlins as Agent Clark
- J.B. Bivens as Richard Pearson
- Greg Rogers as Dr. Jay Voight
- Jerry Wasserman as Dr. Sam Cohen
- Frank Crudele as Bill Gillespie
- Michael Dobson as Lee's Lawyer
- Akiko Morison as Nurse
- Patrick Gorman as Paramedic
- Adam J. Harrington as Paramedic
