= Camera Shy (film) =

2012 film by Mark Sawers

- Release poster
- Directed by: Mark Sawers
- Screenplay by: Mark Sawers; Doug Barber
- Story by: Mark Sawers
- Produced by: Galen Fletcher; Leah Mallen
- Starring: Nicolas Wright; Hilary Jardine; Lara Gilchrist; Gerard Plunkett
- Cinematography: Brian Johnson
- Edited by: Cameron Glegg
- Music by: Don MacDonald
- Production company: Mark Sawers Productions
- Release date: October 6, 2012 (VIFF)
- Running time: 91 minutes
- Country: Canada
- Language: English

Camera Shy is a 2012 Canadian dark comedy film co-written and directed by Mark Sawers. The film stars Nicolas Wright as Larry Coyle, a Vancouver City Council member who endorses a waterfront casino proposal in exchange for the developer's assistance in supporting his own political ambitions to become a member of Parliament, only to then become aware that his every action is being followed by a cameraman that nobody else can see. The film's cast also includes Hilary Jardine, Lara Gilchrist, and Gerard Plunkett.

According to Sawers, the film was inspired by a desire to explore the concept of a film character who can see that he is being filmed.

Camera Shy premiered at the 2012 Vancouver International Film Festival. The film was nominated for Best British Columbia Film at the Vancouver Film Critics Circle Awards 2012. It won six Leo Awards in 2013, for Best Motion Picture, Best Director (Sawers), Best Supporting Actor (Plunkett), Best Screenwriting in a Feature Length Drama (Sawers and Doug Barber), Best Cinematography (Brian Johnson) and Best Musical Score (Don MacDonald).

== Cast ==
- Nicolas Wright as Larry Coyle
- Gerard Plunkett as Bob Sterling
- Crystal Balint as Jory Summer
- Hilary Jardine as Rebecca Hodges
- Fred Keating as Jim Weaver
- Ted Friend as news caster #1
- Lara Gilchrist as Jane Coyle
- Albert Trinh as Loc Coyle
- Elizabeth Nguyen as Giang Coyle
- Stephen Lobo as Dr. Chander
- David Nykl as Cliff Gardner
- Michael St. John Smith as Mayor Thomas
- Sean Amsing as city hall staffer
- Yann Bernaquez as Jean-Paul
- C. Ernst Harth as Daryl
- Sean Carey as workman
- Adrien Dorval as contractor
- Stefano Giulianetti as news cameraman
