= A Kind of Family =

1992 film by Andrew Koster

A Kind of Family is a Canadian documentary film, directed by Andrew Koster and released in 1992. The film centres on Glen Murray, at the time a Winnipeg City Councillor and one of Canada's first openly gay politicians, and Mike, a gay, HIV-positive street kid whom Murray took in as a foster parent and then adopted him.

The film received limited theatrical distribution before being broadcast by CBC Television as an episode of the Witness documentary series. It received a Genie Award nomination for Best Short Documentary at the 13th Genie Awards.
