= North of Pittsburgh =

- Film poster
- Directed by: Richard Martin
- Written by: Jeff Schultz
- Produced by: Cal Shumiatcher; Kim Steer
- Starring: Jeff Schultz; Viveca Lindfors
- Cinematography: Tobias Schliessler
- Edited by: Bruce Lange
- Music by: Graeme Coleman
- Release date: December 11, 1992
- Running time: 98 minutes
- Country: Canada
- Language: English

North of Pittsburgh is a Canadian comedy-drama film, directed by Richard Martin and released in 1992.

The film stars Jeff Schultz as Tony Andretti, an aimless slacker living in Pittsburgh who supports himself smuggling marijuana to Canada. After bungling a delivery and being forced to go on the run, he decides to take his estranged grandmother Rosa (Viveca Lindfors) on a quest to seek financial compensation for her husband's death of black lung disease after a lifetime working as a coal miner. Martin's father, comedian Dick Martin, also has a small role in the film as the president of the coal mining company. The film's cast also includes John Cassini, Jay Brazeau, Robert Clothier, James Purcell and Babz Chula.

The film was shot primarily in Vancouver, British Columbia, with some location shooting in Pittsburgh.

== Award nominations ==
The film garnered seven Genie Award nominations at the 13th Genie Awards in 1992:

- Best Actress: Viveca Lindfors
- Best Original Screenplay: Jeff Schultz
- Best Overall Sound: Dean Giammarco, Patrick Ramsay, Paul A. Sharpe and Bill Sheppard
- Best Editing: Bruce Lange
- Best Sound Editing: Charles O'Shea, Shane Shemko, Cal Shumiatcher, Alison Grace and Marti Richa
- Best Original Song: Cam Wagner, "Midnight Ride"
- Best Original Score: Graeme Coleman
