= Yvon Rivard =

Canadian writer from Quebec (born 1945)

Yvon Rivard (born August 20, 1945 at Sainte-Thècle, Quebec) is a Canadian writer from Quebec. He is a two-time Governor General's Award winner, receiving the Governor General's Award for French-language fiction in 1986 for Les silences du corbeau, and the Governor General's Award for French-language non-fiction in 2013 for Aimer, enseigner.

He was a longtime professor of creative writing at McGill University until his retirement in 2008.

He won the Grand Prix du livre de Montréal in 1996 for his novel Le Milieu du jour. As a screenwriter, he received a Genie Award nomination for Best Adapted Screenplay at the 13th Genie Awards in 1992 for Phantom Life (La Vie fantôme), cowritten with Jacques Leduc.

In 2025, he was the recipient of the Prix Athanase-David for his body of work.

== Works ==
- Pierre Vadeboncœur, un homme libre (1974)
- Mort et naissance de Christophe Ulric (1976)
- Frayère (1976)
- L'Imaginaire et le quotidien (1978)
- Les Silences du corbeau (1986, ISBN 2-89052-167-2)
- Le Bout cassé de tous les chemins (1993, ISBN 2-89052-554-6)
- Le Milieu du jour (1995, ISBN 2-89052-726-3)
- L'Ombre et le Double (1996, ISBN 2-89052-762-X)
- Le Siècle de Jeanne (2005, ISBN 2-7646-0321-5)
- Personne n'est une île, (2006, ISBN 978-2-7646-0467-0)
- Une idée simple (2010, ISBN 978-2-7646-2026-7)
- Aimer, enseigner (2012, ISBN 978-2-7646-2204-9)
