= No Men Beyond This Point =

2015 film

- Film poster
- Directed by: Mark Sawers
- Written by: Mark Sawers
- Starring: Patrick Gilmore
- Distributed by: Samuel Goldwyn Films
- Release date: 27 January 2015 (IFFR)
- Running time: 80 minutes
- Country: Canada
- Language: English

No Men Beyond This Point is a 2015 Canadian comedy film directed by Mark Sawers. It was shown in the Vanguard section of the 2015 Toronto International Film Festival and acquired for distribution by Samuel Goldwyn Films (worldwide rights excluding Canada).

== Plot ==
The film is a science fiction mockumentary set in an alternate timeline several decades after a near-Earth object almost hit Earth in 1952 which rapidly accelerated human evolution, making it possible for women to reproduce asexually, via parthenogenesis, without men. The sex of a child produced asexually can only be female, and due to this evolution, sperm cannot naturally implant itself in embryos anymore, causing men to no longer be born, and become a dying breed. Following a feminist revolution, and the establishment of a female-led world government, men have disappeared from all important positions. The remaining men are kept on maximum-security reserves and are no longer part of society, with the exception of a few men who are allowed to do menial work. It is now up to the quiet and modest household helper Andrew Myers to ensure that the male gender does not go extinct. The 37-year-old is the youngest living man on Earth and works for a family made up entirely of women.

== Cast ==
- Patrick Gilmore as Andrew Myers
- Kristine Cofsky as Iris Balashev
- Tara Pratt as Terra Granger
- Cameron McDonald as Darius Smith
- Morgan Taylor Campbell as Dahlia Granger
- Rekha Sharma as Ajala Bhatt
- Mary Black as Helen Duvall
- Ken Kramer as Gordon Trescott

== Accolades ==
At the 2015 Vancouver International Film Festival, the BC Spotlight jury offered an honourable mention to No Men Beyond This Point in the Best BC Film category. At the 2015 Other Worlds Austin SciFi Film Festival, No Men Beyond This Point won the Best Feature Audience Award and also won “Cthulhies” for Feature Script, Feature Actor, and Feature Editing.
