= Gabriella Martinelli =

Canadian film and television producer

- Born: Italy
- Education: Carleton University; University of Victoria
- Occupations: film and television producer
- Known for: Capri Films Inc. (president & CEO)
- Website: martinellifilms.com

Gabriella Martinelli is a Canadian film and television producer. She is president and CEO of Toronto-based Capri Films Inc., a vertically integrated production and distribution company that she founded in 2000.

Born in Italy, Martinelli emigrated to Canada with her family when she was a child. She studied art history and film at Carleton University in Ottawa and at the University of Victoria in British Columbia. From 1980 to 1984, Martinelli produced and served as production manager on television commercials and TV variety specials. She went on to coordinate the Canadian feature films Walls and My American Cousin. Martinelli went on from there to work as head of production for the Toronto-based Independent Pictures, serving as associate producer on John and the Missus and co-producer of Milk and Honey.

Martinelli's producing credits also include Baz Luhrmann's Romeo + Juliet, David Cronenberg's Naked Lunch and M. Butterfly, Clive Barker's Nightbreed (including the documentary), Between Strangers, starring Sophia Loren and Pete Postlethwaite, and Journey to Enlightenment, based on the life of Dilgo Khyente Rinposhce, a revered teacher of the Dalai Lama with narration by Richard Gere and music supervision by Philip Glass.

In 2005, Martinelli co-produced Terry Gilliam's Tideland with Jeremy Thomas of the UK's The Recorded Picture Company. In 2009, Martinelli was executive producer of Suck, a rock 'n' roll vampire comedy.

For television, Martinelli produced the highly successful two-part, four-hour mini-series Lives of the Saints (inspired by the Nino Ricci novel), a co-production with the CTV Network in Canada and RTI in Italy, directed by Jerry Ciccoritti, and starring Sophia Loren, Sabrina Ferilli, Kris Kristofferson, Nick Mancuso, Jessica Paré and Fabrizio Filippo. The mini-series played to record audiences in both countries and was nominated for three Gemini Awards.

Capri Films also includes a live theatre division. In 2003, Martinelli produced (in association with David and Ed Mirvish Productions) Scaramouche Jones, an award-winning one-man show starring Pete Postlethwaite.
