= Richard Martin (Canadian director) =

Canadian director

Richard James Martin (born April 12, 1956) is a Canadian film and television director and editor, most noted for his 1992 film North of Pittsburgh.

The biological son of American comedian Dick Martin from a brief relationship with Canadian dancer Doreen Laverick, he was born and raised in Vancouver, British Columbia, by his mother and stepfather Norman Esary. He began his career making experimental short films, and working as an editor. He received a Genie Award nomination for Best Editing at the 7th Genie Awards in 1986, for his work on the film Samuel Lount.

He made his debut as a director with the 1989 horror film Matinee, and followed up with the comedy film North of Pittsburgh in 1992.

== Filmography ==
=== Film ===
Director

- Poison Ivy (1979)
- Diminished (1980)
- Matinee (1989) (Also writer)
- North of Pittsburgh (1992)
- White Tiger (1996)
- Wounded (1997)
- Air Bud: Golden Receiver (1998)
- Slap Shot 3: The Junior League (2008)
- Apart (2009)
- Backbone: Vancouver Experimental Cinema (2013)
- Abcam (2016)
- South Lakewood North (2017)

Editor

- Samuel Lount (1985)
- The Outside Chance of Maximilian Glick (1988)
- Whale Music (1994)

=== Television ===
- Ninja Turtles: The Next Mutation 1997 (2 episodes)
- Highlander: The Series (1997-98) (9 episodes)
- Beggars and Choosers 1999 (1 episode)
- The New Addams Family (1999) (4 episodes)
- Hollywood Off Ramp (2000) (9 episodes)
- Queen of Swords (2000) (2 episodes)
- Spinning Out of Control (2001) (TV film)
- The Chris Isaak Show (2001) (1 episode)
- Tracker (2001) (1 episode)
- Mysterious Ways (2001-02) (2 episodes)
- The Sausage Factory (2002) (1 episode)
- Just Cause (2002) (1 episode)
- Beware of Dog (2002) (2 episodes)
- Da Vinci's Inquest (2003) (1 episode)
- Young Blades (2005) (3 episodes)

== Sources ==
- Richard Martin at IMDb
