= Mount Royal College Cougars =

- City: Calgary, Alberta
- League: Alberta Junior Hockey League
- Founded: 1970

Franchise history
- 1970–1972: Mount Royal College Cougars

The Mount Royal College Cougars were a junior "A" ice hockey team in the Alberta Junior Hockey League (AJHL) based in Calgary, Alberta, Canada.

== History ==
The Mount Royal College Cougars joined the AJHL for the 1970–71 season. The team played two seasons in the league before moving to the Alberta Colleges Athletics Conference following 1971–72 season.

== Season-by-season record ==
Note: GP = games played, W = wins, L = losses, OTL = overtime losses, Pts = points, GF = goals for, GA = goals against, PIM = penalties in minutes

Season	GP	W	L	OTL	Pts	GF	GA	PIM	Finish	Playoffs
1970–71
1971–72

== See also ==
- List of ice hockey teams in Alberta
