= Hercules Bellville =

American film producer

- Hercules Bellville from his 1976 World Service Authority passport
- Born: June 18, 1939; San Diego, US
- Died: February 21, 2009 (aged 69); London, England
- Resting place: Highgate Cemetery
- Occupation: Producer
- Parent(s): Rupert Bellville, Jeannette Stafford Fuqua
- Relatives: Stephen O. Fuqua (grandfather)

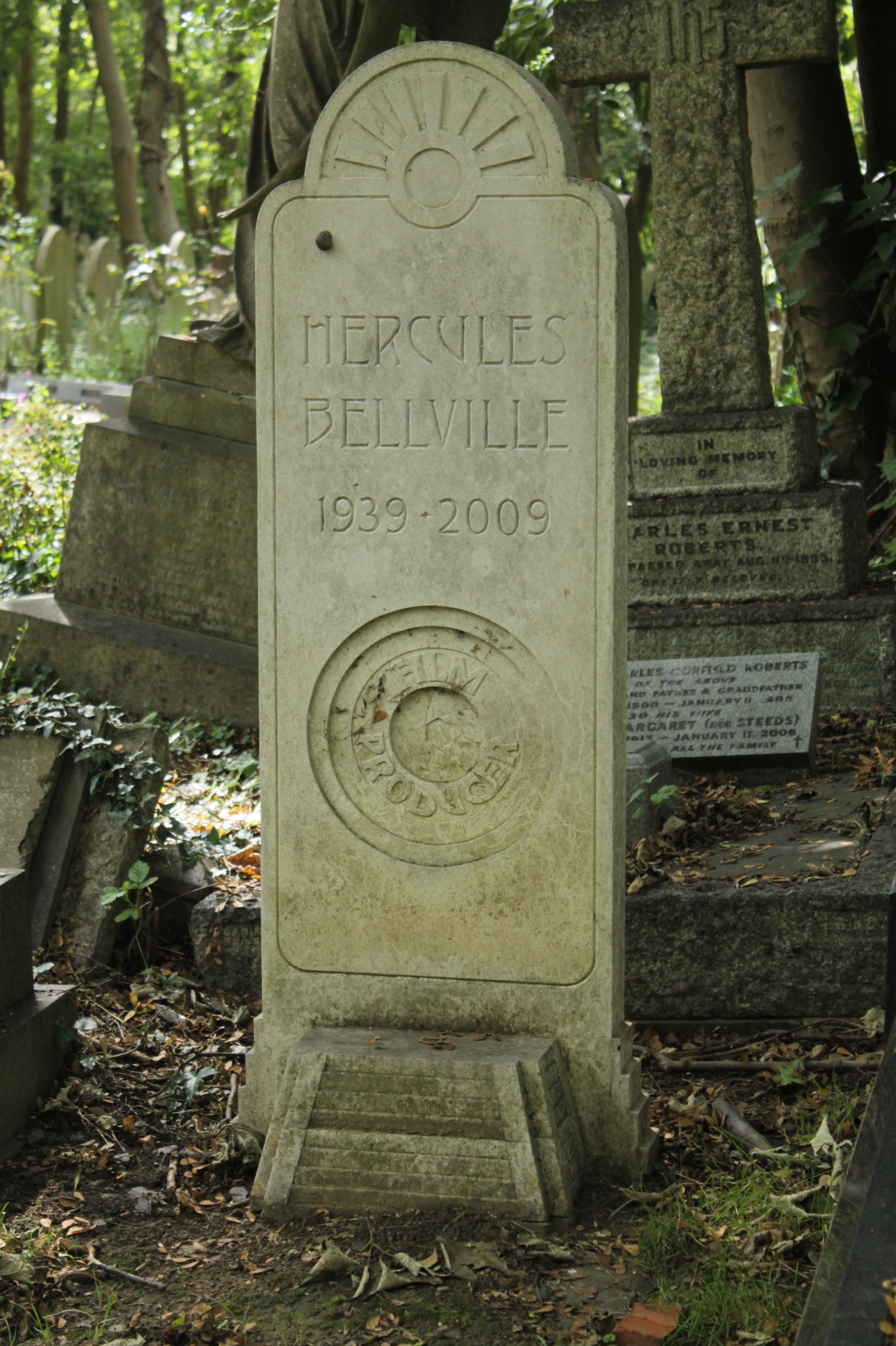
Bellville's grave at Highgate Cemetery in north London

Hercules Bellville (June 18, 1939 – February 21, 2009) was an American film producer. Working with Jeremy Thomas at London's Recorded Picture Company for much of his later career, he was an associate producer on The Dreamers and Sexy Beast, and the co-producer of Blood and Wine. Formerly Bellville had been employed as Roman Polanski's assistant director on many films, working with the director in a creative capacity for over a decade. Bellville was an associate producer on Polanski's The Tenant, and it is his hands that come through the wall to menace Catherine Deneuve in Repulsion.

== Life ==
He was born in San Diego, California on 18 June 1939, the son of Rupert Bellville and his wife Jeanie Fuqua. The family moved to England around 1941 where his father became a test pilot. His parents divorced and Hercules was sent to Ampleforth College in Yorkshire.

He spent the summer of 1956 travelling in Spain with Ernest Hemingway and the bullfighter, Cayetano Ordóñez. On his return to England he began his studies in French and Spanish at Christ Church, Oxford. In 1964 he met Roman Polanski and was offered a post as his assistant, working on the film "Repulsion" and then on "Cul de Sac". Only from 1971 did he start to receive screen credits for MacBeth (1971), What? (1972) and Tess (1978), each as second unit director. In 1976 he was associate producer of "The Tenant".

After a long period as assistant director on various film projects in 1984 he joined Jeremy Thomas in London as a "cultural ambassador".

He was diagnosed with cancer in the winter of 2007/8 and appeared to be cured but the disease reappeared in the winter of 2008/9. He married Ilana Shulman on 19 February 2009 and died two days later. He is buried in East Highgate Cemetery on the south side of the main through path.

== Filmography ==
=== Assistant Director ===
- The Passenger (1975)
- Pirates (1976 but abandoned and eventually released in 1986)
- The First Deadly Sin (abandoned)
- Hurricane (1979)
- Being There (1979)
- The Postman Always Rings Twice (1981)

=== Producer ===
- The Dreamers (2003)
- Sexy Beast (2000)
- All the Little Animals (1998)
- Blood and Wine (1996)
- Strangers Kiss (1983)

== Sources ==
- Hercules Bellville at IMDb
- McCarthy, Todd (February 24, 2009). "Producer Hercules Bellville dies".
- "Hercules Bellville: Much-loved film producer who worked with Polanski". Independent.co.uk. March 2, 2009.
