= Shoes Off! =

- Directed by: Mark Sawers
- Written by: Mark Sawers
- Produced by: Leah Mallen
- Starring: David Lewis; Deanna Milligan
- Cinematography: John Houtman
- Edited by: Michelle Floyd
- Music by: Don MacDonald
- Production company: Mark Sawers Productions
- Distributed by: AtomFilms
- Release date: September 13, 1998 (TIFF)
- Running time: 13 minutes
- Country: Canada
- Language: English

Shoes Off! is a Canadian short comedy film, directed by Mark Sawers and released in 1998. The film stars David Lewis as Stuart, a man who becomes entranced with a woman (Deanna Milligan) he meets in an elevator wearing a sexy pair of boots, but is too shy to talk to her. Some time later, he sees her again getting out of a taxi at a house party and decides to follow her in so he can finally meet her; however, his efforts are complicated by the hosts' "shoes off" policy, both because he has a hole in his sock and because he had paid more attention to the woman's boots than her face and thus struggles to identify who he's looking for.

The cast also includes Kurt Max Runte and Marcus Hondro as other occupants of the elevator, Richard Side and Jane Sowerby as the couple hosting the party, and Ken Tremblett, Suzin Schiff, Michael Cram, J. Douglas Stuart, Deshka Penoff and Lesley Ewen as other party guests.

The film features an operatic score composed by Don MacDonald, and performed by Colin Balzar and Alison Girvan.

== Distribution ==
The film premiered at the 1998 Toronto International Film Festival, and was subsequently screened in the International Critics' Week program at the 1999 Cannes Film Festival.

It received a brief theatrical run as the opening film to some Canadian screenings of the feature film Besieged. It was subsequently broadcast by CBC Television as an episode of Canadian Reflections.

== Awards ==
The film was a Genie Award nominee for Best Live Action Short Drama at the 19th Genie Awards in 1999.

At Cannes, the film won the Canal+ Award.
