= Mark Sawers =

Canadian film and television director

- Education: University of British Columbia
- Occupations: Film director, writer

Mark Sawers is a Canadian film director and writer. Best known for his feature films Camera Shy and No Men Beyond This Point, he is also a four-time Genie Award nominee for Best Live Action Short Drama for his films Stroke at the 13th Genie Awards, Hate Mail at the 14th Genie Awards, Shoes Off! at the 19th Genie Awards and Lonesome Joe at the 24th Genie Awards.

Shoes Off also won the Canal+ Award at the 1999 Cannes Film Festival.

As a television director, his credits have included segments of The Kids in the Hall, and episodes of Alienated, Alice, I Think, About a Girl, The Assistants, Mr. Young and Anticlimax.

From Vancouver, British Columbia, Sawers is a graduate of the University of British Columbia.

== Filmography ==
- Absolute Trash: A Recycling Story - 1980
- The Middle Child - 1989
- Stroke - 1992
- Hate Mail - 1993
- Shoes Off! - 1998
- Lonesome Joe - 2002
- Exposed - 2010
- Camera Shy - 2012
- No Men Beyond This Point - 2015
- Call from Josie - 2017
