= Death of a Ladies' Man (film) =

2020 Canadian comedy-drama film

- Film poster
- Directed by: Matt Bissonnette
- Written by: Matt Bissonnette
- Produced by: Corey Marr; Don Carmody; Martina Niland; Marie-Claude Poulin
- Starring: Gabriel Byrne; Jessica Paré; Brian Gleeson
- Cinematography: Jonathon Cliff
- Edited by: Matt Lyon
- Music by: Stephen Rennicks
- Production companies: Corey Marr Productions; Don Carmody Productions; MCP Productions; Port Pictures; Monte Rosso Films
- Distributed by: Mongrel Media (Canada)
- Release date: September 24, 2020 (CIFF)
- Running time: 100 minutes
- Countries: Canada; Ireland
- Languages: English, French

Death of a Ladies' Man is a 2020 Canadian-Irish coproduced black comedy-drama film, directed by Matt Bissonnette. The film stars Gabriel Byrne as Samuel O'Shea, a college literature professor in Montreal who must confront his mortality and make peace with his family after a series of hallucinations lead to his diagnosis with an inoperable brain tumour.

The film's cast also includes Jessica Paré, Brian Gleeson, Antoine Olivier Pilon, Karelle Tremblay, Suzanne Clément, Joel Bissonnette, Pascale Bussières, Alexandre Nachi and Tyrone Benskin.

The film's themes are reflected through the use of seven Leonard Cohen songs in its musical soundtrack: "Bird on the Wire", "Memories", "Hallelujah", "Why Don't You Try", "Heart with No Companion", "The Lost Canadian (Un Canadien errant)" and "Did I Ever Love You". The use of Cohen's literary or musical work is a recurring motif in Bissonnette's work, also seen in his 2002 filmmaking debut Looking for Leonard and his 2009 film Passenger Side. The film shares the title of Cohen's 1977 album of the same name.

The film premiered on September 24, 2020 at the Calgary International Film Festival, and went into commercial release in Canada in theatres and on video on demand platforms on March 12, 2021.
