= Molly Parker =

Canadian actress (born 1972)

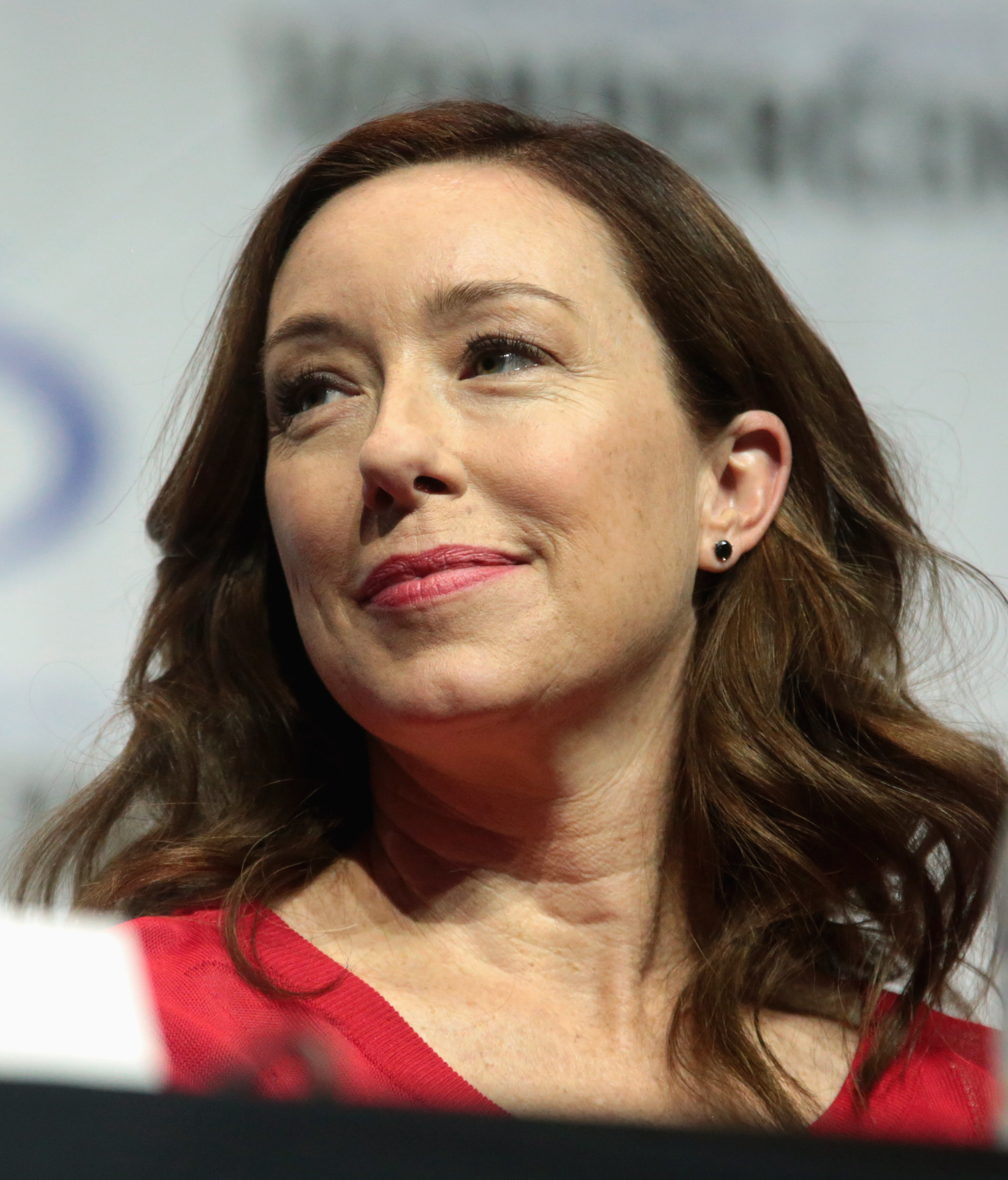
- Parker at WonderCon 2018
- Born: June 30, 1972 (age 54); Maple Ridge, British Columbia, Canada
- Occupations: Actress; writer; director
- Years active: 1991–present
- Spouse: Matt Bissonnette (m. 2002; div. 2016)
- Children: 1

Molly Parker (born June 30, 1972) is a Canadian actress, writer, and director. She garnered critical attention for her portrayal of a necrophiliac medical student in the controversial drama Kissed (1996). She subsequently starred in the television thriller Intensity (1997) before landing her first major American film role in the drama Waking the Dead (2000). She gained further notice for her role as a Las Vegas escort in the drama The Center of the World (2001), for which she was nominated for the Independent Spirit Award for Best Female Lead.

In the early 2000s, Parker had lead roles in several films, including Max (2002), Pure (2002), and Nine Lives (2005). Beginning in 2004, she starred as Alma Garret on the HBO Western series Deadwood, appearing in all three seasons. She subsequently appeared in the post-apocalyptic thriller The Road (2009), and the independent drama Trigger (2010). In 2011, she appeared as a recurring guest star in the sixth season of Dexter, before being cast as politician Jacqueline Sharp on the Netflix series House of Cards in 2014. The role earned Parker a nomination for the Primetime Emmy Award for Outstanding Guest Actress in a Drama Series.

Her subsequent film roles include the drama American Pastoral (2016) and two Netflix-produced features: the crime drama Small Crimes, and the Stephen King adaptation 1922 (both 2017). She also starred in Errol Morris's docudrama miniseries Wormwood. From 2018 to 2021, she starred as Maureen Robinson in Lost in Space, a Netflix-produced remake of the 1965 TV series. In January 2025 she began her lead role as Dr. Amy Larsen in the Fox medical drama Doc.

== Early life and education ==
Parker was born 30 June 1972 in Maple Ridge, British Columbia, Canada, and spent her childhood on a farm in Pitt Meadows. She has one younger brother, Henry. Parker's parents, whom she has described as "hippies," operated a seafood store. Parker trained in ballet from ages 3 to 17, and spent three years performing with the Royal Winnipeg Ballet Company.

She began acting in local productions at age 14. Her uncle's agent represented her early in her career, when she had parts in various Canadian television roles before studying with Vancouver's Gastown Actors' Studio.

== Career ==
=== 1991–2001: early work and breakthrough ===
In 1993, she had a supporting role in the Corey Haim-led teen comedy Just One of the Girls. She also appeared in the television thriller film The Substitute, in a supporting role. Parker portrayed Alice Ramsey in "The Wrath of Kali" (1995), a fourth-season episode of Highlander: The Series. She played the daughter of Margarethe Cammermeyer, a lesbian military officer, in the television film Serving in Silence (1995), opposite Glenn Close and Judy Davis. She also appeared in a minor role as a nurse in the Western Last of the Dogmen (1995), as well as the Lifetime holiday television film Ebbie (also 1995) playing the niece (and sister) of Susan Lucci's Scrooge character, in a modern retelling of Charles Dickens's A Christmas Carol. She then won a Gemini Award nomination for her performance in the Canadian television film Paris or Somewhere. The following year, Parker had her breakthrough portraying a necrophiliac medical student in Lynne Stopkewich's controversial film Kissed (1996). The film saw Parker win the Genie Award for Best Actress that year. Also in 1996, Parker appeared in an episode of the Canadian horror series Poltergeist: The Legacy, as well as Bruce McDonald's independent film Hard Core Logo, in which she portrayed an aspiring actress. In 1997, Parker starred as Chyna Shepard, a kidnap victim, in the television horror-thriller film Intensity, an adaptation of the Dean Koontz novel.

Beginning in 1998, she was cast in the surrealist Canadian sitcom Twitch City, which aired for two seasons. She subsequently appeared as a pregnant woman in Michael Winterbottom's Wonderland (1999), and in the historical drama Sunshine (also 1999), playing a Hungarian Jew during World War II. She also co-starred with Charlotte Gainsbourg and Nastassja Kinski in the Canadian-British thriller film The Intruder, about a woman who murders her husband's lover.

Parker's first major American film was the drama Waking the Dead (2000), in which she co-starred with Billy Crudup and Jennifer Connelly, playing the socialite girlfriend of a political candidate. The same year, Parker reunited with Lynne Stopkewich for the drama Suspicious River (2000) in which she portrayed a rape victim. For her performance, Parker was nominated for a Leo-Award for Best Actress. She also starred in The War Bride (2001), which earned her a Genie Award nomination for Best Supporting Actress. The same year, Parker appeared in the low-budget independent film The Center of the World, directed by Wayne Wang, in which she starred as a stripper who accompanies a man (played by Peter Sarsgaard) on a weekend in Las Vegas for $10,000. Parker gained critical notice for the film, earning an Independent Spirit Award nomination for Best Female Lead.

=== 2002–2009: mainstream success ===
In 2002, Parker appeared opposite Keira Knightley in the drama film Pure, portraying a mother suffering from heroin addiction. The same year, she had a supporting role in the thriller Max, starring John Cusack and Noah Taylor, and also guest-starred in two episodes of the HBO series Six Feet Under, playing a rabbi. Also in 2002, Parker married her first husband, writer and director Matthew Bissonette, and was one of the executive producers of his debut feature film Looking for Leonard.

Parker starred opposite Christian Slater in the drama The Good Shepherd (2004). Derek Elley of Variety praised the performances, writing: "Slater and Parker make a sharp pair of leads, each handling their dialogue with crisp efficiency." The same year, she starred in the historical drama Iron Jawed Angels, opposite Hilary Swank and Frances O'Connor, which charts the lives of several suffragists, including Alice Paul and Lucy Burns.

Also in 2004, she was cast in the leading role of Alma Garret, a widow in 1870s South Dakota, on the HBO Western series Deadwood. Parker portrayed the role for the series' three seasons, which saw a Screen Actors Guild Award nomination for Best Ensemble in 2007. In October 2006, during the airing of Deadwood's final season, Parker gave birth to her first child, a son, William, in Los Angeles. During her tenure on Deadwood, Parker also worked in film, appearing in the drama Nine Lives (2005), an anthology film in which she starred opposite Holly Hunter, Stephen Dillane, and Jason Isaacs in a short about a feuding couple.

The following year, she appeared as a cultist in Neil LaBute's remake of The Wicker Man (2006). She also appeared in a supporting part in the period drama Hollywoodland, and the comedic drama Who Loves the Sun (also 2006), the latter of which was directed by Parker's then-husband, Matthew Bissonnette.

In 2008, Parker starred in the CBS show Swingtown, a 1970s-set relationship drama, which aired for one season. The following year, she guest-starred in one episode of Party Down, and subsequently appeared in a supporting role in the post-apocalyptic thriller The Road, playing a woman trying to survive after an apocalyptic event. In 2009, Parker separated from her husband, Bissonnette and later divorced.

=== 2010–present: television and other projects ===
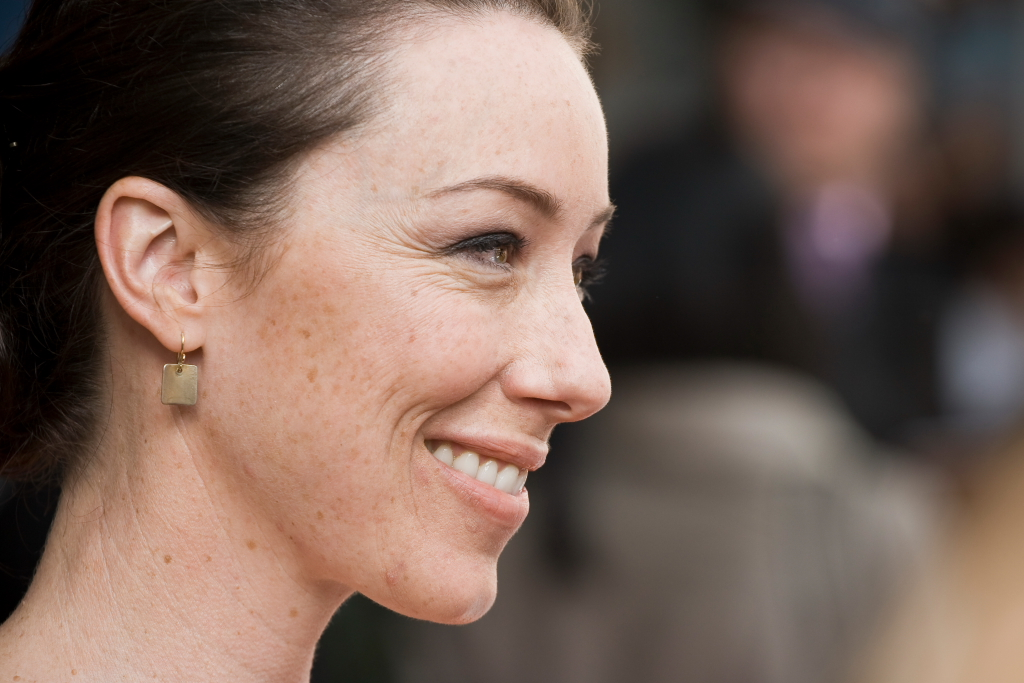
Parker at the 2010 Toronto International Film Festival

In 2010, Parker starred in the Canadian police procedural Shattered, which also aired for a single season, and had a lead role in the independent drama Trigger, opposite Tracy Wright, in her final film appearance before her death. The following year, she had a guest-starring role on several episodes of the sixth season of the Showtime series Dexter. Parker followed this with more television work, starring as Abby McDeere on the thriller series The Firm (2012), an adaptation of the John Grisham 1991 novel and its 1993 film adaptation. Parker also appeared as Pauline Pfeiffer, second wife of Ernest Hemingway, in the Philip Kaufman-directed HBO television film Hemingway & Gellhorn (2012), starring opposite Clive Owen (as Hemingway) and Nicole Kidman (as Martha Gellhorn).

In 2014, she appeared as Congresswoman Jacqueline Sharp in the second season of the Netflix series House of Cards. Parker continued in the role in seasons 3 and 4. For her performance in the fourth season, Parker was nominated for a Primetime Emmy Award for Outstanding Guest Actress in a Drama Series. In early 2015, Parker appeared in a Toronto stage production of the Simon Stephens play Harper Regan. Parker was subsequently cast alongside Jamie Dornan, Sarah Gadon, and Aaron Paul in the supernatural thriller The 9th Life of Louis Drax (2016), directed by Alexandre Aja. Also in 2016, Parker co-starred in the Amazon Studios legal series Goliath, as well as Bruce McDonald's independent drama film Weirdos, for which she won the Vancouver Film Critics Circle Award for Best Supporting Actress and the Canadian Screen Award for Best Supporting Actress. She also had a supporting role as a therapist in Ewan McGregor's American Pastoral, based on the 1997 Philip Roth novel of the same name. In October 2016, Parker divorced her husband, Bissonnete, after a protracted seven-year-separation.

In 2017, Parker appeared in three productions for Netflix: First, she starred opposite Nikolaj Coster-Waldau and Gary Cole in the crime film Small Crimes (2017), playing a nurse who becomes romantically involved with a former police officer. She also starred in the horror film 1922, a film adaptation of the Stephen King novella of the same name, playing the wife of a farmer in 1920s Nebraska; this was followed with a lead role in Errol Morris's miniseries Wormwood, based on the life of scientist Frank Olson. The same year, Parker made her debut as a director and writer with the short film Birds, which premiered at the 2017 Toronto International Film Festival, where it competed for the festival's Short Cuts award.

Parker co-starred in Josephine Decker's 2018 feature film Madeline's Madeline. Beginning in 2018, Parker appeared as Maureen Robinson in Lost in Space, the Netflix remake of the 1965 TV series. Parker reprised her role of Alma Garret for the HBO television film Deadwood: The Movie, released in May 2019. In March 2021, it was announced that she would be playing Mrs. Darling in Disney+'s Peter Pan & Wendy. In January 2025 she began her lead role as Dr. Amy Larsen in the Fox medical drama Doc.

== Sources ==
- Pratley, Gerald (2003). A Century of Canadian Cinema: Gerald Pratley's Feature Film Guide, 1900 to the Present. Toronto, Ontario: Lynx Images. ISBN 978-1-894-07321-9.
- Solski, Ruth (2009). Famous Female Actors Gr. 4-8. Napanee, Ontario: On The Mark Press. ISBN 978-1-770-72777-9.
