= Century Hotel =

2001 film by David Weaver and Bridget Newson

- DVD cover
- Directed by: David Weaver
- Written by: David Weaver; Bridget Newson
- Produced by: Victoria Hirst
- Starring: Joel Bissonnette; Lindy Booth; Albert Chung
- Cinematography: David Greene
- Edited by: Christopher Donaldson; David Wharnsby
- Music by: Ron Sures
- Distributed by: Victorious Films
- Release date: 2001
- Running time: 97 minutes
- Country: Canada
- Language: English
- Budget: $750,000 CAD (estimated)

Century Hotel is a 2001 Canadian drama/mystery/romance film. It is directed and co-written by David Weaver and Bridget Newson.

The film explains seven different stories, that happen in the same hotel room in different eras, from the 1920s to the 1990s. The stories are not told one after the other, but interspersed.

== Cast ==
- Joel Bissonnette as Danny
- Lindy Booth as Supergirl / Sylvia
- Albert Chung as Cheung
- Colm Feore as Sebastian
- David Hewlett as Michael
- Sandrine Holt as Jin
- Noam Jenkins as Young Salvatore
- Marvin Kaye as Hotel Manager
- Janet Kidder as Beth
- Mia Kirshner as Dominique
- Chantal Kreviazuk as Mary
- Eugene Lipinski as George
- Raine Maida as Damon Riley
- Jef Mallory as Police Officer
- Tom McCamus as Nicholas
- Michelle Nolden as Eloise
- Earl Pastko as Hotel Detective
- Jonathan Payne as Rory
- Jeremy Ratchford as The Nightfly
- Julian Richings as Waiter
- Aron Tager as Older Salvatore
- Russell Yuen as Xiang
