= Looking for Leonard =

- Directed by: Matt Bissonnette; Steven Clark
- Written by: Matt Bissonnette; Steven Clark
- Starring: Benjamin Ratner; Darcy Belsher; Kim Huffman; Joel Bissonnette
- Cinematography: Brian Pearson
- Edited by: Michael Dowse; Annie Ilkow; Andrew Kowalchuk
- Music by: Mac McCaughan
- Production companies: Boneyard Film Company; Frustrated Film
- Distributed by: Mongrel Media
- Release date: March 10, 2002 (SXSW)
- Running time: 87 minutes
- Country: Canada
- Language: English

Looking for Leonard is a Canadian crime comedy-drama film, directed by Matt Bissonnette and Steven Clark and released in 2002.

== Synopsis ==
The film stars Benjamin Ratner as Ted and Darcy Belsher as Johnny, an aimless pair of brothers in Montreal who regularly commit small-scale crimes with the help of Ted's girlfriend Jo (Kim Huffman). Jo, however, is more ambivalent about the trio's lifestyle, and spends most of her time reading Leonard Cohen's novel Beautiful Losers while entertaining fantasies of meeting and running off with Cohen to lead a more fulfilling and interesting life. Jo then meets Luka (Joel Bissonnette), an immigrant from the Czech Republic whom she becomes smitten with and begins to date; one day, however, a confrontation between Luka and Ted leaves Luka dead, forcing Ted into hiding while Jo has to protect him by lying to the police that Luka was the aggressor and Ted killed him in self-defense.

== Production ==
The film incorporates some footage from the 1965 documentary film Ladies and Gentlemen... Mr. Leonard Cohen. Clark described the decision to incorporate a Cohen motif in the film as symbolic, stating that "It grew out of that urban myth, where you'd hear people say, 'I saw Leonard buying smokes at the corner store,' or 'I saw Leonard womanizing at the bar'. It became an appropriate symbol for us. He's an icon, and our film relies on a lot of icons."

Executive producers on the film included actress Molly Parker, Matt Bissonnette's wife, and filmmaker Lynne Stopkewich.

The film premiered on March 10, 2002 at South by Southwest, and had its Canadian premiere at the Montreal World Film Festival on August 28.

== Critical response ==
For the Toronto Star, Geoff Pevere wrote that the film "trades in the kind of deadpan comic sullenness that's far closer to the mopey dopiness of Jim Jarmusch or Aki Kaurismäki than the romantic languor of Leonard Cohen." He compared the film to Jarmusch's Stranger Than Paradise, and concluded that "It's a case of the parts adding up to a hole: At its best (and it does have some very funny sequences) Looking for Leonard reminds you just how comically subversive silence can be."

For the National Post, Jeet Heer gave the film two and a half stars, writing that " Looking for Leonard demonstrates how far a film can go on sheer charm. Written and directed by Matt Bissonnette and Steven Clark, it looks like a movie financed entirely by over-strained credit cards. During long static scenes shot in the back alleys and diners, you can vicariously feel the scrounging and penny-pinching that went into every shot. Even though it is set in a big city, there are never any extras, so Montreal somehow becomes a ghost town. Yet the total lack of any cinematic glamour doesn't hurt the film at all. If anything, the scant budget contributes to the scruffy charm of the film. The movie nicely captures a milieu of downtrodden bohemians and small-fry crooks. It helps that all the actors are good, with Huffman putting in a particularly endearing performance."

Rick Groen of The Globe and Mail also rated the film two and a half stars, calling the decision to incorporate footage from Ladies and Gentlemen distracting but asserting that "Stay put, however, and you'll be treated to a lovely pensée where a character distinguishes between the "good and bad" people of the world: The good people wonder if they're bad, while the bad people know they're good. Judged by that standard, Looking for Leonard is good people—its vices are as modest as its virtues."

== Awards ==
Ratner won the Vancouver Film Critics Circle award for Best Supporting Actor in a Canadian Film at the Vancouver Film Critics Circle Awards 2002.
