= Laura Kasischke =

American fiction writer and poet (born 1961)

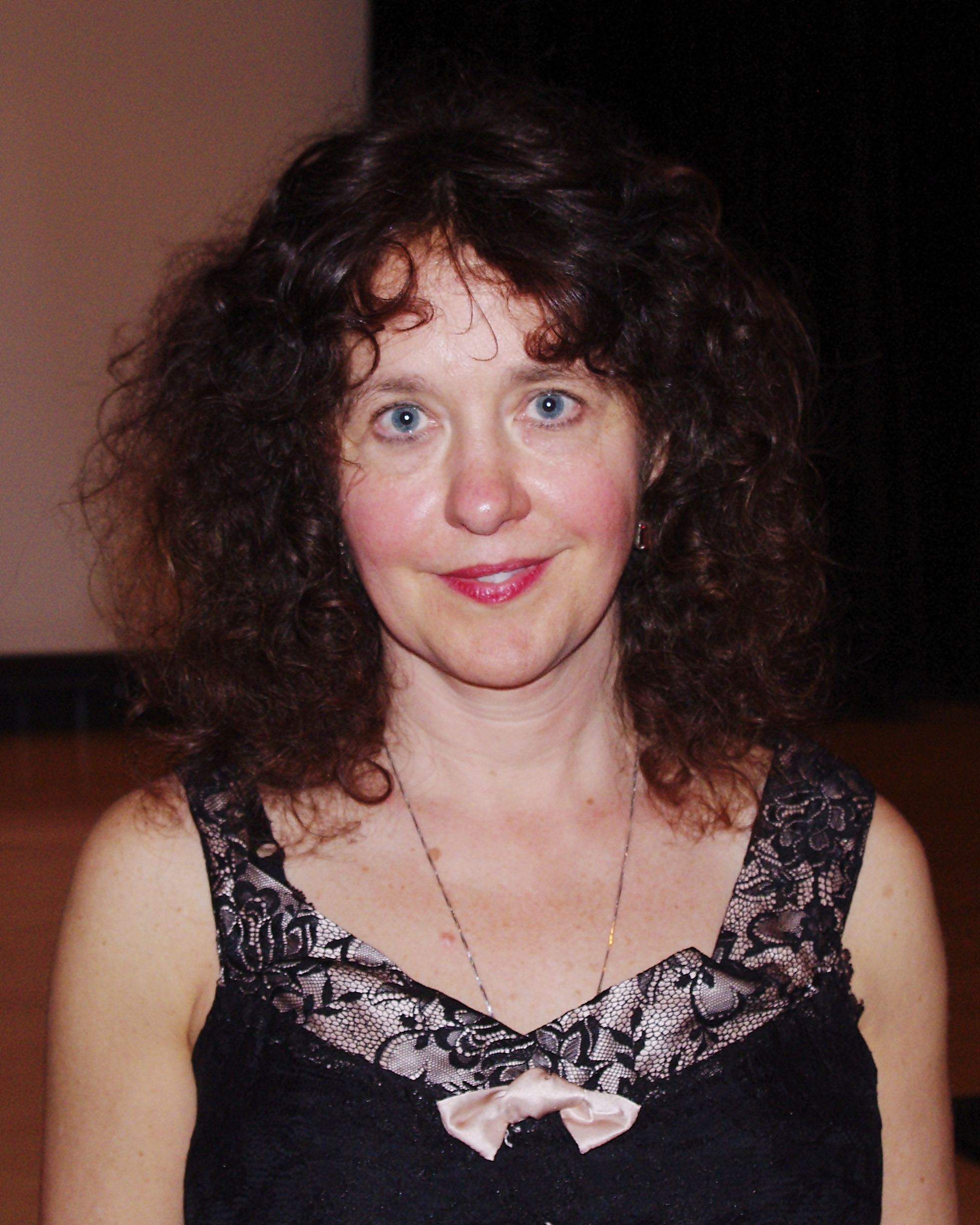
- Kasischke at the National Book Critics Circle Awards, March 2012
- Born: Grand Rapids, Michigan, U.S.
- Education: Columbia University; University of Michigan (MFA)
- Writing career
- Notable awards: National Book Critics Circle Award

Laura Kasischke is an American fiction writer and poet. She is best known for writing the novels Suspicious River, The Life Before Her Eyes and White Bird in a Blizzard, all of which have been adapted to film.

== Life and work ==
She was born in Grand Rapids, Michigan. Kasischke attended the University of Michigan (MFA 1987) and Columbia University. She lives in Chelsea, Michigan, with her husband and son.

She is the Theodore Roethke Distinguished University Professor of English Language and Literature, and of the Residential College at the University of Michigan in Ann Arbor, Michigan.

Kasischke's literary works have been recognized and highlighted at Michigan State University in their Michigan Writers Series.

Her novel The Life Before Her Eyes is the basis for the film of the same name, directed by Vadim Perelman and starring Uma Thurman and Evan Rachel Wood. Kasischke's work is particularly well received in France, where she is widely read in translation. Her novel A moi pour toujours (Be Mine) was published by Christian Bourgois, and was a national best seller.

Her book of poetry Where Now - New and Selected Poems, was published in 2017 by Copper Canyon Press.

== Awards ==
Kasischke was awarded the 2011 National Book Critics Circle Award in poetry for Space, In Chains. Her work has received the Juniper Prize, the Alice Fay di Castagnola Award from the Poetry Society of America, the Pushcart Prize, the Elmer Holmes Bobst Award for Emerging Writers, and the Beatrice Hawley Award. She is the recipient of two fellowships from the National Endowment for the Arts. In 2005 she was The Frost Place poet in residence and in 2009 she was awarded a Guggenheim Fellowship in Creative Arts - Poetry She received the 2014 Grand prix des lectrices de Elle.

== Bibliography ==
=== Poetry ===
- Brides, Wives, and Widows. American Studies Press. 1990. ISBN 093499658X.
- Kasischke, Laura (1991). Wild Brides. New York UP.
- — (1995). Housekeeping in a Dream. Carnegie Mellon University Press.
- Fire and Flower (Alice James Books, 1998)
- What It Wasn't (Carnegie Mellon University Press, 2002)
- Dance and Disappear. Univ of Massachusetts Press. 2002. ISBN 978-1-55849-352-0.
- Gardening in the Dark. Ausable Press. 2004. ISBN 978-1-931337-22-9.
- Lilies Without. Copper Canyon Press. 25 December 2012. ISBN 978-1-61932-072-7.
- Space, in Chains. Copper Canyon Press. 2011. ISBN 978-1-55659-333-8.
- The Infinitesimals (Copper Canyon Press, 2014) ISBN 1556594666
- Where Now: New and Selected Poems (Copper Canyon Press, 2017) ISBN 9781556595127
- Lightning Falls in Love. Copper Canyon Press. 21 September 2021. ISBN 978-1-55659-636-0.
- I Was Bonnie and Clyde. Copper Canyon Press. May 19, 2026. ISBN 978-1-55659-731-2.

=== Fiction ===
==== Novels ====
- Suspicious River. Houghton Mifflin. 1996.
- White Bird in a Blizzard. Hyperion. 1999. ISBN 978-0-7868-6366-2.
- The Life Before Her Eyes. Houghton Mifflin Harcourt. 11 November 2002. ISBN 978-0-547-54145-7.
- Boy Heaven. HarperCollins. 17 March 2009. ISBN 978-0-06-188057-5.
- Be Mine (Mariner Books, 2007) ISBN 9780547906843
- Feathered. HarperCollins. 5 May 2009. ISBN 978-0-06-190950-4.
- In a Perfect World. HarperCollins. 6 October 2009. ISBN 978-0-06-194182-5.
- Eden Springs. Made In Michigan Writers. Wayne State University Press. 2010. ISBN 978-0-8143-3533-8.
- The Raising: A Novel. HarperCollins. 15 March 2011. ISBN 978-0-06-204238-5.
- Mind of Winter. HarperCollins. 25 March 2014. ISBN 978-0-0622-8441-9.
- The Lifeguard. Red Hen Press. 12 May 2026. ISBN 978-1-63628-288-6.

==== Short story collections ====
- Kasischke, Laura (2013). If a stranger approaches you : stories. Sarabande Books.

==== Short stories ====
Title	Year	First published	Reprinted/collected
The barge	2011	Kasischke, Laura (Summer 2011). "The barge". The Florida Review. 35 (1&2): 179–184.	Kasischke, Laura (2013). "The barge". In Henderson, Bill (ed.). The Pushcart Prize XXXVII : best of the small presses 2013. Pushcart Press. pp. 340–344.
Search continues for elderly man	2008	Kasischke, Laura (Sep 2008). "Search continues for elderly man". F&SF. 115 (3): 57–61.	

=== Screenplays ===
- Suspicious River
