= Amateur (1994 film) =

1994 American independent crime comedy-drama thriller film by Hal Hartley

- Theatrical release poster
- Directed by: Hal Hartley
- Written by: Hal Hartley
- Produced by: Hal Hartley; Ted Hope
- Starring: Isabelle Huppert; Martin Donovan; Elina Löwensohn; Damian Young
- Cinematography: Michael Spiller
- Edited by: Steve Hamilton
- Music by: Jeffrey Taylor; Ned Rifle
- Production companies: Zenith Productions; True Fiction Pictures; UGC; American Playhouse Theatrical Films; La Sept Cinéma; Channel Four Films
- Distributed by: Sony Pictures Classics (United States); Artificial Eye (United Kingdom); Diaphana Films (France)
- Release dates: May 14, 1994 (Cannes); October 19, 1994 (France); January 6, 1995 (United Kingdom)
- Running time: 105 minutes
- Countries: United Kingdom; France; United States
- Language: English
- Budget: $2.3 million
- Box office: $757,088

Amateur is a 1994 American independent comedy-drama film written and directed by Hal Hartley and starring Isabelle Huppert, Martin Donovan, Elina Löwensohn, and Damian Young. The story revolves around a former nun, now a nymphomaniac (played by Huppert) who becomes embroiled in pornography, violence, and international crime.

== Plot ==
Still a virgin after 15 years in a convent, the demure Isabelle earns her living in New York City by writing pornography, which she researches by buying magazines and hiring videos. In a café, she befriends Thomas, who has amnesia after falling from a window. In another café, an accountant called Edward is befriended by Sofia, who pushed Thomas out of the window because, she says, he introduced her to drugs at the age of 12 and made her into a celebrated porn actress. She now wants revenge on Jacques, a crooked businessman for whom both Thomas and Edward worked. Learning from Edward that Thomas has data on disk that could destroy Jacques, she steals Jacques' phone number from Edward's address book while he is in the restroom. Upon returning, Edward gives her the address of a house upstate where she can hide. After contacting Jacques to blackmail him, she meets Edward at Grand Central Terminal, where he mentions that Sofia should not talk about the disks with anyone, since Jacques kills anyone who knows about them. Having agreed to meet one of Jacques' men at Grand Central to give him the address to her apartment where the disks are, Sofia urges Edward to come with her to the house upstate, afraid both Edward and she will end up being killed. She then leaves the station, only to see Jacques' hit men shoving Edward into a car. They take him to an abandoned building to torture him and leave him for dead.

Meanwhile, in a hired video, Thomas sees Sofia and his memory starts returning. With Isabelle, he retraces his steps and finds the flat where Sofia and he lived. Isabelle dresses in one of Sofia's costumes and is on the point of losing her virginity to him when someone enters and the two hastily hide. They are Jacques' hit men, looking for Sofia, who arrives shortly thereafter, only to be tied up by the hit men who begin to torture her. Bursting out, Thomas and Isabelle throw one hit man out of the window and, freeing Sofia, make off with her in the other hit man's car. Sofia suggests they head for the empty country cottage Edward had told her about. On the way, Isabelle posts the disks to her publisher, asking him to expose the evil of Jacques after having viewed the files while at the apartment.

When the surviving hit man traces them to the cottage, he wounds Sofia before being shot dead by Edward, who had arrived in a stolen car. The four make off before the police arrive, and Isabelle directs them to her former convent, where they are given sanctuary and the dying Sofia is tended, but the convent is surrounded by armed police, who want Edward for murder. Thomas, his conscience awakened by the kindness and care Isabelle has shown, by the realization of his criminal past, and by guilt over the fate of Sofia, walks out of the front gate and is killed instantly by a police marksman.

== Cast ==
- Isabelle Huppert as Isabelle
- Martin Donovan as Thomas
- Elina Löwensohn as Sofia
- Damian Young as Edward
- Chuck Montgomery as Jan, First Goon
- Dave Simonds as Kurt, Second Goon

== Soundtrack ==
Amateur

Soundtrack album by various artists
- Released: 1994
- Genre: Soundtrack
- Label: Matador

Professional ratings
Review scores
Source	Rating
Music Week	3/5 stars

The soundtrack features excerpts from various alternative artists:

- "Mind Full of Worry" – The Aquanettas
- "Only Shallow" – My Bloody Valentine
- "Water" – PJ Harvey
- "Japanese to English" – Red House Painters
- "Shaker" – Yo La Tengo
- "Tom Boy" – Bettie Serveert
- "Girls! Girls! Girls" – Liz Phair
- "Then Comes Dudley" – The Jesus Lizard
- "Here" – Pavement

The soundtrack also included original music by "Ned Rifle" (a pseudonym used by Hal Hartley) and Jeff Taylor. It was released by Matador Records.

== Release and reception ==
Amateur was screened at the Cannes Film Festival on May 14, 1994. It was released at the New York Film Festival on September 29, 1994. It was released in France on October 19, 1994 and in the United Kingdom on January 6, 1995.

On the review aggregator website Rotten Tomatoes, the film holds an approval rating of 79% based on 28 reviews, with an average rating of 6.1/10. Amateur won the Young Cinema Competition Silver Prize at the 1994 Tokyo International Film Festival.

=== Year-end lists ===
- 10th – Michael Mills, The Palm Beach Post

== See also ==
- Isabelle Huppert on screen and stage
