= Joel Bissonnette =

American-Canadian actor

- Born: Baltimore, Maryland, U.S.
- Education: Dawson College
- Occupation: Actor
- Relatives: Matt Bissonnette (brother)

Joel Bissonnette is a Canadian-American actor.

== Early life and education ==
Born in Baltimore, Maryland, Bissonnette was raised in Montreal, Quebec. He is a graduate of the Dawson College Theatre Program in Montreal.

== Career ==
Bissonnette is best known as Arnaud DeFöhn from the SciFi channel's show Invisible Man and was a lead in Canadian series Liberty Street.

He has appeared in the films Looking for Leonard, Century Hotel, Boulevard, Suspicious River, The Sum of All Fears, Fight Club, Darkman III, Language of the Heart, Fall, The Curious Case of Benjamin Button and Death of a Ladies' Man. In 2010, Bissonnette played the assassin Pavel Tokarev in the eighth season of the television series 24. In 2018, played Brian in the film Desert Shores for which he won the Best Actor Marcello Mastroianni Award at the Blow-Up Chicago International Arthouse Film Festival.

== Personal life ==
Bissonnette's brother is film director Matt Bissonnette.

== Filmography ==
=== Film ===
Year	Title	Role	Notes
1994	PCU	Sanskrit Major	
1994	April One	O.P Sniper	
1994	Boulevard	J-Rod	
1996	Darkman III: Die Darkman Die	Mayo	
1999	Fight Club	Food Court Maitre D'	
2000	Suspicious River	Rick Schmidt	
2001	Century Hotel	Danny	
2001	Heart of Stone	Detective Jones	
2002	Looking for Leonard	Luka	
2002	The Sum of All Fears	Jared Mason	
2005	Break a Leg	Not So Happy Actor	
2007	Zodiac	Inspector Kracke	
2008	The Curious Case of Benjamin Button	David Hernandez	
2009	Passenger Side	Tobey	
2014	Fall	Michael	
2017	The Dinner	Antonio	
2018	Salton Sea	Brian	
2020	Death of a Ladies' Man	Brendan	

=== Television ===
Year	Title	Role	Notes
1991	Street Legal	Waiter	Episode: "Sing for Me, Olivia"
1993	Beyond Reality	John Woodbridge	Episode: "Keepsake"
1993	Top Cops	Torres	Episode: "Clarence Comer/Scott Atwood/Charles Falzon"
1994	X-Rated	Mack Fischer	Television film
1994	TekWar: TekLab	Tristan / Mark Stewart	Television film
1994	Sirens	Richard	Episode: "The Needle and the Damage Done"
1995	Picture Windows	Mischa	Episode: "Language of the Heart"
1995	Prince for a Day	Sal	Television film
1995	Liberty Street	Mack Fischer	13 episodes
1995	Nancy Drew	Billy Feral	Episode: "The Death & Life of Billy Feral"
1996	Silk Stalkings	Alex Thorne	Episode: "Playing Doctor"
1997	A Nightmare Come True	Paul Chaney	Television film
1997	Arliss	Glenn Dapensil	Episode: "Truth and Responsibility"
1997	F/X: The Series	Carl	Episode: "House of Horrors"
1998	Psi Factor	Murphy Pomerance	Episode: "The Edge"
1999	Cracker	Ron Miller	Episode: "The Club"
2000–2002	The Invisible Man	Arnaud de Ferhn	9 episodes
2002	Push, Nevada	The Artist	2 episodes
2003	The Shield	Adam	Episode: "Breakpoint"
2003	Cold Case	Carl	Episode: "Our Boy Is Back"
2003	Miracles	John	Episode: "Battle at Shadow Ridge"
2004	CSI: Crime Scene Investigation	Bobby Jones	Episode: "Suckers"
2004	NYPD Blue	Eric Praegitzer	Episode: "Dress for Success"
2004	Veronica Mars	Jeremy Masterson	Episode: "Like a Virgin"
2005	The Inside	Amos	Episode: "Loneliest Number"
2005	Alias	Keach	2 episodes
2006	Without a Trace	Justin Pomeroy	Episode: "Expectations"
2006	Standoff	Baron Lent	Episode: "Accidental Negotiator"
2007	House	John	Episode: "Whatever It Takes"
2007	Nip/Tuck	Rob	Episode: "Chaz Darling"
2008	Eleventh Hour	Karl Altschuler	Episode: "Argo"
2008	The Mentalist	Mitchell Reese	Episode: "Flame Red"
2009	Saving Grace	Curtis Marks	Episode: "She's a Lump"
2010	24	Pavel Tokarev	4 episodes
2010	The Closer	Darren Tatem	Episode: "In Custody"
2012, 2013	NCIS: Los Angeles	Viktor Varlamov	2 episodes
2015	The Blacklist	Lyle Fisher	Episode: "The Troll Farmer (No. 38)"
