= Boulevard (1994 film) =

- Directed by: Penelope Buitenhuis
- Written by: Andrea Wilde
- Produced by: Ilana Frank; Peer J. Oppenheimer; Ray Sager; Peter R. Simpson
- Starring: Rae Dawn Chong; Kari Wuhrer; Lou Diamond Phillips; Lance Henriksen; Joel Bissonnette; Judith Scott
- Cinematography: David Frazee
- Edited by: Bernadette Kelly
- Music by: Ian Thomas
- Release date: 1994
- Running time: 95 minutes
- Country: Canada
- Language: English

Boulevard is a 1994 Canadian crime thriller film starring Rae Dawn Chong, Kari Wuhrer and Lou Diamond Phillips.

== Plot ==
A woman named Jennefer runs away from her abusive boyfriend, gives her baby up for adoption, and takes the next bus out of town. She ends up on the streets during a grim and cold winter in Toronto. She's taken in by a prostitute named Ola.

Ola happens to see the local pimp Hassan murder another prostitute, but refuses to testify against him, knowing that Hassan has associates that would kill her if she snitched. A police officer named McClaren attempts to interrogate her, and when she refuses to talk she is deported to the USA.

Ola eventually makes her way back to Toronto, and Jennefer greets her with relief. Feeling bad for not having found a job to help repay Ola's kindness, Jennefer asks for Ola’s help and becomes a prostitute with Ola taking her under her wing to learn the ropes. Jennefer is later confronted by her boyfriend, who has tracked her down with the intent of killing her for leaving him and putting their baby up for adoption behind his back. She eventually breaks free briefly and shoots him in self-defense, then abandoning his body in his car in a local alley.

Meanwhile, Ola, convinced that Hassan had taken Jennefer and was forcing her to work for him and harm her like the rest of his girls, takes her gun and goes over to Hassan's house and demands to know where Jennefer is. Hassan tells her he does not have her, and after a verbal altercation, Ola is beaten violently by Hassan and left to die on the riverbank. Jennefer returns to Ola's apartment looking for her after having killed her boyfriend, but Ola is not there and nobody else seems to know where she is until one of Hassan's girls, Sheila, admits that she saw everything and that Ola is in the hospital near death.

Jennefer rushes to Ola's side where she finds Ola seeming to be comatose. She vows revenge and takes her gun to confront Hassan for what he did to Ola. She shoots him several times and stops short of killing him and leaves the scene. Hassan is then arrested shortly after by McClaren. Jennefer returns to Ola's hospital bedside and tells her she got revenge and that Ola cannot die because she loves her. Suddenly Ola opens her eyes to look at Jennefer, seeming to be awake and Jennefer is hopeful. But then her heart monitor signals that her heartbeat flatlined and she dies. The movie ends with Jennefer packing up some keepsakes of Ola and getting on a bus for some unknown destination.

== Cast ==
- Rae Dawn Chong as Ola
- Kari Wuhrer as Jennefer
- Lou Diamond Phillips as Hassan
- Lance Henriksen as McClaren
- Joel Bissonnette as "J–Rod"
- Judith Scott as Sheila
- Amber Lea Weston as Debi
- Greg Campbell as "Coco"
- Keram Malicki–Sánchez as Sister
- Katie Griffin (credited as Katie Griffen) as Lorraine
- Marcia Bennett as Mrs. Braverly
- Michael Eric Kramer (credited as Michael Kramer) as Doctor
- Linlyn Lue as ICU Nurse
- James Loxley as Dr. Edwards
- Timm Zemanek as Ticket Clerk
- Renato Rizzuti as Large Man
- Jim Feather as Chester
- Jimmy Loftus as Paul
- Christopher Bickford as Punk
- Alex Bandiera as Thug
- Kathleen Kitts as Blonde Woman

== Reception ==
Allmovie critic Sandra Brennan gave the film 1 1/2 stars out of 5.
