= The Aquanettas =

American rock band

- The Aquanettas, 1990

Background information
- Origin: New York City, New York, USA
- Genres: Post-punk, rock, alternative rock
- Years active: 1987–1995
- Labels: IRS, Nettwerk, Giant/Rockville, Mayor Label, Prize Pagoda
- Spinoffs: Birdy
- Past members: Deborah Schwartz; Jill Richmond; Claudine Troise; Stephanie Seymour

The Aquanettas were an all-female band from New York City that one New York Times writer said played "classic, basic rock-and-roll: just rugged guitar riffs and lyrics about the more bothersome aspects of romance". Their music was influenced by classic rock such as Led Zeppelin and punk bands such as X, mixed with surf rock overtones. The band was formed in the late 1980s in New York City by vocalist Deborah Schwartz and guitarist Jill Richmond along with bassist Claudine Troise and drummer Stephanie Seymour. The Aquanettas toured nationally and secured a record deal with Canadian record label Nettwerk Productions who distributed their recordings through IRS Records in the United States. They released one album for IRS/Nettwerk, two independent EPs and three singles before breaking up in 1995.

== The Aquanettas (1987–1995) ==
Lead vocalist Deborah Schwartz had moved from Voorheesville to Manhattan in January 1986 after spending three months in Los Angeles, California where she met guitarist Jill Richmond. Schwartz began her career in New York with an experimental/performance art group called The Summit Ensemble. When Richmond joined her in New York one year later, they formed The Aquanettas along with bassist Claudine Troise and drummer Stephanie Seymour. It is reported that the band took their name from actress Burnu Acquanetta.

When the band played the New Music Seminar in NYC they signed a deal with Canadian record label Nettwerk Productions, who distributed their albums through IRS Records in the United States, and toured nationally, including as a support act for Nine Inch Nails. Called "a seminal all-female group from the early '90s" by some writers, singer Joan Osborne has covered their songs in concert and is a fan, so much so she would later make Schwartz her first signing on her Womanly Hips label. After being dissatisfied with the lack of promotion by IRS Records, they asked to be released and toured Europe on their own in support of their Indy releases. Richmond would later say she became fond of using a certain slang term to describe female genitalia while on tour in Great Britain. Their single, "Mind Full of Worry" is included on the soundtrack of Hal Hartley's 1994 film, Amateur, and in 1996 a remix of their song "Beach Party" was included on the soundtrack for the feature film Kissed, which was distributed by MGM in the United States.

== Discography ==
=== Albums ===
Date of release	Title	Label	Type
March 20, 1990	Love with the Proper Stranger	IRS	LP
1992	The Aquanettas	Plastic Records	EP
July 5, 1993	Roadhaus	Giant/Rockville	EP

=== Singles ===
1990	"Beach Party"	IRS	Single
1991	"Whoa!"	Mayor Label Records	3-song maxi-single
1992	"Super Absorbent"	Prize Pagoda	3-song maxi-single

=== Soundtracks ===
Year	Song	Movie / album	Record label	Release type
1994	"Mind Full of Worry"	Amateur	Matador Records	Soundtrack
1996	"Beach Party" (remix)	Kissed	Nettwerk Productions	Soundtrack

=== Compilations ===
1990	Nettwerk Sound Sampler, Vol. III	Nettwerk Productions	Compilation

== After the band ==
Troise played bass with instrumental band The Vice Royals featuring Pete "The Other White Meat" Linzell, Jay Sherman Godfrey's The Lazy Jaycees, and with Nancy Sexton and the Sugar Monkeys.

Richmond played with Mean Reds, with Vinny DeNunzio on drums, Kris Yiengst on bass, and Elizabeth Presley on vocals. The Mike Hunt Band (a Rolling Stones tribute band) was next, and is still active. Richmond is Keith Richards and Tammy Faye Starlight is Mick Jager. Starlight and Richmond are currently forming an original band called Little T & J.

Schwartz was signed to Womanly Hips, Joan Osborne's Label and recorded "Wrongs of Passage", her 1998 major-label release. Currently, she sings and plays bass with P.G. Six band and sang on their 2006 Drag City release "Slightly Sorry". Schwartz has been a singer with Loser's Lounge since 1993. She is currently recording an album in NYC.

Seymour joined Adam Roth's Psychic Penguin, a pop powerhouse band that featured strong melodies and four-part harmonies. The members of Penguin liked to trade off instruments on stage, and Seymour sang, played drums on a few songs, and played percussion in the band. After Penguin, she formed her own band and became lead singer and songwriter for Birdy. The band released two CDs ("Supernominal Paraphernalia" and "Quarantine") on the independent, collective, cooperative label Cropduster Records. She currently sings in The New Ugly, formed with her husband and former Winter Hours guitar player Bob Perry, and she occasionally sings in Loser's Lounge in NYC.
