= Suspicious River =

- Theatrical poster
- Directed by: Lynne Stopkewich
- Written by: Laura Kasischke; Lynne Stopkewich
- Produced by: Hamish McAlpine; Erik Stensrud
- Starring: Molly Parker; Callum Keith Rennie; Mary Kate Welsh; Joel Bissonnette; Deanna Milligan; Sarah-Jane Redmond; Byron Lucas; Don S. Davis
- Cinematography: Gregory Middleton
- Edited by: Allan Lee
- Music by: Don MacDonald
- Release date: September 5, 2000 (Venice Film Festival)
- Running time: 92 minutes
- Country: Canada
- Language: English

Suspicious River is a 2000 Canadian drama film directed by Lynne Stopkewich, based on a novel by Laura Kasischke, and starring Molly Parker and Callum Keith Rennie. Its plot follows a young woman in 1981 who begins prostituting herself and consequently finds herself in a precarious situation after beginning a sexual relationship with one of her customers.

== Plot ==
In 1981 Leila Murray works as a receptionist in a motel. She begins to offer sexual services to customers in exchange for money. As she explores her sexuality, she discovers within herself an attraction towards semi-rough sex. One of her customers, Gary Jensen, beats her during their first encounter. When he returns to apologize, she accepts and begins to see him again. When one of Leila's other customers gets too rough, Leila flees to Gary's room to seek his consolation and protection. His gentle treatment of her encourages her growing trust in him.

Leila's only confidant, outside of Gary, is a little girl that plays around the inn. The girl lives in an unhappy home, where her parents fight constantly. One day, the girl's Uncle Andy takes the child and her mother Bonnie on a roadtrip. In the midst of this trip, the little girl discovers that her mother and her Uncle Andy are having an affair.

Meanwhile, Leila has grown very close to Gary, who begins to represent an escape from her passionless marriage and dead-end job. She stops charging him for sex. Despite momentary misgivings about his intentions, his passion convinces her to turn away from her life. She steals the money from the inn, and gives it to Gary, along with her savings acquired through her sexual services of the inn's clients. Together, they drive away in his car to his cabin in the woods. Once there, she is informed by one of Gary's friends that he is a pimp, and that his intention is to sell her services to his friends. Trapped, with no money or means of transportation, she is raped and beaten by a group of men invited by Gary. In the midst of her trauma, her mind turns back to the day in her childhood when her Uncle Andy had taken Leila's mother Bonnie out on a roadtrip and killed Bonnie in a fit of jealousy, right in front of the child Leila. It is thus revealed that Leila 'is' the little girl to whom she had been talking throughout the film. The little girl's broken home life holds the key to Leila's grown-up sexuality.

After Leila is raped, one of the men takes pity on her and helps her to escape Gary's cabin. Gary and the men form a search party and comb the woods to find her. The little girl, Leila's child self, appears to Leila to inform her that Gary intends to kill her and that she must fight for her survival. When Gary finds Leila, he is distracted by the distant screaming of the little girl that he can't see, and Leila takes the opportunity to run off and flee to safety in the arms of her friend and co-worker Millie, who had been searching the woods for her, as well. Thus Leila turns her back on Gary and acknowledges the previously-suppressed memories of her past.

== Cast ==
- Molly Parker as Leila Murray
- Callum Keith Rennie as Gary Jensen
- Joel Bissonnette as Rick Schmidt
- Byron Lucas as Uncle Andy
- Norman Armour as Jack Murray
- Sarah-Jane Redmond as Bonnie Murray
- Deanna Milligan as Millie

== Awards and nominations ==
Leo Award Nominations:

- Best Director of Feature Length Drama (Lynne Stopkewich)
- Best Musical Score of Feature Length Drama (Don MacDonald)
- Best Overall Sound of Best Feature Length Drama
- Best Performance of Feature Length Drama - Female (Molly Parker)
- Best Picture Editing of Feature Length Drama (Allan Lee)
- Best Screenwriter of Feature Length Drama (Lynne Stopkewich)

Leo Award Wins:

- Best Cinematography of Feature Length Drama (Gregory Middleton)
- Best Feature Length Drama
- Best Performance of Feature Length Drama - Male (Callum Keith Rennie)
