= Kissed =

1996 Canadian romantic erotic drama film by Lynn Stopkewich

- Theatrical release poster
- Directed by: Lynne Stopkewich
- Written by: Angus Fraser; Lynne Stopkewich
- Based on: "We So Seldom Look on Love" by Barbara Gowdy
- Produced by: Dean English; Lynne Stopkewich
- Starring: Molly Parker; Peter Outerbridge; Jay Brazeau; Natasha Morley
- Cinematography: Gregory Middleton
- Edited by: John Pozer; Peter Roeck; Lynne Stopkewich
- Music by: Don MacDonald
- Production company: Boneyard Film
- Distributed by: Malofilm
- Release dates: September 7, 1996 (TIFF); April 11, 1997 (wide release)
- Running time: 78 minutes
- Country: Canada
- Language: English
- Budget: US$175,000–750,000 (Note: There are divergent information for the film's budget by different sources. During a 2003 British Columbia Supreme Court's case in which John Pozer sued Lynne Stopkewich over the film's rights, he affirmed the invested $20,000 of its $175,000 production budget. Scholar Lee Parpart said it was done under a budget of precisely $473,850, while coproducer Dean English declared the final budget was not yet determined by 1997 but that is should come around $750,000. Playback and Maclean's reported it costed under $1 million. Some sources provide detailed numbers for some investors, but not all. For example, Parpart mentioned the University of British Columbia contributed a grant of $3,400; the Canada Council Media Arts provided a grant of $47,000; British Columbia Film contributed $162,000; and Telefilm contributed $25,000. A Playback story affirmed Stopkewich, English and Pozer, through her own money, family and friends, raise about $100,000; the Canada Council provided $47,500, Telefilm offered $25,000, while British Columbia Film paid about $45,000. The Globe and Mail said its shooting costed $60,000 and that Stopkewich raised alone $80,000, while scholar Kalli Paakspuu commented she invested $36,000 herself and that her company was $400,00 in deferals and investment recoupment before the film's release.)
- Box office: US$330–465,000

Kissed is a 1996 Canadian romantic/erotic drama film (Note: The film has been usually described as a drama, a romance, a dark romance, or an erotic story with black humor elements. Judy Gerstel of The Toronto Star, however, said it "fits no known genre", describing it as "something like a romantic comedy with a stake through its heart".) directed and co-written by Lynne Stopkewich, based on Barbara Gowdy's short story "We So Seldom Look on Love". It premiered at the Toronto International Film Festival on September 7, 1996.

The film stars Molly Parker as Sandra Larson, a young woman whose fixation on death leads her to study embalming at a mortuary school, where in turn she finds herself drawn toward feelings of necrophilia. Peter Outerbridge also stars as Matt, a fellow student who develops romantic feelings for Sandra, and so must learn to accept her sexual proclivities.

== Plot ==
As far back as Sandra Larson can remember, she has been fascinated by death. As a child, she dances with the corpses of animals at night, rubbing them on her body, before giving them a funeral. She performs this dance in front of her only friend, a girl named Carol, who ends their friendship soon afterward.

In college, Sandra studies biology, carefully dissecting the bodies of small animals, trying to avoid disfiguring them. She gets a job at a funeral home to be closer to dead bodies. The funeral home's janitor Jan believes, like Sandra, that dead bodies still have a soul in them. While driving the hearse with a body in a coffin in the back through a car wash, Sandra looks at the body and finds a shining light, believing that body's soul is alive somewhere.

Mr. Wallis apprentices Sandra in embalming. She starts studying mortuary science, where she meets a medical student named Matt who also must study corpses for his major. Matt and Sandra begin to date, and Matt is intrigued by Sandra's death fascination. Occasionally, they spend nights together in Matt's basement apartment, but Sandra always leaves for late night visits to the mortuary to celebrate the dead bodies of young men with dance ceremonies which escalate into necrophilia.

Matt becomes increasingly jealous of the deeper connection Sandra seems to feel with her dead bodies. He pesters her at the funeral home and begs her to role-play necrophilia with him as the dead body, but she finds his behavior off-putting. Finally he hangs himself, so that he can make the ultimate sexual connection with Sandra in death that he could not in life. In a closing narration, Sandra explains that she still "crosses over" (as she euphemistically calls her necrophilia) but now thinks of Matt whenever she does.

== Cast ==
- Molly Parker as Sandra Larson
  - Natasha Morley as young Sandra
- Peter Outerbridge as Matt
- Jay Brazeau as Mr. Wallis, Mortician
- Jessie Winter Mudie as Carol, young Sandra's best friend
- James Timmons as Jan, Mortuary Janitor
- Joe Maffei as Biology Teacher
- Robert Thurston as Detective
- Annabel Kershaw as Mother Larson
- Tim Dixon as Father Larson, owner of Larson's Flowers

== Production ==
=== Concept ===
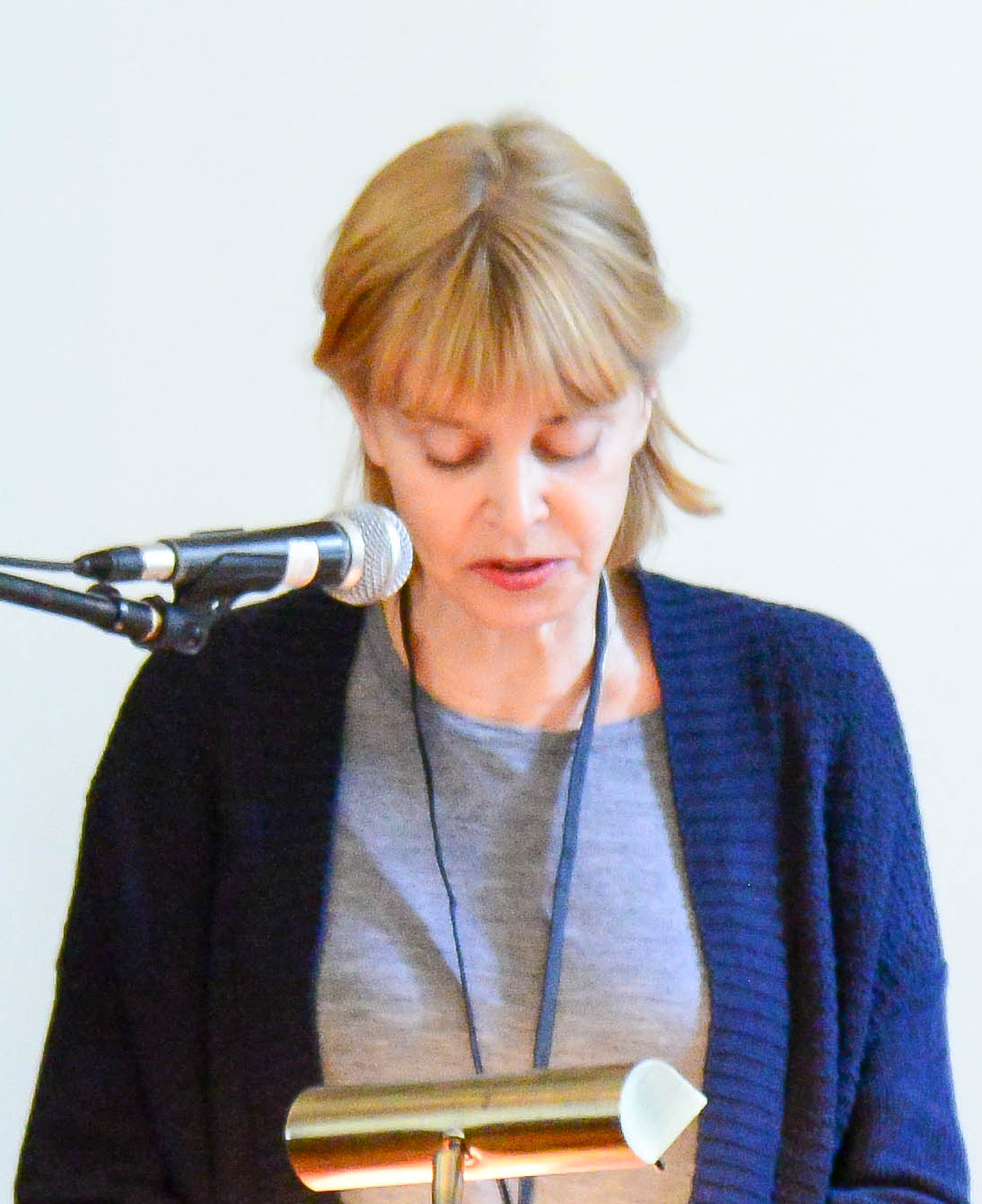
"We So Seldom Look on Love", a 1992 short story about a necrophile written by Barbara Gowdy (pictured) was Lynne Stopkewich's main inspiration for Kissed

Originally, director Lynne Stopkewich had no particular interest in death or necrophilia. However, an interview of Karen Greenlee, a young California woman caught in a necrophile act with a male cadaver in the late 1970s, got her attention. Another inspiration was reading "We So Seldom Look on Love", a 1992 short story written by Barbara Gowdy, in The Girl Wants to, a collection of female erotica edited by Lynn Crosbie, while working on another film script in February 1994. The short story, itself inspired by the Greenlee case, impacted Stopkewich because of its originality and non-judgmental tone, and it impressed her so much that it began to negatively affect her writing process.

She then contacted Gowdy, acquiring the option to the story for an undisclosed sum in May 1994. Stopkewich described her version as "an interpretation of the piece, not so much a literal translation", and stated that she did not include some details because of the film's low budget. Mainly, she omitted details about the main character's family and instead focused on her experiences as a child and young adult. Stopkewich stated "We So Seldom Look on Love" was an ideal story for a low-budget adaptation because it only featured two main characters and had few locations. The desired 1970s-like setting also helped in decreasing production costs due to thrift shops and garage sale scenarios being cheaper than a "contemporary look".

We were literally choosing or rejecting shots based on whether Molly [Parker] looked good in them, whether she looked soft or empathetic, or whether she came off looking harsh, or if her delivery of a line was at all edgy ... it all had to go in that direction. That was the task of the movie: getting the audience on side with a necrophile.

— Lynne Stopkewich

Generally, necrophiles most commonly present as single persons with an above-average IQ, a propensity for atypical belief systems, and who generally work in death-associated occupations. This is the inspiration behind the main character of the film, Sandra. Stopkewich expressed that she had never actually met a necrophile, nor did she research the topic extensively. She only visited one funeral home before the shoot, declaring it was not her aim to make Sandra "a spokesmodel for all necrophiles". Instead, she set out to create what she called an "unforgettable character," attempting to "put aside my own critical and moral judgments and allow myself to truly enter into the world of the characters".

Her goal was to explore Sandra's "interior world" by focusing on the life experiences she had in common with the character—like growing up in the suburbs, burying dead animals, keeping secret objects hidden under the bed, disco dancing, facing one's mother after the first menstruation, dealing with questions of sex and death, one's first date, and one's first sexual experience. By introducing her through flashbacks as a young girl, Stopkewich desired to create sympathy for the character in order to make her socially inappropriate, taboo passions more acceptable by the audience. Ultimately, Stopkewich described the film's focus as "really kind of a sweet emotional journey with this coming-of-age of this young woman".

=== Development ===
Stopkewich started Kissed while studying film at University of British Columbia (UBC); the first draft was written by her in July 1994, and it was shown as her thesis project under the title Wide Awake: That Necrophile Movie to obtain a Master of Fine Arts degree, an honor which she acquired in 1996. As such, the film was self-funded, Stopkewich mostly used UBC's equipments and several crew members were film students. Other crew included newcomer filmmakers such as Bruce Sweeney (whose debut Live Bait was in 1995) as boom operator, Gregory Wild (Highway of Heartache, 1994) contributing to the art direction, and her companion John Pozer as Foley artist. Stopkewich gathered some money and experience with low-budget films from working as the production designer of Pozer's two first films The Grocer's Wife (1991) and The Michelle Apartments (1995). Canadian actor's trade union ACTRA provided a 50 percent deferral of scale as part of an agreement with UBC. After receiving a $3,400 grant from UBC Film Department, Stopkewich invested $36,000 of her own money for a total of $80,000–100,000 raised with the help of co-producer Dean English, Pozer, family and friends. The main production company for Kissed, Boneyard Film—a Vancouver-based enterprise incorporated with Stopkewich, Pozer, and English—went $400,000 into debt during the film's production, while Stopkewich herself had a $30,000 debt in 1996.

Because of an eight-week opportunity to use equipment at discount, Stopkewich wrote the first draft in only a week to then start its filming. After Stopkewich and Angus Frazer rewrote the screenplay in August 1994, principal photography took five weeks between September and October. To reduce costs during the filming, Stopkewich had the idea of using the company's production office as a film set; after painting and decoration, it became both the funeral home interiors and Matt's basement apartment. The initial sum of money allowed the film to be shot, but was not enough to develop the film stock, so the Kissed had to be concluded in December when the National Film Board of Canada offered its facilities to process and print the rushes. Because of that, during the first week of shooting, only select rushes were processed to ensure the filming was good. In 1995, after editing was finished on a Steenbeck machine in Pozer's mother basement, the production team applied for a Canada Council Media Arts grant, which resulted in a $47,000–47,500 sum. Sound recording was done between November 1995 and March 1996. The use of Nettwerk Records' music library and Western Post Productions' digital sound editing were done at deferred cost. Finally, Stopkewich obtained $25,000 from Telefilm Canada for completion money and $45,000–162,000 from British Columbia Film to adapt it to 35mm format at DuArt Film and Video by April 1996.

=== Casting and characters ===
For the main role, Stopkewich originally desired to cast a blonde woman, since the original story described her as "a Doris Day type of character". She was having difficulty to find such an actress and was "desperately looking for someone to play that part" since the film was already in pre-production. By chance, main actress Molly Parker was a friend of the film's cinematographer Gregory Middleton and wanted to meet Stopkewich because she had never seen a woman director. After reading the script, Parker was interested in the role and performed it to Stopkewich, who was impressed and cast her. By August 1994, all other main roles—Peter Outerbridge and Jay Brazeau—were cast. For Outerbridge's part as Matt, Stopkewich appreciated Fraser's help since the story was written and directed from a woman's point of view. Matt's character became a counterbalance in a female-centric world and Fraser's constant revisions were essential to create a "full-dimensional Matt". She dubbed him the devil's advocate, "especially in regard to the male characters".

== Themes and analysis ==
=== Sexuality and gender ===
Although Offscreen's Donato Totaro said that a metaphorical interpretation of the film as female empowerment would be "an act of interpretative magicry", scholars usually interpreted it as possessing "emancipatory narratives and allegories of women's empowerment" or at least "feminist ambiguities" that depicts "extreme female sexual transgression". A Maclean's article described it as having "feminist intelligence". Stopkewich herself talked about not transforming the main character into an object; she instead wanted her to be the subject of the scenes she was in. She declared, "it was crucial to empower Sandra's sexuality when we finally see her engaged in necrophilia". As such, she made cinematic choices that fit it; for example, she tried to create intimacy during the sex scenes so the audience would not feel like they are stalking her. Instead, the protagonist looks directly to the camera when she has an orgasm in a confrontational way. Stopkewich chose to have a white light in this moment to make it possible for people to see how others are reacting and discourage people from walking out in the middle of the film. (Note: About this topic, Stopkewich said: "I liked the idea of the white light, because I thought, 'If I have it at really critical moments where people might be walking out, then the theatre will be filled with bright light and you'll be able to see who's leaving—so they'll feel really embarrassed! It's like 'You can run but you can't hide!'".) The director also said she was confronted by people angry "with the fact we've created this character who is totally inaccessible from a male, heterosexual standpoint", and commented Sandra's sexual acts were not phallocentric. Paakspuu, in the chapter "Lynne Stopkewich: Abject Sexualities" of Great Canadian Film Directors, described Sandra as an "id-driven, free spirit, in touch with her feelings and emotions—a loner with the sensitivity of a poet", and said that her quest for forbidden knowledge and deviant sexuality made her "a woman to fear".

Lee Parpart, writing in The Gendered Screen: Canadian Women Filmmakers, commented that Kissed features "contradictory impulses" in the simultaneous wish to have the audience sympathy and to keep them out of their comfort zone that make difficult to say if it is or not a feminist film. On one hand, Stopkewich called Kissed "the Disney version of a film about necrophilia", which Parpart agreed when she analyzed the different portrayal Sandra had in Gowdy's short story. Parpart said Stopkewich "de-radicalize" core aspects of the original story by removing its emphasis on middle-aged femininity, adding a spiritual tone that makes her sound inoffensive, making changes in her voice tone, and changing its ending to one that aligns Sandra with the domestic values of loyalty and monogamy. (Note: Parpart further said Stopkewich's Sandra never utters "necrophile" and "cunnilingus", both used in the short story. Also, Gowdy's story concludes with Sandra saying, "I am still a necrophile, occasionally and recklessly. I have found no replacement for the torrid serenity of a cadaver", while the film ends with the line "I still work at a funeral home, and I still cross over. But now I see Matt when I look at the centre". According to Parpart, this ending diminishes Sandra's sexual extremism by "aligning her with the domestic values of loyalty and monogamy" because it portrays Sandra as Matt's soulmate even after his death, and as a kind of "necrophiliac widow who will forever be haunted by the memory of her favourite corpse".) She also stated that the fact that the characters's deviant sexuality is contained within a heteronormative context helped its normalization. (Note: Parpart noted Sandra is portrayed as "unambiguously heterosexual" both in the short story and in the film. Although Matt suggests that Sandra might be lesbian, Sandra, surprised, dismisses it in the film, and "her blinking, startled expression at the thought of sleeping with a dead woman rather than a dead man arguably helps to further normalize Sandra's otherwise hugely unorthodox sexual aims".) On the other hand, Parpart observed the film had a modernist desire to provide audience with intellectual discomfort as evidenced by Stopkewich's use of white light to constrain walking out people. She further declared it fit third-wave feminism's trend for female icons who balance empowerment with sexual availability and allure, and functioned as part of the debates within 1980s feminism in North America, including feminist reconsiderations of the role of pornography and its censorship.

Paakspuu analyzed that Sandra's obsession with death is associated with her first menstruation—an addition done by Stopkewich that fills in details that have only been implied in Gowdy's story. One of the first moments Sandra realizes her passion is when she is playing with dead animals along her friend Carol. At one point, Sandra is reprehended by Carol when she thinks Sandra had rubbed herself with animal blood when it is actually menstrual blood. According to Paakspuu, Carol's reaction could be interpreted as demonstrating a moral belief system that opposes a "good" blood (menstrual/life giving) to a "bad" one (from death/injury). By doing that, Stopkewich subverts what would be common and naturalizes the deviance.

=== Light use and spirituality ===
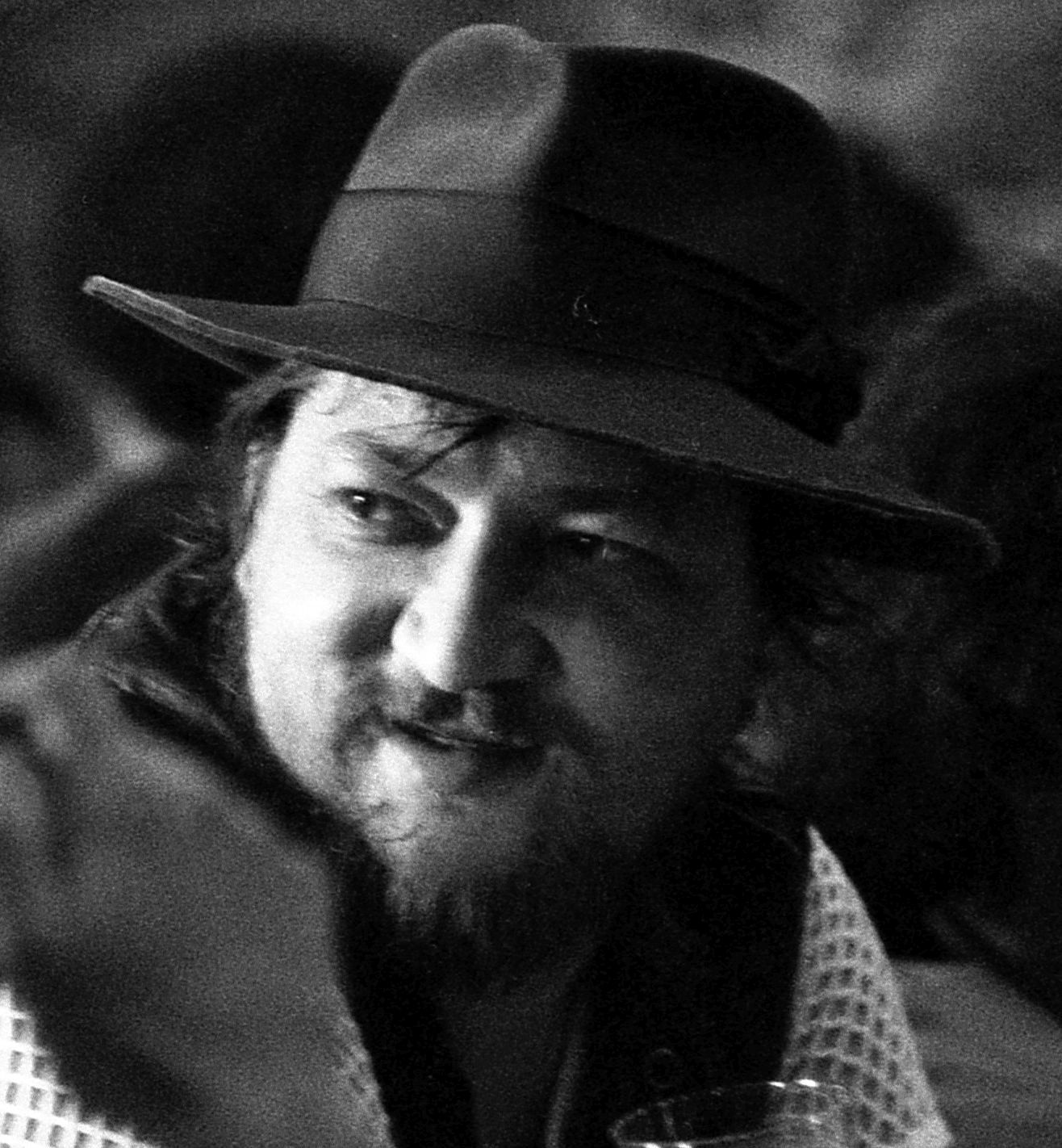
The 1974 film Effi Briest, directed by Rainer Werner Fassbinder (pictured), was an influence on Stopkewich's symbolic use of white light in Kissed

The display of light and darkness in Kissed was meant to be symbolic by Stopkewich, who was influenced by Gowdy's description of Sandra's sexual acts as "being like being burned by a white light". Since necrophilia is usually seen as a morbid subject, Stopkewich tried to subvert this perception by making Sandra "a child of light (and by association) of goodness". The director said: "We used burns to white whenever Sandra touches death to play against the idea of a cold so deep it is seen as a white light". The whiteness was also influenced by and a homage to German Rainer Werner Fassbinder's 1974 film Effi Briest, in which blinding fades to white denote the protagonist's desire to be free from the constraints of social status. Sandra's necrophile acts are the moments in which fog filters are used to create a "spirit-filled glow or 'aura' around the characters" that "intensify the lyrical, dream-like quality of 'crossing over'", as described by Paakspuu. Lee Parpart argued that the use of fog filters, halo effects, beloweye-line shots, and the white light made Kissed into a film that "sells its blood-loving lead character as a sensitive figure whose stated motivation for sleeping with dead bodies ... becomes all the more believable and acceptable because she is lit and shot in a way that lends her a kind of otherworldly beauty and innocence".

Paakspuu noted Stopkewich created a moral dichotomy through her symbolic use of lights, colour palette, scenarios, and sounds in the film. Sandra, presented as "a light-drenched angel" in Paakspuu's words, is shown in sparsely decorated grey-blue that mirrors the clarity of corpses. She becomes illuminated by red when she is courted by Matt, "embodying the uncontained sensuality and sexuality of a noir vamp". Matt is also thematically connected to darkness because of his basement apartment and attitudes like sitting in the dark and jumping out of the darkness at Sandra leaving the funeral home. Stopkweich said, "Darkness too plays a part if only to differentiate from the 'light' of Sandra's experience". Paakspuu wrote that Matt's darkness is shown by his interest in alternative realities and his lack of own motives that makes him try to fill that gap by making Sandra's interest his own. While she is associated with nature, shyness, and virginity because of her pagan and ritualistic's world, Matt's one is linked to science and technology and is claustrophobic and distracting. As such, their soundscapes reflect a nature–culture divide, in which Matt's surrounding sounds like traffic, household appliances and airplanes stand for the culture, while Sandra's classical elements and animals' sound effects stand for nature.

Many film critics considered that necrophilia was not the subject per se of the film. Roger Ebert said it "is about a necrophiliac, but in its approach, it could be about spirituality or transcendence." Totaro stated the film "[was] not about necrophilia at all", but a New Agey exploration of the mind–body problem. Totaro wrote it felt closer to "afterlife" or "out-of-body" experience films such as Ghost than Dellamorte Dellamore or the Nekromantik films and that the white light was used to make the audience understand that it was a spiritual experience. Parpart declared Sandra "seek[s] out a kind of sexual-spiritual union with the cadavers". Peter Bowen of Filmmaker commented that the film's opening voice-over "invit[ed] us to eroticize death in transcendent and spiritual ways" and that the light/darkness palette "symbolize[s] the story's libidinal and spiritual forces". Similarly, Paakspuu said the voice-over was used to poeticize the narrative and express Sandra's spirituality and worldview. Specific camera movement—swooping, spinning, and soaring—was also singled by Paakspuu because she considered it helped to contrast her necrophile acts as moments of "heightened sense of euphoria" in opposition to daily activities.

== Release and reception ==
Kissed debuted at the Toronto International Film Festival on September 7, 1996. Although it has been described as "one of the most controversial films" at the festival by Ebert, it was acquired by commercial distributors in only a few days. (Note: The Globe and Mail reported it was acquired by U.S., Canadian and international distributors in one day, while The Vancouver Sun said it gained a commercial distributor within five days.) According to The Canadian Encyclopedia, the film "caused a sensation" at film festivals, while Playback reported it "caused a stir and a bidding war" at Toronto and that on October 4, 1996, at least 300 people could not see Kissed's showing in the Vancouver International Film Festival because it was crowded. Its exhibition at the 1997 Cannes Film Festival received a warm reception and was the first sell-out of the Directors' Fortnight.

The film opened in Canada on nine screens on April 11, 1997, where it was distributed by Malofilm. Although the company did not disclose box office numbers, Playback reports it grossed $256,000 at the Canadian box office. Cinépix Film Properties considered acquiring its American distribution rights, but ultimately it was done by Goldwyn Entertainment Company. In its opening three-day weekend on April 18, Kissed grossed $37,100 on eight screens. After 141 weeks in theaters in the United States, it grossed $329,211, according to Box Office Mojo, while The Numbers informs a total gross of $465,417. The film was also marketed in Europe and, according to the European Audiovisual Observatory, the film was seen by 77,887 people in the continent. The highest attendance occurred in Italy (over 19,000), the United Kingdom (18,000), and Germany (11,000). The film was described as "an art-house hit" and as an "indie hit" by The Province and The Globe and Mail, respectively.

The film received some acclaim from film critics at the time of its release. The review aggregator website Rotten Tomatoes reports an 68% approval rating based on 22 reviews, with an average rating of 6.7/10. Mostly positive commentary was directed towards Stopkewich's capacity of handling such a subject in a subtle and sensitive way and to Parker's performance. Maclean's reported that, despite its taboo-subject, "what shocked many of those who actually saw Kissed was that it was so sensitive, so poetic and so strangely inoffensive". It has been described as bold debut film; Maclean's called it "arguably the most provocative debut in the annals of Canadian cinema" and included both Stopkewich and Parker in a 1997's list of "100 Canadians to Watch". On the April 12, 1997 episode of Siskel and Ebert, it received two thumbs up from Gene Siskel and Roger Ebert.

The New York Times noted that "it would be easy to snicker at this Canadian film, were its subject not handled with a delicacy and lyricism that underscore the mystical rather than gruesome aspects of what Sandra cooly acknowledges is a consuming addiction". The A.V. Club stated that "There's much of interest here, and though it's rare and refreshing to find a film that genuinely tries to address the subject of death directly, Kissed is likely to leave its audience as cold as the objects of its heroine's desire".

=== Impact ===
"The Kissed hype", as described Playback, resulted in a month-long tour by Stopkewich in the United States, where she and Parker signed to the William Morris Agency. Between the aftermath of its wide release and the end of 1997, Stopkewich was receiving a lot of potential scripts from Hollywood and elsewhere.

The film was Parker's breakthrough role; Until acting as Sandra in Kissed, Parker had only been featured in relatively unknown Canadian television productions; After receiving critical acclaim, she appeared in Variety's cover, and attracted the attention of several directors and producers, including British Michael Winterbottom (Wonderland, 1999), Hungarian István Szabó (Sunshine, 1999), and American Jodie Foster (Waking the Dead, 2000).

Along with Atom Egoyan's 1994 Exotica and David Cronenberg's 1996 Crash, Kissed helped the Canadian film industry gain international notoriety. The Canadian Encyclopedia's article "Canadian Film History: Notable Films and Filmmakers 1980 to Present" highlighted it, calling it "a highly successful" piece.

A new 4K restoration of the film is slated to screen in the TIFF Classics program at the 2026 Toronto International Film Festival.

=== Awards ===
Awards
Ceremony	Category	Name	Outcome
18th Genie Awards	Best Motion Picture	Dean English, Lynne Stopkewich	Nominated
18th Genie Awards	Performance by an Actor in a Leading Role	Peter Outerbridge	Nominated
18th Genie Awards	Performance by an Actress in a Leading Role	Molly Parker	Won
18th Genie Awards	Achievement in Direction	Lynne Stopkewich	Nominated
18th Genie Awards	Original Screenplay	Angus Fraser, Lynne Stopkewich	Nominated
18th Genie Awards	Achievement in Cinematography	Gregory Middleton	Nominated
18th Genie Awards	Achievement in Music/Original Score	Don MacDonald	Nominated
18th Genie Awards	Achievement in Music/Original Song	Kristy Thirsk, "Bounds of Love"	Nominated

== Soundtrack ==
The original soundtrack album for Kissed was released by Nettwerk Records under the Unforscene Music imprint in 1997 and featured music appearing in and recorded for the film.

1. Don Macdonald – Bird in Hand (Original Score)
2. Ginger – Far Out
3. Don Macdonald – Ambulance (Original Score)
4. The Ids – Locked in a Room
5. Suzanne Little – This Time
6. Don Macdonald – Opening in Darkness (Original Score)
7. Tom Hooper – Come to Me
8. Don Macdonald – Vanity Mirror (Original Score)
9. Tara MacLean – That's Me
10. Delerium – Flowers Become Screens
11. Don Macdonald – Graveyard (Original Score)
12. Mark Findler – Train of Misery
13. Don Macdonald – Prep Room (Original Score)
14. The Aquanettas – Beach Party (remix)
15. Don Macdonald – Dead Matt (Original Score)
16. Kristy Thirsk – Bounds of Love
17. Don Macdonald – Love (Original Score)
18. Sarah McLachlan – Fumbling Towards Ecstasy
