= Who Loves the Sun (2006 film) =

- Directed by: Matt Bissonnette
- Written by: Matt Bissonnette
- Produced by: Corey Marr; Brendon Sawatzky
- Starring: Lukas Haas; Molly Parker; Adam Scott; R.H. Thomson; Wendy Crewson
- Cinematography: Arthur E. Cooper
- Edited by: Michele Conroy
- Music by: Mac McCaughan; Portastatic
- Distributed by: Christal Films Axiom Films (UK and Ireland)
- Release date: June 6, 2006
- Running time: 94 minutes
- Country: Canada
- Language: English

Who Loves the Sun is a 2006 Canadian film directed and written by Matt Bissonnette and starring Lukas Haas, Molly Parker, Adam Scott, R.H. Thomson, and Wendy Crewson.

== Plot ==
Will Morrison (Lukas Haas) and Daniel Bloom (Adam Scott) were best friends. Daniel was Will's best man at his wedding to Maggie Claire (Molly Parker). Then one day Will disappeared without a word. Five years later, he resurfaces. When Will and Daniel meet again, they go together to the docks to pick up Maggie, who slaps Will the minute she sees him.

Apparently, five years ago, Will walked in on Daniel and Maggie having sex, which Maggie said later was a one time thing. His sudden disappearance without any explanation upset her and now she demands an explanation. Will finally apologizes for that.

Daniel kisses Maggie and hopes to rekindle things with her. He had kept writing her throughout the many years of Will's absence with no response. Maggie refuses him, tells him it had been a great mistake. He spends the rest of the night drinking, having a conversation with his mom before she goes to bed. Very early the next morning, Daniel and his dad go fishing, where his dad inadvertently tells him that his mom's affair produced him. After Daniel confronts his mom, she tells him that it was with Will's dad, also finally explaining why Will's dad disappeared. Overwhelmed, with both having a different father and Will as his half-brother, he disappears.

All four spend time looking for Daniel, eventually deciding to wait for him to show himself. Maggie and Will finally have some time alone, say they love one another, spend the night together and she sneaks off and away early the next morning. Daniel catches her as she's leaving, and she asks him to give Will an explanation. He, very generously, encourages him to reconnect with her and try to start over. The final scene is of the two boys having breakfast with Daniel's parents, as a family.

== Cast ==
- Lukas Haas as Will Morrison
- Molly Parker as Maggie Claire
- Adam Scott as Daniel Bloom
- Wendy Crewson as Mary Bloom
- R.H. Thomson as Arthur Bloom

== Production ==
The film was shot in Kenora and Minaki, Ontario and Falcon Lake, Manitoba.

== Awards ==
- 2006 AFI Fest - Grand Jury Prize - Nominated - Matt Bissonnette
- 2007 WorldFest Houston - Bronze Award for Best Film - Won
- 2007 Beverly Hills Film Festival for Best Female Performance - Molly Parker - Won
- 2007 Genie Award for Best Performance by an Actress in a Leading Role - Nominated - Molly Parker
- 2008 Mississauga Independent Film Festival - Best Feature Film - Won
- 2011 Film North – Huntsville International Film Festival - Film North Best Feature Award - Won
