= Love with the Proper Stranger (album) =

Studio album by the Aquanettas
- Released: 1990
- Genre: Rock
- Label: Nettwerk/I.R.S.
- Producer: Mike Landolt

The Aquanettas chronology
Love with the Proper Stranger (1990)	Roadhaüs (1993)

Love with the Proper Stranger is the debut album by the American band the Aquanettas, released in 1990. A video was produced for the album's lead single, "Diplomat". The band supported the album with a North American tour.

== Production ==
All four band members contributed to the songwriting; they also worked with outside writers. Their chief influences were the Rolling Stones and the Velvet Underground. Nettwerk Records intentionally distorted the band photo on the album's cover, so that the group would not be perceived as merely a "girl group". "Pictures of Italy" is an ode to pasta.

== Critical reception ==
Professional ratings
Review scores
Source	Rating
AllMusic	2/5 stars
The Ithaca Journal	3.5/5 stars
Lincoln Journal Star	B+
Los Angeles Daily News	4/4 stars
St. Petersburg Times	3/4 stars

Trouser Press wrote: "Without pushing it as a gimmicky signature, singer/guitarist Deborah Schwartz’s mighty voice is redolent of West Coast ’60s folkrockers like the Mamas and the Papas (and, therefore, the early Bangles as well); drummer Stephanie Seymour’s high harmonies enhance and elevate the effect, as do the acoustic strummings and Jill Richmond’s tradition-packed lead guitar interjections." The Washington Post thought that the Aquanettas "aren't significantly retooling garage-rock, but they are keeping the engine warm," writing that the "melodic and vigorous ... tunes are vaguely Go-Go-ish, but more rakish." The New York Times deemed the music "classic, basic rock-and-roll: just rugged guitar riffs and lyrics about the more bothersome aspects of romance."

The Los Angeles Daily News called the album "a celebration of acid- etched melody, reverberant guitars and monotone vocals," writing that the music "suggests the Bangles on hallucinogens." USA Today lamented that the Aquanettas "weren't produced very well." The New Haven Register deemed Love with the Proper Stranger "one of 1990's overlooked gems."

== Track listing ==
No.	Title	Length
1.	"Diplomat"	3:00
2.	"Faults"	4:39
3.	"Beach Party"	5:12
4.	"Up!"	3:34
5.	"Connecting Line"	3:20
6.	"Footsteps"	3:46
7.	"Love with the Proper Stranger"	3:44
8.	"15 Men"	3:37
9.	"Lose My Mind"	4:17
10.	"Pictures of Italy"	3:00
11.	"That Ain't Right"	3:48
12.	"Black on Blonde"	3:44

== Personnel ==
- Jill Richmond – guitar
- Deborah Schwartz – guitar, vocals
- Stephanie Seymour – drums
- Claudine Troise – bass
