= Matt Bissonnette (director) =

Canadian film director, writer (active 2002– )

Benedict Matthew Bissonnette, usually credited as Matt Bissonnette, is a Canadian film director and writer.

Bissonnette and his childhood friend Steven Clark collaborated as codirectors and cowriters of the 2002 film Looking for Leonard. On his own, Bissonnette followed up with the films Who Loves the Sun in 2006, Passenger Side in 2009, and Death of a Ladies' Man in 2020.

Bissonnette's films frequently use the literary or musical work of Leonard Cohen as a thematic motif; Looking for Leonard centred in part on a character's fantasies of escaping her life to run away with Cohen after reading his novel Beautiful Losers, while both Passenger Side and Death of a Ladies' Man use Cohen's music in their soundtracks. His film Death of a Ladies' Man shares the title of Cohen's 1977 album of the same name.

He also works in advertising as a commercial director, and published the novel Smash Your Head on the Punk Rock in 2008.

He is the brother of actor Joel Bissonnette, and was married to actress Molly Parker from 2002 to 2016.
