= Adam Scott =

American actor (born 1973)

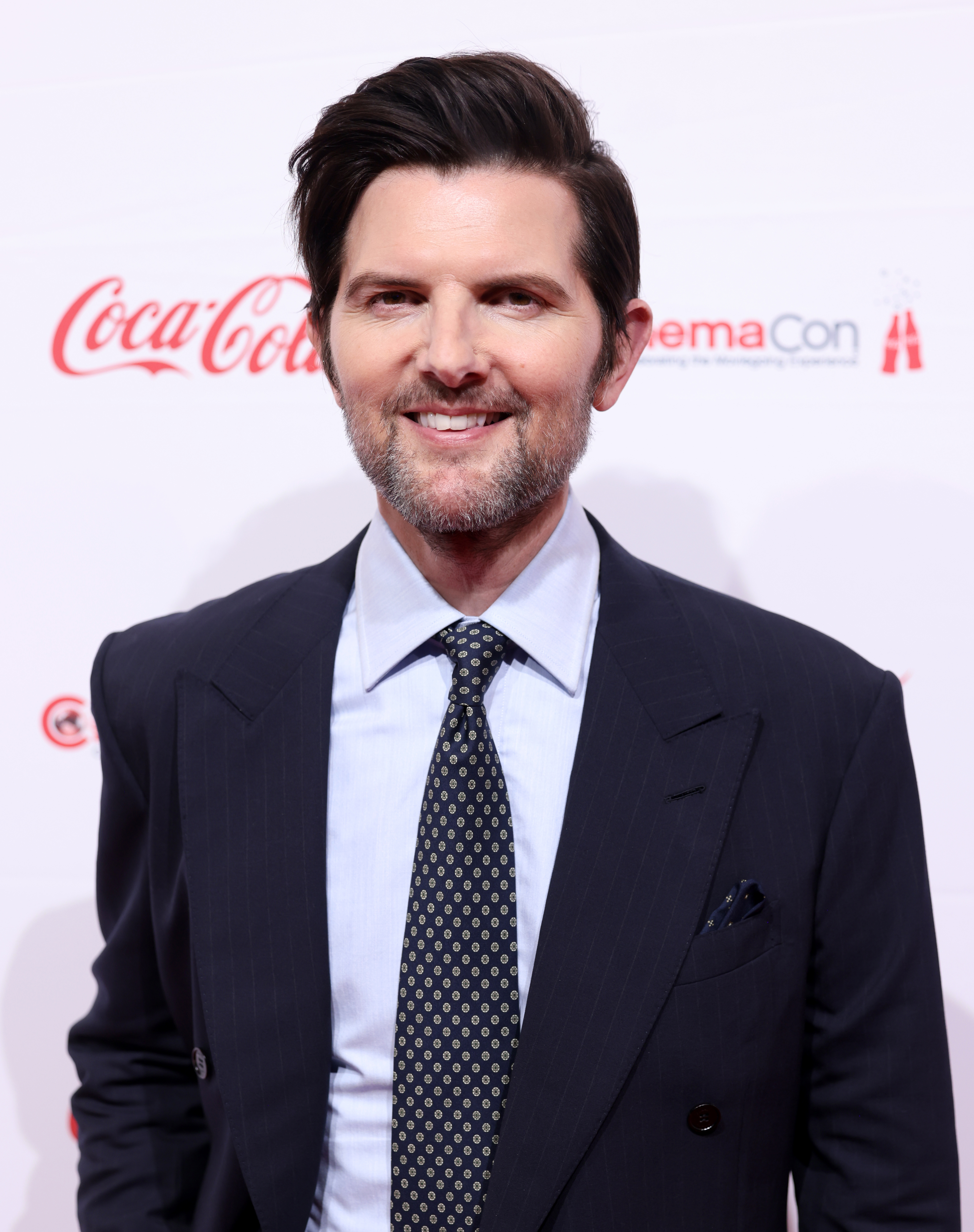
- Scott at the 2026 Las Vegas CinemaCon
- Born: Adam Paul Scott; April 3, 1973 (age 53); Santa Cruz, California, U.S.
- Education: American Academy of Dramatic Arts
- Occupations: Actor; comedian
- Years active: 1994–present
- Spouse: Naomi Sablan (m. 2005)
- Children: 2

Adam Paul Scott (born April 3, 1973) is an American actor and comedian. He is best known for his role as Ben Wyatt in the NBC sitcom Parks and Recreation (2010–2015), for which he was twice nominated for a Critics' Choice Television Award, as well as Mark Scout in the Apple TV sci-fi thriller series Severance, for which he was nominated for four Primetime Emmy Awards (two for acting and two for producing) and two Golden Globes, among others.

Scott has also appeared in films, including The Aviator (2004), Step Brothers (2008) and Hokum (2026), as well as the Starz sitcom Party Down (2009–2010; 2023), the HBO drama series Big Little Lies (2017–present), and the NBC comedy series The Good Place (2016–2018).

== Early life and education ==
Adam Paul Scott was born in Santa Cruz, California, on April 3, 1973, son of Dougald Scott. His parents, who were both teachers, divorced when he was a child. His father is of Scottish descent, while his mother is half Sicilian Italian and half Irish. He has two older siblings, Shannon and David.

He graduated from Harbor High School in Santa Cruz and the American Academy of Dramatic Arts in Los Angeles.

== Career ==
=== 1994–2007: Early film and television work ===
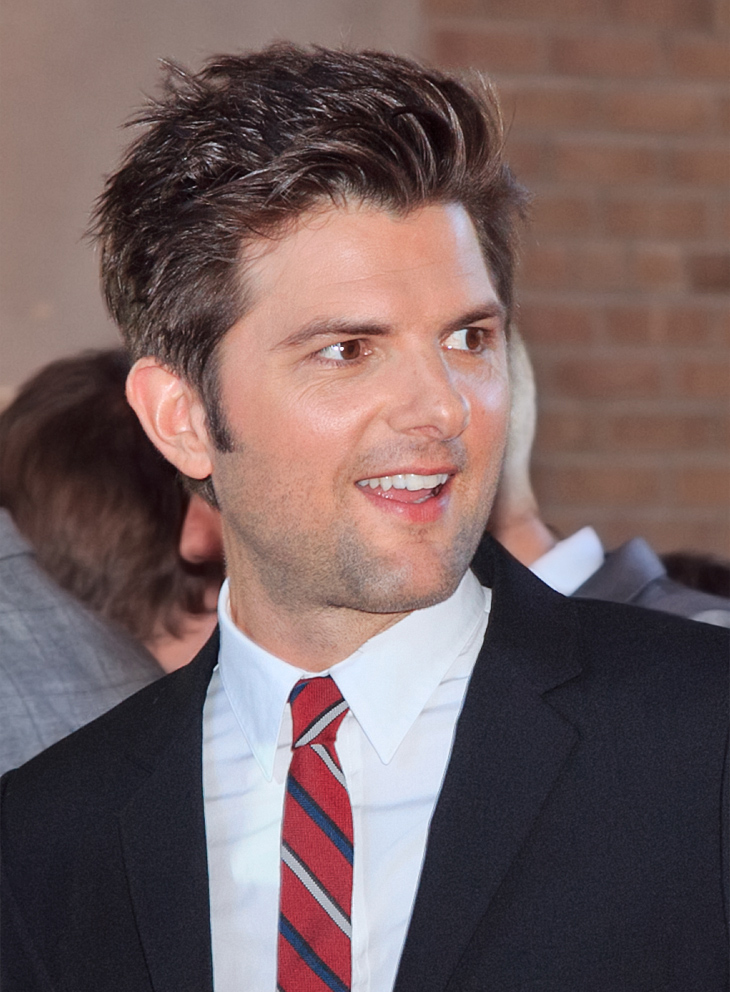
Scott at the 2011 Toronto International Film Festival

Scott appeared in several feature films, starting with Hellraiser: Bloodline (1996). On being cast in that film, Scott said: "I remember just being excited because it was a real movie, and I didn’t care if it was shitty. And it did end up being very, very shitty, but I was just happy to have a job." Other films he went on to appear in included Star Trek: First Contact (1996), The Lesser Evil (1998), High Crimes (2002), The Aviator (2004), Torque (2004), Monster-in-Law (2005), The Matador (2005), and Knocked Up (2007). Scott's early television roles include Griff Hawkins in Boy Meets World, Josh on Party of Five, a law intern on Murder One, as well as David's love interest, Ben Cooper, on Six Feet Under. His first series regular role was on the controversial and sexually-explicit HBO drama Tell Me You Love Me (2007) as Palek, a husband struggling to conceive with his wife. In the first two seasons of the HBO baseball comedy series Eastbound & Down, Scott played a cocaine-addicted baseball front office representative. He also appeared on CSI: Miami and Law & Order.

=== 2008–2015: Parks and Recreation and comedy films ===
From 2009 to 2010, Scott starred as Henry Pollard in the Starz network show Party Down. For this performance, he earned an Entertainment Weekly Ewwy nomination for Best Actor in a Comedy Series. In 2010, Scott joined the cast of NBC's acclaimed comedy series Parks and Recreation, in which he played Ben Wyatt, a state auditor who arrives in the fictional town of Pawnee, Indiana, to evaluate the town's funds and eventually becomes the love interest of Leslie Knope. He appeared as a guest star in the second season before becoming a main character for the remainder of the series, which ended in 2015.

During this period Scott appeared in the films Step Brothers (2008), The Vicious Kind (2009), Piranha 3D (2010), Friends with Kids (2012), The Secret Life of Walter Mitty (2013), and Krampus (2015). Scott attributes his pivot from dramatic to comedic roles to landing the part of Derek Huff in Step Brothers, as he learned comedic improvisation from his co-stars Will Ferrell, John C. Reilly, and Kathryn Hahn.

Scott has appeared in and produced numerous independent films. He starred as Caleb Sinclaire in the 2010 film The Vicious Kind, for which Scott was nominated for an Independent Spirit Award for Best Actor. The film itself received positive reviews, and he won two individual awards at two separate film festivals. He starred in two films by Matt Bissonette, Who Loves the Sun (2006) and Passenger Side (2009), released on DVD on October 26, 2010. He appeared in the films Our Idiot Brother (2011) with Paul Rudd and Leslye Headland's Bachelorette (2012). He had lead roles in Friends with Kids (2012) and A.C.O.D. (2013).

He played antagonist Ted Hendricks, Walter Mitty's boss, in the 2013 Ben Stiller remake of The Secret Life of Walter Mitty. His other major studio comedies include Hot Tub Time Machine 2 and the Christmas comedy-horror film Krampus, both in 2015. That same year, he executive produced and starred in the comedy film The Overnight. Scott and his wife created and produced four Adult Swim mockumentary specials, The Greatest Event in Television History, about remaking opening credits sequences of 1980s television shows. Scott continued his streak of comedic roles in several episodes of Ken Marino's The Bachelor parody Burning Love, as well as making guest appearances in the Adult Swim comedies Childrens Hospital and NTSF:SD:SUV:: and the Comedy Central television show Nick Swardson's Pretend Time as a newscaster in the episode "Relapse into Refreshment". He also appeared in a series of commercials for ESPN's Sunday Night Baseball.

=== 2016–present: Career expansion and Severance ===
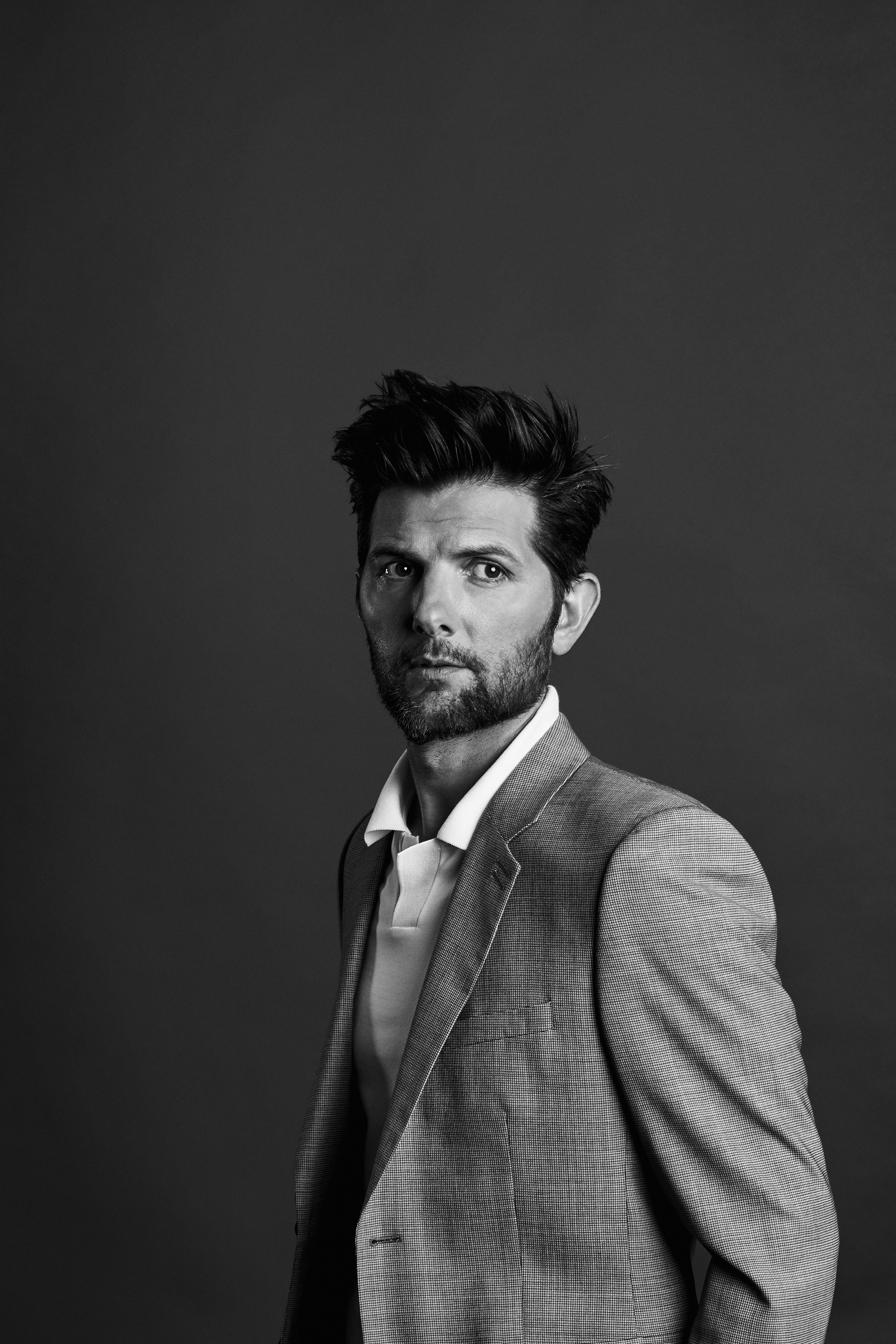
Scott in 2019

From 2016 to 2018, Scott appeared in five episodes of the acclaimed Michael Schur show The Good Place as Trevor, a demon. In 2017, he appeared in David Wain's Wet Hot American Summer: Ten Years Later and made a guest appearance on HBO's Veep. In 2017 and 2019, Scott took a turn to dramatic work by appearing in HBO's Big Little Lies as Ed Mackenzie, husband of main character Madeline Mackenzie, played by Reese Witherspoon.

Scott and Paul Rudd teamed up again to act in and produce the indie comedy Fun Mom Dinner (2017). Scott starred with Craig Robinson in the sitcom Ghosted, which premiered on October 1, 2017, on Fox, lasting just one season. He and his wife executive produced the show. In 2020, Scott hosted the one-season ABC game show Don't, executive produced by Ryan Reynolds.

In 2022, Scott began starring in and executive producing the Apple TV show Severance, which is executive produced and directed by Ben Stiller. His performance was critically acclaimed and has earned him two Emmy nominations for Outstanding Lead Actor in a Drama Series in 2022 and 2025 respectively, and two more nominations for Outstanding Drama Series in those same years as Executive Producer. The cult hit Party Down was revived in 2023, with Scott reprising the character of Henry Pollard. In Sony's Spider-Man Universe, Scott appeared in Madame Web (2024) as a young Ben Parker.

In 2024, it was announced that Scott would star alongside Danielle Deadwyler in the independent thriller, The Saviors.

Scott portrayed the central character in the 2026 thriller The Whisper Man.

== Commercials and advertisements ==
In 2013, Adam Scott appeared in a series of print ads for the BMW 3 Series Gran Turismo. From 2013 to 2018, he starred in commercials for Smirnoff Vodka, Volkswagen, and ESPN’s Sunday Night Baseball. In 2019, Scott played a record label accountant alongside rapper 2 Chainz in the "Expensify This" campaign, which aired during Super Bowl LIII. Scott has also appeared in commercials and print ads for J.Crew, Black Box Wines, Verizon’s "One Unlimited" campaign for the iPhone 14 Pro, and Rowing Blazers/Zodiac Watches. In 2024, he became the spokesperson for Philips Norelco OneBlade. For the second season of Severance, Scott and Ben Stiller appeared in a series of State Farm commercials encouraging viewers to "sever" from their parents’ car insurance.

Since 2024, Scott has also done voice-over work for TaxAct, UKG, and ZipRecruiter. In 2025, Scott and Adam Brody starred in the "It’s Time for WhatsApp" campaign, highlighting the drawbacks of traditional group chats compared with WhatsApp. Scott also appeared alongside his daughter, Frankie, in Volvo’s docuseries "The Family Car." In 2026, Scott voiced a new campaign for Southwest Airlines titled “Enter Airplane Mode”

== Podcasts ==
With Scott Aukerman, Scott is the co-host and co-creator of the Earwolf podcast U Talkin' U2 To Me, launched in February 2014. The series is introduced at the outset of each episode as "the comprehensive and encyclopedic compendium of all things U2," though it generally uses discussion of the band as a jumping off point for improv and absurdist humor. In February 2018, Scott and Aukerman launched another podcast in the same format, this time covering the career and work of the band R.E.M., titled R U Talkin' R.E.M. Re: Me?. A third podcast, R U Talkin' RHCP Re: Me?, debuted in July 2020, in which Scott and Aukerman discuss the Red Hot Chili Peppers; the podcast's format was almost immediately abandoned in favor of discussing Talking Heads and, as of the second episode, was renamed U Talkin' Talking Heads 2 My Talking Head. In September 2023, the show began to focus on discussing the work of Bruce Springsteen, and was renamed U Springin' Springsteen On My Bean?.

On August 6, 2015, Scott and Aukerman interviewed U2 in New York City at Electric Ladyland Studios and again on July 24, 2018 at Madison Square Garden as part of U2's eXPERIENCE + iNNOCENCE Tour.

On April 9, 2019, they interviewed R.E.M.’s bassist and composer Mike Mills on Episode 56 of R U Talkin' R.E.M. RE: ME?, titled "Mike Mills Talkin' R.E.M. and guitarist Peter Buck on June 22, 2019, during a live recording of their podcast at the Clusterfest comedy festival in San Francisco.

Scott and Aukerman interviewed R.E.M. on November 5, 2019 for the Monster 25th Anniversary Edition with Michael Stipe and Mike Mills.

Scott and Aukerman interviewed Huey Lewis on February 18, 2020. The interview was released as a special one-off crossover episode of their podcast network titled "Youey Talkin' Huey 2ey Me?"

Scott has been a guest on many podcasts, including Comedy Bang! Bang!, Never Not Funny, How Did This Get Made?, Armchair Expert with Dax Shepard, Kevin Pollak's Chat Show, Smartless, Good Hang with Amy Poehler, Conan O'Brien Needs a Friend and Where Everybody Knows Your Name with Ted Danson & Woody Harrelson.

== Personal life ==
Scott married producer Naomi Sablan in 2005. They have two children.

On April 30, 2013, Scott threw out the first pitch at a baseball game between the Colorado Rockies and LA Dodgers.

On May 4, 2017, during an appearance on Jimmy Kimmel Live!, Scott revealed he invited actor Mark Hamill to one of his childhood birthday parties. Guest host Kristen Bell surprised Scott with the guest appearance of Hamill wielding a lightsaber in observance of Star Wars Day.

== Filmography ==
=== Film ===
| Year | Title | Role | Notes |
|---|---|---|---|
| 1994 | Cityscrapes: Los Angeles | Joe | |
| 1996 | Hellraiser: Bloodline | Jacques | |
| 1996 | The Last Days of Frankie the Fly | Race Track Valet | |
| 1996 | Star Trek: First Contact | Conn Officer of the USS Defiant | |
| 1997 | Dinner and Driving | Larry | |
| 1998 | Girl | Scott | |
| 1998 | The Lesser Evil | Young George | |
| 1998 | Hairshirt | Fan At Bar | AKA Too Smooth |
| 1999 | Winding Roads | Brian Calhoun | |
| 2001 | Date Squad | Fred | Short film |
| 2001 | Seven and a Match | Peter | |
| 2002 | Ronnie | Ronnie Schwann | |
| 2002 | High Crimes | Lieutenant Terrence Embry | |
| 2002 | Bleach | Fulton | Short film |
| 2003 | Something More | Saul | Short film |
| 2003 | Two Days | Stu | |
| 2004 | Torque | FBI Agent Jay McPherson | |
| 2004 | Off the Lip | David | |
| 2004 | The Aviator | Johnny Meyer | |
| 2005 | The Matador | Phil Garrison | |
| 2005 | Monster-in-Law | Remy | |
| 2006 | Art School Confidential | Marvin Bushmiller | |
| 2006 | First Snow | Tom Morelane | |
| 2006 | When the Nines Roll Over | Record Label Executive | Short film |
| 2006 | Who Loves the Sun | Daniel Bloom | |
| 2006 | The Return | Kurt | |
| 2007 | Superbad: Cop Car Confessions | Adam | Bonus feature on the Superbad DVD |
| 2007 | Knocked Up | Nurse Samuel | |
| 2008 | The Great Buck Howard | Alan Berkman | |
| 2008 | August | Joshua Sterling | |
| 2008 | Corporate Affairs | Jack Hightower | |
| 2008 | Step Brothers | Derek Huff | |
| 2008 | Lovely, Still | Mike Malone | |
| 2009 | The Vicious Kind | Caleb Sinclaire | |
| 2009 | Passenger Side | Michael Brown | Also executive producer |
| 2010 | Operation: Endgame | The Magician | |
| 2010 | Funny or Die Presents: AIDS: We Did It! | Man | Short film |
| 2010 | Leap Year | Jeremy Sloane | |
| 2010 | Piranha 3D | Novak Radzinsky | |
| 2011 | Fight for Your Right Revisited | Cab Driver | Short film |
| 2011 | When Harry Met Sally 2 with Billy Crystal and Helen Mirren | Movie Executive | Short film |
| 2011 | Funny or Die Presents: The First A.D. | | Writer and director |
| 2011 | Our Idiot Brother | Jeremy Horne | |
| 2011 | Friends with Kids | Jason Fryman | |
| 2012 | Bachelorette | Clyde Goddard | |
| 2012 | HJ Gloves | Man #2 | Short film |
| 2012 | All Star Bowling Trick Shots | Himself | Short film |
| 2012 | See Girl Run | Jason | |
| 2012 | The Guilt Trip | Andrew Margolis Jr. | |
| 2013 | A.C.O.D. | Carter | Also executive producer |
| 2013 | The Secret Life of Walter Mitty | Ted Hendricks | |
| 2014 | They Came Together | Sound Engineer | Cameo |
| 2015 | The Overnight | Alex | Also executive producer |
| 2015 | Sleeping with Other People | Dr. Matthew Sobvechik | |
| 2015 | Hot Tub Time Machine 2 | Adam Yates Jr. | |
| 2015 | Black Mass | Robert Fitzpatrick | |
| 2015 | Krampus | Tom Engel | |
| 2016 | Other People | | Producer |
| 2016 | My Blind Brother | Robbie | |
| 2017 | Fun Mom Dinner | Tom | Also executive producer |
| 2017 | The Disaster Artist | Himself | Cameo |
| 2017 | The Most Hated Woman in America | Jack Ferguson | |
| 2017 | Flower | Will Jordan | |
| 2017 | Little Evil | Gary Bloom | |
| 2019 | Between Two Ferns: The Movie | Himself | |
| 2020 | Have a Good Trip: Adventures in Psychedelics | After School Special Host | |
| 2023 | First Time Female Director | Acting Coach | Uncredited cameo |
| 2024 | Madame Web | Ben Parker | |
| 2025 | The Monkey | Capt. Petey Shelburn | |
| 2026 | The Saviors | Sean Harrison | Also producer |
| 2026 | Hokum | Ohm Bauman | |
| 2026 | The Whisper Man | Tom Kennedy | |

=== Television ===
| Year | Title | Role | Notes |
|---|---|---|---|
| 1994 | Dead at 21 | Dan Bird | Episode: "Dead at 21" |
| 1994–1995 | Boy Meets World | Senior / Griff Hawkins | 4 episodes |
| 1995 | ER | David Kerstetter | Episode: "Full Moon, Saturday Night" |
| 1995 | Out of Order | Paul | Episode: "Strange Habit" |
| 1995 | Murder One | Sydney Schneider | 6 episodes |
| 1995 | Crosstown Traffic | Montana | TV Pilot |
| 1996 | NYPD Blue | Gordon Puterbaugh | Episode: "The Nutty Confessor" |
| 1996 | High Incident | Walter Gonning Jr. | Episode: "Change Partners" |
| 1997 | Payback | Adam Stanfill | Television Movie |
| 1998–1999 | Party of Five | Josh Macon | 7 episodes |
| 1999 | Wasteland | Phillip "The Coffee Boy" | 7 episodes |
| 1999 | Sagamore | Alex | TV Pilot |
| 2002 | Glory Days | Howard Dichotsky | Episode: "Everybody Loves Rudy" |
| 2002 | Six Feet Under | Ben Cooper | 2 episodes |
| 2004 | CSI: Miami | Danny Cato | Episode: "Stalkerazzi" |
| 2005 | Veronica Mars | Chuck Rooks | Episode: "Mars vs. Mars" |
| 2006 | Law & Order | Robbie Howell | Episode: "America, Inc." |
| 2007 | Tell Me You Love Me | Palek | 10 episodes |
| 2009 | Trust Me | Josh Burkett | 2 episodes |
| 2009–2010 | Eastbound & Down | Pat Anderson | 2 episodes |
| 2009–2010, 2023 | Party Down | Henry Pollard | 26 episodes; also executive producer |
| 2010 | The Sarah Silverman Program | Agent Schroeder | Episode: "Just Breve" |
| 2010 | Childrens Hospital | Lieutenant D'Ghor Koru | Episode: "Joke Overload" |
| 2010 | Nick Swardson's Pretend Time | News Anchor | Episode: "Mudslide Junction" |
| 2010 | The Wonderful Maladys | Alice's Ex-Boyfriend | TV Pilot |
| 2010 | American Dad! | Marshall | Voice; Episode: "The People vs. Martin Sugar" |
| 2010–2015, 2020 | Parks and Recreation | Ben Wyatt | 98 episodes Directed episode: "Farmers Market" |
| 2011 | Funny or Die Presents: "The Terrys" | Narrator | Episode #2.10 |
| 2011 | NTSF:SD:SUV:: | Van Damm | Episode: "The Risky Business of Being Alone in Your Home" |
| 2012–2013 | Burning Love | Damien Assante | 6 episodes |
| 2012–2014 | The Greatest Event in Television History | AJ Simon / Monroe Fiscus / Jonathan Hart / Henry Desmond (Hildegard) | 4 episodes; also creator, director and executive producer |
| 2013 | Robot Chicken | Care Bear / Father | Voice; Episode: "Botched Jewel Heist" |
| 2013 | Maron | Himself | Episode: "Mexican Angel" |
| 2013 | Drunk History | John Wilkes Booth | Episode: "Washington D.C." |
| 2013 | Timms Valley | US Marshal Lonny | Voice; TV Pilot |
| 2014 | Next Time on Lonny | Richard Chicken | Episode #2.10 "The End of Lonny" |
| 2015 | Comedy Bang! Bang! | Plumber Pierre | Episode: "Jack Black Wears an Embroidered Cowboy Shirt and Ox Blood Sneakers" |
| 2015 | Sesame Street | Himself | Episode: "Oscar's Trash Savings Plan" |
| 2016 | Angie Tribeca | Surgeon | Episode: "The Wedding Planner Did It" |
| 2016 | Animals. | Shane | Voice; Episode: "Cats." |
| 2016 | Bajillion Dollar Propertie$ | Johnny Dunne | Episode: "Meet Platinum" |
| 2016 | The Adult Swim Golf Classic | Golfer Adam Scott | TV special |
| 2016–2018 | The Good Place | Trevor | 5 episodes |
| 2017, 2019 | Big Little Lies | Ed MacKenzie | 14 episodes |
| 2017 | Michael Bolton's Big, Sexy Valentine's Day Special | Himself | Variety special |
| 2017 | Veep | Tonight Show Host | Episode: "A Woman First" |
| 2017 | Wet Hot American Summer: Ten Years Later | Ben | 7 episodes |
| 2017 | Do You Want to See a Dead Body? | Himself | Episode: "A Body and a Puddle" |
| 2017–2018 | Ghosted | Max Jennifer | 16 episodes; also executive producer |
| 2018 | I Love You, America with Sarah Silverman | George Washington | Episode: "Hall of Presidents" |
| 2019 | I'm Sorry | Dr. Steve Goldberg | Episode: "These Are My Fingers" |
| 2019 | The Twilight Zone | Justin Sanderson | Episode: "Nightmare at 30,000 Feet" |
| 2020 | Nailed It! | Himself (guest judge) | Episode: "Howdy, Failure!" |
| 2020 | Celebrity Escape Room | Himself | TV special |
| 2020 | Don't | Host | 8 episodes; also executive producer |
| 2021 | Ghostwriter | James | Voice; 1 episode; also executive producer |
| 2021 | Duncanville | Nick | Voice; Episode: "Das Banana Boot" |
| 2021 | Big Mouth | Mr. Keating | Voice; Episode: "Green-Eyed Monster" |
| 2022–present | Severance | Mark Scout / Mark S. | Main role; also executive producer |
| 2022–2025 | Loot | John Novak | 9 episodes |
| 2022 | Inside Job | Ron Staedtler | Voice; 5 episodes |
| 2024 | Dinner Time Live with David Chang | Himself | Episode: "United Plates of America" |
| 2025 | The Studio | Himself | Episode: "The Golden Globes" |
| 2026 | Strip Law | Lincoln Gumb | Voice; 10 episodes |
| 2026 | The Comeback | Matt Wright | Episode: "Valerie Cherish" |

=== Theater ===
| Year | Title | Role | Playwright | Venue |
|---|---|---|---|---|
| 1993 | Bloody Poetry | Dr. William Polidori | Howard Brenton | Globe Theatre, Los Angeles |
| 1995 | Water and Wine | Enrico | Stuart Spencer | Met Theatre, Los Angeles |
| 1996 | Uncle Bob | Josh | Austin Pendleton | SoHo Playhouse - Off Broadway, Asylum Theater, Los Angeles and Edinburgh Scotland |
| 1998 | Dealer's Choice | Carl | Patrick Marber | Mark Taper Forum |
| 2000 | Everett Beekin | Jimmy/Ev | Richard Greenberg | South Coast Repertory |
| 2001 | Romeo and Juliet | Romeo | William Shakespeare | California Shakespeare Festival, Bruns Memorial Amphitheater |
| 2010 | Friends with Kids | Jason Fryman | Jennifer Westfeldt | Susan Stein Shiva Theater, New York |
| 2026 | Smear! | Congressman Cooper Huff | Clark Gregg | Studio Seaview Off-Broadway Theater, New York |

== Awards and nominations ==
| Organizations | Year | Category | Work | Result | Ref. |
|---|---|---|---|---|---|
| AFI Awards | 2009 | Outstanding Television Program of the Year | Party Down | Won | |
| AFI Awards | 2011 | Outstanding Television Program of the Year | Parks and Recreation | Won | |
| AFI Awards | 2022 | Outstanding Television Program of the Year | Severance | Won | |
| AFI Awards | 2025 | Outstanding Television Program of the Year | Severance | Won | |
| Cannes International TV Series Film Festival | 2026 | Icon Award | —N/a | Honored | |
| CinemaCon | 2026 | Award of Excellence in Acting | —N/a | Honored | |
| Fangoria Chainsaw Awards | 2026 | Best Lead Performance | Hokum | Nominated | |
| Critics' Choice Television Awards | 2013 | Best Actor in a Comedy Series | Parks and Recreation | Nominated | |
| Critics' Choice Television Awards | 2014 | Best Actor in a Comedy Series | Parks and Recreation | Nominated | |
| Critics' Choice Television Awards | 2023 | Best Actor in a Drama Series | Severance | Nominated | |
| Critics' Choice Television Awards | 2023 | Best Actor in a Science Fiction/Fantasy Series | Severance | Won | |
| Critics' Choice Television Awards | 2025 | Best Actor in a Science Fiction/Fantasy Series | Severance | Nominated | |
| Critics' Choice Television Awards | 2025 | Best Actor in a Drama Series | Severance | Nominated | |
| Critics' Choice Super Awards | 2026 | Best Actor in a Horror Movie | Hokum | Nominated | |
| Independent Spirit Awards | 2009 | Best Lead Actor | The Vicious Kind | Nominated | |
| Independent Spirit Awards | 2016 | Best First Feature | Other People | Nominated | |
| Independent Spirit Awards | 2022 | Best Lead Performance in a New Scripted Series | Severance | Nominated | |
| Golden Globe Awards | 2022 | Best Actor in a Television Series – Drama | Severance | Nominated | |
| Golden Globe Awards | 2026 | Best Actor in a Television Series – Drama | Severance | Nominated | |
| HCA TV Awards | 2022 | Best Actor in a Streaming Series, Drama | Severance | Nominated | |
| HCA TV Awards | 2023 | Best Actor in a Cable Series, Comedy | Party Down | Nominated | |
| HCA TV Awards | 2023 | Best Comedy Cable Series | Party Down | Won | |
| HCA TV Awards | 2025 | Best Guest Actor in a Comedy Series | The Studio | Nominated | |
| HCA TV Awards | 2025 | Best Drama Series | Severance | Won | |
| HCA TV Awards | 2025 | Best Cast Ensemble in a Drama Series | Severance | Nominated | |
| HCA TV Awards | 2025 | Best Actor in a Drama Series | Severance | Nominated | |
| Miami Film Festival | 2026 | Vanguard Award | —N/a | Honored | |
| Peabody Awards | 2022 | Entertainment | Severance | Won | |
| Primetime Emmy Awards | 2022 | Outstanding Drama Series | Severance (season one) | Nominated | |
| Primetime Emmy Awards | 2022 | Outstanding Lead Actor in a Drama Series | Severance (episode: "Good News About Hell") | Nominated | |
| Primetime Emmy Awards | 2025 | Outstanding Drama Series | Severance (season two) | Nominated | |
| Primetime Emmy Awards | 2025 | Outstanding Lead Actor in a Drama Series | Severance (episode: "Cold Harbor") | Nominated | |
| Producers Guild of America Awards | 2022 | Outstanding Producer of Episodic Television, Drama | Severance (season one) | Nominated | |
| Saturn Awards | 2022 | Best Actor in a Streaming Television Series | Severance | Nominated | |
| Screen Actors Guild Awards | 2019 | Outstanding Ensemble in a Drama Series | Big Little Lies | Nominated | |
| Screen Actors Guild Awards | 2022 | Outstanding Ensemble in a Drama Series | Severance (season one) | Nominated | |
| Screen Actors Guild Awards | 2022 | Outstanding Actor in a Drama Series | Severance (season one) | Nominated | |
| Screen Actors Guild Awards | 2025 | Outstanding Ensemble in a Drama Series | Severance (season two) | Nominated | |
| Teen Choice Awards | 2019 | Choice TV Villain | The Good Place | Nominated | |
| Time Magazine | 2025 | 100 most influential people | —N/a | Honored | |
| Webby Awards | 2022 | Best Actor | Severance | Won | |
