= Roberto Enrique =

American singer-songwriter

Roberto Enrique is an actor, singer, and songwriter from Los Angeles, California. He is primarily known for his acting career.

== Music ==
Enrique had his album debut at the age of 14 with Locamente Enamorado (1999), followed by Condenda (2000). Alongside the releases of these albums, Enrique began performing regional Mexican songs in various venues in the United States. In October 2006, he released the album Nuevo Día, which combined pop and regional Mexican music.

== Albums ==
- Nuevo Dia (2006) Planetal Records / DLN Distribution
- Condena (2000) Sony Discos
- Locamenta Enamorado (1999) Sony Discos

== Acting ==
As an actor, he has appeared on The Shield and Grounded for Life. He also appeared in the Nickelodeon television movie The Brothers García–Mysteries of the Maya, which was directed by Jeff Valdez. His work in the short film Roam earned him a "Best Actor" nomination at the Independent Film Festival Methodfest. He starred in the independent film The Hungry Woman (2007).

== Television and filmography ==
1. Passenger Side (2009)
2. Grounded for Life (2004)
3. Siempre (2004)
4. The Brothers Garcia: Mysteries of the Maya (2003)
5. The Shield (2003)
6. Los Patriotas (2002)
7. Roam (2001)
8. Un Pedazo de Tierraa.k.a. A Piece of Earth (2001)
9. Trauco's Daughter (2001)
10. Road Dogz (2000)
