= Lynne Stopkewich =

Canadian film director (born 1964)

- Born: 1964 (age 61–62); Montreal, Quebec
- Education: Concordia University, University of British Columbia
- Occupation: Film director
- Years active: 1990s–present

Lynne Stopkewich (born 1964) is a Canadian film director. She attracted attention for her feature film directorial debut Kissed (1996).

== Life and career ==
In 1987, Stopkewich obtained her Bachelor of Fine Arts Degree in film studies from Concordia University, followed in 1996 by a Master of Fine Arts Degree in film studies from the Department of Theatre and Film at the University of British Columbia. Her first short films were made while at Concordia.

=== Kissed ===
Kissed commenced development as Stopkewich's thesis feature at the University of British Columbia, to which Stopkewich later returned as a faculty member. The film stars Molly Parker as Sandra Larson, a young woman whose fixation on death leads her to study embalming at a mortuary school, where in turn she finds herself drawn toward feelings of necrophilia. Peter Outerbridge also stars as Matt, a fellow student who develops romantic feelings for Sandra, and so must learn to accept her sexual proclivities. Despite being allowed a substantial grant, Stopkewich went almost $30,000 into debt and cost her company $400,000 so she could complete shooting the film.

The film received significant attention. Roger Ebert described the film as "one of the most controversial films at the Toronto and Sundance festivals" and gave the film a three-star review, noting that it "is about a necrophiliac, but in its approach, it could be about spirituality or transcendence." The New York Times noted that "it would be easy to snicker at this Canadian film, were its subject not handled with a delicacy and lyricism that underscore the mystical rather than gruesome aspects of what Sandra coolly acknowledges is a consuming addiction."

=== Other work ===
In addition to Kissed, Stopkewich has directed the feature film Suspicious River (2000). She has also directed various television episodes of Bliss, Da Vinci's Inquest, The L Word, This Is Wonderland, and The Shields Stories. Stopkewich generally prefers to work with cast and crew with whom she has worked before, most notably, the actress Molly Parker.

Stopkewich's approach to the gaze in film is in part informed by feminist film theory, and thus her films have been described as being "darkly feminist." Canadians also see in her films "a strong sense of local culture" which rises "above the American appropriation of Vancouver as a backdrop for American generic culture."

She is the Vancouver director on Here At Home, a 2012 National Film Board of Canada web documentary exploring the Mental Health Commission of Canada's efforts to end homelessness for people with mental illness via its At Home initiative.
