= Passenger Side =

- Theatrical release poster
- Directed by: Matt Bissonnette
- Screenplay by: Matthew Bissonnette
- Produced by: Corey Marr
- Starring: Adam Scott; Joel Bissonnette; Robin Tunney; Gale Harold
- Cinematography: Jonathon Cliff
- Edited by: Matthew Hannam
- Distributed by: Strand Releasing; IFC Films; Corey Marr Productions Axiom Films (UK and Ireland)
- Release date: June 2009
- Running time: 85 minutes
- Country: Canada
- Language: English

Passenger Side is a 2009 drama film written and directed by Matt Bissonnette and produced by Corey Marr. It stars Adam Scott, Joel Bissonnette and Robin Tunney. It premiered at the 2009 Los Angeles Film Festival before screening at numerous film festivals worldwide, including the Toronto International Film Festival, BFI London Film Festival and Whistler Film Festival.

It won the Citytv Award for Best Canadian Feature at the Edmonton International Film Festival, and was named to TIFF's annual year-end Canada's Top Ten list for 2009.

Passenger Side was released theatrically in Canada in May 2009 by Corey Marr Productions and Kinosmith. It has been picked up by Strand Releasing in the U.S., Axiom Film in the U.K. and IFC Films internationally.

== Plot ==
On the morning of his thirty-seventh birthday, Michael Brown (Adam Scott) receives a telephone call from his estranged brother Tobey (Joel Bissonnette). The two set off on a day-long odyssey in Michael's old BMW across a wild and weird Los Angeles in search of Tobey's “reason for living.” They encounter a series of surprising, comical characters and reach an unexpected, magical destination.

== Cast ==
- Adam Scott as Michael Brown
- Joel Bissonnette as Tobey Brown
- Richard Medina as Man with Knife
- Mickey Cottrell as Suspicious Man
- Vitta Quinn as Carla
- Dimitri Coats as Goofus
- Victor Martinez as Alberto
- Roberto Enrique as Manuel
- Penelope Allen as Henrietta
- Kimberly Huie as Laurie
- Greg Dulli as Porn Director
- Gale Harold as Karl
- Maja Miletich as Karen
- Rachael Santhon as Anna
- Adam Balsam as Porn PA
- Travis Walck as Gas Station Attendant
- Sean Parker as Dog
- Robin Tunney as Theresa

== Music ==
Music features heavily in the film, including songs by numerous Canadian performers, such as D.O.A., Leonard Cohen, and SNFU.

=== Soundtrack ===
- “Punks in the Beerlight” Written by David Berman Performed by Silver Jews
- “Hit the Ground Running” Written by William Callahan Performed by Smog
- “Cannibal Café” Written by Mr. Chi Pig and Muc Performed by SNFU
- “Mini T.V.’s” Written and performed by Chad VanGaalen
- “Ordinary Night” Written and performed by the Mekons
- “Kid Dynamite” Written by David Grubbs Performed by Squirrel Bait
- “The Goldheart Mountaintop Queen Directory” Written by Robert Pollard Performed by Guided By Voices
- “Good Guys & Bad Guys” Written and performed by Camper Van Beethoven
- “Call of the Wild” Written by Alex & Carlos Soria Performed by The Nils
- “Final Day” Written by Stuart Moxham Performed by Young Marble Giants
- “Jak” Written by Peter Prescott Performed by Volcano Suns
- “Driveway to Driveway” Written by Laura Balance, Ralph McCaughan, James Wilbur, and Jonathan Wurster Performed by Superchunk
- “Freak Scene” Written by J Mascis Performed by Dinosaur Jr.
- “Fucked Up Ronnie” Written by Joe Keithley Performed by D.O.A.
- “Isabel” Written by Mark Robinson Performed by Unrest
- “Wild Sage” Written by John Darnielle Performed by The Mountain Goats
- “We Saw Jerry’s Daughter” Written and performed by Camper Van Beethoven
- “Rough Gem” Written by Nicholas Thorburn Performed by Islands
- “Be What You Want” Written by Freisen, John Kastner, Remington, Plenty Performed by Asexuals
- “Suzanne” Written and performed by Leonard Cohen
- “You Don’t Have to Make Me Feel Better” Written and Performed by Mac McCaughan
- “Last Night on Earth” Written and performed by the Mekons
- “Graveyard” Written and performed by Chad VanGaalen
- “Hard Drive” Written by Ben Lee Performed by Evan Dando
- “Passenger Side” Written by Jeff Tweedy Performed by Wilco
