= Impact (miniseries) =

- Genre: Action
- Written by: Michael Vickerman
- Directed by: Mike Rohl
- Starring: David James Elliott; Natasha Henstridge; Benjamin Sadler; Steven Culp; James Cromwell; Florentine Lahme
- Theme music composer: Michael Richard Plowman
- Countries of origin: Canada; Germany; Greece
- Original language: English
- No. of episodes: 2

Production
- Producers: Jonas Bauer; Rola Bauer; Howard Braunstein; Michael Prupas; Tim Halkin; Greg Gugliotta; Irene Litinsky; Ted Bauman; Jesse Prupas
- Production location: Victoria, British Columbia
- Editor: Lisa Robison
- Running time: 182 minutes
- Production company: Impact Films
- Budget: 14 Mil. USD

Original release
- Network: Super Channel
- Release: February 14 – February 15, 2009

Impact is a 2009 Canadian action disaster miniseries directed by Mike Rohl, written by Michael Vickerman and distributed by Tandem Communications, starring David James Elliott, Natasha Henstridge, Benjamin Sadler, Steven Culp, James Cromwell and Florentine Lahme as the story follows a meteor shower which eventually sends the Moon on a collision course with Earth. The two-part (Episodes were called Nights) mini-series premiered February 14 and 15, 2009 on the Canadian premium television channel Super Channel and was also shown on ABC on June 21 and 28, 2009 and on Alpha TV in September 2011. The mini-series was released to DVD by Sony Pictures Home Entertainment.

== Plot ==
During a meteor shower said to be the most spectacular in 10,000 years, an asteroid hidden by the meteor field strikes the Moon. Fragments of the asteroid and of the Moon itself penetrate Earth's atmosphere and make impact. The initial damage is minimal, though significant physical damage to the lunar surface can be seen from Earth. Experts believe that the Moon has stabilized into a slightly closer orbit. Then strange anomalies begin to manifest themselves on Earth, including cell phone disruptions, unusual static discharges and odd tidal behavior. The world's leading scientists, including Alex Kittner, Maddie Rhodes, and Roland Emerson, begin piecing together evidence that suggests the Moon's properties have been permanently altered because the asteroid that hit the Moon was actually a fragment of a brown dwarf the remnant of a dead star; the fragment is highly magnetized and more massive than the Earth despite being only 19 kilometers across, and it is still lodged inside the Moon. When the Moon's new, more elliptical orbit brings it closer to Earth, electromagnetic surges begin affecting the surface, causing people, vehicles, and other objects to levitate at random, worldwide. Alex, Maddie, Roland and the rest of their team soon discover that the Moon's new orbit will cause it to collide with the Earth in 39 days, completely annihilating the planet. After a failed attempt by the United States to destroy the Moon with nuclear missiles, the three scientists plan an international mission to the Moon, where the astronauts must construct a device to magnetize the Moon's core, causing it to disgorge the embedded brown dwarf fragment, eliminating the magnetic effects and restoring the Moon to a stable orbit. Because of their unique expertise, Alex and Roland must join an American astronaut, Flight Commander Courtney Batterton, and a Russian cosmonaut, Lunar Module Pilot Sergei Pitinkov on the mission, which is expected to be a one-way trip.

Roland's pregnant fiancée, Martina Altmann, was travelling across Germany on a train that levitated and derailed. She and an American, Bob Pierce, are able to lead the survivors to a military convoy, and Bob convinces the soldiers to allow Martina to ride to Roland's location. She and Roland are immediately married. Alex's children are left in the care of their late mother's father, Lloyd. When they attempt to drive cross-country to reunite with Alex, their car levitates and crashes. After a confrontation with a man named Derek who is hoarding resources at a convenience store, the children's grandfather suffers a fatal heart attack and later passes away. Derek originally plans to leave alone, but reconsiders and brings the children to Washington, DC. Alex is already in space, but he had asked Maddie, with whom he once had a romantic relationship with back then, to make sure his children remained safe. He is able to tell his children "goodbye" over a video feed.

On the Moon, the electromagnetic machine is assembled. Roland and Courtney, travel in a hovercraft to locate a fissure in the lunar surface. The hovercraft is struck by some debris and crashes deep inside the fissure and Courtney falls deep into the fissure. Roland is unharmed but is stuck inside the fissure and is unable to rejoin the spacecraft. He demands that Sergei, launch the module so that he and Alex can be saved. The device is activated and the missile is launched, causing a large explosion on the Moon, which incinerates Roland. The Moon splits in two as the brown dwarf fragment flies into the Sun. The orbit of the 2 halves of the lunar debris is stable. Sergei and Alex make radio contact, revealing that they managed to escape the Moon before the explosion. Back on Earth, Alex is reunited with his children and with Maddie whom they all decide to go back home to Canada, right as Alex and Maddie look up into the sky and check out the 2 halves of the moon in its new orbit right before they get inside the car.

== Main cast ==
- David James Elliott as Alex Kittner
- Natasha Henstridge as Maddie Rhodes
- Benjamin Sadler as Roland Emerson
- Steven Culp as President Edward Taylor
- James Cromwell as Alex's father-in-law
- Florentine Lahme as Martina Altmann
- Natasha Calis as Sadie Kittner
- Samantha Ferris as Renee Ferguson
- Ty Olsson as Derek
- Yee Jee Tso as Jered O'Banno
- Alex Zahara as Franz Henke

=== Filming locations ===
- Victoria, British Columbia, Canada — Central Park, University of Victoria, Dominion Astrophysical Observatory (CNRC)
- Berlin, Germany

== Scientific reaction ==
The Impact mini-series received little comment from the scientific community due to its lack of realism, incorrect use of terminology, and basic misunderstanding of the law of gravity.
