= Crossing Lines =

Multinational action crime thriller television series

- Genre: Crime drama
- Created by: Edward Allen Bernero; Rola Bauer
- Written by: Edward Allen Bernero
- Starring: William Fichtner; Marc Lavoine; Gabriella Pession; Tom Wlaschiha; Moon Dailly; Richard Flood; Donald Sutherland; Goran Visnjic; Elizabeth Mitchell; Naomi Battrick; Stuart Martin
- Opening theme: Seasons 1–2 theme "Theme from Crossing Lines"; Season 3 theme "Friction" by Imagine Dragons
- Countries of origin: Germany; United States; Italy; France
- Original language: English
- No. of seasons: 3
- No. of episodes: 34

Production
- Executive producers: Edward Allen Bernero; Rola Bauer; Jonas Bauer; Tim Halkin
- Cinematography: James Welland et al.
- Camera setup: Single camera
- Running time: 46–48 minutes
- Production companies: Tandem Communications; Bernero Productions; TF1 Productions; Sony Pictures Television; Stillking Films; Big Light Productions

Original release
- Network: Rai 2 (Italy); TF1 (France); NBC (season 1) (United States); Ovation (seasons 2–3) (United States); Sat.1 (Germany)
- Release: June 23, 2013 – December 4, 2015

Crossing Lines is an internationally co-produced crime drama television series created and executive produced by Edward Allen Bernero and Rola Bauer. The series premiered on June 9, 2013, at the Festival de Télévision de Monte-Carlo. Its first television broadcast was in Italy on June 14, 2013, on Rai 2, and it premiered in the United States on NBC on June 23, 2013.

The show was renewed for a second season by TF1, and was released in its entirety on Amazon Prime Instant Video in the United Kingdom on August 15, 2014. Netflix carried the series' first two seasons. On February 20, 2015, the show was renewed for a third season, which went to air on September 15, 2015.

== Plot ==
Former New York Police Department officer Carl Hickman's life has fallen apart after he was injured on the job; he has become addicted to morphine and works as a garbage collector at a carnival in the Netherlands. He is recruited to join the International Criminal Court's special crime unit (a fictional unit). Based in The Hague, it investigates a variety of crimes that cross international boundaries. The unit includes an anti–organized crime expert, a covert specialist from Italy, a technical specialist from Germany, a crimes analyst, a human-trafficking specialist from France and a weapons specialist and tactical expert from Northern Ireland.

== Cast ==
=== Main ===
- William Fichtner as Carlton "Carl" Hickman (seasons 1–2), Detective First Grade, NYPD from the United States
- Marc Lavoine as Louis Daniel (seasons 1–2), Major, Direction Centrale de la Police Judiciaire / International Criminal Court from France
- Gabriella Pession as Eva Vittoria (seasons 1–2), Sovrintendente (Sergeant), Nucleo Operativo Centrale di Sicurezza / Sergeant, Europol from Italy
- Richard Flood as Tommy McConnell (seasons 1–2), Detective, Police Service of Northern Ireland from the United Kingdom
- Tom Wlaschiha as Sebastian Berger, Kommissar (Detective), Berliner Polizei from Germany
- Donald Sutherland as Michel Dorn, International Criminal Court from Netherlands
- Moon Dailly as Anne-Marie San (season 1), O.P.J. (Detective), Police Nationale from France
- Genevieve O'Reilly as Sienna Pride (pilot only), Police Inspector, Scotland Yard from the United Kingdom
- Lara Rossi as Arabela Seeger (guest season 1; main seasons 2–3), Inspecteur, Regiokorps Rotterdam Rijnmond from Netherlands
- Goran Visnjic as Marco Constante (season 3), Police Inspector, Milan from Italy
- Elizabeth Mitchell as Carine Strand (season 3), Inspector, Senior Investigator of the International Criminal Court; former Chicago Police Department officer from the United States
- Naomi Battrick as Ellie Delfont-Bogard (season 3), a recent forensic psychologist graduate, Metropolitan Police Service from the United Kingdom
- Stuart Martin as Luke Wilkinson (season 3), Inspector, Metropolitan Police Service from the United Kingdom

=== Recurring ===
- Elsa Mollien as Rebecca Daniel (seasons 1–2), International Criminal Court from France
- Klára Issová as Shari (seasons 1–2), a carnival worker from Netherlands
- Karel Roden as Lev Marianski (seasons 1–2), a Russian crime figure
- Kim Coates as Phillip Genovese (seasons 1–2), a convicted criminal and stalker from the United States
- Rossif Sutherland as Moreau (seasons 1–2), Lieutenant, Prefecture of Police of Paris from France
- Florentine Lahme as Kathrin Eichholtz (seasons 1–2), Hauptkommissarin, Berliner Polizei from Germany
- Marcel Iureș as Alexander Dimitrov (seasons 1–2), a gangland boss and drug dealer from Romania
- Ray Stevenson as Miles Lennon (season 2), Police Superintendent, Scotland Yard from the United Kingdom
- Carrie-Anne Moss as Amanda Andrews (season 2), Detective, NYPD from the United States
- Sophia Myles as Dr. Anna Clarke (season 2), a doctor from the United Kingdom
- Michelle Fairley as Sophie Baines (season 3), Prosecutor, International Criminal Court from the United Kingdom

== Production ==
Crossing Lines was co-commissioned by France's TF1 and Sony for its AXN network of channels. This is Tandem's first one-hour drama series, having previously produced miniseries, as well as its first project since being acquired by StudioCanal in 2012. The first season was filmed in Paris, Nice and Prague, with filming ending in February 2013. Locations in Prague were used for parts of Paris, Italy, the Netherlands, Berlin and Vienna. Audio post-production was done by SoundSquare in Prague while video post-production work was done by Universal Production Partners. Approximately €10 million was spent in the Czech Republic on the production of the first season.

Bernero said that the show would "feel familiar and help viewers find their orientation, but the European locations will make it feel fresh and very new". Parts of the third season were also filmed in Opatija, Croatia, at Hotel Imperial.

== Episodes ==
=== Series overview ===
Season	Episodes	Originally aired		DVD and Blu-ray release dates		
Season	Episodes	Season premiere	Season finale	Region 1	Region 2	Region 4
1	10	June 23, 2013	August 18, 2013	January 21, 2014	—N/a	—N/a
2	12	August 15, 2014	September 4, 2014	—N/a	—N/a	—N/a
3	12	September 30, 2015	December 4, 2015	—N/a	—N/a	—N/a

=== Season 1 (2013) ===
No. overall	No. in season	Title	Directed by	Written by	Original release date	US viewers (millions)
1	1	"Pilot — Part 1"	Daniel Percival	Edward Allen Bernero	June 23, 2013	4.37
Four women have been killed, their bodies left in wooded areas of parks in major European cities. ICC Agents, including Anne-Marie San and Sienna Pride, are joined by retired American police officer Carl Hickman (who moved to Europe after his hand was crippled by a fugitive), to find the killer. The coroner discovers wounds on the victim that hint at the killer toying with his intended prey. A shoe from the crime scene is traced to a store where the killer abducts Anne-Marie, while Hickman is out in the car taking care of a morphine fix for the pain in his hand. The killer is able to slip through a roadblock because his car has American Embassy plates.
2	2	"Pilot — Part 2"	Daniel Percival	Edward Allen Bernero	June 23, 2013	4.37
The team deduces that the killer was at the latest crime scene and identify him as Gerald Wilhoit (Eddie Jemison), from a security video of him purchasing a dog he later killed in the park. They also determine that he has taken Anne-Marie to a Berlin park. He wounds her and tells her to run, but she stands up to him, buying her team time to find their location. Hickman chases after him when Wilhoit mortally stabs Sienna. Hickman is unable to shoot him, due to his incapacity to load his gun's chamber with his wounded hand. Lead Agent Louis Daniel shoots him instead, and Hickman takes that gun to avoid an international incident. Last appearance of Sienna Pride.
3	3	"The Terminator"	Laurent Barès	Christoper Smith	June 30, 2013	3.71
As the ICC team recovers from Agent Pride's death, a millionaire real estate developer in Amsterdam is poisoned and his Van Gogh painting stolen. The team's research finds two other similar cases over the past year from other countries. At the victim's apartment, a forensic scan reveals the ingested poison to be Polonium-210, also known as "The Terminator". Image from security cameras show the woman who entered with the victim to be Irish national Nicole Ryan (Erin Richards). Hickman finds the (fake) Van Gogh painting. When a previous victim's Vermeer is traced to a warehouse, the team finds two of Ryan's cohorts. One of them mentions mysterious crime lord "The Russian", a man who had Ryan poison her victims to see if the polonium worked. The other gives up Ryan's next target in Prague. Agent Eva Vittoria poses as a server at an art gallery. She has a geiger counter in her earpiece that alerts her when she is near Ryan. The team surrounds Ryan as she is holding a glass of champagne. She reveals that her male victims seduced young women; she then drinks the poison. Meanwhile, ICC leader Michel Dorn talks with Louis' wife, ICC prosecutor Rebecca (Elsa Mollien), to learn more about what happened the night their son died from a car bomb.
4	4	"Long-Haul Predators"	Eric Valette	Oliver Hein-MacDonald	July 7, 2013	2.90
The team uncovers a murder ring involving European truck drivers. A mechanic involved disables family vehicles, force the parents to fight each other, with the orphaned children being cared for by the mechanic's wife. Agent Sebastian Berger works with his former partner Kathrin Eicholz (Florentine Lahme) who offers her own son to play a role in the bust, which Eva and Agent Tommy McConnell act as parents. Hickman and Louis notice a resemblance between the boy and Sebastian and ask if the boy is his, but do not receive an answer.
5	5	"Special Ops – Part 1"	Andy Wilson	Rachel Anthony	July 14, 2013	2.84
Hickman and Anne-Marie are on the French–Italian border, investigating Phillip Genovese, the person who crippled Hickman's hand. In Cannes, billionaire Lev Marianski's (Karel Roden) son, Maxim (Arthur Jacquin), is taken hostage, his security detail and girlfriend Laure (Fanny Krich) are shot and killed. Anne-Marie remembers a similar case in Florence a few months prior. Maxim's divorced parents arrive at the scene. Hickman notices Lev's nervousness and gets him to admit that a kidnapping insurance policy, which covers any ransom demands, was placed on his family. Lev also admits that Maxim had a tracer microchip implanted to get a discount on the policy. Sebastian traces the microchip to the local family villa. They find it, excised and bloody, sealed with a note mentioning future contact. The team sets up camp at the villa for any such contact. Eva is sent to Florence to check for connections between cases. Louis gets a call from Dorn, asking why the team is investigating his contact regarding Dimitrov, who is crime lord "The Russian". Louis realizes Lev is the contact, as the Marianksi financial records are being checked out and the abductors are Russian. Meanwhile, the kidnapper (Jana Pallaske) uses a video link to show Maxim to the parents and then demand €10 million in ten hours. Lev pleads for more time. The link is severed by an explosion at the villa.
6	6	"Special Ops – Part 2"	Andy Wilson	Rachel Anthony	July 21, 2013	2.83
The explosion was contained to the house's security room. The kidnapper's liaison (Nadine Warmuth) monitors the villa from a nearby security camera and is told to call Lev Marianski. Talking to the team over Lev's speakerphone, she mentions enough for Hickman to realize they are being watched. The team uses the local police station as a hub. The kidnappers enter the next stage of the plan by putting Maxim in an airtight container with a limited supply of oxygen running into it. In Florence, Eva meets with the only witness from the previous similar case, an art school's guidance counselor, Katya, who we know is the liaison. Katya cuts the meeting short and appears to be withholding information. Eva follows her to discover the video link between the kidnappers and the Marianskis. The two women fight and Katya is shot and killed. Louis gives the ransom money to a motorcyclist, while Tommy follows it in a helicopter. The team watches, via the video link that Eva keeps active, as the kidnappers prepare to set Maxim free. However, gunmen arrive and kill the kidnappers. Maxim remains locked away, his oxygen tanks depleting. After the cyclist is picked up but cannot help with details, Hickman questions Maxim's mother about the kidnapping. She confesses to it, out of hatred for Lev and overhearing Katya's previous plot, but doesn't know Maxim's location. Sebastian uses the IP address of the kidnappers' computer, along with images seen from the video link, to send Tommy to save Maxim just as he runs out of oxygen. Later, we learn that Hickman is living undercover as a janitor at a carnival operated by Genovese. At Hickman's trailer, Shari (Klára Issová) tells him that Genovese has left the area, but will return. They kiss.
7	7	"The Animals"	Philippe Haïm	Christopher Smith	July 28, 2013	2.97
Dorn asks Louis if the Marianski kidnapping had anything to do with Dimitrov being his source. Louis insists that only the ex-wife was involved. Louis asks about Hickman and Anne-Marie says he is on an errand. Hickman is at The Hague's bank to ask the manager, Mr. Stoke, about an account with the passcode "carnival." Hickman eyes some nervous customers and calls the office to request an open line. As he does this, a robbery ensues by people dressed in animal masks. They collect the hostages's cell phones, including Hickman's, which severs his line to the office. The bank manager is strapped with a bomb, shoved out the front door, and the bomb is detonated. Sebastian finds tunnels run all over the city from under the bank. Tommy discovers a personal connection. The team realizes the robbery was a cover to stage a prison break using the tunnels. All involved are eventually captured. When Louis asks Hickman about some drugs found on him by the robbers, he lies about his morphine and claims it is the painkiller Lidocaine. Dorn and Louis later discuss Rebecca, who is seen tossing her phone off a bridge when Louis calls her.
8	8	"Desperation & Desperados"	Daniel Percival	Edward Allen Bernero	August 11, 2013	2.51
In Italy, drugs and money are stolen from the Conti Cartage warehouse. The thieves commandeer Conti's daughter Angela (Matilda Lutz) and her car. Conti's men, pursuing the thieves, leave a trail of terror in public shootouts through Italy and into Slovenia. Sebastian and Tommy survey a Slovenian scene and deduce that there is a kidnap victim involved. While one of Angela's captors, Paulo (Christian Burruano), is tended to in a hospital, his brother Antonio (Allan Cappelli Goetz) tells her about her father taking his family's land in order to produce drugs rather than olive oil. Nicola Conti (Duccio Camerini) has never been charged for his crime ring. He is arrested after his men, now intent on killing both Angela and Antonio, are tracked into some woods. Eva helps Angela through the shock of her father's criminality and deaths of Paulo and Antonia, explaining that her own parents were killed for doing business with Conti. Meanwhile, Rebecca suggests to Louis they work together to catch and prosecute Dimitrov, then complete their divorce and get on with their lives.
9	9	"New Scars/Old Wounds – Part 1"	Hannu Salonen	Edward Allen Bernero	August 18, 2013	2.06
(Throughout the episode, the team is unable to contact Agent Anne-Marie.) Hickman is called by Dutch Inspector Seeger (Lara Rossi) to identify a body. Hickman believes it to be his missing girlfriend, Shari, but it turns out to be the bank manager from the earlier robbery ("The Animals"). Inspector Seeger arrests Hickman for the murder, having proof of his previous activity with the victim and having found an empty briefcase found behind his carnival trailer, thought to have contained €100,000 illegally taken from the bank. In the morgue, Tommy is allowed to look at the body, pointing out that the wounds could not have been made by Hickman, due to his crippled right hand. An imprint from a ring with the monogram "G" was also found in some wounds. Louis tells this to Hickman, who knows it belongs to Genovese (Kim Coates). Louis also tells Hickman that he knew of Hickman's past with Genovese and asks him not to become a vigilante in the search for Shari. Hickman quits the team, returns to the carnival and is lured to a funhouse. Inside, Genovese assaults him while admitting to killing the bank manager for stealing his money. He claims to have shot Shari in order to make it look like a murder-suicide and leaves Hickman handcuffed to her near the gun and a syringe. Meanwhile, Sebastian's computer and equipment has been hacked, for which he blames Eva's former employers at the Italian police. Dorn gets even closer to finding Dimitrov, but is ambushed. He calls Louis to say Dimitrov knows their plans. Louis rushes home to discover that Rebecca is missing from their ransacked apartment.
10	10	"New Scars/Old Wounds – Part 2"	Eric Valette	Edward Allen Bernero	August 18, 2013	2.06
(The team continues trying to contact Agent Anne-Marie.) Inspector Seeger and Tommy arrive at the carnival, freeing Hickman fighting off Genovese's henchman. Hickman gets into a gunfight with Genovese, ultimately wounding him. Both Shari and Genovese are taken to a hospital. Hickman apologizes to an unconscious Shari, then goes to Genovese's room, where he tells Seeger and Tommy about Genovese using the traveling carnival for child trafficking. On the way back from Italy, Sebastian and Eva are stopped on the road to allow a burned out car to be pulled from a ditch. Eva believes it to be Anne-Marie's car and calls to tell Tommy, who realizes that it is likely her burned body in the morgue beside the dead banker (from Part 1). Sebastian needs his computers to function and Eva admits it was her former colleagues who hacked him, after she went behind his back and told the Italians that Sebastian had been covertly accessing their computer records to research criminals the ICC team was pursuing. Her former colleagues remove the virus from his computers when he agrees to let them publicly release his most personal files, as punishment. In Paris, unable to find Louis and Rebecca, Dorn gets a phone call to meet with Dimitrov (Marcel Iureş), who tells him Rebecca was the intended target of the bomb that killed her and Louis' son, as she and Dorn were responsible for the ICC convicting Dimitrov's brother-in-law of war crimes, which Dimitrov reveals was revenge for the Budyonnovsk hospital hostage crisis—in which Dimitrov's wife and two daughters were killed. Dorn is given 24 hours to free the brother-in-law, or Rebecca and Louis will die. At the crash site, with his computers and forensic scanners operating again, Sebastian's equipment reveals footprints heading away from the crash, which they hope may be Anne-Marie's. Inspector Seeger's boss, revealing he is working for Genovese, overpowers Seeger and releases Genovese. Dorn calls the team together to find Rebecca and Louis, as he will never release a war criminal. Last appearance of Anne-Marie San.

=== Season 2 (2014) ===
No. overall	No. in season	Title	Directed by	Written by	UK internet release
11	1	"The Rescue"	Xavier Gens	Edward Allen Bernero	August 15, 2014
Set against the terrible loss of Anne Marie, one of their own, the team has only 24 hours to find and rescue Louis and Rebecca. Meanwhile, Dorn plays a dangerous game with Dimitrov.
12	2	"The Homecoming"	Michael Wenning	Edward Allen Bernero	August 15, 2014
Hickman's former New York partner, Amanda Andrews, is in the middle of a dangerous rescue of kidnapped young women. But, it's a trap set by Genovese - and he's back in New York. At the ICC, Dorn wrestles with the best way to break some terrible news to Rebecca.
13	3	"The Kill Zone"	Eric Valette	Edward Allen Bernero, Christopher Smith	August 15, 2014
A highly skilled sniper is killing people indiscriminately to bring attention to his political grudge. On the home front, Rebecca agrees to prosecute once again at the ICC and Arabela, the newest member of the team, starts work.
14	4	"Everybody Will Know"	Philip John	Oliver Hein-Macdonald	August 15, 2014
"Everybody will know" - a threatening text message sent repeatedly to specific teenagers along with incriminating videos. The goal - to prompt the recipients to commit suicide. So far, three out of three have died, one more to go. At the ICC, Dorn puts Sebastian under internal investigation when he discovers that Sebastian's long and very expensive gambling habit has been leaked to the press.
15	5	"Home Is Where the Heart Is"	Ben Bolt	Edward Allen Bernero, Corinne Marrinan	August 15, 2014
A series of vicious home invasions in Belgium and Germany have escalated in violence. In Belgium, an entire family has been brutally murdered. Going deep undercover for the first time, Sebastian will join the gang on their next job.
16	6	"Freedom"	Laurent Barès	Clive Bradley	August 15, 2014
Amanda brings Genovese to the Hague to stand trial but he seems smug, as if he knows something they don't know. He says he has invaluable information about a very big player in the human trafficking business - for which he wants to bargain for an early release from prison. As Eva goes undercover to try to get information on the human trafficking gang, Hickman and Amanda work a sting on Genovese.
17	7	"The Velvet Glove"	Kerric Macdonald	Edward Allen Bernero, Corinne Marrinan	August 15, 2014
Miles Lennon contacts Dorn and the team for help in investigating a potential network of black widows who arrange meetings and accidents to gain 'control' over their elderly husbands.
18	8	"Family Ties"	Diarmuid Lawrence	Edward Allen Bernero	August 15, 2014
Lennon calls the team for help investigating a new string of tainted drugs released in London, but the investigation is complicated due to Lennon's certainty that Tommy's family were involved in the drugs' distribution.
19	9	"Truth and Consequences"	Stephen Woolfenden	Oliver Hein-Macdonald	August 15, 2014
An attempted kidnapping of a movie star friend of Dorn's exposes a complex connection to a strange cult and a road accident two years ago.
20	10	"The Long Way Home"	Xavier Gens	Jason Bernero	August 15, 2014
When Eva discovers a body washed up on shore during a visit home, a journalist reveals that he has discovered evidence of a serial killer who drowns his victims and leaves a strange shell in their throats.
21	11	"The Team — Part 1"	Bill Eagles	Erika Harrison	August 15, 2014
Eva thought she saw her father, whom she long believed to be dead, in Spain. The rest of the team investigates two elaborately planned prison escapes
22	12	"The Team — Part 2"	Xavier Gens	Edward Allen Bernero	August 15, 2014
The team, at first baffled by the gang's tactics, begins to put the pieces together. Realizing the prison psychiatrist is in on the breakout, Hickman alerts the team. As the mystery unfolds, tragedy for the team also follows. Last appearance of: Eva Vittoria, Tommy McConnell, Carlton "Carl" Hickman, Louis Daniel

=== Season 3 (2015) ===
No. overall	No. in season	Title	Directed by	Written by	Original release date
23	1	"Redux"	Niall MacCormick	Frank Spotnitz	September 30, 2015
Six months later, one of Dorn's top prosecutors vanishes and he must reactivate the ICC team to find her. Kidnapping expert Marco (Goran Visnjic) and Carine (Elizabeth Mitchell), a skilled investigator, are new team members joining Sebastian and Arabela.
24	2	"Whistleblower"	Niall MacCormick	Wendy Battles	September 30, 2015
New evidence leads the team to re-evaluate their prime suspect and pay close attention to Sophie's undercover informant.
25	3	"Dragon"	Ashley Pearce	Francesca Gardiner	October 3, 2015
When tragedy befalls a private European school, the cross-borders unit uncovers evidence of a much more complicated truth.
26	4	"In Loco Parentis"	Sue Tully	Spencer Hudnut & Francesca Gardiner	October 13, 2015
All is not as it appears when the unit travels to Italy to investigate the assassination of a well-connected anti-Mafia court official.
27	5	"Recoil"	Sue Tully	James Moran	October 16, 2015
When a known murderer restarts his killing spree, a twist of events leads the team to investigate a group espousing social justice.
28	6	"Executioner"	Niall MacCormick	Nicholas Meyer	October 23, 2015
A known criminal is attacked but dies from a contagious disease rather than his wounds leading the team to track down everyone in contact with him.
29	7	"Lost and Found"	Ashley Pearce	Corinne Marrinan	October 30, 2015
When the ICC take on the case of a young girl believed to be a victim of human trafficking, clues lead to a dark and disturbing revelation.
30	8	"Heat"	Kerric MacDonald	Ben Harris	November 6, 2015
Carine clashes with Dorn's former colleague when he's brought in on a new case: a cargo of highly radioactive material stolen from a nuclear plant.
31	9	"Expose"	Kerric MacDonald	Frank Spotnitz & Jimmy Dowdall	November 13, 2015
A journalist known for lifestyle puff pieces is on the verge of breaking an important investigative story to Dorn's unit, but ends up a murder victim.
32	10	"Enemy of the People"	Sue Tully	Jason Sutton & Ben Harris	November 20, 2015
An investigation into the deaths of officials working on a hydroelectric project raises suspicion about a conspiracy and exposes a contractor.
33	11	"Penalty"	Michael Wenning	Timothy Prager	November 27, 2015
What starts as an alleged race-based hate crime directed at soccer players leads to suspicion about eh obvious evidence, suspects and motives.
34	12	"Obscura"	Ashley Pearce	Wendy Battles	December 4, 2015
A retired Russian assassin seeks vengeance against leaders of a fanatic right-wing political party and the ICC team must protect her next victim.

== Release and broadcast ==
The series premiered on June 9, 2013, at the screening for the Opening Ceremonies of the 53rd edition of the Festival de Télévision de Monte-Carlo, the first time the festival opened with a television series.

Its first television broadcast was in Italy on June 14, 2013, on the public broadcaster's channel Rai 2. Crossing Lines was premiered in the United States on NBC on June 23, 2013. In the United Kingdom, the series was released on the LoveFilm platform on October 25, 2013.

The show was renewed for a 12-episode second season by TF1, and was released on Amazon Video in the UK on August 15, 2014, with all seasons available on the platform as of 2019. NBC did not broadcast the show after the first season. Canada's CBC aired second-season episodes during late-night hours.

Netflix carried the series' first two seasons, and announced the debut of season three on February 19, 2015. On February 20, 2015, the show was renewed for a 12-episode third season, which began airing on September 15, 2015.

== Reception ==
Tom Conroy of Media Life Magazine found the European flavour of the show, seen in such things as travelling by train to various cities, to be a refreshing change from the norm of American shows. He felt that Donald Sutherland was cast purely for the name-recognition factor and that he was given some lines in which he philosophically talks to pigeons as a means of justifying the cost of casting him. Overall, Conroy found it an "unimaginative procedural" that, despite its title, "generally colors within the lines". David Wiegand of the San Francisco Chronicle also found the location to be what sets Crossing Lines apart. He felt the presence of Donald Sutherland was a benefit to the show. Joanne Ostrow of Heritage Newspapers felt the show to be a "contrivance for foreign sales more than a serious drama".

Crossing Lines has been criticised as misrepresenting the International Criminal Court's nature and purpose, which, in reality, only has jurisdiction over crimes against humanity, war crimes and genocide. The International Criminal Court lacks an organization comparable to the special crime unit, and has no police force of its own. Kevin Jon Heller, Associate Professor & Reader in international criminal law at the University of Melbourne, noted the show creates unacceptable misconceptions about the court's power and the way it operates, which depends on states consenting to its jurisdiction through ratification of the Rome Statute and co-operating with the court to provide resources required to perform investigations and prosecutions.

Without all the shooting, Crossing Lines is more closely related to the special crimes investigations unit of the first International Criminal Tribunal at The Hague in the Netherlands. These crime investigators from all over the world do indeed operate across national jurisdictional lines in connection with major crimes, such as murder, rape, torture and kidnapping that occurred in the territory of the former Yugoslavia. John Cencich's The Devil's Garden: A War Crimes Investigator's Story (Potomac Books, Washington, D.C.) demonstrates how police investigators from Germany, France, Belgium, the United Kingdom, Italy, the United States, and many others worked pursuant to the authority of the United Nations Security Council, without relying on national police forces, to investigate and bring to justice some of the world's worst criminals.

== See also ==
- Criminal Minds: Beyond Borders—an American crime television series featuring an international-based detective squad
- FBI: International—an American crime television series featuring a Europe-based detective squad
