= Donovan's Echo =

- Donovan's Echo theatrical poster
- Directed by: Jim Cliffe
- Written by: Jim Cliffe; Melodie Krieger
- Produced by: Trent Carlson; Andria Spring
- Starring: Danny Glover; Bruce Greenwood
- Cinematography: Robert Ashmann
- Edited by: Mark Shearer
- Music by: Terry Frewer
- Distributed by: Union Pictures
- Release dates: September 18, 2011 (Cinefest Sudbury); February 22, 2012 (Canada)
- Running time: 91 minutes
- Country: Canada
- Language: English

Donovan's Echo is a 2011 Canadian supernatural suspense film directed by Jim Cliffe and co-written by Jim Cliffe and Melodie Krieger, starring Danny Glover and Bruce Greenwood.

== Plot ==
Donovan Matheson is a man trapped in the past. Once an esteemed physicist, Donovan worked on the Manhattan Project. In the years that followed, his regret spilled into his personal life, when he became obsessed with finding a theory for cold fusion to help benefit the world. Donovan's obsession led to the loss of his wife and child in an accident he believes he could have prevented.

After a thirty-year absence, Donovan returns to his small town, where he finds himself caught up in events that echo the same tragedy. He witnessed a fatal car accident and somehow foreknew it would happen. He then walks out of a store and saves a girl who is standing under a scaffold from being struck by a falling power tool. Plagued by déjà vu, Donovan is convinced his young neighbor, Maggie, and her mother, Sarah, are doomed to die on the anniversary of his family's deaths. Struggling to unlock the pattern, Donovan attempts to decipher a puzzle that he believes ties the past to the present, and offers a path to redemption. Donovan tries to convince his brother-in-law, police Sergeant Finnley, but when his facts do not add up, Donovan's sanity is questioned. Is he losing his mind, or running out of time?

== Cast ==
- Danny Glover as Donovan Matheson
- Bruce Greenwood as Finnley Boyd
- Natasha Calis as Maggie
- Sonja Bennett as Sarah
- David Lewis as Kit
- Ian Tracey as Ray

== Production ==
=== Development ===
Following the success of his Comic-Con award-winning short film, Tomorrow's Memoir, co-writer/director Jim Cliffe began conceiving an idea for a feature-length screenplay, inspired by a moment of déjà vu. Taking a cue from co-writing teams such as husband and wife duo Peter Jackson and Fran Walsh, Jim enlisted the help of his writer girlfriend (now wife), Melodie Krieger, to flesh out what would become Donovan's Echo. From the beginning, the two imagined an older protagonist with a tragic past and a lifetime of regret, who was now experiencing a phenomenon he could not comprehend. Donovan's tragic background included the idea that he worked on the Manhattan Project as a theorist. "I thought it might be interesting to have a character with a set of tools to try and dissect what is happening around him" explains Cliffe. "That was a pretty momentous moment in our history that hasn't really been covered a lot in contemporary film."

In late 2007, the first draft of Donovan's Echo placed quarter-finalist in the Academy of Motion Picture Arts and Sciences' Nicholl Fellowships in Screenwriting. Out of 3,000 international screenplays, the script also won the Bronze prize for Drama in the PAGE International Screenwriting Awards. While the script gained Hollywood interest, finding producers willing to take a chance on a first-time director proved challenging. Jim approached producer Trent Carlson, with whom he had worked before as an artist. Trent agreed to produce and brought on producers Andria Spring and Mary Anne Waterhouse to begin a phase of development and rewrites; refining the story and bringing it more to a production ready point.

Another boon to development was from a former co-worker and friend of Jim's, Lance Priebe, whom Cliffe had met in the late 1990s when they were both artists. Priebe had gone on to develop Club Penguin, a virtual game for children, that in 2007 was sold to Disney. "We both were let go from the same company at the same time. He wanted to create games, and I wanted to create films," explained Cliffe. Lance and his wife Kim came on board as executive producers and helped finance the film alongside Telefilm and other Canadian production sources, bringing in a modest budget of around $3M. "It magically came together. We were able to get all our financing and production done in Canada, as well as distribution with a company out of Toronto," said Cliffe.

=== Casting ===
A casting agent put a list of names together for potential "Donovan's". One name in particular stood out to the filmmakers. That actor was Danny Glover, best known for his roles in The Color Purple and the Lethal Weapon film franchise. "We could so easily see him play into this world," said Cliffe, who after hearing that Glover was attached, was soon able to cast Canadian born Bruce Greenwood. Along the way they also found the rest of their cast in Natasha Calis, Sonja Bennett, David Lewis, and Ian Tracey.

=== Filming ===
With casting in place, Donovan's Echo went into production in late 2010. The tight 20-day shoot included multiple locations around Vancouver, Maple Ridge, Fort Langley and Pitt Meadows, British Columbia, Canada, with the bridge scene being shot near Harrison River. The shoot also included various time periods and stunts. With a background in illustration and animation, Cliffe storyboarded the movie as well as some pre-viz animatics. But as a first-time feature director, Cliffe soon realized that his shots and sequences were a little too ambitious for such a tight schedule. As a result, he condensed his vision to suit a smaller film.

== Release ==
Distributed by Union Pictures, Donovan's Echo premiered in Sudbury, Ontario's Cinéfest in September 2011, and was the opening film at the Calgary International Film Festival that same month where Bruce Greenwood also attended. The film also screened at the Edmonton, Victoria, Pan-African, and Vancouver Film Festivals, where VIFF referred to it as "a film that wrings hope out of mystery, love out of grief and miracles out of science". In February 2012, after premiering at the TIFF Bell Light box theatre, Donovan's Echo had a limited theatrical release across Canada. The movie was released on DVD, Blu-ray and digital download in Canada in September 2012 by Anchor Bay Entertainment, and went out to the U.S. in May 2013.

== Reception ==
Donovan's Echo received several positive reviews. The Toronto Film Scene Magazine wrote, "With such an interesting mystery, great performances and themes of hope and acceptance, Donovan's Echo is a great debut for Jim Cliffe." In The Toronto Examiner review, David Voigt said the movie was, "A thoughtful well told drama with a little bit of science fiction edge." Similarly, Press+1 noted that the movie was, "A good mind puzzle with a moralistic center, one that would have made Rod Serling nod with approval." Danny Glover's performance was also noted in several reviews. The online Criticize This wrote, "Glover is at the top of his game in this performance, as is Bruce Greenwood... These two actors help shape Donovan's Echo into a solid film worth watching."

However, not all critics were as enthusiastic. Although marketed as a thriller, the movie contains many dramatic elements, humour, and a strong emotional core, which did not resonate with some reviewers.

== See also ==
- Déjà vu
- Ouroboros
