= PAGE International Screenwriting Awards =

The PAGE International Screenwriting Awards is an annual writing competition founded in 2003 with the stated mission to discover and promote up-and-coming screenwriters from around the world. The contest is judged by Hollywood producers, development executives and representatives who are looking for new projects and new clients. Each year in October, they present 31 awards and more than $50,000 in cash and prizes to the scripts they think are the most creative, well-written, and marketable. Entries are categorized by genre, with winners in each of the 10 sub-competitions vying for a Grand Prize.

After winning the PAGE Awards competition, many screenwriters have signed with agents and managers, obtained TV writing assignments, signed option agreements on their scripts and/or had their films produced.

Some of the PAGE winners who have gone on to build careers in the film and television industry:

- Bill Dubuque: Ozark, The Accountant
- Steven Canals: Pose, Dead of Summer
- Brooke Roberts: The Flash, NCIS: New Orleans
- John Scott 3: Maggie, Parable X
- Jim Cliffe & Melodie Krieger: Donovan's Echo
- Marc Conklin: Memorial Day
- Laurie Weltz: About Scout, The Night Swimmer
- Janet Lin: Bones, The Night Shift
- Sang Kyu Kim: 24: Live Another Day, The Walking Dead
- VJ Boyd: Justified, The Player
- Davah Avena: Kevin (Probably) Saves the World, Grand Hotel
- Simeon Goulden: Spy, Secret Diary of a Call Girl

== Grand Prize Winners ==
- 2026: A Subject of Interest by Pedro Eiras
- 2025: The New Boyfriend by Zach Roe
- 2024: Mal by Jack Azadi
- 2023: The Stratford Wife by Sarah E. Sinclair
- 2022: Thirstygirl by Alexandra Qin
- 2021: iCon by A. J. Bermudez
- 2020: Mother Wild by Claire Tailyour
- 2019: Odyssey by Michael Kogge
- 2018: Tundra Kill by Kevin Bachar
- 2017: Jane by Kendell Courtney Klein
- 2016: Changelings by Diane Hanks
- 2015: Immaculate by Gareth Smith
- 2014: Carnival by Matias Caruso
- 2013: Leavenworth by Brooke Roberts
- 2012: The Unraveling by Tobin Addington
- 2011: Escape by Pat White
- 2010: Supercat! by R. Scott Shields
- 2009: Progeny by Mehul Desai
- 2008: Honor Bound by Mike Amato
- 2007: Solomon's Whale by John Arends
- 2006: Warmonger, Inc. by Scott LaCagnin
- 2005: X-Mas Files by Larry Postel
- 2004: Monkey River by Laurie Weltz & Jay C. Key

In addition, each year Gold, Silver and Bronze Prizes are presented in the following genre categories:

- Action/Adventure
- Comedy
- Drama
- Family film
- Historical film
- Science fiction
- Thriller/Horror
- Short film
- TV Drama pilot
- TV Comedy pilot
