= Stargate Studios =

Visual effects studio

- Company type: Private
- Industry: Visual effects
- Founded: 1989
- Headquarters: South Pasadena, California, United States
- Website: stargatestudios.net

Stargate Studios is an American post-production studio founded in 1989 by cinematographer and special visual effects supervisor Sam Nicholson.

It is a production company offering visual effects and production services to the film and television industry with studios in Los Angeles, Toronto, Vancouver, Atlanta, Malta, London, Cologne, Dubai, and Mexico City.

== Stargate Digital filmography ==
=== Currently in production ===
- The 45 Rules of Divorce
- The Black Phone
- Burn Your Maps
- Fear the Walking Dead
- Girlfriends' Guide to Divorce
- Good Trouble
- Grey's Anatomy
- House of Lies
- Hustlers
- HBO's Run
- Motive
- Ray Donovan
- The Resident
- Pure Genius
- Solos
- Station 19
- The Walking Dead (2011, 2012, 2014, 2015 Primetime Emmy Nomination for Outstanding Special Visual Effects)
- Telenovela
- Our Flag Means Death

=== Completed projects ===
- 12 Monkeys
- 24
- About a Boy
- An American Carol
- A Night in Old Mexico
- "Atlas Shrugged: Part 1"
- "Atlas Shrugged: Who Is John Galt?"
- Bates Motel
- Betty in NY
- Bobby
- Carpoolers
- Charlie's Angels: Full Throttle
- Coke
- CSI: NY
- Comanche Moon (2008 Primetime Emmy Nomination for Outstanding Special Visual Effects)
- Degrassi: The Next Generation
- Dirty Sexy Money
- The Divide
- Defying Gravity (2010 Visual Effects Society Nomination for Outstanding Special Visual Effects for a Broadcast Series)
- The Dead Zone
- Doctor Who
- Eli Stone
- The Event
- ER
- Fairly Legal
- Gilmore Girls
- The Glades
- Gracepoint
- Gettysburg
- Greek
- Hannibal
- Happy Town
- How It's Made: Dream Cars
- Haven (2016 Canadian Screen Awards Nomination for Best Visual Effects)
- Hemlock Grove
- Heroes (2009 Primetime Emmy Award for Outstanding Special Visual Effects)
- Heroes Reborn
- High School Musical 3
- Home Alone: The Holiday Heist
- Into the Grizzly Maze
- Into the West
- In Plain Sight
- The Killing
- Knight Rider
- Kyle XY
- Las Vegas
- Mad Men
- Matador
- Mob City
- Monk
- Nightmares and Dreamscapes: From the Stories of Stephen King (2007 Primetime Emmy Award for Outstanding Special Visual Effects)
- Nikita
- NCIS
- NCIS
- October Road
- The Office
- Parenthood
- Parks and Recreation
- Phantom
- Pan Am
- Private Practice
- Rush
- Revenge
- Reaper
- Samurai Girl
- Star Trek
- Star Trek II: The Wrath of Khan
- Saving Grace
- Spartacus
- Sliders
- Reaper
- Touch
- Trauma
- Ugly Betty
- Champeta: El ritmo de la tierra
