= Defying Gravity (TV series) =

2009 multi-national TV series

- Defying Gravity intertitle
- Genre: Drama; Science fiction
- Created by: James D. Parriott
- Starring: Ron Livingston; Malik Yoba; Andrew Airlie; Paula Garces; Florentine Lahme; Karen LeBlanc; Ty Olsson; Zahf Paroo; Eyal Podell; Maxim Roy; Dylan Taylor; Peter Howitt; Christina Cox; Laura Harris
- Composer: Shawn Pierce
- Countries of origin: United States; Canada; United Kingdom; Germany
- Original language: English
- No. of seasons: 1
- No. of episodes: 13

Production
- Executive producers: Michael Edelstein; James Parriott; Brian Hamilton; Michael Chechik
- Producer: Ron French
- Production locations: Vancouver, British Columbia, Canada
- Cinematography: Stephen McNutt
- Production companies: Parriott/Edelstein Productions; Omni Film Productions; Fox Television Studios

Original release
- Network: ABC (USA); BBC Two & BBC HD (UK); CTV (CAN); ProSieben (Germany)
- Release: August 2 – October 23, 2009

Defying Gravity is a multi-nationally produced science fiction television series which first aired on August 2, 2009 on ABC and CTV and was canceled in October 2009. Set in the year 2052, the series follows eight astronauts (four women and four men) from four countries on a six-year space mission through the Solar System, during which they are monitored from Earth via a real-time communication system. The series was pitched to networks as "Grey's Anatomy in space". Thirteen episodes of the series were produced before it was cancelled, only eight of which were shown on ABC, though the full run was shown in other countries or online.

== Premise ==
The program follows the adventures of eight astronauts on board the international spacecraft Antares, the next ambitious crewed space mission after the Mars landing. The lives of the astronauts are being constantly recorded and broadcast back to Earth both as part of an ongoing documentary and as part of mission monitoring. Despite a libido-suppressing device worn by each crew member, referred to as "HALO" for "Hormone Activated Libido Oppressors", romantic entanglements develop among some crew members. Further complicating their lives is a mysterious storage pod that contains something referred to as Beta, which is exerting an influence on their mission.

== Characters ==
=== On Antares ===
- Evram Mintz (Eyal Podell) is the ship's doctor and psychiatrist. He's Claire Dereux's boyfriend. Mintz is from Israel, where he served in the IDF.
- Jen Crane (Christina Cox) is a biologist, she's married to Rollie Crane and had a past relationship with Ted Shaw. She's from Canada. (Note: "CTV.ca - Defying Gravity Bios - Jen Crane". CTV.ca - Defying Gravity.) (Note: "About the show - Character Bios - Jen". ABC.com - Defying Gravity.)
- Maddux Donner (Ron Livingston) is the chief engineer. Sharon Lewis was his lover before she died during a mission on Mars, he currently has a casual sexual relationship with Nadia Schilling, and has an awkward relation with Zoe Barnes. He's from Iowa, USA.
- Nadia Schilling (Florentine Lahme) is a pilot. She has a casual sexual relationship with Maddux Donner. Nadia is from Germany. Series creator James Parriott later stated that the intention was to reveal later in the series that Nadia was actually intersex, and the effects of the beta object were changing her into the male she could have been.
- Paula Morales (Paula Garcés) is the payload specialist, lander pilot and is responsible for an on-board documentary for kids. She is from Brownsville, Texas. (Note: "About the show - Character Bios - Paula". ABC.com - Defying Gravity.)
- Steve Wassenfelder (Dylan Taylor) is a theoretical physicist and a porn connoisseur. He is from the United States.
- Ted Shaw (Malik Yoba) is the Antares commander. He is married to Eve Weller and had a relationship with Jen Crane in the past. He's from the United States. (Note: "About the show - Character Bios - Ted". ABC.com - Defying Gravity.)
- Zoe Barnes (Laura Harris) is a geologist. She had a one-night stand with Maddux Donner who is unaware that it resulted in an aborted pregnancy. She's from Canada, but also votes for the next American president in the episode Deja Vu. (Note: "About the show - Character Bios - Zoe". ABC.com - Defying Gravity.)

=== On Earth ===
- Ajay Sharma (Zahf Paroo) was the original flight engineer but after a heart problem caused by Beta he was reinstated to mission control. He's from Mumbai, India. (Note: "About the show - Character Bios - Ajay". ABC.com - Defying Gravity.)
- Claire Dereux (Maxim Roy) is the flight surgeon and Evram Mintz's girlfriend. She is from Montreal, Canada.
- Eve Weller-Shaw (Karen LeBlanc) works alongside Goss. She works for the Bertram Corporation and was in charge of crew selection. Eve is married to Ted Shaw and is from New Orleans, Louisiana. (Note: "About the show - Character Bios - Eve". ABC.com - Defying Gravity.)
- Mike Goss (Andrew Airlie) is the mission control flight director. He was on the Mars mission. (Note: "About the show - Character Bios - Mike". ABC.com - Defying Gravity.)
- Rollie Crane (Ty Olsson) is the former Antares commander and currently works in mission control. He's married to Jen Crane. He is from the United States
- Arnel Poe (William C. Vaughan) works in mission control. He lost his leg during his training for qualification for the Antares mission. He is from the United States.
- Trevor Williams (Peter Howitt) is a journalist from the United Kingdom. He suspects that ISO isn't telling the truth about the Antares mission and tries to find out.

=== On Mars ===
- Sharon Lewis (Lara Gilchrist) was left behind together with Walker during a previous Mars mission. She was Donner's former lover.
- Jeff Walker (Rick Ravanello) was left behind on Mars with Lewis.

== Development ==
The project was inspired by the BBC fictional documentary miniseries Space Odyssey: Voyage to the Planets, broadcast on BBC One in 2004. The show was co-produced by the BBC, Fox Television Studios, and Omni Film Productions, in association with Canadian broadcasters CTV Television Network and SPACE, as well as German broadcaster ProSieben.

Thirteen episodes were initially ordered, and filming began on January 19, 2009, in Vancouver, British Columbia, Canada, North America, lasting six months. CGI effects were handled by Stargate Studios, in collaboration with set designer Stephen Geaghan.

== Episodes ==
No.	Title	Directed by	Written by	Original release date
1	"Pilot"	David Straiton	James D. Parriott	August 2, 2009 (ABC/CTV)
Four male and four female astronauts prepare for a six-year mission aboard the spaceship Antares.
2	"Natural Selection" "Law of Natural Selection"	Peter Howitt	James D. Parriott	August 2, 2009 (ABC/CTV)
The Antares begins its mission to explore the planets in the Solar System. During flashback scenes from five years in the past, we learn that Steve is not able to swim and should have been disqualified from the Antares mission. However, his inclusion was a requirement set by Eve Weller. We also learn about Zoe's and Maddux's one-night stand. In the present, Zoe gets in the specially designed Venus suit to test it for leaks. A system error ejects her and the leak causes her to lose pressure in space. Steve's otherwise disgusting idea saves Zoe's life and gains him respect from others.
3	"Threshold"	Peter Howitt	Sheri Elwood	August 9, 2009 (ABC/CTV)
A mysterious force aboard the Antares begins to have a profound effect on the astronauts' biological compositions and personality traits.
4	"H2IK" "H2IK (Hell If I Know)"	Fred Gerber	Brett Conrad	August 16, 2009 (ABC/CTV)
An unknown malfunction sends the Antares into chaos as the ship's operating systems are thrown offline, causing the failure of vital systems such as power, gravity, and heating.
5	"Rubicon"	Marcie Ulin	Meredith Lavender & Marcie Ulin	August 23, 2009 (ABC/CTV)
As the Antares approaches the point of no return, the crew must deal with the upcoming crossing of the critical boundary where return to Earth is no longer an option.
6	"Bacon"	Marcie Ulin	Meredith Lavender	August 28, 2009 (CTV)
Drawing closer to the orbit of Venus, some members of the Antares crew struggle with guilt and experience vivid repercussions of past actions, while a serious accident puts the life of a teammate in danger, uniting everyone in the desperate endeavor to save her.
7	"Fear"	Jeff Woolnough	Chris Provenzano	September 4, 2009 (CTV)
It's Halloween aboard the Antares and the forces of darkness are revealed in more ways than one, as feverish hallucinations jeopardize the lives of the crew just as they are about to embark on a promotional event for which the whole world is waiting.
8	"Love, Honor, Obey" (Note: As of September 14, 2009 this episode was the last scheduled airing of the show on ABC.)	Fred Gerber	Susan Nirah Jaffee	September 11, 2009 (CTV)
An impending solar flare threatens the crew of the Antares with dangerous radiation, while the strange force in Pod 4 finally sends out a siren call that proves utterly irresistible.
9	"Eve Ate the Apple" (Note: As of October 2, 2009 this episode was the last scheduled airing of the show on CTV.)	Peter Howitt	Blythe Robe	September 18, 2009 (CTV)
The crew of the Antares learns about Pod 4 and the real reason for their mission to Venus.
10	"Deja Vu" (Note: CTV originally had this episode scheduled for September 25, 2009 but started season 3 of Flashpoint instead.)	Michael Rohl	Sheri Elwood	October 2, 2009 (SPACE)
It's election day but the crew aboard the Antares is still processing the news about their real mission on Venus.
11	"Solitary"	David Straiton	Meredith Lavender & Marcie Ulin	October 9, 2009 (SPACE)
In the final hours before the landing on Venus, crew members of the Antares confront the loneliness and isolation of space.
12	"Venus"	Sturla Gunnarsson	James D. Parriott	October 16, 2009 (SPACE)
It's the day of the Venus landing, a historic and dangerous event likely to alter the lives of everyone involved.
13	"Kiss"	Sturla Gunnarsson	James D. Parriott	October 23, 2009 (SPACE)
After landing on the burning surface of Venus, Zoe walks toward a sound only she can hear, drawn by her destiny into almost certain destruction.

== Broadcast ==
On June 30, 2009, ABC announced that it had ordered the program for a summer 2009 broadcast in the United States. The show began on October 21, 2009 on BBC Two and BBC HD in the United Kingdom, and has aired on both CTV and SPACE in Canada, and is set to air on ProSieben in Germany. All 13 episodes aired in November / December 2009 on Arena TV in Australia.

CTV moved the scheduled airing of the show from Sunday to Friday nights on August 26, 2009, and speculation began about the possibility of the show being canceled. On September 14, 2009, online sources noted ABC's apparent cancellation of the series, with most having reported the eighth episode as the "series finale", while others reported it as the "season finale". The show's publicist, Nicole Marostica, issued a statement on September 14, 2009 that ABC is not in fact canceling the show but that management is deciding on a time slot to air the remaining 5 episodes of season 1.

CTV aired episode 9, Eve Ate the Apple on September 18, 2009, but did not have Defying Gravity on its schedule for the following week. The remaining four episodes were aired on SPACE, which is only available in Canada. On October 22, 2009, TV Squad reported that the sets for Defying Gravity had been destroyed and that the series had been canceled. On October 29, 2009, creator James Parriott revealed to CliqueClack TV how the series would have continued, had the show gone past its first season. Parriott explained that he has the first three seasons plotted out in a show "bible", along with how it would ultimately end. Also reported was that the remaining episodes that did not air in the U.S. would not be shown on television, but would appear later on Hulu and iTunes. The series was released to DVD on January 19, 2010. All online content regarding the show was removed from the ABC website as of November 18, 2009, and is no longer available on Hulu.

== DVD releases ==
Set details				Special features
Country	United States, Canada	United Kingdom	Australia	Bonus featurettes: "Mission Accomplished: A Look at Defying Gravity"; Five photo slide shows; 29 deleted scenes
# episodes	13	13	—N/a	Bonus featurettes: "Mission Accomplished: A Look at Defying Gravity"; Five photo slide shows; 29 deleted scenes
Aspect ratio	1.78:1	1.85:1	—N/a	Bonus featurettes: "Mission Accomplished: A Look at Defying Gravity"; Five photo slide shows; 29 deleted scenes
Running time	578 minutes	538 minutes	—N/a	Bonus featurettes: "Mission Accomplished: A Look at Defying Gravity"; Five photo slide shows; 29 deleted scenes
Audio	Dolby Digital 5.1	—N/a	—N/a	Bonus featurettes: "Mission Accomplished: A Look at Defying Gravity"; Five photo slide shows; 29 deleted scenes
Subtitles	English, Spanish, French	—N/a	—N/a	Bonus featurettes: "Mission Accomplished: A Look at Defying Gravity"; Five photo slide shows; 29 deleted scenes
# of discs	4	4	—N/a	Bonus featurettes: "Mission Accomplished: A Look at Defying Gravity"; Five photo slide shows; 29 deleted scenes
Region	1 (NTSC)	2 (PAL)	—N/a	Bonus featurettes: "Mission Accomplished: A Look at Defying Gravity"; Five photo slide shows; 29 deleted scenes
Rating	Not Rated	15	—N/a	Bonus featurettes: "Mission Accomplished: A Look at Defying Gravity"; Five photo slide shows; 29 deleted scenes
Release date	January 19, 2010	February 25, 2013	—N/a	Bonus featurettes: "Mission Accomplished: A Look at Defying Gravity"; Five photo slide shows; 29 deleted scenes

== Ratings ==
=== US Nielsen ratings ===
#	Episode	US air date	Rating	Share	Rating/share (18-49)	Viewers (millions)	Rank (week)
1	"Pilot"	August 2, 2009	2.4	4	1.1/3	3.83	21
2	"Natural Selection"	August 2, 2009	2.3	4	1.0/3	3.56	21
3	"Threshold"	August 9, 2009	1.8	3	1.0/2	2.81	28
4	"H2IK"	August 16, 2009	1.7	3	0.8/2	2.59	34
5	"Rubicon"	August 23, 2009	1.8	3	0.8/2	2.66	33
6	"Bacon"	August 30, 2009	1.7	3	0.9/2	2.53	31
7	"Fear"	September 6, 2009	1.7	4	0.6/2	2.16	29
8	"Love, Honor, Obey"	September 13, 2009	1.6	3	0.8/2	2.53	39

=== Canadian BBM ratings ===
#	Episode	Canadian air date	Viewers (million)	Rank (week)
1; 2	"Pilot" "Natural Selection"	August 2, 2009 (CTV)	0.783	20
3	"Threshold"	August 9, 2009 (CTV)	—N/a	—N/a
4	"H2IK"	August 16, 2009 (CTV)	0.573	30
5	"Rubicon"	August 23, 2009 (CTV)	—N/a	—N/a
6	"Bacon"	August 28, 2009 (CTV)	—N/a	—N/a
7	"Fear"	September 4, 2009 (CTV)	—N/a	—N/a
8	"Love, Honor, Obey"	September 11, 2009 (CTV)	—N/a	—N/a
9	"Eve Ate the Apple"	September 18, 2009 (CTV)	—N/a	—N/a
10	"Deja Vu"	October 2, 2009 (Space)	—N/a	—N/a
11	"Solitary"	October 9, 2009 (Space)	—N/a	—N/a
12	"Venus"	October 16, 2009 (Space)	—N/a	—N/a
13	"Kiss"	October 23, 2009 (Space)	—N/a	—N/a

=== UK BARB ratings ===
#	Episode	UK air date	Audience share (%)	Viewers (million)
1	"Pilot"	October 21, 2009	7.7	1.72
2	"Law of Natural Selection"	October 21, 2009	7.2	1.44
3	"Threshold"	October 29, 2009	3.5	0.79
4	"H2IK (Hell If I Know)"	November 5, 2009	3.3	0.76
5	"Rubicon"	November 12, 2009	2.8	0.67
6	"Bacon"	November 14, 2009	—N/a	—N/a
7	"Fear"	November 21, 2009	—N/a	—N/a
8	"Love, Honor, Obey"	November 28, 2009	—N/a	—N/a
9	"Eve Ate the Apple"	December 12, 2009	—N/a	—N/a
10	"Deja Vu"	December 19, 2009	—N/a	—N/a
11	"Solitary"	December 20, 2009	—N/a	—N/a
12	"Venus"	December 21, 2009	—N/a	—N/a
13	"Kiss"	December 22, 2009	—N/a	—N/a
