= Natasha Calis =

Canadian actress (born 1999)

- Born: 27 March 1999 (age 27); Vancouver, British Columbia, Canada
- Occupations: Film, Television, and Voice actress
- Years active: 2006–present

Natasha Calis (born 27 March 1999) is a Canadian actress known best for her role in the 2012 supernatural horror film The Possession, where she plays the role of Emily Brenek, a possessed girl, as well as her roles as Claire McDeere in the 2012 Canadian-American television drama series The Firm and Hayley Roberts in the medical drama SkyMed (2022-present).

== Career ==
Calis started acting professionally at age 7 and made her television debut with her role as Annie Cooper in the 2007 television film Christmas Caper.

She is best known for playing Emily Brenek in the film The Possession and Maryann in the film The Harvest. She was also in the NBC television series The Firm. She has also played in the films Donovan's Echo, Daydream Nation and Sharp as Marbles, a 2008 comedy, as well as a role as voice actress in the animated film Barbie Presents: Thumbelina.

On television, she had an important role in the series The Firm, a role as voice-actress in Dinosaur Train and roles in the miniseries Impact and Alice. She also played in the television films Christmas Caper, Held Hostage and Gone, as well as When Calls the Heart, a 2013 movie pilot of the television series. She also starred alongside Samantha Morton with the role of Maryann in the film Can't come out to play, which was named The Harvest in the US.

== Filmography ==
Film
Year	Title	Role	Notes
2008	Sharp as Marbles	Abbey	
2009	Barbie Presents: Thumbelina	Emma	
2010	Daydream Nation	Lily Goldberg	
2011	Donovan's Echo	Maggie Walgrave	
2012	The Possession	Emily "Em" Brenek	
2013	The Harvest	Maryann	Also known as Can't Come Out to Play
2013	Advice from a Caterpillar	Alice Liddell	Short film
2016	Barbie & Her Sisters in a Puppy Chase	Lindsay	Voice
2017	Heartbeat	Nina Johnson	
2018	Gong Ju	Nicole	Short film
2026	Sick Puppy	Charlie	Film
TBA	The Lotus Flower	Isabelle	Pre-production

Television
Year	Title	Role	Notes
2007	Christmas Caper	Annie Cooper	TV movie
2009	Impact	Sadie Kittner	Miniseries
2009	Held Hostage	Breea Estey	TV movie
2009	Alice	Looking Glass Girl	Miniseries
2010-2019	Dinosaur Train	Leslie / Maisie Mosasaurus / Leslie Lesothosaurus	Voice; 3 episodes
2011	Gone	Emily Kettering	TV movie
2012	The Firm	Claire McDeere	Main role 19 episodes
2013	When Calls the Heart	Perlie Leverly	TV movie
2015	Just the Way You Are	Chloe	TV movie
2015	Ties That Bind	Rachel McLean	Also known as Detective McLean in the United Kingdom; Main role; 10 episodes
2018	Supernatural	Lora	Season 14 episode 3: "The Scar"
2019	The Good Doctor	Jess Barnes	Season 2 episode 16: "Believe"
2020-2021	Nurses	Ashley Collins	Main role; 20 episodes
2022–present	SkyMed	Hayley Roberts	Main role; 27 episodes
