= Cell 213 =

2011 Canadian horror film

- Directed by: Stephen T. Kay
- Written by: Maninder Chana
- Produced by: Hartley Gorenstein; Hassain Zaidi
- Starring: Eric Balfour; Michael Rooker; Bruce Greenwood
- Cinematography: Luc Montpellier
- Edited by: Tad Seaborn
- Music by: Jonathan Goldsmith
- Distributed by: Access Motion Pictures
- Release date: June 10, 2011
- Running time: 109 minutes
- Country: Canada
- Language: English

Cell 213 is a 2011 Canadian horror film starring Bruce Greenwood, Eric Balfour, and Michael Rooker.

== Plot ==
Lawyer Michael Grey (Balfour) is summoned to an isolated prison to defend a murderer. When the murderer violently kills himself during their interview, all eyes are on Grey and he is soon sentenced in the same prison, South River State Penitentiary. Forced to deal with a sadistic guard (Rooker) and an enigmatic Warden (Greenwood) and locked in Cell 213, the same as the murderer who put him in prison, God and the devil battle for Grey's soul.

== Cast ==
- Eric Balfour as Michael Grey
- Bruce Greenwood as the Warden
- Michael Rooker as Ray Clement
- Deborah Valente as Audrey Davis
- Conrad Coates as Frank
- Viv Leacock as Six
- Tamara Gorski as Lynn
- Rob Ramsay as Rory

== Production ==
Filming took place in fall of 2008 in Ontario. Jonathan Goldsmith recorded the film's music.

== Reception ==
On review aggregator Rotten Tomatoes, the film holds an approval rating of 17% based on six reviews, with an average rating of 3.5/10.
