= Held Hostage =

- Based on: Held Hostage: The True Story of a Mother and Daughter's Kidnapping by Michelle Renee Ramskill-Estey as Michelle Renee
- Teleplay by: James Kearns; Maria Nation
- Directed by: Grant Harvay
- Starring: Julie Benz; Brendan Penny; Sonja Bennett; Natasha Calis
- Country of origin: United States
- Original language: English

Production
- Running time: 86 minutes

Original release
- Network: Lifetime
- Release: July 19, 2009

Held Hostage is a Lifetime Movie starring Julie Benz that aired on July 19, 2009. It is based on the true story of Michelle Renee Ramskill-Estey who also wrote the novel. Hal Foxton Beckett was nominated for a Leo Award for the music featured in the movie.

== Plot ==
Michelle Ramskill-Estey (Julie Benz), a single mother, is kidnapped by three masked men and held hostage until she is forced to rob a bank which is the only option she has to save her only child's life while they are both wired to explode.

== Actual events ==
In November 2000, Michelle Ramskill-Estey and her 7-year-old daughter Breea Ramskill returned to their Needles, California home, only to find 4 men, armed with guns. They strapped fake bombs to the two and ordered Ramskill-Estey to drive to a Bank of America location, where she worked, and give them the $360,000 in the vault. Three people were charged, two men and one woman. The two men were convicted and the woman was acquitted of all charges. The story was shown on I Survived... and 48 Hours.

== Cast ==
- Julie Benz as Michelle Ramskill-Estey
- Brendan Penny as Chris Clark/Money One
- Sonja Bennett as Sandi Clark
- Natasha Calis as Breea Ramskill
- Michelle Harrison as Rose

== Other media ==
The case was reconstructed for an episode of the Japanese television show World Extreme Mystery, which aired in 2019.
