= Jim Cliffe =

Canadian animator and film director

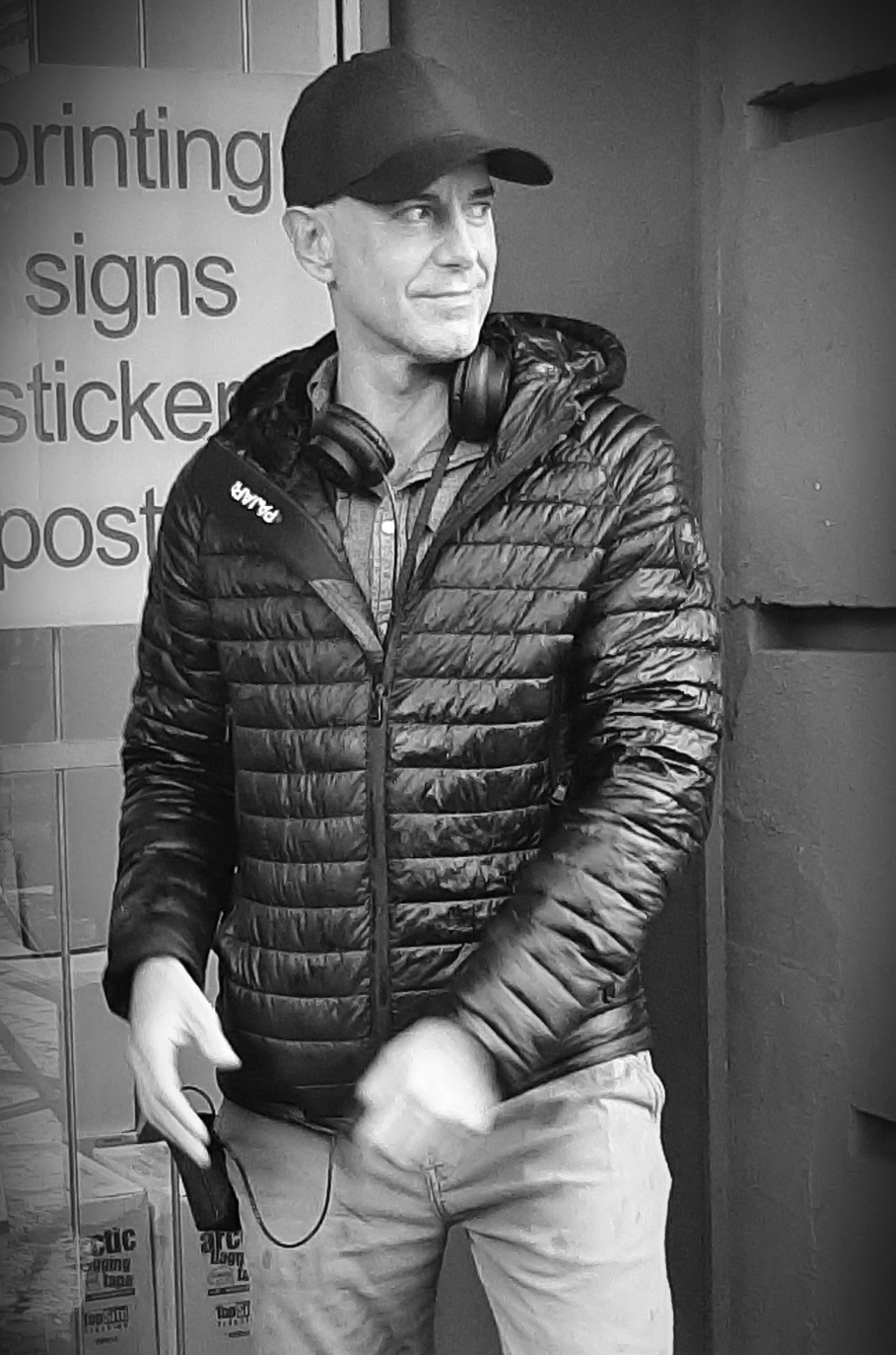
Jim Cliffe directing "The Loving Spoonful" (2022).

Jim Cliffe is a Canadian writer, director and artist, with a professional background in illustration and animation. His first feature, Donovan's Echo, was released in 2012.

== Early life ==
Cliffe was born in British Columbia, Canada. He showed strong artistic skills at an early age, and developed his first newspaper published comic strip with his brother Jason at the age of 11. As a kid, Jim's love of movies were often a creative driving force with his art. He also experimented with animation, and made video shorts with his friends, mimicking stunts and sequences from some of his favorite movies.

== Career ==
Professionally, Jim's career has primarily been in the arts - illustration, design and animation - as the idea of becoming a movie director didn't really seem like a tangible goal to him.

In 2005, Jim's first professional short film noir Tomorrow's Memoir gained attention after winning 'Best Comics-Oriented Film' at San Diego Comic-Con. At 27-minutes in length, Tomorrow's Memoir screened at several festivals, and would also go on to become an online hit within the comic community following its launch on the now retired ifilm. The short film also garnered rave reviews from Film Threat, DC Comics, Moviehole, and others.

In 2007, Jim's first feature-length screenplay, 'Donovan’s Echo' (co-written by Cliffe and his wife Melodie Krieger) won the Bronze Award in the PAGE International Screenwriting Awards and made quarter-finalist in the Academy of Motion Picture Arts and Sciences' Nicholl Fellowships in Screenwriting.

Donovan's Echo went into production in late 2010 on a modest budget of "around $3M", with Cliffe attached as director. Starring Danny Glover and Bruce Greenwood, the movie premiered in Sudbury, Ontario's Cinéfest in September 2011, and was the opening film at the Calgary International Film Festival that same month. Donovan's Echo had a limited theatrical release across Canada in February, 2012. The Toronto Film Scene's William Brownridge wrote, "With such an interesting mystery, great performances, and themes of hope and acceptance, Donovan's Echo is a great debut for Jim Cliffe". Similarly, David Voigt of The Toronto Examiner added in his review, "For a debut feature, Cliffe shows real skill as a solid storyteller with an eye for casting as well."

Donovan's Echo was released on DVD, Blu-ray and digital download in Canada in September 2012 by Anchor Bay Entertainment, and will be coming to the U.S. in May 2013. Jim has also directed for television, including the rom-com movie "The Loving Spoonful" (2022), "Rancher 101" (2022), and the upcoming "Been There All Along".

Cliffe's second feature film as write/director is in development with Minds Eye Entertainment, inspired by the events of Roswell and Project Blue Book.
