= Ties That Bind (TV series) =

2015 Canadian–American drama TV series on UP network

- Genre: Crime drama
- Created by: Sheryl J. Anderson
- Starring: Kelli Williams; Jonathan Scarfe; Dion Johnstone; Rhys Matthew Bond; Natasha Calis; Mitchell Kummen; Matreya Scarrwener
- Countries of origin: Canada; United States
- Original language: English
- No. of seasons: 1
- No. of episodes: 10

Production
- Running time: 42 minutes

Original release
- Network: Up TV
- Release: August 12 – October 14, 2015

Ties That Bind is a Canadian–American drama series that premiered on the UP network on August 12, 2015. The first season consisted of 10 episodes. It was cancelled after the first season. In the UK it was screened as Detective McLean.

The series stars Kelli Williams as experienced police officer Allison McLean who balances life with her job, husband Matt (Jonathan Scarfe), and teenage children Jeff (Mitchell Kummen) and Rachel (Natasha Calis). Allison's life changes when her older brother Tim Olson (Luke Perry) is arrested and sent to prison. She takes in his teenage children from fraternal twins—her nephew and niece Cameron (Rhys Matthew Bond) and Mariah (Matreya Scarrwener). Allison and her family must adjust to their new situation and band together.

== Cast ==
- Kelli Williams as Allison McLean, a police detective
- Jonathan Scarfe as Matt McLean, Allison's husband
- Dion Johnstone as Devin Stewart, Allison's partner
- Rhys Matthew Bond as Cameron Olson, Tim's teenage son and Allison & Matt's nephew
- Natasha Calis as Rachel McLean, Allison & Matt's teenage daughter
- Mitchell Kummen as Jeff McLean, Allison & Matt's teenage son
- Matreya Scarrwener as Mariah Olson, Tim's teenage daughter and Allison & Matt's niece
- Lucia Walters as Ellen Wilkes (episodes 7)
- Alison Araya as Victoria Velasquez (episodes 2)
- Aaron Craven as Pete Lee (episodes 5)
- Luke Perry as Tim Olson, Allison's older brother and Cameron & Mariah's father (episodes 5)
- Meredith McGeachie as Jackie (episodes 4)
- Grayson Gabriel as Jordon (episode 1)
- Tammy Gillis as Carla Martin (episode 1)
- Jason Priestley as Vernon Keeler (episode 1)
- Jared Ager-Foster as Chris (episodes 2)
- C. Thomas Howell as Mr. Witherspoon (episode 1)
- Kirsten Prout as Chelsea Boyd (episode 1)
- Lochlyn Munro as McGee (episode 1)

== Episodes ==
No.	Title	Directed by	Written by	Original release date	U.S viewers (millions)
1	"Pilot"	Sean McNamara	Sheryl J. Anderson	August 12, 2015	0.449
Police detective Allison McLean takes in her nephew and niece, Cameron and Mariah, after their father is sentenced to prison for two years. Allison and her husband, Matt, try to make the best of the new situation, which also includes their own teenagers Jeff and Rachel. Cameron's anger against Allison gets the best of him, as he blames her for his father going to prison. Meanwhile, Allison and her partner, Devin, work on a case involving a pregnant teen and her boyfriend who have just robbed a pharmacy.
2	"A Fresh Start"	Monika Mitchell	Sheryl J. Anderson	August 19, 2015	0.200
Allison and partner Devin investigate the murder of a restaurant owner who hired ex-convicts, one of whom Allison has helped in the past. Meanwhile, Mariah and Cameron try to fit in at their new school with some unwanted help from Jeff and Rachel.
3	"Ghosts"	Michael Scott	Sheryl J. Anderson & Peter Hume	August 26, 2015	0.180
Allison comes face to face with the man who shot her; Matt suspects Cameron of theft.
4	"It Doesn't Show"	Monkia Mitchell	Sheryl J. Anderson & Jennica Harper	September 2, 2015	0.166
Allison and Matt discover a dark secret in their friends marriage; Mariah's poetry worries her teacher.
5	"United Front"	Sean McNamara	Sheryl J. Anderson & Dean Batali	September 9, 2015	0.133
The complicated relationship between two brothers clouds an investigation for Allison and Devin; when Matt takes Allison on a romantic date, Cameron and Mariah Break House Rules challenging Rachel and Jeff.
6	"Controlled Substance"	Steven R. Monroe	Sheryl J. Anderson & Katherine Collins	September 16, 2015	0.107
Allison and Devin investigate the breakdown of a star student at the high school; the kids deal with the social fallout of having Allison on campus.
7	"The Whole Picture"	Steven R. Monroe	Sheryl J. Anderson & Peter Hume	September 23, 2015	0.140
Allison has an altercation with a famous woman's soccer player and is accused of brutality.
8	"Paying For It"	Michael Scott	Sheryl J. Anderson & John Cooksey	September 30, 2015	0.073
One of Matt's employees gets caught up in a slavery ring and turns to Allison for help; Cameron and Mariah plan to visit Tim in jail for his birthday
9	"Legacy"	Steven R. Monroe	Sheryl J. Anderson & Katherine Collins	October 7, 2015	0.090
Allison and Devin investigate the death of a high - powered CEO, Jackie comes home from rehab.
10	"Protect and Serve"	Steven R. Monroe	Sheryl J. Anderson & Peter Hume	October 14, 2015	0.135
Allison and Devin uncover the shocking truth at the heart of a turf war; Allison and Matt take the family to visit Tim in prison.
