= Bruce Greenwood =

Canadian actor and musician (born 1956)

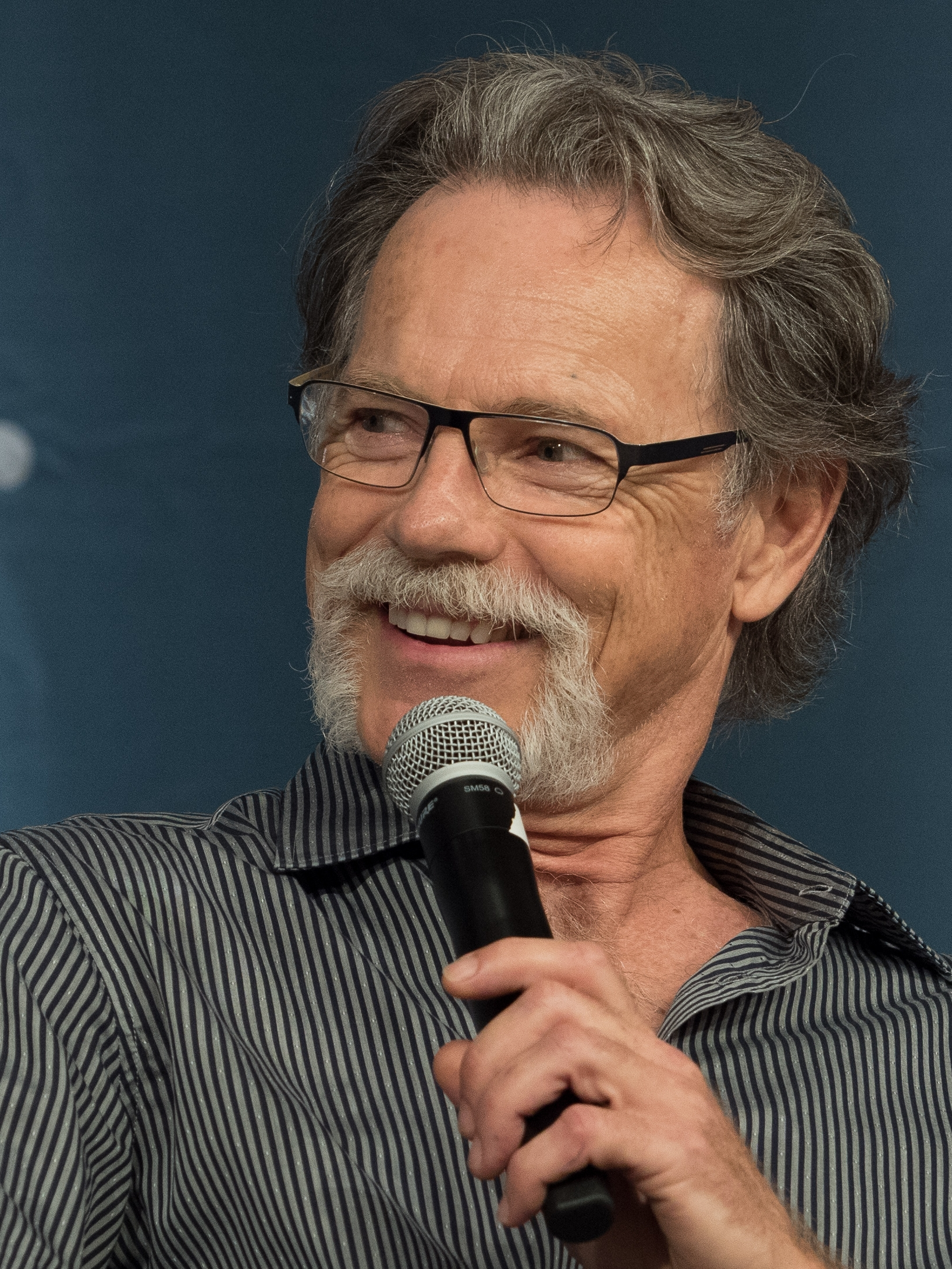
- Greenwood in 2016
- Born: Stuart Bruce Greenwood; August 12, 1956 (age 70); Rouyn-Noranda, Quebec, Canada
- Occupations: Actor; producer
- Years active: 1977–present
- Spouse: Susan Devlin (m. 1985)
- Children: 1

Stuart Bruce Greenwood (born August 12, 1956) is a Canadian actor and producer. He has starred in five films by Canadian filmmaker Atom Egoyan and has been nominated for three Canadian Screen Awards, once for Best Actor for Elephant Song (2014) and twice for Best Supporting Actor, for The Sweet Hereafter (1997) and Being Julia (2004).

Greenwood is known for frequently portraying the President of the United States, beginning with his role as John F. Kennedy in Thirteen Days (2000), for which he won the Satellite Award for Best Supporting Actor – Motion Picture; he later played fictional presidents in National Treasure: Book of Secrets (2007) and Kingsman: The Golden Circle (2017). He also portrayed Captain Christopher Pike in J. J. Abrams's Star Trek (2009) and Star Trek Into Darkness (2013) and Gerald Burlingame in Gerald's Game (2017). He has appeared in other supporting roles in such films as Double Jeopardy (1999), I, Robot (2004), Capote (2005), Déjà Vu (2006), I'm Not There (2007), Meek's Cutoff (2010), Flight (2012), The Place Beyond the Pines (2012), The Post (2017), and Doctor Sleep (2019).

On television, Greenwood's regular series roles include Dr. Seth Griffin in St. Elsewhere (1986–1988), Thomas Veil in Nowhere Man (1995–1996), Mitch Yost in John from Cincinnati (2007) and Dr. Randolph Bell in The Resident (2018–2023). He has had recurring roles on television series such as Knots Landing (1991–1992) and Mad Men (2015). He also appeared as Gil Garcetti in the miniseries The People v. O. J. Simpson: American Crime Story (2016) and as the patriarch Roderick Usher in The Fall of the House of Usher (2023). He has voiced Bruce Wayne / Batman in the films Batman: Under the Red Hood (2010), Batman: Gotham by Gaslight (2018) and Batman: Death in the Family (2020), and the television series Young Justice (2010–2019).

== Early life ==
Greenwood was born in Rouyn-Noranda, Quebec, Canada, the son of Mary Sylvia (née Ledingham) and Hugh John Greenwood. His mother worked as a nurse in an extended care unit. His father was born in Vancouver, and was a geophysicist and professor who taught at Princeton University.

== Career ==
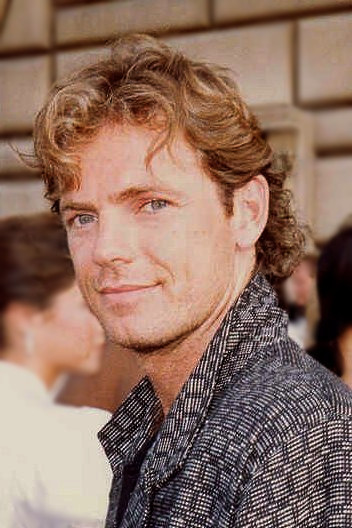
Greenwood at the 39th Primetime Emmy Awards, 1987

Greenwood is known in the United States for his appearances in Star Trek; I, Robot; Double Jeopardy; The Core; Thirteen Days as president John F. Kennedy; Capote as Jack Dunphy, Truman Capote's lover; Eight Below as Professor Davis McClaren; and Firehouse Dog. He is also known for his role in the video game Call of Duty: Modern Warfare 3 as the voice of Overlord.

He had prominent roles in the award-winning Atom Egoyan films Exotica, The Sweet Hereafter, and Ararat. He appeared in the 1980s teen cult film The Malibu Bikini Shop and starred in Mee-Shee: The Water Giant. He played a role in The World's Fastest Indian and also featured in the Bob Dylan biographical film I'm Not There. He appeared in Dinner for Schmucks as the cruel executive who hosts a dinner for "idiots".

On television, Greenwood has appeared on St. Elsewhere (Dr. Seth Griffin, 1986–1988) and Knots Landing (Pierce Lawton, 1991–92), and starred in the UPN series Nowhere Man (Thomas Veil, 1995–96). He also guest-starred in one episode of the popular Canadian show Road to Avonlea, for which he won a Gemini Award for "Best Guest Performance in a Series by an Actor". In 1998, he starred with Linda Hamilton, Lynn Whitfield, and Roger Guenveur Smith as a "laborer with a strong patriarchal sense" in the television film The Color of Courage, which Variety called "excellent".

On June 10, 2007, HBO's John from Cincinnati premiered, starring Greenwood. He also appears as the President of the United States in National Treasure: Book of Secrets. He played Beach Boys drummer Dennis Wilson in Summer Dreams: Story of the Beach Boys. In 2009, he worked with Australian director Bruce Beresford, playing the part of Ben Stevenson (artistic director of Houston Ballet), in the critically acclaimed film Mao's Last Dancer. He voiced Bruce Wayne / Batman in the animated film Batman: Under the Red Hood, the animated series Young Justice, and the animated short film Batman: Death in the Family.

He played the lead role in the horror thriller Cell 213. He was the lead for the Steven Spielberg–produced 2012 ABC series The River, and reprised his role as Admiral Christopher Pike for J. J. Abrams' Star Trek Into Darkness. In 2015, he had a recurring role in the last season of Mad Men as Richard Burghoff, a romantic interest for Joan Harris (Christina Hendricks).

== Personal life ==
Greenwood is married to Susan Devlin. They live in the Pacific Palisades neighborhood, within Los Angeles, California.

== Filmography ==
=== Film ===
Year	Title	Role	Director	Notes
1979	Bear Island	Tommy, Technician	Don Sharp	
1982	First Blood	National Guardsman	Ted Kotcheff	
1986	The Malibu Bikini Shop	Todd	David Wechter	
1986	The Climb	Hermann Buhl	Donald Shebib	
1989	Wild Orchid	Jerome McFarland	Zalman King	
1989	Another Chance	John Ripley	Jesse Vint	
1991	Servants of Twilight	Detective Charlie Harrison	Jeffrey Obrow	
1992	Passenger 57	Stuart Ramsey	Kevin Hooks	
1994	Exotica	Francis Brown	Atom Egoyan	
1994	Paint Cans	Vittorio Musso	Paul Donovan	
1995	Dream Man	Tom	René Bonnière	
1997	Fathers' Day	Bob Andrews	Ivan Reitman	
1997	The Sweet Hereafter	Billy Ansel	Atom Egoyan	Nominated—Genie Award for Best Performance by an Actor in a Supporting Role
1998	Thick as Thieves	Bo	Scott Sanders	
1998	Disturbing Behavior	Dr. Edgar Caldicott	David Nutter	
1999	Double Jeopardy	Nick Parsons / Simon Ryder / Jonathan Devereaux	Bruce Beresford	Nominated—Blockbuster Entertainment Award for Favorite Supporting Actor – Suspense
1999	The Lost Son	Alex Friedman	Chris Menges	
2000	Here on Earth	Sheriff Earl Cavanaugh	Mark Piznarski	
2000	Cord	Jack	Sidney J. Furie	
2000	Rules of Engagement	US National Security Advisor Bill Sokal	William Friedkin	
2000	Thirteen Days	President John F. Kennedy	Roger Donaldson	Satellite Award for Best Supporting Actor – Motion Picture
2002	Ararat	Martin Harcourt / Clarence Ussher	Atom Egoyan	Nominated—Vancouver Film Critics Circle Award for Best Supporting Actor in a Canadian Film
2002	Swept Away	Tony Leighton	Guy Ritchie	
2002	Below	Lieutenant Brice	David Twohy	
2003	The Core	Commander Robert Iverson	Jon Amiel	
2003	Hollywood Homicide	Lieutenant Bernard 'Bennie' Macko	Ron Shelton	
2004	I, Robot	Lawrence Robertson	Alex Proyas	
2004	The Republic of Love	Tom Avery	Deepa Mehta	Also executive producer
2004	Being Julia	Lord Charles	István Szabó	Genie Award for Best Performance by an Actor in a Supporting Role; Nominated—Vancouver Film Critics Circle Award for Best Supporting Actor in a Canadian Film
2005	Racing Stripes	Nolan Walsh	Frederik Du Chau	
2005	Mee-Shee: The Water Giant	Sean Cambell	John Henderson	
2005	The World's Fastest Indian	Jerry	Roger Donaldson	
2005	Capote	Jack Dunphy	Bennett Miller	Nominated—SAG Award for Outstanding Performance by a Cast in a Motion Picture
2006	Eight Below	Davis McClaren	Frank Marshall	
2006	Deja Vu	FBI Special Agent Jack McCready	Tony Scott	
2007	Firehouse Dog	Connor Fahey	Todd Holland	
2007	I'm Not There	Keenan Jones / Garrett	Todd Haynes	Independent Spirit Robert Altman Award; Nominated—Boston Society of Film Critics Award for Best Cast
2007	National Treasure: Book of Secrets	President of the United States	Jon Turteltaub	
2008	Cyborg Soldier	Simon Hart	John Stead	
2009	Star Trek	Captain Christopher Pike	J. J. Abrams	Boston Society of Film Critics Award for Best Cast; Nominated—Broadcast Film Critics Association Award for Best Cast; Nominated—Washington D.C. Area Film Critics Association Award for Best Ensemble
2009	Mao's Last Dancer	Ben Stevenson	Bruce Beresford	
2010	Batman: Under the Red Hood	Bruce Wayne / Batman	Brandon Vietti	Voice; direct-to-video
2010	Meek's Cutoff	Stephen Meeks	Kelly Reichardt	Nominated—Village Voice Film Poll Award for Best Supporting Actor
2010	Barney's Version	Blair	Richard J. Lewis	
2010	Dinner for Schmucks	Lance Fender	Jay Roach	
2011	Cell 213	The Warden	Stephen Kay	
2011	For Greater Glory	Ambassador Dwight Morrow	Dean Wright	
2011	Super 8	Cooper	J. J. Abrams	Motion-captured performance
2011	Donovan's Echo	Sergeant Finnley Boyd	Jim Cliffe	Also executive producer
2012	Flight	Charlie Anderson	Robert Zemeckis	
2012	The Place Beyond the Pines	District Attorney Bill Killcullen	Derek Cianfrance	
2013	And Now a Word From Our Sponsor	Adan Kundle	Zack Bernbaum	
2013	Star Trek Into Darkness	Admiral Christopher Pike	J. J. Abrams	
2013	Devil's Knot	Judge David Burnett	Atom Egoyan	
2014	Endless Love	Hugh Butterfield	Shana Feste	
2014	WildLike	Rene Bartlett	Frank Hall Green	Naperville Independent Film Festival Award for Best Actor
2014	The Captive	Vince	Atom Egoyan	
2014	Elephant Song	Dr. Toby Green	Charles Binamé	Nominated—Canadian Screen Award for Best Actor; Nominated—Vancouver Film Critics Circle Award for Best Supporting Actor in a Canadian Film
2015	Good Kill	Lieutenant Colonel Jack Johns	Andrew Niccol	
2015	Rehearsal	Carl Bessai	Carl Bessai	
2015	Truth	Andrew Heyward	James Vanderbilt	
2015	Fathers and Daughters	William	Gabriele Muccino	
2015	Bob's Broken Sleigh	Fishface	Jay Surridge	Voice
2016	Spectral	General Orland	Nic Mathieu	
2016	Gold	Mark Hancock	Stephen Gaghan	
2017	Mark Felt: The Man Who Brought Down the White House	Sandy Smith	Peter Landesman	
2017	Kodachrome	Dean Ryder	Mark Raso	
2017	Kingsman: The Golden Circle	President of the United States	Matthew Vaughn	
2017	Gerald's Game	Gerald Burlingame	Mike Flanagan	
2017	The Post	Robert McNamara	Steven Spielberg	
2018	Batman: Gotham by Gaslight	Bruce Wayne / Batman	Sam Liu	Voice, direct-to-video
2018	Sorry for Your Loss	Jeff	Collin Friesen	Nominated—Canadian Comedy Award for Best Performance in a Feature
2019	Doctor Sleep	Dr. John Dalton	Mike Flanagan	
2019	Lie Exposed	Frank	Jerry Ciccoritti	
2020	Batman: Death in the Family	Bruce Wayne / Batman	Brandon Vietti	Voice, direct-to-video
2024	The Fabulous Four	Ted	Jocelyn Moorhouse	
2024	The Invisibles	Carl	Andrew Currie	

=== Television ===
Year	Title	Role	Notes
1980	Huckleberry Finn and His Friends	Bob Grangerford	3 episodes
1983	The Hitchhiker	Jeff Boder	1 episode
1983–1984	Space Carrier Blue Noah	Colin Collins	Voice; English-language dub; 18 episodes
1984	Legmen	Jack Gage	6 episodes
1984	Jessie	Detective Roy Moss	2 episodes
1985	Peyton Place: The Next Generation	Dana Harrington	Television film
1985	Striker's Mountain	Paul Striker	Television film
1986–1988	St. Elsewhere	Dr. Seth Griffin	Main cast; Seasons 5–6
1987	Matlock	Mitchel Gordon	Episode: "The Billionaire"
1987	Jake and the Fatman	Carson Warfield	Episode: "Fatal Attraction"
1988	In the Line of Duty: The F.B.I. Murders	FBI Special Agent Jerry Dove	Television film
1989	Twist of Fate	Daniel Grossman	2 episodes
1990	Summer Dreams: The Story of the Beach Boys	Dennis Wilson	Television film
1990	The Little Kidnappers	Willem Hooft	Television film Nominated—Gemini Award for Best Supporting Actor in a Miniseries or Dramatic Special
1991–1992	Knots Landing	Pierce Lawton	22 episodes
1991	Veronica Clare	Lieutenant Gil Reed	2 episodes
1993	Adrift	Nick Terrio	Television film
1993	Woman on the Run: The Lawrencia Bembenek Story	Fred Schultz	Television film
1994	Hardball	Dave Logan	9 episodes
1994	Heart of a Child	Fred Schouten	Television film
1994	Treacherous Beauties	Jason Hollister	Television film
1994	Road to Avonlea	Caleb Stokes	Episode: "Stranger in the Night"; Gemini Award for Best Guest Performance in a Regular Series by an Actor
1994	The Companion	Geoffrey	Television film
1995	Naomi & Wynonna: Love Can Build a Bridge	Larry Strickland	Television film
1995	Mixed Blessings	Andy Douglas	Television film
1995–1996	Nowhere Man	Thomas Veil	25 episodes
1997	The Absolute Truth	Jake Slaughter	Television film
1997–1998	The Larry Sanders Show	Roger Bingham	3 episodes
1997–1998	Sleepwalkers	Dr. Nathan Bradford	9 episodes
1999	The Soul Collector	Zacariah	Television film
2001	Haven	Myles Billingsley	Television film Nominated—Gemini Award for Best Supporting Actor in a Miniseries or Dramatic Special
2002	The Magnificent Ambersons	Eugene Morgan	Television film
2004	Meltdown	Agent Tom Shea	Television film
2004	The Life	Arnie	Television film
2004	The Riverman	Robert D. Keppel	Television film
2005	Saving Milly	Morton Kondracke	Television film
2006	Class of the Titans	Chiron	Voice; 14 episodes
2006	The Mermaid Chair	Hugh Sullivan	Television film
2007	John from Cincinnati	Mitch Yost	9 episodes
2008	The Summit	Richard Adderly	Miniseries; Nominated—Gemini Award for Best Actor in a Miniseries or Dramatic Special
2009	A Dog Named Christmas	George McCray	Television film
2010–2019	Young Justice	Bruce Wayne / Batman, Wotan, Pieter Cross, Eduardo Dorado Sr., Rumaan Harjavti, Viktor Markov, Matthew Malone, Epsilon Leader, Patrol Leader	Voice; 29 episodes
2012	The River	Dr. Emmet Cole	8 episodes
2013	The Challenger Disaster	General Donald Kutyna	Television film
2013	Westside	Gordy Nance	Unsold TV pilot
2015	Mad Men	Richard Burghoff	4 episodes
2015	Wet Hot American Summer: First Day of Camp	Bill Martinson	Episode: "Electro/City"
2016	The People v. O. J. Simpson: American Crime Story	Gil Garcetti	Main cast
2016	American Dad!	U.S. Navy Captain	Voice; Episode: "Daesong Heavy Industries II: Return to Innocence"
2017	Dirty Dancing	Dr. Jake Houseman	Television film
2018–2023	The Resident	Dr. Randolph Bell	Main cast
2018	The Haunting of Hill House	Ghost	Episode: "The Bent-Neck Lady"; Uncredited appearance
2019	Jett	Mr. Carlyle	2 episodes
2020	I Know This Much Is True	Dr. Hume	Main cast
2023	The Fall of the House of Usher	Roderick Usher	Main cast
2024	Cross	Mr. Herman	
2025	Dark Winds	Tom Spenser	Recurring Character Season 3

=== Video games ===
Year	Title	Voice role
2011	Call of Duty: Modern Warfare 3	Overlord
2013	Young Justice: Legacy	Bruce Wayne / Batman

== Awards and nominations ==
Year	Association	Category	Nominated work	Result
1992	Gemini Awards	Best Performance by an Actor in a Supporting Role	The Little Kidnappers	Nominated
1995	Gemini Awards	Best Guest Performance in a Series by an Actor	Road to Avonlea	Won
1997	Genie Awards	Best Performance by an Actor in a Leading Role	The Sweet Hereafter	Nominated
2000	Blockbuster Entertainment Awards	Favorite Supporting Actor – Suspense	Double Jeopardy	Nominated
2001	Gemini Awards	Best Performance by an Actor in a Featured Supporting Role in a Dramatic Program or Mini-Series	Haven	Nominated
2001	Satellite Awards	Best Supporting Actor – Motion Picture	Thirteen Days	Won
2003	Vancouver Film Critics Circle	Best Supporting Actor in a Canadian Film	Ararat	Nominated
2005	Vancouver Film Critics Circle	Best Supporting Actor in a Canadian Film	Being Julia	Nominated
2005	Genie Awards	Best Performance by an Actor in a Supporting Role	Being Julia	Nominated
2006	Screen Actors Guild	Outstanding Performance by a Cast in a Motion Picture	Capote	Nominated
2008	Gemini Awards	Best Performance by an Actor in a Leading Role in a Dramatic Program or Mini-Series	The Summit	Nominated
2009	Boston Society of Film Critics Awards	Best Cast	Star Trek	Won
2009	Denver Film Critics Society	Best Cast	Star Trek	Won
2009	Washington D.C. Area Film Critics Association	Best Ensemble	Star Trek	Nominated
2010	Gemini Awards	Best Actor in a Dramatic Program or Mini-Series	The Summit	Nominated
2011	Village Voice Film Poll	Best Supporting Actor	Meek's Cutoff	Nominated
2015	Naperville Independent Film Festival	Best Actor	WildLike	Won
2015	Los Angeles Independent Film Festival	Best Actor	WildLike	Won
2015	Twister Alley International Film Festival	Best Actor – Feature Film	WildLike	Won
2015	Vancouver Film Critics Circle	Best Supporting Actor in a Canadian Film	Elephant Song	Nominated
2015	Canadian Screen Awards	Best Performance by an Actor in a Leading Role	Elephant Song	Nominated
2016	Screen Actors Guild	Outstanding Performance by an Ensemble in a Drama Series	Mad Men	Nominated
2024	Astra TV Awards	Best Actor in a Limited Series or Television Movie	The Fall of the House of Usher	Nominated
2024	Critics' Choice Super Awards	Best Actor in a Horror Series, Limited Series or Made-for-TV Movie	The Fall of the House of Usher	Nominated
