= The Harvest (2013 film) =

- Directed by: John McNaughton
- Written by: Stephen Lancellotti
- Starring: Samantha Morton; Michael Shannon; Natasha Calis
- Cinematography: Rachel Morrison
- Edited by: Bill Pankow
- Music by: George S. Clinton
- Production company: Das Films; Elephant Eye Films; Living Out Loud Films
- Release dates: October 19, 2013 (Chicago International Film Festival); April 10, 2015
- Running time: 104 minutes
- Country: United States
- Language: English

The Harvest (released as Can't Come Out to Play in Europe) is a 2013 American horror thriller film released by IFC Films that was directed by John McNaughton. It was the first feature film he directed in over a decade (since Speaking of Sex in 2001) and his first horror project since Haeckel's Tale, a 2006 episode of the anthology series Masters of Horror. The movie had its world premiere on October 19, 2013, at the Chicago International Film Festival, and follows a young girl (Natasha Calis) who befriends a seemingly lonely and confined boy her own age, only to fall afoul of his mother.

In a 2017 interview, McNaughton said that the film "has the bones of a fairy tale. It’s about growing up and having to break free from your parents. Your parents want your heart and you can’t let them take it. You have to break away and make your own life."

== Plot ==
Reeling from the loss of her parents, teenager Maryann (Natasha Calis) moves in with her grandparents, and is grateful when she manages to befriend Andy (Charlie Tahan), a boy who uses a wheelchair. As Andy is very sick he must stay in his home per the instructions of his mother, Katherine (Samantha Morton), who also forbids him from having any visitors. When their visits are discovered, Andy's father, Richard (Michael Shannon), is initially fine with the visits, but Katherine is having none of it and her behavior grows increasingly erratic.

After Katherine meets up with Maryann's grandparents, and reveals to them that Andy is dying, they prohibit her from visiting Andy again. However, Maryann's visits continue in Katherine's absence; she even takes Andy outside to play baseball. Their time together is cut short when Katherine calls her son to inform him she is on her way home. They manage to get back inside the house and Maryann hides in the basement, where she discovers a comatose boy.

After Katherine discovers that Maryann visited her son, she verbally and physically assaults him. Richard comforts Andy, while Katherine takes care of Jason, the comatose boy. When Richard goes to get medical supplies, it is revealed he is having an affair with a woman called Sandra (Meadow Williams). Katherine's behavior grows even more volatile, while Maryann discovers that Jason was abducted from the hospital as a baby. She sneaks back to Andy's house and discovers that a liver transplant will take place. Katherine and Richard operate on Andy, removing part of his liver. Richard later tells Andy that he had to have emergency surgery to remove his appendix.

Meanwhile, Maryann returns to the house and informs Andy about the boy in the basement, and her suspicions that he was kidnapped. Andy, still skeptical, sneaks down to the basement and sees Jason. Richard spots him and tries to get him out before Katherine wakes up, but is unsuccessful. Andy pulls out the cords to Jason's machines, and Richard frantically tries to plug them in again. As Richard carries Andy out, Katherine divulges that Jason is her son.

Maryann returns to the house again and Andy reveals to her that he is the real Jason, and that Jason is the real Andy. It is disclosed that the heart transplant, that is about to take place, is for the real Andy, Katherine and Richard's biological son. The pair had abducted the real Jason as a baby, so they could harvest his organs, and save their ill son. Maryann tries to help him escape, while Richard goes to retrieve him for surgery. Feeling remorseful for his actions, Richard helps him escape with Maryann. A frantic Katherine, refusing to accept that there is no hope for her son, subdues Richard with a sedative and pursues the children. A dazed Richard heads down to the basement, and, after unplugging his son's ventilator, sets the basement on fire and lies next to his son. Katherine, who had caught up to Jason and Maryann, is informed via her pager that her son's ventilator has been unplugged, and runs back to the house. She desperately tries to get her deceased son out of the burning house, but is unsuccessful when the roof collapses on them.

In the end, Maryann and Jason, who has regained the use of his legs, are seen playing baseball.

== Cast ==
- Samantha Morton as Dr. Katherine Young
- Michael Shannon as Richard Young
- Natasha Calis as Maryann
- Charlie Tahan as Andy Young
- Peter Fonda as Grandfather
- Leslie Lyles as Grandmother
- Meadow Williams as Sandra

== Release ==
The film premiered on October 19, 2013, as part of the Chicago International Film Festival and was screened on July 21, 2014, in Canada as part of the Fantasia International Film Festival. In a 2017 interview, director John MacNaughton explained that The Harvest was completely independently financed, which was why there was no distribution plan:

''It’s the most independent film I’ve ever made. There was just one guy, a wonderful man named Gerry Kessler who died since the movie was completed, who wrote one check out of his own pocket, for $6.5 million dollars. The State of New York put up about $3 million in subsidies. There was no company. But when it was done, there was no one to distribute it. We had to go out and try to sell it. (...) I learned about distribution because I had to. One of the things I did was to call Robert Fischer, who befriended me years ago and who brought me to the Munich International Film Festival, and he booked the picture into Munich and after that it went to all these places, like Neuchâtel, Fantasia, FrightFest in the UK and a big festival in Finland. I went out there with no PR firm, just me trying to promote the film. I sure got sick of airplanes, but I loved being at those festivals."

The film was eventually bought by IFC Films, which gave it a simultaneous limited screening at the IFC Center and video on demand release on April 10, 2015.

== Reception ==
Critical reception for The Harvest has been mostly positive. IndieWire and Variety both gave favorable reviews for the film, and Bloody Disgusting heralded it as "a triumphant return for one of indie cinema’s edgiest directors."

John McNaughton sought a PG rating for the film, but failed: "I made a promise that I would deliver a movie with no overt violence, no bad language, no sex, no nudity. But the concept was so dark that (...) they wouldn’t give us the PG rating I wanted. Nothing you can really point to except, as with Henry, the overall moral tone."

On the review aggregator website Rotten Tomatoes, 68% of 22 critics' reviews are positive. The website's consensus reads: "The Harvest sows enough well-acted, slow-burning tension to satisfy, even if viewers expecting to reap all-out horror may come away wanting more." On Metacritic, the film has a weighted average score of 68 out of 100 based on 8 critics, which the site labels as "generally favorable" reviews.
