= Florentine Lahme =

German actress

- Born: 21 July 1974 (age 51); West Berlin, West Germany

Florentine Lahme (born 21 July 1974) is a German actress.

== Biography ==
Lahme was born in West Berlin, West Germany.

After she passed her Abitur (final exam to graduate from high school), Lahme studied Japanology and English for four semesters. After that, she decided to become an actress.

One of Lahme's first notable roles was as "Karen Stember", a student nurse in the German TV show Geliebte Schwestern (Beloved Sisters), which she played for 250 episodes. She has also had numerous appearances in other German shows and feature films. She also appeared as Nadia Schilling in the TV series Defying Gravity.
